= Raegan Beers =

American basketball player (born 2003)

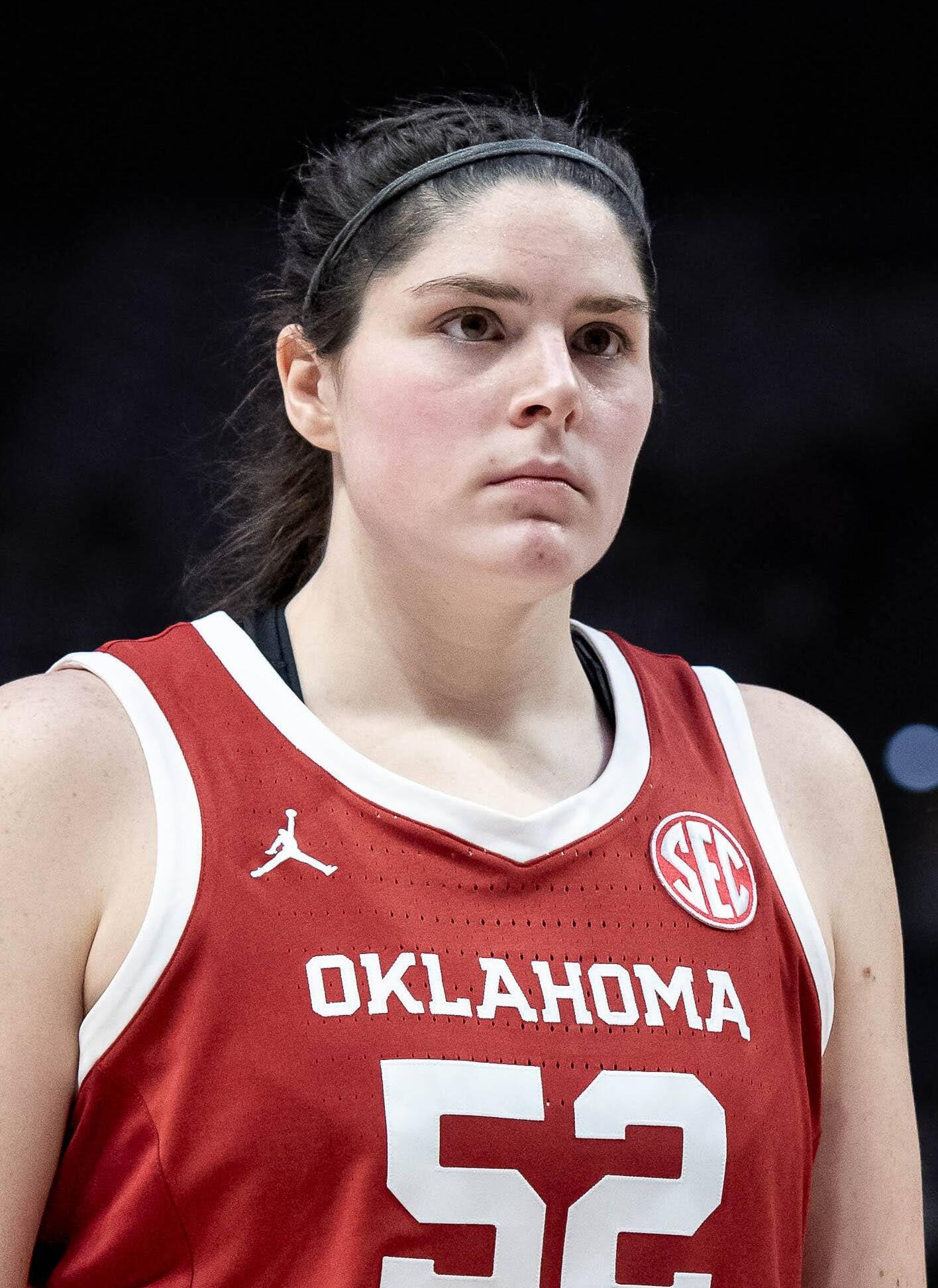
- Beers with Oklahoma in 2025

No. 15 – Houston Comets
- Position: Forward
- League: WNBA

Personal information
- Born: July 23, 2003 (age 23) Littleton, Colorado, U.S.
- Listed height: 6 ft 4 in (1.93 m)
- Listed weight: 244 lb (111 kg)

Career information
- High school: Valor Christian (Highlands Ranch, Colorado)
- College: Oregon State (2022–2024); Oklahoma (2024–2026)
- WNBA draft: 2026: undrafted
- Playing career: 2026–present

Career history
- 2026: Connecticut Sun
- 2026–present: Nesibe Aydın
- 2027–present: Houston Comets

Career highlights
- Third-team All-American – AP (2024); Third-team All-American – USBWA (2026); 4× Lisa Leslie Award Finalist; 2× First-team All-SEC (2025, 2026); 2× All-Pac-12 Team – Coaches (2023, 2024); All-Pac-12 Team – Media (2024); Pac-12 Freshman of the Year (2023); Pac-12 Sixth Player of the Year (2023); Pac-12 All-Freshman Team (2023); McDonald's All-American (2022)
- Stats at WNBA.com
- Stats at Basketball Reference
Medals
Women's basketball
Representing the United States
FIBA AmeriCup
Gold medal – first place	2025 Chile

Raegan Beers (born July 23, 2003) is an American professional basketball player for the Houston Comets of the Women's National Basketball Association (WNBA), and for Nesibe Aydın GSK of the Turkish Super League. She played college basketball for the Oklahoma Sooners and Oregon State Beavers.

== High school career ==
Beers played basketball for Valor Christian High School in Highlands Ranch, Colorado. She missed her junior season with a torn ACL, as her team won the Class 5A state title in her absence. As a senior, she helped Valor Christian return to the Class 5A state title game and was named a McDonald's All-American. Rated a five-star recruit by ESPN, Beers committed to play college basketball for Oregon State.

== College career ==
As a freshman at Oregon State, Beers averaged 13.3 points and 8.6 rebounds per game, earning All-Pac-12 honors from the league's coaches and being named Pac-12 Freshman of the Year and Sixth Player of the Year. In her sophomore season, she was selected to the All-Pac-12 Team. She helped lead Oregon State to its first Elite Eight since 2018, where they ultimately lost to South Carolina.

Beers entered the transfer portal at the end of the 2023–24 season, and committed to Oklahoma on April 29, 2024.

As a junior, Beers averaged 17.3 points, 9.4 rebounds, 1.1 assists, and 1.2 blocks per game while shooting 63.3% from the field. She became the first Division I women's player in at least 25 years to average at least 17.0 points and 9.0 rebounds while shooting 63% or better from the field in under 25 minutes per game. She led the Southeastern Conference in player efficiency rating (35.9) and recorded 15 double-doubles, the most by an Oklahoma player since 2010. Beers scored 20 or more points in 13 games, including back-to-back 30-point performances against Vanderbilt and Arkansas. She was named the USBWA National Player of the Week following the two performances. Beers was named to the All-SEC First Team and earned Honorable Mention All-American honors from the Associated Press, USBWA, and WBCA. She was also a finalist for the Lisa Leslie Award. She was also a first-team Academic All-American, with a 3.51 GPA in multidisciplinary studies. In the NCAA Tournament, Beers had a season-high 18 rebounds against FGCU in the first round, finishing with 25 points and 18 rebounds. She recorded 11 points and 13 rebounds against Iowa in the second round before recording 10 points and 10 rebounds in a Sweet Sixteen loss to UConn.

As a senior, Beers started all 34 games and averaged 15.8 points, 10.4 rebounds, 2.2 assists, and 1.0 block per game while shooting 61.5% from the field. She was the only Power Five player to average at least 15.8 points, 10.4 rebounds, and 2.2 assists per game. She recorded 22 double-doubles, the third-most in the NCAA, becoming just the second Oklahoma player to record at least 20 double-doubles in a season. Her 67 career double-doubles ranked among the top 25 in NCAA history. She recorded two separate streaks of six consecutive double-doubles, tied for the second-longest streak in Oklahoma history. Beers became the third Oklahoma player to reach 2,000 career points and 1,200 career rebounds, scoring her 2,000th career point against Florida on March 5. She led the SEC in field goal percentage, ranked second in rebounding, first in double-doubles, and 14th in scoring. She scored in double figures 29 times, including nine 20-point performances, and recorded at least 10 rebounds in 23 games. Beers was named to the All-SEC First Team and earned Third-Team All-American honors from the USBWA and Honorable Mention All-American honors from the AP and WBCA. She was also a finalist for the Lisa Leslie Award and Wooden Award, and was named a First-Team Academic All-American.

== Professional career ==
On April 15, 2026, Beers signed a training camp contract with the Connecticut Sun after going unselected in the 2026 WNBA draft.

== Career statistics ==
Legend
GP	Games played	GS	Games started	MPG	Minutes per game	FG%	Field goal percentage
3P%	3-point field goal percentage	FT%	Free throw percentage	RPG	Rebounds per game	APG	Assists per game
SPG	Steals per game	BPG	Blocks per game	TO	Turnovers per game	PPG	Points per game
**Bold**	Career high	*	Led Division I

=== College ===
Raegan Beers NCAA Statistics
Year	Team	GP	GS	MPG	FG%	3P%	FT%	RPG	APG	SPG	BPG	TO	PPG
2022–23	Oregon State	31	6	24.4	.560	.125	**.729**	8.6	1.0	0.7	0.7	**2.2**	13.3
2023–24	Oregon State	31	31	**28.0**	**.664**°	.000	.627	**10.3**	**1.6**	**1.2**	**1.3**	2.4	**17.5**
2024–25	Oklahoma	**33**	**33**	22.4	.633	**.364**	.698	9.4	1.1	0.6	1.2	2.8	17.3
**Career**		95	70	24.9	.624	.302	.685	9.4	1.2	0.8	1.1	2.4	16.0

== National team career ==
Beers played in the 2025 FIBA Women's AmeriCup and won a gold medal, averaging 8.1 points with a team-high 5.7 rebounds.

== Personal life ==
Beers is a Christian. Beers' father, Ike, is a police sergeant for the city of Lakewood, Colorado. Her older brother, Rocky, has played college football for Air Force and FIU, and her younger brother, Rowdy, also plays football for FIU. Her sister, Rylie, plays basketball for Belmont; the two played each other in Oklahoma's season opener in 2025.
