= Lauren Betts =

American basketball player (born 2003)

- Betts with Fenerbahçe in 2026

No. 51 – Washington Mystics
- Position: Center
- League: WNBA

Personal information
- Born: October 15, 2003 (age 23) Vitoria-Gasteiz, Spain
- Listed height: 6 ft 7 in (2.01 m)
- Listed weight: 231 lb (105 kg)

Career information
- High school: Grandview (Aurora, Colorado)
- College: Stanford (2022–2023); UCLA (2023–2026)
- WNBA draft: 2026: 1st round, 4th overall pick
- Drafted by: Washington Mystics
- Playing career: 2026–present

Career history
- 2026–present: Washington Mystics
- 2026–present: Fenerbahçe

Career highlights
- NCAA champion (2026); FIBA Europe SuperCup Women champion (2026); NCAA Tournament MOP (2026); 2× First-team All-American – USBWA, AP (2025, 2026); 2× WBCA Coaches' All-American (2025, 2026); Honda-Broderick Cup (2026); Honda Sports Award (2026); Naismith Defensive Player of the Year (2025); WBCA Defensive Player of the Year (2025); 2× Lisa Leslie Award (2025, 2026); Big Ten Female Athlete of the Year (2026); Big Ten Player of the Year (2026); 2× Big Ten Defensive Player of the Year (2025, 2026); 2× First-team All-Big Ten (2025, 2026); 2× Big Ten All-Defensive Team (2025, 2026); Big Ten tournament MOP (2025); All-Pac-12 Team (2024); Pac-12 All-Defensive Team (2024); McDonald's All-American (2022)
- Stats at Basketball Reference
Medals
Women's basketball
Representing the United States
FIBA AmeriCup
Silver medal – second place	2023 Mexico	Team
FIBA Under-19 World Cup
Gold medal – first place	2021 Hungary	Team
FIBA Americas Under-16 Championship
Gold medal – first place	2019 Chile	Team

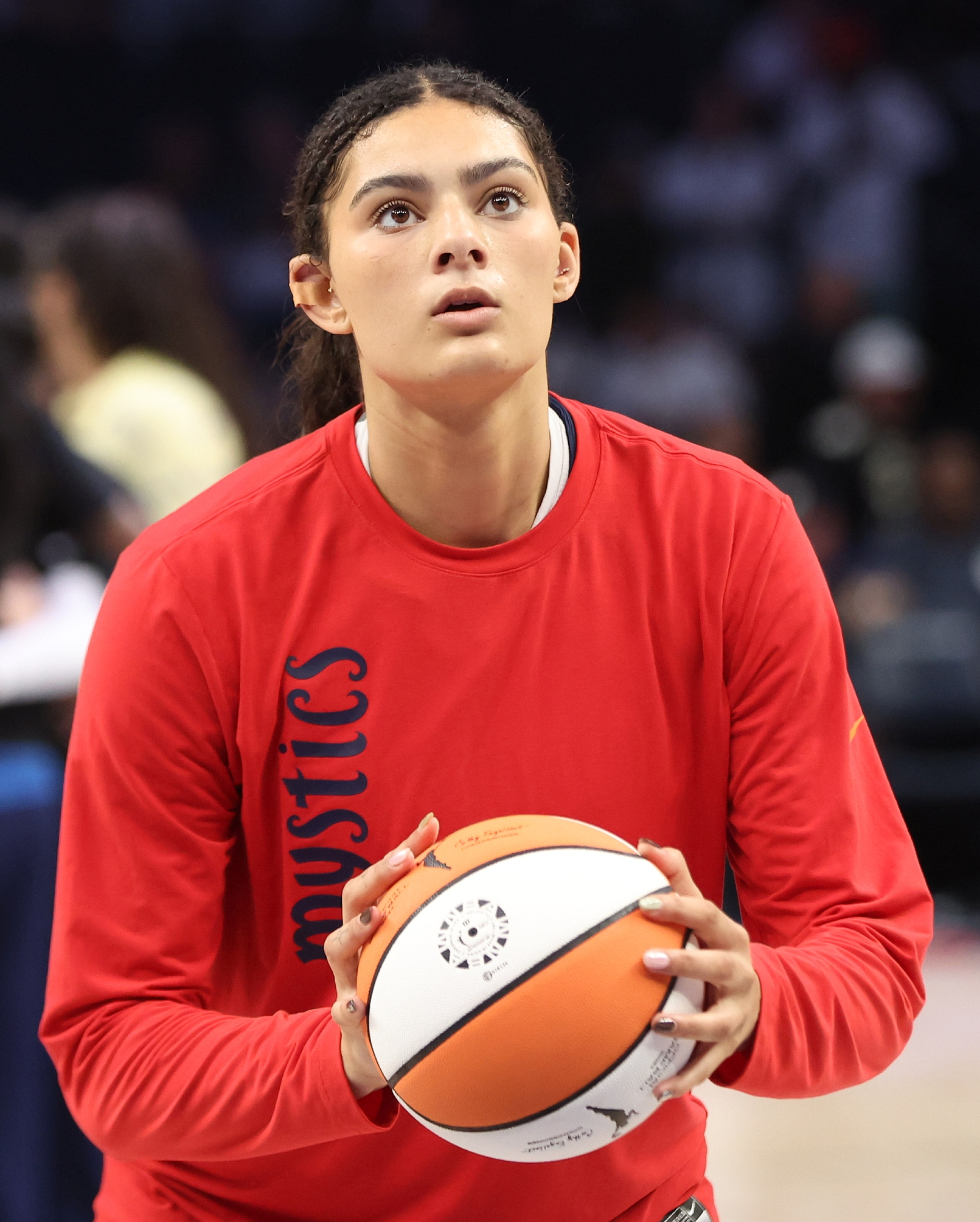
Betts with the Washington Mystics in 2026

Lauren Marie Betts (born October 15, 2003) is an American professional basketball player for the Washington Mystics of the Women's National Basketball Association (WNBA) and Fenerbahçe of the Turkish Super League. She played for Grandview High School in Aurora, Colorado, where she was ranked as the number one recruit in her class by ESPN. Betts started her college career with the Stanford Cardinal before transferring to UCLA after one season. She has twice been named a first-team All-American with the Bruins. She led 2025-26 UCLA team to the championship of the 2026 NCAA tournament, where she was named the NCAA tournament Most Outstanding Player (MOP).

== Early life and high school career ==
Betts was born in Vitoria-Gasteiz, Spain, and moved around the country during her childhood due to the basketball career of her father, Andrew. When she was in third grade, her family settled in the United States. Before focusing on basketball, Betts was involved in dance, swimming and soccer. By sixth grade, she was six feet tall. She played for Grandview High School in Aurora, Colorado. As a freshman, Betts averaged 12.7 points, 8.6 rebounds and 3.9 blocks per game for the Class 5A runners-up. In her sophomore season, she averaged 17.8 points, 11.2 rebounds and 3.9 blocks per game, leading her team back to the state title game, which was canceled due to the COVID-19 pandemic. Betts averaged 17.5 points and 11 rebounds per game as a junior, helping Grandview achieve a 17–1 record and reach the Class 5A semifinals. She was named Colorado Gatorade Player of the Year. Betts led her team to the Class 5A state championship in her senior season. She averaged 17.2 points, 11 rebounds and 3.6 blocks per game, winning Women's Basketball Coaches Association High School Player of the Year and repeating as Colorado Gatorade Player of the Year. She also played in both the McDonald's All-American Game and Jordan Brand Classic.

=== Recruiting ===
Betts was considered a five-star recruit and the number one player in the 2022 class by ESPN. On January 13, 2021, she committed to playing college basketball for Stanford over offers from Notre Dame, Oregon, UCLA, UConn, and South Carolina.

== College career ==
=== 2022–23: Freshman season ===
Betts came off the bench for Stanford in her freshman season. On November 9, 2022, she recorded a season-high 18 points, six rebounds, and three blocks in a 104–40 win over Cal State Northridge. As a freshman, she averaged 5.9 points and 3.5 rebounds in 9.7 minutes per game, earning Pac-12 All-Freshman honorable mention.

=== 2023–24: Sophomore season ===
For her sophomore season, Betts transferred to UCLA. She immediately assumed a greater role with the Bruins as the team's starting center. In January 2024, Betts missed four games due to a medical issue, which was later disclosed as time to focus on her mental health. On February 16, she scored a season-high 24 points in a 79–77 loss to AP No. 11 Oregon State. Betts finished the season averaging 14.9 points, 9.3 rebounds, and 2 blocks per game. She was an All-Pac-12 Team and a Pac-12 All-Defensive Team selection, while earning All-America honorable mention from the AP and the U.S. Basketball Writers Association (USBWA).

=== 2024–25: Junior season ===
In the second game of her junior season, on November 10, 2024, Betts had 31 points and nine rebounds in an 81–63 win over Colgate. On January 20, 2025, she tallied 24 points, nine rebounds, and a program-record nine blocks in a 72–57 win against AP No. 25 Baylor. On January 26, 2025, Betts posted a career-high 33 points, seven rebounds, and four blocks in an 82–67 victory over AP No. 8 Maryland. During the game, she shot 14-of-15 from the field (93.3 percent), breaking the program single-game record in field goal percentage with at least 15 attempts. On February 20, Betts surpassed Monique Billings to set the UCLA single-season record in blocks, as part of a 22-point, 6-block effort in a 70–55 win over AP No. 25 Illinois.

The Bruins had a strong season and were ranked number one in the nation after defeating defending champion South Carolina during the regular season. Betts led the Bruins to their First Big Ten Tournament Championship and First 30 wins in a season. Betts was named to the Big Ten All-Tournament team and was the most outstanding player of the tournament. Betts was named as both an AP and a USBWA First Team All–American. She was named one of four finalists for the Naismith Women's Player of the Year, and was named the 2025 Naismith Women’s College Defensive Player of the Year. She was named to the John R. Wooden Award Women’s All-America team. She received the Lisa Leslie Award, which honors the top college center. When the Bruins defeated Richmond to advance to the Sweet Sixteen, coach Cori Close stated, "She's an absolute generational player." Betts helped the Bruins reach the 2025 Final Four, and was named to the NCAA WBB Final Four all-tournament team.

=== 2025–26: Senior season ===
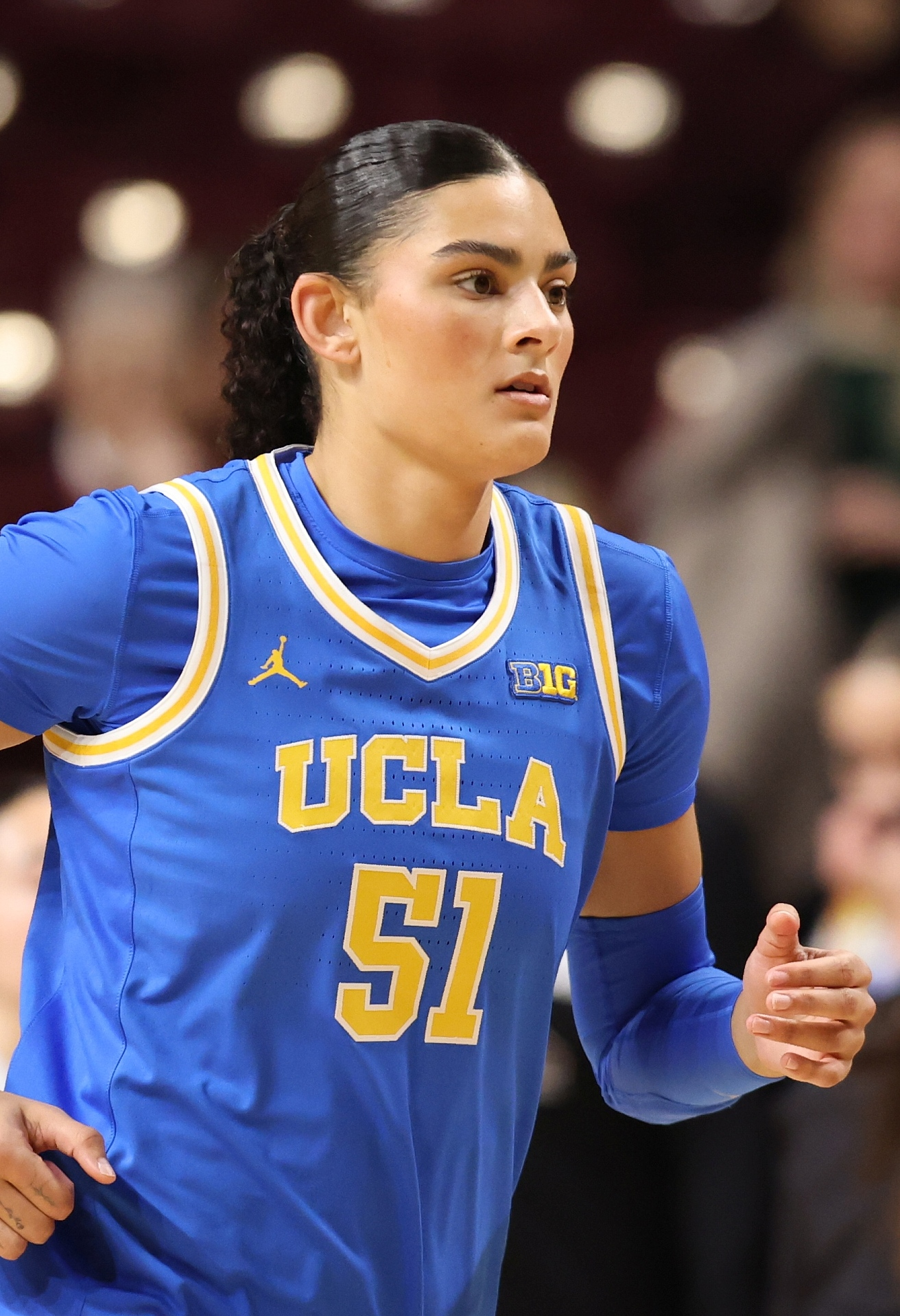
Betts in 2026

During her 2025–26 senior season, Betts led UCLA to both the Big Ten regular season and Big Ten tournament titles. Betts was also named the Big Ten Player of the Year (POY), while repeating as the conference's Defensive Player of the Year (DPOY). During the 2026 NCAA Tournament, and in her last home game at Pauley Pavilion, Betts scored a career high 35 points against Oklahoma State, which contributed to UCLA advancing to the Sweet 16. On March 19, 2026 Betts published her ground breaking article, I Want To Be Here, about her mental health journey in The Players Tribune which garnered national attention. During the Final Four, Betts delivered double-doubles in both points and rebounds against fellow No.1 seeds Texas and South Carolina. The Bruins won the 2026 national championship, which was its first NCAA women's basketball championship, and second national championship, and Betts was named the NCAA tournament Most Outstanding Player (MOP). Overall, Betts became the first player, male or female, to set an NCAA tournament record with 125+ points on 65 percent or better shooting, 50+ rebounds, and 15+ blocks. Betts finished her career as only the third player in UCLA women's basketball history, with 1800+ points and 1000+ rebounds, joining Bruin legends Denise Curry and Natalie Williams. Betts also finished her career as UCLA's all-time leading shot blocker, with 235 shots blocked while playing for UCLA and 264 career blocked shots. As of the end of the 2026 season, Her single season (100) and single game blocked shots also are UCLA records. She is the UCLA record holder for field goal percentage in a game (.938 15-16), season (.648) and career (.621). On April 8, 2026 Betts earned her record 15th Student-Athlete of the Week award from UCLA. Betts also earned her second Lisa Leslie Award, and on April 28, 2026, Betts was named the Honda Sport Award winner for basketball. On July 8, 2026, Betts was named the Big Ten Female Athlete of the Year. On July 15, 2026, Betts won the Best Female College Athlete ESPY Award at the 2026 ESPY Awards. She is the first Bruin to ever receive the award. Lauren Betts was awarded the Honda-Broderick Cup on July 27, 2026.

== Professional career ==
On April 13, 2026, the Washington Mystics selected Betts as the fourth overall pick of the 2026 WNBA draft.

On September 10, 2026, Betts joined the Turkish powerhouse Fenerbahçe.

== National team career ==
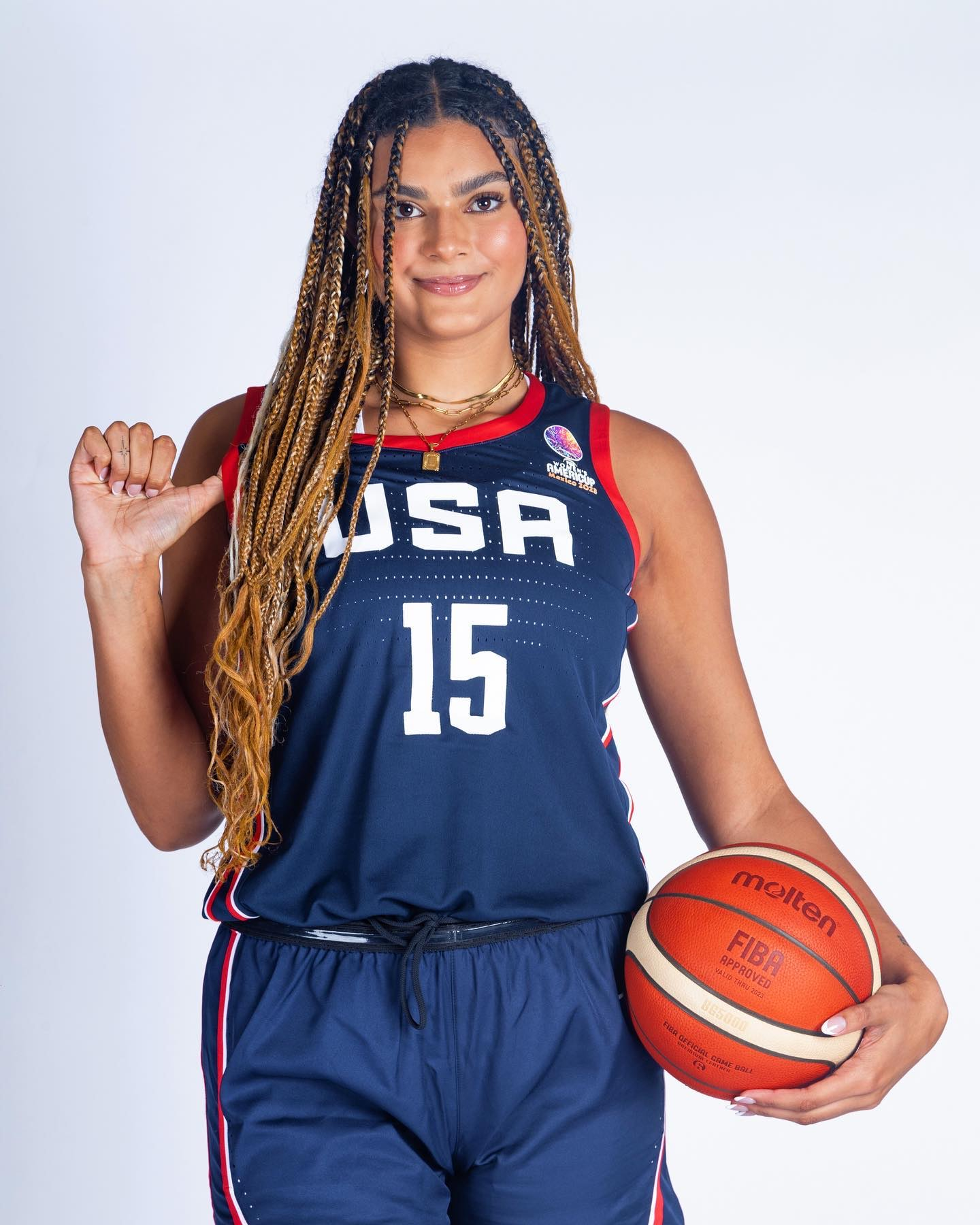
Betts with the 2023 U.S. FIBA AmeriCup team

Betts won a gold medal with the United States under-16 national team at the 2019 FIBA Under-16 Americas Championship in Chile. She averaged 12.2 points, 13.5 rebounds and 2.5 blocks per game, earning all-tournament honors. Betts was the youngest member of the under-19 national team at the 2021 FIBA Under-19 World Cup in Hungary. She averaged 11.1 points, 9.6 rebounds and 1.9 blocks per game en route to a gold medal. Betts played for the senior national team at the 2023 FIBA AmeriCup in Mexico, helping her team win a silver medal. She averaged 11.4 points, 10.9 rebounds and 2.1 blocks per game.

== Personal life ==
Betts was born to Andrew and Michelle Betts. Andrew was a center for the Great Britain and England national teams who played for several leading European clubs and was drafted by the NBA's Charlotte Hornets. Her mother, Michelle, played volleyball for Long Beach State, winning a national title in 1993. She has a sister, Sienna, who plays basketball at UCLA, and two brothers, Dylan and Ashton. In 2025, Betts appeared in the 10th season of RuPaul's Drag Race All Stars as a guest who received a makeover as part of a weekly challenge. Lauren played on a state champion team with sister Sienna in High School and an NCAA champion team with Sienna in college.

=== Business interests ===
On July 21, 2025, Betts and her sister, Sienna, were signed by Unrivaled, a 3x3 basketball league, to NIL deals as part of "The Future is Unrivaled Class of 2025". In addition, in April 2026, Betts signed a shoe deal with Reebok.

== Career statistics ==
Legend
GP	Games played	GS	Games started	MPG	Minutes per game	RPG	Rebounds per game
APG	Assists per game	SPG	Steals per game	BPG	Blocks per game	PPG	Points per game
TO	Turnovers per game	FG%	Field-goal percentage	3P%	3-point field-goal percentage	FT%	Free-throw percentage
**Bold**	Career best	°	League leader

=== College ===
Year	Team	GP	GS	MPG	FG%	3P%	FT%	RPG	APG	SPG	BPG	TO	PPG
2022–23	Stanford	33	0	9.6	60.2	–	56.7	3.5	0.5	0.2	0.9	**0.5**	5.9
2023–24	UCLA	29	27	27.2	64.3	–	61.0	9.3	1.0	0.4	2.0	2.1	14.9
2024–25	UCLA	34	34	**30.1**	**64.8**	–	62.0	**9.5**	2.7	0.9	**2.9**	2.7	**20.2**
2025–26	UCLA	**37**	**37**	27.7	58.2	0.0	**68.6**	8.8	**3.2**	**1.0**	2.1	2.2	17.1
**Career**		133	98	23.7	61.9	0.0	62.0	7.8	1.9	0.7	2.0	1.9	14.6
Statistics retrieved from Sports-Reference
