= Kiki Rice =

American basketball player (born 2004)

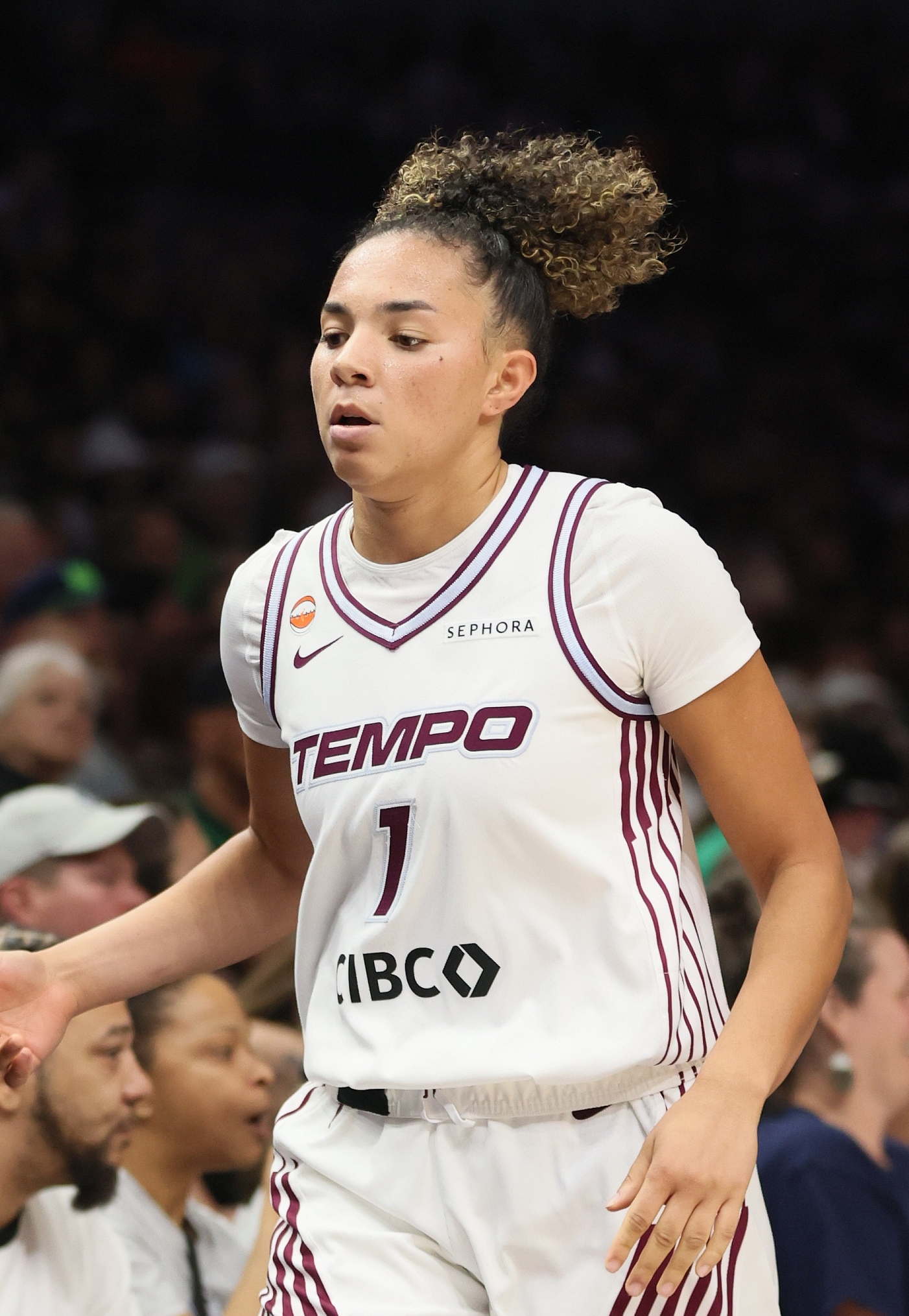
- Rice with the Toronto Tempo in 2026

No. 1 – Toronto Tempo
- Position: Point guard
- League: WNBA

Personal information
- Born: January 14, 2004 (age 22) San Francisco, California, U.S.
- Listed height: 5 ft 11 in (1.80 m)
- Listed weight: 166 lb (75 kg)

Career information
- High school: Sidwell Friends School (Washington, D.C.)
- College: UCLA (2022–2026)
- WNBA draft: 2026: 1st round, 6th overall pick
- Drafted by: Toronto Tempo
- Playing career: 2026–present

Career history
- 2026–present: Toronto Tempo
- 2027–present: Mist BC

Career highlights
- WNBA All-Rookie Team (2026); NCAA champion (2026); Third-team All-American – AP, USBWA (2026); 2× First-team All-Big Ten (2025, 2026); Big Ten tournament MOP (2026); All-Pac-12 Team (2024); Pac-12 All-Freshman Team (2023); Elite 90 Award (2025); Gatorade National Player of the Year (2022); Morgan Wootten National Player of the Year (2022); Naismith Prep Player of the Year (2022); McDonald's All-American Game co-MVP (2022); FIBA Under-18 Americas Championship MVP (2022)
- Stats at Basketball Reference
Medals
Women's basketball
Representing the United States
FIBA Under-19 World Cup
Gold medal – first place	2023 Spain	Team
FIBA Under-18 Americas Championship
Gold medal – first place	2022 Argentina	Team
FIBA Under-16 Americas Championship
Gold medal – first place	2019 Chile	Team
Women's 3x3 basketball
Representing the United States
FIBA 3x3 Under-18 World Cup
Gold medal – first place	2021 Hungary	Team

Kira Carroll "Kiki" Rice (born January 14, 2004) is an American professional basketball player for the Toronto Tempo of the Women's National Basketball Association (WNBA) and for the Mist of Unrivaled. She attended Sidwell Friends School, where she was one of the top high school recruits in her class and earned national high school player of the year honors as a senior. Rice played college basketball for the UCLA Bruins and helped the Bruins win the national championship while earning third-team All-American honors in 2026. She was selected sixth overall by the Toronto Tempo in the 2026 WNBA draft, becoming the first-ever draft pick in franchise history.

== High school career ==
Rice played basketball for Sidwell Friends School in Washington, D.C. As a freshman, she averaged 19.2 points, 9.4 rebounds and 6.6 assists per game, leading her team to the semifinals of the state tournament. In her sophomore season, Rice averaged 26.8 points, 10.7 rebounds, 4.7 assists and 2.3 steals per game, helping her team reach the District of Columbia State Athletic Association (DCSAA) Class AA title game. She was named D.C. Gatorade Player of the Year and DMV Student-Athlete of the Year by NBC Sports Washington. Rice did not play in her junior year after the Independent School League (ISL) canceled winter sports activities amid the COVID-19 pandemic. In her senior season, she led Sidwell Friends to a 28–0 record and the No. 1 national ranking by ESPN and MaxPreps, averaging 15.8 points, seven rebounds, 5.1 assists, and 2.6 steals per game. Her team won the ISL tournament and its first DCSAA Class AA title. Rice earned Gatorade Athlete of the Year, Gatorade National Player of the Year, Morgan Wootten National Player of the Year and Naismith Prep Player of the Year honors. She played in the McDonald's All-American Game, where she shared the MVP award with Gabriela Jaquez.

In addition to basketball, Rice played soccer for Sidwell Friends School at the forward and midfielder positions. In her freshman season, she led the team to ISL and DCSAA tournament titles. Rice was named D.C. Gatorade Player of the Year and DCSAA Player of the Year after recording 42 goals and 12 assists. As a senior, Rice repeated as D.C. Gatorade Player of the Year, helping Sidwell Friends win the DCSAA tournament, and recorded 15 goals and nine assists. She was named MaxPreps Athlete of the Year for her performance in basketball and soccer.

=== Recruiting ===
Rice was considered a five-star recruit, the second-best player and the top point guard in the 2022 class by ESPN. On November 4, 2021, she committed to playing college basketball for UCLA over offers from UConn, Stanford, Arizona, and Duke. Rice became the highest-ranked recruit in program history. She was drawn to UCLA by the opportunity to help lead a team to its first Final Four and national championship.

== College career ==
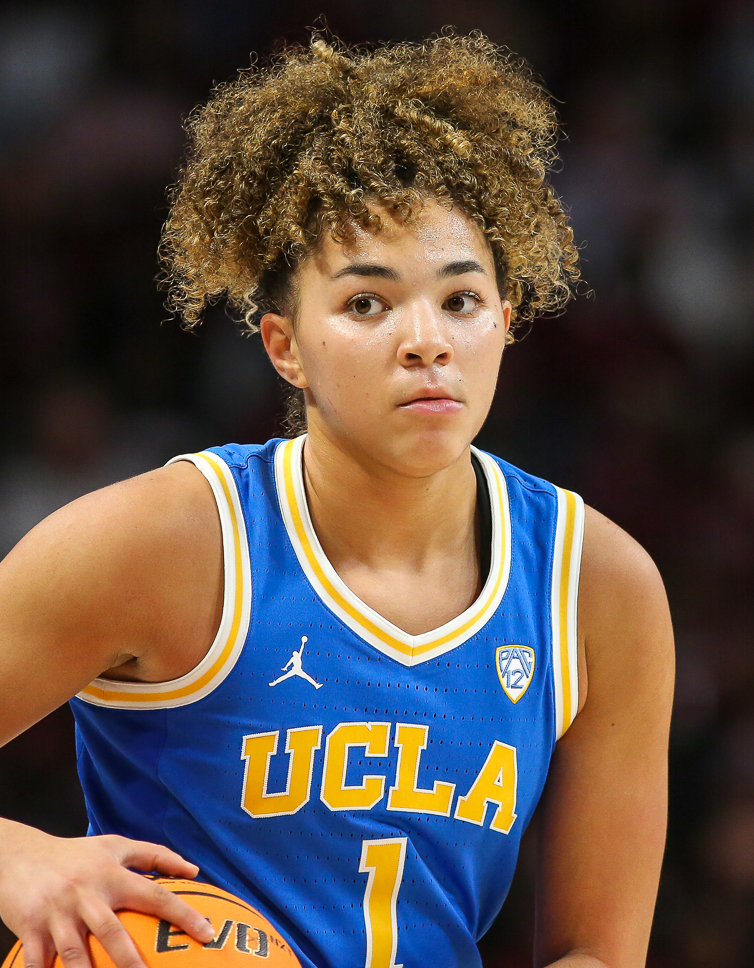
Rice with UCLA in 2022

In October 2022, Kiki became the first college athlete to sign a NIL deal with the Jordan brand.

On November 7, 2022, Rice made her debut for UCLA, recording 12 points and seven assists in an 84–48 win over Cal Poly. On March 3, 2023, she scored a season-high 22 points in a 69–65 upset win over Stanford at the Pac-12 tournament semifinals. As a freshman, Rice averaged 11.6 points, 4.5 rebounds and 3 assists per game, making the Pac-12 All-Freshman Team. On November 24, she recorded 24 points, 11 rebounds and eight assists in a 78–67 win over AP No. 6 UConn at the Cayman Islands Classic. Rice posted her first triple-double on December 7, with 14 points, 10 rebounds, 10 assists and seven steals in a 111–48 victory over Cal State Northridge.

As a senior in 2025–26, Rice was second on the team in points, rebounds, assists, and steals, and she was named a third-team All-American. Rice helped lead UCLA to their first women’s basketball national championship in the NCAA era.

== Professional career ==
On April 13, 2026, the Toronto Tempo selected Rice as the sixth overall pick of the 2026 WNBA draft, becoming the first pick in franchise history.

Rice averaged 13.4 points, 3.7 rebounds, 3.5 assists in her rookie season. She missed 16 games due to a grade 3 ankle sprain. She had a career-high 28 points against the Connecticut Sun on September 24, 2026. Rice was named to the 2026 WNBA All-rookie Team on October 14, 2026.

== National team career ==
Rice helped the United States under-16 national team win a gold medal at the 2019 FIBA Under-16 Americas Championship in Chile, where she averaged 7.2 points, 4.7 rebounds and 3.7 assists per game. She led the United States under-18 national team to a gold medal at the 2022 FIBA Under-18 Americas Championship in Argentina. Rice earned tournament MVP honors after averaging 14.3 points, four rebounds and four assists per game. At the 2023 FIBA Under-19 World Cup in Spain, she averaged 10 points, 5 rebounds and 2.1 assists per game en route to a gold medal.

In 3x3 basketball, Rice won a gold medal with the United States at the FIBA 3x3 Under-18 World Cup in Hungary.

== Career statistics ==
Legend
GP	Games played	GS	Games started	MPG	Minutes per game	RPG	Rebounds per game
APG	Assists per game	SPG	Steals per game	BPG	Blocks per game	PPG	Points per game
TO	Turnovers per game	FG%	Field-goal percentage	3P%	3-point field-goal percentage	FT%	Free-throw percentage
**Bold**	Career best	°	League leader

=== WNBA ===
WNBA regular season statistics
Year	Team	GP	GS	MPG	FG%	3P%	FT%	RPG	APG	SPG	BPG	TO	PPG
2026	Toronto	28	20	27.1	.472	.351	.869	3.7	3.5	.8	.2	1.8	13.4
**Career**	1 year, 1 team	28	20	27.1	.472	.351	.869	3.7	3.5	.8	.2	1.8	13.4

=== College ===
Year	Team	GP	GS	MPG	FG%	3P%	FT%	RPG	APG	SPG	BPG	TO	PPG
2022–23	UCLA	37	36	28.1	.411	.217	.791	4.5	3.0	1.2	**.5**	**1.6**	11.6
2023–24	UCLA	34	34	**31.2**	.449	.312	.876°	5.7	4.5	1.4	**.5**	2.5	13.2
2024–25	UCLA	34	33	28.4	.485	.365	.871	3.5	**5.0**	1.4	.4	2.1	12.8
2025–26	UCLA	**38**	**37**	30.8	**.490**	**.385**	**.902**	**5.9**	4.3	**1.5**	.4	1.7	**14.9**
**Career**		143	140	29.6	.458	.328	.860	4.9	4.2	1.4	.4	2.0	13.1
Statistics retrieved from Sports-Reference.

== Off the court ==
=== Personal life ===
Rice's father, John, and brother, Teo, have both played college basketball for Yale. Her mother, Andrea, was a member of the tennis team at Yale. Rice's aunt is diplomat Susan Rice, and she is a cousin of former NBA player Allan Houston.

In June 2025, Rice revealed that she was dating NBA player Cason Wallace and that they met in a Junior NBA program when Rice was in the 8th grade.

=== Business interests ===
On October 31, 2022, Rice became the first athlete to sign a name, image and likeness deal with Jordan Brand.

On July 21, 2025, Rice was signed by Unrivaled, a 3x3 basketball league, to NIL deals as part of "The Future is Unrivaled Class of 2025".

=== In popular culture ===
In March 2024, ESPN+'s new original docuseries, Full Court Press premiered in May 2024. The series (from Peyton Manning’s Omaha Productions and Words & Pictures) followed Rice, South Carolina's Kamilla Cardoso, and Iowa's Caitlin Clark throughout their 2023–24 season and post-season.
