= 2024–25 UCLA Bruins women's basketball team =

Intercollegiate basketball season

2024–25 UCLA Bruins women's basketball

Big Ten tournament champions

NCAA tournament, Final Four
- Conference: Big Ten Conference

Ranking
- Coaches: No. 3
- AP: No. 3
- Record: 34–3 (16–2 Big Ten)
- Head coach: Cori Close (14th season)
- Associate head coach: Shannon Perry-LeBeauf
- Assistant coaches: Tasha Brown; Tony Newnan; Soh Matsuura; James Clark
- Home arena: Pauley Pavilion

2024–25 Big Ten women's basketball standings
	Conf.				Overall
Team	W		L	PCT	W		L	PCT
No. 5 USC	17	–	1	.944	31	–	4	.886
No. 3 UCLA †	16	–	2	.889	34	–	3	.919
No. 19 Ohio State	13	–	5	.722	26	–	7	.788
No. 12 Maryland	13	–	5	.722	25	–	8	.758
No. 25 Michigan	11	–	7	.611	23	–	11	.676
Michigan State	11	–	7	.611	22	–	10	.688
Illinois	11	–	7	.611	22	–	10	.688
Oregon	10	–	8	.556	20	–	12	.625
Indiana	10	–	8	.556	20	–	13	.606
Nebraska	10	–	8	.556	21	–	12	.636
Iowa	10	–	8	.556	23	–	11	.676
Washington	9	–	9	.500	19	–	14	.576
Minnesota	8	–	10	.444	25	–	11	.694
Wisconsin	4	–	14	.222	13	–	17	.433
Rutgers	3	–	15	.167	13	–	20	.394
Purdue	3	–	15	.167	10	–	19	.345
Northwestern	2	–	16	.111	9	–	18	.333
Penn State	1	–	17	.056	10	–	19	.345
† 2025 Big Ten tournament winner As of April 7, 2025; Rankings from AP poll

The 2024–25 UCLA Bruins women's basketball team represented the University of California, Los Angeles during the 2024–25 NCAA Division I women's basketball season. The Bruins were led by head coach Cori Close in her fourteenth year, and played their home games at Pauley Pavilion. This marked the program's first season as a member of the Big Ten Conference. In the preseason, the Bruins were picked to finish second in the expanded Big Ten behind rival USC. Lauren Betts and Kiki Rice were named to the preseason All-Big Ten conference team. In the pre-season AP poll UCLA was ranked fifth.

The Bruins were jumped No. 1 in the polls for the first time in program history after defeating the defending 2024 national champion South Carolina on November 24, 2024. The statement win over South Carolina broke the Gamecocks 43 game winning streak, the 7th longest women's Division I basketball streak at the time. The 2024–25 season was the first for UCLA and USC in the Big Ten Conference and a notable chapter in the history of the UCLA–USC rivalry. The Bruins were undefeated and ranked No. 1 in the polls for twelve weeks before the two teams met in 2025. On February 13, 2025, the No. 6 Trojans defeated the Bruins 71–60 for the Trojans' first victory against a No. 1 team at home. In the re-match at Pauley Pavilion on March 1, 2025, the Trojans and Bruins were tied for first place in the Big Ten in the final regular season game. In that game, No. 4 ranked USC Defeated No. 2 ranked UCLA 80–67 to win the regular season Big Ten championship. Both games drew national attention and media coverage, with many celebrities in attendance. The teams met a third time in the 2025 Big Ten women's basketball tournament championship game on March 9, 2025. The Bruins defeated the Trojans to win the Big Ten Tournament championship and received the conference's automatic bid to the 2025 NCAA Division I women's basketball tournament.

UCLA finished the regular season with a 27–2 record, 16–2 in conference and a second-place finish, with their only losses coming to USC. For the first time in school history, the UCLA Bruins were a number 1 seed and also the number 1 overall seed in the NCAA tournament. UCLA reached the Final Four of the NCAA Division I women's basketball tournament for the first time in program history. (Note: The UCLA Bruins women's basketball team has played in the semi-finals of the AIAW women's basketball tournament twice, winning the championship in 1978) Arriving at the Final Four, the UCLA women's basketball team traveled more than any other in the country during the season with 36,116 air miles. They lost to the eventual national champion UConn Huskies in a semi-final game. A documentary named You See LA produced by Fox Sports was broadcast on March 1, 2026 on FS1 immediately following the 2026 UCLA-USC women's basketball game. The episode includes footage from games and post-game locker room team meetings, team gatherings, and interviews.

== Previous season ==
The Bruins finished the 2023–24 season with a 27–7 record, including 13–5 in Pac-12 play to finish tied for second place with rival USC. They received an at-large bid to the 2024 NCAA Tournament, and were eliminated in the sweet sixteen by LSU. Ranked as high as number 2 during the season, a new high-water mark for the UCLA program, the Bruins finished ranked in the top ten.

== Offseason ==
The freshman recruiting class was 2nd in the nation in early rankings by ESPN, and 4th in the final rankings.

=== Departures ===
UCLA departures
Name	Num	Pos.	Height	Year	Hometown	Reason for Departure
Emily Bessoir	11	F	6'4"	Redshirt junior	Munich, Germany	Graduated
Charisma Osborne	20	G	5'9"	Graduate student	Moreno Valley, CA	Graduated
Lina Sontag	21	F	6'3"	Sophomore	Kleinmachnow, Germany	Retired
Camryn Brown	35	G	5'11"	Graduate student	Lewisville, TX	Graduated
Izzy Anstey	43	F	6'4"	Redshirt junior	Melbourne, Australia	Graduated
Christeen Iwuala	22	F	6’2”	Sophomore	San Antonio, Texas	Transferred to Mississippi

=== Incoming ===
UCLA incoming transfers
Name	Pos.	Height	Year	Hometown	Previous school
Janiah Barker	F	6'4"	Junior	Marietta, GA	Texas A&M
Charlisse Leger-Walker	F	5'10"	Graduate student	Waikato, New Zealand	Washington State
Timea Gardiner	F	6'3"	Junior	Ogden, UT	Oregon State

==== Recruiting ====
College recruiting
Name	Hometown	School	Height	Weight	Commit date
Kendall Dudley; W	Centreville, VA	Sidwell Friends School	6 ft 2 in (1.88 m)	N/A	
Kendall Dudley; W	Recruit ratings: ESPN: (96)				
Avary Cain; G	Santa Maria, CA	Saint Joseph High School	6 ft 1 in (1.85 m)	N/A	
Avary Cain; G	Recruit ratings: ESPN: (96)				
Zania Socka-Nguemen; F	Washington, D.C.	Sidwell Friends School	6 ft 3 in (1.91 m)	N/A	
Zania Socka-Nguemen; F	Recruit ratings: ESPN: (95)				
Elina Aarnisalo; G	Helsinki, Finland	Mäkelänrinne Upper Secondary School	5 ft 10 in (1.78 m)	N/A	
Elina Aarnisalo; G	Recruit ratings: ESPN: (N/A)				
Overall recruit ranking: ESPN: 4
Note: In many cases, Scout, Rivals, 247Sports, On3, and ESPN may conflict in their listings of height and weight.; In these cases, the average was taken. ESPN grades are on a 100-point scale.; Sources: "2024 Player Commits". ESPN. Archived from the original on November 17, 2023.

== Roster ==
2024–25 UCLA Bruins women's basketball team
Players
Coaches

Pos.	#	Name	Height	Year	Previous school	Hometown
F	0	Janiah Barker	6 ft 4 in (1.93 m)	Jr	Montverde Academy; Texas A&M	Marietta, GA
G	1	Kiki Rice	5 ft 11 in (1.8 m)	Jr	Sidwell Friends	Bethesda, MD
G	2	Avary Cain	6 ft 1 in (1.85 m)	Fr	St. Joseph	Santa Maria, CA
G	3	Londynn Jones	5 ft 4 in (1.63 m)	Jr	Centennial	Riverside, CA
F	5	Charlisse Leger-Walker (injured) (redshirt)	5 ft 10 in (1.78 m)	GS	St Peter's School, Cambridge; Washington State	Waikato, New Zealand
F	6	Zania Socka-Nguemen	6 ft 3 in (1.91 m)	Fr	Sidwell Friends	Silver Spring, MD
G	7	Elina Aarnisalo	5 ft 10 in (1.78 m)	Fr	Mäkelänrinne Upper Secondary School	Helsinki, Finland
F	11	Gabriela Jaquez	5 ft 11 in (1.8 m)	Jr	Camarillo	Camarillo, CA
F	22	Kendall Dudley	6 ft 2 in (1.88 m)	Fr	Sidwell Friends	Manassas Park, VA
F	30	Timea Gardiner	6 ft 3 in (1.91 m)	Jr	Fremont; Oregon State	Ogden, UT
F	32	Angela Dugalić	6 ft 4 in (1.93 m)	GS	Maine West; Oregon	Des Plaines, IL
F	33	Amanda Muse (redshirt)	6 ft 4 in (1.93 m)	So	Heritage	Brentwood, CA
C	51	Lauren Betts	6 ft 7 in (2.01 m)	Jr	Grandview; Stanford	Centennial, CO

Head coach

- Cori Close (UC Santa Barbara)

Assistant coach(es)

- Shannon Perry-LeBeauf (Iowa)
- Tony Newnan (UC Santa Barbara)
- Tasha Brown (St. Ambrose)
- Soh Matsuura (UCLA)

Legend

- (C) Team captain
- (S) Suspended
- (I) Ineligible
- (W) Walk-on
- Injured
- Current redshirt

Roster
Last update: October 2, 2024

== Schedule and results ==
Date time, TV	Rank^{#}	Opponent^{#}	Result	Record	Site (attendance) city, state
Regular season
November 4, 2024*; 11:30 a.m., ESPN2	No. 5	vs. No. 17 Louisville; Aflac Oui-Play	W 66–59	1–0	Halle Georges Carpentier (3,472); Paris, France
November 10, 2024*; 2:00 p.m., B1G+	No. 5	Colgate	W 81–63	2–0	Pauley Pavilion (3,285); Los Angeles, CA
November 12, 2024*; 11:30 a.m., B1G+	No. 5	Pepperdine	W 91–54	3–0	Pauley Pavilion (3,898); Los Angeles, CA
November 17, 2024*; 4:30 p.m., BTN	No. 5	Arkansas	W 101–52	4–0	Pauley Pavilion (2,255); Los Angeles, CA
November 24, 2024*; 1:00 p.m., FS1	No. 5	No. 1 South Carolina	W 77–62	5–0	Pauley Pavilion (13,659); Los Angeles, CA
November 29, 2024*; 2:00 p.m.	No. 1	vs. UT Martin; Rainbow Wahine Showdown	W 97–37	6–0	SimpliFi Arena; Honolulu, HI
November 30, 2024*; 2:00 p.m.	No. 1	vs. Fresno State; Rainbow Wahine Showdown	W 97–41	7–0	SimpliFi Arena; Honolulu, HI
December 1, 2024*; 4:30 p.m., ESPN+	No. 1	at Hawaii; Rainbow Wahine Showdown	W 70–49	8–0	SimpliFi Arena (2,481); Honolulu, HI
December 8, 2024; 2:00 p.m., B1G+	No. 1	at Washington	W 73–62	9–0 (1–0)	Alaska Airlines Arena (3,453); Seattle, WA
December 14, 2024*; 2:00 p.m., ESPN+	No. 1	at Long Beach State	W 102–51	10–0	Walter Pyramid (2,463); Long Beach, CA
December 16, 2024*; 7:00 p.m., B1G+	No. 1	Cal Poly	W 69–37	11–0	Pauley Pavilion (2,356); Los Angeles, CA
December 20, 2024*; 8:00 p.m., FS1	No. 1	vs. Creighton; Invisalign Bay Area Women's Classic	W 70–41	12–0	Chase Center (3,766); San Francisco, CA
December 29, 2024; 2:00 p.m., B1G+	No. 1	Nebraska	W 91–54	13–0 (2–0)	Pauley Pavilion (5,339); Los Angeles, CA
January 1, 2025; 2:00 p.m., BTN	No. 1	No. 24 Michigan	W 86–70	14–0 (3–0)	Pauley Pavilion (4,566); Los Angeles, CA
January 4, 2025; 9:00 a.m., FOX	No. 1	at Indiana	W 73–62	15–0 (4–0)	Simon Skjodt Assembly Hall (11,528); Bloomington, IN
January 7, 2025; 4:00 p.m., BTN	No. 1	at Purdue	W 83–49	16–0 (5–0)	Mackey Arena (3,742); West Lafayette, IN
January 12, 2025; 2:00 p.m., B1G+	No. 1	Northwestern	W	16–0 (6–0)	Pauley Pavilion; Los Angeles, CA
January 15, 2025; 6:30 p.m., Peacock	No. 1	Penn State	W 83–67	17–0 (7–0)	Walter Pyramid (Note: Game moved from Pauley to the Walter Pyramid in Long Beach due to the ongoing wildfires in Los Angeles.) (1,563); Long Beach, CA
January 20, 2025; 12:00 p.m., FOX	No. 1	vs. No. 25 Baylor; Coretta Scott King Classic	W 72–57	18–0	Prudential Center (6,147); Newark, NJ
January 23, 2025; 4:00 p.m., FS1	No. 1	at Rutgers	W 84–66	19–0 (8–0)	Jersey Mike's Arena (3,138); Piscataway, NJ
January 26, 2025; 11:00 a.m., NBC	No. 1	at No. 8 Maryland	W 82–67	20–0 (9–0)	Xfinity Center (13,648); College Park, MD
February 2, 2025; 12:00 p.m., BTN	No. 1	Minnesota	W 79–53	21–0 (10–0)	Pauley Pavilion (6,184); Los Angeles, CA
February 5, 2025; 6:30 p.m., Peacock	No. 1	No. 8 Ohio State	W 65–52	22–0 (11–0)	Pauley Pavilion (6,822); Los Angeles, CA
February 9, 2025; 1:00 p.m., B1G+	No. 1	at Oregon	W 62–52	23–0 (12–0)	Matthew Knight Arena (6,534); Eugene, OR
February 13, 2025; 7:00 p.m., Peacock	No. 1	at No. 6 USC; Rivalry	L 60–71	23–1 (12–1)	Galen Center (10,258); Los Angeles, CA
February 16, 2025; 6:00 p.m., BTN	No. 1	No. 22 Michigan State	W 75–69	24–1 (13–1)	Pauley Pavilion (7,563); Los Angeles, CA
February 20, 2025; 6:30 p.m., BTN	No. 3	No. 25 Illinois	W 70–55	25–1 (14–1)	Pauley Pavilion (5,435); Los Angeles, CA
February 23, 2025; 11:00 a.m., Peacock	No. 3	at Iowa	W 67–65	26–1 (15–1)	Carver–Hawkeye Arena (14,998); Iowa City, IA
February 26, 2025; 5:00 p.m., Peacock	No. 2	at Wisconsin	W 91–61	27–1 (16–1)	Kohl Center (3,897); Madison, WI
March 1, 2025; 6:00 p.m., FOX	No. 2	No. 4 USC; Rivalry	L 67–80	27–2 (16–2)	Pauley Pavilion (13,659); Los Angeles, CA
Big Ten women's tournament
March 7, 2025; 3:30 p.m., BTN	(2) No. 4	vs. (10) Nebraska; Quarterfinals	W 85–74	28–2	Gainbridge Fieldhouse (7,500); Indianapolis, IN
March 8, 2025; 5:30 p.m., BTN	(2) No. 4	vs. (3) No. 13 Ohio State; Semifinals	W 75–46	29–2	Gainbridge Fieldhouse (7,805); Indianapolis, IN
March 9, 2025; 1:30 p.m., CBS	(2) No. 4	vs. (1) No. 2 USC; Championship/Rivalry	W 72–67	30–2	Gainbridge Fieldhouse (8,358); Indianpolis, IN
NCAA women's tournament
March 21, 2025*; 7:00 p.m., ESPN	(1 S1) No. 1	(16 S1) Southern; First Round	W 84–46	31–2	Pauley Pavilion (5,703); Los Angeles, CA
March 23, 2025*; 7:00 p.m., ESPN	(1 S1) No. 1	(8 S1) Richmond; Second Round	W 84–67	32–2	Pauley Pavilion (6,119); Los Angeles, CA
March 28, 2025*; 7:00 p.m., ESPN	(1 S1) No. 1	vs. (5 S1) No. 25 Ole Miss; Sweet Sixteen	W 76–62	33–2	Spokane Arena (8,789); Spokane, WA
March 30, 2025*; 12:00 p.m., ABC	(1 S1) No. 1	vs. (3 S1) No. 10 LSU; Elite Eight	W 72–65	34–2	Spokane Arena (9,299); Spokane, WA
April 4, 2025*; 6:30 p.m, ESPN	(1 S1) No. 1	vs. (2 S4) No. 3 UConn; Final Four	L 51–85	34–3	Amalie Arena (19,731); Tampa, FL
*Non-conference game. ^{#}Rankings from AP Poll. (#) Tournament seedings in parentheses. S1=Spokane 1. S4=Spokane 4. All times are in Pacific Time. Source:

== Rankings ==
Ranking movements Legend: ██ Increase in ranking ██ Decrease in ranking ( ) = First-place votes
	Week																				
Poll	Pre	1	2	3	4	5	6	7	8	9	10	11	12	13	14	15	16	17	18	19	Final
AP	5	5	5	1 (20)	1 (25)	1 (24)	1 (30)	1 (30)	1 (30)	1 (30)	1 (29)	1 (27)	1 (31)	1 (32)	1 (31)	3 (6)	2 (11)	4	1 (16)	1 (19)	3
Coaches	6	6	6	2 (14)	1 (16)	1 (23)	1 (31)	1 (30)	1 (31)	1 (31)	1 (30)	1 (29)	1 (30)	1 (29)	1 (31)	3 (3)	2 (7)	4	1 (20)	1 (21)	3

== Awards and honors ==
- November 18, 2024 - Lauren Betts was a Big Ten Player of the week.
- January 20, 2027 - Lauren Betts established a school record for blocks in a single game with 9 against Baylor, surpassing the record of 7 she had tied on January 15.
- January 27, 2025 - Lauren Betts was a Big Ten Player of the week.
- February 20, 2025 – Lauren Betts broke the school record with 67 blocks in a season, surpassing Monique Billings. She would finish the season with 100 blocked shots.
- February 24, 2025 - Lauren Betts was a Big Ten Player of the week.
- March 4, 2025 - Big Ten season honors were selected by coaches and media:
  - Lauren Betts was the Big Ten defensive player of the year.
  - Janiah Barker was the Big Ten sixth player of the year.
  - Lauren Betts and Kiki Rice were named to the All-Big Ten first team.
  - Lauren Betts was named to the All-Big Ten defensive team.
- March 9, 2025 – Lauren Betts was named to the Big Ten All-Tournament team and was the most outstanding player
- March 9, 2025 – First Big Ten Tournament Championship and First 30 wins in a season
- March 19, 2025 – Lauren Betts was named as both an AP and a USBWA First Team All–American
- March 20, 2025 – Coach Cori Close was named USBWA Coach of the Year
- March 24, 2025 – Coach Cori Close was named a finalist for the Naismith College Coach of the Year
- March 25, 2025 – Lauren Betts was named one of four finalists for the Naismith Women's Player of the Year
- March 26, 2025 – Tony Newnan was named the WBCA Assistant Coach of the Year
- March 28, 2026 - The Bruins advanced to the Elite 8 for the first time since 2018 and Lauren Betts set a school record for single game field goal percentage, going 15-16 and .938.
- March 30, 2025 - Lauren Betts was the Most Outstanding player of the Spokane 1 regional and was named to all-tournament team along with Kiki Rice and Gabriela Jaquez following their defeat of LSU to reach the NCAA Final Four for the first time.
- April 2, 2025 – Coach Cori Close was the 2025 Naismith Women’s College Coach of the Year
- April 2, 2025 – Lauren Betts was named the 2025 Naismith Women’s College Defensive Player of the Year
- April 2, 2025 – Kiki Rice received the NCAA Elite 90 Award
- April 3, 2025 - Cori Close was named The Associated Press Coach of the Year
- April 4, 2025 – Lauren Betts was named to the John R. Wooden Award Women’s All America team
- April 5, 2025 – Lauren Betts was named the Lisa Leslie Center of The Year
- April 6, 2025 – Lauren Betts was named to the NCAA WBB Final Four all-tournament team
- The team set UCLA women's basketball records for consecutive wins (23), in most regular season wins (27), most total wins (34), winning percentage (.919), single season rebounds (1,573), single season assists (747), single season blocked shots (198) and, in consecutive weeks ranked No. 1 in the country (12) by the Associated Press.
- Lauren Betts became the school record holder in field goal percentage at .646 over previous record holder Denise Curry. Betts topped her previous school record in single-season field goal percentage at .648.
