= Ashlon Jackson =

American basketball player (born 2004)

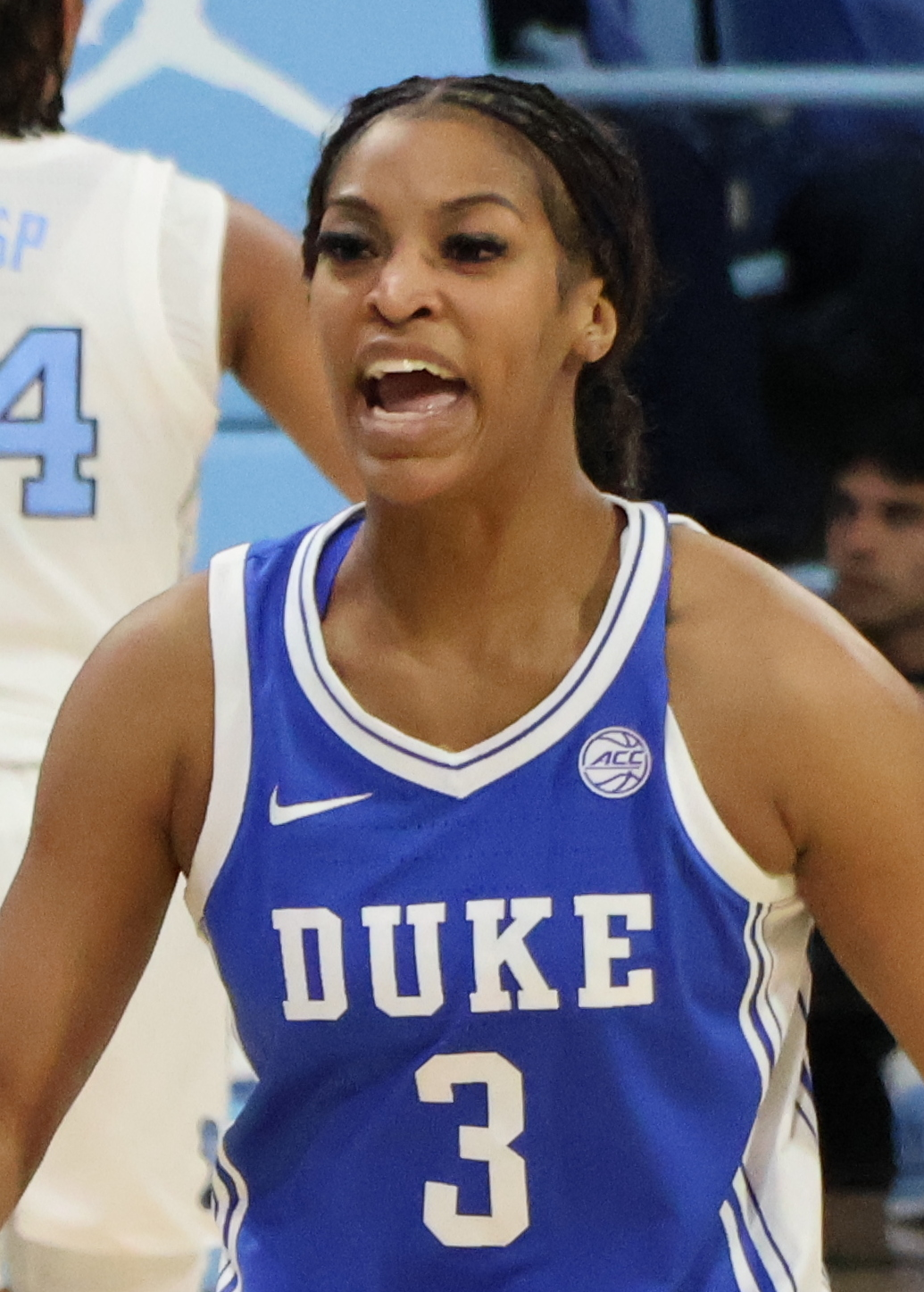
- Jackson with Duke in 2025

No. 3 – Houston Comets
- Position: Guard
- League: WNBA

Personal information
- Born: January 6, 2004 (age 22)
- Listed height: 6 ft 0 in (1.83 m)
- Listed weight: 170 lb (77 kg)

Career information
- High school: Hardin-Jefferson (Sour Lake, Texas)
- College: Duke (2022–2026)
- WNBA draft: 2026: 2nd round, 23rd overall pick
- Drafted by: Golden State Valkyries
- Playing career: 2026–present

Career history
- 2026: Connecticut Sun
- 2027–present: Houston Comets

Career highlights
- First-team All-ACC (2026); Second-team All-ACC (2025); McDonald's All-American (2022)
- Stats at Basketball Reference

Ashlon Octavia Jackson (born January 6, 2004) is an American professional basketball player for the Houston Comets of the Women's National Basketball Association (WNBA). She played college basketball at Duke.

== High school career ==
Jackson attended Hardin-Jefferson. During her freshman year she averaged 17.6 points, 6.1 rebounds and 5.8 assists per game. During her sophomore year she averaged 21.6 points, 7.6 rebounds and 7.3 assists per game. During her junior year she averaged 22.6 points, 5.8 assists, 4.6 rebounds, 4.9 steals and 1.3 blocks per game. During her senior year she averaged 19.4 points, 5.6 assists, 4.3 rebounds, 4.2 steals and 1.5 blocks per game. She led Hardin-Jefferson to three straight state tournament appearances, including the state championship game as a senior. She finished her high school career with 2,683 points, 705 assists, 695 rebounds, 561 steals and 205 blocked shots. She was ranked the No. 16 player in her class by ESPN and selected to compete in the 2022 McDonald's All-American Girls Game.

== College career ==
On January 6, 2021, Jackson committed to play college basketball at Duke. During the 2022–23 season, in her freshman year, she appeared in 33 games off the bench. During the 2023–24 season, in her sophomore year, she averaged 9.2 points, 2.5 rebounds and 2.6 assists per game.

During the 2024–25 season, in her junior year, she started all 37 games and ranked second on the team in points (460) and scoring average (12.4) and third in assists (78) and three-point shooting (.372). She tied the program single-season record for three-pointers with 87. On November 25, 2024, she scored a career-high 30 points against Kansas State. Following the season she was named to the All-ACC second-team.

Prior to the 2025–26 season, she was named to the pre-season watchlists for the John R. Wooden Award, Naismith College Player of the Year and Ann Meyers Drysdale Award. During her senior year, she averaged 11.2 points, 3.3 rebounds and 4.6 assists per game. Following the season she was named to the All-ACC first-team by the coaches. On March 27, 2026, during the Sweet 16 of the 2026 NCAA tournament against LSU, she scored the game-winning buzzer-beating three-point shot to help Duke advance to the Elite Eight.

== Professional career ==
=== WNBA ===
On April 13, 2026, Jackson was drafted in the second round, 23rd overall, by the Golden State Valkyries in the 2026 WNBA draft. She was waived by the Golden State Valkyries on May 2. On May 6, Jackson signed with the Connecticut Sun on a developmental contract.

== Career statistics ==
Legend
| GP | Games played | GS | Games started | MPG | Minutes per game | RPG | Rebounds per game |
| APG | Assists per game | SPG | Steals per game | BPG | Blocks per game | PPG | Points per game |
| TO | Turnovers per game | FG% | Field-goal percentage | 3P% | 3-point field-goal percentage | FT% | Free-throw percentage |
| **Bold** | Career best | ° | League leader |

=== College ===
| Year | Team | GP | GS | MPG | FG% | 3P% | FT% | RPG | APG | SPG | BPG | TO | PPG |
|---|---|---|---|---|---|---|---|---|---|---|---|---|---|
| 2022–23 | Duke | 33 | 0 | 13.4 | 31.5 | 31.3 | 75.0 | 1.0 | 0.9 | 0.5 | 0.3 | **0.7** | 3.2 |
| 2023–24 | Duke | 33 | 33 | 29.0 | **38.4** | 36.2 | 78.1 | 2.5 | 2.6 | 0.9 | 0.3 | 2.1 | 9.2 |
| 2024–25 | Duke | **37** | **37** | 29.0 | 37.2 | **37.2** | **86.8** | 2.4 | 2.1 | 1.0 | 0.2 | 1.4 | **12.4** |
| 2025–26 | Duke | 36 | 36 | **33.9** | 34.3 | 30.7 | 81.3 | **3.3** | **4.6** | **1.4** | **0.4** | 2.2 | 11.2 |
| **Career** | | 139 | 106 | 26.6 | 36.0 | 34.2 | 81.5 | 2.3 | 2.6 | 1.0 | 0.3 | 1.6 | 9.2 |
Statistics retrieved from Sports-Reference.
