= Justine Pissott =

American basketball player (born 2004)

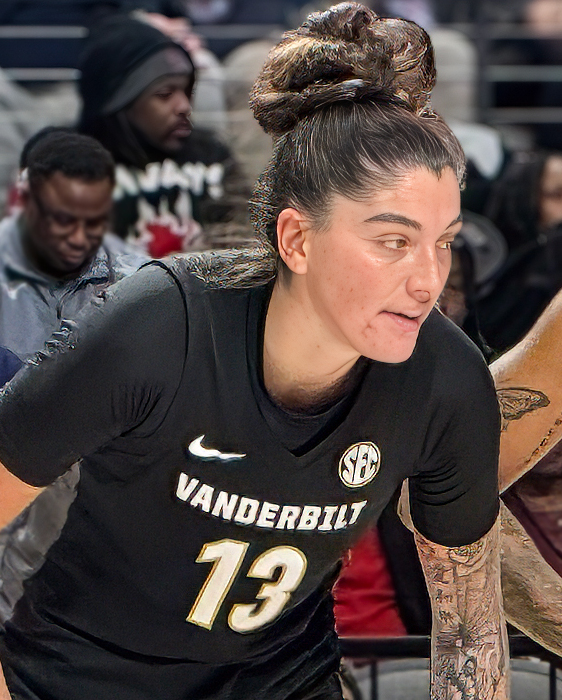
- Pissott with Vanderbilt in 2026

No. 13 – Las Vegas Aces
- Position: Guard/Forward
- League: WNBA

Personal information
- Born: February 4, 2004 (age 22) Brick Township, New Jersey, U.S.
- Listed height: 6 ft 4 in (1.93 m)
- Listed weight: 175 lb (79 kg)

Career information
- High school: Red Bank Catholic (Red Bank, New Jersey)
- College: Tennessee (2022–2023); Vanderbilt (2023–2026)
- WNBA draft: 2026: 2nd round, 25th overall pick
- Drafted by: Indiana Fever

Career history
- 2026–present: Las Vegas Aces

Career highlights
- McDonald's All-American (2022)
- Stats at Basketball Reference
Medals
Representing the United States
FIBA Under-18 Americas Championship
Gold medal – first place	2022 Argentina	Team

Justine Pissott (born February 4, 2004) is an American professional basketball player for the Las Vegas Aces of the Women's National Basketball Association (WNBA). She played college basketball at Tennessee and Vanderbilt.

== High school career ==
Pissott attended Red Bank Catholic High School. During her junior year year, she averaged 17.0 points, 8.0 rebounds, 3.0 assists, 1.3 steals, and 1.1 blocks per game, in a season that was shortened due to the COVID-19 pandemic. During her senior year she averaged 17.4 points, 7.2 rebounds, 3.5 assists, 1.5 steals and 1.4 blocks per game. She finished her high school career with 1,058 points in 76 career games, and recorded a school record 182 career three-point field goals. She was ranked a five-star recruit and the No. 11 player in her class by ESPN. On January 25, 2022, she was selected to compete in the 2022 McDonald's All-American Girls Game.

== College career ==
On October 8, 2020, Pissott committed to play college basketball at Tennessee. She officially signed her National Letter of Intent on November 10, 2022. During the 2022–23 season, in her freshman year, she appeared in 27 games off the bench and averaged 2.0 points and 1.0 rebounds per game.

On May 4, 2023, she transferred to Vanderbilt. During the 2023–24 season, in her sophomore year, she appeared in 33 games, with 28 starts, and averaged 6.8 points per game and ranked second on the team with 52 made three-pointers. On December 20, 2023, she scored a career-high 17 points against Dayton. During the 2024–25 season, in her junior year, she appeared in 23 games off the bench and averaged 3.6 points per game. During the 2025–26 season, in her senior year, she averaged 11.1 points, 4.5 rebounds and 2.3 assists per game, all career-highs.

== Professional career ==
On April 13, 2026, Pissott was drafted in the second round, 25th overall, by the Indiana Fever in the 2026 WNBA draft. She signed a player development contract with the Fever and played in one preseason game. On July 7, 2026, she signed a rest-of-season contract with the Las Vegas Aces after she received an offer sheet from the team and Indiana declined to match it. She made her WNBA debut for the Aces on July 11, 2026, against the Phoenix Mercury and scored 19 points in ten minutes off the bench. She set a WNBA record for the most made three-pointers in a debut, going 5-for-6 from beyond the arc.

== National team career ==
Pissott represented the United States at the 2022 FIBA Under-18 Women's Americas Championship where she averaged 6.0 points, 3.5 rebounds and 2.8 assists in six games and won a gold medal.

== Personal life ==
Pissott was born to Jim and Josephine Pissott, and has a twin sister, Georgia, and a younger brother, Robby.

== Career statistics ==
Legend
GP	Games played	GS	Games started	MPG	Minutes per game	RPG	Rebounds per game
APG	Assists per game	SPG	Steals per game	BPG	Blocks per game	PPG	Points per game
TO	Turnovers per game	FG%	Field-goal percentage	3P%	3-point field-goal percentage	FT%	Free-throw percentage
**Bold**	Career best	°	League leader

=== WNBA ===
==== Regular season ====
WNBA regular season statistics
Year	Team	GP	GS	MPG	FG%	3P%	FT%	RPG	APG	SPG	BPG	TO	PPG
2026	Las Vegas	10	0	8.7	.361	.370	1.000	1.0	.4	.2	.3	.3	3.8
**Career**	1 year, 1 team	10	0	8.7	.361	.370	1.000	1.0	.4	.2	.3	.3	3.8

==== Playoffs ====
WNBA playoff statistics
Year	Team	GP	GS	MPG	FG%	3P%	FT%	RPG	APG	SPG	BPG	TO	PPG
2026	Las Vegas	4	0	1.5	.000	.000	—	.5	.0	.0	.0	.0	.0
**Career**	1 year, 1 team	4	0	1.5	.000	.000	—	.5	.0	.0	.0	.0	.0

=== College ===
Year	Team	GP	GS	MPG	FG%	3P%	FT%	RPG	APG	SPG	BPG	TO	PPG
2022–23	Tennessee	27	0	7.0	.333	.261	**1.000**	1.0	.4	.0	.1	**.4**	2.0
2023–24	Vanderbilt	33	28	21.2	.356	.369	.750	2.2	.8	.3	.5	1.2	6.8
2024–25	Vanderbilt	23	0	9.7	.431	.388	.667	1.7	.4	.2	.1	**.4**	3.6
2025–26	Vanderbilt	**34**	**34**	**29.5**	**.437**	**.422**	.765	**4.5**	**2.3**	**.4**	**.9**	1.5	**11.1**
**Career**		117	62	18.0	.399	.386	.745	2.5	1.0	.3	.4	1.0	6.3
Statistics retrieved from Sports-Reference
