= Gabriela Jaquez =

American basketball player (born 2003)

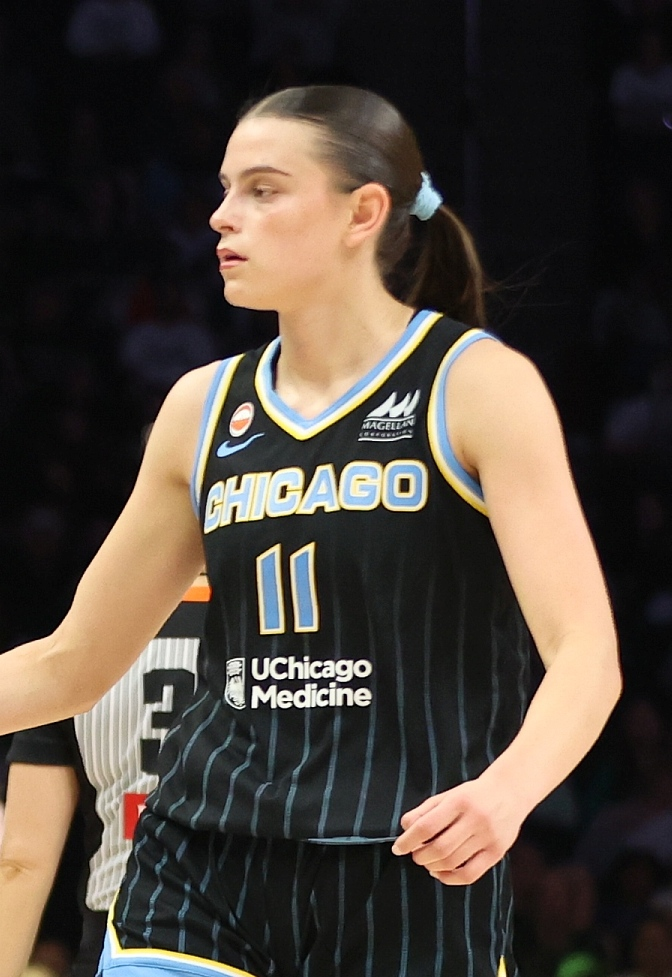
- Jaquez with the Chicago Sky in 2026

No. 11 – Chicago Sky
- Position: Guard
- League: WNBA

Personal information
- Born: November 19, 2003 (age 22) Irvine, California, U.S.
- Listed height: 6 ft 0 in (1.83 m)

Career information
- High school: Camarillo (Camarillo, California)
- College: UCLA (2022–2026)
- WNBA draft: 2026: 1st round, 5th overall pick
- Drafted by: Chicago Sky
- Playing career: 2026–present

Career history
- 2026–present: Chicago Sky

Career highlights
- NCAA champion (2026); Second-team All-Big Ten (2026); McDonald's All-American Game co-MVP (2022)
- Stats at Basketball Reference

Gabriela Raquel Jaquez (born November 19, 2003) is a Mexican-American professional basketball player for the Chicago Sky of the Women's National Basketball Association (WNBA). She played college basketball for the UCLA Bruins, winning a national championship in 2026.

== High school career ==
Jaquez played basketball for Adolfo Camarillo High School in Camarillo, California. As a senior, she averaged 34.2 points and 15.7 rebounds per game and was named Ventura County Star Player of the Year. Jaquez shared most valuable player honors in the McDonald's All-American Game with her future college teammate Kiki Rice. Rated a five-star recruit, she committed to play college basketball for UCLA over offers from Utah, Oklahoma, Washington State, and USC, among other programs. The UCLA 2022 recruiting class was ranked number one in the nation by ESPN. She wore jersey number 11 her senior year at Camarillo. She also wore number 4.

== College career ==
Predicting she would play at UCLA since writing it down in third grade, Jaquez had a notable career, being part of four teams that played in the NCAA tournament.

As a freshman at UCLA, Jaquez averaged 6.3 points and 3.5 rebounds per game. On November 12, 2023, she scored a career-high 30 points and 12 rebounds in a 113–64 win over Bellarmine. In her sophomore season, Jaquez averaged 10 points and 5.6 rebounds per game. She joined the UCLA softball team in the 2024 NCAA tournament, having previously played the sport in high school. Nicknamed by the Bruins "All Gas Gabs" for her hustle, Jaquez scored a run in her collegiate softball debut during the NCAA super regional.

In her junior season, she was a starter and key player for the 2024–25 Bruins team. This was the first Bruins team to advance to the NCAA Final Four, where the team lost to the eventual national champion UConn.

She was a starter for their Big Ten champion team in 2025–26 in her senior season. In the 2026 national championship game, Jaquez had a double-double with a game-high 21 points, 10 rebounds and five assists in a 79–51 victory over South Carolina. She was voted to the Final Four all-tournament team. At 124 wins, she has the most of any player in UCLA program history. Jaquez wore number 23 when first joining the Bruins as Emily Bessoir wore number 11. She switched to 11 for the 2024–25 season.

== Professional career ==
On April 13, 2026, the Chicago Sky selected Jaquez as the fifth overall pick of the 2026 WNBA draft.

== National team career ==
In August 2024, Jaquez made her debut for the Mexico women's national basketball team during 2026 FIBA Women's World Cup pre-qualification.

== Personal life ==
Jaquez is the daughter of Angela and Jaime Sr., who both played basketball at Concordia University. Her paternal grandfather, Ezequiel, came to California with his family from Mexico as a child and played basketball at Arizona State College (now Northern Arizona University). Her older brother, Jaime Jr., plays in the National Basketball Association for the Milwaukee Bucks and competed for the UCLA men's team in college.

== Career statistics ==
Legend
GP	Games played	GS	Games started	MPG	Minutes per game	RPG	Rebounds per game
APG	Assists per game	SPG	Steals per game	BPG	Blocks per game	PPG	Points per game
TO	Turnovers per game	FG%	Field-goal percentage	3P%	3-point field-goal percentage	FT%	Free-throw percentage
**Bold**	Career best	°	League leader

=== College ===
Year	Team	GP	GS	MPG	FG%	3P%	FT%	RPG	APG	SPG	BPG	TO	PPG
2022–23	UCLA	37	2	17.4	45.5	34.0	63.2	3.5	0.6	0.9	0.1	**0.9**	6.3
2023–24	UCLA	34	6	25.2	47.8	25.9	71.3	**5.6**	1.6	0.6	0.1	1.4	10.0
2024–25	UCLA	36	33	26.7	52.3	34.8	82.6	5.3	**2.2**	0.6	0.1	**0.9**	9.6
2025–26	UCLA	**38**	**38**	**30.4**	**53.9**	**39.0**	**86.0**	5.5	2.1	**1.1**	0.1	1.8	**13.5**
**Career**		145	79	25.0	50.4	34.1	76.8	5.0	1.6	0.8	0.1	1.3	9.9
Statistics retrieved from Sports-Reference.
