= 2022 McDonald's All-American Girls Game =

West	East
95	75
- Date: March 29, 2022
- Venue: Wintrust Arena, Chicago, Illinois
- MVP: Gabriela Jaquez & Kiki Rice
- Network: ESPN2

McDonald's All-American

The 2022 McDonald's All-American Girls Game was an all-star basketball game that was held on March 29, 2022. The game's rosters featured the best and most highly recruited high school girls graduating in the class of 2022. The game was the 20th annual version of the McDonald's All-American Game first played in 2002. Due to the impact of the COVID-19 pandemic, the game had not been held since 2019. The 24 players were selected from over 700 nominees by a committee of basketball experts. They were chosen not only for their on-court skills, but for their performances off the court as well.

== Rosters ==
Eleven of the 24 players headed to the Pac-12 Conference, while the SEC and ACC each grabbed 5. Arizona, Oregon, Oregon State, South Carolina, Stanford, UCLA, and UConn each lead the way with 2 McDonald's All-Americans.

=== Team East ===
ESPNW 100 Rank	Name	Height	Position	Hometown	High school	College choice
3	Janiah Barker	6–2	F	Montverde Academy	Tampa, Florida	Georgia
21	Paris Clark	5–8	G	Long Island Lutheran	Mount Vernon, New York	Arizona
18	Talaysia Cooper	6–0	G	East Clarendon	Turbeville, South Carolina	South Carolina
7	Chance Gray	5–9	G	Winton Woods	Hamilton, Ohio	Oregon
14	Ta'Niya Latson	5–8	G	American Heritage	Plantation, Florida	Florida State
20	Indya Nivar	5–9	G	Apex Friendship	Apex, North Carolina	Stanford
25	Kyla Oldacre	6–5	C	William Mason	Mason, Ohio	Miami
4	Ayanna Patterson	6–2	G/F	Homestead	Fort Wayne, Indiana	UConn
11	Justine Pissott	6–2	G/F	Red Bank Catholic High	Toms River, New Jersey	Tennessee
2	Kiki Rice	5–11	G	Sidwell Friends School	Washington, DC	UCLA
13	Grace VanSlooten	6–3	F	IMG Academy	Ottawa, Ohio	Oregon
12	Ashlyn Watkins	6–3	F	Cardinal Newman	Columbia, South Carolina	South Carolina

=== Team West ===
ESPNW 100 Rank	Name	Height	Position	Hometown	High school	College choice
10	Raegan Beers	6–2	F	Valor Christian	Littleton, Colorado	Oregon State
1	Lauren Betts	6–7	C	Grandview	Centennial, Colorado	Stanford
5	Isuneh Brady	6–3	F	Cathedral Catholic	San Diego, California	UConn
29	KK Bransford	5–10	G	Mount Notre Dame	Cincinnati, Ohio	Notre Dame
6	Timea Gardiner	6–3	F	Fremont	Plain City, Utah	Oregon State
8	Aaliyah Gayles	5–9	G	Spring Valley	Las Vegas, Nevada	USC
16	Ashlon Jackson	5–10	G	Hardin Jefferson High	Sour Lake, Texas	Duke
19	Gabriela Jaquez	6–0	F	Adolfo Camarillo	Camarillo, California	UCLA
26	Flau'jae Johnson	5–10	G	Sprayberry	Marietta, Georgia	LSU
17	Darianna Littlepage-Buggs	6–1	G/F	Classen	Oklahoma City, Oklahoma	Baylor
9	Maya Nnaji	6–4	F	Hopkins	Hopkins, Minnesota	Arizona
15	Ruby Whitehorn	6–0	G	Detroit Edison Public Academy	Detroit, Michigan	Clemson
