= Chance Gray =

American basketball player

- Gray with the Los Angeles Sparks in 2026

No. 2 – Los Angeles Sparks
- Position: Guard
- League: WNBA

Personal information
- Born: July 6, 2004 (age 22) Cincinnati, Ohio, U.S.
- Listed height: 5 ft 9 in (1.75 m)

Career information
- High school: Winton Woods (Forest Park, Ohio)
- College: Oregon (2022–2024); Ohio State (2024–2026)
- WNBA draft: 2026: 2nd round, 24th overall pick
- Drafted by: Los Angeles Sparks
- Playing career: 2026–present

Career history
- 2026–present: Los Angeles Sparks

Career highlights
- Pac-12 All-Freshman team (2023); McDonald's All-American (2022)
- Stats at Basketball Reference
Medals
Women's basketball
Representing United States
FIBA AmeriCup
Silver medal – second place	2023 Mexico	Team

Chance Gray (born July 6, 2004) is an American professional basketball player for the Los Angeles Sparks of the Women's National Basketball Association (WNBA). She played college basketball for the Oregon Ducks and Ohio State Buckeyes.

== Early life ==
Gray attended Lakota West High School before transferring to Winton Woods High School in Forest Park, Ohio, for her senior year. As a senior, she played in the McDonald's All-American Game. Gray finished her senior season averaging 26.7 points, 5.0 rebounds, 3.5 assists and 3.1 steals per game, being named the Ohio Gatorade Player of the Year. At the conclusion of the season, she was named to the Naismith National High School All-America first team. A five-star recruit, Gray committed to play college basketball at the University of Oregon.

== College career ==
Gray made an immediate impact as a true freshman, establishing herself as a starter in the Ducks’ lineup. She was named Pac-12 Freshman of the Week once after scoring a then career-high 22 points against Washington State, making five three-point field goals. Gray concluded her freshman campaign with averages of 10.3 points, 2.2 assists, and 2.1 rebounds per game, and was named to the Pac-12 All-Freshman Team. Her production increased during her sophomore season, as she averaged 13.9 points and 3.0 assists per game, leading the team in both categories. Gray entered the transfer portal following the conclusion of the season.

On April 14, 2024, Gray announced her decision to transfer to Ohio State University to play for the Ohio State Buckeyes. In her first season with the Buckeyes, she scored a career-high 31 points and set a school record with nine three-point field goals in a win against Charlotte. Gray concluded her junior season having started 33 games and averaging 12 points per game. She returned to Ohio State for her final season of collegiate basketball.Gray was named to the 2026 Big Ten All-Tournament Team for her performance, averaging 18 points per game and shooting 44.7% across three games. She concluded her final season averaging a career-high 14.7 points per game, along with 2.5 rebounds and 2.7 assists per game.

== Professional career ==
On April 13, 2026, Gray was drafted in the second round, 24th overall, by the Los Angeles Sparks in the 2026 WNBA draft.

== National team career ==
Gray made her United States national team debut at the 2023 FIBA Women's AmeriCup in Mexico. She averaged 1.2 points, 1.2 rebounds and 0.3 assists, helping her team win the silver medal.

== Career statistics ==
Legend
GP	Games played	GS	Games started	MPG	Minutes per game	RPG	Rebounds per game
APG	Assists per game	SPG	Steals per game	BPG	Blocks per game	PPG	Points per game
TO	Turnovers per game	FG%	Field-goal percentage	3P%	3-point field-goal percentage	FT%	Free-throw percentage
**Bold**	Career best	°	League leader

=== WNBA ===
WNBA regular season statistics
Year	Team	GP	GS	MPG	FG%	3P%	FT%	RPG	APG	SPG	BPG	TO	PPG
2026	Los Angeles	40	0	11.5	.373	.359	.870	1.1	1.0	.2	.0	.6	3.1
**Career**	1 year, 1 team	40	0	11.5	.373	.359	.870	1.1	1.0	.2	.0	.6	3.1

=== College ===
Year	Team	GP	GS	MPG	FG%	3P%	FT%	RPG	APG	SPG	BPG	TO	PPG
2022–23	Oregon	**35**	**35**	30.2	.342	.331	.873	2.1	2.2	9.7	**.1**	1.6	10.3
2023–24	Oregon	31	31	**36.5**	.347	.337	.811	**2.9**	**3.0**	.8	.0	2.7	13.9
2024–25	Ohio State	33	33	27.6	.398	.348	.841	1.8	1.5	**1.4**	**.1**	**1.2**	12.0
2025–26	Ohio State	**35**	**35**	32.1	**.453**	**.405**	**.886**	2.5	2.7	.9	.0	1.8	**14.7**
**Career**		134	134	31.5	.385	.358	.850	2.3	2.3	.9	.1	1.8	12.7
Statistics retrieved from Sports-Reference.
