= Grace VanSlooten =

American basketball player (born 2004)

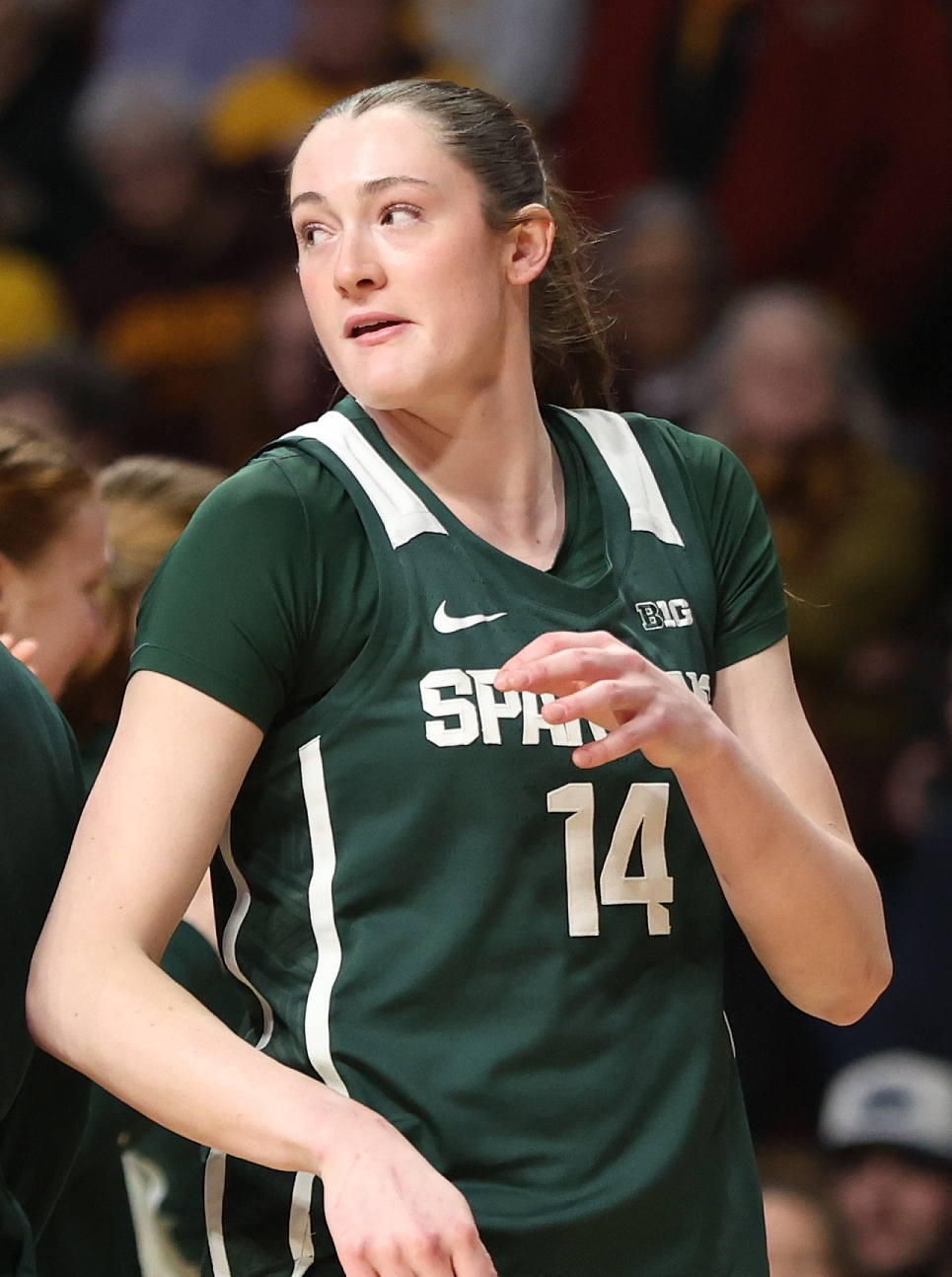
- VanSlooten with Michigan State in 2026

No. 14 – Indiana Fever
- Position: Forward
- League: WNBA

Personal information
- Born: June 16, 2004 (age 22) Toledo, Ohio, U.S.
- Listed height: 6 ft 3 in (1.91 m)

Career information
- High school: Notre Dame Academy (Toledo, Ohio); IMG Academy (Bradenton, Florida)
- College: Oregon (2022–2024); Michigan State (2024–2026)
- WNBA draft: 2026: 3rd round, 39th overall pick
- Drafted by: Seattle Storm

Career highlights
- 2× Second-team All-Big Ten (2025, 2026); Pac-12 All-Freshman team (2023); McDonald's All-American (2022)
- Stats at Basketball Reference
Medals
Women's basketball
Representing the United States
FIBA AmeriCup
| Gold medal – first place | 2025 Chile |
FIBA Under-19 World Cup
| Gold medal – first place | 2023 Spain | Team |
FIBA Under-18 Americas Championship
| Gold medal – first place | 2022 Argentina | Team |

Grace VanSlooten (born June 16, 2004) is an American player for the Indiana Fever of the Women's National Basketball Association (WNBA). She was signed to an end-of-year contract by the Indiana Fever on 5/22/2026 after being released by the Seattle Storm. She played college basketball for the Michigan State Spartans of the Big Ten Conference. She previously played for Oregon.

== High school career ==
VanSlooten was born to Jon and Michelle VanSlooten. She played three years at Notre Dame Academy in Toledo, Ohio, before playing for IMG Academy during her senior year. During her junior year, she averaged 21.8 points and 12.5 rebounds per game, and was named a finalist for Ohio's Ms. Basketball. In three seasons at Notre Dame, she recorded 1,094 points and 635 rebounds.

She was a five-star recruit and ranked the No. 13 overall player in the class of 2022 and the No. 4 forward in the class by ESPN. She was named a 2022 McDonald's All-American. On October 7, 2021, she committed to play college basketball at Oregon.

== College career ==
During the 2022–23 season, in her freshman year, she appeared in 32 games, with 30 starts, and averaged 13.2 points, 5.6 rebounds, and 1.8 assists per game, while shooting 46.5 percent from the field. She was one of only three Power 5 freshmen to average at least 13.0 points and 5.0 rebounds while shooting 45.0 percent or better from the field. She ranked second on the team in scoring and second in the conference among freshmen in scoring. She ranked fifth in program history among freshmen with 423 points, and third in program history among freshmen with 113 free throws. Following the season, she was named to the Pac-12 all-freshman team. On December 20, 2022, during the semifinals of the San Diego Invitational against Arkansas, she recorded 26 points and six rebounds. The next day, she scored a career-high 29 points in a game against Ohio State. She averaged 27.5 points per game at the San Diego Invitational and was named the Pac-12 Freshman of the Week and Pac-12 Player of the Week. She became the third player in conference history to sweep both weekly awards, and the first to do so since Sabrina Ionescu on February 13, 2017. Following the season she was named to the Pac-12 all-freshman team.

During the 2023–24 season, in her sophomore year, she started all 31 games and averaged 15.0 points, 7.1 rebounds, 2.6 assists, and 1.1 steals per game. She led the team in scoring, scoring in double figures in 27 games. She ranked second on the team with eight double-doubles. During conference play, she averaged 14.4 points, 5.9 rebounds, 2.5 assists, and 1.0 steals per game, and was named a Pac-12 honorable mention.

On April 15, 2024, VanSlooten transferred to Michigan State. During the 2024–25 season, in her junior year, she appeared in 31 games, with 23 starts, and averaged 15.5 points, 7.3 rebounds, 1.7 assists and 1.0 steals per game. On November 5, 2024, in her season debut for the Spartans, she scored 15 points, grabbed 9 rebounds, and recorded 2 steals against Oakland. On November 27, 2024, during the championship game of the Acrisure Holiday Invitational against Vanderbilt, she scored a game-high 25 points and 10 rebounds, for her second double-double of the season. She also added a career-high five steals and four blocks. With her 25 points during the game, she surpassed 1,000 career points. Following the season she was named a second team All-Big Ten honoree by both the coaches and media.

== National team career ==
VanSlooten represented the United States at the 2023 FIBA Under-19 Women's Basketball World Cup. During the tournament, she averaged 8.4 points and 4.1 rebounds in seven games and helped the United States win a gold medal.

On June 19, 2025, she was named to Team USA's roster for the 2025 FIBA Women's AmeriCup. During the tournament, she averaged 5.6 points, 4.7 rebounds, and 0.9 assists per game and won a gold medal.

== Professional career ==
=== WNBA ===
VanSlooten was signed to an end-of-year contract by the Indiana Fever on May 22, 2026, after being released by the Seattle Storm on May 18. Selected 39th overall in the 2026 WNBA Draft, she had played in four games before being waived by Seattle, including a game on May 17 against Indiana, finishing with five points, three assists, two rebounds, two steals, and two blocks in 18 minutes.

== Career statistics ==
=== WNBA ===
==== Regular season ====
WNBA regular season statistics
| Year | Team | GP | GS | MPG | FG% | 3P% | FT% | RPG | APG | SPG | BPG | TO | PPG |
|---|---|---|---|---|---|---|---|---|---|---|---|---|---|
| 2026 | Seattle | 4 | 0 | 12.0 | .625 | .667 | .625 | 1.5 | .8 | 1.0 | .8 | .3 | 4.3 |
| 2026 | Indiana | 15 | 0 | 3.1 | 1.000 | — | .714 | .4 | .1 | .0 | .1 | .2 | 1.1 |
| Career | 1 year, 2 teams | 19 | 0 | 4.9 | .786 | .667 | .667 | .6 | .2 | .2 | .2 | .2 | 1.8 |

==== Playoffs ====
WNBA regular season statistics
| Year | Team | GP | GS | MPG | FG% | 3P% | FT% | RPG | APG | SPG | BPG | TO | PPG |
|---|---|---|---|---|---|---|---|---|---|---|---|---|---|
| 2026 | Indiana | 1 | 0 | 2.0 | — | — | 1.000 | .0 | .0 | .0 | .0 | .0 | 2.0 |
| Career | 1 year, 1 team | 1 | 0 | 2.0 | — | — | 1.000 | .0 | .0 | .0 | .0 | .0 | 2.0 |

=== College ===
| Year | Team | GP | GS | MPG | FG% | 3P% | FT% | RPG | APG | SPG | BPG | TO | PPG |
|---|---|---|---|---|---|---|---|---|---|---|---|---|---|
| 2022–23 | Oregon | 32 | 30 | 27.1 | .465 | .000 | .702 | 5.6 | 1.8 | 1.0 | .9 | 1.7 | 13.2 |
| 2023–24 | Oregon | 31 | 31 | 35.2 | .396 | .069 | .663 | 7.1 | 2.6 | 1.1 | .7 | 2.6 | 15.0 |
| 2024–25 | Michigan State | 31 | 23 | 26.4 | .521 | — | .632 | 7.3 | 1.8 | 1.2 | 1.1 | 2.3 | 15.5 |
| 2025–26 | Michigan State | 32 | 32 | 28.7 | .500 | .500 | .659 | 6.8 | 2.3 | 1.9 | 1.0 | 2.0 | 15.1 |
| Career | | 126 | 116 | 29.3 | .467 | .094 | .663 | 6.7 | 2.1 | 1.3 | .9 | 2.1 | 14.7 |
Statistics retrieved from Sports-Reference
