= Indya Nivar =

American basketball player (born 2004)

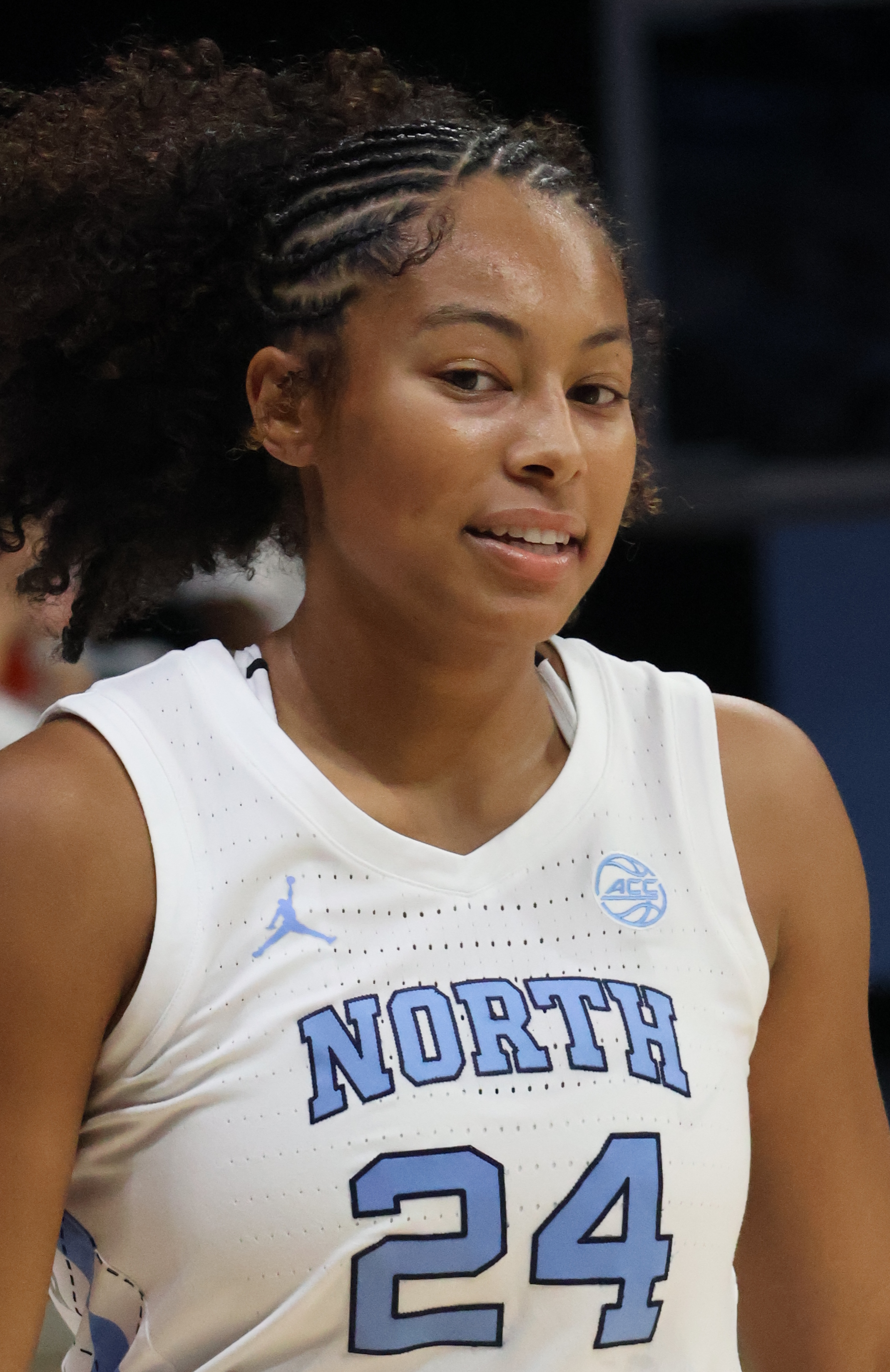
- Nivar with North Carolina in 2024

No. 21 – Atlanta Dream
- Position: Guard
- League: WNBA

Personal information
- Born: January 16, 2004 (age 22) Fayetteville, North Carolina, U.S.
- Listed height: 5 ft 10 in (1.78 m)

Career information
- High school: Apex Friendship (Apex, North Carolina)
- College: Stanford (2022–2023); North Carolina (2023–2026)
- WNBA draft: 2026: 2nd round, 28th overall pick
- Drafted by: Atlanta Dream
- Playing career: 2026–present

Career history
- 2026–present: Atlanta Dream

Career highlights
- Second-team All-ACC (2026); ACC All-Defensive Team (2026); McDonald's All-American (2022); North Carolina Miss Basketball (2022)
- Stats at Basketball Reference
Medals
Women's basketball
Representing the United States
FIBA Under-18 Americas Championship
| Gold medal – first place | 2022 Argentina | Team |

Indya Nivar (born January 16, 2004) is an American professional basketball player for the Atlanta Dream of the Women's National Basketball Association (WNBA). She played college basketball for the Stanford Cardinal and the North Carolina Tar Heels.

== Early life and high school career ==
Nivar was born in Fayetteville, North Carolina, to Ebony Crooms-Nivar and Kenny Nivar, and has a younger sister. She played multiple sports growing up, including gymnastics, basketball, volleyball, and track, competing in the latter three at Apex Friendship High School in Apex, North Carolina. In her senior season, she averaged 18 points, 8.5 rebounds, 3.8 assists, and 3.5 steals per game and was named North Carolina Miss Basketball, the North Carolina Gatorade Player of the Year, and McDonald's All-American. She led Apex to the NCHSAA 4A state championship game, finishing runner-up but being named the tournament's MVP. A five-star recruit ranked the 20th-best player in the 2022 class by ESPN, she committed to Stanford over offers from North Carolina and NC State.

== College career ==
=== Stanford Cardinal ===
Nivar made her college debut for the Stanford Cardinal on November 7, 2022, scoring a season-high 13 points in the season-opening 86–48 win against San Diego State. She appeared in all 35 games as Stanford won a share of the Pac-12 Conference regular-season title. She finished her freshman season averaging 3.2 points, 2.0 rebounds, and 1.0 assists, in 12.6 minutes per game. After the season, she chose to enter the NCAA transfer portal and returned to her home state with the North Carolina Tar Heels. North Carolina head coach Courtney Banghart said Nivar told her she "didn't know we'd get good so fast".

=== North Carolina Tar Heels ===
Nivar made her North Carolina debut on November 8, 2023, coming off the bench to score a game-high 17 points and get 11 rebounds in the season-opening 102–49 win against Gardner–Webb. She was the first North Carolina player to record a double-double on her debut since 2013. She appeared in all 33 games in her sophomore season, averaging 6.4 points and 4.3 rebounds per game. She became a starter in her junior season with the Tar Heels, recording 8.3 points, 4.5 rebounds, 2.0 assists, and 2.0 steals per game. In her senior year in 2025–26, she earned second-team All-ACC and ACC All-Defensive honors after posting 10.6 points, 5.2 rebounds, 3.7 assists, and 2.7 steals per game. On March 27, 2026, she scored a career-high 20 points in her last college game: a 63–42 loss to UConn in the NCAA tournament, the program's second consecutive sweet sixteen appearance.

== Professional career ==
Nivar was selected twenty-eighth overall by the Atlanta Dream in the 2026 WNBA draft. On April 17, 2026, she signed a rookie scale contract with the Dream. She was waived by the team on July 7. The next day, the Dream signed her to a player development contract.

== National team career ==
Nivar won gold with the United States at the 2022 FIBA Under-18 Women's Americas Championship, where she averaged 6.7 points, 3.7 rebounds, 2.3 assists, and 1.8 steals per game in six games.

== Career statistics ==
Legend
| GP | Games played | GS | Games started | MPG | Minutes per game | RPG | Rebounds per game |
| APG | Assists per game | SPG | Steals per game | BPG | Blocks per game | PPG | Points per game |
| TO | Turnovers per game | FG% | Field-goal percentage | 3P% | 3-point field-goal percentage | FT% | Free-throw percentage |
| **Bold** | Career best | ° | League leader |

=== WNBA ===
==== Regular season ====
WNBA regular season statistics
| Year | Team | GP | GS | MPG | FG% | 3P% | FT% | RPG | APG | SPG | BPG | TO | PPG |
|---|---|---|---|---|---|---|---|---|---|---|---|---|---|
| 2026 | Atlanta | 23 | 0 | 3.0 | .429 | .750 | .077 | .8 | .3 | .2 | .1 | .2 | 1.0 |
| **Career** | 1 year, 1 team | 23 | 0 | 3.0 | .429 | .750 | .077 | .8 | .3 | .2 | .1 | .2 | 1.0 |

=== College ===
| Year | Team | GP | GS | MPG | FG% | 3P% | FT% | RPG | APG | SPG | BPG | TO | PPG |
|---|---|---|---|---|---|---|---|---|---|---|---|---|---|
| 2022–23 | Stanford | **35** | 1 | 12.5 | .396 | .238 | **.656** | 2.0 | 1.0 | .5 | .1 | **1.0** | 3.2 |
| 2023–24 | North Carolina | 33 | 6 | 21.3 | .371 | .239 | .500 | 4.3 | 1.4 | 1.3 | **.5** | 1.7 | 6.4 |
| 2024–25 | North Carolina | 34 | 34 | 24.0 | .368 | .215 | .559 | 4.5 | 2.0 | 2.0 | .4 | 2.3 | 8.3 |
| 2025–26 | North Carolina | **35** | **35** | **28.7** | **.451** | **.313** | .600 | **5.2** | **3.7** | **2.7** | **.5** | 2.6 | **10.6** |
| **Career** | | 137 | 76 | 21.6 | .400 | .254 | .573 | 4.0 | 2.0 | 1.6 | .4 | 1.9 | 7.1 |
Statistics retrieved from Sports-Reference.
