= 2026 WNBA draft =

Basketball player selection

2026 WNBA Draft

General information
- Sport: Basketball
- Date: April 13, 2026
- Network: U.S.: ESPN

Overview
- 45 total selections in 3 rounds
- League: Women's National Basketball Association
- Teams: 15
- Expansion team: Portland Fire; Toronto Tempo
- First selection: Azzi Fudd (Dallas Wings)

The Women's National Basketball Association (WNBA)'s draft for the 2026 season was held following the 2025–26 NCAA Division I women's basketball season. This was the first draft for the league's two newest expansion teams, the Portland Fire and the Toronto Tempo.

== Draft lottery ==
In November 2025, the WNBA announced that the 2026 WNBA Draft Lottery would be held on November 23, 2025. The lottery decided the order of the first 5 picks in the 2026 WNBA draft and was televised on ESPN in the United States. The five teams that did not qualify for 2025 WNBA playoffs participated in this draft lottery.

=== Lottery chances ===
The lottery chances were based on the combined record from the 2024 and 2025 WNBA seasons. In the drawing, 14 balls numbered 1 to 14 were placed in a lottery machine and mixed. Four balls were drawn to determine a four-digit combination. The team assigned that four-ball combination received the No. 1 pick. The four balls were then be placed back into the machine and the process was repeated to determine the second pick. Of the three teams not selected in the drawings, the team with the worst cumulative two-year record was selected third; the team with the next worst record selected fourth; and the remaining team, fifth.

A representative from the league's independent accounting firm, Ernst & Young, was in attendance to oversee the draft lottery process.

Note: The team selected for the No. 1 pick in the lottery is noted below in bold text.

Team	Combined 2024–25 record	Lottery chances	Result
**Dallas Wings**	**19–65**	**42.0%**	**1st pick**
Minnesota Lynx (from Chicago Sky) (Note: April 13, 2025: Chicago to Minnesota: Minnesota acquired the 2026 first-round pick outright, and extinguished the previous right to exchange 2026 first-round draft picks with Chicago; Chicago acquired the 2025 No. 11 draft pick (Hailey Van Lith))	23–61	26.1%	2nd pick
Seattle Storm (from Los Angeles Sparks) (Note: January 31, 2024: Seattle to Los Angeles: Los Angeles acquired Kia Nurse and a 2024 first-round pick (Rickea Jackson); Seattle acquired a 2026 first-round pick)	29–55	16.7%	3rd pick
Washington Mystics	30–54	9.7%	4th pick
Chicago Sky (from Connecticut Sun) (Note: July 17, 2024: Connecticut to Chicago: Chicago acquired Rachel Banham, Moriah Jefferson, a 2025 first-round pick (Ajša Sivka), and the right to swap 2026 first-round picks; Connecticut acquired Marina Mabrey and a 2025 second-round pick (Rayah Marshall))	39–45	5.5%	5th pick

== Eligibility and entrants ==
Under the 2026 collective bargaining agreement (CBA) between the WNBA and its players' union, ratified before this draft and mostly unchanged from the previous CBA, draft eligibility for players (not defined as "international") requires the following to be true:

- The player's 22nd birthday falls during the calendar year of the draft. For the 2026 draft, the cutoff birth date is December 31, 2004.
- She has either:
  - completed her college eligibility;
  - received a bachelor's degree, or is scheduled to receive such in the three months following the draft; or
  - is at least four years removed from high school graduation.

=== Early eligibility ===
Players who are younger than the draft's cutoff age and are scheduled to receive their bachelor's degree within three months of the draft date will only be eligible if the calendar year of the draft is no earlier than the fourth year after their high school graduation.

Players with remaining college eligibility but who do meet the cutoff age criteria must notify WNBA headquarters of their intent to enter the draft no later than 10 days before the draft date, and must renounce any remaining college eligibility to do so. For the 2026 draft, the date fell on April 3. A separate notification timetable is provided for players involved in postseason tournaments (i.e. the NCAA Division I tournament); those players (normally) must declare for the draft within 24 hours of their final collegiate game.

=== International players ===
"International players" are defined as those for whom all of the following is true:

- Born and currently residing outside the U.S.
- Never "exercised intercollegiate basketball eligibility" in the U.S.
- The player's 20th birthday falls during the calendar year of the draft. For this draft, the international cutoff birth date is December 31, 2006.

== Draft ==
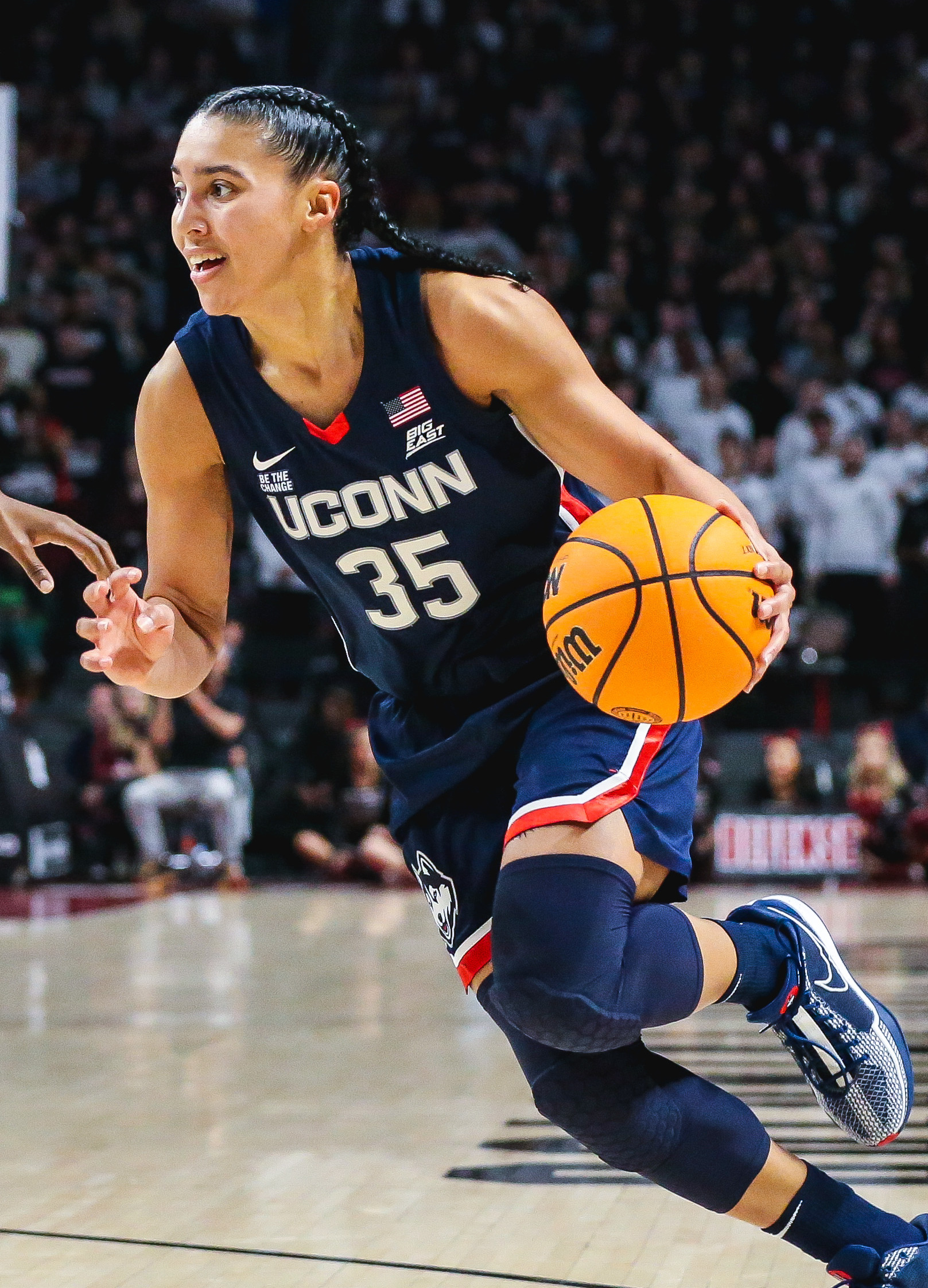
Azzi Fudd was selected 1st overall by the Dallas Wings.

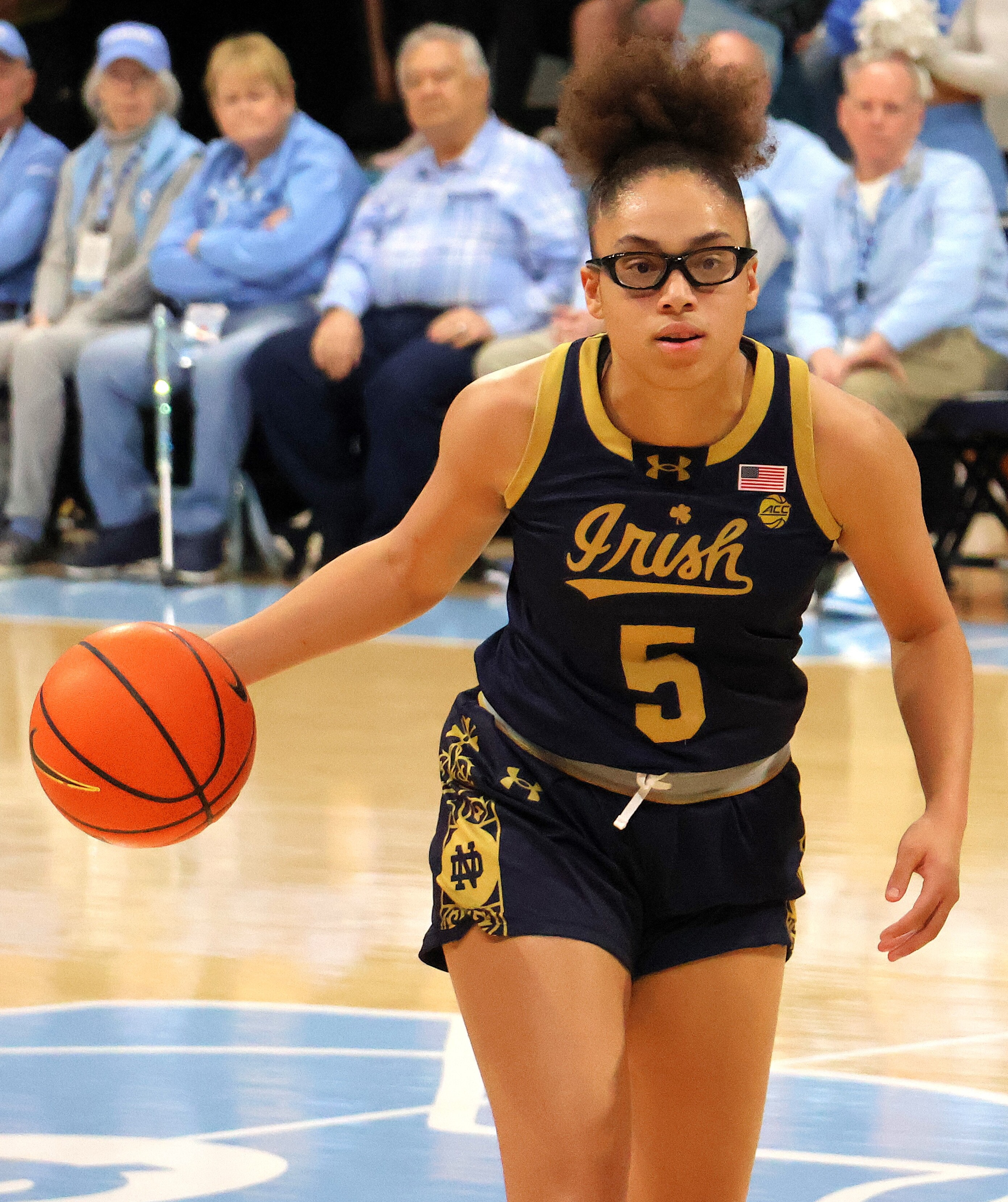
Olivia Miles was selected 2nd overall by the Minnesota Lynx.

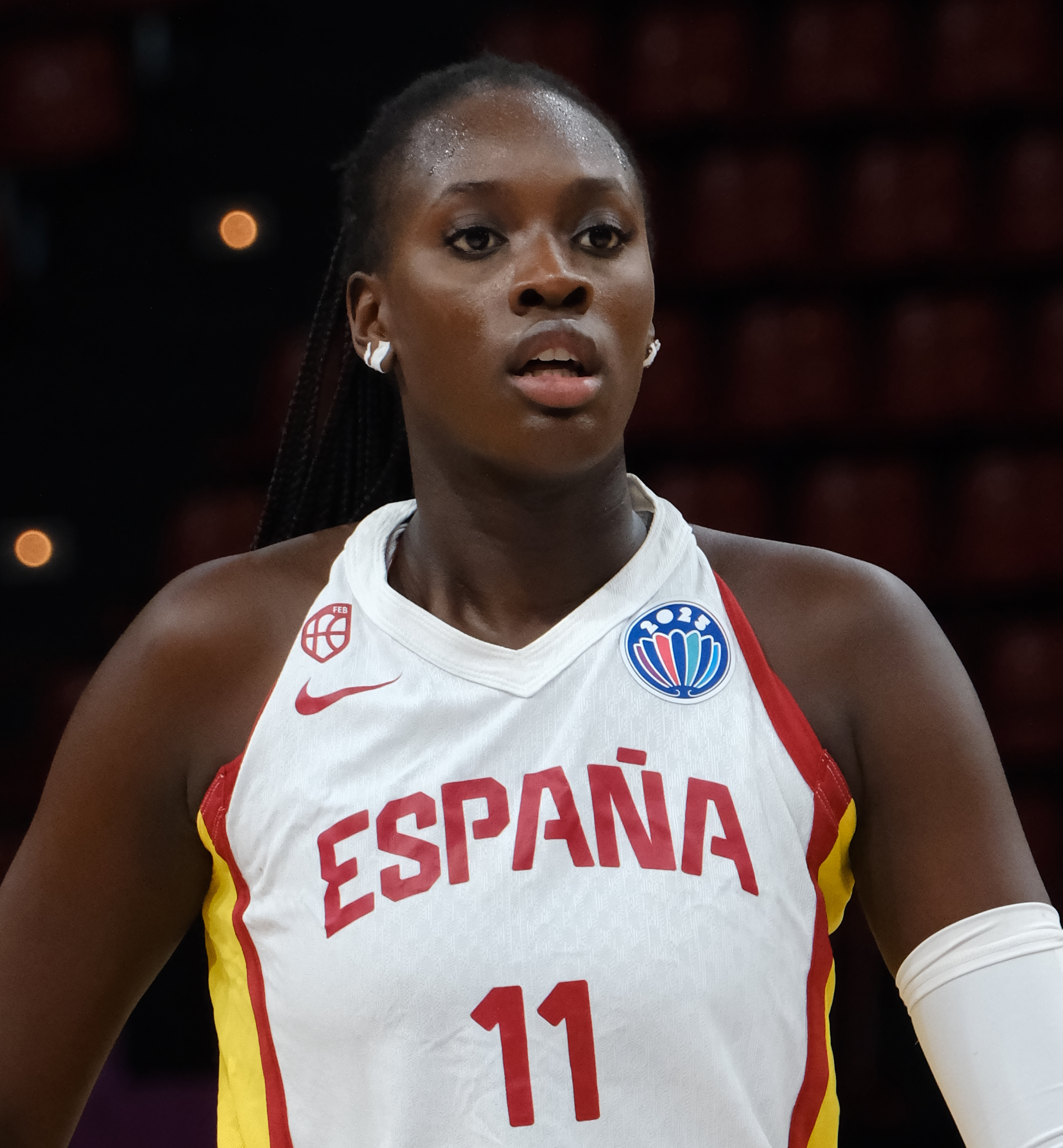
Awa Fam was selected 3rd overall by the Seattle Storm.

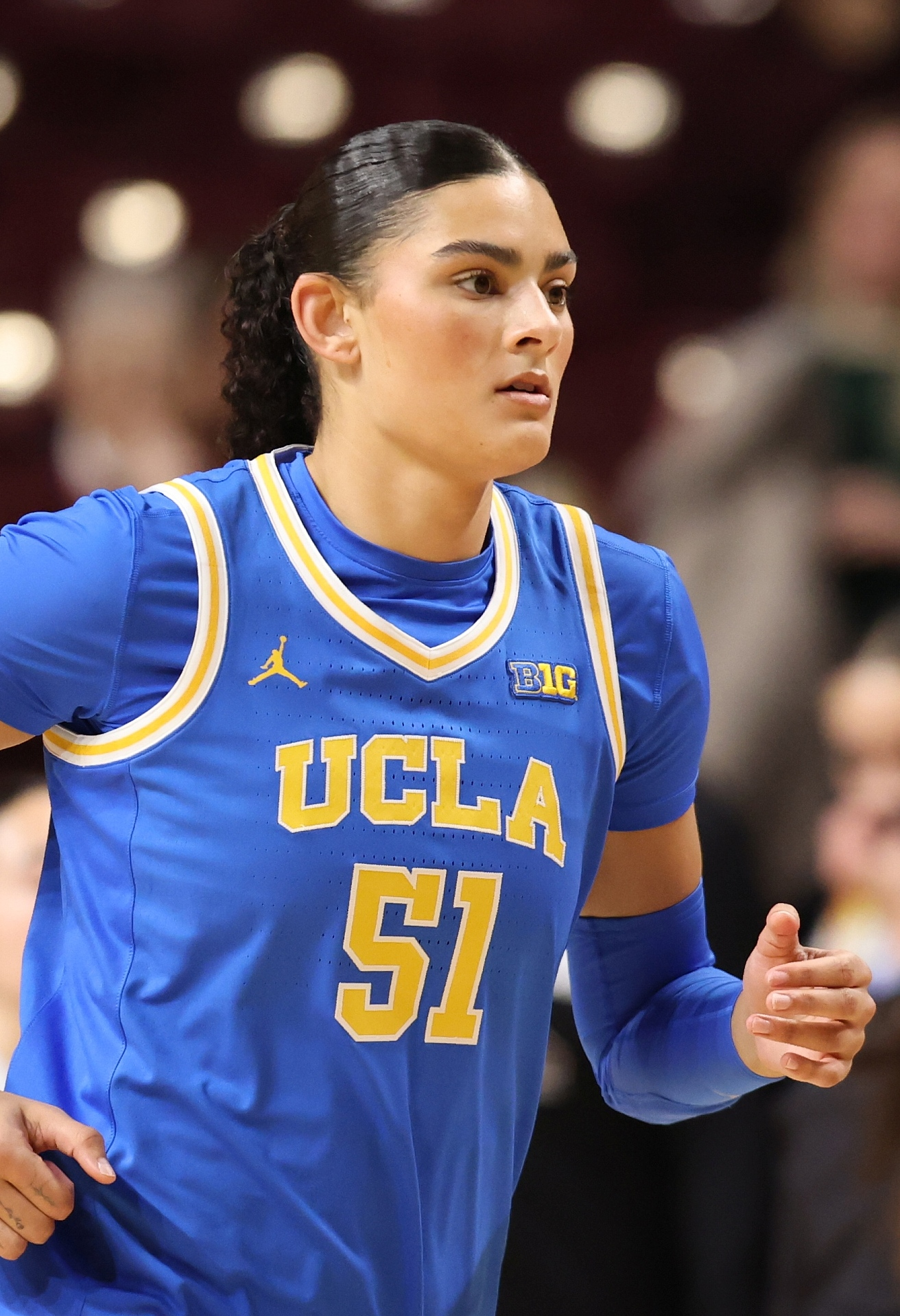
Lauren Betts was selected 4th overall by the Washington Mystics.

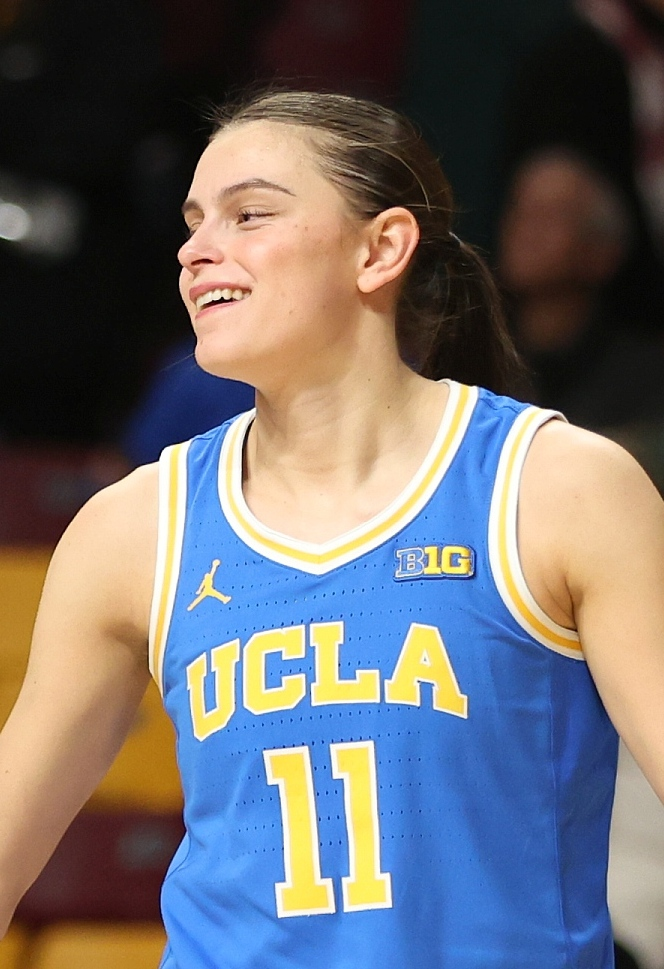
Gabriela Jaquez was selected 5th overall by the Chicago Sky.

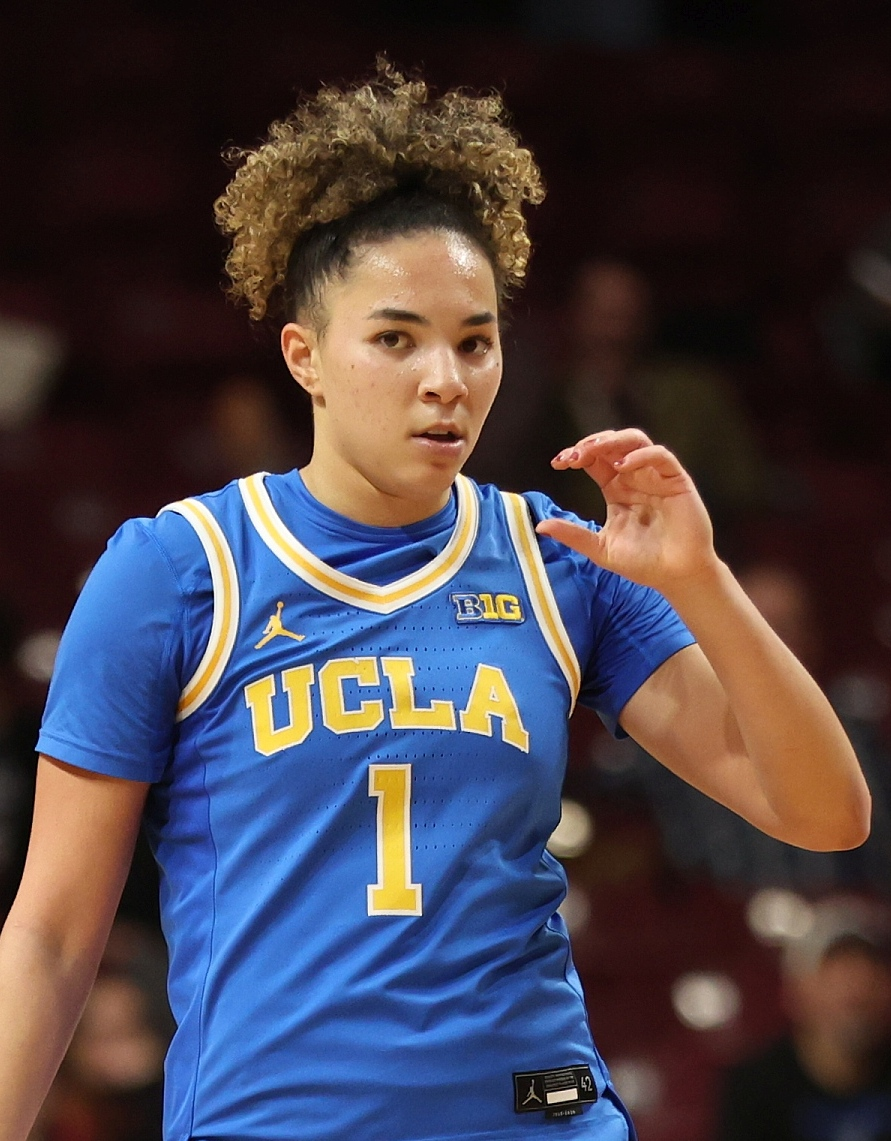
Kiki Rice was selected 6th overall by the Toronto Tempo.

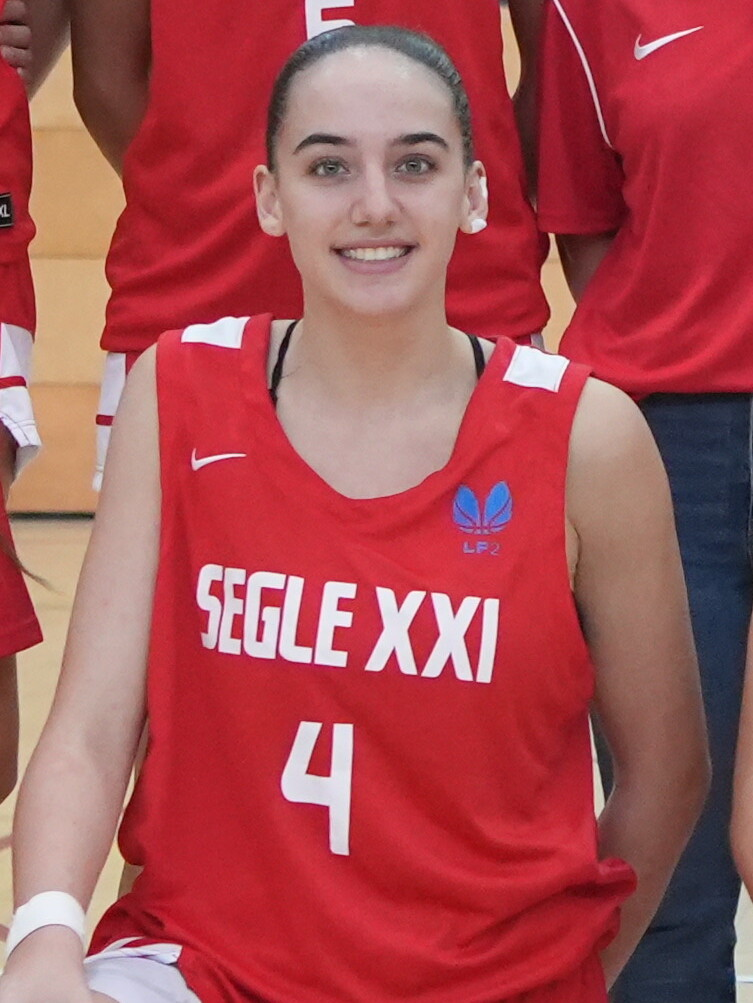
Iyana Martín was selected 7th overall by the Portland Fire.

*	Denotes player who has been selected for at least one All-Star Game and All-WNBA Team
^{#}	Denotes player who never played in the WNBA regular season or playoffs
**Bold**	Denotes player who won Rookie of the Year

=== First round ===
Pick	Player	Nationality	Team	School / club team
1	Azzi Fudd	United States	Dallas Wings	UConn
2	**Olivia Miles**^{*}	United States	Minnesota Lynx (from Chicago) (Note: April 13, 2025: Chicago to Minnesota: Minnesota acquired the outright 2026 first-round draft pick and extinguished the previous right to exchange 2026 first-round draft picks with Chicago; Chicago acquired the 2025 No. 11 draft pick (Hailey Van Lith))	TCU
3	Awa Fam	Spain/Senegal	Seattle Storm (from Los Angeles) (Note: January 31, 2024: Seattle to Los Angeles: Los Angeles acquired Kia Nurse and a 2024 first-round pick (Rickea Jackson); Seattle acquired a 2026 first-round pick)	Valencia (Spain)
4	Lauren Betts	United States	Washington Mystics	UCLA
5	Gabriela Jaquez	United States/Mexico	Chicago Sky (from Connecticut) (Note: July 17, 2024: Connecticut to Chicago: Chicago acquired Rachel Banham, Moriah Jefferson, a 2025 first-round pick (Ajša Sivka), and the right to swap 2026 first-round picks; Connecticut acquired Marina Mabrey and a 2025 second-round pick (Rayah Marshall))	UCLA
6	Kiki Rice	United States	Toronto Tempo	UCLA
7	Iyana Martín	Spain	Portland Fire	Perfumerias Avenida (Spain)
8	Flau'jae Johnson	United States	Golden State Valkyries (Traded to Seattle)	LSU
9	Angela Dugalić	United States/Serbia	Washington Mystics (from Seattle) (Note: August 5, 2025: Seattle to Washington: Seattle acquired Brittney Sykes; Washington acquired Alysha Clark, Zia Cooke, and a 2026 first-round pick)	UCLA
10	Raven Johnson	United States	Indiana Fever	South Carolina
11	Cotie McMahon	United States	Washington Mystics (from New York via Minnesota and Connecticut) (Note: March 16, 2025: New York to Connecticut: Connecticut acquired the 2025 No. 7 draft pick (Aneesah Morrow) and a 2026 first-round pick; New York acquired Natasha Cloud) (Note: April 14, 2025: Minnesota to Washington: Washington acquired 2026 first-round pick; Minnesota acquired Karlie Samuelson) (Note: August 7, 2025: Connecticut to Washington: Washington acquired Jacy Sheldon and the right to swap 2026 first-round picks (Washington with Minnesota's own and Connecticut with New York's own acquired from prior trades); Connecticut acquired Aaliyah Edwards)	Ole Miss
12	Nell Angloma	France	Connecticut Sun (from Phoenix via Chicago) (Note: February 6, 2024: Phoenix to Chicago: Phoenix acquired Kahleah Copper and Morgan Bertsch; Chicago acquired Brianna Turner, Michaela Onyenwere, a 2024 first-round pick (Kamilla Cardoso), the Sky's own 2025 second-round pick, a 2026 first-round pick, and the right to swap 2026 second-round picks with Phoenix)	Basket Lattes Montpellier (France)
13	Madina Okot	Kenya	Atlanta Dream	South Carolina
14	Taina Mair	United States	Seattle Storm (from Las Vegas) (Note: February 1, 2025: Three-team trade among Las Vegas, Los Angeles, and Seattle: Las Vegas acquired Jewell Loyd (from Seattle) and a 2025 second-round pick (Aaliyah Nye, from Los Angeles); Los Angeles acquired Kelsey Plum (from Las Vegas), a 2025 first-round (Sarah Ashlee Barker) and a 2026 second-round pick (from Seattle); Seattle acquired the rights to Li Yueru and a 2025 first-round pick (Dominique Malonga, from Los Angeles), and a 2026 first-round pick (from Las Vegas))	Duke
15	Gianna Kneepkens	United States	Connecticut Sun (from Minnesota via Washington)	UCLA

=== Second round ===
Pick	Player	Nationality	Team	School / club team
16	Marta Suárez	Spain	Seattle Storm (from Dallas, traded to Golden State) (Note: June 14, 2025: Dallas to Seattle: Dallas acquired Li Yueru; Seattle acquired a 2026 second-round pick (with right to swap with the Connecticut Sun) and a 2027 third-round pick (with right to swap with the Indiana Fever))	TCU
17	Frieda Bühner	Germany	Portland Fire (from Chicago) (Note: April 1, 2026: Chicago to Portland: Chicago acquired the 2026 21st pick and complete protection from the Fire in the 2026 WNBA expansion draft; Portland acquired the 2026 17th pick)	Estudiantes (Spain)
18	Charlisse Leger-Walker	New Zealand	Connecticut Sun	UCLA
19	Cassandre Prosper	Canada	Washington Mystics	Notre Dame
20	Ta'Niya Latson	United States	Los Angeles Sparks	South Carolina
21	Latasha Lattimore	Canada	Chicago Sky (from Portland)	Ole Miss
22	Teonni Key	United States	Toronto Tempo	Kentucky
23	Ashlon Jackson	United States	Golden State Valkyries	Duke
24	Chance Gray	United States	Los Angeles Sparks (from Seattle)	Ohio State
25	Justine Pissott	United States	Indiana Fever	Vanderbilt
26	Saffron Shiels	Australia	Toronto Tempo (from New York via Chicago) (Note: April 1, 2026: Chicago to Portland: Chicago acquired complete protection from the Tempo in the 2026 WNBA expansion draft; Tempo acquired the 2026 26th pick) (Note: March 14, 2024: New York to Chicago: New York acquired Rebekah Gardner; Chicago acquired 2025 and 2026 second-round picks)	Townsville Fire (Australia)
27	Inès Pitarch-Granel	France	Phoenix Mercury	Tango Bourges (France)
28	Indya Nivar	United States	Atlanta Dream	North Carolina
29	Janiah Barker	United States	Las Vegas Aces	Tennessee
30	Darianna Littlepage-Buggs	United States	Washington Mystics (from Minnesota) (Note: August 20, 2024: Minnesota to Washington: Minnesota acquired Myisha Hines-Allen; Washington acquired Olivia Époupa, Sika Koné, and a 2026 second-round pick)	Baylor

=== Third round ===
Pick	Player	Nationality	Team	School / club team
31	Zee Spearman	United States	Dallas Wings	Tennessee
32	Tonie Morgan	United States	Chicago Sky	Kentucky
33	Serah Williams	United States	Connecticut Sun	UConn
34	Rori Harmon	United States	Washington Mystics	Texas
35	Amelia Hassett	Australia	Los Angeles Sparks	Kentucky
36	Charlise Dunn	Australia	Toronto Tempo	Davidson
37	Taylor Bigby	United States	Portland Fire	TCU
38	Kokoro Tanaka	Japan	Golden State Valkyries	Eneos Sunflowers (Japan)
39	Grace VanSlooten	United States	Seattle Storm	Michigan State
40	Jessica Timmons	United States	Indiana Fever	Alabama
41	Manuela Puoch	Australia	New York Liberty	Southside Melbourne Flyers (Australia)
42	Eszter Rátkai	Hungary	Phoenix Mercury	PEAC (Hungary)
43	Ran Kejia	China	Atlanta Dream	Sichuan Yuanda (China)
44	Jordan Obi	United States	Las Vegas Aces	Kentucky
45	Lani White	United States	Minnesota Lynx	Utah

== Sponsorship ==
State Street Investment Management, promoting the SPDR S&P 500 ETF Trust (known by its ticker symbol "SPY"), was the presenting sponsor of the event, replacing previous presenting sponsor State Farm. State Street began a multi-year sponsorship of the league in September 2025.
