= NCAA Women's Basketball All-Americans =

The NCAA Women's Basketball All-American teams are teams made up of National Collegiate Athletic Association (NCAA) basketball players voted the best in the country by a variety of organizations.

== History ==
All-America teams in women's college basketball were first selected upon the conclusion of the 1974–75 season by the Women's Basketball Coaches Association (WBCA). Through the 1981–82 season no divisional classifications existed – players from all collegiate teams were eligible for the honor. In 1982–83 the NCAA divided the All-America teams into University Division (present day Division I) and College Division (present day Division II and III). Since 1983–84, all three NCAA Divisions have been recognized with their own All-America teams.

=== Voting bodies used to determine selections ===
Through the years, the following media outlets have been recognized and have been used to determine All-America teams.

Granting Institution	Years
Women's Basketball Coaches Association (WBCA)	1975–present
United States Basketball Writers Association (USBWA)	1988–present
Associated Press (AP)	1995–present
Naismith	1983–2002
Women's Basketball News Service (WBNS)	1999–2002
Sporting News	1998–1999, 2024–present

== See also ==
- NCAA Men's Basketball All-Americans – NCAA Division I men's basketball equivalent
