= 2024–25 Wisconsin Badgers women's basketball team =

American college basketball season

2024–25 Wisconsin Badgers women's basketball
- Conference: Big Ten Conference
- Record: 13–17 (4–14 Big Ten)
- Head coach: Marisa Moseley (4th season)
- Associate head coach: Margaret McKeon
- Assistant coaches: Jaime Gluesing; Frozena Jerro
- Home arena: Kohl Center

2024–25 Big Ten women's basketball standings
	Conf.				Overall
Team	W		L	PCT	W		L	PCT
No. 5 USC	17	–	1	.944	31	–	4	.886
No. 3 UCLA †	16	–	2	.889	34	–	3	.919
No. 19 Ohio State	13	–	5	.722	26	–	7	.788
No. 12 Maryland	13	–	5	.722	25	–	8	.758
No. 25 Michigan	11	–	7	.611	23	–	11	.676
Michigan State	11	–	7	.611	22	–	10	.688
Illinois	11	–	7	.611	22	–	10	.688
Oregon	10	–	8	.556	20	–	12	.625
Indiana	10	–	8	.556	20	–	13	.606
Nebraska	10	–	8	.556	21	–	12	.636
Iowa	10	–	8	.556	23	–	11	.676
Washington	9	–	9	.500	19	–	14	.576
Minnesota	8	–	10	.444	25	–	11	.694
Wisconsin	4	–	14	.222	13	–	17	.433
Rutgers	3	–	15	.167	13	–	20	.394
Purdue	3	–	15	.167	10	–	19	.345
Northwestern	2	–	16	.111	9	–	18	.333
Penn State	1	–	17	.056	10	–	19	.345
† 2025 Big Ten tournament winner As of April 7, 2025; Rankings from AP poll

The 2024–25 Wisconsin Badgers women's basketball team represented the University of Wisconsin–Madison in the 2024–25 NCAA Division I women's basketball season. The Badgers were led by fourth-year head coach Marisa Moseley and played their games at Kohl Center as members of the Big Ten Conference. They finished the season 13–16, 4–14 in Big Ten play to finish in 14th place. They lost to Iowa in the first round of the Big Ten tournament.

== Previous season ==
The Badgers finished the 2023–24 season 15–17, 6–12 in Big Ten play to finish in tenth place. As the No. 10 seed in the Big Ten tournament, they lost in the second round to Penn State. They received an at-large bid to the National Invitation Tournament, where they defeated Southern Indiana in the second round and Illinois State in the Super 16 before losing to Saint Louis in the Great 8.

== Offseason ==
=== Departures ===
Wisconsin departures
Name	Num	Pos.	Height	Year	Hometown	Reason for departure
Brooke Schramek	3	G	6'0"	Senior	Naperville, IL	Graduated
Ana Gullen	11	G	6'0"	Freshman	Badalona, Spain	Transferred to Yale
Sania Copeland	15	G	5'7"	Sophomore	Kansas City, KS	Transferred to Kansas
Sacia Vanderpool	20	F	6'4"	(redshirt) Sophomore	Byron, MN	Transferred to North Dakota State
Tessa Towers	22	C	6'5"	Freshman	Batavia, IL	Transferred to Ball State
Imbie Jones	31	F	6'2"	Freshman	Seattle, WA	Transferred to Nevada

=== Incoming transfers ===
Wisconsin incoming transfers
Name	Num	Pos.	Height	Year	Hometown	Previous school
Carter McCray	1	C	6'1"	Sophomore	Oberlin, OH	Northern Kentucky
Tess Myers	3	G	5'9"	Senior	Lower Burrell, PA	Duquesne

==== Recruiting ====
There was no recruiting class of 2024.

== Roster ==
2024–25 Wisconsin Badgers women's basketball team
Players
Coaches

Pos.	#	Name	Height	Year	Previous school	Hometown
C	1	Carter McCray	6 ft 1 in (1.85 m)	So	Elyria Catholic; Northern Kentucky	Oberlin, OH
F	2	Alie Bisballe	6 ft 4 in (1.93 m)	Fr	Lake City	Lake City, MI
G	3	Tess Myers	5 ft 9 in (1.75 m)	Sr	North Catholic; Duquesne	Lower Burrell, PA
G	4	Lily Krahn	5 ft 10 in (1.78 m)	Jr	Prairie du Chien	Prairie du Chien, WI
G	5	Leena Patibandla	6 ft 0 in (1.83 m)	So	Jackson	Canton, OH
G	9	Alba Martín Mesa	5 ft 6 in (1.68 m)	Fr	ÍES Pérez Galdós	Las Palmas de Gran Canaria, Spain
G	10	Halle Douglass	6 ft 1 in (1.85 m)	GS	Lake Forest	Lake Forest, IL
G/F	11	Jovana Spasovski	6 ft 0 in (1.83 m)	Fr	Gimnazija Patrijarh Pavle	Belgrade, Serbia
F	12	Tessa Grady	6 ft 2 in (1.88 m)	So	Dublin	Dublin, OH
G	13	Ronnie Porter	5 ft 4 in (1.63 m)	Jr	Como Park	St. Paul, MN
G	14	Reese Jaramillo	5 ft 8 in (1.73 m)	Fr	The Prairie School	Racine, WI
F	22	Gracie Grzesk	5 ft 11 in (1.8 m)	Fr	Notre Dame	Green Bay, WI
G	23	D'Yanis Jimenez	5 ft 8 in (1.73 m)	So	Charlotte	Cape Coral, FL
G	24	Natalie Leuzinger (W)	5 ft 8 in (1.73 m)	GS	Black Hawk High School	Monroe, WI
F	25	Serah Williams	6 ft 4 in (1.93 m)	Jr	Niagara Prep	Brooklyn, NY

Head coach

- Marisa Moseley (Boston University)

Assistant coach(es)

- Margaret McKeon (St. John's)
- Jaime Gluesing (Florida Gulf Coast)
- Frozena Jerro (Arizona State)

Legend

- (C) Team captain
- (S) Suspended
- (I) Ineligible
- (W) Walk-on
- Injured
- Current redshirt

Roster

== Schedule and results ==
Date time, TV	Rank^{#}	Opponent^{#}	Result	Record	High points	High rebounds	High assists	Site (attendance) city, state
Exhibition
October 29, 2024*; 6:30 p.m., B1G+		UW–Stevens Point	W 72–41		16 – Williams	9 – McCray	4 – Douglass	Kohl Center (2,953); Madison, WI
Regular season
November 5, 2024*; 6:30 p.m., B1G+		Wright State	W 95–68	1–0	29 – Williams	12 – Williams	3 – Tied	Kohl Center (2,850); Madison, WI
November 10, 2024*; 4:00 p.m., B1G+		Georgetown	W 79–61	2–0	26 – Porter	16 – Williams	4 – Tied	Kohl Center (3,452); Madison, WI
November 13, 2024*; 7:00 p.m., SLN		at South Dakota State	L 57–79	2–1	19 – Williams	9 – Williams	4 – Tied	First Bank and Trust Arena (3,167); Brookings, SD
November 17, 2024*; 2:00 p.m., B1G+		Milwaukee	W 82–45	3–1	15 – Tied	9 – Myers	6 – Porter	Kohl Center (3,410); Madison, WI
November 21, 2024*; 6:30 p.m., B1G+		UIC	W 61–57	4–1	20 – Williams	14 – Williams	5 – Porter	Kohl Center (2,728); Madison, WI
November 23, 2024*; 1:00 p.m., B1G+		Omaha	W 67–65	5–1	20 – Williams	14 – Williams	3 – Tied	Kohl Center (3,014); Madison, WI
November 28, 2024*; 1:00 p.m., FloHoops		vs. San Diego State; Cancún Challenge Mayan Division	L 67–73	5–2	19 – Williams	13 – McCray	5 – Porter	Hard Rock Hotel Riviera Maya (250); Cancún, Mexico
November 29, 2024*; 10:00 a.m., FloHoops		vs. Providence; Cancún Challenge Mayan Division	W 66–57	6–2	19 – McCray	15 – Williams	6 – Porter	Hard Rock Hotel Riviera Maya (214); Cancún, Mexico
November 30, 2024*; 12:30 p.m., FloHoops		vs. VCU; Cancún Challenge Mayan Division	W 58–45	7–2	19 – McCray	9 – Williams	5 – Porter	Hard Rock Hotel Riviera Maya (121); Cancún, Mexico
December 8, 2024; 2:00 p.m., B1G+		Rutgers	W 66–64	8–2 (1–0)	20 – Williams	13 – Williams	7 – Porter	Kohl Center (3,266); Madison, WI
December 11, 2024*; 6:00 p.m., FloHoops		at Butler	W 71–64 ^{2OT}	9–2	36 – Williams	14 – Williams	4 – Douglass	Hinkle Fieldhouse (1,030); Indianapolis, IN
December 20, 2024*; 11:00 a.m., B1G+		Albany	W 69–59	10–2	28 – Williams	14 – McCray	6 – Porter	Kohl Center (5,820); Madison, WI
December 28, 2024; 1:00 p.m., BTN		at Indiana	L 52–83	10–3 (1–1)	13 – Williams	11 – Williams	6 – Porter	Simon Skjodt Assembly Hall (11,212); Bloomington, IN
December 31, 2024; 2:00 p.m., B1G+		Minnesota	L 50–59	10–4 (1–2)	16 – Williams	11 – Williams	6 – Porter	Kohl Center (4,480); Madison, WI
January 4, 2025; 2:30 p.m., BTN		at Oregon	L 52–68	10–5 (1–3)	12 – Leuzinger	8 – Williams	6 – Porter	Matthew Knight Arena (5,847); Eugene, OR
January 7, 2025; 8:00 p.m., BTN		at Washington	L 58–79	10–6 (1–4)	19 – Williams	9 – Williams	3 – Krahn	Alaska Airlines Arena (2,700); Seattle, WA
January 11, 2025; 1:30 p.m., BTN		No. 8 Maryland	L 68–83	10–7 (1–5)	24 – Williams	6 – McCray	8 – Douglass	Kohl Center (4,115); Madison, WI
January 16, 2025; 8:00 p.m., Peacock		No. 9 Ohio State	L 69–80	10–8 (1–6)	20 – Williams	17 – Williams	6 – Williams	Kohl Center (2,820); Madison, WI
January 20, 2025; 7:00 p.m., BTN		at Nebraska	L 60–91	10–9 (1–7)	20 – Williams	8 – Williams	6 – Porter	Pinnacle Bank Arena (4,571); Lincoln, NE
January 26, 2025; 2:00 p.m., B1G+		at No. 23 Minnesota	L 50–71	10–10 (1–8)	16 – Williams	6 – Williams	7 – Porter	Williams Arena (7,554); Minneapolis, MN
January 29, 2025; 6:30 p.m., B1G+		Michigan	W 82–75	11–10 (2–8)	22 – Williams	9 – McCray	8 – Porter	Kohl Center (4,023); Madison, WI
February 2, 2025; 1:00 p.m., B1G+		at Purdue	L 71–84	11–11 (2–9)	28 – Williams	9 – McCray	5 – Porter	Mackey Arena (5,012); West Lafayette, IN
February 5, 2025; 6:30 p.m., Peacock		No. 7 USC	L 64–86	11–12 (2–10)	19 – Williams	11 – McCray	4 – Porter	Kohl Center (6,285); Madison, WI
February 9, 2025; 3:00 p.m., B1G+		Illinois	L 51–74	11–13 (2–11)	14 – Williams	5 – Tied	2 – Jimenez	Kohl Center (4,547); Madison, WI
February 12, 2025; 5:30 p.m., B1G+		at No. 22 Michigan State	L 71–91	11–14 (2–12)	23 – Williams	12 – Williams	7 – Porter	Breslin Center (2,275); East Lansing, MI
February 16, 2025; 12:00 p.m., B1G+		at Penn State	W 75–68	12–14 (3–12)	23 – Williams	10 – Williams	12 – Porter	Bryce Jordan Center (4,188); State College, PA
February 23, 2025; 2:00 p.m., B1G+		Northwestern	W 73–68	13–14 (4–12)	22 – McCray	11 – McCray	8 – Porter	Kohl Center (4,390); Madison, WI
February 26, 2025; 7:00 p.m., Peacock		No. 2 UCLA	L 61–91	13–15 (4–13)	22 – Williams	9 – McCray	3 – Tied	Kohl Center (3,897); Madison, WI
March 2, 2025; 3:00 p.m., Peacock		at Iowa	L 66–81	13–16 (4–14)	18 – Williams	10 – Tied	3 – Tied	Carver–Hawkeye Arena (14,998); Iowa City, IA
Big Ten Women's Tournament
March 5, 2025; 8:30 p.m., Peacock	(14)	vs. (11) Iowa; First Round	L 54–81	13–17	22 – Williams	5 – Williams	6 – Porter	Gainbridge Fieldhouse; Indianapolis, IN
*Non-conference game. ^{#}Rankings from AP Poll. (#) Tournament seedings in parentheses. All times are in Central.

== See also ==
- 2024–25 Wisconsin Badgers men's basketball team
