= 2024–25 Purdue Boilermakers women's basketball team =

Intercollegiate basketball season

2024–25 Purdue Boilermakers women's basketball
- Conference: Big Ten Conference
- Record: 10–19 (3–15 Big Ten)
- Head coach: Katie Gearlds (4th season)
- Associate head coach: Kelly Komara
- Assistant coaches: Michael Stephens; Alex Guyton
- Home arena: Mackey Arena

2024–25 Big Ten women's basketball standings
	Conf.				Overall
Team	W		L	PCT	W		L	PCT
No. 5 USC	17	–	1	.944	31	–	4	.886
No. 3 UCLA †	16	–	2	.889	34	–	3	.919
No. 19 Ohio State	13	–	5	.722	26	–	7	.788
No. 12 Maryland	13	–	5	.722	25	–	8	.758
No. 25 Michigan	11	–	7	.611	23	–	11	.676
Michigan State	11	–	7	.611	22	–	10	.688
Illinois	11	–	7	.611	22	–	10	.688
Oregon	10	–	8	.556	20	–	12	.625
Indiana	10	–	8	.556	20	–	13	.606
Nebraska	10	–	8	.556	21	–	12	.636
Iowa	10	–	8	.556	23	–	11	.676
Washington	9	–	9	.500	19	–	14	.576
Minnesota	8	–	10	.444	25	–	11	.694
Wisconsin	4	–	14	.222	13	–	17	.433
Rutgers	3	–	15	.167	13	–	20	.394
Purdue	3	–	15	.167	10	–	19	.345
Northwestern	2	–	16	.111	9	–	18	.333
Penn State	1	–	17	.056	10	–	19	.345
† 2025 Big Ten tournament winner As of April 7, 2025; Rankings from AP poll

The 2024–25 Purdue Boilermakers women's basketball team represented Purdue University during the 2024–25 NCAA Division I women's basketball season. The Boilermakers were led by fourth-year head coach Katie Gearlds and played their home games at Mackey Arena where they were a member of the Big Ten Conference. They finished the season 10–19, 3–15 in Big Ten play to finish in a tie for 15th place. Due to a tiebreaking rules, they failed to qualify for the Big Ten women's tournament.

== Previous season ==
The Boilermakers finished the 2023–24 season 15–19, 5–13 in Big Ten play to finish in a tie for eleventh place. As the No. 12 seed in the Big Ten tournament, they defeated Northwestern in the first round before losing in the seco7 nd round to Nebraska. They received an at-large bid to the WNIT where they defeated Butler in the second round and Duquesne in the super 16 before losing to Vermont in the great 8.

== Offseason ==
=== Departures ===
Purdue Departures
Name	Num	Pos.	Height	Year	Hometown	Reason for Departure
Jeanae Terry	10	G	5'11"	Senior	Detroit, MI	Graduated
Mary Ashley Stevenson	20	F	6'2"	Freshman	New York, NY	Transferred to Stanford
Emily Monson	21	G	6'1"	Freshman	Murfreesboro, TN	Transferred to Middle Tennessee
Abbey Ellis	23	G	5'6"	Senior	Melbourne, Australia	Graduated
Madison Layden	33	G	6'1"	Senior	Kokomo, IN	Graduated
Caitlyn Harper	34	F	6'3"	Senior	Hartland, WI	Graduated

=== Incoming transfers ===
Purdue incoming transfers
Name	Num	Pos.	Height	Year	Hometown	Previous School
Destini Lombard	4	G	5'9"	Graduate student	New Iberia, LA	Stephen F. Austin
Mahri Petree	7	G	6'0"	Graduate student	Detroit, MI	UTEP
Ella Collier	13	G	6'0"	Graduate student	Danville, IN	Marian
Reagan Bass	34	F	6'1"	Junior	Strongville, OH	Akron

=== 2024 recruiting class ===
College recruiting information
Name	Hometown	School	Height	Weight	Commit date
Jordyn Poole; PG	North Vernon, IN	R. Nelson Snider High School	5 ft 7 in (1.70 m)	N/A	
Jordyn Poole; PG	Recruit ratings: ESPN: (94)				
Overall recruit ranking:
Note: In many cases, Scout, Rivals, 247Sports, On3, and ESPN may conflict in their listings of height and weight.; In these cases, the average was taken. ESPN grades are on a 100-point scale.; Sources: "2024 Player Commits". ESPN. Archived from the original on November 8, 2024.

==== 2025 recruiting class ====
College recruiting information (2025)
Name	Hometown	School	Height	Weight	Commit date
Avery Gordon; P	Brownsburg, IN	Brownsburg High School	6 ft 5 in (1.96 m)	N/A	
Avery Gordon; P	Recruit ratings: ESPN: (93)				
Kira Reynolds; F	Washington, IN	Washington High School	6 ft 3 in (1.91 m)	N/A	
Kira Reynolds; F	Recruit ratings: ESPN: (91)				
Overall recruit ranking:
Note: In many cases, Scout, Rivals, 247Sports, On3, and ESPN may conflict in their listings of height and weight.; In these cases, the average was taken. ESPN grades are on a 100-point scale.; Sources: "2025 Player Commits". ESPN. Archived from the original on November 8, 2024.

== Roster ==
2024–25 Purdue Boilermakers women's basketball team
Players
Coaches

Pos.	#	Name	Height	Year	Previous school	Hometown
G	1	Amiyah Reynolds	6 ft 0 in (1.83 m)	So	South Bend Washington High School	South Bend, Indiana
G	2	Rashunda Jones	5 ft 8 in (1.73 m)	So	South Bend Washington High School	South Bend, Indiana
G	3	Jayla Smith	6 ft 0 in (1.83 m)	Sr	Lawrence North High School	Indianapolis, Indiana
G	4	Destini Lombard	5 ft 9 in (1.75 m)	GS	Stephen F. Austin	New Iberia, Louisiana
G	7	Mahri Petree	6 ft 0 in (1.83 m)	GS	UTEP	Detroit, Michigan
G	10	Jordyn Poole	5 ft 7 in (1.7 m)	Fr	Fort Wayne Snider High School	Fort Wayne, Indiana
G	11	McKenna Layden	6 ft 2 in (1.88 m)	So	Northwestern High School	Kokomo, Indiana
F	15	Mila Reynolds	6 ft 3 in (1.91 m)	Jr	Maryland	South Bend, Indiana
F	22	Kendall Puryear	6 ft 3 in (1.91 m)	Fr	Blue Springs South High School	Lee's Summit, Missouri
G	31	Sophie Swanson	5 ft 10 in (1.78 m)	So	Barrington Prep	Barrington, Illinois
F	32	Alaina Harper	6 ft 3 in (1.91 m)	Jr	Grand Canyon	Hartland, Wisconsin
F	34	Reagan Bass	6 ft 1 in (1.85 m)	Sr	Akron	Strongsville, Ohio
F	35	Lana McCarthy	6 ft 4 in (1.93 m)	Fr	Bedford High School	Bedford, New Hampshire

Head coach

- Katie Gearlds (Purdue)

Assistant coach(es)

- Kelly Komara (Purdue)
- Mark Stephens (Morehead State)
- Alex Guyton (Purdue)

Legend

- (C) Team captain
- (S) Suspended
- (I) Ineligible
- (W) Walk-on
- Injured
- Current redshirt

Roster

== Schedule and results ==
Date time, TV	Rank^{#}	Opponent^{#}	Result	Record	High points	High rebounds	High assists	Site (attendance) city, state
Exhibition
October 29, 2024*; 7:00 p.m., B1G+		Indiana Tech	W 101–50		–	–	–	Mackey Arena; West Lafayette, IN
Regular season
November 6, 2024*; 7:00 p.m., B1G+		Purdue Fort Wayne	W 87–77	1–0	20 – Lombard	10 – McCarthy	5 – Lombard	Mackey Arena (3,531); West Lafayette, IN
November 10, 2024*; 7:00 p.m., FS1		No. 6 Notre Dame	L 58–102	1–1	13 – Lombard	5 – Lombard	3 – Swanson	Mackey Arena (5,854); West Lafayette, IN
November 14, 2024*; 7:30 p.m., B1G+		IU Indy	W 83–64	2–1	22 – Bass	9 – Bass	4 – Lombard	Mackey Arena (3,432); West Lafayette, IN
November 18, 2024*; 7:00 p.m., B1G+		Bellarmine	W 78–67	3–1	21 – Bass	11 – Bass	6 – Collier	Mackey Arena (3,415); West Lafayette, IN
November 24, 2024*; 1:00 p.m., B1G+		UT Arlington	W 73–55	4–1	18 – McCarthy	13 – Lombard	5 – Swanson	Mackey Arena (4,712); West Lafayette, IN
November 28, 2024*; 4:30 p.m., WSN		vs. Middle Tennessee; Fort Myers Tip-Off Island Division	L 49–54	4–2	19 – Boldyreva	10 – Boldyreva	5 – Blakely	Suncoast Credit Union Arena (1,896); Fort Myers, FL
November 30, 2024*; 11:00 a.m., WSN		vs. No. 4 South Carolina; Fort Myers Tip-Off Island Division	L 51–99	4–3	24 – Lombard	5 – Puryear	3 – Tied	Suncoast Credit Union Arena (1,913); Fort Myers, FL
December 4, 2024*; 7:00 p.m., B1G+		Maine	W 60–51	5–3	20 – Bass	13 – Lombard	3 – Swanson	Mackey Arena (3,413); West Lafayette, IN
December 7, 2024; 2:00 p.m., B1G+		No. 7 Maryland	L 69–78	5–4 (0–1)	16 – Bass	7 – McCarthy	3 – Lombard	Mackey Arena (6,203); West Lafayette, IN
December 14, 2024*; 5:00 p.m., BTN		No. 16 Kentucky	L 52–82	5–5	12 – McCarthy	7 – McCarthy	5 – Jones	Mackey Arena (5,108); West Lafayette, IN
December 17, 2024*; 7:00 p.m., ESPN+		at Miami (OH)	W 67–51	6–5	16 – Lombard	10 – Bass	5 – Tied	Millett Hall (639); Oxford, OH
December 21, 2024; 2:00 p.m., B1G+		Indiana State	W 87–68	7–5	15 – Bass	10 – Bass	6 – A. Reynolds	Mackey Arena (3,803); West Lafayette, IN
December 29, 2024; 3:00 p.m., B1G+		at No. 24 Iowa	L 63–84	7–6 (0–2)	12 – Lombard	5 – McCarthy	4 – Lombard	Carver–Hawkeye Arena (14,998); Iowa City, IA
January 1, 2025; 2:00 p.m., B1G+		at No. 21 Michigan State	L 59–77	7–7 (0–3)	10 – Tied	6 – Tied	3 – Tied	Breslin Center (5,324); East Lansing, MI
January 7, 2025; 7:00 p.m., BTN		No. 1 UCLA	L 49–83	7–8 (0–4)	16 – Lombard	4 – Tied	7 – Jones	Mackey Arena (3,742); West Lafayette, IN
January 11, 2025; 2:00 p.m., B1G+		No. 25 Michigan	L 60–87	7–9 (0–5)	11 – Jones	5 – Layden	3 – Jones	Mackey Arena (9,231); West Lafayette, IN
January 15, 2025; 9:00 p.m., B1G+		at Oregon	L 53–69	7–10 (0–6)	17 – Jones	9 – Layden	4 – Jones	Matthew Knight Arena (4,944); Eugene, OR
January 18, 2025; 5:00 p.m., BTN		at Washington	L 58–87	7–11 (0–7)	17 – Lombard	7 – Layden	3 – Poole	Alaska Airlines Arena (10,010); Seattle, WA
January 22, 2025; 7:00 p.m., Peacock		No. 4 USC	L 37–79	7–12 (0–8)	10 – Puryear	7 – Layden	3 – Layden	Mackey Arena (7,543); West Lafayette, IN
January 27, 2025; 8:30 p.m., BTN		at Illinois	L 38–74	7–13 (0–9)	10 – Puryear	6 – Mooarthy	5 – Jones	State Farm Center (4,081); Champaign, IL
January 30, 2025; 7:00 p.m., B1G+		Nebraska	L 68–74	7–14 (0–10)	20 – Jones	6 – Layden	4 – Tied	Mackey Arena (6,315); West Lafayette, IN
February 2, 2025; 2:00 p.m., B1G+		Wisconsin	W 84–71	8–14 (1–10)	18 – Puryear	9 – Layden	5 – Jones	Mackey Arena (5,012); West Lafayette, IN
February 9, 2025; 1:00 p.m., B1G+		at Rutgers	L 69–78	8–15 (1–11)	17 – Swanson	8 – Bass	5 – Jones	Jersey Mike's Arena (3,882); Piscataway, NJ
February 12, 2025; 7:00 p.m., B1G+		Northwestern	W 75–60	9–15 (2–11)	14 – Tied	5 – Tied	7 – Jones	Mackey Arena (4,002); West Lafayette, IN
February 15, 2025; 12:00 p.m., BTN		Indiana; Rivalry	L 56–78	9–16 (2–12)	15 – Puryear	10 – Layden	2 – Tied	Simon Skjodt Assembly Hall (12,008); Bloomington, IN
February 19, 2025; 7:00 p.m., B1G+		Minnesota	L 61–74	9–17 (2–13)	18 – Swanson	6 – Jones	9 – Jones	Mackey Arena (3,814); West Lafayette, IN
February 23, 2025; 12:00 p.m., BTN		at No. 8 Ohio State	L 46–98	9–18 (2–14)	11 – Jones	10 – Bass	3 – Lombard	Value City Arena (8,567); Columbus, OH
February 27, 2025; 6:00 p.m., BTN		at Penn State	W 92–85	10–18 (3–15)	32 – Jones	8 – McCarthy	8 – Jones	Bryce Jordan Center (2,407); State College, PA
March 2, 2025; 2:00 p.m., Peacock		Indiana; Rivalry	L 57–77	10–19 (3–15)	15 – McCarthy	7 – McCarthy	4 – Jones	Mackey Arena (10,512); West Lafayette, IN
*Non-conference game. ^{#}Rankings from AP Poll. (#) Tournament seedings in parentheses. All times are in Eastern Time.
