= 2024–25 Indiana Hoosiers women's basketball team =

American college basketball season

2024–25 Indiana Hoosiers women's basketball

NCAA tournament, Second round
- Conference: Big Ten Conference
- Record: 20–13 (10–8 Big Ten)
- Head coach: Teri Moren (11th season)
- Assistant coaches: Rhet Wierzba; Linda Sayavongchanh; Ali Patberg
- Home arena: Simon Skjodt Assembly Hall

2024–25 Big Ten women's basketball standings
	Conf.				Overall
Team	W		L	PCT	W		L	PCT
No. 5 USC	17	–	1	.944	31	–	4	.886
No. 3 UCLA †	16	–	2	.889	34	–	3	.919
No. 19 Ohio State	13	–	5	.722	26	–	7	.788
No. 12 Maryland	13	–	5	.722	25	–	8	.758
No. 25 Michigan	11	–	7	.611	23	–	11	.676
Michigan State	11	–	7	.611	22	–	10	.688
Illinois	11	–	7	.611	22	–	10	.688
Oregon	10	–	8	.556	20	–	12	.625
Indiana	10	–	8	.556	20	–	13	.606
Nebraska	10	–	8	.556	21	–	12	.636
Iowa	10	–	8	.556	23	–	11	.676
Washington	9	–	9	.500	19	–	14	.576
Minnesota	8	–	10	.444	25	–	11	.694
Wisconsin	4	–	14	.222	13	–	17	.433
Rutgers	3	–	15	.167	13	–	20	.394
Purdue	3	–	15	.167	10	–	19	.345
Northwestern	2	–	16	.111	9	–	18	.333
Penn State	1	–	17	.056	10	–	19	.345
† 2025 Big Ten tournament winner As of April 7, 2025; Rankings from AP poll

The 2024–25 Indiana Hoosiers women's basketball team represented the Indiana University Bloomington during the 2024–25 NCAA Division I women's basketball season. The Hoosiers were led by head coach Teri Moren in her 11th season, and played their home games at the Simon Skjodt Assembly Hall as a member of the Big Ten Conference.

== Previous season ==
The Hoosiers finished the 2022–23 season with a 26–6 record, including 15–3 in Big Ten play to finish tied for second place in the conference. They received an at-large bid to the 2024 NCAA Division I Women's Basketball Tournament, where they advanced to the sweet sixteen.

== Offseason ==
On May 1, 2024, Ali Patberg was named assistant coach, and Keyanna Warthen was named team recruitment coordinator and assistant coach.

=== Departures ===
Indiana departures
Name	Number	Pos.	Height	Year	Hometown	Reason for Departure
Sara Scalia	14	G	5'10"	Graduate student	Stillwater, Minnesota	Graduated
Arielle Wisne	25	C	6'5"	Senior	Thornton, Colorado	Graduated
Mackenzie Holmes	54	G	6'3"	Graduate student	Gorham, Maine	2024 WNBA draft, drafted 26th overall by the Seattle Storm

=== Incoming transfers ===
Indiana transfers
Name	Pos.	Height	Year	Hometown	Previous school
Shay Ciezki	G	5'7"	Junior	Buffalo, New York	Penn State
Karoline Striplin	F	6'3"	Senior	Hartford, Alabama	Tennessee

== Roster ==
2024–25 Indiana Hoosiers women's basketball team
Players
Coaches

Pos.	#	Name	Height	Year	Previous school	Hometown
G	1	Lexus Bargesser	5 ft 9 in (1.75 m)	Jr	Grass Lake	Grass Lake, MI
G	5	Lenée Beaumont	6 ft 1 in (1.85 m)	So	Benet Academy	Lisle, IL
G	10	Shay Ciezki	5 ft 7 in (1.7 m)	Jr	St. Mary's; Penn State	Buffalo, NY
F	11	Karolina Striplin	6 ft 3 in (1.91 m)	Sr	Geneva County; Tennessee	Hartford, AL
G	12	Yarden Garzon	6 ft 3 in (1.91 m)	Jr	Ostrovsky	Ra'anana, Israel
G	15	Valentyna Kadlecova	6 ft 0 in (1.83 m)	Fr	DSK Levharti Chomutov	Kadaň, Czech Republic
G	20	Julianna LaMendola	6 ft 1 in (1.85 m)	So	Coppell	Coppell, TX
G	21	Henna Sandvik	6 ft 0 in (1.83 m)	Jr	Mäkelänrinne	Helsinki, Finland
G	22	Chloe Moore-McNeil	5 ft 11 in (1.8 m)	GS	Greenfield	Greenfield, TN
F	23	Sharnecce Currie-Jelks	6 ft 2 in (1.88 m)	Jr	South Side; UT Martin	Jackson, TN
F	24	Sydney Fenn	6 ft 3 in (1.91 m)	Fr	AZ Compass Prep	Buffalo, NY
F	31	Faith Wiseman	6 ft 4 in (1.93 m)	Fr	Indian Creek	Martinsville, IN
G	33	Sydney Parrish	6 ft 2 in (1.88 m)	GS	Hamilton Southeastern; Oregon	Fishers, IN
F	52	Lilly Meister	6 ft 3 in (1.91 m)	Jr	John Marshall	Rochester, MN

Head coach

- Teri Moren (Purdue)

Assistant coach(es)

- Rhet Wierzba (Austin Peay)
- Linda Sayavongchanh (Drake)
- Ali Patberg (Indiana)

Legend

- (C) Team captain
- (S) Suspended
- (I) Ineligible
- (W) Walk-on
- Injured
- Current redshirt

Roster
Last update: October 1, 2024

== Schedule and results ==
Date time, TV	Rank^{#}	Opponent^{#}	Result	Record	Site (attendance) city, state
Exhibition
October 30, 2024*; 7:00 p.m., B1G+	No. 25	Maryville	W 95–27	—	Simon Skjodt Assembly Hall (9,794); Bloomington, IN
Regular Season
November 4, 2024*; 7:00 p.m., B1G+	No. 25	Brown	W 82–60	1–0	Simon Skjodt Assembly Hall (10,050); Bloomington, IN
November 7, 2024*; 7:00 p.m., B1G+	No. 25	Harvard	L 68–72 ^{OT}	1–1	Simon Skjodt Assembly Hall (10,287); Bloomington, IN
November 13, 2024*; 7:00 p.m., FloHoops		at Butler	L 46–56	1–2	Hinkle Fieldhouse (4,135); Indianapolis, IN
November 17, 2024*; 2:00 p.m., FS1		No. 24 Stanford	W 79–66	2–2	Simon Skjodt Assembly Hall (10,351); Bloomington, IN
November 23, 2024*; 4:00 p.m., FloHoops		vs. Columbia; Battle 4 Atlantis quarterfinals	W 72–62	3–2	Imperial Arena (299); Paradise Island, Bahamas
November 24, 2024*; 1:30 p.m., FloHoops		vs. No. 18 Baylor; Battle 4 Atlantis semifinals	W 73–65	4–2	Imperial Arena (179); Paradise Island, Bahamas
November 25, 2024*; 12:00 p.m., ESPN2		vs. No. 16 North Carolina; Battle 4 Atlantis championship	L 39–69	4–3	Imperial Arena (437); Paradise Island, Bahamas
December 1, 2024*; 2:00 p.m., B1G+		Maine	W 78–53	5–3	Simon Skjodt Assembly Hall (10,477); Bloomington, IN
December 4, 2024*; 7:00 p.m., B1G+		Southern Indiana	W 67–63	6–3	Simon Skjodt Assembly Hall (10,322); Bloomington, IN
December 7, 2024; 1:00 p.m., B1G+		at Penn State	W 75–60	7–3 (1–0)	Bryce Jordan Center (2,055); State College, PA
December 15, 2024*; 7:00 p.m., B1G+		Bellarmine	W 95–61	8–3	Simon Skjodt Assembly Hall (10,220); Bloomington, IN
December 22, 2024*; 12:00 p.m., B1G+		Oakland	W 90–55	9–3	Simon Skjodt Assembly Hall (10,378); Bloomington, IN
December 28, 2024; 2:00 p.m., BTN		Wisconsin	W 83–52	10–3 (2–0)	Simon Skjodt Assembly Hall (11,212); Bloomington, IN
January 4, 2025; 12:00 p.m., FOX		No. 1 UCLA	L 62–73	10–4 (2–1)	Simon Skjodt Assembly Hall (11,528); Bloomington, IN
January 8, 2025; 8:00 p.m., B1G+		at Northwestern	W 68–64	11–4 (3–1)	Welsh–Ryan Arena (1,452); Evanston, IL
January 12, 2025; 3:00 p.m., Peacock		at No. 23 Iowa	W 74–67	12–4 (4–1)	Carver–Hawkeye Arena (14,998); Iowa City, IA
January 16, 2025; 7:00 p.m., Peacock		Illinois	L 54–68	12–5 (4–2)	Simon Skjodt Assembly Hall (10,534); Bloomington, IN
January 19, 2025; 12:00 p.m., NBC		No. 4 USC	L 66–73	12–6 (4–3)	Simon Skjodt Assembly Hall (12,534); Bloomington, IN
January 24, 2025; 9:00 p.m., B1G+		at Oregon	L 47–54	12–7 (4–4)	Matthew Knight Arena (5,572); Eugene, OR
January 27, 2025; 9:00 p.m., B1G+		at Washington	W 73–70	13–7 (5–4)	Alaska Airlines Arena (2,219); Seattle, WA
February 2, 2025; 12:00 p.m., FS1		Nebraska	W 76–60	14–7 (6–4)	Simon Skjodt Assembly Hall (11,476); Bloomington, IN
February 6, 2025; 6:00 p.m., BTN		Rutgers	W 81–60	15–7 (7–4)	Simon Skjodt Assembly Hall (10,418); Bloomington, IN
February 9, 2025; 3:00 p.m., B1G+		at Minnesota	L 56–66	15–8 (7–5)	Williams Arena (4,180); Minneapolis, MN
February 12, 2025; 7:00 p.m., B1G+		at Michigan	L 67–70	15–9 (7–6)	Crisler Center (2,677); Ann Arbor, MI
February 15, 2025; 12:00 p.m., BTN		Purdue; Rivalry	W 78–56	16–9 (8–6)	Simon Skjodt Assembly Hall (12,008); Bloomington, IN
February 20, 2025; 7:00 p.m., Peacock		No. 8 Ohio State	W 71–61	17–9 (9–6)	Simon Skjodt Assembly Hall (10,772); Bloomington, IN
February 23, 2025; 2:00 p.m., BTN		at No. 22 Michigan State	L 65–73	17–10 (9–7)	Breslin Student Events Center (5,657); East Lansing, MI
February 27, 2025; 7:00 p.m., Peacock		No. 19 Maryland	L 60–74	17–11 (9–8)	Simon Skjodt Assembly Hall (10,664); Bloomington, IN
March 2, 2025; 2:00 p.m., Peacock		at Purdue; Rivalry	W 77–57	18–11 (10–8)	Mackey Arena (10,512); West Lafayette, IN
Big Ten tournament
March 6, 2025; 12:00 p.m., BTN	(9)	vs. (8) Oregon; Second round	W 78–62	19–11	Gainbridge Fieldhouse; Indianapolis, IN
March 7, 2025; 12:00 p.m., BTN	(9)	vs. (1) No. 2 USC; Quarterfinals	L 79–84	19–12	Gainbridge Fieldhouse; Indianapolis, IN
NCAA tournament
March 21, 2025*; 12:30 p.m., ESPN2	(9 B2)	vs. (8 B2) Utah; First round	W 76–68	20–12	Colonial Life Arena; Columbia, SC
March 23, 2025*; 3:00 p.m., ABC	(9 B2)	at (1 B2) No. 2 South Carolina; Second round	L 53–64	20–13	Colonial Life Arena (12,322); Columbia, SC
*Non-conference game. ^{#}Rankings from AP Poll. (#) Tournament seedings in parentheses. B2=Birmingham 2. All times are in Eastern Time. Source:

== Rankings ==
Ranking movements Legend: ██ Increase in ranking ██ Decrease in ranking — = Not ranked RV = Received votes
	Week																				
Poll	Pre	1	2	3	4	5	6	7	8	9	10	11	12	13	14	15	16	17	18	19	Final
AP	25	RV	—	RV	RV	—	—	—	—	—	RV	—	—	—	—	—	—	—	—	—	
Coaches	24	RV	—	RV	—	—	—	—	—	—	—	—	—	—	—	—	—	—	—	—	
