= 2024–25 Penn State Lady Lions basketball team =

Intercollegiate basketball season

2024–25 Penn State Lady Lions basketball
- Conference: Big Ten Conference
- Record: 10–19 (1–17 Big Ten)
- Head coach: Carolyn Kieger (6th season)
- Associate head coach: Terri Williams
- Assistant coaches: Daniel Barber; Pam Brown; Sean Bair; Adrienne Motley
- Home arena: Bryce Jordan Center

2024–25 Big Ten women's basketball standings
	Conf.				Overall
Team	W		L	PCT	W		L	PCT
No. 5 USC	17	–	1	.944	31	–	4	.886
No. 3 UCLA †	16	–	2	.889	34	–	3	.919
No. 19 Ohio State	13	–	5	.722	26	–	7	.788
No. 12 Maryland	13	–	5	.722	25	–	8	.758
No. 25 Michigan	11	–	7	.611	23	–	11	.676
Michigan State	11	–	7	.611	22	–	10	.688
Illinois	11	–	7	.611	22	–	10	.688
Oregon	10	–	8	.556	20	–	12	.625
Indiana	10	–	8	.556	20	–	13	.606
Nebraska	10	–	8	.556	21	–	12	.636
Iowa	10	–	8	.556	23	–	11	.676
Washington	9	–	9	.500	19	–	14	.576
Minnesota	8	–	10	.444	25	–	11	.694
Wisconsin	4	–	14	.222	13	–	17	.433
Rutgers	3	–	15	.167	13	–	20	.394
Purdue	3	–	15	.167	10	–	19	.345
Northwestern	2	–	16	.111	9	–	18	.333
Penn State	1	–	17	.056	10	–	19	.345
† 2025 Big Ten tournament winner As of April 7, 2025; Rankings from AP poll

The 2024–25 Penn State Lady Lions basketball team represented Pennsylvania State University during the 2024–25 NCAA Division I women's basketball season. The Lady Lions were led by sixth-year head coach Carolyn Kieger and played their home games at the Bryce Jordan Center in State College, Pennsylvania as members of the Big Ten Conference. They finished the season 10–19, 1–17 in Big Ten play to finish in last place. They failed to qualify for the Big Ten women's tournament.

== Previous season ==
The Lady Lions finished the 2023–24 season 22–13, 9–9 in Big Ten play, to finish in a three-way tie for sixth place. As the No. 7 seed in the Big Ten tournament, they defeated Wisconsin in the second round, before losing in the quarterfinals to Iowa. They received an at-large bid to the WBIT, where they defeated George Mason in the first round, Belmont in the second round and Mississippi State in the quarterfinals, before losing to Villanova in the semifinals.

== Offseason ==
=== Departures ===
Penn State departures
Name	Num	Pos.	Height	Year	Hometown	Reason for departure
Ali Brigham	1	F	6' 4"	Sophomore	Franklin, MA	Transferred to Bryant
Niya Beverly	4	G	5' 7"	Graduate student	Laurel, MD	Graduated
Leilani Kapinus	5	G	5' 10"	Freshman	Madison, WI	Transferred to Vanderbilt
Tova Sabel	10	G	5' 10"	Sophomore	Stockholm, Sweden	Transferred to UC Davis
Anna Camden	11	F	6' 3"	Junior	Downingtown, PA	Transferred to Richmond
Maddie Burke	15	G	6' 0"	Sophomore	Doylestown, PA	Transferred to Villanova
Makenna Marisa	20	G	5' 11"	Junior	McMurray, PA	Signed to play professional in Hungary
Nan Garcia	24	G	6' 0"	Freshman	Jeffersonville, IN	Transferred to Toledo
Kelly Jekot	25	G	6' 0"	Graduate student	Enola, PA	Graduated

=== Incoming transfers ===
Penn State incoming transfers
Name	Num	Pos.	Height	Year	Hometown	Previous school
Gabby Elliott	0	G	5' 10"	Graduate student	Detroit, MI	Michigan State
Tamera Johnson	5	F	5' 11"	Senior	Lafayette, LA	Louisiana
Vitoria Santana	10	G	5' 9"	Junior	Santo André, Brazil	Eastern Arizona College
Gracie Merkle	44	C	6' 6"	(redshirt) Sophomore	Mount Washington, KY	Bellarmine

==== Recruiting ====
There was no recruiting class of 2024.

== Roster ==
2024–25 Penn State Nittany Lions women's basketball team
Players
Coaches

Pos.	#	Name	Height	Year	Previous school	Hometown
G	0	Gabby Elliott	5 ft 10 in (1.78 m)	GS	Michigan State	Detroit, MI
F	1	Cam Rust	6 ft 1 in (1.85 m)	Fr	Worcester Academy	Wakefield, RI
G	2	Shaelyn Steele	5 ft 6 in (1.68 m)	Fr	Russell	Ashland, KY
G	3	Moriah Murray	5 ft 8 in (1.73 m)	RS So	Drexel	Dunmore, PA
F	5	Tamera Johnson	5 ft 11 in (1.8 m)	Sr	Louisiana	Lafayette, LA
F	7	Grace Hall	6 ft 2 in (1.88 m)	RS Jr	LSU	Homewood, IL
G	10	Vitoria Santana	5 ft 8 in (1.73 m)	Jr	Eastern Arizona College	São Paulo, Brazil
F	11	Ariana Williams	6 ft 2 in (1.88 m)	Fr	Example Academy	Chicago, IL
G	12	Jayla Oden	5 ft 9 in (1.75 m)	Sr	Illinois	Baltimore, MD
G	20	Talayah Walker	5 ft 10 in (1.78 m)	Fr	Our Lady of Good Counsel	Odenton, MD
G	22	Alli Campbell	6 ft 0 in (1.83 m)	RS Sr	Notre Dame	Altoona, PA
G	24	Jill Jekot	5 ft 11 in (1.8 m)	Fr	Cumberland Valley	Enola, PA
C	44	Gracie Merkle	6 ft 6 in (1.98 m)	RS So	Bellarmine	Mount Washington, KY

Head coach

- Carolyn Kieger (Marquette)

Assistant coach(es)

- Terri Williams (Penn State)
- Daniel Barber (Florida)
- Pam Brown (Charlotte)
- Sean Bair (Dickinson College)
- Adrienne Motley (Miami (FL))

Legend

- (C) Team captain
- (S) Suspended
- (I) Ineligible
- (W) Walk-on
- Injured
- Current redshirt

Roster
Last update: February 7, 2025

== Schedule and results ==
Date time, TV	Rank^{#}	Opponent^{#}	Result	Record	High points	High rebounds	High assists	Site (attendance) city, state
Regular season
November 4, 2024*; 5:00 p.m., B1G+		Bucknell	W 90–68	1–0	28 – Murray	13 – Merkle	6 – Campbell	Bryce Jordan Center (1,575); State College, PA
November 7, 2024*; 6:00 p.m., B1G+		Canisius	W 89–57	2–0	20 – Merkle	10 – Rust	4 – 3 tied	Bryce Jordan Center (1,741); State College, PA
November 10, 2024*; 1:00 p.m., B1G+		Duquesne	W 92–83	3–0	26 – Murray	7 – Johnson	8 – Campbell	Bryce Jordan Center (2,152); State College, PA
November 14, 2024*; 11:30 a.m., B1G+		Niagara	W 101–45	4–0	24 – Merkle	7 – Merkle	9 – Oden	Bryce Jordan Center (2,311); State College, PA
November 17, 2024*; 1:00 p.m., B1G+		Monmouth	W 100–55	5–0	23 – Murray	12 – Merkle	5 – Oden	Bryce Jordan Center (1,751); State College, PA
November 21, 2024*; 7:30 p.m., Peacock		vs. Marshall; WBCA Showcase	W 74–59	6–0	28 – Merkle	11 – Merkle	4 – Johnson	State Farm Field House (657); Bay Lake, FL
November 23, 2024*; 2:30 p.m., Peacock		vs. Georgia; WBCA Showcase	W 67–47	7–0	24 – Murray	11 – Merkle	7 – Campbell	State Farm Field House (735); Bay Lake, FL
November 27, 2024*; 1:00 p.m., B1G+		Drexel	W 86–78 ^{OT}	8–0	31 – Merkle	11 – Merkle	8 – 2 tied	Bryce Jordan Center (1,888); State College, PA
December 2, 2024*; 7:00 p.m., BTN		St. John's	L 67–72	8–1	24 – Oden	7 – Elliott	5 – Murray	Bryce Jordan Center (1,759); State College, PA
December 7, 2024; 1:00 p.m., B1G+		Indiana	L 60–75	8–2 (0–1)	19 – Oden	6 – Campbell	4 – Campbell	Bryce Jordan Center (2,055); State College, PA
December 11, 2024*; 7:00 p.m., FloSports		at Providence	W 68–51	9–2	24 – Merkle	18 – Merkle	5 – Campbell	Alumni Hall (1,145); Providence, RI
December 15, 2024*; 3:00 p.m., ESPNU		at Kansas	L 65–68	9–3	22 – Merkle	12 – Merkle	6 – Campbell	Allen Fieldhouse (3,527); Lawrence, KS
December 28, 2024; 4:00 p.m., BTN		at Minnesota	L 54–90	9–4 (0–2)	19 – Elliott	4 – Merkle	8 – Murray	Williams Arena (5,312); Minneapolis, MN
January 1, 2025; 1:00 p.m., B1G+		No. 23 Iowa	L 68–80	9–5 (0–3)	32 – Elliott	12 – Merkle	6 – Murray	Bryce Jordan Center (3,417); State College, PA
January 5, 2025; 3:00 p.m., B1G+		at Nebraska	L 61–72	9–6 (0–4)	19 – Campbell	7 – Merkle	3 – Johnson	Pinnacle Bank Arena (5,945); Lincoln, NE
January 9, 2025; 6:00 p.m., B1G+		Oregon	L 61–63	9–7 (0–5)	26 – Elliott	11 – Merkle	4 – 2 tied	Bryce Jordan Center (1,701); State College, PA
January 12, 2025; 8:00 p.m., BTN		at No. 4 USC	L 73–95	9–8 (0–6)	18 – Walker	9 – Hall	4 – 3 tied	Galen Center (5,881); Los Angeles, CA
January 15, 2025; 9:30 p.m., Peacock		at No. 1 UCLA	L 67–83	9–9 (0–7)	17 – 2 tied	9 – Walker	6 – 2 tied	Walter Pyramid (1,563); Long Beach, CA
January 19, 2025; 1:00 p.m., B1G+		No. 9 Ohio State	W 62–59	10–9 (1–7)	14 – Elliott	10 – Merkle	5 – Oden	Bryce Jordan Center (2,817); State College, PA
January 22, 2025; 6:30 p.m., B1G+		at No. 21 Michigan State	L 61–82	10–10 (1–8)	24 – Murray	6 – Merkle	4 – tied	Breslin Center (3,208); East Lansing, MI
January 26, 2025; 1:00 p.m., B1G+		Rutgers	L 73–77	10–11 (1–9)	21 – Murray	8 – Merkle	7 – Campbell	Bryce Jordan Center (2,438); State College, PA
January 29, 2025; 6:00 p.m., B1G+		No. 14 Maryland	L 73–82	10–12 (1–10)	24 – Merkle	7 – Merkle	6 – Campbell	Bryce Jordan Center (2,066); State College, PA
February 5, 2025; 6:00 p.m., B1G+		Washington	L 71–82	10–13 (1–11)	17 – 2 tied	6 – Elliott	5 – Oden	Bryce Jordan Center (2,035); State College, PA
February 9, 2025; 2:00 p.m., B1G+		at Northwestern	L 63–69	10–14 (1–12)	14 – Walker	12 – Merkle	4 – Elliott	Welsh–Ryan Arena (1,902); Evanston, IL
February 13, 2025; 7:00 p.m., B1G+		at Illinois	L 55–67	10–15 (1–13)	15 – Merkle	10 – Merkle	3 – Oden	State Farm Center (3,983); Champaign, IL
February 16, 2025; 12:00 p.m., B1G+		Wisconsin	L 68–75	10–16 (1–14)	28 – Merkle	12 – Merkle	6 – Murray	Bryce Jordan Center (4,188); State College, PA
February 22, 2025; 12:00 p.m., BTN		at Michigan	L 68–78	10–17 (1–15)	18 – Merkle	10 – Merkle	7 – Campbell	Crisler Center (4,758); Ann Arbor, MI
February 27, 2025; 6:00 p.m., BTN		Purdue	L 85–92	10–18 (1–16)	32 – Elliott	7 – Johnson	7 – Campbell	Bryce Jordan Center (2,407); State College, PA
March 2, 2025; 2:00 p.m., B1G+		at Rutgers	L 70–75	10–19 (1–17)	16 – Hall	6 – 2 tied	6 – Campbell	Jersey Mike's Arena (4,729); Piscataway, NJ
*Non-conference game. ^{#}Rankings from AP poll. (#) Tournament seedings in parentheses. All times are in Eastern.

== Rankings ==
Ranking movements
	Week																				
Poll	Pre	1	2	3	4	5	6	7	8	9	10	11	12	13	14	15	16	17	18	19	Final
AP																					Not released
Coaches																					

Legend
	Increase in ranking
	Decrease in ranking
	Not ranked previous week
(RV)	Received votes
(NR)	Not ranked and did not receive votes
т	Tied with team above or below also with this symbol

The Coaches Poll did not release a Week 2 poll, and the AP poll did not release a poll after the NCAA tournament.

== See also ==
- 2024–25 Penn State Nittany Lions basketball team
