= 2024–25 Washington Huskies women's basketball team =

Intercollegiate basketball season

2024–25 Washington Huskies women's basketball

NCAA tournament, First four
- Conference: Big Ten Conference
- Record: 19–14 (9–9 Big Ten)
- Head coach: Tina Langley (4th season)
- Associate head coach: Latara King; David Adkins
- Assistant coaches: Aleah Goodman; Lauren Schwartz
- Home arena: Alaska Airlines Arena

2024–25 Big Ten women's basketball standings
	Conf.				Overall
Team	W		L	PCT	W		L	PCT
No. 5 USC	17	–	1	.944	31	–	4	.886
No. 3 UCLA †	16	–	2	.889	34	–	3	.919
No. 19 Ohio State	13	–	5	.722	26	–	7	.788
No. 12 Maryland	13	–	5	.722	25	–	8	.758
No. 25 Michigan	11	–	7	.611	23	–	11	.676
Michigan State	11	–	7	.611	22	–	10	.688
Illinois	11	–	7	.611	22	–	10	.688
Oregon	10	–	8	.556	20	–	12	.625
Indiana	10	–	8	.556	20	–	13	.606
Nebraska	10	–	8	.556	21	–	12	.636
Iowa	10	–	8	.556	23	–	11	.676
Washington	9	–	9	.500	19	–	14	.576
Minnesota	8	–	10	.444	25	–	11	.694
Wisconsin	4	–	14	.222	13	–	17	.433
Rutgers	3	–	15	.167	13	–	20	.394
Purdue	3	–	15	.167	10	–	19	.345
Northwestern	2	–	16	.111	9	–	18	.333
Penn State	1	–	17	.056	10	–	19	.345
† 2025 Big Ten tournament winner As of April 7, 2025; Rankings from AP poll

The 2024–25 Washington Huskies women's basketball team represented the University of Washington during the 2024–25 NCAA Division I women's basketball season. The Huskies, led by fourth-year head coach Tina Langley, played their home games at Alaska Airlines Arena at Hec Edmundson Pavilion in Seattle, Washington, in their first year as members of the Big Ten Conference.

== Previous season ==
The Huskies finished the 2023–24 season 16–15, 6–12 in Pac-12 play to finish in tenth place. As the No. 10 seed in the Pac-12 tournament, they lost in the first round to Arizona. They were invited to the WBIT, but lost in the first round to Georgetown.

This was also the last season that Washington played in the Pac-12 Conference before moving to the Big Ten Conference on August 1, 2024.

== Offseason ==
=== Departures ===
Washington departures
Name	Num	Pos.	Height	Year	Hometown	Reason for departure
Lauren Schwartz	2	F	5'11"	Senior	Union, KY	Graduated
Jayda Noble	3	G	5'11"	Junior	Spokane, WA	Transferred to California
Ari Long	13	G	6'0"	Freshman	Moreno Valley, CA	Transferred to Oregon
Nia Lowery	15	G	5'11"	(redshirt) Senior	Sacramento, CA	Graduated

=== Incoming ===
Washington incoming transfers
Name	Num	Pos.	Height	Year	Hometown	Previous school
Brenna McDonald	20	F	6'3"	GS senior	Natick, MA	Yale
Tayra Eke	32	C	6'3"	Senior	Madrid, Spain	Eastern Michigan

==== Recruiting ====
College recruiting
Name	Hometown	School	Height	Weight	Commit date
Devin Coppinger; G	Everson, WA	Nooksack Valley	5 ft 10 in (1.78 m)	N/A	
Devin Coppinger; G	Recruit ratings: ESPN: (95)				
Overall recruit ranking:
Note: In many cases, Scout, Rivals, 247Sports, On3, and ESPN may conflict in their listings of height and weight.; In these cases, the average was taken. ESPN grades are on a 100-point scale.; Sources: "2024 Player Commits". ESPN. Archived from the original on September 28, 2024.

==== Recruiting class of 2025 ====
College recruiting (2025)
Name	Hometown	School	Height	Weight	Commit date
Brynn McGaughy; F	Eagle, ID	Eagle High School	6 ft 2 in (1.88 m)	N/A	
Brynn McGaughy; F	Recruit ratings: ESPN: (96)				
Nina Cain; W	Sacramento, CA	C. K. McClatchy High School	6 ft 1 in (1.85 m)	N/A	
Nina Cain; W	Recruit ratings: ESPN: (92)				
Overall recruit ranking:
Note: In many cases, Scout, Rivals, 247Sports, On3, and ESPN may conflict in their listings of height and weight.; In these cases, the average was taken. ESPN grades are on a 100-point scale.; Sources: "2025 Player Commits". ESPN. Archived from the original on September 28, 2024.

== Roster ==
2024–25 Washington Huskies women's basketball team
Players
Coaches

Pos.	#	Name	Height	Year	Previous school	Hometown
G	0	Sayvia Sellers	5 ft 7 in (1.7 m)	So	Anchorage Christian School	Anchorage, AK
G	1	Hannah Stines	5 ft 11 in (1.8 m)	Jr	Orangewood Academy	La Mirada, CA
G	3	Devin Coppinger	5 ft 10 in (1.78 m)	Fr	Nooksack Valley	Everson, WA
G	5	Teagan Brown	5 ft 10 in (1.78 m)	Jr	Oak Ridge	Sacramento, CA
G	11	Chloe Briggs	5 ft 11 in (1.8 m)	So	Ontario Christian High School	Ontario, CA
F	14	Dalayah Daniels	6 ft 4 in (1.93 m)	GS	Garfield; California	Seattle, WA
F	20	Brenna McDonald	6 ft 3 in (1.91 m)	GS	Natick; Yale	Natick, MA
F	22	Shayla Gillmer (W)	6 ft 1 in (1.85 m)	Jr	Ontario Christian	San Clemete, CA
F	23	Oliva Anderson (W)	6 ft 6 in (1.98 m)	So	Ellensburg	Ellensburg, WA
G	24	Elle Ladine	5 ft 11 in (1.8 m)	Jr	Pinewood	San Francisco, CA
C	32	Tayra Eke	6 ft 3 in (1.91 m)	Sr	IES Ortega y Gassett; Eastern Michigan	Madrid, Spain

Head coach

- Tina Langley (West Alabama)

Assistant coach(es)

- Latara King (Florida Memorial)
- David Adkins (Radford)
- Aleah Goodman (Oregon State)
- Lauren Schwartz (Washington)

Legend

- (C) Team captain
- (S) Suspended
- (I) Ineligible
- (W) Walk-on
- Injured
- Current redshirt

Roster

== Schedule and results ==
Date time, TV	Rank^{#}	Opponent^{#}	Result	Record	High points	High rebounds	High assists	Site (attendance) city, state
Regular season
November 4, 2024*; 6:00 p.m., B1G+		Seattle	W 95–53	1–0	18 – Ladine	8 – McDonald	7 – Sellers	Alaska Airlines Arena (1,711); Seattle, WA
November 7, 2024*; 6:00 p.m., B1G+		Pacific	W 81–50	2–0	17 – Sellers	7 – Stines	5 – Stines	Alaska Airlines Arena (1,717); Seattle, WA
November 10, 2024*; 2:00 p.m., B1G+		Siena	W 94–51	3–0	21 – Ladine	9 – Eke	5 – Stines	Alaska Airlines Arena (2,137); Seattle, WA
November 14, 2024*; 6:00 p.m., B1G+		Eastern Washington	W 83–59	4–0	21 – Sellers	11 – Ladine	5 – Sellers	Alaska Airlines Arena (1,925); Seattle, WA
November 17, 2024*; 1:00 p.m., ESPN+		at Montana	L 68–82	4–1	22 – Sellers	7 – Stines	2 – Tied	Dahlberg Arena (2,145); Missoula, MT
November 21, 2024*; 12:00 p.m., B1G+		Cal State Fullerton	W 62–58	5–1	20 – Ladine	9 – Daniels	5 – Daniels	Alaska Airlines Arena (1,575); Seattle, WA
November 22, 2024*; 12:00 p.m., B1G+		Prairie View A&M	W 65–50	6–1	16 – Sellers	14 – Eke	3 – Sellers	Alaska Airlines Arena (1,665); Seattle, WA
November 25, 2024*; 10:30 a.m., FloSports		vs. No. 7 LSU; Pink Flamingo Championship semifinals	L 67–68	6–2	24 – Sellers	9 – Tied	5 – Stines	Baha Mar Convention Center (297); Nassau, Bahamas
November 27, 2024*; 8:00 a.m., FloSports		vs. Southern; Pink Flamingo Championship 3rd place game	W 61–43	7–2	18 – Stines	11 – Eke	6 – Stines	Baha Mar Convention Center (327); Nassau, Bahamas
December 8, 2024; 2:00 p.m., B1G+		No. 1 UCLA	L 62–73	7–3 (0–1)	19 – Ladine	8 – Stines	2 – Tied	Alaska Airlines Arena (3,453); Seattle, WA
December 14, 2024*; 6:30 p.m., BTN		Utah	L 57–67	7–4	30 – Sellers	9 – Eke	3 – Eke	Alaska Airlines Arena (2,695); Seattle, WA
December 18, 2024*; 2:00 p.m., B1G+		North Dakota State; Husky Classic	W 64–51	8–4	18 – Sellers	11 – Eke	5 – Sellers	Alaska Airlines Arena (1,738); Seattle, WA
December 19, 2024*; 2:00 p.m., B1G+		Furman; Husky Classic	W 71–43	9–4	15 – Coppinger	5 – Tied	2 – Tied	Alaska Airlines Arena (1,780); Seattle, WA
December 28, 2024; 12:00 p.m., B1G+		at Northwestern	W 90–71	10–4 (1–1)	40 – Ladine	15 – Daniels	7 – Sellers	Welsh–Ryan Arena (1,439); Evanston, IL
December 31, 2024; 10:00 a.m., BTN		at Illinois	W 84–75	11–4 (2–1)	24 – Sellers	12 – Daniels	8 – Sellers	State Farm Center (4,272); Champaign, IL
January 7, 2025; 6:00 p.m., BTN		Wisconsin	W 79–58	12–4 (3–1)	23 – Ladine	11 – Williams	9 – Sellers	Alaska Airlines Arena (2,700); Seattle, WA
January 12, 2025; 11:00 a.m., B1G+		at No. 20 Michigan State	L 68–80	12–5 (3–2)	21 – Sellers	11 – Daniels	4 – Eke	Breslin Center (4,192); East Lansing, MI
January 15, 2025; 4:00 p.m., B1G+		at Michigan	L 69–82	12–6 (3–3)	30 – Sellers	5 – Tied	2 – Stines	Crisler Center (2,687); Ann Arbor, MI
January 18, 2025; 2:00 p.m., BTN		Purdue	W 87–58	13–6 (4–3)	24 – Sellers	10 – Daniels	6 – Sellers	Alaska Airlines Arena (10,010); Seattle, WA
January 22, 2025; 6:00 p.m., Peacock		Iowa	L 61–85	13–7 (4–4)	24 – Ladine	4 – McDonald	3 – Tied	Alaska Airlines Arena (3,380); Seattle, WA
January 27, 2025; 6:00 p.m., B1G+		Indiana	L 70–73	13–8 (4–5)	21 – Daniels	5 – Tied	6 – Sellers	Alaska Airlines Arena (2,219); Seattle, WA
February 2, 2025; 2:00 p.m., BTN		at No. 8 Ohio State	L 56–66	13–9 (4–6)	17 – Stines	11 – Ladine	4 – Tied	Value City Arena (8,602); Columbus, OH
February 5, 2025; 3:00 p.m., B1G+		at Penn State	W 82–71	14–9 (5–6)	28 – Stines	7 – Stines	5 – Tied	Bryce Jordan Center (2,035); State College, PA
February 9, 2025; 1:00 p.m., B1G+		No. 16 Maryland	L 73–81	14–10 (5–7)	23 – Ladine	10 – Daniels	5 – Sellers	Alaska Airlines Arena (4,819); Seattle, WA
February 12, 2025; 6:00 p.m., B1G+		at Oregon	L 67–68	14–11 (5–8)	21 – Sellers	7 – Ladine	5 – Sellers	Matthew Knight Arena (4,720); Eugene, OR
February 16, 2025; 4:00 p.m., BTN		No. 6 USC	L 64–69	14–12 (5–9)	24 – Sellers	10 – Stines	3 – Sellers	Alaska Airlines Arena (7,913); Seattle, WA
February 20, 2025; 6:00 p.m., B1G+		Rutgers	W 83–65	15–12 (6–9)	28 – Ladine	8 – Daniels	7 – Stines	Alaska Airlines Arena (2,947); Seattle, WA
February 23, 2025; 12:00 p.m., B1G+		at Nebraska	W 83–62	16–12 (7–9)	28 – Ladine	10 – Daniels	5 – Tied	Pinnacle Bank Arena (7,476); Lincoln, NE
February 26, 2025; 5:00 p.m., B1G+		at Minnesota	W 72–62	17–12 (8–9)	26 – Ladine	10 – Daniels	5 – Stines	Williams Arena (4,297); Minneapolis, MN
March 2, 2025; 2:00 p.m., B1G+		Oregon	W 64–56	18–12 (9–9)	15 – Tied	7 – Tied	2 – Tied	Alaska Airlines Arena (4,813); Seattle, WA
Big Ten Women's Tournament
March 5, 2025; 12:30 p.m., Peacock	(12)	vs. (13) Minnesota; First Round	W 79–65	19–12	21 – Ladine	8 – Ladine	6 – Stines	Gainbridge Fieldhouse; Indianapolis, IN
March 6, 2025; 11:30 a.m., BTN	(12)	vs. (5) Michigan; Second Round	L 58–66	19–13	22 – Daniels	10 – Daniels	7 – Sellers	Gainbridge Fieldhouse; Indianapolis, IN
NCAA Tournament
March 20, 2025*; 4:00 p.m., ESPN2	(11 B2)	vs. (11 B2) Columbia; First Four	L 60–63	19–14	21 – Sellers	11 – Daniels	6 – Sellers	Carmichael Arena (492); Chapel Hill, NC
*Non-conference game. ^{#}Rankings from AP Poll. (#) Tournament seedings in parentheses. B2=Birmingham 2. All times are in Pacific Time.

== Rankings ==
Ranking movements Legend: ██ Increase in ranking ██ Decrease in ranking — = Not ranked RV = Received votes
	Week																				
Poll	Pre	1	2	3	4	5	6	7	8	9	10	11	12	13	14	15	16	17	18	19	Final
AP	—	—	—	—	—	—	—	—	—	—	RV	—	—	—	—	—					Not released
Coaches	—	—	—	—	—	—	—	—	—	—	—	—	—	—	—	—					

== See also ==
- 2024–25 Washington Huskies men's basketball team
