= 2024–25 Illinois Fighting Illini women's basketball team =

Intercollegiate basketball season

2024–25 Illinois Fighting Illini women's basketball

NCAA tournament, Second Round
- Conference: Big Ten Conference
- Record: 22–10 (11–7 Big Ten)
- Head coach: Shauna Green (3rd season)
- Associate head coach: Calamity McEntire
- Assistant coaches: Britney Anderson; DeAntoine Beasley; Emily Durr; Liza Fruendt
- Home arena: State Farm Center

2024–25 Big Ten women's basketball standings
| | Conf. | | | | Overall |
| Team | W | | L | PCT | W | | L | PCT |
|---|---|---|---|---|---|---|---|---|
| No. 5 USC | 17 | – | 1 | .944 | 31 | – | 4 | .886 |
| No. 3 UCLA † | 16 | – | 2 | .889 | 34 | – | 3 | .919 |
| No. 19 Ohio State | 13 | – | 5 | .722 | 26 | – | 7 | .788 |
| No. 12 Maryland | 13 | – | 5 | .722 | 25 | – | 8 | .758 |
| No. 25 Michigan | 11 | – | 7 | .611 | 23 | – | 11 | .676 |
| Michigan State | 11 | – | 7 | .611 | 22 | – | 10 | .688 |
| Illinois | 11 | – | 7 | .611 | 22 | – | 10 | .688 |
| Oregon | 10 | – | 8 | .556 | 20 | – | 12 | .625 |
| Indiana | 10 | – | 8 | .556 | 20 | – | 13 | .606 |
| Nebraska | 10 | – | 8 | .556 | 21 | – | 12 | .636 |
| Iowa | 10 | – | 8 | .556 | 23 | – | 11 | .676 |
| Washington | 9 | – | 9 | .500 | 19 | – | 14 | .576 |
| Minnesota | 8 | – | 10 | .444 | 25 | – | 11 | .694 |
| Wisconsin | 4 | – | 14 | .222 | 13 | – | 17 | .433 |
| Rutgers | 3 | – | 15 | .167 | 13 | – | 20 | .394 |
| Purdue | 3 | – | 15 | .167 | 10 | – | 19 | .345 |
| Northwestern | 2 | – | 16 | .111 | 9 | – | 18 | .333 |
| Penn State | 1 | – | 17 | .056 | 10 | – | 19 | .345 |
† 2025 Big Ten tournament winner As of April 7, 2025; Rankings from AP poll

The 2024–25 Illinois Fighting Illini women's basketball team represented the University of Illinois during the 2024–25 NCAA Division I women's basketball season. The Fighting Illini were led by third-year head coach Shauna Green, and they played their home games at State Farm Center. This season marked the program's 43rd season as a member of the Big Ten Conference.

== Previous season ==
The Illini finished the 2023–24 season 19–15 overall, with a 8–10 record in Big Ten play to finish in ninth place. Playing as the ninth seed in the Big Ten women's tournament, they lost in the first round to eighth seed Maryland, 75–65.

The team was not invited to the 2024 NCAA Division I women's basketball tournament, but earned an at-large bid and a number four seed to the inaugural Women's Basketball Invitation Tournament (WBIT). There, they defeated Missouri State, Stony Brook, Tulsa and first-seeded Washington State to advance to the championship game against first-seeded Villanova. The Illini defeated the Wildcats 71–57 at Hinkle Fieldhouse, marking the program's first postseason championship.

Green's .621 winning percentage after her first two seasons at Illinois is the best start for the program's head coach, after Theresa Grentz's 1995–97 teams won .617 percent of their games.

=== Accolades ===
Illinois players Makira Cook, Genesis Bryant and Kendall Bostic were named to the WBIT All-Tournament Team after winning the championship game, with Cook named as the tournament's Most Outstanding Player. Cook's honor makes her the first Illinois women's basketball player in program history to be named MVP in a postseason competition.

Four Illini earned All-Big Ten honors after the end of the season. Cook was named to the league's second team, Bostic was voted to the second team by the media and honorable mention by the coaches, Bryant was recognized as honorable mention in both polls, and Gretchen Dolan was added to the All-Freshman Team by the coaches. Dolan's honor is the first by an Illinois freshman since 2017.

In September 2024, Cook was named to the preseason All-Big Ten Team by the conference coaches.

On October 28, 2024, Cook was named as one of 20 players to the Nancy Lieberman Award pre-season watch list for the award that honors the top point guard in the country. This marked her second straight year on the watch list, and she is the first Illinois player to be recognized with this honor. On the same date, Cook was named as one of 50 players to the Naismith Trophy Women's College Player of the Year watch list.

On October 29, 2024, Bryant was recognized as one of the top 20 shooting guards in the country by landing on the Ann Meyers Drysdale Award pre-season watch list. Two days later, Bostic was one of 20 players named to the Katrina McClain Power Forward of the Year pre-season watch list.

== Off-season ==
On June 3, 2024, Illinois announced the hiring of Liza Fruendt as an assistant coach, replacing Jenna Giacone. Fruendt arrived at Illinois after three seasons as assistant coach at Tennessee.

Four of the five of the previous season's starting lineup returned for the 2024–25 season, with Cook, Bryant and Bostic returning for a fifth year awarded to them due to the COVID-19 pandemic.

In October 2024, it was announced that sophomore transfer Lety Vasconcelos will miss the entire season due to a torn ACL, sustained near the end of summer team workouts.

On October 24, 2024, the university announced that Green's contract had been extended for two additional years, keeping the coach at Illinois at least through the 2029–30 season.

=== Departures ===
Departures
| Name | Number | Pos. | Height | Year | Hometown | Reason for departure |
|---|---|---|---|---|---|---|
| Camille Jackson | 0 | G | 5'11" | Sophomore | Chicago, IL | Transferred to Miami Ohio |
| Kam'Ren Rhodes | 4 | G | 5'6" | Sophomore | Chandler, AZ | Transferred to Akron |
| Jada Peebles | 11 | G | 5'10" | Senior | Raleigh, NC | Graduated |
| Aisha Ndour | 21 | C | 6'6" | Senior | Somone, Senegal | Transferred to Wichita State |
| Samantha Dewey | 33 | F | 6'2" | Sophomore | North Andover, MA | Transferred to Richmond |
| Camille Hobby | 41 | C | 6'3" | Senior | Jacksonville, FL | Graduated |

=== Incoming transfers ===
Incoming transfers
| Name | Number | Pos. | Height | Year | Hometown | Previous school |
|---|---|---|---|---|---|---|
| Jasmine Brown-Hagger | 8 | G | 5'9" | Sophomore | Shorewood, IL | Mississippi State |
| Lety Vasconcelos | 25 | C | 6'7" | Sophomore | Miguel Calmon, Bahia, Brazil | Baylor |

=== 2024 recruiting class ===
2024 recruiting class
| Name | Number | Pos. | Height | Year | Hometown | High school |
|---|---|---|---|---|---|---|
| Irene Noya Catoira | 6 | F | 6'3" | Freshman | Vilagarcía de Arousa, Pontevedra, Galicia, Spain | Institut Joaquim Blume |
| Mia Zenere | 12 | G | 5'11" | Freshman | Mokena, IL | Example Academy |
| Berry Wallace | 20 | F | 6'1" | Freshman | Pickerington, Ohio | Pickerington High School Central |
| Hayven Smith | 25 | C | 6'6" | Freshman | Frankfort, IL | Lincoln Way East |

== Roster ==
2024–25 Illinois Fighting Illini women's basketball team
Players
Coaches

| Pos. | # | Name | Height | Year | Previous school | Hometown |
|---|---|---|---|---|---|---|
| G | 1 | Genesis Bryant | 5 ft 6 in (1.68 m) | GS | North Carolina State | Jonesboro, GA |
| G | 2 | Cori Allen | 5 ft 10 in (1.78 m) | So | Montverde Academy | Nashville, TN |
| G | 3 | Makira Cook (injured) | 5 ft 6 in (1.68 m) | GS | Dayton | Cincinnati, OH |
| G | 4 | Gretchen Dolan (injured) | 5 ft 11 in (1.8 m) | So | Williamsville South High School | Buffalo, NY |
| F | 6 | Irene Noya Catoira | 6 ft 3 in (1.91 m) | Fr | Institut Joaquim Blume | Vilagarcía de Arousa, Pontevedra, Galicia, Spain |
| G | 8 | Jasmine Brown-Hagger | 5 ft 9 in (1.75 m) | So | Mississippi State | Shorewood, IL |
| G | 12 | Mia Zenere (W) | 5 ft 11 in (1.8 m) | Fr | Example Academy | Mokena, IL |
| F | 20 | Berry Wallace | 6 ft 1 in (1.85 m) | Fr | Pickerington High School Central | Pickerington, Ohio |
| F | 22 | Shay Bollin (injured) | 6 ft 3 in (1.91 m) | Jr | Duke | Raynham, MA |
| F | 23 | Brynn Shoup-Hill | 6 ft 3 in (1.91 m) | Sr | Dayton | Goshen, IN |
| G | 24 | Adalia McKenzie | 5 ft 10 in (1.78 m) | Sr | Park Center | Brooklyn Park, MN |
| C | 25 | Hayven Smith | 6 ft 6 in (1.98 m) | Fr | Lincoln Way East | Frankfort, IL |
| C | 35 | Lety Vasoncelos (injured) | 6 ft 7 in (2.01 m) | So | Baylor | Miguel Calmon, Bahia, Brazil |
| F | 44 | Kendall Bostic | 6 ft 2 in (1.88 m) | GS | Michigan State | Kokomo, IN |

Head coach

- Shauna Green (Canisius)

Assistant coach(es)

- Calamity McEntire (Eastern Oklahoma State)
- Britney Anderson (Virginia Tech)
- DeAntoine Beasley (Tennessee Tech)
- Emily Durr (Iowa State)
- Liza Fruendt (Missouri State)

Legend

- (C) Team captain
- (S) Suspended
- (I) Ineligible
- (W) Walk-on
- Injured
- Current redshirt

Roster

== Schedule and results ==
| Date time, TV | Rank^{#} | Opponent^{#} | Result | Record | Site (attendance) city, state |
Exhibition
| November 1, 2024*; 6:00 p.m., B1G+ | | Lewis | W 80–53 | 0–0 | State Farm Center (3,556); Champaign, IL |
Regular season
| November 7, 2024*; 6:00 p.m., B1G+ | | No. 19 Florida State | W 83–74 | 1–0 | State Farm Center (3,741); Champaign, IL |
| November 10, 2024*; 7:00 p.m., BTN | | Marquette | W 65–53 | 2–0 | State Farm Center (3,748); Champaign, IL |
| November 14, 2024*; 6:00 p.m., B1G+ | No. 23 | Eastern Illinois | W 84–37 | 3–0 | State Farm Center (3,645); Champaign, IL |
| November 18, 2024*; 11:00 a.m., B1G+ | No. 22 | Le Moyne | W 94–25 | 4–0 | State Farm Center (13,486); Champaign, IL |
| November 22, 2024*; 7:00 p.m., B1G+ | No. 22 | Oregon State | W 85–66 | 5–0 | State Farm Center (3,891); Champaign, IL |
| November 26, 2024*; 1:15 p.m., BallerTV | No. 19 | vs. Maryland Eastern Shore; Music City Classic | W 75–55 | 6–0 | Trevecca Trojan Fieldhouse (341); Nashville, TN |
| November 27, 2024*; 7:00 p.m., BallerTV | No. 19 | vs. No. 14 Kentucky; Music City Classic | L 53–76 | 6–1 | Trevecca Trojan Fieldhouse (368); Nashville, TN |
| December 2, 2024*; 5:00 p.m., ESPN+ | No. 21 | at Canisius | W 68–55 | 7–1 | Koessler Athletic Center (607); Buffalo, NY |
| December 8, 2024; 3:00 p.m., BTN | No. 21 | at No. 12 Ohio State | L 74–83 | 7–2 (0–1) | Value City Arena (6,668); Columbus, OH |
| December 12, 2024*; 6:00 p.m., B1G+ | | Bradley | W 70–52 | 8–2 | State Farm Center (3,684); Champaign, IL |
| December 15, 2024*; 1:00 p.m., B1G+ | | Southern Indiana | W 73–50 | 9–2 | State Farm Center (4,108); Champaign, IL |
| December 20, 2024*; 12:00 p.m., B1G+ | | Southern | W 69–57 | 10–2 | State Farm Center (3,396); Champaign, IL |
| December 28, 2024; 2:00 p.m., B1G+ | | Oregon | W 64–59 | 11–2 (1–1) | State Farm Center (4,914); Champaign, IL |
| December 31, 2024; 12:00 p.m., BTN | | Washington | L 75–84 | 11–3 (1–2) | State Farm Center (4,272); Champaign, IL |
| January 5, 2025; 2:00 p.m., B1G+ | | at Minnesota | L 61–68 | 11–4 (1–3) | Williams Arena (4,788); Minneapolis, MN |
| January 9, 2025; 6:00 p.m., B1G+ | | No. 23 Iowa | W 62–57 | 12–4 (2–3) | State Farm Center (4,231); Champaign, IL |
| January 16, 2025; 6:00 p.m., Peacock | | at Indiana | W 68–54 | 13–4 (3–3) | Simon Skjodt Assembly Hall (10,534); Bloomington, IN |
| January 19, 2025; 2:00 p.m., B1G+ | | No. 22 Michigan State | L 68–86 | 13–5 (3–4) | State Farm Center (5,896); Champaign, IL |
| January 23, 2025; 7:00 p.m., BTN | | at Northwestern | W 85–60 | 14–5 (4–4) | Welsh-Ryan Arena (1,735); Evanston, IL |
| January 27, 2025; 7:30 p.m., BTN | | Purdue | W 74–38 | 15–5 (5–4) | State Farm Center (4,081); Champaign, IL |
| January 30, 2025; 6:00 p.m., B1G+ | | at Rutgers | W 69–65 ^{OT} | 16–5 (6–4) | Jersey Mike's Arena (2,016); Piscataway, NJ |
| February 2, 2025; 12:00 p.m., B1G+ | | at No. 14 Maryland | W 66–65 | 17–5 (7–4) | Xfinity Center (8,068); College Park, MD |
| February 6, 2025; 6:00 p.m., B1G+ | | Northwestern | W 73–60 | 18–5 (8–4) | State Farm Center (4,591); Champaign, IL |
| February 9, 2025; 3:00 p.m., B1G+ | | at Wisconsin | W 74–51 | 19–5 (9–4) | Kohl Center (4,547); Madison, WI |
| February 13, 2025; 6:00 p.m., B1G+ | | Penn State | W 67–55 | 20–5 (10–4) | State Farm Center (3,983); Champaign, IL |
| February 16, 2025; 4:00 p.m., BTN | | Nebraska | W 77–68 | 21–5 (11–4) | State Farm Center (5,881); Champaign, IL |
| February 20, 2025; 8:30 p.m., BTN | No. 25 | at No. 3 UCLA | L 55–70 | 21–6 (11–5) | Pauley Pavilion (5,435); Los Angeles, CA |
| February 23, 2025; 3:00 p.m., FS1 | No. 25 | at No. 4 USC | L 66–76 | 21–7 (11–6) | Galen Center (9,021); Los Angeles, CA |
| March 2, 2025; 12:30 p.m., BTN | | Michigan | L 69–78 | 21–8 (11–7) | State Farm Center (6,889); Champaign, IL |
Big Ten tournament
| March 6, 2025; 5:30 p.m., BTN | (7) | vs. (10) Nebraska; Second Round | L 70–74 | 21–9 | Gainbridge Fieldhouse; Indianapolis, IN |
NCAA tournament
| March 22, 2025*; 6:15 p.m., ESPNews | (8 B3) | vs. (9 B3) No. 23 Creighton; First round | W 66–57 | 22–9 | Moody Center; Austin, TX |
| March 24, 2025*; 1:00 p.m., ESPN | (8 B3) | at (1 B3) No. 5 Texas; Second round | L 48–65 | 22–10 | Moody Center (9,042); Austin, TX |
*Non-conference game. ^{#}Rankings from AP Poll. (#) Tournament seedings in parentheses. All times are in Central.

== Rankings ==
Ranking movements Legend: ██ Increase in ranking ██ Decrease in ranking — = Not ranked RV = Received votes
| | Week | | | | | | | | | | | | | | | | | | | | |
| Poll | Pre | 1 | 2 | 3 | 4 | 5 | 6 | 7 | 8 | 9 | 10 | 11 | 12 | 13 | 14 | 15 | 16 | 17 | 18 | 19 | Final |
|---|---|---|---|---|---|---|---|---|---|---|---|---|---|---|---|---|---|---|---|---|---|
| AP | RV | 23 | 22 | 19 | 21 | RV | RV | RV | RV | — | — | — | — | RV | RV | 25 | RV | — | — | — | |
| Coaches | RV | 24 | 23 | 19 | 21 | 25 | RV | RV | RV | — | — | — | — | RV | — | RV | — | — | — | — | |

== See also ==
- 2024–25 Illinois Fighting Illini men's basketball team
