= 2024–25 Rutgers Scarlet Knights women's basketball team =

American college basketball season

2024–25 Rutgers Scarlet Knights women's basketball

WNIT, Great 8
- Conference: Big Ten Conference
- Record: 13–20 (3–15 Big Ten)
- Head coach: Coquese Washington (3rd season)
- Assistant coaches: Tasha Pointer; John Hampton; Nneka Enemkpali; Jeanine Wasielewski; Johnetta Hayes
- Home arena: Jersey Mike's Arena

2024–25 Big Ten women's basketball standings
	Conf.				Overall
Team	W		L	PCT	W		L	PCT
No. 5 USC	17	–	1	.944	31	–	4	.886
No. 3 UCLA †	16	–	2	.889	34	–	3	.919
No. 19 Ohio State	13	–	5	.722	26	–	7	.788
No. 12 Maryland	13	–	5	.722	25	–	8	.758
No. 25 Michigan	11	–	7	.611	23	–	11	.676
Michigan State	11	–	7	.611	22	–	10	.688
Illinois	11	–	7	.611	22	–	10	.688
Oregon	10	–	8	.556	20	–	12	.625
Indiana	10	–	8	.556	20	–	13	.606
Nebraska	10	–	8	.556	21	–	12	.636
Iowa	10	–	8	.556	23	–	11	.676
Washington	9	–	9	.500	19	–	14	.576
Minnesota	8	–	10	.444	25	–	11	.694
Wisconsin	4	–	14	.222	13	–	17	.433
Rutgers	3	–	15	.167	13	–	20	.394
Purdue	3	–	15	.167	10	–	19	.345
Northwestern	2	–	16	.111	9	–	18	.333
Penn State	1	–	17	.056	10	–	19	.345
† 2025 Big Ten tournament winner As of April 7, 2025; Rankings from AP poll

The 2024–25 Rutgers Scarlet Knights women's basketball team represented Rutgers University during the 2024–25 college basketball season. The Scarlet Knights were led by third-year head coach Coquese Washington, and played their games at the Jersey Mike's Arena in Piscataway, New Jersey as members of the Big Ten Conference. They finished the season 11–19, 3–15 in Big Ten play to finish in a tie for 15th place. As the No. 15 seed in the Big Ten tournament, they lost to Nebraska in the first round.

== Previous season ==
The Scarlet Knights finished the 2023–24 season 8–24, 2–16 in Big Ten play, to finish in last place. They lost in the first round to Minnesota in the Big Ten tournament.

== Offseason ==
=== Departures ===
Rutgers Departures
Name	Num	Pos.	Height	Year	Hometown	Reason for Departure
Jillian Hueter	0	G	6'0"	Freshman	Clifton Park, NY	Transferred to Fairfield
Kaylene Smikle	2	G	6'0"	Sophomore	Farmingdale, NY	Transferred to Maryland
Erica Lafayette	20	G	6'0"	Senior	Baton Rouge, LA	Transferred to Louisiana
Kassondra Brown	22	C	6'2"	Graduate student	Abington, PA	Graduated

=== Incoming transfers ===
Rutgers incoming transfers
Name	Num	Pos.	Height	Year	Hometown	Previous School
JoJo Lacey	14	G	6'1"	Graduate student	Douglassville, PA	Boston College
Janae Walker	44	F	6'3"	Sophomore	Tyrone, GA	Kentucky

=== 2024 recruiting class ===
College recruiting information
Name	Hometown	School	Height	Weight	Commit date
Kiyomi McMiller; PG	Burlington, NJ	Life Center Academy	5 ft 9 in (1.75 m)	N/A	
Kiyomi McMiller; PG	Recruit ratings: ESPN: (96)				
Overall recruit ranking:
Note: In many cases, Scout, Rivals, 247Sports, On3, and ESPN may conflict in their listings of height and weight.; In these cases, the average was taken. ESPN grades are on a 100-point scale.; Sources: "2024 Player Commits". ESPN. Archived from the original on November 13, 2024.

== Roster ==
2024–25 Rutgers Scarlet Knights women's basketball team
Players
Coaches

Pos.	#	Name	Height	Year	Previous school	Hometown
G/F	1	Destiny Adams	6 ft 3 in (1.91 m)	Sr	North Carolina	Manchester, NJ
G	2	Lisa Thompson	5 ft 9 in (1.75 m)	So	Example Academy	Joliet, IL
G	3	Mya Petticord	5 ft 9 in (1.75 m)	Jr	Texas A&M	Detroit, MI
G/F	4	Antonia Bates	6 ft 3 in (1.91 m)	Jr	Rutgers Prep	Easton, PA
G	5	Deja Young (W)	5 ft 9 in (1.75 m)	Jr	Teaneck High School	Teaneck, NJ
G	11	Awa Sidibe	5 ft 11 in (1.8 m)	GS	Salt Lake Community College	Bamako, Mali
G	14	JoJo Lacey	6 ft 1 in (1.85 m)	GS	Boston College	Douglassville, PA
F	22	Zachara Perkins	6 ft 3 in (1.91 m)	Fr	Summer Creek High School	Houston, TX
G	32	Kiyomi McMiller	5 ft 8 in (1.73 m)	Fr	Life Center Academy	Silver Spring, MD
G	33	Kennedy Brandt (W)	5 ft 10 in (1.78 m)	So	Glenbard West High School	Glen Ellyn, IL
F	44	Janae Walker	6 ft 3 in (1.91 m)	So	Kentucky	Tyrone, GA
C	54	Chyna Cornwell	6 ft 3 in (1.91 m)	GS	Newton-Conover High School	Conover, NC

Head coach

- Coquese Washington (Notre Dame)

Assistant coach(es)

- Tasha Pointer (Rutgers)
- John Hampton (Mansfield)
- Nneka Enemkpali (Texas)
- Jeanine Wasielewski (Northwestern)
- Johnetta Hayes (Rice)

Legend

- (C) Team captain
- (S) Suspended
- (I) Ineligible
- (W) Walk-on
- Injured
- Current redshirt

Roster
Last update: January 13, 2024

== Schedule and results ==
Date time, TV	Rank^{#}	Opponent^{#}	Result	Record	High points	High rebounds	High assists	Site (attendance) city, state
Exhibition
October 27, 2024*; 2:00 p.m., B1G+		Caldwell	W 101–48		24 – Adams	12 – Adams	3 – Petticord	Jersey Mike's Arena (517); Piscataway, NJ
Regular season
November 4, 2024*; 7:00 p.m., B1G+		Manhattan	W 85–79	1–0	21 – Cornwell	15 – Cornwell	3 – Tied	Jersey Mike's Arena (1,517); Piscataway, NJ
November 7, 2024*; 7:00 p.m., B1G+		Cornell	W 72–61	2–0	30 – Adams	15 – Adams	8 – McMiller	Jersey Mike's Arena (1,263); Piscataway, NJ
November 10, 2024*; 2:00 p.m., B1G+		NJIT	W 84–74	3–0	36 – Adams	22 – Adams	4 – Petticord	Jersey Mike's Arena (1,548); Piscataway, NJ
November 15, 2024*; 11:00 a.m., B1G+		Iona	W 81–53	4–0	28 – Adams	11 – Adams	4 – Tied	Jersey Mike's Arena (3,349); Piscataway, NJ
November 19, 2024*; 6:00 p.m., ACCNX/ESPN+		at Virginia Tech	L 80–91	4–1	24 – McMiller	6 – Tied	4 – Thompson	Cassell Coliseum (4,644); Blacksburg, VA
November 24, 2024*; 2:00 p.m., B1G+		Princeton; Rivalry	L 49–66	4–2	27 – McMiller	10 – Tied	3 – Thompson	Jersey Mike's Arena (2,281); Piscataway, NJ
November 29, 2024*; 2:00 p.m., BTN		Marquette; Battle on the Banks	L 57–59	4–3	19 – McMiller	10 – Cornwell	2 – McMiller	Jersey Mike's Arena (1,651); Piscataway, NJ
November 30, 2024*; 2:00 p.m., B1G+		Georgia Southern; Battle on the Banks	W 77–60	5–3	25 – McMiller	11 – Tied	6 – McMiller	Jersey Mike's Arena (1,703); Piscataway, NJ
December 8, 2024; 3:00 p.m., B1G+		at Wisconsin	L 64–66	5–4 (0–1)	23 – Adams	11 – Cornwell	4 – McMiller	Kohl Center (3,266); Madison, WI
December 11, 2024*; 7:00 p.m., B1G+		Fairleigh Dickinson	W 83–58	6–4	30 – McMiller	11 – Tied	5 – McMiller	Jersey Mike's Arena (1,681); Piscataway, NJ
December 15, 2024*; 2:00 p.m., B1G+		Wagner	W 86–48	7–4	24 – McMiller	13 – Adams	6 – McMiller	Jersey Mike's Arena (1,463); Piscataway, NJ
December 21, 2024*; 12:00 p.m., B1G+		Lafayette	W 72–65	8–4	31 – McMiller	8 – Cornwell	6 – Lacey	Jersey Mike's Arena (1,858); Piscataway, NJ
December 29, 2024; 2:00 p.m., B1G+		No. 10 Ohio State	L 63–77	8–5 (0–2)	31 – Adams	17 – Adams	3 – McMiller	Jersey Mike's Arena (2,929); Piscataway, NJ
January 2, 2025; 7:00 p.m., B1G+		at No. 8 Maryland	L 61–78	8–6 (0–3)	15 – Adams	9 – Adams	3 – Sidibe	Xfinity Center (5,434); College Park, MD
January 5, 2025; 8:00 p.m., BTN		No. 4 USC	L 42–92	8–7 (0–4)	14 – Lacey	10 – Adams	3 – Adams	Jersey Mike's Arena (7,356); Piscataway, NJ
January 8, 2025; 8:00 p.m., B1G+		at Minnesota	L 50–76	8–8 (0–5)	28 – Adams	12 – Adams	5 – Petticord	Williams Arena (2,924); Minneapolis, MN
January 12, 2025; 2:00 p.m., B1G+		Nebraska	L 62–69	8–9 (0–6)	33 – McMiller	10 – Adams	2 – McMiller	Jersey Mike's Arena (4,016); Piscataway, NJ
January 15, 2025; 7:00 p.m., B1G+		No. 22 Michigan State	L 60–70	8–10 (0–7)	15 – Adams	15 – Cornwell	3 – Adams	Jersey Mike's Arena (1,585); Piscataway, NJ
January 18, 2025; 12:00 p.m., BTN		at Michigan	L 71–87	8–11 (0–8)	27 – Lacey	11 – Adams	5 – Sidibe	Crisler Center (4,683); Ann Arbor, MI
January 23, 2025; 7:00 p.m., FS1		No. 1 UCLA	L 66–84	8–12 (0–9)	17 – McMiller	13 – Adams	4 – McMiller	Jersey Mike's Arena (3,138); Piscataway, NJ
January 26, 2025; 1:00 p.m., B1G+		at Penn State	W 77–73	9–12 (1–9)	15 – Tied	9 – Cornwell	4 – McMiller	Bryce Jordan Center (2,438); State College, PA
January 30, 2025; 7:00 p.m., B1G+		Illinois	L 65–69 ^{OT}	9–13 (1–10)	22 – McMiller	7 – McMiller	4 – McMiller	Jersey Mike's Arena (2,016); Piscataway, NJ
February 6, 2025; 6:00 p.m., BTN		at Indiana	L 60–81	9–14 (1–11)	24 – Adams	11 – Lacey	2 – Tied	Simon Skjodt Assembly Hall (10,418); Bloomington, IN
February 9, 2025; 1:00 p.m., B1G+		Purdue	W 78–69	10–14 (2–11)	22 – Lacey	11 – Adams	4 – Lacey	Jersey Mike's Arena (3,882); Piscataway, NJ
February 13, 2025; 7:30 p.m., B1G+		at Iowa	L 43–55	10–15 (2–12)	11 – Lacey	9 – Lacey	3 – Adams	Carver–Hawkeye Arena (14,998); Iowa City, IA
February 17, 2025; 8:00 p.m., BTN		Northwestern	L 59–69	10–16 (2–13)	16 – Sidibe	13 – Cornwell	4 – Sidibe	Jersey Mike's Arena (2,327); Piscataway, NJ
February 20, 2025; 9:00 p.m., B1G+		at Washington	L 65–83	10–17 (2–14)	19 – Adams	6 – Adams	3 – Sidibe	Alaska Airlines Arena (2,947); Seattle, WA
February 23, 2025; 5:00 p.m., B1G+		at Oregon	L 58–77	10–18 (2–15)	20 – Adams	10 – Adams	3 – Perkins	Matthew Knight Arena (6,181); Eugene, OR
March 2, 2025; 2:00 p.m., B1G+		Penn State	W 75–70	11–18 (3–15)	19 – Adams	14 – Adams	7 – Adams	Jersey Mike's Arena (4,729); Piscataway, NJ
Big Ten women's tournament
March 5, 2025; 5:00 p.m., Peacock	(15)	vs. (10) Nebraska; First Round	L 60–84	11–19	25 – Adams	10 – Adams	3 – Tied	Gainbridge Fieldhouse; Indianapolis, IN
WNIT
March 23, 2025*; 2:00 p.m.		Army; Second Round	W 71–60	12–19	17 – Lacey	10 – Adams	4 – Tied	Jersey Mike's Arena (703); Piscataway, NJ
March 27, 2025*; 7:00 p.m.		Charleston; Super 16	W 89–67	13–19	19 – Lacey	11 – Cornwell	10 – Adams	Jersey Mike's Arena (610); Piscataway, NJ
March 30, 2025*; 2:00 p.m.		at Buffalo; Great 8	L 64–71	13–20	26 – Adams	13 – Adams	6 – Sidibe	Alumni Arena (2,042); Amherst, NY
*Non-conference game. ^{#}Rankings from AP poll. (#) Tournament seedings in parentheses. All times are in Eastern.

== See also ==
- 2024–25 Rutgers Scarlet Knights men's basketball team
