= 2024–25 Nebraska Cornhuskers women's basketball team =

American college basketball season

2024–25 Nebraska Cornhuskers women's basketball

NCAA tournament, first round
- Conference: Big Ten Conference
- Record: 21–12 (10–8 Big Ten)
- Head coach: Amy Williams (9th season)
- Assistant coaches: Julian Assibey; Tandem Mays; Jessica Keller
- Home arena: Pinnacle Bank Arena

2024–25 Big Ten women's basketball standings
	Conf.				Overall
Team	W		L	PCT	W		L	PCT
No. 5 USC	17	–	1	.944	31	–	4	.886
No. 3 UCLA †	16	–	2	.889	34	–	3	.919
No. 19 Ohio State	13	–	5	.722	26	–	7	.788
No. 12 Maryland	13	–	5	.722	25	–	8	.758
No. 25 Michigan	11	–	7	.611	23	–	11	.676
Michigan State	11	–	7	.611	22	–	10	.688
Illinois	11	–	7	.611	22	–	10	.688
Oregon	10	–	8	.556	20	–	12	.625
Indiana	10	–	8	.556	20	–	13	.606
Nebraska	10	–	8	.556	21	–	12	.636
Iowa	10	–	8	.556	23	–	11	.676
Washington	9	–	9	.500	19	–	14	.576
Minnesota	8	–	10	.444	25	–	11	.694
Wisconsin	4	–	14	.222	13	–	17	.433
Rutgers	3	–	15	.167	13	–	20	.394
Purdue	3	–	15	.167	10	–	19	.345
Northwestern	2	–	16	.111	9	–	18	.333
Penn State	1	–	17	.056	10	–	19	.345
† 2025 Big Ten tournament winner As of April 7, 2025; Rankings from AP poll

The 2024–25 Nebraska Cornhuskers women's basketball team represented the University of Nebraska–Lincoln during the 2024–25 NCAA Division I women's basketball season. The Cornhuskers were led by head coach Amy Williams in her ninth year, and played their home games at the Pinnacle Bank Arena in Lincoln, Nebraska as a member of the Big Ten Conference.

== Previous season ==
The Cornhuskers finished the 2023–24 season with a 23–12 record, including 11–7 in Big Ten play to finish in fifth place in the conference. They received an at-large bid to the 2024 NCAA Division I Women's Basketball Tournament, where they advanced to the second round.

== Offseason ==
=== Departures ===
Nebraska departures
Name	Number	Pos.	Height	Year	Hometown	Reason for Departure
Darian White	0	G	5'6"	Graduate student	Boise, Idaho	Graduated
Jaz Shelley	1	G	5'9"	Graduate student	Moe, VIC, Australia	Graduated
Annika Stewart	21	C	6'3"	Senior	Plymouth, Minnesota	Transferred to Minnesota
Maddie Krull	42	G	5'9"	Senior	Omaha, Nebraska	Graduated

=== Incoming transfers ===
Nebraska incoming transfers
Name	Pos.	Height	Year	Hometown	Previous School
Alberte Rimdal	G	5'9"	Senior	Køge, Denmark	Florida

== Roster ==
2024–25 Nebraska Cornhuskers women's basketball team
Players
Coaches

Pos.	#	Name	Height	Year	Previous school	Hometown
G	2	Logan Nissley	6 ft 0 in (1.83 m)	So	Bismarck Century	Bismarck, ND
G	3	Allison Weidner	5 ft 10 in (1.78 m)	RS Jr	Humphrey St. Francis	Humphrey, NE
G	4	Kennadi Williams	5 ft 4 in (1.63 m)	Fr	Lincoln Southwest	Lincoln, NE
G	5	Alberte Rimdal	5 ft 9 in (1.75 m)	Sr	Marselisborg Gymnasium; Florida	Køge, Denmark
F	12	Jessica Petrie	6 ft 2 in (1.88 m)	So	Lake Ginninderra College	Gold Coast, Australia
G	14	Callin Hake	5 ft 8 in (1.73 m)	Jr	Chanhassen	Victoria, MN
G	15	Kendall Moriarty	6 ft 1 in (1.85 m)	Sr	Benet Academy	Wheaton, IL
F	22	Natalie Potts	6 ft 2 in (1.88 m)	So	Incarnate Word Academy	O'Fallon, MO
G	23	Britt Prince	5 ft 11 in (1.8 m)	Fr	Elkhorn North	Omaha, NE
G/F	32	Kendall Coley	6 ft 2 in (1.88 m)	Sr	St. Louis Park	Minneapolis, MN
G/F	33	Amiah Hargrove	6 ft 2 in (1.88 m)	Fr	Christopher High School	Christopher, IL
F/C	40	Alexis Markowski	6 ft 3 in (1.91 m)	Sr	Pius X	Lincoln, NE
F/C	44	Petra Bozan	6 ft 3 in (1.91 m)	Fr	V. Gimnazija Vladimir Nazor	Split, Croatia

Head coach

- Amy Williams (Nebraska)

Assistant coach(es)

- Julian Assibey (William Penn)
- Tandem Mays (Tulsa)
- Jessica Keller (Quincy)

Legend

- (C) Team captain
- (S) Suspended
- (I) Ineligible
- (W) Walk-on
- Injured
- Current redshirt

Roster
Last update: October 15, 2024

== Schedule and results ==
Date time, TV	Rank^{#}	Opponent^{#}	Result	Record	Site (attendance) city, state
Exhibition
October 27, 2024*; 6:00 p.m., B1G+	No. 23	Doane	W 89–52	–	Pinnacle Bank Arena (4,772); Lincoln, NE
Regular season
November 4, 2024*; 12:00 p.m., B1G+	No. 23	Omaha	W 88–58	1–0	Pinnacle Bank Arena (8,106); Lincoln, NE
November 9, 2024*; 1:00 p.m., B1G+	No. 23	Southeastern Louisiana	W 78–68	2–0	Pinnacle Bank Arena (5,006); Lincoln, NE
November 12, 2024*; 7:00 p.m., B1G+	No. 21	Southern	W 84–58	3–0	Pinnacle Bank Arena (4,326); Lincoln, NE
November 16, 2024*; 7:00 p.m., B1G+	No. 21	vs. South Dakota	W 113–70	4–0	Sanford Pentagon (3,297); Sioux Falls, SD
November 19, 2024*; 7:00 p.m., B1G+	No. 21	North Alabama	W 85–48	5–0	Pinnacle Bank Arena (4,414); Lincoln, NE
November 22, 2024*; 4:00 p.m., FloHoops	No. 21	at Creighton; Rivalry	L 74–80	5–1	D. J. Sokol Arena (2,374); Omaha, NE
November 26, 2024*; 7:00 p.m., B1G+	No. 25	Kansas City	W 84–38	6–1	Pinnacle Bank Arena (4,753); Lincoln, NE
December 3, 2024*; 7:00 p.m., B1G+	No. 25	Lindenwood	W 69–48	7–1	Pinnacle Bank Arena (4,252); Lincoln, NE
December 8, 2024; 1:00 p.m., BTN	No. 25	Minnesota	W 84–65	8–1 (1–0)	Pinnacle Bank Arena (6,009); Lincoln, NE
December 11, 2024*; 7:00 p.m., B1G+	No. 24	Tarleton	W 63–50	9–1	Pinnacle Bank Arena (4,259); Lincoln, NE
December 15, 2024*; 12:00 p.m., B1G+	No. 24	Chattanooga	W 66–42	10–1	Pinnacle Bank Arena (4,637); Lincoln, NE
December 21, 2024*; 4:30 p.m., ACCNX/ESPN+	No. 23	at No. 17 Georgia Tech	L 61–72	10–2	McCamish Pavilion (1,971); Atlanta, GA
December 29, 2024; 4:00 p.m., B1G+		at No. 1 UCLA	L 54–91	10–3 (1–1)	Pauley Pavilion (5,339); Los Angeles, CA
January 1, 2025; 2:00 p.m., BTN		at No. 4 USC	L 55–75	10–4 (1–2)	Galen Center (5,662); Los Angeles, CA
January 5, 2025; 2:00 p.m., B1G+		Penn State	W 72–61	11–4 (2–2)	Pinnacle Bank Arena (5,945); Lincoln, NE
January 8, 2025; 7:00 p.m., B1G+		No. 20 Michigan State	W 85–80	12–4 (3–2)	Pinnacle Bank Arena (4,903); Lincoln, NE
January 12, 2025; 1:00 p.m., B1G+		at Rutgers	W 69–62	13–4 (4–2)	Jersey Mike's Arena (4,016); Piscataway, NJ
January 16, 2025; 6:00 p.m., BTN		at Iowa	W 87-84 ^{OT}	14–4 (5–2)	Carver–Hawkeye Arena (14,998); Iowa City, IA
January 20, 2025; 7:00 p.m., BTN		Wisconsin	W 91–60	15–4 (6–2)	Pinnacle Bank Arena (4,571); Lincoln, NE
January 26, 2025; 2:00 p.m., B1G+		No. 12 Ohio State	L 66–72	15–5 (6–3)	Pinnacle Bank Arena (9,772); Lincoln, NE
January 30, 2025; 6:00 p.m., B1G+		at Purdue	W 74–68	16–5 (7–3)	Mackey Arena (6,315); West Lafayette, IN
February 2, 2025; 11:00 a.m., FS1		at Indiana	L 60–76	16–6 (7–4)	Simon Skjodt Assembly Hall (11,476); Bloomington, IN
February 6, 2025; 7:00 p.m., Peacock		Michigan	L 60–78	16–7 (7–5)	Pinnacle Bank Arena (5,617); Lincoln, NE
February 10, 2025; 7:00 p.m., BTN		Iowa	L 66–81	16–8 (7–6)	Pinnacle Bank Arena (6,535); Lincoln, NE
February 13, 2025; 5:30 p.m., BTN		at No. 17 Maryland	W 91–71	17–8 (8–6)	Xfinity Center (7,029); College Park, MD
February 16, 2025; 4:00 p.m., BTN		at Illinois	L 68–77	17–9 (8–7)	State Farm Center (5,881); Champaign, IL
February 19, 2025; 7:00 p.m., B1G+		Oregon	W 94–90 ^{OT}	18–9 (9–7)	Pinnacle Bank Arena (5,257); Lincoln, NE
February 23, 2025; 2:00 p.m., B1G+		Washington	L 62–83	18–10 (9–8)	Pinnacle Bank Arena (7,476); Lincoln, NE
March 2, 2025; 2:00 p.m., B1G+		at Northwestern	W 98–77	19–10 (10–8)	Welsh–Ryan Arena (2,408); Evanston, IL
Big Ten tournament
March 5, 2025; 5:00 p.m., Peacock	(10)	vs. (15) Rutgers; First round	W 84–60	20–10	Gainbridge Fieldhouse; Indianapolis, IN
March 6, 2025; 5:30 p.m., BTN	(10)	vs. (7) Illinois; Second round	W 74–70	21–10	Gainbridge Fieldhouse; Indianapolis, IN
March 7, 2025; 5:30 p.m., BTN	(10)	vs. (2) No. 4 UCLA; Quarterfinals	L 74–85	21–11	Gainbridge Fieldhouse; Indianapolis, IN
NCAA tournament
March 21, 2025; 5:00 p.m., ESPN	(10 B3)	vs. (7 B3) Louisville; First round	L 58–63	21–12	Schollmaier Arena (6,464); Fort Worth, TX
*Non-conference game. ^{#}Rankings from AP Poll. (#) Tournament seedings in parentheses. B3=Birmingham 3. All times are in Central. Source:

== Rankings ==
Ranking movements Legend: ██ Increase in ranking ██ Decrease in ranking — = Not ranked RV = Received votes
	Week																				
Poll	Pre	1	2	3	4	5	6	7	8	9	10	11	12	13	14	15	16	17	18	19	Final
AP	23	21	21	25	25	24	23	RV	RV	—	RV	RV	RV	—	—	—	—	—	—	—	
Coaches	23	20	19	25	RV	RV	RV	RV	RV	RV	RV	25	RV	—	—	—	—	—	—	—	
