= 2024–25 Northwestern Wildcats women's basketball team =

Intercollegiate basketball season

2024–25 Northwestern Wildcats women's basketball
- Conference: Big Ten Conference
- Record: 9–18 (2–16 Big Ten)
- Head coach: Joe McKeown (17th season)
- Associate head coach: Tangela Smith
- Assistant coaches: Maggie Lyon; Brittany Johnson
- Home arena: Welsh–Ryan Arena

2024–25 Big Ten women's basketball standings
	Conf.				Overall
Team	W		L	PCT	W		L	PCT
No. 5 USC	17	–	1	.944	31	–	4	.886
No. 3 UCLA †	16	–	2	.889	34	–	3	.919
No. 19 Ohio State	13	–	5	.722	26	–	7	.788
No. 12 Maryland	13	–	5	.722	25	–	8	.758
No. 25 Michigan	11	–	7	.611	23	–	11	.676
Michigan State	11	–	7	.611	22	–	10	.688
Illinois	11	–	7	.611	22	–	10	.688
Oregon	10	–	8	.556	20	–	12	.625
Indiana	10	–	8	.556	20	–	13	.606
Nebraska	10	–	8	.556	21	–	12	.636
Iowa	10	–	8	.556	23	–	11	.676
Washington	9	–	9	.500	19	–	14	.576
Minnesota	8	–	10	.444	25	–	11	.694
Wisconsin	4	–	14	.222	13	–	17	.433
Rutgers	3	–	15	.167	13	–	20	.394
Purdue	3	–	15	.167	10	–	19	.345
Northwestern	2	–	16	.111	9	–	18	.333
Penn State	1	–	17	.056	10	–	19	.345
† 2025 Big Ten tournament winner As of April 7, 2025; Rankings from AP poll

The 2024–25 Northwestern Wildcats women's basketball team represented Northwestern University during the 2024–25 NCAA Division I women's basketball season. The Wildcats, led by 17th-year head coach Joe McKeown, played their home games at the Welsh–Ryan Arena in Evanston, Illinois as members of the Big Ten Conference. They finished the season 9–18, 2–16 in Big Ten play to finish in 17th place. They failed to qualify for the Big Ten tournament.

Due to the wildfires in the Los Angeles and Ventura counties, Northwestern's road games at UCLA on January 12 and USC on January 15 were postponed. Northwestern forfeited the games in February 2025. UCLA and USC each were credited with a win, and the Wildcats were assessed two losses.

== Previous season ==
The Wildcats finished the 2023–24 season 9–21, 2–16 in Big Ten play, to finish in 13th place. They lost in the first round of the Big Ten tournament to Purdue.

== Offseason ==
=== Departures ===
Northwestern departures
Name	Num	Pos.	Height	Year	Hometown	Reason for departure
Maggie Pina	3	G	5' 7"	Graduate student	West Chester, PA	Graduated
Hailey Weaver	11	G	5' 11"	Junior	Solon, OH	Left the team
Paige Mott	20	F	6' 1"	Senior	Philadelphia, PA	Transferred to George Washington
Alana Goodchild	22	F	6' 2"	Sophomore	Sydney, Australia	Transferred to Santa Clara
Jasmine McWilliams	23	G	5' 11"	Senior	Indianapolis, IN	Graduated

=== Incoming transfers ===
Northwestern incoming transfers
Name	Num	Pos.	Height	Year	Hometown	Previous school
Kyla Jones	2	G	5' 9"	Graduate student	Chicago, IL	Brown
Grace Sullivan	22	F	6'4"	Junior	Antioch, IL	Bucknell
Taylor Williams	33	F	6' 2"	Graduate student	New Baltimore, MI	Michigan

=== 2024 recruiting class ===
College recruiting information
Name	Hometown	School	Height	Weight	Commit date
Xamiya Walton; PG	Chicago, IL	Butler College Prep	5 ft 5 in (1.65 m)	N/A	
Xamiya Walton; PG	Recruit ratings: ESPN: (94)				
Tayla Thomas; W	Montclair, NJ	IMG Academy	6 ft 2 in (1.88 m)	N/A	
Tayla Thomas; W	Recruit ratings: ESPN: (91)				
Overall recruit ranking:
Note: In many cases, Scout, Rivals, 247Sports, On3, and ESPN may conflict in their listings of height and weight.; In these cases, the average was taken. ESPN grades are on a 100-point scale.; Sources: "2024 Player Commits". ESPN. Archived from the original on November 7, 2024.

== Roster ==
2024–25 Northwestern Wildcats women's basketball team
Players
Coaches

Pos.	#	Name	Height	Year	Previous school	Hometown
F	0	Rachel Mutombo	6 ft 3 in (1.91 m)	So	Good Counsel	Silver Spring, MD
G	1	Xamiya Walton	5 ft 7 in (1.7 m)	Fr	Butler College Prep	Chicago, IL
G	2	Kyla Jones	5 ft 9 in (1.75 m)	GS	Brown	Chicago, IL
G	3	Claire Keswick (W)	6 ft 0 in (1.83 m)	Fr	Tabor Academy	Wrentham, MA
G	7	Caroline Lau	5 ft 9 in (1.75 m)	Jr	St. Luke's School	Westport, CT
G/F	8	Kat Righeimer (W)	6 ft 1 in (1.85 m)	Fr	Sage Hill School	Costa Mesa, CA
F	10	Caileigh Walsh	6 ft 3 in (1.91 m)	Sr	Gill St. Bernard's	Sparta, NJ
G	12	Casey Harter	5 ft 11 in (1.8 m)	So	Souderton	Harleysville, PA
F	13	Mercy Ademusayo	6 ft 4 in (1.93 m)	Sr	Linden Hall	Ode-Irele, Nigeria
G	21	Melannie Daley	5 ft 11 in (1.8 m)	Sr	Hastings	Hastings-on-Hudson, NY
F	22	Grace Sullivan	6 ft 4 in (1.93 m)	Jr	Bucknell	Antioch, IL
F	23	Tayla Thomas	6 ft 3 in (1.91 m)	Fr	IMG Academy	East Orange, NJ
F	25	Lauren Trumpy	6 ft 5 in (1.96 m)	Jr	Trinity	Camp Hill, PA
F	31	Crystal Fuqu Wang	6 ft 2 in (1.88 m)	So	Sierra Canyon	Beijing, China
F	33	Taylor Williams	6 ft 2 in (1.88 m)	GS	Michigan	New Baltimore, MI

Head coach

- Joe McKeown (Kent State)

Assistant coach(es)

- Tangela Smith (Iowa)
- Maggie Lyon (Northwestern)
- Brittany Johnson (Ohio State)

Legend

- (C) Team captain
- (S) Suspended
- (I) Ineligible
- (W) Walk-on
- Injured
- Current redshirt

Roster
Last update: June 15, 2025

== Schedule and results ==
Date time, TV	Rank^{#}	Opponent^{#}	Result	Record	High points	High rebounds	High assists	Site (attendance) city, state
Exhibition
November 3, 2024*; 6:00 p.m., B1G+		UW–Parkside	W 88–64		18 – Jones	16 – Williams	9 – Lau	Welsh–Ryan Arena (312); Evanston, IL
Regular season
November 6, 2024*; 7:00 p.m., B1G+		Illinois State	L 77–81	0–1	28 – Jones	8 – Sullivan	5 – Lau	Welsh–Ryan Arena (1,119); Evanston, IL
November 10, 2024*; 2:00 p.m., B1G+		Lehigh	L 68–85	0–2	22 – Williams	11 – Williams	12 – Lau	Welsh–Ryan Arena (1,166); Evanston, IL
November 14, 2024*; 6:00 p.m., BTN		Utah	W 71–69	1–2	23 – Daley	10 – Williams	10 – Lau	Welsh–Ryan Arena (1,114); Evanston, IL
November 23, 2024*; 12:00 p.m., B1G+		Harvard	L 50–75	1–3	13 – Walsh	6 – Lau	4 – Daley	Welsh–Ryan Arena (926); Evanston, IL
November 26, 2024*; 6:00 p.m., ESPN+		at Loyola Chicago	W 73–64	2–3	22 – Williams	14 – Williams	5 – Williams	Joseph J. Gentile Arena (567); Chicago, IL
December 1, 2024*; 1:00 p.m., B1G+		Cornell	W 67–54	3–3	22 – Sullivan	13 – Williams	12 – Lau	Welsh–Ryan Arena (2,163); Evanston, IL
December 4, 2024*; 7:00 p.m., B1G+		DePaul	W 64–56	4–3	14 – Walsh	12 – Lau	7 – Lau	Welsh–Ryan Arena (1,045); Evanston, IL
December 8, 2024; 1:00 p.m., B1G+		at No. 23 Michigan	L 54–60	4–4 (0–1)	14 – Jones	11 – Williams	7 – Lau	Crisler Center (3,636); Ann Arbor, MI
December 15, 2024*; 2:00 p.m., B1G+		Bradley	W 67–57	5–4	13 – Williams	11 – Williams	5 – 2 tied	Welsh–Ryan Arena (1,130); Evanston, IL
December 18, 2024*; 11:00 a.m., B1G+		UNLV	W 79–76 ^{OT}	6–4	21 – Daley	12 – Walsh	8 – Lau	Welsh–Ryan Arena (1,092); Evanston, IL
December 20, 2024*; 12:00 p.m., ESPN+		vs. Charleston; Hawk Classic semifinals	L 62–68	6–5	20 – Walsh	11 – Williams	7 – Lau	Hagan Arena (220); Philadelphia, PA
December 21, 2024*; 10:00 a.m., ESPN+		vs. Howard; Hawk Classic 3rd-place game	W 68–66	7–5	17 – Sullivan	11 – Williams	5 – Lau	Hagan Arena; Philadelphia, PA
December 28, 2024; 2:00 p.m., B1G+		Washington	L 71–90	7–6 (0–2)	15 – Lau	7 – Williams	5 – Daley	Welsh–Ryan Arena (1,439); Evanston, IL
December 31, 2024; 2:00 p.m., BTN		Oregon	L 65–85	7–7 (0–3)	15 – Walsh	4 – 3 tied	5 – Harter	Welsh–Ryan Arena (1,377); Evanston, IL
January 5, 2025; 12:00 p.m., B1G+		at No. 10 Ohio State	L 62–92	7–8 (0–4)	15 – Jones	7 – Walsh	7 – Lau	Value City Arena (7,190); Columbus, OH
January 8, 2025; 7:00 p.m., B1G+		Indiana	L 64–68	7–9 (0–5)	15 – Williams	13 – Williams	6 – Daley	Welsh–Ryan Arena (1,452); Evanston, IL
January 12, 2025; 4:00 p.m., B1G+		at No. 1 UCLA	L	7–9 (0–6)	–	–	–	Pauley Pavilion; Los Angeles, CA
January 15, 2025; 9:00 p.m., Peacock		at No. 4 USC	L	7–9 (0–7)	–	–	–	Galen Center; Los Angeles, CA
January 19, 2025; 2:00 p.m., B1G+		No. 24т Minnesota	L 82–87	7–10 (0–8)	18 – Sullivan	10 – Williams	7 – Lau	Welsh–Ryan Arena (1,854); Evanston, IL
January 23, 2025; 7:00 p.m., BTN		Illinois	L 60–85	7–11 (0–9)	14 – Jones	9 – Williams	5 – Lau	Welsh–Ryan Arena (1,735); Evanston, IL
January 28, 2025; 7:00 p.m., BTN		at Iowa	L 80–85	7–12 (0–10)	15 – 2 tied	8 – Williams	7 – Lau	Carver–Hawkeye Arena (14,998); Iowa City, IA
February 2, 2025; 2:00 p.m., B1G+		No. 16 Michigan State	L 75–89	7–13 (0–11)	18 – Williams	12 – Williams	4 – 2 tied	Welsh–Ryan Arena (1,861); Evanston, IL
February 6, 2025; 6:00 p.m., B1G+		at Illinois	L 60–73	7–14 (0–12)	17 – Walsh	7 – Daley	3 – Daley	State Farm Center (4,591); Champaign, IL
February 9, 2025; 1:00 p.m., B1G+		Penn State	W 69–63	8–14 (1–12)	20 – Daley	11 – Williams	8 – Lau	Welsh–Ryan Arena (1,902); Evanston, IL
February 12, 2025; 6:00 p.m., B1G+		at Purdue	L 60–75	8–15 (1–13)	17 – Williams	16 – Williams	5 – Harter	Mackey Arena (4,002); West Lafayette, IN
February 17, 2025; 7:00 p.m., BTN		at Rutgers	W 69–59	9–15 (2–13)	13 – Walsh	7 – Daley	9 – Lau	Jersey Mike's Arena (2,327); Piscataway, NJ
February 20, 2025; 6:30 p.m., BTN		No. 21 Maryland	L 79–85	9–16 (2–14)	22 – Daley	11 – Lau	10 – Lau	Welsh–Ryan Arena (1,726); Evanston, IL
February 23, 2025; 2:00 p.m., B1G+		at Wisconsin	L 68–73	9–17 (2–15)	18 – Walsh	11 – Williams	7 – Lau	Kohl Center (4,390); Madison, WI
March 2, 2025; 2:00 p.m., B1G+		Nebraska	L 77–98	9–18 (2–16)	22 – Walsh	7 – Williams	6 – Daley	Welsh–Ryan Arena (2,408); Evanston, IL
*Non-conference game. ^{#}Rankings from AP poll. (#) Tournament seedings in parentheses. All times are in Central.

== See also ==
- 2024–25 Northwestern Wildcats men's basketball team
