= 2025 Big Ten women's basketball tournament =

- Classification: Division I
- Season: 2024–25
- Teams: 15
- Site: Gainbridge Fieldhouse; Indianapolis, Indiana
- Champions: UCLA (1st title)
- Winning coach: Cori Close (1st title)
- MVP: Lauren Betts (UCLA)
- Television: Peacock, BTN, CBS/Paramount+

2024–25 Big Ten women's basketball standings
	Conf.				Overall
Team	W		L	PCT	W		L	PCT
No. 5 USC	17	–	1	.944	31	–	4	.886
No. 3 UCLA †	16	–	2	.889	34	–	3	.919
No. 19 Ohio State	13	–	5	.722	26	–	7	.788
No. 12 Maryland	13	–	5	.722	25	–	8	.758
No. 25 Michigan	11	–	7	.611	23	–	11	.676
Michigan State	11	–	7	.611	22	–	10	.688
Illinois	11	–	7	.611	22	–	10	.688
Oregon	10	–	8	.556	20	–	12	.625
Indiana	10	–	8	.556	20	–	13	.606
Nebraska	10	–	8	.556	21	–	12	.636
Iowa	10	–	8	.556	23	–	11	.676
Washington	9	–	9	.500	19	–	14	.576
Minnesota	8	–	10	.444	25	–	11	.694
Wisconsin	4	–	14	.222	13	–	17	.433
Rutgers	3	–	15	.167	13	–	20	.394
Purdue	3	–	15	.167	10	–	19	.345
Northwestern	2	–	16	.111	9	–	18	.333
Penn State	1	–	17	.056	10	–	19	.345
† 2025 Big Ten tournament winner As of April 7, 2025; Rankings from AP poll

The 2025 Big Ten women's basketball tournament (branded as the 2025 TIAA Big Ten Women's Basketball Tournament for sponsorship reasons) was a postseason women's basketball tournament for the Big Ten Conference of the 2024–25 NCAA Division I women's basketball season which took place from March 5–9, 2025. The tournament was held at the Gainbridge Fieldhouse in Indianapolis, Indiana. It was the final event of the 2024–25 Big Ten Conference women's basketball season. The tournament winner was UCLA. The Bruins received the conference's automatic bid to the 2025 NCAA Division I women's basketball tournament.

This was the first season in a new tournament format as the conference expanded to 18 teams, following the additions of Oregon, UCLA, USC, and Washington. The top 15 teams participated with the bottom three teams not qualifying for the tournament. The field was announced on March 2, 2025. The top four seeds were USC, UCLA, Ohio State, and Maryland. Purdue, Penn State, and Northwestern did not participate as the lowest three teams in the standings.

== Seeds ==
The top 15 Big Ten schools participated in the tournament. Teams were seeded by conference record, with a tiebreaker system used to seed teams with identical conference records. The top nine teams received a first round bye and the top four teams received a double bye.

Seed	School	Conference	Tiebreak 1a	Tiebreak 1b	Tiebreak 2a, 2b	Tiebreak 2c	Tiebreak 2d
1	USC	17–1					
2	UCLA	16–2					
3	Ohio State	13–5	1–1 vs. Maryland	—N/a	0–1 vs. UCLA/USC	3–0 vs. ILL, MICH, MSU	
4	Maryland	13–5	1–1 vs. Ohio State	—N/a	0–1 vs. UCLA/USC	2–1 vs. ILL, MICH, MSU	
5	Michigan	11–7	2–1 vs ILL, MSU	1–1 vs. Michigan State	0–1 vs. UCLA/USC	0–2 vs. MD, OSU	3–1 vs. IND, IOWA, NEB, ORE
6	Michigan State	11–7	2–1 vs. ILL, MICH	1–1 vs. Michigan	0–1 vs. UCLA/USC	0–2 vs. MD, OSU	2–2 vs. IND, IOWA, NEB, ORE
7	Illinois	11–7	0–2 vs. MICH, MSU				
8	Oregon	10–8	2–1 vs. IND, IOWA, NEB	1–0 vs. Indiana			
9	Indiana	10–8	2–1 vs. IOWA, NEB, ORE	0–1 vs. Oregon			
10	Nebraska	10–8	2–2 vs. IND, IOWA, ORE				
11	Iowa	10–8	1–3 vs. IND, NEB, ORE				
12	Washington	9–9					
13	Minnesota	8–10					
14	Wisconsin	4–14					
15	Rutgers	3–15	1–0 vs. Purdue				
DNQ	Purdue	3–15	0–1 vs. Rutgers				
DNQ (Note: Due to the wildfires in the Los Angeles and Ventura County, the Northwestern road games at UCLA on January 12 and USC on January 15 were postponed. Northwestern forfeited the games in February 2025. UCLA and USC each were credited with a win, and the Wildcats were assessed two losses.)	Northwestern	2–16					
DNQ	Penn State	1–17					

Tiebreakers:

== Schedule ==
Session	Game	Time*	Matchup^{#}	Score	Television	Attendance
First round – Wednesday, March 5
1	1	3:30 p.m.	No. 13 Minnesota vs. No. 12 Washington	65–79	Peacock	
1	2	6:00 p.m.	No. 15 Rutgers vs. No. 10 Nebraska	60–84	Peacock	
1	3	8:30 p.m.	No. 14 Wisconsin vs. No. 11 Iowa	54–81	Peacock	
Second round – Thursday, March 6
2	4	12:00 p.m.	No. 9 Indiana vs. No. 8 Oregon	78–62	BTN	7,028
2	5	2:30 p.m.	No. 12 Washington vs. No. 5 Michigan	58–66	BTN	7,028
3	6	6:30 p.m.	No. 10 Nebraska vs. No. 7 Illinois	74–70	BTN	7,028
3	7	9:00 p.m.	No. 11 Iowa vs. No. 6 Michigan State	74–61	BTN	7,028
Quarterfinals – Friday, March 7
4	8	12:00 p.m.	No. 9 Indiana vs. No. 1 USC	79–84	BTN	7,352
4	9	2:30 p.m.	No. 5 Michigan vs. No. 4 Maryland	98–71	BTN	7,352
5	10	6:30 p.m.	No. 10 Nebraska vs. No. 2 UCLA	74–85	BTN	7,500
5	11	9:00 p.m.	No. 11 Iowa vs. No. 3 Ohio State	59–60	BTN	7,500
Semifinals – Saturday, March 8
6	12	3:00 p.m.	No. 1 USC vs. No. 5 Michigan	82–70	BTN	7,805
6	13	5:30 p.m.	No. 2 UCLA vs. No. 3 Ohio State	75–46	BTN	7,805
Championship – Sunday, March 9
7	14	4:30 p.m.	No. 1 USC vs. No. 2 UCLA	67–72	CBS	8,358

*Game times in EST through the semifinals and EDT for the championship. #Rankings denote tournament seeding.

== Bracket ==
First round Wednesday, March 5 Peacock
12	Washington	79
13	Minnesota	65
10	Nebraska	84
15	Rutgers	60
11	Iowa	81
14	Wisconsin	54

Second round Thursday, March 6 BTN
8	Oregon	62
9	Indiana	78
5	Michigan	66
12	Washington	58
7	Illinois	70
10	Nebraska	74
6	Michigan State	61
11	Iowa	74

Quarterfinals; Friday, March 7 BTN
1	USC	84
9	Indiana	79
4	Maryland	71
5	Michigan	98
2	UCLA	85
10	Nebraska	74
3	Ohio State	60
11	Iowa	59

Semifinals; Saturday, March 8 BTN
1	USC	82
5	Michigan	70
2	UCLA	75
3	Ohio State	46

Championship; Sunday, March 9 CBS
1	USC	67
2	UCLA	72

* denotes overtime period

== Game summaries ==
=== First round ===
Peacock

March 5
3:30 p.m.

Recap

No. 13 Minnesota 65, No. 12 Washington 79
Scoring by quarter: 12–16, 18–16, 18–22, 17–25
Pts: Grace Grocholski (21); Rebs: Grace Grocholski (7); Asts: Grace Grocholski (5)	Pts: Elle Ladine (21); Rebs: Elle Ladine (8); Asts: Hannah Stines (6)

Gainbridge Fieldhouse
Indianapolis, IN
Referees: Brenda Pantoja, Natasha Camy, Tim Daley

Peacock

March 5
6:00 p.m.

Recap

No. 15 Rutgers 60, No. 10 Nebraska 84
Scoring by quarter: 13–22, 11–17, 13–22, 23–23
Pts: Destiny Adams (25); Rebs: Destiny Adams (10); Asts: Tied (3)	Pts: Alexis Markowski (19); Rebs: Alexis Markowski (10); Asts: Alberte Rimdal (8)

Gainbridge Fieldhouse
Indianapolis, IN
Referees: Michol Murry, Nykesha Thompson, Mark Resch

Peacock

March 5
8:30 p.m.

Recap

No. 14 Wisconsin 54, No. 11 Iowa 81
Scoring by quarter: 9–25, 14–18, 16–22, 15–16
Pts: Serah Williams (22); Rebs: Serah Williams (5); Asts: Ronnie Porter (6)	Pts: Lucy Olsen (19); Rebs: Sydney Affolter (7); Asts: Kylie Feuerbach (6)

Gainbridge Fieldhouse
Indianapolis, IN
Referees: Maj Forsberg, Michael McConnell, Tiara Cruse

=== Second round ===
BTN

March 6
12:00 p.m.

No. 9 Indiana 78, No. 8 Oregon 62
Scoring by quarter: 23–11, 17–19, 16–18, 22–14
Pts: Yarden Garzon (18); Rebs: Sydney Parrish (6); Asts: Chloe Moore-McNeil (5)	Pts: Peyton Scott (16); Rebs: Peyton Scott (8); Asts: Deja Kelly (5)

Gainbridge Fieldhouse
Indianapolis, IN

BTN

March 6
2:30 p.m.

No. 12 Washington 58, No. 5 Michigan 66
Scoring by quarter: 13–14, 15–15, 13–23, 17–14
Pts: Dalayah Daniels (22); Rebs: Dalayah Daniels (10); Asts: Sayvia Sellers (7)	Pts: Olivia Olson (21); Rebs: Tied (6); Asts: Mila Holloway (8)

Gainbridge Fieldhouse
Indianapolis, IN

BTN

March 6
6:30 p.m.

No. 10 Nebraska 74, No. 7 Illinois 70
Scoring by quarter: 15–19, 15–13, 19–24, 25–14
Pts: Britt Prince (17); Rebs: Logan Nissley (7); Asts: Britt Prince (5)	Pts: Genesis Bryant (20); Rebs: Tied (6); Asts: Adalia McKenzie (10)

Gainbridge Fieldhouse
Indianapolis, IN
Referees: Kevin Pethtel, Cameron Inouye, Mark Resch

BTN

March 6
9:00 p.m.

No. 11 Iowa 74, No. 6 Michigan State 61
Scoring by quarter: 12–16, 20–9, 22–23, 20–13
Pts: Lucy Olsen (21); Rebs: Hannah Stuelke (10); Asts: Lucy Olsen (9)	Pts: Julia Ayrault (17); Rebs: Grace VanSlooten (10); Asts: Jaddan Simmons (5)

Gainbridge Fieldhouse
Indianapolis, IN
Attendance: 7,028
Referees: Brenda Pantoja, Natasha Camy, Angie Enlund

=== Quarterfinals ===
BTN

March 7
12:00 p.m.

Recap

No. 9 Indiana 79, No. 1 USC 84
Scoring by quarter: 18–23, 16–15, 23–21, 22–25
Pts: Yarden Garzon (23); Rebs: Yarden Garzon (8); Asts: Chloe Moore-McNeil (7)	Pts: JuJu Watkins (31); Rebs: Tied (10); Asts: Talia von Oelhoffen (5)

Gainbridge Fieldhouse
Indianapolis, IN
Referees: Michol Murray, Roy Gulbeyan, Angie Enlund

BTN

March 7
2:30 p.m.

No. 5 Michigan 98, No. 4 Maryland 71
Scoring by quarter: 27–6, 14–31, 28–12, 29–22
Pts: Jordan Hobbs (23); Rebs: Iuliia Grabovskaia (5); Asts: Mila Holloway (8)	Pts: Sarah Te-Biasu (25); Rebs: Mir McLean (6); Asts: Sarah Te-Biasu (3)

Gainbridge Fieldhouse
Indianapolis, IN
Attendance: 7,352
Referees: Kevin Pethtel, Nykesha Thompson, Frank Steratore

BTN

March 7
6:30 p.m.

No. 10 Nebraska 74, No. 2 UCLA 85
Scoring by quarter: 17–27, 22–14, 16–21, 19–23
Pts: Britt Prince (24); Rebs: Amiah Hargrove (5); Asts: Tied (6)	Pts: Lauren Betts (28); Rebs: Lauren Betts (13); Asts: Kiki Rice

Gainbridge Fieldhouse
Indianapolis, IN
Referees: Felicia Grinter, Chuck Gonzalez, Tim Daley

BTN

March 7
9:00 p.m.

No. 11 Iowa 59, No. 3 Ohio State 60
Scoring by quarter: 9–14, 19–15, 18–19, 13–12
Pts: Tied (14); Rebs: Hannah Stuelke (12); Asts: Lucy Olsen (7)	Pts: Cotie McMahon (18); Rebs: Ajae Petty (12); Asts: Jaloni Cambridge (5)

Gainbridge Fieldhouse
Indianapolis, IN
Attendance: 7,500
Referees: Gina Cross, Maggie Tieman, Cameron Inouye

=== Semifinals ===
BTN

March 8
3:00 p.m.

No. 5 Michigan 70, No. 1 USC 82
Scoring by quarter: 15–12, 16–17, 21–24, 18–29
Pts: Syla Swords (26); Rebs: Olivia Olson (9); Asts: Olivia Olson (4)	Pts: Kiki Iriafen (25); Rebs: Tied (11); Asts: Talia von Oelhoffen (5)

Gainbridge Fieldhouse
Indianapolis, IN

BTN

March 8
5:30 p.m.

No. 3 Ohio State 46, No. 2 UCLA 75
Scoring by quarter: 8–22, 13–22, 9–23, 16–8
Pts: Jaloni Cambridge (10); Rebs: Tied (4); Asts: Kennedy Cambridge (3)	Pts: Londynn Jones (22); Rebs: Angela Dugalić (9); Asts: Tied (6)

Gainbridge Fieldhouse
Indianapolis, IN
Attendance: 7,805
Referees: Michol Murray, Maggie Tieman, Roy Gulbeyan

=== Championship ===
CBS

March 9
4:30 p.m.

No. 2 UCLA 72, No. 1 USC 67
Scoring by quarter: 19–24, 16–21, 17–9, 20–13
Pts: Lauren Betts (17); Rebs: Janiah Barker (6); Asts: Kiki Rice (8)	Pts: JuJu Watkins (29); Rebs: Kennedy Smith (8); Asts: Kennedy Smith (5)

Gainbridge Fieldhouse
Indianapolis, IN
Attendance: 8,358
Referees: Brenda Pantoja, Maj Forsberg, Julie Krommenhoek

== All-Tournament team ==
- Lauren Betts, UCLA – Most Outstanding Player
- Kiki Iriafen, USC
- Lucy Olsen, Iowa
- Syla Swords, Michigan
- JuJu Watkins, USC

== Tournament notes ==
- An NCAA record twelve Big Ten teams were invited to the 2025 NCAA women's basketball tournament. UCLA, USC, Ohio State, Maryland, Michigan, Iowa, Michigan State, Illinois, Indiana, Nebraska, Oregon, and Washington all received bids to the 2025 tournament. Tournament Winner UCLA was the overall No. 1 seed, and USC was the No. 4 overall seed.
- Minnesota was the sole Big Ten team invited to the 2025 Women's Basketball Invitation Tournament (WBIT). The Gophers won the 2025 WBIT.
- UCLA would regain the number 1 ranking they held before being defeated by USC for the regular season championship.
- Both USC and UCLA lost to the eventual national champion UConn Huskies.
