= 2024–25 Oregon Ducks women's basketball team =

Intercollegiate basketball season

2024–25 Oregon Ducks women's basketball

NCAA tournament, Second Round
- Conference: Big Ten Conference
- Record: 20–12 (10–8 Big Ten)
- Head coach: Kelly Graves (11th season)
- Associate head coach: Jodie Berry
- Assistant coaches: Jerise Freeman; Tre Simmons
- Home arena: Matthew Knight Arena

2024–25 Big Ten women's basketball standings
	Conf.				Overall
Team	W		L	PCT	W		L	PCT
No. 5 USC	17	–	1	.944	31	–	4	.886
No. 3 UCLA †	16	–	2	.889	34	–	3	.919
No. 19 Ohio State	13	–	5	.722	26	–	7	.788
No. 12 Maryland	13	–	5	.722	25	–	8	.758
No. 25 Michigan	11	–	7	.611	23	–	11	.676
Michigan State	11	–	7	.611	22	–	10	.688
Illinois	11	–	7	.611	22	–	10	.688
Oregon	10	–	8	.556	20	–	12	.625
Indiana	10	–	8	.556	20	–	13	.606
Nebraska	10	–	8	.556	21	–	12	.636
Iowa	10	–	8	.556	23	–	11	.676
Washington	9	–	9	.500	19	–	14	.576
Minnesota	8	–	10	.444	25	–	11	.694
Wisconsin	4	–	14	.222	13	–	17	.433
Rutgers	3	–	15	.167	13	–	20	.394
Purdue	3	–	15	.167	10	–	19	.345
Northwestern	2	–	16	.111	9	–	18	.333
Penn State	1	–	17	.056	10	–	19	.345
† 2025 Big Ten tournament winner As of April 7, 2025; Rankings from AP poll

The 2024–25 Oregon Ducks women's basketball team represented the University of Oregon during the 2024-25 NCAA Division I women's basketball season. The Ducks were led by eleventh-year head coach Kelly Graves, and played their home games at Matthew Knight Arena in Eugene, Oregon as a first-year member of the Big Ten Conference.

== Previous season ==
The Ducks finished the 2023–24 season at 11–21, 2–16 in Pac-12 play, to finish in last place. As the 12th seed in the Pac-12 women's tournament, they lost to 5th seed Colorado by the score of 79–30 in the first round.

== Offseason ==
=== Departures ===
Name	Number	Pos.	Height	Year	Hometown	Reason for departure
Ula Chamberlin	0	G	5' 8"	Senior	Medford, OR	Graduated
Kennedy Basham	1	F	6' 7"	Sophomore	Phoenix, AZ	Transferred to Arizona State
Chance Gray	2	G	5' 9"	Sophomore	Cincinnati, OH	Transferred to Ohio State
Priscilla Williams	4	G	6' 2"	(redshirt) Sophomore	Branson, MO	Transferred to Jacksonville
Bella Hamel	21	G	5' 9"	Junior	Hillsboro, OR	TBD
Grace VanSlooten	40	F	6' 3"	Sophomore	Toledo, OH	Transferred to Michigan State

=== Incoming transfers ===
Name	Number	Pos.	Height	Year	Hometown	Previous school
Alexis Whitfield	1	F	6' 2"	GS Senior	West Hills, CA	UC Santa Barbara
Nani Falatea	3	G	5' 9"	Senior	Salt Lake City, UT	BYU
Amina Muhammad	5	F	6' 4"	Junior	DeSoto, TX	Texas
Elisa Mevius	8	G	5' 10"	Junior	Rendsburg, Germany	Siena
Peyton Scott	10	G	5' 8"	GS Senior	Lynchburg, OH	Miami (OH)
Salimatou Kourouma	12	G/F	5' 11"	GS Senior	Kati, Mali	Arizona
Ari Long	14	G	6' 0"	Sophomore	Moreno Valley, CA	Washington
Deja Kelly	25	G	5' 8"	GS Senior	San Antonio, TX	North Carolina

=== Recruiting class of 2024 ===
College recruiting
Name	Hometown	School	Height	Weight	Commit date
Katie Fiso; PG	Seattle, WA	Garfield High School	5 ft 11 in (1.80 m)	N/A	
Katie Fiso; PG	Recruit ratings: ESPN: (95)				
Overall recruit ranking:
Note: In many cases, Scout, Rivals, 247Sports, On3, and ESPN may conflict in their listings of height and weight.; In these cases, the average was taken. ESPN grades are on a 100-point scale.; Sources: "2024 Player Commits". ESPN. Archived from the original on November 12, 2023.

=== Recruiting class of 2025 ===
College recruiting (2025)
Name	Hometown	School	Height	Weight	Commit date
Janiyah Williams; G	Edmond, OK	Edmond Memorial High School	5 ft 10 in (1.78 m)	N/A	
Janiyah Williams; G	Recruit ratings: ESPN: (94)				
Overall recruit ranking:
Note: In many cases, Scout, Rivals, 247Sports, On3, and ESPN may conflict in their listings of height and weight.; In these cases, the average was taken. ESPN grades are on a 100-point scale.; Sources: "2025 Player Commits". ESPN. Archived from the original on November 5, 2024.

== Roster ==
2024–25 Oregon Ducks women's basketball team
Players
Coaches

Pos.	#	Name	Height	Year	Previous school	Hometown
F	1	Alexis Whitfield	6 ft 2 in (1.88 m)	GS	UC Santa Barbara	West Hills, CA
G	2	Katie Fiso	5 ft 11 in (1.8 m)	Fr	Garfield HS	Seattle, WA
G	3	Sofia Bell	6 ft 1 in (1.85 m)	So	Jesuit HS	Portland, OR
G	4	Nani Falatea	5 ft 9 in (1.75 m)	Sr	BYU	Salt Lake City, UT
F	5	Amina Muhammad	6 ft 4 in (1.93 m)	RS Jr	Texas	DeSoto, TX
G	8	Elisa Mevius	5 ft 10 in (1.78 m)	Jr	Siena	Rendsburg, Germany
G	10	Peyton Scott	5 ft 8 in (1.73 m)	GS	Miami (OH)	Lynchburg, OH
G/F	11	Sammie Wagner	6 ft 1 in (1.85 m)	RS So	Ronald Reagan HS	San Antonio, TX
F	12	Salimatou Kourouma	5 ft 11 in (1.8 m)	GS	Arizona	Kati, Mali
F	13	Filippa Tilliander	5 ft 11 in (1.8 m)	So	Norrköping Dolphins	Malmö, Sweden
G	14	Ari Long	6 ft 0 in (1.83 m)	So	Washington	Moreno Valley, CA
C	15	Phillipina Kyei	6 ft 8 in (2.03 m)	Sr	Crestwood Prep	Calgary, AB
F	23	Sarah Rambus	6 ft 3 in (1.91 m)	So	IMG Academy	Flint, MI
G	25	Deja Kelly	5 ft 8 in (1.73 m)	GS	North Carolina	San Antonio, TX
F	35	Ehis Etute	6 ft 0 in (1.83 m)	Fr	T71 Dudelange	Dudelange, Luxembourg

Head coach

- Kelly Graves (New Mexico)

Assistant coach(es)

- Jodie Berry (Western Washington)
- Jerise Freeman (Pacific)
- Tre Simmons (Washington)

Legend

- (C) Team captain
- (S) Suspended
- (I) Ineligible
- (W) Walk-on
- Injured
- Current redshirt

Roster

== Schedule and results ==
Date time, TV	Rank^{#}	Opponent^{#}	Result	Record	High points	High rebounds	High assists	Site (attendance) city, state
Exhibition
November 1, 2024*; 6:00 p.m., B1G+		Warner Pacific	W 110–21		18 – Mevius	8 – Etute	–	Matthew Knight Arena (4,152); Eugene, OR
Regular season
November 4, 2024*; 4:00 p.m., B1G+		California Baptist	W 93–63	1–0	16 – Scott	8 – Whitfield	8 – Kelly	Matthew Knight Arena (4,141); Eugene, OR
November 6, 2024*; 7:00 p.m., B1G+		Nevada	W 76–58	2–0	21 – Kelly	7 – Muhammad	3 – tied	Matthew Knight Arena (4,253); Eugene, OR
November 10, 2024*; 7:00 p.m., BTN		No. 12 Baylor	W 76–74	3–0	20 – Kelly	9 – Kelly	6 – Mevius	Matthew Knight Arena (6,372); Eugene, OR
November 12, 2024*; 11:00 a.m., B1G+	No. 25	North Texas	W 66–35	4–0	11 – tied	7 – Mevius	4 – Scott	Matthew Knight Arena (4,344); Eugene, OR
November 18, 2024*; 6:00 p.m., B1G+	No. 23	Grand Canyon	W 70–54	5–0	17 – Scott	11 – Kelly	4 – Kelly	Matthew Knight Arena (4,518); Eugene, OR
November 20, 2024*; 6:00 p.m., B1G+	No. 23	Auburn	W 70–68	6–0	14 – Kyei	11 – Kyei	6 – Kelly	Matthew Knight Arena (5,067); Eugene, OR
November 25, 2024*; 4:00 p.m., BallerTV	No. 21	vs. Georgia Tech; Hawaii North Shore Showcase	L 58–74	6–1	10 – Kelly	8 – Kyei	2 – tied	George Q. Cannon Activities Center (1,800); Lāʻie, HI
November 26, 2024*; 4:00 p.m., BallerTV	No. 21	vs. South Dakota State; Hawaii North Shore Showcase	L 70–75	6–2	19 – Kelly	8 – Muhammad	2 – tied	George Q. Cannon Activities Center; Lāʻie, HI
December 4, 2024*; 6:00 p.m., B1G+		Washington State	W 85–70	7–2	23 – Scott	10 – Kyei	6 – Mevius	Matthew Knight Arena (4,756); Eugene, OR
December 7, 2024; 1:00 p.m., BTN		No. 6 USC	L 53–66	7–3 (0–1)	16 – Kelly	7 – Kyei	2 – tied	Matthew Knight Arena (7,246); Eugene, OR
December 17, 2024*; 6:00 p.m., B1G+		Air Force	W 98–36	8–3	14 – Kyei	8 – Kelly	8 – Mevius	Matthew Knight Arena (4,551); Eugene, OR
December 19, 2024*; 6:00 p.m., B1G+		UC Irvine	W 71–43	9–3	11 – Fiso	9 – Kyei	6 – Kelly	Matthew Knight Arena (4,508); Eugene, OR
December 28, 2024; 12:00 p.m., B1G+		at Illinois	L 59–64	9–4 (0–2)	17 – Falatea	6 – Etute	1 – tied	State Farm Center (4,914); Champaign, IL
December 31, 2024; 12:00 p.m., BTN		at Northwestern	W 85–65	10–4 (1–2)	14 – Scott	9 – Kyei	8 – Kelly	Welsh–Ryan Arena (1,377); Evanston, IL
January 4, 2025; 12:30 p.m., BTN		Wisconsin	W 68–52	11–4 (2–2)	14 – Mevius	6 – Kelly	4 – Kelly	Matthew Knight Arena (5,847); Eugene, OR
January 9, 2025; 3:00 p.m., B1G+		at Penn State	W 63–61	12–4 (3–2)	15 – Kelly	8 – Kyei	5 – Mevius	Bryce Jordan Center (1,701); State College, PA
January 12, 2025; 10:00 a.m., B1G+		at No. 9 Ohio State	L 60–69	12–5 (3–3)	11 – tied	8 – tied	3 – tied	Value City Arena (8,664); Columbus, OH
January 15, 2025; 6:00 p.m., B1G+		Purdue	W 69–53	13–5 (4–3)	15 – Kelly	9 – Kyei	6 – Mevius	Matthew Knight Arena (4,944); Eugene, OR
January 19, 2025; 2:00 p.m., B1G+		Iowa	W 50–49	14–5 (5–3)	12 – Kyei	6 – Kelly	3 – tied	Matthew Knight Arena (7,307); Eugene, OR
January 24, 2025; 6:00 p.m., B1G+		Indiana	W 54–47	15–5 (6–3)	14 – Scott	8 – Etute	5 – Kelly	Matthew Knight Arena (5,572); Eugene, OR
January 30, 2025; 3:00 p.m., BTN		at No. 16 Michigan State	W 63–59	16–5 (7–3)	12 – Scott	10 – Kyei	5 – Tied	Breslin Center (3,521); East Lansing, MI
February 2, 2025; 9:00 a.m., B1G+		at Michigan	L 48–80	16–6 (7–4)	11 – Tied	8 – Kyei	3 – Kyei	Crisler Center (4,306); Ann Arbor, MI
February 6, 2025; 6:00 p.m., FS1		No. 16 Maryland	L 61–79	16–7 (7–5)	14 – Etute	7 – Etute	3 – Falatea	Matthew Knight Arena (5,156); Eugene, OR
February 9, 2025; 1:00 p.m., B1G+		No. 1 UCLA	L 52–62	16–8 (7–6)	19 – Falatea	7 – Muhammad	3 – Kyei	Matthew Knight Arena (6,534); Eugene, OR
February 12, 2025; 6:00 p.m., B1G+		Washington	W 68–67	17–8 (8–6)	21 – Kelly	5 – Tied	4 – Falatea	Matthew Knight Arena (4,720); Eugene, OR
February 16, 2025; 12:00 p.m., B1G+		at Minnesota	W 76–70	18–8 (9–6)	20 – Kelly	8 – Kyei	7 – Kelly	Williams Arena (6,487); Minneapolis, MN
February 19, 2025; 5:00 p.m., B1G+		at Nebraska	L 90–94 ^{OT}	18–9 (9–7)	22 – Kelly	9 – Kyei	6 – Kelly	Pinnacle Bank Arena (5,257); Lincoln, NE
February 23, 2025; 2:00 p.m., B1G+		Rutgers	W 77–58	19–9 (10–7)	20 – Kyei	25 – Kyei	3 – Tied	Matthew Knight Arena (6,181); Eugene, OR
March 2, 2025; 2:00 p.m., B1G+		at Washington	L 56–64	19–10 (10–8)	22 – Kelly	7 – Etute	3 – Scott	Alaska Airlines Arena (4,813); Seattle, WA
Big Ten women's tournament
March 6, 2025; 9:00 a.m., BTN	(8)	vs. (9) Indiana; Second round	L 62–78	19–11	16 – Scott	8 – Scott	5 – Kelly	Gainbridge Fieldhouse; Indianapolis, IN
NCAA Tournament
March 21, 2025*; 2:30 p.m., ESPNews	(10 B2)	vs. (7 B2) Vanderbilt; First Round	W 77–73 ^{OT}	20–11	20 – Kelly	9 – Kyei	5 – Scott	Cameron Indoor Stadium; Durham, NC
March 23, 2025*; 9:00 a.m., ESPN	(10 B2)	at (2 B2) No. 7 Duke; Second Round	L 53–59	20–12	20 – Kelly	3 – Kyei	1 – tied	Cameron Indoor Stadium (3,461); Durham, NC
*Non-conference game. ^{#}Rankings from AP poll. (#) Tournament seedings in parentheses. B2=Birmingham 2. All times are in Pacific.

== Rankings ==
Ranking movements Legend: ██ Increase in ranking ██ Decrease in ranking — = Not ranked RV = Received votes
	Week																				
Poll	Pre	1	2	3	4	5	6	7	8	9	10	11	12	13	14	15	16	17	18	19	Final
AP	—	25	23	21	RV	—	—	—	—	—	—	—	—	—	—	—	—	—	—	—	
Coaches	—	RV	25	RV	—	—	—	—	—	—	—	—	—	—	—	—	—	—	—	—	

== See also ==
- 2024–25 Oregon Ducks men's basketball team
