= 2024–25 Georgetown Hoyas women's basketball team =

American college basketball season

2024–25 Georgetown Hoyas women's basketball
- Conference: Big East Conference
- Record: 12–19 (4–14 Big East)
- Head coach: Darnell Haney (2nd season)
- Assistant coaches: Kelly Mazzante; Mariya Moore; Eric Lindsey
- Home arena: McDonough Arena

2024–25 Big East women's basketball standings
| | Conf. | | | | Overall |
| Team | W | | L | PCT | W | | L | PCT |
|---|---|---|---|---|---|---|---|---|
| No. 1 UConn † | 18 | – | 0 | 1.000 | 37 | – | 3 | .925 |
| No. 23 Creighton | 16 | – | 2 | .889 | 26 | – | 7 | .788 |
| Seton Hall | 13 | – | 5 | .722 | 23 | – | 10 | .697 |
| Marquette | 12 | – | 6 | .667 | 21 | – | 11 | .656 |
| Villanova | 11 | – | 7 | .611 | 21 | – | 15 | .583 |
| DePaul | 8 | – | 10 | .444 | 13 | – | 19 | .406 |
| Providence | 6 | – | 12 | .333 | 13 | – | 19 | .406 |
| St. John's | 5 | – | 13 | .278 | 16 | – | 15 | .516 |
| Butler | 5 | – | 13 | .278 | 16 | – | 18 | .471 |
| Georgetown | 4 | – | 14 | .222 | 12 | – | 19 | .387 |
| Xavier | 1 | – | 17 | .056 | 7 | – | 24 | .226 |
† 2025 Big East tournament winner Rankings from AP poll

The 2024–25 Georgetown Hoyas women's basketball team represented Georgetown University during the 2024–25 NCAA Division I women's basketball season. The Hoyas, led by second-year head coach Darnell Haney, played their home games at McDonough Arena in Washington, D.C. as a member of the Big East Conference.

== Previous season ==
The Hoyas finished the 2023–24 season 23–12, 9–9 in Big East play to finish in sixth place. They defeated Xavier in the first round of the Big East women's basketball tournament, St. John's in the quarterfinals and Creighton in the semifinals before losing in the championship game to UConn in the championship game. They received an at-large bid to the WBIT, where they defeated Washington in the first round before losing in the second round to Tulsa.

== Offseason ==
=== Departures ===
Georgetown departures
| Name | Num | Pos. | Height | Year | Hometown | Reason for departure |
|---|---|---|---|---|---|---|
| Yasmin Ott | 0 | G | 5'7" | Senior | Little Rock, AR | Transferred to UMBC |
| Teaghan Flaherty | 2 | G | 5'10" | Senior | Rye, NY | Graduated |
| Alex Cowan | 4 | G | 5'7" | Graduate student | Bowie, MD | Graduated |
| Mya Bembry | 10 | F | 6'1" | Graduate student | West Orange, NJ | Graduated |
| Mayla Ham | 24 | F | 5'11" | Freshman | Detroit, MI | Transferred to Central Michigan |
| Graceann Bennett | 33 | F | 6'3" | Graduate student | Lake George, NY | Graduated |
| Jada Claude | 35 | F | 6'0" | Senior | Fayetteville, GA | Graduated |

=== Incoming transfers ===
Georgetown incoming transfers
| Name | Num | Pos. | Height | Year | Hometown | Previous school |
|---|---|---|---|---|---|---|
| Chet Nweke | 4 | G | 6'0" | Graduate student | Woodbine, MD | Princeton |
| Siobhan Ryan | 32 | G | 6'0" | Graduate student | Buffalo, NY | Richmond |

==== Recruiting ====
There was no recruiting class of 2024.

== Roster ==
2024–25 Georgetown Hoyas women's basketball team
Players
Coaches

| Pos. | # | Name | Height | Year | Previous school | Hometown |
|---|---|---|---|---|---|---|
| G | 0 | Jaeda Wilson | 5 ft 8 in (1.73 m) | Fr | Connelly School of the Holy Child | Potomac, Maryland |
| G | 1 | Kelsey Ransom | 5 ft 10 in (1.78 m) | GS | Bishop Ahr High School | South River, New Jersey |
| G | 2 | Jayden McBride | 5 ft 10 in (1.78 m) | Fr | Cathedral Prep | Erie, Pennsylvania |
| G | 3 | Victoria Rivera | 6 ft 0 in (1.83 m) | Jr | Dobie High School | Pasadena, Texas |
| G | 4 | Chetanna Nweke | 6 ft 0 in (1.83 m) | GS | Princeton | Woodbine, Maryland |
| G | 5 | Modesti McConnell | 5 ft 7 in (1.7 m) | Jr | Casady School | Edmond, Oklahoma |
| G | 7 | Alexia Araujo-Dagba | 6 ft 1 in (1.85 m) | Fr | Escola Santa Emília | Recife-PE, Brazil |
| G | 8 | Khadee Hession | 5 ft 9 in (1.75 m) | Fr | St. Thomas Aquinas High School | Miami, Florida |
| G | 10 | Amanda Ajobiewe | 5 ft 9 in (1.75 m) | Fr | Ontario Christian High School | Riverside, California |
| F | 15 | Brianna Scott | 6 ft 4 in (1.93 m) | Sr | South Lakes High School | Reston, Virginia |
| C | 21 | Ariel Jenkins | 6 ft 3 in (1.91 m) | Sr | Stuart Country Day School | Piscataway, New Jersey |
| F | 25 | Kaliyah Myricks | 6 ft 2 in (1.88 m) | Sr | George School | Hammonton, New Jersey |
| G | 32 | Siobhan Ryan | 6 ft 0 in (1.83 m) | GS | Richmond | Buffalo, New York |

Head coach

- Darnell Haney (Florida A&M)

Assistant coach(es)

- Kelly Mazzante (Penn State)
- Mariya Moore (USC)
- Eric Lindsey (Washington Adventist)

Legend

- (C) Team captain
- (S) Suspended
- (I) Ineligible
- (W) Walk-on
- Injured
- Current redshirt

Roster

== Schedule and results ==
| Date time, TV | Rank^{#} | Opponent^{#} | Result | Record | High points | High rebounds | High assists | Site (attendance) city, state |
Regular season
| November 6, 2024*; 4:30 p.m., FloSports | | Virginia–Lynchburg | W 88–31 | 1–0 | 19 – Rivera | 10 – Tied | 9 – Hession | McDonough Arena (733); Washington, D.C. |
| November 10, 2024*; 5:00 p.m., B1G+ | | at Wisconsin | L 61–79 | 1–1 | 27 – Ransom | 7 – Ransom | 2 – Tied | Kohl Center (3,452); Madison, WI |
| November 19, 2024*; 4:30 p.m., FloSports | | Temple | W 65–51 | 2–1 | 28 – Ransom | 11 – Jenkins | 5 – Ransom | McDonough Arena (743); Washington, D.C. |
| November 22, 2024*; 5:00 p.m., ESPN+ | | vs. Cincinnati; Atlantic Slam W | L 57–59 | 2–2 | 29 – Ransom | 12 – Jenkins | 6 – Ransom | Eastlink Centre (902); Charlottetown, PE |
| November 23, 2024*; 5:00 p.m., ESPN+ | | vs. Florida Gulf Coast; Atlantic Slam W | L 57–66 | 2–3 | 22 – Jenkins | 9 – Jenkins | 3 – Ryan | Eastlink Centre (1,026); Charlottetown, PE |
| November 27, 2024*; 12:00 p.m., ESPN+ | | at Boston University | W 69–61 | 3–3 | 18 – McBride | 8 – Jenkins | 8 – Ransom | Case Gym (594); Boston, MA |
| December 1, 2024*; 2:00 p.m., ESPN+ | | at Howard | W 69–63 | 4–3 | 28 – Ransom | 12 – Jenkins | 6 – Ransom | Burr Gymnasium (1,080); Washington, D.C. |
| December 4, 2024*; 6:00 p.m., ESPN+ | | at Richmond | W 55–53 | 5–3 | 21 – Ransom | 7 – Jenkins | 4 – Ransom | Robins Center (801); Richmond, VA |
| December 7, 2024*; 4:00 p.m., RyzSN | | vs. Colgate; Coaches vs Racism Roundball Classic | W 71–57 | 6–3 | 21 – Rivera | 12 – Jenkins | 4 – Wilson | Entertainment and Sports Arena; Washington, D.C. |
| December 9, 2024*; 7:00 p.m., FloSports | | George Mason | L 55–63 | 6–4 | 28 – Ransom | 16 – Jenkins | 5 – Rivera | McDonough Arena (385); Washington, D.C. |
| December 15, 2024; 1:30 p.m., SNY | | at No. 2 UConn | L 44–79 | 6–5 (0–1) | 12 – Jenkins | 9 – Jenkins | 3 – Tied | XL Center (15,684); Hartford, CT |
| December 28, 2024*; 7:00 p.m., FloSports | | Maryland Eastern Shore | W 78–68 | 7–5 | 29 – Ransom | 7 – Jenkins | 7 – Ransom | McDonough Arena; Washington, D.C. |
| December 30, 2024; 7:00 p.m., FloSports | | Xavier | W 64–41 | 8–5 (1–1) | 22 – Jenkins | 14 – Jenkins | 5 – Ransom | McDonough Arena (629); Washington, D.C. |
| January 4, 2025; 1:00 p.m., FloSports | | at Seton Hall | L 71–74 ^{OT} | 8–6 (1–2) | 26 – Rivera | 16 – Jenkins | 7 – Ransom | Walsh Gymnasium (847); South Orange, NJ |
| January 8, 2025; 7:00 p.m., FloSports | | Villanova | L 62–77 | 8–7 (1–3) | 35 – Ransom | 5 – Myricks | 3 – Hession | McDonough Arena (219); Washington, D.C. |
| January 11, 2024; 4:00 p.m., SNY | | No. 7 UConn | L 55–73 | 8–8 (1–4) | 22 – Hession | 8 – Ransom | 4 – Ransom | Entertainment and Sports Arena (3,827); Washington, D.C. |
| January 14, 2025; 7:00 p.m., FloSports | | at Butler | L 53–63 | 8–9 (1–5) | 15 – Hession | 9 – Jenkins | 3 – Wilson | Hinkle Fieldhouse (742); Indianapolis, IN |
| January 18, 2025; 2:00 p.m., FloSports | | at Providence | W 60–48 | 9–9 (2–5) | 19 – Rivera | 12 – Jenkins | 3 – Tied | Alumni Hall (1,184); Providence, RI |
| January 22, 2025; 7:00 p.m., FloSports | | St. John's | W 56–54 | 10–9 (3–5) | 28 – Ranson | 12 – Jenkins | 3 – Myricks | McDonough Arena (693); Washington, D.C. |
| January 25, 2025; 3:00 p.m., FloSports | | at Marquette | L 58–75 | 10–10 (3–6) | 25 – Ransom | 10 – Jenkins | 5 – Rivera | Al McGuire Center (1,962); Milwaukee, WI |
| January 29, 2025; 2:00 p.m., FloSports | | Creighton | L 70–84 | 10–11 (3–7) | 20 – Ransom | 8 – Ransom | 4 – Ransom | McDonough Arena (313); Washington, D.C. |
| February 5, 2025; 2:00 p.m., FloSports | | at Xavier | W 63–36 | 11–11 (4–7) | 16 – Tied | 13 – Jenkins | 3 – Tied | Cintas Center (1,123); Cincinnati, OH |
| February 9, 2025; 2:00 p.m., FloSports | | DePaul | L 76–80 | 11–12 (4–8) | 18 – Ransom | 5 – Tied | 5 – Ransom | McDonough Arena; Washington, D.C. |
| February 12, 2025; 11:00 a.m., FloSports | | Butler | L 70–76 | 11–13 (4–9) | 19 – Ransom | 11 – Jenkins | 4 – Ransom | McDonough Arena (119); Washington, D.C. |
| February 15, 2025; 4:00 p.m., FS1 | | at No. 24 Creighton | L 48–70 | 11–14 (4–10) | 20 – Ransom | 13 – Jenkins | 4 – Ransom | D. J. Sokol Arena (1,682); Omaha, NE |
| February 19, 2025; 7:00 p.m., FloSports | | at Villanova | L 65–70 | 11–15 (4–11) | 25 – Ransom | 11 – Jenkins | 4 – Ransom | Finneran Pavilion (1,049); Villanova, PA |
| February 22, 2025; 7:00 p.m., FloSports | | Marquette | L 50–55 | 11–16 (4–12) | 22 – Ransom | 11 – Jenkins | 2 – McBride | McDonough Arena (1,363); Washington, D.C. |
| February 26, 2025; 7:00 p.m., FloSports | | at St. John's | L 49–83 | 11–17 (4–13) | 14 – Ransom | 11 – Jenkins | 4 – Ransom | Carnesecca Arena (733); Queens, NY |
| March 1, 2025; 12:00 p.m., FS1 | | Providence | L 62–66 | 11–18 (4–14) | 26 – Ransom | 10 – Ransom | 2 – Tied | McDonough Arena (617); Washington, D.C. |
Big East tournament
| March 7, 2025; 1:30 p.m., BEDN | (10) | vs. (7) Providence; First Round | W 58–56 | 12–18 | 36 – Ransom | 8 – Hession | 4 – Hession | Mohegan Sun Arena; Uncasville, CT |
| March 8, 2025; 7:00 p.m., FS2 | (10) | vs. (2) No. 23 Creighton; Quarterfinals | L 70–72 | 12–19 | 20 – Ransom | 11 – Jenkins | 10 – Ransom | Mohegan Sun Arena; Uncasville, CT |
*Non-conference game. ^{#}Rankings from AP Poll. (#) Tournament seedings in parentheses. All times are in Eastern.
