= 2024–25 DePaul Blue Demons women's basketball team =

American college basketball season

2024–25 DePaul Blue Demons women's basketball
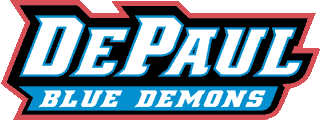
- Conference: Big East Conference
- Record: 13–19 (8–10 Big East)
- Head coach: Doug Bruno (39th season)
- Associate head coach: Jill Pizzotti
- Assistant coaches: Ashton Millender; Bradley Bruno
- Home arena: Wintrust Arena

2024–25 Big East women's basketball standings
	Conf.				Overall
Team	W		L	PCT	W		L	PCT
No. 1 UConn †	18	–	0	1.000	37	–	3	.925
No. 23 Creighton	16	–	2	.889	26	–	7	.788
Seton Hall	13	–	5	.722	23	–	10	.697
Marquette	12	–	6	.667	21	–	11	.656
Villanova	11	–	7	.611	21	–	15	.583
DePaul	8	–	10	.444	13	–	19	.406
Providence	6	–	12	.333	13	–	19	.406
St. John's	5	–	13	.278	16	–	15	.516
Butler	5	–	13	.278	16	–	18	.471
Georgetown	4	–	14	.222	12	–	19	.387
Xavier	1	–	17	.056	7	–	24	.226
† 2025 Big East tournament winner Rankings from AP poll

The 2024–25 DePaul Blue Demons women's basketball team represented DePaul University during the 2024–25 NCAA Division I women's basketball season. The Blue Demons were led by 39-year head coach Doug Bruno and played their home games at the Wintrust Arena as members of the Big East Conference.

== Previous season ==
The Blue Demons finished the season 12–20, 4–14 in Big East play to finish in tenth place. As a No. 10 seed, they lost in the first round to Seton Hall of the Big East women's tournament.

== Offseason ==
=== Departures ===
DePaul departures
Name	Num	Pos.	Height	Year	Hometown	Reason for departure
Katlyn Gilbert	0	G	5'10"	Graduate student	Indianapolis, IN	Graduated
Brynn Masikewich	5	F	6'3"	Graduate student	Calgary, AB	Graduated
Jade Edwards	12	G	5'9"	Graduate student	Chicago, IL	Graduated
Anaya Peoples	22	G	5'11"	Graduate student	Danville, IL	Graduated
Michelle Sidor	23	G	5'9"	Graduate student	Upper Saddle River, NJ	Graduated

=== Incoming transfers ===
DePaul incoming transfers
Name	Num	Pos.	Height	Year	Hometown	Previous school
Taylor Johnson-Matthews	0	G/F	5'10"	Junior	Cleveland, OH	Pearl River CC
Meg Newman	9	F	6'3"	(redshirt) Junior	Indianapolis, IN	Alabama

==== Recruiting ====
There was no recruiting class of 2024.

== Roster ==
2024–25 DePaul Blue Demons women's basketball team
Players
Coaches

Pos.	#	Name	Height	Year	Previous school	Hometown
G	0	Taylor Johnson-Matthews	5 ft 9 in (1.75 m)	Jr	Charles F. Brush; Pearl River CC	Cleveland, OH
G	2	Grace Carstensen	5 ft 11 in (1.8 m)	So	Nazareth Academy	Hinsdale, IL
G/F	3	Charlece Ohiaeri	6 ft 0 in (1.83 m)	So	Centennial	Las Vegas, NV
G	5	Alayna West	5 ft 10 in (1.78 m)	Fr	Madison La Follette	Madison, WI
F	9	Meg Newman	6 ft 3 in (1.91 m)	RS Jr	North Central; Alabama	Indianapolis, IN
G	10	Haley Walker	5 ft 8 in (1.73 m)	RS So	Rice Memorial	Burlington, VT
G	11	Sumer Lee	5 ft 8 in (1.73 m)	So	King's Christian	Toronto, ON
G/F	12	Ellery Minch	6 ft 3 in (1.91 m)	Fr	Mount Vernon	McCordsville, IN
G	13	Maeve McErlane	5 ft 10 in (1.78 m)	Jr	Notre Dame	Philadelphia, PA
G	20	Shakara McCline	5 ft 6 in (1.68 m)	So	East St. Louis	East St. Louis, IL
G	21	Natiah Nelson	5 ft 9 in (1.75 m)	Fr	Africentric Early College	Perrysburg, OH
G	24	Ally Timm	5 ft 10 in (1.78 m)	Fr	Divine Savior Holy Angels	Menomonee Falls, WI
G	25	Kate Clarke	6 ft 1 in (1.85 m)	Jr	Carmel; Michigan	Carmel, IN
G	30	Angelina Smith	5 ft 8 in (1.73 m)	Fr	Bolingbrook	Bolingbrook, IL
F	33	Jorie Allen	6 ft 1 in (1.85 m)	GS	North Lawrence; Indiana	Bedford, IN
G	35	Emory Klatt	5 ft 10 in (1.78 m)	Fr	Stevenson	Kildeer, IL

Head coach

- Doug Bruno (DePaul)

Assistant coach(es)

- Jill Pizzotti (Southeast Missouri State)
- Ashton Millender (DePaul)
- Bradley Bruno (DePaul)

Legend

- (C) Team captain
- (S) Suspended
- (I) Ineligible
- (W) Walk-on
- Injured
- Current redshirt

Roster

== Schedule and results ==
Date time, TV	Rank^{#}	Opponent^{#}	Result	Record	High points	High rebounds	High assists	Site (attendance) city, state
Exhibition
October 18, 2024*; 8:00 p.m.		Lewis	W 99–48		19 – Allen	13 – Allen	5 – Newman	Wintrust Arena (658); Chicago, IL
October 28, 2024*; 7:00 p.m.		Winona State	W 73–58		25 – Allen	10 – Newman	7 – Newman	Wintrust Arena (1,032); Chicago, IL
Non-conference regular season
November 6, 2024*; 11:00 a.m., FloSports		Mercyhurst	W 74–53	1–0	21 – Allen	11 – Walker	3 – Allen	Wintrust Arena (5,057); Chicago, IL
November 9, 2024*; 1:00 p.m., FloSports		Princeton	L 58–79	1–1	19 – Allen	9 – Newman	4 – Tied	Wintrust Arena (1,233); Chicago, IL
November 12, 2024*; 7:00 p.m., Marquee		at Loyola Chicago	W 75–60	2–1	16 – Tied	8 – Allen	4 – Tied	Joseph J. Gentile Arena (616); Chicago, IL
November 17, 2024*; 7:00 p.m., FS2		No. 4 Texas	L 61–91	2–2	23 – Allen	5 – Newman	3 – Allen	Wintrust Arena (1,725); Chicago, IL
November 21, 2024*; 6:00 p.m., ESPN+		at Green Bay	L 57–70	2–3	21 – Allen	8 – Newman	3 – Lee	Kress Events Center (1,869); Green Bay, WI
November 25, 2024*; 4:30 p.m., FloSports		vs. No. 8 Oklahoma; Ball Dawgs Classic semifinals	L 62–85	2–4	15 – Tied	7 – Newman	6 – Allen	Lee's Family Forum; Henderson, NV
November 27, 2024*; 1:00 p.m., FloSports		vs. No. 9 Kansas State; Ball Dawgs Classic 3rd place game	L 66–92	2–5	17 – Tied	7 – Smith	4 – Allen	Lee's Family Forum; Henderson, NV
December 1, 2024*; 2:00 p.m., Marquee		SIU Edwardsville	W 66–42	3–5	21 – Allen	9 – Allen	4 – Lee	Wintrust Arena (1,118); Chicago, IL
December 4, 2024*; 7:00 p.m., B1G+		at Northwestern	L 56–64	3–6	20 – Johnson-Matthews	10 – Newman	4 – Allen	Welsh–Ryan Arena (1,045); Evanston, IL
December 8, 2024*; 1:00 p.m., B1G+		at No. 24 Michigan State	L 61–89	3–7	15 – Tied	11 – Allen	7 – Allen	Breslin Center (3,416); East Lansing, MI
December 13, 2024*; 7:00 p.m., Marquee		UIC	W 73–56	4–7	27 – Allen	8 – Tied	5 – Newman	Wintrust Arena (1,118); Chicago, IL
December 15, 2024*; 2:00 p.m., Marquee		UNLV	L 61–80	4–8	21 – Allen	10 – Newman	4 – Lee	Wintrust Arena (1,547); Chicago, IL
December 17, 2024*; 7:00 p.m., Marquee		Southern	W 76–64	5–8	23 – Allen	9 – Allen	8 – Lee	Wintrust Arena (900); Chicago, IL
Big East regular season
December 21, 2024; 2:00 p.m., FloSports		Butler	W 66–43	6–8 (1–0)	22 – Johnson-Matthews	10 – Allen	7 – Allen	Wintrust Arena (1,300); Chicago, IL
December 29, 2024; 2:00 p.m., FloSports		Marquette	L 59–78	6–9 (1–1)	24 – Allen	10 – Johnson-Matthews	6 – Johnson-Matthews	Wintrust Arena (1,798); Chicago, IL
January 2, 2025; 6:00 p.m., FloSports		at Xavier	W 65–60	7–9 (2–1)	20 – Kanerva	9 – Christie	7 – Kanerva	Cintas Center (1,118); Cincinnati, OH
January 7, 2025; 7:30 p.m., FS1		at St. John's	W 67–60	8–9 (3–1)	23 – Johnson-Matthews	10 – Newman	6 – Allen	Carnesecca Arena (676); Queens, NY
January 12, 2025; 2:00 p.m., FloSports		Providence	W 62–56	9–9 (4–1)	21 – Johnson-Matthews	10 – Newman	6 – Lee	Wintrust Arena (1,462); Chicago, IL
January 15, 2025; 10:30 a.m., FloSports		at Villanova	L 55–66	9–10 (4–2)	20 – Allen	7 – McCline	4 – Johnson-Matthews	Finneran Pavilion (1,219); Villanova, PA
January 18, 2025; 1:00 p.m., FloSports		at Creighton	L 71–92	9–11 (4–3)	22 – Allen	5 – Tied	5 – Allen	D. J. Sokol Arena (1,321); Omaha, NE
January 22, 2025; 7:00 p.m., FloSports		Xavier	W 57–50	10–11 (5–3)	15 – Clarke	8 – Newman	7 – Allen	Wintrust Arena (898); Chicago, IL
January 26, 2025; 1:00 p.m., FloSports		at Butler	W 74–67 ^{OT}	11–11 (6–3)	34 – Allen	9 – Newman	5 – Allen	Hinkle Fieldhouse (2,018); Indianapolis, IN
January 29, 2025; 6:00 p.m., SNY		No. 6 UConn	L 58–84	11–12 (6–4)	19 – Tied	6 – Newman	5 – McCline	Wintrust Arena (8,305); Chicago, IL
February 1, 2025; 2:00 p.m., FloSports		Seton Hall	L 55–72	11–13 (6–5)	26 – Johnson-Matthews	10 – Newman	6 – Allen	Wintrust Arena (1,354); Chicago, IL
February 6, 2025; 6:00 p.m., FloSports		at Providence	L 63–76	11–14 (6–6)	19 – Tied	12 – Newman	3 – Tied	Alumni Hall (795); Providence, RI
February 9, 2025; 1:00 p.m., FloSports		at Georgetown	W 80–76	12–14 (7–6)	31 – Allen	9 – Johnson-Matthews	4 – Lee	McDonough Arena; Washington, D.C.
February 12, 2025; 7:00 p.m., FloSports		Villanova	L 56–62	12–15 (7–7)	23 – Allen	7 – Tied	6 – Lee	Wintrust Arena (1,209); Chicago, IL
February 15, 2025; 2:00 p.m., FloSports		at Marquette	L 72–82	12–16 (7–8)	22 – Allen	8 – Walker	3 – Tied	Al McGuire Center (2,512); Milwaukee, WI
February 23, 2025; 2:00 p.m., FloSports		No. 23 Creighton	L 74–83	12–17 (7–9)	28 – Jensen	7 – Maly	5 – Mogensen	Wintrust Arena (2,559); Chicago, IL
February 27, 2025; 6:00 p.m., FloSports		at Seton Hall	L 67–76	12–18 (7–10)	21 – Allen	13 – Newman	4 – Lee	Walsh Gymnasium (1,101); South Orange, NJ
March 2, 2025; 2:00 p.m., FloSports		St. John's	W 65–64 ^{OT}	13–18 (8–10)	17 – Allen	9 – Newman	5 – Clarke	Wintrust Arena (2,985); Chicago, IL
Big East Women's Tournament
March 7, 2025; 3:00 p.m., BEDN	(6)	vs. (11) Xavier; First Round	L 73–80	13–19	28 – Allen	12 – Allen	6 – McCline	Mohegan Sun Arena; Uncasville, CT
*Non-conference game. ^{#}Rankings from AP Poll. (#) Tournament seedings in parentheses. All times are in Central Time.

== Rankings ==
Ranking movements
	Week																				
Poll	Pre	1	2	3	4	5	6	7	8	9	10	11	12	13	14	15	16	17	18	19	Final
AP		*																			Not released
Coaches																					

*The preseason and week 1 polls were the same.

== See also ==
- 2024–25 DePaul Blue Demons men's basketball team
