= 2025 Big East women's basketball tournament =

- Classification: Division I
- Season: 2024–25
- Teams: 11
- Site: Mohegan Sun Arena; Uncasville, Connecticut
- Champions: UConn (23rd title)
- Winning coach: Geno Auriemma
- MVP: Paige Bueckers (UConn)
- Television: Fox, FS1, FS2, FloSports

2024–25 Big East women's basketball standings
	Conf.				Overall
Team	W		L	PCT	W		L	PCT
No. 3 UConn †	18	–	0	1.000	31	–	3	.912
No. 23 Creighton	16	–	2	.889	26	–	6	.813
Seton Hall	13	–	5	.722	22	–	9	.710
Marquette	12	–	6	.667	20	–	10	.667
Villanova	11	–	7	.611	18	–	14	.563
DePaul	8	–	10	.444	13	–	19	.406
Providence	6	–	12	.333	13	–	19	.406
St. John's	5	–	13	.278	16	–	15	.516
Butler	5	–	13	.278	15	–	17	.469
Georgetown	4	–	14	.222	12	–	19	.387
Xavier	1	–	17	.056	7	–	24	.226
† 2025 Big East tournament winner As of March 10, 2025; Rankings from AP poll

The 2025 Big East women's basketball tournament was the postseason women's basketball tournament for the Big East Conference, held from March 7–10, 2025 at the Mohegan Sun Arena in Uncasville, Connecticut. The winner, UConn, received their 23rd of the conference's automatic bid to the 2025 NCAA tournament.

== Seeds ==
All 11 Big East schools participated in the tournament. Teams were seeded by the conference record with tie-breaking procedures to determine the seeds for teams with identical conference records. The top five teams received first-round byes. Seeding for the tournament was determined at the close of the conference regular season.

Seed	School	Conference	Tiebreaker
1	UConn	18–0	
2	Creighton	16–2	
3	Seton Hall	13–5	
4	Marquette	12–6	
5	Villanova	11–7	
6	DePaul	8–10	
7	Providence	6–12	
8	St. John's	5–13	1–0 vs. Butler
9	Butler	5–13	0–1 vs. St. John's
10	Georgetown	4–14	
11	Xavier	1–17	

== Schedule ==
Game	Time	Matchup	Score	Television	Attendance
First round – Friday, March 7
1	11:00 a.m.	No. 8 St. John's vs. No. 9 Butler	66–50	BEDN	
2	1:30 p.m.	No. 7 Providence vs. No. 10 Georgetown	56–58	BEDN	
3	4:00 p.m.	No. 6 DePaul vs. No. 11 Xavier	73–80	BEDN	
Quarterfinals – Saturday, March 8
4	12:00 p.m.	No. 1 UConn vs. No. 8 St. John's	71–40	FS1	8,816
5	2:30 p.m.	No. 4 Marquette vs. No. 5 Villanova	66–73	FS2	8,816
6	7:00 p.m.	No. 2 Creighton vs. No. 10 Georgetown	72–70	FS2	
7	9:30 p.m.	No. 3 Seton Hall vs. No. 11 Xavier	48–40	FS2	
Semifinals – Sunday, March 9
8	2:30 p.m.	No. 1 UConn vs. No. 5 Villanova	82–54	Fox	
9	5:00 p.m.	No. 2 Creighton vs. No. 3 Seton Hall	73–44	Fox	
Championship – Monday, March 10
10	7:00 p.m.	No. 1 UConn vs. No. 2 Creighton	70–50	FS1	
Game times in EST for the first round and quarterfinals and EDT for the semifinals and championship. Rankings denote tournament seed.

== Bracket ==
First round Friday, March 7 FloSports
8	St. John's	66
9	Butler	50
7	Providence	56
10	Georgetown	58
6	DePaul	73
11	Xavier	80

Quarterfinals; Saturday, March 8 FS1/FS2
1	#3 UConn	71
8	St. John's	40
4	Marquette	66
5	Villanova	73
2	#23 Creighton	72
10	Georgetown	70
3	Seton Hall	48
11	Xavier	40

Semifinals; Sunday, March 9 Fox
1	#3 UConn	82
5	Villanova	54
2	#23 Creighton	73
3	Seton Hall	44

Championship; Monday, March 10; FS1
1	#3 UConn	70
2	#22 Creighton	50
