= 2024–25 Creighton Bluejays women's basketball team =

Intercollegiate basketball season

2024–25 Creighton Bluejays women's basketball

Emerald Coast Classic Beach Bracket champions

NCAA tournament, First Round
- Conference: Big East

Ranking
- Coaches: No. 22
- AP: No. 23
- Record: 26–7 (16–2 Big East)
- Head coach: Jim Flanery (23rd season)
- Assistant coaches: Carli Berger; Jordann Reese; Mike Jewett; Jaylyn Agnew
- Home arena: D. J. Sokol Arena

2024–25 Big East women's basketball standings
	Conf.				Overall
Team	W		L	PCT	W		L	PCT
No. 1 UConn †	18	–	0	1.000	37	–	3	.925
No. 23 Creighton	16	–	2	.889	26	–	7	.788
Seton Hall	13	–	5	.722	23	–	10	.697
Marquette	12	–	6	.667	21	–	11	.656
Villanova	11	–	7	.611	21	–	15	.583
DePaul	8	–	10	.444	13	–	19	.406
Providence	6	–	12	.333	13	–	19	.406
St. John's	5	–	13	.278	16	–	15	.516
Butler	5	–	13	.278	16	–	18	.471
Georgetown	4	–	14	.222	12	–	19	.387
Xavier	1	–	17	.056	7	–	24	.226
† 2025 Big East tournament winner Rankings from AP poll

The 2024–25 Creighton Bluejays women's basketball team represent Creighton University in the 2024–25 NCAA Division I women's basketball season. The Bluejays, led by 23rd-year head coach Jim Flanery, play their home games at D. J. Sokol Arena and are members of the Big East Conference.

== Previous season ==
The #22 ranked Bluejays began with an unexpected early season loss to the Green Bay Phoenix, but went 15–3 in Big East Conference play, with regular season losses only at #19 Marquette and both contests with #3 UConn. Creighton fell in the semifinals of the 2023–24 Big East Tournament, but was invited to the 2024 NCAA Division I women's basketball tournament region as a #7 seed. The Bluejays won their opener but lost at sub-regional host UCLA. Creighton ranked #23 at season's completion.

== Offseason ==
=== Departures ===
Name	Number	Pos.	Height	Year	Hometown	Reason left
Lexi Unruh	4	G	6'1"	RS Sophomore	Sioux Falls, SD	
Brittany Harshaw	23	G	6'1"	RS Sophomore	Andover, KS	
Emma Ronsiek	31	F	6'0"	Senior	Sioux Falls, SD	Graduated
McKayla Miller	32	G	6'1"	Sophomore	Cimarron, KS	

=== Incoming transfers ===
Name	Number	Pos.	Height	Year	Hometown	Previous school
Sydney Golladay	3	G	5'8"	Graduate student	Fremont, Nebraska	Fort Hays State
Brooke Littrell	33	G/F	6'2"	Graduate student	Green City, Missouri	Central Missouri

==== Recruiting class of 2024 ====
College recruiting
Name	Hometown	School	Height	Weight	Commit date
Elizabeth Gentry; Center	Littleton, Colorado	Arapahoe	6 ft 3 in (1.91 m)	N/A	
Elizabeth Gentry; Center	Recruit ratings: No ratings found				
Allison Heathcote; Guard	Edmond, Oklahoma	Edmond North	6 ft 1 in (1.85 m)	N/A	
Allison Heathcote; Guard	Recruit ratings: No ratings found				
Overall recruit ranking:
Note: In many cases, Scout, Rivals, 247Sports, On3, and ESPN may conflict in their listings of height and weight.; In these cases, the average was taken. ESPN grades are on a 100-point scale.; Sources: "2024 Player Commits". ESPN. Archived from the original on November 30, 2024.

==== Recruiting class of 2025 ====
College recruiting (2025)
Name	Hometown	School	Height	Weight	Commit date
Ava Zediker; PG	Des Moines, Iowa	Dowling Catholic High School	5 ft 10 in (1.78 m)	N/A	
Ava Zediker; PG	Recruit ratings: ESPN: (92)				
Neleigh Gessert; G/F	Omaha, Nebraska	Millard West High School	6 ft 0 in (1.83 m)	N/A	
Neleigh Gessert; G/F	Recruit ratings: ESPN: (92)				
Norah Gessert; G/F	Omaha, Nebraska	Millard West High School	6 ft 0 in (1.83 m)	N/A	
Norah Gessert; G/F	Recruit ratings: ESPN: (92)				
Overall recruit ranking:
Note: In many cases, Scout, Rivals, 247Sports, On3, and ESPN may conflict in their listings of height and weight.; In these cases, the average was taken. ESPN grades are on a 100-point scale.; Sources: "2025 Player Commits". ESPN. Archived from the original on November 30, 2024.

== Roster ==
2024–25 Creighton Bluejays women's basketball team
Players
Coaches

Pos.	#	Name	Height	Year	Previous school	Hometown
G	2	Kennedy Townsend	5 ft 10 in (1.78 m)	Jr	Park Hill	Kansas City, MO
G	3	Sydney Golladay	5 ft 8 in (1.73 m)	GS	Fremont; Fort Hays State	Fremont, NE
G	11	Kiani Lockett	5 ft 8 in (1.73 m)	Jr	Minnetonka	Minneapolis, MN
G	12	Jayme Horan	5 ft 10 in (1.78 m)	GS	Millard South	Omaha, NE
G	13	Allison Heathcock	6 ft 1 in (1.85 m)	Fr	Edmond North	Edmond, OK
F	14	Mallory Brake	6 ft 0 in (1.83 m)	GS	Hastings	Hastings, MN
G	15	Lauren Jensen	5 ft 10 in (1.78 m)	Sr	Lakeville North; Iowa	Lakeville, MN
G	21	Molly Mogensen	5 ft 7 in (1.7 m)	GS	Farmington	Farmington, MN
G/F	30	Morgan Maly	6 ft 1 in (1.85 m)	Sr	Crete	Crete, NE
G/F	33	Brooke Littrell	6 ft 2 in (1.88 m)	GS	Green City; Central Missouri	Green City, MO
C	35	Elizabeth Gentry	6 ft 3 in (1.91 m)	Fr	Arapahoe	Littleton, CO

Head coach

- Jim Flanery (Creighton)

Assistant coach(es)

- Carli Berger (Creighton)
- Jordann Reese (Drake)
- Mike Jewett (South Dakota)
- Jaylyn Agnew (Creighton)

Legend

- (C) Team captain
- (S) Suspended
- (I) Ineligible
- (W) Walk-on
- Injured
- Current redshirt

Roster
Last update: November 30, 2024

== Schedule and results ==
Date time, TV	Rank^{#}	Opponent^{#}	Result	Record	High points	High rebounds	High assists	Site (attendance) city, state
Exhibition
October 30, 2024*; 6:00 p.m.	No. 21	Southwest Minnesota State	W 99–48		21 – Jensen	6 – Gentry	7 – Lockett	D. J. Sokol Arena (804); Omaha, NE
Regular season
November 8, 2024*; 6:00 p.m., SLN/MidcoSN+	No. 21	at South Dakota State	L 71–76	0–1	23 – Jensen	9 – Mogensen	4 – Jensen	First Bank and Trust Arena (3,208); Brookings, SD
November 11, 2024*; 6:00 p.m., FloHoops		Drake	W 80–72	1–1	32 – Jensen	10 – Jensen	5 – Mogensen	D. J. Sokol Arena (1,609); Omaha, NE
November 14, 2024*; 7:30 p.m., ESPN2		at No. 10 Kansas State	L 68–86	1–2	16 – Townsend	5 – Tied	3 – Mogensen	Bramlage Coliseum (5,436); Manhattan, KS
November 22, 2024*; 4:00 p.m., FloHoops		No. 21 Nebraska	W 80–74	2–2	31 – Jensen	6 – Brake	7 – Mogensen	D. J. Sokol Arena (2,374); Omaha, NE
November 25, 2024*; 7:30 p.m., FloHoops		vs. Wichita State; Emerald Coast Classic Beach Bracket semifinals	W 91–63	3–2	15 – Tied	7 – Jensen	6 – Jensen	The Arena at NFSC (450); Niceville, FL
November 26, 2024*; 8:30 p.m., FloHoops		vs. Syracuse; Emerald Coast Classic Beach Bracket championship	W 86–59	4–2	28 – Maly	6 – Horan	5 – Tied	The Arena at NFSC (500); Niceville, FL
December 1, 2024*; 1:00 p.m., ESPN2		at Tulsa	W 81–59	5–2	16 – Maly	9 – Jensen	5 – Jensen	Reynolds Center (2,043); Tulsa, OK
December 4, 2024; 10:00 a.m., FloHoops		at Xavier	W 82–54	6–2 (1–0)	23 – Jensen	5 – Tied	7 – Mogensen	Cintas Center (5,110); Cincinnati, OH
December 7, 2024*; 2:00 p.m., ESPN+		at Northern Iowa	W 75–71	7–2	17 – Jensen	8 – Littrell	10 – Jensen	McLeod Center (2,745); Cedar Falls, IA
December 14, 2024*; 1:00 p.m., ESPN+		at Green Bay	W 74–52	8–2	18 – Mogensen	7 – Mogensen	6 – Jensen	Kress Events Center (1,938); Green Bay, WI
December 17, 2024*; 6:00 p.m., KYNE-TV		Wyoming	W 76–60	9–2	29 – Maly	5 – Tied	4 – Tied	D. J. Sokol Arena (1,066); Omaha, NE
December 20, 2024*; 10:00 p.m., FS1		vs. No. 1 UCLA; Invisalign Bay Area Women's Classic	L 41–70	9–3	15 – Maly	8 – Lockett	2 – Maly	Chase Center (3,766); San Francisco, CA
December 28, 2024; 1:00 p.m., FOX		at St. John's	W 75–56	10–3 (2–0)	23 – Jensen	7 – Mogensen	5 – Tied	Carnesecca Arena (1,474); Queens, NY
January 1, 2025; 1:00 p.m., FloHoops		Butler	W 68–64	11–3 (3–0)	22 – Jensen	10 – Maly	5 – Tied	D. J. Sokol Arena (2,196); Omaha, NE
January 4, 2025; 1:00 p.m., FloHoops		at Providence	W 60–46	12–3 (4–0)	14 – Maly	8 – Brake	2 – Tied	Alumni Hall (783); Providence, RI
January 8, 2025; 6:00 p.m., FloHoops		Marquette	W 71–68	13–3 (5–0)	28 – Maly	6 – Maly	6 – Tied	D. J. Sokol Arena (1,290); Omaha, NE
January 11, 2025; 11:00 a.m., FloHoops		at Seton Hall	W 72–64	14–3 (6–0)	23 – Maly	8 – Mogensen	6 – Mogensen	Walsh Gymnasium (921); South Orange, NJ
January 18, 2025; 1:00 p.m., FloHoops		DePaul	W 92–71	15–3 (7–0)	21 – Mogensen	10 – Maly	6 – Tied	D. J. Sokol Arena (1,321); Omaha, NE
January 22, 2025; 6:00 p.m., FloHoops		at Butler	W 63–52	16–3 (8–0)	24 – Maly	6 – Maly	5 – Jensen	Hinkle Fieldhouse (864); Indianapolis, IN
January 25, 2025; 4:30 p.m., FOX		No. 6 UConn	L 61–72	16–4 (8–1)	14 – Tied	9 – Maly	5 – Brake	CHI Health Center Omaha (11,141); Omaha, NE
January 29, 2025; 1:00 p.m., FloHoops		at Georgetown	W 84–70	17–4 (9–1)	22 – Tied	9 – Brake	7 – Mogensen	McDonough Arena (313); Washington, D.C.
February 2, 2025; 1:00 p.m., FS1		Providence	W 79–66	18–4 (10–1)	17 – Mogensen	8 – Mogensen	5 – Mogensen	D. J. Sokol Arena (2,239); Omaha, NE
February 5, 2025; 6:00 p.m., FloHoops		Seton Hall	W 72–56	19–4 (11–1)	21 – Jensen	10 – Maly	4 – Tied	D. J. Sokol Arena (1,153); Omaha, NE
February 8, 2025; 1:00 p.m., FloHoops		at Villanova	W 70–57	20–4 (12–1)	25 – Jensen	10 – Maly	4 – Tied	Finneran Pavilion (1,951); Villanova, PA
February 15, 2025; 3:00 p.m., FS1	No. 24	Georgetown	W 70–48	21–4 (13–1)	18 – Maly	9 – Jensen	4 – Tied	D. J. Sokol Arena (1,862); Omaha, NE
February 19, 2025; 6:00 p.m., FloHoops	No. 23	St. John's	W 65–62	22–4 (14–1)	20 – Maly	6 – Maly	5 – Mogensen	D. J. Sokol Arena (1,035); Omaha, NE
February 23, 2025; 2:00 p.m., FloHoops	No. 23	at DePaul	W 83–74	23–4 (15–1)	28 – Jensen	7 – Maly	5 – Mogensen	Wintrust Arena (2,559); Chicago, IL
February 27, 2025; 6:00 p.m., CBSSN	No. 22	at No. 5 UConn	L 53–72	23–5 (15–2)	11 – Maly	7 – Tied	3 – Lockett	XL Center (15,684); Hartford, CT
March 2, 2025; 7:30 p.m., FS1	No. 22	Villanova	W 70–55	24–5 (16–2)	23 – Maly	11 – Mogensen	6 – Jensen	D. J. Sokol Arena (1,722); Omaha, NE
Big East Women's Tournament
March 8, 2025; 6:00 p.m., FS2	(2) No. 23	vs. (10) Georgetown; Quarterfinals	W 72–70	25–5	22 – Jensen	7 – Maly	5 – Mogensen	Mohegan Sun Arena; Uncasville, CT
March 9, 2025; 4:00 p.m., FOX	(2) No. 23	vs. (3) Seton Hall; Semifinals	W 73–44	26–5	19 – Jensen	6 – Mogensen	4 – Maly	Mohegan Sun Arena; Uncasville, CT
March 10, 2025; 7:00 p.m., FS1	(2) No. 22	vs. (1) No. 3 UConn; Championship	L 50–70	26–6	13 – Jensen	7 – Jensen	3 – Tied	Mohegan Sun Arena; Uncasville, CT
NCAA Women's Tournament
March 22, 2025*; 6:15 p.m., ESPNews	(9 B3)	vs. (8 B3) No. 23 Illinois; First Round	L 57–66	26–7	18 – Maly	8 – Mogensen	5 – Mogensen	Moody Center; Austin, TX
*Non-conference game. ^{#}Rankings from AP Poll. (#) Tournament seedings in parentheses. B3=Birmingham 3. All times are in Central.

== Rankings ==
Ranking movements Legend: ██ Increase in ranking ██ Decrease in ranking — = Not ranked RV = Received votes
	Week																				
Poll	Pre	1	2	3	4	5	6	7	8	9	10	11	12	13	14	15	16	17	18	19	Final
AP	21	RV	—	RV	RV	RV	RV	—	—	—	RV	RV	RV	RV	24	23	22	23	22	23	
Coaches	20	RV	RV	RV	—	—	—	—	—	RV	RV	RV	RV	RV	25	23	21	22	22	22	

== See also ==
- 2024–25 Creighton Bluejays men's basketball team
