= 2024–25 Butler Bulldogs women's basketball team =

American college basketball season

2024–25 Butler Bulldogs women's basketball

WNIT, Super 16
- Conference: Big East Conference
- Record: 16–18 (5–13 Big East)
- Head coach: Austin Parkinson (3rd season)
- Assistant coaches: Latrell Flemming; Kristin Wodrich; Holly Hoopingarner; Nevena Markovic
- Home arena: Hinkle Fieldhouse

2024–25 Big East women's basketball standings
	Conf.				Overall
Team	W		L	PCT	W		L	PCT
No. 1 UConn †	18	–	0	1.000	37	–	3	.925
No. 23 Creighton	16	–	2	.889	26	–	7	.788
Seton Hall	13	–	5	.722	23	–	10	.697
Marquette	12	–	6	.667	21	–	11	.656
Villanova	11	–	7	.611	21	–	15	.583
DePaul	8	–	10	.444	13	–	19	.406
Providence	6	–	12	.333	13	–	19	.406
St. John's	5	–	13	.278	16	–	15	.516
Butler	5	–	13	.278	16	–	18	.471
Georgetown	4	–	14	.222	12	–	19	.387
Xavier	1	–	17	.056	7	–	24	.226
† 2025 Big East tournament winner Rankings from AP poll

The 2024–25 Butler Bulldogs women's basketball team represented Butler University in the 2024–25 NCAA Division I women's basketball season. The Bulldogs, led by third year head coach Austin Parkinson, played their home games at Hinkle Fieldhouse and are members of the Big East Conference.

== Previous season ==
The Bulldogs finished the 2023–24 season 15–17, 6–12 in Big East play to finish in a tie for eighth place. As the No. 8 seed in the Big East tournament, they lost in the first round to Georgetown. They received an at-large bid to the WNIT where they defeated Bowling Green in the first round before losing to Purdue in the second round.

== Offseason ==
=== Departures ===
Name	Number	Pos.	Height	Year	Hometown	Reason for departure
Rachel Kent	10	G/F	5'11"	GS Senior	Des Plaines, IL	Graduated
Chloe Jeffers	12	G	5'10'	Sophomore	Delaware, OH	Not team roster
Rosemarie Dumont	22	F	6'3"	Senior	Quebec City, QC	Transferred to Laval
Abby Stoddard	30	G/F	6'1"	Senior	Crown Point, IN	Graduated
Anna Mortag	34	G/F	6'0"	Senior	Milwaukee, WI	Transferred to Florida Gulf Coast
Kendall Wingler	55	G	5'10"	(redshirt) Senior	Ekron, KY	Transferred to IU Indy

=== Incoming transfers ===
Name	Number	Pos.	Height	Year	Hometown	Previous school
Kilyn McGuff	11	G	6'0"	Senior	Columbus, OH	Belmont

==== Recruiting class of 2024 ====
College recruiting information
Name	Hometown	School	Height	Weight	Commit date
McKenzie Swanson; F	Rochester, Michigan	Marian High School (Michigan)	6 ft 3 in (1.91 m)	N/A	
McKenzie Swanson; F	Recruit ratings: No ratings found				
Lily Zeinstra; G	Byron Center, Michigan	Byron Center High School	5 ft 11 in (1.80 m)	N/A	
Lily Zeinstra; G	Recruit ratings: No ratings found				
Lily Carmody; G	Melbourne, Australia		5 ft 11 in (1.80 m)	N/A	
Lily Carmody; G	Recruit ratings: No ratings found				
Jocelyn Land; F	Chanhassen, Minnesota	Holy Family Catholic High School (Minnesota)	6 ft 0 in (1.83 m)	N/A	
Jocelyn Land; F	Recruit ratings: No ratings found				
Overall recruit ranking:
Note: In many cases, Scout, Rivals, 247Sports, On3, and ESPN may conflict in their listings of height and weight.; In these cases, the average was taken. ESPN grades are on a 100-point scale.; Sources: "2024 Player Commits". ESPN. Archived from the original on December 5, 2024.

== Roster ==
2024–25 Butler Bulldogs women's basketball team
Players
Coaches

Pos.	#	Name	Height	Year	Previous school	Hometown
G	1	Karsyn Norman	5 ft 6 in (1.68 m)	So	Bedford North Lawrence	Bedford, IN
G/F	2	Riley Makalusky	6 ft 2 in (1.88 m)	So	Hamilton Southeastern	Fishers, IN
G	3	Ari Wiggins	5 ft 8 in (1.73 m)	Sr	Heritage Christian; Michigan	Indianapolis, IN
F	5	McKenzie Swanson	6 ft 3 in (1.91 m)	Fr	Birmingham Marian	Rochester, MI
G	10	Lily Zeinstra	5 ft 11 in (1.8 m)	Fr	Byron Center	Byron Center, MI
G	11	Kilyn McGuff	6 ft 0 in (1.83 m)	Sr	Bishop Watterson; Belmont	Columbus, OH
G	12	Lily Carmody	5 ft 11 in (1.8 m)	Fr		Melbourne, Australia
F	14	Jocelyn Land	6 ft 0 in (1.83 m)	Fr	Holy Family Catholic	Chanhassen, MN
G	21	Caroline Strande	5 ft 11 in (1.8 m)	GS	Racine Lutheran; Minnesota	Racine, WI
G	23	Jordan Meulemans	6 ft 0 in (1.83 m)	Jr	De Pere	De Pere, WI
F	24	Cristen Carter	6 ft 4 in (1.93 m)	Jr	Ben Davis	Indianapolis, IN
F	31	Lilly Stoddard	6 ft 4 in (1.93 m)	So	Crown Point; Purdue	Crown Point, IN
F	32	Sydney James	6 ft 3 in (1.91 m)	Sr	Trinity Lutheran	Brownstown, IN

Head coach

- Austin Parkinson (Purdue)

Assistant coach(es)

- Latrell Fleming (Wisconsin)
- Kristin Wodrich (Texas Tech)
- Holly Hoopingarner (IUPUI)
- Nevena Markovic (IUPUI)

Legend

- (C) Team captain
- (S) Suspended
- (I) Ineligible
- (W) Walk-on
- Injured
- Current redshirt

Roster

== Schedule and results ==
Date time, TV	Rank^{#}	Opponent^{#}	Result	Record	High points	High rebounds	High assists	Site (attendance) city, state
Exhibition
November 1, 2024*; 7:00 p.m.		Taylor	W 99–48		–	–	–	Hinkle Fieldhouse; Indianapolis, IN
Non-conference regular season
November 6, 2024*; 11:00 a.m., YouTube		Chicago State	W 87–45	1–0	17 – McGuff	10 – Tied	6 – Norman	Hinkle Fieldhouse (2,941); Indianapolis, IN
November 9, 2024*; 2:00 p.m., ESPN+		at Milwaukee	W 79–70 ^{OT}	2–0	20 – Carmody	9 – Carter	4 – Carmody	Klotsche Center (454); Milwaukee, WI
November 13, 2024*; 7:00 p.m., FloSports		Indiana	W 56–46	3–0	14 – Strande	8 – Strande	4 – Norman	Hinkle Fieldhouse (4,135); Indianapolis, IN
November 17, 2024*; 3:00 p.m., SECN+/ESPN+		at Vanderbilt	L 52–81	3–1	22 – Strande	4 – McGuff	4 – Wiggins	Memorial Gymnasium (2,615); Nashville, TN
November 20, 2024*; 7:00 p.m., FloSports		Indiana State	W 80–55	4–1	15 – Strande	6 – McGuff	6 – Tied	Hinkle Fieldhouse (877); Indianapolis, IN
November 24, 2024*; 2:00 p.m., FloSports		UMass Lowell	W 69–44	5–1	26 – Strande	10 – McGuff	5 – Makalusky	Hinkle Fieldhouse (940); Indianapolis, IN
November 29, 2024*; 5:00 p.m., FloSports		vs. Santa Clara; Gulf Coast Showcase quarterfinals	W 79–50	6–1	16 – Jaynes	5 – Tied	4 – Strande	Hertz Arena (213); Estero, FL
November 30, 2024*; 7:30 p.m., FloSports		vs. No. 5 Texas; Gulf Coast Showcase semifinals	L 59–94	6–2	14 – Strande	6 – McGuff	3 – Wiggins	Hertz Arena (412); Estero, FL
December 1, 2024*; 5:00 p.m., FloSports		vs. Boise State; Gulf Coast Showcase 3rd place game	W 70–54	7–2	23 – Strande	10 – McGuff	6 – Norman	Hertz Arena (274); Estero, FL
December 5, 2024*; 7:00 p.m., FloSports		UT Martin	W 70–60	8–2	13 – Zeinstra	10 – McGuff	4 – Norman	Hinkle Fieldhouse (677); Indianapolis, IN
December 8, 2024*; 1:00 p.m., ESPN+		at Ohio	W 69–60	9–2	18 – McGuff	15 – McGuff	3 – Norman	Convocation Center (702); Athens, OH
December 11, 2024*; 7:00 p.m., FloSports		Wisconsin	L 64–71 ^{2OT}	9–3	13 – Tied	9 – McGuff	5 – Wiggins	Hinkle Fieldhouse (1,030); Indianapolis, IN
December 15, 2024*; 1:00 p.m., FloSports		Saint Francis (PA)	W 95–38	10–3	18 – Carmody	7 – Tied	6 – Tied	Hinkle Fieldhouse (943); Indianapolis, IN
Big East regular season
December 21, 2024; 3:00 p.m., FloSports		at DePaul	L 43–66	10–4 (0–1)	12 – Carmody	6 – Carmody	3 – Tied	Wintrust Arena (1,300); Chicago, IL
December 29, 2024; 2:00 p.m., FloSports		Seton Hall	L 49–69	10–5 (0–2)	11 – Makalusky	6 – McGuff	3 – Jaynes	Hinkle Fieldhouse (1,776); Indianapolis, IN
January 1, 2025; 3:00 p.m., FloSports		at Creighton	L 64–68	10–6 (0–3)	16 – Carmody	10 – McGuff	4 – Zeinstra	D. J. Sokol Arena (2,196); Omaha, NE
January 4, 2025; 4:00 p.m., FS1		at Marquette	L 54–57	10–7 (0–4)	18 – McGuff	17 – McGuff	4 – Carmody	Al McGuire Center (3,109); Milwaukee, WI
January 8, 2025; 7:00 p.m., FloSports		Providence	W 57–47	11–7 (1–4)	14 – McGuff	7 – McGuff	6 – Norman	Hinkle Fieldhouse (787); Indianapolis, IN
January 14, 2025; 7:00 p.m., FloSports		Georgetown	W 63–53	12–7 (2–4)	18 – McGuff	7 – Carmody	4 – McGuff	Hinkle Fieldhouse (742); Indianapolis, IN
January 18, 2025; 2:00 p.m., FloSports		at Xavier	L 49–50	12–8 (2–5)	9 – Tied	9 – McGuff	4 – Carmody	Cintas Center (1,293); Cincinnati, OH
January 22, 2025; 7:00 p.m., FloSports		Creighton	L 52–63	12–9 (2–6)	16 – Jaynes	13 – McGuff	3 – Wiggins	Hinkle Fieldhouse (864); Indianapolis, IN
January 26, 2025; 2:00 p.m., FloSports		DePaul	L 67–74 ^{OT}	12–10 (2–7)	19 – McGuff	10 – McGuff	3 – Norman	Hinkle Fieldhouse (2,018); Indianapolis, IN
January 29, 2025; 7:00 p.m., FloSports		at Seton Hall	L 48–71	12–11 (2–8)	14 – Land	11 – Zeinstra	3 – Tied	Walsh Gymnasium (900); South Orange, NJ
February 2, 2025; 1:00 p.m., SNY		at No. 6 UConn	L 59–101	12–12 (2–9)	17 – McGuff	7 – McGuff	4 – Norman	XL Center (15,684); Hartford, CT
February 5, 2025; 7:00 p.m., FloSports		Villanova	L 59–63	12–13 (2–10)	19 – McGuff	15 – McGuff	6 – Wiggins	Hinkle Fieldhouse (987); Indianapolis, IN
February 9, 2025; 2:00 p.m., FloSports		Marquette	W 67–65	13–13 (3–10)	21 – McGuff	6 – Jaynes	4 – Tied	Hinkle Fieldhouse (1,812); Indianapolis, IN
February 12, 2025; 11:00 a.m., FloSports		at Georgetown	W 76–70	14–13 (4–10)	18 – Jaynes	6 – McGuff	4 – Carmody	McDonough Arena (119); Washington, D.C.
February 16, 2025; 5:30 p.m., FloSports		at St. John's	L 43–65	14–14 (4–11)	12 – McGuff	7 – Zeinstra	3 – Tied	Madison Square Garden; New York, NY
February 19, 2025; 7:00 p.m., FloSports		Xavier	W 58–54	15–14 (5–11)	18 – Zeinstra	7 – McGuff	4 – Tied	Hinkle Fieldhouse (923); Indianapolis, IN
February 22, 2024; 4:30 p.m., SNY		No. 5 UConn	L 47–86	15–15 (5–12)	13 – Tied	7 – McGuff	5 – Carmody	Hinkle Fieldhouse (9,100); Indianapolis, IN
February 26, 2025; 6:00 p.m., FloSports		at Villanova	L 54–56	15–16 (5–13)	21 – McGuff	9 – Jaynes	3 – Zeinstra	Finneran Pavilion (1,509); Villanova, PA
Big East Women's Tournament
March 7, 2025; 11:00 a.m., BEDN	(9)	vs. (8) St. John's; First Round	L 50–66	15–17	14 – Jaynes	7 – McGuff	3 – McGuff	Mohegan Sun Arena; Uncasville, CT
WNIT
March 23, 2025*; 1:00 p.m., YouTube		UIC; Round 2	W 61–54	16–17	16 – Zeinstra	7 – McGuff	4 – Wiggins	Hinkle Fieldhouse (445); Indianapolis, IN
March 28, 2025*; 7:00 p.m., ESPN+		at Purdue Fort Wayne; Super 16	L 61–87	16–18	18 – McGuff	6 – Zeinstra	3 – Tied	Gates Sports Center (1,015); Fort Wayne, IN
*Non-conference game. ^{#}Rankings from AP Poll. (#) Tournament seedings in parentheses. All times are in EST.

== See also ==
- 2024–25 Butler Bulldogs men's basketball team
