= 2024–25 UConn Huskies women's basketball team =

Intercollegiate basketball season

2024–25 UConn Huskies women's basketball

Big East regular season & tournament champions Baha Mar Women's Championship champions

NCAA tournament champions
- Conference: Big East Conference

Ranking
- Coaches: No. 1
- AP: No. 1
- Record: 37–3 (18–0 Big East)
- Head coach: Geno Auriemma (40th season)
- Associate head coach: Chris Dailey (40th season)
- Assistant coaches: Jamelle Elliott (5th season); Morgan Valley (4th season); Tonya Cardoza (2nd season); Ben Kantor (2nd season)
- Home arena: Harry A. Gampel Pavilion; XL Center

2024–25 Big East women's basketball standings
	Conf.				Overall
Team	W		L	PCT	W		L	PCT
No. 1 UConn †	18	–	0	1.000	37	–	3	.925
No. 23 Creighton	16	–	2	.889	26	–	7	.788
Seton Hall	13	–	5	.722	23	–	10	.697
Marquette	12	–	6	.667	21	–	11	.656
Villanova	11	–	7	.611	21	–	15	.583
DePaul	8	–	10	.444	13	–	19	.406
Providence	6	–	12	.333	13	–	19	.406
St. John's	5	–	13	.278	16	–	15	.516
Butler	5	–	13	.278	16	–	18	.471
Georgetown	4	–	14	.222	12	–	19	.387
Xavier	1	–	17	.056	7	–	24	.226
† 2025 Big East tournament winner Rankings from AP poll

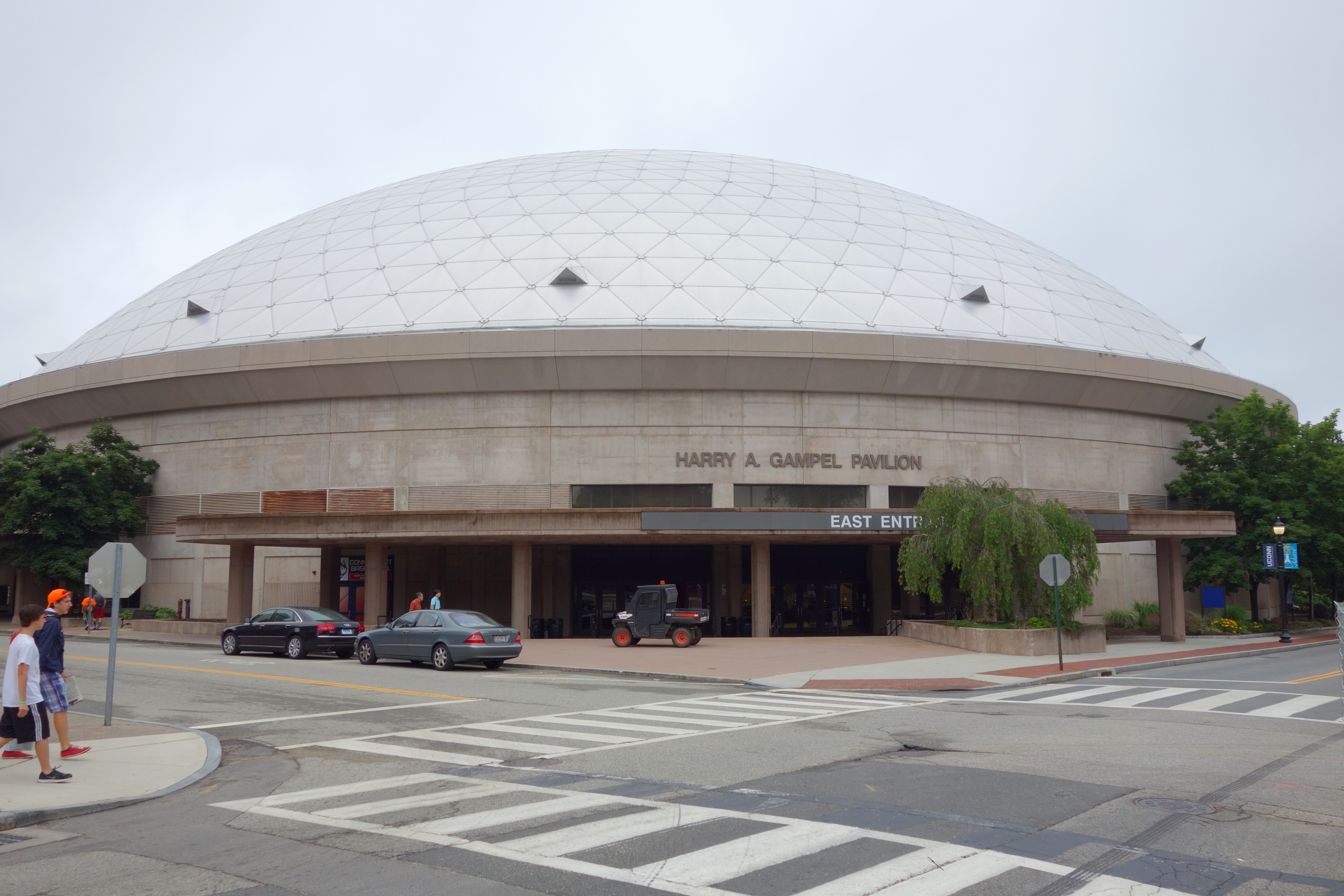
Harry A. Gampel Pavilion, where the Huskies played home games

The 2024–25 UConn Huskies women's basketball team represented the University of Connecticut (UConn) during the 2024–25 NCAA Division I women's basketball season, winning the national championship. The Huskies were led by Hall of Fame head coach Geno Auriemma in his 40th season at UConn, and split their home games between Harry A. Gampel Pavilion on their campus in Storrs, Connecticut, and the XL Center in Hartford, Connecticut. UConn is a member of the Big East Conference, which it rejoined in the 2020–21 season; it had been a member of the original Big East Conference from 1979 through 2013, and one of the original women's basketball teams in that conference in 1982. (Note: The settlement of the 2013 split of the Big East Conference resulted in the so-called "Catholic 7" purchasing the "Big East" name and reorganizing as a new conference. The original conference charter was retained by the Division I FBS football schools that now operate as the American Athletic Conference. As part of the settlement, the current Big East recognizes the competitive history of the original conference in all sports that it sponsors.)

After losing two graduates to the WNBA, UConn entered the season ranked #2 in the AP and Coaches polls, returning two-time All American Paige Bueckers and several other players previously redshirted for injury, with some still unavailable at the season's start. The Huskies added a solid recruiting class, including #1 ranked recruit Sarah Strong, and also picked up Princeton graduate Kaitlyn Chen from the transfer portal.

An early season win against Fairleigh Dickinson was Auriemma's 1217th career victory, making him the winningest head coach in NCAA history. The Huskies won early non-conference games against North Carolina, Ole Miss, and Louisville, while losing against ranked Notre Dame, USC, and Tennessee. In a much anticipated February game of ranked opponents, UConn shocked home team and defending national champion South Carolina, 87–58. The Huskies continued to dominate Big East conference play, going undefeated for the second consecutive season and winning the Big East tournament. In the 2025 NCAA Division I tournament, UConn was seeded second in their regional and won their way to the national title match, defeating opponents by an average of 34 points per game. In the tournament finals, a rematch against South Carolina, the Huskies defeated the Gamecocks, 82–59, to win their 12th national championship. UConn finished the season with a record of 37–3.

== Previous season ==
UConn was ranked second in pre-season polls but lost three early non-conference games and several key players to injury by midseason. The Huskies went undefeated in Big East conference play and the post-season conference tournament, anchored by previous All-Americans Paige Bueckers and Aaliyah Edwards. Both players were selected to the 2023–24 All-Big East and All-American teams; point guard Nika Mühl was an All-Big East selection and completed the season as UConn's all-time career assists leader. The Huskies entered the NCAA tournament seeded third in their bracket, but emerged victorious with Bueckers awarded the most outstanding player. The Caitlin Clark-led Iowa Hawkeyes defeated the Huskies in their Final Four contest, a match watched by a record 14.4 million ESPN college basketball viewers. UConn ended the season 33–6, ranked #3 in both polls. Both Edwards and Mühl were selected in the 2024 WNBA draft.

== Offseason ==
=== Departures ===
The Huskies graduated senior starters Aaliyah Edwards and Nika Mühl from the 2023–24 roster, and both were drafted into the Women's National Basketball Association. Two undergraduates chose to enter the transfer portal after the NCAA tournament, senior Amari Deberry and junior Inês Bettencourt.

Name	Number	Pos.	Height	Year	Hometown	Reason for departure
Aaliyah Edwards	3	F	6'3"	Graduated	Kingston, Ontario	Drafted by the WNBA's Washington Mystics
Nika Mühl	10	G	5'11"	Graduated	Zagreb, Croatia	Drafted by the WNBA's Seattle Storm
Inês Bettencourt	21	G	5'9"	Junior	São Miguel, Portugal	Transferred to Gonzaga
Amari Deberry	42	F	6'6"	Senior	Williamsville, New York	Transferred to Maryland

=== Incoming transfers ===
Tour of Huskies' team facilities
- UCONN Women's Basketball Virtual Tour

The Huskies added Kaitlyn Chen, a graduate student who transferred from Princeton University. While at Princeton under head coach Carla Berube, Chen was the 2023–24 Ivy League Player of the Year and was two-time All-Ivy First Team.

Name	Number	Pos.	Height	Year	Hometown	Previous school
Kaitlyn Chen	20	G	5'9"	Graduate student	San Marino, California	Princeton

=== Recruiting ===
==== Recruiting class of 2024 ====
On December 3, 2022, UConn received a verbal commitment from five-star guard Allie Ziebell. Fellow five-star guard Morgan Cheli committed to UConn soon after. In November 2023, ESPN ranked the Huskies' 2024 class as the sixth-best in the country. On April 6, 2024, the #1 player in the class of 2024, five-star forward Sarah Strong, also committed to UConn.

College recruiting information
Name	Hometown	School	Height	Weight	Commit date
Sarah Strong; F	Fuquay-Varina, NC	Grace Christian School	6 ft 2 in (1.88 m)	N/A	
Sarah Strong; F	Recruit ratings: ESPN: (98)				
Allie Ziebell; G	Neenah, WI	Neenah High School	5 ft 11 in (1.80 m)	N/A	
Allie Ziebell; G	Recruit ratings: ESPN: (98)				
Morgan Cheli; G	San Jose, CA	Archbishop Mitty High School	6 ft 2 in (1.88 m)	N/A	
Morgan Cheli; G	Recruit ratings: ESPN: (97)				
Overall recruit ranking: ESPN: 6
Note: In many cases, Scout, Rivals, 247Sports, On3, and ESPN may conflict in their listings of height and weight.; In these cases, the average was taken. ESPN grades are on a 100-point scale.; Sources: "2024 Player Commits". ESPN. Archived from the original on November 11, 2023.

==== Recruiting class of 2025 ====
ESPN ranked UConn's 2025 class as the sixth-best in the country.

College recruiting information (2025)
Name	Hometown	School	Height	Weight	Commit date
Kelis Fisher; PG	Baltimore, MD	IMG Academy	5 ft 9 in (1.75 m)	N/A	
Kelis Fisher; PG	Recruit ratings: ESPN: (96)				
Gandy Malou-Mamel; C	Limerick, Ireland	Gill St. Bernard's School	6 ft 5 in (1.96 m)	N/A	
Gandy Malou-Mamel; C	Recruit ratings: ESPN: (92)				
Blanca Quiñónez; F	Milagro, Ecuador		6 ft 1 in (1.85 m)	N/A	
Blanca Quiñónez; F	Recruit ratings: No ratings found				
Overall recruit ranking: ESPN: 6
Note: In many cases, Scout, Rivals, 247Sports, On3, and ESPN may conflict in their listings of height and weight.; In these cases, the average was taken. ESPN grades are on a 100-point scale.; Sources: "2025 Player Commits". ESPN. Archived from the original on January 20, 2025.

=== Coaching ===
Hall of Fame head coach Geno Auriemma and Hall of Fame associate head coach Chris Dailey returned for their 40th season. Assistant coach Jamelle Elliott was a UConn assistant coach from 1998 to 2009 and returned after a nine-year head coaching stint at Cincinnati. Assistant coach Morgan Valley was the head coach of the Hartford Hawks when hired by the Huskies. Elliott and Valley are both former UConn players. Tonya Cardoza, another former Huskies assistant, returned to UConn in 2023 after serving as Temple's head coach for 15 years. In 2023, UConn announced Ben Kantor was promoted to assistant coach from his previous staff position serving as the team's video coordinator since 2015. The November 20 home victory against Fairleigh Dickinson was Auriemma's 1217th, making him the winningest head coach in NCAA history.

== Season summary ==
UConn entered the season ranked #2 in the AP and Coaches polls, returning two-time All-American Paige Bueckers and several other players previously redshirted for injury, with some still unavailable at the season's start. The Huskies added a solid recruiting class, including #1 ranked recruit Sarah Strong, and also picked up Princeton graduate Kaitlyn Chen from the transfer portal.

An early season win against Fairleigh Dickinson was Geno Auriemma's 1217th career victory, making him the winningest head coach in NCAA history. UConn's main starting lineup was set when guard Azzi Fudd returned from a year-long injury hiatus, joining guards Bueckers and Chen, forward Strong, and center Jana El-Alfy. Guards Ashlynn Shade and KK Arnold and forward Ice Brady were the primary contributors off the bench.

The Huskies started the season well, winning non-conference games against three ranked opponents: North Carolina, Ole Miss, and Louisville. However, in December, they lost non-conference games to ranked Notre Dame and USC.

UConn then commenced their Big East conference schedule. They had an 11-game winning streak from late December to early February until they were surprised by ranked non-conference opponent Tennessee. Ten days later, UConn defeated the #4 team in the country, defending national champion South Carolina, 87–58.

UConn finished its regular season with a record of 28–3. They won the Big East regular season title, going undefeated for the second consecutive season, including wins over ranked Creighton. The Huskies then won the Big East tournament. Bueckers and Strong were both named to All-American teams. The media started referring to Bueckers, Strong, and Fudd as UConn's "big three" that was expected to lead the team to a deep run in the NCAA tournament.

Going into the tournament, UConn was ranked #3 in both polls and was seeded second in its regional. They defeated Arkansas State and South Dakota State to advance to their 31st consecutive Sweet Sixteen. UConn then defeated Oklahoma and won a rematch with USC to advance to the Final Four. Bueckers, who had already declared for the 2025 WNBA draft, scored over 30 points in three straight games, including a career-high 40 against Oklahoma. UConn won its Final Four game against UCLA by 34 points. The title game was a rematch against South Carolina, and the Huskies defeated the Gamecocks to win their 12th national championship. Fudd was named the tournament's most outstanding player.

UConn had a 37–3 record, ending with a 16-game winning streak. All 37 of their victories were by double digit margins. Strong led the team in rebounds during the season. Bueckers led the team in points and assists, and she finished her UConn career with the third-most points in program history.

== Roster ==
2024–25 UConn Huskies women's basketball team
Players
Coaches

Pos.	#	Name	Height	Year	Previous school	Hometown
G	2	KK Arnold	5 ft 9 in (1.75 m)	So	Germantown	Germantown, WI
G	5	Paige Bueckers	6 ft 0 in (1.83 m)	RS Sr	Hopkins	Hopkins, MN
C	8	Jana El-Alfy	6 ft 5 in (1.96 m)	RS Fr	Al Ahly SC	Cairo, Egypt
G	10	Qadence Samuels	6 ft 0 in (1.83 m)	So	Bishop McNamara	Forestville, MD
G	11	Allie Ziebell	6 ft 0 in (1.83 m)	Fr	Neenah	Neenah, WI
G	12	Ashlynn Shade	5 ft 10 in (1.78 m)	So	La Lumiere	Noblesville, IN
G	20	Kaitlyn Chen	5 ft 9 in (1.75 m)	GS	Princeton	San Marino, CA
F	21	Sarah Strong	6 ft 2 in (1.88 m)	Fr	Grace Christian	Fuquay-Varina, NC
G	23	Morgan Cheli (injured)	6 ft 2 in (1.88 m)	Fr	Archbishop Mitty	San Jose, CA
F	25	Ice Brady	6 ft 3 in (1.91 m)	RS So	Cathedral Catholic	San Diego, CA
G	33	Caroline Ducharme	6 ft 2 in (1.88 m)	RS Jr	Noble & Greenough	Milton, MA
F	34	Ayanna Patterson (injured)	6 ft 2 in (1.88 m)	RS So	Homestead	Fort Wayne, IN
G	35	Azzi Fudd	5 ft 11 in (1.8 m)	RS Jr	St. John's College HS	Arlington, VA
F	44	Aubrey Griffin	6 ft 1 in (1.85 m)	RS Sr	Ossining	Ossining, NY

Head coach

- Geno Auriemma (West Chester)

Assistant coach(es)

- Chris Dailey (Rutgers)
- Jamelle Elliott (Connecticut)
- Morgan Valley (Connecticut)
- Tonya Cardoza (Virginia)
- Ben Kantor (Illinois)

Legend

- (C) Team captain
- (S) Suspended
- (I) Ineligible
- (W) Walk-on
- Injured
- Current redshirt

Roster
Last update: January 20, 2025

== Schedule and results ==
Date time, TV	Rank^{#}	Opponent^{#}	Result	Record	High points	High rebounds	High assists	Site (attendance) city, state
Exhibition
November 3, 2024*; 12:00 p.m., WWAX	No. 2	Fort Hays State	W 89–49		27 – Bueckers	9 – 2 Tied	5 – Chen	Harry A. Gampel Pavilion (10,299); Storrs, CT
Regular season
November 7, 2024*; 7:00 p.m., SNY	No. 2	Boston University	W 86–32	1–0	17 – 2 tied	11 – El Alfy	7 – Bueckers	XL Center (13,355); Hartford, CT
November 10, 2024*; 4:30 p.m., SNY	No. 2	South Florida	W 86–49	2–0	22 – Bueckers	7 – 2 tied	7 – Chen	Harry A. Gampel Pavilion (10,299); Storrs, CT
November 15, 2024*; 6:00 p.m., ESPN2	No. 2	vs. No. 14 North Carolina	W 69–58	3–0	29 – Bueckers	13 – Strong	6 – Strong	Greensboro Coliseum (10,467); Greensboro, NC
November 20, 2024*; 7:00 p.m., SNY	No. 2	Fairleigh Dickinson	W 85–41	4–0	20 – Strong	9 – Bueckers	6 – Strong	Harry A. Gampel Pavilion (10,299); Storrs, CT
November 25, 2024*; 7:30 p.m., FloHoops	No. 2	vs. Oregon State; Baha Mar Women's Championship semifinals	W 71–52	5–0	23 – Bueckers	8 – Strong	6 – Bueckers	Baha Mar Convention Center (567); Nassau, Bahamas
November 27, 2024*; 7:30 p.m., FloHoops	No. 2	vs. No. 18 Ole Miss; Baha Mar Women's Championship finals	W 73–60	6–0	29 – Bueckers	9 – El Alfy	4 – 2 tied	Baha Mar Convention Center (1,507); Nassau, Bahamas
December 3, 2024*; 7:00 p.m., SNY	No. 2	Holy Cross	W 88–52	7–0	22 – Strong	7 – 2 tied	7 – Chen	Harry A. Gampel Pavilion (10,299); Storrs, CT
December 7, 2024*; 9:00 p.m., FOX	No. 2	vs. No. 22 Louisville; Women's Champions Classic	W 85–52	8–0	21 – Strong	10 – Bueckers	6 – Bueckers	Barclays Center (9,114); Brooklyn, NY
December 12, 2024*; 7:00 p.m., ESPN	No. 2	at No. 8 Notre Dame; Rivalry	L 68–79	8–1	25 – Bueckers	7 – Strong	2 – 4 tied	Purcell Pavilion (9,149); South Bend, IN
December 15, 2024; 1:30 p.m., SNY	No. 2	Georgetown	W 79–44	9–1 (1–0)	24 – Bueckers	14 – Strong	5 – Strong	XL Center (15,684); Hartford, CT
December 17, 2024*; 8:30 p.m., FS1	No. 4	vs. Iowa State; Basketball Hall of Fame Women's Showcase	W 101–68	10–1	29 – Strong	9 – 2 tied	8 – Chen	Mohegan Sun Arena (6,812); Uncasville, CT
December 21, 2024*; 8:00 p.m., FOX	No. 4	No. 7 USC	L 70–72	10–2	22 – 2 tied	13 – Strong	5 – Strong	XL Center (15,684); Hartford, CT
December 29, 2024; 1:30 p.m., SNY	No. 7	Providence	W 67–41	11–2 (2–0)	23 – Bueckers	4 – 2 tied	4 – Bueckers	XL Center (15,684); Hartford, CT
January 1, 2025; 2:00 p.m., SNY	No. 7	at Marquette	W 77–45	12–2 (3–0)	15 – Strong	7 – Strong	7 – Arnold	Al McGuire Center (3,750); Milwaukee, WI
January 5, 2025; 1:30 p.m., SNY	No. 7	at Villanova	W 83–52	13–2 (4–0)	21 – Strong	5 – 3 tied	9 – Bueckers	Finneran Pavilion (6,501); Villanova, PA
January 8, 2025; 7:30 p.m., SNY	No. 7	Xavier	W 81–27	14–2 (5–0)	23 – Fudd	7 – Strong	3 – 4 tied	XL Center (13,529); Hartford, CT
January 11, 2025; 4:00 p.m., SNY	No. 7	at Georgetown	W 73–55	15–2 (6–0)	21 – Fudd	9 – Strong	6 – Strong	Entertainment and Sports Arena (3,827); Washington, D.C.
January 15, 2025; 7:00 p.m., SNY	No. 6	at St. John's	W 71–45	16–2 (7–0)	13 – Fudd	6 – El Alfy	5 – Strong	Carnesecca Arena (4,917); Queens, NY
January 19, 2025; 1:00 p.m., SNY	No. 6	Seton Hall	W 96–36	17–2 (8–0)	23 – Strong	11 – Strong	7 – Bueckers	Harry A. Gampel Pavilion (10,299); Storrs, CT
January 22, 2025; 7:00 p.m., SNY	No. 6	Villanova	W 100–57	18–2 (9–0)	22 – Strong	8 – Bueckers	9 – Bueckers	Harry A. Gampel Pavilion (10,299); Storrs, CT
January 25, 2025; 5:30 p.m., FOX	No. 6	at Creighton	W 72–61	19–2 (10–0)	26 – Strong	12 – Strong	4 – Bueckers	CHI Health Center Omaha (11,141); Omaha, NE
January 29, 2025; 7:00 p.m., SNY	No. 6	at DePaul	W 84–58	20–2 (11–0)	17 – 2 tied	8 – Strong	5 – Fudd	Wintrust Arena (8,305); Chicago, IL
February 2, 2025; 1:00 p.m., SNY	No. 6	Butler	W 101–59	21–2 (12–0)	18 – Bueckers	5 – 2 tied	5 – 3 tied	XL Center (15,684); Hartford, CT
February 6, 2025*; 6:30 p.m., ESPN	No. 5	at No. 19 Tennessee; Rivalry	L 76–80	21–3	18 – Strong	9 – Strong	8 – Bueckers	Thompson-Boling Arena (16,215); Knoxville, TN
February 9, 2025; 12:00 p.m., CBSSN	No. 5	at Providence	W 77–40	22–3 (13–0)	20 – Bueckers	9 – Strong	7 – Arnold	Amica Mutual Pavilion (7,483); Providence, RI
February 12, 2025; 7:30 p.m., SNY	No. 7	St. John's	W 78–40	23–3 (14–0)	34 – Fudd	9 – Griffin	4 – 2 tied	Harry A. Gampel Pavilion (10,299); Storrs, CT
February 16, 2025*; 1:00 p.m., ABC	No. 7	at No. 4 South Carolina; College GameDay	W 87–58	24–3	28 – Fudd	13 – Strong	10 – Bueckers	Colonial Life Arena (18,000); Columbia, SC
February 19, 2025; 7:00 p.m., SNY	No. 5	at Seton Hall	W 91–49	25–3 (15–0)	23 – Bueckers	9 – Bueckers	5 – Bueckers	Walsh Gymnasium (1,350); South Orange, NJ
February 22, 2025; 4:30 p.m., SNY	No. 5	at Butler	W 86–47	26–3 (16–0)	23 – Bueckers	9 – Strong	10 – Bueckers	Hinkle Fieldhouse (9,100); Indianapolis, IN
February 27, 2025; 7:00 p.m., CBSSN	No. 5	No. 22 Creighton	W 72–53	27–3 (17–0)	22 – Strong	9 – Strong	7 – Bueckers	XL Center (15,684); Hartford, CT
March 2, 2025; 2:00 p.m., FS1	No. 5	Marquette	W 92–57	28–3 (18–0)	19 – Bueckers	5 – Strong	7 – Bueckers	Harry A. Gampel Pavilion (10,299); Storrs, CT
Big East tournament
March 8, 2025; 12:00 p.m., FS1	(1) No. 3	vs. (8) St. John's; Quarterfinals	W 71–40	29–3	20 – Bueckers	14 – Strong	4 – 2 tied	Mohegan Sun Arena (8,816); Uncasville, CT
March 9, 2025; 2:30 p.m., FOX	(1) No. 3	vs. (5) Villanova; Semifinals	W 82–54	30–3	23 – Bueckers	16 – Strong	6 – Bueckers	Mohegan Sun Arena; Uncasville, CT
March 10, 2025; 7:00 p.m., FS1	(1) No. 3	vs. (2) No. 22 Creighton; Championship	W 70–50	31–3	24 – Bueckers	11 – Strong	4 – Strong	Mohegan Sun Arena; Uncasville, CT
NCAA tournament
March 22, 2025*; 1:00 p.m., ABC	(2 S4) No. 3	(15 S4) Arkansas State; First Round	W 103–34	32–3	27 – Fudd	12 – Strong	7 – Fudd	Harry A. Gampel Pavilion (10,299); Storrs, CT
March 24, 2025*; 8:00 p.m., ESPN	(2 S4) No. 3	(10 S4) No. 24 South Dakota State; Second Round	W 91–57	33–3	34 – Bueckers	7 – Strong	5 – 2 tied	Harry A. Gampel Pavilion (10,299); Storrs, CT
March 29, 2025*; 5:30 p.m., ESPN	(2 S4) No. 3	vs. (3 S4) No. 11 Oklahoma; Sweet Sixteen	W 82–59	34–3	40 – Bueckers	11 – Strong	5 – 2 tied	Spokane Arena (10,610); Spokane, WA
March 31, 2025*; 9:00 p.m., ESPN	(2 S4) No. 3	vs. (1 S4) No. 4 USC; Elite Eight	W 78–64	35–3	31 – Bueckers	17 – Strong	6 – Bueckers	Spokane Arena (10,141); Spokane, WA
April 4, 2025*; 9:30 p.m., ESPN	(2 S4) No. 3	vs. (1 S1) No. 1 UCLA; Final Four	W 85–51	36–3	22 – Strong	8 – 2 tied	5 – Chen	Amalie Arena (19,731); Tampa, FL
April 6, 2025*; 3:00 p.m., ABC	(2 S4) No. 3	vs. (1 B2) No. 2 South Carolina; National Championship	W 82–59	37–3	24 – 2 tied	15 – Strong	5 – Strong	Amalie Arena (19,777); Tampa, FL
*Non-conference game. ^{#}Rankings from AP Poll. (#) Tournament seedings in parentheses. All times are in Eastern Time.

== Rankings ==
Ranking movements Legend: ██ Increase in ranking ██ Decrease in ranking ( ) = First-place votes
	Week																				
Poll	Pre	1	2	3	4	5	6	7	8	9	10	11	12	13	14	15	16	17	18	19	Final
AP	2 (2)	2	2	2 (9)	2 (7)	2 (8)	4	7	7	7	6	6	6	5	7	5	5	3	3 (7)	3 (5)	1 (31)
Coaches	2 (3)	2 (1)	2 (1)	1 (13)	2 (14)	2 (8)	5	7	8	8	6	6	6	5	7	5	5	3	3 (3)	3 (3)	1 (31)

== Player statistics ==
Player	Games Played	Minutes	Field Goals	Three Pointers	Free Throws	Rebounds	Assists	Blocks	Steals	Points
Sarah Strong	40	1149	272	59	54	356	142	66	92	657
Paige Bueckers	38	1146	287	70	112	168	176	29	81	756
Kaitlyn Chen	40	938	108	29	32	71	135	1	46	277
Azzi Fudd	34	901	175	79	33	68	61	10	46	462
Ashlynn Shade	40	887	120	53	15	108	53	6	57	308
KK Arnold	40	855	82	10	42	95	112	4	61	218
Jana El-Alfy	40	639	86	1	27	203	40	24	22	200
Ice Brady	32	500	47	3	17	90	55	12	18	114
Morgan Cheli	24	318	25	10	1	58	30	1	9	61
Allie Ziebell	33	271	32	22	6	18	11	2	6	92
Qadence Samuels	33	185	16	6	5	28	2	4	6	43
Aubrey Griffin	16	177	25	0	20	54	14	6	8	70
Caroline Ducharme	9	34	5	1	0	6	2	0	1	11

== Awards and honors ==
- Paige Bueckers
  - Wade Trophy
  - Honda Sport Award for Basketball
  - Nancy Lieberman Award
  - Associated Press first-team All-American
  - United States Basketball Writers Association first-team All-American
  - Women's Basketball Coaches Association All-American
  - Big East Player of the Year
  - First-team All-Big East
  - Big East tournament Most Outstanding Player
- Sarah Strong
  - Associated Press second-team All-American
  - United States Basketball Writers Association third-team All-American
  - Women's Basketball Coaches Association All-American
  - WBCA Freshman of the Year
  - First-team All-Big East
  - Big East Freshman of the Year
  - Big East All-Freshman Team
- Azzi Fudd
  - NCAA Division I tournament Most Outstanding Player
  - First-team All-Big East
- Ashlynn Shade
  - Big East Sixth Woman of the Year
- Geno Auriemma
  - Big East Co-Coach of the Year

== See also ==
- 2024–25 UConn Huskies men's basketball team
