= 2024–25 Marquette Golden Eagles women's basketball team =

American college team

2024–25 Marquette Golden Eagles women's basketball
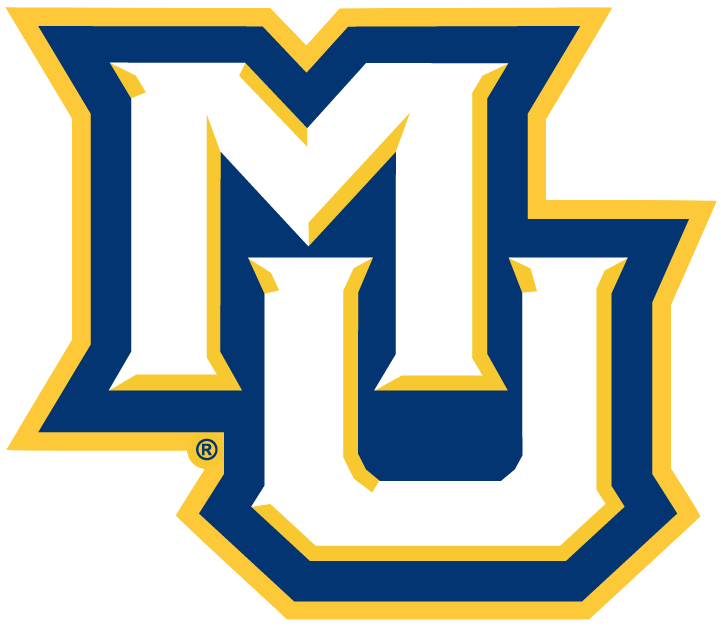

WBIT, second round
- Conference: Big East Conference
- Record: 21–11 (12–6 Big East)
- Head coach: Cara Consuegra (1st season)
- Assistant coaches: Deont'a McChester; Khadijah Rushdan; Chaia Huff
- Home arena: Al McGuire Center

2024–25 Big East women's basketball standings
	Conf.				Overall
Team	W		L	PCT	W		L	PCT
No. 1 UConn †	18	–	0	1.000	37	–	3	.925
No. 23 Creighton	16	–	2	.889	26	–	7	.788
Seton Hall	13	–	5	.722	23	–	10	.697
Marquette	12	–	6	.667	21	–	11	.656
Villanova	11	–	7	.611	21	–	15	.583
DePaul	8	–	10	.444	13	–	19	.406
Providence	6	–	12	.333	13	–	19	.406
St. John's	5	–	13	.278	16	–	15	.516
Butler	5	–	13	.278	16	–	18	.471
Georgetown	4	–	14	.222	12	–	19	.387
Xavier	1	–	17	.056	7	–	24	.226
† 2025 Big East tournament winner Rankings from AP poll

The 2024–25 Marquette Golden Eagles women's basketball team represented Marquette University during the 2024–25 NCAA Division I women's basketball season. The Golden Eagles, led by first-year head coach Cara Consuegra, played their home games at the Al McGuire Center as members of the Big East Conference.

== Previous season ==
The Golden Eagles finished the 2023–24 season 23–9, 13–7 in Big East play to finish in a three-way tie for third place. As a No. 5 seed in the Big East tournament, they defeated Villanova in the quarterfinals before losing to UConn in the semifinals. They received an at-large bid to the NCAA tournament as a No. 10 seed in the Albany Regional 1, where they lost in the first round to No. 7 seed Ole Miss.

== Offseason ==
=== Departures ===
Marquette departures
Name	Num	Pos.	Height	Year	Hometown	Reason for departure
Rose Nkumu	3	G	5'9"	Senior	Iowa City, IA	Graduated
Claire Kaifes	10	G	6'0"	Senior	Shawnee, KS	Graduated
Mackenzie Hare	12	G	5'9"	Sophomore	Naperville, IL	Enter transfer portal
Fannie Hottinger	20	G/F	6'1"	Graduate student	Inver Grove Heights, MN	Graduated
Jordan King	23	G	5'11"	Senior	Rockton, IL	Graduated
Liza Karlen	32	F	6'2"	Senior	Saint Paul, MN	Transferred to Notre Dame

=== Incoming transfers ===
Marquette incoming transfers
Name	Num	Pos.	Height	Year	Hometown	Previous school
Jaidynn Mason	2	G	5'9"	Junior	Blue Springs, MO	Southern Illinois
Jada Bediako	14	F/C	6'3"	Sophomore	Brapton, ON	Georgia Tech
Kennedi Perkins	21	G	5'6"	Junior	Bolingbrook, IL	Syracuse
Olivia Porter	23	G	5'8"	Junior	Chapel Hill, NC	Charlotte
Ayuen Akot	24	G/F	5'10"	Junior	Melbourne, Australia	Frank Phillips College
Aryelle Stevens	35	G/F	6'1"	Junior	Pearland, TX	Gulf Coast State College

==== Recruiting ====
College recruiting
Name	Hometown	School	Height	Weight	Commit date
Jaeda Wilson; PG	Potomac, MD	Connelly School of Holy Child	5 ft 9 in (1.75 m)	N/A	
Jaeda Wilson; PG	Recruit ratings: ESPN: (91)				
Overall recruit ranking:
Note: In many cases, Scout, Rivals, 247Sports, On3, and ESPN may conflict in their listings of height and weight.; In these cases, the average was taken. ESPN grades are on a 100-point scale.; Sources: "2024 Player Commits". ESPN. Archived from the original on December 29, 2024.

== Roster ==
2024–25 Marquette Golden Eagles women's basketball team
Players
Coaches

Pos.	#	Name	Height	Year	Previous school	Hometown
G	1	Lee Volker	6 ft 1 in (1.85 m)	Sr	Duke	Purcellville, Virginia
G	2	Jaidynn Mason	5 ft 6 in (1.68 m)	Jr	Southern Illinois	Kansas City, Missouri
F	4	Abbey Cracknell	5 ft 11 in (1.8 m)	Sr	Gulf Coast State College	Avoca Beach, Australia
F	5	Charia Smith	6 ft 1 in (1.85 m)	RS So	Northland High School	Columbus, Ohio
G	7	Bridget Utberg	5 ft 5 in (1.65 m)	Jr	Central Michigan	Canton, Georgia
F	11	Skylar Forbes	6 ft 3 in (1.91 m)	So	Scarborough Prep	Markham, Ontario
F	14	Jada Bediako	6 ft 3 in (1.91 m)	Fr	Georgia Tech	Brampton, Ontario
G	21	Kennedi Perkins	5 ft 6 in (1.68 m)	Jr	Syracuse	Bolingbrook, Illinois
G	22	Halle Vice	6 ft 1 in (1.85 m)	So	Pleasant Valley High School	Bettendorf, Iowa
G	23	Olivia Porter	5 ft 8 in (1.73 m)	Jr	Charlotte	Chapel Hill, North Carolina
F	24	Ayuen Akot	5 ft 11 in (1.8 m)	Jr	Frank Phillips College	Melbourne, Australia
F	35	Aryelle Stevens	6 ft 1 in (1.85 m)	Jr	Gulf Coast State College	Pearland, Texas

Head coach

- Cara Consuegra (Iowa)

Assistant coach(es)

- Deont'a McChester (Keuka)
- Khadijah Rushdan (Rutgers)
- Chaia Huff (Moody Bible)

Legend

- (C) Team captain
- (S) Suspended
- (I) Ineligible
- (W) Walk-on
- Injured
- Current redshirt

Roster

== Schedule and results ==
Date time, TV	Rank^{#}	Opponent^{#}	Result	Record	High points	High rebounds	High assists	Site (attendance) city, state
Non-conference regular season
November 7, 2024*; 6:00 p.m., ESPN+		at UCF	L 50–57	0–1	14 – Porter	6 – Volker	3 – Forbes	Addition Financial Arena (1,107); Orlando, FL
November 10, 2024*; 7:00 p.m., BTN		at Illinois	L 53–65	0–2	18 – Volker	8 – Volker	3 – Tied	State Farm Center (3,748); Champaign, IL
November 18, 2024*; 11:30 a.m., FloCollege		Illinois–Springfield	W 92–37	1–2	18 – Forbes	8 – Forbes	3 – Tied	Al McGuire Center (3,750); Milwaukee, WI
November 24, 2024*; 12:00 p.m., FloCollege		IU Indy	W 83–50	2–2	15 – Forbes	11 – Vice	4 – Tied	Al McGuire Center (1,502); Milwaukee, WI
November 29, 2024*; 1:00 p.m., BTN		at Rutgers; Battle on the Banks	W 59–57	3–2	23 – Forbes	7 – Volker	5 – Perkins	Jersey Mike's Arena (1,651); Piscataway, NJ
November 30, 2024*; 3:30 p.m., B1G+		vs. Maryland Eastern Shore; Battle on the Banks	W 74–48	4–2	18 – Forbes	8 – Forbes	3 – Tied	Jersey Mike's Arena (1,703); Piscataway, NJ
December 3, 2024*; 6:30 p.m., FloCollege		Indiana State	W 83–67	5–2	20 – Vice	9 – Tied	6 – Mason	Al McGuire Center (1,166); Milwaukee, WI
December 8, 2024*; 2:00 p.m., FloCollege		Illinois State	W 78–57	6–2	17 – Forbes	10 – Forbes	7 – Porter	Al McGuire Center (1,814); Milwaukee, WI
December 15, 2024*; 2:00 p.m., FloCollege		Milwaukee	W 69–51	7–2	21 – Volker	7 – Tied	7 – Porter	Al McGuire Center (2,448); Milwaukee, WI
December 18, 2024*; 6:00 p.m., ESPN+		at Bowling Green	L 62–64	7–3	17 – Tied	10 – Volker	5 – Porter	Stroh Center (1,892); Bowling Green, OH
December 21, 2024*; 12:00 p.m., FloCollege		Stonehill	W 87–42	8–3	25 – Forbes	10 – Forbes	5 – Tied	Al McGuire Center (1,950); Milwaukee, WI
Big East regular season
December 29, 2024; 2:00 p.m., FloCollege		at DePaul	W 78–59	9–3 (1–0)	18 – Forbes	11 – Vice	6 – Mason	Wintrust Arena (1,798); Chicago, IL
January 1, 2025; 1:00 p.m., SNY		No. 7 UConn	L 45–77	9–4 (1–1)	20 – Forbes	11 – Vice	4 – Porter	Al McGuire Center (3,750); Milwaukee, WI
January 4, 2025; 3:00 p.m., FS1		Butler	W 57–54	10–4 (2–1)	21 – Forbes	6 – Tied	3 – Tied	Al McGuire Center (3,109); Milwaukee, WI
January 8, 2025; 6:00 p.m., FloCollege		at Creighton	L 68–71	10–5 (2–2)	19 – Volker	7 – Vice	6 – Porter	D. J. Sokol Arena (1,290); Omaha, NE
January 11, 2025; 2:00 p.m., FloCollege		Villanova	W 64–59	11–5 (3–2)	20 – Vice	12 – Vice	4 – Volker	Al McGuire Center (3,012); Milwaukee, WI
January 15, 2025; 8:00 p.m., FS1		Seton Hall	L 52–58	11–6 (3–3)	13 – Volker	8 – Vice	4 – Mason	Al McGuire Center (2,126); Milwaukee, WI
January 22, 2025; 10:00 a.m., FloCollege		at Providence	W 67–54	12–6 (4–3)	23 – Forbes	11 – Vice	4 – Tied	Alumni Hall (1,456); Providence, RI
January 25, 2025; 2:00 p.m., FloCollege		Georgetown	W 75–58	13–6 (5–3)	20 – Volker	8 – Vice	6 – Volker	Al McGuire Center (1,962); Milwaukee, WI
January 29, 2025; 6:00 p.m., FloCollege		at Xavier	W 67–38	14–6 (6–3)	20 – Volker	7 – Volker	6 – Porter	Cintas Center (1,085); Cincinnati, OH
February 2, 2025; 1:00 p.m., FloCollege		at Villanova	L 53–65	14–7 (6–4)	20 – Vice	11 – Porter	6 – Porter	Finneran Pavilion (2,335); Villanova, PA
February 5, 2025; 6:30 p.m., FloCollege		St. John's	W 57–55	15–7 (7–4)	15 – Forbes	10 – Vice	3 – Tied	Al McGuire Center (1,479); Milwaukee, WI
February 9, 2025; 1:00 p.m., FloCollege		at Butler	L 65–67	15–8 (7–5)	14 – Forbes	5 – Tied	5 – Volker	Hinkle Fieldhouse (1,812); Indianapolis, IN
February 12, 2025; 6:00 p.m., FloCollege		at Seton Hall	W 68–61	16–8 (8–5)	24 – Volker	13 – Vice	6 – Mason	Walsh Gymnasium (970); South Orange, NJ
February 15, 2025; 2:00 p.m., FloCollege		DePaul	W 82–72	17–8 (9–5)	26 – Forbes	9 – Forbes	6 – Volker	Al McGuire Center (2,512); Milwaukee, WI
February 19, 2025; 6:30 p.m., FloCollege		Providence	W 69–51	18–8 (10–5)	14 – Volker	5 – Vice	4 – Tied	Al McGuire Center (1,853); Milwaukee, WI
February 22, 2025; 6:00 p.m., FloCollege		at Georgetown	W 55–50	19–8 (11–5)	18 – Mason	12 – Vice	4 – Mason	McDonough Gymnasium (1,363); Washington, D.C.
February 27, 2025; 6:30 p.m., FloCollege		Xavier	W 62–37	20–8 (12–5)	15 – Tied	8 – Forbes	4 – Tied	Al McGuire Center (2,297); Milwaukee, WI
March 2, 2025; 1:00 p.m., FS1		at No. 5 UConn	L 57–92	20–9 (12–6)	13 – Mason	4 – Vice	2 – Tied	Harry A. Gampel Pavilion (10,299); Storrs, CT
Big East Women's Tournament
March 8, 2025; 1:30 p.m., FS2	(5)	vs. (4) Villanova; Quarterfinals	L 66–73	20–10	23 – Forbes	9 – Vice	3 – Tied	Mohegan Sun Arena (8,816); Uncasville, CT
WBIT
March 20, 2025*; 2:00 p.m., ESPN+		at (4) Drake; First round	W 74–69	21–10	18 – Tied	7 – Porter	6 – Mason	Knapp Center (1,959); Des Moines, Iowa
March 23, 2025*; 3:00 p.m., ESPN+		at (1) James Madison; Second round	L 76–80 ^{OT}	21–11	25 – Forbes	11 – Vice	5 – Mason	Atlantic Union Bank Center (1,239); Harrisonburg, VA
*Non-conference game. ^{#}Rankings from AP Poll. (#) Tournament seedings in parentheses. All times are in Central Time.

== Rankings ==
Ranking movements
	Week																				
Poll	Pre	1	2	3	4	5	6	7	8	9	10	11	12	13	14	15	16	17	18	19	Final
AP																					Not released
Coaches																					

== See also ==
- 2024–25 Marquette Golden Eagles men's basketball team
