= 2024–25 Providence Friars women's basketball team =

Intercollegiate basketball season

2024–25 Providence Friars women's basketball
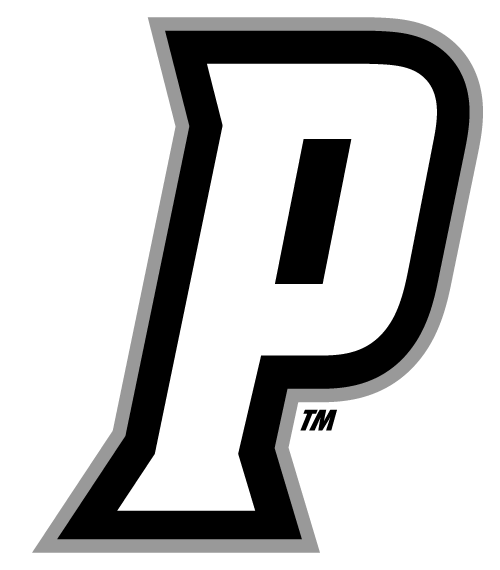
- Conference: Big East Conference
- Record: 13–19 (6–12 Big East)
- Head coach: Erin Batth (2nd season)
- Assistant coaches: Valerie Nainima; Kaili McLaren; Reyna Frost; Molly Reagan
- Home arena: Alumni Hall

2024–25 Big East women's basketball standings
	Conf.				Overall
Team	W		L	PCT	W		L	PCT
No. 1 UConn †	18	–	0	1.000	37	–	3	.925
No. 23 Creighton	16	–	2	.889	26	–	7	.788
Seton Hall	13	–	5	.722	23	–	10	.697
Marquette	12	–	6	.667	21	–	11	.656
Villanova	11	–	7	.611	21	–	15	.583
DePaul	8	–	10	.444	13	–	19	.406
Providence	6	–	12	.333	13	–	19	.406
St. John's	5	–	13	.278	16	–	15	.516
Butler	5	–	13	.278	16	–	18	.471
Georgetown	4	–	14	.222	12	–	19	.387
Xavier	1	–	17	.056	7	–	24	.226
† 2025 Big East tournament winner Rankings from AP poll

The 2024–25 Providence Friars women's basketball team represented Providence College in the 2024–25 NCAA Division I women's basketball season. The Friars, led by second-year head coach Erin Batth, played their home games at Alumni Hall as members of the Big East Conference.

== Previous season ==
The Friars finished the 2023–24 season 13–21, 6–12 in Big East play to finish in a tie for eighth place. As the No. 9 seed in the Big East tournament, they defeated Georgetown in the first round before losing to UConn. They received an at-large bid to the WNIT, where they lost in the second round to Colgate.

== Offseason ==
=== Departures ===
Providence departures
Name	Num	Pos.	Height	Year	Hometown	Reason for departure
Sahana Kanagasabay	3	G	5'11"	Freshman	Surrey, BC	Transferred to UC Davis
Bella McLaughlin	12	G	5'6"	Freshman	Hampden, ME	Transferred to Boston University
Kammie Ludwig	30	G	5'10"	Sophomore	Geneseo, IL	Transferred to St. Thomas (MN)
Kendall Eddy	32	G	5'7"	Freshman	Haverhill, MA	Transferred to Holy Cross
Laryn Edwards	99	G	5'6"	Graduate student	Allison Park, PA	Graduated

=== Incoming transfers ===
Providence incoming transfers
Name	Num	Pos.	Height	Year	Hometown	Previous school
MacKayla Scarlett	15	G	5'10"	Graduate student	Bronx, NY	Xavier

==== Recruiting ====
There was no recruiting class of 2024.

== Roster ==
2024–25 Providence Friars women's basketball team
Players
Coaches

Pos.	#	Name	Height	Year	Previous school	Hometown
G	1	Kylee Sheppard	5 ft 9 in (1.75 m)	Sr	Roger Bacon	Cincinnati, OH
G	2	Grace Efosa	5 ft 11 in (1.8 m)	GS	Whittier Tech	Lawrence, MA
G	3	Orlagh Gormley	5 ft 6 in (1.68 m)	Fr	Dexter Southfield	Quincy, MA
G	5	Sophi Hall	6 ft 1 in (1.85 m)	So	Holy Family HS	Carver, MN
F	10	Ugne Sirtautaite	6 ft 1 in (1.85 m)	So		Kaunas, Lithuania
G	11	Nariah Scott	5 ft 10 in (1.78 m)	Sr	Tabor Academy	Holden, MA
G/F	13	Marta Morales Romero	6 ft 1 in (1.85 m)	Sr	Segle XXI; Wake Forest	Granada, Spain
G	15	Mackayla Scarlett	5 ft 10 in (1.78 m)	GS	St. Francis Prep; Xavier	Bronx, New York
G	22	Brynn Farrell	6 ft 0 in (1.83 m)	GS	St. Rose HS; Florida	Ortley Beach, NJ
F	23	Sarah Bandoma	6 ft 3 in (1.91 m)	Sr	Johnston Senior HS; St. Francis Brooklyn	Johnston, RI
G	24	Audrey Koch	5 ft 10 in (1.78 m)	Sr	Iowa City West	Iowa City, IA
F	31	Olivia Olsen	6 ft 3 in (1.91 m)	Sr	Niskayuna	Niskayuna, NY
F	33	Emily Archibald	6 ft 0 in (1.83 m)	Sr	Kennebunk	Kennebunk, MA
G/F	34	Audrey Shields	6 ft 1 in (1.85 m)	Fr	Emma Willard	Troy, MY

Head coach

- Erin Batth (Clemson)

Assistant coach(es)

- Valerie Nainima (South Carolina)
- Kaili McLaren (Connecticut)
- Reyna Frost (Central Michigan)
- Molly Reagan (Liberty)

Legend

- (C) Team captain
- (S) Suspended
- (I) Ineligible
- (W) Walk-on
- Injured
- Current redshirt

Roster

== Schedule and results ==
Date time, TV	Rank^{#}	Opponent^{#}	Result	Record	High points	High rebounds	High assists	Site (attendance) city, state
Exhibition
October 29, 2024*; 7:00 p.m.		Southern Connecticut State	W 66–39		–	–	–	Alumni Hall; Providence, RI
Non-conference regular season
November 4, 2024*; 7:00 p.m., FloHoops		Mercy	W 64–32	1–0	12 – Olsen	10 – Olse	3 – Farrell	Alumni Hall (261); Providence, RI
November 8, 2024*; 7:00 p.m., FloHoops		Columbia	L 69–77 ^{OT}	1–1	18 – Efosa	8 – Olsen	4 – Gormley	Alumni Hall (926); Providence, RI
November 12, 2024*; 6:00 p.m., ESPN+		at Vermont	W 58–53	2–1	20 – Efosa	6 – Olsen	3 – Sheppard	Patrick Gym (790); Burlington, VT
November 17, 2024*; 12:00 p.m., ACCNX		at Boston College	L 60–67	2–2	15 – Efosa	18 – Olsen	3 – Gormley	Conte Forum (1,562); Chestnut Hill, MA
November 21, 2024*; 7:00 p.m., ESPN+		at Dayton	L 61–65	2–3	22 – Efosa	6 – Tied	4 – Morales Romero	UD Arena (1,457); Dayton, OH
November 24, 2024*; 2:00 p.m., ESPN+		Delaware	W 60–53	3–3	14 – Efosa	9 – Olsen	3 – Tied	Alumni Hall (825); Providence, RI
November 28, 2024*; 11:00 a.m., FloHoops		vs. VCU; Cancún Challenge Mayan Division	L 51–57	3–4	12 – Efosa	6 – Archibald	3 – Gormley	Hard Rock Hotel Riviera Maya (250); Cancún, Mexico
November 29, 2024*; 11:00 a.m., FloHoops		vs. Wisconsin; Cancún Challenge Mayan Division	L 57–66	3–5	21 – Efosa	11 – Olsen	3 – Sheppard	Hard Rock Hotel Riviera Maya (214); Cancún, Mexico
November 30, 2024*; 11:00 a.m., FloHoops		vs. San Diego State; Cancún Challenge Mayan Division	W 55–54	4–5	14 – Efosa	11 – Archibald	2 – Efosa	Hard Rock Hotel Riviera Maya (100); Cancún, Mexico
December 4, 2024*; 6:30 p.m., ESPN+		at Rhode Island	W 48–45	5–5	18 – Efosa	7 – Olsen	2 – Tied	Ryan Center (1,075); Kingston, RI
December 7, 2024*; 2:00 p.m., FloHoops		Brown	W 87–81 ^{OT}	6–5	27 – Tied	6 – Efosa	6 – Gormley	Alumni Hall (725); Providence, RI
December 11, 2024*; 7:00 p.m., FloHoops		Penn State	L 51–68	6–6	15 – Efosa	7 – Tied	3 – Efosa	Alumni Hall (1,145); Providence, RI
December 14, 2024*; 12:00 p.m., FloHoops		Merrimack	W 62–44	7–6	16 – Olsen	11 – Olsen	5 – Efosa	Alumni Hall (705); Providence, RI
Big East regular season
December 21, 2024; 1:00 p.m., FloHoops		at Seton Hall	L 40–51	7–7 (0–1)	20 – Efosa	13 – Olsen	3 – Tied	Walsh Gymnasium (686); South Orange, NJ
December 29, 2024; 1:30 p.m., SNY		at No. 7 UConn	L 41–67	7–8 (0–2)	11 – Efosa	11 – Olsen	1 – Tied	XL Center (15,684); Hartford, CT
January 1, 2025; 2:00 p.m., FloHoops		St. John's	W 59–52 ^{OT}	8–8 (1–2)	17 – Morales Romero	8 – Olsen	3 – Tied	Alumni Hall (817); Providence, RI
January 4, 2025; 2:00 p.m., FloHoops		Creighton	L 46–60	8–9 (1–3)	8 – Efosa	6 – Tied	5 – Efosa	Alumni Hall (783); Providence, RI
January 8, 2025; 7:00 p.m., FloHoops		at Butler	L 47–57	8–10 (1–4)	13 – Olsen	5 – Tied	3 – Tied	Hinkle Fieldhouse (787); Indianapolis, IN
January 12, 2025; 3:00 p.m., FloHoops		at DePaul	L 56–62	8–11 (1–5)	18 – Morales Romero	11 – Farrell	3 – Archibald	Wintrust Arena (1,462); Chicago, IL
January 15, 2025; 7:00 p.m., FloHoops		Xavier	W 51–45	9–11 (2–5)	21 – Olsen	10 – Olsen	5 – Morales Romero	Alumni Hall (703); Providence, RI
January 18, 2025; 2:00 p.m., FloHoops		Georgetown	L 48–60	9–12 (2–6)	10 – Tied	8 – Efosa	3 – Scott	Alumni Hall (1,184); Providence, RI
January 22, 2025; 11:00 a.m., FloHoops		Marquette	L 54–67	9–13 (2–7)	15 – Scarlett	5 – Tied	4 – Farrell	Alumni Hall (1,456); Providence, RI
January 29, 2025; 7:00 p.m., FloHoops		at St. John's	L 55–62	9–14 (2–8)	14 – Olsen	11 – Olsen	3 – Olsen	Carnesecca Arena (530); Queens, NY
February 2, 2025; 2:00 p.m., FS1		at Creighton	L 66–79	9–15 (2–9)	22 – Olsen	10 – Olsen	4 – Tied	D. J. Sokol Arena (2,239); Omaha, NE
February 6, 2025; 7:00 p.m., FloHoops		DePaul	W 76–63	10–15 (3–9)	27 – Efosa	15 – Olsen	3 – Morales Romero	Alumni Hall (795); Providence, RI
February 9, 2025; 12:00 p.m., CBSSN		No. 5 UConn	L 40–77	10–16 (3–10)	15 – Morales Romero	10 – Olsen	2 – Scott	Amica Mutual Pavilion (7,483); Providence, RI
February 12, 2025; 7:00 p.m., FloHoops		at Xavier	W 61–53	11–16 (4–10)	15 – Tied	9 – Olsen	5 – Farrell	Cintas Center (1,071); Cincinnati, OH
February 16, 2025; 2:00 p.m., FloHoops		Seton Hall	L 38–59	11–17 (4–11)	10 – Farrell	7 – Olsen	3 – Morales	Alumni Hall (844); Providence, RI
February 19, 2025; 7:30 p.m., FloHoops		at Marquette	L 51–69	11–18 (4–12)	17 – Olsen	10 – Olsen	6 – Morales	Al McGuire Center (1,853); Milwaukee, WI
February 23, 2025; 12:00 p.m., FS1		Villanova	W 63–56	12–18 (5–12)	18 – Olsen	12 – Olsen	8 – Farrell	Alumni Hall (1,051); Providence, RI
March 1, 2025; 12:00 p.m., FS1		at Georgetown	W 66–62	13–18 (6–12)	19 – Efosa	8 – Morales	5 – Morales	McDonough Arena (617); Washington, D.C.
Big East Tournament
March 7, 2025; 1:30 p.m., BEDN	(7)	vs. (10) Georgetown; First Round	L 56–58	13–19	21 – Olsen	8 – Efosa	6 – Morales	Mohegan Sun Arena; Uncasville, CT
*Non-conference game. ^{#}Rankings from AP Poll. (#) Tournament seedings in parentheses. All times are in Eastern.

== See also ==
- 2024–25 Providence Friars men's basketball team
