= 2024–25 Xavier Musketeers women's basketball team =

American college basketball season

2024–25 Xavier Musketeers women's basketball
- Conference: Big East Conference
- Record: 7–24 (1–17 Big East)
- Head coach: Billi Chambers (2nd season)
- Associate head coach: Ashlee Kelly
- Assistant coaches: Brianna Sanders; Myia Johnson
- Home arena: Cintas Center

2024–25 Big East women's basketball standings
	Conf.				Overall
Team	W		L	PCT	W		L	PCT
No. 1 UConn †	18	–	0	1.000	37	–	3	.925
No. 23 Creighton	16	–	2	.889	26	–	7	.788
Seton Hall	13	–	5	.722	23	–	10	.697
Marquette	12	–	6	.667	21	–	11	.656
Villanova	11	–	7	.611	21	–	15	.583
DePaul	8	–	10	.444	13	–	19	.406
Providence	6	–	12	.333	13	–	19	.406
St. John's	5	–	13	.278	16	–	15	.516
Butler	5	–	13	.278	16	–	18	.471
Georgetown	4	–	14	.222	12	–	19	.387
Xavier	1	–	17	.056	7	–	24	.226
† 2025 Big East tournament winner Rankings from AP poll

The 2024–25 Xavier Musketeers women's basketball team represent Xavier University during the 2024–25 NCAA Division I women's basketball season. The Musketeers, led by second-year head coach Billi Chambers, play their home games at the Cintas Center in Cincinnati, Ohio as a member of the Big East Conference.

== Previous season ==
The Musketeers finished the season 1–27, 0–18 in Big East play to finish in last place. As a No. 11 seed, they lost in the first round to Georgetown of the Big East women's tournament.

== Offseason ==
=== Departures ===
Xavier departures
Name	Num	Pos.	Height	Year	Hometown	Reason for departure
Shelby Calhoun	0	G	5'11"	Senior	Louisville, KY	Transferred to Stetson
Taylor Smith	3	G	5'8"	Graduate student	Marietta, GA	Graduated
Nila Blackford	4	F	6'2"	Graduate student	Louisville, KY	Graduated
Aby Shubert	11	G	5'8"	Freshman	Kasson, MN	Transferred to Montana
Kaysia Woods	12	G	6'0"	Junior	Lincoln, Nebraska	Transferred to SMU
Lika Kvirkvelia	13	C	6'4"	Freshman	Kobuleti, Georgia	TBD
Mackayla Scarlett	15	G	5'10"	Senior	Bronx, NY	Transferred to Providence
Bella Ward	22	F	5'11"	Sophomore	Blacklick, OH	TBD
Aanaya Harris	23	G/F	5'11"	Junior	Omaha, NE	Transferred to Charlotte
Delaney Hogan	24	G/F	6'0"	Senior	Fort Wayne, IN	Transferred to Kentucky
Daniela López	44	G	5'8"	Freshman	Barcelona, Spain	TBD

=== Incoming transfers ===
Xavier incoming transfers
Name	Num	Pos.	Height	Year	Hometown	Previous school
Petra Oborilova	15	F	6'2"	Junior	Banská Bystrica, Slovakia	Iona

==== Recruiting ====
There was no recruiting class of 2024.

== Roster ==
2024–25 Xavier Musketeers women's basketball team
Players
Coaches

Pos.	#	Name	Height	Year	Previous school	Hometown
F	1	Loren Christie	6 ft 3 in (1.91 m)	GS	Buffalo; San Francisco	London, England
G	2	Aizhanique Mayo	5 ft 9 in (1.75 m)	RS So	Notre Dame High School; Marquette; Iona	Bridgeport, Connecticut
G	4	Júlia Garcia Roig	5 ft 7 in (1.7 m)	So	Ipsi	Barcelona, Spain
G	5	Tae'lor Purvis	5 ft 7 in (1.7 m)	GS	Houston	Houston, Texas
G	7	Daniela López	5 ft 10 in (1.78 m)	So	UE Mataró	Barcelona, Spain
G	8	Meri Kanerva	5 ft 9 in (1.75 m)	Fr	Mäkelänrinne Upper Secondary	Espoo, Finland
G	11	Phoebe Holmes	5 ft 7 in (1.7 m)	Fr	Mackay North State	North Mackay, Australia
G/F	12	MacKenzie Givens	5 ft 8 in (1.73 m)	Fr	Princeton	Cincinnati, Ohio
F	15	Petra Oborilova	6 ft 2 in (1.88 m)	Jr	Stredná Športová Škola; Iona	Banská Bystrica, Slovakia
G	20	Vivien Nejasmic	6 ft 0 in (1.83 m)	Fr	Linigra	Split, Croatia
G	21	Olivia Borsutzki	5 ft 11 in (1.8 m)	Fr	Neuhof	Munich, Germany
F	23	Jordan Miller	6 ft 1 in (1.85 m)	GS	Hoover; Youngstown State	North Canton, Ohio
G/F	24	Lucía Martínez López	6 ft 1 in (1.85 m)	Fr	Colegio Internacional San Fernando	Oviedo, Spain
F	26	Jovana Nicolic	6 ft 2 in (1.88 m)	Fr	Prva ekonomska skola	Belgrade, Serbia
G	31	Irune Orio	6 ft 2 in (1.88 m)	Jr	IES Balmaseda BHI; Sacramento State	Balmaseda, Spain

Head coach

- Billi Chambers (Hofstra)

Assistant coach(es)

- Ashlee Kelly (Quinnipiac)
- Brianna Sanders (Ohio State)
- Myia Johnson (Rutgers)

Legend

- (C) Team captain
- (S) Suspended
- (I) Ineligible
- (W) Walk-on
- Injured
- Current redshirt

Roster
Last update: November 30, 2024

== Schedule and results ==
Date time, TV	Rank^{#}	Opponent^{#}	Result	Record	High points	High rebounds	High assists	Site (attendance) city, state
Regular season
November 5, 2024*; 5:00 p.m., FloCollege		San Jose State	L 36–55	0–1	8 – Garcia Roig	5 – Mayo	3 – Purvis	Cintas Center (347); Cincinnati, OH
November 10, 2024*; 1:00 p.m., FloCollege		Miami (OH)	W 71–66	1–1	15 – Martínez López	9 – Christie	6 – Oborilova	Cintas Center (428); Cincinnati, OH
November 15, 2024*; 7:00 p.m., FloCollege		Mercyhurst	W 68–53	2–1	18 – Christie	8 – Christie	6 – Oborilova	Cintas Center (604); Cincinnati, OH
November 19, 2024*; 7:00 p.m., FloCollege		Arkansas State	W 45–41	3–1	8 – Christie	7 – Christie	5 – Purvis	Cintas Center (256); Cincinnati, OH
November 23, 2024*; 1:00 p.m., ESPN+		at Kent State	L 69–89	3–2	19 – Christie	5 – Purvis	5 – Kanerva	MAC Center (1,059); Kent, OH
November 26, 2024*; 7:00 p.m., FloCollege		Youngstown State	W 61–43	4–2	17 – Kanerva	7 – Christie	5 – Kanerva	Cintas Center (518); Cincinnati, OH
December 1, 2024*; 2:00 p.m., ESPN+		at Eastern Michigan	L 60–72	4–3	17 – Tied	5 – Tied	4 – Oborilova	George Gervin GameAbove Center (1,387); Ypsilanti, MI
December 4, 2024; 11:00 a.m., FloCollege		Creighton	L 54–82	4–4 (0–1)	21 – Christie	8 – Christie	5 – Orio	Cintas Center (5,110); Cincinnati, OH
December 7, 2024*; 7:00 p.m., ESPN+		at Bowling Green	L 59–78	4–5	15 – Kanerva	6 – Christie	2 – Tied	Stroh Center (1,778); Bowling Green, OH
December 15, 2024*; 1:00 p.m., FloCollege		Cincinnati; Crosstown Shootout	L 48–60	4–6	13 – Martínez López	7 – Martínez López	5 – Kanerva	Cintas Center (2,519); Cincinnati, OH
December 21, 2024*; 10:35 p.m.		vs. Temple; Raising The B.A.R. Invitational semifinals	L 51–66	4–7	12 – Lopez	5 – Orio	5 – Garcia Roig	Haas Pavilion (1,856); Berkeley, CA
December 22, 2024*; 6:00 p.m.		vs. Fordham; Raising The B.A.R. Invitational 3rd place game	W 71–62	5–7	19 – Purvis	8 – Purvis	4 – Oborilova	Haas Pavilion; Berkeley, CA
December 30, 2024; 7:00 p.m., FloCollege		at Georgetown	L 41–64	5–8 (0–2)	12 – Christie	6 – Purvis	6 – Kanerva	McDonough Gymnasium (629); Washington, D.C.
January 2, 2025; 7:00 p.m., FloCollege		DePaul	L 60–65	5–9 (0–3)	20 – Kanerva	9 – Christie	7 – Kanerva	Cintas Center (1,118); Cincinnati, OH
January 8, 2025; 7:30 p.m., SNY		at No. 7 UConn	L 27–81	5–10 (0–4)	10 – Orio	4 – Tied	3 – Christie	XL Center (13,529); Hartford, CT
January 11, 2025; 2:00 p.m., FloCollege		St. John's	L 39–60	5–11 (0–5)	16 – Christie	5 – Orio	6 – Kanerva	Cintas Center (1,153); Cincinnati, OH
January 15, 2025; 7:00 p.m., FloCollege		at Providence	L 45–51	5–12 (0–6)	14 – Mayo	7 – Mayo	4 – Kanerva	Alumni Hall (703); Providence, RI
January 18, 2025; 2:00 p.m., FloCollege		Butler	W 50–49	6–12 (1–6)	16 – Kanerva	5 – Tied	4 – Tied	Cintas Center (1,293); Cincinnati, OH
January 22, 2025; 8:00 p.m., FloCollege		at DePaul	L 50–57	6–13 (1–7)	16 – Christie	5 – Orio	6 – Kanerva	Wintrust Arena (898); Chicago, IL
January 25, 2025; 2:00 p.m., FloCollege		at Villanova	L 52–67	6–14 (1–8)	10 – Kanerva	6 – Kanerva	3 – Tied	Finneran Pavilion (2,133); Villanova, PA
January 29, 2025; 7:00 p.m., FloCollege		Marquette	L 38–67	6–15 (1–9)	10 – Christie	4 – Tied	3 – Purvis	Cintas Center (1,085); Cincinnati, OH
February 2, 2025; 2:00 p.m., FloCollege		at St. John's	L 44–55	6–16 (1–10)	17 – Kanerva	4 – Tied	4 – López	Carnesecca Arena (685); Queens, NY
February 5, 2025; 7:00 p.m., FloCollege		Georgetown	L 36–63	6–17 (1–11)	8 – Givens	5 – Orio	4 – Kanerva	Cintas Center (1,123); Cincinnati, OH
February 8, 2025; 2:00 p.m., FS1		at Seton Hall	L 46–72	6–18 (1–12)	12 – Tied	4 – Tied	3 – Tied	Walsh Gymnasium (1,284); South Orange, NJ
February 12, 2025; 7:00 p.m., FloCollege		Providence	L 53–61	6–19 (1–13)	17 – Kanerva	3 – Tied	4 – Kanerva	Cintas Center (1,071); Cincinnati, OH
February 16, 2025; 2:00 p.m., FloCollege		Villanova	L 42–57	6–20 (1–14)	15 – Tied	5 – Martínez López	4 – Martínez López	Cintas Center (1,676); Cincinnati, OH
February 19, 2025; 7:00 p.m., FloCollege		at Butler	L 54–58	6–21 (1–15)	17 – Mayo	4 – Purvis	5 – Purvis	Hinkle Fieldhouse (923); Indianapolis, IN
February 27, 2025; 7:30 p.m., FloCollege		at Marquette	L 37–62	6–22 (1–16)	12 – Kanerva	6 – Purvis	5 – Purvis	Al McGuire Center (2,297); Milwaukee, WI
March 2, 2025; 2:00 p.m., FloCollege		Seton Hall	L 57–59	6–23 (1–17)	17 – Kanerva	7 – López	9 – Kanerva	Cintas Center (1,273); Cincinnati, OH
Big East Women's Tournament
March 7, 2025; 4:00 p.m., BEDN	(11)	vs. (6) DePaul; First round	W 80–73	7–23	28 – Kanerva	4 – Purvis	4 – Tied	Mohegan Sun Arena; Uncasville, CT
March 8, 2025; 9:30 p.m., FS2	(11)	vs. (3) Seton Hall; Quarterfinals	L 40–48	7–24	8 – Tied	7 – Tied	4 – Kanerva	Mohegan Sun Arena; Uncasville, CT
*Non-conference game. ^{#}Rankings from AP Poll. (#) Tournament seedings in parentheses. All times are in Eastern Time.
