= 2024–25 St. John's Red Storm women's basketball team =

American college basketball season

2024–25 St. John's Red Storm women's basketball
- Conference: Big East Conference
- Record: 16–15 (5–13 Big East)
- Head coach: Joe Tartamella (13th season)
- Associate head coach: Steve Pogue (1st season)
- Assistant coaches: Shenneika Smith; Kaity Healy
- Home arena: Carnesecca Arena

2024–25 Big East women's basketball standings
	Conf.				Overall
Team	W		L	PCT	W		L	PCT
No. 1 UConn †	18	–	0	1.000	37	–	3	.925
No. 23 Creighton	16	–	2	.889	26	–	7	.788
Seton Hall	13	–	5	.722	23	–	10	.697
Marquette	12	–	6	.667	21	–	11	.656
Villanova	11	–	7	.611	21	–	15	.583
DePaul	8	–	10	.444	13	–	19	.406
Providence	6	–	12	.333	13	–	19	.406
St. John's	5	–	13	.278	16	–	15	.516
Butler	5	–	13	.278	16	–	18	.471
Georgetown	4	–	14	.222	12	–	19	.387
Xavier	1	–	17	.056	7	–	24	.226
† 2025 Big East tournament winner Rankings from AP poll

The 2024–25 St. John's Red Storm women's basketball team represented St. John's University during the 2024–25 NCAA Division I women's basketball season. The Red Storm, led by head coach Joe Tartamella, played their games at Carnesecca Arena and are members of the Big East Conference.

== Previous season ==
The Red Storm finished the season at 18–15 and 11–7 in Big East play to finish in a tie for third place. As a No. 3 seed in the Big East women's tournament, they lost in the quarterfinals against Georgetown. They received a bid to the WBIT tournament, where they defeated Florida in the first game, but lost to Toledo in the next round.

== Offseason ==
=== Departures ===
St. John's departures
Name	Num	Pos.	Height	Year	Hometown	Reason for departure
Unique Drake	1	G	5'7"	Senior	Columbia, SC	Graduated
Tyonna Bailey	1	G	5'10"	Sophomore	Newark, New Jersey	Transferred to Charleston Southern
Jillian Archer	1	F	6'2"	GS	Santa Monica, CA	Graduated

=== Incoming transfers ===
St. John's incoming transfers
Name	Num	Pos.	Height	Year	Hometown	From
Ariana Vanderhoop	1	G	5'9"	Graduate student	Boston, Massachusetts	Monmouth
Lashae Dwyer	13	G	5'6"	Graduate student	Toronto, Ontario	Miami
Kylie Lavelle	14	F	6'2"	Junior	Moosic, Pennsylvania	Penn State
Jade Blagrove	20	F	6'2"	Graduate student	Boston, Massachusetts	South Florida

==== Recruiting class of 2024 ====
College recruiting
Name	Hometown	School	Height	Weight	Commit date
Ariel Little; PG	Brooklyn, NY	South Shore High School	5 ft 4 in (1.63 m)	N/A	
Ariel Little; PG	Recruit ratings: ESPN: (91)				
Janeya Grant; G	Middletown, CT	South Shore Christian Academy	6 ft 0 in (1.83 m)	N/A	
Janeya Grant; G	Recruit ratings: No ratings found				
Overall recruit ranking:
Note: In many cases, Scout, Rivals, 247Sports, On3, and ESPN may conflict in their listings of height and weight.; In these cases, the average was taken. ESPN grades are on a 100-point scale.; Sources: "2024 Player Commits". ESPN. Archived from the original on December 27, 2023.

== Roster ==
2023–24 St. John's Red Storm women's basketball team
Players
Coaches

Pos.	#	Name	Height	Year	Previous school	Hometown
G	1	Ariana Vanderhoop	5 ft 9 in (1.75 m)	GS	Cathedral; Monmouth	Boston, Massachusetts
F	2	Julie Bahati	6 ft 2 in (1.88 m)	So	Springfield Central	Nairobi, Kenya
G	3	Ariel Little	5 ft 4 in (1.63 m)	Fr	South Shore	Brooklyn, New York
G	4	Skye Owen	5 ft 7 in (1.7 m)	So	St. Francis Prep	Staten Island, NY
G	5	Jailah Donald	5 ft 7 in (1.7 m)	So	Serra	Inglewood, CA
G	10	Jayda Brown	6 ft 0 in (1.83 m)	So	Forest Park	Atlanta, GA
G	11	Janeya Grant	6 ft 0 in (1.83 m)	Fr	South Shore	Middletown, CT
G	13	Lashae Dwyer	5 ft 6 in (1.68 m)	Sr	Webb School; Miami	Toronto, Ontario
F	14	Kylie Lavelle	6 ft 2 in (1.88 m)	Jr	Riverside; Penn State; Drexel	Moosic, Pennsylvania
G	20	Jade Blagrove	6 ft 2 in (1.88 m)	GS	Calandlyceum; Manhattan; South Florida	Barendrecht, Netherlands
F	21	Phoenix Gedeon	6 ft 0 in (1.83 m)	Sr	Life Center Academy; Robert Morris	Montreal, QC
F	22	Nevaeh Wingate	6 ft 0 in (1.83 m)	So	Liverpool	Liverpool, NY
G	23	Ber'Nyah Mayo	5 ft 6 in (1.68 m)	GS	St. Elizbeth; UMass	Wilmington, DE
G	44	Tara Daye	5 ft 10 in (1.78 m)	Jr	University; DePaul	Newark, NJ

Head coach

- Joe Tartamella (James Madison)

Assistant coach(es)

- Steve Pogue (Nyack)
- Shenneika Smith (St. John's)
- Kaity Healy (Seton Hall)

Legend

- (C) Team captain
- (S) Suspended
- (I) Ineligible
- (W) Walk-on
- Injured
- Current redshirt

Roster
Last update: December 5, 2024

== Schedule and results ==
Date time, TV	Rank^{#}	Opponent^{#}	Result	Record	High points	High rebounds	High assists	Site (attendance) city, state
Exhibition
October 21, 2024*; 7:00 p.m.		Pace	W 80–48		22 – Dwyer	7 – Daye	2 – Tied	Carnesecca Arena (345); Queens, NY
Non-conference regular season
November 4, 2024*; 2:00 p.m., FloSports		Saint Peter's	W 80–39	1–0	16 – Dwyer	4 – Tied	4 – Dwyer	Carnesecca Arena (446); Queens, NY
November 8, 2024*; 6:00 p.m., NEC Front Row		at LIU	W 67–50	2–0	15 – Lavelle	8 – Daye	3 – Tied	Steinberg Wellness Center (78); Brooklyn, NY
November 13, 2024*; 7:00 p.m., ESPN+		at Loyola (MD)	W 69–61	3–0	22 – Dwyer	5 – Tied	4 – Donald	Reitz Arena (353); Baltimore, MD
November 17, 2024*; 2:00 p.m., ESPN+		at Rhode Island	W 60–45	4–0	15 – Owen	7 – Daye	2 – Tied	Ryan Center (1,115); Kingston, RI
November 21, 2024*; 7:00 p.m., FloSports		Marist	W 69–49	5–0	15 – Dwyer	12 – Dwyer	5 – Tied	Carnesecca Arena (321); Queens, NY
November 24, 2024*; 2:00 p.m., FloSports		Stony Brook	W 58–34	6–0	10 – Tied;	8 – Lavelle	4 – Tied	Carnesecca Arena (562); Queens, NY
November 28, 2024*; 12:00 p.m., FloSports		Harvard	L 52–54	6–1	18 – Dwyer	6 – Tied	3 – Mayo	Carnesecca Arena (269); Queens, NY
December 2, 2024*; 7:00 p.m., BTN		at Penn State	W 72–67	7–1	25 – Dwyer	6 – Dwyer	5 – Tied	Bryce Jordan Center (1,759); State College, PA
December 8, 2024*; 2:00 p.m., FloSports		Wake Forest	W 63–45	8–1	18 – Owen	14 – Gedeon	3 – Mayo	Carnesecca Arena (705); Queens, NY
December 11, 2024*; 6:00 p.m., MSGSN		at Hofstra	W 62–38	9–1	18 – Dwyer	8 – Lavelle	6 – Mayo	Mack Sports Complex (622); Hempstead, NY
December 15, 2024*; 2:00 p.m., FloSports		Fairfield	W 77–68	10–1	18 – Mayo	7 – Gedeon	4 – Dwyer	Carnesecca Arena (589); Queens, NY
Big East regular season
December 21, 2024; 2:00 p.m., FloSports		at Villanova	L 57–71	10–2 (0–1)	12 – Dwyer	8 – Gedeon	4 – Dwyer	Finneran Pavilion (1,113); Villanova, PA
December 28, 2024; 1:30 p.m., FOX		Creighton	L 56–75	10–3 (0–2)	17 – Dwyer	5 – Tied	3 – Mayo	Carnesecca Arena (1,474); Queens, NY
January 1, 2025; 2:00 p.m., FloSports		at Providence	L 52–59 ^{OT}	10–4 (0–3)	15 – Dwyer	10 – Dwyer	3 – Tied	Alumni Hall (817); Providence, RI
January 7, 2025; 8:30 p.m., FS1		DePaul	L 60–67	10–5 (0–4)	15 – Mayo	6 – Gedeon	3 – Tied	Carnesecca Arena (676); Queens, NY
January 11, 2025; 2:00 p.m., FloSports		at Xavier	W 60–39	11–5 (1–4)	23 – Lavelle	5 – Tied	6 – Mayo	Cintas Center (1,153); Cincinnati, OH
January 15, 2025; 7:00 p.m., SNY		No. 6 Uconn	L 45–71	11–6 (1–5)	10 – Mayo	3 – Tied	3 – Little	Carnesecca Arena (4,917); Queens, NY
January 18, 2025; 2:00 p.m., FloSports		Villanova	L 64–66	11–7 (1–6)	13 – Tied	6 – Tied	5 – Mayo	Carnesecca Arena (717); Queens, NY
January 22, 2025; 7:00 p.m., FloSports		at Georgetown	L 54–56	11–8 (1–7)	15 – Lavelle	6 – Dwyer	2 – Tied	McDonough Arena (693); Washington, D.C.
January 25, 2025; 1:00 p.m., FloSports		at Seton Hall	L 48–57	11–9 (1–8)	18 – Mayo	8 – Tied	4 – Dwyer	Walsh Gymnasium (1,284); South Orange, NJ
January 29, 2025; 7:00 p.m., FloSports		Providence	W 62–55	12–9 (2–8)	17 – Owen	7 – Donald	6 – Mayo	Carnesecca Arena (530); Queens, NY
February 2, 2025; 2:00 p.m., FloSports		Xavier	W 55–44	13–9 (3–8)	17 – Mayo	7 – Gedeon	5 – Mayo	Carnesecca Arena (685); Queens, NY
February 5, 2025; 7:30 p.m., FloSports		at Marquette	L 55–57	13–10 (3–9)	13 – Mayo	6 – Mayo	4 – Mayo	Al McGuire Center (1,479); Milwaukee, WI
February 12, 2025; 7:30 p.m., SNY		at No. 7 UConn	L 40–78	13–11 (3–10)	11 – Dwyer	4 – Dwyer	5 – Mayo	Harry A. Gampel Pavilion (10,299); Storrs, CT
February 16, 2025; 5:30 p.m., FloSports		Butler	W 65–43	14–11 (4–10)	21 – Dwyer	9 – Gedeon	5 – Mayo	Madison Square Garden; New York, NY
February 19, 2025; 7:00 p.m., FloSports		at No. 23 Creighton	L 62–65	14–12 (4–11)	18 – Dwyer	7 – Donald	4 – Tied	D. J. Sokol Arena (1,035); Omaha, NE
February 23, 2025; 4:30 p.m., FloSports		Seton Hall	L 57–66	14–13 (4–12)	17 – Dwyer	7 – Mayo	2 – Dwyer	Carnesecca Arena (527); Queens, NY
February 26, 2025; 7:00 p.m., FloSports		Georgetown	W 83–49	15–13 (5–12)	25 – Dwyer	6 – Gedeon	5 – Mayo	Carnesecca Arena (733); Queens, NY
March 2, 2024; 3:00 p.m., FloSports		at DePaul	L 64–65 ^{OT}	15–14 (5–13)	27 – Mayo	10 – Bahati	2 – Tied	Wintrust Arena (2,985); Chicago, IL
Big East Women's Tournament
March 7, 2025; 11:00 a.m., BEDN	(8)	vs. (9) Butler; First Round	W 66–50	16–14	16 – Mayo	7 – Gedeon	3 – Tied	Mohegan Sun Arena; Uncasville, CT
March 8, 2025; 12:00 p.m., FS1	(8)	vs. (1) No. 3 UConn; Quarterfinals	L 40–71	16–15	11 – Tied	6 – Mayo	2 – Tied	Mohegan Sun Arena (8,816); Uncasville, CT
*Non-conference game. ^{#}Rankings from AP Poll. (#) Tournament seedings in parentheses. All times are in Eastern Time.

== Rankings ==
Ranking movements
	Week																				
Poll	Pre	1	2	3	4	5	6	7	8	9	10	11	12	13	14	15	16	17	18	19	Final
AP																					Not released
Coaches																					

== See also ==
- 2024–25 St. John's Red Storm men's basketball team
