= Jill Pizzotti =

American basketball player-coach

Jill M. Pizzotti
Current position
- Title: Head Coach
- Team: DePaul
- Conference: Big East
- Record: 21–43 (.328)

Biographical details
- Born: June 18, 1966 (age 60); Lombard, Illinois, U.S.
- Education: Southeast Missouri State

Playing career
- 1984–1988: Southeast Missouri State

Coaching career (HC unless noted)
- 1989–1991: Southeast Missouri State (asst.)
- 1991–1992: Northern Kentucky (asst.)
- 1992–1995: Indiana (asst.)
- 1995–2005: Saint Louis
- 2005–2010*: Manager of Women's College Basketball - Nike
- 2010–2011: West Virginia (asst.)
- 2011–2014: DePaul (asst.)
- 2014–2024: DePaul (AHC)
- 2024–2025: DePaul (interim HC)
- 2025–present: DePaul

Head coaching record
- Overall: 134–210 (.390)

Accomplishments and honors

Awards
- MIAA tournament champion (1987); Southeast Missouri Athletics Hall of Fame (2020)

Jill M. Pizzotti (born June 18, 1966) is an American college basketball coach who is currently the head women's basketball coach at DePaul University. She was previously the head coach at Saint Louis University from 1995 to 2005 and served as assistant then associate head coach under Doug Bruno at DePaul from 2011 to 2024.

== Early life ==
A native of Lombard, Illinois, Pizzotti graduated from Willowbrook High School in Villa Park in 1984. She was inducted into her school's inaugural Athletic Hall of Fame in 2010.

== Coaching history ==
=== Early career ===
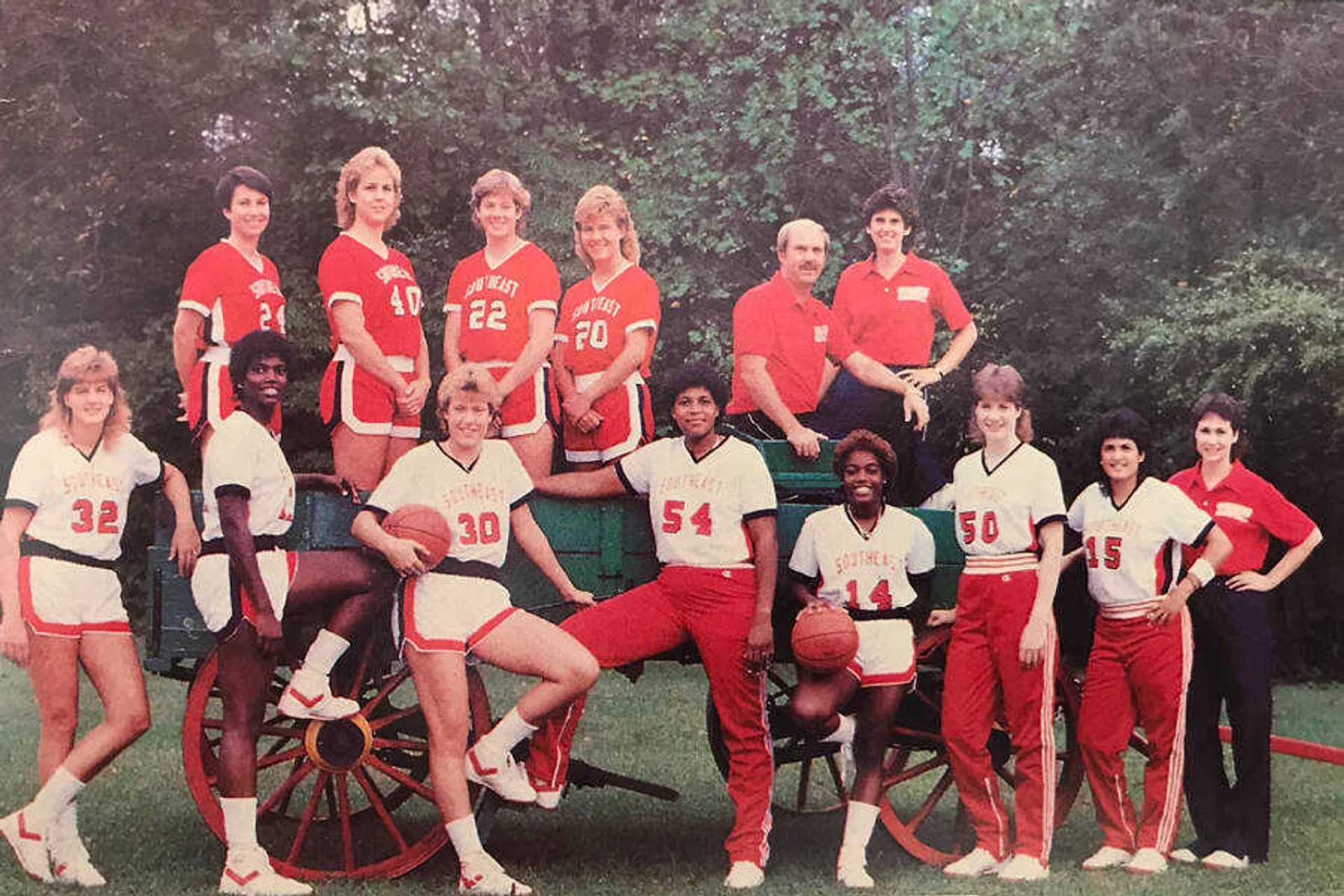
SEMO 1986-87 women’s basketball team, Pizzotti #15 standing right

Pizzotti played collegiately at Southeast Missouri State University from 1984 to 1988, prior to the university's move up from Division II in 1991. The 1986–1987 team would go on to win their conference championship, the first ever post season championship in program history and breaking Central Missouri State's four-championship-streak. Pizzotti played in the final game at the Houck Field House on February 18, 1987 prior to future games being played at the Show Me Center. The entire 1986–1987 team were part of the 2020 induction class into the Southeast Missouri Athletics Hall of Fame.

After graduating, she joined the university as a graduate assistant coach in the women's basketball program under local SEMO legend, head coach Ed Arnzen. In 1991 the team repeated their previous success with another conference championship. Once again breaking another three-championship-streak by CMSU. The Otahkians became the runner-up in the 1991 Division II tournament, losing to North Dakota State in the final 74―81. After two seasons, Pizzotti was named assistant coach at Northern Kentucky University for one year. By 1992 she was again named assistant coach at Indiana University Bloomington until 1995. Where she would witness two NCAA tournament appearances.

=== Saint Louis University ===
Pizzotti became head coach for the first time at Saint Louis University from 1995 to 2005. Her tenure was largely uneventful and the team reached the post season only once. The 2003 WNIT saw the Billikens reach only the first round before losing to Iowa 64―93. She would leave the university after 10 years, finishing with a (113–167) record.

=== DePaul University ===
After a one-year stint at West Virginia University, Pizzotti was picked up as the assistant coach of the DePaul Blue Demons starting in 2011. She was elevated to the position of associate head coach in 2014. Just prior to the start of the 2024–25 season, it was announced that then head coach Doug Bruno was to miss the opener due to a "medical complication." Pizzotti was made interim head coach in his absence. She would go on to coach the entire season, finishing with a 13–19 record and 6th in the conference. The best since the 2021–22 season. In March 2025, it was announced that Bruno would step down after 39 seasons as head coach. On April 3, the university announced that they had chosen Pizzotti as the next head coach of the women's basketball program. On April 29, it was announced that former WNBA player Kathleen Doyle would serve as the assistant coach and recruiting coordinator. After a one year stint at Loyola Chicago, it was announced on April 21, 2026 that assistant coach Jasmyne Fogle would serve in the same position under Pizzotti.

== Head coaching record ==
Record table
Season	Team	Overall	Conference	Standing	Postseason
Saint Louis (CUSA) (1995–2005)
1995–96	Saint Louis	6–21	1–13	11th	
1996–97	Saint Louis	10–18	4–10	10th	
1997–98	Saint Louis	13–14	5–11	7th	
1998–99	Saint Louis	16–12	6–10	9th	
1999–2000	Saint Louis	11–17	4–12	9th	
2000–01	Saint Louis	14–14	5–11	9th	
2001–02	Saint Louis	14–15	6–8	9th	
2002–03	Saint Louis	17–14	8–6	5th	WNIT First Round
2003–04	Saint Louis	8–19	2–12	12th	
2004–05	Saint Louis	4–23	3–11	12th	
Saint Louis:		113–167 (.404)	44–104 (.297)		
DePaul (Big East) (2024–present)
2024–25	DePaul (interim HC)	13–19	8–10	6th	
2025–26	DePaul	8–24	5–15	10th	
DePaul:		21–43 (.328)	13–25 (.342)		
Total:		134–210 (.390)			
National champion Postseason invitational champion Conference regular season champion Conference regular season and conference tournament champion Division regular season champion Division regular season and conference tournament champion Conference tournament champion
