= 2024–25 Big Ten Conference women's basketball season =

- League: NCAA Division I
- Sport: Basketball
- Teams: 18
- TV partner(s): Big Ten Network, Fox, FS1, Peacock

2024–25 NCAA Division I women's basketball season
- Season champions: USC

Tournament
- Champions: UCLA
- Runners-up: USC
- Finals MVP: Lauren Betts

Basketball seasons
- 2023–24 2025–26

2024–25 Big Ten women's basketball standings
	Conf.				Overall
Team	W		L	PCT	W		L	PCT
No. 5 USC	17	–	1	.944	31	–	4	.886
No. 3 UCLA †	16	–	2	.889	34	–	3	.919
No. 19 Ohio State	13	–	5	.722	26	–	7	.788
No. 12 Maryland	13	–	5	.722	25	–	8	.758
No. 25 Michigan	11	–	7	.611	23	–	11	.676
Michigan State	11	–	7	.611	22	–	10	.688
Illinois	11	–	7	.611	22	–	10	.688
Oregon	10	–	8	.556	20	–	12	.625
Indiana	10	–	8	.556	20	–	13	.606
Nebraska	10	–	8	.556	21	–	12	.636
Iowa	10	–	8	.556	23	–	11	.676
Washington	9	–	9	.500	19	–	14	.576
Minnesota	8	–	10	.444	25	–	11	.694
Wisconsin	4	–	14	.222	13	–	17	.433
Rutgers	3	–	15	.167	13	–	20	.394
Purdue	3	–	15	.167	10	–	19	.345
Northwestern	2	–	16	.111	9	–	18	.333
Penn State	1	–	17	.056	10	–	19	.345
† 2025 Big Ten tournament winner As of April 7, 2025; Rankings from AP poll

The 2024–25 Big Ten women's basketball season began with practices in October 2024, followed by the start of the 2024–25 NCAA Division I women's basketball season in November 2024. The regular season ended in March 2025.

The season was the conference's first with 18 teams as four schools—Oregon, UCLA, USC, and Washington—joined the conference in August 2024. The conference announced that all teams would play 18 regular season conference games with each school playing one school both home and away, while facing 16 teams once. However, only 15 of the 18 teams would qualify for the Big Ten tournament.

The USC Trojans won the regular season, with the final game against rival UCLA deciding first place. The UCLA Bruins won the 2025 Big Ten women's basketball tournament, defeating USC in the championship game.

An NCAA record twelve Big Ten teams were invited to the 2025 NCAA women's basketball tournament. UCLA, USC, Ohio State, Maryland, Michigan, Iowa, Michigan State, Illinois, Indiana, Nebraska, Oregon, and Washington all received bids to the 2025 tournament. Tournament Winner UCLA was the overall No. 1 seed, and USC was the No. 4 overall seed. Minnesota was the sole Big Ten team invited to the 2025 Women's Basketball Invitation Tournament (WBIT). The Gophers won the 2025 WBIT.

== Head coaches ==
=== Coaching changes ===
On May 13, 2024, Lisa Bluder retired as head coach at Iowa after 24 years. Longtime Iowa associate head coach Jan Jensen was named Bluder's successor later that day.

=== Coaches ===
Team	Head coach	Previous job	Years at school	Overall record	Big Ten record	Big Ten titles	Big Ten Tournament titles	NCAA Tournaments	NCAA Final Fours	NCAA Championships
Illinois	Shauna Green	Dayton	3	41–25	19–17	0	0	1	0	0
Indiana	Teri Moren	Indiana State	11	226–99	114–60	1	0	6	0	0
Iowa	Jan Jensen	Iowa (Assoc.)	1	0–0	0–0	0	0	0	0	0
Maryland	Brenda Frese	Minnesota	23	582–161	146–29*	6	5	20	3	1
Michigan	Kim Barnes Arico	St. John's (Asst.)	13	261–133	118–84	0	0	7	0	0
Michigan State	Robyn Fralick	Bowling Green	2	22–9	12–6	0	0	1	0	0
Minnesota	Dawn Plitzuweit	West Virginia	2	20–16	5–13	0	0	0	0	0
Nebraska	Amy Williams	South Dakota	9	137–111	69–72	0	0	3	0	0
Northwestern	Joe McKeown	George Washington	17	261–246	108–166	0	0	2	0	0
Ohio State	Kevin McGuff	Washington	12	198–102	103–57	4	1	7	0	0
Oregon	Kelly Graves	Gonzaga	11	223–100	0–0	0	0	5	0	0
Penn State	Carolyn Kieger	Marquette	4	63–86	25–66	0	0	0	0	0
Purdue	Katie Gearlds	Marian	4	51–45	21–32	0	0	1	0	0
Rutgers	Coquese Washington	Notre Dame (Assoc.)	3	20–44	7–29	0	0	0	0	0
UCLA	Cori Close	Florida State (Assoc.)	14	287–140	0–0	0	0	8	0	0
USC	Lindsay Gottlieb	Cleveland Cavaliers (Asst.)	4	62–32	0–0	0	0	2	0	0
Washington	Tina Langley	Rice	4	42–46	0–0	0	0	0	0	0
Wisconsin	Marisa Moseley	Boston University	4	34–56	17–36	0	0	0	0	0

==== Notes ====
- All records, appearances, titles, etc. are from time with current school only.
- Year at school includes 2024–25season.
- Overall and Big Ten records are from time at current school and are through the beginning of the season.
- Frese's ACC conference record excluded since Maryland began Big Ten Conference play in 2014–15.

== Preseason ==
=== Preseason Big Ten poll ===
Prior to the conference's annual media day, conference standings were projected by a panel of writers.

Rank	Team
1	USC
2	UCLA
3	Ohio State
4	Maryland
5	Indiana

=== Preseason All-Big Ten ===
A select media panel named a preseason All-Big Ten team and player of the year.

Honor	Recipient
Preseason Player of the Year	JuJu Watkins, USC
Preseason All-Big Ten Team	Makira Cook, Illinois
Preseason All-Big Ten Team	Hannah Stuelke, Iowa
Preseason All-Big Ten Team	Lucy Olsen, Iowa
Preseason All-Big Ten Team	Shyanne Sellers, Maryland
Preseason All-Big Ten Team	Alexis Markowski, Nebraska
Preseason All-Big Ten Team	Cotie McMahon, Ohio State
Preseason All-Big Ten Team	Lauren Betts, UCLA
Preseason All-Big Ten Team	Kiki Rice, UCLA
Preseason All-Big Ten Team	JuJu Watkins, USC
Preseason All-Big Ten Team	Kiki Iriafen, USC
Preseason All-Big Ten Team	Serah Williams, Wisconsin

- Additional player due to tie in voting

== Awards and honors ==
=== Players of the Week ===
Throughout the conference regular season, Big Ten Conference offices named two players (Player and Freshman) of the week each Monday.

Week	Player of the week	Freshman of the week
November 11, 2024	Destiny Adams, Rutgers	Syla Swords, Michigan
November 18, 2024	Lauren Betts, UCLA	Mila Holloway, Michigan
November 25, 2024	Kendall Bostic, Illinois	Lana McCarthy, Purdue
December 2, 2024	Ajae Petty, Ohio State	Syla Swords, Michigan
December 9, 2024	JuJu Watkins, USC	Olivia Olson, Michigan
December 16, 2024	Serah Williams, Wisconsin	Kiyomi McMiller, Rutgers
December 23, 2024	JuJu Watkins, USC	Kiyomi McMiller, Rutgers
January 6, 2025	Kaylene Smikle, Maryland; JuJu Watkins, USC	Tori McKinney, Minnesota
January 13, 2025	JuJu Watkins, USC	Jaloni Cambridge, Ohio State
January 20, 2025	Shyanne Sellers, Maryland	Jaloni Cambridge, Ohio State; Britt Prince, Nebraska
January 27, 2025	Lauren Betts, UCLA	Avery Howell, USC
February 3, 2025	Lucy Olsen, Iowa; Genesis Bryant, Illinois	Olivia Olson, Michigan
February 10, 2025	Kaylene Smikle, Maryland	Syla Swords, Michigan
February 17, 2025	JuJu Watkins, USC	Ava Watson, Ohio State
February 24, 2025	JuJu Watkins, USC; Lauren Betts, UCLA	Jaloni Cambridge, Ohio State
March 3, 2025	JuJu Watkins, USC	Jaloni Cambridge, Ohio State

=== All-Big Ten awards and teams ===
On March 4, 2025, the Big Ten announced its conference awards.

Honor	Coaches	Media
Player of the Year	JuJu Watkins, USC	JuJu Watkins, USC
Coach of the Year	Lindsay Gottlieb, USC	Lindsay Gottlieb, USC
Freshman of the Year	Olivia Olson, Michigan	Jaloni Cambridge, Ohio State
Defensive Player of the Year	Lauren Betts, UCLA	Lauren Betts, UCLA
Sixth Player of the Year	Janiah Barker, UCLA	Janiah Barker, UCLA
All-Big Ten First Team*	Lauren Betts, UCLA	Lauren Betts, UCLA
All-Big Ten First Team*	Kendall Bostic, Illinois	Kendall Bostic, Illinois
All-Big Ten First Team*	Jaloni Cambridge, Ohio State	Kiki Iriafen, USC
All-Big Ten First Team*	Kiki Iriafen, USC	Alexis Markowski, Nebraska
All-Big Ten First Team*	Cotie McMahon, Ohio State	Cotie McMahon, Ohio State
All-Big Ten First Team*	Lucy Olsen, Iowa	Lucy Olsen, Iowa
All-Big Ten First Team*	Kiki Rice, UCLA	Kiki Rice, UCLA
All-Big Ten First Team*	Shyanne Sellers, Maryland	Shyanne Sellers, Maryland
All-Big Ten First Team*	JuJu Watkins, USC	Kaylene Smikle, Maryland
All-Big Ten First Team*	Serah Williams, Wisconsin	JuJu Watkins, USC
All-Big Ten First Team*	Not Selected (Note: The media's All-Big Ten First Team had 11 members due to a tie in voting.)	Serah Williams, Wisconsin
All-Big Ten Second Team	Destiny Adams, Rutgers	Destiny Adams, Rutgers
All-Big Ten Second Team	Julia Ayrault, Michigan State	Julia Ayrault, Michigan State
All-Big Ten Second Team	Genesis Bryant, Illinois	Genesis Bryant, Illinois
All-Big Ten Second Team	Yarden Garzon, Indiana	Jaloni Cambridge, Ohio State
All-Big Ten Second Team	Elle Ladine, Washington	Yarden Garzon, Indiana
All-Big Ten Second Team	Alexis Markowski, Nebraska	Elle Ladine, Washington
All-Big Ten Second Team	Olivia Olson, Michigan	Olivia Olson, Michigan
All-Big Ten Second Team	Kaylene Smikle, Maryland	Hannah Stuelke, Iowa
All-Big Ten Second Team	Syla Swords, Michigan	Syla Swords, Michigan
All-Big Ten Second Team	Grace VanSlooten, Michigan State	Grace VanSlooten, Michigan State
All-Freshman Team	Jaloni Cambridge, Ohio State	Jaloni Cambridge, Ohio State
All-Freshman Team	Olivia Olson, Michigan	Olivia Olson, Michigan
All-Freshman Team	Britt Prince, Nebraska	Britt Prince, Nebraska
All-Freshman Team	Kennedy Smith, USC	Kennedy Smith, USC
All-Freshman Team	Syla Swords, Michigan	Syla Swords, Michigan
All-Defensive Team	Lauren Betts, UCLA	Lauren Betts, UCLA
All-Defensive Team	Rayah Marshall, USC	Rayah Marshall, USC
All-Defensive Team	Taylor Thierry, Ohio State	Taylor Thierry, Ohio State
All-Defensive Team	JuJu Watkins, USC	JuJu Watkins, USC
All-Defensive Team	Serah Williams, Wisconsin	Serah Williams, Wisconsin

== Postseason ==
=== Big Ten tournament ===
First round Wednesday, March 5 Peacock
12	Washington	79
13	Minnesota	65
10	Nebraska	84
15	Rutgers	60
11	Iowa	81
14	Wisconsin	54

Second round Thursday, March 6 BTN
8	Oregon	62
9	Indiana	78
5	Michigan	66
12	Washington	58
7	Illinois	70
10	Nebraska	74
6	Michigan State	61
11	Iowa	74

Quarterfinals; Friday, March 7 BTN
1	USC	84
9	Indiana	79
4	Maryland	71
5	Michigan	98
2	UCLA	85
10	Nebraska	74
3	Ohio State	60
11	Iowa	59

Semifinals; Saturday, March 8 BTN
1	USC	82
5	Michigan	70
2	UCLA	75
3	Ohio State	46

Championship; Sunday, March 9 CBS
1	USC	67
2	UCLA	72

* denotes overtime period

=== NCAA tournament ===
Seed	Region	School	First Four	First round	Second round	Sweet Sixteen	Elite Eight	Final Four	Championship
1	S4	USC		W 71–25 vs. (16) Greensboro	W 96–59 vs. (9) Mississippi State	W 67–61 vs. (5) Kansas State	L 64–78 vs. (2) UConn	DNP	
1	S1	UCLA		W 84–46 vs. (16) Southern	W 84–67 vs. (8) Richmond	W 76–62 vs. (5) Ole Miss	W 72–65 vs. (3) LSU	L 51–85 vs. (2) UConn	DNP
4	B3	Ohio State		W 71–51 vs. (13) Montana State	L 67–82 vs. (5) Tennessee	DNP			
4	B2	Maryland		W 82–69 vs. (13) Norfolk State	W 111–108 vs. (5) Alabama	L 67–71 vs. (1) South Carolina	DNP		
6	B3	Michigan		W 80–74 vs. (11) Iowa State	L 55–76 vs. (3) Notre Dame	DNP			
6	S4	Iowa		W 92–57 vs. (11) Murray State	L 62–96 vs. (3) Oklahoma	DNP			
7	S1	Michigan State		W 64–50 vs. (10) Harvard	L 49–83 vs. (2) NC State	DNP			
8	B3	Illinois		W 66–57 vs. (9) Creighton	L 48–65 vs. (1) Texas	DNP			
9	B2	Indiana		W 76–68 vs. (8) Utah	L 53–64 vs. (1) South Carolina	DNP			
10	B2	Oregon		W 77–73 vs. (7) Vanderbilt	L 53–59 vs. (2) Duke	DNP			
10	B3	Nebraska		L 58–63 vs. (7) Louisville	DNP				
11	B2	Washington	L 60–63 vs. (6) Columbia	DNP					
		W–L (%):	0–1 (.000)	10–1 (.909)	3–7 (.300)	2–1 (.667)	1–1 (.500)	0–1 (.000)	– (–)
Total: 16–12 (.571)

=== WBIT tournament ===
Seed	Region	School	1st Round	2nd Round	Quarterfinals	Semifinals	Championship
2	Colorado	Minnesota	W 65–53 vs. Toledo (Toledo)	W 78–71 vs. Missouri State (Springfield)	W 82–77^{(OT)} vs. Gonzaga (Minneapolis)	W 66–52 vs. Florida (Indianapolis)	W 75–63 vs. Belmont (Indianapolis)
		W–L (%):	5–0 (1.000)				
Total: 5–0 (1.000)

=== WNIT tournament ===
Seed	Region	School	1st Round	2nd Round	3rd Round	Quarterfinals	Semifinals	Championship
		Rutgers		W 71–60 vs. Army (Piscataway)	W 89–67 vs. Charleston (Piscataway)	L 64–71 at Buffalo (Buffalo)	DNP	
		W–L (%):	1–2 (.333)					
Total: 1–2 (.333)
