= Harmoni Turner =

American basketball player (born 2001)

Savannah Steel
- Position: Guard
- League: UpShot League

Personal information
- Born: October 4, 2001 (age 24) Mansfield, Texas, U.S.
- Listed height: 5 ft 10 in (1.78 m)

Career information
- High school: Mansfield Legacy (Mansfield, Texas)
- College: Harvard (2021–2025)
- WNBA draft: 2025: 3rd round, 35th overall pick
- Drafted by: Las Vegas Aces

Career history
- 2025: Landerneau Bretagne
- 2026–present: Savannah Steel

Career highlights
- AP All-American Honorable Mention (2025); Ivy Player of the Year (2025); 3x First-team All-Ivy (2023–2025); Second-team All-Ivy (2022); Ivy Tournament MVP (2025); Ivy Rookie of the Year (2022)
- Stats at Basketball Reference
Medals
Women's 3x3 basketball
Representing the United States
FIBA 3x3 Under-23 World Cup
Gold medal – first place	2024 Ulaanbaatar	Team

Harmoni Turner (born October 4, 2001) is an American professional basketball player who plays for the Savannah Steel of the UpShot League. She played college basketball at Harvard. She was selected 35th overall by the Las Vegas Aces in the 2025 WNBA draft.

== Early life and high school career ==
Turner was raised in Mansfield, Texas. She attended Mansfield Legacy High School, where she captained the basketball team and broke 14 school records. She announced her commitment to Harvard in 2019.

== College career ==
Turner played for the Harvard Crimson for four years, having a breakout rookie season where she was named Ivy League Rookie of the Year. In her senior season, Turner was named Ivy League Player of the Year and captained Harvard to its first Ivy League championship. At Harvard, Turner majored in African and African American studies and sociology.

In 2025, Turner earned the Becky Hammon Mid-Major Player of the Year Award.

== Professional career ==
On April 14, 2025, Turner was selected 35th overall in the third round of the 2025 WNBA draft by the Las Vegas Aces. She is the second player in Harvard's history to be drafted without first playing for another school. On May 7, she was waived by the Aces.

In April 2025, Turner was invited to Kelsey Plum's Dawg Class, an Under Armour-sponsored camp to help top college athletes transition from collegiate to professional basketball.

In August 2025, Turner moved to the French League to play for Landerneau.

Towards the end of the 2025 regular season, Turner was featured — along with Diamond DeShields, Julie Vanloo, Haley Jones, and Shyanne Sellers — in an ESPN article on life on the WNBA fringe given the league's limit of only 12 roster spots per team.

On April 15, 2026, Turner signed a training camp contract with the Connecticut Sun. On May 11, it was announced Turner had joined the Savannah Steel for the team's inaugural season.

== National U23 3x3 career ==
Turner was named to the United States women's national U23 3x3 team for the 2024 FIBA 3x3 U23 World Cup. Turner and Team USA won the team's first gold medal in tournament history.

== Career statistics ==
Legend
GP	Games played	GS	Games started	MPG	Minutes per game	RPG	Rebounds per game
APG	Assists per game	SPG	Steals per game	BPG	Blocks per game	PPG	Points per game
TO	Turnovers per game	FG%	Field-goal percentage	3P%	3-point field-goal percentage	FT%	Free-throw percentage
**Bold**	Career best	°	League leader

=== College ===
Year	Team	GP	GS	MPG	FG%	3P%	FT%	RPG	APG	SPG	BPG	TO	PPG
2021–22	Harvard	27	26	30.3	37.6	34.5	80.3	**6.5**	2.5	2.4	.1	3.0	15.9
2022–23	Harvard	**31**	**30**	**33.8**	39.5	32.5	**82.1**	6.2	**4.5**	2.3	**.3**	3.5	16.3
2023–24	Harvard	23	23	33.5	41.1	26.4	77.4	6.2	4.3	2.2	.1	2.8	19.3
2024–25	Harvard	29	29	32.7	**43.5**	**35.6**	81.2	5.4	3.4	**2.8**	**.3**	**2.2**	**22.5**
**Career**		110	108	32.6	40.6	33.0	80.2	6.1	3.7	2.4	.2	2.9	18.5
