= 2025 Ivy League women's basketball tournament =

American college basketball tournament

- Classification: Division I
- Season: 2024–25
- Teams: 4
- Site: Pizzitola Sports Center; Providence, Rhode Island
- Champions: Harvard (1st title)
- Winning coach: Carrie Moore (1st title)
- MVP: Harmoni Turner
- Television: ESPNU, ESPN+,

2024–25 Ivy League women's basketball standings
	Conf.				Overall
Team	W		L	PCT	W		L	PCT
Columbia	13	–	1	.929	24	–	7	.774
Princeton	12	–	2	.857	21	–	8	.724
Harvard †	11	–	3	.786	24	–	5	.828
Penn	6	–	8	.429	15	–	13	.536
Brown	6	–	8	.429	12	–	15	.444
Cornell	3	–	11	.214	7	–	20	.259
Yale	3	–	11	.214	4	–	23	.148
Dartmouth	2	–	12	.143	8	–	19	.296
† 2025 Ivy League tournament winner

The 2025 Ivy League Women's Basketball Tournament, popularly referred to as "Ivy Madness", was the postseason women's basketball tournament for the Ivy League of the 2024–25 NCAA Division I women's basketball season. It was held on March 14 and 15, 2025, at the Pizzitola Sports Center on the campus of Brown University in Providence, Rhode Island. The winner, Harvard, received the Ivy League's automatic bid to the 2025 NCAA Tournament.

== Seeds ==
The top four teams in the Ivy League regular-season standings qualified for the tournament and were seeded according to their records in conference play, resulting in a Shaughnessy playoff. If a tie for any of the top four positions exists, tiebreakers are applied in the following order:

- Head-to-head record between teams involved in the tie.
- Record against the top team(s) not involved in the tie in order of conference record, going down through the seedings until the tie is broken.
- Average of the teams' ranking in the following computer systems: NCAA NET, Sagarin, KenPom, and ESPN Basketball Percentage Index.

Seed	School	Record	Tiebreaker
1	Columbia	13–1	
2	Princeton	12–2	
3	Harvard	11–3	
4	Penn	6–8	NET: 162
DNQ	Brown	6–8	NET: 184
DNQ	Cornell	3–11	NET: 249
DNQ	Yale	3–11	NET: 326
DNQ	Dartmouth	2–12	

== Schedule ==
Session	Game	Time	Matchup	Score	Television	Attendance
Semifinals – Friday, March 14
1	1	4:30 pm	No. 1 Columbia vs. No. 4 Penn	60–54	ESPN+	1,114
1	2	7:30 pm	No. 2 Princeton vs. No. 3 Harvard	67–70	ESPN+	458
Championship – Saturday, March 15
2	3	5:30 pm	No. 1 Columbia vs. No. 3 Harvard	71–74	ESPNU	1,326
Game times in EDT. Rankings denote tournament seeding.

== Bracket ==
Semifinals; Friday, March 14; ESPNU; ESPN+
1	Columbia	60
4	Penn	54
2	Princeton	67
3	Harvard	70

Championship; Saturday, March 15; ESPNU
1	Columbia	71
3	Harvard	74

== See also ==
- 2025 Ivy League men's basketball tournament
