= 2024–25 Princeton Tigers women's basketball team =

Intercollegiate basketball season

2024–25 Princeton Tigers women's basketball

NCAA tournament, First Four
- Conference: Ivy League
- Record: 21–8 (12–2 Ivy)
- Head coach: Carla Berube (6th season)
- Assistant coaches: Lauren Battista (6th season); Lauren Dillon (6th season); Jordan Edwards (1st season)
- Home arena: Jadwin Gymnasium

2024–25 Ivy League women's basketball standings
	Conf.				Overall
Team	W		L	PCT	W		L	PCT
Columbia	13	–	1	.929	24	–	7	.774
Princeton	12	–	2	.857	21	–	8	.724
Harvard †	11	–	3	.786	24	–	5	.828
Penn	6	–	8	.429	15	–	13	.536
Brown	6	–	8	.429	12	–	15	.444
Cornell	3	–	11	.214	7	–	20	.259
Yale	3	–	11	.214	4	–	23	.148
Dartmouth	2	–	12	.143	8	–	19	.296
† 2025 Ivy League tournament winner

The 2024–25 Princeton Tigers women's basketball team represented Princeton University during the 2024–25 NCAA Division I women's basketball season. The Tigers, led by fifth-year head coach Carla Berube, played their home games at Jadwin Gymnasium in Princeton, New Jersey as members of the Ivy League.

== Previous season ==
The Tigers finished the 2023–24 season with a 25–5 overall record, 13–1 in Ivy League play, to finish in first place with Columbia, and were the conference's regular-season co-champion. As the top seed in the Ivy League tournament, they beat Penn and Columbia to win the championship. They received an automatic bid to the NCAA tournament, where they were the ninth seed in the Albany Regional 2. They lost in the first round to West Virginia.

== Offseason ==
=== Departures ===
Princeton departures
Name	Num	Pos.	Height	Year	Hometown	Reason for departure
Ellie Mitchell	00	F	6'1"	Senior	Chevy Chase, MD	Graduated
Kaitlyn Chen	20	G	5'9"	Senior	San Marino, CA	Graduated, transferred to UConn
Margo Mattes	21	G	5'10"	Freshman	Brookline, MA	Retired from basketball
Chet Nweke	25	G	6'10"	Senior	Woodbine, MD	Transferred to Georgetown

=== Transfers ===
There were no transfers for the 2024–25 season.

=== Recruiting ===
There was no recruiting class for 2024.

== Roster ==
2024–25 Princeton Tigers women's basketball team
Players
Coaches

Pos.	#	Name	Height	Year	Previous school	Hometown
G	1	Adaora Nwokeji	5 ft 8 in (1.73 m)	Sr	Summer Creek High School	Houston, Texas
G/F	2	Olivia Hutcherson	5 ft 11 in (1.8 m)	So	Holy Innocents' Episcopal School	Johns Creek, Georgia
F	3	Tabitha Amanze	6 ft 4 in (1.93 m)	Jr	Blair Academy	Ogun, Nigeria
F	5	Paige Morton	6 ft 3 in (1.91 m)	Sr	Oak Knoll School	Summit, New Jersey
G	10	Skye Belker	5 ft 9 in (1.75 m)	So	Windward School	Los Angeles, California
F	11	Taylor Charles	6 ft 2 in (1.88 m)	Jr	Burlington Central High School	Elgin, Illinois
G	12	Cristina Parrella	5 ft 10 in (1.78 m)	Fr	Saddle River Day School	Closter, New Jersey
G	13	Ashley Chea	5 ft 8 in (1.73 m)	So	Flintridge Prep	Los Angeles, California
F	14	Emily Eadie	6 ft 0 in (1.83 m)	Fr	Sage Hill School	Newport Beach, California
G/F	15	Fadima Tall	6 ft 0 in (1.83 m)	So	Georgetown Visitation Prep	Silver Spring, Maryland
G	21	Toby Nweke	5 ft 9 in (1.75 m)	Fr	Georgetown Visitation Prep	Woodbine, Maryland
F	22	Parker Hill	6 ft 4 in (1.93 m)	Sr	Winston Churchill High School	Bethesda, Maryland
G	23	Madison St. Rose	5 ft 10 in (1.78 m)	Jr	St. John Vianney High School	Old Bridge, New Jersey
G	32	Amelia Osgood	5 ft 9 in (1.75 m)	Sr	Brentwood High School	Brentwood, Tennessee
F	44	Katie Thiers	6 ft 2 in (1.88 m)	Sr	Roosevelt High School	Seattle, Washington

Head coach

- Carla Berube (Connecticut)

Assistant coach(es)

- Lauren Battista (Bentley)
- Lauren Dillon (Tufts)
- Jordan Edwards (High Point)

Legend

- (C) Team captain
- (S) Suspended
- (I) Ineligible
- (W) Walk-on
- Injured
- Current redshirt

Roster
Last update: February 15, 2025

== Schedule and results ==
Date time, TV	Rank^{#}	Opponent^{#}	Result	Record	Site (attendance) city, state
Non-conference regular season
November 4, 2024*; 5:00 p.m., ESPN+		at Duquesne	L 66–76	0–1	UPMC Cooper Fieldhouse (932); Pittsburgh, PA
November 9, 2024*; 2:00 p.m., FloHoops		at DePaul	W 79–58	1–1	Wintrust Arena (1,233); Chicago, IL
November 13, 2024*; 7:00 p.m., ESPN+		Villanova	W 70–61	2–1	Jadwin Gymnasium (925); Princeton, NJ
November 16, 2024*; 2:00 p.m., ESPN+		at Quinnipiac	L 66–74	2–2	M&T Bank Arena (685); Hamden, CT
November 21, 2024*; 7:00 p.m., FloHoops		at Seton Hall	W 78–75	3–2	Walsh Gymnasium (816); South Orange, NJ
November 24, 2024*; 2:00 p.m., B1G+		at Rutgers; Rivalry	W 66–49	4–2	Jersey Mike's Arena (2,281); Piscataway, NJ
November 26, 2024*; 5:00 p.m., ESPN+		at Temple	W 62–57	5–2	Liacouras Center (1,063); Philadelphia, PA
December 6, 2024*; 9:00 p.m., ESPN+		at Portland	L 55–74	5–3	Chiles Center (665); Portland, OR
December 8, 2024*; 4:00 p.m., ESPN+		at Utah	L 76–79	5–4	Jon M. Huntsman Center (4,062); Salt Lake City, UT
December 11, 2024*; 7:00 p.m., SNY/NBCSP		Rhode Island	W 66–54	6–4	Jadwin Gymnasium (742); Princeton, NJ
December 21, 2024*; 12:00 p.m., ESPN+		Vermont	W 60–45	7–4	Jadwin Gymnasium (792); Princeton, NJ
December 29, 2024*; 2:00 p.m., ESPN+		Middle Tennessee	W 64–51	8–4	Jadwin Gymnasium (1,079); Princeton, NJ
December 31, 2024*; 12:00 p.m., ESPN+		Le Moyne	W 75–43	9–4	Jadwin Gymnasium (796); Princeton, NJ
Ivy League regular season
January 4, 2025; 2:30 p.m., ESPN+		Cornell	W 72–39	10–4 (1–0)	Jadwin Gymnasium; Princeton, NJ
January 11, 2025; 2:00 p.m., ESPN+		at Harvard	W 52–50	11–4 (2–0)	Lavietes Pavilion (1,961); Cambridge, MA
January 18, 2025; 2:00 p.m., ESPN+		Dartmouth	W 63–39	12–4 (3–0)	Jadwin Gymnasium (1,111); Princeton, NJ
January 20, 2025; 7:00 p.m., SNY/ESPN+		at Columbia	L 50–58	12–5 (3–1)	Levien Gymnasium (2,217); New York, NY
January 25, 2025; 1:00 p.m., ESPN+		at Cornell	W 62–54	13–5 (4–1)	Newman Arena (257); Ithaca, NY
January 31, 2025; 6:00 p.m., ESPN+		at Yale	W 74–38	14–5 (5–1)	John J. Lee Amphitheater (590); New Haven, CT
February 1, 2025; 5:00 p.m., ESPN+		at Brown	W 60–47	15–5 (6–1)	Pizzitola Sports Center (586); Providence, RI
February 8, 2025; 2:00 p.m., NBCSP/SNY		Penn	W 74–60	15–5 (7–1)	Jadwin Gymnasium (2,631); Princeton, NJ
February 14, 2025; 6:00 p.m., SNY/NBCSP		Brown	W 78–67	17–5 (8–1)	Jadwin Gymnasium (699); Princeton, NJ
February 15, 2025; 5:00 p.m., ESPN+		Yale	W 71–42	18–5 (9–1)	Jadwin Gymnasium (1,254); Princeton, NJ
February 22, 2025; 5:30 p.m., ESPN+		Columbia	L 60–64	18–6 (9–2)	Jadwin Gymnasium (2,431); Princeton, NJ
February 28, 2025; 8:00 p.m., ESPN+		at Harvard	W 70–58	19–6 (10–2)	Lavietes Pavilion (1,636); Cambridge, MA
March 1, 2025; 7:00 p.m., ESPN+		at Dartmouth	W 67–55	20–6 (11–2)	Leede Arena (527); Hanover, NH
March 8, 2025; 2:00 p.m., ESPN+		at Penn	W 67–53	21–6 (12–2)	The Palestra (725); Philadelphia, PA
Ivy League tournament
March 14, 2025; 7:30 p.m., ESPN+	(2)	vs. (3) Harvard; Semifinals	L 67–70	21–7	Pizzitola Sports Center (458); Providence, RI
NCAA tournament
March 19, 2025; 7:00 p.m., ESPNU	(11 B3)	vs. (11 B3) Iowa State; First Four	L 63–68	21–8	Joyce Center (819); Notre Dame, IN
*Non-conference game. ^{#}Rankings from AP poll. (#) Tournament seedings in parentheses. All times are in Eastern.

== Rankings ==
Ranking movements Legend: ██ Increase in ranking ██ Decrease in ranking — = Not ranked RV = Received votes
	Week																				
Poll	Pre	1	2	3	4	5	6	7	8	9	10	11	12	13	14	15	16	17	18	19	Final
AP	RV	—	—	—	—	—	—	—	—	—	—	—	—	—	—	—					Not released
Coaches	RV	—	—	—	—	—	—	—	—	—	—	—	—	—	—	—					

Legend
	Increase in ranking
	Decrease in ranking
	Not ranked previous week
(RV)	Received votes
(NR)	Not ranked and did not receive votes
