= 2024–25 Cornell Big Red women's basketball team =

American college basketball season

2024–25 Cornell Big Red women's basketball
- Conference: Ivy League
- Record: 7–20 (3–11 Ivy)
- Head coach: Emily Garner (1st season)
- Associate head coach: Shannon Bush
- Assistant coaches: LaSashia Connelly; Colleen Corcoran
- Home arena: Newman Arena

2024–25 Ivy League women's basketball standings
	Conf.				Overall
Team	W		L	PCT	W		L	PCT
Columbia	13	–	1	.929	24	–	7	.774
Princeton	12	–	2	.857	21	–	8	.724
Harvard †	11	–	3	.786	24	–	5	.828
Penn	6	–	8	.429	15	–	13	.536
Brown	6	–	8	.429	12	–	15	.444
Cornell	3	–	11	.214	7	–	20	.259
Yale	3	–	11	.214	4	–	23	.148
Dartmouth	2	–	12	.143	8	–	19	.296
† 2025 Ivy League tournament winner

The 2024–25 Cornell Big Red women's basketball team represented Cornell University during the 2024–25 NCAA Division I women's basketball season. The Big Red, led by first-year head coach Emily Garner, play their home games at Newman Arena in Ithaca, New York, as members of the Ivy League.

== Previous season ==
The Big Red finished the 2023–24 season 7–19, 1–13 in Ivy League play, to finish in a tie for last place. They failed to qualify for the Ivy League tournament, as only the top four teams qualify.

On March 11, 2024, the school announced that they would be parting ways with head coach Dayna Smith, ending her 21-year tenure with the school. On April 12, the school announced that they would be hiring Trinity College head coach Emily Garner as the team's new head coach.

== Roster ==
2024–25 Cornell Big Red women's basketball team
Players
Coaches

Pos.	#	Name	Height	Year	Previous school	Hometown
G	0	Azareya Kilgoe	5 ft 4 in (1.63 m)	So	Sanford School	Seaford, Delaware
G/F	1	Alana Andrews	6 ft 2 in (1.88 m)	Fr	Grace Church School	New York, New York
G	2	Paige Engels	5 ft 8 in (1.73 m)	Fr	Loyola Academy	Golf, Illinois
G/F	3	Vivienne Knee	5 ft 9 in (1.75 m)	Jr	Lycée Français de New York	New York, New York
G	4	Sarah Hathorn	5 ft 4 in (1.63 m)	Jr	A&M Consolidated High School	College Station, Texas
G/F	5	Rachel Kaus	6 ft 0 in (1.83 m)	So	Lake Forest High School	Lake Bluff, Illinois
F	10	Jada Davis	6 ft 2 in (1.88 m)	Sr	The Bishop's School	San Diego, California
F	11	Arianna Linoxilakis	6 ft 1 in (1.85 m)	Sr	Weston High School	Weston, Massachusetts
G	12	Audrey Chen	5 ft 7 in (1.7 m)	Fr	La Salle College Prep	South Pasadena, California
C	15	Maya Watts	6 ft 1 in (1.85 m)	So	Arlington High School	Hopewell Junction, New York
G/F	20	Lexi Green	5 ft 9 in (1.75 m)	Sr	Pittsford Mendon High School	Pittsford, New York
G	21	Kelsey Langston	5 ft 7 in (1.7 m)	Fr	Loyola Academy	Wilmette, Illinois
G	22	Clarke Jackson	5 ft 9 in (1.75 m)	So	Gahanna-Lincoln High School	Columbus, Ohio
G	23	Kameryn Perry	5 ft 10 in (1.78 m)	So	Choate Rosemary Hall	Middletown, Connecticut
F	24	Summer Parker-Hall	6 ft 0 in (1.83 m)	Sr	Loyola Academy	Chicago, Illinois
F	32	Emily Pape	6 ft 1 in (1.85 m)	Jr	Maine South High School	Park Ridge, Illinois

Head coach

- Emily Garner (Lafayette)

Assistant coach(es)

- Shannon Bush (Holy Cross)
- LaSashia Connelly (Salem College)
- Colleen Corcoran (Le Moyne)

Legend

- (C) Team captain
- (S) Suspended
- (I) Ineligible
- (W) Walk-on
- Injured
- Current redshirt

Roster
Last update: February 14, 2025

== Schedule and results ==
Date time, TV	Rank^{#}	Opponent^{#}	Result	Record	Site (attendance) city, state
Non-conference regular season
November 4, 2024*; 5:00 pm, ESPN+		at Army	W 60–54	1–0	Christl Arena (250); West Point, NY
November 7, 2024*; 7:00 pm, B1G+		at Rutgers	L 61–72	1–1	Jersey Mike's Arena (1,263); Piscataway, NJ
November 10, 2024*; 2:00 pm, ESPN+		at Marist	L 56–62	1–2	McCann Arena (889); Poughkeepsie, NY
November 14, 2024*; 7:00 pm, ESPN+		Binghamton	W 68–51	2–2	Newman Arena (675); Ithaca, NY
November 19, 2024*; 6:30 pm, ESPN+		Bryant	L 53–60	2–3	Newman Arena (258); Ithaca, NY
November 21, 2024*; 6:00 pm, ESPN+		at Quinnipiac	L 47–56	2–4	M&T Bank Arena (365); Hamden, CT
November 23, 2024*; 7:00 pm, ESPN+		at Albany	L 47–54	2–5	Broadview Center (1,559); Albany, NY
November 27, 2024*; 1:00 pm, ESPN+		Mercyhurst	W 64–63 ^{OT}	3–5	Newman Arena (266); Ithaca, NY
December 1, 2024*; 2:00 pm, B1G+		at Northwestern	L 54–67	3–6	Welsh–Ryan Arena (2,163); Evanston, IL
December 5, 2024*; 6:30 pm, ESPN+		at St. Bonaventure	L 54–56	3–7	Reilly Center (126); St. Bonaventure, NY
December 8, 2024*; 1:00 pm, ESPN+		Lehigh	L 51–73	3–8	Newman Arena (245); Ithaca, NY
December 22, 2024*; 1:00 pm, FloHoops		at Stony Brook	L 40–54	3–9	Stony Brook Arena (736); Stony Brook, NY
December 30, 2024*; 6:00 pm, ESPN+		at Siena	W 76–73	4–9	UHY Center (434); Loudonville, NY
Ivy League regular season
January 4, 2025; 2:30 pm, ESPN+		at Princeton	L 39–72	4–10 (0–1)	Jadwin Gymnasium; Princeton, NJ
January 11, 2025; 1:00 pm, ESPN+		Columbia	L 44–69	4–11 (0–2)	Newman Arena (340); Ithaca, NY
January 18, 2025; 1:00 pm, ESPN+		Penn	L 51–57	4–12 (0–3)	Newman Arena (321); Ithaca, NY
January 20, 2025; 2:00 pm, ESPN+		at Brown	L 39–49	4–13 (0–4)	Pizzitola Sports Center (473); Providence, RI
January 25, 2025; 1:00 pm, ESPN+		Princeton	L 54–62	4–14 (0–5)	Newman Arena (257); Ithaca, NY
January 31, 2025; 6:00 pm, ESPN+		at Dartmouth	W 60–48	5–14 (1–5)	Leede Arena (841); Hanover, NH
February 1, 2025; 5:00 pm, ESPN+		at Harvard	L 60–72	5–15 (1–6)	Lavietes Pavilion (869); Cambridge, MA
February 8, 2025; 2:00 pm, ESPN+		at Yale	W 57–40	6–15 (2–6)	John J. Lee Amphitheater (659); New Haven, CT
February 14, 2025; 6:00 pm, ESPN+		Harvard	L 29–66	6–16 (2–7)	Newman Arena (67); Ithaca, NY
February 15, 2025; 5:00 pm, ESPN+		Dartmouth	W 56–43	7–16 (3–7)	Newman Arena (87); Ithaca, NY
February 22, 2025; 2:30 pm, ESPN+		at Penn	L 63–68	7–17 (3–8)	The Palestra (423); Philadelphia, PA
February 28, 2025; 4:00 pm, ESPN+		Yale	L 46–48	7–18 (3–9)	Newman Arena (317); Ithaca, NY
March 1, 2025; 3:00 pm, ESPN+		Brown	L 36–38	7–19 (3–10)	Newman Arena (588); Ithaca, NY
March 8, 2025; 2:00 pm, ESPN+		at Columbia	L 58–91	7–20 (3–11)	Levien Gymnasium (2,307); New York, NY
*Non-conference game. ^{#}Rankings from AP Poll. (#) Tournament seedings in parentheses. All times are in Eastern.
