= 2024–25 Penn Quakers women's basketball team =

American college basketball season

2024–25 Penn Quakers women's basketball
- Conference: Ivy League
- Record: 15–13 (6–8 Ivy)
- Head coach: Mike McLaughlin (16th season)
- Associate head coach: Kelly Killion
- Assistant coach: Andre Gibbs
- Home arena: Palestra

2024–25 Ivy League women's basketball standings
	Conf.				Overall
Team	W		L	PCT	W		L	PCT
Columbia	13	–	1	.929	24	–	7	.774
Princeton	12	–	2	.857	21	–	8	.724
Harvard †	11	–	3	.786	24	–	5	.828
Penn	6	–	8	.429	15	–	13	.536
Brown	6	–	8	.429	12	–	15	.444
Cornell	3	–	11	.214	7	–	20	.259
Yale	3	–	11	.214	4	–	23	.148
Dartmouth	2	–	12	.143	8	–	19	.296
† 2025 Ivy League tournament winner

The 2024–25 Penn Quakers women's basketball team represented the University of Pennsylvania during the 2024–25 NCAA Division I women's basketball season. The Quakers, led by 15th-year head coach Mike McLaughlin, play their home games at the Palestra in Philadelphia, Pennsylvania as members of the Ivy League.

== Previous season ==
The Quakers finished the 2023–24 season 15–13, 7–7 in Ivy League play, to finish in a tie for fourth place. They were defeated by top-seeded and eventual tournament champions Princeton in the semifinals of the Ivy League tournament.

== Roster====Roster ==
2024–25 Penn Quakers women's basketball team
Players
Coaches

Pos.	#	Name	Height	Year	Previous school	Hometown
G	0	Ashna Tambe	5 ft 7 in (1.7 m)	Fr	Hockaday School	Plano, Texas
G	4	Saniah Caldwell	5 ft 9 in (1.75 m)	Jr	Saddle River Day School	Franklin Lakes, New Jersey
G	5	Stina Almqvist	6 ft 1 in (1.85 m)	Sr	Marks Gymnasium	Kinna, Sweden
G	8	Sarah Miller	5 ft 10 in (1.78 m)	Fr	Xavier College Prep	Phoenix, Arizona
C	10	Tina Njike	6 ft 2 in (1.88 m)	So	Skyline High School	Salt Lake City, Utah
G	11	Simone Sawyer	5 ft 11 in (1.8 m)	Jr	Stevenson High School	Lincolnshire, Illinois
G	12	Brooke Suttle	6 ft 0 in (1.83 m)	Fr	Campbell High School	Atlanta, Georgia
G	14	Reagan Jamison	6 ft 0 in (1.83 m)	Fr	Camas High School	Vancouver, Washington
G	15	Georgia Heine	6 ft 0 in (1.83 m)	Jr	Manasquan High School	Spring Lake Heights, New Jersey
G	20	Abby Sharpe	6 ft 0 in (1.83 m)	So	Plymouth-Whitemarsh High School	Lafayette Hill, Pennsylvania
G	22	Mataya Gayle	5 ft 7 in (1.7 m)	So	River Ridge High School	Woodstock, Georgia
G	23	Ese Ogbevire	5 ft 7 in (1.7 m)	So	Fulshear High School	Katy, Texas
F	24	Helena Lasic	6 ft 4 in (1.93 m)	Jr	Westtown School	Brampton, Ontario
F	25	Katie Collins	6 ft 1 in (1.85 m)	Fr	Manasquan High School	Manasquan, New Jersey
G	32	Lizzy Groetsch	5 ft 10 in (1.78 m)	Sr	North Allegheny High School	Sewickley, Pennsylvania
F	33	Gabriella Kelley	6 ft 1 in (1.85 m)	Fr	San Francisco University High School	San Francisco, California

Head coach

- Mike McLaughlin (Holy Family)

Assistant coach(es)

- Kelly Killion (Holy Family)
- Andre Gibbs (Philadelphia)

Legend

- (C) Team captain
- (S) Suspended
- (I) Ineligible
- (W) Walk-on
- Injured
- Current redshirt

Roster
Last update: February 13, 2025

== Schedule and results ==
Date time, TV	Rank^{#}	Opponent^{#}	Result	Record	Site (attendance) city, state
Non-conference regular season
November 8, 2024*; 2:00 p.m., ESPN+		Merrimack	W 64–52	1–0	Palestra (306); Philadelphia, PA
November 10, 2024*; 11:30 a.m., AmericaEast.TV		at Maine	W 56–52	2–0	Memorial Gymnasium (1,088); Orono, ME
November 13, 2024*; 6:00 p.m., ESPN+		Siena	W 78–47	3–0	Palestra (329); Philadelphia, PA
November 15, 2024*; 4:30 p.m., NBCSP+/ESPN+		Saint Joseph's; Big 5 Classic Pod 2	L 57–68	3–1	Palestra (632); Philadelphia, PA
November 20, 2024*; 7:00 p.m., FloHoops		at Villanova; Big 5 Classic Pod 2	L 64–80	3–2	Finneran Pavilion (1,121); Villanova, PA
November 21, 2024*; 6:00 p.m., ESPN+		UC Irvine	L 68–72 ^{OT}	3–3	Palestra (203); Philadelphia, PA
November 26, 2024*; 6:00 p.m., ESPN+		Immaculata	W 114–39	4–3	Palestra (224); Philadelphia, PA
November 29, 2024*; 1:00 p.m.		vs. Chattanooga; Homewood Suites Classic	W 74–61	5–3	Alico Arena (77); Fort Myers, FL
November 30, 2024*; 1:00 p.m.		vs. California Baptist; Homewood Suites Classic	W 64–51	6–3	Alico Arena (47); Fort Myers, FL
December 6, 2024*; 3:30 p.m., NBCSP+		vs. La Salle; Big 5 Classic 5th-place game	W 74–63	7–3	Finneran Pavilion (1,526); Villanova, PA
December 20, 2024*; 11:30 a.m., ESPN+		Delaware State	W 72–45	8–3	Palestra (521); Philadelphia, PA
December 30, 2024*; 3:00 p.m., ESPN+		at Arizona State	L 67–73	8–4	Desert Financial Arena (1,219); Tempe, AZ
December 31, 2024*; 4:00 p.m., GSACSN		at Benedictine Mesa	W 86–75	9–4	BENU PEC (50); Mesa, AZ
Ivy League regular season
January 4, 2025; 2:00 p.m., ESPN+		Columbia	L 59–74	9–5 (0–1)	Palestra (732); Philadelphia, PA
January 11, 2025; 2:00 p.m., ESPN+		Dartmouth	L 49–61	9–6 (0–2)	Palestra (482); Philadelphia, PA
January 18, 2025; 1:00 p.m., ESPN+		at Cornell	W 57–51	10–6 (1–2)	Newman Arena (321); Ithaca, NY
January 20, 2025; 2:00 p.m., NBCSP+/ESPN+		Harvard	L 44–73	10–7 (1–3)	Palestra (458); Philadelphia, PA
January 25, 2025; 2:00 p.m., ESPN+		at Columbia	L 54–79	10–8 (1–4)	Levien Gymnasium (1,604); New York, NY
January 31, 2025; 7:00 p.m., ESPN+		at Brown	L 57–65	10–9 (1–5)	Pizzitola Sports Center (341); Providence, RI
February 1, 2025; 5:30 p.m., ESPN+		at Yale	W 80–60	11–9 (2–5)	John J. Lee Amphitheater (581); New Haven, CT
February 8, 2025; 2:00 p.m., NBCSP/ESPN+		at Princeton	L 60–74	11–10 (2–6)	Jadwin Gymnasium (2,631); Princeton, NJ
February 14, 2025; 6:00 p.m., ESPN+		Yale	W 71–59	12–10 (3–6)	Palestra (249); Philadelphia, PA
February 15, 2025; 4:00 p.m., ESPN+		Brown	W 73–61	13–10 (4–6)	Palestra (1,005); Philadelphia, PA
February 22, 2025; 2:30 p.m., ESPN+		Cornell	W 68–63	14–10 (5–6)	Palestra (423); Philadelphia, PA
February 28, 2025; 8:00 p.m., ESPN+		at Dartmouth	W 66–37	15–10 (6–6)	Leede Arena (450); Hanover, NH
March 1, 2025; 7:00 p.m., ESPN+		at Harvard	L 44–62	15–11 (6–7)	Lavietes Pavilion (929); Cambridge, MA
March 8, 2025; 2:00 p.m., ESPN+		Princeton	L 53–67	15–12 (6–8)	Palestra (725); Philadelphia, PA
Ivy League tournament
March 14, 2025; 4:30 p.m., ESPN+	(4)	vs. (1) Columbia; Semifinals	L 54–60	15–13	Pizzitola Sports Center (1,114); Providence, RI
*Non-conference game. ^{#}Rankings from AP poll. (#) Tournament seedings in parentheses. All times are in Eastern.
