= 2024–25 Brown Bears women's basketball team =

American college basketball season

2024–25 Brown Bears women's basketball
- Conference: Ivy League
- Record: 12–15 (6–8 Ivy)
- Head coach: Monique LeBlanc (5th season)
- Assistant coaches: Tyler Patch; Clint Williams; Brianna Thomas
- Home arena: Pizzitola Sports Center

2024–25 Ivy League women's basketball standings
	Conf.				Overall
Team	W		L	PCT	W		L	PCT
Columbia	13	–	1	.929	24	–	7	.774
Princeton	12	–	2	.857	21	–	8	.724
Harvard †	11	–	3	.786	24	–	5	.828
Penn	6	–	8	.429	15	–	13	.536
Brown	6	–	8	.429	12	–	15	.444
Cornell	3	–	11	.214	7	–	20	.259
Yale	3	–	11	.214	4	–	23	.148
Dartmouth	2	–	12	.143	8	–	19	.296
† 2025 Ivy League tournament winner

The 2024–25 Brown Bears women's basketball team represented Brown University during the 2024–25 NCAA Division I women's basketball season. The Bears, led by fifth-year head coach Monique LeBlanc, play their home games at the Pizzitola Sports Center in Providence, Rhode Island as members of the Ivy League.

== Previous season ==
The Bears finished the 2023–24 season 16–11 overall, and 7–7 in Ivy League play to tie for fourth place.

== Roster ==
2024–25 Brown Bears women's basketball team
Players
Coaches

Pos.	#	Name	Height	Year	Previous school	Hometown
G	2	Gia Powell	5 ft 8 in (1.73 m)	Fr	Meadowdale High School	Edmonds, WA
G	4	Isabella Mauricio	5 ft 4 in (1.63 m)	Sr	Amador Valley High School	Pleasanton, CA
G	5	Olivia Young	5 ft 11 in (1.8 m)	So	Cardinal Gibbons High School	Durham, NC
G	8	Sela Klein	5 ft 11 in (1.8 m)	Fr	New Trier Township High School	Wilmette, IL
F	11	Alyssa Moreland	5 ft 11 in (1.8 m)	Jr	Tilton School	Beverly, MA
G	14	Mady Calhoun	5 ft 10 in (1.78 m)	Jr	Barrington High School	Barrington, RI
F	15	Beth Nelson	6 ft 0 in (1.83 m)	Jr	Oakland High School	Murfreesboro, TN
G	21	Grace Arnolie	5 ft 8 in (1.73 m)	Jr	James Madison High School	Vienna, VA
G	22	Mackenzie Leahy	5 ft 8 in (1.73 m)	Jr	Jacobs High School	West Dundee, IL
F	23	Ada Anamekwe	6 ft 0 in (1.83 m)	Jr	Plano East High School	Parker, TX
C	25	Gianna Aiello	6 ft 4 in (1.93 m)	Sr	Matawan Regional High School	Matawan, NJ
F	33	Amia Ofunrein	6 ft 1 in (1.85 m)	Fr	Stony Point High School	Round Rock, TX

Head coach

- Monique LeBlanc (Bucknell)

Assistant coach(es)

- Tyler Patch (Rhode Island College)
- Clint Williams (Tuskegee)
- Brianna Thomas (Duquesne)

Legend

- (C) Team captain
- (S) Suspended
- (I) Ineligible
- (W) Walk-on
- Injured
- Current redshirt

Roster
Last update: February 15, 2025

== Schedule and results ==
Date time, TV	Rank^{#}	Opponent^{#}	Result	Record	Site (attendance) city, state
Non-conference regular season
November 4, 2024*; 7:00 p.m., B1G+		at No. 25 Indiana	L 60–82	0–1	Simon Skjodt Assembly Hall (10,050); Bloomington, IN
November 9, 2024*; 2:00 p.m., SNY		at Monmouth	W 81–61	1–1	OceanFirst Bank Center (664); West Long Branch, NJ
November 13, 2024*; 7:00 p.m., ESPN+		Holy Cross	L 53–68	1–2	Pizzitola Sports Center (326); Providence, RI
November 13, 2024*; 7:00 p.m., NESN		Lehigh	L 55–62	1–3	Pizzitola Sports Center (321); Providence, RI
November 13, 2024*; 7:00 p.m., ESPN+		Johnson & Wales	W 104–47	2–3	Pizzitola Sports Center (282); Providence, RI
November 23, 2024*; 1:00 p.m., MeTV		at Rhode Island	L 58–63	2–4	Ryan Center (1,059); Kingston, RI
November 28, 2024*; 1:30 p.m.		vs. Kent State; Puerto Rico Clasico	L 51–74	2–5	Coliseo Rubén Rodríguez (100); Bayamón, PR
November 30, 2024*; 1:30 p.m.		vs. Colorado State; Puerto Rico Clasico	W 69–63	3–5	Coliseo Rubén Rodríguez (100); Bayamón, PR
December 5, 2024*; 7:00 p.m., ESPN+		Stonehill	W 78–45	4–5	Pizzitola Sports Center (321); Providence, RI
December 7, 2024*; 2:00 p.m., FloHoops		at Providence	L 81–87 ^{OT}	4–6	Alumni Hall (725); Providence, RI
December 10, 2024*; 4:00 p.m., NESN		Bryant	W 53–50	5–6	Pizzitola Sports Center (211); Providence, RI
December 21, 2024*; 2:00 p.m., ESPN+		New Hampshire	W 70–43	6–6	Pizzitola Sports Center (300); Providence, RI
December 29, 2024*; 3:00 p.m., ESPN+		at No. 11 TCU	L 47–79	6–7	Schollmaier Arena (3,012); Fort Worth, TX
Ivy League regular season
January 4, 2025; 2:00 p.m., ESPN+		Dartmouth	L 48–64	6–8 (0–1)	Pizzitola Sports Center (397); Providence, RI
January 11, 2025; 2:00 p.m., ESPN+		Yale	W 77–69	7–8 (1–1)	Pizzitola Sports Center (390); Providence, RI
January 18, 2025; 2:00 p.m., ESPN+		at Harvard	L 53–83	7–9 (1–2)	Lavietes Pavilion (807); Cambridge, MA
January 20, 2025; 2:00 p.m., ESPN+		Cornell	W 49–39	8–9 (2–2)	Pizzitola Sports Center (473); Providence, RI
January 25, 2025; 2:00 p.m., NESN+		at Dartmouth	W 64–56	9–9 (3–2)	Leede Arena (754); Hanover, NH
January 31, 2025; 7:00 p.m., ESPN+		Penn	W 65–57	10–9 (4–2)	Pizzitola Sports Center (341); Providence, RI
February 1, 2025; 5:00 p.m., ESPN+		Princeton	L 47–60	10–10 (4–3)	Pizzitola Sports Center (586); Providence, RI
February 8, 2025; 2:00 p.m., ESPN+		Columbia	L 40–78	10–11 (4–4)	Pizzitola Sports Center (493); Providence, RI
February 14, 2025; 7:00 p.m., ESPN+		at Princeton	L 67–78	10–12 (4–5)	Jadwin Gymnasium (699); Princeton, NJ
February 15, 2025; 4:00 p.m., ESPN+		at Penn	L 61–73	10–13 (4–6)	Palestra (1,005); Philadelphia, PA
February 22, 2025; 2:00 p.m., ESPN+		Harvard	L 57–60	10–14 (4–7)	Pizzitola Sports Center (450); Providence, RI
February 28, 2025; 7:00 p.m., ESPN+		at Columbia	L 44–70	10–15 (4–8)	Levien Gymnasium (1,368); New York, NY
March 1, 2025; 3:00 p.m., ESPN+		at Cornell	W 38–36	11–15 (5–8)	Newman Arena (588); Ithaca, NY
March 8, 2025; 2:00 p.m., ESPN+		at Yale	W 53–44	12–15 (6–8)	John J. Lee Amphitheater (789); New Haven, CT
*Non-conference game. ^{#}Rankings from AP poll. (#) Tournament seedings in parentheses. All times are in Eastern.
