= 2024–25 Michigan State Spartans women's basketball team =

American college basketball season

2024–25 Michigan State Spartans women's basketball

Acrisure Holiday Invitational champions

NCAA tournament, Second Round
- Conference: Big Ten Conference
- Record: 22–10 (11–7 Big Ten)
- Head coach: Robyn Fralick (2nd season)
- Associate head coach: Kim Cameron
- Assistant coaches: Maria Kasza; Marwan Miller
- Home arena: Breslin Center

2024–25 Big Ten women's basketball standings
	Conf.				Overall
Team	W		L	PCT	W		L	PCT
No. 5 USC	17	–	1	.944	31	–	4	.886
No. 3 UCLA †	16	–	2	.889	34	–	3	.919
No. 19 Ohio State	13	–	5	.722	26	–	7	.788
No. 12 Maryland	13	–	5	.722	25	–	8	.758
No. 25 Michigan	11	–	7	.611	23	–	11	.676
Michigan State	11	–	7	.611	22	–	10	.688
Illinois	11	–	7	.611	22	–	10	.688
Oregon	10	–	8	.556	20	–	12	.625
Indiana	10	–	8	.556	20	–	13	.606
Nebraska	10	–	8	.556	21	–	12	.636
Iowa	10	–	8	.556	23	–	11	.676
Washington	9	–	9	.500	19	–	14	.576
Minnesota	8	–	10	.444	25	–	11	.694
Wisconsin	4	–	14	.222	13	–	17	.433
Rutgers	3	–	15	.167	13	–	20	.394
Purdue	3	–	15	.167	10	–	19	.345
Northwestern	2	–	16	.111	9	–	18	.333
Penn State	1	–	17	.056	10	–	19	.345
† 2025 Big Ten tournament winner As of April 7, 2025; Rankings from AP poll

The 2024–25 Michigan State Spartans women's basketball team represented Michigan State University during the 2024–25 NCAA Division I women's basketball season. The Spartans were led by second-year head coach Robyn Fralick and played their home games at the Breslin Center in East Lansing, Michigan as members of the Big Ten Conference. They finished the regular season 22–10, 11–7 in Big Ten play to finish in a three-way tie for fifth place. As the No. 6 seed in the Big Ten tournament, they lost to Iowa in the second round. They received an at-large bid to the NCAA tournament as the No. 7 seed Spokane 1 region. They defeated Harvard in the first round before losing to NC State in the second round.

== Previous season ==
The Spartans finished the 2023–24 season 22–9, 12–6 in Big Ten play to finish in fourth place. They lost in the quarterfinals of the Big Ten tournament to Nebraska. They received an at-large bid to the NCAA tournament as the No. 8 seed in the Albany Regional 1 where they lost in the first round to North Carolina.

== Offseason ==
=== Departures ===
Michigan State departures
Name	Num	Pos.	Height	Year	Hometown	Reason for Departure
DeeDee Hagemann	0	G	5'7"	Junior	Detroit, MI	Transferred to Memphis
Tory Ozment	1	G/F	6'1"	Graduate student	Buford, GA	Graduated
Gabby Elliott	3	G	5'10"	Senior	Detroit, MI	Transferred to Penn State
Bree Robinson	10	G	5'8"	Freshman	Mississauga, ON	Transferred to James Madison
Moira Joiner	22	G	5'10"	Graduate student	Saginaw, MI	Graduated
Lauren Ross	24	G	5'10"	(redshirt) Junior	Muskegon, MI	Transferred to Purdue Fort Wayne

=== Incoming transfers ===
Michigan State incoming transfers
Name	Num	Pos.	Height	Year	Hometown	Previous School
Jaddan Simmons	1	G	5'9"	Graduate student	Green Bay, WI	Arizona State
Emma Shumate	5	G	6'1"	(redshirt) Junior	Dresden, OH	Ohio State
Grace VanSlooten	14	F	6'3"	Junior	Toledo, OH	Oregon
Nyla Hampton	22	G	5'7"	Senior	Huber Heights, OH	Ball State

=== Recruiting classes ===
==== 2024 recruiting class ====
College recruiting information
Name	Hometown	School	Height	Weight	Commit date
Juliann Woodard; F	North Vernon, IN	Jennings County High School	6 ft 0 in (1.83 m)	N/A	
Juliann Woodard; F	Recruit ratings: ESPN: (93)				
Sinai Douglas; PG	Toledo, OH	Start High School	5 ft 5 in (1.65 m)	N/A	
Sinai Douglas; PG	Recruit ratings: ESPN: (91)				
Overall recruit ranking:
Note: In many cases, Scout, Rivals, 247Sports, On3, and ESPN may conflict in their listings of height and weight.; In these cases, the average was taken. ESPN grades are on a 100-point scale.; Sources: "2024 Player Commits". ESPN. Archived from the original on November 6, 2024.

==== 2025 recruiting class ====
College recruiting information (2025)
Name	Hometown	School	Height	Weight	Commit date
Jordan Ode; G	Maple Grove, MN	Maple Grove High School	5 ft 11 in (1.80 m)	N/A	
Jordan Ode; G	Recruit ratings: ESPN: (95)				
Amy Terrian; PG	Pewaukee, WI	Pewaukee High School	5 ft 8 in (1.73 m)	N/A	
Amy Terrian; PG	Recruit ratings: ESPN: (91)				
Anna Terrian; PG	Pewaukee, WI	Pewaukee High School	5 ft 8 in (1.73 m)	N/A	
Anna Terrian; PG	Recruit ratings: ESPN: (91)				
Overall recruit ranking:
Note: In many cases, Scout, Rivals, 247Sports, On3, and ESPN may conflict in their listings of height and weight.; In these cases, the average was taken. ESPN grades are on a 100-point scale.; Sources: "2025 Player Commits". ESPN. Archived from the original on November 6, 2024.

==== 2026 recruiting class ====
College recruiting information (2026)
Name	Hometown	School	Height	Weight	Commit date
Lilly Williams; P	Farmington Hills, MI	Homeschool	6 ft 5 in (1.96 m)	N/A	
Lilly Williams; P	Recruit ratings: ESPN: (95)				
Overall recruit ranking:
Note: In many cases, Scout, Rivals, 247Sports, On3, and ESPN may conflict in their listings of height and weight.; In these cases, the average was taken. ESPN grades are on a 100-point scale.; Sources: "2025 Player Commits". ESPN. Archived from the original on November 6, 2024.

== Roster ==
2024–25 Michigan State Spartans women's basketball team
Players
Coaches

Pos.	#	Name	Height	Year	Previous school	Hometown
G	0	Sinai Douglas	5 ft 4 in (1.63 m)	Fr	Toledo Start	Toledo, OH
G	1	Jaddan Simmons	5 ft 9 in (1.75 m)	GS	Arizona State	Houston, TX
G	2	Abbey Kimball	5 ft 10 in (1.78 m)	Jr	West Catholic	Grand Rapids, MI
G	4	Theryn Hallock	5 ft 10 in (1.78 m)	Jr	Forest Hills Central	Grand Rapids, MI
G	5	Emma Shumate	6 ft 1 in (1.85 m)	RS Jr	Ohio State	Dresden, OH
F	10	Helen Holley (W)	6 ft 1 in (1.85 m)	Fr	Gilmour Academy	Cleveland, OH
G/F	11	Jocelyn Tate	5 ft 10 in (1.78 m)	Sr	Bowling Green	Pickerington, OH
F	12	Isaline Alexander	6 ft 3 in (1.91 m)	RS Jr	Bill Crothers Secondary	Keswick, ON
F	14	Grace VanSlooten	6 ft 3 in (1.91 m)	Jr	Oregon	Toledo, OH
C	15	Inés Sotelo	6 ft 3 in (1.91 m)	Fr	Duran Maquinaria Ensino	Ourense, Spain
C	21	Mary Meng	6 ft 5 in (1.96 m)	RS Fr	Midview	Grafton, OH
G	22	Nyla Hampton (C)	5 ft 7 in (1.7 m)	GS	Wayne	Huber Heights, OH
F	33	Juliann Woodard	6 ft 0 in (1.83 m)	Fr	Jennings County	North Vernon, IN
G	35	Kennedy Blair	5 ft 9 in (1.75 m)	RS Fr	Divine Child	Dearborn, MI
G	40	Julia Ayrault (C)	6 ft 2 in (1.88 m)	GS	Grosse Pointe	Gross Pointe, MI

Head coach

- Robyn Fralick (Davidson)

Assistant coach(es)

- Kim Cameron (Michigan Tech)
- Maria Kasza (Michigan Tech)
- Marwan Miller (Franklin)

Legend

- (C) Team captain
- (S) Suspended
- (I) Ineligible
- (W) Walk-on
- Injured
- Current redshirt

Roster

== Schedule and results ==
Date time, TV	Rank^{#}	Opponent^{#}	Result	Record	High points	High rebounds	High assists	Site (attendance) city, state
Exhibition
October 28, 2024*; 6:30 p.m., B1G+		Wayne State (MI)	W 101–40		16 – Tied	9 – Kimball	8 – Ayrault	Breslin Center (2,626); East Lansing, MI
Regular season
November 5, 2024*; 6:30 p.m., B1G+		Oakland	W 107–42	1–0	15 – VanSlooten	9 – VanSlooten	6 – Simmons	Breslin Center (2,549); East Lansing, MI
November 8, 2024*; 7:00 p.m., B1G+		Yale	W 100–44	2–0	19 – VanSlooten	7 – Blair	4 – Tied	Breslin Center (2,893); East Lansing, MI
November 11, 2024*; 6:30 p.m., B1G+		Eastern Michigan	W 95–49	3–0	18 – Hallock	7 – Simmons	6 – Simmons	Breslin Center (2,515); East Lansing, MI
November 14, 2024*; 6:30 p.m., B1G+		Eastern Kentucky	W 96–54	4–0	19 – Ayrault	9 – VanSlooten	9 – Hallock	Breslin Center (2,631); East Lansing, MI
November 17, 2024*; 5:00 p.m., ESPN+		at Western Michigan	W 79–42	5–0	18 – VanSlooten	13 – VanSlooten	4 – VanSlooten	University Arena (2,051); Kalamazoo, MI
November 20, 2024*; 6:30 p.m., B1G+		Detroit Mercy	W 101–44	6–0	17 – Woodard	7 – Tied	5 – VanSlooten	Breslin Center (2,812); East Lansing, MI
November 26, 2024*; 2:00 p.m., TruTV		vs. California; Acrisure Classic semifinal	W 78–72	7–0	22 – Ayrault	9 – Ayrault	3 – Simmons	Acrisure Arena (325); Palm Desert, CA
November 27, 2024*; 4:30 p.m., TruTV		vs. Vanderbilt; Acrisure Classic championship	W 78–70	8–0	25 – VanSlooten	12 – Ayrault	6 – Hallock	Acrisure Arena (615); Palm Desert, CA
December 8, 2024*; 2:00 p.m., B1G+	No. 24	DePaul	W 89–61	9–0	18 – Simmons	12 – Ayrault	5 – Tied	Breslin Center (3,416); East Lansing, MI
December 15, 2024; 12:00 p.m., BTN	No. 17	No. 21 Iowa	W 68–66	10–0 (1–0)	19 – Ayrault	7 – Tied	3 – Tied	Breslin Center (5,939); East Lansing, MI
December 19, 2024*; 12:00 p.m., Baller TV	No. 15	vs. Montana; West Palm Beach Classic	W 69–38	11–0	15 – Ayrault	4 – Blair	4 – Hallock	Rubin Arena (173); West Palm Beach, FL
December 20, 2024*; 4:30 p.m., Baller TV	No. 15	vs. Alabama; West Palm Beach Classic	L 67–82	11–1	18 – Ayrault	9 – VanSlooten	3 – Tate	Rubin Arena (215); West Palm Beach, FL
December 29, 2024; 1:00 p.m., B1G+	No. 19	at No. 8 Maryland	L 66–72	11–2 (1–1)	20 – Hallock	12 – Ayrault	4 – Tate	Xfinity Center (9,200); College Park, MD
January 1, 2025; 2:00 p.m., B1G+	No. 21	Purdue	W 77–59	12–2 (2–1)	19 – Tate	11 – Tate	5 – Simmons	Breslin Center (5,324); East Lansing, MI
January 8, 2025; 8:00 p.m., B1G+	No. 20	at Nebraska	L 80–85	12–3 (2–2)	21 – Ayrault	9 – Ayrault	5 – Simmons	Pinnacle Bank Arena (4,903); Lincoln, NE
January 12, 2025; 2:00 p.m., B1G+	No. 20	Washington	W 80–68	13–3 (3–2)	19 – Tied	12 – VanSlooten	5 – Tied	Breslin Center (4,192); East Lansing, MI
January 15, 2025; 7:00 p.m., B1G+	No. 22	at Rutgers	W 70–60	14–3 (4–2)	12 – Tied	9 – Ayrault	5 – Tate	Jersey Mike's Arena (1,585); Piscataway, NJ
January 19, 2025; 3:00 p.m., B1G+	No. 22	at Illinois	W 86–68	15–3 (5–2)	26 – Hallock	7 – Simmons	6 – Simmons	State Farm Center (5,896); Champaign, IL
January 22, 2025; 6:30 p.m., B1G+	No. 21	Penn State	W 82–61	16–3 (6–2)	17 – Hallock	5 – Tied	5 – Tied	Breslin Center (3,208); East Lansing, MI
January 25, 2025; 12:00 p.m., BTN	No. 21	at No. 24 Michigan; Rivalry	W 88–58	17–3 (7–2)	25 – Hallock	13 – Ayrault	5 – Hampton	Crisler Center (10,873); Ann Arbor, MI
January 30, 2025; 6:00 p.m., BTN	No. 16	Oregon	L 59–63	17–4 (7–3)	14 – Tied	9 – Ayrault	3 – Tied	Breslin Center (3,521); East Lansing, MI
February 2, 2025; 3:00 p.m., B1G+	No. 16	at Northwestern	W 89–75	18–4 (8–3)	20 – VanSlooten	6 – VanSlooten	6 – Simmons	Welsh–Ryan Arena (1,861); Evanston, IL
February 9, 2025; 2:00 p.m., FS1	No. 20	Michigan; Rivalry	L 61–71	18–5 (8–4)	15 – VanSlooten	12 – VanSlooten	3 – Simmons	Breslin Center (11,043); East Lansing, MI
February 12, 2025; 6:30 p.m., B1G+	No. 22	Wisconsin	W 91–71	19–5 (9–4)	22 – VanSlooten	5 – Tied	6 – Simmons	Breslin Center (2,275); East Lansing, MI
February 16, 2025; 9:00 p.m., BTN	No. 22	at No. 1 UCLA	L 69–75	19–6 (9–5)	19 – Hallock	7 – VanSlooten	3 – Hallock	Pauley Pavilion (7,563); Los Angeles, CA
February 19, 2025; 9:30 p.m., Peacock	No. 22	at No. 4 USC	L 75–83	19–7 (9–6)	29 – VanSlooten	10 – Ayrault	3 – Tied	Galen Center (5,823); Los Angeles, CA
February 23, 2025; 2:00 p.m., BTN	No. 22	Indiana	W 73–65	20–7 (10–6)	17 – VanSlooten	8 – Ayrault	5 – Hallock	Breslin Center (5,657); East Lansing, MI
February 26, 2025; 7:00 p.m., B1G+	No. 23	at No. 12 Ohio State	L 78–89	20–8 (10–7)	29 – Hallock	9 – VanSlooten	4 – Ayrault	Value City Arena (7,207); Columbus, OH
March 1, 2025; 2:00 p.m., B1G+	No. 23	Minnesota	W 73–58	21–8 (11–7)	15 – VanSlooten	9 – Ayrault	4 – Tied	Breslin Center (7,616); East Lansing, MI
Big Ten tournament
March 6, 2025; 9:00 p.m., BTN	(6) No. 24	vs. (11) Iowa; Second Round	L 61–74	21–9	17 – Ayrault	10 – VanSlooten	5 – Simmons	Gainbridge Fieldhouse (7,028); Indianapolis, IN
NCAA tournament
March 22, 2025*; 4:30 p.m., ESPNews	(7 S1)	vs. (10 S1) Harvard; First Round	W 64–50	22–9	17 – VanSlooten	10 – VanSlooten	4 – Hampton	Reynolds Coliseum (4,871); Raleigh, NC
March 24, 2025*; 12:00 p.m., ESPN	(7 S1)	at (2 S1) No. 9 NC State; Second Round	L 49–83	22–10	15 – VanSlooten	11 – VanSlooten	2 – Simmons	Reynolds Coliseum (4,694); Raleigh, NC
*Non-conference game. ^{#}Rankings from AP Poll. (#) Tournament seedings in parentheses. S1=Spokane 1. All times are in Eastern Time.

== Rankings ==
Ranking movements Legend: ██ Increase in ranking ██ Decrease in ranking — = Not ranked RV = Received votes т = Tied with team above or below
	Week																				
Poll	Pre	1	2	3	4	5	6	7	8	9	10	11	12	13	14	15	16	17	18	19	Final
AP	RV	RV	RV	RV	24	17	15	19	21	20	22	21	16	20	22	22	23	24	RV	RV	Not released
Coaches	—	RV	RV	RV	25	19	17	19	21	21	22	22	17	20	22	21	22	24т	RV	RV	

== See also ==
- 2024–25 Michigan State Spartans men's basketball team
