= 2024–25 Yale Bulldogs women's basketball team =

American college basketball season

2024–25 Yale Bulldogs women's basketball
- Conference: Ivy League
- Record: 4–23 (3–11 Ivy)
- Head coach: Dalila Eshe (3rd season)
- Assistant coaches: Amber Raisner; Helen Tau; Hannah Early Vaughn
- Home arena: John J. Lee Amphitheater

2024–25 Ivy League women's basketball standings
	Conf.				Overall
Team	W		L	PCT	W		L	PCT
Columbia	13	–	1	.929	24	–	7	.774
Princeton	12	–	2	.857	21	–	8	.724
Harvard †	11	–	3	.786	24	–	5	.828
Penn	6	–	8	.429	15	–	13	.536
Brown	6	–	8	.429	12	–	15	.444
Cornell	3	–	11	.214	7	–	20	.259
Yale	3	–	11	.214	4	–	23	.148
Dartmouth	2	–	12	.143	8	–	19	.296
† 2025 Ivy League tournament winner

The 2024–25 Yale Bulldogs women's basketball team represented Yale University during the 2024–25 NCAA Division I women's basketball season. The Bulldogs, led by third-year head coach Dalila Eshe, played their home games at John J. Lee Amphitheater in New Haven, Connecticut as members of the Ivy League.

== Previous season ==
The Bulldogs finished the 2023–24 season 8–19, 5–9 in Ivy League play, to finish in sixth place. They failed to qualify for the Ivy League tournament, as only the top four teams qualify.

== Roster ==
2024–25 Yale Bulldogs women's basketball team
Players
Coaches

Pos.	#	Name	Height	Year	Previous school	Hometown
G	0	Avery Lee	5 ft 8 in (1.73 m)	Sr	Menlo School	Los Altos Hills, California
G	1	Ciniya Moore	5 ft 10 in (1.78 m)	Fr	IMG Academy	Bradenton, Florida
G	2	Abigail Long	5 ft 7 in (1.7 m)	Fr	Shawnee Mission East High School	Mission Hills, Kansas
G	4	Lucy Lynn	5 ft 7 in (1.7 m)	So	Gonzaga Prep	Liberty Lake, Washington
G	5	Magdalena Schmidt	5 ft 11 in (1.8 m)	Fr	BG BRG Gmunden and Ballsportgymnasium Wien	Gmunden, Austria
G	10	Ke'iara Odume	5 ft 11 in (1.8 m)	Fr	Loomis Chaffee School	Syracuse, New York
F	11	Ana Guillen	6 ft 0 in (1.83 m)	So	Wisconsin	Badalona, Spain
F	20	Grace Thybulle	6 ft 3 in (1.91 m)	Sr	Irvington High School	Irvington, New York
G	21	Kiley Capstraw	5 ft 11 in (1.8 m)	Jr	West Orange High School	West Orange, New Jersey
G	22	Marisa Chapman	5 ft 9 in (1.75 m)	Fr	Storm King School	Middletown, New York
G	23	Lola Lesmond	6 ft 0 in (1.83 m)	Jr	Worcester Academy	Six-Fours-les-Plages, France
G/F	24	Mackenzie Egger	6 ft 0 in (1.83 m)	Sr	Mount Pleasant High School	Mount Pleasant, Michigan

Head coach

- Dalila Eshe (Florida)

Assistant coach(es)

- Amber Raisner (Union (NY))
- Helen Tau (Texas)
- Hannah Early Vaughn (Davidson)

Legend

- (C) Team captain
- (S) Suspended
- (I) Ineligible
- (W) Walk-on
- Injured
- Current redshirt

Roster
Last update: February 14, 2025

== Schedule and results ==
Date time, TV	Rank^{#}	Opponent^{#}	Result	Record	Site (attendance) city, state
Non-conference regular season
November 4, 2024*; 5:00 pm, ESPN+		Monmouth	W 64–61	1–0	John J. Lee Amphitheater (398); New Haven, CT
November 8, 2024*; 7:00 pm, B1G+		at Michigan State	L 44–100	1–1	Breslin Center (2,893); East Lansing, MI
November 12, 2024*; 5:00 pm, FloHoops		at Hofstra	L 61–75	1–2	Mack Sports Complex (464); Hempstead, NY
November 15, 2024*; 6:00 pm, ESPN+		Stony Brook	L 48–62	1–3	John J. Lee Amphitheater (453); New Haven, CT
November 19, 2024*; 7:00 pm, ESPN+		Merrimack	L 45–50	1–4	John J. Lee Amphitheater (372); New Haven, CT
November 24, 2024*; 12:00 pm, ESPN+		Pacific	L 50–60	1–5	John J. Lee Amphitheater (427); New Haven, CT
November 26, 2024*; 7:00 pm, ESPN+		at Marist	L 65–67	1–6	McCann Arena (901); Poughkeepsie, NY
November 29, 2024*; 1:30 pm, ESPN+		at Bryant	L 52–67	1–7	Chace Athletic Center (287); Smithfield, RI
December 1, 2024*; 12:00 pm, ACCNX		at Syracuse	L 50–78	1–8	JMA Wireless Dome (3,036); Syracuse, NY
December 4, 2024*; 6:00 pm, ESPN+		Fordham	L 54–71	1–9	John J. Lee Amphitheater (459); New Haven, CT
December 7, 2024*; 1:00 pm, ESPN+		at FIU	L 60–82	1–10	Ocean Bank Convocation Center (494); Miami, FL
December 9, 2024*; 6:00 pm, ESPN+		at Quinnipiac	L 50–76	1–11	M&T Bank Arena (419); Hamden, CT
December 29, 2024*; 2:00 pm, ESPN+		Boston University	L 56–77	1–12	John J. Lee Amphitheater (444); New Haven, CT
Ivy League regular season
January 4, 2025; 2:00 pm, ESPN+		Harvard	L 43–61	1–13 (0–1)	John J. Lee Amphitheater (564); New Haven, CT
January 11, 2025; 2:00 pm, ESPN+		at Brown	L 69–77	1–14 (0–2)	Pizzitola Sports Center (390); Providence, RI
January 18, 2025; 2:00 pm, ESPN+		Columbia	L 64–84	1–15 (0–3)	John J. Lee Amphitheater (606); New Haven, CT
January 20, 2025; 6:00 pm, ESPN+		at Dartmouth	W 70–67	2–15 (1–3)	Leede Arena (584); Hanover, NH
January 25, 2025; 2:00 pm, ESPN+		at Harvard	L 35–91	2–16 (1–4)	Lavietes Pavilion (890); Cambridge, MA
January 31, 2025; 6:00 pm, ESPN+		Princeton	L 38–74	2–17 (1–5)	John J. Lee Amphitheater (590); New Haven, CT
February 1, 2025; 5:30 pm, ESPN+		Penn	L 60–80	2–18 (1–6)	John J. Lee Amphitheater (581); New Haven, CT
February 8, 2025; 2:00 pm, ESPN+		Cornell	L 40–57	2–19 (1–7)	John J. Lee Amphitheater (659); New Haven, CT
February 14, 2025; 6:00 pm, ESPN+		at Penn	L 59–71	2–20 (1–8)	The Palestra (249); Philadelphia, PA
February 15, 2025; 5:00 pm, ESPN+		at Princeton	L 42–71	2–21 (1–9)	Jadwin Gymnasium (1,254); Princeton, NJ
February 22, 2025; 2:00 pm, ESPN+		Dartmouth	W 76–59	3–21 (2–9)	John J. Lee Amphitheater (646); New Haven, CT
February 28, 2025; 4:00 pm, ESPN+		at Cornell	W 48–46	4–21 (3–9)	Newman Arena (317); Ithaca, NY
March 1, 2025; 2:00 pm, ESPN+		at Columbia	L 49–77	4–22 (3–10)	Levien Gymnasium (1,427); New York, NY
March 8, 2025; 2:00 pm, ESPN+		Brown	L 44–53	4–23 (3–11)	John J. Lee Amphitheater (789); New Haven, CT
*Non-conference game. ^{#}Rankings from AP Poll. (#) Tournament seedings in parentheses. All times are in Eastern.
