= 2024–25 Dartmouth Big Green women's basketball team =

American college basketball season

2024–25 Dartmouth Big Green women's basketball
- Conference: Ivy League
- Record: 8–19 (2–12 Ivy)
- Head coach: Linda Cimino (2nd season)
- Associate head coach: Robert Isme
- Assistant coaches: Anh-Dao Tran; Alyssa Fisher
- Home arena: Leede Arena

2024–25 Ivy League women's basketball standings
	Conf.				Overall
Team	W		L	PCT	W		L	PCT
Columbia	13	–	1	.929	24	–	7	.774
Princeton	12	–	2	.857	21	–	8	.724
Harvard †	11	–	3	.786	24	–	5	.828
Penn	6	–	8	.429	15	–	13	.536
Brown	6	–	8	.429	12	–	15	.444
Cornell	3	–	11	.214	7	–	20	.259
Yale	3	–	11	.214	4	–	23	.148
Dartmouth	2	–	12	.143	8	–	19	.296
† 2025 Ivy League tournament winner

The 2024–25 Dartmouth Big Green women's basketball team represented Dartmouth College during the 2024–25 NCAA Division I women's basketball season. The Big Green, led by second-year head coach Linda Cimino, played their home games at Leede Arena in Hanover, New Hampshire as members of the Ivy League.

The Big Green finished the season 8–19, 2–12 in Ivy League play, to finish in last (eighth) place.

== Previous season ==
The Big Green finished the 2023–24 season 7–19, 1–13 in Ivy League play, to finish in a tie for last place. They failed to qualify for the Ivy League tournament, as only the top four teams qualify.

== Roster ==
2024–25 Dartmouth Big Green women's basketball team
Players
Coaches

Pos.	#	Name	Height	Year	Previous school	Hometown
G	1	Nina Minicozzi	5 ft 8 in (1.73 m)	So	Rivers School	Belmont, MA
G	2	Meena Tate	5 ft 11 in (1.8 m)	So	Iowa City West High School	Iowa City, IA
G	3	Tahira Muhammad	5 ft 8 in (1.73 m)	Fr	Noble and Greenough School	Hyde Park, MA
F	4	Cate MacDonald	6 ft 1 in (1.85 m)	So	New Hampton School	Lynnfield, MA
G	5	Ellie Cerf	5 ft 6 in (1.68 m)	Fr	Bethlehem Central High School	Delmar, NY
F	10	Olivia Lawlor	6 ft 1 in (1.85 m)	Jr	Summit High School	Summit, NJ
G	11	Alexandra Eldredge	5 ft 11 in (1.8 m)	So	Southern Utah	McLean, VA
F	12	Olivia Austin	6 ft 1 in (1.85 m)	Fr	Nazareth Academy	Western Springs, IL
G	13	Zeynep Ozel	5 ft 8 in (1.73 m)	Fr	Blair Academy	Istanbul, Turkey
F	14	Doreen Ariik	6 ft 4 in (1.93 m)	Sr	Northfield Mount Hermon School	Nairobi, Kenya
G	15	Victoria Page	5 ft 8 in (1.73 m)	Sr	Blackman High School	Murfreesboro, TN
G	20	Brooke Hollawell	5 ft 9 in (1.75 m)	Jr	Manasquan High School	Wall, NJ
F	21	Lucija Banovic	6 ft 0 in (1.83 m)	So	Lucijan Vranjanin	Zagreb, Croatia
G	22	Sierra Carson	5 ft 8 in (1.73 m)	So	Oxford Hills Comprehensive High School	Norway, ME
F	25	Clare Meyer	6 ft 3 in (1.91 m)	Jr	Germantown Friends School	Philadelphia, PA
F	32	Annika Jiwani	6 ft 0 in (1.83 m)	Fr	Troy High School	Buena Park, CA

Head coach

- Linda Cimino (Adelphi)

Assistant coach(es)

- Robert Isme (NYIT)
- Anh-Dao Tran (Adelphi)
- Alyssa Fisher (St. Francis Brooklyn)

Legend

- (C) Team captain
- (S) Suspended
- (I) Ineligible
- (W) Walk-on
- Injured
- Current redshirt

Roster
Last update: February 14, 2025

== Schedule and results ==
Date time, TV	Rank^{#}	Opponent^{#}	Result	Record	Site (attendance) city, state
Non-conference regular season
November 8, 2024*; 6:00 p.m., ESPN+		Keene State	W 98–47	1–0	Leede Arena (791); Hanover, NH
November 13, 2024*; 8:00 p.m., ESPN+		Albany	L 53–58	1–1	Leede Arena (767); Hanover, NH
November 16, 2024*; 1:00 p.m., ESPN+		UMass Lowell	W 57–41	2–1	Leede Arena (473); Hanover, NH
November 18, 2024*; 7:00 p.m., ESPN+		Vermont	L 37–61	2–2	Leede Arena (496); Hanover, NH
December 1, 2024*; 2:00 p.m., ESPN+		New Hampshire; Rivalry	L 57–64	2–3	Leede Arena (765); Hanover, NH
December 4, 2024*; 7:00 p.m., ESPN+		at Navy	W 61–58 ^{OT}	3–3	Alumni Hall (544); Annapolis, MD
December 6, 2024*; 6:00 p.m., ESPN+		at Bucknell	L 50–53	3–4	Sojka Pavilion (258); Lewisburg, PA
December 8, 2024*; 6:30 p.m., NESN/ESPN+		UMass	L 56–67	3–5	Leede Arena (603); Hanover, NH
December 10, 2024*; 7:00 p.m., NEC Front Row		at Stonehill	L 43–75	3–6	Merkert Gymnasium (117); Easton, MA
December 16, 2024*; 11:00 a.m., NEC Front Row		at Central Connecticut	W 61–59	4–6	William H. Detrick Gymnasium (204); New Britain, CT
December 18, 2024*; 6:00 p.m., ESPN+		at Lafayette	W 60–47	5–6	Kirby Sports Center (164); Easton, PA
December 21, 2024*; 11:00 a.m., ACCNX		at Syracuse	L 52–87	5–7	JMA Wireless Dome (2,772); Syracuse, NY
January 1, 2025*; 1:00 p.m., ESPN+		Colby–Sawyer	W 94–46	6–7	Leede Arena (987); Hanover, NH
Ivy League regular season
January 4, 2025; 2:00 p.m., ESPN+		at Brown	W 64–48	7–7 (1–0)	Pizzitola Sports Center (397); Providence, RI
January 11, 2025; 2:00 p.m., ESPN+		at Penn	W 61–49	8–7 (2–0)	The Palestra (482); Philadelphia, PA
January 18, 2025; 2:00 p.m., ESPN+		at Princeton	L 39–63	8–8 (2–1)	Jadwin Gymnasium (1,111); Princeton, NJ
January 20, 2025; 6:00 p.m., ESPN+		Yale	L 67–70	8–9 (2–2)	Leede Arena (584); Hanover, NH
January 25, 2025; 2:00 p.m., NESN+/ESPN+		Brown	L 56–64	8–10 (2–3)	Leede Arena (754); Hanover, NH
January 31, 2025; 6:00 p.m., ESPN+		Cornell	L 48–60	8–11 (2–4)	Leede Arena (841); Hanover, NH
February 1, 2025; 5:00 p.m., ESPN+		Columbia	L 48–71	8–12 (2–5)	Leede Arena (1,031); Hanover, NH
February 8, 2025; 4:00 p.m., ESPN+		at Harvard	L 31–66	8–13 (2–6)	Lavietes Pavilion (984); Cambridge, MA
February 14, 2025; 7:00 p.m.		at Columbia	L 37–89	8–14 (2–7)	Levien Gymnasium (1,324); New York, NY
February 15, 2025; 5:00 p.m., ESPN+		at Cornell	L 43–56	8–15 (2–8)	Newman Arena (87); Ithaca, NY
February 22, 2025; 2:00 p.m., ESPN+		at Yale	L 59–76	8–16 (2–9)	John J. Lee Amphitheater (646); New Haven, CT
February 28, 2025; 8:00 p.m., ESPN+		Penn	L 37–66	8–17 (2–10)	Leede Arena (450); Hanover, NH
March 1, 2025; 7:00 p.m., ESPN+		Princeton	L 55–67	8–18 (2–11)	Leede Arena (527); Hanover, NH
March 8, 2025; 2:00 p.m., ESPN+		Harvard	L 40–74	8–19 (2–12)	Leede Arena (894); Hanover, NH
*Non-conference game. ^{#}Rankings from AP poll. (#) Tournament seedings in parentheses. All times are in Eastern.
