= 2024–25 Villanova Wildcats women's basketball team =

Intercollegiate basketball season

2024–25 Villanova Wildcats women's basketball

WBIT, semifinals
- Conference: Big East Conference
- Record: 21–15 (11–7 Big East)
- Head coach: Denise Dillon (5th season)
- Associate head coach: Joe Mullaney
- Assistant coaches: Michelle Sword; Tiara Malcom; Jess Genco
- Home arena: Finneran Pavilion

2024–25 Big East women's basketball standings
	Conf.				Overall
Team	W		L	PCT	W		L	PCT
No. 1 UConn †	18	–	0	1.000	37	–	3	.925
No. 23 Creighton	16	–	2	.889	26	–	7	.788
Seton Hall	13	–	5	.722	23	–	10	.697
Marquette	12	–	6	.667	21	–	11	.656
Villanova	11	–	7	.611	21	–	15	.583
DePaul	8	–	10	.444	13	–	19	.406
Providence	6	–	12	.333	13	–	19	.406
St. John's	5	–	13	.278	16	–	15	.516
Butler	5	–	13	.278	16	–	18	.471
Georgetown	4	–	14	.222	12	–	19	.387
Xavier	1	–	17	.056	7	–	24	.226
† 2025 Big East tournament winner Rankings from AP poll

The 2024–25 Villanova Wildcats women's basketball team represented Villanova University in the 2024–25 NCAA Division I women's basketball season. The Wildcats, led by fifth-year head coach Denise Dillon, played their home games at the Finneran Pavilion in Villanova, Pennsylvania and were members of the Big East Conference.

== Previous season ==
The Wildcats finished the 2023–24 season at 22–13 and 11–7 in Big East play, to finish in a tie for third place. As a No. 4 seed in the Big East tournament, they lost in the quarterfinals to Marquette. They received an at-large bid to the WBIT, where they defeated VCU and Virginia in the first and second rounds, Saint Joseph's in the quarterfinals and Penn State in the semifinals before losing to Illinois in the championship game.

== Offseason ==
=== Departures ===
Name	Number	Pos.	Height	Year	Hometown	Reason for departure
Zanai Jones	1	G	5'6"	Junior	Jersey City, NJ	Transferred to SMU
Abby Jegede	2	G	5'10"	(redshirt) Freshman	Toronto, ON	Transferred to Northeastern
Lucy Olsen	3	G	5'9"	Junior	Royersford, PA	Transferred to Iowa
Christina Dalce	10	F	6'2"	Junior	Edison, NJ	Transferred to Maryland
Megan Olbrys	14	F	6'1"	Sophomore	Norwood, MA	Transferred to UMass
Kylie Swider	21	F/C	6'4"	Senior	Portsmouth, RI	Transferred to Stonehill
Bella Runyan	32	G	5'11"	Senior	Moorestown, NJ	Graduated

=== Incoming transfers ===
Name	Number	Pos.	Height	Year	Hometown	Previous school
Ryanne Allen	5	G	6'1"	Junior	Warminster, PA	Vanderbilt
Bronagh Power-Cassidy	7	G	5'10"	GS senior	Dublin, Ireland	Holy Cross
Jaliyah Green	8	G	5'10"	Senior	Wentzville, MO	Southeast Missouri State
Lara Edmanson	14	G/F	6'0"	GS senior	Melbourne, Australia	Santa Clara

==== Recruiting ====
College recruiting
Name	Hometown	School	Height	Weight	Commit date
Jasmine Bascoe; PG	Milton, ON	King's Christian Collegiate	5 ft 7 in (1.70 m)	N/A	
Jasmine Bascoe; PG	Recruit ratings: ESPN: (91)				
Overall recruit ranking:
Note: In many cases, Scout, Rivals, 247Sports, On3, and ESPN may conflict in their listings of height and weight.; In these cases, the average was taken. ESPN grades are on a 100-point scale.; Sources: "2024 Player Commits". ESPN. Archived from the original on November 22, 2024.

==== Recruiting class of 2025 ====
College recruiting (2025)
Name	Hometown	School	Height	Weight	Commit date
Kennedy Henry; G	Blairstown, NJ	Blair Academy	6 ft 0 in (1.83 m)	N/A	
Kennedy Henry; G	Recruit ratings: ESPN: (92)				
Overall recruit ranking:
Note: In many cases, Scout, Rivals, 247Sports, On3, and ESPN may conflict in their listings of height and weight.; In these cases, the average was taken. ESPN grades are on a 100-point scale.; Sources: "2025 Player Commits". ESPN. Archived from the original on November 22, 2024.

== Roster ==
2024–25 Villanova Wildcats women's basketball team
Players
Coaches

Pos.	#	Name	Height	Year	Previous school	Hometown
G	4	Kaitlyn Orihel	5 ft 10 in (1.78 m)	Sr	Archbishop Wood	Newtown, PA
G	5	Ryanne Allen	6 ft 1 in (1.85 m)	Jr	Archbishop Wood; Vanderbilt	Warminster, PA
G	7	Bronagh Power-Cassidy	5 ft 10 in (1.78 m)	GS	Marianapolis Prep; Holy Cross	Dublin, Ireland
G	8	Jaliyah Green	5 ft 10 in (1.78 m)	Sr	Holt; Southeast Missouri State	St. Louis, MO
G	11	Jasmine Bascoe	5 ft 7 in (1.7 m)	Fr	King's Christian	Milton, ON
F	13	Brynn McCurry	6 ft 1 in (1.85 m)	So	Sparta	Sparta, NJ
G/F	14	Lara Edmanson	6 ft 0 in (1.83 m)	GS	MLC; Santa Clara	Melbourne, Australia
G	23	Maddie Burke	6 ft 0 in (1.83 m)	GS	Central Bucks West	Doylestown, PA
G	24	Dani Ceseretti	6 ft 0 in (1.83 m)	Fr	Northfield Mount Hermon	Barrington, RI
F	25	Denae Carter	6 ft 0 in (1.83 m)	Jr	St. Basil Academy; Mississippi State	Philadelphia, PA
G	34	Maddie Webber	5 ft 11 in (1.8 m)	So	South Fayette	Sparta, NJ
F	43	Annie Welde	6 ft 0 in (1.83 m)	Jr	Cardinal O'Hara	Bridgeville, PA
G	44	Maggie Grant	6 ft 0 in (1.83 m)	So	Archbishop John Carroll	Downingtown, PA
F	45	Rachel Wirts	6 ft 3 in (1.91 m)	Fr	Center Grove	Greenwood, IN

Head coach

- Denise Dillon (Villanova)

Assistant coach(es)

- Joe Mullaney (Providence)
- Michelle Sword (Saint Joseph's)
- Mary Wooley (USC Aiken)
- Jess Genco (Northeastern)

Legend

- (C) Team captain
- (S) Suspended
- (I) Ineligible
- (W) Walk-on
- Injured
- Current redshirt

Roster

== Schedule and results ==
Date time, TV	Rank^{#}	Opponent^{#}	Result	Record	High points	High rebounds	High assists	Site (attendance) city, state
Non-conference regular season
November 10, 2024*; 2:00 p.m., FloHoops		Wake Forest	W 64–56	1–0	18 – Bascoe	6 – Power-Cassidy	5 – Bascoe	Finneran Pavilion (1,511); Villanova, PA
November 13, 2024*; 7:00 p.m., ESPN+		at Princeton	L 61–70	1–1	23 – Webber	5 – Carter	3 – Webber	Jadwin Gymnasium (925); Princeton, NJ
November 16, 2024*; 2:00 p.m., FloHoops		Columbia	W 68–67	2–1	17 – Burke	10 – Burke	5 – Bascoe	Finneran Pavilion (1,518); Villanova, PA
November 20, 2024*; 7:00 p.m., FloHoops		Penn; Women's Big 5 Classic Pod 2	W 80–64	3–1	17 – Burke	10 – Burke	5 – Bascoe	Finneran Pavilion (1,121); Villanova, PA
November 23, 2024*; 9:00 p.m., FloHoops		vs. Texas A&M; Battle 4 Atlantis quarterfinals	W 65–57	4–1	15 – Bascoe	11 – Carter	6 – Bascoe	Imperial Arena (381); Nassau, Bahamas
November 24, 2024*; 4:00 p.m., FloHoops		vs. No. 16 North Carolina; Battle 4 Atlantis semifinals	L 36–53	4–2	12 – Webber	7 – Edmanson	3 – Bascoe	Imperial Arena (385); Nassau, Bahamas
November 25, 2024*; 2:30 p.m., ESPNU		vs. Baylor; Battle 4 Atlantis 3rd place game	L 62–73	4–3	13 – Carter	6 – Tied	7 – Bascoe	Imperial Arena (158); Nassau, Bahamas
December 1, 2024*; 2:00 p.m., ESPN+		at Saint Joseph's; Women's Big 5 Classic Pod 2	W 81–65	5–3	26 – Boscoe	6 – Carter	4 – Tied	Hagan Arena (1,783); Philadelphia, PA
December 6, 2024*; 8:00 p.m., NBCSPHI+		Temple; Women's Big 5 Classic championship	L 62–76	5–4	19 – Bascoe	7 – Bascoe	6 – Tied	Finneran Pavilion (1,526); Villanova, PA
December 8, 2024*; 2:00 p.m., ESPN+		at Fairfield	L 71–74	5–5	16 – Carter	8 – Carter	4 – Boscoe	Leo D. Mahoney Arena (1,644); Fairfield, CT
December 11, 2024*; 6:30 p.m., FloHoops		at Delaware	W 75–65	6–5	16 – Webber	6 – Tied	5 – Edmanson	Bob Carpenter Center (1,157); Newark, DE
December 15, 2024*; 2:00 p.m., FloHoops		James Madison	L 67–71	6–6	16 – Webber	6 – Bascoe	4 – Bascoe	Finneran Pavilion (1,501); Villanova, PA
Big East regular season
December 21, 2024; 2:00 p.m., FloHoops		St. John's	W 71–57	7–6 (1–0)	24 – Bascoe	7 – Carter	5 – Carter	Finneran Pavilion (1,113); Villanova, PA
January 1, 2025; 8:30 p.m., FS1		Seton Hall	L 55–56	7–7 (1–1)	17 – Power-Cassidy	8 – Carter	5 – Bascoe	Finneran Pavilion (435); Villanova, PA
January 5, 2025; 1:30 p.m., SNY		No. 7 UConn	L 52–83	7–8 (1–2)	12 – Bascoe	7 – Carter	3 – Bascoe	Finneran Pavilion (6,501); Villanova, PA
January 8, 2025; 7:00 p.m., FloHoops		at Georgetown	W 77–62	8–8 (2–2)	19 – Webber	7 – Carter	5 – Power-Cassidy	McDonough Arena (219); Washington, D.C.
January 11, 2025; 3:00 p.m., FloHoops		at Marquette	L 59–64	8–9 (2–3)	16 – Webber	6 – Tied	4 – Green	Al McGuire Center (3,012); Milwaukee, WI
January 15, 2025; 11:30 a.m., FloHoops		DePaul	W 66–55	9–9 (3–3)	18 – Tied	6 – Webber	3 – Webber	Finneran Pavilion (1,219); Villanova, PA
January 18, 2025; 2:00 p.m., FloHoops		at St. John's	W 66–64	10–9 (4–3)	17 – Webber	10 – Allen	8 – Bascoe	Carnesecca Arena (717); Queen, NY
January 22, 2025; 7:00 p.m., SNY		at No. 6 UConn	L 57–100	10–10 (4–4)	15 – Bascoe	7 – Burke	4 – Bascoe	Harry A. Gampel Pavilion (10,299); Storrs, CT
January 25, 2025; 2:00 p.m., FloHoops		Xavier	W 67–52	11–10 (5–4)	25 – Bascoe	13 – Carter	7 – Bascoe	Finneran Pavilion (2,133); Villanova, PA
February 2, 2025; 2:00 p.m., FloHoops		Marquette	W 65–53	12–10 (6–4)	17 – Bascoe	6 – Carter	6 – Bascoe	Finneran Pavilion (2,335); Villanova, PA
February 5, 2025; 7:00 p.m., FloSports		at Butler	W 63–59	13–10 (7–4)	19 – Webber	6 – Tied	5 – Bascoe	Hinkle Fieldhouse (987); Indianapolis, IN
February 8, 2025; 2:00 p.m., FloHoops		Creighton	L 57–70	13–11 (7–5)	21 – Bascoe	8 – Carter	4 – Tied	Finneran Pavilion (1,951); Villanova, PA
February 12, 2025; 8:00 p.m., FloHoops		at DePaul	W 62–56	14–11 (8–5)	30 – Webber	13 – Carter	5 – Tied	Wintrust Arena (1,209); Chicago, IL
February 16, 2025; 2:00 p.m., FloHoops		at Xavier	W 57–42	15–11 (9–5)	15 – Tied	9 – Carter	5 – Bascoe	Cintas Center (1,676); Cincinnati, OH
February 19, 2025; 7:00 p.m., FloHoops		Georgetown	W 70–65	16–11 (10–5)	26 – Bascoe	6 – Carter	3 – Tied	Finneran Pavilion (1,049); Villanova, PA
February 23, 2025; 12:00 p.m., FS1		at Providence	L 56–63	16–12 (10–6)	17 – Webber	5 – Carter	3 – Tied	Alumni Hall (1,051); Providence, RI
February 26, 2025; 6:00 p.m., FloSports		Butler	W 56–54	17–12 (11–6)	15 – Bascoe	4 – Tied	2 – Tied	Finneran Pavilion (1,509); Villanova, PA
March 2, 2025; 8:30 p.m., FS1		at No. 22 Creighton	L 55–70	17–13 (11–7)	27 – Bascoe	9 – Bascoe	2 – Tied	D. J. Sokol Arena (1,722); Omaha, NE
Big East women's tournament
March 8, 2025*; 2:30 p.m., FS2	(5)	vs. (4) Marquette; Quarterfinals	W 73–66	18–13	22 – Bascoe	10 – Bascoe	5 – Webber	Mohegan Sun Arena (8,816); Uncasville, CT
March 9, 2025*; 2:30 p.m., FOX	(5)	vs. (1) No. 3 UConn; Semifinals	L 54–82	18–14	15 – Webber	5 – Tied	1 – Tied	Mohegan Sun Arena; Uncasville, CT
WBIT
March 20, 2025*; 7:00 p.m., ESPN+	(4)	Boston College; First round	W 76–70	19–14	24 – Bascoe	6 – Tied	4 – Bascoe	Finneran Pavilion (755); Villanova, PA
March 23, 2025*; 2:00 p.m., ESPN+	(4)	at (1) Saint Joesph's; Second round	W 62–60	20–14	15 – Bascoe	7 – Green	5 – Bascoe	Hagan Arena (1,578); Philadelphia, PA
March 27, 2025*; 7:00 p.m., ESPN+	(4)	Portland; Quarterfinals	W 71–61	21–14	20 – Bascoe	7 – Carter	8 – Bascoe	Finneran Pavilion (1,153); Villanova, PA
March 31, 2025*; 2:30 p.m., ESPNU	(4)	vs. (3) Belmont; Semifinals	L 57–66	21–15	18 – Webber	8 – Carter	5 – Bascoe	Hinkle Fieldhouse; Indianapolis, IN
*Non-conference game. ^{#}Rankings from AP poll. (#) Tournament seedings in parentheses. All times are in Eastern.

== Rankings ==
Ranking movements
	Week																				
Poll	Pre	1	2	3	4	5	6	7	8	9	10	11	12	13	14	15	16	17	18	19	Final
AP																					Not released
Coaches																					

== See also ==
- 2024–25 Villanova Wildcats men's basketball team
