= Carrie Moore (basketball) =

American basketball coach

- Moore with Harvard in 2026

Current position
- Title: Head coach
- Team: Harvard
- Conference: Ivy League
- Record: 80–41 (.661)

Biographical details
- Born: May 15, 1985 (age 41); Lathrup Village, Michigan, U.S.

Playing career
- 2003–2007: Western Michigan
- 2007–2008: AZS AJP Gorzów Wielkopolski

Coaching career (HC unless noted)
- 2010–2015: Creighton (asst.)
- 2016–2019: Princeton (asst.)
- 2019–2021: North Carolina (asst.)
- 2021–2022: Michigan (asst.)
- 2022–present: Harvard

Head coaching record
- Overall: 80–41 (.661)

Accomplishments and honors

Championships
- Ivy League tournament championship (2025)

Awards
- MAC Player of the Year (2007); NCAA season scoring leader (2007)

Carrie Moore (born May 15, 1985) is an American former basketball player and current head coach for Harvard.

== Playing career ==
Moore played college basketball at Western Michigan where she finished her career as the program's all-time leading scorer with 2,224 points in 120 games. During her senior year in 2006–07, she was the NCAA scoring leader with 813 points, averaging 25.4 points per game. She became the only MAC player to ever lead the NCAA in scoring. When she scored 34 points in a post-season tournament game against Miami, she became the conference's record holder for points in a single season. During her senior year she set nine school records, including points (2,224), field goals made (759) and free throws made (541). Following an outstanding season, she was named Mid-American Conference's Co-Player of the Year.

Following her collegiate career at Western Michigan, she signed with the Phoenix Mercury to a training camp contract after the 2007 WNBA Pre-Draft Camp. She played in two pre-season games, averaging 8.5 points and 2.0 assists. She then played one year with AZS AJP Gorzów Wielkopolski in the Basket Liga Kobiet in Poland during the 2007–08 season. On April 4, 2008, she signed with the Chicago Sky to a training camp contract.

== Career statistics ==
Legend
GP	Games played	GS	Games started	MPG	Minutes per game	FG%	Field goal percentage	3P%	3-point field goal percentage
FT%	Free throw percentage	RPG	Rebounds per game	APG	Assists per game	SPG	Steals per game	BPG	Blocks per game
TO	Turnovers per game	PPG	Points per game	**Bold**	Career high	*	Led Division I

Year	Team	GP	Points	FG%	3P%	FT%	RPG	APG	SPG	BPG	PPG
2003–04	Western Michigan	32	438	41.1%	35.6%	78.5%	5.5	2.5	1.3	0.4	13.7
2004–05	Western Michigan	28	492	41.7%	33.3%	70.1%	**8.2**	**3.8**	1.7	0.5	17.6
2005–06	Western Michigan	**33**	481	**49.9%**	**33.8%**	72.1%	7.4	3.4	1.5	0.2	17.2
2006–07	Western Michigan	32	**813**	45.3%	31.7%	**79.2%**	7.0	3.0	**1.9**	**0.5**	***25.4**
Career		120	2,224	44.6%	33.5%	75.7%	7.0	3.1	1.6	0.4	18.5

== Coaching career ==
On December 1, 2008, Moore was named Director of Basketball Operations for Princeton. During her two seasons from 2008 to 2010, she helped lead Princeton to their first NCAA Tournament appearance in 2010, as the Tigers finished the season with a record of 26–3, including 14–0 in Ivy League play.

=== Creighton ===
Moore served as an assistant coach for Creighton from 2010 to 2015. In 2012, she helped Creighton advance to the NCAA Tournament for the first time since 2002. In 2014, she helped Marissa Janning become Creighton's first All-American since 1998.

=== Princeton ===
On April 18, 2016, Moore was named an assistant coach for Princeton. During her time at Princeton, they won consecutive Ivy League regular season and tournament championships in 2018 and 2019.

=== North Carolina ===
On May 14, 2019, Moore was named an assistant coach and recruiting coordinator for North Carolina. This reunited her with former Princeton head coach Courtney Banghart. In her first year, her 2019 recruiting class was ranked No. 10 by ESPNW. In her second year, her 2020 recruiting class was ranked third nationally. Three of those players were named McDonald's All-Americans, making UNC one of just four schools nationally with three or more honorees.

=== Michigan ===
On May 7, 2021, Moore was named an assistant coach and recruiting coordinator for Michigan.

=== Harvard ===
On April 5, 2022, Moore was named the head coach for Harvard, following the retirement of longtime head coach Kathy Delaney-Smith. During the 2024–25 season, she helped lead Harvard to its first-ever Ivy League women's basketball tournament championship in 2025, and their first NCAA tournament appearance since 2007.

== Head coaching record ==
Record table
Season	Team	Overall	Conference	Standing	Postseason
Harvard Crimson (Ivy League) (2022–present)
2022–23	Harvard	20–12	9–5	T-2nd	WNIT Great Eight
2023–24	Harvard	16–12	9–5	3rd	
2024–25	Harvard	24–5	11–3	3rd	NCAA First Round
2023–24	Harvard	20–12	10–4	3rd	WBIT Quarterfinals
Harvard:		80–41 (.661)	39–17 (.696)		
Total:		80–41 (.661)			
National champion Postseason invitational champion Conference regular season champion Conference regular season and conference tournament champion Division regular season champion Division regular season and conference tournament champion Conference tournament champion
