= Emily Garner =

American basketball player and coach

Current position
- Title: Head coach
- Team: Cornell
- Conference: Ivy League
- Record: 16–38 (.296)

Biographical details
- Education: Lafayette College (B.A., 2009); Long Island University (M.A., 2012)

Playing career
- 2005–2009: Lafayette

Coaching career (HC unless noted)
- 2010–2012: LIU Brooklyn (ga)
- 2012–2016: Army (assistant)
- 2016–2024: Trinity (CT)
- 2024–present: Cornell

Head coaching record
- Overall: 140–93 (.601)

Emily Garner is an American basketball player and coach and is the current head coach of the Cornell Big Red women's basketball team.

== Coaching career ==
Garner started her coaching career as a graduate assistant for the LIU Brooklyn Blackbirds, before graduating with a Master of Arts from Long Island University in 2012.

In 2016, Garner was named head coach at Trinity College, in Hartford, Connecticut where she would lead the Bantams to a 124–55 record over the course of eight seasons. While at Trinity, she led the team to two NCAA Division III women's basketball tournaments, in 2023 and 2024, including its first win since 1995.

On April 11, 2024, Garner was named the eighth head coach in Cornell women's basketball history.

== Head coaching record ==
Record table
Season	Team	Overall	Conference	Standing	Postseason
Trinity Bantams (NESCAC) (2016–2024)
2016–17	Trinity	13–10	3–7		
2017–18	Trinity	15–10	3–7		
2018–19	Trinity	19–6	6–4		
2019–20	Trinity	16–9	5–5		
2020–21	Trinity	0–0	0–0		Season cancelled due to the COVID-19 pandemic.
2021–22	Trinity	17–6	8–2		
2022–23	Trinity	25–6	7–3		NCAA DIII Sectional Finals
2023–24	Trinity	19–8	8–2		NCAA DIII First Round
Trinity:		124–55 (.693)	40–30 (.571)		
Cornell Big Red (Ivy League) (2024–present)
2024–25	Cornell	7–20	3–11	T–6th	
2025–26	Cornell	9–18	4–10	6th	
Cornell:		16–38 (.296)	7–21 (.250)		
Total:		140–93 (.601)			
National champion Postseason invitational champion Conference regular season champion Conference regular season and conference tournament champion Division regular season champion Division regular season and conference tournament champion Conference tournament champion
