= 2024–25 Harvard Crimson women's basketball team =

American college basketball season

2024–25 Harvard Crimson women's basketball

Ivy League tournament champions

NCAA tournament, First Round
- Conference: Ivy League
- Record: 24–5 (11–3 Ivy)
- Head coach: Carrie Moore (3rd season)
- Assistant coaches: Ali Sanders; Steve Harney; Ariel Gaston
- Home arena: Lavietes Pavilion

2024–25 Ivy League women's basketball standings
	Conf.				Overall
Team	W		L	PCT	W		L	PCT
Columbia	13	–	1	.929	24	–	7	.774
Princeton	12	–	2	.857	21	–	8	.724
Harvard †	11	–	3	.786	24	–	5	.828
Penn	6	–	8	.429	15	–	13	.536
Brown	6	–	8	.429	12	–	15	.444
Cornell	3	–	11	.214	7	–	20	.259
Yale	3	–	11	.214	4	–	23	.148
Dartmouth	2	–	12	.143	8	–	19	.296
† 2025 Ivy League tournament winner

The 2024–25 Harvard Crimson women's basketball team represented Harvard University during the 2024–25 NCAA Division I women's basketball season. The Crimson, led by third-year head coach Carrie Moore, played their home games at the Lavietes Pavilion in Cambridge, Massachusetts as members of the Ivy League.

== Previous season ==
The Crimson finished the 2023–24 season 16–12, 9–5 in Ivy League play, to finish in third place. In the Ivy League tournament, they lost in the semifinals to Columbia.

== Roster ==
2024–25 Harvard Crimson women's basketball team
Players
Coaches

Pos.	#	Name	Height	Year	Previous school	Hometown
F	3	Asani Ceaser	6 ft 0 in (1.83 m)	Fr	Centennial High School	Las Vegas, NV
F	4	Mona Zarić	6 ft 2 in (1.88 m)	Sr	Kykkos B'Lyceum	Novi Sad, Serbia
G	5	Gabby Anderson	5 ft 11 in (1.8 m)	Jr	IMG Academy	Columbus, OH
G	6	Lydia Chatira	6 ft 0 in (1.83 m)	Fr	ACS Athens	Pikermi, Greece
G	10	Elena Rodriguez	6 ft 2 in (1.88 m)	Sr	IES Joaquin Artiles	Agüimes, Spain
G	11	Alayna Rocco	5 ft 10 in (1.78 m)	Fr	North Catholic High School	Pittsburgh, PA
G	12	Karlee White	5 ft 9 in (1.75 m)	So	Oak Park High School	Burbank, CA
F	13	Hana Belibi	5 ft 0 in (1.52 m)	Fr	Regis Jesuit High School	Englewood, CO
G	14	Harmoni Turner	5 ft 10 in (1.78 m)	Sr	Mansfield Legacy High School	Mansfield, TX
G	22	Saniyah Glenn-Bello	6 ft 0 in (1.83 m)	Jr	Christ the King High School	Staten Island, NY
G	23	Nina Emnace	5 ft 7 in (1.7 m)	Fr	Trinity Hall	Toms River, NJ
F	24	Mary Hollensteiner	6 ft 1 in (1.85 m)	So	Stone Ridge School of the Sacred Heart	Bethesda, MD
F	31	Katie Krupa	6 ft 1 in (1.85 m)	Jr	Morton High School	Morton, IL
G/F	40	Abigail Wright	6 ft 1 in (1.85 m)	So	Newton North High School	Newton, MA

Head coach

- Carrie Moore (Western Michigan)

Assistant coach(es)

- Ali Sanders (Southeastern)
- Steve Harney (Dickinson)
- Ariel Gaston (New Hampshire)

Legend

- (C) Team captain
- (S) Suspended
- (I) Ineligible
- (W) Walk-on
- Injured
- Current redshirt

Roster

== Schedule and results ==
Date time, TV	Rank^{#}	Opponent^{#}	Result	Record	Site (attendance) city, state
Non-conference regular season
November 4, 2024*; 8:00 p.m., ESPN+		UMass	W 71–58	1–0	Lavietes Pavilion (752); Cambridge, MA
November 7, 2024*; 7:00 p.m., B1G+		at No. 25 Indiana	W 72–68 ^{OT}	2–0	Simon Skjodt Assembly Hall (10,287); Bloomington, IN
November 10, 2024*; 2:00 p.m., ESPN+		at Quinnipiac	L 53–76	2–1	M&T Bank Arena (637); Hamden, CT
November 14, 2024*; 7:00 p.m., ESPN+		Boston College	W 78–70	3–1	Lavietes Pavilion (694); Cambridge, MA
November 17, 2024*; 12:00 p.m., ESPN+		at Maine	W 83–41	4–1	Memorial Gymnasium (1,144); Orono, ME
November 19, 2024*; 7:00 p.m., ESPN+		Northeastern	W 89–37	5–1	Lavietes Pavilion (514); Cambridge, MA
November 23, 2024*; 12:00 p.m., B1G+		at Northwestern	W 75–50	6–1	Welsh–Ryan Arena (926); Evanston, IL
November 24, 2024*; 2:00 p.m., ESPN+		at Illinois State	W 72–62	7–1	CEFCU Arena (926); Normal, IL
November 27, 2024*; 12:00 p.m., FloHoops		at Stony Brook	W 60–51	8–1	Stony Brook Arena (713); Stony Brook, NY
November 28, 2024*; 12:00 p.m., FloHoops		at St. John's	W 54–52	9–1	Carnesecca Arena (269); Queens, NY
December 4, 2024*; 2:00 p.m., ESPN+		Rhode Island	W 60–48	10–1	Lavietes Pavilion (687); Cambridge, MA
December 21, 2024*; 12:00 p.m., ESPN+		Boston University	W 86–26	11–1	Lavietes Pavilion (743); Cambridge, MA
December 30, 2024*; 1:00 p.m., ESPN+		Delaware	Cancelled		Lavietes Pavilion; Cambridge, MA
Ivy League regular season
January 4, 2025; 2:00 p.m., ESPN+		at Yale	W 61–43	12–1 (1–0)	John J. Lee Amphitheater (564); New Haven, CT
January 11, 2025; 2:00 p.m., ESPN+		at Princeton	L 50–52	12–2 (1–1)	Jadwin Gymnasium (1,961); Princeton, NJ
January 18, 2025; 2:00 p.m., ESPN+		Brown	W 83–53	13–2 (2–1)	Lavietes Pavilion (807); Cambridge, MA
January 20, 2025; 2:00 p.m., ESPN+		at Penn	W 73–44	14–2 (3–1)	Palestra (458); Philadelphia, PA
January 25, 2025; 2:00 p.m., ESPN+		Yale	W 91–35	15–2 (4–1)	Lavietes Pavilion (890); Cambridge, MA
January 31, 2025; 7:00 p.m., ESPNU		Columbia	L 71–80	15–3 (4–2)	Lavietes Pavilion (1,251); Cambridge, MA
February 1, 2025; 5:00 p.m., ESPN+		Cornell	W 72–60	16–3 (5–2)	Lavietes Pavilion (869); Cambridge, MA
February 8, 2025; 4:00 p.m., ESPN+		Dartmouth	W 66–31	17–3 (6–2)	Lavietes Pavilion (984); Cambridge, MA
February 14, 2025; 6:00 p.m., ESPN+		at Cornell	W 66–29	18–3 (7–2)	Newman Arena (67); Ithaca, NY
February 16, 2025; 12:00 p.m., ESPNU		at Columbia	W 60–54	19–3 (8–2)	Levien Gymnasium (2,267); New York, NY
February 22, 2025; 2:00 p.m., ESPN+		at Brown	W 60–57	20–3 (9–2)	Pizzitola Sports Center (450); Providence, RI
February 28, 2025; 8:00 p.m., ESPN+		Princeton	L 58–70	20–4 (9–3)	Lavietes Pavilion (1,636); Cambridge, MA
March 1, 2025; 7:00 p.m., ESPN+		Penn	W 62–44	21–4 (10–3)	Lavietes Pavilion (929); Cambridge, MA
March 8, 2025; 2:00 p.m., ESPN+		at Dartmouth	W 74–40	22–4 (11–3)	Leede Arena (894); Hanover, NH
Ivy League tournament
March 14, 2025; 7:30 p.m., ESPN+	(3)	vs. (2) Princeton; Semifinals	W 70–67	23–4	Pizzitola Sports Center (458); Providence, RI
March 15, 2025; 5:30 p.m., ESPNU	(3)	vs. (1) Columbia; Championship	W 74–71	24–4	Pizzitola Sports Center; Providence, RI
NCAA tournament
March 22, 2025*; 4:30 p.m., ESPNews	(10 S1)	vs. (7 S1) Michigan State; First Round	L 50–64	24–5	Reynolds Center (4,871); Raleigh, NC
*Non-conference game. ^{#}Rankings from AP poll. (#) Tournament seedings in parentheses. All times are in Eastern.
