= 2024–25 Columbia Lions women's basketball team =

Intercollegiate basketball season

2024–25 Columbia Lions women's basketball

Ivy League regular season champions

NCAA tournament, First Round
- Conference: Ivy League
- Record: 24–7 (13–1 Ivy)
- Head coach: Megan Griffith (9th season)
- Assistant coaches: Tyler Cordell; Allie Bassetti; Cy Lippold
- Home arena: Levien Gymnasium

2024–25 Ivy League women's basketball standings
	Conf.				Overall
Team	W		L	PCT	W		L	PCT
Columbia	13	–	1	.929	24	–	7	.774
Princeton	12	–	2	.857	21	–	8	.724
Harvard †	11	–	3	.786	24	–	5	.828
Penn	6	–	8	.429	15	–	13	.536
Brown	6	–	8	.429	12	–	15	.444
Cornell	3	–	11	.214	7	–	20	.259
Yale	3	–	11	.214	4	–	23	.148
Dartmouth	2	–	12	.143	8	–	19	.296
† 2025 Ivy League tournament winner

The 2024–25 Columbia Lions women's basketball team represented Columbia University during the 2024–25 NCAA Division I women's basketball season. The Lions, led by ninth-year head coach Megan Griffith, played their home games at Levien Gymnasium in New York City as members of the Ivy League.

== Previous season ==
The Lions finished the 2023–24 season 23–7, 13–1 in Ivy League play, winning a share of the Ivy League title with Princeton. They defeated Harvard in the 2024 Ivy League women's basketball tournament semifinals before losing to Princeton in the championship game. They received an at-large bid to the NCAA women's tournament for the first time in school history. As a No. 12 seed in the Portland Regional 3, they lost in the First Four to Vanderbilt.

== Roster ==
2024–25 Columbia Lions women's basketball team
Players
Coaches

Pos.	#	Name	Height	Year	Previous school	Hometown
F	0	Susie Rafiu	6 ft 1 in (1.85 m)	Jr	Copleston	Ipswich, England
G/F	1	Perri Page	5 ft 11 in (1.8 m)	Jr	Chartiers Valley	Pittsburgh, PA
G	3	Cecelia Collins	6 ft 0 in (1.83 m)	Sr	Scranton Prep; Bucknell	Scranton, PA
G	5	Mia Broom	5 ft 9 in (1.75 m)	Fr	Lakeside	Seattle, WA
G	10	Kitty Henderson (C)	5 ft 10 in (1.78 m)	Sr	St Luke's Grammar School	North Curl Curl, Australia
G	11	Nasi Simmons	5 ft 9 in (1.75 m)	Fr	Noble and Greenough	Brockton, MA
G	12	Marija Avlijas	5 ft 10 in (1.78 m)	So	ŽKK Art Basket; Ole Miss	Belgrade, Serbia
G/F	15	María Arrebola	6 ft 0 in (1.83 m)	Fr	IES Emilio Prados	Almería, Spain
F/C	21	Marta Jaama	6 ft 2 in (1.88 m)	Fr	Tallinn Arte Gymnasium	Tallinn, Estonia
G	24	Riley Weiss	5 ft 10 in (1.78 m)	So	GW Hewlett (NY); North Broward Prep (FL)	Hewlett, NY
G	30	Emily Montes	5 ft 10 in (1.78 m)	So	Palmer Trinity	Miami, FL
G/F	42	Blau Tor	6 ft 0 in (1.83 m)	Fr	INS Joaquim Blume	Barcelona, Spain

Head coach

- Megan Griffith (Columbia)

Assistant coach(es)

- Tyler Cordell (Ohio Wesleyan)
- Allie Bassetti (Rowan)
- Cy Lippold (Dartmouth)

Legend

- (C) Team captain
- (S) Suspended
- (I) Ineligible
- (W) Walk-on
- Injured
- Current redshirt

Roster
Last update: February 23, 2025

== Schedule and results ==
Date time, TV	Rank^{#}	Opponent^{#}	Result	Record	Site (attendance) city, state
Non-conference regular season
November 4, 2024*; 7:00 p.m., SNY/ESPN+		Stony Brook	W 87–47	1–0	Levien Gymnasium (847); New York, NY
November 8, 2024*; 7:00 p.m., FloHoops		at Providence	W 77–69 ^{OT}	2–0	Alumni Hall (926); Providence, RI
November 11, 2024*; 7:00 p.m., ESPN+		Florida Gulf Coast	W 72–61	3–0	Levien Gymnasium (762); New York, NY
November 16, 2024*; 2:00 p.m., FloHoops		at Villanova	L 67–68	3–1	Finneran Pavilion (1,518); Villanova, PA
November 20, 2024*; 7:00 p.m., ESPN+		Pacific	W 84–50	4–1	Levien Gymnasium (742); New York, NY
November 23, 2024*; 4:00 p.m., FloHoops		vs. Indiana; Battle 4 Atlantis quarterfinals	L 62–72	4–2	Imperial Arena (299); Paradise Island, Bahamas
November 24, 2024*; 6:30 p.m., FloHoops		vs. Southern Miss; Battle 4 Atlantis consolation 2nd round	W 85–66	5–2	Imperial Arena (313); Paradise Island, Bahamas
November 25, 2024*; 5:00 p.m., FloHoops		vs. Ball State; Battle 4 Atlantis 5th-place game	W 69–63	6–2	Imperial Arena (131); Paradise Island, Bahamas
December 1, 2024*; 12:00 p.m., ACCN		at No. 13 Duke	L 61–77	6–3	Cameron Indoor Stadium (2,228); Durham, NC
December 4, 2024*; 11:00 a.m., ESPN+		San Francisco	W 81–79	7–3	Levien Gymnasium (2,733); New York, NY
December 8, 2024*; 2:00 p.m., ESPN+		vs. Richmond	L 76–85	7–4	Henrico Sports & Events Center (814); Henrico, VA
December 21, 2024*; 12:00 p.m., NEC Front Row		at Wagner	W 77–53	8–4	Spiro Sports Center (323); Staten Island, NY
December 29, 2024*; 1:00 p.m., FloHoops		at Towson	W 73–53	9–4	TU Arena (475); Towson, MD
Ivy League regular season
January 4, 2025; 2:00 p.m., ESPN+		at Penn	W 74–59	10–4 (1–0)	Palestra (732); Philadelphia, PA
January 11, 2025; 1:00 p.m., ESPN+		at Cornell	W 69–44	11–4 (2–0)	Newman Arena (340); Ithaca, NY
January 18, 2025; 1:00 p.m., ESPN+		at Yale	W 84–64	12–4 (3–0)	John J. Lee Amphitheater (606); New Haven, CT
January 20, 2025; 7:00 p.m., SNY/ESPN+		Princeton	W 58–50	13–4 (4–0)	Levien Gymnasium (2,217); New York, NY
January 25, 2025; 2:00 p.m., ESPN+		Penn	W 79–54	14–4 (5–0)	Levien Gymnasium (1,604); New York, NY
January 31, 2025; 7:00 p.m., ESPNU		at Harvard	W 80–71	15–4 (6–0)	Lavietes Pavilion (1,251); Cambridge, MA
February 1, 2025; 5:00 p.m., ESPN+		at Dartmouth	W 71–48	16–4 (7–0)	Leede Arena (1,031); Hanover, NH
February 8, 2025; 2:00 p.m., ESPN+		at Brown	W 78–40	17–4 (8–0)	Pizzitola Sports Center (493); Providence, RI
February 14, 2025; 7:00 p.m., ESPN+		Dartmouth	W 89–37	18–4 (9–0)	Levien Gymnasium (1,394); New York, NY
February 16, 2025; 12:00 p.m., ESPNU		Harvard	L 54–60	18–5 (9–1)	Levien Gymnasium (2,267); New York, NY
February 22, 2025; 5:30 p.m., ESPN+		at Princeton	W 64–60	19–5 (10–1)	Jadwin Gymnasium (2,431); Princeton, NJ
February 28, 2025; 7:00 p.m., ESPN+		Brown	W 70–44	20–5 (11–1)	Levien Gymnasium (1,368); New York, NY
March 1, 2025; 2:00 p.m., ESPN+		Yale	W 77–49	21–5 (12–1)	Levien Gymnasium (1,427); New York, NY
March 8, 2025; 2:00 p.m., ESPN+		Cornell	W 91–58	22–5 (13–1)	Levien Gymnasium (2,307); New York, NY
Ivy League tournament
March 14, 2025; 4:30 p.m., ESPN+	(1)	vs. (4) Penn; Semifinals	W 60–54	23–5	Pizzitola Sports Center (1,114); Providence, RI
March 15, 2025; 5:30 p.m., ESPNU	(1)	vs. (3) Harvard; Championship	L 71–74	23–6	Pizzitola Sports Center; Providence, RI
NCAA tournament
March 20, 2025*; 7:00 p.m., ESPN2	(11 B2)	vs. (11 B2) Washington; First Four	W 63–60	24–6	Carmichael Arena (492); Chapel Hill, NC
March 22, 2025*; 2:00 p.m., ESPNews	(11 B2)	vs. (6 B2) West Virginia; First round	L 59–78	24–7	Carmichael Arena; Chapel Hill, NC
*Non-conference game. ^{#}Rankings from AP poll. (#) Tournament seedings in parentheses. Birmingham 2=B2. All times are in Eastern.

== See also ==
- 2024–25 Columbia Lions men's basketball team
