= Shyanne Sellers =

American basketball player (born 2003)

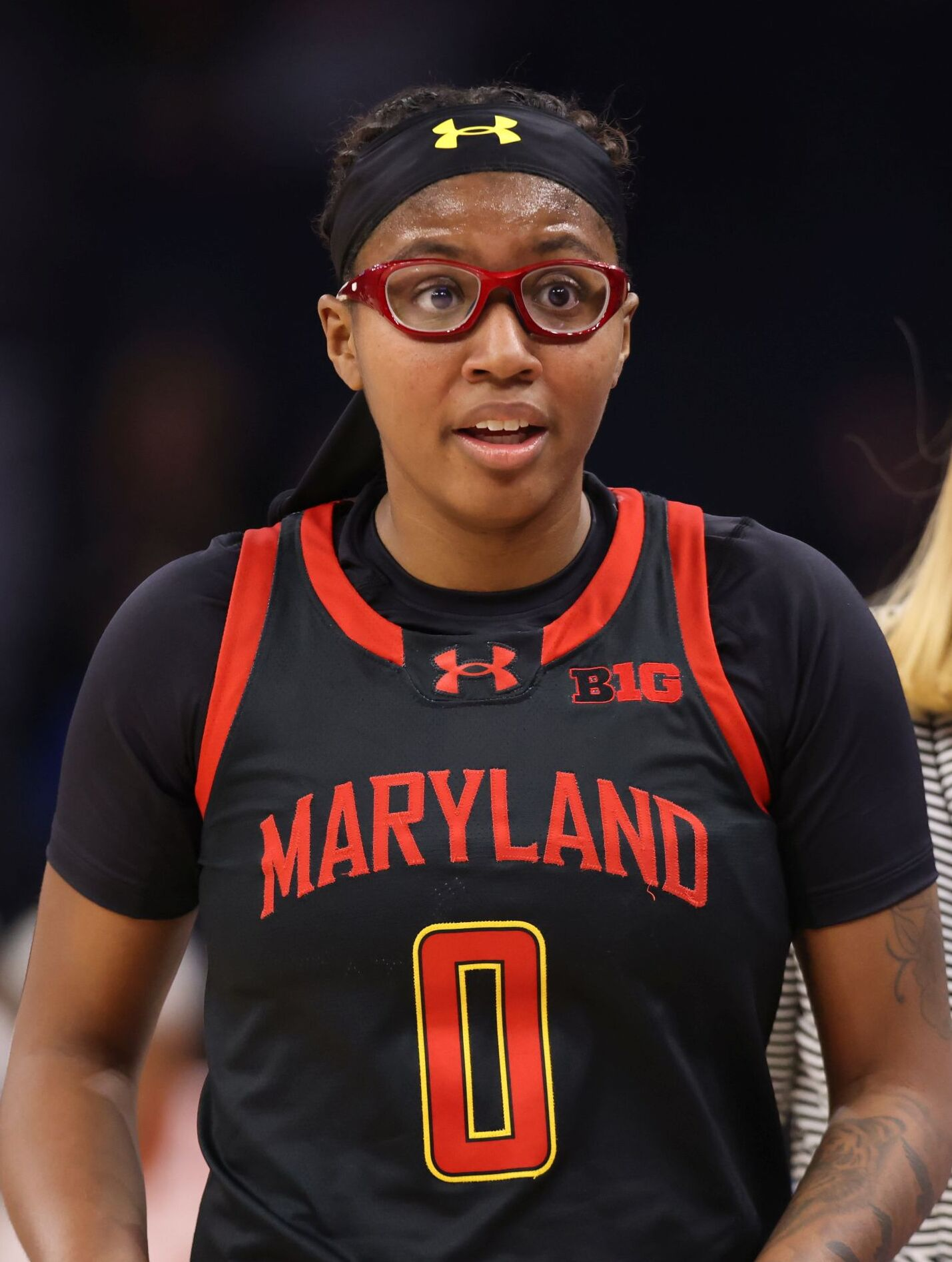
- Sellers with Maryland in 2024

Los Angeles Sparks
- Position: Guard
- League: Women's National Basketball Association

Personal information
- Born: April 24, 2003 (age 23) Aurora, Ohio, U.S.
- Listed height: 6 ft 2 in (1.88 m)

Career information
- High school: Aurora (Aurora, Ohio)
- College: Maryland (2021–2025)
- WNBA draft: 2025: 2nd round, 17th overall pick
- Drafted by: Golden State Valkyries
- Playing career: 2025–present

Career history
- 2025–2026: Maccabi Haifa
- 2026: Jacksonville Waves
- 2026-present: Los Angeles Sparks

Career highlights
- 3× First-team All-Big Ten (2023–2025); Big Ten All-Freshman Team (2022); All-Big Ten Defensive Team (2023); Big Ten Sixth Player of the Year (2022)
- Stats at Basketball Reference

Shyanne Sellers (born April 24, 2003) is an American professional basketball player for the Los Angeles Sparks in the Women's National Basketball Association. She also played for the Maccabi Haifa of the Israeli Women's Basketball Premier League from 2025 until 2026 and the Jacksonville Waves of the UpShot League in 2026. She was drafted 17th overall by the Golden State Valkyries in the 2025 WNBA draft. She played college basketball at Maryland.

== High school career ==
Sellers attended Aurora High School in Aurora, Ohio, where she led her team to four consecutive Suburban League American Division championship. During her sophomore year she averaged 23.6 points, 9.6 rebounds, 3.2 assists, 2.4 steals and 1.3 blocks per game. Following the season she earned first team all-district and first team all-state honors and was named the Suburban League American Conference Player of the Year. During her junior year she averaged 20.8 points, 11 rebounds, 5.1 assists and 2.2 steals per game and was again named the Suburban League American Conference Player of the Year. During her senior year she averaged 23.2 points, 13.2 rebounds, 4.7 assists and 1.8 blocks per game in 12 games, in a season that was shortened due to the COVID-19 pandemic.

=== Recruiting ===
Sellers was considered a four-star recruit and the No. 22 overall player in the 2021 class by ESPN. She received offers from over 20 colleges. In August 2019, she named her top nine schools she was considering, including, Maryland, Michigan State, Indiana, Florida State, Pittsburgh, Notre Dame, Louisville, UCLA and Purdue Fort Wayne. On April 6, 2020, Sellers verbally committed to play college basketball at Maryland.

== College career ==
=== Freshman season ===
During her freshman season, she averaged 7.7 points, 3.8 rebounds, 2.6 assists and 1.8 steals in 26.5 minutes per game. She appeared in all 32 games with ten starts, and led the team with 56 steals. On November 9, 2021, she made her collegiate debut against Longwood, and scored 17 points off the bench. She made her first career start on November 21, 2021, against Baylor, and scored seven points and three assists. Following the season she was named Big Ten Sixth Player of the Year as top reserve, and named to the All-Big Ten freshman team.

=== Sophomore season ===
During her sophomore season, she averaged 13.9 points, 4.8 rebounds, 3.9 assists, and 1.8 steals per game. She scored in double figures in 28 of 35 games. On January 22, 2023, against Nebraska, she scored 21 points and 11 rebounds for her first double-double of the season. On February 2, 2023, against Iowa she scored a then career-high 26 points. Following the season she earned first-team all-Big Ten and All-Big Ten defensive team honors.

=== Junior season ===
During her junior season, she averaged 15.6 points, 5.5 assists, 5.8 rebounds, and 1.3 steals per game. She scored in double figures in 26 of her 32 games, including 20 or more points in eight games. On December 3, 2023, against George Mason she scored a then career-high 28 points and career-high 13 rebounds for fourth career double-double. On December 20, 2023, against James Madison she scored a career-high 29 points. Following the season she earned first-team all-Big Ten honors for the second consecutive season. She was also named a WBCA Division I Coaches All-America finalist and a top-ten finalist for the Nancy Lieberman Award.

=== Senior season ===
During her senior season, she averaged 14.6 points, 3.9 rebounds and 4.4 assists per game. She scored in double figures in 23 of her 27 games. On February 17, 2025, against Michigan, she scored 18 points, six rebounds and five assists, and became the first player in program history to surpass 1,500 points, 500 rebounds and 500 assists. Following the season she earned first-team all-Big Ten honors for the third consecutive season. She was also named a top-ten finalist for the Ann Meyers Drysdale Award.

== Professional career ==
On April 14, 2025, Sellers was drafted in the second round, 17th overall, by the Golden State Valkyries in the 2025 WNBA draft. She was waived by the Valkyries on May 3, 2025. On May 5, 2025, she was claimed off waivers by the Atlanta Dream. She was waived by the Dream on May 12, 2025.

Towards the end of the 2025 regular season, Sellers was featured — along with Diamond DeShields, Julie Vanloo, Haley Jones, and Harmoni Turner — in an ESPN article on life on the WNBA fringe given the league's limit of only 12 roster spots per team.

On September 11, 2025, Sellers signed with Maccabi Haifa of the Israeli Women's Basketball Premier League for the 2025–26 season.

Sellers signed a training camp contract with the Dallas Wings on April 12, 2026

In April 2026, it was announced Sellers signed with the UpShot League, a professional women's basketball league. She plays for the Jacksonville Waves.

On August 31, 2026, following the conclusion of the UpShot League playoffs, Sellers signed a WNBA Player Development contract with the Los Angeles Sparks.

== Personal life ==
Sellers was born to Brad and Kymberly Sellers. Her father, Brad, played college basketball at Wisconsin and Ohio State, and professionally in the National Basketball Association. He is currently the mayor of Warrensville Heights, Ohio. She has three sisters, Sydney, Syarra and Shayla. Syarra played college basketball at Thomas More, and Shayla played at Purdue Fort Wayne.

In 2024 and 2025, Sellers was invited to Kelsey Plum's Dawg Class, an Under Armour-sponsored camp to help top women college athletes transition from collegiate to professional basketball.

She is openly a member of the LGBTQ community. On April 11, 2025, she announced her engagement to former Maryland teammate, Faith Masonius.

== Career statistics ==
Legend
GP	Games played	GS	Games started	MPG	Minutes per game	RPG	Rebounds per game
APG	Assists per game	SPG	Steals per game	BPG	Blocks per game	PPG	Points per game
TO	Turnovers per game	FG%	Field-goal percentage	3P%	3-point field-goal percentage	FT%	Free-throw percentage
**Bold**	Career best	°	League leader

=== WNBA ===
WNBA regular season statistics
Year	Team	GP	GS	MPG	FG%	3P%	FT%	RPG	APG	SPG	BPG	TO	PPG
2026	Los Angeles	2	0	10.5	.167	.500	.500	1.0	1.0	1.0	.0	.5	2.0
**Career**	1 year, 1 team	2	0	10.5	.167	.500	.500	1.0	1.0	1.0	.0	.5	2.0

=== College ===
Year	Team	GP	GS	MPG	FG%	3P%	FT%	RPG	APG	SPG	BPG	TO	PPG
2021–22	Maryland	32	10	26.5	.414	.317	.717	3.8	2.6	**1.8**	.2	**1.3**	7.7
2022–23	Maryland	**35**	30	28.3	**.486**	.347	.807	4.8	3.9	**1.8**	**.6**	2.4	13.9
2023–24	Maryland	32	**32**	**32.3**	.434	.318	.849	**5.8**	**5.5**	1.3	**.6**	3.4	**15.6**
2024–25	Maryland	31	31	29.8	.462	**.408**	**.868**	3.8	4.1	.9	.2	3.3	14.4
**Career**		130	103	29.2	.452	.346	.830	4.6	4.0	1.5	.4	2.6	12.9
Statistics retrieved from Sports-Reference.
