= Harvard Crimson women's basketball =

2026–27 Harvard Crimson women's basketball team
- University: Harvard University
- First season: 1974; 52 years ago
- Head coach: Carrie Moore (5th season)
- Location: Boston, Massachusetts
- Arena: Lavietes Pavilion
- Conference: Ivy League
- Nickname: Crimson
- Colors: Crimson, white, and black

NCAA Division I tournament second round
- 1998

NCAA Division I tournament appearances
- 1996, 1997, 1998, 2002, 2003, 2007, 2025

Conference tournament champions
- 2025

Conference regular-season champions
- 1986, 1988, 1991, 1996, 1997, 1998, 2002, 2003, 2005, 2007, 2008

Uniforms
Home	Away

The Harvard Crimson women's basketball team is the intercollegiate women's basketball program representing Harvard University. The school competes in the Ivy League in Division I of the National Collegiate Athletic Association (NCAA). The Crimson play home basketball games at the Lavietes Pavilion in Boston, Massachusetts near the university campus. They are the first team in NCAA basketball history to win in national tournament play as a #16 seed against a #1 seed.

== History ==
Harvard has won the Ivy League eleven times, with four shared (1986, 1988, 2005, and 2008) and seven won outright (1991, 1996, 1997, 1998, 2002, 2003, and 2007). Harvard has lost twice in a playoff to determine the automatic bid to the NCAA Tournament, losing 75–61 to Dartmouth in 2005 and losing to Dartmouth 68–62 in 2008.

Season	Record	Conference Record	Coach
1974–75	10–5	n/a	John McCarthy
1975–76	9–10	1–5	John McCarthy
1976–77	18–3	5–1	Carole Kleinfelder
1977–78	13–10	4–3	Carole Kleinfelder
1978–79	17–11	5–2	Carole Kleinfelder
1979–80	12–14	3–4	Carole Kleinfelder
1980–81	8–18	1–6	Carole Kleinfelder
1981–82	4–21	2–4	Carole Kleinfelder
1982–83	7–17	3–9	Kathy Delaney-Smith
1983–84	3–22	2–10	Kathy Delaney-Smith
1984–85	8–18	2–10	Kathy Delaney-Smith
1985–86	20–7	9–3	Kathy Delaney-Smith
1986–87	13–13	8–6	Kathy Delaney-Smith
1987–88	21–5	12–2	Kathy Delaney-Smith
1988–89	15–11	9–5	Kathy Delaney-Smith
1989–90	14–12	9–5	Kathy Delaney-Smith
1990–91	17–9	12–2	Kathy Delaney-Smith
1991–92	14–12	11–3	Kathy Delaney-Smith
1992–93	16–9	11–3	Kathy Delaney-Smith
1993–94	7–19	4–10	Kathy Delaney-Smith
1994–95	19–7	11–3	Kathy Delaney-Smith
1995–96	20–7	13–1	Kathy Delaney-Smith
1996–97	20–7	14–0	Kathy Delaney-Smith
1997–98	23–5	12–2	Kathy Delaney-Smith
1998–99	10–15	7–7	Kathy Delaney-Smith
1999-00	16–10	9–5	Kathy Delaney-Smith
2000–01	12–15	9–5	Kathy Delaney-Smith
2001–02	22–6	13–1	Kathy Delaney-Smith
2002–03	22–5	14–0	Kathy Delaney-Smith
2003–04	16–11	9–5	Kathy Delaney-Smith
2004–05	20–8	12–2	Kathy Delaney-Smith
2005–06	12–15	8–6	Kathy Delaney-Smith
2006–07	15–13	13–1	Kathy Delaney-Smith
2007–08	18–11	11–3	Kathy Delaney-Smith
2008–09	19–10	11–3	Kathy Delaney-Smith
2009–10	20–9	11–3	Kathy Delaney-Smith
2010–11	18–10	10–4	Kathy Delaney-Smith
2011–12	18–12	10–4	Kathy Delaney-Smith
2012–13	21–9	11–3	Kathy Delaney-Smith
2013–14	22–8	11–3	Kathy Delaney-Smith
2014–15	14–14	7–7	Kathy Delaney-Smith
2015–16	14–14	9–5	Kathy Delaney-Smith
2016–17	21–9	8–6	Kathy Delaney-Smith
2017–18	18–11	10–4	Kathy Delaney-Smith
2018–19	17–13	9–5	Kathy Delaney-Smith
2019–20	15–12	6–8	Kathy Delaney-Smith
2021–22	13–14	7–7	Kathy Delaney-Smith
2022–23	20–12	9–5	Carrie Moore
2023–24	16–12	9–5	Carrie Moore
2024-25	24-4	11-3	Carrie Moore

== Postseason appearances ==
The Crimson have reached the NCAA Tournament seven times, with one postseason win in 1998 over Stanford 71–67. To date, this is the only time a #16 seed has beaten a #1 seed in women's NCAA Tournament history (In men's basketball, the UMBC Retrievers became the first to do so, 20 years later). The historic win sent them into the Second Round (only reached one other time in Ivy League history), where they lost 82–64 to Arkansas.

Year	Seed	Round	Opponent	Result
1996	#14	First Round	#3 Vanderbilt	L 83–100
1997	#16	First Round	#1 North Carolina	L 53–78
1998	#16	First Round; Second Round	#1 Stanford #9 Arkansas	W 71–67; L 64–82
2002	#13	First Round	#4 North Carolina	L 58–85
2003	#14	First Round	#3 Kansas State	L 69–79
2007	#15	First Round	#2 Maryland	L 65–89
2025	#10	First Round	#7 Michigan State	L 50–64
