= 2024–25 Fairfield Stags women's basketball team =

American college basketball season

2024–25 Fairfield Stags women's basketball
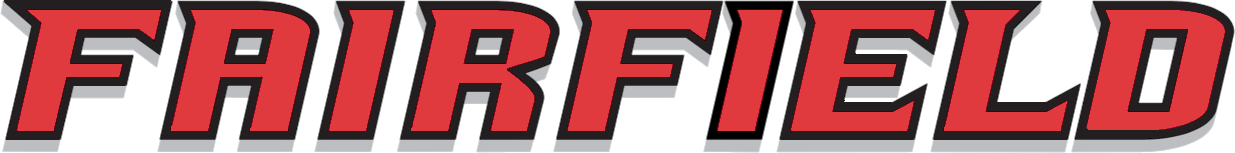

MAAC regular season and tournament champions

NCAA tournament, First Round
- Conference: Metro Atlantic Athletic Conference
- Record: 28–5 (19–1 MAAC)
- Head coach: Carly Thibault-DuDonis (3rd season)
- Assistant coaches: Erik Johnson; Erika Brown; Blake DuDonis; Alex McKinnon
- Home arena: Leo D. Mahoney Arena

2024–25 MAAC women's basketball standings
	Conf.				Overall
Team	W		L	PCT	W		L	PCT
Fairfield †	19	–	1	.950	28	–	5	.848
Quinnipiac	18	–	2	.900	28	–	5	.848
Siena	14	–	6	.700	17	–	14	.548
Mount St. Mary's	12	–	8	.600	15	–	16	.484
Marist	11	–	9	.550	16	–	15	.516
Merrimack	9	–	11	.450	14	–	17	.452
Saint Peter's	9	–	11	.450	11	–	19	.367
Manhattan	9	–	11	.450	16	–	15	.516
Canisius	9	–	11	.450	10	–	21	.323
Iona	8	–	12	.400	11	–	21	.344
Rider	5	–	15	.250	7	–	22	.241
Sacred Heart	5	–	15	.250	9	–	20	.310
Niagara	2	–	18	.100	3	–	25	.107
† 2025 MAAC tournament winner

The 2024–25 Fairfield Stags women's basketball team represented Fairfield University during the 2024–25 NCAA Division I women's basketball season. The Stags, led by third-year head coach Carly Thibault-DuDonis, played their home games at Leo D. Mahoney Arena in Fairfield, Connecticut as members of the Metro Atlantic Athletic Conference.

== Previous season ==
The Stags finished the 2023–24 season 31–2, 20–0 in MAAC play, to finish as MAAC regular season champions. They would defeat Rider, Canisius, and Niagara to win the MAAC tournament and earn the conference's automatic bid to the NCAA tournament. They received the #13 seed in the Albany Regional 1, where they would fall to #4 region seed Indiana in the first round.

== Roster ==
2024–25 Fairfield Stags women's basketball team
Players
Coaches

Pos.	#	Name	Height	Year	Previous school	Hometown
G	0	Jillian Huerter	6 ft 0 in (1.83 m)	So	Rutgers	Clifton Park, New York
G	1	Kendall McGruder	5 ft 9 in (1.75 m)	Sr	North Texas	Grand Prairie, Texas
G	3	Janelle Brown	5 ft 6 in (1.68 m)	GS	Longwood High School	Middle Island, New York
G	4	Kaety L'Amoreaux	5 ft 6 in (1.68 m)	So	Maine-Endwell High School	Endwell, New York
F	5	Meghan Andersen	6 ft 1 in (1.85 m)	So	Our Lady of Mercy Academy	Wantagh, New York
G	6	Izabela Nicoletti Leite	5 ft 10 in (1.78 m)	GS	Florida State	Americana, São Paulo, Brazil
G	7	Keyarah Gregory	5 ft 3 in (1.6 m)	Fr	Fort Erie International Academy	Pickering, Ontario
F	11	Karly Fischer	6 ft 2 in (1.88 m)	So	Albertus Magnus High School	Tappan, New York
F	13	Cyanne Coe	6 ft 0 in (1.83 m)	Fr	Capital Courts Academy	Bolton, Ontario
F	15	Lauren Beach	6 ft 1 in (1.85 m)	Sr	Medway High School	Medway, Massachusetts
G	22	Casey Prior	5 ft 7 in (1.7 m)	So	Red Bank Catholic High School	Sea Girt, New Jersey
F	23	Emina Selimovic	5 ft 10 in (1.78 m)	Sr	Siena	Erie, Pennsylvania
G	25	Sydni Scott	5 ft 8 in (1.73 m)	Jr	Marshall	Prospect Park, Pennsylvania
G	31	Julia Karpell	5 ft 11 in (1.8 m)	Fr	St. John Vianney High School	Holmdel, New Jersey
F	44	Raiana Brown	6 ft 0 in (1.83 m)	GS	Texas A&M International	Wheatley Heights, New York

Head coach

- Carly Thibault-DuDonis (Monmouth)

Assistant coach(es)

- Erik Johnson (UC San Diego)
- Erika Brown (Delaware)
- Blake DuDonis (Gardner–Webb)
- Alex McKinnon (Montclair State)

Legend

- (C) Team captain
- (S) Suspended
- (I) Ineligible
- (W) Walk-on
- Injured
- Current redshirt

Roster
Last update: February 15, 2025

== Schedule and results ==
Date time, TV	Rank^{#}	Opponent^{#}	Result	Record	Site (attendance) city, state
Non-conference regular season
November 4, 2024*; 7:30 pm, SECN+		at Arkansas	W 81–67	1–0	Bud Walton Arena (2,034); Fayetteville, AR
November 12, 2024*; 7:00 pm, ESPN+		Richmond	L 39–62	1–1	Leo D. Mahoney Arena (1,443); Fairfield, CT
November 16, 2024*; 3:00 pm, ESPN+		at Oklahoma State	L 62–64	1–2	Gallagher-Iba Arena (2,176); Stillwater, OK
November 20, 2024*; 7:00 pm, ESPN+		Central Connecticut	W 82–54	2–2	Leo D. Mahoney Arena (624); Fairfield, CT
November 25, 2024*; 6:00 pm, ESPN+		at Charleston Southern	W 79–36	3–2	Buccaneer Field House (456); North Charleston, SC
November 27, 2024*; 2:00 pm, ACCNX		at Wake Forest	W 72–65	4–2	LJVM Coliseum (788); Winston-Salem, NC
December 3, 2024*; 7:00 pm, ESPN+		Staten Island	W 94–47	5–2	Leo D. Mahoney Arena (678); Fairfield, CT
December 8, 2024*; 2:00 pm, ESPN+		Villanova	W 74–71	6–2	Leo D. Mahoney Arena (1,644); Fairfield, CT
December 15, 2024*; 2:00 pm, FloHoops		at St. John's	L 68–77	6–3	Carnesecca Arena (589); Queens, NY
MAAC regular season
December 21, 2024; 2:00 pm, ESPN+		Mount St. Mary's	W 76–61	7–3 (1–0)	Leo D. Mahoney Arena (764); Fairfield, CT
January 2, 2025; 6:00 pm, ESPN+		at Rider	W 69–37	8–3 (2–0)	Alumni Gymnasium (416); Lawrenceville, NJ
January 4, 2025; 2:00 pm, ESPN+		Merrimack	W 72–48	9–3 (3–0)	Leo D. Mahoney Arena (711); Fairfield, CT
January 9, 2025; 6:00 pm, ESPN+		at Iona	W 72–50	10–3 (4–0)	Hynes Athletics Center (969); New Rochelle, NY
January 11, 2025; 2:00 pm, ESPN+		Marist	W 70–31	11–3 (5–0)	Leo D. Mahoney Arena (747); Fairfield, CT
January 16, 2025; 11:00 am, ESPN+		at Niagara	W 96–49	12–3 (6–0)	Gallagher Center (1,175); Lewiston, NY
January 18, 2025; 1:00 pm, ESPN+		at Canisius	W 97–51	13–3 (7–0)	Koessler Athletic Center (432); Buffalo, NY
January 23, 2025; 11:00 am, ESPN+		Manhattan	W 69–44	14–3 (8–0)	Leo D. Mahoney Arena (3,573); Fairfield, CT
January 25, 2025; 3:00 pm, ESPN+		at Merrimack	W 74–55	15–3 (9–0)	Hammel Court (612); North Andover, MA
January 30, 2025; 7:00 pm, ESPN+		Quinnipiac	W 72–63	16–3 (10–0)	Leo D. Mahoney Arena (1,188); Fairfield, CT
February 1, 2025; 2:00 pm, ESPN+		Iona	W 63–46	17–3 (11–0)	Leo D. Mahoney Arena (1,340); Fairfield, CT
February 6, 2025; 7:00 pm, ESPN+		at Marist	W 80–49	18–3 (12–0)	McCann Arena (790); Poughkeepsie, NY
February 8, 2025; 2:00 pm, ESPN+		at Sacred Heart	W 82–76	19–3 (13–0)	William H. Pitt Center (810); Fairfield, CT
February 13, 2025; 7:00 pm, ESPN+		Saint Peter's	W 73–43	20–3 (14–0)	Leo D. Mahoney Arena (635); Fairfield, CT
February 15, 2025; 2:00 pm, ESPN+		at Manhattan	W 84–45	21–3 (15–0)	Draddy Gymnasium (205); Riverdale, NY
February 20, 2025; 7:00 pm, ESPN+		Rider	W 72-46	22-3 (16-0)	Leo D. Mahoney Arena (835); Fairfield, CT
February 27, 2025; 7:00 pm, ESPN+		at Mount St. Mary's	W 81-61	23-3 (17-0)	Knott Arena (627); Emmitsburg, MD
March 1, 2025; 7:00 pm, ESPN+		Sacred Heart	W 69-58	24-3 (18-0)	Leo D. Mahoney Arena (1,855); Fairfield, CT
March 6, 2025; 7:00 pm, ESPNU		Siena	W 62–49	25–3 (19–0)	Leo D. Mahoney Arena (838); Fairfield, CT
March 8, 2025; 4:00 pm, ESPN+		at Quinnipiac	L 65–72	25–4 (19–1)	M&T Bank Arena (1,442); Hamden, CT
MAAC tournament
March 12, 2025; 12:00 pm, ESPN+	(1)	vs. (8) Manhattan; Quarterfinals	W 58–51	26–4	Boardwalk Hall; Atlantic City, NJ
March 14, 2025; 12:00 pm, ESPN+	(1)	vs. (4) Mount St. Mary's; Quarterfinals	W 49–48	27–4	Boardwalk Hall; Atlantic City, NJ
March 15, 2025; 1:30 pm, ESPNU	(1)	vs. (2) Quinnipiac; Championship	W 76–53	28–4	Boardwalk Hall; Atlantic City, NJ
NCAA tournament
March 21, 2025*; 2:30 p.m., ESPNews	(12 S4)	vs. (5 S4) No. 19 Kansas State; First Round	L 41–85	28–5	Memorial Coliseum (6,865); Lexington, KY
*Non-conference game. ^{#}Rankings from AP Poll. (#) Tournament seedings in parentheses. All times are in Eastern.
