= 2024–25 Quinnipiac Bobcats women's basketball team =

American college basketball season

2024–25 Quinnipiac Bobcats women's basketball
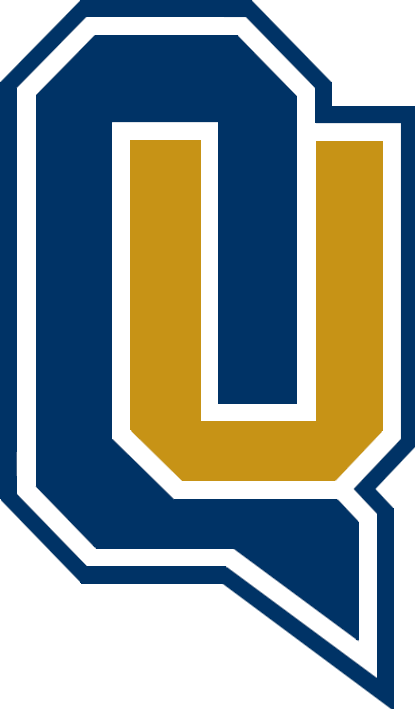

WBIT, First Round
- Conference: Metro Atlantic Athletic Conference
- Record: 28–5 (18–2 MAAC)
- Head coach: Tricia Fabbri (30th season)
- Associate head coach: William Sullivan
- Assistant coaches: Sam Guastella; Cur'Tiera Haywood
- Home arena: M&T Bank Arena

2024–25 MAAC women's basketball standings
	Conf.				Overall
Team	W		L	PCT	W		L	PCT
Fairfield †	19	–	1	.950	28	–	5	.848
Quinnipiac	18	–	2	.900	28	–	5	.848
Siena	14	–	6	.700	17	–	14	.548
Mount St. Mary's	12	–	8	.600	15	–	16	.484
Marist	11	–	9	.550	16	–	15	.516
Merrimack	9	–	11	.450	14	–	17	.452
Saint Peter's	9	–	11	.450	11	–	19	.367
Manhattan	9	–	11	.450	16	–	15	.516
Canisius	9	–	11	.450	10	–	21	.323
Iona	8	–	12	.400	11	–	21	.344
Rider	5	–	15	.250	7	–	22	.241
Sacred Heart	5	–	15	.250	9	–	20	.310
Niagara	2	–	18	.100	3	–	25	.107
† 2025 MAAC tournament winner

The 2024–25 Quinnipiac Bobcats women's basketball team represented Quinnipiac University during the 2024–25 NCAA Division I women's basketball season. The Bobcats, led by 30th-year head coach Tricia Fabbri, played their home games at M&T Bank Arena in Hamden, Connecticut as members of the Metro Atlantic Athletic Conference.

== Previous season ==
The Bobcats finished the 2023–24 season 13–18, 9–11 in MAAC play, to finish in seventh place. They defeated Saint Peter's, before falling to Niagara in the quarterfinals of the MAAC tournament.

== Roster ==
2024–25 Quinnipiac Bobcats women's basketball team
Players
Coaches

Pos.	#	Name	Height	Year	Previous school	Hometown
G	2	Gracie Gopalan	5 ft 4 in (1.63 m)	Fr	Waupun Area High School	Waupun, Wisconsin
F	4	Grace LaBarge (C)	6 ft 3 in (1.91 m)	Sr	William Fremd High School	Inverness, Illinois
G	5	Paige Girardi	5 ft 9 in (1.75 m)	So	Warwick Valley High School	Warwick, New York
F	7	Caranda Perea	6 ft 2 in (1.88 m)	GS	Tulsa	Altoona, Pennsylvania
G	10	Maria Kealy	5 ft 9 in (1.75 m)	So	Loreto Letterkenny	Donegal, Ireland
G/F	11	Bri Bowen	5 ft 10 in (1.78 m)	Jr	Delaware	Chalfont, Pennsylvania
F	12	Ella O'Donnell	6 ft 3 in (1.91 m)	Jr	Rathdown School	Shankill, Ireland
F	13	Emma Lizotte	6 ft 3 in (1.91 m)	Fr	Thornton Academy	Saco, Maine
G	14	Gal Raviv	5 ft 9 in (1.75 m)	Fr	Bella Vista Prep	Kadima, Israel
G	15	Karson Martin	5 ft 7 in (1.7 m)	So	Woodstock High School	Woodstock, Georgia
G	21	Jackie Grisdale (C)	5 ft 9 in (1.75 m)	Sr	Poland High School	Poland, Ohio
G	22	Reagan Sipla	6 ft 1 in (1.85 m)	Fr	St. Charles North High School	St. Charles, Illinois
F/C	23	Anna Foley	6 ft 3 in (1.91 m)	So	Andover High School	Andover, Massachusetts
G	24	Ava Sollenne	5 ft 6 in (1.68 m)	So	St. Luke's School	Greenwich, Connecticut
C	33	Khadijah Tungo	6 ft 6 in (1.98 m)	Jr	Complexo Escolar Privado Frei Joao Domingos	Luanda, Angola

Head coach

- Tricia Fabbri (Fairfield)

Assistant coach(es)

- William Sullivan (Connecticut)
- Sam Guastella (Quinnipiac)
- Cur'Tiera Haywood (Quinnipiac)

Legend

- (C) Team captain
- (S) Suspended
- (I) Ineligible
- (W) Walk-on
- Injured
- Current redshirt

Roster
Last update: February 17, 2025

== Schedule and results ==
Date time, TV	Rank^{#}	Opponent^{#}	Result	Record	Site (attendance) city, state
Exhibition
October 26, 2024*; 12:00 pm		Southern Connecticut	W 62–45	–	M&T Bank Arena; Hamden, CT
Non-conference regular season
November 4, 2024*; 6:00 pm, ESPN+		at Holy Cross	W 78–74	1–0	Hart Center (1,014); Worcester, MA
November 10, 2024*; 2:00 pm, ESPN+		Harvard	W 76–53	2–0	M&T Bank Arena (637); Hamden, CT
November 16, 2024*; 2:00 pm, ESPN+		Princeton	W 74–66	3–0	M&T Bank Arena (685); Hamden, CT
November 21, 2024*; 6:00 pm, ESPN+		Cornell	W 56–47	4–0	M&T Bank Arena (365); Hamden, CT
November 24, 2024*; 2:30 pm, ESPN+		at Maine	W 61–53	5–0	Memorial Gymnasium (1,268); Orono, ME
November 29, 2024*; 5:00 pm		vs. Southeastern Louisiana; Miami Thanksgiving Tournament	W 70–53	6–0	Watsco Center (350); Coral Gables, FL
December 1, 2024*; 2:30 pm, ACCNX		at Miami (FL); Miami Thanksgiving Tournament	L 74–83 ^{OT}	6–1	Watsco Center (2,080); Coral Gables, FL
December 9, 2024*; 6:00 pm, ESPN+		Yale	W 76–50	7–1	M&T Bank Arena (419); Hamden, CT
December 15, 2024*; 2:00 pm, ESPN+		at Vermont	W 68–63	8–1	Patrick Gym (791); Burlington, VT
MAAC regular season
December 19, 2024; 11:00 am, ESPN+		Rider	W 70–62	9–1 (1–0)	M&T Bank Arena (2,943); Hamden, CT
December 21, 2024; 2:00 pm, ESPN+		at Sacred Heart	W 78–63	10–1 (2–0)	William H. Pitt Center (708); Fairfield, CT
January 2, 2025; 6:00 pm, ESPN+		Saint Peter's	W 54–39	11–1 (3–0)	M&T Bank Arena (355); Hamden, CT
January 4, 2025; 1:00 pm, ESPN+		Marist	W 64–52	12–1 (4–0)	M&T Bank Arena (653); Hamden, CT
January 9, 2025; 11:00 am, ESPN+		at Siena	W 69–51	13–1 (5–0)	UHY Center (2,148); Loudonville, NY
January 11, 2025; 2:00 pm, ESPN+		Iona	W 66–58	14–1 (6–0)	M&T Bank Arena (558); Hamden, CT
January 16, 2025; 7:00 pm, ESPN+		at Merrimack	W 72–67	15–1 (7–0)	Hammel Court (478); North Andover, MA
January 18, 2025; 2:00 pm, ESPN+		Mount St. Mary's	L 64–69 ^{OT}	15–2 (7–1)	M&T Bank Arena (541); Hamden, CT
January 25, 2025; 2:00 pm, ESPN+		at Rider	W 66–53	16–2 (8–1)	Alumni Gymnasium (466); Lawrenceville, NJ
January 30, 2025; 7:00 pm, ESPN+		at Fairfield	L 63–72	16–3 (8–2)	Leo D. Mahoney Arena (1,188); Fairfield, CT
February 1, 2025; 2:00 pm, ESPN+		Siena	W 77–74	17–3 (9–2)	M&T Bank Arena (624); Hamden, CT
February 6, 2025; 6:00 pm, ESPN+		at Canisius	W 56–41	18–3 (10–2)	Koessler Athletic Center (486); Buffalo, NY
February 8, 2025; 2:00 pm, ESPN+		at Niagara	W 70–38	19–3 (11–2)	Gallagher Center (464); Lewiston, NY
February 13, 2025; 6:00 pm, ESPN+		Sacred Heart	W 71–47	20–3 (12–2)	M&T Bank Arena (412); Hamden, CT
February 15, 2025; 1:00 pm, ESPN+		at Iona	W 74–66	21–3 (13–2)	Hynes Athletics Center (1,060); New Rochelle, NY
February 22, 2025; 2:00 pm, ESPN+		Manhattan	W 60–40	22–3 (14–2)	M&T Bank Arena (702); Hamden, CT
February 27, 2025; 7:00 pm, ESPN+		at Saint Peter's	W 74–65	23–3 (15–2)	Run Baby Run Arena (376); Jersey City, NJ
March 1, 2025; 2:00 pm, ESPN+		Merrimack	W 76–44	24–3 (16–2)	M&T Bank Arena (974); Hamden, CT
March 6, 2025; 7:00 pm, ESPN+		at Mount St. Mary's	W 64–60	25–3 (17–2)	Knott Arena (316); Emmitsburg, MD
March 8, 2025; 4:00 pm, ESPN+		Fairfield	W 72–65	26–3 (18–2)	M&T Bank Arena (1,442); Hamden, CT
MAAC tournament
March 12, 2025; 2:30 pm, ESPN+	(2)	vs. (10) Iona; Quarterfinals	W 79–51	27–3	Boardwalk Hall (1,057); Atlantic City, NJ
March 14, 2025; 2:30 pm, ESPN+	(2)	vs. (6) Merrimack; Semifinals	W 65–51	28–3	Boardwalk Hall; Atlantic City, NJ
March 15, 2025; 1:30 pm, ESPNU	(2)	vs. (1) Fairfield; Championship	L 53–76	28–4	Boardwalk Hall; Atlantic City, NJ
WBIT
March 20, 2025*; 7:00 pm, ESPN+		at (3) Seton Hall; First round	L 40–57	28–5	Walsh Gymnasium; South Orange, NJ
*Non-conference game. ^{#}Rankings from AP Poll. (#) Tournament seedings in parentheses. All times are in Eastern.
