= 2024–25 Mount St. Mary's Mountaineers women's basketball team =

American college basketball season

2024–25 Mount St. Mary's Mountaineers women's basketball
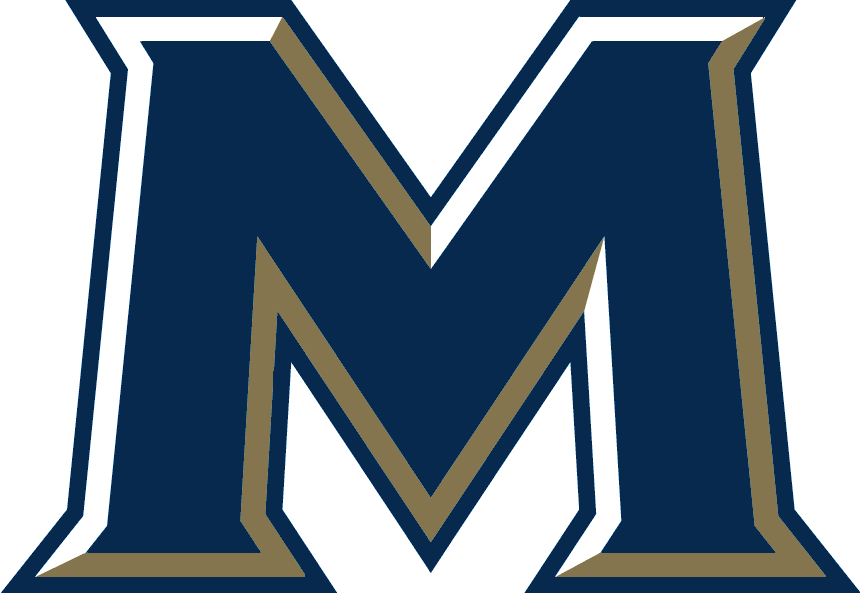
- Conference: Metro Atlantic Athletic Conference
- Record: 12–11 (10–4 MAAC)
- Head coach: Antoine White (4th season)
- Assistant coaches: Kelsey Funderburgh; Danielle Durjan; Riley Maye
- Home arena: Knott Arena

2024–25 MAAC women's basketball standings
	Conf.				Overall
Team	W		L	PCT	W		L	PCT
Fairfield †	19	–	1	.950	28	–	5	.848
Quinnipiac	18	–	2	.900	28	–	5	.848
Siena	14	–	6	.700	17	–	14	.548
Mount St. Mary's	12	–	8	.600	15	–	16	.484
Marist	11	–	9	.550	16	–	15	.516
Merrimack	9	–	11	.450	14	–	17	.452
Saint Peter's	9	–	11	.450	11	–	19	.367
Manhattan	9	–	11	.450	16	–	15	.516
Canisius	9	–	11	.450	10	–	21	.323
Iona	8	–	12	.400	11	–	21	.344
Rider	5	–	15	.250	7	–	22	.241
Sacred Heart	5	–	15	.250	9	–	20	.310
Niagara	2	–	18	.100	3	–	25	.107
† 2025 MAAC tournament winner

The 2024–25 Mount St. Mary's Mountaineers women's basketball team represented Mount St. Mary's University during the 2024–25 NCAA Division I women's basketball season. The Mountaineers, led by fourth-year head coach Antoine White, played their home games at Knott Arena in Emmitsburg, Maryland as members of the Metro Atlantic Athletic Conference.

== Previous season ==
The Mountaineers finished the 2023–24 season 14–17, 10–10 in MAAC play, to finish in sixth place. They defeated Marist, before falling to Siena in the quarterfinals of the MAAC tournament.

== Roster ==
2024–25 Mount St. Mary's Mountaineers women's basketball team
Players
Coaches

Pos.	#	Name	Height	Year	Previous school	Hometown
G	0	Nyodie Guerard	5 ft 8 in (1.73 m)	Fr	Cégep de Sainte-Foy	Quebec City, Quebec
G	1	Wesleigh Ferguson	6 ft 0 in (1.83 m)	Fr	IMG Academy	Benton, Arkansas
F	2	Tessa Engelman	6 ft 3 in (1.91 m)	So	DME Academy	Calgary, Alberta
G	3	Madison Ruff	5 ft 9 in (1.75 m)	Fr	Baldwin High School	Sparta, Georgia
G	4	Jo Raflo	5 ft 11 in (1.8 m)	Sr	Presbyterian	Gainesville, Virginia
F	5	Lenora Nkangwen	6 ft 2 in (1.88 m)	Fr	Connelly School of the Holy Child	Upper Marlboro, Maryland
G	6	Rosa Revueltas Pareja	5 ft 8 in (1.73 m)	Sr	Arizona Western	Almería, Spain
G	10	Anna LeMaster	5 ft 9 in (1.75 m)	GS	American	Ashburn, Virginia
G	11	Heather Middleton	6 ft 0 in (1.83 m)	Jr	CCBC Essex	Odenton, Maryland
G	12	Giana Hoddinott	5 ft 9 in (1.75 m)	RS So	Delone Catholic High School	Littlestown, Pennsylvania
G	15	Gabrielle Kennerly	5 ft 9 in (1.75 m)	RS Fr	Howard High School	Charlotte, North Carolina
F	20	Jaedyn Jamison	6 ft 1 in (1.85 m)	RS Jr	Franklin County High School	Rocky Mount, Virginia
F	23	Teodora Ivanovic	6 ft 3 in (1.91 m)	Fr	Central Pointe Christian Academy	Belgrade, Serbia
G	24	Die Diop	5 ft 8 in (1.73 m)	Fr	Life Christian Academy	North Chesterfield, Virginia

Head coach

- Antoine White (Southern Vermont)

Assistant coach(es)

- Kelsey Funderburgh (Walsh)
- Danielle Durjan (Towson)
- Riley Maye (Norfolk State)

Legend

- (C) Team captain
- (S) Suspended
- (I) Ineligible
- (W) Walk-on
- Injured
- Current redshirt

Roster
Last update: February 18, 2025

== Schedule and results ==
Date time, TV	Rank^{#}	Opponent^{#}	Result	Record	Site (attendance) city, state
Non-conference regular season
November 7, 2024*; 7:00 pm, ESPN+		at South Florida	L 51–68	0–1	Yuengling Center (2,171); Tampa, FL
November 10, 2024*; 3:00 pm, ESPN+		Fairleigh Dickinson	L 59–63	0–2	Knott Arena (601); Emmitsburg, MD
November 13, 2024*; 7:00 pm, ESPN+		Howard	L 35–39	0–3	Knott Arena (518); Emmitsburg, MD
November 20, 2024*; 6:00 pm, ESPN+		at Bucknell	L 47–63	0–4	Sojka Pavilion (289); Lewisburg, PA
November 26, 2024*; 7:00 pm, ESPN+		at George Mason	L 51–87	0–5	EagleBank Arena (882); Fairfax, VA
December 3, 2024*; 7:00 pm, B1G+		at No. 7 Maryland	L 52–87	0–6	Xfinity Center (4,678); College Park, MD
December 7, 2024*; 2:00 pm, ESPN+		Loyola (MD)	W 65–48	1–6	Knott Arena (355); Emmitsburg, MD
December 16, 2024*; 6:00 pm, NEC Front Row		at Mercyhurst	W 88–83 ^{OT}	2–6	Owen McCormick Court (189); Erie, PA
MAAC regular season
December 19, 2024; 7:00 pm, ESPN+		Marist	L 50–61 ^{OT}	2–7 (0–1)	Knott Arena (161); Emmitsburg, MD
December 21, 2024; 2:00 pm, ESPN+		at Fairfield	L 61–76	2–8 (0–2)	Leo D. Mahoney Arena (764); Fairfield, CT
December 30, 2024*; 2:00 pm, ESPN+		at Morgan State	L 68–72	2–9	Hill Field House (89); Baltimore, MD
January 4, 2025; 1:00 pm, ESPN+		at Niagara	W 89–68	3–9 (1–2)	Gallagher Center (294); Lewiston, NY
January 9, 2025; 7:00 pm, ESPN+		Manhattan	L 47–75	3–10 (1–3)	Knott Arena (212); Emmitsburg, MD
January 11, 2025; 12:00 pm, ESPN+		at Sacred Heart	W 75–51	4–10 (2–3)	William H. Pitt Center (586); Fairfield, CT
January 16, 2025; 7:00 pm, ESPN+		Rider	W 66–60	5–10 (3–3)	Knott Arena (471); Emmitsburg, MD
January 18, 2025; 2:00 pm, ESPN+		at Quinnipiac	W 69–64 ^{OT}	6–10 (4–3)	M&T Bank Arena (541); Hamden, CT
January 23, 2025; 7:00 pm, ESPN+		Siena	W 92–57	7–10 (5–3)	Knott Arena (411); Emmitsburg, MD
January 25, 2025; 2:00 pm, ESPN+		at Manhattan	W 80–66	8–10 (6–3)	Draddy Gymnasium (220); Riverdale, NY
January 30, 2025; 7:00 pm, ESPN+		Merrimack	W 75–49	9–10 (7–3)	Knott Arena (729); Emmitsburg, MD
February 1, 2025; 2:00 pm, ESPN+		Saint Peter's	W 79–59	10–10 (8–3)	Knott Arena (611); Emmitsburg, MD
February 6, 2025; 6:00 pm, ESPN+		at Iona	L 60–62	10–11 (8–4)	Hynes Athletics Center (932); New Rochelle, NY
February 13, 2025; 7:00 pm, ESPN+		Niagara	W 75–54	11–11 (9–4)	Knott Arena (245); Emmitsburg, MD
February 15, 2025; 2:00 pm, ESPN+		Canisius	W 72–59	12–11 (10–4)	Knott Arena (561); Emmitsburg, MD
February 20, 2025; 7:00 pm, ESPN+		at Saint Peter's	L 54–70	12–12 (10–5)	Run Baby Run Arena (150); Jersey City, NJ
February 22, 2025; 5:00 pm, ESPN+		at Rider	W 76–49	13–12 (11–5)	Alumni Gymnasium (414); Lawrenceville, NJ
February 27, 2025; 7:00 pm, ESPN+		Fairfield	L 61–81	13–13 (11–6)	Knott Arena (627); Emmitsburg, MD
March 1, 2025; 2:00 pm, ESPN+		at Siena	L 49–52	13–14 (11–7)	UHY Center (545); Loudonville, NY
March 6, 2025; 7:00 pm, ESPN+		Quinnipiac	L 60–64	13–15 (11–8)	Knott Arena (316); Emmitsburg, MD
March 8, 2025; 2:00 pm, ESPN+		at Marist	W 61–50	14–15 (12–8)	McCann Arena (1,152); Poughkeepsie, NY
MAAC tournament
March 13, 2025; 12:00 pm, ESPN+	(4)	vs. (5) Marist; Quarterfinals			Boardwalk Hall; Atlantic City, NJ
*Non-conference game. ^{#}Rankings from AP Poll. (#) Tournament seedings in parentheses. All times are in Eastern.
