= 2024–25 Merrimack Warriors women's basketball team =

American college basketball season

2024–25 Merrimack Warriors women's basketball
- Conference: Metro Atlantic Athletic Conference
- Record: 11–14 (7–9 MAAC)
- Head coach: Kelly Morrone (5th season)
- Assistant coaches: Jermaine Cooper Sr.; Paige McCormick; Victoria Lux; Didier Dinh
- Home arena: Hammel Court

2024–25 MAAC women's basketball standings
	Conf.				Overall
Team	W		L	PCT	W		L	PCT
Fairfield †	19	–	1	.950	28	–	5	.848
Quinnipiac	18	–	2	.900	28	–	5	.848
Siena	14	–	6	.700	17	–	14	.548
Mount St. Mary's	12	–	8	.600	15	–	16	.484
Marist	11	–	9	.550	16	–	15	.516
Merrimack	9	–	11	.450	14	–	17	.452
Saint Peter's	9	–	11	.450	11	–	19	.367
Manhattan	9	–	11	.450	16	–	15	.516
Canisius	9	–	11	.450	10	–	21	.323
Iona	8	–	12	.400	11	–	21	.344
Rider	5	–	15	.250	7	–	22	.241
Sacred Heart	5	–	15	.250	9	–	20	.310
Niagara	2	–	18	.100	3	–	25	.107
† 2025 MAAC tournament winner

The 2024–25 Merrimack Warriors women's basketball team represented Merrimack College during the 2024–25 NCAA Division I women's basketball season. The Warriors, led by fifth-year head coach Kelly Morrone, played their home games at Hammel Court, with some games at Lawler Arena, in North Andover, Massachusetts as first-year members of the Metro Atlantic Athletic Conference.

== Previous season ==
The Warriors finished the 2023–24 season 12–19, 8–8 in NEC play, to finish in fourth place. They defeated Central Connecticut, before falling to top-seeded and eventual tournament champions Sacred Heart in the semifinals of the NEC tournament.

This would be the last season for Merrimack as members of the Northeast Conference, as they joined the Metro Atlantic Athletic Conference for the 2024–25 season.

== Roster ==
2024–25 Merrimack Warriors women's basketball team
Players
Coaches

Pos.	#	Name	Height	Year	Previous school	Hometown
F	0	Madison Roman	6 ft 0 in (1.83 m)	So	Fairfield Ludlowe High School	Fairfield, Connecticut
G	1	Dejah Jenkins	5 ft 7 in (1.7 m)	GS	Manhattan	Dorchester, Massachusetts
G	2	Daria Shishkina	5 ft 10 in (1.78 m)	Fr	Spire Academy	Moscow, Russia
G	4	Rylie Rosenberg	5 ft 3 in (1.6 m)	Fr	Hoosac School	New Rochelle, New York
G	5	Mia Fiore	5 ft 10 in (1.78 m)	Fr	St. George's School	Narragansett, Rhode Island
G	10	Paloma Garcia	5 ft 6 in (1.68 m)	So	Proctor Academy	Corozal, Puerto Rico
G	11	Thalia Shepard	5 ft 9 in (1.75 m)	So	St. Andrew's School	Boston, Massachusetts
F	12	Claudia Gallegos	6 ft 2 in (1.88 m)	Sr	Southern Indiana	Naperville, Illinois
F	21	Cadence Johnson	6 ft 0 in (1.83 m)	So	St. Andrew's School	Mattapoisett, Massachusetts
G	22	Lydia Melaschenko	5 ft 7 in (1.7 m)	Jr	Capital Courts Academy	Ottawa, Ontario
G	24	Molly Manion	5 ft 11 in (1.8 m)	Sr	West Chester Henderson High School	West Chester, Pennsylvania
G	30	Kristen Kelley	6 ft 0 in (1.83 m)	Fr	Marion L. Steele High School	Amherst, Ohio
F	32	Kylee Fears	6 ft 1 in (1.85 m)	RS Fr	Talawanda High School	Oxford, Ohio
G/F	40	Rose Caso	5 ft 10 in (1.78 m)	RS Jr	Quinnipiac	Ellington, Connecticut

Head coach

- Kelly Morrone (South Carolina)

Assistant coach(es)

- Jermaine Cooper Sr. (Ohio State)
- Paige McCormick (Merrimack)
- Victoria Lux (Bentley)
- Didier Dinh (Salem State)

Legend

- (C) Team captain
- (S) Suspended
- (I) Ineligible
- (W) Walk-on
- Injured
- Current redshirt

Roster
Last update: February 22, 2025

== Schedule and results ==
Date time, TV	Rank^{#}	Opponent^{#}	Result	Record	Site (attendance) city, state
Non-conference regular season
November 4, 2024*; 6:00 pm, ESPN+		at Bryant	L 50–65	0–1	Chace Athletic Center (450); Smithfield, RI
November 8, 2024*; 2:00 pm, ESPN+		at Penn	L 52–64	0–2	Palestra (306); Philadelphia, PA
November 11, 2024*; 3:00 pm, ESPN+		New Hampshire	W 59–49	1–2	Hammel Court (524); North Andover, MA
November 16, 2024*; 7:00 pm, ESPN+		Bucknell	W 62–59	2–2	Lawler Arena (247); North Andover, MA
November 19, 2024*; 7:00 pm, ESPN+		at Yale	W 50–45	3–2	John J. Lee Amphitheater (372); New Haven, CT
November 23, 2024*; 2:00 pm, ESPN+		NJIT	W 87–76	4–2	Hammel Court (449); North Andover, MA
December 5, 2024*; 11:00 am, ESPN+		at South Florida	L 43–62	4–3	Yuengling Center (9,821); Tampa, FL
December 14, 2024*; 12:00 pm, FloHoops		at Providence	L 44–62	4–4	Alumni Hall (705); Providence, RI
December 16, 2024*; 6:30 pm, ESPN+		at Albany	L 64–79	4–5	Broadview Center (1,047); Albany, NY
MAAC regular season
December 19, 2024; 7:00 pm, ESPN+		Canisius	W 62–47	5–5 (1–0)	Hammel Court (131); North Andover, MA
December 21, 2024; 2:00 pm, ESPN+		Niagara	W 71–56	6–5 (2–0)	Hammel Court (142); North Andover, MA
January 4, 2025; 2:00 pm, ESPN+		at Fairfield	L 48–72	6–6 (2–1)	Leo D. Mahoney Arena (711); Fairfield, CT
January 9, 2025; 7:00 pm, ESPN+		Sacred Heart	W 64–53	7–6 (3–1)	Hammel Court; North Andover, MA
January 11, 2025; 2:00 pm, ESPN+		at Manhattan	L 61–77	7–7 (3–2)	Draddy Gymnasium (271); Riverdale, NY
January 16, 2025; 7:00 pm, ESPN+		Quinnipiac	L 67–72	7–8 (3–3)	Hammel Court (478); North Andover, MA
January 18, 2025; 2:00 pm, ESPN+		at Siena	L 57–79	7–9 (3–4)	UHY Center (418); Loudonville, NY
January 23, 2025; 7:00 pm, ESPN+		Saint Peter's	W 64–49	8–9 (4–4)	Lawler Arena (316); North Andover, MA
January 25, 2025; 3:00 pm, ESPN+		Fairfield	L 55–74	8–10 (4–5)	Hammel Court (612); North Andover, MA
January 30, 2025; 7:00 pm, ESPN+		at Mount St. Mary's	L 49–75	8–11 (4–6)	Knott Arena (729); Emmitsburg, MD
February 1, 2025; 3:00 pm, ESPN+		Rider	L 63–65	8–12 (4–7)	Hammel Court (313); North Andover, MA
February 6, 2025; 6:00 pm, ESPN+		at Niagara	W 66–52	9–12 (5–7)	Gallagher Center (381); Lewiston, NY
February 8, 2025; 1:00 pm, ESPN+		at Canisius	L 62–68	9–13 (5–8)	Koessler Athletic Center (535); Buffalo, NY
February 13, 2025; 7:00 pm, ESPN+		Manhattan	W 71–69	10–13 (6–8)	Lawler Arena (263); North Andover, MA
February 15, 2025; 1:00 pm, ESPN+		at Marist	W 55–48	11–13 (7–8)	McCann Arena (672); Poughkeepsie, NY
February 20, 2025; 7:00 pm, ESPN+		at Sacred Heart	L 48–74	11–14 (7–9)	William H. Pitt Center (620); Fairfield, CT
February 22, 2025; 3:00 pm, ESPN+		Iona	W 81–36	12–14 (8–9)	Hammel Court (418); North Andover, MA
February 27, 2025; 6:00 pm, ESPN+		at Rider	L 61–64	12–15 (8–10)	Alumni Gymnasium (386); Lawrenceville, NJ
March 1, 2025; 2:00 pm, ESPN+		at Quinnipiac	L 44–76	12–16 (8–11)	M&T Bank Arena (974); Hamden, CT
March 6, 2025; 7:00 pm, ESPN+		Marist	W 55–47	13–16 (9–11)	Hammel Court (367); North Andover, MA
MAAC tournament
March 13, 2025; 2:30 pm, ESPN+	(6)	vs. (3) Siena; Quarterfinals	W 79–72	14–16	Boardwalk Hall; Atlantic City, NJ
March 14, 2025; 2:30 pm, ESPN+	(6)	vs. (2) Quinnipiac; Semifinals	L 51–65	14–17	Boardwalk Hall; Atlantic City, NJ
*Non-conference game. ^{#}Rankings from AP Poll. (#) Tournament seedings in parentheses. All times are in Eastern.
