= 2024–25 Sacred Heart Pioneers women's basketball team =

American college basketball season

2024–25 Sacred Heart Pioneers women's basketball
- Conference: Metro Atlantic Athletic Conference
- Record: 7–18 (3–13 MAAC)
- Head coach: Jessica Mannetti (12th season)
- Associate head coach: Marc Taney
- Assistant coaches: Jacinda Dunbar; Jen Peel
- Home arena: William H. Pitt Center

2024–25 MAAC women's basketball standings
	Conf.				Overall
Team	W		L	PCT	W		L	PCT
Fairfield †	19	–	1	.950	28	–	5	.848
Quinnipiac	18	–	2	.900	28	–	5	.848
Siena	14	–	6	.700	17	–	14	.548
Mount St. Mary's	12	–	8	.600	15	–	16	.484
Marist	11	–	9	.550	16	–	15	.516
Merrimack	9	–	11	.450	14	–	17	.452
Saint Peter's	9	–	11	.450	11	–	19	.367
Manhattan	9	–	11	.450	16	–	15	.516
Canisius	9	–	11	.450	10	–	21	.323
Iona	8	–	12	.400	11	–	21	.344
Rider	5	–	15	.250	7	–	22	.241
Sacred Heart	5	–	15	.250	9	–	20	.310
Niagara	2	–	18	.100	3	–	25	.107
† 2025 MAAC tournament winner

The 2024–25 Sacred Heart Pioneers women's basketball team represented Sacred Heart University during the 2024–25 NCAA Division I women's basketball season. The Pioneers, led by 12th-year head coach Jessica Mannetti, played their home games at the William H. Pitt Center in Fairfield, Connecticut as first-year members of the Metro Atlantic Athletic Conference.

== Previous season ==
The Pioneers finished the 2023–24 season 24–10, 15–1 in NEC play, to finish as NEC regular-season champions. They defeated Saint Francis, Merrimack, and Le Moyne to win the NEC tournament championship for the second year in a row, and in turn, earned the NEC's automatic bid to the NCAA tournament. They received the #16 seed in the Albany Regional 1, where they were defeated by Presbyterian in the First Four.

This was the last season for Sacred Heart as members of the Northeast Conference, as they joined the Metro Atlantic Athletic Conference for the 2024–25 season.

== Roster ==
2024–25 Sacred Heart Pioneers women's basketball team
Players
Coaches

Pos.	#	Name	Height	Year	Previous school	Hometown
G	0	Montana Nicks	5 ft 6 in (1.68 m)	So	Dwight-Englewood School	Englewood, New Jersey
G	1	Ny'Ceara Pryor	5 ft 3 in (1.6 m)	Jr	Western High School	Baltimore, Maryland
G	2	Thai Davis	5 ft 6 in (1.68 m)	So	Beaver Country Day School	Stoughton, Massachusetts
F	4	Nalyce Dudley	5 ft 11 in (1.8 m)	So	New London High School	Norwich, Connecticut
G	5	Grace John	5 ft 5 in (1.65 m)	Jr	Barton Community College	Bayelsa, Nigeria
G	6	Carmen Williams	5 ft 10 in (1.78 m)	Sr	George Mason	Voorhees, New Jersey
C	10	Emma Kirby	6 ft 2 in (1.88 m)	So	Tatnall School	Chadds Ford, Pennsylvania
G	12	Afia Owusu-Mensah	5 ft 9 in (1.75 m)	Sr	CMIT Academy North	Glenn Dale, Maryland
C	14	Esther Kursite	6 ft 2 in (1.88 m)	Fr	City of London Academy	London, England
F	22	Ciara Brannon	6 ft 2 in (1.88 m)	GS	Wagner	Westampton, New Jersey
G	23	Faith Pappas	5 ft 11 in (1.8 m)	Jr	Fordham	Long Valley, New Jersey
G	24	Sierra Johnson	5 ft 8 in (1.73 m)	Jr	TPLS Christian Academy	Richmond, Virginia
G	33	Amelia Wood	6 ft 0 in (1.83 m)	Jr	Averill Park High School	Wynantskill, New York
G	44	Dianne Crespo López	5 ft 10 in (1.78 m)	Fr	Colegio Adianez	Río Grande, Puerto Rico

Head coach

- Jessica Mannetti (Concordia (NY))

Assistant coach(es)

- Marc Taney (Springfield)
- Jacinda Dunbar (Quinnipiac)
- Jen Peel (Saint Anselm)

Legend

- (C) Team captain
- (S) Suspended
- (I) Ineligible
- (W) Walk-on
- Injured
- Current redshirt

Roster
Last update: February 23, 2025

== Schedule and results ==
Date time, TV	Rank^{#}	Opponent^{#}	Result	Record	Site (attendance) city, state
Non-conference regular season
November 4, 2024*; 7:30 pm, FloHoops/MSG2		at Hofstra	W 63–58	1–0	Mack Sports Complex (1,543); Hempstead, NY
November 7, 2024*; 6:00 pm, ACCNX		at Boston College	L 58–102	1–1	Conte Forum (537); Chestnut Hill, MA
November 13, 2024*; 6:00 pm, ESPN+		at NJIT	L 52–73	1–2	Wellness and Events Center (385); Newark, NJ
November 16, 2024*; 2:00 pm, ESPN+		at Albany	L 49–61	1–3	Broadview Center (1,231); Albany, NY
November 21, 2024*; 5:30 pm, ESPN+		Monmouth	W 63–56	2–3	William H. Pitt Center (1,686); Fairfield, CT
November 24, 2024*; 2:00 pm, ESPN+		Coppin State	L 47–59	2–4	William H. Pitt Center (922); Fairfield, CT
December 5, 2024*; 7:00 pm, ESPN+		Morgan State	W 79–57	3–4	William H. Pitt Center (582); Fairfield, CT
December 9, 2024*; 7:00 pm, FloHoops		at Seton Hall	L 46–67	3–5	Walsh Gymnasium (1,064); South Orange, NJ
December 14, 2024*; 2:00 pm, ESPN+		Post	W 63–46	4–5	William H. Pitt Center (511); Fairfield, CT
MAAC regular season
December 19, 2024; 6:00 pm, ESPN+		at Iona	L 44–58	4–6 (0–1)	Hynes Athletics Center (776); New Rochelle, NY
December 21, 2024; 2:00 pm, ESPN+		Quinnipiac	L 63–78	4–7 (0–2)	William H. Pitt Center (708); Fairfield, CT
January 4, 2025; 1:00 pm, ESPN+		at Canisius	W 70–63	5–7 (1–2)	Koessler Athletic Center (466); Buffalo, NY
January 9, 2025; 7:00 pm, ESPN+		at Merrimack	L 53–64	5–8 (1–3)	Hammel Court; North Andover, MA
January 11, 2025; 12:00 pm, ESPN+		Mount St. Mary's	L 51–75	5–9 (1–4)	William H. Pitt Center (586); Fairfield, CT
January 16, 2025; 7:00 pm, ESPN+		Siena	L 59–79	5–10 (1–5)	William H. Pitt Center (641); Fairfield, CT
January 18, 2025; 2:00 pm, ESPN+		at Saint Peter's	L 53–56	5–11 (1–6)	Run Baby Run Arena (262); Jersey City, NJ
January 23, 2025; 7:00 pm, ESPN+		Canisius	L 53–67	5–12 (1–7)	William H. Pitt Center (555); Fairfield, CT
January 25, 2025; 12:00 pm, ESPN+		Niagara	W 86–43	6–12 (2–7)	William H. Pitt Center (925); Fairfield, CT
February 1, 2025; 2:00 pm, ESPN+		at Manhattan	L 58–64 ^{OT}	6–13 (2–8)	Draddy Gymnasium (157); Riverdale, NY
February 6, 2025; 6:00 pm, ESPN+		at Rider	L 57–72	6–14 (2–9)	Alumni Gymnasium (424); Lawrenceville, NJ
February 8, 2025; 2:00 pm, ESPN+		Fairfield	L 76–82	6–15 (2–10)	William H. Pitt Center (810); Fairfield, CT
February 13, 2025; 6:00 pm, ESPN+		at Quinnipiac	L 47–71	6–16 (2–11)	M&T Bank Arena (412); Hamden, CT
February 15, 2025; 6:00 pm, ESPN+		at Siena	L 51–66	6–17 (2–12)	UHY Center (663); Loudonville, NY
February 20, 2025; 7:00 pm, ESPN+		Merrimack	W 74–48	7–17 (3–12)	William H. Pitt Center (620); Fairfield, CT
February 22, 2025; 2:00 pm, ESPN+		Saint Peter's	L 44–54	7–18 (3–13)	William H. Pitt Center (624); Fairfield, CT
February 27, 2025; 7:00 pm, ESPN+		at Marist	L 61–68	7–19 (3–14)	McCann Arena (801); Poughkeepsie, NY
March 1, 2025; 7:00 pm, ESPN+		at Fairfield	L 58–69	7–20 (3–15)	Leo D. Mahoney Arena (1,855); Fairfield, CT
March 6, 2025; 7:00 pm, ESPN+		Manhattan	W 61–50	7–21 (3–16)	William H. Pitt Center (502); Fairfield, CT
March 8, 2025; 2:00 pm, ESPN+		Iona	W 69–57	8–21 (4–16)	William H. Pitt Center (732); Fairfield, CT
*Non-conference game. ^{#}Rankings from AP Poll. (#) Tournament seedings in parentheses. All times are in Eastern.
