= 2024–25 Manhattan Jaspers women's basketball team =

American college basketball season

2024–25 Manhattan Jaspers women's basketball
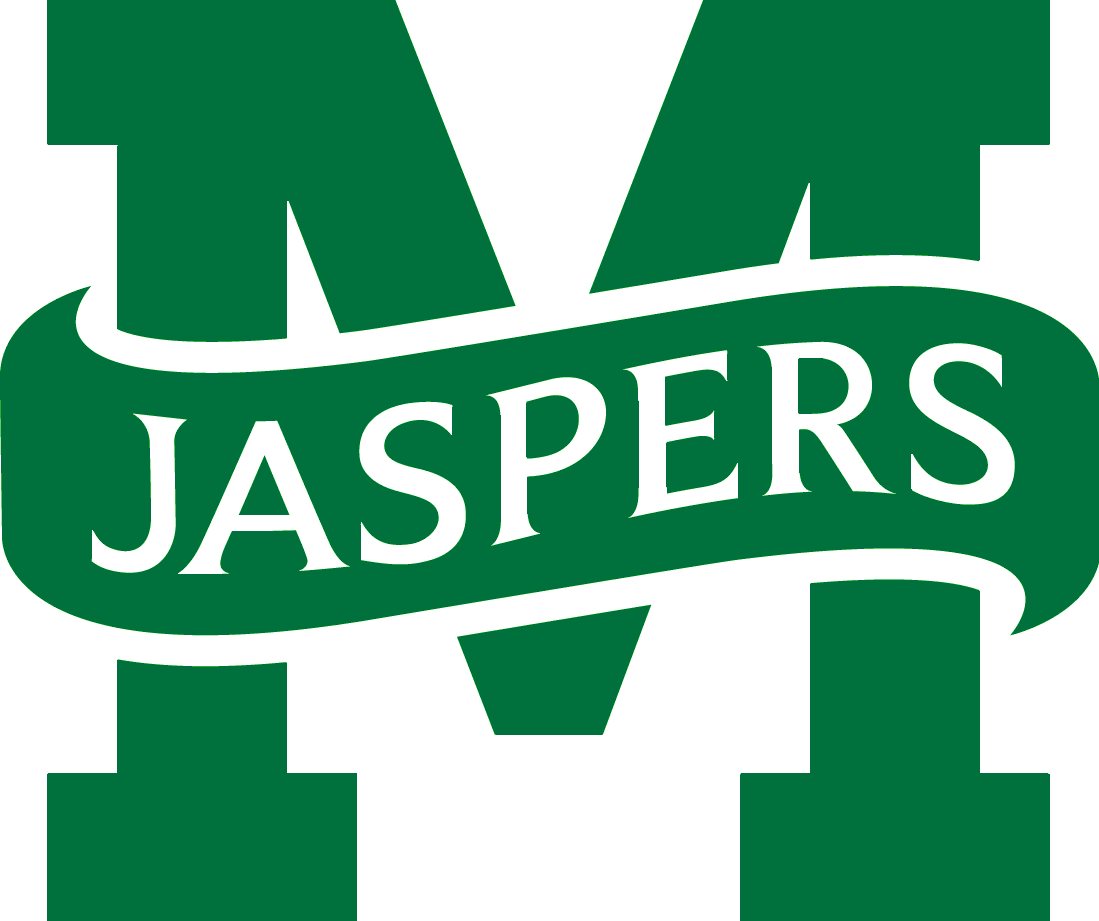
- Conference: Metro Atlantic Athletic Conference
- Record: 16–15 (9–11 MAAC)
- Head coach: Heather Vulin (9th season)
- Associate head coach: Callan Stores
- Assistant coaches: Phyllis Mangina; Sara Mitchell
- Home arena: Draddy Gymnasium

2024–25 MAAC women's basketball standings
	Conf.				Overall
Team	W		L	PCT	W		L	PCT
Fairfield †	19	–	1	.950	28	–	5	.848
Quinnipiac	18	–	2	.900	28	–	5	.848
Siena	14	–	6	.700	17	–	14	.548
Mount St. Mary's	12	–	8	.600	15	–	16	.484
Marist	11	–	9	.550	16	–	15	.516
Merrimack	9	–	11	.450	14	–	17	.452
Saint Peter's	9	–	11	.450	11	–	19	.367
Manhattan	9	–	11	.450	16	–	15	.516
Canisius	9	–	11	.450	10	–	21	.323
Iona	8	–	12	.400	11	–	21	.344
Rider	5	–	15	.250	7	–	22	.241
Sacred Heart	5	–	15	.250	9	–	20	.310
Niagara	2	–	18	.100	3	–	25	.107
† 2025 MAAC tournament winner

The 2024–25 Manhattan Jaspers women's basketball team represented Manhattan University during the 2024–25 NCAA Division I women's basketball season. The Jaspers, led by ninth-year head coach Heather Vulin, played their home games at Draddy Gymnasium in Riverdale, New York as members of the Metro Atlantic Athletic Conference (MAAC).

The Jaspers finished the season 16–15, 9–11 in MAAC play, to finish in a four-way tie for sixth place. In the MAAC tournament, they defeated ninth seed Canisius in the first round before being eliminated by top-seeded Fairfield in the quarterfinals.

== Previous season ==
The Jaspers finished the 2023–24 season 18–11, 11–9 in MAAC play, to finish in a tie for fourth place. They were defeated by fifth-seeded Canisius in the quarterfinals of the MAAC tournament.

== Roster ==
2024–25 Manhattan Jaspers women's basketball team
Players
Coaches

Pos.	#	Name	Height	Year	Previous school	Hometown
G	0	Brianna Davis	5 ft 8 in (1.73 m)	Jr	Queens College	The Bronx, NY
G	1	Hana Mühl	5 ft 8 in (1.73 m)	Jr	Ball State	Zagreb, Croatia
F	4	Tegan Young	6 ft 1 in (1.85 m)	So	Lawrence Academy	Leominster, MA
G	5	Claudia Jimenez	5 ft 8 in (1.73 m)	Fr	CBS Femenino	Seville, Spain
F	6	Kristina Juric	6 ft 2 in (1.88 m)	So	Kušlanova Gymnasium	Zagreb, Croatia
F	9	Leyla Öztürk	6 ft 1 in (1.85 m)	GS	Northeastern	Berlin, Germany
G	10	Alyssa Costigan	6 ft 0 in (1.83 m)	Jr	Paul VI High School	Herndon, VA
G	13	Ella Chandler	6 ft 0 in (1.83 m)	Fr	Wilbraham & Monson Academy	Ballston Lake, NY
F	14	Alexis Rosenfeld	6 ft 2 in (1.88 m)	Fr	Morris Catholic High School	Ridgewood, NJ
F	15	Caroline de Klauman	6 ft 2 in (1.88 m)	Sr	Winthrop	Gentofte, Denmark
G	21	Nitzan Amar	5 ft 10 in (1.78 m)	Sr	UNC Greensboro	Yir'on, Israel
G/F	23	Inés Giménez Monserrat	5 ft 10 in (1.78 m)	Sr	Franklin Pierce	Mallorca, Spain
F	25	Petra Juric	6 ft 2 in (1.88 m)	Sr	III Gymnasium Osijek	Zagreb, Croatia

Head coach

- Heather Vulin (Minnesota Morris)

Assistant coach(es)

- Callan Stores (Sacred Heart)
- Phyllis Mangina (Seton Hall)
- Sara Mitchell (King)

Legend

- (C) Team captain
- (S) Suspended
- (I) Ineligible
- (W) Walk-on
- Injured
- Current redshirt

Roster
Last update: February 22, 2025

== Schedule and results ==
Date time, TV	Rank^{#}	Opponent^{#}	Result	Record	Site (attendance) city, state
Non-conference regular season
November 4, 2024*; 7:00 p.m., B1G+		at Rutgers	L 79–85	0–1	Jersey Mike's Arena (1,517); Piscataway, NJ
November 7, 2024*; 7:00 p.m., NEC Front Row		at Central Connecticut	W 78–64	1–1	William H. Detrick Gymnasium (2,094); New Britain, CT
November 14, 2024*; 7:00 p.m., ESPN+		LIU	W 73–50	2–1	Draddy Gymnasium (313); Riverdale, NY
November 17, 2024*; 5:00 p.m., ESPN+		Hofstra	W 62–49	3–1	Draddy Gymnasium (174); Riverdale, NY
November 20, 2024*; 7:00 p.m., ESPN+		Fordham; Battle of the Bronx	W 65–58	4–1	Draddy Gymnasium (800); Riverdale, NY
November 24, 2024*; 4:00 p.m., ESPN+		at UMBC	W 60–50	5–1	Chesapeake Employers Insurance Arena (452); Catonsville, MD
November 29, 2024*; 2:00 p.m., ESPN+		at Florida Atlantic; FAU Thanksgiving Classic	L 50–65	5–2	Eleanor R. Baldwin Arena (524); Boca Raton, FL
November 30, 2024*; 1:00 p.m., FloHoops		vs. Austin Peay; FAU Thanksgiving Classic	W 61–46	6–2	Eleanor R. Baldwin Arena (264); Boca Raton, FL
December 7, 2024*; 12:00 p.m., ESPN+		at Vermont	L 57–74	6–3	Patrick Gym (915); Burlington, VT
MAAC regular season
December 19, 2024; 11:00 a.m., ESPN+		Saint Peter's	L 49–62	6–4 (0–1)	Draddy Gymnasium (1,604); Riverdale, NY
December 21, 2024; 7:00 p.m., ESPN+		at Marist	L 51–58	6–5 (0–2)	McCann Arena (807); Poughkeepsie, NY
January 2, 2025; 7:00 p.m., ESPN+		Siena	L 60–62	6–6 (0–3)	Draddy Gymnasium (164); Riverdale, NY
January 4, 2025; 2:00 p.m., ESPN+		Rider	W 81–40	7–6 (1–3)	Draddy Gymnasium (220); Riverdale, NY
January 9, 2025; 7:00 p.m., ESPN+		at Mount St. Mary's	W 75–47	8–6 (2–3)	Knott Arena (212); Emmitsburg, MD
January 11, 2025; 2:00 p.m., ESPN+		Merrimack	W 77–61	9–6 (3–3)	Draddy Gymnasium (271); Riverdale, NY
January 18, 2025; 1:00 p.m., ESPN+		at Niagara	W 79–54	10–6 (4–3)	Gallagher Center (309); Lewiston, NY
January 23, 2025; 11:00 a.m., ESPN+		at Fairfield	L 44–69	10–7 (4–4)	Leo D. Mahoney Arena (3,573); Fairfield, CT
January 25, 2025; 2:00 p.m., ESPN+		Mount St. Mary's	L 66–80	10–8 (4–5)	Draddy Gymnasium (220); Riverdale, NY
January 30, 2025; 6:00 p.m., ESPN+		at Iona	L 47–64	10–9 (4–6)	Hynes Athletics Center (1,080); New Rochelle, NY
February 1, 2025; 2:00 p.m., ESPN+		Sacred Heart	W 64–58 ^{OT}	11–9 (5–6)	Draddy Gymnasium (157); Riverdale, NY
February 8, 2025; 2:00 p.m., ESPN+		at Saint Peter's	L 52–58	11–10 (5–7)	Run Baby Run Arena (192); Jersey City, NJ
February 13, 2025; 7:00 p.m., ESPN+		at Merrimack	L 69–71	11–11 (5–8)	Lawler Arena (263); North Andover, MA
February 15, 2025; 2:00 p.m., ESPN+		Fairfield	L 45–84	11–12 (5–9)	Draddy Gymnasium (205); Riverdale, NY
February 20, 2025; 7:00 p.m., ESPN+		Iona	W 68–65	12–12 (6–9)	Draddy Gymnasium (162); Riverdale, NY
February 22, 2025; 2:00 p.m., ESPN+		at Quinnipiac	L 40–60	12–13 (6–10)	M&T Bank Arena (702); Hamden, CT
February 27, 2025; 7:00 p.m., ESPN+		Canisius	W 71–35	13–13 (7–10)	Draddy Gymnasium (204); Riverdale, NY
March 1, 2025; 2:00 p.m., ESPN+		Niagara	W 72–52	14–13 (8–10)	Draddy Gymnasium (187); Riverdale, NY
March 6, 2025; 7:00 p.m., ESPN+		at Sacred Heart	L 50–61	14–14 (8–11)	William H. Pitt Center (502); Fairfield, CT
March 8, 2025; 2:00 p.m., ESPN+		at Siena	W 62–43	15–14 (9–11)	UHY Center (824); Loudonville, NY
MAAC tournament
March 11, 2025; 12:00 p.m., ESPN+	(8)	vs. (9) Canisius; First round	W 52–42	16–14	Boardwalk Hall; Atlantic City, NJ
March 12, 2025; 12:00 p.m., ESPN+	(8)	vs. (1) Fairfield; Quarterfinals	L 51–58	16–15	Boardwalk Hall (1,057); Atlantic City, NJ
*Non-conference game. ^{#}Rankings from AP poll. (#) Tournament seedings in parentheses. All times are in Eastern.
