= 2024–25 Siena Saints women's basketball team =

American college basketball season

2024–25 Siena Saints women's basketball

WNIT, First Round
- Conference: Metro Atlantic Athletic Conference
- Record: 17–14 (14–6 MAAC)
- Head coach: Terry Primm (1st season)
- Assistant coaches: Heather Stec; Sydnie Rosales; Billy Lovett
- Home arena: UHY Center

2024–25 MAAC women's basketball standings
	Conf.				Overall
Team	W		L	PCT	W		L	PCT
Fairfield †	19	–	1	.950	28	–	5	.848
Quinnipiac	18	–	2	.900	28	–	5	.848
Siena	14	–	6	.700	17	–	14	.548
Mount St. Mary's	12	–	8	.600	15	–	16	.484
Marist	11	–	9	.550	16	–	15	.516
Merrimack	9	–	11	.450	14	–	17	.452
Saint Peter's	9	–	11	.450	11	–	19	.367
Manhattan	9	–	11	.450	16	–	15	.516
Canisius	9	–	11	.450	10	–	21	.323
Iona	8	–	12	.400	11	–	21	.344
Rider	5	–	15	.250	7	–	22	.241
Sacred Heart	5	–	15	.250	9	–	20	.310
Niagara	2	–	18	.100	3	–	25	.107
† 2025 MAAC tournament winner

The 2024–25 Siena Saints women's basketball team represented Siena College during the 2024–25 NCAA Division I women's basketball season. The Saints, led by first-year head coach Terry Primm, played their home games at the UHY Center in Loudonville, New York, as members of the Metro Atlantic Athletic Conference.

== Previous season ==
The Saints finished the 2023–24 season 18–12, 14–6 in MAAC play, to finish in third place. They defeated Mount St. Mary's, before falling to Niagara in the semifinals of the MAAC tournament.

On March 26, 2024, head coach Jim Jabir announced that he would be retiring, ending his second stint with the team, and six seasons overall. On April 5, the school announced that they would be elevating assistant coach Terry Primm to be the team's next head coach.

== Roster ==
2024–25 Siena Saints women's basketball team
Players
Coaches

Pos.	#	Name	Height	Year	Previous school	Hometown
G	0	Ahniysha Jackson	5 ft 7 in (1.7 m)	GS	Albany	Watervliet, New York
G	2	Aniya Hooker	5 ft 8 in (1.73 m)	Fr	Lynnwood High School	Lynnwood, Washington
G	3	Myriam Traore	6 ft 2 in (1.88 m)	Fr	Lycée Jean Mermoz	Lognes, France
G	4	Valencia Fontenelle-Posson	5 ft 10 in (1.78 m)	GS	Guilderland High School	Guilderland, New York
G	7	Teresa Seppala	6 ft 0 in (1.83 m)	Jr	Mäkelänrinteen lukio	Tampere, Finland
G	10	Ana Conde	6 ft 0 in (1.83 m)	Fr	IES Excelencia	Madrid, Spain
G	12	Alden Yergey	5 ft 9 in (1.75 m)	So	Brentsville District High School	Nokesville, Virginia
G	13	KB Hadley	5 ft 5 in (1.65 m)	Jr	College of Southern Nevada	Palmdale, California
G	15	Zyriah Price	6 ft 0 in (1.83 m)	Fr	Hazel Green High School	Huntsville, Alabama
G	21	Anajah Brown	6 ft 1 in (1.85 m)	Sr	The Baldwin School	Norristown, Pennsylvania
G	25	Eszter Turi	6 ft 1 in (1.85 m)	So	Hunfalvy Janos Bilingual Secondary School	Budapest, Hungary
G	30	Allison O'Hanlon	5 ft 8 in (1.73 m)	Fr	Duanesburg High School	Duanesburg, New York
G	33	Zoe Richardson	6 ft 1 in (1.85 m)	Fr	Hoosac School	Auckland, New Zealand
G	54	Peppi Lohko	6 ft 2 in (1.88 m)	Fr	Mäkelänrinteen Lukio	Lahti, Finland

Head coach

- Terry Primm (Palm Beach Atlantic)

Assistant coach(es)

- Heather Stec (Siena)
- Sydnie Rosales (Marist)
- Billy Lovett (Fordham)

Legend

- (C) Team captain
- (S) Suspended
- (I) Ineligible
- (W) Walk-on
- Injured
- Current redshirt

Roster
Last update: February 18, 2025

== Schedule and results ==
Date time, TV	Rank^{#}	Opponent^{#}	Result	Record	Site (attendance) city, state
Ireland Tour
August 9, 2024*; 2:00 pm		at Gurranabraher Credit Union Brunell	W 77–57	–	Neptune Stadium; Cork, Ireland
August 11, 2024*; 2:00 pm		at Killester Basketball Club	Canceled		IWA Sports Hall; Dublin, Ireland
August 13, 2024*; 3:30 pm		at Liffey Celtics	W 83–61	–	Leixlip Amenities Centre; Kildare, Ireland
Exhibition
November 1, 2024*; 6:00 pm, ESPN+		American International	W 80–48	–	UHY Center (626); Loudonville, NY
Regular season
November 6, 2024*; 6:00 pm, ESPN+		Army	L 56–66	0–1	UHY Center (864); Loudonville, NY
November 10, 2024*; 5:00 pm, B1G+		at Washington	L 51–94	0–2	Alaska Airlines Arena (2,137); Seattle, WA
November 13, 2024*; 6:00 pm, ESPN+		at Penn	L 47–78	0–3	The Palestra (329); Philadelphia, PA
November 23, 2024*; 7:30 pm, ESPN+		at Fordham	L 51–90	0–4	Rose Hill Gymnasium (321); Bronx, NY
November 26, 2024*; 4:00 pm, NEC Front Row		at Central Connecticut	W 87–50	1–4	William H. Detrick Gymnasium (208); New Britain, CT
December 1, 2024*; 2:00 pm, ESPN+		UMass	W 57–53	2–4	UHY Center (652); Loudonville, NY
December 7, 2024*; 2:00 pm, ESPN+		Albany; Albany Cup	W 70–65	3–4	UHY Center (1,283); Loudonville, NY
December 15, 2024*; 2:00 pm, ESPN+		Binghamton	L 62–64	3–5	UHY Center (503); Loudonville, NY
December 19, 2024; 6:00 pm, ESPN+		Niagara	W 65–57	4–5 (1–0)	UHY Center (323); Loudonville, NY
December 21, 2024; 2:00 pm, ESPN+		Canisius	W 67–61	5–5 (2–0)	UHY Center (462); Loudonville, NY
December 30, 2024*; 6:00 pm, ESPN+		Cornell	L 73–76	5–6	UHY Center (434); Loudonville, NY
January 2, 2025; 7:00 pm, ESPN+		at Manhattan	W 62–60	6–6 (3–0)	Draddy Gymnasium (164); Riverdale, NY
January 4, 2025; 1:00 pm, ESPN+		at Iona	L 75–82	6–7 (3–1)	Hynes Athletics Center (976); New Rochelle, NY
January 9, 2025; 11:00 am, ESPN+		Quinnipiac	L 51–69	6–8 (3–2)	UHY Center (2,148); Loudonville, NY
January 16, 2025; 7:00 pm, ESPN+		at Sacred Heart	W 79–59	7–8 (4–2)	William H. Pitt Center (641); Fairfield, CT
January 18, 2025; 2:00 pm, ESPN+		Merrimack	W 79–57	8–8 (5–2)	UHY Center (418); Loudonville, NY
January 23, 2025; 7:00 pm, ESPN+		at Mount St. Mary's	L 57–92	8–9 (5–3)	Knott Arena (411); Emmitsburg, MD
January 25, 2025; 2:00 pm, ESPN+		Iona	W 79–68	9–9 (6–3)	UHY Center (740); Loudonville, NY
January 30, 2025; 6:00 pm, ESPN+		Marist	W 62–46	10–9 (7–3)	UHY Center (808); Loudonville, NY
February 1, 2025; 2:00 pm, ESPN+		at Quinnipiac	L 74–77	10–10 (7–4)	M&T Bank Arena (624); Hamden, CT
February 6, 2025; 7:00 pm, ESPN+		at Saint Peter's	W 68–60	11–10 (8–4)	Yanitelli Center (392); Jersey City, NJ
February 8, 2025; 2:00 pm, ESPN+		Rider	W 68–49	12–10 (9–4)	UHY Center (699); Loudonville, NY
February 13, 2025; 7:00 pm, ESPN+		at Marist	W 81–69	13–10 (10–4)	McCann Arena (772); Poughkeepsie, NY
February 15, 2025; 6:00 pm, ESPN+		Sacred Heart	W 66–51	14–10 (11–4)	UHY Center (663); Loudonville, NY
February 20, 2025; 6:00 pm, ESPN+		at Niagara	W 66–64	15–10 (12–4)	Gallagher Center (360); Lewiston, NY
February 22, 2025; 1:00 pm, ESPN+		at Canisius	W 72–58	16–10 (13–4)	Koessler Athletic Center (492); Buffalo, NY
March 1, 2025; 2:00 pm, ESPN+		Mount St. Mary's	W 52–49	17–10 (14–4)	UHY Center (545); Loudonville, NY
March 6, 2025; 7:00 pm, ESPNU		at Fairfield	L 49–62	17–11 (14–5)	Leo D. Mahoney Arena (838); Fairfield, CT
March 8, 2025; 2:00 pm, ESPN+		Manhattan	L 43–62	17–12 (14–6)	UHY Center (824); Loudonville, NY
MAAC tournament
March 13, 2025; 2:30 pm, ESPN+	(3)	vs. (6) Merrimack; Quarterfinals	L 72–79	17–13	Boardwalk Hall; Atlantic City, NJ
WNIT
March 21, 2025*; 7:00 pm, ESPN+		at Howard; Round 1	L 62–72	17–14	Burr Gymnasium (1,030); Washington, D.C.
*Non-conference game. ^{#}Rankings from AP Poll. (#) Tournament seedings in parentheses. All times are in Eastern.
