= 2024–25 Saint Peter's Peacocks women's basketball team =

American college basketball season

2024–25 Saint Peter's Peacocks women's basketball
- Conference: Metro Atlantic Athletic Conference
- Record: 9–15 (7–8 MAAC)
- Head coach: Jennifer Leedham (3rd season)
- Associate head coach: David Jollon
- Assistant coaches: Johannah Leedham-Warner; Tay Hughes; Olivia Tucker
- Home arena: Run Baby Run Arena

2024–25 MAAC women's basketball standings
| | Conf. | | | | Overall |
| Team | W | | L | PCT | W | | L | PCT |
|---|---|---|---|---|---|---|---|---|
| Fairfield † | 19 | – | 1 | .950 | 28 | – | 5 | .848 |
| Quinnipiac | 18 | – | 2 | .900 | 28 | – | 5 | .848 |
| Siena | 14 | – | 6 | .700 | 17 | – | 14 | .548 |
| Mount St. Mary's | 12 | – | 8 | .600 | 15 | – | 16 | .484 |
| Marist | 11 | – | 9 | .550 | 16 | – | 15 | .516 |
| Merrimack | 9 | – | 11 | .450 | 14 | – | 17 | .452 |
| Saint Peter's | 9 | – | 11 | .450 | 11 | – | 19 | .367 |
| Manhattan | 9 | – | 11 | .450 | 16 | – | 15 | .516 |
| Canisius | 9 | – | 11 | .450 | 10 | – | 21 | .323 |
| Iona | 8 | – | 12 | .400 | 11 | – | 21 | .344 |
| Rider | 5 | – | 15 | .250 | 7 | – | 22 | .241 |
| Sacred Heart | 5 | – | 15 | .250 | 9 | – | 20 | .310 |
| Niagara | 2 | – | 18 | .100 | 3 | – | 25 | .107 |
† 2025 MAAC tournament winner

The 2024–25 Saint Peter's Peacocks women's basketball team represented Saint Peter's University during the 2024–25 NCAA Division I women's basketball season. The Peacocks, led by third-year head coach Jennifer Leedham, played their home games at the Run Baby Run Arena in Jersey City, New Jersey, as members of the Metro Atlantic Athletic Conference.

== Previous season ==
The Peacocks finished the 2023–24 season 7–23, 4–16 in MAAC play, to finish in a tie for last place. They were defeated by Quinnipiac in the first round of the MAAC tournament.

== Roster ==
2024–25 Saint Peter's Peacocks women's basketball team
Players
Coaches

| Pos. | # | Name | Height | Year | Previous school | Hometown |
|---|---|---|---|---|---|---|
| G/F | 0 | Laila Grant | 5 ft 8 in (1.73 m) | GS | Presbyterian | Derwood, MD |
| G/F | 1 | Nikola Zdenkova | 5 ft 9 in (1.75 m) | RS So | Siena | Karlovy Vary, Czechia |
| G/F | 2 | Iyanna Cotten | 5 ft 7 in (1.7 m) | Fr | Franklin High School | Somerset, NJ |
| G | 3 | Louella Allana | 5 ft 4 in (1.63 m) | Jr | Robert Morris | Laval, QC |
| G/F | 5 | Maya Hyacienth | 5 ft 9 in (1.75 m) | GS | Rider | Nottingham, England |
| F | 6 | Maria Andorinho | 6 ft 1 in (1.85 m) | Fr | Instituto Español Giner de los Ríos | Cruz Quebrada, Portugal |
| G/F | 7 | Jineen Ayyash | 5 ft 10 in (1.78 m) | Fr | Ocean Township High School | Ocean, NJ |
| G | 12 | Emily O'Connell | 5 ft 7 in (1.7 m) | So | City of London Academy | London, England |
| F | 13 | De'Naya Rippey | 5 ft 10 in (1.78 m) | Fr | Cheshire Academy | Brooklyn, NY |
| C | 14 | Carys Roy | 6 ft 3 in (1.91 m) | So | Cowbridge Comprehensive School | Cowbridge, Wales |
| F | 15 | Layla Laws | 6 ft 1 in (1.85 m) | Sr | Saint Francis (PA) | Pine Beach, NJ |
| G | 20 | Reilly Sunday | 5 ft 9 in (1.75 m) | Jr | Moon Area High School | Moon Township, PA |
| G/F | 23 | Lara Aguzzi | 5 ft 9 in (1.75 m) | So | Newton North High School | Newton, MA |
| F | 25 | Linda Amaning | 6 ft 3 in (1.91 m) | Fr | Marguerite De Flandre | Dijon, France |
| F | 44 | Fatmata Janneh | 6 ft 2 in (1.88 m) | So | Barking Abbey Sixth Form | London, England |

Head coach

- Jennifer Leedham (Franklin Pierce)

Assistant coach(es)

- David Jollon (Thomas Edison State)
- Johannah Leedham-Warner (Franklin Pierce)
- Tay Hughes (Saint Peter's)
- Olivia Tucker (Sacred Heart)

Legend

- (C) Team captain
- (S) Suspended
- (I) Ineligible
- (W) Walk-on
- Injured
- Current redshirt

Roster
Last update: February 21, 2025

== Schedule and results ==
| Date time, TV | Rank^{#} | Opponent^{#} | Result | Record | Site (attendance) city, state |
Non-conference regular season
| November 4, 2024*; 2:00 pm, FloHoops | | at St. John's | L 39–80 | 0–1 | Carnesecca Arena (446); Queens, NY |
| November 9, 2024*; 1:00 pm, ESPN+ | | at Army | L 42–64 | 0–2 | Christl Arena (588); West Point, NY |
| November 15, 2024*; 7:00 pm, ESPN+ | | at Fordham | L 56–64 | 0–3 | Rose Hill Gymnasium (204); Bronx, NY |
| November 20, 2024*; 7:00 pm, ESPN+ | | at James Madison | L 32–73 | 0–4 | Atlantic Union Bank Center (2,518); Harrisonburg, VA |
| November 23, 2024*; 12:00 pm, YES | | at Fairleigh Dickinson | L 50–67 | 0–5 | Bogota Savings Bank Center (185); Hackensack, NJ |
| November 26, 2024*; 4:00 pm, FloHoops | | at Monmouth | L 50–59 | 0–6 | OceanFirst Bank Center (596); West Long Branch, NJ |
| December 1, 2024*; 2:00 pm, ESPN+ | | NJIT | W 65–60 | 1–6 | Run Baby Run Arena (225); Jersey City, NJ |
| December 8, 2024*; 1:00 pm, ACCNX | | at Pittsburgh | L 51–59 | 1–7 | Petersen Events Center (128); Pittsburgh, PA |
| December 11, 2024*; 2:00 pm, ESPN+ | | LIU | W 51–37 | 2–7 | Run Baby Run Arena (268); Jersey City, NJ |
MAAC regular season
| December 19, 2024; 11:00 am, ESPN+ | | at Manhattan | W 62–49 | 3–7 (1–0) | Draddy Gymnasium (1,604); Riverdale, NY |
| December 21, 2024; 2:00 pm, ESPN+ | | Iona | L 50–56 | 3–8 (1–1) | Run Baby Run Arena (302); Jersey City, NJ |
| January 2, 2025; 6:00 pm, ESPN+ | | at Quinnipiac | L 39–54 | 3–9 (1–2) | M&T Bank Arena (355); Hamden, CT |
| January 9, 2025; 7:00 pm, ESPN+ | | Niagara | W 80–50 | 4–9 (2–2) | Run Baby Run Arena (237); Jersey City, NJ |
| January 11, 2025; 2:00 pm, ESPN+ | | Canisius | W 61–55 | 5–9 (3–2) | Run Baby Run Arena (125); Jersey City, NJ |
| January 16, 2025; 11:00 am, ESPN+ | | at Marist | L 30–50 | 5–10 (3–3) | McCann Arena (1,814); Poughkeepsie, NY |
| January 18, 2025; 2:00 pm, ESPN+ | | Sacred Heart | W 56–53 | 6–10 (4–3) | Run Baby Run Arena (262); Jersey City, NJ |
| January 23, 2025; 7:00 pm, ESPN+ | | at Merrimack | L 49–64 | 6–11 (4–4) | Lawler Arena (316); North Andover, MA |
| January 30, 2025; 7:00 pm, ESPN+ | | Rider | L 52–57 | 6–12 (4–5) | Run Baby Run Arena (298); Jersey City, NJ |
| February 1, 2025; 2:00 pm, ESPN+ | | at Mount St. Mary's | L 59–79 | 6–13 (4–6) | Knott Arena (611); Emmitsburg, MD |
| February 6, 2025; 7:00 pm, ESPN+ | | Siena | L 60–68 | 6–14 (4–7) | Run Baby Run Arena (392); Jersey City, NJ |
| February 8, 2025; 2:00 pm, ESPN+ | | Manhattan | W 58–52 | 7–14 (5–7) | Run Baby Run Arena (192); Jersey City, NJ |
| February 13, 2025; 7:00 pm, ESPN+ | | at Fairfield | L 43–73 | 7–15 (5–8) | Leo D. Mahoney Arena (635); Fairfield, CT |
| February 15, 2025; 1:00 pm, ESPN+ | | at Rider | W 55–54 | 8–15 (6–8) | Alumni Gymnasium (784); Lawrenceville, NJ |
| February 20, 2025; 7:00 pm, ESPN+ | | Mount St. Mary's | W 70–54 | 9–15 (7–8) | Run Baby Run Arena (150); Jersey City, NJ |
| February 22, 2025; 2:00 pm, ESPN+ | | at Sacred Heart | W 54–44 | 10–15 (8–8) | William H. Pitt Center (624); Fairfield, CT |
| February 27, 2025; 7:00 pm, ESPN+ | | Quinnipiac | L 65–74 | 10–16 (8–9) | Run Baby Run Arena (376); Jersey City, NJ |
| March 1, 2025; 2:00 pm, ESPN+ | | Marist | L 61–63 | 10–17 (8–10) | Run Baby Run Arena (272); Jersey City, NJ |
| March 6, 2025; 6:00 pm, ESPN+ | | at Niagara | W 70–58 | 11–17 (9–10) | Gallagher Center (366); Lewiston, NY |
| March 8, 2025; 1:00 pm, ESPN+ | | at Canisius | L 47–50 | 11–18 (9–11) | Koessler Athletic Center (473); Buffalo, NY |
MAAC tournament
| March 11, 2025; 2:30 pm, ESPN+ | (7) | vs. (10) Iona; First round | L 40–42 | 11–19 | Boardwalk Hall; Atlantic City, NJ |
*Non-conference game. ^{#}Rankings from AP Poll. (#) Tournament seedings in parentheses. All times are in Eastern.
