= 2024–25 Iona Gaels women's basketball team =

American college basketball season

2024–25 Iona Gaels women's basketball
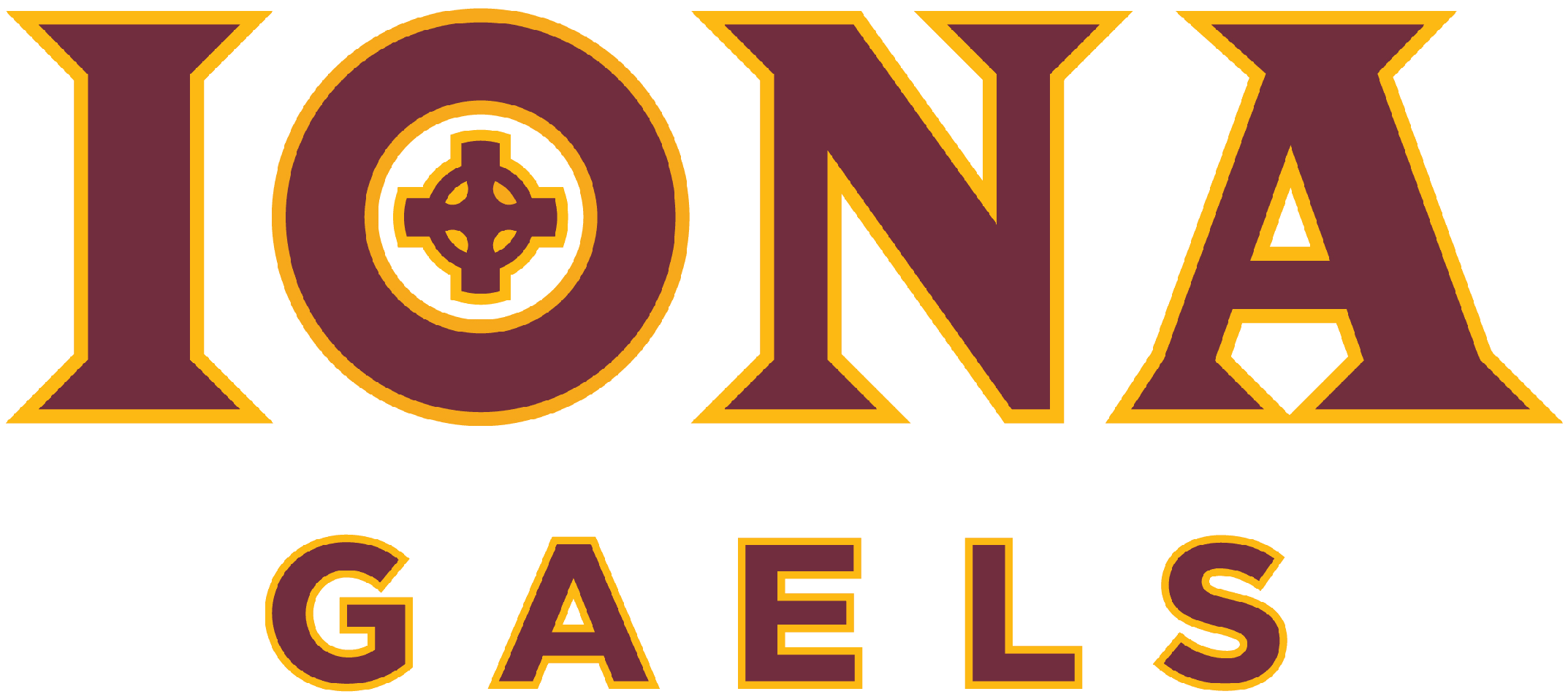
- Conference: Metro Atlantic Athletic Conference
- Record: 10–19 (8–11 MAAC)
- Head coach: Angelika Szumilo (2nd season)
- Assistant coaches: Aaron Gratch; Christian Mordi; Madison Stanley
- Home arena: Hynes Athletics Center

2024–25 MAAC women's basketball standings
	Conf.				Overall
Team	W		L	PCT	W		L	PCT
Fairfield †	19	–	1	.950	28	–	5	.848
Quinnipiac	18	–	2	.900	28	–	5	.848
Siena	14	–	6	.700	17	–	14	.548
Mount St. Mary's	12	–	8	.600	15	–	16	.484
Marist	11	–	9	.550	16	–	15	.516
Merrimack	9	–	11	.450	14	–	17	.452
Saint Peter's	9	–	11	.450	11	–	19	.367
Manhattan	9	–	11	.450	16	–	15	.516
Canisius	9	–	11	.450	10	–	21	.323
Iona	8	–	12	.400	11	–	21	.344
Rider	5	–	15	.250	7	–	22	.241
Sacred Heart	5	–	15	.250	9	–	20	.310
Niagara	2	–	18	.100	3	–	25	.107
† 2025 MAAC tournament winner

The 2024–25 Iona Gaels women's basketball team represented Iona University during the 2024–25 NCAA Division I women's basketball season. The Gaels were led by second-year head coach Angelika Szumilo, and played their home games at the Hynes Athletics Center in New Rochelle, New York as members of the Metro Atlantic Athletic Conference (MAAC).

== Previous season ==
The Gaels finished the 2023–24 season 11–19, 6–14 in MAAC play, to finish in a tie for eighth place. They were defeated by Rider in the first round of the MAAC tournament.

== Roster ==
2024–25 Iona Gaels women's basketball team
Players
Coaches

Pos.	#	Name	Height	Year	Previous school	Hometown
G	1	Chloe Vasquez	5 ft 10 in (1.78 m)	Fr	Pequannock Township High School	Pompton Plains, NJ
G	2	Talia DePetrillo (C)	5 ft 6 in (1.68 m)	Sr	UC Colorado Springs	Dallas, TX
G	3	Nevaeh Stone	5 ft 5 in (1.65 m)	Fr	Monsignor Scanlan High School	The Bronx, NY
G	4	Ale Civera	5 ft 10 in (1.78 m)	Jr	IES Ortega y Gasset	Madrid, Spain
G	5	Ella Fajardo (C)	5 ft 5 in (1.65 m)	Sr	Fairleigh Dickinson	Bergenfield, NJ
G	6	Judith Gomez	5 ft 9 in (1.75 m)	Sr	IES Francesc Macià	Barcelona, Spain
G	10	Adrianna Gonzalez	5 ft 7 in (1.7 m)	Fr	Indian Trail High School	Kenosha, WI
F	11	Taliya Heron	6 ft 0 in (1.83 m)	RS Fr	Bond Academy	Ajax, ON
G	12	Yannie Chan	5 ft 10 in (1.78 m)	Sr	Emmanuel College	Hong Kong
G	14	Mya Zaccagnini (C)	5 ft 5 in (1.65 m)	So	Holy Cross High School	Waterbury, CT
F	20	Destinee Salgado	6 ft 1 in (1.85 m)	Fr	North Stafford High School	Stafford, VA
G	21	Amaya B. Evans	5 ft 5 in (1.65 m)	Jr	Neptune High School	Neptune, NJ
F	30	Zoey Ward	6 ft 0 in (1.83 m)	So	Concord Academy	Gastonia, NC
F	33	Erin Leary	6 ft 0 in (1.83 m)	Sr	St. Thomas Aquinas College	Carle Place, NY
C	43	Ally Carman	6 ft 5 in (1.96 m)	Sr	Boston College	Barnegat, NJ

Head coach

- Angelika Szumilo (LIU Brooklyn)

Assistant coach(es)

- Aaron Gratch (Caldwell)
- Christian Mordi (William Paterson)
- Madison Stanley (Fairleigh Dickinson)

Legend

- (C) Team captain
- (S) Suspended
- (I) Ineligible
- (W) Walk-on
- Injured
- Current redshirt

Roster
Last update: February 18, 2025

== Schedule and results ==
Date time, TV	Rank^{#}	Opponent^{#}	Result	Record	Site (attendance) city, state
Regular season
November 5, 2024*; 7:00 p.m., ESPN+		at UCF	L 44–76	0–1	Addition Financial Arena (812); Orlando, FL
November 12, 2024*; 11:00 a.m., ESPN+		Navy	L 53–55	0–2	Hynes Athletics Center (2,171); New Rochelle, NY
November 15, 2024*; 11:00 a.m., B1G+		at Rutgers	L 53–81	0–3	Jersey Mike's Arena (3,349); Piscataway, NJ
November 20, 2024*; 6:00 p.m., ESPN+		Charleston	L 41–77	0–4	Hynes Athletics Center (1,041); New Rochelle, NY
November 26, 2024*; 6:00 p.m., ESPN+		Wagner	W 70–51	1–4	Hynes Athletics Center (1,138); New Rochelle, NY
November 29, 2024*; 4:00 p.m., YouTube		vs. Akron; Colgate Thanksgiving Tournament	L 51–64	1–5	Cotterell Court (207); Hamilton, NY
November 30, 2024*; 1:00 p.m., YouTube		vs. UMBC; Colgate Thanksgiving Tournament	L 40–62	1–6	Cotterell Court; Hamilton, NY
December 5, 2024*; 6:00 p.m., ESPN+		Stetson	W 58–46	2–6	Hynes Athletics Center (1,068); New Rochelle, NY
December 10, 2024*; 6:00 p.m., ESPN+		at UMass Lowell	L 38–49	2–7	Costello Athletic Center (243); Lowell, MA
December 19, 2024; 6:00 p.m., ESPN+		Sacred Heart	W 58–44	3–7 (1–0)	Hynes Athletics Center (776); New Rochelle, NY
December 21, 2024; 2:00 p.m., ESPN+		at Saint Peter's	W 56–50	4–7 (2–0)	Run Baby Run Arena (302); Jersey City, NJ
December 29, 2024*; 2:00 p.m., FloHoops/MSGSN		at Hofstra	L 43–59	4–8	Mack Sports Complex (702); Hempstead, NY
January 2, 2025; 7:00 p.m., ESPN+		at Marist	W 69–67	5–8 (3–0)	McCann Arena (783); Poughkeepsie, NY
January 4, 2025; 1:00 p.m., ESPN+		Siena	W 82–75	6–8 (4–0)	Hynes Athletics Center (976); New Rochelle, NY
January 9, 2025; 6:00 p.m., ESPN+		Fairfield	L 50–72	6–9 (4–1)	Hynes Athletics Center (969); New Rochelle, NY
January 11, 2025; 2:00 p.m., ESPN+		at Quinnipiac	L 58–66	6–10 (4–2)	M&T Bank Arena (558); Hamden, CT
January 16, 2025; 6:00 p.m., ESPN+		at Canisius	L 63–66	6–11 (4–3)	Koessler Athletic Center (552); Buffalo, NY
January 23, 2025; 11:00 a.m., ESPN+		Rider	W 84–53	7–11 (5–3)	Hynes Athletics Center (1,704); New Rochelle, NY
January 25, 2025; 2:00 p.m., ESPN+		at Siena	L 68–79	7–12 (5–4)	UHY Center (740); Loudonville, NY
January 30, 2025; 6:00 p.m., ESPN+		Manhattan	W 64–47	8–12 (6–4)	Hynes Athletics Center (740); New Rochelle, NY
February 1, 2025; 2:00 p.m., ESPN+		at Fairfield	L 46–63	8–13 (6–5)	Leo D. Mahoney Arena (1,340); Fairfield, CT
February 6, 2025; 6:00 p.m., ESPN+		Mount St. Mary's	W 62–60	9–13 (7–5)	Hynes Athletics Center (932); New Rochelle, NY
February 8, 2025; 1:00 p.m., ESPN+		Marist	L 43–63	9–14 (7–6)	Hynes Athletics Center (1,104); New Rochelle, NY
February 13, 2025; 6:00 p.m., ESPN+		at Rider	W 65–60	10–14 (8–6)	Alumni Gymnasium (436); Lawrenceville, NJ
February 15, 2025; 1:00 p.m., ESPN+		Quinnipiac	L 66–74	10–15 (8–7)	Hynes Athletics Center (1,060); New Rochelle, NY
February 20, 2025; 7:00 p.m., ESPN+		at Manhattan	L 65–68	10–16 (8–8)	Draddy Gymnasium (162); Riverdale, NY
February 22, 2025; 3:00 p.m., ESPN+		at Merrimack	L 36–81	10–17 (8–9)	Hammel Court (418); North Andover, MA
February 27, 2025; 6:00 p.m., ESPN+		Niagara	L 56–61	10–18 (8–10)	Hynes Athletics Center (799); New Rochelle, NY
March 1, 2025; 1:00 p.m., ESPN+		Canisius	L 48–53	10–19 (8–11)	Hynes Athletics Center (1,075); New Rochelle, NY
March 8, 2025; 2:00 p.m., ESPN+		at Sacred Heart	L 57–69	10–20 (8–12)	William H. Pitt Center (732); Fairfield, CT
MAAC tournament
March 11, 2025; 2:30 p.m., ESPN+	(10)	vs. (7) Saint Peter's; First round	W 42–40	11–20	Boardwalk Hall; Atlantic City, NJ
March 12, 2025; 2:30 p.m., ESPN+	(10)	vs. (2) Quinnipiac; Quarterfinals			Boardwalk Hall; Atlantic City, NJ
*Non-conference game. ^{#}Rankings from AP poll. (#) Tournament seedings in parentheses. All times are in Eastern.
