= 2024–25 Rider Broncs women's basketball team =

American college basketball season

2024–25 Rider Broncs women's basketball
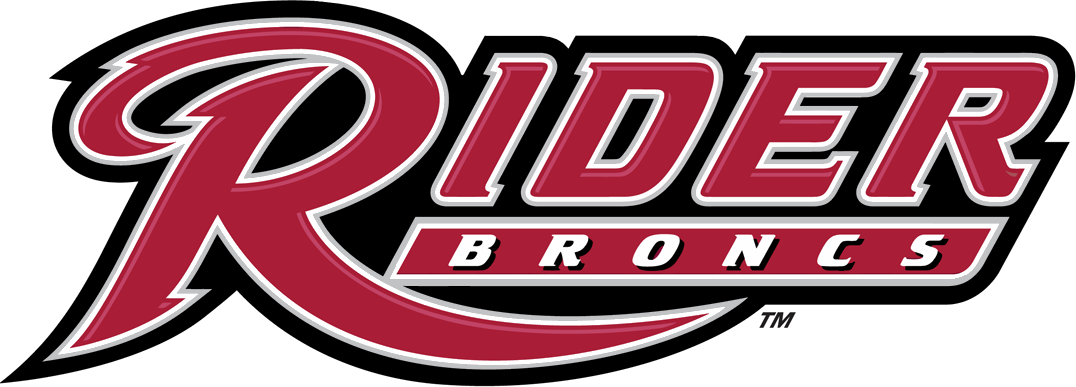
- Conference: Metro Atlantic Athletic Conference
- Record: 7–22 (5–15 MAAC)
- Head coach: Lynn Milligan (18th season)
- Associate head coach: MyNeshia McKenzie
- Assistant coaches: Sharay Hall; Alyssa Parsons
- Home arena: Alumni Gymnasium

2024–25 MAAC women's basketball standings
	Conf.				Overall
Team	W		L	PCT	W		L	PCT
Fairfield †	19	–	1	.950	28	–	5	.848
Quinnipiac	18	–	2	.900	28	–	5	.848
Siena	14	–	6	.700	17	–	14	.548
Mount St. Mary's	12	–	8	.600	15	–	16	.484
Marist	11	–	9	.550	16	–	15	.516
Merrimack	9	–	11	.450	14	–	17	.452
Saint Peter's	9	–	11	.450	11	–	19	.367
Manhattan	9	–	11	.450	16	–	15	.516
Canisius	9	–	11	.450	10	–	21	.323
Iona	8	–	12	.400	11	–	21	.344
Rider	5	–	15	.250	7	–	22	.241
Sacred Heart	5	–	15	.250	9	–	20	.310
Niagara	2	–	18	.100	3	–	25	.107
† 2025 MAAC tournament winner

The 2024–25 Rider Broncs women's basketball team represented Rider University during the 2024–25 NCAA Division I women's basketball season. The Broncs, led by 18th-year head coach Lynn Milligan, played their home games at the Alumni Gymnasium in Lawrenceville, New Jersey as members of the Metro Atlantic Athletic Conference.

== Previous season ==
The Broncs finished the 2023–24 season 10–21, 6–14 in MAAC play, to finish in a tie for eighth place. They defeated Iona before falling to top-seeded and eventual tournament champions Fairfield in the quarterfinals of the MAAC tournament.

== Roster ==
2024–25 Rider Broncs women's basketball team
Players
Coaches

Pos.	#	Name	Height	Year	Previous school	Hometown
G	0	Sanaa Redmond	5 ft 6 in (1.68 m)	Sr	Samford	Philadelphia, Pennsylvania
G	1	Aliya McIver	5 ft 9 in (1.75 m)	So	White Plains High School	White Plains, New York
G	2	Camryn Collins	5 ft 9 in (1.75 m)	Fr	Foxborough High School	Foxborough, Massachusetts
G	3	Jamia Blake	5 ft 9 in (1.75 m)	Sr	UNC Asheville	Rock Hill, South Carolina
F	9	Emilee Tahata	6 ft 0 in (1.83 m)	Jr	La Salle	Springfield, Australia
G	10	Amany Lopez	5 ft 8 in (1.73 m)	Fr	South Shore Christian Prep	Springfield, Massachusetts
G	11	Emmy Roach	6 ft 0 in (1.83 m)	Fr	Eastern Mavericks	Littlehampton, Australia
G	12	Taylor Blunt	5 ft 8 in (1.73 m)	RS Jr	Detroit Mercy	Delco, Pennsylvania
G	13	Mariona Cos-Morales	6 ft 1 in (1.85 m)	Sr	Casper College	Matadepera, Spain
F	14	Sam Richardson	6 ft 3 in (1.91 m)	So	St. Benedict's Prep	Linden, New Jersey
G	23	Jocelyn Chavez	5 ft 9 in (1.75 m)	Fr	Valley Vista High School	Surprise, Arizona
F	24	Winner Bartholomew	6 ft 1 in (1.85 m)	Fr	Day Secondary School Birgi	Abuja, Nigeria
G	31	Gabby Turco	5 ft 10 in (1.78 m)	Sr	La Salle	Wildwood, New Jersey
C	44	Kaylan Deveney	6 ft 3 in (1.91 m)	So	Life Center Academy	Medford, New Jersey

Head coach

- Lynn Milligan (Rider)

Assistant coach(es)

- MyNeshia McKenzie (Rider)
- Sharay Hall (Lock Haven)
- Alyssa Parsons (Rider)

Legend

- (C) Team captain
- (S) Suspended
- (I) Ineligible
- (W) Walk-on
- Injured
- Current redshirt

Roster
Last update: February 23, 2025

== Schedule and results ==
Date time, TV	Rank^{#}	Opponent^{#}	Result	Record	Site (attendance) city, state
Non-conference regular season
November 4, 2024*; 6:00 pm, ESPN+		Navy	L 52–74	0–1	Alumni Gymnasium (589); Lawrenceville, NJ
November 12, 2024*; 7:00 pm, NEC Front Row		at LIU	W 66–54	1–1	Steinberg Wellness Center (89); Brooklyn, NY
November 15, 2024*; 5:00 pm, ESPN+		Bryant	L 54–62	1–2	Alumni Gymnasium (489); Lawrenceville, NJ
November 20, 2024*; 6:30 pm, ESPN+		at La Salle	L 54–55	1–3	John Glaser Arena (211); Philadelphia, PA
November 24, 2024*; 1:00 pm, ESPN+		at VCU	L 60–75	1–4	Siegel Center (451); Richmond, VA
December 1, 2024*; 1:00 pm, ESPN+		at Boston University	L 59–64	1–5	Case Gym (864); Boston, MA
December 5, 2024*; 7:00 pm, FloHoops/SNY/NBCSP		at Monmouth	L 36–52	1–6	OceanFirst Bank Center (562); West Long Branch, NJ
December 8, 2024*; 2:00 pm, ESPN+		Fairleigh Dickinson	L 54–62	1–7	Alumni Gymnasium (684); Lawrenceville, NJ
December 14, 2024*; 6:00 pm, ESPN+		Stonehill	W 65–53	2–7	Alumni Gymnasium (584); Lawrenceville, NJ
MAAC regular season
December 19, 2024; 11:00 am, ESPN+		at Quinnipiac	L 62–70	2–8 (0–1)	M&T Bank Arena (2,943); Hamden, CT
January 2, 2025; 6:00 pm, ESPN+		Fairfield	L 37–69	2–9 (0–2)	Alumni Gymnasium (416); Lawrenceville, NJ
January 4, 2025; 2:00 pm, ESPN+		at Manhattan	L 40–81	2–10 (0–3)	Draddy Gymnasium (220); Riverdale, NY
January 9, 2025; 6:00 pm, ESPN+		Canisius	L 43–63	2–11 (0–4)	Alumni Gymnasium (286); Lawrenceville, NJ
January 11, 2025; 2:00 pm, ESPN+		Niagara	W 79–59	3–11 (1–4)	Alumni Gymnasium (342); Lawrenceville, NJ
January 16, 2025; 7:00 pm, ESPN+		at Mount St. Mary's	L 60–66	3–12 (1–5)	Knott Arena (471); Emmitsburg, MD
January 18, 2025; 4:00 pm, ESPN+		Marist	L 55–67	3–13 (1–6)	Alumni Gymnasium (389); Lawrenceville, NJ
January 23, 2025; 11:00 am, ESPN+		at Iona	L 53–84	3–14 (1–7)	Hynes Athletics Center (1,704); New Rochelle, NY
January 25, 2025; 2:00 pm, ESPN+		Quinnipiac	L 53–66	3–15 (1–8)	Alumni Gymnasium (466); Lawrenceville, NJ
January 30, 2025; 7:00 pm, ESPN+		at Saint Peter's	W 57–52	4–15 (2–8)	Run Baby Run Arena (298); Jersey City, NJ
February 1, 2025; 3:00 pm, ESPN+		at Merrimack	W 65–63	5–15 (3–8)	Hammel Court (313); North Andover, MA
February 6, 2025; 6:00 pm, ESPN+		Sacred Heart	W 72–57	6–15 (4–8)	Alumni Gymnasium (424); Lawrenceville, NJ
February 8, 2025; 2:00 pm, ESPN+		at Siena	L 49–68	6–16 (4–9)	UHY Center (699); Loudonville, NY
February 13, 2025; 6:00 pm, ESPN+		Iona	L 60–65	6–17 (4–10)	Alumni Gymnasium (436); Lawrenceville, NJ
February 15, 2025; 1:30 pm, ESPN+		Saint Peter's	L 54–55	6–18 (4–11)	Alumni Gymnasium (784); Lawrenceville, NJ
February 20, 2025; 7:00 pm, ESPN+		at Fairfield	L 46–72	6–19 (4–12)	Leo D. Mahoney Arena (835); Fairfield, CT
February 22, 2025; 5:00 pm, ESPN+		Mount St. Mary's	L 49–76	6–20 (4–13)	Alumni Gymnasium (414); Lawrenceville, NJ
February 27, 2025; 6:00 pm, ESPN+		Merrimack	W 64–61	7–20 (5–13)	Alumni Gymnasium (386); Lawrenceville, NJ
March 6, 2025; 6:00 pm, ESPN+		at Canisius	L 61–77	7–21 (5–14)	Koessler Athletic Center (521); Buffalo, NY
March 8, 2025; 1:00 pm, ESPN+		at Niagara	L 65–67	7–22 (5–15)	Gallagher Center (379); Lewiston, NY
*Non-conference game. ^{#}Rankings from AP Poll. (#) Tournament seedings in parentheses. All times are in Eastern.
