= 2024–25 Canisius Golden Griffins women's basketball team =

American college basketball season

2024–25 Canisius Golden Griffins women's basketball
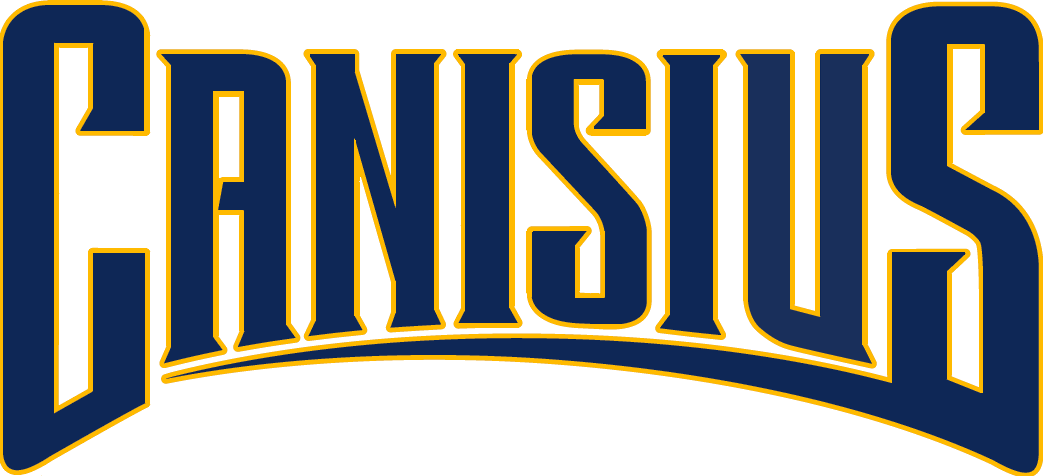
- Conference: Metro Atlantic Athletic Conference
- Record: 10–22 (9–11 MAAC)
- Head coach: Tiffany Swoffard (1st season)
- Assistant coaches: Lindsay Hieronymus; Stephan Walton; Courtney Roman
- Home arena: Koessler Athletic Center

2024–25 MAAC women's basketball standings
	Conf.				Overall
Team	W		L	PCT	W		L	PCT
Fairfield †	19	–	1	.950	28	–	5	.848
Quinnipiac	18	–	2	.900	28	–	5	.848
Siena	14	–	6	.700	17	–	14	.548
Mount St. Mary's	12	–	8	.600	15	–	16	.484
Marist	11	–	9	.550	16	–	15	.516
Merrimack	9	–	11	.450	14	–	17	.452
Saint Peter's	9	–	11	.450	11	–	19	.367
Manhattan	9	–	11	.450	16	–	15	.516
Canisius	9	–	11	.450	10	–	21	.323
Iona	8	–	12	.400	11	–	21	.344
Rider	5	–	15	.250	7	–	22	.241
Sacred Heart	5	–	15	.250	9	–	20	.310
Niagara	2	–	18	.100	3	–	25	.107
† 2025 MAAC tournament winner

The 2024–25 Canisius Golden Griffins women's basketball team represented Canisius University during the 2024–25 NCAA Division I women's basketball season. The Golden Griffins, led by first-year head coach Tiffany Swoffard, played their home games at the Koessler Athletic Center in Buffalo, New York as members of the Metro Atlantic Athletic Conference (MAAC).

The Golden Griffins finished the season 10–21, 8–11 in MAAC play, to finish in a four-way tie for sixth place. They lost in the first round of the MAAC tournament to Manhattan.

== Previous season ==
The Golden Griffins finished the 2023–24 season 17–14, 11–9 in MAAC play, to finish in a tie for fourth place. They defeated Manhattan before falling to top-seeded and eventual tournament champions Fairfield in the semifinals of the MAAC tournament.

On March 28, 2024, it was announced that head coach Sahar Nusseibeh would be leaving the school after three seasons, in order to take the head coaching position at Eastern Michigan. On April 17, the school announced that they would be hiring Penn State assistant coach Tiffany Swoffard as the team's new head coach.

== Roster ==
2024–25 Canisius Golden Griffins women's basketball team
Players
Coaches

Pos.	#	Name	Height	Year	Previous school	Hometown
G	0	Jaela Johnson	5 ft 5 in (1.65 m)	GS	IUPUI	Louisville, KY
G	1	Ari Parker	5 ft 10 in (1.78 m)	Fr	Cass Technical High School	Detroit, MI
G	2	Alex Moses	5 ft 9 in (1.75 m)	Fr	Duanesburg High School	Delanson, NY
G	3	Mary Copple	5 ft 7 in (1.7 m)	So	Brighton High School	Brighton, MI
G	4	Corniya Clay	5 ft 5 in (1.65 m)	Fr	Central Catholic High School	Toledo, OH
F	5	Irene Rey Pineda	5 ft 10 in (1.78 m)	Fr	Movistar Estudiantes B.C.	Madrid, Spain
F	11	Mariam Sanogo	6 ft 2 in (1.88 m)	Jr	Odessa College	Paris, France
G	12	Saige Randolph	5 ft 5 in (1.65 m)	So	Albany Academy for Girls	Albany, NY
G	13	Xanthippi Karatasiou	5 ft 9 in (1.75 m)	Sr	High School of Kontariotissa	Katerini, Greece
G	14	Cory Santoro	5 ft 5 in (1.65 m)	Sr	Lander	Bellevue, OH
F	15	Sara Carvajal Caro	6 ft 3 in (1.91 m)	Sr	Troy	Seville, Spain
G	22	Franka Wittenberg	5 ft 8 in (1.73 m)	Jr	Fresno State	Hildesheim, Germany
F	23	Jordan Day	6 ft 3 in (1.91 m)	Fr	Purcell Marian High School	Cincinnati, OH
F	33	Yasmine Djibril	6 ft 1 in (1.85 m)	Fr	Collège Montmorency	Montreal, QC
F	34	Shariah Gailes	6 ft 0 in (1.83 m)	So	Illinois–Springfield	Brooklyn, OH

Head coach

- Tiffany Swoffard (Austin Peay)

Assistant coach(es)

- Lindsay Hieronymus (Transylvania)
- Stephan Walton (Manitoba)
- Courtney Roman (Penn State)

Legend

- (C) Team captain
- (S) Suspended
- (I) Ineligible
- (W) Walk-on
- Injured
- Current redshirt

Roster
Last update: February 23, 2025

== Schedule and results ==
Date time, TV	Rank^{#}	Opponent^{#}	Result	Record	Site (attendance) city, state
Exhibition
October 24, 2024*; 5:30 p.m.		Lock Haven	W 66–59	–	Koessler Athletic Center; Buffalo, NY
Regular season
November 5, 2024*; 6:00 p.m., ACCNX		at Pittsburgh	L 36–78	0–1	Petersen Events Center (306); Pittsburgh, PA
November 7, 2024*; 6:00 p.m., B1G+		at Penn State	L 57–89	0–2	Bryce Jordan Center (1,741); State College, PA
November 15, 2024*; 11:00 a.m., NEC Front Row		at Saint Francis	W 48–46	1–2	DeGol Arena (1,418); Loretto, PA
November 19, 2024*; 6:00 p.m., ESPN+		St. Bonaventure	L 63–66	1–3	Koessler Athletic Center (785); Buffalo, NY
November 22, 2024*; 6:00 p.m., ESPN+		Buffalo	L 50–62	1–4	Koessler Athletic Center (550); Buffalo, NY
November 25, 2024*; 11:00 a.m., ESPN+		Binghamton	L 58–68	1–5	Koessler Athletic Center (2,196); Buffalo, NY
December 2, 2024*; 6:00 p.m., ESPN+		No. 21 Illinois	L 55–68	1–6	Koessler Athletic Center (607); Buffalo, NY
December 7, 2024*; 12:00 p.m., ESPN+		at Akron	L 43–82	1–7	James A. Rhodes Arena (418); Akron, OH
December 15, 2024*; 2:00 p.m., ESPN+		at Duquesne	L 66–90	1–8	UPMC Cooper Fieldhouse (762); Pittsburgh, PA
December 19, 2024; 7:00 p.m., ESPN+		at Merrimack	L 47–62	1–9 (0–1)	Hammel Court (131); North Andover, MA
December 21, 2024; 2:00 p.m., ESPN+		at Siena	L 61–67	1–10 (0–2)	UHY Center (462); Loudonville, NY
December 29, 2024*; 1:00 p.m., ESPN+		Colgate	L 47–66	1–11	Koessler Athletic Center (422); Buffalo, NY
January 4, 2025; 1:00 p.m., ESPN+		Sacred Heart	L 63–70	1–12 (0–3)	Koessler Athletic Center (466); Buffalo, NY
January 9, 2025; 6:00 p.m., ESPN+		at Rider	W 63–43	2–12 (1–3)	Alumni Gymnasium (286); Lawrenceville, NJ
January 11, 2025; 2:00 p.m., ESPN+		at Saint Peter's	L 55–61	2–13 (1–4)	Run Baby Run Arena (125); Jersey City, NJ
January 16, 2025; 6:00 p.m., ESPN+		Iona	W 66–63	3–13 (2–4)	Koessler Athletic Center (552); Buffalo, NY
January 18, 2025; 1:00 p.m., ESPN+		Fairfield	L 51–97	3–14 (2–5)	Koessler Athletic Center (432); Buffalo, NY
January 23, 2025; 7:00 p.m., ESPN+		at Sacred Heart	W 67–53	4–14 (3–5)	William H. Pitt Center (555); Fairfield, CT
January 25, 2025; 2:00 p.m., ESPN+		at Marist	L 48–67	4–15 (3–6)	McCann Arena (1,139); Poughkeepsie, NY
January 30, 2025; 6:00 p.m., ESPN+		at Niagara; Battle of the Bridge	W 70–53	5–15 (4–6)	Gallagher Center (483); Lewiston, NY
February 6, 2025; 6:00 p.m., ESPN+		Quinnipiac	L 41–56	5–16 (4–7)	Koessler Athletic Center (486); Buffalo, NY
February 8, 2025; 1:00 p.m., ESPN+		Merrimack	W 68–62	6–16 (5–7)	Koessler Athletic Center (535); Buffalo, NY
February 11, 2025; 6:00 p.m., ESPN+		Niagara; Battle of the Bridge	W 48–46	7–16 (6–7)	Koessler Athletic Center (498); Buffalo, NY
February 15, 2025; 2:00 p.m., ESPN+		at Mount St. Mary's	L 59–72	7–17 (6–8)	Knott Arena (561); Emmitsburg, MD
February 20, 2025; 6:00 p.m., ESPN+		Marist	L 62–69 ^{OT}	7–18 (6–9)	Koessler Athletic Center (312); Buffalo, NY
February 22, 2025; 1:00 p.m., ESPN+		Siena	L 58–72	7–19 (6–10)	Koessler Athletic Center (492); Buffalo, NY
February 27, 2025; 7:00 p.m., ESPN+		at Manhattan	L 35–71	7–20 (6–11)	Draddy Gymnasium (204); Riverdale, NY
March 1, 2025; 1:00 p.m., ESPN+		at Iona	W 53–48	8–20 (7–11)	Hynes Athletics Center (1,075); New Rochelle, NY
March 6, 2025; 6:00 p.m., ESPN+		Rider	W 77–61	9–21 (8–11)	Koessler Athletic Center (521); Buffalo, NY
March 8, 2025; 1:00 p.m., ESPN+		Saint Peter's	W 50–47	10–21 (9–11)	Koessler Athletic Center (473); Buffalo, NY
MAAC tournament
March 11, 2025; 12:00 p.m., ESPN+	(9)	vs. (8) Manhattan; First round	L 42–52	10–22	Boardwalk Hall; Atlantic City, NJ
*Non-conference game. ^{#}Rankings from AP Poll. (#) Tournament seedings in parentheses. All times are in Eastern.
