= 2024–25 Marist Red Foxes women's basketball team =

American college basketball season

2024–25 Marist Red Foxes women's basketball
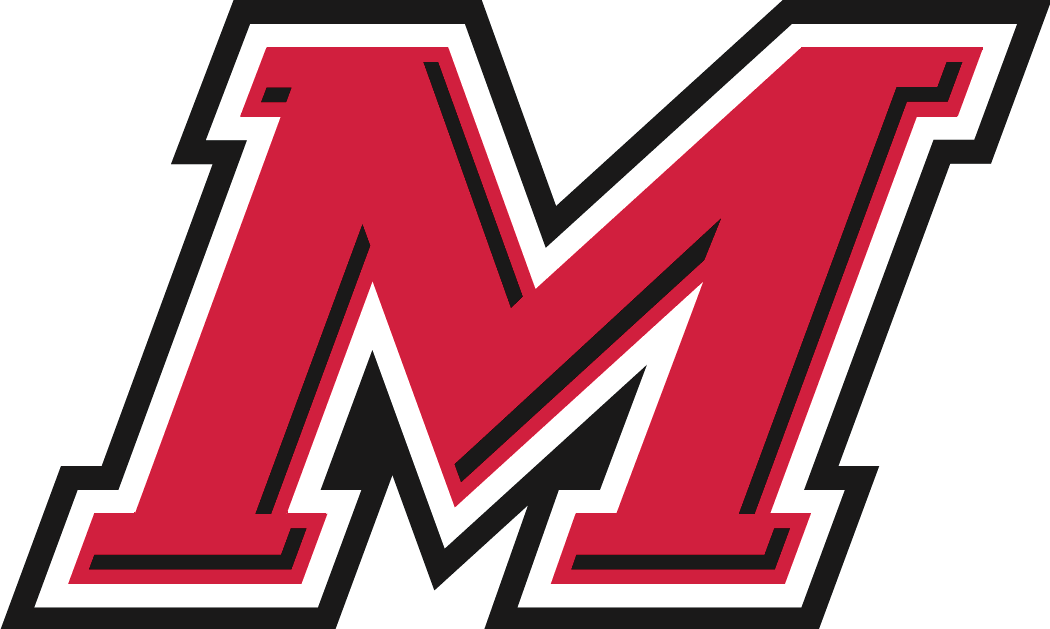
- Conference: Metro Atlantic Athletic Conference
- Record: 13–12 (8–7 MAAC)
- Head coach: Erin Doughty (2nd season)
- Assistant coaches: Nick Volchok; Brittany Shields; Moriah Crisp; Gabi Mendonca
- Home arena: McCann Arena

2024–25 MAAC women's basketball standings
| | Conf. | | | | Overall |
| Team | W | | L | PCT | W | | L | PCT |
|---|---|---|---|---|---|---|---|---|
| Fairfield † | 19 | – | 1 | .950 | 28 | – | 5 | .848 |
| Quinnipiac | 18 | – | 2 | .900 | 28 | – | 5 | .848 |
| Siena | 14 | – | 6 | .700 | 17 | – | 14 | .548 |
| Mount St. Mary's | 12 | – | 8 | .600 | 15 | – | 16 | .484 |
| Marist | 11 | – | 9 | .550 | 16 | – | 15 | .516 |
| Merrimack | 9 | – | 11 | .450 | 14 | – | 17 | .452 |
| Saint Peter's | 9 | – | 11 | .450 | 11 | – | 19 | .367 |
| Manhattan | 9 | – | 11 | .450 | 16 | – | 15 | .516 |
| Canisius | 9 | – | 11 | .450 | 10 | – | 21 | .323 |
| Iona | 8 | – | 12 | .400 | 11 | – | 21 | .344 |
| Rider | 5 | – | 15 | .250 | 7 | – | 22 | .241 |
| Sacred Heart | 5 | – | 15 | .250 | 9 | – | 20 | .310 |
| Niagara | 2 | – | 18 | .100 | 3 | – | 25 | .107 |
† 2025 MAAC tournament winner

The 2024–25 Marist Red Foxes women's basketball team represented Marist University during the 2024–25 NCAA Division I women's basketball season. The Red Foxes, led by second-year head coach Erin Doughty, played their home games at the McCann Arena in Poughkeepsie, New York as members of the Metro Atlantic Athletic Conference.

== Previous season ==
The Red Foxes finished the 2023–24 season 6–25, 4–16 in MAAC play, to finish in a tie for last place. They were defeated by Mount St. Mary's in the first round of the MAAC tournament.

== Roster ==
2024–25 Marist Red Foxes women's basketball team
Players
Coaches

| Pos. | # | Name | Height | Year | Previous school | Hometown |
|---|---|---|---|---|---|---|
| G | 1 | Malea Egan | 5 ft 7 in (1.7 m) | So | Montana State | Sacramento, California |
| G | 2 | Jackie Piddock | 5 ft 8 in (1.73 m) | Jr | South Jefferson High School | Adams, New York |
| G | 3 | Chloe Escanillas | 5 ft 9 in (1.75 m) | Fr | Rutgers Prep | Edison, New Jersey |
| G | 5 | Julia Corsentino | 5 ft 8 in (1.73 m) | So | Rumson-Fair Haven High School | Fair Haven, New Jersey |
| G | 11 | Jayne Whitman | 5 ft 6 in (1.68 m) | Jr | Amity Regional High School | Orange, Connecticut |
| G | 13 | Nicole Decker | 5 ft 7 in (1.7 m) | Fr | Thomaston High School | Thomaston, Connecticut |
| G | 21 | Danielle Williamsen | 5 ft 7 in (1.7 m) | Fr | St. Joseph by the Sea High School | Staten Island, New York |
| F | 22 | Ciara Croker | 6 ft 0 in (1.83 m) | Jr | The Ursuline School | New Rochelle, New York |
| G | 23 | Lexie Tarul | 5 ft 11 in (1.8 m) | RS Jr | Fordham | Bronx, New York |
| F | 24 | Kate Robbins | 6 ft 2 in (1.88 m) | So | Upper St. Clair High School | Pittsburgh, Pennsylvania |
| G | 25 | Catie Cunningham | 5 ft 11 in (1.8 m) | Sr | West Genesee High School | Syracuse, New York |
| G | 30 | Morgan Tompkins | 5 ft 11 in (1.8 m) | Jr | Red Hook High School | Red Hook, New York |
| C | 31 | Morgan Lee | 6 ft 5 in (1.96 m) | Jr | Georgetown | Kent, Connecticut |
| F | 32 | Brooke Jarvis | 5 ft 11 in (1.8 m) | GS | Hobart and William Smith | Syracuse, New York |
| F | 42 | McKenna Rife | 6 ft 3 in (1.91 m) | Sr | Saint Maria Goretti High School | Greencastle, Pennsylvania |

Head coach

- Erin Doughty (Marist)

Assistant coach(es)

- Nick Volchok (Mercy)
- Brittany Shields (Pace)
- Moriah Crisp (UNC Wilmington)
- Gabi Mendonca (Connecticut)

Legend

- (C) Team captain
- (S) Suspended
- (I) Ineligible
- (W) Walk-on
- Injured
- Current redshirt

Roster
Last update: February 21, 2025

== Schedule and results ==
| Date time, TV | Rank^{#} | Opponent^{#} | Result | Record | Site (attendance) city, state |
Non-conference regular season
| November 7, 2024*; 7:00 pm, FloHoops | | at Drexel | L 53–64 | 0–1 | Daskalakis Athletic Center (728); Philadelphia, PA |
| November 10, 2024*; 2:00 pm, ESPN+ | | Cornell | W 62–56 | 1–1 | McCann Arena (889); Poughkeepsie, NY |
| November 13, 2024*; 7:00 pm, ESPN+ | | Lafayette | W 73–41 | 2–1 | McCann Arena (861); Poughkeepsie, NY |
| November 18, 2024*; 7:00 pm, SNY/FloHoops | | at Stony Brook | L 49–69 | 2–2 | Stony Brook Arena (651); Stony Brook, NY |
| November 21, 2024*; 7:00 pm, FloHoops | | at St. John's | L 49–69 | 2–3 | Carnesecca Arena (321); Queens, NY |
| November 26, 2024*; 7:00 pm, ESPN+ | | Yale | W 67–65 | 3–3 | McCann Arena (901); Poughkeepsie, NY |
| November 30, 2024*; 12:00 pm, ESPN+ | | at Lehigh; Lehigh Christmas City Classic | L 39–56 | 3–4 | Stabler Arena (482); Bethlehem, PA |
| December 1, 2024*; 12:00 pm | | vs. North Dakota; Lehigh Christmas City Classic | W 60–56 | 4–4 | Stabler Arena (348); Bethlehem, PA |
| December 7, 2024*; 2:00 pm, ESPN+ | | at Bryant | W 63–52 | 5–4 | Chace Athletic Center (285); Smithfield, RI |
| December 17, 2024*; 10:30 am, ESPN+ | | at Holy Cross | L 49–66 | 5–5 | Hart Center (3,077); Worcester, MA |
MAAC regular season
| December 19, 2024; 7:00 pm, ESPN+ | | at Mount St. Mary's | W 61–50 ^{OT} | 6–5 (1–0) | Knott Arena (161); Emmitsburg, MD |
| December 21, 2024; 7:00 pm, ESPN+ | | Manhattan | W 58–51 | 7–5 (2–0) | McCann Arena (807); Poughkeepsie, NY |
| January 2, 2025; 7:00 pm, ESPN+ | | Iona | L 67–69 | 7–6 (2–1) | McCann Arena (783); Poughkeepsie, NY |
| January 4, 2025; 1:00 pm, ESPN+ | | at Quinnipiac | L 52–64 | 7–7 (2–2) | M&T Bank Arena (653); Hamden, CT |
| January 11, 2025; 2:00 pm, ESPN+ | | at Fairfield | L 31–70 | 7–8 (2–3) | Leo D. Mahoney Arena (747); Fairfield, CT |
| January 16, 2025; 11:00 am, ESPN+ | | Saint Peter's | W 50–30 | 8–8 (3–3) | McCann Arena (1,814); Poughkeepsie, NY |
| January 18, 2025; 4:00 pm, ESPN+ | | at Rider | W 67–55 | 9–8 (4–3) | Alumni Gymnasium (389); Lawrenceville, NJ |
| January 23, 2025; 7:00 pm, ESPN+ | | Niagara | W 74–52 | 10–8 (5–3) | McCann Arena (746); Poughkeepsie, NY |
| January 25, 2025; 2:00 pm, ESPN+ | | Canisius | W 67–48 | 11–8 (6–3) | McCann Arena (1,139); Poughkeepsie, NY |
| January 30, 2025; 6:00 pm, ESPN+ | | at Siena | L 46–62 | 11–9 (6–4) | UHY Center (808); Loudonville, NY |
| February 6, 2025; 7:00 pm, ESPN+ | | Fairfield | L 49–80 | 11–10 (6–5) | McCann Arena (790); Poughkeepsie, NY |
| February 8, 2025; 1:00 pm, ESPN+ | | at Iona | W 63–43 | 12–10 (7–5) | Hynes Athletics Center (1,104); New Rochelle, NY |
| February 13, 2025; 7:00 pm, ESPN+ | | Siena | L 69–81 | 12–11 (7–6) | McCann Arena (772); Poughkeepsie, NY |
| February 15, 2025; 1:00 pm, ESPN+ | | Merrimack | L 48–55 | 12–12 (7–7) | McCann Arena (672); Poughkeepsie, NY |
| February 20, 2025; 6:00 pm, ESPN+ | | at Canisius | W 69–62 ^{OT} | 13–12 (8–7) | Koessler Athletic Center (312); Buffalo, NY |
| February 22, 2025; 2:00 pm, ESPN+ | | at Niagara | W 67–56 | 14–12 (9–7) | Gallagher Center (412); Lewiston, NY |
| February 27, 2025; 7:00 pm, ESPN+ | | Sacred Heart | W 68–61 | 15–12 (10–7) | McCann Arena (801); Poughkeepsie, NY |
| March 1, 2025; 2:00 pm, ESPN+ | | at Saint Peter's | W 63–61 | 16–12 (11–7) | Run Baby Run Arena (272); Jersey City, NJ |
| March 6, 2025; 7:00 pm, ESPN+ | | at Merrimack | L 47–55 | 16–13 (11–8) | Hammel Court (367); North Andover, MA |
| March 8, 2025; 2:00 pm, ESPN+ | | Mount St. Mary's | L 50–61 | 16–14 (11–9) | McCann Arena (1,152); Poughkeepsie, NY |
MAAC tournament
| March 13, 2025; 12:00 pm, ESPN+ | (5) | vs. (4) Mount St Mary's; Quarterfinals | | | Boardwalk Hall; Atlantic City, NJ |
*Non-conference game. ^{#}Rankings from AP Poll. (#) Tournament seedings in parentheses. All times are in Eastern.
