= 2024–25 Niagara Purple Eagles women's basketball team =

American college basketball season

2024–25 Niagara Purple Eagles women's basketball
- Conference: Metro Atlantic Athletic Conference
- Record: 3–25 (2–18 MAAC)
- Head coach: Jada Pierce (10th season)
- Associate head coach: Brianna Chambers; Lester Harbin
- Assistant coach: Kayla DeCriscio
- Home arena: Gallagher Center

2024–25 MAAC women's basketball standings
	Conf.				Overall
Team	W		L	PCT	W		L	PCT
Fairfield †	19	–	1	.950	28	–	5	.848
Quinnipiac	18	–	2	.900	28	–	5	.848
Siena	14	–	6	.700	17	–	14	.548
Mount St. Mary's	12	–	8	.600	15	–	16	.484
Marist	11	–	9	.550	16	–	15	.516
Merrimack	9	–	11	.450	14	–	17	.452
Saint Peter's	9	–	11	.450	11	–	19	.367
Manhattan	9	–	11	.450	16	–	15	.516
Canisius	9	–	11	.450	10	–	21	.323
Iona	8	–	12	.400	11	–	21	.344
Rider	5	–	15	.250	7	–	22	.241
Sacred Heart	5	–	15	.250	9	–	20	.310
Niagara	2	–	18	.100	3	–	25	.107
† 2025 MAAC tournament winner

The 2024–25 Niagara Purple Eagles women's basketball team represented Niagara University during the 2024–25 NCAA Division I women's basketball season. The Purple Eagles, led by 10th-year head coach Jada Pierce, played their home games at the Gallagher Center in Lewiston, New York as members of the Metro Atlantic Athletic Conference.

== Previous season ==
The Purple Eagles finished the 2023–24 season 21–14, 15–5 in MAAC play, to finish in second place. They defeated Quinnipiac and Siena before falling to top-seeded Fairfield in the MAAC tournament championship game. They received an at-large bid to the WNIT, where they would defeat Le Moyne in the first round, before falling to Vermont in the second round.

== Roster ==
2024–25 Niagara Purple Eagles women's basketball team
Players
Coaches

Pos.	#	Name	Height	Year	Previous school	Hometown
G	0	LaKeeyah Barnes	5 ft 5 in (1.65 m)	Fr	Phillips High School	Chicago, Illinois
G	1	Nevaeh Otis	5 ft 8 in (1.73 m)	Fr	Renaissance High School	Pontiac, Michigan
F	2	Jordyn Williams	5 ft 11 in (1.8 m)	Fr	Cardinal O'Hara High School	Buffalo, New York
G	4	Safiatu Kolliegbo	5 ft 9 in (1.75 m)	So	Georgian Court	Willingboro, New Jersey
G	5	Aaliyah Parker	5 ft 9 in (1.75 m)	Sr	Cardinal O'Hara High School	Cheektowaga, New York
F	10	Amelia Strong	6 ft 2 in (1.88 m)	Jr	Cardinal O'Hara High School	Niagara Falls, New York
G	12	Caliana Fenceroy	5 ft 5 in (1.65 m)	GS	Radford	Omaha, Nebraska
F	13	Talia Dial	5 ft 10 in (1.78 m)	Jr	Scottsdale Community College	El Mirage, Arizona
F	14	Jemima Lacroix	5 ft 11 in (1.8 m)	So	Waterloo	Montreal, Quebec
G	20	Marlie Dickerson	5 ft 10 in (1.78 m)	Jr	Central Dauphin High School	Harrisburg, Pennsylvania
G	21	Lore Porter	5 ft 9 in (1.75 m)	GS	New Hope Academy	Woodbridge, Virginia
F	23	Jade Rutledge	5 ft 10 in (1.78 m)	Jr	Cardinal O'Hara High School	Buffalo, New York
G	24	Myana Cooksey	5 ft 8 in (1.73 m)	Fr	Detroit Edison Public School Academy	Detroit, Michigan

Head coach

- Jada Pierce (West Chester)

Assistant coach(es)

- Brianna Chambers (Cal State Bakersfield)
- Lester Harbin (Lees–McRae)
- Kayla DeCriscio (Pitt–Johnstown)

Legend

- (C) Team captain
- (S) Suspended
- (I) Ineligible
- (W) Walk-on
- Injured
- Current redshirt

Roster
Last update: February 24, 2025

== Schedule and results ==
Date time, TV	Rank^{#}	Opponent^{#}	Result	Record	Site (attendance) city, state
Exhibition
October 30, 2024*; 6:00 pm, ESPN+		Roberts Wesleyan	W 82–41	–	Gallagher Center; Lewiston, NY
Non-conference regular season
November 5, 2024*; 7:00 pm, ACCNX		at Syracuse	L 84–108	0–1	JMA Wireless Dome (1,997); Syracuse, NY
November 9, 2024*; 2:00 pm, ESPN+		at No. 16 West Virginia	L 41–110	0–2	WVU Coliseum (3,166); Morgantown, WV
November 14, 2024*; 11:30 am, B1G+		at Penn State	L 45–101	0–3	Bryce Jordan Center (2,311); University Park, PA
November 16, 2024*; 7:00 pm, ESPN+		at Duquesne	L 65–100	0–4	UPMC Cooper Fieldhouse (835); Pittsburgh, PA
November 21, 2024*; 6:00 pm, ESPN+		Cleveland State	Cancelled		Gallagher Center; Lewiston, NY
November 26, 2024*; 6:00 pm, ESPN+		Buffalo	L 53–86	0–5	Gallagher Center (463); Lewiston, NY
December 1, 2024*; 12:00 pm, ESPN+		Bloomsburg	W 81–60	1–5	Gallagher Center (360); Lewiston, NY
December 5, 2024*; 3:00 pm, ESPN+		Kent State	L 73–89	1–6	Gallagher Center (371); Lewiston, NY
December 17, 2024*; 6:30 pm, ESPN+		at St. Bonaventure	L 68–76	1–7	Reilly Center (305); St. Bonaventure, NY
MAAC regular season
December 19, 2024; 6:00 pm, ESPN+		at Siena	L 57–65	1–8 (0–1)	UHY Center (323); Loudonville, NY
December 21, 2024; 2:00 pm, ESPN+		at Merrimack	L 56–71	1–9 (0–2)	Hammel Court (142); North Andover, MA
January 4, 2025; 1:00 pm, ESPN+		Mount St. Mary's	L 68–89	1–10 (0–3)	Gallagher Center (294); Lewiston, NY
January 9, 2025; 7:00 pm, ESPN+		at Saint Peter's	L 50–80	1–11 (0–4)	Run Baby Run Arena (237); Jersey City, NJ
January 11, 2025; 2:00 pm, ESPN+		at Rider	L 59–79	1–12 (0–5)	Alumni Gymnasium (342); Lawrenceville, NJ
January 16, 2025; 11:00 am, ESPN+		Fairfield	L 49–96	1–13 (0–6)	Gallagher Center (1,175); Lewiston, NY
January 18, 2025; 1:00 pm, ESPN+		Manhattan	L 54–79	1–14 (0–7)	Gallagher Center (309); Lewiston, NY
January 23, 2025; 7:00 pm, ESPN+		at Marist	L 52–74	1–15 (0–8)	McCann Arena (746); Poughkeepsie, NY
January 25, 2025; 12:00 pm, ESPN+		at Sacred Heart	L 43–86	1–16 (0–9)	William H. Pitt Center (925); Fairfield, CT
January 30, 2025; 6:00 pm, ESPN+		Canisius; Battle of the Bridge	L 53–70	1–17 (0–10)	Gallagher Center (483); Lewiston, NY
February 6, 2025; 6:00 pm, ESPN+		Merrimack	L 52–66	1–18 (0–11)	Gallagher Center (381); Lewiston, NY
February 8, 2025; 2:00 pm, ESPN+		Quinnipiac	L 38–70	1–19 (0–12)	Gallagher Center (464); Lewiston, NY
February 11, 2025; 6:00 pm, ESPN+		at Cansius; Battle of the Bridge	L 46–48	1–20 (0–13)	Koessler Athletic Center (498); Buffalo, NY
February 13, 2025; 7:00 pm, ESPN+		at Mount St. Mary's	L 54–75	1–21 (0–14)	Knott Arena (45); Emmitsburg, MD
February 20, 2025; 6:00 pm, ESPN+		Siena	L 64–66	1–22 (0–15)	Gallagher Center (360); Lewiston, NY
February 22, 2025; 2:00 pm, ESPN+		Marist	L 56–67	1–23 (0–16)	Gallagher Center (412); Lewiston, NY
February 27, 2025; 6:00 pm, ESPN+		at Iona	W 61-56	2–23 (1–16)	Hynes Athletics Center (799); New Rochelle, NY
March 1, 2025; 2:00 pm, ESPN+		at Manhattan	L 52-75	2-24 (1-17)	Draddy Gymnasium (187); Riverdale, NY
March 6, 2025; 6:00 pm, ESPN+		Saint Peter's	L 58–70	2–25 (1–18)	Gallagher Center (366); Lewiston, NY
March 8, 2025; 1:00 pm, ESPN+		Rider	W 67–65	3–25 (2–18)	Gallagher Center (379); Lewiston, NY
*Non-conference game. ^{#}Rankings from AP Poll. (#) Tournament seedings in parentheses. All times are in Eastern.
