= 2025 MAAC women's basketball tournament =

American college basketball postseason tournament

- Classification: Division I
- Season: 2024–25
- Teams: 10
- Site: Jim Whelan Boardwalk Hall; Atlantic City, New Jersey
- Television: ESPN+, ESPNU

2024–25 MAAC women's basketball standings
	Conf.				Overall
Team	W		L	PCT	W		L	PCT
Fairfield †	19	–	1	.950	28	–	5	.848
Quinnipiac	18	–	2	.900	28	–	5	.848
Siena	14	–	6	.700	17	–	14	.548
Mount St. Mary's	12	–	8	.600	15	–	16	.484
Marist	11	–	9	.550	16	–	15	.516
Merrimack	9	–	11	.450	14	–	17	.452
Saint Peter's	9	–	11	.450	11	–	19	.367
Manhattan	9	–	11	.450	16	–	15	.516
Canisius	9	–	11	.450	10	–	21	.323
Iona	8	–	12	.400	11	–	21	.344
Rider	5	–	15	.250	7	–	22	.241
Sacred Heart	5	–	15	.250	9	–	20	.310
Niagara	2	–	18	.100	3	–	25	.107
† 2025 MAAC tournament winner

The 2025 Metro Atlantic Athletic Conference women's basketball tournament will be the postseason women's basketball tournament for the Metro Atlantic Athletic Conference for the 2024–25 NCAA Division I women's basketball season. The tournament will be played March 11–15, 2025, at the Jim Whelan Boardwalk Hall in Atlantic City, New Jersey, for the sixth year in a row. The tournament winner will receive the conference's automatic bid to the 2025 NCAA Division I women's basketball tournament.

== Seeds ==
Only the top 10 teams in the conference will participate in the tournament, marking the first time in the history of the conference that not every team will participate in the event. The top six teams will receive byes to the quarterfinals. Teams will be seeded by record within the conference, with a tiebreaker system to seed teams with identical conference records.

Seed	School	Conference	Tiebreaker
1	Fairfield	19–1	
2	Quinnipiac	18–2	
3	Siena	14–6	
4	Mount St. Mary's	12–8	
5	Marist	11–9	
6	Merrimack	9–11	3–2 vs. Saint Peter's/Manhattan/Canisius; 1–0 vs. Saint Peter's
7	Saint Peter's	9–11	3–2 vs. Merrimack/Manhattan/Canisius; 0–1 vs. Merrimack
8	Manhattan	9–11	2–2 vs. Merrimack/Saint Peter's/Canisius
9	Canisius	9–11	2–3 vs. Merrimack/Saint Peter's/Manhattan
10	Iona	8–12	
DNQ	Rider	5–15	1–0 vs. Sacred Heart
DNQ	Sacred Heart	5–15	0–1 vs. Rider
DNQ	Niagara	2–18	

== Schedule ==
Session	Game	Time*	Matchup	Score	Attendance	Television
First round – Tuesday, March 11
1	1	12:00 pm	No. 8 Manhattan vs No. 9 Canisius	52–42		ESPN+
1	2	2:30 pm	No. 7 Saint Peter's vs No. 10 Iona	40–42		ESPN+
Quarterfinals – Wednesday, March 12
2	3	12:00 pm	No. 1 Fairfield vs No. 8 Manhattan	58–51		ESPN+
2	4	2:30 pm	No. 2 Quinnipiac vs No. 10 Iona	79–51		ESPN+
Quarterfinals – Thursday, March 13
3	5	12:00 pm	No. 4 Mount St. Mary's vs No. 5 Marist	68–65		ESPN+
3	6	2:30 pm	No. 3 Siena vs No. 6 Merrimack	72–79		ESPN+
Semifinals – Friday, March 14
4	7	12:00 pm	No. 1 Fairfield vs No. 4 Mount St. Mary's	49–48		ESPN+
4	8	2:30 pm	No. 2 Quinnipiac vs No. 6 Merrimack	65–51		ESPN+
Championship – Saturday, March 15
5	9	1:30 pm	No. 1 Fairfield vs No. 2 Quinnipiac	76–53		ESPNU
*Game times in EDT. Rankings denote tournament seeding.

== Bracket ==
First round March 11, 2025; ESPN+
8	Manhattan	52
9	Canisius	42
7	Saint Peter's	40
10	Iona	42

Quarterfinals; March 12–13, 2025; ESPN+
1	Fairfield	58
8	Manhattan	51
4	Mount St. Mary's	68
5	Marist	65
2	Quinnipiac	79
10	Iona	51
3	Siena	72
6	Merrimack	79

Semifinals; March 14, 2025
1	Fairfield	49
4	Mount St. Mary's	48
2	Quinnipiac	65
6	Merrimack	51

Championship; March 15, 2025
1	Fairfield	76
2	Quinnipiac	53

== See also ==
- 2025 MAAC men's basketball tournament
