= William H. Pitt Center =

Arena in Fairfield, Connecticut

William H. Pitt Health and Recreation Center
- Home of the Sacred Heart Pioneers
- Interactive map of William H. Pitt Health and Recreation Center
- Full name: William H. Pitt Health and Recreation Center
- Location: 5151 Park Avenue; Fairfield, Connecticut 06825
- Coordinates: 41°13′9.98″N 73°14′40.66″W
- Owner: City of Fairfield
- Operator: Sacred Heart University
- Capacity: 2,000
- Surface: Mondo flooring

Construction
- Groundbreaking: 1995
- Opened: August 17, 1997
- Cost: $13.8 million ($27.7 million in 2025 dollars)
- Architects: Rose Tiso & Co. LLC
- Project managers: CPM & Associates

Tenants
- Sacred Heart Pioneers (NCAA) (1997–present); Connecticut Skyhawks (USBL) (1998–1999)

The William H. Pitt Health and Recreation Center is a 2,000-seat multi-purpose arena in Fairfield, Connecticut on the campus of Sacred Heart University. It was opened in August 1997 and is home to Sacred Heart University men's and women's basketball, men's and women's volleyball, men's wrestling and fencing. It hosted the finals of the 2008 Northeast Conference men's basketball tournament.

Constructing the facility cost $13.8 million. The William H. Pitt Health and Recreation Center has three levels and houses four basketball courts, a fitness center, an aerobics and fencing room, and a sports medicine and rehabilitation center. Outdoors near the Pitt Center, there is an artificial turf athletic field with an eight-lane outdoor running track, six artificial surface tennis courts, and several grass fields and trails around campus.

In 2007, the Pitt Center underwent major renovations. On the lower level, a wrestling room, a weight room, more locker room space, and new floors were added. The Pitt Center also was re-painted.

== See also ==
- List of NCAA Division I basketball arenas
