= Leo D. Mahoney Arena =

Athletic facility at Fairfield University in Connecticut, US

Mahoney Arena
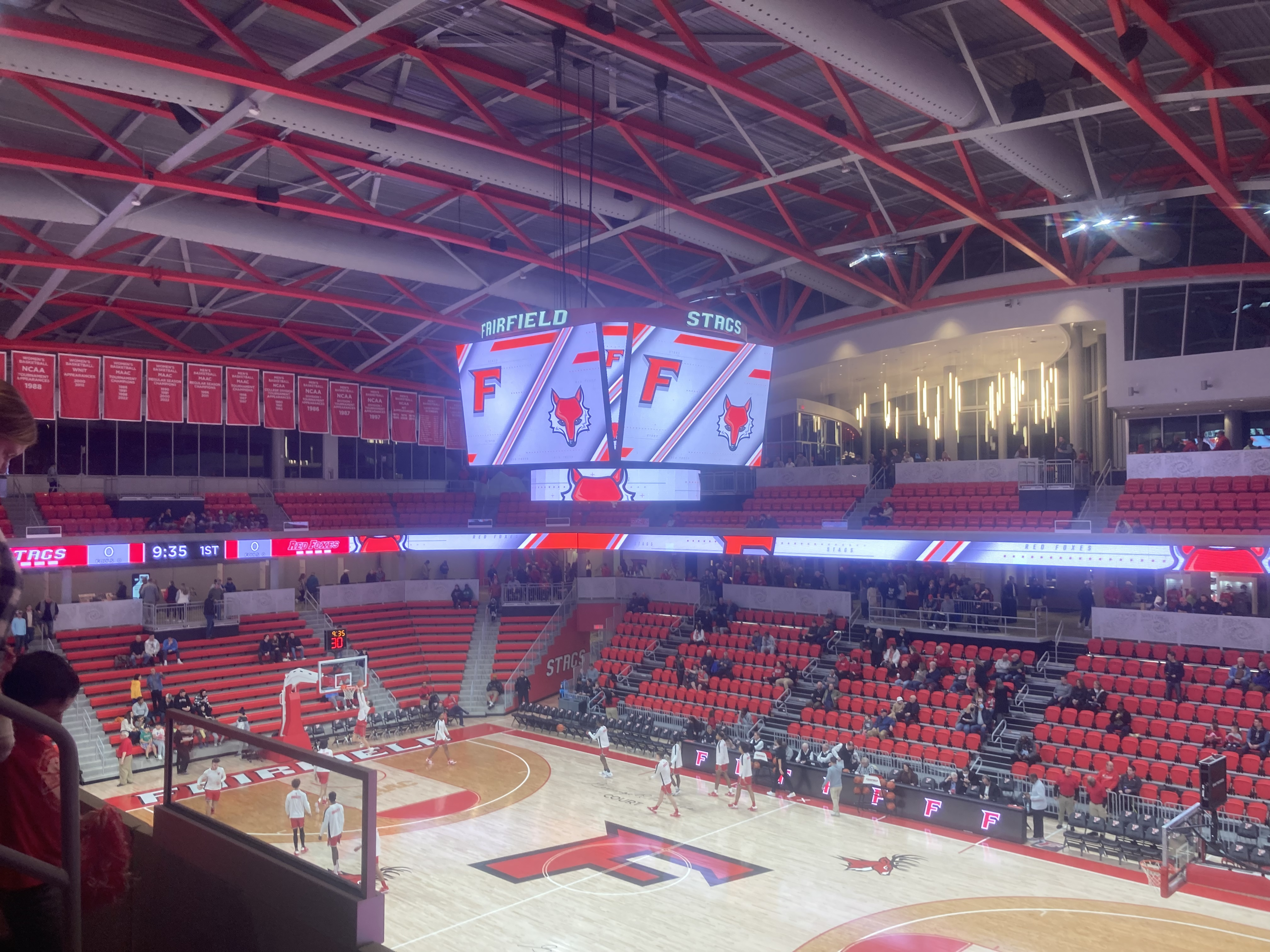
- Full name: Leo D. Mahoney Arena
- Location: Loyola Drive; Fairfield, CT 06824
- Owner: Fairfield University
- Operator: Fairfield University
- Capacity: 3,500
- Surface: Hardwood

Construction
- Opened: 18 November 2022
- Cost: $51 million
- Architect: Centerbrook
- General contractor: Gilbane Building Company

Tenant
- Fairfield Stags (NCAA) (2022–present)

Leo D. Mahoney Arena is a 3,500-seat multi-purpose arena on the campus of Fairfield University, located in Fairfield, Connecticut. It is home to the Fairfield Stags men's basketball, women's basketball and volleyball teams. The 85,000 square foot building was opened in November 2022 on the site of Fairfield's former on campus arena, Alumni Hall. With the opening of Mahoney Arena, the men's Stags basketball team played all its home games on campus for the first time in 2022-23 since the 1999-2000 season, instead of the larger Total Mortgage Arena in nearby Bridgeport. In addition to sporting events, the arena will also host other campus events such as concerts and graduations.

The arena's $51 million construction was fully funded by donors and is named after former university trustee Leo Mahoney, whose three children attended Fairfield. The Mahoney family's donation marked the largest in school history. The playing court is named after former basketball coach and university athletic director George Bisacca, which was carried over from Alumni Hall.

== Memorable games ==
Fairfield guard Deon Perry hit a 70-foot buzzer beater to beat the Marist Red Foxes on February 6, 2025. The game was nationally televised on ESPNU.

== See also ==
- List of NCAA Division I basketball arenas
