= 2025–26 Manhattan Jaspers women's basketball team =

American college basketball season

2025–26 Manhattan Jaspers women's basketball
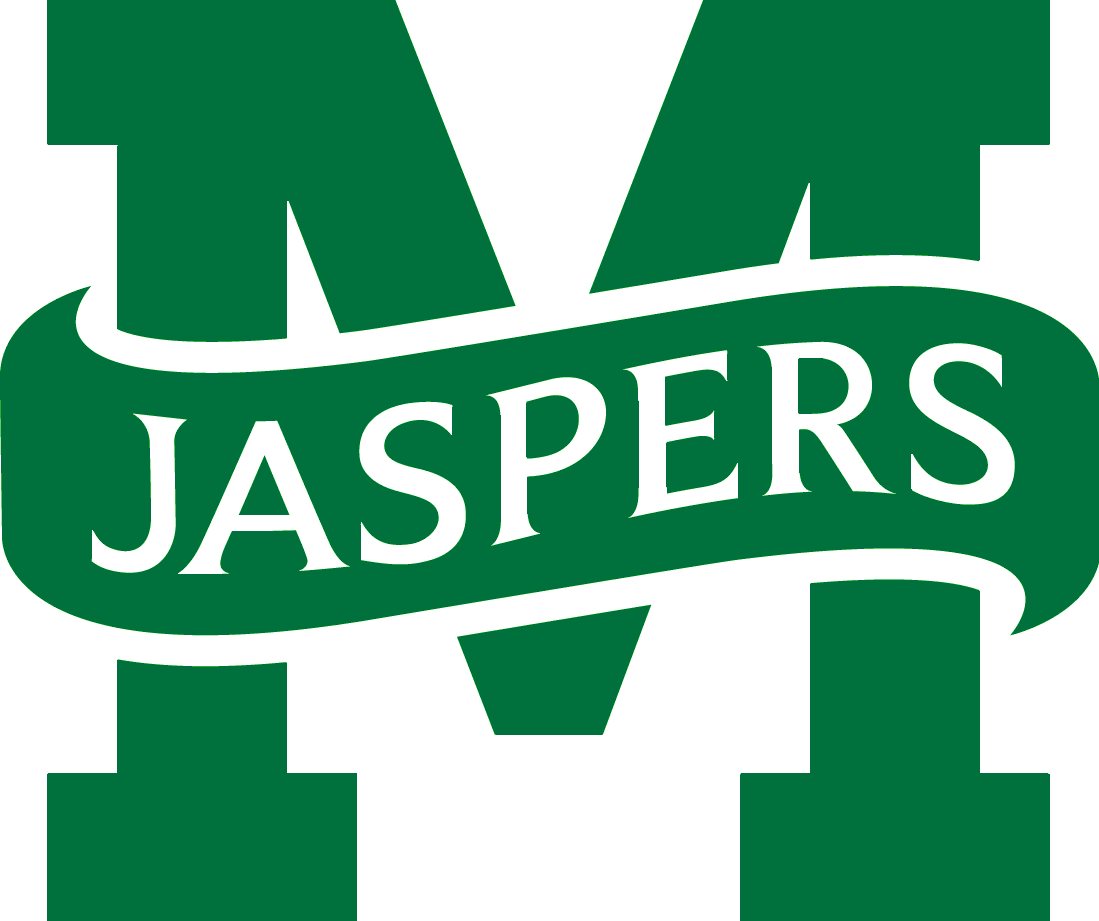
- Conference: Metro Atlantic Athletic Conference
- Record: 11–20 (10–10 MAAC)
- Head coach: Heather Vulin (10th season)
- Associate head coach: Callan Stores
- Assistant coaches: Cori Coleman; DeeDee Davis
- Home arena: Draddy Gymnasium

2025–26 MAAC women's basketball standings
	Conf.				Overall
Team	W		L	PCT	W		L	PCT
Quinnipiac	19	–	1	.950	27	–	7	.794
Fairfield †	19	–	1	.950	28	–	5	.848
Merrimack	15	–	5	.750	19	–	13	.594
Iona	12	–	8	.600	20	–	12	.625
Siena	11	–	9	.550	13	–	17	.433
Mount St. Mary's	11	–	9	.550	15	–	15	.500
Sacred Heart	10	–	10	.500	13	–	18	.419
Manhattan	10	–	10	.500	11	–	20	.355
Marist	8	–	12	.400	11	–	20	.355
Saint Peter's	6	–	14	.300	7	–	23	.233
Rider	5	–	15	.250	7	–	22	.241
Canisius	3	–	17	.150	5	–	24	.172
Niagara	1	–	19	.050	1	–	28	.034
† 2026 MAAC tournament winner

The 2025–26 Manhattan Jaspers women's basketball team represented Manhattan University during the 2025–26 NCAA Division I women's basketball season. The Jaspers, led by tenth-year head coach Heather Vulin, played their home games at Draddy Gymnasium in Riverdale, New York as members of the Metro Atlantic Athletic Conference.

== Previous season ==
The Jaspers finished the 2024–25 season 16–15, 9–11 in MAAC play, to finish in a four-way tie for sixth place. They defeated Canisius in the first round of the MAAC tournament before falling to top-seeded and eventual tournament champions Fairfield in the quarterfinals.

== Preseason ==
On September 30, 2025, the Metro Atlantic Athletic Conference released their preseason poll. Manhattan was picked to finish seventh in the conference.

=== Preseason rankings ===
MAAC Preseason Poll
Place	Team	Votes
1	Fairfield	169 (13)
2	Quinnipiac	155
3	Mount St. Mary's	132
4	Marist	128
5	Siena	103
6	Iona	100
7	Manhattan	95
8	Merrimack	76
9	Canisius	69
10	Saint Peter's	51
11	Niagara	48
12	Sacred Heart	43
13	Rider	14
(#) first-place votes

=== Preseason All-MAAC Teams ===
Preseason All-MAAC Teams
Team	Player	Position	Year
Third	Brianna Davis	Guard	Senior

== Roster ==
2025–26 Manhattan Jaspers women's basketball team
Players
Coaches

Pos.	#	Name	Height	Year	Previous school	Hometown
G	0	Brianna Davis	5 ft 8 in (1.73 m)	Sr	Queens College	Bronx, New York
G	1	Hana Mühl	5 ft 8 in (1.73 m)	Sr	Ball State	Zagreb, Croatia
F	3	Tatianna Collins	5 ft 10 in (1.78 m)	Fr	Hudson Catholic High School	Roselle, New Jersey
G	4	Johlana Tatum	5 ft 8 in (1.73 m)	Fr	Nazareth Regional High School	Brooklyn, New York
G	5	Celeste Harper	5 ft 8 in (1.73 m)	Fr	Kent School	Englewood, New Jersey
F	6	Kristina Juric	6 ft 2 in (1.88 m)	RS So	Kušlanova Gymnasium	Zagreb, Croatia
G	7	Autumn Taylor	5 ft 7 in (1.7 m)	Jr	Clarion	Twinsburg, Ohio
G	9	Elisa Solé Sanchez	5 ft 8 in (1.73 m)	GS	Converse	Sant Andreu de Llavaneres, Spain
G	10	Alyssa Costigan	6 ft 0 in (1.83 m)	RS Jr	Paul VI High School	Herndon, Virginia
G	13	Ella Chandler	6 ft 0 in (1.83 m)	RS Fr	Wilbraham & Monson Academy	Ballston Lake, New York
F	22	Agar Farrés Garcia	5 ft 11 in (1.8 m)	GS	Florida Memorial	Barcelona, Spain
G	33	Meghan Thompson	5 ft 8 in (1.73 m)	Fr	Mount Mansfield Union High School	Colchester, Vermont
F	44	Colette Mulderig	6 ft 4 in (1.93 m)	GS	Franklin Pierce	Scranton, Pennsylvania

Head coach

- Heather Vulin (Minnesota Morris)

Assistant coach(es)

- Callan Stores (Sacred Heart)
- Cori Coleman (Cleveland State)
- DeeDee Davis (Manhattan)

Legend

- (C) Team captain
- (S) Suspended
- (I) Ineligible
- (W) Walk-on
- Injured
- Current redshirt

Roster
Last update: June 23, 2026

== Schedule and results ==
Date time, TV	Rank^{#}	Opponent^{#}	Result	Record	Site (attendance) city, state
Non-conference regular season
November 3, 2025*; 7:00 pm, ESPN+		Rhode Island	L 38–56	0–1	Draddy Gymnasium (209); Riverdale, NY
November 7, 2025*; 8:00 pm, B1G+		at Minnesota	L 36–99	0–2	Williams Arena (2,904); Minneapolis, MN
November 12, 2025*; 7:00 pm, ESPN+		Fairleigh Dickinson	L 63–65	0–3	Draddy Gymnasium (274); Riverdale, NY
November 15, 2025*; 5:00 pm, MWN		at Air Force	L 54–67	0–4	Clune Arena (644); USAF Academy, CO
November 23, 2025*; 2:00 pm, ESPN+		at Fordham; Battle of the Bronx	L 62–65	0–5	Rose Hill Gymnasium (426); Bronx, NY
November 29, 2025*; 1:00 pm, ESPN+		at Navy; Navy Classic	L 52−59	0−6	Alumni Hall; Annapolis, MD
November 30, 2025*; 3:30 pm, ESPN+		vs. Liberty; Navy Classic	L 56−68	0−7	Alumni Hall (673); Annapolis, MD
December 3, 2025*; 7:00 pm, ESPN+		Columbia	L 38–84	0–8	Draddy Gymnasium (352); Riverdale, NY
December 7, 2025*; 1:00 pm, ESPN+		at NJIT	L 54–71	0–9	Wellness and Events Center (191); Newark, NJ
MAAC regular season
December 19, 2025; 11:00 am, ESPN+/NESN		at Quinnipiac	L 39–78	0–10 (0–1)	M&T Bank Arena (2,919); Hamden, CT
December 29, 2025; 7:00 pm, ESPN+		Fairfield	L 59–84	0–11 (0–2)	Draddy Gymnasium (212); Riverdale, NY
January 1, 2026; 3:00 pm, ESPN+		at Saint Peter's	W 60–45	1–11 (1–2)	Run Baby Run Arena (273); Jersey City, NJ
January 3, 2026; 2:00 pm, ESPN+		Marist	L 57−62	1−12 (1–3)	Draddy Gymnasium (306); Riverdale, NY
January 8, 2026; 11:00 am, ESPN+		at Canisius	W 69–43	2–12 (2–3)	Koessler Athletic Center (1,697); Buffalo, NY
January 10, 2026; 2:00 pm, ESPN+		at Niagara	W 74–53	3–12 (3–3)	Gallagher Center (251); Lewiston, NY
January 14, 2026; 11:00 am, ESPN+		Mount St. Mary's	W 68–59	4–12 (4–3)	Draddy Gymnasium (1,625); Riverdale, NY
January 17, 2026; 2:00 pm, ESPN+		at Fairfield	L 54–76	4–13 (4–4)	Leo D. Mahoney Arena (1,165); Fairfield, CT
January 19, 2026; 7:00 pm, ESPN+/SNY		Rider	W 58–46	5–13 (5–4)	Draddy Gymnasium (182); Riverdale, NY
January 24, 2026; 2:00 pm, ESPN+		Quinnipiac	L 56–74	5–14 (5–5)	Draddy Gymnasium (609); Riverdale, NY
January 29, 2026; 7:00 pm, ESPN+		at Sacred Heart	L 50–52	5–15 (5–6)	William H. Pitt Center (553); Fairfield, CT
January 31, 2026; 2:00 pm, ESPN+		Iona	L 51–65	5–16 (5–7)	Draddy Gymnasium (292); Riverdale, NY
February 5, 2026; 6:00 pm, ESPN+		at Rider	L 60–71	5–17 (5–8)	Alumni Gymnasium (326); Lawrenceville, NJ
February 7, 2026; 2:00 pm, ESPN+		at Siena	Postponed due to inclement weather		UHY Center; Loudonville, NY
February 8, 2026; 12:00 pm, ESPN+		Siena; Rescheduled from February 7	L 72–91	5–18 (5–9)	Draddy Gymnasium (220); Riverdale, NY
February 12, 2026; 7:00 pm, ESPN+		Niagara	W 60–42	6–18 (6–9)	Draddy Gymnasium (112); Riverdale, NY
February 14, 2026; 2:00 pm, ESPN+		Canisius	W 68–55	7–18 (7–9)	Draddy Gymnasium (181); Riverdale, NY
February 19, 2026; 7:00 pm, ESPN+		at Marist	W 66–61 ^{OT}	8–18 (8–9)	McCann Arena (767); Poughkeepsie, NY
February 21, 2026; 2:00 pm, ESPN+		Merrimack	W 82–67	9–18 (9–9)	Draddy Gymnasium (450); Riverdale, NY
February 26, 2026; 6:00 pm, ESPN+		at Iona	L 59–65	9–19 (9–10)	Hynes Athletics Center (656); New Rochelle, NY
February 28, 2026; 2:00 pm, ESPN+		Saint Peter's	W 68–49	10–19 (10–10)	Draddy Gymnasium (621); Riverdale, NY
MAAC tournament
March 5, 2026; 12:00 pm, ESPN+	(8)	vs. (9) Marist; First Round	W 64–55	11–19	Boardwalk Hall (662); Atlantic City, NJ
March 6, 2026; 12:00 pm, ESPN+	(8)	vs. (1) Quinnipiac; Quarterfinals	L 43–59	11–20	Boardwalk Hall (1,785); Atlantic City, NJ
*Non-conference game. ^{#}Rankings from AP Poll. (#) Tournament seedings in parentheses. All times are in Eastern.
