= 2025–26 Merrimack Warriors women's basketball team =

American college basketball season

2025–26 Merrimack Warriors women's basketball
- Conference: Metro Atlantic Athletic Conference
- Record: 19–13 (15–5 MAAC)
- Head coach: Kelly Morrone (6th season)
- Assistant coaches: Paige McCormick; Claudio Buratti; Victoria Lux; Didier Dinh
- Home arena: Lawler Arena

2025–26 MAAC women's basketball standings
	Conf.				Overall
Team	W		L	PCT	W		L	PCT
Quinnipiac	19	–	1	.950	27	–	7	.794
Fairfield †	19	–	1	.950	28	–	5	.848
Merrimack	15	–	5	.750	19	–	13	.594
Iona	12	–	8	.600	20	–	12	.625
Siena	11	–	9	.550	13	–	17	.433
Mount St. Mary's	11	–	9	.550	15	–	15	.500
Sacred Heart	10	–	10	.500	13	–	18	.419
Manhattan	10	–	10	.500	11	–	20	.355
Marist	8	–	12	.400	11	–	20	.355
Saint Peter's	6	–	14	.300	7	–	23	.233
Rider	5	–	15	.250	7	–	22	.241
Canisius	3	–	17	.150	5	–	24	.172
Niagara	1	–	19	.050	1	–	28	.034
† 2026 MAAC tournament winner

The 2025–26 Merrimack Warriors women's basketball team represented Merrimack College during the 2025–26 NCAA Division I women's basketball season. The Warriors, led by sixth-year head coach Kelly Morrone, played their home games at Lawler Arena, with two games at Hammel Court, in North Andover, Massachusetts as members of the Metro Atlantic Athletic Conference.

== Previous season ==
The Warriors finished the 2024–25 season 14–17, 9–11 in MAAC play, to finish in a four-way tie for sixth place. They defeated Siena, before falling to Quinnipiac in the semifinals of the MAAC tournament.

== Preseason ==
On September 30, 2025, the Metro Atlantic Athletic Conference released their preseason poll. Merrimack was picked to finish eighth in the conference.

=== Preseason rankings ===
MAAC Preseason Poll
Place	Team	Votes
1	Fairfield	169 (13)
2	Quinnipiac	155
3	Mount St. Mary's	132
4	Marist	128
5	Siena	103
6	Iona	100
7	Manhattan	95
8	Merrimack	76
9	Canisius	69
10	Saint Peter's	51
11	Niagara	48
12	Sacred Heart	43
13	Rider	14
(#) first-place votes

=== Preseason All-MAAC Teams ===
Preseason All-MAAC Teams
Team	Player	Position	Year
Second	Madison Roman	Forward	Junior

== Roster ==
2025–26 Merrimack Warriors women's basketball team
Players
Coaches

Pos.	#	Name	Height	Year	Previous school	Hometown
F	0	Madison Roman	6 ft 0 in (1.83 m)	Jr	Fairfield Ludlowe High School	Fairfield, Connecticut
G	1	Joi Williams	5 ft 5 in (1.65 m)	Fr	Cuyahoga Valley Christian Academy	Alliance, Ohio
G	2	Daria Shishkina	5 ft 11 in (1.8 m)	So	Spire Academy	Moscow, Russia
G	3	Makayla Thomas	5 ft 7 in (1.7 m)	Jr	SUNY Niagara	Brooklyn, New York
G	4	Denae Skelton	5 ft 7 in (1.7 m)	So	Utah State	West Kelowna, British Columbia
G	5	Mia Fiore	5 ft 10 in (1.78 m)	So	St. George's School	Narragansett, Rhode Island
G	10	Paloma Garcia	5 ft 6 in (1.68 m)	Jr	Proctor Academy	Corozal, Puerto Rico
F	11	Oralye Kiefer	6 ft 3 in (1.91 m)	GS	Northeastern	Wayland, Massachusetts
F	12	Claudia Gallegos	6 ft 2 in (1.88 m)	Sr	Southern Indiana	Naperville, Illinois
G	15	Se'Lah Reddick	5 ft 8 in (1.73 m)	Sr	Flagler College	Jacksonville, Florida
F	21	Cadence Johnson	6 ft 0 in (1.83 m)	Jr	St. Andrew's School	Mattapoisett, Massachusetts
G	22	Lydia Melaschenko	5 ft 7 in (1.7 m)	Sr	Capital Courts Academy	Ottawa, Ontario
G	24	Molly Manion	5 ft 11 in (1.8 m)	GS	Henderson High School	West Chester, Pennsylvania
G	30	Kristen Kelley	6 ft 1 in (1.85 m)	So	Marion L. Steele High School	Amherst, Ohio
F	32	Kylee Fears	6 ft 1 in (1.85 m)	RS So	Talawanda High School	Oxford, Ohio

Head coach

- Kelly Morrone (South Carolina)

Assistant coach(es)

- Paige McCormick (Merrimack)
- Claudio Buratti (John Cabot)
- Victoria Lux (Bentley)
- Didier Dinh (Salem State)

Legend

- (C) Team captain
- (S) Suspended
- (I) Ineligible
- (W) Walk-on
- Injured
- Current redshirt

Roster
Last update: June 18, 2026

== Schedule and results ==
Date time, TV	Rank^{#}	Opponent^{#}	Result	Record	Site (attendance) city, state
Non-conference regular season
November 4, 2025*; 7:00 pm, ESPN+		UMass Boston	W 97–46	1–0	Hammel Court (311); North Andover, MA
November 7, 2025*; 6:00 pm, ESPN+		at Rhode Island	L 46–84	1–1	Ryan Center (1,008); Kingston, RI
November 12, 2025*; 7:00 pm, ESPN+		at High Point	L 69–82	1–2	Qubein Center (738); High Point, NC
November 15, 2025*; 3:00 pm, ESPN+		Northeastern	W 83–65	2–2	Hammel Court (694); North Andover, MA
November 19, 2025*; 4:00 pm, ESPN+		Bryant	L 73−80	2−3	Lawler Arena (487); North Andover, MA
November 25, 2025*; 11:00 am, ACCNX		at Boston College	L 72−77	2−4	Conte Forum (5,167); Chestnut Hill, MA
December 2, 2025*; 6:00 pm, ESPN+		at Dartmouth	W 59–57	3–4	Leede Arena (603); Hanover, NH
December 5, 2025*; 11:00 am, ESPN+		at New Hampshire	L 61–65	3–5	Lundholm Gym (956); Durham, NH
December 9, 2025*; 7:00 pm, ESPN+		Brown	L 60–70	3–6	Lawler Arena (428); North Andover, MA
MAAC regular season
December 21, 2025; 2:00 pm, ESPN+		at Fairfield	L 65–84	3–7 (0–1)	Leo D. Mahoney Arena (730); Fairfield, CT
December 29, 2025; 2:00 pm, NESN/ESPN+		Mount St. Mary's	W 60–56	4–7 (1–1)	Lawler Arena (351); North Andover, MA
January 1, 2026; 2:00 pm, ESPN+		at Rider	W 72−54	5−7 (2–1)	Alumni Gymnasium (347); Lawrenceville, NJ
January 3, 2026; 12:00 pm, ESPN+		Saint Peter's	W 67–59	6–7 (3–1)	Lawler Arena (184); North Andover, MA
January 8, 2026; 7:00 pm, ESPN+		Marist	W 59–57 ^{OT}	7–7 (4–1)	Lawler Arena (150); North Andover, MA
January 10, 2026; 2:00 pm, ESPN+		at Siena	W 82–65	8–7 (5–1)	UHY Center (367); Loudonville, NY
January 14, 2026; 11:00 am, ESPN+		at Iona	L 51–58	8–8 (5–2)	Hynes Athletics Center (1,525); New Rochelle, NY
January 19, 2026; 2:00 pm, ESPN+		Quinnipiac	L 61–75	8–9 (5–3)	Lawler Arena (311); North Andover, MA
January 22, 2026; 7:00 pm, ESPN+		at Saint Peter's	W 66–59	9–9 (6–3)	Run Baby Run Arena (267); Jersey City, NJ
January 24, 2026; 1:00 pm, ESPN+		at Mount St. Mary's	W 81–68	10–9 (7–3)	Knott Arena (1,265); Emmitsburg, MD
January 29, 2026; 11:00 am, NESN/ESPN+		Iona	W 87–63	11–9 (8–3)	Lawler Arena (332); North Andover, MA
January 31, 2026; 2:00 pm, ESPN+		at Quinnipiac	L 53–80	11–10 (8–4)	M&T Bank Arena (556); Hamden, CT
February 5, 2026; 7:00 pm, ESPN+		Sacred Heart	W 69–47	12–10 (9–4)	Lawler Arena (325); North Andover, MA
February 7, 2026; 12:00 pm, NESN/ESPN+		Rider	W 73–37	13–10 (10–4)	Lawler Arena (372); North Andover, MA
February 12, 2026; 6:00 pm, ESPN+		at Marist	W 77–72 ^{OT}	14–10 (11–4)	McCann Arena (867); Poughkeepsie, NY
February 14, 2026; 2:00 pm, ESPN+		Siena	W 79–60	15–10 (12–4)	Lawler Arena (321); North Andover, MA
February 19, 2026; 7:00 pm, ESPN+		at Sacred Heart	W 62–57	16–10 (13–4)	William H. Pitt Center (634); Fairfield, CT
February 21, 2026; 2:00 pm, ESPN+		at Manhattan	L 67–82	16–11 (13–5)	Draddy Gymnasium (450); Riverdale, NY
February 26, 2026; 7:00 pm, ESPN+		Canisius	W 71–55	17–11 (14–5)	Lawler Arena (313); North Andover, MA
February 28, 2026; 12:00 pm, ESPN+		Niagara	W 60–44	18–11 (15–5)	Lawler Arena (287); North Andover, MA
MAAC tournament
March 7, 2026; 2:30 pm, ESPN+	(3)	vs. (6) Mount St. Mary's; Quarterfinals	W 62–48	19–11	Boardwalk Hall (937); Atlantic City, NJ
March 8, 2026; 2:30 pm, ESPN+	(3)	vs. (2) No. 25 Fairfield; Semifinals	L 48–65	19–12	Boardwalk Hall (1,059); Atlantic City, NJ
WNIT
March 19, 2026*; 7:00 pm, ESPN+		NJIT; First Round	L 65–68	19–13	Lawler Arena (317); North Andover, MA
*Non-conference game. ^{#}Rankings from AP Poll. (#) Tournament seedings in parentheses. All times are in Eastern.
