= 2025–26 Saint Peter's Peacocks women's basketball team =

American college basketball season

2025–26 Saint Peter's Peacocks women's basketball
- Conference: Metro Atlantic Athletic Conference
- Record: 7–23 (6–14 MAAC)
- Head coach: Jennifer Leedham (4th season)
- Associate head coach: David Jollon
- Assistant coaches: Johannah Leedham-Warner; Tay Hughes; Olivia Tucker
- Home arena: Run Baby Run Arena

2025–26 MAAC women's basketball standings
	Conf.				Overall
Team	W		L	PCT	W		L	PCT
Quinnipiac	19	–	1	.950	27	–	7	.794
Fairfield †	19	–	1	.950	28	–	5	.848
Merrimack	15	–	5	.750	19	–	13	.594
Iona	12	–	8	.600	20	–	12	.625
Siena	11	–	9	.550	13	–	17	.433
Mount St. Mary's	11	–	9	.550	15	–	15	.500
Sacred Heart	10	–	10	.500	13	–	18	.419
Manhattan	10	–	10	.500	11	–	20	.355
Marist	8	–	12	.400	11	–	20	.355
Saint Peter's	6	–	14	.300	7	–	23	.233
Rider	5	–	15	.250	7	–	22	.241
Canisius	3	–	17	.150	5	–	24	.172
Niagara	1	–	19	.050	1	–	28	.034
† 2026 MAAC tournament winner

The 2025–26 Saint Peter's Peacocks women's basketball team represented Saint Peter's University during the 2025–26 NCAA Division I women's basketball season. The Peacocks, led by fourth-year head coach Jennifer Leedham, played their home games at the Run Baby Run Arena in Jersey City, New Jersey, as members of the Metro Atlantic Athletic Conference.

== Previous season ==
The Peacocks finished the 2024–25 season 11–19, 9–11 in MAAC play, to finish in a four-way tie for sixth place. They were defeated by Iona in the first round of the MAAC tournament.

== Preseason ==
On September 30, 2025, the Metro Atlantic Athletic Conference released their preseason poll. Saint Peter's was picked to finish tenth in the conference.

=== Preseason rankings ===
MAAC Preseason Poll
Place	Team	Votes
1	Fairfield	169 (13)
2	Quinnipiac	155
3	Mount St. Mary's	132
4	Marist	128
5	Siena	103
6	Iona	100
7	Manhattan	95
8	Merrimack	76
9	Canisius	69
10	Saint Peter's	51
11	Niagara	48
12	Sacred Heart	43
13	Rider	14
(#) first-place votes

=== Preseason All-MAAC Teams ===
No players were named to the Preseason All-MAAC First, Second or Third Teams.

== Roster ==
2025–26 Saint Peter's Peacocks women's basketball team
Players
Coaches

Pos.	#	Name	Height	Year	Previous school	Hometown
G/F	0	Laila Grant	5 ft 8 in (1.73 m)	GS	Presbyterian	Derwood, Maryland
G/F	1	Nikola Zdenkova	5 ft 9 in (1.75 m)	RS Jr	Siena	Karlovy Vary, Czech Republic
G	2	Jada Mills	5 ft 9 in (1.75 m)	Jr	James Madison	Norwich, Connecticut
G	3	Louella Allana	5 ft 4 in (1.63 m)	Sr	Robert Morris	Laval, Quebec
G	4	Jayshlynn Vega	5 ft 5 in (1.65 m)	Fr	Central Pointe Christian Academy	Florida, Puerto Rico
G/F	7	Jineen Ayyash	5 ft 10 in (1.78 m)	So	Ocean Township High School	Ocean, New Jersey
G	12	Emily O'Connell	5 ft 7 in (1.7 m)	Jr	City of London Academy	London, England
F	13	De'Naya Rippey	5 ft 10 in (1.78 m)	So	Cheshire Academy	Brooklyn, New York
C	14	Carys Roy	6 ft 3 in (1.91 m)	Jr	Cowbridge Comprehensive School	Cowbridge, Wales
F	15	Layla Laws	6 ft 1 in (1.85 m)	GS	Saint Francis	Pine Beach, New Jersey
G	20	Reilly Sunday	5 ft 9 in (1.75 m)	Sr	Duquesne	Moon Township, Pennsylvania
G	22	Sierra Patricio	5 ft 9 in (1.75 m)	Fr	Capital Courts Academy	Toronto, Ontario
G	25	Eszter Turi	6 ft 1 in (1.85 m)	Jr	Siena	Budapest, Hungary

Head coach

- Jennifer Leedham (Franklin Pierce)

Assistant coach(es)

- David Jollon (Thomas Edison State)
- Johannah Leedham-Warner (Franklin Pierce)
- Tay Hughes (Saint Peter's)
- Olivia Tucker (Sacred Heart)

Legend

- (C) Team captain
- (S) Suspended
- (I) Ineligible
- (W) Walk-on
- Injured
- Current redshirt

Roster
Last update: June 25, 2026

== Schedule and results ==
Date time, TV	Rank^{#}	Opponent^{#}	Result	Record	Site (attendance) city, state
Non-conference regular season
November 4, 2025*; 7:00 pm, ESPN+		at Seton Hall	L 39–88	0–1	Walsh Gymnasium (757); South Orange, NJ
November 10, 2025*; 6:00 pm, ESPN+		at Fordham	L 56–70	0–2	Rose Hill Gymnasium (380); Bronx, NY
November 13, 2025*; 8:30 pm, ESPN+		at Lafayette	L 58–76	0–3	Kirby Sports Center (247); Easton, PA
November 19, 2025*; 6:00 pm, ESPN+		at NJIT	L 33–81	0–4	Wellness and Events Center (179); Newark, NJ
November 25, 2025*; 3:00 pm, ESPN+		Lehman	W 83–31	1–4	Run Baby Run Arena (243); Jersey City, NJ
November 30, 2025*; 3:00 pm, BTN		at Rutgers	L 39−57	1−5	Jersey Mike's Arena (1,765); Piscataway, NJ
December 3, 2025*; 11:00 am, ESPN+		Army	L 43−65	1−6	Run Baby Run Arena (673); Jersey City, NJ
December 7, 2025*; 7:00 pm, ESPN+		Monmouth	L 38–66	1–7	Run Baby Run Arena (258); Jersey City, NJ
December 10, 2025*; 6:00 pm, ESPN+		Fairleigh Dickinson	L 34–57	1–8	Run Baby Run Arena (235); Jersey City, NJ
MAAC regular season
December 19, 2025; 6:30 pm, ESPN+		at Canisius	W 61–49	2–8 (1–0)	Koessler Athletic Center (449); Buffalo, NY
December 21, 2025; 12:00 pm, ESPN+		at Niagara	W 81–72	3–8 (2–0)	Gallagher Center (152); Lewiston, NY
December 29, 2025; 3:00 pm, ESPN+		Quinnipiac	L 27–67	3–9 (2–1)	Run Baby Run Arena (253); Jersey City, NJ
January 1, 2026; 3:00 pm, ESPN+		Manhattan	L 45−60	3−10 (2–2)	Run Baby Run Arena (273); Jersey City, NJ
January 3, 2026; 12:00 pm, ESPN+		at Merrimack	L 59–67	3–11 (2–3)	Lawler Arena (184); North Andover, MA
January 8, 2026; 6:00 pm, ESPN+		Fairfield	L 62–84	3–12 (2–4)	Run Baby Run Arena (240); Jersey City, NJ
January 10, 2026; 2:00 pm, ESPN+		Mount St. Mary's	L 51–55	3–13 (2–5)	Run Baby Run Arena (248); Jersey City, NJ
January 17, 2026; 2:00 pm, ESPN+		at Siena	L 47–74	3–14 (2–6)	UHY Center (423); Loudonville, NY
January 19, 2026; 1:00 pm, ESPN+		at Iona	W 63–57	4–14 (3–6)	Hynes Athletics Center (579); New Rochelle, NY
January 22, 2026; 7:00 pm, ESPN+		Merrimack	L 59–66	4–15 (3–7)	Run Baby Run Arena (267); Jersey City, NJ
January 24, 2026; 2:00 pm, ESPN+		Rider	W 55–46	5–15 (4–7)	Run Baby Run Arena (233); Jersey City, NJ
January 31, 2026; 2:00 pm, ESPN+		at Mount St. Mary's	W 73–61	6–15 (5–7)	Knott Arena (1,282); Emmitsburg, MD
February 5, 2026; 7:00 pm, ESPN+		Siena	L 62–75	6–16 (5–8)	Run Baby Run Arena (359); Jersey City, NJ
February 7, 2026; 2:00 pm, ESPN+		at Marist	L 53–56	6–17 (5–9)	McCann Arena (1,273); Poughkeepsie, NY
February 12, 2026; 6:00 pm, ESPN+		at Rider	W 42–40	7–17 (6–9)	Alumni Gymnasium (292); Lawrenceville, NJ
February 14, 2026; 2:00 pm, ESPN+		Sacred Heart	L 61–63	7–18 (6–10)	Run Baby Run Arena (123); Jersey City, NJ
February 19, 2026; 7:00 pm, ESPN+		at Fairfield	L 30–62	7–19 (6–11)	Leo D. Mahoney Arena (741); Fairfield, CT
February 21, 2026; 2:00 pm, ESPN+		Iona	L 55–66	7–20 (6–12)	Run Baby Run Arena (180); Jersey City, NJ
February 26, 2026; 7:00 pm, ESPN+		Marist	L 45–48	7–21 (6–13)	Run Baby Run Arena (279); Jersey City, NJ
February 28, 2026; 2:00 pm, ESPN+		at Manhattan	L 49–68	7–22 (6–14)	Draddy Gymnasium (621); Riverdale, NY
MAAC tournament
March 5, 2026; 2:30 pm, ESPN+	(10)	vs. (7) Sacred Heart; First Round	L 34–47	7–23	Boardwalk Hall (662); Atlantic City, NJ
*Non-conference game. ^{#}Rankings from AP Poll. (#) Tournament seedings in parentheses. All times are in Eastern.
