= 2025–26 Marist Red Foxes women's basketball team =

American college basketball season

2025–26 Marist Red Foxes women's basketball
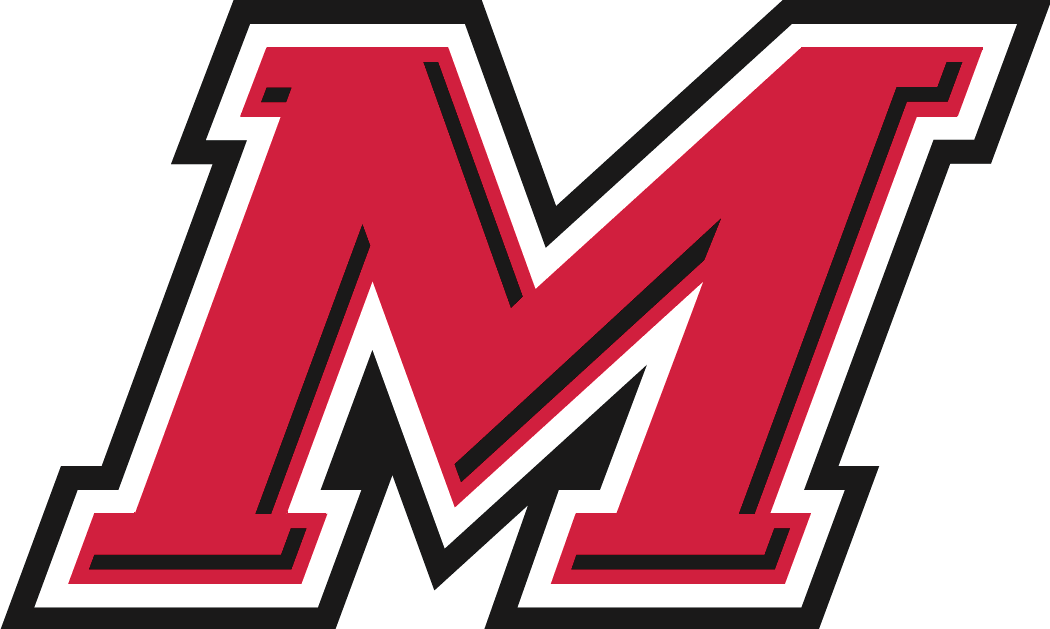
- Conference: Metro Atlantic Athletic Conference
- Record: 11–20 (8–12 MAAC)
- Head coach: Erin Doughty (3rd season)
- Assistant coaches: Nick Volchok; Brittany Shields; Moriah Crisp; Gabi Mendonca
- Home arena: McCann Arena

2025–26 MAAC women's basketball standings
	Conf.				Overall
Team	W		L	PCT	W		L	PCT
Quinnipiac	19	–	1	.950	27	–	7	.794
Fairfield †	19	–	1	.950	28	–	5	.848
Merrimack	15	–	5	.750	19	–	13	.594
Iona	12	–	8	.600	20	–	12	.625
Siena	11	–	9	.550	13	–	17	.433
Mount St. Mary's	11	–	9	.550	15	–	15	.500
Sacred Heart	10	–	10	.500	13	–	18	.419
Manhattan	10	–	10	.500	11	–	20	.355
Marist	8	–	12	.400	11	–	20	.355
Saint Peter's	6	–	14	.300	7	–	23	.233
Rider	5	–	15	.250	7	–	22	.241
Canisius	3	–	17	.150	5	–	24	.172
Niagara	1	–	19	.050	1	–	28	.034
† 2026 MAAC tournament winner

The 2025–26 Marist Red Foxes women's basketball team represented Marist University during the 2025–26 NCAA Division I women's basketball season. The Red Foxes, led by third-year head coach Erin Doughty, played their home games at McCann Arena in Poughkeepsie, New York as members of the Metro Atlantic Athletic Conference.

== Previous season ==
The Red Foxes finished the 2024–25 season 16–15, 11–9 in MAAC play, to finish in fifth place. They were defeated by Mount St. Mary's in the quarterfinals of the MAAC tournament.

== Preseason ==
On September 30, 2025, the Metro Atlantic Athletic Conference released their preseason poll. Marist was picked to finish fourth in the conference.

=== Preseason rankings ===
MAAC Preseason Poll
Place	Team	Votes
1	Fairfield	169 (13)
2	Quinnipiac	155
3	Mount St. Mary's	132
4	Marist	128
5	Siena	103
6	Iona	100
7	Manhattan	95
8	Merrimack	76
9	Canisius	69
10	Saint Peter's	51
11	Niagara	48
12	Sacred Heart	43
13	Rider	14
(#) first-place votes

=== Preseason All-MAAC Teams ===
Preseason All-MAAC Teams
Team	Player	Position	Year
Second	Lexie Tarul	Guard	(redshirt) Senior
Second	Danielle Williamsen	Guard	Sophomore

== Roster ==
2025–26 Marist Red Foxes women's basketball team
Players
Coaches

Pos.	#	Name	Height	Year	Previous school	Hometown
G	1	Malea Egan	5 ft 7 in (1.7 m)	Jr	Montana State	Sacramento, California
G	2	Jackie Piddock	5 ft 8 in (1.73 m)	Sr	South Jefferson High School	Adams, New York
G/F	3	Justine Henry	6 ft 0 in (1.83 m)	Fr	The Mary Louis Academy	Long Island, New York
G	4	Kasey Bretones	5 ft 11 in (1.8 m)	So	UMass	Linwood, New Jersey
G	5	Julia Corsentino	5 ft 8 in (1.73 m)	Jr	Rumson-Fair Haven High School	Fair Haven, New Jersey
F	10	Karly Fischer	6 ft 2 in (1.88 m)	Jr	Fairfield	Tappan, New York
G	11	Chloe Escanillas	5 ft 9 in (1.75 m)	So	Rutgers Prep	Edison, New Jersey
G	21	Danielle Williamsen	5 ft 7 in (1.7 m)	So	St. Joseph by the Sea High School	Staten Island, New York
F	22	Ciara Croker	6 ft 0 in (1.83 m)	Sr	The Ursuline School	New Rochelle, New York
G	23	Lexie Tarul	5 ft 10 in (1.78 m)	RS Sr	Fordham	Bronx, New York
F	24	Kate Robbins	6 ft 2 in (1.88 m)	Jr	Upper St. Clair High School	Pittsburgh, Pennsylvania
G	30	Morgan Tompkins	6 ft 0 in (1.83 m)	Sr	Red Hook High School	Red Hook, New York
G	33	Elle Bruschuk	5 ft 11 in (1.8 m)	So	Wright State	Villa Park, Illinois

Head coach

- Erin Doughty (Marist)

Assistant coach(es)

- Nick Volchok (Mercy)
- Brittany Shields (Pace)
- Moriah Crisp (UNC Wilmington)
- Gabi Mendonca (Connecticut)

Legend

- (C) Team captain
- (S) Suspended
- (I) Ineligible
- (W) Walk-on
- Injured
- Current redshirt

Roster
Last update: June 23, 2026

== Schedule and results ==
Date time, TV	Rank^{#}	Opponent^{#}	Result	Record	Site (attendance) city, state
Non-conference regular season
November 4, 2025*; 6:30 pm, ESPN+		at Albany	L 46–74	0–1	Broadview Center (1,338); Albany, NY
November 7, 2025*; 7:00 pm, ESPN+		Drexel	L 61–71	0–2	McCann Arena (731); Poughkeepsie, NY
November 11, 2025*; 7:00 pm, ESPN+		Bryant	L 56–66	0–3	McCann Arena (524); Poughkeepsie, NY
November 16, 2025*; 1:00 pm, ESPN+		Holy Cross	W 78–77 ^{OT}	1–3	McCann Arena (874); Poughkeepsie, NY
November 19, 2025*; 7:00 pm, ESPN+		Stony Brook	W 55–51	2–3	McCann Arena (752); Poughkeepsie, NY
November 24, 2025*; 7:00 pm, ESPN+		Monmouth	L 64−72 ^{OT}	2−4	McCann Arena (476); Poughkeepsie, NY
November 28, 2025*; 8:00 pm, ESPN+		vs. No. 5 LSU; Paradise Jam Reef Division semifinals	L 53−113	2−5	UVI Sports and Fitness Center (2,224); St. Thomas, USVI
November 29, 2025*; 5:00 pm, ESPN+		vs. Miami (OH); Paradise Jam Reef Division 3rd place game	L 37–63	2–6	UVI Sports and Fitness Center; St. Thomas, USVI
December 7, 2025*; 2:00 pm, ESPN+		at Lafayette	W 79–76 ^{OT}	3–6	Kirby Sports Center (314); Easton, PA
December 13, 2025*; 2:00 pm, ESPN+		at Binghamton	L 58–69	3–7	Events Center (1,405); Vestal, NY
MAAC regular season
December 19, 2025; 7:00 pm, ESPN+		at Mount St. Mary's	L 59–66	3–8 (0–1)	Knott Arena (466); Emmitsburg, MD
December 21, 2025; 5:00 pm, ESPN+		Quinnipiac	L 67–76	3–9 (0–2)	McCann Arena (535); Poughkeepsie, NY
December 29, 2025; 2:00 pm, ESPN+		Sacred Heart	W 57−55	4−9 (1–2)	McCann Arena (757); Poughkeepsie, NY
January 3, 2026; 2:00 pm, ESPN+		at Manhattan	W 62–57	5–9 (2–2)	Draddy Gymnasium (306); Riverdale, NY
January 8, 2026; 7:00 pm, ESPN+		at Merrimack	L 57–59 ^{OT}	5–10 (2–3)	Lawler Arena (150); North Andover, MA
January 10, 2026; 2:00 pm, ESPN+		Rider	W 62–49	6–10 (3–3)	McCann Arena (633); Poughkeepsie, NY
January 14, 2026; 11:00 am, ESPN+		Fairfield	L 49–63	6–11 (3–4)	McCann Arena (2,788); Poughkeepsie, NY
January 17, 2026; 2:00 pm, ESPN+		at Quinnipiac	L 47–59	6–12 (3–5)	M&T Bank Arena (756); Hamden, CT
January 19, 2026; 2:00 pm, ESPN+		at Sacred Heart	L 54–56	6–13 (3–6)	William H. Pitt Center (564); Fairfield, CT
January 22, 2026; 6:00 pm, ESPN+		Siena	W 75–72	7–13 (4–6)	McCann Arena (508); Poughkeepsie, NY
January 24, 2026; 1:00 pm, SNY/ESPN+		at Iona	L 64–65	7–14 (4–7)	Hynes Athletics Center (726); New Rochelle, NY
January 29, 2026; 5:00 pm, ESPN+		Canisius	W 60–53	8–14 (5–7)	McCann Arena (508); Poughkeepsie, NY
January 31, 2026; 2:00 pm, ESPN+		Niagara	W 71–52	9–14 (6–7)	McCann Arena (594); Poughkeepsie, NY
February 5, 2026; 7:00 pm, ESPN+		at Fairfield	L 48–109	9–15 (6–8)	Leo D. Mahoney Arena (1,015); Fairfield, CT
February 7, 2026; 2:00 pm, ESPN+		Saint Peter's	W 56–53	10–15 (7–8)	McCann Arena (1,273); Poughkeepsie, NY
February 12, 2026; 6:00 pm, ESPN+		Merrimack	L 72–77 ^{OT}	10–16 (7–9)	McCann Arena (867); Poughkeepsie, NY
February 14, 2026; 1:00 pm, ESPN+		at Rider	L 43–56	10–17 (7–10)	Alumni Gymnasium (512); Lawrenceville, NJ
February 19, 2026; 7:00 pm, ESPN+		Manhattan	L 61–66 ^{OT}	10–18 (7–11)	McCann Arena (767); Poughkeepsie, NY
February 26, 2026; 7:00 pm, ESPN+		at Saint Peter's	W 48–45	11–18 (8–11)	Run Baby Run Arena (279); Jersey City, NJ
February 28, 2026; 2:00 pm, ESPN+		at Siena	L 57–67	11–19 (8–12)	UHY Center (632); Loudonville, NY
MAAC tournament
March 5, 2026; 12:00 pm, ESPN+	(9)	vs. (8) Manhattan; First Round	L 55–64	11–20	Boardwalk Hall (662); Atlantic City, NJ
*Non-conference game. ^{#}Rankings from AP Poll. (#) Tournament seedings in parentheses. All times are in Eastern.
