= 2025–26 Quinnipiac Bobcats women's basketball team =

American college basketball season

2025–26 Quinnipiac Bobcats women's basketball
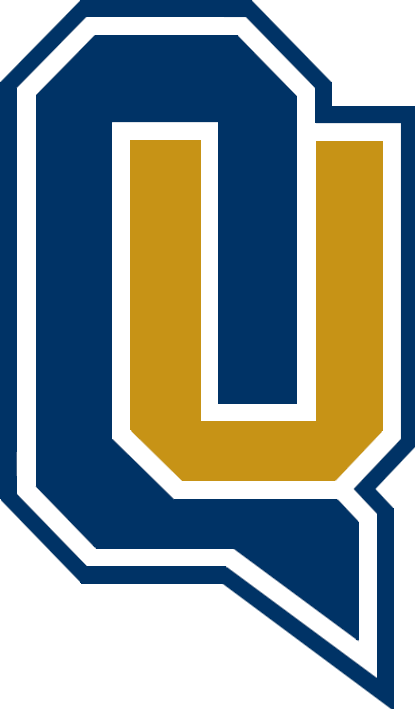

MAAC regular season co-champions

WBIT, Second Round
- Conference: Metro Atlantic Athletic Conference
- Record: 27–7 (19–1 MAAC)
- Head coach: Tricia Fabbri (31st season)
- Associate head coach: William Sullivan
- Assistant coaches: Cur'Tiera Haywood; Carly Fabbri
- Home arena: M&T Bank Arena

2025–26 MAAC women's basketball standings
	Conf.				Overall
Team	W		L	PCT	W		L	PCT
Quinnipiac	19	–	1	.950	27	–	7	.794
Fairfield †	19	–	1	.950	28	–	5	.848
Merrimack	15	–	5	.750	19	–	13	.594
Iona	12	–	8	.600	20	–	12	.625
Siena	11	–	9	.550	13	–	17	.433
Mount St. Mary's	11	–	9	.550	15	–	15	.500
Sacred Heart	10	–	10	.500	13	–	18	.419
Manhattan	10	–	10	.500	11	–	20	.355
Marist	8	–	12	.400	11	–	20	.355
Saint Peter's	6	–	14	.300	7	–	23	.233
Rider	5	–	15	.250	7	–	22	.241
Canisius	3	–	17	.150	5	–	24	.172
Niagara	1	–	19	.050	1	–	28	.034
† 2026 MAAC tournament winner

The 2025–26 Quinnipiac Bobcats women's basketball team represented Quinnipiac University during the 2025–26 NCAA Division I women's basketball season. The Bobcats, led by 31st-year head coach Tricia Fabbri, played their home games at M&T Bank Arena in Hamden, Connecticut as members of the Metro Atlantic Athletic Conference.

== Previous season ==
The Bobcats finished the 2024–25 season 28–5, 18–2 in MAAC play, to finish in second place. They defeated Iona in the quarterfinals of the MAAC tournament, and Merrimack in the semifinals, before falling to top-seeded Fairfield in the championship game. They received an automatic bid to the WBIT, where they would be defeated by Seton Hall in the first round.

== Preseason ==
On September 30, 2025, the Metro Atlantic Athletic Conference released their preseason poll. Quinnipiac was picked to finish second in the conference.

=== Preseason rankings ===
MAAC Preseason Poll
Place	Team	Votes
1	Fairfield	169 (13)
2	Quinnipiac	155
3	Mount St. Mary's	132
4	Marist	128
5	Siena	103
6	Iona	100
7	Manhattan	95
8	Merrimack	76
9	Canisius	69
10	Saint Peter's	51
11	Niagara	48
12	Sacred Heart	43
13	Rider	14
(#) first-place votes

=== Preseason All-MAAC Teams ===
Preseason All-MAAC Teams
Team	Player	Position	Year
First	Anna Foley	Forward/Center	Junior
First	Jackie Grisdale	Guard	Graduate Student
Second	Karson Martin	Guard	Junior

== Roster ==
2025–26 Quinnipiac Bobcats women's basketball team
Players
Coaches

Pos.	#	Name	Height	Year	Previous school	Hometown
G	2	Ella Ryan	5 ft 8 in (1.73 m)	Fr	Brentwood High School	Brentwood, Tennessee
G	3	Aniyah Neal	5 ft 11 in (1.8 m)	Fr	Loomis Chaffee School	Syracuse, New York
G	5	Paige Girardi	5 ft 9 in (1.75 m)	Jr	Warwick Valley High School	Warwick, New York
G	10	Maria Kealy	5 ft 9 in (1.75 m)	Jr	Loreto Letterkenny	Donegal, Ireland
F	12	Ella O'Donnell (C)	6 ft 3 in (1.91 m)	Sr	Rathdown School	Shankill, Ireland
F	14	Emma Lizotte	6 ft 3 in (1.91 m)	So	Thornton Academy	Saco, Maine
G	15	Karson Martin	5 ft 7 in (1.7 m)	Jr	Woodstock High School	Woodstock, Georgia
G	20	Sydney Ryan	5 ft 10 in (1.78 m)	Sr	Furman	Brentwood, Tennessee
G	21	Jackie Grisdale (C)	5 ft 9 in (1.75 m)	GS	Poland High School	Poland, Ohio
G	22	Reagan Sipla	6 ft 1 in (1.85 m)	So	St. Charles North High School	St. Charles, Illinois
F/C	23	Anna Foley (C)	6 ft 3 in (1.91 m)	Jr	Andover High School	Andover, Massachusetts
G	24	Ava Sollenne	5 ft 6 in (1.68 m)	Jr	St. Luke's School	Greenwich, Connecticut

Head coach

- Tricia Fabbri (Fairfield)

Assistant coach(es)

- William Sullivan (Connecticut)
- Cur'Tiera Haywood (Quinnipiac)
- Carly Fabbri (Quinnipiac)

Legend

- (C) Team captain
- (S) Suspended
- (I) Ineligible
- (W) Walk-on
- Injured
- Current redshirt

Roster
Last update: June 16, 2026

== Schedule and results ==
Date time, TV	Rank^{#}	Opponent^{#}	Result	Record	Site (attendance) city, state
Non-conference regular season
November 3, 2025*; 6:00 pm, ESPN+		at Boston University	W 65–55	1–0	Case Gym (845); Boston, MA
November 6, 2025*; 7:00 pm, B1G+		at Rutgers	L 55–64	1–1	Jersey Mike's Arena (1,548); Piscataway, NJ
November 11, 2025*; 5:00 pm, ESPN+		St. John's	L 51–53	1–2	M&T Bank Arena (537); Hamden, CT
November 18, 2025*; 5:00 pm, ESPN+		at Yale	W 69–46	2–2	John J. Lee Amphitheater (354); New Haven, CT
November 21, 2025*; 5:00 pm, ESPN+		Charleston	L 71−75	2−3	M&T Bank Arena (458); Hamden, CT
November 23, 2025*; 2:00 pm, ESPN+		Colgate	W 77−50	3−3	M&T Bank Arena (409); Hamden, CT
December 3, 2025*; 1:00 pm, ACCNX		at Boston College	W 76–49	4–3	Conte Forum (617); Chestnut Hill, MA
December 6, 2025*; 1:00 pm, ESPN+		at Cornell	W 68–47	5–3	Newman Arena; Ithaca, NY
December 14, 2025*; 1:00 pm, ESPN+/NESN+		Maine	L 55–63	5–4	M&T Bank Arena (263); Hamden, CT
MAAC regular season
December 19, 2025; 11:00 am, ESPN+/NESN		Manhattan	W 78–39	6–4 (1–0)	M&T Bank Arena (2,919); Hamden, CT
December 21, 2025; 5:00 pm, ESPN+		at Marist	W 76–67	7–4 (2–0)	McCann Arena (535); Poughkeepsie, NY
December 29, 2025; 3:00 pm, ESPN+		at Saint Peter's	W 67−27	8−4 (3–0)	Run Baby Run Arena (253); Jersey City, NJ
January 1, 2026; 2:00 pm, ESPN+/NESN		Iona	W 80–54	9–4 (4–0)	M&T Bank Arena (487); Hamden, CT
January 3, 2026; 2:00 pm, ESPN+		at Rider	W 68–56	10–4 (5–0)	Alumni Gymnasium (386); Lawrenceville, NJ
January 8, 2026; 11:00 am, ESPN+		at Mount St. Mary's	W 70–44	11–4 (6–0)	Knott Arena (537); Emmitsburg, MD
January 10, 2026; 3:00 pm, ESPN+		Sacred Heart	W 65–49	12–4 (7–0)	M&T Bank Arena (676); Hamden, CT
January 17, 2026; 2:00 pm, ESPN+		Marist	W 59–47	13–4 (8–0)	M&T Bank Arena (756); Hamden, CT
January 19, 2026; 2:00 pm, ESPN+		at Merrimack	W 75–61	14–4 (9–0)	Lawler Arena (311); North Andover, MA
January 22, 2026; 6:00 pm, ESPN+		Mount St. Mary's	W 56–43	15–4 (10–0)	M&T Bank Arena (394); Hamden, CT
January 24, 2026; 2:00 pm, ESPN+		at Manhattan	W 74–56	16–4 (11–0)	Draddy Gymnasium (609); Riverdale, NY
January 29, 2026; 7:00 pm, ESPNU		at Fairfield	W 72–58	17–4 (12–0)	Leo D. Mahoney Arena (1,491); Fairfield, CT
January 31, 2026; 2:00 pm, ESPN+		Merrimack	W 80–53	18–4 (13–0)	M&T Bank Arena (556); Hamden, CT
February 5, 2026; 6:30 pm, ESPN+		at Canisius	W 73–55	19–4 (14–0)	Koessler Athletic Center (457); Buffalo, NY
February 7, 2026; 2:00 pm, ESPN+		at Niagara	W 89–45	20–4 (15–0)	Gallagher Center (386); Lewiston, NY
February 12, 2026; 6:00 pm, ESPN+		Siena	W 62–40	21–4 (16–0)	M&T Bank Arena (310); Hamden, CT
February 14, 2026; 4:00 pm, ESPN+		Fairfield	L 63–75	21–5 (16–1)	M&T Bank Arena (1,307); Hamden, CT
February 21, 2026; 2:00 pm, ESPN+		at Sacred Heart	W 55–39	22–5 (17–1)	William H. Pitt Center (805); Fairfield, CT
February 26, 2026; 6:00 pm, ESPN+		Niagara	W 54–38	23–5 (18–1)	M&T Bank Arena (437); Hamden, CT
February 28, 2026; 2:00 pm, ESPN+		Canisius	W 75–37	24–5 (19–1)	M&T Bank Arena (663); Hamden, CT
MAAC tournament
March 6, 2026; 12:00 pm, ESPN+	(1)	vs. (8) Manhattan; Quarterfinals	W 59–43	25–5	Boardwalk Hall; Atlantic City, NJ
March 8, 2026; 12:00 pm, ESPN+	(1)	vs. (4) Iona; Semifinals	W 63–62	26–5	Boardwalk Hall; Atlantic City, NJ
March 9, 2026; 6:00 pm, ESPN+	(1)	vs. (2) Fairfield; Championship	L 44–51	26–6	Boardwalk Hall (826); Atlantic City, NJ
WBIT
March 19, 2026*; 7:00 pm, ESPN+		at (3) George Mason; First Round	W 71–64	27–6	EagleBank Arena (511); Fairfax, VA
March 22, 2026*; 5:00 pm, ESPN+		at (2) Stanford; Second Round	L 69–81	27–7	Maples Pavilion (874); Stanford, CA
*Non-conference game. ^{#}Rankings from AP Poll. (#) Tournament seedings in parentheses. All times are in Eastern.
