= 2026 MAAC women's basketball tournament =

American college basketball tournament

- Classification: Division I
- Season: 2025–26
- Teams: 10
- Site: Jim Whelan Boardwalk Hall; Atlantic City, New Jersey
- Champions: Fairfield (7th title)
- Winning coach: Carly Thibault-DuDonis (3rd title)
- Television: ESPN+,

2025–26 MAAC women's basketball standings
	Conf.				Overall
Team	W		L	PCT	W		L	PCT
Quinnipiac	19	–	1	.950	27	–	7	.794
Fairfield †	19	–	1	.950	28	–	5	.848
Merrimack	15	–	5	.750	19	–	13	.594
Iona	12	–	8	.600	20	–	12	.625
Siena	11	–	9	.550	13	–	17	.433
Mount St. Mary's	11	–	9	.550	15	–	15	.500
Sacred Heart	10	–	10	.500	13	–	18	.419
Manhattan	10	–	10	.500	11	–	20	.355
Marist	8	–	12	.400	11	–	20	.355
Saint Peter's	6	–	14	.300	7	–	23	.233
Rider	5	–	15	.250	7	–	22	.241
Canisius	3	–	17	.150	5	–	24	.172
Niagara	1	–	19	.050	1	–	28	.034
† 2026 MAAC tournament winner

The 2026 Metro Atlantic Athletic Conference women's basketball tournament was the postseason women's basketball tournament for the Metro Atlantic Athletic Conference for the 2025–26 NCAA Division I women's basketball season. The tournament was played March 5–10, 2026, at the Jim Whelan Boardwalk Hall in Atlantic City, New Jersey. The tournament winner, Fairfield received the conference's automatic bid to the 2026 NCAA Division I women's basketball tournament.

This was the last conference tournament under the Metro Atlantic Athletic Conference name. In July 2026, the conference will rebrand as the Metro Conference.

== Seeds ==
Only the top 10 teams in the conference participated in the tournament. The top six teams received byes to the quarterfinals. Teams were seeded by record within the conference, with a tiebreaker system to seed teams with identical conference records.

Seed	School	Conference	Tiebreaker
1	Quinnipiac	19–1	2–0 vs. Merrimack
2	Fairfield	19–1	1–0 vs. Merrimack
3	Merrimack	15–5	
4	Iona	12–8	
5	Siena	11–9	1–0 vs. Mount St. Mary's
6	Mount St. Mary's	11–9	0–1 vs. Siena
7	Sacred Heart	10–10	1–0 vs Manhattan
8	Manhattan	10–10	0–1 vs. Sacred Heart
9	Marist	8–12	
10	Saint Peter's	6–14	
DNQ	Rider	5–15	
DNQ	Canisius	3–17	
DNQ	Niagara	1–19	

== Schedule ==
Session	Game	Time*	Matchup	Score	Attendance	Television
First round – Thursday, March 5
1	1	Noon	No. 8 Manhattan vs. No. 9 Marist	64–55		ESPN+
1	2	2:30 p.m.	No. 7 Sacred Heart vs. No. 10 Saint Peter's	47–34		ESPN+
Quarterfinals – Friday, March 6
2	3	Noon	No. 1 Quinnipiac vs. No. 8 Manhattan	59–43	1,785	ESPN+
2	4	2:30 p.m.	No. 2 Fairfield vs. No. 7 Sacred Heart	69–53	1,785	ESPN+
Quarterfinals – Saturday, March 7
3	5	Noon	No. 4 Iona vs. No. 5 Siena	59–50	937	ESPN+
3	6	2:30 p.m.	No. 3 Merrimack vs. No. 6 Mount St. Mary's	62–48	937	ESPN+
Semifinals – Sunday, March 8
4	7	Noon	No. 1 Quinnipiac vs. No. 4 Iona	63–62^{OT}	1,059	ESPN+
4	8	2:30 p.m.	No. 2 Fairfield vs. No. 3 Merrimack	65–48	1,059	ESPN+
Championship – Monday, March 9
5	9	6:00 p.m.	No. 1 Quinnipiac vs. No. 2 Fairfield	44–51	826	ESPN+
*Game times in EST. Rankings denote tournament seeding.

== Bracket ==
First round March 5 ESPN+
8	Manhattan	64
9	Marist	55
7	Sacred Heart	47
10	Saint Peter's	34

Quarterfinals; March 6–7; ESPN+
1	Quinnipiac	59
8	Manhattan	43
4	Iona	59
5	Siena	50
2	25 Fairfield	69
7	Sacred Heart	53
3	Merrimack	62
6	Mount St. Mary's	48

Semifinals; March 8 ESPN+
1	Quinnipiac	63*
4	Iona	62
2	25 Fairfield	65
3	Merrimack	48

Championship; March 9
1	Quinnipiac	44
2	Fairfield	51

* denotes overtime period

== See also ==
- 2026 MAAC men's basketball tournament
