= 2025–26 Mount St. Mary's Mountaineers women's basketball team =

American college basketball season

2025–26 Mount St. Mary's Mountaineers women's basketball
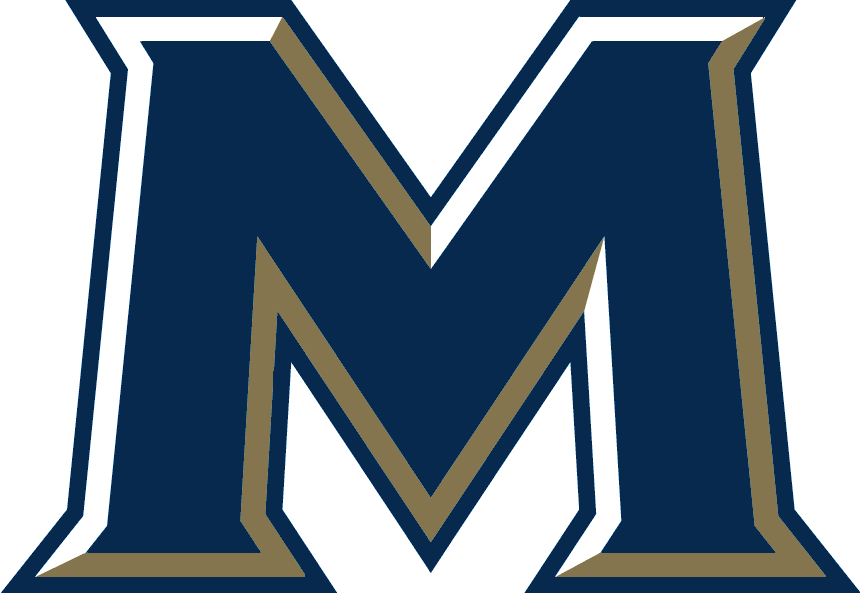
- Conference: Metro Atlantic Athletic Conference
- Record: 15–15 (11–9 MAAC)
- Head coach: Antoine White (5th season)
- Assistant coaches: Kelsey Funderburgh; Danielle Durjan; Riley Maye
- Home arena: Knott Arena

2025–26 MAAC women's basketball standings
	Conf.				Overall
Team	W		L	PCT	W		L	PCT
Quinnipiac	19	–	1	.950	27	–	7	.794
Fairfield †	19	–	1	.950	28	–	5	.848
Merrimack	15	–	5	.750	19	–	13	.594
Iona	12	–	8	.600	20	–	12	.625
Siena	11	–	9	.550	13	–	17	.433
Mount St. Mary's	11	–	9	.550	15	–	15	.500
Sacred Heart	10	–	10	.500	13	–	18	.419
Manhattan	10	–	10	.500	11	–	20	.355
Marist	8	–	12	.400	11	–	20	.355
Saint Peter's	6	–	14	.300	7	–	23	.233
Rider	5	–	15	.250	7	–	22	.241
Canisius	3	–	17	.150	5	–	24	.172
Niagara	1	–	19	.050	1	–	28	.034
† 2026 MAAC tournament winner

The 2025–26 Mount St. Mary's Mountaineers women's basketball team represented Mount St. Mary's University during the 2025–26 NCAA Division I women's basketball season. The Mountaineers, led by fifth-year head coach Antoine White, played their home games at Knott Arena in Emmitsburg, Maryland as members of the Metro Atlantic Athletic Conference (MAAC). They finished the season 15–15, 11–9 in MAAC play, to finish in a tie for fifth place. The Mountaineers lost to Merrimack in the quarterfinals of the MAAC tournament.

== Previous season ==
The Mountaineers finished the 2024–25 season 15–16, 12–8 in MAAC play, to finish in fourth place. They defeated Marist before falling to top-seeded and eventual tournament champions Fairfield in the semifinals of the MAAC tournament.

== Preseason ==
On September 30, 2025, the Metro Atlantic Athletic Conference released their preseason poll. Mount St. Mary's was picked to finish third in the conference.

=== Preseason rankings ===
MAAC preseason poll
Place	Team	Votes
1	Fairfield	169 (13)
2	Quinnipiac	155
3	Mount St. Mary's	132
4	Marist	128
5	Siena	103
6	Iona	100
7	Manhattan	95
8	Merrimack	76
9	Canisius	69
10	Saint Peter's	51
11	Niagara	48
12	Sacred Heart	43
13	Rider	14
(#) first-place votes

=== Preseason All-MAAC Teams ===
Preseason All-MAAC Teams
Team	Player	Position	Year
Second	Gabrielle Kennerly	Guard	(redshirt) Sophomore

== Roster ==
2025–26 Mount St. Mary's Mountaineers women's basketball team
Players
Coaches

Pos.	#	Name	Height	Year	Previous school	Hometown
G	0	Nyodie Guerard	5 ft 8 in (1.73 m)	So	Cégep de Sainte-Foy	Quebec City, QC
F	1	Berlynn Carlson	6 ft 3 in (1.91 m)	Fr	Mountainside High School	Beaverton, OR
G	2	Erin Edmonds	5 ft 10 in (1.78 m)	Fr	Hopewell High School	Hopewell, VA
G	3	Wesleigh Ferguson	6 ft 0 in (1.83 m)	So	IMG Academy	Benton, AR
F	5	Lenora Nkangwen	6 ft 2 in (1.88 m)	So	Connelly School of the Holy Child	Upper Marlboro, MD
G	7	Alana Powell	5 ft 8 in (1.73 m)	Jr	Omaha	Haymarket, VA
F	8	Zaria Harleaux	6 ft 1 in (1.85 m)	GS	Xavier (LA)	Baton Rouge, LA
F	10	Teodora Ivanovic	6 ft 3 in (1.91 m)	RS Fr	Central Pointe Christian Academy	Šimanovci, Serbia
G	11	Kayla Lindsey	5 ft 9 in (1.75 m)	Jr	Barry	Norcross, GA
G	12	Giana Hoddinott	5 ft 9 in (1.75 m)	RS Jr	Delone Catholic High School	Littlestown, PA
C	14	Amber Bullard	6 ft 4 in (1.93 m)	Jr	Harcum College	Philadelphia, PA
G	15	Gabrielle Kennerly	5 ft 9 in (1.75 m)	RS So	Howard High School	Charlotte, NC
F	20	Jaedyn Jamison	6 ft 1 in (1.85 m)	RS Sr	Franklin County High School	Rocky Mount, VA
F	21	Mikaela Parris	6 ft 0 in (1.83 m)	Sr	Mississippi Valley State	Toronto, ON
G	35	Deniz Torgut	5 ft 10 in (1.78 m)	RS Jr	VCU	İzmir, Turkey

Head coach

- Antoine White (Southern Vermont)

Assistant coach(es)

- Kelsey Funderburgh (Walsh)
- Danielle Durjan (Towson)
- Riley Maye (Norfolk State)

Legend

- (C) Team captain
- (S) Suspended
- (I) Ineligible
- (W) Walk-on
- Injured
- Current redshirt

Roster
Last update: June 22, 2026

== Schedule and results ==
Date time, TV	Rank^{#}	Opponent^{#}	Result	Record	Site (attendance) city, state
Non-conference regular season
November 4, 2025*; 6:00 p.m., ESPN+		at No. 24т Richmond	L 49–83	0–1	Robins Center (1,251); Richmond, VA
November 8, 2025*; 1:00 p.m., ACCNX		at Pittsburgh	L 52–66	0–2	Petersen Events Center (708); Pittsburgh, PA
November 12, 2025*; 6:00 p.m., ESPN+		at Bucknell	L 45–49	0–3	Sojka Pavilion (340); Lewisburg, PA
November 15, 2025*; 3:00 p.m., ESPN+		Morgan State	W 69–47	1–3	Knott Arena (1,521); Emmitsburg, MD
November 20, 2025*; 7:00 p.m., ESPN+		at Loyola (MD)	W 69–50	2–3	Reitz Arena (310); Baltimore, MD
November 26, 2025*; 1:00 p.m., ESPN+		Maryland Eastern Shore	L 59−67	2−4	Knott Arena (446); Emmitsburg, MD
December 3, 2025*; 7:00 p.m., B1G+		at No. 7 Maryland	L 44−92	2−5	Xfinity Center (4,872); College Park, MD
December 7, 2025*; 2:00 p.m., ESPN+		Lehigh	W 75–64	3–5	Knott Arena (589); Emmitsburg, MD
December 15, 2025*; 7:00 p.m., ESPN+		Mercyhurst	W 81–52	4–5	Knott Arena (471); Emmitsburg, MD
MAAC regular season
December 19, 2025; 7:00 p.m., ESPN+		Marist	W 66–59	5–5 (1–0)	Knott Arena (466); Emmitsburg, MD
December 21, 2025; 3:00 p.m., ESPN+		Iona	W 65–55	6–5 (2–0)	Knott Arena (882); Emmitsburg, MD
December 29, 2025; 2:00 p.m., ESPN+		at Merrimack	L 56–60	6–6 (2–1)	Lawler Arena (351); North Andover, MA
January 1, 2026; 2:00 p.m., ESPN+		at Siena	L 59−69	6−7 (2–2)	UHY Center (405); Loudonville, NY
January 8, 2026; 11:00 a.m., ESPN+		Quinnipiac	L 44–70	6–8 (2–3)	Knott Arena (537); Emmitsburg, MD
January 10, 2026; 2:00 p.m., ESPN+		at Saint Peter's	W 55–51	7–8 (3–3)	Run Baby Run Arena (248); Jersey City, NJ
January 14, 2026; 11:00 a.m., ESPN+		at Manhattan	L 59–68	7–9 (3–4)	Draddy Gymnasium (1,625); Riverdale, NY
January 17, 2026; 1:00 p.m., ESPN+		Canisius	W 71–64	8–9 (4–4)	Knott Arena (729); Emmitsburg, MD
January 19, 2026; 1:00 p.m., ESPN+		Niagara	W 62–49	9–9 (5–4)	Knott Arena (638); Emmitsburg, MD
January 22, 2026; 6:00 p.m., ESPN+		at Quinnipiac	L 43–56	9–10 (5–5)	M&T Bank Arena (394); Hamden, CT
January 24, 2026; 1:00 p.m., ESPN+/Monumental		Merrimack	L 68–81	9–11 (5–6)	Knott Arena (1,265); Emmitsburg, MD
January 29, 2026; 6:00 p.m., ESPN+		at Rider	W 70–59	10–11 (6–6)	Alumni Gymnasium (314); Lawrenceville, NJ
January 31, 2026; 2:00 p.m., ESPN+		Saint Peter's	L 61–73	10–12 (6–7)	Knott Arena (1,282); Emmitsburg, MD
February 5, 2026; 6:00 p.m., ESPN+		at Iona	W 63–62	11–12 (7–7)	Hynes Athletics Center (546); New Rochelle, NY
February 7, 2026; 1:00 p.m., ESPN+		at Sacred Heart	W 68–63 ^{OT}	12–12 (8–7)	William H. Pitt Center (815); Fairfield, CT
February 12, 2026; 7:00 p.m., ESPN+/Monumental		Fairfield	L 43–69	12–13 (8–8)	Knott Arena (956); Emmitsburg, MD
February 19, 2026; 6:00 p.m., ESPN+		at Niagara	W 76–57	13–13 (9–8)	Gallagher Center (307); Lewiston, NY
February 21, 2026; 1:00 p.m., ESPN+		at Canisius	L 63–68 ^{OT}	13–14 (9–9)	Koessler Athletic Center (453); Buffalo, NY
February 26, 2026; 7:00 p.m., ESPN+		Sacred Heart	W 66–61	14–14 (10–9)	Knott Arena (744); Emmitsburg, MD
February 28, 2026; 1:00 p.m., ESPN+		Rider	W 54–46	15–14 (11–9)	Knott Arena (548); Emmitsburg, MD
MAAC tournament
March 7, 2026; 2:30 p.m., ESPN+	(6)	vs. (3) Merrimack; Quarterfinals	L 48–62	15–15	Boardwalk Hall (937); Atlantic City, NJ
*Non-conference game. ^{#}Rankings from AP poll. (#) Tournament seedings in parentheses. All times are in Eastern.
