= 2025–26 Iona Gaels women's basketball team =

American college basketball season

2025–26 Iona Gaels women's basketball
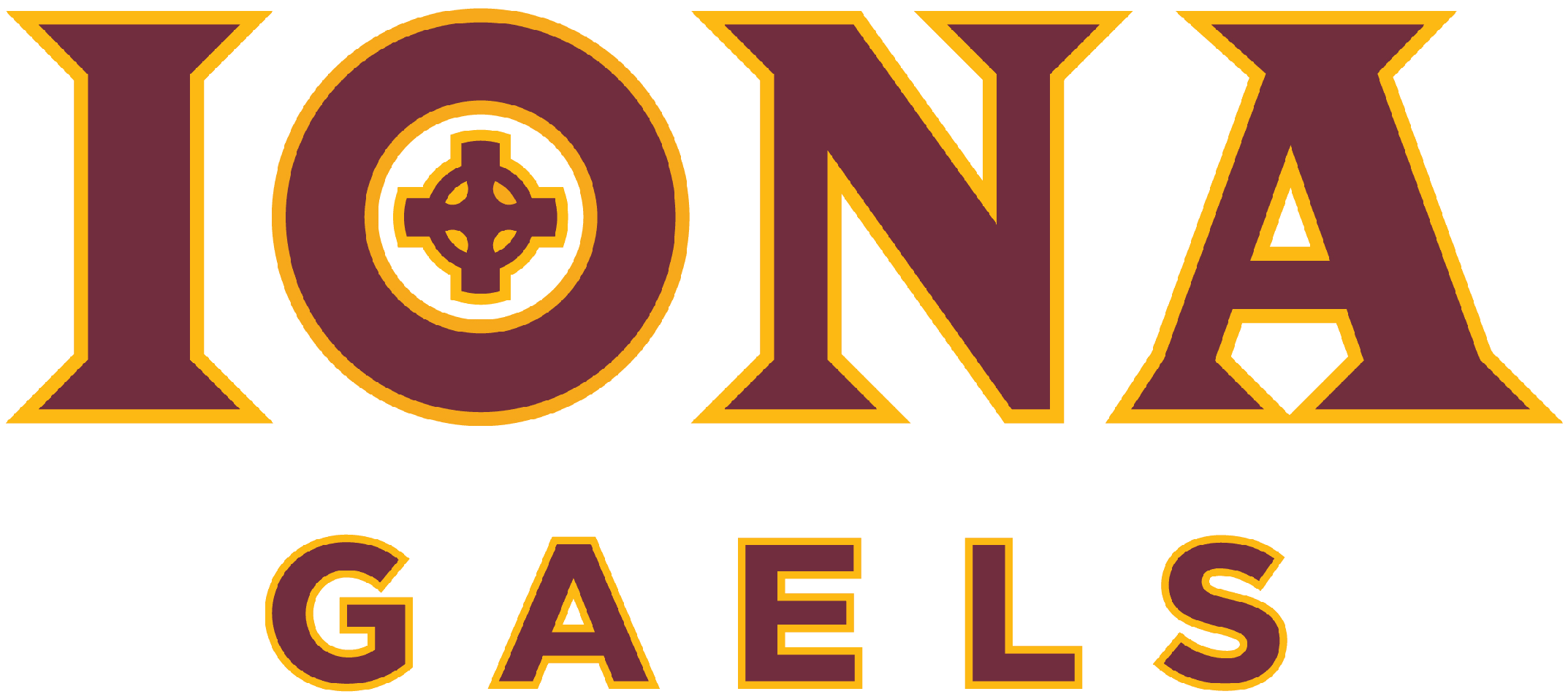
- Conference: Metro Atlantic Athletic Conference
- Record: 20–12 (12–8 MAAC)
- Head coach: Angelika Szumilo (3rd season)
- Assistant coaches: Aaron Gratch; Christian Mordi; Madison Stanley
- Home arena: Hynes Athletics Center

2025–26 MAAC women's basketball standings
	Conf.				Overall
Team	W		L	PCT	W		L	PCT
Quinnipiac	19	–	1	.950	27	–	7	.794
Fairfield †	19	–	1	.950	28	–	5	.848
Merrimack	15	–	5	.750	19	–	13	.594
Iona	12	–	8	.600	20	–	12	.625
Siena	11	–	9	.550	13	–	17	.433
Mount St. Mary's	11	–	9	.550	15	–	15	.500
Sacred Heart	10	–	10	.500	13	–	18	.419
Manhattan	10	–	10	.500	11	–	20	.355
Marist	8	–	12	.400	11	–	20	.355
Saint Peter's	6	–	14	.300	7	–	23	.233
Rider	5	–	15	.250	7	–	22	.241
Canisius	3	–	17	.150	5	–	24	.172
Niagara	1	–	19	.050	1	–	28	.034
† 2026 MAAC tournament winner

The 2025–26 Iona Gaels women's basketball team represented Iona University during the 2025–26 NCAA Division I women's basketball season. The Gaels, led by third-year head coach Angelika Szumilo, played their home games at the Hynes Athletics Center in New Rochelle, New York as members of the Metro Atlantic Athletic Conference.

== Previous season ==
The Gaels finished the 2024–25 season 11–21, 8–12 in MAAC play, to finish in tenth place. They upset Saint Peter's in the first round, before falling to Quinnipiac in the quarterfinals of the MAAC tournament.

== Preseason ==
On September 30, 2025, the Metro Atlantic Athletic Conference released their preseason poll. Iona was picked to finish sixth in the conference.

=== Preseason rankings ===
MAAC Preseason Poll
Place	Team	Votes
1	Fairfield	169 (13)
2	Quinnipiac	155
3	Mount St. Mary's	132
4	Marist	128
5	Siena	103
6	Iona	100
7	Manhattan	95
8	Merrimack	76
9	Canisius	69
10	Saint Peter's	51
11	Niagara	48
12	Sacred Heart	43
13	Rider	14
(#) first-place votes

=== Preseason All-MAAC Teams ===
Preseason All-MAAC Teams
Team	Player	Position	Year
Second	Ella Fajardo	Guard	Graduate Student

== Roster ==
2025–26 Iona Gaels women's basketball team
Players
Coaches

Pos.	#	Name	Height	Year	Previous school	Hometown
G	0	Arianna Davis	5 ft 5 in (1.65 m)	Fr	St. Francis Prep	Queens, New York
G	1	Chloe Vasquez (C)	5 ft 10 in (1.78 m)	So	Pequannock Township High School	Pompton Plains, New Jersey
G	2	Isabellah Middleton	5 ft 9 in (1.75 m)	GS	St. Bonaventure	Leesburg, Virginia
G	3	Nevaeh Stone	5 ft 5 in (1.65 m)	So	Monsignor Scanlan High School	Bronx, New York
G	4	Ale Civera	5 ft 10 in (1.78 m)	Sr	IES Ortega y Gasset	Madrid, Spain
G	5	Ella Fajardo (C)	5 ft 5 in (1.65 m)	GS	Fairleigh Dickinson	Bergenfield, New Jersey
F	7	Naomi Barnwell	6 ft 1 in (1.85 m)	GS	Robert Morris	Chanteloup-les-Vignes, France
G	10	Adrianna Gonzalez	5 ft 7 in (1.7 m)	So	Indian Trail High School	Kenosha, Wisconsin
G	11	Claudia Fiel	5 ft 7 in (1.7 m)	Jr	California Baptist	Pontevedra, Spain
F	12	Wilma Tuomi	6 ft 1 in (1.85 m)	Fr	Mäkelänrinteen lukio	Helsinki, Finland
G	13	Yannie Chan	5 ft 10 in (1.78 m)	GS	Emmanuel College	Hong Kong
G	14	Mya Zaccagnini (C)	5 ft 5 in (1.65 m)	Jr	Holy Cross	Waterbury, Connecticut
F	18	Johanna Flores	5 ft 10 in (1.78 m)	Fr	The Academy of Central Florida	Cananea, Mexico
G	21	Amaya B. Evans	5 ft 5 in (1.65 m)	Sr	Neptune High School	Neptune, New Jersey
F	30	Zoey Ward	6 ft 0 in (1.83 m)	Jr	Concord Academy	Gastonia, North Carolina
G		Olivia White	5 ft 9 in (1.75 m)	Fr	St. Luke's School	Bronx, New York

Head coach

- Angelika Szumilo (LIU Brooklyn)

Assistant coach(es)

- Aaron Gratch (Caldwell)
- Christian Mordi (William Paterson)
- Madison Stanley (Fairleigh Dickinson)

Legend

- (C) Team captain
- (S) Suspended
- (I) Ineligible
- (W) Walk-on
- Injured
- Current redshirt

Roster
Last update: June 19, 2026

== Schedule and results ==
Date time, TV	Rank^{#}	Opponent^{#}	Result	Record	Site (attendance) city, state
Non-conference regular season
November 3, 2025*; 11:00 am, ESPN+		Mercy	W 65–50	1–0	Hynes Athletics Center (1,036); New Rochelle, NY
November 9, 2025*; 1:00 pm, NECFR		at New Haven	W 57–45	2–0	Hazell Center (216); West Haven, CT
November 14, 2025*; 4:00 pm, FloCollege		at Charleston	L 44–75	2–1	TD Arena (240); Charleston, SC
November 16, 2025*; 1:00 pm, ESPN+		at Davidson	L 52–82	2–2	John M. Belk Arena (795); Davidson, NC
November 24, 2025*; 7:00 pm, NECFR		at Wagner	W 63−57	3−2	Spiro Sports Center (478); Staten Island, NY
November 28, 2025*; 12:00 pm, ESPN+		Saint Francis; Iona Turkey Tip-Off semifinals	W 50−31	4−2	Hynes Athletics Center (790); New Rochelle, NY
November 29, 2025*; 2:30 pm, ESPN+		UIC; Iona Turkey Tip-Off championship	W 52–50	5–2	Hynes Athletics Center (390); New Rochelle, NY
December 3, 2025*; 7:00 pm, ESPN+		UMass Lowell	W 67–56	6–2	Hynes Athletics Center (630); New Rochelle, NY
December 7, 2025*; 3:00 pm, ESPN+		at Navy	W 67–61	7–2	Alumni Hall (1,928); Annapolis, MD
December 13, 2025*; 7:00 pm, ESPN+		Dartmouth	L 57–65	7–3	Hynes Athletics Center (637); New Rochelle, NY
MAAC regular season
December 19, 2025; 6:00 pm, ESPN+		Sacred Heart	L 58–64 ^{OT}	7–4 (0–1)	Hynes Athletics Center (780); New Rochelle, NY
December 21, 2025; 3:00 pm, ESPN+		at Mount St. Mary's	L 55−65	7−5 (0–2)	Knott Arena (882); Emmitsburg, MD
December 29, 2025; 4:00 pm, ESPN+		Rider	W 72–53	8–5 (1–2)	Hynes Athletics Center (675); New Rochelle, NY
January 1, 2026; 2:00 pm, NESN/ESPN+		at Quinnipiac	L 54–80	8–6 (1–3)	M&T Bank Arena (487); Hamden, CT
January 3, 2026; 1:00 pm, ESPN+		Siena	L 80–94	8–7 (1–4)	Hynes Athletics Center (636); New Rochelle, NY
January 8, 2026; 11:00 am, ESPN+		at Niagara	W 77–49	9–7 (2–4)	Gallagher Center (1,123); Lewiston, NY
January 10, 2026; 1:00 pm, ESPN+		at Canisius	W 60–51	10–7 (3–4)	Koessler Athletic Center (421); Buffalo, NY
January 14, 2026; 11:00 am, ESPN+		Merrimack	W 58–51	11–7 (4–4)	Hynes Athletics Center (1,525); New Rochelle, NY
January 19, 2026; 1:00 pm, ESPN+		Saint Peter's	L 57–63	11–8 (4–5)	Hynes Athletics Center (579); New Rochelle, NY
January 22, 2026; 6:00 pm, ESPN+		at Rider	W 48–40	12–8 (5–5)	Alumni Gymnasium (426); Lawrenceville, NJ
January 24, 2026; 1:00 pm, SNY/ESPN+		Marist	W 65–64	13–8 (6–5)	Hynes Athletics Center (726); New Rochelle, NY
January 29, 2026; 11:00 am, NESN/ESPN+		at Merrimack	L 63–87	13–9 (6–6)	Lawler Arena (332); North Andover, MA
January 31, 2026; 2:00 pm, ESPN+		at Manhattan	W 65–51	14–9 (7–6)	Draddy Gymnasium (292); Riverdale, NY
February 5, 2026; 6:00 pm, ESPN+		Mount St. Mary's	L 62–63	14–10 (7–7)	Hynes Athletics Center (546); New Rochelle, NY
February 7, 2026; 1:00 pm, ESPN+		at Fairfield	L 46–82	14–11 (7–8)	Leo D. Mahoney Arena (1,324); Fairfield, CT
February 12, 2026; 6:00 pm, ESPN+		Canisius	W 52–45	15–11 (8–8)	Hynes Athletics Center (805); New Rochelle, NY
February 14, 2026; 1:00 pm, ESPN+		Niagara	W 72–55	16–11 (9–8)	Hynes Athletics Center (846); New Rochelle, NY
February 19, 2026; 6:00 pm, ESPN+		at Siena	W 61–52	17–11 (10–8)	UHY Center (484); Loudonville, NY
February 21, 2026; 2:00 pm, ESPN+		at Saint Peter's	W 66–55	18–11 (11–8)	Run Baby Run Arena (180); Jersey City, NJ
February 26, 2026; 6:00 pm, ESPN+		Manhattan	W 65–59	19–11 (12–8)	Hynes Athletics Center (656); New Rochelle, NY
MAAC tournament
March 7, 2026; 12:00 pm, ESPN+	(4)	vs. (5) Siena; Quarterfinals	W 59–50	20–11	Boardwalk Hall; Atlantic City, NJ
March 8, 2026; 12:00 pm, ESPN+	(4)	vs. (1) Quinnipiac; Semifinals	L 62–63 ^{OT}	20–12	Boardwalk Hall; Atlantic City, NJ
*Non-conference game. ^{#}Rankings from AP Poll. (#) Tournament seedings in parentheses. All times are in Eastern.
