= 2025–26 Fairfield Stags women's basketball team =

American college basketball season

2025–26 Fairfield Stags women's basketball
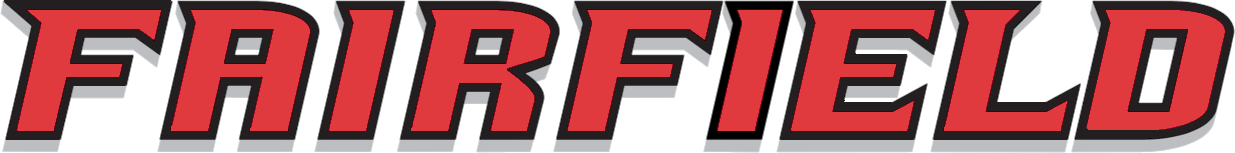

MAAC regular season co-champions and tournament champions

NCAA tournament, First Round
- Conference: Metro Atlantic Athletic Conference
- Record: 28–5 (19–1 MAAC)
- Head coach: Carly Thibault-DuDonis (4th season)
- Assistant coaches: Erik Johnson; Erika Brown; Blake DuDonis; Alex McKinnon
- Home arena: Leo D. Mahoney Arena

2025–26 MAAC women's basketball standings
	Conf.				Overall
Team	W		L	PCT	W		L	PCT
Quinnipiac	19	–	1	.950	27	–	7	.794
Fairfield †	19	–	1	.950	28	–	5	.848
Merrimack	15	–	5	.750	19	–	13	.594
Iona	12	–	8	.600	20	–	12	.625
Siena	11	–	9	.550	13	–	17	.433
Mount St. Mary's	11	–	9	.550	15	–	15	.500
Sacred Heart	10	–	10	.500	13	–	18	.419
Manhattan	10	–	10	.500	11	–	20	.355
Marist	8	–	12	.400	11	–	20	.355
Saint Peter's	6	–	14	.300	7	–	23	.233
Rider	5	–	15	.250	7	–	22	.241
Canisius	3	–	17	.150	5	–	24	.172
Niagara	1	–	19	.050	1	–	28	.034
† 2026 MAAC tournament winner

The 2025–26 Fairfield Stags women's basketball team represented Fairfield University during the 2025–26 NCAA Division I women's basketball season. The Stags, led by fourth-year head coach Carly Thibault-DuDonis, played their home games at Leo D. Mahoney Arena in Fairfield, Connecticut as members of the Metro Atlantic Athletic Conference.

== Previous season ==
The Stags finished the 2024–25 season 28–5, 19–1 in MAAC play, to finish as MAAC regular season champions. They would defeat Manhattan, Mount St. Mary's and Quinnipiac to win the MAAC tournament and earn the conference's automatic bid to the NCAA tournament. They received the #12 seed in the Spokane Regional 4, where they would fall to #4 region seed Kansas State in the first round.

== Preseason ==
On September 30, 2025, the MAAC released their preseason coaches poll. Fairfield was picked to finish atop the conference, receiving all thirteen first-place votes.

=== Preseason rankings ===
MAAC preseason poll
Predicted finish	Team	Votes (1st place)
1	Fairfield	169 (13)
2	Quinnipac	155
3	Mount St. Mary's	132
4	Marist	128
5	Siena	103
6	Iona	100
7	Manhattan	95
8	Merrimack	76
9	Canisius	69
10	Saint Peter's	51
11	Niagara	48
12	Sacared Heart	43
13	Rider	13

=== Preseason All-MAAC First Team ===
Preseason All-MAAC Team
Player	Year	Position
Meghan Andersen	Junior	Forward
Janelle Brown	Graduate Student	Guard
Catarina Ferreira	Junior	Guard

== Roster ==
2025–26 Fairfield Stags women's basketball team
Players
Coaches

Pos.	#	Name	Height	Year	Previous school	Hometown
G	0	Jillian Huerter	6 ft 0 in (1.83 m)	Jr	Rutgers	Clifton Park, New York
F	2	Selen Yusan	6 ft 1 in (1.85 m)	Fr	Okyanus College	Istanbul, Turkey
G	3	Janelle Brown	5 ft 6 in (1.68 m)	GS	Longwood High School	Middle Island, New York
G	4	Kaety L'Amoreaux	5 ft 6 in (1.68 m)	Jr	Maine-Endwell High School	Endwell, New York
F	5	Meghan Andersen	6 ft 1 in (1.85 m)	Jr	Our Lady of Mercy Academy	Wantagh, New York
G	7	Keyarah Gregory	5 ft 3 in (1.6 m)	RS Fr	Fort Erie International Academy	Pickering, Ontario
F	13	Cyanne Coe	6 ft 0 in (1.83 m)	So	Capital Courts Academy	Bolton, Ontario
F	15	Lauren Beach	6 ft 1 in (1.85 m)	GS	Medway High School	Medway, Massachusetts
G	22	Alli Campbell	6 ft 0 in (1.83 m)	GS	Penn State	Altoona, Pennsylvania
G	22	Casey Prior	5 ft 7 in (1.7 m)	Jr	Red Bank Catholic High School	Sea Girt, New Jersey
G	22	Alli Campbell	6 ft 0 in (1.83 m)	GS	Notre Dame	Altoona, PA
F	24	Jalyn Sackrider	6 ft 3 in (1.91 m)	GS	Evergreen State	Elma, Washington
G	25	Sydni Scott	5 ft 8 in (1.73 m)	Sr	Marshall	Prospect Park, Pennsylvania
G	30	Christina Pham	5 ft 7 in (1.7 m)	Fr	Noble and Greenough School	Boston, Massachusetts
G	31	Julia Karpell	5 ft 11 in (1.8 m)	So	St. John Vianney High School	Holmdel, New Jersey
F	32	Milou van Vliet	6 ft 0 in (1.83 m)	Fr	Orange Lions Academy	Barendrecht, Netherlands

Head coach

- Carly Thibault-DuDonis (Monmouth)

Assistant coach(es)

- Erik Johnson (UC San Diego)
- Erika Brown (Delaware)
- Blake DuDonis (Gardner–Webb)
- Alex McKinnon (Montclair State)

Legend

- (C) Team captain
- (S) Suspended
- (I) Ineligible
- (W) Walk-on
- Injured
- Current redshirt

Roster
Last update: March 11, 2026

== Schedule and results ==
Date time, TV	Rank^{#}	Opponent^{#}	Result	Record	Site (attendance) city, state
Non-conference regular season
November 5, 2025*; 7:00 p.m., ESPN+		at Villanova	W 75–63	1–0	Finneran Pavilion (1,211); Villanova, PA
November 8, 2025*; 7:00 p.m., ESPN+		Lehigh	W 88–60	2–0	Leo D. Mahoney Arena (1,533); Fairfield, CT
November 8, 2025*; 6:00 p.m., ESPNU		vs. South Florida; WBCA Challenge	W 80–72	3–0	Michelob Ultra Arena (1,588); Paradise, NV
November 15, 2025*; 6:00 p.m., ESPN+		vs. No. 11 North Carolina; WBCA Challenge	L 68–82	3–1	Michelob Ultra Arena (2,116); Paradise, NV
November 25, 2025*; 11:00 a.m., ESPN+		New Haven	W 79–60	4–1	Leo D. Mahoney Arena (3,021); Fairfield, CT
November 30, 2025*; 1:00 p.m., BTN		at No. 11 Iowa	L 72–86	4–2	Carver–Hawkeye Arena (14,998); Iowa City, IA
December 5, 2025*; 12:00 p.m., ESPN+		at Howard	L 69–72	4–3	Burr Gymnasium (1,076); Washington, D.C.
December 7, 2025*; 2:00 p.m., ESPN+		at Richmond	W 93–73	5–3	Robins Center (1,343); Richmond, VA
December 12, 2025*; 7:00 p.m., ESPN+		Maine	W 74–51	6–3	Leo D. Mahoney Arena (729); Fairfield, CT
MAAC regular season
December 19, 2025; 6:00 p.m., ESPN+		at Rider	W 84–58	7–3 (1–0)	Alumni Gymnasium (312); Lawrenceville, NJ
December 21, 2025; 2:00 p.m., ESPN+		Merrimack	W 84–65	8–3 (2–0)	Leo D. Mahoney Arena (730); Fairfield, CT
December 29, 2025; 7:00 p.m., ESPN+		at Manhattan	W 84–59	9–3 (3–0)	Draddy Gymnasium (212); Riverdale, NY
January 1, 2026; 2:00 p.m., ESPN+		Canisius	W 72–43	10–3 (4–0)	Leo D. Mahoney Arena (905); Fairfield, CT
January 3, 2026; 2:00 p.m., ESPN+		Niagara	W 98–42	11–3 (5–0)	Leo D. Mahoney Arena (834); Fairfield, CT
January 8, 2026; 6:00 p.m., ESPN+		at Saint Peter's	W 84–62	12–3 (6–0)	Yanitelli Center (240); Jersey City, NJ
January 14, 2026; 11:00 a.m., ESPN+		at Marist	W 63–49	13–3 (7–0)	McCann Arena (2,788); Poughkeepsie, NY
January 17, 2026; 2:00 p.m., ESPN+		Manhattan	W 76–54	14–3 (8–0)	Leo D. Mahoney Arena (1,165); Fairfield, CT
January 19, 2026; 2:00 p.m., SNY		Siena	W 86–50	15–3 (9–0)	Leo D. Mahoney Arena (1,152); Fairfield, CT
January 22, 2026; 6:00 p.m., ESPN+		at Niagara	W 81–51	16–3 (10–0)	Gallagher Center (210); Lewiston, NY
January 24, 2026; 1:00 p.m., ESPN+		at Canisius	W 58–42	17–3 (11–0)	Koessler Athletic Center (621); Buffalo, NY
January 29, 2026; 7:00 p.m., ESPNU		Quinnipiac	L 58–72	17–4 (11–1)	Leo D. Mahoney Arena (1,491); Fairfield, CT
January 31, 2026; 2:00 p.m., ESPN+		at Sacred Heart	W 60–43	18–4 (12–1)	William H. Pitt Center (476); Fairfield, CT
February 5, 2026; 7:00 p.m., ESPN+		Marist	W 109–48	19–4 (13–1)	Leo D. Mahoney Arena (1,015); Fairfield, CT
February 7, 2026; 1:00 p.m., ESPN+		Iona	W 82–46	20–4 (14–1)	Leo D. Mahoney Arena (1,324); Fairfield, CT
February 12, 2026; 7:00 p.m., ESPN+		at Mount St. Mary's	W 69–43	21–4 (15–1)	Knott Arena (956); Emmitsburg, MD
February 14, 2026; 4:00 p.m., ESPN+		at Quinnipiac	W 75–63	22–4 (16–1)	M&T Bank Arena (1,307); Hamden, CT
February 19, 2026; 7:00 p.m., ESPN+		Saint Peter's	W 62–30	23–4 (17–1)	Leo D. Mahoney Arena (741); Fairfield, CT
February 21, 2026; 2:00 p.m., ESPN+		at Siena	W 81–51	24–4 (18–1)	UHY Center (705); Loudonville, NY
February 28, 2026; 7:00 p.m., ESPN+		Sacred Heart	W 67–50	25–4 (19–1)	Leo D. Mahoney Arena (2,036); Fairfield, CT
MAAC tournament
March 6, 2026; 2:30 p.m., ESPN+	(2) No. 25	vs. (7) Sacred Heart; Quarterfinals	W 69–53	26–4	Jim Whelan Boardwalk Hall (1,785); Atlantic City, NJ
March 8, 2026; 2:30 p.m., ESPN+	(2) No. 25	vs. (3) Merrimack; Semifinals	W 65–48	27–4	Jim Whelan Boardwalk Hall (1,059); Atlantic City, NJ
March 9, 2026; 6:00 p.m., ESPN+	(2)	vs. (1) Quinnipiac; Championship	W 51–44	28–4	Jim Whelan Boardwalk Hall (826); Atlantic City, NJ
NCAA tournament
March 21, 2026*; 2:30 p.m., ESPN	(11 FW1)	vs. (6 FW1) No. 22 Notre Dame; First Round	L 60–79	28–5	Value City Arena; Columbus, OH
*Non-conference game. ^{#}Rankings from AP Poll. (#) Tournament seedings in parentheses. Fort Worth 1=FW1. All times are in Eastern.

== Rankings ==
Ranking movements Legend: ██ Increase in ranking ██ Decrease in ranking — = Not ranked RV = Received votes
	Week																				
Poll	Pre	1	2	3	4	5	6	7	8	9	10	11	12	13	14	15	16	17	18	19	Final
AP	—	—	RV	RV	RV	RV	—	—	—*	—	—	RV	RV	RV	RV	RV	RV	25	RV	RV	Not released
Coaches	RV	RV	RV	—	—	—	—	—	—	—	—	—	—	—	—	—	—	RV	RV	RV	

*AP did not release a week 8 poll.
