= 2025–26 Rider Broncs women's basketball team =

American college basketball season

2025–26 Rider Broncs women's basketball
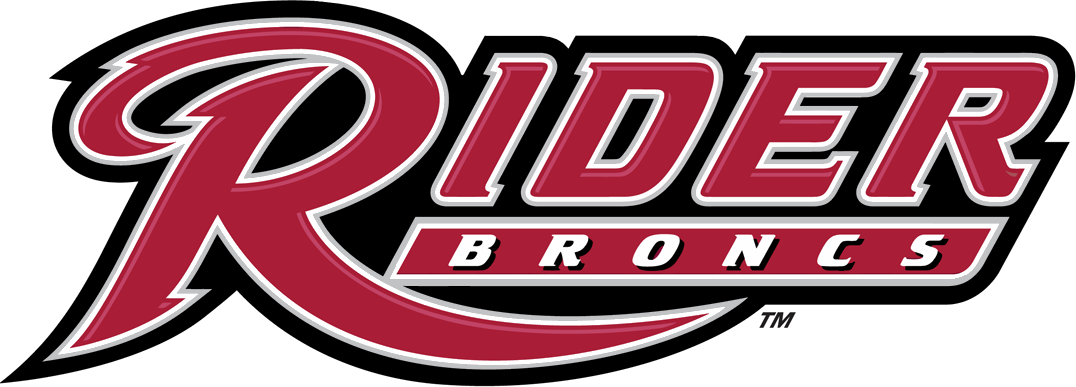
- Conference: Metro Atlantic Athletic Conference
- Record: 7–22 (5–15 MAAC)
- Head coach: Jackie Hartzell (1st season)
- Assistant coaches: Denise King; Kaitlyn Lewis; Jim Ricci
- Home arena: Alumni Gymnasium

2025–26 MAAC women's basketball standings
	Conf.				Overall
Team	W		L	PCT	W		L	PCT
Quinnipiac	19	–	1	.950	27	–	7	.794
Fairfield †	19	–	1	.950	28	–	5	.848
Merrimack	15	–	5	.750	19	–	13	.594
Iona	12	–	8	.600	20	–	12	.625
Siena	11	–	9	.550	13	–	17	.433
Mount St. Mary's	11	–	9	.550	15	–	15	.500
Sacred Heart	10	–	10	.500	13	–	18	.419
Manhattan	10	–	10	.500	11	–	20	.355
Marist	8	–	12	.400	11	–	20	.355
Saint Peter's	6	–	14	.300	7	–	23	.233
Rider	5	–	15	.250	7	–	22	.241
Canisius	3	–	17	.150	5	–	24	.172
Niagara	1	–	19	.050	1	–	28	.034
† 2026 MAAC tournament winner

The 2025–26 Rider Broncs women's basketball team represented Rider University during the 2025–26 NCAA Division I women's basketball season. The Broncs, led by first-year head coach Jackie Hartzell, played their home games at the Alumni Gymnasium in Lawrenceville, New Jersey as members of the Metro Atlantic Athletic Conference.

== Previous season ==
The Broncs finished the 2024–25 season 7–22, 5–15 in MAAC play, to finish in a tie for 11th place. They failed to qualify for the MAAC tournament, as this was the first year in which only the top 10 teams qualify.

On March 10, 2025, it was announced that longtime head coach Lynn Milligan would not be retained as head coach, ending her 18-year tenure with the team. On April 3, the school announced the hiring of Arcadia head coach Jackie Hartzell as the team's new head coach.

== Preseason ==
On September 30, 2025, the Metro Atlantic Athletic Conference released their preseason poll. Rider was picked to finish last in the conference.

=== Preseason rankings ===
MAAC Preseason Poll
Place	Team	Votes
1	Fairfield	169 (13)
2	Quinnipiac	155
3	Mount St. Mary's	132
4	Marist	128
5	Siena	103
6	Iona	100
7	Manhattan	95
8	Merrimack	76
9	Canisius	69
10	Saint Peter's	51
11	Niagara	48
12	Sacred Heart	43
13	Rider	14
(#) first-place votes

=== Preseason All-MAAC Teams ===
No players were named to the Preseason All-MAAC First, Second or Third Teams.

== Roster ==
2025–26 Rider Broncs women's basketball team
Players
Coaches

Pos.	#	Name	Height	Year	Previous school	Hometown
G	0	Daniya Brown	5 ft 7 in (1.7 m)	Fr	Bishop O'Connell High School	Fairfax, Virginia
G	1	Aliya McIver	5 ft 9 in (1.75 m)	Jr	White Plains High School	White Plains, New York
G	3	Deb Okechukwu	5 ft 9 in (1.75 m)	RS Jr	Harcum College	Washington, D.C.
G	10	Amany Lopez	5 ft 8 in (1.73 m)	So	South Shore Christian Prep	Springfield, Massachusetts
G	11	Emmy Roach	6 ft 0 in (1.83 m)	So	Eastern Mavericks	Littlehampton, Australia
G	13	Alena Cofield	5 ft 3 in (1.6 m)	Fr	Neshaminy High School	Langhorne, Pennsylvania
F	14	Sam Richardson	6 ft 3 in (1.91 m)	Jr	St. Benedict's Prep	Linden, New Jersey
G	15	Aina Perez Mesquida	5 ft 9 in (1.75 m)	Fr	IES CTEIB	Manacor, Spain
C	21	Claudia Lazaro-Carrasco	6 ft 2 in (1.88 m)	Fr	Ortega y Gasset	Madrid, Spain
F	22	Kristina Ekofo	6 ft 1 in (1.85 m)	GS	North Dakota State	Brussels, Belgium
G	23	Jocelyn Chavez	5 ft 9 in (1.75 m)	So	Valley Vista High School	Surprise, Arizona
C	44	Kaylan Deveney	6 ft 3 in (1.91 m)	Jr	Life Center Academy	Medford, New Jersey

Head coach

- Jackie Hartzell (La Salle)

Assistant coach(es)

- Denise King (Rhode Island)
- Kaitlyn Lewis (American)
- Jim Ricci (La Salle)

Legend

- (C) Team captain
- (S) Suspended
- (I) Ineligible
- (W) Walk-on
- Injured
- Current redshirt

Roster
Last update: June 26, 2026

== Schedule and results ==
Date time, TV	Rank^{#}	Opponent^{#}	Result	Record	Site (attendance) city, state
Non-conference regular season
November 6, 2025*; 6:00 pm, ESPN+		Lafayette	W 65–58	1–0	Alumni Gymnasium (728); Lawrenceville, NJ
November 12, 2025*; 6:00 pm, ACCNX		at Boston College	L 52–92	1–1	Conte Forum (591); Chestnut Hill, MA
November 13, 2025*; 6:00 pm, NECFR		at Stonehill	L 55–77	1–2	Merkert Gymnasium (204); Easton, MA
November 15, 2025*; 5:00 pm, ESPN+		at Bryant	L 57–81	1–3	Chace Athletic Center (205); Smithfield, RI
November 19, 2025*; 7:00 pm, ESPN+		at Navy	L 56–67	1–4	Alumni Hall (469); Annapolis, MD
November 25, 2025*; 7:00 pm, ESPN+		at George Mason	L 54−72	1−5	EagleBank Arena (841); Fairfax, VA
December 2, 2025*; 5:00 pm, NECFR		at LIU	W 58−43	2−5	Steinberg Wellness Center (128); Brooklyn, NY
December 6, 2025*; 2:00 pm, ESPN+		Yale	L 52–53	2–6	Alumni Gymnasium (482); Lawrenceville, NJ
December 13, 2025*; 2:00 pm, ESPN+		Wagner	L 34–46	2–7	Alumni Gymnasium (412); Lawrenceville, NJ
MAAC regular season
December 19, 2025; 6:00 pm, ESPN+		Fairfield	L 58–84	2–8 (0–1)	Alumni Gymnasium (312); Lawrenceville, NJ
December 21, 2025; 2:00 pm, ESPN+		at Sacred Heart	L 59–61	2–9 (0–2)	William H. Pitt Center (447); Fairfield, CT
December 29, 2025; 4:00 pm, ESPN+		at Iona	L 53–72	2–10 (0–3)	Hynes Athletics Center (675); New Rochelle, NY
January 1, 2026; 2:00 pm, ESPN+		Merrimack	L 54−72	2−11 (0–4)	Alumni Gymnasium (347); Lawrenceville, NJ
January 3, 2026; 2:00 pm, ESPN+		Quinnipiac	L 56–68	2–12 (0–5)	Alumni Gymnasium (386); Lawrenceville, NJ
January 8, 2026; 11:00 am, ESPN+		at Siena	W 61–59	3–12 (1–5)	UHY Center (1,625); Loudonville, NY
January 10, 2026; 2:00 pm, ESPN+		at Marist	L 49–62	3–13 (1–6)	McCann Arena (633); Poughkeepsie, NY
January 17, 2026; 2:00 pm, ESPN+		Sacred Heart	W 64–54	4–13 (2–6)	Alumni Gymnasium (389); Lawrenceville, NJ
January 19, 2026; 7:00 pm, ESPN+/SNY		at Manhattan	L 46–58	4–14 (2–7)	Draddy Gymnasium (182); Riverdale, NY
January 22, 2026; 6:00 pm, ESPN+		Iona	L 40–48	4–15 (2–8)	Alumni Gymnasium (426); Lawrenceville, NJ
January 24, 2026; 2:00 pm, ESPN+		at Saint Peter's	L 46–55	4–16 (2–9)	Run Baby Run Arena (233); Jersey City, NJ
January 29, 2026; 6:00 pm, ESPN+		Mount St. Mary's	L 59–70	4–17 (2–10)	Alumni Gymnasium (314); Lawrenceville, NJ
February 5, 2026; 6:00 pm, ESPN+		Manhattan	W 71–60	5–17 (3–10)	Alumni Gymnasium (326); Lawrenceville, NJ
February 7, 2026; 12:00 pm, ESPN+/NESN		at Merrimack	L 37–73	5–18 (3–11)	Lawler Arena (372); North Andover, MA
February 12, 2026; 6:00 pm, ESPN+		Saint Peter's	L 40–42	5–19 (3–12)	Alumni Gymnasium (292); Lawrenceville, NJ
February 14, 2026; 1:00 pm, ESPN+		Marist	W 56–43	6–19 (4–12)	Alumni Gymnasium (512); Lawrenceville, NJ
February 19, 2026; 6:30 pm, ESPN+		at Canisius	W 55–53 ^{OT}	7–19 (5–12)	Koessler Athletic Center (473); Buffalo, NY
February 21, 2026; 2:00 pm, ESPN+		at Niagara	L 52–56	7–20 (5–13)	Gallagher Center (428); Lewiston, NY
February 26, 2026; 6:00 pm, ESPN+		Siena	L 55–67	7–21 (5–14)	Alumni Gymnasium (486); Lawrenceville, NJ
February 28, 2026; 1:00 pm, ESPN+		at Mount St. Mary's	L 46–54	7–22 (5–15)	Knott Arena (548); Emmitsburg, MD
*Non-conference game. ^{#}Rankings from AP Poll. (#) Tournament seedings in parentheses. All times are in Eastern.
