= 2025–26 Sacred Heart Pioneers women's basketball team =

American college basketball season

2025–26 Sacred Heart Pioneers women's basketball
- Conference: Metro Atlantic Athletic Conference
- Record: 13–18 (10–10 MAAC)
- Head coach: Jessica Mannetti (13th season)
- Associate head coach: Marc Taney
- Assistant coaches: Jacinda Dunbar; Jen Peel
- Home arena: William H. Pitt Center

2025–26 MAAC women's basketball standings
| | Conf. | | | | Overall |
| Team | W | | L | PCT | W | | L | PCT |
|---|---|---|---|---|---|---|---|---|
| Quinnipiac | 19 | – | 1 | .950 | 27 | – | 7 | .794 |
| Fairfield † | 19 | – | 1 | .950 | 28 | – | 5 | .848 |
| Merrimack | 15 | – | 5 | .750 | 19 | – | 13 | .594 |
| Iona | 12 | – | 8 | .600 | 20 | – | 12 | .625 |
| Siena | 11 | – | 9 | .550 | 13 | – | 17 | .433 |
| Mount St. Mary's | 11 | – | 9 | .550 | 15 | – | 15 | .500 |
| Sacred Heart | 10 | – | 10 | .500 | 13 | – | 18 | .419 |
| Manhattan | 10 | – | 10 | .500 | 11 | – | 20 | .355 |
| Marist | 8 | – | 12 | .400 | 11 | – | 20 | .355 |
| Saint Peter's | 6 | – | 14 | .300 | 7 | – | 23 | .233 |
| Rider | 5 | – | 15 | .250 | 7 | – | 22 | .241 |
| Canisius | 3 | – | 17 | .150 | 5 | – | 24 | .172 |
| Niagara | 1 | – | 19 | .050 | 1 | – | 28 | .034 |
† 2026 MAAC tournament winner

The 2025–26 Sacred Heart Pioneers women's basketball team represented Sacred Heart University during the 2025–26 NCAA Division I women's basketball season. The Pioneers, led by 13th-year head coach Jessica Mannetti, played their home games at the William H. Pitt Center in Fairfield, Connecticut as members of the Metro Atlantic Athletic Conference.

== Previous season ==
The Pioneers finished the 2024–25 season 9–20, 5–15 in MAAC play, to finish in a tie for 11th place. They failed to qualify for the MAAC tournament, as this was the first year in which only the top 10 teams qualified.

== Preseason ==
On September 30, 2025, the Metro Atlantic Athletic Conference released their preseason poll. Sacred Heart was picked to finish 12th in the conference.

=== Preseason rankings ===
MAAC Preseason Poll
| Place | Team | Votes |
|---|---|---|
| 1 | Fairfield | 169 (13) |
| 2 | Quinnipiac | 155 |
| 3 | Mount St. Mary's | 132 |
| 4 | Marist | 128 |
| 5 | Siena | 103 |
| 6 | Iona | 100 |
| 7 | Manhattan | 95 |
| 8 | Merrimack | 76 |
| 9 | Canisius | 69 |
| 10 | Saint Peter's | 51 |
| 11 | Niagara | 48 |
| 12 | Sacred Heart | 43 |
| 13 | Rider | 14 |
(#) first-place votes

=== Preseason All-MAAC Teams ===
Preseason All-MAAC Teams
| Team | Player | Position | Year |
|---|---|---|---|
| Third | Amelia Wood | Guard | Senior |

== Roster ==
2025–26 Sacred Heart Pioneers women's basketball team
Players
Coaches

| Pos. | # | Name | Height | Year | Previous school | Hometown |
|---|---|---|---|---|---|---|
| G | 0 | Montana Nicks | 5 ft 6 in (1.68 m) | Jr | Dwight-Englewood School | Englewood, New Jersey |
| G | 2 | Sophie Nascimento | 5 ft 8 in (1.73 m) | Fr | The Ursuline School | Scarsdale, New York |
| G | 3 | Taaliyah Porter | 5 ft 9 in (1.75 m) | Fr | Stevens High School | Rapid City, South Dakota |
| F | 4 | Nalyce Dudley | 5 ft 11 in (1.8 m) | Jr | New London High School | Norwich, Connecticut |
| G | 5 | Grace John | 5 ft 5 in (1.65 m) | Sr | Barton Community College | Bayelsa, Nigeria |
| G | 9 | Missy Nuku | 5 ft 6 in (1.68 m) | Jr | Lakeland College | Tauranga, New Zealand |
| C | 10 | Emma Kirby | 6 ft 2 in (1.88 m) | Jr | Tatnall School | Chadds Ford, Pennsylvania |
| C | 14 | Esther Kursite | 6 ft 2 in (1.88 m) | So | City of London Academy | London, England |
| G | 20 | Kristen Phelan | 5 ft 8 in (1.73 m) | Fr | Tappan Zee High School | Tappan, New York |
| G | 23 | Faith Pappas | 5 ft 11 in (1.8 m) | Sr | Fordham | Long Valley, New Jersey |
| G | 24 | Sierra Johnson | 5 ft 8 in (1.73 m) | Sr | TPLS Christian Academy | Richmond, Virginia |
| G | 30 | Jordanna Schrecker | 5 ft 8 in (1.73 m) | Fr | New Dorp High School | Staten Island, New York |
| G | 33 | Amelia Wood | 6 ft 0 in (1.83 m) | Sr | Averill Park High School | Wynantskill, New York |
| G | 44 | Dianne Crespo López | 5 ft 10 in (1.78 m) | So | Colegio Adianez | Río Grande, Puerto Rico |

Head coach

- Jessica Mannetti (Concordia (NY))

Assistant coach(es)

- Marc Taney (Springfield)
- Jacinda Dunbar (Quinnipiac)
- Jen Peel (Saint Anselm)

Legend

- (C) Team captain
- (S) Suspended
- (I) Ineligible
- (W) Walk-on
- Injured
- Current redshirt

Roster
Last update: June 22, 2026

== Schedule and results ==
| Date time, TV | Rank^{#} | Opponent^{#} | Result | Record | Site (attendance) city, state |
Non-conference regular season
| November 3, 2025*; 7:00 pm, ESPN+ | | NJIT | L 51–64 | 0–1 | William H. Pitt Center (721); Fairfield, CT |
| November 9, 2025*; 2:00 pm, ESPN+ | | at No. 14 Iowa State | L 34–99 | 0–2 | Hilton Coliseum (8,977); Ames, IA |
| November 13, 2025*; 7:00 pm, NECFR | | at Central Connecticut | W 74–64 | 1–2 | William H. Detrick Gymnasium (607); New Britain, CT |
| November 18, 2025*; 7:00 pm, ESPN+ | | at Georgetown | L 44–77 | 1–3 | McDonough Arena; Washington, D.C. |
| November 22, 2025*; 1:00 pm, FloCollege | | at Northeastern | L 60–68 | 1–4 | Cabot Center (321); Boston, MA |
| November 25, 2025*; 7:00 pm, ESPN+ | | Mercy | W 58−46 | 2−4 | William H. Pitt Center (690); Fairfield, CT |
| December 3, 2025*; 11:00 am, ESPN+ | | Albany | L 57−60 | 2−5 | William H. Pitt Center (723); Fairfield, CT |
| December 6, 2025*; 2:00 pm, ESPN+ | | at Coppin State | L 49–52 | 2–6 | Physical Education Complex (267); Baltimore, MD |
| December 14, 2025*; 2:00 pm, ESPN+ | | Vermont | L 46–63 | 2–7 | William H. Pitt Center (565); Fairfield, CT |
MAAC regular season
| December 19, 2025; 6:00 pm, ESPN+ | | at Iona | W 64–58 ^{OT} | 3–7 (1–0) | Hynes Athletics Center (780); New Rochelle, NY |
| December 21, 2025; 2:00 pm, ESPN+ | | Rider | W 61–59 | 4–7 (2–0) | William H. Pitt Center (447); Fairfield, CT |
| December 29, 2025; 2:00 pm, ESPN+ | | at Marist | L 55–57 | 4–8 (2–1) | McCann Arena (757); Poughkeepsie, NY |
| January 1, 2026; 2:00 pm, ESPN+ | | Niagara | W 84−53 | 5−8 (3–1) | William H. Pitt Center (511); Fairfield, CT |
| January 3, 2026; 2:00 pm, ESPN+ | | Canisius | W 77–61 | 6–8 (4–1) | William H. Pitt Center (632); Fairfield, CT |
| January 10, 2026; 3:00 pm, ESPN+ | | at Quinnipiac | L 49–65 | 6–9 (4–2) | M&T Bank Arena (676); Hamden, CT |
| January 14, 2026; 11:30 am, ESPN+ | | Siena | W 70–58 | 7–9 (5–2) | William H. Pitt Center (253); Fairfield, CT |
| January 17, 2026; 2:00 pm, ESPN+ | | at Rider | L 54–64 | 7–10 (5–3) | Alumni Gymnasium (389); Lawrenceville, NJ |
| January 19, 2026; 2:00 pm, ESPN+ | | Marist | W 56–54 | 8–10 (6–3) | William H. Pitt Center (564); Fairfield, CT |
| January 22, 2026; 6:30 pm, ESPN+ | | at Canisius | W 76–55 | 9–10 (7–3) | Koessler Athletic Center (425); Buffalo, NY |
| January 24, 2026; 2:00 pm, ESPN+ | | at Niagara | W 70–65 | 10–10 (8–3) | Gallagher Center (234); Lewiston, NY |
| January 29, 2026; 7:00 pm, ESPN+ | | Manhattan | W 52–50 | 11–10 (9–3) | William H. Pitt Center (553); Fairfield, CT |
| January 31, 2026; 2:00 pm, ESPN+ | | Fairfield | L 43–60 | 11–11 (9–4) | William H. Pitt Center (1,006); Fairfield, CT |
| February 5, 2026; 7:00 pm, ESPN+ | | at Merrimack | L 47–69 | 11–12 (9–5) | Lawler Arena (325); North Andover, MA |
| February 7, 2026; 1:00 pm, ESPN+ | | Mount St. Mary's | L 63–68 ^{OT} | 11–13 (9–6) | William H. Pitt Center (815); Fairfield, CT |
| February 14, 2026; 2:00 pm, ESPN+ | | at Saint Peter's | W 63–61 | 12–13 (10–6) | Run Baby Run Arena (123); Jersey City, NJ |
| February 19, 2026; 7:00 pm, ESPN+ | | Merrimack | L 57–62 | 12–14 (10–7) | William H. Pitt Center (634); Fairfield, CT |
| February 21, 2026; 2:00 pm, ESPN+ | | Quinnipiac | L 39–55 | 12–15 (10–8) | William H. Pitt Center (805); Fairfield, CT |
| February 26, 2026; 7:00 pm, ESPN+ | | at Mount St. Mary's | L 61–66 | 12–16 (10–9) | Knott Arena (744); Emmitsburg, MD |
| February 28, 2026; 7:00 pm, ESPN+ | | at Fairfield | L 50–67 | 12–17 (10–10) | Leo D. Mahoney Arena (2,036); Fairfield, CT |
MAAC tournament
| March 5, 2026; 2:30 pm, ESPN+ | (7) | vs. (10) Saint Peter's; First Round | W 47–34 | 13–17 | Boardwalk Hall; Atlantic City, NJ |
| March 6, 2026; 2:30 pm, ESPN+ | (7) | vs. (2) Fairfield; Quarterfinals | L 53–69 | 13–18 | Boardwalk Hall (1,785); Atlantic City, NJ |
*Non-conference game. ^{#}Rankings from AP Poll. (#) Tournament seedings in parentheses. All times are in Eastern.
