= 2025–26 Siena Saints women's basketball team =

American college basketball season

2025–26 Siena Saints women's basketball
- Conference: Metro Atlantic Athletic Conference
- Record: 13–17 (11–9 MAAC)
- Head coach: Terry Primm (2nd season)
- Assistant coaches: Sydnie Rosales; Billy Lovett
- Home arena: UHY Center

2025–26 MAAC women's basketball standings
	Conf.				Overall
Team	W		L	PCT	W		L	PCT
Quinnipiac	19	–	1	.950	27	–	7	.794
Fairfield †	19	–	1	.950	28	–	5	.848
Merrimack	15	–	5	.750	19	–	13	.594
Iona	12	–	8	.600	20	–	12	.625
Siena	11	–	9	.550	13	–	17	.433
Mount St. Mary's	11	–	9	.550	15	–	15	.500
Sacred Heart	10	–	10	.500	13	–	18	.419
Manhattan	10	–	10	.500	11	–	20	.355
Marist	8	–	12	.400	11	–	20	.355
Saint Peter's	6	–	14	.300	7	–	23	.233
Rider	5	–	15	.250	7	–	22	.241
Canisius	3	–	17	.150	5	–	24	.172
Niagara	1	–	19	.050	1	–	28	.034
† 2026 MAAC tournament winner

The 2025–26 Siena Saints women's basketball team represented Siena University during the 2025–26 NCAA Division I women's basketball season. The Saints, led by second-year head coach Terry Primm, played their home games at the UHY Center in Loudonville, New York, as members of the Metro Atlantic Athletic Conference.

== Previous season ==
The Saints finished the 2024–25 season 17–14, 14–6 in MAAC play, to finish in third place. They were upset by #6 seed Merrimack in the quarterfinals of the MAAC tournament. They received an at-large bid to the WNIT, where they would be defeated by Howard in the first round.

== Preseason ==
On September 30, 2025, the Metro Atlantic Athletic Conference released their preseason poll. Siena was picked to finish fifth in the conference.

=== Preseason rankings ===
MAAC Preseason Poll
Place	Team	Votes
1	Fairfield	169 (13)
2	Quinnipiac	155
3	Mount St. Mary's	132
4	Marist	128
5	Siena	103
6	Iona	100
7	Manhattan	95
8	Merrimack	76
9	Canisius	69
10	Saint Peter's	51
11	Niagara	48
12	Sacred Heart	43
13	Rider	14
(#) first-place votes

=== Preseason All-MAAC Teams ===
No players were named to the Preseason All-MAAC First, Second or Third Teams.

== Roster ==
2025–26 Siena Saints women's basketball team
Players
Coaches

Pos.	#	Name	Height	Year	Previous school	Hometown
G	0	Jamariah Turner	5 ft 9 in (1.75 m)	GS	Stillman College	Huntsville, Alabama
G	3	Francesca Schiro	5 ft 7 in (1.7 m)	Fr	Hillsborough High School	Hillsborough, New Jersey
G	4	Valencia Fontenelle-Posson	5 ft 10 in (1.78 m)	GS	Guilderland High School	Guilderland, New York
G	5	Azera Gates	5 ft 5 in (1.65 m)	Fr	Albany High School	Albany, New York
G	6	Zyriah Price	6 ft 0 in (1.83 m)	So	Hazel Green High School	Huntsville, Alabama
G	7	Dallas Pierce	5 ft 10 in (1.78 m)	Jr	UMass	New Castle, Delaware
G	9	Caydence Hadley	6 ft 1 in (1.85 m)	Jr	Towson	Rochester, New York
G	10	Nicole Melious	5 ft 8 in (1.73 m)	RS So	Seton Hall	Staten Island, New York
G	11	Alexis Rosenfeld	6 ft 3 in (1.91 m)	RS Fr	Manhattan	Ridgewood, New Jersey
G	12	Alden Yergey	5 ft 9 in (1.75 m)	RS So	Brentsville District High School	Nokesville, Virginia
G	20	Kaiya Rain Tucker	6 ft 1 in (1.85 m)	Fr	Friends' Central School	Philadelphia, Pennsylvania
G	22	Genevive Wedemeyer	5 ft 8 in (1.73 m)	Jr	UAB	Hamburg, Germany
G	24	Olivia Watkins	6 ft 1 in (1.85 m)	Fr	Norman North High School	Lawton, Oklahoma
G	32	Garrisen Freeman	5 ft 10 in (1.78 m)	GS	Cal State Bakersfield	Las Vegas, Nevada

Head coach

- Terry Primm (Palm Beach Atlantic)

Assistant coach(es)

- Sydnie Rosales (Marist)
- Billy Lovett (Fordham)

Legend

- (C) Team captain
- (S) Suspended
- (I) Ineligible
- (W) Walk-on
- Injured
- Current redshirt

Roster
Last update: June 20, 2026

== Schedule and results ==
Date time, TV	Rank^{#}	Opponent^{#}	Result	Record	Site (attendance) city, state
Exhibition
October 29, 2025*; 6:00 pm		RPI	W 97–47	–	UHY Center (341); Loudonville, NY
Non-conference regular season
November 4, 2025*; 6:00 pm, ESPN+		Colgate	L 43–53	0–1	UHY Center (432); Loudonville, NY
November 8, 2025*; 2:00 pm, ESPN+		at UMass	L 73–84	0–2	Mullins Center (970); Amherst, MA
November 13, 2025*; 6:00 pm, ESPN+		at Army	L 52–67	0–3	Christl Arena (549); West Point, NY
November 16, 2025*; 2:00 pm, ESPN+		Dartmouth	L 55–65	0–4	UHY Center (416); Loudonville, NY
November 19, 2025*; 6:30 pm, ESPN+		at Albany; Albany Cup	L 42−67	0−5	Broadview Center (1,631); Albany, NY
November 24, 2025*; 7:00 pm, B1G+		at Rutgers	L 61−67	0−6	Jersey Mike's Arena (1,757); Piscataway, NJ
November 26, 2025*; 2:30 pm, ESPN+		at Cornell	L 47–49	0–7	Newman Arena (314); Ithaca, NY
December 3, 2025*; 6:00 pm, ESPN+		New Haven	W 80–54	1–7	UHY Center (281); Loudonville, NY
December 15, 2025*; 6:00 pm, ESPN+		Central Connecticut	W 94–56	2–7	UHY Center (324); Loudonville, NY
MAAC regular season
December 19, 2025; 6:00 pm, ESPN+		at Niagara	W 107–69	3–7 (1–0)	Gallagher Center (239); Lewiston, NY
December 21, 2025; 1:00 pm, ESPN+		at Canisius	W 73–56	4–7 (2–0)	Koessler Athletic Center (110); Buffalo, NY
January 1, 2026; 2:00 pm, ESPN+		Mount St. Mary's	W 69−59	5−7 (3–0)	UHY Center (405); Loudonville, NY
January 3, 2026; 1:00 pm, ESPN+		at Iona	W 94–80	6–7 (4–0)	Hynes Athletics Center (636); New Rochelle, NY
January 8, 2026; 11:00 am, ESPN+		Rider	L 59–61	6–8 (4–1)	UHY Center (1,625); Loudonville, NY
January 10, 2026; 2:00 pm, ESPN+		Merrimack	L 65–82	6–9 (4–2)	UHY Center (367); Loudonville, NY
January 14, 2026; 11:30 am, ESPN+		at Sacred Heart	L 58–70	6–10 (4–3)	William H. Pitt Center (253); Fairfield, CT
January 17, 2026; 2:00 pm, ESPN+		Saint Peter's	W 74–47	7–10 (5–3)	UHY Center (423); Loudonville, NY
January 19, 2026; 2:00 pm, SNY/ESPN+		at Fairfield	L 50–86	7–11 (5–4)	Leo D. Mahoney Arena (1,152); Fairfield, CT
January 22, 2026; 6:00 pm, ESPN+		at Marist	L 72–75	7–12 (5–5)	McCann Arena (508); Poughkeepsie, NY
January 29, 2026; 6:00 pm, ESPN+		Niagara	W 84–64	8–12 (6–5)	UHY Center (549); Loudonville, NY
January 31, 2026; 2:00 pm, ESPN+		Canisius	W 69–65 ^{OT}	9–12 (7–5)	UHY Center (685); Loudonville, NY
February 5, 2026; 7:00 pm, ESPN+		at Saint Peter's	W 75–62	10–12 (8–5)	Run Baby Run Arena (359); Jersey City, NJ
February 7, 2026; 2:00 pm, ESPN+		Manhattan	Postponed due to inclement weather		UHY Center; Loudonville, NY
February 8, 2026; 12:00 pm, ESPN+		at Manhattan; Rescheduled from February 7	W 91–72	11–12 (9–5)	Draddy Gymnasium (142); Riverdale, NY
February 12, 2026; 6:00 pm, ESPN+		at Quinnipiac	L 40–62	11–13 (9–6)	M&T Bank Arena (310); Hamden, CT
February 14, 2026; 2:00 pm, ESPN+		at Merrimack	L 60–79	11–14 (9–7)	Lawler Arena (321); North Andover, MA
February 19, 2026; 6:00 pm, ESPN+		Iona	L 52–61	11–15 (9–8)	UHY Center (484); Loudonville, NY
February 21, 2026; 2:00 pm, ESPN+		Fairfield	L 51–81	11–16 (9–9)	UHY Center (705); Loudonville, NY
February 26, 2026; 6:00 pm, ESPN+		at Rider	W 67–55	12–16 (10–9)	Alumni Gymnasium (486); Lawrenceville, NJ
February 28, 2026; 2:00 pm, ESPN+		Marist	W 67–57	13–16 (11–9)	UHY Center (632); Loudonville, NY
MAAC tournament
March 7, 2026; 12:00 pm, ESPN+	(5)	vs. (4) Iona; Quarterfinals	L 50–59	13–17	Boardwalk Hall; Atlantic City, NJ
*Non-conference game. ^{#}Rankings from AP Poll. (#) Tournament seedings in parentheses. All times are in Eastern.
