= 2025–26 Niagara Purple Eagles women's basketball team =

American college basketball season

2025–26 Niagara Purple Eagles women's basketball
- Conference: Metro Atlantic Athletic Conference
- Record: 1–28 (1–19 MAAC)
- Head coach: Jada Pierce (11th season)
- Associate head coach: Brianna Chambers; Lester Harbin
- Assistant coach: Abby Vampatella
- Home arena: Gallagher Center

2025–26 MAAC women's basketball standings
	Conf.				Overall
Team	W		L	PCT	W		L	PCT
Quinnipiac	19	–	1	.950	27	–	7	.794
Fairfield †	19	–	1	.950	28	–	5	.848
Merrimack	15	–	5	.750	19	–	13	.594
Iona	12	–	8	.600	20	–	12	.625
Siena	11	–	9	.550	13	–	17	.433
Mount St. Mary's	11	–	9	.550	15	–	15	.500
Sacred Heart	10	–	10	.500	13	–	18	.419
Manhattan	10	–	10	.500	11	–	20	.355
Marist	8	–	12	.400	11	–	20	.355
Saint Peter's	6	–	14	.300	7	–	23	.233
Rider	5	–	15	.250	7	–	22	.241
Canisius	3	–	17	.150	5	–	24	.172
Niagara	1	–	19	.050	1	–	28	.034
† 2026 MAAC tournament winner

The 2025–26 Niagara Purple Eagles women's basketball team represented Niagara University during the 2025–26 NCAA Division I women's basketball season. The Purple Eagles, led by 11th-year head coach Jada Pierce, played their home games at the Gallagher Center in Lewiston, New York as members of the Metro Atlantic Athletic Conference (MAAC). They finished the season 1–28, 1–19 in MAAC play, to finish in thirteenth (last) place.

== Previous season ==
The Purple Eagles finished the 2024–25 season 3–25, 2–18 in MAAC play, to finish in thirteenth (last) place. As only the top ten teams in the MAAC qualified for the conference tournament, Niagara did not participate.

== Roster ==
2025–26 Niagara Purple Eagles women's basketball team
Players
Coaches

Pos.	#	Name	Height	Year	Previous school	Hometown
G	1	Chasity Wilson	5 ft 7 in (1.7 m)	Fr	Caravel Academy	Newark, DE
F	2	Jordyn Williams	5 ft 11 in (1.8 m)	So	Cardinal O'Hara	Buffalo, NY
F	3	Jade Campbell	6 ft 0 in (1.83 m)	Jr	St. Francis (PA)	Brooklyn, NY
F	4	Tyasia Freeman	6 ft 1 in (1.85 m)	GS	Augusta	Waynesboro, GA
G	6	Katarina Veljovic	5 ft 11 in (1.8 m)	Fr	Royal Crown Academy	Toronto, ON
G	8	Raven Sims	5 ft 9 in (1.75 m)	Jr	Memphis	Memphis, TN
G	12	Caliana Fenceroy	5 ft 5 in (1.65 m)	GS	Radford	Omaha, NE
G	13	Talia Dial	5 ft 10 in (1.78 m)	Sr	Scottsdale	El Mirage, AZ
F	15	Kenedie Haruna	6 ft 0 in (1.83 m)	Fr	Vanier	Montreal, QC
G	21	Jisca Bila	5 ft 7 in (1.7 m)	Fr	Royal Crown Academy	Ottawa, ON
F	23	Jade Rutledge	5 ft 10 in (1.78 m)	Jr	Cardinal O'Hara	Buffalo, NY

Head coach

- Jada Pierce (West Chester)

Assistant coach(es)

- Brianna Chambers (Cal State Bakersfield)
- Lester Harbin (Lees–McRae)
- Abby Vampatella (Gordon)

Legend

- (C) Team captain
- (S) Suspended
- (I) Ineligible
- (W) Walk-on
- Injured
- Current redshirt

Roster
Last update: March 4, 2026

== Schedule and results ==
Date time, TV	Rank^{#}	Opponent^{#}	Result	Record	Site (attendance) city, state
Exhibition
November 1, 2025*; 2:00 p.m., ESPN+		Brockport	W 115–72	–	Gallagher Center (218); Lewiston, NY
Non-conference regular season
November 7, 2025*; 6:00 p.m., ESPN+		St. Bonaventure	L 56–74	0–1	Gallagher Center (1,347); Lewiston, NY
November 11, 2025*; 2:00 p.m., NEC Front Row		at Stonehill	L 50–65	0–2	Merkert Gymnasium (224); Easton, MA
November 16, 2025*; 3:30 p.m., ESPN+		at Kent State	L 45–92	0–3	MAC Center (1,176); Kent, OH
November 20, 2025*; 6:00 p.m., ESPN+/ACCNX		at Virginia Tech	L 46–83	0–4	Cassell Coliseum (4,099); Blacksburg, VA
November 22, 2025*; 2:00 p.m., ESPN+		at Radford	L 58–80	0–5	Dedmon Center (1,078); Radford, VA
November 26, 2025*; 1:00 p.m., ESPN+		Fordham	L 47–70	0–6	Gallagher Center (129); Lewiston, NY
November 30, 2025*; 1:00 p.m., B1G+		at Ohio State	L 32–130	0–7	Value City Arena (5,239); Columbus, OH
December 3, 2025*; 6:00 p.m., ESPN+		at Buffalo	L 51–77	0–8	Alumni Arena (1,185); Amherst, NY
December 13, 2025*; 2:00 p.m., ESPN+		at Cleveland State	L 52–84	0–9	Wolstein Center (181); Cleveland, OH
MAAC regular season
December 19, 2025; 6:00 p.m., ESPN+		Siena	L 69–107	0–10 (0–1)	Gallagher Center (239); Lewiston, NY
December 21, 2025; 12:00 p.m., ESPN+		Saint Peter's	L 72–81	0–11 (0–2)	Gallagher Center (152); Lewiston, NY
January 1, 2026; 2:00 p.m., ESPN+		at Sacred Heart	L 53–84	0–12 (0–3)	William H. Pitt Center (511); Fairfield, CT
January 3, 2026; 2:00 p.m., ESPN+		at Fairfield	L 42–98	0–13 (0–4)	(834)
January 8, 2026; 11:00 a.m., ESPN+		Iona	L 49-77	0–14 (0–5)	Gallagher Center (1,123); Lewiston, NY
January 10, 2026; 2:00 p.m., ESPN+		Manhattan	L 53–74	0–15 (0–6)	Gallagher Center (251); Lewiston, NY
January 14, 2026; 6:00 p.m., ESPN+		Canisius; Battle of the Bridge	L 41–57	0–16 (0–7)	Gallagher Center (363); Lewiston, NY
January 19, 2026; 1:00 p.m., ESPN+		at Mount St. Mary's	L 49–62	0–17 (0–8)	Knott Arena (638); Emmitsburg, MD
January 22, 2026; 6:00 p.m., ESPN+		Fairfield	L 51–81	0–18 (0–9)	Gallagher Center (210); Lewiston, NY
January 24, 2026; 2:00 p.m., ESPN+		Sacred Heart	L 65–70	0–19 (0–10)	Gallagher Center (234); Lewiston, NY
January 29, 2026; 6:00 p.m., ESPN+		at Siena	L 64–84	0–20 (0–11)	UHY Center (549); Loudonville, NY
January 31, 2026; 2:00 p.m., ESPN+		at Marist	L 52–71	0–21 (0–12)	McCann Arena (594); Poughkeepsie, NY
February 3, 2026; 6:30 p.m., ESPN+		at Canisius; Battle of the Bridge	L 58–74	0–22 (0–13)	Koessler Athletic Center (463); Buffalo, NY
February 7, 2026; 2:00 p.m., ESPN+		Quinnipiac	L 45–89	0–23 (0–14)	Gallagher Center (386); Lewiston, NY
February 12, 2026; 7:00 p.m., ESPN+		at Manhattan	L 42–60	0–24 (0–15)	Draddy Gymnasium (112); Riverdale, NY
February 14, 2026; 1:00 p.m., ESPN+		at Iona	L 55-72	0–25 (0–16)	Hynes Athletics Center (846); New Rochelle, NY
February 19, 2026; 6:00 p.m., ESPN+		Mount St. Mary's	L 57–76	0–26 (0–17)	Gallagher Center (307); Lewiston, NY
February 21, 2026; 2:00 p.m., ESPN+		Rider	W 56–52	1–26 (1–17)	Gallagher Center (428); Lewiston, NY
February 26, 2026; 6:00 p.m., ESPN+		at Quinnipiac	L 38–54	1–27 (1–18)	M&T Bank Arena (437); Hamden, CT
February 28, 2026; 12:00 p.m., ESPN+		at Merrimack	L 56–71	1–28 (1–19)	Hammel Court (287); North Andover, MA
*Non-conference game. ^{#}Rankings from AP poll. (#) Tournament seedings in parentheses. All times are in Eastern.
