= 2025–26 Canisius Golden Griffins women's basketball team =

American college basketball season

2025–26 Canisius Golden Griffins women's basketball
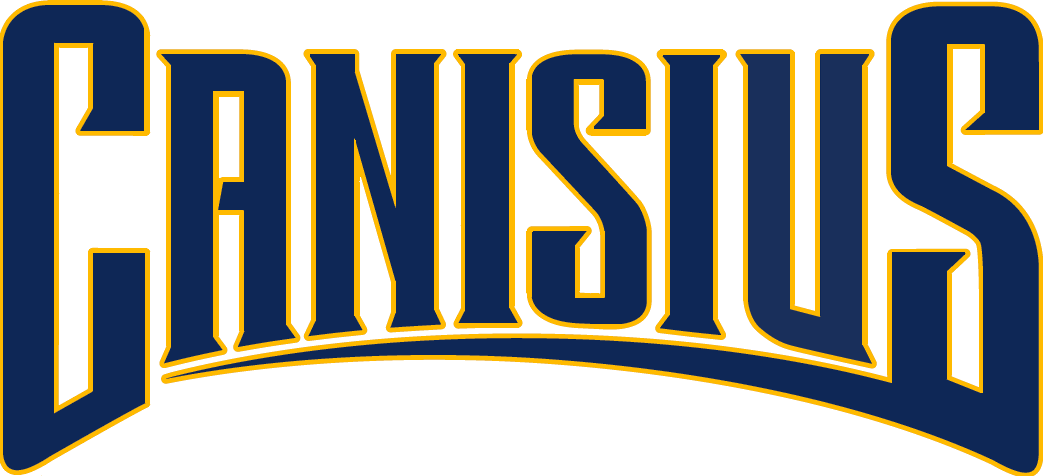
- Conference: Metro Atlantic Athletic Conference
- Record: 5–24 (3–17 MAAC)
- Head coach: Tiffany Swoffard (2nd season)
- Assistant coaches: Lindsay Hieronymus; Stephan Walton; Courtney Roman
- Home arena: Koessler Athletic Center

2025–26 MAAC women's basketball standings
	Conf.				Overall
Team	W		L	PCT	W		L	PCT
Quinnipiac	19	–	1	.950	27	–	7	.794
Fairfield †	19	–	1	.950	28	–	5	.848
Merrimack	15	–	5	.750	19	–	13	.594
Iona	12	–	8	.600	20	–	12	.625
Siena	11	–	9	.550	13	–	17	.433
Mount St. Mary's	11	–	9	.550	15	–	15	.500
Sacred Heart	10	–	10	.500	13	–	18	.419
Manhattan	10	–	10	.500	11	–	20	.355
Marist	8	–	12	.400	11	–	20	.355
Saint Peter's	6	–	14	.300	7	–	23	.233
Rider	5	–	15	.250	7	–	22	.241
Canisius	3	–	17	.150	5	–	24	.172
Niagara	1	–	19	.050	1	–	28	.034
† 2026 MAAC tournament winner

The 2025–26 Canisius Golden Griffins women's basketball team represented Canisius University during the 2025–26 NCAA Division I women's basketball season. The Golden Griffins, led by second-year head coach Tiffany Swoffard, played their home games at the Koessler Athletic Center in Buffalo, New York as members of the Metro Atlantic Athletic Conference.

== Previous season ==
The Golden Griffins finished the 2024–25 season 10–22, 9–11 in MAAC play, to finish in a four-way tie for sixth place. They were defeated by Manhattan in the first round of the MAAC tournament.

== Preseason ==
On September 30, 2025, the Metro Atlantic Athletic Conference released their preseason poll. Canisius was picked to finish ninth in the conference.

=== Preseason rankings ===
MAAC Preseason Poll
Place	Team	Votes
1	Fairfield	169 (13)
2	Quinnipiac	155
3	Mount St. Mary's	132
4	Marist	128
5	Siena	103
6	Iona	100
7	Manhattan	95
8	Merrimack	76
9	Canisius	69
10	Saint Peter's	51
11	Niagara	48
12	Sacred Heart	43
13	Rider	14
(#) first-place votes

=== Preseason All-MAAC Teams ===
Preseason All-MAAC Teams
Team	Player	Position	Year
Third	Shariah Gailes	Forward	Junior

== Roster ==
2025–26 Canisius Golden Griffins women's basketball team
Players
Coaches

Pos.	#	Name	Height	Year	Previous school	Hometown
G	0	Jania Akins	5 ft 10 in (1.78 m)	RS Fr	Mercer	Chicago, Illinois
G	1	Ari Parker	5 ft 10 in (1.78 m)	RS Fr	Cass Technical High School	Detroit, Michigan
G	2	Alex Moses	5 ft 9 in (1.75 m)	So	Duanesburg High School	Delanson, New York
G	3	Mary Copple	5 ft 7 in (1.7 m)	Jr	Brighton High School	Brighton, Michigan
G	4	Corniya Clay	5 ft 5 in (1.65 m)	So	Central Catholic High School	Toledo, Ohio
F	5	Irene Rey Pineda	5 ft 10 in (1.78 m)	So	Movistar Estudiantes B.C.	Madrid, Spain
G	10	Kelsey Bess	5 ft 10 in (1.78 m)	Jr	Harcum College	Philadelphia, Pennsylvania
G	11	Antionique Auston	5 ft 9 in (1.75 m)	Jr	CCBC Essex	Sun Prairie, Wisconsin
G	12	Saige Randolph	5 ft 5 in (1.65 m)	Jr	Albany Academy for Girls	Albany, New York
G	14	Molly Mescall	5 ft 8 in (1.73 m)	Fr	Iroquois High School	Elma, New York
F	15	Ileana Feliz	6 ft 1 in (1.85 m)	So	Cal State Bakersfield	New Milford, Connecticut
C	21	Evie van der Woude	6 ft 5 in (1.96 m)	Jr	Florida Atlantic	Zwolle, Netherlands
G	22	Franka Wittenberg	5 ft 8 in (1.73 m)	Sr	Fresno State	Hildesheim, Germany
F	23/33	Yasmine Djibril	6 ft 1 in (1.85 m)	So	Collège Montmorency	Montreal, Quebec
F	34	Shariah Gailes	6 ft 0 in (1.83 m)	Jr	Illinois–Springfield	Brooklyn, Ohio

Head coach

- Tiffany Swoffard (Austin Peay)

Assistant coach(es)

- Lindsay Hieronymus (Transylvania)
- Stephan Walton (Manitoba)
- Courtney Roman (Penn State)

Legend

- (C) Team captain
- (S) Suspended
- (I) Ineligible
- (W) Walk-on
- Injured
- Current redshirt

Roster
Last update: June 28, 2026

== Schedule and results ==
Date time, TV	Rank^{#}	Opponent^{#}	Result	Record	Site (attendance) city, state
Exhibition
October 26, 2025*; 2:00 pm		at Buffalo	L 63–69	–	Alumni Arena; Amherst, NY
Non-conference regular season
November 4, 2025*; 7:00 pm, B1G+		at No. 13 Michigan	L 40–100	0–1	Crisler Center (2,881); Ann Arbor, MI
November 7, 2025*; 6:30 pm, ESPN+		Eastern Michigan	L 39–70	0–2	Koessler Athletic Center (809); Buffalo, NY
November 11, 2025*; 7:00 pm, ACCNX		at Syracuse	L 72–96	0–3	JMA Wireless Dome (2,405); Syracuse, NY
November 14, 2025*; 6:00 pm, ESPN+		at St. Bonaventure	L 61–66	0–4	Reilly Center (315); St. Bonaventure, NY
November 16, 2025*; 12:00 pm, ESPN+		Cornell	L 50−62	0−5	Koessler Athletic Center (107); Buffalo, NY
November 21, 2025*; 7:00 pm, ESPN+		at Dayton	L 52−61	0−6	UD Arena (2,050); Dayton, OH
November 23, 2025*; 2:00 pm, ESPN+		at Cincinnati	L 57–96	0–7	Fifth Third Arena (1,440); Cincinnati, OH
November 30, 2025*; 1:00 pm, ESPN+		Mercyhurst	W 75–67	1–7	Koessler Athletic Center (424); Buffalo, NY
December 12, 2025*; 6:30 pm, ESPN+		Wright State	W 65–60	2–7	Koessler Athletic Center (466); Buffalo, NY
MAAC regular season
December 19, 2025; 6:30 pm, ESPN+		Saint Peter's	L 49–61	2–8 (0–1)	Koessler Athletic Center (449); Buffalo, NY
December 21, 2025; 1:00 pm, ESPN+		Siena	L 56–73	2–9 (0–2)	Koessler Athletic Center (110); Buffalo, NY
January 1, 2026; 2:00 pm, ESPN+		at Fairfield	L 43−72	2−10 (0–3)	Leo D. Mahoney Arena (905); Fairfield, CT
January 3, 2026; 2:00 pm, ESPN+		at Sacred Heart	L 61–77	2–11 (0–4)	William H. Pitt Center (632); Fairfield, CT
January 8, 2026; 11:00 am, ESPN+		Manhattan	L 43–69	2–12 (0–5)	Koessler Athletic Center (1,697); Buffalo, NY
January 10, 2026; 1:00 pm, ESPN+		Iona	L 51–60	2–13 (0–6)	Koessler Athletic Center (421); Buffalo, NY
January 14, 2026; 6:00 pm, ESPN+		at Niagara; Battle of the Bridge	W 57–41	3–13 (1–6)	Gallagher Center (363); Lewiston, NY
January 17, 2026; 1:00 pm, ESPN+		at Mount St. Mary's	L 64–71	3–14 (1–7)	Knott Arena (729); Emmitsburg, MD
January 22, 2026; 6:30 pm, ESPN+		Sacred Heart	L 55–76	3–15 (1–8)	Koessler Athletic Center (425); Buffalo, NY
January 24, 2026; 1:00 pm, ESPN+		Fairfield	L 42–58	3–16 (1–9)	Koessler Athletic Center (621); Buffalo, NY
January 29, 2026; 5:00 pm, ESPN+		at Marist	L 53–60	3–17 (1–10)	McCann Arena (508); Poughkeepsie, NY
January 31, 2026; 2:00 pm, ESPN+		at Siena	L 65–69 ^{OT}	3–18 (1–11)	UHY Center (685); Loudonville, NY
February 3, 2026; 6:30 pm, ESPN+		Niagara; Battle of the Bridge	W 74–58	4–18 (2–11)	Koessler Athletic Center (463); Buffalo, NY
February 5, 2026; 6:30 pm, ESPN+		Quinnipiac	L 55–73	4–19 (2–12)	Koessler Athletic Center (457); Buffalo, NY
February 12, 2026; 6:00 pm, ESPN+		at Iona	L 45–52	4–20 (2–13)	Hynes Athletics Center (805); New Rochelle, NY
February 14, 2026; 2:00 pm, ESPN+		at Manhattan	L 55–68	4–21 (2–14)	Draddy Gymnasium (181); Riverdale, NY
February 19, 2026; 6:30 pm, ESPN+		Rider	L 53–55 ^{OT}	4–22 (2–15)	Koessler Athletic Center (473); Buffalo, NY
February 21, 2026; 1:00 pm, ESPN+		Mount St. Mary's	W 68–63 ^{OT}	5–22 (3–15)	Koessler Athletic Center (453); Buffalo, NY
February 26, 2026; 7:00 pm, ESPN+		at Merrimack	L 55–71	5–23 (3–16)	Lawler Arena (313); North Andover, MA
February 28, 2026; 2:00 pm, ESPN+		at Quinnipiac	L 37–75	5–24 (3–17)	M&T Bank Arena (663); Hamden, CT
*Non-conference game. ^{#}Rankings from AP Poll. (#) Tournament seedings in parentheses. All times are in Eastern.
