= 2024–25 LIU Sharks women's basketball team =

American college basketball season

2024–25 LIU Sharks women's basketball
- Conference: Northeast Conference
- Record: 6–24 (3–13 NEC)
- Head coach: Rene Haynes (6th season)
- Associate head coach: Terrance Slater
- Assistant coaches: Devin Hill; Kiara Bell
- Home arena: Steinberg Wellness Center

2024–25 Northeast Conference women's basketball standings
| | Conf. | | | | Overall |
| Team | W | | L | PCT | W | | L | PCT |
|---|---|---|---|---|---|---|---|---|
| Fairleigh Dickinson † | 16 | – | 0 | 1.000 | 29 | – | 4 | .879 |
| Stonehill* | 11 | – | 5 | .688 | 17 | – | 16 | .515 |
| Central Connecticut | 10 | – | 6 | .625 | 11 | – | 19 | .367 |
| Saint Francis | 9 | – | 7 | .563 | 11 | – | 19 | .367 |
| Le Moyne* | 6 | – | 10 | .375 | 7 | – | 24 | .226 |
| Mercyhurst* | 6 | – | 10 | .375 | 9 | – | 18 | .333 |
| Chicago State | 6 | – | 10 | .375 | 7 | – | 26 | .212 |
| Wagner | 5 | – | 11 | .313 | 8 | – | 21 | .276 |
| LIU | 3 | – | 13 | .188 | 6 | – | 24 | .200 |
† 2025 NEC tournament winner * ineligible for the 2025 NCAA tournament due to transition from Division II

The 2024–25 LIU Sharks women's basketball team represented Long Island University during the 2024–25 NCAA Division I women's basketball season. The Sharks, who were led by sixth-year head coach Rene Haynes, played their home games at the Steinberg Wellness Center in Brooklyn, New York as members of the Northeast Conference.

== Previous season ==
The Sharks finished the 2023–24 season 8–21, 5–11 in NEC play, to finish in sixth place. They were defeated by Fairleigh Dickinson in the quarterfinals of the NEC tournament.

== Preseason ==
On October 23, 2024, the NEC released their preseason coaches poll. LIU was picked to finish in seventh place in the NEC regular season.

=== Preseason rankings ===
NEC preseason poll
| Predicted finish | Team |
|---|---|
| 1 | Fairleigh Dickinson |
| 2 | Central Connecticut |
| 3 | Le Moyne |
| 4 | Stonehill |
| 5 | Saint Francis |
| 6 | Wagner |
| 7 | LIU |
| T-8 | Mercyhurst |
| T-8 | Chicago State |

=== Preseason All-NEC Team ===
No Sharks were named to the Preseason All-NEC team.

== Roster ==
2024–25 LIU Sharks women's basketball team
Players
Coaches

| Pos. | # | Name | Height | Year | Previous school | Hometown |
|---|---|---|---|---|---|---|
| G | 2 | Sirviva Legions | 5 ft 8 in (1.73 m) | Jr | Southern | Brooklyn, New York |
| F | 3 | Laeticia Hardy | 6 ft 0 in (1.83 m) | Fr | Cégep de Saint-Jean-sur-Richelieu | Montreal, Quebec |
| G | 4 | Kayla Tilus | 5 ft 11 in (1.8 m) | RS So | Notre Dame Catholic High School | Bridgeport, Connecticut |
| G | 5 | Janessa Williams | 5 ft 9 in (1.75 m) | So | The King's Academy | Lake Worth, Florida |
| G | 10 | Estie Varga | 5 ft 8 in (1.73 m) | GS | St. Francis Brooklyn | Kaposvár, Hungary |
| G | 11 | Brianna Mead | 5 ft 7 in (1.7 m) | Fr | Putnam Science Academy | Thompson, Connecticut |
| F | 12 | Shanaii Gamble | 6 ft 0 in (1.83 m) | Fr | Miami Southridge High School | Florida City, Florida |
| F | 14 | Dia Dénes | 6 ft 1 in (1.85 m) | Jr | Szabó lorinc | Budapest, Hungary |
| F | 15 | Nigeria Harkless | 6 ft 2 in (1.88 m) | Sr | Mercer | Jacksonville, Florida |
| G | 21 | Kaiden Glenn | 5 ft 10 in (1.78 m) | Sr | Western Michigan | Ypsilanti, Michigan |
| G | 22 | Racky Kane | 5 ft 10 in (1.78 m) | So | South Shore High School | New York, New York |
| G | 23 | Candela García-Escribano | 5 ft 11 in (1.8 m) | Fr | IES Eijo y Garay | Madrid, Spain |
| F | 24 | Gisela Segura | 5 ft 11 in (1.8 m) | GS | Franklin Pierce | Cervera, Spain |
| F | 25 | Amaya Dowdy | 6 ft 0 in (1.83 m) | Sr | UMass Lowell | Woonsocket, Rhode Island |
| F | 32 | Celine Mukura | 6 ft 5 in (1.96 m) | Sr | Layton Christian Academy | Kicukiro, Rwanda |
| F | 34 | Patricia Sherrill | 6 ft 1 in (1.85 m) | GS | New Orleans | Alexandria, Virginia |

Head coach

- Rene Haynes (Michigan State)

Assistant coach(es)

- Terrance Slater (Western Michigan)
- Devin Hill (DePaul)
- Kiara Bell (UMBC)

Legend

- (C) Team captain
- (S) Suspended
- (I) Ineligible
- (W) Walk-on
- Injured
- Current redshirt

Roster
Last update: May 5, 2025

== Schedule and results ==
| Date time, TV | Rank^{#} | Opponent^{#} | Result | Record | Site (attendance) city, state |
Non-conference regular season
| November 4, 2024*; 6:00 pm, ESPN+ | | at Lehigh | L 59–83 | 0–1 | Stabler Arena (467); Bethlehem, PA |
| November 8, 2024*; 6:00 pm, NEC Front Row | | St. John's | L 50–67 | 0–2 | Steinberg Wellness Center (78); Brooklyn, NY |
| November 10, 2024*; 1:00 pm, NEC Front Row | | Cal State Fullerton | W 63–52 | 1–2 | Steinberg Wellness Center (121); Brooklyn, NY |
| November 12, 2024*; 7:00 pm, NEC Front Row | | Rider | L 54–66 | 1–3 | Steinberg Wellness Center (89); Brooklyn, NY |
| November 14, 2024*; 7:00 pm, ESPN+ | | at Manhattan | L 50–73 | 1–4 | Draddy Gymnasium (313); Riverdale, NY |
| November 20, 2024*; 5:30 pm, B1G+ | | at Michigan | L 31–96 | 1–5 | Crisler Center (2,012); Ann Arbor, MI |
| November 22, 2024*; 6:00 pm, NEC Front Row | | Binghamton | L 54–65 | 1–6 | Steinberg Wellness Center (250); Brooklyn, NY |
| December 1, 2024*; 2:00 pm, NEC Front Row | | Northeastern | W 63–61 | 2–6 | Steinberg Wellness Center (269); Brooklyn, NY |
| December 8, 2024*; 2:30 pm, ESPN+ | | at Fordham | L 43–62 | 2–7 | Rose Hill Gymnasium; Bronx, NY |
| December 11, 2024*; 7:00 pm, ESPN+ | | at Saint Peter's | L 37–51 | 2–8 | Run Baby Run Arena (268); Jersey City, NJ |
| December 14, 2024*; 2:00 pm, NEC Front Row | | Delaware State | W 65–63 ^{OT} | 3–8 | Steinberg Wellness Center (100); Brooklyn, NY |
| December 21, 2024*; 1:00 pm, ESPN+ | | at VCU | L 42–72 | 3–9 | Siegel Center (454); Richmond, VA |
| December 30, 2024*; 7:00 pm, NEC Front Row | | NJIT | L 60–89 | 3–10 | Steinberg Wellness Center (89); Brooklyn, NY |
NEC regular season
| January 2, 2025; 2:00 pm, NEC Front Row | | Le Moyne | W 59–48 | 4–10 (1–0) | Steinberg Wellness Center (58); Brooklyn, NY |
| January 4, 2025; 2:00 pm, NEC Front Row | | at Chicago State | L 59–64 ^{OT} | 4–11 (1–1) | Jones Convocation Center; Chicago, IL |
| January 9, 2025; 7:00 pm, NEC Front Row | | at Central Connecticut | L 48–52 | 4–12 (1–2) | William H. Detrick Gymnasium (211); New Britain, CT |
| January 11, 2025; 2:00 pm, NEC Front Row | | Stonehill | L 50–61 | 4–13 (1–3) | Steinberg Wellness Center (96); Brooklyn, NY |
| January 18, 2025; 4:00 pm, NEC Front Row | | at Saint Francis | L 54–63 | 4–14 (1–4) | DeGol Arena (451); Loretto, PA |
| January 20, 2025; 1:00 pm, NEC Front Row | | at Mercyhurst | L 51–78 | 4–15 (1–5) | Owen McCormick Court (309); Erie, PA |
| January 23, 2025; 7:00 pm, NEC Front Row | | Saint Francis | W 63–56 | 5–15 (2–5) | Steinberg Wellness Center (188); Brooklyn, NY |
| January 25, 2025; 2:00 pm, NEC Front Row | | Mercyhurst | L 58–73 | 5–16 (2–6) | Steinberg Wellness Center (118); Brooklyn, NY |
| February 1, 2025; 2:00 pm, NEC Front Row | | Chicago State | L 49–55 | 5–17 (2–7) | Steinberg Wellness Center (178); Brooklyn, NY |
| February 6, 2025; 7:00 pm, NEC Front Row | | Wagner | W 80–79 ^{3OT} | 6–17 (3–7) | Steinberg Wellness Center (109); Brooklyn, NY |
| February 8, 2025; 2:00 pm, NEC Front Row | | at Stonehill | L 50–58 | 6–18 (3–8) | Merkert Gymnasium (852); Easton, MA |
| February 15, 2025; 1:00 pm, NEC Front Row | | at Fairleigh Dickinson | L 45–75 | 6–19 (3–9) | Bogota Savings Bank Center (239); Hackensack, NJ |
| February 22, 2025; 12:00 pm, NEC Front Row | | at Le Moyne | L 53–83 | 6–20 (3–10) | Ted Grant Court (383); DeWitt, NY |
| February 27, 2025; 7:00 pm, NEC Front Row | | at Wagner | L 58–66 | 6–21 (3–11) | Spiro Sports Center; Staten Island, NY |
| March 1, 2025; 2:00 pm, NEC Front Row | | Fairleigh Dickinson | L 46–73 | 6–22 (3–12) | Steinberg Wellness Center (123); Brooklyn, NY |
| March 6, 2025; 7:00 pm, NEC Front Row | | Central Connecticut | L 63–68 | 6–23 (3–13) | Steinberg Wellness Center (123); Brooklyn, NY |
NEC tournament
| March 10, 2025; 7:00 pm, NEC Front Row | (8) | at (1) Fairleigh Dickinson; Quarterfinals | L 44–73 | 6–24 | Bogota Savings Bank Center (309); Hackensack, NJ |
*Non-conference game. ^{#}Rankings from AP Poll. (#) Tournament seedings in parentheses. All times are in Eastern.
