= 2024–25 Wagner Seahawks women's basketball team =

American college basketball season

2024–25 Wagner Seahawks women's basketball
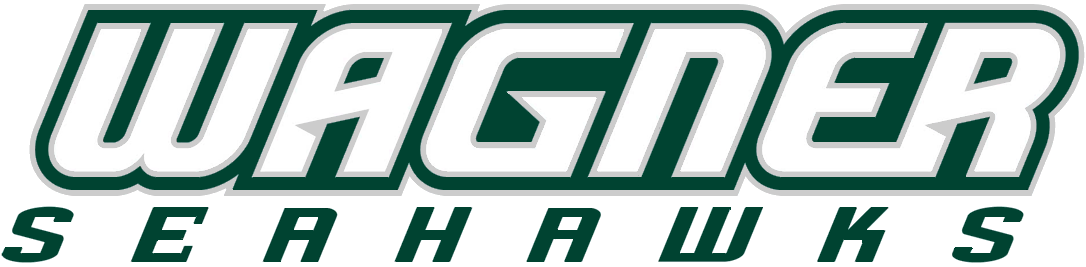
- Conference: Northeast Conference
- Record: 8–21 (5–11 NEC)
- Head coach: Terrell Coburn (4th season)
- Assistant coaches: Alycia Gervais; Alexis Lloyd; Cheri Eleazer
- Home arena: Spiro Sports Center

2024–25 Northeast Conference women's basketball standings
	Conf.				Overall
Team	W		L	PCT	W		L	PCT
Fairleigh Dickinson †	16	–	0	1.000	29	–	4	.879
Stonehill*	11	–	5	.688	17	–	16	.515
Central Connecticut	10	–	6	.625	11	–	19	.367
Saint Francis	9	–	7	.563	11	–	19	.367
Le Moyne*	6	–	10	.375	7	–	24	.226
Mercyhurst*	6	–	10	.375	9	–	18	.333
Chicago State	6	–	10	.375	7	–	26	.212
Wagner	5	–	11	.313	8	–	21	.276
LIU	3	–	13	.188	6	–	24	.200
† 2025 NEC tournament winner * ineligible for the 2025 NCAA tournament due to transition from Division II

The 2024–25 Wagner Seahawks women's basketball team represented Wagner College during the 2024–25 NCAA Division I women's basketball season. The Seahawks, who were led by fourth-year head coach Terrell Coburn, played their home games at the Spiro Sports Center in Staten Island, New York as members of the Northeast Conference.

== Previous season ==
The Seahawks finished the 2023–24 season 7–21, 4–12 in NEC play, to finish in a three-way tie for seventh place. Due to tiebreakers, they failed to qualify for the NEC tournament, as only the top eight teams qualify for the tournament.

== Preseason ==
On October 23, 2024, the NEC released their preseason coaches poll. Wagner was picked to finish sixth in the NEC regular season.

=== Preseason rankings ===
NEC preseason poll
Predicted finish	Team
1	Fairleigh Dickinson
2	Central Connecticut
3	Le Moyne
4	Stonehill
5	Saint Francis
6	Wagner
7	LIU
T-8	Mercyhurst
T-8	Chicago State

=== Preseason All-NEC Team ===
Preseason All-NEC Team
Player	Position	Year
Taleah Washington	Guard	Graduate student

== Roster ==
2024–25 Wagner Seahawks women's basketball team
Players
Coaches

Pos.	#	Name	Height	Year	Previous school	Hometown
G	0	Klea Kaci	5 ft 11 in (1.8 m)	RS So	Purdue Fort Wayne	Mississauga, Ontario
G	1	Taleah Washington	5 ft 7 in (1.7 m)	GS	Old Dominion	District Heights, Maryland
G	3	KC Carter	5 ft 8 in (1.73 m)	GS	Cornell	Brooklyn, New York
G	4	Elle Johansson	5 ft 5 in (1.65 m)	Fr	Luleå Basket	Luleå, Sweden
G	5	Maria Doreste	5 ft 9 in (1.75 m)	Jr	Fresno State	Las Palmas, Spain
F	10	Shamique Cummings	6 ft 0 in (1.83 m)	So	Champlain College Saint-Lambert	Montreal, Quebec
F	11	Malia Mpondo	6 ft 2 in (1.88 m)	Jr	International School of Geneva	Founex, Switzerland
G	12	Irene Fernandez de Caleya	5 ft 10 in (1.78 m)	Jr	Casper College	Tarragona, Spain
G	13	Keana Foz	5 ft 8 in (1.73 m)	Fr	Fort Erie International Academy	Mississauga, Ontario
G	14	Angélie Ricard	5 ft 10 in (1.78 m)	Jr	Cégep de Saint-Jean-sur-Richelieu	Orford, Quebec
C	21	Hawa Balde-Camara	6 ft 4 in (1.93 m)	Jr	Queens	Pineda de Mar, Spain
F	22	Raneem ElBarky	6 ft 1 in (1.85 m)	GS	Shaw	Cairo, Egypt
G	23	Julia Fabozzi	6 ft 1 in (1.85 m)	GS	Providence	Staten Island, New York
C	30/32	Lijirin Doyinsola Modesayor	6 ft 3 in (1.91 m)	So	Topfield Secondary School	Ondo State, Nigeria

Head coach

- Terrell Coburn (Central Arkansas)

Assistant coach(es)

- Alycia Gervais (Daniel Webster)
- Alexis Lloyd (USC)
- Cheri Eleazer (Hartford)

Legend

- (C) Team captain
- (S) Suspended
- (I) Ineligible
- (W) Walk-on
- Injured
- Current redshirt

Roster
Last update: May 5, 2025

== Schedule and results ==
Date time, TV	Rank^{#}	Opponent^{#}	Result	Record	Site (attendance) city, state
Non-conference regular season
November 4, 2024*; 7:00 pm, NEC Front Row		Saint Elizabeth	W 83–39	1–0	Spiro Sports Center (247); Staten Island, NY
November 7, 2024*; 7:00 pm, FloHoops		at Seton Hall	L 40–84	1–1	Walsh Gymnasium (750); South Orange, NJ
November 14, 2024*; 7:00 pm, ESPN+		at Navy	L 46–79	1–2	Alumni Hall (302); Annapolis, MD
November 22, 2024*; 7:00 pm, NEC Front Row		Northeastern	L 56–71	1–3	Spiro Sports Center (226); Staten Island, NY
November 26, 2024*; 6:00 pm, ESPN+		at Iona	L 51–70	1–4	Hynes Athletics Center (1,138); New Rochelle, NY
November 29, 2024*; 12:00 pm, ESPN+		at FIU; FIU Thanksgiving Classic	L 52–87	1–5	Ocean Bank Convocation Center; Miami, FL
December 1, 2024*; 11:00 am		vs. Sacramento State; FIU Thanksgiving Classic	L 34–73	1–6	Ocean Bank Convocation Center (431); Miami, FL
December 8, 2024*; 2:00 pm, ESPN+		at Lafayette	L 45–74	1–7	Kirby Sports Center (207); Easton, PA
December 12, 2024*; 7:00 pm, NEC Front Row		NJIT	W 62–60	2–7	Spiro Sports Center (215); Staten Island, NY
December 15, 2024*; 2:00 pm, B1G+		at Rutgers	L 48–86	2–8	Jersey Mike's Arena (1,463); Piscataway, NJ
December 21, 2024*; 12:00 pm, NEC Front Row		Columbia	L 53–77	2–9	Spiro Sports Center (323); Staten Island, NY
December 30, 2024*; 2:00 pm, NEC Front Row		Old Westbury	W 133–34	3–9	Spiro Sports Center; Staten Island, NY
NEC regular season
January 2, 2025; 7:00 pm, NEC Front Row		at Chicago State	W 85–73	4–9 (1–0)	Jones Convocation Center (196); Chicago, IL
January 4, 2025; 2:00 pm, NEC Front Row		at Fairleigh Dickinson	L 49–75	4–10 (1–1)	Bogota Savings Bank Center (279); Hackensack, NJ
January 11, 2025; 4:00 pm, NEC Front Row		Central Connecticut	L 55–62	4–11 (1–2)	Spiro Sports Center; Staten Island, NY
January 18, 2025; 1:00 pm, NEC Front Row		at Mercyhurst	W 71–63	5–11 (2–2)	Owen McCormick Court (234); Erie, PA
January 20, 2025; 7:00 pm, ESPN+		at Saint Francis	L 47–51	5–12 (2–3)	DeGol Arena (401); Loretto, PA
January 23, 2025; 7:00 pm, NEC Front Row		Mercyhurst	L 57–63	5–13 (2–4)	Spiro Sports Center (187); Staten Island, NY
January 25, 2025; 4:00 pm, NEC Front Row		Saint Francis	L 48–50	5–14 (2–5)	Spiro Sports Center (200); Staten Island, NY
February 1, 2025; 12:00 pm, NEC Front Row		at Le Moyne	L 52–62	5–15 (2–6)	Ted Grant Court (322); DeWitt, NY
February 6, 2025; 7:00 pm, NEC Front Row		at LIU	L 79–80 ^{3OT}	5–16 (2–7)	Steinberg Wellness Center (109); Brooklyn, NY
February 8, 2025; 4:00 pm, NEC Front Row		Fairleigh Dickinson	L 41–54	5–17 (2–8)	Spiro Sports Center (300); Staten Island, NY
February 13, 2025; 7:00 pm, NEC Front Row		Le Moyne	W 61–56	6–17 (3–8)	Spiro Sports Center (200); Staten Island, NY
February 20, 2025; 7:00 pm, NEC Front Row		at Stonehill	L 64–77	6–18 (3–9)	Merkert Gymnasium (464); Easton, MA
February 22, 2025; 1:00 pm, NEC Front Row		Chicago State	W 58–52	7–18 (4–9)	Spiro Sports Center (280); Staten Island, NY
February 27, 2025; 7:00 pm, NEC Front Row		LIU	W 66–58	8–18 (5–9)	Spiro Sports Center; Staten Island, NY
March 1, 2025; 1:00 pm, NEC Front Row		at Central Connecticut	L 65–76	8–19 (5–10)	William H. Detrick Gymnasium (311); New Britain, CT
March 6, 2025; 7:00 pm, NEC Front Row		Stonehill	L 60–68	8–20 (5–11)	Spiro Sports Center (834); Staten Island, NY
NEC tournament
March 10, 2025; 7:00 pm, NEC Front Row	(7)	at (2) Stonehill; Quarterfinals	L 50–72	8–21	Merkert Gymnasium (437); Easton, MA
*Non-conference game. ^{#}Rankings from AP Poll. (#) Tournament seedings in parentheses. All times are in Eastern.
