= 2024–25 Le Moyne Dolphins women's basketball team =

American college basketball season

2024–25 Le Moyne Dolphins women's basketball
- Conference: Northeast Conference
- Record: 7–24 (6–10 NEC)
- Head coach: Nick DiPillo (1st season)
- Assistant coaches: Katie Kolinski; Casey Filiault; Mya Jackson
- Home arena: Le Moyne Events Center

2024–25 Northeast Conference women's basketball standings
	Conf.				Overall
Team	W		L	PCT	W		L	PCT
Fairleigh Dickinson †	16	–	0	1.000	29	–	4	.879
Stonehill*	11	–	5	.688	17	–	16	.515
Central Connecticut	10	–	6	.625	11	–	19	.367
Saint Francis	9	–	7	.563	11	–	19	.367
Le Moyne*	6	–	10	.375	7	–	24	.226
Mercyhurst*	6	–	10	.375	9	–	18	.333
Chicago State	6	–	10	.375	7	–	26	.212
Wagner	5	–	11	.313	8	–	21	.276
LIU	3	–	13	.188	6	–	24	.200
† 2025 NEC tournament winner * ineligible for the 2025 NCAA tournament due to transition from Division II

The 2024–25 Le Moyne Dolphins women's basketball team represented Le Moyne College during the 2024–25 NCAA Division I women's basketball season. The Dolphins, led by first-year head coach Nick DiPillo, played their home games on Ted Grant Court in the Le Moyne Events Center in DeWitt, New York (Note: Though the campus, including the Le Moyne Events Center, has a Syracuse mailing address it lies within the adjacent town of DeWitt.) as second-year members of the Northeast Conference (NEC) and as an NCAA Division I program.

The Dolphins finished the season with a 7–24 record, 6–10 in NEC play, to finish in a three-way tie for fifth place. In the NEC tournament, they defeated Saint Francis in the quarterfinals before being eliminated by Stonehill in the semifinals.

== Previous season ==
The Dolphins finished the 2023–24 season 18–15, 14–2 in NEC play, to finish in second place. They were bested by top seed Sacred Heart in the championship of the NEC tournament. The Dolphins received an automatic bid to the WNIT, where they were defeated by Niagara in the first round.

On April 24, 2024, head coach Mary Grimes departed from the program after three seasons after being hired as the head coach of Binghamton. The Dolphins hired Bowling Green assistant Nick DiPillo as their new head coach on May 23.

== Roster ==
2024–25 Le Moyne Dolphins women's basketball team
Players
Coaches

Pos.	#	Name	Height	Year	Previous school	Hometown
G	0	Jessica Wangolo	5 ft 7 in (1.7 m)	So	Buffalo	Ottawa, ON
G	2	Eli Clark	5 ft 8 in (1.73 m)	Fr	Ocean Township High School	Oakhurst, NJ
G	3	Mia Yanogacio	5 ft 7 in (1.7 m)	Sr	Delaware	Somerset, NJ
G	4	Sierra Linnin	5 ft 8 in (1.73 m)	Jr	Albertus Magnus High School	Valley Cottage, NY
G	5	Michelina Lombardi	5 ft 6 in (1.68 m)	Jr	Averill Park High School	Wynantskill, NY
G	11	Zhara Adeyemi	5 ft 10 in (1.78 m)	So	South Shore High School	Brooklyn, NY
F	12	Sydney Postell	5 ft 10 in (1.78 m)	So	Churchville-Chili High School	Churchville, NY
G	21	Amya McLeod	5 ft 6 in (1.68 m)	RS Fr	Youngstown State	Rome, NY
G	24	Megan Bodziony	5 ft 10 in (1.78 m)	GS	Bryant	Wakefield, RI
G	23	Emily Florvil	5 ft 6 in (1.68 m)	Sr	Nazareth High School	Brooklyn, NY
F	24	Haedyn Roberts	6 ft 1 in (1.85 m)	GS	Holland Patent High School	Holland Patent, NY
F	32	Noelle Cabiness	6 ft 0 in (1.83 m)	Fr	Briar Woods High School	Ashburn, VA
F	44	Brianna Williams	6 ft 1 in (1.85 m)	Sr	Hartford	Brampton, ON

Head coach

- Nick DiPillo (Fairleigh Dickinson)

Assistant coach(es)

- Katie Kolinski (Syracuse)
- Casey Filiault (Kean)
- Mya Jackson (Cincinnati)

Legend

- (C) Team captain
- (S) Suspended
- (I) Ineligible
- (W) Walk-on
- Injured
- Current redshirt

Roster

== Schedule and results ==
Date time, TV	Rank^{#}	Opponent^{#}	Result	Record	Site (attendance) city, state
Exhibition
October 29, 2024*; 6:00 p.m.		SUNY Geneseo	W 55–48	–	Ted Grant Court (258); DeWitt, NY
Non-conference regular season
November 4, 2024*; 10:00 p.m., ACCNX		at Stanford	L 43–107	0–1	Maples Pavilion (2,887); Stanford, CA
November 7, 2024*; 6:31 p.m., FloSports		at Stony Brook	L 43–53	0–2	Island Federal Arena (636); Stony Brook, NY
November 10, 2024*; 12:00 p.m.		Rhode Island	L 51–76	0–3	Ted Grant Court (351); DeWitt, NY
November 17, 2024*; 3:00 p.m., ESPN+		at Illinois State	L 55–71	0–4	CEFCU Arena; Normal, IL
November 18, 2024*; 12:00 p.m., BTN+		at No. 22 Illinois	L 25–94	0–5	State Farm Center (13,486); Champaign, IL
November 29, 2024*; 11:00 a.m.		vs. UNC Greensboro; Puerto Rico Clasico	L 61–83	0–6	Coliseo Rubén Rodríguez (100); Bayamón, Puerto Rico
November 30, 2024*; 10:30 a.m.		vs. Southern Indiana; Puerto Rico Clasico	L 42–71	0–7	Coliseo Rubén Rodríguez (100); Bayamón, Puerto Rico
December 5, 2024*; 6:00 p.m., NEC Front Row		Boston University	L 55–60	0–8	Ted Grant Court (305); DeWitt, NY
December 7, 2024*; 12:00 p.m., NEC Front Row		UMass Lowell	L 56–69	0–9	Ted Grant Court (256); DeWitt, NY
December 14, 2024*; 1:00 p.m., FloHoops		at Seton Hall	L 41–68	0–10	Walsh Gymnasium (848); South Orange, NJ
December 21, 2024*; 12:00 p.m., NEC Front Row		Colgate	L 45–69	0–11	Ted Grant Court (259); DeWitt, NY
December 28, 2024*; 12:00 p.m., NEC Front Row		Buffalo	L 59–107	0–12	Ted Grant Court (259); DeWitt, NY
December 31, 2024*; 12:00 p.m., ESPN+		at Princeton	L 43–75	0–13	Jadwin Gymnasium (796); Princeton, NJ
NEC regular season
January 2, 2025; 2:00 p.m., NEC Front Row		at LIU	L 48–59	0–14 (0–1)	Steinberg Wellness Center (58); Brooklyn, NY
January 9, 2025; 6:00 p.m., NEC Front Row		at Mercyhurst	L 52–63	0–15 (0–2)	Mercyhurst Athletic Center (178); Erie, PA
January 11, 2025; 4:00 p.m., NEC Front Row		at Saint Francis	L 41–73	0–16 (0–3)	DeGol Arena (394); Loretto, PA
January 18, 2025; 12:00 p.m., NEC Front Row		Chicago State	W 77–71 ^{OT}	1–16 (1–3)	Ted Grant Court (377); DeWitt, NY
January 20, 2025; 5:30 p.m., NEC Front Row		Stonehill	W 69–67	2–16 (2–3)	Ted Grant Court (369); DeWitt, NY
January 25, 2025; 1:00 p.m., NEC Front Row		at Central Connecticut	L 50–67	2–17 (2–4)	William H. Detrick Gymnasium (449); New Britain, CT
February 1, 2025; 12:00 p.m., NEC Front Row		Wagner	W 62–52	3–17 (3–4)	Ted Grant Court (322); DeWitt, NY
February 6, 2025; 6:00 p.m., NEC Front Row		Saint Francis	L 60–66 ^{OT}	3–18 (3–5)	Ted Grant Court (266); DeWitt, NY
February 8, 2025; 12:00 p.m., NEC Front Row		Mercyhurst	W 60–58	4–18 (4–5)	Ted Grant Court (368); DeWitt, NY
February 13, 2025; 7:00 p.m., NEC Front Row		at Wagner	L 56–61	4–19 (4–6)	Spiro Sports Center (200); Staten Island, NY
February 15, 2025; 2:00 p.m., NEC Front Row		at Chicago State	L 60–76	4–20 (4–7)	Jones Convocation Center; Chicago, IL
February 20, 2025; 7:00 p.m., ESPNU		at Fairleigh Dickinson	L 46–65	4–21 (4–8)	Bogota Savings Bank Center (900); Hackensack, NJ
February 22, 2025; 12:00 p.m., NEC Front Row		Le Moyne	W 83–53	5–21 (5–8)	Ted Grant Court (383); DeWitt, NY
February 27, 2025; 6:00 p.m., NEC Front Row		Central Connecticut	W 75–64	6–21 (6–8)	Ted Grant Court (275); DeWitt, NY
March 1, 2025; 1:00 p.m., NEC Front Row		at Stonehill	L 61–65	6–22 (6–9)	Merkert Gymnasium (532); Easton, MA
March 6, 2025; 6:00 p.m., NEC Front Row		Fairleigh Dickinson	L 48–64	6–23 (6–10)	Ted Grant Court (364); DeWitt, NY
NEC tournament
March 10, 2025; 7:00 p.m., NEC Front Row	(5)	at (4) Saint Francis; Quarterfinals	W 62–51	7–23	DeGol Arena (585); Loretto, PA
March 13, 2025; 7:00 p.m., ESPN+	(5)	at (2) Stonehill; Semifinals	L 41–60	7–24	Merkert Gymnasium (925); North Easton, MA
*Non-conference game. ^{#}Rankings from AP poll. (#) Tournament seedings in parentheses. All times are in Eastern.
