= 2024–25 Stonehill Skyhawks women's basketball team =

American college basketball season

2024–1925 Stonehill Skyhawks women's basketball

WNIT, First Round
- Conference: Northeast Conference
- Record: 17–16 (11–5 NEC)
- Head coach: Trisha Brown (24th season)
- Assistant coaches: Marcus Reilly; Jill Conroy; Janelle Harrison
- Home arena: Merkert Gymnasium

2024–25 Northeast Conference women's basketball standings
	Conf.				Overall
Team	W		L	PCT	W		L	PCT
Fairleigh Dickinson †	16	–	0	1.000	29	–	4	.879
Stonehill*	11	–	5	.688	17	–	16	.515
Central Connecticut	10	–	6	.625	11	–	19	.367
Saint Francis	9	–	7	.563	11	–	19	.367
Le Moyne*	6	–	10	.375	7	–	24	.226
Mercyhurst*	6	–	10	.375	9	–	18	.333
Chicago State	6	–	10	.375	7	–	26	.212
Wagner	5	–	11	.313	8	–	21	.276
LIU	3	–	13	.188	6	–	24	.200
† 2025 NEC tournament winner * ineligible for the 2025 NCAA tournament due to transition from Division II

The 2024–25 Stonehill Skyhawks women's basketball team represent Stonehill College during the 2024–25 NCAA Division I women's basketball season. The Skyhawks, who were led by 24th-year head coach Trisha Brown, played their home games at Merkert Gymnasium in Easton, Massachusetts as members of the Northeast Conference (NEC).

This season is Stonehill's third year of a four-year transition period from Division II to Division I. As a result, the Skyhawks are not eligible for NCAA postseason play until the 2026–27 season.

== Previous season ==
The Skyhawks finished the 2023–24 season 4–26, 4–12 in NEC play, to finish in a three-way tie for seventh place. They were upset by Le Moyne in the quarterfinals of the NEC tournament.

== Roster ==
2024–25 Stonehill Skyhawks women's basketball team
Players
Coaches

Pos.	#	Name	Height	Year	Previous school	Hometown
G	1	Shira Elkis	5 ft 6 in (1.68 m)	Fr	Hoff HaSharon	Givat Haim Ichud, Israel
G	2	Sydney McLaughlin	5 ft 11 in (1.8 m)	Fr	Hanover High School	Hanover, NH
G	3	Brooke Paquette	5 ft 8 in (1.73 m)	So	Bishop Guertin High School	Hudson, NH
G	4	Molly Lynch	5 ft 8 in (1.73 m)	GS	Rider	Sea Girt, New Jersey
G	5	Chelsea Graiver	5 ft 6 in (1.68 m)	Jr	Greely High School	Falmouth, ME
G	10	Sharn Hayward	5 ft 6 in (1.68 m)	Sr	Marist Regional College	Penguin, Australia
G	12	Breana Delaney	5 ft 9 in (1.75 m)	So	St. John Vianney High School	Marlboro, NJ
C	13	Isabella Mallory	6 ft 2 in (1.88 m)	So	E. O. Smith High School	Mansfield Center, CT
F	22	Emma Arcà	6 ft 1 in (1.85 m)	So	St. Andrew's School	Rome, Italy
C	21	Kylie Swider	6 ft 4 in (1.93 m)	GS	Villanova	Portsmouth, RI
F/C	22	Megan Sias	6 ft 1 in (1.85 m)	Fr	Toms River High School North	Toms River, NJ
G	25	Phoena Dadson	5 ft 10 in (1.78 m)	Fr	Kent School	Winneba, Ghana
G/F	30	Catelyn Wheeler	5 ft 10 in (1.78 m)	So	Bishop Guertin High School	Tyngsborough, MA
F	31	Paige Martin	6 ft 0 in (1.83 m)	Jr	St. Francis Brooklyn	Hastings-on-Hudson, NY
F	32	Julia Webster	6 ft 0 in (1.83 m)	Fr	Bishop Feehan High School	Cumberland, RI
F	44	Maureen Stapleton	6 ft 0 in (1.83 m)	Sr	St. Rose High School	Spring Lake Heights, NJ

Head coach

- Trisha Brown (Harvard)

Assistant coach(es)

- Marcus Reilly (Trinity (CT))
- Jill Conroy (Holy Family)
- Janelle Harrison (Hartford)

Legend

- (C) Team captain
- (S) Suspended
- (I) Ineligible
- (W) Walk-on
- Injured
- Current redshirt

Roster
Last update: December 5, 2024

== Schedule and results ==
Date time, TV	Rank^{#}	Opponent^{#}	Result	Record	Site (attendance) city, state
Non-conference regular season
November 4, 2024*; 5:30 p.m., ESPN+		at Rhode Island	L 45–68	0–1	Ryan Center (3,810); Kingston, RI
November 7, 2024*; 7:00 p.m., NEC Front Row		Emmanuel	W 79–36	1–1	Merkert Gymnasium (216); Easton, MA
November 13, 2024*; 4:00 p.m., ESPN+		at Utah Tech	W 89–86	2–1	Burns Arena (327); St. George, UT
November 15, 2024*; 9:30 p.m., MW Network		at UNLV	L 57–93	2–2	Cox Pavilion (835); Paradise, NV
November 22, 2024*; 6:00 p.m., ESPN+		at Bryant	L 71–82	2–3	Chace Athletic Center (391); Smithfield, RI
November 26, 2024*; 7:00 p.m., NEC Front Row		Maine	L 75–87	2–4	Merkert Gymnasium (273); Easton, MA
December 1, 2024*; 1:00 p.m., NEC Front Row		Albany	L 59–80	2–5	Merkert Gymnasium (216); Easton, MA
December 5, 2024*; 7:00 p.m., ESPN+		at Brown	L 45–78	2–6	Pizzitola Sports Center (326); Providence, RI
December 10, 2024*; 7:00 p.m., NEC Front Row		Dartmouth	W 75–43	3–6	Merkert Gymnasium (117); Easton, MA
December 14, 2024*; 6:00 p.m., ESPN+		at Rider	L 53–65	3–7	Alumni Gymnasium (584); Lawrenceville, NJ
December 18, 2024*; 11:00 a.m., NESN/FloSports		at Northeastern	W 65–49	4–7	Cabot Center (1,003); Boston, MA
December 21, 2024*; 1:00 p.m., FloSports		at Marquette	L 42–87	4–8	Al McGuire Center (1,950); Milwaukee, WI
December 30, 2024*; 4:00 p.m., NEC Front Row		New Hampshire	L 57–74	4–9	Merkert Gymnasium (474); Easton, MA
NEC regular season
January 2, 2025; 7:00 p.m., NEC Front Row		Mercyhurst	W 72–54	5–9 (1–0)	Merkert Gymnasium (223); Easton, MA
January 4, 2025; 2:00 p.m., NEC Front Row		Saint Francis	W 73–59	6–9 (2–0)	Merkert Gymnasium (219); Easton, MA
January 9, 2025; 7:00 p.m., NEC Front Row		Chicago State	W 77–75 ^{2OT}	7–9 (3–0)	Merkert Gymnasium (127); Easton, MA
January 11, 2025; 2:00 p.m., NEC Front Row		at LIU	W 61–50	8–9 (4–0)	Steinberg Wellness Center (96); Brooklyn, NY
January 20, 2025; 5:30 p.m., NEC Front Row		at Le Moyne	L 67–69	8–10 (4–1)	Ted Grant Court (369); DeWitt, NY
January 23, 2025; 7:00 p.m., NEC Front Row		Fairleigh Dickinson	L 54–72	8–11 (4–2)	Merkert Gymnasium (242); Easton, MA
January 25, 2025; 2:00 p.m., NEC Front Row		at Chicago State	W 66–64	9–11 (5–2)	Jones Convocation Center (113); Chicago, IL
February 1, 2025; TBA, NEC Front Row		at Central Connecticut	L 59–71	9–12 (5–3)	William H. Detrick Gymnasium (324); New Britain, CT
February 8, 2025; 2:00 p.m., NEC Front Row		at LIU	W 58–50	10–12 (6–3)	Merkert Gymnasium (852); Easton, MA
February 13, 2025; 7:00 p.m., NEC Front Row		at Saint Francis	W 74–43	11–12 (7–3)	DeGol Arena (502); Loretto, PA
February 15, 2025; 1:00 p.m., NEC Front Row		at Mercyhurst	W 69–62	12–12 (8–3)	Mercyhurst Athletic Center (490); Erie, PA
February 20, 2025; 7:00 p.m., NEC Front Row		Wagner	W 77–64	13–12 (9–3)	Merkert Gymnasium (464); Easton, MA
February 22, 2025; 2:00 p.m., NEC Front Row		Central Connecticut	L 68–84	13–13 (9–4)	Merkert Gymnasium (534); Easton, MA
February 27, 2025; 6:00 p.m., NEC Front Row		at Fairleigh Dickinson	L 57–74	13–14 (9–5)	Bogota Savings Bank Center (385); Hackensack, NJ
March 1, 2025; 1:00 p.m., NEC Front Row		Le Moyne	W 65–61	14–14 (10–5)	Merkert Gymnasium (532); Easton, MA
March 6, 2025; 7:00 p.m., NEC Front Row		at Wagner	W 68–60	15–14 (11–5)	Spiro Sports Center (834); Staten Island, NY
NEC tournament
March 10, 2025; 7:00 p.m., NEC Front Row	(2)	vs. (7) Wagner; Quarterfinals	W 72–50	16–14	W.B. Mason Stadium (437); Easton, MA
March 13, 2025; 7:00 p.m., ESPN+	(2)	vs. (5) Le Moyne; Semifinals	W 60–41	17–14	Merkert Gymnasium (925); Easton, MA
March 16, 2025; 12:00 p.m., ESPNU	(2)	(1) Fairleigh Dickinson; Championship	L 49–66	17–15	Merkert Gymnasium (590); Easton, MA
WNIT
March 20, 2025; 6:00 p.m., ESPN+		at UMass; First Round	L 40–86	17–16	Mullins Center; Amherst, MA
*Non-conference game. ^{#}Rankings from AP poll. (#) Tournament seedings in parentheses. All times are in Eastern.
