= 2024–25 Saint Francis Red Flash women's basketball team =

American college basketball season

2024–25 Saint Francis Red Flash women's basketball
- Conference: Northeast Conference
- Record: 11–19 (9–7 NEC)
- Head coach: Keila Whittington (6th season)
- Assistant coaches: Chynna Bozeman; Nikolas Quezada; Alexa Middleton
- Home arena: DeGol Arena

2024–25 Northeast Conference women's basketball standings
	Conf.				Overall
Team	W		L	PCT	W		L	PCT
Fairleigh Dickinson †	16	–	0	1.000	29	–	4	.879
Stonehill*	11	–	5	.688	17	–	16	.515
Central Connecticut	10	–	6	.625	11	–	19	.367
Saint Francis	9	–	7	.563	11	–	19	.367
Le Moyne*	6	–	10	.375	7	–	24	.226
Mercyhurst*	6	–	10	.375	9	–	18	.333
Chicago State	6	–	10	.375	7	–	26	.212
Wagner	5	–	11	.313	8	–	21	.276
LIU	3	–	13	.188	6	–	24	.200
† 2025 NEC tournament winner * ineligible for the 2025 NCAA tournament due to transition from Division II

The 2024–25 Saint Francis Red Flash women's basketball team represented Saint Francis University during the 2024–25 NCAA Division I women's basketball season. The Red Flash, who were led by sixth-year head coach Keila Whittington, played their home games at the DeGol Arena in Loretto, Pennsylvania as members of the Northeast Conference.

== Previous season ==
The Red Flash finished the 2023–24 season 5–25, 4–12 in NEC play, to finish in a three-way tie for seventh place. They were defeated by top-seeded and eventual tournament champions Sacred Heart in the quarterfinals of the NEC tournament.

== Preseason ==
On October 23, 2024, the NEC released their preseason coaches poll. Saint Francis was picked to finish fifth in the NEC regular season.

=== Preseason rankings ===
NEC preseason poll
Predicted finish	Team
1	Fairleigh Dickinson
2	Central Connecticut
3	Le Moyne
4	Stonehill
5	Saint Francis
6	Wagner
7	LIU
T-8	Mercyhurst
T-8	Chicago State

=== Preseason All-NEC Team ===
No Red Flashes were named to the Preseason All-NEC team.

== Roster ==
2024–25 Saint Francis Red Flash women's basketball team
Players
Coaches

Pos.	#	Name	Height	Year	Previous school	Hometown
G	0	Yanessa Boyd	5 ft 9 in (1.75 m)	So	Riverdale Baptist School	Frederick, Maryland
G	1	Kameryn Dorsey	5 ft 6 in (1.68 m)	So	Saint Frances Academy	Baltimore, Maryland
F	3	Jade Campbell	6 ft 0 in (1.83 m)	Jr	Medgar Evers College Prep School	Brooklyn, New York
G	4	Marissa Shelton	5 ft 8 in (1.73 m)	Jr	John Adams High School	South Bend, Indiana
G	5	Natalie Johnson	5 ft 8 in (1.73 m)	Jr	Robert Morris	Waldorf, Maryland
G	10	Ineivi Plata	5 ft 3 in (1.6 m)	Fr	White Plains High School	White Plains, New York
G	11	Harris Robinson	5 ft 8 in (1.73 m)	Sr	Avonworth High School	Pittsburgh, Pennsylvania
F	12	Julianna Gibson	6 ft 2 in (1.88 m)	Jr	Colts Neck High School	Colts Neck, New Jersey
G	20	Airah Lavy	5 ft 10 in (1.78 m)	Fr	Nelsonville-York High School	Nelsonville, Ohio
G	21	Gemma Walker	5 ft 10 in (1.78 m)	Fr	Peters Township High School	Venetia, Pennsylvania
F	23	Marina Artero	5 ft 11 in (1.8 m)	So	FC Barcelona	Fontanilles, Spain
G	24	Destini Ward	5 ft 8 in (1.73 m)	Jr	Western Tech	Baltimore, Maryland
F	32	Fanta Daffe	5 ft 10 in (1.78 m)	Sr	Odessa College	Paris, France
F	33	Giselle Eke	6 ft 3 in (1.91 m)	Fr	Bishop Dwenger High School	Fort Wayne, Indiana
F	34	Alary Bell	6 ft 2 in (1.88 m)	So	Miller School of Albemarle	Chester, Virginia

Head coach

- Keila Whittington (Dillard)

Assistant coach(es)

- Chynna Bozeman (Morehead State)
- Nikolas Quezada (Miami (OH))
- Alexa Middleton (Monmouth)

Legend

- (C) Team captain
- (S) Suspended
- (I) Ineligible
- (W) Walk-on
- Injured
- Current redshirt

Roster
Last update: April 26, 2025

== Schedule and results ==
Date time, TV	Rank^{#}	Opponent^{#}	Result	Record	Site (attendance) city, state
Non-conference regular season
November 4, 2024*; 7:00 pm, NEC Front Row		NJIT	L 60–80	0–1	DeGol Arena (514); Loretto, PA
November 9, 2024*; 2:00 pm, ESPN+		at Lafayette	L 45–53	0–2	Kirby Sports Center (246); Easton, PA
November 12, 2024*; 11:00 am, ESPN+		at Coppin State	L 38–74	0–3	Physical Education Complex (3,247); Baltimore, MD
November 15, 2024*; 11:00 am, NEC Front Row		Canisius	L 46–48	0–4	DeGol Arena (1,418); Loretto, PA
November 17, 2024*; 2:00 pm, NEC Front Row		Loyola (MD)	L 52–65	0–5	DeGol Arena (420); Loretto, PA
November 20, 2024*; 7:00 pm, ESPN+		at Robert Morris	W 58–55	1–5	UPMC Events Center (203); Moon Township, PA
November 24, 2024*; 1:00 pm, B1G+		at No. 11 Maryland	L 35–107	1–6	Xfinity Center (5,773); College Park, MD
November 27, 2024*; 3:00 pm, ESPN+		at Saint Joseph's	L 35–88	1–7	Hagan Arena (650); Philadelphia, PA
December 1, 2024*; 2:00 pm, ESPN+		at Duquesne	L 71–85	1–8	UPMC Cooper Fieldhouse (688); Pittsburgh, PA
December 5, 2024*; 11:00 am, ESPN+		at Delaware State	W 69–60	2–8	Memorial Hall (315); Dover, DE
December 8, 2024*; 2:00 pm, NEC Front Row		UMBC	L 45–61	2–9	DeGol Arena (405); Loretto, PA
December 15, 2024*; 1:00 pm, FloHoops		at Butler	L 38–95	2–10	Hinkle Fieldhouse (943); Indianapolis, IN
December 20, 2024*; 11:00 am, ESPN+		at Rhode Island	L 37–77	2–11	Ryan Center (5,922); Kingston, RI
NEC regular season
January 2, 2025; 4:00 pm, NEC Front Row		at Central Connecticut	W 79–63	3–11 (1–0)	William H. Detrick Gymnasium (212); New Britain, CT
January 4, 2025; 2:00 pm, NEC Front Row		at Stonehill	L 59–73	3–12 (1–1)	Merkert Gymnasium (219); Easton, MA
January 9, 2025; 7:00 pm, NEC Front Row		Fairleigh Dickinson	L 55–63	3–13 (1–2)	DeGol Arena (156); Loretto, PA
January 11, 2025; 4:00 pm, NEC Front Row		Le Moyne	W 73–41	4–13 (2–2)	DeGol Arena (394); Loretto, PA
January 18, 2025; 4:00 pm, NEC Front Row		LIU	W 63–54	5–13 (3–2)	DeGol Arena (451); Loretto, PA
January 20, 2025; 7:00 pm, ESPN+		Wagner	W 51–47	6–13 (4–2)	DeGol Arena (401); Loretto, PA
January 23, 2025; 7:00 pm, NEC Front Row		at LIU	L 56–63	6–14 (4–3)	Steinberg Wellness Center (188); Brooklyn, NY
January 25, 2025; 4:00 pm, NEC Front Row		at Wagner	W 50–48	7–14 (5–3)	Spiro Sports Center (200); Staten Island, NY
February 6, 2025; 6:00 pm, NEC Front Row		at Le Moyne	W 66–60 ^{OT}	8–14 (6–3)	Ted Grant Court (266); DeWitt, NY
February 8, 2025; 4:00 pm, NEC Front Row		Chicago State	W 63–58	9–14 (7–3)	DeGol Arena (446); Loretto, PA
February 13, 2025; 7:00 pm, NEC Front Row		Stonehill	L 43–74	9–15 (7–4)	DeGol Arena (502); Loretto, PA
February 15, 2025; 4:00 pm, NEC Front Row		Central Connecticut	L 67–70 ^{OT}	9–16 (7–5)	DeGol Arena (496); Loretto, PA
February 20, 2025; 7:00 pm, NEC Front Row		Mercyhurst	W 70–69	10–16 (8–5)	DeGol Arena (495); Loretto, PA
February 22, 2025; 2:00 pm, NEC Front Row		at Fairleigh Dickinson	L 33–60	10–17 (8–6)	Bogota Savings Bank Center (250); Hackensack, NJ
March 1, 2025; 2:00 pm, NEC Front Row		at Chicago State	L 55–58 ^{OT}	10–18 (8–7)	Jones Convocation Center (330); Chicago, IL
March 6, 2025; 6:00 pm, NEC Front Row		at Mercyhurst	W 80–65	11–18 (9–7)	Owen McCormick Court (241); Erie, PA
NEC tournament
March 10, 2025; 7:00 pm, NEC Front Row	(4)	(5) Le Moyne; Quarterfinals	L 51–62	11–19	DeGol Arena (585); Loretto, PA
*Non-conference game. ^{#}Rankings from AP Poll. (#) Tournament seedings in parentheses. All times are in Eastern.
