= 2024–25 Fairleigh Dickinson Knights women's basketball team =

American college basketball season

2024–25 Fairleigh Dickinson Knights women's basketball
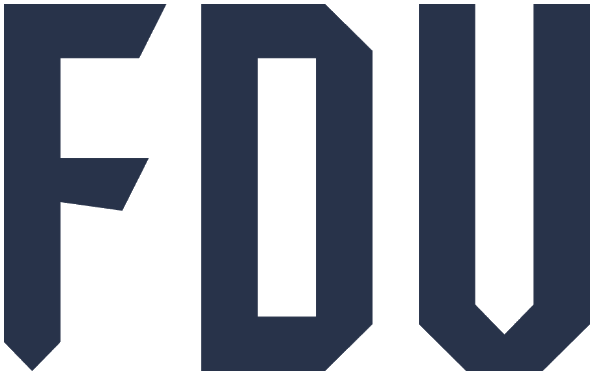

NEC regular season champions NEC tournament champions

NCAA tournament, First Round
- Conference: Northeast Conference
- Record: 29–4 (16–0 NEC)
- Head coach: Stephanie Gaitley (2nd season)
- Associate head coach: Jessica Simmonds
- Assistant coaches: Jeremy Thompson; Madison Stanley; Ty Rozier
- Home arena: Bogota Savings Bank Center

2024–25 Northeast Conference women's basketball standings
	Conf.				Overall
Team	W		L	PCT	W		L	PCT
Fairleigh Dickinson †	16	–	0	1.000	29	–	4	.879
Stonehill*	11	–	5	.688	17	–	16	.515
Central Connecticut	10	–	6	.625	11	–	19	.367
Saint Francis	9	–	7	.563	11	–	19	.367
Le Moyne*	6	–	10	.375	7	–	24	.226
Mercyhurst*	6	–	10	.375	9	–	18	.333
Chicago State	6	–	10	.375	7	–	26	.212
Wagner	5	–	11	.313	8	–	21	.276
LIU	3	–	13	.188	6	–	24	.200
† 2025 NEC tournament winner * ineligible for the 2025 NCAA tournament due to transition from Division II

The 2024–25 Fairleigh Dickinson Knights women's basketball team represented Fairleigh Dickinson University during the 2024–25 NCAA Division I women's basketball season. The Knights, led by second-year head coach Stephanie Gaitley, played their home games in Hackensack, New Jersey at the Bogota Savings Bank Center as members of the Northeast Conference (NEC).

== Previous season ==
The Knights finished the 2023–24 season 14–17, 11–5 in NEC play, to finish in third place. In the NEC tournament, they defeated LIU in the quarterfinals before losing to Le Moyne in the semifinals.

== Roster ==
2024–25 Fairleigh Dickinson Knights women's basketball team
Players
Coaches

Pos.	#	Name	Height	Year	Previous school	Hometown
G	1	Staci Williams	5 ft 8 in (1.73 m)	So	Holly Springs HS	Holly Springs, NC
F	3	Bella Toomey	5 ft 11 in (1.8 m)	So	Penn Charter School	Philadelphia, PA
G	4	Ava Reeninger	5 ft 6 in (1.68 m)	Fr	Archbishop Wood HS	Yardley, PA
G	5	Talia Baptiste	5 ft 6 in (1.68 m)	Fr	Columbia HS	Maplewood, NJ
G	10	Dominique García Blackwood	5 ft 10 in (1.78 m)	Jr	IES Los Tarahale	Las Palmas, Spain
G	11	Abby Conklin	5 ft 7 in (1.7 m)	GS	Irvington HS	Irvington, NY
F	12	Sydney Stokes	6 ft 0 in (1.83 m)	Fr	Mainland Regional HS	Irvington, NY
G	13	Abaigeal Babore	5 ft 6 in (1.68 m)	GS	Eckerd College	Merchantville, NJ
F	14	Joi Johnson	5 ft 7 in (1.7 m)	Fr	Ewing	Ewing, NJ
F/C	20	Teneisia Brown	6 ft 2 in (1.88 m)	GS	Merrimack	Montego Bay, Jamaica
G	21	Rebecca Osei-Owusu	5 ft 11 in (1.8 m)	So	Monsignor Scanlan HS	Brooklyn, NY
G	22	Jada Elston	5 ft 7 in (1.7 m)	So	Middle Township HS	Woodbine, NJ
F	23	Tyler Edwards	5 ft 7 in (1.7 m)	Fr	Sanford School	Townsend, DE
G	24	Kaliee McDonald	5 ft 9 in (1.75 m)	Fr	Worcester Academy	Lowell, MA
G	33	Allie McGinn	5 ft 11 in (1.8 m)	Sr	Staten Island Academy	Staten Island, NY
F	45	Lilly Parke	6 ft 2 in (1.88 m)	Jr	Auburn Montgomery	Auckland, New Zealand

Head coach

- Stephanie Gaitley (Villanova)

Assistant coach(es)

- Jessica Simmonds (George Washington)
- Jeremy Thompson (Muhlenberg)
- Ty Rozier (Fordham)
- Nickie Carter (Fairleigh Dickinson)

Legend

- (C) Team captain
- (S) Suspended
- (I) Ineligible
- (W) Walk-on
- Injured
- Current redshirt

Roster

== Schedule and results ==
Date time, TV	Rank^{#}	Opponent^{#}	Result	Record	Site (attendance) city, state
Exhibition
October 25, 2024*; 7:00 p.m.		Bloomsburg	W 59–51		Bogota Savings Bank Center (152); Hackensack, NJ
Non-conference regular season
November 4, 2024*; 7:00 p.m., NEC Front Row		Dominican (NY)	W 79–57	1–0	Bogota Savings Bank Center (162); Hackensack, NJ
November 8, 2024*; 12:00 p.m., ESPN+		at American	W 62–59	2–0	Bender Arena (417); Washington, D.C.
November 10, 2024*; 3:00 p.m., ESPN+		at Mount St. Mary's	W 63–59	3–0	Knott Arena (601); Emmitsburg, MD
November 13, 2024*; 7:00 p.m., NEC Front Row		Bucknell	W 67–56	4–0	Bogota Savings Bank Center (287); Hackensack, NJ
November 17, 2024*; 2:00 p.m., ACCNX/ESPN+		at Syracuse	W 67–56	4–1	JMA Wireless Dome (2,259); Syracuse, NY
November 20, 2024*; 7:00 p.m., SNY		at No. 2 UConn	L 41–85	4–2	Harry A. Gampel Pavilion (10,299); Storrs, CT
November 23, 2024*; 12:00 p.m., YES		Saint Peter's	W 67–50	5–2	Bogota Savings Bank Center (185); Hackensack, NJ
December 4, 2024*; 6:00 p.m., ESPN+		at Lafayette	W 69–62	6–2	Kirby Sports Center (246); Easton, PA
December 8, 2024*; 2:00 p.m., ESPN+		at Rider	W 62–54	7–2	Alumni Gymnasium (684); Lawrenceville, NJ
December 11, 2024*; 7:00 p.m., B1G+		at Rutgers	L 58–83	7–3	Jersey Mike's Arena (1,681); Piscataway, NJ
December 19, 2024*; 1:00 p.m., NEC Front Row		Saint Michael's	W 91–52	8–3	Bogota Savings Bank Center (185); Hackensack, NJ
December 28, 2024*; 4:00 p.m., NEC Front Row		Maine; FDU Christmas Classic	W 66–48	9–3	Bogota Savings Bank Center (377); Hackensack, NJ
December 29, 2024*; 3:30 p.m., NEC Front Row		Bryant; FDU Christmas Classic	W 63–49	10–3	Bogota Savings Bank Center (300); Hackensack, NJ
NEC regular season
January 4, 2025; 2:00 p.m., NEC Front Row		Wagner	W 75–49	11–3 (1–0)	Bogota Savings Bank Center (279); Hackensack, NJ
January 9, 2025; 7:00 p.m., NEC Front Row		at Saint Francis	W 63–55	12–3 (2–0)	DeGol Arena (156); Loretto, PA
January 11, 2025; 1:00 p.m., NEC Front Row		at Mercyhurst	W 77–63	13–3 (3–0)	Owen McCormick Court (236); Erie, PA
January 18, 2025; 1:00 p.m., YES		Central Connecticut	W 75–58	14–3 (4–0)	Bogota Savings Bank Center (309); Hackensack, NJ
January 20, 2025; 2:00 p.m., NEC Front Row		Chicago State	W 49–43	15–3 (5–0)	Bogota Savings Bank Center (309); Hackensack, NJ
January 23, 2025; 2:00 p.m., NEC Front Row		at Stonehill	W 72–54	16–3 (6–0)	Merkert Gymnasium (242); Easton, MA
February 1, 2025; 1:00 p.m., NEC Front Row		Mercyhurst	W 75–45	17–3 (7–0)	Bogota Savings Bank Center (500); Hackensack, NJ
February 6, 2025; 4:00 p.m., ESPN+		at Central Connecticut	W 61–52	18–3 (8–0)	William H. Detrick Gymnasium (231); New Britain, CT
February 8, 2025; 4:00 p.m., NEC Front Row		at Wagner	W 61–52	19–3 (9–0)	Spiro Sports Center (300); Staten Island, NY
February 13, 2025; 6:00 p.m., NEC Front Row		at Chicago State	W 74–70	20–3 (10–0)	Jones Convocation Center (112); Chicago, IL
February 15, 2025; 1:00 p.m., NEC Front Row		LIU	W 75–45	21–3 (11–0)	Bogota Savings Bank Center (239); Hackensack, NJ
February 20, 2025; 7:00 p.m., ESPNU		Le Moyne	W 65–46	22–3 (12–0)	Bogota Savings Bank Center (900); Hackensack, NJ
February 22, 2025; 2:00 p.m., NEC Front Row		Saint Francis (PA)	W 60–33	23–3 (13–0)	Bogota Savings Bank Center (250); Hackensack, NJ
February 27, 2025; 11:30 a.m., NEC Front Row		Stonehill	W 74–57	24–3 (14–0)	Bogota Savings Bank Center (385); Hackensack, NJ
March 1, 2025; 2:00 p.m., NEC Front Row		at LIU	W 73–46	25–3 (15–0)	Steinberg Wellness Center (123); Brooklyn, NY
March 6, 2025; 6:00 p.m., NEC Front Row		at Le Moyne	W 64–48	26–3 (16–0)	Ted Grant Court (364); DeWitt, NY
NEC tournament
March 13, 2025; 7:00 p.m., NEC Front Row	(1)	(8) LIU; Quarterfinals	W 73–44	27–3	Bogota Savings Bank Center (309); Hackensack, NJ
March 15, 2025; 7:00 p.m., ESPN+	(1)	(6) Chicago State; Semifinals	W 90–61	28–3	Bogota Savings Bank Center (1,342); Hackensack, NJ
March 16, 2025; 12:00 p.m., ESPNU	(1)	(2) Stonehill; Championship Game	W 66–49	29–3	Bogota Savings Bank Center; Hackensack, NJ
NCAA tournament
March 21, 2025*; 3:30 p.m., ESPN2	(15 B3)	at (2 B3) No. 6 TCU; First round	L 51–73	29–4	Schollmaier Arena; Fort Worth, TX
*Non-conference game. ^{#}Rankings from AP poll. (#) Tournament seedings in parentheses. All times are in Eastern.
