= 2024–25 Central Connecticut Blue Devils women's basketball team =

American college basketball season

2024–25 Central Connecticut Blue Devils women's basketball
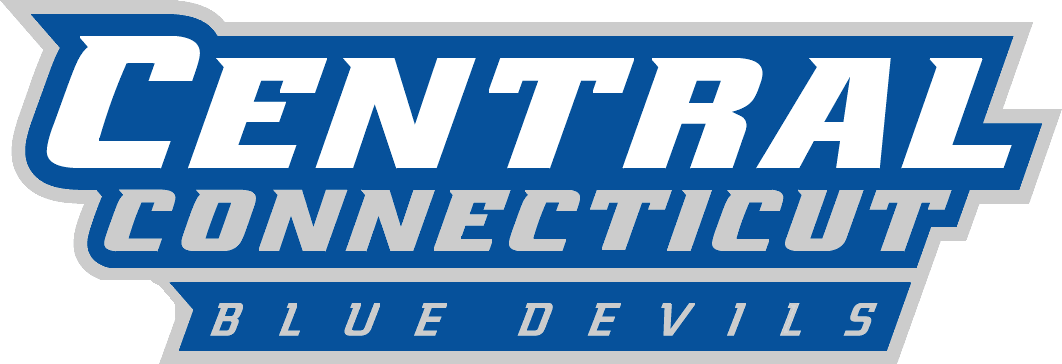
- Conference: Northeast Conference
- Record: 11–19 (10–6 NEC)
- Head coach: Way Veney (2nd season)
- Assistant coaches: Danielle Spiliotis (2nd season); Erica Covile (2nd season)
- Home arena: William H. Detrick Gymnasium

2024–25 Northeast Conference women's basketball standings
	Conf.				Overall
Team	W		L	PCT	W		L	PCT
Fairleigh Dickinson †	16	–	0	1.000	29	–	4	.879
Stonehill*	11	–	5	.688	17	–	16	.515
Central Connecticut	10	–	6	.625	11	–	19	.367
Saint Francis	9	–	7	.563	11	–	19	.367
Le Moyne*	6	–	10	.375	7	–	24	.226
Mercyhurst*	6	–	10	.375	9	–	18	.333
Chicago State	6	–	10	.375	7	–	26	.212
Wagner	5	–	11	.313	8	–	21	.276
LIU	3	–	13	.188	6	–	24	.200
† 2025 NEC tournament winner * ineligible for the 2025 NCAA tournament due to transition from Division II

The 2024–25 Central Connecticut Blue Devils women's basketball team represented Central Connecticut State University during the 2024–25 NCAA Division I women's basketball season. The Blue Devils, led by second-year head coach Way Veney, played their home games at the William H. Detrick Gymnasium in New Britain, Connecticut, as members of the Northeast Conference (NEC).

Veney resigned at the end of the season with an overall record of 20–40 in two years.

== Previous season ==
The Blue Devils finished the 2023–24 season 9–21, 7–9 in NEC play, to finish in fifth place in the conference. They were defeated by Merrimack in the quarterfinals of the NEC tournament.

== Preseason ==
On October 23, 2024, the NEC released the preseason coaches poll. Central Connecticut was picked to finish second in the conference.

=== Preseason rankings ===
NEC preseason poll
Predicted finish	Team
1	Fairleigh Dickinson
2	Central Connecticut
3	Le Moyne
4	Stonehill
5	Saint Francis
6	Wagner
7	LIU
T–8	Mercyhurst
T–8	Chicago State

=== Preseason All-NEC ===
Senior guard Belle Lanpher was named to the Preseason All-NEC Team for the second season in a row, the only returning honoree.

== Roster ==
2024–25 Central Connecticut Blue Devils women's basketball team
Players
Coaches

Pos.	#	Name	Height	Year	Previous school	Hometown
F	0	Constance Ogbeide	6 ft 0 in (1.83 m)	So	Forca Lleida; Siena	Lleida, Spain
G	1	Ilektra Lykaki	5 ft 9 in (1.75 m)	Fr	2nd Senior High School of Kavala	Kavala, Greece
G	2	Belle Lanpher	5 ft 5 in (1.65 m)	GS	Wachusett Regional	Princeton, MA
F	3	Selina Monestime	5 ft 10 in (1.78 m)	RS Fr	Framingham; UAlbany	Marlborough, MA
G	5	Amaya Williams	5 ft 5 in (1.65 m)	Sr	Nottingham	Syracuse, NY
F	11	Kayla Henry	6 ft 0 in (1.83 m)	So	East Hartford	East Hartford, CT
F	12	Lucia Noin	6 ft 0 in (1.83 m)	Jr	Colegio San Agustin; Raritan Valley CC	Santander, Spain
G	13	Dagny Slomack	5 ft 6 in (1.68 m)	Fr	Newark Academy	South Orange, NJ
G	14	Jessica Farrell	5 ft 7 in (1.7 m)	Fr	Millbrook School	Bethlehem, PA
G	21	Cierra Pearson	5 ft 8 in (1.73 m)	Jr	Saddle River Day School	Teaneck, NJ
F	22	Alonna Sellers	6 ft 1 in (1.85 m)	Jr	Hampton; UNC Asheville	Hampton, VA
G	24	Kaya Weiskopf	5 ft 10 in (1.78 m)	RS Fr	St. Luke's School	Ridgefield, CT
F	32	Meghan Kenefick	6 ft 0 in (1.83 m)	GS	Neuse Christian Academy; Paul VI Catholic	Oakton, VA

Head coach

- Way Veney (East Carolina)

Assistant coach(es)

- Danielle Spiliotis (Cedarville)
- Khyreed Carter (Temple)

Legend

- (C) Team captain
- (S) Suspended
- (I) Ineligible
- (W) Walk-on
- Injured
- Current redshirt

Roster
Last update: January 8, 2025

== Schedule and results ==
Date time, TV	Rank^{#}	Opponent^{#}	Result	Record	High points	High rebounds	High assists	Site (attendance) city, state
Non-conference regular season
November 4, 2024*; 7:00 p.m., B1G+		at Minnesota	L 48–89	0–1	11 – Slomack	8 – Sellers	3 – Slomack	Williams Arena (2,647); Minneapolis, MN
November 7, 2024*; 7:00 p.m., NEC Front Row		Manhattan	L 64–78	0–2	18 – Monestime	10 – Kenefick	4 – Kenefick	William H. Detrick Gymnasium (2,094); New Britain, CT
November 10, 2024*; 1:00 p.m., ESPN+		at UMass	L 60–66	0–3	17 – Kenefick	12 – Sellers	5 – Williams	Mullins Center (1,054); Amherst, MA
November 12, 2024*; 7:00 p.m., NEC Front Row		Bryant	L 48–59	0–4	14 – Kenefick	10 – Farrell	4 – Farrell	William H. Detrick Gymnasium (502); New Britain, CT
November 15, 2024*; 6:00 p.m., ESPN+		at Colgate	L 60–74	0–5	15 – Williams	9 – Sellers	2 – tied	Cotterell Court (256); Hamilton, NY
November 20, 2024*; 7:00 p.m., ESPN+		at Fairfield	L 54–82	0–6	15 – Monestime	5 – tied	3 – tied	Leo D. Mahoney Arena (624); Fairfield, CT
November 26, 2024*; 4:00 p.m., NEC Front Row		Siena	L 50–87	0–7	15 – Monestime	9 – Henry	3 – Kenefick	William H. Detrick Gymnasium (208); New Britain, CT
November 29, 2024*; 12:00 p.m., NEC Front Row		Bridgeport	W 66–25	1–7	20 – Noin	12 – Monestime	4 – Williams	William H. Detrick Gymnasium (207); New Britain, CT
December 1, 2024*; 1:00 p.m., ESPN+		at Dayton	L 38–65	1–8	8 – Kenefick	6 – Noin	1 – tied	UD Arena (1,538); Dayton, OH
December 3, 2024*; 11:00 a.m., ESPN+		at Cincinnati	L 49–78	1–9	15 – Kenefick	6 – Kenefick	3 – Noin	Fifth Third Arena (3,235); Cincinnati, OH
December 7, 2024*; 1:00 p.m., NEC Front Row		Morgan State	L 48–53	1–10	13 – Lanpher	10 – Monestime	3 – Monestime	William H. Detrick Gymnasium (212); New Britain, CT
December 16, 2024*; 11:00 a.m., NEC Front Row		Dartmouth	L 59–61	1–11	27 – Lanpher	13 – Sellers	4 – Lanpher	William H. Detrick Gymnasium (204); New Britain, CT
December 20, 2024*; 12:00 p.m., ACCNX		at Boston College	L 56–83	1–12	22 – Lanpher	10 – Monestime	4 – tied	Conte Forum (312); Chestnut Hill, MA
NEC regular season
January 2, 2025; 4:00 p.m., NEC Front Row		Saint Francis	L 63–79	1–13 (0–1)	17 – Williams	10 – Sellers	5 – Lanpher	William H. Detrick Gymnasium (212); New Britain, CT
January 4, 2025; 1:00 p.m., NEC Front Row		Mercyhurst	W 78–52	2–13 (0–2)	19 – Noin	9 – Noin	5 – Lanpher	William H. Detrick Gymnasium (279); New Britain, CT
January 9, 2025; 7:00 p.m., NEC Front Row		LIU	W 52–48	3–13 (1–2)	25 – Lanpher	11 – Lanpher	3 – Williams	William H. Detrick Gymnasium (211); New Britain, CT
January 11, 2025; 4:00 p.m., NEC Front Row		at Wagner	W 62–55	4–13 (2–2)	37 – Lanpher	14 – Kenefick	6 – Kenefick	Spiro Sports Center; Staten Island, NY
January 18, 2025; 1:00 p.m., NEC Front Row/YES Network		at Fairleigh Dickinson	L 58–75	4–14 (3–2)	31 – Lanpher	9 – Henry	3 – Williams	Bogota Savings Bank Center (309); Hackensack, NJ
January 23, 2025; 7:00 p.m., NEC Front Row		at Chicago State	L 77–84	4–15 (3–3)	29 – Lanpher	12 – Kenefick	6 – Lanpher	Emil and Patricia Jones Convocation Center (97); Chicago, IL
January 25, 2025; 1:00 p.m., NEC Front Row		Le Moyne	W 67–50	5–15 (4–3)	20 – Lanpher	6 – tied	4 – Kenefick	William H. Detrick Gymnasium (449); New Britain, CT
February 1, 2025; 1:00 p.m., NEC Front Row		Stonehill	W 71–59	6–15 (5–3)	26 – Lanpher	6 – Monestime	4 – Williams	William H. Detrick Gymnasium (324); New Britain, CT
February 6, 2025; 4:00 p.m., ESPN+		Fairleigh Dickinson	L 52–61	6–16 (5–4)	14 – Lanpher	8 – Lanpher	5 – Lanpher	William H. Detrick Gymnasium (231); New Britain, CT
February 13, 2025; 6:00 p.m., NEC Front Row		at Mercyhurst	L 74–76	6–17 (5–5)	18 – tied	8 – Kenefick	3 – tied	Mercyhurst Athletic Center (369); Erie, PA
February 15, 2025; 4:00 p.m., NEC Front Row		at Saint Francis	W 70–67	7–17 (6–5)	26 – Lanpher	10 – Noin	4 – Lanpher	DeGol Arena (496); Loretto, PA
February 20, 2025; 7:00 p.m., NEC Front Row		Chicago State	W 62–61	8–17 (7–5)	19 – Lanpher	11 – Noin	8 – Lanpher	William H. Detrick Gymnasium (302); New Britain, CT
February 22, 2025; 2:00 p.m., NEC Front Row		at Stonehill	W 84–68	9–17 (8–5)	35 – Lanpher	8 – Monestime	6 – Kenefick	Merkert Gymnasium (534); Easton, MA
February 27, 2025; 6:00 p.m., NEC Front Row		at Le Moyne	L 64–75	9–18 (8–6)	24 – Lanpher	6 – tied	4 – Noin	Ted Grant Court (275); Syracuse, NY
March 1, 2025; 1:00 p.m., NEC Front Row		Wagner	W 76–65	10–18 (9–6)	17 – Lanpher	10 – Noin	6 – Lanpher	William H. Detrick Gymnasium (311); New Britain, CT
March 6, 2025; 7:00 p.m., NEC Front Row		at LIU	W 68–63	11–18 (10–6)	24 – Lampher	7 – Lanpher	3 – Lanpher	Steinberg Wellness Center (123); Brooklyn, NY
NEC tournament
March 10, 2025; 7:00 p.m., NEC Front Row	(3)	(6) Chicago State; Quarterfinals	L 60–70	11–19	16 – Slomack	9 – Pearson	5 – Pearson	William H. Detrick Gymnasium (602); New Britain, CT
*Non-conference game. ^{#}Rankings from AP poll. (#) Tournament seedings in parentheses. All times are in Eastern.
