= 2024–25 Mercyhurst Lakers women's basketball team =

American college basketball season

2024–25 Mercyhurst Lakers women's basketball
- Conference: Northeast Conference
- Record: 9–18 (6–10 NEC)
- Head coach: Brooklyn Kohlheim (6th season)
- Assistant coaches: Rahmon Fletcher; Molly Glick; Andrew Monti; Ali Gorrell
- Home arena: Owen McCormick Court

2024–25 Northeast Conference women's basketball standings
	Conf.				Overall
Team	W		L	PCT	W		L	PCT
Fairleigh Dickinson †	16	–	0	1.000	29	–	4	.879
Stonehill*	11	–	5	.688	17	–	16	.515
Central Connecticut	10	–	6	.625	11	–	19	.367
Saint Francis	9	–	7	.563	11	–	19	.367
Le Moyne*	6	–	10	.375	7	–	24	.226
Mercyhurst*	6	–	10	.375	9	–	18	.333
Chicago State	6	–	10	.375	7	–	26	.212
Wagner	5	–	11	.313	8	–	21	.276
LIU	3	–	13	.188	6	–	24	.200
† 2025 NEC tournament winner * ineligible for the 2025 NCAA tournament due to transition from Division II

The 2024–25 Mercyhurst Lakers women's basketball team represented Mercyhurst University during the 2024–25 NCAA Division I women's basketball season. The Lakers, who were led by sixth-year head coach Brooklyn Kohlheim, played their home games on Owen McCormick Court in the Mercyhurst Athletic Center in Erie, Pennsylvania as first-year members of the Northeast Conference (NEC).

The Lakers finished the season 9–18, 6–10 in NEC play, to finish in a three-way tie for fifth place.

This season marked Mercyhurst's first year of a four-year transition period from Division II to Division I. As a result, the Lakers are not eligible to participate in the NCAA tournament until the 2028–29 season.

== Previous season ==
The Lakers finished the 2023–24 season 18–11, 14–8 in Pennsylvania State Athletic Conference (PSAC) play, to finish in fifth place in the West division. They were defeated by Edinboro in the first round of the PSAC tournament.

== Preseason ==
On October 23, 2024, the NEC released their preseason coaches poll. Mercyhurst was picked to finish tied for last place in the NEC regular season.

=== Preseason rankings ===
NEC preseason poll
Predicted finish	Team
1	Fairleigh Dickinson
2	Central Connecticut
3	Le Moyne
4	Stonehill
5	Saint Francis
6	Wagner
7	LIU
T–8	Mercyhurst
T–8	Chicago State

=== Preseason All-NEC Team ===
No Lakers were named to the Preseason All-NEC team.

== Roster ==
2024–25 Mercyhurst Lakers women's basketball team
Players
Coaches

Pos.	#	Name	Height	Year	Previous school	Hometown
G	0	Sophia Kelly	5 ft 9 in (1.75 m)	So	Hampton High School	Pittsburgh, PA
G	1	Singo Lekeuneu	5 ft 5 in (1.65 m)	Sr	Duquesne	Buffalo, NY
G	3	Allyson Ross	5 ft 5 in (1.65 m)	Sr	Winthrop	Columbia Station, OH
G	5	Jenna Van Schaik	5 ft 7 in (1.7 m)	Jr	Ursuline Academy	Cincinnati, OH
G	10	Cici Hernandez	5 ft 6 in (1.68 m)	Fr	Bethlehem Catholic High School	Bethlehem, PA
G	11	Alena Fusetti	5 ft 9 in (1.75 m)	Fr	Blackhawk High School	Beaver Falls, PA
G	13	Maria McConnell	5 ft 11 in (1.8 m)	Sr	Saint Francis	Nanty Glo, PA
G	15	Ava Waid	5 ft 6 in (1.68 m)	Sr	Villa Maria Academy	Meadville, PA
G	20	Grace Strickland	5 ft 9 in (1.75 m)	Fr	Bella Vista Prep	London, England
G	22	Grace Clary	5 ft 10 in (1.78 m)	GS	Merrimack	Whitehall, PA
F	23	Lauryn Stover	5 ft 11 in (1.8 m)	Jr	Purdue Fort Wayne	Gates Mills, OH
G	24	Quinn Borroni	5 ft 9 in (1.75 m)	Fr	Blackhawk High School	Beaver Falls, PA
F	32	Erica Hall	5 ft 11 in (1.8 m)	Fr	South Fayette High School	McDonald, PA
G	33	Ella Cupka	5 ft 9 in (1.75 m)	Fr	Chartiers Valley High School	Pittsburgh, PA
F	34	Bailey Kuhns	5 ft 11 in (1.8 m)	Jr	Greensburg Central Catholic High School	Mount Pleasant, PA

Head coach

- Brooklyn Kohlheim (Florida Southern)

Assistant coach(es)

- Rahmon Fletcher (Green Bay)
- Molly Glick (Northern Kentucky)
- Andrew Monti (Memphis)
- Ali Gorrell (Northumbria)

Legend

- (C) Team captain
- (S) Suspended
- (I) Ineligible
- (W) Walk-on
- Injured
- Current redshirt

Roster
Last update: April 29, 2025

== Schedule and results ==
Date time, TV	Rank^{#}	Opponent^{#}	Result	Record	Site (attendance) city, state
Non-conference regular season
November 4, 2024*; 5:00 p.m., ACCNX		at No. 6 Notre Dame	L 61–105	0–1	Purcell Pavilion (7,183); Notre Dame, IN
November 6, 2024*; 12:00 p.m., FloHoops		at DePaul	L 53–74	0–2	Wintrust Arena (5,057); Chicago, IL
November 12, 2024*; 6:00 p.m., NEC Front Row		Davis & Elkins	W 67–51	1–2	Owen McCormick Court (507); Erie, PA
November 15, 2024*; 7:00 p.m., FloHoops		at Xavier	L 53–68	1–3	Cintas Center (604); Cincinnati, OH
November 19, 2024*; 11:00 a.m., ESPN+		at Youngstown State	L 56–64	1–4	Beeghly Center (3,539); Youngstown, OH
November 24, 2024*; 1:00 p.m., NEC Front Row		Bryant & Stratton	W 109–43	2–4	Owen McCormick Court (350); Erie, PA
November 27, 2024*; 1:00 p.m., ESPN+		at Cornell	L 63–64 ^{OT}	2–5	Newman Arena (266); Ithaca, NY
December 3, 2024*; 12:00 p.m., NEC Front Row		Army	Canceled		Owen McCormick Court; Erie, PA
December 6, 2024*; 7:00 p.m., ESPN+		at Toledo	L 66–70	2–6	Savage Arena (3,814); Toledo, OH
December 14, 2024*; 2:00 p.m., ESPN+		at Robert Morris	L 49–69	2–7	UPMC Events Center (220); Moon Township, PA
December 16, 2024*; 6:00 p.m., NEC Front Row		Mount St. Mary's	L 83–88 ^{OT}	2–8	Owen McCormick Court (189); Erie, PA
December 30, 2024*; 6:00 p.m., NEC Front Row		Allegheny	W 71–52	3–8	Owen McCormick Court (285); Erie, PA
NEC regular season
January 2, 2025; 7:00 p.m., NEC Front Row		at Stonehill	L 54–72	3–9 (0–1)	Merkert Gymnasium (223); Easton, MA
January 4, 2025; 1:00 p.m., NEC Front Row		at Central Connecticut	L 52–78	3–10 (0–2)	William H. Detrick Gymnasium (279); New Britain, CT
January 9, 2025; 6:00 p.m., NEC Front Row		Le Moyne	W 63–52	4–10 (1–2)	Owen McCormick Court (178); Erie, PA
January 11, 2025; 1:00 p.m., NEC Front Row		Fairleigh Dickinson	L 63–77	4–11 (1–3)	Owen McCormick Court (236); Erie, PA
January 18, 2025; 1:00 p.m., NEC Front Row		Wagner	L 63–71	4–12 (1–4)	Owen McCormick Court (234); Erie, PA
January 20, 2025; 1:00 p.m., NEC Front Row		LIU	W 78–51	5–12 (2–4)	Owen McCormick Court (309); Erie, PA
January 23, 2025; 7:00 p.m., NEC Front Row		at Wagner	W 63–57	6–12 (3–4)	Spiro Sports Center (187); Staten Island, NY
January 25, 2025; 2:00 p.m., NEC Front Row		at LIU	W 73–58	7–12 (4–4)	Steinberg Wellness Center (118); Brooklyn, NY
February 1, 2025; 1:00 p.m., NEC Front Row		at Fairleigh Dickinson	L 45–75	7–13 (4–5)	Bogota Savings Bank Center (500); Hackensack, NJ
February 6, 2025; 6:00 p.m., NEC Front Row		Chicago State	W 76–69 ^{OT}	8–13 (5–5)	Owen McCormick Court (410); Erie, PA
February 8, 2025; 1:00 p.m., NEC Front Row		at Le Moyne	L 58–60	8–13 (5–6)	Ted Grant Court (368); DeWitt, NY
February 13, 2025; 6:00 p.m., NEC Front Row		Central Connecticut	W 76–74	9–14 (6–6)	Owen McCormick Court (369); Erie, PA
February 15, 2025; 1:00 p.m., ESPN+		Stonehill	L 62–69	9–15 (6–7)	Owen McCormick Court (490); Erie, PA
February 20, 2025; 7:00 p.m., NEC Front Row		at Saint Francis	L 69–70	9–16 (6–8)	DeGol Arena (495); Loretto, PA
February 27, 2025; 7:00 p.m., NEC Front Row		at Chicago State	L 63–77	9–17 (6–9)	Jones Convocation Center (245); Chicago, IL
March 6, 2025; 6:00 p.m., NEC Front Row		Saint Francis	L 65–80	9–18 (6–10)	Owen McCormick Court (241); Erie, PA
*Non-conference game. ^{#}Rankings from AP poll. (#) Tournament seedings in parentheses. All times are in Eastern.
