= 2024–25 Chicago State Cougars women's basketball team =

American college basketball season

2024–25 Chicago State Cougars women's basketball
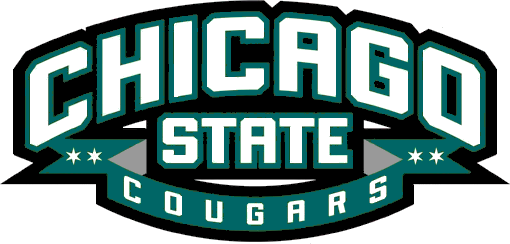
- Conference: Northeast Conference
- Record: 7–26 (6–10 NEC)
- Head coach: Corry Irvin (1st season)
- Assistant coaches: Kiara Carter; Chanise Jenkins
- Home arena: Jones Convocation Center

2024–25 Northeast Conference women's basketball standings
	Conf.				Overall
Team	W		L	PCT	W		L	PCT
Fairleigh Dickinson †	16	–	0	1.000	29	–	4	.879
Stonehill*	11	–	5	.688	17	–	16	.515
Central Connecticut	10	–	6	.625	11	–	19	.367
Saint Francis	9	–	7	.563	11	–	19	.367
Le Moyne*	6	–	10	.375	7	–	24	.226
Mercyhurst*	6	–	10	.375	9	–	18	.333
Chicago State	6	–	10	.375	7	–	26	.212
Wagner	5	–	11	.313	8	–	21	.276
LIU	3	–	13	.188	6	–	24	.200
† 2025 NEC tournament winner * ineligible for the 2025 NCAA tournament due to transition from Division II

The 2024–25 Chicago State Cougars women's basketball team represented Chicago State University during the 2024–25 NCAA Division I women's basketball season. The Cougars, who were led by first-year head coach Corry Irvin, played their home games at the Jones Convocation Center in Chicago, Illinois as first-year members of the Northeast Conference (NEC).

The Cougars finished the season 7–26, 6–10 in NEC play, to finish in a three-way tie for fifth place. In the NEC tournament, they upset third-seeded Central Connecticut in the quarterfinals before being eliminated by top seed Fairleigh Dickinson in the semifinals.

== Previous season ==
The Cougars finished the 2023–24 season 1–26. This was the Cougars' final season competing as an independent, as they joined the Northeast Conference, for the 2024–25 season.

During the season, on February 25, 2024, the school announced that they would be firing head coach Andrea Williams, ending her two-year tenure at the helm. On April 10, 2024, Mississippi State assistant coach Corry Irvin was announced as the team's new head coach.

== Preseason ==
On October 23, 2024, the NEC released their preseason coaches poll. Chicago State was picked to finish tied for last place in the NEC regular season.

=== Preseason rankings ===
NEC preseason poll
Predicted finish	Team
1	Fairleigh Dickinson
2	Central Connecticut
3	Le Moyne
4	Stonehill
5	Saint Francis
6	Wagner
7	LIU
T–8	Mercyhurst
T–8	Chicago State

=== Preseason All-NEC Team ===
No Cougars were named to the Preseason All-NEC team.

== Roster ==
2024–25 Chicago State Cougars women's basketball team
Players
Coaches

Pos.	#	Name	Height	Year	Previous school	Hometown
G	1	Aiyanna Culver	5 ft 3 in (1.6 m)	Fr	Christ the King Regional High School	Queens, NY
G	4	Tania Allen	6 ft 0 in (1.83 m)	Sr	Kennesaw State	Chicago, IL
G	5	Hailey Hohenecker	5 ft 3 in (1.6 m)	Sr	Little Rock	Plymouth, MN
F	10	Evangelina Parrish	6 ft 0 in (1.83 m)	Sr	Schoolcraft College	Detroit, MI
G	11	Asha Walker	5 ft 10 in (1.78 m)	So	Stanislaus State	Fremont, CA
F	12	Taylor Norris	5 ft 10 in (1.78 m)	Sr	Bishop Kearney High School	Rochester, NY
C	14	Josie Hill	6 ft 1 in (1.85 m)	Jr	Central High School	Rapid City, SD
G	15	Ja'Cia Cunningham	5 ft 8 in (1.73 m)	Jr	Milwaukee School of Languages	Milwaukee, WI
G	21	Marisa Gant	5 ft 8 in (1.73 m)	Fr	Springfield Southeast High School	Springfield, IL
G	25	Keona McGee	5 ft 8 in (1.73 m)	Fr	Dominican High School	Milwaukee, WI
G	30	Kyara Champagne	5 ft 7 in (1.7 m)	Fr	Holy Cross High School	Queens, NY
C	31	Kayla Mount	6 ft 1 in (1.85 m)	Fr	Cass Tech High School	Detroit, MI
F	33	Kace Urlacher	6 ft 1 in (1.85 m)	So	IUPUI	Palatine, IL
G	35	Tally Williams	5 ft 9 in (1.75 m)	Fr	South Shore High School	Queens, NY

Head coach

- Corry Irvin (Fresno State)

Assistant coach(es)

- Kiara Carter (Michigan State)
- Chanise Jenkins (DePaul)

Legend

- (C) Team captain
- (S) Suspended
- (I) Ineligible
- (W) Walk-on
- Injured
- Current redshirt

Roster
Last update: May 5, 2025

== Schedule and results ==
Date time, TV	Rank^{#}	Opponent^{#}	Result	Record	Site (attendance) city, state
Non-conference regular season
November 4, 2024*; 11:00 a.m., ESPN+		at No. 8 Iowa State	L 56–96	0–1	Hilton Coliseum (9,983); Ames, IA
November 6, 2024*; 10:00 a.m.		at Butler	L 45–87	0–2	Hinkle Fieldhouse (2,941); Indianapolis, IN
November 9, 2024*; 4:30 p.m., NEC Front Row		Cleveland State	L 67–111	0–3	Jones Convocation Center (3,462); Chicago, IL
November 12, 2024*; 6:00 p.m., SECN+		at Florida	L 35–104	0–4	O'Connell Center (991); Gainesville, FL
November 16, 2024*; 1:00 p.m., NEC Front Row		Arizona	L 48–84	0–5	Jones Convocation Center (333); Chicago, IL
November 18, 2024*; 6:00 p.m., NEC Front Row		Western Illinois	L 75–93	0–6	Jones Convocation Center (140); Chicago, IL
November 20, 2024*; 6:00 p.m., NEC Front Row		Northern Illinois	L 68–77	0–7	Jones Convocation Center (143); Chicago, IL
November 25, 2024*; 6:30 p.m., ESPN+		at Oklahoma State	L 50–113	0–8	Gallagher-Iba Arena (2,080); Stillwater, OK
November 27, 2024*; 6:30 p.m., ESPN+		at Tulsa	L 46–76	0–9	Reynolds Center (1,300); Tulsa, OK
December 3, 2024*; 11:00 a.m., NEC Front Row		Bradley	L 57–75	0–10	Jones Convocation Center (575); Chicago, IL
December 8, 2024*; 5:00 p.m., NEC Front Row		Mississippi State	L 42–102	0–11	Jones Convocation Center (235); Chicago, IL
December 15, 2024*; 1:00 p.m., NEC Front Row		Illinois State	L 52–79	0–12	Jones Convocation Center (149); Chicago, IL
December 17, 2024*; 11:00 a.m., ESPN+		at Loyola Chicago	L 68–70 ^{OT}	0–13	Joseph J. Gentile Arena (3,455); Chicago, IL
December 20, 2024*; 4:00 p.m.		vs. SMU; Evan Moore Classic	L 52–73	0–14	The Super Pit (398); Denton, TX
December 21, 2024*; 3:00 p.m., ESPN+		at North Texas; Evan Moore Classic	L 57–83	0–15	The Super Pit (1,422); Denton, TX
NEC regular season
January 2, 2025; 6:00 p.m., NEC Front Row		Wagner	L 73–85	0–16 (0–1)	Jones Convocation Center (196); Chicago, IL
January 4, 2025; 1:00 p.m., NEC Front Row		LIU	W 64–59 ^{OT}	1–16 (1–1)	Jones Convocation Center; Chicago, IL
January 9, 2025; 6:00 p.m., NEC Front Row		at Stonehill	L 75–77 ^{2OT}	1–17 (1–2)	Merkert Gymnasium (127); Easton, MA
January 18, 2025; 11:00 a.m., NEC Front Row		at Le Moyne	L 71–77 ^{OT}	1–18 (1–3)	Ted Grant Court (377); DeWitt, NY
January 20, 2025; 1:00 p.m., NEC Front Row		at Fairleigh Dickinson	L 43–49	1–19 (1–4)	Bogota Savings Bank Center (309); Hackensack, NJ
January 23, 2025; 6:00 p.m., NEC Front Row		Central Connecticut	W 84–77	2–19 (2–4)	Jones Convocation Center (97); Chicago, IL
January 25, 2025; 1:00 p.m., NEC Front Row		Stonehill	L 64–66	2–20 (2–5)	Jones Convocation Center (113); Chicago, IL
February 1, 2025; 1:00 p.m., ESPN+		at LIU	W 55–49	3–20 (3–5)	Steinberg Wellness Center (178); Brooklyn, NY
February 6, 2025; 5:00 p.m., NEC Front Row		at Mercyhurst	L 69–76 ^{OT}	3–21 (3–6)	Owen McCormick Court (410); Erie, PA
February 8, 2025; 3:00 p.m., NEC Front Row		at Saint Francis	L 58–63	3–22 (3–7)	DeGol Arena (446); Loretto, PA
February 13, 2025; 6:00 p.m., NEC Front Row		Fairleigh Dickinson	L 70–74	3–23 (3–8)	Jones Convocation Center (112); Chicago, IL
February 15, 2025; 1:00 p.m., NEC Front Row		Le Moyne	W 76–60	4–23 (4–8)	Jones Convocation Center; Chicago, IL
February 20, 2025; 6:00 p.m., NEC Front Row		at Central Connecticut	L 61–62	4–24 (4–9)	William H. Detrick Gymnasium (302); New Britain, CT
February 22, 2025; 12:00 p.m., NEC Front Row		at Wagner	L 52–58	4–25 (4–10)	Spiro Sports Center (280); Staten Island, NY
February 27, 2025; 6:00 p.m., NEC Front Row		Mercyhurst	W 77–63	5–25 (5–10)	Jones Convocation Center (245); Chicago, IL
March 1, 2025; 1:00 p.m., NEC Front Row		Saint Francis	W 58–55 ^{OT}	6–25 (6–10)	Jones Convocation Center (330); Chicago, IL
NEC tournament
March 10, 2025; 6:00 p.m., NEC Front Row	(6)	at (3) Central Connecticut; Quarterfinals	W 70–60	7–25	William H. Detrick Gymnasium (602); New Britain, CT
March 13, 2025; 6:00 p.m., ESPN+	(6)	at (1) Fairleigh Dickinson; Semifinals	L 61–90	7–26	Bogota Savings Bank Center (1,342); Hackensack, NJ
*Non-conference game. ^{#}Rankings from AP poll. (#) Tournament seedings in parentheses. All times are in Central.
