= Nick DiPillo =

American basketball player, coach, and administrator

Current position
- Title: Head coach
- Team: Le Moyne
- Conference: NEC

Biographical details
- Education: Fairleigh Dickinson University

Coaching career (HC unless noted)
- 2003–2005: Kean University (asst.)
- 2005–2009: New York Liberty (asst.)
- 2017–2018: Seton Hall (asst.)
- 2019–2022: Scranton
- 2022–2023: Pittsburgh (asst.)
- 2023–2024: Bowling Green (asst.)
- 2024–present: Le Moyne

Administrative career (AD unless noted)
- 2014–2017: Seton Hall (director of player development)

Head coaching record
- Overall: 77–53 (.592)

Nick DiPillo is the head women's basketball coach for Le Moyne. He was previously an assistant coach for the Bowling Green Falcons women's basketball program. Prior to his time with the Falcons, DiPillo was the head coach of the women's basketball team at Scranton from 2019 to 2022.

== Early life and education ==
Raised in North Brunswick, New Jersey, DiPillo played basketball at North Brunswick Township High School. He played collegiate basketball for Rutgers–Camden before transferring to Fairleigh Dickinson.

== Career ==
DiPillo started his coaching career as an assistant coach for the Division III Kean men's basketball team. The Cougars compiled a 34–19 record during his two-year stint and captured the ECAC Metro championship in 2005.

He then served as an assistant coach for the New York Liberty of the WNBA from 2005 to the spring of 2009. He would help the Liberty make three playoff appearances (2005, 2007 and 2008). Among other roles, DiPillo served as post coach for the Liberty. He also coached a trio of WNBA All-Stars and three Olympians while with the Liberty, including 2007 WNBA Most Improved Player Janel McCarville.

From 2010 to 2014, DiPillo served as a skills trainer and camp director at the Monroe Sports Center in Monroe Township, New Jersey.

In 2014, DiPillo became director of player development for Seton Hall's women's program and was promoted to assistant coach in 2017. In 2015, Seton Hall won their first Big East Conference championship in program history and advanced to the NCAA tournament for the first time since 1995.

On June 12, 2019, DiPillo was named seventh head coach in the University of Scranton women's basketball program's 45-year history. In three seasons, DiPillo compiled a 58–8 record, two Landmark Conference championships and an NCAA Sweet Sixteen appearance.

On June 21, 2022, DiPillo was hired as an assistant coach for the Pittsburgh women's team.

In May 2023, DiPillo joined Bowling Green as an assistant women's basketball coach.

In May 2024, DiPillo was named as the head coach of the Le Moyne Dolphins women's basketball program.

== Head coaching record ==
Record table
Season	Team	Overall	Conference	Standing	Postseason
Scranton Lady Royals (Landmark Conference) (2019–2022)
2019–20	Scranton	24–4	12–2	1st	NCAA First Round
2020–21	Scranton	7–1	6–1	1st	Tournament canceled - COVID-19
2021–22	Scranton	27–3	14–0	1st	NCAA Sweet Sixteen
Scranton:		58–8 (.879)	32–3 (.914)		
Le Moyne Dolphins (Northeast Conference) (2024–present)
2024–25	Le Moyne	7–24	6–10	T–5th	
2025–26	Le Moyne	12–21	9–9	T–4th	
Le Moyne:		19–45 (.297)	15–19 (.441)		
Total:		77–53 (.592)			
National champion Postseason invitational champion Conference regular season champion Conference regular season and conference tournament champion Division regular season champion Division regular season and conference tournament champion Conference tournament champion
