= 2025 Northeast Conference women's basketball tournament =

- Classification: Division I
- Season: 2024–25
- Teams: 8
- Site: Campus sites
- Television: ESPNU, ESPN+, NEC Front Row

2024–25 Northeast Conference women's basketball standings
	Conf.				Overall
Team	W		L	PCT	W		L	PCT
Fairleigh Dickinson †	16	–	0	1.000	29	–	4	.879
Stonehill*	11	–	5	.688	17	–	16	.515
Central Connecticut	10	–	6	.625	11	–	19	.367
Saint Francis	9	–	7	.563	11	–	19	.367
Le Moyne*	6	–	10	.375	7	–	24	.226
Mercyhurst*	6	–	10	.375	9	–	18	.333
Chicago State	6	–	10	.375	7	–	26	.212
Wagner	5	–	11	.313	8	–	21	.276
LIU	3	–	13	.188	6	–	24	.200
† 2025 NEC tournament winner * ineligible for the 2025 NCAA tournament due to transition from Division II

The 2025 Northeast Conference Women's Basketball Tournament was the postseason women's basketball tournament for the Northeast Conference for the 2024–25 NCAA Division I women's basketball season. The tournament took place on three dates between March 10 and 16, 2025, with all tournament games played in the home arenas of the higher-seeded school. The winner would receive the conference's automatic bid to the 2025 NCAA tournament, provided such team was eligible. If a reclassifying institution won the NEC tournament championship, the tournament runner-up would be awarded the NEC's automatic bid to the NCAA tournament. If two reclassifying teams, i.e. Le Moyne and Stonehill, reached the final of the NEC tournament, the conference would stage an automatic qualifier game between the two non-advancing semifinalists. Since Le Moyne and Stonehill were matched up against each other in the tournament semifinals, an ineligible team was guaranteed to reach the NEC final. Consequently, the winner of the semifinal between Fairleigh Dickinson and Chicago State, ultimately Fairleigh Dickinson, received the NEC's automatic bid to the NCAA tournament. FDU made its NCAA Division I tournament debut.

This was the final women's tournament held under the "Northeast Conference" name. On October 2, 2025, the conference changed its name to its longstanding initialism of NEC.

== Seeds ==
For the third straight year, the NEC changed its rules regarding eligibility for the conference tournament. Teams transitioning from Division II may participate in the NEC tournament starting with the third year of their transition. Therefore, Mercyhurst will not be eligible for the NEC tournament until 2027. The change is prospective rather than retroactive. Consequently, Le Moyne, in their second transition year, remain eligible for the 2025 tournament. This means the eight conference members other than Mercyhurst will participate in the tournament. In 2024, the top eight teams in the conference regular-season standings qualified, and all transitioning NEC teams were eligible for the conference tournament.

Teams will be seeded by record within the conference, with a tiebreaker system to seed teams with identical conference records. Although Mercyhurst is ineligible for the tournament, they may still be involved in a tiebreaker and affect the outcome of a multi-team tie.

Seed	School	Conf.	Tiebreaker
1	Fairleigh Dickinson	16–0	
2	Stonehill	11–5	
3	Central Connecticut	10–6	
4	Saint Francis	9–7	
5	Le Moyne	6–10	1–1 vs. Stonehill
6	Chicago State	6–10	0–2 vs. Stonehill
7	Wagner	5–11	
8	LIU	3–13	
DNQ	Mercyhurst	6–10	

== Schedule ==
Game	Time*	Matchup	Score	Television
Quarterfinals – Monday, March 10
1	7 p.m.	No. 8 LIU at No. 1 Fairleigh Dickinson	44–73	NEC Front Row
2	7 p.m.	No. 7 Wagner at No. 2 Stonehill	50–72	NEC Front Row
3	7 p.m.	No. 6 Chicago State at No. 3 Central Connecticut	70–60	NEC Front Row
4	7 p.m.	No. 5 Le Moyne at No. 4 Saint Francis	62–51	NEC Front Row
Semifinals – Thursday, March 13
5	7 p.m.	No. 6 Chicago State at No. 1 Fairleigh Dickinson	61–90	ESPN+
6	7 p.m.	No. 5 Le Moyne at No. 2 Stonehill	41–60	ESPN+
Championship – Sunday, March 16
7	12 p.m.	No. 2 Stonehill at No. 1 Fairleigh Dickinson	49–66	ESPNU
*Game times in EDT (UTC−4). Rankings denote tournament seed.

== Bracket ==
Teams will be reseeded after each round with the highest remaining seeds receiving home-court advantage.

Quarterfinals; Monday, March 10; NEC Front Row
1	Fairleigh Dickinson	73
8	LIU	44
4	Saint Francis	51
5	Le Moyne	62
Pairings are reseeded after the quarterfinals.
2	Stonehill	72
7	Wagner	50
3	Central Connecticut	60
6	Chicago State	70

Semifinals; Thursday, March 13; ESPN+
1	Fairleigh Dickinson	90
6	Chicago State	61
2	Stonehill	60
5	Le Moyne	41

Championship; Sunday, March 16; ESPNU
1	Fairleigh Dickinson	66
2	Stonehill	49

== Game summaries ==
All times are in EDT (UTC−4).

=== Semifinals ===
*** Note: The winner of Chicago State–Fairleigh Dickinson game will receive the NEC's automatic bid to the NCAA tournament, since both Stonehill and Le Moyne are ineligible for NCAA postseason play as institutions reclassifying from Division II. ***

== Awards and honors ==
Tournament MVP:

NEC All-Tournament Team

== Statistics ==
Source:
