= 2024–25 Seton Hall Pirates women's basketball team =

Intercollegiate basketball season

2024–25 Seton Hall Pirates women's basketball

WBIT, Second Round
- Conference: Big East Conference
- Record: 23–10 (13–5 Big East)
- Head coach: Anthony Bozzella (12th season)
- Assistant coaches: Jose Rebimbas; Cassandra Callaway; Ka-Deidre Simmons
- Home arena: Walsh Gymnasium

2024–25 Big East women's basketball standings
	Conf.				Overall
Team	W		L	PCT	W		L	PCT
No. 1 UConn †	18	–	0	1.000	37	–	3	.925
No. 23 Creighton	16	–	2	.889	26	–	7	.788
Seton Hall	13	–	5	.722	23	–	10	.697
Marquette	12	–	6	.667	21	–	11	.656
Villanova	11	–	7	.611	21	–	15	.583
DePaul	8	–	10	.444	13	–	19	.406
Providence	6	–	12	.333	13	–	19	.406
St. John's	5	–	13	.278	16	–	15	.516
Butler	5	–	13	.278	16	–	18	.471
Georgetown	4	–	14	.222	12	–	19	.387
Xavier	1	–	17	.056	7	–	24	.226
† 2025 Big East tournament winner Rankings from AP poll

The 2024–25 Seton Hall Pirates women's basketball team represented Seton Hall University during the 2024–25 NCAA Division I women's basketball season. The Pirates, led by twelfth-year head coach Anthony Bozzella, played their home games in South Orange, New Jersey, at the Walsh Gymnasium as members of the Big East Conference.

== Previous season ==
The Pirates finished the season 17–15, 8–10 in Big East play to finish seventh place. They defeated DePaul in the first round of the Big East women's tournament before losing to Creighton in the quarterfinals. They received an at-large bid to the WBIT where they lost in the first round to Saint Joseph's.

== Offseason ==
=== Departures ===
Seton Hall Departures
Name	Num	Pos.	Height	Year	Hometown	Reason for Departure
Makennah White	0	F	6'2"	Senior	Farrell, PA	Transferred to Missouri State
Sha'Lynn Hagans	1	G	5'6"	Graduate student	Manassas, VA	Graduated
Micah Gray	3	G	5'8"	Sophomore	Oklahoma City, OK	Transferred to Oklahoma State
Shannon Mulroy	10	G	5'8"	Graduate student	Mount Laurel, NJ	Graduated
Kae Satterfield	13	G/F	6'0"	Graduate student	New York, NY	Graduated
Azana Baines	15	G	6'1"	Graduate student	Blackwood, NJ	Graduated
Brazil Harvey-Carr	23	F	6'1"	Graduate student	Camden, NJ	Graduated
A'Jah Davis	25	F/C	6'1"	Graduate student	DeKalb, IL	Graduated

=== Incoming transfers ===
Seton Hall incoming transfers
Name	Num	Pos.	Height	Year	Hometown	Previous School
Faith Masonius	3	G	6'2"	Graduate Student	Clarksburg, MD	Maryland
Savanna Jones	4	F	6'2"	Sophomore	Eden Prairie, MN	NDSCS
Nicole Melious	10	G	5'8"	Sophomore	Staten Island, NY	La Salle
Messiah Hunter	13	F	6'2"	(redshirt) Junior	Hopewell, VA	West Virginia
Kaydan Lawson	14	G	6'0"	Graduate Student	Cleveland, OH	Virginia
Ramani Parker	24	F	6'4"	Graduate Student	Fresno, CA	Mississippi State

==== Recruiting class of 2024 ====
College recruiting information
Name	Hometown	School	Height	Weight	Commit date
Jada Eads; G	Orlando, FL	Lake Highland Prep	5 ft 7 in (1.70 m)	N/A	
Jada Eads; G	Recruit ratings: No ratings found				
Ja'Kahla Craft; G	Elk River, MN	St. Michael-Albertville	5 ft 9 in (1.75 m)	N/A	
Ja'Kahla Craft; G	Recruit ratings: No ratings found				
Baylor Franz; G	Edmond, OK	Edmond Memorial	5 ft 6 in (1.68 m)	N/A	
Baylor Franz; G	Recruit ratings: No ratings found				
Overall recruit ranking:
Note: In many cases, Scout, Rivals, 247Sports, On3, and ESPN may conflict in their listings of height and weight.; In these cases, the average was taken. ESPN grades are on a 100-point scale.; Sources:

== Roster ==
2024–25 Seton Hall Pirates women's basketball team
Players
Coaches

Pos.	#	Name	Height	Year	Previous school	Hometown
F	0	Jada Eads	5 ft 2 in (1.57 m)	Fr	Lake Highland Prep	Orlando, FL
F	1	Joniyah Bland-Fitzpatrick	5 ft 10 in (1.78 m)	So	Westtown School	New London, CT
G	2	Ja'Kahla Craft	5 ft 9 in (1.75 m)	Fr	St. Michael-Albertville	Elk River, MN
F	3	Faith Masonius	6 ft 1 in (1.85 m)	GS	Manasquan High School; Maryland	Spring Lake, NJ
F/C	4	Savanna Jones	6 ft 2 in (1.88 m)	So	Eden Prairie; North Dakota State	Eden Prairie, MN
G	5	Savannah Catalon	5 ft 8 in (1.73 m)	So	Mansfield Legacy	Burleson, TX
F	7	Yaya Lops	6 ft 3 in (1.91 m)	GS	Trinity Catholic; St. Bonaventure	Stamford, CT
F	10	Nicole Melious	5 ft 8 in (1.73 m)	So	Susan E. Wagner; La Salle	Staten Island, NY
F	13	Messiah Hunter	6 ft 2 in (1.88 m)	Jr	TPLS Christian Academy; West Virginia	Hopewell, VA
G/F	15	Kaydan Lawson	6 ft 0 in (1.83 m)	GS	Orange; Virginia	Cleveland OH
F	20	Sydnee Eggleton	5 ft 11 in (1.8 m)	So	Peddie School	Thomaston, CT
G/F	21	Shailyn Pinkney	5 ft 10 in (1.78 m)	Jr	East Hartford	East Hartford, CT
G	22	Amari Wright	5 ft 9 in (1.75 m)	GS	Sandalwood	Jacksonville, FL
G	23	Baylor Franz	5 ft 6 in (1.68 m)	Fr	Edmond Memorial	Edmond, OK
F	24	Ramani Parker	6 ft 4 in (1.93 m)	GS	Montverde; Mississippi State	Fresno, CA

Head coach

- Anthony Bozzella (Seton Hall)

Assistant coach(es)

- Jose Rebimbas (Seton Hall)
- Cassandra Callaway (Albany)
- Ka-Deidre Simmons (Seton Hall)

Legend

- (C) Team captain
- (S) Suspended
- (I) Ineligible
- (W) Walk-on
- Injured
- Current redshirt

Roster

== Schedule and results ==
Date time, TV	Rank^{#}	Opponent^{#}	Result	Record	High points	High rebounds	High assists	Site (attendance) city, state
Exhibition
November 2, 2024*; 12:00 p.m.		Jefferson	W 87–61		22 – Catalon	6 – Lops	7 – Wright	Walsh Gymnasium (512); South Orange, NJ
Non-conference regular season
November 7, 2024*; 7:00 p.m., FloCollege		Wagner	W 84–40	1–0	23 – Masonius	6 – Tied	10 – Wright	Walsh Gymnasium (750); South Orange, NJ
November 12, 2024; 7:00 p.m., FloCollege		Fordham	W 67–44	2–0	17 – Tied	7 – Lawson	6 – Masonius	Walsh Gymnasium (665); South Orange, NJ
November 16, 2024; 4:30 p.m., FloCollege		Bryant	W 55–39	3–0	22 – Masonius	7 – Tied	5 – Masonius	Walsh Gymnasium (763); South Orange, NJ
November 18, 2024*; 6:30 p.m., ESPN+		at Cincinnati	W 69–68	4–0	21 – Masonius	5 – Masonius	5 – Wright	Fifth Third Arena (903); Cincinnati, OH
November 21, 2024*; 7:00 p.m., FloCollege		Princeton	L 75–78	4–1	20 – Masonius	6 – Masonius	8 – Wright	Walsh Gymnasium (816); South Orange, NJ
November 27, 2024*; 7:00 p.m., TruTV		vs. No. 6 USC; Acrisure Holiday Invitational	L 51–84	4–2	25 – Masonius	7 – Craft	5 – Wright	Acrisure Arena; Palm Springs, CA
December 2, 2024*; 7:00 p.m., FloCollege		San Francisco	W 59–53	5–2	26 – Catalon	5 – Catalon	4 – Wright	Walsh Gymnasium (582); South Orange, NJ
December 6, 2024*; 7:00 p.m., FloCollege		Howard	W 87–63	6–2	21 – Catalon	7 – Pinkney	5 – Tied	Walsh Gymnasium (813); South Orange, NJ
December 9, 2024*; 7:00 p.m., FloCollege		Sacred Heart	W 67–46	7–2	20 – Catalon	10 – Lops	5 – Wright	Walsh Gymnasium (1,064); South Orange, NJ
December 14, 2024*; 1:00 p.m., FloCollege		Le Moyne	W 68–41	8–2	19 – Eads	6 – Tied	5 – Eads	Walsh Gymnasium (848); South Orange, NJ
December 17, 2024*; 6:00 p.m., FS1		vs. No. 5 LSU; Basketball Hall of Fame Women's Showcase	L 64–91	8–3	29 – Masonius	7 – Bland-Fitzpatrick	3 – Tied	Mohegan Sun Arena (7,650); Uncasville, CT
Big East regular season
December 21, 2024; 1:00 p.m., FloCollege		Providence	W 51–40	9–3 (1–0)	25 – Eads	9 – Lawson	3 – Tied	Walsh Gymnasium (686); South Orange, NJ
December 29, 2024; 2:00 p.m., FloCollege		at Butler	W 69–49	10–3 (2–0)	26 – Eads	6 – Hunter	6 – Wright	Hinkle Fieldhouse (1,776); Indianapolis, IN
January 1, 2025; 8:30 p.m., FS1		at Villanova	W 56–55	11–3 (3–0)	17 – Masonius	9 – Lawson	5 – Wright	Finneran Pavilion (435); Villanova, PA
January 4, 2025; 1:00 p.m., FloCollege		Georgetown	W 74–71 ^{OT}	12–3 (4–0)	27 – Eads	6 – Masonius	7 – Eads	Walsh Gymnasium (847); South Orange, NJ
January 11, 2025; 12:00 p.m., FloCollege		Creighton	L 64–72	12–4 (4–1)	18 – Masonius	6 – Tied	5 – Masonius	Walsh Gymnasium (921); South Orange, NJ
January 15, 2025; 9:00 p.m., FS1		at Marquette	W 58–52	13–4 (5–1)	20 – Eads	8 – Masonius	5 – Wright	Al McGuire Center (2,126); Milwaukee, WI
January 19, 2025; 1:00 p.m., SNY		at No. 6 UConn	L 36–96	13–5 (5–2)	14 – Eads	6 – Masonius	3 – Masonius	Harry A. Gampel Pavilion (10,299); Storrs, CT
January 25, 2025; 1:00 p.m., FloCollege		St. John's	W 57–48	14–5 (6–2)	16 – Masonius	8 – Masonius	3 – Tied	Walsh Gymnasium (1,284); South Orange, NJ
January 29, 2025; 7:00 p.m., FloCollege		Butler	W 71–48	15–5 (7–2)	15 – Catalon	7 – Eads	6 – Tied	Walsh Gymnasium (900); South Orange, NJ
February 1, 2025; 3:00 p.m., FloCollege		at DePaul	W 72–55	16–5 (8–2)	21 – Masonius	8 – Catalon	8 – Wright	Wintrust Arena (1,354); Chicago, IL
February 5, 2025; 7:00 p.m., FloCollege		at Creighton	L 56–72	16–6 (8–3)	11 – Tied	5 – Tied	3 – Eads	D. J. Sokol Arena (1,153); Omaha, NE
February 8, 2025; 2:00 p.m., FS1		Xavier	W 72–47	17–6 (9–3)	17 – Catalon	8 – Lops	8 – Wright	Walsh Gymnasium (1,284); South Orange, NJ
February 12, 2025; 7:00 p.m., FloCollege		Marquette	L 61–68	17–7 (9–4)	26 – Eads	6 – Lops	3 – Tied	Walsh Gymnasium (970); South Orange, NJ
February 16, 2025; 2:00 p.m., FloCollege		at Providence	W 59–38	18–7 (10–4)	13 – Eads	9 – Masonius	4 – Masonius	Alumni Hall (844); Providence, RI
February 19, 2025; 7:00 p.m., SNY		No. 5 UConn	L 49–91	18–8 (10–5)	15 – Lops	4 – Tied	3 – Masonius	Walsh Gymnasium (1,350); South Orange, NJ
February 23, 2025; 4:30 p.m., FloCollege		at St. Johns	W 66–57	19–8 (11–5)	19 – Catalon	6 – Catalon	5 – Wright	Carnesecca Arena (527); Queens, NY
February 27, 2025; 7:00 p.m., FloCollege		DePaul	W 76–67	20–8 (12–5)	36 – Catalon	11 – Masonius	5 – Wright	Walsh Gymnasium (1,101); South Orange, NJ
March 2, 2025; 2:00 p.m., FloCollege		at Xavier	W 59–57	21–8 (13–5)	14 – Tied	7 – Lawson	5 – Catalon	Cintas Center (1,273); Cincinnati, OH
Big East Women's Tournament
March 8, 2025; 9:30 p.m., FS2	(3)	vs. (6) Xavier; Quarterfinals	W 48–40	22–8	12 – Tied	9 – Catalon	2 – Tied	Mohegan Sun Arena; Uncasville, CT
March 9, 2025; 5:00 p.m., FOX	(3)	vs. (2) No. 23 Creighton; Semifinals	L 44–73	22–9	16 – Masonius	7 – Masonius	2 – Tied	Mohegan Sun Arena; Uncasville, CT
WBIT
March 20, 2025*; 7:00 p.m., ESPN+	(3)	Quinnipiac; First round	W 57–40	23–9	18 – Catalon	10 – Eads	3 – Wright	Walsh Gymnasium; South Orange, NJ
March 23, 2025*; 4:00 p.m., ESPN+	(3)	Portland; Second round	L 55–61	23–10	18 – Eads	10 – Eads	4 – Lawson	Walsh Gymnasium (736); South Orange, NJ
*Non-conference game. ^{#}Rankings from AP Poll. (#) Tournament seedings in parentheses. All times are in Eastern Time.

== Rankings ==
Ranking movements
	Week																				
Poll	Pre	1	2	3	4	5	6	7	8	9	10	11	12	13	14	15	16	17	18	19	Final
AP																					Not released
Coaches																					

== See also ==
- 2024–25 Seton Hall Pirates men's basketball team
