= Le Moyne Dolphins women's basketball =

NCAA Division I women's basketball team representing Le Moyne College

2025–26 Le Moyne Dolphins women's basketball team
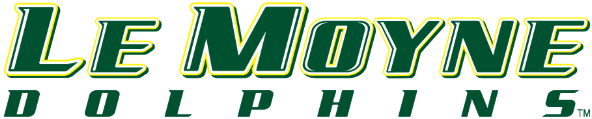
- University: Le Moyne College
- First season: 1958–59 67 years ago
- Athletic director: Phil Brown
- Head coach: Nick DiPillo (2nd season)
- Location: DeWitt, New York (Note: The campus, including the Le Moyne Events Center, has a Syracuse mailing address but lies within the adjacent town of DeWitt.)
- Arena: Le Moyne Events Center (capacity: 2,000)
- Conference: NEC
- Nickname: Dolphins
- Colors: Green and gold

NCAA Division II tournament Sweet Sixteen
- 2019

NCAA Division II tournament appearances
- 2002, 2019, 2020, 2022, 2023

Conference tournament champions
- NE10: 2019

Conference regular-season champions
- 2023 (Note: Co-champions with Assumption.)

Conference division champions
- 2019, 2022 (Note: Co-champions with Pace.)

Uniforms
Home	Away

The Le Moyne Dolphins women's basketball program is the women's college basketball team of Le Moyne College. The Dolphins compete in Division I of the National Collegiate Athletic Association (NCAA) in the Northeast Conference and are currently coached by Nick DiPillo. The Dolphins have played their home games on Ted Grant Court at the Le Moyne Events Center in DeWitt, New York. After years of playing in the Northeast-10 Conference in NCAA Division II, the Dolphins are currently transitioning to Division I and are ineligible to participate in the NCAA tournament until the 2027–28 season.

== History ==
Le Moyne had a women's basketball team in the eight-team City League, which called itself the Le Moyne College Girls' Basketball Team, during the 1958–59 season. The team won three of its first four games, and the effort was led by senior Barbara Wood, chairman of the Le Moyne women's athletic association. Lynn Eisenhauer was also a member of the team.

On January 9, 1960, the team defeated the Hancock Field Women's Air Force team, 42–25, at the West Jefferson Street Armory in the opener of a doubleheader that also featured the men's team against Clarkson. Sue McCann led Le Moyne with 20 points, while Patty Sue Young and Joanne Pospeich added 10 each.

Le Moyne participated in the Women's Recreation Basketball League during the 1960–61 season.

During the 1961–62 academic year, Le Moyne's women's athletic association organized women's basketball as an intramural sport. Four teams competed in the intramural league: the Seven-Ups, captained by Nan Hurtubise, the Four Freshmen, co-captained by Rose Van Epps and Madeline Welch, the Mufki-Pufkis, captained by Nancy Allen and the Sound Offs led by captain Patty Sue Young. The teams played a six-game schedule, meeting each of the other three teams twice. Games were played on Mondays at the Charles Andrews School. The Seven-Ups were the league champions, and trophies were presented to the winning team members: Nancy Dillon, Rita Ruane, Betty Graf, Emily Hodapp and Rita Amyott. Pat Resch was named most valuable player. Martha del Vecchio won the most improved player award. Rose Van Epps was honored as the most sportsmanlike player. Ruane was elected president of the women's athletic association for the 1962–63 academic year.

Intercollegiate women's varsity basketball was revived at Le Moyne in December 1962. The initial team members were Pat Resch, Carol Collins, Claire Cunnion, Rita Ruane, Dale Amend, Barbara Schlaerth, Nancy Dillon and Bernadette Baecher. Elizabeth Schuchman joined the team before its first game, which was at the Le Moyne Athletic Center against Auburn Community College on February 9, 1963. Led by head coach Sue Gibbons, the Dolphinettes, as they were called, won that opening game, 33–26. Nancy Dillon and Dale Amend led the way with 12 points each. The Dolphinettes also earned a road win against Auburn Community, 48–46, in overtime. Bernie Baecher had 18 points in that game, and Amend added 17. The Dolphinettes dominated Nazareth, 48–6. Le Moyne did not allow a field goal in the game. Freshman Donna Argenbright led the way with 13 points, and Baecher added 11. The Dolphinettes outscored the Syracuse Orangewomen in a mid-season scrimmage. Le Moyne completed their perfect season with a 4–0 record, when they beat Cazenovia, 36–14, on March 16. Amend led the way with 17 points, and Baecher added 11 in the season finale.

Women's basketball was played primarily as an intramural sport at Le Moyne during the 1963–64 academic year. However, a varsity team, captained by Bernadette Baecher, was selected from the intramural players and hosted a Syracuse intramural team in March 1964, but the Dolphinettes were defeated by the Orange. The Le Moyne women's athletic association organized basketball as an intramural sport during the 1964–65 academic year as well.

In fall 1968, plans were announced to field a women's varsity basketball team for the 1968–69 season. However, it is unclear whether this took place. Women's intramural basketball was planned for the 1970–71 academic year. There was hope that enough interest would be expressed to form a varsity team. Cathy Coughlin was the student who took the lead on organizing women's basketball. In November 1970, it was announced that women's intramural and intercollegiate basketball competition would begin in the spring 1971 semester. Tryouts for the women's varsity team were scheduled for December 14, 1970. Games were scheduled against Onondaga Community College, Nazareth and Oswego State. In February 1971, Onondaga Community College was replaced on the schedule by Cazenovia. The Dolphinettes improved their record to 2–0 with a 35–24 win over Oswego State. Patty McCarthy scored 16 points to top Le Moyne's scoring list for the second straight game. A road game at Syracuse was scheduled for March 11.

Le Moyne played five intercollegiate games in the 1971–72 season and finished with an 0–5 record.

An eight-game varsity schedule was planned for the 1972–73 season. The team opened on January 18, 1973, with a 40–31 victory over Cazenovia, led by the hot shooting of Sue Mellie, the strong rebounding of Eileen Brewer and the guard play of Mary Jo Muellner. The second game on the schedule was a home matinee against Siena on January 27, with the men's teams meeting that same evening. Facing a tough zone defense, the Lady Dolphins started 0 for 10 from the floor but still managed to take an early 8–2 lead, after Mellie heated up. Despite a rebounding edge, Le Moyne could not penetrate Siena's zone and were called for 20 fouls compared with only 11 charged to the Indians. The Lady Dolphins fell, 25–23. Mellie scored 16 points to lead the Dolphinettes to a 37–35 road win at Cazenovia on February 1. Beth Ackley's defense sparked a Le Moyne comeback that erased a 10-point deficit and built an eight-point Dolphinettes lead. Le Moyne survived a late Cazenovia run to hold on for the two-point victory. The Dolphinettes fell to 2–2 on the season after suffering a 42–25 home loss to Syracuse on February 3, in which their new uniforms debuted. Previously, the women's team had played in tee-shirts and gym shorts. The Dolphinettes had a game scheduled for February 15 at Syracuse.

Efforts were made to organize a women's varsity basketball team for the 1973–74 season, with tryouts held on November 13.

More than 100 women played intramural basketball at Le Moyne during the 1974–75 academic year.

Le Moyne launched its women's varsity basketball program in earnest during the 1975–76 season, opening with a home game on February 10, 1976, against Nazareth. The Dolphins were coached by Le Moyne athletic director Tommy Niland, who retired as the head coach of the men's team three years earlier after 25 years at the helm. Niland said he wanted to coach the team to get a first-hand look at women's athletics to help him formulate future commitments the school should make to women's sports. The Guppies, as they were called by the student newspaper, fell to Nazareth, 53–28. Wendy Archinald had 10 points and eight blocked shots for Le Moyne.

Official statistics for Dolphins women's basketball only go back to the 1976–77 season.

Stacy Schrader, then a junior, recorded the first triple-double in program history on January 19, 2002. She scored 12 points, grabbed 10 rebounds and blocked 10 shots in the Dolphins' 60–54 home victory over Franklin Pierce. The 10 blocked shots set a new program record, which she broke, when she had 13 in a November 2002 game.

== Postseason appearances ==
=== NCAA Division II ===
During their time in NCAA Division II, the Dolphins were selected to play in the NCAA Division II women's basketball tournament five times. They were selected for the 2020 tournament, but it was not held due to the cancellation of the tournament with the COVID-19 pandemic. They had a combined record of 2–4.

Year	Round	Opponent	Result
2002	First Round	Bentley	L 54–65
2019	First Round; Second Round; Sweet Sixteen	St. Thomas Aquinas; University of the Sciences; Saint Anselm	W 55–43; W 63–56; L 61–63
2020	First Round	St. Anselm	N/A
2022	First Round	USciences	L 38–64
2023	First Round	Bentley	L 39–53

=== WNIT ===
Year	Round	Opponent	Result
2024	First Round	Niagara	L 86–91
