= Cégep de Saint-Jean-sur-Richelieu =

Public college in Saint-Jean-sur-Richelieu, Quebec

Coordinates: 45°17′52.03″N 73°16′0.33″W

Cégep Saint-Jean-sur-Richelieu
- Type: CEGEP
- Established: 1968
- Affiliations: non-denominational
- Academic affiliations: ACCC, CCAA, QSSF, AUCC, Collège militaire royal de Saint-Jean, CBIE
- Undergraduates: 2600, 1000 distance education
- Location: Saint-Jean-sur-Richelieu, Quebec, Canada
- Campus: Urban Haut-Richelieu, 30 km (19 mi) from Montreal, Quebec
- Colours: Blue & gold
- Website: www.cstjean.qc.ca
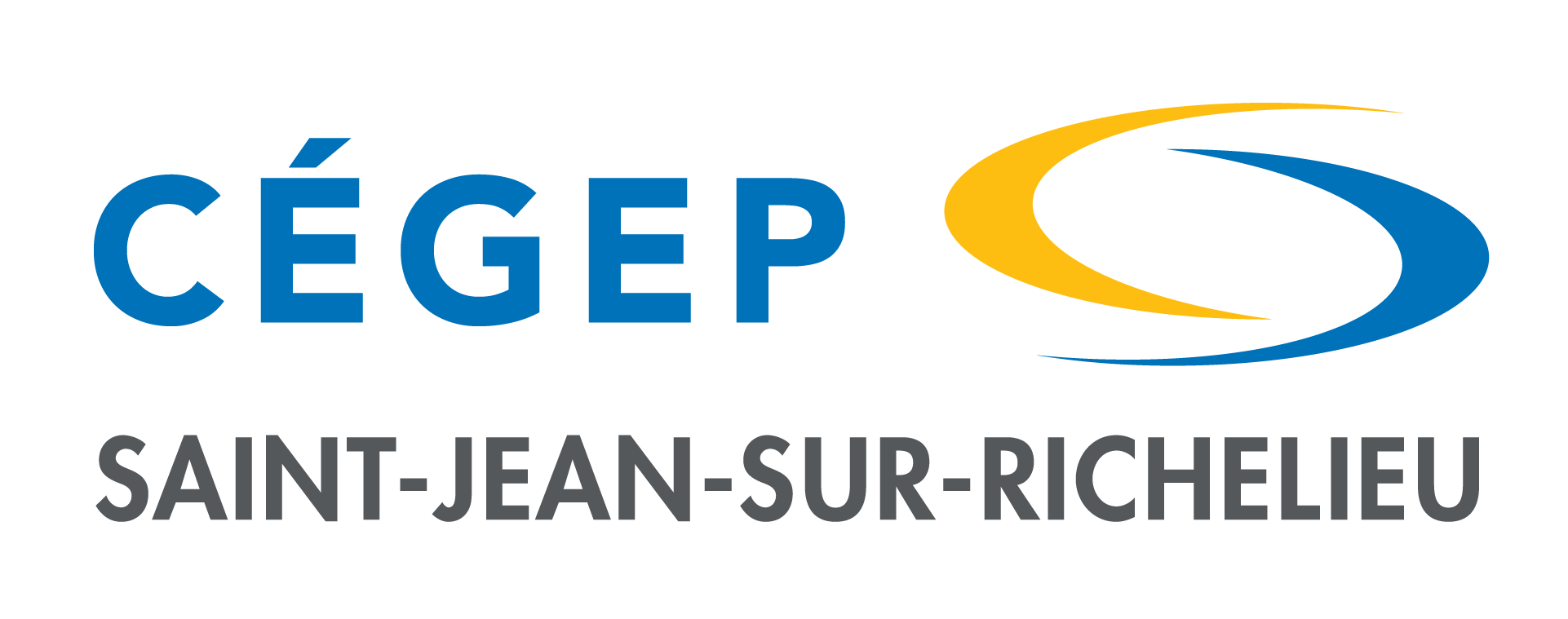

The Cégep Saint-Jean-sur-Richelieu is a post-secondary education institution (cégep: College of General and Professional Education) located in Saint-Jean-sur-Richelieu, province of Quebec, Canada. The enabling legislation is the General and Vocational Colleges Act

== History ==
The Cégep de Saint-Jean-sur-Richelieu traces its origins to the merger of several institutions which became public ones in 1967, when the Quebec system of CEGEPs was created.

== Programs ==
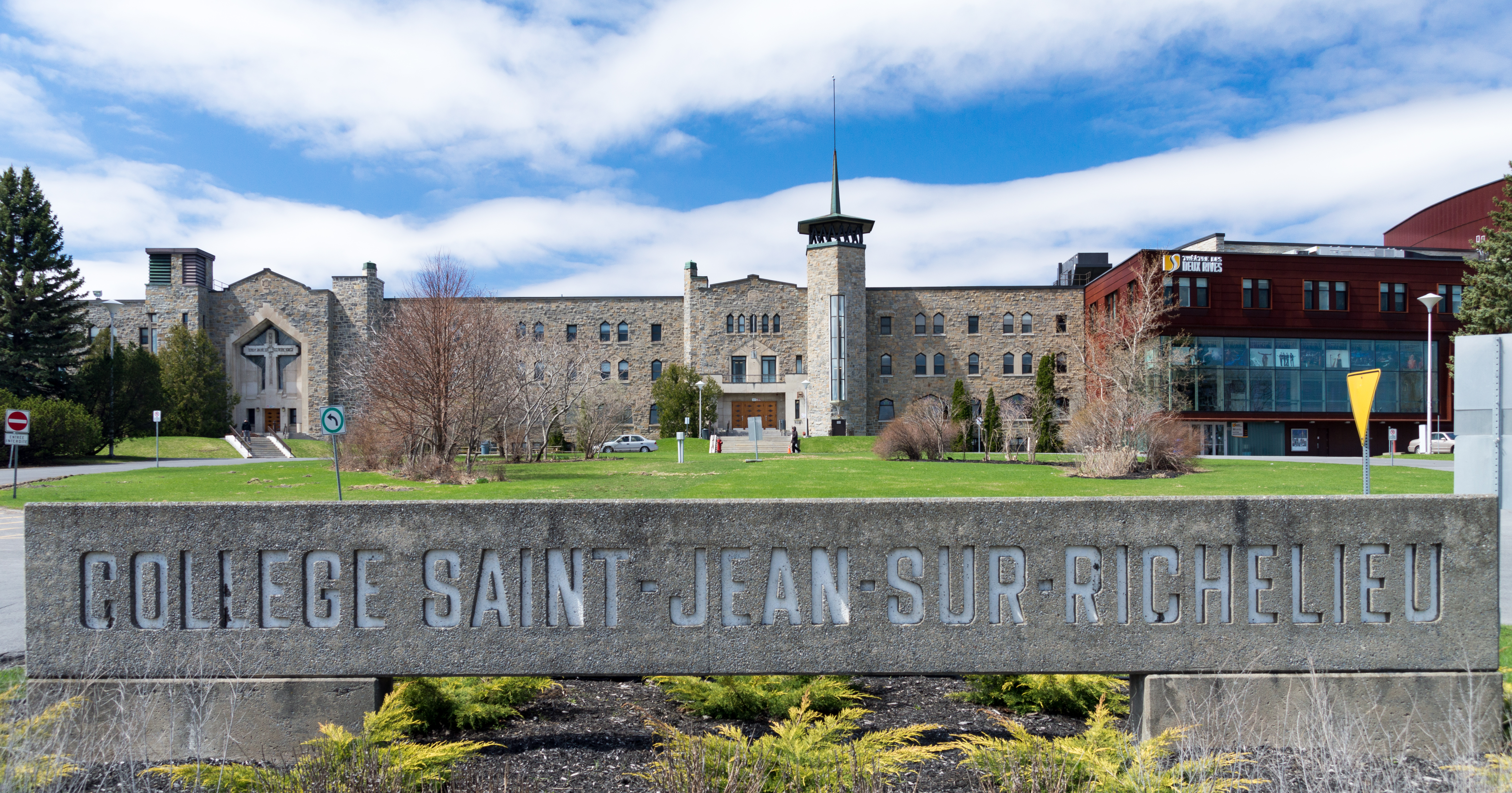
Cégep Saint-Jean sur Richelieu

Quebec students complete one fewer grade than all other Canadian provinces in total before attending CEGEP de Saint-Jean-sur-Richelieu, by ending high school in grade 11 instead of grade 12. CEGEP de Saint-Jean-sur-Richelieu then prepared students for university or to enter a technical profession. Most of the Cégep's technical programs are delivered through the Bureau de liaison avec l'entreprise (BLE – business liaison office) which coordinates internships to students in Quebec and abroad. The Province of Quebec awards a Diploma of Collegial Studies for two types of programs: two years of pre-university studies or three years of vocational (technical) studies.

It is also possible to attend a university with a 3-year technical CEGEP de Saint-Jean-sur-Richelieu diploma. The CEGEP de Saint-Jean-sur-Richelieu offers two types of programs: pre-university and technical. The pre-university programs, which take two years to complete, cover the subject matters which roughly correspond to the additional year of high school given elsewhere in Canada in preparation for a chosen field in university. The technical programs, which take three-years to complete, applies to students who wish to pursue a skilled trade.

== Facilities ==
Actiforme Consultants manages the Cégep's fitness centre. A Memorandum of Understanding between the city and the Cégep de Saint-Jean-sur-Richelieu covers maintenance of outdoor sports fields (football, soccer, tennis, softball). In exchange, municipal sports teams can use these fields free of charge after class times. The Cégep contracted management of its performance hall, Théâtre des Deux Rives, to a local non-profit organization.

== Development fund ==
To support the growth of the Cégep de Saint-Jean-sur-Richelieu, the Development fund organizes various fundraising activities, for example an annual golf tournament.

== See also ==
- List of colleges in Quebec
- Higher education in Quebec
- Education in Quebec
- R score
