= Mercyhurst Athletic Center =

Multi-purpose arena in Erie, Pennsylvania

- The MAC
- Interactive map of Mercyhurst Athletic Center
- Address: Erie, PA; United States
- Coordinates: 42.1046°N 80.0556°W
- Owner: Mercyhurst University
- Operator: Mercyhurst Univ. Athletics
- Capacity: 1,100
- Type: Multi-purpose arena
- Surface: Hardwood

Construction
- Opened: 1977; 49 years ago
- Renovated: September 17, 2021

Tenants
- Mercyhurst Lakers (NCAA) teams: men's and women's basketball; women's volleyball; wrestling

Website
- hurstathletics.com/mac

The Mercyhurst Athletic Center (often nicknamed The MAC) is a multi-purpose arena in Erie, Pennsylvania, USA. It is home to the Mercyhurst Lakers men's and women's basketball, volleyball and wrestling teams.

Originally opened in 1977, the MAC received a major renovation in 2021, rotating the court, 90 degrees, adding new seats, video scoreboards and a new playing surface. Said surface was named the Owen McCormick Court after a major contributor to the capital campaign, and said renovations were instrumental to the Lakers athletic program's impending move up to NCAA Division I.
