= Le Moyne Events Center =

Sports venue in DeWitt, New York, U.S.

- Former names: Le Moyne Athletic Center (1962–1972); Henniger Athletic Center
- Location: 500 Springfield Road; Syracuse, (Note: The venue has a Syracuse mailing address but lies within the adjacent town of DeWitt.) NY 13214, U.S.
- Owner: Le Moyne College
- Operator: Le Moyne College
- Capacity: 2,637 Detailed capacity: 2,637 (stage at west end, seating on floor); 2,000 (basketball); 1,705 (stage at north or south end, seating on floor); 685 (stage at center of floor)
- Surface: Hardwood
- Scoreboard: Yes

Construction
- Groundbreaking: March 1961
- Opened: September 16, 1962
- Renovated: 2016
- Cost: $1 million (original) $4 million (1989 addition)
- Architects: Pederson, Hueber, and Hares; James E. Glavin and Associates (landscape); QPK Design (renovation)
- General contractors: Dygert Construction Co., Inc.
- Main contractors: Edward Joy Co. (electrical, heating and ventilation); Thomas A. Murphy Co. (plumbing)

Tenants
- Le Moyne Dolphins men's basketball, women's basketball and women's volleyball

The Le Moyne Events Center is a multi-purpose arena in DeWitt, New York, United States, that serves as the home arena for the Le Moyne Dolphins women's basketball and volleyball, and men's basketball teams on the campus of Le Moyne College. The venue is sometimes identified as the Event Center.

At halftime of Le Moyne men's basketball game against Daemen on November 30, 1999, the hardwood playing surface within the Events Center was named Ted Grant Court in honor of G. Edward Grant, a member of Le Moyne's inaugural class of 1951, who had recently contributed $250,000 to a Le Moyne athletics fundraising campaign. Grant served as a trustee of Le Moyne College from 1981 to 1987, and was a long-term financial supporter of the athletics program. As a student-athlete at Le Moyne, Grant lettered in track and boxing. Le Moyne's turf field is also named in his honor.

== Construction and renovation ==
The initial proposal for the construction of a field house on Le Moyne's campus was floated in 1959. A fundraising drive for construction of new buildings on campus was organized in early 1960. As of spring 1960, nine new structures were planned with a total capital budget of $3.325 million. By fall 1960, plans for a 3,000-seat gymnasium were being formulated with construction expected to begin in spring 1961. The estimated cost of building the gym was $775,000.

In February 1961, final plans for the field house were announced with ground breaking scheduled to take place the following month. The design of the building included a 22,500-square-foot gymnasium along with a spacious lobby for spectators. The maximum seating capacity for basketball was to be 3,000, when portable bleachers were employed. The building was designed to be used as a home arena for intercollegiate sports as well as for intramural sports for both men and women. A press box designed to accommodate journalists as well as radio and television coverage of events in the building was included in the plan. Part of the building was to be set aside for athletic department administration offices. Showers and men's locker rooms for both home and visiting teams would be easily accessible from the court within the building as well as the outdoor baseball and football/soccer fields. A women's lounge and offices for female faculty were to be located on another side of the building. Courts for playing badminton, tennis, handball and squash were to be included along with an eight-lane bowling alley with automatic pin-setting equipment. The steel-frame building with masonry and translucent plastic exterior walls was designed by the architectural firm of Pederson, Hueber, and Hares. The landscape architectural work was done by James E. Glavin. The cost of the building was expected to be $800,000. The building was expected to open with the varsity basketball team playing the Providence Friars on February 5, 1962. The basketball court was intentionally placed on one end of the building rather than in the center, which reduced the capacity by about 2,000 seats, to ensure other activities could be conducted within the building while the basketball court was in use.

In March 1961, Le Moyne hired Dygert Construction Co., Inc. as the general contractor for the building project after the opening of sealed bids. Edward Joy Co. was engaged to perform the electrical, heating and ventilation work, and the Thomas A. Murphy Co. was hired for plumbing.

On October 31, 1961, Bishop Walter A. Foery of Syracuse officiated a ceremony to mark the laying of the cornerstone. Several items were placed inside a cornerstone box. These included a small crucifix, a copy of President Kennedy's message on physical fitness, a copy of the October 31, 1961 issue of The Post-Standard, a Le Moyne College catalog, a Le Moyne student handbook, a Le Moyne Dolphins basketball brochure, news releases and data on the building and its construction, photographs of the Le Moyne track and basketball teams, an intramural trophy and a perpetual basketball pass good forever to the finder.

When Le Moyne released its basketball schedule for the 1961–62 season, in October 1961, it was expected that the Events Center would be ready to open for the February 5 game against Providence. However, the following month, it appeared the building would not be completed in time. The last piece of steel for the structure went up three months later than scheduled. It appeared the building was six weeks away from getting heat, which was needed before the basketball court could be installed to prevent warping of the wood. The delays could not be overcome, and the Providence game was played at the West Jefferson Street Armory.

By September 1962, construction of the building was completed with the final price tag coming in at $1 million. Initially, it was referred to as the Le Moyne Athletic Center. A dedication ceremony officially marking the opening of the facility was held on September 16, 1962. The building was given the name Anthony A. Henninger Athletic Center by early 1973, and often called the Henninger Athletic Center.

An addition to the original building was constructed in 1989, at a cost of $4 million. The addition was to house a swimming pool, a gymnasium, racquetball courts, an elevated running track, a fitness room, locker rooms and athletic department offices. Le Moyne students were the intended primary users of the new facilities, and intercollegiate sports would continue to be played in the older gym, except should Le Moyne form a swim team in the future.

In April 2000, Le Moyne vice-president of student life Michael Yost announced the school was in the process of hiring an architect to draw up plans for needed renovations. Updates to the coaches' offices, locker rooms and team rooms were desired. The athletic director and sports information director offices were to be converted for team use. A storage shed was to be added to the back of the building for heavy equipment. Women's locker rooms, the administrative wing, equipment room and training room were to be expanded and updated. There were also plans to update Le Moyne's outdoor playing surface. Yost said it would take a year to fundraise for the project and another year to complete it.

The design of Ted Grant Court was updated in July 2008. The new Le Moyne athletics logo, released in May 2008, was added to center court. The baselines were widened with the color fading from black to green. The words "Grant Court" were added to each side of the midcourt line, and the Northeast-10 Conference logo was added to each three-second lane. Since the NCAA men's basketball three-point distance was moved back for the 2008–09 season, a new arc was added at each end of the floor.

During the summer of 2009, a new roof was installed on the athletics center, and the locker rooms for Le Moyne's women's teams and visiting teams were renovated.

The arena underwent a significant renovation in 2016, and reopened on October 12 of that year with an afternoon ceremony and blessing. Later that night, Le Moyne's women's volleyball team won the first event contested at the renovated venue, a 3–2 victory over Roberts Wesleyan.

== First intercollegiate contest ==
The first varsity intercollegiate contest in the arena was the Dolphins men's basketball team's season opener against their archrival and conference opponent, Siena, on December 1, 1962. A crowd of 2,100 witnessed the return of former Le Moyne moderator of athletics, Rev. Vincent B. Ryan, S.J., who was on hand to throw out the first ball in a pre-game ceremony. Jim McGrath, who finished with a game-high 19 points, hit a jump shot to give Le Moyne a 2–0 lead and score the first points in a varsity game in the new arena. The Dolphins' pressure defense, led by Tom Cooney, forced Siena into turnovers and fueled the offense, putting Le Moyne in front, 23–15 at the half.

During the intermission, Rev. John J. O'Brien, S.J., who was the current moderator of athletics, introduced Le Moyne's first team, which played Siena in the program's inaugural game in 1948, former team captains and members of the Dolphins' 1,000 career points club. Former players on hand for the festivities included Don Savage, Lou Donahue, Joe Boehm, Bob Hurley, Dave Lozo, Dick Riley, Patsy Leo, Len Mowins, Dick Kenyon, Ron Mack, Denny Morissey, Dick Lynch, John Caveney and Bill Stanley. Syracuse mayor William Walsh was also present.

When the action resumed, the Indians came out flying, opening the second half with a 10–2 run to erase Le Moyne's lead and tie the game at 25 in only five minutes. Siena extended the run to 18–5 to push ahead, 33–28. Midway through the second half, Dick Myers fouled out, the Dolphins trailed 37–33, and Siena appeared to have the momentum. The Indians answered each of Le Moyne's next two baskets with one of their own and led, 41–37, with 3:14 to play. McGrath drew a foul and hit both free throws to cut Siena's lead to two points. After an empty Indians possession, Chris Pitman was fouled and knocked down both shots to tie the game at 41 with just over two minutes to play. Siena's Paul Thorpe missed a layup inside the 1:50 mark, and Pitman grabbed the rebound. The Dolphins froze the ball, holding for the final shot, until Mickey Flynn's 12-footer from the left side fell through the hoop with five seconds left, giving Le Moyne a 6–0 run and a 43–41 lead. The Indians' final desperation shot was blocked by the Dolphins, sealing the Le Moyne victory. Flynn finished the game with nine points.

The varsity game was the nightcap of a doubleheader that opened with Le Moyne's freshman team defeating Powelson Business Institute, 65–47. Tony McCann led the Dolphin Cubs with 22 points, while Gary DeYulia and Tom Mullen each added 13 points.

== Configurations and seating capacity ==
The 2016 renovation enabled the venue to be used in three different configurations, each with a different maximum seating capacity. Configuration A produces a maximum capacity of 2,637. It includes full chair-back seating on both the north and south sides of the building, portable bleachers on the east side, and chairs assembled on the floor with the stage at the west end of the building. This is the basic configuration used for basketball games, except for the chairs on the court. There is a second set of portable bleachers that can be used at the east end of the building, when there is no stage, such as is the case with basketball games. The seating capacity for basketball reported by Le Moyne to the NCAA is 2,000.

Configuration B produces a maximum capacity of 1,705, using the full chair-back seating on either the north or south side with the stage opposite those seats and additional chairs assembled on the floor.

Configuration C produces a maximum capacity of 685, using seating on either the north or south side with the stage in the middle of the floor.

== Major events ==
The Events Center hosted regional games of the 1965, 1966, 1969 2017 and 2018 NCAA College Division/Division II basketball tournaments.

The 1968 Amateur Athletic Union junior national boxing championships were staged in the arena.

Men's basketball contests of the 1980 Empire State Games were played in the Events Center.

The following entertainers have performed at the Events Center:

- The Smothers Brothers on November 8, 1963.
- The Beach Boys headlined a concert held in the venue on November 18, 1967. Other acts performing included Strawberry Alarm Clock, the Soul Survivors and Buffalo Springfield. The Pickle Brothers provided comedy during the show.
- The Guess Who in October 1970.
- Jackson Browne and Linda Ronstadt on March 6, 1974.
- Harry Chapin, Pete Seeger and David Bromberg on April 7, 1976.
- Orleans on September 17, 1976.
- Dickey Betts, Nils Lofgren and Steve Gibbons on April 14, 1977.
- The J. Geils Band on September 18, 1977.
- Firefall and Bryan Bowers on April 13, 1978.
- Pousette-Dart Band on April 29, 1979.
- Garrett Morris on February 24, 1983.
- John Cafferty and the Beaver Brown Band on October 17, 1984.
- Dennis Miller on March 1, 1990.
- Sweet Honey in the Rock on March 10, 1990.
- Edie Brickell & New Bohemians on November 15, 1990.
- Jim Breuer on April 3, 1997

=== Hillary Clinton campaign speech ===
While campaigning for a United States Senate seat representing New York, Hillary Clinton appeared at the Le Moyne Athletic Center on October 29, 2000. Approximately 1,000 people attended the event and heard Clinton's 33-minute speech. According to John O'Brien, Le Moyne's director of security, Clinton campaign staffers, who were members of the Onondaga Democratic Club, forcibly removed Le Moyne and Syracuse University students identified as Republicans from the venue. O'Brien stated that there were police officers present to provide security, if needed, and the campaign staffers were not authorized to act in the capacity of security officers. He stated that once he clarified security protocols with the campaign, the removals ceased. Bruce Shefrin, an associate professor of political science at Le Moyne, maintained that the publicity surrounding the event was inaccurate. However, one Le Moyne student, Kristin Reif, said, "I was asked to leave. She's the First Lady of the United States, and I can't even see her speak at my school. It's unfortunate." Le Moyne's president, the Rev. Charles Beirne, wrote a letter to the Le Moyne community that said, in part:

Although sympathetic to the candidacy of Mrs. Clinton's opponent, the students were acting in an appropriate way, and they had a clear right to be there. There was no justification for their being asked to leave, and the College regrets that this incident occurred and that the students were subjected to such treatment. These students were rightly indignant, but expressed their reaction to this outrage with respect, despite the way they were handled.

== See also ==
- List of NCAA Division I basketball arenas
