= 2006–07 Marist Red Foxes women's basketball team =

Intercollegiate basketball season

2006–07 Marist Red Foxes women's basketball
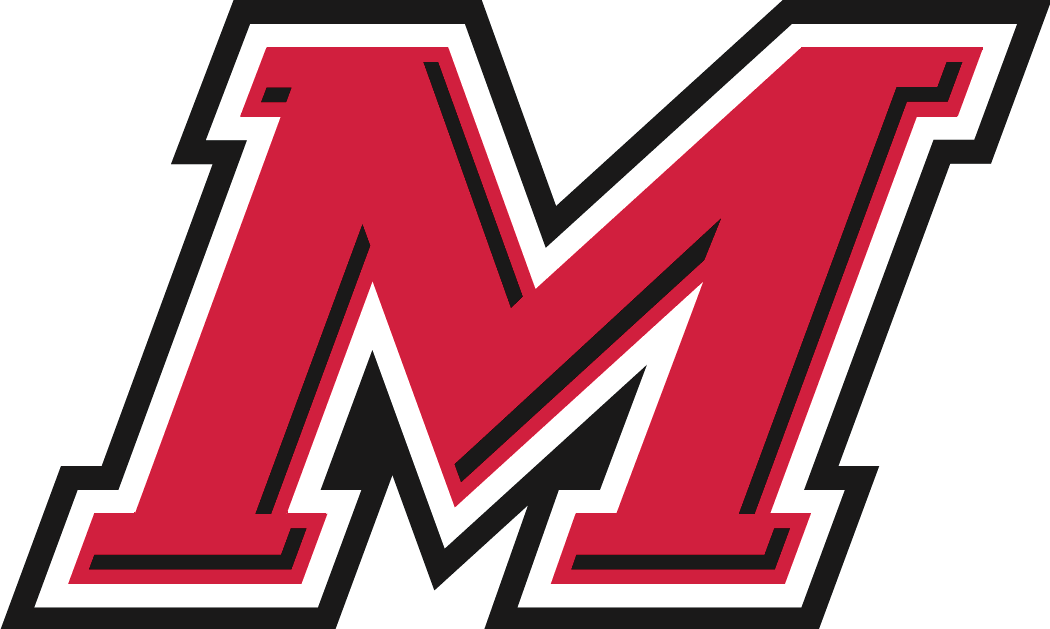

MAAC Regular Season Champions MAAC Tournament Champions

NCAA tournament, Sweet Sixteen
- Conference: Metro Atlantic Athletic Conference

Ranking
- Coaches: No. 22
- Record: 29–6 (17–1 MAAC)
- Head coach: Brian Giorgis (5th season)
- Assistant coaches: Megan Gebbia; Jada Pierce; Erin Leger
- Home arena: McCann Center

2006–07 MAAC women's basketball standings
	Conf.				Overall
Team	W		L	PCT	W		L	PCT
Marist †	17	–	1	.944	29	–	6	.829
Iona	13	–	5	.722	21	–	13	.618
Loyola (MD)	12	–	6	.667	18	–	12	.600
Fairfield	11	–	7	.611	15	–	15	.500
Siena	8	–	10	.444	10	–	20	.333
Canisius	8	–	10	.444	16	–	14	.533
Saint Peter's	7	–	11	.389	12	–	18	.400
Manhattan	7	–	11	.389	11	–	20	.355
Niagara	6	–	12	.333	14	–	16	.467
Rider	1	–	17	.056	2	–	28	.067
† 2007 MAAC tournament winner As of March 26, 2007; Rankings from AP Poll

The 2006–07 Marist Red Foxes women's basketball team represented Marist College during the 2006–07 NCAA Division I women's basketball season. The Red Foxes, led by fifth year head coach Brian Giorgis, played their home games at the McCann Center and were members of the Metro Atlantic Athletic Conference. They finished the season 29–6 overall, 17–1 in MAAC play to finish in first place to win the MAAC regular season title. In the MAAC women's basketball tournament, they defeated No. 8 seed Manhattan in the quarterfinals, No. 5 seed Siena in the semifinals, and No. 2 seed Iona in the championship game to win the tournament, and earned the conference's automatic bid to the NCAA women's tournament. As a No. 13 seed, they upset No. 4 seed and eighth-ranked Ohio State 67–63 in the First Round, upset No. 5 seed and 17th ranked Middle Tennessee State 73–59 in the Second Round before falling to No. 1 seed, and 3rd ranked Tennessee, 46–65 in the Sweet Sixteen.

== Preview ==
Since Brian Giorgis took over the head coaching position at Marist four years prior, the Red Foxes compiled a record of 78–41 overall, and 52–20 in MAAC play. In those four seasons, Marist has won the MAAC regular season crown three times, and been to the NCAA Tournament twice. The team returned first team All-MAAC selection Meg Dahlman, third team All-MAAC selection, and MAAC defensive player of the year, Alisa Kresge, and MAAC All-Rookie team selection Julianne Vianni. Despite this, Iona was the preseason favorite to win it all, while Marist was picked second.

== Roster ==
2006–07 Marist Red Foxes women's basketball team
Players
Coaches

Pos.	#	Name	Height	Year	Previous school	Hometown
G	1	Shannon Minter	5 ft 7 in (1.7 m)	Sr	Ossining	Ossining, NY
G	2	Alisa Kresge	5 ft 7 in (1.7 m)	Sr	Red Bank Catholic	Holmdel, NJ
G	3	Julianne Viani	5 ft 7 in (1.7 m)	RS So	Our Lady of Lourdes	Poughkeepsie, NY
G	11	Brittany Engle	5 ft 9 in (1.75 m)	Fr	Oliver Ames	South Easton, MA
F	12	Rachele Fitz	6 ft 0 in (1.83 m)	Fr	Trinity	Seven Hills, OH
F/C	14	Meg Dahlman	6 ft 3 in (1.91 m)	RS Jr	Holy Cross	Spencerport, NY
G	22	Nikki Flores	5 ft 4 in (1.63 m)	Jr	Immaculate Heart Academy	Montvale, NJ
F	23	Kristin Hein	6 ft 0 in (1.83 m)	Sr	Manasquan	Howell, NJ
G/F	24	Alexis Waters	5 ft 9 in (1.75 m)	Jr	Lansing Sexton	Lansing, MI
G/F	31	Lynzee Johnson	5 ft 10 in (1.78 m)	Fr	Bellbrook	Bellbrook, OH
G	33	Courtney Kolesar	5 ft 7 in (1.7 m)	Jr	Painesville-Riverside	Concord, OH
F/C	44	Mary Alice Duff	6 ft 2 in (1.88 m)	Sr	Haverford	Havertown, PA
F	50	Sarah Smrdel	6 ft 2 in (1.88 m)	Jr	Mentor	Mentor, OH

Head coach

- Brian Giorgis (SUNY Cortland)

Assistant coach(es)

- Megan Gebbia (Towson)
- Jada Pierce (West Chester)
- Erin Leger (Marist)

Legend

- (C) Team captain
- (S) Suspended
- (I) Ineligible
- (W) Walk-on
- Injured
- Current redshirt

Roster
Last update: March 5, 2007

== Schedule ==
Date time, TV	Rank^{#}	Opponent^{#}	Result	Record	Site (attendance) city, state
Regular Season
Nov 10, 2006*; 7:00 p.m.		Stony Brook	W 82–72	1–0	McCann Center (1,465); Poughkeepsie, NY
Nov 17, 2006*; 7:00 p.m.		at No. 6 Duke	L 50–71	1–1	Cameron Indoor Stadium (4,465); Durham, NC
Nov 19, 2006*; 2:00 p.m.		at Villanova	L 64–69 ^{OT}	1–2	The Pavilion (519); Villanova, PA
Nov 22, 2006*; 2:00 p.m.		Dartmouth	W 77–41	2–2	McCann Center (1,114); Poughkeepsie, NY
Nov 26, 2006*; 2:00 p.m.		Fordham	W 88–38	3–2	McCann Center (1,274); Poughkeepsie, NY
Nov 28, 2006*; 7:00 p.m.		at Brown	W 71–53	4–2	Pizzitola Sports Center (171); Providence, RI
Dec 2, 2006*; 3:30 p.m.		at Bucknell	W 57–38	5–2	Sojka Pavilion (323); Lewisburg, PA
Dec 8, 2006; 5:00 p.m.		Loyola (MD)	W 60–50	6–2 (1–0)	McCann Center (1,662); Poughkeepsie, NY
Dec 10, 2006; 2:00 p.m.		Manhattan	W 70–30	7–2 (2–0)	McCann Center (1,471); Poughkeepsie, NY
Dec 18, 2006*; 7:00 p.m.		at Harvard	W 74–68	8–2	Lavietes Pavilion (152); Cambridge, MA
Dec 22, 2006*; 7:00 p.m.		at Yale	L 52–67	8–3	Payne Whitney Gymnasium (311); New Haven, CT
Dec 29, 2006*; 3:30 p.m.		vs. Liberty; Terrapin Classic	W 76–43	9–3	Comcast Center; College Park, MD
Dec 30, 2006*; 6:00 p.m.		at No. 1 Maryland; Terrapin Classic	L 60–86	9–4	Comcast Center (7,322); College Park, MD
Jan 6, 2007; 1:30 p.m.		at Fairfield	W 74–52	10–4 (3–0)	Alumni Hall (1,102); Fairfield, CT
Jan 8, 2007; 7:00 p.m.		at Rider	W 84–59	11–4 (4–0)	Alumni Gymnasium (243); Lawrenceville, NJ
Jan 12, 2007; 12:00 p.m.		at Canisius	W 63–54	12–4 (5–0)	Koessler Center (1,351); Buffalo, NY
Jan 14, 2007; 2:00 p.m.		at Niagara	W 65–52	13–4 (6–0)	Gallagher Center (409); Lewiston, NY
Jan 19, 2007; 7:00 p.m.		Saint Peter's	W 73–34	14–4 (7–0)	McCann Center (1,916); Poughkeepsie, NY
Jan 21, 2007; 2:00 p.m.		Iona	W 70–49	15–4 (8–0)	McCann Center (2,163); Poughkeepsie, NY
Jan 26, 2007; 5:00 p.m.		Siena	W 58–46	16–4 (9–0)	McCann Center (1,659); Poughkeepsie, NY
Jan 28, 2007; 2:00 p.m.		Niagara	W 80–59	17–4 (10–0)	McCann Center (1,411); Poughkeepsie, NY
Feb 2, 2007; 7:00 p.m.		at Saint Peter's	W 69–58	18–4 (11–0)	Yanitelli Center (381); Jersey City, NJ
Feb 4, 2007; 2:00 p.m.		at Manhattan	W 71–51	19–4 (12–0)	Draddy Gymnasium (370); Riverdale, NY
Feb 9, 2007; 7:30 p.m.		Canisius	W 66–50	20–4 (13–0)	McCann Center (2,229); Poughkeepsie, NY
Feb 11, 2007; 2:00 p.m.		at Siena	W 68–47	21–4 (14–0)	Alumni Recreation Center (1,324); Loudonville, NY
Feb 16, 2007; 7:00 p.m.		at Loyola (MD)	L 55–62	21–5 (14–1)	Reitz Arena (322); Baltimore, MD
Feb 19, 2007; 7:00 p.m.		Rider	W 75–57	22–5 (15–1)	McCann Center (1,823); Poughkeepsie, NY
Feb 23, 2007; 4:30 p.m.		at Iona	W 59–51	23–5 (16–1)	Hynes Athletic Center (768); New Rochelle, NY
Feb 25, 2007; 2:00 p.m.		Fairfield	W 72–53	24–5 (17–1)	McCann Center (1,900); Poughkeepsie, NY
MAAC Women's Tournament
Mar 2, 2007; 1:30 p.m.	(1)	vs. (8) Manhattan; Quarterfinals	W 55–42	25–5	Arena at Harbor Yard; Bridgeport, CT
Mar 3, 2007; 11:30 a.m.	(1)	vs. (5) Siena; Semifinals	W 71–59	26–5	Arena at Harbor Yard (1,602); Bridgeport, CT
Mar 4, 2007; 2:00 p.m.	(1)	vs. (2) Iona; Championship	W 64–57 ^{OT}	27–5	Arena at Harbor Yard (2,007); Bridgeport, CT
NCAA tournament
Mar 17, 2007; 10:00 p.m.	(13 DAY)	vs. (4 DAY) No. 8 Ohio State; First Round	W 67–63	28–5	Maples Pavilion; Stanford, CA
Mar 4, 2007; 8:00 p.m.	(13 DAY)	vs. (5 DAY) No. 17 Middle Tennessee State; Second Round	W 73–59	29–5	Maples Pavilion (3,917); Stanford, CA
Mar 25, 2007; 12:00 p.m.	(13 DAY)	vs. (1 DAY) No. 3 Tennessee; Sweet Sixteen	L 46–65	29–6	UD Arena; Dayton, OH
*Non-conference game. ^{#}Rankings from AP Poll. (#) Tournament seedings in parentheses. DAY=Dayton. All times are in Eastern Time.

== See also ==
- 2006–07 Marist Red Foxes men's basketball team
