= 2008–09 Marist Red Foxes women's basketball team =

Intercollegiate basketball season

2008–09 Marist Red Foxes women's basketball
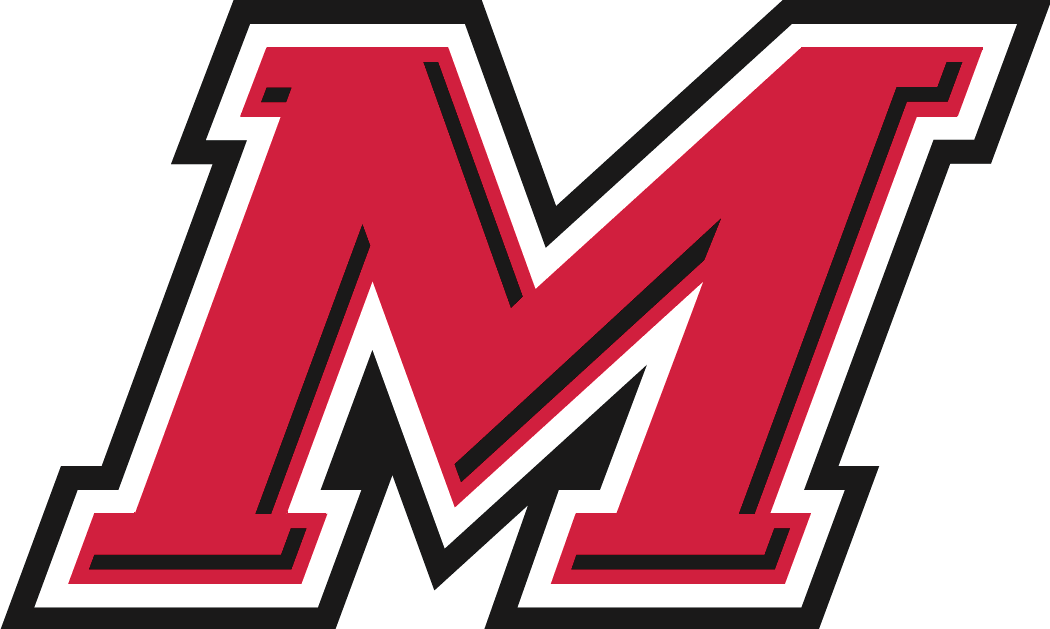

MAAC Regular Season Champions MAAC Tournament Champions

2009 NCAA Tournament, first round
- Conference: Metro Atlantic Athletic Conference
- Record: 29–4 (16–2 MAAC)
- Head coach: Brian Giorgis (7th season)
- Assistant coaches: Megan Gebbia; Erin Leger; Keila Whittington
- Home arena: McCann Center

2008–09 MAAC women's basketball standings
	Conf.				Overall
Team	W		L	PCT	W		L	PCT
Marist †	16	–	2	.889	29	–	4	.879
Canisius	14	–	4	.778	24	–	9	.727
Fairfield	12	–	6	.667	18	–	13	.581
Saint Peter's	10	–	8	.556	13	–	15	.464
Iona	10	–	8	.556	18	–	13	.581
Siena	9	–	9	.500	10	–	18	.357
Manhattan	7	–	11	.389	10	–	20	.333
Rider	7	–	11	.389	10	–	20	.333
Loyola (MD)	4	–	14	.222	10	–	20	.333
Niagara	1	–	17	.056	3	–	28	.097
† 2009 MAAC tournament winner As of March 26, 2009; Rankings from AP Poll

The 2008–09 Marist Red Foxes women's basketball team represented Marist College during the 2008–09 NCAA Division I women's basketball season. The Red Foxes, led by seventh year head coach Brian Giorgis, play their home games at the McCann Center and were members of the Metro Atlantic Athletic Conference. They finished the season 29–4, 16–2 in MAAC play to finish in first place and win the MAAC regular season title for the sixth consecutive time. In the MAAC women's basketball tournament, they defeated #9 seed Loyola (MD) in the quarterfinals, #5 seed Iona in the semifinals, and #2 seed Canisius in the championship game to earn the conference's automatic bid to the NCAA women's tournament. It was their fourth consecutive MAAC Tournament championship. As a #12 seed, they were defeated by #5 seed Virginia 61–68 in the First Round.

== Roster ==
2008–09 Marist Red Foxes women's basketball team
Players
Coaches

Pos.	#	Name	Height	Year	Previous school	Hometown
G	0	Katheryn Lyons	5 ft 10 in (1.78 m)	RS Fr	Bishop McGuinness	Kernersville, NC
G	3	Julianne Viani	5 ft 7 in (1.7 m)	RS Sr	Our Lady of Lourdes	Poughkeepsie, NY
G	5	Elise Caron	5 ft 5 in (1.65 m)	So	Cégep Édouard-Montpetit	Quebec, Canada
G	10	Erica Allenspach	5 ft 8 in (1.73 m)	So	Miamisburg	Miamisburg, OH
G	11	Brittany Engle	5 ft 9 in (1.75 m)	Jr	Oliver Ames	South Easton, MA
F	12	Rachele Fitz	6 ft 0 in (1.83 m)	Jr	Trinity	Seven Hills, OH
F	20	Emily Stallings	6 ft 0 in (1.83 m)	Fr	John S. Burke	Newburgh, NY
C	21	Maria Laterza	6 ft 3 in (1.91 m)	So	Bishop Kearney	Brooklyn, NY
G	22	Kristine Best	5 ft 4 in (1.63 m)	Fr	St. Anthony	Commack, NY
G	24	Corielle Yard	5 ft 8 in (1.73 m)	Fr	Schuylkill Valley	Reading, PA
G/F	31	Lynzee Johnson	5 ft 10 in (1.78 m)	Jr	Bellbrook	Bellbrook, OH
G	33	Courtney Kolesar	5 ft 8 in (1.73 m)	RS Sr	Painesville-Riverside	Concord, OH
F	34	Brandy Gang	6 ft 2 in (1.88 m)	Fr	Lake	Hartville, OH
F	42	Sarah Huff	6 ft 3 in (1.91 m)	So	Canal Winchester	Canal Winchester, OH

Head coach

- Brian Giorgis (SUNY Cortland)

Assistant coach(es)

- Megan Gebbia (Towson)
- Erin Leger (Marist)
- Keila Whittington (Dillard)

Legend

- (C) Team captain
- (S) Suspended
- (I) Ineligible
- (W) Walk-on
- Injured
- Current redshirt

Roster
Last update: March 5, 2009

== Schedule ==
Date time, TV	Rank^{#}	Opponent^{#}	Result	Record	Site (attendance) city, state
Regular Season
Nov 16, 2008*; 4:00 p.m.		Albany	W 74–56	1–0	McCann Center (2,149); Poughkeepsie, NY
Nov 21, 2008*; 7:00 p.m.		at Northeastern	W 93–65	2–0	Solomon Court (185); Boston, MA
Nov 23, 2008*; 2:00 p.m.		at Harvard	W 76–63	3–0	Lavietes Pavilion (351); Cambridge, MA
Nov 26, 2008*; 8:00 p.m.		at No. 4 Oklahoma	L 57–83	3–1	Leede Arena (7,063); Norman, OK
Nov 28, 2008*; 8:00 p.m.		vs. Tulsa	W 73–53	4–1	Reynolds Center (1,130); Tulsa, OK
Dec 1, 2008*; 7:30 p.m.		Lafayette	W 66–55	5–1	McCann Center (1,574); Poughkeepsie, NY
Dec 5, 2008; 7:00 p.m.		at Niagara	W 60–38	6–1 (1–0)	Gallagher Center (432); Lewiston, NY
Dec 7, 2008; 2:00 p.m.		at Canisius	W 70–52	7–1 (2–0)	Koessler Athletic Center (608); Buffalo, NY
Dec 13, 2008*; 2:00 p.m.		Boston University	W 73–62	8–1	McCann Center (2,008); Poughkeepsie, NY
Dec 20, 2008*; 2:00 p.m.		St. Bonaventure	W 48–45	9–1	McCann Center (1,655); Poughkeepsie, NY
Dec 29, 2008*; 1:00 p.m.		vs. East Carolina; FIU Sun & Fun Classic	W 62–58	10–1	U.S. Century Bank Arena (158); Miami, FL
Dec 30, 2008*; 7:00 p.m.		vs. Georgia Southern; FIU Sun & Fun Classic	W 60–45	11–1	U.S. Century Bank Arena (207); Miami, FL
Jan 4, 2009; 1:00 p.m.		at Rider	W 69–45	12–1 (3–0)	Alumni Gymnasium (1,111); Lawrenceville, NJ
Jan 6, 2009; 7:30 p.m.	No. 25	Iona	W 81–58	13–1 (4–0)	McCann Center (1,750); Poughkeepsie, NY
Jan 9, 2009; 7:30 p.m.	No. 25	Niagara	W 98–51	14–1 (5–0)	McCann Center (1,975); Poughkeepsie, NY
Jan 11, 2009; 7:00 p.m.	No. 25	at Loyola (MD)	W 86–44	15–1 (6–0)	Reitz Arena (582); Baltimore, MD
Jan 16, 2009; 7:00 p.m.	No. 21	Saint Peter's	W 78–58	16–1 (7–0)	McCann Center (2,088); Poughkeepsie, NY
Jan 18, 2009; 2:00 p.m.	No. 21	at Siena	W 65–55	17–1 (8–0)	Alumni Recreation Center (904); Loudonville, NY
Jan 23, 2009; 4:30 p.m.	No. 20	Fairfield	L 65–73	17–2 (8–1)	McCann Center (2,205); Poughkeepsie, NY
Jan 25, 2009; 12:00 p.m.	No. 20	at Saint Peter's	W 71–58	18–2 (9–1)	Yanitelli Center (412); Jersey City, NJ
Jan 30, 2009; 7:00 p.m.		Manhattan	W 70–44	19–2 (10–1)	McCann Center (2,606); Poughkeepsie, NY
Feb 1, 2009; 2:00 p.m.		at Iona	W 69–60	20–2 (11–1)	Hynes Athletic Center (944); New Rochelle, NY
Feb 6, 2009; 7:00 p.m.		Canisius	L 60–68	20–3 (11–2)	McCann Center (3,200); Poughkeepsie, NY
Feb 8, 2009; 7:00 p.m.		Loyola (MD)	W 86–53	21–3 (12–2)	McCann Center (2,553); Poughkeepsie, NY
Feb 12, 2009; 7:00 p.m.		at Fairfield	W 64–52	22–3 (13–2)	Alumni Hall (711); Fairfield, CT
Feb 15, 2009*; 1:00 p.m.		at Hartford	W 78–73 ^{OT}	23–3	Chase Arena (3,217); West Hartford, CT
Feb 19, 2009; 7:00 p.m.		at Manhattan	W 91–82	24–3 (14–2)	Draddy Gymnasium (1,023); Riverdale, NY
Feb 22, 2009; 2:00 p.m.		Siena	W 78–49	25–3 (15–2)	McCann Center (2,980); Poughkeepsie, NY
Feb 28, 2009; 7:30 p.m.		Rider	W 81–56	26–3 (16–2)	McCann Center (2,828); Poughkeepsie, NY
MAAC Women's Tournament
Mar 6, 2009; 1:30 p.m.	(1)	vs. (9) Loyola (MD); Quarterfinals	W 81–27	27–3	Times Union Center; Albany, NY
Mar 7, 2009; 11:30 a.m.	(1)	vs. (5) Iona; Semifinals	W 76–69	28–3	Times Union Center (3,700); Albany, NY
Mar 8, 2009; 12:00 p.m.	(1)	vs. (2) Canisius; Championship	W 78–63	29–3	Times Union Center (3,882); Albany, NY
NCAA tournament
Mar 21, 2009; 10:30 p.m.	(12)	vs. (5) No. 24 Virginia; First Round	L 61–68	29–4	Galen Center (1,292); Los Angeles, CA
*Non-conference game. ^{#}Rankings from AP Poll. (#) Tournament seedings in parentheses. All times are in Eastern Time.
