= 2018–19 Marist Red Foxes women's basketball team =

Intercollegiate basketball season

2018–19 Marist Red Foxes women's basketball
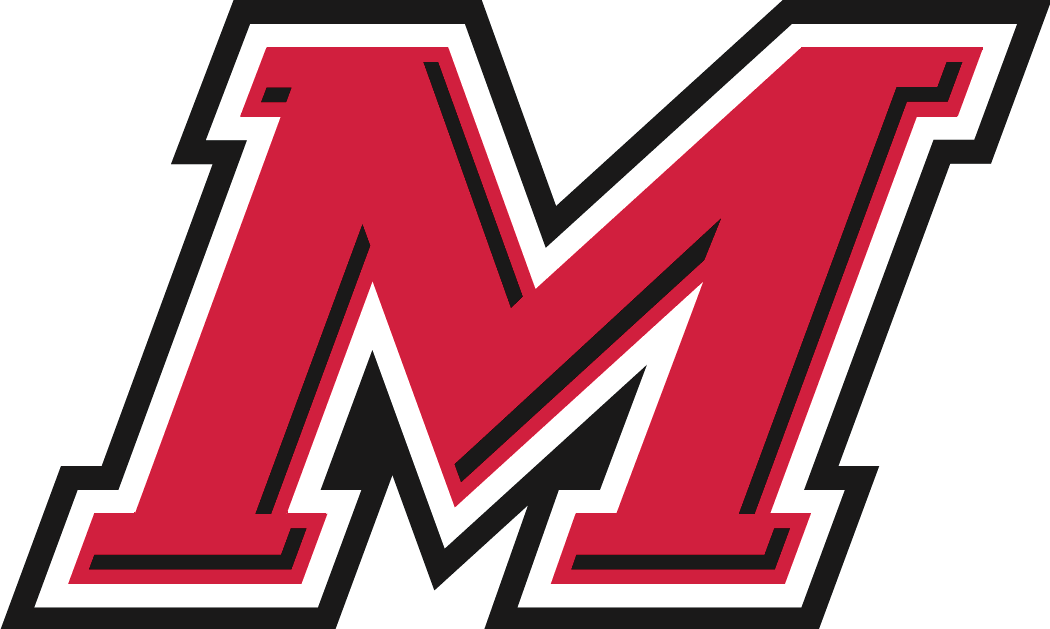
- Conference: Metro Atlantic Athletic Conference
- Record: 23–10 (13–5 MAAC)
- Head coach: Brian Giorgis (17th season)
- Assistant coaches: Erin Doughty; Maggie Gallagher; Keila Whittington
- Home arena: McCann Arena

2018–19 MAAC women's basketball standings
	Conf.				Overall
Team	W		L	PCT	W		L	PCT
Quinnipiac †	18	–	0	1.000	26	–	7	.788
Rider	14	–	4	.778	19	–	13	.594
Marist	13	–	5	.722	23	–	10	.697
Monmouth	9	–	9	.500	14	–	17	.452
Canisius	9	–	9	.500	11	–	19	.367
Manhattan	9	–	9	.500	12	–	19	.387
Siena	8	–	10	.444	12	–	18	.400
Niagara	8	–	10	.444	12	–	19	.387
Fairfield	7	–	11	.389	11	–	20	.355
Iona	3	–	15	.167	5	–	26	.161
Saint Peter's	1	–	17	.056	6	–	24	.200
† 2019 MAAC tournament winner As of March 23, 2019; Rankings from AP poll

The 2018–19 Marist Red Foxes women's basketball team represented Marist College during the 2018–19 NCAA Division I women's basketball season. The Red Foxes were led by 17th-year head coach Brian Giorgis, and played their home games at the McCann Arena in Poughkeepsie, New York as members of the Metro Atlantic Athletic Conference (MAAC). They finished the regular season 23–10 overall, 13–5 in MAAC play, to finish in third place. As a No. 3 seed in the 2019 MAAC tournament, they advanced to the championship game and were defeated by No. 1 seed Quinnipiac 51–81.

== Previous season ==
The Red Foxes finished the 2017–18 season 20–14, 14–4 in MAAC play, to finish in second place. As the No. 2 seed at the MAAC tournament, they defeated No. 7 seed Manhattan and No. 3 seed Siena to advance to the championship game, where they lost to top-seeded Quinnipiac. They were invited to the 2018 Women's National Invitation Tournament where they lost in the first round at St. John's 47–68.

== Roster ==
2018–19 Marist Red Foxes women's basketball team
Players
Coaches

Pos.	#	Name	Height	Year	Previous school	Hometown
G	0	Grace Vander Weide	5 ft 11 in (1.8 m)	RS Jr	Valley High; Missouri State	West Des Moines, IA
G	1	Claire Oberdorf	5 ft 6 in (1.68 m)	Jr	Greensburg Salem	Greensburg, PA
G	2	Allie Best	5 ft 8 in (1.73 m)	So	Voorhees	Glen Gardner, NJ
F	3	Alana Gilmer	6 ft 0 in (1.83 m)	RS Jr	Archbishop Williams; Virginia Tech	North Easton, MA
G	4	Allie Clement (C)	5 ft 8 in (1.73 m)	RS Sr	Catherine McAuley	Falmouth, ME
F	5	Lovísa Henningsdóttir	6 ft 2 in (1.88 m)	Sr	The Rock of Gainesville	Hafnarfjörður, Iceland
G	10	Maura Fitzpatrick	5 ft 11 in (1.8 m)	Sr	Mercy	Cheshire, CT
G	20	Hannah Hand	5 ft 9 in (1.75 m)	Jr	Liberty Christian School	Argyle, TX
F	21	Willow Duffell	6 ft 2 in (1.88 m)	So	Monroe Woodbury	Harriman, NY
G	23	Rebekah Hand	5 ft 10 in (1.78 m)	Jr	Liberty Christian School	Argyle, TX
G	24	Sarah Barcello	5 ft 11 in (1.8 m)	Fr	Seton Catholic Prep	Chandler, AZ
F	31	Molly Smith	6 ft 1 in (1.85 m)	RS So	Holy Family Catholic	Shorewood, MN
G	33	Kendall Krick	5 ft 8 in (1.73 m)	Fr	Seton Catholic Prep	Chandler, AZ

Head coach

- Brian Giorgis (SUNY Cortland)

Assistant coach(es)

- Erin Doughty (Marist)
- Maggie Gallagher (Marist)
- Keila Whittington (Dillard)

Legend

- (C) Team captain
- (S) Suspended
- (I) Ineligible
- (W) Walk-on
- Injured
- Current redshirt

Roster
Last update: March 31, 2025

== Schedule ==
Date time, TV	Rank^{#}	Opponent^{#}	Result	Record	Site (attendance) city, state
Non-conference regular season
November 10, 2018*; 2:00 p.m.		at Navy	W 72–48	1–0	Alumni Hall (439); Annapolis, MD
November 16, 2018*; 2:00 p.m., ESPN+		Boston University	W 68–57	2–0	McCann Arena (1,516); Poughkeepsie, NY
November 18, 2018*; 2:00 p.m., ESPN+		Temple	W 74–68	3–0	McCann Arena (1,526); Poughkeepsie, NY
November 23, 2018*; 1:00 p.m.		vs. Stetson; Challenge in Music City	W 76–69	4–0	Nashville Municipal Auditorium (150); Nashville, TN
November 24, 2018*; 3:30 p.m.		vs. Hofstra; Challenge in Music City	W 71–57	5–0	Nashville Municipal Auditorium; Nashville, TN
November 25, 2018*; 3:30 p.m.		vs. Wright State; Challenge in Music City	L 60–76	5–1	Nashville Municipal Auditorium; Nashville, TN
November 30, 2018*; 7:00 p.m.		at Elon	W 61–57	6–1	Schar Center (413); Elon, NC
December 2, 2018*; 2:00 p.m.		at Duke	L 56–64	6–2	Cameron Indoor Stadium (2,923); Durham, NC
December 8, 2018*; 2:00 p.m.		at Albany	W 74–56	7–2	SEFCU Arena (996); Albany, NY
December 15, 2018*; 5:00 p.m., ESPN+		at Princeton	L 57–60	7–3	Jadwin Gymnasium (680); Princeton, NJ
December 18, 2018*; 7:00 p.m., ESPN+		Northeastern	W 90–84	8–3	McCann Arena (1,233); Poughkeepsie, NY
December 29, 2018*; 2:00 p.m., ESPN+		UMass	L 55–70	8–4	McCann Arena (1,789); Poughkeepsie, NY
MAAC regular season
January 3, 2019; 7:00 p.m.		at Niagara	W 87–58	9–4 (1–0)	Gallagher Center (313); Lewiston, NY
January 5, 2019; 2:00 p.m., ESPN3		at Canisius	W 71–66	10–4 (2–0)	Koessler Athletic Center (651); Buffalo, NY
January 10, 2019; 12:00 p.m., ESPNU		Quinnipiac	L 69–76	10–5 (2–1)	McCann Arena (1,514); Poughkeepsie, NY
January 12, 2019; 2:00 p.m., ESPN3		at Fairfield	W 56–46	11–5 (3–1)	Alumni Hall (503); Fairfield, CT
January 15, 2019; 7:00 p.m., ESPN3		Monmouth	W 69–45	12–5 (4–1)	McCann Arena (1,233); Poughkeepsie, NY
January 17, 2019; 7:00 p.m., ESPN3		Siena	W 88–59	13–5 (5–1)	McCann Arena (1,338); Poughkeepsie, NY
January 21, 2019; 7:00 p.m., ESPN+		Iona	W 76–36	14–5 (6–1)	McCann Arena (1,403); Poughkeepsie, NY
January 25, 2019; 7:00 p.m.		at Saint Peter's	W 62–42	15–5 (7–1)	Yanitelli Center (350); Jersey City, NJ
January 27, 2019; 2:00 p.m., ESPN3		Manhattan	L 51–69	15–6 (7–2)	McCann Arena (1,665); Poughkeepsie, NY
January 30, 2019; 7:00 p.m., ESPN+		Rider	L 58–68	15–7 (7–3)	McCann Arena (1,302); Poughkeepsie, NY
February 1, 2019; 7:00 p.m.		at Siena	W 73–58	16–7 (8–3)	Alumni Recreation Center (952); Loudonville, NY
February 7, 2019; 7:00 p.m.		at Manhattan	W 62–51	17–7 (9–3)	Draddy Gymnasium (423); Riverdale, NY
February 9, 2019; 2:00 p.m., ESPN3		at Rider	L 64–70	17–8 (9–4)	Alumni Gymnasium (649); Lawrenceville, NJ
February 16, 2019; 7:00 p.m., ESPN3		Canisius	W 66–50	18–8 (10–4)	McCann Arena (1,777); Poughkeepsie, NY
February 19, 2019; 7:00 p.m., ESPN+		Fairfield	W 85–44	19–8 (11–4)	McCann Arena (1,286); Poughkeepsie, NY
February 23, 2019; 2:00 p.m., ESPN+		at Quinnipiac	L 66-78	19–9 (11–5)	People's United Center (1,102); Hamden, CT
February 28, 2019; 7:00 p.m., ESPN+		at Monmouth	W 69–45	20–9 (12–5)	OceanFirst Bank Center; West Long Branch, NJ
March 2, 2019; 7:00 p.m., ESPN3		Niagara	W 82–69	21–9 (13–5)	McCann Arena; Poughkeepsie, NY
MAAC women's tournament
March 9, 2019; 12:00 p.m., ESPN3	(3)	vs. (6) Manhattan; Quarterfinals	W 65–51	22–9	Times Union Center; Albany, NY
March 10, 2019; 1:30 p.m., ESPN3	(3)	vs. (2) Rider; Semifinals	W 62–52	23–9	Times Union Center; Albany, NY
March 11, 2019; 2:30 p.m., ESPNU	(3)	vs. (1) Quinnipiac; Championship	L 51–81	23–10	Times Union Center; Albany, NY
*Non-conference game. ^{#}Rankings from AP poll. (#) Tournament seedings in parentheses. All times are in Eastern.

== See also ==
- 2018–19 Marist Red Foxes men's basketball team
