= 2017–18 Marist Red Foxes women's basketball team =

Intercollegiate basketball season

2017–18 Marist Red Foxes women's basketball
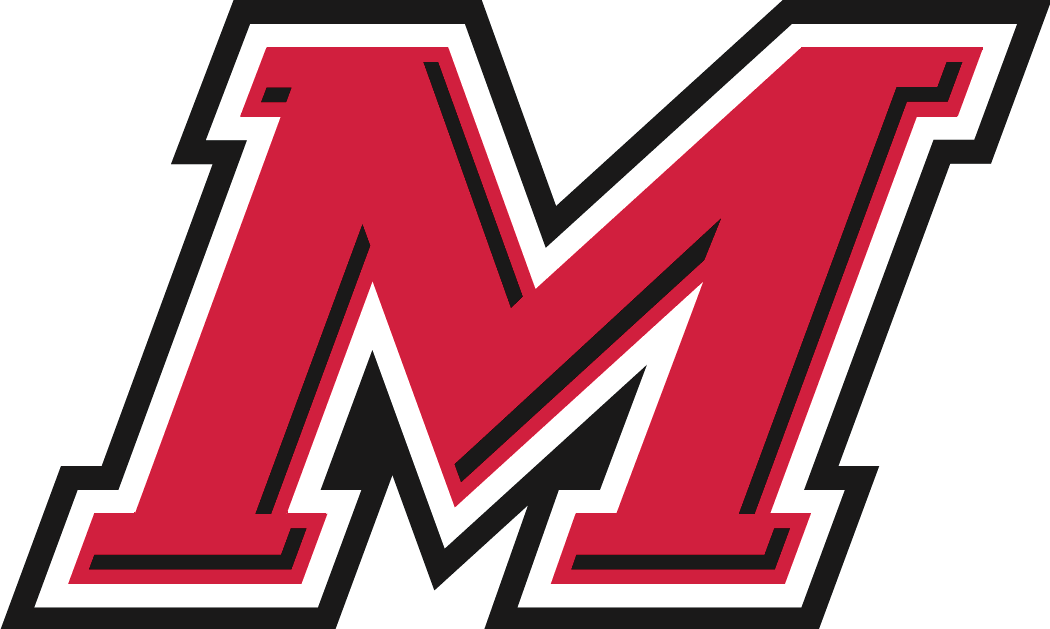

WNIT, First Round
- Conference: Metro Atlantic Athletic Conference
- Record: 20–14 (14–4 MAAC)
- Head coach: Brian Giorgis (16th season)
- Assistant coaches: Erin Doughty; Maggie Gallagher; Keila Whittington
- Home arena: McCann Arena

2017–18 MAAC women's basketball standings
| | Conf. | | | | Overall |
| Team | W | | L | PCT | W | | L | PCT |
|---|---|---|---|---|---|---|---|---|
| Quinnipiac † | 18 | – | 0 | 1.000 | 28 | – | 6 | .824 |
| Marist | 14 | – | 4 | .778 | 20 | – | 14 | .588 |
| Siena | 11 | – | 7 | .611 | 17 | – | 14 | .548 |
| Rider | 10 | – | 8 | .556 | 14 | – | 17 | .452 |
| Fairfield | 10 | – | 8 | .556 | 13 | – | 17 | .433 |
| Manhattan | 9 | – | 9 | .500 | 13 | – | 18 | .419 |
| Niagara | 9 | – | 9 | .500 | 13 | – | 18 | .419 |
| Canisius | 8 | – | 10 | .444 | 10 | – | 20 | .333 |
| Monmouth | 7 | – | 11 | .389 | 10 | – | 21 | .323 |
| Iona | 2 | – | 16 | .111 | 2 | – | 28 | .067 |
| Saint Peter's | 1 | – | 17 | .056 | 4 | – | 26 | .133 |
† 2018 MAAC tournament winner As of March 19, 2018; Rankings from AP poll

The 2017–18 Marist Red Foxes women's basketball team represented Marist College during the 2017–18 NCAA Division I women's basketball season. The Red Foxes, led by sixteenth year head coach Brian Giorgis, play their home games at the McCann Field House and were members of the Metro Atlantic Athletic Conference. They finished the season 20–14, 14–4 in MAAC play to finish in second place. They advanced to the championship game of the MAAC women's tournament where they lost to Quinnipiac. They received an automatic bid to the Women's National Invitation Tournament where they lost to St. John's in the first round.

== Roster ==
2017–18 Marist Red Foxes women's basketball team
Players
Coaches

| Pos. | # | Name | Height | Year | Previous school | Hometown |
|---|---|---|---|---|---|---|
| G | 0 | Grace Vander Weide | 5 ft 11 in (1.8 m) | RS So | Valley High; Missouri State | West Des Moines, IA |
| G | 1 | Claire Oberdorf | 5 ft 6 in (1.68 m) | Jr | Greensburg Salem | Greensburg, PA |
| G | 2 | Allie Best | 5 ft 8 in (1.73 m) | Fr | Voorhees | Glen Gardner, NJ |
| F | 3 | Alana Gilmer | 6 ft 0 in (1.83 m) | RS So | Archbishop Williams; Virginia Tech | North Easton, MA |
| G | 4 | Allie Clement (C) | 5 ft 8 in (1.73 m) | RS Jr | Catherine McAuley | Falmouth, ME |
| F | 5 | Lovísa Henningsdóttir | 6 ft 2 in (1.88 m) | Jr | The Rock of Gainesville | Hafnarfjörður, Iceland |
| G | 10 | Maura Fitzpatrick | 5 ft 11 in (1.8 m) | Jr | Mercy | Cheshire, CT |
| F | 15 | Kendall Baab (C) | 6 ft 2 in (1.88 m) | Sr | Chaska | Chaska, MN |
| G | 20 | Hannah Hand | 5 ft 9 in (1.75 m) | So | Liberty Christian School | Argyle, TX |
| F | 21 | Willow Duffell | 6 ft 2 in (1.88 m) | Fr | Monroe Woodbury | Harriman, NY |
| G | 23 | Rebekah Hand | 5 ft 10 in (1.78 m) | So | Liberty Christian School | Argyle, TX |
| F | 25 | Gabi Redden | 6 ft 1 in (1.85 m) | Fr | Rutgers Prep School | Hillsborough, NJ |
| F | 31 | Molly Smith | 6 ft 1 in (1.85 m) | RS Fr | Holy Family Catholic | Shorewood, MN |

Head coach

- Brian Giorgis (SUNY Cortland)

Assistant coach(es)

- Erin Doughty (Marist)
- Maggie Gallagher (Marist)
- Keila Whittington (Dillard)

Legend

- (C) Team captain
- (S) Suspended
- (I) Ineligible
- (W) Walk-on
- Injured
- Current redshirt

Roster
Last update: March 10, 2018

== Schedule ==
| Date time, TV | Rank^{#} | Opponent^{#} | Result | Record | Site (attendance) city, state |
Exhibition
| 11/05/2017*; 7:00 pm | | Bloomfield | W 117–61 | | McCann Arena (1,105); Poughkeepsie, NY |
Non-conference regular season
| 11/10/2017*; 7:00 pm, ESPN3 | | Navy | L 70–77 | 0–1 | McCann Arena (1,608); Poughkeepsie, NY |
| 11/14/2017*; 7:00 pm, ESPN3 | | Holy Cross | W 85–74 | 1–1 | McCann Arena (1,382); Poughkeepsie, NY |
| 11/19/2017*; 2:00 pm | | at Northeastern | L 72–78 | 1–2 | Cabot Center (297); Boston, MA |
| 11/24/2017*; 10:30 pm | | at Hawaii; Rainbow Wahine Classic | L 63–70 | 1–3 | Stan Sheriff Center (6,306); Honolulu, HI |
| 11/25/2017*; 8:00 pm | | vs. USC; Rainbow Wahine Classic | L 57–78 | 1–4 | Stan Sheriff Center; Honolulu, HI |
| 11/26/2017*; 7:30 pm | | vs. Purdue; Rainbow Wahine Classic | L 47–61 | 1–5 | Stan Sheriff Center; Honolulu, HI |
| 11/30/2017*; 7:00 pm | | at Seton Hall | L 60–85 | 1–6 | Walsh Gymnasium (895); South Orange, NJ |
| 12/02/2017*; 7:00 pm, ESPN3 | | Dartmouth | L 51–60 | 1–7 | McCann Arena (1,508); Poughkeepsie, NY |
| 12/06/2017*; 5:00 pm, ESPN3 | | Rhode Island | W 64–42 | 2–7 | McCann Arena (1,334); Poughkeepsie, NY |
| 12/09/2017*; 2:00 pm | | at Boston University | W 80–52 | 3–7 | Case Gym (307); Boston, MA |
| 12/16/2017*; 2:00 pm | | at Temple | L 77–83 | 3–8 | McGonigle Hall (982); Philadelphia, PA |
| 12/21/2017*; 12:00 pm | | at UMass | W 88–60 | 4–8 | Mullins Center (322); Amherst, MA |
MAAC Regular season
| 12/28/2017; 7:00 pm | | at Rider | W 80–69 | 5–8 (1–0) | Alumni Gymnasium (873); Lawrenceville, NJ |
| 12/30/2017; 7:00 pm, ESPN3 | | Monmouth | W 69–46 | 6–8 (2–0) | McCann Arena (1,454); Poughkeepsie, NY |
| 01/06/2018; 7:00 pm, ESPN3 | | Manhattan | W 65–40 | 7–8 (3–0) | McCann Arena (1,576); Poughkeepsie, NY |
| 01/11/2018; 10:00 am, ESPNU | | at Quinnipiac | L 56–62 | 7–9 (3–1) | TD Bank Sports Center (2,514); Hamden, CT |
| 01/13/2018; 4:00 pm, ESPN3 | | Fairfield | W 71–63 | 8–9 (4–1) | McCann Arena (1,650); Poughkeepsie, NY |
| 01/18/2018; 5:00 pm | | at Siena | L 53–58 | 8–10 (4–2) | Times Union Center (504); Albany, NY |
| 01/21/2018; 2:00 pm, ESPN3 | | at Rider | W 68–67 | 9–10 (5–2) | McCann Arena (1,656); Poughkeepsie, NY |
| 01/23/2018; 7:00 pm | | at Saint Peter's | W 86–53 | 10–10 (6–2) | Yanitelli Center (223); Jersey City, NJ |
| 01/26/2018; 7:00 pm | | at Niagara | W 84–78 | 11–10 (7–2) | Gallagher Center (333); Lewiston, NY |
| 01/28/2018; 2:00 pm, ESPN3 | | at Canisius | W 78–53 | 12–10 (8–2) | Koessler Athletic Center (755); Buffalo, NY |
| 02/01/2018; 7:00 pm, ESPN3 | | Iona | W 75–55 | 13–10 (9–2) | McCann Arena (1,477); Poughkeepsie, NY |
| 02/03/2018; 7:00 pm, ESPN3 | | Siena | W 73–54 | 14–10 (10–2) | McCann Arena (1,623); Poughkeepsie, NY |
| 02/08/2018; 7:00 pm, ESPN3 | | at Monmouth | W 85–57 | 15–10 (11–2) | OceanFirst Bank Center (351); West Long Branch, NJ |
| 02/11/2018; 2:00 pm, ESPN3 | | Canisius | W 58–47 | 16–10 (12–2) | McCann Arena (1,783); Poughkeepsie, NY |
| 02/14/2018; 4:00 pm | | at Fairfield | W 48–34 | 17–10 (13–2) | Alumni Hall (487); Fairfield, CT |
| 02/18/2018; 2:00 pm, ESPN3 | | Quinnipiac | L 74–80 ^{2OT} | 17–11 (13–3) | McCann Arena (2,048); Poughkeepsie, NY |
| 02/20/2018; 7:00 pm, ESPN3 | | at Iona | W 55–45 | 18–11 (14–3) | Hynes Athletic Center (801); New Rochelle, NY |
| 02/24/2018; 7:00 pm, ESPN3 | | Niagara | L 61–68 | 18–12 (14–4) | McCann Arena (1,757); Poughkeepsie, NY |
MAAC Women's Tournament
| 03/02/2018; 3:30 pm, ESPN3 | (2) | vs. (7) Manhattan; Quarterfinals | W 84–60 | 19–12 | Times Union Center; Albany, NY |
| 03/04/2018; 1:30 pm, ESPN3 | (2) | vs. (3) Siena; Semifinals | W 67–51 | 20–12 | Times Union Center (2,208); Albany, NY |
| 03/05/2018; 2:30 pm, ESPNU | (2) | vs. (1) Quinnipiac; Championship Game | L 58–67 | 20–13 | Times Union Center (2,437); Albany, NY |
WNIT
| 03/15/2018*; 7:00 pm, ESPN3 | | at St. John's; First Round | L 47–68 | 20–14 | Carnesecca Arena (694); Queens, NY |
*Non-conference game. ^{#}Rankings from AP Poll. (#) Tournament seedings in parentheses. All times are in Eastern Time.

== See also ==
- 2017–18 Marist Red Foxes men's basketball team
