= Metro Conference women's basketball tournament =

- Conference basketball championship
- Sport: College basketball
- Conference: Metro Conference
- Number of teams: 11
- Format: Single-elimination tournament
- Current stadium: Boardwalk Hall
- Current location: Atlantic City, NJ
- Played: 1982–present
- Last contest: 2026
- Current champion: Fairfield Stags (7th)
- Most championships: Marist (11)
- Official website: MAACSports.com Women's Basketball

The Metro Conference women's basketball tournament determines the Metro Conference's champion and the winner of the conference's automatic bid to the NCAA Division I women's basketball tournament.

The conference changed its name to Metro Conference on July 1, 2026. It is not to be confused with the Metro Conference that operated from 1975 to 1995 before merging with the Great Midwest Conference to form the current Conference USA.

== Seeding ==
Seeds in the MAAC tournament are linked to teams' conference records. Non-conference games are not a factor. The team with the overall best record in the conference is seeded "1", the next best conference record "2", and so on.

Starting with the 2014 tournament, teams seeded from 1 to 6 receive a bye in the first round.

== Tournament champions by year ==
Year	Champion	Score	Runner-up	Tournament MVP	Location
1982	Saint Peter's	65–51	Army	Blanche Jones, St. Peter's	Brendan Byrne Arena (East Rutherford, New Jersey)
1983	Saint Peter's	59–51	Manhattan	Sheila Tighe, Manhattan	Brendan Byrne Arena (East Rutherford, New Jersey)
1984	Saint Peter's	80–69	Holy Cross	Amanda Berry, Saint Peter's	Brendan Byrne Arena (East Rutherford, New Jersey)
1985	Holy Cross	62–60	Saint Peter's	Janet Hourihan, Holy Cross	Alumni Hall (Fairfield, Connecticut)
1986	La Salle	78–67	Saint Peter's	Linda Hester, La Salle	Hart Center (Worcester, Massachusetts)
1987	Manhattan	70–64	Holy Cross	Bridget Robeson, Manhattan	Halsey Field House (Annapolis, Maryland)
1988	Fairfield	55–50	La Salle	Dana Pellegrino, Fairfield	Westchester County Center (White Plains, New York)
1989	Holy Cross	82–81	La Salle	Ann Lambiotte, Holy Cross	Hart Center (Worcester, Massachusetts)
1990	Manhattan	78–69	Holy Cross	Donna Seybold, Manhattan	Hayman Hall (Philadelphia)
1991	Fairfield	80–78	Saint Peter's	Lisa Mikelic, Fairfield	Draddy Gymnasium (Riverdale, New York)
1992	Saint Peter's	73–71	La Salle	Joann Balsamo, Saint Peter's	Knickerbocker Arena (Albany, New York)
1993	Saint Peter's	72–64	Loyola (MD)	Nadine Davis, Saint Peter's	Knickerbocker Arena (Albany, New York)
1994	Loyola (MD)	72–66	Fairfield	Patty Stoffey, Loyola (MD)	Knickerbocker Arena (Albany, New York)
1995	Loyola (MD)	67–51	Fairfield	Patty Stoffey, Loyola (MD)	Knickerbocker Arena (Albany, New York)
1996	Manhattan	92–66	Fairfield	Wanda Camps, Manhattan	Knickerbocker Arena (Albany, New York)
1997	Saint Peter's	66–38	Niagara	Crystal Robinson, Saint Peter's	Marine Midland Arena (Buffalo, New York)
1998	Fairfield	59–53	Loyola (MD)	Page Driscoll, Fairfield	Pepsi Arena (Albany, New York)
1999	Saint Peter's	64–62	Siena	Leah Cromer, Saint Peter's	Marine Midland Arena (Buffalo, New York)
2000	Saint Peter's	61–46	Fairfield	Lawanda Greene, Saint Peter's	Pepsi Arena (Albany, New York)
2001	Siena	70–68	Fairfield	Liene Jansone, Siena	HSBC Center (Buffalo, New York)
2002	Saint Peter's	83–71	Siena	Felicia Harris, Saint Peter's	Pepsi Arena (Albany, New York)
2003	Manhattan	65–57	Siena	Siobhan Kilkenny, Manhattan	Sovereign Bank Arena (Trenton, New Jersey)
2004	Marist	76–74	Canisius	Stephanie Del Preore, Marist	Pepsi Arena (Albany, New York)
2005	Canisius	60–59	Marist	Becky Zak, Canisius	HSBC Arena (Buffalo, New York)
2006	Marist	68–57	Loyola (MD)	Meg Dahlman, Marist	Pepsi Arena (Albany, New York)
2007	Marist	64–57 (OT)	Iona	Rachele Fitz, Marist	Arena at Harbor Yard (Bridgeport, Connecticut)
2008	Marist	83–63	Iona	Sarah Smrdel, Marist	Times Union Center (Albany, New York)
2009	Marist	78–63	Canisius	Julianne Viani, Marist	Times Union Center (Albany, New York)
2010	Marist	66–49	Fairfield	Rachele Fitz, Marist	Times Union Center (Albany, New York)
2011	Marist	63–45	Loyola (MD)	Erica Allenspach, Marist	Webster Bank Arena (Bridgeport, Connecticut)
2012	Marist	61–35	Fairfield	Corielle Yarde, Marist	MassMutual Center (Springfield, Massachusetts)
2013	Marist	72–48	Iona	Elizabeth Beynnon, Marist	MassMutual Center (Springfield, Massachusetts)
2014	Marist	70–66	Quinnipiac	Sydney Coffey, Marist	MassMutual Center (Springfield, Massachusetts)
2015	Quinnipiac	72–61	Marist	Jasmine Martin, Quinnipiac	Times Union Center (Albany, New York)
2016	Iona	57–41	Quinnipiac	Marina Lizarazu, Iona	Times Union Center (Albany, New York)
2017	Quinnipiac	81–73	Rider	Adily Martucci, Quinnipiac	Times Union Center (Albany, New York)
2018	Quinnipiac	67–58	Marist	Jen Fay, Quinnipiac	Times Union Center (Albany, New York)
2019	Quinnipiac	81–51	Marist	Jen Fay, Quinnipiac	Times Union Center (Albany, New York)
2020	Cancelled due to the coronavirus pandemic				
2021	Marist	69–30	Saint Peter's	Willow Duffell, Marist	Boardwalk Hall (Atlantic City, New Jersey)
2022	Fairfield	73–68	Manhattan	Lou Lopez-Senechal, Fairfield	Boardwalk Hall (Atlantic City, New Jersey)
2023	Iona	73–60	Manhattan	Juana Camilion, Iona	Boardwalk Hall (Atlantic City, New Jersey)
2024	Fairfield	70–62 (OT)	Niagara	Janelle Brown, Fairfield	Boardwalk Hall (Atlantic City, New Jersey)
2025	Fairfield	76-53	Quinnipiac	Meghan Andersen, Fairfield	Boardwalk Hall (Atlantic City, New Jersey)
2026	Fairfield	51-44	Quinnipiac	Jillian Huerter, Fairfield	Boardwalk Hall (Atlantic City, New Jersey)

== Performance by school ==
School	Championships	Runner-up	Last title	Last title appearance
Marist	11	4	2021	2021
Saint Peter's	9	4	2002	2021
Fairfield	7	7	2026	2026
Quinnipiac	4	3	2019	2025
Manhattan	4	3	2003	2023
Loyola (MD) †	2	4	1995	2011
Holy Cross †	2	3	1989	1990
Iona	2	3	2023	2023
Siena	1	3	2001	2003
La Salle †	1	3	1986	1992
Canisius	1	2	2005	2009
Niagara	0	2		2024
Rider	0	1		2017
Army †	0	1		1982
Monmouth†	0	0		-

- † No longer a member of the Metro

Of current teams in the Metro, Merrimack, Mount St. Mary's, and Sacred Heart have never made or won the conference championship game. It must be noted that these are the conference's three newest members—Mount St. Mary's joined in 2022, and Merrimack and Sacred Heart in 2024.

== See also ==
- MAAC men's basketball tournament
