= Marist Red Foxes basketball =

Marist Red Foxes basketball may refer to either of the basketball teams that represent Marist College:

- Marist Red Foxes men's basketball
- Marist Red Foxes women's basketball
