= Liene Jansone =

Latvian basketball player

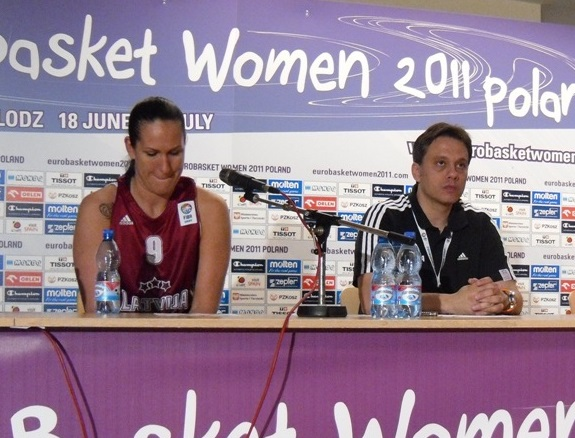

Personal information
- Born: 22 May 1981 (age 45): Riga, Latvian SSR, USSR; (now Latvia)
- Listed height: 1.92 m (6 ft 4 in)
- Listed weight: 89 kg (196 lb)

Career information
- College: Siena (2000–2004)
- Playing career: 1997–present
- Position: Power forward

Career history
- 1997–1999: TTT/Rīga (Latvia)
- 2004–2005: Hapoel Haifa B.C. (Israel)
- 2005–2006: Ensino (Spain)
- 2006–2007: Avenida (Spain)
- 2007–2008: Hondarribia (Spain)
- 2008–2009: Gambrinus Brno (Czech Republic)
- 2009: Tarbes GB (France)
- 2009–2010: Umbertide (Italy)
- 2010: Reyer Venezia (Italy)
- 2010–2011: Pool Comense (Italy)
- 2011–2012: Pays d'Aix Basket 13 (France)
- 2012–2013: Tarsus Belediyesi (Turkey)
- 2013–2014: Diósgyőri VTK(Hungary)

Career highlights
- MAAC Tournament MVP (2001)

Liene Jansone (born 22 May 1981, in Riga) is a Latvian women's basketball player who has most recently played for the Tarsus Belediyesi of the Turkish Women's Basketball League and is member of the Latvian national team. She is a 1.92 m (6 ft 4 in) tall power forward.

Both of her parents were basketball coaches and her younger sister, Līga, is a former basketball player. Jansone started playing at a professional level in 1997, in the local TTT/Rīga team.

She was a member of the Siena Saints NCAA team from 2000 until 2004. Jansone eventually became one of the team's leaders. In her first year, the team won NCAA Conference. Jansone was named the Most Valuable Player. Since then, she has played in Europe.

Jansone is a member of the Latvian national team. Prior to playing at a senior level, she played at the under-18 and under-20 levels. She made her senior debut on 6 August 2005. Jansone has represented Latvia at several Eurobasket Women (2005, 2007, 2009, 2011) and at the 2008 Summer Olympics.

== Siena statistics ==
Ratios
Year	Team	GP	FG%	3P%	FT%	RBG	APG	BPG	SPG	PPG
2000–01	Siena	30	58.8%	–	77.9%	8.80	0.90	0.40	1.10	13.90
2001–02	Siena	23	60.5%	100.0%	84.3%	6.17	0.74	0.48	0.91	15.52
2002–03	Siena	33	60.3%	35.3%	75.4%	8.94	0.97	0.30	0.70	17.24
2003–04	Siena	19	55.4%	56.3%	72.9%	8.74	0.74	0.37	1.11	15.63
Career		105	59.1%	47.1%	77.7%	8.26	0.87	0.39	0.93	15.61

Totals
Year	Team	GP	FG	FGA	3P	3PA	FT	FTA	REB	A	BK	ST	PTS
2000–01	Siena	30	157	267	-	-	102	131	264	28	13	33	416
2001–02	Siena	23	135	223	1	1	86	102	142	17	11	21	357
2002–03	Siena	33	234	388	6	17	95	126	295	32	10	23	569
2003–04	Siena	19	113	204	9	16	62	85	166	14	7	21	297
Career		105	639	1082	16	34	345	444	867	91	41	98	1639
