= 2018–19 Quinnipiac Bobcats women's basketball team =

Intercollegiate basketball season

2018–19 Quinnipiac Bobcats women's basketball
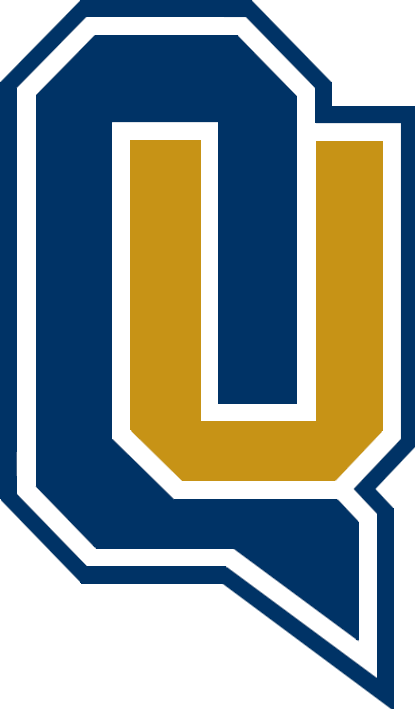

MAAC Regular Season Champions MAAC tournament champions

NCAA tournament, first round
- Conference: Metro Atlantic Athletic Conference
- Record: 26–7 (18–0 MAAC)
- Head coach: Tricia Fabbri (24th season)
- Assistant coaches: Brian Wilson; Danielle Brennan; Destini Hughes-Santos
- Home arena: People's United Center

2018–19 MAAC women's basketball standings
	Conf.				Overall
Team	W		L	PCT	W		L	PCT
Quinnipiac †	18	–	0	1.000	26	–	7	.788
Rider	14	–	4	.778	19	–	13	.594
Marist	13	–	5	.722	23	–	10	.697
Monmouth	9	–	9	.500	14	–	17	.452
Canisius	9	–	9	.500	11	–	19	.367
Manhattan	9	–	9	.500	12	–	19	.387
Siena	8	–	10	.444	12	–	18	.400
Niagara	8	–	10	.444	12	–	19	.387
Fairfield	7	–	11	.389	11	–	20	.355
Iona	3	–	15	.167	5	–	26	.161
Saint Peter's	1	–	17	.056	6	–	24	.200
† 2019 MAAC tournament winner As of March 23, 2019; Rankings from AP poll

The 2018–19 Quinnipiac Bobcats women's basketball team represented Quinnipiac University during the 2018–19 NCAA Division I women's basketball season. The Bobcats were led by twenty-fourth year head coach, Tricia Fabbri, played their home games at People's United Center and were members of the Metro Atlantic Athletic Conference. They finished the season 26–7, 18–0 in MAAC play to win MAAC regular season and tournament titles to earn an automatic trip to the NCAA women's tournament. They lost to South Dakota State in the first round.

== Roster ==
2018–19 Quinnipiac Bobcats women's basketball team
Players
Coaches

Pos.	#	Name	Height	Year	Previous school	Hometown
G/F	1	Vanessa Udoji	5 ft 11 in (1.8 m)	Jr	Northfield Mount Hermon	Randolph, MA
G	2	Taylor Herd	5 ft 9 in (1.75 m)	Jr	Lansdale Catholic	Quakertown, PA
F	4	Paula Strautmane	6 ft 0 in (1.83 m)	Sr	Latvia U16, U18 & U20 National Team; TTT Riga	Mucenieki, Latvia
G	5	Shaq Edwards	5 ft 5 in (1.65 m)	RS So	Weaver; La Salle	Hartford, CT
F	10	Jaden Ward	6 ft 0 in (1.83 m)	Jr	Wisconsin Dells	Wisconsin Dells, WI
G	11	Edel Thornton	5 ft 11 in (1.8 m)	Sr	Ireland U18 National Team; Brunell	Gurranabraher, Ireland
F	13	Rachael Stovall	6 ft 3 in (1.91 m)	Fr	TPLS Christian Academy	Hopewell, VA
F	20	Paige Warfel	6 ft 0 in (1.83 m)	Jr	Downingtown East	Chester Springs, PA
F	21	Jen Fay	6 ft 0 in (1.83 m)	RS Sr	Lynbrook; Nazareth	Lynbrook, NY
G	22	MacKenzie DeWees	5 ft 9 in (1.75 m)	Fr	Manchester Valley	Westminster, MD
G	23	Brittany Martin	5 ft 6 in (1.68 m)	Sr	Timber Creek	Sicklerville, NJ
G	24	Amani Free	6 ft 0 in (1.83 m)	Fr	Cicero-North Syracuse	Clay, NY
G/F	25	Aryn McClure	5 ft 11 in (1.8 m)	Sr	Archbishop Molloy	Springfield Gardens, NY
G/F	32	Danelle Bradley	6 ft 0 in (1.83 m)	So	Pickerington North	Pickerington, OH
G	33	Chiara Bacchini	5 ft 10 in (1.78 m)	So	Liceo Linguistico G. Marconi	Parma, Italy

Head coach

- Tricia Fabbri (Fairfield)

Assistant coach(es)

- Brian Wilson (Virginia)
- Danielle Brennan (Hartford)
- Destini Hughes (LSU)

Legend

- (C) Team captain
- (S) Suspended
- (I) Ineligible
- (W) Walk-on
- Injured
- Current redshirt

Roster

== Schedule ==
Date time, TV	Rank^{#}	Opponent^{#}	Result	Record	Site (attendance) city, state
Non-conference regular season
Nov 9, 2018*; 7:00 pm		at Drexel	W 56–52	1–0	Daskalakis Athletic Center (1,370); Philadelphia, PA
Nov 11, 2018*; 4:00 pm		at Bucknell	L 58–75	1–1	Sojka Pavilion (1,215); Lewisburg, PA
Nov 15, 2018*; 7:00 pm		at Providence	W 48–44	2–1	Alumni Hall (342); Providence, RI
Nov 23, 2018*; 5:00 pm		vs. No. 10 Texas; Gulf Coast Showcase Quarterfinals	L 55–56	2–2	Hertz Arena (1,107); Estero, FL
Nov 24, 2018*; 1:30 pm		vs. Missouri; Gulf Coast Showcase Consolation 2nd round	L 51–65	2–3	Hertz Arena (716); Estero, FL
Nov 25, 2018*; 11:00 am		vs. Ball State; Gulf Coast Showcase Consolation 7th place game	W 69–66	3–3	Hertz Arena (516); Estero, FL
Nov 30, 2018*; 7:00 pm, ESPN+		at Harvard	W 72–66 ^{OT}	4–3	Lavietes Pavilion (764); Cambridge, MA
Dec 2, 2018*; 2:00 pm, ESPN+		Central Michigan	L 52–67	4–4	People's United Center (872); Hamden, CT
Dec 8, 2018*; 7:00 pm, ESPN+		at Princeton	L 42–54	4–5	Jadwin Gymnasium (615); Princeton, NJ
Dec 19, 2018*; 5:30 pm		Richmond	W 65–48	5–5	People's United Center (453); Hamden, CT
Dec 30, 2018*; 2:00 pm		UCF	L 45–47	5–6	People's United Center (1,080); Hamden, CT
MAAC regular season
Jan 3, 2019; 7:00 pm, ESPN3		Fairfield	W 81–36	6–6 (1–0)	People's United Center (397); Hamden, CT
Jan 6, 2019; 2:00 pm		Saint Peter's	W 90–45	7–6 (2–0)	People's United Center (397); Hamden, CT
Jan 10, 2019; 12:00 pm, ESPNU		at Marist	W 76–69	8–6 (3–0)	McCann Arena (1,514); Poughkeepsie, NY
Jan 12, 2019; 2:00 pm, ESPN3		Monmouth	W 67–38	9–6 (4–0)	People's United Center (887); Hamden, CT
Jan 18, 2019; 11:00 am		at Niagara	W 96–55	10–6 (5–0)	Gallagher Center (2,100); Lewiston, NY
Jan 20, 2019; 2:00 pm, ESPN+		at Canisius	W 55–42	11–6 (6–0)	Koessler Athletic Center (595); Buffalo, NY
Jan 25, 2019; 11:00 am, ESPN+		Siena	W 68–31	12–6 (7–0)	People's United Center (3,025); Hamden, CT
Jan 27, 2019; 1:00 pm		at Iona	W 76–39	13–6 (8–0)	Hynes Athletic Center (641); New Rochelle, NY
Feb 1, 2019; 7:00 pm, ESPN+		at Monmouth	W 58–46	14–6 (9–0)	OceanFirst Bank Center (375); West Long Branch, NJ
Feb 3, 2019; 1:00 pm, ESPN+		Rider	W 72–56	15–6 (10–0)	People's United Center (687); Hamden, CT
Feb 7, 2019; 7:00 pm, ESPN+		Niagara	W 62–42	16–6 (11–0)	People's United Center (451); Hamden, CT
Feb 9, 2019; 2:00 pm, ESPN+		Canisius	W 68–51	17–6 (12–0)	People's United Center (1,012); Hamden, CT
Feb 15, 2019; 7:00 pm, ESPN+		at Manhattan	W 64–39	18–6 (13–0)	Draddy Gymnasium (472); Riverdale, NY
Feb 17, 2019; 2:00 pm, ESPN+		at Fairfield	W 48–40	19–6 (14–0)	Alumni Hall (854); Fairfield, CT
Feb 21, 2019; 7:00 pm, ESPN+		at Rider	W 66–60	20–6 (15–0)	Alumni Gymnasium (790); Lawrenceville, NJ
Feb 23, 2019; 2:00 pm, ESPN+		Marist	W 76–69	21–6 (16–0)	People's United Center (1,102); Hamden, CT
Feb 28, 2019; 7:00 pm, ESPN+		Manhattan	W 59–42	22–6 (14–0)	People's United Center (512); Hamden, CT
Mar 2, 2019; 2:00 pm, ESPN+		at Siena	W 67–38	23–6 (18–0)	Alumni Recreation Center (603); Loudonville, NY
MAAC Women's Tournament
Mar 8, 2019; 1:00 pm, ESPN3	(1)	vs. (9) Fairfield; Quarterfinals	W 63–48	24–6	Times Union Center; Albany, NY
Mar 10, 2019; 11:00 am, ESPN3	(1)	vs. (4) Monmouth; Semifinals	W 80–42	25–6	Times Union Center; Albany, NY
Mar 11, 2019; 2:30 pm, ESPNU	(1)	vs. (3) Marist; Championship Game	W 81–51	26–6	Times Union Center (1,780); Albany, NY
NCAA Women's Tournament
Mar 23, 2019*; 11:00 am, ESPN2	(11 P)	vs. (6 P) South Dakota State; First Round	L 65–76	26–7	Carrier Dome; Syracuse, NY
*Non-conference game. ^{#}Rankings from AP Poll. (#) Tournament seedings in parentheses. P=Portland Region. All times are in Eastern Time.

== Rankings ==
2018–19 NCAA Division I women's basketball rankings

+ Regular season polls	Poll	Pre- Season	Week 2	Week 3	Week 4	Week 5	Week 6	Week 7	Week 8	Week 9	Week 10	Week 11	Week 12	Week 13	Week 14	Week 15	Week 16	Week 17	Week 18	Week 19	Final
AP																			RV	N/A	
Coaches	RV	N/A																			

Legend
	Increase in ranking
	Decrease in ranking
	Not ranked previous week
(RV)	Received Votes

== See also ==
- 2018–19 Quinnipiac Bobcats men's basketball team
