= Iona Gaels basketball =

Iona Gaels basketball may refer to either of the basketball teams that represent Iona College:

- Iona Gaels men's basketball
- Iona Gaels women's basketball
