= Siena Saints basketball =

Siena Saints basketball may refer to either of the basketball teams that represent Siena University:

- Siena Saints men's basketball
- Siena Saints women's basketball
