= Marianne Reilly =

American athletics administrator

Biographical details
- Education: Manhattan College, Lehman College, Fordham University

Playing career
- 1978–1982: Manhattan

Coaching career (HC unless noted)
- ?–?: Fordham (assistant)
- ?–?: Mount Saint Vincent

Administrative career (AD unless noted)
- 1996–2016: Fordham (associate AD)
- 2016–2023: Manhattan

Marianne Reilly is an American college athletics administrator. Reilly served as an associate athletic director at Fordham University from 1996 to 2016, and as director of athletics for Manhattan College from 2016 to 2023. Reilly attended college at Manhattan College, where she played on the school's women's basketball team. Reilly was named athletic director at Manhattan College on March 30, 2016. On June 1, 2023, Reilly announced that she would be stepping down as Manhattan's athletic director on July 1, 2023.
