= Liceo Marconi =

Liceo Marconi can refer to:

Schools in Italy:

- Liceo Marconi Conegliano - Conegliano
- Liceo Scientifico e Liceo Artistico "G.Marconi" - Foligno
- Liceo Scientifico "G. Marconi" - Milan
- Liceo scientifico e musicale Marconi - Pesaro
- Liceo Marconi Pescara - Pescara
- Liceo Scientifico Statale "G. Marconi" - Sassari

Schools outside of Italy:

- Liceo Superimentale "G. Marconi" in Asmara, Eritrea
- The high school section of La Scuola d'Italia Guglielmo Marconi in New York City
