= Niagara Purple Eagles basketball =

Niagara Purple Eagles basketball may refer to either of the basketball teams that represent Niagara University:

- Niagara Purple Eagles men's basketball
- Niagara Purple Eagles women's basketball
