= 2017–18 Quinnipiac Bobcats women's basketball team =

Intercollegiate basketball season

2017–18 Quinnipiac Bobcats women's basketball
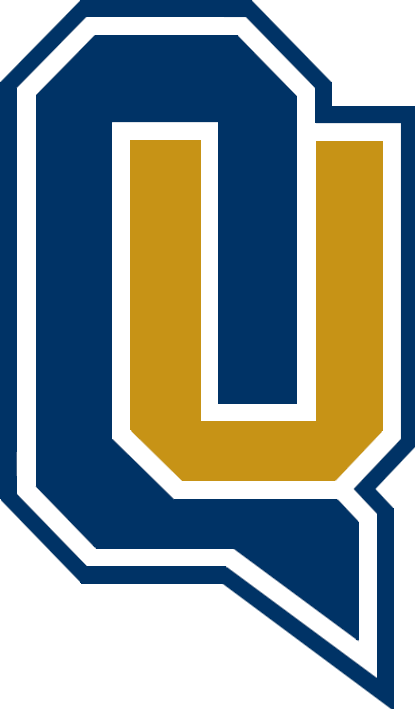

MAAC Regular Season and Tournament Champions

NCAA Women's Tournament, second round
- Conference: Metro Atlantic Athletic Conference
- Record: 28–6 (18–0 MAAC)
- Head coach: Tricia Fabbri (23rd season)
- Assistant coaches: Mountain MacGillivray; Danielle Brennan; Destini Hughes
- Home arena: TD Bank Sports Center

2017–18 MAAC women's basketball standings
	Conf.				Overall
Team	W		L	PCT	W		L	PCT
Quinnipiac †	18	–	0	1.000	28	–	6	.824
Marist	14	–	4	.778	20	–	14	.588
Siena	11	–	7	.611	17	–	14	.548
Rider	10	–	8	.556	14	–	17	.452
Fairfield	10	–	8	.556	13	–	17	.433
Manhattan	9	–	9	.500	13	–	18	.419
Niagara	9	–	9	.500	13	–	18	.419
Canisius	8	–	10	.444	10	–	20	.333
Monmouth	7	–	11	.389	10	–	21	.323
Iona	2	–	16	.111	2	–	28	.067
Saint Peter's	1	–	17	.056	4	–	26	.133
† 2018 MAAC tournament winner As of March 19, 2018; Rankings from AP poll

The 2017–18 Quinnipiac Bobcats women's basketball team represented Quinnipiac University during the 2017–18 NCAA Division I women's basketball season. The Bobcats were led by twenty-third year head coach, Tricia Fabbri. They played their home games in TD Bank Sports Center and are members of the Metro Atlantic Athletic Conference. They finished the season 28–6, 18–0 in MAAC play to win MAAC regular season and tournament titles to earn an automatic trip to the NCAA women's tournament. They defeated Miami in the first round before losing to Connecticut in the second round.

== Previous season ==
They finished the season 29–7, 17–3 in MAAC play to win MAAC regular season and tournament titles to earn an automatic trip to the NCAA women's tournament.. They upset Marquette and Miami (FL) in the first and second rounds before falling to eventual champions South Carolina in the sweet sixteen.

== Roster ==
2017–18 Quinnipiac Bobcats women's basketball team
Players
Coaches

Pos.	#	Name	Height	Year	Previous school	Hometown
G/F	1	Vanessa Udoji	5 ft 11 in (1.8 m)	So	Northfield Mount Hermon	Randolph, MA
G	2	Taylor Herd	5 ft 9 in (1.75 m)	So	Lansdale Catholic	Quakertown, PA
F	4	Paula Strautmane	6 ft 0 in (1.83 m)	Jr	Latvia U16, U18 & U20 National Team; TTT Riga	Mucenieki, Latvia
G	5	Carly Fabbri	5 ft 7 in (1.7 m)	Sr	Lauralton Hall	Stratford, CT
F	10	Jaden Ward	6 ft 0 in (1.83 m)	So	Wisconsin Dells	Wisconsin Dells, WI
G	11	Edel Thornton	5 ft 11 in (1.8 m)	Jr	Ireland U18 National Team; Brunell	Gurranabraher, Ireland
F	13	Sarah Shewan	6 ft 2 in (1.88 m)	Sr	St. Thomas Aquinas Catholic	Russell, ON
F	20	Paige Warfel	6 ft 0 in (1.83 m)	So	Downingtown East	Chester Springs, PA
F	21	Jen Fay	6 ft 0 in (1.83 m)	RS Jr	Lynbrook; Nazareth	Lynbrook, NY
G	23	Brittany Martin	5 ft 6 in (1.68 m)	Jr	Timber Creek	Sicklerville, NJ
C	24	Katie Grant	6 ft 4 in (1.93 m)	So	Horizon	Phoenix, AZ
G/F	25	Aryn McClure	5 ft 11 in (1.8 m)	Jr	Archbishop Molloy	Springfield Gardens, NY
G/F	32	Danelle Bradley	6 ft 0 in (1.83 m)	Fr	Pickerington North	Pickerington, OH
G	33	Chiara Bacchini	5 ft 10 in (1.78 m)	Fr	Liceo Linguistico G. Marconi	Parma, Italy

Head coach

- Tricia Fabbri (Fairfield)

Assistant coach(es)

- Mountain MacGillivray (Temple)
- Danielle Brennan (Hartford)
- Destini Hughes (LSU)

Legend

- (C) Team captain
- (S) Suspended
- (I) Ineligible
- (W) Walk-on
- Injured
- Current redshirt

Roster
Last update: March 10, 2018

== Schedule ==
Date time, TV	Rank^{#}	Opponent^{#}	Result	Record	Site (attendance) city, state
Non-conference regular season
11/10/2017*; 6:00 pm		at Iowa; Hawkeye Challenge semifinals	L 67–83	0–1	Carver–Hawkeye Arena (3,758); Iowa City, IA
11/11/2017*; 3:00 pm		vs. No. 16 Missouri; Hawkeye Challenge 3rd place game	L 51–66	0–2	Carver–Hawkeye Arena (1,027); Iowa City, IA
11/17/2017*; 7:00 pm		at No. 9 Ohio State	L 63–95	0–3	Value City Arena (3,793); Columbus, OH
11/22/2017*; 1:00 pm, ESPN3		Northern Colorado	W 60–49	1–3	TD Bank Sports Center (604); Hamden, CT
11/28/2017*; 7:00 pm, ESPN3		Dayton	W 72–66	2–3	TD Bank Sports Center (556); Hamden, CT
12/01/2017*; 7:00 pm		at Richmond	W 81–65	3–3	Robins Center (423); Richmond, VA
12/03/2017*; 1:00 pm		at Hampton	W 62–58	4–3	Hampton Convocation Center (2,124); Hampton, VA
12/06/2017*; 7:00 pm, ESPN3		Providence	W 62–36	5–3	TD Bank Sports Center (517); Hamden, CT
12/09/2017*; 1:00 pm, ESPN3		Princeton	L 46–60	5–4	TD Bank Sports Center (502); Hamden, CT
12/19/2017*; 9:00 pm		at Michigan State	L 55–74	5–5	Breslin Center (4,220); East Lansing, MI
12/21/2017*; 7:00 pm, ESPN3		at Central Michigan	W 84–70	6–5	McGuirk Arena (1,645); Mount Pleasant, MI
MAAC regular season
12/28/2017; 5:00 pm, ESPN3		Siena	W 68–54	7–5 (1–0)	TD Bank Sports Center (1,068); Hamden, CT
12/31/2017; 2:00 pm		at Manhattan	W 80–64	8–5 (2–0)	Draddy Gymnasium (160); Riverdale, NY
01/04/2018; 7:00 pm, ESPN3		Niagara	W 77–61	9–5 (3–0)	TD Bank Sports Center (37); Hamden, CT
01/06/2018; 1:00 pm, ESPN3		at Iona	W 74–38	10–5 (4–0)	Hynes Athletic Center (556); New Rochelle, NY
01/11/2018; 10:00 am, ESPNU		Marist	W 62–56	11–5 (5–0)	TD Bank Sports Center (2,514); Hamden, CT
01/13/2018; 1:00 pm, ESPN3		Saint Peter's	W 86–39	12–5 (6–0)	TD Bank Sports Center (602); Hamden, CT
01/15/2018; 6:00 pm, ESPN3		Rider	W 73–66	13–5 (7–0)	TD Bank Sports Center (337); Hamden, CT
01/18/2018; 11:30 am		at Monmouth	W 76–55	14–5 (8–0)	OceanFirst Bank Center (2,530); West Long Branch, NJ
01/20/2018; 2:00 pm, ESPN3		Fairifeld	W 77–45	15–5 (9–0)	TD Bank Sports Center (1,197); Hamden, CT
01/26/2018; 11:00 am, ESPN3		at Canisius	W 84–55	16–5 (10–0)	Koessler Athletic Center (2,196); Buffalo, NY
01/28/2018; 2:00 pm		at Niagara	W 84–55	17–5 (11–0)	Gallagher Center (391); Lewiston, NY
02/02/2018; 7:00 pm		at Fairifeld	W 58–39	18–5 (12–0)	Alumni Hall (652); Fairfield, CT
02/04/2018; 12:00 pm, ESPN3		Iona	W 90–47	19–5 (13–0)	TD Bank Sports Center (1,452); Hamden, CT
02/09/2018; 5:00 pm, ESPN3		Canisius	W 64–39	20–5 (14–0)	TD Bank Sports Center (1,297); Hamden, CT
02/11/2017; 2:00 pm, ESPN3		at Siena	W 83–72	21–5 (15–0)	Alumni Recreation Center (1,136); Loundonville, NY
02/18/2018; 2:00 pm, ESPN3		at Marist	W 80–74 ^{2OT}	22–5 (16–0)	McCann Field House (2,048); Poughkeepsie, NY
02/23/2018; 7:00 pm		at Rider	W 80–59	23–5 (17–0)	Alumni Gymnasium (1,241); Lawrenceville, NJ
02/25/2018; 2:00 pm, ESPN3		Monmouth	W 77–57	24–5 (18–0)	TD Bank Sports Center (2,112); Hamden, CT
MAAC Women's Tournament
03/02/2018; 1:00 pm, ESPN3	(1)	vs. (9) Monmouth; Quarterfinals	W 83–44	25–5	Times Union Center; Albany, NY
03/04/2018; 11:30 am, ESPN3	(1)	vs. (5) Rider; Semifinals	W 82–62	26–5	Times Union Center; Albany, NY
03/05/2018; 2:30 pm, ESPNU	(1)	vs. (2) Marist; Championship Game	W 67–58	27–5	Times Union Center (2,437); Albany, NY
NCAA Women's Tournament
03/17/2018*; 1:30 pm, ESPN2	(9 A)	vs. (8 A) Miami (FL); First Round	W 86–72	28–5	Harry A. Gampel Pavilion (6,154); Storrs, CT
03/19/2018*; 6:30 pm, ESPN2	(9 A)	at (1 A) No. 1 Connecticut; Second Round	L 46–71	28–6	Harry A. Gampel Pavilion (8,957); Storrs, CT
*Non-conference game. ^{#}Rankings from AP Poll. (#) Tournament seedings in parentheses. A=Albany Region. All times are in Eastern Time.

== Rankings ==
2017–18 NCAA Division I women's basketball rankings

+ Regular season polls	Poll	Pre- Season	Week 2	Week 3	Week 4	Week 5	Week 6	Week 7	Week 8	Week 9	Week 10	Week 11	Week 12	Week 13	Week 14	Week 15	Week 16	Week 17	Week 18	Week 19	Final
AP	RV														RV	RV	RV	RV	RV	N/A	
Coaches	RV	N/A												RV	RV	RV	RV	RV	RV	RV	

Legend
	Increase in ranking
	Decrease in ranking
	Not ranked previous week
(RV)	Received Votes

== See also ==
- 2017–18 Quinnipiac Bobcats men's basketball team
