= Mike Granelli =

American retired teacher and coach

Mike Granelli (born January 25, 1939) is a retired teacher and coach who primarily worked at Hoboken High School and Saint Peter's College. With Hoboken between 1964 and 1995, Granelli had 60 wins and 14 losses in soccer matches while he primarily taught physical education. At Saint Peter's College, Granelli had 161 wins, 119 losses and 26 ties between 1970 and 1989. During this time period, he received the Coach of the Year award twice as part of the Tri-State Soccer Conference.

Outside of soccer, Granelli was the women's basketball coach at Saint Peter's between 1972 and 2004. During his tenure, his team reached the second round of the 1980 AIAW National Division II Basketball Championship. As an NCAA Division I coach, Granelli and his team were a nine-time winner of the MAAC women's basketball tournament. After he became the first man to have 600 women's basketball career wins in 2004, Granelli left his position that year with 607 wins and 259 losses. With the Metro Atlantic Athletic Conference, Granelli joined their Honor Roll in 2013 and the 40th Anniversary Women's Basketball Team in 2020.

== Early life and education ==
Granelli was born on January 25, 1939, in Hoboken, New Jersey. During his childhood, Granelli lived with his mother after the death of his father. As a teenager, Granelli started his coaching experience in amateur baseball. He continued his amateur coaching career while at Mount St. Mary's University.

== Career ==
=== Educational and soccer career ===
While in Hoboken, Granelli was a history teacher. At Hoboken High School from 1964 to 1995, Granelli taught physical education. By the 1970s, he accumulated 60 wins and 14 losses as their soccer coach. As a director, he was in charge of sports at the Hoboken-North Hudson YMCA.

In 1970, Granelli continued his coaching career with Saint Peter's College. As part of the Tri-State Soccer Conference, Granelli received the Coach of the Year award in 1982 and 1984. After he left the men's soccer team in 1989, Granelli had 161 wins, 119 losses and 26 ties.

=== Basketball ===
While continuing his soccer tenure at Saint Peter's, Granelli became their women's basketball coach in 1972 as a part-time employee. As part of the AIAW, his team reached the second round of the 1980 AIAW National Division II Basketball Championship. In 1982, Saint Peter's left the AIAW and joined the NCAA. Leading up to 2002, Granelli and Saint Peter's won the MAAC women's basketball tournament nine times and participated in seven NCAA Division I women's basketball tournaments. During this time period, Granelli became a full-time employee in 1997 for Saint Peter's.

As part of the Women's National Invitation Tournament, Saint Peter's and Granelli played in the first round of the 2003 preseason event. In January 2004, he was "the third coach to reach 600 wins at one school" for NCAA women's basketball teams. Granelli was the only man to have 600 women's basketball wins before Andy Landers reached this record the following month. That year, Granelli stepped down from his coaching position in September 2004. At the time, Granelli had 607 wins and 249 losses in women's basketball.

== Awards and honors ==
As part of the Metro Atlantic Athletic Conference for women's basketball teams, Granelli was named Coach of the Year four times and Co-Coach of the Year once between 1982 and 1999. For the MAAC, Granelli joined their Honor Holl in 2013. In 2020, Granelli was named as part of their 40th Anniversary Women's Basketball Team. During this time period, Granelli became part of a hall of fame for Saint Peter's in 1989.

Between 1996 and 2002, Granelli was a three-time Division I Women's Coach of the Year recipient from the Metropolitan Basketball Writers Association. From the New Jersey Sports Writers Association, he was chosen as their Coaching Legend for 2001. In 2009, Granelli was one of the recipients of the Distinguished Service Award by the MBWA. Granelli was chosen as one of the best New Jersey coaches for college basketball by the Herald News in 2021.

== Legal issues and personal life ==
In the late 1990s, Granelli sued Saint Peter's for $3 million for discrimination. During the case, Granelli wrote that the given amount of resources and money for his women's basketball team were less than the men's basketball team at Saint Peter's. Granelli also believed that the college discriminated against him based on age and gender. He had five children during his marriage.

== See also ==
- List of college women's basketball career coaching wins leaders
