= 2018 MAAC women's basketball tournament =

- Classification: Division I
- Season: 2017–18
- Teams: 11
- Site: Times Union Center; Albany, NY
- Champions: Quinnipiac (4th title)
- Winning coach: Tricia Fabbri (4th title)
- MVP: Jen Fay (Quinnipiac)
- Top scorers: Alana Gilmer – 64 (Marist); Jen Fay – 47 (Quinnipiac); Rebekah Hand – 47 (Marist)
- Television: ESPNU/ESPN3

2017–18 MAAC women's basketball standings
	Conf.				Overall
Team	W		L	PCT	W		L	PCT
Quinnipiac †	18	–	0	1.000	28	–	6	.824
Marist	14	–	4	.778	20	–	14	.588
Siena	11	–	7	.611	17	–	14	.548
Rider	10	–	8	.556	14	–	17	.452
Fairfield	10	–	8	.556	13	–	17	.433
Manhattan	9	–	9	.500	13	–	18	.419
Niagara	9	–	9	.500	13	–	18	.419
Canisius	8	–	10	.444	10	–	20	.333
Monmouth	7	–	11	.389	10	–	21	.323
Iona	2	–	16	.111	2	–	28	.067
Saint Peter's	1	–	17	.056	4	–	26	.133
† 2018 MAAC tournament winner As of March 19, 2018; Rankings from AP poll

The 2018 Metro Atlantic Athletic Conference women's basketball tournament was held March 1–5 at the Times Union Center in Albany, New York. Quinnipiac received an automatic trip to the 2018 Women's NCAA tournament.

== Seeds ==
Teams are seeded by conference record, with a ties broken by record between the tied teams followed by record against the regular-season champion, if record against regular season champion is tied, the tie breaker moves on to the regular season second place team, then third place team, etc.

Seed	School	Conference	Tiebreaker
1	Quinnipiac	18–0	
2	Marist	14–4	
3	Siena	11–7	
4	Fairfield	10–8	1–1 v. Siena
5	Rider	10–8	0–1 v. Siena
6	Niagara	9–9	2–0 v. Siena
7	Manhattan	9–9	0–2 v. Siena
8	Canisius	8–10	
9	Monmouth	7–11	
10	Iona	2–16	
11	St. Peter's	1–17	

== Schedule ==
Session	Game	Time*	Matchup^{#}	Score	Television	Attendance
First round – Thursday, March 1
1	1	9:30 AM	#8 Canisius v. #9 Monmouth	58–61	ESPN3	
1	2	11:30 AM	#7 Manhattan v. #10 Iona	55–39	ESPN3	
1	3	1:30 PM	#6 Niagara v. #11 St. Peter's	60–48	ESPN3	
Quarterfinals – Friday, March 2
2	4	1:00 PM	#1 Quinnipiac v. #9 Monmouth	83–44	ESPN3	
2	5	3:30 PM	#2 Marist v. #7 Manhattan	84–60	ESPN3	
Quarterfinals – Saturday, March 3
3	6	12:00 PM	#3 Siena v. #6 Niagara	71–60	ESPN3	
3	7	2:30 PM	#4 Fairfield v. #5 Rider	64–71	ESPN3	
Semifinals – Sunday, March 4
4	8	11:00 AM	#1 Quinnipiac v. #5 Rider	82–62	ESPN3	2,208
4	9	1:30 PM	#2 Marist v. #3 Siena	67–51	ESPN3	2,208
Championship – Monday, March 5
5	10	2:30 PM	#1 Quinnipiac vs #2 Marist	67–58	ESPNU	2,437
*Game times in ET. #-Rankings denote tournament seeding.

== Bracket ==
- All times are Eastern.

First round Thursday, March 1 ESPN3
8	Canisius	58
9	Monmouth	61
7	Manhattan	55
10	Iona	39
6	Niagara	60
11	Saint Peter's	48

Quarterfinals; Friday, March 2 Saturday, March 3 ESPN3
1	Quinnipiac	83
9	Monmouth	44
4	Fairfield	64
5	Rider	71
2	Marist	84
7	Manhattan	60
3	Siena	71
6	Niagara	60

Semifinals; Sunday, March 4 ESPN3
1	Quinnipiac	82
5	Rider	62
2	Marist	67
3	Siena	51

Championship; Monday, March 5 ESPNU
1	Quinnipiac	67
2	Marist	58

== See also ==
- Metro Atlantic Athletic Conference
- MAAC women's basketball tournament
- 2018 MAAC men's basketball tournament
