= Saint Peter's Peacocks women's basketball =

Women's college basketball team

2025–26 Saint Peter's Peacocks women's basketball team
- University: Saint Peter's University
- First season: 1967–68
- Head coach: Jennifer Leedham (3rd season)
- Location: Jersey City, New Jersey
- Arena: Run Baby Run Arena (capacity: 3,200)
- Conference: MAAC
- Nickname: Peacocks
- Colors: Blue and white

NCAA Division I tournament appearances
- 1982, 1992, 1993, 1997, 1999, 2000, 2002

AIAW tournament second round
- 1980 *at Division II level

AIAW tournament appearances
- 1980 *at Division II level

Conference tournament champions
- 1982, 1983, 1984, 1992, 1993, 1997, 1999, 2000, 2002

Conference regular-season champions
- 1982, 1983, 1984, 1985, 1986, 1990, 1993, 1995, 1996, 1997

Uniforms
Home	Away

The Saint Peter's Peacocks women's basketball team is the NCAA Division I intercollegiate women's basketball team that represents Saint Peter's University in Jersey City, New Jersey. The school's team currently competes in the Metro Atlantic Athletic Conference (MAAC) and plays their home games in Run Baby Run Arena. They are currently led by second-year head coach Jennifer Leedham. The Peacocks have appeared in the NCAA Women's tournament seven times. As with the other women's athletic programs of Saint Peter's University, they were previously known as the Peahens.

== History ==
Saint Peter's University is one of the founding members of the Metro Atlantic Athletic Conference (MAAC), which began play in women's basketball with the 1981–82 season. Since then, the Peacocks have compiled the second most wins of any MAAC women's team and have won the MAAC Women's Championship nine times (1982, 1983, 1984, 1992, 1993, 1997, 1999, 2000, 2002), the second most all-time. Prior to joining the MAAC, the Peacocks competed in the Association for Intercollegiate Athletics for Women (AIAW) from 1971 to 1981 at the Division II level.

In 2021, led by head coach Marc Mitchell, the Peacocks made a spirited run to the MAAC Championship game after a 19-year absence. They were matched up against their long time MAAC rival, the No. 1 Marist Red Foxes in a bid to win their first MAAC Championship, tenth overall, and first appearance in the NCAA Tournament since 2002. The Red Foxes would go on to defeat the Peacocks 69–30 to win their eleventh MAAC title.

== Postseason ==
=== NCAA Division I ===
The Peacocks have made seven appearances in the NCAA Tournament. They have a record of 0–7.

Year	Seed	Round	Opponent	Result
1982	#8	First Round	#1 Old Dominion	L 42–75
1992	#11	First Round	#6 Connecticut	L 66–83
1993	#12	First Round	#5 Miami (FL)	L 44–61
1997	#15	First Round	#2 Louisiana Tech	L 50–94
1999	#13	First Round	#4 Virginia Tech	L 48–73
2000	#14	First Round	#3 Mississippi State	L 60–94
2002	#11	First Round	#6 Cincinnati	L 63–76^{OT}

=== AIAW Small College/Division II ===
The Peacocks made one appearance in the AIAW National Division II women's basketball tournament, with a combined record of 1–1.

Year	Round	Opponent	Result
1980	First Round; Second Round	Niagara; College of Charleston	W 75–55; L 58–75

== Coaches ==
Head coach Mike Granelli led the Peacocks during their greatest period of success which spanned three decades and the jump from Division II to Division I level competition. During Granelli's 32 years (1972–2004) as the Peacocks head coach, Saint Peter's won 607 games, nine MAAC titles and appeared in seven NCAA tournaments. Saint Peter's best single season record during that span was 26–3 in the 1985–86 season. Granelli was only the third head coach in women's college basketball history to win 600 games at one school and was the first male head coach to win 600 games. He also became ninth head coach in Division I history to win 600 games.

The following is a list of Saint Peter's Peacocks women's basketball head coaches.

Tenure	Coach	Years	Record	Pct.
1967–1970	Theresa Cafiero	3	14–11	.560
1970–1971	Ed Strong	1	8–6	.571
1971–1972	Ed Strong/ Kevin McDermott	1	12–6	.667
1972–2004	Mike Granelli	32	607–249	.709
2004–2013	Stephanie DeWolfe	9	92–175	.345
2013–2018	Pat Coyle	5	19–132	.126
2018–2022	Marc Mitchell	4	41–78	.345
2022–present	Jennifer Leedham	2	7–53	.117
