= 2019 MAAC women's basketball tournament =

- Classification: Division I
- Season: 2018–19
- Teams: 11
- Site: Times Union Center; Albany, New York
- Champions: Quinnipiac (5th title)
- Winning coach: Tricia Fabbri (5th title)
- MVP: Jen Fay (Quinnipiac)
- Top scorers: Grace Vander Weide – 52 (Marist); Jen Fay – 49 (Quinnipiac)
- Television: ESPNU, ESPN3

2018–19 MAAC women's basketball standings
	Conf.				Overall
Team	W		L	PCT	W		L	PCT
Quinnipiac †	18	–	0	1.000	26	–	7	.788
Rider	14	–	4	.778	19	–	13	.594
Marist	13	–	5	.722	23	–	10	.697
Monmouth	9	–	9	.500	14	–	17	.452
Canisius	9	–	9	.500	11	–	19	.367
Manhattan	9	–	9	.500	12	–	19	.387
Siena	8	–	10	.444	12	–	18	.400
Niagara	8	–	10	.444	12	–	19	.387
Fairfield	7	–	11	.389	11	–	20	.355
Iona	3	–	15	.167	5	–	26	.161
Saint Peter's	1	–	17	.056	6	–	24	.200
† 2019 MAAC tournament winner As of March 23, 2019; Rankings from AP poll

The 2019 Metro Atlantic Athletic Conference women's basketball tournament was the postseason women's basketball tournament for the Metro Atlantic Athletic Conference for the 2018–19 NCAA Division I women's basketball season. It was held March 7–11, 2019, at the Times Union Center in Albany, New York. Top seeded Quinnipiac defeated #3 seed Marist 81–51 for their third straight MAAC Tournament championship.

== Seeds ==
All 11 teams in the conference participated in the Tournament. The top five teams received byes to the quarterfinals. Teams were seeded by record within the conference, with a tiebreaker system to seed teams with identical conference records.

Seed	School	Conference	Tiebreaker
1	Quinnipiac	18–0	
2	Rider	14–4	
3	Marist	13–5	
4	Monmouth	9–9	2–1 vs Can/Man
5	Canisius	9–9	2–2 vs Mon/Man
6	Manhattan	9–9	1–2 vs Mon/Can
7	Siena	8–10	1–0 vs Niagara
8	Niagara	8–10	0–1 vs Siena
9	Fairfield	7–11	
10	Iona	3–15	
11	Saint Peter's	1–17	

== Schedule ==
Session	Game	Time*	Matchup	Score	Television
First round – Thursday, March 7
1	1	9:30 a.m.	(8) Niagara vs (9) Fairfield	69–74	ESPN3
1	2	11:30 a.m	(7) Siena vs (10) Iona	64–75	ESPN3
1	3	1:30 p.m.	(6) Manhattan vs (11) Saint Peter's	62–41	ESPN3
Quarterfinals – Friday, March 8
2	4	1:00 p.m.	(1) Quinnipiac vs (9) Fairfield	63–48	ESPN3
2	5	3:30 p.m.	(2) Rider vs (10) Iona	54–46	ESPN3
Quarterfinals – Saturday, March 9
3	6	12:00 p.m.	(3) Marist vs (6) Manhattan	65–51	ESPN3
3	7	2:30 p.m.	(4) Monmouth vs (5) Canisius	64–53	ESPN3
Semifinals – Sunday, March 10
4	8	11:00 a.m.	(1) Quinnipiac vs (4) Monmouth	80–42	ESPN3
4	9	1:30 p.m.	(2) Rider vs (3) Marist	52–62	ESPN3
Championship – Monday, March 11
5	10	2:30 p.m.	(1) Quinnipiac vs (3) Marist	81–51	ESPNU
*Game times in ET. #-Rankings denote tournament seeding.

== Bracket ==
First round Thursday, March 7 ESPN3
8	Niagara	69
9	Fairfield	74
7	Siena	64
10	Iona	75
6	Manhattan	62
11	Saint Peter's	41

Quarterfinals; Friday/Saturday, March 8/9; ESPN3
1	Quinnipiac	63
9	Fairfield	48
4	Monmouth	64
5	Canisius	53
2	Rider	54
10	Iona	46
3	Marist	65
6	Manhattan	51

Semifinals; Sunday, March 10; ESPN3
1	Quinnipiac	80
4	Monmouth	42
2	Rider	52
3	Marist	62

Championship; Monday, March 11; ESPNU
1	Quinnipiac	81
3	Marist	51

== See also ==
- 2019 MAAC men's basketball tournament
