= 2021 MAAC women's basketball tournament =

- Classification: Division I
- Season: 2020–21
- Teams: 10
- Site: Jim Whelan Boardwalk Hall; Atlantic City, New Jersey
- Champions: Marist Red Foxes (11th title)
- Winning coach: Brian Giorgis (11th title)
- MVP: Willow Duffell (Marist)
- Top scorer: Willow Duffell (Marist) (51 points)
- Television: ESPN+, ESPNews

2020–21 MAAC women's basketball standings
| | Conf. | | | | Overall |
| Team | W | | L | PCT | W | | L | PCT |
|---|---|---|---|---|---|---|---|---|
| Marist † | 13 | – | 3 | .813 | 18 | – | 4 | .818 |
| Quinnipiac | 11 | – | 5 | .688 | 13 | – | 8 | .619 |
| Saint Peter's | 10 | – | 9 | .526 | 13 | – | 15 | .464 |
| Fairfield | 9 | – | 3 | .750 | 11 | – | 5 | .688 |
| Manhattan | 9 | – | 3 | .750 | 11 | – | 9 | .550 |
| Iona | 5 | – | 6 | .455 | 6 | – | 9 | .400 |
| Rider | 5 | – | 13 | .278 | 8 | – | 18 | .308 |
| Niagara | 4 | – | 6 | .400 | 4 | – | 7 | .364 |
| Siena | 3 | – | 8 | .273 | 4 | – | 9 | .308 |
| Monmouth | 2 | – | 11 | .154 | 2 | – | 16 | .111 |
| Canisius | 0 | – | 4 | .000 | 0 | – | 5 | .000 |
† 2021 MAAC tournament winner Notes: The MAAC has ordered standings based on league wins, not winning percentage, since all teams will not reach 20 conference games played. These standings are also used for seeding purposes in the 2021 MAAC Tournament. Canisius suspended their season on February 4, 2021; As of July 7, 2024; Rankings from AP poll

The 2021 Metro Atlantic Athletic Conference women's basketball tournament is the postseason women's basketball tournament for the Metro Atlantic Athletic Conference for the 2020–21 NCAA Division I women's basketball season. The tournament is scheduled to be played from March 9–13, 2021, at the Jim Whelan Boardwalk Hall in Atlantic City, New Jersey for the second year in a row. Since the tournament was never actually completed the year prior, the defending champions are the Quinnipiac Bobcats.

== Seeds ==
All of the MAAC, teams except for Canisius, participated in the tournament. Canisius cancelled their season after going 0-5, so they did not compete in the conference tournament. New procedures took effect for this season, as it was official that not all MAAC teams would reach the originally scheduled 20 conference game mark. Team seeding was based on overall conference regular season wins – not including any third games scheduled between teams in lieu of non-conference opponents. A tiebreaker system to seed teams with identical conference records was also used. The top six teams received byes to the quarterfinals.

| Seed | School | Conference | Tiebreaker 1 | Tiebreaker 2 |
|---|---|---|---|---|
| 1 | Marist | 13–3 | | |
| 2 | Quinnipiac | 11–5 | | |
| 3 | Saint Peter's | 10–10 | | |
| 4 | Fairfield | 9–3 | 1 win vs Marist | |
| 5 | Manhattan | 9–3 | 0 wins vs Marist | |
| 6 | Iona | 5–6 | 2 wins vs Rider | |
| 7 | Rider | 5–13 | 0 wins vs Iona | |
| 8 | Niagara | 4–6 | | |
| 9 | Siena | 3–8 | | |
| 10 | Monmouth | 2–11 | | |

== Schedule ==
| Session | Game | Time* | Matchup | Score | Attendance | Television |
First round – Tuesday, March 9
| 1 | 1 | 12:00 pm | No. 8 Niagara vs No. 9 Siena | 65–74 | | ESPN+ |
| 1 | 2 | 2:30 pm | No. 7 Rider vs No. 10 Monmouth | 44–41 | | ESPN+ |
Quarterfinals – Wednesday, March 10
| 2 | 3 | 12:00 pm | No. 1 Marist vs No. 9 Siena | 63–55 | | ESPN+ |
| 2 | 4 | 2:30 pm | No. 2 Quinnipiac vs No. 7 Rider | 50–62 | | ESPN+ |
Quarterfinals – Thursday, March 11
| 3 | 5 | 12:00 pm | No. 3 Saint Peter's vs No. 6 Iona | 61–50 | | ESPN+ |
| 3 | 6 | 2:30 pm | No. 4 Fairfield vs No. 5 Manhattan | 51–40 | | ESPN+ |
Semifinals – Friday, March 12
| 4 | 7 | 11:00 am | No. 1 Marist vs No. 4 Fairfield | 66–50 | | ESPN+ |
| 4 | 8 | 1:30 pm | No. 7 Rider vs No. 3 Saint Peter's | 67–72 | | ESPN+ |
Championship – Saturday, March 13
| 5 | 9 | 11:00 am | No. 1 Marist vs No. 3 Saint Peter's | 69–30 | | ESPNews |
*Game times in ET. ()-Rankings denote tournament seeding.

== Bracket ==
First round Tuesday, March 9
8 | Niagara | 65
9 | Siena | 74
7 | Rider | 44
10 | Monmouth | 41

Quarterfinals; Wednesday/Thursday, March 10/11
1 | Marist | 63
9 | Siena | 55
4 | Fairfield | 51
5 | Manhattan | 40
2 | Quinnipiac | 50
7 | Rider | 62
3 | Saint Peter's | 61
6 | Iona | 50

Semifinals; Friday, March 12
1 | Marist | 66
4 | Fairfield | 50
7 | Rider | 67
3 | Saint Peter's | 72

Championship; Saturday, March 13
1 | Marist | 69
3 | Saint Peter's | 30

* denotes number of overtimes

== All-championship team ==
2021 MAAC Women's Basketball All-Championship Team
- Makayla Firebaugh, Rider
- Lou Lopez-Senechal, Fairfield
- Taiah Thompson, Saint Peter's
- Ajia James, Saint Peter's
- Allie Best, Marist
- Caitlin Weimar, Marist
- ^{MVP} Willow Duffell, Marist

== See also ==
- 2021 MAAC men's basketball tournament
