= Concord, Ohio =

Unincorporated community in Ohio, U.S.

Coordinates: 39°1′28″N 84°16′32″W

Concord is an unincorporated community in Williamsburg township in Clermont County, in the U.S. state of Ohio.

== History ==
The first settlement at Concord was made in 1815. The post office at Concord was called Angola. This post office was established in 1855, and closed in 1872.
