= Liceo Scientifico "G. Marconi" (Milan) =

Coordinates: 45.4505°N 9.1277°E

Liceo Scientifico e Linguistico "Guglielmo Marconi" (Italian pronunciation: [liˈtʃɛːo ʃʃenˈtiːfiko e lliŋˈɡwistiko ɡuʎˈʎɛlmo marˈkoːni]) is a senior high school in Milan, Italy.

It was established as a branch of the Liceo Scientifico Einstein in the 1968–1969 school year. It became independent in the 1970–1971 school year. It was known as the "VII Liceo Scientifico," and later the "IX Liceo Scientifico," before becoming the "Liceo Scientifico “Guglielmo Marconi”" in the 1986–1987 school year. It maintained its main campus on Via dei Giacinti and its annex at Via dei Narcisi in until the 2006–2007 school year, when it moved to Via dei Narcisi, 5. It acquired an annex at U. Pisa 5/2 in the 2012–2013 school year. A linguistic high school division was established in the 2013–2014 school year, and so the school is now known under its current name.
