= Brian Giorgis =

American basketball player-coach (born 1955)

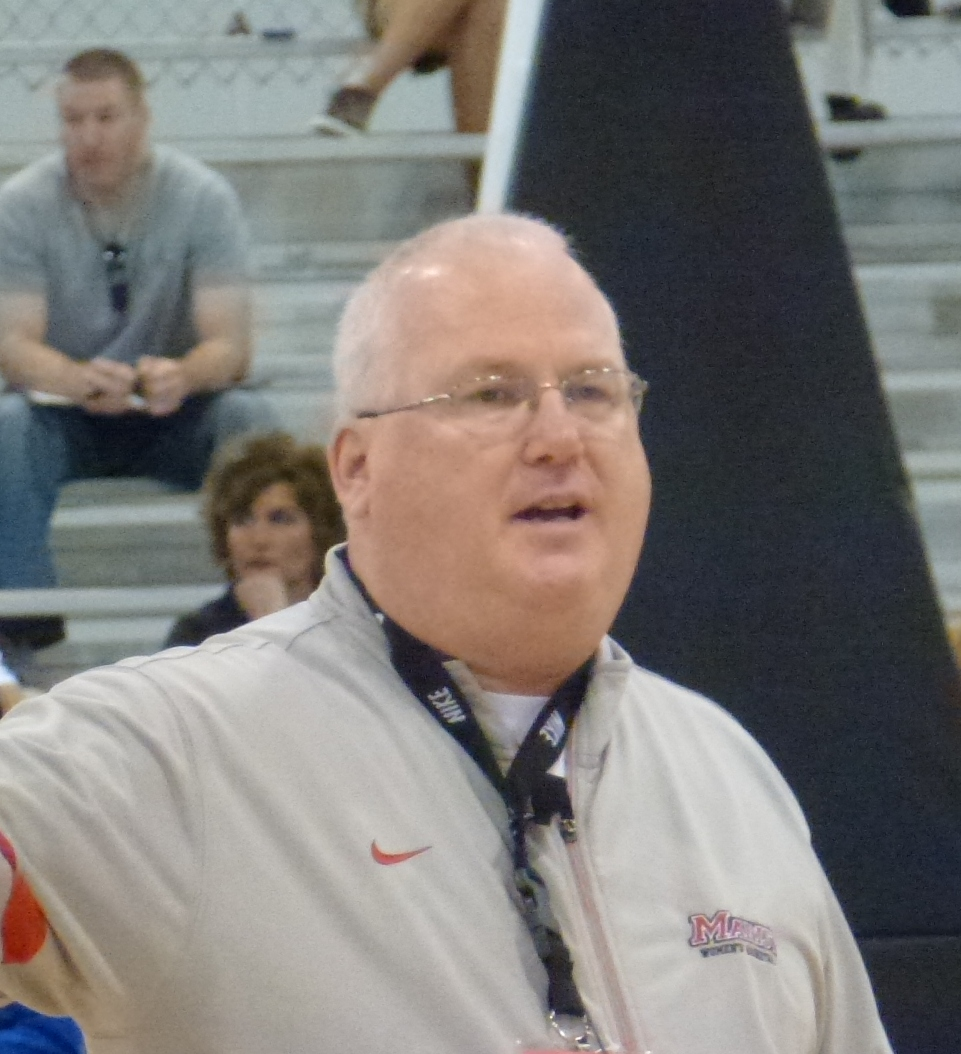
- Giorgis in 2012

Biographical details
- Born: May 29, 1955 (age 71); Schenectady, New York, U.S.
- Education: SUNY Cortland ('77); Virginia Tech ('82)

Coaching career (HC unless noted)
- 2002–2023: Marist

Head coaching record
- Overall: 463–201 (.697)

Accomplishments and honors

Championships
- 13× MAAC Regular Season Championship (2004–2014, 2020, 2021); 11× MAAC Tournament Championship (2004, 2006–2014, 2021)

Awards
- 8× MAAC Coach of the Year (2004–2006, 2008, 2011–2013, 2021); 2020 Kay Yow Award
Medal record
Coach for Women's Basketball
United States (assistant coach)
World University Games
Gold medal – first place	2013 Kazan	Team

Brian Giorgis (born May 29, 1955) is a retired head coach of the Marist Red Foxes women's basketball program, having completed twenty-one seasons as head coach, from 2002 to 2023.

His 250th career win at Marist, which came in March 2012, coincided with his players notching the Red Foxes' 7th Metro Atlantic Athletic Conference (MAAC) crown, and their eighth conference crown since 2004.

In 2007, Giorgis coached the Red Foxes through two NCAA Tournament victories, thus becoming the first-ever MAAC program to appear in the women's Round of 16.

On February 28, 2022, Giorgis announced his retirement, effective after the 2022–23 season. His top assistant Erin Doughty, who played under him at Marist, was designated as his successor.

== Early life ==
Giorgis was born in Schenectady, one of his parents' six children. His father worked for General Electric. He was raised in Scotia, New York until the family moved to Syracuse where he attended and played several sports at Cicero High School. He was a goalie for the Cortland Red Dragons men's soccer team before injuring his back.

== Career ==
Giorgis graduated from SUNY Cortland with a bachelor's degree in health education in 1977, and earned a master's degree from Virginia Tech in 1982.

Before his time at Marist, Giorgis built a powerhouse for 19 seasons coaching high-school girls' basketball, as well as other sports, and as a teacher of biology and health at Our Lady of Lourdes High School in Poughkeepsie, NY. Giorgis led the Lourdes girls' basketball team to four consecutive state championships during his tenure as coach, and he compiled a 451–44 record. He is the only coach in New York scholastic sports history to bring teams in four different sports to the state Final Four, as he also led Lourdes' baseball, softball and volleyball teams.

In November 2025, Our Lady of Lourdes High School announced they plan to dedicate its gymnasium in his honor, in a ceremony to take place in December 2025.

=== Marist College Women's Basketball Head Coach (2002–2023) ===
In 2002, he was hired as head coach at nearby Marist College. Giorgis had much success with the Marist women's program, and spent his entire Division I coaching career there.

== Head coaching record ==
Record table
Season	Team	Overall	Conference	Standing	Postseason
Marist Red Foxes (Metro Atlantic Athletic Conference) (2002–2023)
2002–03	Marist	13–16	8–10	7th	
2003–04	Marist	20–11	13–5	T–1st	NCAA First Round
2004–05	Marist	22–7	15–3	1st	
2005–06	Marist	23–7	16–2	1st	NCAA First Round
2006–07	Marist	29–6	17–1	1st	NCAA Sweet Sixteen
2007–08	Marist	32–3	18–0	1st	NCAA Second Round
2008–09	Marist	29–4	16–2	1st	NCAA First Round
2009–10	Marist	26–8	15–3	1st	NCAA First Round
2010–11	Marist	31–3	18–0	1st	NCAA Second Round
2011–12	Marist	26–8	17–1	1st	NCAA Second Round
2012–13	Marist	26–7	18–0	1st	NCAA First Round
2013–14	Marist	27–7	18–2	T–1st	NCAA First Round
2014–15	Marist	21–12	15–5	2nd	WNIT First Round
2015–16	Marist	16–16	14–6	3rd	
2016–17	Marist	15–17	11–9	6th	
2017–18	Marist	20–14	14–4	2nd	WNIT First Round
2018–19	Marist	23–9	13–5	3rd	
2019–20	Marist	26–4	18–2	T–1st	Season Canceled
2020–21	Marist	18–4	13–3	1st	NCAA First Round
2021–22	Marist	8–20	6–14	10th	
2022–23	Marist	12–18	8–12	7th	
Marist:		463–201 (.697)	302–88 (.774)		
Total:		463–201 (.697)			
National champion Postseason invitational champion Conference regular season champion Conference regular season and conference tournament champion Division regular season champion Division regular season and conference tournament champion Conference tournament champion
