= Marist Red Foxes women's basketball =

Women's college basketball team

2025–26 Marist Red Foxes women's basketball team
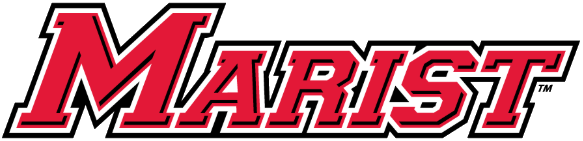
- University: Marist University
- Head coach: Erin Doughty (3rd season)
- Location: Poughkeepsie, New York, United States
- Arena: McCann Arena (capacity: 3,200)
- Conference: MAAC
- Nickname: Red Foxes
- Colors: Red and white

NCAA Division I tournament Sweet Sixteen
- 2007

NCAA Division I tournament appearances
- 2004, 2006, 2007, 2008, 2009, 2010, 2011, 2012, 2013, 2014, 2021, 2025

Conference tournament champions
- 2004, 2006, 2007, 2008, 2009, 2010, 2011, 2012, 2013, 2014, 2021, 2025

Conference regular-season champions
- 2004, 2005, 2006, 2007, 2008, 2009, 2010, 2011, 2012, 2013, 2014, 2020, 2021, 2025

Uniforms
Home	Away

The Marist Red Foxes women's basketball team is the basketball team that represents Marist University in Poughkeepsie, New York, United States. The school's team currently competes in the Metro Atlantic Athletic Conference.

== History ==
The Red Foxes had an 11-year stretch from 2004 to 2015 in which they won 10 conference tournaments (while playing in 12 conference tournaments) and won 11 regular season titles while advancing to the Sweet Sixteen in 2007. In those seasons, they only missed the NCAA Tournament twice (2005 and 2015, though they made the WNIT in the latter year).

=== NCAA Tournament appearances ===
The Red Foxes have a 5–11 record in eleven NCAA Tournament appearances.

Year	Round	Opponent	Result
2004	First Round	Oklahoma	L 45–58
2006	First Round	Georgia	L 60–75
2007	First Round; Second Round; Sweet Sixteen	Ohio State; Middle Tennessee; Tennessee	W 67–63; W 73–59; L 46–65
2008	First Round; Second Round	DePaul; LSU	W 76–57; L 49–68
2009	First Round	Virginia	L 61–68
2010	First Round	Georgetown	L 42–62
2011	First Round; Second Round	Iowa State; Duke	W 74–64; L 66–71
2012	First Round; Second Round	Georgia; St. Bonaventure	W 76–70; L 63–66
2013	First Round	Michigan State	L 47–55
2014	First Round	Iowa	L 65–87
2021	First Round	Louisville	L 43–74

=== WNIT appearances ===
The Red Foxes are 0–2 in WNIT appearances.

Year	Round	Opponent	Result
2015	First Round	Temple	L 54–67
2018	First Round	St. John's	L 47–68

== Year-by-year results ==
Division I only

Record table
Season	Team	Overall	Conference	Standing	Postseason
Hudson Valley Women's Athletic Conference
Susan Deer (1981–83)
1981–82	Marist Red Foxes	21–10	10–0	1st	
Cosmopolitan Conference
1982–83	Marist Red Foxes	14–14	2–3	T–4th	
Susan Deer:		35–24 (.593)	12–3 (.800)		
Patty Torza (1983–86)
1983–84	Marist Red Foxes	12–17	6–8	5th	
1984–85	Marist Red Foxes	16–14	7–7	4th	
1985–86	Marist Red Foxes	12–17	9–5	T–2nd	
Patty Torza:		40–48 (.455)	22–20 (.524)		
ECAC Metro
Ken Babineau (1986–98)
1986–87	Marist Red Foxes	7–20	5–11	T–6th	
1987–88	Marist Red Foxes	9–19	6–10	5th	
Northeast Conference
1988–89	Marist Red Foxes	13–15	11–5	T–3rd	
1989–90	Marist Red Foxes	18–10	12–4	2nd	
1990–91	Marist Red Foxes	15–13	10–6	3rd	
1991–92	Marist Red Foxes	10–18	9–7	3rd	
1992–93	Marist Red Foxes	19–10	12–6	4th	
1993–94	Marist Red Foxes	11–16	10–8	5th	
1994–95	Marist Red Foxes	10–17	7–11	T–3rd	
1995–96	Marist Red Foxes	14–17	8–10	T–6th	
1996–97	Marist Red Foxes	9–18	6–12	9th	
Metro Atlantic Athletic Conference
1997–98	Marist Red Foxes	5–22	3–15	9th	
Ken Babineau:		140–195 (.418)	99–105 (.485)		
Kristin Lamb (1998–02)
1998–99	Marist Red Foxes	4–23	3–15	10th	
1999–00	Marist Red Foxes	11–17	4–14	10th	
2000–01	Marist Red Foxes	6–22	5–13	T–8th	
2001–02	Marist Red Foxes	11–17	7–11	T–6th	
Kristin Lamb:		32–79 (.288)	19–53 (.264)		
Brian Giorgis (2002–2023)
2002–03	Marist	13–16	8–10	7th	
2003–04	Marist	20–11	13–5	T–1st	NCAA Round of 64
2004–05	Marist	22–7	15–3	1st	
2005–06	Marist	23–7	16–2	1st	NCAA Round of 64
2006–07	Marist	29–6	17–1	1st	NCAA Sweet 16
2007–08	Marist	32–3	18–0	1st	NCAA Round of 32
2008–09	Marist	29–4	16–2	1st	NCAA Round of 64
2009–10	Marist	26–8	15–3	1st	NCAA Round of 64
2010–11	Marist	31–3	18–0	1st	NCAA Round of 32
2011–12	Marist	26–8	17–1	1st	NCAA Round of 32
2012–13	Marist	26–7	18–0	1st	NCAA Round of 64
2013–14	Marist	27–7	18–2	T–1st	NCAA Round of 64
2014–15	Marist	21–12	15–5	2nd	WNIT First Round
2015–16	Marist	16–16	14–6	3rd	
2016–17	Marist	15–17	11–9	6th	
2017–18	Marist	20–14	14–4	2nd	WNIT First Round
2018–19	Marist	23–10	13–5	3rd	
2019–20	Marist	26–4	18–2	T–1st	Season Canceled
2020–21	Marist	18–4	13–3	1st	NCAA Round of 64
2021–22	Marist	8–21	6–14	10th	
2022–23	Marist	12–18	8–12	7th	
Brian Giorgis:		463–201 (.697)	302–89 (.772)		
Erin Doughty (2023–present)
2023–24	Marist	6–25	4–16	11th	
2024–25	Marist	16–15	11–9	5th	
2025–26	Marist	11–20	8–12	9th	
2026–27	Marist	1–4	0–0		
Erin Doughty:		34–64 (.347)	23–37 (.383)		
Total:		738–584 (.558)			
National champion Postseason invitational champion Conference regular season champion Conference regular season and conference tournament champion Division regular season champion Division regular season and conference tournament champion Conference tournament champion

== Records ==
Active players in italics. *As of March 19, 2021
Note: Free throw percentage list is Min 100 made/2 seasons played

=== Career scoring leaders ===
Name	Points
Rachele Fitz	2,447
Rebekah Hand	1,994
Ursula Winter	1,587
Alana Gilmer	1,518
Stacey Dengler	1,481
Sydney Coffey	1,478
Corielle Yarde	1,470
Julianne Viani	1,447
Charlene Fields	1,436
Erica Allenspach	1,416

=== Career rebound leaders ===
Name	Rebounds
Rachele Fitz	1,066
Stacey Dengler	888
Lori Keys	860
Danielle Galameau	833
Rebekah Hand	768
Ursula Winter	762
Willow Duffell	730
Tori Jarosz	714
Stephanie Del Preore	709
Corielle Yarde	688

=== Career assist leaders ===
Name	Assists
Alisa Kresge	596
Nina Vecchio	563
Grace Vanderweide	446
Julianne Viani	441
Beth Shackel	437
Erica Allenspach	371
Rebekah Hand	358
Lynne Griffin	355
Allie Best	354
Casey Dulin	341

=== Career blocked shots leaders ===
Name	Blocks
Tori Jarosz	186
Diesa Seidel	162
Meg Dahlman	131
Rachele Fitz	127
Mary Jo Stempsey	110
Lovísa Henningsdóttir	101
Kristen Keller	94
Corielle Yarde	91
Brandy Gang	89
Kate Oliver	88

=== Career steals leaders ===
Name	Steals
Lynne Griffin	240
Alisa Kresge	222
Erica Allenspach	207
Diana Jones	197
Beth Shackel	196
Amy Presnall	195
Valerie Wilmer	193
Leanne Ockenden	186
Charlene Fields	183
Danielle Galarneau	181

=== Career three-point leaders ===
Name	3P Made
Jean-Marie Lesko	249
Rebekah Hand	247
Marie Fusci	242
Julianne Viani	224
Leanne Ockenden	207
Erica Allenspach	187
Corielle Yarde	173
Madeline Blais	164
Sydney Coffey	158
Nancy Holbrook	130

=== Career free throw pct. leaders ===
Name	M-A Pct
Kristina Danella	162–181 .895
Rebekah Hand	385–424 .887
Madeline Blais	213–243 .876
Rachele Fitz	492–581 .847
Erica Allenspach	321–391 .821
Nikki Flores	305–377 .809
Elisha De Jesus	147–184 .825
Sabrina Vallery	409–512 .799
Brandy Gang	203–255 .796
Jennifer O'Neil	133–167 .796

=== Career free throw leaders ===
Name	FT Made
Rachele Fitz	663
Sydney Coffey	482
Sabrina Vallery	409
Rebekah Hand	385
Ursula Winter	373
Tori Jarosz	340
Erica Allenspach	321
Lori Keys	320
Julianne Viani	317
Nikki Flores	305

== See also ==
- Marist Red Foxes men's basketball
