= Niagara Purple Eagles women's basketball =

Niagara University women's basketball team

Niagara Purple Eagles
| 2026–27 Niagara Purple Eagles women's basketball team |
- University: Niagara University
- Head coach: Tiara Johnson (1st season)
- Location: Lewiston, New York
- Arena: Gallagher Center (capacity: 2,400)
- Conference: MAAC
- Nickname: Purple Eagles
- Colors: Purple and white

AIAW tournament Final Four
- Division II: 1979
Other AIAW tournament results
| Quarterfinals | Division II: 1979 |
| Appearances | Division II: 1979, 1980 |

WNIT appearances
- 2023, 2024

Uniforms
| Home | Away |

The Niagara Purple Eagles women's basketball team is the college basketball team that represent Niagara University in Lewiston, New York, United States. The school's team currently competes in the Metro Atlantic Athletic Conference (MAAC). They are one of over fifty teams to have never reached the NCAA Division I tournament.

== History ==
Niagara began play in 1974. They joined the MAAC in 1989. They have never made the NCAA tournament. Their brief achievements came in regional AIAWs, such as winning the New York AIAW championship in 1978 and 1980 and the Eastern AIAW in 1979, with a third-place finish in the AIAW Small College tournament. They made it to the ECAC North title game in 1986, losing to St. Anselm's 77–65 and losing to Saint Peter's 66–38 in the 1997 MAAC title game. They have reached the second round of the MAAC tournament numerous times but have never won it. As of the end of the 2015–16 season, the Purple Eagles have an all-time record of 456–575. In 2023 Niagara made history by reaching the WNIT tournament for the first time in program history. The Purple Eagles ultimately fell to Green Bay in their first appearance in the tournament, ending one of the best seasons in the history of Niagara women's basketball.

== Postseason ==
=== AIAW College Division/Division II ===
The Purple Eagles made two appearances in the AIAW national Division II basketball tournament, with a combined record of 3–2.

| Year | Round | Opponent | Result |
|---|---|---|---|
| 1979 | First round Quarterfinals; Semifinals; Third-place game | San Francisco; Charleston (WV); Dayton; Tuskegee | W, 56–52; W, 78–73; L, 59–76; W, 71–55 |
| 1980 | First round | Saint Peter's | L, 55–75 |

=== WNIT results ===
The Purple Eagles have appeared in one Women's National Invitation Tournament.

| Year | Round | Opponent | Result |
|---|---|---|---|
| 2023 | First round | Green Bay | L, 52–84 |

== Roster ==
2023–24 Niagara Purple Eagles women's basketball team
Players
Coaches

| Pos. | # | Name | Height | Year | Previous school | Hometown |
|---|---|---|---|---|---|---|
| G | 0 | Chardonnay Hartley | 5 ft 3 in (1.6 m) | So | Longwood | Harlem, New York |
| G | 1 | Shelby Fiddler | 5 ft 9 in (1.75 m) | So | Patrick Henry High School | Roanoke, Virginia |
| G | 3 | Lexie Roe | 5 ft 7 in (1.7 m) | Jr | Fayetteville–Manlius High School | Manlius, New York |
| G | 4 | Ary Hicks | 5 ft 5 in (1.65 m) | So | Charlotte High School | Punta Gorda, Florida |
| G | 5 | Aaliyah Parker | 5 ft 9 in (1.75 m) | Jr | Cardinal O'Hara High School | Cheektowaga, New York |
| F | 10 | Amelia Strong | 6 ft 2 in (1.88 m) | So | Cardinal O'Hara High School | Niagara Falls, New York |
| G | 11 | Angel Parker | 5 ft 5 in (1.65 m) | GS | Cardinal O'Hara High School | Cheektowaga, New York |
| G | 13 | Destiny Strother | 5 ft 9 in (1.75 m) | GS | Pittsburgh | Flint, Michigan |
| G/F | 14 | Alyssa Rossignol | 5 ft 11 in (1.8 m) | Fr | Enfield High School | Enfield, Connecticut |
| F | 15 | Kylie Buckley | 6 ft 1 in (1.85 m) | Fr | Livonia High School | Livonia, New York |
| G | 20 | Marlie Dickerson | 5 ft 10 in (1.78 m) | So | Central Dauphin High School | Harrisburg, Pennsylvania |
| G | 21 | Lore Porter | 5 ft 9 in (1.75 m) | Sr | New Hope Academy | Woodbridge, Virginia |
| F | 23 | Jade Rutledge | 5 ft 10 in (1.78 m) | So | Cardinal O'Hara High School | Buffalo, New York |
| F | 25 | Saige Glover | 6 ft 0 in (1.83 m) | Sr | Northland High School | Columbus, Ohio |

Head coach

- Jada Pierce (West Chester)

Assistant coach(es)

- Brianna Chambers (Cal State Bakersfield)
- Lester Harbin (Lees–McRae)
- Kayla DeCriscio (Pitt–Johnstown)

Legend

- (C) Team captain
- (S) Suspended
- (I) Ineligible
- (W) Walk-on
- Injured
- Current redshirt

Roster
Last update: February 19, 2024
