= Iona Gaels women's basketball =

Iona Gaels
2025–26 Iona Gaels women's basketball team
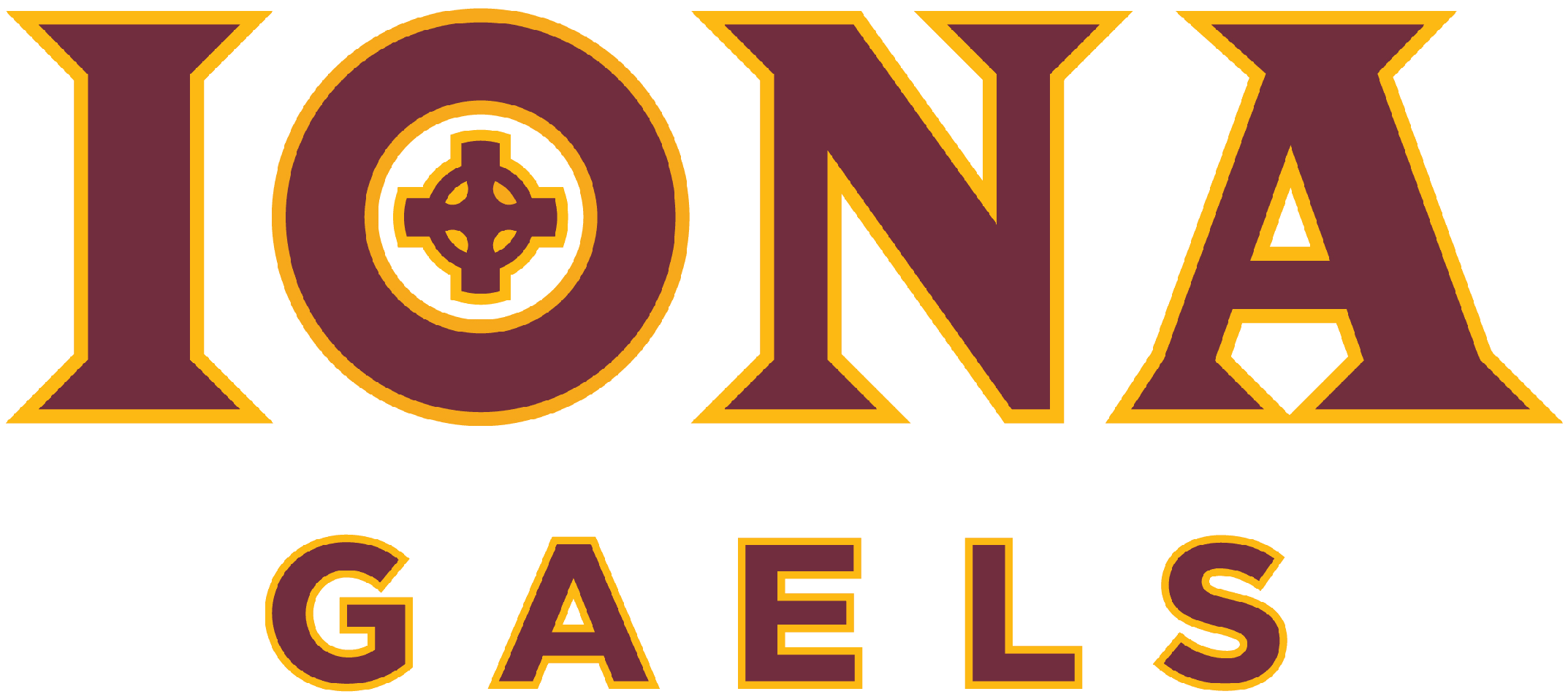
- University: Iona University
- Head coach: Angelika Szumilo (2nd season)
- Location: New Rochelle, New York
- Arena: Hynes Athletic Center (capacity: 2,611)
- Conference: MAAC
- Nickname: Gaels
- Colors: Maroon and gold

NCAA Division I tournament appearances
- 2016, 2023

Conference tournament champions
- 2016, 2023

Conference regular-season champions
- 2014, 2023

Uniforms
Home	Away

The Iona Gaels women's basketball team represents Iona University in New Rochelle, New York in NCAA Division I competition. The school's team competes in the Metro Atlantic Athletic Conference (MAAC).

== History ==
The Gaels beat Quinnipiac 79–76 to win their first ever MAAC title in 2016. They lost 74–58 to Maryland in the First Round of the 2016 NCAA Division I women's basketball tournament. They have also made the Women's National Invitation Tournament in 2007, 2008, 2010 and 2014, going to the Second Round in 2007 and 2008.

=== NCAA Division I appearances ===
The Gaels have made two NCAA Division I Tournament appearances. They have a record of 0–2.

Year	Round	Opponent	Result
2016	First Round	Maryland	L 58–74
2023	First Round	Duke	L 49–89

=== WNIT appearances ===
The Gaels have made the Women's National Invitation Tournament five times. They have a record of 2–5.

Year	Round	Opponent	Result
2007	First Round; Second Round	Long Island; Indiana	W 91–79; L 71–74
2008	First Round; Second Round	Quinnipiac; St. John's	W 71–59; L 59–65
2010	First Round	Maryland	L 53–88
2013	First Round	Drexel	L 50–59
2014	First Round	Harvard	L 89–90

== Notable players ==
- Þóranna Kika Hodge-Carr

== Notable coaches ==
- Rose Marie Battaglia
- Kent Washington
