= Manhattan Jaspers women's basketball =

Women's college basketball team

2025–26 Manhattan Jaspers women's basketball team
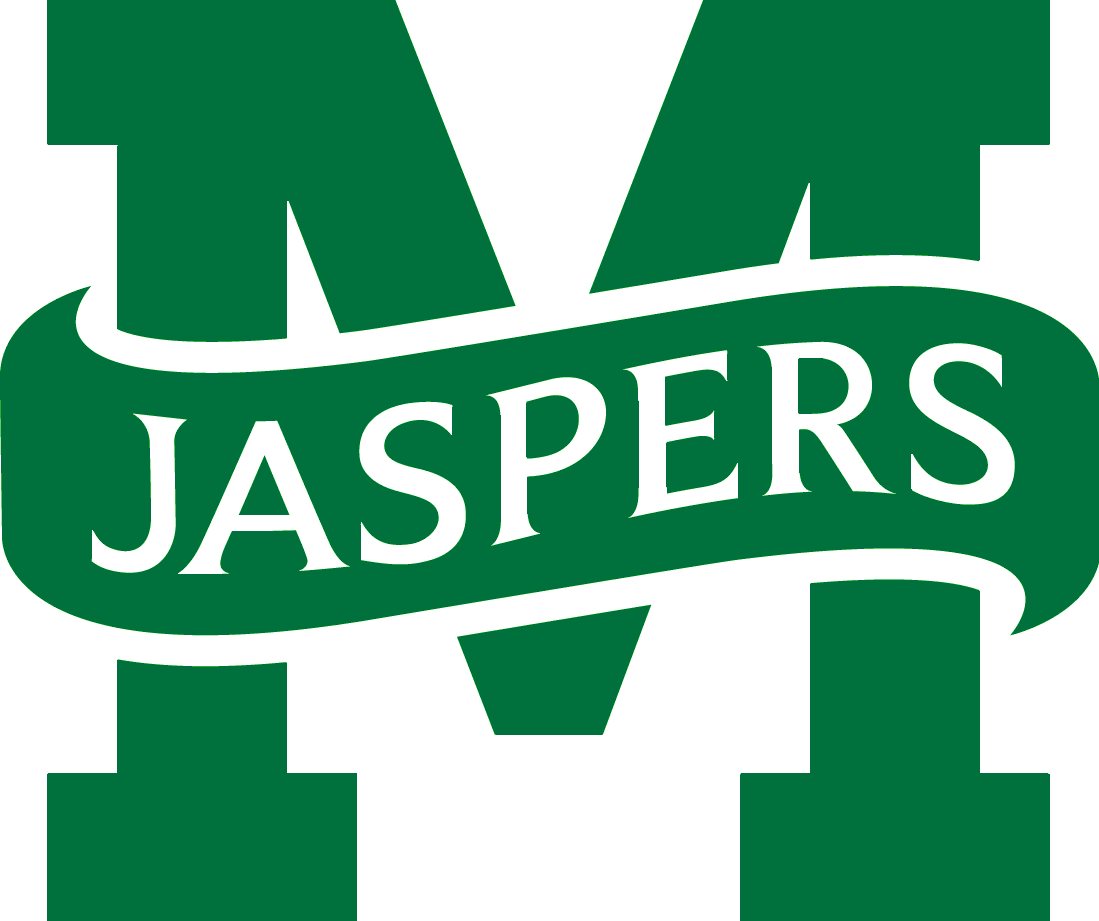
- University: Manhattan University
- Head coach: Heather Vulin (9th season)
- Location: New York City, New York
- Arena: Draddy Gymnasium (capacity: 2,345)
- Conference: MAAC
- Nickname: Lady Jaspers
- Colors: Green and white

NCAA Division I tournament appearances
- 1987, 1990, 1996, 2003

Conference tournament champions
- 1987, 1990, 1996, 2003

Conference regular-season champions
- 2003

Uniforms
Home	Away

The Manhattan Jaspers women's basketball team is the basketball team that represents Manhattan University in The Bronx, New York City, New York, United States. The school's team currently competes in the Metro Atlantic Athletic Conference.

== Postseason ==
=== NCAA Division I appearances ===
The Lady Jaspers have made four NCAA Division I Tournament appearances. They have a record of 0–4.

Year	Round	Opponent	Result
1987	First Round	Duke	L 55–70
1990	First Round	Clemson	L 55–79
1996	First Round	Virginia	L 55–100
2003	First Round	Mississippi State	L 47–73

=== WBI appearances ===
The Lady Jaspers have appeared in the Women's Basketball Invitational (WBI) twice. They have a record of 4–2.

Year	Round	Opponent	Result
2011	First Round; Second Round; Third Round	Sacred Heart; Wright State; UAB	W 52–48; W 75–73; L 43–62
2012	First Round; Second Round; Third Round	Robert Morris; Holy Cross; Minnesota	W 77–54; W 78–63; L 54–67

== See also ==
- Manhattan Jaspers and Lady Jaspers
- Manhattan Jaspers basketball
- Sports in the New York metropolitan area
