= Siena Saints women's basketball =

2025–26 Siena Saints women's basketball team
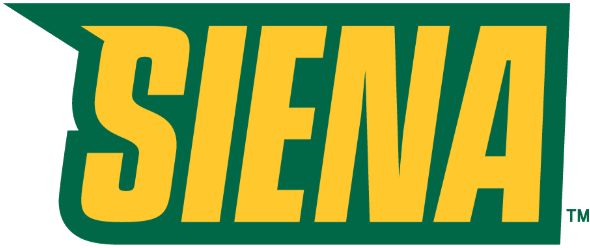
- University: Siena College
- Head coach: Terry Primm (1st season)
- Conference: MAAC
- Location: Albany, New York
- Arena: UHY Center (capacity: 2,149)
- Nickname: Saints
- Colors: Green and gold

Uniforms
Home	Away	Alternate

NCAA tournament appearances
- 2001

Conference tournament champions
- 2001

Conference regular-season champions
- 1994, 1998, 1999, 2001, 2002, 2003, 2004

The Siena Saints women's basketball team (formerly the Siena Indians) represents Siena College in Loudonville, New York, United States. The NCAA Division I program competes in the Metro Atlantic Athletic Conference.

== History ==
Siena began their first year under varsity level in 1974 after four years as a club team. They joined Division I in 1983 and the MAAC in 1989. They have made five appearances in the postseason, with one being in the NCAA Tournament (2001), three in the WNIT (1999, 2002, 2003), and one in the WBI (2015). The Saints have won the MAAC Tournament once (2001) while finishing as runner up in 1999, 2002, and 2003. In the NCAA Tournament, they lost to 98–78 to Colorado. In the WNIT, they have made the Second Round in 1999 and 2003, beating Georgetown 86-73 before losing to Wisconsin 107–85 in the former year and beating Seton Hall 66-58 before losing to Creighton 96–86 in the latter year. In the WBI, they went to the Championship, beating Stony Brook 53–46, Xavier 69–49, and Mercer 65–54 before losing to Louisiana–Lafayette 52–50. As of the end of the 2015–16 season, the Saints have an all-time record of 636–518.

== Postseason appearances ==
=== NCAA Tournament appearances ===
The Saints are 0–1 in appearances in the NCAA Division I women's basketball tournament.

Year	Round	Opponent	Result
2001	First Round	Colorado	L 78-98

=== WNIT appearances ===
The Saints have a record of 2–3 in three appearances in the Women's National Invitation Tournament.

Year	Round	Opponent	Result
1999	First Round; Second Round	Georgetown; Wisconsin	W 86-73; L 85-107
2002	First Round	St. Joseph's (PA)	L 55-84
2003	First Round; Second Round	Seton Hall; Creighton	W 66-58; L 86-96

=== WBI appearances ===
The Saints have appeared in the Women's Basketball Invitational once. They have a record of 3–1.

Year	Round	Opponent	Result
2015	First Round; Semifinals; Quarterfinals; WBI Championship Game	Stony Brook; Xavier; Mercer; Louisiana Lafayette	W 53-46; W 69-49; W 65-54; L 50-52

== See also ==
- Siena Saints men's basketball
