= 2024–25 Charleston Southern Buccaneers women's basketball team =

American college basketball season

2024–25 Charleston Southern Buccaneers women's basketball
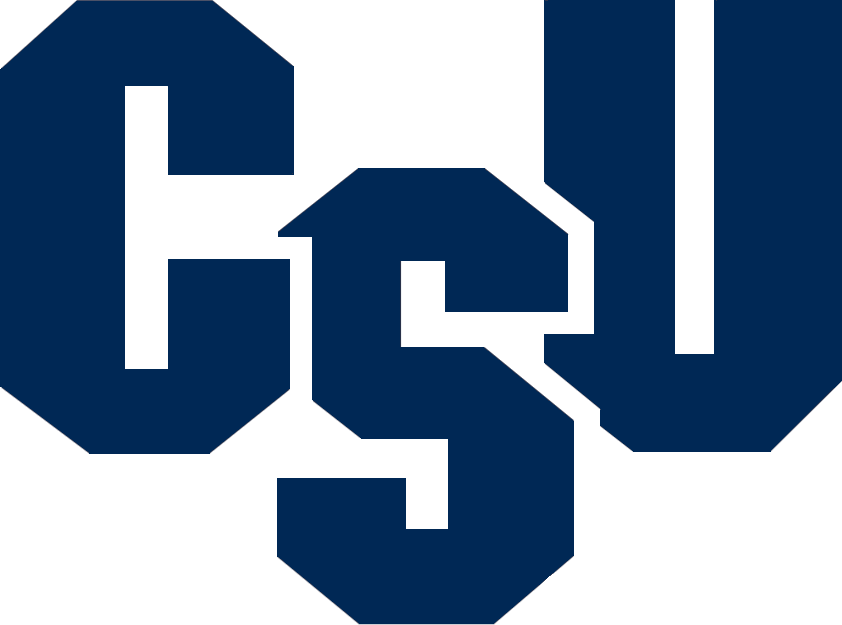
- Conference: Big South Conference
- Record: 14–16 (10–6 Big South)
- Head coach: Clarisse White (4th season)
- Associate head coach: Ashley Reddick
- Assistant coaches: Cortez Mitchell; Amir Gilliam; Lauren Bevis
- Home arena: Buccaneer Field House

2024–25 Big South women's basketball standings
	Conf.				Overall
Team	W		L	PCT	W		L	PCT
High Point †	13	–	3	.813	21	–	12	.636
Longwood	11	–	5	.688	22	–	12	.647
Radford	10	–	6	.625	14	–	17	.452
Charleston Southern	10	–	6	.625	14	–	16	.467
Winthrop	9	–	7	.563	16	–	15	.516
Gardner–Webb	8	–	8	.500	11	–	18	.379
USC Upstate	6	–	10	.375	9	–	21	.300
Presbyterian	4	–	12	.250	6	–	24	.200
UNC Asheville	1	–	15	.063	4	–	27	.129
† 2025 Big South tournament winner

The 2024–25 Charleston Southern Buccaneers women's basketball team represented Charleston Southern University during the 2024–25 NCAA Division I women's basketball season. The Buccaneers, led by fourth-year head coach Clarisse White, played their home games at the Buccaneer Field House in North Charleston, South Carolina as members of the Big South Conference.

== Previous season ==
The Buccaneers finished the 2023–24 season 11–19, 8–8 in Big South play, to finish in a three-way tie for fourth place. They were defeated by eventual tournament champions Presbyterian in the quarterfinals of the Big South tournament.

== Roster ==
2024–25 Charleston Southern Buccaneers women's basketball team
Players
Coaches

Pos.	#	Name	Height	Year	Previous school	Hometown
G	0	Mya Dotson	5 ft 10 in (1.78 m)	RS Fr	Lewisville High School	Lewisville, TX
G	1	Catherine Alben	5 ft 7 in (1.7 m)	Jr	Grayson High School	Snellville, GA
G	2	Courtney Davis	5 ft 4 in (1.63 m)	Sr	Little Rock	Warner Robins, GA
G	3	Tyonna Bailey	5 ft 10 in (1.78 m)	So	St. John's	Newark, NJ
G	4	Caelan Ellis	5 ft 6 in (1.68 m)	RS So	Buffalo	Powder Springs, GA
G	5	Taylor Caldwell	5 ft 10 in (1.78 m)	Jr	East Georgia State College	Lithia Springs, GA
G	11	Alba Garcia	6 ft 0 in (1.83 m)	Jr	IES Ortega y Gasset	Madrid, Spain
F	12	Keshunti Nichols	6 ft 0 in (1.83 m)	Sr	Pearl River Community College	Pearl, MS
G	15	Alaina Nettles	5 ft 7 in (1.7 m)	So	Cane Bay High School	Anchorage, AK
G/F	20	Madison Adamson	6 ft 0 in (1.83 m)	Sr	Air Force	Hoover, AL
G/F	21	Shimei Muhammad	6 ft 1 in (1.85 m)	Sr	Chipola College	Brooklyn, NY
F	22	Saniya Jones	6 ft 4 in (1.93 m)	Jr	Duluth High School	Tucker, GA
G	23	Maya Robinson	5 ft 9 in (1.75 m)	So	Good Better Best Academy	Raleigh, NC
F/C	25	Hailee Brennen	6 ft 3 in (1.91 m)	Jr	Florida A&M	Ormond Beach, FL
G	35	Laura Ortega	5 ft 10 in (1.78 m)	Sr	Highland Community College	San Fernando, Spain

Head coach

- Clarisse White (Villanova)

Assistant coach(es)

- Ashley Reddick (Oklahoma Wesleyan)
- Cortez Mitchell (Charleston Southern)
- Amir Gilliam (Northeastern State)
- Lauren Bevis (High Point)

Legend

- (C) Team captain
- (S) Suspended
- (I) Ineligible
- (W) Walk-on
- Injured
- Current redshirt

Roster
Last update: January 17, 2025

== Schedule and results ==
Date time, TV	Rank^{#}	Opponent^{#}	Result	Record	Site (attendance) city, state
Exhibition
October 30, 2024*; 6:00 p.m.		North Greenville	W 95–48	–	Buccaneer Field House; North Charleston, SC
Non-conference regular season
November 4, 2024*; 11:00 a.m., ACCNX		at No. 15 North Carolina	L 53–83	0–1	Carmichael Arena; Chapel Hill, NC
November 6, 2024*; 6:00 p.m., ESPN+		at East Carolina	L 56–81	0–2	Williams Arena (987); Greenville, NC
November 10, 2024*; 1:00 p.m., ESPN+		Coastal Carolina	L 53–97	0–3	Buccaneer Field House (479); North Charleston, SC
November 12, 2024*; 12:00 p.m., SECN+		at No. 7 LSU	L 44–117	0–4	Pete Maravich Assembly Center (11,095); Baton Rouge, LA
November 18, 2024*; 6:30 p.m., ESPN+		at Charlotte	W 63–59	1–4	Dale F. Halton Arena (559); Charlotte, NC
November 22, 2024*; 7:00 p.m., ESPN+		at Mercer	L 48–59	1–5	Hawkins Arena (498); Macon, GA
November 25, 2024*; 6:00 p.m., ESPN+		Fairfield	L 36–79	1–6	Buccaneer Field House (456); North Charleston, SC
November 29, 2024*; 6:00 p.m., ESPN+		North Dakota State	W 67–60	2–6	Buccaneer Field House (225); North Charleston, SC
December 1, 2024*; 1:00 p.m., ESPN+		South Alabama	W 60–55	3–6	Buccaneer Field House (156); North Charleston, SC
December 3, 2024*; 5:00 p.m., ESPN+		Charleston	L 45–86	3–7	Buccaneer Field House (356); North Charleston, SC
December 8, 2024*; 2:00 p.m., ESPN+		at Furman	L 42–58	3–8	Hayes Gymnasium (377); Tigerville, SC
December 17, 2024*; 6:30 p.m.		at South Carolina State	W 78–50	4–8	SHM Memorial Center (135); Orangeburg, SC
December 19, 2024*; 12:00 p.m., SECN+		at No. 2 South Carolina	L 46–82	4–9	Colonial Life Arena (15,154); Columbia, SC
Big South regular season
January 2, 2025; 7:00 p.m., ESPN+		at Gardner–Webb	W 67–65	5–9 (1–0)	Paul Porter Arena (50); Boiling Springs, NC
January 4, 2025; 2:00 p.m., ESPN+		Longwood	L 72–73	5–10 (1–1)	Buccaneer Field House (321); North Charleston, SC
January 8, 2025; 7:00 p.m., ESPN+		at High Point	L 51–78	5–11 (1–2)	Qubein Center (958); High Point, NC
January 15, 2025; 6:00 p.m., ESPN+		Winthrop	W 78–50	6–11 (2–2)	Buccaneer Field House (586); North Charleston, SC
January 18, 2025; 2:00 p.m., ESPN+		at Radford	L 62–74	6–12 (2–3)	Dedmon Center (643); Radford, VA
January 22, 2025; 6:00 p.m., ESPN+		Presbyterian	W 71–58	7–12 (3–3)	Buccaneer Field House (302); North Charleston, SC
January 25, 2025; 1:00 p.m., ESPN+		UNC Asheville	W 57-52	8-12 (4-3)	Buccaneer Field House (578); North Charleston, SC
January 29, 2025; 6:00 p.m., ESPN+		USC Upstate	W 62-58	9-12 (5-3)	Buccaneer Field House (485); North Charleston, SC
February 1, 2025; 6:00 p.m., ESPN+		at Longwood	W 55-50	10-12 (6-3)	Joan Perry Brock Center (1,343); Farmville, VA
February 5, 2025; 6:00 p.m., ESPN+		at Winthrop	L 47-54	10-13 (6-4)	Winthrop Coliseum (387); Rock Hill, SC
February 8, 2025; 2:00 p.m., ESPN+		Gardner–Webb	L 51-64	10-14 (6-5)	Buccaneer Field House (650); North Charleston, SC
February 12, 2025; 6:30 p.m., ESPN+		at Presbyterian	W 79-65	11-14 (7-5)	Templeton Center (612); Clinton, SC
February 15, 2025; 2:00 p.m., ESPN+		at UNC Asheville	W 60-51	12-14 (8-5)	Kimmel Arena (597); Asheville, NC
February 19, 2025; 6:00 p.m., ESPN+		High Point	L 52-68	12-15 (8-6)	Buccaneer Field House (425); North Charleston, SC
February 22, 2025; 4:00 p.m., ESPN+		at USC Upstate	W 59-49	13-15 (9-6)	G. B. Hodge Center (227); Spartanburg, SC
March 1, 2025; 2:00 p.m., ESPN+		Radford	W 60-50	14-15 (10-6)	Buccaneer Field House (650); North Charleston, SC
Big South tournament
March 6, 2025; 2:00 pm, ESPN+	(4)	vs. (5) Winthrop; Quarterfinals			Freedom Hall Civic Center; Johnson City, TN
*Non-conference game. ^{#}Rankings from AP Poll. (#) Tournament seedings in parentheses. All times are in Eastern.
