= 2024–25 Clemson Tigers women's basketball team =

Women's college basketball season

2024–25 Clemson Tigers women's basketball
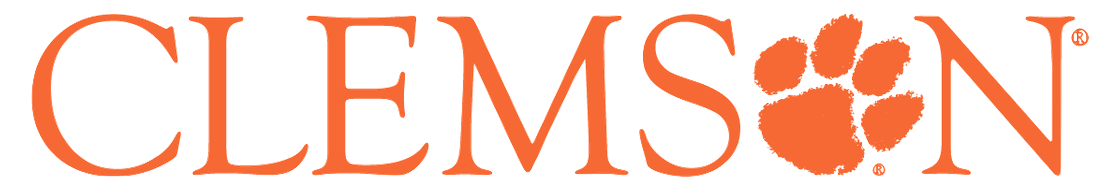
- Conference: Atlantic Coast Conference
- Record: 14–17 (6–12 ACC)
- Head coach: Shawn Poppie (1st season)
- Assistant coaches: Chris Ayers (1st season); Sydni Means (1st season); Katelyn Grisillo (1st season); Jon Goldberg (1st season); Jayda Worthy (1st season)
- Home arena: Littlejohn Coliseum

2024–25 ACC women's basketball standings
	Conf.				Overall
Team	W		L	PCT	W		L	PCT
No. 9 NC State	16	–	2	.889	28	–	7	.800
No. 8 Notre Dame	16	–	2	.889	28	–	6	.824
No. 7 Duke †	14	–	4	.778	29	–	8	.784
No. 22 Florida State	13	–	5	.722	24	–	9	.727
No. 12 North Carolina	13	–	5	.722	29	–	8	.784
Louisville	13	–	5	.722	22	–	11	.667
California	12	–	6	.667	25	–	9	.735
Virginia Tech	9	–	9	.500	19	–	13	.594
Georgia Tech	9	–	9	.500	22	–	11	.667
Virginia	8	–	10	.444	17	–	15	.531
Stanford	8	–	10	.444	16	–	15	.516
Boston College	6	–	12	.333	16	–	18	.471
Syracuse	6	–	12	.333	12	–	18	.400
Clemson	6	–	12	.333	14	–	17	.452
Pittsburgh	5	–	13	.278	13	–	19	.406
Miami (FL)	4	–	14	.222	14	–	15	.483
Wake Forest	2	–	16	.111	9	–	20	.310
SMU	2	–	16	.111	10	–	20	.333
† 2025 ACC tournament winner Rankings from AP Poll

The 2024–25 Clemson Tigers women's basketball team represented Clemson University during the 2024–25 college basketball season. The Tigers were led by first year head coach Shawn Poppie. The Tigers, members of the Atlantic Coast Conference, played their home games at Littlejohn Coliseum in Clemson, South Carolina.

Head coach Shawn Poppie was hired to replace outgoing head coach Amanda Butler on March 26, 2024.

The Tigers started the season with three straight wins, all by at least thirty points. That momentum was halted in their rivalry game with number one ranked South Carolina, where they lost 77–45. The Tigers then traveled to Florida to participate in the Emerald Coast Classic, where they won their opening game against UAB but fell in the championship game to twenty-third ranked Alabama 73–39. They won two of their next three non-conference games, with their loss coming to Florida in the ACC–SEC Challenge. They defeated Wake Forest by six points before traveling to San Diego for another tournament. There they finished 1–1, defeating Hawaii and suffering their fourth loss of the season to a SEC opponent in Georgia. They lost to twenty-second ranked NC State by only four points to finish 2024. They started 2025 with back-to-back ACC victories, including an upset of twentieth-ranked California. They could not carry that momentum as the Tigers lost their next four straight games. The run included a nine point loss to third ranked Notre Dame and a loss to seventeenth ranked Georgia Tech. The Tigers went 4–3 in their next seven games, defeating Miami, Syracuse, SMU, and getting revenge on now nineteenth ranked Georgia Tech. They lost to Boston College, tenth-ranked Duke, and thirteenth-ranked North Carolina, by just two points. They ended the season with three straight losses, against Pittsburgh, twenty-fifth ranked Louisville, and Virginia Tech. They Virginia Tech loss was by just two points, and the Tigers lead Louisville at halftime.

The Tigers finished the season 14–17 overall and 6–12 in ACC play to finish in a tie for twelfth place. As the fourteenth seed in the ACC tournament, they defeated Stanford in the First Round before losing to sixth seed Louisville in overtime in the Second Round. They were not invited to the NCAA tournament or the WBIT.

== Previous season ==
The Tigers finished the season 13–18 overall and 5–13 in ACC play to finish in a tie for twelfth place. As the twelfth seed in the ACC tournament, they lost to thirteenth seed Boston College the First Round. They were not invited to the NCAA tournament or the WBIT. After the season Clemson parted ways with head coach Amanda Butler.

== Offseason ==
=== Departures ===
Departures
Name	Number	Pos.	Height	Year	Hometown	Reason for departure
Dayshanette Harris	1	G	5'7"	Graduate Student	Mobile, Alabama	Graduated; signed professional contract with LDLC Asvel
Nya Valentine	2	G	5'3"	Junior	Mobile, Alabama	Transferred to Louisiana–Monroe
Makayla Elmore	3	F	6'3"	Junior	Fostoria, Ohio	Transferred to Pittsburgh
Amari Robinson	5	F	6'0"	Graduate Student	Douglasville, Georgia	Graduated; signed professional contract with Lupe Basket
Ruby Whitehorn	22	G	5'11"	Sophomore	Detroit, Michigan	Transferred to Tennessee
Danielle Rauch	33	G	5'8"	Graduate Student	Syracuse, NY	Graduated; hired as assistant coach at Western Carolina
Amani Freeman	34	F	6'2"	Graduate Student	Avon, Indiana	Graduated

=== Incoming transfers ===
Incoming transfers
Name	Number	Pos.	Height	Year	Hometown	Previous school
Loyal McQueen	1	G	5'8"	Graduate Student	Florence, South Carolina	Alabama
Kinsley Barrington	2	F	6'3"	Graduate Student	Spokane, Washington	California Baptist
Jordy Griggs	3	G/F	6'2"	Sophomore	Moreno Valley, California	Kentucky
Hannah Kohn	5	G	5'9"	Sophomore	Oviedo, Florida	Chattanooga
Summah Evans	7	F	6'0"	Graduate Student	Cairns, Australia	North Florida
Mia Moore	12	G	5'6"	Junior	Alpharetta, Georgia	UAB
Addie Porter	14	G	5'4"	Senior	Lebanon, Tennessee	Chattanooga
Tessa Miller	22	G	6'2"	Senior	Crossville, Tennessee	Belmont
Anya Poole	31	F	6'2"	Graduate Student	Raleigh, North Carolina	North Carolina
Raven Thompson	32	F	5'10"	Junior	Atlanta, Georgia	Chattanooga

=== 2024 recruiting class ===
College recruiting information
Name	Hometown	School	Height	Weight	Commit date
Morgan Miller; F	Andover, Minnesota	Andover High School	6 ft 2 in (1.88 m)	N/A	Nov 8, 2023
Morgan Miller; F	Recruit ratings: No ratings found				
Overall recruit ranking:
Note: In many cases, Scout, Rivals, 247Sports, On3, and ESPN may conflict in their listings of height and weight.; In these cases, the average was taken. ESPN grades are on a 100-point scale.; Sources:

== Roster ==
2024–25 Clemson Tigers women's basketball team
Players
Coaches

Pos.	#	Name	Height	Year	Previous school	Hometown
G	1	Loyal McQueen	5 ft 8 in (1.73 m)	GS	Wilson; Alabama	Florence, SC
G/F	3	Jordy Griggs	6 ft 2 in (1.88 m)	So	Montverde Academy; Kentucky	Moreno Valley, CA
G	5	Hannah Kohn	5 ft 9 in (1.75 m)	So	Hagerty; Chattanooga	Oviedo FL
F	7	Summah Evans	6 ft 0 in (1.83 m)	GS	Cairns; North Florida	Cairns, Australia
G	10	Kylee Kellermann	5 ft 6 in (1.68 m)	So	Philip Simmons	Charleston, SC
G	11	Maddi Cluse	5 ft 10 in (1.78 m)	Jr	Nordonia; Miami (OH)	Sagamore Hills, OH
G	12	Mia Moore	5 ft 6 in (1.68 m)	Jr	St. Francis; UAB	Alpharetta, GA
G	13	Bella Ranallo	5 ft 6 in (1.68 m)	So	Lake Forest	Lake Forest, IL
G	14	Addie Porter	5 ft 4 in (1.63 m)	Sr	Lebanon; Chattanooga	Lebanon, TN
F	20	Morgan Miller	6 ft 2 in (1.88 m)	Fr	Andover	Andover, MN
F	22	Tessa Miller	6 ft 2 in (1.88 m)	Sr	Stone Memorial; Belmont	Crossville, TN
G	30	Madi Ott	5 ft 10 in (1.78 m)	Sr	Frisco Centennial	Frisco, TX
F	31	Anya Poole	6 ft 2 in (1.88 m)	GS	Southeast Raleigh; North Carolina	Raleigh, NC
F	32	Raven Thompson	5 ft 10 in (1.78 m)	Jr	Langston Hughes; Chattanooga	Atlanta, GA

Head coach

- Shawn Poppie (Limestone)

Assistant coach(es)

- Chris Ayers (Florida A&M)
- Sydni Means (Mercer)
- Katelyn Grisillo (USC Aiken)
- Jon Goldberg (Emerson)
- Jayda Worthy (Radford)

Legend

- (C) Team captain
- (S) Suspended
- (I) Ineligible
- (W) Walk-on
- Injured
- Current redshirt

Roster
Last update: March 26, 2025

== Schedule ==
Date time, TV	Rank^{#}	Opponent^{#}	Result	Record	High points	High rebounds	High assists	Site (attendance) city, state
Regular Season
November 4, 2024*; 2:30 p.m., ACCNX/ESPN+		Jackson State	W 78–44	1–0	17 – T. Miller	11 – Moore	7 – McQueen	Littlejohn Coliseum (783); Clemson, SC
November 7, 2024*; 7:00 p.m., ACCNX/ESPN+		North Carolina Central	W 91–33	2–0	22 – McQueen	8 – T. Miller	5 – McQueen	Littlejohn Coliseum (814); Clemson, SC
November 11, 2024*; 11:00 a.m., ACCNX/ESPN+		Presbyterian	W 81–33	3–0	20 – McQueen	8 – Moore	6 – McQueen	Littlejohn Coliseum (6,589); Clemson, SC
November 20, 2024*; 5:00 p.m., ESPN2		No. 1 South Carolina; Rivalry	L 45–77	3–1	15 – McQueen	6 – Moore	2 – Tied	Littlejohn Coliseum (5,008); Clemson, SC
November 25, 2024*; 11:00 a.m., FloHoops		vs. UAB; Emerald Coast Classic Bay Bracket semifinals	W 90–52	4–1	15 – T. Miller	8 – Tied	7 – McQueen	The Arena (250); Niceville, FL
November 26, 2024*; 2:30 p.m., FloHoops		vs. No. 23 Alabama; Emerald Coast Classic Bay Bracket championship game	L 39–73	4–2	11 – Moore	9 – T. Miller	2 – Tied	The Arena (400); Niceville, FL
December 1, 2024*; 2:00 p.m., ACCNX/ESPN+		Kennesaw State	W 67–48	5–2	15 – T. Miller	11 – T. Miller	6 – McQueen	Littlejohn Coliseum (1,005); Clemson, SC
December 5, 2024*; 8:00 p.m., ACCN		Florida; ACC–SEC Challenge	L 64–77	5–3	18 – McQueen	7 – Kohn	5 – McQueen	Littlejohn Coliseum (1,475); Clemson, SC
December 8, 2024*; 2:00 p.m., ACCNX/ESPN+		Radford	W 74–48	6–3	16 – T. Miller	10 – T. Miller	10 – McQueen	Littlejohn Coliseum (1,239); Clemson, SC
December 15, 2024; 4:00 p.m., ACCN		at Wake Forest	W 65–59	7–3 (1–0)	17 – McQueen	15 – T. Miller	10 – McQueen	LJVM Coliseum (884); Winston-Salem, NC
December 19, 2024*; 4:30 p.m., BallerTV		vs. Georgia; San Diego Tournament	L 68–75	7–4	19 – McQueen	7 – T. Miller	3 – T. Miller	Viejas Arena; San Diego, CA
December 20, 2024*; 6:30 p.m., BallerTV		vs. Hawaii; San Diego Tournament	W 72–58	8–4	16 – Evans	4 – Tied	5 – Porter	Viejas Arena; San Diego, CA
December 29, 2024; 6:00 p.m., ACCN		at No. 22 NC State	L 79–83	8–5 (1–1)	23 – Moore	6 – Tied	9 – McQueen	Reynolds Coliseum (5,500); Raleigh, NC
January 2, 2025; 7:00 p.m., ACCNX/ESPN+		No. 20 California	W 69–58	9–5 (2–1)	18 – McQueen	8 – Poole	2 – Tied	Littlejohn Coliseum (1,143); Clemson, SC
January 5, 2025; 2:00 p.m., The CW		Stanford	W 65–61 ^{OT}	10–5 (3–1)	26 – McQueen	8 – T. Miller	6 – McQueen	Littlejohn Coliseum (2,418); Clemson, SC
January 9, 2025; 7:00 p.m., ACCNX/ESPN+		Virginia	L 60–67	10–6 (3–2)	20 – Moore	6 – Thompson	5 – T. Miller	Littlejohn Coliseum (1,821); Clemson, SC
January 12, 2025; 12:00 p.m., The CW		No. 3 Notre Dame	L 58–67	10–7 (3–3)	14 – Tied	6 – Tied	3 – Moore	Littlejohn Coliseum (3,816); Clemson, SC
January 16, 2025; 6:00 p.m., ACCNX/ESPN+		at Florida State	L 67–82	10–8 (3–4)	15 – McQueen	13 – T. Miller	4 – McQueen	Donald L. Tucker Center (1,336); Tallahassee, FL
January 19, 2025; 2:00 p.m., ACCNX/ESPN+		at No. 17 Georgia Tech	L 65–89	10–9 (3–5)	18 – McQueen	7 – Moore	6 – McQueen	McCamish Pavilion (6,386); Atlanta, GA
January 23, 2025; 7:00 p.m., ACCNX/ESPN+		Miami (FL)	W 64–61	11–9 (4–5)	17 – Thompson	11 – Thompson	4 – Tied	Littlejohn Coliseum (2,183); Clemson, SC
January 26, 2025; 2:00 p.m., ACCNX/ESPN+		Syracuse	W 67–55	11–10 (4–6)	15 – McQueen	10 – Moore	3 – McQueen	Littlejohn Coliseum (2,540); Clemson, SC
February 2, 2025; 2:00 p.m., ACCNX/ESPN+		at Boston College	L 65–94	11–11 (4–7)	19 – T. Miller	5 – Tied	4 – McQueen	Conte Forum (1,910); Chestnut Hill, MA
February 6, 2025; 7:00 p.m., ACCNX/ESPN+		at No. 10 Duke	L 55–74	11–12 (4–8)	19 – Cluse	9 – Moore	7 – McQueen	Cameron Indoor Stadium (2,471); Durham, NC
February 9, 2025; 2:00 p.m., ACCNX/ESPN+		No. 13 North Carolina	L 51–53	11–13 (4–9)	17 – McQueen	5 – Cluse	3 – Cluse	Littlejohn Coliseum (2,090); Clemson, SC
February 13, 2025; 7:00 p.m., ACCNX/ESPN+		No. 19 Georgia Tech	W 68–61	12–13 (5–9)	18 – T. Miller	8 – T. Miller	6 – McQueen	Littlejohn Coliseum (1,452); Clemson, SC
February 16, 2025; 4:00 p.m., ACCN		at SMU	W 72–46	13–13 (6–9)	21 – McQueen	10 – T. Miller	8 – McQueen	Moody Coliseum (1,751); University Park, TX
February 23, 2025; 1:00 p.m., ACCNX/ESPN+		at Pittsburgh	L 59–72	13–14 (6–10)	17 – McQueen	7 – Cluse	4 – McQueen	Peterson Events Center (700); Pittsburgh, PA
February 27, 2025; 6:00 p.m., ACCN		at No. 25 Louisville	L 52–78	13–15 (6–11)	16 – McQueen	5 – Tied	4 – McQueen	KFC Yum! Center (7,881); Louisville, KY
March 2, 2025; 2:00 p.m., ACCN		Virginia Tech	L 76–78	13–16 (6–12)	24 – Moore	9 – Moore	6 – T. Miller	Littlejohn Coliseum (2,032); Clemson, SC
ACC Women's Tournament
March 5, 2025*; 6:30 p.m., ACCN	(14)	vs. (11) Stanford; First Round	W 63–46	14–16	17 – McQueen	8 – Tied	6 – McQueen	Greensboro Coliseum (6,932); Greensboro, NC
March 6, 2025*; 7:30 p.m., ACCN	(14)	vs. (6) Louisville; Second Round	L 68–70 ^{OT}	14–17	14 – Kohn	6 – Moore	6 – McQueen	Greensboro Coliseum (5,828); Greensboro, NC
*Non-conference game. ^{#}Rankings from AP Poll. (#) Tournament seedings in parentheses. All times are in Eastern.

== Statistics ==
Player	GP	GS	MPG	FG%	3P%	FT%	RPG	APG	PPG
Maddi Cluse	29	17	18.3	47.2%	38.9%	38.5%	3.2	1.0	5.2
Summah Evans	28	10	17.3	39.1%	29.7%	70.6%	2.3	0.6	5.6
Kylee Kellermann	8	0	2.1	16.7%	20.0%	—	0.4	0.4	0.4
Hannah Kohn	30	12	26.8	34.6%	34.4%	87.1%	2.0	0.7	9.0
Loyal McQueen	30	30	32.1	43.1%	38.9%	85.1%	3.0	4.9	13.6
Morgan Miller	9	0	1.7	25.0%	—	80.0%	0.7	—	0.7
Tessa Miller	30	24	23.4	53.3%	35.7%	63.2%	6.0	1.6	8.2
Mia Moore	29	24	26.4	41.0%	42.7%	70.0%	5.5	1.9	10.8
Madi Ott	21	1	6.6	29.0%	25.9%	100%	0.2	0.5	1.3
Anya Poole	29	8	15.5	57.5%	0.0%	70.8%	3.7	1.1	5.3
Addie Porter	30	16	19.7	35.0%	30.4%	73.3%	2.0	1.6	2.2
Raven Thompson	30	8	18.8	43.9%	31.3%	70.0%	3.4	1.2	5.8
