= 2024–25 USC Upstate Spartans women's basketball team =

American college basketball season

2024–25 USC Upstate Spartans women's basketball
- Conference: Big South Conference
- Record: 9–21 (6–10 Big South)
- Head coach: Jason Williams (3rd season)
- Associate head coach: Steven Rhodes
- Assistant coach: Jennifer DeGraaf
- Home arena: G. B. Hodge Center

2024–25 Big South women's basketball standings
	Conf.				Overall
Team	W		L	PCT	W		L	PCT
High Point †	13	–	3	.813	21	–	12	.636
Longwood	11	–	5	.688	22	–	12	.647
Radford	10	–	6	.625	14	–	17	.452
Charleston Southern	10	–	6	.625	14	–	16	.467
Winthrop	9	–	7	.563	16	–	15	.516
Gardner–Webb	8	–	8	.500	11	–	18	.379
USC Upstate	6	–	10	.375	9	–	21	.300
Presbyterian	4	–	12	.250	6	–	24	.200
UNC Asheville	1	–	15	.063	4	–	27	.129
† 2025 Big South tournament winner

The 2024–25 USC Upstate Spartans women's basketball team represented the University of South Carolina Upstate during the 2024–25 NCAA Division I women's basketball season. The Spartans, led by third-year head coach Jason Williams, played their home games at the G. B. Hodge Center in Spartanburg, South Carolina as members of the Big South Conference.

== Previous season ==
The Spartans finished the 2023–24 season 16–16, 10–6 in Big South play, to finish in second place. They would defeat Longwood, before falling to Radford in the semifinals of the Big South tournament. They received an automatic bid into the WNIT, where they would fall to Charleston in the first round.

== Roster ==
2024–25 USC Upstate Spartans women's basketball team
Players
Coaches

Pos.	#	Name	Height	Year	Previous school	Hometown
G	0	Zora Fray-Chinn	5 ft 11 in (1.8 m)	RS Jr	Wright State	Orlando, Florida
G	1	Jeni Levine	5 ft 6 in (1.68 m)	Jr	Staunton River High School	Vinton, Virginia
G	2	Macy Wike	5 ft 9 in (1.75 m)	So	Asheville Christian Academy	Cullowhee, North Carolina
G	3	Gwen Jenkins	5 ft 9 in (1.75 m)	Fr	Dublin Coffman High School	Columbus, Ohio
G	6	Olivia Forster	5 ft 6 in (1.68 m)	Fr	Copleston High School	Oldham, England
G	12	Cali Levine	5 ft 6 in (1.68 m)	RS So	Staunton River High School	Vinton, Virginia
G	13	Lele Tanuvasa	6 ft 0 in (1.83 m)	RS Fr	Colorado	Eureka, California
F	15	Ava Miller	6 ft 2 in (1.88 m)	Fr	Mayo High School	Rochester, Minnesota
F	21	Rebekah Gordon	6 ft 1 in (1.85 m)	Sr	Central Michigan	New Boston, Indiana
G	22	Gracie Barnes	5 ft 9 in (1.75 m)	So	Cincinnati Country Day School	Cincinnati, Ohio
G	25	Cassie Gallagher	5 ft 11 in (1.8 m)	RS Fr	Cookeville High School	Cookeville, Tennessee
F	32	Madison Miller	6 ft 4 in (1.93 m)	Fr	Morris Catholic High School	Hamburg, New Jersey
F	33	AC Markham	5 ft 10 in (1.78 m)	Sr	Providence Christian Academy	Murfreesboro, Tennessee
F	34	Vera Soderblom	6 ft 0 in (1.83 m)	RS So	Luleå Gymnasieskola	Gothenburg, Sweden
G	35	Aubrie Kierscht	5 ft 6 in (1.68 m)	RS So	Presbyterian	Salina, Kansas
F	42	Emma Blair	6 ft 2 in (1.88 m)	RS Fr	Greater Latrobe High School	Latrobe, Pennsylvania

Head coach

- Jason Williams (Greensboro)

Assistant coach(es)

- Steven Rhodes (UNC Wilmington)
- Jennifer DeGraaf (UNC Wilmington)

Legend

- (C) Team captain
- (S) Suspended
- (I) Ineligible
- (W) Walk-on
- Injured
- Current redshirt

Roster
Last update: January 19, 2025

== Schedule and results ==
Date time, TV	Rank^{#}	Opponent^{#}	Result	Record	Site (attendance) city, state
Non-conference regular season
November 4, 2024*; 5:00 pm, SECN+		at No. 22 Kentucky	L 43–98	0–1	Memorial Coliseum (4,007); Lexington, KY
November 9, 2024*; 12:00 pm, ESPN+		at UNC Greensboro	L 54–62	0–2	Fleming Gymnasium (342); Greensboro, NC
November 13, 2024*; 6:30 pm		at South Carolina State	W 60–52	1–2	SHM Memorial Center (353); Orangeburg, SC
November 16, 2024*; 2:00 pm, ESPN+		Western Carolina	L 52–80	1–3	G. B. Hodge Center (237); Spartanburg, SC
November 19, 2024*; 7:00 pm, ESPN+		at Furman	L 53–81	1–4	Hayes Gymnasium (263); Tigerville, SC
November 22, 2024*; 7:00 pm, ESPN+		Queens	L 58–65	1–5	G. B. Hodge Center (178); Spartanburg, SC
November 25, 2024*; 7:00 pm, ESPN+		Clinton	W 71–50	2–5	G. B. Hodge Center (170); Spartanburg, SC
November 29, 2024*; 3:00 pm, ESPN+		Morehead State; Spartan Shootout	L 54–66	2–6	G. B. Hodge Center (152); Spartanburg, SC
November 30, 2024*; 3:00 pm, ESPN+		Bellarmine; Spartan Shootout	L 64–72	2–7	G. B. Hodge Center (149); Spartanburg, SC
December 3, 2024*; 7:30 pm, ESPN+		at No. 20 Iowa State	L 35–92	2–8	Hilton Coliseum (9,949); Ames, IA
December 5, 2024*; 7:30 pm, ESPN+		at No. 13 Kansas State	L 24–110	2–9	Bramlage Coliseum (3,386); Manhattan, KS
December 16, 2024*; 12:00 pm, ESPN+		at Drake	L 34–84	2–10	Knapp Center (6,424); Des Moines, IA
December 19, 2024*; 11:00 am, ESPN+		Lees–McRae	W 65–59	3–10	G. B. Hodge Center (818); Spartanburg, SC
Big South regular season
January 2, 2025; 7:00 pm, ESPN+		Winthrop	L 54–63	3–11 (0–1)	G. B. Hodge Center (112); Spartanburg, SC
January 8, 2025; 6:30 pm, ESPN+		at Presbyterian	L 58–59	3–12 (0–2)	Templeton Center (642); Clinton, SC
January 11, 2025; 2:00 pm, ESPN+		at Radford	L 56–64	3–13 (0–3)	Dedmon Center (638); Radford, VA
January 15, 2025; 6:00 pm, ESPN+		UNC Asheville	W 60–57	4–13 (1–3)	G. B. Hodge Center (240); Spartanburg, SC
January 18, 2025; 1:00 pm, ESPN+		at Gardner–Webb	L 73–79	4–14 (1–4)	Paul Porter Arena (378); Boiling Springs, NC
January 22, 2025; 7:00 pm, ESPN+		at High Point	L 31-84	4-15 (1-5)	Qubein Center (736); High Point, NC
January 25, 2025; 4:00 pm, ESPN+		Longwood	W 46-45	5-15 (2-5)	G. B. Hodge Center (228); Spartanburg, SC
January 29, 2025; 6:00 pm, ESPN+		at Charleston Southern	L 58-62	5-16 (2-6)	Buccaneer Field House (485); North Charleston, SC
February 1, 2025; 4:00 pm, ESPN+		Radford	L 59-65 ^{OT}	5-17 (2-7)	G. B. Hodge Center (234); Spartanburg, SC
February 5, 2025; 7:00 pm, ESPN+		Presbyterian	L 51-68	5-18 (2-8)	G. B. Hodge Center (302); Spartanburg, SC
February 8, 2025; 2:00 pm, ESPN+		at Winthrop	W 52-48	6-18 (3-8)	Winthrop Coliseum (340); Rock Hill, SC
February 12, 2025; 6:30 pm, ESPN+		at UNC Asheville	W 60-51	7-18 (4-8)	Kimmel Arena (231); Asheville, NC
February 15, 2025; 2:00 pm, ESPN+		Gardner–Webb	W 68-59	8-18 (5-8)	G. B. Hodge Center (233); Spartanburg, SC
February 22, 2025; 4:00 pm, ESPN+		Charleston Southern	L 49-59	8-19 (5-9)	G. B. Hodge Center (227); Spartanburg, SC
February 26, 2025; 7:00 pm, ESPN+		High Point	L 47-72	8-20 (5-10)	G. B. Hodge Center (279); Spartanburg, SC
March 1, 2025; 2:00 pm, ESPN+		at Longwood	W 62-60 ^{OT}	9-20 (6-10)	Joan Perry Brock Center (1,387); Farmville, VA
Big South tournament
March 6, 2025; 6:00 pm, ESPN+	(7)	vs. (2) Longwood; Quarterfinals	L 37–56	9–21	Freedom Hall Civic Center (1); Johnson City, TN
*Non-conference game. ^{#}Rankings from AP Poll. (#) Tournament seedings in parentheses. All times are in Eastern.
