= 2025 Big South Conference women's basketball tournament =

American collegiate sporting event

- Classification: Division I
- Season: 2024–25
- Teams: 9
- Site: Freedom Hall Civic Center; Johnson City, Tennessee
- Champions: High Point (2nd title)
- Winning coach: Chelsea Banbury (2nd title)
- MVP: Jaleesa Lawrence (High Point)
- Television: ESPN+, ESPN2

2024–25 Big South women's basketball standings
	Conf.				Overall
Team	W		L	PCT	W		L	PCT
High Point †	13	–	3	.813	21	–	12	.636
Longwood	11	–	5	.688	22	–	12	.647
Radford	10	–	6	.625	14	–	17	.452
Charleston Southern	10	–	6	.625	14	–	16	.467
Winthrop	9	–	7	.563	16	–	15	.516
Gardner–Webb	8	–	8	.500	11	–	18	.379
USC Upstate	6	–	10	.375	9	–	21	.300
Presbyterian	4	–	12	.250	6	–	24	.200
UNC Asheville	1	–	15	.063	4	–	27	.129
† 2025 Big South tournament winner

The 2025 Big South women's basketball tournament was a postseason women's basketball tournament that ended the 2024–25 season of the Big South Conference. It was held from March 5–9, 2025 and was played at the Freedom Hall Civic Center in Johnson City, Tennessee. The tournament winner High Point, received the automatic bid to the 2025 NCAA tournament.

== Seeds ==
All of the conference teams competed in the tournament. The top seven teams received a first-round bye. Teams were seeded by record within the conference, with a tiebreaker system to seed teams with identical conference records.

The tiebreakers operate in the following order:

1. Head-to-head record.
2. Record against the top-ranked conference team not involved in the tie, going down the standings until the tie is broken. For this purpose, teams with the same conference record are considered collectively. If two teams were unbeaten or winless against an opponent but did not play the same number of games against that opponent, the tie is not considered broken.

Seed	School	Conference	Overall	Tiebreaker
1	High Point	13–3	18–11	
2	Longwood	11–5	20–10	
3	Radford	10–6	13–16	1–1 vs. Charleston Southern; 1–1 vs. High Point
4	Charleston Southern	10–6	14–15	1–1 vs. Radford; 0–2 vs. High Point
5	Winthrop	9–7	15–14	
6	Gardner–Webb	8–8	11–17	
7	USC Upstate	6–10	9–20	
8	Presbyterian	4–12	6–23	
9	UNC Asheville	1–15	3–26	

== Schedule ==
Game	Time*	Matchup	Score	Channel
Opening Round - Wednesday, March 5
1	6:00 pm	No. 8 Presbyterian vs No. 9 UNC Asheville	63–69	ESPN+
Quarterfinals - Thursday, March 6
2	11:30 am	No. 1 High Point vs No. 9 UNC Asheville	85–57	ESPN+
3	2:00 pm	No. 4 Charleston Southern vs No. 5 Winthrop	45–48	ESPN+
4	6:00 pm	No. 2 Longwood vs No. 7 USC Upstate	56–37	ESPN+
5	8:30 pm	No. 3 Radford vs No. 6 Gardner–Webb	69–63	ESPN+
Semifinals - Saturday, March 8
6	6:00 pm	No. 1 High Point vs No. 5 Winthrop	64–49	ESPN+
7	8:30 pm	No. 2 Longwood vs No. 3 Radford	73–65	ESPN+
Championship - Sunday, March 9
8	6:00 pm	No. 1 High Point vs No. 2 Longwood	59–53	ESPN2
*Game times in EST through the semifinals and EDT for the championship. * = Denotes overtime period

== Bracket ==
Opening Round; Wednesday, March 5 ESPN+
8	Presbyterian	63
9	UNC Asheville	69

Quarterfinals; Thursday, March 6 ESPN+
1	High Point	85
9	UNC Asheville	57
4	Charleston Southern	45
5	Winthrop	48
2	Longwood	56
7	USC Upstate	37
3	Radford	69
6	Gardner–Webb	63

Semifinals; Saturday, March 8 ESPN+
1	High Point	64
5	Winthrop	49
2	Longwood	73
3	Radford	65

Championship; Sunday, March 9 ESPN2
1	High Point	59
2	Longwood	53

* = Denotes overtime period.
