= 2024–25 Wake Forest Demon Deacons women's basketball team =

Intercollegiate basketball season

2024–25 Wake Forest Demon Deacons women's basketball
- Conference: Atlantic Coast Conference
- Record: 9–20 (2–16 ACC)
- Head coach: Megan Gebbia (3rd season)
- Assistant coaches: Nikki Flores (3rd season); Emily Stallings (3rd season); Millette Green (3rd season)
- Home arena: LJVM Coliseum

2024–25 ACC women's basketball standings
	Conf.				Overall
Team	W		L	PCT	W		L	PCT
No. 9 NC State	16	–	2	.889	28	–	7	.800
No. 8 Notre Dame	16	–	2	.889	28	–	6	.824
No. 7 Duke †	14	–	4	.778	29	–	8	.784
No. 22 Florida State	13	–	5	.722	24	–	9	.727
No. 12 North Carolina	13	–	5	.722	29	–	8	.784
Louisville	13	–	5	.722	22	–	11	.667
California	12	–	6	.667	25	–	9	.735
Virginia Tech	9	–	9	.500	19	–	13	.594
Georgia Tech	9	–	9	.500	22	–	11	.667
Virginia	8	–	10	.444	17	–	15	.531
Stanford	8	–	10	.444	16	–	15	.516
Boston College	6	–	12	.333	16	–	18	.471
Syracuse	6	–	12	.333	12	–	18	.400
Clemson	6	–	12	.333	14	–	17	.452
Pittsburgh	5	–	13	.278	13	–	19	.406
Miami (FL)	4	–	14	.222	14	–	15	.483
Wake Forest	2	–	16	.111	9	–	20	.310
SMU	2	–	16	.111	10	–	20	.333
† 2025 ACC tournament winner Rankings from AP Poll

The 2024–25 Wake Forest Demon Deacons women's basketball team represented Wake Forest University during the 2024–25 NCAA Division I women's basketball season. The Demon Deacons were led by third-year head coach Megan Gebbia, and competed as members of the Atlantic Coast Conference. They played their home games at the Lawrence Joel Veterans Memorial Coliseum in Winston-Salem, North Carolina.

The Demon Deacons began the season with two wins over Queens and Charlotte before a period where they traded wins and losses. The team went 4–4 over its next eight games with wins against Winthrop, Davidson, Gardner–Webb, and Campbell but losses against Villanova, George Mason, Fairfield, and St. John's. They hosted Clemson in their ACC opener, but lost 59–65. They finished 2024 with a win against UNC Greensboro 54–50. The Demon Deacons lost their first seven games of 2025. The stretch included three losses to ranked teams, number three Notre Dame, number eighteen California, and number thirteen North Carolina. They also lost to Louisville in overtime. The streak was broken by the Demon Deacons' first ACC win, which was a 69–59 win against Boston College. The team lost its next five games straight, including four games against ranked opponents. They defeated SMU 67–64 before losing their last three games of the season.

The Demon Deacons finished the season 9–20 overall and 2–16 in ACC play to finish in a tie for seventeenth place. Under the new ACC tournament rules, they did not qualify for the 2025 ACC tournament. They were not invited to the NCAA tournament or the WBIT.

== Previous season ==
The Demon Deacons finished the season 7–25 overall and 2–16 in ACC play to finish in a tie for fourteenth place. As the fourteenth seed in the ACC tournament, they defeated eleventh seed with Virginia in the First Round before losing to sixth seed Florida State in the second round. They were not invited to the NCAA tournament or the WBIT. Their seven overall wins was their lowest win total since the 1999–2000 season.

== Off-season ==
=== Departures ===
Departures
Name	Number	Pos.	Height	Year	Hometown	Reason for departure
Kaia Harrison	2	G	5'7"	Graduate student	Baldwin, New York	Graduated
Aliah McWhorter	4	G	6'1"	Senior	Cincinnati, Ohio	Transferred to Ohio
Kate Deeble	12	G	5'8"	(redshirt) Freshman	Brisbane, Australia	Left to play for Gold Coast Rollers
Alexandra Scruggs	32	G	5'10"	Graduate student	Fayetteville, North Carolina	Graduated

=== Incoming transfers ===
Incoming transfers
Name	Number	Pos.	Height	Year	Hometown	Previous school
Emily Johns	44	F	6'1"	Graduate student	Washington Township, New Jersey	American

=== Recruiting class ===
College recruiting
Name	Hometown	School	Height	Weight	Commit date
Kennedy Moore; F	Kalispell, Montana	Flathead	6 ft 2 in (1.88 m)	N/A	Apr 17, 2024
Kennedy Moore; F	Recruit ratings: ESPN: (NR)				
Aurora Sørbye; G	Bergen, Norway	Metis Sports Athlete	5 ft 9 in (1.75 m)	N/A	Nov 8, 2023
Aurora Sørbye; G	Recruit ratings: ESPN: (NR)				
Overall recruit ranking:
Note: In many cases, Scout, Rivals, 247Sports, On3, and ESPN may conflict in their listings of height and weight.; In these cases, the average was taken. ESPN grades are on a 100-point scale.; Sources:

== Roster ==
2024–25 Wake Forest Demon Deacons women's basketball team
Players
Coaches

Pos.	#	Name	Height	Year	Previous school	Hometown
G	0	Alyssa Andrews	6 ft 0 in (1.83 m)	Sr	Colgan	Woodbridge, VA
G	1	Makaela Quimby	5 ft 9 in (1.75 m)	So	McDonogh	Owings Mills, MD
G	2	Aurora Sørbye	5 ft 9 in (1.75 m)	Fr	Metis Sports Athlete	Bergen, Norway
G	5	Malaya Cowles	6 ft 3 in (1.91 m)	RS Jr	Winston-Salem Christian	Wilkesboro, NC
G	11	Raegyn Conley	6 ft 0 in (1.83 m)	Sr	Baylor School	Chattanooga, TN
G	14	Rylie Theuerkauf	5 ft 9 in (1.75 m)	So	Tenafly	Tenafly, NJ
F	15	Kennedy Moore	6 ft 2 in (1.88 m)	Fr	Flathead	Kalispell, MT
G	21	Elise Williams	5 ft 9 in (1.75 m)	Sr	Wakefield	Raleigh, NC
G	22	Madisyn Jordan	6 ft 1 in (1.85 m)	So	Panther Creek	Morrisville, NC
F	25	DeMeara Hinds	6 ft 2 in (1.88 m)	RS Sr	Lithia Springs	Douglasville, GA
F	44	Emily Johns	6 ft 1 in (1.85 m)	GS	Washington Township; American	Washington Township, NJ

Head coach

- Megan Gebbia (Towson)

Assistant coach(es)

- Nikki Flores (Marist)
- Millette Green (UMBC)
- Emily Stallings (East Stroudsburg)

Legend

- (C) Team captain
- (S) Suspended
- (I) Ineligible
- (W) Walk-on
- Injured
- Current redshirt

Roster
Last update: September 5, 2024

== Schedule ==
Date time, TV	Rank^{#}	Opponent^{#}	Result	Record	High points	High rebounds	High assists	Site (attendance) city, state
Regular season
November 4, 2024*; 5:00 p.m., ACCNX		Queens	W 102–40	1–0	15 – Cowles	10 – Andrews	5 – Williams	LJVM Coliseum (916); Winston-Salem, NC
November 7, 2024*; 6:30 p.m., ESPN+		at Charlotte	W 60–41	2–0	12 – Jones	9 – Cowles	5 – Jones	Halton Arena (804); Charlotte, NC
November 10, 2024*; 2:00 p.m., FloHoops		at Villanova	L 56–64	2–1	19 – Jones	9 – Jones	4 – Hinds	Finneran Pavilion (1,511); Villanova, PA
November 17, 2024*; 2:00 p.m., ACCNX		Winthrop	W 64–50	3–1	12 – Tied	5 – Tied	4 – Williams	LJVM Coliseum (897); Winston-Salem, NC
November 20, 2024*; 7:00 p.m., ACCNX		George Mason	L 41–50	3–2	11 – Theuerkauf	7 – Cowles	2 – Tied	LJVM Coliseum (744); Winston-Salem, NC
November 23, 2024*; 1:00 p.m., ACCNX		Davidson	W 60–55	4–2	14 – Hinds	8 – Andrews	6 – Williams	LJVM Coliseum (859); Winston-Salem, NC
November 27, 2024*; 12:00 p.m., ACCNX		Fairfield	L 65–72	4–3	15 – Tied	7 – Jones	5 – Williams	LJVM Coliseum (788); Winston-Salem, NC
December 1, 2024*; 2:00 p.m., ACCNX		Gardner–Webb	W 73–52	5–3	15 – Sørbye	8 – Cowles	4 – Williams	LJVM Coliseum (843); Winston-Salem, NC
December 4, 2024*; 11:30 a.m., ACCNX		Campbell	W 63–46	6–3	21 – Cowles	12 – Hinds	4 – Tied	LJVM Coliseum (4,836); Winston-Salem, NC
December 8, 2024*; 2:00 p.m., FloHoops		at St. John's	L 45–63	6–4	17 – Hinds	8 – Hinds	3 – Theuerkauf	Carnesecca Arena (705); New York City, NY
December 15, 2024; 4:00 p.m., ACCN		Clemson	L 59–65	6–5 (0–1)	12 – Sørbye	8 – Hinds	3 – Tied	LJVM Coliseum (884); Winston-Salem, NC
December 20, 2024*; 6:00 p.m., ACCNX		UNC Greensboro	W 54–50	7–5	11 – Jones	11 – Cowles	6 – Sørbye	LJVM Coliseum (878); Winston-Salem, NC
January 2, 2025; 7:00 p.m., ACCNX		at Virginia	L 46–69	7–6 (0–2)	17 – Conley	9 – Cowles	8 – Jones	John Paul Jones Arena (4,105); Charlottesville, VA
January 5, 2025; 4:00 p.m., ACCN		Louisville	L 76–81 ^{OT}	7–7 (0–3)	17 – Theuerkauf	6 – Cowles	7 – Jones	LJVM Coliseum (1,019); Winston-Salem, NC
January 9, 2025; 7:00 p.m., ACCNX		at No. 3 Notre Dame	L 64–100	7–8 (0–4)	18 – Williams	10 – Cowles	5 – Williams	Purcell Pavilion (6,753); Notre Dame, IN
January 12, 2025; 2:00 p.m., ACCNX		at Virginia Tech	L 54–61	7–9 (0–5)	15 – Williams	4 – Tied	3 – Williams	Cassell Coliseum (5,502); Blacksburg, VA
January 16, 2025; 6:00 p.m., ACCNX		Stanford	L 71–74	7–10 (0–6)	19 – Williams	5 – Williams	4 – Williams	LJVM Coliseum (926); Winston-Salem, NC
January 19, 2025; 2:00 p.m., ACCNX		No. 18 California	L 55–67	7–11 (0–7)	15 – Williams	4 – Tied	3 – Tied	LJVM Coliseum (1,123); Winston-Salem, NC
January 23, 2025; 7:00 p.m., ACCNX		at No. 13 North Carolina	L 51–76	7–12 (0–8)	19 – Theuerkauf	4 – Tied	5 – Tied	Carmichael Arena (2,463); Chapel Hill, NC
January 26, 2025; 2:00 p.m., ACCN		Boston College	W 69–59	8–12 (1–8)	21 – Theuerkauf	5 – Tied	5 – Williams	LJVM Coliseum (1,076); Winston-Salem, NC
January 30, 2025; 6:00 p.m., ACCNX		No. 17 NC State	L 83–90	8–13 (1–9)	25 – Theuerkauf	5 – Cowles	4 – Tied	LJVM Coliseum (1,785); Winston-Salem, NC
February 2, 2025; 6:00 p.m., ACCNX		at No. 25 Florida State	L 68–97	8–14 (1–10)	18 – Hinds	13 – Hinds	5 – Sørbye	Donald L. Tucker Center (2,139); Tallahassee, FL
February 9, 2025; 2:00 p.m., ACCNX		at Syracuse	L 50–62	8–15 (1–11)	14 – Hinds	7 – Cowles	6 – Sørbye	JMA Wireless Dome (3,735); Syracuse, NY
February 13, 2025; 6:00 p.m., ACCNX		No. 13 Duke	L 47–72	8–16 (1–12)	11 – Theuerkauf	8 – Williams	2 – Sørbye	LJVM Coliseum (1,343); Winston-Salem, NC
February 16, 2025; 12:00 p.m., ACCN		at No. 19 Georgia Tech	L 62–73	8–17 (1–13)	20 – Theuerkauf	8 – Conley	7 – Jones	McCamish Pavilion (2,568); Atlanta, GA
February 20, 2025; 6:00 p.m., ACCNX		SMU	W 67–64	9–17 (2–13)	20 – Williams	6 – Tied	4 – Williams	LJVM Coliseum (856); Winston-Salem, NC
February 23, 2025; 12:00 p.m., ACCN		at Miami (FL)	L 60–62	9–18 (2–14)	18 – Theuerkauf	7 – Hinds	4 – Sørbye	Watsco Center (2,788); Coral Gables, FL
February 27, 2025; 7:00 p.m., ACCNX		at No. 9 NC State	L 57–78	9–19 (2–15)	14 – Cowles	12 – Conley	6 – Williams	Reynolds Coliseum (5,500); Raleigh, NC
March 2, 2025; 2:00 p.m., ACCNX		Pittsburgh	L 63–79	9–20 (2–16)	23 – Theuerkauf	10 – Hinds	6 – Williams	LJVM Coliseum (1,393); Winston-Salem, NC
*Non-conference game. ^{#}Rankings from AP Poll. (#) Tournament seedings in parentheses. All times are in Eastern.
