= 2024–25 Virginia Tech Hokies women's basketball team =

Intercollegiate basketball season

2024–25 Virginia Tech Hokies women's basketball

WBIT, Second Round
- Conference: Atlantic Coast Conference
- Record: 19–13 (9–9 ACC)
- Head coach: Megan Duffy (1st season)
- Associate head coach: Itoro Coleman (1st season)
- Assistant coaches: Sharnee Zoll-Norman (1st season); Jen Hoover (1st season)
- Home arena: Cassell Coliseum

2024–25 ACC women's basketball standings
	Conf.				Overall
Team	W		L	PCT	W		L	PCT
No. 9 NC State	16	–	2	.889	28	–	7	.800
No. 8 Notre Dame	16	–	2	.889	28	–	6	.824
No. 7 Duke †	14	–	4	.778	29	–	8	.784
No. 22 Florida State	13	–	5	.722	24	–	9	.727
No. 12 North Carolina	13	–	5	.722	29	–	8	.784
Louisville	13	–	5	.722	22	–	11	.667
California	12	–	6	.667	25	–	9	.735
Virginia Tech	9	–	9	.500	19	–	13	.594
Georgia Tech	9	–	9	.500	22	–	11	.667
Virginia	8	–	10	.444	17	–	15	.531
Stanford	8	–	10	.444	16	–	15	.516
Boston College	6	–	12	.333	16	–	18	.471
Syracuse	6	–	12	.333	12	–	18	.400
Clemson	6	–	12	.333	14	–	17	.452
Pittsburgh	5	–	13	.278	13	–	19	.406
Miami (FL)	4	–	14	.222	14	–	15	.483
Wake Forest	2	–	16	.111	9	–	20	.310
SMU	2	–	16	.111	10	–	20	.333
† 2025 ACC tournament winner Rankings from AP Poll

The 2024–25 Virginia Tech Hokies women's basketball team represented Virginia Polytechnic Institute and State University during the 2024–25 NCAA Division I women's basketball season. The Hokies were led by first-year head coach Megan Duffy and played their home games at Cassell Coliseum in Blacksburg, Virginia as members of the Atlantic Coast Conference. Duffy entered her first season after being hired to replace Kenny Brooks on April 3, 2024.

The Hokies won five out of their first six games before the Thanksgiving tournament. Their only loss was a neutral-site game against Iowa 71–52. The only other Power-4 conference team they played during this stretch was Rutgers, whom they defeated 91–80. The Hokies then traveled to Florida where they participated in the Fort Myers Tip-Off. They went 1–1 in the event, defeating Davidson and losing to Michigan. They then won their ACC–SEC Challenge game over Georgia, 70–61 in Athens. The Hokies lost to Duke in their ACC opener, as well as their first game against a ranked opponent. Duke was ranked eighth at the time of their meeting. Virginia Tech rounded out their non-conference schedule with two wins before a New Year's break. Upon return in January, they lost to Florida State, before winning their next three ACC games. The highlight of the three game winning streak, was handing thirteenth ranked Georgia Tech their first loss of the season in double-overtime. Their winning streak ended with a rivalry loss to Virginia. The Hokies struggled to string together wins after that, going 3–3 over their next six games. They only faced two ranked teams in this stretch, losing to both number twenty NC State and number three Notre Dame. They went 3–3 in their last six ACC games, defeating Virginia, California, and Clemson on the final day of the season. They lost to twelfth-ranked North Carolina, and suffered overtime losses to both Stanford and Boston College.

The Hokies finished the season 19–13 overall and 9–9 in ACC play to finish in a tie for tenth place. As the eighth seed in the ACC tournament, they lost to ninth-seed Georgia Tech in the Second Round. They received an at-large bid to the WBIT and were the first seed in their section of the bracket. They defeated un-seeded North Carolina A&T before losing to also un-seeded Texas Tech 69–59 to end their season.

== Previous season ==
The Hokies finished the season 25–8 overall and 14–4 in ACC play to finish as regular season champions. As the first seed in the ACC tournament, they earned a bye into the Quarterfinals where they defeated ninth seed Miami before losing to eventual champions Notre Dame. They received an at-large invitation to the NCAA Tournament, marking the fourth straight time the Hokies qualified for the tournament. As the fourth seed in the Portland 3 they defeated thirteenth seed Marshall in the First Round before losing to fifth seed Baylor in the Second Round to end their season. After the loss, head coach Kenny Brooks announced that he was stepping down from the team in order to accept the head coaching position at Kentucky.

== Off-season ==
=== Departures ===
Departures
Name	Number	Pos.	Height	Year	Hometown	Reason for departure
Gabby Brooks	2	G	5'10"	Freshman	Harrisonburg, Virginia	Transferred to Kentucky
Georgia Amoore	5	G	5'6"	Senior	Ballarat, Australia	Transferred to Kentucky
Clara Strack	13	C	6'5"	Freshman	Buffalo, New York	Transferred to Kentucky
Olivia Summiel	20	G/F	6'2"	Graduate Student	Dayville, Connecticut	Graduated
Cayla King	22	G	6'0"	Graduate Student	Greensboro, North Carolina	Graduated
Elizabeth Kitley	33	C	6'6"	Graduate Student	Summerfield, North Carolina	Graduated; drafted 24th overall in the 2024 WNBA draft

=== Incoming transfers ===
Incoming transfers
Name	Number	Pos.	Height	Year	Hometown	Previous school
Lani White	0	G	5'11"	Junior	Irvine, California	Utah

=== Recruiting class ===
College recruiting
Name	Hometown	School	Height	Weight	Commit date
Myah Hazelton; F	Baltimore, Maryland	Sparrows Point	6 ft 4 in (1.93 m)	N/A	Sep 5, 2022
Myah Hazelton; F	Recruit ratings: ESPN: (NR)				
Kayl Petersen; G/F	Waupun, Wisconsin	Waupun	6 ft 0 in (1.83 m)	N/A	Apr 29, 2024
Kayl Petersen; G/F	Recruit ratings: ESPN: (93)				
Leila Wells; G	Chelsea, Michigan	Chelsea	5 ft 9 in (1.75 m)	N/A	Apr 21, 2024
Leila Wells; G	Recruit ratings: ESPN: (NR)				
Ramiya White; C	Louisville, Kentucky	Butler Traditional	6 ft 5 in (1.96 m)	N/A	May 1, 2024
Ramiya White; C	Recruit ratings: ESPN: (NR)				
Overall recruit ranking:
Note: In many cases, Scout, Rivals, 247Sports, On3, and ESPN may conflict in their listings of height and weight.; In these cases, the average was taken. ESPN grades are on a 100-point scale.; Sources:

== Roster ==
2024–25 Virginia Tech Hokies women's basketball team
Players
Coaches

Pos.	#	Name	Height	Year	Previous school	Hometown
G	0	Lani White	5 ft 11 in (1.8 m)	Jr	Mater Dei; Utah	Irvine, CA
G	1	Carleigh Wenzel	6 ft 0 in (1.83 m)	RS So	Antonian College Prep	San Antonio, TX
G	2	Leila Wells	5 ft 9 in (1.75 m)	Fr	Chelsea	Chelsea, MI
G	3	Mackenzie Nelson	5 ft 8 in (1.73 m)	RS Fr	St. Luke's	Greenwich, CT
F	4	Rose Micheaux	6 ft 3 in (1.91 m)	Sr	Wayne Memorial; Minnesota	Wayne, MI
F	10	Carys Baker	6 ft 2 in (1.88 m)	So	Loomis Chaffee	West Hartford, CT
G/F	11	Matilda Ekh	6 ft 0 in (1.83 m)	Sr	Riksbasketgymnasiet Luleå; Michigan State	Västerås, Sweden
G	12	Samyah Suffren	5 ft 8 in (1.73 m)	So	Cannon School	Charlotte, NC
F	21	Myah Hazelton	6 ft 4 in (1.93 m)	Fr	Sparrows Point	Baltimore, MD
C	22	Ramiya White	6 ft 5 in (1.96 m)	Fr	Butler Traditional	Louisville, KY
F	34	Kayl Petersen	6 ft 0 in (1.83 m)	Fr	Waupun	Waupun, WI

Head coach

- Megan Duffy (Notre Dame)

Assistant coach(es)

- Itoro Coleman (Clemson)
- Sharnee Zoll-Norman (Virginia)
- Jen Hoover (Wake Forest)

Legend

- (C) Team captain
- (S) Suspended
- (I) Ineligible
- (W) Walk-on
- Injured
- Current redshirt

Roster

== Schedule ==
Date time, TV	Rank^{#}	Opponent^{#}	Result	Record	High points	High rebounds	High assists	Site (attendance) city, state
Exhibition
October 22, 2024*; 7:00 p.m.		Limestone	W 92–41	—	–	–	–	Cassell Coliseum; Blacksburg, VA
Regular season
November 4, 2024*; 5:00 p.m., ACCNX		UNC Wilmington	W 99–57	1–0	18 – Ekh	9 – Ekh	5 – Wenzel	Cassell Coliseum (5,064); Blacksburg, VA
November 10, 2024*; 5:30 p.m., ESPN2		vs. Iowa; Ally Tipoff	L 52–71	1–1	14 – Wenzel	7 – Tied	3 – Ekh	Spectrum Center (15,424); Charlotte, NC
November 13, 2024*; 6:00 p.m., ACCNX		UNC Asheville	W 85–62	2–1	25 – Wenzel	8 – Wenzel	4 – Baker	Cassell Coliseum (4,606); Blacksburg, VA
November 16, 2024*; 2:00 p.m., ACCNX		Coppin State	W 86–51	3–1	19 – Micheaux	11 – Micheaux	5 – Tied	Cassell Coliseum (4,890); Blacksburg, VA
November 19, 2024*; 6:00 p.m., ACCNX		Rutgers	W 91–80	4–1	19 – Wenzel	17 – Micheaux	4 – Suffren	Cassell Coliseum (4,644); Blacksburg, VA
November 23, 2024*; 2:00 p.m., ACCNX		Elon	W 87–69	5–1	19 – Micheaux	14 – Micheaux	10 – Micheaux	Cassell Coliseum (5,156); Blacksburg, VA
November 29, 2024*; 4:30 p.m., Women's; Sports Network		vs. Davidson; Fort Myers Tip-Off Shell Division semifinals	W 79–50	6–1	11 – Tied	9 – Micheaux	4 – Tied	Suncoast Credit Union Arena (540); Fort Myers, FL
November 30, 2024*; 7:30 p.m., Women's; Sports Network		vs. Michigan; Fort Myers Tip-Off Shell Division	L 65–76	6–2	15 – Baker	5 – Tied	5 – Wenzel	Suncoast Credit Union Arena (573); Fort Myers, FL
December 4, 2024*; 5:00 p.m., SECN		at Georgia; ACC–SEC Challenge	W 70–61	7–2	14 – Tied	9 – Micheaux	5 – Wenzel	Stegeman Coliseum (2,162); Athens, GA
December 8, 2024; 4:00 p.m., ACCN		at No. 8 Duke	L 59–81	7–3 (0–1)	19 – Wenzel	6 – Tied	3 – Suffren	Cameron Indoor Stadium (2,328); Durham, NC
December 15, 2024*; 4:00 p.m., ACCNX		Radford	W 73–34	8–3	23 – L. White	10 – Micheaux	9 – Nelson	Cassell Coliseum (5,421); Blacksburg, VA
December 21, 2024*; 12:00 p.m., ACCNX		Campbell	W 81–46	9–3	15 – Ekh	10 – Baker	5 – Tied	Cassell Coliseum (5,082); Blacksburg, VA
January 2, 2025; 6:00 p.m., ACCN		Florida State	L 74–105	9–4 (0–2)	16 – Micheaux	14 – Micheaux	3 – Tied	Cassell Coliseum (5,424); Blacksburg, VA
January 5, 2025; 12:00 p.m., ACCNX		at Miami (FL)	W 68–64	10–4 (1–2)	23 – Baker	9 – Baker	4 – Nelson	Watsco Center (2,553); Coral Gables, FL
January 9, 2025; 7:00 p.m., ACCNX		at No. 13 Georgia Tech	W 105–94 ^{2OT}	11–4 (2–2)	24 – Wenzel	12 – Micheaux	10 – Wenzel	McCamish Pavilion (1,518); Atlanta, GA
January 12, 2025; 2:00 p.m., ACCNX		Wake Forest	W 61–51	12–4 (3–2)	20 – Micheaux	9 – Micheaux	5 – Wenzel	Cassell Coliseum (5,502); Blacksburg, VA
January 16, 2025; 6:00 p.m., ACCNX		Virginia; Rivalry	L 65–73	12–5 (3–3)	15 – Micheaux	9 – Micheaux	4 – Nelson	Cassell Coliseum (5,473); Blacksburg, VA
January 19, 2025; 4:00 p.m., ACCN		Louisville	W 70–65	13–5 (4–3)	18 – White	6 – White	4 – Wenzel	Cassell Coliseum (8,925); Blacksburg, VA
January 23, 2025; 6:00 p.m., ACCNX		at Pittsburgh	W 84–57	14–5 (5–3)	16 – Wenzel	15 – Micheaux	5 – Nelson	Peterson Events Center (196); Pittsburgh, PA
January 26, 2025; 6:00 p.m., ACCN		at No. 20 NC State	L 57–85	14–6 (5–4)	18 – Wenzel	5 – Tied	2 – Tied	Reynolds Coliseum (5,500); Raleigh, NC
January 30, 2025; 6:00 p.m., ACCNX		No. 3 Notre Dame	L 61–77	14–7 (5–5)	17 – Baker	11 – Baker	3 – Tied	Cassell Coliseum (5,750); Blacksburg, VA
February 2, 2025; 2:00 p.m., ACCNX		SMU	W 79–71	15–7 (6–5)	23 – Ekh	9 – Baker	8 – Nelson	Cassell Coliseum (5,762); Blacksburg, VA
February 6, 2025; 6:00 p.m., ACCN		Syracuse	L 87–93	15–8 (6–6)	24 – Tied	9 – Baker	10 – Wenzel	Cassell Coliseum (4,902); Blacksburg, VA
February 9, 2025; 12:00 p.m., ACCN		at Virginia; Rivalry	W 87–62	16–8 (7–6)	17 – Tied	9 – Baker	9 – Wenzel	John Paul Jones Arena (5,639); Charlottesville, VA
February 13, 2025; 7:00 p.m., ACCNX		at No. 12 North Carolina	L 62–67	16–9 (7–7)	17 – Baker	7 – Baker	5 – Ekh	Carmichael Arena (2,502); Chapel Hill, NC
February 20, 2025; 8:00 p.m., ACCN		Stanford	L 74–75 ^{OT}	16–10 (7–8)	21 – Micheaux	13 – Micheaux	5 – Ekh	Cassell Coliseum (4,949); Blacksburg, VA
February 23, 2025; 2:00 p.m., ACCN		California	W 87–84	17–10 (8–8)	19 – Tied	5 – Baker	5 – Ekh	Cassell Coliseum (6,051); Blacksburg, VA
February 27, 2025; 7:00 p.m., ACCNX		at Boston College	L 89–92 ^{OT}	17–11 (8–9)	24 – Baker	8 – Baker	6 – Wenzel	Conte Forum (1,121); Chestnut Hill, MA
March 2, 2025; 2:00 p.m., ACCN		at Clemson	W 78–76	18–11 (9–9)	17 – Tied	6 – Baker	6 – Wenzel	Littlejohn Coliseum (2,032); Clemson, SC
ACC tournament
March 6, 2025; 1:30 p.m., ACCN	(8)	vs. (9) Georgia Tech; Second Round	L 57–72	18–12	19 – Micheaux	6 – Micheaux	4 – Wenzel	Greensboro Coliseum (11,203); Greensboro, NC
WBIT
March 20, 2025; 6:00 p.m., ESPN+	(1)	North Carolina A&T; First Round	W 61–48	19–12	18 – White	7 – White	6 – Nelson	Cassell Coliseum (2,290); Blacksburg, VA
March 23, 2025; 4:00 p.m., ESPN+	(1)	Texas Tech; Second Round	L 59–69	19–13	14 – Baker	6 – Baker	4 – Wenzel	Cassell Coliseum (2,664); Blacksburg, VA
*Non-conference game. ^{#}Rankings from AP Poll. (#) Tournament seedings in parentheses. All times are in Eastern.

== Rankings ==
Ranking movements Legend: ██ Increase in ranking ██ Decrease in ranking — = Not ranked RV = Received votes
	Week																				
Poll	Pre	1	2	3	4	5	6	7	8	9	10	11	12	13	14	15	16	17	18	19	Final
AP	—	—	—	—	—	—	—	—	—	—	—	—	—	—	—	—	—	—	—	—	
Coaches	RV	—	—	—	—	—	—	—	—	—	—	—	RV	—	—	—	—	—	—	—	
