= 2024–25 Radford Highlanders women's basketball team =

American college basketball season

2024–25 Radford Highlanders women's basketball
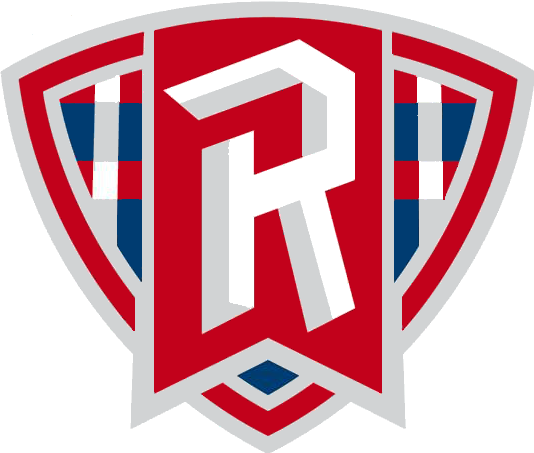
- Conference: Big South Conference
- Record: 14–17 (10–6 Big South)
- Head coach: Mike McGuire (12th season)
- Assistant coaches: Amber Easter; Morgan Williams; Ben Edelburg
- Home arena: Dedmon Center

2024–25 Big South women's basketball standings
| | Conf. | | | | Overall |
| Team | W | | L | PCT | W | | L | PCT |
|---|---|---|---|---|---|---|---|---|
| High Point † | 13 | – | 3 | .813 | 21 | – | 12 | .636 |
| Longwood | 11 | – | 5 | .688 | 22 | – | 12 | .647 |
| Radford | 10 | – | 6 | .625 | 14 | – | 17 | .452 |
| Charleston Southern | 10 | – | 6 | .625 | 14 | – | 16 | .467 |
| Winthrop | 9 | – | 7 | .563 | 16 | – | 15 | .516 |
| Gardner–Webb | 8 | – | 8 | .500 | 11 | – | 18 | .379 |
| USC Upstate | 6 | – | 10 | .375 | 9 | – | 21 | .300 |
| Presbyterian | 4 | – | 12 | .250 | 6 | – | 24 | .200 |
| UNC Asheville | 1 | – | 15 | .063 | 4 | – | 27 | .129 |
† 2025 Big South tournament winner

The 2024–25 Radford Highlanders women's basketball team represented Radford University during the 2024–25 NCAA Division I women's basketball season. The Highlanders, led by 12th-year head coach Mike McGuire, played their home games at the Dedmon Center in Radford, Virginia, as members of the Big South Conference.

== Previous season ==
The Highlanders finished the 2023–24 season 13–17, 9–7 in Big South play, to finish in third place. They would defeat Winthrop, and USC Upstate, before falling to Presbyterian in the Big South tournament championship game.

== Roster ==
2024–25 Radford Highlanders women's basketball team
Players
Coaches

| Pos. | # | Name | Height | Year | Previous school | Hometown |
|---|---|---|---|---|---|---|
| F | 0 | Laila Acox | 6 ft 0 in (1.83 m) | Sr | North Carolina A&T | Blythewood, South Carolina |
| G | 1 | Pa'Shence Traylor-Walker | 5 ft 8 in (1.73 m) | Jr | Central Arizona College | Franklin, Indiana |
| G | 2 | Reniya Jones | 5 ft 7 in (1.7 m) | Sr | UT Arlington | Washington, D.C. |
| G/F | 3 | Adriana Shipp-Davis | 5 ft 11 in (1.8 m) | GS | Longwood | Chesapeake, Virginia |
| G | 4 | Joi Williams | 5 ft 6 in (1.68 m) | So | Virginia Academy | Leesburg, Virginia |
| G | 5 | Kirah Dandridge | 5 ft 10 in (1.78 m) | Jr | St. Bonaventure | Richmond, Virginia |
| G | 8 | Cate Carlson | 5 ft 10 in (1.78 m) | So | William & Mary | Virginia Beach, Virginia |
| F | 10 | Taylor Napper | 6 ft 0 in (1.83 m) | Sr | St. Bonaventure | Lorton, Virginia |
| G | 11 | Ava Sawi | 5 ft 7 in (1.7 m) | Fr | Episcopal High School | Alexandria, Virginia |
| G | 12 | Arshae Jackson | 5 ft 10 in (1.78 m) | So | James River High School | Church Hill, Virginia |
| F | 15 | Kirby Brown | 6 ft 0 in (1.83 m) | Sr | Roane State | Hixson, Tennessee |
| G | 21 | Adelyn Traylor-Walker | 5 ft 8 in (1.73 m) | RS Fr | Bella Vista Prep | Franklin, Indiana |
| G | 23 | Makayla Firebaugh | 5 ft 10 in (1.78 m) | GS | Rider | Winchester, Virginia |
| F | 24 | Anna Stromberg | 6 ft 2 in (1.88 m) | Fr | Legacy Christian Academy | Andover, Minnesota |
| G | 32 | Angelina Nice | 6 ft 0 in (1.83 m) | Fr | Woodgrove High School | Round Hill, Virginia |
| G | 33 | Ellie Taylor | 5 ft 10 in (1.78 m) | GS | Northern Kentucky | Bardstown, Kentucky |

Head coach

- Mike McGuire (Roanoke)

Assistant coach(es)

- Amber Easter (George Mason)
- Morgan Williams (Georgetown)
- Ben Edelburg

Legend

- (C) Team captain
- (S) Suspended
- (I) Ineligible
- (W) Walk-on
- Injured
- Current redshirt

Roster
Last update: January 17, 2025

== Schedule and results ==
| Date time, TV | Rank^{#} | Opponent^{#} | Result | Record | Site (attendance) city, state |
Exhibition
| October 30, 2024*; 7:00 pm | | Ferrum | W 88–23 | – | Dedmon Center; Radford, VA |
Non-conference regular season
| November 4, 2024*; 11:00 am, ACCNX | | at No. 11 Duke | L 36–89 | 0–1 | Cameron Indoor Stadium (1,137); Durham, NC |
| November 7, 2024*; 11:00 am, ESPN+ | | Hampton | W 65–55 | 1–1 | Dedmon Center (3,000); Radford, VA |
| November 10, 2024*; 2:00 pm, ESPN+ | | Western Carolina | L 53–55 | 1–2 | Dedmon Center (902); Radford, VA |
| November 13, 2024*; 7:00 pm, ACCNX | | at Virginia | L 41–83 | 1–3 | John Paul Jones Arena (3,754); Charlottesville, VA |
| November 17, 2024*; 12:00 pm, Pass Tha Ball | | vs. Navy | L 73–78 ^{OT} | 1–4 | Colonial Hall (286); White Sulphur Springs, WV |
| November 20, 2024*; 7:00 pm | | at Norfolk State | L 65–71 | 1–5 | Joseph G. Echols Memorial Hall (819); Norfolk, VA |
| November 23, 2024*; 2:00 pm, ESPN+ | | Eastern Kentucky | L 40–87 | 1–6 | Dedmon Center (627); Radford, VA |
| December 4, 2024*; 11:00 am, ESPN+ | | at Loyola (MD) | L 64–70 ^{OT} | 1–7 | Reitz Arena (1,107); Baltimore, MD |
| December 8, 2024*; 2:00 pm, ACCNX | | at Clemson | L 48–74 | 1–8 | Littlejohn Coliseum (1,239); Clemson, SC |
| December 13, 2024*; 7:00 pm, ESPN+ | | at East Tennessee State | L 45–68 | 1–9 | Brooks Gymnasium (426); Johnson City, TN |
| December 15, 2024*; 4:00 pm, ACCNX | | at Virginia Tech | L 34–73 | 1–10 | Cassell Coliseum (5,421); Blacksburg, VA |
| December 20, 2024*; 3:30 pm, ESPN+ | | UVA Wise | W 96–54 | 2–10 | Dedmon Center (832); Radford, VA |
| December 29, 2024*; 2:00 pm, ESPN+ | | Bluefield | W 102–58 | 3–10 | Dedmon Center (644); Radford, VA |
Big South regular season
| January 2, 2025; 7:00 pm, ESPN+ | | High Point | L 55–67 | 3–11 (0–1) | Dedmon Center (579); Radford, VA |
| January 4, 2025; 2:00 pm, ESPN+ | | at Winthrop | L 58–65 | 3–12 (0–2) | Winthrop Coliseum (490); Rock Hill, SC |
| January 11, 2025; 2:00 pm, ESPN+ | | USC Upstate | W 64–56 | 4–12 (1–2) | Dedmon Center (638); Radford, VA |
| January 15, 2025; 7:00 pm, ESPN+ | | at Gardner–Webb | W 71–70 | 5–12 (2–2) | Paul Porter Arena (375); Boiling Springs, NC |
| January 18, 2025; 2:00 pm, ESPN+ | | Charleston Southern | W 74-62 | 6-12 (3-2) | Dedmon Center (643); Radford, VA |
| January 22, 2025; 7:00 pm, ESPN+ | | at Longwood | L 51-66 | 6-13 (3-3) | Joan Perry Brock Center (939); Farmville, VA |
| January 25, 2025; 2:00 pm, ESPN+ | | at Presbyterian | W 62-50 | 7-13 (4-3) | Templeton Center (416); Clinton, SC |
| January 29, 2025; 7:00 pm, ESPN+ | | UNC Asheville | W 63-47 | 8-13 (5-3) | Dedmon Center (772); Radford, VA |
| February 1, 2025; 4:00 pm, ESPN+ | | at USC Upstate | W 65-59 ^{OT} | 9-13 (6-3) | G. B. Hodge Center (234); Spartanburg, SC |
| February 5, 2025; 7:00 pm, ESPN+ | | at High Point | W 65-48 | 10-13 (7-3) | Qubein Center (687); High Point, NC |
| February 8, 2025; 2:00 pm, ESPN+ | | Longwood | W 80-67 | 11-13 (8-3) | Dedmon Center (879); Radford, VA |
| February 12, 2025; 7:00 pm, ESPN+ | | Winthrop | L 68-78 | 11-14 (8-4) | Dedmon Center (676); Radford, VA |
| February 19, 2025; 6:30 pm, ESPN+ | | at UNC Asheville | W 63-39 | 12-14 (9-4) | Kimmel Arena (148); Asheville, NC |
| February 22, 2025; 2:00 pm, ESPN+ | | Presbyterian | L 71-78 | 12-15 (9-5) | Dedmon Center (907); Radford, VA |
| February 26, 2025; 7:00 pm, ESPN+ | | Gardner–Webb | W 80-78 | 13-15 (10-5) | Dedmon Center (613); Radford, VA |
| March 1, 2025; 2:00 pm, ESPN+ | | at Charleston Southern | L 50-60 | 13-16 (10-6) | Buccaneer Field House (650); North Charleston, SC |
Big South tournament
| March 6, 2025; 8:30 pm, ESPN+ | (3) | vs. (6) Gardner-Webb; Quarterfinals | | | Freedom Hall Civic Center; Johnson City, TN |
*Non-conference game. ^{#}Rankings from AP Poll. (#) Tournament seedings in parentheses. All times are in Eastern.
