= 2024–25 UNC Asheville Bulldogs women's basketball team =

American college basketball season

2024–25 UNC Asheville Bulldogs women's basketball
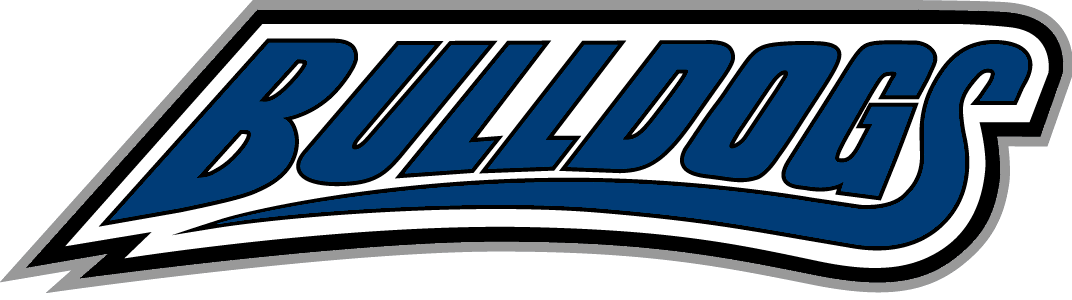
- Conference: Big South Conference
- Record: 3–27 (1–15 Big South)
- Head coach: Tynesha Lewis (1st season)
- Assistant coaches: Ron Woodard; Chasity Melvin; Quante Lee; Sha-Teisa Sharpe
- Home arena: Kimmel Arena

2024–25 Big South women's basketball standings
	Conf.				Overall
Team	W		L	PCT	W		L	PCT
High Point †	13	–	3	.813	21	–	12	.636
Longwood	11	–	5	.688	22	–	12	.647
Radford	10	–	6	.625	14	–	17	.452
Charleston Southern	10	–	6	.625	14	–	16	.467
Winthrop	9	–	7	.563	16	–	15	.516
Gardner–Webb	8	–	8	.500	11	–	18	.379
USC Upstate	6	–	10	.375	9	–	21	.300
Presbyterian	4	–	12	.250	6	–	24	.200
UNC Asheville	1	–	15	.063	4	–	27	.129
† 2025 Big South tournament winner

The 2024–25 UNC Asheville Bulldogs women's basketball team represented the University of North Carolina at Asheville during the 2024–25 NCAA Division I women's basketball season. The Bulldogs, led by first-year head coach Tynesha Lewis, played their home games at Kimmel Arena in Asheville, North Carolina, as members of the Big South Conference.

== Previous season ==
The Bulldogs finished the 2023–24 season 11–19, 4–12 in Big South play, to finish in last place. They would defeat Gardner–Webb, before falling to top-seeded High Point in the quarterfinals of the Big South tournament.

On March 19, 2024, the school announced that they would be parting ways with head coach Honey Brown, ending her four-year tenure with the team. On April 12, the school announced that they would be hiring Elizabeth City State head coach Tynesha Lewis as Brown's successor.

== Roster ==
2024–25 UNC Asheville Bulldogs women's basketball team
Players
Coaches

Pos.	#	Name	Height	Year	Previous school	Hometown
G	0	LaImani Simmons	5 ft 9 in (1.75 m)	Sr	High Point	Greenville, South Carolina
G	1	Jordan Tuff	5 ft 8 in (1.73 m)	GS	Miami (OH)	Kernersville, North Carolina
G	2	Taylor Wilkins	5 ft 10 in (1.78 m)	RS Jr	McNeese	New Orleans, Louisiana
G	3	Trinity Fields	5 ft 4 in (1.63 m)	So	Brentwood Academy	Old Hickory, Tennessee
G	4	Trinity Barnes	5 ft 7 in (1.7 m)	Jr	Triton College	Gary, Indiana
F	5	Nycerra Minnis (5Y)	6 ft 3 in (1.91 m)	Sr	Virginia	Riverdale, Maryland
G	10	Skylar Bailey	5 ft 8 in (1.73 m)	Sr	Tallahassee State College	Vienna, Georgia
G	12	Alana Swift	5 ft 6 in (1.68 m)	GS	Graceland	Philadelphia, Pennsylvania
F	13	Jazlyn Ware	6 ft 1 in (1.85 m)	Fr	Stockbridge High School	McDonough, Georgia
F	15	Briauna Thompson (6Y)	6 ft 3 in (1.91 m)	Sr	South Carolina State	Montgomery, Alabama
G	20	Dakota McCaughan (5Y)	5 ft 5 in (1.65 m)	Sr	USC Upstate	Secane, Pennsylvania
F	21	Sydney Burris	6 ft 0 in (1.83 m)	Jr	Jefferson College	Milwaukee, Wisconsin
F	23	Laney Bone	5 ft 11 in (1.8 m)	Sr	Longwood	Chattanooga, Tennessee
F	30	Deborah Orianegbena	6 ft 2 in (1.88 m)	Fr	Victory Christian Center School	Edo State, Nigeria
F	45	Abigail Wilson (5Y)	5 ft 11 in (1.8 m)	Sr	West Rowan High School	China Grove, North Carolina

Head coach

- Tynesha Lewis (NC State)

Assistant coach(es)

- Ron Woodard (Norfolk State)
- Chasity Melvin (NC State)
- Quante Lee (NC State)
- Sha-Teisa Sharpe (Elizabeth City State)

Legend

- (C) Team captain
- (S) Suspended
- (I) Ineligible
- (W) Walk-on
- (5Y) Fifth-year senior
- (6Y) Sixth-year senior
- Injured
- Current redshirt

Roster
Last update: January 20, 2025

== Schedule and results ==
Date time, TV	Rank^{#}	Opponent^{#}	Result	Record	Site (attendance) city, state
Non-conference regular season
November 4, 2024*; 7:00 pm, ESPN+		at Mercer	L 52–75	0–1	Hawkins Arena (727); Macon, GA
November 13, 2024*; 6:00 pm, ACCNX		at Virginia Tech	L 62–85	0–2	Cassell Coliseum (4,606); Blacksburg, VA
November 15, 2024*; 6:30 pm, ESPN+		Charlotte	L 47–59	0–3	Kimmel Arena (316); Asheville, NC
November 19, 2024*; 11:00 am, ESPN+		at UNC Greensboro	L 48–59	0–4	Fleming Gymnasium (763); Greensboro, NC
November 23, 2024*; 2:00 pm, ESPN+		at Loyola (MD)	L 51–67	0–5	Reitz Arena (420); Baltimore, MD
November 26, 2024*; 11:00 am, ESPN+		at Wofford	L 56–75	0–6	Jerry Richardson Indoor Stadium (1,324); Spartanburg, SC
November 30, 2024*; 4:00 pm, ESPN+		at Tennessee State	L 87–92 ^{OT}	0–7	Gentry Center (75); Nashville, TN
December 4, 2024*; 11:30 am, ESPN+		Warren Wilson	W 98–23	1–7	Kimmel Arena (1,425); Asheville, NC
December 11, 2024*; 6:30 pm, ESPN+		Furman	L 50–68	1–8	Kimmel Arena (723); Asheville, NC
December 14, 2024*; 2:00 pm, ESPN+		at North Florida	L 57–73	1–9	UNF Arena (279); Jacksonville, FL
December 17, 2024*; 4:30 pm, ESPN+		East Tennessee State	L 47–53	1–10	Kimmel Arena (316); Asheville, NC
December 21, 2024*; 4:00 pm, ESPN+/CW62		Western Carolina	L 64–77	1–11	Kimmel Arena (253); Asheville, NC
December 30, 2024*; 4:30 pm, ESPN+		Brevard	W 79–45	2–11	Kimmel Arena (252); Asheville, NC
Big South regular season
January 4, 2025; 2:00 pm, ESPN+		at High Point	L 53–84	2–12 (0–1)	Kimmel Arena (1,281); Asheville, NC
January 8, 2025; 6:30 pm, ESPN+		Longwood	L 51–95	2–13 (0–2)	Kimmel Arena (194); Asheville, NC
January 11, 2025; 2:00 pm, ESPN+		Presbyterian	L 56–60	2–16 (0–3)	Kimmel Arena (184); Asheville, NC
January 15, 2025; 6:00 pm, ESPN+		at USC Upstate	L 57–60	2–15 (0–4)	G. B. Hodge Center (240); Spartanburg, SC
January 18, 2025; 2:00 pm, ESPN+		at Winthrop	L 43–63	2–16 (0–5)	Winthrop Coliseum (491); Rock Hill, SC
January 22, 2025; 6:00 pm, ESPN+/CW62		Gardner–Webb	L 65-77	2-17 (0-6)	Kimmel Arena (239); Asheville, NC
January 25, 2025; 1:00 pm, ESPN+		at Charleston Southern	L 52-57	2-18 (0-7)	Buccaneer Field House (578); North Charleston, SC
January 29, 2025; 7:00 pm, ESPN+		at Radford	L 47-63	2-19 (0-8)	Dedmon Center (772); Radford, VA
February 5, 2025; 7:00 pm, ESPN+		at Gardner–Webb	L 72-79	2-20 (0-9)	Paul Porter Arena (570); Boiling Springs, NC
February 8, 2025; 2:00 pm, ESPN+		High Point	L 52-66	2-21 (0-10)	Kimmel Arena (381); Asheville, NC
February 12, 2025; 6:30 pm, ESPN+		USC Upstate	L 51-60	2-22 (0-11)	Kimmel Arena (231); Asheville, NC
February 15, 2025; 2:00 pm, ESPN+		Charleston Southern	L 51-60	2-23 (0-12)	Kimmel Arena (597); Asheville, NC
February 19, 2025; 6:30 pm, ESPN+		Radford	L 39-63	2-24 (0-13)	Kimmel Arena (148); Asheville, NC
February 22, 2025; 6:00 pm, ESPN+		at Longwood	L 59-67	2-25 (0-14)	Joan Perry Brock Center (1,179); Farmville, VA
February 26, 2025; 6:30 pm, ESPN+		at Presbyterian	W 67-60	3-25 (1-14)	Templeton Center (351); Clinton, SC
March 1, 2025; 2:00 pm, ESPN+		Winthrop	L 66-71	3-26 (1-15)	Kimmel Arena (483); Asheville, NC
Big South tournament
March 5, 2025; 5:00 pm, ESPN+	(9)	vs. (8) Presbyterian; Opening Round			Freedom Hall Civic Center; Johnson City, TN
*Non-conference game. ^{#}Rankings from AP Poll. (#) Tournament seedings in parentheses. All times are in Eastern.
