= 2024–25 Gardner–Webb Runnin' Bulldogs women's basketball team =

American college basketball season

2024–25 Gardner–Webb Runnin' Bulldogs women's basketball
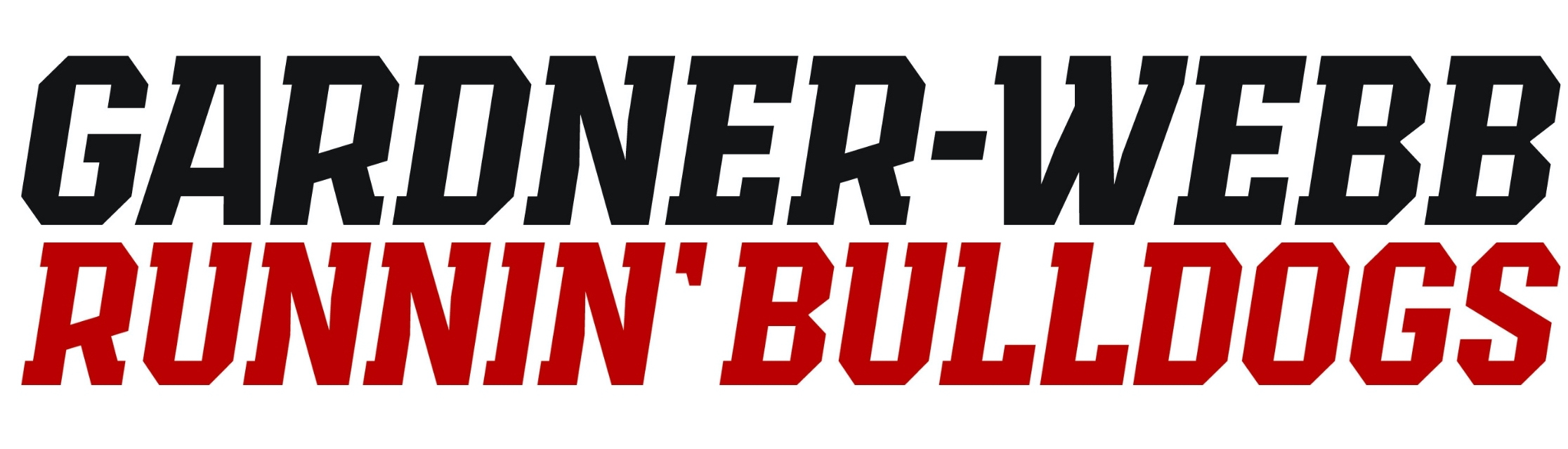
- Conference: Big South Conference
- Record: 6–12 (3–3 Big South)
- Head coach: Scott Merritt (2nd season)
- Assistant coaches: Lauren Holden; Katie Nelson; Tierra Floyd
- Home arena: Paul Porter Arena

2024–25 Big South women's basketball standings
	Conf.				Overall
Team	W		L	PCT	W		L	PCT
High Point †	13	–	3	.813	21	–	12	.636
Longwood	11	–	5	.688	22	–	12	.647
Radford	10	–	6	.625	14	–	17	.452
Charleston Southern	10	–	6	.625	14	–	16	.467
Winthrop	9	–	7	.563	16	–	15	.516
Gardner–Webb	8	–	8	.500	11	–	18	.379
USC Upstate	6	–	10	.375	9	–	21	.300
Presbyterian	4	–	12	.250	6	–	24	.200
UNC Asheville	1	–	15	.063	4	–	27	.129
† 2025 Big South tournament winner

The 2024–25 Gardner–Webb Runnin' Bulldogs women's basketball team represented Gardner–Webb University during the 2024–25 NCAA Division I women's basketball season. The Runnin' Bulldogs, led by second-year head coach Scott Merritt, played their home games at Paul Porter Arena in Boiling Springs, North Carolina as members of the Big South Conference.

In February 2025, it was reported that assistant coach Katie Nelson assumed head coaching duties, without a reason given for Merritt's dismissal.

== Previous season ==
The Runnin' Bulldogs finished the 2023–24 season 6–24, 5–11 in Big South play, to finish in eighth place. They would be defeated by UNC Asheville in the opening round of the Big South tournament.

== Roster ==
2024–25 Gardner–Webb Runnin' Bulldogs women's basketball team
Players
Coaches

Pos.	#	Name	Height	Year	Previous school	Hometown
G	1	Kayla Martin	5 ft 8 in (1.73 m)	So	St. Francis Prep	Cambria Heights, New York
G	2	Amina Gray	5 ft 6 in (1.68 m)	So	Example Academy	DeKalb, Illinois
G	3	Lauren Bailey	5 ft 8 in (1.73 m)	So	Greeneville High School	Greeneville, Tennessee
G	5	Anaya Harris	5 ft 9 in (1.75 m)	So	North Raleigh Christian Academy	Raleigh, North Carolina
G	10	Nyla Walker	5 ft 4 in (1.63 m)	Jr	USC Upstate	Frankfort, Illinois
F	13	Andrea Martinez	6 ft 1 in (1.85 m)	So	Boet Mataró	Barcelona, Spain
C	14	Maja Rohkohl	6 ft 4 in (1.93 m)	Fr	Greensboro Day School	Hanover, Germany
G	22	Kendall Scott	5 ft 7 in (1.7 m)	Fr	Chancellor High School	Fredericksburg, Virginia
G	23	Ashley Hawkins	5 ft 6 in (1.68 m)	Sr	Cypress College	Long Beach, California
G	25	Elle Blatchford	5 ft 10 in (1.78 m)	So	Southern Miss	Canton, Georgia
F	32	Regina Yáñez Enriquez	6 ft 3 in (1.91 m)	Fr	Cushing Academy	Mexico City, Mexico
G/F	33	Elze Motekaityte	6 ft 2 in (1.88 m)	GS	VCU	Klaipėda, Lithuania

Head coach

- Scott Merritt (Marquette)

Assistant coach(es)

- Lauren Holden (Fordham)
- Katie Nelson (Boston University)
- Tierra Floyd (Delaware State)

Legend

- (C) Team captain
- (S) Suspended
- (I) Ineligible
- (W) Walk-on
- Injured
- Current redshirt

Roster
Last update: January 18, 2025

== Schedule and results ==
Date time, TV	Rank^{#}	Opponent^{#}	Result	Record	Site (attendance) city, state
Non-conference regular season
November 4, 2024*; 7:00 pm, ESPN+		West Georgia	W 67–63	1–0	Paul Porter Arena (225); Boiling Springs, NC
November 8, 2024*; 7:00 pm, FloHoops		at Elon	L 61–69	1–1	Schar Center (558); Elon, NC
November 12, 2024*; 11:00 am, ESPN+		East Tennessee State	L 42–44	1–2	Paul Porter Arena (1,500); Boiling Springs, NC
November 15, 2024*; 11:00 am, ESPN+		at Richmond	L 44–92	1–3	Robins Center (2,914); Richmond, VA
November 17, 2024*; 2:00 pm, ESPN+		at James Madison	L 69–102	1–4	Atlantic Union Bank Center (2,240); Harrisonburg, VA
November 21, 2024*; 6:30 pm, ESPN+		at Charlotte	L 67–83	1–5	Dale F. Halton Arena (560); Charlotte, NC
November 23, 2024*; 1:00 pm, ESPN+		Johnson C. Smith	W 88–67	2–5	Paul Porter Arena (55); Boiling Springs, NC
November 27, 2024*; 6:30 pm, ESPN+		at Appalachian State	L 64–82	2–6	Holmes Center (392); Boone, NC
December 1, 2024*; 2:00 pm, ACCNX		at Wake Forest	L 52–73	2–7	LJVM Coliseum (843); Winston-Salem, NC
December 6, 2024*; 11:00 am, ESPN+		at Western Carolina	W 73–65	3–7	Ramsey Center (1,740); Cullowhee, NC
December 17, 2024*; 7:00 pm, FloHoops		at Hampton	L 67–76	3–8	Hampton Convocation Center (217); Hampton, VA
December 20, 2024*; 3:00 pm, ESPN+		Queens	L 97–99 ^{3OT}	3–9	Paul Porter Arena (375); Boiling Springs, NC
Big South regular season
January 2, 2025; 7:00 pm, ESPN+		Charleston Southern	L 65–67	3–10 (0–1)	Paul Porter Arena (50); Boiling Springs, NC
January 4, 2025; 2:00 pm, ESPN+		at Presbyterian	W 62–58	4–10 (1–1)	Templeton Center (263); Clinton, SC
January 8, 2025; 6:00 pm, ESPN+		at Winthrop	L 49–63	4–11 (1–2)	Winthrop Coliseum (334); Rock Hill, SC
January 11, 2025; 1:00 pm, ESPN+		High Point	W 64–52	5–11 (2–2)	Paul Porter Arena (148); Boiling Springs, NC
January 15, 2025; 7:00 pm, ESPN+		Radford	L 70–71	5–12 (2–3)	Paul Porter Arena (375); Boiling Springs, NC
January 18, 2025; 1:00 pm, ESPN+		USC Upstate	W 79–73	6–12 (3–3)	Paul Porter Arena (378); Boiling Springs, NC
January 22, 2025; 6:00 pm, CW62/ESPN+		at UNC Asheville	W 77-65	7-12 (4-3)	Kimmel Arena (239); Asheville, NC
January 29, 2025; 7:00 pm, ESPN+		at Longwood	L 52-64	7-13 (4-4)	Joan Perry Brock Center (969); Farmville, VA
February 1, 2025; 1:00 pm, ESPN+		Winthrop	W 66-54	8-13 (5-4)	Paul Porter Arena (300); Boiling Springs, NC
February 5, 2025; 7:00 pm, ESPN+		UNC Asheville	W 79-72	9-13 (6-4)	Paul Porter Arena (570); Boiling Springs, NC
February 8, 2025; 2:00 pm, ESPN+		at Charleston Southern	W 64-51	10-13 (7-4)	Buccaneer Field House (650); North Charleston, SC
February 15, 2025; 12:00 pm, ESPN+		at USC Upstate	L 59-68	10-14 (7-5)	G. B. Hodge Center (233); Spartanburg, SC
February 19, 2025; 7:00 pm, ESPN+		Longwood	L 46-75	10-15 (7-6)	Paul Porter Arena (750); Boiling Springs, NC
February 22, 2025; 2:00 pm, ESPN+		at High Point	L 63-71	10-16 (7-7)	Qubein Center (973); High Point, NC
February 26, 2025; 7:00 pm, ESPN+		at Radford	L 78-80	10-17 (7-8)	Dedmon Center (613); Radford, VA
March 1, 2025; 1:00 pm, ESPN+		Presbyterian	W 91-81	11-17 (8-8)	Paul Porter Arena (378); Boiling Springs, NC
Big South tournament
March 6, 2025; 8:30 pm, ESPN+	(6)	vs. (3) Radford; Quarterfinals	L 63–69	11–18	Freedom Hall Civic Center; Johnson City, TN
*Non-conference game. ^{#}Rankings from AP Poll. (#) Tournament seedings in parentheses. All times are in Eastern.
