= 2024–25 High Point Panthers women's basketball team =

American college basketball season

2024–25 High Point Panthers women's basketball

Big South regular season & tournament champions

NCAA tournament, First Four
- Conference: Big South Conference
- Record: 21–12 (13–3 Big South)
- Head coach: Chelsea Banbury (6th season)
- Assistant coaches: Brittany Brown; Katie Clayman; Brendan Quinlan-Huertas; Callie Scheier; Elise Fralin
- Home arena: Qubein Center

2024–25 Big South women's basketball standings
	Conf.				Overall
Team	W		L	PCT	W		L	PCT
High Point †	13	–	3	.813	21	–	12	.636
Longwood	11	–	5	.688	22	–	12	.647
Radford	10	–	6	.625	14	–	17	.452
Charleston Southern	10	–	6	.625	14	–	16	.467
Winthrop	9	–	7	.563	16	–	15	.516
Gardner–Webb	8	–	8	.500	11	–	18	.379
USC Upstate	6	–	10	.375	9	–	21	.300
Presbyterian	4	–	12	.250	6	–	24	.200
UNC Asheville	1	–	15	.063	4	–	27	.129
† 2025 Big South tournament winner

The 2024–25 High Point Panthers women's basketball team represented High Point University during the 2024–25 NCAA Division I women's basketball season. The Panthers, led by sixth-year head coach Chelsea Banbury, played their home games at the Qubein Center in High Point, North Carolina as members of the Big South Conference.

== Previous season ==
The Panthers finished the 2023–24 season 20–12, 14–2 in Big South play, to finish as Big South regular-season champions. They defeated UNC Asheville, before being upset by #5 seed and eventual tournament champions Presbyterian in the semifinals of the Big South tournament. They received an automatic bid to the WBIT, where they were defeated by Virginia in the first round.

== Roster ==
2024–25 High Point Panthers women's basketball team
Players
Coaches

Pos.	#	Name	Height	Year	Previous school	Hometown
G	1	Olivia Medford	5 ft 11 in (1.8 m)	Sr	Indiana State	Rockville Centre, NY
G	2	Nakyah Terrell	5 ft 6 in (1.68 m)	Sr	McKinley High School	Canton, OH
F	3	Nevaeh Zavala	6 ft 0 in (1.83 m)	Jr	Royse City High School	Plano, TX
G	5	Chana Paxixe	5 ft 8 in (1.73 m)	Jr	Cochise College	Beira, Mozambique
G	6	Dakota Phillips	5 ft 9 in (1.75 m)	Fr	Hart County High School	Hartwell, GA
G	7	Lauren Scott	5 ft 5 in (1.65 m)	Sr	Claflin	Columbia, SC
F	8	Annalise Lindsay	5 ft 10 in (1.78 m)	Fr	Miami Palmetto Senior High School	Miami, FL
G	9	Dom Nesland	5 ft 9 in (1.75 m)	Fr	Xavier College Prep	Phoenix, AZ
G	11	Kenaya Klintman	5 ft 10 in (1.78 m)	Fr	Marksgymnasieskola	Malmö, Sweden
G	14	Anna Häger	6 ft 0 in (1.83 m)	Jr	Luleå Gymnasieskola	Gothenburg, Sweden
G	21	Emma Larios	5 ft 7 in (1.7 m)	RS Fr	Asheville Christian Academy	Asheville, NC
G	22	Shakira Baskerville	6 ft 1 in (1.85 m)	Sr	West Forsyth High School	Clemmons, NC
F	23	Ariana Wilkes	6 ft 2 in (1.88 m)	Jr	Hampton	Columbia, SC
G	24	Jaleesa Lawrence	5 ft 10 in (1.78 m)	Sr	Eastern Washington	Meridian, ID
G	25	Aaliyah Collins	5 ft 6 in (1.68 m)	Sr	Grand Canyon	Snohomish, WA
F	31	Audrey Meyers	6 ft 0 in (1.83 m)	GS	Western Carolina	Columbia, SC
F	33	Peyton Gerdes	6 ft 0 in (1.83 m)	RS Fr	Grayslake North High School	Lake Villa, IL

Head coach

- Chelsea Banbury (Florida Gulf Coast)

Assistant coach(es)

- Brittany Brown (Florida Gulf Coast)
- Katie Clayman (Oregon)
- Brendan Quinlan-Huertas (High Point)
- Callie Scheier (High Point)
- Elise Fralin (High Point)

Legend

- (C) Team captain
- (S) Suspended
- (I) Ineligible
- (W) Walk-on
- Injured
- Current redshirt

Roster
Last update: January 16, 2025

== Schedule and results ==
Date time, TV	Rank^{#}	Opponent^{#}	Result	Record	Site (attendance) city, state
Non-conference regular season
November 4, 2024*; 6:00 p.m., FloHoops		at Elon	L 65–66	0–1	Schar Center (321); Elon, NC
November 7, 2024*; 7:00 p.m.		Guilford	W 100–47	1–1	Qubein Center (1,145); High Point, NC
November 10, 2024*; 2:00 p.m., ESPN+		Davidson	W 56–53	2–1	Qubein Center (789); High Point, NC
November 14, 2024*; 7:00 p.m., ESPN+		at Campbell	L 47–60	2–2	Gore Arena (705); Buies Creek, NC
November 17, 2024*; 12:00 p.m., ESPN+		Denver	W 63–55	3–2	Qubein Center (783); High Point, NC
November 21, 2024*; 7:00 p.m., ESPN+		at Wofford	L 65–71	3–3	Jerry Richardson Indoor Stadium (311); Spartanburg, SC
November 29, 2024*; 1:30 p.m., FloHoops		vs. No. 12 West Virginia; Gulf Coast Showcase first round	L 54–89	3–4	Hertz Arena (277); Estero, FL
November 30, 2024*; 11:00 a.m., FloHoops		vs. Illinois State; Gulf Coast Showcase consolation 2nd round	L 49–70	3–5	Hertz Arena (203); Estero, FL
December 1, 2024*; 11:00 a.m., FloHoops		vs. Santa Clara; Gulf Coast Showcase 7th-place game	L 65–74	3–6	Hertz Arena (203); Estero, FL
December 6, 2024*; 5:00 p.m., ESPN+		Winston-Salem State	W 90–54	4–6	Qubein Center (671); High Point, NC
December 14, 2024*; 1:30 p.m., ESPN+		at Stetson	L 72–76	4–7	Insight Credit Union Arena (117); DeLand, FL
December 17, 2024*; 7:00 p.m., ESPN+		at UCF	W 64–60	5–7	Addition Financial Arena (1,003); Orlando, FL
December 21, 2024*; 2:00 p.m., ESPN+		Austin Peay	L 46–59	5–8	Qubein Center (580); High Point, NC
Big South regular season
January 2, 2025; 7:00 p.m., ESPN+		at Radford	W 67–55	6–8 (1–0)	Dedmon Center (579); Radford, VA
January 4, 2025; 2:00 p.m., ESPN+		UNC Asheville	W 84–53	7–8 (2–0)	Qubein Center (1,281); High Point, NC
January 8, 2025; 7:00 p.m., ESPN+		Charleston Southern	W 78–51	8–8 (3–0)	Qubein Center (958); High Point, NC
January 11, 2025; 1:00 p.m., ESPN+		at Gardner–Webb	L 52–64	8–9 (3–1)	Paul Porter Arena (148); Boiling Springs, NC
January 15, 2025; 7:00 p.m., ESPN+		Longwood	L 68–72	8–10 (3–2)	Qubein Center (782); High Point, NC
January 18, 2025; 2:00 p.m., ESPN+		at Presbyterian	W 75–47	9–10 (4–2)	Templeton Center (345); Clinton, SC
January 22, 2025; 7:00 p.m., ESPN+		USC Upstate	W 84–31	10–10 (5–2)	Qubein Center (736); High Point, NC
January 25, 2025; 2:00 p.m., ESPN+		at Winthrop	W 73–55	11–10 (6–2)	Winthrop Coliseum (339); Rock Hill, SC
February 1, 2025; 7:00 p.m., ESPN+		Presbyterian	W 62–43	12–10 (7–2)	Qubein Center (721); High Point, NC
February 5, 2025; 7:00 p.m., ESPN+		Radford	L 48–65	12–11 (7–3)	Qubein Center (687); High Point, NC
February 8, 2025; 2:00 p.m., ESPN+		at UNC Asheville	W 66–52	13–11 (8–3)	Kimmel Arena (381); Asheville, NC
February 12, 2025; 7:00 p.m., ESPN+		at Longwood	W 70–61	14–11 (9–3)	Joan Perry Brock Center (978); Farmville, VA
February 15, 2025; 7:00 p.m., ESPN+		Winthrop	W 69–56	15–11 (10–3)	Qubein Center (684); High Point, NC
February 19, 2025; 6:00 p.m., ESPN+		at Charleston Southern	W 68–52	16–11 (11–3)	Buccaneer Field House (425); North Charleston, SC
February 22, 2025; 2:00 p.m., ESPN+		Gardner–Webb	W 71–63	17–11 (12–3)	Qubein Center (973); High Point, NC
February 26, 2025; 7:00 p.m., ESPN+		at USC Upstate	W 72–47	18–11 (13–3)	G. B. Hodge Center (279); Spartanburg, SC
Big South tournament
March 6, 2025; 11:30 a.m., ESPN+	(1)	vs. (9) UNC Asheville; Quarterfinals	W 85–57	19–11	Freedom Hall Civic Center; Johnson City, TN
March 8, 2025; 6:00 p.m., ESPN+	(1)	vs. (5) Winthrop; Semifinals	W 64–49	20–11	Freedom Hall Civic Center (1,158); Johnson City, TN
March 9, 2025; 6:00 p.m., ESPN2	(1)	vs. (2) Longwood; Championship	W 59–53	21–11	Freedom Hall Civic Center (1,011); Johnson City, TN
NCAA tournament - Birmingham Regional 3
March 20, 2025; 9:00 p.m., ESPN2	(16 B3)	vs. (16 B3) William & Mary; First Four	L 63–69	21–12	Moody Center (629); Austin, Texas
*Non-conference game. ^{#}Rankings from AP poll. (#) Tournament seedings in parentheses. All times are in Eastern.
