= 2024–25 Longwood Lancers women's basketball team =

American college basketball season

2024–25 Longwood Lancers women's basketball

WNIT, First Round
- Conference: Big South Conference
- Record: 22–12 (11–5 Big South)
- Head coach: Erika Lang-Montgomery (3rd season)
- Assistant coaches: Landis F. McCoy; Rachel Balzer; Ivana Boyd
- Home arena: Joan Perry Brock Center

2024–25 Big South women's basketball standings
	Conf.				Overall
Team	W		L	PCT	W		L	PCT
High Point †	13	–	3	.813	21	–	12	.636
Longwood	11	–	5	.688	22	–	12	.647
Radford	10	–	6	.625	14	–	17	.452
Charleston Southern	10	–	6	.625	14	–	16	.467
Winthrop	9	–	7	.563	16	–	15	.516
Gardner–Webb	8	–	8	.500	11	–	18	.379
USC Upstate	6	–	10	.375	9	–	21	.300
Presbyterian	4	–	12	.250	6	–	24	.200
UNC Asheville	1	–	15	.063	4	–	27	.129
† 2025 Big South tournament winner

The 2024–25 Longwood Lancers women's basketball team represented Longwood University during the 2024–25 NCAA Division I women's basketball season. The Lancers, led by third-year head coach Erika Lang-Montgomery, played their home games at the Joan Perry Brock Center in Farmville, Virginia as members of the Big South Conference.

== Previous season ==
The Lancers finished the 2023–24 season 9–20, 6–10 in Big South play, to finish in seventh place. They were defeated by USC Upstate in the quarterfinals of the Big South tournament.

== Roster ==
2024–25 Longwood Lancers women's basketball team
Players
Coaches

Pos.	#	Name	Height	Year	Previous school	Hometown
F	0	Otaifo Esenabhalu	6 ft 2 in (1.88 m)	So	Lowndes High School	Valdosta, GA
G	1	Kiki McIntyre	5 ft 6 in (1.68 m)	GS	Saint Leo	Boston, MA
G	2	Jaci Bolden	5 ft 7 in (1.7 m)	Jr	Cape Fear Community College	Conyers, GA
G	3	Lili Booker	5 ft 6 in (1.68 m)	Fr	Mallard Creek High School	Charlotte, NC
G	5	Jaelyn Brown	5 ft 8 in (1.73 m)	So	Bryant & Stratton College	Suffolk, VA
G	10	Malea Brown	5 ft 5 in (1.65 m)	Sr	Santa Fe College	Putnam Hall, FL
G	12	Olivia Bowes	6 ft 0 in (1.83 m)	Fr	Catholic High School	Chesapeake, VA
F	13	Frances Ulysse	6 ft 1 in (1.85 m)	So	Vanier College	Montreal, QC
G	20	Nalani Simmons	5 ft 8 in (1.73 m)	So	Deep Creek High School	Chesapeake, VA
G/F	21	JaMya Robinson	5 ft 11 in (1.8 m)	Jr	Indian River State College	Muskegon, MI
G	24	Amor Harris	5 ft 9 in (1.75 m)	So	Alexandria City High School	Alexandria, VA
G	25	Mariah Wilson	5 ft 10 in (1.78 m)	Sr	Towson	Lancaster, PA
F	30	Montgomery Bedford	6 ft 2 in (1.88 m)	Fr	Baltimore City College	Baltimore, MD

Head coach

- Erika Lang-Montgomery (Florida)

Assistant coach(es)

- Landis F. McCoy (Bethune–Cookman)
- Rachel Balzer (George Mason)
- Ivana Boyd (Flagler)

Legend

- (C) Team captain
- (S) Suspended
- (I) Ineligible
- (W) Walk-on
- Injured
- Current redshirt

Roster
Last update: January 15, 2025

== Schedule and results ==
Date time, TV	Rank^{#}	Opponent^{#}	Result	Record	Site (attendance) city, state
Non-conference regular season
November 4, 2024*; 5:00 p.m., ESPN+		Lincoln (PA)	W 81–70	1–0	Joan Perry Brock Center (1,124); Farmville, VA
November 7, 2024*; 7:00 p.m.		at Norfolk State	L 62–71	1–1	Echols Hall (884); Norfolk, VA
November 10, 2024*; 12:00 p.m., ESPN+		Hood	W 102–21	2–1	Joan Perry Brock Center (1,036); Farmville, VA
November 13, 2024*; 7:00 p.m., ESPN+		at American	W 59–41	3–1	Bender Arena (528); Washington, D.C.
November 16, 2024*; 11:00 a.m., ESPN+		at Georgia Southern	L 64–68	3–2	Hanner Fieldhouse (503); Statesboro, GA
November 18, 2024*; 7:00 p.m., ESPN+		at Queens	W 80–66	4–2	Curry Arena (207); Charlotte, NC
November 23, 2024*; 1:00 p.m., ESPN+		Navy	L 61–75	4–3	Joan Perry Brock Center (1,092); Farmville, VA
November 26, 2024*; 6:00 p.m., ESPN+		Elon	L 67–74	4–4	Joan Perry Brock Center (907); Farmville, VA
December 6, 2024*; 11:00 a.m., ESPN+		South Carolina State; Shirley Duncan Classic	W 67–60	5–4	Joan Perry Brock Center (1,837); Farmville, VA
December 7, 2024*; 4:00 p.m., ESPN+		William & Mary; Shirley Duncan Classic	W 53–44	6–4	Joan Perry Brock Center (1,123); Farmville, VA
December 8, 2024*; 3:30 p.m., ESPN+		McNeese; Shirley Duncan Classic	W 81–54	7–4	Joan Perry Brock Center (1,941); Farmville, VA
December 15, 2024*; 12:00 p.m., SECN+		at Florida	L 65–93	7–5	O'Connell Center (1,334); Gainesville, FL
December 18, 2024*; 2:00 p.m.		at Webber International	W 105–38	8–5	Sabbagh Athletic Center (85); Babson Park, FL
December 29, 2024*; 1:00 p.m., FloHoops		at UNC Wilmington	W 84–68	9–5	Trask Coliseum (918); Wilmington, NC
Big South regular season
January 2, 2025; 2:00 p.m., ESPN+		Presbyterian	W 68–56	10–5 (1–0)	Joan Perry Brock Center (972); Farmville, VA
January 4, 2025; 2:00 p.m., ESPN+		at Charleston Southern	W 73–72	11–5 (2–0)	Buccaneer Field House (321); North Charleston, SC
January 8, 2025; 6:30 p.m., ESPN+		at UNC Asheville	W 95–51	12–5 (3–0)	Kimmel Arena (194); Asheville, NC
January 11, 2025; 6:00 p.m., ESPN+		Winthrop	W 77–59	13–5 (4–0)	Joan Perry Brock Center (923); Farmville, VA
January 15, 2025; 7:00 p.m., ESPN+		at High Point	W 72–68	14–5 (5–0)	Qubein Center (782); High Point, NC
January 22, 2025; 7:00 p.m., ESPN+		Radford	W 56–51	15–5 (6–0)	Joan Perry Brock Center (939); Farmville, VA
January 25, 2025; 2:00 p.m., ESPN+		at USC Upstate	L 45–46	15–6 (6–1)	G. B. Hodge Center (228); Spartanburg, SC
January 29, 2025; 7:00 p.m., ESPN+		Gardner–Webb	W 64–52	16–6 (7–1)	Joan Perry Brock Center (969); Farmville, VA
February 1, 2025; 6:00 p.m., ESPN+		Charleston Southern	L 50–55	16–7 (7–2)	Joan Perry Brock Center (1,343); Farmville, VA
February 8, 2025; 2:00 p.m., ESPN+		at Radford	L 67–80	16–8 (7–3)	Dedmon Center (879); Radford, VA
February 12, 2025; 7:00 p.m., ESPN+		High Point	L 61–70	16–9 (7–4)	Joan Perry Brock Center (978); Farmville, VA
February 15, 2025; 2:00 p.m., ESPN+		at Presbyterian	W 71-60	17-9 (8-4)	Templeton Center (307); Clinton, SC
February 19, 2025; 7:00 p.m., ESPN+		at Gardner–Webb	W 75-46	18-9 (9-4)	Paul Porter Arena (750); Boiling Springs, NC
February 22, 2025; 6:00 p.m., ESPN+		UNC Asheville	W 67-59	19-9 (10-4)	Joan Perry Brock Center (1,179); Farmville, VA
February 26, 2025; 5:30 p.m., ESPN+		at Winthrop	W 59-55	20-9 (11-4)	Winthrop Coliseum (402); Rock Hill, SC
March 1, 2025; 2:00 p.m., ESPN+		USC Upstate	L 60-62 ^{OT}	20-10 (11-5)	Joan Perry Brock Center (1,387); Farmville, VA
Big South tournament
March 6, 2025; 6:00 pm, ESPN+	(2)	vs. (7) USC Upstate; Quarterfinals	W 56–37	21–10	Freedom Hall Civic Center (1); Johnson City, TN
March 8, 2025; 8:30 pm, ESPN+	(2)	vs. (3) Radford; Semifinals	W 73–65	22–10	Freedom Hall Civic Center (1,158); Johnson City, TN
March 9, 2025; 6:00 pm, ESPN2	(2)	vs. (1) High Point; Championship	L 53–59	22–11	Freedom Hall Civic Center; Johnson City, TN
WNIT
March 20, 2025*; 6:00 p.m., ESPN+		at Duquesne; Round 1	L 68–70	22–12	UPMC Cooper Fieldhouse (1,119); Pittsburgh, PA
*Non-conference game. ^{#}Rankings from AP poll. (#) Tournament seedings in parentheses. All times are in Eastern.
