= 2024–25 Presbyterian Blue Hose women's basketball team =

American college basketball season

2024–25 Presbyterian Blue Hose women's basketball
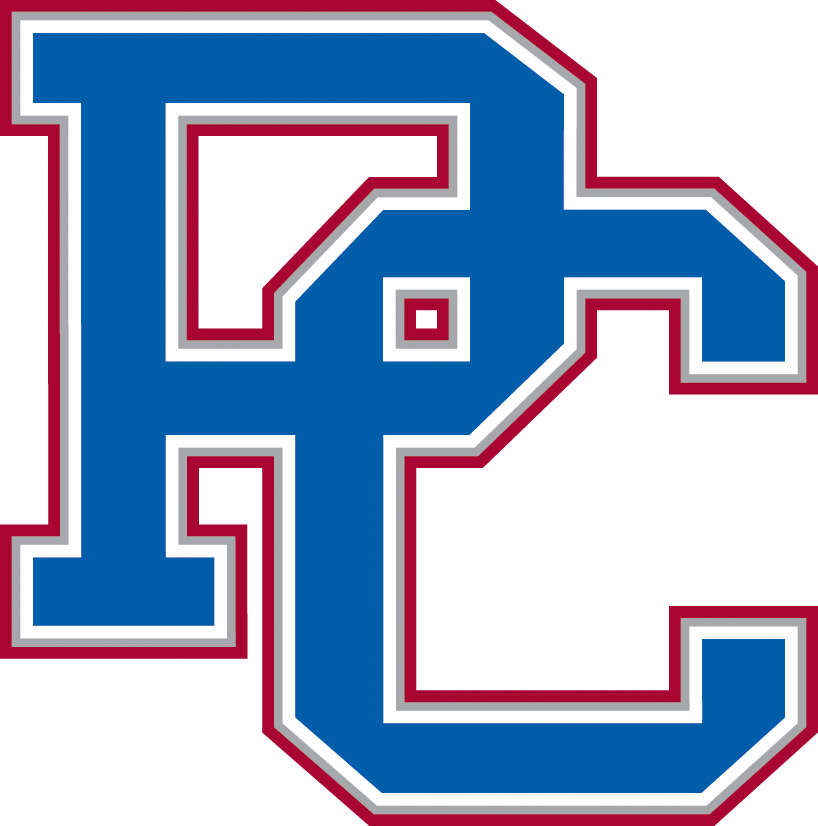
- Conference: Big South Conference
- Record: 6–22 (4–11 Big South)
- Head coach: Tiffany Sardin (1st season)
- Assistant coaches: Ivey Slaughter; Elyse Kiploks; Nicholas Boboshko
- Home arena: Templeton Center

2024–25 Big South women's basketball standings
	Conf.				Overall
Team	W		L	PCT	W		L	PCT
High Point †	13	–	3	.813	21	–	12	.636
Longwood	11	–	5	.688	22	–	12	.647
Radford	10	–	6	.625	14	–	17	.452
Charleston Southern	10	–	6	.625	14	–	16	.467
Winthrop	9	–	7	.563	16	–	15	.516
Gardner–Webb	8	–	8	.500	11	–	18	.379
USC Upstate	6	–	10	.375	9	–	21	.300
Presbyterian	4	–	12	.250	6	–	24	.200
UNC Asheville	1	–	15	.063	4	–	27	.129
† 2025 Big South tournament winner

The 2024–25 Presbyterian Blue Hose women's basketball team represented Presbyterian College during the 2024–25 NCAA Division I women's basketball season. The Blue Hose, led by first-year head coach Tiffany Sardin, played their home games at the Templeton Center in Clinton, South Carolina as members of the Big South Conference.

== Previous season ==
The Blue Hose finished the 2023–24 season 21–15, 8–8 in Big South play, to finish in a three-way tie for fourth place. They would defeat Charleston Southern, upset top-seeded High Point, and Radford to win their first-ever Big South tournament championship, and in turn, their first ever NCAA tournament appearance. They received the #16 seed in the Albany Regional 1, where they would defeat Sacred Heart in the First Four, before falling to eventual undefeated national champions South Carolina in the first round.

On April 5, 2024, it was announced that head coach Alaura Sharp would be leaving the program after six years, in order to take the head coaching position at Appalachian State. On April 19, the school announced that they would be hiring former Saint Louis assistant coach Tiffany Sardin as their new head coach.

== Roster ==
2024–25 Presbyterian Blue Hose women's basketball team
Players
Coaches

Pos.	#	Name	Height	Year	Previous school	Hometown
F	00	Dennaye Hinds	6 ft 1 in (1.85 m)	Jr	St. Joseph High School	Bridgeport, Connecticut
G	1	Natalie Herrin	5 ft 8 in (1.73 m)	Jr	Pierce County High School	Patterson, Georgia
G	2	Shelby Fiddler	5 ft 9 in (1.75 m)	Jr	Niagara	Roanoke, Virginia
G	3	Ashley Carrillo	5 ft 7 in (1.7 m)	Jr	Liberal High School	Liberal, Kansas
F	4	Teresa Mbemba	5 ft 11 in (1.8 m)	Jr	Frank Phillips College	Benguela, Angola
G	5	Morgan Boyd	5 ft 9 in (1.75 m)	Fr	Highland Springs High School	Highland Springs, Virginia
G	10	Aminata Tal	5 ft 8 in (1.73 m)	Jr	Shorter College	Saint-Louis, Senegal
F	11	Sonia Sato	6 ft 0 in (1.83 m)	Sr	McCook Community College	El Paso, Texas
G	15	Paige Kindseth	5 ft 9 in (1.75 m)	Sr	Farmington High School	Farmington, Minnesota
G	20	Ellie Southards	5 ft 8 in (1.73 m)	Fr	Rabun County High School	Tiger, Georgia
F	23	Laney Scoggins	5 ft 11 in (1.8 m)	So	Hoggard High School	Leland, North Carolina
G/F	24	Kishyah Anderson	5 ft 10 in (1.78 m)	Jr	Yavapai College	Gilbert, Arizona
F	30	Adout Ring	6 ft 2 in (1.88 m)	Jr	Santa Fe College	Sydney, Australia
G	33	Daniella Velez	5 ft 5 in (1.65 m)	Fr	Monsignor McClancy Memorial High School	Queens, New York

Head coach

- Tiffany Sardin (Virginia)

Assistant coach(es)

- Ivey Slaughter (Florida State)
- Elyse Kiploks (Charleston Southern)
- Nicholas Boboshko (Towson)

Legend

- (C) Team captain
- (S) Suspended
- (I) Ineligible
- (W) Walk-on
- Injured
- Current redshirt

Roster
Last update: January 19, 2025

== Schedule and results ==
Date time, TV	Rank^{#}	Opponent^{#}	Result	Record	Site (attendance) city, state
Non-conference regular season
November 4, 2024*; 5:30 pm, ESPN+		at Charlotte	L 63–77	0–1	Dale F. Halton Arena; Charlotte, NC
November 8, 2024*; 6:30 pm		at South Carolina State	L 54–59	0–2	SHM Memorial Center; Orangeburg, SC
November 11, 2024*; 11:00 am, ACCNX		at Clemson	L 33–81	0–3	Littlejohn Coliseum (6,589); Clemson, SC
November 14, 2024*; 11:00 am, ESPN+		UNC Wilmington	L 74–78 ^{OT}	0–4	Templeton Center (880); Clinton, SC
November 22, 2024*; 6:30 pm, ESPN+		Western Carolina	L 41–71	0–5	Templeton Center (329); Clinton, SC
November 24, 2024*; 6:00 pm, ESPN+		at Davidson	L 39–81	0–6	John M. Belk Arena; Davidson, NC
November 27, 2024*; 7:00 pm, ESPN+		at East Tennessee State	L 31–64	0–7	Brooks Gymnasium (316); Johnson City, TN
December 2, 2024*; 6:30 pm, ESPN+		Queens	L 47–60	0–8	Templeton Center (275); Clinton, SC
December 11, 2024*; 11:00 am, ESPN+		at North Carolina Central	W 67–63	1–8	McDougald–McLendon Arena (75); Durham, NC
December 15, 2024*; 2:00 pm, ESPN+		Coastal Carolina	L 46–73	1–9	Templeton Center (368); Clinton, SC
December 18, 2024*; 10:30 am		vs. Morgan State; Puerto Rico Clasico	L 41–54	1–10	Coliseo Rubén Rodríguez (100); Bayamón, PR
December 19, 2024*; 10:30 am		vs. Montana State; Puerto Rico Clasico	L 40–57	1–11	Coliseo Rubén Rodríguez (100); Bayamón, PR
December 31, 2024*; 12:00 pm, ESPN+		Newberry	W 63–43	2–11	Templeton Center (311); Clinton, SC
Big South regular season
January 2, 2025; 2:00 pm, ESPN+		at Longwood	L 56–68	2–12 (0–1)	Joan Perry Brock Center (972); Farmville, VA
January 4, 2025; 2:00 pm, ESPN+		Gardner–Webb	L 58–62	2–13 (0–2)	Templeton Center (263); Clinton, SC
January 8, 2025; 6:30 pm, ESPN+		USC Upstate	W 59–58	3–13 (1–2)	Templeton Center (642); Clinton, SC
January 11, 2025; 2:00 pm, ESPN+		at UNC Asheville	W 60–56	4–13 (2–2)	Kimmel Arena (184); Asheville, NC
January 18, 2025; 2:00 pm, ESPN+		High Point	L 47–75	4–14 (2–3)	Templeton Center (345); Clinton, SC
January 22, 2025; 6:00 pm, ESPN+		at Charleston Southern	L 58-71	4-15 (2-4)	Buccaneer Field House (302); North Charleston, SC
January 25, 2025; 2:00 pm, ESPN+		Radford	L 50-62	4-16 (2-5)	Templeton Center (416); Clinton, SC
January 29, 2025; 6:30 pm, ESPN+		Winthrop	L 58-67 ^{OT}	4-17 (2-6)	Templeton Center (449); Clinton, SC
February 1, 2025; 7:00 pm, ESPN+		at High Point	L 43-62	4-18 (2-7)	Qubein Center (721); High Point, NC
February 5, 2025; 7:00 pm, ESPN+		at USC Upstate	W 68-51	5-18 (3-7)	G. B. Hodge Center (302); Spartanburg, SC
February 12, 2025; 6:30 pm, ESPN+		Charleston Southern	L 65-79	5-19 (3-8)	Templeton Center (612); Clinton, SC
February 15, 2025; 2:00 pm, ESPN+		Longwood	L 60-71	5-20 (3-9)	Templeton Center (307); Clinton, SC
February 19, 2025; 6:00 pm, ESPN+		at Winthrop	L 55-60	5-21 (3-10)	Winthrop Coliseum (357); Rock Hill, SC
February 22, 2025; 2:00 pm, ESPN+		at Radford	W 78-71	6-21 (4-10)	Dedmon Center (907); Radford, VA
February 26, 2025; 6:30 pm, ESPN+		UNC Asheville	L 60-67	6-22 (4-11)	Templeton Center (351); Clinton, SC
March 1, 2025; 1:00 pm, ESPN+		at Gardner–Webb	L 81-91	6-23 (4-12)	Paul Porter Arena (378); Boiling Springs, NC
Big South tournament
March 5, 2025; 5:00 pm, ESPN+	(8)	vs. (9) UNC Asheville; Opening Round			Freedom Hall Civic Center; Johnson City, TN
*Non-conference game. ^{#}Rankings from AP Poll. (#) Tournament seedings in parentheses. All times are in Eastern.
