= 2024–25 Winthrop Eagles women's basketball team =

American college basketball season

2024–25 Winthrop Eagles women's basketball
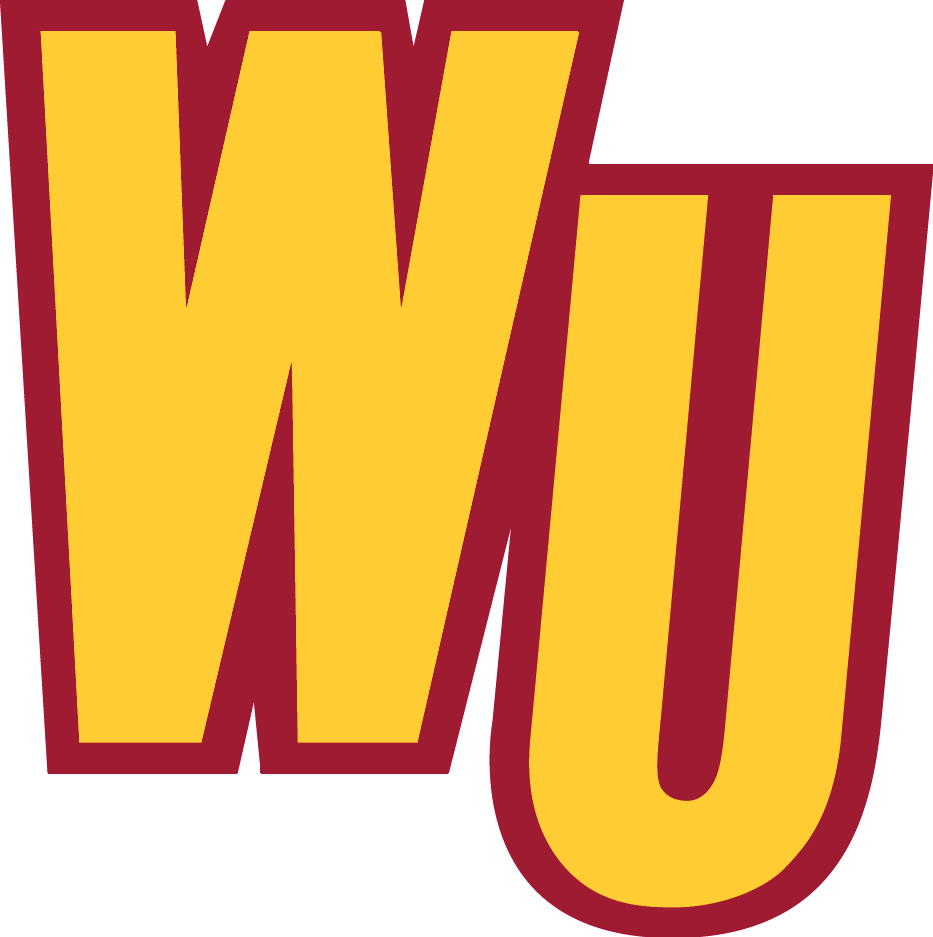
- Conference: Big South Conference
- Record: 16–15 (9–7 Big South)
- Head coach: Semeka Randall Lay (5th season)
- Associate head coach: AnnMarie Gilbert
- Assistant coaches: Dante Travis; Necole Sterling; Dominique Duck
- Home arena: Winthrop Coliseum

2024–25 Big South women's basketball standings
| | Conf. | | | | Overall |
| Team | W | | L | PCT | W | | L | PCT |
|---|---|---|---|---|---|---|---|---|
| High Point † | 13 | – | 3 | .813 | 21 | – | 12 | .636 |
| Longwood | 11 | – | 5 | .688 | 22 | – | 12 | .647 |
| Radford | 10 | – | 6 | .625 | 14 | – | 17 | .452 |
| Charleston Southern | 10 | – | 6 | .625 | 14 | – | 16 | .467 |
| Winthrop | 9 | – | 7 | .563 | 16 | – | 15 | .516 |
| Gardner–Webb | 8 | – | 8 | .500 | 11 | – | 18 | .379 |
| USC Upstate | 6 | – | 10 | .375 | 9 | – | 21 | .300 |
| Presbyterian | 4 | – | 12 | .250 | 6 | – | 24 | .200 |
| UNC Asheville | 1 | – | 15 | .063 | 4 | – | 27 | .129 |
† 2025 Big South tournament winner

The 2024–25 Winthrop Eagles women's basketball team represented Winthrop University during the 2024–25 NCAA Division I women's basketball season. The Eagles, led by fifth-year head coach Semeka Randall Lay, played their home games at the Winthrop Coliseum in Rock Hill, South Carolina as members of the Big South Conference.

== Previous season ==
The Eagles finished the 2023–24 season 14–15, 8–8 in Big South play, to finish in a three-way tie for fourth place. They would be defeated by Radford in the quarterfinals of the Big South tournament.

== Roster ==
2024–25 Winthrop Eagles women's basketball team
Players
Coaches

| Pos. | # | Name | Height | Year | Previous school | Hometown |
|---|---|---|---|---|---|---|
| G | 0 | Ar'Mani Reid | 5 ft 9 in (1.75 m) | So | Southwest Onslow High School | Jacksonville, NC |
| G | 1 | Olivia Wagner | 5 ft 7 in (1.7 m) | Jr | Radford | Crozet, VA |
| G/F | 3 | Ronaltha Marc | 5 ft 10 in (1.78 m) | Sr | Northwest Florida State College | Miami, FL |
| F | 4 | Marissa Gasaway | 5 ft 11 in (1.8 m) | Sr | Northwest Florida State College | Louisville, KY |
| C | 5 | Prunelle Mungo | 6 ft 2 in (1.88 m) | Sr | Oakland | Philadelphia, PA |
| G | 7 | Ciara Harris | 5 ft 8 in (1.73 m) | GS | Johnson C. Smith | Alexandria, VA |
| G | 10 | Jada Ryce | 5 ft 5 in (1.65 m) | Sr | East Tennessee State | McDonough, GA |
| F | 11 | Blessing Okoh | 6 ft 0 in (1.83 m) | Sr | North Carolina Central | Houston, TX |
| PG | 12 | Leonor Paisana | 5 ft 7 in (1.7 m) | Sr | Escola Secundaria Antonio Damasio | Lisbon, Portugal |
| G | 13 | Mya Pierfax | 5 ft 9 in (1.75 m) | Jr | Northwest Florida State College | Lake Elsinore, CA |
| G/F | 15 | Amourie Porter | 5 ft 10 in (1.78 m) | So | Cal State Bakersfield | Glen Burnie, MD |
| G/F | 21 | Persais Williams | 5 ft 9 in (1.75 m) | Fr | Champaign Central High School | Bolingbrook, IL |
| F | 22 | Nuria Cunill | 6 ft 1 in (1.85 m) | Sr | Presbyterian | Berga, Spain |
| G | 25 | Konnor Gambrell | 6 ft 1 in (1.85 m) | GS | Trevecca Nazarene | Alexandria, VA |
| G | 30 | Adelaide McLeod | 5 ft 9 in (1.75 m) | So | Champaign Central High School | Savoy, IL |
| F | 34 | Bria Beverly | 5 ft 11 in (1.8 m) | Jr | Radford | Dallastown, PA |

Head coach

- Semeka Randall Lay (Tennessee)

Assistant coach(es)

- AnnMarie Gilbert (Oberlin)
- Dante Travis (Saint Paul's)
- Necole Sterling (Miami (FL))
- Dominique Duck (Western Kentucky)

Legend

- (C) Team captain
- (S) Suspended
- (I) Ineligible
- (W) Walk-on
- Injured
- Current redshirt

Roster
Last update: January 16, 2025

== Schedule and results ==
| Date time, TV | Rank^{#} | Opponent^{#} | Result | Record | Site (attendance) city, state |
Non-conference regular season
| November 4, 2024*; 10:30 a.m., ACCNX | | at Georgia Tech | L 39–85 | 0–1 | McCamish Pavilion (3,611); Atlanta, GA |
| November 10, 2024*; 2:00 p.m., ESPN+ | | Paine | W 111–32 | 1–1 | Winthrop Coliseum (401); Rock Hill, SC |
| November 13, 2024*; 12:00 p.m., ESPN+ | | at Queens | W 69–52 | 2–1 | Curry Arena (948); Charlotte, NC |
| November 17, 2024*; 2:00 p.m., ACCNX | | at Wake Forest | L 50–66 | 2–2 | LJVM Coliseum (897); Winston-Salem, NC |
| November 20, 2024*; 7:00 p.m., FloHoops | | at UNC Wilmington | L 48–66 | 2–3 | Trask Coliseum (739); Wilmington, NC |
| November 23, 2024*; 2:00 p.m., ESPN+ | | North Florida | W 71–61 | 3–3 | Winthrop Coliseum (360); Rock Hill, SC |
| November 26, 2024*; 11:00 a.m., ESPN+ | | Johnson & Wales (NC) | W 96–39 | 4–3 | Winthrop Coliseum (2,211); Rock Hill, SC |
| November 29, 2024*; 6:30 p.m. | | vs. American; Puerto Rico Clasico | W 74–66 | 5–3 | Coliseo Rubén Rodríguez (100); Bayamón, Puerto Rico |
| November 30, 2024*; 4:30 p.m. | | vs. Air Force; Puerto Rico Clasico | L 47–62 | 5–4 | Juan Cruz Abreu Coliseum (100); Manatí, Puerto Rico |
| December 11, 2024*; 6:00 p.m., ESPN+ | | South Carolina State | W 55–46 | 6–4 | Rock Hill Sports & Event Center (268); Rock Hill, SC |
| December 16, 2024*; 11:00 a.m., ESPN+ | | at Charlotte | L 47–55 | 6–5 | Dale F. Halton Arena (2,055); Charlotte, NC |
| December 20, 2024*; 12:00 p.m., ESPN+ | | North Carolina Central | L 71–76 | 6–6 | Winthrop Coliseum (409); Rock Hill, SC |
| December 29, 2024*; 2:00 p.m., SECN+ | | at No. 15 Tennessee | L 50–114 | 6–7 | Thompson–Boling Arena (11,152); Knoxville, TN |
Big South regular season
| January 2, 2025; 7:00 p.m., ESPN+ | | at USC Upstate | W 63–54 | 7–7 (1–0) | G. B. Hodge Center (112); Spartanburg, SC |
| January 4, 2025; 2:00 p.m., ESPN+ | | Radford | W 65–58 | 8–7 (2–0) | Winthrop Coliseum (490); Rock Hill, SC |
| January 8, 2025; 6:00 p.m., ESPN+ | | Gardner–Webb | W 63–49 | 9–7 (3–0) | Winthrop Coliseum (334); Rock Hill, SC |
| January 11, 2025; 6:00 p.m., ESPN+ | | at Longwood | L 59–77 | 9–8 (3–1) | Joan Perry Brock Center (923); Farmville, VA |
| January 15, 2025; 6:00 p.m., ESPN+ | | at Charleston Southern | L 50–78 | 9–9 (3–2) | Buccaneer Field House (586); North Charleston, SC |
| January 18, 2025; 2:00 p.m., ESPN+ | | UNC Asheville | W 63–43 | 10–9 (4–2) | Winthrop Coliseum (491); Rock Hill, SC |
| January 25, 2025; 2:00 p.m., ESPN+ | | High Point | L 55-73 | 10-10 (4-3) | Winthrop Coliseum (339); Rock Hill, SC |
| January 29, 2025; 6:30 p.m., ESPN+ | | at Presbyterian | W 67-58 ^{OT} | 11-10 (5-3) | Templeton Center (449); Clinton, SC |
| February 1, 2025; 1:00 p.m., ESPN+ | | at Gardner–Webb | L 54-66 | 11-11 (5-4) | Paul Porter Arena (300); Boiling Springs, NC |
| February 5, 2025; 6:00 p.m., ESPN+ | | Charleston Southern | W 54-47 | 12-11 (6-4) | Winthrop Coliseum (387); Rock Hill, SC |
| February 8, 2025; 2:00 p.m., ESPN+ | | USC Upstate | L 48-52 | 12-12 (6-5) | Winthrop Coliseum (340); Rock Hill, SC |
| February 12, 2025; 7:00 p.m., ESPN+ | | at Radford | W 78-68 | 13-12 (7-5) | Dedmon Center (676); Radford, VA |
| February 15, 2025; 7:00 p.m., ESPN+ | | at High Point | L 56-69 | 13-13 (7-6) | Qubein Center (684); High Point, NC |
| February 19, 2025; 6:00 p.m., ESPN+ | | Presbyterian | W 60-55 | 14-13 (8-6) | Winthrop Coliseum (357); Rock Hill, SC |
| February 26, 2025; 5:30 p.m., ESPN+ | | Longwood | L 55-59 | 14-14 (8-7) | Winthrop Coliseum (402); Rock Hill, SC |
| March 1, 2025; 2:00 p.m., ESPN+ | | at UNC Asheville | W 71-66 | 15-14 (9-7) | Kimmel Arena (483); Asheville, NC |
Big South tournament
| March 6, 2025; 2:00 pm, ESPN+ | (5) | vs. (4) Charleston Southern; Quarterfinals | | | Freedom Hall Civic Center; Johnson City, TN |
*Non-conference game. ^{#}Rankings from AP poll. (#) Tournament seedings in parentheses. All times are in Eastern.
