= Clarisse Garcia =

American basketball coach

Biographical details
- Born: December 18, 1984 (age 41); Wheat Ridge, Colorado

Playing career
- 2003–2007: Villanova
- Position: Guard

Coaching career (HC unless noted)
- 2007–2009: Seton Hill (GA)
- 2009–2010: Stetson (assistant)
- 2010–2012: Palm Beach Atlantic
- 2012–2013: Alabama (assistant)
- 2013–2016: Wake Forest (assistant)
- 2016–2021: Auburn (assistant)
- 2021–2026: Charleston Southern

Head coaching record
- Overall: 55–148 (.271)

Clarisse Garcia (born December 18, 1984) is an American basketball coach who recently was the head coach of the women's basketball team at Charleston Southern University.

== Playing career ==
Garcia played basketball at Villanova from 2003 to 2007, where she was a walk-on player. During her time at Villanova, she was a three-time member of the dean's list, as well as a three-time Big East All-Academic member.

== Coaching career ==
Garcia began her coaching career as a graduate assistant at Seton Hill University in Pennsylvania, before moving on to Stetson in 2009 as an assistant coach.

Garcia was named the head coach at Palm Beach Atlantic University, a Division II school in Florida in May 2010. She compiled a 15–39 record in two seasons before she stepped down to take an assistant coaching position at Alabama in 2012. She spent one season at Alabama before joining Wake Forest as an assistant. She was also an assistant coach at Auburn from 2016 to 2021.

Garcia was named the head coach at Charleston Southern on May 3, 2021.

== Head coaching record ==
- Charleston Southern
- Big South

Statistics overview
Season	Team	Overall	Conference	Standing	Postseason
Palm Beach Atlantic Sailfish (2010–2012)
2010–11	Palm Beach Atlantic	8–20			
2011–12	Palm Beach Atlantic	7–19			
Palm Beach Atlantic:		15–39 (.278)			
Charleston Southern Buccaneers (Big South Conference) (2021–2026)
2021–22	Charleston Southern	2–27	2–15	12th	
2022–23	Charleston Southern	5–25	3–15	10th	
2023–24	Charleston Southern	11–19	8–8	T–4th	
2024–25	Charleston Southern	14–16	10–6	T–3rd	
2025–26	Charleston Southern	8–22	6–10	T–7th	
Charleston Southern:		40–109 (.268)	29–54 (.349)		
Total:		55–148 (.271)			
National champion Postseason invitational champion Conference regular season champion Conference regular season and conference tournament champion Division regular season champion Division regular season and conference tournament champion Conference tournament champion
