= 2024–25 Atlantic Coast Conference women's basketball season =

- League: NCAA Division I
- Sport: Basketball
- Duration: November 4, 2024 – March 2, 2024
- Teams: 18
- TV partner(s): ACC Network, ESPN

WNBA Draft
- Top draft pick: Sonia Citron, Notre Dame
- Picked by: Washington Mystics, 3rd overall

2024–25 NCAA Division I women's basketball season
- League champions: NC State; Notre Dame
- Runners-up: Duke
- Season MVP: Hannah Hidalgo, Notre Dame
- Top scorer: Ta'Niya Latson, Florida State – 25.38 ppg

ACC Tournament
- Champions: Duke
- Finals MVP: Oluchi Okananwa, Duke

Atlantic Coast Conference women's basketball seasons
- ← 2023–24 2025–26 →

2024–25 ACC women's basketball standings
	Conf.				Overall
Team	W		L	PCT	W		L	PCT
No. 9 NC State	16	–	2	.889	28	–	7	.800
No. 8 Notre Dame	16	–	2	.889	28	–	6	.824
No. 7 Duke †	14	–	4	.778	29	–	8	.784
No. 22 Florida State	13	–	5	.722	24	–	9	.727
No. 12 North Carolina	13	–	5	.722	29	–	8	.784
Louisville	13	–	5	.722	22	–	11	.667
California	12	–	6	.667	25	–	9	.735
Virginia Tech	9	–	9	.500	19	–	13	.594
Georgia Tech	9	–	9	.500	22	–	11	.667
Virginia	8	–	10	.444	17	–	15	.531
Stanford	8	–	10	.444	16	–	15	.516
Boston College	6	–	12	.333	16	–	18	.471
Syracuse	6	–	12	.333	12	–	18	.400
Clemson	6	–	12	.333	14	–	17	.452
Pittsburgh	5	–	13	.278	13	–	19	.406
Miami (FL)	4	–	14	.222	14	–	15	.483
Wake Forest	2	–	16	.111	9	–	20	.310
SMU	2	–	16	.111	10	–	20	.333
† 2025 ACC tournament winner Rankings from AP Poll

The 2024–25 Atlantic Coast Conference women's basketball season began with practices in October 2024, followed by the start of the 2024–25 NCAA Division I women's basketball season in November. Conference play started in December 2024 and ended on March 3, 2025. After the regular season, the 2025 ACC women's basketball tournament was held at the Greensboro Coliseum in Greensboro, NC for the 25th time in 26 years (since 1998). This was the first season where eighteen teams competed in the conference, following the additions of California, SMU, and Stanford on July 1, 2024.

NC State and Notre Dame finished as co-regular season champions with 16–2 conference records. Third-seed Duke won the 2025 ACC women's basketball tournament over NC State. Eleven teams from the league qualified for a post-season tournament, with three teams being invited to the WBIT and eight teams qualifying for the NCAA Tournament. No team made it past the Second Round of the WBIT, while Duke was the best performing team in the NCAA tournament, losing in the Elite Eight.

== Head coaches ==
=== Coaching changes ===
- On March 12, 2024, Amanda Butler was fired as Clemson's head coach after six years since 2018. Shawn Poppie was hired replacing her on April 8, 2024
- On March 22, 2024, Katie Meier announced her retirement after nineteen years (since 2005) as head coach of Miami. Tricia Cullop was announced as her replacement on April 4, 2024.
- On March 26, 2024, Kenny Brooks announced he was stepping down as the head coach of Virginia Tech after eight seasons to become the new Kentucky head coach. On April 3, 2024, Megan Duffy was announced as his replacement.
- On April 9, 2024, Tara VanDerveer announced her retirement after thirty eight seasons as the head coach of Stanford. Longtime assistant and former Cardinal player Kate Paye was announced as her replacement on April 16, 2024.

=== Coaches ===
Team	Head coach	Previous job	Years at school	Record at school	ACC record	ACC titles	NCAA tournaments	NCAA Final Fours	NCAA Championships
Boston College	Joanna Bernabei-McNamee	Albany	7	92–88	36–65	0	0	0	0
California	Charmin Smith	New York Liberty (assistant)	6	56–80	0–0	0	0	0	0
Clemson	Shawn Poppie	Chattanooga	1	0–0	0–0	0	0	0	0
Duke	Kara Lawson	Boston Celtics (Assistant)	5	68–33	32–23	0	2	0	0
Florida State	Brooke Wyckoff	Florida State (Assistant)	4	56–30	33–19	0	3	0	0
Georgia Tech	Nell Fortner	Auburn	6	88–64	44–46	0	2	0	0
Louisville	Jeff Walz	Maryland (Assistant)	18	464–135	214–68	1	9	4	0
Miami	Tricia Cullop	Toledo	1	0–0	0–0	0	0	0	0
NC State	Wes Moore	Chattanooga	12	273–88	129–54	3	8	1	0
North Carolina	Courtney Banghart	Princeton	6	96–56	50–39	0	4	0	0
Notre Dame	Niele Ivey	Memphis Grizzlies (Assistant)	5	89–32	49–20	1	3	0	0
Pittsburgh	Tory Verdi	UMass	2	8–24	2–16	0	0	0	0
SMU	Toyelle Wilson	Michigan (assistant)	4	45–43	0–0	0	0	0	0
Stanford	Kate Paye	Stanford (associate head coach)	1	0–0	0–0	0	0	0	0
Syracuse	Felisha Legette-Jack	Buffalo	3	44–21	13–5	0	1	0	0
Virginia	Amaka Agugua-Hamilton	Missouri State	3	31–31	11–25	0	0	0	0
Virginia Tech	Megan Duffy	Marquette	1	0–0	0–0	0	0	0	0
Wake Forest	Megan Gebbia	American	3	24–42	7–29	0	0	0	0

Notes:

- Year at school includes 2024–25 season.
- Overall and ACC records are from time at current school and are through the end the 2023–24 season.
- NCAA tournament appearances are from time at current school only.
- NCAA Final Fours and Championship include time at other schools

== Preseason ==
=== Preseason watch lists ===
Below is a table of notable preseason watch lists.

**Wooden Award**	**Lieberman**	**Drysdale**	**Miller**	**McClain**	**Leslie**	**Naismith**
Haley Cavinder – Miami (FL); Sonia Citron – Notre Dame; Hannah Hidalgo – Notre Dame; Aziaha James – NC State; Ta'Niya Latson – Florida State; Olivia Miles – Notre Dame; Reigan Richardson – Duke; Saniya Rivers – NC State; Alyssa Ustby – North Carolina; Maddy Westbeld – Notre Dame	Hannah Hidalgo – Notre Dame; Taina Mair – Duke; Olivia Miles – Notre Dame	Sonia Citron – Notre Dame; Jayda Curry – Louisville; Ta'Niya Latson – Florida State; Saniya Rivers – NC State	Andrea Daley – Boston College; Madison Hayes – NC State; Alyssa Ustby – North Carolina	Olivia Cochran – Louisville; Liza Karlen – Notre Dame; Liatu King – Notre Dame; Makayla Timpson – Florida State; Maddy Westbeld – Notre Dame	Maria Gakdeng – North Carolina; Nyla Harris – Louisville; Kennedi Jackson – Boston College	Sonia Citron – Notre Dame; Hannah Hidalgo – Notre Dame; Aziaha James – NC State; Ta'Niya Latson – Florida State; Olivia Miles – Notre Dame; Reigan Richardson – Duke; Saniya Rivers – NC State; Makayla Timpson – Florida State; Alyssa Ustby – North Carolina

=== ACC Women's Basketball Tip-off ===
The preseason poll and Preseason All-ACC Teams were released on October 15, 2024, before the season began and following ACC Media Day. The results of the poll are below.

==== ACC Preseason poll ====
	Team	Points
1	Notre Dame	1,726 (70)
2	NC State	1,617 (8)
3	Duke	1,446
4	Louisville	1,370
5	Florida State	1,335
6	North Carolina	1,279
7	Stanford	1,214 (1)
8	Miami	883
9	Virginia	877
10	Georgia Tech	855
11	Syracuse	801
12	Virginia Tech	786
13	Clemson	553
14	California	546
15	Boston College	533
16	SMU	274
17	Wake Forest	259
18	Pittsburgh	233
Reference: (#) first-place votes

==== Preseason All-ACC Team ====
Player	Class	School	Points
**Hannah Hidalgo**	Sophomore	Notre Dame	921 (62)
Ta'Niya Latson	Junior	Florida State	734 (9)
Saniya Rivers	Senior	NC State	527 (2)
Aziaha James	Senior	NC State	473 (1)
Olivia Miles	Junior	Notre Dame	457 (4)
Sonia Citron	Junior	Notre Dame	331
Makayla Timpson	Senior	Florida State	315
Alyssa Ustby	Graduate Student	North Carolina	308
Reigan Richardson	Senior	Duke	202
Kymora Johnson	Sophomore	Virginia	193 (1)

ACC Preseason Player of the Year shown in Bold.
First-place votes shown in parentheses.

==== Newcomer Watchlist ====
Position	Player	School	Votes
F	Toby Fournier	Duke	222
G	Imari Berry	Louisville	180
F	Kate Koval	Notre Dame	177
G	Zamareya Jones	NC State	116
F	Liza Karlen	Notre Dame	109

== Regular season ==
=== Records against other conferences ===
2024–25 records against non-conference foes. Records shown for regular season only.
Updated through games played on December 22, 2024

Power 4 Conferences	Record
Big East	3–5
Big Ten	6–10
Big 12	5–6
SEC	13–18
Power 4 Conferences Total	27–40
Other NCAA Division 1 Conferences	Record
America East	6–1
American	9–1
A-10	6–3
ASUN	7–0
Big Sky	1–0
Big South	10–0
Big West	4–0
CAA	10–0
C-USA	3–0
Division 1 Independents	0–0
Horizon	2–0
Ivy League	3–1
MAAC	5–1
MAC	5–0
MEAC	10–0
MVC	1–1
Mountain West	2–1
NEC	5–0
OVC	4–0
Patriot League	5–0
SoCon	6–0
Southland	1–0
SWAC	10–0
Summit League	2–0
Sun Belt	6–1
WAC	2–0
WCC	7–2
Other Division I Total	133–12
NCAA Division I Total	159–52

=== Record against ranked non-conference opponents ===
This is a list of games against ranked opponents only (rankings from the AP Poll):

Date	Visitor	Home	Site	Significance	Score	Conference record
November 4	No. 17 Louisville	No. 5 UCLA†	Adidas Arena • Paris, France	Aflac Oui-Play	L 59–66	0–1
November 8	Virginia	No. 10 Oklahoma	Lloyd Noble Center • Norman, OK		L 51–95	0–2
November 10	No. 9 NC State	No. 1 South Carolina†	Spectrum Center • Charlotte, NC	Ally Tipoff	L 57–71	0–3
November 10	No. 11 Duke	No. 18 Maryland	Xfinity Center • College Park, MD		L 80–85	0–4
November 13	No. 11 Maryland	Syracuse	JMA Wireless Dome • Syracuse, NY		L 73–84	0–5
November 15	No. 2 UConn	No. 14 North Carolina†	Greensboro Coliseum • Greensboro, NC		L 58–69	0–6
November 16	No. 18 Louisville	No. 20 Kentucky	Rupp Arena • Lexington, KY	Rivalry	L 61–71 ^{OT}	0–7
November 20	No. 1 South Carolina	Clemson	Littlejohn Coliseum • Clemson, SC	Rivalry	L 45–77	0–8
November 23	No. 6 Notre Dame	No. 3 USC	Galen Center • Los Angeles, CA		W 74–61	1–8
November 25	Boston College	No. 18 Ole Miss†	Baha Mar Convention Center • Nassau, Bahamas	Baha Mar Championship	L 55–92	1–9
November 25	No. 13 Duke	No. 9 Kansas State†	Lee's Family Forum • Henderson, NV	Ball Dawgs Classic	W 73–62	2–9
November 25	Georgia Tech	No. 21 Oregon†	George Q. Cannon Activities Center • Lāʻie, HI	Hawaii North Shore Showcase	W 74–58	3–9
November 26	Clemson	No. 23 Alabama†	Raider Arena • Niceville, FL	Emerald Coast Classic	L 39–73	3–10
November 27	No. 13 Duke	No. 8 Oklahoma†	Lee's Family Forum • Henderson, NV	Ball Dawgs Classic	W 109–99 ^{OT}	4–10
November 27	No. 20 NC State	No. 7 LSU†	Baha Mar Convention Center • Nassau, Bahamas	Pink Flamingo Championship	L 65–82	4–11
November 29	No. 3 Notre Dame	No. 17 TCU†	John Gray Gymnasium • Georgetown, Cayman Islands	Cayman Islands Classic	L 68–76	4–12
December 4	No. 11 Oklahoma	No. 22 Louisville	KFC Yum! Center • Louisville, KY	ACC–SEC Challenge	L 72–78	4–13
December 5	No. 14 Kentucky	No. 16 North Carolina	Carmichael Arena • Chapel Hill, NC	ACC–SEC Challenge	W 72–53	5–13
December 5	No. 4 Texas	No. 10 Notre Dame	Joyce Center • South Bend, IN	ACC–SEC Challenge	W 70–60 ^{OT}	6–13
December 5	No. 18 Ole Miss	NC State	Reynolds Coliseum • Raleigh, NC	ACC–SEC Challenge	W 68–61	7–13
December 5	No. 19 Alabama	California	Haas Pavilion • Berkeley, CA	ACC–SEC Challenge	W 69–65	8–13
December 5	No. 8 Duke	No. 3 South Carolina	Colonial Life Arena • Columbia, South Carolina	ACC–SEC Challenge	L 70–81	8–14
December 5	Stanford	No. 5 LSU	Pete Maravich Assembly Center • Baton Rouge, LA	ACC–SEC Challenge	L 88–94 ^{OT}	8–15
December 7	No. 22 Louisville	No. 2 UConn†	Barclays Center • Brooklyn, NY		L 52–85	8–16
December 12	No. 2 UConn	No. 8 Notre Dame	Purcell Pavilion • Notre Dame, IN	Rivalry	W 79–68	9–16
December 20	Stanford	No. 11 Ohio State†	Chase Center • San Francisco, CA	Invisalign Bay Area Women's Classic	L 59–84	9–17
December 21	No. 23 Nebraska	No. 17 Georgia Tech	McCamish Pavilion • Atlanta, GA		W 72–61	10–17

Team rankings are reflective of AP poll when the game was played, not current or final ranking

† denotes game was played on neutral site

=== Rankings ===
Legend
Increase in ranking
Decrease in ranking
Not ranked previous week
First Place votes shown in ()

		Pre	Wk 2	Wk 3	Wk 4	Wk 5	Wk 6	Wk 7	Wk 8	Wk 9	Wk 10	Wk 11	Wk 12	Wk 13	Wk 14	Wk 15	Wk 16	Wk 17	Wk 18	Wk 19	Wk 20	Final
Boston College	AP																					
Boston College	C																					
California	AP						RV	24	21	20	24	18	22	19	21	RV	RV	RV	RV	RV	RV	
California	C	RV					RV	RV	24	23	25	18	21	18	21	RV	RV	RV	RV	RV	RV	
Clemson	AP																					
Clemson	C																					
Duke	AP	11	16	14	13	8	9	9	14	14	14	16	14	10	10	13	11	16	11	7	7	7
Duke	C	11	16	14	13	9	10	10	14	15	14	16	14	10	12	10	11	15	11	7	7	7
Florida State	AP	19	RV	RV	RV	RV	RV		RV		RV	RV		25	22	23	RV	24	22	23	22	22
Florida State	C	19	RV	RV	RV	RV	RV	RV	RV	RV	24	RV	RV	24	22	21	25	24	23	24	24	24
Georgia Tech	AP	RV				RV	25	17	13	13	13	17	18	20	17	19	20	RV	RV	RV	RV	
Georgia Tech	C				RV	RV	RV	20	16	14	13	17	18	21	19	19	20	RV				
Louisville	AP	17	18	25	24	22	RV					RV				RV	RV	25	RV	RV	RV	RV
Louisville	C	17	18	22	23	22	RV					RV	RV	RV	RV	RV	RV	RV	RV	RV	RV	RV
Miami	AP	RV	RV	RV	RV																	
Miami	C	RV																				
North Carolina	AP	15	14	16	16	16	14	19	17	17	19	14	13	15	13	12	9	8	14	12	12	14
North Carolina	C	16	15	15	14	15	14	18	17	17	18	14	13	15	13	12	10	9	14	14	14	12
NC State	AP	9	13	20	20	RV	22т	21	22	22	21	21	20	17	14	10	13	9	7	9	9	9
NC State	C	8	10	18	17	24	20	19	20	19	19т	21	20	16	14	11	12	10	8	9	9	10
Notre Dame	AP	6	6	6	3 (3)	10	8	3 (1)	3 (1)	3 (1)	3 (2)	3 (2)	3 (2)	3	3	2	1 (16)	3	6	8	8	10
Notre Dame	C	5	5	5	3 (5)	10	9	4	4	3	3	3	3	3	3	2	1 (23)	4 (1)	6	8	8	9
Pittsburgh	AP																					
Pittsburgh	C																					
SMU	AP																					
SMU	C																					
Stanford	AP	RV	24	RV	RV	RV	RV															
Stanford	C	RV	23	RV	RV	RV	RV															
Syracuse	AP	RV																				
Syracuse	C																					
Virginia	AP																					
Virginia	C																					
Virginia Tech	AP																					
Virginia Tech	C	RV												RV								
Wake Forest	AP																					
Wake Forest	C																					

=== Conference Matrix ===
This table summarizes the head-to-head results between teams in conference play.

	Boston College	California	Clemson	Duke	Florida State	Georgia Tech	Louisville	Miami	North Carolina	NC State	Notre Dame	Pittsburgh	SMU	Stanford	Syracuse	Virginia	Virginia Tech	Wake Forest
vs. Boston College	–	72–63	65–94	86–59	104–80	71–51	86–73	79–83	80–67	91–52	89–63	79–66	78–87	80–75	51–92; 82–57	57–72	89–92^{OT}	69–59
vs. California	63–72	–	69–58	72–38	70–82	65–79	70–63	63–82	65–52	71–78	91–52	53–84	66–81	63–83; 72–75	69–75	70–76	87–84	55–67
vs. Clemson	94–65	58–69	–	74–55	82–67	89–65; 61–68	78–52	61–64	53–51	83–79	67–58	72–59	46–72	61–65^{OT}	67–55	67–60	78–76	59–65
vs. Duke	59–86	38–72	55–74	–	57–71	50–55	70–62	49–90	53–46^{OT}; 53–68	89–83	64–49	31–69	46–81	49–74	49–80	55–60	59–81	47–72
vs. Florida State	80–104	82–70	67–82	71–57	–	70–73	83–69	66–88; 82–83	84–86	97–74	81–86	55–69	85–93	89–84	73–85	68–101	74–105	68–97
vs. Georgia Tech	51–71	79–65	65–89; 68–61	55–50	73–70	–	69–60	66–77	76–82	83–68	81–66	61–100	69–70	87–82	68–85	62–75	105–94^{2OT}	62–73
vs. Louisville	73–86	63–70	52–78	62–70	69–83	60–69	–	56–74	79–75	71–42	89–71; 72–59	56–65	75–80	65–74	62–72	65–68	70–65	76–81^{OT}
vs. Miami	83–79	82–63	64–61	90–49	88–66; 83–82	77–66	74–56	–	69–60	76–74	82–42	56–62	63–70	86–69	66–61	74–77	68–64	60–62
vs. North Carolina	67–80	52–65	51–53	46–53^{OT}; 68–53	86–84	82–76	75–79	60–69	–	65–66	76–66	58–75	33–64	67–69	58–68	78–75	62–67	51–76
vs. NC State	52–91	78–71	79–83	83–89	74–97	68–83	42–72	74–76	66–65	–	95–104^{2OT}	67–83	45–69	67–81	66–74	68–73	57–85	83–90; 57–78
vs. Notre Dame	63–89	52–91	58–67	49–64	86–81	66–81	71–89; 59–72	42–82	66–76	104–95^{2OT}	–	57–88	64–88	47–96	62–93	54–95	61–77	64–100
vs. Pittsburgh	66–79	84–53	59–72	69–31	69–55	100–61	65–56	62–56	75–58	83–67	88–57	–	59–72; 57–58	58–46	83–65	80–67	84–57	53–79
vs. SMU	87–78	81–66	72–46	81–46	93–85	70–69	80–75	70–63	64–33	69–45	88–64	72–59; 58–57	–	63–67	71–72^{OT}	63–51	79–71	67–64
vs. Stanford	75–80	83–63; 75–72	65–61^{OT}	74–49	84–89	82–87	74–65	69–89	69–67	81–67	96–47	46–58	67–63	–	58–79	89–69	74–75^{OT}	71–74
vs. Syracuse	92–51; 57–82	75–69	55–67	80–49	85–73	85–68	72–62	61–66	68–58	74–66	93–62	65–83	72–71^{OT}	79–58	–	70–67	87–93	50–62
vs. Virginia	72–57	76–70	60–67	60–55	101–68	75–62	68–65	77–74	75–78	73–68	95–54	67–80	51–63	69–89	67–70	–	65–73; 87–62	46–69
vs. Virginia Tech	92–89^{OT}	84–87	76–78	81–59	105–74^{2OT}	94–105	65–70	64–68	67–62	85–57	77–61	57–84	71–79	75–74^{OT}	93–87	73–65; 62–87	–	54–61
vs. Wake Forest	59–69	67–55	65–59	72–47	97–68	73–62	81–76^{OT}	62–60	76–51	90–83; 78–57	100–64	79–63	64–67	74–71	62–50	69–46	61–54	–
Total	6–12	12–6	6–12	14–4	13–5	9–9	13–5	4–14	13–5	16–2	16–2	5–13	2–16	8–10	6–12	8–10	9–9	2–16

=== Player of the week ===
Throughout the conference regular season, the Atlantic Coast Conference offices name a Player(s) of the week and a Rookie(s) of the week.

Week	Player of the week	Rookie of the week	Date Awarded	Reference
Week 1	Olivia Miles – Notre Dame	Tajianna Roberts – Louisville	November 11	
Week 2	Hannah Hidalgo – Notre Dame	Dani Carnegie – Georgia Tech	November 18	
Week 2	Makayla Timpson – Florida State	Kate Koval – Notre Dame	November 18	
Week 3	Hannah Hidalgo (2) – Notre Dame	Toby Fournier – Duke	November 25	
Week 4	Ta'Niya Latson – Florida State	Reigan Richardson – Duke	December 2	
Week 5	Ta'Niya Latson (2) – Florida State	Toby Fournier (2) – Duke	December 9	
Week 6	Hannah Hidalgo (3) – Notre Dame	Dani Carnegie (2) – Georgia Tech	December 16	
Week 7	Haley Cavinder – Miami	Dani Carnegie (3) – Georgia Tech	December 23	
Week 8	Olivia Miles (2) – Notre Dame	Dani Carnegie (4) – Georgia Tech	December 30	
Week 9	Ta'Niya Latson (3) – Florida State	Dani Carnegie (5) – Georgia Tech	January 6	
Week 10	Rose Micheaux – Virginia Tech	Tajianna Roberts (2) – Louisville	January 13	
Week 11	Ta'Niya Latson (4) – Florida State	Toby Fournier (3) – Duke	January 20	
Week 12	Ta'Niya Latson (5) – Florida State	Toby Fournier (4) – Duke	January 27	
Week 13	Hannah Hidalgo (4) – Notre Dame	Tajianna Roberts (3) – Louisville	February 3	
Week 14	Aziaha James – NC State	Toby Fournier (5) – Duke	February 10	
Week 15	Reniya Kelly – North Carolina	Tajianna Roberts (4) – Louisville	February 17	
Week 16	Zoe Brooks – NC State	Tilda Trygger – NC State	February 24	
Week 17	Makayla Timpson (2) – Florida State	Toby Fournier (6) – Duke	March 3	

== Postseason ==
=== ACC Tournament ===
- The 2025 Atlantic Coast Conference Basketball Tournament will be held at the First Horizon Coliseum in Greensboro, North Carolina, from March 5-9, 2025.

First round Wednesday, March 5
12	Boston College	76
13	Syracuse	73
10	Virginia	64
15	Pittsburgh	50
11	Stanford	46
14	Clemson	63

Second round Thursday, March 6
8	Virginia Tech	57
9	Georgia Tech	72
5	14 North Carolina	78
12	Boston College	71
7	California	75
10	Virginia	58
6	Louisville	70*
14	Clemson	68

Quarterfinals; Friday, March 7
1	7 NC State	73
9	Georgia Tech	72
4	22 Florida State	56
5	14 North Carolina	60
2	6 Notre Dame	73
7	California	64
3	11 Duke	61
6	Louisville	48

Semifinals; Saturday, March 8
1	7 NC State	66
5	14 North Carolina	55
2	6 Notre Dame	56
3	11 Duke	61

Championship; Sunday, March 9
1	7 NC State	62
3	11 Duke	76

* denotes overtime period

=== NCAA tournament ===
Seed	Region	School	1st Round	2nd Round	Sweet 16	Elite Eight	Final Four	Championship
2	Birmingham 2	Duke	W 86–25 vs. (15) Lehigh (Durham)	W 59–53 vs. (10) Oregon (Durham)	W 47–38 vs. (3) North Carolina (Birmingham)	L 50–54 vs. (1) South Carolina (Birmingham)		
2	Spokane 1	NC State	W 75–55 vs. (15) Vermont (Raleigh)	W 83–49 vs. (7) Michigan State (Raleigh)	L 73–80 vs. (3) LSU (Spokane)			
3	Birmingham 2	North Carolina	W 70–49 vs. (14) Oregon State (Chapel Hill)	W 58–47 vs. (6) West Virginia (Chapel Hill)	L 38–47 vs. (2) Duke (Birmingham)			
3	Birmingham 3	Notre Dame	W 106–54 vs. (14) Stephen F. Austin (Notre Dame)	W 76–55 vs. (6) Michigan (Notre Dame)	L 62–71 vs. (2) TCU (Birmingham)			
6	Spokane 1	Florida State	W 94–59 vs. (11) George Mason (Baton Rouge)	L 71–101 @ (3) LSU (Baton Rouge)				
7	Birmingham 3	Louisville	W 63–52 vs. (10) Nebraska (Fort Worth)	L 70–85 @ (2) TCU (Fort Worth)				
8	Spokane 4	California	L 46–69 vs. (8) Mississippi State (Los Angeles)					
9	Spokane 1	Georgia Tech	L 49–74 vs. (8) Richmond (Los Angeles)					
		W–L (%):	6–2 (.750)	4–2 (.667)	1–3 (.250)	0–1 (.000)	0–0 (–)	0–0 (–)
Total: 11–8 (.579)

=== WBIT tournament ===
Seed	Region	School	1st Round	2nd Round	Quarterfinals	Semifinals	Championship
1	Virginia Tech	Virginia Tech	W 61–45 vs. North Carolina A&T (Blacksburg)	L 59–69 vs. Texas Tech (Blacksburg)			
2	Saint Joseph's	Stanford	L 68–69^{(OT)} vs. Portland (Stanford)				
—	Saint Joseph's	Boston College	L 70–76 @ (4) Villanova (Villanova)				
		W–L (%):	1–2 (.333)	0–1 (.000)	0–0 (–)	0–0 (–)	0–0 (–)
Total: 1–3 (.250)

== Honors and awards ==
=== All-Americans ===
Associated Press	WCBA	USBWA
First Team
Hannah Hidalgo	Hannah Hidalgo	Hannah Hidalgo
Second Team
Ta'Niya Latson; Olivia Miles	None	Ta'Niya Latson; Olivia Miles
Third Team
None	None	None

=== ACC Awards ===
The ACC regular season awards were announced on March 4, 2025, prior to the start of the ACC tournament.

2024-25 ACC Women's Basketball Individual Awards
Award	Recipient(s)
Player of the Year	Hannah Hidalgo – Notre Dame
Coach of the Year	Wes Moore – NC State
Defensive Player of the Year	Hannah Hidalgo – Notre Dame
Freshman of the Year	Toby Fournier – Duke
Sixth Player of the Year	Dani Carnegie – Georgia Tech
Most Improved Player	Zoe Brooks – NC State

2024-25 ACC Women's Basketball All-Conference Teams
First Team	Second Team	Freshman Team
Hannah Hidalgo – Notre Dame; Ta'Niya Latson – Florida State; Olivia Miles – Notre Dame; Aziaha James – NC State; Makayla Timpson – Florida State; Sonia Citron – Notre Dame; Kymora Johnson – Virginia; Saniya Rivers – NC State; Alyssa Ustby – North Carolina; Khadija Faye – Pittsburgh; Zoe Brooks – NC State; Kara Dunn – Georgia Tech; Toby Fournier – Duke; Jayda Curry – Louisville; O'Mariah Gordon – Florida State	Haley Cavinder – Miami; Ioanna Krimili – California; Ashlon Jackson – Duke; Liatu King – Notre Dame; Maria Gakdeng – North Carolina; Tonie Morgan – Georgia Tech; Reniya Kelly – North Carolina; Nunu Agara – Stanford; Tajianna Roberts – Louisville; Nya Robertson – SMU	Toby Fournier – Duke; Tajianna Roberts – Louisville; Dani Carnegie – Georgia Tech; Tilda Trygger – NC State; Lanie Grant – North Carolina; Kate Koval – Notre Dame

2023-24 ACC Women's Basketball All-ACC Defensive Team
Player	Team	Votes
Hannah Hidalgo	Notre Dame	484
Makayla Timpson	Florida State	368
Saniya Rivers	NC State	226
Jadyn Donovan	Duke	161
Alyssa Ustby	North Carolina	123
Sonia Citron	Notre Dame	109

== WNBA draft ==
The ACC had six player selected in the 2025 WNBA draft. Sonia Citron was the first player taken at fourth overall. She was the highest draft pick from the ACC since 2019. She was also the ACC's first player selected in the first round since 2022. This was also the first draft since 2019 where multiple players were selected in the first round.

Player	Team	Round	Pick #	Position	School
Sonia Citron	Washington Mystics	1	4	G	Notre Dame
Saniya Rivers	Connecticut Sun	1	8	G	NC State
Aziaha James	Dallas Wings	1	12	G	NC State
Maddy Westbeld	Chicago Sky	2	16	F	Notre Dame
Makayla Timpson	Indiana Fever	2	19	F	Florida State
Liatu King	Los Angeles Sparks	3	28	F	Notre Dame
