= 2024–25 Syracuse Orange women's basketball team =

Intercollegiate basketball season

2024–25 Syracuse Orange women's basketball
- Conference: Atlantic Coast Conference
- Record: 12–18 (6–12 ACC)
- Head coach: Felisha Legette-Jack (3rd season)
- Associate head coach: Kristen Sharkey (3rd season)
- Assistant coaches: Khyreed Carter (3rd season); Ty Evans (1st season)
- Home arena: JMA Wireless Dome

2024–25 ACC women's basketball standings
	Conf.				Overall
Team	W		L	PCT	W		L	PCT
No. 9 NC State	16	–	2	.889	28	–	7	.800
No. 8 Notre Dame	16	–	2	.889	28	–	6	.824
No. 7 Duke †	14	–	4	.778	29	–	8	.784
No. 22 Florida State	13	–	5	.722	24	–	9	.727
No. 12 North Carolina	13	–	5	.722	29	–	8	.784
Louisville	13	–	5	.722	22	–	11	.667
California	12	–	6	.667	25	–	9	.735
Virginia Tech	9	–	9	.500	19	–	13	.594
Georgia Tech	9	–	9	.500	22	–	11	.667
Virginia	8	–	10	.444	17	–	15	.531
Stanford	8	–	10	.444	16	–	15	.516
Boston College	6	–	12	.333	16	–	18	.471
Syracuse	6	–	12	.333	12	–	18	.400
Clemson	6	–	12	.333	14	–	17	.452
Pittsburgh	5	–	13	.278	13	–	19	.406
Miami (FL)	4	–	14	.222	14	–	15	.483
Wake Forest	2	–	16	.111	9	–	20	.310
SMU	2	–	16	.111	10	–	20	.333
† 2025 ACC tournament winner Rankings from AP Poll

The 2024–25 Syracuse Orange women's basketball team represented Syracuse University during the 2024–25 NCAA Division I women's basketball season. The Orange were led by third-year head coach Felisha Legette-Jack. The Orange were eleventh-year members of the Atlantic Coast Conference and played their home games at the JMA Wireless Dome in Syracuse, New York.

The Orange started the season with a win against Niagara but then lost their next two games, one against Saint Joseph's and the second against eleventh-ranked Maryland. Their struggles continued as they went 3–3 over the next portion of their non-conference schedule. During this stretch, they participated in the Emerald Coast Classic where they defeated Missouri but lost to Creighton. They also lost their ACC–SEC Challenge game against Texas A&M during that run. They lost their ACC opener to tenth ranked Notre Dame 93–62. They won their final two non-conference games in 2024. 2025 started on a difficult note, as the Orange lost their first three games of the calendar year. The losses included thirteenth-ranked Georgia Tech and an overtime loss to SMU. Their first win in the calendar year came against Miami, 66–61. After the win, the Orange went on another three game losing streak. Their record improved after that streak, as they went 3–1 over their next four games. This was followed by a rough patch as they lost both games on a trip to California, and then also lost to ninth-ranked North Carolina and eleventh-ranked Duke. The Orange won their final two games against Pittsburgh and Boston College.

The Orange finished the season 12–18 overall and 6–12 in ACC play to finish in a tie for twelfth place. As the thirteenth seed in the ACC tournament, they faced twelfth seed Boston College in a re-match of the regular season finale. The Orange lost the rematch 76–73 after splitting the season series 1–1. They were not invited to the NCAA tournament or the WBIT.

== Previous season ==
The Orange finished the season 24–8 overall and 13–5 in ACC play to finish in a three-way tie for second place. As the third seed in the ACC tournament, they earned a bye into the Quarterfinals where they were upset by sixth seed Florida State. They received an at-large invitation to the NCAA Tournament, marking their first appearance since 2021. As the sixth seed in the Portland 3 they defeated eleventh seed Arizona in the First Round before losing to third seed Connecticut in the Second Round to end their season.

== Off-season ==
=== Departures ===
Departures
Name	Number	Pos.	Height	Year	Hometown	Reason for departure
Kennedi Perkins	1	G	5'6"	Sophomore	Bolingbrook, Illinois	Transferred to Marquette
Dyaisha Fair	2	G	5'5"	Graduate Student	Rochester, New York	Graduated; drafted 16th overall in the 2024 WNBA draft
Cheyenne McEvans	12	G	5'9"	Senior	Detroit, Michigan	Transferred to Florida A&M
Marilena Triantafylli	15	C	6'5"	Freshman	Athens, Greece	Transferred to Saint Louis
Alyssa Latham	23	F	6'2"	Freshman	Glenwood, Illinois	Transferred to Tennessee
Alaina Rice	25	G	5'8"	Graduate Student	Rockledge, Florida	Graduated

=== Incoming transfers ===
Incoming transfers
Name	Number	Pos.	Height	Year	Hometown	Previous school
Journey Thompson	2	F	6'3"	Junior	McMurray, Pennsylvania	Arizona State
Angelica Velez	15	G	5'7"	Sophomore	The Bronx, New York	LSU

=== Recruiting class ===
College recruiting
Name	Hometown	School	Height	Weight	Commit date
Shy Hawkins; F	Brookville, New York	Long Island Lutheran	6 ft 2 in (1.88 m)	N/A	Oct 25, 2023
Shy Hawkins; F	Recruit ratings: ESPN: (91)				
Madeline Potts; G	Victoria, Australia	Templestowe College	6 ft 0 in (1.83 m)	N/A	Nov 8, 2023
Madeline Potts; G	Recruit ratings: ESPN: (NR)				
Olivia Schmitt; G	Staten Island, New York	DME Academy	5 ft 5 in (1.65 m)	N/A	Feb 2, 2023
Olivia Schmitt; G	Recruit ratings: ESPN: (NR)				
Keira Scott; F	Daytona Beach, Florida	DME Academy	6 ft 1 in (1.85 m)	N/A	Mar 8, 2023
Keira Scott; F	Recruit ratings: ESPN: (92)				
Overall recruit ranking:
Note: In many cases, Scout, Rivals, 247Sports, On3, and ESPN may conflict in their listings of height and weight.; In these cases, the average was taken. ESPN grades are on a 100-point scale.; Sources:

== Roster ==
2024–25 Syracuse Orange women's basketball team
Players
Coaches

Pos.	#	Name	Height	Year	Previous school	Hometown
F	1	Keira Scott	6 ft 1 in (1.85 m)	Fr	DME Academy	Daytona Beach, FL
F	2	Journey Thompson	6 ft 3 in (1.91 m)	Jr	Peters Township; Arizona State	McMurray, PA
G	3	Olivia Schmitt	5 ft 5 in (1.65 m)	Fr	DME Academy	Staten Island, NY
G	4	Sophie Burrows	6 ft 2 in (1.88 m)	So	Viewbank College	Victoria, Australia
G	5	Georgia Woolley	6 ft 0 in (1.83 m)	Sr	St Paul's School; Buffalo	Brisbane, Australia
G	11	Lexi McNabb	5 ft 7 in (1.7 m)	Jr	Lincoln Prep	Chandler, AZ
F	14	Shy Hawkins	6 ft 2 in (1.88 m)	Fr	Long Island Lutheran	Brookville, NY
G	15	Angelica Velez	5 ft 7 in (1.7 m)	So	The Webb School; LSU	The Bronx, NY
G	17	Madeline Potts	6 ft 0 in (1.83 m)	Fr	Templestowe College	Victoria, Australia
F	21	Saniaa Wilson	6 ft 0 in (1.83 m)	Sr	Bishop Kearney; Buffalo	Rochester, NY
F	22	Kyra Wood	6 ft 3 in (1.91 m)	Sr	City Honors; Temple	Buffalo, NY
G	24	Dominique Camp	5 ft 8 in (1.73 m)	GS	Lakota West; Akron	Dayton, OH
C	34	Izabel Varejão	6 ft 4 in (1.93 m)	GS	Neuse Christian Academy; Michigan	Vitória, Brazil

Head coach

- Felisha Legette-Jack (Syracuse)

Assistant coach(es)

- Kristen Sharkey (Buffalo)
- Khyreed Carter (Michigan State)
- Ty Evans (Wisconsin–Whitewater)

Legend

- (C) Team captain
- (S) Suspended
- (I) Ineligible
- (W) Walk-on
- Injured
- Current redshirt

Roster
Last update: September 2, 2024

== Schedule ==
Date time, TV	Rank^{#}	Opponent^{#}	Result	Record	High points	High rebounds	High assists	Site (attendance) city, state
Exhibition
October 29, 2024*; 7:00 p.m., ACCNX		Daemen	W 90–50	–	16 – Tied	14 – Wood	6 – Velez	JMA Wireless Dome (536); Syracuse, NY
Regular season
November 5, 2024*; 7:00 p.m., ACCNX		Niagara	W 108–84	1–0	19 – Wood	8 – Tied	9 – Camp	JMA Wireless Dome (1,997); Syracuse, NY
November 10, 2024*; 2:00 p.m., ACCNX		Saint Joseph's	L 70–84	1–1	19 – Woolley	7 – Burrows	5 – Velez	JMA Wireless Dome (2,215); Syracuse, NY
November 13, 2024*; 7:00 p.m., ACCN		No. 11 Maryland	L 73–84	1–2	17 – Woolley	11 – Wood	4 – Velez	JMA Wireless Dome (2,427); Syracuse, NY
November 17, 2024*; 2:00 p.m., ACCNX		Fairleigh Dickinson	W 77–58	2–2	12 – Wood	7 – Tied	8 – Camp	JMA Wireless Dome (2,259); Syracuse, NY
November 20, 2024*; 7:00 p.m., ACCNX		Albany	L 70–73	2–3	23 – Woolley	9 – Wood	4 – Woolley	JMA Wireless Dome (2,038); Syracuse, NY
November 25, 2024*; 5:00 p.m., Flo Hoops		vs. Missouri; Emerald Coast Classic Beach Bracket semifinals	W 82–59	3–3	17 – Woolley	7 – Wilson	7 – Tied	Northwest Florida State College (300); Destin, FL
November 26, 2024*; 8:30 p.m., Flo Hoops		vs. Creighton; Emerald Coast Classic	L 59–86	3–4	11 – Scott	6 – Burrows	3 – Woolley	Northwest Florida State College (500); Destin, FL
December 1, 2024*; 12:00 p.m., ACCNX		Yale	W 78–50	4–4	16 – Woolley	11 – Varejão	5 – Camp	JMA Wireless Dome (3,036); Syracuse, NY
December 4, 2024*; 7:15 p.m., ESPNU		at Texas A&M; ACC–SEC Challenge	L 45–57	4–5	14 – Scott	11 – Wood	4 – Velez	Reed Arena (3,043); College Station, TX
December 8, 2024; 12:00 p.m., ACCN		No. 10 Notre Dame	L 62–93	4–6 (0–1)	16 – Scott	10 – Varejão	2 – Tied	JMA Wireless Dome (4,440); Syracuse, NY
December 18, 2024*; 6:00 p.m., ESPN+		at Binghamton	W 87–60	5–6	18 – Woolley	6 – Varejão	8 – Camp	Binghamton University Events Center (2,372); Vestal, NY
December 21, 2024*; 11:00 a.m., ACCNX		Dartmouth	W 87–52	6–6	16 – Wilson	10 – Wood	10 – Camp	JMA Wireless Dome (2,772); Syracuse, NY
January 2, 2025; 7:00 p.m., ACCNX		at No. 13 Georgia Tech	L 68–85	6–7 (0–2)	22 – Woolley	8 – Tied	4 – Velez	McCamish Pavilion (2,076); Atlanta, GA
January 5, 2025; 2:00 p.m., ACCN		at Florida State	L 73–85	6–8 (0–3)	14 – Burrows	10 – Burrows	10 – Velez	Donald L. Tucker Center (1,849); Tallahassee, FL
January 9, 2025; 10:30 a.m., ACCN		SMU	L 71–72 ^{OT}	6–9 (0–4)	18 – Woolley	8 – Thompson	6 – Camp	JMA Wireless Dome (2,856); Syracuse, NY
January 12, 2025; 6:00 p.m., ACCN		Miami (FL)	W 66–61	7–9 (1–4)	18 – Wood	10 – Wood	4 – Tied	JMA Wireless Dome (3,185); Syracuse, NY
January 16, 2025; 7:00 p.m., ACCNX		at Louisville	L 62–72	7–10 (1–5)	17 – Tied	9 – Wood	5 – Woolley	KFC Yum! Center (7,442); Louisville, KY
January 19, 2025; 12:00 p.m., ACCN		at Boston College	L 51–92	7–11 (1–6)	15 – Burrows	8 – Burrows	4 – Camp	Conte Forum (1,386); Chestnut Hill, MA
January 23, 2025; 6:00 p.m., ACCN		No. 20 NC State	L 66–74	7–12 (1–7)	16 – Burrows	9 – Tied	8 – Camp	JMA Wireless Dome (2,445); Syracuse, NY
January 26, 2025; 2:00 p.m., ACCNX		at Clemson	W 67–55	8–12 (2–7)	16 – Tied	12 – Varejão	4 – Woolley	Littlejohn Coliseum (2,540); Clemson, SC
February 2, 2025; 12:00 p.m., ACCN		Virginia	L 67–70	8–13 (2–8)	22 – Burrows	15 – Wood	7 – Camp	JMA Wireless Dome (3,994); Syracuse, NY
February 6, 2025; 6:00 p.m., ACCN		at Virginia Tech	W 93–87	9–13 (3–8)	28 – Burrows	5 – Wood	10 – Camp	Cassell Coliseum (4,902); Blacksburg, VA
February 9, 2025; 2:00 p.m., ACCN		Wake Forest	W 62–50	10–13 (4–8)	21 – Woolley	10 – Burrows	3 – Woolley	JMA Wireless Dome (3,735); Syracuse, NY
February 13, 2025; 10:00 p.m., ACCN		at Stanford	L 58–79	10–14 (4–9)	18 – Woolley	8 – Burros	3 – Schmitt	Maples Pavilion (2,914); Stanford, CA
February 16, 2025; 6:00 p.m., ACCN		at California	L 69–75	10–15 (4–10)	23 – Woolley	8 – Wood	4 – Schmitt	Haas Pavilion (3,849); Berkeley, CA
February 20, 2025; 6:00 p.m., ACCN		No. 9 North Carolina	L 58–68	10–16 (4–11)	17 – Woolley	4 – Tied	4 – Woolley	JMA Wireless Dome (3,271); Syracuse, NY
February 23, 2025; 2:00 p.m., The CW		at No. 11 Duke	L 49–80	10–17 (4–12)	14 – Woolley	8 – Burrows	3 – Burrows	Cameron Indoor Stadium (3,078); Durham, NC
February 27, 2025; 7:00 p.m., ACCNX		Pittsburgh	W 83–65	11–17 (5–12)	25 – Woolley	8 – Wood	9 – Tied	JMA Wireless Dome (2,667); Syracuse, NY
March 2, 2025; 4:00 p.m., ACCN		Boston College	W 82–57	12–17 (6–12)	19 – Woolley	9 – Varejão	6 – Tied	JMA Wireless Dome (3,640); Syracuse, NY
ACC tournament
March 5, 2025*; 1:00 p.m., ACCN	(13)	vs. (12) Boston College; First Round	L 73–76	12–18	23 – Burrows	5 – Tied	6 – Woolley	Greensboro Coliseum (6,932); Greensboro, NC
*Non-conference game. ^{#}Rankings from AP Poll. (#) Tournament seedings in parentheses. All times are in Eastern.

== Rankings ==
Ranking movements Legend: ██ Increase in ranking ██ Decrease in ranking — = Not ranked RV = Received votes
	Week																				
Poll	Pre	1	2	3	4	5	6	7	8	9	10	11	12	13	14	15	16	17	18	19	Final
AP	RV	—	—	—	—	—	—	—	—	—	—	—	—	—	—	—	—	—	—	—	
Coaches	—	—	—	—	—	—	—	—	—	—	—	—	—	—	—	—	—	—	—	—	
