= 2024–25 Boston College Eagles women's basketball team =

Intercollegiate basketball season

2024–25 Boston College Eagles women's basketball

WBIT, First Round
- Conference: Atlantic Coast Conference
- Record: 16–18 (6–12 ACC)
- Head coach: Joanna Bernabei-McNamee (7th season)
- Assistant coaches: Sean Ehlbeck (2nd season); Shelby Boyle (2nd season); Chris Meadows Sr. (2nd season); DeNesha Stallworth (1st season)
- Home arena: Conte Forum

2024–25 ACC women's basketball standings
	Conf.				Overall
Team	W		L	PCT	W		L	PCT
No. 9 NC State	16	–	2	.889	28	–	7	.800
No. 8 Notre Dame	16	–	2	.889	28	–	6	.824
No. 7 Duke †	14	–	4	.778	29	–	8	.784
No. 22 Florida State	13	–	5	.722	24	–	9	.727
No. 12 North Carolina	13	–	5	.722	29	–	8	.784
Louisville	13	–	5	.722	22	–	11	.667
California	12	–	6	.667	25	–	9	.735
Virginia Tech	9	–	9	.500	19	–	13	.594
Georgia Tech	9	–	9	.500	22	–	11	.667
Virginia	8	–	10	.444	17	–	15	.531
Stanford	8	–	10	.444	16	–	15	.516
Boston College	6	–	12	.333	16	–	18	.471
Syracuse	6	–	12	.333	12	–	18	.400
Clemson	6	–	12	.333	14	–	17	.452
Pittsburgh	5	–	13	.278	13	–	19	.406
Miami (FL)	4	–	14	.222	14	–	15	.483
Wake Forest	2	–	16	.111	9	–	20	.310
SMU	2	–	16	.111	10	–	20	.333
† 2025 ACC tournament winner Rankings from AP Poll

The 2024–25 Boston College Eagles women's basketball team represented Boston College during the 2024–25 NCAA Division I women's basketball season. The Eagles were led by seventh-year head coach Joanna Bernabei-McNamee. They played their home games at the Conte Forum in Chestnut Hill, Massachusetts as members of the Atlantic Coast Conference.

The Eagles started the season with three straight wins over non-Power 4 foes before losing their first game of the season against Harvard 70–78. They followed the loss with three more wins against non-Power 4 foes. They then traveled to the Bahamas to take part in the Baha Mar tournament. There, they lost to eighteenth-ranked Ole Miss and Oregon State to leave winless. They returned to participate in the ACC–SEC Challenge, where they lost to Arkansas by eleven points. They followed that losing streak with an ACC win against Virginia and three wins against non-Power 4 opponents. After that run, the ACC schedule began in earnest and the Eagles lost their next five games. Four of those games were against ranked opponents, but all the losses were by double digits. They rebounded with back-to-back ACC wins against Miami and Syracuse. The Eagles lost seven of their next eight games, with their only win coming against Clemson. They suffered three ranked losses during that stretch. They finished the regular season by winning two of their last three games, defeating SMU and Virginia Tech in overtime but losing a re-match with Syracuse.

The Eagles finished the season 16–18 overall and 6–12 in ACC play to finish in a tie for twelfth place. As the twelfth seed in the ACC tournament, they faced thirteenth seed Syracuse for a third time this season. The regular season series finished 1–1, but the Eagles triumphed 76–73 in the tournament to advance to the second round. They lost 78–71 in the second round to fifth seed and fourteenth ranked North Carolina. They received an at-large bid to the WBIT and were an unranked team in the St. Joseph's section of the bracket. They lost to fourth seed Villanova 76–70 in the first round to end their season.

== Previous season ==
The Eagles finished the season 14–19 overall and 5–13 in ACC play to finish in a tie for twelfth place. As the thirteenth seed in the ACC tournament, they defeated twelfth seed Clemson in the first round before losing to fifth seed Louisville in the second round. They were not invited to the NCAA tournament or the WBIT.

== Off-season ==
=== Departures ===
Departures
Name	Number	Pos.	Height	Year	Hometown	Reason for departure
JoJo Lacey	4	G	6'1"	Senior	Douglassville, Pennsylvania	Transferred to Rutgers
Jayda Johnson	5	G	6'1"	Freshman	West Haven, Connecticut	Transferred to Dayton
Ally VanTimmeren	12	F	6'2"	Junior	Allendale, Michigan	Transferred to Michigan

=== Incoming transfers ===
Incoming transfers
Name	Number	Pos.	Height	Year	Hometown	Previous school
Kennedi Jackson	23	F	6'4"	Graduate student	New Orleans, Louisiana	Charleston Southern

=== Recruiting class ===
College recruiting
Name	Hometown	School	Height	Weight	Commit date
Tatum Greene; SG	Baltimore, Maryland	Saint John's	6 ft 2 in (1.88 m)	N/A	
Tatum Greene; SG	Recruit ratings: ESPN: (91)				
Déborah Mukeba Kasanda; C	Fleurus, Belgium	Winston-Salem Christian	6 ft 5 in (1.96 m)	N/A	
Déborah Mukeba Kasanda; C	Recruit ratings: ESPN: (NR)				
Athena Tomlinson; PG	Fresno, California	Clovis West	5 ft 5 in (1.65 m)	N/A	
Athena Tomlinson; PG	Recruit ratings: ESPN: (93)				
Overall recruit ranking:
Note: In many cases, Scout, Rivals, 247Sports, On3, and ESPN may conflict in their listings of height and weight.; In these cases, the average was taken. ESPN grades are on a 100-point scale.; Sources:

== Roster ==
2024–25 Boston College Eagles women's basketball team
Players
Coaches

Pos.	#	Name	Height	Year	Previous school	Hometown
G	0	Athena Tomlinson	5 ft 5 in (1.65 m)	Fr	Clovis West	Fresno, CA
G	1	JaKayla Thompson	5 ft 8 in (1.73 m)	So	duPont Manual	Louisville, KY
G	2	Kaylah Ivey	5 ft 8 in (1.73 m)	RS Sr	Riverdale Baptist School	Forestville, MD
G	3	Ava McGee	5 ft 10 in (1.78 m)	Jr	Maret	Washington, D.C.
F	10	Nene Ndiaye	6 ft 1 in (1.85 m)	So	Orangewood Academy	Saly, Senegal
C	12	Déborah Mukeba Kasanda	6 ft 5 in (1.96 m)	Fr	Winston-Salem Christian	Fleurus, Belgium
G	13	Tatum Greene	6 ft 3 in (1.91 m)	Fr	Saint John's	Baltimore, MD
G	14	Kayla Lezama	5 ft 11 in (1.8 m)	Jr	Noble and Greenough School	Boston, MA
F	16	Lili Krasovec	6 ft 3 in (1.91 m)	So	Winston-Salem Christian	Budapest, Hungary
G	21	Andrea Daley	6 ft 0 in (1.83 m)	Sr	Miami Country Day	Miami, FL
F	23	Kennedi Jackson	6 ft 4 in (1.93 m)	GS	Ursuline Academy; Charleston Southern	New Orleans, LA
G	24	Dontavia Waggoner	6 ft 0 in (1.83 m)	GS	The Ensworth School	Nashville, TN
G	30	T'Yana Todd	6 ft 0 in (1.83 m)	Jr	IMG Academy	Vaughan, Canada
F	32	Teya Sidberry	6 ft 1 in (1.85 m)	Jr	Judge Memorial; Utah	Salt Lake City, UT
G	33	Savannah Samuel	6 ft 1 in (1.85 m)	Sr	St. Francis; West Virginia	Woodstock, GA

Head coach

- Joanna Bernabei-McNamee (West Liberty)

Assistant coach(es)

- Sean Ehlbeck (Maryland)
- Shelby Boyle (Transylvania University)
- Chris Meadows Sr. (St. Bonaventure)
- DeNesha Stallworth (Kentucky)

Legend

- (C) Team captain
- (S) Suspended
- (I) Ineligible
- (W) Walk-on
- Injured
- Current redshirt

Roster
Last update: March 28, 2025

== Schedule ==
Date time, TV	Rank^{#}	Opponent^{#}	Result	Record	High points	High rebounds	High assists	Site (attendance) city, state
Regular season
November 4, 2024*; 5:00 p.m., ACCNX		Lafayette	W 85–55	1–0	20 – Jackson	13 – Jackson	9 – Ivey	Conte Forum (510); Chestnut Hill, MA
November 7, 2024*; 6:00 p.m., ACCNX		Sacred Heart	W 102–58	2–0	19 – Daley	8 – Daley	8 – Ivey	Conte Forum (537); Chestnut Hill, MA
November 11, 2024*; 2:00 p.m., ACCNX		Northeastern	W 92–46	3–0	16 – Waggoner	10 – Sidberry	11 – Ivey	Conte Forum (1,016); Chestnut Hill, MA
November 14, 2024*; 7:00 p.m., ESPN+		at Harvard	L 70–78	3–1	16 – Tied	7 – Sidberry	2 – Tied	Lavietes Pavilion (694); Boston, MA
November 17, 2024*; 12:00 p.m., ACCNX		Providence	W 67–60	4–1	20 – Sidberry	9 – Daley	8 – Ivey	Conte Forum (1,562); Chestnut Hill, MA
November 20, 2024*; 6:00 p.m., ACCNX		New Hampshire	W 80–45	5–1	16 – Waggoner	7 – Greene	12 – Ivey	Conte Forum (647); Chestnut Hill, MA
November 23, 2024*; 2:00 p.m., ESPN+		at Holy Cross	W 81–55	6–1	18 – Sidberry	5 – Tied	4 – Ivey	Hart Center (1,074); Worcester, MA
November 25, 2024*; 5:00 p.m., FloHoops		vs. No. 18 Ole Miss; Baha Mar Championship semifinals	L 55–92	6–2	13 – Waggoner	7 – Waggoner	5 – Todd	Baha Mar Convention Center (567); Nassau, Bahamas
November 27, 2024*; 5:00 p.m., FloHoops		vs. Oregon State; Baha Mar Championship 3rd place game	L 49–54	6–3	13 – Todd	8 – Sidberry	5 – Ivey	Baha Mar Convention Center (417); Nassau, Bahamas
December 5, 2024*; 7:00 p.m., SECN		at Arkansas; ACC–SEC Challenge	L 64–75	6–4	17 – Sidberry	13 – Sidberry	4 – Ivey	Bud Walton Arena (2,252); Fayetteville, AR
December 8, 2024; 2:00 p.m., ACCNX		at Virginia	W 72–57	7–4 (1–0)	21 – Todd	7 – Sidberry	5 – Ivey	John Paul Jones Arena (3,948); Charlottesville, VA
December 11, 2024*; 11:00 a.m., ACCNX		UMass	W 62–57	8–4	11 – Sidberry	14 – Daley	3 – Tied	Conte Forum (3,116); Chestnut Hill, MA
December 15, 2024*; 12:00 p.m., ACCNX		Bryant	W 94–46	9–4	14 – Sidberry	6 – Waggoner	6 – Tied	Conte Forum (647); Chestnut Hill, MA
December 20, 2024*; 12:00 p.m., ACCNX		Central Connecticut	W 83–56	10–4	17 – Waggoner	10 – Sidberry	4 – Tied	Conte Forum (312); Chestnut Hill, MA
December 29, 2024; 2:00 p.m., ACCN		Louisville	L 73–86	10–5 (1–1)	24 – Sidberry	6 – Siberry	5 – Daley	Conte Forum (1,138); Chestnut Hill, MA
January 2, 2025; 7:00 p.m., ACCNX		No. 14 Duke	L 59–86	10–6 (1–2)	20 – Waggoner	5 – Tied	2 – Tied	Conte Forum (2,273); Chestnut Hill, MA
January 5, 2025; 2:00 p.m., ACCNX		at No. 22 NC State	L 52–91	10–7 (1–3)	20 – Todd	9 – Sidberry	2 – Tied	Reynolds Coliseum (5,500); Raleigh, NC
January 12, 2025; 2:00 p.m., ACCN		at No. 19 North Carolina	L 67–80	10–8 (1–4)	18 – Todd	7 – Samuel	2 – Tied	Carmichael Arena (3,478); Chapel Hill, NC
January 16, 2025; 7:00 p.m., ACCNX		at Miami (FL)	W 83–79	11–8 (2–4)	29 – Todd	7 – Daley	16 – Ivey	Watsco Center (1,925); Coral Gables, FL
January 19, 2025; 12:00 p.m., ACCN		Syracuse	W 92–51	12–8 (3–4)	22 – Waggoner	13 – Sidberry	10 – Ivey	Conte Forum (1,386); Chestnut Hill, MA
January 23, 2025; 7:00 p.m., ACCNX		No. 3 Notre Dame	L 63–89	12–9 (3–5)	18 – Todd	10 – Daley	3 – Ndiaye	Conte Forum (2,879); Chestnut Hill, MA
January 26, 2025; 2:00 p.m., ACCN		at Wake Forest	L 59–69	12–10 (3–6)	16 – Waggoner	5 – Tied	2 – Tied	LJVM Coliseum (1,076); Winston-Salem, NC
January 30, 2025; 6:00 p.m., ACCN		No. 25 Florida State	L 80–104	12–11 (3–7)	28 – Sidberry	10 – Sidberry	5 – Tomlinson	Conte Forum (933); Chestnut Hill, MA
February 2, 2025; 2:00 p.m., ACCNX		Clemson	W 94–65	13–11 (4–7)	20 – Sidberry	11 – Daley	8 – Ivey	Conte Forum (1,910); Chestnut Hill, MA
February 6, 2025; 6:00 p.m., ACCNX		at Pittsburgh	L 66–79	13–12 (4–8)	16 – Ndiaye	9 – Sidberry	4 – Ivey	Peterson Events Center (292); Pittsburgh, PA
February 9, 2025; 2:00 p.m., ACCNX		No. 17 Georgia Tech	L 51–71	13–13 (4–9)	19 – Todd	5 – Tied	2 – Tied	Conte Forum (1,121); Chestnut Hill, MA
February 13, 2025; 10:00 p.m., ACCNX		at California	L 63–72	13–14 (4–10)	24 – Todd	7 – Sidberry	4 – Daley	Haas Pavilion (2,007); Berkeley, CA
February 16, 2025; 5:00 p.m., ACCNX		at Stanford	L 75–80	13–15 (4–11)	20 – Ivey	10 – Sidberry	2 – Tied	Conte Forum (3,561); Chestnut Hill, MA
February 23, 2025; 2:00 p.m., ACCNX		SMU	W 87–78	14–15 (5–11)	28 – Waggoner	7 – Tied	8 – Ivey	Conte Forum (1,122); Chestnut Hill, MA
February 27, 2025; 7:00 p.m., ACCNX		Virginia Tech	W 92–89 ^{OT}	15–15 (6–11)	22 – Sidberry	12 – Tied	7 – Ivey	Conte Forum (1,121); Chestnut Hill, MA
March 2, 2025; 4:00 p.m., ACCN		at Syracuse	L 57–82	15–16 (6–12)	20 – Sidberry	12 – Daley	2 – Waggoner	JMA Wireless Dome (3,640); Syracuse, NY
ACC Women's Tournament
March 5, 2025*; 1:00 p.m., ACCN	(12)	vs. (13) Syracuse; First Round	W 76–73	16–16	32 – Waggoner	17 – Sidberry	3 – Daley	Greensboro Coliseum (6,932); Greensboro, NC
March 6, 2025; 11:00 a.m., ACCN	(12)	vs. (5) No. 14 North Carolina; Second Round	L 71–78	16–17	18 – Greene	8 – Waggoner	5 – Ivey	Greensboro Coliseum (11,203); Greensboro, NC
WBIT
March 20, 2025*; 7:00 p.m., ESPN+		at (4) Villanova; First Round	L 70–76	16–18	21 – Sidberry	8 – Sidberry	4 – Daley	Finneran Pavilion (755); Villanova, PA
*Non-conference game. ^{#}Rankings from AP Poll. (#) Tournament seedings in parentheses. All times are in Eastern.
