= 2024–25 California Golden Bears women's basketball team =

Intercollegiate basketball season

2024–25 California Golden Bears women's basketball

Raising the B.A.R Invitational champions

NCAA tournament, First Round
- Conference: Atlantic Coast Conference
- Record: 25–9 (12–6 ACC)
- Head coach: Charmin Smith (6th season)
- Associate head coach: Heidi Heintz (3rd season)
- Assistant coaches: Travon Bryant (2nd season); Jenny Huth (1st season); Eliza Pierre (4th season)
- Home arena: Haas Pavilion

2024–25 ACC women's basketball standings
	Conf.				Overall
Team	W		L	PCT	W		L	PCT
No. 9 NC State	16	–	2	.889	28	–	7	.800
No. 8 Notre Dame	16	–	2	.889	28	–	6	.824
No. 7 Duke †	14	–	4	.778	29	–	8	.784
No. 22 Florida State	13	–	5	.722	24	–	9	.727
No. 12 North Carolina	13	–	5	.722	29	–	8	.784
Louisville	13	–	5	.722	22	–	11	.667
California	12	–	6	.667	25	–	9	.735
Virginia Tech	9	–	9	.500	19	–	13	.594
Georgia Tech	9	–	9	.500	22	–	11	.667
Virginia	8	–	10	.444	17	–	15	.531
Stanford	8	–	10	.444	16	–	15	.516
Boston College	6	–	12	.333	16	–	18	.471
Syracuse	6	–	12	.333	12	–	18	.400
Clemson	6	–	12	.333	14	–	17	.452
Pittsburgh	5	–	13	.278	13	–	19	.406
Miami (FL)	4	–	14	.222	14	–	15	.483
Wake Forest	2	–	16	.111	9	–	20	.310
SMU	2	–	16	.111	10	–	20	.333
† 2025 ACC tournament winner Rankings from AP Poll

The 2024–25 California Golden Bears women's basketball team represented the University of California, Berkeley during the 2024–25 NCAA Division I women's basketball season. The Golden Bears were led by sixth-year head coach Charmin Smith and played their home games at Haas Pavilion. They competed as first-year members of the Atlantic Coast Conference.

The Golden Bears started the season well, winning their first six games of the season. They played only one traditional Power-4 school during this run, defeating Auburn 63–59 on November 22. The Golden Bears participated in the Acrisure Holiday Invitational where they lost their opening game against Michigan State 78–72 but won the third-place game against Arizona 74–62. They welcomed nineteenth-ranked Alabama to the Haas Pavilion for the ACC–SEC Challenge, and the Golden Bears pulled off the upset 69–65. They won their next three games, including a rivalry and ACC opening win over Stanford to enter the rankings at number twenty-four. They won the Raising the B.A.R Invitational by defeating Fordham and Temple. Their winning streak ended on their first trip to the east coast, where they lost to Clemson 69–58. The won three games after that, including a defeat of number twenty-one NC State. They ascended to number eighteen in the polls when they lost at number sixteen Duke 72–38. The Golden Bears went 3–3 over their next six games and fell out of the rankings. They won a rivalry rematch with Stanford while losses included games against number fifteen North Carolina and number three Notre Dame. The Golden Bears finished the season going 5–1 over their next six games, with their only loss coming at Virginia Tech by three points. They won their final game of the season over Miami 82–63.

The Golden Bears finished the season 25–9 overall and 12–6 in ACC play to finish in seventh place. As the seventh seed in the ACC tournament, earned a bye into the second round where they defeated Virginia 75–58. They lost to sixth ranked and second seed Notre Dame by nine points in the Quarterfinals. They received an at-large invitation to the NCAA tournament and were the eighth-seed in the Spokane 4 region. They lost to ninth seed Mississippi State 69–46 in the First Round to end their season.

== Previous season ==
The Golden Bears finished the season 19–15, 7–11 in Pac-12 play to finish in a tie for eighth place. As an eighth seed in the Pac-12 women's tournament they defeated Washington State in the First Round before falling to first-seed Stanford in the Quarterfinals. They received an at-large invitation to the WBIT where they defeated Hawaii in the First Round before losing to Saint Joseph's in the Second Round.

== Offseason ==
=== Departures ===
California Departures
Name	Num.	Pos.	Height	Year	Hometown	Reason for departure
Leilani McIntosh	1	G	5'5"	Graduate Student	Phoenix, Arizona	Graduated
Ila Lane	12	F/C	6'4"	Graduate Student	Moraga, California	Graduated
Alma Elsnitz	14	G	5'11"	Senior	Stockholm, Sweden	Graduated
Kemery Martín	15	G	6'0"	(redshirt) Junior	Sandy, Utah	Transferred to BYU
Mia Mastrov	21	G	5'11"	Junior	Lafayette, California	Graduated
McKayla Williams	24	G	6'1"	Senior	Los Angeles, California	Graduated
Ornela Muca	31	G	5'7"	Senior	Athens, Greece	Transferred to Pepperdine

=== Incoming transfers ===
Incoming transfers
Name	Num	Pos.	Height	Year	Hometown	Previous School
Jayda Noble	2	G	5'11"	Graduate Student	Spokane, Washington	Washington
Kayla Williams	4	G	5'7"	Graduate Student	Los Angeles, California	USC
Gisella Maul	12	G	5'11"	Sophomore	Cedar Park, Texas	Texas

=== Recruiting ===
College recruiting
Name	Hometown	School	Height	Weight	Commit date
Gabrielle Abigor; C	Walnut Creek, California	Berean Christian	6 ft 3 in (1.91 m)	N/A	
Gabrielle Abigor; C	Recruit ratings: ESPN: (NR)				
Sofia Bowes; G	San Ramon, California	San Ramon Valley	5 ft 10 in (1.78 m)	N/A	
Sofia Bowes; G	Recruit ratings: ESPN: (NR)				
Lola Donez; G	Lahaina, Hawaii	Lahainaluna	5 ft 11 in (1.80 m)	N/A	
Lola Donez; G	Recruit ratings: ESPN: (NR)				
Kamryn Mafua; G/F	Folsom, California	Folsom	6 ft 1 in (1.85 m)	N/A	
Kamryn Mafua; G/F	Recruit ratings: ESPN: (94)				
Zahra King; G	Brooklyn, New York	Westtown	5 ft 10 in (1.78 m)	N/A	
Zahra King; G	Recruit ratings: ESPN: (92)				
Overall recruit ranking:
Note: In many cases, Scout, Rivals, 247Sports, On3, and ESPN may conflict in their listings of height and weight.; In these cases, the average was taken. ESPN grades are on a 100-point scale.; Sources:

== Roster ==
2024–25 California Golden Bears women's basketball team
Players
Coaches

Pos.	#	Name	Height	Year	Previous school	Hometown
F	0	Michelle Onyiah	6 ft 3 in (1.91 m)	GS	Eleanor Roosevelt	Eastvale, CA
G	2	Jayda Noble	5 ft 11 in (1.8 m)	GS	Mount Spokane; Washington	Spokane, WA
G	3	Zahra King	5 ft 10 in (1.78 m)	Fr	Westtown	Brooklyn, NY
G	4	Kayla Williams	5 ft 7 in (1.7 m)	GS	Bishop Montgomery; USC	Los Angeles, CA
G	5	Lola Donez	5 ft 11 in (1.8 m)	Fr	Lahainaluna	Lahaina, HI
G	7	Marta Suárez	6 ft 3 in (1.91 m)	RS Sr	Joaquim Blume Institute; Tennessee	Oviedo, Spain
G	10	Lulu Twidale	5 ft 9 in (1.75 m)	So	South West Metro Pirates	Sunshine Coast, Australia
G	12	Gisella Maul	5 ft 11 in (1.8 m)	So	Cedar Park; Texas	Cedar Park, TX
G/F	14	Kamryn Mafua	6 ft 1 in (1.85 m)	Fr	Folsom	Folsom, CA
F	22	Claudia Langarita	6 ft 4 in (1.93 m)	Sr	INS Joaquim Blume; San Francisco	Barcelona, Spain
G	23	Anastasia Drosouni	5 ft 11 in (1.8 m)	So	Expaideftiria Fryganiotis	Thessaloniki, Greece
G	33	Ioanna Krimili	5 ft 10 in (1.78 m)	GS	Aristotelio College; San Francisco	Heraklion, Greece
C	33	Gabrielle Abigor	6 ft 3 in (1.91 m)	Fr	Berean Christian	Walnut Creek, CA
G	42	Sofia Bowes	5 ft 10 in (1.78 m)	Fr	San Ramon Valley	San Ramon, CA

Head coach

- Charmin Smith (Stanford)

Assistant coach(es)

- Heidi Heintz (UC Davis)
- Travon Bryant (Missouri)
- Jenny Huth (Colorado)
- Eliza Pierre (California)

Legend

- (C) Team captain
- (S) Suspended
- (I) Ineligible
- (W) Walk-on
- Injured
- Current redshirt

Roster
Last update: August 19, 2024

== Schedule and results ==
Date time, TV	Rank^{#}	Opponent^{#}	Result	Record	High points	High rebounds	High assists	Site (attendance) city, state
Exhibition
October 31, 2024*; 7:00 p.m.		Vanguard	W 83–47	–	–	–	–	Haas Pavilion; Berkeley, CA
Regular season
November 4, 2024*; 6:00 p.m., ACCNX/ESPN+		Saint Mary's	W 90–58	1–0	24 – Twidale	8 – Suárez	6 – Williams	Haas Pavilion (1,231); Berkeley, CA
November 7, 2024*; 11:00 a.m., ACCNX/ESPN+		Idaho State	W 88–36	2–0	18 – Krimili	8 – Onyiah	6 – Twidale	Haas Pavilion (5,066); Berkeley, CA
November 9, 2024*; 1:00 p.m., MW Network		at San Jose State	W 82–53	3–0	18 – Krimili	10 – Onyiah	2 – Tied	Provident Credit Union Event Center (1,228); San Jose, CA
November 14, 2024*; 6:00 p.m., ESPN+		at Gonzaga	W 86–65	4–0	25 – Williams	6 – Onyiah	6 – Williams	McCarthey Athletic Center (5,060); Spokane, WA
November 20, 2024*; 7:00 p.m., ACCNX/ESPN+		Grambling State	W 86–63	5–0	19 – Twidale	7 – Ackerman	6 – Krimili	Haas Pavilion (1,153); Berkeley, CA
November 22, 2024*; 6:00 p.m., ACCNX/ESPN+		Auburn	W 63–59	6–0	22 – Twidale	8 – Tied	6 – Krimili	Haas Pavilion (1,341); Berkeley, CA
November 26, 2024*; 11:00 a.m., TruTV		vs. Michigan State; Acrisure Classic semifinal	L 72–78	6–1	20 – Twidale	11 – Suárez	5 – Krimili	Acrisure Arena (325); Palm Springs, CA
November 27, 2024*; 11:00 a.m., TruTV		vs. Arizona; Acrisure Classic third-place game	W 74–62	7–1	25 – Onyiah	13 – Onyiah	6 – Tied	Acrisure Arena (315); Palm Springs, CA
December 5, 2024*; 6:00 p.m., ESPNU		No. 19 Alabama; ACC–SEC Challenge	W 69–65	8–1	21 – Williams	9 – Onyiah	6 – Suárez	Haas Pavilion (1,432); Berkeley, CA
December 7, 2024*; 2:00 p.m., ESPN+		at Pacific	W 74–66	9–1	22 – Krimili	5 – Tied	6 – Williams	Alex G. Spanos Center (819); Stockton, CA
December 13, 2024; 7:00 p.m., ACCNX/ESPN+		Stanford	W 83–63	10–1 (1–0)	21 – Suárez	7 – Tied	6 – Suárez	Haas Pavilion (3,189); Berkeley, CA
December 15, 2024*; 2:00 p.m., ACCNX/ESPN+		Austin Peay	W 71–45	11–1	18 – Williams	8 – Williams	6 – Williams	Haas Pavilion (1,428); Berkeley, CA
December 21, 2024*; 5:00 p.m., ACCNX/ESPN+	No. 24	Fordham; Raising the B.A.R Invitational semifinal	W 69–53	12–1	19 – Krimili	6 – Tied	4 – Krimili	Haas Pavilion (1,856); Berkeley, CA
December 22, 2024*; 5:00 p.m., ACCNX/ESPN+	No. 24	Temple; Raising the B.A.R Invitational championship game	W 89–63	13–1	20 – Tied	7 – Tied	5 – Williams	Haas Pavilion (1,912); Berkeley, CA
January 2, 2025; 4:00 p.m., ACCNX/ESPN+	No. 20	at Clemson	L 58–69	13–2 (1–1)	18 – Krimili	10 – Onyiah	4 – Williams	Littlejohn Coliseum (1,143); Clemson, SC
January 5, 2025; 3:00 p.m., ACCN	No. 20	at SMU	W 81–66	14–2 (2–1)	19 – Suárez	6 – Suárez	7 – Williams	Moody Coliseum (1,323); University Park, TX
January 9, 2025; 7:00 p.m., ACCNX/ESPN+	No. 24	No. 21 NC State	W 78–71	15–2 (3–1)	17 – Suárez	12 – Suárez	6 – Williams	Haas Pavilion (1,874); Berkeley, CA
January 12, 2025; 2:00 p.m., ACCNX/ESPN+	No. 24	Florida State	W 82–70	16–2 (4–1)	19 – Twidale	7 – Tied	4 – Tied	Haas Pavilion (2,311); Berkeley, CA
January 16, 2025; 5:00 p.m., ACCN	No. 18	at No. 16 Duke	L 38–72	16–3 (4–2)	8 – Williams	7 – Suárez	3 – Tied	Cameron Indoor Stadium (2,428); Durham, NC
January 19, 2025; 11:00 a.m., ACCNX/ESPN+	No. 18	at Wake Forest	W 67–55	17–3 (5–2)	16 – Suárez	10 – Onyiah	5 – Tied	LJVM Coliseum (1,123); Winston-Salem, NC
January 23, 2025; 7:00 p.m., ACCNX/ESPN+	No. 22	at Stanford	W 75–72	18–3 (6–2)	18 – Williams	7 – Suárez	4 – Twidale	Maples Pavilion (3,599); Stanford, CA
January 30, 2025; 7:00 p.m., ACCNX/ESPN+	No. 19	No. 15 North Carolina	L 52–65	18–4 (6–3)	20 – Krimili	8 – Suárez	4 – Tied	Haas Pavilion (2,866); Berkeley, CA
February 2, 2025; 2:00 p.m., ACCNX/ESPN+	No. 19	Pittsburgh	W 84–53	19–4 (7–3)	16 – Tied	9 – Onyiah	4 – Krimili	Haas Pavilion (2,733); Berkeley, CA
February 6, 2025; 5:00 p.m., ACCN	No. 21	at Louisville	L 63–70	19–5 (7–4)	15 – Onyiah	11 – Onyiah	4 – Williams	KFC Yum! Center (7,093); Louisville, KY
February 9, 2025; 11:00 a.m., ACCN	No. 21	at No. 3 Notre Dame	L 52–91	19–6 (7–5)	14 – Twidale	8 – Suárez	3 – Tied	Purcell Pavilion (8,864); Notre Dame, IN
February 13, 2025; 7:00 p.m., ACCNX/ESPN+		Boston College	W 72–63	20–6 (8–5)	21 – Onyiah	11 – Onyiah	6 – Williams	Haas Pavilion (2,007); Berkeley, CA
February 16, 2025; 3:00 p.m., ACCNX/ESPN+		Syracuse	W 75–69	21–6 (9–5)	21 – Williams	6 – Tied	5 – Williams	Haas Pavilion (3,849); Berkeley, CA
February 20, 2025; 4:00 p.m., ACCNX/ESPN+		at Virginia	W 76–70	22–6 (10–5)	18 – Tied	11 – Onyiah	5 – Tied	John Paul Jones Arena (5,496); Charlottesville, VA
February 23, 2025; 11:00 a.m., ACCN		at Virginia Tech	L 84–87	22–7 (10–6)	20 – Suárez	10 – Suárez	5 – Tied	Cassell Coliseum (6,051); Blacksburg, VA
February 27, 2025; 7:00 p.m., ACCNX/ESPN+		Georgia Tech	W 79–65	23–7 (11–6)	24 – Onyiah	10 – Onyiah	6 – Twidale	Haas Pavilion (1,933); Berkeley, CA
March 2, 2025; 2:00 p.m., ACCNX/ESPN+		Miami	W 82–63	24–7 (12–6)	26 – Onkyiah	10 – Tied	6 – Twidale	Haas Pavilion (3,295); Berkeley, CA
ACC Women's Tournament
March 6, 2025; 2:00 p.m., ACCN	(7)	vs. (10) Virginia; Second round	W 75–58	25–7	26 – Tied	10 – Tied	4 – Tied	Greensboro Coliseum (5,828); Greensboro, NC
March 7, 2025; 2:00 p.m., ESPN2	(7)	vs. (2) No. 6 Notre Dame; Quarterfinals	L 64–73	25–8	16 – Twidale	11 – Suárez	4 – Krimili	Greensboro Coliseum (7,108); Greensboro, NC
NCAA Women's Tournament
March 22, 2025*; 2:30 p.m., ESPN2	(8 S4)	vs. (9 S4) Mississippi State; First Round	L 46–59	25–9	17 – Onyiah	15 – Onyiah	3 – Twidale	Galen Center (6,865); Los Angeles, CA
*Non-conference game. ^{#}Rankings from AP Poll. (#) Tournament seedings in parentheses. S4=Spokane 4. All times are in Pacific Time.

== Rankings ==
Ranking movements Legend: ██ Increase in ranking ██ Decrease in ranking — = Not ranked RV = Received votes
	Week																				
Poll	Pre	1	2	3	4	5	6	7	8	9	10	11	12	13	14	15	16	17	18	19	Final
AP	—	—	—	—	—	RV	24	21	20	24	18	22	19	21	RV	RV	RV	RV	RV	RV	—
Coaches	RV	—	—	—	—	RV	RV	24	23	25	18	21	18	21	RV	RV	RV	RV	RV	RV	—
