= 2024–25 Georgia Tech Yellow Jackets women's basketball team =

Intercollegiate basketball season

2024–25 Georgia Tech Yellow Jackets women's basketball

NCAA tournament, First Round
- Conference: Atlantic Coast Conference
- Record: 22–11 (9–9 ACC)
- Head coach: Nell Fortner (6th season)
- Associate head coach: Blanche Alverson (6th season)
- Assistant coaches: LaSondra Barrett (3rd season); Michael Scruggs (2nd season); Caleb Currier (2nd season); Greg Callan (1st season)
- Home arena: McCamish Pavilion

2024–25 ACC women's basketball standings
	Conf.				Overall
Team	W		L	PCT	W		L	PCT
No. 9 NC State	16	–	2	.889	28	–	7	.800
No. 8 Notre Dame	16	–	2	.889	28	–	6	.824
No. 7 Duke †	14	–	4	.778	29	–	8	.784
No. 22 Florida State	13	–	5	.722	24	–	9	.727
No. 12 North Carolina	13	–	5	.722	29	–	8	.784
Louisville	13	–	5	.722	22	–	11	.667
California	12	–	6	.667	25	–	9	.735
Virginia Tech	9	–	9	.500	19	–	13	.594
Georgia Tech	9	–	9	.500	22	–	11	.667
Virginia	8	–	10	.444	17	–	15	.531
Stanford	8	–	10	.444	16	–	15	.516
Boston College	6	–	12	.333	16	–	18	.471
Syracuse	6	–	12	.333	12	–	18	.400
Clemson	6	–	12	.333	14	–	17	.452
Pittsburgh	5	–	13	.278	13	–	19	.406
Miami (FL)	4	–	14	.222	14	–	15	.483
Wake Forest	2	–	16	.111	9	–	20	.310
SMU	2	–	16	.111	10	–	20	.333
† 2025 ACC tournament winner Rankings from AP Poll

The 2024–25 Georgia Tech Yellow Jackets women's basketball team represented the Georgia Institute of Technology during the 2024–25 NCAA Division I women's basketball season. They were led by sixth-year head coach Nell Fortner and played their home games at McCamish Pavilion in Atlanta, Georgia as members of the Atlantic Coast Conference.

The Yellow Jackets started the season with four straight non-conference wins before traveling to Hawaii, to participate in the Hawaii North Shore Showcase. The highlight of their early season was a 83–67 victory over rival Georgia. The Yellow Jackets won both of their games in Hawaii, including a 74–58 defeat of twenty-first ranked Oregon. They returned to Atlanta to defeat Florida A&M 98–56 before winning their ACC–SEC Challenge game by three points over Mississippi State. After a win against Mercer, Georgia Tech entered the AP Poll at number twenty-five. Their biggest test of the season came in their ACC opener against fourteenth-ranked North Carolina. The Yellow Jackets won the game 82–76 and moved up to number seventeen in the rankings. A 72–61 defeat of twenty third-ranked Nebraska saw them move up to number thirteen in the rankings. They won two ACC games before their winning streak came to an end on January 9, 2025, against Virginia Tech. The 105–94 double-overtime loss ended a fifteen-game winning streak, where the Yellow Jackets had won thirteen games by double-digits. They lost the following two games to Louisville and third-ranked Notre Dame. The team went 6–2 over the next eight games, with losses against fourteenth-ranked Duke and Clemson. The Yellow Jackets fell out of the rankings and lost four straight games to end the season. The run included losses to thirteenth-ranked NC State and two losses against ACC newcomers California and Stanford during a California road trip.

The Yellow Jackets finished the season 22–11 overall and 9–9 in ACC play to finish in a tie for tenth place. As the ninth seed in the ACC tournament, they defeated eighth seed Virginia Tech, avenging their loss to end their regular season winning streak, in the Second Round. They lost to first seed and seventh ranked NC State in the Quarterfinals. They received an at-large invitation to the NCAA tournament and were the ninth-seed in the Spokane 1 region. They lost to eighth seed Richmond in the First Round to end their season.

After the season, head coach Nell Fortner announced her retirement after six years as head coach.

== Previous season ==
The Yellow Jackets finished the season 17–16 overall and 7–11 in ACC play to finish in a tie for tenth place. As the tenth seed in the ACC tournament, they defeated fifteenth seed Pittsburgh in the First Round before losing to seventh seed Duke in the Second Round. They received an at-large invitation to the WBIT. They were defeated by second seed Mississippi State in the First Round to end their season.

== Off-season ==
=== Departures ===
Departures
Name	Number	Pos.	Height	Year	Hometown	Reason for departure
Caitlyn Wilson	1	G	5'10"	Graduate Student	Cordova, Tennessee	Graduated
Anisa Clark	4	G	5'7"	Senior	McDonough, Georgia	Graduated
Aixa Wone Aranaz	11	F	6'3"	Graduate Student	Pamplona, Spain	Graduate
Jade Bediako	12	F/C	6'3"	Freshman	Brampton, Ontario	Transferred to Marquette
Avyonce Carter	15	G	5'10"	Senior	Norcross, Georgia	Transferred to Western Carolina
Sydney Johnson	21	G	5'9"	Graduate Student	Powder Springs, Georgia	Graduated

=== Incoming transfers ===
Incoming transfers
Name	Number	Pos.	Height	Year	Hometown	Previous school
Zoesha Smith	0	G/F	6'1"	Graduate Student	Brunswick, Georgia	Georgia

=== Recruiting class ===
College recruiting
Name	Hometown	School	Height	Weight	Commit date
Dani Carnegie; G	Mount Vernon, New York	Grayson	5 ft 9 in (1.75 m)	N/A	
Dani Carnegie; G	Recruit ratings: ESPN: (95)				
Gabbie Grooms; G	Sharpsburg, Georgia	Trinity Christian	5 ft 9 in (1.75 m)	N/A	
Gabbie Grooms; G	Recruit ratings: ESPN: (NR)				
Tianna Thompson; G	Mableton, Georgia	The Galloway School	5 ft 10 in (1.78 m)	N/A	
Tianna Thompson; G	Recruit ratings: ESPN: (92)				
Chazadi Wright; G	Atlanta, Georgia	Wesleyan School	5 ft 4 in (1.63 m)	N/A	
Chazadi Wright; G	Recruit ratings: ESPN: (94)				
Overall recruit ranking:
Note: In many cases, Scout, Rivals, 247Sports, On3, and ESPN may conflict in their listings of height and weight.; In these cases, the average was taken. ESPN grades are on a 100-point scale.; Sources:

== Roster ==
2024–25 Georgia Tech Yellow Jackets women's basketball team
Players
Coaches

Pos.	#	Name	Height	Year	Previous school	Hometown
G/F	0	Zoesha Smith	6 ft 1 in (1.85 m)	GS	Glynn Academy; Georgia	Brunswick, GA
G	1	Chazadi Wright	5 ft 4 in (1.63 m)	Fr	Wesleyan School	Atlanta, GA
G	3	Dani Carnegie	5 ft 9 in (1.75 m)	Fr	Grayson	Mount Vernon, NY
G	5	Tonie Morgan	5 ft 9 in (1.75 m)	Jr	Florida High	Tallahassee, FL
F	13	Kayla Blackshear	6 ft 1 in (1.85 m)	Sr	Lake Highland Preparatory School; Alabama	Orlando, FL
C	20	Ariadna Termis	6 ft 6 in (1.98 m)	So	IES Joaquín Blume	Zaragoza, Spain
G	22	Inés Noguero Outeiral	5 ft 9 in (1.75 m)	Jr	IES Joaquín Blume	Gijón, Spain
G	23	Rusne Augustinaite	6 ft 0 in (1.83 m)	So	Montverde Academy	Šiauliai, Lithuania
G	25	Kara Dunn	5 ft 11 in (1.8 m)	Jr	Mount Paran Christian	Dallas, GA
G	27	Gabbie Grooms	5 ft 9 in (1.75 m)	Fr	Trinity Christian	Sharpsburg, GA
G/F	32	D'Asia Thomas-Harris	6 ft 2 in (1.88 m)	So	Houston Christian	Katy, TX
G	35	Tianna Thompson	5 ft 10 in (1.78 m)	Fr	The Galloway School	Mableton, GA

Head coach

- Nell Fortner (Texas)

Assistant coach(es)

- Blanche Alverson (Auburn)
- LaSondra Barrett (LSU)
- Michael Scruggs (Tennessee)
- Caleb Currier (Tennessee)
- Greg Callan (Colorado)

Legend

- (C) Team captain
- (S) Suspended
- (I) Ineligible
- (W) Walk-on
- Injured
- Current redshirt

Roster
Last update: August 21, 2024

== Schedule ==
Date time, TV	Rank^{#}	Opponent^{#}	Result	Record	High points	High rebounds	High assists	Site (attendance) city, state
Exhibition
October 31, 2024*; 7:00 p.m.		Anderson	W 109–53	–	18 – Tied	7 – Termis	8 – Morgan	McCamish Pavilion (300); Atlanta, GA
Regular Season
November 4, 2024*; 10:30 a.m., ACCNX/ESPN+		Winthrop	W 85–39	1–0	17 – Carnegie	8 – Dunn	6 – Tied	McCamish Pavilion (3,611); Atlanta, GA
November 8, 2024*; 7:00 p.m., ACCNX/ESPN+		Georgia State	W 67–47	2–0	14 – Carnegie	13 – Dunn	4 – Wright	McCamish Pavilion (1,437); Atlanta, GA
November 14, 2024*; 7:00 p.m., ACCNX/ESPN+		West Georgia	W 88–53	3–0	15 – Carnegie	9 – Blackshear	5 – Wright	McCamish Pavilion (1,147); Atlanta, GA
November 17, 2024*; 2:00 p.m., ACCNX/ESPN+		Georgia; Rivalry	W 83–67	4–0	25 – Dunn	9 – Dunn	5 – Morgan	McCamish Pavilion (2,551); Atlanta, GA
November 23, 2024*; 9:00 p.m., BallerTV		vs. South Dakota State; Hawaii North Shore Showcase	W 71–57	5–0	21 – Morgan	10 – Smith	2 – Carnegie	George Q. Cannon Activities Center (425); Lāʻie, HI
November 25, 2024*; 7:00 p.m., BallerTV		vs. No. 21 Oregon; Hawaii North Shore Showcase	W 74–58	6–0	13 – Termis	12 – Dunn	7 – Noguero	George Q. Cannon Activities Center (1,800); Lāʻie, HI
December 1, 2024*; 2:00 p.m., ACCNX/ESPN+		Florida A&M	W 98–56	7–0	19 – Dunn	10 – Blackshear	7 – Morgan	McCamish Pavilion (1,468); Atlanta, GA
December 4, 2024*; 7:15 p.m., ACCN		Mississippi State; ACC–SEC Challenge	W 78–75	8–0	23 – Dunn	8 – Termis	8 – Morgan	McCamish Pavilion (1,514); Atlanta, GA
December 8, 2024*; 2:00 p.m., ESPN+		at Mercer	W 78–42	9–0	14 – Dunn	9 – Tied	4 – Tied	Hawkins Arena (519); Macon, GA
December 11, 2024*; 1:00 p.m., ACCNX/ESPN+	No. 25	Louisiana–Monroe	W 97–37	10–0	17 – Augustinaite	9 – Smith	8 – Morgan	McCamish Pavilion (1,075); Atlanta, GA
December 15, 2024; 2:00 p.m., ACCN	No. 25	at No. 14 North Carolina	W 82–76	11–0 (1–0)	23 – Morgan	9 – Carnegie	5 – Noguero	Carmichael Arena (2,381); Chapel Hill, NC
December 18, 2024*; 2:00 p.m., ACCNX/ESPN+	No. 17	Rice	W 88–57	12–0	23 – Augustinaite	11 – Smith	7 – Wright	McCamish Pavilion (1,212); Atlanta, GA
December 21, 2024*; 5:30 p.m., ACCNX/ESPN+	No. 17	No. 23 Nebraska	W 72–61	13–0	20 – Carnegie	14 – Dunn	4 – Tied	McCamish Pavilion (1,971); Atlanta, GA
December 29, 2024; 2:00 p.m., ACCNX/ESPN+	No. 13	Pittsburgh	W 100–61	14–0 (2–0)	28 – Dunn	7 – Dunn	8 – Morgan	McCamish Pavilion (2,151); Atlanta, GA
January 2, 2025; 7:00 p.m., ACCNX/ESPN+	No. 13	Syracuse	W 85–68	15–0 (3–0)	28 – Carnegie	12 – Smith	6 – Morgan	McCamish Pavilion (2,076); Atlanta, GA
January 9, 2025; 7:00 p.m., ACCNX/ESPN+	No. 13	Virginia Tech	L 94–105 ^{2OT}	15–1 (3–1)	33 – Dunn	10 – Dunn	5 – Termis	McCamish Pavilion (1,518); Atlanta, GA
January 12, 2025; 4:00 p.m., ACCN	No. 13	at Louisville	L 60–69	15–2 (3–2)	18 – Dunn	6 – Noguero	6 – Morgan	KFC Yum! Center (8,917); Louisville, KY
January 16, 2025; 6:00 p.m., ACCN	No. 17	at No. 3 Notre Dame	L 66–81	15–3 (3–3)	21 – Termis	6 – Dunn	5 – Wright	Purcell Pavilion (7,786); Notre Dame, IN
January 19, 2025; 2:00 p.m., ACCNX/ESPN+	No. 17	Clemson	W 89–65	16–3 (4–3)	20 – Dunn	12 – Morgan	14 – Morgan	McCamish Pavilion (6,386); Atlanta, GA
January 23, 2025; 7:00 p.m., ACCNX/ESPN+	No. 18	at Virginia	W 75–62	17–3 (5–3)	29 – Carnegie	10 – Blackshear	11 – Morgan	John Paul Jones Arena (4,022); Charlottesville, VA
January 26, 2025; 2:00 p.m., ACCNX/ESPN+	No. 18	No. 14 Duke	L 50–55	17–4 (5–4)	16 – Smith	13 – Smith	5 – Morgan	McCamish Pavilion (4,301); Atlanta, GA
February 2, 2025; 2:00 p.m., ACCN	No. 20	at Miami (FL)	W 77–66	18–4 (6–4)	16 – Tied	5 – Tied	6 – Morgan	Watsco Center (2,292); Coral Gables, FL
February 6, 2025; 7:00 p.m., ACCNX/ESPN+	No. 17	SMU	W 70–69	19–4 (7–4)	15 – Dunn	8 – Tied	4 – Tied	McCamish Pavilion (1,442); Atlanta, GA
February 9, 2025; 2:00 p.m., ACCNX/ESPN+	No. 17	at Boston College	W 71–51	20–4 (8–4)	23 – Dunn	11 – Smith	6 – Morgan	McCamish Pavilion (1,121); Atlanta, GA
February 13, 2025; 7:00 p.m., ACCNX/ESPN+	No. 19	at Clemson	L 61–68	20–5 (8–5)	18 – Dunn	12 – Smith	6 – Morgan	Littlejohn Coliseum (1,452); Clemson, SC
February 16, 2025; 12:00 p.m., ACCN	No. 19	Wake Forest	W 73–62	21–5 (9–5)	22 – Dunn	8 – Blackshear	6 – Morgan	McCamish Pavilion (2,568); Atlanta, GA
February 20, 2025; 7:00 p.m., ACCNX/ESPN+	No. 20	No. 13 NC State	L 68–83	21–6 (9–6)	17 – Morgan	9 – Blackshear	6 – Morgan	McCamish Pavilion (2,858); Atlanta, GA
February 23, 2025; 2:00 p.m., ACCNX/ESPN+	No. 20	Florida State	L 70–73	21–7 (9–7)	19 – Thompson	7 – Carnegie	6 – Smith	McCamish Pavilion (3,809); Atlanta, GA
February 27, 2025; 10:00 p.m., ACCNX/ESPN+		at California	L 65–79	21–8 (9–8)	18 – Dunn	6 – Tied	4 – Morgan	Haas Pavilion (1,933); Berkeley, CA
March 2, 2025; 5:00 p.m., ACCNX/ESPN+		at Stanford	L 82–87	21–9 (9–9)	31 – Morgan	7 – Tied	6 – Morgan	Maples Pavilion (4,400); Stanford, CA
ACC Women's Tournament
March 6, 2025; 1:30 p.m., ACCN	(9)	vs. (8) Virginia Tech; Second Round	W 72–57	22–9	19 – Morgan	9 – Tied	5 – Morgan	Greensboro Coliseum (11,203); Greensboro, NC
March 7, 2025; 1:30 p.m., ACCN	(9)	vs. (1) No. 7 NC State; Quarterfinals	L 72–73	22–10	21 – Tied	11 – Morgan	5 – Morgan	Greensboro Coliseum (16,416); Greensboro, NC
NCAA Women's Tournament
March 21, 2025*; 7:30 p.m., ESPNews	(9 S1)	vs. (8 S1) Richmond; Round of 64	L 49–74	22–11	12 – Morgan	9 – Blackshear	5 – Morgan	Pauley Pavilion (5,703); Los Angeles, CA
*Non-conference game. ^{#}Rankings from AP Poll. (#) Tournament seedings in parentheses. S1=Spokane 1. All times are in Eastern Time.

== Rankings ==
Ranking movements Legend: ██ Increase in ranking ██ Decrease in ranking — = Not ranked RV = Received votes
	Week																				
Poll	Pre	1	2	3	4	5	6	7	8	9	10	11	12	13	14	15	16	17	18	19	Final
AP	RV	—	—	—	RV	25	17	13	13	13	17	18	20	17	19	20	RV	RV	RV	RV	—
Coaches	—	—	—	RV	RV	RV	20	16	14	13	17	18	21	19	19	20	RV	—	—	—	—
