= 2025 ACC women's basketball tournament =

American college basketball competition

- 2025 ACC Tournament logo
- Classification: Division I
- Season: 2024–25
- Teams: 15
- Site: First Horizon Coliseum; Greensboro, North Carolina
- Champions: Duke (9th title)
- Winning coach: Kara Lawson (1st title)
- MVP: Oluchi Okananwa (Duke)
- Attendance: 70,204
- Television: ESPN, ESPN2, ACCN

2024–25 ACC women's basketball standings
| | Conf. | | | | Overall |
| Team | W | | L | PCT | W | | L | PCT |
|---|---|---|---|---|---|---|---|---|
| No. 9 NC State | 16 | – | 2 | .889 | 28 | – | 7 | .800 |
| No. 8 Notre Dame | 16 | – | 2 | .889 | 28 | – | 6 | .824 |
| No. 7 Duke † | 14 | – | 4 | .778 | 29 | – | 8 | .784 |
| No. 22 Florida State | 13 | – | 5 | .722 | 24 | – | 9 | .727 |
| No. 12 North Carolina | 13 | – | 5 | .722 | 29 | – | 8 | .784 |
| Louisville | 13 | – | 5 | .722 | 22 | – | 11 | .667 |
| California | 12 | – | 6 | .667 | 25 | – | 9 | .735 |
| Virginia Tech | 9 | – | 9 | .500 | 19 | – | 13 | .594 |
| Georgia Tech | 9 | – | 9 | .500 | 22 | – | 11 | .667 |
| Virginia | 8 | – | 10 | .444 | 17 | – | 15 | .531 |
| Stanford | 8 | – | 10 | .444 | 16 | – | 15 | .516 |
| Boston College | 6 | – | 12 | .333 | 16 | – | 18 | .471 |
| Syracuse | 6 | – | 12 | .333 | 12 | – | 18 | .400 |
| Clemson | 6 | – | 12 | .333 | 14 | – | 17 | .452 |
| Pittsburgh | 5 | – | 13 | .278 | 13 | – | 19 | .406 |
| Miami (FL) | 4 | – | 14 | .222 | 14 | – | 15 | .483 |
| Wake Forest | 2 | – | 16 | .111 | 9 | – | 20 | .310 |
| SMU | 2 | – | 16 | .111 | 10 | – | 20 | .333 |
† 2025 ACC tournament winner Rankings from AP Poll

The 2025 ACC women's basketball tournament was the postseason women's basketball tournament for the Atlantic Coast Conference held at the First Horizon Coliseum in Greensboro, North Carolina, from March 5 to 9, 2025. It was the 25th time in 26 years that the tournament was held in Greensboro. The tournament was sponsored by Ally Financial.

The Notre Dame Fighting Irish were the defending tournament champions. Notre Dame was the second overall seed after finishing tied for first place in the regular season rankings. However, they could not defend their title, losing to Duke in the Semifinals. Duke would go on to win the tournament over NC State 76–62. This was the second year in a row that NC State was defeated in the final. This was Duke's ninth overall ACC tournament title, and the first for head coach Kara Lawson. As tournament champions, Duke received the ACC's automatic bid to the 2025 NCAA Division I women's basketball tournament.

== Seeding and qualification ==
Fifteen of the eighteen ACC women's basketball teams will participate in the tournament. Teams were seeded by record within the conference, with a tiebreaker system to seed teams with identical conference records. The seeds were determined on March 2, after the final regular season conference games.

| Seed | School | Conference Record | Tiebreakers |
|---|---|---|---|
| 1 | NC State‡† | 16–2 | 1–0 vs. Notre Dame |
| 2 | Notre Dame‡† | 16–2 | 0–1 vs. NC State |
| 3 | Duke† | 14–4 | |
| 4 | Florida State† | 13–5 | 1–1 vs. Louisville & North Carolina; 1–1 vs. NC State & Notre Dame; 1–0 vs. North Carolina |
| 5 | North Carolina | 13–5 | 1–1 vs. Florida State & Louisville; 1–1 vs. NC State & Notre Dame; 0–1 vs. Florida State |
| 6 | Louisville | 13–5 | 1–1 vs. Florida State & North Carolina; 0–3 vs. NC State & Notre Dame |
| 7 | California | 12–6 | |
| 8 | Virginia Tech | 9–9 | 1–0 vs. Georgia Tech |
| 9 | Georgia Tech | 9–9 | 0–1 vs. Virginia Tech |
| 10 | Virginia | 8–10 | 1–0 vs. Stanford |
| 11 | Stanford | 8–10 | 0–1 vs. Virginia |
| 12 | Boston College | 6–12 | 2–1 vs. Syracuse & Clemson; 0–2 vs. NC State & Notre Dame; 0–1 vs. Duke; 0–3 vs. Florida State & North Carolina & Louisville; 0–1 vs. California; 1–1 vs. Virginia Tech & Georgia Tech; 1–1 vs. Virginia & Stanford |
| 13 | Syracuse | 6–12 | 2–1 vs. Boston College & Clemson; 0–2 vs. NC State & Notre Dame; 0–1 vs. Duke; 0–3 vs. Florida State & North Carolina & Louisville; 0–1 vs. California; 1–1 vs. Virginia Tech & Georgia Tech; 0–2 vs. Virginia & Stanford |
| 14 | Clemson | 6–12 | 0–2 vs. Boston College & Syracuse |
| 15 | Pittsburgh | 5–13 | |
| DNQ | Miami | 4–14 | |
| DNQ | Wake Forest | 2–16 | 1–0 vs. SMU |
| DNQ | SMU | 2–16 | 0–1 vs. Wake Forest |
‡ – ACC regular season champions. † – Received a double-bye in the conference tournament. # – Received a single-bye in the conference tournament.

== Schedule ==
| Session | Game | Time | Matchup | Score | Television | Attendance |
First round – Wednesday, March 5
| Opening day | 1 | 1:00 p.m. | No. 12 Boston College vs. No. 13 Syracuse | 76–73 | ACCN | 6,932 |
| Opening day | 2 | 3:30 p.m. | No. 10 Virginia vs. No. 15 Pittsburgh | 64–50 | ACCN | 6,932 |
| Opening day | 3 | 6:30 p.m. | No. 11 Stanford vs. No. 14 Clemson | 46–63 | ACCN | 6,932 |
Second round – Thursday, March 6
| 1 | 4 | 11:00 a.m. | No. 5 North Carolina vs. No. 12 Boston College | 78–71 | ACCN | 11,203 |
| 1 | 5 | 1:30 p.m. | No. 8 Virginia Tech vs. No. 9 Georgia Tech | 57–72 | ACCN | 11,203 |
| 2 | 6 | 5:00 p.m. | No. 7 California vs. No. 10 Virginia | 75–58 | ACCN | 5,828 |
| 2 | 7 | 7:30 p.m. | No. 6 Louisville vs. No. 14 Clemson | 70–68^{OT} | ACCN | 5,828 |
Quarterfinals – Friday, March 7
| 3 | 8 | 11:00 a.m. | No. 4 Florida State vs. No. 5 North Carolina | 56–60 | ESPN2 | 16,416 |
| 3 | 9 | 1:30 p.m. | No. 1 NC State vs. No. 9 Georgia Tech | 73–72 | ACCN | 16,416 |
| 4 | 10 | 5:00 p.m. | No. 2 Notre Dame vs. No. 7 California | 73–64 | ESPN2 | 7,108 |
| 4 | 11 | 7:30 p.m. | No. 3 Duke vs. No. 6 Louisville | 61–48 | ACCN | 7,108 |
Semifinals – Saturday, March 8
| 5 | 12 | 12:00 p.m. | No. 1 NC State vs. No. 5 North Carolina | 66–55 | ESPN2 | 10,894 |
| 5 | 13 | 2:30 p.m. | No. 2 Notre Dame vs. No. 3 Duke | 56–61 | ESPN2 | 10,894 |
Championship – Sunday, March 9
| 6 | 14 | 1:00 p.m. | No. 1 NC State vs. No. 3 Duke | 62–76 | ESPN | 11,823 |
Game times in EST through the semifinals and EDT for the championship. Rankings denote tournament seed.

== Bracket ==
First round Wednesday, March 5
12 | Boston College | 76
13 | Syracuse | 73
10 | Virginia | 64
15 | Pittsburgh | 50
11 | Stanford | 46
14 | Clemson | 63

Second round Thursday, March 6
8 | Virginia Tech | 57
9 | Georgia Tech | 72
5 | 14 North Carolina | 78
12 | Boston College | 71
7 | California | 75
10 | Virginia | 58
6 | Louisville | 70*
14 | Clemson | 68

Quarterfinals; Friday, March 7
1 | 7 NC State | 73
9 | Georgia Tech | 72
4 | 22 Florida State | 56
5 | 14 North Carolina | 60
2 | 6 Notre Dame | 73
7 | California | 64
3 | 11 Duke | 61
6 | Louisville | 48

Semifinals; Saturday, March 8
1 | 7 NC State | 66
5 | 14 North Carolina | 55
2 | 6 Notre Dame | 56
3 | 11 Duke | 61

Championship; Sunday, March 9
1 | 7 NC State | 62
3 | 11 Duke | 76

* denotes overtime period

== Game summaries ==
=== First round ===
ACCN

March 5
1:00 p.m.

Report

No. 12 Boston College 76, No. 13 Syracuse 73
Scoring by quarter: 14–27, 14–18, 28–15, 20–13
| Pts: Waggoner (32); Rebs: Sidberry (17); Asts: Daley (3) | Pts: Burrows (23); Rebs: Wilson, Wood (5); Asts: Woolley (6) |

First Horizon Coliseum
Greensboro, NC
Referees: Ed Sidlasky
Denise Brooks
Pualani Spurlock

ACCN

March 5
3:30 p.m.

Report

No. 10 Virginia 64, No. 15 Pittsburgh 50
Scoring by quarter: 14–12, 12–10, 22–14, 16–14
| Pts: Johnson (17); Rebs: Lattimore (11); Asts: Johnson (7) | Pts: Faye (15); Rebs: Faye (11); Asts: Miles (4) |

First Horizon Coliseum
Greensboro, NC
Referees: Billy Smith
Chuck Gonzalez
Ashley Gloss

ACCN

March 5
6:30 p.m.

Report

No. 11 Stanford 46, No. 14 Clemson 63
Scoring by quarter: 10–11, 6–16, 14–21, 16–15
| Pts: Ogden (13); Rebs: Bosgana (9); Asts: Ogden, Stevenson (2) | Pts: McQueen (17); Rebs: McQueen, Poole (8); Asts: McQueen (6) |

First Horizon Coliseum
Greensboro, NC
Attendance: 6,932
Referees: Tiffany Bird
Eric Brewton
Saif Esho

=== Second round ===
ACCN

March 6
11:00 a.m.

Report

No. 5 North Carolina 78, No. 12 Boston College 71
Scoring by quarter: 18–14, 18–16, 18–24, 24–17
| Pts: Donarski (20); Rebs: Gakdeng (8); Asts: Nivar (5) | Pts: Greene (18); Rebs: Waggoner (8); Asts: Ivey (5) |

First Horizon Coliseum
Greensboro, NC
Referees: Meadow Overstreet
Billy Smith
Fatou Cissoko-Stephens

ACCN

March 6
1:30 p.m.

Report

No. 8 Virginia Tech 57, No. 9 Georgia Tech 72
Scoring by quarter: 13–14, 19–18, 11–16, 14–24
| Pts: Micheaux (19); Rebs: Micheaux (6); Asts: Wenzel (4) | Pts: Morgan (19); Rebs: Blackshear, Carnegie, Dunn (9); Asts: Morgan (5) |

First Horizon Coliseum
Greensboro, NC
Attendance: 11,203
Referees: Eric Brewton
Joseph Vaszily
Tiffany Bird

ACCN

March 6
5:00 p.m.

Report

No. 7 California 75, No. 10 Virginia 58
Scoring by quarter: 24–13, 17–12, 21–14, 13–19
| Pts: Onyiah, Suárez, Twidale (16); Rebs: Onyiah, Suarez (10); Asts: Krimili, Noble, Suárez, Twidale (4) | Pts: Johnson (18); Rebs: Johnson (8); Asts: Clark (4) |

First Horizon Coliseum
Greensboro, NC
Referees: Denise Brooks
Rod Creech
Saif Esho

ACCN

March 6
7:30 p.m.

Report

No. 6 Louisville 70, No. 14 Clemson 68 (OT)
Scoring by quarter: 11–13, 19–16, 13–18, 17–13, Overtime: 10–8
| Pts: Roberts, Williams (16); Rebs: Williams (12); Asts: Roberts (3) | Pts: Kohn (14); Rebs: Moore (6); Asts: McQueen (6) |

First Horizon Coliseum
Greensboro, NC
Attendance: 5,828
Referees: Pualani Spurlock
Chuck Gonzalez
Teresa Stuck

=== Quarterfinals ===
ESPN2

March 7
11:00 a.m.

Report

No. 4 Florida State 56, No. 5 North Carolina 60
Scoring by quarter: 12–22, 19–5, 11–19, 14–14
| Pts: Timpson (15); Rebs: Timpson (8); Asts: Latson (5) | Pts: Donarski, Ustby (12); Rebs: Ustby (18); Asts: Ustby (5) |

First Horizon Coliseum
Greensboro, NC
Referees: Dee Kantner
Angelica Suffren
Rod Creech

ACCN

March 7
1:30 p.m.

Report

No. 1 NC State 73, No. 9 Georgia Tech 72
Scoring by quarter: 18–23, 20–14, 15–15, 20–20
| Pts: James (16); Rebs: Brooks (9); Asts: Brooks (4) | Pts: Dunn, Morgan (21); Rebs: Morgan (11); Asts: Morgan (5) |

First Horizon Coliseum
Greensboro, NC
Attendance: 16,416
Referees: Saif Esho
Tiara Cruse
Karen Preato

ESPN2

March 7
5:00 p.m.

Report

No. 2 Notre Dame 73, No. 7 California 64
Scoring by quarter: 16–10, 15–18, 24–22, 18–14
| Pts: Hidalgo (25); Rebs: King, Westbeld (5); Asts: Miles (6) | Pts: Twidale (16); Rebs: Suárez (11); Asts: Krimili (4) |

First Horizon Coliseum
Greensboro, NC
Referees: Joe Vaszily
Fatou Cissoko-Stephens
Talisa Green

ACCN

March 7
7:30 p.m.

Report

No. 3 Duke 61, No. 6 Louisville 48
Scoring by quarter: 15–11, 16–7, 14–12, 16–18
| Pts: Okananwa (13); Rebs: Fournier (8); Asts: Mair (4) | Pts: Randolph (13); Rebs: Cochran (11); Asts: Williams (3) |

First Horizon Coliseum
Greensboro, NC
Attendance: 7,108
Referees: Maj Forsberg
Katie Lukanich
Mark Resch

=== Semifinals ===
ESPN2

March 8
12:00 p.m.

Report

No. 1 NC State 66, No. 5 North Carolina 55
Scoring by quarter: 16–5, 17–21, 21–11, 12–18
| Pts: James (19); Rebs: James (9); Asts: 5 players (2) | Pts: Nivar (13); Rebs: Gakdeng (10); Asts: Townsend (4) |

First Horizon Coliseum
Greensboro, NC
Referees: Maj Forsberg
Katie Lukanich
Talisa Green

ESPN2

March 8
2:30 p.m.

Report

No. 2 Notre Dame 56, No. 3 Duke 59
Scoring by quarter: 17–16, 14–13, 11–18, 14–14
| Pts: Hidalgo (23); Rebs: Karlen (5); Asts: Hidalgo/Miles (3) | Pts: Okananwa (14); Rebs: Okananwa/Thomas (7); Asts: Jackson/Okananwa/Richardson (3) |

First Horizon Coliseum
Greensboro, NC
Attendance: 10,894
Referees: Dee Kantner
Angelica Suffren
Karen Preato

=== Final ===
ESPN

March 9
1:00 p.m.

Report

No. 1 NC State 62, No. 3 Duke 76
Scoring by quarter: 19–10, 17–19, 16–23, 10–24
| Pts: James (18); Rebs: Trygger (7); Asts: Rivers (4) | Pts: Jackson/Okananwa (22); Rebs: Okananwa (10); Asts: Okananwa/Richardson (4) |

First Horizon Coliseum
Greensboro, NC
Attendance: 11,823
Referees: Tiara Cruse
Pualani Spurlock
Joe Vaszily

== Awards and honors ==
**2025 ACC Women's Basketball All-Tournament Teams**
| First Team | Second Team |
| Zoe Brooks – NC State; Ashlon Jackson – Duke; Aziaha James – NC State; **Oluchi Okananwa** – Duke; Saniya Rivers – NC State | Madison Hayes – NC State; Hannah Hidalgo – Notre Dame; Olivia Miles – Notre Dame; Marta Suárez – California; Makayla Timpson – Florida State |

MVP in bold

== See also ==
2025 ACC men's basketball tournament
