= 2024–25 Miami Hurricanes women's basketball team =

Intercollegiate basketball season

2024–25 Miami Hurricanes women's basketball
- Conference: Atlantic Coast Conference
- Record: 14–15 (4–14 ACC)
- Head coach: Tricia Cullop (1st season)
- Associate head coach: Fitzroy Anthony; Jessie Ivey (10th 1st season)
- Assistant coaches: Danielle Page (1st season); Murriel Page (1st season)
- Home arena: Watsco Center

2024–25 ACC women's basketball standings
	Conf.				Overall
Team	W		L	PCT	W		L	PCT
No. 9 NC State	16	–	2	.889	28	–	7	.800
No. 8 Notre Dame	16	–	2	.889	28	–	6	.824
No. 7 Duke †	14	–	4	.778	29	–	8	.784
No. 22 Florida State	13	–	5	.722	24	–	9	.727
No. 12 North Carolina	13	–	5	.722	29	–	8	.784
Louisville	13	–	5	.722	22	–	11	.667
California	12	–	6	.667	25	–	9	.735
Virginia Tech	9	–	9	.500	19	–	13	.594
Georgia Tech	9	–	9	.500	22	–	11	.667
Virginia	8	–	10	.444	17	–	15	.531
Stanford	8	–	10	.444	16	–	15	.516
Boston College	6	–	12	.333	16	–	18	.471
Syracuse	6	–	12	.333	12	–	18	.400
Clemson	6	–	12	.333	14	–	17	.452
Pittsburgh	5	–	13	.278	13	–	19	.406
Miami (FL)	4	–	14	.222	14	–	15	.483
Wake Forest	2	–	16	.111	9	–	20	.310
SMU	2	–	16	.111	10	–	20	.333
† 2025 ACC tournament winner Rankings from AP Poll

The 2024–25 Miami Hurricanes women's basketball team represented the University of Miami during the 2024–25 NCAA Division I women's basketball season. The Hurricanes were led by first-year head coach Tricia Cullop and played their home games at the Watsco Center in Coral Gables, Florida as members of the Atlantic Coast Conference (ACC). Cullop replaced nineteenth-year head coach Katie Meier who announced her retirement on March 22, 2024.

The Hurricanes started the season well, reeling off seven straight victories to start the season. The highlight of the run was an away win over rival Florida 79–51. This run included two victories in the Miami Thanksgiving Tournament. Their winning streak was broken on December 4 in the ACC–SEC Challenge when they lost to Vanderbilt 70–88. The Hurricanes went on another four game winning streak from there, including winning their first ACC game against Pittsburgh, 62–52. They also recorded neutral site wins over Nevada and Oregon State in the Maui Classic. The turn of the year saw the team enter a rough patch as they lost their next seven straight games. The run included only one loss to a ranked team, number 17 North Carolina. The run ended on January 26 with a 70–63 win over SMU. The Hurricanes followed that with another win, 77–74 against Virginia. However they could not build on that streak, and lost all five of their next games, all against ranked opponents. They defeated Wake Forest 62–60 before losing their final two games on a road trip to California.

The Hurricanes finished the season 14–15 and 4–14 in ACC play to finish in sixteenth place. Under the new ACC tournament rules, they did not qualify for the 2025 ACC tournament. They were not invited to the NCAA tournament or the WBIT.

== Previous season ==
The Hurricanes finished the 2023–24 season 19–12 overall and 8–10 in ACC play to finish in ninth place. As the ninth seed in the ACC tournament, they defeated eighth seed North Carolina in the second round before losing to first-seeded Virginia Tech in the quarterfinals. On Selection Sunday, the Hurricanes were not picked to be a part of the field for the 2024 NCAA tournament, and were left out by the selection committee. The team declined an invite to the inaugural WBIT, ending their season.

== Off-season ==
=== Departures ===
Departures
Name	Number	Pos.	Height	Year	Hometown	Reason for departure
Jaida Patrick	5	G	5' 10"	Graduate student	West Haverstraw, NY	Graduated
Ja'Leah Williams	12	G	5' 9"	Junior	Pompano Beach, FL	Transferred to Louisville
Lashae Dwyer	13	G	5' 6"	Junior	Toronto, ON	Transferred to St. John's
Ally Stedman	21	G	5' 9"	Junior	Phoenix, AZ	Transferred to UCF
Shayeann Day-Wilson	30	G	5' 6"	Junior	Toronto, ON	Transferred to LSU
Lazaria Spearman	32	F	6' 4"	Sophomore	Dacula, GA	Transferred to Tennessee
Latasha Lattimore	35	F	6' 4"	Junior	Toronto, ON	Transferred to Virginia
Kyla Oldacre	44	F	6' 6"	Sophomore	Mason, OH	Transferred to Texas

=== Incoming transfers ===
Incoming transfers
Name	Number	Pos.	Height	Year	Hometown	Previous school
Darrione Rogers	8	G	5' 11"	Graduate student	Chicago, IL	Mississippi State
Haley Cavinder	14	G	5' 6"	Graduate student	Gilbert, AZ	No team
Hanna Cavinder	15	G	5' 6"	Graduate student	Gilbert, AZ	No team
Daniela Abies	16	F	6' 0"	Junior	Málaga, Spain	Wichita State
Natalija Marshall	21	F	6' 5"	Graduate student	Queens, NY	Notre Dame
Cameron Williams	44	F	6' 3"	Graduate student	Chicago, IL	Michigan

=== Recruiting class ===
College recruiting information
Name	Hometown	School	Height	Weight	Commit date
Ahnay Adams; PG	New Bedford, MA	Tilton School	5 ft 6 in (1.68 m)	N/A	Nov 8, 2023
Ahnay Adams; PG	Recruit ratings: ESPN: (95)				
Leah Harmon; PG	Paterson, NJ	IMG Academy	5 ft 6 in (1.68 m)	N/A	Nov 8, 2023
Leah Harmon; PG	Recruit ratings: ESPN: (95)				
Simone Pelish; G	Poughkeepsie, NY	Our Lady of Lourdes	6 ft 0 in (1.83 m)	N/A	Jun 24, 2023
Simone Pelish; G	Recruit ratings: ESPN: (91)				
Overall recruit ranking:
Note: In many cases, Scout, Rivals, 247Sports, On3, and ESPN may conflict in their listings of height and weight.; In these cases, the average was taken. ESPN grades are on a 100-point scale.; Sources:

== Roster ==
2024–25 Miami Hurricanes women's basketball team
Players
Coaches

Pos.	#	Name	Height	Year	Previous school	Hometown
F	0	Aurora Almón	6 ft 4 in (1.93 m)	RS Fr	The Webb Schools	Santo Domingo, Dominican Republic
G	1	Lemyah Hylton	5 ft 11 in (1.8 m)	Jr	Southwest Academy Girls Prep; Arizona	London, ON
G	4	Jasmyne Roberts	5 ft 10 in (1.78 m)	Sr	Bishop Kenny	Jacksonville, FL
G	5	Ahnay Adams	5 ft 6 in (1.68 m)	Fr	Tilton School	New Bedford, MA
G	8	Darrione Rogers	5 ft 11 in (1.8 m)	GS	Lake Park; Mississippi State	Chicago, IL
G	14	Haley Cavinder	5 ft 6 in (1.68 m)	GS	Gilbert; Fresno State	Gilbert, AZ
G	15	Hanna Cavinder	5 ft 6 in (1.68 m)	GS	Gilbert; Fresno State	Gilbert, AZ
F	16	Daniela Abies	6 ft 0 in (1.83 m)	Jr	Salesianos San Bartolomé; Wichita State	Málaga, Spain
F	21	Natalija Marshall	6 ft 5 in (1.96 m)	GS	Christ the King; Notre Dame	Queens, NY
G	22	Simone Pelish	6 ft 0 in (1.83 m)	Fr	Our Lady of Lourdes	Poughkeepsie, NY
G	42	Leah Harmon	5 ft 6 in (1.68 m)	Fr	IMG Academy	Paterson, NJ
F	44	Cameron Williams	6 ft 3 in (1.91 m)	GS	Whitney Young; Michigan	Chicago, IL
F	54	Sophia Zulich	5 ft 11 in (1.8 m)	GS	Crestwood Prep; Denver	Greater Sudbury, ON

Head coach

- Tricia Cullop (Purdue)

Assistant coach(es)

- Fitzroy Anthony (Palm Beach Atlantic)
- Jessie Ivey (West Florida)
- Danielle Page (Nebraska)
- Murriel Page (Florida)

Legend

- (C) Team captain
- (S) Suspended
- (I) Ineligible
- (W) Walk-on
- Injured
- Current redshirt

Roster
Last update: August 23, 2024

== Schedule ==
Date time, TV	Rank^{#}	Opponent^{#}	Result	Record	High points	High rebounds	High assists	Site (attendance) city, state
Exhibition
October 27, 2024*; 2:00 p.m.		Palm Beach Atlantic	W 89–30	—	13 – Tied	10 – Hal. Cavinder	5 – Rogers	Watsco Center; Coral Gables, FL
Regular season
November 4, 2024*; 11:00 a.m., ACCNX		Stetson	W 78–53	1–0	16 – Roberts	12 – Marshall	5 – Han. Cavinder	Watsco Center (5,532); Coral Gables, FL
November 11, 2024*; 7:00 p.m., ACCNX		Jacksonville	W 74–71	2–0	24 – Marshall	6 – Marshall	7 – Han. Cavinder	Watsco Center (1,907); Coral Gables, FL
November 16, 2024*; 12:00 p.m., SECN+		at Florida	W 83–73	3–0	31 – Hal. Cavinder	6 – Tied	5 – Tied	O'Connell Center (1,724); Gainesville, FL
November 19, 2024*; 7:00 p.m., ACCNX		FIU	W 79–51	4–0	12 – Rogers	8 – Roberts	6 – Hal. Cavinder	Watsco Center (2,270); Coral Gables, FL
November 22, 2024*; 5:00 p.m., ACCNX		Campbell	W 71–66	5–0	20 – Williams	7 – Tied	5 – Hal. Cavinder	Watsco Center (2,259); Coral Gables, FL
November 29, 2024*; 12:00 p.m., ACCNX		Charlotte; Miami Thanksgiving Tournament	W 79–63	6–0	22 – Williams	10 – Tied	9 – Han. Cavinder	Watsco Center (2,205); Coral Gables, FL
December 1, 2024*; 2:30 p.m., ACCNX		Quinnipiac; Miami Thanksgiving Tournament	W 83–74	7–0	30 – Hal. Cavinder	9 – Williams	9 – Hal. Cavinder	Watsco Center (2,080); Coral Gables, FL
December 4, 2024*; 5:00 p.m., ACCN		Vanderbilt; ACC–SEC Challenge	L 70–88	7–1	19 – Roberts	5 – Williams	5 – Hal. Cavinder	Watsco Center (2,107); Coral Gables, FL
December 8, 2024*; 2:00 p.m., ACCNX		Bethune–Cookman	W 81–63	8–1	20 – Marshall	10 – Williams	6 – Roberts	Watsco Center (2,735); Coral Gables, FL
December 15, 2024; 12:00 p.m., ACCN		at Pittsburgh	W 62–52	9–1 (1–0)	22 – Hal. Cavinder	11 – Hal. Cavinder	6 – Han. Cavinder	Peterson Events Center (340); Pittsburgh, PA
December 20, 2024*; 1:30 a.m.		vs. Nevada; Maui Classic	W 84–53	10–1	25 – Hal. Cavinder	12 – Hal. Cavinder	7 – Hal. Cavinder	Seabury Hall (1,007); Makawao, HI
December 21, 2024*; 12:00 a.m.		vs. Oregon State; Maui Classic	W 61–56	11–1	21 – Williams	12 – Hal. Cavinder	5 – Hal. Cavinder	Seabury Hall (1,206); Makawao, HI
December 29, 2024; 4:00 p.m., ACCN		No. 17 North Carolina	L 60–69	11–2 (1–1)	19 – Tied	11 – Hal. Cavinder	5 – Hal. Cavinder	Watsco Center (3,397); Coral Gables, FL
January 2, 2025; 7:00 p.m., ACCNX		at Louisville	L 56–74	11–3 (1–2)	19 – Hal. Cavinder	9 – Williams	2 – Tied	KFC Yum! Center (7,956); Louisville, KY
January 5, 2025; 12:00 p.m., ACCNX		Virginia Tech	L 64–68	11–4 (1–3)	15 – Williams	10 – Williams	6 – Hal. Cavinder	Watsco Center (2,553); Coral Gables, FL
January 12, 2025; 6:00 p.m., ACCN		at Syracuse	L 61–66	11–5 (1–4)	23 – Rogers	11 – Hal. Cavinder	6 – Han. Cavinder	JMA Wireless Dome (3,185); Syracuse, NY
January 16, 2025; 7:00 p.m., ACCNX		Boston College	L 79–83	11–6 (1–5)	16 – Roberts	6 – Almón	8 – Han. Cavinder	Watsco Center (1,925); Coral Gables, FL
January 19, 2025; 2:00 p.m., ACCNX		at Florida State	L 66–88	11–7 (1–6)	16 – Roberts	7 – Almón	5 – Hal. Cavinder	Donald L. Tucker Center (2,631); Tallahassee, FL
January 23, 2025; 7:00 p.m., ACCNX		at Clemson	L 61–64	11–8 (1–7)	18 – Hal. Cavinder	5 – Tied	6 – Han. Cavinder	Littlejohn Coliseum (2,183); Clemson, SC
January 26, 2025; 12:00 p.m., ACCNX		SMU	W 70–63	12–8 (2–7)	32 – Hal. Cavinder	8 – Tied	8 – Han. Cavinder	Watsco Center (2,858); Coral Gables, FL
January 30, 2025; 7:00 p.m., ACCNX		Virginia	W 77–74	13–8 (3–7)	22 – Hal. Cavinder	14 – Williams	10 – Hal. Cavinder	Watsco Center (1,925); Coral Gables, FL
February 2, 2025; 2:00 p.m., ACCN		No. 20 Georgia Tech	L 66–77	13–9 (3–8)	25 – Hal. Cavinder	16 – Williams	5 – Han. Cavinder	Watsco Center (2,292); Coral Gables, FL
February 9, 2025; 2:00 p.m., ACCNX		at No. 10 Duke	L 49–90	13–10 (3–9)	14 – Williams	9 – Williams	1 – Tied	Cameron Indoor Stadium (3,003); Durham, NC
February 13, 2025; 6:00 p.m., ACCN		at No. 10 NC State	L 74–76	13–11 (3–10)	20 – Hal. Cavinder	8 – Hal. Cavinder	6 – Hal. Cavinder	Reynolds Coliseum (5,500); Raleigh, NC
February 16, 2025; 2:00 p.m., The CW		No. 23 Florida State; Rivalry	L 82–83	13–12 (3–11)	27 – Hal. Cavinder	8 – Hal. Cavinder	7 – Hal. Cavinder	Watsco Center (3,477); Coral Gables, FL
February 20, 2025; 7:00 p.m., ACCNX		No. 1 Notre Dame	L 42–82	13–13 (3–12)	12 – Williams	10 – Williams	4 – Roberts	Watsco Center (4,614); Coral Gables, FL
February 23, 2025; 12:00 p.m., ACCN		Wake Forest	W 62–60	14–13 (4–12)	23 – Williams	11 – Williams	4 – Hal. Cavinder	Watsco Center (2,788); Coral Gables, FL
February 27, 2025; 10:00 p.m., ACCNX		at Stanford	L 69–86	14–14 (4–13)	19 – Han. Cavinder	4 – Tied	7 – Hal. Cavinder	Maples Pavilion (3,309); Stanford, CA
March 2, 2025; 5:00 p.m., ACCNX		at California	L 63–82	14–15 (4–14)	16 – Hal. Cavinder	5 – Han. Cavinder	5 – Han. Cavinder	Haas Pavilion (3,295); Berkeley, CA
*Non-conference game. ^{#}Rankings from AP poll. (#) Tournament seedings in parentheses. All times are in Eastern.

== Rankings ==
Ranking movements Legend: ██ Increase in ranking ██ Decrease in ranking — = Not ranked RV = Received votes
	Week																				
Poll	Pre	1	2	3	4	5	6	7	8	9	10	11	12	13	14	15	16	17	18	19	Final
AP	RV	RV	RV	RV	—	—	—	—	—	—	—	—	—	—	—	—	—	—	—	—	
Coaches	RV	—	—	—	—	—	—	—	—	—	—	—	—	—	—	—	—	—	—	—	

Legend
	Increase in ranking
	Decrease in ranking
	Not ranked previous week
(RV)	Received votes
