= Alyssa Ustby =

American basketball player (born 2002)

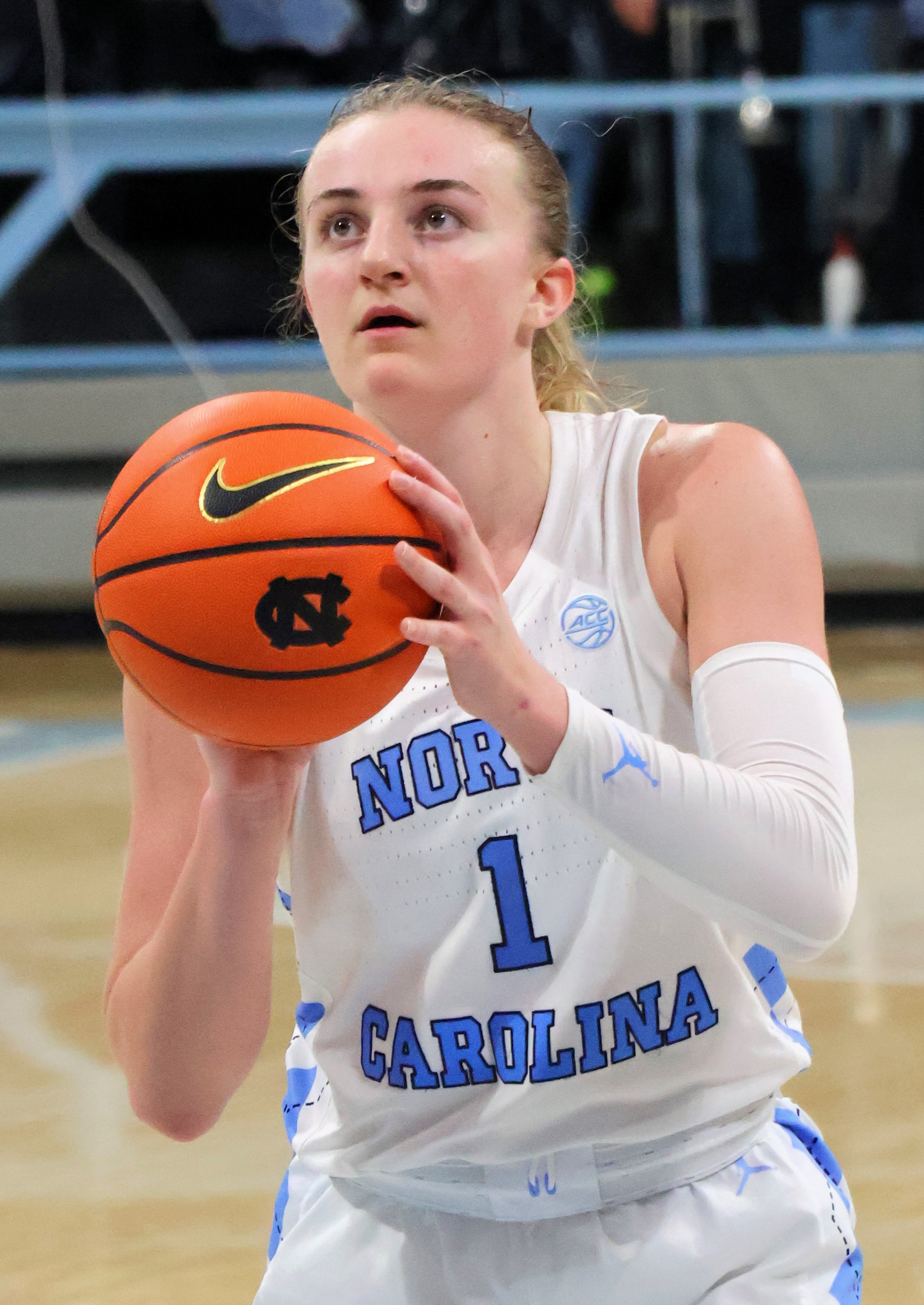
- Ustby with North Carolina in 2024

Reyer Venezia
- Position: Guard / forward
- League: Serie A1

Personal information
- Born: March 18, 2002 (age 24) Rochester, Minnesota, U.S.
- Listed height: 6 ft 2 in (1.88 m)

Career information
- High school: Lourdes High School (Rochester, Minnesota)
- College: North Carolina (2020–2025)
- WNBA draft: 2025: undrafted
- Playing career: 2025–present

Career history
- 2025–2026: Panthers Roseto
- 2026–: Reyer Venezia

Career highlights
- Eurobasket.com Serie A Player of the Year (2026); 2× First-team All-ACC (2023, 2025); 2× Second-team All-ACC (2022, 2024)
- Stats at Basketball Reference

Alyssa Anne Ustby (/ˈʌsbi/ US-bee; born March 18, 2002) is an American professional basketball player for Reyer Venezia of the Lega Basket Femminile and the EuroLeague Women. She played college basketball for the North Carolina Tar Heels, setting the program record for career rebounds and recording the first triple-double in program history. She began her professional career with Panthers Roseto in 2025, leading the Italian league in scoring in her rookie season.

== Early life and high school career ==
Ustby was raised in Rochester, Minnesota, the daughter of Todd and Lisa Ustby, and has three older brothers. She began playing basketball in second grade after having gone to her brothers' practices. She attended Lourdes High School, where she was named all-state three times and set school records in career points (2,560) and rebounds (1,287). In her senior year, she was nominated for Minnesota Miss Basketball and the McDonald's All-American Game. She starred in two other high school sports: she set the school softball record for career stolen bases and led the team to the state championship as a junior, and she led the school soccer team in scoring as a senior with 14 goals. She was a three-star recruit when she committed to the University of North Carolina. Head coach Courtney Banghart said she was "totally underrated, but I saw a high-motor, competitive and versatile athlete who had incredible footwork". Ustby's parents moved to Durham, North Carolina, to be able to watch their daughter play.

== College career ==
=== Freshman season (2020–21) ===
Ustby debuted for the North Carolina Tar Heels on November 25, 2020, scoring 13 points in a 90–61 win over Radford. She recorded her first double-double with 15 points and 11 rebounds off the bench in a 95–70 win over High Point on November 29. She made her first start on December 17 in a 92–68 win over Syracuse, after which she held a starting position for the rest of her career. She shot 4-for-4 from three and posted 20 points and 12 rebounds in a 76–69 win over NC State on February 7, 2021. She led the team in scoring with a career-high 23 points in an 82–71 loss to Wake Forest in the ACC tournament second round on March 4. She scored 7 points and grabbed 5 rebounds for No. 10–seeded North Carolina in an 80–71 loss to No. 7 Alabama in the first round of the NCAA tournament. Ustby played a team high in minutes in her freshman season, averaging 9.9 points and 5.7 rebounds per game.

=== Sophomore season (2021–22) ===
Ustby tied her career high with 23 points and grabbed 12 rebounds in a 72–59 win over VCU in the Bahamas on November 26, 2021. She scored 12 points with 12 rebounds for No. 5 seed North Carolina in a 63–45 win over No. 4 Arizona in the second round of the NCAA tournament. In the next round, she scored only 4 points with 7 rebounds in a 61–69 loss to eventual champions No. 1 South Carolina. She averaged 12.9 points and a team-high 8.6 rebounds per game in her sophomore 2021–22 season, earning second-team All-ACC honors. Her season total of 13 double-doubles was the second most in the ACC.

=== Junior season (2022–23) ===
Ustby grabbed a career-high 18 rebounds and scored 9 points in a 56–47 win over NC State on January 15, 2023. On March 18, she scored her 1000th career point for No. 6 seed North Carolina in a 61–59 win over No. 11 St. John's in the first round of the NCAA tournament. In the second round, she scored 16 points with 9 rebounds in a 71–69 loss to No. 3 Ohio State. She averaged 13.2 points and a team-high 8.3 rebounds per game in her junior 2022–23 season, earning first-team All-ACC honors.

=== Senior season (2023–24) ===
Ustby held a three-day girls' basketball camp in her hometown of Rochester, Minnesota, before the 2023–24 season, a year when she became one of the team's captains. On January 4, 2024, she became the first player in program history to record a triple-double when she posted 16 points, 16 rebounds, and 10 assists in a 75–51 win over Syracuse. On February 18, she set a new career high with 25 points and added 10 rebounds in a 58–50 win over Wake Forest. She scored 16 points and grabbed a career-high 17 rebounds for No. 8 seed North Carolina in a 59–56 win over No. 9 Michigan State in the first round of the NCAA tournament. In the second round, she shot 4-for-16 yet was her team's top scorer with 12 points in an 88–41 blowout loss to eventual champions No. 1 South Carolina. She averaged 12.5 points, a team-high 9.5 rebounds, and a team-high 3.6 assists in her senior 2023–24 season, earning second-team All-ACC honors. After the season, she announced that she would return to North Carolina for a fifth and final year. She was part of the last college class granted an extra year of eligibility due to the COVID-19 pandemic.

=== Fifth year (2024–25) ===
Ustby captained the Tar Heels as the only non-transfer graduate student on the team in the 2024–25 season. On March 7, 2025, she scored 12 points and grabbed 18 rebounds in a 60–56 win over Florida State, sending the Tar Heels to the semifinals of the ACC tournament. She helped North Carolina earn a three seed in the NCAA tournament, hosting tournament games at home for the first time in ten years. During the NCAA tournament, where the Tar Heels reached the third round, Ustby surpassed Bernadette McGlade to become North Carolina's all-time leading rebounder. She finished her career with 1,269 career boards, good for third in ACC history. Ustby averaged 10.9 points, 9.5 rebounds, and a team-high 2.8 assists per game in her graduate season, being named to the All-ACC first team and the ACC all-defensive team.

== Professional career ==
On April 14, 2025, a day after going undrafted in the 2025 WNBA draft, Ustby signed a one-year free agent contract with the Los Angeles Sparks, joining head coach Lynne Roberts who had tried to recruit Ustby in high school. However, she was waived by the Sparks on May 1.

On July 7, 2025, it was announced that Ustby had signed with Italian club Panthers Roseto. She finished the season leading the league with 19.5 points per game and ranked third with 10.3 rebounds per game. She was named the Eurobasket.com Serie A Player of the Year among many other honors after her rookie season.

On July 14, 2026, Ustby signed with fellow Italian club Reyer Venezia.

== Career statistics ==
Legend
GP	Games played	GS	Games started	MPG	Minutes per game	RPG	Rebounds per game
APG	Assists per game	SPG	Steals per game	BPG	Blocks per game	PPG	Points per game
TO	Turnovers per game	FG%	Field-goal percentage	3P%	3-point field-goal percentage	FT%	Free-throw percentage
**Bold**	Career best	°	League leader

=== College ===
Year	Team	GP	GS	MPG	FG%	3P%	FT%	RPG	APG	SPG	BPG	TO	PPG
2020–21	UNC	24	17	30.0	49.8	32.4	54.3	5.7	2.2	1.6	0.5	**1.8**	9.9
2021–22	UNC	32	32	31.8	44.5	30.9	57.5	8.6	2.3	1.7	0.7	2.4	12.9
2022–23	UNC	28	28	31.0	**50.6**	30.3	56.9	8.3	2.3	**1.9**	1.1	3.0	**13.2**
2023–24	UNC	**33**	**33**	**33.9**	47.5	25.0	**57.7**	**9.5**	**3.6**	1.7	**1.3**	2.9	12.5
2024–25	UNC	**33**	**33**	29.9	45.6	**34.0**	55.0	**9.5**	2.8	1.2	1.0	2.6	10.9
**Career**		150	143	31.4	47.3	31.6	56.6	8.5	2.7	1.6	0.9	2.6	11.9
Statistics retrieved from Sports-Reference.

== National team career ==
Before her junior year of college, Ustby played for the United States national under-23 3x3 team in August–September 2022.
