= Oluchi Okananwa =

American basketball player (born 2004)

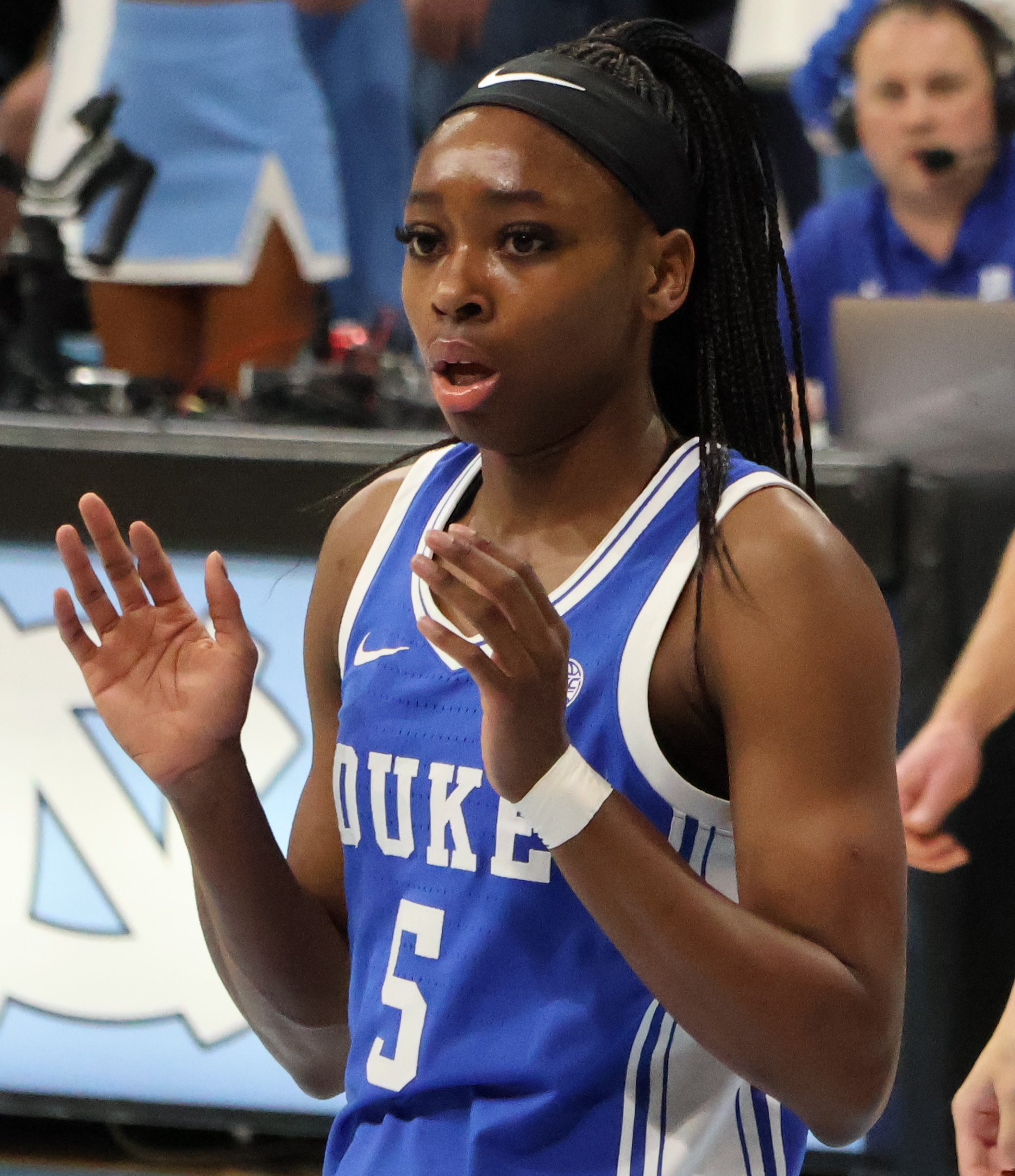
- Okananwa with Duke in 2025

Maryland Terrapins
- Position: Guard
- League: Big Ten Conference

Personal information
- Born: February 27, 2004 (age 22)
- Listed height: 5 ft 10 in (1.78 m)

Career information
- High school: Peabody (Peabody, Massachusetts); New Hampton Prep (New Hampton, New Hampshire); Worcester Academy (Worcester, Massachusetts)
- College: Duke (2023–2025); Maryland (2025–present)

Career highlights
- ACC Tournament MVP (2025); ACC Sixth Player of the Year (2024); First-team All-Big Ten (2026); Big Ten All-Defensive Team (2026); ACC All-Freshman team (2024)

Oluchi Okananwa (born February 27, 2004) is an American college basketball player for Maryland. She previously played for Duke.

== High school career ==
Okananwa began her career at Peabody High School. During her freshman year she averaged 16.7 points, 7.6 rebounds, and 7.2 steals per game, and was named Northeastern Conference Player of the Year. She then transferred to New Hampton Prep where she played for two seasons. She graduated from Worcester Academy in 2023. During her senior year she served as team captain and was named New England Preparatory School Athletic Council (NEPSAC) AA Player of the Year, and an All-NEPSAC First Team honoree. In November 2022, she committed to play college basketball at Duke.

== College career ==
=== Duke ===
During the 2023–24 season, in her freshman year, she appeared in all 34 games, and averaged 9.7 points and a team-leading 6.1 rebounds per game while coming off the bench. She made her collegiate debut on November 6, 2023, in a game against Richmond, and recorded 22 points, 12 rebounds, three steals and two assists in 25 minutes. She became the first freshman since 2014, and the seventh Blue Devil all-time, to post a double-double in their first career game. On January 25, 2024, in a game against Florida State, she recorded a career-high 13 rebounds. Following the season she was named the Atlantic Coast Conference (ACC) Sixth Player of the Year, and named to the All-ACC Freshman Team. She became the first player in program history to receive the award.

During the 2024–25 season, in her sophomore year, she appeared in all 37 games, and averaged 10.1 points, 5.3 rebounds, 1.8 assists and 1.8 steals per game. She led the team in steals (65) and offensive rebounds (90), ranked second in rebounds (196) and free throws (65) and third in scoring (370) and defensive rebounds (106). During the 2025 ACC tournament, she averaged 16.3 points and 6.7 rebounds in three games to help Duke win their first ACC women's basketball tournament since 2013. During the championship game against NC State she recorded a double-double with a career-high tying 22 points and 10 rebounds off the bench. She was subsequently named to the ACC All-Tournament first team, and tournament MVP, becoming the first ACC player this century to earn MVP honors while coming off the bench. During the Sweet Sixteen of the 2025 NCAA tournament against North Carolina, she recorded 12 points and a season-high 12 rebounds, for her third double-double of the season, and helped Duke advance to the Elite Eight for the first time since 2013.

=== Maryland ===
On April 18, 2025, Okananwa transferred to Maryland. During the 2025–26 season, in her junior year, she led the team in scoring with 17.7 points per game. On November 23, 2025, against George Mason, she scored a then career-high 23 points, four rebounds and five assists. On December 29, 2025, against Wisconsin, she scored a career-high 28 points, and a career-high tying six steals. On January 4, 2026, against Indiana she scored a career-high 34 points, the 12th-highest scoring game in program history. During the regular season she scored in double figures in 26 of 30 games and scored 20 or more points in 12 games. She led the Big Ten in fastbreak points (5.2), ranked second in steals (2.3) and fourth in free throws made (81). Following the season she was named a first-team All-Big Ten and Big Ten All-Defensive team selection.

As of July 2026, Okananwa is interim president of the United College Athletes Association, a college sports trade union organization.

== Career statistics ==
Legend
GP	Games played	GS	Games started	MPG	Minutes per game	RPG	Rebounds per game
APG	Assists per game	SPG	Steals per game	BPG	Blocks per game	PPG	Points per game
TO	Turnovers per game	FG%	Field-goal percentage	3P%	3-point field-goal percentage	FT%	Free-throw percentage
**Bold**	Career best	°	League leader

=== College ===
Year	Team	GP	GS	MPG	FG%	3P%	FT%	RPG	APG	SPG	BPG	TO	PPG
2022–23	Duke	34	0	21.5	47.8	**34.8**	**75.9**	**6.1**	1.5	1.3	**0.3**	2.4	9.7
2024–25	Duke	**37**	0	22.5	47.3	30.0	69.9	5.3	1.8	1.8	0.2	1.8	10.1
2025–26	Maryland	33	**33**	**26.9**	**51.8**	29.6	74.3	5.4	**2.0**	**2.2**	0.2	**2.6**	**17.8**
**Career**		104	33	23.5	49.4	31.5	73.5	5.6	1.8	1.8	0.3	2.3	12.4
Statistics retrieved from Sports-Reference. and ESPN.
