= 2024–25 Coppin State Eagles women's basketball team =

American college basketball season

2024–25 Coppin State Eagles women's basketball

WNIT, second round
- Conference: Mid-Eastern Athletic Conference
- Record: 19–15 (8–6 MEAC)
- Head coach: Jermaine Woods (3rd season)
- Associate head coach: Casey Monroe-Gaskins; Lindsey Payton
- Assistant coach: Brian Randolph
- Home arena: Physical Education Complex

2024–25 MEAC women's basketball standings
	Conf.				Overall
Team	W		L	PCT	W		L	PCT
Norfolk State †	14	–	0	1.000	30	–	5	.857
Howard	12	–	2	.857	22	–	12	.647
Maryland Eastern Shore	8	–	6	.571	14	–	17	.452
Coppin State	8	–	6	.571	19	–	15	.559
North Carolina Central	6	–	8	.429	9	–	21	.300
Morgan State	6	–	8	.429	13	–	17	.433
Delaware State	1	–	13	.071	5	–	24	.172
South Carolina State	1	–	13	.071	2	–	29	.065
† 2025 MEAC tournament winner

The 2024–25 Coppin State Eagles women's basketball team represented Coppin State University during the 2024–25 NCAA Division I women's basketball season. The Eagles, who were led by third-year head coach Jermaine Woods, played their home games at the Physical Education Complex in Baltimore, Maryland as members of the Mid-Eastern Athletic Conference (MEAC).

== Previous season ==
The Eagles finished the 2023–24 season 12–18, 8–6 in MEAC play, to finish in a tie for fourth place. They defeated Maryland Eastern Shore in the quarterfinal round of the MEAC tournament before falling to top-seeded and eventual tournament champions Norfolk State in the semifinals.

== Preseason ==
On October 8, 2024, the MEAC released their preseason coaches poll. Coppin State was picked to finish third in the MEAC.

=== Preseason rankings ===
MEAC preseason poll
Predicted finish	Team	Votes (1st place)
T–1	Norfolk State	117 (11)
T–1	Howard	117 (5)
3	Coppin State	79
4	North Carolina Central	78
5	Morgan State	63
6	Maryland Eastern Shore	57
7	Delaware State	43
8	South Carolina State	22

=== Preseason All-MEAC Teams ===
Preseason All-MEAC Teams
Team	Player	Position	Year
First	Laila Lawrence	Guard	Senior
Second	Angel Jones	Guard	Junior

== Roster ==
2024–25 Coppin State Eagles women's basketball team
Players
Coaches

Pos.	#	Name	Height	Year	Previous school	Hometown
G	0	Kylah Moore	5 ft 6 in (1.68 m)	Fr	Catholic High School	Chesapeake, VA
G	1	Cire Worley	6 ft 0 in (1.83 m)	So	UMass Lowell	Philadelphia, PA
G	2	Tiffany Hammond	5 ft 9 in (1.75 m)	RS Sr	CCBC Essex	Trenton, NJ
F/C	3	Arielle-Vadrelle Belinga	6 ft 3 in (1.91 m)	Sr	Coastal Carolina	Riverdale, GA
G	5	Tyler Gray	5 ft 6 in (1.68 m)	RS Sr	CCBC Essex	Bladensburg, MD
F	10	Dani McTeer	6 ft 0 in (1.83 m)	RS Jr	William & Mary	Hampton, VA
G	11	Angel Jones	5 ft 4 in (1.63 m)	Jr	Siena	Woodbridge, VA
G	12	Mickelle Lowry	5 ft 6 in (1.68 m)	Fr	Baltimore Polytechnic Institute	Baltimore, MD
F	15	Charia Roberts	6 ft 0 in (1.83 m)	GS	Loyola (MD)	Pikesville, MD
G	20	Niyah Gaston	5 ft 10 in (1.78 m)	So	King's Fork High School	Suffolk, VA
F	23	Khya Jenkins	6 ft 0 in (1.83 m)	Sr	Millbrook School	Long Island, NY
F	31	Laila Lawrence	6 ft 2 in (1.88 m)	Sr	Texas A&M–Commerce	Lewisville, TX

Head coach

- Jermaine Woods (Christopher Newport)

Assistant coach(es)

- Casey Monroe-Gaskins (Maryland Eastern Shore)
- Lindsey Payton (Arizona Christian)
- Brian Randolph (Coppin State)

Legend

- (C) Team captain
- (S) Suspended
- (I) Ineligible
- (W) Walk-on
- Injured
- Current redshirt

Roster
Last update: May 27, 2025

== Schedule and results ==
Date time, TV	Rank^{#}	Opponent^{#}	Result	Record	Site (attendance) city, state
Non-conference regular season
November 4, 2024*; 7:00 p.m., ESPN+		Frostburg State	W 72–70	1–0	Physical Education Complex (327); Baltimore, MD
November 7, 2024*; 6:00 p.m., B1G+		at No. 18 Maryland	L 47–70	1–1	Xfinity Center (5,040); College Park, MD
November 12, 2024*; 11:00 a.m., ESPN+		Saint Francis	W 74–38	2–1	Physical Education Complex (3,247); Baltimore, MD
November 14, 2024*; 7:00 p.m., SECN+		at No. 1 South Carolina	L 60–92	2–2	Colonial Life Arena (15,550); Columbia, SC
November 16, 2024*; 2:00 p.m., ACCNX		at Virginia Tech	L 51–86	2–3	Cassell Coliseum (4,890); Blacksburg, VA
November 24, 2024*; 2:00 p.m., ESPN+		at Sacred Heart	W 59–47	3–3	William H. Pitt Center (922); Fairfield, CT
November 29, 2024*; 1:00 p.m., ESPN+		at North Florida; UNF Thanksgiving Tournament	W 76–61	4–3	UNF Arena (360); Jacksonville, FL
November 30, 2024*; 3:30 p.m.		vs. Stephen F. Austin; UNF Thanksgiving Tournament	L 60–81	4–4	UNF Arena (102); Jacksonville, FL
December 3, 2024*; 6:00 p.m., ESPN+		at NJIT	W 63–61	5–4	Wellness and Events Center (245); Newark, NJ
December 5, 2024*; 7:00 p.m., ESPN+		Arizona State	W 74–68 ^{OT}	6–4	Physical Education Complex (511); Baltimore, MD
December 8, 2024*; 2:00 p.m., ACCNX		at No. 16 North Carolina	L 46–72	6–5	Carmichael Arena (2,415); Chapel Hill, NC
December 10, 2024*; 6:00 p.m., ESPN+		at George Washington	W 64–61 ^{OT}	7–5	Charles E. Smith Center (436); Washington, D.C.
December 19, 2024*; 5:00 p.m., ESPN+		Kent State	W 67–61	8–5	Physical Education Complex (295); Baltimore, MD
December 21, 2024*; 1:00 p.m., ACCNX		at Virginia	L 66–74	8–6	John Paul Jones Arena (4,286); Charlottesville, VA
December 28, 2024*; 1:30 p.m.		vs. Bryant; FDU Christmas Tournament	W 69–52	9–6	Bogota Savings Bank Center (185); Hackensack, NJ
December 29, 2024*; 1:00 p.m.		vs. Maine; FDU Christmas Tournament	L 55–66	9–7	Bogota Savings Bank Center (185); Hackensack, NJ
MEAC regular season
January 4, 2025; 2:00 p.m., ESPN+		North Carolina Central	W 69–66	10–7 (1–0)	Physical Education Complex (211); Baltimore, MD
January 6, 2025; 5:30 p.m., ESPN+		South Carolina State	W 84–38	11–7 (2–0)	Physical Education Complex (130); Baltimore, MD
January 11, 2025; 2:00 p.m., ESPN+		at Norfolk State	L 66–82	11–8 (2–1)	Echols Hall (1,136); Norfolk, VA
January 13, 2025; 5:30 p.m., ESPN+		at Howard	L 71–76	11–9 (2–2)	Burr Gymnasium (831); Washington, D.C.
January 25, 2025; 2:00 p.m., ESPN+		at Morgan State	W 61–56	12–9 (3–2)	Hill Field House (389); Baltimore, MD
February 1, 2025; 2:00 p.m., ESPN+		Delaware State	W 90–57	13–9 (4–2)	Physical Education Complex (665); Baltimore, MD
February 3, 2025; 5:30 p.m.		at Maryland Eastern Shore	W 66–61	14–9 (5–2)	Hytche Athletic Center (361); Princess Anne, MD
February 15, 2025; 2:00 p.m., ESPN+		at North Carolina Central	W 63–53	15–9 (6–2)	McDougald–McLendon Arena (340); Durham, NC
February 17, 2025; 5:30 p.m.		at South Carolina State	W 57–45	16–9 (7–2)	SHM Memorial Center (251); Orangeburg, SC
February 22, 2025; 2:00 p.m., ESPN+		Norfolk State	L 54–76	16–10 (7–3)	Physical Education Complex (1,675); Baltimore, MD
February 24, 2025; 5:30 p.m., ESPN+		Howard	L 60–70	16–11 (7–4)	Physical Education Complex (279); Baltimore, MD
March 1, 2025; 2:00 p.m., ESPN+		at Delaware State	W 73–59	17–11 (8–4)	Memorial Hall (217); Dover, DE
March 3, 2025; 5:30 p.m., ESPN+		Maryland Eastern Shore	L 56–62	17–12 (8–5)	Physical Education Complex (307); Baltimore, MD
March 6, 2025; 5:30 p.m., ESPN+		Morgan State	L 54–59	17–13 (8–6)	Physical Education Complex (619); Baltimore, MD
MEAC tournament
March 13, 2025; 12:00 p.m., ESPN+	(4)	vs. (5) North Carolina Central; Quarterfinals	W 57–48	18–13	Norfolk Scope; Norfolk, VA
March 14, 2025; 12:00 p.m., ESPN+	(4)	vs. (1) Norfolk State; Semifinals	L 33–72	18–14	Norfolk Scope; Norfolk, VA
WNIT
March 22, 2025*; 6:00 p.m., ESPN+		at Colgate; First round	W 58–48	19–14	Cotterell Court (243); Hamilton, NY
March 25, 2025*; 7:00 p.m., ESPN+		at Cleveland State; Second round	L 70–72 ^{OT}	19–15	Wolstein Center (290); Cleveland, OH
*Non-conference game. ^{#}Rankings from AP poll. (#) Tournament seedings in parentheses. All times are in Eastern.
