= 2024–25 Delaware State Hornets women's basketball team =

American college basketball season

2024–25 Delaware State Hornets women's basketball
- Conference: Mid-Eastern Athletic Conference
- Record: 5–24 (1–13 MEAC)
- Head coach: Jazmone Turner (1st season)
- Assistant coaches: Cherelle Dennis; Malick Kone; Kaliya Garcia
- Home arena: Memorial Hall

2024–25 MEAC women's basketball standings
	Conf.				Overall
Team	W		L	PCT	W		L	PCT
Norfolk State †	14	–	0	1.000	30	–	5	.857
Howard	12	–	2	.857	22	–	12	.647
Maryland Eastern Shore	8	–	6	.571	14	–	17	.452
Coppin State	8	–	6	.571	19	–	15	.559
North Carolina Central	6	–	8	.429	9	–	21	.300
Morgan State	6	–	8	.429	13	–	17	.433
Delaware State	1	–	13	.071	5	–	24	.172
South Carolina State	1	–	13	.071	2	–	29	.065
† 2025 MEAC tournament winner

The 2024–25 Delaware State Hornets women's basketball team represented Delaware State University during the 2024–25 NCAA Division I women's basketball season. The Hornets, who were led by first-year head coach Jazmone Turner, played their home games at Memorial Hall in Dover, Delaware as members of the Mid-Eastern Athletic Conference (MEAC).

== Previous season ==
The Hornets finished the 2023–24 season 8–20, 4–10 in MEAC play, to finish in sixth place. They were defeated by North Carolina Central in the quarterfinals of the MEAC tournament.

== Preseason ==
On October 8, 2024, the MEAC released their preseason coaches poll. Delaware State was picked to finish seventh in the MEAC.

=== Preseason rankings ===
MEAC preseason poll
Predicted finish	Team	Votes (1st place)
T-1	Norfolk State	117 (11)
T-1	Howard	117 (5)
3	Coppin State	79
4	North Carolina Central	78
5	Morgan State	63
6	Maryland Eastern Shore	57
7	Delaware State	43
8	South Carolina State	22

=== Preseason All-MEAC Teams ===
No Hornets were named to the Preseason All-MEAC First, Second or Third teams.

== Roster ==
2024–25 Delaware State Hornets women's basketball team
Players
Coaches

Pos.	#	Name	Height	Year	Previous school	Hometown
G	0	Brooke Barnes	5 ft 9 in (1.75 m)	Fr	Paul VI High School	Philadelphia, Pennsylvania
G	1	Kyra Lawrence	5 ft 11 in (1.8 m)	Jr	Schoolcraft College	Farmington Hills, Michigan
PG	3	Destaney Harris	5 ft 2 in (1.57 m)	Fr	Loch Raven High School	Baltimore, Maryland
PG	4	Najáh Lane	5 ft 5 in (1.65 m)	Jr	Johnson C. Smith	Charlotte, North Carolina
PG	5	Kiarra Mcelrath	5 ft 7 in (1.7 m)	So	Bishop Hartley High School	Columbus, Ohio
F	10	Ericka Huggins	6 ft 0 in (1.83 m)	Fr	St. Elizabeth High School	Wilmington, Delaware
G	11	Tamera Maple	5 ft 9 in (1.75 m)	Sr	Bluefield	Cleveland, Ohio
G	14	Mahogany Cottingham	5 ft 9 in (1.75 m)	So	North Dakota	Cleveland, Ohio
G	15	Cydney Curtis	5 ft 6 in (1.68 m)	Jr	Baltimore Polytech	Baltimore, Maryland
F	23	Aubree Murray	6 ft 2 in (1.88 m)	Fr	Frederick High School	Frederick, Maryland
SG	24	Katia Nekic	5 ft 8 in (1.73 m)	Jr	Otero College	Zadar, Croatia
F	30	McKenzie Stewart	6 ft 0 in (1.83 m)	So	Flowers High School	Glenarden, Maryland
PF	40	Nala Abraham	6 ft 2 in (1.88 m)	Fr	Gwynn Park High School	Brandywine, Maryland
F/C	55	Circe Rubio Remolar	6 ft 1 in (1.85 m)	So	C.N. HELIOS A1	Zaragoza, Spain

Head coach

- Jazmone Turner (Muskingum)

Assistant coach(es)

- Cherelle Dennis (Lincoln)
- Malick Kone (Rutgers)
- Kaliya Garcia (Delaware State)

Legend

- (C) Team captain
- (S) Suspended
- (I) Ineligible
- (W) Walk-on
- Injured
- Current redshirt

Roster
Last update: June 10, 2025

== Schedule and results ==
Date time, TV	Rank^{#}	Opponent^{#}	Result	Record	Site (attendance) city, state
Non-conference regular season
November 4, 2024*; 5:30 pm		Georgian Court	W 71–44	1–0	Memorial Hall (250); Dover, DE
November 8, 2024*; 7:00 pm, ESPN+		at Dayton	L 44–79	1–1	UD Arena (1,111); Dayton, OH
November 10, 2024*; 2:00 pm, ESPN+		at Cincinnati	L 46–83	1–2	Fifth Third Arena (1,115); Cincinnati, OH
November 14, 2024*; 5:30 pm, ESPN+		No. 19 Ole Miss	L 42–80	1–3	Memorial Hall (300); Dover, DE
November 16, 2024*; 2:00 pm		Cheyney; Legacy and Pride Classic	W 80–44	2–3	Memorial Hall (250); Dover, DE
November 20, 2024*; 11:00 am, ACCNX		at Pittsburgh	L 45–80	2–4	Petersen Events Center (2,622); Pittsburgh, PA
November 25, 2024*; 5:30 pm, ESPN+		Bloomfield	W 76–73	3–4	Memorial Hall (145); Dover, DE
December 5, 2024*; 11:00 am, ESPN+		Saint Francis	L 60–69	3–5	Memorial Hall (315); Dover, DE
December 7, 2024*; 2:00 pm, FloHoops		at Delaware	L 26–73	3–6	Bob Carpenter Center (971); Newark, DE
December 9, 2024*; 4:30 pm, ESPN+		at VCU	L 43–79	3–7	Siegel Center (357); Richmond, VA
December 14, 2024*; 2:00 pm, NEC Front Row		at LIU	L 63–65 ^{OT}	3–8	Steinberg Wellness Center (100); Brooklyn, NY
December 20, 2024*; 11:30 am, ESPN+		at Penn	L 45–72	3–9	Palestra (521); Philadelphia, PA
December 30, 2024*; 4:00 pm		Hampton	L 47–64	3–10	Memorial Hall (124); Dover, DE
MEAC regular season
January 4, 2025; 5:00 pm, ESPN+		at Howard	L 66–74	3–11 (0–1)	Burr Gymnasium (559); Washington, D.C.
January 6, 2025; 2:00 pm, ESPN+		Norfolk State	L 54–94	3–12 (0–2)	Memorial Hall (600); Dover, DE
January 11, 2025; 2:00 pm		at South Carolina State	L 62–68	3–13 (0–3)	SHM Memorial Center (352); Orangeburg, SC
January 13, 2025; 5:30 pm, ESPN+		at North Carolina Central	L 71–76	3–14 (0–4)	McDougald–McLendon Arena (1,367); Durham, NC
January 25, 2025; 2:00 pm		at Maryland Eastern Shore	L 46–66	3–15 (0–5)	Hytche Athletic Center (378); Princess Anne, MD
February 1, 2025; 2:00 pm, ESPN+		at Coppin State	L 57–90	3–16 (0–6)	Physical Education Complex (665); Baltimore, MD
February 3, 2025; 5:30 pm, ESPN+		Morgan State	L 49–64	3–17 (0–7)	Memorial Hall (276); Dover, DE
February 8, 2025*; 2:00 pm, ESPN+		Virginia–Lynchburg	W 84–55	4–17	Memorial Hall (167); Dover, DE
February 15, 2025; 2:00 pm, ESPN+		Howard	L 45–62	4–18 (0–8)	Memorial Hall (1,500); Dover, DE
February 17, 2025; 5:30 pm, ESPN+		at Norfolk State	L 44–92	4–19 (0–9)	Echols Hall (2,245); Norfolk, VA
February 22, 2025; 2:00 pm, ESPN+		South Carolina State	W 77–56	5–19 (1–9)	Memorial Hall (201); Dover, DE
February 24, 2025; 5:30 pm, ESPN+		North Carolina Central	L 47–82	5–20 (1–10)	Memorial Hall (196); Dover, DE
March 1, 2025; 2:00 pm, ESPN+		Coppin State	L 59–73	5–21 (1–11)	Memorial Hall (217); Dover, DE
March 3, 2025; 5:30 pm, ESPN+		at Morgan State	L 47–68	5–22 (1–12)	Hill Field House (2,123); Baltimore, MD
March 6, 2025; 5:30 pm, ESPN+		Maryland Eastern Shore	L 35–69	5–23 (1–13)	Memorial Hall (109); Dover, DE
MEAC tournament
March 12, 2025; 2:00 pm, ESPN+	(7)	vs. (2) Howard; Quarterfinals	L 49–85	5–24	Norfolk Scope; Norfolk, VA
*Non-conference game. ^{#}Rankings from AP Poll. (#) Tournament seedings in parentheses. All times are in Eastern.
