= 2025 NCAA Division I women's basketball tournament =

American college basketball tournament

- Season: 2024–25
- Teams: 68
- Finals site: Amalie Arena, Tampa, Florida
- Champions: UConn Huskies (12th title, 13th title game, 24th Final Four)
- Runner-up: South Carolina Gamecocks (4th title game, 7th Final Four)
- Semifinalists: Texas Longhorns (4th Final Four); UCLA Bruins (1st Final Four)
- Winning coach: Geno Auriemma (12th title)
- MOP: Azzi Fudd (UConn)

The 2025 NCAA Division I women's basketball tournament was a 68-team single-elimination tournament to determine the National Collegiate Athletic Association (NCAA) Division I college basketball national champion for the 2024–25 NCAA Division I women's basketball season. The 43rd edition of the tournament began on March 19, 2025, and concluded with the championship game on April 6, at Amalie Arena in Tampa, Florida. The UConn Huskies won their 12th national championship by defeating the South Carolina Gamecocks.

Atlantic 10 champion George Mason, Big West champion UC San Diego, NEC champion Fairleigh Dickinson, Sun Belt champion Arkansas State, WAC champion Grand Canyon, and CAA champion William & Mary all made their NCAA tournament debuts. Additionally, SoCon champion UNC Greensboro made their first appearance since 1998 and second appearance overall. For the first time since 1987, Stanford did not qualify for the tournament.

For the first time in Women's March Madness history since expanding to 64-plus teams, no team successfully completed an official upset, defined by the NCAA as by five or more seeding lines, an occurrence which has never happened in the Men's tournament. The closest any team came to an upset was 13-seed Liberty, who lost in the Round of 64 to 4-seed Kentucky by 1 point in a 79–78 loss.

== Tournament procedure ==
Out of 355 eligible Division I teams, 68 participated in the tournament. (Note: Nine teams are ineligible, all due to being in the process of reclassifying to Division I from a lower division: East Texas A&M, Le Moyne, Lindenwood, Mercyhurst, Queens, St. Thomas, Southern Indiana, Stonehill, and West Georgia.) A total of 31 automatic bids are awarded to each program that win a conference tournament. The remaining 37 bids are issued "at-large", with selections extended by the NCAA Selection Committee on Selection Sunday, March 16. The Selection Committee will also seed the entire field from 1 to 68.

Eight teams (the four-lowest seeded automatic qualifiers and the four lowest-seeded at large-teams) play in the First Four. The winners of these games will advance to the main tournament bracket.

First four out
NET	School	Conference	Record
47	Virginia Tech	ACC	18–12
53	Saint Joseph's	A-10	23–9
60	James Madison	Sun Belt	28–5
49	UNLV	MWC	25–7

== Schedule and venues ==
First Four

- March 19 and 20
  - Pauley Pavilion, Los Angeles, California (Host: University of California, Los Angeles)
  - Purcell Pavilion, Notre Dame, Indiana (Host: University of Notre Dame)
  - Moody Center, Austin, Texas (Host: University of Texas at Austin)
  - Carmichael Arena, Chapel Hill, North Carolina (Host: University of North Carolina at Chapel Hill)

Subregionals (First and Second Rounds)

- March 21 and 23 (Fri/Sun)
  - Pauley Pavilion, Los Angeles, California (Host: University of California, Los Angeles)
  - Foster Pavilion, Waco, Texas (Host: Baylor University)
  - Memorial Coliseum, Lexington, Kentucky (Host: University of Kentucky)
  - Colonial Life Arena, Columbia, South Carolina (Host: University of South Carolina)
  - Cameron Indoor Stadium, Durham, North Carolina (Host: Duke University)
  - Value City Arena, Columbus, Ohio (Host: Ohio State University)
  - Purcell Pavilion, Notre Dame, Indiana (Host: University of Notre Dame)
  - Schollmaier Arena, Fort Worth, Texas (Host: Texas Christian University)
- March 22 and 24 (Sat/Mon)
  - Harry A. Gampel Pavilion, Storrs, Connecticut (Host: University of Connecticut)
  - Pete Maravich Assembly Center, Baton Rouge, Louisiana (Host: Louisiana State University)
  - Reynolds Coliseum, Raleigh, North Carolina (Host: North Carolina State University)
  - Galen Center, Los Angeles, California (Host: University of Southern California)
  - Lloyd Noble Center, Norman, Oklahoma (Host: University of Oklahoma)
  - Xfinity Center, College Park, Maryland (Host: University of Maryland, College Park)
  - Carmichael Arena, Chapel Hill, North Carolina (Host: University of North Carolina at Chapel Hill)
  - Moody Center, Austin, Texas (Host: University of Texas at Austin)

Regional Semifinals and Finals (Sweet Sixteen and Elite Eight)

- March 28–31
  - Birmingham Regional, Legacy Arena, Birmingham, Alabama (Hosts: Southeastern Conference)
  - Spokane Regional, Spokane Arena, Spokane, Washington (Hosts: University of Idaho)

National Semifinals and Championship (Final Four and Championship)

- April 4 and April 6
  - Amalie Arena, Tampa, Florida (Host: University of South Florida)

Tampa is scheduled to host the women's Final Four for the fourth time; the third was in 2019.

== Qualification and selection of teams ==
The 68 teams came from 36 states.

Teams that participated in the 2025 tournament. Spokane 1 Region (red), Birmingham 2 Region (blue), Birmingham 3 Region (green), and Spokane 4 Region (purple)

=== Automatic qualifiers ===
Teams who won their conference championships automatically qualify.

Automatic qualifiers in the 2025 NCAA Division I women's basketball tournament
Conference	Team	Appearance	Last bid
America East	Vermont	8th	2023
American	South Florida	10th	2023
Atlantic 10	George Mason	1st	Never
ACC	Duke	27th	2024
ASUN	Florida Gulf Coast	11th	2024
Big 12	TCU	10th	2010
Big East	UConn	36th	2024
Big Sky	Montana State	4th	2022
Big South	High Point	2nd	2021
Big Ten	UCLA	20th	2024
Big West	UC San Diego	1st	Never
CAA	William & Mary	1st	Never
CUSA	Liberty	18th	2018
Horizon	Green Bay	20th	2024
Ivy League	Harvard	7th	2007
MAAC	Fairfield	7th	2024
MAC	Ball State	2nd	2009
MEAC	Norfolk State	4th	2024
Missouri Valley	Murray State	2nd	2008
Mountain West	San Diego State	10th	2012
NEC	Fairleigh Dickinson	1st	Never
Ohio Valley	Tennessee Tech	12th	2023
Patriot	Lehigh	5th	2021
SEC	South Carolina	21st	2024
Southern	UNC Greensboro	2nd	1998
Southland	Stephen F. Austin	21st	2022
SWAC	Southern	7th	2023
Summit League	South Dakota State	13th	2024
Sun Belt	Arkansas State	1st	Never
WAC	Grand Canyon	1st	Never
WCC	Oregon State	14th	2024

=== Seeds ===
The tournament seeds and regions are determined through the NCAA basketball tournament selection process and were published by the selection committee after the brackets are released on March 16.

Spokane Regional 1 – Spokane Arena; Spokane, WA
Seed	School	Conference	Record	Overall Seed	Berth type	Last bid
1	UCLA	Big Ten	30–2	1	Automatic	2024
2	NC State	ACC	25–8	8	At Large	2024
3	LSU	SEC	28–5	10	At Large	2024
4	Baylor	Big 12	27–6	14	At Large	2024
5	Ole Miss	SEC	20–10	17	At Large	2024
6	Florida State	ACC	23–8	23	At Large	2024
7	Michigan State	Big Ten	21–9	25	At Large	2024
8	Richmond	Atlantic 10	27–6	32	At Large	2024
9	Georgia Tech	ACC	22–10	35	At Large	2022
10	Harvard	Ivy	24–4	40	Automatic	2007
11	George Mason	Atlantic 10	27–5	45	Automatic	Never
12	Ball State	Mid American	27–7	50	Automatic	2009
13	Grand Canyon	WAC	32–2	51	Automatic	Never
14	San Diego State	Mountain West	25–9	58	Automatic	2012
15	Vermont	America East	21–12	59	Automatic	2023
16*	UC San Diego	Big West	20–15	65	Automatic	Never
16*	Southern	SWAC	20–14	66	Automatic	2023

Spokane Regional 4 – Spokane Arena; Spokane, WA
Seed	School	Conference	Record	Overall Seed	Berth type	Last bid
1	USC	Big Ten	28–3	4	At-Large	2024
2	UConn	Big East	31–3	5	Automatic	2024
3	Oklahoma	SEC	25–7	11	At Large	2024
4	Kentucky	SEC	22–7	13	At Large	2022
5	Kansas State	Big 12	26–7	20	At Large	2024
6	Iowa	Big Ten	22–10	21	At Large	2024
7	Oklahoma State	Big 12	25–6	27	At Large	2023
8	California	ACC	25–8	29	At Large	2019
9	Mississippi State	SEC	21–11	36	At Large	2023
10	South Dakota State	Summit League	29–3	37	Automatic	2024
11	Murray State	Missouri Valley	25–7	46	Automatic	2008
12	Fairfield	MAAC	28–4	47	Automatic	2024
13	Liberty	CUSA	26–6	54	Automatic	2018
14	Florida Gulf Coast	Atlantic Sun	30–3	55	Automatic	2024
15	Arkansas State	Sun Belt	21–10	62	Automatic	Never
16	UNC Greensboro	Southern	25–6	64	Automatic	1998

Birmingham Regional 2 – Legacy Arena; Birmingham, AL
Seed	School	Conference	Record	Overall Seed	Berth type	Last bid
1	South Carolina	SEC	30–3	2	Automatic	2024
2	Duke	ACC	26–7	7	Automatic	2024
3	North Carolina	ACC	27–7	12	At Large	2024
4	Maryland	Big Ten	23–7	16	At Large	2024
5	Alabama	SEC	23–8	18	At Large	2024
6	West Virginia	Big 12	24-7	24	At Large	2024
7	Vanderbilt	SEC	22–10	28	At Large	2024
8	Utah	Big 12	22–8	31	At Large	2024
9	Indiana	Big Ten	19–12	33	At Large	2024
10	Oregon	Big Ten	19–11	39	At Large	2022
11*	Columbia	Ivy	23–6	41	At Large	2024
11*	Washington	Big Ten	19–13	42	At Large	2017
12	Green Bay	Horizon	29–5	49	Automatic	2024
13	Norfolk State	MEAC	30–4	52	Automatic	2024
14	Oregon State	WCC	19–15	57	Automatic	2024
15	Lehigh	Patriot	27–6	60	Automatic	2021
16	Tennessee Tech	Ohio Valley	26–5	63	Automatic	2023

Birmingham Regional 3 – Legacy Arena; Birmingham, AL
Seed	School	Conference	Record	Overall Seed	Berth type	Last bid
1	Texas	SEC	31–3	3	At Large	2024
2	TCU	Big 12	31–3	6	Automatic	2010
3	Notre Dame	ACC	26–5	9	At Large	2024
4	Ohio State	Big Ten	25–6	15	At Large	2024
5	Tennessee	SEC	22–9	19	At Large	2024
6	Michigan	Big Ten	22-10	22	At Large	2024
7	Louisville	ACC	21–10	26	At Large	2023
8	Illinois	Big Ten	21–9	30	At Large	2023
9	Creighton	Big East	26–6	34	At Large	2024
10	Nebraska	Big Ten	21–11	38	At Large	2024
11*	Iowa State	Big 12	22–11	43	At Large	2024
11*	Princeton	Ivy	21–7	44	At Large	2024
12	South Florida	AAC	23–10	48	Automatic	2023
13	Montana State	Big Sky	30–3	53	Automatic	2022
14	Stephen F. Austin	Southland	29–5	56	Automatic	2022
15	Fairleigh Dickinson	NEC	29–3	61	Automatic	Never
16*	High Point	Big South	21–11	67	Automatic	2021
16*	William & Mary	CAA	15–18	68	Automatic	Never

*See First Four

== Tournament bracket ==
All times are listed in Eastern Daylight Time (UTC−4).

=== First Four ===
The First Four games involve eight teams: the four lowest-seeded automatic qualifiers and the four lowest-seeded at-large teams.

March 19 – Spokane Regional 1 Los Angeles, California
16	UC San Diego	56
16	Southern	68

March 19 – Birmingham Regional 3 Notre Dame, Indiana
11	Iowa State	68
11	Princeton	63

March 20 – Birmingham Regional 3 Austin, Texas
16	High Point	63
16	William & Mary	69

March 20 – Birmingham Regional 2 Chapel Hill, North Carolina
11	Columbia	63
11	Washington	60

=== Spokane regional 1 – Spokane, WA ===
First round Round of 64; March 21–22
1	UCLA	84
16	Southern	46
Los Angeles, California – Fri/Sun
8	Richmond	74
9	Georgia Tech	49
5	Ole Miss	83
12	Ball State	65
Waco, Texas – Fri/Sun
4	Baylor	73
13	Grand Canyon	60
6	Florida State	94
11	George Mason	59
Baton Rouge, Louisiana – Sat/Mon
3	LSU	103
14	San Diego State	48
7	Michigan State	64
10	Harvard	50
Raleigh, North Carolina – Sat/Mon
2	NC State	75
15	Vermont	55

Second round Round of 32; March 23–24
1	UCLA	84
8	Richmond	67
5	Ole Miss	69
4	Baylor	63
6	Florida State	71
3	LSU	101
7	Michigan State	49
2	NC State	83

Regional semifinals Sweet 16; March 28
1	UCLA	76
5	Ole Miss	62
3	LSU	80
2	NC State	73

Regional Final; Elite 8 March 30
1	UCLA	72
3	LSU	65

==== Spokane regional 1 final ====
ABC

March 30
12:00 pm PDT

No. 1 UCLA Bruins 72, No. 3 LSU Tigers 65
Scoring by quarter: 9–13, 22–12, 15–16, 26–24
Pts: Gabriela Jaquez (18); Rebs: Gabriela Jaquez (8); Asts: Kiki Rice (8)	Pts: Flau'jae Johnson (28); Rebs: Sa'Myah Smith (10); Asts: Flau'jae Johnson (4)

Spokane Arena – Spokane, Washington
Attendance: 9,299
Referees: Fatou Cissoko-Stephens, Brian Hall, Brenda Pantoja

==== Spokane regional 1 all-tournament team ====
- Lauren Betts (UCLA)
- Gabriela Jaquez (UCLA)
- Flau'jae Johnson (LSU)
- Aneesah Morrow (LSU)
- Kiki Rice (UCLA)

=== Spokane regional 4 – Spokane, WA ===
First round Round of 64; March 21–22
1	USC	72
16	UNC Greensboro	25
Los Angeles, California – Sat/Mon
8	California	46
9	Mississippi State	59
5	Kansas State	85
12	Fairfield	41
Lexington, Kentucky – Fri/Sun
4	Kentucky	79
13	Liberty	78
6	Iowa	92
11	Murray State	57
Norman, Oklahoma – Sat/Mon
3	Oklahoma	81
14	Florida Gulf Coast	58
7	Oklahoma State	68
10	South Dakota State	74
Storrs, Connecticut – Sat/Mon
2	UConn	103
15	Arkansas State	34

Second round Round of 32; March 23–24
1	USC	96
9	Mississippi State	59
5	Kansas State	80^{OT}
4	Kentucky	79
6	Iowa	62
3	Oklahoma	96
10	South Dakota State	57
2	UConn	91

Regional semifinals Sweet 16; March 29
1	USC	67
5	Kansas State	61
3	Oklahoma	59
2	UConn	82

Regional Final; Elite 8 March 31
1	USC	64
2	UConn	78

==== Spokane 4 regional final ====
ESPN

March 31
6:00 pm PDT

No. 1 USC Trojans 64, No. 2 UConn Huskies 78
Scoring by quarter: 11–14, 14–25, 21–12, 18–27
Pts: Rayah Marshall (23); Rebs: Rayah Marshall (15); Asts: Tied (2)	Pts: Paige Bueckers (31); Rebs: Sarah Strong (17); Asts: Paige Bueckers (6)

Spokane Arena – Spokane, Washington
Attendance: 10,141
Referees: Maj Forsberg, Roy Gulbeyan, Katie Lukanich

==== Spokane 4 regional all-tournament team ====
- Paige Bueckers - UConn (Most Outstanding Player)
- Rayah Marshall – USC
- Kennedy Smith – USC
- Serena Sundell - Kansas State
- Sarah Strong – UConn

=== Birmingham regional 2 – Birmingham, Alabama ===
First round Round of 64; March 21–22
1	South Carolina	108
16	Tennessee Tech	48
Columbia, South Carolina – Fri/Sun
8	Utah	68
9	Indiana	76
5	Alabama	81
12	Green Bay	67
College Park, Maryland – Sat/Mon
4	Maryland	82
13	Norfolk State	69
6	West Virginia	78
11	Columbia	59
Chapel Hill, North Carolina – Sat/Mon
3	North Carolina	70
14	Oregon State	49
7	Vanderbilt	73
10	Oregon	77^{OT}
Durham, North Carolina – Fri/Sun
2	Duke	86
15	Lehigh	25

Second round Round of 32; March 23–24
1	South Carolina	64
9	Indiana	53
5	Alabama	108
4	Maryland	111^{2OT}
6	West Virginia	47
3	North Carolina	58
10	Oregon	53
2	Duke	59

Regional semifinals Sweet 16; March 28
1	South Carolina	71
4	Maryland	67
3	North Carolina	38
2	Duke	47

Regional Final; Elite 8 March 30
1	South Carolina	54
2	Duke	50

==== Birmingham regional 2 final ====
ABC

March 30
12:00 pm CDT

No. 1 South Carolina Gamecocks 54, No. 2 Duke Blue Devils 50
Scoring by quarter: 16–10, 10–12, 12–20, 16–8
Pts: Chloe Kitts (14); Rebs: Sania Feagin (8); Asts: Sania Feagin (3)	Pts: Toby Fournier (18); Rebs: Oluchi Okananwa (7); Asts: Ashlon Jackson (6)

Legacy Arena – Birmingham, Alabama
Attendance: 11,252
Referees: Natasha Camy, In'Fini Robinson, Joseph Vaszily

==== Birmingham regional 2 all-tournament team ====
- Chloe Kitts (MOP) - South Carolina
- Sania Feagin - South Carolina
- MiLaysia Fulwiley - South Carolina
- Toby Fournier - Duke
- Ashlon Jackson - Duke

=== Birmingham regional 3 – Birmingham, Alabama ===
First round Round of 64; March 21–22
1	Texas	105
16	William & Mary	61
Austin, Texas – Sat/Mon
8	Illinois	66
9	Creighton	57
5	Tennessee	101
12	South Florida	66
Columbus, Ohio – Fri/Sun
4	Ohio State	71
13	Montana State	51
6	Michigan	80
11	Iowa State	74
Notre Dame, Indiana – Fri/Sun
3	Notre Dame	106
14	Stephen F. Austin	54
7	Louisville	63
10	Nebraska	58
Fort Worth, Texas – Fri/Sun
2	TCU	73
15	Fairleigh Dickinson	51

Second round Round of 32; March 23–24
1	Texas	65
8	Illinois	48
5	Tennessee	82
4	Ohio State	67
6	Michigan	55
3	Notre Dame	76
7	Louisville	70
2	TCU	85

Regional semifinals Sweet 16; March 29
1	Texas	67
5	Tennessee	59
3	Notre Dame	62
2	TCU	71

Regional Final; Elite 8 March 31
1	Texas	58
2	TCU	47

==== Birmingham regional 3 final ====
ESPN

March 31
6:00 pm CDT

No. 1 Texas Longhorns 58, No. 2 TCU Horned Frogs 47
Scoring by quarter: 13–9, 10–12, 19–12, 16–14
Pts: Madison Booker (18); Rebs: Tied (6); Asts: Rori Harmon (5)	Pts: Hailey Van Lith (17); Rebs: Sedona Prince (9); Asts: Madison Conner (3)

Legacy Arena – Birmingham, Alabama
Attendance: 12,175
Referees: Felicia Grinter, Karen Preato, William Smith

==== Birmingham regional 3 all-tournament team ====
- Madison Booker (MOP) - Texas
- Rori Harmon - Texas
- Liatu King - Notre Dame
- Hailey Van Lith - TCU
- Sedona Prince - TCU

=== Final Four – Tampa, Florida ===
National Semifinals; Final Four; Friday, April 4
S1 (1)	UCLA	51
S4 (2)	UConn	85
B2 (1)	South Carolina	74
B3 (1)	Texas	57

National Championship Game; Sunday, April 6
S4 (2)	UConn	82
B2 (1)	South Carolina	59

==== National semifinals ====
ESPN

April 4
7:00 p.m.

South Carolina Gamecocks 74, Texas Longhorns 57
Scoring by quarter: 18–19, 20–16, 20–9, 16–13
Pts: Te-Hina Paopao (14); Rebs: Joyce Edwards (11); Asts: Joyce Edwards (6)	Pts: Jordan Lee (16); Rebs: Taylor Jones (8); Asts: Rori Harmon (4)

Amalie Arena – Tampa, Florida
Referees: Kyle Bacon, Tiffany Bird, Brenda Pantoja

ESPN

April 4
9:30 p.m

UCLA Bruins 51, UConn Huskies 85
Scoring by quarter: 13–23, 9–19, 15–18, 14–25
Pts: Lauren Betts (26); Rebs: Gabriela Jaquez (8); Asts: Tied (3)	Pts: Sarah Strong (22); Rebs: Tied (8); Asts: Kaitlyn Chen (5)

Amalie Arena – Tampa, Florida
Attendance: 19,731
Referees: Brian Hall, In'Fini Robinson, Joseph Vaszily

==== National championship ====
ABC

April 6
3:00 p.m.

UConn Huskies 82, South Carolina Gamecocks 59
Scoring by quarter: 19–14, 17–12, 26–16, 20–17
Pts: Tied (24); Rebs: Sarah Strong (15); Asts: Sarah Strong (5)	Pts: Tied (10); Rebs: Raven Johnson (7); Asts: MiLaysia Fulwiley (4)

Amalie Arena – Tampa, Florida
Referees: Gina Cross, Maj Forsberg, Felicia Grinter

==== Final Four all-tournament team ====
- Azzi Fudd (MOP) – UConn
- Paige Bueckers – UConn
- Sarah Strong – UConn
- Joyce Edwards – South Carolina
- Lauren Betts – UCLA

== Record by conference ==
Overview of conference performance in the 2025 NCAA Division I women's basketball tournament
Conference	Bids	Record	Win %	FF	R64	R32	S16	E8	F4	CG	NC
Big East	2	6–1	.857	–	2	1	1	1	1	1	1
SEC	10	21-10	.677	–	10	9	6	3	2	1	–
ACC	8	11–8	.579	–	8	6	4	1	-	-	-
Big Ten	12	16–12	.571	1	11	10	3	2	1	–	–
Big 12	7	8–7	.533	1	7	4	2	1	–	–	–
Atlantic 10	2	1–2	.333	–	2	1	–	–	–	–	–
Summit	1	1–1	.500	–	1	1	–	–	–	–	–
Ivy League	3	1–3	.250	2	2	–	–	–	–	–	–
CAA	1	1–1	.500	1	1	–	–	–	–	–	–
SWAC	1	1–1	.500	1	1	–	–	–	–	–	–
American East	1	0–1	.000	–	1	–	–	–	–	–	–
American	1	0–1	.000	–	1	–	–	–	–	–	–
ASUN	1	0–1	.000	–	1	–	–	–	–	–	–
Big Sky	1	0–1	.000	–	1	–	–	–	–	–	–
CUSA	1	0–1	.000	–	1	–	–	–	–	–	–
Horizon	1	0–1	.000	–	1	–	–	–	–	–	–
MAAC	1	0–1	.000	–	1	–	–	–	–	–	–
MAC	1	0–1	.000	–	1	–	–	–	–	–	–
MEAC	1	0–1	.000	–	1	–	–	–	–	–	–
Missouri Valley	1	0–1	.000	–	1	–	–	–	–	–	–
Mountain West	1	0–1	.000	–	1	–	–	–	–	–	–
NEC	1	0–1	.000	–	1	–	–	–	–	–	–
Ohio Valley	1	0–1	.000	–	1	–	–	–	–	–	–
Patriot	1	0–1	.000	–	1	–	–	–	–	–	–
Southern	1	0–1	.000	–	1	–	–	–	–	–	–
Southland	1	0–1	.000	–	1	–	–	–	–	–	–
Sun Belt	1	0–1	.000	–	1	–	–	–	–	–	–
WAC	1	0–1	.000	–	1	–	–	–	–	–	–
WCC	1	0–1	.000	–	1	–	–	–	–	–	–
Big South	1	0–1	.000	1	–	–	–	–	–	–	–
Big West	1	0–1	.000	1	–	–	–	–	–	–	–

- The FF, R64, R32, S16, E8, F4, CG, and NC columns indicate how many teams from each conference were in the first four, round of 64 (first round), round of 32 (second round), Sweet 16, Elite Eight, Final Four, championship game, and national champion, respectively.

== Game summaries and tournament notes ==
The seeds of the teams who qualified for the Elite Eight was the same in both the men’s and women’s tournaments. In both tournaments, there were four #1 seeds, three #2 seeds, and one #3 seed.

=== Tournament upsets ===
Per the NCAA, an upset occurs "when the losing team in an NCAA tournament game was seeded at least five seed lines better than the winning team."

For the first time in NCAA women’s March Madness history since expanding to 64 teams, no team successfully completed an official upset. In addition, this was also the first time no team completed an upset in the Round of 64 alone, meaning no team seeded 11th or lower won in the first round. Both events have never occurred in the men’s tournament since its expansion to 64 teams.

In addition, no team seeded 6th through 10th won their Round of 32 game, ensuring the tournament would have no upsets following the loss of the final such team remaining.

== Media coverage ==
=== Television ===
ESPN broadcast each game of the tournament across either ESPN, ESPN2, ESPNU, ESPNEWS, or ABC. For the third consecutive season, the national championship game aired on ABC.

==== Studio host and analysts ====
- Elle Duncan (host) (first four, first/second rounds, regionals, Final Four, and national championship)
- Kelsey Riggs (host) (first/second rounds and regional semifinals)
- Andraya Carter (analyst) (first four, first/second rounds, regionals, Final Four and national championship)
- Chiney Ogwumike (analyst) (first/second rounds, regionals, Final Four and national championship)
- Muffet McGraw (analyst) (first/second rounds and regional semifinals)
- Meghan McKeown (analyst) (first/second rounds and regional semifinals)
- Lisa Mattingly (rules analyst) (first four, first/second rounds, and regionals)
- Violet Palmer (rules analyst) (first four, first/second rounds, regionals, Final Four, and national championship)

==== Commentary teams ====
First Four

- Eric Frede, Christy Thomaskutty, and Holly Rowe – Los Angeles, California
- Pam Ward and Stephanie White – North Dame, Indiana
- Tiffany Greene and Steffi Sorensen – Austin, Texas
- Angel Gray and Aja Ellison – Chapel Hill, North Carolina

First & second rounds Friday/Sunday (Subregionals)

- Dave O'Brien, Christy Winters-Scott, and Holly Rowe – Los Angeles, California (UCLA)
- Krista Blunk and Mary Murphy – Waco, Texas
- Sam Gore and Tamika Catchings – Lexington, Kentucky
- Beth Mowins and Rebecca Lobo – Storrs, Connecticut
- Courtney Lyle and Carolyn Peck – Columbia, South Carolina
- Jenn Hildreth and Kelly Gramlich – Durham, North Carolina
- Matt Schumacker and Brooke Weisbrod – Columbus, Ohio
- Pam Ward and Stephanie White – Notre Dame, Indiana

First & second rounds Saturday/Monday (Subregionals)

- Roy Philpott and Jimmy Dykes – Baton Rouge, Louisiana
- Wes Durham and Angela Taylor – Raleigh, North Carolina
- Eric Frede, Christy Thomaskutty, and Holly Rowe – Los Angeles, California (USC)
- Kevin Fitzgerald and Kim Adams – Norman, Oklahoma
- Jay Alter and Helen Williams – College Park, Maryland
- Angel Gray and Aja Ellison – Chapel Hill, North Carolina
- Tiffany Greene and Steffi Sorensen – Austin, Texas
- Brenda VanLengen and Andrea Lloyd-Curry – Fort Worth, Texas

Regionals (Sweet 16 and Elite Eight)

- Pam Ward, Stephanie White, and Holly Rowe – Spokane, Washington (Regional 1 – Sweet 16 games only)
- Ryan Ruocco, Rebecca Lobo, and Holly Rowe – Spokane, Washington (Regional 4 – Sweet 16/Regionals 1 & 4 – Elite Eight)
- Courtney Lyle, Carolyn Peck, and Kris Budden – Birmingham, Alabama (Regional 2)
- Beth Mowins, Debbie Antonelli, and Angel Gray – Birmingham, Alabama (Regional 3)

Final Four and National Championship

- Ryan Ruocco, Rebecca Lobo, and Holly Rowe – Tampa, Florida

=== Radio ===
Westwood One will serve as radio broadcaster of the tournament.

Regionals (Sweet 16 and Elite Eight)

- Lance Medow and Kim Adams – Spokane, Washington 1
- Sam Neidermann and Mary Murphy – Spokane, Washington 4
- Danny Reed and Debbie Antonelli – Birmingham, Alabama 2
- Nate Gatter and Isis Young – Birmingham, Alabama 3

Final Four and National Championship

- Ryan Radtke, Debbie Antonelli, and Ros Gold-Onwude – Tampa, Florida

== See also ==
- 2025 NCAA Division I men's basketball tournament
- 2025 NCAA Division II women's basketball tournament
- 2025 NCAA Division III women's basketball tournament
- 2025 NAIA women's basketball tournament
