= 2024–25 Howard Bison women's basketball team =

American college basketball season

2024–25 Howard Bison women's basketball

WNIT, Second Round
- Conference: Mid-Eastern Athletic Conference
- Record: 22–12 (12–2 MEAC)
- Head coach: Ty Grace (10th season)
- Associate head coach: Brian Davis
- Assistant coaches: Donnie Stith; Dr. Jeanne-Marie Wilson
- Home arena: Burr Gymnasium

2024–25 MEAC women's basketball standings
	Conf.				Overall
Team	W		L	PCT	W		L	PCT
Norfolk State †	14	–	0	1.000	30	–	5	.857
Howard	12	–	2	.857	22	–	12	.647
Maryland Eastern Shore	8	–	6	.571	14	–	17	.452
Coppin State	8	–	6	.571	19	–	15	.559
North Carolina Central	6	–	8	.429	9	–	21	.300
Morgan State	6	–	8	.429	13	–	17	.433
Delaware State	1	–	13	.071	5	–	24	.172
South Carolina State	1	–	13	.071	2	–	29	.065
† 2025 MEAC tournament winner

The 2024–25 Howard Bison women's basketball team represented Howard University during the 2024–25 NCAA Division I women's basketball season. The Bison, who were led by tenth-year head coach Ty Grace, played their home games at Burr Gymnasium in Washington, D.C. as members of the Mid-Eastern Athletic Conference (MEAC).

== Previous season ==
The Bison finished the 2023–24 season 15–16, 10–4 in MEAC play, to finish in second place. They defeated Morgan State and North Carolina Central, before falling to top-seeded Norfolk State in the MEAC tournament championship game.

== Preseason ==
On October 8, 2024, the MEAC released their preseason coaches poll. Howard was picked to finish tied for first in the MEAC.

=== Preseason rankings ===
MEAC preseason poll
Predicted finish	Team	Votes (1st place)
T-1	Norfolk State	117 (11)
T-1	Howard	117 (5)
3	Coppin State	79
4	North Carolina Central	78
5	Morgan State	63
6	Maryland Eastern Shore	57
7	Delaware State	43
8	South Carolina State	22

=== Preseason All-MEAC Teams ===
Preseason All-MEAC Teams
Team	Player	Position	Year
First	Tyana Walker	Guard	Senior
First	Destiny Howell	Guard	Graduate student
Second	Kaiya Creek	Forward	Graduate student
Third	Nile Miller	Forward	Junior

== Roster ==
2024–25 Howard Bison women's basketball team
Players
Coaches

Pos.	#	Name	Height	Year	Previous school	Hometown
G	0	Saniyah King	5 ft 7 in (1.7 m)	Fr	Bishop Ireton High School	Washington, D.C.
G	1	Destiny Howell	6 ft 0 in (1.83 m)	GS	St. Francis Prep	Queens, New York
G	3	Nyla Cooper	5 ft 7 in (1.7 m)	Sr	Jack Britt High School	Fayetteville, North Carolina
F	5	Marissa Steel	6 ft 2 in (1.88 m)	Sr	Laurel High School	Laurel, Maryland
F	11	Sa'lah Hemingway	6 ft 0 in (1.83 m)	So	Etiwanda High School	San Bernardino, California
F	12	Amirah Allen	6 ft 1 in (1.85 m)	Sr	Wakefield High School	Raleigh, North Carolina
F	14	Vanessa Blake	6 ft 2 in (1.88 m)	Sr	Radford	Summerville, South Carolina
G	15	April Edwards	5 ft 7 in (1.7 m)	So	Trinity Valley Community College	Little Rock, Arkansas
F	22	Kaiya Creek	5 ft 10 in (1.78 m)	GS	National Christian Academy	Seat Pleasant, Maryland
G	23	Tyana Walker	5 ft 10 in (1.78 m)	RS So	DME Academy	Leawood, Kansas
F	24	Zennia Thomas	6 ft 2 in (1.88 m)	Jr	Kentucky	Cleveland, Ohio
F	25	Nile Miller	6 ft 1 in (1.85 m)	Jr	Woodbury High School	Haddonfield, New Jersey
G	32	Janyah Bohanon	6 ft 0 in (1.83 m)	So	Warrensville High School	Cleveland, Ohio
F	34	Jenesis Perrin	6 ft 5 in (1.96 m)	Jr	Lawrence Academy	Norwich, Connecticut

Head coach

- Ty Grace (New Haven)

Assistant coach(es)

- Brian Davis (Tennessee Tech)
- Donnie Stith (Tulane)
- Dr. Jeanne-Marie Wilson (St. Augustine's)

Legend

- (C) Team captain
- (S) Suspended
- (I) Ineligible
- (W) Walk-on
- Injured
- Current redshirt

Roster
Last update: May 26, 2025

== Schedule and results ==
Date time, TV	Rank^{#}	Opponent^{#}	Result	Record	Site (attendance) city, state
Non-conference regular season
November 4, 2024*; 6:30 pm		at Florida A&M	W 78–66	1–0	Al Lawson Center (2,187); Tallahassee, FL
November 8, 2024*; 6:00 pm		George Washington	W 69–66	2–0	Burr Gymnasium (1,400); Washington, D.C.
November 10, 2024*; 2:00 pm		VCU	L 48–72	2–1	Burr Gymnasium (2,100); Washington, D.C.
November 13, 2024*; 7:00 pm, ESPN+		at Mount St. Mary's	W 39–35	3–1	Knott Arena (518); Emmitsburg, MD
November 20, 2024*; 11:00 am, ESPN+		at East Carolina	L 44–65	3–2	Williams Arena (6,865); Greenville, NC
November 23, 2024*; 2:00 pm, ESPN+		New Hampshire	W 76–55	4–2	Burr Gymnasium (357); Washington, D.C.
November 29, 2024*; 2:00 pm, FloHoops		at William & Mary	W 74–63	5–2	Kaplan Arena (867); Williamsburg, VA
December 1, 2024*; 2:00 pm, ESPN+		Georgetown	L 63–69	5–3	Burr Gymnasium (1,080); Washington, D.C.
December 6, 2024*; 7:00 pm, FloHoops		at Seton Hall	L 63–87	5–4	Walsh Gymnasium (813); South Orange, NJ
December 8, 2024*; 2:00 pm, FloHoops		at Hofstra	L 52–55	5–5	Mack Sports Complex (769); Hempstead, NY
December 13, 2024*; 2:00 pm, ESPN+		Army	W 61–54	6–5	Burr Gymnasium (498); Washington, D.C.
December 17, 2024*; 12:00 pm, ESPN+		Old Dominion	L 58–75	6–6	Burr Gymnasium (996); Washington, D.C.
December 20, 2024*; 11:00 am, ESPN+		at Saint Joseph's; Hawk Classic	L 53–69	6–7	Hagan Arena (2,102); Philadelphia, PA
December 21, 2024*; 11:00 am, ESPN+		vs. Northwestern; Hawk Classic	L 66–68	6–8	Hagan Arena; Philadelphia, PA
December 29, 2024*; 12:30 pm, ESPN+		at American	W 75–46	7–8	Bender Arena (495); Washington, D.C.
MEAC regular season
January 4, 2025; 5:00 pm, ESPN+		Delaware State	W 74–66	8–8 (1–0)	Burr Gymnasium (559); Washington, D.C.
January 11, 2025; 2:00 pm, ESPN+		Morgan State	W 75–56	9–8 (2–0)	Burr Gymnasium (699); Washington, D.C.
January 13, 2025; 5:30 pm, ESPN+		Coppin State	W 76–71	10–8 (3–0)	Burr Gymnasium (831); Washington, D.C.
January 25, 2025; 3:30 pm, ESPN+		at Norfolk State	L 53–69	10–9 (3–1)	Echols Hall (2,692); Norfolk, VA
February 3, 2025; 5:30 pm, ESPN+		South Carolina State	W 68–41	11–9 (4–1)	Burr Gymnasium (831); Washington, D.C.
February 8, 2025; 2:00 pm, ESPN+		North Carolina Central	W 81–64	12–9 (5–1)	Burr Gymnasium (500); Washington, D.C.
February 10, 2025; 5:30 pm		at Maryland Eastern Shore	W 66–56	13–9 (6–1)	Hytche Athletic Center (538); Princess Anne, MD
February 15, 2025; 2:00 pm, ESPN+		at Delaware State	W 62–45	14–9 (7–1)	Memorial Hall (1,500); Dover, DE
February 17, 2025; 5:30 pm, ESPN+		Maryland Eastern Shore	W 72–59	15–9 (8–1)	Burr Gymnasium (1,000); Washington, D.C.
February 22, 2025; 2:00 pm, ESPN+		at Morgan State	W 62–53	16–9 (9–1)	Hill Field House (345); Baltimore, MD
February 24, 2025; 5:30 pm, ESPN+		at Coppin State	W 70–60	17–9 (10–1)	Physical Education Complex (279); Baltimore, MD
March 1, 2025; 2:00 pm, ESPN+		at North Carolina Central	W 74–51	18–9 (11–1)	McDougald–McLendon Arena (858); Durham, NC
March 3, 2025; 5:30 pm		at South Carolina State	W 89–39	19–9 (12–1)	SHM Memorial Center (435); Orangeburg, SC
March 6, 2025; 5:00 pm, ESPNU/ESPN+		Norfolk State	L 56–68	19–10 (12–2)	Burr Gymnasium (889); Washington, D.C.
MEAC tournament
March 12, 2025; 2:00 pm, ESPN+	(2)	vs. (7) Delaware State; Quarterfinals	W 85–49	20–10	Norfolk Scope; Norfolk, VA
March 14, 2025; 2:00 pm, ESPN+	(2)	vs. (3) Maryland Eastern Shore; Semifinals	W 67–59	21–10	Norfolk Scope; Norfolk, VA
March 15, 2025; 4:00 pm, ESPNews/ESPN+	(2)	vs. (1) Norfolk State; Championship	L 56–68	21–11	Norfolk Scope; Norfolk, VA
WNIT
March 21, 2025*; 7:00 pm, ESPN+		Siena; First Round	W 72–62	22–11	Burr Gymnasium (1,030); Washington, D.C.
March 24, 2025*; 7:00 pm, FloHoops		at Charleston; Second Round	L 56–76	22–12	TD Arena (434); Charleston, SC
*Non-conference game. ^{#}Rankings from AP Poll. (#) Tournament seedings in parentheses. All times are in Eastern.
