= 2024–25 Norfolk State Spartans women's basketball team =

American college basketball season

2024–25 Norfolk State Spartans women's basketball
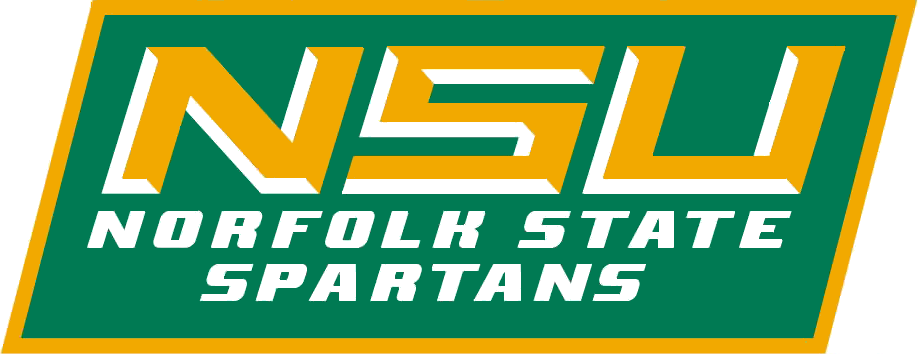

MEAC regular season and tournament champions

NCAA tournament, First Round
- Conference: Mid-Eastern Athletic Conference
- Record: 30–5 (14–0 MEAC)
- Head coach: Larry Vickers (9th season)
- Assistant coaches: Trinese Fox; Chris Godfrey; Chanette Hicks
- Home arena: Echols Hall

2024–25 MEAC women's basketball standings
	Conf.				Overall
Team	W		L	PCT	W		L	PCT
Norfolk State †	14	–	0	1.000	30	–	5	.857
Howard	12	–	2	.857	22	–	12	.647
Maryland Eastern Shore	8	–	6	.571	14	–	17	.452
Coppin State	8	–	6	.571	19	–	15	.559
North Carolina Central	6	–	8	.429	9	–	21	.300
Morgan State	6	–	8	.429	13	–	17	.433
Delaware State	1	–	13	.071	5	–	24	.172
South Carolina State	1	–	13	.071	2	–	29	.065
† 2025 MEAC tournament winner

The 2024–25 Norfolk State Spartans women's basketball team represented Norfolk State University during the 2024–25 NCAA Division I women's basketball season. The Spartans, led by ninth-year head coach Larry Vickers, played their home games at Echols Hall in Norfolk, Virginia as members of the Mid-Eastern Athletic Conference.

== Previous season ==
The Spartans finished the 2023–24 season 27–6, 13–1 in MEAC play to finish as MEAC regular season champions. In the MEAC tournament, they defeated South Carolina State, Coppin State, and Howard to win the MEAC tournament championship and earn the conference's automatic bid into the NCAA tournament where they would lose to the second seed Stanford in the first round.

== Preseason ==
On October 8, 2024, the MEAC released their preseason coaches poll. Norfolk State was picked to finish tied for first in the MEAC.

=== Preseason rankings ===
MEAC preseason poll
Predicted finish	Team	Votes (1st place)
T-1	Norfolk State	117 (11)
T-1	Howard	117 (5)
3	Coppin State	79
4	North Carolina Central	78
5	Morgan State	63
6	Maryland Eastern Shore	57
7	Delaware State	43
8	South Carolina State	22

=== Preseason All-MEAC Teams ===
Preseason All-MEAC Teams
Team	Player	Position	Year
First	Kierra Wheeler	Forward	Senior
First	Diamond Johnson	Guard	Graduate student
Second	Niya Fields	Guard	Graduate student
Third	Anjanae Richardson	Guard	Sophomore

== Roster ==
2024–25 Norfolk State Spartans women's basketball team
Players
Coaches

Pos.	#	Name	Height	Year	Previous school	Hometown
G	1	Da'Brya Clark	5 ft 7 in (1.7 m)	So	Baltimore Polytechnic Institute	Baltimore, Maryland
G	2	Niya Fields	5 ft 8 in (1.73 m)	GS	Putnam Science Academy	Peekskill, New York
PG	3	Diamond Johnson	5 ft 5 in (1.65 m)	GS	NC State	Philadelphia, Pennsylvania
G	4	Anjanae Richardson	5 ft 8 in (1.73 m)	So	Manor High School	Portsmouth, Virginia
G	11	Amari Smith	5 ft 10 in (1.78 m)	So	Morgan State	Newport News, Virginia
F	12	Makoye Diawara	6 ft 0 in (1.83 m)	Sr	Bayonne High School	Bayonne, New Jersey
F	13	Skye Robinson	6 ft 2 in (1.88 m)	RS Jr	VCU	Ruther Glen, Virginia
G	14	Jenesis Hill	5 ft 10 in (1.78 m)	So	Landstown High School	Virginia Beach, Virginia
G	21	Stephanie Mosley	6 ft 0 in (1.83 m)	Jr	Northwest Florida State College	Mansfield, Texas
F	22	Kierra Wheeler	6 ft 1 in (1.85 m)	Sr	Daytona State College	Minneapolis, Minnesota
G	24	Da'naijah Williams	5 ft 9 in (1.75 m)	Sr	St. John's	Brooklyn, New York
F	25	Ciara Bailey	6 ft 2 in (1.88 m)	Jr	Harcum College	Bristol, Pennsylvania

Head coach

- Larry Vickers (Norfolk State)

Assistant coach(es)

- Trinese Fox (South Carolina State)
- Chris Godfrey (St. John's)
- Chanette Hicks (Virginia Tech)

Legend

- (C) Team captain
- (S) Suspended
- (I) Ineligible
- (W) Walk-on
- Injured
- Current redshirt

Roster

== Schedule and results ==
Date time, TV	Rank^{#}	Opponent^{#}	Result	Record	Site (attendance) city, state
Regular season
November 4, 2024*; 6:00 p.m.		William & Mary	W 70–49	1–0	Echols Hall (1,924); Norfolk, VA
November 7, 2024*; 7:00 p.m.		Longwood	W 71–62	2–0	Echols Hall (884); Norfolk, VA
November 10, 2024*; 2:00 p.m., SECN+/ESPN+		at Missouri	W 57–54	3–0	Mizzou Arena (2,623); Columbia, MO
November 13, 2024*; 6:00 p.m., SECN+/ESPN+		at No. 22 Alabama	L 58–68	3–1	Coleman Coliseum (2,303); Tuscaloosa, AL
November 16, 2024*; 5:00 p.m., Monumental		at Hampton; Battle of the Bay	W 62–53	4–1	Hampton Convocation Center (2,752); Hampton, VA
November 20, 2024*; 2:00 p.m.		Radford	W 71–65	5–1	Echols Hall (819); Norfolk, VA
November 23, 2024*; 6:00 p.m., FloHoops		at UNC Wilmington	W 71–52	6–1	Trask Coliseum (667); Wilmington, NC
November 28, 2024*; 1:00 p.m., FloHoops		vs. Washington State; Puerto Rico Shootout	L 60–68	6–2	Roberto Clemente Coliseum (250); San Juan, PR
November 29, 2024*; 1:30 p.m., FloHoops		vs. Wyoming; Puerto Rico Shootout	W 56–47	7–2	Roberto Clemente Coliseum (250); San Juan, PR
November 30, 2024*; 10:00 a.m., FloHoops		vs. Green Bay; Puerto Rico Shootout	L 54–55	7–3	Roberto Clemente Coliseum (250); San Juan, PR
December 7, 2024*; 11:30 a.m., RyzSN		vs. Saint Louis; Coaches vs. Racism Roundball Classic	W 75–66	8–3	Entertainment and Sports Arena; Washington, D.C.
December 12, 2024*; 11:00 a.m.		Shaw	W 90–57	9–3	Echols Hall (3,232); Norfolk, VA
December 15, 2024*; 2:00 p.m., FloHoops		at North Carolina A&T	W 68–59	10–3	Corbett Sports Center; Greensboro, NC
December 18, 2024*; 7:00 p.m.		Drexel	W 68–56	11–3	Echols Hall (500); Norfolk, VA
December 21, 2024*; 12:00 p.m., ACCNX/ESPN+		at No. 19 North Carolina	L 47–90	11–4	Carmichael Arena (2,211); Chapel Hill, NC
December 29, 2024*; 12:00 p.m., SECN+/ESPN+		at Auburn	W 63–57	12–4	Neville Arena (3,012); Auburn, AL
January 4, 2025; 2:00 p.m., ESPN+		Maryland Eastern Shore	W 72–54	13–4 (1–0)	Echols Hall (1,247); Norfolk, VA
January 6, 2025; 2:00 p.m., ESPN+		at Delaware State	W 94–54	14–4 (2–0)	Memorial Hall (600); Dover, DE
January 11, 2025; 2:00 p.m., ESPN+		Coppin State	W 82–66	15–4 (3–0)	Echols Hall (1,136); Norfolk, VA
January 13, 2025; 5:30 p.m., ESPN+		at Morgan State	W 77–69	16–4 (4–0)	Hill Field House (102); Baltimore, MD
January 18, 2025*; 2:00 p.m., ESPN+		Virginia–Lynchburg	W 123–51	17–4	Echols Hall (1,023); Norfolk, VA
January 25, 2025; 3:30 p.m., ESPN+		Howard	W 69–56	18–4 (5–0)	Echols Hall (2,692); Norfolk, VA
February 1, 2025; 2:00 p.m., ESPN+		South Carolina State	W 83–37	19–4 (6–0)	Echols Hall (2,994); Norfolk, VA
February 3, 2025; 4:00 p.m., ESPN+		North Carolina Central	W 88–52	20–4 (7–0)	Echols Hall (1,489); Norfolk, VA
February 15, 2025; 2:00 p.m.		at Maryland Eastern Shore	W 70–48	21–4 (8–0)	Hytche Athletic Center (329); Princess Anne, MD
February 17, 2025; 5:30 p.m., ESPN+		Delaware State	W 92–44	22–4 (9–0)	Echols Hall (2,245); Norfolk, VA
February 22, 2025; 2:00 p.m., ESPN+		at Coppin State	W 76–54	23–4 (10–0)	Physical Education Complex (1,675); Baltimore, MD
February 24, 2025; 5:30 p.m., ESPN+		Morgan State	W 90–46	24–4 (11–0)	Echols Hall (2,896); Norfolk, VA
March 1, 2025; 12:00 p.m.		at South Carolina State	W 88–57	25–4 (12–0)	SHM Memorial Center (235); Orangeburg, SC
March 3, 2025; 5:30 p.m., ESPN+		at North Carolina Central	W 96–57	26–4 (13–0)	McDougald–McLendon Arena (587); Durham, NC
March 6, 2025; 5:00 p.m., ESPNU		at Howard	W 68–56	27–4 (14–0)	Burr Gymnasium (889); Washington, D.C.
MEAC tournament
March 12, 2025; 12:00 pm, ESPN+	(1)	vs. (8) South Carolina State; Quarterfinals	W 81–55	28–4	Norfolk Scope; Norfolk, VA
March 14, 2025; 12:00 pm, ESPN+	(1)	vs. (4) Coppin State; Semifinals	W 72–33	29–4	Norfolk Scope; Norfolk, VA
March 15, 2025; 4:00 pm, ESPNews	(1)	vs. (2) Howard; Championship	W 68–56	30–4	Norfolk Scope; Norfolk, VA
NCAA tournament
March 22, 2025*; 4:00 p.m., ESPN	(13 B2)	at (4 B2) No. 18 Maryland; First round	L 69–82	30–5	Xfinity Center (7,040); College Park, MD
*Non-conference game. ^{#}Rankings from AP Poll. (#) Tournament seedings in parentheses. B2=Birmingham 2. All times are in Eastern.

== See also ==
- 2024–25 Norfolk State Spartans men's basketball team
