= 2024–25 North Carolina Central Eagles women's basketball team =

American college basketball season

2024–25 North Carolina Central Eagles women's basketball
- Conference: Mid-Eastern Athletic Conference
- Record: 9–21 (6–8 MEAC)
- Head coach: Terrence Baxter (2nd season)
- Assistant coaches: N'Dea Bryant; Ashlyn Lockard
- Home arena: McDougald–McLendon Arena

2024–25 MEAC women's basketball standings
	Conf.				Overall
Team	W		L	PCT	W		L	PCT
Norfolk State †	14	–	0	1.000	30	–	5	.857
Howard	12	–	2	.857	22	–	12	.647
Maryland Eastern Shore	8	–	6	.571	14	–	17	.452
Coppin State	8	–	6	.571	19	–	15	.559
North Carolina Central	6	–	8	.429	9	–	21	.300
Morgan State	6	–	8	.429	13	–	17	.433
Delaware State	1	–	13	.071	5	–	24	.172
South Carolina State	1	–	13	.071	2	–	29	.065
† 2025 MEAC tournament winner

The 2024–25 North Carolina Central Eagles women's basketball team represented North Carolina Central University during the 2024–25 NCAA Division I women's basketball season. The Eagles, led by second year head coach Terrence Baxter, played their home games at McDougald–McLendon Arena in Durham, North Carolina as members of the Mid-Eastern Athletic Conference (MEAC).

== Previous season ==
The Eagles finished the 2023–24 season 16–15, 8–6 in MEAC play, to finish in third place. In the MEAC tournament, they defeated Delaware State in the quarterfinals before falling to Norfolk State in the semifinals.

== Preseason ==
On October 8, 2024, the MEAC released their preseason coaches poll. North Carolina Central was picked to finish fourth in the MEAC.

=== Preseason rankings ===
MEAC preseason poll
Predicted finish	Team	Votes (1st place)
T-1	Norfolk State	117 (11)
T-1	Howard	117 (5)
3	Coppin State	79
4	North Carolina Central	78
5	Morgan State	63
6	Maryland Eastern Shore	57
7	Delaware State	43
8	South Carolina State	22

=== Preseason All-MEAC Teams ===
Preseason All-MEAC Teams
Team	Player	Position	Year
Second	Morgan Callahan	Forward	(redshirt) Junior
Third	Kyla Bryant	Guard	Sophomore

== Roster ==
2024–25 North Carolina Central Eagles women's basketball team
Players
Coaches

Pos.	#	Name	Height	Year	Previous school	Hometown
G	0	Aysia Hinton	5 ft 8 in (1.73 m)	So	Maryland Eastern Shore	Durham, NC
F	1	Jada Creech	6 ft 0 in (1.83 m)	So	Winston Salem Christian School	Charlotte, NC
G	2	Victoria Morris	5 ft 9 in (1.75 m)	Fr	South Pointe High School	Rock Hill, SC
F	3	Morgan Callahan	6 ft 1 in (1.85 m)	RS Sr	Zion-Benton Township High School	Beach Park, IL
G	4	Tierney Coleman	5 ft 9 in (1.75 m)	RS Sr	Sam Houston	Missouri City, TX
G	5	Kyla Bryant	5 ft 7 in (1.7 m)	So	Salisbury High School	Salisbury, NC
G	10	Shakiria Foster	5 ft 8 in (1.73 m)	Fr	Lamar County High School	Barnesville, GA
G/F	12	Jada Tiggett	6 ft 2 in (1.88 m)	So	Rancho Christian School	Winchester, CA
F	15	Dianna Blake	6 ft 0 in (1.83 m)	Fr	Ashley Ridge High School	Summerville, SC
F	21	Bradyn Griffin	6 ft 0 in (1.83 m)	Fr	St. Stephen's & St. Agnes School	Bowie, MD
F	22	Laila Lewis	5 ft 10 in (1.78 m)	Fr	Rolesville High School	Raeligh, NC
G	23	Janiah Jones	5 ft 6 in (1.68 m)	Sr	Richard Bland College	Woodbridge, VA
F	24	Aniya Finger	6 ft 1 in (1.85 m)	RS Sr	Hopewell High School	Charlotte, NC
C	33	Nijah Cunningham	6 ft 4 in (1.93 m)	RS Sr	Catawba Valley Community College	Charlotte, NC

Head coach

- Terrence Baxter (Pfeiffer)

Assistant coach(es)

- N'Dea Bryant (North Carolina)
- Ashlyn Lockard (North Carolina Central)

Legend

- (C) Team captain
- (S) Suspended
- (I) Ineligible
- (W) Walk-on
- Injured
- Current redshirt

Roster

== Schedule and results ==
Date time, TV	Rank^{#}	Opponent^{#}	Result	Record	Site (attendance) city, state
Regular season
November 4, 2024*; 7:00 p.m., SECN+/ESPN+		at Georgia	L 52–96	0–1	Stegeman Coliseum (2,588); Athens, GA
November 7, 2024*; 7:00 p.m., ACCNX/ESPN+		at Clemson	L 33–91	0–2	Littlejohn Coliseum (814); Clemson, SC
November 9, 2024*; 2:00 p.m.		Wofford	L 56–75	0–3	McDougald–McLendon Arena (178); Durham, NC
November 11, 2024*; 5:30 p.m.		Chattanooga	L 36–75	0–4	McDougald–McLendon Arena (92); Durham, NC
November 13, 2024*; 7:00 p.m., FloHoops		at Charleston	L 54–84	0–5	TD Arena (322); Charleston, SC
November 18, 2024*; 6:00 p.m., ACCNX/ESPN+		at Florida State	L 57–119	0–6	Donald L. Tucker Center (1,332); Tallahassee, FL
November 21, 2024*; 8:00 p.m., SLN		at South Dakota	L 54–61	0–7	Sanford Coyote Sports Center (1,362); Vermillion, SD
November 25, 2024*; 7:00 p.m., FloHoops		at North Carolina A&T	L 39–62	0–8	Corbett Sports Center (2,084); Greensboro, NC
November 29, 2024*; 2:00 p.m., ACCNX/ESPN+		at No. 16 North Carolina	L 43–119	0–9	Carmichael Arena (2,499); Chapel Hill, NC
December 1, 2024*; 3:00 p.m., SECN+/ESPN+		at No. 7 LSU	L 44–131	0–10	Pete Maravich Assembly Center (10,245); Baton Rouge, LA
December 11, 2024*; 11:00 a.m., ESPN+		Presbyterian	L 63–67	0–11	McDougald–McLendon Arena (75); Durham, NC
December 11, 2024*; 2:00 p.m., SECN+/ESPN+		at No. 19 Tennessee	L 59–139	0–12	Thompson–Boling Arena (9,305); Knoxville, TN
December 20, 2024*; 12:00 p.m., ESPN+		at Winthrop	W 76–71	1–12	Winthrop Coliseum (409); Rock Hill, SC
December 30, 2024*; 1:00 p.m., ESPN+		Furman	W 77–76	2–12	McDougald–McLendon Arena (345); Durham, NC
January 4, 2025; 2:00 p.m., ESPN+		at Coppin State	L 66–69	2–13 (0–1)	Physical Education Complex (211); Baltimore, MD
January 7, 2025; 2:00 p.m., ESPN+		at Morgan State	L 79–84	2–14 (0–2)	Hill Field House (63); Baltimore, MD
January 11, 2025; 2:00 p.m., ESPN+		Maryland Eastern Shore	W 92–86 ^{2OT}	3–14 (1–2)	McDougald–McLendon Arena (1,243); Durham, NC
January 13, 2025; 5:30 p.m., ESPN+		Delaware State	W 76–71	4–14 (2–2)	McDougald–McLendon Arena (1,367); Durham, NC
January 23, 2025*; 6:00 p.m.		at Pfeiffer	W 90–55	5–14	Merner Gym (325); Misenheimer, NC
January 25, 2025; 2:00 p.m., ESPN+		South Carolina State	W 71–56	6–14 (3–2)	McDougald–McLendon Arena (2,122); Durham, NC
February 3, 2025; 4:00 p.m., ESPN+		at Norfolk State	L 52–88	6–15 (3–3)	Echols Hall (1,489); Norfolk, VA
February 8, 2025; 2:00 p.m., ESPN+		at Howard	L 64–81	6–16 (3–4)	Burr Gymnasium (500); Washington, D.C.
February 15, 2025; 2:00 p.m., ESPN+		Coppin State	L 53–63	6–17 (3–5)	McDougald–McLendon Arena (340); Durham, NC
February 17, 2025; 5:30 p.m., ESPN+		Morgan State	W 71–53	7–17 (4–5)	McDougald–McLendon Arena (521); Durham, NC
February 24, 2025; 5:30 p.m., ESPN+		at Delaware State	W 82–47	8–17 (5–5)	Memorial Hall (196); Dover, DE
February 26, 2025; 5:30 p.m.		at Maryland Eastern Shore	L 57–67	8–18 (5–6)	Hytche Athletic Center (389); Princess Anne, MD
March 1, 2025; 2:00 p.m., ESPN+		Howard	L 51–74	8–19 (5–7)	McDougald–McLendon Arena (858); Durham, NC
March 3, 2025; 5:30 p.m., ESPN+		Norfolk State	L 57–96	8–20 (5–8)	McDougald–McLendon Arena (587); Durham, NC
March 6, 2025; 5:30 p.m., ESPN+		at South Carolina State	W 68–63	9–20 (6–8)	SHM Memorial Center (458); Orangeburg, SC
MEAC tournament
March 13, 2025; 12:00 p.m., ESPN+	(5)	vs. (4) Coppin State; Quarterfinals	L 48–57	9–21	Norfolk Scope; Norfolk, VA
*Non-conference game. ^{#}Rankings from AP poll. (#) Tournament seedings in parentheses. All times are in Eastern.
