= 2024–25 South Carolina State Lady Bulldogs basketball team =

American college basketball season

2024–25 South Carolina State Lady Bulldogs basketball
- Conference: Mid-Eastern Athletic Conference
- Record: 2–29 (1–13 MEAC)
- Head coach: Tim Eatman (3rd season)
- Assistant coaches: Regina Garrett; Ervin Monier; Jaquanna Murray; Jordan Wallace
- Home arena: Bender Arena

2024–25 MEAC women's basketball standings
	Conf.				Overall
Team	W		L	PCT	W		L	PCT
Norfolk State †	14	–	0	1.000	30	–	5	.857
Howard	12	–	2	.857	22	–	12	.647
Maryland Eastern Shore	8	–	6	.571	14	–	17	.452
Coppin State	8	–	6	.571	19	–	15	.559
North Carolina Central	6	–	8	.429	9	–	21	.300
Morgan State	6	–	8	.429	13	–	17	.433
Delaware State	1	–	13	.071	5	–	24	.172
South Carolina State	1	–	13	.071	2	–	29	.065
† 2025 MEAC tournament winner

The 2024–25 South Carolina State Lady Bulldogs basketball team represented South Carolina State University during the 2024–25 NCAA Division I women's basketball season. The Lady Bulldogs, who were led by third-year head coach Tim Eatman, played their home games at SHM Memorial Center in Orangeburg, South Carolina as members of the Mid-Eastern Athletic Conference (MEAC).

The Lady Bulldogs finished the season 2–29, 1–13 in MEAC play, to finish in a tie for seventh (last) place. For the fourth year in a row, they were defeated by top-seeded and eventual tournament champions Norfolk State in the quarterfinals of the MEAC tournament.

== Previous season ==
The Lady Bulldogs finished the 2023–24 season 2–26, 1–12 in MEAC play, to finish in eighth (last) place. For the third consecutive year, they were defeated by top-seeded and eventual tournament champions Norfolk State in the first round of the MEAC tournament.

== Preseason ==
On October 8, 2024, the MEAC released their preseason coaches poll. South Carolina State was picked to finish last in the MEAC.

=== Preseason rankings ===
MEAC preseason poll
Predicted finish	Team	Votes (1st place)
T–1	Norfolk State	117 (11)
T–1	Howard	117 (5)
3	Coppin State	79
4	North Carolina Central	78
5	Morgan State	63
6	Maryland Eastern Shore	57
7	Delaware State	43
8	South Carolina State	22

=== Preseason All-MEAC Teams ===
No Lady Bulldogs were named to the Preseason All-MEAC First, Second or Third teams.

== Roster ==
2024–25 South Carolina State Bulldogs women's basketball team
Players
Coaches

Pos.	#	Name	Height	Year	Previous school	Hometown
G	0	Janiah Hinton	5 ft 8 in (1.73 m)	RS Jr	Saltillo High School	Tupelo, MS
G	1	Mekayla Lumpkin	5 ft 4 in (1.63 m)	Sr	Ramsay High School	Birmingham, AL
F	2	Jennesse Byrd	5 ft 8 in (1.73 m)	Fr	East High School	Denver, CO
G	3	Monajah Ford	5 ft 8 in (1.73 m)	So	Discovery High School	Winter Haven, FL
G/F	4	Taniya McGowan	5 ft 10 in (1.78 m)	So	Archer High School	Horn Lake, MS
G/F	8	Kimora Smith	5 ft 10 in (1.78 m)	Fr	St. Francis Prep	Queens, NY
G	9	Angie Juste-Jean	5 ft 8 in (1.73 m)	Jr	Coastal Carolina	Montreal, QB
G	10	Ali Hardwell	5 ft 5 in (1.65 m)	Jr	Cochise College	Seattle, WA
G/F	12	Ariana Perry	5 ft 9 in (1.75 m)	So	Alabama State	Charlotte, NC
F	13	Rakyha Reid	5 ft 9 in (1.75 m)	Sr	Oakland Technical High School	Oakland, CA
G	14	Shaunice Reed	5 ft 4 in (1.63 m)	Jr	Cochise College	Seattle, WA
F	15	Justice Tramble	6 ft 0 in (1.83 m)	Fr	Canton High School	Detroit, MI
F	21	Jhaven Meade	6 ft 4 in (1.93 m)	So	Franklin County High School	Frankfort, KY
G	23	Jada Morgan	5 ft 8 in (1.73 m)	So	Warner Robins High School	Macon, GA
F	24	Heaven Harper	6 ft 3 in (1.91 m)	So	Monsignor Scanlan High School	The Bronx, NY

Head coach

- Tim Eatman (Talladega)

Assistant coach(es)

- Regina Garrett (South Carolina State)
- Ervin Monier (St. Mary's (TX))
- Jaquanna Murray (South Carolina State)
- Jordan Wallace (Rutgers)

Legend

- (C) Team captain
- (S) Suspended
- (I) Ineligible
- (W) Walk-on
- Injured
- Current redshirt

Roster
Last update: June 10, 2025

== Schedule and results ==
Date time, TV	Rank^{#}	Opponent^{#}	Result	Record	Site (attendance) city, state
Non-conference regular season
November 4, 2024*; 5:30 p.m.		Furman	L 54–60	0–1	SHM Memorial Center (511); Orangeburg, SC
November 8, 2024*; 6:30 p.m.		Presbyterian	W 59–54	1–1	SHM Memorial Center; Orangeburg, SC
November 13, 2024*; 6:30 p.m.		USC Upstate	L 52–60	1–2	SHM Memorial Center (353); Orangeburg, SC
November 15, 2024*; 7:00 p.m.		Jacksonville State	L 41–72	1–3	SHM Memorial Center (100); Orangeburg, SC
November 20, 2024*; 9:00 p.m., MWN		at New Mexico	L 38–80	1–4	The Pit (4,423); Albuquerque, NM
November 24, 2024*; 2:00 p.m.		UNC Greensboro	L 35–53	1–5	SHM Memorial Center; Orangeburg, SC
November 26, 2024*; 6:00 p.m., ESPN+		at Queens	L 57–73	1–6	Curry Arena (226); Charlotte, NC
November 29, 2024*; 2:00 p.m., ESPN+		at West Georgia	L 57–74	1–7	The Coliseum (284); Carrollton, GA
November 30, 2024*; 1:00 p.m., ESPN+		at Loyola Chicago	L 39–67	1–8	Joseph J. Gentile Arena (297); Chicago, IL
December 6, 2024*; 11:00 a.m., ESPN+		at Longwood; Shirley Duncan Classic	L 60–67	1–9	Joan Perry Brock Center (1,837); Farmville, VA
December 7, 2024*; 6:00 p.m., ESPN+		vs. McNeese; Shirley Duncan Classic	L 38–62	1–10	Joan Perry Brock Center; Farmville, VA
December 8, 2024*; 1:00 p.m., ESPN+		vs. William & Mary; Shirley Duncan Classic	L 65–70	1–11	Joan Perry Brock Center; Farmville, VA
December 11, 2024*; 6:00 p.m., ESPN+		at Winthrop	L 46–55	1–12	Rock Hill Sports & Event Center (268); Rock Hill, SC
December 17, 2024*; 6:30 p.m.		Charleston Southern	L 50–78	1–13	SHM Memorial Center (135); Orangeburg, SC
December 21, 2024*; 1:00 p.m., ESPN+		at Coastal Carolina	L 58–104	1–14	HTC Center; Conway, SC
December 29, 2024*; 3:00 p.m., SECN+		at Mississippi State	L 48–95	1–15	Humphrey Coliseum (4,271); Starkville, MS
MEAC regular season
January 4, 2025; 2:00 p.m., ESPN+		at Morgan State	L 54–55	1–16 (0–1)	Hill Field House (67); Baltimore, MD
January 6, 2025; 5:30 p.m., ESPN+		at Coppin State	L 38–84	1–17 (0–2)	Physical Education Complex (130); Baltimore, MD
January 11, 2025; 2:00 p.m.		Delaware State	W 68–62	2–17 (1–2)	SHM Memorial Center (352); Orangeburg, SC
January 13, 2025; 5:30 p.m.		Maryland Eastern Shore	L 55–63	2–18 (1–3)	SHM Memorial Center (252); Orangeburg, SC
January 25, 2025; 2:00 p.m., ESPN+		at North Carolina Central	L 56–71	2–19 (1–4)	McDougald–McLendon Arena (2,122); Durham, NC
February 1, 2025; 2:00 p.m., ESPN+		at Norfolk State	L 37–83	2–20 (1–5)	Echols Hall (2,994); Norfolk, VA
February 3, 2025; 5:30 p.m., ESPN+		at Howard	L 41–68	2–21 (1–6)	Burr Gymnasium (831); Washington, D.C.
February 15, 2025; 2:00 p.m.		Morgan State	L 55–60	2–22 (1–7)	SHM Memorial Center (568); Orangeburg, SC
February 17, 2025; 5:30 p.m.		Coppin State	L 45–57	2–23 (1–8)	SHM Memorial Center (251); Orangeburg, SC
February 22, 2025; 2:00 p.m., ESPN+		at Delaware State	L 56–77	2–24 (1–9)	Memorial Hall (201); Dover, DE
February 24, 2025; 5:30 p.m.		at Maryland Eastern Shore	L 29–70	2–25 (1–10)	Hytche Athletic Center (350); Princess Anne, MD
March 1, 2025; 12:00 p.m.		Norfolk State	L 57–88	2–26 (1–11)	SHM Memorial Center (235); Orangeburg, SC
March 3, 2025; 5:30 p.m.		Howard	L 39–89	2–27 (1–12)	SHM Memorial Center (435); Orangeburg, SC
March 6, 2025; 5:30 p.m.		North Carolina Central	L 63–68	2–28 (1–13)	SHM Memorial Center (458); Orangeburg, SC
MEAC tournament
March 12, 2025; 12:00 p.m., ESPN+	(8)	vs. (1) Norfolk State; Quarterfinals	L 55–81	2–29	Norfolk Scope; Norfolk, VA
*Non-conference game. ^{#}Rankings from AP poll. (#) Tournament seedings in parentheses. All times are in Eastern.
