= 2024–25 Arizona State Sun Devils women's basketball team =

American college basketball season

2024–25 Arizona State Sun Devils women's basketball
- Conference: Big 12 Conference
- Record: 10–22 (3–15 Big 12)
- Head coach: Natasha Adair (3rd season)
- Associate head coach: Darrell Mosley
- Assistant coaches: Mykala Walker; Camille Collier; Yvonne Sanchez; E.C. Hill
- Home arena: Desert Financial Arena

2024–25 Big 12 Conference women's basketball standings
	Conf.				Overall
Team	W		L	PCT	W		L	PCT
No. 6 TCU †	16	–	2	.889	34	–	4	.895
No. 14 Baylor	15	–	3	.833	28	–	8	.778
No. 17 Oklahoma State	14	–	4	.778	25	–	7	.781
No. 16 West Virginia	13	–	5	.722	25	–	8	.758
No. 19 Kansas State	13	–	5	.722	28	–	8	.778
Utah	13	–	5	.722	22	–	9	.710
Iowa State	12	–	6	.667	23	–	12	.657
Arizona	10	–	8	.556	19	–	14	.576
Colorado	9	–	9	.500	21	–	13	.618
Cincinnati	7	–	11	.389	15	–	14	.517
Kansas	6	–	12	.333	16	–	14	.533
BYU	4	–	14	.222	13	–	17	.433
UCF	4	–	14	.222	12	–	18	.400
Texas Tech	4	–	14	.222	19	–	18	.514
Arizona State	3	–	15	.167	10	–	22	.313
Houston	1	–	17	.056	5	–	25	.167
† 2025 Big 12 tournament winner Rankings from AP poll

The 2024–25 Arizona State women's basketball team represented Arizona State University during the 2024–25 NCAA Division I women's basketball season. The Sun Devils were led by third-year head coach Natasha Adair. They played their home games at the Desert Financial Arena and competed as first year members of the Big 12 Conference. They finished the season 11–22, 3–15 in Big 12 play to finish in fifteenth place. They defeated Cincinnati in the first round of the Big 12 women's tournament before losing to Iowa State in the second round.

Arizona State fired Adair on March 8, 2025 after a 29–62 record in three seasons. Grand Canyon head coach Molly Miller was hired by the Sun Devils on March 22.

== Previous season ==
The Sun Devils finished the season 11–20, 3–15 in Pac-12 play to finish in eleventh place. They lost in the first round of the Pac-12 women's tournament to Utah.

This was also the last season that Arizona State would play in the Pac-12 Conference before moving to the Big 12 Conference.

== Offseason ==
=== Departures ===
Arizona State departures
Name	Num	Pos.	Height	Year	Hometown	Reason for departure
Jaylah Robinson	0	G	5'11"	Sophomore	Philadelphia, PA	Left the team
Jaddan Simmons	2	G	5'9"	Senior	Green Bay, WI	Transferred to Michigan State
Trayanna Crisp	4	G	5'8"	Sophomore	Goodyear, AZ	Transferred to North Carolina
Marina Radocaj	10	G/F	6'2"	Freshman	Richmond, BC	Transferred to Pacific
Treasure Hunt	12	G	6'2"	Senior	Chattanooga, TN	Graduated
Sandra Magolico	13	F	6'2"	Junior	Maputo, Mozambique	Transferred to SMU
Kiley Sours-Miller	20	C	6'4"	Freshman	Surprise, AZ	Transferred to Pima CC
Journey Thompson	22	F	6'3"	Sophomore	McMurray, PA	Transferred to Syracuse
Isadora Sousa	44	F	6'0"	Graduate student	São Paulo, Brazil	Graduated

=== Incoming transfers ===
Arizona State incoming transfers
Name	Num	Pos.	Height	Year	Hometown	Previous school
Kennedy Basham	0	F	6'7"	Sophomore	Phoenix, AZ	Oregon
Jyah LoVett	4	G	5'8"	Sophomore	San Gabriel, CA	San Jose State
Jazion Jackson	7	G	5'9"	Graduate student	Dallas, TX	Texas Tech
Kennedy Fauntleroy	10	G	5'7"	Sophomore	Upper Malboro, MD	Oklahoma State
Makayla Moore	12	G	6'0"	Junior	San Jose, CA	Seattle
Heavenly Greer	15	C	6'3"	(redshirt) Senior	Phoenix, AZ	Kansas State
Nevaeh Parkinson	32	C	6'3"	Graduate student	Dallas, TX	UC Irvine

==== Recruiting ====
There was no recruiting class of 2023.

== Roster ==
2024–25 Arizona State Sun Devils women's basketball team
Players
Coaches

Pos.	#	Name	Height	Year	Previous school	Hometown
F	0	Kennedy Basham	6 ft 7 in (2.01 m)	Jr	PHH Prep; Oregon	Phoenix, AZ
F	1	Kadidia Toure	6 ft 3 in (1.91 m)	Jr	Our Lady of Good Counsel HS; James Madison	Silver Spring, MD
G	3	Tyi Skinner	5 ft 5 in (1.65 m)	GS	TPLS Christian Academy; Delaware	Washington, D.C.
G	4	Jyah LoVett	5 ft 8 in (1.73 m)	So	Bella Vista College Preparatory; San Jose State	San Gabriel, CA
G	7	Jazion Jackson	5 ft 9 in (1.75 m)	GS	Skyline; Texas Tech	Dallas, TX
G	10	Kennedy Fauntleroy	5 ft 7 in (1.7 m)	Jr	New Hope Academy; Oklahoma State	Upper Marlboro, MD
G	12	Makayla Moore	6 ft 0 in (1.83 m)	Jr	Archbishop Mitty HS; Seattle	San Jose, CA
G/F	13	Maggie Besselink	6 ft 3 in (1.91 m)	GS	Holy Cross HS	Kingston, ON
F	15	Heavenly Greer	6 ft 3 in (1.91 m)	RS Sr	Ganesha High School; Kansas State	Phoenix, AZ
F	21	Hanna Miller	6 ft 2 in (1.88 m)	Jr	Aberdeen Christian School; Dodge City CC	Aberdeen, SD
C	22	Timya Grice	6 ft 5 in (1.96 m)	Fr	Taylor HS	Katy, TX
G	23	Jalyn Brown	6 ft 0 in (1.83 m)	Jr	Saint Frances Academy; Louisville	Baltimore, MD
F	24	Mallory Miller	6 ft 4 in (1.93 m)	So	Wolsey-Wessington HS	Aberdeen, SD
G	25	Adison Novosel	5 ft 11 in (1.8 m)	Sr	Revere HS; Saint Francis (PA)	Richfield, OH
F	30	Morasha Wiggins	6 ft 0 in (1.83 m)	Sr	Kalamazoo HS	Kalamazoo, MI
C	32	Nevaeh Parkinson	6 ft 3 in (1.91 m)	GS	John Paul II HS; UC Irvine	Dallas, TX

Head coach

- Natasha Adair (South Florida)

Assistant coach(es)

- Darrell Mosley (Lincoln (PA))
- Mykala Walker (Wake Forest)
- Camille Collier (Wake Forest)
- Yvonne Sanchez (Alliant)
- E.C. Hill (Northern Illinois)

Legend

- (C) Team captain
- (S) Suspended
- (I) Ineligible
- (W) Walk-on
- Injured
- Current redshirt

Roster

== Schedule and results ==
Date time, TV	Rank^{#}	Opponent^{#}	Result	Record	High points	High rebounds	High assists	Site (attendance) city, state
Regular season
November 4, 2024*; 6:30 p.m., ESPN+		Jacksonville State	W 74–66	1–0	30 – Skinner	10 – Basham	5 – Skinner	Desert Financial Arena (1,641); Tempe, AZ
November 8, 2024*; 3:00 p.m., ESPN+		Arkansas State	L 96–100	1–1	24 – Brown	6 – Tied	8 – Skinner	Desert Financial Arena (1,149); Tempe, AZ
November 14, 2024*; 4:30 p.m., ESPN+		vs. Grand Canyon; Jerry Colangelo Hall of Fame Series	L 59–70	1–2	15 – Skinner	13 – Basham	4 – Skinner	Footprint Center; Phoenix, AZ
November 16, 2024*; 3:30 p.m., ESPN+		SMU; Briann January Classic	W 80–73	2–2	26 – Skinner	13 – Jackson	5 – Brown	Desert Financial Arena (1,356); Tempe, AZ
November 17, 2024*; 2:30 p.m., ESPN+		Oregon State; Briann January Classic	W 79–60	3–2	21 – Skinner	10 – Tied	3 – Tied	Desert Financial Arena (1,738); Tempe, AZ
November 26, 2024*; 2:30 p.m., BallerTV		vs. No. 14 Kentucky; Music City Classic	L 61–77	3–3	16 – Brown	9 – Parkinson	5 – Skinner	Trojan Fieldhouse (611); Nashville, TN
November 27, 2024*; 10:00 a.m., BallerTV		vs. South Dakota; Music City Classic	W 95–88	4–3	26 – Parkinson	7 – Brown	7 – Skinner	Trojan Fieldhouse (218); Nashville, TN
December 5, 2024*; 5:00 p.m., ESPN+		at Coppin State	L 68–74 ^{OT}	4–4	17 – Brown	10 – Parkinson	3 – Tied	Physical Education Complex (511); Baltimore, MD
December 7, 2024*; 11:45 a.m., RyzSN		vs. Maryland Eastern Shore; Coaches vs Racism Roundball Classic	W 64–57	5–4	13 – Tied	6 – Jackson	7 – Fauntleroy	Entertainment and Sports Arena; Washington, D.C.
December 15, 2024*; 3:00 p.m., ESPN+		at UC Davis	L 50–57	5–5	21 – Brown	12 – Besselink	2 – Tied	University Credit Union Center (521); Davis, CA
December 17, 2024*; 12:00 p.m., ESPN+		at San Francisco	L 64–67	5–6	27 – Skinner	7 – Basham	2 – Skinner	Sobrato Center; San Francisco, CA
December 21, 2024; 4:00 p.m., ESPN+		at Utah	L 82–102	5–7 (0–1)	22 – Brown	7 – Fauntleroy	7 – Fauntleroy	Jon M. Huntsman Center (3,787); Salt Lake City, UT
December 30, 2024*; 1:00 p.m., ESPN+		Penn	W 73–67	6–7	22 – Parkinson	13 – Parkinson	7 – LoVett	Mullett Arena (1,219); Tempe, AZ
January 1, 2025; 4:00 p.m., ESPN+		Texas Tech	W 79–61	7–7 (1–1)	17 – Fauntleroy	8 – Tied	6 – Tied	Desert Financial Arena (1,277); Tempe, AZ
January 4, 2025; 5:00 p.m., ESPN+		at Houston	W 69–60	8–7 (2–1)	18 – Skinner	12 – Parkinson	3 – Jackson	Fertitta Center (904); Houston, TX
January 8, 2025; 6:30 p.m., ESPN+		Iowa State	L 83–90	8–8 (2–2)	20 – Brown	9 – Parkinson	5 – LoVett	Mullett Arena (1,640); Tempe, AZ
January 11, 2025; 3:30 p.m., ESPN+		Baylor	L 59–78	8–9 (2–3)	21 – Brown	12 – Parkinson	5 – Brown	Desert Financial Arena; Tempe, AZ
January 16, 2025; 5:30 p.m., ESPN+		at Kansas	L 52–75	8–10 (2–4)	18 – Skinner	7 – Jackson	3 – Skinner	Allen Fieldhouse (3,020); Lawrence, KS
January 19, 2025; 12:00 p.m., ESPN+		at No. 11 Kansas State	L 69–81	8–11 (2–5)	32 – Brown	6 – Parkinson	3 – Brown	Bramlage Coliseum (6,879); Manhattan, KS
January 22, 2025; 6:30 p.m., ESPN+		No. 16 West Virginia	L 59–89	8–12 (2–6)	16 – Brown	7 – Fauntleroy	2 – Tied	Mullett Arena (1,571); Tempe, AZ
January 25, 2025; 4:00 p.m., ESPN+		Cincinnati	L 66–73	8–13 (2–7)	25 – Brown	9 – Brown	4 – Skinner	Desert Financial Arena (12,762); Tempe, AZ
January 29, 2025; 5:30 p.m., ESPN+		at No. 24 Oklahoma State	L 71–83	8–14 (2–8)	23 – Skinner	11 – Brown	6 – Skinner	Gallagher-Iba Arena (2,508); Stillwater, OK
February 1, 2025; 6:30 p.m., ESPN+		BYU	L 67–77	8–15 (2–9)	17 – Parkinson	6 – Brown	6 – Brown	Desert Financial Arena (2,590); Tempe, AZ
February 8, 2025; 2:00 p.m., ESPN+		at Arizona	L 59-66	8–16 (2—10)	19 – Skinner	10 – Basham	3 – Skinner	McKale Center (8,370); Tucson, AZ
February 12, 2025; 5:00 p.m., ESPN+		at UCF	L 76–85	8–17 (2–11)	22 – Brown	11 – Basham	5 – Moore	Addition Financial Arena (1,002); Orlando, FL
February 15, 2025; 2:00 p.m., ESPN+		Utah	L 62–98	8–18 (2–12)	20 – Skinner	7 – Basham	3 – Brown	Desert Financial Arena; Tempe, AZ
February 19, 2025; 6:30 p.m., ESPN+		No. 10 TCU	L 66–82	8–19 (2–13)	25 – Skinner	9 – Basham	3 – Brown	Mullett Arena (2,848); Tempe, AZ
February 22, 2025; 4:00 p.m., ESPN+		at BYU	W 85–73 ^{OT}	9–19 (3–13)	23 – Brown	9 – Brown	6 – Skinner	Marriott Center (3,037); Provo, UT
February 26, 2025; 7:00 p.m., ESPN+		at Colorado	L 54–89	9–20 (3–14)	17 – Brown	8 – Basham	3 – Tied	CU Events Center (2,724); Boulder, CO
March 1, 2025; 6:00 p.m., ESPN+		Arizona	L 59–71	9–21 (3–15)	20 – Skinner	19 – Parkinson	6 – Brown	Desert Financial Arena (3,136); Tempe, AZ
Big 12 Conference Tournament
March 5, 2025; 4:30 p.m., ESPN+	(15)	vs. (10) Cincinnati; First Round	W 82–75	10–21	27 – Brown	10 – Basham	4 – Brown	T-Mobile Center; Kansas City, MO
March 6, 2025; 4:30 p.m., ESPN+	(15)	vs. (7) Iowa State; Second Round	L 88–96	10–22	26 – Brown	6 – Miller	4 – Skinner	T-Mobile Center; Kansas City, MO
*Non-conference game. ^{#}Rankings from AP Poll. (#) Tournament seedings in parentheses. All times are in Mountain Time.

== Rankings ==
Ranking movements Legend: — = Not ranked
	Week																				
Poll	Pre	1	2	3	4	5	6	7	8	9	10	11	12	13	14	15	16	17	18	19	Final
AP	—	—*	—																		Not released
Coaches	—	—*	—																		

*The preseason and Week 1 polls were the same.
^Coaches did not release a Week 2 poll.

== See also ==
- 2024–25 Arizona State Sun Devils men's basketball team
