= 2025 MEAC women's basketball tournament =

US collegiate basketball tournament

- Classification: Division I
- Season: 2024–25
- Teams: 8
- Site: Norfolk Scope; Norfolk, Virginia
- Television: ESPN+, ESPNews

2024–25 MEAC women's basketball standings
| | Conf. | | | | Overall |
| Team | W | | L | PCT | W | | L | PCT |
|---|---|---|---|---|---|---|---|---|
| Norfolk State † | 14 | – | 0 | 1.000 | 30 | – | 5 | .857 |
| Howard | 12 | – | 2 | .857 | 22 | – | 12 | .647 |
| Maryland Eastern Shore | 8 | – | 6 | .571 | 14 | – | 17 | .452 |
| Coppin State | 8 | – | 6 | .571 | 19 | – | 15 | .559 |
| North Carolina Central | 6 | – | 8 | .429 | 9 | – | 21 | .300 |
| Morgan State | 6 | – | 8 | .429 | 13 | – | 17 | .433 |
| Delaware State | 1 | – | 13 | .071 | 5 | – | 24 | .172 |
| South Carolina State | 1 | – | 13 | .071 | 2 | – | 29 | .065 |
† 2025 MEAC tournament winner

The 2025 MEAC women's basketball tournament is the postseason women's basketball tournament for the 2024–25 season in the Mid-Eastern Athletic Conference (MEAC). The tournament will take place during March 12–15, 2025, at Norfolk Scope in Norfolk, Virginia. The tournament winner will receive the conference's automatic invitation to the 2025 NCAA Division I women's basketball tournament.

== Seeds ==
All eight-conference members are eligible for the tournament and will be seeded by record within the conference, with a tiebreaker system to seed teams with identical conference records.

| Seed | School | Conference | Tiebreaker |
|---|---|---|---|
| 1 | Norfolk State | 14–0 | |
| 2 | Howard | 12–2 | |
| 3 | Maryland Eastern Shore | 8–6 | +1 head-to-head point differential |
| 4 | Coppin State | 8–6 | -1 head-to-head point differential |
| 5 | North Carolina Central | 6–8 | +13 head-to-head point differential |
| 6 | Morgan State | 6–8 | -13 head-to-head point differential |
| 7 | Delaware State | 1–13 | +15 head-to-head point differential |
| 8 | South Carolina State | 1–13 | -15 head-to-head point differential |

== Schedule ==
| Game | Time* | Matchup^{#} | Score | Television |
Quarterfinals – Wednesday, March 12
| 1 | 12:00 p.m. | No. 1 Norfolk State vs. No. 8 South Carolina State | 81–55 | ESPN+ |
| 2 | 2:00 p.m. | No. 2 Howard vs. No. 7 Delaware State | 85–49 | ESPN+ |
Quarterfinals – Thursday, March 13
| 3 | 12:00 p.m. | No. 4 Coppin State vs. No. 5 North Carolina Central | 57–48 | ESPN+ |
| 4 | 2:00 p.m. | No. 3 Maryland Eastern Shore vs. No. 6 Morgan State | 74–67 | ESPN+ |
Semifinals – Friday, March 14
| 5 | 12:00 p.m. | No. 1 Norfolk State vs. No. 4 Coppin State | 72–33 | ESPN+ |
| 6 | 2:00 p.m. | No. 2 Howard vs. No 3. Maryland Eastern Shore | 67–59 | ESPN+ |
Championship – Saturday, March 15
| 7 | 4:00 p.m. | No. 1 Norfolk State vs. No. 2 Howard | 68–56 | ESPNews |
*Game times in EDT. #-Rankings denote tournament seeding.

== Bracket ==
Quarterfinals; March 12–13; ESPN+
1 | Norfolk State | 81
8 | South Carolina State | 55
4 | Coppin State | 57
5 | North Carolina Central | 48
2 | Howard | 85
7 | Delaware State | 49
3 | Maryland Eastern Shore | 74
6 | Morgan State | 67

Semifinals; March 14; ESPN+
1 | Norfolk State | 72
4 | Coppin State | 33
2 | Howard | 67
3 | Maryland Eastern Shore | 59

Championship; March 15; ESPNews
1 | Norfolk State | 68
2 | Howard | 56
