= 2024–25 Morgan State Lady Bears basketball team =

American college basketball season

2024–25 Morgan State Lady Bears basketball
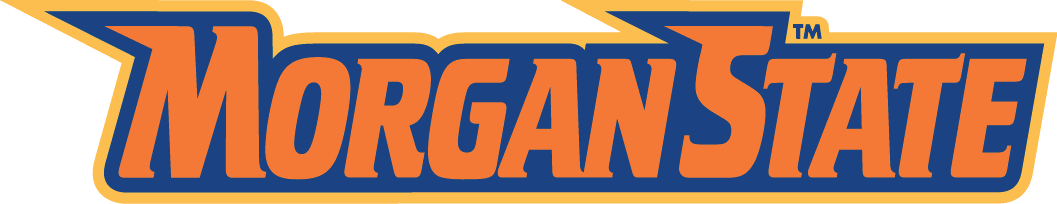
- Conference: Mid-Eastern Athletic Conference
- Record: 13–17 (6–8 MEAC)
- Head coach: Ed Davis Jr. (9th season)
- Associate head coach: Donchez Graham
- Assistant coaches: Tykyrah Williams; Janelle Silver-Martin
- Home arena: Hill Field House

2024–25 MEAC women's basketball standings
	Conf.				Overall
Team	W		L	PCT	W		L	PCT
Norfolk State †	14	–	0	1.000	30	–	5	.857
Howard	12	–	2	.857	22	–	12	.647
Maryland Eastern Shore	8	–	6	.571	14	–	17	.452
Coppin State	8	–	6	.571	19	–	15	.559
North Carolina Central	6	–	8	.429	9	–	21	.300
Morgan State	6	–	8	.429	13	–	17	.433
Delaware State	1	–	13	.071	5	–	24	.172
South Carolina State	1	–	13	.071	2	–	29	.065
† 2025 MEAC tournament winner

The 2024–25 Morgan State Lady Bears basketball team represented Morgan State University during the 2024–25 NCAA Division I women's basketball season. The Lady Bears, who were led by ninth-year head coach Ed Davis Jr., played their home games at Hill Field House in Baltimore, Maryland as members of the Mid-Eastern Athletic Conference (MEAC).

The Lady Bears finished the season 13–17, 6–8 in MEAC play, to finish in a tie for fifth place. They were defeated by Maryland Eastern Shore in the quarterfinals of the MEAC tournament.

== Previous season ==
The Lady Bears finished the 2023–24 season 8–20, 3–10 in MEAC play, to finish in seventh place. They were defeated by Howard in the quarterfinals of the MEAC tournament.

== Preseason ==
On October 8, 2024, the MEAC released their preseason coaches poll. Morgan State was picked to finish fifth in the MEAC.

=== Preseason rankings ===
MEAC preseason poll
Predicted finish	Team	Votes (1st place)
T–1	Norfolk State	117 (11)
T–1	Howard	117 (5)
3	Coppin State	79
4	North Carolina Central	78
5	Morgan State	63
6	Maryland Eastern Shore	57
7	Delaware State	43
8	South Carolina State	22

=== Preseason All-MEAC Teams ===
Preseason All-MEAC Teams
Team	Player	Position	Year
Third	Laila Fair	Forward	Senior

== Roster ==
2024–25 Morgan State Lady Bears women's basketball team
Players
Coaches

Pos.	#	Name	Height	Year	Previous school	Hometown
G	0	Tamaria Rumph	5 ft 4 in (1.63 m)	So	McClatchy High School	Sacramento, CA
G	1	Dakota Alston	5 ft 8 in (1.73 m)	So	Detroit Edison Public School Academy	Detroit, MI
G	2	Gabrielle Johnson	5 ft 8 in (1.73 m)	Jr	Western High School	Baltimore, MD
F	3	Success Prysock	6 ft 0 in (1.83 m)	Jr	Moorpark College	Palmdale, CA
G	4	Ja'la Bannerman	5 ft 7 in (1.7 m)	Jr	Maryland Eastern Shore	Baltimore, MD
G	5	Nia Green	6 ft 0 in (1.83 m)	Fr	Hammond High School	Columbia, MD
G	10	Emily Jones	5 ft 9 in (1.75 m)	Sr	Sacred Heart Cathedral Preparatory	San Francisco, CA
G	11	Kimora Daly	5 ft 9 in (1.75 m)	Jr	Odessa College	Oceanside, NY
G	12	Nakilah Johnson	5 ft 11 in (1.8 m)	Sr	Weber State	Oakland, CA
F	13	Naya Ojukwu	6 ft 1 in (1.85 m)	RS Fr	Gonzaga	Meridian, ID
F	14	Laila Fair	6 ft 2 in (1.88 m)	Sr	UMass	Middlesex, NJ
G	20	Michaela Bogans	5 ft 6 in (1.68 m)	Fr	Cross Creek High School	Augusta, GA
C	22	Jael Butler	6 ft 2 in (1.88 m)	Jr	Valley Christian High School	Gilroy, CA
F	23	Maya Woodson	6 ft 2 in (1.88 m)	So	South Plains College	Columbia, MD

Head coach

- Ed Davis Jr. (West Virginia State)

Assistant coach(es)

- Donchez Graham (Morgan State)
- Tykyrah Williams (Morgan State)
- Janelle Silver-Martin (Morgan State)

Legend

- (C) Team captain
- (S) Suspended
- (I) Ineligible
- (W) Walk-on
- Injured
- Current redshirt

Roster
Last update: June 1, 2025

== Schedule and results ==
Date time, TV	Rank^{#}	Opponent^{#}	Result	Record	Site (attendance) city, state
Non-conference regular season
November 4, 2024*; 5:00 p.m.		Shepherd	W 77–64	1–0	Hill Field House (136); Baltimore, MD
November 7, 2024*; 5:30 p.m.		Johns Hopkins	W 60–45	2–0	Hill Field House (102); Baltimore, MD
November 9, 2024*; 1:00 p.m., ESPN+		at Richmond	L 39–93	2–1	Robins Center (971); Richmond, VA
November 11, 2024*; 6:30 p.m., ESPN+		at Old Dominion	L 48–60	2–2	Chartway Arena (1,641); Norfolk, VA
November 14, 2024*; 5:30 p.m.		Towson; Charm City Hoops Classic	W 64–63	3–2	Hill Field House (1,957); Baltimore, MD
November 17, 2024*; 2:00 p.m., ESPN+		at UMBC; Charm City Hoops Classic	L 72–81	3–3	Chesapeake Employers Insurance Arena (687); Catonsville, MD
November 20, 2024*; 11:00 a.m.		Washington Adventist	W 85–45	4–3	Hill Field House (1,789); Baltimore, MD
November 22, 2024*; 10:00 p.m., ACCNX		at Stanford	L 49–91	4–4	Maples Pavilion (2,540); Stanford, CA
November 24, 2024*; 4:00 p.m., MWN		at Nevada	L 56–66	4–5	Lawlor Events Center (1,308); Reno, NV
November 27, 2024*; 12:00 p.m., ESPN+		at George Washington	L 47–52	4–6	Charles E. Smith Center (316); Washington, D.C.
December 5, 2024*; 7:00 p.m., ESPN+		at Sacred Heart	L 57–79	4–7	William H. Pitt Center (582); Fairfield, CT
December 7, 2024*; 1:00 p.m., NEC Front Row		at Central Connecticut	W 53–48	5–7	William H. Detrick Gymnasium (212); New Britain, CT
December 18, 2024*; 10:30 a.m.		vs. Presbyterian; Puerto Rico Clasico	W 54–41	6–7	Coliseo Rubén Rodríguez (100); Bayamón, Puerto Rico
December 19, 2024*; 1:00 p.m.		vs. Cleveland State; Puerto Rico Clasico	L 39–56	6–8	Coliseo Rubén Rodríguez (100); Bayamón, Puerto Rico
December 30, 2024*; 2:00 p.m., ESPN+		Mount St. Mary's	W 72–68	7–8	Hill Field House (89); Baltimore, MD
MEAC regular season
January 4, 2025; 2:00 p.m., ESPN+		South Carolina State	W 55–54	8–8 (1–0)	Hill Field House (67); Baltimore, MD
January 7, 2025; 2:00 p.m., ESPN+		North Carolina Central	W 84–79	9–8 (2–0)	Hill Field House (63); Baltimore, MD
January 11, 2025; 2:00 p.m., ESPN+		at Howard	L 56–75	9–9 (2–1)	Burr Gymnasium (699); Washington, D.C.
January 13, 2025; 5:30 p.m., ESPN+		Norfolk State	L 69–77	9–10 (2–2)	Hill Field House (102); Baltimore, MD
January 25, 2025; 2:00 p.m., ESPN+		Coppin State	L 56–61	9–11 (2–3)	Hill Field House (389); Baltimore, MD
February 1, 2025; 2:00 p.m., ESPN+		Maryland Eastern Shore	L 59–77	9–12 (2–4)	Hill Field House (450); Baltimore, MD
February 3, 2025; 5:30 p.m., ESPN+		at Delaware State	W 64–49	10–12 (3–4)	Memorial Hall (276); Dover, DE
February 15, 2025; 2:00 p.m.		at South Carolina State	W 60–55	11–12 (4–4)	SHM Memorial Center (568); Orangeburg, SC
February 17, 2025; 5:30 p.m., ESPN+		at North Carolina Central	L 53–71	11–13 (4–5)	McDougald–McLendon Arena (521); Durham, NC
February 22, 2025; 2:00 p.m., ESPN+		Howard	L 53–62	11–14 (4–6)	Hill Field House (345); Baltimore, MD
February 24, 2025; 5:30 p.m., ESPN+		at Norfolk State	L 46–90	11–15 (4–7)	Echols Hall (2,896); Norfolk, VA
March 1, 2025; 2:00 p.m.		at Maryland Eastern Shore	L 59–70	11–16 (4–8)	Hytche Athletic Center (400); Princess Anne, MD
March 3, 2025; 5:30 p.m., ESPN+		Delaware State	W 68–47	12–16 (5–8)	Hill Field House (2,123); Baltimore, MD
March 6, 2025; 5:30 p.m., ESPN+		at Coppin State	W 59–54	13–16 (6–8)	Physical Education Complex (619); Baltimore, MD
MEAC tournament
March 13, 2025; 2:00 p.m., ESPN+	(6)	vs. (3) Maryland Eastern Shore; Quarterfinals	L 67–74	13–17	Norfolk Scope; Norfolk, VA
*Non-conference game. ^{#}Rankings from AP poll. (#) Tournament seedings in parentheses. All times are in Eastern.
