= 2024–25 North Carolina Tar Heels women's basketball team =

Intercollegiate basketball season

2024–25 North Carolina Tar Heels women's basketball

Battle 4 Atlantis champions

NCAA tournament, Sweet Sixteen
- Conference: Atlantic Coast Conference

Ranking
- Coaches: No. 12
- AP: No. 14
- Record: 29–8 (13–5 ACC)
- Head coach: Courtney Banghart (6th season)
- Assistant coaches: Joanne Aluka-White (6th season); Adrian Walters (5th season); Cory McNeill (1st season); Daniel Metzelfeld (2nd season)
- Home arena: Carmichael Arena

2024–25 ACC women's basketball standings
	Conf.				Overall
Team	W		L	PCT	W		L	PCT
No. 9 NC State	16	–	2	.889	28	–	7	.800
No. 8 Notre Dame	16	–	2	.889	28	–	6	.824
No. 7 Duke †	14	–	4	.778	29	–	8	.784
No. 22 Florida State	13	–	5	.722	24	–	9	.727
No. 12 North Carolina	13	–	5	.722	29	–	8	.784
Louisville	13	–	5	.722	22	–	11	.667
California	12	–	6	.667	25	–	9	.735
Virginia Tech	9	–	9	.500	19	–	13	.594
Georgia Tech	9	–	9	.500	22	–	11	.667
Virginia	8	–	10	.444	17	–	15	.531
Stanford	8	–	10	.444	16	–	15	.516
Boston College	6	–	12	.333	16	–	18	.471
Syracuse	6	–	12	.333	12	–	18	.400
Clemson	6	–	12	.333	14	–	17	.452
Pittsburgh	5	–	13	.278	13	–	19	.406
Miami (FL)	4	–	14	.222	14	–	15	.483
Wake Forest	2	–	16	.111	9	–	20	.310
SMU	2	–	16	.111	10	–	20	.333
† 2025 ACC tournament winner Rankings from AP Poll

The 2024–25 North Carolina Tar Heels women's basketball team represented the University of North Carolina at Chapel Hill in the 2024–25 NCAA Division I women's basketball season. The Tar Heels were led by sixth-year head coach Courtney Banghart. The Tar Heels played their home games at Carmichael Arena in Chapel Hill, North Carolina as members of the Atlantic Coast Conference (ACC).

The Tar Heels started the season ranked fifteenth in the AP poll and won their first three games. Their first loss was a game against second ranked Connecticut 69–58. This saw the Tar Heels fall from fourteenth to sixteenth in the polls before traveling to the Bahamas to participate in the Battle 4 Atlantis. The Tar Heels won all three of their games in the tournament to finish as champions. They won the championship game 69–39 over Indiana. They also defeated fourteenth ranked Kentucky 72–53 in the ACC–SEC Challenge. The team recorded two more wins before their ACC opener against twenty-fifth ranked Georgia Tech. Georgia Tech won the game 82–76 and the Tar Heels fell to nineteenth in the rankings. The Tar Heels rebounded by defeating Florida 77–57 at a neutral site in the Jumpman Invitational. They won two games before falling 76–66 to third ranked Notre Dame. The Tar Heels then went on a five-game ACC winning streak, which included an overtime victory over fourteenth ranked and rival Duke. The team was ranked thirteenth when the streak was broken with a 86–84 loss to Florida State. The Tar Heels then went on a seven-game winning streak. Highlights of the streak were an away victory over nineteenth ranked California, two point road victories over Stanford and Clemson, and a one point victory over rival and tenth-ranked NC State. The Tar Heels finished the regular season by losing their final two games, a rivalry rematch against sixteenth ranked Duke and a three-point home loss to Virginia. The Tar Heels reached their season high in the rankings before those to losses, which was eighth.

The Tar Heels finished the regular season 25–6 overall and 13–5 in ACC play to finish in a three-way tie for fourth place. As the fifth seed in the ACC tournament, earned a bye into the second round, where they defeated Boston College 78–71. They avenged a regular season loss to Florida State, who was ranked twenty second at the time of this meeting, in the Quarterfinals 60–56. They lost in the semifinals to first seed and seventh-ranked rival NC State 66–55 to end their tournament run. They received an at-large invitation to the NCAA tournament and were the three-seed in the Birmingham 2 region. They defeated fourteen seed Oregon State in the first round and six-seed and sixteenth-ranked West Virginia in the second round. The Tar Heels hosted both games, before traveling to a neutral site to face second seed, seventh-ranked, rival Duke for a third time this season. After splitting the regular season series, Duke won the post-season matchup 47–38 to end the Tar Heels' season. They finished with an overall record of 29–8. Their 29 wins was the highest since the 2012–13 season.

== Previous season ==
The Tar Heels finished the 2023–24 season 20–13 overall and 11–7 in ACC play to finish in a tie for seventh place. As the eighth seed in the ACC tournament, they lost to ninth seed Miami in the second round. They received an at-large invitation to the NCAA tournament, marking the fourth straight time the Tar Heels qualified for the tournament. As the eighth seed in the Albany 1 region, they defeated ninth seed Michigan State in the first round before losing at first seed South Carolina in the second round to end their season.

== Offseason ==
=== Departures ===
Departures
Name	Number	Pos.	Height	Year	Hometown	Reason for departure
Alexandra Zelaya	0	F	6' 4"	Senior	Goodyear, AZ	Transferred to UNC Wilmington
Paulina Paris	2	G	5' 9"	Sophomore	Congers, NY	Transferred to Arizona
Teonni Key	13	G/F	6' 4"	(redshirt) Sophomore	Cary, NC	Transferred to Kentucky
RyLee Grays	22	F	6' 3"	Freshman	Pearland, TX	Transferred to Virginia
Deja Kelly	25	G	5' 8"	Senior	San Antonio, TX	Transferred to Oregon
Anya Poole	31	F	6' 2"	Senior	Raleigh, NC	Transferred to Clemson

=== Additions ===
==== Incoming transfers ====
Incoming transfers
Name	Number	Pos.	Height	Year	Hometown	Previous school
Grace Townsend	2	G	5' 5"	Graduate student	Midlothian, VA	Richmond
Trayanna Crisp	14	G	5' 8"	Junior	Goodyear, AZ	Arizona State

==== Recruiting class ====
College recruiting
Name	Hometown	School	Height	Weight	Commit date
Lanie Grant; PG	Midlothian, VA	James River	5 ft 9 in (1.75 m)	N/A	Mar 31, 2024
Lanie Grant; PG	Recruit ratings: ESPN: (94)				
Blanca Thomas; P	Charlotte, NC	Charlotte Catholic	6 ft 5 in (1.96 m)	N/A	May 20, 2023
Blanca Thomas; P	Recruit ratings: ESPN: (95)				
Jordan Zubich; G	Mountain Iron, MN	Mountain Iron-Buhl	5 ft 11 in (1.80 m)	N/A	Feb 12, 2023
Jordan Zubich; G	Recruit ratings: ESPN: (93)				
Overall recruit ranking:
Note: In many cases, Scout, Rivals, 247Sports, On3, and ESPN may conflict in their listings of height and weight.; In these cases, the average was taken. ESPN grades are on a 100-point scale.; Sources:

== Roster ==
2024–25 North Carolina Tar Heels women's basketball team
Players
Coaches

Pos.	#	Name	Height	Year	Previous school	Hometown
G	0	Lanie Grant	5 ft 9 in (1.75 m)	Fr	James River	Midlothian, VA
G/F	1	Alyssa Ustby	6 ft 1 in (1.85 m)	GS	Lourdes	Rochester, MN
G	2	Grace Townsend	5 ft 5 in (1.65 m)	GS	James River; Richmond	Midlothian, VA
G	3	Jordan Zubich	5 ft 11 in (1.8 m)	Fr	Mountain Iron-Buhl	Mountain Iron, MN
F	4	Laila Hull	6 ft 1 in (1.85 m)	RS Fr	Zionsville Community	Zionsville, IN
F/C	5	Maria Gakdeng	6 ft 3 in (1.91 m)	Sr	Boston College	Lanham, MD
G	10	Reniya Kelly	5 ft 7 in (1.7 m)	So	Hoover	Hoover, AL
G	11	Kayla McPherson	5 ft 8 in (1.73 m)	RS Jr	Madison County	Hull, GA
G	14	Trayanna Crisp	5 ft 8 in (1.73 m)	Jr	Millennium; Arizona State	Goodyear, AZ
G	15	Sydney Barker	5 ft 7 in (1.7 m)	So	Jordan	Durham, NC
G	20	Lexi Donarski	6 ft 0 in (1.83 m)	GS	Iowa State	La Crosse, WI
F	21	Ciera Toomey	6 ft 4 in (1.93 m)	RS Fr	Dunmore	Dunmore, PA
G	24	Indya Nivar	5 ft 10 in (1.78 m)	Jr	Stanford	Apex, NC
C	34	Blanca Thomas	6 ft 5 in (1.96 m)	Fr	Charlotte Catholic	Charlotte, NC

Head coach

- Courtney Banghart (Dartmouth)

Assistant coach(es)

- Joanne Aluka-White (Middle Tennessee)
- Adrian Walters (Saint Francis (PA))
- Cory McNeill (Morgan State)
- Daniel Metzelfeld (Trinity)

Legend

- (C) Team captain
- (S) Suspended
- (I) Ineligible
- (W) Walk-on
- Injured
- Current redshirt

Roster
Last update: August 27, 2024

== Schedule and results ==
Date time, TV	Rank^{#}	Opponent^{#}	Result	Record	High points	High rebounds	High assists	Site (attendance) city, state
Regular season
November 4, 2024*; 11:00 a.m., ACCNX/ESPN+	No. 15	Charleston Southern	W 83–53	1–0	18 – Ustby	8 – Ustby	5 – Ustby	Carmichael Arena (2,445); Chapel Hill, NC
November 7, 2024*; 7:00 p.m., ACCNX/ESPN+	No. 15	UNC Wilmington	W 77–50	2–0	21 – Donarski	10 – Thomas	8 – Townsend	Carmichael Arena (2,445); Chapel Hill, NC
November 12, 2024*; 7:00 p.m., FloHoops	No. 14	at North Carolina A&T	W 66–47	3–0	14 – Hull	9 – Ustby	6 – Townsend	Corbett Sports Center (3,593); Greensboro, NC
November 15, 2024*; 6:00 p.m., ESPN2	No. 14	vs. No. 2 Connecticut	L 58–69	3–1	15 – Nivar	9 – Nivar	3 – Crisp	Greensboro Coliseum (10,467); Greensboro, NC
November 23, 2024*; 6:30 p.m., FloHoops	No. 16	vs. Ball State; Battle 4 Atlantis quarterfinals	W 63–52	4–1	15 – Grant	11 – Ustby	3 – tied	Imperial Arena (572); Paradise Island, Bahamas
November 24, 2024*; 4:00 p.m., FloHoops	No. 16	vs. Villanova; Battle 4 Atlantis semifinals	W 53–36	5–1	14 – tied	11 – Ustby	3 – Nivar	Imperial Arena (385); Paradise Island, Bahamas
November 25, 2024*; 12:00 p.m., ESPN2	No. 16	vs. Indiana; Battle 4 Atlantis championship	W 69–39	6–1	15 – tied	13 – Ustby	5 – Ustby	Imperial Arena (437); Paradise Island, Bahamas
November 29, 2024*; 2:00 p.m., ACCNX/ESPN+	No. 16	North Carolina Central	W 119–43	7–1	24 – Ustby	11 – Gakdeng	6 – Kelly	Carmichael Arena (2,499); Chapel Hill, NC
December 5, 2024*; 5:00 p.m., ESPN2	No. 16	No. 14 Kentucky; ACC–SEC Challenge	W 72–53	8–1	18 – Kelly	9 – Gakdeng	6 – Kelly	Carmichael Arena (2,816); Chapel Hill, NC
December 8, 2024*; 2:00 p.m., ACCNX/ESPN+	No. 16	Coppin State	W 72–46	9–1	10 – Gakdeng	6 – tied	3 – tied	Carmichael Arena (2,415); Chapel Hill, NC
December 11, 2024*; 7:00 p.m., ACCNX/ESPN+	No. 14	UNC Greensboro	W 80–56	10–1	15 – Ustby	8 – Ustby	4 – Ustby	Carmichael Arena (2,249); Chapel Hill, NC
December 15, 2024; 2:00 p.m., ACCN	No. 14	No. 25 Georgia Tech	L 76–82	10–2 (0–1)	21 – Gakdeng	8 – Ustby	10 – Ustby	Carmichael Arena (2,381); Chapel Hill, NC
December 18, 2024*; 6:30 p.m., ESPNU	No. 19	vs. Florida; Jumpman Invitational	W 77–57	11–2	14 – Gakdeng	8 – Gakdeng	3 – tied	Spectrum Center; Charlotte, NC
December 21, 2024*; 12:00 p.m., ACCNX/ESPN+	No. 19	Norfolk State	W 90–47	12–2	15 – Grant	11 – Ustby	5 – Townsend	Carmichael Arena (2,211); Chapel Hill, NC
December 29, 2024; 4:00 p.m., ACCN	No. 17	at Miami (FL)	W 69–60	13–2 (1–1)	21 – Gakdeng	13 – Ustby	5 – Nivar	Watsco Center (3,397); Coral Gables, FL
January 5, 2025; 1:00 p.m., ESPN	No. 17	No. 3 Notre Dame	L 66–76	13–3 (1–2)	16 – Gakdeng	11 – Ustby	4 – Donarski	Carmichael Arena (4,785); Chapel Hill, NC
January 9, 2025; 7:00 p.m., ACCN	No. 19	No. 14 Duke; Rivalry	W 53–46 ^{OT}	14–3 (2–2)	10 – Ustby	12 – Ustby	4 – Nivar	Carmichael Arena (4,296); Chapel Hill, NC
January 12, 2025; 2:00 p.m., ACCN	No. 19	Boston College	W 80–67	15–3 (3–2)	17 – Ustby	6 – Gakdeng	4 – Tied	Carmichael Arena (3,478); Chapel Hill, NC
January 16, 2025; 8:00 p.m., ACCNX/ESPN+	No. 14	at SMU	W 64–33	16–3 (4–2)	15 – Donarski	18 – Ustby	4 – Ustby	Moody Coliseum (1,195); Dallas, TX
January 19, 2025; 2:00 p.m., ACCN	No. 14	at Pittsburgh	W 75–58	17–3 (5–2)	15 – Donarski	14 – Gakdeng	5 – Nivar	Petersen Events Center (800); Pittsburgh, PA
January 23, 2025; 7:00 p.m., ACCNX/ESPN+	No. 13	Wake Forest	W 76–51	18–3 (6–2)	17 – Donarski	9 – Ustby	4 – Kelly	Carmichael Arena (2,463); Chapel Hill, NC
January 26, 2025; 12:00 p.m., ACCN	No. 13	Florida State	L 84–86	18–4 (6–3)	21 – Gakdeng	10 – Ustby	6 – Townsend	Carmichael Arena (4,313); Chapel Hill, NC
January 30, 2025; 10:00 p.m., ACCNX/ESPN+	No. 15	at No. 19 California	W 65–52	19–4 (7–3)	16 – Kelly	13 – Gakdeng	2 – Grant	Haas Pavilion (2,866); Berkeley, CA
February 2, 2025; 3:00 p.m., The CW	No. 15	at Stanford	W 69–67	20–4 (8–3)	16 – Ustby	9 – Thomas	4 – Townsend	Maples Pavilion (4,181); Stanford, CA
February 9, 2025; 2:00 p.m., ACCNX/ESPN+	No. 13	at Clemson	W 53–51	21–4 (9–3)	17 – Kelly	13 – Ustby	3 – Kelly	Littlejohn Coliseum (2,090); Clemson, SC
February 13, 2025; 7:00 p.m., ACCNX/ESPN+	No. 12	Virginia Tech	W 67–62	22–4 (10–3)	20 – Kelly	16 – Ustby	3 – Ustby	Carmichael Arena (2,502); Chapel Hill, NC
February 16, 2025; 2:00 p.m., ESPN	No. 12	No. 10 NC State; Rivalry	W 66–65	23–4 (11–3)	23 – Kelly	8 – Gakdeng	2 – Townsend	Carmichael Arena (6,319); Chapel Hill, NC
February 20, 2025; 6:00 p.m., ACCN	No. 9	at Syracuse	W 68–58	24–4 (12–3)	21 – Gakdeng	14 – Gakdeng	6 – Kelly	JMA Wireless Dome (3,271); Syracuse, NY
February 23, 2025; 2:00 p.m., ESPN	No. 9	at Louisville	W 79–75	25–4 (13–3)	19 – Tied	11 – Gakdeng	4 – Kelly	KFC Yum! Center (11,280); Louisville, KY
February 27, 2025; 7:00 p.m., ESPN	No. 8	at No. 16 Duke; Rivalry	L 53–68	25–5 (13–4)	17 – Grant	7 – Gakdeng	4 – Townsend	Cameron Indoor Stadium (7,010); Durham, NC
March 2, 2025; 2:00 p.m., The CW	No. 8	Virginia	L 75–78	25–6 (13–5)	25 – Gakdeng	9 – Tied	5 – Gakdeng	Carmichael Arena (4,414); Chapel Hill, NC
ACC tournament
March 6, 2025*; 11:00 a.m., ACCN	(5) No. 14	vs. (12) Boston College; Second Round	W 78–71	26–6	20 – Donarski	8 – Gakdeng	5 – Nivar	Greensboro Coliseum (11,203); Greensboro, NC
March 7, 2025*; 11:00 a.m., ESPN2	(5) No. 14	vs. (4) No. 22 Florida State; Quarterfinals	W 60–56	27–6	12 – Tied	18 – Ustby	5 – Ustby	Greensboro Coliseum (16,416); Greensboro, NC
March 8, 2025*; 12:00 p.m., ESPN2	(5) No. 14	vs. (1) No. 7 NC State; Semifinals	L 55–66	27–7	13 – Nivar	10 – Gakdeng	4 – Townsend	Greensboro Coliseum (10,894); Greensboro, NC
NCAA tournament
March 22, 2025*; 4:30 p.m., ESPNU	(3 B2) No. 12	(14 B2) Oregon State; First Round	W 70–49	28–7	19 – Donarski	9 – Ustby	4 – Tied	Carmichael Arena (5,363); Chapel Hill, NC
March 24, 2025*; 7:00 p.m., ESPN2	(3 B2) No. 12	(6 B2) No. 16 West Virginia; Second Round	W 58–47	29–7	21 – Ustby	10 – Nivar	2 – Tied	Carmichael Arena (4,271); Chapel Hill, NC
March 28, 2025*; 2:30 p.m., ESPN	(3 B2) No. 12	vs. (2 B2) No. 7 Duke; Sweet Sixteen/Rivalry	L 38–47	29–8	9 – Ustby	10 – Ustby	2 – Ustby	Legacy Arena (11,055); Birmingham, AL
*Non-conference game. ^{#}Rankings from AP poll. (#) Tournament seedings in parentheses. B2; Source=Birmingham 2. All times are in Eastern.

== Rankings ==
Ranking movements Legend: ██ Increase in ranking ██ Decrease in ranking
	Week																				
Poll	Pre	1	2	3	4	5	6	7	8	9	10	11	12	13	14	15	16	17	18	19	Final
AP	15	14	16	16	16	14	19	17	17	19	14	13	15	13	12	9	8	14	12	12	14
Coaches	16	15	15	14	15	14	18	17	17	18	14	13	15	13	12	10	9	14	14	14	12
