= 2024–25 Maryland Eastern Shore Hawks women's basketball team =

American college basketball season

2024–25 Maryland Eastern Shore Hawks women's basketball
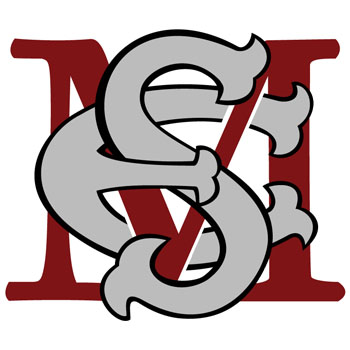
- Conference: Mid-Eastern Athletic Conference
- Record: 14–17 (8–6 MEAC)
- Head coach: Malikah Willis (1st season)
- Assistant coaches: Adria Crawford; Capree Garner
- Home arena: Hytche Athletic Center

2024–25 MEAC women's basketball standings
	Conf.				Overall
Team	W		L	PCT	W		L	PCT
Norfolk State †	14	–	0	1.000	30	–	5	.857
Howard	12	–	2	.857	22	–	12	.647
Maryland Eastern Shore	8	–	6	.571	14	–	17	.452
Coppin State	8	–	6	.571	19	–	15	.559
North Carolina Central	6	–	8	.429	9	–	21	.300
Morgan State	6	–	8	.429	13	–	17	.433
Delaware State	1	–	13	.071	5	–	24	.172
South Carolina State	1	–	13	.071	2	–	29	.065
† 2025 MEAC tournament winner

The 2024–25 Maryland Eastern Shore Hawks women's basketball team represented the University of Maryland Eastern Shore during the 2024–25 NCAA Division I women's basketball season. The Hawks, who were led by first-year head coach Malikah Willis, played their home games at the Hytche Athletic Center in Princess Anne, Maryland as members of the Mid-Eastern Athletic Conference (MEAC).

== Previous season ==
The Hawks finished the 2023–24 season 15–15, 8–6 in MEAC play, to finish in a tie for fourth place. They were defeated by Coppin State in the quarterfinals of the MEAC tournament.

On March 22, 2024, the school announced that they would be relieving head coach Fred Batchelor from his head coaching duties, ending his 18-year tenure with the team. On April 26, the school announced the hiring of Kennesaw State assistant coach Malikah Willis as Batchelor's successor.

== Preseason ==
On October 8, 2024, the MEAC released their preseason coaches poll. Maryland Eastern Shore was picked to finish sixth in the MEAC.

=== Preseason rankings ===
MEAC preseason poll
Predicted finish	Team	Votes (1st place)
T-1	Norfolk State	117 (11)
T-1	Howard	117 (5)
3	Coppin State	79
4	North Carolina Central	78
5	Morgan State	63
6	Maryland Eastern Shore	57
7	Delaware State	43
8	South Carolina State	22

=== Preseason All-MEAC Teams ===
Preseason All-MEAC Teams
Team	Player	Position	Year
Second	Mahogany Lester	Guard	Graduate student
Third	Zamara Haynes	Guard	Graduate student

== Roster ==
2024–25 Maryland Eastern Shore Hawks women's basketball team
Players
Coaches

Pos.	#	Name	Height	Year	Previous school	Hometown
G	0	Chaniqwa Gilliam	5 ft 8 in (1.73 m)	GS	William & Mary	Norfolk, Virginia
G	1	Aleah James	5 ft 7 in (1.7 m)	Jr	Union College	Brooklyn, New York
F/C	2	Mahogany Lester	6 ft 0 in (1.83 m)	GS	Princess Anne High School	Virginia Beach, Virginia
F	3	Amira Ofunniyin	6 ft 0 in (1.83 m)	So	Panther Creek High School	Cary, North Carolina
G	11	Zamara Haynes	5 ft 7 in (1.7 m)	GS	Imhotep Institute Charter High School	Philadelphia, Pennsylvania
F	12	Brianna Barnes	5 ft 11 in (1.8 m)	Jr	Lehman College	Bronx, New York
G	21	Jayla Butler	5 ft 5 in (1.65 m)	Jr	Bellarmine	Milwaukee, Wisconsin
G	22	Amiaya Morgan	5 ft 9 in (1.75 m)	Sr	Delaware State	Sicklerville, New Jersey
F	23	Ce'nara Skanes	6 ft 0 in (1.83 m)	Jr	Eastern Michigan	Oklahoma City, Oklahoma
F/C	24	Lesley Thomas	6 ft 0 in (1.83 m)	Sr	Winston Salem Christian School	Browns Summit, North Carolina
G	25	Ashanti Lynch	5 ft 9 in (1.75 m)	Jr	North Lenoir High School	Hookerton, North Carolina
G/F	30	Kiarra Kennedy	5 ft 11 in (1.8 m)	Sr	Middletown High School	Bronx, New York
F	31	Candela Sabater Sánchez	6 ft 0 in (1.83 m)	Fr	Santa María Del Carmen	Elda, Spain
F	33	Lainey Allen	6 ft 2 in (1.88 m)	Jr	Plymouth-Whitemarsh High School	Plymouth Meeting, Pennsylvania
F	35	Dakieran Turner	6 ft 1 in (1.85 m)	Jr	Saint Frances Academy	Annapolis, Maryland

Head coach

- Malikah Willis (Iowa)

Assistant coach(es)

- Adria Crawford (Georgetown)
- Capree Garner (Hartford)

Legend

- (C) Team captain
- (S) Suspended
- (I) Ineligible
- (W) Walk-on
- Injured
- Current redshirt

Roster
Last update: May 27, 2025

== Schedule and results ==
Date time, TV	Rank^{#}	Opponent^{#}	Result	Record	Site (attendance) city, state
Non-conference regular season
November 6, 2024*; 6:00 pm, ESPN+		at VCU	L 60–75	0–1	Siegel Center (562); Richmond, VA
November 9, 2024*; 2:00 pm		Bowie State	W 65–57	1–1	Hytche Athletic Center (900); Princess Anne, MD
November 13, 2024*; 7:00 pm		Buffalo	L 46–56	1–2	Hytche Athletic Center (129); Princess Anne, MD
November 16, 2024*; 2:00 pm		Virginia–Lynchburg	W 75–32	2–2	Hytche Athletic Center (371); Princess Anne, MD
November 21, 2024*; 7:00 pm		Cheyney	W 67–42	3–2	Hytche Athletic Center (179); Princess Anne, MD
November 25, 2024*; 11:00 am, BallerTV		vs. Dayton; Music City Classic	W 62–56	4–2	Trojan Fieldhouse (126); Nashville, TN
November 26, 2024*; 1:15 pm, BallerTV		vs. No. 19 Illinois; Music City Classic	L 55–75	4–3	Trojan Fieldhouse (341); Nashville, TN
November 29, 2024*; 4:30 pm, B1G+		vs. Georgia Southern; Battle on the Banks	L 47–58	4–4	Jersey Mike's Arena (1,651); Piscataway, NJ
November 30, 2024*; 4:30 pm, B1G+		vs. Marquette; Battle on the Banks	L 48–74	4–5	Jersey Mike's Arena (1,703); Piscataway, NJ
December 7, 2024*; 1:45 pm, RyzSN		vs. Arizona State; Coaches vs. Racism Roundball Classic	L 57–64	4–6	CareFirst Arena; Washington, D.C.
December 14, 2024*; 3:00 pm, ESPN+		at George Mason	L 40–61	4–7	EagleBank Arena (1,057); Fairfax, VA
December 17, 2024*; 7:00 pm, ACCNX		at Virginia	L 64–80	4–8	John Paul Jones Arena (3,681); Charlottesville, VA
December 20, 2024*; 12:00 pm		Mississippi State	L 52–70	4–9	Hytche Athletic Center (400); Princess Anne, MD
December 28, 2024*; 7:00 pm, FloHoops		at Georgetown	L 68–78	4–10	McDonough Arena; Washington, D.C.
January 2, 2025*; 7:00 pm		Lincoln (PA)	W 55–39	5–10	Hytche Athletic Center (328); Princess Anne, MD
MEAC regular season
January 4, 2025; 2:00 pm, ESPN+		at Norfolk State	L 54–72	5–11 (0–1)	Echols Hall (1,347); Norfolk, VA
January 11, 2025; 2:00 pm, ESPN+		at North Carolina Central	L 86–92 ^{2OT}	5–12 (0–2)	McDougald–McLendon Arena (1,243); Durham, NC
January 13, 2025; 5:30 pm		at South Carolina State	W 63–55	6–12 (1–2)	SHM Memorial Center (252); Orangeburg, SC
January 25, 2025; 2:00 pm		Delaware State	W 66–46	7–12 (2–2)	Hytche Athletic Center (378); Princess Anne, MD
February 1, 2025; 2:00 pm, ESPN+		at Morgan State	W 77–59	8–12 (3–2)	Hill Field House (450); Baltimore, MD
February 3, 2025; 5:30 pm		Coppin State	L 61–66	8–13 (3–3)	Hytche Athletic Center (361); Princess Anne, MD
February 10, 2025; 5:30 pm		Howard	L 56–66	8–14 (3–4)	Hytche Athletic Center (538); Princess Anne, MD
February 15, 2025; 2:00 pm		Norfolk State	L 48–70	8–15 (3–5)	Hytche Athletic Center (329); Princess Anne, MD
February 17, 2025; 5:30 pm, ESPN+		at Howard	L 59–72	8–16 (3–6)	Burr Gymnasium (1,000); Washington, D.C.
February 24, 2025; 5:30 pm		South Carolina State	W 70–29	9–16 (4–6)	Hytche Athletic Center (350); Princess Anne, MD
February 26, 2025; 5:30 pm		North Carolina Central	W 67–57	10–16 (5–6)	Hytche Athletic Center (389); Princess Anne, MD
March 1, 2025; 2:00 pm		Morgan State	W 70–59	11–16 (6–6)	Hytche Athletic Center (400); Princess Anne, MD
March 3, 2025; 5:30 pm, ESPN+		at Coppin State	W 62–56	12–16 (7–6)	Physical Education Complex (307); Baltimore, MD
March 6, 2025; 5:30 pm, ESPN+		at Delaware State	W 69–35	13–16 (8–6)	Memorial Hall (109); Dover, DE
MEAC tournament
March 13, 2025; 2:00 pm, ESPN+	(3)	vs. (6) Morgan State; Quarterfinals	W 74–67	14–16	Norfolk Scope; Norfolk, VA
March 14, 2025; 2:00 pm, ESPN+	(3)	vs. (2) Howard; Semifinals	L 59–67	14–17	Norfolk Scope; Norfolk, VA
*Non-conference game. ^{#}Rankings from AP Poll. (#) Tournament seedings in parentheses. All times are in Eastern.
