= 2024–25 New Hampshire Wildcats women's basketball team =

American college basketball season

2024–25 New Hampshire Wildcats women's basketball
- Conference: America East Conference
- Record: 10–20 (4–12 America East)
- Head coach: Megan Shoniker (1st season)
- Assistant coaches: Joe Rutigliano; Kennedi Thompson; Jessica George; Alexa Brodie
- Home arena: Lundholm Gym

2024–25 America East Conference women's basketball standings
	Conf.				Overall
Team	W		L	PCT	W		L	PCT
Albany	14	–	2	.875	26	–	7	.788
Vermont †	13	–	3	.813	21	–	13	.618
Bryant	9	–	7	.563	17	–	15	.531
Maine	9	–	7	.563	15	–	16	.484
NJIT	8	–	8	.500	11	–	19	.367
Binghamton	7	–	9	.438	15	–	15	.500
UMBC	7	–	9	.438	14	–	15	.483
New Hampshire	4	–	12	.250	10	–	20	.333
UMass Lowell	1	–	15	.063	3	–	25	.107
† 2025 AmEast tournament winner

The 2024–25 New Hampshire Wildcats women's basketball team represented the University of New Hampshire during the 2024–25 NCAA Division I women's basketball season. The Wildcats, led by first-year head coach Megan Shoniker, played their home games at the Lundholm Gym in Durham, New Hampshire, as members of the America East Conference.

== Previous season ==
The Wildcats finished the 2023–24 season 9–20, 3–13 in America East play, to finish in last place. Since only the top eight teams make it, the Wildcats failed to qualify for the America East tournament.

On March, 28, 2024, head coach Kelsey Hogan announced her resignation, ending her four-year tenure with the team. On April 24, the school announced that they would be hiring Rhode Island associate head coach Megan Shoniker as the team's next head coach.

== Roster ==
2024–25 New Hampshire Wildcats women's basketball team
Players
Coaches

Pos.	#	Name	Height	Year	Previous school	Hometown
G	0	Maggie Cavanaugh	5 ft 9 in (1.75 m)	So	St. Rose High School	Point Pleasant Beach, NJ
G	2	McKenna Karlson	5 ft 9 in (1.75 m)	Fr	Manasquan High School	Manasquan, NJ
G	10	Diana Eliasson	5 ft 7 in (1.7 m)	Jr	Luleå gymnasieskola	Stockholm, Sweden
G	11	Avery O'Connor	6 ft 0 in (1.83 m)	Jr	Dedham High School	Dedham, MA
G	12	Aina Roque Sucarrats	5 ft 9 in (1.75 m)	Jr	Antoni Torroja Highschool	Cervera, Spain
F	13	Clara Gomez	6 ft 1 in (1.85 m)	Sr	Colorado State	Barcelona, Spain
F	14	Sharmela Reid	6 ft 1 in (1.85 m)	So	Dawson College	Montreal, QC
G	15	Carly Catania	5 ft 9 in (1.75 m)	Fr	Villa Maria Academy	West Chester, PA
G	20	Karolina Andersson	5 ft 11 in (1.8 m)	Jr	Haga Gymnasiet	Söderköping, Sweden
G	21	Eva DeChent	5 ft 11 in (1.8 m)	So	Rhode Island	Putnam Valley, NY
G	23	Elizabeth Lavoie	5 ft 11 in (1.8 m)	Fr	Pinkerton Academy	Derry, NH
G	24	Kenzie Matulonis	5 ft 7 in (1.7 m)	Sr	Bridgewater-Raynham High School	Raynham, MA
G	30	Sydney Lusher	5 ft 11 in (1.8 m)	GS	Le Moyne	Oneida, NY
F	32	Lucia Melero Sabat	6 ft 0 in (1.83 m)	Jr	Institut Pompeu Fabra	Barcelona, Spain
F	42	Belen Morales Lopez	6 ft 0 in (1.83 m)	Sr	Casper College	Alicante, Spain

Head coach

- Megan Shoniker (Rhode Island)

Assistant coach(es)

- Joe Rutigliano (Saint Francis (PA))
- Kennedi Thompson (Binghamton)
- Jessica George (UMass)
- Alexa Brodie (Colgate)

Legend

- (C) Team captain
- (S) Suspended
- (I) Ineligible
- (W) Walk-on
- Injured
- Current redshirt

Roster
Last update: December 13, 2024

== Schedule and results ==
Date time, TV	Rank^{#}	Opponent^{#}	Result	Record	Site (attendance) city, state
Non-conference regular season
November 4, 2024*; 6:00 p.m., ESPN+		Worcester State	W 83–34	1–0	Lundholm Gym (281); Durham, NH
November 7, 2024*; 6:00 p.m., ESPN+		at UMass	W 48–45	2–0	Mullins Center (1,033); Amherst, MA
November 11, 2024*; 3:00 p.m., ESPN+		at Merrimack	L 49–59	2–1	Hammel Court (524); North Andover, MA
November 14, 2024*; 7:00 p.m., FloHoops		at Northeastern	W 58–31	3–1	Cabot Center (398); Boston, MA
November 16, 2024*; 6:00 p.m., ESPN+		Boston University	W 69–60	4–1	Lundholm Gym (270); Durham, NH
November 20, 2024*; 6:00 p.m., ACCNX		at Boston College	L 45–80	4–2	Conte Forum (647); Chestnut Hill, MA
November 23, 2024*; 2:00 p.m., ESPN+		at Howard	L 55–76	4–3	Burr Gymnasium (357); Washington, D.C.
November 26, 2024*; 6:00 p.m., ESPN+		Holy Cross	L 43–57	4–4	Lundholm Gym (181); Durham, NH
December 1, 2024*; 2:00 p.m., ESPN+		at Dartmouth; Rivalry	W 64–57	5–4	Leede Arena (765); Hanover, NH
December 7, 2024*; 1:00 p.m., ESPN+		Army	L 59–60	5–5	Lundholm Gym (339); Durham, NH
December 19, 2024*; 2:30 p.m., ACCNX		at Pittsburgh	L 39–94	5–6	Petersen Events Center (157); Pittsburgh, PA
December 21, 2024*; 7:00 p.m., ESPN+		at Brown	L 43–70	5–7	Pizzitola Sports Center (300); Providence, RI
December 30, 2024*; 4:00 p.m., NEC Front Row		at Stonehill	W 74–57	6–7	Merkert Gymnasium (474); Easton, MA
America East regular season
January 2, 2025; 6:00 p.m., ESPN+		Bryant	L 49–61	6–8 (0–1)	Lundholm Gym (342); Durham, NH
January 4, 2025; 2:00 p.m., ESPN+		at Vermont	L 52–72	6–9 (0–2)	Patrick Gym (1,045); Burlington, VT
January 9, 2025; 6:30 p.m., ESPN+		at Albany	L 32–59	6–10 (0–3)	Broadview Center (921); Albany, NY
January 11, 2025; 2:00 p.m., ESPN+		at Binghamton	L 44–67	6–11 (0–4)	Dr. Bai Lee Court (1,126); Vestal, NY
January 16, 2025; 11:00 a.m., ESPN+		UMBC	W 56–39	7–11 (1–4)	Lundholm Gym (223); Durham, NH
January 18, 2025; 6:00 p.m., ESPN+		NJIT	W 70–48	8–11 (2–4)	Lundholm Gym (426); Durham, NH
January 23, 2025; 6:00 p.m., ESPN+		at Bryant	L 41–42	8–12 (2–5)	Chace Athletic Center (395); Smithfield, RI
January 25, 2025; 1:00 p.m., ESPN+		UMass Lowell	L 54–56	8–13 (2–6)	Lundholm Gym (485); Durham, NH
January 30, 2025; 6:00 p.m., ESPN+		Maine	L 54–65	8–14 (2–7)	Lundholm Gym (482); Durham, NH
February 6, 2025; 6:30 p.m., ESPN+		at UMBC	L 32–51	8–15 (2–8)	Chesapeake Employers Insurance Arena (321); Catonsville, MD
February 8, 2025; 6:00 p.m., ESPN+		at NJIT	L 63–71	8–16 (2–9)	Wellness and Events Center (267); Newark, NJ
February 13, 2025; 6:00 p.m., ESPN+		Vermont	L 46–55	8–17 (2–10)	Lundholm Gym (178); Durham, NH
February 15, 2025; 1:00 p.m., ESPN+		at UMass Lowell	W 62–55 ^{OT}	9–17 (3–10)	Costello Athletic Center (539); Lowell, MA
February 20, 2025; 6:00 p.m., ESPN+		Binghamton	W 65–38	10–17 (4–10)	Lundholm Gym (182); Durham, NH
February 22, 2025; 12:00 p.m., ESPN+		Albany	L 49–67	10–18 (4–11)	Lundholm Gym (691); Durham, NH
February 27, 2025; 6:00 p.m., ESPN+		at Maine	L 48–62	10–19 (4–12)	Memorial Gymnasium (1,275); Orono, ME
America East tournament
March 6, 2025; 6:30 pm, ESPN+	(8)	at (1) Albany; Quarterfinals	L 44–66	10–20	Broadview Center (1,016); Albany, NY
*Non-conference game. ^{#}Rankings from AP poll. (#) Tournament seedings in parentheses. All times are in Eastern.
