= 2024–25 NJIT Highlanders women's basketball team =

American college basketball season

2024–25 NJIT Highlanders women's basketball
- Conference: America East Conference
- Record: 11–18 (8–8 America East)
- Head coach: Mike Lane (7th season)
- Assistant coaches: Colleen Moriarty; Payce Lange; Camryn Johnson; Kelly Guarino
- Home arena: Wellness and Events Center

2024–25 America East Conference women's basketball standings
	Conf.				Overall
Team	W		L	PCT	W		L	PCT
Albany	14	–	2	.875	26	–	7	.788
Vermont †	13	–	3	.813	21	–	13	.618
Bryant	9	–	7	.563	17	–	15	.531
Maine	9	–	7	.563	15	–	16	.484
NJIT	8	–	8	.500	11	–	19	.367
Binghamton	7	–	9	.438	15	–	15	.500
UMBC	7	–	9	.438	14	–	15	.483
New Hampshire	4	–	12	.250	10	–	20	.333
UMass Lowell	1	–	15	.063	3	–	25	.107
† 2025 AmEast tournament winner

The 2024–25 NJIT Highlanders women's basketball team represented the New Jersey Institute of Technology during the 2024–25 NCAA Division I women's basketball season. The Highlanders, led by seventh-year head coach Mike Lane, played their home games at the Wellness and Events Center in Newark, New Jersey as members of the America East Conference.

== Previous season ==
The Highlanders finished the 2023–24 season 12–18, 4–12 in America East play, to finish in a tie for seventh place. They were defeated by Albany in the quarterfinals of the America East tournament.

== Roster ==
2024–25 NJIT Highlanders women's basketball team
Players
Coaches

Pos.	#	Name	Height	Year	Previous school	Hometown
G	2	Mayah Alford	5 ft 9 in (1.75 m)	Fr	Trenton Catholic Academy	Levittown, PA
G	3	Allison Cannon	5 ft 9 in (1.75 m)	Fr	Holmdel HS	Holmdel, NJ
F	5	Audrey Kormann	6 ft 2 in (1.88 m)	So	Maple Grove Senior HS	Maple Grove, MN
G	8	Enya Maguire	5 ft 5 in (1.65 m)	GS	Houston Christian	Belfast, Northern Ireland
G	10	Marissa Gingrich	5 ft 7 in (1.7 m)	So	Mifflin County HS	Lewistown, PA
G	11	Aria Myers	5 ft 9 in (1.75 m)	GS	Paramus Catholic HS	Cedar Grove, NJ
G	13	Piper Engelby	5 ft 11 in (1.8 m)	Fr	Andover HS	Andover, MN
G	15	Madilyn Dogs	6 ft 0 in (1.83 m)	So	Kewaskum HS	Kewaskum, WI
F	21	Trinity Williams	6 ft 1 in (1.85 m)	Sr	Palisades HS	Upper Black Eddy, PA
G	22	Reese Vaughan	5 ft 9 in (1.75 m)	Sr	Seton Catholic Central	Endwell, NY
F	23	Mackenzie Wright-Rawls	6 ft 0 in (1.83 m)	So	Central York HS	York, PA
F	24	Kyleigh Welsh	6 ft 2 in (1.88 m)	RS So	Clearwater HS	Clearwater, FL
G	25	Avery O'Roke	5 ft 7 in (1.7 m)	Jr	Millbrook HS	Winchester, VA
F	30	Olivia O'Meally	6 ft 1 in (1.85 m)	Fr	Niskayuna HS	Niskayuna, NY
G	32	Olivia Kulyk	6 ft 1 in (1.85 m)	Fr	Mercyhurst Prep	Edinboro, PA
G	34	Alejandra Zuniga	5 ft 6 in (1.68 m)	Jr	IES Jose Garcia Nieto	Madrid, Spain
F	55	Angelina Banas	6 ft 0 in (1.83 m)	So	Notre Dame HS	Columbus, NJ

Head coach

- Mike Lane (Notre Dame)

Assistant coach(es)

- Colleen Moriarty (UMass Dartmouth)
- Payce Lange (Kean)
- Camryn Johnson (Francis Marion)
- Kelly Guarino (NJIT)

Legend

- (C) Team captain
- (S) Suspended
- (I) Ineligible
- (W) Walk-on
- Injured
- Current redshirt

Roster
Last update: December 17, 2024

== Schedule and results ==
Date time, TV	Rank^{#}	Opponent^{#}	Result	Record	Site (attendance) city, state
Non-conference regular season
November 4, 2024*; 7:00 p.m., NEC Front Row		at Saint Francis	W 80–60	1–0	DeGol Arena (514); Loretto, PA
November 8, 2024*; 6:00 p.m., ESPN+		Hofstra	L 69–74	1–1	Wellness and Events Center (325); Newark, NJ
November 10, 2024*; 2:00 p.m., B1G+		at Rutgers	L 84–94	1–2	Jersey Mike's Arena (1,548); Piscataway, NJ
November 13, 2024*; 6:00 p.m., ESPN+		Sacred Heart	W 73–52	2–2	Wellness and Events Center (385); Newark, NJ
November 17, 2024*; 1:00 p.m., ESPN+		at Florida Gulf Coast	L 53–73	2–3	Alico Arena (1,732); Fort Myers, FL
November 20, 2024*; 6:00 p.m., ESPN+		Army	L 68–69 ^{OT}	2–4	Wellness and Events Center (345); Newark, NJ
November 23, 2024*; 2:00 p.m., ESPN+		at Merrimack	L 76–87	2–5	Hammel Court (449); North Andover, MA
November 26, 2024*; 7:00 p.m., ESPN+		Lafayette	L 69–71	2–6	Wellness and Events Center (375); Newark, NJ
December 1, 2024*; 2:00 p.m., ESPN+		at Saint Peter's	L 60–65	2–7	Run Baby Run Arena (225); Jersey City, NJ
December 3, 2024*; 6:00 p.m., ESPN+		Coppin State	L 61–63	2–8	Wellness and Events Center (245); Newark, NJ
December 9, 2024*; 7:00 p.m., ESPN+		Monmouth	L 54–63	2–9	Wellness and Events Center (234); Newark, NJ
December 12, 2024*; 7:00 p.m., NEC Front Row		at Wagner	L 60–62	2–10	Spiro Sports Center (215); Staten Island, NY
December 30, 2024*; 7:00 p.m., NEC Front Row		at LIU	W 89–60	3–10	Steinberg Wellness Center (89); Brooklyn, NY
America East regular season
January 2, 2025; 6:00 p.m., ESPN+		Binghamton	W 58–49	4–10 (1–0)	Wellness and Events Center (277); Newark, NJ
January 9, 2025; 7:00 p.m., ESPN+		at UMBC	W 83–55	5–10 (2–0)	Chesapeake Employers Insurance Arena (317); Catonsville, MD
January 11, 2025; 1:00 p.m., ESPN+		UMass Lowell	W 72–54	6–10 (3–0)	Wellness and Events Center (221); Newark, NJ
January 16, 2025; 6:00 p.m., ESPN+		at Maine	L 58–71	6–11 (3–1)	Memorial Gymnasium (880); Orono, ME
January 18, 2025; 6:00 p.m., ESPN+		at New Hampshire	L 48–70	6–12 (3–2)	Lundholm Gym (426); Durham, NH
January 23, 2025; 6:00 p.m., ESPN+		Vermont	L 38–60	6–13 (3–3)	Wellness and Events Center (181); Newark, NJ
January 25, 2025; 1:00 p.m., ESPN+		Albany	L 59–75	6–14 (3–4)	Wellness and Events Center (323); Newark, NJ
January 30, 2025; 11:00 am, ESPN+		at UMass Lowell	W 52–38	7–14 (4–4)	Tsongas Center (3,204); Lowell, MA
February 1, 2025; 2:00 p.m., ESPN+		at Bryant	L 66–71	7–15 (4–5)	Chace Athletic Center (430); Smithfield, RI
February 6, 2025; 6:00 p.m., ESPN+		Maine	W 61–56	8–15 (5–5)	Wellness and Events Center (177); Newark, NJ
February 8, 2025; 6:00 p.m., ESPN+		New Hampshire	W 71–63	9–15 (6–5)	Wellness and Events Center (67); Newark, NJ
February 13, 2025; 6:00 p.m., ESPN+		Bryant	W 64–53	10–15 (7–5)	Wellness and Events Center (232); Newark, NJ
February 15, 2025; 2:00 p.m., ESPN+		at Binghamton	L 55–65	10–16 (7–6)	Dr. Bai Lee Court (1,527); Vestal, NY
February 22, 2025; 1:00 p.m., ESPN+		UMBC	W 83–65	11–16 (8–6)	Wellness and Events Center (223); Newark, NJ
February 27, 2025; 6:00 p.m., ESPN+		at Vermont	L 43–75	11–17 (8–7)	Patrick Gym (740); Burlington, VT
March 1, 2025; 7:00 p.m., ESPN+		at Albany	L 52–73	11–18 (8–8)	Broadview Center (1,515); Albany, NY
America East tournament
March 6, 2025; 6:00 pm, ESPN+	(5)	at (4) Maine; Quarterfinals	L 51–65	11–19	Memorial Gymnasium (837); Orono, ME
*Non-conference game. ^{#}Rankings from AP poll. (#) Tournament seedings in parentheses. All times are in Eastern.
