= 2024–25 UMass Lowell River Hawks women's basketball team =

American college basketball season

2024–25 UMass Lowell River Hawks women's basketball
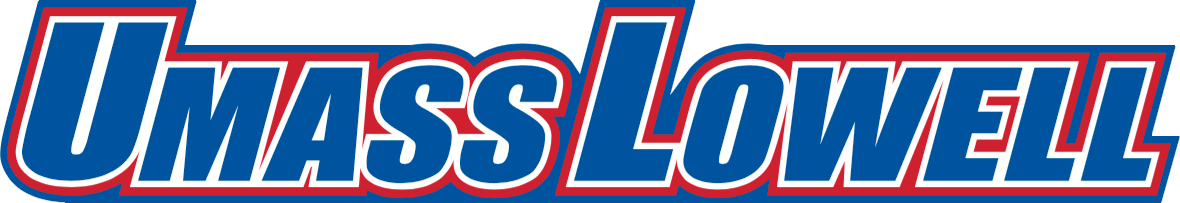
- Conference: America East Conference
- Record: 3–25 (1–15 America East)
- Head coach: Denise King (5th season)
- Assistant coaches: Stefanie Murphy-Thorpe; A.G. Hall; Evelyn Thompson
- Home arena: Costello Athletic Center

2024–25 America East Conference women's basketball standings
	Conf.				Overall
Team	W		L	PCT	W		L	PCT
Albany	14	–	2	.875	26	–	7	.788
Vermont †	13	–	3	.813	21	–	13	.618
Bryant	9	–	7	.563	17	–	15	.531
Maine	9	–	7	.563	15	–	16	.484
NJIT	8	–	8	.500	11	–	19	.367
Binghamton	7	–	9	.438	15	–	15	.500
UMBC	7	–	9	.438	14	–	15	.483
New Hampshire	4	–	12	.250	10	–	20	.333
UMass Lowell	1	–	15	.063	3	–	25	.107
† 2025 AmEast tournament winner

The 2024–25 UMass Lowell River Hawks women's basketball team represented the University of Massachusetts Lowell during the 2024–25 NCAA Division I women's basketball season. The River Hawks, who were led by fifth-year head coach Denise King, played their home games at the Costello Athletic Center, with one game being played at the Tsongas Center, both located in Lowell, Massachusetts, as members of the America East Conference.

The River Hawks finished the season 3–25, 1–15 in America East play, to finish in ninth (last) place.

== Previous season ==
The River Hawks finished the 2023–24 season 4–25, 4–12 in America East play, to finish in a tie for seventh place. They were defeated by top-seeded and eventual tournament champions Maine in the quarterfinals of the America East tournament.

== Roster ==
2024–25 UMass Lowell River Hawks women's basketball team
Players
Coaches

Pos.	#	Name	Height	Year	Previous school	Hometown
G	0	Jennah Johnson	5 ft 8 in (1.73 m)	Fr	Woodbridge High School	Woodbridge, NJ
G	1	Amina Kameric	5 ft 9 in (1.75 m)	Sr	Saskatchewan	Seattle, WA
G	2	Sille-Liis Mölder	5 ft 10 in (1.78 m)	Fr	Audentes Sports Gymnasium	Tallinn, Estonia
G	4	Emina Kameric	5 ft 11 in (1.8 m)	Fr	John F. Kennedy School, Berlin	Seattle, WA
G	5	Abbey Lindsey	5 ft 8 in (1.73 m)	So	Staten Island Academy	Staten Island, NY
G	9	Tasha Lima	5 ft 7 in (1.7 m)	Sr	Tilton School	Roslindale, MA
G	10	Sophie Baydanov	5 ft 9 in (1.75 m)	Jr	Morehead State	Vienna, Austria
G	12	Maddie Rice	5 ft 8 in (1.73 m)	So	St. Anne's-Belfield School	Charlottesville, VA
G	13	Carla Subirats	5 ft 5 in (1.65 m)	Fr	Institut Gorgs	Barcelona, Spain
F	14	Rayne Durant	6 ft 1 in (1.85 m)	So	Hamden Hall Country Day School	New Haven, CT
G	15	Sydney Watkins	5 ft 8 in (1.73 m)	RS Sr	Miami (OH)	Indianapolis, IN
F	21	Nia Chima	6 ft 1 in (1.85 m)	Fr	Crestwood Preparatory College	Toronto, ON
G	30	Ella Ner	5 ft 7 in (1.7 m)	Jr	Ramat Hashrom	Bene Atarot, Israel
F	55	Alex Gitchenko	5 ft 11 in (1.8 m)	Sr	Georgia State	Ashdod, Israel

Head coach

- Denise King (Rhode Island)

Assistant coach(es)

- Stefanie Murphy-Thorpe (Boston College)
- A.G. Hall (North Carolina Central)
- Evelyn Thompson (Auburn)

Legend

- (C) Team captain
- (S) Suspended
- (I) Ineligible
- (W) Walk-on
- Injured
- Current redshirt

Roster
Last update: December 17, 2024

== Schedule and results ==
Date time, TV	Rank^{#}	Opponent^{#}	Result	Record	Site (attendance) city, state
Non-conference regular season
November 4, 2024*; 6:00 p.m., ESPN+		at Colgate	L 62–74	0–1	Cotterell Court (426); Hamilton, NY
November 9, 2024*; 1:00 p.m., ESPN+		Holy Cross	L 49–61	0–2	Costello Athletic Center (276); Lowell, MA
November 12, 2024*; 8:00 p.m., B1G+		at Minnesota	L 37–82	0–3	Williams Arena (2,616); Minneapolis, MN
November 16, 2024*; 1:00 p.m., ESPN+		at Dartmouth	L 41–57	0–4	Leede Arena (473); Hanover, NH
November 20, 2024*; 6:00 p.m., ESPN+		Rhode Island	L 35–81	0–5	Costello Athletic Center (267); Lowell, MA
November 24, 2024*; 2:00 p.m., FloHoops		at Butler	L 44–69	0–6	Hinkle Fieldhouse (940); Indianapolis, IN
November 29, 2024*; 4:00 p.m.		vs. UNC Wilmington; Puerto Rico Clasico	L 40–56	0–7	Coliseo Rubén Rodríguez (100); Bayamón, PR
November 30, 2024*; 4:00 p.m.		vs. San Jose State; Puerto Rico Clasico	L 67–68	0–8	Coliseo Rubén Rodríguez (100); Bayamón, PR
December 7, 2024*; 12:00 p.m., NEC Front Row		at Le Moyne	W 69–56	1–8	Ted Grant Court (256); DeWitt, NY
December 10, 2024*; 6:00 p.m., ESPN+		Iona	W 49–38	2–8	Costello Athletic Center (243); Lowell, MA
December 12, 2024*; 6:00 p.m., NESN/ESPN+		Boston University	L 55–62	2–9	Costello Athletic Center (269); Lowell, MA
December 20, 2024*; 1:00 p.m., ESPN+		UMass	L 33–53	2–10	Costello Athletic Center (194); Lowell, MA
America East regular season
January 2, 2025; 6:00 p.m., ESPN+		Maine	L 39–54	2–11 (0-1)	Costello Athletic Center (188); Lowell, MA
January 4, 2025; 2:00 p.m., ESPN+		Albany	L 39–53	2–12 (0-2)	Costello Athletic Center (285); Lowell, MA
January 9, 2025; 11:00 a.m., ESPN+		at Vermont	L 52–77	2–13 (0–3)	Patrick Gym (3,024); Burlington, VT
January 11, 2025; 1:00 p.m., ESPN+		at NJIT	L 54–72	2–14 (0–4)	Wellness and Events Center (221); Newark, NJ
January 18, 2025; 1:00 p.m., ESPN+		Bryant	L 43–64	2–15 (0–5)	Costello Athletic Center (310); Lowell, MA
January 23, 2025; 6:00 p.m., ESPN+		at Maine	L 44–74	2–16 (0–6)	Memorial Gymnasium (978); Orono, ME
January 25, 2025; 1:00 p.m., ESPN+		at New Hampshire	W 56–54	3–16 (1–6)	Lundholm Gym (485); Durham, NH
January 30, 2025; 11:00 a.m., ESPN+		NJIT	L 38–52	3–17 (1–7)	Tsongas Center (3,204); Lowell, MA
February 1, 2025; 1:00 p.m., ESPN+		UMBC	L 48–56	3–18 (1–8)	Costello Athletic Center (273); Lowell, MA
February 6, 2025; 6:00 p.m., ESPN+		Binghamton	L 52–65	3–19 (1–9)	Costello Athletic Center (186); Lowell, MA
February 13, 2025; 11:00 a.m., ESPN+		at Albany	L 44–59	3–20 (1–10)	Broadview Center (3,232); Albany, NY
February 15, 2025; 1:00 p.m., ESPN+		New Hampshire	L 55–62	3–21 (1–11)	Costello Athletic Center (539); Lowell, MA
February 20, 2025; 6:00 p.m., ESPN+		at UMBC	L 51–53	3–22 (1–12)	Chesapeake Employers Insurance Arena (351); Catonsville, MD
February 22, 2025; 2:00 p.m., ESPN+		Vermont	L 35–57	3–23 (1–13)	Costello Athletic Center (512); Lowell, MA
February 27, 2025; 6:00 p.m., ESPN+		at Bryant	L 52–64	3–24 (1–14)	Chace Athletic Center (250); Smithfield, RI
March 1, 2025; 2:00 p.m., ESPN+		at Binghamton	L 42–72	3–25 (1–15)	Dr. Bai Lee Court (1,626); Vestal, NY
*Non-conference game. ^{#}Rankings from AP poll. (#) Tournament seedings in parentheses. All times are in Eastern.
