= 2024–25 Albany Great Danes women's basketball team =

American college basketball season

2024–25 Albany Great Danes women's basketball

America East regular-season champions

WBIT, first round
- Conference: America East Conference
- Record: 26–7 (14–2 America East)
- Head coach: Colleen Mullen (7th season)
- Associate head coach: Megan Methven
- Assistant coaches: Catherine Cassidy; Valerie Klopfer; Tiana Carter; Emily Bramanti
- Home arena: Broadview Center

2024–25 America East Conference women's basketball standings
| | Conf. | | | | Overall |
| Team | W | | L | PCT | W | | L | PCT |
|---|---|---|---|---|---|---|---|---|
| Albany | 14 | – | 2 | .875 | 26 | – | 7 | .788 |
| Vermont † | 13 | – | 3 | .813 | 21 | – | 13 | .618 |
| Bryant | 9 | – | 7 | .563 | 17 | – | 15 | .531 |
| Maine | 9 | – | 7 | .563 | 15 | – | 16 | .484 |
| NJIT | 8 | – | 8 | .500 | 11 | – | 19 | .367 |
| Binghamton | 7 | – | 9 | .438 | 15 | – | 15 | .500 |
| UMBC | 7 | – | 9 | .438 | 14 | – | 15 | .483 |
| New Hampshire | 4 | – | 12 | .250 | 10 | – | 20 | .333 |
| UMass Lowell | 1 | – | 15 | .063 | 3 | – | 25 | .107 |
† 2025 AmEast tournament winner

The 2024–25 Albany Great Danes women's basketball team represented the University at Albany, SUNY during the 2024–25 NCAA Division I women's basketball season. The Great Danes, led by seventh-year head coach Colleen Mullen, played their home games at the Broadview Center in Albany, New York as members of the America East Conference.

The Great Danes finished the season 27–7, 14–2 in America East play, to finish in first place. In the America East tournament, they defeated New Hampshire in the quarterfinals and Maine in the semifinals before losing to Vermont in the championship game. As regular-season champions, the Great Danes were granted an automatic bid to the WBIT where they lost to Saint Joseph's in the first round.

== Previous season ==
The Great Danes finished the 2023–24 season 25–7, 13–3 in America East play, to finish in second place. They defeated NJIT before falling to Vermont in the semifinals of the America East tournament. They received an automatic bid into the WNIT, where they fell to Colgate in the first round.

== Roster ==
2024–25 Albany Great Danes women's basketball team
Players
Coaches

| Pos. | # | Name | Height | Year | Previous school | Hometown |
|---|---|---|---|---|---|---|
| F | 0 | MaKayla Noble | 5 ft 10 in (1.78 m) | Fr | Salisbury High School | Salisbury, NC |
| F | 1 | Bella Stuart | 5 ft 11 in (1.8 m) | GS | New Hampshire | Clifton Park, NY |
| G | 2 | Laycee Drake | 5 ft 6 in (1.68 m) | Sr | UMBC | Hancock, NY |
| G | 3 | Lilly Phillips | 5 ft 11 in (1.8 m) | GS | Cambridge Central School | Greenwich, NY |
| F | 4 | Kaci Donovan | 6 ft 1 in (1.85 m) | GS | Monmouth | Owego, NY |
| G | 6 | Manuela Piljevic | 5 ft 10 in (1.78 m) | Fr | Holy Spirit College | Cordeaux Heights, Australia |
| G | 12 | Emma Hákonardóttir | 5 ft 11 in (1.8 m) | Fr | Fjölbrautaskóli Suðurlands | Thorlakshofn, Iceland |
| G | 13 | Martina Borrellas | 6 ft 1 in (1.85 m) | Fr | Bon Soleil | Barcelona, Spain |
| F | 20 | Kayla Cooper | 6 ft 0 in (1.83 m) | GS | Saint John's Catholic Prep | Frederick, MD |
| C | 21 | Gabriela Falcão | 6 ft 1 in (1.85 m) | Jr | La Salle | Figueira da Foz, Portugal |
| G | 23 | Meghan Huerter | 5 ft 11 in (1.8 m) | Sr | Providence | Clifton Park, NY |
| G | 24 | Abby Ray | 5 ft 8 in (1.73 m) | Sr | Saratoga Springs High School | Saratoga Springs, NY |
| G | 33 | Delanie Hill | 5 ft 7 in (1.7 m) | Fr | Providence High School | Charlotte, NC |
| G | 55 | Jessica Tomasetti | 5 ft 5 in (1.65 m) | GS | Mount St. Mary's | North Potomac, MD |

Head coach

- Colleen Mullen (New Hampshire)

Assistant coach(es)

- Megan Methven (Stonehill)
- Catherine Cassidy (Plattsburgh State)
- Valerie Klopfer (Wake Forest)
- Tiana Carter (Albany)
- Emily Bramanti (Stonehill)

Legend

- (C) Team captain
- (S) Suspended
- (I) Ineligible
- (W) Walk-on
- Injured
- Current redshirt

Roster
Last update: December 8, 2024

== Schedule and results ==
| Date time, TV | Rank^{#} | Opponent^{#} | Result | Record | Site (attendance) city, state |
Non-conference regular season
| November 8, 2024*; 7:00 p.m., ESPN+ | | Rhode Island | W 67–57 | 1–0 | Broadview Center (1,838); Albany, NY |
| November 13, 2024*; 8:00 p.m., ESPN+ | | at Dartmouth | W 58–53 | 2–0 | Leede Arena (767); Hanover, NH |
| November 16, 2024*; 2:00 p.m., ESPN+ | | Sacred Heart | W 61–49 | 3–0 | Broadview Center (1,231); Albany, NY |
| November 20, 2024*; 7:00 p.m., ACCNX | | at Syracuse | W 73–70 | 4–0 | JMA Wireless Dome (2,038); Syracuse, NY |
| November 23, 2024*; 7:00 p.m., ESPN+ | | Cornell | W 54–47 | 5–0 | Broadview Center (1,559); Albany, NY |
| November 27, 2024*; 2:00 p.m., ESPN+ | | RPI | W 90–42 | 6–0 | Broadview Center (1,007); Albany, NY |
| December 1, 2024*; 1:00 p.m., NEC Front Row | | at Stonehill | W 80–59 | 7–0 | Merkert Gymnasium (216); Easton, MA |
| December 7, 2024*; 2:00 p.m., ESPN+ | | at Siena; Albany Cup | L 65–70 | 7–1 | UHY Center (1,283); Loudonville, NY |
| December 10, 2024*; 6:00 p.m., ESPN+ | | at Boston University | W 72–36 | 8–1 | Case Gym (720); Boston, MA |
| December 14, 2024*; 2:00 p.m., ESPN+ | | St. Bonaventure | W 64–48 | 9–1 | Broadview Center (1,047); Albany, NY |
| December 16, 2024*; 6:30 p.m., ESPN+ | | Merrimack | W 79–64 | 10–1 | Broadview Center (1,047); Albany, NY |
| December 20, 2024*; 12:00 p.m., B1G+ | | at Wisconsin | L 59–69 | 10–2 | Kohl Center (5,820); Madison, WI |
| December 29, 2024*; 2:00 p.m., SECN+ | | at No. 6 LSU | L 61–83 | 10–3 | Pete Maravich Assembly Center (12,171); Baton Rouge, LA |
America East regular season
| January 2, 2025; 6:30 p.m., ESPN+ | | Vermont | W 64–55 | 11–3 (1–0) | Broadview Center (1,163); Albany, NY |
| January 4, 2025; 2:00 p.m., ESPN+ | | at UMass Lowell | W 53–39 | 12–3 (2–0) | Costello Athletic Center (285); Lowell, MA |
| January 9, 2025; 6:30 p.m., ESPN+ | | New Hampshire | W 59–32 | 13–3 (3–0) | Broadview Center (921); Albany, NY |
| January 11, 2025; 2:00 p.m., ESPN+ | | Maine | W 60–55 | 14–3 (4–0) | Broadview Center (1,282); Albany, NY |
| January 16, 2025; 6:00 p.m., ESPN+ | | at Bryant | W 55–40 | 15–3 (5–0) | Chace Athletic Center (202); Smithfield, RI |
| January 18, 2025; 2:00 p.m., ESPN+ | | Binghamton | W 79–55 | 16–3 (6–0) | Broadview Center (1,515); Albany, NY |
| January 23, 2025; 11:00 a.m., ESPN+ | | at UMBC | L 59–71 | 16–4 (6–1) | Chesapeake Employers Insurance Arena (3,108); Catonsville, MD |
| January 25, 2025; 1:00 p.m., ESPN+ | | at NJIT | W 75–59 | 17–4 (7–1) | Wellness and Events Center (233); Newark, NJ |
| February 1, 2025; 2:00 p.m., ESPN+ | | at Binghamton | W 65–54 | 18–4 (8–1) | Dr. Bai Lee Court (1,706); Vestal, NY |
| February 6, 2025; 6:30 p.m., ESPN+ | | Bryant | W 48–43 | 19–4 (9–1) | Broadview Center (949); Albany, NY |
| February 8, 2025; 2:00 p.m., ESPN+ | | at Vermont | L 50–59 | 19–5 (9–2) | Patrick Gym (1,282); Burlington, VT |
| February 13, 2025; 11:00 a.m., ESPN+ | | UMass Lowell | W 59–44 | 20–5 (10–2) | Broadview Center (3,232); Albany, NY |
| February 20, 2025; 6:00 p.m., ESPN+ | | at Maine | W 56–40 | 21–5 (11–2) | Memorial Gymnasium (1,123); Orono, ME |
| February 22, 2025; 12:00 p.m., ESPN+ | | at New Hampshire | W 67–49 | 22–5 (12–2) | Lundholm Gym (691); Durham, NH |
| February 27, 2025; 6:30 p.m., ESPN+ | | UMBC | W 68–60 | 23–5 (13–2) | Broadview Center (1,147); Albany, NY |
| March 1, 2025; 7:00 p.m., ESPN+ | | NJIT | W 73–52 | 24–5 (14–2) | Broadview Center (1,515); Albany, NY |
America East tournament
| March 6, 2025; 6:30 p.m., ESPN+ | (1) | (8) New Hampshire; Quarterfinals | W 66–44 | 25–5 | Broadview Center (1,016); Albany, NY |
| March 10, 2025; 6:30 p.m., ESPN+ | (1) | (4) Maine; Semifinals | W 49–41 | 26–5 | Broadview Center (1,156); Albany, NY |
| March 14, 2025; 5:00 p.m., ESPNU | (1) | (2) Vermont; Championship | L 55–62 | 26–6 | Broadview Center (2,238); Albany, NY |
WBIT
| March 20, 2025*; 7:00 p.m., ESPN+ | | (1) Saint Joseph's; First round | L 40–69 | 26–7 | Hagan Arena (342); Philadelphia, PA |
*Non-conference game. ^{#}Rankings from AP poll. (#) Tournament seedings in parentheses. All times are in Eastern.

== See also ==
- 2024–25 Albany Great Danes men's basketball team
