= 2024–25 Notre Dame Fighting Irish women's basketball team =

Intercollegiate basketball season

2024–25 Notre Dame Fighting Irish women's basketball

ACC regular season co-champions

NCAA tournament, Sweet Sixteen
- Conference: Atlantic Coast Conference

Ranking
- Coaches: No. 9
- AP: No. 10
- Record: 28–6 (16–2 ACC)
- Head coach: Niele Ivey (5th season)
- Associate head coach: Carol Owens (25th season)
- Assistant coaches: Michaela Mabrey (6th season); Charel Allen (3rd season)
- Home arena: Purcell Pavilion

2024–25 ACC women's basketball standings
	Conf.				Overall
Team	W		L	PCT	W		L	PCT
No. 9 NC State	16	–	2	.889	28	–	7	.800
No. 8 Notre Dame	16	–	2	.889	28	–	6	.824
No. 7 Duke †	14	–	4	.778	29	–	8	.784
No. 22 Florida State	13	–	5	.722	24	–	9	.727
No. 12 North Carolina	13	–	5	.722	29	–	8	.784
Louisville	13	–	5	.722	22	–	11	.667
California	12	–	6	.667	25	–	9	.735
Virginia Tech	9	–	9	.500	19	–	13	.594
Georgia Tech	9	–	9	.500	22	–	11	.667
Virginia	8	–	10	.444	17	–	15	.531
Stanford	8	–	10	.444	16	–	15	.516
Boston College	6	–	12	.333	16	–	18	.471
Syracuse	6	–	12	.333	12	–	18	.400
Clemson	6	–	12	.333	14	–	17	.452
Pittsburgh	5	–	13	.278	13	–	19	.406
Miami (FL)	4	–	14	.222	14	–	15	.483
Wake Forest	2	–	16	.111	9	–	20	.310
SMU	2	–	16	.111	10	–	20	.333
† 2025 ACC tournament winner Rankings from AP Poll

The 2024–25 Notre Dame Fighting Irish women's basketball team represented the University of Notre Dame during the 2024–25 NCAA Division I women's basketball season. The Fighting Irish were led by fifth-year head coach Niele Ivey and played their home games at Purcell Pavilion in Notre Dame, Indiana as members of the Atlantic Coast Conference.

The Fighting Irish started the season ranked sixth in the AP poll and won their first five games to start the season. This included a 102–58 victory over Purdue and a 74–61 defeat of number three USC. This saw the team rise to third in the rankings ahead of the Cayman Islands Classic. It was ultimately a disappointing trip to the Cayman Islands for the team as they went 0–2 in the tournament. They lost 76–68 to seventeenth ranked TCU and 78–67 to Utah. They dropped to tenth in the rankings following the tournament. The team turned its fortunes around with a return to the US as they defeated fourth ranked Texas in overtime 80–70 in the ACC–SEC Challenge. They also won their ACC opener against Syracuse. A defeat of second ranked Connecticut 79–68 in a rivalry game saw the Fighting Irish return to the number three ranking. The Fighting Irish would spend the next eight weeks holding onto the third ranking. From the Texas game, they went on a nineteen-game winning streak. The streak also included wins over seventeenth ranked North Carolina and Georgia Tech, twenty-first ranked California and eleventh ranked Duke. With the defeat of California, the Fighting Irish rose to second in the rankings, and then to the top spot after a defeat of Pittsburgh. They would only spend one week in at the number one ranking, and in that week they defeated Miami 82–42 and lost to thirteenth ranked NC State 104–95 in double overtime. They fell back to the third spot where they lost to twenty-fourth ranked Florida State 86–81 before defeating twenty-fifth ranked Louisville on the final day of the regular season.

The Fighting Irish finished the regular season 25–4 overall and 16–2 in ACC play to finish in a tie for first place. As the second seed in the ACC tournament, earned a bye into the Quarterfinals where they defeated seventh seed California, 73–64. They were defeated in the Semifinals by third seed and eleventh ranked Duke. They received an at-large bid to the NCAA tournament and were the three-seed in the Birmingham 3 region. They defeated fourteen-seed Stephen F. Austin and six-seed Michigan at home to advance to the Sweet Sixteen. There they faced two seed and sixth ranked TCU in a re-match of their Cayman Islands Classic game. They lost again to TCU, this time 71–62 to end their season. The Fighting Irish finished the season with a 28–6 record, and ranked tenth AP poll and ninth Coaches polls.

== Previous season ==
The Fighting Irish finished the season 28–7 overall and 13–5 in ACC play to finish in a three-way tie for second place. As the fourth seed in the ACC tournament, they earned a bye into the Quarterfinals where they defeated fifth seed Louisville. They defeated first seed Virginia Tech in the Semifinals and second seed NC State to win the title. It was their sixth overall title and first since 2019. They received the ACC's automatic bid to the NCAA Tournament, marking the third straight time the Fighting Irish qualified for the tournament. As the second seed in the Albany 1 region they defeated fifteenth seed Kent State in the First Round and seventh seed Ole Miss in the Second Round before losing to third seed Oregon State in the Sweet Sixteen to end their season.

== Offseason ==
=== Departures ===
Departures
Name	Number	Pos.	Height	Year	Hometown	Reason for departure
Jenna Brown	0	G	5'10"	(redshirt) Senior	Atlanta, Georgia	Graduated
Becky Obinma	10	F	6'2"	(redshirt) Senior	Menifee, California	Graduated
Anna DeWolfe	13	G	6'8"	(redshirt) Senior	Cumberland, Maine	Graduated
Natalija Marshall	15	F	6'5"	(redshirt) Junior	Queens, New York	Transferred to Miami (FL)

=== Incoming transfers ===
Incoming Transfers
Name	Number	Pos.	Height	Year	Hometown	Previous school
Liatu King	20	F	6'0"	(redshirt) Senior	Washington, D.C.	Pittsburgh
Liza Karlen	32	F	6'2"	(redshirt) Senior	Saint Paul, Minnesota	Marquette

=== 2024 recruiting class ===
College recruiting
Name	Hometown	School	Height	Weight	Commit date
Kate Koval; P	Kyiv, Ukraine	Long Island Lutheran	6 ft 4 in (1.93 m)	N/A	Nov 14, 2023
Kate Koval; P	Recruit ratings: ESPN: (98)				
Overall recruit ranking:
Note: In many cases, Scout, Rivals, 247Sports, On3, and ESPN may conflict in their listings of height and weight.; In these cases, the average was taken. ESPN grades are on a 100-point scale.; Sources:

== Roster ==
2024–25 Notre Dame Fighting Irish women's basketball team
Players
Coaches

Pos.	#	Name	Height	Year	Previous school	Hometown
G	2	Emma Risch (injured)	6 ft 1 in (1.85 m)	So	Palm Bay Magnet	Melbourne, FL
G	3	Hannah Hidalgo	5 ft 6 in (1.68 m)	So	Paul VI	Merchantville, NJ
G	5	Olivia Miles	5 ft 10 in (1.78 m)	RS Jr	Blair Academy	Phillipsburg, NJ
G	8	Cassandre Prosper	6 ft 3 in (1.91 m)	Jr	Cairine Wilson	Montreal, QC
F	10	Bella Tehrani (W)	6 ft 3 in (1.91 m)	Jr	St. Jean de Brebeuf	Hamilton, ON
G	11	Sonia Citron	6 ft 1 in (1.85 m)	Sr	The Ursuline School	Eastchester, NY
F	13	Kate Koval	6 ft 5 in (1.96 m)	Fr	Long Island Lutheran	Kyiv, Ukraine
G	14	KK Bransford (injured) (redshirt)	5 ft 11 in (1.8 m)	Jr	Mount Notre Dame	Cincinnati, OH
G	15	Luci Jensen (W)	5 ft 10 in (1.78 m)	Fr	Brookfield Academy	Brookfield, WI
F	20	Liatu King	6 ft 0 in (1.83 m)	RS Sr	Pittsburgh	Washington, D.C.
F	21	Maddy Westbeld	6 ft 3 in (1.91 m)	RS Sr	Fairmont	Kettering, OH
F	22	Kylee Watson (injured) (redshirt)	6 ft 4 in (1.93 m)	Sr	Oregon	Linwood, NJ
G	25	Sarah Cernugel	5 ft 4 in (1.63 m)	RS Sr	Hinsdale Central	Westmont, IL
F	32	Liza Karlen	6 ft 2 in (1.88 m)	RS Sr	Marquette	St. Paul, MN

Head coach

- Niele Ivey (Notre Dame)

Assistant coach(es)

- Carol Owens (Northern Illinois)
- Michaela Mabrey (Notre Dame)
- Charel Allen (Notre Dame)

Legend

- (C) Team captain
- (S) Suspended
- (I) Ineligible
- (W) Walk-on
- Injured
- Current redshirt

Roster

== Schedule and results ==
Date time, TV	Rank^{#}	Opponent^{#}	Result	Record	High points	High rebounds	High assists	Site (attendance) city, state
Exhibition
October 30, 2024*; 7:00 p.m.	No. 6	Davenport	W 101–41	–	31 – Hidalgo	14 – King	9 – Tied	Purcell Pavilion (6,253); Notre Dame, IN
Regular season
November 4, 2024*; 5:00 p.m., ACCN	No. 6	Mercyhurst	W 105–61	1–0	24 – King	11 – King	10 – Miles	Purcell Pavilion (7,183); Notre Dame, IN
November 10, 2024*; 7:00 p.m., FS1	No. 6	at Purdue	W 102–58	2–0	28 – Hidalgo	15 – King	4 – Koval	Mackey Arena (5,854); West Lafayette, IN
November 13, 2024*; 7:00 p.m., ACCNX/ESPN+	No. 6	James Madison	W 92–46	3–0	24 – Hidalgo	16 – Koval	8 – Miles	Purcell Pavilion (6,716); Notre Dame, IN
November 17, 2024*; 2:00 p.m., ESPN+	No. 6	at Lafayette	W 91–55	4–0	29 – Hidalgo	19 – Koval	7 – Miles	Kirby Sports Center (2,329); Easton, PA
November 23, 2024*; 4:00 p.m., NBC	No. 6	at No. 3 USC	W 74–61	5–0	24 – Hidalgo	11 – King	8 – Hidalgo	Galen Center (7,894); Los Angeles, CA
November 29, 2024*; 5:00 p.m., FloHoops	No. 3	vs. No. 17 TCU; Cayman Islands Classic	L 68–76	5–1	27 – Hidalgo	13 – King	5 – Hidalgo	John Gray Gymnasium (1,034); Georgetown, Cayman Islands
November 30, 2024*; 5:00 p.m., FloHoops	No. 3	vs. Utah; Cayman Islands Classic	L 67–78	5–2	22 – Citron	11 – King	7 – Miles	John Gray Gymnasium (885); Georgetown, Cayman Islands
December 5, 2024*; 7:00 p.m., ESPN	No. 10	No. 4 Texas; ACC–SEC Challenge	W 80–70 ^{OT}	6–2	30 – Hidalgo	12 – King	6 – Miles	Purcell Pavilion (9,149); Notre Dame, IN
December 8, 2024; 12:00 p.m., ACCN	No. 10	at Syracuse	W 93–62	7–2 (1–0)	25 – Citron	12 – King	8 – Miles	JMA Wireless Dome (4,440); Syracuse, NY
December 12, 2024*; 7:00 p.m., ESPN	No. 8	No. 2 Connecticut; Rivalry	W 79–68	8–2	29 – Hidalgo	12 – King	8 – Hidalgo	Purcell Pavilion (9,149); Notre Dame, IN
December 15, 2024*; 2:00 p.m., ACCNX/ESPN+	No. 8	Eastern Michigan	W 118–49	9–2	27 – Hidalgo	15 – King	8 – Miles	Purcell Pavilion (7,936); Notre Dame, IN
December 22, 2024*; 12:00 p.m., ACCNX	No. 3	Loyola (MD)	W 97–54	10–2	33 – Hidalgo	11 – Miles	10 – Miles	Purcell Pavilion (7,746); Notre Dame, IN
December 29, 2024; 12:00 p.m., ACCN	No. 3	Virginia	W 95–54	11–2 (2–0)	28 – Hidalgo	12 – King	14 – Miles	Purcell Pavilion (9,149); Notre Dame, IN
January 5, 2025; 1:00 p.m., ESPN	No. 3	at No. 17 North Carolina	W 76–66	12–2 (3–0)	24 – Hidalgo	15 – King	5 – Tied	Carmichael Arena (4,785); Chapel Hill, NC
January 9, 2025; 7:00 p.m., ACCNX/ESPN+	No. 3	Wake Forest	W 100–64	13–2 (4–0)	23 – Hidalgo	6 – Tied	9 – Miles	Purcell Pavilion (6,753); Notre Dame, IN
January 12, 2025; 2:00 p.m., The CW	No. 3	at Clemson	W 67–58	14–2 (5–0)	23 – King	11 – King	9 – Miles	Littlejohn Coliseum (3,816); Clemson, SC
January 16, 2025; 6:00 p.m., ACCN	No. 3	No. 17 Georgia Tech	W 81–66	15–2 (6–0)	21 – Citron	12 – King	6 – Citron	Purcell Pavilion (7,786); Notre Dame, IN
January 19, 2025; 6:00 p.m., ACCN	No. 3	SMU	W 88–64	16–2 (7–0)	23 – Hidalgo	10 – Tied	6 – Miles	Purcell Pavilion (7,904); Notre Dame, IN
January 23, 2025; 7:00 p.m., ACCNX/ESPN+	No. 3	at Boston College	W 89–63	17–2 (8–0)	23 – Hidalgo	9 – Citron	6 – Citron	Conte Forum (2,879); Chestnut Hill, MA
January 30, 2025; 6:00 p.m., ACCNX/ESPN+	No. 3	at Virginia Tech	W 77–61	18–2 (9–0)	30 – Hidalgo	12 – King	5 – Hidalgo	Cassell Coliseum (5,750); Blacksburg, VA
February 2, 2025; 12:00 p.m., ESPN2	No. 3	at Louisville	W 89–71	19–2 (10–0)	34 – Hidalgo	12 – King	5 – Hidalgo	KFC Yum! Center (11,603); Louisville, KY
February 6, 2025; 8:30 p.m., ESPN	No. 3	Stanford	W 96–47	20–2 (11–0)	24 – Hidalgo	8 – King	5 – Tied	Purcell Pavilion (7,528); Notre Dame, IN
February 9, 2025; 2:00 p.m., ACCN	No. 3	No. 21 California	W 91–52	21–2 (12–0)	24 – Hidalgo	13 – King	6 – Miles	Purcell Pavilion (8,864); Notre Dame, IN
February 13, 2025; 8:00 p.m., ACCN	No. 2	at Pittsburgh	W 88–57	22–2 (13–0)	28 – Miles	10 – Citron	5 – Tied	Peterson Events Center (1,774); Pittsburgh, PA
February 17, 2025; 6:00 p.m., ESPN	No. 1	No. 11 Duke	W 64–49	23–2 (14–0)	19 – Hidalgo	11 – King	4 – Hidalgo	Purcell Pavilion (9,063); Notre Dame, IN
February 20, 2025; 7:00 p.m., ACCN	No. 1	at Miami (FL)	W 82–42	24–2 (15–0)	19 – Citron	13 – King	6 – Miles	Watsco Center (4,614); Coral Gables, FL
February 23, 2025; 12:00 p.m., ESPN	No. 1	at No. 13 NC State; College GameDay	L 95–104 ^{2OT}	24–3 (15–1)	26 – Hidalgo	14 – King	3 – Tied	Reynolds Coliseum (5,500); Raleigh, NC
February 27, 2025; 8:00 p.m., ACCN	No. 3	No. 24 Florida State	L 81–86	24–4 (15–2)	21 – Citron	11 – King	6 – Miles	Purcell Pavilion (8,761); Notre Dame, IN
March 2, 2025; 12:00 p.m., ESPN	No. 3	No. 25 Louisville; College GameDay	W 72–59	25–4 (16–2)	20 – Hidalgo	11 – King	6 – Hidalgo	Purcell Pavilion (8,852); Notre Dame, IN
ACC Women's Tournament
March 7, 2025*; 5:00 p.m., ESPN2	(2) No. 6	vs. (7) California; Quarterfinals	W 73–64	26–4	25 – Hidalgo	5 – Tied	6 – Miles	Greensboro Coliseum (7,108); Greensboro, NC
March 8, 2025*; 2:30 p.m., ESPN2	(2) No. 6	vs. (3) No. 11 Duke; Semifinals	L 56–61	26–5	23 – Hidalgo	5 – Karlen	3 – Tied	Greensboro Coliseum (10,894); Greensboro, NC
NCAA Women's Tournament
March 21, 2025*; 2:00 p.m., ESPN	(3 B3) No. 8	(14 B3) Stephen F. Austin; First Round	W 106–54	27–5	24 – Tied	10 – Karlen	8 – Miles	Purcell Pavilion (7,542); Notre Dame, IN
March 23, 2025*; 1:00 p.m., ABC	(3 B3) No. 8	(6 B3) Michigan; Second Round	W 76–55	28–5	21 – Hidalgo	15 – King	5 – Miles	Purcell Pavilion (8,505); Notre Dame, IN
March 29, 2025*; 1:00 p.m., ABC	(3 B3) No. 8	vs. (2 B3) No. 6 TCU; Sweet Sixteen	L 62–71	28–6	17 – King	10 – King	3 – Miles	Legacy Arena (11,433); Birmingham, AL
*Non-conference game. ^{#}Rankings from AP Poll. (#) Tournament seedings in parentheses. B3=Birmingham 3. All times are in Eastern.

== Rankings ==
Ranking movements Legend: ██ Increase in ranking ██ Decrease in ranking ( ) = First-place votes
	Week																				
Poll	Pre	1	2	3	4	5	6	7	8	9	10	11	12	13	14	15	16	17	18	19	Final
AP	6	6	6	3 (3)	10	8	3 (1)	3 (1)	3 (1)	3 (2)	3 (2)	3 (2)	3	3	2	1 (16)	3	6	8	8	10
Coaches	5	5	5	3 (5)	10	9	4	4	3	3	3	3	3	3	2	1 (23)	4 (1)	6	8	8	9
