= 2024–25 Binghamton Bearcats women's basketball team =

American college basketball season

2024–25 Binghamton Bearcats women's basketball
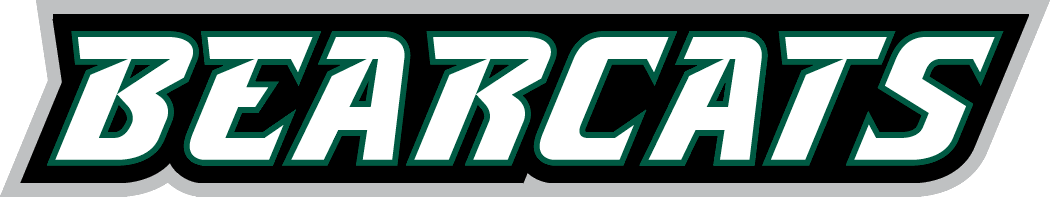
- Conference: America East Conference
- Record: 15–15 (7–9 America East)
- Head coach: Mary Grimes (1st season)
- Assistant coaches: Ali Bouman; Zakiya Saunders
- Home arena: Dr. Bai Lee Court

2024–25 America East Conference women's basketball standings
	Conf.				Overall
Team	W		L	PCT	W		L	PCT
Albany	14	–	2	.875	26	–	7	.788
Vermont †	13	–	3	.813	21	–	13	.618
Bryant	9	–	7	.563	17	–	15	.531
Maine	9	–	7	.563	15	–	16	.484
NJIT	8	–	8	.500	11	–	19	.367
Binghamton	7	–	9	.438	15	–	15	.500
UMBC	7	–	9	.438	14	–	15	.483
New Hampshire	4	–	12	.250	10	–	20	.333
UMass Lowell	1	–	15	.063	3	–	25	.107
† 2025 AmEast tournament winner

The 2024–25 Binghamton Bearcats women's basketball team represented Binghamton University during the 2024–25 NCAA Division I women's basketball season. The Bearcats, led by first-year head coach Mary Grimes, played their home games on Dr. Bai Lee Court in Binghamton University Events Center in Vestal, New York as members of the America East Conference.

== Previous season ==
The Bearcats finished the 2023–24 season 14–17, 8–8 in America East play to finish in a tie for fourth place. In the America East tournament, they defeated Bryant in the quarterfinals, before falling to top-seeded and eventual tournament champions Maine in the semifinals.

On March 29, 2024, the school announced that they would be parting ways with head coach Bethann Shapiro Ord, ending her six-year tenure at the helm. Nearly a month later, on April 24, the school announced that they would be hiring Le Moyne head coach Mary Grimes as the Bearcats' next head coach.

== Roster ==
2024–25 Binghamton Bearcats women's basketball team
Players
Coaches

Pos.	#	Name	Height	Year	Previous school	Hometown
G	0	Yanniah Boyd	5 ft 11 in (1.8 m)	So	Riverdale Baptist School	Frederick, Maryland
G	2	Kaylee Krysztof	5 ft 9 in (1.75 m)	So	Depew High School	Buffalo, New York
G	3	Kaia Goode	5 ft 4 in (1.63 m)	Jr	Le Moyne	Rochester, New York
F	4	Kendall Bennett	6 ft 2 in (1.88 m)	So	Germantown Academy	Philadelphia, Pennsylvania
G	5	Meghan Casey	5 ft 9 in (1.75 m)	Jr	The Ursuline School	White Plains, New York
G/F	10	Camryn Fauria	6 ft 0 in (1.83 m)	Jr	Bishop Feehan High School	Foxborough, Massachusetts
G	12	Samantha Baker	6 ft 0 in (1.83 m)	Fr	Nazareth High School	Nazareth, Pennsylvania
G	20	Bella Pucci	5 ft 9 in (1.75 m)	So	Fairport High School	Rochester, New York
G	22	Leah Middleton	5 ft 11 in (1.8 m)	So	Le Moyne	Auburn, New York
G	24	Jadyn Weltz	5 ft 7 in (1.7 m)	RS Jr	O'Gorman High School	Timmins, Ontario
C	32	Abby Misier	6 ft 5 in (1.96 m)	Fr	Hightstown High School	Hightstown, New Jersey
F	34	Marisa Smith	6 ft 3 in (1.91 m)	Fr	Johnson City High School	Johnson City, New York

Head coach

- Mary Grimes (Siena)

Assistant coach(es)

- Ali Bouman (Davenport)
- Zakiya Saunders (Central Florida)

Legend

- (C) Team captain
- (S) Suspended
- (I) Ineligible
- (W) Walk-on
- Injured
- Current redshirt

Roster
Last update: December 10, 2024

== Schedule and results ==
Date time, TV	Rank^{#}	Opponent^{#}	Result	Record	Site (attendance) city, state
Non-conference regular season
November 4, 2024*; 6:07 pm, ESPN+		Pitt–Johnstown	W 79–34	1–0	Dr. Bai Lee Court (1,008); Vestal, NY
November 7, 2024*; 7:30 pm, ESPN+		Akron	W 66–50	2–0	Dr. Bai Lee Court (1,631); Vestal, NY
November 9, 2024*; 1:00 pm, ESPN+		at St. Bonaventure	L 61–82	2–1	Reilly Center (347); St. Bonaventure, NY
November 14, 2024*; 7:00 pm, ESPN+		at Cornell	L 51–68	2–2	Newman Arena (675); Ithaca, NY
November 17, 2024*; 1:30 pm, ESPN+		Pittsburgh	L 56–61	2–3	Dr. Bai Lee Court (1,207); Vestal, NY
November 22, 2024*; 6:00 pm, NEC Front Row		at LIU	W 65–54	3–3	Steinberg Wellness Center (250); Brooklyn, NY
November 25, 2024*; 11:00 am, ESPN+		at Canisius	W 68–58	4–3	Koessler Athletic Center (2,196); Buffalo, NY
November 30, 2024*; 2:00 pm, ESPN+		Loyola (MD)	W 62–46	5–3	Dr. Bai Lee Court (1,060); Vestal, NY
December 4, 2024*; 6:00 pm, ESPN+		at Buffalo	L 51–74	5–4	Alumni Arena (1,005); Amherst, NY
December 15, 2024*; 2:00 pm, ESPN+		at Siena	W 64–62	6–4	UHY Center (503); Loudonville, NY
December 18, 2024*; 7:30 pm, ESPN+		Syracuse	L 60–87	6–5	Dr. Bai Lee Court (2,372); Vestal, NY
December 20, 2024*; 6:07 pm, ESPN+		Molloy	W 67–40	7–5	Dr. Bai Lee Court (916); Vestal, NY
December 30, 2024*; 5:00 pm, ESPN+		SUNY Geneseo	W 75–42	8–5	Dr. Bai Lee Court (1,103); Vestal, NY
America East regular season
January 2, 2025; 4:30 pm, ESPN+		at NJIT	L 49–58	8–6 (0–1)	Wellness and Events Center (277); Newark, NJ
January 4, 2025; 2:00 pm, ESPN+		at UMBC	W 60–50	9–6 (1–1)	Chesapeake Employers Insurance Arena (355); Catonsville, MD
January 9, 2025; 6:07 pm, ESPN+		Maine	W 69–59	10–6 (2–1)	Dr. Bai Lee Court (1,011); Vestal, NY
January 11, 2025; 2:00 pm, ESPN+		New Hampshire	W 67–44	11–6 (3–1)	Dr. Bai Lee Court (1,126); Vestal, NY
January 16, 2025; 11:00 am, ESPN+		Vermont	L 46–55	11–7 (3–2)	Dr. Bai Lee Court (4,627); Vestal, NY
January 18, 2025; 2:30 pm, ESPN+		at Albany	L 55–79	11–8 (3–3)	Broadview Center (1,515); Albany, NY
January 25, 2025; 2:00 pm, ESPN+		Bryant	L 54–68	11–9 (3–4)	Dr. Bai Lee Court (1,758); Vestal, NY
January 30, 2025; 6:00 pm, ESPN+		at Vermont	L 40–53	11–10 (3–5)	Patrick Gym (817); Burlington, VT
February 1, 2025; 2:00 pm, ESPN+		Albany	L 54–65	11–11 (3–6)	Dr. Bai Lee Court (1,706); Vestal, NY
February 6, 2025; 6:00 pm, ESPN+		at UMass Lowell	W 65–52	12–11 (4–6)	Costello Athletic Center (186); Lowell, MA
February 8, 2025; 4:00 pm, ESPN+		at Bryant	L 62–68	12–12 (4–7)	Chace Athletic Center (362); Smithfield, RI
February 13, 2025; 6:07 pm, ESPN+		UMBC	W 58–48	13–12 (5–7)	Dr. Bai Lee Court (1,103); Vestal, NY
February 15, 2025; 2:00 pm, ESPN+		NJIT	W 65–55	14–12 (6–7)	Dr. Bai Lee Court (1,527); Vestal, NY
February 20, 2025; 6:00 pm, ESPN+		at New Hampshire	L 38–65	14–13 (6–8)	Lundholm Gym (182); Durham, NH
February 22, 2025; 1:00 pm, ESPN+		at Maine	L 53–54	14–14 (6–9)	Memorial Gymnasium (1,095); Orono, ME
March 1, 2025; 2:00 pm, ESPN+		UMass Lowell	W 72–42	15–14 (7–9)	Dr. Bai Lee Court (1,626); Vestal, NY
America East tournament
March 6, 2025; 6:00 pm, ESPN+	(6)	at (3) Bryant; Quarterfinals	L 63–66	15–15	Chace Athletic Center (222); Smithfield, RI
*Non-conference game. ^{#}Rankings from AP Poll. (#) Tournament seedings in parentheses. All times are in Eastern.
