= 2024–25 Duke Blue Devils women's basketball team =

Intercollegiate basketball season

2024–25 Duke Blue Devils women's basketball

ACC Tournament champions Ball Dawgs Classic champions

NCAA tournament, Elite Eight
- Conference: Atlantic Coast Conference

Ranking
- Coaches: No. 7
- AP: No. 7
- Record: 29–8 (14–4 ACC)
- Head coach: Kara Lawson (5th season)
- Associate head coach: Tia Jackson (5th season)
- Assistant coaches: Kyra Elzy (1st season); Karen Lange (3rd season); Karen Middleton (2nd season); Pierre Miller (2nd season)
- Home arena: Cameron Indoor Stadium

2024–25 ACC women's basketball standings
	Conf.				Overall
Team	W		L	PCT	W		L	PCT
No. 9 NC State	16	–	2	.889	28	–	7	.800
No. 8 Notre Dame	16	–	2	.889	28	–	6	.824
No. 7 Duke †	14	–	4	.778	29	–	8	.784
No. 22 Florida State	13	–	5	.722	24	–	9	.727
No. 12 North Carolina	13	–	5	.722	29	–	8	.784
Louisville	13	–	5	.722	22	–	11	.667
California	12	–	6	.667	25	–	9	.735
Virginia Tech	9	–	9	.500	19	–	13	.594
Georgia Tech	9	–	9	.500	22	–	11	.667
Virginia	8	–	10	.444	17	–	15	.531
Stanford	8	–	10	.444	16	–	15	.516
Boston College	6	–	12	.333	16	–	18	.471
Syracuse	6	–	12	.333	12	–	18	.400
Clemson	6	–	12	.333	14	–	17	.452
Pittsburgh	5	–	13	.278	13	–	19	.406
Miami (FL)	4	–	14	.222	14	–	15	.483
Wake Forest	2	–	16	.111	9	–	20	.310
SMU	2	–	16	.111	10	–	20	.333
† 2025 ACC tournament winner Rankings from AP Poll

The 2024–25 Duke Blue Devils women's basketball team represented Duke University during the 2024–25 NCAA Division I women's basketball season. The Blue Devils were led by fifth-year head coach Kara Lawson and played their home games at Cameron Indoor Stadium in Durham, North Carolina as members of the Atlantic Coast Conference.

The Blue Devils started the season ranked eleventh in the AP poll and won their first two games. They then traveled to College Park, Maryland to face eighteenth ranked Maryland, where they lost 85–80. The loss saw them drop to sixteenth in the rankings, where they won three games before the Thanksgiving tournaments. Duke traveled to Nevada to participate in the Ball Dawgs Classic. There they defeated ninth ranked Kansas State and eighth ranked Oklahoma to win the championship. They defeated Oklahoma in a high scoring final 109–99, in overtime. The Blue Devils won a game against Columbia on their return to the East Coast, before facing third ranked South Carolina in the ACC–SEC Challenge. They lost in Columbia 81–70 and were ranked eighth at the time. The Blue Devils followed that with a win in their ACC opener against Virginia Tech. They lost their final non-conference game of the season at South Florida 65–56. They won two games in ACC play, including a dominant 69–31 victory over Pittsburgh before facing rival North Carolina. The Blue Devils lost in Chapel Hill, in overtime 53–46. Duke fell to sixteenth in the polls in the next rankings, but went on a five game winning streak. The winning streak included two defeats of eighteenth ranked teams in California and Georgia Tech. The winning streak was broken by another rival, this time tenth ranked NC State, 89–83. The Blue Devils went 6–2 over their final eight games of the season. The two losses were to first ranked Notre Dame and Louisville in back-to-back games. The defeated eighth ranked North Carolina and twenty-fourth ranked Florida State to finish the regular season.

The Blue Devils finished the regular season 23–7 overall and 14–4 in ACC play to finish in third place. As the third seed in the ACC tournament, earned a bye into the quarterfinals, where they defeated sixth seed Louisville, 61–48. They defeated second seed and sixth ranked Notre Dame 61–56 in the semifinals. They won the final 76–62 over top seed, seventh ranked, rival NC State. The Blue Devils defeated three teams they lost to during the regular season on the way to their tournament title. Sophomore Oluchi Okananwa was named tournament MVP and Ashlon Jackson was named to the All-Tournament First Team. As tournament champions, they received an automatic bid to the NCAA tournament and were the two-seed in the Birmingham 2 region. They defeated fifteen seed Lehigh and ten seed Oregon at home to advance to the Sweet Sixteen. There they faced three seed and twelfth ranked North Carolina for a third time this season. After splitting the regular season games 1–1, Duke prevailed in the tournament to advance to the Elite Eight. There they lost to first seed and second ranked South Carolina 54–50 to end their season. The Blue Devils finished the season with a 29–8 record, and ranked seventh in both the AP and Coaches polls. Their 29 wins were the most since 2012–13.

== Previous season ==
The Blue Devils finished the season 22–12 overall and 11–7 in ACC play to finish in a tie for seventh place. As the seventh seed in the ACC tournament, they defeated tenth seed Georgia Tech in the second round before losing to NC State in the quarterfinals. They received an at-large bid to the NCAA Tournament, marking the second straight year the Blue Devils qualified for the tournament. As the seventh seed in the Portland 3 region they defeated tenth seed Richmond in the first round and upset second seed Ohio State in the second round before losing to third seed Connecticut in the Sweet Sixteen to end their season.

== Off-season ==
=== Departures ===
Departures
Name	Number	Pos.	Height	Year	Hometown	Reason for departure
Camilla Emsbo	21	F	6'5"	Graduate student	Lakewood, Colorado	Graduated
Kennedy Brown	42	C	6'6"	Senior	Derby, Kansas	Graduated

=== Incoming transfers ===
Incoming transfers
Name	Number	Pos.	Height	Year	Hometown	Previous school
Riley Nelson	11	G	6'2"	Sophomore	Clarksburg, Maryland	Maryland

=== Recruiting class ===
College recruiting
Name	Hometown	School	Height	Weight	Commit date
Jenessa Cotton; F	Orange, California	Mater Dei	6 ft 2 in (1.88 m)	N/A	
Jenessa Cotton; F	Recruit ratings: ESPN: (92)				
Toby Fournier; F	Toronto, Canada	Crestwood Prep	6 ft 2 in (1.88 m)	N/A	
Toby Fournier; F	Recruit ratings: ESPN: (97)				
Olivia Martin; G	Gaithersburg, Maryland	Quince Orchard	5 ft 6 in (1.68 m)	N/A	
Olivia Martin; G	Recruit ratings: ESPN: (NR)				
Arianna Roberson; C	San Antonio, Texas	Clark	6 ft 4 in (1.93 m)	N/A	
Arianna Roberson; C	Recruit ratings: ESPN: (97)				
Overall recruit ranking:
Note: In many cases, Scout, Rivals, 247Sports, On3, and ESPN may conflict in their listings of height and weight.; In these cases, the average was taken. ESPN grades are on a 100-point scale.; Sources:

== Roster ==
2024–25 Duke Blue Devils women's basketball team
Players
Coaches

Pos.	#	Name	Height	Year	Previous school	Hometown
G	2	Vanessa de Jesus	5 ft 8 in (1.73 m)	GS	Sierra Canyon	Valencia, CA
G	3	Ashlon Jackson	6 ft 0 in (1.83 m)	Jr	Hardin-Jefferson	China, TX
G/F	4	Jadyn Donovan	6 ft 0 in (1.83 m)	So	Sidwell Friends	Washington, D.C.
G	5	Oluchi Okananwa	5 ft 10 in (1.78 m)	So	Worcester Academy	Boston, MA
G	7	Louann Battiston	5 ft 5 in (1.65 m)	So	Liege Panthers	Montigny-le-Tilleul, Belgium
G	11	Riley Nelson	6 ft 2 in (1.88 m)	So	Bullis School; Maryland	Clarksburg, MD
F	12	Delaney Thomas	6 ft 3 in (1.91 m)	So	St. John's College	Charles Town, WV
F	13	Jordan Wood	6 ft 4 in (1.93 m)	So	Carmel	Chicago, IL
G	15	Emma Koabel	5 ft 11 in (1.8 m)	Jr	Niagara Prep	Port Colborne, ON
C	21	Arianna Roberson	6 ft 4 in (1.93 m)	Fr	Clark	San Antonio, TX
G	22	Taina Mair	5 ft 9 in (1.75 m)	Jr	Brooks School; Boston College	Boston, MA
G	24	Reigan Richardson	5 ft 11 in (1.8 m)	Sr	Cannon School; Georgia	Charlotte, NC
F	35	Toby Fournier	6 ft 2 in (1.88 m)	Fr	Crestwood Prep	Toronto, Canada
F	42	Jenessa Cotton	6 ft 2 in (1.88 m)	Fr	Mater Dei	Orange, CA
G	53	Olivia Martin	5 ft 6 in (1.68 m)	Fr	Quince Orchard	Gaithersburg, MD

Head coach

- Kara Lawson (Tennessee)

Assistant coach(es)

- Tia Jackson (Iowa)
- Kyra Elzy (Tennessee)
- Karen Lange (Iowa)
- Karen Middleton (South Carolina)
- Pierre Miller (Presbyterian)

Legend

- (C) Team captain
- (S) Suspended
- (I) Ineligible
- (W) Walk-on
- Injured
- Current redshirt

Roster
Last update: August 19, 2024

== Schedule and results ==
Date time, TV	Rank^{#}	Opponent^{#}	Result	Record	High points	High rebounds	High assists	Site (attendance) city, state
Regular season
November 4, 2024*; 11:00 a.m., ACCNX/ESPN+	No. 11	Radford	W 89–36	1–0	13 – Wood	9 – Donovan	3 – Mair	Cameron Indoor Stadium (1,137); Durham, NC
November 7, 2024*; 7:00 p.m., ESPN+	No. 11	at Liberty	W 83–67	2–0	22 – Jackson	6 – Tied	6 – Jackson	Liberty Arena (2,845); Lynchburg, VA
November 10, 2024*; 1:00 p.m., FS1	No. 11	at No. 18 Maryland; Rivalry	L 80–85	2–1	15 – Fournier	10 – Donovan	4 – Tied	Xfinity Center (9,042); College Park, MD
November 14, 2024*; 7:00 p.m., ACCNX/ESPN+	No. 16	Dayton	W 84–49	3–1	17 – Wood	9 – Donovan	4 – Mair	Cameron Indoor Stadium (1,976); Durham, NC
November 17, 2024*; 3:30 p.m., CBSSN	No. 16	at South Dakota State	W 75–71	4–1	23 – Donovan	15 – Donovan	4 – Tied	First Bank and Trust Arena (4,582); Brookings, SD
November 21, 2024*; 7:00 p.m., ACCN	No. 14	at Belmont	W 79–47	5–1	25 – Fournier	13 – Wood	4 – Wood	Cameron Indoor Stadium (2,147); Durham, NC
November 25, 2024*; 3:00 p.m., FloHoops	No. 13	vs. No. 9 Kansas State; Ball Dawgs Classic Semifinal	W 73–62	6–1	30 – Jackson	8 – Thomas	7 – Mair	Lee's Family Forum; Henderson, NV
November 27, 2024*; 4:00 p.m., FloHoops	No. 13	vs. No. 8 Oklahoma; Ball Dawgs Classic Championship Game	W 109–99 ^{OT}	7–1	35 – Richardson	5 – Donovan	9 – Mair	Lee's Family Forum; Henderson, NV
December 1, 2024*; 12:00 p.m., ACCN	No. 13	Columbia	W 77–61	8–1	19 – Richardson	7 – Tied	6 – de Jesus	Cameron Indoor Stadium (2,228); Durham, NC
December 5, 2024*; 9:00 p.m., ESPN	No. 8	at No. 3 South Carolina; ACC–SEC Challenge	L 70–81	8–2	14 – Tied	8 – Donovan	5 – Donovan	Colonial Life Arena (15,677); Columbia, SC
December 8, 2024; 4:00 p.m., ACCN	No. 8	Virginia Tech	W 81–59	9–2 (1–0)	27 – Fournier	12 – Okananwa	7 – Richardson	Cameron Indoor Stadium (2,328); Durham, NC
December 18, 2024*; 7:00 p.m., ACCN	No. 9	Wofford	W 93–58	10–2	23 – Fournier	11 – Donovan	10 – Richardson	Cameron Indoor Stadium (1,768); Durham, NC
December 21, 2024*; 1:00 p.m., ESPNU	No. 9	at South Florida	L 56–65	10–3	11 – Fournier	9 – Okananwa	4 – Tied	Yuengling Center (5,735); Tampa, FL
January 2, 2025; 7:00 p.m., ACCNX/ESPN+	No. 14	at Boston College	W 86–59	11–3 (2–0)	14 – Tied	10 – Donovan	4 – Mair	Conte Forum (2,273); Chestnut Hill, MA
January 5, 2025; 12:00 p.m., ACCN	No. 14	Pittsburgh	W 69–31	12–3 (3–0)	13 – Richardson	7 – Wood	3 – Tied	Cameron Indoor Stadium (2,550); Durham, NC
January 9, 2025; 7:00 p.m., ACCN	No. 14	at No. 19 North Carolina; Rivalry	L 46–53 ^{OT}	12–4 (3–1)	10 – Jackson	11 – Donovan	2 – Mair	Carmichael Arena (4,296); Chapel Hill, NC
January 12, 2025; 12:00 p.m., ACCN	No. 14	at Virginia	W 60–55	13–4 (4–1)	17 – Okananwa	7 – Tied	6 – Mair	John Paul Jones Arena (5,203); Charlottesville, VA
January 16, 2025; 8:00 p.m., ACCN	No. 16	No. 18 California	W 72–38	14–4 (5–1)	23 – Fournier	11 – Fournier	5 – Mair	Cameron Indoor Stadium (2,428); Durham, NC
January 19, 2025; 1:00 p.m., ESPN2	No. 16	Stanford	W 74–49	15–4 (6–1)	16 – Jackson	10 – Thomas	6 – Mair	Cameron Indoor Stadium (4,701); Durham, NC
January 23, 2025; 8:00 p.m., ACCN	No. 14	at SMU	W 81–46	16–4 (7–1)	24 – Fournier	10 – Donovan	4 – Tied	Moody Coliseum (1,496); University Park, TX
January 26, 2025; 2:00 p.m., ACCNX/ESPN+	No. 14	at No. 18 Georgia Tech	W 55–50	17–4 (8–1)	12 – Tied	8 – Tied	5 – Mair	McCamish Pavilion (4,301); Atlanta, GA
February 3, 2025; 7:00 p.m., ESPN2	No. 10	at No. 14 NC State; Rivalry	L 83–89	17–5 (8–2)	23 – Jackson	10 – Tied	6 – Donovan	Cameron Indoor Stadium (5,500); Durham, NC
February 6, 2025; 7:00 p.m., ACCNX/ESPN+	No. 10	Clemson	W 74–55	18–5 (9–2)	20 – Fournier	5 – Tied	4 – Jackson	Cameron Indoor Stadium (2,471); Durham, NC
February 9, 2025; 2:00 p.m., ACCNX/ESPN+	No. 10	Miami (FL)	W 90–49	19–5 (10–2)	24 – Fournier	8 – Donovan	5 – Mair	Cameron Indoor Stadium (3,003); Durham, NC
February 13, 2025; 6:00 p.m., ACCNX/ESPN+	No. 13	at Wake Forest; Rivalry	W 72–47	20–5 (11–2)	17 – Fournier	6 – Thomas	7 – Jackson	LJVM Coliseum (1,343); Winston-Salem, NC
February 17, 2025; 6:00 p.m., ESPN	No. 11	at No. 1 Notre Dame	L 49–64	20–6 (11–3)	15 – Mair	7 – Donovan	2 – Tied	Purcell Pavilion (9,063); Notre Dame, IN
February 20, 2025; 7:00 p.m., ESPN2	No. 11	Louisville	L 62–70	20–7 (11–4)	17 – Okananwa	7 – Tied	4 – Mair	Cameron Indoor Stadium (2,153); Durham, NC
February 23, 2025; 2:00 p.m., The CW	No. 11	Syracuse	W 80–49	21–7 (12–4)	22 – Fournier	7 – Donovan	5 – Richardson	Cameron Indoor Stadium (3,078); Durham, NC
February 27, 2025; 7:00 p.m., ESPN	No. 16	No. 8 North Carolina; Rivalry	W 68–53	22–7 (13–4)	23 – Richardson	10 – Fournier	6 – Mair	Cameron Indoor Stadium (7,010); Durham, NC
March 2, 2025; 6:00 p.m., ACCN	No. 16	at No. 24 Florida State	W 71–57	23–7 (14–4)	28 – Fournier	10 – Okananwa	5 – Tied	Donald L. Tucker Center (2,829); Tallahassee, FL
ACC Women's Tournament
March 7, 2025; 7:30 p.m., ACCN	(3) No. 11	vs. (6) Louisville; Quarterfinals	W 61–48	24–7	13 – Okananwa	8 – Fournier	4 – Mair	Greensboro Coliseum (7,108); Greensboro, NC
March 8, 2025; 2:30 p.m., ESPN2	(3) No. 11	vs. (2) No. 6 Notre Dame; Semifinals	W 61–56	25–7	14 – Okananwa	7 – Tied	3 – Tied	Greensboro Coliseum (10,894); Greensboro, NC
March 9, 2025; 1:00 p.m., ESPN	(3) No. 11	vs. (1) No. 7 NC State; Final/Rivalry	W 76–62	26–7	22 – Tied	10 – Okananwa	4 – Tied	Greensboro Coliseum (11,823); Greensboro, NC
NCAA Women's Tournament
March 21, 2025*; 8:00 p.m., ESPNU	(2 B2) No. 7	(15 B2) Lehigh; First Round	W 86–25	27–7	15 – Okananwa	8 – Thomas	3 – Donovan	Cameron Indoor Stadium (4,280); Durham, NC
March 23, 2025*; 12:00 p.m., ESPN	(2 B2) No. 7	(10 B2) Oregon; Second Round	W 59–53	28–7	20 – Jackson	6 – Tied	4 – Donovan	Cameron Indoor Stadium (3,461); Durham, NC
March 28, 2025*; 2:30 p.m., ESPN	(2 B2) No. 7	vs. (3 B2) No. 12 North Carolina; Sweet Sixteen/Rivalry	W 47–38	29–7	12 – Okananwa	12 – Okananwa	3 – Jackson	Legacy Arena (11,055); Birmingham, AL
March 30, 2025*; 1:00 p.m., ABC	(2 B2) No. 7	vs. (1 B2) No. 2 South Carolina; Elite Eight	L 50–54	29–8	18 – Fournier	7 – Okananwa	6 – Jackson	Legacy Arena (11,252); Birmingham, AL
*Non-conference game. ^{#}Rankings from AP Poll. (#) Tournament seedings in parentheses. B2=Birmingham2. All times are in Eastern Time.

== Rankings ==
Ranking movements Legend: ██ Increase in ranking ██ Decrease in ranking
	Week																				
Poll	Pre	1	2	3	4	5	6	7	8	9	10	11	12	13	14	15	16	17	18	19	Final
AP	11	16	14	13	8	9	9	14	14	14	16	14	10	10	13	11	16	11	7	7	7
Coaches	11	16	14	13	9	10	10	14	15	14	16	14	10	12	10	11	15	11	7	7	7
