= 2024–25 Maine Black Bears women's basketball team =

American college basketball season

2024–25 Maine Black Bears women's basketball
- Conference: America East Conference
- Record: 15–16 (9–7 America East)
- Head coach: Amy Vachon (8th season)
- Associate head coach: Courtney England
- Assistant coaches: Tom Biskup; Tanesha Sutton
- Home arena: Memorial Gymnasium

2024–25 America East Conference women's basketball standings
	Conf.				Overall
Team	W		L	PCT	W		L	PCT
Albany	14	–	2	.875	26	–	7	.788
Vermont †	13	–	3	.813	21	–	13	.618
Bryant	9	–	7	.563	17	–	15	.531
Maine	9	–	7	.563	15	–	16	.484
NJIT	8	–	8	.500	11	–	19	.367
Binghamton	7	–	9	.438	15	–	15	.500
UMBC	7	–	9	.438	14	–	15	.483
New Hampshire	4	–	12	.250	10	–	20	.333
UMass Lowell	1	–	15	.063	3	–	25	.107
† 2025 AmEast tournament winner

The 2024–25 Maine Black Bears women's basketball team represented the University of Maine during the 2024–25 NCAA Division I women's basketball season. The Black Bears, led by eighth-year head coach Amy Vachon, played their home games at Memorial Gymnasium in Orono, Maine as members of the America East Conference.

== Previous season ==
The Black Bears finished the 2023–24 season 24–10, 14–2 in America East play, to finish as America East regular-season champions. They defeated UMass Lowell, Binghamton and Vermont to win the America East tournament and earn the conference's automatic bid to the NCAA tournament. They would receive the #15 seed in the Portland Regional 3, where they fell to #2 region seed Ohio State in the first round.

== Roster ==
2024–25 Maine Black Bears women's basketball team
Players
Coaches

Pos.	#	Name	Height	Year	Previous school	Hometown
G	0	Sera Hodgson	6 ft 0 in (1.83 m)	Sr	New Hampton School	Rindge, NH
G	1	Olivia Rockwood	5 ft 7 in (1.7 m)	GS	Windsor High School	Windsor, VT
G	2	Emmie Streams	5 ft 4 in (1.63 m)	So	Bangor High School	Veazie, ME
G	3	Izzy Allen	5 ft 11 in (1.8 m)	Fr	Central High School	Corinth, ME
G	4	Jaycie Christopher	5 ft 10 in (1.78 m)	Jr	Skowhegan High School	Skowhegan, ME
G	5	Amiyah Donaldson	5 ft 7 in (1.7 m)	Jr	Western Nebraska Community College	Cleveland, OH
G	6	Asta Blauenfeldt	5 ft 6 in (1.68 m)	Jr	Seattle	Kongens Lyngby, Denmark
F	9	Ona Alarcón	6 ft 3 in (1.91 m)	Fr	Club Basket Almeda	Barcelona, Spain
G	12	Sarah Talon	5 ft 10 in (1.78 m)	Jr	Windham High School	Windham, ME
G/F	13	Caroline Bornemann	5 ft 10 in (1.78 m)	GS	Rungsted Gymnasium	Hørsholm, Denmark
G	15	Paula Gallego	6 ft 0 in (1.83 m)	Sr	Col·legi Pineda	Barcelona, Spain
G	23	Maddie Fitzpatrick	5 ft 11 in (1.8 m)	Fr	Cheverus High School	Cumberland, ME
F	25	Caroline Dotsey	6 ft 2 in (1.88 m)	So	Haverford High School	Havertown, PA
F	33	Adrianna Smith	6 ft 0 in (1.83 m)	Sr	Bishop O'Connell High School	Reston, VA
G	45	Idan Shlush	5 ft 8 in (1.73 m)	Sr	St. John's	Gedera, Israel

Head coach

- Amy Vachon (Maine)

Assistant coach(es)

- Courtney England (Maine)
- Tom Biskup (Maine)
- Tanesha Sutton (Maine)

Legend

- (C) Team captain
- (S) Suspended
- (I) Ineligible
- (W) Walk-on
- Injured
- Current redshirt

Roster
Last update: December 17, 2024

== Schedule and results ==
Date time, TV	Rank^{#}	Opponent^{#}	Result	Record	Site (attendance) city, state
Non-conference regular season
November 4, 2024*; 11:00 a.m., ESPN+		La Salle	W 65–51	1–0	Memorial Gymnasium (1,507); Orono, ME
November 10, 2024*; 11:30 a.m., AmericaEast.TV		Penn	L 52–56	1–1	Memorial Gymnasium (1,088); Orono, ME
November 13, 2024*; 6:35 p.m., ESPN+		at Rhode Island	W 57–53	2–1	Ryan Center (962); Kingston, RI
November 17, 2024*; 12:00 p.m., ESPN+		Harvard	L 41–83	2–2	Memorial Gymnasium (1,144); Orono, ME
November 21, 2024*; 6:00 p.m., ESPN+		at Boston University	L 57–67	2–3	Case Gym (459); Boston, MA
November 24, 2024*; 2:30 p.m., ESPN+		Quinnipiac	L 53–61	2–4	Memorial Gymnasium (1,268); Orono, ME
November 26, 2024*; 7:00 p.m., NEC Front Row		at Stonehill	W 87–75	3–4	Merkert Gymnasium (273); Easton, MA
December 1, 2024*; 2:00 p.m., B1G+		at Indiana	L 53–78	3–5	Simon Skjodt Assembly Hall (10,477); Bloomington, IN
December 4, 2024*; 7:00 p.m., B1G+		at Purdue	L 51–60	3–6	Mackey Arena (3,413); West Lafayette, IN
December 9, 2024*; 7:00 p.m., ESPN+		at Saint Joseph's	L 48–74	3–7	Hagan Arena (884); Philadelphia, PA
December 21, 2024*; 2:00 p.m., ESPN+		Bates	W 96–39	4–7	Memorial Gymnasium (1,099); Orono, ME
December 28, 2024*; 4:00 p.m., NEC Front Row		at Fairleigh Dickinson; FDU Christmas Classic	L 48–66	4–8	Bogota Savings Bank Center (377); Hackensack, NJ
December 29, 2024*; 1:00 p.m.		vs. Coppin State; FDU Christmas Classic	W 66–55	5–8	Bogota Savings Bank Center (185); Hackensack, NJ
America East regular season
January 2, 2025; 6:00 p.m., ESPN+		at UMass Lowell	W 54–39	6–8 (1–0)	Costello Athletic Center (188); Lowell, MA
January 4, 2025; 1:00 p.m., ESPN+		Bryant	W 87–64	7–8 (2–0)	Memorial Gymnasium (1,196); Orono, ME
January 9, 2025; 6:07 p.m., ESPN+		at Binghamton	L 59–69	7–9 (2–1)	Dr. Bai Lee Court (1,011); Vestal, NY
January 11, 2025; 2:00 p.m., ESPN+		at Albany	L 55–60	7–10 (2–2)	Broadview Center (1,282); Albany, NY
January 16, 2025; 6:00 p.m., ESPN+		NJIT	W 71–58	8–10 (3–2)	Memorial Gymnasium (880); Orono, ME
January 18, 2025; 1:00 p.m., ESPN+		UMBC	W 61–47	9–10 (4–2)	Memorial Gymnasium (1,214); Orono, ME
January 23, 2025; 6:00 p.m., ESPN+		UMass Lowell	W 74–44	10–10 (5–2)	Memorial Gymnasium (978); Orono, ME
January 30, 2025; 6:00 p.m., ESPN+		at New Hampshire	W 65–54	11–10 (6–2)	Lundholm Gym (482); Durham, NH
February 1, 2025; 1:00 p.m., ESPN+		Vermont	W 45–39	12–10 (7–2)	Memorial Gymnasium (1,181); Orono, ME
February 6, 2025; 6:00 p.m., ESPN+		at NJIT	L 56–61	12–11 (7–3)	Wellness and Events Center (177); Newark, NJ
February 8, 2025; 2:00 p.m., ESPN+		at UMBC	L 53–71	12–12 (7–4)	Chesapeake Employers Insurance Arena (476); Catonsville, MD
February 15, 2025; 4:00 p.m., ESPN+		at Vermont	L 34–65	12–13 (7–5)	Patrick Gym (1,349); Burlington, VT
February 20, 2025; 6:00 p.m., ESPN+		Albany	L 40–56	12–14 (7–6)	Memorial Gymnasium (1,123); Orono, ME
February 22, 2025; 1:00 p.m., ESPN+		Binghamton	W 54–53	13–14 (8–6)	Memorial Gymnasium (1,095); Orono, ME
February 27, 2025; 6:00 p.m., ESPN+		New Hampshire	W 62–48	14–14 (9–6)	Memorial Gymnasium (1,275); Orono, ME
March 1, 2025; 2:00 p.m., ESPN+		at Bryant	L 57–68	14–15 (9–7)	Chace Athletic Center (375); Smithfield, RI
America East tournament
March 6, 2025; 6:00 pm, ESPN+	(4)	(5) NJIT; Quarterfinals	W 65–51	15–15	Memorial Gymnasium (837); Orono, ME
March 10, 2025; 6:30 pm, ESPN+	(4)	(1) Albany; Semifinals	L 41–49	15–16	Broadview Center (1,156); Albany, NY
*Non-conference game. ^{#}Rankings from AP poll. (#) Tournament seedings in parentheses. All times are in Eastern.
