= 2024–25 Pittsburgh Panthers women's basketball team =

Intercollegiate basketball season

2024–25 Pittsburgh Panthers women's basketball
- Conference: Atlantic Coast Conference
- Record: 13–18 (5–13 ACC)
- Head coach: Tory Verdi (2nd season)
- Assistant coaches: Candice Finley (2nd season); John Marcum (1st season); Devan Newman (1st season); Anthony Brammer (2nd season)
- Home arena: Petersen Events Center

2024–25 ACC women's basketball standings
	Conf.				Overall
Team	W		L	PCT	W		L	PCT
No. 9 NC State	16	–	2	.889	28	–	7	.800
No. 8 Notre Dame	16	–	2	.889	28	–	6	.824
No. 7 Duke †	14	–	4	.778	29	–	8	.784
No. 22 Florida State	13	–	5	.722	24	–	9	.727
No. 12 North Carolina	13	–	5	.722	29	–	8	.784
Louisville	13	–	5	.722	22	–	11	.667
California	12	–	6	.667	25	–	9	.735
Virginia Tech	9	–	9	.500	19	–	13	.594
Georgia Tech	9	–	9	.500	22	–	11	.667
Virginia	8	–	10	.444	17	–	15	.531
Stanford	8	–	10	.444	16	–	15	.516
Boston College	6	–	12	.333	16	–	18	.471
Syracuse	6	–	12	.333	12	–	18	.400
Clemson	6	–	12	.333	14	–	17	.452
Pittsburgh	5	–	13	.278	13	–	19	.406
Miami (FL)	4	–	14	.222	14	–	15	.483
Wake Forest	2	–	16	.111	9	–	20	.310
SMU	2	–	16	.111	10	–	20	.333
† 2025 ACC tournament winner Rankings from AP Poll

The 2024–25 Pittsburgh Panthers women's basketball team represented the University of Pittsburgh during the 2024–25 NCAA Division I women's basketball season. The Panthers were led by second-year head coach Tory Verdi, and played their home games at the Petersen Events Center in Pittsburgh, Pennsylvania as a member of the Atlantic Coast Conference (ACC).

The Panthers started the season with two wins against non-Power 4 teams before facing West Virginia in a rivalry game. The Mountaineers were ranked fifteenth in the nation at the time, and defeated the Pathers 82–54. The Panthers rebounded by winning three straight games. The Panthers then participated in the Paradise Jam, where they lost three straight games. The closest game of the event was their opener against Kansas, which they lost by six points. Upon returning to Pittsuburgh, the Panthers lost another rivalry game to Duquesne by four points. They defeated Saint Peter's before losing their ACC opener against Miami (FL). They followed that with their biggest win of the season, a 94–34 defeat of New Hampshire. They defeated Utah Tech before losing three straight ACC games. Two of the games were against ranked opponents, number thirteen Georgia Tech and number fourteen Duke. The Panthers broke the losing streak with a 72–59 defeat of SMU. However, they could not build on that momentum, losing their next five games, of which three were against ranked opponents. They defeated Boston College and completed the series sweep of SMU before losing three more ACC games. They finished the season 2–1 with defeats of Clemson and Wake Forest but losing to Syracuse.

The Panthers finished the season 13–19 overall and 5–13 in ACC play to finish in fifteenth place. As the fifteenth seed in the ACC tournament, they lost their first-round matchup with tenth-seeded Virginia. They were not invited to the NCAA tournament or the WBIT.

== Previous season ==
The Panthers started the 2023–24 season by winning only one of their first five games. However, their fortunes improved over the remainder of their non-conference schedule, as they won five of their last eight non-conference games. They finished the non-conference portion of the season with a 6–7 record. They lost their first six conference games before winning against Virginia. The Panthers lost another six games before defeating Clemson for their second conference win of the season. The team lost their last four regular-season games. The Panthers finished the season 8–24 overall and 2–16 in ACC play to finish in a tie for fourteenth place. As the fifteenth seed in the ACC tournament, they lost their first-round matchup with Georgia Tech. They were not invited to the NCAA tournament or the WBIT.

== Off-season ==
=== Departures ===
Departures
Name	Number	Pos.	Height	Year	Hometown	Reason for departure
Gabby Hutcherson	0	F	6' 2"	Senior	Westerville, OH	Transferred to Duquesne
Liatu King	2	F	6' 0"	Senior	Washington, D.C.	Transferred to Notre Dame
Jasmine Timmerson	3	G	5' 7"	Freshman	Wexford, PA	Transferred to Davidson
Jala Jordan	14	F	6' 2"	Graduate student	Philadelphia, PA	Graduated
Rapuluchi Ayodele	15	F	6' 1"	Junior	Móstoles, Spain	Transferred to Tennessee
Ioanna Chatzileonti	18	F	6' 2"	Senior	Athens, Greece	Graduated

=== Incoming transfers ===
Incoming transfers
Name	Number	Pos.	Height	Year	Hometown	Previous school
Brooklynn Miles	0	G	5' 5"	Senior	Frankfort, KY	Kentucky
Amiya Jenkins	2	G	5' 10"	Junior	Lexington, KY	Kentucky
Makayla Elmore	3	F	6' 3"	Senior	Fostoria, OH	Clemson
Khadija Faye	15	F	6' 4"	Graduate student	Dakar, Senegal	Texas
Mikayla Johnson	23	G	6' 1"	(redshirt) Sophomore	Anchorage, AK	Colorado

=== Recruiting class ===
College recruiting
Name	Hometown	School	Height	Weight	Commit date
Audrey Biggs; G	Catlettsburg, KY	Boyd County	6 ft 0 in (1.83 m)	N/A	Jun 27, 2023
Audrey Biggs; G	Recruit ratings: ESPN: (NR)				
Kiara Williams; F	Palm Bay, FL	Palm Bay	6 ft 0 in (1.83 m)	N/A	Sep 19, 2023
Kiara Williams; F	Recruit ratings: ESPN: (NR)				
Overall recruit ranking:
Note: In many cases, Scout, Rivals, 247Sports, On3, and ESPN may conflict in their listings of height and weight.; In these cases, the average was taken. ESPN grades are on a 100-point scale.; Sources:

== Roster ==
2024–25 Pittsburgh Panthers women's basketball team
Players
Coaches

Pos.	#	Name	Height	Year	Previous school	Hometown
G	0	Brooklynn Miles	5 ft 5 in (1.65 m)	Sr	Franklin County; Kentucky	Frankfort, KY
G	1	Aaryn Battle	5 ft 10 in (1.78 m)	So	Camden Catholic	Sewell, NJ
G	2	Amiya Jenkins	5 ft 10 in (1.78 m)	Jr	Anderson County; Kentucky	Lexington, KY
F	3	Makayla Elmore	6 ft 3 in (1.91 m)	Sr	Hopewell-Loudon; Clemson	Fostoria, OH
F	5	Kiara Williams	6 ft 0 in (1.83 m)	Fr	Palm Bay	Palm Bay, FL
G	10	Bella Perkins	5 ft 9 in (1.75 m)	Sr	Paul VI HS; USC	Chantilly, VA
G	11	Marley Washenitz	5 ft 7 in (1.7 m)	Jr	Fairmont	Fairmont, WV
F	13	Lauren Rust	6 ft 0 in (1.83 m)	So	The Webb School	Victoria, BC
G	14	Raeven Boswell	5 ft 11 in (1.8 m)	Jr	Lake Travis; Georgia Tech	Austin, TX
F	15	Khadija Faye	6 ft 4 in (1.93 m)	GS	Father Lopez; Texas	Dakar, Senegal
G	20	Aislin Malcolm	5 ft 10 in (1.78 m)	Jr	Chartiers Valley	Carnegie, PA
G	22	Audrey Biggs	6 ft 0 in (1.83 m)	Fr	Boyd County	Catlettsburg, KY
G	23	Mikayla Johnson	6 ft 1 in (1.85 m)	RS So	Bartlett; Colorado	Anchorage, AK

Head coach

- Tory Verdi (Keene State)

Assistant coach(es)

- Candice Finley (Eastern Kentucky)
- John Marcum (Oklahoma Baptist)
- Devan Newman (Louisville)
- Anthony Brammer (Old Dominion)

Legend

- (C) Team captain
- (S) Suspended
- (I) Ineligible
- (W) Walk-on
- Injured
- Current redshirt

Roster
Last update: August 26, 2024

== Schedule ==
Date time, TV	Rank^{#}	Opponent^{#}	Result	Record	High points	High rebounds	High assists	Site (attendance) city, state
Exhibition
October 30, 2024*; 6:00 p.m.		Pitt–Johnstown	W 106–37	–	26 – Jenkins	– –	8 – Miles	Petersen Events Center; Pittsburgh, PA
Regular season
November 5, 2024*; 6:00 p.m., ACCNX		Canisius	W 78–36	1–0	25 – Faye	12 – Faye	3 – 2 tied	Petersen Events Center (306); Pittsburgh, PA
November 9, 2024*; 1:00 p.m., ACCNX		Bucknell	W 64–61	2–0	19 – Jenkins	7 – Faye	4 – 2 tied	Petersen Events Center (347); Pittsburgh, PA
November 12, 2024*; 7:00 p.m., ESPN+		at No. 15 West Virginia; Backyard Brawl	L 54–82	2–1	14 – Faye	12 – Faye	2 – 2 tied	WVU Coliseum (3,614); Morgantown, WV
November 17, 2024*; 2:00 p.m., ESPN+		at Binghamton	W 61–56	3–1	15 – Battle	12 – Johnson	3 – Battle	Binghamton University Events Center (1,207); Vestal, NY
November 20, 2024*; 11:00 a.m., ACCNX		Delaware State	W 80–45	4–1	21 – Faye	14 – Faye	9 – Miles	Petersen Events Center (2,622); Pittsburgh, PA
November 23, 2024*; 1:00 p.m., ACCNX		Robert Morris	W 64–51	5–1	25 – Faye	15 – Faye	5 – Malcolm	Petersen Events Center (219); Pittsburgh, PA
November 28, 2024*; 1:30 p.m., ESPN+		vs. Kansas; Paradise Jam	L 53–59	5–2	14 – Johnson	7 – 2 tied	2 – 3 tied	Sports and Fitness Center; Saint Thomas, USVI
November 29, 2024*; 1:30 p.m., ESPN+		vs. Auburn; Paradise Jam	L 50–82	5–3	10 – Elmore	6 – Elmore	1 – 5 tied	Sports and Fitness Center; Saint Thomas, USVI
November 30, 2024*; 2:30 p.m., ESPN+		vs. Northern Iowa; Paradise Jam	L 74–90	5–4	26 – Perkins	8 – Elmore	4 – Biggs	Sports and Fitness Center; Saint Thomas, USVI
December 4, 2024*; 6:00 p.m., ACCNX		Duquesne; City Game	L 69–73	5–5	23 – Faye	15 – Faye	5 – Battle	Petersen Events Center (551); Pittsburgh, PA
December 8, 2024*; 1:00 p.m., ACCNX		Saint Peter's	W 59–51	6–5	24 – Faye	14 – Elmore	4 – Miles	Petersen Events Center (128); Pittsburgh, PA
December 15, 2024; 12:00 p.m., ACCN		Miami (FL)	L 55–62	6–6 (0–1)	21 – Faye	14 – Faye	4 – Elmore	Petersen Events Center (340); Pittsburgh, PA
December 19, 2024*; 2:30 p.m., ACCNX		New Hampshire	W 94–34	7–6	21 – Johnson	9 – Faye	8 – Miles	Petersen Events Center (157); Pittsburgh, PA
December 21, 2024*; 3:00 p.m., ESPN+		at Utah Tech	W 61–52	8–6	19 – Faye	15 – Elmore	4 – Miles	Burns Arena (358); St. George, UT
December 29, 2024; 2:00 p.m., ACCNX		at No. 13 Georgia Tech	L 61–100	8–7 (0–2)	22 – Faye	6 – Faye	5 – Miles	McCamish Pavilion (2,151); Atlanta, GA
January 5, 2025; 12:00 p.m., ACCN		at No. 14 Duke	L 31–69	8–8 (0–3)	17 – Faye	5 – Elmore	3 – Miles	Cameron Indoor Stadium (2,550); Durham, NC
January 9, 2025; 6:00 p.m., ACCNX		Louisville	L 55–65	8–9 (0–4)	16 – Faye	9 – Elmore	4 – Battle	Petersen Events Center (357); Pittsburgh, PA
January 12, 2025; 1:00 p.m., ACCNX		SMU	W 72–59	9–9 (1–4)	22 – Johnson	13 – Elmore	8 – Miles	Petersen Events Center (290); Pittsburgh, PA
January 16, 2025; 7:00 p.m., ACCNX		at No. 21 NC State	L 67–83	9–10 (1–5)	28 – Faye	6 – 2 tied	3 – 2 tied	Reynolds Coliseum (5,500); Raleigh, NC
January 19, 2025; 2:00 p.m., ACCN		No. 14 North Carolina	L 58–75	9–11 (1–6)	18 – Johnson	10 – 2 tied	7 – Washenitz	Petersen Events Center (800); Pittsburgh, PA
January 23, 2025; 6:00 p.m., ACCNX		Virginia Tech	L 57–84	9–12 (1–7)	11 – 2 tied	7 – Elmore	5 – Washenitz	Petersen Events Center (196); Pittsburgh, PA
January 30, 2025; 10:00 p.m., ACCNX		at Stanford	L 46–58	9–13 (1–8)	21 – Faye	15 – Faye	3 – 2 tied	Maples Pavilion (2,807); Stanford, CA
February 2, 2025; 5:00 p.m., ACCNX		at No. 19 California	L 53–84	9–14 (1–9)	20 – Washenitz	6 – Faye	5 – Washenitz	Haas Pavilion (2,733); Berkeley, CA
February 6, 2025; 6:00 p.m., ACCNX		Boston College	W 79–66	10–14 (2–9)	19 – Faye	13 – Elmore	5 – Elmore	Petersen Events Center (292); Pittsburgh, PA
February 9, 2025; 3:00 p.m., ACCNX		at SMU	W 58–57	11–14 (3–9)	22 – Faye	17 – Faye	5 – Miles	Moody Coliseum (1,623); University Park, TX
February 13, 2025; 8:00 p.m., ACCN		No. 2 Notre Dame	L 57–88	11–15 (3–10)	23 – Faye	16 – Faye	3 – 3 tied	Petersen Events Center (1,774); Pittsburgh, PA
February 16, 2025; 2:00 p.m., ACCNX		Virginia	L 67–80	11–16 (3–11)	27 – Johnson	13 – Faye	5 – 2 tied	Petersen Events Center (1,041); Pittsburgh, PA
February 20, 2025; 6:00 p.m., ACCNX		at Florida State	L 55–69	11–17 (3–12)	21 – Faye	14 – Faye	3 – 2 tied	Donald L. Tucker Center (1,818); Tallahassee, FL
February 23, 2025; 1:00 p.m., ACCNX		Clemson	W 72–59	12–17 (4–12)	21 – Faye	10 – Faye	4 – Washenitz	Petersen Events Center (700); Pittsburgh, PA
February 27, 2025; 7:00 p.m., ACCNX		at Syracuse	L 65–83	12–18 (4–13)	25 – Faye	10 – Faye	6 – Washenitz	JMA Wireless Dome (2,667); Syracuse, NY
March 2, 2025; 2:00 p.m., ACCNX		at Wake Forest	W 79–63	13–18 (5–13)	31 – Faye	9 – Faye	6 – Miles	LJVM Coliseum (1,393); Winston-Salem, NC
ACC women's tournament
March 5, 2025*; 3:30 p.m., ACCN	(15)	vs. (10) Virginia; First round	L 50–64	13–19	15 – Faye	11 – Faye	4 – Miles	Greensboro Coliseum (6,932); Greensboro, NC
*Non-conference game. ^{#}Rankings from AP poll. (#) Tournament seedings in parentheses. All times are in Eastern.
