= 2025 America East women's basketball tournament =

American college basketball postseason tournament

- Classification: Division I
- Season: 2024–25
- Teams: 8
- Site: Campus sites
- Champions: Vermont (8th title)
- Winning coach: Alisa Kresge (2nd title)
- MVP: Nikola Priede (Vermont)
- Television: ESPN+ ESPNU
- America East women's basketball tournaments

2024–25 America East Conference women's basketball standings
| | Conf. | | | | Overall |
| Team | W | | L | PCT | W | | L | PCT |
|---|---|---|---|---|---|---|---|---|
| Albany | 14 | – | 2 | .875 | 26 | – | 6 | .813 |
| Vermont † | 13 | – | 3 | .813 | 21 | – | 12 | .636 |
| Bryant | 9 | – | 7 | .563 | 17 | – | 14 | .548 |
| Maine | 9 | – | 7 | .563 | 15 | – | 16 | .484 |
| NJIT | 8 | – | 8 | .500 | 11 | – | 19 | .367 |
| Binghamton | 7 | – | 9 | .438 | 15 | – | 15 | .500 |
| UMBC | 7 | – | 9 | .438 | 14 | – | 15 | .483 |
| New Hampshire | 4 | – | 12 | .250 | 10 | – | 20 | .333 |
| UMass Lowell | 1 | – | 15 | .063 | 3 | – | 25 | .107 |
† 2025 AmEast tournament winner As of March 14, 2025

The 2025 America East Women's Basketball Conference tournament was the postseason women's basketball tournament for the America East Conference. It was held March 6–14, 2025 at the campus sites of the higher seeds. Vermont defeated Albany 62–55 in the Final. Vermont will receive the conference's automatic bid to the 2025 NCAA Tournament. The tournament will be sponsored by Jersey Mike's Subs and will be officially known as the 2025 Jersey Mike's America East Women's Basketball Playoffs.

== Seeds ==
Eight of the nine America East teams will qualify for the tournament. The teams will be seeded by record in conference, with a tiebreaker system to seed teams with identical conference records.

| Seed | School | AEC Record | Tiebreaker |
|---|---|---|---|
| 1 | Albany | 14–2 | |
| 2 | Vermont | 13–3 | |
| 3 | Bryant | 9–7 | Better conference road record |
| 4 | Maine | 9–7 | |
| 5 | NJIT | 8–8 | |
| 6 | Binghamton | 7–9 | 2–0 against UMBC |
| 7 | UMBC | 7–9 | 0–2 against Binghamton |
| 8 | New Hampshire | 4–12 | |
| DNQ | UMass Lowell | 1–15 | |

== Schedule ==
| Game | Time* | Matchup^{#} | Score | Television |
Quarterfinals – Thursday, March 6, 2025
| 1 | 6:30 pm | No. 8 New Hampshire at No. 1 Albany | 44–66 | ESPN+ |
| 2 | 5:00 pm | No. 7 UMBC at No. 2 Vermont | 39–70 | ESPN+ |
| 3 | 6:00 pm | No. 6 Binghamton at No. 3 Bryant | 63–66 | ESPN+ |
| 4 | 6:00 pm | No. 5 NJIT at No. 4 Maine | 51–65 | ESPN+ |
Semifinals – Monday, March 10, 2025
| 5 | TBA | No. 4 Maine at No. 1 Albany | 41–49 | ESPN+ |
| 6 | TBA | No. 3 Bryant at No. 2 Vermont | 45–62 | ESPN+ |
Championship – Friday, March 14, 2025
| 7 | 5:00 pm | No. 2 Vermont at No. 1 Albany | 62–55 | ESPNU |
*Game times in EST for the quarter finals and EDT for the semifinals and championship. #-Rankings denote tournament seeding.

== Bracket ==
Quarterfinals; Thursday, March 6, 2025; ESPN+
1 | Albany | 66
8 | New Hampshire | 44
4 | Maine | 65
5 | NJIT | 51
(Pairings are reseeded after the first round)
3 | Bryant | 66
6 | Binghamton | 63
2 | Vermont | 70
7 | UMBC | 39

Semifinals; Monday, March 10, 2025; ESPN+
1 | Albany | 49
4 | Maine | 41
3 | Bryant | 45
2 | Vermont | 62

Championship; Friday, March 14, 2025; ESPNU
1 | Albany | 55
2 | Vermont | 62

== See also ==
- 2025 America East men's basketball tournament
