= 2024–25 UMBC Retrievers women's basketball team =

American college basketball season

2024–25 UMBC Retrievers women's basketball
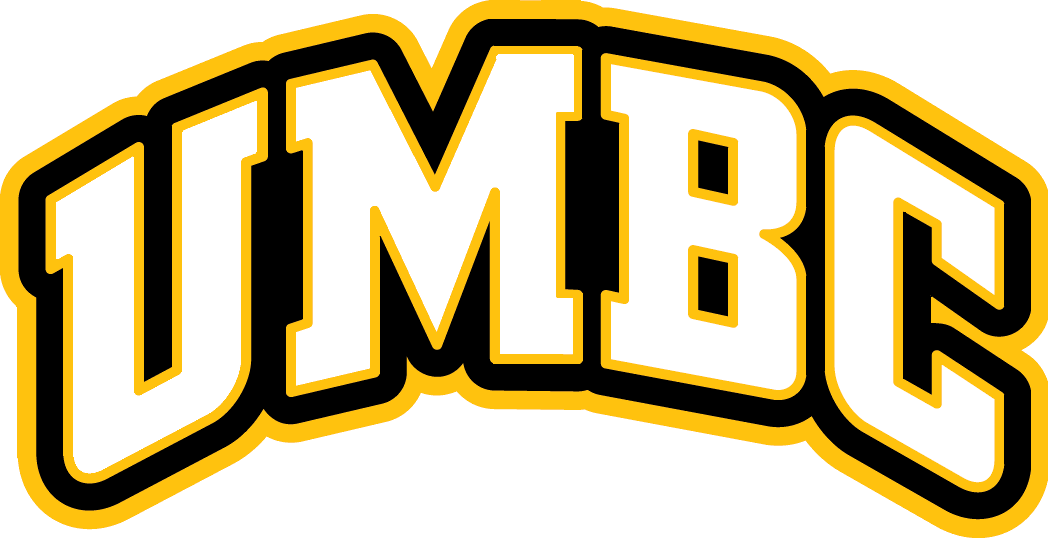
- Conference: America East Conference
- Record: 14–15 (7–9 America East)
- Head coach: Candice Hill (1st season)
- Assistant coaches: Delmar "Buck" Carey; Reggie Daniels; Maggie Tien
- Home arena: Chesapeake Employers Insurance Arena

2024–25 America East Conference women's basketball standings
	Conf.				Overall
Team	W		L	PCT	W		L	PCT
Albany	14	–	2	.875	26	–	7	.788
Vermont †	13	–	3	.813	21	–	13	.618
Bryant	9	–	7	.563	17	–	15	.531
Maine	9	–	7	.563	15	–	16	.484
NJIT	8	–	8	.500	11	–	19	.367
Binghamton	7	–	9	.438	15	–	15	.500
UMBC	7	–	9	.438	14	–	15	.483
New Hampshire	4	–	12	.250	10	–	20	.333
UMass Lowell	1	–	15	.063	3	–	25	.107
† 2025 AmEast tournament winner

The 2024–25 UMBC Retrievers women's basketball team represented the University of Maryland, Baltimore County during the 2024–25 NCAA Division I women's basketball season. The Retrievers, led by first-year head coach Candice Hill, played their home games at the Chesapeake Employers Insurance Arena in Catonsville, Maryland as members of the America East Conference.

== Previous season ==
The Retrievers finished the 2023–24 season 10–19, 6–10 in America East play, to finish in sixth place. They were defeated by Vermont in the quarterfinals of the America East tournament.

On March 11, 2024, the school announced that they would be parting ways with head coach Johnetta Hayes, who had led the team for four years. On April 15, the school announced the hiring of Baltimore native and St. John's associate head coach and recruiting coordinator Candice Hill as the team's new head coach.

== Roster ==
2024–25 UMBC Retrievers women's basketball team
Players
Coaches

Pos.	#	Name	Height	Year	Previous school	Hometown
G	0	Yasmin Ott	5 ft 7 in (1.7 m)	GS	Georgetown	Little Rock, AR
G	1	Tiara Bellamy	5 ft 7 in (1.7 m)	RS So	Saint Peter's	Plainfield, NJ
G	2	Layla Marshall	5 ft 8 in (1.73 m)	Fr	Westfield Preparatory	Detroit, MI
G	3	Jaliena Sanchez	5 ft 5 in (1.65 m)	GS	UMass Lowell	Springfield, MA
G	4	Riley Donahue	5 ft 10 in (1.78 m)	GS	Auburn	Atlanta, GA
G/F	5	Jordon Lewis	5 ft 10 in (1.78 m)	GS	La Salle	Houston, TX
F	10	Alaina Williams	6 ft 1 in (1.85 m)	So	Idaho State	Apollo Beach, FL
G	12	Lauren Thompson	5 ft 6 in (1.68 m)	Fr	Sacred Heart Academy	Branford, CT
G	13	Kenya Ramsey	6 ft 0 in (1.83 m)	Fr	Kempsville High School	Virginia Beach, VA
G	15	Carmen Yánez	5 ft 6 in (1.68 m)	Jr	Institut Martí Dot	Las Palmas, Canary Islands
F	21	Talia Davis	6 ft 0 in (1.83 m)	GS	North Carolina A&T	Dedham, MA
F	22	Jaden Walker	5 ft 10 in (1.78 m)	GS	Saint Joseph's	New Freedom, PA
C	33	Laura Lacambra	6 ft 2 in (1.88 m)	Jr	Escola Sant Gabriel de Viladecans	Viladecans, Spain

Head coach

- Candice Hill (Loyola (MD))

Assistant coach(es)

- Delmar "Buck" Carey (Bowie State)
- Reggie Daniels (Hood)
- Maggie Tien (Washington Adventist)

Legend

- (C) Team captain
- (S) Suspended
- (I) Ineligible
- (W) Walk-on
- Injured
- Current redshirt

Roster
Last update: December 10, 2024

== Schedule and results ==
Date time, TV	Rank^{#}	Opponent^{#}	Result	Record	Site (attendance) city, state
Non-conference regular season
November 4, 2024*; 7:00 p.m., ESPN+		No. 18 Maryland	L 32–74	0–1	Chesapeake Employers Insurance Arena (2,306); Catonsville, MD
November 6, 2024*; 6:30 p.m., ESPN+		Notre Dame (MD)	W 79–24	1–1	Chesapeake Employers Insurance Arena (273); Catonsville, MD
November 10, 2024*; 5:00 p.m., ESPN+		at Loyola (MD)	L 46–54	1–2	Reitz Arena (658); Baltimore, MD
November 17, 2024*; 2:00 p.m., ESPN+		Morgan State	W 81–72	2–2	Chesapeake Employers Insurance Arena (687); Catonsville, MD
November 20, 2024*; 6:30 p.m., ESPN+		American	W 50–45	3–2	Chesapeake Employers Insurance Arena (273); Catonsville, MD
November 24, 2024*; 4:00 p.m., ESPN+		Manhattan	L 50–60	3–3	Chesapeake Employers Insurance Arena (452); Catonsville, MD
November 29, 2024*; 1:00 p.m., ESPN+		at Colgate; Colgate Thanksgiving Tournament semifinals	L 49–75	3–4	Cotterell Court (471); Hamilton, NY
November 30, 2024*; 1:00 p.m., YouTube		vs. Iona; Colgate Thanksgiving Tournament third-place game	W 62–40	4–4	Cotterell Court; Hamilton, NY
December 4, 2024*; 11:00 a.m., Monumental/FloHoops		at Towson	W 65–60	5–4	TU Arena (3,590); Towson, MD
December 8, 2024*; 2:00 p.m., NEC Front Row		at Saint Francis	W 61–45	6–4	DeGol Arena (405); Loretto, PA
December 20, 2024*; 2:00 p.m., ESPN+		at George Mason	L 53–75	6–5	EagleBank Arena (651); Fairfax, VA
December 29, 2024*; 1:00 p.m., ESPN+		Bryn Athyn	W 101–49	7–5	Chesapeake Employers Insurance Arena (394); Catonsville, MD
America East regular season
January 4, 2025; 2:00 p.m., ESPN+		Binghamton	L 50–60	7–6 (0–1)	Chesapeake Employers Insurance Arena (355); Catonsville, MD
January 9, 2025; 6:30 p.m., ESPN+		NJIT	L 55–83	7–7 (0–2)	Chesapeake Employers Insurance Arena (317); Catonsville, MD
January 16, 2025; 11:00 a.m., ESPN+		at New Hampshire	L 39–56	7–8 (0–3)	Lundholm Gym (223); Durham, NH
January 18, 2025; 1:00 p.m., ESPN+		at Maine	L 47–61	7–9 (0–4)	Memorial Gymnasium (1,214); Orono, ME
January 23, 2025; 11:00 a.m., ESPN+		Albany	W 71–59	8–9 (1–4)	Chesapeake Employers Insurance Arena (3,108); Catonsville, MD
January 25, 2025; 2:00 p.m., ESPN+		Vermont	L 44–67	8–10 (1–5)	Chesapeake Employers Insurance Arena (455); Catonsville, MD
January 30, 2025; 6:00 p.m., ESPN+		at Bryant	W 49–46	9–10 (2–5)	Chace Athletic Center (185); Smithfield, RI
February 1, 2025; 1:00 p.m., ESPN+		at UMass Lowell	L 46–48	10–10 (3–5)	Costello Athletic Center (273); Lowell, MA
February 6, 2025; 6:30 p.m., ESPN+		New Hampshire	W 51–32	11–10 (4–5)	Chesapeake Employers Insurance Arena (321); Catonsville, MD
February 8, 2025; 2:00 p.m., ESPN+		Maine	W 71–53	12–10 (5–5)	Chesapeake Employers Insurance Arena (476); Catonsville, MD
February 13, 2025; 6:07 p.m., ESPN+		at Binghamton	L 48–58	12–11 (5–6)	Dr. Bai Lee Court (1,103); Vestal, NY
February 15, 2025; 4:00 p.m., ESPN+		Bryant	W 75–67	13–11 (6–6)	Chesapeake Employers Insurance Arena (581); Catonsville, MD
February 20, 2025; 6:00 p.m., ESPN+		UMass Lowell	W 53–51	14–11 (7–6)	Chesapeake Employers Insurance Arena (351); Catonsville, MD
February 22, 2025; 1:00 p.m., ESPN+		at NJIT	L 65–83	14–12 (7–7)	Wellness and Events Center (223); Newark, NJ
February 27, 2025; 6:30 p.m., ESPN+		at Albany	L 60–68	14–13 (7–8)	Broadview Center (1,147); Albany, NY
March 1, 2025; 2:00 p.m., ESPN+		at Vermont	L 59–79	14–14 (7–9)	Patrick Gym (1,297); Burlington, VT
America East tournament
March 6, 2025; 5:00 pm, ESPN+	(7)	at (2) Vermont; Quarterfinals	L 39–70	14–15	Patrick Gym (744); Burlington, VT
*Non-conference game. ^{#}Rankings from AP poll. (#) Tournament seedings in parentheses. All times are in Eastern.
