= 2024–25 Bryant Bulldogs women's basketball team =

American college basketball season

2024–25 Bryant Bulldogs women's basketball
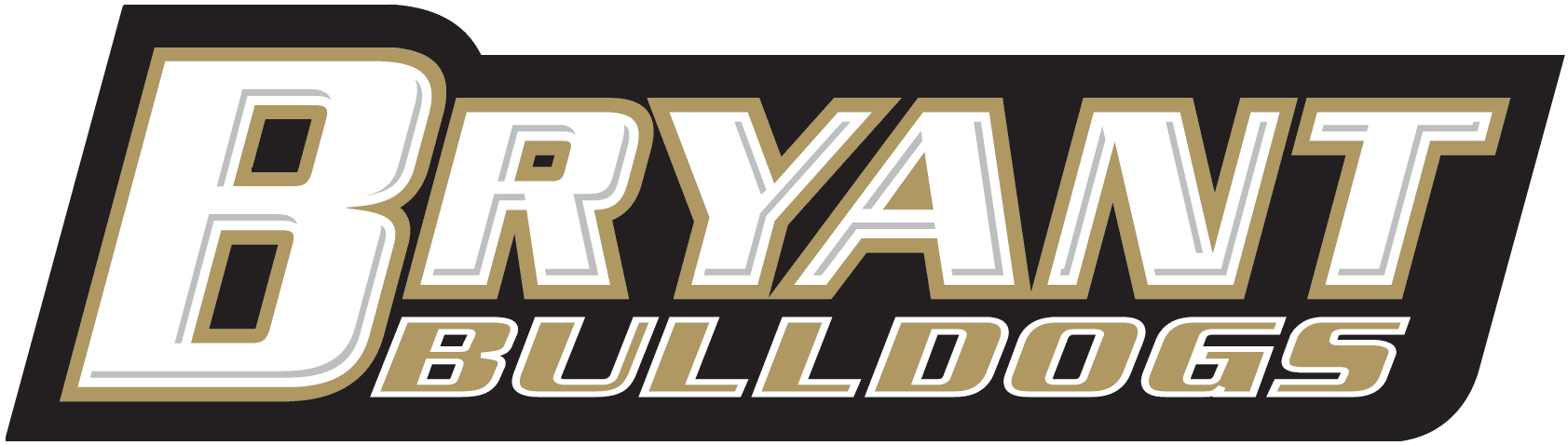

WNIT, First Round
- Conference: America East Conference
- Record: 17–15 (9–7 America East)
- Head coach: Lynne-Ann Kokoski (2nd season)
- Associate head coach: Cristina Centeno
- Assistant coaches: Sarah Assante; Gadson Lefft; Reilly Howard
- Home arena: Chace Athletic Center

2024–25 America East Conference women's basketball standings
	Conf.				Overall
Team	W		L	PCT	W		L	PCT
Albany	14	–	2	.875	26	–	7	.788
Vermont †	13	–	3	.813	21	–	13	.618
Bryant	9	–	7	.563	17	–	15	.531
Maine	9	–	7	.563	15	–	16	.484
NJIT	8	–	8	.500	11	–	19	.367
Binghamton	7	–	9	.438	15	–	15	.500
UMBC	7	–	9	.438	14	–	15	.483
New Hampshire	4	–	12	.250	10	–	20	.333
UMass Lowell	1	–	15	.063	3	–	25	.107
† 2025 AmEast tournament winner

The 2024–25 Bryant Bulldogs women's basketball team represented Bryant University during the 2024–25 NCAA Division I women's basketball season. The Bulldogs, led by second-year head coach Lynne-Ann Kokoski, played their home games at the Chace Athletic Center in Smithfield, Rhode Island as members of the America East Conference.

== Previous season ==
The Bulldogs finished the 2023–24 season 15–15, 8–8 in America East play, to finish in a tie for fourth place. They were defeated by Binghamton in the quarterfinals of the America East tournament.

== Roster ==
2024–25 Bryant Bulldogs women's basketball team
Players
Coaches

Pos.	#	Name	Height	Year	Previous school	Hometown
F	1	Ali Brigham	6 ft 4 in (1.93 m)	GS	Penn State	Franklin, MA
G	2	Mia Mancini	5 ft 6 in (1.68 m)	So	Wheeler School	Mansfield, MA
G	3	Jada Leonard	5 ft 8 in (1.73 m)	Jr	Saint Peter's	The Bronx, NY
G	5	Mimi Rubino	5 ft 7 in (1.7 m)	GS	Fairfield	Pequannock, NJ
F	8	Jana Aubà	6 ft 0 in (1.83 m)	Fr	UeMataró	Mataró, Spain
G/F	10	Gabrielle Sweeney	6 ft 1 in (1.85 m)	Fr	John Jay Senior High School	Hopewell Junction, NY
G	11	Olivia Fernandez	5 ft 9 in (1.75 m)	Fr	Harrison High School	Harrison, NY
C	13	Jessica Berens	6 ft 4 in (1.93 m)	RS Jr	Coginchaug Regional High School	Durham, CT
F	14	Silvia Gonzalez	6 ft 2 in (1.88 m)	So	INS Joaquim Blume	Sant Adrià de Besòs, Spain
G	15	Breezie Williams	5 ft 5 in (1.65 m)	Jr	New Hampshire	Canton, OH
F	24	Maranda Nyborg	6 ft 3 in (1.91 m)	GS	Fordham	Bethel, CT
F	31	Alejandra Ferreirós	6 ft 1 in (1.85 m)	Jr	Colegio Estudiantes	Madrid, Spain
G	32	Martina Boba	5 ft 8 in (1.73 m)	So	Institut Argentona	Argentona, Spain
F	55	Nia Scott	6 ft 1 in (1.85 m)	So	Shawnee High School	Medford Lakes, NJ

Head coach

- Lynne-Ann Kokoski (Bryant)

Assistant coach(es)

- Cristina Centeno (Siena)
- Sarah Assante (Saint Joseph's (ME))
- Gadson Lefft (Delaware)
- Reilly Howard (Florida State)

Legend

- (C) Team captain
- (S) Suspended
- (I) Ineligible
- (W) Walk-on
- Injured
- Current redshirt

Roster
Last update: December 10, 2024

== Schedule and results ==
Date time, TV	Rank^{#}	Opponent^{#}	Result	Record	Site (attendance) city, state
Non-conference regular season
November 4, 2024*; 6:00 p.m., ESPN+		Merrimack	W 65–50	1–0	Chace Athletic Center (450); Smithfield, RI
November 8, 2024*; 5:00 p.m., ESPN+		Bridgewater State	W 80–57	2–0	Chace Athletic Center (3,451); Smithfield, RI
November 12, 2024*; 7:00 p.m., NEC Front Row		at Central Connecticut	W 59–48	3–0	William H. Detrick Gymnasium (502); New Britain, CT
November 15, 2024*; 5:00 p.m., ESPN+		at Rider	W 62–54	4–0	Alumni Gymnasium (489); Lawrenceville, NJ
November 16, 2024*; 4:30 p.m., FloHoops		at Seton Hall	L 39–55	4–1	Walsh Gymnasium (763); South Orange, NJ
November 19, 2024*; 6:30 p.m., ESPN+		at Cornell	W 60–53	5–1	Newman Arena (258); Ithaca, NY
November 22, 2024*; 6:00 p.m., ESPN+		Stonehill	W 82–71	6–1	Chace Athletic Center (391); Smithfield, RI
November 29, 2024*; 1:30 p.m., ESPN+		Yale	W 67–52	7–1	Chace Athletic Center (287); Smithfield, RI
December 7, 2024*; 2:00 p.m., ESPN+		Marist	L 52–63	7–2	Chace Athletic Center (285); Smithfield, RI
December 10, 2024*; 4:00 p.m., ESPN+		at Brown	L 50–53	7–3	Pizzitola Sports Center (211); Providence, RI
December 15, 2024*; 12:00 p.m., ACCNX		at Boston College	L 46–94	7–4	Conte Forum (647); Chestnut Hill, MA
December 28, 2024*; 1:00 p.m.		vs. Coppin State; FDU Christmas Classic	L 52–69	7–5	Bogota Savings Bank Center (185); Hackensack, NJ
December 29, 2024*; 3:30 p.m.		at Fairleigh Dickinson; FDU Christmas Classic	L 49–63	7–6	Bogota Savings Bank Center (300); Hackensack, NJ
America East regular season
January 2, 2025; 6:00 p.m., ESPN+		at New Hampshire	W 61–49	8–6 (1–0)	Lundholm Gym (342); Durham, NH
January 4, 2025; 1:00 p.m., ESPN+		at Maine	L 64–87	8–7 (1–1)	Memorial Gymnasium (1,196); Orono, ME
January 11, 2025; 2:00 p.m., ESPN+		at Vermont	L 43–74	8–8 (1–2)	Patrick Gym (1,011); Burlington, VT
January 16, 2025; 6:00 p.m., ESPN+		Albany; Team Impact Game	L 40–55	8–9 (1–3)	Chace Athletic Center (202); Smithfield, RI
January 18, 2025; 1:00 p.m., ESPN+		at UMass Lowell	W 64–43	9–9 (2–3)	Costello Athletic Center (310); Lowell, MA
January 23, 2025; 5:00 p.m., ESPN+		New Hampshire	W 42–41	10–9 (3–3)	Chace Athletic Center (395); Smithfield, RI
January 25, 2025; 2:00 p.m., ESPN+		at Binghamton	W 68–54	11–9 (4–3)	Dr. Bai Lee Court (1,758); Vestal, NY
January 30, 2025; 6:00 p.m., ESPN+		UMBC	L 46–49	11–10 (4–4)	Chace Athletic Center (185); Smithfield, RI
February 1, 2025; 2:00 p.m., ESPN+		NJIT	W 71–66	12–10 (5–4)	Chace Athletic Center (430); Smithfield, RI
February 6, 2025; 6:30 p.m., ESPN+		at Albany	L 43–48	12–11 (5–5)	Broadview Center (949); Albany, NY
February 8, 2025; 4:00 p.m., ESPN+		Binghamton	W 68–62	13–11 (6–5)	Chace Athletic Center (362); Smithfield, RI
February 13, 2025; 6:00 p.m., ESPN+		at NJIT	L 53–64	13–12 (6–6)	Wellness and Events Center (232); Newark, NJ
February 15, 2025; 4:00 p.m., ESPN+		at UMBC	L 67–75	13–13 (6–7)	Chesapeake Employers Insurance Arena (581); Catonsville, MD
February 20, 2025; 6:00 p.m., ESPN+		Vermont	W 61–53	14–13 (7–7)	Chace Athletic Center (317); Smithfield, RI
February 27, 2025; 6:00 p.m., ESPN+		UMass Lowell	W 64–52	15–13 (8–7)	Chace Athletic Center (250); Smithfield, RI
March 1, 2025; 2:00 p.m., ESPN+		Maine	W 68–57	16–13 (9–7)	Chace Athletic Center (375); Smithfield, RI
America East tournament
March 6, 2025; 6:00 pm, ESPN+	(3)	(6) Binghamton; Quarterfinals	W 66–63	17–13	Chace Athletic Center (222); Smithfield, RI
March 10, 2025; 6:00 pm, ESPN+	(3)	(2) Vermont; Semifinals	L 45–62	17–14	Patrick Gym (1,069); Burlington, VT
WNIT
March 20, 2025*; 5:00 p.m., ESPN+		Army; Round 1	L 58–59	17–15	Chace Athletic Center; Smithfield, RI
*Non-conference game. ^{#}Rankings from AP poll. (#) Tournament seedings in parentheses. All times are in Eastern.
