= 2024–25 Vermont Catamounts women's basketball team =

American college basketball season

2024–25 Vermont Catamounts women's basketball

America East tournament champions

NCAA tournament, First round
- Conference: America East Conference
- Record: 21–13 (13–3 America East)
- Head coach: Alisa Kresge (6th season)
- Associate head coach: Will Lanier
- Assistant coaches: Hayley Moore; Lindsay Werner
- Home arena: Patrick Gym

2024–25 America East Conference women's basketball standings
	Conf.				Overall
Team	W		L	PCT	W		L	PCT
Albany	14	–	2	.875	26	–	7	.788
Vermont †	13	–	3	.813	21	–	13	.618
Bryant	9	–	7	.563	17	–	15	.531
Maine	9	–	7	.563	15	–	16	.484
NJIT	8	–	8	.500	11	–	19	.367
Binghamton	7	–	9	.438	15	–	15	.500
UMBC	7	–	9	.438	14	–	15	.483
New Hampshire	4	–	12	.250	10	–	20	.333
UMass Lowell	1	–	15	.063	3	–	25	.107
† 2025 AmEast tournament winner

The 2024–25 Vermont Catamounts women's basketball team represented the University of Vermont during the 2024–25 NCAA Division I women's basketball season. The Catamounts, led by sixth-year head coach Alisa Kresge, played their home games at the Patrick Gym in Burlington, Vermont as members of the America East Conference.

== Previous season ==
The Catamounts finished the 2023–24 season 25–12, 12–4 in America East play, to finish in third place. They defeated UMBC and Albany before falling to Maine in the America East tournament championship game. They received an at-large bid to the WNIT, where they defeated Niagara in the second round, Colgate in the Super 16 and Purdue in the Great 8, before falling to eventual tournament champions Saint Louis in the Fab 4.

== Roster ==
2024–25 Vermont Catamounts women's basketball team
Players
Coaches

Pos.	#	Name	Height	Year	Previous school	Hometown
G	0	Malia Lenz	5 ft 10 in (1.78 m)	So	Abbotsford Senior Secondary School	Chilliwack, British Columbia
G	1	Lexi Kerstein	5 ft 6 in (1.68 m)	So	Deerfield High School	Riverwoods, Illinois
G	3	Emma Haan	5 ft 7 in (1.7 m)	Fr	Zionsville Community High School	Zionsville, Indiana
G	4	Natalie Beaudoin	6 ft 0 in (1.83 m)	Fr	Lewiston High School	Lewiston, Maine
G	10	Bella Vito	5 ft 9 in (1.75 m)	Sr	Montville Township High School	Montville, New Jersey
G	11	Nika Kurdija	5 ft 9 in (1.75 m)	Jr	Slavonski Brod	Gornja Vrba, Croatia
G	12	Keira Hanson	5 ft 8 in (1.73 m)	Jr	Issaquah High School	Issaquah, Washington
F	13	Julia Blanck	5 ft 11 in (1.8 m)	GS	Skidmore College	Hinesburg, Vermont
G	14	Catherine Gilwee	5 ft 8 in (1.73 m)	RS Jr	Champlain Valley Union High School	Shelburne, Vermont
F	15	Piper Risdon	6 ft 0 in (1.83 m)	Fr	Lowell High School	Lowell, Michigan
G	22	Sarah Ericson	5 ft 7 in (1.7 m)	Sr	St. Thomas Aquinas College	Norwich, Connecticut
G	23	Devon Yarde	5 ft 6 in (1.68 m)	Fr	Hilton Head Christian Academy	Bluffton, South Carolina
F	24	Anna Olson	6 ft 1 in (1.85 m)	GS	Monticello High School	Monticello, Minnesota
C	25	Nikola Priede	6 ft 2 in (1.88 m)	Jr	Riga High School	Riga, Latvia
F	33	Savanna Creal	6 ft 0 in (1.83 m)	Fr	Hamilton Chandler High School	Chandler, Arizona
F	34	Sarah Lazar	6 ft 3 in (1.91 m)	Sr	Saint Louis	Madison, Wisconsin

Head coach

- Alisa Kresge (Marist)

Assistant coach(es)

- Will Lanier (Georgia Tech)
- Hayley Moore (Binghamton)
- Lindsay Warner (Merrimack)

Legend

- (C) Team captain
- (S) Suspended
- (I) Ineligible
- (W) Walk-on
- Injured
- Current redshirt

Roster
Last update: December 15, 2024

== Schedule and results ==
Date time, TV	Rank^{#}	Opponent^{#}	Result	Record	Site (attendance) city, state
Exhibition
October 29, 2024*; 6:00 p.m.		Saint Michael's	W 75–37	–	Patrick Gym; Burlington, VT
Non-conference regular season
November 4, 2024*; 6:00 p.m., ESPN+		Missouri	W 62–46	1–0	Patrick Gym (1,068); Burlington, VT
November 8, 2024*; 8:00 p.m., B1G+		at Minnesota	L 52–74	1–1	Williams Arena (3,192); Minneapolis, MN
November 12, 2024*; 6:00 p.m., ESPN+		Providence	L 53–58	1–2	Patrick Gym (790); Burlington, VT
November 16, 2024*; 1:00 p.m., ESPN+		Holy Cross	W 67–50	2–2	Patrick Gym (877); Burlington, VT
November 18, 2024*; 7:00 p.m., ESPN+		at Dartmouth	W 61–37	3–2	Leede Arena (496); Hanover, NH
November 22, 2024*; 9:15 p.m., YouTube		vs. North Dakota State; Great Alaska Shootout semifinals	L 50–58	3–3	Alaska Airlines Center (550); Anchorage, AK
November 23, 2024*; 10:15 p.m., YouTube		at Alaska Anchorage; Great Alaska Shootout 3rd-place game	L 52–68	3–4	Alaska Airlines Center (869); Anchorage, AK
November 28, 2024*; 4:00 p.m., FloHoops		vs. Idaho State; Cancún Challenge Riviera Division	W 64–44	4–4	Hard Rock Hotel Riviera Maya (151); Cancún, Mexico
November 29, 2024*; 6:30 p.m., FloHoops		vs. Rice; Cancún Challenge Riviera Division	L 57–79	4–5	Hard Rock Hotel Riviera Maya (100); Cancún, Mexico
December 4, 2024*; 11:00 a.m., ESPN+		at Bucknell	L 59–62 ^{OT}	4–6	Sojka Pavilion (1,596); Lewisburg, PA
December 7, 2024*; 12:00 p.m., ESPN+		Manhattan	W 74–57	5–6	Patrick Gym (915); Burlington, VT
December 15, 2024*; 2:00 p.m., ESPN+		Quinnipiac	L 63–68	5–7	Patrick Gym (791); Burlington, VT
December 19, 2024*; 1:00 p.m., ESPN+		at Buffalo	L 68–70	5–8	Alumni Arena (875); Amherst, NY
December 21, 2024*; 12:00 p.m., ESPN+		at Princeton	L 45–60	5–9	Jadwin Gymnasium (792); Princeton, NJ
America East regular season
January 2, 2025; 6:30 p.m., ESPN+		at Albany	L 55–64	5–10 (0–1)	Broadview Center (1,163); Albany, NY
January 4, 2025; 2:00 p.m., ESPN+		New Hampshire	W 72–52	6–10 (1–1)	Patrick Gym (1,045); Burlington, VT
January 9, 2025; 11:00 a.m., ESPN+		UMass Lowell	W 77–52	7–10 (2–1)	Patrick Gym (3,024); Burlington, VT
January 11, 2025; 2:00 p.m., ESPN+		Bryant	W 74–43	8–10 (3–1)	Patrick Gym (1,011); Burlington, VT
January 16, 2025; 11:00 a.m., ESPN+		at Binghamton	W 55–46	9–10 (4–1)	Dr. Bai Lee Court (4,627); Vestal, NY
January 23, 2025; 6:00 p.m., ESPN+		at NJIT	W 60–38	10–10 (5–1)	Wellness and Events Center (181); Newark, NJ
January 25, 2025; 2:00 p.m., ESPN+		at UMBC	W 67–44	11–10 (6–1)	Chesapeake Employers Insurance Arena (455); Catonsville, MD
January 30, 2025; 6:00 p.m., ESPN+		Binghamton	W 53–40	12–10 (7–1)	Patrick Gym (817); Burlington, VT
February 1, 2025; 1:00 p.m., ESPN+		at Maine	L 39–45	12–11 (7–2)	Memorial Gymnasium (1,181); Orono, ME
February 8, 2025; 2:00 p.m., ESPN+		Albany	W 59–50	13–11 (8–2)	Patrick Gym (1,282); Burlington, VT
February 13, 2025; 6:00 p.m., ESPN+		at New Hampshire	W 55–46	14–11 (9–2)	Lundholm Gym (178); Durham, NH
February 15, 2025; 4:00 p.m., ESPN+		Maine	W 65–34	15–11 (10–2)	Patrick Gym (1,349); Burlington, VT
February 20, 2025; 6:00 p.m., ESPN+		at Bryant	L 53–61	15–12 (10–3)	Chace Athletic Center (317); Smithfield, RI
February 22, 2025; 2:00 p.m., ESPN+		at UMass Lowell	W 57–35	16–12 (11–3)	Costello Athletic Center (512); Lowell, MA
February 27, 2025; 6:00 p.m., ESPN+		NJIT	W 75–43	17–12 (12–3)	Patrick Gym (740); Burlington, VT
March 1, 2025; 2:00 p.m., ESPN+		UMBC	W 79–59	18–12 (13–3)	Patrick Gym (1,297); Burlington, VT
America East tournament
March 6, 2025; 5:00 pm, ESPN+	(2)	(7) UMBC; Quarterfinals	W 70–39	19–12	Patrick Gym (744); Burlington, VT
March 10, 2025; 6:00 pm, ESPN+	(2)	(3) Bryant; Semifinals	W 62–45	20–12	Patrick Gym (1,069); Burlington, VT
March 14, 2025; 5:00 pm, ESPNU	(2)	at (1) Albany; Championship	W 62–55	21–12	Broadview Center (2,238); Albany, NY
NCAA tournament
March 22, 2025; 2:00 pm, ESPN	(15 S1)	at (2 S1) No. 9 NC State; First Round	L 55–75	21–13	Reynolds Coliseum (5,500); Raleigh, NC
*Non-conference game. ^{#}Rankings from AP poll. (#) Tournament seedings in parentheses. All times are in Eastern.
