= Megan Shoniker =

American basketball coach and player

Current position
- Title: Head coach
- Team: New Hampshire
- Conference: America East
- Record: 20–40 (.333)

Playing career
- 2007–2011: Rhode Island
- 2012: Olimpia Grodno

Coaching career (HC unless noted)
- 2012–2014: St. John Fisher (asst.)
- 2014–2017: Canisius (asst.)
- 2017–2018: Canisius (assoc. HC)
- 2018–2019: Binghamton (asst.)
- 2019–2022: Rhode Island (asst.)
- 2022–2024: Rhode Island (assoc. HC)
- 2024–present: New Hampshire

Head coaching record
- Overall: 20–40 (.333)

Megan Shoniker is an American basketball coach and former player who is the head coach of the New Hampshire Wildcats women's basketball team.

== Early life and playing career ==
A native of Rochester, New York, Shoniker attended Greece Arcadia High School, where she helped lead the girls basketball team to a state championship in 2004.

== Coaching career ==
In 2012, Shoniker began her coaching career as an assistant coach for the St. John Fisher Cardinals in Rochester.

On April 24, 2024, Shoniker was hired as the eight head coach in New Hampshire Wildcats program history.
