= ASUN women's basketball tournament =

American college basketball tournament

- Conference basketball championship
- Sport: Basketball
- Conference: ASUN Conference
- Format: Single-elimination tournament
- Current stadium: Campus sites
- Played: 1986–1991 (as NSWAC Tournament); 1992–2001 (as TAAC Tournament); 2002–present (as ASUN Tournament)
- Last contest: 2025
- Current champion: Florida Gulf Coast
- Most championships: FGCU (12)
- Official website: asunsports.org

The ASUN women's basketball tournament is a postseason tournament that determines which team receives the ASUN Conference's automatic bid into the NCAA Division I women's basketball tournament.

The tournament was first held in 1986 by the New South Women's Athletic Conference, a women-only Division I conference. Following the 1990–91 basketball season, the NSWAC was absorbed by the Trans America Athletic Conference, with the TAAC incorporating all NSWAC statistics and records as its own. The conference changed its name to Atlantic Sun Conference in 2002, and rebranded itself as the ASUN Conference in 2016.

== History ==
For most of its history, the tournament was held at predetermined campus sites, a tradition which started with the inception of the women's tournament. From 2004–07, the tournament was played regularly at the Dothan Civic Center in Dothan, Alabama, though then-conference member Troy was the official host in 2004–05, and the city of Dothan was the host in 2006–07, after Troy had departed for the Sun Belt Conference. Starting in 2008, the tournament moved yet again, this time to Nashville, Tennessee, hosted by Lipscomb. In 2010, the tourney was moved to Macon, Georgia and was hosted by Mercer University through 2013. It then moved to Alico Arena on the campus of Florida Gulf Coast University near Fort Myers, Florida for two seasons. The 2016 tournament began a new era for the event, with all games being held at campus sites. Since then, all games have been hosted by the higher seed of the teams involved, except for the 2021 edition. With the 2020–21 season dramatically affected by COVID-19, the ASUN chose to move its entire tournament to the campus of Kennesaw State University in Kennesaw, Georgia.

== Results ==
Year	Champion	Score	Runner-up	Location
New South Women's Athletic Conference
1986	Florida A&M (1)	68–54	Georgia Southern	Gaither Gym, Tallahassee, Florida
1987	Georgia Southern (1)	74–69	Florida A&M	Hanner Fieldhouse, Statesboro, Georgia
1988	Georgia Southern (2)	73–66	Florida A&M	Edmunds Center, DeLand, Florida
1989	Stetson (1)	72–65	Georgia Southern	GSU Sports Arena, Atlanta, Georgia
1990	Georgia Southern (3)	71–70	FIU	Golden Panther Arena, Miami, Florida
1991	Miami (FL) (1)	73–44	Florida A&M	Gaither Gym, Tallahassee, Florida
Trans America Athletic Conference
1992	FIU (1)	88–78	Georgia Southern	Hanner Fieldhouse, Statesboro, Georgia
1993	FIU (2)	77–52	Mercer	Golden Panther Arena, Miami, Florida
1994	FIU (3)	89–67	Southeastern Louisiana	University Center, Hammond, Louisiana
1995	FIU (4)	76–74	Southeastern Louisiana	John Kresse Arena, Charleston, South Carolina
1996	Central Florida (1)	81–57	Florida Atlantic	University Center, Hammond, Louisiana
1997	FIU (5)	91–71	Jacksonville State	Edmunds Center, DeLand, Florida
1998	FIU (6)	86–50	Georgia State	Golden Panther Arena, Miami, Florida
1999	Central Florida (2)	80–59	Jacksonville State	GSU Sports Arena, Atlanta, Georgia
2000	Campbell (1)	66–49	Georgia State	Pelham Civic Center, Pelham, Alabama
2001	Georgia State (1)	64–62	Campbell	UCF Arena, Orlando, Florida
Atlantic Sun Conference
2002	Georgia State (2)	64–63	Florida Atlantic	Trojan Arena, Troy, AL
2003	Georgia State (3)	80–63	Central Florida	UCF Arena, Orlando, Florida
2004	Lipscomb (1)	64–62	Central Florida	Dothan Civic Center, Dothan, Alabama
2005	Stetson (2)	88–62	Georgia State	Dothan Civic Center, Dothan, Alabama
2006	Florida Atlantic (1)	88–62	Gardner–Webb	Dothan Civic Center, Dothan, Alabama
2007	Belmont (1)	69–57	East Tennessee State	Dothan Civic Center, Dothan, Alabama
2008	East Tennessee State (1)	72–72	Jacksonville	Allen Arena, Nashville, Tennessee
2009	East Tennessee State (2)	58–52	Jacksonville	Allen Arena, Nashville, Tennessee
2010	East Tennessee State (3)	63–62	North Florida	University Center, Macon, Georgia
2011	Stetson (3)	69–50	Jacksonville	University Center, Macon, Georgia
2012	Florida Gulf Coast (1)	67–39	Stetson	University Center, Macon, Georgia
2013	Stetson (4)	70–64	Stetson	University Center, Macon, Georgia
2014	Florida Gulf Coast (2)	72–70	Stetson	Alico Arena, Fort Myers, Florida
2015	Florida Gulf Coast (3)	60–43	Northern Kentucky	Alico Arena, Fort Myers, Florida
2016	Jacksonville (1)	56–54	Florida Gulf Coast	Alico Arena, Fort Myers, Florida
ASUN Conference
2017	Florida Gulf Coast (4)	77–70	Stetson	Edmunds Center, DeLand, Florida
2018	Florida Gulf Coast (5)	68–58	Jacksonville	Alico Arena, Fort Myers, Florida
2019	Florida Gulf Coast (6)	72–49	Liberty	Alico Arena, Fort Myers, Florida
2020	Tournament canceled due to COVID-19 pandemic			
2021	Florida Gulf Coast (7)	84–62	Liberty	KSU Convocation Center, Kennesaw, Georgia
2022	Florida Gulf Coast (8)	69–54	Jacksonville State	Campus sites
2023	Florida Gulf Coast (9)	84–60	Liberty	Campus sites
2024	Florida Gulf Coast (10)	76–47	Central Arkansas	Campus sites
2025	Florida Gulf Coast (11)	68–51	Central Arkansas	Campus sites
2026	Jacksonville (2)	66–63 (OT)	Austin Peay	Campus sites

== Champions ==
School	Championships	Championships Years
Florida Gulf Coast	12	2012, 2014, 2015, 2017, 2018, 2019, 2020^{Co}, 2021, 2022, 2023, 2024, 2025
FIU	6	1992, 1993, 1994, 1995, 1997, 1998
Stetson	4	1989, 2005, 2011, 2013
East Tennessee State	3	2008, 2009, 2010
Georgia State	3	2001, 2002, 2003
Georgia Southern	3	1987, 1988, 1990
Jacksonville	2	2016, 2026
UCF	2	1996, 1999
Belmont	1	2007
Lipscomb	1	2004
Campbell	1	2000
Florida Atlantic	1	2006
Miami (FL)	1	1991
Florida A&M	1	1986
Liberty	1	2020^{Co}

- Austin Peay, Bellarmine, Central Arkansas, Eastern Kentucky, North Alabama, North Florida, and Queens (NC) have not yet won an ASUN tournament.
- Centenary (LA), Charleston, Gardner–Webb, Kennesaw State, Mercer, Northern Kentucky, NJIT, Samford, Southeastern Louisiana, Troy, and USC Upstate never won the tournament as a ASUN members.
- Schools highlighted in pink are former members of the ASUN as of the 2023–24 season.

== See also ==
- ASUN men's basketball tournament
