= 2025–26 West Georgia Wolves women's basketball team =

American college basketball season

2025–26 West Georgia Wolves women's basketball
- Conference: Atlantic Sun Conference
- Record: 18–13 (10–8 ASUN)
- Head coach: Joanna Reitz (4th season)
- Assistant coaches: Todd Webb; Krystle Evans; Kaitlyn Judge
- Home arena: The Coliseum

2025–26 ASUN women's basketball standings
	Conf.				Overall
Team	W		L	PCT	W		L	PCT
Eastern Kentucky	15	–	3	.833	25	–	9	.735
Jacksonville †	13	–	5	.722	24	–	9	.727
Central Arkansas	13	–	5	.722	21	–	11	.656
Stetson	12	–	6	.667	20	–	12	.625
Florida Gulf Coast	11	–	7	.611	16	–	16	.500
North Alabama	11	–	7	.611	17	–	14	.548
West Georgia*	10	–	8	.556	18	–	13	.581
Austin Peay	8	–	10	.444	19	–	14	.576
Lipscomb	7	–	11	.389	10	–	20	.333
North Florida	4	–	14	.222	9	–	21	.300
Queens	4	–	14	.222	10	–	20	.333
Bellarmine	0	–	18	.000	2	–	30	.063
† 2026 ASUN tournament winner * ineligible for the 2026 NCAA tournament due to transition from Division II

The 2025–26 West Georgia Wolves women's basketball team represents the University of West Georgia during the 2025–26 NCAA Division I women's basketball season. The Wolves, led by fourth-year head coach Joanna Reitz, play their home games at The Coliseum in Carrollton, Georgia as second-year members of the Atlantic Sun Conference.

This season will mark West Georgia's second year of a now three-year transition period from Division II to Division I, thanks to a ruling from the NCAA in January 2025 that reduced the transition period from DII to DI by a year, from four years to three years. As a result, the Wolves are now currently ineligible to participate in the NCAA tournament until the 2027–28 season.

== Previous season ==
The Wolves finished the 2024–25 season 13–17, 7–11 in ASUN play, to finish in a tie for ninth place. They were defeated by Austin Peay in the first round of the ASUN tournament.

== Preseason ==
On October 17, 2025, the Atlantic Sun Conference released their preseason coaches and media polls. West Georgia was picked to finish tenth in both the coaches poll, and the media poll.

=== Preseason rankings ===
ASUN Preseason Coaches' Poll
Place	Team	Votes
1	Florida Gulf Coast	128 (6)
2	Central Arkansas	124 (3)
3	Stetson	118 (1)
4	Lipscomb	98
5	Eastern Kentucky	97 (1)
6	North Alabama	77
7	Jacksonville	73
8	Austin Peay	61
9	Bellarmine	49
10	West Georgia	48
11	Queens	37 (1)
12	North Florida	26
(#) first-place votes

ASUN Preseason Media Poll
Place	Team	Votes
1	Florida Gulf Coast	474 (36)
2	Central Arkansas	416
3	Lipscomb	370
4	Eastern Kentucky	368 (2)
5	Stetson	308
6	North Alabama	240
7	Jacksonville	238
8	Bellarmine	216
9	Austin Peay	172
10	West Georgia	146
11	North Florida	88
12	Queens	84
(#) first-place votes

=== Preseason All-ASUN Team ===
Preseason All-ASUN Team
Player	Year	Position
Destiny Jones	Sophomore	Forward
Sydne Tolbert	Junior	Guard

== Roster ==
2025–26 West Georgia Wolves women's basketball team
Players
Coaches

Pos.	#	Name	Height	Year	Previous school	Hometown
G	1	Sydne Tolbert	5 ft 4 in (1.63 m)	Jr	duPont Manual High School	Louisville, Kentucky
F	2	Anya McKenzie	6 ft 2 in (1.88 m)	Jr	Tarleton State	Luton, England
G	3	Asia Donald	5 ft 9 in (1.75 m)	So	Indiana State	Hobart, Indiana
G	4	Tayah Morgan	5 ft 10 in (1.78 m)	Jr	Dodge City Community College	Perth, Australia
G	5	Grace O'Gara	5 ft 5 in (1.65 m)	Jr	Auburn Montgomery	Worcester, Massachusetts
G	10	Calie Thrower	5 ft 6 in (1.68 m)	Sr	West Forsyth High School	Cumming, Georgia
F	11	Gal-la Font	6 ft 0 in (1.83 m)	Jr	Western Nebraska Community College	Barcelona, Spain
F	12	Destiny Jones	5 ft 9 in (1.75 m)	So	Central High School	Louisville, Kentucky
G	13	Becca Ledford	5 ft 7 in (1.7 m)	Sr	Fannin County High School	Blue Ridge, Georgia
G	15	Riley Black	5 ft 9 in (1.75 m)	So	Chestatee High School	Gainesville, Georgia
F	25	Georgia Gray	6 ft 3 in (1.91 m)	Sr	Appalachian State	Melbourne, Australia
G	30	Parris Parham	5 ft 10 in (1.78 m)	Fr	Bradwell Institute	Hinesville, Georgia
F	32	Jasmine Jones	5 ft 11 in (1.8 m)	Sr	New Orleans	Carrollton, Georgia

Head coach

- Joanna Reitz (Covenant)

Assistant coach(es)

- Todd Webb (Western Kentucky)
- Krystle Evans (UCLA)
- Kaitlyn Judge (UT Dallas)

Legend

- (C) Team captain
- (S) Suspended
- (I) Ineligible
- (W) Walk-on
- Injured
- Current redshirt

Roster
Last update: February 24, 2026

== Schedule and results ==
Date time, TV	Rank^{#}	Opponent^{#}	Result	Record	Site (attendance) city, state
Non-conference regular season
November 3, 2025*; 9:00 pm, B1G+		at Oregon	L 59–100	0–1	Matthew Knight Arena (4,404); Eugene, OR
November 8, 2025*; 2:00 pm, ESPN+		Gardner–Webb	W 91–68	1–1	The Coliseum (423); Carrollton, GA
November 13, 2025*; 7:00 pm, ESPN+		Alabama State	W 64–61	2–1	The Coliseum (414); Carrollton, GA
November 19, 2025*; 7:00 pm, ACCNX		at Georgia Tech	L 60–68	2–2	McCamish Pavilion (1,628); Atlanta, GA
November 25, 2025*; 2:00 pm, ESPN+		Western Carolina	W 69–60	3–2	The Coliseum (287); Carrollton, GA
December 3, 2025*; 11:00 am, ESPN+		UNC Wilmington	W 83−63	4−2	The Coliseum (2,267); Carrollton, GA
December 7, 2025*; 4:00 pm		at South Carolina State	L 62−69	4−3	SHM Memorial Center (100); Orangeburg, SC
December 14, 2025*; 2:00 pm, SECN+		at Florida	L 41–85	4–4	O'Connell Center (1,363); Gainesville, FL
December 17, 2025*; 2:00 pm, ESPN+		Wesleyan	W 116–21	5–4	The Coliseum (236); Carrollton, GA
December 21, 2025*; 2:00 pm		at Florida A&M	W 72–57	6–4	Al Lawson Center (351); Tallahassee, FL
December 28, 2025*; 2:00 pm, ESPN+		Brewton–Parker	W 81–46	7–4	The Coliseum (278); Carrollton, GA
ASUN regular season
January 1, 2026; 6:30 pm, ESPN+		at Eastern Kentucky	L 53–69	7–5 (0–1)	Baptist Health Arena (278); Richmond, KY
January 3, 2026; 2:00 pm, ESPN+		at Bellarmine	W 106−65	8−5 (1–1)	Knights Hall (472); Louisville, KY
January 8, 2026; 7:00 pm, ESPN+		North Florida	W 76–61	9–5 (2–1)	The Coliseum (223); Carrollton, GA
January 10, 2026; 2:00 pm, ESPN+		Jacksonville	W 74–59	10–5 (3–1)	The Coliseum (358); Carrollton, GA
January 15, 2026; 7:00 pm, ESPN+		Florida Gulf Coast	W 63–56	11–5 (4–1)	The Coliseum (693); Carrollton, GA
January 17, 2026; 2:00 pm, ESPN+		Stetson	W 88–76	12–5 (5–1)	The Coliseum (442); Carrollton, GA
January 21, 2026; 7:30 pm, ESPN+		at Central Arkansas	L 66–87	12–6 (5–2)	Farris Center (746); Conway, AR
January 24, 2026; 12:00 pm, ESPN+		Queens	W 77–64	13–6 (6–2)	The Coliseum (278); Carrollton, GA
January 29, 2026; 7:00 pm, ESPN+		Eastern Kentucky	L 55–68	13–7 (6–3)	The Coliseum (513); Carrollton, GA
January 31, 2026; 2:00 pm, ESPN+		Bellarmine	W 69–39	14–7 (7–3)	The Coliseum (624); Carrollton, GA
February 5, 2026; 6:30 pm, ESPN+		at Jacksonville	L 61–82	14–8 (7–4)	Swisher Gymnasium (556); Jacksonville, FL
February 7, 2026; 2:00 pm, ESPN+		at North Florida	W 75–68	15–8 (8–4)	UNF Arena (720); Jacksonville, FL
February 11, 2026; 7:00 pm, ESPN+		North Alabama	L 60–65	15–9 (8–5)	The Coliseum (604); Carrollton, GA
February 14, 2026; 3:00 pm, ESPN+		at Austin Peay	W 95–74	16–9 (9–5)	F&M Bank Arena (947); Clarksville, TN
February 18, 2026; 7:00 pm, ESPN+		at Lipscomb	W 66–65 ^{OT}	17–9 (10–5)	Allen Arena (440); Nashville, TN
February 21, 2026; 2:00 pm, ESPN+		Central Arkansas	L 59–73	17–10 (10–6)	The Coliseum (749); Carrollton, GA
February 24, 2026; 7:00 pm, ESPN+		at Queens	L 62–72	17–11 (10–7)	Curry Arena (218); Charlotte, NC
February 27, 2026; 7:00 pm, ESPN+		at North Alabama	L 107–118 ^{4OT}	17–12 (10–8)	CB&S Bank Arena (1,561); Florence, AL
ASUN tournament
March 3, 2026; 5:00 pm, ESPN+	(7)	vs. (10) North Florida; First Round	W 76–71 ^{OT}	18–12	Swisher Gymnasium (253); Jacksonville, FL
March 5, 2026; 5:00 pm, ESPN+	(7)	vs. (2) Jacksonville; Quarterfinals	L 77–86	18–13	VyStar Veterans Memorial Arena; Jacksonville, FL
*Non-conference game. ^{#}Rankings from AP Poll. (#) Tournament seedings in parentheses. All times are in Eastern.
