= 2025–26 Central Arkansas Sugar Bears basketball team =

American college basketball season

2025–26 Central Arkansas Sugar Bears basketball
- Conference: Atlantic Sun Conference
- Record: 21–11 (13–5 ASUN)
- Head coach: Tony Kemper (3rd season)
- Assistant coaches: Kaitlynn Pacholke; Hailey Estes; Jewel Smalls
- Home arena: Farris Center

2025–26 ASUN women's basketball standings
	Conf.				Overall
Team	W		L	PCT	W		L	PCT
Eastern Kentucky	15	–	3	.833	25	–	9	.735
Jacksonville †	13	–	5	.722	24	–	9	.727
Central Arkansas	13	–	5	.722	21	–	11	.656
Stetson	12	–	6	.667	20	–	12	.625
Florida Gulf Coast	11	–	7	.611	16	–	16	.500
North Alabama	11	–	7	.611	17	–	14	.548
West Georgia*	10	–	8	.556	18	–	13	.581
Austin Peay	8	–	10	.444	19	–	14	.576
Lipscomb	7	–	11	.389	10	–	20	.333
North Florida	4	–	14	.222	9	–	21	.300
Queens	4	–	14	.222	10	–	20	.333
Bellarmine	0	–	18	.000	2	–	30	.063
† 2026 ASUN tournament winner * ineligible for the 2026 NCAA tournament due to transition from Division II

The 2025–26 Central Arkansas Sugar Bears basketball team represented the University of Central Arkansas during the 2025–26 NCAA Division I women's basketball season. The Sugar Bears, led by third-year head coach Tony Kemper, played their home games at the Farris Center in Conway, Arkansas, as members of the Atlantic Sun Conference.

== Previous season ==
The Sugar Bears finished the 2024–25 season 23–10, 15–3 in ASUN play, to finish in second place. They defeated Bellarmine and Lipscomb, before falling to top-seeded Florida Gulf Coast in the ASUN tournament championship game. They received an at-large bid to the WNIT, where they were defeated by Abilene Christian in the second round.

== Preseason ==
On October 17, 2025, the Atlantic Sun Conference released their preseason coaches and media polls. Central Arkansas was picked to finish second in both the coaches poll, with three first-place votes, and the media poll.

=== Preseason rankings ===
ASUN Preseason Coaches' Poll
Place	Team	Votes
1	Florida Gulf Coast	128 (6)
2	Central Arkansas	124 (3)
3	Stetson	118 (1)
4	Lipscomb	98
5	Eastern Kentucky	97 (1)
6	North Alabama	77
7	Jacksonville	73
8	Austin Peay	61
9	Bellarmine	49
10	West Georgia	48
11	Queens	37 (1)
12	North Florida	26
(#) first-place votes

ASUN Preseason Media Poll
Place	Team	Votes
1	Florida Gulf Coast	474 (36)
2	Central Arkansas	416
3	Lipscomb	370
4	Eastern Kentucky	368 (2)
5	Stetson	308
6	North Alabama	240
7	Jacksonville	238
8	Bellarmine	216
9	Austin Peay	172
10	West Georgia	146
11	North Florida	88
12	Queens	84
(#) first-place votes

=== Preseason All-ASUN Team ===
Preseason All-ASUN Team
Player	Year	Position
Bree Stephens^	Graduate student	Forward
(^) unanimous selection

== Roster ==
2025–26 Central Arkansas Sugar Bears women's basketball team
Players
Coaches

Pos.	#	Name	Height	Year	Previous school	Hometown
G	1	Jenna Cook	5 ft 6 in (1.68 m)	So	Cabot High School	Cabot, Arkansas
F	2	Julianna Gibson	6 ft 2 in (1.88 m)	Sr	Saint Francis (PA)	Colts Neck, New Jersey
G	4	Cheyanne Kemp	5 ft 8 in (1.73 m)	Jr	Morrilton High School	Morrilton, Arkansas
F	5	Bree Stephens	6 ft 0 in (1.83 m)	GS	Dodge City Community College	Townsville, Australia
G	6	Carla Ramirez	5 ft 10 in (1.78 m)	Fr	Unicaja Mijas	Málaga, Spain
G	9	Paris Santacaterina	5 ft 7 in (1.7 m)	Jr	San Diego	Mackay, Australia
G	11	Emerie Bohanon	5 ft 7 in (1.7 m)	Fr	Conway High School	Conway, Arkansas
G	12	Laylah Reese	5 ft 8 in (1.73 m)	Jr	Three Rivers College	Cabot, Arkansas
G	13	Alexis Cox	5 ft 8 in (1.73 m)	Fr	Conway High School	Conway, Arkansas
G	20	Shae Littleford	5 ft 8 in (1.73 m)	GS	UT Martin	Charleston, Illinois
F	22	Alivia Cox	5 ft 9 in (1.75 m)	Fr	Conway High School	Conway, Arkansas
G	23	Kaidyn Beckwith	5 ft 4 in (1.63 m)	Jr	Conway High School	Conway, Arkansas
F	24	Kamryn Griffin	5 ft 11 in (1.8 m)	So	Clark High School	San Antonio, Texas
F	25	Linda Amaning	6 ft 1 in (1.85 m)	So	Saint Peter's	Dijon, France

Head coach

- Tony Kemper (Fort Hays State)

Assistant coach(es)

- Kaitlynn Pacholke (Newberry)
- Hailey Estes (Henderson State)
- Jewel Smalls (Delaware)

Legend

- (C) Team captain
- (S) Suspended
- (I) Ineligible
- (W) Walk-on
- Injured
- Current redshirt

Roster
Last update: February 24, 2026

== Schedule and results ==
Date time, TV	Rank^{#}	Opponent^{#}	Result	Record	Site (attendance) city, state
Non-conference regular season
November 3, 2025*; 6:30 pm, SECN+		at Missouri	L 71–78	0–1	Mizzou Arena (2,402); Columbia, MO
November 7, 2025*; 6:30 pm, ESPN+		Lyon	W 115–43	1–1	Farris Center (689); Conway, AR
November 10, 2025*; 8:00 pm, SECN		at Arkansas	L 77–89 ^{OT}	1–2	Bud Walton Arena (1,981); Fayetteville, AR
November 19, 2025*; 6:30 pm, ESPN+		Arkansas State	W 81–58	4–0	Farris Center (839); Conway, AR
November 24, 2025*; 1:30 pm		vs. Samford; Georgia State Thanksgiving Classic	W 67–44	3–2	GSU Convocation Center (1,154); Atlanta, GA
November 25, 2025*; 1:30 pm		vs. Stony Brook; Georgia State Thanksgiving Classic	W 70−42	4−2	GSU Convocation Center (1,207); Atlanta, GA
November 26, 2025*; 11:00 am, ESPN+		at Georgia State; Georgia State Thanksgiving Classic	W 70−51	5−2	GSU Convocation Center (1,130); Atlanta, GA
December 1, 2025*; 6:30 pm, ESPN+		Hendrix	W 74–32	6–2	Farris Center (621); Conway, AR
December 6, 2025*; 6:00 pm, ESPN+		at Little Rock	L 48–57	6–3	Jack Stephens Center; Little Rock, AR
December 13, 2025*; 2:00 pm		at Grambling State	W 82–75	7–3	Fredrick C. Hobdy Assembly Center (789); Grambling, LA
December 17, 2025*; 6:30 pm, ESPN+		at Louisiana Tech	L 55–70	7–4	Thomas Assembly Center (1,364); Ruston, LA
December 22, 2025*; 1:00 pm, ESPN+		at Missouri State	L 61–65	7–5	Great Southern Bank Arena (1,569); Springfield, MO
ASUN regular season
January 1, 2026; 10:00 am, ESPN+		at Stetson	W 65−43	8−5 (1–0)	Insight Credit Union Arena (280); DeLand, FL
January 3, 2026; 1:00 pm, ESPN+		at Florida Gulf Coast	L 51–64	8–6 (1–1)	Alico Arena (1,610); Fort Myers, FL
January 8, 2026; 6:30 pm, ESPN+		Bellarmine	W 85–29	9–6 (2–1)	Farris Center (647); Conway, AR
January 10, 2026; 1:00 pm, ESPN+		Eastern Kentucky	L 54–64	9–7 (2–2)	Farris Center (837); Conway, AR
January 15, 2026; 5:30 pm, ESPN+		at Jacksonville	L 86–96 ^{OT}	9–8 (2–3)	Swisher Gymnasium (480); Jacksonville, FL
January 17, 2026; 1:00 pm, ESPN+		at North Florida	W 79–72	10–8 (3–3)	UNF Arena (603); Jacksonville, FL
January 21, 2026; 6:30 pm, ESPN+		West Georgia	W 87–66	11–8 (4–3)	Farris Center (788); Conway, AR
January 29, 2026; 6:30 pm, ESPN+		Florida Gulf Coast	L 52–63	11–9 (4–4)	Farris Center (856); Conway, AR
January 31, 2026; 1:00 pm, ESPN+		Stetson	L 64–70	11–10 (4–5)	Farris Center (729); Conway, AR
February 4, 2026; 6:00 pm, ESPN+		at Queens	W 64–39	12–10 (5–5)	Curry Arena (131); Charlotte, NC
February 7, 2026; 1:00 pm, ESPN+		Lipscomb	W 60–47	13–10 (6–5)	Farris Center (711); Conway, AR
February 9, 2026; 6:30 pm, ESPN+		North Alabama	W 59–48	14–10 (7–5)	Farris Center; Conway, AR
February 12, 2026; 5:30 pm, ESPN+		at Eastern Kentucky	W 60–48	15–10 (8–5)	Baptist Health Arena (638); Richmond, KY
February 14, 2026; 1:00 pm, ESPN+		at Bellarmine	W 85–37	16–10 (9–5)	Knights Hall (381); Louisville, KY
February 18, 2026; 6:30 pm, ESPN+		Austin Peay	W 67–63	17–10 (10–5)	Farris Center (684); Conway, AR
February 21, 2026; 1:00 pm, ESPN+		at West Georgia	W 73–59	18–10 (11–5)	The Coliseum (749); Carrollton, GA
February 25, 2026; 5:45 pm, ESPN+		at North Alabama	W 62–55	19–10 (12–5)	CB&S Bank Arena (1,670); Florence, AL
February 27, 2026; 6:30 pm, ESPN+		Queens	W 65–47	20–10 (13–5)	Farris Center (713); Conway, AR
ASUN tournament
March 5, 2026; 7:30 pm, ESPN+	(3)	vs. (6) North Alabama; Quarterfinals	W 67-56	21-10	VyStar Veterans Memorial Arena (1,827); Jacksonville, FL
March 7, 2026; 1:30 pm, ESPN+	(3)	vs. (2) Jacksonville; Semifinals	L 58-67	21-11	VyStar Veterans Memorial Arena; Jacksonville, FL
*Non-conference game. ^{#}Rankings from AP Poll. (#) Tournament seedings in parentheses. All times are in Central.
