= 2025–26 Queens Royals women's basketball team =

American college basketball season

2025–26 Queens Royals women's basketball
- Conference: Atlantic Sun Conference
- Record: 10–20 (4–14 ASUN)
- Head coach: Jen Brown (6th season)
- Assistant coaches: Kenneth Blake; Toia Giggetts; Taylor Todd-Williams; Kasey Kidwell
- Home arena: Curry Arena

2025–26 ASUN women's basketball standings
	Conf.				Overall
Team	W		L	PCT	W		L	PCT
Eastern Kentucky	15	–	3	.833	25	–	9	.735
Jacksonville †	13	–	5	.722	24	–	9	.727
Central Arkansas	13	–	5	.722	21	–	11	.656
Stetson	12	–	6	.667	20	–	12	.625
Florida Gulf Coast	11	–	7	.611	16	–	16	.500
North Alabama	11	–	7	.611	17	–	14	.548
West Georgia*	10	–	8	.556	18	–	13	.581
Austin Peay	8	–	10	.444	19	–	14	.576
Lipscomb	7	–	11	.389	10	–	20	.333
North Florida	4	–	14	.222	9	–	21	.300
Queens	4	–	14	.222	10	–	20	.333
Bellarmine	0	–	18	.000	2	–	30	.063
† 2026 ASUN tournament winner * ineligible for the 2026 NCAA tournament due to transition from Division II

The 2025–26 Queens Royals women's basketball team represents the Queens University of Charlotte during the 2025–26 NCAA Division I women's basketball season. The Royals, led by sixth-year head coach Jen Brown, play their home games at Curry Arena in Charlotte, North Carolina as members of the Atlantic Sun Conference.

This season will mark Queens' first year as a full Division I member, thanks to a ruling from the NCAA in January 2025 that reduced the transition period from DII to DI by a year, from four years to three years. As a result, the Royals are now eligible to participate in the NCAA tournament or the WNIT.

== Previous season ==
The Royals finished the 2024–25 season 10–19, 4–14 in ASUN play, to finish in 11th place. They failed to qualify for the ASUN tournament, as only the top ten qualify for the tournament.

== Preseason ==
On October 17, 2025, the Atlantic Sun Conference released their preseason coaches and media polls. Queens was picked to finish 11th in the coaches poll, with one first place vote, and 12th (last) in the media poll.

=== Preseason rankings ===
ASUN Preseason Coaches' Poll
Place	Team	Votes
1	Florida Gulf Coast	128 (6)
2	Central Arkansas	124 (3)
3	Stetson	118 (1)
4	Lipscomb	98
5	Eastern Kentucky	97 (1)
6	North Alabama	77
7	Jacksonville	73
8	Austin Peay	61
9	Bellarmine	49
10	West Georgia	48
11	Queens	37 (1)
12	North Florida	26
(#) first-place votes

ASUN Preseason Media Poll
Place	Team	Votes
1	Florida Gulf Coast	474 (36)
2	Central Arkansas	416
3	Lipscomb	370
4	Eastern Kentucky	368 (2)
5	Stetson	308
6	North Alabama	240
7	Jacksonville	238
8	Bellarmine	216
9	Austin Peay	172
10	West Georgia	146
11	North Florida	88
12	Queens	84
(#) first-place votes

=== Preseason All-ASUN Team ===
No players were named to the Preseason All-ASUN Team.

== Roster ==
2025–26 Queens Royals women's basketball team
Players
Coaches

Pos.	#	Name	Height	Year	Previous school	Hometown
G	1	Alyssa Lewis	5 ft 7 in (1.7 m)	Jr	NC State	Harrisburg, North Carolina
G	3	Jermany Mapp	6 ft 0 in (1.83 m)	GS	UMass	Chester, South Carolina
F	5	Brenae Jones-Grant	6 ft 1 in (1.85 m)	So	Cleveland State	Plainfield, New Jersey
G	6	Magda Freire	5 ft 8 in (1.73 m)	So	S.L. Benfica	Linda-a-Velha, Portugal
G	7	Shanelle Smith	5 ft 7 in (1.7 m)	Sr	Monroe	Staten Island, New York
F	8	Tamar Kopilevich	6 ft 3 in (1.91 m)	Sr	Eastern Wyoming College	Ashdod, Israel
G	9	Kelley Hutcherson	5 ft 9 in (1.75 m)	Fr	Culpeper County High School	Culpeper, Virginia
G	10	Ana Barreto	6 ft 1 in (1.85 m)	Sr	Ball State	Lisbon, Portugal
F/C	11	Imani Morris	6 ft 3 in (1.91 m)	Jr	Southern	Oakland, California
F	21	Hannah Hicks	6 ft 1 in (1.85 m)	GS	West Georgia	Cleveland, Ohio
G	22	Dayuna Colvin	5 ft 9 in (1.75 m)	Sr	Butler Community College	Kennesaw, Georgia
G	23	Mia Moore	5 ft 9 in (1.75 m)	Jr	Rock Valley College	Aurora, Illinois
C	31	Breah Franks	6 ft 3 in (1.91 m)	Fr	J. L. Mann High School	Greenville, South Carolina

Head coach

- Jen Brown (James Madison)

Assistant coach(es)

- Kenneth Blake (Liberty)
- Toia Giggetts (James Madison)
- Taylor Todd-Williams (East Carolina)
- Kasey Kidwell (Queens (NC))

Legend

- (C) Team captain
- (S) Suspended
- (I) Ineligible
- (W) Walk-on
- Injured
- Current redshirt

Roster
Last update: February 27, 2026

== Schedule and results ==
Date time, TV	Rank^{#}	Opponent^{#}	Result	Record	Site (attendance) city, state
Non-conference regular season
November 3, 2025*; 7:00 pm, ESPN+		Gardner–Webb	W 58–47	1–0	Curry Arena (326); Charlotte, NC
November 6, 2025*; 7:00 pm, ESPN+		Mars Hill	W 80–48	2–0	Curry Arena (151); Charlotte, NC
November 9, 2025*; 4:00 pm, ESPN+		at James Madison	L 38–87	2–1	Atlantic Union Bank Center (2,057); Harrisonburg, VA
November 15, 2025*; 4:30 pm, ESPN+		at Winthrop	L 69–75	2–2	Winthrop Coliseum (308); Rock Hill, SC
November 20, 2025*; 7:00 pm		at South Carolina State	W 76−65	3−2	SHM Memorial Center (150); Orangeburg, SC
November 23, 2025*; 2:00 pm, SECN+		at No. 2 South Carolina	L 49−121	3−3	Colonial Life Arena (15,222); Columbia, SC
November 30, 2025*; 1:00 pm, FloCollege		at UNC Wilmington	L 59–69	3–4	Trask Coliseum (826); Wilmington, NC
December 7, 2025*; 2:00 pm, ESPN+		at Western Carolina	W 71–64	4–4	Ramsey Center (641); Cullowhee, NC
December 14, 2025*; 2:00 pm, ESPN+		Carolina	W 97–37	5–4	Curry Arena (117); Charlotte, NC
December 17, 2025*; 12:30 pm, WCCB/ESPN+		North Carolina Central	L 51–61	5–5	Curry Arena (620); Charlotte, NC
December 20, 2025*; 2:00 pm, ESPN+		USC Upstate	W 60–35	6–5	Curry Arena (222); Charlotte, NC
ASUN regular season
January 1, 2026; 6:30 pm, ESPN+		at Bellarmine	W 58−46	7−5 (1–0)	Knights Hall (301); Louisville, KY
January 3, 2026; 2:00 pm, ESPN+		at Eastern Kentucky	L 49–103	7–6 (1–1)	Baptist Health Arena (261); Richmond, KY
January 8, 2026; 6:00 pm, ESPN+		Jacksonville	L 40–91	7–7 (1–2)	Curry Arena (135); Charlotte, NC
January 10, 2026; 2:00 pm, ESPN+		North Florida	L 51–64	7–8 (1–3)	Curry Arena (102); Charlotte, NC
January 15, 2026; 7:00 pm, ESPN+		Stetson	L 61–69	7–9 (1–4)	Curry Arena (172); Charlotte, NC
January 17, 2026; 2:00 pm, WCCB/ESPN+		Florida Gulf Coast	L 45–65	7–10 (1–5)	Curry Arena (136); Charlotte, NC
January 22, 2026; 7:00 pm, ESPN+		at North Alabama	L 60–63	7–11 (1–6)	CB&S Bank Arena (1,216); Florence, AL
January 24, 2026; 12:00 pm, ESPN+		at West Georgia	L 64–77	7–12 (1–7)	The Coliseum (278); Carrollton, GA
January 29, 2026; 7:00 pm, ESPN+		Bellarmine	W 100–48	8–12 (2–7)	Curry Arena (136); Charlotte, NC
January 30, 2026; 6:00 pm, ESPN+		Eastern Kentucky	L 59–74	8–13 (2–8)	Curry Arena (131); Charlotte, NC
February 4, 2026; 7:00 pm, ESPN+		Central Arkansas	L 39–64	8–14 (2–9)	Curry Arena (131); Charlotte, NC
February 7, 2026; 1:00 pm, ESPN+		North Alabama	L 55–71	8–15 (2–10)	Curry Arena (228); Charlotte, NC
February 12, 2026; 7:00 pm, ESPN+		at Austin Peay	L 47–85	8–16 (2–11)	F&M Bank Arena (449); Clarksville, TN
February 14, 2026; 2:00 pm, ESPN+		at Lipscomb	W 70–66	9–16 (3–11)	Allen Arena (477); Nashville, TN
February 19, 2026; 6:30 pm, ESPN+		at Jacksonville	L 49–84	9–17 (3–12)	Swisher Gymnasium (143); Jacksonville, FL
February 21, 2026; 2:00 pm, ESPN+		at North Florida	L 51–62	9–18 (3–13)	UNF Arena (640); Jacksonville, FL
February 24, 2026; 7:00 pm, WCCB/ESPN+		West Georgia	W 72–62	10–18 (4–13)	Curry Arena (218); Charlotte, NC
February 27, 2026; 7:30 pm, ESPN+		at Central Arkansas	L 47–65	10–19 (4–14)	Farris Center (713); Conway, AR
ASUN tournament
March 3, 2026; 7:30 pm, ESPN+	(11)	vs. (6) North Alabama; First Round	L 55–57	10–20	UNF Arena; Jacksonville, FL
*Non-conference game. ^{#}Rankings from AP Poll. (#) Tournament seedings in parentheses. All times are in Eastern.
