= 2025–26 Florida Gulf Coast Eagles women's basketball team =

American college basketball season

2025–26 Florida Gulf Coast Eagles women's basketball
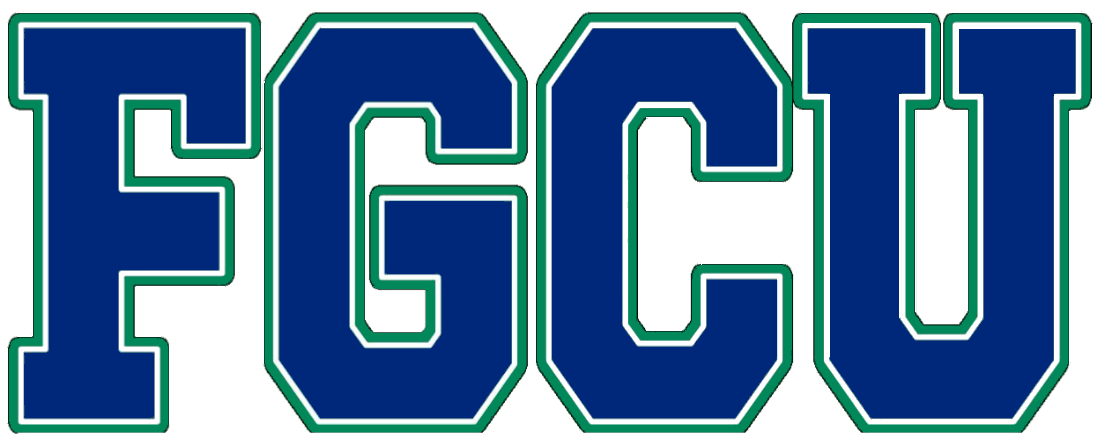

WNIT, Second Round
- Conference: Atlantic Sun Conference
- Record: 16–16 (11–7 ASUN)
- Head coach: Raina Harmon (1st season)
- Assistant coaches: Janelle Silver-Martin; Sydnei McCaskill; Will McIntire; Tyler Johnson; Nicole Foster
- Home arena: Alico Arena

2025–26 ASUN women's basketball standings
	Conf.				Overall
Team	W		L	PCT	W		L	PCT
Eastern Kentucky	15	–	3	.833	25	–	9	.735
Jacksonville †	13	–	5	.722	24	–	9	.727
Central Arkansas	13	–	5	.722	21	–	11	.656
Stetson	12	–	6	.667	20	–	12	.625
Florida Gulf Coast	11	–	7	.611	16	–	16	.500
North Alabama	11	–	7	.611	17	–	14	.548
West Georgia*	10	–	8	.556	18	–	13	.581
Austin Peay	8	–	10	.444	19	–	14	.576
Lipscomb	7	–	11	.389	10	–	20	.333
North Florida	4	–	14	.222	9	–	21	.300
Queens	4	–	14	.222	10	–	20	.333
Bellarmine	0	–	18	.000	2	–	30	.063
† 2026 ASUN tournament winner * ineligible for the 2026 NCAA tournament due to transition from Division II

The 2025–26 Florida Gulf Coast Eagles women's basketball team represents Florida Gulf Coast University during the 2025–26 NCAA Division I women's basketball season. The Eagles, led by first-year head coach Raina Harmon, play their home games at Alico Arena in Fort Myers, Florida, as members of the Atlantic Sun Conference.

== Previous season ==
The Eagles finished the 2024–25 season 30–4, 18–0 in ASUN play, to finish as ASUN regular season champions for the eighth consecutive season.. They defeated Austin Peay, Eastern Kentucky, and Central Arkansas to win their eight consecutive ASUN tournament championship, and in turn, their eight straight NCAA tournament appearance. In the NCAA tournament, they would receive the No. 14 seed in the Spokane Regional 4, where they would be defeated by No. 3 seed Oklahoma in the First Round.

After coaching the first two games of the season, on November 13, 2024, longtime head coach Karl Smesko announced that he would be leaving the program after 22+ seasons, in order to take the head coaching position of the WNBA's Atlanta Dream, with assistant coach Chelsea Lyles being named his successor the following day. Following the season, on April 4, 2025, the school announced that they would hiring Iowa assistant coach Raina Harmon as FGCU's next head coach.

== Preseason ==
On October 17, 2025, the Atlantic Sun Conference released their preseason coaches and media polls. Florida Gulf Coast was picked to finish atop the conference in both the coaches poll, with six first-place votes, and the media poll, with 36 first-place votes.

=== Preseason rankings ===
ASUN Preseason Coaches' Poll
Place	Team	Votes
1	Florida Gulf Coast	128 (6)
2	Central Arkansas	124 (3)
3	Stetson	118 (1)
4	Lipscomb	98
5	Eastern Kentucky	97 (1)
6	North Alabama	77
7	Jacksonville	73
8	Austin Peay	61
9	Bellarmine	49
10	West Georgia	48
11	Queens	37 (1)
12	North Florida	26
(#) first-place votes

ASUN Preseason Media Poll
Place	Team	Votes
1	Florida Gulf Coast	474 (36)
2	Central Arkansas	416
3	Lipscomb	370
4	Eastern Kentucky	368 (2)
5	Stetson	308
6	North Alabama	240
7	Jacksonville	238
8	Bellarmine	216
9	Austin Peay	172
10	West Georgia	146
11	North Florida	88
12	Queens	84
(#) first-place votes

=== Preseason All-ASUN Team ===
Preseason All-ASUN Team
Player	Year	Position
Cerina Rolle	(redshirt) Senior	Guard

== Roster ==
2025–26 Florida Gulf Coast Eagles women's basketball team
Players
Coaches

Pos.	#	Name	Height	Year	Previous school	Hometown
F	0	Nay Staton (5th) (C)	6 ft 0 in (1.83 m)	Sr	Towson	Jersey City, New Jersey
G	3	Cerina Rolle (C)	5 ft 9 in (1.75 m)	RS Sr	Eustis High School	Eustis, Florida
G	4	Karina Gordon (C)	5 ft 9 in (1.75 m)	Jr	East Carolina	Hallandale Beach, Florida
F	5	Mikayla Paschal	5 ft 11 in (1.8 m)	Fr	Lakewood High School	Largo, Florida
F	7	Maca Retamales	6 ft 1 in (1.85 m)	GS	Florida SouthWestern State College	Santiago, Chile
G	11	Sinai Douglas	5 ft 4 in (1.63 m)	So	Michigan State	Toledo, Ohio
F	13	Jalei Pillow	5 ft 11 in (1.8 m)	So	Eastern Florida State College	Columbia, Tennessee
G	15	Shameir Quimby	5 ft 8 in (1.73 m)	Jr	Miami Dade College	Fort Walton Beach, Florida
G	20	Airah Lavy	5 ft 10 in (1.78 m)	So	Saint Francis (PA)	Nelsonville, Ohio
F	21	Eve Alexander	6 ft 0 in (1.83 m)	So	Florida A&M	Opelousas, Louisiana
G	23	Jordan Campbell	5 ft 9 in (1.75 m)	Sr	IMG Academy	Purcellville, Virginia
F	34	Anna Mortag	6 ft 1 in (1.85 m)	GS	Butler	Milwaukee, Wisconsin

Head coach

- Raina Harmon (Central Michigan)

Assistant coach(es)

- Janelle Silver-Martin (Morgan State)
- Sydnei McCaskill (Florida Gulf Coast)
- Will McIntire (Iowa)
- Tyler Johnson (Ohio)
- Nicole Foster (Florida Gulf Coast)

Legend

- (C) Team captain
- (S) Suspended
- (I) Ineligible
- (W) Walk-on
- (5th) Fifth-year senior
- Injured
- Current redshirt

Roster
Last update: February 25, 2026

== Schedule and results ==
Date time, TV	Rank^{#}	Opponent^{#}	Result	Record	Site (attendance) city, state
Exhibition
November 1, 2025*; 2:00 pm		Lynn	W 85–74	–	Alico Arena; Fort Myers, FL
Non-conference regular season
November 8, 2025*; 7:00 pm, ESPN+		Davidson	L 51–77	0–1	Alico Arena (1,573); Fort Myers, FL
November 13, 2025*; 7:00 pm, ESPN+		Ave Maria	W 92–37	1–1	Alico Arena (1,289); Fort Myers, FL
November 19, 2025*; 7:00 pm, ESPN+		at George Mason	L 41–58	1–2	EagleBank Arena (709); Fairfax, VA
November 25, 2025*; 1:00 pm, ESPN+		Indiana	L 64–82	1–3	Alico Arena (1,632); Fort Myers, FL
November 28, 2025*; 8:00 pm, FloCollege		vs. Stanford; Resorts World Classic	W 66–62	2–3	Resorts World Events Center; Winchester, NV
November 29, 2025*; 10:30 pm, FloCollege		vs. Troy; Resorts World Classic	L 70−74	2−4	Resorts World Events Center; Winchester, NV
December 3, 2025*; 8:00 pm, ESPN+		at Arkansas State	L 58−68	2−5	First National Bank Arena (954); Jonesboro, AR
December 12, 2025*; 11:00 am, ESPN+		at Florida Atlantic	W 70–59	3–5	Eleanor R. Baldwin Arena (1,274); Boca Raton, FL
December 20, 2025*; 2:00 pm, ESPN+		No. 3 South Carolina	L 43–105	3–6	Alico Arena (3,527); Fort Myers, FL
December 22, 2025*; 1:00 pm, ESPN+		Fort Lauderdale	W 120–32	4–6	Alico Arena (1,080); Fort Myers, FL
December 29, 2025*; 2:00 pm, ESPN+		Columbia	L 44–63	4–7	Alico Arena (1,297); Fort Myers, FL
ASUN regular season
January 1, 2026; 2:00 pm, ESPN+		North Alabama	W 51–44	5–7 (1–0)	Alico Arena (1,218); Fort Myers, FL
January 3, 2026; 2:00 pm, ESPN+		Central Arkansas	W 64−51	6−7 (2–0)	Alico Arena (1,610); Fort Myers, FL
January 8, 2026; 7:00 pm, ESPN+		at Austin Peay	W 58–54	7–7 (3–0)	F&M Bank Arena (437); Clarksville, TN
January 10, 2026; 2:00 pm, ESPN+		at Lipscomb	W 63–42	8–7 (4–0)	Allen Arena (505); Nashville, TN
January 15, 2026; 7:00 pm, ESPN+		at West Georgia	L 56–63	8–8 (4–1)	The Coliseum (693); Carrollton, GA
January 17, 2026; 2:00 pm, ESPN+		at Queens	W 65–45	9–8 (5–1)	Curry Arena (136); Charlotte, NC
January 22, 2026; 7:00 pm, ESPN+		Austin Peay	L 66–74	9–9 (5–2)	Alico Arena (1,427); Fort Myers, FL
January 24, 2026; 12:00 pm, ESPN+		Lipscomb	L 44–53	9–10 (5–3)	Alico Arena (2,063); Fort Myers, FL
January 29, 2026; 7:30 pm, ESPN+		at Central Arkansas	W 63–52	10–10 (6–3)	Farris Center (856); Conway, AR
January 31, 2026; 7:00 pm, ESPN+		at North Alabama	L 55–60	10–11 (6–4)	CB&S Bank Arena (1,293); Florence, AL
February 5, 2026; 7:00 pm, ESPN+		Bellarmine	W 79–40	11–11 (7–4)	Alico Arena (1,288); Fort Myers, FL
February 7, 2026; 2:00 pm, ESPN+		Jacksonville	L 70–81	11–12 (7–5)	Alico Arena (1,502); Fort Myers, FL
February 12, 2026; 7:00 pm, ESPN+		at North Florida	W 55–51	12–12 (8–5)	UNF Arena (593); Jacksonville, FL
February 14, 2026; 2:00 pm, ESPN+		at Stetson	L 52–62	12–13 (8–6)	Insight Credit Union Arena (627); DeLand, FL
February 19, 2026; 7:00 pm, ESPN+		Eastern Kentucky	W 69–63	13–13 (9–6)	Alico Arena (1,658); Fort Myers, FL
February 21, 2026; 2:00 pm, ESPN+		at Jacksonville	L 61–70	13–14 (9–7)	Swisher Gymnasium (312); Jacksonville, FL
February 25, 2026; 7:00 pm, ESPN+		North Florida	W 58–55	14–14 (10–7)	Alico Arena (1,392); Fort Myers, FL
February 27, 2026; 7:00 pm, ESPN+		Stetson	W 67–55	15–14 (11–7)	Alico Arena (1,570); Fort Myers, FL
ASUN tournament
March 3, 2026; 2:30 pm, ESPN+	(5)	vs. (12) Bellarmine; First Round	W 94–28	16–14	UNF Arena; Jacksonville, FL
March 5, 2026; 2:30 pm, ESPN+	(5)	vs. (4) Stetson; Quarterfinals	L 63–70	16–15	VyStar Veterans Memorial Arena; Jacksonville, FL
WNIT
March 23, 2026*; 7:00 pm, ESPN+		Loyola Chicago; Second Round	L 56–62	16–16	Alico Arena (574); Fort Myers, FL
*Non-conference game. ^{#}Rankings from AP Poll. (#) Tournament seedings in parentheses. All times are in Eastern.
