= 2025–26 North Florida Ospreys women's basketball team =

American college basketball season

2025–26 North Florida Ospreys women's basketball
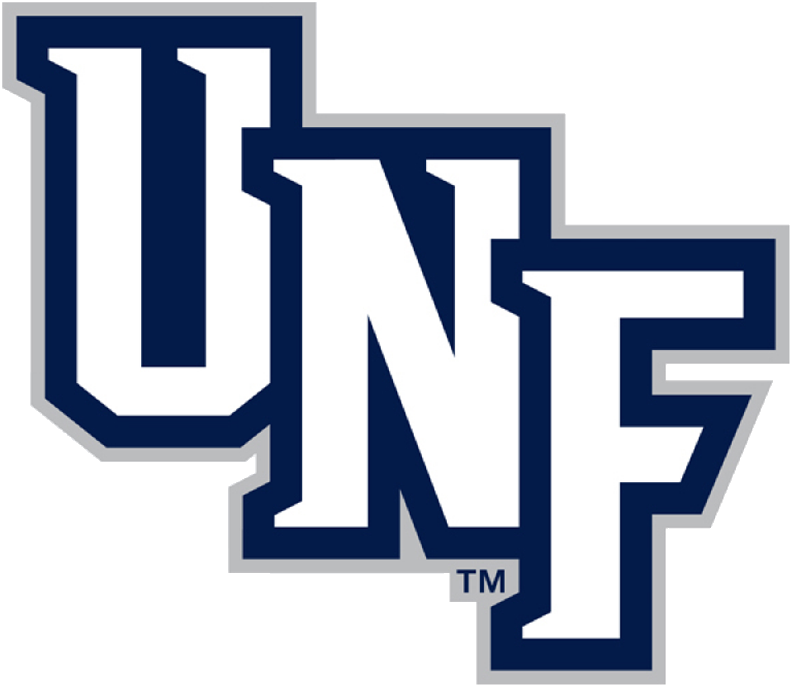
- Conference: Atlantic Sun Conference
- Record: 9–21 (4–14 ASUN)
- Head coach: Erika Lambert (3rd season)
- Associate head coach: Stacey Ungashick Lobdell
- Assistant coaches: Chris Dixon; Gadiva Hubbard; Jayla Adams
- Home arena: UNF Arena

2025–26 ASUN women's basketball standings
	Conf.				Overall
Team	W		L	PCT	W		L	PCT
Eastern Kentucky	15	–	3	.833	25	–	9	.735
Jacksonville †	13	–	5	.722	24	–	9	.727
Central Arkansas	13	–	5	.722	21	–	11	.656
Stetson	12	–	6	.667	20	–	12	.625
Florida Gulf Coast	11	–	7	.611	16	–	16	.500
North Alabama	11	–	7	.611	17	–	14	.548
West Georgia*	10	–	8	.556	18	–	13	.581
Austin Peay	8	–	10	.444	19	–	14	.576
Lipscomb	7	–	11	.389	10	–	20	.333
North Florida	4	–	14	.222	9	–	21	.300
Queens	4	–	14	.222	10	–	20	.333
Bellarmine	0	–	18	.000	2	–	30	.063
† 2026 ASUN tournament winner * ineligible for the 2026 NCAA tournament due to transition from Division II

The 2025–26 North Florida Ospreys women's basketball team represented the University of North Florida during the 2025–26 NCAA Division I women's basketball season. The Ospreys, led by third-year head coach Erika Lambert, played their home games at UNF Arena in Jacksonville, Florida, as members of the Atlantic Sun Conference.

== Previous season ==
The Ospreys finished the 2024–25 season 5–26, 1–17 in ASUN play, to finish in 12th (last) place. They failed to qualify for the ASUN tournament, as only the top ten qualify for the tournament.

== Preseason ==
On October 17, 2025, the Atlantic Sun Conference released their preseason coaches and media polls. North Florida was picked to finish 12th (last) in the coaches poll, and 11th in the media poll.

=== Preseason rankings ===
ASUN Preseason Coaches' Poll
Place	Team	Votes
1	Florida Gulf Coast	128 (6)
2	Central Arkansas	124 (3)
3	Stetson	118 (1)
4	Lipscomb	98
5	Eastern Kentucky	97 (1)
6	North Alabama	77
7	Jacksonville	73
8	Austin Peay	61
9	Bellarmine	49
10	West Georgia	48
11	Queens	37 (1)
12	North Florida	26
(#) first-place votes

ASUN Preseason Media Poll
Place	Team	Votes
1	Florida Gulf Coast	474 (36)
2	Central Arkansas	416
3	Lipscomb	370
4	Eastern Kentucky	368 (2)
5	Stetson	308
6	North Alabama	240
7	Jacksonville	238
8	Bellarmine	216
9	Austin Peay	172
10	West Georgia	146
11	North Florida	88
12	Queens	84
(#) first-place votes

=== Preseason All-ASUN Team ===
No players were named to the Preseason All-ASUN Team.

== Roster ==
2025–26 North Florida Ospreys women's basketball team
Players
Coaches

Pos.	#	Name	Height	Year	Previous school	Hometown
G	0	Jamison Cardwell	5 ft 9 in (1.75 m)	Fr	Gainesville High School	Gainesville, Florida
G	1	Jamisyn Stinson	5 ft 11 in (1.8 m)	So	Sheridan High School	Thornville, Ohio
G	3	Soraya Ogaldez	5 ft 8 in (1.73 m)	Fr	North Thurston High School	Lacey, Washington
G	4	Alonya Waldon	5 ft 5 in (1.65 m)	Jr	Samford	Melbourne, Florida
G	12	Jadah Toombs	5 ft 6 in (1.68 m)	So	Evangelical Christian School	Immokalee, Florida
G	14	Abby Knauff	5 ft 9 in (1.75 m)	Fr	The Bolles School	Jacksonville, Florida
F	20	Georgi Buzzetti	6 ft 2 in (1.88 m)	RS Jr	Florida SouthWestern State College	Buenos Aires, Argentina
G	22	Alexa Washington	5 ft 6 in (1.68 m)	RS So	Oakland Catholic High School	Monroeville, Pennsylvania
G	23	Elle Blatchford	5 ft 9 in (1.75 m)	Jr	Gardner–Webb	Canton, Georgia
G/F	24	Karyzma Pierre	6 ft 0 in (1.83 m)	Jr	Palm Beach Atlantic	Orlando, Florida
F	30	Dezuray McGill	6 ft 1 in (1.85 m)	Fr	American Heritage Schools	Miami, Florida
C	34	Jordan Brooks	6 ft 3 in (1.91 m)	GS	Minnesota	Victorville, California
F	35	Nicole Carreno	5 ft 10 in (1.78 m)	So	Seffner Christian Academy	Riverview, Florida

Head coach

- Erika Lambert (College of Charleston)

Assistant coach(es)

- Stacey Ungashick Lobdell (Florida Southern)
- Chris Dixon (Armstrong State)
- Gadiva Hubbard (Minnesota)
- Jayla Adams (North Florida)

Legend

- (C) Team captain
- (S) Suspended
- (I) Ineligible
- (W) Walk-on
- Injured
- Current redshirt

Roster
Last update: February 27, 2026

== Schedule and results ==
Date time, TV	Rank^{#}	Opponent^{#}	Result	Record	Site (attendance) city, state
Non-conference regular season
November 3, 2025*; 7:00 pm, SECN+		at Florida	L 62–96	0–1	O'Connell Center (1,183); Gainesville, FL
November 5, 2025*; 11:00 am, ESPN+		Palm Beach Atlantic	W 70–67	1–1	UNF Arena (2,639); Jacksonville, FL
November 12, 2025*; 12:00 pm, ESPN+		at Tulane	L 54–77	1–2	Devlin Fieldhouse (852); New Orleans, LA
November 14, 2025*; 12:00 pm, ESPN+		at South Alabama	L 46–83	1–3	Mitchell Center (2,529); Mobile, AL
November 20, 2025*; 6:30 pm, SECN+		at Georgia	L 46−92	1−4	Stegeman Coliseum (1,544); Athens, GA
November 28, 2025*; 1:30 pm, ESPN+		Bethune–Cookman; North Florida Invitational	W 61−57	2−4	UNF Arena (703); Jacksonville, FL
November 29, 2025*; 1:30 pm, ESPN+		Campbell; North Florida Invitational	W 56–53	3–4	UNF Arena (636); Jacksonville, FL
December 4, 2025*; 6:00 pm, ESPN+		at Georgia Southern	L 44–70	3–5	Hill Convocation Center (656); Statesboro, GA
December 6, 2025*; 2:00 pm, ESPN+		at UNC Asheville	W 76–61	4–5	Kimmel Arena (234); Asheville, NC
December 16, 2025*; 1:00 pm, ESPN+		Coastal Georgia	W 96–82	5–5	UNF Arena (701); Jacksonville, FL
December 21, 2025*; 2:00 pm, ACCN		at Clemson	L 62–84	5–6	Littlejohn Coliseum (1,004); Clemson, SC
ASUN regular season
January 1, 2026; 2:00 pm, ESPN+		Lipscomb	L 65−67	5−7 (0–1)	UNF Arena (599); Jacksonville, FL
January 3, 2026; 2:00 pm, ESPN+		Austin Peay	L 55–80	5–8 (0–2)	UNF Arena (626); Jacksonville, FL
January 8, 2026; 7:00 pm, ESPN+		at West Georgia	L 61–76	5–9 (0–3)	The Coliseum (223); Carrollton, GA
January 10, 2026; 2:00 pm, ESPN+		at Queens	W 64–51	6–9 (1–3)	Curry Arena (102); Charlotte, NC
January 15, 2026; 7:00 pm, ESPN+		North Alabama	L 54–56	6–10 (1–4)	UNF Arena (701); Jacksonville, FL
January 17, 2026; 2:00 pm, ESPN+		Central Arkansas	L 72–79	6–11 (1–5)	UNF Arena (603); Jacksonville, FL
January 22, 2026; 6:30 pm, ESPN+		at Bellarmine	W 81–58	7–11 (2–5)	Knights Hall (321); Louisville, KY
January 24, 2026; 11:00 am, ESPN+		at Eastern Kentucky	L 54–88	7–12 (2–6)	Baptist Health Arena (253); Richmond, KY
January 29, 2026; 7:00 pm, ESPN+		at Austin Peay	W 69–66	8–12 (3–6)	F&M Bank Arena (367); Clarksville, TN
January 31, 2026; 2:00 pm, ESPN+		at Lipscomb	L 65–73	8–13 (3–7)	Allen Arena (457); Nashville, TN
February 5, 2026; 7:00 pm, ESPN+		Stetson	L 56–74	8–14 (3–8)	UNF Arena (610); Jacksonville, FL
February 7, 2026; 2:00 pm, ESPN+		West Georgia	L 68–75	8–15 (3–9)	UNF Arena (720); Jacksonville, FL
February 12, 2026; 7:00 pm, ESPN+		Florida Gulf Coast	L 51–55	8–16 (3–10)	UNF Arena (593); Jacksonville, FL
February 14, 2026; 2:00 pm, ESPN+		Jacksonville; River City Rumble	L 52–58	8–17 (3–11)	UNF Arena (593); Jacksonville, FL
February 19, 2026; 5:00 pm, ESPN+		at Stetson	L 68–73	8–18 (3–12)	Insight Credit Union Arena (534); DeLand, FL
February 21, 2026; 2:00 pm, ESPN+		Queens	W 62–51	9–18 (4–12)	UNF Arena (640); Jacksonville, FL
February 25, 2026; 7:00 pm, ESPN+		at Florida Gulf Coast	L 55–58	9–19 (4–13)	Alico Arena (1,392); Fort Myers, FL
February 27, 2026; 6:30 pm, ESPN+		at Jacksonville; River City Rumble	L 71–79	9–20 (4–14)	Swisher Gymnasium (498); Jacksonville, FL
ASUN tournament
March 3, 2026; 5:00 pm, ESPN+	(10)	vs. (7) West Georgia; First Round	L 71–76 ^{OT}	9–21	Swisher Gymnasium (253); Jacksonville, FL
*Non-conference game. ^{#}Rankings from AP Poll. (#) Tournament seedings in parentheses. All times are in Eastern.
