= 2025–26 North Alabama Lions women's basketball team =

American college basketball season

2025–26 North Alabama Lions women's basketball
- Conference: ASUN Conference
- Record: 17–14 (11–7 ASUN)
- Head coach: Candi Whitaker (2nd season)
- Associate head coach: Cayla Petree (1st season)
- Assistant coaches: Sandra Abston (2nd season); Chayla Cheadle (1st season)
- Home arena: CB&S Bank Arena

2025–26 ASUN women's basketball standings
	Conf.				Overall
Team	W		L	PCT	W		L	PCT
Eastern Kentucky	15	–	3	.833	25	–	9	.735
Jacksonville †	13	–	5	.722	24	–	9	.727
Central Arkansas	13	–	5	.722	21	–	11	.656
Stetson	12	–	6	.667	20	–	12	.625
Florida Gulf Coast	11	–	7	.611	16	–	16	.500
North Alabama	11	–	7	.611	17	–	14	.548
West Georgia*	10	–	8	.556	18	–	13	.581
Austin Peay	8	–	10	.444	19	–	14	.576
Lipscomb	7	–	11	.389	10	–	20	.333
North Florida	4	–	14	.222	9	–	21	.300
Queens	4	–	14	.222	10	–	20	.333
Bellarmine	0	–	18	.000	2	–	30	.063
† 2026 ASUN tournament winner * ineligible for the 2026 NCAA tournament due to transition from Division II

The 2025–26 North Alabama Lions women's basketball team represents the University of North Alabama during the 2025–26 NCAA Division I women's basketball season. The Lions, led by second-year head coach Candi Whitaker, play their home games at the CB&S Bank Arena located in Florence, Alabama, as members of the Atlantic Sun Conference (ASUN).

== Previous season ==
The Lions finished the 2023–24 season 13–17, 8–10 in ASUN play, to finish in a tie for sixth place. As the number 6 seed in the ASUN tournament, they were defeated by number 3 seed Lipscomb in the quarterfinals.

== Roster ==
2025–26 North Alabama Lions women's basketball team
Players
Coaches

Pos.	#	Name	Height	Year	Previous school	Hometown
G	0	Bukky Akinsola	5 ft 6 in (1.68 m)	GS	Georgia Southern	Hillside, NJ
G	1	Emma Kate Tittle	5 ft 7 in (1.7 m)	Sr	Deshler High School	Tuscumbia, AL
G	2	Alexsandra Alvarado	5 ft 7 in (1.7 m)	RS Sr	San Francisco State	Richmond, CA
F	3	Venla Ulander	6 ft 1 in (1.85 m)	So	HBA-Märsky	Espoo, Finland
G	5	Brooke Hallman	—	Fr	Auburn High School	Auburn, AL
G	8	Greta Ramon	5 ft 8 in (1.73 m)	Fr	Basket Foxes Giussano	Gallarate, Italy
F	10	Sofia Ceppellotti	6 ft 1 in (1.85 m)	So	APU Udine Delser	Ruda, Italy
G	13	Katie Criswell	5 ft 10 in (1.78 m)	Jr	Lawrence County High School	Lawrence County, TN
G	20	Sofia Gaidukova	—	Fr	School No. 3, Magnitogorsk	Sergach, Russia
G/F	21	Gabby Jackson	6 ft 1 in (1.85 m)	Fr	Shawnee Mission Northwest High School	Kansas City, MO
F	22	India Howard	6 ft 0 in (1.83 m)	Sr	Johnson C. Smith	Coppell, TX
G	23	Alyssa Clutter	5 ft 9 in (1.75 m)	Sr	Trinity High School	Washington, PA
F	24	Jazzy Klinge	5 ft 10 in (1.78 m)	Sr	Johnson County CC	Overland Park, KS

Head coach

- Candi Whitaker (Texas Tech)

Assistant coach(es)

- Cayla Petree (Texas Tech)
- Sandra Abston (George Mason)
- Chayla Cheadle (Kansas)

Legend

- (C) Team captain
- (S) Suspended
- (I) Ineligible
- (W) Walk-on
- Injured
- Current redshirt

Roster
Last update: February 7, 2026

== Schedule and results ==
Date time, TV	Rank^{#}	Opponent^{#}	Result	Record	High points	High rebounds	High assists	Site (attendance) city, state
Non-conference regular season
November 3, 2025*; 6:00 p.m., ESPN+		UT Martin	W 57–54	1–0	13 – McNamara	10 – McNamara	4 – McNamara	CB&S Bank Arena (1,349); Florence, AL
November 6, 2025*; 11:00 a.m., ESPN+		Fisk	W 75–42	2–0	16 – Ceppellotti	7 – Ceppellotti	6 – Alvarado	CB&S Bank Arena (3,000); Florence, AL
November 10, 2025*; 6:00 p.m., ESPN+		Jacksonville State	W 66–54	3–0	15 – McNamara	7 – 3 tied	5 – Akinsola	CB&S Bank Arena (1,170); Florence, AL
November 14, 2025*; 10:30 a.m., SECN+		at Oklahoma	L 61–89	3–1	14 – Alvarado	7 – Jackson	2 – 5 tied	Lloyd Noble Center (7,274); Norman, OK
November 19, 2025*; 6:00 p.m., ESPN+		at Tennessee State	L 76–82	3–2	26 – Alvarado	13 – Jackson	3 – Howard	Gentry Center Complex (104); Nashville, TN
November 22, 2025*; 6:00 p.m., ESPN+		West Alabama	W 73–44	4–2	14 – Tied	7 – Jackson	4 – Akinsola	CB&S Bank Arena (1,213); Florence, AL
December 1, 2025*; 6:00 p.m., ESPN+		Arkansas–Pine Bluff	L 48–50	4–3	11 – Clutter	9 – Howard	3 – Criswell	CB&S Bank Arena (1,154); Florence, AL
December 7, 2025*; 3:00 p.m., ESPN+		at Samford	W 68–66 ^{OT}	5–3	21 – Ulander	13 – Ceppellotti	4 – Akinsola	Pete Hanna Center (373); Homewood, AL
December 14, 2025*; 2:00 p.m., ESPN+		at South Alabama	L 58–70	5–4	22 – Alvarado	7 – Klinge	6 – Akinsola	Mitchell Center (1,804); Mobile, AL
December 17, 2025*; 6:00 p.m., SWAC TV		at Alabama A&M	L 57–72	5–5	22 – Ceppellotti	7 – Ceppellotti	5 – Akinsola	AAMU Event Center (418); Huntsville, AL
December 21, 2025*; 12:00 p.m., SECN+		at Missouri	L 57–84	5–6	12 – Ramon	9 – Clutter	5 – Alvarado	Mizzou Arena (2,856); Columbia, MO
ASUN regular season
January 1, 2026; 2:00 p.m., ESPN+		at Florida Gulf Coast	L 44–51	5–7 (0–1)	13 – Alvarado	6 – Klinge	3 – Tied	Alico Arena (1,218); Fort Myers, FL
January 3, 2026; 2:00 p.m., ESPN+		at Stetson	L 59–76	5–8 (0–2)	16 – Ceppellotti	7 – Ceppellotti	4 – Tied	Edmunds Center (217); DeLand, FL
January 8, 2026; 6:00 p.m., ESPN+		Eastern Kentucky	L 78–80	5–9 (0–3)	21 – Jackson	7 – Tied	6 – Jackson	CB&S Bank Arena (1,178); Florence, AL
January 10, 2026; 2:00 p.m., ESPN+		Bellarmine	W 67–52	6–9 (1–3)	14 – Tied	12 – Jackson	5 – Klinge	CB&S Bank Arena (1,187); Florence, AL
January 15, 2026; 7:00 p.m., ESPN+		at North Florida	W 56–54	7–9 (2–3)	16 – Criswell	10 – Ceppellotti	4 – Tied	UNF Arena (701); Jacksonville, FL
January 17, 2026; 2:00 p.m., ESPN+		at Jacksonville	W 83–79	8–9 (3–3)	37 – Alvarado	12 – Jackson	4 – Tied	Swisher Gymnasium (204); Jacksonville, FL
January 22, 2026; 6:00 p.m., ESPN+		Queens	W 63–60	9–9 (4–3)	14 – Tied	9 – Tied	4 – Tied	CB&S Bank Arena (1,216); Florence, AL
January 29, 2026; 6:00 p.m., ESPN+		Stetson	L 62–66	9–10 (4–4)	21 – Alvarado	8 – Ceppellpotti	6 – Alvarado	CB&S Bank Arena (1,158); Florence, AL
January 31, 2026; 6:00 p.m., ESPN+		Florida Gulf Coast	W 60–55	10–10 (5–4)	19 – Alvarado	10 – Klinge	4 – 3 Tied	CB&S Bank Arena (1,293); Florence, AL
February 4, 2026; 6:00 p.m., ESPN+		Austin Peay	W 55–50	11–10 (6–4)	18 – Alvarado	9 – Ceppellotti	6 – Alvarado	CB&S Bank Arena (1,246); Florence, AL
February 7, 2026; 1:00 p.m., ESPN+		at Queens	W 71–55	12–10 (7–4)	23 – Alvarado	8 – Klinge	4 – Tied	Curry Arena (228); Charlotte, NC
February 9, 2026; 6:00 p.m., ESPN+		at Central Arkansas	L 48–59	12–11 (7–5)	16 – Alvarado	10 – Jackson	3 – 3 Tied	Farris Center; Conway, AR
February 11, 2026; 12:00 p.m., ESPN+		at West Georgia	W 65–60	13–11 (8–5)	22 – Criswell	12 – Klinge	8 – Alvarado	The Coliseum (604); Carrollton, GA
February 14, 2026; 1:00 p.m., ESPN+		at Eastern Kentucky	L 56–73	13–12 (8–6)	14 – 2 Tied	5 – 2 Tied	4 – Jackson	Alumni Coliseum (402); Richmond, KY
February 18, 2026; 5:30 p.m., ESPN+		at Bellarmine	W 87–54	14–12 (9–6)	21 – Ceppellotti	10 – Alvarado	6 – 2 Tied	Knights Hall (318); Louisville, KY
February 21, 2026; 6:00 p.m., ESPN+		Lipscomb	W 68–63	15–12 (10–6)	15 – Jackson	13 – Klinge	5 – Criswell	CB&S Bank Arena (1,401); Florence, AL
February 25, 2026; 5:45 p.m., ESPN+		Central Arkansas	L 55–62	15–13 (10–7)	14 – Ceppellotti	9 – Jackson	2 – 2 Tied	CB&S Bank Arena (1,670); Florence, AL
February 27, 2026; 6:00 p.m., ESPN+		West Georgia	W 118–107 ^{4OT}	16–13 (11–7)	39 – Alvarado	15 – Klinge	5 – 2 Tied	CB&S Bank Arena (1,561); Florence, AL
ASUN tournament
March 3, 2026; 6:30 p.m., ESPN+	(6)	vs. (11) Queens; First round	W 57-55	17-13	18 – Howard	12 – Jackson	3 – Tied	UNF Arena; Jacksonville, FL
March 5, 2026; 6:30 p.m., ESPN+	(6)	vs. (3) Central Arkansas; First round	L 56-67	17-14	16 – Criswell	11 – Howard	8 – Alvarado	UNF Arena (1,827); Jacksonville, FL
*Non-conference game. ^{#}Rankings from AP poll. (#) Tournament seedings in parentheses. All times are in Central.
