= 2025–26 Eastern Kentucky Colonels women's basketball team =

American college basketball season

2025–26 Eastern Kentucky Colonels women's basketball

ASUN regular season champions

WBIT, Second Round
- Conference: Atlantic Sun Conference
- Record: 25–9 (15–3 ASUN)
- Head coach: Greg Todd (5th season)
- Assistant coaches: Brie Wajer; Chad Gibney; Ashleigh Fox
- Home arena: Baptist Health Arena

2025–26 ASUN women's basketball standings
	Conf.				Overall
Team	W		L	PCT	W		L	PCT
Eastern Kentucky	15	–	3	.833	25	–	9	.735
Jacksonville †	13	–	5	.722	24	–	9	.727
Central Arkansas	13	–	5	.722	21	–	11	.656
Stetson	12	–	6	.667	20	–	12	.625
Florida Gulf Coast	11	–	7	.611	16	–	16	.500
North Alabama	11	–	7	.611	17	–	14	.548
West Georgia*	10	–	8	.556	18	–	13	.581
Austin Peay	8	–	10	.444	19	–	14	.576
Lipscomb	7	–	11	.389	10	–	20	.333
North Florida	4	–	14	.222	9	–	21	.300
Queens	4	–	14	.222	10	–	20	.333
Bellarmine	0	–	18	.000	2	–	30	.063
† 2026 ASUN tournament winner * ineligible for the 2026 NCAA tournament due to transition from Division II

The 2025–26 Eastern Kentucky Colonels women's basketball team represents Eastern Kentucky University during the 2025–26 NCAA Division I women's basketball season. The Colonels, led by fifth-year head coach Greg Todd, play their home games at Baptist Health Arena in Richmond, Kentucky, with two non-conference home games being played at the Seabury Center on the campus of Berea College in Berea, Kentucky and one non-conference game at the Clive M. Beck Center on the campus of Transylvania University in Lexington, Kentucky, as members of the Atlantic Sun Conference.

== Previous season ==
The Colonels finished the 2024–25 season 20–11, 10–8 in ASUN play, to finish in a tie for fourth place. They defeated Stetson, before falling to top-seeded and eventual tournament champions Florida Gulf Coast in the semifinals of the ASUN tournament.

== Preseason ==
On October 17, 2025, the Atlantic Sun Conference released their preseason coaches and media polls. Eastern Kentucky was picked to finish fifth in the coaches poll, with one first-place vote, and fourth in the media poll, with two first-place votes.

=== Preseason rankings ===
ASUN Preseason Coaches' Poll
Place	Team	Votes
1	Florida Gulf Coast	128 (6)
2	Central Arkansas	124 (3)
3	Stetson	118 (1)
4	Lipscomb	98
5	Eastern Kentucky	97 (1)
6	North Alabama	77
7	Jacksonville	73
8	Austin Peay	61
9	Bellarmine	49
10	West Georgia	48
11	Queens	37 (1)
12	North Florida	26
(#) first-place votes

ASUN Preseason Media Poll
Place	Team	Votes
1	Florida Gulf Coast	474 (36)
2	Central Arkansas	416
3	Lipscomb	370
4	Eastern Kentucky	368 (2)
5	Stetson	308
6	North Alabama	240
7	Jacksonville	238
8	Bellarmine	216
9	Austin Peay	172
10	West Georgia	146
11	North Florida	88
12	Queens	84
(#) first-place votes

=== Preseason All-ASUN Team ===
Preseason All-ASUN Team
Player	Year	Position
Liz Freihofer^	Sophomore	Forward
(^) unanimous selection

== Roster ==
2025–26 Eastern Kentucky Colonels women's basketball team
Players
Coaches

Pos.	#	Name	Height	Year	Previous school	Hometown
G	0	Zyniah Thomas (5th)	5 ft 5 in (1.65 m)	Sr	Arkansas–Fort Smith	Dallas, Texas
G	1	Ndidiamaka Ndukwe (5th)	5 ft 10 in (1.78 m)	Sr	Georgia Southwestern	Inkster, Michigan
G	2	Love Mays	5 ft 8 in (1.73 m)	Jr	UT Martin	Harrodsburg, Kentucky
G	3	Savannah Gardner	5 ft 11 in (1.8 m)	RS Fr	Christian Academy of Louisville	Louisville, Kentucky
F	4	Joseana Vaz	6 ft 0 in (1.83 m)	GS	Colorado State	Praia, Cape Verde
G	10	Kenleigh Woods	5 ft 6 in (1.68 m)	Fr	Ashland Blazer High School	Ashland, Kentucky
G	11	Althea Kara Angeles	5 ft 6 in (1.68 m)	GS	Old Dominion	Melbourne, Australia
G	22	Madison Lewis	5 ft 7 in (1.7 m)	Jr	Wabash Valley College	Murfreesboro, Tennessee
F	23	Jasmine Jordan	6 ft 3 in (1.91 m)	So	Rio Grande	Ashland, Kentucky
F	24	Kailani Lindsey	6 ft 1 in (1.85 m)	Jr	Foster High School	Wildwood, Florida
G	31	Liz Freihofer	5 ft 10 in (1.78 m)	So	Cooper High School	Union, Kentucky
F	32	Ella Bradley	6 ft 1 in (1.85 m)	Sr	UT Tyler	Cambridge, New Zealand

Head coach

- Greg Todd (Eastern Kentucky)

Assistant coach(es)

- Brie Wajer (Villanova)
- Chad Gibney (Wichita State)
- Ashleigh Fox (Georgia College)

Legend

- (C) Team captain
- (S) Suspended
- (I) Ineligible
- (W) Walk-on
- (5th) Fifth-year senior
- Injured
- Current redshirt

Roster
Last update: February 22, 2026

== Schedule and results ==
Date time, TV	Rank^{#}	Opponent^{#}	Result	Record	Site (attendance) city, state
Exhibition
October 17, 2025*; 7:00 pm		at Xavier	W 76–69	–	Cintas Center; Cincinnati, OH
Non-conference regular season
November 3, 2025*; 7:00 pm, ESPN+		Transylvania	W 95–41	1–0	Seabury Center (324); Berea, KY
November 7, 2025*; 12:00 pm, ESPN+		SIU Edwardsville	L 51–56	1–1	Seabury Center; Berea, KY
November 12, 2025*; 7:00 pm, ESPN+		Evansville	W 83–60	2–1	Baptist Health Arena (347); Richmond, KY
November 16, 2025*; 1:00 pm, ESPN+		North Dakota	W 57–46	3–1	Baptist Health Arena (281); Richmond, KY
November 18, 2025*; 6:00 pm, SLN		at North Dakota	W 87–66	4–1	Betty Engelstad Sioux Center (1,384); Grand Forks, ND
November 22, 2025*; 6:30 pm, ESPN+		Midway	W 107−66	5−1	Baptist Health Arena (363); Richmond, KY
November 26, 2025*; 12:00 pm, ESPN+		at Morehead State	W 73−60	6−1	Ellis Johnson Arena (330); Morehead, KY
November 29, 2025*; 12:00 pm, ESPN+		Army	W 74–64	7–1	Baptist Health Arena (491); Richmond, KY
December 10, 2025*; 1:00 pm, ESPN+		at Arizona	L 83–87	7–2	McKale Center (7,780); Tucson, AZ
December 14, 2025*; 3:00 pm, ESPN+		Marshall	L 50–75	7–3	Clive M. Beck Center (417); Lexington, KY
December 17, 2025*; 6:00 pm, ACCN		at No. 16 Louisville	L 51–76	7–4	KFC Yum! Center (6,682); Louisville, KY
December 19, 2025*; 6:00 pm, ESPN+		at Presbyterian	W 81–61	8–4	Templeton Center (194); Clinton, SC
December 29, 2025*; 1:00 pm, ESPN+		Hampton	W 70−52	9−4	Baptist Health Arena (249); Richmond, KY
ASUN regular season
January 1, 2026; 6:30 pm, ESPN+		West Georgia	W 69–53	10–4 (1–0)	Baptist Health Arena (278); Richmond, KY
January 3, 2026; 2:00 pm, ESPN+		Queens	W 103–49	11–4 (2–0)	Baptist Health Arena (261); Richmond, KY
January 8, 2026; 7:00 pm, ESPN+		at North Alabama	W 80–78	12–4 (3–0)	CB&S Bank Arena (1,178); Florence, AL
January 10, 2026; 2:00 pm, ESPN+		at Central Arkansas	W 64–54	13–4 (4–0)	Farris Center (837); Conway, AR
January 15, 2026; 6:30 pm, ESPN+		Lipscomb	W 69–60	14–4 (5–0)	Baptist Health Arena (337); Richmond, KY
January 17, 2026; 2:00 pm, ESPN+		at Bellarmine	W 90–46	15–4 (6–0)	Knights Hall (420); Louisville, KY
January 22, 2026; 6:30 pm, ESPN+		Jacksonville	W 82–63	16–4 (7–0)	Baptist Health Arena (512); Richmond, KY
January 24, 2026; 11:00 am, ESPN+		North Florida	W 88–54	17–4 (8–0)	Baptist Health Arena (253); Richmond, KY
January 29, 2026; 7:00 pm, ESPN+		at West Georgia	W 68–55	18–4 (9–0)	The Coliseum (513); Carrollton, GA
January 30, 2026; 6:00 pm, ESPN+		at Queens	W 74–59	19–4 (10–0)	Curry Arena (131); Charlotte, NC
February 4, 2026; 7:00 pm, ESPN+		at Lipscomb	W 61–55	20–4 (11–0)	Allen Arena (794); Nashville, TN
February 7, 2026; 1:00 pm, ESPN+		Austin Peay	W 67–60	21–4 (12–0)	Baptist Health Arena (630); Richmond, KY
February 12, 2026; 6:30 pm, ESPN+		Central Arkansas	L 48–60	21–5 (12–1)	Baptist Health Arena (638); Richmond, KY
February 14, 2026; 2:00 pm, ESPN+		North Alabama	W 73–56	22–5 (13–1)	Baptist Health Arena (402); Richmond, KY
February 19, 2026; 7:00 pm, ESPN+		at Florida Gulf Coast	L 63–69	22–6 (13–2)	Alico Arena (1,658); Fort Myers, FL
February 21, 2026; 1:00 pm, ESPN+		at Stetson	L 54–69	22–7 (13–3)	Insight Credit Union Arena (670); DeLand, FL
February 25, 2026; 6:00 pm, ESPN+		at Austin Peay	W 67–54	23–7 (14–3)	F&M Bank Arena; Clarksville, TN
February 27, 2026; 6:30 pm, ESPN+		Bellarmine	W 100–43	24–7 (15–3)	Baptist Health Arena (671); Richmond, KY
ASUN tournament
March 5, 2026; 12:00 pm, ESPN+	(1)	vs. (8) Austin Peay; Quarterfinals	L 41–45	24–8	VyStar Veterans Memorial Arena; Jacksonville, FL
WBIT
March 19, 2026*; 6:30 pm, ESPN+		(1) Utah; First Round	W 72–58	25–8	Baptist Health Arena (457); Richmond, KY
March 22, 2026*; 2:00 pm, ESPN+		at (4) Harvard; Second Round	L 34–63	25–9	Lavietes Pavilion (252); Cambridge, MA
*Non-conference game. ^{#}Rankings from AP Poll. (#) Tournament seedings in parentheses. All times are in Eastern.
