= 2025–26 Stetson Hatters women's basketball team =

American college basketball season

2025–26 Stetson Hatters women's basketball
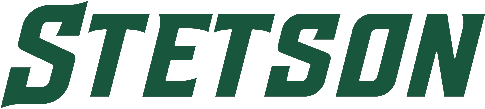

WNIT, First Round
- Conference: Atlantic Sun Conference
- Record: 20–12 (12–6 ASUN)
- Head coach: Lynn Bria (18th season)
- Assistant coaches: Sydney Moss; Matt Petersen
- Home arena: Insight Credit Union Arena

2025–26 ASUN women's basketball standings
| | Conf. | | | | Overall |
| Team | W | | L | PCT | W | | L | PCT |
|---|---|---|---|---|---|---|---|---|
| Eastern Kentucky | 15 | – | 3 | .833 | 25 | – | 9 | .735 |
| Jacksonville † | 13 | – | 5 | .722 | 24 | – | 9 | .727 |
| Central Arkansas | 13 | – | 5 | .722 | 21 | – | 11 | .656 |
| Stetson | 12 | – | 6 | .667 | 20 | – | 12 | .625 |
| Florida Gulf Coast | 11 | – | 7 | .611 | 16 | – | 16 | .500 |
| North Alabama | 11 | – | 7 | .611 | 17 | – | 14 | .548 |
| West Georgia* | 10 | – | 8 | .556 | 18 | – | 13 | .581 |
| Austin Peay | 8 | – | 10 | .444 | 19 | – | 14 | .576 |
| Lipscomb | 7 | – | 11 | .389 | 10 | – | 20 | .333 |
| North Florida | 4 | – | 14 | .222 | 9 | – | 21 | .300 |
| Queens | 4 | – | 14 | .222 | 10 | – | 20 | .333 |
| Bellarmine | 0 | – | 18 | .000 | 2 | – | 30 | .063 |
† 2026 ASUN tournament winner * ineligible for the 2026 NCAA tournament due to transition from Division II

The 2025–26 Stetson Hatters women's basketball team represents Stetson University during the 2025–26 NCAA Division I women's basketball season. The Hatters, led by 18th-year head coach Lynn Bria, play their home games at the Insight Credit Union Arena in DeLand, Florida as members of the Atlantic Sun Conference.

== Previous season ==
The Hatters finished the 2024–25 season 16–15, 10–8 in ASUN play, to finish in a tie for fourth place. They were defeated by Eastern Kentucky in the quarterfinals of the ASUN tournament.

== Preseason ==
On October 17, 2025, the Atlantic Sun Conference released their preseason coaches and media polls. Stetson was picked to finish third in the coaches poll, with one first-place vote, and fifth in the media poll.

=== Preseason rankings ===
ASUN Preseason Coaches' Poll
| Place | Team | Votes |
|---|---|---|
| 1 | Florida Gulf Coast | 128 (6) |
| 2 | Central Arkansas | 124 (3) |
| 3 | Stetson | 118 (1) |
| 4 | Lipscomb | 98 |
| 5 | Eastern Kentucky | 97 (1) |
| 6 | North Alabama | 77 |
| 7 | Jacksonville | 73 |
| 8 | Austin Peay | 61 |
| 9 | Bellarmine | 49 |
| 10 | West Georgia | 48 |
| 11 | Queens | 37 (1) |
| 12 | North Florida | 26 |
(#) first-place votes

ASUN Preseason Media Poll
| Place | Team | Votes |
|---|---|---|
| 1 | Florida Gulf Coast | 474 (36) |
| 2 | Central Arkansas | 416 |
| 3 | Lipscomb | 370 |
| 4 | Eastern Kentucky | 368 (2) |
| 5 | Stetson | 308 |
| 6 | North Alabama | 240 |
| 7 | Jacksonville | 238 |
| 8 | Bellarmine | 216 |
| 9 | Austin Peay | 172 |
| 10 | West Georgia | 146 |
| 11 | North Florida | 88 |
| 12 | Queens | 84 |
(#) first-place votes

=== Preseason All-ASUN Team ===
Preseason All-ASUN Team
| Player | Year | Position |
|---|---|---|
| Cameron Thomas^ | Senior | Guard |
| Aleah Sorrentino | Graduate Student | Forward |
(^) unanimous selection

== Roster ==
2025–26 Stetson Hatters women's basketball team
Players
Coaches

| Pos. | # | Name | Height | Year | Previous school | Hometown |
|---|---|---|---|---|---|---|
| G | 3 | Mary McMillan | 5 ft 6 in (1.68 m) | GS | UCF | Apopka, Florida |
| G | 4 | Eva Bradshaw | 5 ft 5 in (1.65 m) | Jr | Daytona State College | Oviedo, Florida |
| F | 5 | Aleah Sorrentino | 6 ft 2 in (1.88 m) | GS | UMass | Palm Bay, Florida |
| G | 10 | Jorah Eppley | 5 ft 9 in (1.75 m) | Jr | Catholic High School | Virginia Beach, Virginia |
| G | 11 | Candela Garcia-Escribano Pozo | 5 ft 11 in (1.8 m) | So | LIU | Madrid, Spain |
| F | 13 | Raven LeXander | 5 ft 10 in (1.78 m) | So | Myers Park High School | Charlotte, North Carolina |
| F | 14 | Favour Nmecha Anyaele | 6 ft 3 in (1.91 m) | Jr | Ellsworth Community College | Minna, Nigeria |
| G | 21 | Cameron Thomas | 5 ft 9 in (1.75 m) | Sr | Southwestern Michigan College | Hazel Crest, Illinois |
| G | 23 | Sophie Locatelli | 5 ft 7 in (1.7 m) | Fr | Pallacanestro Bellinzona | Sorengo, Switzerland |
| G | 27 | Promise Keshi | 5 ft 10 in (1.78 m) | Sr | Liceo Scientifico Manfredi Azzarita | Rubano, Italy |
| G | 30 | Cici Driessen | 5 ft 5 in (1.65 m) | Jr | Garden City Community College | Snellville, Georgia |
| G/F | 40 | Rose Caso | 5 ft 10 in (1.78 m) | GS | Merrimack | Ellington, Connecticut |

Head coach

- Lynn Bria (Charleston (WV))

Assistant coach(es)

- Sydney Moss (Thomas More)
- Matt Petersen (Illinois State)

Legend

- (C) Team captain
- (S) Suspended
- (I) Ineligible
- (W) Walk-on
- Injured
- Current redshirt

Roster
Last update: February 24, 2026

== Schedule and results ==
| Date time, TV | Rank^{#} | Opponent^{#} | Result | Record | Site (attendance) city, state |
Non-conference regular season
| November 3, 2025*; 5:00 pm, SECN+ | | at Alabama | L 73–82 | 0–1 | Coleman Coliseum (30); Tuscaloosa, AL |
| November 6, 2025*; 6:30 pm, ESPN+ | | Warner | W 105–40 | 1–1 | Insight Credit Union Arena (465); DeLand, FL |
| November 9, 2025*; 2:00 pm | | at Morgan State | W 70–56 | 2–1 | Hill Field House (505); Baltimore, MD |
| November 11, 2025*; 5:00 pm, FloCollege | | at Towson | L 54–76 | 2–2 | TU Arena (367); Towson, MD |
| November 21, 2025*; 6:30 pm, ESPN+ | | Trinity College (FL) | W 87–36 | 3–2 | Insight Credit Union Arena (327); DeLand, FL |
| November 25, 2025*; 12:00 pm, BallerTV | | vs. Northern Kentucky; Music City Classic | W 89−63 | 5−1 | Trevecca Trojan Fieldhouse (984); Nashville, TN |
| November 26, 2025*; 12:00 pm, BallerTV | | vs. Saint Louis; Music City Classic | W 77−67 | 5−2 | Trevecca Trojan Fieldhouse (126); Nashville, TN |
| December 3, 2025*; 7:00 pm, ESPN+ | | at UCF | W 70–67 | 6–2 | Addition Financial Arena (1,021); Orlando, FL |
| December 19, 2025*; 11:00 am, ESPN+ | | William & Mary; Holiday Hoops | L 75–81 | 6–3 | Insight Credit Union Arena (575); DeLand, FL |
| December 20, 2025*; 11:00 am, ESPN+ | | Stonehill; Holiday Hoops | W 71–65 | 7–3 | Insight Credit Union Arena; DeLand, FL |
| December 28, 2025*; 2:00 pm, ACCN | | at Miami (FL) | L 45–77 | 7–4 | Watsco Center (847); Coral Gables, FL |
ASUN regular season
| January 1, 2026; 11:00 am, ESPN+ | | Central Arkansas | L 43–65 | 7–5 (0–1) | Insight Credit Union Arena (280); DeLand, FL |
| January 3, 2026; 2:00 pm, ESPN+ | | North Alabama | W 76−59 | 8−5 (1–1) | Insight Credit Union Arena (217); DeLand, FL |
| January 8, 2026; 7:00 pm, ESPN+ | | at Lipscomb | L 53–67 | 8–6 (1–2) | Allen Arena (486); Nashville, TN |
| January 10, 2026; 3:00 pm, ESPN+ | | at Austin Peay | W 56–53 | 9–6 (2–2) | F&M Bank Arena (717); Clarksville, TN |
| January 15, 2026; 7:00 pm, ESPN+ | | at Queens | W 69–61 | 10–6 (3–2) | Curry Arena (172); Charlotte, NC |
| January 17, 2026; 2:00 pm, ESPN+ | | at West Georgia | L 76–88 | 10–7 (3–3) | The Coliseum (442); Carrollton, GA |
| January 22, 2026; 11:00 am, ESPN+ | | Lipscomb | W 66–60 | 11–7 (4–3) | Insight Credit Union Arena (726); DeLand, FL |
| January 24, 2026; 2:00 pm, ESPN+ | | Austin Peay | L 81–86 | 7–12 (0–8) | Insight Credit Union Arena (788); DeLand, FL |
| January 29, 2026; 7:00 pm, ESPN+ | | at North Alabama | W 66–62 | 12–8 (5–4) | CB&S Bank Arena (1,158); Florence, AL |
| January 31, 2026; 2:00 pm, ESPN+ | | at Central Arkansas | W 70–64 | 13–8 (6–4) | Farris Center (729); Conway, AR |
| February 5, 2026; 7:00 pm, ESPN+ | | at North Florida | W 74–56 | 14–8 (7–4) | UNF Arena (610); Jacksonville, FL |
| February 7, 2026; 2:00 pm, ESPN+ | | Bellarmine | W 76–41 | 15–8 (8–4) | Insight Credit Union Arena (605); DeLand, FL |
| February 12, 2026; 6:30 pm, ESPN+ | | at Jacksonville | L 70–76 | 15–9 (8–5) | Swisher Gymnasium (221); Jacksonville, FL |
| February 14, 2026; 2:00 pm, ESPN+ | | Florida Gulf Coast | W 62–52 | 16–9 (9–5) | Insight Credit Union Arena (627); DeLand, FL |
| February 19, 2026; 5:00 pm, ESPN+ | | North Florida | W 73–68 | 17–9 (10–5) | Insight Credit Union Arena (534); DeLand, FL |
| February 21, 2026; 1:00 pm, ESPN+ | | Eastern Kentucky | W 69–54 | 18–9 (11–5) | Insight Credit Union Arena (670); DeLand, FL |
| February 25, 2026; 7:00 pm, ESPN+ | | Jacksonville | W 85–81 | 19–9 (12–5) | Insight Credit Union Arena (515); DeLand, FL |
| February 27, 2026; 7:00 pm, ESPN+ | | at Florida Gulf Coast | L 55–67 | 19–10 (12–6) | Alico Arena (1,570); Fort Myers, FL |
ASUN Tournament
| March 5, 2026; 2:30 pm, ESPN+ | (4) | vs. (5) Florida Gulf Coast; Quarterfinals | W 70–63 | 20–10 | VyStar Veterans Memorial Arena; Jacksonville, FL |
| March 7, 2026; 11:00 am, ESPN+ | (4) | vs. (8) Austin Peay; Semifinals | L 52–68 | 20–11 | VyStar Veterans Memorial Arena; Jacksonville, FL |
WNIT
| March 20, 2026*; 7:00 pm, ESPN+ | | at FIU; First Round | L 73–76 | 20–12 | Ocean Bank Convocation Center (338); Miami, FL |
*Non-conference game. ^{#}Rankings from AP Poll. (#) Tournament seedings in parentheses. All times are in Eastern.
