= 2025–26 Bellarmine Knights women's basketball team =

American college basketball season

2025–26 Bellarmine Knights women's basketball
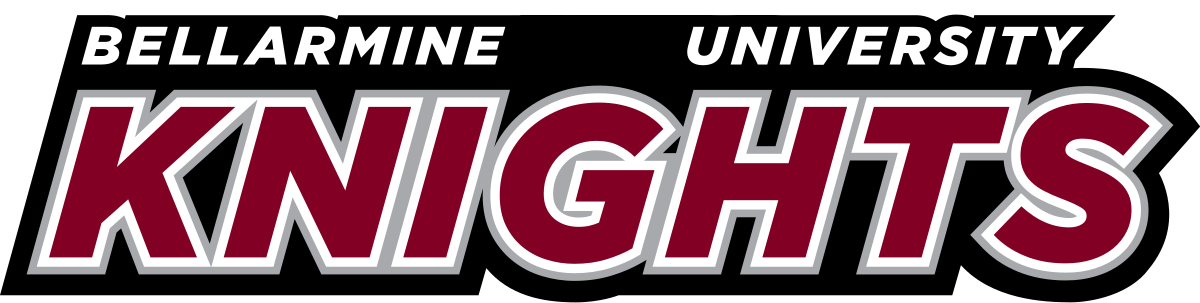
- Conference: Atlantic Sun Conference
- Record: 2–30 (0–18 ASUN)
- Head coach: Monique Reid (1st season)
- Assistant coaches: Alison McCarthy; Camille McLellan; Shaqwedia Wallace
- Home arena: Knights Hall

2025–26 ASUN women's basketball standings
	Conf.				Overall
Team	W		L	PCT	W		L	PCT
Eastern Kentucky	15	–	3	.833	25	–	9	.735
Jacksonville †	13	–	5	.722	24	–	9	.727
Central Arkansas	13	–	5	.722	21	–	11	.656
Stetson	12	–	6	.667	20	–	12	.625
Florida Gulf Coast	11	–	7	.611	16	–	16	.500
North Alabama	11	–	7	.611	17	–	14	.548
West Georgia*	10	–	8	.556	18	–	13	.581
Austin Peay	8	–	10	.444	19	–	14	.576
Lipscomb	7	–	11	.389	10	–	20	.333
North Florida	4	–	14	.222	9	–	21	.300
Queens	4	–	14	.222	10	–	20	.333
Bellarmine	0	–	18	.000	2	–	30	.063
† 2026 ASUN tournament winner * ineligible for the 2026 NCAA tournament due to transition from Division II

The 2025–26 Bellarmine Knights women's basketball team represents Bellarmine University during the 2025–26 NCAA Division I women's basketball season. The Knights, led by first-year head coach Monique Reid, play their home games at Knights Hall in Louisville, Kentucky, as members of the Atlantic Sun Conference.

== Previous season ==
The Knights finished the 2024–25 season 18–15, 8–10 in ASUN play, to finish in a three-way tie for sixth place. They defeated Jacksonville, before falling to Central Arkansas in the quarterfinals of the ASUN tournament.

Following the season, on April 2, 2025, it was announced that head coach Chancellor Dugan would be retiring, ending her 13-year tenure with the team. A little over a week later, on April 11, it was announced that assistant coach Monique Reid would be promoted to be the team's next head coach.

== Preseason ==
On October 17, 2025, the Atlantic Sun Conference released their preseason coaches and media polls. Bellarmine was picked to finish ninth in the coaches poll, and eighth in the media poll.

=== Preseason rankings ===
ASUN Preseason Coaches' Poll
Place	Team	Votes
1	Florida Gulf Coast	128 (6)
2	Central Arkansas	124 (3)
3	Stetson	118 (1)
4	Lipscomb	98
5	Eastern Kentucky	97 (1)
6	North Alabama	77
7	Jacksonville	73
8	Austin Peay	61
9	Bellarmine	49
10	West Georgia	48
11	Queens	37 (1)
12	North Florida	26
(#) first-place votes

ASUN Preseason Media Poll
Place	Team	Votes
1	Florida Gulf Coast	474 (36)
2	Central Arkansas	416
3	Lipscomb	370
4	Eastern Kentucky	368 (2)
5	Stetson	308
6	North Alabama	240
7	Jacksonville	238
8	Bellarmine	216
9	Austin Peay	172
10	West Georgia	146
11	North Florida	88
12	Queens	84
(#) first-place votes

=== Preseason All-ASUN Team ===
No players were named to the Preseason All-ASUN Team.

== Roster ==
2025–26 Bellarmine Knights women's basketball team
Players
Coaches

Pos.	#	Name	Height	Year	Previous school	Hometown
G	0	Miyah Brown	5 ft 10 in (1.78 m)	Sr	Winnebago High School	Rockford, Illinois
G	00	Mariah Daniels	5 ft 6 in (1.68 m)	Fr	Butler Traditional High School	Louisville, Kentucky
F	2	Rachel Shropshire	6 ft 3 in (1.91 m)	So	Franklin County High School	Frankfort, Kentucky
G	3	Ava Smith	5 ft 8 in (1.73 m)	So	Utah State	Camas, Washington
G	4	Triniti Ralston	5 ft 5 in (1.65 m)	Jr	Southern Indiana	Louisville, Kentucky
G	4	Megan Wearsch	5 ft 6 in (1.68 m)	Fr	Christian Academy of Louisville	Louisville, Kentucky
G	5	Carly Bryant	5 ft 5 in (1.65 m)	Fr	Bullitt East High School	Mount Washington, Kentucky
G	5	Ashlee Harris	5 ft 6 in (1.68 m)	GS	Sacred Heart Academy	Louisville, Kentucky
G/F	7	Rose Jamison	6 ft 0 in (1.83 m)	RS Jr	Napa Valley College	Fairfield, California
G	10	Maddie Janszen	5 ft 9 in (1.75 m)	Fr	Notre Dame Academy	Covington, Kentucky
G/F	11	Anna Rodgers	5 ft 11 in (1.8 m)	So	Bullitt East High School	Mount Washington, Kentucky
F	11	Clare Slocum	5 ft 7 in (1.7 m)	Fr	St. Henry District High School	Hebron, Kentucky
F	12	Kayce Hyman	5 ft 10 in (1.78 m)	So	Hammond School	Irmo, South Carolina
C	13	Haya Abdel Aal	6 ft 4 in (1.93 m)	Fr	Alexandria House of English	Alexandria, Egypt
F	14	Andrea Chiquemba	6 ft 1 in (1.85 m)	Jr	Eastern Florida State College	Vila Nova de Gaia, Portugal
G	20	Erin Toller	5 ft 7 in (1.7 m)	GS	Georgetown College	Louisville, Kentucky
G	21	Olivia Pifer	5 ft 4 in (1.63 m)	Fr	Mercy Academy	Louisville, Kentucky
C	34	Patricia Sherrill	6 ft 1 in (1.85 m)	GS	LIU	Alexandria, Virginia
C	35	Hana Abdel Aal	6 ft 2 in (1.88 m)	So	Alexandria House of English	Alexandria, Egypt
G	55	Kendall Wingler	5 ft 9 in (1.75 m)	GS	IU Indy	Ekron, Kentucky

Head coach

- Monique Reid (Louisville)

Assistant coach(es)

- Alison McCarthy (Northern Kentucky)
- Camille McLellan (Ohio State)
- Shaqwedia Wallace (Temple)

Legend

- (C) Team captain
- (S) Suspended
- (I) Ineligible
- (W) Walk-on
- Injured
- Current redshirt

Roster
Last update: February 28, 2026

== Schedule and results ==
Date time, TV	Rank^{#}	Opponent^{#}	Result	Record	Site (attendance) city, state
Non-conference regular season
November 3, 2025*; 6:30 pm, ESPN+		Spalding	W 77–51	1–0	Knights Hall (468); Louisville, KY
November 7, 2025*; 6:30 pm, ESPN+		Morehead State	L 68–84	1–1	Knights Hall (450); Louisville, KY
November 13, 2025*; 6:30 pm, B1G+		at Ohio State	L 33–90	1–2	Value City Arena (4,671); Columbus, OH
November 16, 2025*; 2:00 pm, ESPN+		Miami (OH)	L 58–77	1–3	Knights Hall (360); Louisville, KY
November 19, 2025*; 11:00 am, ESPN+		at Wright State	W 83−76 ^{OT}	2−3	Nutter Center (6,192); Fairborn, OH
November 23, 2025*; 3:00 pm, ESPN+		at Bradley	L 38−67	2−4	Renaissance Coliseum; Peoria, IL
November 28, 2025*; 4:30 pm, ESPN+		vs. East Tennessee State; Louisville MTE	L 49–55	4–3	KFC Yum! Center (426); Louisville, KY
November 29, 2025*; 1:00 pm, ESPN+		Eastern Illinois; Louisville MTE	L 63–68	2–6	Knights Hall (475); Louisville, KY
November 30, 2025*; 2:00 pm, ACCNX		at No. 23 Louisville; Louisville MTE	L 37–100	2–7	KFC Yum! Center (6,942); Louisville, KY
December 2, 2025*; 7:00 pm, B1G+		at Illinois	L 41–90	2–8	State Farm Center (3,979); Champaign, IL
December 7, 2025*; 2:00 pm, ESPN+		at Chattanooga	L 73–78	2–9	McKenzie Arena (1,185); Chattanooga, TN
December 18, 2025*; 8:00 pm, ESPN+		at Arizona	L 59−105	2−10	McKale Center (5,124); Tucson, AZ
December 21, 2025*; 7:00 pm, ACCNX		at Notre Dame	L 38–110	2–11	Purcell Pavilion (6,875); Notre Dame, IN
ASUN regular season
January 1, 2026; 6:30 pm, ESPN+		Queens	L 46–58	2–12 (0–1)	Knights Hall (301); Louisville, KY
January 3, 2026; 2:00 pm, ESPN+		West Georgia	L 65–106	2–13 (0–2)	Knights Hall (472); Louisville, KY
January 8, 2026; 7:30 pm, ESPN+		at Central Arkansas	L 29–85	2–14 (0–3)	Farris Center (647); Conway, AR
January 10, 2026; 3:00 pm, ESPN+		at North Alabama	L 52–67	2–15 (0–4)	CB&S Bank Arena (1,187); Florence, AL
January 15, 2026; 6:30 pm, ESPN+		Austin Peay	L 39–67	2–16 (0–5)	Knights Hall (302); Louisville, KY
January 17, 2026; 2:00 pm, ESPN+		Eastern Kentucky	L 46–90	2–17 (0–6)	Knights Hall (420); Louisville, KY
January 22, 2026; 6:30 pm, ESPN+		North Florida	L 58–81	2–18 (0–7)	Knights Hall (321); Louisville, KY
January 24, 2026; 11:30 am, ESPN+		Jacksonville	L 49–73	2–19 (0–8)	Knights Hall (399); Louisville, KY
January 29, 2026; 7:00 pm, ESPN+		at Queens	L 48–100	2–20 (0–9)	Curry Arena (136); Charlotte, NC
January 31, 2026; 2:00 pm, ESPN+		at West Georgia	L 39–69	2–21 (0–10)	The Coliseum (624); Carrollton, GA
February 5, 2026; 7:00 pm, ESPN+		at Florida Gulf Coast	L 40–79	2–22 (0–11)	Alico Arena (1,288); Fort Myers, FL
February 7, 2026; 2:00 pm, ESPN+		at Stetson	L 41–76	2–23 (0–12)	Insight Credit Union Arena (605); DeLand, FL
February 12, 2026; 6:30 pm, ESPN+		Lipscomb	L 44–74	2–24 (0–13)	Knights Hall (321); Louisville, KY
February 14, 2026; 2:00 pm, ESPN+		Central Arkansas	L 37–85	2–25 (0–14)	Knights Hall (381); Louisville, KY
February 18, 2026; 5:00 pm, ESPN+		North Alabama	L 54–87	2–26 (0–15)	Knights Hall (318); Louisville, KY
February 21, 2026; 3:00 pm, ESPN+		at Austin Peay	L 41–82	2–27 (0–16)	F&M Bank Arena (414); Clarksville, TN
February 25, 2026; 7:00 pm, ESPN+		at Lipscomb	L 42–87	2–28 (0–17)	Allen Arena (307); Nashville, TN
February 27, 2026; 6:30 pm, ESPN+		at Eastern Kentucky	L 43–100	2–29 (0–18)	Baptist Health Arena (671); Richmond, KY
ASUN tournament
March 3, 2026; 2:30 pm, ESPN+	(12)	vs. (5) Florida Gulf Coast; First Round	L 28-94	2-30	UNF Arena; Jacksonville, FL
*Non-conference game. ^{#}Rankings from AP Poll. (#) Tournament seedings in parentheses. All times are in Eastern.
