= 2025–26 Jacksonville Dolphins women's basketball team =

American college basketball season

2025–26 Jacksonville Dolphins women's basketball
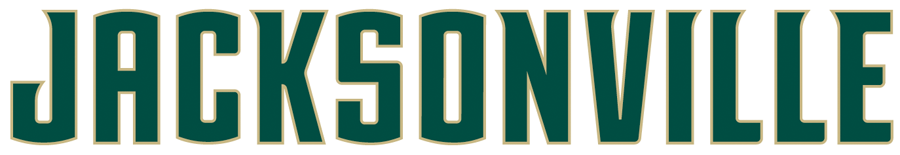

ASUN Conference tournament Champions

NCAA tournament, First Round
- Conference: Atlantic Sun Conference
- Record: 24–9 (13–5 ASUN)
- Head coach: Special Jennings (3rd season)
- Assistant coaches: Shenneika Smith; Sharay Hall; Diego Torres
- Home arena: Swisher Gymnasium

2025–26 ASUN women's basketball standings
	Conf.				Overall
Team	W		L	PCT	W		L	PCT
Eastern Kentucky	15	–	3	.833	25	–	9	.735
Jacksonville †	13	–	5	.722	24	–	9	.727
Central Arkansas	13	–	5	.722	21	–	11	.656
Stetson	12	–	6	.667	20	–	12	.625
Florida Gulf Coast	11	–	7	.611	16	–	16	.500
North Alabama	11	–	7	.611	17	–	14	.548
West Georgia*	10	–	8	.556	18	–	13	.581
Austin Peay	8	–	10	.444	19	–	14	.576
Lipscomb	7	–	11	.389	10	–	20	.333
North Florida	4	–	14	.222	9	–	21	.300
Queens	4	–	14	.222	10	–	20	.333
Bellarmine	0	–	18	.000	2	–	30	.063
† 2026 ASUN tournament winner * ineligible for the 2026 NCAA tournament due to transition from Division II

The 2025–26 Jacksonville Dolphins women's basketball team represented Jacksonville University during the 2025–26 NCAA Division I women's basketball season. The Dolphins, led by third-year head coach Special Jennings, played their home games at Swisher Gymnasium in Jacksonville, Florida as members of the Atlantic Sun Conference.

== Previous season ==
The Dolphins finished the 2024–25 season 14–16, 8–10 in ASUN play, to finish in a three-way tie for sixth place. They were defeated by Bellarmine in the first round of the ASUN tournament.

== Preseason ==
On October 17, 2025, the Atlantic Sun Conference released their preseason coaches and media polls. Jacksonville was picked to finish seventh in both the coaches poll and the media poll.

=== Preseason rankings ===
ASUN Preseason Coaches' Poll
Place	Team	Votes
1	Florida Gulf Coast	128 (6)
2	Central Arkansas	124 (3)
3	Stetson	118 (1)
4	Lipscomb	98
5	Eastern Kentucky	97 (1)
6	North Alabama	77
7	Jacksonville	73
8	Austin Peay	61
9	Bellarmine	49
10	West Georgia	48
11	Queens	37 (1)
12	North Florida	26
(#) first-place votes

ASUN Preseason Media Poll
Place	Team	Votes
1	Florida Gulf Coast	474 (36)
2	Central Arkansas	416
3	Lipscomb	370
4	Eastern Kentucky	368 (2)
5	Stetson	308
6	North Alabama	240
7	Jacksonville	238
8	Bellarmine	216
9	Austin Peay	172
10	West Georgia	146
11	North Florida	88
12	Queens	84
(#) first-place votes

=== Preseason All-ASUN Team ===
Preseason All-ASUN Team
Player	Year	Position
Priscilla Williams^	Graduate Student	Guard
(^) unanimous selection

== Roster ==
2025–26 Jacksonville Dolphins women's basketball team
Players
Coaches

Pos.	#	Name	Height	Year	Previous school	Hometown
G	0	Aniah Smith	5 ft 4 in (1.63 m)	Fr	Avon High School	Avon, Indiana
G	1	Mychal White	5 ft 6 in (1.68 m)	So	Temple College	Harker Heights, Texas
G	2	Tatum Brown	5 ft 6 in (1.68 m)	Fr	Grayson High School	Loganville, Georgia
G	4	Kimora Hester	5 ft 9 in (1.75 m)	Fr	Andrew Jackson High School	Jacksonville, Florida
G	5	Comari Mitchell	5 ft 8 in (1.73 m)	So	Western Branch High School	Richmond, Virginia
F	10	Carmaya Bowman	5 ft 10 in (1.78 m)	Jr	Shepherd	Hampstead, Maryland
G	11	Bailey Burns	5 ft 10 in (1.78 m)	Jr	Cloud County Community College	Lee's Summit, Missouri
F	12	Kali Howard	5 ft 11 in (1.8 m)	Sr	Cleveland State	Zachary, Louisiana
F	20	Mariyah Brown	5 ft 10 in (1.78 m)	RS Fr	Houston Christian	Houston, Texas
F	21	Sharmela Reid	6 ft 1 in (1.85 m)	Jr	New Hampshire	Montreal, Quebec
F	22	Mariah Knight	6 ft 1 in (1.85 m)	So	Butler High School	Louisville, Kentucky
G	23	Priscilla Williams	6 ft 2 in (1.88 m)	GS	Oregon	Houston, Texas
G	24	Makiya Miller	5 ft 7 in (1.7 m)	Sr	Wright State	Reynoldsburg, Ohio
G	32	Giana Provenzano	5 ft 11 in (1.8 m)	So	Montverde Academy	Syracuse, New York

Head coach

- Special Jennings (Xavier)

Assistant coach(es)

- Shenneika Smith (St. John's)
- Sharay Hall (Lock Haven)
- Diego Torres (Oregon)

Legend

- (C) Team captain
- (S) Suspended
- (I) Ineligible
- (W) Walk-on
- Injured
- Current redshirt

Roster
Last update: February 23, 2026

== Schedule and results ==
Date time, TV	Rank^{#}	Opponent^{#}	Result	Record	Site (attendance) city, state
Non-conference regular season
November 3, 2025*; 6:30 pm, ESPN+		Charleston Southern	W 86–84 ^{OT}	1–0	Swisher Gymnasium (124); Jacksonville, FL
November 6, 2025*; 5:00 pm, ESPN+		Florida Tech	W 75–47	2–0	Swisher Gymnasium (175); Jacksonville, FL
November 10, 2025*; 7:00 pm, SECN+		at Florida	L 55–100	2–1	O'Connell Center (1,224); Gainesville, FL
November 16, 2025*; 3:00 pm, ACCN		at Georgia Tech	W 69–64	3–1	McCamish Pavilion (1,577); Atlanta, GA
November 22, 2025*; 2:00 pm, ESPN+		FIU	W 80−69	4−1	Swisher Gymnasium (128); Jacksonville, FL
November 25, 2025*; 6:30 pm, ESPN+		Georgia Southwestern	W 77−56	5−1	Swisher Gymnasium (102); Jacksonville, FL
December 2, 2025*; 6:30 pm, SWAC TV		at Florida A&M	W 70–63	6–1	Al Lawson Center (502); Tallahassee, FL
December 6, 2025*; 2:00 pm, ESPN+		Coastal Carolina	W 68–51	7–1	Swisher Gymnasium (132); Jacksonville, FL
December 14, 2025*; 5:00 pm, ESPN+		at No. 8 TCU	L 49–89	7–2	Schollmaier Arena (2,540); Fort Worth, TX
December 17, 2025*; 12:30 pm, ESPN+		at Texas Tech	L 40–76	7–3	United Supermarkets Arena (15,098); Lubbock, TX
December 30, 2025*; 6:30 pm, ESPN+		Bethune–Cookman	W 95–53	8–3	Swisher Gymnasium (97); Jacksonville, FL
ASUN regular season
January 1, 2026; 6:30 pm, ESPN+		Austin Peay	L 65−71	8−4 (0–1)	Swisher Gymnasium (127); Jacksonville, FL
January 3, 2026; 2:00 pm, ESPN+		Lipscomb	W 72–59	9–4 (1–1)	Swisher Gymnasium (242); Jacksonville, FL
January 8, 2026; 6:00 pm, ESPN+		at Queens	W 91–40	10–4 (2–1)	Curry Arena (135); Charlotte, NC
January 10, 2026; 2:00 pm, ESPN+		at West Georgia	L 59–74	10–5 (2–2)	The Coliseum (358); Carrollton, GA
January 15, 2026; 6:30 pm, ESPN+		Central Arkansas	W 96–86 ^{OT}	11–5 (3–2)	Swisher Gymnasium (480); Jacksonville, FL
January 17, 2026; 2:00 pm, ESPN+		North Alabama	L 79–83	11–6 (3–3)	Swisher Gymnasium (204); Jacksonville, FL
January 22, 2026; 6:30 pm, ESPN+		at Eastern Kentucky	L 63–82	11–7 (3–4)	Baptist Health Arena (512); Richmond, KY
January 24, 2026; 11:30 am, ESPN+		at Bellarmine	W 73–49	12–7 (4–4)	Knights Hall (399); Louisville, KY
January 29, 2026; 7:00 pm, ESPN+		at Lipscomb	W 72–54	13–7 (5–4)	Allen Arena (449); Nashville, TN
January 31, 2026; 3:00 pm, ESPN+		at Austin Peay	W 70–68	14–7 (6–4)	F&M Bank Arena (736); Clarksville, TN
February 5, 2026; 6:30 pm, ESPN+		West Georgia	W 82–61	15–7 (7–4)	Swisher Gymnasium (556); Jacksonville, FL
February 7, 2026; 2:00 pm, ESPN+		at Florida Gulf Coast	W 81–70	16–7 (8–4)	Alico Arena (1,502); Fort Myers, FL
February 12, 2026; 6:30 pm, ESPN+		Stetson	W 76–70	17–7 (9–4)	Swisher Gymnasium (221); Jacksonville, FL
February 14, 2026; 2:00 pm, ESPN+		at North Florida; River City Rumble	W 58–52	18–7 (10–4)	UNF Arena (593); Jacksonville, FL
February 19, 2026; 6:30 pm, ESPN+		Queens	W 84–49	19–7 (11–4)	Swisher Gymnasium (143); Jacksonville, FL
February 21, 2026; 2:00 pm, ESPN+		Florida Gulf Coast	W 70–61	20–7 (12–4)	Swisher Gymnasium (312); Jacksonville, FL
February 25, 2026; 7:00 pm, ESPN+		at Stetson	L 81–85	20–8 (12–5)	Insight Credit Union Arena (515); DeLand, FL
February 27, 2026; 6:30 pm, ESPN+		North Florida; River City Rumble	W 79–71	21–8 (13–5)	Swisher Gymnasium (498); Jacksonville, FL
ASUN tournament
March 5, 2026; 5:00 pm, ESPN+	(2)	vs. (7) West Georgia; Quarterfinals	W 86–77	22–8	VyStar Veterans Memorial Arena; Jacksonville, FL
March 7, 2026; 1:30 pm, ESPN+	(2)	vs. (3) Central Arkansas; Semifinals	W 67–58	23–8	VyStar Veterans Memorial Arena; Jacksonville, FL
March 9, 2026; 5:00 pm, ESPNU	(2)	vs. (8) Austin Peay; Championship	W 66–63 ^{OT}	24–8	VyStar Veterans Memorial Arena; Jacksonville, FL
NCAA tournament
March 20, 2026*; 6:00 p.m., ESPN	(15 S2)	at (2 S2) No. 5 LSU; First Round	L 58–116	24–9	Pete Maravich Assembly Center (10,456); Baton Rouge, LA
*Non-conference game. ^{#}Rankings from AP Poll. (#) Tournament seedings in parentheses. S2=Sacramento 2. All times are in Eastern.
