= 2025–26 Lipscomb Bisons women's basketball team =

American college basketball season

2025–26 Lipscomb Bisons women's basketball
- Conference: Atlantic Sun Conference
- Record: 10–20 (7–11 ASUN)
- Head coach: Lauren Sumski (7th season)
- Associate head coach: Chris Sumski
- Assistant coaches: Sydney Shelton; Jacob Ogle
- Home arena: Allen Arena

2025–26 ASUN women's basketball standings
	Conf.				Overall
Team	W		L	PCT	W		L	PCT
Eastern Kentucky	15	–	3	.833	25	–	9	.735
Jacksonville †	13	–	5	.722	24	–	9	.727
Central Arkansas	13	–	5	.722	21	–	11	.656
Stetson	12	–	6	.667	20	–	12	.625
Florida Gulf Coast	11	–	7	.611	16	–	16	.500
North Alabama	11	–	7	.611	17	–	14	.548
West Georgia*	10	–	8	.556	18	–	13	.581
Austin Peay	8	–	10	.444	19	–	14	.576
Lipscomb	7	–	11	.389	10	–	20	.333
North Florida	4	–	14	.222	9	–	21	.300
Queens	4	–	14	.222	10	–	20	.333
Bellarmine	0	–	18	.000	2	–	30	.063
† 2026 ASUN tournament winner * ineligible for the 2026 NCAA tournament due to transition from Division II

The 2025–26 Lipscomb Bisons women's basketball team represents Lipscomb University during the 2025–26 NCAA Division I women's basketball season. The Bisons, led by seventh-year head coach Lauren Sumski, play their home games at Allen Arena in Nashville, Tennessee, as members of the Atlantic Sun Conference.

== Previous season ==
The Bisons finished the 2024–25 season 20–12, 12–6 in ASUN play, to finish in third place. They defeated North Alabama, before falling to Central Arkansas in the semifinals of the ASUN tournament. They received an at-large bid to the WNIT, where they would be defeated by Western Illinois in the first round.

== Preseason ==
On October 17, 2025, the Atlantic Sun Conference released their preseason coaches and media polls. Lipscomb was picked to finish fourth in the coaches poll and third in the media poll.

=== Preseason rankings ===
ASUN Preseason Coaches' Poll
Place	Team	Votes
1	Florida Gulf Coast	128 (6)
2	Central Arkansas	124 (3)
3	Stetson	118 (1)
4	Lipscomb	98
5	Eastern Kentucky	97 (1)
6	North Alabama	77
7	Jacksonville	73
8	Austin Peay	61
9	Bellarmine	49
10	West Georgia	48
11	Queens	37 (1)
12	North Florida	26
(#) first-place votes

ASUN Preseason Media Poll
Place	Team	Votes
1	Florida Gulf Coast	474 (36)
2	Central Arkansas	416
3	Lipscomb	370
4	Eastern Kentucky	368 (2)
5	Stetson	308
6	North Alabama	240
7	Jacksonville	238
8	Bellarmine	216
9	Austin Peay	172
10	West Georgia	146
11	North Florida	88
12	Queens	84
(#) first-place votes

=== Preseason All-ASUN Team ===
Preseason All-ASUN Team
Player	Year	Position
Molly Heard	Senior	Guard

== Roster ==
2025–26 Lipscomb Bisons women's basketball team
Players
Coaches

Pos.	#	Name	Height	Year	Previous school	Hometown
G	2	Elena Bertrand	5 ft 5 in (1.65 m)	Jr	Virginia Academy	Bristow, Virginia
G	3	Molly Heard	6 ft 0 in (1.83 m)	Sr	Pisgah High School	Pisgah, Alabama
G	11	McKayla Miller	6 ft 1 in (1.85 m)	Jr	Tulsa	Cimarron, Kansas
G	13	Maris Zurliene	6 ft 1 in (1.85 m)	Fr	Mater Dei Catholic High School	Aviston, Illinois
G	14	Tess Wiczek	5 ft 7 in (1.7 m)	Fr	Pius XI High School	Greenfield, Wisconsin
G	15	Taylor Holt	6 ft 2 in (1.88 m)	RS Fr	East Hickman High School	Lyles, Tennessee
G	21	Olivia Vinson	5 ft 10 in (1.78 m)	Fr	Coffee County Central High School	Manchester, Tennessee
G	22	Addison Melton	5 ft 11 in (1.8 m)	So	Central Magnet School	Murfreesboro, Tennessee
G	24	Hope Counts	6 ft 2 in (1.88 m)	Fr	Providence Academy	Crystal, Minnesota
G	32	Taylor Bowen	6 ft 0 in (1.83 m)	Sr	Culver Academies	Carmel, Indiana
G	33	Hannah Richardson	6 ft 1 in (1.85 m)	So	St. Bonaventure	Auckland, New Zealand

Head coach

- Lauren Sumski (Rhodes)

Assistant coach(es)

- Chris Sumski (St. Andrews)
- Sydney Shelton (Lipscomb)
- Jacob Ogle (Lipscomb)

Legend

- (C) Team captain
- (S) Suspended
- (I) Ineligible
- (W) Walk-on
- Injured
- Current redshirt

Roster
Last update: February 27, 2026

== Schedule and results ==
Date time, TV	Rank^{#}	Opponent^{#}	Result	Record	Site (attendance) city, state
Non-conference regular season
November 4, 2025*; 6:00 pm, B1G+		at Indiana	L 46–80	0–1	Simon Skjodt Assembly Hall (7,503); Bloomington, IN
November 6, 2025*; 2:00 pm, ESPN+		Sewanee	W 105–46	1–1	Allen Arena (637); Nashville, TN
November 9, 2025*; 2:00 pm, ESPN+		Chattanooga	L 56–59	1–2	Allen Arena (757); Nashville, TN
November 13, 2025*; 6:00 pm, ESPN+		Johnson	W 74–49	2–2	Allen Arena (717); Nashville, TN
November 16, 2025*; 4:00 pm		at Mississippi Valley State	L 68−72	2−3	Harrison HPER Complex (181); Itta Bena, MS
November 19, 2025*; 6:00 pm, ESPN+		at Belmont; Battle of the Boulevard	L 60−80	2−4	Curb Event Center (4,132); Nashville, TN
December 1, 2025*; 6:00 pm, ESPN+		at Tennessee Tech	L 55–68	2–5	Hooper Eblen Center (597); Cookeville, TN
December 4, 2025*; 6:00 pm, ESPN+		UT Martin	L 60–63	2–6	Allen Arena (447); Nashville, TN
December 7, 2025*; 1:00 pm, ESPN+		Tennessee State	W 63–55	3–6	Allen Arena; Nashville, TN
December 11, 2025*; 10:00 am, B1G+		at Purdue	L 45–88	3–7	Mackey Arena (5,331); West Lafayette, IN
December 18, 2025*; 5:30 pm, ESPN+		at Samford	L 59–65	3–8	Pete Hanna Center (417); Homewood, AL
ASUN regular season
January 1, 2026; 1:00 pm, ESPN+		at North Florida	W 67−65	4−8 (1–0)	UNF Arena (599); Jacksonville, FL
January 3, 2026; 1:00 pm, ESPN+		at Jacksonville	L 59–72	4–9 (1–1)	Swisher Gymnasium (242); Jacksonville, FL
January 8, 2026; 6:00 pm, ESPN+		Stetson	W 67–53	5–9 (2–1)	Allen Arena (486); Nashville, TN
January 10, 2026; 1:00 pm, ESPN+		Florida Gulf Coast	L 42–63	5–10 (2–2)	Allen Arena (505); Nashville, TN
January 15, 2026; 5:30 pm, ESPN+		at Eastern Kentucky	L 60–69	5–11 (2–3)	Baptist Health Arena (337); Richmond, KY
January 17, 2026; 2:00 pm, ESPN+		at Austin Peay	W 51–45	6–11 (3–3)	F&M Bank Arena (678); Clarksville, TN
January 22, 2026; 10:00 am, ESPN+		at Stetson	L 60–66	6–12 (3–4)	Insight Credit Union Arena (726); DeLand, FL
January 24, 2026; 11:00 am, ESPN+		at Florida Gulf Coast	W 53–44	7–12 (4–4)	Alico Arena (2,063); Fort Myers, FL
January 29, 2026; 6:00 pm, ESPN+		Jacksonville	L 54–72	7–13 (4–5)	Allen Arena (449); Nashville, TN
January 31, 2026; 1:00 pm, ESPN+		North Florida	W 73–65	8–13 (5–5)	Allen Arena (457); Nashville, TN
February 4, 2026; 6:00 pm, ESPN+		Eastern Kentucky	L 55–61	8–14 (5–6)	Allen Arena (794); Nashville, TN
February 7, 2026; 1:00 pm, ESPN+		at Central Arkansas	L 47–60	8–15 (5–7)	Farris Center (711); Conway, AR
February 12, 2026; 5:30 pm, ESPN+		at Bellarmine	W 74–44	9–15 (6–7)	Knights Hall (321); Louisville, KY
February 14, 2026; 1:00 pm, ESPN+		Queens	L 66–70	9–16 (6–8)	Allen Arena (477); Nashville, TN
February 18, 2026; 6:00 pm, ESPN+		West Georgia	L 65–66 ^{OT}	9–17 (6–9)	Allen Arena (440); Nashville, TN
February 21, 2026; 6:00 pm, ESPN+		at North Alabama	L 63–68	9–18 (6–10)	CB&S Bank Arena (1,401); Florence, AL
February 25, 2026; 6:00 pm, ESPN+		Bellarmine	W 87–42	10–18 (7–10)	Allen Arena (307); Nashville, TN
February 27, 2026; 6:00 pm, ESPN+		Austin Peay	L 43–48	10–19 (7–11)	Allen Arena (511); Nashville, TN
ASUN tournament
March 3, 2026; 11:00 am, ESPN+	(9)	vs. (8) Austin Peay; First Round	L 56-63	10-20	UNF Arena; Jacksonville, FL
*Non-conference game. ^{#}Rankings from AP Poll. (#) Tournament seedings in parentheses. All times are in Central.
