= Jacksonville Dolphins women's basketball =

2025–26 Jacksonville Dolphins women's basketball team
- University: Jacksonville University
- Head coach: Special Jennings (3rd season)
- Location: Jacksonville, Florida
- Arena: Swisher Gymnasium (capacity: 1,100)
- Conference: Atlantic Sun
- Nickname: Dolphins
- Colors: Green and white

NCAA Division I tournament appearances
- 2016, 2026

Conference tournament champions
- 2016, 2026

The Jacksonville Dolphins women's basketball team represents Jacksonville University in women's college basketball. The Dolphins compete in the ASUN Conference, and play their home games at the Swisher Gymnasium on campus of Jacksonville University.

== History ==
The Dolphins began play in 1999. In the 2015–16 season, the Dolphins won their first ever conference tournament, beating regular season champ Florida Gulf Coast 56–54. In the First Round in the NCAA Tournament, they lost 77–41 to South Carolina.

== Postseason ==
=== NCAA tournament results ===
The Dolphins have appeared in the NCAA tournament twice. Their record is 0–2.

Year	Seed	Round	Opponent	Result
2016	#16	First Round	#1 South Carolina	L 41–77
2026	#15	First Round	#2 LSU	L 58–116
