= 2026 ASUN women's basketball tournament =

American college basketball postseason tournament

- Classification: Division I
- Season: 2025–26
- Teams: 12
- Site: UNF Arena/Swisher Gymnasium; VyStar Veterans Memorial Arena; Jacksonville, Florida
- Champions: Jacksonville (2nd title)
- Winning coach: Special Jennings (1st title)
- Television: ESPN+, ESPNU

2025–26 ASUN women's basketball standings
| | Conf. | | | | Overall |
| Team | W | | L | PCT | W | | L | PCT |
|---|---|---|---|---|---|---|---|---|
| Eastern Kentucky | 15 | – | 3 | .833 | 24 | – | 8 | .750 |
| Jacksonville † | 13 | – | 5 | .722 | 24 | – | 8 | .750 |
| Central Arkansas | 13 | – | 5 | .722 | 21 | – | 11 | .656 |
| Stetson | 12 | – | 6 | .667 | 20 | – | 11 | .645 |
| Florida Gulf Coast | 11 | – | 7 | .611 | 16 | – | 15 | .516 |
| North Alabama | 11 | – | 7 | .611 | 17 | – | 14 | .548 |
| West Georgia* | 10 | – | 8 | .556 | 18 | – | 13 | .581 |
| Austin Peay | 8 | – | 10 | .444 | 19 | – | 13 | .594 |
| Lipscomb | 7 | – | 11 | .389 | 10 | – | 20 | .333 |
| North Florida | 4 | – | 14 | .222 | 9 | – | 21 | .300 |
| Queens | 4 | – | 14 | .222 | 10 | – | 20 | .333 |
| Bellarmine | 0 | – | 18 | .000 | 2 | – | 30 | .063 |
† 2026 ASUN tournament winner * ineligible for the 2026 NCAA tournament due to transition from Division II; As of March 9, 2026

The 2026 Atlantic Sun women's basketball tournament was the conference postseason tournament for the Atlantic Sun Conference (ASUN). The tournament was the 47th year the league has conducted a postseason tournament. The tournament was held March 3-9, 2026; first-round games were played at UNF Arena and Swisher Gymnasium, with all remaining games being played at VyStar Veterans Memorial Arena in Jacksonville, Florida, for the first time in league history. The Jacksonville Dolphins won the tournament, their second title, and received an automatic bid to the 2026 NCAA Tournament.

== Seeds ==
All 12 members of the conference will participate in the tournament. The top four seeds will earn a bye to the quarterfinals.

The tiebreakers used by the ASUN are as follows: 1) head-to-head record of teams with identical record, 2) comparing tied teams' win percentage against other teams in the conference, starting from the top team and descending until an advantage is gained, and 3) NCAA NET Rankings available on day following the conclusion of ASUN regular season play.

| Seed | School | Conference | Tiebreaker 1 | Tiebreaker 2 |
|---|---|---|---|---|
| 1 | Eastern Kentucky | 15–3 | | |
| 2 | Jacksonville | 13–5 | 1–0 vs. Central Arkansas | |
| 3 | Central Arkansas | 13–5 | 0–1 vs. Jacksonville | |
| 4 | Stetson | 12–6 | | |
| 5 | Florida Gulf Coast | 11–7 | 1–1 vs. North Alabama | 172 NET |
| 6 | North Alabama | 11–7 | 1–1 vs. Florida Gulf Coast | 231 NET |
| 7 | West Georgia | 10–8 | | |
| 8 | Austin Peay | 8–10 | | |
| 9 | Lipscomb | 7–11 | | |
| 10 | North Florida | 4–14 | 2–0 vs. Queens | |
| 11 | Queens | 4–14 | 0–2 vs. North Florida | |
| 12 | Bellarmine | 0–18 | | |

== Schedule ==
| Game | Time | Matchup | Score | Television |
First round – Tuesday, March 3 – UNF Arena/Swisher Gymnasium
| 1 | 12:00 p.m. | No. 8 Austin Peay vs. No. 9 Lipscomb | 63–56 | ESPN+ |
| 2 | 2:30 p.m. | No. 5 Florida Gulf Coast vs. No. 12 Bellarmine | 94–28 | ESPN+ |
| 3 | 5:00 p.m. | No. 7 West Georgia vs. No. 10 North Florida | 76–71 ^{OT} | ESPN+ |
| 4 | 7:30 p.m. | No. 6 North Alabama vs. No. 11 Queens | 57–55 | ESPN+ |
Quarterfinals – Thursday, March 5
| 5 | 12:00 p.m. | No. 1 Eastern Kentucky vs. No. 8 Austin Peay | 41–45 | ESPN+ |
| 6 | 2:30 p.m. | No. 4 Stetson vs. No. 5 Florida Gulf Coast | 70–63 | ESPN+ |
| 7 | 5:00 p.m. | No. 2 Jacksonville vs. No. 7 West Georgia | 86–77 | ESPN+ |
| 8 | 7:30 p.m. | No. 3 Central Arkansas vs. No. 6 North Alabama | 67–56 | ESPN+ |
Semifinals – Saturday, March 7
| 9 | 11:00 a.m. | No. 4 Stetson vs. No. 8 Austin Peay | 52–68 | ESPN+ |
| 10 | 1:30 p.m. | No. 2 Jacksonville vs. No. 3 Central Arkansas | 67–58 | ESPN+ |
Championship – Monday, March 9
| 11 | 5:00 p.m. | No. 8 Austin Peay vs. No. 2 Jacksonville | 63–66^{OT} | ESPNU |
Game times in ET. Rankings denote tournament seed

== Bracket ==
First round Tuesday, March 3
8 | Austin Peay | 63
9 | Lipscomb | 56
5 | Florida Gulf Coast | 94
12 | Bellarmine | 28
7 | West Georgia | 76*
10 | North Florida | 71
6 | North Alabama | 57
11 | Queens | 55

Quarterfinals; Thursday, March 5
1 | Eastern Kentucky | 41
8 | Austin Peay | 45
4 | Stetson | 70
5 | Florida Gulf Coast | 63
2 | Jacksonville | 86
7 | West Georgia | 77
3 | Central Arkansas | 67
6 | North Alabama | 56

Semifinals; Saturday, March 7
8 | Austin Peay | 68
4 | Stetson | 52
2 | Jacksonville | 67
3 | Central Arkansas | 58

Championship; Monday, March 9
8 | Austin Peay | 63
2 | Jacksonville | 66*

* denotes overtime period
