= 2025–26 Austin Peay Governors women's basketball team =

American college basketball season

2025–26 Austin Peay Governors women's basketball

WNIT, First Round
- Conference: Atlantic Sun Conference
- Record: 19–14 (8–10 ASUN)
- Head coach: Brittany Young (5th season)
- Assistant coaches: Peggy Knight; Victoria Morris
- Home arena: F&M Bank Arena

2025–26 ASUN women's basketball standings
	Conf.				Overall
Team	W		L	PCT	W		L	PCT
Eastern Kentucky	15	–	3	.833	25	–	9	.735
Jacksonville †	13	–	5	.722	24	–	9	.727
Central Arkansas	13	–	5	.722	21	–	11	.656
Stetson	12	–	6	.667	20	–	12	.625
Florida Gulf Coast	11	–	7	.611	16	–	16	.500
North Alabama	11	–	7	.611	17	–	14	.548
West Georgia*	10	–	8	.556	18	–	13	.581
Austin Peay	8	–	10	.444	19	–	14	.576
Lipscomb	7	–	11	.389	10	–	20	.333
North Florida	4	–	14	.222	9	–	21	.300
Queens	4	–	14	.222	10	–	20	.333
Bellarmine	0	–	18	.000	2	–	30	.063
† 2026 ASUN tournament winner * ineligible for the 2026 NCAA tournament due to transition from Division II

The 2025–26 Austin Peay Governors women's basketball team represents Austin Peay State University during the 2025–26 NCAA Division I women's basketball season. The Governors, led by fifth-year head coach Brittany Young, play their home games at the F&M Bank Arena in Clarksville, Tennessee, as members of the Atlantic Sun Conference.

== Previous season ==
The Governors finished the 2024–25 season 13–18, 7–11 in ASUN play, to finish in a tie for ninth place. They defeated West Georgia, before falling to top-seeded and eventual tournament champions Florida Gulf Coast in the quarterfinals of the ASUN tournament.

== Preseason ==
On October 17, 2025, the Atlantic Sun Conference released their preseason coaches and media polls. Austin Peay was picked to finish eighth in the coaches poll, and ninth in the media poll.

=== Preseason rankings ===
ASUN Preseason Coaches' Poll
Place	Team	Votes
1	Florida Gulf Coast	128 (6)
2	Central Arkansas	124 (3)
3	Stetson	118 (1)
4	Lipscomb	98
5	Eastern Kentucky	97 (1)
6	North Alabama	77
7	Jacksonville	73
8	Austin Peay	61
9	Bellarmine	49
10	West Georgia	48
11	Queens	37 (1)
12	North Florida	26
(#) first-place votes

ASUN Preseason Media Poll
Place	Team	Votes
1	Florida Gulf Coast	474 (36)
2	Central Arkansas	416
3	Lipscomb	370
4	Eastern Kentucky	368 (2)
5	Stetson	308
6	North Alabama	240
7	Jacksonville	238
8	Bellarmine	216
9	Austin Peay	172
10	West Georgia	146
11	North Florida	88
12	Queens	84
(#) first-place votes

=== Preseason All-ASUN Team ===
Preseason All-ASUN Team
Player	Year	Position
Anovia Sheals^	Sophomore	Guard
(^) unanimous selection

== Roster ==
2025–26 Austin Peay Governors women's basketball team
Players
Coaches

Pos.	#	Name	Height	Year	Previous school	Hometown
G	1	Jade Rucker	5 ft 11 in (1.8 m)	Fr	Tupelo High School	Tupelo, Mississippi
G	2	Kyra Perkins	5 ft 10 in (1.78 m)	Jr	Walters State Community College	Morrison, Tennessee
G	3	Veronaye Charlton	5 ft 4 in (1.63 m)	Jr	North Alabama	Nassau, Bahamas
G	4	Anovia Sheals	5 ft 11 in (1.8 m)	So	Mainland High School	Daytona Beach, Florida
G	11	JaNiah Newell	5 ft 6 in (1.68 m)	GS	Chicago State	Danville, Illinois
G	12	Jim'Miyah Branton	5 ft 7 in (1.7 m)	Fr	Slam Academy	Miami, Florida
G	15	Mya Williams	5 ft 8 in (1.73 m)	GS	Georgia State	Waxahachie, Texas
F	21	McKenzie Neal	6 ft 1 in (1.85 m)	Fr	Bayonne High School	Okeechobee, Florida
F	22	Jeanine Brandsma	6 ft 2 in (1.88 m)	RS Sr	LIU	Éguzon-Chantôme, France
F	23	Maeva Fotsa	6 ft 2 in (1.88 m)	Sr	George Washington	Quebec City, Quebec
G	24	Ines Gnahore	5 ft 9 in (1.75 m)	Sr	UC Irvine	Orléans, France
F	34	Lameria Thomas	6 ft 0 in (1.83 m)	Jr	Shelton State Community College	Montgomery, Alabama

Head coach

- Brittany Young (Francis Marion)

Assistant coach(es)

- Peggy Knight (Appalachian State)
- Victoria Morris (Rutgers)

Legend

- (C) Team captain
- (S) Suspended
- (I) Ineligible
- (W) Walk-on
- Injured
- Current redshirt

Roster
Last update: February 26, 2026

== Schedule and results ==
Date time, TV	Rank^{#}	Opponent^{#}	Result	Record	Site (attendance) city, state
Non-conference regular season
November 3, 2025*; 5:00 pm, ESPN+		Sewanee	W 115–46	1–0	F&M Bank Arena (867); Clarksville, TN
November 12, 2025*; 6:00 pm, ESPN+		No. 19 Vanderbilt	L 65–75	1–1	F&M Bank Arena (1,178); Clarksville, TN
November 16, 2025*; 1:00 pm, ESPN+		Indiana State	W 77–73	2–1	F&M Bank Arena (536); Clarksville, TN
November 20, 2025*; 5:00 pm, ESPN+		at Chattanooga	W 68–54	3–1	McKenzie Arena (1,272); Chattanooga, TN
November 23, 2025*; 2:00 pm, ESPN+		at Southern Illinois	Cancelled		Banterra Center; Carbondale, IL
November 29, 2025*; 2:00 pm, SLN		at Kansas City	W 66−46	4−1	Swinney Recreation Center (259); Kansas City, MO
December 6, 2025*; 2:00 pm, ESPN+		Murray State	L 56−74	4−2	F&M Bank Arena (681); Clarksville, TN
December 14, 2025*; 3:00 pm, ESPN+		at Evansville	W 63–57	5–2	Meeks Family Fieldhouse (215); Evansville, IN
December 20, 2025*; 12:00 pm, ESPN+		at UIC	W 59–48	6–2	Credit Union 1 Arena (405); Chicago, IL
December 22, 2025*; 2:00 pm, ESPN+		at Loyola Chicago	W 57–47	7–2	Joseph J. Gentile Arena (390); Chicago, IL
December 28, 2025*; 2:00 pm, ESPN+		Berry	W 73–38	8–2	F&M Bank Arena (856); Clarksville, TN
ASUN regular season
January 1, 2026; 5:30 pm, ESPN+		at Jacksonville	W 71–65	9–2 (1–0)	Swisher Gymnasium (127); Jacksonville, FL
January 3, 2026; 1:00 pm, ESPN+		at North Florida	W 80−55	10−2 (2–0)	UNF Arena (626); Jacksonville, FL
January 8, 2026; 6:00 pm, ESPN+		Florida Gulf Coast	L 54–58	10–3 (2–1)	F&M Bank Arena (437); Clarksville, TN
January 10, 2026; 2:00 pm, ESPN+		Stetson	L 53–56	10–4 (2–2)	F&M Bank Arena (717); Clarksville, TN
January 15, 2026; 5:30 pm, ESPN+		at Bellarmine	W 67–39	11–4 (3–2)	Knights Hall (302); Louisville, KY
January 17, 2026; 2:00 pm, ESPN+		Lipscomb	L 45–51	11–5 (3–3)	F&M Bank Arena (678); Clarksville, TN
January 22, 2026; 6:00 pm, ESPN+		at Florida Gulf Coast	W 74–66	12–5 (4–3)	Alico Arena (1,427); Fort Myers, FL
January 24, 2026; 1:00 pm, ESPN+		at Stetson	W 86–81	13–5 (5–3)	Insight Credit Union Arena (618); DeLand, FL
January 29, 2026; 6:00 pm, ESPN+		North Florida	L 66–69	13–6 (5–4)	F&M Bank Arena (367); Clarksville, TN
January 31, 2026; 2:00 pm, ESPN+		Jacksonville	L 68–70	13–7 (5–5)	F&M Bank Arena (736); Clarksville, TN
February 4, 2026; 6:00 pm, ESPN+		at North Alabama	L 50–55	13–8 (5–6)	CB&S Bank Arena (1,246); Florence, AL
February 7, 2026; 12:00 pm, ESPN+		at Eastern Kentucky	L 60–67	13–9 (5–7)	Baptist Health Arena (630); Richmond, KY
February 12, 2026; 6:00 pm, ESPN+		Queens	W 85–47	14–9 (6–7)	F&M Bank Arena (449); Clarksville, TN
February 14, 2026; 2:00 pm, ESPN+		West Georgia	L 74–95	14–10 (6–8)	F&M Bank Arena (947); Clarksville, TN
February 18, 2026; 6:30 pm, ESPN+		at Central Arkansas	L 63–67	14–11 (6–9)	Farris Center (684); Conway, AR
February 21, 2026; 2:00 pm, ESPN+		Bellarmine	W 82–41	15–11 (7–9)	F&M Bank Arena (414); Clarksville, TN
February 25, 2026; 5:00 pm, ESPN+		Eastern Kentucky	L 54–67	15–12 (7–10)	F&M Bank Arena; Clarksville, TN
February 27, 2026; 6:00 pm, ESPN+		at Lipscomb	W 48–43	16–12 (8–10)	Allen Arena (511); Nashville, TN
ASUN tournament
March 3, 2026; 11:00 am, ESPN+	(8)	vs. (9) Lipscomb; First Round	W 63–56	17–12	UNF Arena; Jacksonville, FL
March 5, 2026; 11:00 am, ESPN+	(8)	vs. (1) Eastern Kentucky; Quarterfinal	W 45–41	18–12	VyStar Veterans Memorial Arena; Jacksonville, FL
March 7, 2026; 10:00 am, ESPN+	(8)	vs. (4) Stetson; Semifinal	W 68–52	19–12	VyStar Veterans Memorial Arena; Jacksonville, FL
March 9, 2026; 4:00 pm, ESPNU	(8)	vs. (2) Jacksonville; Championship	L 63–66 ^{OT}	19–13	VyStar Veterans Memorial Arena; Jacksonville, FL
WNIT
March 19, 2026*; 6:00 pm, ESPN+		UT Rio Grande Valley; First round	L 59–71	19–14	F&M Bank Arena; Clarksville, TN
*Non-conference game. ^{#}Rankings from AP Poll. (#) Tournament seedings in parentheses. All times are in Central.
