= North Florida Ospreys women's basketball =

North Florida Ospreys
2025–26 North Florida Ospreys women's basketball team
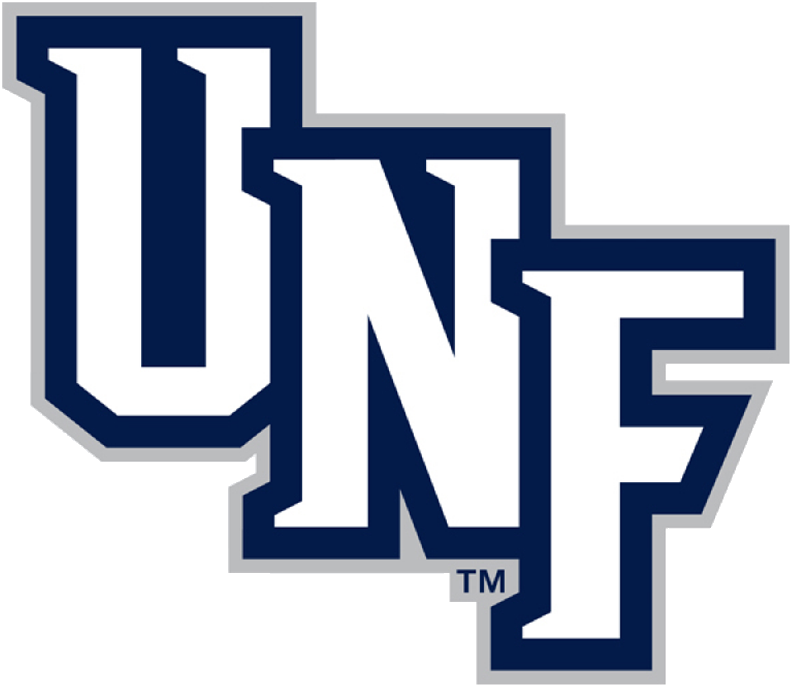
- University: University of North Florida
- Head coach: Erika Lambert (2nd season)
- Location: Jacksonville, Florida
- Arena: UNF Arena (capacity: 5,800)
- Conference: Atlantic Sun
- Nickname: Ospreys
- Colors: Navy blue and gray

NCAA Division I tournament Elite Eight
- 2003*
Other NCAA Division I tournament results
Sweet Sixteen	2003*
Appearances	2003*, 2004*

Uniforms
Home	Away	Alternate
- * at Division II level

The North Florida Ospreys women's basketball team represent the University of North Florida (UNF) in women's college basketball. The Ospreys compete in the ASUN Conference (Atlantic Sun) in Division I of the National Collegiate Athletic Association (NCAA).

== History ==
North Florida began play in 1992. As of the end of the 2015–16 season, the Ospreys have an all-time record of 319–373. They have never made the Division I Tournament, but they made the Division II Tournament in 2003 and 2004. They played in the Peach Belt Conference (Division II) from 1997 to 2005. From its inception until 2015, Mary Tappmeyer coached the team until her contract was not renewed, and she sued the school for sex-discrimination and citing retaliation for complaints. The two parties settled for $1.25 million.

== Postseason ==
=== NCAA Division II tournament results ===
The Ospreys made two appearances in the NCAA Division II women's basketball tournament. They had a combined record of 3–2.

Year	Round	Opponent	Result
2003	First round Regional semifinals Regional Finals; Elite Eight	Armstrong Atlantic State; Columbus State; Shaw; California (PA)	W, 65–64; W, 57–56; W, 71–58; L, 62–76
2004	First round	Armstrong Atlantic State	L, 68–75
