= Curry Arena =

Arena at Queens University of Charlotte

- Interactive map of Curry Arena
- Location: 2201 Wellesley Ave, Charlotte, NC
- Coordinates: 35°11′20″N 80°50′07″W
- Capacity: 2,500

Tenants
- Queens Royals (basketball, volleyball, wrestling)

Curry Arena is a 2,500-seat multi-purpose arena in Charlotte, North Carolina, United States. It is located inside the Levine Center near the campus of Queens University. The arena is home to the Queens Royals men's basketball, women's basketball, and women's volleyball teams.

== See also ==
- List of NCAA Division I basketball arenas
