= 2024–25 Austin Peay Governors women's basketball team =

American college basketball season

2024–25 Austin Peay Governors women's basketball
- Conference: Atlantic Sun Conference
- Record: 12–17 (7–11 ASUN)
- Head coach: Brittany Young (4th season)
- Associate head coach: David Lowery
- Assistant coaches: Peggy Knight; Victoria Morris; Ieasia Walker
- Home arena: F&M Bank Arena

2024–25 ASUN women's basketball standings
| | Conf. | | | | Overall |
| Team | W | | L | PCT | W | | L | PCT |
|---|---|---|---|---|---|---|---|---|
| Florida Gulf Coast † | 18 | – | 0 | 1.000 | 30 | – | 4 | .882 |
| Central Arkansas | 15 | – | 3 | .833 | 23 | – | 10 | .697 |
| Lipscomb | 12 | – | 6 | .667 | 20 | – | 12 | .625 |
| Eastern Kentucky | 10 | – | 8 | .556 | 21 | – | 12 | .636 |
| Stetson | 10 | – | 8 | .556 | 16 | – | 15 | .516 |
| North Alabama | 8 | – | 10 | .444 | 13 | – | 17 | .433 |
| Jacksonville | 8 | – | 10 | .444 | 14 | – | 17 | .452 |
| Bellarmine | 8 | – | 10 | .444 | 18 | – | 15 | .545 |
| West Georgia* | 7 | – | 11 | .389 | 13 | – | 17 | .433 |
| Austin Peay | 7 | – | 11 | .389 | 13 | – | 18 | .419 |
| Queens* | 4 | – | 14 | .222 | 10 | – | 19 | .345 |
| North Florida | 1 | – | 17 | .056 | 5 | – | 26 | .161 |
† 2025 ASUN tournament winner * ineligible for the 2025 NCAA tournament due to transition from Division II

The 2024–25 Austin Peay Governors women's basketball team represented Austin Peay State University during the 2024–25 NCAA Division I women's basketball season. The Governors, led by fourth-year head coach Brittany Young, played their home games at the F&M Bank Arena in Clarksville, Tennessee, as members of the Atlantic Sun Conference.

== Previous season ==
The Governors finished the 2023–24 season 17–16, 8–8 in ASUN play, to finish in a tie for sixth place. They would defeat Kennesaw State, and upset Stetson, before falling to eventual tournament champion Florida Gulf Coast in the semifinals of the ASUN tournament.

== Roster ==
2024–25 Austin Peay Governors women's basketball team
Players
Coaches

| Pos. | # | Name | Height | Year | Previous school | Hometown |
|---|---|---|---|---|---|---|
| G | 0 | Nisea Burrell | 5 ft 5 in (1.65 m) | Sr | Columbia State Community College | Philadelphia, Pennsylvania |
| G | 1 | Jordan Boddie | 5 ft 6 in (1.68 m) | So | Indian River State College | Sanford, Florida |
| G | 2 | Nariyah Simmons | 5 ft 2 in (1.57 m) | Sr | Kansas City | St. Louis, Missouri |
| G | 3 | Anala Nelson | 5 ft 7 in (1.7 m) | Jr | Lower Richland High School | Columbia, South Carolina |
| G | 4 | Anovia Sheals | 5 ft 10 in (1.78 m) | Fr | Mainland High School | Daytona Beach, Florida |
| G | 5 | Abby Cater | 5 ft 7 in (1.7 m) | Sr | Trinity Valley Community College | Fort Washington, Maryland |
| G | 10 | La'Nya Foster | 5 ft 9 in (1.75 m) | So | Lovejoy High School | Riverdale, Georgia |
| G | 11 | JaNiah Newell | 5 ft 5 in (1.65 m) | GS | Chicago State | Danville, Illinois |
| G | 15 | Briana Rivera | 5 ft 5 in (1.65 m) | Fr | Lake Highland Prep | Orlando, Florida |
| F | 20 | Sa'Mya Wyatt | 5 ft 11 in (1.8 m) | Fr | St. Francis School | Powder Springs, Georgia |
| G | 21 | Rose Azmoudeh | 5 ft 9 in (1.75 m) | Fr | Half Hollow Hills East High School | Dix Hills, New York |
| F | 22 | Jeanine Brandsma | 6 ft 1 in (1.85 m) | RS Jr | LIU | Éguzon-Chantôme, France |
| F | 34 | Jenny Ntambwe | 5 ft 11 in (1.8 m) | Jr | Northwestern State | Coon Rapids, Minnesota |

Head coach

- Brittany Young (Francis Marion)

Assistant coach(es)

- David Lowery (Mississippi State)
- Peggy Knight (Appalachian State)
- Victoria Morris (Rutgers)
- Ieasia Walker (South Carolina)

Legend

- (C) Team captain
- (S) Suspended
- (I) Ineligible
- (W) Walk-on
- Injured
- Current redshirt

Roster
Last update: January 9, 2025

== Schedule and results ==
| Date time, TV | Rank^{#} | Opponent^{#} | Result | Record | Site (attendance) city, state |
Exhibition
| October 30, 2024*; 11:00 am, ESPN+ | | Saint Mary-of-the-Woods | W 83–38 | – | F&M Bank Arena (517); Clarksville, TN |
Non-conference regular season
| November 4, 2024*; 5:00 pm, ESPN+ | | Bethel (TN) | L 52–64 | 0–1 | F&M Bank Arena (1,132); Clarksville, TN |
| November 8, 2024*; 6:30 pm, SECN+ | | at Vanderbilt | L 37–93 | 0–2 | Memorial Gymnasium (2,343); Nashville, TN |
| November 15, 2024*; 6:00 pm, ESPN+ | | at Indiana State | W 74–56 | 1–2 | Hulman Center (1,140); Terre Haute, IN |
| November 17, 2024*; 12:00 pm, ESPN+ | | at Miami (OH) | L 52–59 | 1–3 | Millett Hall (522); Oxford, OH |
| November 24, 2024*; 2:00 pm, ESPN+ | | Mercer | W 66–53 | 2–3 | F&M Bank Arena; Clarksville, TN |
| November 30, 2024*; 12:00 pm | | vs. Manhattan; FAU Thanksgiving Tournament | L 46–61 | 2–4 | Eleanor R. Baldwin Arena (264); Boca Raton, FL |
| December 1, 2024*; 1:00 pm, ESPN+ | | at Florida Atlantic; FAU Thanksgiving Tournament | W 59–58 | 3–4 | Eleanor R. Baldwin Arena (462); Boca Raton, FL |
| December 7, 2024*; 2:00 pm, ESPN+ | | at Murray State | L 80–116 | 3–5 | CFSB Center (1,126); Murray, KY |
| December 15, 2024*; 4:00 pm, ACCNX | | at California | L 45–71 | 3–6 | Haas Pavilion (1,428); Berkeley, CA |
| December 21, 2024*; 1:00 pm, ESPN+ | | at High Point | W 59–46 | 4–6 | Qubein Center (580); High Point, NC |
| December 28, 2024*; 4:00 pm, ESPN+ | | UT Southern | W 73–66 | 5–6 | F&M Bank Arena (372); Clarksville, TN |
ASUN regular season
| January 2, 2025; 6:00 pm, ESPN+ | | Eastern Kentucky | L 58–72 | 5–7 (0–1) | F&M Bank Arena (382); Clarksville, TN |
| January 4, 2025; 2:00 pm, ESPN+ | | North Florida | W 60–52 | 6–7 (1–1) | F&M Bank Arena (687); Clarksville, TN |
| January 8, 2025; 6:00 pm, ESPN+ | | at North Alabama | W 75–57 | 7–7 (2–1) | CB&S Bank Arena (1,114); Florence, AL |
| January 11, 2025; 1:00 pm, ESPN+ | | at Bellarmine | W 69-58 | 8-7 (3-1) | Knights Hall (483); Louisville, KY |
| January 16, 2025; 6:00 pm, ESPN+ | | at Eastern Kentucky | W 59-57 OT | 9-7 (4-1) | Baptist Health Arena (203); Richmond, KY |
| January 18, 2025; 4:00 pm, ESPN+ | | Jacksonville | L 61-65 | 9-8 (4-2) | F&M Bank Arena (388); Clarksville, TN |
| January 23, 2025; 6:00 pm, ESPN+ | | North Alabama | W 71-60 | 10-8 (5-2) | F&M Bank Arena (408); Clarksville, TN |
| January 25, 2025; 2:00 pm, ESPN+ | | Central Arkansas | L 50-51 | 10-9 (5-3) | F&M Bank Arena (423); Clarksville, TN |
| January 30, 2025; 6:00 pm, ESPN+ | | at Stetson | L 63-79 | 10-10 (5-4) | Insight Credit Union Arena (768); DeLand, FL |
| February 1, 2025; 3:00 pm, ESPN+ | | at Florida Gulf Coast | L 35-45 | 10-11 (5-5) | Alico Arena (2,399); Fort Myers, FL |
| February 6, 2025; 6:00 pm, ESPN+ | | at Queens | L 43-52 | 10-12 (5-6) | Curry Arena (385); Charlotte, NC |
| February 8, 2025; 2:00 pm, ESPN+ | | Lipscomb | L 59-65 | 10-13 (5-7) | F&M Bank Arena (1,564); Clarksville, TN |
| February 12, 2025; 6:00 pm, ESPN+ | | at West Georgia | L 57-70 | 10-14 (5-8) | The Coliseum (383); Carrollton, GA |
| February 15, 2025; 1:00 pm, ESPN+ | | at Central Arkansas | L 67-77 | 10-15 (5-9) | Farris Center (738); Conway, AR |
| February 20, 2025; 6:00 pm, ESPN+ | | Queens | W 66-57 | 11-15 (6-9) | F&M Bank Arena (353); Clarksville, TN |
| February 22, 2025; 2:00 pm, ESPN+ | | at Lipscomb | L 64-66 | 11-16 (6-10) | Allen Arena (280); Nashville, TN |
| February 27, 2025; 6:00 pm, ESPN+ | | West Georgia | L 52-58 | 11-17 (6-11) | F&M Bank Arena (389); Clarksville, TN |
| March 1, 2025; 2:00 pm, ESPN+ | | Bellarmine | W 72-63 | 12-17 (7-11) | F&M Bank Arena (532); Clarksville, TN |
ASUN Tournament
| March 7, 2025; 5:00 pm, ESPN+ | (10) | vs. (9) West Georgia; First round | W 60–49 | 13–17 | Alico Arena (150); Fort Myers, Florida |
| March 8, 2025; 5:30 pm, ESPN+ | (10) | at (1) Florida Gulf Coast; Quarterfinals | L 48–82 | 13–18 | Alico Arena (1,556); Fort Myers, Florida |
*Non-conference game. ^{#}Rankings from AP Poll. (#) Tournament seedings in parentheses. All times are in Central.
