= 2024–25 North Alabama Lions women's basketball team =

American college basketball season

2024–25 North Alabama Lions women's basketball
- Conference: ASUN Conference
- Record: 13–16 (8–10 ASUN)
- Head coach: Candi Whitaker (1st season)
- Assistant coaches: Sandra Abston; Ty Margenthaler; Haley Troup
- Home arena: CB&S Bank Arena

2024–25 ASUN women's basketball standings
	Conf.				Overall
Team	W		L	PCT	W		L	PCT
Florida Gulf Coast †	18	–	0	1.000	30	–	4	.882
Central Arkansas	15	–	3	.833	23	–	10	.697
Lipscomb	12	–	6	.667	20	–	12	.625
Eastern Kentucky	10	–	8	.556	21	–	12	.636
Stetson	10	–	8	.556	16	–	15	.516
North Alabama	8	–	10	.444	13	–	17	.433
Jacksonville	8	–	10	.444	14	–	17	.452
Bellarmine	8	–	10	.444	18	–	15	.545
West Georgia*	7	–	11	.389	13	–	17	.433
Austin Peay	7	–	11	.389	13	–	18	.419
Queens*	4	–	14	.222	10	–	19	.345
North Florida	1	–	17	.056	5	–	26	.161
† 2025 ASUN tournament winner * ineligible for the 2025 NCAA tournament due to transition from Division II

The 2024–25 North Alabama Lions women's basketball team represent the University of North Alabama during the 2024–25 NCAA Division I women's basketball season. The Lions, led by first-year head coach Candi Whitaker, play their home games at the CB&S Bank Arena located in Florence, Alabama, as members of the Atlantic Sun Conference (ASUN).

== Previous season ==
The Lions finished the 2023–24 season 12–18, 8–8 in ASUN play, to finish in a tie for sixth place. As the number 6 seed in the ASUN tournament, they were defeated by number 3 seed Central Arkansas in the quarterfinals.

On March 11, following the tournament loss, the university announced that head coach Missy Tiber would not return as coach. Tiber had been the head coach for eleven seasons and compiled a 172–146 record.

On March 25, it was announced that Candi Whitaker would become the head coach. Whitaker had previously coached the Texas Tech Lady Raiders and the Missouri Western Griffons. In her five seasons at Missouri Western, she led the Griffons to a record of 100–47 and led the team to the Elite Eight in the 2022 NCAA Division II women's basketball tournament. Whitaker signed a four-year deal with the Lions that lasts through April 30, 2028.

== Roster ==
2024–25 North Alabama Lions women's basketball team
Players
Coaches

Pos.	#	Name	Height	Year	Previous school	Hometown
F	0	Cameron Jones	6 ft 2 in (1.88 m)	Jr	St. Vincent–St. Mary High School	Broadview Heights, OH
G	1	Emma Kate Tittle	5 ft 7 in (1.7 m)	Jr	Deshler High School	Tuscumbia, AL
F	2	Sofia Ceppellotti	6 ft 1 in (1.85 m)	Fr	APU Udine Delser	Ruda, Italy
F	3	Venla Ulander	6 ft 1 in (1.85 m)	Fr	HBA-Märsky	Espoo, Finland
G	5	Sara Wohlgemuth	5 ft 4 in (1.63 m)	GS	Florida Southern	Madison, CT
G	10	Charity Gallegos	5 ft 5 in (1.65 m)	Sr	Cal State San Marcos	Sacramento, CA
G	11	Veronaye Charlton	5 ft 4 in (1.63 m)	So	Norcross High School	Nassau, Bahamas
G	12	Sarang West	5 ft 8 in (1.73 m)	Jr	Allen CC	New York, NY
G	13	Katie Criswell	5 ft 10 in (1.78 m)	So	Lawrence County High School	Lawrence County, TN
F	20	Jazzy Klinge	5 ft 10 in (1.78 m)	Jr	Johnson County CC	Overland Park, KS
G	21	Rhema Pegues	5 ft 8 in (1.73 m)	Jr	Olive Branch High School	Olive Branch, MS
F	22	India Howard	6 ft 0 in (1.83 m)	Jr	Johnson C. Smith	Coppell, TX
G	23	Alyssa Clutter	5 ft 9 in (1.75 m)	Jr	Trinity High School	Washington, PA
G	24	Chloe Siegel	5 ft 7 in (1.7 m)	So	Deshler High School	Tuscumbia, AL
F/C	30	Chrishunti Walker	6 ft 2 in (1.88 m)	Fr	Rossville Christian Academy	Oakland, TN

Head coach

- Candi Whitaker (Texas Tech)

Assistant coach(es)

- Sandra Abston (George Mason)
- Ty Margenthaler (SIU Edwardsville)
- Haley Troup (Missouri)

Legend

- (C) Team captain
- (S) Suspended
- (I) Ineligible
- (W) Walk-on
- Injured
- Current redshirt

Roster
Last update: November 26, 2024

== Schedule and results ==
Date time, TV	Rank^{#}	Opponent^{#}	Result	Record	High points	High rebounds	High assists	Site (attendance) city, state
Non-conference regular season
November 4, 2024*; 6:00 p.m., ESPN+		at UT Martin	W 66–63	1–0	21 – Tittle	9 – Howard	5 – Gallegos	Kathleen and Tom Elam Center (1,103); Martin, TN
November 10, 2024*; 6:00 p.m., ESPN+		at Tennessee Tech	L 64–73	1–1	16 – Jones	8 – Jones	5 – Criswell	Eblen Center (546); Cookeville, TN
November 15, 2024*; 5:30 p.m., ESPN+		South Alabama	W 71–62	2–1	16 – Gallegos	8 – Howard	4 – Howard	CB&S Bank Arena (1,939); Florence, AL
November 17, 2024*; 2:00 p.m., ESPN+		at Kansas	L 64–81	2–2	17 – Criswell	5 – Criswell	4 – Clutter	Allen Fieldhouse (3,229); Lawrence, KS
November 19, 2024*; 7:00 p.m., B1G+		at No. 21 Nebraska	L 48–85	2–3	11 – Klinge	9 – Jones	3 – 3 tied	Pinnacle Bank Arena (4,414); Lincoln, NE
November 25, 2024*; 6:00 p.m., ESPN+		Cumberland	W 71–62	3–3	13 – Gallegos	12 – Howard	5 – 2 tied	CB&S Bank Arena (1,115); Florence, AL
December 1, 2024*; 3:00 p.m., YouTube		at Arkansas Pine–Bluff	W 62–48	4–3	14 – Clutter	14 – Clutter	4 – 2 tied	K. L. Johnson Complex (347); Pine Bluff, AR
December 5, 2024*; 6:00 p.m., ESPN+		Samford	L 61–67 ^{OT}	4–4	14 – Gallegos	11 – Howard	5 – Howard	CB&S Bank Arena (1,621); Florence, AL
December 17, 2024*; 6:00 p.m., ESPN+		Alabama A&M	L 77–80	4–5	13 – 2 tied	5 – 4 tied	9 – Gallegos	CB&S Bank Arena (1,176); Florence, AL
December 21, 2024*; 1:00 p.m., Summit League Network		at Denver	L 70–78	4–6	17 – Jones	7 – Gallegos	4 – Gallegos	Hamilton Gymnasium (217); Denver, CO
December 28, 2024*; 2:00 p.m., ESPN+		Bethel	W 84–54	5–6	25 – Gallegos	9 – Howard	7 – Gallegos	CB&S Bank Arena (1,147); Florence, AL
ASUN regular season
January 2, 2025; 5:30 p.m., ESPN+		at Bellarmine	W 90–89 ^{OT}	6–6 (1–0)	32 – Gallegos	17 – Clutter	5 – Clutter	Knights Hall (417); Louisville, KY
January 4, 2025; 1:00 p.m., ESPN+		Jacksonville	W 90–57	7–6 (2–0)	20 – Gallegos	14 – Howard	5 – Klinge	CB&S Bank Arena (1,414); Florence, AL
January 8, 2025; 6:00 p.m., ESPN+		Austin Peay	L 57–75	7–7 (2–1)	13 – Howard	8 – Howard	5 – Gallegos	CB&S Bank Arena (1,114); Florence, AL
January 11, 2025; 12:00 p.m., ESPN+		at Eastern Kentucky	L 58–94	7–8 (2–2)	11 – West	6 – 2 tied	3 – Klinge	Alumni Coliseum (213); Richmond, KY
January 16, 2025; 6:00 p.m., ESPN+		Stetson	W 75–57	8–8 (3–2)	21 – Clutter	17 – Howard	6 – Gallegos	CB&S Bank Arena (1,673); Florence, AL
January 18, 2025; 6:00 p.m., ESPN+		North Florida	W 65–54	9–8 (4–2)	16 – Wohlgemuth	11 – 2 tied	3 – 3 tied	CB&S Bank Arena (1,351); Florence, AL
January 23, 2025; 6:00 p.m., ESPN+		at Austin Peay	L 60–71	9–9 (4–3)	12 – Gallegos	5 – 2 tied	5 – Gallegos	F&M Bank Arena (408); Clarksville, TN
January 25, 2025; 2:00 p.m., ESPN+		at Lipscomb	L 76–85	9–10 (4–4)	21 – Criswell	9 – Clutter	4 – Wohlgemuth	Allen Arena (158); Nashville, TN
January 30, 2025; 6:00 p.m., ESPN+		Queens	W 87–62	10–10 (5–4)	20 – Gallegos	9 – Klinge	6 – Wohlgemuth	CB&S Bank Arena (1,381); Florence, AL
February 1, 2025; 5:30 p.m., ESPN+		West Georgia	W 82–73	11–10 (6–4)	19 – Gallegos	9 – Klinge	8 – Gallegos	CB&S Bank Arena (1,790); Florence, AL
February 6, 2025; 4:00 p.m., ESPN+		at North Florida	W 73–68	12–10 (7–4)	25 – Gallegos	12 – Howard	6 – Gallegos	UNF Arena (250); Jacksonville, FL
February 8, 2025; 1:00 p.m., ESPN+		at Jacksonville	L 61–78	12–11 (7–5)	14 – Howard	8 – Wohlgemuth	5 – Wohlgemuth	Swisher Gymnasium (250); DeLand, FL
February 12, 2025; 6:30 p.m., ESPN+		at Central Arkansas	L 52–73	12–12 (7–6)	13 – Criswell	6 – 2 tied	7 – Gallegos	Farris Center (647); Conway, AR
February 15, 2025; 1:00 p.m., ESPN+		at West Georgia	L 53-62	12–13 (7–7)	15 – Criswell	15 – Howard	3 – Howard	The Coliseum (276); Carrollton, GA
February 20, 2025; 6:00 p.m., ESPN+		Lipscomb	L 58-61	12–14 (7–8)	14 – 2 tied	7 – 2 tied	5 – Howard	CB&S Bank Arena (1,411); Florence, AL
February 22, 2025; 5:00 p.m., ESPN+		Florida Gulf Coast	L 50-60	12–15 (7–9)	16 – Gallwgos	10 – Klinge	4 – Gallegos	CB&S Bank Arena (1,618); Florence, AL
February 27, 2025; 6:00 p.m., ESPN+		at Queens	L 52-69	12–16 (7–10)	14 – Howard	7 – Howard	4 – Howard	Curry Arena (352); Charlotte, NC
March 1, 2025; 6:00 p.m., ESPN+		Central Arkansas	W 66-56	13–16 (8–10)	30 – Gallegos	11 – Howard	4 – Gallegos	CB&S Bank Arena (1,507); Florence, AL
ASUN tournament
March 8, 2025; 2:00 p.m., ESPN+	(6)	at (3) Lipscomb; Quarterfinals	L 64–73	13–17	19 – Gallegos	9 – Howard	4 – Wohlgemuth	Allen Arena (338); Nashville, TN
*Non-conference game. ^{#}Rankings from AP poll. (#) Tournament seedings in parentheses. All times are in Central.
