= 2024–25 Central Arkansas Sugar Bears basketball team =

American college basketball season

2024–25 Central Arkansas Sugar Bears basketball

WNIT, Second Round
- Conference: Atlantic Sun Conference
- Record: 23–10 (15–3 ASUN)
- Head coach: Tony Kemper (2nd season)
- Assistant coaches: Kaitlynn Pacholke; Tanaeya King; Hailey Estes
- Home arena: Farris Center

2024–25 ASUN women's basketball standings
	Conf.				Overall
Team	W		L	PCT	W		L	PCT
Florida Gulf Coast †	18	–	0	1.000	30	–	4	.882
Central Arkansas	15	–	3	.833	23	–	10	.697
Lipscomb	12	–	6	.667	20	–	12	.625
Eastern Kentucky	10	–	8	.556	21	–	12	.636
Stetson	10	–	8	.556	16	–	15	.516
North Alabama	8	–	10	.444	13	–	17	.433
Jacksonville	8	–	10	.444	14	–	17	.452
Bellarmine	8	–	10	.444	18	–	15	.545
West Georgia*	7	–	11	.389	13	–	17	.433
Austin Peay	7	–	11	.389	13	–	18	.419
Queens*	4	–	14	.222	10	–	19	.345
North Florida	1	–	17	.056	5	–	26	.161
† 2025 ASUN tournament winner * ineligible for the 2025 NCAA tournament due to transition from Division II

The 2024–25 Central Arkansas Sugar Bears basketball team represented the University of Central Arkansas during the 2024–25 NCAA Division I women's basketball season. The Sugar Bears, led by second-year head coach Tony Kemper, played their home games at the Farris Center in Conway, Arkansas, as members of the Atlantic Sun Conference.

== Previous season ==
The Sugar Bears finished the 2023–24 season 21–12, 11–5 in ASUN play, to finish in third place. They defeated North Alabama and Eastern Kentucky, before falling to Florida Gulf Coast in the ASUN tournament championship game. They received an at-large bid to the WNIT, where they lost to eventual tournament champions Saint Louis in the first round.

== Roster ==
2024–25 Central Arkansas Sugar Bears women's basketball team
Players
Coaches

Pos.	#	Name	Height	Year	Previous school	Hometown
G	0	Jade Upshaw	5 ft 7 in (1.7 m)	Sr	Arkansas State	Sapulpa, Oklahoma
G	1	Kinley Fisher	5 ft 7 in (1.7 m)	Sr	Mercer	Greenwood, Arkansas
G	3	Randrea Wright	5 ft 7 in (1.7 m)	Sr	George Washington Carver High School	Birmingham, Alabama
G	4	Cheyanne Kemp	5 ft 8 in (1.73 m)	So	Morrilton High School	Morrilton, Arkansas
F	5	Bree Stephens	6 ft 0 in (1.83 m)	Sr	Dodge City Community College	Townsville, Australia
G	6	Leah Mafua	5 ft 10 in (1.78 m)	Sr	Dodge City Community College	Wellington, New Zealand
G	10	Jenna Cook	5 ft 6 in (1.68 m)	Fr	Cabot High School	Cabot, Arkansas
F	12	Destine Duckworth	6 ft 0 in (1.83 m)	Jr	SIU Edwardsville	North Little Rock, Arkansas
F	21	Kamryn Griffin	5 ft 11 in (1.8 m)	Fr	Clark High School	San Antonio, Texas
G	23	Kaidyn Beckwith	5 ft 4 in (1.63 m)	So	Conway High School	Conway, Arkansas
F	32	Elizabeth Abiara	6 ft 2 in (1.88 m)	So	Lake Ridge High School	Mansfield, Texas
F	42	Cheyenne Banks	6 ft 4 in (1.93 m)	Sr	Coffeyville Community College	McLoud, Oklahoma

Head coach

- Tony Kemper (Fort Hays State)

Assistant coach(es)

- Kaitlynn Pacholke (Newberry)
- Tanaeya King (Utah)
- Hailey Estes (Henderson State)

Legend

- (C) Team captain
- (S) Suspended
- (I) Ineligible
- (W) Walk-on
- Injured
- Current redshirt

Roster
Last update: January 8, 2025

== Schedule and results ==
Date time, TV	Rank^{#}	Opponent^{#}	Result	Record	Site (attendance) city, state
Non-conference regular season
November 4, 2024*; 6:30 pm, ESPN+		Hendrix	W 104–30	1–0	Farris Center (376); Conway, AR
November 8, 2024*; 11:00 am, ESPN+		Samford	W 63–44	2–0	Farris Center (1,036); Conway, AR
November 16, 2024*; 7:00 pm, ESPN+		at UT Martin	W 87–67	3–0	Skyhawk Arena (1,103); Martin, TN
November 20, 2024*; 11:00 am, ESPN+		at Oklahoma State	L 58–89	3–1	Gallagher-Iba Arena (4,714); Stillwater, OK
November 25, 2024*; 6:30 pm, ESPN+		Central Baptist	W 120–47	4–1	Farris Center (837); Conway, AR
December 1, 2024*; 3:30 pm, ESPN+		at No. 9 Kansas State	L 39–86	4–2	Bramlage Coliseum (4,057); Manhattan, KS
December 7, 2024*; 1:00 pm, ESPN+		Little Rock	W 55–42	5–2	Farris Center (865); Conway, AR
December 14, 2024*; 1:00 pm, ESPN+		at Northwestern State	W 62–52	6–2	Prather Coliseum (343); Natchitoches, LA
December 20, 2024*; 12:00 pm		vs. Louisiana–Monroe; Tulane Holiday Tournament	L 49–65	6–3	Devlin Fieldhouse; New Orleans, LA
December 21, 2024*; 12:00 pm		vs. Alabama A&M; Tulane Holiday Tournament	L 53–55	6–4	Devlin Fieldhouse (535); New Orleans, LA
December 29, 2024*; 2:00 pm, ESPN+		at Arkansas	L 70–87	6–5	Bud Walton Arena (2,976); Fayetteville, AR
ASUN regular season
January 2, 2025; 5:00 pm, ESPN+		Jacksonville	W 74–63	7–5 (1–0)	Farris Center (673); Conway, AR
January 4, 2025; 1:00 pm, ESPN+		at Bellarmine	L 60–68	7–6 (1–1)	Knights Hall (372); Louisville, KY
January 8, 2025; 6:30 pm, ESPN+		Lipscomb	W 86–75	8–6 (2–1)	Farris Center (337); Conway, AR
January 12, 2025; 1:00 pm, ESPN+		at Queens	W 66-57	9-6 (3-1)	Curry Arena (282); Charlotte, NC
January 16, 2025; 6:30 pm, ESPN+		North Florida	W 67-53	10-6 (4-1)	Farris Center; Conway, AR
January 18, 2025; 1:00 pm, ESPN+		Stetson	W 85-64	11-6 (5-1)	Farris Center (574); Conway, AR
January 23, 2025; 5:00 pm, ESPN+		at Lipscomb	W 71-69	12-6 (6-1)	Allen Arena (195); Nashville, TN
January 25, 2025; 2:00 pm, ESPN+		at Austin Peay	W 51-50	13-6 (7-1)	F&M Bank Arena (423); Clarksville, TN
January 30, 2025; 6:00 pm, ESPN+		at West Georgia	W 67-64	14-6 (8-1)	The Coliseum (472); Carrollton, GA
February 1, 2025; 1:00 pm, ESPN+		Queens	W 68-50	15-6 (9-1)	Farris Center (567); Conway, AR
February 6, 2025; 5:30 pm, ESPN+		at Jacksonville	W 76-65	16-6 (10-1)	Swisher Gymnasium (250); Jacksonville, FL
February 8, 2025; 1:00 pm, ESPN+		at North Florida	W 72-59	17-6 (11-1)	UNF Arena (276); Jacksonville, FL
February 12, 2025; 6:30 pm, ESPN+		North Alabama	W 73-52	18-6 (12-1)	Farris Center (647); Conway, AR
February 15, 2025; 1:00 pm, ESPN+		Austin Peay	W 77-67	19-6 (13-1)	Farris Center (738); Conway, AR
February 20, 2025; 6:30 pm, ESPN+		Florida Gulf Coast	L 71-95	19-7 (13-2)	Farris Center (1,458); Conway, AR
February 22, 2025; 6:30 pm, ESPN+		West Georgia	W 72-62	20-7 (14-2)	Farris Center (687); Conway, AR
February 27, 2025; 6:00 pm, ESPN+		at Eastern Kentucky	W 63-59	21-7 (15-2)	Baptist Health Arena (397); Richmond, KY
March 1, 2025; 6:00 pm, ESPN+		at North Alabama	L 56-66	21-8 (15-3)	CB&S Bank Arena (1,507); Florence, AL
ASUN tournament
March 8, 2025; 6:30 pm, ESPN+	(2)	(8) Bellarmine; Quarterfinals	W 77–57	22–8	Farris Center (1,258); Conway, AR
March 11, 2025; 6:30 pm, ESPN+	(2)	(3) Lipscomb; Semifinals	W 70–65	23–8	Farris Center (1,369); Conway, AR
March 15, 2025; 1:00 pm, ESPN+	(2)	at (1) Florida Gulf Coast; Championship	L 51–68	23–9	Alico Arena (2,380); Fort Myers, FL
WNIT
March 24, 2025*; 6:30 pm		Abilene Christian; Second round	L 53–75	23–10	Farris Center; Conway, AR
*Non-conference game. ^{#}Rankings from AP Poll. (#) Tournament seedings in parentheses. All times are in Central.
