= 2024–25 Lipscomb Bisons women's basketball team =

American college basketball season

2024–25 Lipscomb Bisons women's basketball

WNIT, First Round
- Conference: Atlantic Sun Conference
- Record: 20–12 (12–6 ASUN)
- Head coach: Lauren Sumski (6th season)
- Associate head coach: Chris Sumski
- Assistant coaches: Sydney Shelton; Jacob Ogle
- Home arena: Allen Arena

2024–25 ASUN women's basketball standings
	Conf.				Overall
Team	W		L	PCT	W		L	PCT
Florida Gulf Coast †	18	–	0	1.000	30	–	4	.882
Central Arkansas	15	–	3	.833	23	–	10	.697
Lipscomb	12	–	6	.667	20	–	12	.625
Eastern Kentucky	10	–	8	.556	21	–	12	.636
Stetson	10	–	8	.556	16	–	15	.516
North Alabama	8	–	10	.444	13	–	17	.433
Jacksonville	8	–	10	.444	14	–	17	.452
Bellarmine	8	–	10	.444	18	–	15	.545
West Georgia*	7	–	11	.389	13	–	17	.433
Austin Peay	7	–	11	.389	13	–	18	.419
Queens*	4	–	14	.222	10	–	19	.345
North Florida	1	–	17	.056	5	–	26	.161
† 2025 ASUN tournament winner * ineligible for the 2025 NCAA tournament due to transition from Division II

The 2024–25 Lipscomb Bisons women's basketball team represented Lipscomb University during the 2024–25 NCAA Division I women's basketball season. The Bisons, led by sixth-year head coach Lauren Sumski, played their home games at the Allen Arena in Nashville, Tennessee, as members of the Atlantic Sun Conference.

== Previous season ==
The Bisons finished the 2023–24 season 17–13, 10–6 in ASUN play, to finish in fourth place. They were defeated by Eastern Kentucky in the quarterfinals of the ASUN tournament.

== Roster ==
2024–25 Lipscomb Bisons women's basketball team
Players
Coaches

Pos.	#	Name	Height	Year	Previous school	Hometown
G	0	Olivia Vandergriff	5 ft 7 in (1.7 m)	So	Guntersville High School	Guntersville, Alabama
G	1	Claira McGowan	5 ft 7 in (1.7 m)	Sr	Murray State	Murfreesboro, Tennessee
G	2	Elena Bertrand	5 ft 5 in (1.65 m)	So	Virginia Academy	Bristow, Virginia
G	3	Molly Heard	6 ft 0 in (1.83 m)	Jr	Pisgah High School	Pisgah, Alabama
G	14	Ainhoa Cea	5 ft 6 in (1.68 m)	Jr	DME Academy	Hondarribia, Spain
F	15	Taylor Holt	6 ft 2 in (1.88 m)	Fr	East Hickman High School	Lyles, Tennessee
G/F	21	Bella Vinson	6 ft 2 in (1.88 m)	Sr	Coffee County High School	Manchester, Tennessee
G	22	Addison Melton	5 ft 11 in (1.8 m)	Fr	Central Magnet School	Murfreesboro, Tennessee
G	23	Jalyn Holcomb	5 ft 9 in (1.75 m)	GS	Riverdale High School	Murfreesboro, Tennessee
F	31	Isabella Pitta	6 ft 3 in (1.91 m)	So	Lake Mills High School	Lake Mills, Wisconsin
F	32	Taylor Bowen	6 ft 0 in (1.83 m)	Jr	Culver Academies	Carmel, Indiana

Head coach

- Lauren Sumski (Rhodes College)

Assistant coach(es)

- Chris Sumski (St. Andrews)
- Sydney Shelton (Lipscomb)
- Jacob Ogle (Lipscomb)

Legend

- (C) Team captain
- (S) Suspended
- (I) Ineligible
- (W) Walk-on
- Injured
- Current redshirt

Roster
Last update: January 7, 2025

== Schedule and results ==
Date time, TV	Rank^{#}	Opponent^{#}	Result	Record	Site (attendance) city, state
Non-conference regular season
November 4, 2024*; 11:00 am, SECN+		at Vanderbilt	L 50–102	0–1	Memorial Gymnasium (5,282); Nashville, TN
November 6, 2024*; 6:00 pm, ESPN+		Mississippi Valley State	W 69–56	1–1	Allen Arena (175); Nashville, TN
November 7, 2024*; 2:00 pm, ESPN+		Johnson (TN)	W 107–57	2–1	Allen Arena (70); Nashville, TN
November 11, 2024*; 6:00 pm, ESPN+		Tennessee State	W 83–61	3–1	Allen Arena (225); Nashville, TN
November 15, 2024*; 6:00 pm, ESPN+		East Tennessee State	W 62–61	4–1	Allen Arena (225); Nashville, TN
November 17, 2024*; 2:00 pm, ESPN+		at Morehead State	W 71–53	5–1	Ellis Johnson Arena (455); Morehead, KY
November 23, 2024*; 12:00 pm, ESPN+		Evansville	W 86–79	6–1	Allen Arena (327); Nashville, TN
November 25, 2024*; 10:00 am, ESPN+		at Chattanooga	L 60–66	6–2	McKenzie Arena (3,734); Chattanooga, TN
December 4, 2024*; 6:00 pm, ESPN+		Belmont; Battle of the Boulevard	L 55–63	6–3	Allen Arena (325); Nashville, TN
December 15, 2024*; 3:00 pm, SECN		at Missouri	L 57–78	6–4	Mizzou Arena (2,541); Columbia, MO
December 18, 2024*; 2:00 pm, ESPN+		Oglethorpe	W 113–38	7–4	Allen Arena (145); Nashville, TN
ASUN regular season
January 2, 2025; 6:00 pm, ESPN+		North Florida	W 76–53	8–4 (1–0)	Allen Arena (225); Nashville, TN
January 4, 2025; 2:00 pm, ESPN+		Eastern Kentucky	W 79–48	9–4 (2–0)	Allen Arena (175); Nashville, TN
January 8, 2025; 6:30 pm, ESPN+		at Central Arkansas	L 75-86	9-5 (2-1)	Farris Center (337); Conway, AR
January 11, 2025; 1:00 pm, ESPN+		at West Georgia	W 83-73 ^{OT}	10-5 (3-1)	The Coliseum (202); Carrollton, GA
January 16, 2025; 6:00 pm, ESPN+		Jacksonville	W 85-82	11-5 (4-1)	Allen Arena (124); Nashville, TN
January 18, 2025; 1:00 pm, ESPN+		at Queens	W 87-73	12-5 (5-1)	Curry Arena (211); Charlotte, NC
January 23, 2025; 6:00 pm, ESPN+		Central Arkansas	L 69-71	12-6 (5-2)	Allen Arena (195); Nashville, TN
January 25, 2025; 2:00 pm, ESPN+		North Alabama	W 85-76	13-6 (6-2)	Allen Arena (158); Nashville, TN
January 30, 2025; 5:00 pm, ESPN+		at Florida Gulf Coast	L 50-63	13-7 (6-3)	Alico Arena (1,789); Fort Myers, FL
February 1, 2025; 1:00 pm, ESPN+		at Stetson	L 70-74	13-8 (6-4)	Insight Credit Union Arena (312); DeLand, FL
February 5, 2025; 6:00 pm, ESPN+		West Georgia	W 92-75	14-8 (7-4)	Allen Arena (154); Nashville, TN
February 8, 2025; 2:00 pm, ESPN+		at Austin Peay	W 65-59	15-8 (8-4)	F&M Bank Arena (1,564); Clarksville, TN
February 13, 2025; 5:00 pm, ESPN+		Bellarmine	L 79-86 ^{OT}	15-9 (8-5)	Allen Arena (278); Nashville, TN
February 15, 2025; 1:30 pm, ESPN+		Queens	W 86-72	16-9 (9-5)	Allen Arena (278); Nashville, TN
February 20, 2025; 6:00 pm, ESPN+		at North Alabama	W 61-58	17-9 (10-5)	CB&S Bank Arena (1,411); Florence, AL
February 22, 2025; 2:00 pm, ESPN+		Austin Peay	W 66-64	18-9 (11-5)	Allen Arena (280); Nashville, TN
February 27, 2025; 5:30 pm, ESPN+		at Bellarmine	W 76-71	19-9 (12-5)	Knights Hall (682); Louisville, KY
March 1, 2025; 3:00 pm, ESPN+		at Eastern Kentucky	L 76-83	19-10 (12-6)	Baptist Health Arena; Richmond, KY
ASUN tournament
March 8, 2025; 3:00 pm, ESPN+	(3)	(6) North Alabama; Quarterfinals	W 73–64	20–10	Allen Arena (338); Nashville, TN
March 11, 2025; 6:30 pm, ESPN+	(3)	at (2) Central Arkansas; Semifinals	L 65–70	20–11	Farris Center (1,369); Conway, AR
WNIT
March 20, 2025; 6:00 pm, ESPN+		at Western Illinois; First Round	L 74–89	20–12	Western Hall; Macomb, IL
*Non-conference game. ^{#}Rankings from AP Poll. (#) Tournament seedings in parentheses. All times are in Eastern.
