= 2024–25 Florida Gulf Coast Eagles women's basketball team =

American college basketball season

2024–25 Florida Gulf Coast Eagles women's basketball
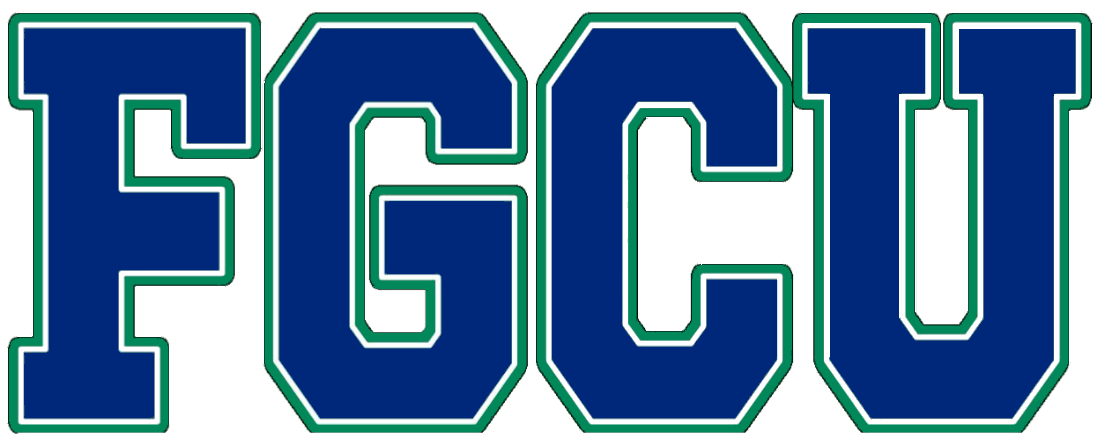

ASUN regular season and tournament champions

NCAA tournament, First Round
- Conference: Atlantic Sun Conference
- Record: 30–4 (18–0 ASUN)
- Head coach: Karl Smesko (23rd season; first 2 games); Chelsea Lyles (since 11/13/24)
- Assistant coaches: Camryn Brown; Sheahen Dowling; Lisa Zderadicka; Keri Jewett-Giles
- Home arena: Alico Arena

2024–25 ASUN women's basketball standings
	Conf.				Overall
Team	W		L	PCT	W		L	PCT
Florida Gulf Coast †	18	–	0	1.000	30	–	4	.882
Central Arkansas	15	–	3	.833	23	–	10	.697
Lipscomb	12	–	6	.667	20	–	12	.625
Eastern Kentucky	10	–	8	.556	21	–	12	.636
Stetson	10	–	8	.556	16	–	15	.516
North Alabama	8	–	10	.444	13	–	17	.433
Jacksonville	8	–	10	.444	14	–	17	.452
Bellarmine	8	–	10	.444	18	–	15	.545
West Georgia*	7	–	11	.389	13	–	17	.433
Austin Peay	7	–	11	.389	13	–	18	.419
Queens*	4	–	14	.222	10	–	19	.345
North Florida	1	–	17	.056	5	–	26	.161
† 2025 ASUN tournament winner * ineligible for the 2025 NCAA tournament due to transition from Division II

The 2024–25 Florida Gulf Coast Eagles women's basketball team represented Florida Gulf Coast University during the 2024–25 NCAA Division I women's basketball season. The Eagles played their home games at Alico Arena in Fort Myers, Florida, as members of the Atlantic Sun Conference.

After coaching the first two games of the season, on November 13, 2024, longtime head coach Karl Smesko announced that he would be stepping down from his position after 22+ seasons in order to take the head coaching position of the WNBA's Atlanta Dream, with assistant coach Chelsea Lyles being named his successor the following day, becoming just the second head coach in program history.

== Previous season ==
The Eagles finished the 2023–24 season 29–5, 16–0 in ASUN play, to finish as ASUN regular season champions for the seventh consecutive season. They defeated Jacksonville, Austin Peay, and Central Arkansas to win their eighth consecutive ASUN tournament title and earn the conference's automatic bid to the NCAA tournament. They received the #12 seed in the Albany Regional 1, where they would fall to #5 region seed Oklahoma in the first round.

== Roster ==
2024–25 Florida Gulf Coast Eagles women's basketball team
Players
Coaches

Pos.	#	Name	Height	Year	Previous school	Hometown
G	0	Karina Gordon	5 ft 9 in (1.75 m)	So	East Carolina	Hallandale Beach, Florida
G	1	Emani Jefferson (5Y)	5 ft 6 in (1.68 m)	Sr	Memphis	Miami, Florida
G	3	Cerina Rolle	5 ft 9 in (1.75 m)	RS Jr	Eustis High School	Eustis, Florida
G	4	Dolly Cairns (5Y)	5 ft 6 in (1.68 m)	Sr	Rhode Island	Saratoga Springs, New York
G	5	Alahna Paige (5Y)	5 ft 4 in (1.63 m)	Sr	Daemen	Rochester, New York
G	7	Khamari Mitchell-Steen	5 ft 7 in (1.7 m)	Sr	Northern Kentucky	Oak Ridge, Tennessee
F	10	Maca Retamales	6 ft 1 in (1.85 m)	Sr	Florida SouthWestern State	Santiago, Chile
G	11	Maddie Antenucci	5 ft 10 in (1.78 m)	RS Sr	Indian Hill High School	Cincinnati, Ohio
G	12	Kaelyn Flowers	5 ft 6 in (1.68 m)	Fr	Blackman High School	Murfreesboro, Tennessee
G	14	Casey Santoro (5Y)	5 ft 4 in (1.63 m)	Sr	Kent State	Bellevue, Ohio
G	23	Jordan Campbell	5 ft 9 in (1.75 m)	Jr	IMG Academy	Purcellville, Virginia
G	24	Lauryn Taylor (5Y)	5 ft 11 in (1.8 m)	Sr	Francis Marion	Blythewood, South Carolina
G	32	Skyler Gill	5 ft 10 in (1.78 m)	Sr	Kansas	Wichita, Kansas
G	33	Emani Theodule	5 ft 6 in (1.68 m)	RS So	Warner	Miramar, Florida
G	34	Anna Mortag (5Y)	6 ft 1 in (1.85 m)	Sr	Butler	Milwaukee, Wisconsin

Head coach

- Chelsea Lyles (Florida Gulf Coast)

Assistant coach(es)

- Camryn Brown (High Point)
- Sheahen Dowling (Florida Gulf Coast)
- Lisa Zderadicka (Florida Gulf Coast)
- Keri Jewett-Giles (Florida Gulf Coast)

Legend

- (C) Team captain
- (S) Suspended
- (I) Ineligible
- (W) Walk-on
- (5Y) Fifth-year senior
- Injured
- Current redshirt

Roster
Last update: January 6, 2025

== Schedule and results ==
Date time, TV	Rank^{#}	Opponent^{#}	Result	Record	Site (attendance) city, state
Non-conference regular season
November 5, 2024*; 7:00 pm, ESPN+		at Davidson	L 56–57	0–1	John M. Belk Arena (811); Davidson, NC
November 11, 2024*; 7:00 pm, ESPN+		at Columbia	L 51–62	0–2	Levien Gymnasium (762); New York, NY
November 17, 2024*; 1:00 pm, ESPN+		NJIT	W 73–53	1–2	Alico Arena (1,732); Fort Myers, FL
November 23, 2024*; 5:00 pm, ESPN+		vs. Georgetown; Atlantic Slam	W 66–57	2–2	Eastlink Centre (1,026); Charlottetown, PE
November 24, 2024*; 3:00 pm, ESPN+		vs. Cincinnati; Atlantic Slam	W 59–52	3–2	Eastlink Centre (804); Charlottetown, PE
November 29, 2024*; 4:00 pm, ESPN+		California Baptist; Homewood Suites Classic	W 66–56	4–2	Alico Arena (1,466); Fort Myers, FL
November 30, 2024*; 4:00 pm, ESPN+		Chattanooga; Homewood Suites Classic	W 61–53	5–2	Alico Arena (1,505); Fort Myers, FL
December 4, 2024*; 4:00 pm, ESPN+		New College	W 91–32	6–2	Alico Arena (1,334); Fort Myers, FL
December 8, 2024*; 1:00 pm, ESPN+		Ave Maria	W 82–43	7–2	Alico Arena (1,345); Fort Myers, FL
December 16, 2024*; 6:00 pm, ESPN+		Montana State	L 49–58	7–3	Alico Arena (1,429); Fort Myers, FL
December 20, 2024*; 4:00 pm, ESPN+		North Carolina A&T; FGCU Holiday Classic	W 79–48	8–3	Alico Arena; Fort Myers, FL
December 21, 2024*; 3:30 pm, ESPN+		East Tennessee State; FGCU Holiday Classic	W 67–54	9–3	Alico Arena (1,444); Fort Myers, FL
ASUN regular season
January 2, 2025; 6:00 pm, ESPN+		Queens	W 81–58	10–3 (1–0)	Alico Arena (1,540); Fort Myers, FL
January 4, 2025; 4:00 pm, ESPN+		West Georgia	W 63–49	11–3 (2–0)	Alico Arena (1,632); Fort Myers, FL
January 9, 2025; 7:00 pm, ESPN+		at North Florida	W 89–54	12–3 (3–0)	UNF Arena (359); Jacksonville, FL
January 11, 2025; 2:30 pm, ESPN+		at Jacksonville	W 92–50	13–3 (4–0)	Swisher Gymnasium (450); Jacksonville, FL
January 16, 2025; 7:00 pm, ESPN+		at Queens	W 69–47	14–3 (5–0)	Curry Arena (184); Charlotte, NC
January 18, 2025; 2:00 pm, ESPN+		at West Georgia	W 95–62	15–3 (6–0)	The Coliseum (287); Carrollton, GA
January 23, 2025; 6:30 pm, ESPN+		Bellarmine	W 80–63	16–3 (7–0)	Alico Arena (1,854); Fort Myers, FL
January 25, 2025; 2:00 pm, ESPN+		Eastern Kentucky	W 85–56	17–3 (8–0)	Alico Arena (2,017); Fort Myers, FL
January 30, 2025; 6:00 pm, ESPN+		Lipscomb	W 63–50	18–3 (9–0)	Alico Arena (1,789); Fort Myers, FL
February 1, 2025; 4:00 pm, ESPN+		Austin Peay	W 45–35	19–3 (10–0)	Alico Arena (2,399); Fort Myers, FL
February 6, 2025; 7:30 pm, ESPN+		at Bellarmine	W 74–57	20–3 (11–0)	Knights Hall (345); Louisville, KY
February 8, 2025; 3:00 pm, ESPN+		at Eastern Kentucky	W 68–65	21–3 (12–0)	Baptist Health Arena (386); Richmond, KY
February 12, 2025; 6:30 pm, ESPN+		North Florida	W 78–49	22–3 (13–0)	Alico Arena (1,694); Fort Myers, FL
February 15, 2025; 4:00 pm, ESPN+		Stetson	W 65–43	23–3 (14–0)	Alico Arena (2,339); Fort Myers, FL
February 20, 2025; 7:30 pm, ESPN+		at Central Arkansas	W 95–71	24–3 (15–0)	Farris Center (1,458); Conway, AR
February 22, 2025; 6:00 pm, ESPN+		at North Alabama	W 60–50	25–3 (16–0)	CB&S Bank Arena (1,618); Florence, AL
February 27, 2025; 6:00 pm, ESPN+		Jacksonville	W 78-64	26–3 (17–0)	Alico Arena (1,710); Fort Myers, FL
March 1, 2025; 2:00 pm, ESPN+		at Stetson	W 86–60	27–3 (18–0)	Insight Credit Union Arena (356); DeLand, FL
ASUN tournament
March 8, 2025; 6:30 p.m., ESPN+	(1)	(10) Austin Peay; Quarterfinals	W 82–48	28–3	Alico Arena (1,556); Fort Myers, FL
March 11, 2025; 6:30 p.m., ESPN+	(1)	(4) Eastern Kentucky; Semifinals	W 63–47	29–3	Alico Arena (1,534); Fort Myers, FL
March 15, 2025; 2:00 p.m., ESPN+	(1)	(2) Central Arkansas; Championship	W 68–51	30–3	Alico Arena; Fort Myers, FL
NCAA tournament
March 22, 2025; 2:30 pm, ESPNU	(14 S4)	at (3 S4) No. 11 Oklahoma; First Round	L 58–81	30–4	Lloyd Noble Center (8,006); Norman, OK
*Non-conference game. ^{#}Rankings from AP Poll. (#) Tournament seedings in parentheses. All times are in Eastern.

== See also ==
- 2024–25 Florida Gulf Coast Eagles men's basketball team
