= 2024–25 Queens Royals women's basketball team =

American college basketball season

2024–25 Queens Royals women's basketball
- Conference: Atlantic Sun Conference
- Record: 10–19 (4–14 ASUN)
- Head coach: Jen Brown (5th season)
- Assistant coaches: Kenneth Blake; Toia Giggetts; Jody Patton; Denisha Hall
- Home arena: Curry Arena

2024–25 ASUN women's basketball standings
	Conf.				Overall
Team	W		L	PCT	W		L	PCT
Florida Gulf Coast †	18	–	0	1.000	30	–	4	.882
Central Arkansas	15	–	3	.833	23	–	10	.697
Lipscomb	12	–	6	.667	20	–	12	.625
Eastern Kentucky	10	–	8	.556	21	–	12	.636
Stetson	10	–	8	.556	16	–	15	.516
North Alabama	8	–	10	.444	13	–	17	.433
Jacksonville	8	–	10	.444	14	–	17	.452
Bellarmine	8	–	10	.444	18	–	15	.545
West Georgia*	7	–	11	.389	13	–	17	.433
Austin Peay	7	–	11	.389	13	–	18	.419
Queens*	4	–	14	.222	10	–	19	.345
North Florida	1	–	17	.056	5	–	26	.161
† 2025 ASUN tournament winner * ineligible for the 2025 NCAA tournament due to transition from Division II

The 2024–25 Queens Royals women's basketball team represented the Queens University of Charlotte during the 2024–25 NCAA Division I women's basketball season. The Royals, led by fifth-year head coach Jen Brown, played their home games at Curry Arena in Charlotte, North Carolina as members of the Atlantic Sun Conference (ASUN). The Royals finished the season 10–19, 4–14 in ASUN play, to finish in eleventh place.

This season marked Queens' third year of a four-year transition period from Division II to Division I. As a result, the Royals are not eligible for NCAA postseason play until the 2026–27 season.

== Previous season ==
The Royals finished the 2023–24 season 7–22, 1–15 in ASUN play, to finish in last place. They failed to qualify for the ASUN tournament, as only the top eight teams qualify.

== Roster ==
2024–25 Queens Royals women's basketball team
Players
Coaches

Pos.	#	Name	Height	Year	Previous school	Hometown
F	0	Jordyn Weaver	5 ft 11 in (1.8 m)	Jr	Sam Houston	San Antonio, TX
G	1	Alyssa Lewis	5 ft 7 in (1.7 m)	So	NC State	Harrisburg, NC
G	3	Jermany Mapp	6 ft 0 in (1.83 m)	Sr	UMass	Chester, SC
F	4	Kaitlyn Adams	5 ft 11 in (1.8 m)	So	Winston-Salem Christian School	Winston-Salem, NC
G	6	Magda Freire	5 ft 8 in (1.73 m)	Fr	Escola básica e secundária Amélia Rey Colaço	Linda-a-Velha, Portugal
G	7	Shanelle Smith	5 ft 7 in (1.7 m)	Jr	Monroe	Staten Island, NY
F	8	Tamar Kopilevech	6 ft 3 in (1.91 m)	Jr	Eastern Wyoming College	Ashdod, Israel
G	10	Ana Barreto	6 ft 1 in (1.85 m)	So	Ball State	Lisbon, Portugal
G	11	Kamara Mills	5 ft 9 in (1.75 m)	Fr	Lawrence North High School	Indianapolis, IN
G	12	Aylesha Wade	5 ft 6 in (1.68 m)	Sr	Charlotte	York, SC
G	22	Dayuna Colvin	5 ft 9 in (1.75 m)	Jr	Butler Community College	Kennesaw, GA
G	24	Tiziana Huici	5 ft 8 in (1.73 m)	Sr	Rocamora	Corrientes, Argentina
C	32	Kemia Ward	6 ft 2 in (1.88 m)	Sr	Holy Spirit Prep	Powder Springs, GA

Head coach

- Jen Brown (James Madison)

Assistant coach(es)

- Kenneth Blake (Liberty)
- Toia Giggetts (James Madison)
- Jody Patton (Coker)
- Denisha Hall (Southern Wesleyan)

Legend

- (C) Team captain
- (S) Suspended
- (I) Ineligible
- (W) Walk-on
- Injured
- Current redshirt

Roster
Last update: January 10, 2025

== Schedule and results ==
Date time, TV	Rank^{#}	Opponent^{#}	Result	Record	Site (attendance) city, state
Non-conference regular season
November 4, 2024*; 5:00 p.m., ACCNX		at Wake Forest	L 40–102	0–1	LJVM Coliseum (916); Winston-Salem, NC
November 9, 2024*; 2:00 p.m., ESPN+		Wesleyan	W 97–29	1–1	Curry Arena (207); Charlotte, NC
November 13, 2024*; 12:00 p.m., ESPN+		Winthrop	L 52–69	1–2	Curry Arena (948); Charlotte, NC
November 18, 2024*; 7:00 p.m., ESPN+		Longwood	L 66–80	1–3	Curry Arena (207); Charlotte, NC
November 22, 2024*; 7:00 p.m., ESPN+		at USC Upstate	W 65–58	2–3	G. B. Hodge Center (178); Spartanburg, SC
November 26, 2024*; 6:00 p.m., ESPN+		South Carolina State	W 73–57	3–3	Curry Arena (226); Charlotte, NC
December 2, 2024*; 6:00 p.m., ESPN+		at Presbyterian	W 60–47	4–3	Templeton Center (275); Clinton, SC
December 7, 2024*; 2:00 p.m., ESPN+		Johnson & Wales (NC)	W 108–55	5–3	Curry Arena (157); Charlotte, NC
December 9, 2024*; 6:00 p.m., SECN+		at No. 16 Kentucky	L 45–87	5–4	Memorial Coliseum (4,193); Lexington, KY
December 14, 2024*; 2:00 p.m., ESPN+		Western Carolina	L 66–82	5–5	Curry Arena (212); Charlotte, NC
December 20, 2024*; 3:00 p.m., ESPN+		at Gardner–Webb	W 99–97 ^{3OT}	6–5	Paul Porter Arena (375); Boiling Springs, NC
ASUN regular season
January 2, 2025; 6:00 p.m., ESPN+		at Florida Gulf Coast	L 58–81	6–6 (0–1)	Alico Arena (1,540); Fort Myers, FL
January 4, 2025; 2:00 p.m., ESPN+		at Stetson	L 61–69	6–7 (0–2)	Insight Credit Union Arena (214); DeLand, FL
January 8, 2025; 7:00 p.m., ESPN+		Bellarmine	L 67–71	6–8 (0–3)	Curry Arena (356); Charlotte, NC
January 12, 2025; 2:00 p.m., ESPN+		Central Arkansas	L 57–66	6–9 (0–4)	Curry Arena (282); Charlotte, NC
January 16, 2025; 7:00 p.m., ESPN+		Florida Gulf Coast	L 47–69	6–10 (0–5)	Curry Arena (184); Charlotte, NC
January 18, 2025; 2:00 p.m., ESPN+		Lipscomb	L 73–87	6–11 (0–6)	Curry Arena (211); Charlotte, NC
January 23, 2025; 7:00 p.m., ESPN+		at North Florida	W 84–81 ^{OT}	7–11 (1–6)	UNF Arena (279); Jacksonville, FL
January 25, 2025; 2:00 p.m., ESPN+		at Jacksonville	L 76–83	7–12 (1–7)	Swisher Gymnasium (238); Jacksonville, FL
January 30, 2025; 7:00 p.m., ESPN+		at North Alabama	L 62–87	7–13 (1–8)	CB&S Bank Arena (1,381); Florence, AL
February 1, 2025; 2:00 p.m., ESPN+		at Central Arkansas	L 50–68	7–14 (1–9)	Farris Center (567); Conway, AR
February 6, 2025; 7:00 p.m., ESPN+		Austin Peay	W 52–43	8–14 (2–9)	Curry Arena (385); Charlotte, NC
February 8, 2025; 4:00 p.m., ESPN+		West Georgia	L 49–56	8–15 (2–10)	Curry Arena (468); Charlotte, NC
February 12, 2025; 7:00 p.m., ESPN+		Eastern Kentucky	L 62–75	8–16 (2–11)	Curry Arena (268); Charlotte, NC
February 15, 2025; 2:30 p.m., ESPN+		at Lipscomb	L 72–86	8–17 (2–12)	Allen Arena (316); Nashville, TN
February 20, 2025; 7:00 p.m., ESPN+		at Austin Peay	L 57–66	8–18 (2–13)	F&M Bank Arena (353); Clarksville, TN
February 22, 2025; 2:00 p.m., ESPN+		Stetson	W 75–64	9–18 (3–13)	Curry Arena (432); Charlotte, NC
February 27, 2025; 7:00 p.m., ESPN+		North Alabama	W 59–52	10–18 (4–13)	Curry Arena (352); Charlotte, NC
March 1, 2025; 2:00 p.m., ESPN+		at West Georgia	L 63–64	10–19 (4–14)	The Coliseum (367); Carrollton, GA
*Non-conference game. ^{#}Rankings from AP poll. (#) Tournament seedings in parentheses. All times are in Eastern.
