= 2024–25 West Georgia Wolves women's basketball team =

American college basketball season

2024–25 West Georgia Wolves women's basketball
- Conference: Atlantic Sun Conference
- Record: 13–16 (7–11 ASUN)
- Head coach: Joanna Reitz (3rd season)
- Assistant coaches: Todd Webb; Joel Harrison
- Home arena: The Coliseum

2024–25 ASUN women's basketball standings
	Conf.				Overall
Team	W		L	PCT	W		L	PCT
Florida Gulf Coast †	18	–	0	1.000	30	–	4	.882
Central Arkansas	15	–	3	.833	23	–	10	.697
Lipscomb	12	–	6	.667	20	–	12	.625
Eastern Kentucky	10	–	8	.556	21	–	12	.636
Stetson	10	–	8	.556	16	–	15	.516
North Alabama	8	–	10	.444	13	–	17	.433
Jacksonville	8	–	10	.444	14	–	17	.452
Bellarmine	8	–	10	.444	18	–	15	.545
West Georgia*	7	–	11	.389	13	–	17	.433
Austin Peay	7	–	11	.389	13	–	18	.419
Queens*	4	–	14	.222	10	–	19	.345
North Florida	1	–	17	.056	5	–	26	.161
† 2025 ASUN tournament winner * ineligible for the 2025 NCAA tournament due to transition from Division II

The 2024–25 West Georgia Wolves women's basketball team represented the University of West Georgia during the 2024–25 NCAA Division I women's basketball season. The Wolves, led by third-year head coach Joanna Reitz, played their home games at The Coliseum in Carrollton, Georgia as first-year members of the Atlantic Sun Conference (ASUN).

This season marked West Georgia's first year of a four-year transition period from Division II to Division I. As a result, the Wolves are currently not eligible to participate in the NCAA tournament until the 2028–29 season. A pending change to transition rules, scheduled to be voted on by the Division I Council in January 2025, would reduce the transition period to three years.

The Wolves finished the season 13–16, 7–11 in ASUN play, to finish in a tie for ninth place.

== Previous season ==
The Wolves finished the 2023–24 season 16–13, 12–12 in Gulf South Conference (GSC) play, to finish in second place. They were defeated by top-seeded and eventual tournament champions Valdosta State in the quarterfinals of the GSC tournament.

== Roster ==
2024–25 West Georgia Wolves women's basketball team
Players
Coaches

Pos.	#	Name	Height	Year	Previous school	Hometown
G	1	Sydne Tolbert	5 ft 4 in (1.63 m)	So	DuPont Manual High School	Louisville, KY
G	2	Zuriyah Davis	5 ft 7 in (1.7 m)	Sr	East Georgia State	Sugar Hill, GA
G	3	Mykah Anderson	5 ft 7 in (1.7 m)	Sr	Mesa Community College	Phoenix, AZ
G	5	Grace O'Gara	5 ft 5 in (1.65 m)	So	Auburn Montgomery	Worcester, MA
G	10	Calie Thrower	5 ft 6 in (1.68 m)	Jr	West Forsyth High School	Cumming, GA
F	11	Gal-la Font	6 ft 0 in (1.83 m)	So	Western Nebraska Community College	Barcelona, Spain
F	12	Destiny Jones	5 ft 9 in (1.75 m)	Fr	Central High School	Louisville, KY
G	13	Becca Ledford	5 ft 7 in (1.7 m)	Jr	Fannin County High School	Blue Ridge, GA
F	14	Amanda Blake	6 ft 2 in (1.88 m)	Sr	Grambling State	Summerville, SC
G	15	Riley Black	5 ft 9 in (1.75 m)	Fr	Chestatee High School	Gainesville, GA
F	21	Hannah Hicks	6 ft 1 in (1.85 m)	Sr	Morehead State	Cleveland, OH
C	32	K'Nari Holliday	6 ft 1 in (1.85 m)	Jr	Barry	Apopka, FL

Head coach

- Joanna Reitz (Covenant)

Assistant coach(es)

- Todd Webb (Western Kentucky)
- Joel Harrison (Faulkner)

Legend

- (C) Team captain
- (S) Suspended
- (I) Ineligible
- (W) Walk-on
- Injured
- Current redshirt

Roster
Last update: January 9, 2025

== Schedule and results ==
Date time, TV	Rank^{#}	Opponent^{#}	Result	Record	Site (attendance) city, state
Non-conference regular season
November 4, 2024*; 7:00 p.m., ESPN+		at Gardner–Webb	L 63–67	0–1	Paul Porter Arena (225); Boiling Springs, NC
November 9, 2024*; 8:00 p.m., ESPN+		at Loyola Chicago	L 60–76	0–2	Joseph J. Gentile Arena (419); Chicago, IL
November 14, 2024*; 7:00 p.m., ACCNX		at Georgia Tech	L 53–88	0–3	McCamish Pavilion (1,147); Atlanta, GA
November 20, 2024*; 7:00 p.m., ESPN+		Florida A&M	W 65–54	1–3	The Coliseum (722); Carrollton, GA
November 26, 2024*; 5:30 p.m., ESPN+		Talladega	W 76–31	2–3	The Coliseum (253); Carrollton, GA
November 29, 2024*; 2:00 p.m., ESPN+		South Carolina State	W 74–57	3–3	The Coliseum (284); Carrollton, GA
December 5, 2024*; 11:00 a.m., FloHoops		at UNC Wilmington	W 70–66	4–3	Trask Coliseum (2,810); Wilmington, NC
December 8, 2024*; 2:00 p.m., ESPN+		at Western Carolina	L 76–81 ^{OT}	4–4	Ramsey Center (531); Cullowhee, NC
December 18, 2024*; 7:00 p.m.		at Alabama State	W 63–46	5–4	Dunn–Oliver Acadome (466); Montgomery, AL
December 21, 2024*; 12:00 p.m., SECN+		at Vanderbilt	L 68–103	5–5	Memorial Gymnasium (2,634); Nashville, TN
December 29, 2024*; 2:00 p.m., ESPN+		Brenau	W 110–49	6–5	The Coliseum (384); Carrollton, GA
ASUN regular season
January 2, 2025; 7:00 p.m., ESPN+		at Stetson	L 64–79	6–6 (0–1)	Insight Credit Union Arena (210); DeLand, FL
January 4, 2025; 4:00 p.m., ESPN+		at Florida Gulf Coast	L 49–63	6–7 (0–2)	Alico Arena (1,632); Fort Myers, FL
January 8, 2025; 7:00 p.m., ESPN+		Eastern Kentucky	W 71–64	7–7 (1–2)	The Coliseum (223); Carrollton, GA
January 11, 2025; 2:00 p.m., ESPN+		Lipscomb	L 73–83 ^{OT}	7–8 (1–3)	The Coliseum (202); Carrollton, GA
January 16, 2025; 7:00 p.m., ESPN+		Bellarmine	L 78–86 ^{OT}	7–9 (1–4)	The Coliseum (342); Carrollton, GA
January 18, 2025; 2:00 p.m., ESPN+		Florida Gulf Coast	L 62–95	7–10 (1–5)	The Coliseum (287); Carrollton, GA
January 23, 2025; 6:30 p.m., ESPN+		at Jacksonville	L 74–87	7–11 (1–6)	Swisher Gymnasium (320); Jacksonville, FL
January 25, 2025; 2:00 p.m., ESPN+		at North Florida	W 79–71	8–11 (2–6)	UNF Arena (408); Jacksonville, FL
January 30, 2025; 7:00 p.m., ESPN+		Central Arkansas	L 64–67	8–12 (2–7)	The Coliseum (472); Carrollton, GA
February 1, 2025; 6:30 p.m., ESPN+		at North Alabama	L 73–82	8–13 (2–8)	CB&S Bank Arena (1,790); Florence, AL
February 5, 2025; 7:00 p.m., ESPN+		at Lipscomb	L 75–92	8–14 (2–9)	Allen Arena (154); Nashville, TN
February 8, 2025; 4:00 p.m., ESPN+		at Queens	W 56–49	9–14 (3–9)	Curry Arena (468); Charlotte, NC
February 12, 2025; 7:00 p.m., ESPN+		Austin Peay	W 70–57	10–14 (4–9)	The Coliseum (383); Carrollton, GA
February 15, 2025; 2:00 p.m., ESPN+		North Alabama	W 62–53	11–14 (5–9)	The Coliseum (276); Carrollton, GA
February 20, 2025; 5:30 p.m., ESPN+		Stetson	L 58–68	11–15 (5–10)	The Coliseum (422); Carrollton, GA
February 22, 2025; 2:00 p.m., ESPN+		at Central Arkansas	L 62–72	11–16 (5–11)	Farris Center (687); Conway, AR
February 27, 2025; 7:00 p.m., ESPN+		at Austin Peay	W 58–52	12–16 (6–11)	F&M Bank Arena (389); Clarksville, TN
March 1, 2025; 2:00 p.m., ESPN+		Queens	W 64–63	13–16 (7–11)	The Coliseum (367); Carrollton, GA
ASUN tournament
March 7, 2025; 6:00 p.m., ESPN+	(9)	vs. (10) Austin Peay; First round	L 49–60	13–17	Alico Arena (150); Fort Myers, FL
*Non-conference game. ^{#}Rankings from AP poll. (#) Tournament seedings in parentheses. All times are in Eastern.
