= 2024–25 Stetson Hatters women's basketball team =

American college basketball season

2024–25 Stetson Hatters women's basketball
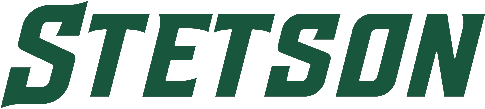
- Conference: Atlantic Sun Conference
- Record: 16–14 (10–8 ASUN)
- Head coach: Lynn Bria (17th season)
- Assistant coaches: Kristina Baugh; Liberty Crayton Del Rosario; Adrianne Harlow
- Home arena: Insight Credit Union Arena

2024–25 ASUN women's basketball standings
	Conf.				Overall
Team	W		L	PCT	W		L	PCT
Florida Gulf Coast †	18	–	0	1.000	30	–	4	.882
Central Arkansas	15	–	3	.833	23	–	10	.697
Lipscomb	12	–	6	.667	20	–	12	.625
Eastern Kentucky	10	–	8	.556	21	–	12	.636
Stetson	10	–	8	.556	16	–	15	.516
North Alabama	8	–	10	.444	13	–	17	.433
Jacksonville	8	–	10	.444	14	–	17	.452
Bellarmine	8	–	10	.444	18	–	15	.545
West Georgia*	7	–	11	.389	13	–	17	.433
Austin Peay	7	–	11	.389	13	–	18	.419
Queens*	4	–	14	.222	10	–	19	.345
North Florida	1	–	17	.056	5	–	26	.161
† 2025 ASUN tournament winner * ineligible for the 2025 NCAA tournament due to transition from Division II

The 2024–25 Stetson Hatters women's basketball team represented Stetson University during the 2024–25 NCAA Division I women's basketball season. The Hatters, led by 17th-year head coach Lynn Bria, played their home games at the Insight Credit Union Arena in DeLand, Florida as members of the Atlantic Sun Conference (ASUN).

The Hatters finished the season 16–14, 10–8 in ASUN play, to finish in a tie for fourth place. They were defeated in the quarterfinals of the ASUN tournament by fellow fourth seed Eastern Kentucky.

== Previous season ==
The Hatters finished the 2023–24 season 17–15, 12–4 in ASUN play, to finish in second place. They were upset by sixth-seeded Austin Peay in the quarterfinals of the ASUN tournament. They received an automatic bid into the WNIT, where they were defeated by FIU in the first round.

== Roster ==
2024–25 Stetson Hatters women's basketball team
Players
Coaches

Pos.	#	Name	Height	Year	Previous school	Hometown
G	1	Mary McMillan	5 ft 6 in (1.68 m)	GS	UCF	Apopka, FL
G	2	Senali Moss	5 ft 7 in (1.7 m)	Jr	Cape Fear Community College	Charlotte, NC
F	3	Sophia Fontaine	6 ft 2 in (1.88 m)	So	Proctor Academy	Chelsea, MA
G	4	Eva Bradshaw	5 ft 4 in (1.63 m)	So	Daytona State	Oviedo, FL
G	5	Noga Haran	5 ft 9 in (1.75 m)	So	Utah Valley	Modi'in, Israel
G	9	Cristina Gil Abad	5 ft 8 in (1.73 m)	GS	McNeese	Barcelona, Spain
G	10	Jorah Eppley	5 ft 9 in (1.75 m)	So	Catholic High School	Virginia Beach, VA
F	11	Tiasia McMillan	6 ft 0 in (1.83 m)	GS	Colgate	Tampa, FL
G	12	Promise Keshi	5 ft 9 in (1.75 m)	Jr	Liceo Scientifico Manfredi Azzarita	Rubano, Italy
F	13	Raven LeXander	5 ft 11 in (1.8 m)	Fr	Myers Park High School	Charlotte, NC
F	20	Diawna Carter-Hartley	6 ft 1 in (1.85 m)	So	Princeton High School	Cincinnati, OH
G	21	Cameron Thomas	5 ft 7 in (1.7 m)	Jr	Southwestern Michigan	Hazel Crest, IL
G	23	Shelby Calhoun	5 ft 11 in (1.8 m)	GS	Xavier	Louisville, KY
F	25	Quentarra Mitchell	5 ft 9 in (1.75 m)	GS	Chicago State	Nashville, TN
G	30	Tyra Myers	5 ft 7 in (1.7 m)	Jr	St. Francis Brooklyn	Columbia, SC

Head coach

- Lynn Bria (Charleston (WV))

Assistant coach(es)

- Kristina Baugh (Providence)
- Liberty Crayton Del Rosario (Notre Dame (OH))
- Adrianne Harlow (West Liberty)

Legend

- (C) Team captain
- (S) Suspended
- (I) Ineligible
- (W) Walk-on
- Injured
- Current redshirt

Roster
Last update: January 7, 2025

== Schedule and results ==
Date time, TV	Rank^{#}	Opponent^{#}	Result	Record	Site (attendance) city, state
Non-conference regular season
November 4, 2024*; 11:00 a.m., ACCNX		at Miami (FL)	L 53–78	0–1	Watsco Center (5,532); Coral Gables, FL
November 7, 2024*; 5:30 p.m., ESPN+		Fort Lauderdale	W 102–43	1–1	Insight Credit Union Arena; DeLand, FL
November 13, 2024*; 7:00 p.m., ESPN+		Edward Waters	W 76–38	2–1	Insight Credit Union Arena (222); DeLand, FL
November 16, 2024*; 4:00 p.m., ESPN+		at UCF	L 58–89	2–2	Addition Financial Arena (1,225); Orlando, FL
November 19, 2024*; 7:00 p.m., ESPN+		Florida Atlantic	W 75–63	3–2	Insight Credit Union Arena (293); DeLand, FL
November 29, 2024*; 1:15 p.m., BallerTV		vs. Bowling Green; Daytona Beach Classic	L 43–79	3–3	Ocean Center (125); Daytona Beach, FL
November 30, 2024*; 11:00 a.m., BallerTV		vs. Utah State; Daytona Beach Classic	W 84–76	4–3	Ocean Center (75); Daytona Beach, FL
December 5, 2024*; 6:00 p.m., ESPN+		at Iona	L 46–58	4–4	Hynes Athletics Center (1,068); New Rochelle, NY
December 7, 2024*; 12:00 p.m., ESPN+		at Navy	L 49–66	4–5	Alumni Hall (365); Annapolis, MD
December 14, 2024*; 1:30 p.m., ESPN+		High Point	W 76–72	5–5	Insight Credit Union Arena (117); DeLand, FL
December 19, 2024*; 11:00 a.m., ESPN+		South Alabama; Hatter Classic	L 79–87	5–6	Insight Credit Union Arena; DeLand, FL
December 20, 2024*; 11:00 a.m., ESPN+		Bradley; Hatter Classic	W 66–58	6–6	Insight Credit Union Arena; DeLand, FL
ASUN regular season
January 2, 2025; 7:00 p.m., ESPN+		West Georgia	W 79–64	7–6 (1–0)	Insight Credit Union Arena (210); DeLand, FL
January 4, 2025; 2:00 p.m., ESPN+		Queens	W 69–61	8–6 (2–0)	Insight Credit Union Arena (214); DeLand, FL
January 9, 2025; 6:30 p.m., ESPN+		at Jacksonville	L 60–68	8–7 (2–1)	Swisher Gymnasium (400); Jacksonville, FL
January 11, 2025; 2:00 p.m., ESPN+		at North Florida	W 80–63	9–7 (3–1)	UNF Arena (367); Jacksonville, FL
January 16, 2025; 7:00 p.m., ESPN+		at North Alabama	L 57–75	9–8 (3–2)	CB&S Bank Arena (1,673); Florence, AL
January 18, 2025; 2:00 p.m., ESPN+		at Central Arkansas	L 64–85	9–9 (3–3)	Farris Center (574); Conway, AR
January 23, 2025; 7:00 p.m., ESPN+		Eastern Kentucky	W 83–68	10–9 (4–3)	Insight Credit Union Arena (190); DeLand, FL
January 25, 2025; 2:00 p.m., ESPN+		Bellarmine	L 5–67	10–10 (4–4)	Insight Credit Union Arena (351); DeLand, FL
January 30, 2025; 11:00 a.m., ESPN+		Austin Peay	W 79–63	11–10 (5–4)	Insight Credit Union Arena (768); DeLand, FL
February 1, 2025; 2:00 p.m., ESPN+		Lipscomb	W 74–70	12–10 (6–4)	Insight Credit Union Arena (312); DeLand, FL
February 6, 2025; 7:00 p.m., ESPN+		at Eastern Kentucky	L 70–77	12–11 (6–5)	Baptist Health Arena (363); Richmond, KY
February 8, 2025; 2:00 p.m., ESPN+		at Bellarmine	W 87–84 ^{OT}	13–11 (7–5)	Knights Hall (351); Louisville, KY
February 12, 2025; 7:00 p.m., ESPN+		Jacksonville	W 68–63	14–11 (8–5)	Insight Credit Union Arena (368); DeLand, FL
February 15, 2025; 4:00 p.m., ESPN+		at Florida Gulf Coast	L 43–65	14–12 (8–6)	Alico Arena (2,339); Fort Myers, FL
February 20, 2025; 5:30 p.m., ESPN+		at West Georgia	W 68–58	15–12 (9–6)	The Coliseum (422); Carrollton, GA
February 22, 2025; 2:00 p.m., ESPN+		at Queens	L 64–75	15–13 (9–7)	Curry Arena (432); Charlotte, NC
February 27, 2025; 7:00 p.m., ESPN+		North Florida	W 71–63	16–13 (10–7)	Insight Credit Union Arena (364); DeLand, FL
March 1, 2025; 2:00 p.m., ESPN+		Florida Gulf Coast	L 60–86	16–14 (10–8)	Insight Credit Union Arena (356); DeLand, FL
ASUN tournament
March 8, 2025; 9:00 p.m., ESPN+	(5)	at (4) Eastern Kentucky; Quarterfinals	L 60–77	16–15	Baptist Health Arena (241); Richmond, KY
*Non-conference game. ^{#}Rankings from AP poll. (#) Tournament seedings in parentheses. All times are in Eastern.
