= 2024–25 Bellarmine Knights women's basketball team =

American college basketball season

2024–25 Bellarmine Knights women's basketball
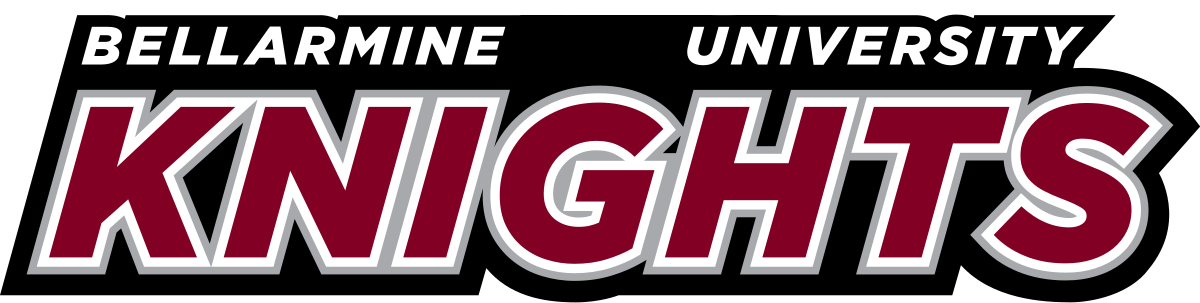
- Conference: Atlantic Sun Conference
- Record: 17–14 (8–10 ASUN)
- Head coach: Chancellor Dugan (13th season)
- Assistant coaches: Shannon Litton; Raven Merriweather; Monique Reid
- Home arena: Knights Hall

2024–25 ASUN women's basketball standings
| | Conf. | | | | Overall |
| Team | W | | L | PCT | W | | L | PCT |
|---|---|---|---|---|---|---|---|---|
| Florida Gulf Coast † | 18 | – | 0 | 1.000 | 30 | – | 4 | .882 |
| Central Arkansas | 15 | – | 3 | .833 | 23 | – | 10 | .697 |
| Lipscomb | 12 | – | 6 | .667 | 20 | – | 12 | .625 |
| Eastern Kentucky | 10 | – | 8 | .556 | 21 | – | 12 | .636 |
| Stetson | 10 | – | 8 | .556 | 16 | – | 15 | .516 |
| North Alabama | 8 | – | 10 | .444 | 13 | – | 17 | .433 |
| Jacksonville | 8 | – | 10 | .444 | 14 | – | 17 | .452 |
| Bellarmine | 8 | – | 10 | .444 | 18 | – | 15 | .545 |
| West Georgia* | 7 | – | 11 | .389 | 13 | – | 17 | .433 |
| Austin Peay | 7 | – | 11 | .389 | 13 | – | 18 | .419 |
| Queens* | 4 | – | 14 | .222 | 10 | – | 19 | .345 |
| North Florida | 1 | – | 17 | .056 | 5 | – | 26 | .161 |
† 2025 ASUN tournament winner * ineligible for the 2025 NCAA tournament due to transition from Division II

The 2024–25 Bellarmine Knights women's basketball team represented Bellarmine University during the 2024–25 NCAA Division I women's basketball season. The Knights, led by 13th-year head coach Chancellor Dugan, played their home games at Knights Hall in Louisville, Kentucky, as members of the Atlantic Sun Conference.

== Previous season ==
The Knights finished the 2023–24 season 10–19, 5–11 in ASUN play, to finish in tenth place. They were defeated by Jacksonville in the first round of the ASUN tournament.

The Knights were in the final year of a four-year transition from Division II to Division I, making the 2023–24 season the final season that they were ineligible for the NCAA tournament.

This was also the Knights' final season at Freedom Hall. Near the start of the 2024–25 school year, which coincided with the end of Bellarmine's transition to Division I, the school announced that home games would return to campus at Knights Hall.

== Roster ==
2024–25 Bellarmine Knights women's basketball team
Players
Coaches

| Pos. | # | Name | Height | Year | Previous school | Hometown |
|---|---|---|---|---|---|---|
| F | 0 | Mina Milosevic | 6 ft 2 in (1.88 m) | Fr | Fryeburg Academy | Belgrade, Serbia |
| G | 1 | Miyah Brown | 5 ft 10 in (1.78 m) | Jr | Winnebago High School | Rockford, Illinois |
| F | 2 | Rachel Shropshire | 6 ft 3 in (1.91 m) | Fr | Franklin County High School | Frankfort, Kentucky |
| G | 4 | Hope Sivori | 5 ft 5 in (1.65 m) | GS | Western Kentucky | Louisville, Kentucky |
| G | 5 | Ashlee Harris | 5 ft 6 in (1.68 m) | RS Sr | Sacred Heart Academy | Louisville, Kentucky |
| F | 6 | Skylar Treadwell | 6 ft 1 in (1.85 m) | GS | Stetson | Daytona Beach, Florida |
| G/F | 11 | Anna Rodgers | 5 ft 11 in (1.8 m) | Fr | Bullitt East High School | Mount Washington, Kentucky |
| F | 12 | Kayce Hyman | 5 ft 10 in (1.78 m) | Fr | Hammond School | Irmo, South Carolina |
| G | 20 | Erin Toller | 5 ft 7 in (1.7 m) | GS | Georgetown College | Louisville, Kentucky |
| G | 22 | Mia Beam | 5 ft 8 in (1.73 m) | GS | Cornell | Louisville, Kentucky |
| G | 23 | Hayley Harrison | 5 ft 10 in (1.78 m) | GS | UT Martin | Winchester, Kentucky |
| C | 35 | Hana Abdel Aal | 6 ft 2 in (1.88 m) | Fr | Alexandria House of English | Alexandria, Egypt |

Head coach

- Chancellor Dugan (Eastern Kentucky)

Assistant coach(es)

- Shannon Litton (Morehead State)
- Raven Merriweather (Bellarmine)
- Monique Reid (Louisville)

Legend

- (C) Team captain
- (S) Suspended
- (I) Ineligible
- (W) Walk-on
- Injured
- Current redshirt

Roster
Last update: January 7, 2025

== Schedule and results ==
| Date time, TV | Rank^{#} | Opponent^{#} | Result | Record | Site (attendance) city, state |
Exhibition
| October 27, 2024*; 2:00 pm | | Centre | W 87–60 | – | Knights Hall (455); Louisville, KY |
| October 30, 2024*; 6:30 pm | | Spalding | W 97–46 | – | Knights Hall (405); Louisville, KY |
Non-conference regular season
| November 4, 2024*; 6:30 pm, ESPN+ | | IU Southeast | W 88–56 | 1–0 | Knights Hall (473); Louisville, KY |
| November 6, 2024*; 6:30 pm, ESPN+ | | Midway | W 105–70 | 2–0 | Knights Hall (252); Louisville, KY |
| November 10, 2024*; 1:00 pm, ESPN+ | | at Ohio | W 82–50 | 3–0 | Convocation Center (287); Athens, OH |
| November 16, 2024*; 1:00 pm, ESPN+ | | at Detroit Mercy | L 71–73 | 3–1 | Calihan Hall (749); Detroit, MI |
| November 18, 2024*; 7:00 pm, B1G+ | | at Purdue | L 67–78 | 3–2 | Mackey Arena (3,415); West Lafayette, IN |
| November 21, 2024*; 6:30 pm, ESPN+ | | Wright State | W 79–71 | 4–2 | Knights Hall (472); Louisville, KY |
| November 24, 2024*; 2:00 pm, ESPN+ | | Akron | W 72–65 | 5–2 | Knights Hall (441); Louisville, KY |
| November 29, 2024*; 12:00 pm | | vs. Jackson State; Spartan Shootout | W 67–59 | 6–2 | G. B. Hodge Center (117); Spartanburg, SC |
| November 30, 2024*; 3:00 pm, ESPN+ | | at USC Upstate; Spartan Shootout | W 72–64 | 7–2 | G. B. Hodge Center (149); Spartanburg, SC |
| December 8, 2024*; 2:00 pm, ESPN+ | | at Morehead State | W 76–70 | 8–2 | Ellis Johnson Arena (675); Morehead, KY |
| December 12, 2024*; 6:30 pm, ESPN+ | | Chattanooga | W 67–66 | 9–2 | Knights Hall (408); Louisville, KY |
| December 15, 2024*; 2:00 pm, B1G+ | | at Indiana | L 61–95 | 9–3 | Simon Skjodt Assembly Hall (10,220); Bloomington, IN |
| December 21, 2024*; 2:00 pm, ESPN+ | | at Saint Louis | L 69–86 | 9–4 | Chaifetz Arena (526); St. Louis, MO |
ASUN regular season
| January 2, 2025; 6:30 pm, ESPN+ | | North Alabama | L 89–90 ^{OT} | 9–5 (0–1) | Knights Hall (417); Louisville, KY |
| January 4, 2025; 2:00 pm, ESPN+ | | Central Arkansas | W 68–60 | 10–5 (1–1) | Knights Hall (372); Louisville, KY |
| January 8, 2025; 7:00 pm, ESPN+ | | at Queens | W 71-67 | 11-5 (2-1) | Curry Arena (356); Charlotte, NC |
| January 11, 2025; 1:00 pm, ESPN+ | | Austin Peay | L 58-69 | 11-6 (2-2) | Knights Hall (483); Louisville, KY |
| January 16, 2025; 7:00 pm, ESPN+ | | at West Georgia | W 86-78 ^{OT} | 12-6 (3-2) | The Coliseum (342); Carrollton, GA |
| January 18, 2025; 4:00 pm, ESPN+ | | at Eastern Kentucky | L 75-91 | 12-7 (3-3) | Baptist Health Arena (310); Richmond, KY |
| January 23, 2025; 6:30 pm, ESPN+ | | at Florida Gulf Coast | L 63-80 | 12-8 (3-4) | Alico Arena (1,854); Fort Myers, FL |
| January 25, 2025; 2:00 pm, ESPN+ | | at Stetson | W 67-52 | 13-8 (4-4) | Insight Credit Union Arena (351); DeLand, FL |
| January 30, 2025; 6:30 pm, ESPN+ | | North Florida | W 80-69 | 14-8 (5-4) | Knights Hall (372); Louisville, KY |
| February 1, 2025; 2:00 pm, ESPN+ | | Jacksonville | L 83-91 | 14-9 (5-5) | Knights Hall (365); Louisville, KY |
| February 6, 2025; 6:30 pm, ESPN+ | | Florida Gulf Coast | L 57-74 | 14-10 (5-6) | Knights Hall (345); Louisville, KY |
| February 8, 2025; 2:00 pm, ESPN+ | | Stetson | L 84-87 ^{OT} | 14-11 (5-7) | Knights Hall (351); Louisville, KY |
| February 13, 2025; 6:00 pm, ESPN+ | | at Lipscomb | W 86-79 ^{OT} | 15-11 (6-7) | Allen Arena (278); Nashville, TN |
| February 15, 2025; 1:00 pm, ESPN+ | | Eastern Kentucky | L 73-79 | 15-12 (6-8) | Knights Hall (627); Louisville, KY |
| February 20, 2025; 6:30 pm, ESPN+ | | at Jacksonville | W 78-73 | 16-12 (7-8) | Swisher Gymnasium (527); Jacksonville, FL |
| February 22, 2025; 2:00 pm, ESPN+ | | at North Florida | W 93-65 | 17-12 (8-8) | UNF Arena (261); Jacksonville, FL |
| February 27, 2025; 6:30 pm, ESPN+ | | Lipscomb | L 71-76 | 17-13 (8-9) | Knights Hall (682); Louisville, KY |
| March 1, 2025; 3:00 pm, ESPN+ | | at Austin Peay | L 63-72 | 17-14 (8-10) | F&M Bank Arena (532); Clarksville, TN |
ASUN tournament
| March 7, 2025; 7:30 p.m., ESPN+ | (8) | vs. (7) Jacksonville; First Round | W 80–79 ^{OT} | 18–14 | Farris Center (175); Conway, AR |
| March 8, 2025; 7:30 p.m., ESPN+ | (8) | at (2) Central Arkansas; Quarterfinals | L 57–77 | 18–15 | Farris Center (1,258); Conway, AR |
*Non-conference game. ^{#}Rankings from AP Poll. (#) Tournament seedings in parentheses. All times are in Eastern.
