= 2024–25 Jacksonville Dolphins women's basketball team =

American college basketball season

2024–25 Jacksonville Dolphins women's basketball
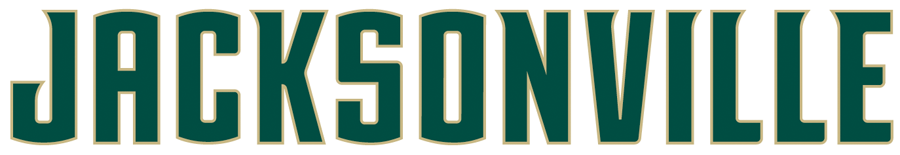
- Conference: Atlantic Sun Conference
- Record: 14–16 (8–10 ASUN)
- Head coach: Special Jennings (2nd season)
- Assistant coaches: Rashad Lyle; Jordan Walker; Diego Torres
- Home arena: Swisher Gymnasium

2024–25 ASUN women's basketball standings
	Conf.				Overall
Team	W		L	PCT	W		L	PCT
Florida Gulf Coast †	18	–	0	1.000	30	–	4	.882
Central Arkansas	15	–	3	.833	23	–	10	.697
Lipscomb	12	–	6	.667	20	–	12	.625
Eastern Kentucky	10	–	8	.556	21	–	12	.636
Stetson	10	–	8	.556	16	–	15	.516
North Alabama	8	–	10	.444	13	–	17	.433
Jacksonville	8	–	10	.444	14	–	17	.452
Bellarmine	8	–	10	.444	18	–	15	.545
West Georgia*	7	–	11	.389	13	–	17	.433
Austin Peay	7	–	11	.389	13	–	18	.419
Queens*	4	–	14	.222	10	–	19	.345
North Florida	1	–	17	.056	5	–	26	.161
† 2025 ASUN tournament winner * ineligible for the 2025 NCAA tournament due to transition from Division II

The 2024–25 Jacksonville Dolphins women's basketball team represented Jacksonville University during the 2024–25 NCAA Division I women's basketball season. The Dolphins, led by second-year head coach Special Jennings, played their home games at Swisher Gymnasium in Jacksonville, Florida as members of the Atlantic Sun Conference (ASUN).

== Previous season ==
The Dolphins finished the 2023–24 season 11–20, 6–10 in ASUN play, to finish in ninth place. They defeated Bellarmine, before falling to top-seeded and eventual tournament champions Florida Gulf Coast in the quarterfinals of the ASUN tournament.

== Roster ==
2024–25 Jacksonville Dolphins women's basketball team
Players
Coaches

Pos.	#	Name	Height	Year	Previous school	Hometown
G	1	Isamery Telleria	5 ft 9 in (1.75 m)	Sr	Liceo Ercília Pepín	San Francisco de Macorís, Dominican Republic
G	2	Bailey Burns	5 ft 10 in (1.78 m)	So	Cloud County CC	Lee's Summit, MO
G	3	Sana'a Garrett	5 ft 7 in (1.7 m)	So	Friends' Central School	Philadelphia, PA
F	4	Makayla Edwards	5 ft 11 in (1.8 m)	GS	Hawaii	Vallejo, CA
G	5	Comari Mitchell	5 ft 8 in (1.73 m)	Fr	Western Branch HS	Richmond, VA
G	10	Edyn Battle	5 ft 7 in (1.7 m)	Sr	Miami (OH)	Gahanna, OH
F	11	Zaria Blake	6 ft 0 in (1.83 m)	Jr	Blanche Ely HS	Deerfield Beach, FL
G	12	Julene Royale	5 ft 8 in (1.73 m)	Jr	Gernika KESB	Galdakao, Spain
G	13	LaRonda Quattlebaum	5 ft 5 in (1.65 m)	RS So	A.C. Flora HS	Columbia, SC
F	15	Saniyah Craig	6 ft 1 in (1.85 m)	So	AZ Compass Prep	Phoenix, AZ
C	20	Jada Duckett	6 ft 2 in (1.88 m)	Sr	Old Dominion	Chicago, IL
F	22	Mariah Knight	6 ft 1 in (1.85 m)	Fr	Butler HS	Louisville, KY
G	23	Priscilla Williams	6 ft 2 in (1.88 m)	Sr	Oregon	Houston, TX
C	24	Jada Jones	6 ft 4 in (1.93 m)	So	Sandalwood HS	Jacksonville, FL
G	32	Giana Provenzano	5 ft 11 in (1.8 m)	Fr	Montverde Academy	Syracuse, NY

Head coach

- Special Jennings (Xavier)

Assistant coach(es)

- Rashad Lyle (Kennesaw State)
- Jordan Walker (Tennessee)
- Diego Torres (Oregon)

Legend

- (C) Team captain
- (S) Suspended
- (I) Ineligible
- (W) Walk-on
- Injured
- Current redshirt

Roster
Last update: January 9, 2025

== Schedule and results ==
Date time, TV	Rank^{#}	Opponent^{#}	Result	Record	Site (attendance) city, state
Non-conference regular season
November 6, 2024*; 6:30 p.m., ESPN+		Edward Waters	W 80–59	1–0	Swisher Gymnasium (493); Jacksonville, FL
November 11, 2024*; 7:00 p.m., ACCN		at Miami (FL)	L 71–74	1–1	Watsco Center (1,907); Coral Gables, FL
November 13, 2024*; 7:00 p.m., ESPN+		at FIU	W 72–54	2–1	Ocean Bank Convocation Center (511); Miami, FL
November 18, 2024*; 6:30 p.m., ESPN+		Florida A&M	W 58–50	3–1	Swisher Gymnasium (563); Jacksonville, FL
November 20, 2024*; 7:00 p.m., ESPN+		at South Florida	L 57–75	3–2	Yuengling Center (2,407); Tampa, FL
November 24, 2024*; 3:30 p.m., NBCS		vs. Mississippi State; WBCA State Farm Showcase	L 35–80	3–3	State Farm Field House (1,310); Bay Lake, FL
November 27, 2024*; 6:30 p.m., ESPN+		Mercer	W 74–49	4–3	Swisher Gymnasium (350); Jacksonville, FL
November 30, 2024*; 2:00 p.m., ESPN+		Hofstra	W 84–70	5–3	Swisher Gymnasium (300); Jacksonville, FL
December 5, 2024*; 6:00 p.m., ESPN+		at Georgia Southern	W 56–51	6–3	Hill Convocation Center (924); Statesboro, GA
December 13, 2024*; 11:00 a.m., ESPN+		at Marshall	L 76–78	6–4	Cam Henderson Center (3,733); Huntington, WV
December 19, 2024*; 6:00 p.m., ACCNX		at Florida State	L 74–97	6–5	Donald L. Tucker Center (1,445); Tallahassee, FL
December 29, 2024*; 12:00 p.m., SECN+		at No. 20 Alabama	L 46–93	6–6	Coleman Coliseum (2,175); Tuscaloosa, AL
ASUN regular season
January 2, 2025; 6:00 p.m., ESPN+		at Central Arkansas	L 63–74	6–7 (0–1)	Farris Center (673); Conway, AR
January 4, 2025; 2:30 p.m., ESPN+		at North Alabama	L 57–73	6–8 (0–2)	CB&S Bank Arena (1,414); Florence, AL
January 9, 2025; 6:30 p.m., ESPN+		Stetson	W 68–60	7–8 (1–2)	Swisher Gymnasium (400); Jacksonville, FL
January 11, 2025; 2:00 p.m., ESPN+		Florida Gulf Coast	L 50–92	7–9 (1–3)	Swisher Gymnasium (450); Jacksonville, FL
January 16, 2025; 7:00 p.m., ESPN+		at Lipscomb	L 82–85	7–10 (1–4)	Allen Arena (124); Nashville, TN
January 18, 2025; 5:00 p.m., ESPN+		at Austin Peay	W 65–61	8–10 (2–4)	F&M Bank Arena (388); Clarksville, TN
January 23, 2025; 6:30 p.m., ESPN+		West Georgia	W 87–74	9–10 (3–4)	Swisher Gymnasium (320); Jacksonville, FL
January 25, 2025; 2:00 p.m., ESPN+		Queens	W 83–76	10–10 (4–4)	Swisher Gymnasium (238); Jacksonville, FL
January 30, 2025; 7:00 p.m., ESPN+		at Eastern Kentucky	L 75–88	10–11 (4–5)	Baptist Health Arena (403); Richmond, KY
February 1, 2025; 2:00 p.m., ESPN+		at Bellarmine	W 91–83	11–11 (5–5)	Knights Hall (365); Louisville, KY
February 6, 2025; 6:30 p.m., ESPN+		Central Arkansas	L 65–76	11–12 (5–6)	Swisher Gymnasium (250); Jacksonville, FL
February 8, 2025; 2:00 p.m., ESPN+		North Alabama	W 78–61	12–12 (6–6)	Swisher Gymnasium (250); Jacksonville, FL
February 12, 2025; 7:00 p.m., ESPN+		at Stetson	L 63-68	12-13 (6-7)	Insight Credit Union Arena; DeLand, FL
February 15, 2025; 2:00 p.m., ESPN+		North Florida	W 63-52	13-13 (7-7)	Swisher Gymnasium (458); Jacksonville, FL
February 20, 2025; 6:30 p.m., ESPN+		Bellarmine	L 73-78	13-14 (7-8)	Swisher Gymnasium (527); Jacksonville, FL
February 22, 2025; 2:00 p.m., ESPN+		Eastern Kentucky	W 80-72	14-14 (8-8)	Swisher Gymnasium (457); Jacksonville, FL
February 27, 2025; 6:00 p.m., ESPN+		at Florida Gulf Coast	L 64-78	14-15 (8-9)	Alico Arena (1,710); Fort Myers, FL
March 1, 2025; 2:00 p.m., ESPN+		at North Florida	L 61-69	14-16 (8-10)	UNF Arena (501); Jacksonville, FL
ASUN tournament
March 7, 2025; 7:30 pm, ESPN+	(7)	vs. (8) Bellarmine; First Round	L 79–80 ^{OT}	14–17	Farris Center (175); Conway, AR
*Non-conference game. ^{#}Rankings from AP poll. (#) Tournament seedings in parentheses. All times are in Eastern.
