= 2024–25 North Florida Ospreys women's basketball team =

American college basketball season

2024–25 North Florida Ospreys women's basketball
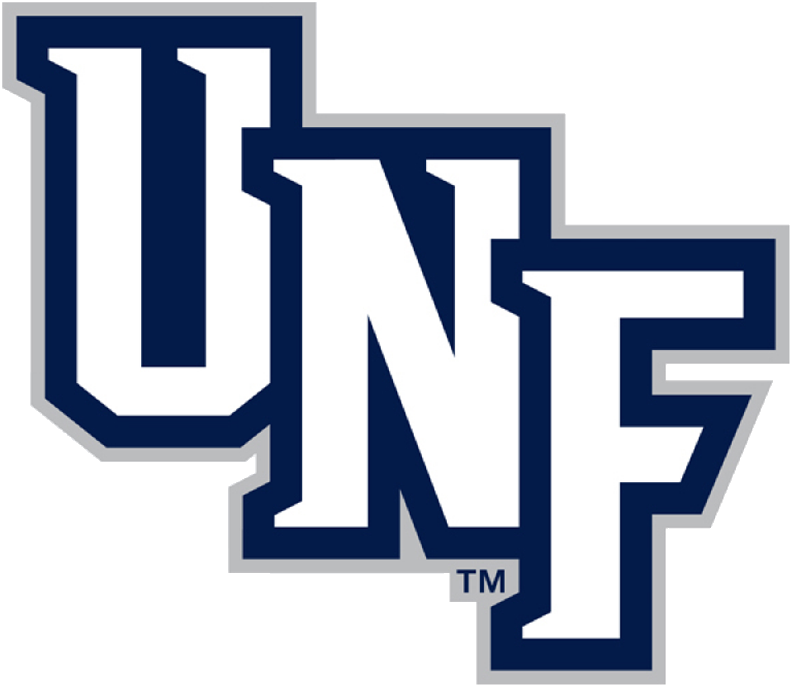
- Conference: Atlantic Sun Conference
- Record: 5–26 (1–17 ASUN)
- Head coach: Erika Lambert (2nd season)
- Associate head coach: Tron Griffin
- Assistant coaches: Sydnei McCaskill; Gadiva Hubbard; Chris Dixon
- Home arena: UNF Arena

2024–25 ASUN women's basketball standings
	Conf.				Overall
Team	W		L	PCT	W		L	PCT
Florida Gulf Coast †	18	–	0	1.000	30	–	4	.882
Central Arkansas	15	–	3	.833	23	–	10	.697
Lipscomb	12	–	6	.667	20	–	12	.625
Eastern Kentucky	10	–	8	.556	21	–	12	.636
Stetson	10	–	8	.556	16	–	15	.516
North Alabama	8	–	10	.444	13	–	17	.433
Jacksonville	8	–	10	.444	14	–	17	.452
Bellarmine	8	–	10	.444	18	–	15	.545
West Georgia*	7	–	11	.389	13	–	17	.433
Austin Peay	7	–	11	.389	13	–	18	.419
Queens*	4	–	14	.222	10	–	19	.345
North Florida	1	–	17	.056	5	–	26	.161
† 2025 ASUN tournament winner * ineligible for the 2025 NCAA tournament due to transition from Division II

The 2024–25 North Florida Ospreys women's basketball team represented the University of North Florida during the 2024–25 NCAA Division I women's basketball season. The Ospreys, led by second-year head coach Erika Lambert, played their home games at the UNF Arena in Jacksonville, Florida, as members of the Atlantic Sun Conference.

== Previous season ==
The Ospreys finished the 2023–24 season 9–21, 3–13 in ASUN play, to finish in 11th place. They failed to qualify for the ASUN tournament, as only the top eight teams qualify.

== Roster ==
2024–25 North Florida Ospreys women's basketball team
Players
Coaches

Pos.	#	Name	Height	Year	Previous school	Hometown
G	1	Jamisyn Stinson	5 ft 11 in (1.8 m)	Fr	Sheridan High School	Thornville, Ohio
G	2	Jazmine Spencer	5 ft 6 in (1.68 m)	Sr	Jacksonville State	Bartow, Florida
G	3	Anja Ekstrom	5 ft 6 in (1.68 m)	So	Western Wyoming Community College	Spånga, Sweden
G	4	Sarah Taub	5 ft 9 in (1.75 m)	Jr	Campbell High School	Marietta, Georgia
G	5	Helena Rafnsdottir	5 ft 11 in (1.8 m)	Jr	Sudurnes Comprehensive College	Reykjanesbær, Iceland
G	10	Maddie Millar	5 ft 9 in (1.75 m)	RS So	Bishop Kenny High School	Amelia Island, Florida
F	11	Nia Brown	6 ft 1 in (1.85 m)	Jr	Daytona State College	Middleburg, Florida
F	13	Selma Eklund	6 ft 0 in (1.83 m)	Sr	UNC Wilmington	Stockholm, Sweden
G	15	Grace Hunter	5 ft 10 in (1.78 m)	GS	Northern Illinois	Monroeville, Indiana
F	20	Sydney Pettis	6 ft 2 in (1.88 m)	So	Moberly Area Community College	Harrisburg, Pennsylvania
G	22	Alexa Washington	5 ft 6 in (1.68 m)	So	Oakland Catholic High School	Monroeville, Pennsylvania
G	23	Kaila Rougier	5 ft 6 in (1.68 m)	Sr	Beach High School	Savannah, Georgia
F	24	Jasmynne Gibson	6 ft 1 in (1.85 m)	Fr	Colonial High School	Apopka, Florida
F	32	Lauren Bell	6 ft 3 in (1.91 m)	Fr	Viera High School	Melbourne, Florida
F	35	Nicole Carreno	5 ft 10 in (1.78 m)	Fr	Seffner Christian Academy	Riverview, Florida

Head coach

- Erika Lambert (College of Charleston)

Assistant coach(es)

- Tron Griffin (Bethune–Cookman)
- Sydnei McCaskill (Florida Gulf Coast)
- Gadiva Hubbard (Minnesota)
- Chris Dixon (Armstrong State)

Legend

- (C) Team captain
- (S) Suspended
- (I) Ineligible
- (W) Walk-on
- Injured
- Current redshirt

Roster
Last update: January 10, 2025

== Schedule and results ==
Date time, TV	Rank^{#}	Opponent^{#}	Result	Record	Site (attendance) city, state
Non-conference regular season
November 4, 2024*; 11:00 am, ACCNX		at No. 19 Florida State	L 49–119	0–1	Donald L. Tucker Center (4,132); Tallahassee, FL
November 6, 2024*; 11:00 am, ESPN+		Trinity Baptist	W 146–53	1–1	UNF Arena (1,989); Jacksonville, FL
November 9, 2024*; 1:00 pm, ESPN+		Georgia Southern	L 65–81	1–2	UNF Arena (498); Jacksonville, FL
November 13, 2024*; 11:00 am, ESPN+		at Florida Atlantic	L 41–50	1–3	Eleanor R. Baldwin Arena (1,211); Boca Raton, FL
November 19, 2024*; 11:00 am, ESPN+		at UCF	L 53–82	1–4	Addition Financial Arena (2,578); Orlando, FL
November 23, 2024*; 2:00 pm, ESPN+		at Winthrop	L 61–71	1–5	Winthrop Coliseum (360); Rock Hill, SC
November 29, 2024*; 1:00 pm, ESPN+		Coppin State; UNF Thanksgiving Tournament	L 61–76	1–6	UNF Arena (360); Jacksonville, FL
November 30, 2024*; 1:00 pm, ESPN+		Samford; UNF Thanksgiving Tournament	W 79–71	2–6	UNF Arena (358); Jacksonville, FL
December 3, 2024*; 8:00 pm, B1G+		at Minnesota	L 44–90	2–7	Williams Arena (2,931); Minneapolis, MN
December 7, 2024*; 2:00 pm		at Florida A&M	L 57–85	2–8	Al Lawson Center; Tallahassee, FL
December 14, 2024*; 2:00 pm, ESPN+		UNC Asheville	W 73–57	3–8	UNF Arena (279); Jacksonville, FL
December 16, 2024*; 1:00 pm, ESPN+		Coastal Georgia	W 70–38	4–8	UNF Arena (115); Jacksonville, FL
December 21, 2024*; 2:45 pm, SECN+		at Florida	L 47–75	4–9	O'Connell Center (1,394); Gainesville, FL
ASUN regular season
January 2, 2025; 7:00 pm, ESPN+		at Lipscomb	L 53–76	4–10 (0–1)	Allen Arena (225); Nashville, TN
January 4, 2025; 3:00 pm, ESPN+		at Austin Peay	L 52–60	4–11 (0–2)	F&M Bank Arena (687); Clarksville, TN
January 9, 2025; 7:00 pm, ESPN+		Florida Gulf Coast	L 54–89	4–12 (0–3)	UNF Arena (359); Jacksonville, FL
January 11, 2025; 2:00 pm, ESPN+		Stetson	L 63-80	4-13 (0-4)	UNF Arena (367); Jacksonville, FL
January 16, 2025; 6:30 pm, ESPN+		at Central Arkansas	L 53-67	4-14 (0-5)	Farris Center; Conway, AR
January 18, 2025; 7:00 pm, ESPN+		at North Alabama	L 54-65	4-15 (0-6)	CB&S Bank Arena (1,351); Florence, AL
January 23, 2025; 7:00 pm, ESPN+		Queens	L 81-84 ^{OT}	4-16 (0-7)	UNF Arena (279); Jacksonville, FL
January 25, 2025; 2:00 pm, ESPN+		West Georgia	L 71-79	4-17 (0-8)	UNF Arena (408); Jacksonville, FL
January 30, 2025; 6:30 pm, ESPN+		at Bellarmine	L 69-80	4-18 (0-9)	Knights Hall (372); Louisville, KY
February 1, 2025; 1:00 pm, ESPN+		at Eastern Kentucky	L 44-78	4-19 (0-10)	Baptist Health Arena (296); Richmond, KY
February 6, 2025; 5:00 pm, ESPN+		North Alabama	L 68-73	4-20 (0-11)	UNF Arena (250); Jacksonville, FL
February 8, 2025; 2:00 pm, ESPN+		Central Arkansas	L 59-72	4-21 (0-12)	UNF Arena (276); Jacksonville, FL
February 12, 2025; 6:30 pm, ESPN+		at Florida Gulf Coast	L 49-78	4-22 (0-13)	Alico Arena (1,694); Fort Myers, FL
February 15, 2025; 2:00 pm, ESPN+		at Jacksonville; River City Rumble	L 52-63	4-23 (0-14)	Swisher Gymnasium (300); Jacksonville, FL
February 20, 2025; 5:00 pm, ESPN+		Eastern Kentucky	L 58-71	4-24 (0-15)	UNF Arena (209); Jacksonville, FL
February 22, 2025; 2:00 pm, ESPN+		Bellarmine	L 65-93	4-25 (0-16)	UNF Arena (261); Jacksonville, FL
February 27, 2025; 7:00 pm, ESPN+		at Stetson	L 63-71	4-26 (0-17)	Insight Credit Union Arena (364); DeLand, FL
March 1, 2025; 2:00 pm, ESPN+		Jacksonville; River City Rumble	W 69-61	5-26 (1-17)	UNF Arena (501); Jacksonville, FL
*Non-conference game. ^{#}Rankings from AP Poll. (#) Tournament seedings in parentheses. All times are in Eastern.
