= 2024–25 Eastern Kentucky Colonels women's basketball team =

American college basketball season

2024–25 Eastern Kentucky Colonels women's basketball
- Conference: Atlantic Sun Conference
- Record: 21–12 (10–8 ASUN)
- Head coach: Greg Todd (4th season)
- Assistant coaches: Coretta Brown; Veronica Ryan; Chad Gibney
- Home arena: Baptist Health Arena

2024–25 ASUN women's basketball standings
	Conf.				Overall
Team	W		L	PCT	W		L	PCT
Florida Gulf Coast †	18	–	0	1.000	30	–	4	.882
Central Arkansas	15	–	3	.833	23	–	10	.697
Lipscomb	12	–	6	.667	20	–	12	.625
Eastern Kentucky	10	–	8	.556	21	–	12	.636
Stetson	10	–	8	.556	16	–	15	.516
North Alabama	8	–	10	.444	13	–	17	.433
Jacksonville	8	–	10	.444	14	–	17	.452
Bellarmine	8	–	10	.444	18	–	15	.545
West Georgia*	7	–	11	.389	13	–	17	.433
Austin Peay	7	–	11	.389	13	–	18	.419
Queens*	4	–	14	.222	10	–	19	.345
North Florida	1	–	17	.056	5	–	26	.161
† 2025 ASUN tournament winner * ineligible for the 2025 NCAA tournament due to transition from Division II

The 2024–25 Eastern Kentucky Colonels women's basketball team represented Eastern Kentucky University during the 2024–25 NCAA Division I women's basketball season. The Colonels were led by fourth-year head coach Greg Todd. The Colonels played three non-conference home games at the Seabury Center on the campus of Berea College in Berea, Kentucky and two non-conference games at the Clive M. Beck Center on the campus of Transylvania University in Lexington, Kentucky, as their home arena, Baptist Health Arena in Richmond, Kentucky, underwent renovations, with the renovations being completed in time for ASUN conference play. The Colonels finished the season 20–11, 10–8 in ASUN play, to finish in a tie for fourth place. They defeated Stetson before falling to top-seeded and eventual tournament champions Florida Gulf Coast in the semifinals of the ASUN tournament.

== Previous season ==
The Colonels finished the 2023–24 season 22–12, 9–7 in ASUN play, to finish in fifth place. They defeated Lipscomb, before falling to Central Arkansas in the semifinals of the ASUN tournament. They received an at-large bid into the WNIT, where they fell to Purdue Fort Wayne in the first round.

== Roster ==
2024–25 Eastern Kentucky Colonels women's basketball team
Players
Coaches

Pos.	#	Name	Height	Year	Previous school	Hometown
G	2	Love Mays	5 ft 8 in (1.73 m)	So	UT Martin	Harrodsburg, KY
G	3	Savannah Gardner	5 ft 11 in (1.8 m)	Fr	Christian Academy of Louisville	Louisville, KY
G	4	Capria Brown	5 ft 10 in (1.78 m)	RS Sr	Central Michigan	Danville, IL
F	5	Raphaela Toussaint (5Y)	6 ft 0 in (1.83 m)	Sr	Rider	Kingston, ON
G	10	Ambah Kowcun	5 ft 10 in (1.78 m)	GS	Wichita State	Adelaide, Australia
G	11	Althea Kara Angeles (5Y)	5 ft 6 in (1.68 m)	Sr	Old Dominion	Melbourne, Australia
G	20	Kaitlyn Costner	5 ft 8 in (1.73 m)	Sr	Ohio State	Osceola, IN
G	22	Mya Wardle	5 ft 7 in (1.7 m)	Fr	Peoria Notre Dame High School	Peoria, IL
G	23	Bre'Aria Cannon	6 ft 0 in (1.83 m)	Fr	Link Academy	Christiana, TN
F	24	Kailani Lindsey	6 ft 1 in (1.85 m)	So	Foster High School	Wildwood, FL
G	30	Alice Recanati (5Y)	5 ft 9 in (1.75 m)	Sr	Reyer Venezia	Bergamo, Italy
G	31	Liz Freihofer	5 ft 10 in (1.78 m)	Fr	Cooper High School	Union, KY
F	32	Jasmine McGinnis-Taylor (5Y)	6 ft 3 in (1.91 m)	Sr	Illinois State	Omaha, NE
F	50	Faith Walker	6 ft 0 in (1.83 m)	Jr	Western Nebraska	Grand Rapids, MI

Head coach

- Greg Todd (Eastern Kentucky)

Assistant coach(es)

- Coretta Brown (North Carolina)
- Veronica Ryan (Georgia College)
- Chad Gibney (Wichita State)

Legend

- (C) Team captain
- (S) Suspended
- (I) Ineligible
- (W) Walk-on
- (5Y) Fifth-year senior
- Injured
- Current redshirt

Roster
Last update: January 7, 2025

== Schedule and results ==
Date time, TV	Rank^{#}	Opponent^{#}	Result	Record	Site (attendance) city, state
Non-conference regular season
November 4, 2024*; 8:00 p.m., SECN+		at No. 7 LSU	L 44–95	0–1	Pete Maravich Assembly Center (9,822); Baton Rouge, LA
November 8, 2024*; 7:00 p.m., ESPN+		Tennessee State	L 48–66	0–2	Seabury Center (211); Berea, KY
November 10, 2024*; 3:00 p.m., ESPN+		at Southern Illinois	W 70–49	1–2	Banterra Center (483); Carbondale, IL
November 14, 2024*; 6:30 p.m., B1G+		at Michigan State	L 54–96	1–3	Breslin Center (2,631); East Lansing, MI
November 17, 2024*; 3:00 p.m., ESPN+		Southeast Missouri State	W 89–61	2–3	Seabury Center (261); Berea, KY
November 23, 2024*; 2:00 p.m., ESPN+		at Radford	W 87–40	3–3	Dedmon Center (627); Radford, VA
November 25, 2024*; 7:00 p.m., FloHoops		at Hampton	W 69–55	4–3	Hampton Convocation Center (312); Hampton, VA
November 27, 2024*; 2:00 p.m., ESPN+		Maryville	W 101–25	5–3	Seabury Center (167); Berea, KY
November 30, 2024*; 3:30 p.m., ESPN+		at Northern Kentucky	W 84–75	6–3	Truist Arena (1,148); Highland Heights, KY
December 11, 2024*; 11:00 p.m., PacWest Network		at Hawaii–Hilo	W 78–49	7–3	Afook-Chinen Civic Auditorium (244); Hilo, HI
December 16, 2024*; 2:00 p.m., ESPN+		Indiana State	W 89–72	8–3	Clive M. Beck Center (112); Lexington, KY
December 17, 2024*; 6:00 p.m., ESPN+		Northern Illinois	W 76–64	9–3	Clive M. Beck Center (149); Lexington, KY
December 29, 2024*; 3:00 p.m., ESPN+		at Samford	W 81–66	10–3	Pete Hanna Center (237); Homewood, AL
ASUN regular season
January 2, 2025; 7:00 p.m., ESPN+		at Austin Peay	W 72–58	11–3 (1–0)	F&M Bank Arena (382); Clarksville, TN
January 4, 2025; 3:00 p.m., ESPN+		at Lipscomb	L 48–79	11–4 (1–1)	Allen Arena (175); Nashville, TN
January 8, 2025; 7:00 p.m., ESPN+		at West Georgia	L 64–71	11–5 (1–2)	The Coliseum (223); Carrollton, GA
January 11, 2025; 1:00 p.m., ESPN+		North Alabama	W 94–58	12–5 (2–2)	Baptist Health Arena (213); Richmond, KY
January 16, 2025; 7:00 p.m., ESPN+		Austin Peay	L 57–59 ^{OT}	12–6 (2–3)	Baptist Health Arena (203); Richmond, KY
January 18, 2025; 4:00 p.m., ESPN+		Bellarmine	W 91–75	13–6 (3–3)	Baptist Health Arena (310); Richmond, KY
January 23, 2025; 7:00 p.m., ESPN+		at Stetson	L 68–83	13–7 (3–4)	Insight Credit Union Arena; DeLand, FL
January 25, 2025; 2:00 p.m., ESPN+		at Florida Gulf Coast	L 56–86	13–8 (3–5)	Alico Arena (2,017); Fort Myers, FL
January 30, 2025; 7:00 p.m., ESPN+		Jacksonville	W 88–75	14–8 (4–5)	Baptist Health Arena (403); Richmond, KY
February 1, 2025; 1:00 p.m., ESPN+		North Florida	W 78–44	15–8 (5–5)	Baptist Health Arena (296); Richmond, KY
February 6, 2025; 7:00 p.m., ESPN+		Stetson	W 77–70	16–8 (6–5)	Baptist Health Arena (363); Richmond, KY
February 8, 2025; 2:00 p.m., ESPN+		Florida Gulf Coast	L 65–68	16–9 (6–6)	Baptist Health Arena (386); Richmond, KY
February 12, 2025; 7:00 p.m., ESPN+		at Queens	W 75–62	17–9 (7–6)	Curry Arena (268); Charlotte, NC
February 15, 2025; 2:00 p.m., ESPN+		at Bellarmine	W 79–73	18–9 (8–6)	Knights Hall (627); Louisville, KY
February 20, 2025; 5:00 p.m., ESPN+		at North Florida	W 71–58	19–9 (9–6)	UNF Arena; Jacksonville, FL
February 22, 2025; 2:00 p.m., ESPN+		at Jacksonville	L 72–80	19–10 (9–7)	Swisher Gymnasium (457); Jacksonville, FL
February 27, 2025; 7:00 p.m., ESPN+		Central Arkansas	L 59–63	19–11 (9–8)	Baptist Health Arena (397); Richmond, KY
March 1, 2025; 4:00 p.m., ESPN+		Lipscomb	W 83–76	20–11 (10–8)	Baptist Health Arena; Richmond, KY
ASUN tournament
March 8, 2025; 9:00 p.m., ESPN+	(4)	(5) Stetson; Quarterfinals	W 77–60	21–11	Baptist Health Arena (241); Richmond, KY
March 11, 2025; 6:30 p.m., ESPN+	(4)	at (1) Florida Gulf Coast; Semifinals	L 47–63	21–12	Alico Arena (1,534); Fort Myers, FL
*Non-conference game. ^{#}Rankings from AP poll. (#) Tournament seedings in parentheses. All times are in Eastern.
