= 2024–25 Florida State Seminoles women's basketball team =

Intercollegiate basketball season

2024–25 Florida State Seminoles women's basketball

Paradise Jam (Reef Division) Champions

NCAA tournament, Second round
- Conference: Atlantic Coast Conference

Ranking
- Coaches: No. 24
- AP: No. 22
- Record: 24–9 (13–5 ACC)
- Head coach: Brooke Wyckoff (4th season)
- Associate head coach: Bill Ferrara (3rd season)
- Assistant coaches: Morgan Toles (5th season); Desma Thomas Bateast (2nd season); Adam Surguine (5th season); Abigail Yuan (1st season)
- Home arena: Donald L. Tucker Center (Capacity: 12,100)

2024–25 ACC women's basketball standings
| | Conf. | | | | Overall |
| Team | W | | L | PCT | W | | L | PCT |
|---|---|---|---|---|---|---|---|---|
| No. 9 NC State | 16 | – | 2 | .889 | 28 | – | 7 | .800 |
| No. 8 Notre Dame | 16 | – | 2 | .889 | 28 | – | 6 | .824 |
| No. 7 Duke † | 14 | – | 4 | .778 | 29 | – | 8 | .784 |
| No. 22 Florida State | 13 | – | 5 | .722 | 24 | – | 9 | .727 |
| No. 12 North Carolina | 13 | – | 5 | .722 | 29 | – | 8 | .784 |
| Louisville | 13 | – | 5 | .722 | 22 | – | 11 | .667 |
| California | 12 | – | 6 | .667 | 25 | – | 9 | .735 |
| Virginia Tech | 9 | – | 9 | .500 | 19 | – | 13 | .594 |
| Georgia Tech | 9 | – | 9 | .500 | 22 | – | 11 | .667 |
| Virginia | 8 | – | 10 | .444 | 17 | – | 15 | .531 |
| Stanford | 8 | – | 10 | .444 | 16 | – | 15 | .516 |
| Boston College | 6 | – | 12 | .333 | 16 | – | 18 | .471 |
| Syracuse | 6 | – | 12 | .333 | 12 | – | 18 | .400 |
| Clemson | 6 | – | 12 | .333 | 14 | – | 17 | .452 |
| Pittsburgh | 5 | – | 13 | .278 | 13 | – | 19 | .406 |
| Miami (FL) | 4 | – | 14 | .222 | 14 | – | 15 | .483 |
| Wake Forest | 2 | – | 16 | .111 | 9 | – | 20 | .310 |
| SMU | 2 | – | 16 | .111 | 10 | – | 20 | .333 |
† 2025 ACC tournament winner Rankings from AP Poll

The 2024–25 Florida State Seminoles women's basketball team represented Florida State University during the 2024–25 NCAA Division I women's basketball season. They were led by fourth-year head coach Brooke Wyckoff, who previously served as interim head coach for the team during the 2020–21 season. The Seminoles played their home games at the Donald L. Tucker Center on the university's Tallahassee, Florida campus. They competed as members of the Atlantic Coast Conference (ACC).

The Seminoles started off the season ranked nineteenth in the AP poll, but quickly fell out of the rankings after a second game of the season loss to Illinois. Despite going on a seven game winning streak, from November 11 to November 30, the Seminoles did not re-enter the rankings. This run included a win against rival Florida and three straight wins in the Paradise Jam - Reef Division. The Seminoles won the championship with a 95–54 defeat of Gonzaga in the final. After returning from the Virgin Islands, Florida State lost in the ACC–SEC Challenge, 79–77 at Tennessee to end their winning streak. The Seminoles went on a five game winning streak after the Tennessee loss, which included their first three ACC games. The Seminoles were particularly dominant in a 105–74 win on the road at Virginia Tech. The winning streak ended with a trip to face ACC newcomers Stanford and twenty-fourth ranked California. The Seminoles lost both games in California. The team bounced back to go on a six-game winning streak and re-enter the rankings. After an 86–84 upset of thirteenth ranked North Carolina, the Seminoles were ranked twenty-fifth. They ascended to twenty-second before losing to fourteenth ranked NC State and Louisville. Those losses saw them fall out of the rankings before they re-entered at number twenty-four after defeating rival Miami, Pittsburgh, and twentieth ranked Georgia Tech. The Seminoles finished the season with an 86–81 defeat of third-ranked Notre Dame and a 71–57 loss to sixteenth ranked Duke.

The Seminoles finished the regular season 23–7 overall and 13–5 in ACC play to finish in a three-way tie for fourth place. As the fourth seed in the ACC tournament, they earned a bye into the Quarterfinals where they lost to fifth seed and fourteenth ranked North Carolina. They received an at-large invitation to the NCAA tournament and were the six-seed in the Spokane 1 region. They defeated eleven-seed George Mason in the First Round before losing to three-seed and tenth ranked LSU 101–71 to end their season. They finished with an overall record of 24–9. Their 24 wins were the most in Brooke Wyckoff's tenure. Additionally, Ta'Niya Latson was the nation's leading scorer during the season. Makayla Timpson would go on to be drafted in the second round of the WNBA draft.

== Previous season ==
The Seminoles finished the season 23–11 overall and 12–6 in ACC play, to finish in a tie for fifth place. As the sixth seed in the ACC tournament, they defeated fourteenth seed Wake Forest in the second round and third seed Syracuse in the quarterfinals before losing to second seed NC State in the semifinals. They received an at-large invitation to the NCAA tournament, marking the eleventh consecutive year the team has qualified for the tournament. As the ninth seed in the Portland 4 were defeated by eighth seed Alabama in the first round to end their season.

== Off-season ==
=== Departures ===
Departures
| Name | Number | Pos. | Height | Year | Hometown | Reason for departure |
|---|---|---|---|---|---|---|
| Alexis Tucker | 2 | G | 5'11" | Graduate student | Hawthorne, CA | Graduated |
| Sara Bejedi | 4 | G | 5'7" | Graduate student | Helsinki, Finland | Graduated |
| Lucia Navarro | 11 | F | 6'0" | Freshman | Valencia, Spain | Transferred to Oregon State |
| Sakyia White | 22 | F | 6'1" | Junior | Tuscaloosa, AL | Transferred to Louisiana–Monroe |

=== Incoming transfers ===
Incoming transfers
| Name | Number | Pos. | Height | Year | Hometown | Previous school |
|---|---|---|---|---|---|---|
| Raiane Dias Dos Santos | 4 | G | 5'9" | (redshirt) Freshman | São Paulo, Brazil | Gulf Coast State |
| Morelia Chavez | 8 | F | 6'1" | Junior | Morelia, Mexico | Eastern Arizona |
| Sydney Bowles | 11 | G | 6'0" | Junior | Lithonia, GA | Texas A&M |
| Malea Williams | 22 | F | 6'4" | Graduate student | Georgetown, KY | Cincinnati |

=== 2024 recruiting class ===
The Seminoles did not have any incoming freshman in the 2024 class.

== Roster ==
2024–25 Florida State Seminoles women's basketball team
Players
Coaches

| Pos. | # | Name | Height | Year | Previous school | Hometown |
|---|---|---|---|---|---|---|
| G | 00 | Ta'Niya Latson | 5 ft 8 in (1.73 m) | Jr | American Heritage | Miami, FL |
| G | 1 | Brianna Turnage | 6 ft 1 in (1.85 m) | Jr | Westlake | Atlanta, GA |
| G | 3 | O'Mariah Gordon | 5 ft 4 in (1.63 m) | Sr | Braden River | Bradenton, FL |
| G | 4 | Raiane Dias Dos Santos | 5 ft 9 in (1.75 m) | RS Fr | Gulf Coast State | São Paulo, Brazil |
| F | 5 | Mariana Valenzuela | 6 ft 2 in (1.88 m) | RS So | Montverde Academy | Mazatlán, Mexico |
| F | 8 | Morelia Chavez | 6 ft 1 in (1.85 m) | Jr | C.N.A.R. Eastern Arizona | Morelia, Mexico |
| G | 11 | Sydney Bowles | 6 ft 0 in (1.83 m) | Jr | Woodward Academy; Texas A&M | Lithonia, GA |
| G | 13 | Carla Viegas | 5 ft 9 in (1.75 m) | So | CAB Estepona | Málaga, Spain |
| F | 21 | Makayla Timpson | 6 ft 2 in (1.88 m) | Sr | Early County | Edison, GA |
| F | 22 | Malea Williams | 6 ft 4 in (1.93 m) | GS | Scott County; Cincinnati | Georgetown, KY |
| G | 24 | Amaya Bonner | 6 ft 0 in (1.83 m) | Jr | Santa Cruz; California | Fremont, CA |
| F | 32 | Avery Treadwell | 6 ft 3 in (1.91 m) | So | Bearden | Knoxville, TN |

Head coach

- Brooke Wyckoff (Florida State)

Assistant coach(es)

- Bill Ferrara (Florida)
- Morgan Toles (Florida State)
- Desma Thomas Bateast (Miami (FL))
- Adam Surguine (Lancaster Bible College)
- Abigail Yuan (Southern Miss)

Legend

- (C) Team captain
- (S) Suspended
- (I) Ineligible
- (W) Walk-on
- Injured
- Current redshirt

Roster
Last update: August 21, 2024

== Schedule and results ==
| Date time, TV | Rank^{#} | Opponent^{#} | Result | Record | High points | High rebounds | High assists | Site (attendance) city, state |
Exhibition
| October 23, 2024*; 6:00 p.m., ESPN+ | No. 19 | Tampa | W 91–46 | – | 26 – Latson | 11 – Timpson | 4 – Gordon | Donald L. Tucker Center (–); Tallahassee, FL |
| October 30, 2024*; 6:00 p.m., ESPN+ | No. 19 | West Florida | W 93–70 | – | 28 – Timpson | 13 – Timpson | 3 – Latson | Donald L. Tucker Center (–); Tallahassee, FL |
Regular season
| November 4, 2024*; 11:00 a.m., ACCNX/ESPN+ | No. 19 | North Florida | W 119–49 | 1–0 | 27 – Latson | 22 – Timpson | 4 – Tied | Donald L. Tucker Center (4,132); Tallahassee, FL |
| November 7, 2024*; 7:00 p.m., BTN+ | No. 19 | at Illinois | L 74–83 | 1–1 | 27 – Latson | 14 – Timpson | 3 – Tied | State Farm Center (3,741); Champaign, IL |
| November 11, 2024*; 6:00 p.m., ACCNX/ESPN+ | | Florida A&M | W 93–54 | 2–1 | 21 – Latson | 9 – Timpson | 3 – Gordon | Donald L. Tucker Center (2,274); Tallahassee, FL |
| November 14, 2024*; 6:00 p.m., ACCNX/ESPN+ | | Samford | W 101–68 | 3–1 | 38 – Timpson | 15 – Timpson | 5 – Gordon | Donald L. Tucker Center (1,316); Tallahassee, FL |
| November 18, 2024*; 6:00 p.m., ACCNX/ESPN+ | | North Carolina Central | W 119–57 | 4–1 | 34 – Latson | 9 – Timpson | 10 – Latson | Donald L. Tucker Center (1,332); Tallahassee, FL |
| November 22, 2024*; 7:00 p.m., ACCN | | Florida; Rivalry | W 98–74 | 5–1 | 25 – Latson | 11 – Williams | 5 – Latson | Donald L. Tucker Center (2,894); Tallahassee, FL |
| November 28, 2024*; 9:00 p.m., ESPN+ | | vs. Texas Tech; Paradise Jam - Reef Division | W 70–62 | 6–1 | 30 – Latson | 11 – Latson | 1 – Tied | Sports and Fitness Center (1,825); Saint Thomas, USVI |
| November 29, 2024*; 6:30 p.m., ESPN+ | | vs. Missouri State; Paradise Jam - Reef Division | W 97–66 | 7–1 | 21 – Latson | 12 – Timpsom | 5 – Latson | Sports and Fitness Center (N/A); Saint Thomas, USVI |
| November 30, 2024*; 9:00 p.m., ESPN+ | | vs. Gonzaga; Paradise Jam - Reef Division | W 95–54 | 8–1 | 24 – Latson | 10 – Latson | 10 – Latson | Sports and Fitness Center (2,525); Saint Thomas, USVI |
| December 4, 2024*; 7:15 p.m., SECN | | at Tennessee; ACC–SEC Challenge | L 77–79 | 8–2 | 38 – Latson | 11 – Timpson | 3 – Gordon | Thompson–Boling Arena (9,529); Knoxville, TN |
| December 8, 2024; 2:00 p.m., ACCN | | SMU | W 93–85 | 9–2 (1–0) | 39 – Latson | 9 – Timpson | 4 – Turnage | Donald L. Tucker Center (1,731); Tallahassee, FL |
| December 15, 2024*; 2:00 p.m., ACCNX/ESPN+ | | Drexel | W 101–51 | 10–2 | 32 – Latson | 10 – Timpson | 7 – Latson | Donald L. Tucker Center (1,163); Tallahassee, FL |
| December 19, 2024*; 6:00 p.m., ACCNX/ESPN+ | | Jacksonville | W 97–74 | 11–2 | 27 – Timpson | 13 – Timpson | 10 – Gordon | Donald L. Tucker Center (1,445); Tallahassee, FL |
| January 2, 2025; 6:00 p.m., ACCN | | at Virginia Tech | W 105–74 | 12–2 (2–0) | 40 – Latson | 6 – Tied | 8 – Gordon | Cassell Coliseum (5,424); Blacksburg, VA |
| January 5, 2025; 2:00 p.m., ACCN | | Syracuse | W 85–73 | 13–2 (3–0) | 25 – Latson | 11 – Timpson | 7 – Latson | Donald L. Tucker Center (1,849); Tallahassee, FL |
| January 9, 2025; 10:00 p.m., ACCNX/ESPN+ | | at Stanford | L 84–89 | 13–3 (3–1) | 24 – Latson | 8 – Timpson | 4 – Tied | Maples Pavilion (2,660); Stanford, CA |
| January 12, 2025; 5:00 p.m., ACCNX/ESPN+ | | at No. 24 California | L 70–82 | 13–4 (3–2) | 17 – Timpson | 13 – Timpson | 3 – Gordon | Haas Pavilion (2,311); Berkeley, CA |
| January 16, 2025; 6:00 p.m., ACCNX/ESPN+ | | Clemson | W 82–67 | 14–4 (4–2) | 20 – Latson | 13 – Timpson | 10 – Latson | Donald L. Tucker Center (1,336); Tallahassee, FL |
| January 19, 2025; 2:00 p.m., ACCNX/ESPN+ | | Miami (FL) | W 88–66 | 15–4 (5–2) | 30 – Latson | 13 – Timpson | 5 – Tied | Donald L. Tucker Center (2,631); Tallahassee, FL |
| January 26, 2025; 12:00 p.m., ACCN | | at No. 13 North Carolina | W 86–84 | 16–4 (6–2) | 25 – Latson | 11 – Williams | 7 – Latson | Carmichael Arena (4,313); Chapel Hill, NC |
| January 30, 2025; 6:00 p.m., ACCNX/ESPN+ | No. 25 | at Boston College | W 104–80 | 17–4 (7–2) | 21 – Tied | 11 – Timpson | 7 – Latson | Conte Forum (933); Chestnut Hill, MA |
| February 2, 2025; 6:00 p.m., ACCN | No. 25 | Wake Forest | W 97–68 | 18–4 (8–2) | 25 – Latson | 14 – Timpson | 5 – Latson | Donald L. Tucker Center (2,139); Tallahassee, FL |
| February 6, 2025; 7:00 p.m., ACCNX/ESPN+ | No. 22 | at Virginia | W 101–68 | 19–4 (9–2) | 27 – Latson | 8 – Timpson | 12 – Latson | John Paul Jones Arena (4,198); Charlottesville, VA |
| February 9, 2025; 2:00 p.m., The CW | No. 22 | No. 14 NC State | L 74–97 | 19–5 (9–3) | 23 – Latson | 9 – Timpson | 3 – Tied | Donald L. Tucker Center (2,458); Tallahassee, FL |
| February 13, 2025; 6:00 p.m., ACCNX/ESPN+ | No. 23 | Louisville | L 69–83 | 19–6 (9–4) | 29 – Latson | 7 – Tied | 2 – Tied | Donald L. Tucker Center (1,913); Tallahassee, FL |
| February 16, 2025; 2:00 p.m., The CW | No. 23 | at Miami (FL) | W 83–82 | 20–6 (10–4) | 34 – Gordon | 9 – Timpson | 7 – Gordon | Watsco Center (3,477); Coral Gables, FL |
| February 20, 2025; 6:00 p.m., ACCNX/ESPN+ | | Pittsburgh | W 69–55 | 21–6 (11–4) | 20 – Timpson | 10 – Williams | 3 – Dias Dos Santos | Donald L. Tucker Center (1,818); Tallahassee, FL |
| February 23, 2025; 3:00 p.m., ACCNX/ESPN+ | | at No. 20 Georgia Tech | W 73–70 | 22–6 (12–4) | 32 – Bowles | 16 – Timpson | 6 – Bowles | McCamish Pavilion (3,809); Atlanta, GA |
| February 27, 2025; 8:00 p.m., ACCN | No. 24 | at No. 3 Notre Dame | W 86–81 | 23–6 (13–4) | 23 – Latson | 17 – Timpson | 9 – Latson | Joyce Center (8,761); South Bend, IN |
| March 2, 2025; 6:00 p.m., ACCN | No. 24 | No. 16 Duke | L 57–71 | 23–7 (13–5) | 25 – Timpson | 8 – Timpson | 3 – Latson | Donald L. Tucker Center (2,829); Tallahassee, FL |
ACC women's tournament
| March 7, 2025; 11:00 a.m., ESPN2 | (4) No. 22 | vs. (5) No. 14 North Carolina; Quarterfinals | L 56–60 | 23–8 | 15 – Timpson | 8 – Timpson | 5 – Latson | Greensboro Coliseum (16,416); Greensboro, NC |
NCAA women's tournament
| March 22, 2025*; 7:45 p.m., ESPN2 | (6 S1) No. 22 | vs. (11 S1) George Mason; First Round | W 94–59 | 24–8 | 28 – Latson | 11 – Timpson | 6 – Bonner | Pete Maravich Assembly Center (9,288); Baton Rouge, LA |
| March 24, 2025*; 6:00 p.m., ESPN | (6 S1) No. 22 | at (3 S1) No. 10 LSU; Second Round | L 71–101 | 24–9 | 30 – Latson | 9 – Timpson | 5 – Gordon | Pete Maravich Assembly Center (10,329); Baton Rouge, LA |
*Non-conference game. ^{#}Rankings from AP poll. (#) Tournament seedings in parentheses. S1=Spokane 1. All times are in Eastern.

== Rankings ==
Ranking movements Legend: ██ Increase in ranking ██ Decrease in ranking — = Not ranked RV = Received votes
| | Week | | | | | | | | | | | | | | | | | | | | |
| Poll | Pre | 1 | 2 | 3 | 4 | 5 | 6 | 7 | 8 | 9 | 10 | 11 | 12 | 13 | 14 | 15 | 16 | 17 | 18 | 19 | Final |
|---|---|---|---|---|---|---|---|---|---|---|---|---|---|---|---|---|---|---|---|---|---|
| AP | 19 | RV | RV | RV | RV | RV | — | RV | — | RV | RV | — | 25 | 22 | 23 | RV | 24 | 22 | 23 | 22 | 22 |
| Coaches | 19 | RV | RV | RV | RV | RV | RV | RV | RV | 24 | RV | RV | 24 | 22 | 21 | 25 | 24 | 23 | 24 | 24 | 24 |

== Awards ==
=== Watchlists ===
| Player | Watchlist | Ref. |
|---|---|---|
| Ta'Niya Latson | Naismith Trophy; Wooden Award; Wade Trophy; USBWA Player of the Year | |
| Makayla Timpson | Naismith Trophy; Katrina McClain Award; Naismith Defensive Player of the Year | |

=== Honors ===
Honors
| Player | Award | Ref. |
|---|---|---|
| Ta'Niya Latson | Pre-season All-ACC Team; ACC Co-Player of the Week (Week Four); Ann Meyers Drysdale National Player of the Week (Week Four); ACC Player of the Week (Week Five); ACC Player of the Week (Week Nine); Associated Press Player of the Week (Week Nine); Ann Meyers Drysdale National Player of the Week (Week Nine); ACC Player of the Week (Week Eleven); Associated Press Player of the Week (Week Eleven); ACC Player of the Week (Week Twelve); Ann Meyers Drysdale National Player of the Week (Week Twelve); 2024 Paradise Jam Tournament MVP; Naismith Mid-Season Team; All-ACC First Team; Associated Press Second Team All-American; USBWA Second Team All-American; John Wooden All-American; WBCA All-America Honorable Mention; Ann Meyers Drysdale Shooting Guard of the Year finalist Naismith Player of the Year semifinalist Wooden Award semifinalist | |
| Makayla Timpson | Pre-season All-ACC Team; ACC Co-Player of the Week (Week Two); ACC Player of the Week (Week Seventeen); 2024 Paradise Jam All-Tournament Team; All-ACC First Team; All-ACC Defensive Team; ACC All-Tournament Second Team; Associated Press All-American Honorable Mention >WBCA All-America Honorable Mention; Katrina McClain Power Forward of the Year finalist Naismith Women's Defensive Player of the Year semifinalist | |
| O'Mariah Gordon | All-ACC First Team | |

== WNBA draft ==
| Round | Pick (Overall) | Name | Team |
|---|---|---|---|
| 2nd | 19 | Makayla Timpson | Indiana Fever |
