= 2025 ASUN women's basketball tournament =

American college basketball postseason tournament

- Classification: Division I
- Season: 2024–25
- Teams: 10
- Site: Campus sites
- Champions: Florida Gulf Coast (12th title)
- Winning coach: Chelsea Lyles (1st title)
- MVP: Emani Jefferson (Florida Gulf Coast)
- Television: ESPN+

2024–25 ASUN women's basketball standings
| | Conf. | | | | Overall |
| Team | W | | L | PCT | W | | L | PCT |
|---|---|---|---|---|---|---|---|---|
| Florida Gulf Coast † | 18 | – | 0 | 1.000 | 30 | – | 4 | .882 |
| Central Arkansas | 15 | – | 3 | .833 | 23 | – | 10 | .697 |
| Lipscomb | 12 | – | 6 | .667 | 20 | – | 12 | .625 |
| Eastern Kentucky | 10 | – | 8 | .556 | 21 | – | 12 | .636 |
| Stetson | 10 | – | 8 | .556 | 16 | – | 15 | .516 |
| North Alabama | 8 | – | 10 | .444 | 13 | – | 17 | .433 |
| Jacksonville | 8 | – | 10 | .444 | 14 | – | 17 | .452 |
| Bellarmine | 8 | – | 10 | .444 | 18 | – | 15 | .545 |
| West Georgia* | 7 | – | 11 | .389 | 13 | – | 17 | .433 |
| Austin Peay | 7 | – | 11 | .389 | 13 | – | 18 | .419 |
| Queens* | 4 | – | 14 | .222 | 10 | – | 19 | .345 |
| North Florida | 1 | – | 17 | .056 | 5 | – | 26 | .161 |
† 2025 ASUN tournament winner * ineligible for the 2025 NCAA tournament due to transition from Division II

The 2025 ASUN women's basketball tournament was the conference postseason tournament for the Atlantic Sun Conference. The tournament was the 39th year the league has conducted a postseason tournament. The tournament was held March 7–15 at campus sites of the higher seeds. The winner received the conference's automatic bid to the 2025 NCAA Tournament.

== Seeds ==
Ten teams will contest the bracket. All rounds reseed instead of a traditional set bracket; to that end, the 9 and 10 seeds play each other in round 1, and the 7 and 8 seeds do as well, rather than the traditional 7/10 and 8/9 matchup.

The two tiebreakers used by the ASUN are: 1) head-to-head record of teams with identical record and 2) NCAA NET Rankings available on day following the conclusion of ASUN regular season play.

| Seed | School | Conference | Head-to-Head | NET ranking |
|---|---|---|---|---|
| 1 | Florida Gulf Coast | 18–0 | | |
| 2 | Central Arkansas | 15–3 | | |
| 3 | Lipscomb | 12–6 | | |
| 4 | Eastern Kentucky | 10–8 | 1–1 | NET: 173 |
| 5 | Stetson | 10–8 | 1–1 | NET: 270 |
| 6 | North Alabama | 8–10 | | |
| 7 | Jacksonville | 8–10 | | |
| 8 | Bellarmine | 8–10 | | |
| 9 | West Georgia | 7–11 | 2–0 | |
| 10 | Austin Peay | 7–11 | 0–2 | |
| DNQ | Queens | 4–14 | | |
| DNQ | North Florida | 1–17 | | |

== Schedule ==
| Game | Time | Matchup | Score | Television |
First round – Friday, March 7– Campus Sites
| 1 | 6:00 p.m. | No. 10 Austin Peay vs. No. 9 West Georgia | 60–49 | ESPN+ |
| 2 | 7:30 p.m. | No. 8 Bellarmine vs. No. 7 Jacksonville | 80–79^{OT} | ESPN+ |
Quarterfinals – Saturday, March 8 – Campus Sites
| 3 | 6:30 p.m. | No. 10 Austin Peay at No. 1 Florida Gulf Coast | 48–82 | ESPN+ |
| 4 | 3:00 p.m. | No. 5 Stetson at No. 4 Eastern Kentucky | 60–77 | ESPN+ |
| 5 | 7:30 p.m. | No. 8 Bellarmine at No. 2 Central Arkansas | 57–77 | ESPN+ |
| 6 | 3:00 p.m. | No. 6 North Alabama at No. 3 Lipscomb | 64–73 | ESPN+ |
Semifinals – Tuesday, March 11 – Campus Sites
| 7 | 6:30 p.m. | No. 4 Eastern Kentucky at No. 1 Florida Gulf Coast | 47–63 | ESPN+ |
| 8 | 7:30 p.m. | No. 3 Lipscomb at No. 2 Central Arkansas | 65–70 | ESPN+ |
Championship – Saturday, March 15 – Campus Sites
| 9 | 2:00 p.m. | No. 2 Central Arkansas at No. 1 Florida Gulf Coast | 51–68 | ESPN+ |
Game times in EST for the first round and quarterfinals and EDT for the semifinals and championship. Rankings denote tournament seed.

== Bracket ==
First round Friday, March 7
9 | West Georgia | 49
10 | Austin Peay | 60
7 | Jacksonville | 79
8 | Bellarmine | 80*

Quarterfinals; Saturday, March 8
1 | Florida Gulf Coast | 82
10 | Austin Peay | 48
4 | Eastern Kentucky | 77
5 | Stetson | 60
2 | Central Arkansas | 77
8 | Bellarmine | 57
3 | Lipscomb | 73
6 | North Alabama | 64

Semifinals; Tuesday, March 11
1 | Florida Gulf Coast | 63
4 | Eastern Kentucky | 47
2 | Central Arkansas | 70
3 | Lipscomb | 65

Championship; Saturday, March 15
1 | Florida Gulf Coast | 68
2 | Central Arkansas | 51

* denotes overtime period
