= Flowers Hall =

Collegiate sports arena in Florence, Alabama, U.S.

CB&S Bank Arena at Flowers Hall
- "The Bank"
- Interactive map of CB&S Bank Arena at Flowers Hall
- Address: 615 North Pine Street
- Location: Florence, Alabama, U.S.
- Coordinates: 34°48′30″N 87°41′02″W
- Owner: University of North Alabama
- Operator: University of North Alabama
- Capacity: 3,000

Construction
- Opened: 1972

Tenants
- North Alabama Lions (NCAA); Men's basketball (1972–present); Women's basketball (1972–present); Women's volleyball (1972–present)

CB&S Bank Arena at Flowers Hall, built in 1972, is a 3,000 seat multipurpose arena located in Florence, Alabama. It is used primarily for basketball and volleyball, and is the home of the University of North Alabama Lions basketball and volleyball teams.

The first basketball game in the arena was a preseason NBA basketball game between the Boston Celtics and the Atlanta Hawks, with Pete Maravich scoring 42 points to lead the Hawks to a 122–120 win. It has also hosted high school basketball games as well.

The main court at the arena has been replaced four times, most recently in 2018. In 2004 new scorers' tables and scoreboards were installed, including a center-hung scoreboard that replaced the one installed in 1985. Chairback seats were installed in 1989 on the home side and are sold only to season-ticket holders.

In 2018, as part of North Alabama's transition to NCAA Division I, Flowers Hall underwent a $2 million renovation. The renovation included replacing all bleachers, a brand new court, two new video boards, two new scorers' tables, and a new VIP area on the west end of the court.

In 2023, Flowers Hall was renamed CB&S Bank Arena at Flowers Hall as part of a ten-year naming rights deal.

== See also ==
- List of NCAA Division I basketball arenas
