= The Coliseum (West Georgia) =

Multi-purpose arena in Carrollton, Georgia

- Interactive map of The Coliseum
- Location: Carrollton, Georgia
- Coordinates: 33.5761°N 85.1039°W
- Owner: University of West Georgia
- Operator: University of West Georgia
- Capacity: 6,469
- Surface: Hardwood

Construction
- Opened: January 8, 2009

Tenant
- West Georgia Wolves

The Coliseum is a multi-purpose arena in Carrollton, Georgia, USA. It is home to the University of West Georgia Wolves men's and women's basketball and volleyball teams.

In addition to hosting Wolves basketball and volleyball, the arena has gained a reputation as a concert venue, hosting acts such as Ludacris, Cole Swindell and Florida Georgia Line.
