= Farris Center =

Multi-purpose arena in Conway, Arkansas

- Interactive map of Farris Center
- Location: University of Central Arkansas campus, Bruce St, Conway, AR
- Coordinates: 35°4′54″N 92°27′34″W
- Owner: University of Central Arkansas
- Operator: University of Central Arkansas
- Capacity: 5,500 (Basketball)
- Record attendance: 5,297 vs Nicholls State Colonels; Jan 20, 2010

Construction
- Opened: 1972
- Renovated: 2010, 2012

Tenants
- Central Arkansas (Basketball)

The Farris Center is a 6,000-seat multi-purpose arena in Conway, Arkansas. It was built in 1972. It is home to the University of Central Arkansas Bears basketball program.

Renovations to the Farris Center in 2010 included new scoreboards and renovated court including logos. New floor seating was added in 2012.

== See also ==
- List of NCAA Division I basketball arenas
