= 2024–25 Mid-American Conference women's basketball season =

- League: NCAA Division I
- Sport: Basketball
- Teams: 12

Regular season
- League champions: Ball State
- Runners-up: Toledo, Buffalo
- Season MVP: Ally Becki

2025 MAC tournament

Tournament

Mid-American women's basketball seasons
- 2023–24 2025–26

2024–25 Mid-American Conference women's basketball standings
	Conf.				Overall
Team	W		L	PCT	W		L	PCT
Ball State †	16	–	2	.889	27	–	8	.771
Toledo	13	–	5	.722	24	–	9	.727
Buffalo	13	–	5	.722	30	–	7	.811
Kent State	12	–	6	.667	21	–	12	.636
Miami (OH)	11	–	7	.611	19	–	12	.613
Bowling Green	11	–	7	.611	18	–	13	.581
Central Michigan	9	–	9	.500	14	–	17	.452
Western Michigan	8	–	10	.444	12	–	18	.400
Northern Illinois	6	–	12	.333	13	–	17	.433
Akron	4	–	14	.222	10	–	21	.323
Ohio	4	–	14	.222	6	–	23	.207
Eastern Michigan	1	–	17	.056	2	–	27	.069
† 2025 MAC tournament winner

The 2024–25 Mid-American Conference women's basketball season was the season for Mid-American Conference women's basketball teams. It began with practices in October 2024, followed by the start of the 2024–25 NCAA Division I women's basketball season in November. Conference play began in January 2025 and concluded in March 2025. The 2025 MAC tournament was held at Rocket Arena in Cleveland, Ohio for the 25th consecutive season. This was the conference's last season with 12 members as it will see its first change in membership since 2005 with the addition of UMass.

Ball State won the regular season championship with a 16–2 record Ally Becki of Ball State won player of the year. In the 2025 MAC women's basketball tournament, Ball State defeated Western Michigan, Kent State, and Toledo to win their second MAC tournament title, and first since 2009, to advance to the 2025 NCAA tournament. Ally Becki was the tournament MVP.

== Head coaches ==
=== Coaching changes ===
==== Eastern Michigan ====
On December 11, 2023 Eastern Michigan fired Fred Castro after a 1–7 start. Ke'Sha Blanton finished the season as interim coach. On March 28, 2024, Canisius head coach Sahar Nusseibeh was named as the next head coach.

==== Toledo ====
On April 5, 2024, Tricia Cullop left the head coaching position at Toledo after winning three constitutive MAC coach of the year honors to become the head coach at Miami (FL). On April 9, 2024, Monmouth head coach Ginny Boggess was named the new head coach.

=== Coaches ===
Team	Head coach	Previous job	Years at school	Overall record	School record	MAC record	MAC titles	MAC tournament titles	NCAA tournaments	NCAA Final Fours	NCAA championships
Akron	Ryan Gensler	Illinois (Asst.)	2	11–18 (.379)	11–18 (.379)	6–12 (.333)	0	0	0	0	0
Ball State	Brady Sallee	Eastern Illinois	13	373–256 (.593)	237–146 (.619)	137–73 (.652)	0	0	0	0	0
Bowling Green	Fred Chmiel	South Carolina (Asst.)	2	16–15 (.516)†	16–15 (.516)	10–8 (.556)	0	0	0	0	0
Buffalo	Becky Burke	USC Upstate	3	144–85 (.629)	31–30 (.508)	17–19 (.472)	0	0	0	0	0
Central Michigan	Kristin Haynie	Michigan State (Asst.)	2	6–22 (.214)	6–22 (.214)	4–14 (.222)	0	0	0	0	0
Eastern Michigan	Sahar Nusseibeh	Canisius	1	32–60 (.348)	0–0 (–)	0–0 (–)	0	0	0	0	0
Kent State	Todd Starkey	Indiana (Asst.)	9	308–194 (.614)	143–99 (.591)	85–59 (.590)	0	1	1	0	0
Miami	Glenn Box	Indiana (Assoc HC.)	2	73–51 (.589)	9–20 (.310)	6–12 (.333)	0	0	0	0	0
Northern Illinois	Lisa Carlsen	Lewis	10	318–302 (.513)	134–138 (.493)	77–87 (.470)	0	0	0	0	0
Ohio	Bob Boldon	Youngstown State	12	294–229 (.562)	196–141 (.582)	116–84 (.580)	2	1	1	0	0
Toledo	Ginny Boggess	Monmouth	1	54–42 (.563)	0–0 (–)	0–0 (–)	0	0	0	0	0
Western Michigan	Shane Clipfell	Michigan State (Assoc. HC)	13	243–238 (.505)	172–191 (.474)	94–124 (.431)	0	0	0	0	0

Notes:

- Appearances, titles, etc. are from time with current school only.
- Years at school includes 2024–25 season.
- MAC records are from time at current school only.
- All statistics and records are through the beginning of the season.
- †Chmiel's overall record does not include his coaching record at Feather River College and Lassen College because it is unknown to the author.

== Preseason ==
The MAC Men's & Women's Basketball Tip-Off will be held on Tuesday, October 22, 2024. Each team will have their head coach and a student athlete from both the men's and women's basketball team for interviews.

MAC Women's Basketball Preview Coaches & Student-Athletes

- Akron: Head Coach Ryan Gensler & Alexus Mobley (Senior, Guard)
- Ball State: Head Coach Brady Sallee & Ally Becki (Senior, Guard)
- Bowling Green: Head Coach Fred Chmiel & Lexi Fleming (Senior, Guard)
- Buffalo: Head Coach Becky Burke & Chellia Watson (Senior, Guard)
- Central Michigan: Head Coach Kristin Haynie & Lisa Tesson (Senior, Guard)
- Eastern Michigan: Head Coach Sahar Nusseibeh & Sisi Eleko (Junior, Forward)
- Kent State: Head Coach Todd Starkey & Jenna Batsch (Senior, Guard)
- Miami: Head Coach Glenn Box & Katey Richason (Senior, Forward)
- Northern Illinois: Head Coach Lisa Carlsen & Chelby Koker (Grad., Guard)
- Ohio: Head Coach Bob Boldon & Kate Dennis (Senior, Guard)
- Toledo: Head Coach Ginny Boggess & Nan Garcia (Grad., Guard/Forward)
- Western Michigan: Head Coach Shane Clipfell & Hannah Spitzley (Grad., Guard)

=== Preseason women's basketball coaches poll ===
Women's Basketball Preseason Poll
Place	Team	Points	First place votes
1.	Ball State	120	10
2.	Kent State	104	2
3.	Buffalo	98	--
4.	Bowling Green	96	--
5.	Toledo	82	--
T6.	Northern Illinois	64	--
T6.	Ohio	64	--
8.	Miami	44	--
9.	Akron	43	--
10.	Western Michigan	34	--
11.	Eastern Michigan	23	--
12.	Central Michigan	20	--

MAC tournament champions:Ball State (8), Bowling Green (1), Kent State (1), Toledo (1)

=== MAC Preseason All-Conference ===
Honor	Recipient
Preseason All-MAC First Team	Ally Becki, Ball State, Senior
Preseason All-MAC First Team	Amy Velasco, Bowling Green, Senior
Preseason All-MAC First Team	Chellia Watson, Buffalo, Fifth Year
Preseason All-MAC First Team	Jenna Batsch, Kent State, Senior
Preseason All-MAC First Team	Kirsten Lewis-Williams, Buffalo, Sophomore
Preseason All-MAC Second Team	Brooke Stonebraker, Northern Illinois, Graduate Student
Preseason All-MAC Second Team	Erika Porter, Bowling Green, Fifth Year
Preseason All-MAC Second Team	Jaya McClure, Ohio, Junior
Preseason All-MAC Second Team	Madelyn Bischoff, Ball State, Senior
Preseason All-MAC Second Team	Sammi Mikonowicz, Toledo, Graduate Student

== Regular season ==
=== Rankings ===
		Pre	Wk 2	Wk 3	Wk 4	Wk 5	Wk 6	Wk 7	Wk 8	Wk 9	Wk 10	Wk 11	Wk 12	Wk 13	Wk 14	Wk 15	Wk 16	Wk 17	Wk 18	Wk 19	Final
Akron	AP																				
Akron	C																				
Ball State	AP																				
Ball State	C																				
Bowling Green	AP																				
Bowling Green	C																				
Buffalo	AP																				
Buffalo	C																				
Central Michigan	AP																				
Central Michigan	C																				
Eastern Michigan	AP																				
Eastern Michigan	C																				
Kent State	AP																				
Kent State	C																				
Miami	AP																				
Miami	C																				
Northern Illinois	AP																				
Northern Illinois	C																				
Ohio	AP																				
Ohio	C																				
Toledo	AP																				
Toledo	C																				
Western Michigan	AP																				
Western Michigan	C																				

Legend
	Improvement in ranking
	Drop in ranking
	Not ranked previous week
	No change in ranking from previous week
RV	Received votes but were not ranked in Top 25 of poll
т	Tied with team above or below also with this symbol

== Postseason ==
=== Mid–American Tournament ===
Ball State defeated Western Michigan, Kent State, and Toledo to win their second MAC tournament title, and first since 2009, to advance to the 2025 NCAA tournament. Ally Becki was the tournament MVP.

=== NCAA tournament ===
As a 12 seed, Ball State lost to Mississippi in the NCAA Tournament.

=== Women's National Invitation Tournament ===
Buffalo and Miami accepted bids. Buffalo won the WNIT championship over Troy.

== All-MAC Awards ==
=== Mid-American women's basketball weekly awards ===
Week	Player(s) of the Week	School
November 11	Chellia Watson	Buffalo
November 18	Amy Velasco	Bowling Green
November 25	Mya Babbitt; Madelyn Bischoff	Kent State; Ball State
December 2	Sisi Eleko	Eastern Michigan
December 9	Enjulina Gonzalez	Miami
December 16	Brooke Stonebraker	Northern Illinois
December 23	Enjulina Gonzalez {2}	Miami
December 30	Alexus Mobley	Akron
January 6	Ally Becki	Ball State
January 13	Elise Stuck	Ball State
January 20	Enjulina Gonzalez (3)	Miami
January 27	Ally Becki (2)	Ball State
February 3	Jenna Batsch	Kent State
February 10	Alecia Doyle	Northern Illinois
February 17	Ally Becki (3); Chelby Koker	Ball State; Northern Illinois
February 24	Chellia Watson (2)	Buffalo
March 3	Chelby Koker	Northern Illinois
March 10	Alex Richard	Ball State

=== Postseason awards ===
2025 Mid-American Women's Basketball Individual Awards
Award	Recipient(s)
Player of the Year	Ally Becki, Senior, Ball State, Guard
Coach of the Year	Brady Sallee, Ball State
Defensive Player of the Year	Marie Kiefer, Senior, Ball State, Forward
Freshman of the Year	Madi Morson, Freshman, Central Michigan, Guard
Sixth Man Award	Nan Garcia, Graduate Student, Toledo, Guard/Forward

=== All-MAC Honors ===
2025 Mid-American Men's Basketball All-Conference Teams
First Team	Second Team	Third Team	Honorable Mention	All-Defensive	Freshman Team
Nan Garcia, Toledo; Amy Velasco, Bowling Green; Chellia Watson, Buffalo; Enjulina Gonzalez, Miami; Jenna Batsch, Kent State	Alex Richard, Ball State; Kirsten Lewis-Williams, Buffalo; Madi Morson, Central Michigan; Sammi Mikonowicz, Toledo; Sisi Eleko, Eastern Michigan	Chelby Koker, Northern Illinois; Hannah Spitzley, Western Michigan; Kennedi Watkins, Ohio; Lexi Fleming, Bowling Green; Shelbee Brown, Akron	Amber Tretter, Miami; Janae Tyler, Kent State; Kendall Carruthers, Toledo; Marina Asensio, Western Michigan; Paige Kohler, Bowling Green	Ayanna-Sarai Darrington, Central Michigan; Faith Fedd-Robinson, Toledo; Johnea Donahue, Bowling Green; Lexi Carlsen, Northern Illinois; Madi Morson, Central Michigan	Ally Becki, Ball State; Hannah Spitzley, Western Michigan; Johnea Donahue, Bowling Green; Lani Cornfield, Buffalo; Marie Kiefer, Ball State

== See also ==
- 2024–25 Mid-American Conference men's basketball season
