= 2024–25 Eastern Michigan Eagles women's basketball team =

American college basketball season

2024–25 Eastern Michigan Eagles women's basketball
- Conference: Mid-American Conference
- Record: 2–27 (1–17 MAC)
- Head coach: Sahar Nusseibeh (1st season)
- Assistant coaches: Shareese Ulis; Meg Cunningham; Emily Hays; Kayla Jackson
- Home arena: George Gervin GameAbove Center

2024–25 Mid-American Conference women's basketball standings
	Conf.				Overall
Team	W		L	PCT	W		L	PCT
Ball State †	16	–	2	.889	27	–	8	.771
Toledo	13	–	5	.722	24	–	9	.727
Buffalo	13	–	5	.722	30	–	7	.811
Kent State	12	–	6	.667	21	–	12	.636
Miami (OH)	11	–	7	.611	19	–	12	.613
Bowling Green	11	–	7	.611	18	–	13	.581
Central Michigan	9	–	9	.500	14	–	17	.452
Western Michigan	8	–	10	.444	12	–	18	.400
Northern Illinois	6	–	12	.333	13	–	17	.433
Akron	4	–	14	.222	10	–	21	.323
Ohio	4	–	14	.222	6	–	23	.207
Eastern Michigan	1	–	17	.056	2	–	27	.069
† 2025 MAC tournament winner

The 2024–25 Eastern Michigan Eagles women's basketball team represented Eastern Michigan University during the 2024–25 NCAA Division I women's basketball season. The Eagles, led by first-year head coach Sahar Nusseibeh, play their home games at the George Gervin GameAbove Center in Ypsilanti, Michigan as members of the Mid-American Conference.

== Previous season ==
The Eagles finished the 2023–24 season 7–22, 3–15 in MAC play, to finish in last place. They failed to qualify for the MAC tournament, as only the top eight teams qualify.

During the season, on December 11, 2023, the school announced that they would be firing head coach Fred Castro, ending his eighth season with the team, with assistant coach Ke'Sha Blanton being named the interim head coach for the remainder of the season. On March 28, 2024, the school announced that they would be hiring Canisius head coach Sahar Nusseibeh as the team's next head coach.

== Preseason ==
On October 22, 2024, the MAC released the preseason coaches poll. Eastern Michigan was picked to finish 11th in the MAC regular season.

=== Preseason rankings ===
MAC preseason poll
Predicted finish	Team	Votes (1st place)
1	Ball State	120 (10)
2	Kent State	104 (2)
3	Buffalo	98
4	Bowling Green	96
5	Toledo	82
T-6	Northern Illinois	64
T-6	Ohio	64
8	Miami (OH)	44
9	Akron	43
10	Western Michigan	34
11	Eastern Michigan	23
12	Central Michigan	20

MAC tournament champions: Ball State (8), Bowling Green (1), Buffalo (1), Kent State (1), Toledo (1)

=== Preseason All-MAC ===
No Eagles were named to the first or second Preseason All-MAC teams.

== Roster ==
2024–25 Eastern Michigan Eagles women's basketball team
Players
Coaches

Pos.	#	Name	Height	Year	Previous school	Hometown
G	00	Olivia Westphal	5 ft 9 in (1.75 m)	RS Jr	Duquesne	Bethel Park, Pennsylvania
G	1	Olivia Smith	5 ft 5 in (1.65 m)	Jr	South Side High School	Fort Wayne, Indiana
G	2	Mackenzie Amalia	5 ft 5 in (1.65 m)	GS	Canisius	Beaver Falls, Pennsylvania
G	3	Brooklyn Thrash	6 ft 0 in (1.83 m)	Jr	Canisius	Wayne, Ohio
G	4	Olivia DiFranco	5 ft 10 in (1.78 m)	Fr	Midview High School	Elyria, Ohio
G	5	Athina Lexa	5 ft 9 in (1.75 m)	Sr	Canisius	Thessaloniki, Greece
G	11	Chelsea Bishop	5 ft 10 in (1.78 m)	Fr	Grand Blanc High School	Grand Blanc, Michigan
G	12	Dara Capaldi	5 ft 9 in (1.75 m)	RS So	La Lumiere School	East Detroit, Michigan
G	13	Elena Cabello	6 ft 0 in (1.83 m)	RS So	IES Mediterraneo	Málaga, Spain
F	14	Sisi Eleko	6 ft 2 in (1.88 m)	Jr	Canisius	Montreal, Quebec
G	20	Ashley Hassett	5 ft 10 in (1.78 m)	GS	Northeast Community College	Hershey, Nebraska
F	22	Jada Williams	6 ft 1 in (1.85 m)	RS Jr	Saint Peter's	Williamstown, New Jersey
G	23	Kyndal Lewis	5 ft 8 in (1.73 m)	Sr	Belton High School	Belton, Missouri

Head coach

- Sahar Nusseibeh (American)

Assistant coach(es)

- Shareese Ulis (Cincinnati)
- Meg Cunningham (West Chester)
- Emily Hays (Washington & Jefferson)
- Kayla Jackson (Canisius)

Legend

- (C) Team captain
- (S) Suspended
- (I) Ineligible
- (W) Walk-on
- Injured
- Current redshirt

Roster
Last update: March 2, 2025

== Schedule and results ==
Date time, TV	Rank^{#}	Opponent^{#}	Result	Record	High points	High rebounds	High assists	Site (attendance) city, state
Non-conference regular season
November 4, 2024*; 6:30 pm, ESPN+		Texas State; MAC–SBC Challenge	L 71–75	0–1	28 – Eleko	9 – Eleko	12 – Amalia	George Gervin GameAbove Center (1,137); Ypsilanti, MI
November 9, 2024*; 1:00 pm, ESPN+		Alabama A&M	L 57–66	0–2	17 – Eleko	16 – Eleko	4 – Amalia	George Gervin GameAbove Center (1,147); Ypsilanti, MI
November 11, 2024*; 6:30 pm, B1G+		at Michigan State	L 49–95	0–3	25 – Eleko	12 – Eleko	6 – Amalia	Breslin Center (2,515); East Lansing, MI
November 21, 2024*; 6:30 pm, ESPN+		Purdue Fort Wayne	L 49–94	0–4	15 – Eleko	11 – Eleko	3 – Amalia	George Gervin GameAbove Center (1,142); Ypsilanti, MI
November 26, 2024*; 7:00 pm, ESPN+		at Detroit Mercy	L 61–72	0–5	31 – Eleko	14 – Eleko	6 – Amalia	Calihan Hall (369); Detroit, MI
December 1, 2024*; 2:00 pm, ESPN+		Xavier	W 72–60	1–5	23 – Eleko	7 – Eleko	8 – Amalia	George Gervin GameAbove Center (1,387); Ypsilanti, MI
December 15, 2024*; 2:00 pm, ACCNX		at No. 8 Notre Dame	L 49–118	1–6	13 – Smith	5 – Amalia	2 – Smith	Purcell Pavilion (7,936); Notre Dame, IN
December 19, 2024*; 7:30 pm, ESPN+		at UT Rio Grande Valley; UTRGV Holiday Classic	L 66–73 ^{OT}	1–7	18 – Tied	17 – Eleko	3 – Tied	UTRGV Fieldhouse (502); Edinburg, TX
December 20, 2024*; 5:00 pm, ESPN+		vs. Texas A&M–Corpus Christi; UTRGV Holiday Classic	L 52–67	1–8	19 – Eleko	14 – Eleko	6 – Amalia	UTRGV Fieldhouse (42); Edinburg, TX
December 28, 2024*; 2:00 pm, ESPN+		St. Thomas	L 65–81	1–9	15 – Westphal	10 – Eleko	7 – Amalia	George Gervin GameAbove Center (1,127); Ypsilanti, MI
MAC regular season
January 1, 2025; 1:00 pm, ESPN+		Western Michigan	L 51–65	1–10 (0–1)	23 – Eleko	15 – Eleko	8 – Amalia	George Gervin GameAbove Center (1,131); Ypsilanti, MI
January 4, 2025; 7:00 pm, ESPN+		at Bowling Green	L 76–90	1–11 (0–2)	26 – Eleko	7 – Eleko	6 – Amalia	Stroh Center (2,108); Bowling Green, OH
January 8, 2025; 6:30 pm, ESPN+		at Ball State	L 69–101	1–12 (0–3)	18 – Amalia	6 – Tied	3 – Tied	Worthen Arena (2,145); Muncie, IN
January 11, 2025; 1:00 pm, ESPN+		Akron	L 56–61	1–13 (0–4)	17 – Eleko	8 – Eleko	4 – Amalia	George Gervin GameAbove Center (1,118); Ypsilanti, MI
January 15, 2025; 6:30 pm, ESPN+		Buffalo	L 55–77	1–14 (0–5)	16 – Eleko	11 – Eleko	5 – Eleko	George Gervin GameAbove Center (1,132); Ypsilanti, MI
January 18, 2025; 1:00 pm, ESPN+		at Central Michigan	L 64–73	1–15 (0–6)	19 – Amalia	5 – Eleko	4 – Amalia	McGuirk Arena (1,124); Mount Pleasant, MI
January 22, 2025; 6:30 pm, ESPN+		Northern Illinois	L 70–78	1–16 (0–7)	17 – Tied	6 – Eleko	6 – Amalia	George Gervin GameAbove Center (1,068); Ypsilanti, MI
January 25, 2025; 1:00 pm, ESPN+		at Ohio	L 59–69	1–17 (0–8)	25 – Eleko	12 – Eleko	8 – Smith	Convocation Center (630); Athens, OH
January 29, 2025; 7:00 pm, ESPN+		at Kent State	L 59–79	1–18 (0–9)	24 – Eleko	9 – Eleko	4 – Smith	MAC Center (1,239); Kent, OH
February 1, 2025; 2:00 pm, ESPN+		Toledo	L 49–77	1–19 (0–10)	16 – Eleko	12 – Eleko	3 – Smith	George Gervin GameAbove Center (1,055); Ypsilanti, MI
February 5, 2025; 7:00 pm, ESPN+		at Miami (OH)	L 45–68	1–20 (0–11)	11 – Thrash	10 – Thrash	3 – Smith	Millett Hall (384); Oxford, OH
February 8, 2025*; 2:00 pm, ESPN+		at Georgia State; MAC–SBC Challenge	L 43–55	1–21	14 – Eleko	10 – Lewis	3 – Eleko	GSU Convocation Center (1,444); Atlanta, GA
February 15, 2025; 1:00 pm, ESPN+		Ball State	L 69–74	1–22 (0–12)	15 – Tied	12 – Eleko	3 – Tied	George Gervin GameAbove Center (1,408); Ypsilanti, MI
February 19, 2025; 6:30 pm, ESPN+		Central Michigan	L 62–74	1–23 (0–13)	15 – Lewis	4 – Williams	4 – Smith	George Gervin GameAbove Center (1,183); Ypsilanti, MI
February 22, 2025; 2:00 pm, ESPN+		at Northern Illinois	W 76–72	2–23 (1–13)	20 – Eleko	9 – Eleko	3 – Eleko	Convocation Center; DeKalb, IL
February 26, 2025; 6:30 pm, ESPN+		Miami (OH)	L 72–82 ^{OT}	2–24 (1–14)	16 – Thrash	16 – Eleko	5 – Tied	George Gervin GameAbove Center (1,113); Ypsilanti, MI
March 1, 2025; 2:00 pm, ESPN+		at Buffalo	L 54–71	2–25 (1–15)	17 – Smith	7 – Tied	4 – Tied	Alumni Arena (2,386); Amherst, NY
March 5, 2025; 6:00 pm, ESPN+		at Akron	L 53-70	2-26 (1-16)	21 – Eleko	11 – Eleko	2 – Smith	James A. Rhodes Arena; Akron, OH
March 8, 2025; 2:00 pm, ESPN+		Bowling Green	L 67-87	2-27 (1-17)	19 – Eleko	8 – Eleko	3 – Lewis	George Gervin GameAbove Center (1,476); Ypsilanti, MI
*Non-conference game. ^{#}Rankings from AP poll. (#) Tournament seedings in parentheses. All times are in Eastern.
