= 2025 MAC women's basketball tournament =

- Classification: Division I
- Season: 2024–25
- Teams: 8
- Site: Rocket Arena; Cleveland, Ohio
- Champions: Ball State Cardinals (2nd title)
- Winning coach: Brady Sallee (1st title)
- MVP: Ally Becki (Ball State)
- Television: CBSSN, ESPN+
- MAC women's basketball tournaments

2024–25 Mid-American Conference women's basketball standings
	Conf.				Overall
Team	W		L	PCT	W		L	PCT
Ball State †	16	–	2	.889	27	–	8	.771
Toledo	13	–	5	.722	24	–	9	.727
Buffalo	13	–	5	.722	30	–	7	.811
Kent State	12	–	6	.667	21	–	12	.636
Miami (OH)	11	–	7	.611	19	–	12	.613
Bowling Green	11	–	7	.611	18	–	13	.581
Central Michigan	9	–	9	.500	14	–	17	.452
Western Michigan	8	–	10	.444	12	–	18	.400
Northern Illinois	6	–	12	.333	13	–	17	.433
Akron	4	–	14	.222	10	–	21	.323
Ohio	4	–	14	.222	6	–	23	.207
Eastern Michigan	1	–	17	.056	2	–	27	.069
† 2025 MAC tournament winner

The 2025 MAC women's basketball tournament was the postseason basketball tournament for the 2024–25 college basketball season in the Mid-American Conference (MAC). The entire tournament was held at Rocket Arena, in Cleveland, Ohio on March 12 and 14–15, 2025. Ball State defeated Western Michigan, Kent State, and Toledo to win their second MAC tournament title, and first since 2009, to advance to the 2025 NCAA tournament. Ally Becki was the tournament MVP.

== Format ==
As with the 2021, 2022, 2023, and 2024 tournaments, only the top eight teams qualify. The winner of the tournament, Ball State, received the MAC's automatic bid to the 2025 NCAA tournament.

== Venue ==
The 2025 MAC tournament was held at Rocket Arena for the 25th consecutive season. The venue is the home of the Cleveland Cavaliers of the NBA, has a capacity for basketball of 19,432, and is located in downtown Cleveland at One Center Court.

== Seeds ==
Eight out of the 12 MAC teams qualified for the tournament. Teams were seeded by record within the conference, with a tiebreaker system to seed teams with identical conference records.

Seed	School	Conference record	Tiebreaker
1	Ball State	16–2	
2	Toledo	13–5	2–0 vs. Buffalo
3	Buffalo	13–5	0–2 vs. Toledo
4	Kent State	12–6	
5	Miami (OH)	11–7	1–0 vs. Bowling Green
6	Bowling Green	11–7	0–1 vs. Miami (OH)
7	Central Michigan	9–9	
8	Western Michigan	8–10	
DNQ	Northern Illinois	6–12	
DNQ	Akron	4–14	+5 head-to-head point differential
DNQ	Ohio	4–14	-5 head-to-head point differential
DNQ	Eastern Michigan	1–17	

== Schedule ==
Session	Game	Time*	Matchup	Score	Attendance	Television
Quarterfinals – Wednesday, March 12 – Rocket Arena, Cleveland, OH
1	1	11:00 am	No. 1 Ball State vs. No. 8 Western Michigan	82–53		ESPN+
1	2	30 mins after Game 1	No. 4 Kent State vs. No. 5 Miami (OH)	68–61		ESPN+
1	3	30 mins after Game 2	No. 2 Toledo vs. No. 7 Central Michigan	76–58		ESPN+
1	4	30 mins after Game 3	No. 3 Buffalo vs. No. 6 Bowling Green	65–63		ESPN+
Semifinals – Friday, March 14 – Rocket Arena, Cleveland, OH
2	5	10:00 am	No. 1 Ball State vs. No. 4 Kent State	70–53		ESPN+
2	6	30 mins after Game 5	No. 2 Toledo vs. No. 3 Buffalo	56–49		ESPN+
Championship – Saturday, March 15 – Rocket Arena, Cleveland, OH
3	7	11:00 am	No. 1 Ball State vs. No. 2 Toledo	65–58		CBSSN
*Game times in EDT. ()-Rankings denote tournament seeding.

== Bracket ==
Quarterfinals; Wednesday, March 12, 2025
1	Ball State	82
8	Western Michigan	53
4	Kent State	68
5	Miami (OH)	61
2	Toledo	76
7	Central Michigan	58
3	Buffalo	65
6	Bowling Green	63

Semifinals; Friday, March 14, 2025
1	Ball State	70
4	Kent State	53
2	Toledo	56
3	Buffalo	49

Championship; Saturday, March 15, 2025
1	Ball State	65
2	Toledo	58

== All-Tournament team ==
Tournament MVP – Ally Becki, Ball State

Player	Team
Ally Becki	Ball State
Alex Richard	Ball State
Khera Goss	Toledo
Sammi Mikonowicz	Toledo
Chellia Watson	Buffalo

== See also ==
2025 MAC men's basketball tournament
