= Canisius Golden Griffins basketball =

Canisius Golden Griffins basketball may refer to either of the basketball teams that represent Canisius College:

- Canisius Golden Griffins men's basketball
- Canisius Golden Griffins women's basketball
