= 2024–25 Western Michigan Broncos women's basketball team =

American college basketball season

2024–25 Western Michigan Broncos women's basketball
- Conference: Mid-American Conference
- Record: 12–18 (8–10 MAC)
- Head coach: Shane Clipfell (13th season)
- Assistant coaches: Meredith Applin; Quim Gomez; Cierra Bond; Larry Ford
- Home arena: University Arena

2024–25 Mid-American Conference women's basketball standings
	Conf.				Overall
Team	W		L	PCT	W		L	PCT
Ball State †	16	–	2	.889	27	–	8	.771
Toledo	13	–	5	.722	24	–	9	.727
Buffalo	13	–	5	.722	30	–	7	.811
Kent State	12	–	6	.667	21	–	12	.636
Miami (OH)	11	–	7	.611	19	–	12	.613
Bowling Green	11	–	7	.611	18	–	13	.581
Central Michigan	9	–	9	.500	14	–	17	.452
Western Michigan	8	–	10	.444	12	–	18	.400
Northern Illinois	6	–	12	.333	13	–	17	.433
Akron	4	–	14	.222	10	–	21	.323
Ohio	4	–	14	.222	6	–	23	.207
Eastern Michigan	1	–	17	.056	2	–	27	.069
† 2025 MAC tournament winner

The 2024–25 Western Michigan Broncos women's basketball team represented Western Michigan University during the 2024–25 NCAA Division I women's basketball season. The Broncos, led by 13th-year head coach Shane Clipfell, played their home games at University Arena in Kalamazoo, Michigan as members of the Mid-American Conference (MAC).

The Broncos finished the season 12–18, 8–10 in MAC play, to finish in eighth place.

== Previous season ==
The Broncos finished the 2023–24 season 12–13, 7–7 in MAC play, to finish in eighth place. They were defeated by top-seeded Toledo in the quarterfinals of the MAC tournament.

== Preseason ==
On October 22, 2024, the MAC released the preseason coaches poll. Western Michigan was picked to finish tenth in the MAC regular season.

=== Preseason rankings ===
MAC preseason poll
Predicted finish	Team	Votes (1st place)
1	Ball State	120 (10)
2	Kent State	104 (2)
3	Buffalo	98
4	Bowling Green	96
5	Toledo	82
T–6	Northern Illinois	64
T–6	Ohio	64
8	Miami (OH)	44
9	Akron	43
10	Western Michigan	34
11	Eastern Michigan	23
12	Central Michigan	20

MAC tournament champions: Ball State (8), Bowling Green (1), Buffalo (1), Kent State (1), Toledo (1)

=== Preseason All-MAC ===
No Broncos were named to the first or second Preseason All-MAC teams.

== Roster ==
2024–25 Western Michigan Broncos women's basketball team
Players
Coaches

Pos.	#	Name	Height	Year	Previous school	Hometown
G	1	Marina Asensio	5 ft 8 in (1.73 m)	Jr	South Florida	Sabadell, Spain
G	2	Alli Harness	5 ft 6 in (1.68 m)	Fr	Carroll High School	Burlington, IN
G	3	Hannah Spitzley	6 ft 0 in (1.83 m)	GS	Pewamo-Westphalia High School	Westphalia, MI
F	4	De'Ahna Richardson	6 ft 1 in (1.85 m)	RS Jr	Bolingbrook High School	Bolingbrook, IL
G	5	Artemis Kouki	6 ft 0 in (1.83 m)	RS Jr	ACS Athens	Athens, Greece
F	10	D'Myjah Bolds	6 ft 3 in (1.91 m)	Fr	O'Fallon High School	O'Fallon, IL
G	11	Megan Wagner	5 ft 7 in (1.7 m)	GS	Mason High School	Mason, OH
G	12	Alli Carlson	5 ft 6 in (1.68 m)	Jr	East Grand Rapids High School	Grand Rapids, MI
PG	13	Vinyet Morato	5 ft 8 in (1.73 m)	Fr	Joventut Badalona	Barcelona, Spain
C	15	Lauren Audino	6 ft 2 in (1.88 m)	Sr	St. Mary Catholic Secondary School	Welland, ON
G	20	McKenna Macon	5 ft 8 in (1.73 m)	RS Fr	Lawton High School	Lawton, MI
C	23	Evyn Carrier	6 ft 4 in (1.93 m)	RS Fr	Sycamore High School	Sycamore, IL
F	25	Sarah Rekowski	6 ft 3 in (1.91 m)	Fr	Hartland High School	Hartland, MI
G	32	Maggie Stutelberg	5 ft 11 in (1.8 m)	RS Jr	Glenbard West High School	Glen Ellyn, IL
G	33	Nile Muguira Orbe	5 ft 6 in (1.68 m)	So	Lointek Gernika Bizkaia Club	Guernica, Spain

Head coach

- Shane Clipfell (Eastern Michigan)

Assistant coach(es)

- Meredith Applin (Western Michigan)
- Quim Gomez (Autonomous University of Barcelona)
- Cierra Bond (Oakland)
- Larry Ford (Spring Arbor)

Legend

- (C) Team captain
- (S) Suspended
- (I) Ineligible
- (W) Walk-on
- Injured
- Current redshirt

Roster
Last update: March 1, 2025

== Schedule and results ==
Date time, TV	Rank^{#}	Opponent^{#}	Result	Record	High points	High rebounds	High assists	Site (attendance) city, state
Exhibition
October 31, 2024*; 7:00 p.m.		Olivet	W 72–53	–	12 – Carrier	9 – 2 tied	4 – Asensio	University Arena (618); Kalamazoo, MI
Non-conference regular season
November 4, 2024*; 7:00 p.m., ESPN+		Arkansas State; MAC–SBC Challenge	W 61–52	1–0	15 – Spitzley	8 – Spitzley	7 – Asensio	University Arena (658); Kalamazoo, MI
November 10, 2024*; 3:00 p.m., SECN+		at Texas A&M	L 38–86	1–1	10 – Asensio	7 – Carrier	2 – 2 tied	Reed Arena (3,055); College Station, TX
November 12, 2024*; 12:00 p.m., ACCNX		at SMU	L 44–72	1–2	15 – Kouki	9 – Rekowski	2 – 4 tied	Moody Coliseum (2,719); University Park, TX
November 17, 2024*; 5:00 p.m., ESPN+		Michigan State	L 42–79	1–3	15 – Spitzley	5 – Wagner	3 – Morato	University Arena (2,051); Kalamazoo, MI
November 23, 2024*; 1:00 p.m., ESPN+		at Detroit Mercy	L 63–72	1–4	24 – Asensio	5 – Spitzley	4 – Asensio	Calihan Hall (411); Detroit, MI
November 27, 2024*; 12:00 p.m., ESPN+		Cleary	W 70–48	2–4	19 – Spitzley	10 – Bolds	6 – Asensio	University Arena (677); Kalamazoo, MI
December 4, 2024*; 7:00 p.m., ESPN+		at Valparaiso	L 54–67	2–5	14 – Asensio	9 – Carrier	6 – Asensio	Athletics–Recreation Center (234); Valparaiso, IN
December 7, 2024*; 1:00 p.m., ESPN+		Loyola Chicago	L 46–57	2–6	16 – Carlson	7 – Spitzley	5 – Asensio	University Arena (682); Kalamazoo, MI
December 17, 2024*; 7:00 p.m., ESPN+		Prairie View A&M	W 87–58	3–6	17 – Spitzley	7 – Asensio	6 – Asensio	University Arena (695); Kalamazoo, MI
December 21, 2024*; 2:00 p.m., ESPN+		at Purdue Fort Wayne	L 75–83	3–7	25 – Spitzley	7 – Spitzley	7 – Asensio	Gates Sports Center (518); Fort Wayne, IN
MAC regular season
January 1, 2025; 1:00 p.m., ESPN+		at Eastern Michigan	W 65–51	4–7 (1–0)	22 – Asensio	8 – Spitzley	7 – Carlson	George Gervin GameAbove Center (1,131); Ypsilanti, MI
January 4, 2025; 2:30 p.m., ESPN+		Miami (OH)	L 51–57	4–8 (1–1)	16 – Asensio	7 – Spitzley	4 – Asensio	University Arena (1,075); Kalamazoo, MI
January 8, 2025; 7:00 p.m., ESPN+		Ohio	W 66–49	5–8 (2–1)	18 – Spitzley	6 – Asensio	7 – Asensio	University Arena (647); Kalamazoo, MI
January 11, 2025; 2:00 p.m., ESPN+		at Northern Illinois	W 61–57	6–8 (3–1)	20 – Spitzley	6 – Spitzley	4 – Asensio	Convocation Center (940); DeKalb, IL
January 15, 2025; 7:00 p.m., ESPN+		Toledo	W 41–38	7–8 (4–1)	14 – Spitzley	10 – Spitzley	4 – Asensio	University Arena (711); Kalamazoo, MI
January 18, 2025; 1:00 p.m., ESPN+		at Kent State	L 50–80	7–9 (4–2)	18 – Spitzley	3 – Richardson	8 – Asensio	MAC Center (2,448); Kent, OH
January 22, 2025; 7:00 p.m., ESPN+		at Bowling Green	W 63–60	8–9 (5–2)	19 – Asensio	6 – Carlson	7 – Asensio	Stroh Center (1,535); Bowling Green, OH
January 25, 2025; 1:00 p.m., ESPN+		Central Michigan	L 70–81	8–10 (5–3)	22 – Spitzley	6 – Spitzley	5 – 2 tied	University Arena (1,257); Kalamazoo, MI
January 29, 2025; 11:00 a.m., ESPN+		Buffalo	L 40–73	8–11 (5–4)	11 – Carrier	6 – Carrier	3 – 2 tied	University Arena (723); Kalamazoo, MI
February 1, 2025; 1:00 p.m., ESPN+		at Ball State	L 51–61	8–12 (5–5)	17 – Asensio	7 – Asensio	3 – 2 tied	Worthen Arena (2,025); Muncie, IN
February 5, 2025; 6:00 p.m., ESPN+		at Akron	W 70–64	9–12 (6–5)	22 – Spitzley	4 – 4 tied	5 – Asensio	James A. Rhodes Arena (291); Akron, OH
February 8, 2025*; 3:00 p.m., ESPN+		at Texas State; MAC–SBC Challenge	W 59–50	10–12	13 – Asensio	5 – Audino	6 – Asensio	Strahan Arena (644); San Marcos, TX
February 15, 2025; 12:00 p.m., ESPN+		Northern Illinois	L 51–60	10–13 (6–6)	11 – Carlson	7 – Spitzley	3 – 2 tied	University Arena (791); Kalamazoo, MI
February 19, 2025; 7:00 p.m., ESPN+		Bowling Green	L 63–70	10–14 (6–7)	17 – Spitzley	6 – Spitzley	7 – Asensio	University Arena (734); Kalamazoo, MI
February 22, 2025; 1:00 p.m., ESPN+		at Central Michigan	L 43–56	10–15 (6–8)	20 – Spitzley	7 – Spitzley	2 – 2 tied	McGuirk Arena (1,226); Mount Pleasant, MI
February 26, 2025; 7:00 p.m., ESPN+		Akron	W 77–66	11–15 (7–8)	26 – Asensio	7 – Spitzley	7 – Asensio	University Arena (321); Kalamazoo, MI
March 1, 2025; 1:00 p.m., ESPN+		Ball State	L 45–55	11–16 (7–9)	19 – Spitzley	6 – Spitzley	3 – Asensio	University Arena (720); Kalamazoo, MI
March 5, 2025; 7:00 p.m., ESPN+		at Ohio	W 75-56	12-16 (8-9)	18 – Stutelberg	10 – Carlson	8 – Asensio	Convocation Center (765); Athens, OH
March 8, 2025; 2:00 p.m., ESPN+		at Buffalo	L 54-80	12-17 (8-10)	10 – Wagner	6 – Spitzley	6 – Asensio	Alumni Arena (2008); Amherst, NY
MAC tournament
March 12–15, 2025; 11:00 A.M., ESPN+/CBSSN	(8)	vs. (1) Ball State	L 53-82	12-18	22 – Asensio	10 – Spitzley	5 – Asensio	Rocket Arena; Cleveland, OH
*Non-conference game. ^{#}Rankings from AP poll. (#) Tournament seedings in parentheses. All times are in Eastern.
