= Sahar Nusseibeh =

American basketball player and coach (born 1987)

Current position
- Title: Head coach
- Team: Eastern Michigan
- Conference: MAC
- Record: 15–43 (.259)

Biographical details
- Born: May 7, 1987 (age 39); Uniontown, Ohio, U.S.
- Education: American University

Playing career
- 2005–2009: American

Coaching career (HC unless noted)
- 2009–2011: Cincinnati (GA)
- 2011–2013: Holy Cross (asst.)
- 2013–2016: Bowling Green (asst.)
- 2016–2019: Manhattan (AHC)
- 2019–2021: Miami (OH) (asst.)
- 2021–2024: Canisius
- 2024–present: Eastern Michigan

Head coaching record
- Overall: 47–103 (.313)

Accomplishments and honors

Awards
- As a player: Patriot All-Freshman Team (2006)

Sahar Nusseibeh (born May 7, 1987) is an American women's basketball head coach and former player. She is the current head coach of the Eastern Michigan University women's basketball team. She previously served as the head coach at Canisius University.

== Early life and education ==
Nusseibeh is from Uniontown, Ohio. She attended North Canton High School in North Canton, Ohio where she played high school basketball. She played college basketball for American University from 2005 through 2009 where she received her bachelor's degree in international business. She earned an MBA from the University of Cincinnati in 2011.

== Career statistics ==
Year	Team	GP	GS	MPG	FG%	3P%	FT%	RPG	APG	SPG	BPG	TO	PPG
2005–06	American	28	-	26.5	49.8	0.0	57.0	5.1	0.5	0.7	0.5	1.7	8.8
2006–07	American	31	-	17.0	46.3	0.0	69.7	3.5	0.3	0.5	0.6	1.2	4.8
2007–08	American	30	-	12.4	55.4	0.0	60.5	2.5	0.2	0.4	0.4	1.1	4.2
2008–09	American	27	-	9.7	46.2	0.0	31.6	1.8	0.1	0.2	0.4	0.6	2.0
Career		116	-	16.4	49.5	0.0	57.4	3.2	0.3	0.4	0.5	1.2	4.9
Statistics retrieved from Sports-Reference.

== Coaching career ==
She had WNBA internships with the Atlanta Dream in 2007 and the Washington Mystics 2009 before becoming a graduate assistant for the Cincinnati Bearcats from 2011 through 2013. Her first job as at assistant coach was with Holy Cross from 2011 to 2013. She spent three years each as an assistant at both Bowling Green and Manhattan, and two at Miami (OH) before landing her first head coaching job.

=== Canisius ===
On July 23, 2021, She was named the head coach at Canisius. She led the Golden Griffins to a 32–60 record over three seasons. Their 17–14 record in her final season was Canisius's first winning record since 2009.

=== Eastern Michigan ===
On March 28, 2024, She was named the ninth head coach at Eastern Michigan.

== Head coaching record ==
=== College ===
Record table
Season	Team	Overall	Conference	Standing	Postseason
Canisius (Metro Atlantic Athletic Conference) (2021–2024)
2021–22	Canisius	6–25	3–17	11th	
2022–23	Canisius	9–21	6–14	10th	
2023–24	Canisius	17–14	11–9	T–4th	
Canisius:		32–60 (.348)	20–40 (.333)		
Eastern Michigan (Mid-American Conference) (2024–present)
2024–25	Eastern Michigan	2–27	1–17	12th	
2025–26	Eastern Michigan	13–16	6–12	9th	
Eastern Michigan:		15–43 (.259)	7–29 (.194)		
Total:		46–103 (.309)			
National champion Postseason invitational champion Conference regular season champion Conference regular season and conference tournament champion Division regular season champion Division regular season and conference tournament champion Conference tournament champion
