= 2024–25 Central Michigan Chippewas women's basketball team =

American college basketball season

2024–25 Central Michigan Chippewas women's basketball
- Conference: Mid-American Conference
- Record: 12–16 (7–9 MAC)
- Head coach: Kristin Haynie (2nd season)
- Assistant coaches: Chelsie Butler; Toccara Ross; Jenna Allen
- Home arena: McGuirk Arena

2024–25 Mid-American Conference women's basketball standings
	Conf.				Overall
Team	W		L	PCT	W		L	PCT
Ball State †	16	–	2	.889	27	–	8	.771
Toledo	13	–	5	.722	24	–	9	.727
Buffalo	13	–	5	.722	30	–	7	.811
Kent State	12	–	6	.667	21	–	12	.636
Miami (OH)	11	–	7	.611	19	–	12	.613
Bowling Green	11	–	7	.611	18	–	13	.581
Central Michigan	9	–	9	.500	14	–	17	.452
Western Michigan	8	–	10	.444	12	–	18	.400
Northern Illinois	6	–	12	.333	13	–	17	.433
Akron	4	–	14	.222	10	–	21	.323
Ohio	4	–	14	.222	6	–	23	.207
Eastern Michigan	1	–	17	.056	2	–	27	.069
† 2025 MAC tournament winner

The 2024–25 Central Michigan Chippewas women's basketball team represented Central Michigan University during the 2024–25 NCAA Division I women's basketball season. The Chippewas, led by second-year head coach Kristin Haynie, played their home games at McGuirk Arena in Mount Pleasant, Michigan as members of the Mid-American Conference (MAC).

== Previous season ==
The Chippewas finished the 2023–24 season 6–22, 4–14 in MAC play, to finish in 11th place. They failed to qualify for the MAC tournament, as only the top eight teams qualify.

== Preseason ==
On October 22, 2024, the MAC released the preseason coaches poll. Central Michigan was picked to finish last in the MAC regular season.

=== Preseason rankings ===
MAC preseason poll
Predicted finish	Team	Votes (1st place)
1	Ball State	120 (10)
2	Kent State	104 (2)
3	Buffalo	98
4	Bowling Green	96
5	Toledo	82
T-6	Northern Illinois	64
T-6	Ohio	64
8	Miami (OH)	44
9	Akron	43
10	Western Michigan	34
11	Eastern Michigan	23
12	Central Michigan	20

MAC tournament champions: Ball State (8), Bowling Green (1), Buffalo (1), Kent State (1), Toledo (1)

=== Preseason All-MAC ===
No Chippewas were named to the first or second Preseason All-MAC teams.

== Roster ==
2024–25 Central Michigan Chippewas women's basketball team
Players
Coaches

Pos.	#	Name	Height	Year	Previous school	Hometown
G	0	Madi Morson	5 ft 8 in (1.73 m)	Fr	Salem High School	Canton, MI
G	1	Lisa Tesson	5 ft 7 in (1.7 m)	Sr	Royal Crown School	Montreal, QC
C	3	Desrae Kyles	6 ft 5 in (1.96 m)	So	Benton Harbor High School	Benton Harbor, MI
G	5	Mayla Ham	5 ft 11 in (1.8 m)	So	Georgetown	Detroit, MI
G	6	Amaya Smith	5 ft 7 in (1.7 m)	Fr	Powers Catholic High School	Flint, MI
G	8	Jess Lawson	5 ft 7 in (1.7 m)	Sr	Illinois–Springfield	Las Vegas, NV
F	12	Riley Smith	6 ft 2 in (1.88 m)	Fr	Archbishop Alter High School	Miamisburg, OH
G	22	Satori Griffin	5 ft 9 in (1.75 m)	RS Jr	Mid Michigan College	Mount Pleasant, MI
F	23	Demetria Prewitt	5 ft 10 in (1.78 m)	Jr	Kirkwood Community College	Madison, WI
G	24	Taylor Anderson	5 ft 10 in (1.78 m)	Jr	South Lyon East High School	South Lyon, MI
F	25	Ayanna-Sarai Darrington	6 ft 2 in (1.88 m)	Fr	Frederick Douglass High School	Lexington, KY
G	30	Jayda Mosley	5 ft 7 in (1.7 m)	Fr	Purcell Marian High School	Cincinnati, OH
C	40	Taylor Johnson	6 ft 3 in (1.91 m)	So	College of Southern Idaho	Cannon Falls, MN
C	52	Natalie Lathrop	6 ft 3 in (1.91 m)	Jr	Nevada	Tualatin, OR

Head coach

- Kristin Haynie (Michigan State)

Assistant coach(es)

- Chelsie Butler (Marquette)
- Toccara Ross (Iowa State)
- Jenna Allen (Michigan State)

Legend

- (C) Team captain
- (S) Suspended
- (I) Ineligible
- (W) Walk-on
- Injured
- Current redshirt

Roster
Last update: February 28, 2025

== Schedule and results ==
Date time, TV	Rank^{#}	Opponent^{#}	Result	Record	High points	High rebounds	High assists	Site (attendance) city, state
Exhibition
October 30, 2024*; 6:30 p.m.		Saginaw Valley	W 71–64	–	–	–	–	McGuirk Arena; Mount Pleasant, MI
Non-conference regular season
November 4, 2024*; 6:30 p.m., ESPN+		Coastal Carolina; MAC–SBC Challenge	L 62–65	0–1	13 – Morson	10 – 2 tied	3 – Lawson	McGuirk Arena (1,080); Mount Pleasant, MI
November 14, 2024*; 7:00 p.m., B1G+		at Michigan	L 62–99	0–2	13 – R. Smith	6 – Lawson	4 – 2 tied	Crisler Center (2,423); Ann Arbor, MI
November 17, 2024*; 1:00 p.m., ESPN+		Bradley	L 57–66	0–3	9 – 2 tied	8 – Lawson	4 – Tesson	McGuirk Arena (1,019); Mount Pleasant, MI
November 24, 2024*; 1:00 p.m., ESPN+		Oakland	L 65–76	0–4	14 – Lawson	8 – 2 tied	4 – Lawson	McGuirk Arena (1,042); Mount Pleasant, MI
November 29, 2024*; 4:00 p.m., MWN		at Nevada; Nugget Classic	W 60–57	1–4	19 – Lawson	14 – Lawson	3 – Lawson	Lawlor Events Center; Reno, NV
November 30, 2024*; 6:00 p.m., MWN		vs. Portland; Nugget Classic	L 58–68	1–5	18 – Morson	7 – Lawson	3 – Prewitt	Lawlor Events Center; Reno, NV
December 1, 2024*; 2:00 p.m., MWN		vs. Southern Utah; Nugget Classic	W 70–61	2–5	20 – Morson	9 – Darrington	2 – 2 tied	Lawlor Events Center; Reno, NV
December 4, 2024*; 6:30 p.m., ESPN+		Concordia–Ann Arbor	W 68–57	3–5	17 – Morson	14 – Darrington	6 – Lawson	McGuirk Arena (1,071); Mount Pleasant, MI
December 8, 2024*; 1:00 p.m., ESPN+		at No. 20 Iowa State	L 56–82	3–6	11 – Mosley	6 – Lawson	7 – Lawson	Hilton Coliseum (10,103); Ames, IA
December 15, 2024*; 1:00 p.m., ESPN+		at Dayton	L 68–72	3–7	32 – Morson	7 – R. Smith	5 – Tesson	UD Arena (1,616); Dayton, OH
December 22, 2024*; 1:00 p.m., ESPN+		Milwaukee	W 54–50	4–7	12 – Morson	7 – Lawson	3 – Tesson	McGuirk Arena (990); Mount Pleasant, MI
MAC regular season
January 1, 2025; 2:00 p.m., ESPN+		at Buffalo	L 55–81	4–8 (0–1)	15 – Prewitt	9 – Prewitt	3 – Anderson	Alumni Arena (2,001); Amherst, NY
January 4, 2025; 1:00 p.m., ESPN+		at Ball State	L 61–72	4–9 (0–2)	18 – Morson	8 – Lawson	2 – 3 tied	Worthen Arena (1,704); Muncie, IN
January 8, 2025; 6:30 p.m., ESPN+		Miami (OH)	W 47–46	5–9 (1–2)	11 – Morson	9 – Lawson	2 – 2 tied	McGuirk Arena (971); Mount Pleasant, MI
January 11, 2025; 1:00 p.m., ESPN+		Toledo	L 66–71	5–10 (1–3)	19 – 2 tied	8 – Lawson	4 – Tesson	McGuirk Arena (1,162); Mount Pleasant, MI
January 15, 2025; 6:00 p.m., ESPN+		at Akron	W 75–55	6–10 (2–3)	18 – Lawson	11 – Lawson	2 – 2 tied	James A. Rhodes Arena (312); Akron, OH
January 18, 2025; 1:00 p.m., ESPN+		Eastern Michigan	W 73–64	7–10 (3–3)	16 – Morson	8 – Lawson	8 – Lawson	McGuirk Arena (1,124); Mount Pleasant, MI
January 22, 2025; 11:00 a.m., ESPN+		Kent State	L 56–77	7–11 (3–4)	14 – Lawson	5 – Anderson	2 – 2 tied	McGuirk Arena (1,510); Mount Pleasant, MI
January 25, 2025; 1:00 p.m., ESPN+		at Western Michigan	W 81–70	8–11 (4–4)	25 – Morson	10 – Darrington	8 – Tesson	University Arena (1,257); Kalamazoo, MI
January 29, 2025; 7:00 p.m., ESPN+		at Northern Illinois	L 75–80	8–12 (4–5)	26 – Morson	18 – Lawson	5 – Lawson	Convocation Center (707); DeKalb, IL
February 1, 2025; 1:00 p.m., ESPN+		Bowling Green	L 69–76	8–13 (4–6)	23 – Morson	11 – Lawson	4 – Anderson	McGuirk Arena (1,232); Mount Pleasant, MI
February 5, 2025; 6:30 p.m., ESPN+		Ohio	W 75–48	9–13 (5–6)	24 – Morson	12 – Darrington	10 – Lawson	McGuirk Arena (1,061); Mount Pleasant, MI
February 8, 2025*; 1:00 p.m., ESPN+		at Marshall; MAC–SBC Challenge	W 73–68	10–13	22 – 2 tied	14 – Lawson	4 – Lawson	Cam Henderson Center (1,449); Huntington, WV
February 15, 2025; 2:00 p.m., ESPN+		at Bowling Green	L 55–70	10–14 (5–7)	13 – Lawson	10 – Darrington	3 – 2 tied	Stroh Center (2,225); Bowling Green, OH
February 19, 2025; 6:30 p.m., ESPN+		at Eastern Michigan	W 74–62	11–14 (6–7)	20 – Darrington	8 – 2 tied	4 – Anderson	George Gervin GameAbove Center (1,183); Ypsilanti, MI
February 22, 2025; 1:00 p.m., ESPN+		Western Michigan	W 56–43	12–14 (7–7)	26 – Morson	10 – Prewitt	4 – Lawson	McGuirk Arena (1,226); Mount Pleasant, MI
February 26, 2025; 6:30 p.m., ESPN+		Ball State	L 58–60 ^{OT}	12–15 (7–8)	26 – Morson	21 – Darrington	4 – 2 tied	McGuirk Arena (1,050); Mount Pleasant, MI
March 1, 2025; 2:00 p.m., ESPN+		at Toledo	L 70–80	12–16 (7–9)	23 – Darrington	13 – Darrington	5 – Anderson	Savage Arena (4,532); Toledo, OH
March 5, 2025; 7:00 p.m., ESPN+		at Miami (OH)						Millett Hall; Oxford, OH
March 8, 2025; 1:00 p.m., ESPN+		Akron						McGuirk Arena; Mount Pleasant, MI
MAC tournament
March 12–15, 2025; ESPN+/CBSSN		vs. TBD						Rocket Arena; Cleveland, OH
*Non-conference game. ^{#}Rankings from AP poll. (#) Tournament seedings in parentheses. All times are in Eastern.
