= 2024–25 Bowling Green Falcons women's basketball team =

American college basketball season

2024–25 Bowling Green Falcons women's basketball
- Conference: Mid-American Conference
- Record: 18–13 (11–7 MAC)
- Head coach: Fred Chmiel (2nd season)
- Assistant coaches: Maggie Lucas; John Nicolais; Lexxus Graham-Blincoe
- Home arena: Stroh Center

2024–25 Mid-American Conference women's basketball standings
	Conf.				Overall
Team	W		L	PCT	W		L	PCT
Ball State †	16	–	2	.889	27	–	8	.771
Toledo	13	–	5	.722	24	–	9	.727
Buffalo	13	–	5	.722	30	–	7	.811
Kent State	12	–	6	.667	21	–	12	.636
Miami (OH)	11	–	7	.611	19	–	12	.613
Bowling Green	11	–	7	.611	18	–	13	.581
Central Michigan	9	–	9	.500	14	–	17	.452
Western Michigan	8	–	10	.444	12	–	18	.400
Northern Illinois	6	–	12	.333	13	–	17	.433
Akron	4	–	14	.222	10	–	21	.323
Ohio	4	–	14	.222	6	–	23	.207
Eastern Michigan	1	–	17	.056	2	–	27	.069
† 2025 MAC tournament winner

The 2024–25 Bowling Green Falcons women's basketball team represented Bowling Green State University during the 2024–25 NCAA Division I women's basketball season. The Falcons, led by second-year head coach Fred Chmiel, played their home games at the Stroh Center in Bowling Green, Ohio as members of the Mid-American Conference.

== Previous season ==
The Falcons finished the 2023–24 season 16–15, 10–8 in MAC play, to finish in a tie for fourth place. They were defeated by Buffalo in the quarterfinals of the MAC tournament. They received an at-large bid to the WNIT, where they would be defeated by Butler in the first round.

== Preseason ==
On October 22, 2024, the MAC released the preseason coaches poll. Bowling Green was picked to finish fourth in the MAC regular season. Bowling Green received 1 vote to win the MAC Tournament.

=== Preseason rankings ===
MAC preseason poll
Predicted finish	Team	Votes (1st place)
1	Ball State	120 (10)
2	Kent State	104 (2)
3	Buffalo	98
4	Bowling Green	96
5	Toledo	82
T-6	Northern Illinois	64
T-6	Ohio	64
8	Miami (OH)	44
9	Akron	43
10	Western Michigan	34
11	Eastern Michigan	23
12	Central Michigan	20

MAC tournament champions: Ball State (8), Bowling Green (1), Buffalo (1), Kent State (1), Toledo (1)

=== Preseason All-MAC ===
Preseason All-MAC teams
Team	Player	Year
1st	Amy Velasco	Senior
2nd	Erika Porter	Fifth year

== Roster ==
2024–25 Bowling Green Falcons women's basketball team
Players
Coaches

Pos.	#	Name	Height	Year	Previous school	Hometown
G/F	0	Laila Harrison	6 ft 1 in (1.85 m)	Fr	Mount Notre Dame High School	Cincinnati, Ohio
G	1	Amy Velasco	5 ft 7 in (1.7 m)	Sr	Centerville High School	Centerville, Ohio
G	2	Emily Siesel	5 ft 6 in (1.68 m)	Jr	Buckeye Central High School	New Washington, Ohio
G	3	Johnea Donahue	5 ft 8 in (1.73 m)	Fr	Snider High School	Fort Wayne, Indiana
G/F	4	Kristiana Kulackovska	6 ft 0 in (1.83 m)	Jr	Eastern Florida State College	Saldus, Latvia
G	5	Taylor Wallace	5 ft 6 in (1.68 m)	Fr	Arbor Prep	Shelby Township, Michigan
G	10	Paige Kohler	5 ft 8 in (1.73 m)	So	Olmsted Falls High School	Olmsted Falls, Ohio
F	11	Taya Ellis	6 ft 1 in (1.85 m)	So	Royal Crown School	Toronto, Ontario
G/F	14	Keiryn McGuff	6 ft 0 in (1.83 m)	So	Dublin Coffman High School	Dublin, Ohio
G	20	Jasmine Fearne	6 ft 0 in (1.83 m)	RS So	Hickory Ridge High School	Cairns, Australia
F	22	Lauren Gerken	6 ft 1 in (1.85 m)	Fr	Liberty-Benton High School	Findlay, Ohio
G	25	Lexi Fleming (5Y)	5 ft 5 in (1.65 m)	Sr	Mercy McAuley High School	Cincinnati, Ohio
F	32	Erika Porter (5Y)	6 ft 2 in (1.88 m)	Sr	Baylor	West Windsor, New Jersey
F	33	Kendal Moxey	6 ft 3 in (1.91 m)	Jr	Daytona State College	Centreville, Maryland
F		Sofia Moschen	6 ft 2 in (1.88 m)	Fr	Centro Educational Leonardo Da Vinci	São Paulo, Brazil

Head coach

- Fred Chmiel (Excelsior)

Assistant coach(es)

- Maggie Lucas (Penn State)
- John Nicolais (Glenville State)
- Lexxus Graham-Blincoe (Campbellsville)

Legend

- (C) Team captain
- (S) Suspended
- (I) Ineligible
- (W) Walk-on
- (5Y) Fifth-year senior
- Injured
- Current redshirt

Roster
Last update: February 27, 2025

== Schedule and results ==
Date time, TV	Rank^{#}	Opponent^{#}	Result	Record	High points	High rebounds	High assists	Site (attendance) city, state
Exhibition
October 29, 2024*; 11:00 am, ESPN+		Wittenberg	W 102–47	–	25 – Porter	7 – Ellis	4 – Velasco	Stroh Center (1,548); Bowling Green, OH
Non-conference regular season
November 4, 2024*; 7:00 pm, ESPN+		Southern Miss; MAC–SBC Challenge	W 71–67	1–0	19 – Kohler	9 – Ellis	6 – Velasco	Stroh Center (1,786); Bowling Green, OH
November 8, 2024*; 7:00 pm, ESPN+		at Detroit Mercy	L 66–73	1–1	20 – Velasco	9 – Ellis	3 – Velasco	Calihan Hall (437); Detroit, MI
November 12, 2024*; 7:00 pm, ESPN+		at Cleveland State	L 68–75	1–2	28 – Velasco	12 – Ellis	6 – Kohler	Wolstein Center (411); Cleveland, OH
November 16, 2024*; 12:00 pm, ESPN+		St. Bonaventure	W 92–41	2–2	22 – Velasco	12 – Ellis	5 – Tied	Stroh Center (1,513); Bowling Green, OH
November 19, 2024*; 7:00 pm, ESPN+		at No. 13 West Virginia	L 47–78	2–3	18 – Velasco	8 – Ellis	2 – Tied	WVU Coliseum (2,772); Morgantown, WV
November 24, 2024*; 1:00 pm, B1G+		at No. 12 Ohio State	L 53–96	2–4	24 – Velasco	7 – Kohler	3 – Velasco	Value City Arena (6,660); Columbus, OH
November 29, 2024*; 1:15 pm, BallerTV		vs. Stetson; Daytona Beach Classic	W 79–43	3–4	20 – Tied	8 – Porter	10 – Velasco	Ocean Center (125); Daytona Beach, FL
November 30, 2024*; 1:15 pm, BallerTV		vs. Arkansas; Daytona Beach Classic	W 79–78	4–4	25 – Kohler	9 – Porter	9 – Velasco	Ocean Center (105); Daytona Beach, FL
December 7, 2024*; 7:00 pm, ESPN+		Xavier	W 78–59	5–4	19 – Velasco	8 – Tied	6 – Velasco	Stroh Center (1,778); Bowling Green, OH
December 18, 2024*; 7:00 pm, ESPN+		Marquette	W 64–62	6–4	14 – Velasco	8 – McGuff	6 – Kohler	Stroh Center (1,892); Bowling Green, OH
December 21, 2024*; 12:00 pm, ESPN+		at Duquesne	L 59–67	6–5	19 – Porter	5 – Tied	4 – Kohler	UPMC Cooper Fieldhouse (805); Pittsburgh, PA
MAC regular season
January 1, 2025; 1:00 pm, ESPN+		at Kent State	L 71–81	6–6 (0–1)	17 – Fleming	9 – McGuff	8 – Velasco	MAC Center (1,078); Kent, OH
January 4, 2025; 7:00 pm, ESPN+		Eastern Michigan	W 90–76	7–6 (1–1)	22 – Porter	6 – McGuff	5 – Kohler	Stroh Center (2,108); Bowling Green, OH
January 8, 2025; 7:00 pm, ESPN+		Buffalo	L 60–70	7–7 (1–2)	22 – Velasco	11 – Porter	4 – Tied	Stroh Center (1,690); Bowling Green, OH
January 11, 2025; 1:00 pm, ESPN+		at Miami (OH)	L 63–78	7–8 (1–3)	23 – Fleming	7 – Porter	6 – Fleming	Millett Hall (422); Oxford, OH
January 15, 2025; 7:00 pm, ESPN+		at Ohio	W 74–53	8–8 (2–3)	19 – Fleming	8 – Tied	8 – Kohler	Convocation Center (786); Athens, OH
January 18, 2025; 7:00 pm, ESPN+		Northern Illinois	W 74–60	9–8 (3–3)	15 – Tied	5 – Tied	6 – Velasco	Stroh Center (1,712); Bowling Green, OH
January 22, 2025; 7:00 pm, ESPN+		Western Michigan	L 60–63	9–9 (3–4)	17 – Porter	6 – Fearne	5 – Kohler	Stroh Center (1,535); Bowling Green, OH
January 25, 2025; 2:00 pm, ESPN+		at Toledo	L 68–80	9–10 (3–5)	23 – Fleming	4 – Tied	3 – Tied	Savage Arena (6,527); Toledo, OH
January 29, 2025; 7:00 pm, ESPN+		Akron	W 82–69	10–10 (4–5)	28 – Kohler	7 – Kohler	7 – Kohler	Stroh Center (1,611); Bowling Green, OH
February 1, 2025; 1:00 pm, ESPN+		at Central Michigan	W 76–69	11–10 (5–5)	17 – Kohler	5 – Tied	5 – Donahue	McGuirk Arena (1,232); Mount Pleasant, MI
February 5, 2025; 6:30 pm, ESPN+		at Ball State	L 51–71	11–11 (5–6)	15 – Kohler	6 – Porter	3 – Tied	Worthen Arena (2,102); Muncie, IN
February 8, 2025*; 3:00 pm, ESPN+		at Arkansas State; MAC–SBC Challenge	W 75–73	12–11	19 – Donahue	11 – Porter	8 – Velasco	First National Bank Arena (815); Jonesboro, AR
February 15, 2025; 2:00 pm, ESPN+		Central Michigan	W 70–55	13–11 (6–6)	18 – Kohler	8 – Fleming	5 – Tied	Stroh Center (2,225); Bowling Green, OH
February 19, 2025; 7:00 pm, ESPN+		at Western Michigan	W 70–63	14–11 (7–6)	15 – Velasco	7 – Fleming	5 – Tied	University Arena (734); Kalamazoo, MI
February 22, 2025; 7:00 pm, ESPN+		Toledo	W 81–72	15–11 (8–6)	30 – Velasco	5 – Porter	6 – Kohler	Stroh Center (3,687); Bowling Green, OH
February 26, 2025; 7:00 pm, ESPN+		Ohio	W 91–61	16–11 (9–6)	22 – Tied	7 – Tied	11 – Velasco	Stroh Center (1,840); Bowling Green, OH
March 1, 2025; 2:00 pm, ESPN+		at Northern Illinois	L 77-84 ^{OT}	16–12 (9–7)	18 – Donahue	9 – Porter	5 – Velasco	Convocation Center; DeKalb, IL
March 5, 2025; 7:00 pm, ESPN+		Kent State						Stroh Center; Bowling Green, OH
March 8, 2025; 2:00 pm, ESPN+		at Eastern Michigan						George Gervin GameAbove Center; Ypsilanti, MI
MAC tournament
March 12–15, 2025; ESPN+/CBSSN		vs.						Rocket Arena; Cleveland, OH
*Non-conference game. ^{#}Rankings from AP poll. (#) Tournament seedings in parentheses. All times are in Eastern.
