= 2024–25 Northern Illinois Huskies women's basketball team =

American college basketball season

2024–25 Northern Illinois Huskies women's basketball
- Conference: Mid-American Conference
- Record: 13–15 (6–10 MAC)
- Head coach: Lisa Carlsen (10th season)
- Associate head coach: Adam Tandez
- Assistant coaches: Imani Gordon; Jenna Bolstad; Jasmine Hackett
- Home arena: Convocation Center

2024–25 Mid-American Conference women's basketball standings
| | Conf. | | | | Overall |
| Team | W | | L | PCT | W | | L | PCT |
|---|---|---|---|---|---|---|---|---|
| Ball State † | 16 | – | 2 | .889 | 27 | – | 8 | .771 |
| Toledo | 13 | – | 5 | .722 | 24 | – | 9 | .727 |
| Buffalo | 13 | – | 5 | .722 | 30 | – | 7 | .811 |
| Kent State | 12 | – | 6 | .667 | 21 | – | 12 | .636 |
| Miami (OH) | 11 | – | 7 | .611 | 19 | – | 12 | .613 |
| Bowling Green | 11 | – | 7 | .611 | 18 | – | 13 | .581 |
| Central Michigan | 9 | – | 9 | .500 | 14 | – | 17 | .452 |
| Western Michigan | 8 | – | 10 | .444 | 12 | – | 18 | .400 |
| Northern Illinois | 6 | – | 12 | .333 | 13 | – | 17 | .433 |
| Akron | 4 | – | 14 | .222 | 10 | – | 21 | .323 |
| Ohio | 4 | – | 14 | .222 | 6 | – | 23 | .207 |
| Eastern Michigan | 1 | – | 17 | .056 | 2 | – | 27 | .069 |
† 2025 MAC tournament winner

The 2024–25 Northern Illinois Huskies women's basketball team represented Northern Illinois University during the 2024–25 NCAA Division I women's basketball season. The Huskies, led by tenth-year head coach Lisa Carlsen, played their home games at the Convocation Center in DeKalb, Illinois as members of the Mid-American Conference.

== Previous season ==
The Huskies finished the 2023–24 season 15–16, 8–10 in MAC play, to finish in a tie for sixth place. They were defeated by eventual tournament champions Kent State in the quarterfinals of the MAC tournament.

== Preseason ==
On October 22, 2024, the MAC released the preseason coaches poll. Northern Illinois was picked to finish tied for sixth in the MAC regular season.

=== Preseason rankings ===
MAC preseason poll
| Predicted finish | Team | Votes (1st place) |
|---|---|---|
| 1 | Ball State | 120 (10) |
| 2 | Kent State | 104 (2) |
| 3 | Buffalo | 98 |
| 4 | Bowling Green | 96 |
| 5 | Toledo | 82 |
| T-6 | Northern Illinois | 64 |
| T-6 | Ohio | 64 |
| 8 | Miami (OH) | 44 |
| 9 | Akron | 43 |
| 10 | Western Michigan | 34 |
| 11 | Eastern Michigan | 23 |
| 12 | Central Michigan | 20 |

MAC tournament champions: Ball State (8), Bowling Green (1), Buffalo (1), Kent State (1), Toledo (1)

=== Preseason All-MAC ===
Preseason All-MAC teams
| Team | Player | Year |
|---|---|---|
| 2nd | Brooke Stonebraker | Graduate Student |

== Roster ==
2024–25 Northern Illinois Huskies women's basketball team
Players
Coaches

| Pos. | # | Name | Height | Year | Previous school | Hometown |
|---|---|---|---|---|---|---|
| G | 2 | Sidney McCrea | 5 ft 10 in (1.78 m) | RS Sr | Prairie High School | Cedar Rapids, Iowa |
| G | 3 | Julia Sollberger | 5 ft 8 in (1.73 m) | Fr | Dunlap High School | Peoria, Illinois |
| G | 4 | Makenzie Brass | 5 ft 9 in (1.75 m) | Fr | Minooka High School | Minooka, Illinois |
| G | 7 | Maria Serracanta | 6 ft 0 in (1.83 m) | Jr | Mercer | Sabadell, Spain |
| G | 10 | Chelby Koker | 5 ft 6 in (1.68 m) | GS | Shoreland Lutheran High School | Racine, Wisconsin |
| F | 11 | Kiylynn McNeal | 6 ft 1 in (1.85 m) | Jr | Western Oregon | Beaverton, Oregon |
| G | 12 | Shannon Blacher | 5 ft 10 in (1.78 m) | So | Montini Catholic High School | Burr Ridge, Illinois |
| G | 20 | Lexi Carlsen | 5 ft 8 in (1.73 m) | Fr | Sycamore High School | Sycamore, Illinois |
| F | 21 | Marta Hermoso | 6 ft 2 in (1.88 m) | Jr | McNeese | Seville, Spain |
| G | 22 | Alecia Doyle | 5 ft 8 in (1.73 m) | Jr | Southeast Missouri State | Carterville, Illinois |
| F | 23 | Reagan Barkema | 5 ft 11 in (1.8 m) | Jr | Bradley | Story City, Iowa |
| F | 24 | Maddy Fay | 6 ft 1 in (1.85 m) | So | Fremd High School | Palatine, Illinois |
| G | 32 | Laura Nickel | 6 ft 0 in (1.83 m) | Sr | Marshall High School | Marshall, Wisconsin |
| F | 34 | Brooke Stonebraker | 6 ft 3 in (1.91 m) | GS | Versailles High School | Versailles, Ohio |
| F | 41 | Brooke Blumenfeld | 6 ft 0 in (1.83 m) | RS So | Glenbrook North High School | Northbrook, Illinois |

Head coach

- Lisa Carlsen (Northwest Missouri State)

Assistant coach(es)

- Adam Tandez (Marquette)
- Imani Gordon (Cleveland State)
- Jenna Bolstad (Black Hills State)
- Jasmine Hackett (Sioux Falls)

Legend

- (C) Team captain
- (S) Suspended
- (I) Ineligible
- (W) Walk-on
- Injured
- Current redshirt

Roster
Last update: March 2, 2025

== Schedule and results ==
| Date time, TV | Rank^{#} | Opponent^{#} | Result | Record | High points | High rebounds | High assists | Site (attendance) city, state |
Exhibition
| October 27, 2024*; 1:00 pm | | Benedictine | W 72–48 | – | 12 – Stonebraker | 7 – McCrea | 7 – Nickel | Convocation Center (435); DeKalb, IL |
Non-conference regular season
| November 4, 2024*; 11:00 am, ESPN+ | | Louisiana; MAC–SBC Challenge | W 57–55 | 1–0 | 18 – Koker | 9 – Koker | 9 – Koker | Convocation Center; DeKalb, IL |
| November 6, 2024*; 6:30 pm, B1G+ | | at Iowa | L 73–91 | 1–1 | 15 – Stonebraker | 5 – Blacher | 5 – McCrea | Carver–Hawkeye Arena (14,998); Iowa City, IA |
| November 10, 2024*; 1:00 pm, ESPN+ | | St. Thomas | L 68–75 | 1–2 | 18 – Blumenfeld | 7 – Tied | 3 – Serracanta | Convocation Center (1,005); DeKalb, IL |
| November 20, 2024*; 6:00 pm, NEC Front Row | | at Chicago State | W 77–68 | 2–2 | 21 – Doyle | 8 – Tied | 4 – Tied | Jones Convocation Center (143); Chicago, IL |
| November 24, 2024*; 12:00 pm, ESPN+ | | at Milwaukee | W 67–60 | 3–2 | 17 – Tied | 9 – Stonebraker | 5 – Koker | Klotsche Center (573); Milwaukee, WI |
| November 27, 2024*; 6:00 pm, ESPN+ | | UIC | L 66–69 | 3–3 | 16 – Koker | 7 – Nickel | 4 – Koker | Convocation Center (805); DeKalb, IL |
| December 7, 2024*; 2:00 pm, SECN+ | | at Missouri | L 55–94 | 3–4 | 14 – Blumenfeld | 5 – Stonebraker | 2 – Tied | Mizzou Arena; Columbia, MO |
| December 15, 2024*; 1:00 pm | | vs. Indiana State; Eastern Kentucky MTE | W 82–78 | 4–4 | 20 – Stonebraker | 11 – Stonebraker | 5 – Carlsen | Clive M. Beck Center (101); Lexington, KY |
| December 17, 2024*; 5:00 pm, ESPN+ | | at Eastern Kentucky; Eastern Kentucky MTE | L 64–76 | 4–5 | 18 – Stonebraker | 9 – Tied | 5 – Koker | Clive M. Beck Center (149); Lexington, KY |
| December 20, 2024*; 1:00 pm, ESPN+ | | Idaho State | W 51–50 ^{OT} | 5–5 | 14 – Stonebraker | 13 – Stonebraker | 7 – Koker | Convocation Center (705); DeKalb, IL |
| December 28, 2024*; 1:00 pm, ESPN+ | | Viterbo | W 92–44 | 6–5 | 20 – Doyle | 6 – Tied | 4 – Tied | Convocation Center (802); DeKalb, IL |
MAC regular season
| January 1, 2025; 3:00 pm, ESPN+ | | at Toledo | W 59–58 | 7–5 (1–0) | 16 – Koker | 7 – Stonebraker | 5 – Koker | Savage Arena (3,830); Toledo, OH |
| January 4, 2025; 1:00 pm, ESPN+ | | Ohio | L 55–71 | 7–6 (1–1) | 17 – Carlsen | 8 – Tied | 4 – Koker | Convocation Center (775); DeKalb, IL |
| January 8, 2025; 5:00 pm, ESPN+ | | at Akron | L 71–73 | 7–7 (1–2) | 16 – Blumenfeld | 6 – Doyle | 5 – Koker | James A. Rhodes Arena (426); Akron, OH |
| January 11, 2025; 1:00 pm, ESPN+ | | Western Michigan | L 57–61 | 7–8 (1–3) | 14 – Koker | 9 – Carlsen | 5 – Koker | Convocation Center (940); DeKalb, IL |
| January 15, 2025; 6:00 pm, ESPN+ | | Miami (OH) | L 52–73 | 7–9 (1–4) | 14 – Koker | 9 – Doyle | 4 – Koker | Convocation Center (770); DeKalb, IL |
| January 18, 2025; 6:00 pm, ESPN+ | | at Bowling Green | L 60–74 | 7–10 (1–5) | 16 – Koker | 9 – Stonebraker | 5 – Koker | Stroh Center (1,712); Bowling Green, OH |
| January 22, 2025; 5:30 pm, ESPN+ | | at Eastern Michigan | W 78–70 | 8–10 (2–5) | 23 – Koker | 9 – Koker | 6 – Koker | George Gervin GameAbove Center (1,068); Ypsilanti, MI |
| January 25, 2025; 1:00 pm, ESPN+ | | Ball State | L 62–81 | 8–11 (2–6) | 17 – Stonebraker | 8 – Stonebraker | 5 – Koker | Convocation Center; DeKalb, IL |
| January 29, 2025; 6:00 pm, ESPN+ | | Central Michigan | W 80–75 | 9–11 (3–6) | 19 – Koker | 4 – Tied | 8 – Koker | Convocation Center (707); DeKalb, IL |
| February 1, 2025; 1:00 pm, ESPN+ | | at Buffalo | L 58–84 | 9–12 (3–7) | 15 – Koker | 7 – Carlsen | 4 – Koker | Alumni Arena (2,055); Amherst, NY |
| February 5, 2025; 6:00 pm, ESPN+ | | Kent State | W 73–69 | 10–12 (4–7) | 23 – Doyle | 5 – Tied | 4 – Carlsen | Convocation Center (1,401); DeKalb, IL |
| February 8, 2025*; 1:00 pm, ESPN+ | | at Appalachian State; MAC–SBC Challenge | W 75–62 | 11–12 | 22 – Doyle | 7 – Koker | 8 – Koker | Holmes Center (531); Boone, NC |
| February 15, 2025; 11:00 am, ESPN+ | | at Western Michigan | W 60–51 | 12–12 (5–7) | 20 – Koker | 7 – Tied | 5 – Koker | University Arena (791); Kalamazoo, MI |
| February 19, 2025; 6:00 pm, ESPN+ | | at Ohio | L 70–74 | 12–13 (5–8) | 21 – Doyle | 10 – Doyle | 5 – Tied | Convocation Center (670); Athens, OH |
| February 22, 2025; 1:00 pm, ESPN+ | | Eastern Michigan | L 72–76 | 12–14 (5–9) | 19 – Doyle | 9 – Doyle | 4 – Carlsen | Convocation Center; DeKalb, IL |
| February 26, 2025; 6:00 pm, ESPN+ | | at Kent State | L 58–76 | 12–15 (5–10) | 21 – Doyle | 6 – Stonebraker | 4 – Koker | MAC Center (1,082); Kent, OH |
| March 1, 2025; 1:00 pm, ESPN+ | | Bowling Green | W 84–77 ^{2OT} | 13–15 (6–10) | 28 – Koker | 7 – McCrea | 4 – Koker | Convocation Center; DeKalb, IL |
| March 5, 2025; 6:00 pm, ESPN+ | | Toledo | L 70–79 | 13–16 (6–11) | 24 – Koker | 6 – Carlsen | 4 – Koker | Convocation Center (480); DeKalb, IL |
| March 8, 2025; 12:00 pm, ESPN+ | | at Miami (OH) | | | | | | Millett Hall; Oxford, OH |
*Non-conference game. ^{#}Rankings from AP poll. (#) Tournament seedings in parentheses. All times are in Central.
