= 2024–25 Ohio Bobcats women's basketball team =

Intercollegiate basketball season

2024–25 Ohio Bobcats women's basketball
- Conference: Mid-American Conference
- Record: 6–23 (4–14 MAC)
- Head coach: Bob Boldon (12th season)
- Assistant coaches: Tavares Jackson; Chelsea Welch; Kaylee Gregory Bambule; Abby Garnett
- Home arena: Convocation Center

2024–25 Mid-American Conference women's basketball standings
	Conf.				Overall
Team	W		L	PCT	W		L	PCT
Ball State †	16	–	2	.889	27	–	8	.771
Toledo	13	–	5	.722	24	–	9	.727
Buffalo	13	–	5	.722	30	–	7	.811
Kent State	12	–	6	.667	21	–	12	.636
Miami (OH)	11	–	7	.611	19	–	12	.613
Bowling Green	11	–	7	.611	18	–	13	.581
Central Michigan	9	–	9	.500	14	–	17	.452
Western Michigan	8	–	10	.444	12	–	18	.400
Northern Illinois	6	–	12	.333	13	–	17	.433
Akron	4	–	14	.222	10	–	21	.323
Ohio	4	–	14	.222	6	–	23	.207
Eastern Michigan	1	–	17	.056	2	–	27	.069
† 2025 MAC tournament winner

The 2024–25 Ohio Bobcats women's basketball team represented Ohio University during the 2024–25 NCAA Division I women's basketball season. The Bobcats, led by twelfth-year head coach Bob Boldon, played their home games at the Convocation Center in Athens, Ohio as a member of the Mid-American Conference.

They finished 6–23 and 4–14 in MAC play, to finish tied for eleventh in the MAC. They failed to qualify for the MAC tournament.

== Previous season ==
They finished the regular season 11–18, 8–10 in MAC play, to finish tied for 6th place. They lost to Ball State in the first round of the MAC tournament.

== Offseason ==
=== Coaching staff changes ===
==== Coaching departures ====
2024–25 coaching departures
Name	Alma mater	Previous position	New position
Steph Haas	Florida Gulf Coast	Assistant coach	

==== Coaching additions ====
2024–25 coaching additions
Name	Alma mater	Previous position	New position
Kaylee Gregory Bambule	Ohio University	Video coordinator	Assistant coach
Abby Garnett	Ohio University	Player (2023)	Assistant coach

=== Departures ===
Departures
Name	Number	Pos.	Height	Year	Hometown	Reason
Aylasia Fantroy	2	G	5'11"	Freshman	Palestine, TX	Transferred to Texas Southern
Bengisu Alper	33	G	5'11"	Senior	Istanbul, Turkey	Graduated, Exhausted Eligibility
Madi Mace	3	G	5'11"	RS-Junior	Parkersburg, WV	Graduated
Peyton Guice	11	G	5'11"	Senior	Westerville, OH	Graduated
Kailah Johnson	10	G	5'8"	Senior	Orem, UT	Graduated, Exhausted Eligibility

=== Incoming transfers ===
Incoming transfers
Name	Number	Pos.	Height	Year	Hometown	Reason
Anyssa Jones	3	G	5'10"	Grad. Student	Westerville, OH	Transferred from Dayton. Will have one year of eligibility remaining.
Aliah McWhorter	4	G	6'1"	Senior	Istanbul, Turkey	Transferred from Wake Forest. Will have two years of eligibility remaining.
Kiersten Cashell	31	F	5'11"	Sophomore	Hilliard, Ohio	Transferred from Capital. Will have three years of eligibility remaining.

=== 2024 recruiting class ===
Recruiting class
Name	Number	Pos.	Height	High school	Hometown
Gigi Bower	20	G	5'9"	Olentangy Liberty	Powell, OH
Danni Scully	23	F	6'1"	Nazareth Academy	Park Ridge, IL
Olivia Rinard	36	G	5'9"	Williamstown	Williamstown, WV

== Preseason ==
On October 22, 2024 the MAC released the preseason coaches poll. Ohio was picked to finish tied for sixth in the MAC regular season. Ohio received no to win the MAC Tournament.

=== Preseason rankings ===
MAC preseason poll
Predicted finish	Team	Votes (1st place)
1	Ball State	120 (10)
2	Kent State	104 (2)
3	Buffalo	96
4	Bowling Green	96
5	Toledo	82
T6	Northern Illinois	64
T6	Ohio	64
8	Miami	44
9	Akron	43
10	Western Michigan	34
11	Eastern Michigan	23
12	Central Michigan	20

MAC tournament champion:): Ball State (8), Bowling Green (1), Buffalo (1), Kent State (1), Toledo (1)

=== Preseason All-MAC ===
Preseason All-MAC teams
Team	Player	Position	Year
2nd	Jaya McClure	G	Jr.

== Roster ==
2024–25 Ohio Bobcats women's basketball team
Players
Coaches

Pos.	#	Name	Height	Year	Previous school	Hometown
G	14	Kate Dennis	6 ft 1 in (1.85 m)	Sr	Guilford	Rockford, IL
G	0	Jaya McClure	5 ft 6 in (1.68 m)	Jr	Christian Academy	Louisville, KY
F	24	Aja Austin	6 ft 1 in (1.85 m)	Sr		Westerville, OH
F	41	Cassidy Lafler	5 ft 11 in (1.8 m)	Jr	Dublin Coffman	Dublin, OH
G	12	Monica Williams	5 ft 9 in (1.75 m)	So	Lawrence North	Indianapolis, IN
G	21	Bailey Tabeling	5 ft 10 in (1.78 m)	So	Trinity Lutheran	Seymour, IN
G	22	Asiah Baxter	5 ft 11 in (1.8 m)	So	Warren Central	Indianapolis, IN
F	34	Emma Barnett	6 ft 1 in (1.85 m)	So	Mercy Academy	Mount Washington, KY
G	5	Kennedi Watkins	5 ft 10 in (1.78 m)	Sr	Marquette	Ballwin, MO
G	3	Anyssa Jones	5 ft 10 in (1.78 m)	GS	Westerville South	Westerville, OH
G	4	Aliah McWhorter	6 ft 1 in (1.85 m)	GS	Sycamore	Cincinnati, OH
G	20	Gigi Bower	5 ft 9 in (1.75 m)	Fr	Olentangy	Powell, OH
F	23	Danni Scully	6 ft 1 in (1.85 m)	Fr	Nazareth Academy	Park Ridge, IL
G	30	Madison Lim	5 ft 10 in (1.78 m)	Fr	Mechanicsburg	Marysville, OH
F	31	Kiersten Cashell	5 ft 11 in (1.8 m)	So	Capital	Hilliard, OH
G	36	Olivia Rinard	5 ft 5 in (1.65 m)	Fr	Williamstown	Williamstown, WV

Head coach

- Bob Boldon (Walsh)

Assistant coach(es)

- Tavares Jackson (Minnesota)
- Chelsea Welch (Wright State)
- Kaylee Gregory Bambule (Ohio)
- Abby Garnett (Ohio)

Legend

- (C) Team captain
- (S) Suspended
- (I) Ineligible
- (W) Walk-on
- Injured
- Current redshirt

Roster
Last update: October 11, 2024

=== Support staff ===
2024–25 Ohio Bobcats support staff
- Ebony Pegues – Director of Basketball Operations
- Ben Gilkey – Assistant Strength and Conditioning Coach
- Becca Gaddy – Director of Athletics Communications (Volleyball, Women's Basketball, Cross Country/Track & Field, Baseball)
- Morgan Hall – Staff Athletic Trainer
- Jessica Arquette – Ohio Athletics Sports Dietitian
- Kaitlyn Michener – Nutritionist
- Hannah Rastatter – Nutritionist

== Schedule ==
Date time, TV	Rank^{#}	Opponent^{#}	Result	Record	High points	High rebounds	High assists	Site (attendance) city, state
Non-conference regular season
November 4, 2024*; 7:00 p.m., ESPN+		Georgia Southern; MAC-SBC Challenge	L 70–82	0–1	26 – Watkins	8 – Tabeling	4 – Williams	Convocation Center (679); Athens, OH
November 10, 2024*; 1:00 p.m., ESPN+		Bellarmine	L 50–82	0–2	17 – Tabeling	9 – Williams	3 – McWorter	Convocation Center (287); Athens, OH
November 16, 2024*; 12:00 p.m., ESPN+		George Washington	W 52–40	1–2	15 – Dennis	9 – Tabeling	4 – Williams	Convocation Center (564); Athens, OH
November 20, 2024*; 7:00 p.m., ESPN+		No. 12 Ohio State	L 42–106	1–3	9 – Tied	6 – Tabeling	2 – McWhorter	Convocation Center (4,820); Athens, OH
November 24, 2024*; 2:00 p.m., ESPN+		at Wright State	L 57–68	1–4	20 – Watkins	10 – Watkins	4 – Tabeling	Nutter Center (1,216); Fairborn, OH
December 3, 2024*; 11:00 a.m, ESPN+		Ohio Christian	W 97–37	2–4	21 – Bower	7 – Tied	4 – Tied	Convocation Center (2,250); Athens, OH
December 8, 2024*; 1:00 p.m., ESPN+		Butler	L 60–69	2–5	23 – Watkins	6 – Watkins	4 – Tabeling	Convocation Center (702); Athens, OH
December 15, 2024*; 3:00 p.m., ESPN+		at Saint Louis	L 52–96	2–6	15 – Tabeling	9 – Watkins	2 – Watkins	Chaifetz Arena (625); St. Louis, MO
December 22, 2024*; 1:00 p.m., ESPN+		at UIC	L 45–91	2–7	9 – McWhorter	5 – Baxter	3 – Tabeling	Credit Union 1 Arena (535); Chicago, IL
December 28, 2024*; 4:00 p.m., SEC+		at Georgia	L 50–83	2–8	15 – Watkins	5 – Baxter	3 – Tied	Stegeman Coliseum (2,525); Athens, GA
MAC regular season
January 1, 2025; 4:00 p.m., ESPN+		Akron	L 61–74	2–9 (0–1)	19 – Tabeling	5 – Watkins	6 – Tabeling	Convocation Center (558); Athens, OH
January 4, 2025; 2:00 p.m., ESPN+		at Northern Illinois	W 71–55	3–9 (1–1)	28 – Tabeling	8 – Tabeling	4 – McWhorter	Convocation Center (775); DeKalb, IL
January 8, 2025; 7:00 p.m., TBA		at Western Michigan	L 49–66	3–10 (1–2)	24 – Watkins	5 – Watkins	3 – Tied	University Arena (647); Kalamazoo, MI
January 11, 2025; 3:30 p.m., ESPN+		Kent State	L 64–79	3–11 (1–3)	21 – Watkins	8 – Watkins	4 – Tied	Convocation Center (4011); Athens, OH
January 15, 2025; 7:00 p.m., ESPN+		Bowling Green	L 53–74	3–12 (1–4)	26 – Tabeling	3 – Tied	3 – Watkins	Convocation Center (786); Athens, OH
January 18, 2025; 2:00 p.m., ESPN+		at Toledo	L 65–80	3–13 (1–5)	25 – Watkins	5 – Baxter	3 – Tabeling	Savage Arena (4337); Toledo, OH
January 22, 2025; 6:00 p.m., ESPN+		at Buffalo	L 55–72	3–14 (1–6)	15 – Watkins	8 – Tabeling	4 – Tied	Alumni Arena (1047); Amherst, NY
January 25, 2025; 1:00 p.m., ESPN+		Eastern Michigan	W 69–59	4–14 (2–6)	21 – Tabeling	4 – Watkins	3 – Tabeling	Convocation Center (630); Athens, OH
January 29, 2025; 7:00 p.m., ESPN+		Ball State	L 61–83	4–15 (2–7)	25 – Jones	9 – Jones	4 – McWhorter	Convocation Center (980); Athens, OH
February 1, 2025; 1:00 p.m., ESPN+		at Miami (OH)	L 34–72	4–16 (2–8)	10 – Jones	6 – Jones	2 – Baxter	Millett Hall (2011); Oxford, OH
February 5, 2025; 6:30 p.m., ESPN+		at Central Michigan	L 48–75	4–17 (2–9)	17 – Watkins	7 – Jones	3 – Jones	McGuirk Arena (1061); Mount Pleasant, MI
February 8, 2025*; 3:00 p.m., ESPN+		at Southern Miss; MAC-SBC Challenge	L 46–58	4–18	14 – Jones	6 – Tied	2 – Tied	Reed Green Coliseum (1160); Hattiesburg, Mississippi
February 15, 2025; 1:00 p.m., ESPN+		Buffalo	L 67–79	4–19 (2–10)	19 – Tabeling	6 – McWhorter	3 – Tied	Convocation Center (886); Athens, OH
February 19, 2025; 7:00 p.m., ESPN+		Northern Illinois	W 70–62	5–19 (3–10)	23 – Watkins	6 – Watkins	2 – Tied	Convocation Center (670); Athens, OH
February 22, 2025; 1:00 p.m., ESPN+		at Akron	W 74–70	6–19 (4–10)	18 – McWhorter	6 – Jones	5 – Tabeling	James A. Rhodes Arena (336); Akron, OH
February 26, 2025; 7:00 p.m., ESPN+		at Bowling Green	L 61–91	6–20 (4–11)	16 – Watkins	5 – Dennis	3 – Bower	Stroh Center (1840); Bowling Green, OH
March 1, 2025; 3:30 p.m., ESPN+		Miami (OH)	L 53–62	6–21 (4–12)	17 – Tabeling	8 – Sculli	2 – Bower	Convocation Center (7891); Athens, OH
March 5, 2025; 7:00 p.m., ESPN+		Western Michigan	L 56–75	6–22 (4–13)	15 – Watkins	5 – Jones	2 – Tied	Convocation Center (765); Athens, OH
March 8, 2025; 1:00 p.m., ESPN+		at Ball State	L 57–82	6–23 (4–14)	25 – Watkins	4 – Tied	2 – Tied	Worthen Arena (1810); Muncie, IN
*Non-conference game. ^{#}Rankings from AP Poll. (#) Tournament seedings in parentheses. All times are in Eastern Time.

== Awards and honors ==
=== All-MAC Awards ===
Postseason All-MAC teams
Team	Player	Position	Year
All-MAC 3rd Team	Kennedi Watkins	G	Sr.
