= 2024–25 Miami RedHawks women's basketball team =

American college basketball season

2024–25 Miami RedHawks women's basketball

WNIT, second round
- Conference: Mid-American Conference
- Record: 19–12 (11–7 MAC)
- Head coach: Glenn Box (2nd season)
- Associate head coach: Ben Wierzba
- Assistant coaches: Megan Belke; JR Shumate; Kym Royster
- Home arena: Millett Hall

2024–25 Mid-American Conference women's basketball standings
	Conf.				Overall
Team	W		L	PCT	W		L	PCT
Ball State †	16	–	2	.889	27	–	8	.771
Toledo	13	–	5	.722	24	–	9	.727
Buffalo	13	–	5	.722	30	–	7	.811
Kent State	12	–	6	.667	21	–	12	.636
Miami (OH)	11	–	7	.611	19	–	12	.613
Bowling Green	11	–	7	.611	18	–	13	.581
Central Michigan	9	–	9	.500	14	–	17	.452
Western Michigan	8	–	10	.444	12	–	18	.400
Northern Illinois	6	–	12	.333	13	–	17	.433
Akron	4	–	14	.222	10	–	21	.323
Ohio	4	–	14	.222	6	–	23	.207
Eastern Michigan	1	–	17	.056	2	–	27	.069
† 2025 MAC tournament winner

The 2024–25 Miami RedHawks women's basketball team represented Miami University during the 2024–25 NCAA Division I women's basketball season. The RedHawks, led by second-year head coach Glenn Box, played their home games at Millett Hall in Oxford, Ohio as members of the Mid-American Conference (MAC).

The RedHawks finished the season 19–12, 11–7 in MAC play, to finish in a tie for fifth place.

== Previous season ==
The RedHawks finished the 2023–24 season 8–17, 5–9 in MAC play, to finish in a tie for ninth place. They failed to qualify for the MAC tournament, as only the top eight teams qualify.

== Preseason ==
On October 22, 2024, the MAC released the preseason coaches poll. Miami was picked to finish eighth in the MAC regular season.

=== Preseason rankings ===
MAC preseason poll
Predicted finish	Team	Votes (1st place)
1	Ball State	120 (10)
2	Kent State	104 (2)
3	Buffalo	98
4	Bowling Green	96
5	Toledo	82
T–6	Northern Illinois	64
T–6	Ohio	64
8	Miami (OH)	44
9	Akron	43
10	Western Michigan	34
11	Eastern Michigan	23
12	Central Michigan	20

MAC tournament champions: Ball State (8), Bowling Green (1), Buffalo (1), Kent State (1), Toledo (1)

=== Preseason All-MAC ===
No RedHawks were named to the first or second Preseason All-MAC teams.

== Roster ==
2024–25 Miami RedHawks women's basketball team
Players
Coaches

Pos.	#	Name	Height	Year	Previous school	Hometown
G	0	Clare Chambers	5 ft 10 in (1.78 m)	Sr	Magnificat High School	Westlake, OH
G	3	Emily Bratton	5 ft 7 in (1.7 m)	Fr	Bloom-Carroll High School	Carroll, OH
G	4	Lakresha Edwards	6 ft 0 in (1.83 m)	So	Fort Erie International Academy	Chilliwack, BC
G	10	Maya Chandler	5 ft 7 in (1.7 m)	GS	SMU	Martinsville, IN
G	11	Enjulina Gonzalez	5 ft 9 in (1.75 m)	So	Mercer	Miami, FL
G	12	Ziul Gonzalez	5 ft 7 in (1.7 m)	Fr	Miami Christian School	Miami, FL
G	13	Tamar Singer	5 ft 4 in (1.63 m)	Fr	Ironi He High School	Haifa, Israel
F	15	Amber Tretter	6 ft 1 in (1.85 m)	So	Forest Park High School	Ferdinand, IN
G	17	Núria Jurjo	5 ft 10 in (1.78 m)	So	Institut Montserrat Roig	Barcelona, Spain
F	21	Ilse de Vries	6 ft 3 in (1.91 m)	Fr	Calandlyceum	Groningen, Netherlands
G	22	Cori Lard	5 ft 9 in (1.75 m)	Sr	Barton Community College	Davenport, IA
F	32	Katey Richason	6 ft 1 in (1.85 m)	Sr	Zionsville Community High School	Zionsville, IN
G	35	Camille Jackson	5 ft 11 in (1.8 m)	Jr	Illinois	Chicago, IL

Head coach

- Glenn Box (Southeast Missouri State)

Assistant coach(es)

- Ben Wierzba (SIU Edwardsville)
- Megan Belke (Grand Valley State)
- JR Shumate (Otterbein)
- Kym Royster (Indiana)

Legend

- (C) Team captain
- (S) Suspended
- (I) Ineligible
- (W) Walk-on
- Injured
- Current redshirt

Roster
Last update: February 26, 2025

== Schedule and results ==
Date time, TV	Rank^{#}	Opponent^{#}	Result	Record	High points	High rebounds	High assists	Site (attendance) city, state
Non-conference regular season
November 4, 2024*; 7:00 p.m., ESPN+		Appalachian State; MAC–SBC Challenge	W 75–48	1–0	13 – Tretter	9 – Tretter	6 – Chandler	Millett Hall (442); Oxford, OH
November 10, 2024*; 1:00 p.m., FloHoops		at Xavier	L 66–71	1–1	16 – Tretter	11 – Tretter	5 – Singer	Cintas Center (428); Cincinnati, OH
November 14, 2024*; 5:00 p.m., ESPN+		Tiffin	W 84–53	2–1	14 – Bratton	6 – Edwards	3 – 3 tied	Millett Hall (415); Oxford, OH
November 17, 2024*; 1:00 p.m., ESPN+		Austin Peay	W 59–52	3–1	13 – Chandler	9 – Tretter	5 – Singer	Millett Hall (522); Oxford, OH
November 22, 2024*; 11:00 a.m., ESPN+		Hiram	W 97–41	4–1	27 – Jackson	9 – 2 tied	3 – Chambers	Millett Hall (505); Oxford, OH
December 1, 2024*; 3:00 p.m., ESPN+		at Western Kentucky	L 60–79	4–2	22 – E. Gonzalez	9 – Tretter	6 – Singer	E. A. Diddle Arena (705); Bowling Green, KY
December 5, 2024*; 7:00 p.m., ESPN+		at Dayton	W 60–43	5–2	27 – E. Gonzalez	9 – Richason	6 – Singer	UD Arena (1,565); Dayton, OH
December 17, 2024*; 7:00 p.m., ESPN+		Purdue	L 51–67	5–3	18 – E. Gonzalez	5 – E. Gonzalez	2 – 2 tied	Millett Hall (639); Oxford, OH
December 20, 2024*; 2:00 p.m., ESPN+		vs. George Washington; FIU Christmas Classic	W 74–49	6–3	19 – E. Gonzalez	10 – Tretter	4 – E. Gonzalez	Ocean Bank Convocation Center (485); Miami, FL
December 21, 2024*; 12:00 p.m., ESPN+		at FIU; FIU Christmas Classic	W 62–55	7–3	29 – E. Gonzalez	7 – Tretter	4 – 2 tied	Ocean Bank Convocation Center (538); Miami, FL
MAC regular season
January 1, 2025; 1:00 p.m., ESPN+		Ball State	L 55–68	7–4 (0–1)	15 – E. Gonzalez	6 – Tretter	4 – Singer	Millett Hall (537); Oxford, OH
January 4, 2025; 2:30 p.m., ESPN+		at Western Michigan	W 57–51	8–4 (1–1)	23 – E. Gonzalez	7 – E. Gonzalez	3 – Chandler	University Arena (1,075); Kalamazoo, MI
January 8, 2025; 6:30 p.m., ESPN+		at Central Michigan	L 46–47	8–5 (1–2)	11 – E. Gonzalez	13 – Tretter	2 – E. Gonzalez	McGuirk Arena (971); Mount Pleasant, MI
January 11, 2025; 1:00 p.m., ESPN+		Bowling Green	W 78–63	9–5 (2–2)	25 – Chandler	6 – Tretter	7 – Singer	Millett Hall (422); Oxford, OH
January 15, 2025; 7:00 p.m., ESPN+		at Northern Illinois	W 73–52	10–5 (3–2)	25 – E. Gonzalez	10 – Tretter	4 – Singer	Convocation Center (770); DeKalb, IL
January 18, 2025; 2:00 p.m., ESPN+		at Buffalo	L 51–59	10–6 (3–3)	16 – E. Gonzalez	8 – Tretter	4 – 2 tied	Alumni Arena (1,362); Amherst, NY
January 22, 2025; 7:00 p.m., ESPN+		Akron	W 76–54	11–6 (4–3)	15 – E. Gonzalez	7 – Tretter	5 – Singer	Millett Hall (209); Oxford, OH
January 25, 2025; 1:00 p.m., ESPN+		Kent State	L 63–77	11–7 (4–4)	18 – Chandler	11 – Tretter	2 – 2 tied	Millett Hall (364); Oxford, OH
January 29, 2025; 7:00 p.m., ESPN+		at Toledo	L 59–64	11–8 (4–5)	19 – E. Gonzalez	6 – Tretter	6 – Singer	Savage Arena (4,187); Toledo, OH
February 1, 2025; 1:00 p.m., ESPN+		Ohio	W 72–34	12–8 (5–5)	23 – E. Gonzalez	10 – Tretter	5 – Singer	Millett Hall (2,011); Oxford, OH
February 5, 2025; 7:00 p.m., ESPN+		Eastern Michigan	W 68–45	13–8 (6–5)	20 – E. Gonzalez	8 – Richason	5 – Lard	Millett Hall (384); Oxford, OH
February 8, 2025*; 3:00 p.m., ESPN+		at Louisiana; MAC–SBC Challenge	W 60–59 ^{OT}	14–8	17 – Singer	11 – Tretter	3 – 2 tied	Cajundome (707); Lafayette, LA
February 15, 2025; 1:00 p.m., ESPN+		at Kent State	W 64–62	15–8 (7–5)	18 – 2 tied	13 – Tretter	4 – E. Gonzalez	MAC Center (1,180); Kent, OH
February 19, 2025; 6:00 p.m., ESPN+		at Akron	W 70–58	16–8 (8–5)	17 – Chandler	11 – Tretter	5 – E. Gonzalez	James A. Rhodes Arena (171); Akron, OH
February 22, 2025; 1:00 p.m., ESPN+		Buffalo	L 54–68	16–9 (8–6)	17 – E. Gonzalez	20 – Tretter	4 – Singer	Millett Hall (1,318); Oxford, OH
February 26, 2025; 6:30 p.m., ESPN+		at Eastern Michigan	W 82–72 ^{OT}	17–9 (9–6)	20 – E. Gonzalez	17 – Tretter	6 – Singer	George Gervin GameAbove Center (1,113); Ypsilanti, MI
March 1, 2025; 3:30 p.m., ESPN+		at Ohio	W 62-53	18–9 (10–6)	14 – Chandler	8 – 2 tied	7 – Singer	Convocation Center (7,891); Athens, OH
March 5, 2025; 7:00 p.m., ESPN+		Central Michigan	L 66–69 ^{OT}	18–10 (10–7)	15 – Chandler	12 – Tretter	6 – Singer	Millett Hall (433); Oxford, OH
March 8, 2025; 1:00 p.m., ESPN+		Northern Illinois	W 89–79	19–10 (11–7)	26 – Chandler	8 – Tretter	5 – Singer	Millett Hall (1,243); Oxford, OH
MAC tournament
March 12, 2025; 1:30 p.m., ESPN+	(5)	vs. (4) Kent State; Quarterfinals	L 61–68	19–11	23 – Chandler	11 – Tretter	6 – Singer	Rocket Arena; Cleveland, OH
WNIT
March 23, 2025; 1:00 p.m., ESPN+		Duquesne; Second round	L 66–73	19–12	16 – Chandler	13 – Tretter	4 – Singer	Millett Hall (429); Oxford, OH
*Non-conference game. ^{#}Rankings from AP poll. (#) Tournament seedings in parentheses. All times are in Eastern.
