= 2024–25 Akron Zips women's basketball team =

American college basketball season

2024–25 Akron Zips women's basketball
- Conference: Mid-American Conference
- Record: 9–20 (3–13 MAC)
- Head coach: Ryan Gensler (2nd season)
- Assistant coaches: Jessica Jenkins; Sarah Jones; Erin Mills-Reid
- Home arena: James A. Rhodes Arena

2024–25 Mid-American Conference women's basketball standings
	Conf.				Overall
Team	W		L	PCT	W		L	PCT
Ball State †	16	–	2	.889	27	–	8	.771
Toledo	13	–	5	.722	24	–	9	.727
Buffalo	13	–	5	.722	30	–	7	.811
Kent State	12	–	6	.667	21	–	12	.636
Miami (OH)	11	–	7	.611	19	–	12	.613
Bowling Green	11	–	7	.611	18	–	13	.581
Central Michigan	9	–	9	.500	14	–	17	.452
Western Michigan	8	–	10	.444	12	–	18	.400
Northern Illinois	6	–	12	.333	13	–	17	.433
Akron	4	–	14	.222	10	–	21	.323
Ohio	4	–	14	.222	6	–	23	.207
Eastern Michigan	1	–	17	.056	2	–	27	.069
† 2025 MAC tournament winner

The 2024–25 Akron Zips women's basketball team represented the University of Akron during the 2024–25 NCAA Division I women's basketball season. The Zips, led by second-year head coach Ryan Gensler, played their home games at the James A. Rhodes Arena in Akron, Ohio as members of the Mid-American Conference.

== Previous season ==
The Zips finished the 2023–24 season 11–18, 6–12 in MAC play, to finish in a tie for ninth place. They failed to qualify for the MAC tournament, as only the top eight teams qualify.

== Preseason ==
On October 22, 2024, the MAC released the preseason coaches poll. Akron was picked to finish ninth in the MAC regular season.

=== Preseason rankings ===
MAC preseason poll
Predicted finish	Team	Votes (1st place)
1	Ball State	120 (10)
2	Kent State	104 (2)
3	Buffalo	98
4	Bowling Green	96
5	Toledo	82
T-6	Northern Illinois	64
T-6	Ohio	64
8	Miami (OH)	44
9	Akron	43
10	Western Michigan	34
11	Eastern Michigan	23
12	Central Michigan	20

MAC tournament champions: Ball State (8), Bowling Green (1), Buffalo (1), Kent State (1), Toledo (1)

=== Preseason All-MAC ===
No Zips were named to the first or second Preseason All-MAC teams.

== Roster ==
2024–25 Akron Zips women's basketball team
Players
Coaches

Pos.	#	Name	Height	Year	Previous school	Hometown
G	1	Kyara Bakker	5 ft 7 in (1.7 m)	Fr	Orange Lions Academy	Leiderdorp, Netherlands
G	2	Alexus Mobley	5 ft 7 in (1.7 m)	Sr	Danville Community College	Indianapolis, Indiana
F	3	Shelbee Brown	5 ft 11 in (1.8 m)	RS Sr	Memphis	Memphis, Tennessee
G	4	Kam'Ren Rhodes	5 ft 6 in (1.68 m)	Jr	Illinois	Chandler, Arizona
G	5	Emily Hall	5 ft 6 in (1.68 m)	RS Sr	Hamilton College	Phoenix, New York
G	10	Ellen Kinnaird	5 ft 11 in (1.8 m)	Sr	Olentangy High School	Lewis Center, Ohio
G	11	Maddie Vejsicky	6 ft 0 in (1.83 m)	Jr	San Diego	New Concord, Ohio
G	12	Liz Murphy	5 ft 9 in (1.75 m)	Fr	Albury Wodonga Bandits	Yackandandah, Australia
C	14	Liisa Taponen	6 ft 5 in (1.96 m)	Jr	Illinois	Tampere, Finland
G	22	Teniesha Clarke	5 ft 9 in (1.75 m)	So	Niagara Prep	Burlington, Ontario
G	23	Zakia Rasheed	5 ft 8 in (1.73 m)	Sr	Bishop Chatard High School	Avon, Indiana
G	24	Ella Wigal	6 ft 0 in (1.83 m)	So	Liberty	Granville, Ohio
G	30	Caroline Lyles	6 ft 0 in (1.83 m)	Jr	Tulsa	Argyle, Texas
F	33	Ni'Rah Clark	6 ft 2 in (1.88 m)	Fr	Rogers High School	Toledo, Ohio
F	34	Lanae Riley	6 ft 0 in (1.83 m)	Jr	Middle Tennessee	Akron, Ohio

Head coach

- Ryan Gensler (Saint Joseph's)

Assistant coach(es)

- Jessica Jenkins (St. Bonaventure)
- Sarah Jones (Villanova)
- Erin Mills-Reid (Fairleigh Dickinson)

Legend

- (C) Team captain
- (S) Suspended
- (I) Ineligible
- (W) Walk-on
- Injured
- Current redshirt

Roster
Last update: March 2, 2025

== Schedule and results ==
Date time, TV	Rank^{#}	Opponent^{#}	Result	Record	High points	High rebounds	High assists	Site (attendance) city, state
Non-conference regular season
November 4, 2024*; 6:00 pm, ESPN+		Georgia State; MAC–SBC Challenge	W 81–73	1–0	25 – Rhodes	11 – Brown	5 – Rhodes	James A. Rhodes Arena (334); Akron, OH
November 7, 2024*; 7:30 pm, ESPN+		at Binghamton	L 50–66	1–1	14 – Brown	14 – Brown	2 – Tied	Dr. Bai Lee Court (1,631); Vestal, NY
November 13, 2024*; 6:00 pm, ESPN+		Robert Morris	L 53–59	1–2	15 – Brown	10 – Brown	3 – Tied	James A. Rhodes Arena (701); Akron, OH
November 16, 2024*; 12:00 pm, ESPN+		Cleveland State	W 85–74	2–2	20 – Clarke	7 – Brown	4 – Rasheed	James A. Rhodes Arena (518); Akron, OH
November 22, 2024*; 8:00 pm		at Tennessee State	L 68–72	2–3	15 – Vejsicky	8 – Brown	4 – Rasheed	Gentry Center (98); Nashville, TN
November 24, 2024*; 2:00 pm, ESPN+		at Bellarmine	L 65–72	2–4	18 – Mobley	6 – Vejsicky	4 – Rhodes	Knights Hall (441); Louisville, KY
November 29, 2024*; 4:00 pm, YouTube		vs. Iona; Colgate Tournament	W 64–51	3–4	13 – Clarke	9 – Brown	3 – Tied	Cotterell Court (207); Hamilton, NY
November 30, 2024*; 4:00 pm, ESPN+		at Colgate; Colgate Tournament	L 45–62	3–5	12 – Rhodes	7 – Brown	2 – Tied	Cotterell Court (327); Hamilton, NY
December 4, 2024*; 6:00 pm		Slippery Rock	W 79–43	4–5	15 – Vejsicky	7 – Tied	6 – Rasheed	James A. Rhodes Arena (134); Akron, OH
December 7, 2024*; 12:00 pm, ESPN+		Canisius	W 82–43	5–5	16 – Taponen	10 – Brown	6 – Rasheed	James A. Rhodes Arena (418); Akron, OH
December 20, 2024*; 12:00 pm, ESPN+		No. 20 Michigan	L 55–96	5–6	14 – Brown	11 – Taponen	2 – Tied	James A. Rhodes Arena (1,156); Akron, OH
December 28, 2024*; 2:00 pm		Miami Hamilton	W 80–52	6–6	30 – Mobley	13 – Clark	5 – Tied	James A. Rhodes Arena (256); Akron, OH
MAC regular season
January 1, 2025; 4:00 pm, ESPN+		at Ohio	W 74–61	7–6 (1–0)	20 – Clarke	11 – Clark	5 – Rasheed	Convocation Center (558); Athens, OH
January 4, 2025; 2:00 pm, ESPN+		Toledo	L 54–74	7–7 (1–1)	23 – Mobley	8 – Brown	2 – Brown	James A. Rhodes Arena (276); Akron, OH
January 8, 2025; 6:00 pm, ESPN+		Northern Illinois	W 73–71	8–7 (2–1)	21 – Rasheed	11 – Brown	4 – Tied	James A. Rhodes Arena (426); Akron, OH
January 11, 2025; 1:00 pm, ESPN+		at Eastern Michigan	W 61–56	9–7 (3–1)	17 – Hall	8 – Brown	5 – Mobley	George Gervin GameAbove Center (1,118); Ypsilanti, MI
January 15, 2025; 6:00 pm, ESPN+		Central Michigan	L 55–75	9–8 (3–2)	20 – Brown	9 – Brown	3 – Rasheed	James A. Rhodes Arena (312); Akron, OH
January 18, 2025; 11:30 am, ESPN+		at Ball State	L 57–80	9–9 (3–3)	16 – Mobley	10 – Taponen	4 – Hall	Worthen Arena; Muncie, IN
January 22, 2025; 7:00 pm, ESPN+		at Miami (OH)	L 54–76	9–10 (3–4)	15 – Brown	11 – Brown	3 – Vejsicky	Millett Hall (209); Oxford, OH
January 25, 2025; 4:30 pm, ESPN+		Buffalo	L 71–80	9–11 (3–5)	21 – Brown	9 – Mobley	4 – Tied	James A. Rhodes Arena (432); Akron, OH
January 29, 2025; 7:00 pm, ESPN+		at Bowling Green	L 69–82	9–12 (3–6)	22 – Brown	12 – Brown	3 – Tied	Stroh Center (1,611); Bowling Green, OH
February 1, 2025; 1:00 pm, ESPN+		at Kent State	L 51–73	9–13 (3–7)	15 – Brown	7 – Brown	2 – Tied	MAC Center (2,256); Kent, OH
February 5, 2025; 6:00 pm, ESPN+		Western Michigan	L 64–70	9–14 (3–8)	32 – Brown	19 – Brown	3 – Tied	James A. Rhodes Arena (291); Akron, OH
February 8, 2025*; 11:00 am, ESPN+		at Georgia Southern; MAC–SBC Challenge	L 36–60	9–15	19 – Brown	10 – Brown	2 – Brown	Hill Convocation Center (643); Statesboro, GA
February 15, 2025; 2:00 pm, ESPN+		at Toledo	L 54–75	9–16 (3–9)	16 – Clark	5 – Tied	3 – Mobley	Savage Arena (5,227); Toledo, OH
February 19, 2025; 6:00 pm, ESPN+		Miami (OH)	L 58–70	9–17 (3–10)	24 – Brown	9 – Brown	2 – Tied	James A. Rhodes Arena (171); Akron, OH
February 22, 2025; 2:00 pm, ESPN+		Ohio	L 62–70	9–18 (3–11)	16 – Vejsicky	11 – Clark	5 – Hall	James A. Rhodes Arena (336); Akron, OH
February 26, 2025; 7:00 pm, ESPN+		at Western Michigan	L 66–77	9–19 (3–12)	19 – Brown	9 – Brown	5 – Mobley	University Arena (321); Kalamazoo, MI
March 1, 2025; 12:00 pm, ESPN+		Kent State	L 44–64	9–20 (3–13)	16 – Mobley	10 – Brown	2 – Brown	James A. Rhodes Arena (397); Akron, OH
March 5, 2025; 6:00 pm, ESPN+		Eastern Michigan						James A. Rhodes Arena; Akron, OH
March 8, 2025; 1:00 pm, ESPN+		at Central Michigan						McGuirk Arena; Mount Pleasant, MI
*Non-conference game. ^{#}Rankings from AP poll. (#) Tournament seedings in parentheses. All times are in Eastern.
