= 2024–25 Kent State Golden Flashes women's basketball team =

American college basketball season

2024–25 Kent State Golden Flashes women's basketball
- Conference: Mid-American Conference
- Record: 21–12 (12–6 MAC)
- Head coach: Todd Starkey (9th season)
- Associate head coach: Fran Recchia
- Assistant coaches: Alexa Golden; Paige Salisbury
- Home arena: MAC Center

2024–25 Mid-American Conference women's basketball standings
	Conf.				Overall
Team	W		L	PCT	W		L	PCT
Ball State †	16	–	2	.889	27	–	8	.771
Toledo	13	–	5	.722	24	–	9	.727
Buffalo	13	–	5	.722	30	–	7	.811
Kent State	12	–	6	.667	21	–	12	.636
Miami (OH)	11	–	7	.611	19	–	12	.613
Bowling Green	11	–	7	.611	18	–	13	.581
Central Michigan	9	–	9	.500	14	–	17	.452
Western Michigan	8	–	10	.444	12	–	18	.400
Northern Illinois	6	–	12	.333	13	–	17	.433
Akron	4	–	14	.222	10	–	21	.323
Ohio	4	–	14	.222	6	–	23	.207
Eastern Michigan	1	–	17	.056	2	–	27	.069
† 2025 MAC tournament winner

The 2024–25 Kent State Golden Flashes women's basketball team represented Kent State University during the 2024–25 NCAA Division I women's basketball season. The Golden Flashes, led by ninth-year head coach Todd Starkey, played their home games at the Memorial Athletic and Convocation Center, also known as the MAC Center, in Kent, Ohio as members of the Mid-American Conference (MAC).

The Golden Flashes finished the season 21–12, 12–6 in MAC play, to finish in fourth place. They defeated Miami (OH) in the quarterfinals of the MAC tournament before falling to Ball State in the semifinals.

== Previous season ==
The Golden Flashes finished the 2023–24 season 21–12, 13–5 in MAC play, to finish in third place. They defeated Northern Illinois, Ball State and Buffalo to win the MAC tournament championship, earning the conference's automatic bid to the NCAA tournament, their first tournament appearance since 2002. They received the #15 seed in the Albany Regional 1, where they fell to #2 region seed Notre Dame in the first round.

== Preseason ==
On October 22, 2024, the MAC released the preseason coaches poll. Kent State was picked to finish second in the MAC regular season. They received one vote to win the MAC tournament.

=== Preseason rankings ===
MAC preseason poll
Predicted finish	Team	Votes (1st place)
1	Ball State	120 (10)
2	Kent State	104 (2)
3	Buffalo	98
4	Bowling Green	96
5	Toledo	82
T–6	Northern Illinois	64
T–6	Ohio	64
8	Miami (OH)	44
9	Akron	43
10	Western Michigan	34
11	Eastern Michigan	23
12	Central Michigan	20

MAC tournament champions: Ball State (8), Bowling Green (1), Buffalo (1), Kent State (1), Toledo (1)

=== Preseason All-MAC ===
Preseason All-MAC teams
Team	Player	Year
1st	Jenna Batsch	Senior

== Roster ==
2024–25 Kent State Golden Flashes women's basketball team
Players
Coaches

Pos.	#	Name	Height	Year	Previous school	Hometown
G	0	Kaley Perkins	6 ft 0 in (1.83 m)	RS Jr	Oklahoma	Houston, TX
F	1	Tatiana Thomas	5 ft 10 in (1.78 m)	Jr	Bolingbrook High School	Bolingbrook, IL
G	2	Meghan Murray	5 ft 5 in (1.65 m)	Fr	Hampton High School	Hampton Township, PA
G	3	Corynne Hauser	5 ft 7 in (1.7 m)	Jr	Rochester Area High School	Rochester, PA
G	4	Journey Hildebrand	5 ft 11 in (1.8 m)	Fr	Brunswick High School	Brunswick, OH
F	5	Bianca Juzzo	5 ft 11 in (1.8 m)	Sr	New Mexico Junior College	Ribeirão Preto, Brazil
G	10	Eléna Maier	5 ft 9 in (1.75 m)	RS Jr	Waunakee Community High School	Waunakee, WI
G	11	Lexy Linton	5 ft 8 in (1.73 m)	Sr	Jackson Memorial High School	Westampton, NJ
G	12	Jenna Batsch	6 ft 2 in (1.88 m)	Sr	Loveland High School	Loveland, OH
F	15	Bridget Dunn	6 ft 3 in (1.91 m)	Sr	Carmel High School	Carmel, IN
G	21	Dionna Gray	5 ft 4 in (1.63 m)	Jr	Huntington High School	Huntington, WV
G	22	Joy Bergstrom	5 ft 9 in (1.75 m)	RS Fr	South Dakota	Mount Prospect, IL
G	23	Mya Babbitt	5 ft 8 in (1.73 m)	So	Millard South High School	Papillion, NE
C	30	Riley Rismiller	6 ft 4 in (1.93 m)	So	Dayton	Coldwater, OH
F	34	Janae Tyler	6 ft 1 in (1.85 m)	So	Holt High School	Lansing, MI

Head coach

- Todd Starkey (Montreat)

Assistant coach(es)

- Fran Recchia (Virginia Tech)
- Alexa Golden (Kent State)
- Paige Salisbury (Kent State)

Legend

- (C) Team captain
- (S) Suspended
- (I) Ineligible
- (W) Walk-on
- Injured
- Current redshirt

Roster
Last update: February 26, 2025

== Schedule and results ==
Date time, TV	Rank^{#}	Opponent^{#}	Result	Record	High points	High rebounds	High assists	Site (attendance) city, state
Non-conference regular season
November 4, 2024*; 7:00 p.m., ESPN+		James Madison; MAC–SBC Challenge	L 56–67	0–1	20 – Rismiller	10 – Dunn	2 – Perkins	MAC Center (1,350); Kent, OH
November 7, 2024*; 7:00 p.m., Boxcast TV		Walsh	W 113–54	1–1	20 – Babbitt	12 – Dunn	7 – Murray	MAC Center (1,242); Kent, OH
November 14, 2024*; 7:00 p.m., ACCNX		at No. 13 NC State	L 51–79	1–2	17 – Dunn	8 – Dunn	3 – Batsch	Reynolds Coliseum (4,368); Raleigh, NC
November 16, 2024*; 8:00 p.m., FloHoops		at Elon	L 63–66	1–3	18 – Batsch	10 – Dunn	3 – Dunn	Schar Center (691); Elon, NC
November 20, 2024*; 7:00 p.m., ESPN+		Duquesne	W 81–61	2–3	20 – Gray	8 – Tyler	5 – Gray	MAC Center (1,147); Kent, OH
November 23, 2024*; 1:00 p.m., ESPN+		Xavier	W 89–69	3–3	25 – Babbitt	12 – Dunn	7 – Gray	MAC Center (1,059); Kent, OH
November 28, 2024*; 1:30 p.m.		vs. Brown; Puerto Rico Clasico	W 74–51	4–3	16 – Babbitt	8 – Rismiller	5 – Gray	Coliseo Rubén Rodríguez (100); Bayamón, Puerto Rico
November 29, 2024*; 1:30 p.m.		vs. Colorado State; Puerto Rico Clasico	L 54–60	4–4	13 – Gray	10 – Dunn	5 – Batsch	Coliseo Rubén Rodríguez; Bayamón, Puerto Rico
December 5, 2024*; 3:00 p.m., ESPN+		at Niagara	W 89–73	5–4	23 – Babbitt	12 – Dunn	6 – 2 tied	Gallagher Center (371); Lewiston, NY
December 16, 2024*; 11:00 a.m., Boxcast TV		Virginia–Lynchburg	W 103–41	6–4	17 – Batsch	12 – Dunn	13 – Murray	MAC Center (478); Kent, OH
December 19, 2024*; 5:00 p.m., ESPN+		at Coppin State	L 61–67 ^{OT}	6–5	13 – Gray	18 – Dunn	5 – Batsch	Physical Education Complex (295); Baltimore, MD
December 29, 2024*; 1:00 p.m., Boxcast TV		John Carroll	W 97–59	7–5	18 – Babbitt	9 – Dunn	8 – Gray	MAC Center (1,239); Kent, OH
MAC regular season
January 1, 2025; 1:00 p.m., ESPN+		Bowling Green	W 81–71	8–5 (1–0)	15 – Batsch	7 – 2 tied	4 – Batsch	MAC Center (1,078); Kent, OH
January 5, 2025; 2:00 p.m., CBSSN		Buffalo	W 82–73	9–5 (2–0)	23 – Batsch	16 – Dunn	5 – 2 tied	MAC Center (1,203); Kent, OH
January 8, 2025; 7:00 p.m., ESPN+		at Toledo	L 59–70	9–6 (2–1)	14 – Batsch	7 – Rismiller	6 – Babbitt	Savage Arena (4,055); Toledo, OH
January 11, 2025; 3:30 p.m., ESPN+		at Ohio	W 79–64	10–6 (3–1)	19 – Batsch	10 – Dunn	8 – Batsch	Convocation Center (4,011); Athens, OH
January 15, 2025; 7:00 p.m., ESPN+		Ball State	L 57–66	10–7 (3–2)	13 – 2 tied	15 – Dunn	5 – Batsch	MAC Center (1,157); Kent, OH
January 18, 2025; 1:00 p.m., ESPN+		Western Michigan	W 80–50	11–7 (4–2)	19 – Batsch	11 – Dunn	6 – 2 tied	MAC Center (2,448); Kent, OH
January 22, 2025; 11:00 a.m., ESPN+		at Central Michigan	W 77–56	12–7 (5–2)	16 – Batsch	6 – 2 tied	6 – Batsch	McGuirk Arena (1,510); Mount Pleasant, MI
January 25, 2025; 1:00 p.m., ESPN+		at Miami (OH)	W 77–63	13–7 (6–2)	19 – Batsch	13 – Dunn	4 – Babbitt	Millett Hall (364); Oxford, OH
January 29, 2025; 7:00 p.m., ESPN+		Eastern Michigan	W 79–59	14–7 (7–2)	33 – Batsch	7 – Babbitt	9 – Gray	MAC Center (1,239); Kent, OH
February 1, 2025; 1:00 p.m., ESPN+		Akron	W 73–51	15–7 (8–2)	25 – Batsch	13 – Rismiller	4 – Dunn	MAC Center (2,256); Kent, OH
February 5, 2025; 7:00 p.m., ESPN+		at Northern Illinois	L 69–73	15–8 (8–3)	17 – Babbitt	12 – Dunn	4 – Gray	Convocation Center (1,401); DeKalb, IL
February 8, 2025*; 2:00 p.m., ESPN+		at Troy; MAC–SBC Challenge	W 84–73	16–8	26 – Tyler	8 – Dunn	9 – Gray	Trojan Arena (2,412); Troy, AL
February 15, 2025; 1:00 p.m., ESPN+		Miami (OH)	L 62–64	16–9 (8–4)	18 – Tyler	8 – Dunn	5 – Batsch	MAC Center (1,180); Kent, OH
February 19, 2025; 6:00 p.m., ESPN+		at Buffalo	L 70–76	16–10 (8–5)	17 – 2 tied	10 – Tyler	8 – Gray	Alumni Arena (1,436); Amherst, NY
February 22, 2025; 12:00 p.m., ESPNU/ESPN+		at Ball State	W 60–54	17–10 (9–5)	18 – Batsch	13 – Dunn	4 – 2 tied	Worthen Arena; Muncie, IN
February 26, 2025; 7:00 p.m., ESPN+		Northern Illinois	W 76–58	18–10 (10-5)	14 – Gray	15 – Dunn	9 – Gray	MAC Center (1,082); Kent, OH
March 1, 2025; 12:00 p.m., ESPN+		at Akron	W 64–44	19–10 (11–5)	21 – 2 tied	12 – Tyler	9 – Gray	James A. Rhodes Arena (397); Akron, OH
March 5, 2025; 7:00 p.m.		at Bowling Green	L 61–84	19–11 (11–6)	25 – 2 tied	8 – Kohler	6 – Fleming	Stroh Center (1,671); Bowling Green, OH
March 8, 2025; 1:00 p.m., ESPN+		Toledo	W 69–62	20–11 (12–6)	27 – Batsch	13 – Dunn	5 – Dunn	MAC Center (1.754); Kent, OH
MAC tournament
March 12, 2025; 1:30 p.m., ESPN+	(4)	vs. (5) Miami (OH); Quarterfinals	W 68–61	21–11	19 – Babbitt	16 – Dunn	6 – Gray	Rocket Arena; Cleveland, OH
March 14, 2025; 10:00 a.m., ESPN+	(4)	vs. (1) Ball State; Semifinals	L 53–70	21–12	14 – Batsch	13 – Dunn	3 – Batsch	Rocket Arena; Cleveland, OH
*Non-conference game. ^{#}Rankings from AP poll. (#) Tournament seedings in parentheses. All times are in Eastern.
