= Ally Becki =

American basketball player

No. 0 – MGS Panserraikos Serres
- Title: Guard
- League: Greek A1 League

Personal information
- Born: March 14, 2003 (age 23) Brownsburg, Indiana, U.S.
- Listed height: 5 ft 8 in (1.73 m)

Career information
- High school: Brownsburg (Brownsburg, Indiana)
- College: Ball State (2021–2025)
- WNBA draft: 2025: undrafted
- Playing career: 2025–present
- Position: Guard
- Number: 0

Career history
- 2025–26 Greek A1 League season–present: MGS Panserraikos Serres

Career highlights
- MAC Women's Basketball Player of the Year (2025); MAC All Conference tournament team (2022, 2025); First-team All-Mid-American Conference (2024, 2025); All-MAC Defense Team (2024, 2025); MAC tournament MVP (2025)

Allysyn Becki (born March 14, 2003) is an American professional basketball player for MGS Panserraikos Serres of the Greek A1 League in Greece. She played college basketball for the Ball State Cardinals of the Mid-American Conference.

== College career ==
Becki began, and ended, her college career at Ball State. She won plenty of awards and recognition from her Freshman-Junior seasons, helping Ball State to a 41–14 record under Brady Sallee.

Her biggest success came when she led the Ball State Cardinals to the 2025 NCAA women's March Madness tournament in her 2024–25 senior year, being named the MAC women's basketball tournament MVP. She was also named the MAC women's basketball player of the year.

== Professional Career ==
=== Overseas ===
Ally Becki went undrafted in the WNBA Draft and went to basketball overseas. She signed with MGS Panserraikos Serres of the Greek A1 League for the 2025–26 season.
