= Shane Clipfell =

American basketball player and coach

Biographical details
- Born: August 29, 1963 (age 63); Niles, Michigan, U.S.
- Education: Eastern Michigan University

Coaching career (HC unless noted)
- 1994–1995: Glen Oaks Community College (asst.)
- 1995–1998: Glen Oaks Community College
- 1998–2006: Eastern Michigan (asst.)
- 2006–2007: Eastern Michigan (interim HC)
- 2007–2012: Michigan State (asst.)
- 2012–2025: Western Michigan

Head coaching record
- Overall: 255–256 (.499)

Shane Clipfell (born August 29, 1963) is an American former basketball coach who was the head coach of the Western Michigan University women's basketball team for 13 seasons.

== Career ==
He accepted the head coaching position at Western Michigan in April 2012. Prior to Western Michigan he was on Suzy Merchant's staff at Eastern Michigan from 1998 to 2007 and Michigan State from 2007 to 2012. He was acting as the head coach for much of the 2006–07 season while Merchant was on maternity leave. Early in his career he was an assistant coach and the head coach at Glen Oaks Community College and Colon High School. He compiled a 58–35 overall record at Glen Oaks. His 1997 team finished ranked #3 in the NJCAA and he was National District Coach of the Year. He led the Colon Magi to seven league titles, a Final Four, and a 185–65 overall record in 11 total years at the helm and was Michigan Regional Coach of the Year in 1992, 1994 and 1995.

He had previously played basketball and football at Colon High School.

He announced his retirement from coaching on March 17, 2025.

== Head coaching record ==
Record table
Season	Team	Overall	Conference	Standing	Postseason
Eastern Michigan (Mid-American Conference) (2005–2007)
2006–07	Eastern Michigan	13–12*	10–6*		
Eastern Michigan:		13–12 (.520)	10–6 (.625)		
Western Michigan (Mid-American Conference) (2012–2025)
2012–13	Western Michigan	11–20	7–11	8th	
2013–14	Western Michigan	13–18	8–10	7th	
2014–15	Western Michigan	20–13	11–7	T-2nd (West)	WNIT First Round
2015–16	Western Michigan	17–15	8–10	5th (West)	
2016–17	Western Michigan	19–13	8–10	5th (West)	
2017–18	Western Michigan	18–15	9–9	3rd (West)	
2018–19	Western Michigan	10–20	4–13	5th (West)	
2019–20	Western Michigan	18–13	10–8	3rd (West)	
2020–21	Western Michigan	6–15	5–14	10th	
2021–22	Western Michigan	16–14	10–10	T-6th	
2022–23	Western Michigan	12–17	7–11	T-7th	
2023–24	Western Michigan	12–18	7–11	8th	
2024–25	Western Michigan	12–18	8–10	8th	
Western Michigan:		184–209 (.468)	102–134 (.432)		
Total:		255–256 (.499)**			
National champion Postseason invitational champion Conference regular season champion Conference regular season and conference tournament champion Division regular season champion Division regular season and conference tournament champion Conference tournament champion

* Acting as head coach. Suzy Merchant missed all but four games of 2006–07 while on maternity leave. EMU was 3–1 under Merchant
** Overall Record includes his 58–35 record at Glen Oaks.

== Personal life ==
While an assistant at Eastern Michigan he earned a bachelor's degree in communications. He and his wife, Connie, have two children.
