= Brady Sallee =

American basketball coach

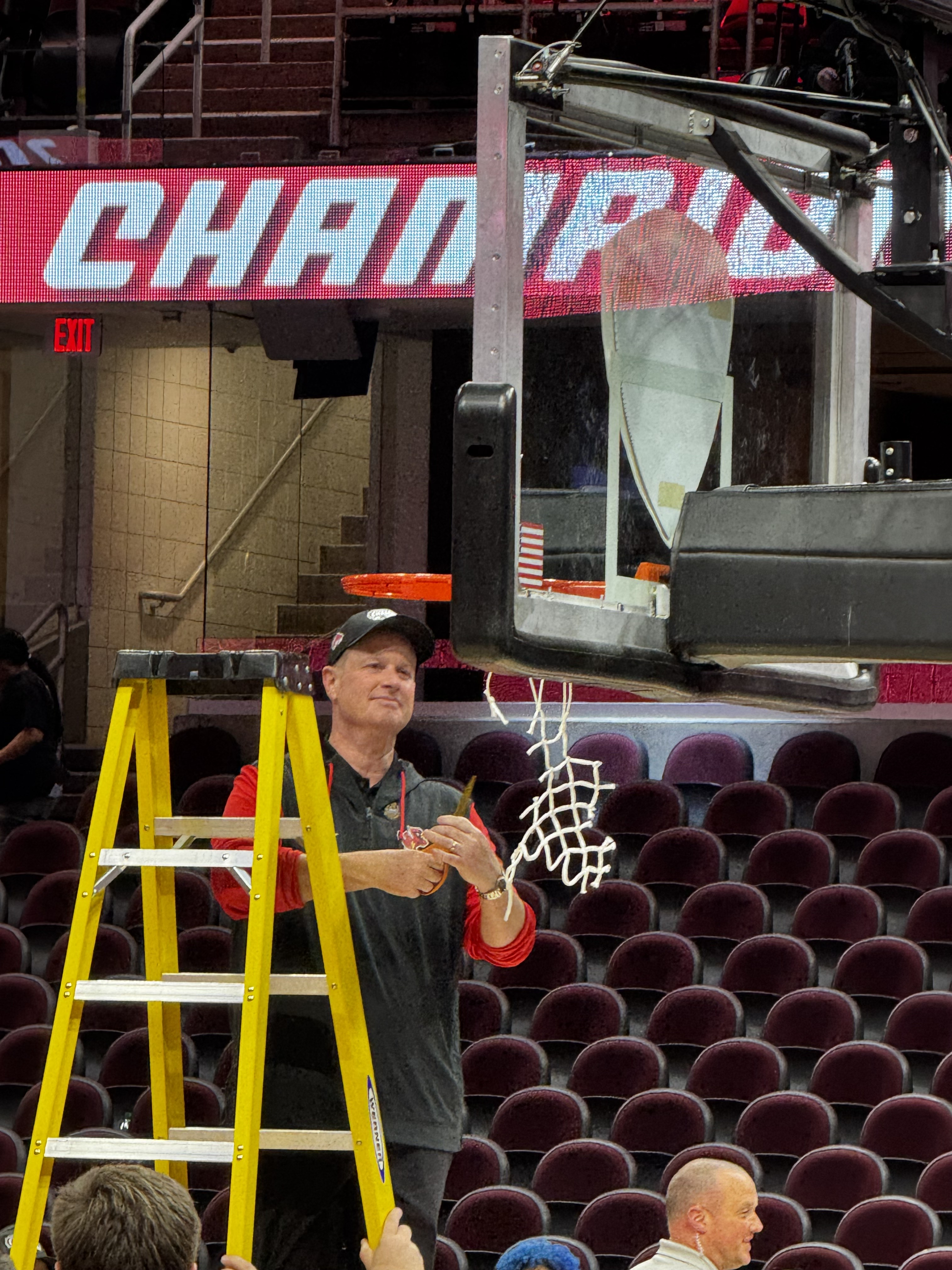
- Sallee in 2025

Current position
- Title: Head coach
- Team: Ball State
- Conference: MAC
- Record: 290–162 (.642)

Biographical details
- Born: Lexington, Kentucky, U.S.

Playing career
- 1990–1993: Thomas More (baseball)

Coaching career (HC unless noted)
- 1994–1995: Idaho State (asst.)
- 1996–2002: Kent State (asst.)
- 2002–2003: East Carolina (asst.)
- 2004–2012: Eastern Illinois
- 2012–present: Ball State

Head coaching record
- Overall: 426–272 (.610)

Accomplishments and honors

Championships
- OVC regular season (2010); MAC West Division (2015); MAC Tournament (2025); 2 MAC regular season (2025, 2026)

Awards
- MAC Coach of the Year (2025)

Brady Sallee is an American women's college basketball coach. He is the current head women's basketball coach at Ball State University. He previously held the same position at Eastern Illinois University (EIU) in Charleston, Illinois.

== Biography ==
A native of Lexington, Kentucky, Sallee played collegiate baseball and served as a student assistant with the women's basketball team at Thomas More College in Crestview Hills, Kentucky from 1990 to 1993. In 1993, he graduated from Thomas More with a bachelor's degree in business administration. Sallee and his wife Mandy have three children: Avery, Taryn and Drew.

== Coaching career ==
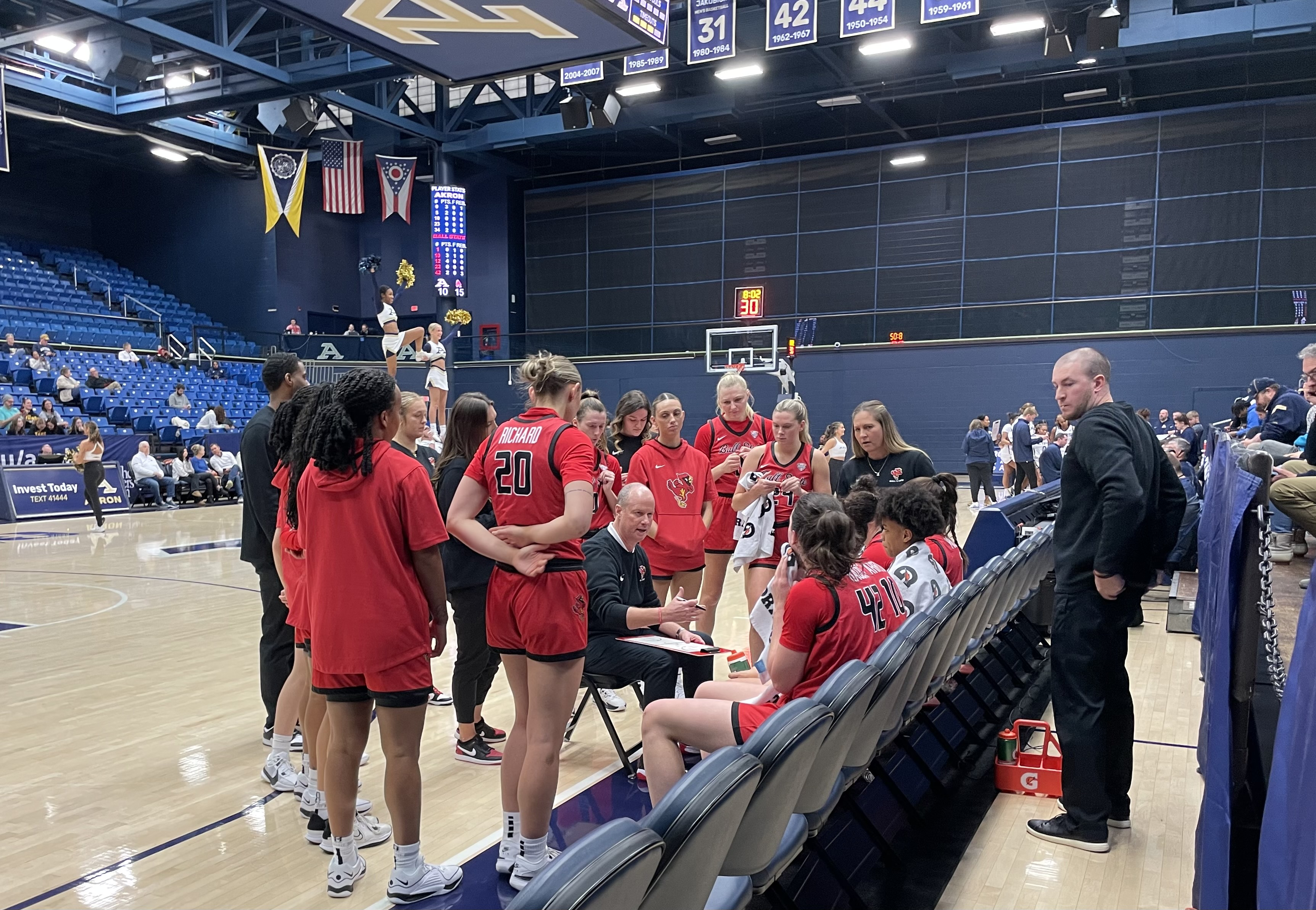
Sallee coaching in 2024

After graduating from Thomas More, Sallee spent two years as an assistant coach and recruiting coordinator at Idaho State University. He then held the same job for seven years with the Kent State Golden Flashes.

=== Eastern Illinois (2004–2012) ===
In 2004, Sallee was hired as the head coach at Eastern Illinois University. During his tenure at Eastern Illinois, he led the Panthers to the school's most successful string of seasons in Division I.

=== Ball State (2012–present) ===
On May 11, 2012, Sallee was named the eleventh women's basketball head coach at Ball State University in Muncie, Indiana. On December 4, 2017, Sallee led Ball State to its first win over state rival Purdue since 1979, snapping a 16-game losing streak to the Boilermakers.

In 2018, Sallee became the winningest coach in program history.

In the 2019–20 season, Sallee orchestrated a 13-game turnaround from the 2018–19 season which is the 30th largest single-season turnaround in NCAA Division I Women's Basketball.

In the 2023–24 season, Sallee led the Cardinals to a school record 28 wins. The Cardinals were also selected to play in the inaugural Women's Basketball Invitation Tournament. The Cardinals lost to Belmont in the first round.

In the 2024–25 season, not only did he lead them to another successful season, Sallee won MAC coach of the year. He also led them to the #1 seed in the conference tournament, and won the conference tournament. This gave Ball State their second title in program history and the second time Ball State would be in the NCAA women's basketball tournament. The Cardinals shared the MAC regular season championship the following year.

Since Sallee took over the program, the Cardinals have reached the postseason eight times. In addition, he has coached thirty-six all-conference selections, three conference freshman players of the year, three conference defensive players of the year, two conference players of the year, and one Associated Press All-American Selection.

== Head coaching record ==
Record table
Season	Team	Overall	Conference	Standing	Postseason
Eastern Illinois Panthers (Ohio Valley Conference) (2004–2012)
2004–05	Eastern Illinois	9–17	3–13	t-10th	
2005–06	Eastern Illinois	10–19	9–11	t-7th	
2006–07	Eastern Illinois	10–19	7–13	9th	
2007–08	Eastern Illinois	19–13	15–5	t-2nd	1–1 (OVC)
2008–09	Eastern Illinois	24–9	15–3	2nd	2–1 (OVC)
2009–10	Eastern Illinois	23–11	16–2	1st	2–1 (OVC), 0–1 (WNIT)
2010–11	Eastern Illinois	18–13	13–5	t-3rd	0–1 (OVC), 0–1 (WBI)
2011–12	Eastern Illinois	22–9	13–3	2nd	WNIT first round
Eastern Illinois:		136–110 (.553)	91–55 (.623)		
Ball State Cardinals (Mid-American Conference) (2012–present)
2012–13	Ball State	17–16	12–4	2nd (West)	WNIT 3rd round
2013–14	Ball State	18–17	9–9	2nd (West)	WNIT 1st round
2014–15	Ball State	17–14	13–5	1st (West)	WNIT 1st round
2015–16	Ball State	22–10	13–5	2nd (West)	WNIT 2nd round
2016–17	Ball State	21–11	14–4	2nd (West)	WNIT 1st round
2017–18	Ball State	25–7	13–5	2nd (West)	WNIT 2nd round
2018–19	Ball State	8–23	3–15	6th (West)	
2019–20	Ball State	21–10	13–5	2nd (West)	
2020–21	Ball State	14–11	12–8	1st (West)	
2021–22	Ball State	20–13	11–8	4th	WNIT 1st round
2022–23	Ball State	26–8	14–4	t-2nd	WNIT 2nd round
2023–24	Ball State	28–6	16–2	2nd	WBIT 1st round
2024–25	Ball State	27–8	16–2	1st	NCAA First Round
2025–26	Ball State	26–7	16–2	t-1st	
2026–27	Ball State	1-0	0-0		
Ball State:		291–162 (.642)	174–78 (.690)		
Total:		427–272 (.611)			
National champion Postseason invitational champion Conference regular season champion Conference regular season and conference tournament champion Division regular season champion Division regular season and conference tournament champion Conference tournament champion
