= Canisius Golden Griffins women's basketball =

College basketball team at Canisius University

Canisius Golden Griffins
2025–26 Canisius Golden Griffins women's basketball team
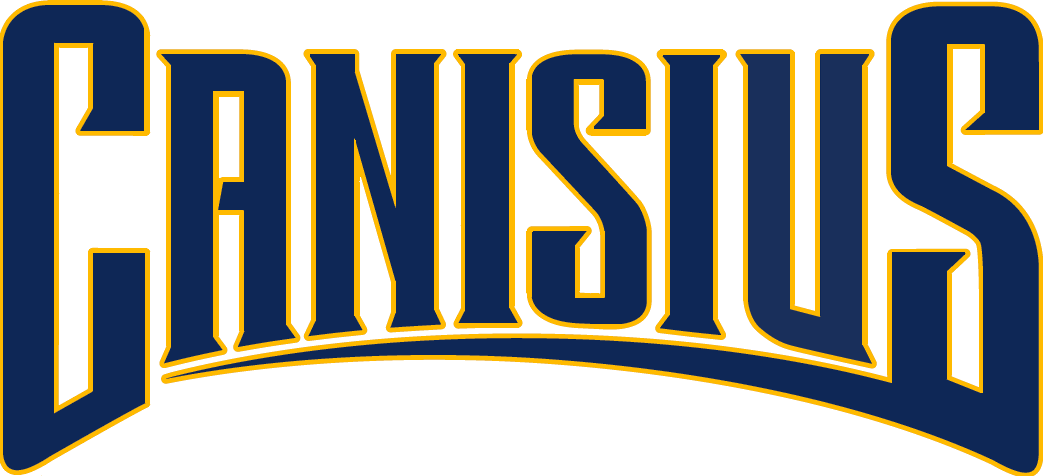
- University: Canisius University
- Head coach: Tiffany Swoffard (2nd season)
- Conference: MAAC
- Location: Buffalo, New York
- Arena: Koessler Center (capacity: 2,176)
- Nickname: Golden Griffins
- Colors: Blue and gold

Uniforms
Home	Away

NCAA tournament Elite Eight
- 1983 (Division II)
Other NCAA tournament results
Sweet Sixteen	1983 (Division II)
Appearances	1983 (Division II); 2005

Conference tournament champions
- MAAC: 2005

The Canisius Golden Griffins women's basketball team is the women's basketball team that represents Canisius University in Buffalo, New York. The team currently competes in the Metro Atlantic Athletic Conference.

== History ==
Canisius began play in 1975. They made one NCAA Division II Tournament in their time in the secondary division, making it to the Elite Eight in 1983. They played in the Upstate New York Conference from 1982 to 1986 and the Middle Eastern College Association for the 1986-87 season. They joined the MAAC in 1989. They made the WNIT in 2009.

=== NCAA Division I appearances ===
The Golden Griffins have made one NCAA Division I Tournament appearance. They have a record of 0-1.

Year	Round	Opponent	Result
2005	First Round	Duke	L 48-80

=== NCAA Division II appearances ===
The Golden Griffins made one NCAA Division II Tournament appearance. They have a record of 1-1.

Year	Round	Opponent	Result
1983	Regional Finals; National Quarterfinals	Long Island-C.W. Post; South Connecticut	W 71–59; L 60–63

=== WNIT appearances ===
Year	Round	Opponent	Result
2009	First Round	Syracuse	L 65-90
