= 2024–25 Buffalo Bulls women's basketball team =

American college basketball season

2024–25 Buffalo Bulls women's basketball

WNIT Champions
- Conference: Mid-American Conference
- Record: 30–7 (13–5 MAC)
- Head coach: Becky Burke (3rd season)
- Associate head coach: Jacey Brooks
- Assistant coaches: James Ewing; Erin Sinnott
- Home arena: Alumni Arena

2024–25 Mid-American Conference women's basketball standings
| | Conf. | | | | Overall |
| Team | W | | L | PCT | W | | L | PCT |
|---|---|---|---|---|---|---|---|---|
| Ball State † | 16 | – | 2 | .889 | 27 | – | 8 | .771 |
| Toledo | 13 | – | 5 | .722 | 24 | – | 9 | .727 |
| Buffalo | 13 | – | 5 | .722 | 30 | – | 7 | .811 |
| Kent State | 12 | – | 6 | .667 | 21 | – | 12 | .636 |
| Miami (OH) | 11 | – | 7 | .611 | 19 | – | 12 | .613 |
| Bowling Green | 11 | – | 7 | .611 | 18 | – | 13 | .581 |
| Central Michigan | 9 | – | 9 | .500 | 14 | – | 17 | .452 |
| Western Michigan | 8 | – | 10 | .444 | 12 | – | 18 | .400 |
| Northern Illinois | 6 | – | 12 | .333 | 13 | – | 17 | .433 |
| Akron | 4 | – | 14 | .222 | 10 | – | 21 | .323 |
| Ohio | 4 | – | 14 | .222 | 6 | – | 23 | .207 |
| Eastern Michigan | 1 | – | 17 | .056 | 2 | – | 27 | .069 |
† 2025 MAC tournament winner

The 2024–25 Buffalo Bulls women's basketball team represented the University at Buffalo during the 2024–25 NCAA Division I women's basketball season. The Bulls, led by third-year head coach Becky Burke, played their home games at Alumni Arena in Amherst, New York as members of the Mid-American Conference. Buffalo won the WNIT championship over Troy.

== Previous season ==
The Bulls finished the 2023–24 season 19–14, 10–8 in MAC play to finish in a tie for fourth place. In the MAC tournament, they were defeated by Kent State in the championship. They received an automatic bid to the WNIT, where they would be defeated by Monmouth in the first round.

== Roster ==
2024–25 Buffalo Bulls women's basketball team
Players
Coaches

| Pos. | # | Name | Height | Year | Previous school | Hometown |
|---|---|---|---|---|---|---|
| G | 2 | Mallory Daly | 5 ft 8 in (1.73 m) | Fr | Seton-La Salle Catholic High School | Pittsburgh, Pennsylvania |
| G | 4 | Noelani Cornfield | 5 ft 6 in (1.68 m) | RS Sr | Southern Miss | Gowanda, New York |
| G | 5 | Sitota Gines | 5 ft 10 in (1.78 m) | Sr | St. John's | Zaragoza, Spain |
| G | 7 | Aniya Rowe | 5 ft 7 in (1.7 m) | Fr | AZ Compass Prep | Rochester, New York |
| G | 10 | Kirsten Lewis-Williams | 5 ft 10 in (1.78 m) | So | Lake Norman High School | Mooresville, North Carolina |
| G | 12 | Paula Lopez | 5 ft 8 in (1.73 m) | So | Elite Sports Academy | Alicante, Spain |
| G | 13 | Makenna Shaffer | 6 ft 1 in (1.85 m) | So | Florida SouthWestern State College | Greeley, Colorado |
| F | 15 | Ariana Seawell | 6 ft 2 in (1.88 m) | Sr | Maryland Eastern Shore | Bronx, New York |
| G | 20 | Caylen Spano | 5 ft 7 in (1.7 m) | Fr | McDowell High School | Erie, Pennsylvania |
| G | 21 | Terah Harness | 5 ft 9 in (1.75 m) | Sr | Marshall | New Carlisle, Ohio |
| G/F | 23 | Alexis Davis | 6 ft 0 in (1.83 m) | So | Woodbury High School | Woodbury, New Jersey |
| F | 30 | Jordyn Beaty | 6 ft 0 in (1.83 m) | Sr | Texas A&M–Commerce | Woodville, Texas |
| F | 31 | Jaylin Hartman | 6 ft 2 in (1.88 m) | So | George Washington | Mendham, New Jersey |
| G | 35 | Chellia Watson | 5 ft 8 in (1.73 m) | RS Sr | USC Upstate | Winder, Georgia |

Head coach

- Becky Burke (Louisville)

Assistant coach(es)

- Jacey Brooks (Canisius)
- James Ewing (Mercyhurst)
- Erin Sinnott (Daemen)

Legend

- (C) Team captain
- (S) Suspended
- (I) Ineligible
- (W) Walk-on
- Injured
- Current redshirt

Roster
Last update: December 10, 2024

== Schedule and results ==
| Date time, TV | Rank^{#} | Opponent^{#} | Result | Record | Site (attendance) city, state |
Exhibition
| October 27, 2024*; 2:00 pm | | Daemen | W 82–38 | – | Alumni Arena (–); Amherst, NY |
Non-conference regular season
| November 4, 2024*; 6:00 pm, ESPN+ | | Troy; MAC-SBC Challenge | W 80–78 | 1–0 | Alumni Arena (1,055); Amherst, NY |
| November 8, 2024*; 6:00 pm, ESPN+ | | Buffalo State | W 123–44 | 2–0 | Alumni Arena (1,215); Amherst, NY |
| November 13, 2024*; 7:00 pm, ESPN+ | | at Maryland Eastern Shore | W 56–46 | 3–0 | Hytche Athletic Center (129); Princess Anne, MD |
| November 18, 2024*; 6:00 pm, ESPN+ | | Cedarville | W 77–57 | 4–0 | Alumni Arena (987); Amherst, NY |
| November 22, 2024*; 6:00 pm, ESPN+ | | at Canisius | W 62–50 | 5–0 | Koessler Athletic Center (550); Buffalo, NY |
| November 26, 2024*; 6:00 pm, ESPN+ | | at Niagara | W 86–53 | 6–0 | Gallagher Center (463); Lewiston, NY |
| November 30, 2024*; 2:00 pm, ESPN+ | | St. Bonaventure | W 74–46 | 7–0 | Alumni Arena (1,091); Amherst, NY |
| December 4, 2024*; 6:00 pm, ESPN+ | | Binghamton | W 74–51 | 8–0 | Alumni Arena (1,005); Amherst, NY |
| December 14, 2024*; 2:00 pm, ESPN+ | | Stony Brook | W 72–55 | 9–0 | Alumni Arena (1,082); Amherst, NY |
| December 19, 2024*; 1:00 pm, ESPN+ | | Vermont | W 70–68 | 10–0 | Alumni Arena (875); Amherst, NY |
| December 28, 2024*; 12:00 pm, NEC Front Row | | at Le Moyne | W 107–59 | 11–0 | Ted Grant Court (259); DeWitt, NY |
MAC regular season
| January 1, 2025; 6:00 pm, ESPN+ | | Central Michigan | W 81–55 | 12–0 (1–0) | Alumni Arena (2,001); Amherst, NY |
| January 5, 2025; 2:00 pm, CBSSN | | at Kent State | L 73–82 | 12–1 (1–1) | MAC Center (1,203); Kent, OH |
| January 8, 2025; 7:00 pm, ESPN+ | | at Bowling Green | W 70-60 | 13-1 (2–1) | Stroh Center (1,690); Bowling Green, OH |
| January 11, 2025; 2:00 pm, ESPN+ | | Ball State | L 56-78 | 13-2 (2-2) | Alumni Arena (1,242); Amherst, NY |
| January 15, 2025; 6:30 pm, ESPN+ | | at Eastern Michigan | W 77-55 | 14-2 (3-2) | George Gervin GameAbove Center (1,132); Ypsilanti, MI |
| January 18, 2025; 2:00 pm, ESPN+ | | Miami (OH) | W 59-51 | 15-2 (4-2) | Alumni Arena (1,362); Amherst, NY |
| January 22, 2025; 6:00 pm, ESPN+ | | Ohio | W 72-55 | 16-2 (5-2) | Alumni Arena (1,047); Amherst, NY |
| January 25, 2025; 4:30 pm, ESPN+ | | at Akron | W 80-71 | 17-2 (6-2) | James A. Rhodes Arena (432); Akron, OH |
| January 29, 2025; TBA | | at Western Michigan | W 73-40 | 18-2 (7-2) | University Arena (723); Kalamazoo, MI |
| February 1, 2025; 2:00 pm, ESPN+ | | Northern Illinois | W 84-58 | 19-2 (8-2) | Alumni Arena (2,055); Amherst, NY |
| February 5, 2025; 11:00 am, ESPN+ | | Toledo | L 55-58 | 19-3 (8-3) | Alumni Arena (4,906); Amherst, NY |
| February 8, 2025*; 4:00 pm, ESPN+ | | Coastal Carolina; MAC-SBC Challenge | L 65-73 | 19-4 | HTC Center (694); Conway, SC |
| February 15, 2025; 1:00 pm, ESPN+ | | at Ohio | W 79-67 | 20-4 (9-3) | Convocation Center (886); Athens, OH |
| February 19, 2025; 6:00 pm, ESPN+ | | Kent State | W 76-70 | 21-4 (10-3) | Alumni Arena (1,436); Amherst, NY |
| February 22, 2025; 1:00 pm, ESPN+ | | at Miami (OH) | W 68-54 | 22-4 (11-3) | Millett Hall (1,318); Oxford, OH |
| February 26, 2025; 7:00 pm, ESPN+ | | at Toledo | L 68-71 | 22-5 (11-4) | Savage Arena (4,037); Toledo, OH |
| March 1, 2025; 2:00 pm, ESPN+ | | Eastern Michigan | W 71-54 | 23-5 (12-4) | Alumni Arena (2,386); Amherst, NY |
| March 5, 2025; 6:30 pm, ESPN+ | | at Ball State | L 60–72 | 23–6 (12–5) | Worthen Arena (1,755); Muncie, IN |
| March 8, 2025; 2:00 pm, ESPN+ | | Western Michigan | W 80–54 | 24–6 (13–5) | Alumni Arena (2,008); Amherst, NY |
MAC tournament
| March 12, 2025; 6:30 pm, ESPN+ | (3) | vs. (6) Bowling Green; Quarterfinals | W 65–63 | 25–6 | Rocket Mortgage FieldHouse (2,487); Cleveland, OH |
| March 14, 2025; 12:30 pm, ESPN+ | (3) | vs. (2) Toledo; Semifinals | L 49–56 | 25–7 | Rocket Mortgage FieldHouse (2,797); Cleveland, OH |
WNIT
| March 23, 2025*; 2:00 pm, ESPN+ | | UMass; Second Round | W 84–82 ^{OT} | 26–7 | Alumni Arena (947); Amherst, NY |
| March 27, 2025*; 7:00 pm, ESPN+ | | at Southern Indiana; Super 16 | W 76–64 | 27–7 | Screaming Eagles Arena (2,102); Evansville, IN |
| March 30, 2025*; 2:00 pm, ESPN+ | | Rutgers; Great 8 | W 71–64 | 28–7 | Alumni Arena (2,042); Amherst, NY |
| April 2, 2025*; 6:00 pm, ESPN+ | | Cleveland State; Fab 4 | W 74–69 | 29–7 | Alumni Arena (3,088); Amherst, NY |
| April 5, 2025*; 4:00 p.m., CBSSN | | Troy; Championship | W 88–84 | 30–7 | Alumni Arena (5,650); Amherst, NY |
*Non-conference game. ^{#}Rankings from AP Poll. (#) Tournament seedings in parentheses. All times are in Eastern.
