= 2024–25 Toledo Rockets women's basketball team =

American college basketball season

2024–25 Toledo Rockets women's basketball

Cherokee Invitational Champions

WBIT, first round
- Conference: Mid-American Conference
- Record: 24–9 (13–5 MAC)
- Head coach: Ginny Boggess (1st season)
- Associate head coach: Geoff Lanier
- Assistant coaches: Jackie Alexander; Takima Keane
- Home arena: Savage Arena

2024–25 Mid-American Conference women's basketball standings
	Conf.				Overall
Team	W		L	PCT	W		L	PCT
Ball State †	16	–	2	.889	27	–	8	.771
Toledo	13	–	5	.722	24	–	9	.727
Buffalo	13	–	5	.722	30	–	7	.811
Kent State	12	–	6	.667	21	–	12	.636
Miami (OH)	11	–	7	.611	19	–	12	.613
Bowling Green	11	–	7	.611	18	–	13	.581
Central Michigan	9	–	9	.500	14	–	17	.452
Western Michigan	8	–	10	.444	12	–	18	.400
Northern Illinois	6	–	12	.333	13	–	17	.433
Akron	4	–	14	.222	10	–	21	.323
Ohio	4	–	14	.222	6	–	23	.207
Eastern Michigan	1	–	17	.056	2	–	27	.069
† 2025 MAC tournament winner

The 2024–25 Toledo Rockets women's basketball team represented the University of Toledo during the 2024–25 NCAA Division I women's basketball season. The Rockets, led by first-year head coach Ginny Boggess, played their home games at Savage Arena in Toledo, Ohio as members of the Mid-American Conference.

== Previous season ==
The Rockets finished the 2023–24 season 28–6, 17–1 in MAC play, to finish as MAC regular-season champions for the third consecutive season. They defeated Western Michigan, before being upset by #4 seed Buffalo in the semifinals of the MAC tournament. They received an automatic bid to the WBIT, where they defeated Cleveland State in the first round and St. John's in the second round, before falling to Washington State in the quarterfinals.

On April 5, 2024, it was announced that longtime head coach Tricia Cullop would be leaving the program after 16 seasons, in order to take the head coaching position at Miami (FL). On April 9, the school announced that they would be hiring Monmouth head coach Ginny Boggess as Cullop's successor.

== Preseason ==
On October 22, 2024, the MAC released the preseason coaches poll. Toledo was picked to finish fifth in the MAC regular season. Toledo received 1 vote to win the MAC Tournament.

=== Preseason rankings ===
MAC preseason poll
Predicted finish	Team	Votes (1st place)
1	Ball State	120 (10)
2	Kent State	104 (2)
3	Buffalo	98
4	Bowling Green	96
5	Toledo	82
T-6	Northern Illinois	64
T-6	Ohio	64
8	Miami (OH)	44
9	Akron	43
10	Western Michigan	34
11	Eastern Michigan	23
12	Central Michigan	20

MAC tournament champions: Ball State (8), Bowling Green (1), Buffalo (1), Kent State (1), Toledo (1)

=== Preseason All-MAC ===
Preseason All-MAC teams
Team	Player	Year
2nd	Sammi Mikonowicz	Graduate student

== Roster ==
2024–25 Toledo Rockets women's basketball team
Players
Coaches

Pos.	#	Name	Height	Year	Previous school	Hometown
G/F	1	Nan Garcia	6 ft 0 in (1.83 m)	GS	Penn State	Jeffersonville, Indiana
G	2	Faith Fedd-Robinson	5 ft 11 in (1.8 m)	Fr	Newark Central High School	Newark, New Jersey
G	4	Kendall Carruthers	5 ft 7 in (1.7 m)	So	Saint Francis (PA)	Toledo, Ohio
G	9	Heidi Smith	6 ft 1 in (1.85 m)	Fr	J. Addison School	London, Ontario
PF	10	Evalyse Cole	6 ft 2 in (1.88 m)	Fr	Easton Area High School	Easton, Pennsylvania
G	11	Destiny Robinson	5 ft 7 in (1.7 m)	Fr	Fremont Ross High School	Fremont, Ohio
G	12	Ella Weaver	6 ft 0 in (1.83 m)	So	William Monroe High School	Ruckersville, Virginia
G	14	Cadence Dykstra	5 ft 8 in (1.73 m)	So	West Catholic High School	Grand Rapids, Michigan
G	22	Khera Goss	5 ft 9 in (1.75 m)	GS	Ben Davis High School	Indianapolis, Indiana
G	23	Kendall Braden	5 ft 8 in (1.73 m)	Fr	Toledo Christian Schools	Toledo, Ohio
G	24	Courtney Smith	6 ft 1 in (1.85 m)	Fr	J. Addison School	London, Ontario
G/F	33	Sammi Mikonowicz	5 ft 10 in (1.78 m)	GS	Rossford High School	Rossford, Ohio
F	34	Jessica Cook	6 ft 2 in (1.88 m)	Sr	Cicero–North Syracuse High School	Clay, New York
C	51	Hannah Noveroske	6 ft 5 in (1.96 m)	GS	Indiana	Michigan City, Indiana

Head coach

- Ginny Boggess (Wingate)

Assistant coach(es)

- Geoff Lanier (Southern Connecticut)
- Jackie Alexander (Cumberlands)
- Takima Keane (Cleveland State)

Legend

- (C) Team captain
- (S) Suspended
- (I) Ineligible
- (W) Walk-on
- Injured
- Current redshirt

Roster
Last update: February 25, 2025

== Schedule and results ==
Date time, TV	Rank^{#}	Opponent^{#}	Result	Record	High points	High rebounds	High assists	Site (attendance) city, state
Exhibition
October 27, 2024*; 2:00 pm		Findlay	W 87–54	–	16 – Goss	5 – Tied	3 – Tied	Savage Arena; Toledo, OH
Non-conference regular season
November 4, 2024*; 7:00 pm, ESPN+		Marshall; MAC–SBC Challenge	W 71–68	1–0	16 – Noveroske	8 – Noveroske	4 – Goss	Savage Arena (3,754); Toledo, OH
November 13, 2024*; 7:00 pm, BTN		at Iowa	L 57–94	1–1	17 – Mikonowicz	7 – Noveroske	5 – Dykstra	Carver–Hawkeye Arena (14,998); Iowa City, IA
November 17, 2024*; 2:00 pm, ESPN+		Northern Kentucky	W 76–73	2–1	19 – Goss	7 – Tied	3 – Carruthers	Savage Arena (4,023); Toledo, OH
November 22, 2024*; 7:00 pm, ESPN+		Long Beach State	W 79–72	3–1	19 – Carruthers	5 – Tied	7 – Dykstra	Savage Arena (4,046); Toledo, OH
November 30, 2024*; 1:00 pm, ESPN+		at Navy; Navy Classic	W 58–51	4–1	27 – Mikonowicz	11 – Garcia	2 – Tied	Alumni Hall; Annapolis, MD
December 1, 2024*; 3:30 pm, ESPN+		vs. No. 10 Maryland; Navy Classic	L 70–92	4–2	13 – Garcia	6 – Dykstra	5 – Carruthers	Alumni Hall (887); Annapolis, MD
December 6, 2024*; 7:00 pm, ESPN+		Mercyhurst	W 70–66	5–2	15 – Fedd-Robinson	12 – Mikonowicz	2 – Tied	Savage Arena (3,814); Toledo, OH
December 18, 2024*; 7:00 pm, Stadium		vs. Troy; Cherokee Invitational semifinals	W 70–62	6–2	13 – Mikonowicz	9 – Mikonowicz	6 – Dykstra	Harrah's Cherokee (678); Cherokee, NC
December 19, 2024*; 9:30 pm, Stadium		vs. Liberty; Cherokee Invitational championship	W 71–63	7–2	18 – Goss	9 – Noveroske	3 – Goss	Harrah's Cherokee (1,176); Cherokee, NC
December 28, 2024*; 2:00 pm, ESPN+		Defiance	W 114–30	8–2	16 – Fedd-Robinson	9 – Cook	7 – Robinson	Savage Arena (4,241); Toledo, OH
MAC regular season
January 1, 2025; 4:00 pm, ESPN+		Northern Illinois	L 58–59	8–3 (0–1)	16 – Carruthers	9 – Mikonowicz	3 – Robinson	Savage Arena (3,830); Toledo, OH
January 4, 2025; 2:00 pm, ESPN+		at Akron	W 74–54	9–3 (1–1)	20 – Mikonowicz	5 – Tied	3 – Tied	James A. Rhodes Arena (276); Akron, OH
January 8, 2025; 7:00 pm, ESPN+		Kent State	W 70–59	10–3 (2–1)	12 – Goss	9 – Robinson	4 – Carruthers	Savage Arena (4,055); Toledo, OH
January 11, 2025; 1:00 pm, ESPN+		at Central Michigan	W 71–66	11–3 (3–1)	20 – Mikonowicz	6 – Tied	3 – Carruthers	McGuirk Arena (1,162); Mount Pleasant, MI
January 15, 2025; 7:00 pm, ESPN+		at Western Michigan	L 38–41	11–4 (3–2)	11 – Goss	8 – Fedd-Robinson	2 – Tied	University Arena (711); Kalamazoo, MI
January 18, 2025; 2:00 pm, ESPN+		Ohio	W 80–65	12–4 (4–2)	23 – Goss	7 – Robinson	5 – Tied	Savage Arena (4,337); Toledo, OH
January 20, 2025; 11:00 am, CBSSN		at Ball State	L 63–77	12–5 (4–3)	17 – Garcia	8 – Mikonowicz	4 – Robinson	Worthen Arena (1,810); Muncie, IN
January 25, 2025; 2:00 pm, ESPN+		Bowling Green	W 80–68	13–5 (5–3)	21 – Carruthers	6 – Tied	7 – Garcia	Savage Arena (6,527); Toledo, OH
January 29, 2025; 7:00 pm, ESPN+		Miami (OH)	W 64–59	14–5 (6–3)	17 – Tied	6 – Tied	5 – Garcia	Savage Arena (4,187); Toledo, OH
February 1, 2025; 2:00 pm, ESPN+		at Eastern Michigan	W 77–49	15–5 (7–3)	17 – Mikonowicz	6 – Tied	4 – Dykstra	George Gervin GameAbove Center (1,055); Ypsilanti, MI
February 5, 2025; 11:00 am, ESPN+		at Buffalo	W 58–55	16–5 (8–3)	14 – Tied	9 – Mikonowicz	4 – Tied	Alumni Arena (4,906); Amherst, NY
February 8, 2025*; 2:00 pm, ESPN+		at Old Dominion; MAC–SBC Challenge	W 56–52	17–5	13 – Garcia	14 – Mikonowicz	7 – Carruthers	Chartway Arena (1,646); Norfolk, VA
February 15, 2025; 2:00 pm, ESPN+		Akron	W 75–54	18–5 (9–3)	16 – Tied	6 – Tied	4 – Tied	Savage Arena (5,227); Toledo, OH
February 19, 2025; 7:00 pm, ESPN+		Ball State	W 70–66	19–5 (10–3)	23 – Mikonowicz	9 – Garcia	6 – Carruthers	Savage Arena (4,158); Toledo, OH
February 22, 2025; 7:00 pm, ESPN+		at Bowling Green	L 72–81	19–6 (10–4)	18 – Garcia	7 – Tied	4 – Cook	Stroh Center (3,687); Bowling Green, OH
February 26, 2025; 7:00 pm, ESPN+		Buffalo	W 71–68	20–6 (11–4)	15 – Fedd-Robinson	5 – Mikonowicz	6 – Dykstra	Savage Arena (4,037); Toledo, OH
March 1, 2025; 2:00 pm, ESPN+		Central Michigan	W 80–70	21–6 (12–4)	20 – Carruthers	5 – Mikonowicz	5 – Dykstra	Savage Arena (4,532); Toledo, OH
March 5, 2025; 7:00 pm, ESPN+		at Northern Illinois	W 79–70	22–6 (13–4)	19 – Mikonowicz	7 – Mikonowicz	3 – Carruthers	Convocation Center (480); DeKalb, IL
March 8, 2025; 1:00 pm, ESPN+		at Kent State	L 62–69	22–7 (13–5)	14 – Garcia	10 – Garcia	3 – Garcia	MAC Center (1,754); Kent, OH
MAC tournament
March 12, 2025; ESPN+	(2)	vs. (7) Central Michigan; Quarterfinals	W 76–58	23–7	18 – Mikonowicz	6 – Mikonowicz	5 – Carruthers	Rocket Arena; Cleveland, OH
March 14, 2025; ESPN+	(2)	vs. (3) Buffalo; Semifinals	W 56–49	24–7	13 – Garcia	15 – Garcia	3 – Mikonowicz	Rocket Arena (2,797); Cleveland, OH
March 15, 2025; CBSSN	(2)	vs. (1) Ball State; Championship	L 58–65	24–8	17 – Carruthers	7 – Mikonowicz	3 – Fedd-Robinson	Rocket Arena; Cleveland, OH
WBIT
March 20, 2025*; 7:00 p.m., ESPN+		(2) Minnesota; First round	L 53–65	24–9	11 – Goss	10 – Mikonowicz	2 – Mikonowicz	Savage Arena; Toledo, OH
*Non-conference game. ^{#}Rankings from AP poll. (#) Tournament seedings in parentheses. All times are in Eastern.
