= 2024–25 Maryland Terrapins women's basketball team =

American college basketball season

2024–25 Maryland Terrapins women's basketball
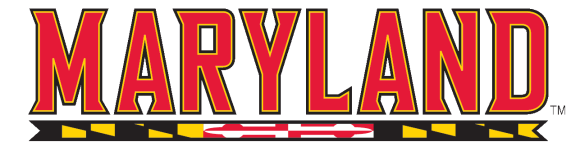

NCAA tournament, Sweet Sixteen
- Conference: Big Ten Conference

Ranking
- Coaches: No. 17
- AP: No. 18
- Record: 25–8 (13–5 Big Ten)
- Head coach: Brenda Frese (23rd season)
- Assistant coaches: Karen Blair (7th season); Kaitlynn Fratz (7th season); Lindsey Spann (5th season)
- Home arena: Xfinity Center

2024–25 Big Ten women's basketball standings
	Conf.				Overall
Team	W		L	PCT	W		L	PCT
No. 5 USC	17	–	1	.944	31	–	4	.886
No. 3 UCLA †	16	–	2	.889	34	–	3	.919
No. 19 Ohio State	13	–	5	.722	26	–	7	.788
No. 12 Maryland	13	–	5	.722	25	–	8	.758
No. 25 Michigan	11	–	7	.611	23	–	11	.676
Michigan State	11	–	7	.611	22	–	10	.688
Illinois	11	–	7	.611	22	–	10	.688
Oregon	10	–	8	.556	20	–	12	.625
Indiana	10	–	8	.556	20	–	13	.606
Nebraska	10	–	8	.556	21	–	12	.636
Iowa	10	–	8	.556	23	–	11	.676
Washington	9	–	9	.500	19	–	14	.576
Minnesota	8	–	10	.444	25	–	11	.694
Wisconsin	4	–	14	.222	13	–	17	.433
Rutgers	3	–	15	.167	13	–	20	.394
Purdue	3	–	15	.167	10	–	19	.345
Northwestern	2	–	16	.111	9	–	18	.333
Penn State	1	–	17	.056	10	–	19	.345
† 2025 Big Ten tournament winner As of April 7, 2025; Rankings from AP poll

The 2024–25 Maryland Terrapins women's basketball team represented the University of Maryland, College Park during the 2024–25 NCAA Division I women's basketball season. The Terrapins were led by head coach Brenda Frese in her 23rd season, and played their home games at the Xfinity Center in College Park, Maryland as a member of the Big Ten Conference.

== Previous season ==
The Terrapins finished the 2023–24 season with a 19–14 record, including 9–9 in Big Ten play, to finish tied in sixth place. They received an at-large bid to the 2024 NCAA Division I women's basketball tournament, where they were eliminated in the first round.

== Offseason ==
=== Departures ===
Maryland departures
Name	Number	Pos.	Height	Year	Hometown	Reason for departure
Riley Nelson	2	G	6' 2"	Freshman	Clarksburg, MD	Transferred to Duke
Lavender Briggs	3	G	6' 1"	Graduate student	Provo, UT	Graduated
Brinae Alexander	5	F	6' 0"	Graduate student	Murfreesboro, TN	Graduated
Jakia Brown-Turner	11	G	6' 0"	Graduate student	Oxon Hill, MD	Graduated
Faith Masonius	13	F	6' 1"	Graduate student	Spring Lake, NJ	Transferred to Seton Hall
Hawa Doumbouya	20	C	6' 7"	Freshman	Bronx, NY	Transferred to Virginia
Summer Bostock	33	G	6' 1"	Freshman	Toronto, ON	Transferred to Houston

=== Incoming transfers ===
Maryland transfers
Name	Pos.	Height	Year	Hometown	Previous school
Christina Dalce	F	6' 2"	Senior	Edison, NJ	Villanova
Amari DeBerry	F	6' 6"	Senior	Williamsville, NY	UConn
Mir McLean	G	5' 11"	Graduate student	Baltimore, MD	Virginia
Isimenme Ozzy-Momodou	F	6' 3"	Junior	London, England	Gulf Coast State
Saylor Poffenbarger	G	6' 2"	Redshirt junior	Middletown, MD	Arkansas
Kaylene Smikle	G	6' 0"	Junior	Bay Shore, NY	Rutgers
Sarah Te-Biasu	G	5' 5"	Graduate student	Montreal, QC	VCU

== Roster ==
2024–25 Maryland Terrapins women's basketball team
Players
Coaches

Pos.	#	Name	Height	Year	Previous school	Hometown
G	0	Shyanne Sellers	6 ft 2 in (1.88 m)	Sr	Aurora	Aurora, OH
G	1	Sarah Te-Biasu	5 ft 5 in (1.65 m)	GS	Niagara Prep; VCU	Montreal, QC
G	2	Kaylene Smikle	6 ft 0 in (1.83 m)	Jr	Westtown School; Rutgers	Bay Shore, NY
G	3	Emily Fisher	6 ft 0 in (1.83 m)	So	Libertyville	Libertyville, IL
G	5	Ava McKennie	6 ft 2 in (1.88 m)	Fr	McDonogh School	McSherrystown, PA
G	6	Saylor Poffenbarger	6 ft 2 in (1.88 m)	RS Jr	Middletown; Arkansas	Middletown, MD
G	8	Kyndal Walker	5 ft 9 in (1.75 m)	Fr	St. John's College	Beltsville, MD
G/F	10	Mir McLean	5 ft 11 in (1.8 m)	GS	Roland Park Country School; Virginia	Baltimore, MD
F	14	Allie Kubek	6 ft 2 in (1.88 m)	GS	Sanford School; Towson	Elkton, MD
F	15	Christina Dalce	6 ft 2 in (1.88 m)	Sr	Rutgers Prep; Villanova	Edison, NJ
F	21	Emma Chardon	6 ft 2 in (1.88 m)	RS Jr	CEC André-Chavanne	Geneva, Switzerland
F	22	Isimenme Ozzy-Momodou	6 ft 3 in (1.91 m)	Jr	Gulf Coast State	London, England
G	24	Bri McDaniel	5 ft 10 in (1.78 m)	Jr	Kenwood Academy	Chicago, IL
F	40	Breanna Williams	6 ft 2 in (1.88 m)	Fr	Skyview	Billings, MT
F	42	Amari DeBerry	6 ft 6 in (1.98 m)	Sr	Williamsville South; UConn	Williamsville, NY

Head coach

- Brenda Frese (Arizona)

Assistant coach(es)

- Karen Blair (SMU)
- Kaitlynn Fratz (California (PA))
- Lindsey Spann (Penn State)

Legend

- (C) Team captain
- (S) Suspended
- (I) Ineligible
- (W) Walk-on
- Injured
- Current redshirt

Roster

== Schedule and results ==
Date time, TV	Rank^{#}	Opponent^{#}	Result	Record	Site (attendance) city, state
Exhibition
October 20, 2024*; 1:00 p.m., B1G+	No. 18	Seton Hill (PA)	W 108–37	–	Xfinity Center; College Park, MD
October 30, 2024*; 6:00 p.m., B1G+	No. 18	Frostburg State	W 90–40	–	Xfinity Center; College Park, MD
Regular season
November 4, 2024*; 7:00 p.m., ESPN+	No. 18	at UMBC	W 74–32	1–0	Chesapeake Employers Insurance Arena (2,306); Catonsville, MD
November 7, 2024*; 6:00 p.m., B1G+	No. 18	Coppin State	W 70–47	2–0	Xfinity Center (5,040); College Park, MD
November 10, 2024*; 1:00 p.m., FS1	No. 18	No. 11 Duke	W 85–80	3–0	Xfinity Center (9,042); College Park, MD
November 13, 2024*; 7:00 p.m., ACCN	No. 11	at Syracuse	W 84–73	4–0	JMA Wireless Dome (2,427); Syracuse, NY
November 17, 2024*; 11:00 a.m., B1G+	No. 11	Towson	W 98–63	5–0	Xfinity Center (5,108); College Park, MD
November 24, 2024*; 1:00 p.m., B1G+	No. 11	Saint Francis (PA)	W 107–35	6–0	Xfinity Center (5,773); College Park, MD
November 30, 2024*; 3:30 p.m., ESPN+	No. 10	vs. George Mason; Navy Classic	W 66–56	7–0	Alumni Hall (1,305); Annapolis, MD
December 1, 2024*; 3:30 p.m., ESPN+	No. 10	vs. Toledo; Navy Classic	W 92–70	8–0	Alumni Hall (887); Annapolis, MD
December 3, 2024*; 7:00 p.m., B1G+	No. 7	Mount St. Mary's	W 87–52	9–0	Xfinity Center (4,678); College Park, MD
December 7, 2024; 2:00 p.m., B1G+	No. 7	at Purdue	W 78–69	10–0 (1–0)	Mackey Arena (6,203); West Lafayette, IN
December 19, 2024*; 11:00 am, B1G+	No. 8	William & Mary	W 107–57	11–0	Xfinity Center (17,950); College Park, MD
December 29, 2024; 1:00 p.m., B1G+	No. 8	No. 19 Michigan State	W 72–66	12–0 (2–0)	Xfinity Center (9,200); College Park, MD
January 2, 2025; 7:00 p.m., B1G+	No. 8	Rutgers	W 78–61	13–0 (3–0)	Xfinity Center (5,434); College Park, MD
January 5, 2025; 6:00 p.m., BTN	No. 8	at No. 23 Iowa	W 74–66	14–0 (4–0)	Carver–Hawkeye Arena (14,998); Iowa City, IA
January 8, 2025; 8:30 p.m., FS1	No. 8	No. 4 USC	L 74–79	14–1 (4–1)	Xfinity Center (14,735); College Park, MD
January 11, 2025; 2:30 p.m., BTN	No. 8	at Wisconsin	W 83–68	15–1 (5–1)	Kohl Center (4,115); Madison, WI
January 14, 2025; 7:00 p.m., BTN	No. 8	No. 24т Minnesota	W 99–92	16–1 (6–1)	Xfinity Center (5,049); College Park, MD
January 20, 2025*; 5:30 p.m., FOX	No. 8	vs. No. 7 Texas; Coretta Scott King Classic	L 51–89	16–2	Prudential Center (6,147); Newark, NJ
January 23, 2025; 6:00 p.m., BTN	No. 8	at No. 12 Ohio State	L 66–74	16–3 (6–2)	Value City Arena (7,082); Columbus, OH
January 26, 2025; 2:00 p.m., NBC	No. 8	No. 1 UCLA	L 67–82	16–4 (6–3)	Xfinity Center (13,648); College Park, MD
January 29, 2025; 6:00 p.m., B1G+	No. 14	at Penn State	W 82–73	17–4 (7–3)	Bryce Jordan Center (2,066); State College, PA
February 2, 2025; 1:00 p.m., B1G+	No. 14	Illinois	L 65–66	17–5 (7–4)	Xfinity Center (8,068); College Park, MD
February 6, 2025; 9:00 p.m., FS1	No. 16	at Oregon	W 79–61	18–5 (8–4)	Matthew Knight Arena (5,156); Eugene, OR
February 9, 2025; 4:00 p.m., B1G+	No. 16	at Washington	W 81–73	19–5 (9–4)	Alaska Airlines Arena (4,819); Seattle, WA
February 13, 2025; 6:30 p.m., BTN	No. 17	Nebraska	L 71–91	19–6 (9–5)	Xfinity Center (7,029); College Park, MD
February 17, 2025; 6:00 p.m., BTN	No. 21	Michigan	W 85–77	20–6 (10–5)	Xfinity Center (7,049); College Park, MD
February 20, 2025; 7:30 p.m., BTN	No. 21	at Northwestern	W 85–79	21–6 (11–5)	Welsh–Ryan Arena (1,726); Evanston, IL
February 27, 2025; 7:00 p.m., Peacock	No. 19	at Indiana	W 74–60	22–6 (12–5)	Simon Skjodt Assembly Hall (10,664); Bloomington, IN
March 2, 2025; 4:30 p.m., FS1	No. 19	No. 12 Ohio State	W 93–90 ^{OT}	23–6 (13–5)	Xfinity Center (9,335); College Park, MD
Big Ten tournament
March 7, 2025; 2:20 p.m., BTN	(4) No. 15	vs. (5) Michigan; Quarterfinals	L 71–98	23–7	Gainbridge Fieldhouse (7,352); Indianapolis, IN
NCAA tournament
March 22, 2025*; 4:00 p.m., ESPN	(4 B2) No. 18	(13 B2) Norfolk State; First round	W 82–69	24–7	Xfinity Center (7,040); College Park, MD
March 24, 2025*; 5:00 p.m., ESPN2	(4 B2) No. 18	(5 B2) No. 21 Alabama; Second round	W 111–108 ^{2OT}	25–7	Xfinity Center (5,052); College Park, MD
March 28, 2025*; 5:00 p.m., ESPN	(4 B2) No. 18	vs. (1 B2) No. 2 South Carolina; Sweet Sixteen	L 67–71	25–8	Legacy Arena (11,055); Birmingham, AL
*Non-conference game. ^{#}Rankings from AP poll. (#) Tournament seedings in parentheses. B2=Birmingham 2. All times are in Eastern.

== Rankings ==
Ranking movements Legend: ██ Increase in ranking ██ Decrease in ranking
	Week																				
Poll	Pre	1	2	3	4	5	6	7	8	9	10	11	12	13	14	15	16	17	18	19	Final
AP	18	11	11	10	7	7	8	8	8	8	8	8	14	16	17	21	19	15	18	18	
Coaches	18	14	13	11	8	7	8	8	7	7	9	10	14	15	15	18	17	15	17	17	
