= 2025 Coastal Athletic Association women's basketball tournament =

U.S. collegiate basketball event

2025 CAA women's basketball tournament
- Classification: Division I
- Season: 2024–25
- Teams: 14
- Site: CareFirst Arena; Washington, D.C.
- Television: FloHoops, CBSSN
- CAA women's basketball tournaments

2024–25 CAA women's basketball standings
	Conf.				Overall
Team	W		L	PCT	W		L	PCT
North Carolina A&T	15	–	3	.833	19	–	12	.613
Charleston	14	–	4	.778	25	–	8	.758
Campbell	12	–	6	.667	22	–	13	.629
Drexel	12	–	6	.667	17	–	13	.567
Monmouth	10	–	8	.556	16	–	15	.516
Elon	9	–	9	.500	15	–	15	.500
Delaware	9	–	9	.500	13	–	17	.433
Hofstra	9	–	9	.500	14	–	16	.467
William & Mary †	8	–	10	.444	16	–	19	.457
UNC Wilmington	8	–	10	.444	14	–	18	.438
Towson	8	–	10	.444	12	–	20	.375
Stony Brook	7	–	11	.389	12	–	18	.400
Hampton	3	–	15	.167	8	–	23	.258
Northeastern	2	–	16	.111	3	–	25	.107
† 2025 CAA tournament winner

The 2025 Coastal Athletic Association women's basketball tournament was the postseason women's college basketball tournament for the Coastal Athletic Association for the 2024-25 season. The tournament was held at the CareFirst Arena in Washington, D.C. from March 12-16. The winner of the tournament received the conference's automatic bid to the 2025 NCAA tournament.

== Seeds ==
All 14 CAA teams participated in the tournament. Teams were seeded by record within the conference, with a tiebreaker system to seed teams with identical conference records. The top 10 teams received a first-round bye and the top four teams received a double bye, automatically advancing them into the quarterfinals.

Seed	School	Conf.	Tiebreaker
1	North Carolina A&T	15–3	
2	Charleston	14–4	
3	Campbell	12–6	
4	Drexel	12–6	
5	Monmouth	10–8	
6	Elon	9–9	
7	Delaware	9–9	
8	Hofstra	9–9	
9	William & Mary	8–10	
10	UNC Wilmington	8–10	
11	Towson	8–10	
12	Stony Brook	7–11	
13	Hampton	3–15	
14	Northeastern	2–16	

== Schedule ==
Session	Game	Time*	Matchup	Score	Television
First Round – Wednesday, March 12
1	1	2:30 pm	No. 12 Stony Brook vs No. 13 Hampton	75 - 76	FloHoops
1	2	4:30 pm	No. 11 Towson vs No. 14 Northeastern	67 - 44	FloHoops
Second Round – Thursday, March 13
2	3	12:00 pm	No. 8 Hofstra vs No. 9 William & Mary	65 - 76	FloHoops
2	4	2:30 pm	No. 5 Monmouth vs No. 13 Hampton	62 - 54	FloHoops
3	5	6:00 pm	No. 7 Delaware vs No. 10 UNC Wilmington	71 - 55	FloHoops
3	6	8:30 pm	No. 6 Elon vs No. 11 Towson	47 - 53	FloHoops
Quarterfinals – Friday, March 14
4	7	12:00 pm	No. 1 North Carolina A&T vs No. 9 William & Mary	66 - 74^{OT}	FloHoops
4	8	2:30 pm	No. 4 Drexel vs No. 5 Monmouth	70 - 67^{OT}	FloHoops
5	9	6:00 pm	No. 2 Charleston vs No. 7 Delaware	87 - 50	FloHoops
5	10	8:30 pm	No. 3 Campbell vs No. 11 Towson	73 - 54	FloHoops
Semifinals – Saturday, March 15
6	11	2:00 pm	No. 9 William & Mary vs No. 4 Drexel	76 - 54	FloHoops
6	12	4:30 pm	No. 2 Charleston vs No. 3 Campbell	59 - 80	FloHoops
Championship – Sunday, March 16
7	13	2:00 pm	No. 9 William & Mary vs No. 3 Campbell	66 - 63	CBSSN
*Game times in EDT. Rankings denote tournament seed * denotes overtime game

== Bracket ==
First Round; Wednesday, March 12; FloHoops
12	Stony Brook	75
13	Hampton	76
11	Towson	67
14	Northeastern	44

Second Round; Thursday, March 13; FloHoops
8	Hofstra	65
9	William & Mary	76
5	Monmouth	62
13	Hampton	54
7	Delaware	71
10	UNC Wilmington	55
6	Elon	47
11	Towson	53

Quarterfinals; Friday, March 14; FloHoops
1	North Carolina A&T	66
9	William & Mary	74*
4	Drexel	70*
5	Monmouth	67
2	Charleston	87
7	Delaware	50
3	Campbell	73
11	Towson	54

Semifinals; Saturday, March 15; FloHoops
9	William & Mary	76
4	Drexel	54
2	Charleston	59
3	Campbell	80

Championship; Sunday, March 16; CBS Sports Network
9	William & Mary	66
3	Campbell	63

* denotes overtime game

== See also ==
- 2025 CAA men's basketball tournament
