= Becky Burke =

American women's basketball coach

Current position
- Title: Head coach
- Team: Arizona
- Conference: Big 12
- Record: 15–19 (.441)

Biographical details
- Born: December 20, 1989 (age 36)

Playing career
- 2008–2012: Louisville
- Position: Guard

Coaching career (HC unless noted)
- 2014–2015: Saint Joseph's (asst.)
- 2016–2018: Embry–Riddle
- 2018–2020: Charleston
- 2020–2022: USC Upstate
- 2022–2025: Buffalo
- 2025–present: Arizona

Administrative career (AD unless noted)
- 2013–2014: Cal State Fullerton (director of basketball operations)

Head coaching record
- Overall: 189–111 (.630)
- Tournaments: 0–1 (NCAA D2); 5–1 (WNIT)

Accomplishments and honors

Championships
- WNIT (2025)

Awards
- Big South Coach of the Year (2022)

Becky Burke (born December 20, 1989) is an American women's basketball coach and former player. As of 2025 she is the head coach at the University of Arizona.

== Career ==
She attended Abington Heights High School in Clarks Summit, Pennsylvania. She later attended the University of Louisville, where she played guard for the Louisville Cardinals women's basketball team. During her freshman season in 2008–09, Burke helped lead the Cardinals to the Final Four of the 2009 NCAA Division I women's basketball tournament, where they fell to UConn in the championship game, 76–54.

=== Louisville statistics ===
Legend
GP	Games played	GS	Games started	MPG	Minutes per game
FG%	Field goal percentage	3P%	3-point field goal percentage	FT%	Free throw percentage
RPG	Rebounds per game	APG	Assists per game	SPG	Steals per game
BPG	Blocks per game	PPG	Points per game	**Bold**	Career high

Year	Team	GP	Points	FG%	3P%	FT%	RPG	APG	SPG	BPG	PPG
2008–09	Louisville	**38**	191	38.2%	31.9%	88.4%	1.8	0.8	0.6	0.0	5.0
2009–10	Louisville	32	**440**	39.0%	35.8%	80.4%	2.9	**1.8**	**1.1**	**0.1**	**13.8**
2010–11	Louisville	33	278	**42.9%**	**38.8%**	**90.7%**	2.3	1.2	0.6	-	7.9
2011–12	Louisville	33	379	38.9%	37.9%	84.5%	**3.2**	1.2	0.9	0.1	11.5
Career		138	1288	39.6%	36.5%	84.6%	2.5	1.2	0.8	0.1	9.3

== Coaching career ==
After graduating from Louisville, Burke later went on to serve as an assistant women's basketball coach at Saint Joseph's College before serving as head women's basketball coach at Embry–Riddle Aeronautical University, Prescott from 2016 to 2018, the University of Charleston from 2018 to 2020, and the University of South Carolina Upstate from 2020 to 2022. On April 6, 2022, Burke was named head women's basketball coach at the University at Buffalo.

After a 30 season, a WNIT Championship, and a 61–37 record at Buffalo over three seasons, she took over as the head coach at Arizona on April 14, 2025.

== Head coaching record ==
Record table
Season	Team	Overall	Conference	Standing	Postseason
Embry–Riddle Eagles (California Pacific Conference) (2016–2018)
2016–17	Embry–Riddle	14–12	8–6	5th	
2017–18	Embry–Riddle	21–6	11–3	2nd	
Embry–Riddle:		35–18 (.660)	19–9 (.679)		
Charleston Golden Eagles (Mountain East Conference) (2018–2020)
2018–19	Charleston	25–7	18–4	2nd	NCAA Division II first round
2019–20	Charleston	23–7	17–5	3rd	
Charleston:		48–14 (.774)	35–9 (.795)		
USC Upstate Spartans (Big South Conference) (2020–2022)
2020–21	USC Upstate	8–15	5–11	9th	
2021–22	USC Upstate	22–8	14–4	3rd	
USC Upstate:		30–23 (.566)	19–15 (.559)		
Buffalo Bulls (Mid-American Conference) (2022–2025)
2022–23	Buffalo	12–16	7–11	T-7th	
2023–24	Buffalo	19–14	10–8	T-4th	WNIT first round
2024–25	Buffalo	30–7	13–5	T-2nd	WNIT Champions
Buffalo:		61–37 (.622)	30–24 (.556)		
Arizona Wildcats (Big 12 Conference) (2025–present)
2025–26	Arizona	12–18	3–15	T–14th	
2026–27	Arizona	3–1			
Arizona:		15–19 (.441)	3–15 (.167)		
Total:		189–111 (.630)			
National champion Postseason invitational champion Conference regular season champion Conference regular season and conference tournament champion Division regular season champion Division regular season and conference tournament champion Conference tournament champion
