= 2024–25 Ball State Cardinals women's basketball team =

American college basketball season

2024–25 Ball State Cardinals women's basketball

MAC regular-season and tournament champions

NCAA tournament, first round
- Conference: Mid-American Conference
- Record: 27–8 (16–2 MAC)
- Head coach: Brady Sallee (13th season)
- Associate head coach: Audrey Spencer
- Assistant coaches: Moriah Monaco; Casey Morrissette; Mariah King
- Home arena: Worthen Arena

2024–25 Mid-American Conference women's basketball standings
	Conf.				Overall
Team	W		L	PCT	W		L	PCT
Ball State †	16	–	2	.889	27	–	8	.771
Toledo	13	–	5	.722	24	–	9	.727
Buffalo	13	–	5	.722	30	–	7	.811
Kent State	12	–	6	.667	21	–	12	.636
Miami (OH)	11	–	7	.611	19	–	12	.613
Bowling Green	11	–	7	.611	18	–	13	.581
Central Michigan	9	–	9	.500	14	–	17	.452
Western Michigan	8	–	10	.444	12	–	18	.400
Northern Illinois	6	–	12	.333	13	–	17	.433
Akron	4	–	14	.222	10	–	21	.323
Ohio	4	–	14	.222	6	–	23	.207
Eastern Michigan	1	–	17	.056	2	–	27	.069
† 2025 MAC tournament winner

The 2024–25 Ball State Cardinals women's basketball team represented Ball State University during the 2024–25 NCAA Division I women's basketball season. The Cardinals, led by 13th-year head coach Brady Sallee, played their home games at Worthen Arena in Muncie, Indiana as members of the Mid-American Conference (MAC).

With a 16–2 record, 27–8 overall, the Cardinals finished first in the MAC and they defeated Western Michigan, Kent State and Toledo to win their second MAC tournament title, and first since 2009, to advance to the NCAA tournament. Ally Becki was the tournament MVP. As a 12 seed, they lost to Ole Miss in the Round of 64.

== Previous season ==
The Cardinals finished the 2023–24 season 28–6, 16–2 in MAC play, to finish in second place. They defeated Ohio before falling to eventual tournament champions Kent State in the semifinals of the MAC tournament. They received an at-large bid to the WBIT, where they were defeated by Belmont in the first round.

== Preseason ==
On October 22, 2024, the MAC released the preseason coaches poll. Ball State was picked to finish first in the MAC regular season. Ball State received eight votes to win the MAC tournament.

=== Preseason rankings ===
MAC preseason poll
Predicted finish	Team	Votes (1st place)
1	Ball State	120 (10)
2	Kent State	104 (2)
3	Buffalo	98
4	Bowling Green	96
5	Toledo	82
T–6	Northern Illinois	64
T–6	Ohio	64
8	Miami (OH)	44
9	Akron	43
10	Western Michigan	34
11	Eastern Michigan	23
12	Central Michigan	20

MAC tournament champions: Ball State (8), Bowling Green (1), Buffalo (1), Kent State (1), Toledo (1)

=== Preseason All-MAC ===
Preseason All-MAC teams
Team	Player	Year
1st	Ally Becki	Senior
2nd	Madelyn Bischoff	Senior

== Roster ==
2024–25 Ball State Cardinals women's basketball team
Players
Coaches

Pos.	#	Name	Height	Year	Previous school	Hometown
G	0	Ally Becki	5 ft 8 in (1.73 m)	Sr	Brownsburg High School	Brownsburg, IN
F	2	Maliyah "MJ" Johnson	6 ft 3 in (1.91 m)	GS	Texas A&M	Chicago, IL
G	3	Sydney Bolden	5 ft 8 in (1.73 m)	Jr	Loganville High School	Loganville, GA
G	11	Lachelle Austin	5 ft 7 in (1.7 m)	Sr	Eastern Michigan	Redford, MI
F	14	Marie Kiefer	6 ft 2 in (1.88 m)	Sr	Bishop Brossart High School	Alexandria, KY
G	15	Ashlynn Brooke	5 ft 6 in (1.68 m)	So	Pioneer High School	Royal Center, IN
F	20	Alex Richard	6 ft 1 in (1.85 m)	Sr	Butler	Avon, IN
C	22	Tessa Towers	6 ft 5 in (1.96 m)	Jr	Wisconsin	Batavia, IL
G	23	Zuri Ransom	5 ft 10 in (1.78 m)	Fr	Evanston High School	Evanston, IL
G	24	Madelyn Bischoff	5 ft 9 in (1.75 m)	Sr	Roncalli High School	Indianapolis, IN
G	25	Grace Kingery	5 ft 11 in (1.8 m)	Fr	North Ridgeville High School	North Ridgeville, OH
G	30	Hailey Smith	5 ft 10 in (1.78 m)	So	Fishers High School	Fishers, IN
G	31	Olivia Smith	5 ft 10 in (1.78 m)	So	Fishers High School	Fishers, IN
F	42	Elise Stuck	6 ft 1 in (1.85 m)	GS	Michigan	Charlevoix, MI

Head coach

- Brady Sallee (Thomas More)

Assistant coach(es)

- Audrey Spencer (Ball State)
- Moriah Monaco (Ball State)
- Casey Morrissette (Mount Union)
- Mariah King (Eastern Illinois)

Legend

- (C) Team captain
- (S) Suspended
- (I) Ineligible
- (W) Walk-on
- Injured
- Current redshirt

Roster
Last update: February 25, 2025

== Schedule and results ==
Date time, TV	Rank^{#}	Opponent^{#}	Result	Record	High points	High rebounds	High assists	Site (attendance) city, state
Exhibition
October 30, 2024*; 6:30 p.m.		IU Kokomo	W 98–45	–	–	–	–	Worthen Arena; Muncie, IN
Non-conference regular season
November 4, 2024*; 6:30 p.m., ESPN+		Old Dominion; MAC–SBC Challenge	W 60–46	1–0	13 – Becki	11 – Kiefer	3 – Becki	Worthen Arena (1,713); Muncie, IN
November 8, 2024*; 7:00 p.m., ESPN+		IU Indy	W 89–63	2–0	21 – Becki	6 – 2 tied	9 – Becki	Worthen Arena (4,018); Muncie, IN
November 13, 2024*; 6:30 p.m., ESPN+		Memphis	W 95–66	3–0	22 – Becki	10 – Becki	10 – Becki	Worthen Arena (1,809); Muncie, IN
November 16, 2024*; 3:00 p.m., ESPN+		at Northern Iowa	W 76–70	4–0	18 – 2 tied	9 – 2 tied	3 – 3 tied	McLeod Center (2,338); Cedar Falls, IA
November 23, 2024*; 6:30 p.m., FloHoops		vs. No. 16 North Carolina; Battle 4 Atlantis quarterfinals	L 52–63	4–1	19 – Bischoff	7 – 2 tied	7 – Becki	Imperial Arena (572); Paradise Island, Bahamas
November 24, 2024*; 9:00 p.m., FloHoops		vs. Texas A&M; Battle 4 Atlantis consolation 2nd round	W 75–62	5–1	17 – 2 tied	6 – Becki	9 – Becki	Imperial Arena; Paradise Island, Bahamas
November 25, 2024*; 5:00 p.m., FloHoops		vs. Columbia; Battle 4 Atlantis 5th-place game	L 62–69	5–2	15 – Austin	7 – 2 tied	6 – Becki	Imperial Arena (131); Paradise Island, Bahamas
December 1, 2024*; 1:00 p.m., ESPN+		South Dakota State	L 55–63	5–3	19 – Kiefer	8 – Kiefer	2 – Johnson	Worthen Arena (1,200); Muncie, IN
December 5, 2024*; 11:00 a.m., ESPN+		Davidson	W 80–61	6–3	20 – Becki	6 – Austin	5 – Becki	Worthen Arena (5,049); Muncie, IN
December 10, 2024*; 6:00 p.m., B1G+		at No. 11 Ohio State	L 48–80	6–4	10 – Johnson	7 – 2 tied	4 – Becki	Value City Arena (4,977); Columbus, OH
December 15, 2024*; 3:30 p.m., ESPN+		at Northern Kentucky	W 77–51	7–4	23 – Kingery	9 – Kiefer	6 – 2 tied	Truist Arena (2,124); Highland Heights, KY
December 19, 2024*; 6:30 p.m., ESPN+		Anderson	W 112–35	8–4	16 – Stuck	9 – H. Smith	7 – Becki	Worthen Arena (1,565); Muncie, IN
MAC regular season
January 1, 2025; 1:00 p.m., ESPN+		at Miami (OH)	W 68–55	9–4 (1–0)	22 – Becki	10 – Stuck	7 – Becki	Millett Hall (537); Oxford, OH
January 4, 2025; 1:00 p.m., ESPN+		Central Michigan	W 72–61	10–4 (2–0)	20 – Becki	8 – Becki	5 – Becki	Worthen Arena (1,704); Muncie, IN
January 8, 2025; 6:30 p.m., ESPN+		Eastern Michigan	W 101–69	11–4 (3–0)	21 – Richard	10 – 2 tied	11 – Austin	Worthen Arena (2,145); Muncie, IN
January 11, 2025; 2:30 p.m., ESPN+		at Buffalo	W 78–56	12–4 (4–0)	20 – Stuck	15 – Stuck	5 – 2 tied	Alumni Arena (1,242); Amherst, NY
January 15, 2025; 7:00 p.m., ESPN+		at Kent State	W 66–57	13–4 (5–0)	17 – Austin	9 – 2 tied	6 – Becki	MAC Center (1,157); Kent, OH
January 18, 2025; 11:30 a.m., ESPN+		Akron	W 80–57	14–4 (6–0)	18 – Bischoff	6 – Kiefer	6 – Becki	Worthen Arena; Muncie, IN
January 20, 2025; 11:00 a.m., CBSSN		Toledo	W 77–63	15–4 (7–0)	26 – Becki	8 – Richard	9 – Becki	Worthen Arena (1,810); Muncie, IN
January 25, 2025; 2:00 p.m., ESPN+		at Northern Illinois	W 81–62	16–4 (8–0)	20 – Becki	10 – Richard	5 – Becki	Convocation Center; DeKalb, IL
January 29, 2025; 7:00 p.m., ESPN+		at Ohio	W 83–61	17–4 (9–0)	23 – Becki	16 – Kiefer	12 – Becki	Convocation Center (980); Athens, OH
February 1, 2025; 1:00 p.m., ESPN+		Western Michigan	W 61–51	18–4 (10–0)	23 – Richard	9 – Richard	4 – Austin	Worthen Arena (2,025); Muncie, IN
February 5, 2025; 6:30 p.m., ESPN+		Bowling Green	W 71–51	19–4 (11–0)	20 – Bischoff	11 – Richard	10 – Becki	Worthen Arena (2,102); Muncie, IN
February 8, 2025*; 2:00 p.m., ESPN+		at James Madison; MAC–SBC Challenge	L 74–78	19–5	22 – Richard	9 – Richard	10 – Austin	Atlantic Union Bank Center (2,970); Harrisonburg, VA
February 15, 2025; 1:00 p.m., ESPN+		at Eastern Michigan	W 74–69	20–5 (12–0)	20 – Becki	11 – Kiefer	5 – 2 tied	George Gervin GameAbove Center (1,408); Ypsilanti, MI
February 19, 2025; 7:00 p.m., ESPN+		at Toledo	L 66–70	20–6 (12–1)	33 – Richard	8 – Becki	8 – Becki	Savage Arena (4,158); Toledo, OH
February 22, 2025; 12:00 p.m., ESPNU/ESPN+		Kent State	L 54–60	20–7 (12–2)	15 – Becki	9 – Richard	4 – Becki	Worthen Arena; Muncie, IN
February 26, 2025; 6:30 p.m., ESPN+		at Central Michigan	W 60–58 ^{OT}	21–7 (13–2)	17 – Austin	16 – Kiefer	5 – Becki	McGuirk Arena (1,050); Mount Pleasant, MI
March 1, 2025; 1:00 p.m., ESPN+		at Western Michigan	W 55–45	22–7 (14–2)	29 – Richard	13 – Kiefer	5 – Becki	University Arena (720); Kalamazoo, MI
March 5, 2025; 6:30 p.m., ESPN+		Buffalo	W 72–60	23–7 (15–2)	20 – Richard	13 – Kiefer	9 – Becki	Worthen Arena (1,755); Muncie, IN
March 8, 2025; 1:00 p.m., ESPN+		Ohio	W 82–57	24–7 (16–2)	25 – Richard	10 – Richard	10 – Becki	Worthen Arena; Muncie, IN
MAC tournament
March 12, 2025; 11:00 a.m., ESPN+	(1)	vs. (8) Western Michigan; Quarterfinals	W 82–53	25–7	17 – Richard	13 – Kiefer	8 – Becki	Rocket Arena; Cleveland, OH
March 14, 2025; 10:00 a.m., ESPN+	(1)	vs. (4) Kent State; Semifinals	W 70–53	26–7	21 – Austin	9 – Becki	7 – Becki	Rocket Arena; Cleveland, OH
March 15, 2025; 11:00 a.m., CBSSN	(1)	vs. (2) Toledo; Championship	W 65–58	27–7	28 – Richard	9 – Richard	5 – Becki	Rocket Arena; Cleveland, OH
NCAA tournament – Spokane Regional 1
March 21, 2025; 6:00 p.m., ESPNU	(12 S1)	vs. (5 S1) No. 25 Ole Miss; Round of 64	L 65–83	27–8	19 – Becki	8 – Austin	2 – Becki	Foster Pavilion (4,416); Waco, TX
*Non-conference game. ^{#}Rankings from AP poll. (#) Tournament seedings in parentheses. All times are in Eastern.
