= 2024–25 NCAA Division I women's basketball season =

American college basketball season

- Preseason AP No. 1: South Carolina Gamecocks
- Regular season: November 4, 2024 – March 16, 2025
- NCAA Tournament: 2025
- Tournament dates: March 19 – April 6, 2025
- National Championship: Amalie Arena; Tampa, Florida
- NCAA Champions: UConn Huskies
- Other champions: Minnesota Golden Gophers (WBIT); Buffalo Bulls (WNIT)
- Player of the Year (Naismith, Wooden): JuJu Watkins, USC Trojans

The 2024–25 NCAA Division I women's basketball season began on November 4, 2024. The regular season ended on March 16, 2025, with the 2025 NCAA Division I women's basketball tournament beginning with the First Four on March 19 and ending with the championship game at Amalie Arena in Tampa, Florida on April 6.

== Rule changes ==
On May 2, 2024, the NCAA Basketball Rules Committee proposed a few rule changes for the 2024–25 season. These changes were approved on June 6 by the Playing Rules Oversight Panel.

- A one-game suspension has been added to the ejection of any player, coach, or bench personnel who "disrespectfully contacts an official or makes a threat of physical intimidation or harm, to include pushing, shoving, spitting or attempting to make physical contact with an official".
- Officials will be able to review whether a player's foot last touching the court was inbounds on a made shot before time expired. If a player's foot is determined to be out of bounds, officials would put the exact time of the violation on the game clock. However, if the shot is made and time remains on the game clock, a video review would not occur.
- Officials will now immediately conduct a replay review to judge whether a basket should count or not if an off-ball foul is called near the time a field goal or free-throw attempt is occurring. Previously, these reviews were conducted during the next electronic-media timeout.

== Season headlines ==
- May 29, 2024 – Stephen F. Austin announced that it would leave the Western Athletic Conference on July 1 to rejoin the Southland Conference after a three-year absence.
- July 1 – IUPUI's athletic teams renamed to Indiana University Indianapolis (IU Indy) after the Indiana and Purdue university systems split the university into IU Indianapolis and Purdue University in Indianapolis.
- September 12 – The Pac-12 Conference, which had been reduced to 2 members after its remaining 10 schools left for other power conferences a month earlier, began a rebuilding process by announcing that Mountain West Conference members Boise State, Colorado State, Fresno State, and San Diego State would join the Pac-12 in 2026–27.
- September 24 – The Pac-12 Conference's rebuilding continued as Utah State would join the other Mountain West defectors in 2026–27.
- September 30 – Gonzaga announced it would leave the West Coast Conference to join the Pac-12 Conference for all sports except for football in 2026–27.
- October 1 – UTEP announced it would join the Mountain West from Conference USA in 2026–27.
- October 9:
  - The NCAA Division I Council approved a proposal that reduced the duration of the transfer portal to 30 days. Going forward, the window opens on the day after the completion of the second round of the Division I women's tournament.
  - The council also abolished the National Letter of Intent program effective immediately. Written offers of athletics aid replaced the NLI.
  - The council introduced a proposal that would shorten the transition periods for schools wishing to reclassify from Division II or Division III to Division I. Following eventual approval at the council's January 2025 meeting, the transition periods for Division II and III schools has now dropped by a year, respectively to three and four years.
- October 15 – The Mountain West announced that Hawaiʻi, which has been a football-only member of that conference since 2012, would leave the Big West Conference in 2026–27 to become a full MW member.
- November 1 – The Mountain West announced that Grand Canyon would join the conference no later than 2026–27 for all sports except for football. Grand Canyon's official announcement stated that it would not compete in the West Coast Conference, which it had previously been scheduled to join in July 2025, and that if Mountain West bylaws allowed, it would join that conference in 2025.
- November 7 – The Texas A&M University System Board of Regents approved the name change of the former Texas A&M University–Commerce to East Texas A&M University.
- December 10 – The Mountain West announced that UC Davis would join the conference for all sports except football in 2026–27.
- January 15, 2025 – The Division I Council adopted new criteria for divisional reclassification. Schools moving from Division II or III must meet objective measures of academic success and athletic financial aid. Reclassification periods are now three years for moves from Division II and four years for moves from Division III, contingent on schools meeting these new criteria.
- February 27 – The Horizon League announced that Northern Illinois would join the conference in 2026–27, coinciding with the football team's departure from the Mid-American Conference to the Mountain West.
- March 19 – Cal Baptist announced it would join the Big West from the Western Athletic Conference in 2026–27.
- March 25 – Saint Francis announced that it would reclassify to NCAA Division III starting in 2026–27, when it will leave the Northeast Conference for the Presidents' Athletic Conference.

=== Milestones and records ===
- November 15 – UConn head coach Geno Auriemma drew even with recently retired Stanford coach Tara VanDerveer as the winningest head coach in NCAA basketball history across all divisions, earning his 1,216th win after the Huskies' 69–58 win over North Carolina.
- November 20 – Auriemma took sole possession of the career wins record after UConn's 85–41 win over Fairleigh Dickinson.
- December 14 – Tennessee defeated North Carolina Central, 139–59, and broke multiple school and NCAA records in the process. These include largest margin of victory in program history (80), and most three-point field goals made in Division I history (30).
- February 16 – Vanderbilt freshman guard Mikayla Blakes broke the record for most points scored in a single game by a freshman in NCAA basketball history across all divisions, after she scored 55 points to help the Commodores to a 98–88 overtime road win over Auburn.
- March 16 – In the Missouri Valley Conference tournament final, Murray State's Katelyn Young became the 17th woman with 3,000 career points in Division I play, scoring 34 points in the Racers' 83–62 win over Belmont.

== Conference membership changes ==
A total of 23 schools joined new conferences for the 2024–25 season. Of these, 20 moved within Division I, two began reclassification from NCAA Division II, and Chicago State ended its two-year stint as an all-sports independent to join the Northeast Conference.

School	Former conference	New Conference
Arizona	Pac-12	Big 12
Arizona State	Pac-12	Big 12
California	Pac-12	ACC
Chicago State	Independent	NEC
Colorado	Pac-12	Big 12
Kennesaw State	ASUN	CUSA
Mercyhurst	PSAC (D-II)	NEC
Merrimack	NEC	MAAC
Oklahoma	Big 12	SEC
Oregon	Pac-12	Big Ten
Oregon State	Pac-12	WCC
Sacred Heart	NEC	MAAC
SMU	American	ACC
Stanford	Pac-12	ACC
Stephen F. Austin	WAC	Southland
Texas	Big 12	SEC
UCLA	Pac-12	Big Ten
USC	Pac-12	Big Ten
Utah	Pac-12	Big 12
UTRGV	WAC	Southland
Washington	Pac-12	Big Ten
Washington State	Pac-12	WCC
West Georgia	Gulf South (D–II)	ASUN

The 2024–25 season was the last for five Division I schools in their respective conferences, and was also the last for one Division II school before starting a transition to Division I.

School	2024–25 conference	Future conference
Delaware	CAA	CUSA
Grand Canyon	WAC	MW
Missouri State	Missouri Valley	CUSA
New Haven	Northeast-10 (D–II)	Northeast
Seattle	WAC	WCC
UMass	A-10	MAC

== Arenas ==
=== New arenas ===
- Georgia Southern left the Hanner Fieldhouse after 55 seasons there for the new Hill Convocation Center. The team played its first game in the Hill Convocation Center on December 5, 2024.
- St. Thomas will play their final season at Schoenecker Arena, where they have played since 1981, before moving to the new Lee and Penny Anderson Arena, which will open in the 2025–26 season.
- Tarleton State will play their final season at Wisdom Gym, where they have played since 1970, before moving to the new EECU Center, which will open in the 2025–26 season.
- Vermont was originally slated to open their new arena, Tarrant Event Center, as a replacement for the current arena, Patrick Gym. Construction was to continue in 2021 but it has been delayed indefinitely.

=== Arena of new D-I teams ===
- West Georgia will transition from Division II to Division I and play at The Coliseum in Carrollton, Georgia, where it has played since 2009. It will be ineligible for NCAA-organized postseason play (i.e., the NCAA tournament or NIT) until 2028.
- Mercyhurst will transition from Division II to Division I and play on the Owen McCormick Court in the Mercyhurst Athletic Center in Erie, Pennsylvania, where it has played since 1977. It will be ineligible for NCAA-organized postseason play until 2028.

=== Other arena changes ===
- Bellarmine announced on August 28, 2024, that home games would return to campus at Knights Hall for the first time since 2019–20. The Knights had played in the interim at Freedom Hall on the grounds of the Kentucky Exposition Center.

== Seasonal outlook ==
The Top 25 from the AP and USA Today Coaching polls.

=== Pre-season polls ===
AP
Ranking	Team
1	South Carolina (27)
2	UConn (2)
3	USC (1)
4	Texas
5	UCLA
6	Notre Dame
7	LSU
8	Iowa State
9	NC State
10	Oklahoma
11	Duke
12	Baylor
13	Kansas State
14	Ohio State
15	North Carolina
16	West Virginia
17	Louisville
18	Maryland
19	Florida State
20	Ole Miss
21	Creighton
22	Kentucky
23	Nebraska
24	Alabama
25	Indiana

USA Today Coaches
Ranking	Team
1	South Carolina (27)
2	UConn (3)
3	USC (1)
4	Texas
5	Notre Dame
6	UCLA
7	LSU
8	NC State
9	Iowa State
10	Oklahoma
11	Duke
12	Baylor
13	Kansas State
14	Ohio State
15	West Virginia
16	North Carolina
17	Louisville
18	Maryland
19	Florida State
20	Creighton
21	Ole Miss
22	Kentucky
23	Nebraska
24	Alabama
25	Indiana

=== Final polls ===
AP
Ranking	Team
1	UConn (31)
2	South Carolina
3	UCLA
4	Texas
5	USC
6	TCU
7	Duke
8	LSU
9	NC State
10	Notre Dame
11	Oklahoma
12	Maryland
13	Kansas State
14	North Carolina
15	Tennessee
16	Kentucky
17	Ole Miss
18	Baylor
19	Ohio State
20	Alabama
21	West Virginia
22	Florida State
23	South Dakota State
24	Oklahoma State
25	Michigan

USA Today Coaches
Ranking	Team
1	UConn (31)
2	South Carolina
3	UCLA
4	Texas
5	USC
6	TCU
7	Duke
8	LSU
9	Notre Dame
10	NC State
11	Oklahoma
12	North Carolina
13	Kentucky
14	Maryland
15	Kansas State
16	Tennessee
17	Ohio State
18	Baylor
19	West Virginia
20	Ole Miss
21	Alabama
22	Oklahoma State
23	South Dakota State
24	Florida State
25	Creighton

== Top 10 matchups ==
Rankings reflect the AP poll Top 25.

=== Regular season ===
- Nov. 10, 2024
  - No. 1 South Carolina defeated No. 9 NC State, 71–57 (Ally Tipoff – Spectrum Center, Charlotte, NC)
- Nov. 23
  - No. 6 Notre Dame defeated No. 3 USC, 74–61 (Galen Center, Los Angeles, CA)
- Nov. 24
  - No. 5 UCLA defeated No. 1 South Carolina, 77–62 (Pauley Pavilion, Los Angeles, CA)
- Dec. 5
  - No. 10 Notre Dame defeated No. 4 Texas, 80–70^{OT} (ACC–SEC Challenge – Joyce Center, Notre Dame, IN)
  - No. 3 South Carolina defeated No. 8 Duke, 81–70 (ACC–SEC Challenge – Colonial Life Arena, Columbia, SC)
- Dec. 8
  - No. 3 South Carolina defeated No. 9 TCU, 85–53 (Coast-to-Coast Challenge – Dickies Arena, Fort Worth, TX)
- Dec. 12
  - No. 8 Notre Dame defeated No. 2 UConn, 79–68 (Rivalry – Joyce Center, Notre Dame, IN)
- Dec. 21
  - No. 7 USC defeated No. 4 UConn, 72–70 (XL Center, Hartford, CT)
- Jan. 2, 2025
  - No. 5 Texas defeated No. 9 Oklahoma, 80–73 (Lloyd Noble Center, Norman, OK)
- Jan. 8
  - No. 4 USC defeated No. 8 Maryland, 79–74 (Xfinity Center, College Park, MD)
- Jan. 12
  - No. 2 South Carolina defeated No. 5 Texas, 67–50 (Colonial Life Arena, Columbia, SC)
- Jan. 20
  - No. 7 Texas defeated No. 8 Maryland, 89–51 (Coretta Scott King Classic – Prudential Center, Newark, NJ)
- Jan. 24
  - No. 2 South Carolina defeated No. 5 LSU, 66–56 (Colonial Life Arena, Columbia, SC)
- Jan. 26
  - No. 1 UCLA defeated No. 8 Maryland, 82–67 (Xfinity Center, College Park, MD)
- Feb. 5
  - No. 1 UCLA defeated No. 8 Ohio State, 65–52 (Pauley Pavilion, Los Angeles, CA)
- Feb. 8
  - No. 7 USC defeated No. 8 Ohio State, 84–63 (Galen Center, Los Angeles, CA)
- Feb. 9
  - No. 4 Texas defeated No. 2 South Carolina, 66–62 (Moody Center, Austin, TX)
- Feb. 13
  - No. 3 Texas defeated No. 8 Kentucky, 67–49 (Memorial Coliseum, Lexington, KY)
  - No. 6 USC defeated No. 1 UCLA, 71–60 (Rivalry – Galen Center, Los Angeles, CA)
- Feb. 16
  - No. 7 UConn defeated No. 4 South Carolina, 87–58 (Colonial Life Arena, Columbia, SC)
  - No. 3 Texas defeated No. 5 LSU, 65–58 (Moody Center, Austin, TX)
- Mar. 1
  - No. 4 USC defeated No. 2 UCLA, 80–67 (Rivalry – Pauley Pavilion, Los Angeles, CA)
- Mar. 8
  - No. 5 South Carolina defeated No. 10 Oklahoma, 93–75 (SEC tournament — Bon Secours Wellness Arena, Greenville, SC)
  - No. 1 Texas defeated No. 9 LSU, 56–49 (SEC tournament — Bon Secours Wellness Arena, Greenville, SC)
- Mar. 9
  - No. 5 South Carolina defeated No. 1 Texas, 64–45 (SEC Tournament — Bon Secours Wellness Arena, Greenville, SC)
  - No. 4 UCLA defeated No. 2 USC, 72–67 (Big Ten Tournament - Gainbridge Fieldhouse, Indianapolis, IN)

=== Postseason ===
- Mar. 28
  - No. 10 LSU defeated No. 9 NC State, 80–73 (Sweet Sixteen – Spokane Arena, Spokane, WA)
- Mar. 29
  - No. 6 TCU defeated No. 8 Notre Dame, 71–62 (Sweet Sixteen – Legacy Arena, Birmingham, AL)
- Mar. 30
  - No. 2 South Carolina defeated No. 7 Duke, 54–50 (Elite Eight – Legacy Arena, Birmingham, AL)
  - No. 1 UCLA defeated No. 10 LSU, 72–65 (Elite Eight – Spokane Arena, Spokane, WA)
- Mar. 31
  - No. 5 Texas defeated No. 6 TCU, 58–47 (Elite Eight – Legacy Arena, Birmingham, AL)
  - No. 3 UConn defeated No. 4 USC, 78–64 (Elite Eight – Spokane Arena, Spokane, WA)
- Apr. 4
  - No. 2 South Carolina defeated No. 5 Texas, 74–54 (Final Four – Amalie Arena, Tampa, FL)
  - No. 3 UConn defeated No. 1 UCLA, 85–51 (Final Four – Amalie Arena, Tampa, FL)
- Apr. 6
  - No. 3 UConn defeated No. 2 South Carolina, 82–59 (National Championship Game – Amalie Arena, Tampa, FL)

== Regular season ==
=== Early-season tournaments ===
Tournament/event name	Dates	Location	No. Teams	Champions	Notes
Great Alaska Shootout	November 22–23, 2024	Alaska Airlines Center (Anchorage, AK)	4	Troy	
Battle 4 Atlantis	November 23–25, 2024	Imperial Arena (Paradise Island, Bahamas)	8	North Carolina	
Emerald Coast Classic	November 25–26, 2024	Imperial Arena (Rider Arena, Niceville, FL)	8	Alabama (Bay); Creighton (Beach)	
Baha Mar Women's Championship	November 25–27, 2024	Baha Mar Convention Center (Nassau, Bahamas)	4	UConn	
Baha Mar Hoops Pink Flamingo Championship	November 25–27, 2024	Baha Mar Convention Center (Nassau, Bahamas)	4	LSU	
Ball Dawgs Classic	November 25–27, 2024	Lee's Family Forum (Henderson, NV)	4	Duke	
Acrisure Holiday Invitational	November 26–27, 2024	Acrisure Arena (Palm Desert, CA)	4	Michigan State	
Colgate Thanksgiving Tournament	November 29–30, 2024	Cotterell Court (Hamilton, NY)	4	Colgate	
Fort Myers Tip-Off Shell Division	November 29–30, 2024	Suncoast Credit Union Arena (Fort Myers, FL)	4	Michigan	
FIU Tournament	November 29–December 1, 2024	Ocean Bank Convocation Center (University Park, FL)	4	Abilene Christian	
Gulf Coast Showcase	November 29–December 1, 2024	Hertz Arena (Estero, FL)	8	Texas	
Miami Thanksgiving Tournament	November 29–December 1, 2024	Watsco Center (Coral Gables, FL)	4	Miami (FL)	
Lehigh Christmas City Classic	November 30–December 1, 2024	Stabler Arena (Bethlehem, PA)	4	Lehigh	
Cherokee Invitational	December 18–19, 2024	Harrah's Cherokee (Cherokee, NC)	4	Toledo	
Tulane Holiday Tournament	December 20–21, 2024	Devlin Fieldhouse (New Orleans, LA)	4	Tulane	
Hawk Classic	December 20–21, 2024	Hagan Arena (Philadelphia, PA)	4	Saint Joseph's	
Raising the B.A.R. Invitational	December 21–22, 2024	Haas Pavilion (Berkeley, CA)	4	California	

=== Head-to-head conference challenges ===
Conference Match Up	Dates	Conference Winner	Conference Loser	Record
ACC–SEC Challenge	December 4−5	SEC	ACC	**10–6**
Big Sky–Summit Challenge	December 4−7	Summit	Big Sky	**10–7**
Conference USA–WAC Challenge	November 4−December 17	CUSA	WAC	**11–7**
MAC–SBC Challenge	November 4−February 8	MAC	SBC	**15–9**

=== Upsets ===
An upset is a victory by an underdog team. In the context of NCAA Division I women's basketball, this generally constitutes an unranked team defeating a team currently ranked in the top 25. This list will highlight those upsets of ranked teams by unranked teams as well as upsets of No. 1 teams. Rankings are from the AP poll. Bold type indicates winning teams in "true road games"—i.e., those played on an opponent's home court (including secondary homes). Italics type indicates winning teams in an early-season tournament (or event). Early-season tournaments are tournaments played in the early season. Events are the tournaments with the same teams in it every year (even rivalry games).

Winner	Score	Loser	Date	Tournament/Event	Notes
Illinois	83–74	No. 13 Florida State	November 7, 2024		
**Harvard**	72–68^{OT}	No. 25 Indiana	November 7, 2024		
South Dakota State	83–74	No. 21 Creighton	November 8, 2024		
Oregon	76–74	No. 12 Baylor	November 10, 2024		
Indiana	79–66	No. 24 Stanford	November 17, 2024		
TCU	76–73	No. 13 NC State	November 17, 2024		
Northern Iowa	87–75	No. 8 Iowa State	November 20, 2024		Northern Iowa's first-ever win over a top-10 opponent
Creighton	80–74	No. 21 Nebraska	November 20, 2024	Rivalry	
Indiana	73–65	No. 18 Baylor	November 24, 2024	Battle 4 Atlantis	
No. 5 UCLA	77–62	No. 1 South Carolina	November 24, 2024		South Carolina's 43-game winning streak snapped
Georgia Tech	74–58	No. 21 Oregon	November 25, 2024	Hawaii North Shore Showcase	Game played in Lāʻie, Hawaii
South Dakota State	75–70	No. 21 Oregon	November 26, 2024	Hawaii North Shore Showcase	Game played in Lāʻie, Hawaii
Utah	78–67	No. 3 Notre Dame	November 30, 2024	Cayman Islands Classic	
NC State	68–61	No. 18 Ole Miss	December 5, 2024	ACC–SEC Challenge	
California	69–65	No. 19 Alabama	December 5, 2024	ACC–SEC Challenge	
Tennessee	78–68	No. 17 Iowa	December 7, 2024	Women's Champions Classic	Game played in Brooklyn, New York
Alabama	82–67	No. 15 Michigan State	December 20, 2024	West Palm Beach Classic	Game played in Fort Lauderdale, Florida
South Florida	65–56	No. 9 Duke	December 21, 2024		
Colorado	65–60	No. 14 West Virginia	December 21, 2024		
Clemson	69–58	No. 20 California	January 2, 2025		
Texas A&M	60–58	No. 25 Ole Miss	January 5, 2025		
Nebraska	85–80	No. 20 Michigan State	January 8, 2025		
Mississippi State	81–77	No. 10 Oklahoma	January 9, 2025		
Illinois	62–57	No. 23 Iowa	January 9, 2025		
**Virginia Tech**	105–94^{2OT}	No. 13 Georgia Tech	January 9, 2025		
Oklahoma State	64–57	No. 17 West Virginia	January 11, 2025		
**Indiana**	74–67	No. 23 Iowa	January 12, 2025		
Louisville	69–60	No. 13 Georgia Tech	January 12, 2025		
Baylor	70–61	No. 23 Utah	January 14, 2025		
Houston	79–76	No. 24 Oklahoma State	January 14, 2025		
Penn State	62–59	No. 9 Ohio State	January 19, 2025		
Vanderbilt	71–70	No. 15 Tennessee	January 19, 2025	Rivalry	
Oklahoma State	60–59	No. 9 TCU	January 22, 2025		
Texas A&M	61–55	No. 11 Kentucky	January 23, 2025		
Colorado	63–53	No. 10 Kansas State	January 25, 2025		
Arizona	77–62	No. 16 West Virginia	January 25, 2025		
**Florida State**	86–84	No. 13 North Carolina	January 26, 2025		
**Vanderbilt**	66–64	No. 19 Alabama	January 26, 2025		
**Oregon**	63–59	No. 16 Michigan State	January 30, 2025		
**Illinois**	66–65	No. 14 Maryland	February 2, 2025		
Iowa	76–69	No. 4 USC	February 2, 2025		
**Ole Miss**	76–61	No. 23 Vanderbilt	February 2, 2025		
Louisville	70–63	No. 21 California	February 6, 2025		
**Michigan**	71–61	No. 20 Michigan State	February 9, 2025	Rivalry	
Ole Miss	66–57	No. 8 Kentucky	February 10, 2025		
**Louisville**	83–69	No. 23 Florida State	February 13, 2025		
**Nebraska**	91–71	No. 17 Maryland	February 13, 2025		
Clemson	68–61	No. 19 Georgia Tech	February 13, 2025		
No. 6 USC	71–60	No. 1 UCLA	February 13, 2025	Rivalry	
BYU	68–64	No. 20 Oklahoma State	February 15, 2025		
Indiana	71–61	No. 8 Ohio State	February 20, 2025		
**Louisville**	70–62	No. 11 Duke	February 20, 2025		
No. 13 NC State	104–95	No. 1 Notre Dame	February 23, 2025		
**Florida State**	73–70	No. 20 Georgia Tech	February 23, 2025		
**Georgia**	72–69	No. 11 Tennessee	March 2, 2025		
**Virginia**	78–75	No. 8 North Carolina	March 2, 2025		
**Ole Miss**	85–77	No. 7 LSU	March 2, 2025		
Iowa State	85–63	No. 14 Kansas State	March 2, 2025		
Vanderbilt	84–76	No. 18 Tennessee	March 6, 2025	Rivalry/SEC tournament	
Florida	63–61	No. 19 Alabama	March 6, 2025	SEC tournament	
Iowa	74–61	No. 24 Michigan State	March 6, 2025	Big Ten tournament	
Michigan	98–71	No. 15 Maryland	March 7, 2025	Big Ten tournament	

In addition to the above listed upsets in which an unranked team defeated a ranked team, there have been five non-Division I teams to defeat a Division I team so far this season. Bold type indicates winning teams in "true road games"—i.e., those played on an opponent's home court (including secondary homes).

Winner	Score	Loser	Date	Tournament/event	Notes
**Bethel (TN)** (NAIA)	64–52	Austin Peay	November 4, 2024		Back-to-back season opening losses against non-Division I teams
**UMSL** (Division II)	60–52	SIU Edwardsville	November 4, 2024		
**Adelphi** (Division II)	58–50	Fordham	November 4, 2024		
**Colorado Christian** (Division II)	58–50	Denver	November 4, 2024		
Alaska Anchorage (Division II)	68–52	Vermont	November 23, 2024	Great Alaska Shootout third place game	
**Findlay** (Division II)	65–64	Wright State	November 26, 2024		

=== Conference winners and tournaments ===
Each of the 31 active Division I athletic conferences ended its regular season with a single-elimination tournament. The team with the best regular-season record in each conference receives the number one seed in each tournament, with tiebreakers used as needed in the case of ties for the top seeding. Unless otherwise noted, the winners of these tournaments will receive automatic invitations to the 2025 NCAA Division I women's basketball tournament.

Conference	Regular- season first place	Conference player of the year	Conference Coach of the year	Conference tournament	Tournament venue (city)	Tournament winner
America East Conference	Albany	Kayla Cooper, Albany	Colleen Mullen, Albany	2025 America East women's basketball tournament	Campus sites	Vermont
American Athletic Conference	UTSA	Jordyn Jenkins, UTSA	Karen Aston, UTSA	2025 American Athletic Conference women's basketball tournament	Dickies Arena (Fort Worth, TX)	South Florida
Atlantic Sun Conference	Florida Gulf Coast	Emani Jefferson, FGCU	Chelsea Lyles, FGCU	2025 Atlantic Sun women's basketball tournament	Campus sites	Florida Gulf Coast
Atlantic 10 Conference	Richmond	Maggie Doogan, Richmond	Aaron Roussell, Richmond	2025 Atlantic 10 women's basketball tournament	Henrico Sports & Events Center (Henrico, VA)	George Mason
Atlantic Coast Conference	NC State (Note: Top seed in conference tournament.) & Notre Dame	Hannah Hidalgo, Notre Dame	Wes Moore, NC State	2025 ACC women's basketball tournament	First Horizon Coliseum (Greensboro, NC)	Duke
Big 12 Conference	TCU	Hailey Van Lith, TCU	Mark Campbell, TCU	2025 Big 12 Conference women's basketball tournament	T-Mobile Center (Kansas City, MO)	TCU
Big East Conference	UConn	Paige Bueckers, UConn	Geno Auriemma, UConn & Cara Consuegra, Marquette	2025 Big East Conference women's basketball tournament	Mohegan Sun Arena (Uncasville, CT)	UConn
Big Sky Conference	Montana State	Esmeralda Morales, Montana State	Tricia Binford, Montana State	2025 Big Sky Conference women's basketball tournament	Idaho Central Arena (Boise, ID)	Montana State
Big South Conference	High Point	Ashley Hawkins, Gardner–Webb	Erika Lang-Montgomery, Longwood	2025 Big South Conference women's basketball tournament	Freedom Hall Civic Center (Johnson City, TN)	High Point
Big Ten Conference	USC	JuJu Watkins, USC	Lindsay Gottlieb, USC	2025 Big Ten women's basketball tournament	Gainbridge Fieldhouse (Indianapolis, IN)	UCLA
Big West Conference	Hawai'i	Lily Wahinekapu, Hawaiʻi	Laura Beeman, Hawaiʻi	2025 Big West Conference women's basketball tournament	Lee's Family Forum (Henderson, NV)	UC San Diego
Coastal Athletic Association	North Carolina A&T	Taryn Barbot, Charleston	Tarrell Robinson, North Carolina A&T	2025 Coastal Athletic Association women's basketball tournament	CareFirst Arena (Washington, DC)	William & Mary
Conference USA	Liberty & Middle Tennessee	Molly Kaiser, New Mexico State	Rick Insell, Middle Tennessee	2025 Conference USA women's basketball tournament	Propst Arena (Huntsville, AL)	Liberty
Horizon League	Green Bay	Mickayla Perdue, Cleveland State	Maria Marchesano, Purdue Fort Wayne	2025 Horizon League women's basketball tournament	Quarterfinals: Campus sites Semifinals and final: Corteva Coliseum (Indianapolis, IN)	Green Bay
Ivy League	Columbia	Harmoni Turner, Harvard	Columbia (head coach: Megan Griffith) (Note: The Ivy League presents its top coaching honor to an entire staff instead of the head coach, although that coach is specifically named in the award announcement.)	2025 Ivy League women's basketball tournament	Pizzitola Sports Center (Providence, RI)	Harvard
Metro Atlantic Athletic Conference	Fairfield	Gal Raviv, Quinnipiac	Tricia Fabbri, Quinnipiac	2025 MAAC women's basketball tournament	Boardwalk Hall (Atlantic City, NJ)	Fairfield
Mid-American Conference	Ball State	Ally Becki, Ball State	Brady Sallee, Ball State	2025 Mid-American Conference women's basketball tournament	Rocket Arena (Cleveland, OH)	Ball State
Mid-Eastern Athletic Conference	Norfolk State	Diamond Johnson, Norfolk State	Larry Vickers, Norfolk State	2025 MEAC women's basketball tournament	Norfolk Scope (Norfolk, VA)	Norfolk State
Missouri Valley Conference	Missouri State & Murray State	Katie Dinnebier, Drake	Beth Cunningham, Missouri State	2025 Missouri Valley Conference women's basketball tournament	Ford Center (Evansville, IN)	Murray State
Mountain West Conference	UNLV	Allyson Fertig, Wyoming	Lindy La Rocque, UNLV	2025 Mountain West Conference women's basketball tournament	Thomas & Mack Center (Paradise, NV)	San Diego State
Northeast Conference	Fairleigh Dickinson	Belle Lanpher, Central Connecticut	Stephanie Gaitley, Fairleigh Dickinson	2025 Northeast Conference women's basketball tournament	Campus sites	Fairleigh Dickinson
Ohio Valley Conference	Tennessee Tech	Macy McGlone, Eastern Illinois	Amy Eagan, Lindenwood	2025 Ohio Valley Conference women's basketball tournament	Ford Center (Evansville, IN)	Tennessee Tech
Patriot League	Lehigh	Ashley Sofilkanich, Bucknell	Addie Micir, Lehigh	2025 Patriot League women's basketball tournament	Campus sites	Lehigh
Southeastern Conference	South Carolina & Texas	Madison Booker, Texas	Vic Schaefer, Texas	2025 Southeastern Conference women's basketball tournament	Bon Secours Wellness Arena (Greenville, SC)	South Carolina
Southern Conference	UNC Greensboro	Evangelia Paulk, Wofford	Trina Patterson, UNC Greensboro	2025 Southern Conference women's basketball tournament	Harrah's Cherokee Center (Asheville, NC)	UNC Greensboro
Southland Conference	Southeastern Louisiana	Alexius Horne, Southeastern Louisiana	Ayla Guzzardo, Southeastern Louisiana	2025 Southland Conference women's basketball tournament	The Legacy Center (Lake Charles, LA)	Stephen F. Austin
Southwestern Athletic Conference	Southern	Taleah Dilworth, Jackson State	Carlos Funchess, Southern	2025 SWAC women's basketball tournament	Bartow Arena (Birmingham, AL)	Southern
Summit League	South Dakota State	Grace Larkins, South Dakota	Aaron Johnston, South Dakota State	2025 Summit League women's basketball tournament	Denny Sanford Premier Center (Sioux Falls, SD)	South Dakota State
Sun Belt Conference	James Madison	Peyton McDaniel, James Madison	Sean O'Regan, James Madison	2025 Sun Belt Conference women's basketball tournament	Pensacola Bay Center (Pensacola, FL)	Arkansas State
West Coast Conference	Gonzaga & Portland	Yvonne Ejim, Gonzaga	Lisa Fortier, Gonzaga	2025 West Coast Conference women's basketball tournament	Orleans Arena (Paradise, NV)	Oregon State
Western Athletic Conference	Grand Canyon	Trinity San Antonio, Grand Canyon	Molly Miller, Grand Canyon	2025 WAC women's basketball tournament	Orleans Arena (Paradise, NV)	Grand Canyon

== Postseason tournaments ==
The NCAA Tournament tipped off on March 19, 2025, with the First Four, and will conclude on April 6 at Amalie Arena in Tampa, Florida. A Total of 68 teams entered the tournament. Thirty-one of the teams earned an automatic bids by winning their conferences tournaments. The remaining 37 teams are granted "at-large" bids, which are extended by the NCAA Selection Committee.

=== Final Four – Amalie Arena in Tampa, Florida ===
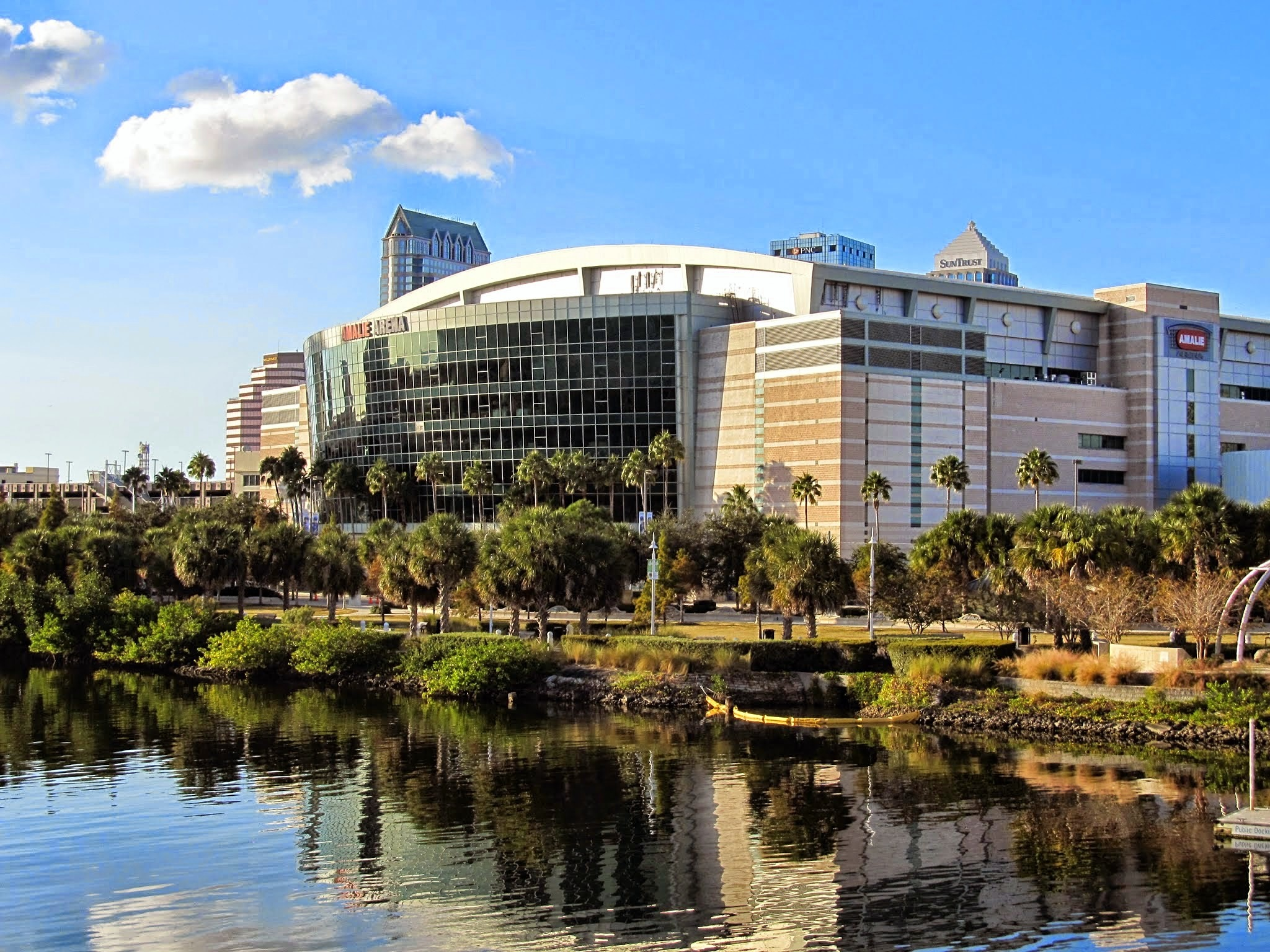
Amalie Arena in Tampa, Florida, hosted the NCAA women's Final Four.

National Semifinals; Final Four; Friday, April 4
S1 (1)	UCLA	51
S4 (2)	UConn	85
B2 (1)	South Carolina	74
B3 (1)	Texas	57

National Championship Game; Sunday, April 6
UConn	82
South Carolina	59

=== Tournament upsets ===
Per the NCAA, an upset occurs when the losing team in an NCAA tournament game was seeded at least two seed lines better than the winning team.

Date	Winner	Score	Loser	Region	Round
March 21	Oregon (10)	77–73 OT	Vanderbilt (7)	Birmingham (#2)	Round of 64
March 21	South Dakota State (10)	74–68	Oklahoma State (7)	Spokane (#4)	Round of 64

=== Women's Basketball Invitation Tournament ===
After the NCAA tournament field is announced, the NCAA invites 32 teams to the Women's Basketball Invitation Tournament. The teams determined by the NCAA tournament selection committee to be the "first four out" of the NCAA tournament receive the top four seeds in the WBIT. Also, teams that won regular-season conference titles but did not receive NCAA tournament invitations, if otherwise eligible for NCAA-sponsored postseason play, receive automatic bids. All WBIT games through the quarterfinals are held at campus sites, with the semifinals and finals taking place in Indianapolis at Hinkle Fieldhouse.

==== Semifinals and Finals ====
Semifinals; March 31; Hinkle Fieldhouse
3	Florida	52
2	Minnesota	66
3	Belmont	66
4	Villanova	57

Final; April 2 Hinkle Fieldhouse
2	Minnesota	75
3	Belmont	63

=== Women's National Invitation Tournament ===
After the NCAA tournament and WBIT fields are announced, the Women's National Invitation Tournament will invite 48 teams to participate. WNIT participants and sites will be announced when the field is set on March 17.

==== Semifinals and Finals ====
Semifinals; Fab 4 April 2
Troy	99
(H)	Illinois State	96
(H)	Buffalo	74
Cleveland State	69

Championship; April 5 CBSSN
Troy	84
(H)	Buffalo	88

== Conference standings ==
2024–25 America East Conference women's basketball standings
	Conf.				Overall
Team	W		L	PCT	W		L	PCT
Albany	14	–	2	.875	26	–	7	.788
Vermont †	13	–	3	.813	21	–	13	.618
Bryant	9	–	7	.563	17	–	15	.531
Maine	9	–	7	.563	15	–	16	.484
NJIT	8	–	8	.500	11	–	19	.367
Binghamton	7	–	9	.438	15	–	15	.500
UMBC	7	–	9	.438	14	–	15	.483
New Hampshire	4	–	12	.250	10	–	20	.333
UMass Lowell	1	–	15	.063	3	–	25	.107
† 2025 AmEast tournament winner

2024–25 American Athletic Conference women's basketball standings
	Conf.				Overall
Team	W		L	PCT	W		L	PCT
UTSA	17	–	1	.944	26	–	5	.839
North Texas	15	–	3	.833	25	–	9	.735
South Florida †	13	–	4	.765	23	–	11	.676
Temple	13	–	5	.722	20	–	11	.645
Tulsa	11	–	7	.611	17	–	15	.531
Tulane	9	–	8	.529	17	–	13	.567
East Carolina	8	–	10	.444	17	–	15	.531
UAB	7	–	11	.389	16	–	16	.500
Rice	7	–	11	.389	17	–	17	.500
Memphis	5	–	13	.278	7	–	23	.233
Wichita State	4	–	14	.222	10	–	22	.313
Charlotte	4	–	14	.222	11	–	21	.344
Florida Atlantic	3	–	15	.167	11	–	21	.344
† 2025 AAC tournament winner

2024–25 Atlantic 10 women's basketball standings
	Conf.				Overall
Team	W		L	PCT	W		L	PCT
Richmond	17	–	1	.944	28	–	7	.800
George Mason †	14	–	4	.778	27	–	6	.818
Davidson	13	–	5	.722	19	–	14	.576
Saint Joseph's	12	–	6	.667	24	–	10	.706
Rhode Island	11	–	7	.611	17	–	16	.515
Dayton	11	–	7	.611	18	–	13	.581
UMass	11	–	7	.611	17	–	15	.531
Fordham	9	–	9	.500	15	–	15	.500
Duquesne	9	–	9	.500	21	–	13	.618
Saint Louis	7	–	11	.389	15	–	19	.441
VCU	6	–	12	.333	12	–	19	.387
George Washington	5	–	13	.278	13	–	18	.419
Loyola Chicago	5	–	13	.278	13	–	17	.433
La Salle	3	–	15	.167	10	–	23	.303
St. Bonaventure	2	–	16	.111	6	–	24	.200
† 2025 A10 tournament winner

2024–25 ACC women's basketball standings
	Conf.				Overall
Team	W		L	PCT	W		L	PCT
No. 9 NC State	16	–	2	.889	28	–	7	.800
No. 8 Notre Dame	16	–	2	.889	28	–	6	.824
No. 7 Duke †	14	–	4	.778	29	–	8	.784
No. 22 Florida State	13	–	5	.722	24	–	9	.727
No. 12 North Carolina	13	–	5	.722	29	–	8	.784
Louisville	13	–	5	.722	22	–	11	.667
California	12	–	6	.667	25	–	9	.735
Virginia Tech	9	–	9	.500	19	–	13	.594
Georgia Tech	9	–	9	.500	22	–	11	.667
Virginia	8	–	10	.444	17	–	15	.531
Stanford	8	–	10	.444	16	–	15	.516
Boston College	6	–	12	.333	16	–	18	.471
Syracuse	6	–	12	.333	12	–	18	.400
Clemson	6	–	12	.333	14	–	17	.452
Pittsburgh	5	–	13	.278	13	–	19	.406
Miami (FL)	4	–	14	.222	14	–	15	.483
Wake Forest	2	–	16	.111	9	–	20	.310
SMU	2	–	16	.111	10	–	20	.333
† 2025 ACC tournament winner Rankings from AP Poll

2024–25 ASUN women's basketball standings
	Conf.				Overall
Team	W		L	PCT	W		L	PCT
Florida Gulf Coast †	18	–	0	1.000	30	–	4	.882
Central Arkansas	15	–	3	.833	23	–	10	.697
Lipscomb	12	–	6	.667	20	–	12	.625
Eastern Kentucky	10	–	8	.556	21	–	12	.636
Stetson	10	–	8	.556	16	–	15	.516
North Alabama	8	–	10	.444	13	–	17	.433
Jacksonville	8	–	10	.444	14	–	17	.452
Bellarmine	8	–	10	.444	18	–	15	.545
West Georgia*	7	–	11	.389	13	–	17	.433
Austin Peay	7	–	11	.389	13	–	18	.419
Queens*	4	–	14	.222	10	–	19	.345
North Florida	1	–	17	.056	5	–	26	.161
† 2025 ASUN tournament winner * ineligible for the 2025 NCAA tournament due to transition from Division II

2024–25 Big 12 Conference women's basketball standings
	Conf.				Overall
Team	W		L	PCT	W		L	PCT
No. 6 TCU †	16	–	2	.889	34	–	4	.895
No. 14 Baylor	15	–	3	.833	28	–	8	.778
No. 17 Oklahoma State	14	–	4	.778	25	–	7	.781
No. 16 West Virginia	13	–	5	.722	25	–	8	.758
No. 19 Kansas State	13	–	5	.722	28	–	8	.778
Utah	13	–	5	.722	22	–	9	.710
Iowa State	12	–	6	.667	23	–	12	.657
Arizona	10	–	8	.556	19	–	14	.576
Colorado	9	–	9	.500	21	–	13	.618
Cincinnati	7	–	11	.389	15	–	14	.517
Kansas	6	–	12	.333	16	–	14	.533
BYU	4	–	14	.222	13	–	17	.433
UCF	4	–	14	.222	12	–	18	.400
Texas Tech	4	–	14	.222	19	–	18	.514
Arizona State	3	–	15	.167	10	–	22	.313
Houston	1	–	17	.056	5	–	25	.167
† 2025 Big 12 tournament winner Rankings from AP poll

2024–25 Big East women's basketball standings
	Conf.				Overall
Team	W		L	PCT	W		L	PCT
No. 1 UConn †	18	–	0	1.000	37	–	3	.925
No. 23 Creighton	16	–	2	.889	26	–	7	.788
Seton Hall	13	–	5	.722	23	–	10	.697
Marquette	12	–	6	.667	21	–	11	.656
Villanova	11	–	7	.611	21	–	15	.583
DePaul	8	–	10	.444	13	–	19	.406
Providence	6	–	12	.333	13	–	19	.406
St. John's	5	–	13	.278	16	–	15	.516
Butler	5	–	13	.278	16	–	18	.471
Georgetown	4	–	14	.222	12	–	19	.387
Xavier	1	–	17	.056	7	–	24	.226
† 2025 Big East tournament winner Rankings from AP poll

2024–25 Big Sky women's basketball standings
	Conf.				Overall
Team	W		L	PCT	W		L	PCT
Montana State †	17	–	1	.944	30	–	4	.882
Northern Arizona	16	–	2	.889	27	–	8	.771
Idaho	10	–	8	.556	18	–	12	.600
Weber State	10	–	8	.556	13	–	16	.448
Idaho State	8	–	10	.444	14	–	17	.452
Montana	8	–	10	.444	14	–	18	.438
Eastern Washington	7	–	11	.389	11	–	20	.355
Sacramento State	7	–	11	.389	15	–	18	.455
Northern Colorado	6	–	12	.333	14	–	17	.452
Portland State	1	–	17	.056	4	–	24	.143
† 2025 Big Sky tournament winner

2024–25 Big South women's basketball standings
	Conf.				Overall
Team	W		L	PCT	W		L	PCT
High Point †	13	–	3	.813	21	–	12	.636
Longwood	11	–	5	.688	22	–	12	.647
Radford	10	–	6	.625	14	–	17	.452
Charleston Southern	10	–	6	.625	14	–	16	.467
Winthrop	9	–	7	.563	16	–	15	.516
Gardner–Webb	8	–	8	.500	11	–	18	.379
USC Upstate	6	–	10	.375	9	–	21	.300
Presbyterian	4	–	12	.250	6	–	24	.200
UNC Asheville	1	–	15	.063	4	–	27	.129
† 2025 Big South tournament winner

2024–25 Big Ten women's basketball standings
	Conf.				Overall
Team	W		L	PCT	W		L	PCT
No. 5 USC	17	–	1	.944	31	–	4	.886
No. 3 UCLA †	16	–	2	.889	34	–	3	.919
No. 19 Ohio State	13	–	5	.722	26	–	7	.788
No. 12 Maryland	13	–	5	.722	25	–	8	.758
No. 25 Michigan	11	–	7	.611	23	–	11	.676
Michigan State	11	–	7	.611	22	–	10	.688
Illinois	11	–	7	.611	22	–	10	.688
Oregon	10	–	8	.556	20	–	12	.625
Indiana	10	–	8	.556	20	–	13	.606
Nebraska	10	–	8	.556	21	–	12	.636
Iowa	10	–	8	.556	23	–	11	.676
Washington	9	–	9	.500	19	–	14	.576
Minnesota	8	–	10	.444	25	–	11	.694
Wisconsin	4	–	14	.222	13	–	17	.433
Rutgers	3	–	15	.167	13	–	20	.394
Purdue	3	–	15	.167	10	–	19	.345
Northwestern	2	–	16	.111	9	–	18	.333
Penn State	1	–	17	.056	10	–	19	.345
† 2025 Big Ten tournament winner As of April 7, 2025; Rankings from AP poll

2024–25 Big West women's basketball standings
	Conf.				Overall
Team	W		L	PCT	W		L	PCT
Hawai'i	16	–	4	.800	22	–	10	.688
UC Irvine	15	–	5	.750	21	–	10	.677
UC Davis	13	–	7	.650	21	–	12	.636
UC San Diego †	13	–	7	.650	20	–	16	.556
UC Santa Barbara	12	–	8	.600	18	–	13	.581
Long Beach State	12	–	8	.600	16	–	14	.533
UC Riverside	12	–	8	.600	17	–	15	.531
Cal Poly	8	–	12	.400	14	–	18	.438
Cal State Fullerton	5	–	15	.250	7	–	23	.233
Cal State Bakersfield	2	–	18	.100	2	–	28	.067
Cal State Northridge	2	–	18	.100	4	–	25	.138
† 2025 Big West tournament winner

2024–25 CAA women's basketball standings
	Conf.				Overall
Team	W		L	PCT	W		L	PCT
North Carolina A&T	15	–	3	.833	19	–	12	.613
Charleston	14	–	4	.778	25	–	8	.758
Campbell	12	–	6	.667	22	–	13	.629
Drexel	12	–	6	.667	17	–	13	.567
Monmouth	10	–	8	.556	16	–	15	.516
Elon	9	–	9	.500	15	–	15	.500
Delaware	9	–	9	.500	13	–	17	.433
Hofstra	9	–	9	.500	14	–	16	.467
William & Mary †	8	–	10	.444	16	–	19	.457
UNC Wilmington	8	–	10	.444	14	–	18	.438
Towson	8	–	10	.444	12	–	20	.375
Stony Brook	7	–	11	.389	12	–	18	.400
Hampton	3	–	15	.167	8	–	23	.258
Northeastern	2	–	16	.111	3	–	25	.107
† 2025 CAA tournament winner

2024–25 Conference USA women's basketball standings
	Conf.				Overall
Team	W		L	PCT	W		L	PCT
Liberty †	16	–	2	.889	26	–	7	.788
Middle Tennessee	16	–	2	.889	26	–	9	.743
Western Kentucky	13	–	5	.722	23	–	9	.719
New Mexico State	10	–	8	.556	18	–	16	.529
Louisiana Tech	8	–	10	.444	18	–	16	.529
FIU	7	–	11	.389	11	–	19	.367
Kennesaw State	7	–	11	.389	13	–	18	.419
Sam Houston	5	–	13	.278	13	–	17	.433
Jacksonville State	4	–	14	.222	10	–	20	.333
UTEP	4	–	14	.222	11	–	19	.367
† 2025 CUSA tournament winner

2024–25 Horizon League women's basketball standings
	Conf.				Overall
Team	W		L	PCT	W		L	PCT
Green Bay †	19	–	1	.950	29	–	6	.829
Purdue Fort Wayne	18	–	2	.900	27	–	9	.750
Cleveland State	14	–	6	.700	27	–	10	.730
Robert Morris	10	–	10	.500	15	–	16	.484
Northern Kentucky	8	–	12	.400	11	–	21	.344
Detroit Mercy	8	–	12	.400	15	–	15	.500
IU Indy	8	–	12	.400	9	–	21	.300
Wright State	7	–	13	.350	10	–	22	.313
Youngstown State	7	–	13	.350	12	–	19	.387
Oakland	6	–	14	.300	9	–	22	.290
Milwaukee	5	–	15	.250	8	–	24	.250
† 2025 Horizon League tournament winner

2024–25 Ivy League women's basketball standings
	Conf.				Overall
Team	W		L	PCT	W		L	PCT
Columbia	13	–	1	.929	24	–	7	.774
Princeton	12	–	2	.857	21	–	8	.724
Harvard †	11	–	3	.786	24	–	5	.828
Penn	6	–	8	.429	15	–	13	.536
Brown	6	–	8	.429	12	–	15	.444
Cornell	3	–	11	.214	7	–	20	.259
Yale	3	–	11	.214	4	–	23	.148
Dartmouth	2	–	12	.143	8	–	19	.296
† 2025 Ivy League tournament winner

2024–25 MAAC women's basketball standings
	Conf.				Overall
Team	W		L	PCT	W		L	PCT
Fairfield †	19	–	1	.950	28	–	5	.848
Quinnipiac	18	–	2	.900	28	–	5	.848
Siena	14	–	6	.700	17	–	14	.548
Mount St. Mary's	12	–	8	.600	15	–	16	.484
Marist	11	–	9	.550	16	–	15	.516
Merrimack	9	–	11	.450	14	–	17	.452
Saint Peter's	9	–	11	.450	11	–	19	.367
Manhattan	9	–	11	.450	16	–	15	.516
Canisius	9	–	11	.450	10	–	21	.323
Iona	8	–	12	.400	11	–	21	.344
Rider	5	–	15	.250	7	–	22	.241
Sacred Heart	5	–	15	.250	9	–	20	.310
Niagara	2	–	18	.100	3	–	25	.107
† 2025 MAAC tournament winner

2024–25 Mid-American Conference women's basketball standings
	Conf.				Overall
Team	W		L	PCT	W		L	PCT
Ball State †	16	–	2	.889	27	–	8	.771
Toledo	13	–	5	.722	24	–	9	.727
Buffalo	13	–	5	.722	30	–	7	.811
Kent State	12	–	6	.667	21	–	12	.636
Miami (OH)	11	–	7	.611	19	–	12	.613
Bowling Green	11	–	7	.611	18	–	13	.581
Central Michigan	9	–	9	.500	14	–	17	.452
Western Michigan	8	–	10	.444	12	–	18	.400
Northern Illinois	6	–	12	.333	13	–	17	.433
Akron	4	–	14	.222	10	–	21	.323
Ohio	4	–	14	.222	6	–	23	.207
Eastern Michigan	1	–	17	.056	2	–	27	.069
† 2025 MAC tournament winner

2024–25 MEAC women's basketball standings
	Conf.				Overall
Team	W		L	PCT	W		L	PCT
Norfolk State †	14	–	0	1.000	30	–	5	.857
Howard	12	–	2	.857	22	–	12	.647
Maryland Eastern Shore	8	–	6	.571	14	–	17	.452
Coppin State	8	–	6	.571	19	–	15	.559
North Carolina Central	6	–	8	.429	9	–	21	.300
Morgan State	6	–	8	.429	13	–	17	.433
Delaware State	1	–	13	.071	5	–	24	.172
South Carolina State	1	–	13	.071	2	–	29	.065
† 2025 MEAC tournament winner

2024–25 Missouri Valley Conference women's basketball standings
	Conf.				Overall
Team	W		L	PCT	W		L	PCT
Murray State †	16	–	4	.800	25	–	8	.758
Missouri State	16	–	4	.800	26	–	9	.743
Belmont	15	–	5	.750	26	–	13	.667
Drake	15	–	5	.750	22	–	12	.647
Illinois State	14	–	6	.700	24	–	13	.649
Northern Iowa	11	–	9	.550	17	–	17	.500
UIC	10	–	10	.500	15	–	18	.455
Valparaiso	9	–	11	.450	13	–	19	.406
Bradley	7	–	13	.350	14	–	19	.424
Evansville	3	–	17	.150	7	–	25	.219
Southern Illinois	2	–	18	.100	4	–	26	.133
Indiana State	2	–	18	.100	4	–	28	.125
† 2025 MVC tournament winner

2024–25 Mountain West Conference women's basketball standings
	Conf.				Overall
Team	W		L	PCT	W		L	PCT
UNLV	16	–	2	.889	26	–	8	.765
Wyoming	14	–	4	.778	22	–	12	.647
Colorado State	13	–	5	.722	22	–	10	.688
San Diego State †	11	–	7	.611	25	–	10	.714
New Mexico	11	–	7	.611	18	–	14	.563
Fresno State	8	–	10	.444	19	–	15	.559
Air Force	7	–	11	.389	18	–	15	.545
Boise State	7	–	11	.389	18	–	15	.545
Nevada	6	–	12	.333	11	–	21	.344
Utah State	3	–	15	.167	4	–	27	.129
San Jose State	3	–	15	.167	10	–	22	.313
† 2025 Mountain West tournament winner

2024–25 Northeast Conference women's basketball standings
	Conf.				Overall
Team	W		L	PCT	W		L	PCT
Fairleigh Dickinson †	16	–	0	1.000	29	–	4	.879
Stonehill*	11	–	5	.688	17	–	16	.515
Central Connecticut	10	–	6	.625	11	–	19	.367
Saint Francis	9	–	7	.563	11	–	19	.367
Le Moyne*	6	–	10	.375	7	–	24	.226
Mercyhurst*	6	–	10	.375	9	–	18	.333
Chicago State	6	–	10	.375	7	–	26	.212
Wagner	5	–	11	.313	8	–	21	.276
LIU	3	–	13	.188	6	–	24	.200
† 2025 NEC tournament winner * ineligible for the 2025 NCAA tournament due to transition from Division II

2024–25 Ohio Valley Conference women's basketball standings
	Conf.				Overall
Team	W		L	PCT	W		L	PCT
Tennessee Tech †	18	–	2	.900	26	–	6	.813
Lindenwood*	16	–	4	.800	23	–	11	.676
Eastern Illinois	15	–	5	.750	18	–	12	.600
Little Rock	12	–	8	.600	14	–	16	.467
Southern Indiana*	12	–	8	.600	23	–	13	.639
UT Martin	10	–	10	.500	13	–	19	.406
Western Illinois	8	–	12	.400	17	–	17	.500
Tennessee State	6	–	14	.300	10	–	21	.323
Morehead State	5	–	15	.250	10	–	20	.333
Southeast Missouri State	4	–	16	.200	6	–	23	.207
SIU Edwardsville	4	–	16	.200	6	–	23	.207
† 2025 OVC tournament winner * ineligible for the 2025 NCAA tournament due to transition period

2024–25 Patriot League women's basketball standings
	Conf.				Overall
Team	W		L	PCT	W		L	PCT
Lehigh †	15	–	3	.833	27	–	7	.794
Army	14	–	4	.778	25	–	8	.758
Colgate	13	–	5	.722	23	–	10	.697
Navy	11	–	7	.611	19	–	12	.613
Holy Cross	11	–	7	.611	19	–	12	.613
Bucknell	11	–	7	.611	17	–	14	.548
Lafayette	6	–	12	.333	10	–	21	.323
Boston University	5	–	13	.278	12	–	19	.387
Loyola	3	–	15	.167	9	–	21	.300
American	1	–	17	.056	1	–	29	.033
† 2025 Patriot League tournament winner

2024–25 SEC women's basketball standings
	Conf.				Overall
Team	W		L	PCT	W		L	PCT
No. 2 South Carolina †	15	–	1	.938	35	–	4	.897
No. 5 Texas	15	–	1	.938	35	–	4	.897
No. 10 LSU	12	–	4	.750	31	–	6	.838
No. 13 Kentucky	11	–	5	.688	23	–	8	.742
No. 11 Oklahoma	11	–	5	.688	27	–	8	.771
No. 21 Alabama	10	–	6	.625	24	–	9	.727
No. 25 Ole Miss	10	–	6	.625	22	–	11	.667
Vanderbilt	8	–	8	.500	22	–	11	.667
No. 20 Tennessee	8	–	8	.500	24	–	10	.706
Mississippi State	7	–	9	.438	22	–	12	.647
Florida	5	–	11	.313	19	–	18	.514
Georgia	4	–	12	.250	13	–	19	.406
Arkansas	3	–	13	.188	10	–	22	.313
Auburn	3	–	13	.188	12	–	18	.400
Missouri	3	–	13	.188	14	–	18	.438
Texas A&M	3	–	13	.188	10	–	19	.345
† 2025 SEC tournament winner Rankings from AP poll

2024–25 SWAC women's basketball standings
	Conf.				Overall
Team	W		L	PCT	W		L	PCT
Southern †	15	–	3	.833	21	–	15	.583
Texas Southern	14	–	4	.778	17	–	16	.515
Alabama A&M	14	–	4	.778	21	–	11	.656
Jackson State	13	–	5	.722	16	–	15	.516
Grambling State	12	–	6	.667	15	–	15	.500
Alcorn State	10	–	8	.556	14	–	18	.438
Bethune–Cookman	7	–	11	.389	10	–	21	.323
Florida A&M	6	–	12	.333	9	–	21	.300
Mississippi Valley State	6	–	12	.333	8	–	23	.258
Prairie View A&M	6	–	12	.333	10	–	19	.345
Alabama State	4	–	14	.222	6	–	24	.200
Arkansas–Pine Bluff	1	–	17	.056	3	–	25	.107
† 2025 SWAC tournament winner

2024–25 Southern Conference women's basketball standings
	Conf.				Overall
Team	W		L	PCT	W		L	PCT
UNC Greensboro †	13	–	1	.929	25	–	7	.781
Chattanooga	9	–	5	.643	17	–	15	.531
East Tennessee State	8	–	6	.571	17	–	13	.567
Wofford	8	–	6	.571	17	–	12	.586
Samford	7	–	7	.500	12	–	19	.387
Furman	5	–	9	.357	16	–	16	.500
Mercer	3	–	11	.214	8	–	22	.267
Western Carolina	3	–	11	.214	13	–	17	.433
† 2025 SoCon tournament winner

2024–25 Southland Conference women's basketball standings
	Conf.				Overall
Team	W		L	PCT	W		L	PCT
Southeastern Louisiana	19	–	1	.950	26	–	6	.813
Lamar	17	–	3	.850	22	–	8	.733
Stephen F. Austin †	16	–	4	.800	29	–	6	.829
Incarnate Word	12	–	8	.600	18	–	14	.563
Northwestern State	12	–	8	.600	16	–	16	.500
UT Rio Grande Valley	11	–	9	.550	16	–	16	.500
Nicholls	9	–	11	.450	17	–	14	.548
Texas A&M–Corpus Christi	7	–	13	.350	15	–	17	.469
New Orleans	5	–	15	.250	5	–	24	.172
McNeese	5	–	15	.250	10	–	21	.323
East Texas A&M*	4	–	16	.200	7	–	22	.241
Houston Christian	3	–	17	.150	6	–	23	.207
† 2025 Southland tournament winner * ineligible for the 2025 NCAA tournament due to transition from Division II

2024–25 Summit League women's basketball standings
	Conf.				Overall
Team	W		L	PCT	W		L	PCT
No. 24 South Dakota State †	16	–	0	1.000	30	–	4	.882
Oral Roberts	12	–	4	.750	24	–	9	.727
North Dakota State	11	–	5	.688	21	–	12	.636
St. Thomas*	9	–	7	.563	16	–	14	.533
North Dakota	6	–	10	.375	12	–	19	.387
Kansas City	6	–	10	.375	12	–	21	.364
South Dakota	5	–	11	.313	11	–	20	.355
Omaha	5	–	11	.313	14	–	17	.452
Denver	2	–	14	.125	9	–	21	.300
† 2025 Summit League tournament winner * Ineligible for the 2025 NCAA tournament due to transition from Division III; Rankings from AP poll

2024–25 Sun Belt Conference women's basketball standings
	Conf.				Overall
Team	W		L	PCT	W		L	PCT
James Madison	18	–	0	1.000	30	–	6	.833
Arkansas State †	15	–	3	.833	21	–	11	.656
Troy	13	–	5	.722	24	–	14	.632
Coastal Carolina	12	–	6	.667	23	–	9	.719
Old Dominion	9	–	9	.500	18	–	16	.529
Appalachian State	9	–	9	.500	13	–	17	.433
Louisiana	9	–	9	.500	13	–	16	.448
Georgia State	8	–	10	.444	17	–	16	.515
Louisiana–Monroe	7	–	11	.389	11	–	19	.367
Texas State	7	–	11	.389	13	–	17	.433
Marshall	6	–	12	.333	15	–	20	.429
Georgia Southern	6	–	12	.333	16	–	18	.471
Southern Miss	5	–	13	.278	10	–	21	.323
South Alabama	2	–	16	.111	6	–	24	.200
† 2025 Sun Belt tournament winner

2024–25 WAC women's basketball standings
	Conf.				Overall
Team	W		L	PCT	W		L	PCT
Grand Canyon †	16	–	0	1.000	32	–	3	.914
Tarleton	10	–	6	.625	20	–	14	.588
UT Arlington	10	–	6	.625	18	–	14	.563
Abilene Christian	9	–	7	.563	22	–	13	.629
Utah Valley	9	–	7	.563	19	–	13	.594
California Baptist	9	–	7	.563	12	–	19	.387
Southern Utah	7	–	9	.438	9	–	21	.300
Utah Tech	1	–	15	.063	6	–	25	.194
Seattle	1	–	15	.063	4	–	26	.133
† 2025 WAC tournament winner

2024–25 West Coast Conference women's basketball standings
	Conf.				Overall
Team	W		L	PCT	W		L	PCT
Gonzaga	17	–	3	.850	24	–	11	.686
Portland	17	–	3	.850	31	–	5	.861
Washington State	14	–	6	.700	21	–	14	.600
Oregon State †	12	–	8	.600	19	–	16	.543
San Francisco	11	–	9	.550	15	–	16	.484
Saint Mary's	10	–	10	.500	14	–	17	.452
Pacific	9	–	11	.450	15	–	19	.441
Santa Clara	8	–	12	.400	14	–	17	.452
Loyola Marymount	7	–	13	.350	14	–	16	.467
Pepperdine	3	–	17	.150	8	–	22	.267
San Diego	2	–	18	.100	7	–	24	.226
† 2025 WCC tournament winner

== Award winners ==
=== 2025 All-Americans ===
The NCAA has never recognized a consensus All-America team in women's basketball. This differs from the practice in men's basketball, in which the NCAA uses a combination of selections by the Associated Press (AP), the National Association of Basketball Coaches (NABC), The Sporting News and the U.S. Basketball Writers Association (USBWA) to determine a consensus All-America team. The selection of a consensus team is possible because all four organizations select at least a first and second team, with only the USBWA not selecting a third team.

In women's basketball, the AP, USBWA, and the women's basketball counterpart to the NABC, the Women's Basketball Coaches Association (WBCA), select All-America teams. The Sporting News does not select such a team. While the AP and USBWA each select first, second, and third teams, the WBCA selects a single 10-member team, thus making it impossible for a consensus team to be determined at any level.

=== Major player of the year awards ===
- Wooden Award: JuJu Watkins, USC
- Naismith Award: JuJu Watkins, USC
- Associated Press Player of the Year: JuJu Watkins, USC
- Wade Trophy: Paige Bueckers, UConn
- Ann Meyers Drysdale Women's Player of the Year (USBWA): JuJu Watkins, USC
- Honda Sports Award: Paige Bueckers, UConn

=== Major freshman of the year awards ===
- Tamika Catchings Award (USBWA): Mikayla Blakes, Vanderbilt
- WBCA Freshman of the Year: Sarah Strong, UConn

=== Major coach of the year awards ===
- Associated Press Coach of the Year: Cori Close, UCLA
- Naismith College Coach of the Year: Cori Close, UCLA
- Geno Auriemma Award (USBWA): Cori Close, UCLA
- WBCA National Coach of the Year: Cori Close, UCLA
- WBCA Assistant Coach of the Year: Tony Newman, UCLA

=== Other major awards ===
- Naismith Starting Five:
  - Nancy Lieberman Award (top point guard): Paige Bueckers, UConn
  - Ann Meyers Drysdale Award (top shooting guard): JuJu Watkins, USC
  - Cheryl Miller Award (top small forward): Madison Booker, Texas
  - Katrina McClain Award (top power forward): Aneesah Morrow, LSU
  - Lisa Leslie Award (top center): Lauren Betts, UCLA
- WBCA Defensive Player of the Year: Lauren Betts, UCLA
- Naismith Women's Defensive Player of the Year: Lauren Betts, UCLA
- Becky Hammon Mid-Major Player of the Year Award: Harmoni Turner, Harvard
- Kathy Delaney-Smith Mid-Major Coach of the Year Award: Aaron Roussell, Richmond
- Maggie Dixon Award (top rookie head coach): Jan Jensen, Iowa
- Academic All-American of the Year (top scholar-athlete): Kiki Iriafen, USC
- Elite 90 Award (top GPA among upperclass players at Final Four): Kiki Rice, UCLA
- Pat Summitt Most Courageous Award: For the first time in nearly 50 years, this award and its corresponding men's award were not presented to college basketball figures. The awards went to the boys' and girls' teams of Palisades Charter High School in Los Angeles, which both posted winning seasons in the wake of the wildfire that destroyed much of the campus as well as the homes of multiple players on both teams.

== Coaching changes ==
Many teams will change coaches during the season and after it ends.

Team	Former	Interim	New	Reason
Alabama State	Freda Freeman-Jackson	—N/a	Johnetta Hayes	Freeman-Jackson announced her retirement from Alabama State on March 25, 2025, after 27 seasons. Rutgers assistant coach Hayes, previously head coach at Texas Southern and UMBC, was hired by the Lady Hornets on April 11.
American	Tiffany Coll	—N/a	Kelly Killion	After a 20–71 record in 3 seasons, American announced on March 9, 2025, that Coll will not return next season. Penn associate head coach Killion was hired by the Eagles on April 2.
Arizona	Adia Barnes	—N/a	Becky Burke	Barnes left Arizona on April 5, 2025, after 9 seasons for SMU. Buffalo head coach Burke was hired by the Wildcats on April 9.
Arizona State	Natasha Adair	—N/a	Molly Miller	ASU fired Adair on March 8, 2025, after a 29–62 record in 3 seasons. Grand Canyon head coach Miller was hired by the Sun Devils on March 22.
Arkansas	Mike Neighbors	—N/a	Kelsi Musick	Neighbors announced his resignation from Arkansas on March 11, 2025, after 8 seasons and a 148–114 record. The Razorbacks hired Oral Roberts head coach Musick on March 21.
Army	Missy Traversi	—N/a	Katie Kuester	Army and Traversi mutually agreed to part ways on May 6, 2025, after 4 seasons. Saint Joseph's assistant Kuester was hired by the Black Knights on May 22.
Auburn	Johnnie Harris	—N/a	Larry Vickers	Auburn fired Harris on March 6, 2025, after 4 seasons and a 58–63 record. Norfolk State head coach Vickers was hired by the Tigers on March 23.
Bellarmine	Chancellor Dugan	—N/a	Monique Reid	Dugan announced her retirement on April 2, 2025, after 34 seasons as head coach, the last 13 spent at Bellarmine. Knights assistant coach Reid was promoted to the position on April 11.
Buffalo	Becky Burke	—N/a	Kristen Sharkey	Burke left Buffalo on April 9, 2025, after 3 seasons for the Arizona head coaching position. Syracuse associate head coach and former Bulls standout player Sharkey was hired on April 18.
BYU	Amber Whiting	—N/a	Lee Cummard	BYU announced that they had parted ways with Whiting on March 8, 2025, after 3 seasons and a 45–51 record. Cougars associate head coach Cummard, who was initially named interim head coach following Whiting's departure, was officially promoted on March 31.
Cal State Fullerton	Jeff Harada	—N/a	John Bonner	Harada's contract with Fullerton was not renewed on March 21, 2025, after 8 seasons. Bonner, who spent the past 9 seasons as head coach of Division II Cal State Dominguez Hills, was hired by the Titans on May 6.
Central Connecticut	Way Veney	—N/a	Kristin Caruso	After 2 seasons at CCSU, Veney announced on April 7, 2025, that she was leaving to pursue other opportunities. Blue Devils assistant coach Caruso was promoted to fill the position 4 days later.
Colgate	Ganiyat Adeduntan	Macey Hollenshead	Shannon Bush	Adeduntan left Colgate on March 20, 2025, after 4 seasons to return to George Washington, where she was an assistant there before coming to Colgate. Raiders assistant coach Hollenshead was named interim head coach for the WNIT. After the season, Cornell associate head coach Bush was named the new head coach on April 14.
Coppin State	Jermaine Woods	—N/a	Darrell Mosley	Woods left Coppin State on April 4, 2025, after 3 seasons for conference rival Norfolk State. Mosley, the associate head coach at Arizona State this past season, was hired by the Eagles on April 14.
DePaul	Doug Bruno	—N/a	Jill Pizzotti	Bruno, who had been on a medical leave of absence this season, announced on March 28, 2025, that he was stepping down from his head coaching position after 39 years, and that he would stay with DePaul as special assistant to the vice president and director of athletics for women's basketball. Blue Demons associate head coach Pizzotti, who was serving as acting head coach during Bruno's medical leave, was officially promoted to the position on April 3.
Detroit Mercy	Kate Achter	—N/a	Kiefer Haffey	Achter left Detroit on March 28, 2025, after 3 seasons for Western Michigan. Titans associate head coach Haffey was promoted to the position on April 14.
Florida Atlantic	Jennifer Sullivan	—N/a	LeAnn Freeland	Sullivan left FAU on March 25, 2025, after 4 seasons for an assistant coaching position at Missouri. Freeland, the longtime head coach at Division II Nova Southeastern, was hired by the Owls on April 1.
Florida Gulf Coast	Karl Smesko		Chelsea Lyles	Smesko, who had been FGCU's head coach since the program began in 2002, announced his departure just two games into the season on November 13, 2024, to become head coach for the WNBA's Atlanta Dream. Eagles associate head coach Lyles, who played for Smesko from 2008 to 2010 and had been on the coaching staff since 2011, was promoted to the position the same day.
Florida Gulf Coast	Chelsea Lyles	—N/a	Raina Harmon	Following her only season as head coach, Lyles announced on March 24, 2025, that she was stepping down from the position. Iowa assistant coach Harmon was hired on April 4.
Fresno State	Jaime White	—N/a	Ryan McCarthy	White announced she was stepping down from her head coaching position on March 24, 2025, after 11 seasons at Fresno State. Longtime Division II Alaska Anchorage head coach McCarthy was hired by the Bulldogs on April 14.
Gardner–Webb	Scott Merritt	Katie Nelson	Terri Williams	Merritt, who was in his 2nd season at Gardner-Webb, was fired on February 6, 2025, but the school has not provided a reason for his dismissal. Associate head coach Katie Nelson was named the Runnin' Bulldogs interim head coach for the remainder of the season. After the season, Penn State associate head coach Williams, formerly the head coach at Georgetown and Auburn, was hired on April 11.
George Washington	Caroline McCombs	Doug Novak	Ganiyat Adeduntan	McCombs stepped down from her head coaching position on February 24, 2025, after 3+ seasons at GW. Revolutionaries assistant coach Novak served as the interim head coach for the rest of the season. On March 20, the school hired former GW assistant and Colgate head coach Adeduntan.
Georgia Tech	Nell Fortner	—N/a	Karen Blair	Fortner announced her retirement on March 31, 2025, after 6 seasons at Georgia Tech and 15 overall as head coach. Maryland associate head coach Blair was hired by the Yellow Jackets on April 6.
Grand Canyon	Molly Miller	—N/a	Winston Gandy	Miller left GCU on March 22, 2025, after 5 seasons for Arizona State. South Carolina assistant Gandy was hired by the Antelopes two days later.
Holy Cross	Maureen Magarity	Candice Green		Magarity, citing family reasons, announced her resignation from Holy Cross on August 20, 2024, after 4 seasons. Crusaders assistant coach Green was initially named interim head coach for the season. On February 24, 2025, Holy Cross removed the interim tag from Green, officially naming her head coach.
Houston	Ronald Hughey	—N/a	Matthew Mitchell	Hughey announced his resignation from Houston on March 6, 2025, after 11 seasons. The Cougars hired former Kentucky head coach Mitchell as his replacement on March 27.
Houston Christian	Donna Finnie	—N/a	Drew Long	Finnie's contract with HCU was not renewed on March 11, 2025, ending her 12-year tenure. On April 2, the Huskies hired Division II McMurry head coach Long as her replacement.
Incarnate Word	Jeff Dow	Amber Cunningham	Jhasmin Player	Incarnate Word did not renew Dow's contract on March 17, 2025, ending his 6-year tenure. With the Cardinals making the WNIT, assistant coach Cunningham was named interim head coach for the WNIT. Oklahoma State associate head coach Player was hired on March 28.
Liberty	Carey Green	—N/a	Alexis Sherard	Green announced his retirement on August 28, 2025, after 26 seasons at Liberty with longtime associate head coach Sherard being named his successor. Green led the Lady Flames to 591 wins, 31 conference titles (15 regular season and 16 conference tournament), and 15 NCAA Tournament appearances.
LIU	Rene Haynes	—N/a	Neil Harrow	Haynes announced via social media that she was resigning on April 17, 2025, after 6 seasons at LIU. James Madison associate head coach Harrow was hired by the Sharks on April 22.
Louisiana–Monroe	Missy Bilderback	—N/a	Scotty Fletcher	Bilderback departed ULM on March 23, 2025, after 2 seasons for the head coaching job at her alma mater and conference rival Southern Miss. Fletcher, head coach of NJCAA Pearl River CC the last 10 years, was hired by the Warhawks on March 28.
McNeese	Lynn Kennedy	—N/a	Ayla Guzzardo	Kennedy's contract with McNeese was not renewed on March 6, 2025, after 4 seasons. On March 22, The Cowgirls hired Guzzardo from conference rival Southeastern Louisiana as his replacement.
Mercyhurst	Brooklyn Kohlheim	—N/a	Erin Mills-Reid	Mercyhurst announced a change in leadership in the program, parting ways with Kohlheim on March 10, 2025, after 6 seasons. Akron assistant Mills-Reid, who began her coaching career as an assistant for the Lakers from 2006 to 2007, was hired on April 9.
Missouri	Robin Pingeton	—N/a	Kellie Harper	Pingeton announced her resignation on February 26, 2025, after 15 seasons at Mizzou, effective at the conclusion of the season. Under Pingeton, the Tigers went 250–218, with 4 NCAA tournament appearances. Kellie Harper, most recently head coach at her alma mater Tennessee, was hired as her replacement on March 18.
Montana	Brian Holsinger	Nate Harris		Holsinger announced his resignation from Montana on February 10, 2025, after 3½ seasons. He had been on administrative leave from the school since January 15 for personal reasons. Associate head coach Harris, who was serving as the Lady Griz's interim head coach during Holsinger's absence, continued in that role for the rest of the season. On March 18, Harris was officially named the new head coach of the program.
Morgan State	Ed Davis Jr.	—N/a	Nadine Domond	Davis Jr. announced his retirement on March 18, 2025, after 9 seasons at Morgan State. Domond, head coach of Division II Virginia State, was hired by the Lady Bears on April 9.
Norfolk State	Larry Vickers	—N/a	Jermaine Woods	Vickers left NSU on March 23, 2025, after 9 seasons for the Auburn head coaching position. Staying in the MEAC, the Spartans hired Coppin State head coach Woods on April 4.
North Dakota	Mallory Bernhard	—N/a	Dennis Hutter	Bernhard announced her resignation from UND on March 24, 2025, after 5 seasons, with Fighting Hawks associate head coach Hutter being named her replacement.
Northern Arizona	Loree Payne	—N/a	Laura Dinkins	Payne left NAU on March 24, 2025, after 8 seasons for the Santa Clara head coaching position. Grand Canyon associate head coach and former Lumberjack standout Dinkins was hired for the job on April 1.
Northern Illinois	Lisa Carlsen	—N/a	Jacey Brooks	Carlson resigned from NIU on March 10, 2025, after 10 seasons. Brooks, the associate head coach at conference rival Buffalo, was hired by the Huskies on April 1.
Oakland	Jeff Tungate	Deanna Richard	Keisha Newell	Tungate, who was in his 12th season as Oakland head coach, announced his retirement on December 9, 2024, with Golden Grizzlies associate head coach Richard being named interim head coach for the remainder of the season. After the season, the school hired Newell from Division II Lewis University on March 24, 2025.
Omaha	Carrie Banks	—N/a	Jamie Carey	Omaha announced on April 22, 2025 that Banks will not return next season, ending her 5-year tenure. The Mavericks hired UTSA associate head coach Carey as her replacement on May 4.
Oral Roberts	Kelsi Musick	—N/a	Cophie Anderson	Musick left ORU on March 21, 2025, after 3 seasons for the Arkansas head coaching position. On March 31, Golden Eagles associate head coach Anderson was promoted to the position.
Portland State	Chelsey Gregg	—N/a	Karlie Burris	PSU parted ways with Gregg after 4 seasons and a 32–87 record on March 12, 2025. UNLV assistant coach Burris was hired by the Vikings on April 4.
Prairie View A&M	Sandy Pugh	—N/a	Tai Dillard	Pugh resigned from Prairie View A&M on March 17, 2025, after 7 seasons. Dillard, most recently associate head coach at Houston, was hired by the Lady Panthers on April 28.
Rider	Lynn Milligan	—N/a	Jackie Hartzell	Rider announced on March 10, 2025, that Milligan will not return next season, ending her 18-year tenure at her alma mater. On April 3, the Broncs hired Hartzell from Division III Arcadia University to replace Milligan.
Saint Francis	Keila Whittington	—N/a	Chynna Bozeman	After a 56–155 record in 6 seasons at Saint Francis, Whittington resigned on March 20, 2025. Following a 2+ month search, the Red Flash promoted top assistant Bozeman to the position on May 30.
Samford	Carley Kuhns	—N/a	Matt Wise	Kuhns announced her resignation from Samford on April 17, 2025 after 6 seasons. Bulldogs associate head coach Wise was promoted to the position the following day.
San Diego	Cindy Fisher	—N/a	Blanche Alverson	San Diego announced on February 22, 2025, that Fisher will not return after the season, ending her 20-year tenure with the school. Her 346 wins at USD makes her the all-time winningest head coach of the program. The Toreros hired Georgia Tech associate head coach Alverson as her replacement on March 25.
San Jose State	April Phillips	—N/a	Jonas Chatterton	After a 23–71 record in 3 seasons, SJSU announced on March 24, 2025, that Phillips will not be retained. Oklahoma associate head coach Chatterton was hired by the Spartans on April 25.
Santa Clara	Bill Carr	Michael Floyd	Loree Payne	Carr announced his resignation from Santa Clara on October 12, 2024, after 8 seasons. Broncos associate head coach Floyd was tabbed as the interim head coach for the season. After the season, the school hired Northern Arizona head coach Payne on March 25, 2025.
SMU	Toyelle Wilson	—N/a	Adia Barnes	SMU parted ways with Wilson on March 30, 2025, after 4 seasons and a 55–64 record. Arizona head coach Barnes was hired by the Mustangs on April 5.
South Carolina State	Tim Eatman	—N/a	Cedric Baker	Eatman announced his resignation from SCSU on May 2, 2025, after 3 seasons. Baker, the longtime head coach at Division II Savannah State, was hired by the Lady Bulldogs 4 days later.
Southeastern Louisiana	Ayla Guzzardo	—N/a	Jeff Dow	Guzzardo left Southeastern Louisiana on March 22, 2025, after 8 seasons for the head coaching position at conference rival McNeese. Jeff Dow, who spent the last six years at another of SE Louisiana's conference rival in Incarnate Word, was hired by the Lady Lions on March 25.
Southern Miss	Joye Lee-McNelis	—N/a	Missy Bilderback	Lee-McNelis announced on February 25, 2025, that she will retire at the end of the season, her 21st at her alma mater. Lee-McNelis, who had been coaching the past 2 seasons while battling stage IV lung cancer, her fourth bout in 7 years, leaves as the program's winningest head coach with 339 wins. Southern Miss alum and conference rival Louisiana-Monroe head coach Bilderback was hired by the Lady Eagles on March 23. Lee-McNelis died on June 24, 2025, less than 4 months after she announced her retirement, at the age of 63.
Texas A&M Corpus–Christi	Royce Chadwick	—N/a	Toyelle Wilson	After 13 years at TAMU–CC and 41 overall, Chadwick announced his retirement on April 2, 2025. The Islanders hired former Prairie View A&M and SMU head coach Wilson as his replacement on April 10.
UMass Lowell	Denise King	—N/a	Jon Plefka	UMass Lowell parted ways with King on March 5, 2025, after a 35–97 record in 5 seasons. Stony Brook assistant coach Plefka was named the new head coach of the River Hawks on April 25.
Utah	Lynne Roberts	—N/a	Gavin Petersen	Roberts left Utah on November 19, 2024, after four games in her 10th season to become the new head coach of the WNBA's Los Angeles Sparks. Utes associate head coach Petersen was named as Roberts' replacement that same day.
Valparaiso	Mary Evans	—N/a	Courtney Boyd	Valpo and Evans mutually agreed to part ways on March 18, 2025, after 7 seasons and a 73–135 record. On April 4, the Beacons hired Division II Quincy head coach Boyd.
Western Michigan	Shane Clipfell	—N/a	Kate Achter	Clipfell, WMU's all-time winningest head coach with 184 wins, announced his retirement on March 17, 2025, after 13 seasons with the program. The Broncos stayed in-state for their next hire, naming Detroit Mercy head coach Achter as his replacement on March 28.
Wisconsin	Marisa Moseley	—N/a	Robin Pingeton	Citing personal reasons, Moseley announced her resignation from Wisconsin on March 9, 2025, after 4 seasons. Former Missouri head coach Pingeton was hired by the Badgers on March 25.

== See also ==
- 2024–25 NCAA Division I men's basketball season
