= 2025–26 Western Athletic Conference women's basketball season =

2025–26 WAC women's basketball season
- League: NCAA Division I
- Sport: Basketball
- Teams: 7
- TV partner(s): ESPN, ESPN+

Regular season

WAC tournament

WAC women's basketball seasons
- ← 2024–25 2026–27 →

2025–26 WAC women's basketball standings
	Conf.				Overall
Team	W		L	PCT	W		L	PCT
California Baptist †	15	–	3	.833	23	–	11	.676
Abilene Christian	13	–	5	.722	24	–	11	.686
Southern Utah	11	–	7	.611	19	–	13	.594
Utah Valley	9	–	9	.500	16	–	15	.516
Tarleton	7	–	11	.389	14	–	17	.452
UT Arlington	4	–	14	.222	12	–	21	.364
Utah Tech	4	–	14	.222	9	–	20	.310
† 2026 WAC tournament winner

The 2025–26 WAC women's basketball season began with practices in October followed by the start of the 2025–26 NCAA Division I women's basketball season in early November 2025. The conference begins play in December 2025. This is the WAC's 64th season of basketball. The WAC competes with seven teams due to two teams having left the conference since the prior season. Seattle and Grand Canyon both joined the other conferences since the prior year. The WAC tournament will be held in March 2026 with all seven teams competing for the automatic bid to the 2026 NCAA Division I women's basketball tournament. All rounds will be played at the Orleans Arena in the Las Vegas-area community of Paradise, Nevada.

This will be the last season under the WAC's current identity. California Baptist and Utah Valley will join the Big West Conference and Southern Utah and Utah Tech will join the Big Sky Conference on July 1, 2026. At that time, the WAC will rebrand as the United Athletic Conference (UAC), previously the name of a football-only alliance between the WAC and the Atlantic Sun Conference (ASUN). Three remaining teams—Abilene Christian, Tarleton State, and UT Arlington—will be joined by new members of the rebranded UAC.

== Pre-season ==
=== WAC Preseason polling ===
Women's Basketball Coaches Preseason Poll
Place	Team	Points	First place votes
1.	Abilene Christian	32	2
2.	California Baptist	31	4
3.	UT Arlington	25	1
4.	Utah Valley	23	
5.	Tarleton	18	
6.	Utah Tech	12	
7.	Southern Utah	6	

=== WAC Preseason All-Conference ===
First Team

Name	School	Yr.	Pos.
Payton Hull†	Abilene Christian	Junior	G
Meredith Mayes	Abilene Christian	Junior	C
Khloe Lemon	California Baptist	Junior	G
Jakoriah Long	Tarleton State	Senior	G
Amanda Barcello	Utah Valley	Senior	G/F

† Denotes Preseason Player of the Year

== Regular season ==
=== Early season tournaments ===
Team	Tournament	Finish
Abilene Christian	Fort Myers Tip-Off	0–2
California Baptist	CBU Classic	1–1
Southern Utah	LMU Christmas Tournament	1–1
Tarleton	ACU Christmas Classic	1–1
UT Arlington	Hawaii North Shore Showcase	2–1
Utah Tech	N/A	N/A
Utah Valley	N/A	N/A

=== Records against other conferences ===
2025–26 records against non-conference foes:

Regular season

Power Conferences & Gonzaga	Record
ACC	0–0
Big East	0–0
Big Ten	0–2
Big 12	0–6
Pac-12	0–0
SEC	1–2
Power Conference Total	1–10
Other NCAA Division I Conferences	Record
America East	0–0
American	1–1
A-10	1–0
ASUN	0–0
Big Sky	6–4
Big South	0–0
Big West	5–4
CAA	0–0
C-USA	1–2
Horizon	0–0
Ivy League	0–0
MAAC	0–0
MAC	2–0
MEAC	0–0
MVC	0–1
Mountain West	2–5
NEC	1–0
OVC	2–0
Patriot League	0–0
SoCon	0–0
Southland	4–4
SWAC	2–0
Summit	3–1
Sun Belt	1–1
WCC	4–1
Other Division I Total	35–25
Non-Division I Total	10–0
NCAA Division I Total	36–35

=== Record against ranked non-conference opponents ===
This is a list of games against ranked opponents only (rankings from the AP poll/Coaches poll):

Date	Visitor	Home	Score
November 20, 2025	Tarleton State	#10/8 TCU	L, 80–32
December 21, 2025	California Baptist	#25/23 Nebraska	L, 87–56
December 21, 2025	UT Arlington	#5/5 LSU	L, 110–45

Team rankings are reflective of AP poll/Coaches poll when the game was played, not current or final ranking.

=== Rankings ===
	Improvement in ranking
	Drop in ranking
RV	Received votes but were not ranked in Top 25
NV	No votes received

		Pre	Wk 2	Wk 3	Wk 4	Wk 5	Wk 6	Wk 7	Wk 8	Wk 9	Wk 10	Wk 11	Wk 12	Wk 13	Wk 14	Wk 15	Wk 16	Wk 17	Wk 18	Wk 19	Wk 20	Final
Abilene Christian	AP	NV	NV	NV	NV	NV	NV	NV	NV	NV	NV	NV	NV	NV	NV	NV	NV	NV	NV	NV	NV	
Abilene Christian	C	NV	NV	NV	NV	NV	NV	NV	NV	NV	NV	NV	NV	NV	NV	NV	NV	NV	NV	NV	NV	
California Baptist	AP	NV	NV	NV	NV	NV	NV	NV	NV	NV	NV	NV	NV	NV	NV	NV	NV	NV	NV	NV	NV	
California Baptist	C	NV	NV	NV	NV	NV	NV	NV	NV	NV	NV	NV	NV	NV	NV	NV	NV	NV	NV	NV	NV	
Southern Utah	AP	NV	NV	NV	NV	NV	NV	NV	NV	NV	NV	NV	NV	NV	NV	NV	NV	NV	NV	NV	NV	
Southern Utah	C	NV	NV	NV	NV	NV	NV	NV	NV	NV	NV	NV	NV	NV	NV	NV	NV	NV	NV	NV	NV	
Tarleton	AP	NV	NV	NV	NV	NV	NV	NV	NV	NV	NV	NV	NV	NV	NV	NV	NV	NV	NV	NV	NV	
Tarleton	C	NV	NV	NV	NV	NV	NV	NV	NV	NV	NV	NV	NV	NV	NV	NV	NV	NV	NV	NV	NV	
UT Arlington	AP	NV	NV	NV	NV	NV	NV	NV	NV	NV	NV	NV	NV	NV	NV	NV	NV	NV	NV	NV	NV	
UT Arlington	C	NV	NV	NV	NV	NV	NV	NV	NV	NV	NV	NV	NV	NV	NV	NV	NV	NV	NV	NV	NV	
Utah Tech	AP	NV	NV	NV	NV	NV	NV	NV	NV	NV	NV	NV	NV	NV	NV	NV	NV	NV	NV	NV	NV	
Utah Tech	C	NV	NV	NV	NV	NV	NV	NV	NV	NV	NV	NV	NV	NV	NV	NV	NV	NV	NV	NV	NV	
Utah Valley	AP	NV	NV	NV	NV	NV	NV	NV	NV	NV	NV	NV	NV	NV	NV	NV	NV	NV	NV	NV	NV	
Utah Valley	C	NV	NV	NV	NV	NV	NV	NV	NV	NV	NV	NV	NV	NV	NV	NV	NV	NV	NV	NV	NV	

== Head coaches ==
=== Coaching changes ===
No coaching changes were made during the offseason.

=== Coaches ===
Note: Stats shown are before the beginning of the season. Overall and WAC records are from time at current school.

Team	Head coach	Previous job	Seasons at school	Overall record	WAC record	WAC titles	NCAA tournaments	NCAA Final Fours	NCAA Championships
Abilene Christian	Julie Goodenough	Charleston Southern	14th	248–142 (.636)	147–82 (.642)	2	1	0	0
California Baptist	Jarrod Olson	Florida Southern	14th	145–73 (.665)	85–33 (.720)	2	1	0	0
Southern Utah	Tracy Mason	St. Mary's (associate HC)	8th	93–108 (.463)	29–25 (.537)	1	1	0	0
Tarleton	Bill Brock	McLennan Community College	3rd	32–34 (.485)	17–19 (.472)	0	0	0	0
UT Arlington	Shereka Wright	Vanderbilt (associate HC)	6th	81–61 (.570)	51–33 (.607)	0	1	0	0
Utah Tech	JD Gustin	Weber State (assistant)	10th	54–72 (.429)	29–43 (.403)	0	0	0	0
Utah Valley	Dan Nielson	BYU (associate HC)	7th	75–93 (.446)	46–55 (.455)	0	1	0	0

Notes:

- Overall and WAC records, conference titles, etc. are from time at current school and are through the end of the 2023–24 season.
- Records and season totals only include time spent at Division I as head coach.
- NCAA tournament appearances are from time at current school only.
- NCAA Final Fours and Championship include time at other schools.

== Postseason ==
=== WAC tournament ===
The WAC tournament was held in March 2026 with all seven teams competing for the automatic bid to the 2025 NCAA Division I men's basketball tournament. All rounds were played at the Orleans Arena in the Las Vegas-area community of Paradise, Nevada.

=== NCAA tournament ===
Teams from the conference that were selected to participate: 1

Seed	Region	School	First Four	First round	Second round	Sweet Sixteen	Elite Eight	Final Four	Championship
16	Sacramento 2	California Baptist	N/A	–	–	–	–	–	–
	Bids	W-L (%):	0–0 (–)	0–0 (–)	0–0 (–)	0–0 (–)	0–0 (–)	0–0 (–)	TOTAL: 0–0 (–)

=== Women's Basketball Invitation Tournament ===
Number from the conference that were selected to participate: 0

Seed	School	First round	Quarterfinals	Semifinals	Finals
		–	–	–	–
	W-L (%):	0–0 (–)	0–0 (–)	0–0 (–)	TOTAL: 0–0 (–)

=== Women's National Invitation Tournament ===
Number from the conference that were selected to participate: 3

Seed	School	First round	Second round	Super 16	Great 8	Semifinals	Finals
N/A	Abilene Christian	–	–	–	–	–	–
N/A	Southern Utah	–	–	–	–	–	–
N/A	Utah Valley	–	–	–	–	–	–
	W-L (%):	0–0 (–)	0–0 (–)	0–0 (–)	0–0 (–)	0–0 (–)	TOTAL: 0–0 (–)

Index to colors and formatting
WAC member won
WAC member lost

*Denotes overtime period

== Awards and honors ==
=== Players of the week ===
Throughout the conference regular season, the WAC offices name a player of the week and a newcomer of the week each Monday.

Week	Player of the Week	School	Newcomer of the Week	School
November 10	Brooklyn Fely	Southern Utah	Brooklyn Fely	Southern Utah
November 17	Sierra Chambers	Southern Utah	Lauren Olsen	California Baptist
November 24	Filipa Barros	California Baptist	Kaylee Borden	Utah Tech
December 1	Kira Reynolds	UT Arlington	Kira Reynolds	UT Arlington
December 8	Meredith Mayes	Abilene Christian	Kira Reynolds	UT Arlington
December 15	Payton Hull	Abilene Christian	Kaylee Headrick	Utah Valley
December 22	Ava Uhrich	Southern Utah	Shadasia Brackens	Tarleton State
January 5	Lauren Olsen	California Baptist	Lauren Olsen	California Baptist
January 12	Ava Uhrich	Southern Utah	Kira Reynolds	UT Arlington
January 20	Erin Woodson	Abilene Christian	Kira Reynolds	UT Arlington
January 26	Brooklyn Fely	Southern Utah	Brooklyn Fely	Southern Utah
February 2	Filipa Barros	California Baptist	Brooklyn Fely	Southern Utah
February 9	Payton Hull	Abilene Christian	Elodie Lutbert	Tarleton State
February 16	Payton Hull	Abilene Christian	Brooklyn Fely	Southern Utah
February 23	Ava Uhrich	Southern Utah	Kaylee Borden	Utah Tech
March 2	Erin Woodson	Abilene Christian	Lauren Olsen	California Baptist
March 9	Filipa Barros	California Baptist	Kaylee Borden	Utah Tech

==== Totals per school - Players of the week ====
School	Player of the week	Newcomer of the week	Total
Abilene Christian University	6		6
California Baptist University	4	3	7
Southern Utah University	6	5	11
Tarleton State University		2	2
University of Texas at Arlington	1	4	5
Utah Tech University		2	2
Utah Valley University		1	1
Total	17	17	34

=== All-WAC ===
First team

Name	School
Payton Hull‡	Abilene Christian
Filipa Barros	California Baptist
Lauren Olsen	California Baptist
Ava Ulrich	Southern Utah
Kaylee Borden	Utah Tech

- ‡ WAC Player of the Year

Second team

Name	School
Erin Woodson	Abilene Christian
Emma Johansson	California Baptist
Grace Schmidt	California Baptist
Sierra Chambers	Southern Utah
Brooklyn Fely	Southern Utah
Jakoriah Long	Tarleton
Cambree Blackham	Utah Valley

==== All-Freshman team ====
Name	School
Reyleigh Hess	California Baptist
Lauren Olsen†	California Baptist
Devyn Kiernan	Southern Utah
Elodie Lutbert	Tarleton
Kiera Reynolds	UT Arlington

† Freshman of the Year

==== All-Defensive team ====
Name	School
Payton Hull‡	Abilene Christian
Emma Johansson	California Baptist
Elodie Lutbert	Tarleton
Brie Crittendon	Utah Tech
Cambree Blackham	Utah Valley

- ‡WAC Defensive Player of the Year

==== Other awards ====
Sixth Woman of the Year: Khloe Lemon, California Baptist

Coach of the Year: Jarrod Olson, California Baptist

== 2025 WNBA draft ==
Round	Pick	Player	Position	Nationality	Team	School/club team
−	−				−	

== Home game attendance ==
Team	Stadium	Capacity	Game 1	Game 2	Game 3	Game 4	Game 5	Game 6	Game 7	Game 8	Game 9	Game 10	Game 11	Game 12	Game 13	Game 14	Game 15	Game 16	Game 17	Total	Average	% of Capacity
Abilene Christian	Moody Coliseum	3,600	1,002	575	1,080	†1,500	775	877	500	593	712	846	894	799	1,167	1,283	1,127	1,231		14,961	935	26%
California Baptist	CBU Events Center	5,050	1,085	1,029	421	515	354	368	358	309	483	†4,157	742	501	437	559	731			12,049	803	16%
Southern Utah	America First Event Center	5,300	366	423	313	236	†831	405	559	469	560	441	461	392	345	439				6,240	446	8%
Tarleton State	EECU Center	8,000	753	†1,103	723	953	1,090	832	878	772	802	837	747	392	701	533				11,116	794	10%
UT Arlington	College Park Center	7,000	586	695	†912	729	721	761	473	562	613	810	637	795	760					9,054	696	10%
Utah Tech	Burns Arena	4,779	436	552	572	613	616	538	537	495	†837	512	579	580	597	307	588	579	746	9,684	570	12%
Utah Valley	Lockhart Arena/UCCU Center	2,000/8,500	581	671	520	539	492	†1,316	648	544	1,113	681	‡679	‡761	584	761	1,076			10,966	731	9%
Total		42,229																		74,070	4,975	13%

Bold – At or exceed capacity; capacity ratios for Utah Valley computed based on larger home arena; attendance is for regular season only

- †Season high
- ‡Lockhart Arena

== See also ==
- 2025–26 Western Athletic Conference men's basketball season
