= Dan Nielson (basketball) =

American basketball coach

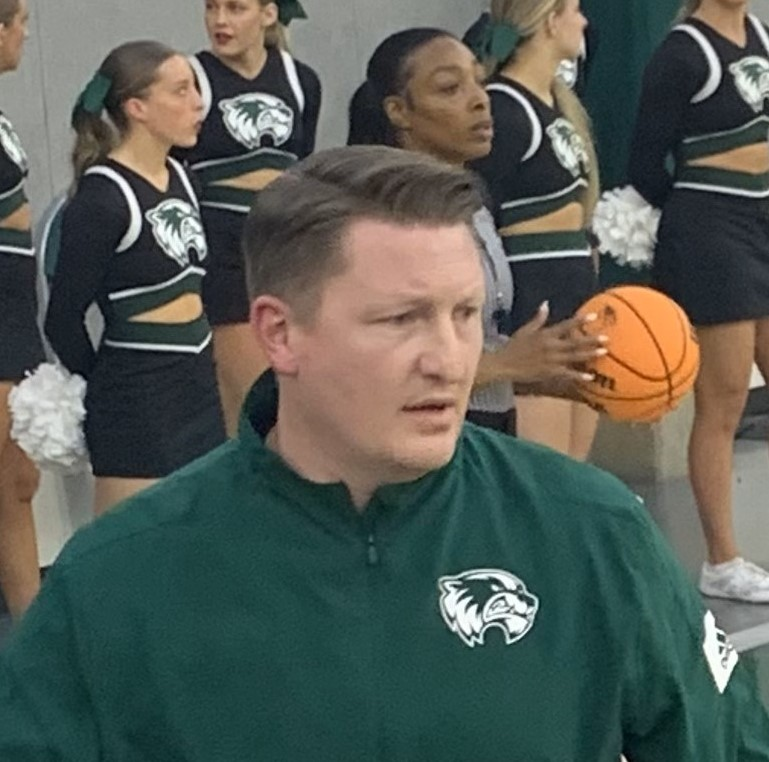
- Nielson in 2024

Current position
- Title: Head coach
- Team: Utah Valley
- Conference: Big West
- Record: 92–109 (.458)

Biographical details
- Born: March 13, 1983 (age 43); Round Rock, Texas
- Education: BYU (2006)

Coaching career (HC unless noted)
- 2001–2005: BYU (volunteer assistant)
- 2007–2009: BYU (director of basketball ops.)
- 2009–2013: Utah Valley (assistant)
- 2013–2017: BYU (assistant)
- 2017–2019: BYU (associate HC)
- 2019–present: Utah Valley

Head coaching record
- Overall: 92–109 (.458)
- Tournaments: 0–1 (NCAA); 1–2 (WNIT)

Dan Nielson (born March 13, 1983) is an American basketball coach who is currently the head women's basketball coach at Utah Valley University, a role he has held since 2019. He was previously the associate head coach at Brigham Young University (BYU), and has spent the entirety of his coaching career with either BYU or Utah Valley.

== Head coaching record ==
Record table
Season	Team	Overall	Conference	Standing	Postseason
Utah Valley Wolverines (Western Athletic Conference) (2019–2026)
2019–20	Utah Valley	12–16	9–6	3rd	
2020–21	Utah Valley	13–7	10–4	2nd (Note: California Baptist won the WAC tournament, but was ineligible for the NCAA Tournament due to its transition from Division II and instead played in the WNIT. Utah Valley received the WAC's bid by finishing in second place behind California Baptist in the regular season.)	NCAA Division I Round of 64
2021–22	Utah Valley	16–15	10–8	4th	
2022–23	Utah Valley	6–24	3–15	12th	
2023–24	Utah Valley	10–19	5–15	11th	
2024–25	Utah Valley	19–13	9–7	T–4th	WNIT Second Round
2025–26	Utah Valley	16–15	9–9	4th	WNIT First Round
Utah Valley:		92–109 (.458)	55–64 (.462)		
Total:		92–109 (.458)			
National champion Postseason invitational champion Conference regular season champion Conference regular season and conference tournament champion Division regular season champion Division regular season and conference tournament champion Conference tournament champion
