= Utah Valley Wolverines women's basketball =

American college basketball team

2026–27 Utah Valley Wolverines women's basketball team
- University: Utah Valley University
- First season: 1979–80; 47 years ago
- Athletic director: Dr. Jared Sumsion
- Head coach: Dan Nielson (7th season)
- Location: Orem, Utah
- Arena: UCCU Center (capacity: 8,500) and Lockhart Arena (capacity: 2,000)
- NCAA division: Division I
- Conference: Big West
- Nickname: Wolverines
- Colors: Green and white
- Student section: The Den

NCAA Division I tournament appearances
- 2021

Conference tournament champions
- Great West: 2010

Conference regular-season champions
- Great West: 2013

The Utah Valley Wolverines women's basketball team is the basketball team that represents Utah Valley University in Orem, Utah, United States. The school's team currently competes in the Big West Conference.

== History ==
Utah Valley began play in 1979 as a member of NJCAA. They joined Division I in 2003. They never reached the NCAA Tournament prior to 2013, due to the Great West Conference (their previous conference before joining the WAC in 2013) not getting an automatic bid to a postseason tournament. They won the 2010 Great West Conference women's basketball tournament, finishing runner-up in 2012 and 2013. In 2021, the Wolverines made their first appearance in the NCAA tournament after WAC champion, California Baptist could not participate due to being in the middle of a transition from Division II.

== Coaches ==
- Sharon Peterson (1979–1984)
- Tom Perkins (1984–1995)
- Cathy Nixon (1995–2019)
- Dan Nielson (2019–present)

== Postseason results ==
=== NCAA Tournament appearances ===
The Wolverines have appeared in one NCAA Division I women's basketball tournament and have an overall record of 0–1. UVU was matched with Stanford in the First Round and was defeated 44–87 in the Alamo Region.

Year	Seed	Round	Opponent	Result
2021	#16	First Round	#1 Stanford	L 44–87

=== WNIT Tournament appearances ===
The Wolverines have appeared in the Women's National Invitation Tournament (WNIT) two times. In 2025, the team defeated Air Force 70–64 before falling to Washington State 54–57. The following year, the Wolverines were again selected to participate in the WNIT and faced San Francisco. Their overall record in the WNIT is 1–2.

Year	Round	Opponent	Result
2025	Round 1 Round 2	Air Force; Washington State	W 70–64; L 54–57
2026	Round 1	San Francisco	L 50–80

== Seasons ==
Record table
Season	Coach	Overall	Conference	Standing	Postseason
Utah Valley (Western Athletic Conference) (2013–2026)
2013–14	Cathy Nixon	7–23	4–12	8th	
2014–15	Cathy Nixon	11–19	5–9	6th	
2015–16	Cathy Nixon	16–15	8–6	4th	
2016–17	Cathy Nixon	9–22	3–11	7th	
2017–18	Cathy Nixon	11–19	5–9	6th	
2018–19	Cathy Nixon	14–16	8–8	6th	
2019–20	Dan Nielson	12–16	9–6	3rd	
2020–21	Dan Nielson	13–7	10–4	2nd	NCAA Division I Round of 64
2021–22	Dan Nielson	16–15	10–8	4th	
2022–23	Dan Nielson	6–24	3–15	12th	
2023–24	Dan Nielson	10–19	5–15	10th	
2024–25	Dan Nielson	19–13	9–7	4th	WNIT Round 2
2025–26	Dan Nielson	16–15	9–9	4th	WNIT Round 1
Total:		160–223 (.418)			
National champion Postseason invitational champion Conference regular season champion Conference regular season and conference tournament champion Division regular season champion Division regular season and conference tournament champion Conference tournament champion

== Individual Honors ==
=== All-American ===
- Robyn Fairbanks, three times (2007, 2008 and 2009)

=== Conference player of the year ===
- Sammi Jensen, twice (2012 and 2013)

=== Hall of fame ===
- Tricia Ferrin
- Melani Francis Kirk

== Individual Records ==
- Points scored, single game: 43, Robyn Fairbanks
- Points scored, season: 708, Robyn Fairbanks
- Points scored, career: 2507, Robyn Fairbanks
- Rebounds, single game: 22, Sammi Jensen
- Rebounds, season: 394, Sammi Jensen
- Rebounds, career: 1,048, Robyn Fairbanks
- Assists, single game: 13, Abbie Beutler and Asumi Nakayama
- Assists, season: 180, Asumi Nakayama
- Assists, career: 553, Asumi Nakayama

== See also ==
- Utah Valley Wolverines men's basketball
