= 2021–22 California Baptist Lancers women's basketball team =

Intercollegiate basketball season

2021–22 California Baptist Lancers women's basketball
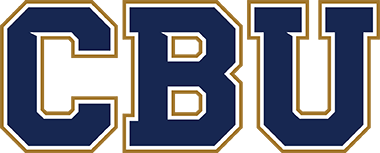

WNIT, First Round
- Conference: Western Athletic Conference
- Record: 23–9 (13–5 WAC)
- Head coach: Jarrod Olson (9th season)
- Assistant coaches: Jessica Case; Angie Ned; Brittany Sepeda
- Home arena: CBU Events Center

2021–22 WAC women's basketball standings
	Conf.				Overall
Team	W		L	PCT	W		L	PCT
Stephen F. Austin †	17	–	1	.944	28	–	5	.848
Grand Canyon	14	–	4	.778	22	–	10	.688
California Baptist*	13	–	5	.722	23	–	9	.719
Utah Valley	10	–	8	.556	16	–	15	.516
Abilene Christian	9	–	9	.500	17	–	13	.567
Sam Houston State	9	–	9	.500	15	–	16	.484
Tarleton State*	8	–	10	.444	16	–	13	.552
Lamar	8	–	10	.444	14	–	15	.483
Texas–Rio Grande Valley	8	–	10	.444	14	–	19	.424
Seattle	6	–	12	.333	11	–	19	.367
Dixie State*	6	–	12	.333	10	–	19	.345
New Mexico State	6	–	12	.333	10	–	19	.345
Chicago State	3	–	15	.167	4	–	23	.148
† 2022 WAC tournament winner * ineligible for the 2022 NCAA tournament due to transition from Division II

The 2021–22 California Baptist Lancers women's basketball team represented California Baptist University during the 2021–22 NCAA Division I women's basketball season. They were led by head coach Jarrod Olson, who was in his ninth season at California Baptist. The Lancers played their home games at the CBU Events Center in Riverside, California as members of the Western Athletic Conference.

This was CBU's fourth year of a four-year transition period from Division II to Division I. As a result, the Lancers were not eligible for NCAA postseason play.

== Roster ==
2021–22 California Baptist Lancers women's basketball team
Players
Coaches

Pos.	#	Name	Height	Year	Previous school	Hometown
G	1	Dorcas Wu	6 ft 0 in (1.83 m)	So	Chino Hills HS; Concordia (OR)	Chino Hills, CA
G	2	Nicola Avila-Ambrosi	5 ft 9 in (1.75 m)	Fr	Millard North HS	Omaha, NE
G	3	Ane Olaeta	5 ft 4 in (1.63 m)	GS	Gernika-Lumo	Gernika-Lumo, Spain
G	4	Naomi Yim	5 ft 7 in (1.7 m)	So	Norco HS; Loyola Marymount	Norco, CA
G	10	Georgia Dale	5 ft 6 in (1.68 m)	Sr	Box Hill Senior	Melbourne, Australia
C	11	Eliana Bravington	6 ft 3 in (1.91 m)	RS Fr	Rowville Secondary; Frankston Blues	Melbourne, Australia
G	13	Tiena Neale	5 ft 11 in (1.8 m)	So	King's Christian Collegiate	Toronto, ON
G	15	Sydney Palma	5 ft 9 in (1.75 m)	RS So	Boulder Creek HS	Phoenix, AZ
G	20	Jaelyn Acker	5 ft 7 in (1.7 m)	Fr	Germantown HS	Richfield, WI
G	21	Taylor Wu	5 ft 7 in (1.7 m)	So	ʻIolani School	Honolulu, HI
G	22	Océane Robin	6 ft 0 in (1.83 m)	Jr	South Plains College	Vitry-en-Artois, France
G	23	Trinity San Antonio	5 ft 10 in (1.78 m)	Fr	Centennial HS	Moreno Valley, CA
G	24	Brittany Klaman	5 ft 11 in (1.8 m)	GS	Williamstown HS; Eastern Washington	Melbourne, Australia
G	25	Mia Morel	5 ft 7 in (1.7 m)	Fr	Madison Memorial HS	Madison, WI
F	32	Britney Thomas	6 ft 1 in (1.85 m)	RS Sr	San Jacinto HS; Mt. San Antonio College	San Jacinto, CA
F	34	Caitlyn Harper	6 ft 1 in (1.85 m)	RS So	Arrowhead HS	Hartland, WI

Head coach

- Jarrod Olson (Doane)

Assistant coach(es)

- Jessica Case (Westmont)
- Angie Ned (UC Irvine)
- Brittany Sepeda (Cal Baptist)

Legend

- (C) Team captain
- (S) Suspended
- (I) Ineligible
- (W) Walk-on
- Injured
- Current redshirt

Roster
Last update: March 14, 2022

== Schedule ==
Date time, TV	Rank^{#}	Opponent^{#}	Result	Record	Site (attendance) city, state
Non-conference season
Nov 9, 2021*; 6:00 pm, ESPN+		at UC Riverside	W 62–59	1–0	UC Riverside Student Recreation Center (255); Riverside, CA
Nov 17, 2021*; 7:00 pm		at Oregon State	L 72–80	1–1	Gill Coliseum (3,754); Corvallis, OR
Nov 20, 2021*; 1:00 pm, ESPN+		UC Irvine	W 93–88 ^{OT}	2–1	CBU Events Center (651); Riverside, CA
Nov 26, 2021*; 12:00 pm		vs. UC Santa Barbara; Saint Mary's Thanksgiving Classic	W 68–56	3–1	University Credit Union Pavilion (138); Moraga, CA
Nov 27, 2021*; 12:00 pm		vs. TCU; Saint Mary's Thanksgiving Classic	W 91–77	4–1	University Credit Union Pavilion (138); Moraga, CA
Dec 2, 2021*; 2:00 pm, ESPN+		Pepperdine	W 63–57	5–1	CBU Events Center (593); Riverside, CA
Dec 8, 2021*; 6:00 pm, ESPN+		San Diego State	L 77–78	5–2	CBU Events Center (887); Riverside, CA
Dec 11, 2021*; 12:00 pm		at Northern Arizona	W 89–73	6–2	Walkup Skydome (115); Flagstaff, AZ
Dec 14, 2021*; 12:00 pm		at UC San Diego	W 74–73	7–2	RIMAC Arena (524); San Diego, CA
Dec 18, 2021*; 2:00 pm		at Santa Clara	W 58–54	8–2	Leavey Center (244); Santa Clara, CA
Dec 21, 2021*; 1:00 pm		at Cal Poly	W 66–64 ^{OT}	9–2	Mott Gym (379); San Luis Obispo, CA
WAC conference season
Jan 2, 2022; 2:00 pm, ESPN+		at Seattle	Postponed - Game moved to January 17, 2022		Redhawk Center; Seattle, WA
Jan 8, 2022; 1:00 pm, ESPN+		Chicago State	W 73–60	10–2 (1–0)	CBU Events Center (673); Riverside, CA
Jan 13, 2022; 6:00 pm, ESPN+		at Dixie State	W 88–60	11–2 (2–0)	Burns Arena (437); St. George, UT
Jan 15, 2022; 1:00 pm, ESPN+		at Utah Valley	W 83–68	12–2 (3–0)	UCCU Center (627); Orem, UT
Jan 17, 2022; 2:00 pm, ESPN+		at Seattle; Game moved from January 2, 2022	W 76–66	13–2 (4–0)	Redhawk Center (224); Seattle, WA
Jan 20, 2022; 6:00 pm, ESPN+		Tarleton State	W 85–69	14–2 (5–0)	CBU Events Center (480); Riverside, CA
Jan 22, 2022; 1:00 pm, ESPN+		Abilene Christian	W 77–71	15–2 (6–0)	CBU Events Center (419); Riverside, CA
Jan 27, 2022; 4:30 pm, ESPN+		at Sam Houston State	L 65–73	15–3 (6–1)	Bernard Johnson Coliseum (297); Huntsville, TX
Jan 29, 2022; 12:00 pm, ESPN+		at Stephen F. Austin	L 62–79	15–4 (6–2)	William R. Johnson Coliseum (1,465); Nacogdoches, TX
Feb 3, 2022; 6:00 pm, ESPN+		New Mexico State	W 92–64	16–4 (7–2)	CBU Events Center (497); Riverside, CA
Feb 5, 2022; 1:00 pm, ESPN+		Grand Canyon	L 52–61	16–5 (7–3)	CBU Events Center (489); Riverside, CA
Feb 10, 2022; 5:00 pm, ESPN+		at Lamar	W 71–56	17–5 (8–3)	Montagne Center (1,228); Beaumont, TX
Feb 12, 2022; 12:00 pm, ESPN+		at Texas–Rio Grande Valley	W 94–78	18–5 (9–3)	UTRGV Fieldhouse (527); Edinburg, TX
Feb 17, 2022; 5:00 pm, ESPN+		at Grand Canyon	L 55–75	18–6 (9–4)	Grand Canyon University Arena (501); Phoenix, AZ
Feb 19, 2022; 1:00 pm, ESPN+		Seattle	W 83–73	19–6 (10–4)	CBU Events Center (467); Riverside, CA
Feb 24, 2022; 6:00 pm, ESPN+		Dixie State	L 77–81	19–7 (10–5)	CBU Events Center (520); Riverside, CA
Feb 26, 2022; 1:00 pm, ESPN+		Utah Valley	W 84–59	20–7 (11–5)	CBU Events Center (531); Riverside, CA
Mar 2, 2022; 2:00 pm, ESPN+		at Chicago State	W 76–69 ^{OT}	21–7 (12–5)	Emil and Patricia Jones Convocation Center (115); Chicago, IL
Mar 5, 2022; 1:00 pm, ESPN+		Lamar	W 101–76	22–7 (13–5)	CBU Events Center (450); Riverside, CA
WAC Tournament
March 10, 2022; 2:30 pm, ESPN+	(3)	vs. (6) Sam Houston State; Third Round	W 85–78	23–7	Orleans Arena (307); Paradise, NV
March 11, 2022; 2:30 pm, ESPN+	(3)	vs. (2) Grand Canyon; Semifinals	L 60–64	23–8	Orleans Arena; Paradise, NV
WNIT
March 17, 2022; 6:00 pm		San Diego; First Round	L 67–76	23–9	CBU Events Center (836); Riverside, CA
*Non-conference game. ^{#}Rankings from AP Poll. (#) Tournament seedings in parentheses. All times are in Pacific Time.

== See also ==
- 2021–22 California Baptist Lancers men's basketball team
