= 2025–26 UT Arlington Mavericks women's basketball team =

American college basketball season

2025–26 UT Arlington Mavericks women's basketball
- Conference: Western Athletic Conference
- Record: 12–21 (4–14 WAC)
- Head coach: Shereka Wright (6th season)
- Associate head coach: KaeLynn Boyd
- Assistant coaches: Steven Reynolds Jr.; Ethan McIlhargey; Christian Chapman
- Home arena: College Park Center

2025–26 WAC women's basketball standings
| | Conf. | | | | Overall |
| Team | W | | L | PCT | W | | L | PCT |
|---|---|---|---|---|---|---|---|---|
| California Baptist † | 15 | – | 3 | .833 | 23 | – | 11 | .676 |
| Abilene Christian | 13 | – | 5 | .722 | 24 | – | 11 | .686 |
| Southern Utah | 11 | – | 7 | .611 | 19 | – | 13 | .594 |
| Utah Valley | 9 | – | 9 | .500 | 16 | – | 15 | .516 |
| Tarleton | 7 | – | 11 | .389 | 14 | – | 17 | .452 |
| UT Arlington | 4 | – | 14 | .222 | 12 | – | 21 | .364 |
| Utah Tech | 4 | – | 14 | .222 | 9 | – | 20 | .310 |
† 2026 WAC tournament winner

The 2025–26 UT Arlington Mavericks women's basketball team represents the University of Texas at Arlington during the 2025–26 NCAA Division I women's basketball season. The Mavericks, led by sixth-year head coach Shereka Wright, play their home games at the College Park Center in Arlington, Texas as members of the Western Athletic Conference.

== Previous season ==
The Mavericks finished the 2024–25 season 18–14, 10–6 in WAC play, to finish in a tie for second place. They defeated California Baptist and Tarleton State, before falling to top-seeded Grand Canyon in the WAC tournament championship game. They received an at-large bid to the WNIT, where they would defeat Incarnate Word in the first round, before falling to North Texas in the second round.

== Preseason ==
On October 29, 2025, the Western Athletic Conference released their preseason poll. UT Arlington was picked to finish third in the conference, with one first-place vote.

=== Preseason rankings ===
WAC Preseason Poll
| Place | Team | Votes |
|---|---|---|
| 1 | Abilene Christian | 32 (2) |
| 2 | California Baptist | 31 (4) |
| 3 | UT Arlington | 25 (1) |
| 4 | Utah Valley | 23 |
| 5 | Tarleton State | 18 |
| 6 | Utah Tech | 12 |
| 7 | Southern Utah | 6 |
(#) first-place votes

=== Preseason All-WAC Team ===
No players were named to the Preseason All-WAC Team.

== Roster ==
2025–26 UT Arlington Mavericks women's basketball team
Players
Coaches

| Pos. | # | Name | Height | Year | Previous school | Hometown |
|---|---|---|---|---|---|---|
| G | 0 | Kali Haizlip | 5 ft 9 in (1.75 m) | Sr | College of Southern Idaho | Puyallup, Washington |
| G | 1 | Amiyah Reynolds | 6 ft 0 in (1.83 m) | RS So | Purdue | South Bend, Indiana |
| G | 2 | Kendal Robinson | 5 ft 10 in (1.78 m) | So | North Crowley High School | Fort Worth, Texas |
| G | 3 | Erin Sellers | 5 ft 5 in (1.65 m) | RS So | Menlo College | Oakland, California |
| F | 4 | Laura Bello | 6 ft 3 in (1.91 m) | RS Sr | Idaho State | Dublin, Ireland |
| G | 5 | Nya Threatt | 5 ft 6 in (1.68 m) | Sr | Dulles High School | Missouri City, Texas |
| F | 11 | Kira Reynolds | 6 ft 4 in (1.93 m) | Fr | South Bend Washington High School | South Bend, Indiana |
| G | 13 | Jadyn Atchison | 6 ft 1 in (1.85 m) | Jr | Old Dominion | Cedar Hill, Texas |
| F | 15 | Mila Reynolds | 6 ft 3 in (1.91 m) | RS Jr | Purdue | South Bend, Indiana |
| G | 21 | Alexsyah Goudeau | 5 ft 10 in (1.78 m) | Sr | Tahlequah High School | Tahlequah, Oklahoma |
| F | 24 | Miraya Perkins | 5 ft 11 in (1.8 m) | Jr | Boswell High School | Dallas, Texas |
| C | 42 | Jeanne Rodriguez | 6 ft 2 in (1.88 m) | Jr | Salt Lake Community College | Landerneau, France |

Head coach

- Shereka Wright (Purdue)

Assistant coach(es)

- KaeLynn Boyd (Southeastern Louisiana)
- Steven Reynolds Jr. (Western Michigan)
- Ethan McIlhargey (Idaho)
- Christian Chapman (Cal State East Bay)

Legend

- (C) Team captain
- (S) Suspended
- (I) Ineligible
- (W) Walk-on
- Injured
- Current redshirt

Roster
Last update: January 26, 2026

== Schedule and results ==
| Date time, TV | Rank^{#} | Opponent^{#} | Result | Record | High points | High rebounds | High assists | Site (attendance) city, state |
Exhibition
| October 28, 2025*; 5:00 pm | | New Mexico | L 56–79 | – | 16 – K. Reynolds | 6 – Bello | 2 – Sellers | College Park Center (971); Arlington, TX |
Non-conference regular season
| November 4, 2025*; 6:30 pm, ESPN+ | | at Houston | L 59–76 | 0–1 | 15 – K. Reynolds | 16 – K. Reynolds | 1 – Tied | Fertitta Center (1,025); Houston, TX |
| November 7, 2025*; 6:30 pm, ESPN+ | | Missouri State | L 53–69 | 0–2 | 10 – Tied | 8 – K. Reynolds | 4 – Atchison | College Park Center (586); Arlington, TX |
| November 11, 2025*; 6:30 pm, ESPN+ | | Wyoming | W 64–44 | 1–2 | 14 – K. Reynolds | 13 – K. Reynolds | 4 – Tied | College Park Center (695); Arlington, TX |
| November 14, 2025*; 5:00 pm, ESPN+ | | Tennessee State | W 78–58 | 2–2 | 21 – Threatt | 6 – Tied | 5 – Threatt | College Park Center (912); Arlington, TX |
| November 16, 2025*; 2:00 pm, ESPN+ | | at Lamar | L 55−66 | 2−3 | 13 – Threatt | 6 – K. Reynolds | 3 – Atchison | Montagne Center (1,150); Beaumont, TX |
| November 22, 2025*; 8:00 pm, BallerTV | | vs. Colorado; Hawaii North Shore Showcase | L 60−71 | 2−4 | 14 – Tied | 8 – K. Reynolds | 4 – Threatt | George Q. Cannon Activities Center (350); Lāʻie, HI |
| November 24, 2025*; 4:00 pm, BallerTV | | vs. Texas A&M; Hawaii North Shore Showcase | W 61–60 | 3–4 | 22 – K. Reynolds | 12 – K. Reynolds | 3 – Tied | George Q. Cannon Activities Center (349); Lāʻie, HI |
| November 25, 2025*; 8:30 pm, BallerTV | | vs. VCU; Hawaii North Shore Showcase | W 61–39 | 4–4 | 11 – Perkins | 7 – Tied | 5 – Atchison | George Q. Cannon Activities Center (278); Lāʻie, HI |
| December 2, 2025*; 7:00 pm, ESPN+ | | at Little Rock | W 62–55 | 5–4 | 22 – K. Reynolds | 11 – K. Reynolds | 5 – Threatt | Jack Stephens Center (447); Little Rock, AR |
| December 12, 2025*; 11:15 am, ESPN+ | | at Rice | L 54–75 | 5–5 | 15 – M. Reynolds | 8 – A. Reynolds | 4 – Threatt | Tudor Fieldhouse (1,044); Houston, TX |
| December 17, 2025*; 6:30 pm, ESPN+ | | Texas Southern | W 81–73 | 6–5 | 17 – Haizlip | 11 – K. Reynolds | 4 – Tied | College Park Center (729); Arlington, TX |
| December 21, 2025*; 1:00 pm, SECN | | at No. 5 LSU | L 45−110 | 6−6 | 7 – Tied | 5 – Atchison | 2 – M. Reynolds | Pete Maravich Assembly Center (11,163); Baton Rouge, LA |
WAC regular season
| December 29, 2025; 7:00 pm, ESPN+ | | at Tarleton State | L 57–66 | 6–7 (0–1) | 15 – Atchison | 10 – Bello | 3 – Tied | EECU Center (832); Stephenville, TX |
| January 1, 2026; 3:00 pm, ESPN+ | | at California Baptist | L 64–85 | 6–8 (0–2) | 15 – K. Reynolds | 9 – A. Reynolds | 4 – A. Reynolds | Fowler Events Center (309); Riverside, CA |
| January 3, 2026; 2:00 pm, ESPN+ | | Southern Utah | L 55–58 | 6–9 (0–3) | 10 – Haizlip | 9 – K. Reynolds | 3 – Tied | College Park Center (721); Arlington, TX |
| January 10, 2026; 1:00 pm, ESPN+ | | at Abilene Christian | L 56–59 | 6–10 (0–4) | 21 – K. Reynolds | 7 – K. Reynolds | 4 – Tied | Moody Coliseum (712); Abilene, TX |
| January 15, 2026; 6:30 pm, ESPN+ | | Utah Tech | W 64–56 | 7–10 (1–4) | 17 – M. Reynolds | 7 – A. Reynolds | 3 – Tied | College Park Center (761); Arlington, TX |
| January 17, 2026; 1:00 pm, ESPN+ | | Utah Valley | W 59–47 | 8–10 (2–4) | 16 – K. Reynolds | 13 – K. Reynolds | 5 – Threatt | College Park Center (473); Arlington, TX |
| January 21, 2026; 7:00 pm, ESPN+ | | at Tarleton State | L 37–51 | 8–11 (2–5) | 7 – Haizlip | 6 – Bello | 1 – Tied | EECU Center (802); Stephenville, TX |
| January 29, 2026; 7:30 pm, ESPN+ | | at Southern Utah | L 68-77 | 8-12 (2-6) | 27 – Threatt | 6 – Bello | 2 – K. Reynolds | America First Event Center (441); Cedar City, UT |
| January 31, 2026; 3:00 pm, ESPN+ | | at California Baptist | L 55-83 | 8-13 (2-7) | 16 – Atchison | 15 – Bello | 1 – Tied | Fowler Events Center (742); Riverside, CA |
| February 5, 2026; 6:30 pm, ESPN+ | | Utah Tech | W 84-78 ^{2 OT} | 9-13 (3-7) | 20 – K. Reynolds | 15 – K. Reynolds | 3 – Tied | College Park Center (562); Arlington, TX |
| February 7, 2026; 1:00 pm, ESPN+ | | Utah Valley | W 60-59 ^{OT} | 10-13 (4-7) | 17 – Tied | 9 – Bello | 7 – Goudeau | College Park Center (613); Arlington, TX |
| February 12, 2026; 6:30 pm, ESPN+ | | Abilene Christian | L 63-72 | 10-14 (4-8) | 15 – Robinson | 6 – Tied | 2 – Tied | College Park Center (810); Arlington, TX |
| February 14, 2026; 3:00 pm, ESPN+ | | at Southern Utah | L 67-78 | 10-15 (4-9) | 24 – K. Reynolds | 6 – K. Reynolds | 2 – Tied | America First Event Center (392); Cedar City, UT |
| February 18, 2026; 8:00 pm, ESPN+ | | at Utah Tech | L 58-60 | 10-16 (4-10) | 14 – Tied | 9 – Atchison | 5 – Atchison | Burns Arena (588); St. George, UT |
| February 21, 2026; 2:00 pm, ESPN+ | | at Utah Valley | L 60-77 | 10-17 (4-11) | 17 – K. Reynolds | 6 – Bello | 6 – Goudeau | UCCU Center (584); Orem, UT |
| February 26, 2026; 6:30 pm, ESPN+ | | California Baptist | L 72-79 | 10-18 (4-12) | 19 – Atchison | 11 – K. Reynolds | 4 – Goudeau | College Park Center (637); Arlington, TX |
| March 5, 2026; 6:30 pm, ESPN+ | | Tarleton State | L 54-65 | 10-19 (4-13) | 15 – Atchison | 7 – Bello | 3 – Tied | College Park Center (611); Arlington, TX |
| March 7, 2026; 2:00 pm, ESPN+ | | Abilene Christian | L 57-72 | 10-20 (4-14) | 16 – K. Reynolds | 9 – K. Reynolds | 4 – Atchison | College Park Center (795); Arlington, TX |
WAC tournament
| March 11, 2026; 5:00 pm, ESPN+ | (6) | vs. (7) Utah Tech; First Round | W 77-73 | 11-20 | 21 – K. Reynolds | 16 – K. Reynolds | 5 – K. Reynolds | Orleans Arena (760); Las Vegas, NV |
| March 12, 2026; 4:30 pm, ESPN+ | (6) | vs. (3) Southern Utah; Quarterfinal | W 70-65 | 12-20 | 23 – K. Reynolds | 6 – Tied | 3 – Threatt | Orleans Arena (786); Las Vegas, NV |
| March 13, 2026; 4:30 pm, ESPN+ | (6) | vs. (2) Abilene Christian; Semifinal | L 50-70 | 12-21 | 8 – Tied | 4 – Bello | 3 – Tied | Orleans Arena (786); Las Vegas, NV |
*Non-conference game. ^{#}Rankings from AP Poll. (#) Tournament seedings in parentheses. All times are in Central.
