= 2025–26 Utah Tech Trailblazers women's basketball team =

American college basketball season

2025–26 Utah Tech Trailblazers women's basketball
- Conference: Western Athletic Conference
- Record: 9–20 (4–14 WAC)
- Head coach: JD Gustin (10th season)
- Assistant coaches: Alan Nakamura; Breaunna Gillen; Emily Chamberlain; Taylia Stimpson
- Home arena: Burns Arena

2025–26 WAC women's basketball standings
	Conf.				Overall
Team	W		L	PCT	W		L	PCT
California Baptist †	15	–	3	.833	23	–	11	.676
Abilene Christian	13	–	5	.722	24	–	11	.686
Southern Utah	11	–	7	.611	19	–	13	.594
Utah Valley	9	–	9	.500	16	–	15	.516
Tarleton	7	–	11	.389	14	–	17	.452
UT Arlington	4	–	14	.222	12	–	21	.364
Utah Tech	4	–	14	.222	9	–	20	.310
† 2026 WAC tournament winner

The 2025–26 Utah Tech Trailblazers women's basketball team represented Utah Tech University during the 2025–26 NCAA Division I women's basketball season. The Trailblazers, led by tenth-year head coach JD Gustin, played their home games at Burns Arena in St. George, Utah as members of the Western Athletic Conference.

== Previous season ==
The Trailblazers finished the 2024–25 season 6–25, 1–15 in WAC play, to finish in a tie for eighth (last) place. They defeated Seattle, before falling to top-seeded and eventual tournament champions Grand Canyon in the quarterfinals of the WAC tournament.

== Preseason ==
On October 29, 2025, the Western Athletic Conference released their preseason poll. Utah Tech was picked to finish sixth in the conference.

=== Preseason rankings ===
WAC Preseason Poll
Place	Team	Votes
1	Abilene Christian	32 (2)
2	California Baptist	31 (4)
3	UT Arlington	25 (1)
4	Utah Valley	23
5	Tarleton State	18
6	Utah Tech	12
7	Southern Utah	6
(#) first-place votes

=== Preseason All-WAC Team ===
No players were named to the Preseason All-WAC Team.

== Roster ==
2025–26 Utah Tech Trailblazers women's basketball team
Players
Coaches

Pos.	#	Name	Height	Year	Previous school	Hometown
G	1	Maddie Warren	5 ft 10 in (1.78 m)	RS Sr	Lehi High School	Lehi, Utah
G	2	Macie Warren	5 ft 10 in (1.78 m)	RS Sr	Lehi High School	Lehi, Utah
G	3	Calyn Dallas	6 ft 1 in (1.85 m)	Jr	Cooper High School	Lubbock, Texas
G	4	Brie Crittendon	5 ft 10 in (1.78 m)	RS Sr	Eastern Kentucky	Union, Kentucky
G	5	Chardonnay Hartley	5 ft 3 in (1.6 m)	Sr	Niagara	Harlem, New York
G	10	Andjela Colic	5 ft 7 in (1.7 m)	RS Fr	Karaburma Beograd	Belgrade, Serbia
F	11	Paige Cofer	6 ft 0 in (1.83 m)	So	Eagle High School	Eagle, Idaho
G	12	Ellie Taylor	5 ft 10 in (1.78 m)	So	Copper Hills High School	West Jordan, Utah
G/F	20	Merceius Mili	6 ft 1 in (1.85 m)	Fr	Skyridge High School	Lehi, Utah
G	21	Kaylee Borden	5 ft 6 in (1.68 m)	RS Sr	Nevada	Anadarko, Oklahoma
F	22	Rose Boisnel	6 ft 1 in (1.85 m)	Fr	ESB Villeneuve-d'Ascq	Caen, France
F	24	Lauren Crocker	6 ft 4 in (1.93 m)	Jr	Utah State	Calgary, Alberta
F	25	Annalyse Shimada	6 ft 0 in (1.83 m)	Fr	Cedar High School	Kanarraville, Utah

Head coach

- JD Gustin (Montana Western)

Assistant coach(es)

- Alan Nakamura (San Diego State)
- Breaunna Gillen (Utah Tech)
- Emily Chamberlain (Utah Tech)
- Taylia Stimpson (Utah Tech)

Legend

- (C) Team captain
- (S) Suspended
- (I) Ineligible
- (W) Walk-on
- Injured
- Current redshirt

Roster
Last update: January 27, 2026

== Schedule and results ==
Date time, TV	Rank^{#}	Opponent^{#}	Result	Record	High points	High rebounds	High assists	Site (attendance) city, state
Non-conference regular season
November 3, 2025*; 11:00 am, ESPN+		Westcliff	Canceled					Burns Arena; St. George, UT
November 8, 2025*; 2:00 pm, ESPN+		Northern Arizona	W 78–73	1–0	21 – Borden	8 – Dallas	4 – Hartley	Burns Arena (436); St. George, UT
November 12, 2025*; 7:00 pm, ESPN+		Omaha	W 62–56	2–0	13 – Borden	10 – Crittendon	4 – Hartley	Burns Arena (552); St. George, UT
November 15, 2025*; 2:00 pm, ESPN+		at Weber State	L 76–82	2–1	21 – Borden	11 – Borden	2 – Tied	Dee Events Center (512); Ogden, UT
November 22, 2025*; 7:00 pm, ESPN+		Portland State	W 71–63	3–1	25 – Borden	11 – Cofer	4 – Hartley	Burns Arena (572); St. George, UT
November 25, 2025*; 6:30 pm, ESPN+		at Arizona State	L 54−81	3−2	14 – Mad. Warren	10 – Crittendon	8 – Hartley	Desert Financial Arena (2,227); Tempe, AZ
November 29, 2025*; 12:00 pm, ESPN+		Westminster	W 81−70	4−2	25 – Borden	13 – Crittendon	6 – Hartley	Burns Arena (613); St. George, UT
December 2, 2025*; 7:00 pm, ESPN+		McNeese	L 52–67	4–3	15 – Crittendon	10 – Crittendon	3 – Hartley	Burns Arena (616); St. George, UT
December 6, 2025*; 2:00 pm, ESPN+		New Mexico State	L 55–58	4–4	22 – Borden	11 – Cofer	3 – Mad. Warren	Burns Arena (538); St. George, UT
December 13, 2025*; 2:00 pm, ESPN+		UC Santa Barbara	L 65–68	4–5	17 – Crittendon	9 – Crittendon	7 – Hartley	Burns Arena (537); St. George, UT
December 17, 2025*; 2:00 pm, ESPN+		Chicago State	W 69–55	5–5	16 – Crittendon	8 – Tied	8 – Hartley	Burns Arena (495); St. George, UT
WAC regular season
December 29, 2025; 6:30 pm, ESPN+		at Southern Utah	L 60–78	5–6 (0–1)	18 – Cofer	9 – Crocker	5 – Borden	America First Event Center (405); Cedar City, UT
January 1, 2026; 2:00 pm, ESPN+		Abilene Christian	L 51−81	5−7 (0–2)	17 – Mad. Warren	7 – Tied	7 – Hartley	Burns Arena (837); St. George, UT
January 8, 2026; 7:00 pm, ESPN+		California Baptist	L 67–75	5–8 (0–3)	16 – Mad. Warren	8 – Crittendon	5 – Hartley	Burns Arena (512); St. George, UT
January 10, 2026; 2:00 pm, ESPN+		Utah Valley	W 65–54	6–8 (1–3)	14 – Borden	9 – Borden	6 – Hartley	Burns Arena (579); St. George, UT
January 15, 2026; 5:30 pm, ESPN+		at UT Arlington	L 56–64	6–9 (1–4)	23 – Borden	6 – Tied	4 – Borden	College Park Center (761); Arlington, TX
January 17, 2026; 12:00 pm, ESPN+		at Tarleton State	L 60–64	6–10 (1–5)	12 – Tied	7 – Crocker	5 – Hartley	EECU Center (772); Stephenville, TX
January 22, 2026; 7:00 pm, ESPN+		California Baptist	L 61–67	6–11 (1–6)	23 – Borden	9 – Crocker	4 – Borden	Burns Arena (580); St. George, UT
January 24, 2026; 2:00 pm, ESPN+		at Southern Utah	L 49–62	6–12 (1–7)	13 – Crocker	9 – Crocker	4 – Hartley	America First Event Center (560); Cedar City, UT
January 29, 2026; 7:00 pm, ESPN+		Abilene Christian	L 46-54	6-13 (1-8)	18 – Cofer	10 – Crocker	5 – Hartley	Burns Arena (597); St. George, UT
January 31, 2026; 2:00 pm, ESPN+		Tarleton State	L 45-63	6-14 (1-9)	15 – Crittendon	12 – Crocker	5 – Hartley	Burns Arena (307); St. George, UT
February 5, 2026; 5:30 pm, ESPN+		at UT Arlington	L 78-84 ^{2 OT}	6-15 (1-10)	23 – Crittendon	13 – Cofer	9 – Hartley	College Park Center (562); Arlington, TX
February 12, 2026; 6:00 pm, ESPN+		at Utah Valley	L 55-58	6-16 (1-11)	18 – Crittendon	15 – Crocker	8 – Hartley	Lockhart Arena (761); Orem, UT
February 14, 2026; 2:00 pm, ESPN+		at California Baptist	L 70-82	6-17 (1-12)	20 – Crittendon	9 – Crittendon	5 – Hartley	Fowler Events Center (437); Riverside, CA
February 18, 2026; 7:00 pm, ESPN+		UT Arlington	W 60-58	7-17 (2-12)	29 – Borden	9 – Crocker	4 – Hartley	Burns Arena (588); St. George, UT
February 21, 2026; 1:00 pm, ESPN+		Tarleton State	W 76-55	8-17 (3-12)	23 – Crittendon	11 – Cofer	7 – Hartley	Burns Arena (579); St. George, UT
February 26, 2026; 5:00 pm, ESPN+		at Abilene Christian	L 66-76	8-18 (3-13)	15 – Crocker	11 – Crocker	7 – Hartley	Moody Coliseum (1,283); Abilene, TX
February 28, 2026; 2:00 pm, ESPN+		Southern Utah	W 83-66	9-18 (4-13)	19 – Cofer	17 – Crocker	4 – Tied	Burns Arena (746); St. George, UT
March 7, 2026; 2:00 pm, ESPN+		at Utah Valley	L 59-71	9-19 (4-14)	24 – Borden	9 – Borden	5 – Hartley	UCCU Center (1,076); Orem, UT
WAC tournament
March 11, 2026; 4:00 pm, ESPN+	(7)	vs. (6) UT Arlington; First Round	L 73-77	9-20	17 – Crocker	8 – Tied	7 – Hartley	Orleans Arena; Paradise, NV
*Non-conference game. ^{#}Rankings from AP Poll. (#) Tournament seedings in parentheses. All times are in Mountain.
