= 2025–26 Utah Valley Wolverines women's basketball team =

Intercollegiate basketball season

2025–26 Utah Valley Wolverines women's basketball

WNIT, First Round
- Conference: Western Athletic Conference
- Record: 16–15 (9–9 WAC)
- Head coach: Dan Nielson (7th season)
- Assistant coaches: Michael Shreeve (4th season); McKenzie Mangino (2nd season); Jasmine Porter (2nd season)
- Home arena: UCCU Center (Capacity: 8,500); Lockhart Arena (Capacity: 2,000)

2025–26 WAC women's basketball standings
	Conf.				Overall
Team	W		L	PCT	W		L	PCT
California Baptist †	15	–	3	.833	23	–	11	.676
Abilene Christian	13	–	5	.722	24	–	11	.686
Southern Utah	11	–	7	.611	19	–	13	.594
Utah Valley	9	–	9	.500	16	–	15	.516
Tarleton	7	–	11	.389	14	–	17	.452
UT Arlington	4	–	14	.222	12	–	21	.364
Utah Tech	4	–	14	.222	9	–	20	.310
† 2026 WAC tournament winner

The 2025–26 Utah Valley Wolverines women's basketball team represents Utah Valley University (UVU) in the 2025–26 NCAA Division I women's basketball season. Dan Nielson entered the season as head coach for his seventh season. The Wolverines play their home games at the UCCU Center and Lockhart Arena in Orem, Utah as members of the Western Athletic Conference (WAC).

This will be UVU's last season in the WAC. The Big West Conference announced on June 4, 2025 that UVU would join that conference in July 2026.

== Previous season ==
The Wolverines finished the 2024–25 season 19–13, 9–7 in WAC play, to finish tied for fourth place. As the No. 5 seed in the WAC Tournament, they defeated Abilene Christian in the quarterfinals 75–65, but then lost to Grand Canyon in the semifinals 84–55. The team was subsequently invited to participate in the 2025 Women's National Invitation Tournament where they defeated Air Force 70–64 in round 1, but later lost to Washington State 57–54 in round 2.

== Offseason ==
=== Departures ===
Name	Position	Height	Year	Reason for departure
Ally Criddle	G	5" 8"	Senior	Graduated
Danja Stafford Collins	F	6' 1"	Senior	Graduated
Tahlia White	G	6' 0"	Senior	Graduated
Abby Hendricks	G	5' 6"	Sophomore	Entered transfer portal
Aspen Caldwell	G	5' 7"	Sophomore	Transferred to Idaho State
Kendra Kitchen	F	6' 1"	Sophomore	LDS mission in Peru (per personal social media)

=== Incoming transfers ===
Name	Position	Height	Year	Previous school
Naia Tanuvasa	G	5" 10"	Sophomore	BYU
Kaylee Headrick	F	5' 10"	Senior	Colorado State
Evie Leeson	F	6' 2"	Redshirt Freshman	Alaska Anchorage
Gaby Goo	F	6' 0"	Sophomore	USU-Eastern

== Roster ==
2025–26 Utah Valley Wolverines women's basketball team
Players
Coaches

Pos.	#	Name	Height	Year	Previous school	Hometown
G	1	Kylee Mabry	5 ft 11 in (1.8 m)	Sr	Davis High School	Kaysville, UT
G	2	Anna Shreeve	5 ft 8 in (1.73 m)	Fr	San Juan Hills HS	Ladera Ranch, CA
G/F	3	Amanda Barcello	5 ft 11 in (1.8 m)	RS Jr	Seton Catholic High School BYU	Chandler, AZ
G	4	Kennedy "KJ" Carlyle	6 ft 2 in (1.88 m)	So	Cedar Park High School	Cedar Park, TX
G	5	Cambree Blackham	5 ft 7 in (1.7 m)	So	Skyridge High School	Lehi, UT
G	10	Saige Gibb	5 ft 10 in (1.78 m)	RS Jr	Timpview High School	Raymond, AB
F	12	Gaby Goo	6 ft 0 in (1.83 m)	So	Orem; USU Eastern	Orem, UT
F	14	Kaylee Headrick	5 ft 10 in (1.78 m)	Sr	Westlake High School; Colorado State	Bluffdale, UT
F	15	Evie Leeson	6 ft 2 in (1.88 m)	RS Fr	St Margaret's College; Alaska Anchorage	Christchurch, New Zealand
G	21	Naia Tanuvasa	5 ft 10 in (1.78 m)	So	Lone Peak HS; BYU	Highland, UT
G/F	25	Halle Nelson	6 ft 1 in (1.85 m)	RS Sr	American Fork High School; Utah State	American Fork, UT
C	34	Tessa Chaney	6 ft 3 in (1.91 m)	Jr	Westlake High School	Saratoga Springs, UT
C	44	Gracie Sorenson	6 ft 4 in (1.93 m)	Jr	Syracuse High School; Eastern Arizona	Syracuse, UT

Head coach

- Dan Nielson (BYU)

Assistant coach(es)

- Michael Shreeve (BYU)
- McKenzie Mangino (Hawaiʻi–Hilo)
- Jasmine Porter (Utah State)

Strength and conditioning coach(es)

- Josh Morzelewski (Utah)

Athletic trainer(s)

- Aaron Leavitt

Legend

- (C) Team captain
- (S) Suspended
- (I) Ineligible
- (W) Walk-on
- Injured
- Current redshirt

Roster
Last update: October 31, 2025

== Schedule and results ==
Date time, TV	Rank^{#}	Opponent^{#}	Result	Record	High points	High rebounds	High assists	Site (attendance) city, state
Non-conference regular season
November 3, 2025*; 7:30pm, ESPN+		at CSU Bakersfield	W 66–42	1–0	18 – Nelson	9 – Nelson	5 – Mabry	Icardo Center (134); Bakersfield, CA
November 5, 2025*; 6:00pm, ESPN+		at Loyola Marymount	W 64–60	2–0	13 – Chaney	5 – Tied	7 – Blackham	Gersten Pavilion (287); Los Angeles, CA
November 11, 2025*; 7:00pm, ESPN+		at Utah	L 52–75	2–1	18 – Headrick	12 – Nelson	2 – Tied	Jon M. Huntsman Center (2,167); Salt Lake City, UT
November 14, 2025*; 6:00pm, ESPN+		Pepperdine	W 85–56	3–1	19 – Barcello	8 – Nelson	6 – Blackham	UCCU Center (581); Orem, UT
November 17, 2025*; 6:00pm, ESPN+		Benedictine	W 74–34	4–1	15 – Barcello	7 – Tied	5 – Blackham	UCCU Center (671); Orem, UT
November 20, 2025*; 6:00pm, ESPN+		Weber State	W 59–55	5–1	17 – Blackham	9 – Headrick	3 – Tied	UCCU Center (520); Orem, UT
November 24, 2025*; 7:30pm, Mountain West Network		at Nevada	L 42–71	5–2	13 – Chaney	5 – Blackham	4 – Nelson	Lawlor Events Center (1,244); Reno, NV
December 6, 2025*; 2:00pm, ESPN+		Air Force	L 50–58	5–3	17 – Barcello	12 – Chaney	4 – Headrick	UCCU Center (539); Orem, UT
December 13, 2025*; 12:00pm, Summit League Network		at Kansas City	W 64–58	6–3	18 – Headrick	11 – Headrick	9 – Blackham	Swinney Recreation Center (301); Kansas City, MO
December 16, 2025*; 6:00pm, ESPN+		La Sierra	W 97–48	7–3	16 – Carlyle	6 – Leeson	8 – Blackham	UCCU Center (492); Orem, UT
December 20, 2025*; 12:00pm, ESPN+		Idaho State	L 56–59	7–4	14 – Gibb	6 – Tied	4 – Blackham	UCCU Center (1,316); Orem, UT
WAC Conference regular season
December 29, 2025; 7:00pm, ESPN+		at California Baptist	L 51–82	7–5 (0–1)	12 – Chaney	12 – Nelson	3 – Nelson	Fowler Events Center (358); Riverside, CA
January 1, 2026; 2:00pm, ESPN+		Tarleton	W 74–49	8–5 (1–1)	15 – Barcello	6 – Chaney	6 – Blackham	UCCU Center (648); Orem, UT
January 3, 2026; 2:00pm, ESPN+		Abilene Christian	W 69–67	9–5 (2–1)	23 – Tied	7 – Chaney	6 – Blackham	UCCU Center (544); Orem, UT
January 8, 2026; 6:30pm, ESPN+		at Southern Utah	L 68–76	9–6 (2–2)	21 – Barcello	7 – Nelson	3 – Blackham	America First Event Center (559); Cedar City, UT
January 10, 2026; 2:00pm, ESPN+		at Utah Tech; Old Hammer Rivalry	L 54–65	9–7 (2–3)	16 – Mabry	6 – Nelson	3 – Gibb	Burns Arena (579); St. George, UT
January 17, 2026; 1:00pm, ESPN+		at UT Arlington	L 47–59	9–8 (2–4)	17 – Blackham	7 – Gibb	3 – Blackham	College Park Center (473); Arlington, TX
January 22, 2026; 6:00pm, ESPN+		Southern Utah	L 60–64	9–9 (2–5)	15 – Headrick	5 – Tied	4 – Blackham	UCCU Center (1,113); Orem, UT
January 24, 2026; 2:00pm, ESPN+		California Baptist	L 75–85	9–10 (2–6)	31 – Barcello	8 – Headrick	6 – Blackham	UCCU Center (681); Orem, UT
January 29, 2026; 6:00pm, ESPN+		Tarleton	W 70–67	10–10 (3–6)	17 – Barcello	8 – Headrick	5 – Blackham	Lockhart Arena (679); Orem, UT
February 5, 2026; 5:00pm, ESPN+		at Abilene Christian	L 50–70	10–11 (3–7)	9 – Tied	8 – Nelson	5 – Blackham	Moody Coliseum (799); Abilene, TX
February 7, 2026; 1:00pm, ESPN+		at UT Arlington	L 59–60 ^{OT}	10–12 (3–8)	19 – Blackham	10 – Headrick	4 – Mabry	College Park Center (613); Arlington, TX
February 12, 2026; 6:00pm, ESPN+		Utah Tech	W 58–55	11–12 (4–8)	14 – Headrick	10 – Nelson	6 – Blackham	Lockhart Arena (761); Orem, UT
February 19, 2026; 7:00pm, ESPN+		at California Baptist	W 63–61	12–12 (5–8)	17 – Sorenson	7 – Headrick	8 – Blackham	Fowler Events Center (559); Riverside, CA
February 21, 2026; 2:00pm, ESPN+		UT Arlington	W 77–60	13–12 (6–8)	25 – Barcello	12 – Nelson	8 – Nelson	UCCU Center (584); Orem, UT
February 26, 2026; 8:00pm, ESPN+		at Tarleton	W 65–51	14–12 (7–8)	19 – Tied	10 – Headrick	2 – Tied	EECU Center (701); Stephenville, TX
February 28, 2026; 12:00pm, ESPN+		at Abilene Christian	L 57–58	14–13 (7–9)	13 – Barcello	8 – Nelson	4 – Blackham	Moody Coliseum (1,127); Abilene, TX
March 5, 2026; 6:00pm, ESPN+		Southern Utah	W 74–53	15–13 (8–9)	17 – Headrick	6 – Headrick	5 – Tied	UCCU Center (761); Orem, UT
March 7, 2026; 2:00pm, ESPN+		Utah Tech; Old Hammer Rivalry	W 71–59	16–13 (9–9)	17 – Mabry	8 – Tied	6 – Nelson	UCCU Center (1,076); Orem, UT
WAC tournament
March 12, 2026; 1:00pm, ESPN+	(4)	vs. (5) Tarleton; Quarterfinals	L 57–60	16–14	17 – Headrick	7 – Tied	7 – Blackham	Orleans Arena (786); Paradise, NV
WNIT
March 19, 2026; 7:00pm, ESPN+		at San Francisco; Round 1	L 50–80	16–15	16 – Blackham	9 – Headrick	3 – Headrick	Sobrato Center (180); San Francisco, CA
*Non-conference game. ^{#}Rankings from AP poll. (#) Tournament seedings in parentheses. All times are in Mountain.

== See also ==
- 2025–26 Utah Valley Wolverines men's basketball team
