= 2025–26 Southern Utah Thunderbirds women's basketball team =

American college basketball season

2025–26 Southern Utah Thunderbirds women's basketball

WNIT, Second Round
- Conference: Western Athletic Conference
- Record: 19–13 (11–7 WAC)
- Head coach: Tracy Mason (8th season)
- Associate head coach: Allyson Fasnacht
- Assistant coaches: Jay Johnson; Advit Raghavan; Tamia Braggs
- Home arena: America First Event Center

2025–26 WAC women's basketball standings
	Conf.				Overall
Team	W		L	PCT	W		L	PCT
California Baptist †	15	–	3	.833	23	–	11	.676
Abilene Christian	13	–	5	.722	24	–	10	.706
Southern Utah	11	–	7	.611	19	–	13	.594
Utah Valley	9	–	9	.500	16	–	15	.516
Tarleton	7	–	11	.389	14	–	17	.452
UT Arlington	4	–	14	.222	12	–	21	.364
Utah Tech	4	–	14	.222	9	–	20	.310
† 2026 WAC tournament winner As of March 24, 2026

The 2025–26 Southern Utah Thunderbirds women's basketball team represents Southern Utah University during the 2025–26 NCAA Division I women's basketball season. The Thunderbirds, led by eighth-year head coach Tracy Mason, play their home games at America First Event Center in Cedar City, Utah as members of the Western Athletic Conference.

This will be Southern Utah's final season as members of the WAC, as they will be joining the Big Sky Conference, effective July 1, 2026.

== Previous season ==
The Thunderbirds finished the 2024–25 season 9–21, 7–9 in WAC play, to finish in seventh place. They were defeated by Tarleton State in the quarterfinals of the WAC tournament.

== Preseason ==
On October 29, 2025, the Western Athletic Conference released their preseason poll. Southern Utah was picked to finish seventh (last) in the conference.

=== Preseason rankings ===
WAC Preseason Poll
Place	Team	Votes
1	Abilene Christian	32 (2)
2	California Baptist	31 (4)
3	UT Arlington	25 (1)
4	Utah Valley	23
5	Tarleton State	18
6	Utah Tech	12
7	Southern Utah	6
(#) first-place votes

=== Preseason All-WAC Team ===
No players were named to the Preseason All-WAC Team.

== Roster ==
2025–26 Southern Utah Thunderbirds women's basketball team
Players
Coaches

Pos.	#	Name	Height	Year	Previous school	Hometown
G	1	Kortney Doman	5 ft 10 in (1.78 m)	So	Crane High School	Crane, Oregon
G	2	Bella Hasan	5 ft 6 in (1.68 m)	So	Kamiak High School	Mukilteo, Washington
G	3	Sierra Chambers	5 ft 8 in (1.73 m)	So	San Ramon Valley High School	Danville, California
F	4	Brooklyn Fely	6 ft 0 in (1.83 m)	Jr	Umpqua Community College	Orem, Utah
G	5	Charli Kay	5 ft 9 in (1.75 m)	Jr	Marist Regional College	Smithton, Australia
G	11	Morgan Trigueiro	5 ft 10 in (1.78 m)	Jr	College of the Sequoias	Caruthers, California
C	13	Ashley Banks	6 ft 5 in (1.96 m)	Sr	Boise High School	Boise, Idaho
C	15	Nike Borg	6 ft 3 in (1.91 m)	Fr	RIG Mark Club	Stockholm, Sweden
F	20	Emily Scholtes	6 ft 1 in (1.85 m)	RS Fr	Lavalla Catholic College	Traralgon, Australia
G	22	Devyn Kiernan	5 ft 11 in (1.8 m)	Fr	Mater Dei High School	Orange, California
G	33	Vallory Kuelker	5 ft 8 in (1.73 m)	Fr	Pinewood School	Boulder Creek, California
F	34	Denver Anderson	6 ft 1 in (1.85 m)	So	Mount Zion High School	Mount Zion, Illinois
F	35	Olivia Malafu	6 ft 0 in (1.83 m)	So	Kapaa High School	Kapaʻa, Hawaii
F	44	Ava Uhrich	6 ft 0 in (1.83 m)	Jr	Pinewood School	Burlingame, California

Head coach

- Tracy Mason (Saint Mary's)

Assistant coach(es)

- Allyson Fasnacht (Liberty)
- Jay Johnson (Saint Mary's)
- Advit Raghavan (Puget Sound)
- Tamia Braggs (Santa Clara)

Legend

- (C) Team captain
- (S) Suspended
- (I) Ineligible
- (W) Walk-on
- Injured
- Current redshirt

Roster
Last update: January 25, 2026

== Schedule and results ==
Date time, TV	Rank^{#}	Opponent^{#}	Result	Record	High points	High rebounds	High assists	Site (attendance) city, state
Non-conference regular season
November 3, 2025*; 6:30 pm, ESPN+		Park–Gilbert	W 103–55	1–0	21 – Tied	11 – Tied	4 – Kiernan	America First Event Center (366); Cedar City, UT
November 8, 2025*; 2:00 pm, ESPN+		Washington State	W 77–64	2–0	20 – Fely	13 – Fely	6 – Chambers	America First Event Center (423); Cedar City, UT
November 13, 2025*; 7:00 pm, ESPN+		at Eastern Washington	W 74–68	3–0	18 – Chambers	14 – Tied	3 – Tied	Reese Court (500); Cheney, WA
November 15, 2025*; 3:00 pm, ESPN+		at Idaho	L 72–76	3–1	19 – Chambers	17 – Uhrich	5 – Chambers	ICCU Arena (396); Moscow, ID
November 18, 2025*; 6:30 pm, ESPN+		Benedictine Mesa	W 91−68	4−1	12 – Fely	6 – Fely	5 – Kiernan	America First Event Center (313); Cedar City, UT
November 21, 2025*; 7:00 pm, ESPN+		at Cal Poly	W 85−80 ^{OT}	5−1	22 – Kiernan	10 – Uhrich	3 – Kiernan	Mott Athletics Center (441); San Luis Obispo, CA
November 29, 2025*; 2:00 pm, ESPN+		Nelson AIC	W 111–41	6–1	20 – Trigueiro	9 – Uhrich	7 – Chambers	America First Event Center (236); Cedar City, UT
December 4, 2025*; 12:00 pm, ESPN+		New Mexico State	W 69–59	7–1	28 – Chambers	13 – Uhrich	7 – Chambers	America First Event Center (831); Cedar City, UT
December 7, 2025*; 1:00 pm, MWN		at Colorado State	L 47–70	7–2	16 – Fely	14 – Fely	4 – Doman	Moby Arena (1,662); Fort Collins, CO
December 13, 2025*; 1:00 pm, MWN		at Boise State	L 66–81	7–3	19 – Chambers	16 – Uhrich	3 – Banks	ExtraMile Arena (1,749); Boise, ID
December 20, 2025*; 2:00 pm		vs. Omaha; LMU Christmas Tournament	W 80–47	8–3	23 – Uhrich	8 – Tied	7 – Chambers	Gersten Pavilion (102); Los Angeles, CA
December 21, 2025*; 3:30 pm, ESPN+		at Loyola Marymount; LMU Christmas Tournament	L 68−76	8−4	26 – Uhrich	9 – Banks	6 – Uhrich	Gersten Pavilion; Los Angeles, CA
WAC regular season
December 29, 2025; 6:30 pm, ESPN+		Utah Tech	W 78–60	9–4 (1–0)	19 – Chambers	12 – Fely	5 – Uhrich	America First Event Center (405); Cedar City, UT
January 3, 2026; 1:00 pm, ESPN+		at UT Arlington	W 58–55	10–4 (2–0)	19 – Uhrich	10 – Fely	5 – Fely	College Park Center (721); Arlington, TX
January 8, 2026; 6:30 pm, ESPN+		Utah Valley	W 76–68	11–4 (3–0)	20 – Uhrich	16 – Uhrich	5 – Uhrich	America First Event Center (559); Cedar City, UT
January 10, 2026; 2:00 pm, ESPN+		California Baptist	L 77–82 ^{OT}	11–5 (3–1)	20 – Chambers	17 – Uhrich	9 – Chambers	America First Event Center (469); Cedar City, UT
January 15, 2026; 6:00 pm, ESPN+		at Tarleton State	L 55–81	11–6 (3–2)	16 – Chambers	15 – Uhrich	2 – Tied	EECU Center (878); Stephenville, TX
January 17, 2026; 12:00 pm, ESPN+		at Abilene Christian	L 54–82	11–7 (3–3)	18 – Fely	8 – Tied	4 – Doman	Moody Coliseum (846); Abilene, TX
January 22, 2026; 6:00 pm, ESPN+		at Utah Valley	W 64–60	12–7 (4–3)	16 – Chambers	12 – Uhrich	4 – Tied	UCCU Center (1,113); Orem, UT
January 24, 2026; 2:00 pm, ESPN+		Utah Tech	W 62–49	13–7 (5–3)	19 – Fely	18 – Uhrich	2 – Tied	America First Event Center (560); Cedar City, UT
January 29, 2026; 6:30 pm, ESPN+		UT Arlington	W 77-68	14-7 (6-3)	30 – Uhrich	11 – Doman	6 – Chambers	America First Event Center (441); Cedar City, UT
January 31, 2026; 2:00 pm, ESPN+		Abilene Christian	W 71-68	15-7 (7-3)	26 – Fely	17 – Fely	7 – Chambers	America First Event Center (461); Cedar City, UT
February 7, 2026; 1:00 pm, ESPN+		at Tarleton State	L 57-59	15-8 (7-4)	16 – Kiernan	8 – Tied	3 – Tied	EECU Center (747); Stephenville, TX
February 12, 2026; 7:00 pm, ESPN+		at California Baptist	W 85-70	16-8 (8-4)	31 – Fely	13 – Fely	6 – Chambers	Fowler Events Center (501); Riverside, CA
February 14, 2026; 2:00 pm, ESPN+		UT Arlington	W 78-67	17-8 (9-4)	23 – Chambers	11 – Fely	5 – Chambers	America First Event Center (392); Cedar City, UT
February 18, 2026; 6:30 pm, ESPN+		Tarleton State	W 76-69	18-8 (10-4)	24 – Uhrich	10 – Uhrich	6 – Uhrich	America First Event Center (345); Cedar City, UT
February 22, 2026; 2:00 pm, ESPN+		Abilene Christian	W 78-70	19-8 (11-4)	26 – Uhrich	13 – Uhrich	5 – Doman	America First Event Center (439); Cedar City, UT
February 28, 2026; 2:00 pm, ESPN+		at Utah Tech	L 66-83	19-9 (11-5)	16 – Chambers	11 – Fely	4 – Fely	Burns Arena (746); St. George, UT
March 5, 2026; 6:00 pm, ESPN+		at Utah Valley	L 53-74	19-10 (11-6)	13 – Tied	13 – Doman	4 – Tied	UCCU Center (761); Orem, UT
March 7, 2026; 2:00 pm, ESPN+		at California Baptist	L 61-77	19-11 (11-7)	22 – Uhrich	15 – Uhrich	3 – Tied	Fowler Events Center (731); Riverside, CA
WAC tournament
March 12, 2026; 3:30 pm, ESPN+	(3)	vs. (6) UT Arlington; Quarterfinals	L 65–70	19–12	13 – Tied	10 – Banks	4 – Chambers	Orleans Arena (786); Paradise, NV
WNIT
March 22, 2026*; 2:00 pm, ESPN+		at Pepperdine; Second Round	L 80–85	19–13	29 – Uhrich	15 – Uhrich	5 – Fely	Firestone Fieldhouse (352); Malibu, CA
*Non-conference game. ^{#}Rankings from AP Poll. (#) Tournament seedings in parentheses. All times are in Mountain.
