= 2025–26 Tarleton State Texans women's basketball team =

American college basketball season

2025–26 Tarleton State Texans women's basketball
- Conference: Western Athletic Conference
- Record: 14–17 (7–11 WAC)
- Head coach: Bill Brock (3rd season)
- Associate head coach: Geoff Golden
- Assistant coaches: Monique Whaley-Briggs; Gee Lawler; Brooks White; Kelsey Ground
- Home arena: EECU Center

2025–26 WAC women's basketball standings
	Conf.				Overall
Team	W		L	PCT	W		L	PCT
California Baptist †	15	–	3	.833	23	–	10	.697
Abilene Christian	13	–	5	.722	23	–	10	.697
Southern Utah	11	–	7	.611	19	–	12	.613
Utah Valley	9	–	9	.500	16	–	15	.516
Tarleton	7	–	11	.389	13	–	16	.448
UT Arlington	4	–	14	.222	12	–	21	.364
Utah Tech	4	–	14	.222	9	–	20	.310
† 2026 WAC tournament winner As of March 19, 2026

The 2025–26 Tarleton State Texans women's basketball team represents Tarleton State University during the 2025–26 NCAA Division I women's basketball season. The Texans, led by third-year head coach Bill Brock, play their home games at the newly opened EECU Center in Stephenville, Texas, as members of the Western Athletic Conference.

== Previous season ==
The Texans finished the 2024–25 season 20–14, 10–6 in WAC play, to finish in a tie for second place. They defeated Southern Utah, before falling to UT Arlington in the semifinals of the WAC tournament. They received an automatic bid to the WNIT, where they would be defeated by Lindenwood in the second round.

== Preseason ==
On October 29, 2025, the Western Athletic Conference released their preseason poll. Tarleton State was picked to finish fifth in the conference.

=== Preseason rankings ===
WAC Preseason Poll
Place	Team	Votes
1	Abilene Christian	32 (2)
2	California Baptist	31 (4)
3	UT Arlington	25 (1)
4	Utah Valley	23
5	Tarleton State	18
6	Utah Tech	12
7	Southern Utah	6
(#) first-place votes

=== Preseason All-WAC Team ===
Preseason All-WAC Team
Player	Year	Position
Jakoriah Long	Senior	Guard

== Roster ==
2025–26 Tarleton State Texans women's basketball team
Players
Coaches

Pos.	#	Name	Height	Year	Previous school	Hometown
G	1	Mar'Cyah Willis	5 ft 7 in (1.7 m)	So	La Vega High School	Waco, Texas
G/F	2	Kyriana Jones	5 ft 10 in (1.78 m)	Sr	Dodge City Community College	Little Rock, Arkansas
G	4	Nyah Buntun	5 ft 4 in (1.63 m)	Fr	St. Mary's High School	Stockton, California
F	5	Tessa Engelman	6 ft 3 in (1.91 m)	Jr	Mount St. Mary's	Calgary, Alberta
G	6	Luka Malinka	5 ft 8 in (1.73 m)	Sr	Roosevelt	Rungsted, Denmark
F/C	7	Jailynn Brill	6 ft 3 in (1.91 m)	Jr	Chipola College	Lincoln, Nebraska
G	8	Kristian Hieskill	5 ft 11 in (1.8 m)	Fr	Byron P. Steele High School	Cibolo, Texas
G	11	Jakoriah Long	5 ft 7 in (1.7 m)	Sr	Blinn College	Waco, Texas
G	13	Gia Adams	5 ft 7 in (1.7 m)	Sr	North Texas	Cypress, Texas
G	15	Alexis Rynders	5 ft 11 in (1.8 m)	Fr	Glen Rose High School	Glen Rose, Texas
F	23	Shadasia Brackens	5 ft 11 in (1.8 m)	Jr	North Texas	Fairfield, Texas
G	24	Jaylynn Perez-Richard	5 ft 11 in (1.8 m)	Fr	Pearland Dawson High School	Houston, Texas
C	27	Elodie Lutbert	6 ft 6 in (1.98 m)	Fr	ESB Villeneuve-d'Ascq	Sainte-Luce, Martinique
G	30	Caroline Lyles	6 ft 0 in (1.83 m)	Jr	Akron	Argyle, Texas
F	32	Allie Myers	6 ft 1 in (1.85 m)	Jr	Seward County Community College	Carlsbad, New Mexico

Head coach

- Bill Brock (SE Oklahoma State)

Assistant coach(es)

- Geoff Golden (Texas State)
- Monique Whaley-Briggs (North Carolina Central)
- Gee Lawler (Texas A&M–Corpus Christi)
- Brooks White (Tarleton State)
- Kelsey Ground (Ozarks)

Legend

- (C) Team captain
- (S) Suspended
- (I) Ineligible
- (W) Walk-on
- Injured
- Current redshirt

Roster
Last update: January 26, 2026

== Schedule and results ==
Date time, TV	Rank^{#}	Opponent^{#}	Result	Record	High points	High rebounds	High assists	Site (attendance) city, state
Exhibition
October 27, 2025*; 7:00 pm, ESPN+		Kansas State	L 57–78	–	19 – Long	5 – Tied	2 – Tied	EECU Center (1,312); Stephenville, TX
Non-conference regular season
November 3, 2025*; 7:00 pm, ESPN+		Schreiner	W 90–35	1–0	16 – Willis	11 – Brackens	3 – Tied	EECU Center (753); Stephenville, TX
November 7, 2025*; 11:00 am, ESPN+		Arkansas State	L 77–87 ^{OT}	1–1	20 – Brackens	9 – Brackens	6 – Adams	EECU Center (1,103); Stephenville, TX
November 9, 2025*; 2:00 pm, ESPN+		Houston Christian	W 75–71 ^{2OT}	2–1	21 – Malinka	10 – Long	3 – Engelman	EECU Center (723); Stephenville, TX
November 13, 2025*; 11:00 am, SECN+		at Texas A&M	L 64–79	2–2	21 – Adams	4 – Tied	3 – Long	Reed Arena (7,851); College Station, TX
November 16, 2025*; 2:00 pm, ESPN+		McNeese	L 47−49	2−3	14 – Lutbert	6 – Tied	3 – Engelman	EECU Center (953); Stephenville, TX
November 20, 2025*; 6:30 pm, ESPN+		at No. 10 TCU	L 32−80	2−4	7 – Lutbert	6 – Tied	2 – Tied	Schollmaier Arena (2,849); Fort Worth, TX
November 25, 2025*; 7:00 pm, ESPN+		at Texas State	W 56–45	3–4	16 – Tied	12 – Lutbert	5 – Adams	Strahan Arena (841); San Marcos, TX
December 2, 2025*; 7:00 pm		at Mississippi Valley State	W 66–50	4–4	16 – Long	11 – Brackens	4 – Long	Harrison HPER Complex (267); Itta Bena, MS
December 7, 2025*; 2:00 pm, ESPN+		Texas A&M–San Antonio	W 94–73	5–4	19 – Brackens	12 – Lutbert	7 – Adams	EECU Center (1,090); Stephenville, TX
December 19, 2025*; 7:30 pm, WAC International		vs. Buffalo; ACU Christmas Classic	W 70–65	6–4	23 – Adams	10 – Brackens	8 – Adams	Moody Coliseum (775); Abilene, TX
December 20, 2025*; 1:00 pm, WAC International		vs. Montana; ACU Christmas Classic	L 85–90 ^{OT}	6–5	22 – Adams	8 – Tied	8 – Adams	Moody Coliseum (123); Abilene, TX
WAC regular season
December 29, 2025; 7:00 pm, ESPN+		UT Arlington	W 66−57	7−5 (1–0)	14 – Brackens	11 – Brackens	3 – Tied	EECU Center (832); Stephenville, TX
January 1, 2026; 3:00 pm, ESPN+		at Utah Valley	L 49–74	7–6 (1–1)	9 – Brackens	7 – Lyles	3 – Tied	UCCU Center (648); Orem, UT
January 3, 2026; 3:00 pm, ESPN+		at California Baptist	L 68–80	7–7 (1–2)	21 – Adams	5 – Tied	2 – Tied	Fowler Events Center (483); Riverside, CA
January 8, 2026; 6:00 pm, ESPN+		at Abilene Christian	L 59–64	7–8 (1–3)	21 – Brackens	9 – Brackens	4 – Long	Moody Coliseum (593); Abilene, TX
January 15, 2026; 7:00 pm, ESPN+		Southern Utah	W 81–55	8–8 (2–3)	20 – Adams	14 – Lutbert	5 – Adams	EECU Center (878); Stephenville, TX
January 17, 2026; 1:00 pm, ESPN+		Utah Tech	W 64–60	9–8 (3–3)	17 – Long	13 – Brackens	5 – Adams	EECU Center (772); Stephenville, TX
January 21, 2026; 7:00 pm, ESPN+		UT Arlington	W 51–37	10–8 (4–3)	12 – Adams	16 – Lutbert	7 – Adams	EECU Center (802); Stephenville, TX
January 26, 2026; 6:00 pm, ESPN+		at Abilene Christian						Moody Coliseum; Abilene, TX
January 29, 2026; 7:00 pm, ESPN+		at Utah Valley						Lockhart Arena; Orem, UT
January 31, 2026; 3:00 pm, ESPN+		at Utah Tech						Burns Arena; St. George, UT
February 5, 2026; 7:00 pm, ESPN+		California Baptist						EECU Center; Stephenville, TX
February 7, 2026; 2:00 pm, ESPN+		Southern Utah						EECU Center; Stephenville, TX
February 14, 2026; 2:00 pm, ESPN+		Abilene Christian						EECU Center; Stephenville, TX
February 18, 2026; 7:30 pm, ESPN+		at Southern Utah						America First Event Center; Cedar City, UT
February 21, 2026; 2:00 pm, ESPN+		at Utah Tech						Burns Arena; St. George, UT
February 26, 2026; 7:00 pm, ESPN+		Utah Valley						EECU Center; Stephenville, TX
February 28, 2026; 2:00 pm, ESPN+		California Baptist						EECU Center; Stephenville, TX
March 5, 2026; 6:30 pm, ESPN+		at UT Arlington						College Park Center; Arlington, TX
WAC tournament
March 11–14, 2026; ESPN+		vs.						Orleans Arena; Paradise, NV
*Non-conference game. ^{#}Rankings from AP Poll. (#) Tournament seedings in parentheses. All times are in Central.
