= 2025–26 Abilene Christian Wildcats women's basketball team =

American college basketball season

2025–26 Abilene Christian Wildcats women's basketball

WNIT, Super 16
- Conference: Western Athletic Conference
- Record: 24–11 (13–5 WAC)
- Head coach: Julie Goodenough (14th season)
- Assistant coaches: Yannick Denson; Tatum Veitenheimer; Chris Garcia; Malone Graham
- Home arena: Moody Coliseum

2025–26 WAC women's basketball standings
| | Conf. | | | | Overall |
| Team | W | | L | PCT | W | | L | PCT |
|---|---|---|---|---|---|---|---|---|
| California Baptist † | 15 | – | 3 | .833 | 23 | – | 11 | .676 |
| Abilene Christian | 13 | – | 5 | .722 | 24 | – | 11 | .686 |
| Southern Utah | 11 | – | 7 | .611 | 19 | – | 13 | .594 |
| Utah Valley | 9 | – | 9 | .500 | 16 | – | 15 | .516 |
| Tarleton | 7 | – | 11 | .389 | 14 | – | 17 | .452 |
| UT Arlington | 4 | – | 14 | .222 | 12 | – | 21 | .364 |
| Utah Tech | 4 | – | 14 | .222 | 9 | – | 20 | .310 |
† 2026 WAC tournament winner

The 2025–26 Abilene Christian Wildcats women's basketball team represented Abilene Christian University during the 2025–26 NCAA Division I women's basketball season. The Wildcats, led by 14th-year head coach Julie Goodenough, played their home games at Moody Coliseum in Abilene, Texas as members of the Western Athletic Conference.

== Previous season ==
The Wildcats finished the 2024–25 season 22–13, 9–7 in WAC play, to finish in a three-way tie for fourth place. They were defeated by Utah Valley in the quarterfinals of the WAC tournament. They received an at-large bid to the WNIT, where they defeated Northwestern State in the first round, and Central Arkansas in the second round, before falling to Illinois State in the Super 16.

== Preseason ==
On October 29, 2025, the Western Athletic Conference released their preseason poll. Abilene Christian was picked to finish atop the conference, with two first-place votes.

=== Preseason rankings ===
WAC Preseason Poll
| Place | Team | Votes |
|---|---|---|
| 1 | Abilene Christian | 32 (2) |
| 2 | California Baptist | 31 (4) |
| 3 | UT Arlington | 25 (1) |
| 4 | Utah Valley | 23 |
| 5 | Tarleton State | 18 |
| 6 | Utah Tech | 12 |
| 7 | Southern Utah | 6 |
(#) first-place votes

=== Preseason All-WAC Team ===
Preseason All-WAC Team
| Player | Year | Position |
|---|---|---|
| Payton Hull | Junior | Guard |
| Meredith Mayes | Junior | Center |

=== Preseason Player of the Year ===
Preseason Player of the Year
| Player | Year | Position |
|---|---|---|
| Payton Hull | Junior | Guard |

== Roster ==
2025–26 Abilene Christian Wildcats women's basketball team
Players
Coaches

| Pos. | # | Name | Height | Year | Previous school | Hometown |
|---|---|---|---|---|---|---|
| G | 0 | Molly Daugherty | 5 ft 10 in (1.78 m) | Fr | Summerville High School | Summerville, South Carolina |
| F | 1 | Emma Daugherty | 6 ft 1 in (1.85 m) | Fr | Summerville High School | Summerville, South Carolina |
| G | 2 | Natalia Chavez | 5 ft 11 in (1.8 m) | Sr | New Mexico | Cochiti Pueblo, New Mexico |
| G | 4 | Erin Woodson | 5 ft 10 in (1.78 m) | Jr | Purdue Fort Wayne | Richmond, Virginia |
| G | 5 | Breanna Davis | 5 ft 6 in (1.68 m) | Sr | North Texas | Waxahachie, Texas |
| G | 10 | Payton Hull | 5 ft 10 in (1.78 m) | Jr | Peaster High School | Peaster, Texas |
| G | 11 | Bree Riley | 5 ft 5 in (1.65 m) | Fr | Grand Oaks High School | Spring, Texas |
| C | 14 | Meredith Mayes | 6 ft 3 in (1.91 m) | Jr | Bixby High School | Bixby, Oklahoma |
| G | 15 | Jazmyn Stone | 5 ft 6 in (1.68 m) | RS Jr | Charleston | Federal Way, Washington |
| G | 21 | Riley Grohman | 5 ft 10 in (1.78 m) | Fr | Jim Ned High School | Tuscola, Texas |
| C | 23 | Jordyn Coleman | 6 ft 2 in (1.88 m) | Jr | Triton College | Zionsville, Indiana |
| F | 24 | Emma Troxell | 6 ft 0 in (1.83 m) | Jr | Bushland High School | Bushland, Texas |
| C | 41 | Aimee Flippen | 6 ft 4 in (1.93 m) | So | Glen Rose High School | Glen Rose, Texas |

Head coach

- Julie Goodenough (UT Arlington)

Assistant coach(es)

- Yannick Denson (Lamar)
- Tatum Veitenheimer (Texas Tech)
- Chris Garcia (Abilene Christian)
- Malone Graham (Texas Tech)

Legend

- (C) Team captain
- (S) Suspended
- (I) Ineligible
- (W) Walk-on
- Injured
- Current redshirt

Roster
Last update: January 23, 2026

== Schedule and results ==
| Date time, TV | Rank^{#} | Opponent^{#} | Result | Record | High points | High rebounds | High assists | Site (attendance) city, state |
Exhibition
| October 24, 2025*; 5:00 pm | | Houston Christian | W 76–48 | – | 14 – Mayes | – | – | Moody Coliseum; Abilene, TX |
Non-conference regular season
| November 3, 2025*; 5:30 pm, ESPN+ | | Howard Payne | W 103–33 | 1–0 | 16 – Hull | 6 – Troxell | 5 – Woodson | Moody Coliseum (1,002); Abilene, TX |
| November 7, 2025*; 6:00 pm, ESPN+ | | Incarnate Word | W 69–56 | 2–0 | 19 – Troxell | 9 – Troxell | 4 – Tied | Moody Coliseum (575); Abilene, TX |
| November 11, 2025*; 6:00 pm, ESPN+ | | UT Rio Grande Valley | W 76–58 | 3–0 | 20 – Chavez | 13 – Mayes | 7 – Davis | Moody Coliseum (1,080); Abilene, TX |
| November 14, 2025*; 5:30 pm, ESPN+ | | at Stephen F. Austin | L 76–77 | 3–1 | 22 – Hull | 10 – Troxell | 6 – Stone | William R. Johnson Coliseum (1,212); Nacogdoches, TX |
| November 19, 2025*; 11:00 am, ESPN+ | | at North Texas | W 60−51 | 4−1 | 16 – Hull | 9 – Mayes | 2 – Tied | The Super Pit (1,267); Denton, TX |
| November 28, 2025*; 10:00 am, Ion | | vs. Northwestern; Fort Myers Tip-Off Shell Division | L 59−62 | 4−2 | 13 – Troxell | 6 – Tied | 4 – Troxell | Suncoast Credit Union Arena; Fort Myers, FL |
| November 29, 2025*; 10:00 am, Ion | | vs. Bradley; Fort Myers Tip-Off Shell Division | L 74–80 | 4–3 | 23 – Hull | 9 – Mayes | 3 – Tied | Suncoast Credit Union Arena (593); Fort Myers, FL |
| December 2, 2025*; 11:00 am, ESPN+ | | McMurry | W 112–60 | 5–3 | 29 – Hull | 13 – Mayes | 7 – Davis | Moody Coliseum (1,500); Abilene, TX |
| December 6, 2025*; 2:30 pm, ESPN+ | | at East Texas A&M | W 72–55 | 6–3 | 19 – Mayes | 13 – Mayes | 4 – Tied | The Field House (239); Commerce, TX |
| December 14, 2025*; 2:00 pm, ESPN+ | | vs. Texas Tech | L 57–67 | 6–4 | 23 – Hull | 11 – Troxell | 2 – Tied | Odessa College Sports Center (1,300); Odessa, TX |
| December 19, 2025*; 5:30 pm, ESPN+ | | Montana; ACU Christmas Classic | W 60–48 | 7–4 | 24 – Mayes | 12 – Troxell | 3 – Woodson | Moody Coliseum (775); Abilene, TX |
| December 20, 2025*; 3:00 pm, ESPN+ | | Buffalo; ACU Christmas Classic | W 72−48 | 8−4 | 17 – Hull | 9 – Woodson | 4 – Davis | Moody Coliseum (877); Abilene, TX |
| December 29, 2025*; 1:00 pm, ESPN+ | | Nelson | W 112–54 | 9–4 | 23 – Hull | 7 – Woodson | 8 – Hull | Moody Coliseum (500); Abilene, TX |
WAC regular season
| January 1, 2026; 3:00 pm, ESPN+ | | at Utah Tech | W 81–51 | 10–4 (1–0) | 19 – Mayes | 10 – Mayes | 8 – Hull | Burns Arena (837); St. George, UT |
| January 3, 2026; 3:00 pm, ESPN+ | | at Utah Valley | L 67–69 | 10–5 (1–1) | 21 – Hull | 8 – Mayes | 5 – Hull | UCCU Center (544); Orem, UT |
| January 8, 2026; 6:00 pm, ESPN+ | | Tarleton State | W 64–59 | 11–5 (2–1) | 18 – Mayes | 9 – Woodson | 5 – Woodson | Moody Coliseum (593); Abilene, TX |
| January 10, 2026; 1:00 pm, ESPN+ | | UT Arlington | W 59–56 | 12–5 (3–1) | 21 – Woodson | 8 – Tied | 4 – Troxell | Moody Coliseum (712); Abilene, TX |
| January 15, 2026; 1:00 pm, ESPN+ | | at California Baptist | W 70–58 | 13–5 (4–1) | 23 – Woodson | 11 – Troxell | 7 – Davis | Fowler Events Center (4,157); Riverside, CA |
| January 17, 2026; 1:00 pm, ESPN+ | | Southern Utah | W 82–54 | 14–5 (5–1) | 21 – Hull | 9 – Woodson | 4 – Davis | Moody Coliseum (846); Abilene, TX |
| January 29, 2026; 8:00 pm, ESPN+ | | at Utah Tech | W 54-46 | 15-5 (6-1) | 12 – Chavez | 7 – Woodson | 4 – Davis | Burns Arena (597); St. George, UT |
| January 31, 2026; 3:00 pm, ESPN+ | | at Southern Utah | L 68-71 | 15-6 (6-2) | 21 – Hull | 10 – Troxell | 2 – Woodson | America First Event Center (461); Cedar City, UT |
| February 3, 2026; 6:00 pm, ESPN+ | | Tarleton State | W 68-65 | 16-6 (7-2) | 27 – Hull | 5 – Tied | 4 – Hull | Moody Coliseum (894); Abilene, TX |
| February 5, 2026; 6:00 pm, ESPN+ | | Utah Valley | W 70-50 | 17-6 (8-2) | 28 – Hull | 6 – Woodson | 4 – Troxell | Moody Coliseum (799); Abilene, TX |
| February 7, 2026; 1:00 pm, ESPN+ | | California Baptist | L 71-74 | 17-7 (8-3) | 22 – Troxell | 6 – Tied | 4 – Hull | Moody Coliseum (1,167); Abilene, TX |
| February 12, 2026; 6:30 pm, ESPN+ | | at UT Arlington | W 72-63 | 18-7 (9-3) | 24 – Hull | 6 – Tied | 5 – Troxell | College Park Center (810); Arlington, TX |
| February 14, 2026; 2:00 pm, ESPN+ | | at Tarleton State | W 72-67 | 19-7 (10-3) | 36 – Hull | 6 – Troxell | 2 – Tied | EECU Center (1,127); Stephenville, TX |
| February 22, 2026; 3:00 pm, ESPN+ | | at Southern Utah | L 70-78 | 19-8 (10-4) | 30 – Hull | 6 – Flippen | 4 – Davis | America First Event Center (439); Cedar City, UT |
| February 26, 2026; 6:00 pm, ESPN+ | | Utah Tech | W 76-66 | 20-8 (11-4) | 23 – Woodson | 14 – Woodson | 6 – Tied | Moody Coliseum (1,283); Abilene, TX |
| February 28, 2026; 1:00 pm, ESPN+ | | Utah Valley | W 58-57 | 21-8 (12-4) | 11 – Hull | 9 – Woodson | 6 – Woodson | Moody Coliseum (1,127); Abilene, TX |
| March 5, 2026; 6:00 pm, ESPN+ | | California Baptist | L 69-76 ^{OT} | 21-9 (12-5) | 18 – Hull | 10 – Tied | 4 – Hull | Moody Coliseum (1,231); Abilene, TX |
| March 7, 2026; 2:00 pm, ESPN+ | | at UT Arlington | W 72-57 | 22-9 (13-5) | 13 – Tied | 9 – Tied | 7 – Hull | College Park Center (795); Arlington, TX |
WAC tournament
| March 13, 2026; 4:30 pm, ESPN+ | (2) | vs. (6) UT Arlington; Semifinals | W 70–50 | 23–9 | 20 – Hull | 9 – Woodson | 5 – Chavez | Orleans Arena (786); Paradise, NV |
| March 14, 2026; 2:30 pm, ESPNU | (2) | vs. (1) California Baptist; Semifinals | L 58–74 | 23–10 | 16 – Woodson | 12 – Troxell | 5 – Hull | Orleans Arena (576); Paradise, NV |
WNIT
| March 24, 2026; 6:00 pm, ESPN+ | | FIU; Round 2 | W 77–66 | 24–10 | 18 – Woodson | 5 – Woodson | 7 – Stone | Moody Coliseum (376); Abilene, TX |
| March 27, 2026; 6:30 pm, ESPN+ | | at Illinois State; Super 16 | L 55–59 | 24–11 | 17 – Hull | 9 – Woodson | 4 – Davis | CEFCU Arena (1,416); Normal, IL |
*Non-conference game. ^{#}Rankings from AP Poll. (#) Tournament seedings in parentheses. All times are in Central.
