= 2025–26 California Baptist Lancers women's basketball team =

American college basketball season

2025–26 California Baptist Lancers women's basketball

WAC regular season and tournament champions

NCAA Tournament, First Round
- Conference: Western Athletic Conference
- Record: 23–11 (15–3 WAC)
- Head coach: Jarrod Olson (14th season)
- Associate head coach: Brittany Chambers
- Assistant coaches: Kamille Gouveia; Kelsey Keizer; Gracie Blake; Joselyn Ryan
- Home arena: Fowler Events Center

2025–26 WAC women's basketball standings
	Conf.				Overall
Team	W		L	PCT	W		L	PCT
California Baptist †	15	–	3	.833	23	–	11	.676
Abilene Christian	13	–	5	.722	24	–	11	.686
Southern Utah	11	–	7	.611	19	–	13	.594
Utah Valley	9	–	9	.500	16	–	15	.516
Tarleton	7	–	11	.389	14	–	17	.452
UT Arlington	4	–	14	.222	12	–	21	.364
Utah Tech	4	–	14	.222	9	–	20	.310
† 2026 WAC tournament winner

The 2025–26 California Baptist Lancers women's basketball team represented California Baptist University during the 2025–26 NCAA Division I women's basketball season. The Lancers, led by 14th-year head coach Jarrod Olson, played their home games at the Fowler Events Center in Riverside, California as members of the Western Athletic Conference.

This was the Lancers' last season as members of the WAC, as they joined the Big West Conference, effective July 1, 2026.

== Previous season ==
The Lancers finished the 2024–25 season 12–19, 9–7 in WAC play, to finish in a three-way tie for fourth place. They were defeated by UT Arlington in the quarterfinals of the WAC tournament.

== Preseason ==
On October 29, 2025, the Western Athletic Conference released their preseason poll. California Baptist was picked to finish second in the conference, with four first-place votes.

=== Preseason rankings ===
WAC Preseason Poll
Place	Team	Votes
1	Abilene Christian	32 (2)
2	California Baptist	31 (4)
3	UT Arlington	25 (1)
4	Utah Valley	23
5	Tarleton State	18
6	Utah Tech	12
7	Southern Utah	6
(#) first-place votes

=== Preseason All-WAC Team ===
Preseason All-WAC Team
Player	Year	Position
Khloe Lemon	Junior	Guard

== Roster ==
2025–26 California Baptist Lancers women's basketball team
Players
Coaches

Pos.	#	Name	Height	Year	Previous school	Hometown
G	3	Shawnee Nordstrom	5 ft 6 in (1.68 m)	So	Lone Peak High School	Hamilton, New Zealand
G	4	Reyleigh Hess	6 ft 0 in (1.83 m)	Fr	Windsor High School	Windsor, Colorado
G	5	Filipa Barros	5 ft 9 in (1.75 m)	RS Jr	Portuguese U20 National Team	Vermoim Maia, Portugal
G	10	Chance Bucher	5 ft 7 in (1.7 m)	GS	Eckerd College	Half Moon Bay, California
G	11	Sofia Alonso	5 ft 6 in (1.68 m)	Jr	Sacramento State	Valladolid, Spain
G	13	Lauren Olsen	5 ft 8 in (1.73 m)	Fr	Douglas High School	Douglas, Wyoming
F	14	Emma Johansson	6 ft 3 in (1.91 m)	Sr	South Florida	Jönköping, Sweden
G	15	Aleyah Harmon	5 ft 4 in (1.63 m)	Fr	Christian Brothers High School	Sacramento, California
F	21	Paula Haw	6 ft 5 in (1.96 m)	Jr	Sacramento State	Munich, Germany
G	24	Khloe Lemon	5 ft 9 in (1.75 m)	Jr	Millard South High School	Omaha, Nebraska
G	27	CeCe Legaspi	5 ft 10 in (1.78 m)	So	Rocky Mountain High School	Meridian, Idaho
G	32	Marta De La Fuente	5 ft 7 in (1.7 m)	Fr	IES Seita Palmas	Rivas-Vaciamadrid, Spain
F	33	Grace Schmidt	6 ft 0 in (1.83 m)	Sr	Watertown Luther Prep	Ixonia, Wisconsin

Head coach

- Jarrod Olson (Doane)

Assistant coach(es)

- Brittany Chambers (Cal Baptist)
- Kamille Gouveia (Cal Baptist)
- Kelsey Keizer (Drake)
- Gracie Blake (Cal Baptist)
- Joselyn Ryan (Regis)

Legend

- (C) Team captain
- (S) Suspended
- (I) Ineligible
- (W) Walk-on
- Injured
- Current redshirt

Roster
Last update: January 24, 2026

== Schedule and results ==
Date time, TV	Rank^{#}	Opponent^{#}	Result	Record	High points	High rebounds	High assists	Site (attendance) city, state
Non-conference regular season
November 3, 2025*; 5:00 pm, ESPN+		UC Riverside; Crosstown Showdown	W 56–53	1–0	22 – Bucher	20 – Johansson	3 – Barros	Fowler Events Center (1,085); Riverside, CA
November 8, 2025*; 1:00 pm, ESPN+		at Pacific	W 67–54	2–0	27 – Olsen	13 – Johansson	3 – Tied	Alex G. Spanos Center (521); Stockton, CA
November 12, 2025*; 6:00 pm, ESPN+		at Long Beach State	W 83–60	3–0	17 – Lemon	12 – Barros	11 – Barros	LBS Financial Credit Union Pyramid (628); Long Beach, CA
November 14, 2025*; 5:00 pm, ESPN+		San Jose State	W 69–55	4–0	23 – Olsen	7 – Barros	4 – Tied	Fowler Events Center (1,029); Riverside, CA
November 19, 2025*; 6:00 pm, ESPN+		Cal State Northridge	W 86−54	5−0	23 – Barros	11 – Tied	7 – Barros	Fowler Events Center (421); Riverside, CA
November 28, 2025*; 12:00 pm, ESPN+		UC Santa Barbara; CBU Classic	L 49−74	5−1	13 – Olsen	8 – Johansson	2 – Tied	Fowler Events Center (515); Riverside, CA
November 29, 2025*; 12:00 pm, ESPN+		Sacramento State; CBU Classic	W 92–49	6–1	20 – Olsen	8 – Tied	9 – Barros	Fowler Events Center (354); Riverside, CA
December 3, 2025*; 6:00 pm, ESPN+		at Pepperdine	L 58–69	6–2	21 – Johansson	13 – Barros	7 – Barros	Firestone Fieldhouse (251); Malibu, CA
December 6, 2025*; 12:00 pm, MWN		at Boise State	L 80–82	6–3	26 – Lemon	11 – Barros	10 – Barros	ExtraMile Arena (1,696); Boise, ID
December 13, 2025*; 2:00 pm, ESPN+		at UC Irvine	L 57–77	6–4	15 – Olsen	7 – Johansson	2 – Nordstrom	Bren Events Center (441); Irvine, CA
December 15, 2025*; 6:00 pm, ESPN+		UC San Diego	L 59–67	6–5	11 – Barros	7 – Johansson	2 – Johansson	Fowler Events Center (368); Riverside, CA
December 19, 2025*; 12:00 pm, SLN		at Denver	L 71−76	6−6	22 – Schmidt	8 – Olsen	4 – Barros	Hamilton Gymnasium (330); Denver, CO
December 21, 2025*; 9:00 am, B1G+		at No. 23 Nebraska	L 56–87	6–7	17 – Olsen	8 – Olsen	5 – Barros	Pinnacle Bank Arena (5,391); Lincoln, NE
WAC regular season
December 29, 2025; 6:00 pm, ESPN+		Utah Valley	W 82–51	7–7 (1–0)	20 – Olsen	13 – Barros	8 – Barros	Fowler Events Center (358); Riverside, CA
January 1, 2026; 1:00 pm, ESPN+		UT Arlington	W 85–64	8–7 (2–0)	23 – Olsen	11 – Barros	3 – Nordstrom	Fowler Events Center (309); Riverside, CA
January 3, 2026; 1:00 pm, ESPN+		Tarleton State	W 80–68	9–7 (3–0)	20 – Olsen	11 – Barros	5 – Barros	Fowler Events Center (483); Riverside, CA
January 8, 2026; 6:00 pm, ESPN+		at Utah Tech	W 75–67	10–7 (4–0)	18 – Lemon	12 – Barros	4 – Johansson	Burns Arena (512); St. George, UT
January 10, 2026; 1:00 pm, ESPN+		at Southern Utah	W 82–77 ^{OT}	11–7 (5–0)	23 – Schmidt	10 – Barros	7 – Barros	America First Event Center (469); Cedar City, UT
January 15, 2026; 11:00 am, ESPN+		Abilene Christian	L 58–70	11–8 (5–1)	19 – Olsen	8 – Nordstrom	3 – Tied	Fowler Events Center (4,157); Riverside, CA
January 22, 2026; 6:00 pm, ESPN+		at Utah Tech	W 67–61	12–8 (6–1)	16 – Lemon	12 – Barros	2 – Tied	Burns Arena (580); St. George, UT
January 24, 2026; 1:00 pm, ESPN+		at Utah Valley	W 85-75	13-8 (7-1)	21 – Nordstrom	10 – Barros	10 – Barros	UCCU Center (681); Orem, UT
January 31, 2026; 1:00 pm, ESPN+		UT Arlington	W 83-55	14-8 (8-1)	32 – Barros	8 – Barros	6 – Alonso	Fowler Events Center (742); Riverside, CA
February 5, 2026; 5:00 pm, ESPN+		at Tarleton State	W 77-67	15-8 (9-1)	22 – Barros	13 – Barros	3 – Alonso	EECU Center (837); Stephenville, TX
February 7, 2026; 11:00 am, ESPN+		at Abilene Christian	W 74-71	16-8 (10-1)	25 – Lemon	7 – Lemon	3 – Tied	Moody Coliseum (1,167); Abilene, TX
February 12, 2026; 6:00 pm, ESPN+		Southern Utah	L 70-85	16-9 (10-2)	16 – Olsen	10 – Barros	6 – Barros	Fowler Events Center (501); Riverside, CA
February 14, 2026; 1:00 pm, ESPN+		Utah Tech	W 82-70	17-9 (11-2)	20 – Olsen	9 – Barros	6 – Tied	Fowler Events Center (437); Riverside, CA
February 18, 2026; 6:00 pm, ESPN+		Utah Valley	L 61-63	17-10 (11-3)	18 – Olsen	9 – Barros	8 – Barros	Fowler Events Center (559); Riverside, CA
February 26, 2026; 4:30 pm, ESPN+		at UT Arlington	W 79-72	18-10 (12-3)	23 – Barros	14 – Barros	7 – Barros	College Park Center (637); Arlington, TX
February 28, 2026; 12:00 pm, ESPN+		at Tarleton State	W 76-67	19-10 (13-3)	16 – Tied	10 – Barros	2 – Tied	EECU Center (533); Stephenville, TX
March 5, 2026; 4:00 pm, ESPN+		at Abilene Christian	W 76-69 ^{OT}	20-10 (14-3)	26 – Barros	14 – Barros	5 – Schmidt	Moody Coliseum (1,231); Abilene, TX
March 7, 2026; 1:00 pm, ESPN+		Southern Utah	W 77-61	21-10 (15-3)	19 – Bucher	12 – Barros	5 – Schmidt	Fowler Events Center (731); Riverside, CA
WAC tournament
March 13, 2026; 12:00 pm, ESPN+	(1)	vs. (5) Tarleton State; Semifinal	W 77–60	22–10	21 – Barros	13 – Barros	5 – Tied	Orleans Arena (786); Paradise, NV
March 14, 2026; 12:30 pm, ESPN+	(1)	vs. (2) Abilene Christian; Final	W 74–58	23–10	17 – Olsen	13 – Barros	11 – Barros	Orleans Arena (576); Paradise, NV
NCAA Tournament
March 21, 2026; 7:00 p.m., ESPN	(16 S2)	at (1 S2) No. 2 UCLA; First Round	L 43–96	23–11	–	–	–	Pauley Pavilion (7,250); Los Angeles, CA
*Non-conference game. ^{#}Rankings from AP Poll. (#) Tournament seedings in parentheses. S2=Sacramento 2. All times are in Pacific.
