= 2026 WAC women's basketball tournament =

Postseason women's basketball tournament

- Classification: Division I
- Season: 2025–26
- Teams: 7
- Site: Orleans Arena; Paradise, Nevada
- Champions: California Baptist (2nd title)
- Winning coach: Jarrod Olson (2nd title)
- Television: ESPNU, ESPN2

2025–26 WAC women's basketball standings
	Conf.				Overall
Team	W		L	PCT	W		L	PCT
California Baptist †	15	–	3	.833	23	–	11	.676
Abilene Christian	13	–	5	.722	24	–	11	.686
Southern Utah	11	–	7	.611	19	–	13	.594
Utah Valley	9	–	9	.500	16	–	15	.516
Tarleton	7	–	11	.389	14	–	17	.452
UT Arlington	4	–	14	.222	12	–	21	.364
Utah Tech	4	–	14	.222	9	–	20	.310
† 2026 WAC tournament winner

The 2026 WAC women's basketball tournament was a postseason women's basketball tournament for the Western Athletic Conference (WAC) in the 2025–26 NCAA Division I women's basketball season. The tournament was played from March 11–14, 2026 with all rounds at the Orleans Arena in Paradise, Nevada near Las Vegas. This was the 16th year in which the tournament was held at Orleans Arena. The winner, California Baptist, received the conference's automatic bid to the NCAA tournament.

This was the last women's tournament under the Western Athletic Conference name. On July 1, 2026, the WAC officially rebranded as the United Athletic Conference, assuming the name previously used for the current football-only alliance between the WAC and Atlantic Sun Conference. Three of the legacy WAC members (Abilene Christian, Tarleton State, and UT Arlington) maintained their conference memberships through the transition. It was also the last WAC/UAC tournament held in the Las Vegas Valley; with the westernmost UAC members now in Texas, the tournament moved to the Dallas–Fort Worth city of Allen, Texas at the Credit Union of Texas Event Center.

== Seeds ==
All seven members were invited to the tournament. The field for the WAC tournament has varied from six to twelve qualifiers. All teams are eligible for the NCAA tournament including Tarleton and Utah Tech which completed their transition to Division I in 2024. For the 2025 WAC tournament, seeding was determined by conference record with ties broken first by head-to-head competition, then by the WAC Résumé Seeding System points. The highest two seeded teams will receive byes to the semifinals in this year's tournament.

Seed	School	Conference record	Tiebreak
1	California Baptist	15–3	
2	Abilene Christian	13–5	
3	Southern Utah	11–7	
4	Utah Valley	9–9	
5	Tarleton	7–11	
6	UT Arlington	4–14	2–1 vs. Utah Tech
7	Utah Tech	4–14	1–2 vs. UT Arlington

== Schedule ==
Session	Game	Time*	Matchup^{#}	Score	Television	Attendance
First round – Wednesday, March 11, 2026 – Orleans Arena, Paradise, Nevada
1	1	3:00 p.m.	No. 6 UT Arlington vs No. 7 Utah Tech	77–73	ESPN+	760
Quarterfinals – Thursday, March 12, 2026 – Orleans Arena, Paradise, Nevada
3	2	12:00 p.m.	No. 4 Utah Valley vs. No. 5 Tarleton	57–60	ESPN+	786
3	3	2:30 p.m.	No. 3 Southern Utah vs. No. 6 UT Arlington	65–70	ESPN+	786
Semifinals – Friday, March 13, 2026 – Orleans Arena, Paradise, Nevada
4	4	12:00 p.m.	No. 1 California Baptist vs. No. 5 Tarleton	77–60	ESPN+	786
4	5	2:30 p.m.	No. 2 Abilene Christian vs. No. 6 UT Arlington	70–50	ESPN+	786
Championship – Saturday, March 14, 2026 – Orleans Arena, Paradise, Nevada
5	6	12:30 p.m.	No. 1 California Baptist vs. No. 2 Abilene Christian	74–58	ESPNU	576
* Game times in PDT for all rounds.^{#}Rankings denote tournament seeding.

== Bracket ==
First Round; Wednesday, March 11; ESPN+
6	UT Arlington	77
7	Utah Tech	73

Quarterfinals; Thursday March 12; ESPN+
4	Utah Valley	57
5	Tarleton	60
3	Southern Utah	65
6	UT Arlington	70

Semifinals; Friday, March 13; ESPN+
1	California Baptist	77
5	Tarleton	60
2	Abilene Christian	70
6	UT Arlington	50

Championship; Saturday, March 14; ESPNU
1	California Baptist	74
2	Abilene Christian	58

== Awards ==
Award	Player	Team
Most Outstanding Player	Filipa Barros	California Baptist
All-Tournament Team	Emma Johansson	California Baptist
	Shawnee Nordstrom	California Baptist
	Payton Hull	Abilene Christian
	Erin Woodson	Abilene Christian

== See also ==
- 2026 WAC men's basketball tournament
