= 2023 Women's Basketball Invitational =

American basketball tournament

- Season: 2022–23
- Teams: 8
- Finals site: Clive M. Beck Center, Lexington, Kentucky
- Champions: Cal Baptist (1st title)
- Runner-up: New Mexico State (1st title game)
- Winning coach: Jarrod Olson (1st title)
- MVP: Grace Schmidt (Cal Baptist)

The 2023 Women's Basketball Invitational (WBI) is a single-elimination tournament consisting of eight NCAA Division I teams not selected to participate in the 2023 NCAA Division I women's basketball tournament or 2023 Women's National Invitation Tournament. The 2023 field was announced on March 13. The 2023 edition of the tournament was played on the campus of Transylvania University in Lexington, Kentucky at the Clive M. Beck Center. This was the third year in a row the tournament consisted of an eight-team field played over four days, with a winners and consolation bracket, guaranteeing three games for all teams. There was no winning percentage requirement to compete in the tournament. Cal Baptist won the tournament in their first-ever appearance.

== Participating teams ==
The following teams accepted invitations to compete in the 2023 Women's Basketball Invitational:

Team	Conference	Appearance	Last bid
East Tennessee State	SoCon	1st	Never
FIU	C-USA	2nd	2019
New Mexico State	WAC	1st	Never
UIC	Missouri Valley	2nd	2014
Cal Baptist	WAC	1st	Never
North Dakota	Summit	4th	2016
Georgia Southern	Sun Belt	1st	Never
Northern Illinois	MAC	1st	Never

== Schedule ==
Game	Time	Matchup	Score	Attendance
First round – Friday, March 17
1	12:00 p.m.	East Tennessee State vs. FIU	81–56	
2	2:30 p.m.	New Mexico State vs. UIC	51–41	
3	5:00 p.m.	Cal Baptist vs. North Dakota	96–79	
4	7:30 p.m.	Georgia Southern vs. Northern Illinois	69–58	
Semifinals – Saturday, March 18
5	12:00 p.m.	FIU vs. UIC	68–65	
6	2:30 p.m.	East Tennessee State vs. New Mexico State	53–57	
7	5:00 p.m.	North Dakota vs. Northern Illinois	102–99	
8	7:30 p.m.	Cal Baptist vs. Georgia Southern	82–80	
Finals – Sunday, March 19
9	12:00 p.m.	UIC vs. Northern Illinois	71–56	
10	2:30 p.m.	FIU vs. North Dakota	76–73	
11	5:00 p.m.	East Tennessee State vs. Georgia Southern	96–49	
12	7:30 p.m.	New Mexico State vs. Cal Baptist	61–63	
Game times in Eastern Time.

== Bracket ==
5th place game March 19
FIU	76
North Dakota	73
7th place game March 19
UIC	71
Northern Illinois	56

Consolation; March 18
FIU	68
UIC	65
North Dakota	102
Northern Illinois	99

First round March 17
East Tennessee State	81
FIU	56
New Mexico State	51
UIC	41
Cal Baptist	96
North Dakota	79
Georgia Southern	69
Northern Illinois	58

Semifinals; March 18
East Tennessee State	53
New Mexico State	57
Cal Baptist	82
Georgia Southern	80

Championship; March 19
New Mexico State	61
Cal Baptist	63
3rd place game March 19
East Tennessee State	96
Georgia Southern	49

== See also ==
- 2023 NCAA Division I women's basketball tournament
- 2023 Women's National Invitation Tournament
