= 2021 WAC women's basketball tournament =

Postseason women's basketball tournament

- Classification: Division I
- Season: 2020–21
- Teams: 7
- Site: Orleans Arena; Paradise, Nevada
- Champions: California Baptist (1st title)
- Winning coach: Jarrod Olson (1st title)
- MVP: Caitlyn Harper (California Baptist)

2020–21 WAC women's basketball standings
	Conf.				Overall
Team	W		L	PCT	W		L	PCT
California Baptist*†	14	–	0	1.000	26	–	1	.963
Utah Valley^	10	–	4	.714	13	–	6	.684
Grand Canyon	8	–	4	.667	18	–	7	.720
New Mexico State	6	–	6	.500	9	–	12	.429
Seattle	6	–	8	.429	11	–	14	.440
Tarleton State*	4	–	10	.286	9	–	16	.360
UTRGV	2	–	8	.200	6	–	14	.300
Chicago State	0	–	10	.000	0	–	14	.000
Dixie State*	0	–	0	–	1	–	2	.333
† 2021 WAC tournament winner * ineligible for the 2021 NCAA tournament due to transition period. Dixie State suspended its season on January 6, 2021.^ received automatic bid for the 2021 NCAA tournament as conference tournament runner-up, due to California Baptist's ineligibility Rankings from AP poll

The 2021 WAC women's basketball tournament was the postseason women's basketball tournament for the Western Athletic Conference during the 2020–21 season. All tournament games were played at the Orleans Arena in Paradise, Nevada, March 10–13, 2021. Cal Baptist won the tournament and would have received the WAC's automatic bid to the 2021 NCAA tournament, but, due to transition from Division II to Division I, were ineligible. The WAC automatic bid went to Utah Valley, who finished second in the regular season standings.

== Seeds ==
Seven of the 9 teams in the WAC are eligible to compete in the conference tournament for NCAA postseason play. California Baptist is ineligible due to their transition from Division II to Division I, and Dixie State ended their season in January. Teams will be seeded by record within the conference.

Seed	School	Conference
1	California Baptist	14–0
2	Utah Valley	10–4
3	Grand Canyon	8–4
4	New Mexico State	6–6
5	Seattle	6–8
6	UTRGV	2–8
7	Chicago State	0–10

== Schedule and results ==
Game	Time	Matchup	Score	Television
Quarterfinals – Wednesday March 10
1	Noon	No. 5 Seattle vs No. 4 New Mexico State	46–56	
2	2:30 pm	No. 2 Utah Valley vs. No. 7 Chicago State	61–43	
3	8:30 pm	No. 3 Grand Canyon vs. No. 6 UTRGV	67–54	
Semifinals – Friday, March 12
4	11:00 am	No. 4 New Mexico State vs. No. 1 California Baptist	54–79	
5	2:00 pm	No. 2 Utah Valley vs. No. 3 Grand Canyon	54–57	
Final – Saturday, March 13
6	2:00 pm	No. 1 California Baptist vs. No. 3 Grand Canyon	78–60	
Game times in PDT. Rankings denote tournament seed.

== Bracket ==
Quarterfinals; March 10
5	Seattle	46
4	New Mexico State	56
2	Utah Valley	61
7	Chicago State	43
3	Grand Canyon	67
6	UTRGV	54

Semifinals; March 12
1	California Baptist	79
4	New Mexico State	54
2	Utah Valley	54
3	Grand Canyon	57

Championship; March 13
1	California Baptist	78
3	Grand Canyon	60
