= 2026 Women's National Invitation Tournament =

American collegiate basketball tournament

- Season: 2025–26
- Teams: 48
- Finals site: Cam Henderson Center, Huntington, West Virginia
- Champions: Marshall (1st title)
- Runner-up: Illinois State (1st title game)
- Semifinalists: South Dakota (2nd semifinal); Arkansas State (1st semifinal)
- Winning coach: Juli Fulks (1st title)
- MVP: Timaya Lewis-Eutsey (Marshall)

The 2026 Women's National Invitation Tournament was a single-elimination tournament of 48 NCAA Division I women's college basketball teams that were not selected for the field of the 2026 NCAA tournament or the 2026 WBIT. The tournament committee announced the 48-team field on March 16, following the selection of the fields for the NCAA tournament and WBIT.

== Participants ==
=== Automatic qualifiers ===
The 2026 field featured 9 automatic qualifiers and 39 at-large bids. Automatic qualifiers for the WNIT were teams that were the 2–seeds in their conference tournament that did not receive a bid into the NCAA tournament or the WBIT.

For the first time since their transition to Division I in the 2024–25 academic year, Mercyhurst participated in the NCAA postseason.

School	Conference	Record	Appearance	Last bid
Abilene Christian	WAC	23–10	3rd	2017
Alcorn State	SWAC	17–13	1st	Never
FIU	CUSA	20–11	9th	2024
Lamar	Southland	20–10	5th	2019
Maryland Eastern Shore	MEAC	19–14	1st	Never
Mercyhurst	NEC	15–16	1st	Never
Montana State	Big Sky	25–7	2nd	2016
Radford	Big South	22–12	5th	2017
Youngstown State	Horizon	24–9	5th	2022

=== At-large bids ===
School	Conference	Record	Appearance	Last bid
Air Force	Mountain West	16–18	3rd	2025
Arkansas State	Sun Belt	24–9	9th	2016
Army	Patriot	24–7	4th	2025
Austin Peay	ASUN	19–13	1st	Never
Binghamton	America East	19–12	1st	Never
Bradley	Missouri Valley	20–12	1st	Never
Cleveland State	Horizon	24–9	3rd	2025
Drexel	CAA	21–10	12th	2023
Florida Gulf Coast	ASUN	16–15	7th	2016
George Washington	Atlantic 10	15–17	6th	2017
Illinois State	Missouri Valley	20–13	17th	2025
La Salle	Atlantic 10	18–13	1st	Never
Lehigh	Patriot	17–14	2nd	2011
Loyola Chicago	Atlantic 10	14–17	1st	Never
Marshall	Sun Belt	23–9	2nd	2016
Merrimack	MAAC	19–12	1st	Never
Middle Tennessee	CUSA	16–15	9th	2022
Monmouth	CAA	20–11	3rd	2024
Morehead State	OVC	18–14	3rd	2019
NJIT	America East	18–12	1st	Never
Norfolk State	MEAC	18–14	2nd	2022
Northern Colorado	Big Sky	22–10	5th	2019
Ohio	MAC	18–13	6th	2022
Pepperdine	WCC	19–12	7th	2022
Portland	WCC	18–14	4th	2022
Purdue Fort Wayne	Horizon	20–13	3rd	2025
Sam Houston	CUSA	18–12	2nd	2013
San Francisco	WCC	18–14	6th	2023
South Alabama	Sun Belt	16–18	5th	2019
South Dakota	Summit	23–9	7th	2024
Southern Indiana	OVC	21–10	3rd	2025
Southern Utah	WAC	19–12	2nd	2014
St. Bonaventure	Atlantic 10	16–15	5th	2014
Stetson	ASUN	20–11	6th	2024
UC Davis	Big West	23–10	6th	2018
UMBC	America East	16–14	2nd	2011
Utah Valley	WAC	16–14	2nd	2025
UTRGV	Southland	20–13	2nd	2016
Wake Forest	ACC	14–17	9th	2023

== Bracket ==
* – Denotes overtime period
(H) - Denotes home team
Teams with a bye are not guaranteed to play at home in the second round.

Round 1 March 19–21
(H)	Pepperdine	71
UC Davis	68
(H)	Air Force	72
Northern Colorado	79
(H)	Portland	62
Sam Houston	59
(H)	San Francisco	80
Utah Valley	50

Round 2 March 22–24
Southern Utah	80
(H)	Pepperdine	85
(H)	South Dakota	80
Northern Colorado	60
Lamar	68
(H)	Portland	78
(H)	Montana State	69
San Francisco	53

Super 16; March 25–27
Pepperdine	57
(H)	South Dakota	73
Portland	54
(H)	Montana State	72

Great 8 March 28–30
(H)	South Dakota	65
Montana State	56

Round 1 March 19–21
(H)	Norfolk State	54
Loyola Chicago	58
(H)	George Washington	63
Bradley	60
(H)	FIU	76*
Stetson	73
(H)	Austin Peay	59
UTRGV	71

Round 2 March 22–24
(H)	Florida Gulf Coast	56
Loyola Chicago	62
(H)	Southern Indiana	58
George Washington	61
(H)	Abilene Christian	77
FIU	66
(H)	Illinois State	81
UTRGV	52

Super 16; March 25–27
Loyola Chicago	62
(H)	George Washington	71
Abilene Christian	55
(H)	Illinois State	59

Great 8 March 28–30
George Washington	53
(H)	Illinois State	61

Round 1 March 19–21
(H)	Merrimack	65
NJIT	68
(H)	Mercyhurst	60
Binghamton	81
(H)	Wake Forest	48
Maryland Eastern Shore	59
(H)	Ohio	58
UMBC	62*

Round 2 March 22–24
(H)	Army	59
NJIT	52
(H)	La Salle	70
Binghamton	61
(H)	Youngstown State	61
Maryland Eastern Shore	42
(H)	Marshall	66
UMBC	53

Super 16; March 25–27
(H)	Army	74
La Salle	63
(H)	Youngstown State	46
Marshall	72

Great 8 March 28–30
Army	65
(H)	Marshall	82

Round 1 March 19–21
(H)	Alcorn State	65
South Alabama	73
(H)	Radford	77
Morehead State	58
(H)	St. Bonaventure	69*
Drexel	67
(H)	Monmouth	72
Lehigh	62

Round 2 March 22–24
(H)	Purdue Fort Wayne	77
South Alabama	72
(H)	Arkansas State	83
Radford	52
(H)	Middle Tennessee	69
St. Bonaventure	50
(H)	Cleveland State	74
Monmouth	68

Super 16; March 25–27
Purdue Fort Wayne	72
(H)	Arkansas State	83
(H)	Middle Tennessee	56
Cleveland State	66

Great 8 March 28–30
(H)	Arkansas State	71
Cleveland State	53

=== Fab 4 and Championship Game ===
Fab 4 April 1
(H)	South Dakota	60
Illinois State	67
Marshall	69
(H)	Arkansas State	62

Championship; April 4
Illinois State	41
(H)	Marshall	66

== See also ==
- 2026 NCAA Division I women's basketball tournament
- 2026 Women's Basketball Invitation Tournament
- 2026 National Invitation Tournament
