= Jarrod Olson =

American basketball coach

Current position
- Title: Head coach
- Team: California Baptist
- Conference: Big West
- Record: 319–127 (.715)

Biographical details
- Born: July 12, 1974 (age 51)

Playing career
- 1993–1997: Doane

Coaching career (HC unless noted)

Women's basketball
- 1997–1998: Emporia State (GA)
- 2000–2002: College of Saint Mary
- 2002–2006: Creighton (assistant)
- 2006–2012: Florida Southern
- 2012–present: California Baptist

Men's basketball
- 1998–1999: Millard South HS (assistant)
- 1999–2000: Bellevue (assistant)

Head coaching record
- Overall: 455–223 (.671)
- Tournaments: 0–2 (NCAA D-1); 2–1 (WNIT); 12–5 (NCAA D-II)

Accomplishments and honors

Championships
- 2 WAC regular season (2021, 2024); 3 WAC conference tournament (2021, 2024, 2026); 2 PacWest regular season (2013, 2017); PacWest conference tournament (2017); 2 SSC regular season (2011, 2012); SSC conference tournament (2011)

Awards
- Kay Yow Award (2021); 4× WAC Coach of the Year (2019, 2021, 2024, 2026); 2× PacWest Coach of the Year (2016, 2017); 2× SSC Coach of the Year (2011, 2012)

Jarrod Olson (born July 12, 1974) is an American basketball coach who is currently the head women's basketball coach at California Baptist University, a role he has held since 2012.

== Head coaching record ==
Sources:

- Florida Southern
- California Baptist
- WAC

Record table
Season	Team	Overall	Conference	Standing	Postseason
Saint Mary Flames (Great Plains Athletic Conference) (2000–2002)
2000–01	Saint Mary	5–20			
2001–02	Saint Mary	18–15			
Saint Mary Flames:		23–35 (.397)			
Florida Southern Moccasins (Sunshine State Conference) (2006–2012)
2006–07	Florida Southern	11–17	6–10	7th	
2007–08	Florida Southern	15–13	7–9	6th	
2008–09	Florida Southern	18–10	8–8	5th	
2009–10	Florida Southern	19–9	9–7	4th	
2010–11	Florida Southern	26–5	14–2	1st	NCAA Division II second round
2011–12	Florida Southern	24–7	12–4	T–1st	NCAA Division II second round
Florida Southern:		113–61 (.649)	56–40 (.583)		
California Baptist Lancers (Pacific West Conference) (2012–2018)
2012–13	California Baptist	25–6	15–3	1st	
2013–14	California Baptist	16–12	13–7	T–3rd	
2014–15	California Baptist	29–7	16–4	2nd	NCAA Division II Runner-up
2015–16	California Baptist	29–3	19–1	T–1st	NCAA Division II Regional semifinal
2016–17	California Baptist	35–3	20–0	1st	NCAA Division II Final Four
2017–18	California Baptist	17–12	14–6	3rd	
California Baptist Lancers (Western Athletic Conference) (2018–2026)
2018–19	California Baptist	18–12	11–5	2nd	
2019–20	California Baptist	16–15	7–9	7th	
2020–21	California Baptist	26–1	14–0	1st (Note: California Baptist won the WAC tournament, but were ineligible for the NCAA tournament due to its transition from Division II and instead played in the WNIT.)	WNIT Quarterfinal
2021–22	California Baptist	23–9	13–5	3rd	WNIT first round
2022–23	California Baptist	22–13	13–5	3rd	WBI Champion
2023–24	California Baptist	28–4	18–2	1st	NCAA Division I First Round
2024–25	California Baptist	12–19	9–7	T–4th	
2025–26	California Baptist	23–11	15–3	1st	NCAA Division I First Round
California Baptist:		319–127 (.715)	197–57 (.776)		
Total:		455–223 (.671)			
National champion Postseason invitational champion Conference regular season champion Conference regular season and conference tournament champion Division regular season champion Division regular season and conference tournament champion Conference tournament champion
