= California Baptist Lancers women's basketball =

College basketball team in Riverside, California, United States

2025–26 California Baptist Lancers women's basketball team
- University: California Baptist University
- Head coach: Jarrod Olson (14th season)
- Location: Riverside, California
- Arena: Fowler Events Center (capacity: 6,000)
- Conference: Big West
- Nickname: Lancers
- Colors: Navy blue and gold

NCAA Division I tournament runner-up
- 2015*
Other NCAA Division I tournament results
Final Four	2015*, 2017*
Elite Eight	2015*, 2017*
Sweet Sixteen	2015*, 2017*
Appearances	2015*, 2016*, 2017*, 2024, 2026

Conference tournament champions
- PacWest: 2017; WAC: 2021, 2024, 2026

Conference regular-season champions
- WAC: 2021, 2024, 2026
- * at Division II level

The California Baptist Lancers women's basketball team represents California Baptist University in Riverside, California, United States. They compete as members of the Division I Western Athletic Conference (WAC). They are currently led by head coach Jarrod Olson and play at the Fowler Events Center.

In the 2020–21 season, the Lancers won the WAC regular season championship with a perfect 14–0 record. Despite being ineligible for the NCAA tournament due to being in the third year of a four-year transition from Division II to Division I, they were allowed by the WAC to compete in the conference tournament. They won the semifinal and final matchups against New Mexico State and Grand Canyon, respectively, by 43 combined points. Under normal circumstances, Cal Baptist would have thus secured the automatic bid to the 2021 NCAA tournament from the conference, but due to its ineligible status, was not allowed to participate in the NCAA tournament or any other NCAA-sponsored postseason tournament. Utah Valley, the WAC's second-place finisher in the regular season, received the WAC's automatic bid to the NCAA tournament (the program's first). The Lancers finished the year with a 26–1 record.

In the 2023–24 season, the Lancers earned their first NCAA women's basketball tournament appearance as a Division I school.

== Postseason results ==
=== NCAA Division I ===
==== NCAA tournament ====
The Lancers have appeared in the NCAA Division I women's basketball tournament twice. They have a record of 0–2.

Year	Seed	Round	Opponent	Result
2024	#15	First Round	#2 UCLA	L 55–84
2026	# 16	First Round	#1 UCLA	L 43–96

==== WBI tournament ====
The Lancers have appeared in the Women's Basketball Invitational once. They won the 2023 title.

Year	Round	Opponent	Result
2023	First Round; Semifinals; Championship	North Dakota; Georgia Southern; New Mexico State	W 96–79; W 82–80; W 63–61

==== WNIT tournament ====
The Lancers have appeared in the Women's National Invitation Tournament once. Their record is 2–1.

Year	Round	Opponent	Result
2021	First Round; Second Round; Quarterfinals	New Mexico; San Francisco; Rice	W 90–85; W 90–82; L 55–79

=== NCAA Division II ===
==== NCAA tournament ====
The Lancers have appeared in the NCAA Division II women's basketball tournament three times. They have a record of 10–3 and were national runners-up in 2015.

Year	Seed	Round	Opponent	Result
2015	#5	First Round; Regional Semifinals; Regional Finals; National Quarterfinals; National Semifinals; National Finals	#4 Hawaii Pacific #8 Point Loma #7 Cal Poly Pomona #2 New Haven #1 Limestone #1 California (PA)	W 77–69; W 73–46; W 81–58; W 86–77; W 85–67; L 86–69
2016	#3	First Round; Regional Semifinals	#6 Academy of Art #2 Alaska-Anchorage	W 93–70; L 83–79
2017	#2	First Round; Regional Semifinals; Regional Finals; National Quarterfinals; National Semifinals	#7 Point Loma #3 Western Washington #5 Simon Fraser #2 West Florida #3 Virginia Union	W 85–79; W 80–68; W 77–64; W 77–69; L 86–81

=== NAIA Division I ===
The Lancers made the NAIA women's basketball championship two times, with a combined record of 1–2.

Year	Seed	Round	Opponent	Result
1982	#7	First Round	#2 Berry	L 65–102
2011	#2	First Round; Second Round	#7 Texas Wesleyan #6 Shawnee State	W 88–75; L 58–64

== See also ==
- California Baptist Lancers men's basketball
