= Fowler Events Center =

Sports arena in Riverside, California

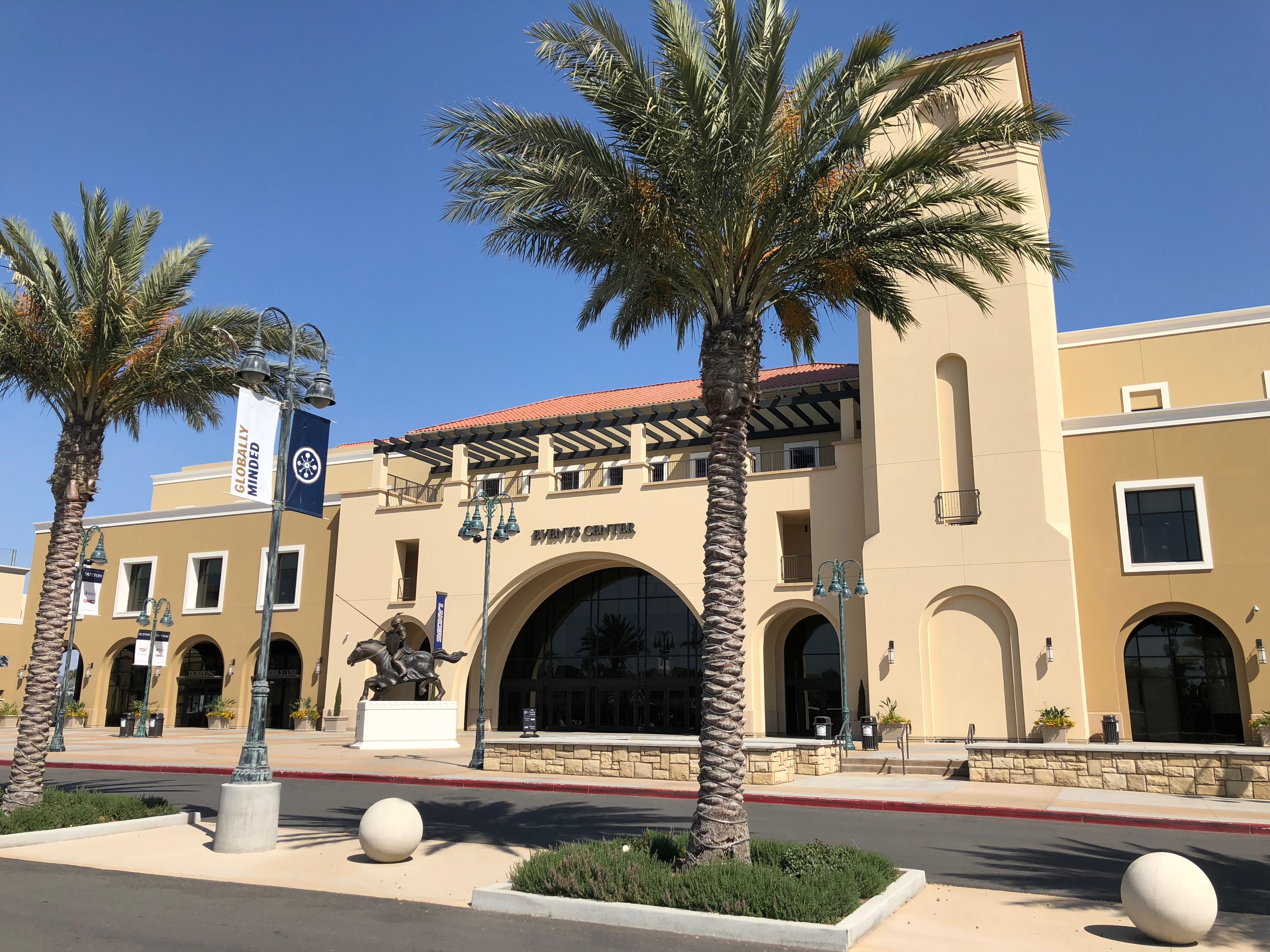

- Location in California Location in the United States
- Full name: Dale E. and Sarah Ann Fowler Events Center
- Former names: CBU Events Center (2017–2023)
- Location: 8431 Diana Ave. Riverside, CA
- Coordinates: 33.927501°N 117.423266°W
- Owner: California Baptist University
- Operator: California Baptist University
- Capacity: 5,050
- Surface: Multi-surface

Construction
- Opened: 2017
- Cost: $73 million

Tenants
- California Baptist Lancers men's basketball California Baptist Lancers women's basketball California Baptist Lancers women's volleyball California Baptist Lancers men's wrestling

The Dale E. and Sarah Ann Fowler Events Center (formerly known as CBU Events Center) is a sports arena in Riverside, California. It opened in 2017 and has a capacity of 5,050.

The 153,000-square-feet facility is home to the Cal Baptist Lancers men's and women's basketball teams as well as select matches for the women's volleyball and men's wrestling teams. The arena replaced Van Dyne Gym for men's and women's basketball as part of the Lancers' transition to Division I. The women's volleyball team and men's wrestling team use Van Dyne Gym as their main venue.

In addition to athletic events, the arena also hosts CBU's chapel program, student orientation activities and commencement ceremonies.

In February 2023 the arena was re-named in honor of Dale E. Fowler and his wife Sarah Ann Fowler in recognition of the couple's $28.5 million donation to the university.

== Gallery ==
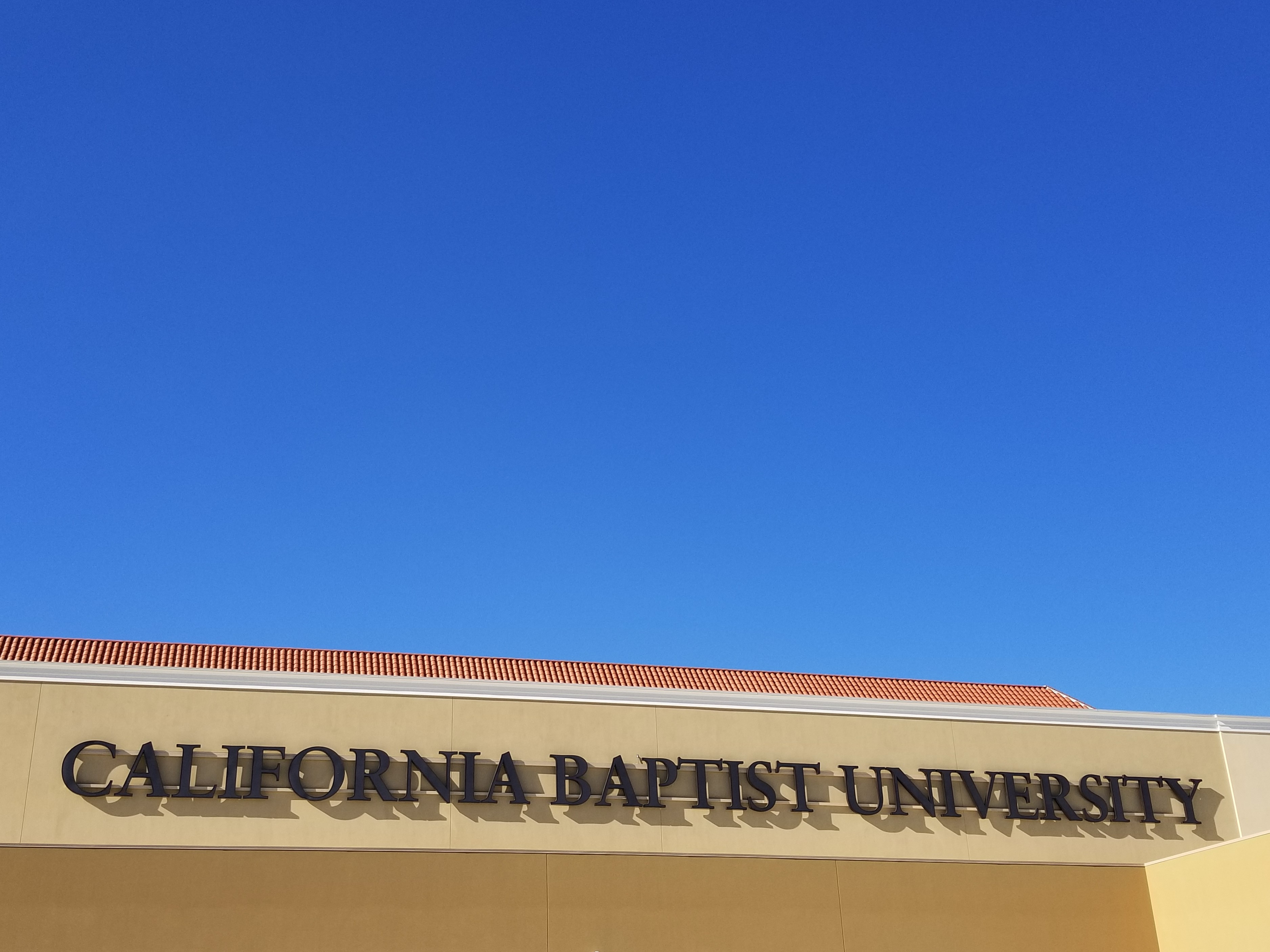
Fowler Events Center signage

== See also ==
- List of NCAA Division I basketball arenas
