= 2025 Women's National Invitation Tournament =

American collegiate basketball tournament

- Season: 2024–25
- Teams: 48
- Finals site: Alumni Arena, Amherst, NY
- Champions: Buffalo (1st title)
- Runner-up: Troy (1st title game)
- Semifinalists: Illinois State (2nd semifinal); Cleveland State (1st semifinal)
- Winning coach: Becky Burke (1st title)
- MVP: Chellia Watson (Buffalo)

The 2025 Women's National Invitation Tournament was a single-elimination tournament of 48 NCAA Division I women's college basketball teams that were not selected for the field of the 2025 Women's NCAA Tournament or the 2025 WBIT. The tournament committee announced the 48-team field on March 16, following the selection of the fields for the NCAA tournament and WBIT.

== Participants ==
The 2025 field featured 11 automatic qualifiers and 37 at-large selections, chosen after consideration of a mix of criteria by WNIT officials. There were 22 teams with 20 or more victories in the bracket.

=== Automatic qualifiers ===
Conference	School
America East	Bryant
ASUN	Central Arkansas
Big South	Longwood
MAAC	Siena
MEAC	Howard
Northeast	Stonehill
OVC	Lindenwood
Patriot	Army
SWAC	Texas Southern
Sun Belt	Troy
WAC	Tarleton State

=== At-large bids ===
School	Conference
Abilene Christian	WAC
Air Force	Mountain West
Alabama A&M	SWAC
Buffalo	MAC
Butler	Big East
Campbell	CAA
Chattanooga	SoCon
Cleveland State	Horizon
Coastal Carolina	Sun Belt
Colgate	Patriot
Charleston	CAA
Coppin State	MEAC
Duquesne	A10
Illinois State	Missouri Valley
Incarnate Word	Southland
Lipscomb	ASUN
Louisiana Tech	CUSA
Miami (OH)	MAC
Navy	Patriot
New Mexico State	CUSA
North Dakota State	Summit
North Texas	American
Northwestern State	Southland
Old Dominion	Sun Belt
Pacific	WCC
Purdue Fort Wayne	Horizon
Rutgers	Big Ten
Saint Mary's	WCC
Southern Indiana	OVC
Tulsa	American
UAB	American
UIC	Missouri Valley
UMass	A10
Utah Valley	WAC
UT Arlington	WAC
Washington State	WCC
Western Illinois	OVC

== Bracket ==
* – Denotes overtime period
(H) - Denotes home team
Teams with a bye are not guaranteed to play at home in the second round

Round 1 March 20–22
(H)	Air Force	64
Utah Valley	70
(H)	Pacific	49
New Mexico State	54
(H)	UT Arlington	78
Incarnate Word	52
(H)	Chattanooga	53
Alabama A&M	49

Round 2 March 23–25
(H)	Washington State	57
Utah Valley	54
(H)	North Dakota State	68
New Mexico State	65
(H)	North Texas	78
UT Arlington	67
(H)	Troy	85
Chattanooga	72

Super 16; March 26–28
Washington State	51
(H)	North Dakota State	59
North Texas	86
(H)	Troy	88*

Great 8 March 31
(H)	North Dakota State	88
Troy	97*

Round 1 March 20–22
(H)	Abilene Christian	86
Northwestern State	55
(H)	Western Illinois	89
Lipscomb	74
(H)	Lindenwood	76
Tulsa	60
(H)	Texas Southern	54
Saint Mary's	50

Round 2 March 23–25
(H)	Central Arkansas	53
Abilene Christian	75
(H)	Illinois State	90
Western Illinois	80
(H)	Tarleton State	59
Lindenwood	67
(H)	Louisiana Tech	71
Texas Southern	64

Super 16; March 26–28
Abilene Christian	68
(H)	Illinois State^	78
Lindenwood	64
(H)	Louisiana Tech	68

Great 8 March 31
(H)	Illinois State	78
Louisiana Tech	70

^ Despite Illinois State being designated as the home team, game played at nearby Shirk Center on the campus of Illinois Wesleyan University in Bloomington, Illinois (in the Bloomington–Normal metropolitan area).

Round 1 March 20–22
(H)	UMass	86
Stonehill	40
(H)	Coastal Carolina	55
Campbell	57
(H)	Bryant	58
Army	59
(H)	Howard	72
Siena	62

Round 2 March 23–25
(H)	Buffalo	84*
UMass	82
(H)	Southern Indiana	60
Campbell	51
(H)	Rutgers	71
Army	60
(H)	Charleston	76
Howard	56

Super 16; March 26–28
Buffalo	76
(H)	Southern Indiana	64
(H)	Rutgers	89
Charleston	67

Great 8 March 30
(H)	Buffalo	71
Rutgers	64

Round 1 March 20–22
(H)	Duquesne	70
Longwood	68
(H)	Colgate	48
Coppin State	58
(H)	Old Dominion	63
Navy	42
(H)	UIC	63
UAB	48

Round 2 March 23–25
(H)	Miami (OH)	66
Duquesne	73
(H)	Cleveland State	72*
Coppin State	70
(H)	Purdue Fort Wayne	87
Old Dominion	61
(H)	Butler	61
UIC	54

Super 16; March 26–28
Duquesne	52
(H)	Cleveland State	55
(H)	Purdue Fort Wayne	87
Butler	61

Great 8 March 31
Cleveland State	76
(H)	Purdue Fort Wayne	65

=== Semifinals and Championship Game ===
Semifinals; Fab 4 April 2
Troy	99
(H)	Illinois State	96
(H)	Buffalo	74
Cleveland State	69

Championship; April 5 CBSSN
Troy	84
(H)	Buffalo	88

== See also ==
- 2025 National Invitation Tournament
