= 2024–25 Utah Valley Wolverines women's basketball team =

Intercollegiate basketball season

2024–25 Utah Valley Wolverines women's basketball

WNIT, Second Round
- Conference: Western Athletic Conference
- Record: 19–13 (9–7 WAC)
- Head coach: Dan Nielson (6th season)
- Assistant coaches: Michael Shreeve (3rd season); McKenzie Mangino (1st season); Jasmine Porter (1st season) Paisley Johnson-Harding (1st season)
- Home arena: UCCU Center (Capacity: 8,500); Lockhart Arena (Capacity: 2,000)

2024–25 WAC women's basketball standings
	Conf.				Overall
Team	W		L	PCT	W		L	PCT
Grand Canyon †	16	–	0	1.000	32	–	3	.914
Tarleton	10	–	6	.625	20	–	14	.588
UT Arlington	10	–	6	.625	18	–	14	.563
Abilene Christian	9	–	7	.563	22	–	13	.629
Utah Valley	9	–	7	.563	19	–	13	.594
California Baptist	9	–	7	.563	12	–	19	.387
Southern Utah	7	–	9	.438	9	–	21	.300
Utah Tech	1	–	15	.063	6	–	25	.194
Seattle	1	–	15	.063	4	–	26	.133
† 2025 WAC tournament winner

The 2024–25 Utah Valley Wolverines women's basketball team represented Utah Valley University in the 2024–25 NCAA Division I women's basketball season. Dan Nielson entered the season as head coach for his sixth season. The Wolverines played their home games at the UCCU Center and Lockhart Arena in Orem, Utah as members of the Western Athletic Conference (WAC).

== Previous season ==
The Wolverines finished the 2023–24 season 10–19, 5–15 in WAC play, to finish tied for tenth place. As only the top eight teams were invited to the 2024 WAC tournament, the Wolverines failed to qualify for the 2024 WAC tournament.

== Offseason ==
=== Departures ===
Name	Position	Height	Year	Reason for departure
Kaylee Byon	G	5' 7"	Sophomore	Transferred to Point Loma Nazarene
Abby Conlee	G	6' 0"	Junior	Transferred to Westminster
Jenna Dick	G	5' 8"	Senior	Graduated
Noga Haran	G	5' 9"	Freshman	Transferred to Stetson
Liana Kaitu'u	F	6' 0"	Senior	Graduated
Eleyana Tafisi	G	5' 6"	Junior	Transferred to Appalachian State
Elina Tausinga	F	5' 10"	Junior	Graduated

=== Incoming transfers ===
Name	Position	Height	Year	Previous school
Aspen Caldwell	G	5' 7"	Sophomore	Idaho
Gracie Sorenson	C	6' 4"	Junior	Eastern Arizona
Danja Stafford Collins	F	6' 1"	Senior	Santa Clara

== Roster ==
2024–25 Utah Valley Wolverines women's basketball team
Players
Coaches

Pos.	#	Name	Height	Year	Previous school	Hometown
G	1	Kylee Mabry	5 ft 11 in (1.8 m)	Jr	Davis High School	Kaysville, UT
F	2	Aspen Caldwell	5 ft 7 in (1.7 m)	So	Thunder Ridge High School; Idaho	Idaho Falls, ID
G/F	3	Amanda Barcello	5 ft 11 in (1.8 m)	RS So	Seton Catholic High School BYU	Chandler, AZ
G	4	Kennedy Carlyle	6 ft 2 in (1.88 m)	Fr	Cedar Park High School	Cedar Park, TX
G	5	Cambree Blackham	5 ft 7 in (1.7 m)	Fr	Skyridge High School	Lehi, UT
F	7	Kendra Kitchen	6 ft 1 in (1.85 m)	Fr	Davis High School	Fruit Heights, UT
G	10	Saige Gibb	5 ft 10 in (1.78 m)	RS So	Timpview High School	Raymond, AB
G	13	Ally Criddle	5 ft 8 in (1.73 m)	Jr	Skyridge High School	Lehi, UT
G	21	Tahlia White	6 ft 0 in (1.83 m)	RS Jr	Mountain View High School BYU	Orem, UT
G	22	Abby Hendricks	5 ft 6 in (1.68 m)	Jr	La Costa Canyon High School	Carlsbad, CA
G/F	25	Halle Nelson	6 ft 1 in (1.85 m)	RS So	American Fork High School; Utah State	American Fork, UT
F	33	Danja Stafford Collins	6 ft 1 in (1.85 m)	RS Sr	Mountain View High School; Santa Clara	Orem, UT
C	34	Tessa Chaney	6 ft 3 in (1.91 m)	So	Westlake High School	Saratoga Springs, UT
C	44	Gracie Sorenson	5 ft 7 in (1.7 m)	So	Syracuse High School; Eastern Arizona	Syracuse, UT

Head coach

- Dan Nielson (BYU)

Assistant coach(es)

- Michael Shreeve (BYU)
- McKenzie Mangino (Hawaiʻi–Hilo)
- Jasmine Porter (Utah State)
- Paisley Johnson-Harding (BYU)

Strength and conditioning coach(es)

- Josh Morzelewski (Utah)

Athletic trainer(s)

- Aaron Leavitt

Legend

- (C) Team captain
- (S) Suspended
- (I) Ineligible
- (W) Walk-on
- Injured
- Current redshirt

Roster
Last update: January 25, 2025

== Schedule and results ==
Date time, TV	Rank^{#}	Opponent^{#}	Result	Record	Site (attendance) city, state
Non-conference regular season
November 6, 2024*; 6:00 p.m., ESPN+		Kansas City	W 72–48	1–0	UCCU Center (539); Orem, UT
November 9, 2024*; 5:00 p.m.		at Kennesaw State; C-USA/WAC	W 64–61	2–0	KSU Convocation Center (470); Kennesaw, GA
November 13, 2024*; 6:00 p.m., ESPN+		Park University (Gilbert, AZ)	W 100–37	3–0	UCCU Center (636); Orem, UT
November 16, 2024*; 2:00 p.m., ESPN+		CSU Bakersfield	W 72–48	4–0	UCCU Center (457); Orem, UT
November 22, 2024*; 6:00 p.m., ESPN+		Loyola Marymount	L 68–76	4–1	UCCU Center (474); Orem, UT
November 23, 2024*; 2:00 p.m., ESPN+		Bethesda (CA)	W 89–56	5–1	Lockhart Arena (381); Orem, UT
November 29, 2024*; 5:00 p.m.		vs. Alabama A&M; San Diego MTE	W 56–54	6–1	Jenny Craig Pavilion (88); San Diego, CA
November 30, 2024*; 3:00 p.m.		vs. Omaha; San Diego MTE	L 48–53	6–2	Jenny Craig Pavilion (97); San Diego, CA
December 4, 2024*; 6:30 p.m., MW Network		at Air Force	L 58–76	6–3	Clune Arena (798); Colorado Springs, CO
December 10, 2024*; 7:00 p.m., ESPN+		at BYU; UCCU Crosstown Clash	L 36–76	6–4	Marriott Center (2,112); Provo, UT
December 16, 2024*; 6:00 p.m., ESPN+		Jacksonville State; C-USA/WAC	W 49–45	7–4	UCCU Center (422); Orem, UT
December 20, 2024*; 6:00 p.m., ESPN+		at Weber State	W 57–55	8–4	Dee Events Center (467); Ogden, UT
WAC Conference regular season
January 4, 2025; 12:00 p.m., ESPN+		at Abilene Christian	W 64–63 ^{2OT}	9–4 (1–0)	Moody Coliseum (988); Abilene, TX
January 9, 2025; 7:00 p.m., ESPN+		at Grand Canyon	L 59–71	9–5 (1–1)	GCU Arena (1,160); Phoenix, AZ
January 11, 2025; 2:00 p.m., ESPN+		at California Baptist	L 50–77	9–6 (1–2)	Fowler Events Center (486); Riverside, CA
January 16, 2025; 6:00 p.m., ESPN+		UT Arlington	W 86–75	10–6 (2–2)	UCCU Center (483); Orem, UT
January 18, 2025; 2:00 p.m., ESPN+		at Utah Tech; Old Hammer Rivalry	W 62–46	11–6 (3–2)	Burns Arena (699); St. George, UT
January 23, 2025; 6:00 p.m., ESPN+		California Baptist	W 59–50	12–6 (4–2)	UCCU Center (509); Orem, UT
January 25, 2025; 2:00 p.m., ESPN+		Seattle	W 99–55	13–6 (5–2)	UCCU Center (577); Orem, UT
February 1, 2025; 2:00 p.m., ESPN+		Grand Canyon	L 64–76	13–7 (5–3)	Lockhart Arena (1,313); Orem, UT
February 6, 2025; 5:30 p.m., ESPN+		at UT Arlington	L 83–85	13–8 (5–4)	College Park Center (1,124); Arlington, TX
February 8, 2025; 1:00 p.m., ESPN+		at Tarleton	L 61–68	13–9 (5–5)	Wisdom Gymnasium (587); Stephenville, TX
February 15, 2025; 2:00 p.m., ESPN+		Southern Utah	L 63–72	13–10 (5–6)	Lockhart Arena (682); Orem, UT
February 19, 2025; 6:00 p.m., ESPN+		Utah Tech; Old Hammer Rivalry	W 74–51	14–10 (6–6)	UCCU Center (740); Orem, UT
February 22, 2025; 1:00 p.m., ESPN+		at Seattle	W 68–51	15–10 (7–6)	Redhawk Center (214); Seattle, WA
March 1, 2025; 6:30 p.m., ESPN+		at Southern Utah	W 53–48	16–10 (8–6)	America First Event Center (570); Cedar City, UT
March 6, 2025; 6:00 p.m., ESPN+		Abilene Christian	L 62–71	16–11 (8–7)	UCCU Center (588); Orem, UT
March 8, 2025; 2:00 p.m., ESPN+		Tarleton	W 75–58	17–11 (9–7)	UCCU Center (693); Orem, UT
WAC tournament
March 13, 2025; 1:00 p.m., ESPN+	(5)	vs. (4) Abilene Christian; Quarterfinals	W 75–65	18–11	Orleans Arena; Paradise, NV
March 14, 2025; 1:00 p.m., ESPN+	(5)	vs. (1) Grand Canyon; Semifinals	L 55–84	18–12	Orleans Arena; Paradise, NV
WNIT
March 21, 2025; 6:30 p.m., MW Network		at Air Force; Round 1	W 70–64	19–12	Clune Arena (727); Colorado Springs, CO
March 24, 2025; 7:00 p.m., ESPN+		at Washington State; Round 2	L 54–57	19–13	Beasley Coliseum (1,853); Pullman, WA
*Non-conference game. ^{#}Rankings from AP poll. (#) Tournament seedings in parentheses. All times are in Mountain.

== See also ==
- 2024–25 Utah Valley Wolverines men's basketball team
