= 2024–25 Seattle Redhawks women's basketball team =

American college basketball season

2024–25 Seattle Redhawks women's basketball
- Conference: Western Athletic Conference
- Record: 4–26 (1–15 WAC)
- Head coach: Skyler Young (2nd season)
- Assistant coaches: Matt Thune; Rachel Swartz; GeAnna Luaulu-Summers; Makala Roper
- Home arena: Redhawk Center

2024–25 WAC women's basketball standings
	Conf.				Overall
Team	W		L	PCT	W		L	PCT
Grand Canyon †	16	–	0	1.000	32	–	3	.914
Tarleton	10	–	6	.625	20	–	14	.588
UT Arlington	10	–	6	.625	18	–	14	.563
Abilene Christian	9	–	7	.563	22	–	13	.629
Utah Valley	9	–	7	.563	19	–	13	.594
California Baptist	9	–	7	.563	12	–	19	.387
Southern Utah	7	–	9	.438	9	–	21	.300
Utah Tech	1	–	15	.063	6	–	25	.194
Seattle	1	–	15	.063	4	–	26	.133
† 2025 WAC tournament winner

The 2024–25 Seattle Redhawks women's basketball team represented Seattle University during the 2024–25 NCAA Division I women's basketball season. The Redhawks, who were led by second-year head coach Skyler Young, play their home games at the Redhawk Center in Seattle, Washington, as members of the Western Athletic Conference.

This was Seattle's final season as members of the Western Athletic Conference, as they will be moving to the West Coast Conference, effective July 1, 2025.

== Previous season ==
The Redhawks finished the 2023–24 season 6–23, 6–14 in WAC play, to finish in a tie for eighth place. They failed to qualify for the WAC tournament, as only the top eight teams qualified.

== Preseason ==
On October 16, 2024, the WAC released their preseason coaches poll. Seattle was picked to finish last in the WAC regular season.

=== Preseason rankings ===
WAC preseason poll
Predicted finish	Team	Votes (1st place)
1	Grand Canyon	59 (4)
2	California Baptist	58 (4)
3	UT Arlington	53 (1)
4	Abilene Christian	37
5	Southern Utah	33
6	Tarleton State	28
7	Utah Tech	24
8	Utah Valley	17
9	Seattle	15

=== Preseason All-WAC Team ===
No Redhawks were named to the Preseason All-WAC team.

== Roster ==
2024–25 Seattle Redhawks women's basketball team
Players
Coaches

Pos.	#	Name	Height	Year	Previous school	Hometown
G	1	Julianna Walker	5 ft 6 in (1.68 m)	Sr	Syracuse	Tacoma, Washington
G	2	Taisiya Kozlova	6 ft 1 in (1.85 m)	GS	Dayton	Moscow, Russia
G	11	Olivia Moore	5 ft 9 in (1.75 m)	RS So	Long Beach State	Spokane, Washington
G	12	Nicole Benini	6 ft 0 in (1.83 m)	Fr	Liceo Scientifico Nomentano	Rome, Italy
F	14	Tamia Stricklin	6 ft 0 in (1.83 m)	RS Jr	Fresno State	Renton, Washington
G	15	Sheridan Liggett	5 ft 9 in (1.75 m)	RS So	Maple Mountain High School	Mapleton, Utah
G	22	Lucy Larson	5 ft 10 in (1.78 m)	Fr	West Seattle High School	Seattle, Washington
G	23	Candy Edokpaigbe	5 ft 11 in (1.8 m)	Fr	Istituto Tecnico Alfredo Oriani	Naples, Italy
G	24	Sydnie Rodriguez	6 ft 0 in (1.83 m)	Fr	Owyhee High School	Boise, Idaho
F	34	Christeina Bryan	6 ft 3 in (1.91 m)	GS	Georgia State	Yallahs, Jamaica
C	77	Sophie Benharouga	6 ft 2 in (1.88 m)	Sr	North Texas	Grenoble, France

Head coach

- Skyler Young (Western Michigan)

Assistant coach(es)

- Matt Thune (Indiana)
- Rachel Swartz (Missouri State)
- GeAnna Luaulu-Summers (Pacific)
- Makala Roper (UC Santa Barbara)

Legend

- (C) Team captain
- (S) Suspended
- (I) Ineligible
- (W) Walk-on
- Injured
- Current redshirt

Roster
Last update: March 15, 2025

== Schedule and results ==
Date time, TV	Rank^{#}	Opponent^{#}	Result	Record	High points	High rebounds	High assists	Site (attendance) city, state
Exhibition
October 28, 2024*; 6:00 pm		Saint Martin's	W 63–55	–	–	–	–	Redhawk Center; Seattle, WA
Non-conference regular season
November 4, 2024*; 6:00 pm, B1G+		at Washington	L 53–95	0–1	11 – Edokpaigbe	9 – Bryan	2 – Liggett	Alaska Airlines Arena (1,711); Seattle, WA
November 9, 2024*; 4:30 pm, ESPN+		at Sam Houston; WAC/C-USA Challenge	L 57–69	0–2	16 – Edokpaigbe	6 – Bryan	4 – Liggett	Bernard Johnson Coliseum (174); Huntsville, TX
November 16, 2024*; 6:00 pm, ESPN+		Portland State	L 57–67	0–3	19 – Bryan	6 – Edokpaigbe	4 – Liggett	Redhawk Center (536); Seattle, WA
November 19, 2024*; 6:00 pm, ESPN+		at Portland	L 55–78	0–4	16 – Edokpaigbe	5 – Tied	3 – Tied	Chiles Center (415); Portland, OR
November 23, 2024*; 1:00 pm, ESPN+		Evergreen State	W 88–43	1–4	17 – Tied	7 – Tied	6 – Liggett	Redhawk Center (164); Seattle, WA
November 29, 2024*; 11:00 am		vs. East Texas A&M; GCU Thanksgiving Classic	W 79–76	2–4	16 – Bryan	11 – Stricklin	7 – Moore	Global Credit Union Arena (102); Phoenix, AZ
November 30, 2024*; 11:00 am		vs. UC Santa Barbara; GCU Thanksgiving Classic	L 62–72	2–5	16 – Kozlova	10 – Kozlova	5 – Liggett	Global Credit Union Arena (131); Phoenix, AZ
December 2, 2024*; 5:00 pm, ESPN+		at Arizona	L 43–78	2–6	10 – Benharouga	5 – Tied	2 – Tied	McKale Center (6,191); Tucson, AZ
December 7, 2024*; 12:00 pm, MWN		at Air Force	L 44–82	2–7	12 – Bryan	8 – Bryan	3 – Liggett	Clune Arena (613); Colorado Springs, CO
December 14, 2024*; 1:00 pm, ESPN+		Weber State	L 64–72	2–8	20 – Edokpaigbe	7 – Tied	3 – Moore	Redhawk Center (247); Seattle, WA
December 16, 2024*; 6:00 pm, ESPN+		Kennesaw State; WAC/C-USA Challenge	L 41–64	2–9	10 – Bryan	7 – Bryan	3 – Liggett	Redhawk Center (143); Seattle, WA
December 20, 2024*; 2:00 pm, ESPN+		at Cal Poly	L 42–67	2–10	13 – Benharouga	7 – Benharouga	2 – Tied	Mott Athletics Center (495); San Luis Obispo, CA
December 29, 2024*; 2:00 pm, ESPN+		at Cal State Bakersfield	W 58–49	3–10	21 – Stricklin	10 – Benharouga	3 – Stricklin	Icardo Center (307); Bakersfield, CA
WAC regular season
January 4, 2025; 1:00 pm, ESPN+		California Baptist	L 64–70	3–11 (0–1)	17 – Tied	8 – Edokpaigbe	3 – Walker	Redhawk Center (243); Seattle, WA
January 11, 2025; 11:00 am, ESPN+		at Abilene Christian	L 55–83	3–12 (0–2)	15 – Edokpaigbe	8 – Bryan	6 – Liggett	Moody Coliseum (703); Abilene, TX
January 16, 2025; 6:00 pm, ESPN+		at Utah Tech	L 70–80	3–13 (0–3)	23 – Bryan	8 – Stricklin	3 – Tied	Burns Arena (543); St. George, UT
January 18, 2025; 1:00 pm, ESPN+		at Southern Utah	L 57–61	3–14 (0–4)	14 – Contreras	8 – Stricklin	2 – Tied	America First Event Center (414); Cedar City, UT
January 23, 2025; 6:00 pm, ESPN+		UT Arlington	L 58–70	3–15 (0–5)	14 – Moore	13 – Bryan	3 – Tied	Redhawk Center (275); Seattle, WA
January 25, 2025; 1:00 pm, ESPN+		at Utah Valley	L 55–99	3–16 (0–6)	14 – Walker	6 – Tied	5 – Tied	UCCU Center (577); Orem, UT
January 30, 2025; 11:00 am, ESPN+		Grand Canyon	L 50–88	3–17 (0–7)	13 – Rodriguez	7 – Bryan	2 – Tied	Redhawk Center (396); Seattle, WA
February 6, 2025; 5:00 pm, ESPN+		at Tarleton State	L 46–77	3–18 (0–8)	17 – Stricklin	7 – Bryan	4 – Stricklin	Wisdom Gym (712); Stephenville, TX
February 8, 2025; 12:00 pm, ESPN+		at UT Arlington	L 54–80	3–19 (0–9)	11 – Tied	5 – Rodriguez	3 – Tied	College Park Center (904); Arlington, TX
February 13, 2025; 6:00 pm, ESPN+		Abilene Christian	L 62–84	3–20 (0–10)	15 – Tied	11 – Edokpaigbe	4 – Moore	Redhawk Center (162); Seattle, WA
February 15, 2025; 1:00 pm, ESPN+		Tarleton State	L 76–79	3–21 (0–11)	21 – Edokpaigbe	8 – Edokpaigbe	3 – Bryan	Redhawk Center (144); Seattle, WA
February 22, 2025; 12:00 pm, ESPN+		Utah Valley	L 51–68	3–22 (0–12)	12 – Edokpaigbe	8 – Edokpaigbe	4 – Edokpaigbe	Redhawk Center (214); Seattle, WA
February 27, 2025; 6:00 pm, ESPN+		at California Baptist	L 68–81	3–23 (0–13)	19 – Edokpaigbe	6 – Tied	5 – Moore	Fowler Events Center (472); Riverside, CA
March 1, 2025; 1:00 pm, ESPN+		at Grand Canyon	L 52–82	3–24 (0–14)	13 – Edokpaigbe	7 – Bryan	3 – Tied	Global Credit Union Arena (1,156); Phoenix, AZ
March 6, 2025; 6:00 pm, ESPN+		Southern Utah	L 51–66	3–25 (0–15)	15 – Moore	8 – Stricklin	4 – Stricklin	Redhawk Center (212); Seattle, WA
March 8, 2025; 1:00 pm, ESPN+		Utah Tech	W 69–65	4–25 (1–15)	16 – Walker	10 – Edokpaigbe	5 – Liggett	Redhawk Center (706); Seattle, WA
WAC tournament
March 11, 2025; 11:00 am, ESPN+	(9)	at (8) Utah Tech; First Round	L 60–74	4–26	17 – Bryan	7 – Stricklin	4 – Edokpaigbe	Burns Arena (233); St. George, UT
*Non-conference game. ^{#}Rankings from AP poll. (#) Tournament seedings in parentheses. All times are in Pacific.
