= 2024–25 Abilene Christian Wildcats women's basketball team =

American college basketball season

2024–25 Abilene Christian Wildcats women's basketball

WNIT, Super 16
- Conference: Western Athletic Conference
- Record: 22–13 (9–7 WAC)
- Head coach: Julie Goodenough (13th season)
- Assistant coaches: Yannick Denson; Tatum Veitenheimer; Chris Garcia
- Home arena: Moody Coliseum

2024–25 WAC women's basketball standings
| | Conf. | | | | Overall |
| Team | W | | L | PCT | W | | L | PCT |
|---|---|---|---|---|---|---|---|---|
| Grand Canyon † | 16 | – | 0 | 1.000 | 32 | – | 3 | .914 |
| Tarleton | 10 | – | 6 | .625 | 20 | – | 14 | .588 |
| UT Arlington | 10 | – | 6 | .625 | 18 | – | 14 | .563 |
| Abilene Christian | 9 | – | 7 | .563 | 22 | – | 13 | .629 |
| Utah Valley | 9 | – | 7 | .563 | 19 | – | 13 | .594 |
| California Baptist | 9 | – | 7 | .563 | 12 | – | 19 | .387 |
| Southern Utah | 7 | – | 9 | .438 | 9 | – | 21 | .300 |
| Utah Tech | 1 | – | 15 | .063 | 6 | – | 25 | .194 |
| Seattle | 1 | – | 15 | .063 | 4 | – | 26 | .133 |
† 2025 WAC tournament winner

The 2024–25 Abilene Christian Wildcats women's basketball team represented Abilene Christian University during the 2024–25 NCAA Division I women's basketball season. The Wildcats, led by 13th-year head coach Julie Goodenough, played their home games at Moody Coliseum in Abilene, Texas as members of the Western Athletic Conference.

== Previous season ==
The Wildcats finished the 2023–24 season 14–16, 10–10 in WAC play, to finish in sixth place. They were defeated by Tarleton State in the first round of the WAC tournament.

== Preseason ==
On October 16, 2024, the WAC released their preseason coaches poll. Abilene Christian was picked to finish fourth in the WAC regular season.

=== Preseason rankings ===
WAC preseason poll
| Predicted finish | Team | Votes (1st place) |
|---|---|---|
| 1 | Grand Canyon | 59 (4) |
| 2 | California Baptist | 58 (4) |
| 3 | UT Arlington | 53 (1) |
| 4 | Abilene Christian | 37 |
| 5 | Southern Utah | 33 |
| 6 | Tarleton State | 28 |
| 7 | Utah Tech | 24 |
| 8 | Utah Valley | 17 |
| 9 | Seattle | 15 |

=== Preseason All-WAC Team ===
Preseason All-WAC Team
| Player | Position | Year |
|---|---|---|
| Payton Hull | Guard | Sophomore |

== Roster ==
2024–25 Abilene Christian Wildcats women's basketball team
Players
Coaches

| Pos. | # | Name | Height | Year | Previous school | Hometown |
|---|---|---|---|---|---|---|
| G | 2 | Natalia Chavez | 5 ft 11 in (1.8 m) | Jr | New Mexico | Cochiti, New Mexico |
| G | 3 | Bella Earle | 5 ft 10 in (1.78 m) | Sr | Denton Guyer High School | Corinth, Texas |
| G | 4 | Erin Woodson | 6 ft 0 in (1.83 m) | So | Purdue Fort Wayne | Richmond, Virginia |
| G | 5 | Breanna Davis | 5 ft 6 in (1.68 m) | Jr | North Texas | Red Oak, Texas |
| G | 10 | Payton Hull | 5 ft 10 in (1.78 m) | So | Peaster High School | Peaster, Texas |
| G | 11 | Mia Rivers | 5 ft 6 in (1.68 m) | GS | Texas A&M–Kingsville | College Station, Texas |
| F | 12 | Carlota Gomez | 5 ft 11 in (1.8 m) | Jr | Monroe College | Madrid, Spain |
| G | 13 | Zoe Jackson | 5 ft 7 in (1.7 m) | Sr | Butler | McKinney, Texas |
| C | 14 | Meredith Mayes | 6 ft 2 in (1.88 m) | So | Bixby High School | Bixby, Oklahoma |
| G | 22 | Paula Pique | 6 ft 1 in (1.85 m) | Fr | Institut Llavaneres | Sant Andreu de Llavaneres, Spain |
| F | 24 | Emma Troxell | 5 ft 11 in (1.8 m) | So | Bushland High School | Bushland, Texas |
| C | 41 | Aimee Flippen | 6 ft 4 in (1.93 m) | Fr | Glen Rose High School | Glen Rose, Texas |

Head coach

- Julie Goodenough (UT Arlington)

Assistant coach(es)

- Yannick Denson (Lamar)
- Tatum Veitenheimer (Texas Tech)
- Chris Garcia (Abilene Christian)

Legend

- (C) Team captain
- (S) Suspended
- (I) Ineligible
- (W) Walk-on
- Injured
- Current redshirt

Roster
Last update: March 10, 2025

== Schedule and results ==
| Date time, TV | Rank^{#} | Opponent^{#} | Result | Record | High points | High rebounds | High assists | Site (attendance) city, state |
Non-conference regular season
| November 4, 2024*; 5:30 pm, ESPN+ | | Southwest | W 95–38 | 1–0 | 23 – Hull | 7 – Tied | 5 – Tied | Moody Coliseum (652); Abilene, TX |
| November 8, 2024*; 6:00 pm, ESPN+ | | at FIU; WAC/C-USA Challenge | W 76–73 | 2–0 | 26 – Earle | 7 – Hull | 5 – Rivers | Ocean Bank Convocation Center (501); Miami, FL |
| November 12, 2024*; 11:00 am, ESPN+ | | Stephen F. Austin | L 65–68 | 2–1 | 20 – Mayes | 7 – Mayes | 3 – Hull | Moody Coliseum (2,207); Abilene, TX |
| November 16, 2024*; 12:00 pm, ESPN+ | | North Texas | L 60–71 | 2–2 | 21 – Hull | 10 – Earle | 5 – Earle | Moody Coliseum (709); Abilene, TX |
| November 19, 2024*; 6:00 pm, ESPN+ | | at Texas Tech | L 40–66 | 2–3 | 13 – Hull | 5 – Tied | 3 – Earle | United Supermarkets Arena (3,907); Lubbock, TX |
| November 21, 2024*; 6:00 pm, ESPN+ | | Western Kentucky; WAC/C-USA Challenge | L 64–68 | 2–4 | 27 – Hull | 12 – Troxell | 4 – Earle | Moody Coliseum (624); Abilene, TX |
| November 24, 2024*; 1:00 pm, ESPN+ | | at Incarnate Word | W 61–53 | 3–4 | 18 – Troxell | 11 – Troxell | 4 – Tied | McDermott Center (123); San Antonio, TX |
| November 29, 2024*; 1:00 pm, ESPN+ | | vs. Sacramento State; FIU Thanksgiving Classic | W 75–53 | 4–4 | 25 – Hull | 5 – Earle | 4 – Davis | Ocean Bank Convocation Center; Miami, FL |
| December 1, 2024*; 12:00 pm, ESPN+ | | at FIU; FIU Thanksgiving Classic | W 87–67 | 5–4 | 29 – Hull | 6 – Mayes | 7 – Rivers | Ocean Bank Convocation Center (467); Miami, FL |
| December 4, 2024*; 6:30 pm, ESPN+ | | at UT Rio Grande Valley | W 59–45 | 6–4 | 16 – Hull | 10 – Mayes | 7 – Earle | UTRGV Fieldhouse (488); Edinburg, TX |
| December 7, 2024*; 1:00 pm, ESPN+ | | East Texas A&M | W 74–59 | 7–4 | 17 – Hull | 11 – Mayes | 4 – Tied | Moody Coliseum (348); Abilene, TX |
| December 17, 2024*; 6:00 pm, ESPN+ | | Howard Payne | W 108–35 | 8–4 | 19 – Hull | 13 – Earle | 5 – Earle | Moody Coliseum (728); Abilene, TX |
| December 20, 2024*; 3:00 pm, MWN | | vs. Sacramento State; Lobo Invitational | W 80–49 | 9–4 | 16 – Hull | 7 – Troxell | 4 – Earle | The Pit; Albuquerque, NM |
| December 21, 2024*; 2:00 pm, MWN | | at New Mexico; Lobo Invitational | W 77–69 | 10–4 | 29 – Hull | 8 – Earle | 4 – Tied | The Pit (4,672); Albuquerque, NM |
| December 30, 2024*; 1:00 pm, ESPN+ | | Nelson | W 87–40 | 11–4 | 17 – Tied | 10 – Earle | 5 – Hull | Moody Coliseum (705); Abilene, TX |
WAC regular season
| January 4, 2025; 1:00 pm, ESPN+ | | Utah Valley | L 63–64 ^{2OT} | 11–5 (0–1) | 17 – Hull | 9 – Mayes | 7 – Earle | Moody Coliseum (988); Abilene, TX |
| January 11, 2025; 1:00 pm, ESPN+ | | Seattle | W 83–55 | 12–5 (1–1) | 23 – Earle | 8 – Troxell | 6 – Earle | Moody Coliseum (703); Abilene, TX |
| January 16, 2025; 6:00 pm, ESPN+ | | Grand Canyon | L 67–81 | 12–6 (1–2) | 26 – Earle | 8 – Earle | 4 – Earle | Moody Coliseum (504); Abilene, TX |
| January 18, 2025; 3:00 pm, ESPN+ | | at California Baptist | W 71–55 | 13–6 (2–2) | 24 – Mayes | 11 – Earle | 5 – Davis | Fowler Events Center (413); Riverside, CA |
| January 23, 2025; 7:00 pm, ESPN+ | | at Tarleton State | L 54–79 | 13–7 (2–3) | 16 – Tied | 7 – Earle | 4 – Tied | Wisdom Gym (1,234); Stephenville, TX |
| January 25, 2025; 2:00 pm, ESPN+ | | at UT Arlington | L 52–71 | 13–8 (2–4) | 14 – Mayes | 10 – Mayes | 5 – Davis | College Park Center; Arlington, TX |
| January 30, 2025; 6:00 pm, ESPN+ | | California Baptist | L 84–87 | 13–9 (2–5) | 23 – Woodson | 13 – Earle | 7 – Earle | Moody Coliseum (673); Abilene, TX |
| February 6, 2025; 6:00 pm, ESPN+ | | Utah Tech | W 84–66 | 14–9 (3–5) | 19 – Troxell | 12 – Mayes | 7 – Earle | Moody Coliseum (723); Abilene, TX |
| February 8, 2025; 1:00 pm, ESPN+ | | Southern Utah | W 74–52 | 15–9 (4–5) | 23 – Earle | 9 – Tied | 3 – Earle | Moody Coliseum (960); Abilene, TX |
| February 13, 2025; 8:00 pm, ESPN+ | | at Seattle | W 84–62 | 16–9 (5–5) | 17 – Tied | 9 – Mayes | 5 – Davis | Redhawk Center (162); Seattle, WA |
| February 19, 2025; 7:30 pm, ESPN+ | | at Southern Utah | L 46–49 | 16–10 (5–6) | 21 – Mayes | 12 – Mayes | 5 – Earle | America First Event Center (480); Cedar City, UT |
| February 22, 2025; 3:00 pm, ESPN+ | | at Utah Tech | W 71–60 | 17–10 (6–6) | 24 – Mayes | 9 – Earle | 8 – Earle | Burns Arena (386); St. George, UT |
| February 27, 2025; 6:00 pm, ESPN+ | | Tarleton State | W 59–56 | 18–10 (7–6) | 14 – Mayes | 6 – Mayes | 3 – Jackson | Moody Coliseum (759); Abilene, TX |
| March 1, 2025; 1:00 pm, ESPN+ | | UT Arlington | W 81–74 | 19–10 (8–6) | 22 – Earle | 11 – Mayes | 6 – Woodson | Moody Coliseum (692); Abilene, TX |
| March 6, 2025; 7:00 pm, ESPN+ | | at Utah Valley | W 71–62 | 20–10 (9–6) | 26 – Earle | 11 – Earle | 4 – Tied | UCCU Center (588); Orem, UT |
| March 8, 2025; 3:00 pm, ESPN+ | | at Grand Canyon | L 57–70 | 20–11 (9–7) | 11 – Davis | 6 – Tied | 5 – Earle | Global Credit Union Arena (1,447); Phoenix, AZ |
WAC tournament
| March 13, 2025; 2:00 pm, ESPN+ | (4) | vs. (5) Utah Valley; Quarterfinals | L 65–75 | 20–12 | 20 – Troxell | 6 – Hull | 4 – Hull | Orleans Arena; Paradise, NV |
WNIT
| March 20, 2025*; 6:00 pm, ESPN+ | | Northwestern State; First Round | W 86–59 | 21–12 | 21 – Woodson | 9 – Troxell | 4 – Hull | Moody Coliseum (437); Abilene, TX |
| March 24, 2025*; 6:30 pm, ESPN+ | | at Central Arkansas; Second Round | W 75–53 | 22–12 | 28 – Hull | 9 – Mayes | 3 – Tied | Farris Center (475); Conway, AR |
| March 27, 2025*; 6:30 p.m., YouTube | | at Illinois State; Super 16 | L 68–78 | 22–13 | 25 – Hull | 5 – Tied | 7 – Earle | Shirk Center (1,380); Bloomington, IL |
*Non-conference game. ^{#}Rankings from AP poll. (#) Tournament seedings in parentheses. All times are in Central.
