= 2024–25 Grand Canyon Antelopes women's basketball team =

American college basketball season

2024–25 Grand Canyon Antelopes women's basketball

WAC regular season and tournament champions

NCAA tournament, First Round
- Conference: Western Athletic Conference
- Record: 32–3 (16–0 WAC)
- Head coach: Molly Miller (5th season)
- Associate head coach: Jason Glover; Laura Dinkins
- Assistant coaches: Bryan Camacho; Daejah Bernard; Ashleigh Lopez
- Home arena: Global Credit Union Arena

2024–25 WAC women's basketball standings
	Conf.				Overall
Team	W		L	PCT	W		L	PCT
Grand Canyon †	16	–	0	1.000	32	–	3	.914
Tarleton	10	–	6	.625	20	–	14	.588
UT Arlington	10	–	6	.625	18	–	14	.563
Abilene Christian	9	–	7	.563	22	–	13	.629
Utah Valley	9	–	7	.563	19	–	13	.594
California Baptist	9	–	7	.563	12	–	19	.387
Southern Utah	7	–	9	.438	9	–	21	.300
Utah Tech	1	–	15	.063	6	–	25	.194
Seattle	1	–	15	.063	4	–	26	.133
† 2025 WAC tournament winner

The 2024–25 Grand Canyon Antelopes women's basketball team represented Grand Canyon University during the 2024–25 NCAA Division I women's basketball season. The Antelopes, who were led by fifth-year head coach Molly Miller, played their home games at Global Credit Union Arena in Phoenix, Arizona as members of the Western Athletic Conference.

== Previous season ==
The Antelopes finished the 2023–24 season 24–8, 16–4 in WAC play, to finish in second place. They were defeated by Stephen F. Austin in the semifinals of the WAC tournament.

== Preseason ==
On October 16, 2024, the WAC released their preseason coaches poll. Grand Canyon was picked to finish first in the WAC regular season.

=== Preseason rankings ===
WAC preseason poll
Predicted finish	Team	Votes (1st place)
1	Grand Canyon	59 (4)
2	California Baptist	58 (4)
3	UT Arlington	53 (1)
4	Abilene Christian	37
5	Southern Utah	33
6	Tarleton State	28
7	Utah Tech	24
8	Utah Valley	17
9	Seattle	15

=== WAC Preseason Player of the Year ===
WAC Preseason Player of the Year
Player	Position	Year
Trinity San Antonio	Guard	Senior

=== Preseason All-WAC Team ===
Preseason All-WAC Team
Player	Position	Year
Tiarra Brown	Guard/Forward	Graduate student
Trinity San Antonio	Guard	Senior

== Roster ==
2024–25 Grand Canyon Antelopes women's basketball team
Players
Coaches

Pos.	#	Name	Height	Year	Previous school	Hometown
G	0	Callie Cooper	5 ft 6 in (1.68 m)	Sr	UC Santa Barbara	Richardson, Texas
G	1	Kristyna Jeskeova	6 ft 2 in (1.88 m)	Sr	Long Beach State	Jablonec nad Nisou, Czech Republic
G	2	Asha Sra	5 ft 9 in (1.75 m)	RS So	Clovis North High School	Fresno, California
G	3	Ale'jah Douglas	5 ft 6 in (1.68 m)	Sr	Oklahoma State	North Omaha, Nebraska
F	4	Nneka Obiazor	5 ft 10 in (1.78 m)	GS	UNLV	Eden Prairie, Minnesota
F	10	Bridget Mullings	6 ft 3 in (1.91 m)	Sr	Utah State	Phoenix, Arizona
G	11	Sydney Erikstrup	6 ft 1 in (1.85 m)	GS	Arizona State	Portland, Oregon
G	12	Alyssa Durazo-Frescas	5 ft 7 in (1.7 m)	Sr	UNLV	Newport Beach, California
G	14	Anna Ostlie	5 ft 8 in (1.73 m)	GS	Boise State	Scottsdale, Arizona
G	20	Laura Erikstrup	6 ft 2 in (1.88 m)	GS	San Diego	Portland, Oregon
G	22	Kaitlyn Elsholz	5 ft 11 in (1.8 m)	So	Cal State Northridge	Peoria, Arizona
G	23	Trinity San Antonio	5 ft 10 in (1.78 m)	Sr	California Baptist	Moreno Valley, California
G/F	24	Tiarra Brown	5 ft 9 in (1.75 m)	GS	Bethel High School	Spanaway, Washington
G	25	Naomi White	5 ft 9 in (1.75 m)	Fr	Bellevue West High School	Omaha, Nebraska
F	42	Lucy Ghaifan	6 ft 0 in (1.83 m)	So	Omaha	Grand Island, Nebraska

Head coach

- Molly Miller (Drury)

Assistant coach(es)

- Laura Dinkins (Northern Arizona)
- Bryan Camacho (UCLA)
- Daejah Bernard (Drury)
- Ashleigh Lopez (UT Rio Grande Valley)

Legend

- (C) Team captain
- (S) Suspended
- (I) Ineligible
- (W) Walk-on
- Injured
- Current redshirt

Roster
Last update: March 8, 2025

== Schedule and results ==
Date time, TV	Rank^{#}	Opponent^{#}	Result	Record	High points	High rebounds	High assists	Site (attendance) city, state
Exhibition
October 30, 2024*; 6:00 pm		Benedictine Mesa	W 94–40	–	16 – Tied	5 – Tied	5 – Brown	Global Credit Union Arena (419); Phoenix, AZ
Non-conference regular season
November 4, 2024*; 4:00 pm, ESPN+		Cal State Bakersfield	W 93–52	1–0	19 – Obiazor	7 – Obiazor	5 – San Antonio	Global Credit Union Arena (552); Phoenix, AZ
November 8, 2024*; 5:30 pm, ESPN+		at Middle Tennessee; WAC/C-USA Challenge	L 47–57	1–1	20 – L. Erikstrup	7 – L. Erikstrup	4 – Tied	Murphy Center (3,712); Murfreesboro, TN
November 14, 2024*; 4:30 pm, ESPN+		vs. Arizona State; Hall of Fame Series	W 70–59	2–1	22 – Durazo-Frescas	9 – San Antonio	4 – Tied	Footprint Center; Phoenix, AZ
November 18, 2024*; 7:00 pm, B1G+		at No. 23 Oregon	L 54–70	2–2	18 – San Antonio	6 – San Antonio	5 – San Antonio	Matthew Knight Arena (4,518); Eugene, OR
November 27, 2024*; 11:30 am, ESPN+		Liberty; WAC/C-USA Challenge	W 79–50	3–2	21 – San Antonio	7 – L. Erikstrup	17 – San Antonio	Global Credit Union Arena (534); Phoenix, AZ
November 29, 2024*; 2:30 pm, ESPN+		UC Santa Barbara; Talking Stick Resort Thanksgiving Classic	W 69–58	4–2	18 – L. Erikstrup	8 – L. Erikstrup	6 – San Antonio	Global Credit Union Arena (482); Phoenix, AZ
November 30, 2024*; 2:30 pm, ESPN+		East Texas A&M; Talking Stick Resort Thanksgiving Classic	W 110–71	5–2	20 – Durazo-Frescas	8 – Ghaifan	11 – Cooper	Global Credit Union Arena (398); Phoenix, AZ
December 5, 2024*; 6:00 pm, ESPN+		at Arizona	W 69–66	6–2	26 – San Antonio	12 – San Antonio	4 – Tied	McKale Center (6,292); Tucson, AZ
December 8, 2024*; 1:00 pm, ESPN+		Utah State	W 76–62	7–2	18 – Brown	6 – L. Erikstrup	8 – San Antonio	Global Credit Union Arena (511); Phoenix, AZ
December 14, 2024*; 6:00 pm, ESPN+		Westcliff	W 90–31	8–2	23 – Durazo-Frescas	9 – Obiazor	5 – L. Erikstrup	Global Credit Union Arena (407); Phoenix, AZ
December 18, 2024*; 2:30 pm, ESPN+		Wright State; Have Fayth Christmas Classic	W 82–69	9–2	20 – L. Erikstrup	14 – L. Erikstrup	10 – San Antonio	Global Credit Union Arena (298); Phoenix, AZ
December 19, 2024*; 2:30 pm, ESPN+		Florida Atlantic; Have Fayth Christmas Classic	W 81–60	10–2	22 – Durazo-Frescas	10 – L. Erikstrup	5 – Cooper	Global Credit Union Arena (134); Phoenix, AZ
December 21, 2024*; 12:30 pm, ESPN+		Georgia Southern; Have Fayth Christmas Classic	W 79–52	11–2	20 – Obiazor	5 – Durazo-Frescas	6 – San Antonio	Global Credit Union Arena (512); Phoenix, AZ
December 27, 2024*; 6:00 pm, ESPN+		Park–Gilbert	W 108–44	12–2	27 – Durazo-Frescas	12 – L. Erikstrup	9 – Cooper	Global Credit Union Arena (325); Phoenix, AZ
December 29, 2024*; 2:00 pm, ESPN+		Northern Arizona	W 79–70	13–2	19 – Brown	7 – Tied	7 – San Antonio	Global Credit Union Arena (1,689); Phoenix, AZ
WAC regular season
January 4, 2025; 2:00 pm, ESPN+		at Southern Utah	W 75–57	14–2 (1–0)	21 – Durazo-Frescas	9 – Brown	5 – Tied	America First Event Center (346); Cedar City, UT
January 9, 2025; 6:00 pm, Fox 10 Xtra/ESPN+		Utah Valley	W 71–59	15–2 (2–0)	22 – L. Erikstrup	10 – L. Erikstrup	3 – Ostlie	Global Credit Union Arena (1,160); Phoenix, AZ
January 16, 2025; 5:00 pm, ESPN+		at Abilene Christian	W 81–67	16–2 (3–0)	25 – San Antonio	13 – L. Erikstrup	5 – San Antonio	Moody Coliseum (504); Abilene, TX
January 18, 2025; 6:00 pm, ESPN+		at Tarleton State	W 57–53	17–2 (4–0)	20 – L. Erikstrup	9 – Jeskeova	3 – San Antonio	Wisdom Gym (1,009); Stephenville, TX
January 23, 2025; 6:00 pm, ESPN+		Southern Utah	W 79–51	18–2 (5–0)	21 – San Antonio	5 – Tied	6 – Cooper	Global Credit Union Arena (698); Phoenix, AZ
January 25, 2025; 2:00 pm, Fox 10 Xtra/ESPN+		Utah Tech	W 78–43	19–2 (6–0)	18 – Ostlie	11 – L. Erikstrup	8 – San Antonio	Global Credit Union Arena (1,584); Phoenix, AZ
January 30, 2025; 12:00 pm, ESPN+		at Seattle	W 88–50	20–2 (7–0)	17 – San Antonio	6 – Tied	7 – Brown	Redhawk Center (396); Seattle, WA
February 1, 2025; 2:00 pm, ESPN+		at Utah Valley	W 76–64	21–2 (8–0)	21 – San Antonio	5 – L. Erikstrup	9 – San Antonio	Lockhart Arena (1,313); Orem, UT
February 8, 2025; 2:00 pm, ESPN+		at California Baptist	W 84–55	22–2 (9–0)	22 – Brown	13 – L. Erikstrup	5 – Tied	Global Credit Union Arena (923); Phoenix, AZ
February 13, 2025; 6:00 pm, ESPN+		Tarleton State	W 76–60	23–2 (10–0)	27 – San Antonio	6 – Tied	6 – Cooper	Global Credit Union Arena (604); Phoenix, AZ
February 15, 2025; 2:00 pm, ESPN+		UT Arlington	W 82–69	24–2 (11–0)	26 – Brown	6 – Tied	8 – San Antonio	Global Credit Union Arena (874); Phoenix, AZ
February 22, 2025; 2:00 pm, ESPN+		at California Baptist	W 74–56	25–2 (12–0)	21 – Durazo-Frescas	5 – Tied	6 – San Antonio	Fowler Events Center (720); Riverside, CA
February 27, 2025; 5:30 pm, ESPN+		at UT Arlington	W 72–59	26–2 (13–0)	19 – Durazo-Frescas	12 – L. Erikstrup	6 – San Antonio	College Park Center (1,247); Arlington, TX
March 1, 2025; 2:00 pm, ESPN+		Seattle	W 82–52	27–2 (14–0)	21 – San Antonio	5 – Tied	4 – Brown	Global Credit Union Arena (1,156); Phoenix, AZ
March 6, 2025; 7:00 pm, ESPN+		at Utah Tech	W 74–42	28–2 (15–0)	14 – Tied	11 – Brown	4 – San Antonio	Burns Arena (700); St. George, UT
March 8, 2025; 2:00 pm, ESPN+		Abilene Christian	W 70–57	29–2 (16–0)	16 – L. Erikstrup	8 – L. Erikstrup	10 – San Antonio	Global Credit Union Arena (1,447); Phoenix, AZ
WAC tournament
March 12, 2025; 12:00 pm, ESPN+	(1)	vs. (8) Utah Tech; Quarterfinals	W 71–47	30–2	28 – Durazo-Frescas	6 – L. Erikstrup	4 – San Antonio	Orleans Arena; Paradise, NV
March 14, 2025; 12:00 pm, ESPN+	(1)	vs. (5) Utah Valley; Semifinals	W 84–55	31–2	28 – Durazo-Frescas	6 – L. Erikstrup	4 – San Antonio	Orleans Arena; Paradise, NV
March 15, 2025; 12:30 pm, ESPNU	(1)	vs. (3) UT Arlington; Championship	W 65–62	32–2	19 – San Antonio	8 – Brown	9 – San Antonio	Orleans Arena; Paradise, NV
NCAA tournament
March 21, 2025*; 12:30 p.m., ESPNU	(13 S1)	at (4 S2) No. 14 Baylor; First Round	L 60–73	32–3	27 – San Antonio	8 – Brown	2 – Tied	Foster Pavilion; Waco, TX
*Non-conference game. ^{#}Rankings from AP poll. (#) Tournament seedings in parentheses. S1=Spokane 1. All times are in Mountain.
