= 2024–25 UT Arlington Mavericks women's basketball team =

American college basketball season

2024–25 UT Arlington Mavericks women's basketball

WNIT, Second Round
- Conference: Western Athletic Conference
- Record: 18–14 (10–6 WAC)
- Head coach: Shereka Wright (5th season)
- Assistant coaches: Rosalyn Tindel; David Pierre Jr.; KaeLynn Boyd
- Home arena: College Park Center

2024–25 WAC women's basketball standings
	Conf.				Overall
Team	W		L	PCT	W		L	PCT
Grand Canyon †	16	–	0	1.000	32	–	3	.914
Tarleton	10	–	6	.625	20	–	14	.588
UT Arlington	10	–	6	.625	18	–	14	.563
Abilene Christian	9	–	7	.563	22	–	13	.629
Utah Valley	9	–	7	.563	19	–	13	.594
California Baptist	9	–	7	.563	12	–	19	.387
Southern Utah	7	–	9	.438	9	–	21	.300
Utah Tech	1	–	15	.063	6	–	25	.194
Seattle	1	–	15	.063	4	–	26	.133
† 2025 WAC tournament winner

The 2024–25 UT Arlington Mavericks women's basketball team represented the University of Texas at Arlington during the 2024–25 NCAA Division I women's basketball season. The Mavericks, led by fifth-year head coach Shereka Wright, played their home games at College Park Center in Arlington, Texas as members of the Western Athletic Conference.

== Previous season ==
The Mavericks finished the 2023–24 season 17–16, 11–9 in WAC play, to finish in fifth place. They defeated Southern Utah, and Utah Tech, before falling to top-seeded and eventual tournament champions California Baptist in the semifinals of the WAC tournament.

== Preseason ==
On October 16, 2024, the WAC released their preseason coaches poll. UT Arlington was picked to finish third in the WAC regular season.

=== Preseason rankings ===
WAC preseason poll
Predicted finish	Team	Votes (1st place)
1	Grand Canyon	59 (4)
2	California Baptist	58 (4)
3	UT Arlington	53 (1)
4	Abilene Christian	37
5	Southern Utah	33
6	Tarleton State	28
7	Utah Tech	24
8	Utah Valley	17
9	Seattle	15

=== Preseason All-WAC Team ===
Preseason All-WAC Team
Player	Position	Year
Avery Brittingham	Forward	Fifth year

== Roster ==
2024–25 UT Arlington Mavericks women's basketball team
Players
Coaches

Pos.	#	Name	Height	Year	Previous school	Hometown
G	0	Kali Haizlip	5 ft 9 in (1.75 m)	Jr	College of Southern Idaho	Puyallup, Washington
G	1	Aspen Thornton	5 ft 7 in (1.7 m)	Sr	Abilene Christian	Hot Springs, Arkansas
G	2	Kendal Robinson	5 ft 10 in (1.78 m)	Fr	North Crowley High School	Fort Worth, Texas
F	4	Laura Bello	6 ft 3 in (1.91 m)	Sr	Idaho State	Dublin, Ireland
G	5	Nya Threatt	5 ft 6 in (1.68 m)	Jr	Dulles High School	Missouri City, Texas
F	6	Avery Brittingham (5Y)	6 ft 1 in (1.85 m)	Sr	Stephen F. Austin	Fort Worth, Texas
F	7	Zoe Nelson	6 ft 2 in (1.88 m)	Sr	Stephen F. Austin	Austin, Texas
F	8	Koi Love (5Y)	6 ft 0 in (1.83 m)	Sr	USC	Orlando, Florida
G	14	Aubrey Reid	5 ft 11 in (1.8 m)	RS Fr	Austin High School	Austin, Texas
G	20	Alexsyah Goudeau	5 ft 10 in (1.78 m)	Jr	Tahlequah High School	Tahlequah, Oklahoma
G	23	Taliyah Clark	5 ft 11 in (1.8 m)	Sr	Seattle	Lynnwood, Washington
F	24	Miraya Perkins	5 ft 11 in (1.8 m)	So	Boswell High School	Dallas, Texas
F	32	Jamaya Perry	6 ft 1 in (1.85 m)	RS Fr	St. Mary's High School	Stockton, California

Head coach

- Shereka Wright (Purdue)

Assistant coach(es)

- Rosalyn Tindel (Midwestern State)
- David Pierre Jr. (Grambling State)
- KaeLynn Boyd (Southeastern Louisiana)

Legend

- (C) Team captain
- (S) Suspended
- (I) Ineligible
- (W) Walk-on
- (5Y) Fifth-year senior
- Injured
- Current redshirt

Roster
Last update: March 9, 2025

== Schedule and results ==
Date time, TV	Rank^{#}	Opponent^{#}	Result	Record	High points	High rebounds	High assists	Site (attendance) city, state
Exhibition
October 30, 2024*; 6:30 pm		UNT Dallas	W 87–51	–	19 – Love	7 – Brittingham	5 – Tied	College Park Center (328); Arlington, TX
Non-conference regular season
November 4, 2024*; 5:00 pm, ESPN+		at Arizona	L 54–73	0–1	20 – Love	8 – Nelson	2 – Tied	McKale Center; Tucson, AZ
November 7, 2024*; 6:30 pm, ESPN+		Arlington Baptist	W 105–35	1–1	21 – Love	13 – Perkins	10 – Brittingham	College Park Center (1,161); Arlington, TX
November 10, 2024*; 6:00 pm, ESPN+		at Louisiana Tech; WAC/C-USA Challenge	L 60–71	1–2	14 – Love	9 – Love	3 – Tied	Thomas Assembly Center (1,543); Ruston, LA
November 14, 2024*; 6:30 pm, SECN+		at Arkansas	L 65–93	1–3	16 – Tied	10 – Love	5 – Love	Bud Walton Arena (2,221); Fayetteville, AR
November 18, 2024*; 6:30 pm, ESPN+		at East Texas A&M	W 73–71	2–3	24 – Love	17 – Brittingham	7 – Brittingham	The Field House (256); Commerce, TX
November 24, 2024*; 12:00 pm, B1G+		at Purdue	L 55–73	2–4	12 – Love	7 – Tied	3 – Brittingham	Mackey Arena (4,712); West Lafayette, IN
November 29, 2024*; 7:00 pm, ACCNX		at SMU	L 46–71	2–5	17 – Brittingham	13 – Brittingham	4 – Love	Moody Coliseum (927); University Park, TX
December 4, 2024*; 6:30 pm, ESPN+		Houston	W 61–57	3–5	16 – Brittingham	12 – Love	4 – Love	College Park Center (901); Arlington, TX
December 16, 2024*; 4:00 pm, ESPN+		FIU; WAC/C-USA Challenge	W 72–56	4–5	17 – Tied	7 – Tied	8 – Brittingham	College Park Center (734); Arlington, TX
December 19, 2024*; 4:00 pm, ESPN+		at UTSA	L 61–76	4–6	17 – Love	7 – Love	3 – Love	Convocation Center (775); San Antonio, TX
December 30, 2024*; 4:00 pm, ESPN+		Wiley	W 113–51	5–6	19 – Clark	15 – Brittingham	10 – Tied	College Park Center (795); Arlington, TX
WAC regular season
January 4, 2025; 2:00 pm, ESPN+		Tarleton State	W 87–79	6–6 (1–0)	29 – Love	13 – Brittingham	5 – Brittingham	College Park Center (1,041); Arlington, TX
January 9, 2025; 4:00 pm, ESPN+		Utah Tech	W 81–60	7–6 (2–0)	24 – Love	11 – Nelson	6 – Love	College Park Center; Arlington, TX
January 11, 2025; 2:00 pm, ESPN+		Southern Utah	W 78–54	8–6 (3–0)	18 – Love	6 – Brittingham	9 – Brittingham	College Park Center (867); Arlington, TX
January 16, 2025; 7:00 pm, ESPN+		at Utah Valley	L 75–86	8–7 (3–1)	17 – Clark	10 – Love	6 – Love	UCCU Center (483); Orem, UT
January 23, 2025; 8:00 pm, ESPN+		at Seattle	W 70–58	9–7 (4–1)	22 – Love	10 – Brittingham	4 – Brittingham	Redhawk Center (275); Seattle, WA
January 25, 2025; 2:00 pm, ESPN+		Abilene Christian	W 71–52	10–7 (5–1)	24 – Clark	10 – Brittingham	8 – Thornton	College Park Center (1,303); Arlington, TX
January 30, 2025; 7:30 pm, ESPN+		at Southern Utah	W 62–58	11–7 (6–1)	25 – Brittingham	11 – Brittingham	3 – Brittingham	America First Event Center; Cedar City, UT
February 1, 2025; 2:00 pm, ESPN+		at Utah Tech	W 86–67	12–7 (7–1)	18 – Threatt	17 – Brittingham	7 – Brittingham	Burns Arena (510); St. George, UT
February 6, 2025; 6:30 pm, ESPN+		Utah Valley	W 85–83	13–7 (8–1)	24 – Clark	7 – Love	6 – Love	College Park Center (1,124); Arlington, TX
February 8, 2025; 2:00 pm, ESPN+		Seattle	W 80–54	14–7 (9–1)	19 – Love	8 – Brittingham	5 – Goudeau	College Park Center (904); Arlington, TX
February 13, 2025; 8:00 pm, ESPN+		at California Baptist	L 79–90	14–8 (9–2)	19 – Clark	14 – Love	3 – Tied	Fowler Events Center (398); Riverside, CA
February 15, 2025; 3:00 pm, ESPN+		at Grand Canyon	L 69–82	14–9 (9–3)	29 – Thornton	6 – Brittingham	4 – Brittingham	Global Credit Union Arena (874); Phoenix, AZ
February 22, 2025; 2:00 pm, ESPN+		at Tarleton State	L 57–67	14–10 (9–4)	13 – Brittingham	11 – Brittingham	3 – Tied	Wisdom Gym (1,387); Stephenville, TX
February 27, 2025; 6:30 pm, ESPN+		Grand Canyon	L 59–72	14–11 (9–5)	11 – Tied	8 – Nelson	4 – Tied	College Park Center (1,247); Arlington, TX
March 1, 2025; 1:00 pm, ESPN+		at Abilene Christian	L 74–81	14–12 (9–6)	16 – Clark	6 – Love	4 – Love	Moody Coliseum (692); Abilene, TX
March 8, 2025; 2:00 pm, ESPN+		California Baptist	W 87–73	15–12 (10–6)	26 – Love	10 – Tied	8 – Brittingham	College Park Center (1,177); Arlington, TX
WAC tournament
March 13, 2025; 4:30 pm, ESPN+	(3)	vs. (6) California Baptist; Quarterfinals	W 72–66	16–12	20 – Brittingham	7 – Tied	4 – Tied	Orleans Arena (688); Paradise, NV
March 14, 2025; 2:30 pm, ESPN+	(3)	vs. (2) Tarleton State; Semifinals	W 66–55	17–12	15 – Tied	6 – Love	4 – Love	Orleans Arena (1,186); Paradise, NV
March 15, 2025; 12:30 pm, ESPNU	(3)	vs. (1) Grand Canyon; Championship	L 62–65	17–13	21 – Love	8 – Brittingham	5 – Thornton	Orleans Arena (2,347); Paradise, NV
WNIT
March 20, 2025; 6:30 pm, ESPN+		Incarnate Word; First Round	W 78–52	18–13	22 – Clark	9 – Brittingham	4 – Tied	College Park Center (1,167); Arlington, TX
March 24, 2025; 6:00 pm, ESPN+		at North Texas; Second Round	L 67–78	18–14	20 – Love	9 – Love	5 – Tied	The Super Pit; Denton, TX
*Non-conference game. ^{#}Rankings from AP poll. (#) Tournament seedings in parentheses. All times are in Central.
