= 2024–25 Utah Tech Trailblazers women's basketball team =

American college basketball season

2024–25 Utah Tech Trailblazers women's basketball
- Conference: Western Athletic Conference
- Record: 6–25 (1–15 WAC)
- Head coach: JD Gustin (9th season)
- Associate head coach: Nicole Yazzie
- Assistant coaches: Candace Thornton; Taylia Stimpson
- Home arena: Burns Arena

2024–25 WAC women's basketball standings
| | Conf. | | | | Overall |
| Team | W | | L | PCT | W | | L | PCT |
|---|---|---|---|---|---|---|---|---|
| Grand Canyon † | 16 | – | 0 | 1.000 | 32 | – | 3 | .914 |
| Tarleton | 10 | – | 6 | .625 | 20 | – | 14 | .588 |
| UT Arlington | 10 | – | 6 | .625 | 18 | – | 14 | .563 |
| Abilene Christian | 9 | – | 7 | .563 | 22 | – | 13 | .629 |
| Utah Valley | 9 | – | 7 | .563 | 19 | – | 13 | .594 |
| California Baptist | 9 | – | 7 | .563 | 12 | – | 19 | .387 |
| Southern Utah | 7 | – | 9 | .438 | 9 | – | 21 | .300 |
| Utah Tech | 1 | – | 15 | .063 | 6 | – | 25 | .194 |
| Seattle | 1 | – | 15 | .063 | 4 | – | 26 | .133 |
† 2025 WAC tournament winner

The 2024–25 Utah Tech Trailblazers women's basketball team represented Utah Tech University during the 2024–25 NCAA Division I women's basketball season. The Trailblazers, who were led by ninth-year head coach JD Gustin, played their home games at Burns Arena in St. George, Utah as members of the Western Athletic Conference (WAC).

The Trailblazers finished the season 6–25, 1–15 in WAC play, to finish tied for eighth (last) place. They defeated No. 9 seed Seattle in the first round of the WAC tournament before losing to No.1 seed Grand Canyon in the quarterfinals.

== Previous season ==
The Trailblazers finished the 2023–24 season 18–14, 12–8 in WAC play, to finish in fourth place. They were defeated by UT Arlington in the quarterfinals of the WAC tournament.

== Preseason ==
On October 16, 2024, the WAC released their preseason coaches poll. Utah Tech was picked to finish seventh in the WAC regular season.

=== Preseason rankings ===
WAC preseason poll
| Predicted finish | Team | Votes (1st place) |
|---|---|---|
| 1 | Grand Canyon | 59 (4) |
| 2 | California Baptist | 58 (4) |
| 3 | UT Arlington | 53 (1) |
| 4 | Abilene Christian | 37 |
| 5 | Southern Utah | 33 |
| 6 | Tarleton State | 28 |
| 7 | Utah Tech | 24 |
| 8 | Utah Valley | 17 |
| 9 | Seattle | 15 |

=== Preseason All-WAC Team ===
No Trailblazers were named to the Preseason All-WAC team.

== Roster ==
2024–25 Utah Tech Trailblazers women's basketball team
Players
Coaches

| Pos. | # | Name | Height | Year | Previous school | Hometown |
|---|---|---|---|---|---|---|
| G | 0 | Kastyn Young | 5 ft 11 in (1.8 m) | RS Fr | Harlan High School | Mico, TX |
| G | 1 | Maddie Warren | 5 ft 10 in (1.78 m) | RS Jr | Lehi High School | Lehi, UT |
| G | 2 | Macie Warren | 5 ft 10 in (1.78 m) | RS Jr | Lehi High School | Lehi, UT |
| G | 3 | Calyn Dallas | 6 ft 1 in (1.85 m) | So | Cooper High School | Lubbock, TX |
| G | 4 | Brie Crittendon | 5 ft 10 in (1.78 m) | RS Jr | Eastern Kentucky | Union, KY |
| G | 5 | Chardonnay Hartley | 5 ft 3 in (1.6 m) | Jr | Niagara | Harlem, NY |
| G | 6 | Ellie Clawson | 6 ft 0 in (1.83 m) | Fr | Raymond High School | Stirling, AB |
| G | 10 | Andjela Colic | 5 ft 7 in (1.7 m) | Fr | Karaburma Beograd | Belgrade, Serbia |
| F | 11 | Paige Cofer | 6 ft 0 in (1.83 m) | Fr | Eagle High School | Eagle, ID |
| G | 12 | Ellie Taylor | 5 ft 10 in (1.78 m) | Fr | Copper Hills High School | West Jordan, UT |
| G/F | 13 | Mylee Graham | 6 ft 0 in (1.83 m) | Fr | Rigby High School | Rigby, ID |
| G | 14 | Halli Burbidge | 5 ft 10 in (1.78 m) | Fr | Herriman High School | South Jordan, UT |
| G | 15 | Makeili Ika | 5 ft 4 in (1.63 m) | So | College of Southern Idaho | Provo, UT |
| G | 21 | Aaliyah Ibarra | 5 ft 8 in (1.73 m) | Jr | College of Southern Nevada | Las Vegas, NV |
| F | 22 | Emily Isaacson | 5 ft 11 in (1.8 m) | RS Sr | Box Elder High School | Perry, UT |
| G | 23 | Mattie Olson | 5 ft 8 in (1.73 m) | RS So | Montana State | Idaho Falls, ID |
| F | 24 | Lauren Crocker | 6 ft 4 in (1.93 m) | So | Utah State | Calgary, AB |
| F | 25 | Nicole Willardson | 6 ft 4 in (1.93 m) | So | Richfield High School | Richfield, UT |

Head coach

- JD Gustin (Montana Western)

Assistant coach(es)

- Nicole Yazzie (Westminster)
- Candace Thornton (UCCS)
- Taylia Stimpson (Utah Tech)

Legend

- (C) Team captain
- (S) Suspended
- (I) Ineligible
- (W) Walk-on
- Injured
- Current redshirt

Roster
Last update: March 14, 2025

== Schedule and results ==
| Date time, TV | Rank^{#} | Opponent^{#} | Result | Record | High points | High rebounds | High assists | Site (attendance) city, state |
Non-conference regular season
| November 4, 2024*; 11:00 a.m., ESPN+ | | Northern New Mexico | W 87–66 | 1–0 | 21 – Hartley | 9 – Willardson | 10 – Hartley | Burns Arena (1,841); St. George, UT |
| November 7, 2024*; 6:00 p.m., ESPN+ | | at New Mexico State; WAC/C-USA Challenge | L 63–85 | 1–1 | 23 – Hartley | 9 – Graham | 5 – Hartley | Pan American Center (762); Las Cruces, NM |
| November 13, 2024*; 2:00 p.m., ESPN+ | | Stonehill | L 86–89 | 1–2 | 23 – Ibarra | 7 – Taylor | 7 – Hartley | Burns Arena (327); St. George, UT |
| November 16, 2024*; 7:00 p.m., ESPN+ | | Weber State | W 81–78 | 2–2 | 28 – Hartley | 6 – Isaacson | 12 – Hartley | Burns Arena (665); St. George, UT |
| November 21, 2024*; 5:00 p.m., ESPN+ | | at Houston Christian | L 51–57 | 2–3 | 17 – Hartley | 9 – Crittendon | 7 – Hartley | Sharp Gymnasium (409); Houston, TX |
| November 23, 2024*; 12:00 p.m., ESPN+ | | at McNeese | W 79–69 | 3–3 | 36 – Ibarra | 8 – Isaacson | 8 – Hartley | The Legacy Center (2,430); Lake Charles, LA |
| November 27, 2024*; 1:00 p.m., ESPN+ | | Colorado | L 73–85 | 3–4 | 15 – Ibarra | 6 – Tied | 10 – Hartley | Burns Arena (467); St. George, UT |
| November 30, 2024*; 2:00 p.m., ESPN+ | | Westcliff | W 63–40 | 4–4 | 17 – Ibarra | 7 – Tied | 3 – Taylor | Burns Arena (260); St. George, UT |
| December 4, 2024*; 6:00 p.m., ESPN+ | | at Rice | L 71–82 | 4–5 | 14 – Ibarra | 8 – Willardson | 3 – Isaacson | Tudor Fieldhouse (566); Houston, TX |
| December 6, 2024*; 1:00 p.m., MWN | | at Boise State | L 56–90 | 4–6 | 14 – Ibarra | 7 – Willardson | 6 – Hartley | ExtraMile Arena (1,189); Boise, ID |
| December 14, 2024*; 1:00 p.m., ESPN+ | | UTEP; WAC/C-USA Challenge | L 57–71 | 4–7 | 15 – Crittendon | 6 – Willardson | 5 – Hartley | Burns Arena (377); St. George, UT |
| December 18, 2024*; 10:00 a.m., ESPN+ | | at Baylor | L 34–97 | 4–8 | 9 – Hartley | 6 – Willardson | 3 – Hartley | Foster Pavilion (6,149); Waco, TX |
| December 21, 2024*; 1:00 p.m., ESPN+ | | Pittsburgh | L 52–61 | 4–9 | 16 – Crittendon | 5 – Crittendon | 5 – Hartley | Burns Arena (358); St. George, UT |
WAC regular season
| January 9, 2025; 3:00 p.m., ESPN+ | | at UT Arlington | L 60–81 | 4–10 (0–1) | 17 – Hartley | 9 – Tied | 7 – Hartley | College Park Center; Arlington, TX |
| January 11, 2025; 1:00 p.m., ESPN+ | | at Tarleton State | L 65–74 | 4–11 (0–2) | 22 – Taylor | 6 – Crittendon | 7 – Hartley | Wisdom Gym (276); Stephenville, TX |
| January 16, 2025; 7:00 p.m., ESPN+ | | Seattle | W 80–70 | 5–11 (1–2) | 18 – Taylor | 11 – Crittendon | 13 – Hartley | Burns Arena (543); St. George, UT |
| January 18, 2025; 2:00 p.m., ESPN+ | | Utah Valley; Old Hammer Rivalry | L 46–62 | 5–12 (1–3) | 19 – Isaacson | 6 – Tied | 4 – Hartley | Burns Arena (699); St. George, UT |
| January 25, 2025; 2:00 p.m., ESPN+ | | at Grand Canyon | L 43–78 | 5–13 (1–4) | 19 – Taylor | 6 – Isaacson | 5 – Hartley | Global Credit Union Arena (1,584); Phoenix, AZ |
| January 30, 2025; 7:00 p.m., ESPN+ | | Tarleton State | L 61–70 | 5–14 (1–5) | 16 – Taylor | 6 – Crittendon | 5 – Hartley | Burns Arena (618); St. George, UT |
| February 1, 2025; 1:00 p.m., ESPN+ | | UT Arlington | L 67–86 | 5–15 (1–6) | 16 – Cofer | 10 – Isaacson | 9 – Hartley | Burns Arena (510); St. George, UT |
| February 6, 2025; 5:00 p.m., ESPN+ | | at Abilene Christian | L 66–84 | 5–16 (1–7) | 19 – Isaacson | 5 – Isaacson | 10 – Hartley | Moody Coliseum (723); Abilene, TX |
| February 13, 2025; 7:00 p.m., ESPN+ | | Southern Utah | L 66–69 | 5–17 (1–8) | 21 – Taylor | 7 – Graham | 5 – Hartley | Burns Arena (990); St. George, UT |
| February 15, 2025; 2:00 p.m., ESPN+ | | California Baptist | L 75–81 | 5–18 (1–9) | 27 – Isaacson | 8 – Cofer | 4 – Tied | Burns Arena (437); St. George, UT |
| February 19, 2025; 6:00 p.m., ESPN+ | | at Utah Valley; Old Hammer Rivalry | L 51–74 | 5–19 (1–10) | 13 – Cofer | 7 – Willardson | 4 – Hartley | UCCU Center (740); Orem, UT |
| February 22, 2025; 2:00 p.m., ESPN+ | | Abilene Christian | L 60–71 | 5–20 (1–11) | 22 – Isaacson | 8 – Cofer | 8 – Hartley | Burns Arena (386); St. George, UT |
| February 27, 2025; 6:30 p.m., ESPN+ | | at Southern Utah | L 51–78 | 5–21 (1–12) | 13 – Hartley | 8 – Isaacson | 3 – Ibarra | America First Event Center (536); Cedar City, UT |
| March 1, 2025; 2:00 p.m., ESPN+ | | at California Baptist | L 74–94 | 5–22 (1–13) | 25 – Cofer | 11 – Cofer | 5 – Hartley | Fowler Events Center (589); Riverside, CA |
| March 6, 2025; 7:00 p.m., ESPN+ | | Grand Canyon | L 42–74 | 5–23 (1–14) | 11 – Isaacson | 7 – Crittendon | 3 – Tied | Burns Arena (700); St. George, UT |
| March 8, 2025; 2:00 p.m., ESPN+ | | at Seattle | L 65–69 | 5–24 (1–15) | 15 – Hartley | 8 – Isaacson | 8 – Hartley | Redhawk Center (706); Seattle, WA |
WAC tournament
| March 11, 2025; 12:00 p.m., ESPN+ | (8) | (9) Seattle; First round | W 74–60 | 6–24 | 21 – Ibarra | 9 – Willardson | 7 – Hartley | Burns Arena (233); St. George, UT |
| March 12, 2025; 1:00 p.m., ESPN+ | (8) | vs. (1) Grand Canyon; Quarterfinals | L 47–71 | 6–25 | 11 – Taylor | 6 – Cofer | 11 – Hartley | Orleans Arena; Paradise, NV |
*Non-conference game. ^{#}Rankings from AP poll. (#) Tournament seedings in parentheses. All times are in Mountain.
