= 2024–25 Southern Utah Thunderbirds women's basketball team =

American college basketball season

2024–25 Southern Utah Thunderbirds women's basketball
- Conference: Western Athletic Conference
- Record: 9–21 (7–9 WAC)
- Head coach: Tracy Mason (7th season)
- Associate head coach: Allyson Fasnacht
- Assistant coaches: Jay Johnson; Hailey Ferry
- Home arena: America First Event Center

2024–25 WAC women's basketball standings
	Conf.				Overall
Team	W		L	PCT	W		L	PCT
Grand Canyon †	16	–	0	1.000	32	–	3	.914
Tarleton	10	–	6	.625	20	–	14	.588
UT Arlington	10	–	6	.625	18	–	14	.563
Abilene Christian	9	–	7	.563	22	–	13	.629
Utah Valley	9	–	7	.563	19	–	13	.594
California Baptist	9	–	7	.563	12	–	19	.387
Southern Utah	7	–	9	.438	9	–	21	.300
Utah Tech	1	–	15	.063	6	–	25	.194
Seattle	1	–	15	.063	4	–	26	.133
† 2025 WAC tournament winner

The 2024–25 Southern Utah Thunderbirds women's basketball team represented Southern Utah University during the 2024–25 NCAA Division I women's basketball season. The Thunderbirds, who were led by seventh-year head coach Tracy Mason, played their home games at America First Event Center in Cedar City, Utah as members of the Western Athletic Conference.

== Previous season ==
The Thunderbirds finished the 2023–24 season 8–22, 6–14 in WAC play, to finish in a tie for eighth place. They were defeated by UT Arlington in the first round of the WAC tournament.

== Preseason ==
On October 16, 2024, the WAC released their preseason coaches poll. Southern Utah was picked to finish fifth in the WAC regular season.

=== Preseason rankings ===
WAC preseason poll
Predicted finish	Team	Votes (1st place)
1	Grand Canyon	59 (4)
2	California Baptist	58 (4)
3	UT Arlington	53 (1)
4	Abilene Christian	37
5	Southern Utah	33
6	Tarleton State	28
7	Utah Tech	24
8	Utah Valley	17
9	Seattle	15

=== Preseason All-WAC Team ===
Preseason All-WAC Team
Player	Position	Year
Daylani Ballena	Guard	Graduate student

== Roster ==
2024–25 Southern Utah Thunderbirds women's basketball team
Players
Coaches

Pos.	#	Name	Height	Year	Previous school	Hometown
G	1	Kortney Doman	5 ft 10 in (1.78 m)	Fr	Crane Union High School	Crane, Oregon
G	2	Bella Hasan	5 ft 6 in (1.68 m)	Fr	Kamiak High School	Mukilteo, Washington
G	3	Sierra Chambers	5 ft 8 in (1.73 m)	Fr	San Ramon Valley High School	Danville, California
G	4	Aishah Anis	5 ft 7 in (1.7 m)	Sr	Launceston Church Grammar School	Launceston, Australia
G	5	Charli Kay	5 ft 9 in (1.75 m)	So	Marist Regional College	Smithton, Australia
G	10	Maria Garcia	5 ft 8 in (1.73 m)	So	FC Barcelona Bàsquet	Barcelona, Spain
C	13	Ashley Banks	6 ft 5 in (1.96 m)	Jr	Boise High School	Boise, Idaho
G	14	Sydney Gandy	5 ft 5 in (1.65 m)	GS	Loyola Marymount	Long Beach, California
G	22	Daylani Ballena	5 ft 8 in (1.73 m)	GS	Kentridge High School	Kent, Washington
F	23	Lexi Bull	6 ft 0 in (1.83 m)	GS	Tarleton State	Pocatello, Idaho
F	24	Jaeden Brown	6 ft 1 in (1.85 m)	Sr	Utah Valley	Draper, Utah
F	30	Zoey Davis	6 ft 2 in (1.88 m)	Fr	Bay High School	Panama City, Florida
F	32	Denver Anderson	6 ft 1 in (1.85 m)	Fr	Mount Zion High School	Mount Zion, Illinois
G	34	Samantha Johnston	6 ft 0 in (1.83 m)	GS	Cedar High School	Cedar City, Utah
F	35	Olivia Malafu	6 ft 0 in (1.83 m)	Fr	Kapaa High School	Kapaʻa, Hawaii
F	44	Ava Uhrich	6 ft 0 in (1.83 m)	So	Pinewood School	Burlingame, California

Head coach

- Tracy Mason (Saint Mary's)

Assistant coach(es)

- Allyson Fasnacht (Liberty)
- Jay Johnson (Saint Mary's)
- Hailey Ferry (Southern Utah)

Legend

- (C) Team captain
- (S) Suspended
- (I) Ineligible
- (W) Walk-on
- Injured
- Current redshirt

Roster
Last update: March 13, 2025

== Schedule and results ==
Date time, TV	Rank^{#}	Opponent^{#}	Result	Record	High points	High rebounds	High assists	Site (attendance) city, state
Exhibition
October 30, 2024*; 6:30 pm		Ottawa (AZ)	W 66–47	–	13 – Gandy	7 – Ballena	6 – Uhrich	America First Event Center (556); Cedar City, UT
Non-conference regular season
November 4, 2024*; 11:00 am, ESPN+		at Utah	L 52–105	0–1	15 – Chambers	5 – Uhrich	4 – Johnston	Jon M. Huntsman Center; Salt Lake City, UT
November 9, 2024*; 1:30 pm, ESPN+		at Jacksonville State; WAC/C-USA Challenge	L 58–77	0–2	16 – Ballena	8 – Uhrich	6 – Ballena	Pete Mathews Coliseum (519); Jacksonville, AL
November 13, 2024*; 7:00 pm		at Fresno State	L 59–67	0–3	13 – Gandy	7 – Brown	5 – Tied	Save Mart Center (887); Fresno, CA
November 16, 2024*; 2:00 pm, ESPN+		Idaho	L 53–66	0–4	12 – Gandy	8 – Bull	2 – Tied	America First Event Center (355); Cedar City, UT
November 20, 2024*; 6:30 pm, ESPN+		Saint Joseph's	L 53–82	0–5	12 – Ballena	3 – Tied	4 – Gandy	America First Event Center (369); Cedar City, UT
November 22, 2024*; 6:30 pm, ESPN+		Bethesda	W 86–45	1–5	15 – Gandy	6 – Tied	6 – Tied	America First Event Center (349); Cedar City, UT
November 29, 2024*; 4:00 pm		vs. Portland; Nugget Classic	L 63–77	1–6	22 – Uhrich	8 – Uhrich	4 – Tied	Lawlor Events Center (1,303); Reno, NV
November 30, 2024*; 2:00 pm, MWN		at Nevada; Nugget Classic	L 54–72	1–7	21 – Gandy	6 – Brown	2 – Anderson	Lawlor Events Center; Reno, NV
December 1, 2024*; 12:00 pm		vs. Central Michigan; Nugget Classic	L 61–70	1–8	16 – Gandy	13 – Brown	5 – Gandy	Lawlor Events Center; Reno, NV
December 7, 2024*; 1:00 pm, ESPN+		at Colorado	L 59–76	1–9	11 – Tied	5 – Brown	3 – Tied	CU Events Center (2,280); Boulder, CO
December 16, 2024*; 6:30 pm, ESPN+		Sam Houston; WAC/C-USA Challenge	L 61–72	1–10	11 – Ballena	11 – Brown	2 – Tied	America First Event Center (266); Cedar City, UT
December 20, 2024*; 2:00 pm, ESPN+		Park–Gilbert	W 92–42	2–10	28 – Uhrich	12 – Bull	7 – Gandy	America First Event Center (201); Cedar City, UT
December 28, 2024*; 2:00 pm, ESPN+		Cal Poly	L 58–66	2–11	17 – Uhrich	5 – Brown	7 – Gandy	America First Event Center (309); Cedar City, UT
WAC regular season
January 4, 2025; 2:00 pm, ESPN+		Grand Canyon	L 57–75	2–12 (0–1)	12 – Bull	9 – Bull	4 – Ballena	America First Event Center (346); Cedar City, UT
January 9, 2025; 4:00 pm, ESPN+		Tarleton State	L 53–64	2–13 (0–2)	13 – Ballena	5 – Tied	6 – Ballena	America First Event Center (282); Cedar City, UT
January 11, 2025; 1:00 pm, ESPN+		at UT Arlington	L 54–78	2–14 (0–3)	11 – Ballena	9 – Bull	4 – Gandy	College Park Center (867); Arlington, TX
January 18, 2025; 2:00 pm, ESPN+		Seattle	W 61–57	3–14 (1–3)	15 – Uhrich	9 – Bull	6 – Tied	America First Event Center (414); Cedar City, UT
January 23, 2025; 6:00 pm, ESPN+		at Grand Canyon	L 51–79	3–15 (1–4)	13 – Ballena	6 – Bull	4 – Gandy	Global Credit Union Arena (698); Phoenix, AZ
January 25, 2025; 2:00 pm, ESPN+		at California Baptist	W 64–63	4–15 (2–4)	20 – Ballena	16 – Bull	5 – Tied	Fowler Events Center (426); Riverside, CA
January 30, 2025; 6:30 pm, ESPN+		UT Arlington	L 58–62	4–16 (2–5)	16 – Johnston	12 – Bull	4 – Tied	America First Event Center; Cedar City, UT
February 1, 2025; 2:00 pm, ESPN+		Tarleton State	L 53–74	4–17 (2–6)	15 – Uhrich	4 – Banks	3 – Tied	America First Event Center (376); Cedar City, UT
February 6, 2025; 6:30 pm, ESPN+		California Baptist	L 66–69	4–18 (2–7)	18 – Johnston	9 – Bull	4 – Bull	America First Event Center (455); Cedar City, UT
February 8, 2025; 12:00 pm, ESPN+		at Abilene Christian	L 52–74	4–19 (2–8)	24 – Uhrich	5 – Ballena	4 – Johnston	Moody Coliseum (960); Abilene, TX
February 13, 2025; 7:00 pm, ESPN+		at Utah Tech	W 69–66	5–19 (3–8)	18 – Ballena	8 – Tied	4 – Johnston	Burns Arena (990); St. George, UT
February 15, 2025; 2:00 pm, ESPN+		at Utah Valley	W 72–63	6–19 (4–8)	27 – Uhrich	10 – Bull	4 – Tied	Lockhart Arena (682); Orem, UT
February 19, 2025; 6:30 pm, ESPN+		Abilene Christian	W 49–46	7–19 (5–8)	19 – Ballena	14 – Bull	3 – Ballena	America First Event Center (480); Cedar City, UT
February 27, 2025; 6:30 pm, ESPN+		Utah Tech	W 78–51	8–19 (6–8)	16 – Chambers	8 – Uhrich	7 – Ballena	America First Event Center (536); Cedar City, UT
March 1, 2025; 6:30 pm, ESPN+		Utah Valley	L 48–53	8–20 (6–9)	13 – Gandy	10 – Brown	3 – Gandy	America First Event Center (570); Cedar City, UT
March 6, 2025; 7:00 pm, ESPN+		at Seattle	W 66–51	9–20 (7–9)	19 – Ballena	7 – Uhrich	5 – Gandy	Redhawk Center (212); Seattle, WA
WAC tournament
March 12, 2025; 3:30 pm, ESPN+	(7)	vs. (2) Tarleton State; Quarterfinals	L 40–59	9–21	9 – Tied	6 – Tied	3 – Johnston	Orleans Arena (995); Paradise, NV
*Non-conference game. ^{#}Rankings from AP poll. (#) Tournament seedings in parentheses. All times are in Mountain.
