= Molly Miller =

American women's college basketball coach

Current position
- Title: Head coach
- Team: Arizona State
- Conference: Big 12
- Record: 24–11 (.686)

Biographical details
- Born: October 19, 1985 (age 41); Springfield, Missouri, U.S.

Playing career
- 2004–2008: Drury

Coaching career (HC unless noted)
- 2012–2014: Drury (assistant)
- 2014–2020: Drury
- 2020–2025: Grand Canyon
- 2025–present: Arizona State

Head coaching record
- Overall: 321–66 (.829)
- Tournaments: 0–2 (NCAA D1); 10–5 (NCAA D2); 0–1 (WNIT)

Accomplishments and honors

Championships
- NCAA Division II Final Four (2019); WAC regular season (2025); WAC tournament (2025); 5× GLVC regular season (2015, 2017–2020); 5× GLVC tournament (2015, 2017–2020)

Awards
- 2× WBCA Division II Coach of the Year (2019, 2020); WAC Coach of the Year (2025)

Molly Miller (née Carter; born October 19, 1985) is an American college basketball coach. She is the head coach for the women's team at Arizona State University, beginning with the 2025–26 season. She was the head coach at Grand Canyon University from 2020 to 2025. Miller was also the head coach at her alma mater, Drury University, a Division II university in Springfield, Missouri, where she also played college basketball.

== Playing career ==
Miller attended Kickapoo High School in Springfield, Missouri, where she played basketball for four years, winning two state championships.

She later played college basketball for Drury University for four years and ranks second on the school's all-time record book for scoring (1,570 points), assists (439), and steals (407). In 2012, she was inducted into the school's Hall of Fame.

=== Drury statistics ===
Legend
| GP | Games played | GS | Games started | MPG | Minutes per game |
| FG% | Field goal percentage | 3P% | 3-point field goal percentage | FT% | Free throw percentage |
| RPG | Rebounds per game | APG | Assists per game | SPG | Steals per game |
| BPG | Blocks per game | PPG | Points per game | **Bold** | Career high |

| Year | Team | GP | Points | FG% | 3P% | FT% | RPG | APG | SPG | BPG | PPG |
|---|---|---|---|---|---|---|---|---|---|---|---|
| 2004–05 | Drury | 31 | 218 | 39.4% | 25.7% | 63.1% | 2.2 | 3.4 | 3.2 | 0.0 | 7.0 |
| 2005–06 | Drury | **33** | 355 | **47.7%** | **37.7%** | 74.8% | 1.8 | 2.7 | 2.9 | 0.1 | 10.8 |
| 2006–07 | Drury | **33** | **515** | 42.4% | 33.3% | 76.6% | 3.4 | 3.5 | 2.9 | 0.1 | **15.6** |
| 2007–08 | Drury | 32 | 473 | 40.2% | 35.9% | **78.5%** | **4.2** | **4.0** | **3.6** | **0.2** | 14.8 |
| Career | | 129 | 1561 | 42.4% | 34.4% | 74.7% | 2.9 | 3.4 | 3.1 | 0.1 | 12.1 |

== Coaching career ==
=== Drury University ===
Miller began coaching at her alma mater, Drury, in 2012. She was an assistant for two seasons before taking over as head coach in 2014 following the resignation of Steve Harold. Drury finished 32–0 in Miller's final year at the university and was the top seed in the NCAA Division II tournament. The tournament was cancelled due to the COVID-19 pandemic. During her stay with Drury, she was a two-time WBCA Division II National Coach of the Year.

=== Grand Canyon University ===
In April 2020, Miller was hired as the head coach of the Grand Canyon Antelopes women's basketball team, replacing Nicole Powell who left to take the over as head coach at UC Riverside. At Grand Canyon, Miller led the Lopes to two Western Athletic Conference finals games in her first two seasons.

In 2024-25, she led GCU to their greatest season in school history. Using a 30-game winning streak, the Lopes won the WAC regular season championship with a 16–0 conference record, the and 2025 WAC Tournament championship, and a #13 seed in the 2025 NCAA Division I women's basketball tournament. It marked the school's first WAC Tournament title, the longest win streak in conference history and the first NCAA Tournament appearance in school history.

=== Arizona State University ===
In March 2025, Miller was hired as the head of the Arizona State Sun Devils, replacing Natasha Adair.

Under Miller, the Sun Devils started the 2025–26 season on an extended winning streak. On December 6, they defeated San Francisco to improve their record to 10–0 and set the program record for consecutive wins to start a season. The previous record was 9–0 by the 1992–93 team. With wins in their first two Big 12 conference games, the Sun Devils moved to 15–0, tying the 2008–09 and 2015–16 teams for the longest win streak in school history. The 15-game win streak ended January 3, 2026 with a 71–62 loss at BYU.

On Feb. 14, 2026, Miller earned her 21st win of the season, becoming the winningest first-year coach in Arizona State women's basketball history, finishing off a season-sweep of the Arizona Wildcats with an overtime win in Tucson, Arizona. Miller is just the third ASU head coach with 21 wins and the 2025-26 team is just the 15th in Sun Devil history with 21 or more wins - 13 of the previous 14 reached the NCAA Tournament. Coach Miller set the school record for most wins (24) by a first-year coach, helping Arizona State advance to the NCAA First Four. It marked ASU's first NCAA Tournament appearance since 2019.

== Awards ==
On June 24, 2025, the Springfield, Missouri, News-Leader ranked Miller number 4 among its top 25 coaches in the first 25 years of the 21st century in southwest Missouri.

== Personal life ==
Miller married Derek Miller in September 2012. Derek is a Missouri State University graduate where he played college football and works as a CRNA. The couple has two children, daughter Crosby and son Cy.

== Head coaching record ==
Record table
| Season | Team | Overall | Conference | Standing | Postseason |
|---|---|---|---|---|---|
Drury Panthers (Great Lakes Valley Conference) (2014–2020)
| 2014–15 | Drury | 26–4 | 17–1 | 1st (West) | NCAA Division II First Round |
| 2015–16 | Drury | 26–5 | 16–2 | 1st (West) | NCAA Division II Sweet Sixteen |
| 2016–17 | Drury | 30–4 | 17–1 | 1st (West) | NCAA Division II Sweet Sixteen |
| 2017–18 | Drury | 31–3 | 17–1 | 1st (West) | NCAA Division II Sweet Sixteen |
| 2018–19 | Drury | 35–1 | 18–0 | 1st | NCAA Division II Final Four |
| 2019–20 | Drury | 32–0 | 20–0 | 1st | Postseason not held due to COVID-19 |
| Drury: | | 180–17 (.914) | 105–5 (.955) | | |
Grand Canyon Antelopes (Western Athletic Conference) (2020–2025)
| 2020–21 | Grand Canyon | 18–7 | 8–4 | 3rd | |
| 2021–22 | Grand Canyon | 22–10 | 14–4 | 2nd | WNIT First Round |
| 2022–23 | Grand Canyon | 21–10 | 12–6 | 4th | |
| 2023–24 | Grand Canyon | 24–8 | 16–4 | 2nd | |
| 2024–25 | Grand Canyon | 32–3 | 16–0 | 1st | NCAA Division I First Round |
| Grand Canyon: | | 117–38 (.755) | 66–18 (.786) | | |
Arizona State Sun Devils (Big 12 Conference) (2025–present)
| 2025–26 | Arizona State | 24–11 | 9–9 | T–9th | NCAA Division I First Four |
| Arizona State: | | 24–11 (.686) | 9–9 (.500) | | |
| Total: | | 321–66 (.829) | | | |
National champion Postseason invitational champion Conference regular season champion Conference regular season and conference tournament champion Division regular season champion Division regular season and conference tournament champion Conference tournament champion
