= 2024–25 California Baptist Lancers women's basketball team =

American college basketball season

2024–25 California Baptist Lancers women's basketball
- Conference: Western Athletic Conference
- Record: 12–19 (9–7 WAC)
- Head coach: Jarrod Olson (13th season)
- Associate head coach: Brittany Chambers
- Assistant coaches: Kamille Diaz; Kelsey Keizer; Maiya Michel
- Home arena: Fowler Events Center

2024–25 WAC women's basketball standings
	Conf.				Overall
Team	W		L	PCT	W		L	PCT
Grand Canyon †	16	–	0	1.000	32	–	3	.914
Tarleton	10	–	6	.625	20	–	14	.588
UT Arlington	10	–	6	.625	18	–	14	.563
Abilene Christian	9	–	7	.563	22	–	13	.629
Utah Valley	9	–	7	.563	19	–	13	.594
California Baptist	9	–	7	.563	12	–	19	.387
Southern Utah	7	–	9	.438	9	–	21	.300
Utah Tech	1	–	15	.063	6	–	25	.194
Seattle	1	–	15	.063	4	–	26	.133
† 2025 WAC tournament winner

The 2024–25 California Baptist Lancers women's basketball team represented California Baptist University during the 2024–25 NCAA Division I women's basketball season. The Lancers, led by 13th-year head coach Jarrod Olson, played their home games at the Fowler Events Center in Riverside, California as members of the Western Athletic Conference (WAC). They finished the season 12–19, 9–7 in WAC play, to finish in a three-way tie for fourth place.

== Previous season ==
The Lancers finished the 2023–24 season 28–4, 18–2 in WAC play, to finish as WAC regular-season champions. They defeated UT Arlington and Stephen F. Austin to win the WAC tournament championship, sending the Lancers to their first-ever NCAA tournament. In the NCAA tournament, they received the #15 seed in the Albany Regional 2, where they fell to #2 region seed UCLA in the first round.

== Preseason ==
On October 16, 2024 the WAC released their preseason coaches poll. California Baptist was picked to finish second in the WAC regular season.

=== Preseason rankings ===
WAC preseason poll
Predicted finish	Team	Votes (1st place)
1	Grand Canyon	59 (4)
2	California Baptist	58 (4)
3	UT Arlington	53 (1)
4	Abilene Christian	37
5	Southern Utah	33
6	Tarleton State	28
7	Utah Tech	24
8	Utah Valley	17
9	Seattle	15

=== Preseason All-WAC team ===
No Lancers were named to the Preseason All-WAC team.

== Roster ==
2024–25 California Baptist Lancers women's basketball team
Players
Coaches

Pos.	#	Name	Height	Year	Previous school	Hometown
G	3	Shawnee Nordstrom	5 ft 6 in (1.68 m)	Fr	Lone Peak High School	Hamilton, New Zealand
G	5	Filipa Barros	5 ft 9 in (1.75 m)	Jr	Portuguese U20 National Team	Maia, Portugal
G	8	Nhug Bosch Duran	5 ft 7 in (1.7 m)	Sr	Wichita State	Barcelona, Spain
G	10	Claudia Fiel	5 ft 9 in (1.75 m)	So	Celta Baloncesto de Vigo	Pontevedra, Spain
G	13	Nia Anderson	5 ft 6 in (1.68 m)	RS Fr	Saint Mary's Stockton High School	Dublin, CA
F	14	Emma Johansson	6 ft 3 in (1.91 m)	Jr	South Florida	Jönköping, Sweden
G	21	Anaiyah Tu'ua	5 ft 9 in (1.75 m)	Sr	Cal State Northridge	Anaheim, CA
G	22	Sydney White	5 ft 9 in (1.75 m)	So	Arapahoe High School	Centennial, CO
G	24	Khloe Lemon	5 ft 9 in (1.75 m)	So	Millard South High School	Omaha, NE
G	27	CeCe Legaspi	5 ft 10 in (1.78 m)	Fr	Rocky Mountain High School	Meridian, ID
F	32	Hailey Long	5 ft 10 in (1.78 m)	Jr	Eastern Wyoming College	Gallup, NM
F	33	Grace Schmidt	6 ft 0 in (1.83 m)	Jr	Watertown Luther Prep	Ixonia, WI

Head coach

- Jarrod Olson (Doane)

Assistant coach(es)

- Brittany Chambers (Cal Baptist)
- Kamille Diaz (Cal Baptist)
- Kelsey Keizer (Drake)
- Maiya Michel (Denver)

Legend

- (C) Team captain
- (S) Suspended
- (I) Ineligible
- (W) Walk-on
- Injured
- Current redshirt

Roster
Last update: March 11, 2025

== Schedule and results ==
Date time, TV	Rank^{#}	Opponent^{#}	Result	Record	High points	High rebounds	High assists	Site (attendance) city, state
Non-conference regular season
November 4, 2024*; 4:00 p.m., B1G+		at Oregon	L 63–93	0–1	16 – Schmidt	10 – Johansson	5 – Fiel	Matthew Knight Arena (4,141); Eugene, OR
November 9, 2024*; 4:00 p.m., ESPN+		at Liberty; WAC/C-USA Challenge	L 44–72	0–2	13 – Bosch Duran	6 – Schmidt	3 – Tu'ua	Liberty Arena (1,316); Lynchburg, VA
November 16, 2024*; 11:00 a.m., ESPN+		Pepperdine	L 64–75	0–3	34 – Schmidt	8 – Schmidt	9 – Tu'ua	Fowler Events Center (740); Riverside, CA
November 20, 2024*; 5:00 p.m., ESPN+		San Diego State	L 66–78	0–4	26 – Tu'ua	16 – Schmidt	6 – Tu'ua	Fowler Events Center (758); Riverside, CA
November 23, 2024*; 3:00 p.m., ESPN+		at Portland	L 66–85	0–5	14 – Schmidt	7 – Schmidt	6 – Tu'ua	Chiles Center (667); Portland, OR
November 26, 2024*; 6:00 p.m., ESPN+		Saint Louis	L 70–82	0–6	18 – Fiel	13 – Johansson	9 – Tu'ua	Fowler Events Center (461); Riverside, CA
November 29, 2024*; 1:00 p.m., ESPN+		at Florida Gulf Coast; Homewood Suites Classic	L 56–66	0–7	14 – Johansson	7 – Johansson	4 – 2 tied	Alico Arena (1,466); Fort Myers, FL
November 30, 2024*; 11:00 a.m.		vs. Penn; Homewood Suites Classic	L 51–64	0–8	20 – Schmidt	12 – Johansson	7 – Tu'ua	Alico Arena (47); Fort Myers, FL
December 3, 2024*; 6:30 p.m., BTN		at No. 6 USC	L 52–94	0–9	12 – Schmidt	7 – Schmidt	3 – Fiel	Galen Center (2,489); Los Angeles, CA
December 7, 2024*; 2:00 p.m., ESPN+		at Saint Mary's	W 71–68	1–9	20 – Tu'ua	8 – Schmidt	8 – Tu'ua	University Credit Union Pavilion (322); Moraga, CA
December 11, 2024*; 6:00 p.m., ESPN+		at Cal State Northridge	W 73–71	2–9	20 – Bosch Duran	7 – Johansson	7 – Tu'ua	Premier America Credit Union Arena (250); Northridge, CA
December 14, 2024*; 1:00 p.m., ESPN+		UC San Diego	L 58–81	2–10	12 – 2 tied	8 – Tu'ua	5 – 2 tied	Fowler Events Center (427); Riverside, CA
December 17, 2024*; 6:00 p.m., ESPN+		Middle Tennessee; WAC/C-USA Challenge	L 54–74	2–11	21 – Schmidt	7 – Schmidt	7 – Tu'ua	Fowler Events Center (395); Riverside, CA
December 19, 2024*; 1:00 p.m., ESPN+		Texas Southern	W 72–58	3–11	22 – Schmidt	17 – Schmidt	6 – Tu'ua	Fowler Events Center (181); Riverside, CA
WAC regular season
January 4, 2025; 1:00 p.m., ESPN+		at Seattle	W 70–64	4–11 (1–0)	18 – Lemon	7 – Schmidt	10 – Tu'ua	Redhawk Center (243); Seattle, WA
January 11, 2025; 12:00 p.m., ESPN+		Utah Valley	W 77–50	5–11 (2–0)	39 – Lemon	9 – Bosch Duran	6 – Fiel	Fowler Events Center (486); Riverside, CA
January 16, 2025; 11:00 a.m., ESPN+		Tarleton State	W 73–72	6–11 (3–0)	18 – Johansson	8 – Legaspi	9 – Fiel	Fowler Events Center (4,362); Riverside, CA
January 18, 2025; 1:00 p.m., ESPN+		Abilene Christian	L 55–71	6–12 (3–1)	20 – Lemon	7 – Legaspi	3 – Bosch Duran	Fowler Events Center (413); Riverside, CA
January 23, 2025; 5:00 p.m., ESPN+		at Utah Valley	L 50–59	6–13 (3–2)	11 – 2 tied	9 – Legaspi	4 – 2 tied	UCCU Center (509); Orem, UT
January 25, 2025; 1:00 p.m., ESPN+		Southern Utah	L 63–64	6–14 (3–3)	18 – Fiel	9 – Lemon	3 – Tu'ua	Fowler Events Center (426); Riverside, CA
January 30, 2025; 4:00 p.m., ESPN+		at Abilene Christian	W 87–84	7–14 (4–3)	29 – Lemon	6 – Tu'ua	7 – Tu'ua	Moody Coliseum (673); Abilene, TX
February 6, 2025; 5:30 p.m., ESPN+		at Southern Utah	W 69–66	8–14 (5–3)	20 – Bosch Duran	8 – 2 tied	6 – Tu'ua	America First Event Center (455); Cedar City, UT
February 8, 2025; 1:00 p.m., ESPN+		at Grand Canyon	L 55–84	8–15 (5–4)	10 – Nordstrom	8 – Legaspi	4 – Tu'ua	Global Credit Union Arena (923); Phoenix, AZ
February 13, 2025; 6:00 p.m., ESPN+		UT Arlington	W 90–79	9–15 (6–4)	25 – Lemon	8 – Schmidt	13 – Tu'ua	Fowler Events Center (398); Riverside, CA
February 15, 2025; 1:00 p.m., ESPN+		at Utah Tech	W 81–75	10–15 (7–4)	24 – Lemon	14 – Legaspi	7 – Tu'ua	Burns Arena (437); St. George, UT
February 22, 2025; 1:00 p.m., ESPN+		Grand Canyon	L 56–74	10–16 (7–5)	14 – 2 tied	7 – 3 tied	7 – Tu'ua	Fowler Events Center (720); Riverside, CA
February 27, 2025; 6:00 p.m., ESPN+		Seattle	W 81–68	11–16 (8–5)	22 – Lemon	9 – Legaspi	5 – 2 tied	Fowler Events Center (472); Riverside, CA
March 1, 2025; 1:00 p.m., ESPN+		Utah Tech	W 94–74	12–16 (9–5)	21 – Tu'ua	9 – Tu'ua	10 – Tu'ua	Fowler Events Center (589); Riverside, CA
March 6, 2025; 5:00 p.m., ESPN+		at Tarleton State	L 44–75	12–17 (9–6)	15 – Lemon	6 – Schmidt	2 – 2 tied	Wisdom Gym (2,750); Stephenville, TX
March 8, 2025; 12:00 p.m., ESPN+		at UT Arlington	L 73–87	12–18 (9–7)	24 – Lemon	8 – Legaspi	5 – Bosch Duran	College Park Center (1,177); Arlington, TX
WAC tournament
March 13, 2025; 2:30 p.m., ESPN+	(6)	vs. (3) UT Arlington; Quarterfinals	L 66–72	12–19	23 – Schmidt	9 – Schmidt	6 – Tu'ua	Orleans Arena (688); Paradise, NV
*Non-conference game. ^{#}Rankings from AP poll. (#) Tournament seedings in parentheses. All times are in Pacific.
