= 2024–25 Tarleton State Texans women's basketball team =

American college basketball season

2024–25 Tarleton State Texans women's basketball

WNIT, Second Round
- Conference: Western Athletic Conference
- Record: 20–14 (10–6 WAC)
- Head coach: Bill Brock (2nd season)
- Associate head coach: Geoff Golden
- Assistant coaches: Monique Whaley-Briggs; Brice Calip; Jake Clark
- Home arena: Wisdom Gym

2024–25 WAC women's basketball standings
	Conf.				Overall
Team	W		L	PCT	W		L	PCT
Grand Canyon †	16	–	0	1.000	32	–	3	.914
Tarleton	10	–	6	.625	20	–	14	.588
UT Arlington	10	–	6	.625	18	–	14	.563
Abilene Christian	9	–	7	.563	22	–	13	.629
Utah Valley	9	–	7	.563	19	–	13	.594
California Baptist	9	–	7	.563	12	–	19	.387
Southern Utah	7	–	9	.438	9	–	21	.300
Utah Tech	1	–	15	.063	6	–	25	.194
Seattle	1	–	15	.063	4	–	26	.133
† 2025 WAC tournament winner

The 2024–25 Tarleton State Texans women's basketball team represented Tarleton State University during the 2024–25 NCAA Division I women's basketball season. The Texans, led by second-year head coach Bill Brock, played their home games at the Wisdom Gym in Stephenville, Texas, as members of the Western Athletic Conference.

This was the Texans' last season at Wisdom Gym. Both men's and women's basketball will move to the new on-campus EECU Center for the 2025–26 season and beyond.

== Previous season ==
The Texans finished the 2023–24 season 11–20, 7–13 in WAC play, to finish in a tie for seventh place. They defeated Abilene Christian, before falling to Stephen F. Austin in the quarterfinals of the WAC tournament.

== Preseason ==
On October 16, 2024, the WAC released their preseason coaches poll. Tarleton State was picked to finish sixth in the WAC regular season.

=== Preseason rankings ===
WAC preseason poll
Predicted finish	Team	Votes (1st place)
1	Grand Canyon	59 (4)
2	California Baptist	58 (4)
3	UT Arlington	53 (1)
4	Abilene Christian	37
5	Southern Utah	33
6	Tarleton State	28
7	Utah Tech	24
8	Utah Valley	17
9	Seattle	15

=== Preseason All-WAC Team ===
No Texans were named to the Preseason All-WAC team.

== Roster ==
2024–25 Tarleton State Texans women's basketball team
Players
Coaches

Pos.	#	Name	Height	Year	Previous school	Hometown
G	00	Mylasia Smith	5 ft 6 in (1.68 m)	Fr	DeSoto High School	DeSoto, Texas
G	1	Mar'Cyah Willis	5 ft 7 in (1.7 m)	Fr	La Vega High School	Waco, Texas
F	2	Anya McKenzie	6 ft 2 in (1.88 m)	So	Ipswich Basketball Club	Luton, England
G	3	Niki Van Wyk	5 ft 7 in (1.7 m)	Sr	Black Hills State	Appleton, Wisconsin
G/F	4	Kyriana Jones	5 ft 10 in (1.78 m)	Jr	Dodge City Community College	Little Rock, Arkansas
G	5	Arieona Rosborough	5 ft 8 in (1.73 m)	Sr	Mary Hardin–Baylor	Mansfield, Texas
F	6	Andjela Bigović	6 ft 5 in (1.96 m)	Sr	Cochise College	Herceg Novi, Montenegro
G	10	Miannah Little	5 ft 6 in (1.68 m)	Sr	McLennan Community College	Waco, Texas
G	11	Jakoriah Long	5 ft 7 in (1.7 m)	Sr	Blinn College	Waco, Texas
G	12	Grace Booth	5 ft 10 in (1.78 m)	Fr	Glen Rose High School	Glen Rose, Texas
G	15	Karyn Sanford	6 ft 0 in (1.83 m)	Jr	Albany	Bergen, Norway
G	22	Tyler Jackson	5 ft 9 in (1.75 m)	Sr	Louisiana Tech	Allen, Texas
F	23	Alani Fluker	6 ft 1 in (1.85 m)	Sr	San Jose State	San Antonio, Texas
F	24	Elise Turrubiates	6 ft 0 in (1.83 m)	Sr	Frank Phillips College	Hobbs, New Mexico
C	55	Faith Acker	6 ft 2 in (1.88 m)	So	Winnsboro High School	Winnsboro, Texas

Head coach

- Bill Brock (SE Oklahoma State)

Assistant coach(es)

- Geoff Golden (Texas State)
- Monique Whaley-Briggs (North Carolina Central)
- Brice Calip (Missouri State)
- Jake Clark (Tarleton State)

Legend

- (C) Team captain
- (S) Suspended
- (I) Ineligible
- (W) Walk-on
- Injured
- Current redshirt

Roster
Last update: March 8, 2025

== Schedule and results ==
Date time, TV	Rank^{#}	Opponent^{#}	Result	Record	High points	High rebounds	High assists	Site (attendance) city, state
Exhibition
October 30, 2024*; 6:00 pm		Howard Payne	W 88–40	–	–	–	–	Wisdom Gym; Stephenville, TX
Non-conference regular season
November 4, 2024*; 12:00 pm, ESPN+		at UTEP; WAC/C-USA Challenge	L 49–52	0–1	18 – Fluker	6 – Tied	4 – Long	Don Haskins Center (2,055); El Paso, TX
November 7, 2024*; 7:00 pm, ESPN+		at Arizona	L 39–62	0–2	21 – Rosborough	9 – Rosborough	2 – Sanford	McKale Center (6,751); Tucson, AZ
November 12, 2024*; 11:00 am, ESPN+		New Orleans	W 57–48	1–2	11 – Tied	11 – Turrubiates	4 – Turrubiates	Wisdom Gym (840); Stephenville, TX
November 16, 2024*; 1:00 pm, ESPN+		Northwestern State	W 73–56	2–2	14 – Rosborough	8 – Acker	3 – Sanford	Wisdom Gym (677); Stephenville, TX
November 20, 2024*; 11:00 am, SECN+		at No. 4 Texas	L 41–83	2–3	11 – Rosborough	7 – Turrubiates	2 – Rosborough	Moody Center (6,173); Austin, TX
November 26, 2024*; 6:00 pm, ESPN+		at Houston Christian	W 48–42	3–3	17 – Little	9 – Turrubiates	2 – Tied	Sharp Gymnasium (523); Houston, TX
November 29, 2024*; 5:45 pm, YouTube		vs. Delaware; Big Easy Classic	W 54–40	4–3	17 – Acker	10 – Acker	3 – Tied	Alario Center (143); Westwego, LA
November 30, 2024*; 8:00 pm, YouTube		vs. Nicholls; Big Easy Classic	L 51–58	4–4	20 – Rosborough	8 – Turrubiates	3 – Little	Alario Center (191); Westwego, LA
December 4, 2024*; 7:00 pm, ESPN+		Texas State	L 59–71	4–5	16 – Rosborough	7 – Acker	1 – Tied	Wisdom Gym (927); Stephenville, TX
December 7, 2024*; 11:00 am, ESPN+		LeTourneau	W 99–34	5–5	15 – Booth	13 – Booth	4 – Tied	Wisdom Gym (581); Stephenville, TX
December 11, 2024*; 7:00 pm, B1G+		at No. 24 Nebraska	L 50–63	5–6	14 – Sanford	11 – Acker	5 – Van Wyk	Pinnacle Bank Arena (4,259); Lincoln, NE
December 16, 2024*; 11:00 am, ESPN+		New Mexico State; WAC/C-USA Challenge	W 65–55	6–6	18 – Acker	8 – Acker	2 – Tied	Wisdom Gym (676); Stephenville, TX
December 19, 2024*; 7:00 pm, ESPN+		at Arkansas State	W 78–68	7–6	22 – Rosborough	10 – Rosborough	7 – Rosborough	First National Bank Arena (426); Jonesboro, AR
December 21, 2024*; 2:00 pm, ESPN+		St. Mary's (TX)	W 64–31	8–6	9 – Van Wyk	9 – Acker	2 – Tied	Wisdom Gym (527); Stephenville, TX
December 29, 2024*; 2:00 pm, ESPN+		Texas Southern	W 67–55	9–6	18 – Rosborough	7 – Rosborough	4 – Sanford	Wisdom Gym (627); Stephenville, TX
WAC regular season
January 4, 2025; 2:00 pm, ESPN+		at UT Arlington	L 79–87	9–7 (0–1)	28 – Rosborough	8 – Rosborough	4 – Rosborough	College Park Center (1,041); Arlington, TX
January 9, 2025; 5:00 pm, ESPN+		Southern Utah	W 64–53	10–7 (1–1)	20 – Rosborough	11 – Turrubiates	4 – Rosborough	Wisdom Gym (282); Stephenville, TX
January 11, 2025; 2:00 pm, ESPN+		Utah Tech	W 74–65	11–7 (2–1)	17 – Van Wyk	10 – Acker	6 – Long	Wisdom Gym (276); Stephenville, TX
January 16, 2025; 1:00 pm, ESPN+		at California Baptist	L 72–73	11–8 (2–2)	16 – Van Wyk	6 – Tied	4 – Jackson	Fowler Events Center (4,362); Riverside, CA
January 18, 2025; 7:00 pm, ESPN+		Grand Canyon	L 53–57	11–9 (2–3)	12 – Rosborough	11 – Rosborough	3 – Tied	Wisdom Gym (1,009); Stephenville, TX
January 23, 2025; 7:00 pm, ESPN+		Abilene Christian	W 79–54	12–9 (3–3)	24 – Little	6 – Tied	7 – Rosborough	Wisdom Gym (1,234); Stephenville, TX
January 30, 2025; 8:00 pm, ESPN+		at Utah Tech	W 70–61	13–9 (4–3)	19 – Turrubiates	8 – Fluker	5 – Tied	Burns Arena (618); St. George, UT
February 1, 2025; 3:00 pm, ESPN+		at Southern Utah	W 74–53	14–9 (5–3)	21 – Long	8 – Turrubiates	4 – Rosborough	America First Event Center (376); Cedar City, UT
February 6, 2025; 7:00 pm, ESPN+		Seattle	W 77–46	15–9 (6–3)	25 – Long	8 – Acker	4 – Tied	Wisdom Gym (712); Stephenville, TX
February 8, 2025; 2:00 pm, ESPN+		Utah Valley	W 68–61	16–9 (7–3)	25 – Long	5 – Bigović	6 – Little	Wisdom Gym (567); Stephenville, TX
February 13, 2025; 7:00 pm, ESPN+		at Grand Canyon	L 60–76	16–10 (7–4)	18 – Long	8 – Long	3 – Rosborough	Global Credit Union Arena (604); Phoenix, AZ
February 15, 2025; 3:00 pm, ESPN+		at Seattle	W 79–76	17–10 (8–4)	19 – Rosborough	8 – Turrubiates	5 – Rosborough	Redhawk Center (144); Seattle, WA
February 22, 2025; 2:00 pm, ESPN+		UT Arlington	W 67–57	18–10 (9–4)	17 – Rosborough	11 – Acker	4 – Little	Wisdom Gym (1,387); Stephenville, TX
February 27, 2025; 6:00 pm, ESPN+		at Abilene Christian	L 56–59	18–11 (9–5)	16 – Little	8 – Rosborough	4 – Long	Moody Coliseum (759); Abilene, TX
March 6, 2025; 7:00 pm, ESPN+		California Baptist	W 75–44	19–11 (10–5)	26 – Long	9 – Long	6 – Rosborough	Wisdom Gym (2,750); Stephenville, TX
March 8, 2025; 3:00 pm, ESPN+		at Utah Valley	L 58–75	19–12 (10–6)	23 – Acker	9 – Acker	4 – Rosborough	UCCU Center (693); Orem, UT
WAC tournament
March 12, 2025; 4:30 pm, ESPN+	(2)	vs. (7) Southern Utah; Quarterfinals	W 59–40	20–12	16 – Tied	8 – Tied	4 – Tied	Orleans Arena (995); Paradise, NV
March 14, 2025; 4:30 pm, ESPN+	(2)	vs. (3) UT Arlington; Semifinals	L 55–66	20–13	12 – Tied	11 – Tied	3 – Rosborough	Orleans Arena (1,186); Paradise, NV
WNIT
March 23, 2025*; 2:00 pm, ESPN+		Lindenwood; Second Round	L 59–67	20–14	14 – Little	9 – Turrubiates	2 – Tied	Wisdom Gym (1,326); Stephenville, TX
*Non-conference game. ^{#}Rankings from AP poll. (#) Tournament seedings in parentheses. All times are in Central.
