= 2024–25 Western Athletic Conference women's basketball season =

2024–25 WAC women's basketball season
- League: NCAA Division I
- Sport: Basketball
- Teams: 9
- TV partner(s): ESPN, ESPN+

Regular season

WAC tournament

WAC women's basketball seasons
- ← 2023–24 2025–26 →

2024–25 WAC women's basketball standings
| | Conf. | | | | Overall |
| Team | W | | L | PCT | W | | L | PCT |
|---|---|---|---|---|---|---|---|---|
| Grand Canyon † | 16 | – | 0 | 1.000 | 32 | – | 3 | .914 |
| Tarleton | 10 | – | 6 | .625 | 20 | – | 14 | .588 |
| UT Arlington | 10 | – | 6 | .625 | 18 | – | 14 | .563 |
| Abilene Christian | 9 | – | 7 | .563 | 22 | – | 13 | .629 |
| Utah Valley | 9 | – | 7 | .563 | 19 | – | 13 | .594 |
| California Baptist | 9 | – | 7 | .563 | 12 | – | 19 | .387 |
| Southern Utah | 7 | – | 9 | .438 | 9 | – | 21 | .300 |
| Utah Tech | 1 | – | 15 | .063 | 6 | – | 25 | .194 |
| Seattle | 1 | – | 15 | .063 | 4 | – | 26 | .133 |
† 2025 WAC tournament winner

The 2024–25 WAC women's basketball season began with practices in October followed by the start of the 2024–25 NCAA Division I women's basketball season in early November 2024. The conference began play in January 2025. This is the WAC's 63rd season of basketball. The WAC competed with nine teams due to two teams having left the conference since the prior season. UTRGV and Stephen F. Austin both joined the Southland Conference since the prior year. The WAC tournament will be held in March 2025 with all nine teams competing for the automatic bid to the 2025 NCAA Division I women's basketball tournament. The opening round will be held at Burns Arena in St. George, Utah with the remaining rounds at the Orleans Arena in the Las Vegas-area community of Paradise, Nevada. This was the last WAC season for both Grand Canyon and Seattle, which announced that they would join the West Coast Conference the following year.

== Pre-season ==
=== WAC Media days ===
The WAC's 2024 women's basketball media day was held on October 16.

Women's Basketball Coaches Preseason Poll
| Place | Team | Points | First place votes |
|---|---|---|---|
| 1. | Grand Canyon | 59 | 4 |
| 2. | California Baptist | 58 | 4 |
| 3. | UT Arlington | 53 | 1 |
| 4. | Abilene Christian | 37 | -- |
| 5. | Southern Utah | 33 | -- |
| 6. | Tarleton | 28 | -- |
| 7. | Utah Tech | 24 | -- |
| 8. | Utah Valley | 17 | -- |
| 9 | Seattle U | 15 | -- |

=== WAC Preseason All-Conference ===
First Team

| Name | School | Yr. | Pos. |
|---|---|---|---|
| Trinity San Antonio† | Grand Canyon | Senior | G |
| Payton Hull | Abilene Christian | Sophomore | G |
| Tiarra Brown | Grand Canyon | Graduate | G/F |
| Daylani Ballena | Southern Utah | Graduate | G |
| Avery Brittingham | UT Arlington | Fifth year | F |

† Denotes Preseason Player of the Year

== Regular season ==
=== Early season tournaments ===
| Team | Tournament | Finish |
|---|---|---|
| Abilene Christian | FIU Thanksgiving Classic & Lobo Invitational | 1st & 1st |
| California Baptist | FGCU Homewood Suites Classic | 3rd |
| Grand Canyon | Talking Stick Resort Thanksgiving Classic & Have Fayth Christmas Classic | 1st & 1st |
| Seattle U | Talking Stick Resort Thanksgiving Classic | 2nd |
| Southern Utah | Nugget Classic | 4th |
| Tarleton | Big Easy Classic | 2nd |
| UT Arlington | N/A | --- |
| Utah Tech | N/A | --- |
| Utah Valley | USD Thanksgiving Classic | 2nd |

=== Conference USA-Western Athletic Conference Challenge ===
| Date | Conference USA team | WAC team | Score | Location | Leader |
|---|---|---|---|---|---|
| November 4 | UTEP | Tarleton | 52–49 | Don Haskins Center • El Paso, TX | CUSA (1–0) |
| November 7 | New Mexico State | Utah Tech | 85–63 | Pan American Center • Las Cruces, NM | CUSA (2–0) |
| November 8 | Florida International | Abilene Christian | 76–73 | Ocean Bank Convocation Center • Miami, FL | CUSA (2–1) |
| November 8 | Middle Tennessee | Grand Canyon | 57–47 | Murphy Center • Murfreesboro, TN | CUSA (3–1) |
| November 9 | Kennesaw State | Utah Valley | 64–61 | Convocation Center • Kennesaw, GA | CUSA (3–2) |
| November 9 | Jacksonville State | Southern Utah | 77–58 | Pete Mathews Coliseum • Jacksonville, FL | CUSA (4–2) |
| November 9 | Liberty | California Baptist | 72–44 | Liberty Arena • Lynchburg, VA | CUSA (5–2) |
| November 9 | Sam Houston | Seattle | 69–57 | Bernard Johnson Coliseum • Huntsville, TX | CUSA (6–2) |
| November 10 | Louisiana Tech | UT Arlington | 71–60 | Thomas Assembly Center • Ruston, LA | CUSA (7–2) |
| November 21 | Western Kentucky | Abilene Christian | 68–64 | Moody Coliseum • Abilene, TX | CUSA (8–2) |
| November 27 | Liberty | Grand Canyon | 79–50 | Global Credit Union Arena • Phoenix, AZ | CUSA (8–3) |
| December 14 | UTEP | Utah Tech | 71–57 | Burns Arena • St. George, UT | CUSA (9–3) |
| December 16 | Sam Houston | Southern Utah | 72–61 | America First Event Center • Cedar City, UT | CUSA (10–3) |
| December 16 | Kennesaw State | Seattle | 64–41 | Redhawk Center • Seattle, WA | CUSA (11–3) |
| December 16 | Jacksonville State | Utah Valley | 49–45 | UCCU Center • Orem, UT | CUSA (11–4) |
| December 16 | New Mexico State | Tarleton | 65–55 | Wisdom Gym • Stephenville, TX | CUSA (11–5) |
| December 16 | Florida International | UT Arlington | 72–56 | College Park Center • Arlington, TX | CUSA (11–6) |
| December 17 | Middle Tennessee | California Baptist | 74–54 | Fowler Events Center • Riverside, CA | CUSA (12–6) |
WINNERS ARE IN BOLD. HOME TEAM IN ITALICS. Rankings from AP Poll released prior to the game. Did not participate: none

=== Records against other conferences ===
2024–25 records against non-conference foes:

Regular season

| Power Conferences & Gonzaga | Record |
|---|---|
| ACC | 0–2 |
| Big East | 0–0 |
| Big Ten | 0–6 |
| Big 12 | 3–9 |
| Pac-12 | 0–0 |
| SEC | 0–2 |
| Gonzaga | 0–0 |
| Power Conference Total | 3–19 |
| Other NCAA Division I Conferences | Record |
| America East | 0–0 |
| American | 1–3 |
| A-10 | 0–2 |
| ASUN | 0–1 |
| Big Sky | 5–3 |
| Big South | 0–0 |
| Big West | 5–4 |
| CAA | 1–0 |
| C-USA | 7–12 |
| Horizon | 1–0 |
| Ivy League | 0–1 |
| MAAC | 0–0 |
| MAC | 0–1 |
| MEAC | 0–0 |
| MVC | 0–0 |
| Mountain West | 2–6 |
| NEC | 0–1 |
| OVC | 0–0 |
| Patriot League | 0–0 |
| SoCon | 0–0 |
| Southland | 10–3 |
| SWAC | 3–0 |
| Summit | 1–1 |
| Sun Belt | 2–1 |
| WCC (except Gonzaga) | 1–5 |
| Other Division I Total | 39–44 |
| Non-Division I Total | 16–0 |
| NCAA Division I Total | 42–63 |

=== Record against ranked non-conference opponents ===
This is a list of games against ranked opponents only (rankings from the AP poll/Coaches poll):

| Date | Visitor | Home | Score |
|---|---|---|---|
| November 18 | Grand Canyon | #23 Oregon | L, 54–70 |
| November 20 | Tarleton | #4 Texas | L, 41–83 |
| December 3 | Cal Baptist | #6 USC | L, 52–94 |
| December 11 | Tarleton | #24 Nebraska | L, 50–63 |
| December 18 | Utah Tech | NR/#21 Baylor | L, 34–97 |

Team rankings are reflective of AP poll/Coaches poll when the game was played, not current or final ranking.

=== Rankings ===
| | Improvement in ranking |
| | Drop in ranking |
| RV | Received votes but were not ranked in Top 25 |
| NV | No votes received |

| | | Pre | Wk 2 | Wk 3 | Wk 4 | Wk 5 | Wk 6 | Wk 7 | Wk 8 | Wk 9 | Wk 10 | Wk 11 | Wk 12 | Wk 13 | Wk 14 | Wk 15 | Wk 16 | Wk 17 | Wk 18 | Wk 19 | Wk 20 | Final |
|---|---|---|---|---|---|---|---|---|---|---|---|---|---|---|---|---|---|---|---|---|---|---|
| Abilene Christian | AP | NV | NV | NV | NV | NV | NV | NV | NV | NV | NV | NV | NV | NV | NV | NV | NV | NV | NV | NV | NV | NV |
| Abilene Christian | C | NV | NV | NV | NV | NV | NV | NV | NV | NV | NV | NV | NV | NV | NV | NV | NV | NV | NV | NV | NV | NV |
| California Baptist | AP | NV | NV | NV | NV | NV | NV | NV | NV | NV | NV | NV | NV | NV | NV | NV | NV | NV | NV | NV | NV | NV |
| California Baptist | C | NV | NV | NV | NV | NV | NV | NV | NV | NV | NV | NV | NV | NV | NV | NV | NV | NV | NV | NV | NV | NV |
| Grand Canyon | AP | NV | NV | NV | NV | NV | NV | NV | NV | NV | NV | NV | NV | NV | NV | RV | NV | NV | NV | NV | NV | NV |
| Grand Canyon | C | NV | NV | NV | NV | NV | NV | NV | NV | NV | NV | NV | NV | NV | NV | NV | NV | NV | NV | NV | NV | NV |
| Seattle U | AP | NV | NV | NV | NV | NV | NV | NV | NV | NV | NV | NV | NV | NV | NV | NV | NV | NV | NV | NV | NV | NV |
| Seattle U | C | NV | NV | NV | NV | NV | NV | NV | NV | NV | NV | NV | NV | NV | NV | NV | NV | NV | NV | NV | NV | NV |
| Southern Utah | AP | NV | NV | NV | NV | NV | NV | NV | NV | NV | NV | NV | NV | NV | NV | NV | NV | NV | NV | NV | NV | NV |
| Southern Utah | C | NV | NV | NV | NV | NV | NV | NV | NV | NV | NV | NV | NV | NV | NV | NV | NV | NV | NV | NV | NV | NV |
| Tarleton | AP | NV | NV | NV | NV | NV | NV | NV | NV | NV | NV | NV | NV | NV | NV | NV | NV | NV | NV | NV | NV | NV |
| Tarleton | C | NV | NV | NV | NV | NV | NV | NV | NV | NV | NV | NV | NV | NV | NV | NV | NV | NV | NV | NV | NV | NV |
| UT Arlington | AP | NV | NV | NV | NV | NV | NV | NV | NV | NV | NV | NV | NV | NV | NV | NV | NV | NV | NV | NV | NV | NV |
| UT Arlington | C | NV | NV | NV | NV | NV | NV | NV | NV | NV | NV | NV | NV | NV | NV | NV | NV | NV | NV | NV | NV | NV |
| Utah Tech | AP | NV | NV | NV | NV | NV | NV | NV | NV | NV | NV | NV | NV | NV | NV | NV | NV | NV | NV | NV | NV | NV |
| Utah Tech | C | NV | NV | NV | NV | NV | NV | NV | NV | NV | NV | NV | NV | NV | NV | NV | NV | NV | NV | NV | NV | NV |
| Utah Valley | AP | NV | NV | NV | NV | NV | NV | NV | NV | NV | NV | NV | NV | NV | NV | NV | NV | NV | NV | NV | NV | NV |
| Utah Valley | C | NV | NV | NV | NV | NV | NV | NV | NV | NV | NV | NV | NV | NV | NV | NV | NV | NV | NV | NV | NV | NV |

== Head coaches ==
=== Coaching changes ===
No coaching changes were made during the offseason.

=== Coaches ===
Note: Stats shown are before the beginning of the season. Overall and WAC records are from time at current school.

| Team | Head coach | Previous job | Seasons at school | Overall record | WAC record | WAC titles | NCAA tournaments | NCAA Final Fours | NCAA Championships |
|---|---|---|---|---|---|---|---|---|---|
| Abilene Christian | Julie Goodenough | Charleston Southern | 13th | 228–130 (.637) | 138–75(.648) | 2 | 1 | 0 | 0 |
| California Baptist | Jarrod Olson | Florida Southern | 13th | 133–54 (.711) | 76–26 (.745) | 2 | 1 | 0 | 0 |
| Grand Canyon | Molly Miller | Drury | 5th | 85–35 (.708) | 50–18 (.735) | 0 | 0 | 0 | 0 |
| Seattle U | Skyler Young | Portland (assistant) | 2nd | 6–23 (.207) | 6–14 (.300) | 0 | 0 | 0 | 0 |
| Southern Utah | Tracy Mason | St. Mary's (associate HC) | 7th | 84–87 (.491) | 22–16 (.579) | 1 | 1 | 0 | 0 |
| Tarleton | Bill Brock | McLennan Community College | 2nd | 12–20 (.375) | 7–13 (.350) | 0 | 0 | 0 | 0 |
| UT Arlington | Shereka Wright | Vanderbilt (associate HC) | 5th | 64–48 (.571) | 41–27 (.603) | 0 | 1 | 0 | 0 |
| Utah Tech | JD Gustin | Weber State (assistant) | 9th | 48–47 (.505) | 28–28 (.500) | 0 | 0 | 0 | 0 |
| Utah Valley | Dan Nielson | BYU (associate HC) | 6th | 57–81 (.413) | 37–48 (.435) | 0 | 1 | 0 | 0 |

Notes:

- Overall and WAC records, conference titles, etc. are from time at current school and are through the end of the 2023–24 season.
- Records and season totals only include time spent at Division I as head coach.
- NCAA tournament appearances are from time at current school only.
- NCAA Final Fours and Championship include time at other schools.

== Postseason ==
=== WAC tournament ===
The WAC tournament was held in March 2025 with all nine teams competing for the automatic bid to the 2025 NCAA Division I men's basketball tournament. The opening round was held at Burns Arena in St. George, Utah with the remaining rounds at the Orleans Arena in the Las Vegas-area community of Paradise, Nevada. Grand Canyon won the tournament by defeating UT Arlington 65–62 in the championship game.

=== NCAA tournament ===
Teams from the conference that were selected to participate: 1

| Seed | Region | School | First Four | First round | Second round | Sweet Sixteen | Elite Eight | Final Four | Championship |
|---|---|---|---|---|---|---|---|---|---|
| 13 | Spokane | Grand Canyon | N/A | lost to Baylor 60–73 | – | – | – | – | – |
| | Bids | W-L (%): | 0–0 (–) | 0–1 (.000) | 0–0 (–) | 0–0 (–) | 0–0 (–) | 0–0 (–) | TOTAL: 0–1 (.000) |

=== Women's Basketball Invitation Tournament ===
Number from the conference that were selected to participate: 0

| Seed | School | First round | Quarterfinals | Semifinals | Finals |
|---|---|---|---|---|---|
| | | – | – | – | – |
| | W-L (%): | 0–0 (–) | 0–0 (–) | 0–0 (–) | TOTAL: 0–0 (–) |

=== Women's National Invitation Tournament ===
Number from the conference that were selected to participate: 4

| Seed | School | First round | Second round | Super 16 | Great 8 | Semifinals | Finals |
|---|---|---|---|---|---|---|---|
| N/A | Tarleton | N/A | lost to Lindenwood 59–67 | – | – | – | – |
| N/A | Abilene Christian | defeated Northwestern State 86–59 | defeated Central Arkansas 75–53 | lost to Illinois State 68–78 | – | – | – |
| N/A | Utah Valley | defeated Air Force 70–64 | lost to Washington State 54–57 | – | – | – | – |
| N/A | UT Arlington | defeated Incarnate Word 78–52 | lost to North Texas 67–78 | – | – | – | – |
| | W-L (%): | 3–0 (1.000) | 1–3 (.250) | 0–1 (.000) | 0–0 (–) | 0–0 (–) | TOTAL: 4–4 (.500) |

Index to colors and formatting
WAC member won
WAC member lost

*Denotes overtime period

== Awards and honors ==
=== Players of the week ===
Throughout the conference regular season, the WAC offices name a player of the week and a newcomer of the week each Monday.

| Week | Player of the Week | School | Newcomer of the Week | School |
|---|---|---|---|---|
| November 11 | Bella Earle | Abilene Christian | Danja Stafford Collins | Utah Valley |
| November 18 | Alyssa Durazo-Frescas | Grand Canyon | Alyssa Durazo-Frescas | Grand Canyon |
| November 25 | Chardonnay Hartley | Utah Tech | Aaliyah Ibarra | Utah Tech |
| December 2 | Payton Hull | Abilene Christian | Taisiya Kozlova | Seattle |
| December 9 | Trinity San Antonio | Grand Canyon | Koi Love | UT Arlington |
| December 16 | Laura Erikstrup | Grand Canyon | Alyssa Durazo-Frescas (2) | Grand Canyon |
| December 23 | Payton Hull (2) | Abilene Christian | Koi Love (2) | UT Arlington |
| December 31 | Laura Erikstrup (2) | Grand Canyon | Koi Love (3) | UT Arlington |
| January 6 | Avery Brittingham | UT Arlington | Koi Love (4) | UT Arlington |
| January 13 | Khloe Lemmon | California Baptist | Koi Love (5) | UT Arlington |
| January 20 | Laura Erikstrup (3) | Grand Canyon | Emma Johansson | California Baptist |
| January 27 | Miannah Little | Tarleton State | Koi Love (6) | UT Arlington |
| February 3 | Avery Brittingham (2) | UT Arlington | Koi Love (7) | UT Arlington |
| February 10 | Jakoriah Long | Tarleton State | Koi Love (8) | UT Arlington |
| February 17 | Trinity San Antonio (2) | Grand Canyon | Candy Edokpaigbe | Seattle |
| February 24 | Trinity San Antonio (3) | Grand Canyon | Alyssa Durazo-Frescas (3) | Grand Canyon |
| March 3 | Trinity San Antonio (4) | Grand Canyon | Paige Cofer | Utah Tech |
| March 9 | Halle Nelson | Utah Valley | Koi Love (9) | UT Arlington |

==== Totals per school - Players of the week ====
| School | Player of the week | Newcomer of the week | Total |
|---|---|---|---|
| Abilene Christian University | 3 | | 3 |
| California Baptist University | 1 | 1 | 2 |
| Grand Canyon University | 8 | 3 | 11 |
| Seattle University | | 2 | 2 |
| Southern Utah University | | | |
| Tarleton State University | 2 | | 2 |
| University of Texas at Arlington | 2 | 9 | 11 |
| Utah Tech University | 1 | 2 | 3 |
| Utah Valley University | 1 | 1 | 2 |
| Total | 18 | 18 | 36 |

=== All-WAC ===
First team

| Name | School |
|---|---|
| Bella Earle | Abilene Christian |
| Trinity San Antonio‡ | Grand Canyon |
| Tiarra Brown | Grand Canyon |
| Avery Brittingham | UT Arlington |
| Koi Love | UT Arlington |

- ‡ WAC Player of the Year

Second team

| Name | School |
|---|---|
| Meredith Mayes | Abilene Christian |
| Khloe Lemon | California Baptist |
| Alyssa Durazo-Frescas | Grand Canyon |
| Laura Erikstrup | Grand Canyon |
| Jakoriah Long | Tarleton |

==== All-Freshman team ====
| Name | School |
|---|---|
| CeCe Legaspi† | California Baptist |
| Candy Edokpaigbe | Seattle |
| Kendal Robinson | UT Robinson |
| Ellie Taylor | Utah Tech |
| Cambree Blackman | Utah Valley |

† Freshman of the Year

==== All-Defensive team ====
| Name | School |
|---|---|
| Bella Earle | Abilene Christian |
| Callie Cooper | Grand Canyon |
| Trinity San Antonio | Grand Canyon |
| Tiarra Brown‡ | Grand Canyon |
| Tahlia White | Utah Valley |

- ‡WAC Defensive Player of the Year

==== Other awards ====
Sixth Woman of the Year: Aspen Thornton, UT Arlington and Kylee Mabry, Utah Valley

Coach of the Year: Molly Miller, Grand Canyon

== 2025 WNBA draft ==
| Round | Pick | Player | Position | Nationality | Team | School/club team |
|---|---|---|---|---|---|---|
| − | − | | | | − | |

== Home game attendance ==
| Team | Stadium | Capacity | Game 1 | Game 2 | Game 3 | Game 4 | Game 5 | Game 6 | Game 7 | Game 8 | Game 9 | Game 10 | Game 11 | Game 12 | Game 13 | Game 14 | Game 15 | Game 16 | Game 17 | Game 18 | Game 19 | Total | Average | % of Capacity |
|---|---|---|---|---|---|---|---|---|---|---|---|---|---|---|---|---|---|---|---|---|---|---|---|---|
| Abilene Christian | Moody Coliseum | 3,600 | 652 | 2,207† | 709 | 624 | 348 | 728 | 705 | 988 | 703 | 504 | 673 | 723 | 960 | 759 | 692 | | | | | 11,975 | 798 | 22% |
| California Baptist | CBU Events Center | 5,050 | 740 | 758 | 461 | 427 | 395 | 181 | 486 | 4,362† | 413 | 426 | 398 | 720 | 472 | 589 | | | | | | 10,828 | 773 | 15% |
| Grand Canyon | GCU Arena | 7,000 | 552 | 534 | 482 | 398 | 511 | 407 | 298 | 134 | 512 | 325 | 1,689† | 1,160 | 698 | 1,584 | 923 | 604 | 874 | 1,156 | 1,447 | 14,288 | 752 | 11% |
| Seattle U | Redhawk Center | 999 | 536 | 164 | 247 | 143 | 243 | 275 | 396 | 162 | 144 | 214 | 212 | 706† | | | | | | | | 3,442 | 287 | 29% |
| Southern Utah | America First Event Center | 5,300 | 355 | 369 | 349 | 266 | 201 | 309 | 346 | 414 | N/A | 376 | 455 | 480 | 536 | 570† | | | | | | 5,026 | 387 | 7% |
| Tarleton State | Wisdom Gymnasium | 3,000 | 840 | 677 | 927 | 581 | 676 | 527 | 627 | 282 | 276 | 1,009 | 1,234 | 712 | 587 | 1,387 | 2,750† | | | | | 13,092 | 873 | 29% |
| UT Arlington | College Park Center | 7,000 | 1,161 | 256 | 901 | 734 | 795 | 1,041 | N/A | 867 | 1,303† | 1,124 | 904 | 1,247 | 1,177 | | | | | | | 11,510 | 959 | 14% |
| Utah Tech | Burns Arena | 4,779 | 1,841† | 327 | 665 | 467 | 260 | 377 | 358 | 543 | 699 | 618 | 510 | 990 | 437 | 386 | 700 | | | | | 9,178 | 612 | 13% |
| Utah Valley | Lockhart Arena/UCCU Center | 2,000/8,500 | 539 | 636 | 457 | 474 | 381‡ | 422 | 483 | 509 | 577 | 1,313†‡ | 682‡ | 740 | 588 | 693 | | | | | | 8,494 | 607 | 7% |
| Total | | 62.329 | | | | | | | | | | | | | | | | | | | | 87,833 | 6,048 | 16% |

Bold – At or exceed capacity; capacity ratios for Utah Valley computed based on larger home arena; attendance is for regular season only

- †Season high
- ‡Lockhart Arena

== See also ==
- 2024-25 Western Athletic Conference men's basketball season
