= 2025 WAC women's basketball tournament =

Postseason men's basketball tournament

- Classification: Division I
- Season: 2024–25
- Teams: 9
- Site: Orleans Arena; Paradise, Nevada
- Champions: Grand Canyon
- Winning coach: Molly Miller (1st title)
- MVP: Trinty San Antonio (Grand Canyon)
- Attendance: 2,347 (Championship game)
- Television: ESPN+, ESPNU

2024–25 WAC women's basketball standings
	Conf.				Overall
Team	W		L	PCT	W		L	PCT
Grand Canyon †	16	–	0	1.000	32	–	3	.914
Tarleton	10	–	6	.625	20	–	14	.588
UT Arlington	10	–	6	.625	18	–	14	.563
Abilene Christian	9	–	7	.563	22	–	13	.629
Utah Valley	9	–	7	.563	19	–	13	.594
California Baptist	9	–	7	.563	12	–	19	.387
Southern Utah	7	–	9	.438	9	–	21	.300
Utah Tech	1	–	15	.063	6	–	25	.194
Seattle	1	–	15	.063	4	–	26	.133
† 2025 WAC tournament winner

The 2025 WAC women's basketball tournament was the postseason women's basketball tournament of the Western Athletic Conference (WAC) for the 2024–25 NCAA Division I women's basketball season. The tournament was played from March 11–15, 2025 with the opening round at Burns Arena in St. George, Utah and the remaining rounds at the Orleans Arena in Paradise, Nevada near Las Vegas. Burns Arena is the home court for WAC member Utah Tech. The last time that a WAC tournament game was held at the location of a WAC member was in 2010. This was the 15th year that the tournament was held at the Orleans Arena. The winner, Grand Canyon, received the conference's automatic bid to the NCAA tournament. California Baptist was the winner of the 2024 tournament.

== Seeds ==
All nine members were invited to the tournament. The field for the WAC tournament has varied from six to twelve qualifiers. All teams are eligible for the NCAA tournament including Tarleton and Utah Tech which completed their transition to Division I in 2024. For the prior two years, the WAC Tournament has been seeded using the WAC Resume Seeding System. For the 2025 WAC Tournament, seeding was determined by conference record with ties broken first by head to head competition, then by the WAC resume seeding.

Seed	School	Conference record	Tiebreak 1	Tiebreak 2 / WAC Seeding Points*
1	Grand Canyon	16–0		8.523
2	Tarleton	10–6	1–1 vs. UT Arlington	-0.628
3	UT Arlington	10–6	1–1 vs. Tarleton	-1.385
4	Abilene Christian	9–7	2–2 vs. Utah Valley/California Baptist	0.042
5	Utah Valley	9–7	2–2 vs. Abilene Christian/California Baptist	-1.754
6	California Baptist	9–7	2–2 vs. Abilene Christian/Utah Valley	-4.666
7	Southern Utah	7–9		-8.226
8	Utah Tech	1–15	1–1 vs. Seattle	-12.869
9	Seattle	1–15	1–1 vs. Utah Tech	-13.633

*Estimated based on information in the March 7, 2025 WAC Résumé Seeding System update. The WAC did not release the final regular-season point totals.

== Schedule ==
Session	Game	Time*	Matchup^{#}	Score	Television	Attendance
First round – Tuesday, March 11, 2025 – Burns Arena, St. George, Utah†
1	1	12:00pm MDT	No. 9 Seattle vs. No. 8 Utah Tech	60–74	ESPN+	233
Quarterfinals – Wednesday, March 12, 2025 – Orleans Arena, Paradise, Nevada
2	2	12:00pm PDT	No. 1 Grand Canyon vs. No. 8 Utah Tech	71–47	ESPN+	995
2	3	2:30pm PDT	No. 2 Tarleton vs. No. 7 Southern Utah	59–40	ESPN+	995
Quarterfinals – Thursday, March 13, 2025 – Orleans Arena, Paradise, Nevada
3	4	12:00pm PDT	No. 5 Utah Valley vs. No. 4 Abilene Christian	75–65	ESPN+	688
3	5	2:30pm PDT	No. 6 California Baptist vs. No. 3 UT Arlington	66–72	ESPN+	688
Semifinals – Friday, March 14, 2025 – Orleans Arena, Paradise, Nevada
4	6	12:00pm PDT	No. 1 Grand Canyon vs. No. 5 Utah Valley	84–55	ESPN+	1,186
4	7	2:30pm PDT	No. 2 Tarleton vs. No. 3 UT Arlington	55–66	ESPN+	1,186
Championship – Saturday, March 15, 2025 – Orleans Arena, Paradise, Nevada
5	8	12:30pm PDT	No. 1 Grand Canyon vs. No. 3 UT Arlington	65–62	ESPNU	2,347
*Game times in Nevada in PDT. #-Rankings denote tournament seeding.†-St. George, Utah is located in the Mountain Time Zone

== Bracket ==
First round Tuesday, March 11; Burns Arena, St. George, Utah; ESPN+
8	Utah Tech	74
9	Seattle	60

Quarterfinals; Wednesday and Thursday, March 12-13; Orleans Arena, Paradise, Nevada; ESPN+
1	Grand Canyon	71
8	Utah Tech	47
4	Abilene Christian	65
5	Utah Valley	75
3	UT Arlington	72
6	California Baptist	66
2	Tarleton	59
7	Southern Utah	40

Semifinals; Friday, March 14; Orleans Arena, Paradise, Nevada; ESPN+
1	Grand Canyon	84
5	Utah Valley	55
3	UT Arlington	66
2	Tarleton	55

Championship; Saturday, March 15; Orleans Arena, Paradise, Nevada; ESPNU
1	Grand Canyon	65
3	UT Arlington	62

== Awards ==
Award	Player	Team
Most Outstanding Player	Trinity San Antonio	Grand Canyon
All-Tournament Team	Koi Love	UT Arlington
	Avery Brittingham	UT Arlington
	Laura Erikstrup	Grand Canyon
	Alyssa Durazo-Frescas	Grand Canyon

== See also ==
- 2025 WAC men's basketball tournament
