= United Athletic Conference women's basketball tournament =

Women's college basketball conference tournament

- Conference basketball championship
- Sport: College basketball
- Conference: United Athletic Conference
- Number of teams: 9
- Format: Single-elimination tournament
- Current stadium: Credit Union of Texas Event Center
- Current location: Allen, Texas
- Played: 1991–present
- Last contest: 2024
- Current champion: California Baptist (3rd)
- Most championships: Louisiana Tech (5)
- Official website: UACSports.com Women's Basketball

The United Athletic Conference women's basketball tournament is the conference championship tournament in basketball for the United Athletic Conference (UAC). The UAC, known before the 2026–27 season as the Western Athletic Conference, has held a postseason tournament to crown a women's basketball champion every year since 1991. At first the regular season champion hosted it but at its height, the tournament was held at larger urban venues. With the departure of the Mountain West Conference teams, the tournament had returned to campus, with each game in the tournament being held in one campus venue, each year. From 2011 through the conference's 2026 renaming, the tournament was held at the Orleans Arena, part of the Orleans Hotel and Casino in Las Vegas. With the conference renaming, coinciding with the departure of all of its members west of Texas, the tournament moved to the Dallas–Fort Worth city of Allen, Texas at the Credit Union of Texas Event Center.

The winner of the UAC tournament is normally guaranteed a berth into the NCAA Division I women's basketball tournament every year. An exception to this was in 2021, when California Baptist won the WAC tournament but was ineligible for the NCAA tournament because the school was in the midst of its transition from NCAA Division II to Division I.

Starting with the 2023 tournament, the WAC (now UAC) adopted a new seeding system based on advanced team metrics, developed in large part by statistical guru Ken Pomeroy. Tournament entry will still be based on conference record.

== Results ==
Year	Champion	Score	Runner-up	Location
1991	Utah	86–69	Creighton	Arena-Auditorium (Laramie, Wyoming)
1992	Creighton	74–63	Utah	Salt Lake City
1993	BYU	53–50	Utah	Delta Center (Salt Lake City)
1994	San Diego State	51–47	Colorado State	Delta Center (Salt Lake City)
1995	Utah	64–57	San Diego State	The Pit (Albuquerque, New Mexico)
1996	Colorado State	72–65	New Mexico	The Pit (Albuquerque, New Mexico)
1997	San Diego State	56–50	Utah	Thomas & Mack Center (Las Vegas, Nevada)
1998	New Mexico	69–48	Rice	Thomas & Mack Center (Las Vegas, Nevada)
1999	SMU	65–49	Colorado State	Thomas & Mack Center (Las Vegas, Nevada)
2000	Rice	71–67	SMU	Selland Arena (Fresno, California)
2001	TCU	66–58	Hawaii	Reynolds Center (Tulsa, Oklahoma)
2002	Louisiana Tech	53–50	Hawaii	Reynolds Center (Tulsa, Oklahoma)
2003	Louisiana Tech	89–57	Fresno State	Reynolds Center (Tulsa, Oklahoma)
2004	Louisiana Tech	76–52	Rice	Save Mart Center (Fresno, California)
2005	Rice	86–66	Louisiana Tech	Lawlor Events Center (Reno, Nevada)
2006	Louisiana Tech	63–39	New Mexico State	Lawlor Events Center (Reno, Nevada)
2007	Boise State	49–39	New Mexico State	Pan American Center (Las Cruces, New Mexico)
2008	Fresno State	72–56	New Mexico State	Pan American Center (Las Cruces, New Mexico)
2009	Fresno State	56–49	Nevada	Lawlor Events Center (Reno, Nevada)
2010	Louisiana Tech	68–66	Fresno State	Lawlor Events Center (Reno, Nevada)
2011	Fresno State	78–76	Louisiana Tech	Orleans Arena (Las Vegas, Nevada)
2012	Fresno State	89–61	Louisiana Tech	Orleans Arena (Las Vegas, Nevada)
2013	Idaho	67–64	Seattle	Orleans Arena (Las Vegas, Nevada)
2014	Idaho	75–67	Seattle	Orleans Arena (Las Vegas, Nevada)
2015	New Mexico State	70–52	Texas-Pan American	Orleans Arena (Las Vegas, Nevada)
2016	New Mexico State	80–53	Texas-Rio Grande Valley	Orleans Arena (Las Vegas, Nevada)
2017	New Mexico State	63–48	Seattle	Orleans Arena (Las Vegas, Nevada)
2018	Seattle	57–54	Cal State Bakersfield	Orleans Arena (Las Vegas, Nevada)
2019	New Mexico State	76–73 ^{2OT}	Texas–Rio Grande Valley	Orleans Arena (Las Vegas, Nevada)
2020	Canceled due to the COVID-19 pandemic.			
2021	California Baptist	78–60	Grand Canyon	Orleans Arena (Las Vegas, Nevada)
2022	Stephen F. Austin	74–57	Grand Canyon	Orleans Arena (Las Vegas, Nevada)
2023	Southern Utah	82–73	California Baptist	Orleans Arena (Las Vegas, Nevada)
2024	California Baptist	75–74	Stephen F. Austin	Orleans Arena (Las Vegas, Nevada)
2025	Grand Canyon	65–62	UT Arlington	Orleans Arena (Las Vegas, Nevada)
2026	California Baptist	74–58	Abilene Christian	Orleans Arena (Las Vegas, Nevada)
2027				Credit Union of Texas Event Center (Allen, Texas)

== Records ==
Year	Finals Record	Finals Appearances	Championship Years
Louisiana Tech	5–3	8	2002, 2003, 2004, 2006, 2010
New Mexico State	4–3	7	2015, 2016, 2017, 2019
Fresno State	4–2	6	2008, 2009, 2011, 2012
California Baptist	3–1	4	2021, 2024, 2026
Utah	2–3	5	1991, 1995
Rice	2–2	4	2000, 2005
San Diego State	2–1	3	1994, 1997
Idaho	2–0	2	2013, 2014
Seattle	1–3	4	2018
Colorado State	1–2	3	1996
SMU	1–1	2	1999
New Mexico	1–1	2	1998
Creighton	1–1	2	1992
Stephen F. Austin	1–1	2	2022
Boise State	1–0	1	2007
Southern Utah	1–0	1	2023
TCU	1–0	1	2001
BYU	1–0	1	1993
Grand Canyon	1–2	3	2025
UT Rio Grande Valley	0–3	3	
Hawai'i	0–2	2	
Abilene Christian	0–1	1	
Cal State Bakersfield	0–1	1	
Nevada	0–1	1	

Note: 2021 champion California Baptist began a transition from NCAA Division II in 2018 and thus was not eligible for NCAA-sponsored postseason play until the 2022–23 season.

- Schools highlighted in pink are former WAC members as of the upcoming 2026–27 UAC season.
- Records for UT Rio Grande Valley include those of UT Pan American. UTRGV was formally founded in 2013 and began operation in 2015 via the merger of UTPA and UT Brownsville. The UTPA athletic program and its history were transferred to UTRGV.
- The only current UAC members to have competed in at least one WAC tournament without reaching the title game are Tarleton State and UT Arlington. Tarleton joined from NCAA Division II in 2020 and under then-current WAC rules was ineligible to compete in the conference tournament until 2022–23; it first qualified for the WAC tournament in 2024. UTA competed in the 2013 tournament in the only season of its first WAC tenure; it rejoined for the 2022–23 season.

== See also ==
- United Athletic Conference men's basketball tournament
