= 2023–24 Abilene Christian Wildcats women's basketball team =

American college basketball season

2023–24 Abilene Christian Wildcats women's basketball
- Conference: Western Athletic Conference
- Record: 14–16 (10–10 WAC)
- Head coach: Julie Goodenough (12th season)
- Assistant coaches: Jake Stevens; Ethan McIlhargey; Kenisha Henry; Imani Robinson
- Home arena: Moody Coliseum

2023–24 WAC women's basketball standings
	Conf.				Overall
Team	W		L	PCT	W		L	PCT
California Baptist †	18	–	2	.900	28	–	4	.875
Grand Canyon	16	–	4	.800	24	–	8	.750
Stephen F. Austin	14	–	6	.700	21	–	12	.636
Utah Tech*	12	–	8	.600	18	–	14	.563
UT Arlington	11	–	9	.550	17	–	16	.515
Abilene Christian	10	–	10	.500	14	–	16	.467
Tarleton State*	7	–	13	.350	12	–	20	.375
Seattle	6	–	14	.300	6	–	23	.207
Southern Utah	6	–	14	.300	8	–	22	.267
UT Rio Grande Valley	5	–	15	.250	6	–	23	.207
Utah Valley	5	–	15	.250	10	–	19	.345
† 2024 WAC tournament winner * Ineligible for the 2024 NCAA tournament due to transition from Division II

The 2023–24 Abilene Christian Wildcats women's basketball team represented Abilene Christian University during the 2023–24 NCAA Division I women's basketball season. The Wildcats, who were led by 12th-year head coach Julie Goodenough, played their home games at Moody Coliseum in Abilene, Texas as members of the Western Athletic Conference (WAC).

== Previous season ==
The Wildcats finished the 2022–23 season 15–15, 9–9 in WAC play, to finish in seventh place. They were defeated by Sam Houston in the first round of the WAC tournament.

== Roster ==
2023–24 Abilene Christian Wildcats women's basketball team
Players
Coaches

Pos.	#	Name	Height	Year	Previous school	Hometown
G	3	Bella Earle	5 ft 10 in (1.78 m)	Jr	Denton Guyer High School	Corinth, TX
G/F	4	Kenadi Rising	5 ft 11 in (1.8 m)	Jr	Highland Community College	Rapid City, SD
G	5	Yle Exposito Perez	5 ft 7 in (1.7 m)	Jr	Trinidad State	Canary Islands, Spain
G	10	Payton Hull	5 ft 11 in (1.8 m)	Fr	Peaster High School	Peaster, TX
F	12	Addison Martin	6 ft 1 in (1.85 m)	RS So	Captain Shreve High School	Shreveport, LA
G	13	Zoe Jackson	5 ft 8 in (1.73 m)	Jr	Butler	McKinney, TX
C	14	Meredith Mayes	6 ft 2 in (1.88 m)	Fr	Bixby High School	Bixby, OK
G	20	Tristin Keller	5 ft 8 in (1.73 m)	So	Mason High School	Mason, TX
F	21	Clare Traeger	5 ft 10 in (1.78 m)	GS	Binghamton	Dallas, TX
G	22	Gracy Wernli	5 ft 9 in (1.75 m)	Fr	Bixby High School	Bixby, OK
G	23	Claire Graham	5 ft 9 in (1.75 m)	So	Jim Ned High School	Tuscola, TX
F	24	Emma Troxell	5 ft 11 in (1.8 m)	Fr	Bushland High School	Bushland, TX
F	32	Brooke Jessen	6 ft 1 in (1.85 m)	Sr	UT Rio Grande Valley	Spirit Lake, ID

Head coach

- Julie Goodenough (UT Arlington)

Assistant coach(es)

- Jake Stevens (Tarleton State)
- Ethan McIlhargey (Idaho)
- Kenisha Henry (Delta State)
- Imani Robinson (Incarnate Word)

Legend

- (C) Team captain
- (S) Suspended
- (I) Ineligible
- (W) Walk-on
- Injured
- Current redshirt

Roster
Last update: June 3, 2024

== Schedule and results ==
Date time, TV	Rank^{#}	Opponent^{#}	Result	Record	Site (attendance) city, state
Regular season
November 6, 2023*; 6:00 p.m., ESPN+		Southwestern Assemblies of God	W 77–52	1–0	Moody Coliseum (200); Abilene, TX
November 9, 2023*; 7:00 p.m., ESPN+		Rice	L 58–69	1–1	Moody Coliseum (1,040); Abilene, TX
November 16, 2023*; 11:00 a.m., ESPN+		Angelo State	W 65–57	2–1	Moody Coliseum (1,230); Abilene, TX
November 25, 2023*; 2:30 p.m.		vs. Towson; Navy Classic	L 56–63	2–2	Alumni Hall (170); Annapolis, MD
November 26, 2023*; 12:00 p.m., ESPN+		at Navy; Navy Classic	W 87–62	3–2	Alumni Hall (288); Annapolis, MD
November 29, 2023; 6:00 p.m., ESPN+		UT Arlington	W 94–76	4–2 (1–0)	Moody Coliseum (1,006); Abilene, TX
December 2, 2023; 2:00 p.m., ESPN+		at Stephen F. Austin	L 82–89 ^{2OT}	4–3 (1–1)	William R. Johnson Coliseum (1,148); Nacogdoches, TX
December 5, 2023*; 7:00 p.m., ESPN+		at TCU	L 60–77	4–4	Schollmaier Arena (1,781); Fort Worth, TX
December 11, 2023*; 6:00 p.m., ESPN+		McMurry	W 91–55	5–4	Moody Coliseum (977); Abilene, TX
December 18, 2023*; 6:30 p.m., ESPN+		at Western Kentucky	L 68–72	5–5	E. A. Diddle Arena (932); Bowling Green, KY
December 30, 2023*; 1:00 p.m., ESPN+		Louisiana Tech	L 49–66	5–6	Moody Coliseum (1,281); Abilene, TX
January 6, 2024; 2:00 p.m., ESPN+		at UT Rio Grande Valley	W 62–53	6–6 (2–1)	UTRGV Fieldhouse (422); Edinburg, TX
January 11, 2024; 6:00 p.m., ESPN+		Grand Canyon	L 55–64	6–7 (2–2)	Moody Coliseum (923); Abilene, TX
January 13, 2024; 1:00 p.m., ESPN+		California Baptist	W 96–93 ^{OT}	7–7 (3–2)	Moody Coliseum (933); Abilene, TX
January 18, 2024; 6:00 p.m., ESPN+		Tarleton State	W 73–51	8–7 (4–2)	Moody Coliseum (1,125); Abilene, TX
January 20, 2024; 2:00 p.m., ESPN+		at UT Arlington	L 65–74	8–8 (4–3)	College Park Center (859); Arlington, TX
January 25, 2024; 8:00 p.m., ESPN+		at Utah Tech	L 69–78	8–9 (4–4)	Burns Arena (596); St. George, UT
January 27, 2024; 3:00 p.m., ESPN+		at Southern Utah	L 80–82	8–10 (4–5)	America First Event Center (345); Cedar City, UT
February 1, 2024; 7:00 p.m., ESPN+		at Tarleton State	L 66–74	8–11 (4–6)	Wisdom Gym (1,555); Stephenville, TX
February 8, 2024; 6:00 p.m., ESPN+		Seattle	W 82–63	9–11 (5–6)	Moody Coliseum (1,151); Abilene, TX
February 10, 2024; 1:00 p.m., ESPN+		Utah Valley	W 66–53	10–11 (6–6)	Moody Coliseum (1,056); Abilene, TX
February 15, 2024; 6:00 p.m., ESPN+		UT Rio Grande Valley	W 76–69	11–11 (7–6)	Moody Coliseum (1,082); Abilene, TX
February 17, 2024; 1:00 p.m., ESPN+		Stephen F. Austin	L 83–89	11–12 (7–7)	Moody Coliseum (1,051); Abilene, TX
February 22, 2024; 8:00 p.m., ESPN+		at California Baptist	L 58–70	11–13 (7–8)	Fowler Events Center (337); Riverside, CA
February 24, 2024; 3:00 p.m., ESPN+		at Grand Canyon	L 55–66	11–14 (7–9)	Global Credit Union Arena (537); Phoenix, AZ
February 29, 2024; 6:00 p.m., ESPN+		Southern Utah	W 75–42	12–14 (8–9)	Moody Coliseum (1,023); Abilene, TX
March 2, 2024; 1:00 p.m., ESPN+		Utah Tech	W 74–62	13–14 (9–9)	Moody Coliseum (1,008); Abilene, TX
March 7, 2024; 8:00 p.m., ESPN+		at Seattle	L 54–59	13–15 (9–10)	Redhawk Center (239); Seattle, WA
March 9, 2024; 3:00 p.m., ESPN+		at Utah Valley	W 81–50	14–15 (10–10)	UCCU Center (571); Orem, UT
WAC tournament
March 13, 2024; 4:30 p.m., ESPN+	(6)	vs. (7) Tarleton State; First round	L 41–54	14–16	Orleans Arena (–); Paradise, NV
*Non-conference game. ^{#}Rankings from AP poll. (#) Tournament seedings in parentheses. All times are in Central.
