= 2023–24 Seattle Redhawks women's basketball team =

American college basketball season

2023–24 Seattle Redhawks women's basketball
- Conference: Western Athletic Conference
- Record: 6–23 (6–14 WAC)
- Head coach: Skyler Young (1st season)
- Assistant coaches: Michael Brooks; Rachel Swartz; GeAnna Luaulu-Summers; Makala Roper
- Home arena: Redhawk Center

2023–24 WAC women's basketball standings
	Conf.				Overall
Team	W		L	PCT	W		L	PCT
California Baptist †	18	–	2	.900	28	–	4	.875
Grand Canyon	16	–	4	.800	24	–	8	.750
Stephen F. Austin	14	–	6	.700	21	–	12	.636
Utah Tech*	12	–	8	.600	18	–	14	.563
UT Arlington	11	–	9	.550	17	–	16	.515
Abilene Christian	10	–	10	.500	14	–	16	.467
Tarleton State*	7	–	13	.350	12	–	20	.375
Seattle	6	–	14	.300	6	–	23	.207
Southern Utah	6	–	14	.300	8	–	22	.267
UT Rio Grande Valley	5	–	15	.250	6	–	23	.207
Utah Valley	5	–	15	.250	10	–	19	.345
† 2024 WAC tournament winner * Ineligible for the 2024 NCAA tournament due to transition from Division II

The 2023–24 Seattle Redhawks women's basketball team represented Seattle University during the 2023–24 NCAA Division I women's basketball season. The Redhawks, who were led by first-year head coach Skyler Young, played their home games at the Redhawk Center in Seattle, Washington as members of the Western Athletic Conference (WAC).

The Redhawks finished the season 6–23, 6–14 in WAC play, to finish in a tie for eighth place. They failed to qualify for the WAC tournament, as only the top eight teams qualified.

== Previous season ==
The Redhawks finished the 2022–23 season 6–24, 5–13 in WAC play, to finish in 11th place. They upset UT Arlington in the first round of the WAC tournament before falling to Grand Canyon in the quarterfinals.

On March 20, 2023, the school announced that head coach Suzy Barcomb would not be returning as their head coach, ending her seven-year run with the team. Almost a month later, on April 19, Portland assistant coach Skyler Young was hired as the Redhawks' new head coach.

== Roster ==
2023–24 Seattle Redhawks women's basketball team
Players
Coaches

Pos.	#	Name	Height	Year	Previous school	Hometown
G	1	Julianna Walker	5 ft 6 in (1.68 m)	Jr	Syracuse	Tacoma, WA
G	2	Aannah Interrante	5 ft 9 in (1.75 m)	GS	Bradley	Johnsburg, IL
G	3	Sareya Hicks	5 ft 6 in (1.68 m)	Jr	Great Falls Central Catholic High School	Great Falls, MT
G	4	Asta Blauenfeldt	5 ft 6 in (1.68 m)	So	Falkonergaardens	Kongens Lyngby, Denmark
G	5	Noemie Bariteau	5 ft 7 in (1.7 m)	So	Archbishop Mitty High School	San Jose, CA
G	11	Peyton Howard	5 ft 9 in (1.75 m)	Sr	Central Valley High School	Spokane, WA
F	13	Ramona Jagger	6 ft 2 in (1.88 m)	Sr	Decatur High School	Federal Way, WA
F	14	Mya Moore	6 ft 0 in (1.83 m)	So	Pius XI High School	Milwaukee, WI
G	15	Sheridan Liggett	5 ft 9 in (1.75 m)	So	Maple Mountain High School	Spanish Fork, UT
G	21	Erin Tarasow	5 ft 9 in (1.75 m)	Sr	Miramonte High School	Moraga, CA
G	22	Makayla Moore	6 ft 0 in (1.83 m)	So	Archbishop Mitty High School	San Jose, CA
F	23	Irena Korolenko	6 ft 0 in (1.83 m)	Sr	Cedar Park Christian School	Redmond, WA
F	34	Lisa Michaelsen	6 ft 1 in (1.85 m)	So	Stenhus	Holbæk, Denmark

Head coach

- Skyler Young (Western Michigan)

Assistant coach(es)

- Michael Brooks (Western Colorado)
- Rachel Swartz (Missouri State)
- GeAnna Luaulu-Summers (Pacific)
- Makala Roper (UC Santa Barbara)

Legend

- (C) Team captain
- (S) Suspended
- (I) Ineligible
- (W) Walk-on
- Injured
- Current redshirt

Roster
Last update: June 4, 2024

== Schedule and results ==
Date time, TV	Rank^{#}	Opponent^{#}	Result	Record	Site (attendance) city, state
Exhibition
November 2, 2023*; 6:00 p.m.		Evergreen State	W 85–56	–	Redhawk Center (–); Seattle, WA
Regular season
November 9, 2023*; 6:00 p.m., ESPN+		at Cal State Northridge	L 72–81 ^{OT}	0–1	Premier America Credit Union Arena (227); Northridge, CA
November 11, 2023*; 2:00 p.m., ESPN+		at UC Irvine	L 43–74	0–2	Bren Events Center (647); Irvine, CA
November 14, 2023*; 6:00 p.m., ESPN+		Portland	L 61–89	0–3	Redhawk Center (342); Seattle, WA
November 18, 2023*; 1:00 p.m.		at Washington	L 64–80	0–4	Alaska Airlines Arena (2,560); Seattle, WA
November 21, 2023*; 6:00 p.m., ESPN+		Cal Poly	L 43–68	0–5	Redhawk Center (295); Seattle, WA
November 25, 2023*; 2:00 p.m., ESPN+		at Portland State	L 68–75	0–6	Viking Pavilion (379); Portland, OR
November 29, 2023; 6:00 p.m., ESPN+		Utah Valley	W 58–48	1–6 (1–0)	Redhawk Center (302); Seattle, WA
December 2, 2023; 1:00 p.m., ESPN+		at Southern Utah	L 56–83	1–7 (1–1)	America First Event Center (341); Cedar City, UT
December 11, 2023*; 11:00 a.m., ESPN+		San Diego State	L 61–69	1–8	Redhawk Center (737); Seattle, WA
December 19, 2023*; 12:00 p.m., ESPN+		UTSA	L 64–75	1–9	Redhawk Center (339); Seattle, WA
December 31, 2023*; 1:00 p.m.		at Arizona	L 52–89	1–10	McKale Center (7,500); Tucson, AZ
January 4, 2024; 6:00 p.m., ESPN+		at Utah Tech	L 65–81	1–11 (1–2)	Burns Arena (405); St. George, UT
January 6, 2024; 1:00 p.m., ESPN+		at California Baptist	L 79–94	1–12 (1–3)	Fowler Events Center (421); Riverside, CA
January 11, 2024; 6:00 p.m., ESPN+		UT Rio Grande Valley	L 77–84	1–13 (1–4)	Redhawk Center (262); Seattle, WA
January 13, 2024; 1:00 p.m., ESPN+		UT Arlington	L 54–72	1–14 (1–5)	Redhawk Center (383); Seattle, WA
January 18, 2024; 6:00 p.m., ESPN+		Stephen F. Austin	L 66–82	1–15 (1–6)	Redhawk Center (286); Seattle, WA
January 20, 2024; 1:00 p.m., ESPN+		at Grand Canyon	L 73–84 ^{2OT}	1–16 (1–7)	Global Credit Union Arena (602); Phoenix, AZ
January 27, 2024; 1:00 p.m., ESPN+		at Utah Valley	L 56–59	1–17 (1–8)	UCCU Center (512); Orem, UT
February 1, 2024; 6:00 p.m., ESPN+		Grand Canyon	L 40–53	1–18 (1–9)	Redhawk Center (262); Seattle, WA
February 3, 2024; 1:00 p.m., ESPN+		California Baptist	L 77–86	1–19 (1–10)	Redhawk Center (375); Seattle, WA
February 8, 2024; 4:00 p.m., ESPN+		at Abilene Christian	L 63–82	1–20 (1–11)	Moody Coliseum (1,151); Abilene, TX
February 10, 2024; 12:00 p.m., ESPN+		at Tarleton State	W 61–57	2–20 (2–11)	Wisdom Gym (618); Stephenville, TX
February 15, 2024; 6:00 p.m., ESPN+		Southern Utah	W 75–71	3–20 (3–11)	Redhawk Center (294); Seattle, WA
February 17, 2024; 1:00 p.m., ESPN+		Utah Tech	L 75–89	3–21 (3–12)	Redhawk Center (280); Seattle, WA
February 22, 2024; 4:30 p.m., ESPN+		at Stephen F. Austin	L 62–87	3–22 (3–13)	William R. Johnson Coliseum (1,585); Nacogdoches, TX
February 24, 2024; 12:00 p.m., ESPN+		at UT Rio Grande Valley	W 82–75	4–22 (4–13)	UTRGV Fieldhouse (421); Edinburg, TX
February 29, 2024; 4:00 p.m., ESPN+		at UT Arlington	W 81–77	5–22 (5–13)	College Park Center (1,025); Arlington, TX
March 7, 2024; 6:00 p.m., ESPN+		Abilene Christian	W 59–54	6–22 (6–13)	Redhawk Center (239); Seattle, WA
March 9, 2024; 1:00 p.m., ESPN+		Tarleton State	L 57–62	6–23 (6–14)	Redhawk Center (701); Seattle, WA
*Non-conference game. ^{#}Rankings from AP poll. (#) Tournament seedings in parentheses. All times are in Pacific.
