= 2023–24 Utah Valley Wolverines women's basketball team =

Intercollegiate basketball season

2023–24 Utah Valley Wolverines women's basketball
- Conference: Western Athletic Conference
- Record: 10–19 (5–15 WAC)
- Head coach: Dan Nielson (5th season)
- Associate head coach: Adam Wardenburg (1st season)
- Assistant coaches: Michael Shreeve (2nd season); Xojian Harry (2nd season)
- Home arena: UCCU Center (Capacity: 8,500); Lockhart Arena (Capacity: 2,000)

2023–24 WAC women's basketball standings
	Conf.				Overall
Team	W		L	PCT	W		L	PCT
California Baptist †	18	–	2	.900	28	–	4	.875
Grand Canyon	16	–	4	.800	24	–	8	.750
Stephen F. Austin	14	–	6	.700	21	–	12	.636
Utah Tech*	12	–	8	.600	18	–	14	.563
UT Arlington	11	–	9	.550	17	–	16	.515
Abilene Christian	10	–	10	.500	14	–	16	.467
Tarleton State*	7	–	13	.350	12	–	20	.375
Seattle	6	–	14	.300	6	–	23	.207
Southern Utah	6	–	14	.300	8	–	22	.267
UT Rio Grande Valley	5	–	15	.250	6	–	23	.207
Utah Valley	5	–	15	.250	10	–	19	.345
† 2024 WAC tournament winner * Ineligible for the 2024 NCAA tournament due to transition from Division II

The 2023–24 Utah Valley Wolverines women's basketball team represented Utah Valley University in the 2023–24 NCAA Division I women's basketball season. Dan Nielson entered the season as head coach for his fifth season. The Wolverines played their home games at the UCCU Center and Lockhart Arena in Orem, Utah as members of the Western Athletic Conference (WAC).

The Wolverines finished the season 10–19, 5–15 in WAC play, to finish tied for tenth place. As only the top eight teams were invited to the 2024 WAC tournament, the Wolverines failed to qualify for it.

== Previous season ==
The Wolverines finished the 2022–23 season 6–24, 3–15 in WAC play, to finish in twelfth place. In the 2023 WAC women's basketball tournament, they lost to Utah Tech in the first round.

== Offseason ==
=== Departures ===
Name	Position	Height	Year	Reason for departure
Jaeden Brown	F	6' 1"	Sophomore	Transferred to Southern Utah
Shay Fano	F	6' 0"	Junior	Transferred to Grand Canyon
Kayla Anderson	F	5' 7"	Senior	Graduated
Mae Afoa	F	6' 1"	Freshman	Transferred to USC Upstate

=== Incoming transfers ===
Name	Position	Height	Year	Previous school
Amanda Barcello	G/F	5' 11"	Sophomore	BYU
Jenna Dick	G	5' 8"	Senior	Tarleton
Liana Kaitu'u	F	6' 0"	Senior	Portland

== Roster ==
2023–24 Utah Valley Wolverines women's basketball team
Players
Coaches

Pos.	#	Name	Height	Year	Previous school	Hometown
G	1	Kylee Mabry	5 ft 11 in (1.8 m)	So	Davis High School	Kaysville, UT
F	2	Elina Tausinga	5 ft 10 in (1.78 m)	Jr	East High School	Salt Lake City, UT
G/F	3	Amanda Barcello	5 ft 11 in (1.8 m)	RS So	Seton Catholic High School BYU	Chandler, AZ
G	4	Abby Hendricks	5 ft 6 in (1.68 m)	RS Fr	La Costa Canyon High School	Carlsbad, CA
G	5	Jenna Dick	5 ft 8 in (1.73 m)	Sr	Brookswood Secondary Tarleton	Langley, BC
G	8	Noga Haran	5 ft 9 in (1.75 m)	Fr	Emek Harod High School	Modi'in, Israel
G	10	Saige Gibb	5 ft 10 in (1.78 m)	RS So	Timpview High School	Raymond, AB
G	12	Eleyana Tafisi	5 ft 6 in (1.68 m)	Jr	Copper Hills High School	West Jordan, UT
G	13	Ally Criddle	5 ft 8 in (1.73 m)	Jr	Skyridge High School	Lehi, UT
G	14	Abby Conlee	6 ft 0 in (1.83 m)	Jr	Lone Peak High School	Alpine, UT
G	21	Tahlia White	6 ft 0 in (1.83 m)	RS Jr	Mountain View High School; BYU	Orem, UT
F	23	Liana Kiatu'u	6 ft 0 in (1.83 m)	RS Sr	East High School Portland	Salt Lake City, UT
G	24	Kaylee Byon	5 ft 7 in (1.7 m)	So	Rosary Academy	Buena Park, CA
G/F	25	Halle Nelson	6 ft 1 in (1.85 m)	RS So	American Fork High School Utah State	American Fork, UT
C	34	Tessa Chaney	6 ft 3 in (1.91 m)	So	Westlake High School	Saratoga Springs, UT

Head coach

- Dan Nielson (BYU)

Assistant coach(es)

- Adam Wardenburg (Utah State)
- Michael Shreeve (BYU)
- Xojian Harry (BYU)

Legend

- (C) Team captain
- (S) Suspended
- (I) Ineligible
- (W) Walk-on
- Injured
- Current redshirt

Roster
Last update: August 7, 2024

== Schedule and results ==
Date time, TV	Rank^{#}	Opponent^{#}	Result	Record	Site (attendance) city, state
Regular season
November 6, 2023*; 7:30 p.m., ESPN+		Weber State	W 56–55	1–0	UCCU Center (2,548); Orem, UT
November 14, 2023*; 7:00 p.m., ESPN+		at BYU; UCCU Crosstown Clash	L 44–59	1–1	Marriott Center (1,690); Provo, UT
November 18, 2023*; 1:30 p.m.		at St. Thomas	L 62–70	1–2	Schoenecker Arena (315); Saint Paul, MN
November 21, 2023*; 6:00 p.m., ESPN+		Westminster	W 76–42	2–2	UCCU Center (346); Orem, UT
November 25, 2023*; 2:00 p.m., ESPN+		at Idaho	W 66–59	3–2	ICCU Arena (1,057); Moscow, ID
November 29, 2023; 7:00 p.m., ESPN+		at Seattle	L 48–58	3–3 (0–1)	Redhawk Center (302); Seattle, WA
December 2, 2023; 2:00 p.m., ESPN+		Utah Tech; Old Hammer Rivalry	L 59–73	3–4 (0–2)	UCCU Center (615); Orem, UT
December 6, 2023*; 7:00 p.m., ESPN+		at Idaho State	L 50–54	3–5 (0–2)	Reed Gym (843); Pocatello, ID
December 9, 2023*; 2:00 p.m., ESPN+		Utah State	W 68–38	4–5 (0–2)	UCCU Center (472); Orem, UT
December 16, 2023*; 2:00 p.m., ESPN+		at New Mexico State; C-USA/WAC	L 39–70	4–6 (0–2)	Pan American Center (351); Las Cruces, NM
December 21, 2023*; 2:00 p.m., ESPN+		Sam Houston; C-USA/WAC	W 73–69 ^{OT}	5–6 (0–2)	UCCU Center (304); Orem, UT
January 4, 2024; 7:00 p.m., ESPN+		at California Baptist	L 61–80	5–7 (0–3)	Fowler Events Center (454); Riverside, CA
January 6, 2024; 5:00 p.m., ESPN+		at Southern Utah	L 58–71	5–8 (0–4)	America First Event Center (493); Cedar City, UT
January 11, 2024; 6:00 p.m., ESPN+		UT Arlington	L 64–72	5–9 (0–5)	UCCU Center (519); Orem, UT
January 13, 2024; 2:00 p.m., ESPN+		UT Rio Grande Valley	W 75–62	6–9 (1–5)	UCCU Center (411); Orem, UT
January 18, 2024; 6:00 p.m., ESPN+		Grand Canyon	L 68–78	6–10 (1–6)	UCCU Center (1,183); Orem, UT
January 20, 2024; 2:00 p.m., ESPN+		at Utah Tech; Old Hammer Rivalry	W 55–52	7–10 (2–6)	Burns Arena (668); St. George, UT
January 27, 2024; 2:00 p.m., ESPN+		Seattle	W 59–56	8–10 (3–6)	UCCU Center (567); Orem, UT
February 1, 2024; 6:00 p.m., ESPN+		Stephen F. Austin	L 63–72	8–11 (3–7)	Lockhart Arena (521); Orem, UT
February 3, 2024; 3:00 p.m., ESPN+		at Grand Canyon	L 52–66	8–12 (3–8)	GCU Arena (2,207); Phoenix, AZ
February 8, 2024; 6:00 p.m., ESPN+		at Tarleton	L 55–60	8–13 (3–9)	Wisdom Gymnasium (747); Stephenville, TX
February 10, 2024; 12:00 p.m., ESPN+		at Abilene Christian	L 53–66	8–14 (3–10)	Moody Coliseum (1,056); Abilene, TX
February 15, 2024; 6:00 p.m., ESPN+		California Baptist	W 92–89 ^{OT}	9–14 (4–10)	Lockhart Arena (407); Orem, UT
February 17, 2024; 2:00 p.m., ESPN+		Southern Utah	L 66–67 ^{2OT}	9–15 (4–11)	Lockhart Arena (689); Orem, UT
February 22, 2024; 5:30 p.m., ESPN+		at UT Rio Grande Valley	L 62–63	9–16 (4–12)	UTRGV Fieldhouse (777); Edinburg, TX
February 24, 2024; 1:00 p.m., ESPN+		at Stephen F. Austin	L 35–84	9–17 (4–13)	William R. Johnson Coliseum (1,232); Nacogdoches, TX
March 2, 2024; 1:00 p.m., ESPN+		at UT Arlington	L 53–67	9–18 (4–14)	College Park Center (1,012); Arlington, TX
March 7, 2024; 6:00 p.m., ESPN+		Tarleton	W 73–66	10–18 (5–14)	UCCU Center (699); Orem, UT
March 9, 2024; 2:00 p.m., ESPN+		Abilene Christian	L 50–81	10–19 (5–15)	UCCU Center (571); Orem, UT
*Non-conference game. ^{#}Rankings from AP poll. (#) Tournament seedings in parentheses.

== See also ==
- 2023–24 Utah Valley Wolverines men's basketball team
