= 2023–24 Southern Utah Thunderbirds women's basketball team =

American college basketball season

2023–24 Southern Utah Thunderbirds women's basketball
- Conference: Western Athletic Conference
- Record: 8–22 (6–14 WAC)
- Head coach: Tracy Mason (6th season)
- Associate head coach: Allyson Fasnacht
- Assistant coaches: Jay Johnson; Hailey Mandelko-Ferry
- Home arena: America First Event Center

2023–24 WAC women's basketball standings
	Conf.				Overall
Team	W		L	PCT	W		L	PCT
California Baptist †	18	–	2	.900	28	–	4	.875
Grand Canyon	16	–	4	.800	24	–	8	.750
Stephen F. Austin	14	–	6	.700	21	–	12	.636
Utah Tech*	12	–	8	.600	18	–	14	.563
UT Arlington	11	–	9	.550	17	–	16	.515
Abilene Christian	10	–	10	.500	14	–	16	.467
Tarleton State*	7	–	13	.350	12	–	20	.375
Seattle	6	–	14	.300	6	–	23	.207
Southern Utah	6	–	14	.300	8	–	22	.267
UT Rio Grande Valley	5	–	15	.250	6	–	23	.207
Utah Valley	5	–	15	.250	10	–	19	.345
† 2024 WAC tournament winner * Ineligible for the 2024 NCAA tournament due to transition from Division II

The 2023–24 Southern Utah Thunderbirds women's basketball team represented Southern Utah University during the 2023–24 NCAA Division I women's basketball season. The Thunderbirds, who were led by sixth-year head coach Tracy Mason, played their home games at America First Event Center in Cedar City, Utah as members of the Western Athletic Conference (WAC).

The Thunderbirds finished the season 8–22, 6–14 in WAC play, to finish in a tie for eighth place. They were defeated by UT Arlington in the first round of the WAC tournament.

== Previous season ==
The Thunderbirds finished the 2022–23 season 23–10, 16–2 in WAC play, to finish as WAC regular-season champions. They defeated New Mexico State, Grand Canyon and California Baptist in the WAC tournament to send themselves to their first NCAA tournament appearance in program history. They received the #14 seed in the Greenville 1 Region, where they fell to #3 region seed Notre Dame in the first round.

== Roster ==
2023–24 Southern Utah Thunderbirds women's basketball team
Players
Coaches

Pos.	#	Name	Height	Year	Previous school	Hometown
G	1	Alexa Lord	5 ft 9 in (1.75 m)	GS	Richfield High School	Richfield, UT
C	3	Megan Smith	6 ft 3 in (1.91 m)	GS	Utah Valley	Castle Dale, UT
G	4	Aishah Anis	5 ft 7 in (1.7 m)	Jr	Launceston Church Grammar School	Launceston, Australia
G	5	Charli Kay	5 ft 9 in (1.75 m)	Fr	Marist Regional College	Smithton, Australia
G	10	Maria Garcia	5 ft 8 in (1.73 m)	Fr	FC Barcelona Bàsquet	Barcelona, Spain
C	13	Ashley Banks	6 ft 5 in (1.96 m)	So	Boise High School	Boise, ID
G	22	Daylani Ballena	5 ft 8 in (1.73 m)	Sr	Kentridge High School	Kent, WA
G	23	Shiho Isono	5 ft 6 in (1.68 m)	Jr	Western Nebraska	Fukuoka, Japan
F	24	Jaeden Brown	6 ft 1 in (1.85 m)	Jr	Utah Valley	Draper, UT
G	30	Alexandra Eldredge	5 ft 10 in (1.78 m)	Fr	Worcester Academy	McLean, VA
G	34	Samantha Johnston	6 ft 0 in (1.83 m)	Sr	Cedar High School	Cedar City, UT
F	44	Ava Uhrich	6 ft 0 in (1.83 m)	Fr	Pinewood School	Burlingame, CA

Head coach

- Tracy Mason (Saint Mary's)

Assistant coach(es)

- Allyson Fasnacht (Liberty)
- Jay Johnson (Saint Mary's)
- Hailey Mandelko-Ferry (Southern Utah)

Legend

- (C) Team captain
- (S) Suspended
- (I) Ineligible
- (W) Walk-on
- Injured
- Current redshirt

Roster
Last update: June 4, 2024

== Schedule and results ==
Date time, TV	Rank^{#}	Opponent^{#}	Result	Record	Site (attendance) city, state
Regular season
November 8, 2023*; 6:30 pm, ESPN+		Eastern Washington	L 77–86	0–1	America First Event Center (740); Cedar City, UT
November 10, 2023*; 6:30 pm, ESPN+		Western Kentucky; WAC/C-USA Challenge	L 62–76	0–2	America First Event Center (653); Cedar City, UT
November 15, 2023*; 6:30 pm, ESPN+		Alaska	W 72–58	1–2	America First Event Center (303); Cedar City, UT
November 19, 2023*; 3:00 pm, ESPN+		at UC Santa Barbara	L 61–71	1–3	The Thunderdome (381); Santa Barbara, CA
November 28, 2023; 6:30 pm, ESPN+		California Baptist	L 66–79	1–4 (0–1)	America First Event Center (445); Cedar City, UT
December 2, 2023; 2:00 pm, ESPN+		Seattle	W 83–56	2–4 (1–1)	America First Event Center (341); Cedar City, UT
December 5, 2023*; 5:30 pm, ESPN+		at Texas A&M–Commerce	L 67–73	2–5	University Field House (345); Commerce, TX
December 7, 2023*; 7:00 pm, MW Network		at New Mexico	W 58–40	3–5	The Pit (4,526); Albuquerque, NM
December 16, 2023*; 5:00 pm, ESPN+		No. 11 Utah	L 60–96	3–6	America First Event Center (715); Cedar City, UT
December 21, 2023*; 2:00 pm, ESPN+		Northern Arizona	L 70–81	3–7	America First Event Center (452); Cedar City, UT
December 30, 2023*; 2:00 pm, ESPN+		at UTEP	L 62–89	3–8	Don Haskins Center (1,307); El Paso, TX
January 4, 2024; 6:00 pm, ESPN+		at Grand Canyon	L 60–78	3–9 (1–2)	Global Credit Union Arena (467); Phoenix, AZ
January 6, 2024; 5:00 pm, ESPN+		Utah Valley	W 71–58	4–9 (2–2)	America First Event Center (493); Cedar City, UT
January 13, 2024; 1:00 pm, ESPN+		at Stephen F. Austin	L 53–68	4–10 (2–3)	William R. Johnson Coliseum (1,116); Nacogdoches, TX
January 18, 2024; 7:00 pm, ESPN+		at Utah Tech	L 71–78	4–11 (2–4)	Burns Arena (940); St. George, UT
January 20, 2024; 2:00 pm, ESPN+		at California Baptist	L 67–93	4–12 (2–5)	Fowler Events Center (478); Riverside, CA
January 25, 2024; 6:30 pm, ESPN+		Tarleton State	L 60–71	4–13 (2–6)	America First Event Center (1,145); Cedar City, UT
January 27, 2024; 2:00 pm, ESPN+		Abilene Christian	W 82–80	5–13 (3–6)	America First Event Center (345); Cedar City, UT
February 1, 2024; 5:00 pm, ESPN+		at UT Arlington	L 59–85	5–14 (3–7)	College Park Center (1,290); Arlington, TX
February 3, 2024; 1:00 pm, ESPN+		at UT Rio Grande Valley	W 68–65 ^{OT}	6–14 (4–7)	UTRGV Fieldhouse (546); Edinburg, TX
February 8, 2024; 6:30 pm, ESPN+		Utah Tech	L 77–87	6–15 (4–8)	America First Event Center (765); Cedar City, UT
February 10, 2024; 2:00 pm, ESPN+		Grand Canyon	L 61–77	6–16 (4–9)	America First Event Center (354); Cedar City, UT
February 15, 2024; 7:00 pm, ESPN+		at Seattle	L 71–75	6–17 (4–10)	Redhawk Center (294); Seattle, WA
February 17, 2024; 2:00 pm, ESPN+		at Utah Valley	W 67–66 ^{2OT}	7–17 (5–10)	UCCU Center (689); Orem, UT
February 21, 2024; 6:30 pm, ESPN+		UT Arlington	L 70–78	7–18 (5–11)	America First Event Center (417); Cedar City, UT
February 29, 2024; 5:00 pm, ESPN+		at Abilene Christian	L 42–75	7–19 (5–12)	Moody Coliseum (1,023); Abilene, TX
March 2, 2024; 1:00 pm, ESPN+		at Tarleton State	L 63–69	7–20 (5–13)	Wisdom Gym (1,111); Stephenville, TX
March 7, 2024; 6:30 pm, ESPN+		Stephen F. Austin	L 74–81	7–21 (5–14)	America First Event Center (480); Cedar City, UT
March 9, 2024; 2:00 pm, ESPN+		UT Rio Grande Valley	W 65–52	8–21 (6–14)	America First Event Center (485); Cedar City, UT
WAC tournament
March 13, 2024; 1:00 pm, ESPN+	(8)	vs. (5) UT Arlington; First round	L 53–67	8–22	Orleans Arena (–); Paradise, NV
*Non-conference game. ^{#}Rankings from AP poll. (#) Tournament seedings in parentheses. All times are in Mountain.
