= 2023–24 Grand Canyon Antelopes women's basketball team =

American college basketball season

2023–24 Grand Canyon Antelopes women's basketball
- Conference: Western Athletic Conference
- Record: 24–8 (16–4 WAC)
- Head coach: Molly Miller (4th season)
- Associate head coach: Jason Glover
- Assistant coaches: Buck Scheel; Laura Dinkins; Daejah Bernard
- Home arena: Global Credit Union Arena

2023–24 WAC women's basketball standings
| | Conf. | | | | Overall |
| Team | W | | L | PCT | W | | L | PCT |
|---|---|---|---|---|---|---|---|---|
| California Baptist † | 18 | – | 2 | .900 | 28 | – | 4 | .875 |
| Grand Canyon | 16 | – | 4 | .800 | 24 | – | 8 | .750 |
| Stephen F. Austin | 14 | – | 6 | .700 | 21 | – | 12 | .636 |
| Utah Tech* | 12 | – | 8 | .600 | 18 | – | 14 | .563 |
| UT Arlington | 11 | – | 9 | .550 | 17 | – | 16 | .515 |
| Abilene Christian | 10 | – | 10 | .500 | 14 | – | 16 | .467 |
| Tarleton State* | 7 | – | 13 | .350 | 12 | – | 20 | .375 |
| Seattle | 6 | – | 14 | .300 | 6 | – | 23 | .207 |
| Southern Utah | 6 | – | 14 | .300 | 8 | – | 22 | .267 |
| UT Rio Grande Valley | 5 | – | 15 | .250 | 6 | – | 23 | .207 |
| Utah Valley | 5 | – | 15 | .250 | 10 | – | 19 | .345 |
† 2024 WAC tournament winner * Ineligible for the 2024 NCAA tournament due to transition from Division II

The 2023–24 Grand Canyon Antelopes women's basketball team represented Grand Canyon University during the 2023–24 NCAA Division I women's basketball season. The Antelopes, who were led by fourth-year head coach Molly Miller, played their home games at Global Credit Union Arena in Phoenix, Arizona as members of the Western Athletic Conference.

== Previous season ==
The Antelopes finished the 2022–23 season 21–10, 12–6 in WAC play to finish in fourth place. They defeated Seattle in the quarterfinals of the WAC tournament, before falling to eventual tournament champions Southern Utah in the semifinals.

== Roster ==
2023–24 Grand Canyon Antelopes women's basketball team
Players
Coaches

| Pos. | # | Name | Height | Year | Previous school | Hometown |
|---|---|---|---|---|---|---|
| G | 0 | Callie Cooper | 5 ft 6 in (1.68 m) | Jr | UC Santa Barbara | Richardson, Texas |
| G | 1 | Kristyna Jeskeova | 6 ft 2 in (1.88 m) | Sr | Long Beach State | Jablonec nad Nisou, Czech Republic |
| G | 2 | Asha Sra | 5 ft 7 in (1.7 m) | RS Fr | Clovis North High School | Fresno, California |
| G | 4 | Jada Holland | 5 ft 6 in (1.68 m) | Sr | San Jose State | Pleasanton, California |
| F | 5 | Shay Fano | 6 ft 0 in (1.83 m) | GS | Utah Valley | Spanish Fork, Utah |
| G | 10 | Sydney Palma | 5 ft 8 in (1.73 m) | GS | California Baptist | Anthem, Arizona |
| F | 11 | Olivia Lane | 6 ft 2 in (1.88 m) | Sr | North Dakota | Pequot Lakes, Minnesota |
| G | 14 | Anna Ostlie | 5 ft 8 in (1.73 m) | Sr | Boise State | Scottsdale, Arizona |
| G | 15 | McKenna Simons | 5 ft 10 in (1.78 m) | RS So | Blue Valley North High School | Overland Park, Kansas |
| F | 20 | Laura Erikstrup | 6 ft 2 in (1.88 m) | GS | San Diego | Portland, Oregon |
| G | 23 | Trinity San Antonio | 5 ft 10 in (1.78 m) | Jr | California Baptist | Moreno Valley, California |
| G/F | 24 | Tiarra Brown | 5 ft 9 in (1.75 m) | Sr | Bethel High School | Spanaway, Washington |
| G | 32 | Sydney Erikstrup | 6 ft 1 in (1.85 m) | GS | Arizona State | Portland, Oregon |
| G | 34 | Naudia Evans | 5 ft 6 in (1.68 m) | Jr | Waynesville High School | Waynesville, Missouri |

Head coach

- Molly Miller (Drury)

Assistant coach(es)

- Jason Glover (Grand Canyon)
- Buck Scheel (Waldorf)
- Laura Dinkins (Northern Arizona)
- Daejah Bernard (Drury)

Legend

- (C) Team captain
- (S) Suspended
- (I) Ineligible
- (W) Walk-on
- Injured
- Current redshirt

Roster
Last update: May 31, 2024

== Schedule and results ==
| Date time, TV | Rank^{#} | Opponent^{#} | Result | Record | Site (attendance) city, state |
Exhibition
| October 30, 2023*; 6:00 pm | | Benedictine (AZ) | W 90–40 | – | Global Credit Union Arena (623); Phoenix, AZ |
Regular season
| November 6, 2023*; 4:00 pm, ESPN+ | | Saint Mary's | W 55–52 | 1–0 | Global Credit Union Arena (1,557); Phoenix, AZ |
| November 11, 2023*; 6:00 pm, MidcoSN2/SLN | | at North Dakota | W 73–61 | 2–0 | Betty Engelstad Sioux Center (1,423); Grand Forks, ND |
| November 16, 2023*; 7:00 pm, ESPN+ | | Oregon | L 56–64 | 2–1 | Global Credit Union Arena (2,136); Phoenix, AZ |
| November 20, 2023*; 6:00 pm, ESPN+ | | Montana | L 71–76 | 2–2 | Global Credit Union Arena (523); Phoenix, AZ |
| November 24, 2023*; 2:30 pm, ESPN+ | | Fresno State; GCU Classic | W 55–36 | 3–2 | Global Credit Union Arena (513); Phoenix, AZ |
| November 25, 2023*; 2:30 pm, ESPN+ | | Nicholls; GCU Classic | W 63–40 | 4–2 | Global Credit Union Arena (502); Phoenix, AZ |
| November 29, 2023; 7:00 pm, ESPN+ | | UT Rio Grande Valley | W 63–50 | 5–2 (1–0) | Global Credit Union Arena (1,000); Phoenix, AZ |
| December 2, 2023; 1:00 pm, ESPN+ | | at UT Arlington | W 77–48 | 6–2 (2–0) | College Park Center (828); Arlington, TX |
| December 8, 2023*; 1:00 pm | | at Arizona State | W 66–59 | 7–2 | Desert Financial Arena (2,104); Tempe, AZ |
| December 17, 2023*; 3:00 pm, ESPN+ | | at Idaho | W 65–63 ^{OT} | 8–2 | ICCU Arena (1,034); Moscow, ID |
| December 20, 2023*; 12:00 pm, ESPN+ | | at Liberty | L 52–65 | 8–3 | Liberty Arena (697); Lynchburg, VA |
| December 27, 2023*; 6:00 pm, ESPN+ | | Arizona Christian | W 115–41 | 9–3 | Global Credit Union Arena (462); Phoenix, AZ |
| December 30, 2023*; 2:00 pm, ESPN+ | | Middle Tennessee | W 68–59 | 10–3 | Global Credit Union Arena (623); Phoenix, AZ |
| January 4, 2024; 6:00 pm, ESPN+ | | Southern Utah | W 78–60 | 11–3 (3–0) | Global Credit Union Arena (467); Phoenix, AZ |
| January 6, 2024; 2:00 pm, ESPN+ | | Utah Tech | W 73–48 | 12–3 (4–0) | Global Credit Union Arena (687); Phoenix, AZ |
| January 11, 2024; 5:00 pm, ESPN+ | | at Abilene Christian | W 64–55 | 13–3 (5–0) | Moody Coliseum (923); Abilene, TX |
| January 13, 2024; 1:00 pm, ESPN+ | | at Tarleton State | W 79–47 | 14–3 (6–0) | Wisdom Gym (710); Stephenville, TX |
| January 18, 2024; 6:00 pm, ESPN+ | | at Utah Valley | W 78–68 | 15–3 (7–0) | UCCU Center (1,183); Orem, UT |
| January 20, 2024; 2:00 pm, ESPN+ | | Seattle | W 84–73 ^{2OT} | 16–3 (8–0) | Global Credit Union Arena (602); Phoenix, AZ |
| January 25, 2024; 6:00 pm, ESPN+ | | Stephen F. Austin | L 54–59 | 16–4 (8–1) | Global Credit Union Arena (568); Phoenix, AZ |
| January 27, 2024; 2:00 pm, ESPN+ | | UT Arlington | W 70–35 | 17–4 (9–1) | Global Credit Union Arena (553); Phoenix, AZ |
| February 1, 2024; 7:00 pm, ESPN+ | | at Seattle | W 53–40 | 18–4 (10–1) | Redhawk Center (262); Seattle, WA |
| February 3, 2024; 2:00 pm, Fox 10 Xtra/ESPN+ | | Utah Valley | W 66–52 | 19–4 (11–1) | Global Credit Union Arena (2,207); Phoenix, AZ |
| February 10, 2024; 2:00 pm, ESPN+ | | at Southern Utah | W 77–61 | 20–4 (12–1) | America First Event Center (354); Cedar City, UT |
| February 15, 2024; 7:00 pm, ESPN+ | | at Utah Tech | W 88–41 | 21–4 (13–1) | Burns Arena (522); St. George, UT |
| February 17, 2024; 2:00 pm, ESPN+ | | at California Baptist | L 65–71 | 21–5 (13–2) | Fowler Events Center (687); Riverside, CA |
| February 22, 2024; 6:00 pm, ESPN+ | | Tarleton State | W 62–43 | 22–5 (14–2) | Global Credit Union Arena (578); Phoenix, AZ |
| February 24, 2024; 2:00 pm, ESPN+ | | Abilene Christian | W 66–55 | 23–5 (15–2) | Global Credit Union Arena (537); Phoenix, AZ |
| February 29, 2024; 5:30 pm, ESPN+ | | at UT Rio Grande Valley | W 66–40 | 24–5 (16–2) | UTRGV Fieldhouse (625); Edinburg, TX |
| March 2, 2024; 1:00 pm, ESPN+ | | at Stephen F. Austin | L 77–85 | 24–6 (16–3) | William R. Johnson Coliseum (1,328); Nacogdoches, TX |
| March 9, 2024; 2:00 pm, ESPN+ | | California Baptist | L 81–85 ^{OT} | 24–7 (16–4) | Global Credit Union Arena (1,436); Phoenix, AZ |
WAC tournament
| March 15, 2024; 2:30 pm, ESPN+ | (2) | vs. (3) Stephen F. Austin; Semifinals | L 63–66 | 24–8 | Orleans Arena (1,343); Paradise, NV |
*Non-conference game. ^{#}Rankings from AP Poll. (#) Tournament seedings in parentheses. All times are in Mountain.
