= 2023–24 UT Arlington Mavericks women's basketball team =

American college basketball season

2023–24 UT Arlington Mavericks women's basketball
- Conference: Western Athletic Conference
- Record: 17–16 (11–9 WAC)
- Head coach: Shereka Wright (4th season)
- Assistant coaches: David Pierre Jr.; Rosalyn Tindel; KaeLynn Boyd
- Home arena: College Park Center

2023–24 WAC women's basketball standings
	Conf.				Overall
Team	W		L	PCT	W		L	PCT
California Baptist †	18	–	2	.900	28	–	4	.875
Grand Canyon	16	–	4	.800	24	–	8	.750
Stephen F. Austin	14	–	6	.700	21	–	12	.636
Utah Tech*	12	–	8	.600	18	–	14	.563
UT Arlington	11	–	9	.550	17	–	16	.515
Abilene Christian	10	–	10	.500	14	–	16	.467
Tarleton State*	7	–	13	.350	12	–	20	.375
Seattle	6	–	14	.300	6	–	23	.207
Southern Utah	6	–	14	.300	8	–	22	.267
UT Rio Grande Valley	5	–	15	.250	6	–	23	.207
Utah Valley	5	–	15	.250	10	–	19	.345
† 2024 WAC tournament winner * Ineligible for the 2024 NCAA tournament due to transition from Division II

The 2023–24 UT Arlington Mavericks women's basketball team represented the University of Texas at Arlington during the 2023–24 NCAA Division I women's basketball season. The Mavericks, who were led by fourth-year head coach Shereka Wright, played their home games at College Park Center in Arlington, Texas as members of the Western Athletic Conference (WAC).

The Mavericks finished the season 17–16, 11–9 in WAC play, to finish in fifth place. They defeated Southern Utah and Utah Tech, before falling to top-seeded and eventual tournament champions California Baptist in the semifinals of the WAC tournament.

== Previous season ==
The Mavericks finished the 2022–23 season 14–17, 8–10 in WAC play to finish in a tie for eighth place. They were upset by Seattle in the first round of the WAC tournament.

== Roster ==
2023–24 UT Arlington Mavericks women's basketball team
Players
Coaches

Pos.	#	Name	Height	Year	Previous school	Hometown
G	0	Kali Haizlip	5 ft 9 in (1.75 m)	So	College of Southern Idaho	Puyallup, WA
G	5	Nya Threatt	5 ft 6 in (1.68 m)	So	Dulles High School	Missouri City, TX
F	11	Cassidee Kinslow	6 ft 0 in (1.83 m)	Jr	Huntington Beach High School	Huntington Beach, CA
F	12	Avery Brittingham	6 ft 1 in (1.85 m)	Sr	Stephen F. Austin	Fort Worth, TX
G	14	Aubrey Reid	5 ft 11 in (1.8 m)	Fr	Austin High School	Austin, TX
G	21	Alexsyah Goudeau	5 ft 10 in (1.78 m)	So	Tahlequah High School	Tahlequah, OK
G	23	Taliyah Clark	5 ft 11 in (1.8 m)	Jr	Seattle	Lynnwood, WA
F	24	Miraya Perkins	5 ft 11 in (1.8 m)	Fr	Boswell High School	Dallas, TX
F	31	Adéla Válková	6 ft 2 in (1.88 m)	Sr	UTEP	Šumperk, Czech Republic
F	32	Jamaya Perry	6 ft 1 in (1.85 m)	Fr	St. Mary's High School	Stockton, CA
C	34	DJ McFarlane	6 ft 3 in (1.91 m)	Sr	Tennessee Tech	Glenn Dale, MD

Head coach

- Shereka Wright (Purdue)

Assistant coach(es)

- David Pierre Jr. (Grambling State)
- Rosalyn Tindel (Midwestern State)
- KaeLynn Boyd (Southeastern Louisiana)

Legend

- (C) Team captain
- (S) Suspended
- (I) Ineligible
- (W) Walk-on
- Injured
- Current redshirt

Roster
Last update: June 2, 2024

== Schedule and results ==
Date time, TV	Rank^{#}	Opponent^{#}	Result	Record	Site (attendance) city, state
Regular season
November 6, 2023*; 6:00 p.m., ESPN+		at South Florida	L 61–76	0–1	Yuengling Center (2,033); Tampa, FL
November 10, 2023*; 5:00 p.m., ESPN+		Lamar	L 57–74	0–2	College Park Center (1,490); Arlington, TX
November 14, 2023*; 7:00 p.m., LHN		at No. 11 Texas	L 64–110	0–3	Moody Center (5,016); Austin, TX
November 18, 2023*; 2:00 p.m., ESPN+		UTSA	L 66–70	0–4	College Park Center (832); Arlington, TX
November 24, 2023*; 6:00 p.m.		vs. Illinois State; Saint Mary's Thanksgiving Classic	L 63–87	0–5	University Credit Union Pavilion (89); Moraga, CA
November 25, 2023*; 3:00 p.m.		vs. North Carolina A&T; Saint Mary's Thanksgiving Classic	W 87–76	1–5	University Credit Union Pavilion (76); Moraga, CA
November 29, 2023; 6:00 p.m., ESPN+		at Abilene Christian	L 76–94	1–6 (0–1)	Moody Coliseum (1,006); Abilene, TX
December 2, 2023; 2:00 p.m., ESPN+		Grand Canyon	L 48–77	1–7 (0–2)	College Park Center (828); Arlington, TX
December 5, 2023*; 12:00 p.m.		at No. 8 Colorado	L 74–95	1–8	CU Events Center (2,673); Boulder, CO
December 16, 2023*; 2:00 p.m., ESPN+		at Sam Houston	W 76–65	2–8	Bernard Johnson Coliseum (407); Huntsville, TX
December 19, 2023*; 6:30 p.m., ESPN+		at Jacksonville State	W 69–64	3–8	Pete Mathews Coliseum (912); Jacksonville, AL
December 30, 2023*; 2:00 p.m., ESPN+		New Mexico State	W 61–60	4–8	College Park Center (976); Arlington, TX
January 4, 2024; 6:00 p.m., ESPN+		Tarleton State	W 73–49	5–8 (1–2)	College Park Center (952); Arlington, TX
January 6, 2024; 2:00 p.m., ESPN+		Stephen F. Austin	W 81–62	6–8 (2–2)	College Park Center (899); Arlington, TX
January 11, 2024; 7:00 p.m., ESPN+		at Utah Valley	W 72–64	7–8 (3–2)	UCCU Center (519); Orem, UT
January 13, 2024; 3:00 p.m., ESPN+		at Seattle	W 72–54	8–8 (4–2)	Redhawk Center (383); Seattle, WA
January 18, 2024; 6:30 p.m., ESPN+		at UT Rio Grande Valley	L 62–64	8–9 (4–3)	UTRGV Fieldhouse (1,077); Edinburg, TX
January 20, 2024; 2:00 p.m., ESPN+		Abilene Christian	W 74–65	9–9 (5–3)	College Park Center (859); Arlington, TX
January 27, 2024; 3:00 p.m., ESPN+		at Grand Canyon	L 35–70	9–10 (5–4)	Global Credit Union Arena (553); Phoenix, AZ
February 1, 2024; 6:00 p.m., ESPN+		Southern Utah	W 85–59	10–10 (6–4)	College Park Center (1,290); Arlington, TX
February 3, 2024; 2:30 p.m., ESPN+		Utah Tech	L 60–72	10–11 (6–5)	College Park Center (1,246); Arlington, TX
February 8, 2024; 6:00 p.m., ESPN+		California Baptist	L 92–94	10–12 (6–6)	College Park Center (1,473); Arlington, TX
February 10, 2024; 2:00 p.m., ESPN+		at Stephen F. Austin	W 84–74	11–12 (7–6)	William R. Johnson Coliseum (1,682); Nacogdoches, TX
February 15, 2024; 7:00 p.m., ESPN+		at Tarleton State	W 71–58	12–12 (8–6)	Wisdom Gym (670); Stephenville, TX
February 17, 2024; 2:00 p.m., ESPN+		UT Rio Grande Valley	W 71–55	13–12 (9–6)	College Park Center (1,157); Arlington, TX
February 21, 2024; 7:30 p.m., ESPN+		at Southern Utah	W 78–70	14–12 (10–6)	America First Event Center (417); Cedar City, UT
February 24, 2024; 2:00 p.m., ESPN+		at Utah Tech	L 69–88	14–13 (10–7)	Burns Arena (612); St. George, UT
February 29, 2024; 6:00 p.m., ESPN+		Seattle	L 77–81	14–14 (10–8)	College Park Center (1,025); Arlington, TX
March 2, 2024; 2:00 p.m., ESPN+		Utah Valley	W 67–53	15–14 (11–8)	College Park Center (1,012); Arlington, TX
March 7, 2024; 8:00 p.m., ESPN+		at California Baptist	L 75–91	15–15 (11–9)	Fowler Events Center (1,157); Riverside, CA
WAC tournament
March 13, 2024; 2:00 p.m., ESPN+	(5)	vs. (8) Southern Utah; First round	W 67–53	16–15	Orleans Arena (–); Paradise, NV
March 14, 2024; 2:00 p.m., ESPN+	(5)	vs. (4) Utah Tech; Quarterfinals	W 72–57	17–15	Orleans Arena (–); Paradise, NV
March 15, 2024; 2:00 p.m., ESPN+	(5)	vs. (1) California Baptist; Semifinals	L 67–83	17–16	Orleans Arena (–); Paradise, NV
*Non-conference game. ^{#}Rankings from AP poll. (#) Tournament seedings in parentheses. All times are in Central.
