= 2023–24 Tarleton State Texans women's basketball team =

American college basketball season

2023–24 Tarleton State Texans women's basketball
- Conference: Western Athletic Conference
- Record: 11–20 (7–13 WAC)
- Head coach: Bill Brock (1st season)
- Assistant coaches: Geoff Golden; Monique Whaley-Briggs
- Home arena: Wisdom Gym

2023–24 WAC women's basketball standings
	Conf.				Overall
Team	W		L	PCT	W		L	PCT
California Baptist †	18	–	2	.900	28	–	4	.875
Grand Canyon	16	–	4	.800	24	–	8	.750
Stephen F. Austin	14	–	6	.700	21	–	12	.636
Utah Tech*	12	–	8	.600	18	–	14	.563
UT Arlington	11	–	9	.550	17	–	16	.515
Abilene Christian	10	–	10	.500	14	–	16	.467
Tarleton State*	7	–	13	.350	12	–	20	.375
Seattle	6	–	14	.300	6	–	23	.207
Southern Utah	6	–	14	.300	8	–	22	.267
UT Rio Grande Valley	5	–	15	.250	6	–	23	.207
Utah Valley	5	–	15	.250	10	–	19	.345
† 2024 WAC tournament winner * Ineligible for the 2024 NCAA tournament due to transition from Division II

The 2023–24 Tarleton State Texans women's basketball team represented Tarleton State University during the 2023–24 NCAA Division I women's basketball season. The Texans, who were led by first-year head coach Bill Brock, played their home games at the Wisdom Gym in Stephenville, Texas, as members of the Western Athletic Conference (WAC).

This season marked Tarleton State's final year of a four-year transition period from Division II to Division I. As a result, the Texans were not eligible to play in the NCAA tournament, but were eligible to play in the WAC tournament.

The Texans finished the 2023–24 season 11–20, 7–13 in WAC play, to finish in a tie for seventh place. In the WAC tournament, they defeated Abilene Christian in the first round before falling to Stephen F. Austin in the quarterfinals.

== Previous season ==
The Texans finished the 2022–23 season 8–21, 2–16 in WAC play, to finish in 13th (last) place. Due to the WAC's new resume seeding ranking, which is an advanced analytic developed by Ken Pomeroy that incorporated the performance of teams in both conference and non-conference games, they failed to qualify for the WAC tournament, as only the top 12 teams qualify.

On March 2, 2023, it was announced that the school would be parting ways with head coach Misty Wilson, ending her nine-year tenure. On March 14, the school announced that longtime Baylor assistant coach Bill Brock would be named the Texans' new head coach.

== Roster ==
2023–24 Tarleton State Texans women's basketball team
Players
Coaches

Pos.	#	Name	Height	Year	Previous school	Hometown
F	1	Andjela Bigovic	6 ft 5 in (1.96 m)	So	Cochise College	Herceg Novi, Montenegro
F	2	Anya McKenzie	6 ft 2 in (1.88 m)	Fr	Ipswich Basketball Club	Luton, England
G	4	Teresa Da Silva	5 ft 8 in (1.73 m)	Sr	Arizona Western College	London, England
G	5	Nykesha Sanders	5 ft 7 in (1.7 m)	Jr	Paris Junior College	Detroit, MI
G	10	Miannah Little	5 ft 6 in (1.68 m)	Jr	McLennan Community College	Waco, TX
G	11	Jakoriah Long	5 ft 7 in (1.7 m)	Jr	Blinn College	Waco, TX
C	13	Vitória Carvalho	6 ft 3 in (1.91 m)	Jr	South Plains College	Rio de Janeiro, Brazil
G	14	Teresa Maggio	5 ft 6 in (1.68 m)	RS Fr	IUPUI	Lafayette, IN
G	15	Karyn Sanford	6 ft 0 in (1.83 m)	So	Albany	Bergen, Norway
G	22	Tyler Jackson	5 ft 9 in (1.75 m)	Jr	Louisiana Tech	Allen, TX
F	23	Lexi Bull	6 ft 0 in (1.83 m)	Jr	Wyoming	Pocatello, ID
F	24	Elise Turrubiates	5 ft 0 in (1.52 m)	Jr	Frank Phillips College	Hobbs, NM
F	30	Dyamon Griggs	5 ft 11 in (1.8 m)	So	Midwestern State	Waco, TX
G	33	Malgorzata Byczkowska	5 ft 11 in (1.8 m)	So	Howard College	Gdynia, Poland
C	55	Faith Acker	6 ft 2 in (1.88 m)	Fr	Winnsboro High School	Winnsboro, TX

Head coach

- Bill Brock (SE Oklahoma State)

Assistant coach(es)

- Geoff Golden (Texas State)
- Monique Whaley-Briggs (NC Central)

Legend

- (C) Team captain
- (S) Suspended
- (I) Ineligible
- (W) Walk-on
- Injured
- Current redshirt

Roster
Last update: June 3, 2024

== Schedule and results ==
Date time, TV	Rank^{#}	Opponent^{#}	Result	Record	Site (attendance) city, state
Exhibition
October 25, 2023*; 6:00 p.m.		McMurry	W 71–33	–	Wisdom Gym (207); Stephenville, TX
October 30, 2023*; 6:00 p.m.		UNT Dallas	W 94–53	–	Wisdom Gym (450); Stephenville, TX
Regular season
November 6, 2023*; 7:00 p.m., ESPN+		Howard Payne	W 106–38	1–0	Wisdom Gym (1,036); Stephenville, TX
November 10, 2023*; 7:00 p.m., ESPN+		at Texas Tech	L 63–70	1–1	United Supermarkets Arena (4,514); Lubbock, TX
November 12, 2023*; 3:00 p.m., MW Network		at New Mexico	L 55–64	1–2	The Pit (4,626); Albuquerque, NM
November 16, 2023*; 6:30 p.m., ESPN+		at Northwestern State	Postponed		Prather Coliseum; Natchitoches, LA
November 22, 2023*; 7:00 p.m., ESPN+		Eastern Washington	L 62–64	1–3	Wisdom Gym (427); Stephenville, TX
November 29, 2023; 7:00 p.m., ESPN+		Stephen F. Austin	L 67–80	1–4 (0–1)	Wisdom Gym (857); Stephenville, TX
December 2, 2023; 2:00 p.m., ESPN+		at UT Rio Grande Valley	W 72–66	2–4 (1–1)	UTRGV Fieldhouse (358); Edinburg, TX
December 6, 2023*; 5:00 p.m., ESPN+		at Northwestern State; Rescheduled from November 16	L 51–59	2–5	Prather Coliseum (135); Natchitoches, LA
December 10, 2023*; 2:00 p.m., ESPN+		Incarnate Word	L 42–57	2–6	Wisdom Gym (419); Stephenville, TX
December 16, 2023*; 1:00 p.m., ESPN+		at McNeese	W 88–64	3–6	The Legacy Center (1,667); Lake Charles, LA
December 18, 2023*; 11:00 a.m., ESPN+		at New Orleans	L 59–67	3–7	Lakefront Arena (877); New Orleans, LA
December 30, 2023*; 2:00 p.m., YouTube		at Texas Southern	W 52–40	4–7	H&PE Arena (340); Houston, TX
January 4, 2024; 6:00 p.m., ESPN+		at UT Arlington	L 49–73	4–8 (1–2)	College Park Center (952); Arlington, TX
January 11, 2024; 7:00 p.m., ESPN+		California Baptist	L 59–89	4–9 (1–3)	Wisdom Gym (810); Stephenville, TX
January 13, 2024; 2:00 p.m., ESPN+		Grand Canyon	L 47–79	4–10 (1–4)	Wisdom Gym (710); Stephenville, TX
January 18, 2024; 6:00 p.m., ESPN+		at Abilene Christian	L 51–73	4–11 (1–5)	Moody Coliseum (1,125); Abilene, TX
January 20, 2024; 2:00 p.m., ESPN+		UT Rio Grande Valley	L 57–61	4–12 (1–6)	Wisdom Gym (490); Stephenville, TX
January 25, 2024; 7:30 p.m., ESPN+		at Southern Utah	W 71–60	5–12 (2–6)	America First Event Center (1,145); Cedar City, UT
January 27, 2024; 3:00 p.m., ESPN+		at Utah Tech	L 48–75	5–13 (2–7)	Burns Arena (441); St. George, UT
February 1, 2024; 7:00 p.m., ESPN+		Abilene Christian	W 74–66	6–13 (3–7)	Wisdom Gym (1,555); Stephenville, TX
February 3, 2024; 2:00 p.m., ESPN+		at Stephen F. Austin	L 62–73	6–14 (3–8)	William R. Johnson Coliseum (1,136); Nacogdoches, TX
February 8, 2024; 7:00 p.m., ESPN+		Utah Valley	W 60–55	7–14 (4–8)	Wisdom Gym (747); Stephenville, TX
February 10, 2024; 2:00 p.m., ESPN+		Seattle	L 57–61	7–15 (4–9)	Wisdom Gym (618); Stephenville, TX
February 15, 2024; 7:00 p.m., ESPN+		UT Arlington	L 58–71	7–16 (4–10)	Wisdom Gym (670); Stephenville, TX
February 22, 2024; 7:00 p.m., ESPN+		at Grand Canyon	L 43–62	7–17 (4–11)	Global Credit Union Arena (578); Phoenix, AZ
February 24, 2024; 3:00 p.m., ESPN+		at California Baptist	L 64–97	7–18 (4–12)	Fowler Events Center (401); Riverside, CA
February 29, 2024; 7:00 p.m., ESPN+		Utah Tech	W 76–60	8–18 (5–12)	Wisdom Gym (1,013); Stephenville, TX
March 2, 2024; 2:00 p.m., ESPN+		Southern Utah	W 69–63	9–18 (6–12)	Wisdom Gym (1,111); Stephenville, TX
March 7, 2024; 7:00 p.m., ESPN+		at Utah Valley	L 66–73	9–19 (6–13)	UCCU Center (699); Orem, UT
March 9, 2024; 3:00 p.m., ESPN+		at Seattle	W 62–57	10–19 (7–13)	Redhawk Center (701); Seattle, WA
WAC tournament
March 13, 2024; 4:30 p.m., ESPN+	(7)	vs. (6) Abilene Christian; First round	W 54–41	11–19	Orleans Arena (–); Paradise, NV
March 14, 2024; 4:30 p.m., ESPN+	(7)	vs. (3) Stephen F. Austin; Quarterfinals	L 58–70	11–20	Orleans Arena (–); Paradise, NV
*Non-conference game. ^{#}Rankings from AP poll. (#) Tournament seedings in parentheses. All times are in Central.
