= 2023–24 California Baptist Lancers women's basketball team =

American college basketball season

2023–24 California Baptist Lancers women's basketball
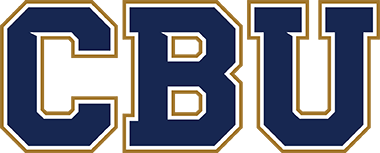

WAC regular-season and tournament champions

NCAA tournament, first round
- Conference: Western Athletic Conference
- Record: 28–4 (18–2 WAC)
- Head coach: Jarrod Olson (12th season)
- Associate head coach: Jessica Case
- Assistant coaches: Angie Ned; Brittany Chambers; Kamille Diaz; Steve Yang
- Home arena: Fowler Events Center

2023–24 WAC women's basketball standings
	Conf.				Overall
Team	W		L	PCT	W		L	PCT
California Baptist †	18	–	2	.900	28	–	4	.875
Grand Canyon	16	–	4	.800	24	–	8	.750
Stephen F. Austin	14	–	6	.700	21	–	12	.636
Utah Tech*	12	–	8	.600	18	–	14	.563
UT Arlington	11	–	9	.550	17	–	16	.515
Abilene Christian	10	–	10	.500	14	–	16	.467
Tarleton State*	7	–	13	.350	12	–	20	.375
Seattle	6	–	14	.300	6	–	23	.207
Southern Utah	6	–	14	.300	8	–	22	.267
UT Rio Grande Valley	5	–	15	.250	6	–	23	.207
Utah Valley	5	–	15	.250	10	–	19	.345
† 2024 WAC tournament winner * Ineligible for the 2024 NCAA tournament due to transition from Division II

The 2023–24 California Baptist Lancers women's basketball team represented California Baptist University during the 2023–24 NCAA Division I women's basketball season. The Lancers, led by twelfth-year head coach Jarrod Olson, played their home games at the Fowler Events Center in Riverside, California as members of the Western Athletic Conference (WAC).

The Lancers finished the season 28–4, 18–2 in WAC play, to finish as WAC regular-season champions. They defeated UT Arlington and Stephen F. Austin to win the WAC tournament championship, sending the Lancers to their first-ever NCAA tournament. In the NCAA tournament, they received the #15 seed in the Albany Regional 2, where they fell to #2 region seed UCLA in the first round.

== Previous season ==
The Lancers finished the 2022–23 season 22–13, 13–5 in WAC play, to finish in third place. As a No. 4 seed in the WAC tournament they defeated Utah Tech in the quarterfinals and Stephen F. Austin in the semifinals, before losing to Southern Utah in the championship game. They were invited to the WBI, where they defeated North Dakota, Georgia Southern and New Mexico State to win the WBI championship.

== Roster ==
2023–24 California Baptist Lancers women's basketball team
Players
Coaches

Pos.	#	Name	Height	Year	Previous school	Hometown
G	2	Chloe Webb	5 ft 8 in (1.73 m)	Sr	Mater Dei Catholic HS; UC Irvine	San Diego, CA
F	3	Kinsley Barrington	6 ft 0 in (1.83 m)	Sr	University HS; Southern Utah	Spokane, WA
G	4	Nhug Bosch Duran	5 ft 7 in (1.7 m)	Jr	INS Joan Coromines; Wichita State	Barcelona, Spain
G	5	Filipas Barros	5 ft 9 in (1.75 m)	So	Portuguese U20 National Team	Vermoim Maia, Portugal
G	5	Claudia Fiel	5 ft 6 in (1.68 m)	Fr	Celta Baloncesto de Vigo	Marín, Spain
G	12	Nae Nae Calhoun	5 ft 5 in (1.65 m)	Sr	John W. North HS; Hawaii	Riverside, CA
G	15	Anaiyah Tu'ua	5 ft 9 in (1.75 m)	RS Jr	Troy HS; Cal State Northridge	{{{home}}}
F	20	Emily Sewell	6 ft 3 in (1.91 m)	Jr	Centre of Excellence; Portland	Melbourne, Australia
G	22	Sydney White	5 ft 9 in (1.75 m)	Fr	Arapahoe HS	Centennial, CO
G	24	Khloe Lemon	5 ft 9 in (1.75 m)	Fr	Millard South HS	Omaha, NE
G	32	Nia Anderson	5 ft 6 in (1.68 m)	Fr	Saint Mary's Stockton HS	Dublin, CA
F	33	Grace Schmidt	6 ft 0 in (1.83 m)	So	Watertown Luther Prep	Ixonia, WI

Head coach

- Jarrod Olson (Doane)

Assistant coach(es)

- Angie Ned (UC Irvine)
- Brittany Chambers (Cal Baptist)
- Kamille Diaz (Cal Baptist)
- Steve Yang (Missouri State)

Legend

- (C) Team captain
- (S) Suspended
- (I) Ineligible
- (W) Walk-on
- Injured
- Current redshirt

Roster
Last update: May 20, 2025

== Schedule ==
Date time, TV	Rank^{#}	Opponent^{#}	Result	Record	Site (attendance) city, state
Regular season
November 6, 2023*; 5:00 p.m., ESPN+		at UC San Diego	W 64–50	1–0	LionTree Arena (403); San Diego, CA
November 10, 2023*; 6:00 p.m., MW Network		at San Diego State	W 76–68	2–0	Viejas Arena (2,333); San Diego, CA
November 15, 2023*; 6:00 p.m., ESPN+		Long Beach State	W 82–71	3–0	Fowler Events Center (590); Riverside, CA
November 18, 2023*; 11:00 a.m., ESPN+		UTEP	W 90–87 ^{OT}	4–0	Fowler Events Center (314); Riverside, CA
November 22, 2023*; 2:00 p.m., ESPN+		Portland	W 71–66	5–0	Fowler Events Center (231); Riverside, CA
November 28, 2023; 5:30 p.m., ESPN+		at Southern Utah	W 79–66	6–0 (1–0)	America First Event Center (445); Cedar City, UT
December 6, 2023; 6:00 p.m., ESPN+		at Utah Tech	W 78–69	7–0 (2–0)	Burns Arena (395); St. George, UT
December 9, 2023*; 2:00 p.m., ESPN+		at Pepperdine	W 60–57	8–0	Firestone Fieldhouse (184); Malibu, CA
December 16, 2023*; 2:00 p.m., ESPN+		Cal State Fullerton	W 73–68	9–0	Fowler Events Center (401); Riverside, CA
December 18, 2023*; 4:00 p.m., ESPN+		at Louisiana Tech	L 51–77	9–1	Thomas Assembly Center (1,527); Ruston, LA
December 20, 2023*; 12:00 p.m., YouTube		at Texas Southern	W 83–62	10–1	H&PE Arena (150); Houston, TX
January 4, 2024; 6:00 p.m., ESPN+		Utah Valley	W 80–61	11–1 (3–0)	Fowler Events Center (454); Riverside, CA
January 6, 2024; 1:00 p.m., ESPN+		Seattle	W 94–79	12–1 (4–0)	Fowler Events Center (421); Riverside, CA
January 11, 2024; 5:00 p.m., ESPN+		at Tarleton State	W 89–59	13–1 (5–0)	Wisdom Gymnasium (810); Stephenville, TX
January 13, 2024; 11:00 a.m., ESPN+		at Abilene Christian	L 93–96 ^{OT}	13–2 (5–1)	Moody Coliseum (933); Abilene, TX
January 20, 2024; 1:00 p.m., ESPN+		Southern Utah	W 93–67	14–2 (6–1)	Fowler Events Center (478); Riverside, CA
January 25, 2024; 11:00 a.m., ESPN+		UT Rio Grande Valley	W 75–55	15–2 (7–1)	Fowler Events Center (4,417); Riverside, CA
January 25, 2024; 1:00 p.m., ESPN+		Stephen F. Austin	W 97–75	16–2 (8–1)	Fowler Events Center (616); Riverside, CA
February 3, 2024; 1:00 p.m., ESPN+		at Seattle	W 86–77	17–2 (9–1)	Redhawk Center (375); Seattle, WA
February 8, 2024; 4:00 p.m., ESPN+		at UT Arlington	W 94–92	18–2 (10–1)	College Park Center (1,473); Arlington, TX
February 10, 2024; 1:00 p.m., ESPN+		Utah Tech	W 73–65	19–2 (11–1)	Fowler Events Center (414); Riverside, CA
February 15, 2024; 5:00 p.m., ESPN+		at Utah Valley	L 89–92 ^{OT}	19–3 (11–2)	Lockhart Arena (407); Orem, UT
February 17, 2024; 1:00 p.m., ESPN+		Grand Canyon	W 71–65	20–3 (12–2)	Fowler Events Center (687); Riverside, CA
February 22, 2024; 6:00 p.m., ESPN+		Abilene Christian	W 70–58	21–3 (13–2)	Fowler Events Center (337); Riverside, CA
February 24, 2024; 1:00 p.m., ESPN+		Tarleton State	W 97–64	22–3 (14–2)	Fowler Events Center (401); Riverside, CA
February 29, 2024; 4:30 p.m., ESPN+		at Stephen F. Austin	W 100–96 ^{OT}	23–3 (15–2)	William R. Johnson Coliseum (1,294); Nacogdoches, TX
March 2, 2024; 12:00 p.m., ESPN+		at UT Rio Grande Valley	W 72–58	24–3 (16–2)	UTRGV Fieldhouse (462); Edinburg, TX
March 7, 2024; 6:00 p.m., ESPN+		UT Arlington	W 91–75	25–3 (17–2)	Fowler Events Center (1,157); Riverside, CA
March 9, 2024; 1:00 p.m., ESPN+		at Grand Canyon	W 85–81 ^{OT}	26–3 (18–2)	Global Credit Union Arena (1,436); Phoenix, AZ
WAC tournament
March 15, 2024; 12:00 p.m., ESPN+	(1)	vs. (5) UT Arlington; Semifinals	W 83–67	27–3	Orleans Arena; Paradise, NV
March 16, 2024; 10:30 a.m., ESPNU	(1)	vs. (2) Stephen F. Austin; Championship	W 75–74	28–3	Orleans Arena (759); Paradise, NV
NCAA women's tournament
March 23, 2024*; 6:30 p.m., ESPN2	(15 A2)	at (2 A2) No. 6 UCLA; First round	L 55–84	28–4	Pauley Pavilion (8,841); Los Angeles, CA
*Non-conference game. ^{#}Rankings from AP poll. (#) Tournament seedings in parentheses. A2=Albany 2. All times are in Pacific.

== See also ==
- 2023–24 California Baptist Lancers men's basketball team
