= 2023–24 Utah Tech Trailblazers women's basketball team =

American college basketball season

2023–24 Utah Tech Trailblazers women's basketball
- Conference: Western Athletic Conference
- Record: 18–14 (12–8 WAC)
- Head coach: JD Gustin (8th season)
- Associate head coach: Matt Thune
- Assistant coaches: Nicole Yazzie; Candace Thornton
- Home arena: Burns Arena

2023–24 WAC women's basketball standings
| | Conf. | | | | Overall |
| Team | W | | L | PCT | W | | L | PCT |
|---|---|---|---|---|---|---|---|---|
| California Baptist † | 18 | – | 2 | .900 | 28 | – | 4 | .875 |
| Grand Canyon | 16 | – | 4 | .800 | 24 | – | 8 | .750 |
| Stephen F. Austin | 14 | – | 6 | .700 | 21 | – | 12 | .636 |
| Utah Tech* | 12 | – | 8 | .600 | 18 | – | 14 | .563 |
| UT Arlington | 11 | – | 9 | .550 | 17 | – | 16 | .515 |
| Abilene Christian | 10 | – | 10 | .500 | 14 | – | 16 | .467 |
| Tarleton State* | 7 | – | 13 | .350 | 12 | – | 20 | .375 |
| Seattle | 6 | – | 14 | .300 | 6 | – | 23 | .207 |
| Southern Utah | 6 | – | 14 | .300 | 8 | – | 22 | .267 |
| UT Rio Grande Valley | 5 | – | 15 | .250 | 6 | – | 23 | .207 |
| Utah Valley | 5 | – | 15 | .250 | 10 | – | 19 | .345 |
† 2024 WAC tournament winner * Ineligible for the 2024 NCAA tournament due to transition from Division II

The 2023–24 Utah Tech Trailblazers women's basketball team represented Utah Tech University during the 2023–24 NCAA Division I women's basketball season. The Trailblazers, who were led by eighth-year head coach JD Gustin, played their home games at Burns Arena in St. George, Utah as members of the Western Athletic Conference.

This season marked Utah Tech's final year of a four-year transition period from Division II to Division I. As a result, the Trailblazers were not eligible to play in the NCAA tournament, but were eligible to play in the WAC tournament.

== Previous season ==
The Trailblazers finished the 2022–23 season 19–12, 10–8 in WAC play to finish in a tie for fifth place. They defeated Utah Valley in the first round of the WAC tournament, before falling to California Baptist in the quarterfinals.

== Roster ==
2023–24 Utah Tech Trailblazers women's basketball team
Players
Coaches

| Pos. | # | Name | Height | Year | Previous school | Hometown |
|---|---|---|---|---|---|---|
| G | 0 | Kastyn Young | 5 ft 11 in (1.8 m) | Fr | Harlan High School | Mico, Texas |
| G | 1 | Maddie Warren | 5 ft 10 in (1.78 m) | RS So | Lehi High School | Lehi, Utah |
| G | 2 | Macie Warren | 5 ft 10 in (1.78 m) | RS So | Lehi High School | Lehi, Utah |
| G | 3 | Amber Kartchner | 5 ft 9 in (1.75 m) | RS So | BYU | Logan, Utah |
| F | 5 | Catelyn Deaver | 6 ft 0 in (1.83 m) | So | Sumner High School | Sumner, Washington |
| G | 15 | Maggie McCord | 5 ft 8 in (1.73 m) | Sr | Bingham High School | South Jordan, Utah |
| G | 20 | Breaunna Gillen | 5 ft 9 in (1.75 m) | Sr | Copper Hills High School | West Jordan, Utah |
| F | 22 | Emily Isaacson | 5 ft 11 in (1.8 m) | RS Sr | Box Elder High School | Perry, Utah |
| F | 23 | Caitlynn Jordan | 6 ft 2 in (1.88 m) | Fr | Dallas Christian School | Fate, Texas |
| G | 24 | Calyn Dallas | 6 ft 1 in (1.85 m) | Fr | Cooper High School | Lubbock, Texas |
| F | 25 | Nicole Willardson | 6 ft 4 in (1.93 m) | Fr | Richfield High School | Richfield, Utah |
| F | 33 | Alyson Deaver | 6 ft 0 in (1.83 m) | So | Sumner High School | Sumner, Washington |

Head coach

- JD Gustin (Montana Western)

Assistant coach(es)

- Matt Thune (Indiana)
- Nicole Yazzie (Westminster)
- Candace Thornton (Colorado–Colorado Springs)

Legend

- (C) Team captain
- (S) Suspended
- (I) Ineligible
- (W) Walk-on
- Injured
- Current redshirt

Roster
Last update: June 1, 2024

== Schedule and results ==
| Date time, TV | Rank^{#} | Opponent^{#} | Result | Record | Site (attendance) city, state |
Greece Tour
| August 12, 2023*; 9:30 am | | at Amelia Peristeriou | W 119–45 | – | Athens, Greece |
| August 14, 2023*; 10:00 am | | at Athens All-Stars | W 88–68 | – | Athens, Greece |
Regular season
| November 6, 2023*; 11:00 am, ESPN+ | | La Verne | W 116–59 | 1–0 | Burns Arena (1,900); St. George, UT |
| November 9, 2023*; 7:00 pm, ESPN+ | | Jacksonville State; WAC/C-USA Challenge | W 73–58 | 2–0 | Burns Arena (592); St. George, UT |
| November 14, 2023*; 7:30 pm, MW Network | | at UNLV | L 67–100 | 2–1 | Cox Pavilion (803); Paradise, NV |
| November 20, 2023*; 12:00 pm, ESPN+ | | at Texas A&M–Commerce | L 75–84 | 2–2 | University Field House (219); Commerce, TX |
| November 22, 2023*; 12:00 pm, ESPN+ | | at New Hampshire | W 56–46 | 3–2 | Lundholm Gym (166); Durham, NH |
| November 25, 2023*; 12:00 pm, NEC Front Row | | at Stonehill | W 81–58 | 4–2 | Merkert Gymnasium (118); Easton, MA |
| December 2, 2023; 2:00 pm, ESPN+ | | at Utah Valley | W 73–59 | 5–2 (1–0) | UCCU Center (615); Orem, UT |
| December 6, 2023; 7:00 pm, ESPN+ | | California Baptist | L 69–78 | 5–3 (1–1) | Burns Arena (395); St. George, UT |
| December 9, 2023*; 2:00 pm, ESPN+ | | Weber State | L 67–77 | 5–4 | Burns Arena (367); St. George, UT |
| December 16, 2023*; 2:00 pm, ESPN+ | | Bethesda | W 110–35 | 6–4 | Burns Arena (291); St. George, UT |
| December 19, 2023*; 2:00 pm, ESPN+ | | Oregon; Trailblazer Classic | W 92–86 | 7–4 | Burns Arena (486); St. George, UT |
| December 20, 2023*; 2:00 pm, ESPN+ | | Oklahoma State; Trailblazer Classic | L 61–87 | 7–5 | Burns Arena (417); St. George, UT |
| December 30, 2023*; 11:00 am, ESPN+ | | at FIU | L 62–68 | 7–6 | Ocean Bank Convocation Center (298); Miami, FL |
| January 4, 2024; 7:00 pm, ESPN+ | | Seattle | W 81–65 | 8–6 (2–1) | Burns Arena (405); St. George, UT |
| January 6, 2024; 2:00 pm, ESPN+ | | at Grand Canyon | L 48–73 | 8–7 (2–2) | Global Credit Union Arena (687); Phoenix, AZ |
| January 11, 2024; 5:30 pm, ESPN+ | | at Stephen F. Austin | L 67–76 | 8–8 (2–3) | William R. Johnson Coliseum (614); Nacogdoches, TX |
| January 18, 2024; 7:00 pm, ESPN+ | | Southern Utah | W 78–71 | 9–8 (3–3) | Burns Arena (940); St. George, UT |
| January 20, 2024; 2:00 pm, ESPN+ | | Utah Valley | L 52–55 | 9–9 (3–4) | Burns Arena (668); St. George, UT |
| January 25, 2024; 7:00 pm, ESPN+ | | Abilene Christian | W 78–69 | 10–9 (4–4) | Burns Arena (596); St. George, UT |
| January 27, 2024; 2:00 pm, ESPN+ | | Tarleton State | W 75–48 | 11–9 (5–4) | Burns Arena (441); St. George, UT |
| February 1, 2024; 11:00 am, ESPN+ | | at UT Rio Grande Valley | W 91–55 | 12–9 (6–4) | UTRGV Fieldhouse (2,573); Edinburg, TX |
| February 3, 2024; 1:30 pm, ESPN+ | | at UT Arlington | W 72–60 | 13–9 (7–4) | College Park Center (1,246); Arlington, TX |
| February 8, 2024; 6:30 pm, ESPN+ | | at Southern Utah | W 87–77 | 14–9 (8–4) | America First Event Center (765); Cedar City, UT |
| February 10, 2024; 2:00 pm, ESPN+ | | at California Baptist | L 65–73 | 14–10 (8–5) | Fowler Events Center (414); Riverside, CA |
| February 15, 2024; 7:00 pm, ESPN+ | | Grand Canyon | L 41–88 | 14–11 (8–6) | Burns Arena (522); St. George, UT |
| February 17, 2024; 2:00 pm, ESPN+ | | at Seattle | W 89–75 | 15–11 (9–6) | Redhawk Center (280); Seattle, WA |
| February 24, 2024; 1:00 pm, ESPN+ | | UT Arlington | W 88–69 | 16–11 (10–6) | Burns Arena (612); St. George, UT |
| February 29, 2024; 6:00 pm, ESPN+ | | at Tarleton State | L 60–76 | 16–12 (10–7) | Wisdom Gym (1,013); Stephenville, TX |
| March 2, 2024; 12:00 pm, ESPN+ | | at Abilene Christian | L 62–74 | 16–13 (10–8) | Moody Coliseum (1,008); Abilene, TX |
| March 7, 2024; 7:00 pm, ESPN+ | | UT Rio Grande Valley | W 81–55 | 17–13 (11–8) | Burns Arena (497); St. George, UT |
| March 9, 2024; 2:00 pm, ESPN+ | | Stephen F. Austin | W 69–61 | 18–13 (12–8) | Burns Arena (570); St. George, UT |
WAC tournament
| March 14, 2024; 1:00 pm, ESPN+ | (4) | vs. (5) UT Arlington; Quarterfinals | L 57–72 | 18–14 | Orleans Arena (–); Paradise, NV |
*Non-conference game. ^{#}Rankings from AP Poll. (#) Tournament seedings in parentheses. All times are in Mountain.
