= 2023–24 UT Rio Grande Valley Vaqueros women's basketball team =

American college basketball season

2023–24 UT Rio Grande Valley Vaqueros women's basketball
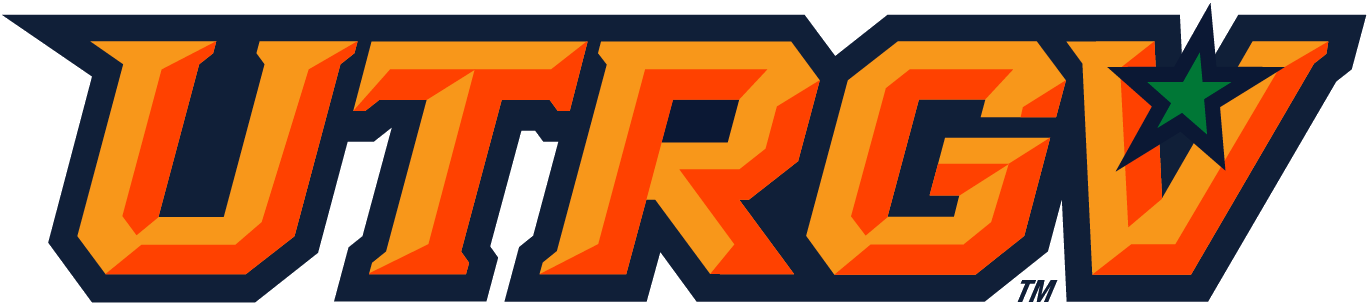
- Conference: Western Athletic Conference
- Record: 6–23 (5–15 WAC)
- Head coach: Lane Lord (6th season)
- Associate head coach: Kevin Hackerott
- Assistant coaches: Ipek Turkyilmaz; Keanna Keys; Victoria Pena; Krisynthia Sampson
- Home arena: UTRGV Fieldhouse

2023–24 WAC women's basketball standings
	Conf.				Overall
Team	W		L	PCT	W		L	PCT
California Baptist †	18	–	2	.900	28	–	4	.875
Grand Canyon	16	–	4	.800	24	–	8	.750
Stephen F. Austin	14	–	6	.700	21	–	12	.636
Utah Tech*	12	–	8	.600	18	–	14	.563
UT Arlington	11	–	9	.550	17	–	16	.515
Abilene Christian	10	–	10	.500	14	–	16	.467
Tarleton State*	7	–	13	.350	12	–	20	.375
Seattle	6	–	14	.300	6	–	23	.207
Southern Utah	6	–	14	.300	8	–	22	.267
UT Rio Grande Valley	5	–	15	.250	6	–	23	.207
Utah Valley	5	–	15	.250	10	–	19	.345
† 2024 WAC tournament winner * Ineligible for the 2024 NCAA tournament due to transition from Division II

The 2023–24 UT Rio Grande Valley Vaqueros women's basketball team represented the University of Texas Rio Grande Valley during the 2023–24 NCAA Division I women's basketball season. The Vaqueros, who were led by sixth-year head coach Lane Lord, played their home games at UTRGV Fieldhouse in Edinburg, Texas as members of the Western Athletic Conference (WAC).

This would be the Vaqueros' last season as members of the WAC, as on March 25, 2024, it was announced that the school had accepted an invitation to join the Southland Conference, with the move becoming official on July 1, 2024.

== Previous season ==
The Vaqueros finished the 2022–23 season 6–23, 5–15 in WAC play, to finish in a tie for tenth (last) place. Due to the WAC's new Resume Seeding ranking, which is an advanced analytic developed by Ken Pomeroy that incorporated the performance of teams in both conference and non-conference games, they failed to qualify for the WAC tournament, as only the top 12 teams qualify.

== Roster ==
2023–24 UT Rio Grande Valley Vaqueros women's basketball team
Players
Coaches

Pos.	#	Name	Height	Year	Previous school	Hometown
G	0	Tierra Trotter	5 ft 4 in (1.63 m)	Jr	NW Mississippi Community College	Bryant, AR
F	1	Charlotte O'Keefe	6 ft 3 in (1.91 m)	So	Saint Thomas Aquinas High School	Overland Park, KS
G	2	Iyana Dorsey	5 ft 6 in (1.68 m)	Jr	Tarleton State	Saginaw, TX
F	3	Zariah Sango	6 ft 4 in (1.93 m)	Sr	Clarendon College	Tulsa, OK
G	4	Ja'Shelle Johnson	5 ft 4 in (1.63 m)	Fr	Johnson High School	San Antonio, TX
G	5	Aaliyah McMillan	5 ft 8 in (1.73 m)	RS So	UT Arlington	San Antonio, TX
F	10	Ashton McCorry	6 ft 1 in (1.85 m)	GS	Garden City Community College	Wichita, KS
G	11	Jayda Holiman	5 ft 7 in (1.7 m)	Fr	McAlester High School	McAlester, OK
G/F	12	Kade Hackerott	5 ft 11 in (1.8 m)	Jr	Central Missouri	Wichita, KS
F	15	Nyajah Mitchels	6 ft 4 in (1.93 m)	GS	Tarleton State	Jacksonville, NC
G	21	Arianna Sturdivant	5 ft 8 in (1.73 m)	Jr	George Bush High School	Richmond, TX
G/F	22	Faith Phillips	5 ft 11 in (1.8 m)	Jr	St. Mary's	San Marcos, TX
F	23	Deborah Ogayemi	5 ft 11 in (1.8 m)	Jr	Tyler Junior College	Waterford, Ireland
G/F	25	Mariam Traore	6 ft 0 in (1.83 m)	Jr	Clarendon College	Bamako, Mali
G	33	Taylor Meyners	5 ft 7 in (1.7 m)	Fr	Georgetown High School	Georgetown, TX

Head coach

- Lane Lord (Tabor)

Assistant coach(es)

- Kevin Hackerott (St. Mary of the Plains)
- Ipek Turkyilmaz (Arizona)
- Keanna Keys (Little Rock)
- Victoria Pena (Stephen F. Austin)
- Krisynthia Sampson (UTRGV)

Legend

- (C) Team captain
- (S) Suspended
- (I) Ineligible
- (W) Walk-on
- Injured
- Current redshirt

Roster
Last update: June 4, 2024

== Schedule and results ==
Date time, TV	Rank^{#}	Opponent^{#}	Result	Record	Site (attendance) city, state
Puerto Rico Trip
August 10, 2023*; 6:00 p.m.		at Hatillo Ganaderas	W 72–52	–	Francisco Deida Coliseum; Hatillo, Puerto Rico
August 11, 2023*; 6:00 p.m.		at Bayamón Vaqueras	W 77–44	–	Coliseo Rubén Rodríguez; Bayamón, Puerto Rico
Exhibition
November 4, 2023*; 2:00 p.m.		St. Mary's	L 64–70	–	UTRGV Fieldhouse; Edinburg, TX
Regular season
November 7, 2023*; 6:00 p.m., ESPN+		at Texas Tech	L 53–95	0–1	United Supermarkets Arena (4,140); Lubbock, TX
November 10, 2023*; 6:30 p.m., ESPN+		FIU; WAC/CUSA Challenge	L 64–65	0–2	UTRGV Fieldhouse (634); Edinburg, TX
November 17, 2023*; 5:00 p.m., ESPN+		at Texas State	L 63–66	0–3	Strahan Arena; San Marcos, TX
November 19, 2023*; 2:00 p.m., ESPN+		at Incarnate Word	L 57–67	0–4	McDermott Center (261); San Antonio, TX
November 22, 2023*; 1:00 p.m., ESPN+		Oral Roberts	L 63–72	0–5	UTRGV Fieldhouse (427); Edinburg, TX
November 29, 2023; 8:00 p.m., ESPN+		at Grand Canyon	L 50–63	0–6 (0–1)	Global Credit Union Arena (1,000); Phoenix, AZ
December 2, 2023; 2:00 p.m., ESPN+		Tarleton State	L 66–72	0–7 (0–2)	UTRGV Fieldhouse (358); Edinburg, TX
December 5, 2023*; 7:00 p.m., ESPN+		at Texas A&M–Corpus Christi; South Texas Showdown	L 46–69	0–8	American Bank Center (1,363); Corpus Christi, TX
December 14, 2023*; 6:30 p.m., ESPN+		Texas A&M–Corpus Christi; South Texas Showdown	L 51–57	0–9	UTRGV Fieldhouse (718); Edinburg, TX
December 20, 2023*; 6:30 p.m., ESPN+		No. 5 Texas; Bert Ogden Arena Series	L 51–104	0–10	Bert Ogden Arena (6,591); Edinburg, TX
December 30, 2023*; 2:00 p.m., ESPN+		at Sam Houston; WAC/CUSA Challenge	W 66–58	1–10	Bernard Johnson Coliseum (407); Huntsville, TX
January 4, 2024; 6:30 p.m., ESPN+		at Stephen F. Austin	L 69–79	1–11 (0–3)	William R. Johnson Coliseum (754); Nacogdoches, TX
January 6, 2024; 2:00 p.m., ESPN+		Abilene Christian	L 53–62	1–12 (0–4)	UTRGV Fieldhouse (422); Edinburg, TX
January 11, 2024; 8:00 p.m., ESPN+		at Seattle	W 84–77	2–12 (1–4)	Redhawk Center (262); Seattle, WA
January 13, 2024; 3:00 p.m., ESPN+		at Utah Valley	L 62–75	2–13 (1–5)	UCCU Center (411); Orem, UT
January 18, 2024; 6:30 p.m., ESPN+		UT Arlington	W 64–62	3–13 (2–5)	UTRGV Fieldhouse (1,077); Edinburg, TX
January 20, 2024; 2:00 p.m., ESPN+		at Tarleton State	W 61–57	4–13 (3–5)	Wisdom Gym (490); Stephenville, TX
January 25, 2024; 1:00 p.m., ESPN+		at California Baptist	L 55–75	4–14 (3–6)	Fowler Events Center (4,417); Riverside, CA
February 1, 2024; 12:00 p.m., ESPN+		Utah Tech	L 55–91	4–15 (3–7)	UTRGV Fieldhouse (2,573); Edinburg, TX
February 3, 2024; 2:00 p.m., ESPN+		Southern Utah	L 65–68 ^{OT}	4–16 (3–8)	UTRGV Fieldhouse (546); Edinburg, TX
February 8, 2024; 6:30 p.m., ESPN+		Stephen F. Austin	W 62–49	5–16 (4–8)	UTRGV Fieldhouse (1,497); Edinburg, TX
February 15, 2024; 6:00 p.m., ESPN+		at Abilene Christian	L 69–76	5–17 (4–9)	Moody Coliseum (1,082); Abilene, TX
February 17, 2024; 2:00 p.m., ESPN+		at UT Arlington	L 55–71	5–18 (4–10)	College Park Center (1,157); Arlington, TX
February 22, 2024; 6:30 p.m., ESPN+		Utah Valley	W 63–62	6–18 (5–10)	UTRGV Fieldhouse (777); Edinburg, TX
February 24, 2024; 2:00 p.m., ESPN+		Seattle	L 75–82	6–19 (5–11)	UTRGV Fieldhouse (421); Edinburg, TX
February 29, 2024; 6:30 p.m., ESPN+		Grand Canyon	L 40–66	6–20 (5–12)	UTRGV Fieldhouse (625); Edinburg, TX
March 2, 2024; 2:00 p.m., ESPN+		California Baptist	L 58–72	6–21 (5–13)	UTRGV Fieldhouse (462); Edinburg, TX
March 7, 2024; 8:00 p.m., ESPN+		at Utah Tech	L 55–81	6–22 (5–14)	Burns Arena (497); St. George, UT
March 9, 2024; 3:00 p.m., ESPN+		at Southern Utah	L 52–65	6–23 (5–15)	America First Event Center (485); Cedar City, UT
*Non-conference game. ^{#}Rankings from AP poll. (#) Tournament seedings in parentheses. All times are in Central.
