= 2023–24 Stephen F. Austin Ladyjacks basketball team =

American college basketball season

2023–24 Stephen F. Austin Ladyjacks basketball
- Conference: Western Athletic Conference
- Record: 22–12 (14–6 WAC)
- Head coach: Leonard Bishop (1st season)
- Associate head coach: Patrick Harrison
- Assistant coaches: Jordynn Hernandez; Lexi Murphy
- Home arena: William R. Johnson Coliseum

2023–24 WAC women's basketball standings
	Conf.				Overall
Team	W		L	PCT	W		L	PCT
California Baptist †	18	–	2	.900	28	–	4	.875
Grand Canyon	16	–	4	.800	24	–	8	.750
Stephen F. Austin	14	–	6	.700	21	–	12	.636
Utah Tech*	12	–	8	.600	18	–	14	.563
UT Arlington	11	–	9	.550	17	–	16	.515
Abilene Christian	10	–	10	.500	14	–	16	.467
Tarleton State*	7	–	13	.350	12	–	20	.375
Seattle	6	–	14	.300	6	–	23	.207
Southern Utah	6	–	14	.300	8	–	22	.267
UT Rio Grande Valley	5	–	15	.250	6	–	23	.207
Utah Valley	5	–	15	.250	10	–	19	.345
† 2024 WAC tournament winner * Ineligible for the 2024 NCAA tournament due to transition from Division II

The 2023–24 Stephen F. Austin Ladyjacks basketball team represented Stephen F. Austin State University during the 2023–24 NCAA Division I women's basketball season. The Ladyjacks, who were led by first-year head coach Leonard Bishop, played their home games at the William R. Johnson Coliseum in Nacogdoches, Texas as members of the Western Athletic Conference (WAC).

This would be Stephen F. Austin's last season as members of the WAC, as on May 29, 2024, it was announced that they will be returning to the Southland Conference, which they left in 2021, with the move becoming official on July 1, 2024.

== Previous season ==
The Ladyjacks finished the 2022–23 season 27–7, 15–3 in WAC play, to finish in second place. Due to the WAC's new Resume Seeding ranking, which is an advanced analytic developed by Ken Pomeroy that incorporated the performance of teams in both conference and non-conference games, received the #1 seed in the WAC tournament. There, they defeated Sam Houston in the quarterfinals, before falling to California Baptist in the semifinals. They received an automatic bid into the WNIT, where they would defeat Texas State in the first round, before falling to Arkansas in the second round.

On April 3, 2023, it was announced that head coach Mark Kellogg would be leaving the program after eight seasons, in order to take the head coaching position at West Virginia. On April 18, the school announced that associate head coach Leonard Bishop would be named Kellogg's successor.

== Roster ==
2023–24 Stephen F. Austin Ladyjacks women's basketball team
Players
Coaches

Pos.	#	Name	Height	Year	Previous school	Hometown
F	1	Zoe Nelson	6 ft 2 in (1.88 m)	Jr	Hendrickson High School	Austin, TX
G	2	Tyler McCliment-Call	6 ft 0 in (1.83 m)	Sr	Portland	Spokane, WA
G	3	Avery VanSickle	5 ft 10 in (1.78 m)	RS So	Regis Jesuit High School	Denver, CO
G	4	Destini Lombard	5 ft 9 in (1.75 m)	Sr	LSU	New Iberia, LA
G	10	Trinity Slocum	5 ft 9 in (1.75 m)	RS So	Mountain View High School	Boise, ID
PG	11	Lydia Cooke-Wiggins	5 ft 7 in (1.7 m)	Fr	John Paul II High School	Dallas, TX
G	12	Kyla Deck	5 ft 9 in (1.75 m)	So	Lone Star High School	Frisco, TX
F	13	Ituau Tuisaula	6 ft 1 in (1.85 m)	Jr	Peninsula College	Soldotna, AK
F	14	Jasmyne Boles	6 ft 1 in (1.85 m)	RS Sr	North Texas	Nampa, ID
G	15	Mimi Gatewood	5 ft 6 in (1.68 m)	So	DeSoto High School	DeSoto, TX
C	24	Kurstyn Harden	6 ft 3 in (1.91 m)	RS Sr	Northern Colorado	Lufkin, TX
F	33	Trinity Moore	6 ft 0 in (1.83 m)	Jr	Oral Roberts	Oklahoma City, OK
G	35	Mele Finau	5 ft 9 in (1.75 m)	GS	UC Riverside	Dublin, CA
G	42	Atalia Ballesteros	5 ft 10 in (1.78 m)	Fr	Padre Piquer	Madrid, Spain

Head coach

- Leonard Bishop (East Texas A&M)

Assistant coach(es)

- Patrick Harrison (Hesston)
- Jordynn Hernandez (UT Arlington)
- Lexi Murphy (Angelo State)

Legend

- (C) Team captain
- (S) Suspended
- (I) Ineligible
- (W) Walk-on
- Injured
- Current redshirt

Roster
Last update: June 1, 2024

== Schedule and results ==
Date time, TV	Rank^{#}	Opponent^{#}	Result	Record	Site (attendance) city, state
Regular season
November 6, 2023*; 9:30 p.m., ESPN+		Oklahoma Panhandle State	W 118–46	1–0	William R. Johnson Coliseum (–); Nacogdoches, TX
November 10, 2023*; 6:30 p.m., ESPN+		Liberty; WAC/C-USA Challenge	L 81–84 ^{OT}	1–1	William R. Johnson Coliseum (1,087); Nacogdoches, TX
November 16, 2023*; 6:30 p.m., ESPN+		North Texas	L 55–78	1–2	William R. Johnson Coliseum (1,126); Nacogdoches, TX
November 22, 2023*; 7:00 p.m.		at Texas Southern	W 73–58	2–2	H&PE Arena (377); Houston, TX
November 25, 2023*; 2:00 p.m., ESPN+		Rice	W 67–56	3–2	William R. Johnson Coliseum (751); Nacogdoches, TX
November 29, 2023; 7:00 p.m., ESPN+		at Tarleton State	W 80–67	4–2 (1–0)	Wisdom Gym (857); Stephenville, TX
December 2, 2023; 2:00 p.m., ESPN+		Abilene Christian	W 89–82 ^{2OT}	5–2 (2–0)	William R. Johnson Coliseum (1,148); Nacogdoches, TX
December 7, 2023*; 6:30 p.m., ESPN+		Portland	W 76–71	6–2	William R. Johnson Coliseum (1,182); Nacogdoches, TX
December 9, 2023*; 2:00 p.m., SECN+		at Alabama	L 69–74	6–3	Coleman Coliseum (2,202); Tuscaloosa, AL
December 17, 2023*; 2:00 p.m., ESPN+		at Middle Tennessee	L 47–72	6–4	Murphy Center (3,359); Murfreesboro, TN
December 20, 2023*; 3:30 p.m.		vs. Troy; Austin Peay Classic	L 78–98	6–5	F&M Bank Arena (1,548); Clarksville, TN
December 21, 2023*; 2:30 p.m., ESPN+		at Austin Peay; Austin Peay Classic	W 66–56	7–5	F&M Bank Arena (1,632); Clarksville, TN
December 30, 2023*; 1:00 p.m., ESPN+		UNT Dallas	W 111–38	8–5	William R. Johnson Coliseum (1,320); Nacogdoches, TX
January 4, 2024; 6:30 p.m., ESPN+		UT Rio Grande Valley	W 79–69	9–5 (3–0)	William R. Johnson Coliseum (754); Nacogdoches, TX
January 6, 2024; 2:00 p.m., ESPN+		at UT Arlington	L 62–81	9–6 (3–1)	College Park Center (899); Arlington, TX
January 11, 2024; 6:30 p.m., ESPN+		Utah Tech	W 76–67	10–6 (4–1)	William R. Johnson Coliseum (614); Nacogdoches, TX
January 13, 2024; 2:00 p.m., ESPN+		Southern Utah	W 68–53	11–6 (5–1)	William R. Johnson Coliseum (1,116); Nacogdoches, TX
January 18, 2024; 8:00 p.m., ESPN+		at Seattle	W 82–66	12–6 (6–1)	Redhawk Center (286); Seattle, WA
January 25, 2024; 7:00 p.m., ESPN+		at Grand Canyon	W 59–54	13–6 (7–1)	Global Credit Union Arena (568); Phoenix, AZ
January 27, 2024; 3:00 p.m., ESPN+		at California Baptist	L 75–97	13–7 (7–2)	Fowler Events Center (616); Riverside, CA
February 1, 2024; 7:00 p.m., ESPN+		at Utah Valley	W 72–63	14–7 (8–2)	UCCU Center (521); Orem, UT
February 3, 2024; 2:00 p.m., ESPN+		Tarleton State	W 73–62	15–7 (9–2)	William R. Johnson Coliseum (1,136); Nacogdoches, TX
February 8, 2024; 6:30 p.m., ESPN+		at UT Rio Grande Valley	L 49–62	15–8 (9–3)	UTRGV Fieldhouse (1,497); Edinburg, TX
February 10, 2024; 2:30 p.m., ESPN+		UT Arlington	L 74–84	15–9 (9–4)	William R. Johnson Coliseum (1,682); Nacogdoches, TX
February 17, 2024; 1:00 p.m., ESPN+		at Abilene Christian	W 89–83	16–9 (10–4)	Moody Coliseum (1,051); Abilene, TX
February 22, 2024; 6:30 p.m., ESPN+		Seattle	W 87–62	17–9 (11–4)	William R. Johnson Coliseum (1,585); Nacogdoches, TX
February 24, 2024; 2:00 p.m., ESPN+		Utah Valley	W 84–35	18–9 (12–4)	William R. Johnson Coliseum (1,232); Nacogdoches, TX
February 29, 2024; 6:30 p.m., ESPN+		California Baptist	L 96–100 ^{OT}	18–10 (12–5)	William R. Johnson Coliseum (1,294); Nacogdoches, TX
March 2, 2024; 2:00 p.m., ESPN+		Grand Canyon	W 85–77	19–10 (13–5)	William R. Johnson Coliseum (1,328); Nacogdoches, TX
March 7, 2024; 7:30 p.m., ESPN+		at Southern Utah	W 81–74	20–10 (14–5)	America First Event Center (480); Cedar City, UT
March 9, 2024; 3:00 p.m., ESPN+		at Utah Tech	L 61–69	20–11 (14–6)	Burns Arena (570); St. George, UT
WAC tournament
March 14, 2024; 4:30 p.m., ESPN+	(3)	vs. (7) Tarleton State; Quarterfinals	W 70–58	21–11	Orleans Arena (–); Paradise, NV
March 15, 2024; 4:30 p.m., ESPN+	(3)	vs. (2) Grand Canyon; Semifinals	W 66–63	22–11	Orleans Arena (1,343); Paradise, NV
March 16, 2024; 12:30 p.m., ESPNU/ESPN+	(3)	vs. (1) California Baptist; Championship	L 74–75	22–12	Orleans Arena (759); Paradise, NV
*Non-conference game. ^{#}Rankings from AP poll. (#) Tournament seedings in parentheses. All times are in Central.
