= Peaster Independent School District =

School district in Texas

Coordinates: 32.8664°N 97.8667°W

Location
- Peaster, Texas; United States

District information
- Type: Public
- Motto: Growing a tradition of excellence
- Superintendent: Lance Johnson

Students and staff
- District mascot: Greyhound

Other information
- Website: www.peaster.net

The Peaster Independent School District is a school district based in the unincorporated community of Peaster in Parker County, Texas (USA).

== Schools ==
The district has four schools:

- Peaster High School
- Peaster Junior High School
- Peaster Intermediate School
- Peaster Elementary School

== Mascot ==
The high school, middle school, and elementary school all use the greyhound as their mascot.

== Academic status ==
In 2009, the school district was rated "recognized" by the Texas Education Agency.

== See also ==
- List of school districts in Texas
