= Skyler Young =

American basketball coach

Biographical details
- Education: Western Michigan (2005)

Coaching career (HC unless noted)
- 2005–2008: Western Michigan (asst.)
- 2008–2009: Detroit Mercy (asst.)
- 2009–2012: Ohio (asst.)
- 2012–2016: Bradley (asst.)
- 2016–2018: Weber State (asst.)
- 2018–2023: Portland (asst.)
- 2023–2026: Seattle

Head coaching record
- Overall: 15–74 (.169)

Skyler Young is an American basketball coach who recently was the head coach of the Seattle Redhawks women's basketball team.

== Coaching career ==
On April 19, 2023, Young was named the sixth head coach in women's basketball program history at Seattle University. On March 2, 2026, Seattle announced that Young's contract will not be renewed.
