= 1991 WAC women's basketball tournament =

- Classification: Division I
- Teams: 4
- Site: Arena-Auditorium; Laramie, WY
- Champions: Utah (1st title)
- MVP: Mikki Kane (Utah)

The 1991 Western Athletic Conference women's basketball tournament was held March 8–9 at the Arena-Auditorium at the University of Wyoming in Laramie, Wyoming. It was the first ever WAC women's basketball tournament. Utah beat Creighton 86–69 to win the automatic bid to the 1991 NCAA Division I women's basketball tournament.

== Format ==
The tournament field comprised four teams. The most attended of the four games was the Creighton semi-final game, with 662, while the final had 278 attend and the Utah semi-final have 621. Kieishsha Garnes scored 44 points (on 17-of-28 shooting) for San Diego State against Creighton, a tournament record that still stands as of 2020.

== Bracket ==
Semifinals; Friday, March 8
1	Creighton	78
4	San Diego State	75
2	Utah	74
3	Wyoming	62

Championship; Saturday, March 9
1ME	Creighton	69
1MW	Utah	86

== All-Tournament Team ==
- Melanee Brooks-McQueen, Utah
- Kieishsha Garnes, San Diego State
- Kathy Halligan, Creighton
- Mikki Kane, Utah (MVP)
- Shannon Struby, Creighton
