= Peaster, Texas =

Peaster
- Unincorporated community
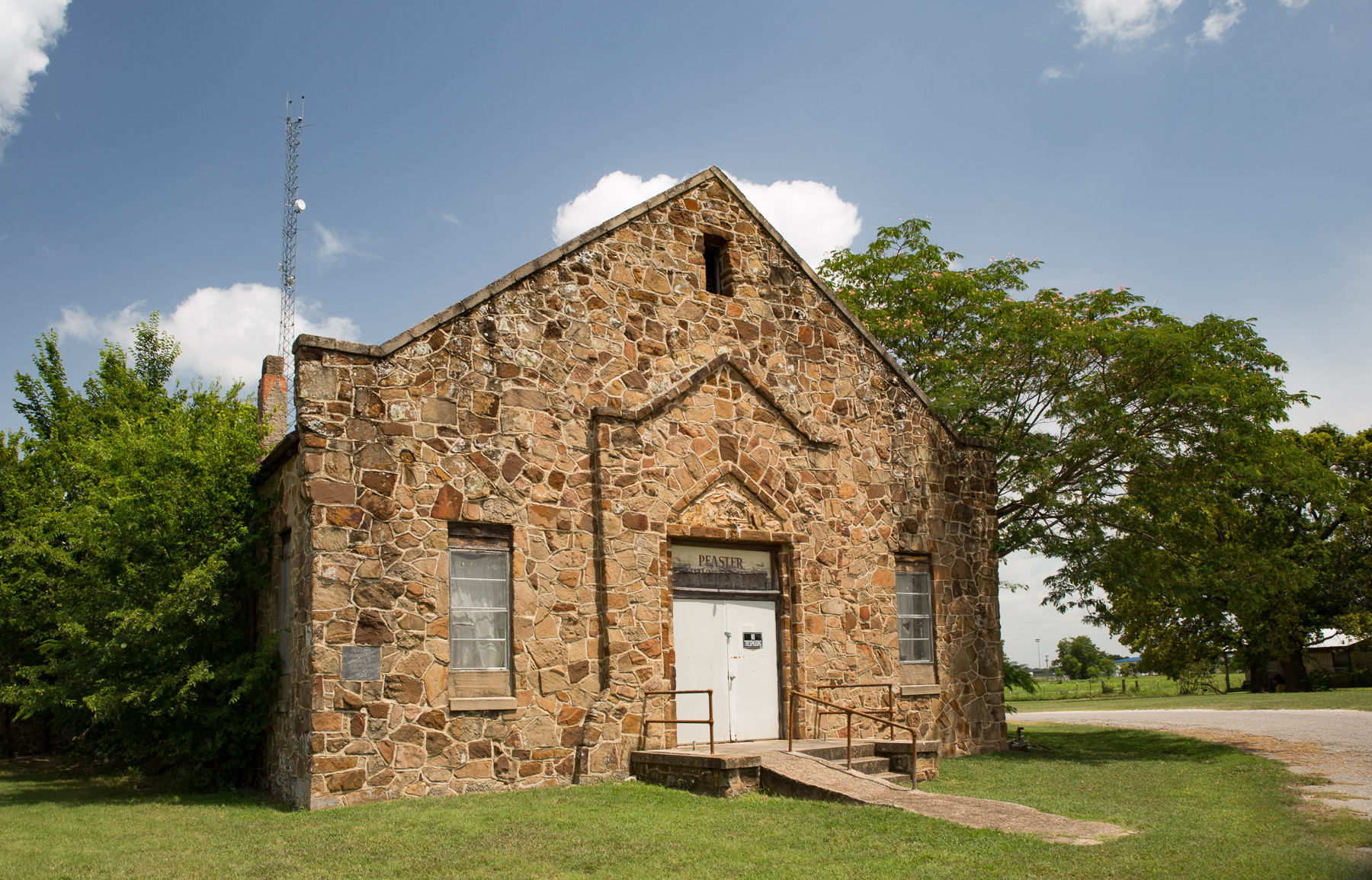
- Peaster Methodist Church

- Location within the state of Texas Peaster (the United States)
- Coordinates: 32°49′48″N 97°51′16″W
- Country: United States
- State: Texas
- County: Parker
- Elevation: 1,243 ft (379 m)
- Time zone: UTC-6 (Central (CST))
  - Summer (DST): UTC-5 (CDT)
- GNIS feature ID: 2797202
- Website: townofpeaster.com

Peaster is an unincorporated community in Parker County, Texas, United States, nine miles (14 km) northwest of Weatherford.

== History ==
Settlement began in the 1870s when Georgia native H.H. Peaster bought 160 acres (65 ha) of land and built a house. The community that developed near the site of his home was originally called Freemont; in 1885 the name was changed to Peasterville. Throughout the 20th century, Peaster has served area farmers as a school and church community. During the mid-1920s the town's population grew to approximately 300, but this was soon followed by a steep decline after the Great Depression. From 1975 to 1990, Peaster had around 80 residents. Current estimates put the population at approximately 100.

== Education ==
The Peaster Independent School District serves the community and is home to the Peaster High School Greyhounds. Peaster High School has many sports, which include: Basketball, Baseball, Football, Golf, Tennis, Track and Field, Softball, Volleyball, and Cross-country.

== Notable person ==
Peaster is the birthplace of writer Robert E. Howard, creator of the character Conan the Barbarian.
