= Peaster High School (Texas) =

Location
- 3600 Harwell Lake Rd. Weatherford, Texas 76088; United States; 32.86762°N 97.86513°W

Information
- School type: Public High School
- School district: Peaster Independent School District
- Principal: Doug McCollough
- Teaching staff: 40.85 (FTE)
- Grades: 9-12
- Enrollment: 511 (2023-2024)
- Student to teacher ratio: 12.39
- Colors: Blue & white
- Athletics conference: UIL Class 3A
- Mascot: Greyhound
- Yearbook: Retrospect
- Website: Peaster High School

Peaster High School is a public high school located in unincorporated Peaster, Texas, United States. It is part of the Peaster Independent School District located in north central Parker County and classified as a 3A school by the UIL. While the school is in Peaster, it has a Weatherford address. In 2013, the school was rated "Met Standard" by the Texas Education Agency.

== Athletics ==
The Peaster Greyhounds compete in cross country, volleyball, football, basketball, powerlifting, golf, tennis, track, softball, and baseball.

=== State titles ===
- Boys' basketball
  - 1999 (2A), 2000 (2A)

=== State finalists ===
- Girls' volleyball
  - 2016 (3A)
- Boys' basketball
  - 2020 (3A)

== Notable alumni ==
- Ben Sandoval, co-creator of Among Us
