= 2024 WAC women's basketball tournament =

Postseason men's basketball tournament

- Classification: Division I
- Season: 2023–24
- Teams: 8
- Site: Orleans Arena; Paradise, Nevada
- Champions: California Baptist (2nd title)
- Winning coach: Jarrod Olson (2nd title)
- Television: ESPN+, ESPNU

2023–24 WAC women's basketball standings
	Conf.				Overall
Team	W		L	PCT	W		L	PCT
California Baptist †	18	–	2	.900	28	–	4	.875
Grand Canyon	16	–	4	.800	24	–	8	.750
Stephen F. Austin	14	–	6	.700	21	–	12	.636
Utah Tech*	12	–	8	.600	18	–	14	.563
UT Arlington	11	–	9	.550	17	–	16	.515
Abilene Christian	10	–	10	.500	14	–	16	.467
Tarleton State*	7	–	13	.350	12	–	20	.375
Seattle	6	–	14	.300	6	–	23	.207
Southern Utah	6	–	14	.300	8	–	22	.267
UT Rio Grande Valley	5	–	15	.250	6	–	23	.207
Utah Valley	5	–	15	.250	10	–	19	.345
† 2024 WAC tournament winner * Ineligible for the 2024 NCAA tournament due to transition from Division II

The 2024 WAC women's basketball tournament is the postseason women's basketball tournament of the Western Athletic Conference (WAC) for the 2023–24 season. The conference tournament is scheduled to be played from March 13–16, 2024 at the Orleans Arena in Paradise, Nevada near Las Vegas. Basketball seating capacity at the Orleans Arena is 7,471. The winner of the conference tournament will receive the conference's automatic bid to the NCAA tournament.

== Seeds ==
Eight of the eleven members are invited to the tournament. The field for the WAC tournament has varied from six to last year's twelve qualifiers. While Tarleton and Utah Tech are ineligible for the NCAA tournament, they are eligible for the WAC tournament. If a team that is not eligible for the NCAA Tournament wins the WAC Tournament, the conference's automatic bid will go to the highest seeded tournament-eligible team. As was the case for the 2023 tournament, teams will be seeded based on the WAC Resume Seeding System. While seeding is determined by the WAC Resume Seeding System, the eight teams invited to the tournament will be determined by composite WAC standings.

Seed	School	Conference record	WAC Resume Seeding points (final)
1	California Baptist	18–2	7.428
2	Grand Canyon	16–4	4.809
3	Stephen F. Austin	14–6	1.399
4	Utah Tech	12–8	-1.756
5	UT Arlington	11–9	-1.915
6	Abilene Christian	10–10	-5.055
7	Tarleton	7–13	-7.960
8	Southern Utah	6–14	-9.030
DNQ	Seattle	6–14	-10.551
DNQ	UT Rio Grande Valley	5–15	-10.419
DNQ	Utah Valley	5–15	-8.108

== Schedule ==
Session	Game	Time*	Matchup^{#}	Score	Television
First round – Wednesday, March 13, 2024 – Orleans Arena
1	1	12:00 pm	No. 5 UT Arlington vs. No. 8 Southern Utah	67–53	ESPN+
1	2	2:30 pm	No. 6 Abilene Christian vs. No. 7 Tarleton	41–54	ESPN+
Quarterfinals – Thursday, March 14, 2024 – Orleans Arena
2	3	12:00 pm	No. 5 UT Arlington vs. No. 4 Utah Tech	72–57	ESPN+
2	4	2:30 pm	No. 7 Tarleton vs. No. 3 Stephen F. Austin	70–58	ESPN+
Semifinals – Friday, March 15, 2024 – Orleans Arena
3	5	12:00 pm	No. 5 UT Arlington vs. No. 1 California Baptist	67–83	ESPN+
3	6	2:30 pm	No. 3 Stephen F. Austin vs. No. 2 Grand Canyon	66–63	ESPN+
Championship – Saturday, March 16, 2024 – Orleans Arena
4	7	10:30 am	No. 3 Stephen F. Austin vs. No. 1 California Baptist	74–75	ESPNU
*Game times in PT. #-Rankings denote tournament seeding.

== Bracket ==
First round Wednesday, March 13
5	UT Arlington	67
8	Southern Utah	53
6	Abilene Christian	41
7	Tarleton	54

Quarterfinals; Thursday, March 14
4	Utah Tech	57
5	UT Arlington	72
3	Stephen F. Austin	70
7	Tarleton	58

Semifinals; Friday, March 15
1	California Baptist	83
5	UT Arlington	67
2	Grand Canyon	63
3	Stephen F. Austin	66

Championship; Saturday, March 16
1	California Baptist	75
2	Stephen F. Austin	74

* denotes overtime period

== Awards ==
Award	Player	Team
Most Outstanding Player	Chloe Webb	California Baptist Lancers

== See also ==
- 2024 WAC men's basketball tournament
