= Seattle Redhawks women's basketball =

College women's basketball team

2026–27 Seattle Redhawks women's basketball team
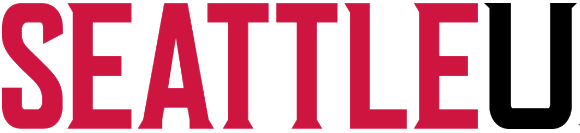
- University: Seattle University
- Head coach: John Bonner (1st season)
- Location: Seattle, Washington
- Arena: Redhawk Center (capacity: 999)
- Conference: West Coast Conference
- Nickname: Redhawks
- Colors: Red and white

NCAA Division I tournament appearances
- 2018

Conference tournament champions
- 2018

Conference regular-season champions
- 2013

Uniforms
Home	Away

The Seattle Redhawks women's basketball is the women's basketball team representing Seattle University. They compete in the West Coast Conference.

== History ==
The Redhawks returned to NCAA play the same as the athletic program, joining the WAC in 2012. They won the regular season title in 2013, though they lost in the conference tournament title game, losing 67–64 to Idaho. They were invited to the WNIT, their first ever postseason appearance in history. They lost 68–51 in the 2013 Women's National Invitation Tournament to Saint Mary's in the first round. The following year, in 2014, they lost again in the conference tournament title game 75–67 to Idaho.

In 2017, coach Suzy Barcomb, in her first year as Redhawks Head coach, led Seattle to a second-place finish in the WAC regular season. They would fall to the regular season champs, New Mexico State, in the tournament championship final. Seattle qualified for an invitation to the WNIT, losing in the first round to Wyoming.

In 2018, Seattle earned their first WAC tournament championship, upsetting 2-seed Cal State Bakersfield as a 4-seed 57–54. The win came with an automatic-bid to the NCAA tournament, a first berth for the Redhawks women's program.

== Postseason ==
=== NCAA Division I ===
The Redhawks have made the NCAA Division I women's basketball tournament once. Their record is 0–1.

Year	Seed	Round	Opponent	Result
2018	15	First Round	(2) Oregon	L 45–88

=== WNIT ===
Seattle has appeared in the Women's National Invitation Tournament twice, going 0–2.

Year	Round	Opponent	Result
2013	First Round	Saint Mary's	L 51–68
2017	First Round	Wyoming	L 52–68

=== NAIA Division I ===
The Redhawks made one appearance in the NAIA Division I women's basketball tournament, with a combined record of 0–1.

Year	Seed	Round	Opponent	Result
1993	NR	First Round	#5 St. Edward's (TX)	L 69–71
