= Southern Utah Thunderbirds women's basketball =

College sports team in Cedar City, Utah, United States

2025–26 Southern Utah Thunderbirds women's basketball team
- University: Southern Utah University
- Head coach: Tracy Mason (8th season)
- Location: Cedar City, Utah
- Arena: America First Event Center (capacity: 5,300)
- Conference: Big Sky
- Nickname: Thunderbirds
- Colors: Scarlet and white

NCAA Division I tournament appearances
- 2023

Conference tournament champions
- 2023

Conference regular-season champions
- 2023

Uniforms
Home	Away	Alternate

The Southern Utah Thunderbirds women's basketball team is the women's basketball team that represents Southern Utah University in Cedar City, Utah. They currently compete in the Big Sky Conference.

== History ==
Southern Utah began play in 1975. Southern Utah won their first conference tournament title in 2023 in the Western Athletic Conference.

== Postseason ==
=== NCAA Division I ===
The Thunderbirds have made one appearance in the NCAA Division I women's basketball tournament, with a combined record of 0–1.

Year	Seed	Round	Opponent	Result
2023	#13	First Round	#3 Notre Dame	L 56–82

=== NAIA Division I ===
The Thunderbirds made one appearance in the NAIA Women's Basketball Championships, with a combined record of 0–1.

Year	Round	Opponent	Result
1988	First Round	#3 Arkansas Tech	L 50–62
