= 2023 WAC women's basketball tournament =

Postseason men's basketball tournament

- Classification: Division I
- Season: 2022–23
- Teams: 12
- Site: Michelob Ultra Arena (first round); Orleans Arena (all other games); Paradise, Nevada
- Champions: Southern Utah (1st title)
- Winning coach: Tracy Sanders (1st title)
- Television: ESPN+

2022–23 WAC women's basketball standings
	Conf.				Overall
Team	W		L	PCT	W		L	PCT
Southern Utah†	16	–	2	.889	23	–	10	.697
Stephen F. Austin	15	–	3	.833	26	–	6	.813
California Baptist	13	–	5	.722	22	–	13	.629
Grand Canyon	12	–	6	.667	21	–	10	.677
Utah Tech*	10	–	8	.556	19	–	12	.613
New Mexico State	10	–	8	.556	18	–	17	.514
Abilene Christian	9	–	9	.500	15	–	15	.500
UT Arlington	8	–	10	.444	14	–	17	.452
Sam Houston	8	–	10	.444	13	–	17	.433
UT Rio Grande Valley	6	–	12	.333	12	–	18	.400
Seattle	5	–	13	.278	6	–	24	.200
Utah Valley	3	–	15	.167	6	–	24	.200
Tarleton*	2	–	16	.111	8	–	21	.276
† 2023 WAC tournament winner * Ineligible for the 2023 NCAA tournament due to transition from Division II; As of March 18, 2023

The 2023 WAC women's basketball tournament is the postseason women's basketball tournament of the Western Athletic Conference (WAC) for the 2022–23 season. The conference tournament was scheduled to be played from March 7–11, 2023, at Michelob ULTRA Arena and the Orleans Arena in Paradise, Nevada near Las Vegas. The first round was played on March 6 at Michelob ULTRA Arena with the remaining rounds March 8–11 at the Orleans Arena. The winner of the conference tournament received the conference's automatic bid to the NCAA tournament.

== Seeds ==
Twelve of the thirteen members were invited to the tournament. While Tarleton and Utah Tech were ineligible for the NCAA tournament, they were eligible for the WAC tournament. The WAC Resume Seeding rankings are an advanced analytic developed by Ken Pomeroy that incorporates the performance of teams in both conference and non-conference games. Rankings were initially released on December 5. While seedings were determined using the WAC Resume Seeding System, the top 12 teams that qualified for the tournament were determined based on conference league records.

Seed	Feb. 27	Final
1	Stephen F. Austin	Stephen F. Austin
2	Southern Utah	Southern Utah
3	Grand Canyon	Grand Canyon
4	California Baptist	California Baptist
5	Utah Tech	Utah Tech
6	UT Arlington	UT Arlington
7	Sam Houston State	New Mexico State
8	New Mexico State	Abilene Christian
9	Abilene Christian	Sam Houston State
10	UT - RGV	UT - RGV
11	Seattle	Tarleton State
12	Tarleton State	Seattle
13	Utah Valley	Utah Valley

== Schedule ==
Session	Game	Time*	Matchup^{#}	Score	Television	Attendance
First round – Monday, March 6, 2023 – Michelob ULTRA Arena
1	1	12:00pm	No. 8 Abilene Christian vs. No. 9 Sam Houston	81–82	ESPN+	
1	2	2:00pm	No. 5 Utah Tech vs. No. 12 Utah Valley	72–68	ESPN+	
1	3	6:00pm	No. 7 New Mexico State vs. No. 10 UT Rio Grande Valley	65–49	ESPN+	
1	4	8:00pm	No. 6 UT Arlington vs. No. 11 Seattle	78–80	ESPN+	
Quarterfinals – Wednesday, March 8, 2023 – Orleans Arena
2	5	12:00pm	No. 1 Stephen F. Austin vs. No. 9 Sam Houston	74–59	ESPN+	
2	6	2:00pm	No. 4 California Baptist vs. No. 5 Utah Tech	81–72	ESPN+	
2	7	6:00pm	No. 2 Southern Utah vs. No. 7 New Mexico State	62–61	ESPN+	
2	8	8:00pm	No. 3 Grand Canyon vs. No. 11 Seattle	85–80	ESPN+	
Semifinals – Friday, March 10, 2023 – Orleans Arena
3	9	12:00 pm	No. 1 Stephen F. Austin vs. No. 4 California Baptist	64–69	ESPN+	
3	10	2:30pm	No. 2 Southern Utah vs. No. 3 Grand Canyon	64–51	ESPN+	
Championship – Saturday, March 11, 2023 – Orleans Arena
4	11	3:30pm	No. 4 California Baptist vs. No. 2 Southern Utah	73-82	ESPN+	
*Game times in PT. #-Rankings denote tournament seeding.

== Bracket ==
First round Monday, March 6 Michelob ULTRA Arena; ESPN+
8	Abilene Christian	81
9	Sam Houston	82
5	Utah Tech	72
12	Utah Valley	68
7	New Mexico State	65
10	UT Rio Grande Valley	49
6	UT Arlington	78
11	Seattle	80

Quarterfinals; Wednesday, March 8 Orleans Arena; ESPN+
1	Stephen F. Austin	74
9	Sam Houston	59
4	California Baptist	81
5	Utah Tech	72
2	Southern Utah	62
7	New Mexico State	61
3	Grand Canyon	85
11	Seattle	80

Semifinals; Friday, March 10; Orleans Arena; ESPN+
1	Stephen F. Austin	64
4	California Baptist	69
2	Southern Utah	64
3	Grand Canyon	51

Championship; Saturday, March 11; Orleans Arena; ESPN2
4	California Baptist	73
2	Southern Utah	82

== See also ==
- 2023 WAC men's basketball tournament
