= Wisdom Gymnasium =

American university sports arena

- Interactive map of Wisdom Gymnasium
- Location: W Vanderbilt St., Stephenville, Texas 76401
- Coordinates: 32.215438°N 98.220617°W
- Capacity: 3,000
- Surface: Hardwood

Construction
- Cost: $1.3 million

Tenant
- Tarleton State Texans

Wisdom Gymnasium is a 3,000 seat multi-purpose arena in Stephenville, Texas. It was built in 1970. It is the home of the Tarleton State University Texans basketball teams and volleyball team. Wisdom Gymnasium is named for long-time Tarleton athletics director and coach W.J. Wisdom.

The gym often holds FFA contests, college tours, freshman transitioning week activities, graduation, homecoming activities, and workshops. The gym also serves as a building for kinesiology classes.

The final basketball game was played at Wisdom Gymnasium on March 8, 2025, a 71–66 loss to Utah Valley. The men's and women's basketball teams moved to the new EECU Center on campus for the 2025–26 season. Volleyball games will still be played at Wisdom Gymnasium.

== See also ==
- List of NCAA Division I basketball arenas
