= Redhawk Center =

University fitness center

Coordinates: 47°36′26″N 122°18′48″W

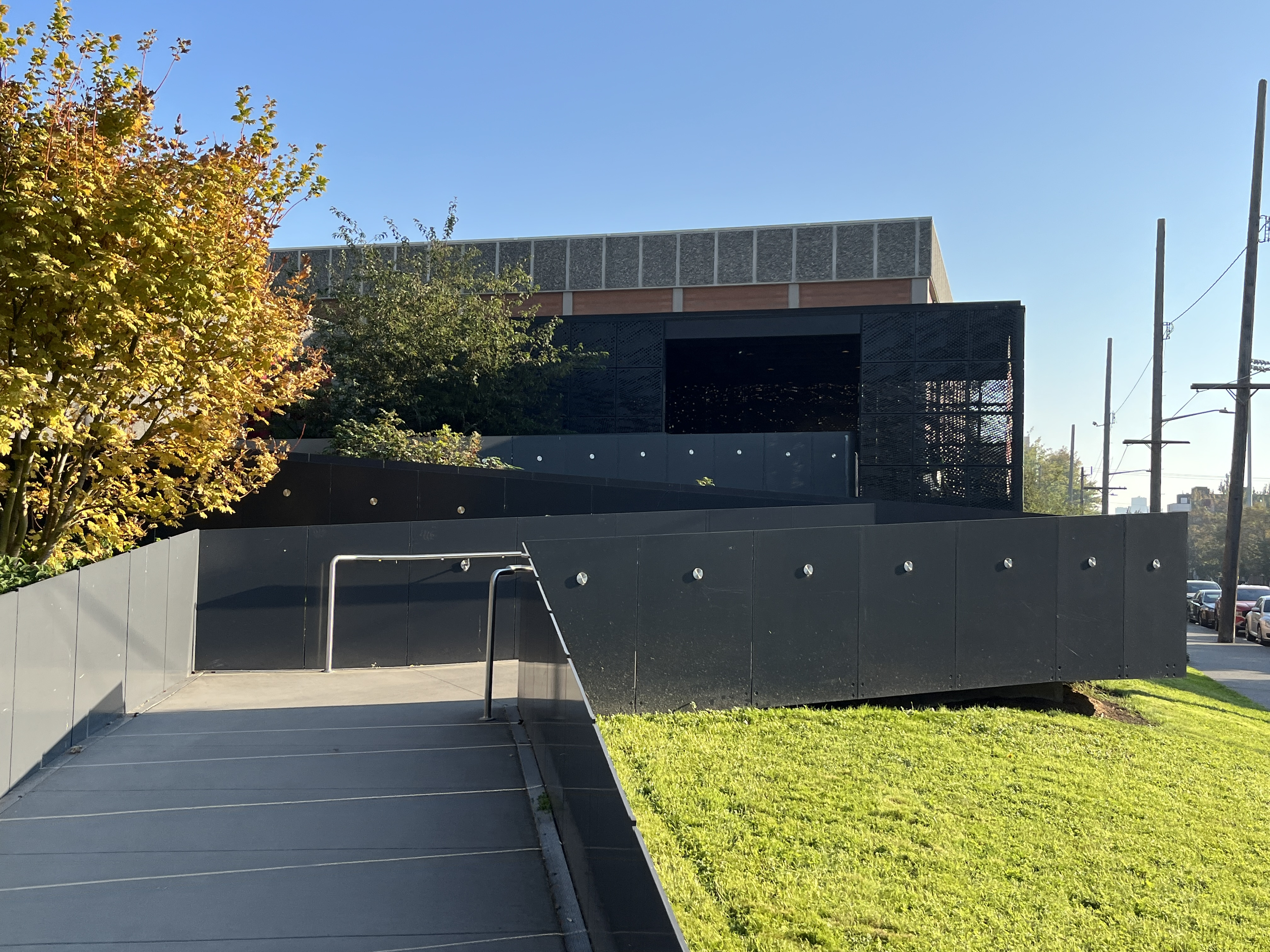
- Exterior view in 2022
- Interactive map of Redhawk Center
- Address: Seattle, Washington; United States
- Capacity: 999

Redhawk Center is a 999-seat multi-purpose arena in Seattle, Washington on the campus of Seattle University. It was built in 1959 and is home to the Seattle University Redhawks women's basketball and volleyball teams, as well as the home court for the Redhawks men's team, which also plays at nearby Climate Pledge Arena since 2008 when the school returned to NCAA Division I.

== History ==
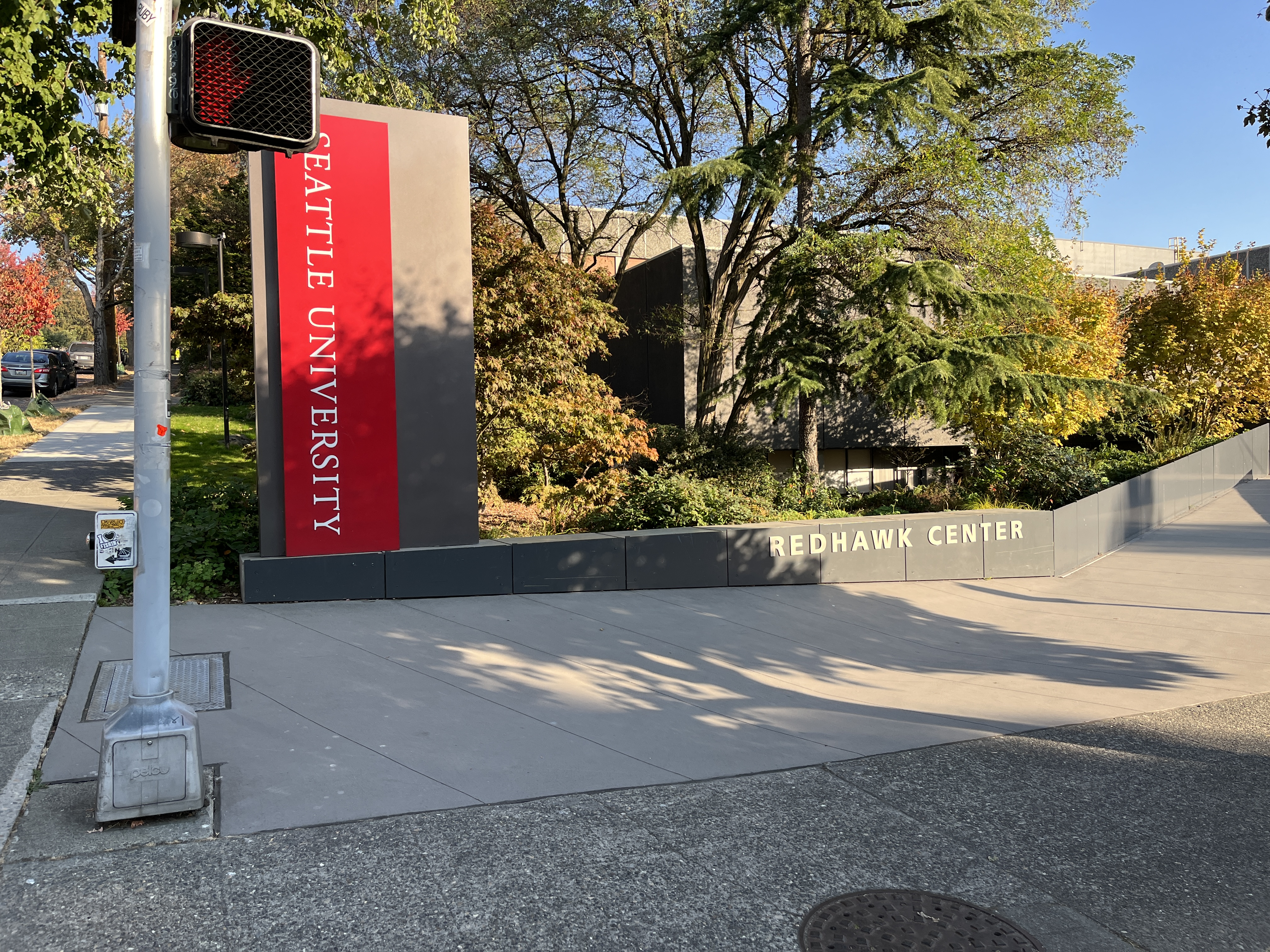
Exterior, 2022

On December 15, 2014, the men's team returned for the first time since 2008, for a single game against Northwest University, which Seattle won. The Redhawk Center was also used for College Basketball Invitational games in mid-March in 2015 and 2016.

The arena underwent a major remodel for the 2014–15 season, with new seating, court, and more.

Starting in 2016, the men's team will play six regular season games at the Redhawk Center, with possible plans for even more home games in the future here. The school cites the change to getting more student involvement, a more intimate home setting, the success of hosting CBI games here the last two years, and the lack of attendance at KeyArena.

From 2018 until 2021, Seattle U played all home games at the Redhawk Center while KeyArena underwent a major renovation.

== Connolly Center name change ==
In 2018, the school renamed the Connolly Center to its current name. Originally named for Archbishop Thomas Connolly, the school removed his name due to Connolly's involvement in covering up sex crimes committed by a parish priest, Father Michael Cody. Connolly died in 1991.
