= 2023–24 UTEP Miners women's basketball team =

American college basketball season

2023–24 UTEP Miners women's basketball
- Conference: Conference USA
- Record: 12–19 (6–10 C-USA)
- Head coach: Keitha Adams (1st, 17th overall season)
- Associate head coach: Ewa Laskowska
- Assistant coaches: Jareica Hughes; Lulu McKinney
- Home arena: Don Haskins Center

2023–24 Conference USA women's basketball standings
	Conf.				Overall
Team	W		L	PCT	W		L	PCT
Middle Tennessee †	16	–	0	1.000	30	–	5	.857
Liberty	11	–	5	.688	18	–	16	.529
FIU	11	–	5	.688	21	–	12	.636
Louisiana Tech	7	–	9	.438	14	–	19	.424
Jacksonville State	7	–	9	.438	12	–	17	.414
New Mexico State	6	–	10	.375	13	–	18	.419
Western Kentucky	6	–	10	.375	15	–	17	.469
UTEP	6	–	10	.375	12	–	19	.387
Sam Houston	2	–	14	.125	7	–	22	.241
† 2024 CUSA tournament winner

The 2023–24 UTEP Miners women's basketball team represented the University of Texas at El Paso during the 2023–24 NCAA Division I women's basketball season. The Miners, led by Keitha Adams in the first season of her second stint as head coach, and 17th season overall, played their home games at the Don Haskins Center in El Paso, Texas as a member of Conference USA.

== Previous season ==
The Miners finished the 2022–23 season 20–12, 12–8 in C-USA play to finish in a tie for fourth place. As the #4 seed in the C-USA tournament, they defeated #5 seed Louisiana Tech in the quarterfinals, before falling to top-seeded and eventual tournament champions Middle Tennessee in the semifinals. They received an at-large bid into the WNIT, where they would lose in the first round to Texas Tech.

On April 5, 2023, head coach Kevin Baker announced his resignation, after six years at the helm. On April 11, 2023, it was announced that Wichita State head coach Keitha Adams, who coached the Miners from 2001 to 2017, would be returning as the team's next head coach.

== Roster ==
2023–24 UTEP Miners women's basketball team
Players
Coaches

Pos.	#	Name	Height	Year	Previous school	Hometown
G	0	Mahri Petree	6 ft 0 in (1.83 m)	Sr	Bradley	Detroit, Michigan
G	1	D'Arrah Allen	5 ft 8 in (1.73 m)	Jr	Seward County Community College	Los Angeles, California
G	2	Erin Wilson	5 ft 10 in (1.78 m)	Sr	Jacksonville	Auburndale, Florida
G	3	Ivane Tensaie	5 ft 7 in (1.7 m)	Jr	Penn State	Roseville, Minnesota
G	4	Veonce Powell	5 ft 7 in (1.7 m)	RS So	Tyler Junior College	Miami, Florida
G	5	Delma Zita	5 ft 8 in (1.73 m)	Jr	New Mexico Junior College	Maputo, Mozambique
G	10	Zhane Thompson	5 ft 8 in (1.73 m)	RS So	Seward County Community College	Burnsville, Minnesota
G	11	Aaliyah Stanton	5 ft 5 in (1.65 m)	Fr	Rancho Christian High School	San Diego, California
G	12	Aspen Salazar	5 ft 9 in (1.75 m)	Fr	Centennial High School	Las Cruces, New Mexico
F	13	Dunja Zecevic	6 ft 1 in (1.85 m)	Fr	Sportska Gimnazija	Belgrade, Serbia
G	20	Thelma Barbitch	5 ft 10 in (1.78 m)	Fr	Centre National d'Education a Distance	Paris, France
F	22	Mariama Sow	6 ft 3 in (1.91 m)	Jr	New Mexico Junior College	Thiès, Senegal
F	23	Luisa Vydrova	6 ft 1 in (1.85 m)	Fr	Gymnázium Nad Štolou	Prague, Czech Republic
F	24	Adhel Tac	6 ft 0 in (1.83 m)	Jr	TCU	Garland, Texas
F	35	Jane Asinde	6 ft 2 in (1.88 m)	Sr	Wichita State	Kampala, Uganda

Head coach

- Keitha Adams (Southwestern College)

Assistant coach(es)

- Ewa Laskowska (Kansas State)
- Jareica Hughes (UTEP)
- Lulu McKinney (UTEP)

Legend

- (C) Team captain
- (S) Suspended
- (I) Ineligible
- (W) Walk-on
- Injured
- Current redshirt

Roster
Last update: January 30, 2024

== Schedule and results ==
Date time, TV	Rank^{#}	Opponent^{#}	Result	Record	High points	High rebounds	High assists	Site (attendance) city, state
Exhibition
October 28, 2023*; 2:00 pm		New Mexico Highlands	W 73–55	–	14 – Tac	10 – Tac	2 – 5 Tied	Don Haskins Center (1,507); El Paso, TX
Non-conference regular season
November 6, 2023*; 4:00 pm, ESPN+		Western New Mexico	W 75–58	1–0	16 – Petree	7 – Tac	4 – Zita	Don Haskins Center (1,007); El Paso, TX
November 11, 2023*; 4:00 pm, ESPN+		Kansas City	W 62–60	2–0	24 – Asinde	14 – Asinde	7 – Zita	Don Haskins Center (1,093); El Paso, TX
November 14, 2023*; 7:00 pm, ESPN+		Texas A&M–Kingsville	W 63–55	3–0	26 – Asinde	14 – Wilson	4 – Zita	Don Haskins Center (939); El Paso, TX
November 18, 2023*; 12:00 pm, ESPN+		at California Baptist	L 87–90 ^{OT}	3–1	19 – Asinde	13 – Asinde	9 – Zita	Fowler Events Center (314); Riverside, CA
November 22, 2023*; 11:00 am		vs. Lamar; St. Pete Showcase	L 44–56	3–2	10 – Wilson	7 – 2 Tied	4 – Zita	McArthur Center (212); St. Petersburg, FL
November 23, 2023*; 11:00 am		vs. TCU; St. Pete Showcase	L 56–85	3–3	18 – Asinde	8 – Asinde	2 – 2 Tied	McArthur Center (253); St. Petersburg, FL
November 26, 2023*; 2:00 pm, ESPN+		North Alabama	W 95–88	4–3	26 – Wilson	11 – Wilson	3 – 2 Tied	Don Haskins Center (1,111); El Paso, TX
November 30, 2023*; 7:00 pm, ESPN+		Colorado State	L 59–66	4–4	21 – Petree	14 – Asinde	4 – Wilson	Don Haskins Center (1,487); El Paso, TX
December 3, 2023*; 11:00 am, ESPN+		at UTSA	L 66–90	4–5	17 – Stanton	4 – Tac	3 – 3 Tied	Convocation Center (926); San Antonio, TX
December 9, 2023*; 2:00 pm, ESPN+		Portland	L 63–68 ^{OT}	4–6	22 – Tac	10 – 2 Tied	3 – Zita	Don Haskins Center (1,221); El Paso, TX
December 20, 2023*; 9:00 am		vs. UIC; West Palm Beach Classic	L 65–81	4–7	13 – Petree	9 – Wilson	3 – 2 Tied	Rubin Arena (62); West Palm Beach, FL
December 21, 2023*; 11:15 am, FloHoops		vs. Illinois; West Palm Beach Classic	L 71–81	4–8	20 – Asinde	6 – Asinde	6 – Asinde	Massimino Court; West Palm Beach, FL
December 30, 2023*; 2:00 pm, ESPN+		Southern Utah	W 89–62	5–8	21 – Asinde	16 – Wilson	4 – Asinde	Don Haskins Center (1,307); El Paso, TX
C-USA regular season
January 6, 2024; 2:00 pm, ESPN+		New Mexico State; Battle of I-10	W 81–72	6–8 (1–0)	19 – Asinde	11 – Asinde	6 – Zita	Don Haskins Center (1,939); El Paso, TX
January 13, 2024; 12:30 pm, ESPN+		FIU	L 62–83	6–9 (1–1)	19 – Petree	11 – Wilson	4 – Petree	Don Haskins Center (978); El Paso, TX
January 18, 2024; 4:00 pm, ESPN+		at Middle Tennessee	L 70–81	6–10 (1–2)	28 – Asinde	15 – Wilson	2 – 2 Tied	Murphy Center (3,313); Murfreesboro, TN
January 20, 2024; 11:00 am, ESPN+		at Western Kentucky	L 65–66	6–11 (1–3)	19 – Asinde	14 – Asinde	4 – Zita	E. A. Diddle Arena (1,013); Bowling Green, KY
January 25, 2024; 7:00 pm, ESPN+		Louisiana Tech	W 61–57	7–11 (2–3)	15 – Petree	10 – Wilson	3 – Petree	Don Haskins Center (1,010); El Paso, TX
January 27, 2024; 2:00 pm, ESPN+		Sam Houston	W 66–61	8–11 (3–3)	16 – Asinde	13 – Asinde	4 – 2 Tied	Don Haskins Center (1,435); El Paso, TX
February 1, 2024; 5:30 pm, ESPN+		at Jacksonville State	L 62–70	8–12 (3–4)	21 – Asinde	16 – Asinde	7 – Zita	Pete Mathews Coliseum (1,025); Jacksonville, AL
February 3, 2024; 11:00 am, ESPN+		at Liberty	L 68–87	8–13 (3–5)	25 – Asinde	7 – Asinde	2 – 2 Tied	Liberty Arena (842); Lynchburg, VA
February 10, 2024; 2:00 pm, ESPN+		at New Mexico State; Battle of I-10	L 59–66	8–14 (3–6)	18 – Petree	8 – Wilson	4 – Stanton	Pan American Center (1,357); Las Cruces, NM
February 15, 2024; 7:00 pm, ESPN+		Western Kentucky	W 73–68	9–14 (4–6)	24 – Wilson	14 – Asinde	7 – Zita	Don Haskins Center (974); El Paso, TX
February 17, 2024; 1:00 pm, ESPN+		Middle Tennessee	L 41–56	9–15 (4–7)	11 – Stanton	11 – Asinde	2 – Asinde	Don Haskins Center (1,411); El Paso, TX
February 22, 2024; 5:00 pm, ESPN+		at Louisiana Tech	L 69–85	9–16 (4–8)	19 – Asinde	9 – Asinde	3 – Petree	Thomas Assembly Center (1,546); Ruston, LA
February 24, 2024; 1:00 pm, ESPN+		at Sam Houston	W 82–66	10–16 (5–8)	22 – Asinde	14 – Asinde	4 – 3 Tied	Bernard Johnson Coliseum (570); Huntsville, TX
February 29, 2024; 7:00 pm, ESPN+		Jacksonville State	W 70–48	11–16 (6–8)	16 – Zita	9 – Wilson	3 – Tensaie	Don Haskins Center (1,215); El Paso, TX
March 2, 2024; 1:00 pm, ESPN+		Liberty	L 63–80	11–17 (6–9)	18 – Asinde	9 – Asinde	3 – Asinde	Don Haskins Center (1,155); El Paso, TX
March 7, 2024; 5:00 pm, ESPN+		at FIU	L 62–88	11–18 (6–10)	28 – Asinde	10 – Asinde	5 – Zita	Ocean Bank Convocation Center (444); Miami, FL
C-USA tournament
March 12, 2024; 4:30 pm, ESPN+	(8)	vs. (9) Sam Houston; First Round	W 78–64	12–18	19 – Vydrova	8 – Petree	7 – Zita	Von Braun Center (227); Huntsville, AL
March 13, 2024; 10:30 am, ESPN+	(8)	vs. (1) Middle Tennessee; Quarterfinals	L 50–78	12–19	14 – 2 Tied	8 – Petree	2 – 4 Tied	Von Braun Center (570); Huntsville, AL
*Non-conference game. ^{#}Rankings from AP Poll. (#) Tournament seedings in parentheses. All times are in Mountain.
