= Keitha Adams =

American college basketball coach

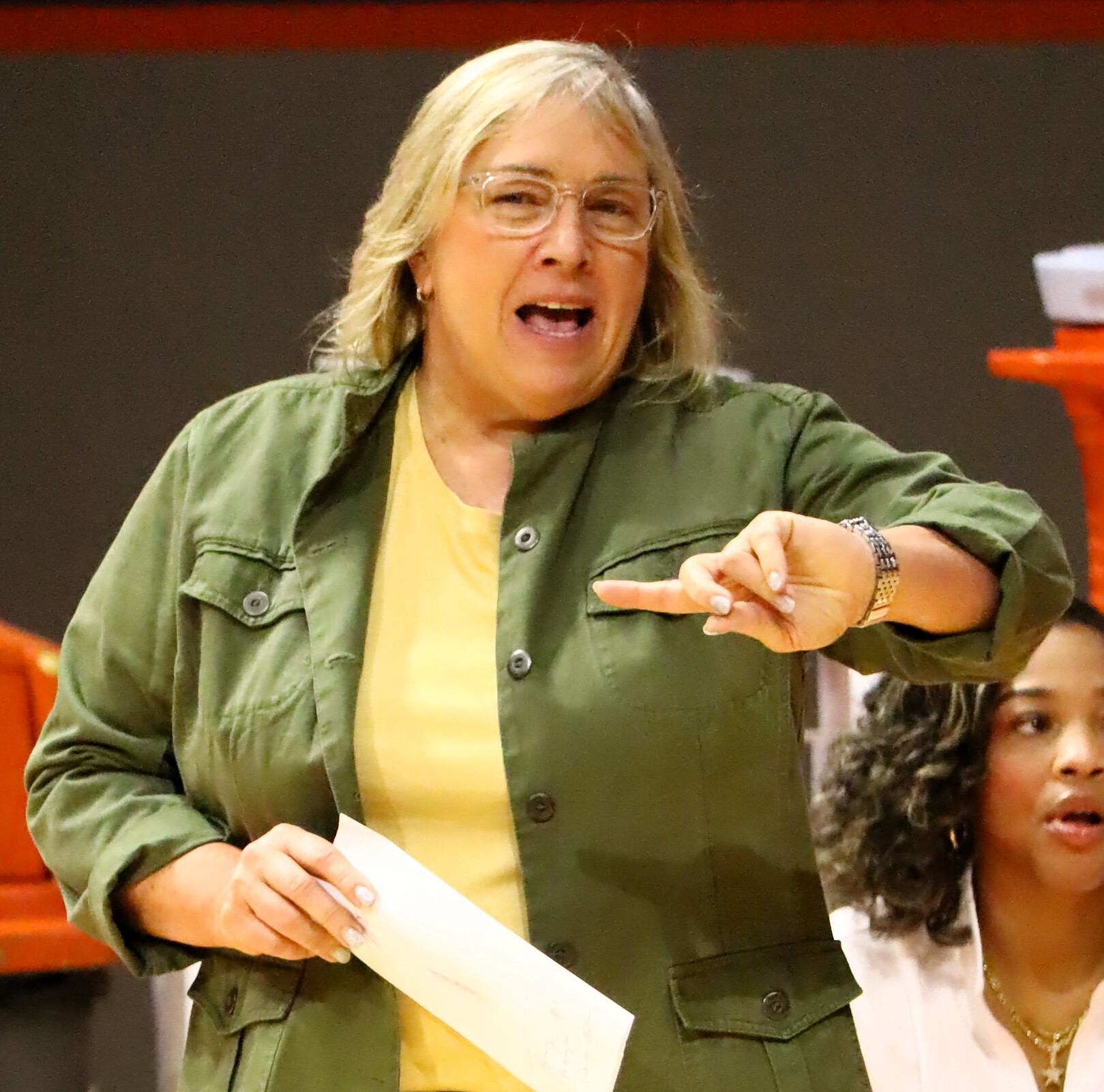
- Adams with UTEP in 2025

Current position
- Title: Head coach
- Team: UTEP
- Conference: Mountain West
- Record: 320–264 (.548)

Biographical details
- Born: February 13, 1967 (age 59); Oxford, Kansas
- Education: Southwestern College

Coaching career (HC unless noted)
- 1987–1989: Belle Plaine HS (asst.)
- 1991–1994: Winfield HS
- 1994–1996: Independence CC (asst.)
- 1996–2001: Independence CC
- 2001–2017: UTEP
- 2017–2023: Wichita State
- 2023–present: UTEP

Head coaching record
- Overall: 400–357 (.528) (college); 127–37 (.774) (junior college)
- Tournaments: 1–2 (NCAA); 8–2 (WNIT)

Keitha Rachelle Adams (née Green; born February 13, 1967) is an American college basketball coach who is currently the head women's basketball coach at UTEP.

Prior to the 2006–07 season, Adams was known as Keitha Green.

== Coaching career ==
Adams began her coaching career in 1987 as a girls' basketball assistant coach at Belle Plaine High School in Belle Plaine, Kansas while studying at Southwestern College, from which she would ultimately graduate in 1989. After graduating from Southwestern, Adams joined Winfield High School in Winfield, Kansas and coached softball, volleyball, and track before ultimately settling on basketball full-time in 1991.

In 1994, Adams became a women's basketball assistant coach at Independence Community College; she was also a men's and women's tennis coach in the 1994–95 season. Independence promoted Adams to head coach in 1996. In five seasons as head coach, Adams had a cumulative 127–37 record and two Kansas Jayhawk Community College Conference titles in 2000 and 2001.

=== UTEP (2001–2017) ===
The University of Texas at El Paso (UTEP) hired Adams as head women's basketball coach on April 20, 2001. Adams coached at UTEP for 16 seasons and accumulated a 284–209 record, three Conference USA regular season titles (2008, 2012, 2016), one C-USA Tournament title (2012), two NCAA tournament appearances (2008 and 2012), and two WNIT appearances (2014 and 2016)—the only such titles and postseason bids in program history.

Following a 24–7 season in 2013–14 and appearance in the 2014 WNIT, UTEP signed Adams to a six-year contract extension.

In her final season as head coach, UTEP went 8–23 season in 2016–17.

At UTEP, Adams created a mentorship program that helped ensure a high graduation rate among her players. Adams is credited with building a successful women's basketball program that also "encourages interaction between players and fans." She was inducted into the El Paso Women's Hall of Fame in 2010. In 2016, she was recognized as the Conference USA Coach of the Year.

=== Wichita State (2017–2023) ===
Adams resigned from UTEP to become head coach at Wichita State on March 29, 2017.

=== UTEP (2023–present) ===
In 2023, Adams returned as head coach for UTEP.

== Head coaching record ==
The following table shows Adams' head coaching record at the NCAA Division I level. Source:

Record table
Season	Team	Overall	Conference	Standing	Postseason
UTEP Miners (Western Athletic Conference) (2001–2005)
2001–02	UTEP	3–25	1–17	10th	
2002–03	UTEP	10–19	5–13	9th	
2003–04	UTEP	16–13	10–8	4th	
2004–05	UTEP	12–17	7–11	T–7th	
UTEP (WAC):		41–74 (.357)	23–49 (.319)		
UTEP Miners (Conference USA) (2005–2017)
2005–06	UTEP	14–15	6–10	T–7th	
2006–07	UTEP	22–8	10–6	T–4th	
2007–08	UTEP	28–4	16–0	1st	NCAA second round
2008–09	UTEP	18–12	11–5	2nd	
2009–10	UTEP	16–16	6–10	10th	
2010–11	UTEP	16–14	7–9	9th	
2011–12	UTEP	29–4	15–1	1st	NCAA first round
2012–13	UTEP	22–10	8–8	5th	
2013–14	UTEP	29–8	12–4	3rd	WNIT Runner-up
2014–15	UTEP	12–16	7–11	11th	
2015–16	UTEP	29–5	16–2	1st	WNIT Quarterfinals
2016–17	UTEP	8–23	5–13	T–11th	
Wichita State Shockers (American Athletic Conference) (2017–2023)
2017–18	Wichita State	14–17	9–7	T-5th	
2018–19	Wichita State	12–18	5–11	T-8th	
2019–20	Wichita State	16–15	7–9	T-6th	
2020–21	Wichita State	6–12	2–9	9th	
2021–22	Wichita State	14–16	5–11	9th	
2022–23	Wichita State	18–15	6–10	T-8th	
Wichita State:		80–93 (.462)	34–57 (.374)		
UTEP Miners (Conference USA) (2023–2026)
2023–24	UTEP	12–19	6–10	T–6th	
2024–25	UTEP	11–19	4–14	T–9th	
2025–26	UTEP	13–17	5–13	T–10th	
UTEP Miners (Mountain West) (2026–present)
2026-27	UTEP				
UTEP (C-USA):		279–190 (.595)	134–116 (.536)		
Total:		400–357 (.528)			
National champion Postseason invitational champion Conference regular season champion Conference regular season and conference tournament champion Division regular season champion Division regular season and conference tournament champion Conference tournament champion
