= Conference USA Championship Game =

The title Conference-USA Championship Game may refer to several sporting events that are sponsored by the Conference USA.

- Conference USA Football Championship Game crowns the champion of the C-USA football season.
- Conference USA men's basketball tournament crowns the champion of the C-USA men's basketball season.
- Conference USA women's basketball tournament crowns the champion of the C-USA women's basketball season.
