= Conference USA basketball tournament =

The phrase Conference USA basketball tournament may refer to:

- Conference USA men's basketball tournament
- Conference USA women's basketball tournament
