= 2023–24 Louisiana Tech Lady Techsters basketball team =

American college basketball season

2023–24 Louisiana Tech Lady Techsters basketball
- Conference: Conference USA
- Record: 14–19 (7–9 CUSA)
- Head coach: Brooke Stoehr (8th season)
- Associate head coach: Nitra Perry
- Assistant coaches: Scott Stoehr; Tez Dumars
- Home arena: Thomas Assembly Center

2023–24 Conference USA women's basketball standings
	Conf.				Overall
Team	W		L	PCT	W		L	PCT
Middle Tennessee †	16	–	0	1.000	30	–	5	.857
Liberty	11	–	5	.688	18	–	16	.529
FIU	11	–	5	.688	21	–	12	.636
Louisiana Tech	7	–	9	.438	14	–	19	.424
Jacksonville State	7	–	9	.438	12	–	17	.414
New Mexico State	6	–	10	.375	13	–	18	.419
Western Kentucky	6	–	10	.375	15	–	17	.469
UTEP	6	–	10	.375	12	–	19	.387
Sam Houston	2	–	14	.125	7	–	22	.241
† 2024 CUSA tournament winner

The 2023–24 Louisiana Tech Lady Techsters basketball team represented Louisiana Tech University during the 2023–24 NCAA Division I women's basketball season. The team was led by eighth-year head coach Brooke Stoehr, and played their home games at the Thomas Assembly Center in Ruston, Louisiana as a member of Conference USA (C-USA).

== Previous season ==
The Lady Techsters finished the 2022–23 season 19–13, 12–8 in C-USA play, and won the C-USA West Division regular-season title. They played in the quarterfinal round of the C-USA tournament, losing to UTEP. They were invited to the WNIT, where they lost in the opening round to Arkansas.

== Roster ==
2023–24 Louisiana Tech Lady Techsters women's basketball team
Players
Coaches

Pos.	#	Name	Height	Year	Previous school	Hometown
G/F	0	Evie Goetz	6 ft 1 in (1.85 m)	RS So	Guyer High School; TCU	Denton, TX
G	1	Autumn Smith	5 ft 6 in (1.68 m)	Jr	Martin High School	Arlington, TX
G	3	Robyn Lee	5 ft 8 in (1.73 m)	Jr	Moss Point High School	Moss Point, MS
G	4	Paris Guillory	5 ft 7 in (1.7 m)	Fr	St. Louis Catholic High School	Lake Charles, LA
G	10	Salma Bates	5 ft 7 in (1.7 m)	Sr	John Curtis High School; Tulane	Kenner, LA
G	22	Jianna Morris	5 ft 7 in (1.7 m)	Fr	Sylvan Hills High School	Sherwood, AR
G	23	Silvia Nativi	6 ft 0 in (1.83 m)	Jr	Benedetto Varchi	Ferrara, Italy
G	24	Amaya Brannon	5 ft 11 in (1.8 m)	Jr	Plano Senior High School	Plano, TX
F	32	Kate Thompson	6 ft 2 in (1.88 m)	Jr	Denham Springs High School; Wisconsin	Denham Springs, LA
F	33	Mackenzie Wurm	6 ft 4 in (1.93 m)	Jr	Allen High School	Allen, TX
F	34	Ayen Angoi	6 ft 0 in (1.83 m)	RS So	Bishop Lynch High School	Dallas, TX
F	44	Anna Larr Roberson	6 ft 3 in (1.91 m)	Sr	Cedar Creek School	Ruston, LA
G	45	Anja Bukvic	5 ft 10 in (1.78 m)	So	V Economic School	Belgrade, Serbia

Head coach

- Brooke Stoehr (Louisiana Tech)

Assistant coach(es)

- Nitra Perry (Mississippi State)
- Scott Stoehr (North Texas)
- Tez Dumars (West Texas A&M)

Legend

- (C) Team captain
- (S) Suspended
- (I) Ineligible
- (W) Walk-on
- Injured
- Current redshirt

Roster
Last update: September 18, 2024

== Schedule and results ==
Date time, TV	Rank^{#}	Opponent^{#}	Result	Record	Site (attendance) city, state
Non-conference regular season
November 6, 2023*; 6:00 p.m., ESPN+		LSU–Alexandria	W 93–37	1–0	Thomas Assembly Center (1,144); Ruston, LA
November 9, 2023*; 11:30 a.m., ESPN+		Louisiana Christian	W 88–52	2–0	Thomas Assembly Center (3,521); Ruston, LA
November 19, 2023*; 2:00 p.m., LHN		at No. 11 Texas	L 44–96	2–1	Moody Center (5,532); Austin, TX
November 24, 2023*; 2:00 p.m., ESPN+		vs. Drake; Drake Thanksgiving Invitational	L 66–77	2-2	Knapp Center (1,734); Des Moines, IA
November 25, 2023*; 11:30 a.m., ESPN+		vs. Maine; Drake Thanksgiving Invitational	L 54–60	2–3	Knapp Center (1,505); Des Moines, IA
November 26, 2023*; 11:30 a.m., ESPN+		vs. Richmond; Drake Thanksgiving Invitational	L 56–83	2–4	Knapp Center (580); Des Moines, IA
November 29, 2023*; 6:00 p.m., ESPN+		Louisiana–Monroe	L 52–60	2–5	Thomas Assembly Center (1,744); Ruston, LA
December 3, 2023*; 1:00 p.m., SECN+		at Vanderbilt	L 63–71	2–6	Memorial Gymnasium (1,829); Nashville, TN
December 7, 2023*; 7:00 p.m., SECN+		at Arkansas	L 60–100	2–7	Bud Walton Arena (2,599); Fayetteville, AR
December 9, 2023*; 12:00 p.m., ESPN+		at Arkansas State	L 58–69	2–8	First National Bank Arena; Jonesboro, AR
December 14, 2023*; 6:00 p.m., ESPN+		SMU	L 53–69	2–9	Thomas Assembly Center (1,655); Ruston, LA
December 16, 2023*; 2:00 p.m., ESPN+		Alcorn State	W 49–47	3–9	Thomas Assembly Center (1,712); Ruston, LA
December 18, 2023*; 6:00 p.m., ESPN+		Cal Baptist	W 77–51	4–9	Thomas Assembly Center (1,527); Ruston, LA
December 21, 2023*; 1:00 p.m., ESPN+		at South Alabama	W 68–34	5–9	Mitchell Center; Mobile, AL
December 30, 2023*; 1:00 p.m., ESPN+		at Abilene Christian	W 66–49	6–9	Moody Coliseum (1,281); Abilene, TX
C-USA regular season
January 6, 2024; 2:00 p.m., ESPN+		Sam Houston	W 66–62	7–9 (1–0)	Thomas Assembly Center (1,863); Ruston, LA
January 10, 2024; 6:00 p.m., ESPN+		Middle Tennessee	L 61–64 ^{OT}	7–10 (1–1)	Thomas Assembly Center (1,632); Ruston, LA
January 13, 2024; 1:00 p.m., ESPN+		at Liberty	L 59–66	7–11 (1–2)	Liberty Arena (1,008); Lynchburg, VA
January 20, 2024; 2:00 p.m., ESPN+		Jacksonville State	W 67–53	8–11 (2–2)	Thomas Assembly Center (1,690); Ruston, LA
January 25, 2024; 8:00 p.m., ESPN+		at UTEP	L 57–61	8–12 (2–3)	Don Haskins Center (1,010); El Paso, TX
January 27, 2024; 1:00 p.m., ESPN+		at New Mexico State	L 64–66	8–13 (2–4)	Pan American Center (909); Las Cruces, NM
February 1, 2024; 6:00 p.m., ESPN+		FIU	L 71–73	8–14 (2–5)	Thomas Assembly Center (1,902); Ruston, LA
February 7, 2024; 6:30 p.m., ESPN+		at Western Kentucky	L 56–64	8–15 (2–6)	E. A. Diddle Arena (930); Bowling Green, KY
February 10, 2024; 2:00 p.m., ESPN+		Liberty	L 53–58	8–16 (2–7)	Thomas Assembly Center (1,604); Ruston, LA
February 15, 2024; 6:30 p.m., ESPN+		at Jacksonville State	W 61–51	9–16 (3–7)	Pete Mathews Coliseum (1,015); Jacksonville, AL
February 17, 2024; 12:00 p.m., ESPN+		at FIU	L 51–68	9–17 (3–8)	Ocean Bank Convocation Center (419); Miami, FL
February 22, 2024; 6:00 p.m., ESPN+		UTEP	W 85–69	10–17 (4–8)	Thomas Assembly Center (1,546); Ruston, LA
February 24, 2024; 2:00 p.m., ESPN+		New Mexico State	W 70–63	11–17 (5–8)	Thomas Assembly Center (1,775); Ruston, LA
February 28, 2024; 6:00 p.m., ESPN+		Western Kentucky	W 45–41	12–17 (6–8)	Thomas Assembly Center (1,564); Ruston, LA
March 6, 2024; 6:30 p.m., ESPN+		at Sam Houston	W 71–57	13–17 (7–8)	Bernard Johnson Coliseum (491); Huntsville, TX
March 9, 2024; 9:30 a.m., ESPN+		at Middle Tennessee	L 58–79	13–18 (7–9)	Murphy Center (4,227); Murfreesboro, TN
C-USA tournament
March 14, 2024; 11:30 a.m., ESPN+	(4)	vs. (5) Jacksonville State; Quarterfinals	W 60–54	14–18	Von Braun Center (2,157); Huntsville, AL
March 15, 2024; 5:30 p.m., ESPN+	(4)	vs. (1) Middle Tennessee; Semifinals	L 56–62	14–19	Von Braun Center (2,701); Huntsville, AL
*Non-conference game. ^{#}Rankings from AP poll. (#) Tournament seedings in parentheses. All times are in Central.

== See also ==
- 2023–24 Louisiana Tech Bulldogs basketball team
- Louisiana Tech Lady Techsters basketball
