= 2023–24 Sam Houston Bearkats women's basketball team =

American college basketball season

2023–24 Sam Houston Bearkats women's basketball
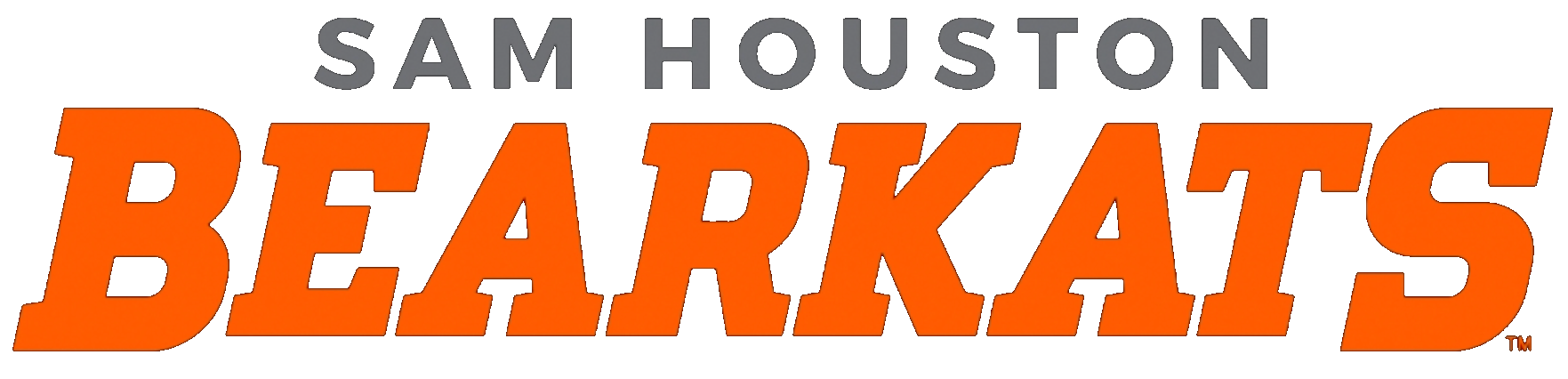
- Conference: Conference USA
- Record: 7–22 (2–14 C-USA)
- Head coach: Ravon Justice (5th season)
- Assistant coaches: Brittany Mason; Martin Pazanin; Simeon Burton
- Home arena: Bernard Johnson Coliseum

2023–24 Conference USA women's basketball standings
	Conf.				Overall
Team	W		L	PCT	W		L	PCT
Middle Tennessee †	16	–	0	1.000	30	–	5	.857
Liberty	11	–	5	.688	18	–	16	.529
FIU	11	–	5	.688	21	–	12	.636
Louisiana Tech	7	–	9	.438	14	–	19	.424
Jacksonville State	7	–	9	.438	12	–	17	.414
New Mexico State	6	–	10	.375	13	–	18	.419
Western Kentucky	6	–	10	.375	15	–	17	.469
UTEP	6	–	10	.375	12	–	19	.387
Sam Houston	2	–	14	.125	7	–	22	.241
† 2024 CUSA tournament winner

The 2023–24 Sam Houston Bearkats women's basketball team represented Sam Houston State University during the 2023–24 NCAA Division I women's basketball season. The Bearkats, led by fifth-year head coach Ravon Justice, played their home games at the Bernard Johnson Coliseum in Huntsville, Texas as first-year members of Conference USA.

== Previous season ==
The Bearkats finished the 2022–23 season 13–17, 8–10 in WAC play to finish in a tie for eighth place. As the #9 seed in the WAC tournament, they defeated #8 seed Abilene Christian in the first round, before falling to top-seeded Stephen F. Austin in the quarterfinals. This was the Bearkats' last season as members of the Western Athletic Conference, as they became members of Conference USA, effective July 1, 2023.

== Roster ==
2023–24 Sam Houston Bearkats women's basketball team
Players
Coaches

Pos.	#	Name	Height	Year	Previous school	Hometown
G	0	Sydnee Kemp	5 ft 5 in (1.65 m)	RS Jr	Lee's Summit West High School	Kansas City, Missouri
G	1	Kaila Kelley	5 ft 8 in (1.73 m)	Jr	Trinity Valley Community College	Cedar Hill, Texas
G	3	Kelis Grant	5 ft 7 in (1.7 m)	Fr	Cedar Hill High School	Cedar Hill, Texas
G	10	Kassidy Dixon	5 ft 10 in (1.78 m)	Jr	Eastern Arizona College	Goodyear, Arizona
G	11	Diana Rosenthal	5 ft 9 in (1.75 m)	GS	Prairie View A&M	St. Petersburg, Florida
F	12	Elena Houghton	6 ft 1 in (1.85 m)	So	Hartford	Washington, D.C.
F	13	Kaylee Jefferson	6 ft 0 in (1.83 m)	RS Sr	East Carolina	Sulphur Springs, Texas
F	14	Raanee Smith	6 ft 2 in (1.88 m)	Sr	Colorado	Philadelphia, Pennsylvania
G	15	Alexus Seaton	5 ft 10 in (1.78 m)	GS	UC Irvine	Fort Worth, Texas
G	22	Shanti Henry	5 ft 8 in (1.73 m)	Sr	Western Nebraska Community College	Wichita, Kansas
G	23	Bryana Block	5 ft 6 in (1.68 m)	So	Liberty-Eylau High School	Texarkana, Texas
G	25	Diarrah Sissoko	5 ft 10 in (1.78 m)	Jr	Grayson College	Bamako, Mali
G	32	Tamera Derrough	5 ft 2 in (1.57 m)	Jr	Southwestern Assemblies of God	Arlington, Texas

Head coach

- Ravon Justice (USAO)

Assistant coach(es)

- Brittany Mason (Houston)
- Martin Pazanin (Bradley)
- Simeon Burton (Sam Houston State)

Legend

- (C) Team captain
- (S) Suspended
- (I) Ineligible
- (W) Walk-on
- Injured
- Current redshirt

Roster
Last update: January 31, 2024

== Schedule and results ==
Date time, TV	Rank^{#}	Opponent^{#}	Result	Record	High points	High rebounds	High assists	Site (attendance) city, state
Non-conference regular season
November 11, 2023*; 2:00 pm, ESPN+		Houston Christian	W 67–65	1–0	14 – Kemp	13 – Smith	2 – 3 Tied	Bernard Johnson Coliseum (533); Huntsville, TX
November 14, 2023*; 7:00 pm, ESPN+		at Houston	L 65–106	1–1	20 – Kemp	8 – Smith	1 – 5 Tied	Fertitta Center (964); Houston, TX
November 17, 2023*; 6:30 pm, ESPN+		Schreiner	W 96–43	2–1	22 – Jefferson	12 – Smith	8 – Henry	Bernard Johnson Coliseum (416); Huntsville, TX
November 21, 2023*; 7:00 pm, ESPN+		at Texas State	W 66–62	3–1	19 – Rosenthal	11 – Smith	1 – 3 Tied	Strahan Arena (782); San Marcos, TX
November 25, 2023*; 4:00 pm, ESPN+		UTSA	L 56–63	3–2	14 – Kemp	9 – Jefferson	4 – Jefferson	Bernard Johnson Coliseum (235); Huntsville, TX
December 1, 2023*; 11:00 am, ESPN+		Florida A&M	W 65–62	4–2	15 – Jefferson	9 – Smith	4 – Jefferson	Bernard Johnson Coliseum (428); Huntsville, TX
December 5, 2023*; 6:00 pm, ESPN+		at Texas Tech	L 60–93	4–3	15 – Sissoko	6 – Smith	3 – 2 Tied	United Supermarkets Arena (4,069); Lubbock, TX
December 10, 2023*; 2:00 pm, ESPN+		Texas College	W 114–51	5–3	22 – Smith	16 – Smith	5 – Rosenthal	Bernard Johnson Coliseum (377); Huntsville, TX
December 16, 2023*; 2:00 pm, ESPN+		UT Arlington	L 65–76	5–4	15 – Rosenthal	7 – 3 Tied	4 – Kemp	Bernard Johnson Coliseum (407); Huntsville, TX
December 18, 2023*; 7:00 pm, ESPN+		at SMU	L 64–69	5–5	13 – 2 Tied	11 – Jefferson	4 – Dixon	Moody Coliseum (1,186); University Park, TX
December 21, 2023*; 3:00 pm, ESPN+		at Utah Valley	L 69–73 ^{OT}	5–6	14 – Smith	11 – 2 Tied	4 – Henry	UCCU Center (304); Orem, UT
December 30, 2023*; 2:00 pm, ESPN+		UT Rio Grande Valley	L 58–66	5–7	13 – Smith	11 – Smith	2 – 3 Tied	Bernard Johnson Coliseum (407); Huntsville, TX
C-USA regular season
January 6, 2024; 2:00 pm, ESPN+		at Louisiana Tech	L 62–66	5–8 (0–1)	17 – Rosenthal	11 – Smith	2 – 2 Tied	Thomas Assembly Center (1,863); Ruston, LA
January 10, 2024; 6:30 pm, ESPN+		at Western Kentucky	L 60–76	5–9 (0–2)	12 – Smith	9 – Smith	4 – Kemp	E. A. Diddle Arena (853); Bowling Green, KY
January 13, 2024; 2:00 pm, ESPN+		Middle Tennessee	L 55–87	5–10 (0–3)	18 – Jefferson	5 – Dixon	3 – 2 Tied	Bernard Johnson Coliseum (396); Huntsville, TX
January 20, 2024; 2:00 pm, ESPN+		Liberty	L 77–84	5–11 (0–4)	17 – Kemp	8 – Smith	4 – Kemp	Bernard Johnson Coliseum (481); Huntsville, TX
January 25, 2024; 7:00 pm, ESPN+		at New Mexico State	L 63–76	5–12 (0–5)	11 – Derrough	8 – Smith	2 – 2 Tied	Pan American Center (458); Las Cruces, NM
January 27, 2024; 3:00 pm, ESPN+		at UTEP	L 61–66	5–13 (0–6)	16 – Jefferson	7 – Houghton	4 – 2 Tied	Don Haskins Center (1,435); El Paso, TX
February 1, 2024; 6:30 pm, ESPN+		Western Kentucky	W 87–81	6–13 (1–6)	26 – Jefferson	12 – Smith	5 – 2 Tied	Bernard Johnson Coliseum (415); Huntsville, TX
February 3, 2024; 2:00 pm, ESPN+		FIU	L 65–71	6–14 (1–7)	17 – Dixon	8 – Dixon	2 – 3 Tied	Bernard Johnson Coliseum (510); Huntsville, TX
February 8, 2024; 6:30 pm, ESPN+		Jacksonville State	L 56–58	6–15 (1–8)	17 – Henry	9 – Smith	2 – 2 Tied	Bernard Johnson Coliseum (413); Huntsville, TX
February 15, 2024; 10:00 am, ESPN+		at FIU	L 49–64	6–16 (1–9)	9 – Derrough	10 – Smith	2 – Henry	Ocean Bank Convocation Center (2,084); Miami, FL
February 17, 2024; 1:00 pm, ESPN+		at Liberty	L 56–86	6–17 (1–10)	15 – Jefferson	10 – Smith	1 – 5 Tied	Liberty Arena (1,253); Lynchburg, VA
February 22, 2024; 6:30 pm, ESPN+		New Mexico State	W 66–56 ^{OT}	7–17 (2–10)	15 – Sissoko	19 – Smith	3 – 2 Tied	Bernard Johnson Coliseum (449); Huntsville, TX
February 24, 2024; 2:00 pm, ESPN+		UTEP	L 66–82	7–18 (2–11)	18 – 2 Tied	9 – Houghton	7 – Derrough	Bernard Johnson Coliseum (570); Huntsville, TX
March 2, 2024; 2:00 pm, ESPN+		at Middle Tennessee	L 62–93	7–19 (2–12)	18 – Jefferson	9 – Smith	4 – Smith	Murphy Center (3,712); Murfreesboro, TN
March 6, 2024; 6:30 pm, ESPN+		Louisiana Tech	L 57–71	7–20 (2–13)	15 – Henry	7 – Dixon	5 – Jefferson	Bernard Johnson Coliseum (491); Huntsville, TX
March 9, 2024; 2:30 pm, ESPN+		at Jacksonville State	L 70–74 ^{OT}	7–21 (2–14)	19 – Kemp	10 – Smith	3 – Kemp	Pete Mathews Coliseum (1,223); Jacksonville, AL
C-USA tournament
March 12, 2024; 5:30 pm, ESPN+	(9)	vs. (8) UTEP; First Round	L 64–78	7–22	19 – Henry	7 – Jefferson	6 – Seaton	Von Braun Center (227); Huntsville, AL
*Non-conference game. ^{#}Rankings from AP Poll. (#) Tournament seedings in parentheses. All times are in Central.
