= Conference USA women's basketball tournament =

- Conference basketball championship
- Sport: College basketball
- Conference: Conference USA
- Number of teams: 10 (as of 2024–25)
- Format: Single-elimination tournament
- Current stadium: Propst Arena
- Current location: Huntsville, Alabama
- Played: 1996–present
- Last contest: 2024
- Current champion: Middle Tennessee Blue Raiders (5)
- Most championships: Middle Tennessee Blue Raiders & Tulane Green Wave (5)
- Official website: ConferenceUSA.com

The Conference USA women's basketball tournament is held annually following the end of the regular season of NCAA Division I women's basketball.

The tournament has been played every year since the inception of Conference USA in 1996. The winner receives an automatic berth into the NCAA Division I women's basketball tournament.

== Tournament champions ==
Year	Champion	Score	Runner-up	Location	Tournament MVP
1996	Memphis	93–87 (OT)	DePaul	Bartow Arena, Birmingham, Alabama	Keeta Matthews, Memphis
1997	Tulane	76–53	Marquette	Alumni Hall, Chicago, Illinois	Mary Lowry, Tulane
1998	Memphis	79–75	Louisville	Louisville Gardens, Louisville, Kentucky	LaTonya Johnson, Memphis
1999	Tulane	58–44	Cincinnati	Fogelman Arena, New Orleans, Louisiana	Grace Daley, Tulane
2000	Tulane	73–70	UAB	Freedom Hall, Louisville, Kentucky	Janell Burse, Tulane
2001	Tulane	63–50	Cincinnati	U.S. Cellular Arena, Milwaukee, Wisconsin	Valerie King, Cincinnati
2002	Cincinnati	68–56	Tulane	DePaul Athletic Center, Chicago, Illinois	Valerie King, Cincinnati
2003	TCU	85–76 (OT)	Cincinnati	The Pyramid, Memphis, Tennessee	Sandora Irvin, TCU
2004	Houston	86–75	TCU	Daniel-Meyer Coliseum, Fort Worth, Texas	Chandi Jones, Houston
2005	TCU	60–41	Louisville	Dale F. Halton Arena, Charlotte, North Carolina	Sandora Irvin, TCU
2006	Tulsa	55–52	Rice	Moody Coliseum, Dallas, Texas	Jillian Robbins, Tulsa
2007	East Carolina	79–70	Rice	Reynolds Center, Tulsa, Oklahoma	LaCoya Terry, East Carolina
2008	SMU	73–57	UTEP	UCF Arena, Orlando, Florida	Janielle Dodds, SMU
2009	UCF	65–54 (OT)	Southern Miss	Fogelman Arena, New Orleans, Louisiana	Emma Cannon, UCF
2010	Tulane	62–54	UAB	Reynolds Center, Tulsa, Oklahoma	Danielle Nunn, Tulane
2011	UCF	85–73	Tulane	Don Haskins Center; Memorial Gym, El Paso, Texas	Jelisa Caldwell, UCF
2012	UTEP	69–65	Tulane	FedExForum; Elma Roane Fieldhouse, Memphis, Tennessee	Gloria Brown, UTEP
2013	Tulsa	75–66	UCF	BOK Center, Tulsa, Oklahoma	Taleya Mayberry, Tulsa
2014	Middle Tennessee	84–55	Tulsa	Don Haskins Center; Memorial Gym, El Paso, Texas	Ebony Rowe, Middle Tennessee
2015	Western Kentucky	60–57	Southern Miss	Legacy Arena, Birmingham, Alabama	Alexis Govan, Western Kentucky
2016	Middle Tennessee	70–54	Old Dominion	Legacy Arena, Birmingham, Alabama	Ty Petty, Middle Tennessee
2017	Western Kentucky	67–56	Southern Miss	Legacy Arena, Birmingham, Alabama	Kendall Noble, Western Kentucky
2018	Western Kentucky	72–57	UAB	The Ford Center at The Star, Frisco, Texas	Tashia Brown, Western Kentucky
2019	Rice	69–54	Middle Tennessee	The Ford Center at The Star, Frisco, Texas	Nancy Mulkey, Rice
2020	Canceled due to the COVID-19 pandemic				
2021	Middle Tennessee	68–65	Rice	The Ford Center at The Star, Frisco, Texas	Anastasia Hayes, Middle Tennessee
2022	Charlotte	68–63	Louisiana Tech	The Ford Center at The Star, Frisco, Texas	Octavia Jett-Wilson, Charlotte
2023	Middle Tennessee	82-70	Western Kentucky	The Ford Center at The Star, Frisco, Texas	Jalynn Gregory, Middle Tennessee
2024	Middle Tennessee	67–51	Liberty	Propst Arena, Huntsville, Alabama	Savannah Wheeler, Middle Tennessee
2025	Liberty	53-48	Middle Tennessee	Propst Arena, Huntsville, Alabama	
2026	Missouri State	43-38	Louisiana Tech	Propst Arena, Huntsville, Alabama	

== Tournament Championships by School ==
Members as of the 2025-2026 academic year. UTEP leaves on July 1, 2026.

School	Championships	Championship Years
Middle Tennessee	5	2014, 2016, 2021, 2023, 2024
Tulane	5	1997, 1999, 2000, 2001, 2010
Western Kentucky	3	2015, 2017, 2018
Memphis	2	1996, 1998
TCU	2	2003, 2005
Tulsa	2	2006, 2013
UCF	2	2009, 2011
Missouri State	1	2026
Liberty	1	2025
UTEP	1	2012
Charlotte	1	2022
Cincinnati	1	2002
East Carolina	1	2007
Houston	1	2004
Rice	1	2019
SMU	1	2008
FIU	0	
Jacksonville State	0	
Kennesaw State	0	
Louisiana Tech	0	
New Mexico State	0	
Sam Houston	0	
Delaware	0	

== See also ==
- Conference USA men's basketball tournament
