= 2023–24 Middle Tennessee Blue Raiders women's basketball team =

American college basketball season

2023–24 Middle Tennessee Blue Raiders women's basketball

Conference USA regular-season & tournament champions

NCAA tournament, second round
- Conference: Conference USA
- Record: 30–5 (16–0 C-USA)
- Head coach: Rick Insell (19th season)
- Associate head coach: Matt Insell
- Assistant coaches: Kim Brewton; Nina Davis; Tom Hodges; Shaun McKinney
- Home arena: Murphy Center

2023–24 Conference USA women's basketball standings
	Conf.				Overall
Team	W		L	PCT	W		L	PCT
Middle Tennessee †	16	–	0	1.000	30	–	5	.857
Liberty	11	–	5	.688	18	–	16	.529
FIU	11	–	5	.688	21	–	12	.636
Louisiana Tech	7	–	9	.438	14	–	19	.424
Jacksonville State	7	–	9	.438	12	–	17	.414
New Mexico State	6	–	10	.375	13	–	18	.419
Western Kentucky	6	–	10	.375	15	–	17	.469
UTEP	6	–	10	.375	12	–	19	.387
Sam Houston	2	–	14	.125	7	–	22	.241
† 2024 CUSA tournament winner

The 2023–24 Middle Tennessee Blue Raiders women's basketball team represented Middle Tennessee State University during the 2023–24 NCAA Division I women's basketball season. The Blue Raiders, led by 19th-year head coach Rick Insell, played their home games at Murphy Center in Murfreesboro, Tennessee as members of Conference USA (C-USA).

== Previous season ==
The Blue Raiders finished the 2022–23 season 28–5, 18–2 in C-USA play, to finish as C-USA regular-season champions. As the #1 seed in the C-USA tournament, they defeated #9 seed Charlotte in the quarterfinals, #4 seed UTEP in the semifinals, and #2 seed Western Kentucky to win the C-USA tournament championship to earn the conference's automatic bid into the NCAA tournament. They received the #11 seed in the Seattle Regional 4, where they lost to #6 region seed Colorado in the first round.

== Roster ==
2023–24 Middle Tennessee Blue Raiders women's basketball team
Players
Coaches

Pos.	#	Name	Height	Year	Previous school	Hometown
G	0	Sifa Ineza	5 ft 11 in (1.8 m)	RS So	FIU	Musanze, Rwanda
C	2	Anastasiia Boldyreva	6 ft 6 in (1.98 m)	Jr	Twice Named Hero of the Soviet Union	Moscow, Russia
G	3	Gracie Dodgen	5 ft 10 in (1.78 m)	RS So	White County High School	Sparta, TN
G	4	Savannah Wheeler	5 ft 6 in (1.68 m)	Sr	Marshall	Catlettsburg, KY
F	9	Dora Van Rijs	6 ft 0 in (1.83 m)	Fr	Obudai Arpad Gimnazium	Budapest, Hungary
G	10	Jalynn Gregory	5 ft 8 in (1.73 m)	Jr	Macon County High School	Lafayette, TN
G	12	Gracie Hamby	5 ft 8 in (1.73 m)	RS Fr	Blackman High School	Murfreesboro, TN
G	15	Ta'Mia Scott	6 ft 0 in (1.83 m)	So	Clarksville Northwest High School	Clarksville, TN
F	22	Jada Grannum	6 ft 3 in (1.91 m)	RS Jr	Lincoln Prep	Mississauga, ON
G	23	Jada Harrison	5 ft 8 in (1.73 m)	Fr	Westview High School	Martin, TN
G	31	Zahira Arizmendi Rubio	5 ft 8 in (1.73 m)	Fr	CB Leganés	Madrid, Spain
F	33	Courtney Whitson	6 ft 0 in (1.83 m)	GS	Dobyns-Bennett High School	Kingsport, TN
C	40	Meioshe Mason	6 ft 4 in (1.93 m)	RS Fr	Lebanon High School	Lebanon, TN
F	42	Stanislava Kabernick	6 ft 1 in (1.85 m)	Fr	Olympic Reserve School Number 1	Saint Petersburg, Russia
C	55	Iullia Grabovskaia	6 ft 5 in (1.96 m)	So	Rostov Regional School of Olympic Reserve	Rostov-on-Don, Russia

Head coach

- Rick Insell (Middle Tennessee)

Assistant coach(es)

- Matt Insell (Middle Tennessee)
- Kim Brewton (Liberty)
- Nina Davis (Baylor)
- Tom Hodges (Tennessee Tech)
- Shaun McKinney (Michigan State)

Legend

- (C) Team captain
- (S) Suspended
- (I) Ineligible
- (W) Walk-on
- Injured
- Current redshirt

Roster
Last update: January 27, 2024

== Season summary ==
Middle Tennessee relied heavily on their starters during the season, and five players—Savannah Wheeler, Courtney Whitson, Jalynn Gregory, Ta'Mia Scott and Anastasiia Boldyreva—appeared in all 35 games and played over 1,000 minutes. Wheeler led the team in scoring at 17.5 points per game and was named the C-USA Player of the Year. The Blue Raiders went 16–0 in the C-USA regular season to win the conference regular-season championship. They then won the conference tournament championship. In the NCAA tournament, they won their first-round game, their first NCAA tournament win since 2007. They lost in the second round. Middle Tennessee finished their season with an overall record of 30–5. It was their first 30-win season since 2006–07.

== Schedule and results ==
Date time, TV	Rank^{#}	Opponent^{#}	Result	Record	High points	High rebounds	High assists	Site (attendance) city, state
Exhibition
October 27, 2023*; 6:00 p.m.		UT Southern	W 97–44	–	–	–	–	Murphy Center; Murfreesboro, TN
October 30, 2023*; 6:30 p.m.		Cumberlands	W 103–53	–	24 – Boldyreva	8 – Boldyreva	10 – Wheeler	Murphy Center (2,004); Murfreesboro, TN
Non-conference regular season
November 6, 2023*; 5:00 p.m., ESPN+		Memphis	W 67–47	1–0	23 – Boldyreva	12 – Boldyreva	5 – Whitson	Murphy Center (3,505); Murfreesboro, TN
November 9, 2023*; 10:30 a.m., ESPN+		Florida A&M	W 93–48	2–0	23 – Wheeler	8 – Grabovskaia	6 – Wheeler	Murphy Center (6,000); Murfreesboro, TN
November 12, 2023*; 1:00 p.m., ESPN+		Princeton	L 60–65	2–1	21 – Gregory	7 – Whitson	3 – Whitson	Murphy Center (3,015); Murfreesboro, TN
November 18, 2023*; 4:00 p.m., FloHoops		vs. Michigan; Battle 4 Atlantis quarterfinals	L 49–63	2–2	23 – Boldyreva	7 – Boldyreva	5 – 2 tied	Imperial Arena (393); Nassau, Bahamas
November 19, 2023*; 6:30 p.m., FloHoops		vs. DePaul; Battle 4 Atlantis consolation 2nd round	W 71–69	3–2	20 – Scott	8 – 2 tied	7 – Wheeler	Imperial Arena (400); Nassau, Bahamas
November 20, 2023*; 4:00 p.m., FloHoops		vs. Memphis; Battle 4 Atlantis 5th-place game	W 64–57	4–2	25 – Boldyreva	13 – Boldyreva	5 – Wheeler	Imperial Arena (113); Nassau, Bahamas
November 26, 2023*; 1:00 p.m., ESPN+		at SIU Edwardsville	W 81–74	5–2	21 – Scott	7 – Grabovskaia	6 – Wheeler	First Community Arena (303); Edwardsville, IL
November 29, 2023*; 7:00 p.m., ESPN+		at Houston	W 70–45	6–2	22 – Wheeler	11 – Scott	9 – Wheeler	Fertitta Center (698); Houston, TX
December 3, 2023*; 2:00 p.m., ESPN+		at Belmont	L 57–71	6–3	20 – Scott	8 – Boldyreva	3 – 2 tied	Curb Event Center (1,365); Nashville, TN
December 6, 2023*; 6:30 p.m., ESPN+		vs. Tennessee	W 73–62	7–3	22 – Gregory	10 – Wheeler	4 – Whitson	Von Braun Center (5,015); Huntsville, AL
December 10, 2023*; 1:00 p.m., ESPN+		at Tennessee Tech	W 63–47	8–3	25 – Gregory	15 – Boldyreva	5 – Wheeler	Eblen Center (1,107); Cookeville, TN
December 17, 2023*; 2:00 p.m., ESPN+		Stephen F. Austin	W 72–47	9–3	25 – Wheeler	8 – Wheeler	5 – Gregory	Murphy Center (3,359); Murfreesboro, TN
December 20, 2023*; 6:30 p.m., ESPN+		Northern Kentucky	W 83–42	10–3	34 – Wheeler	10 – Scott	3 – 2 tied	Murphy Center (3,314); Murfreesboro, TN
December 30, 2023*; 3:00 p.m., ESPN+		at Grand Canyon	L 59–68	10–4	23 – Wheeler	8 – 2 tied	2 – 2 tied	Global Credit Union Arena (623); Phoenix, AZ
C-USA regular season
January 10, 2024; 6:00 p.m., ESPN+		at Louisiana Tech	W 64–61 ^{OT}	11–4 (1–0)	32 – Boldyreva	14 – Scott	2 – 2 tied	Thomas Assembly Center (1,632); Ruston, LA
January 13, 2024; 2:00 p.m., ESPN+		at Sam Houston	W 87–55	12–4 (2–0)	16 – Wheeler	10 – Boldyreva	7 – Wheeler	Bernard Johnson Coliseum (396); Huntsville, TX
January 18, 2024; 5:00 p.m., ESPN+		UTEP	W 81–70	13–4 (3–0)	18 – Wheeler	16 – Grabovskaia	4 – 2 tied	Murphy Center (3,313); Murfreesboro, TN
January 20, 2024; 2:00 p.m., ESPN+		New Mexico State	W 85–48	14–4 (4–0)	30 – Wheeler	10 – 2 tied	5 – Wheeler	Murphy Center (3,605); Murfreesboro, TN
January 24, 2024; 6:30 p.m., ESPN+		at Jacksonville State	W 67–45	15–4 (5–0)	27 – Boldyreva	15 – Boldyreva	4 – 2 tied	Pete Mathews Coliseum (1,024); Jacksonville, AL
January 27, 2024; 12:00 p.m., ESPN+		at FIU	W 92–62	16–4 (6–0)	26 – 2 tied	10 – Scott	11 – Wheeler	Ocean Bank Convocation Center (325); Miami, FL
February 3, 2024; 2:00 p.m., ESPN+		Western Kentucky	W 80–48	17–4 (7–0)	26 – Scott	15 – Whitson	7 – Wheeler	Murphy Center (4,806); Murfreesboro, TN
February 8, 2024; 6:30 p.m., ESPN+		Liberty	W 81–55	18–4 (8–0)	20 – Boldyreva	8 – Whitson	6 – Wheeler	Murphy Center (4,505); Murfreesboro, TN
February 10, 2024; 1:00 p.m., ESPN+		FIU	W 73–54	19–4 (9–0)	31 – Wheeler	7 – Boldyreva	11 – Wheeler	Murphy Center (4,428); Murfreesboro, TN
February 15, 2024; 7:00 p.m., ESPN+		at New Mexico State	W 73–37	20–4 (10–0)	27 – Wheeler	12 – Boldyreva	4 – Gregory	Pan American Center (1,045); Las Cruces, NM
February 17, 2024; 1:00 p.m., ESPN+		at UTEP	W 56–41	21–4 (11–0)	16 – Wheeler	9 – Boldyreva	4 – Wheeler	Don Haskins Center (1,411); El Paso, TX
February 21, 2024; 6:30 p.m., ESPN+		Jacksonville State	W 66–40	22–4 (12–0)	27 – Boldyreva	8 – Whitson	7 – Whitson	Murphy Center (3,613); Murfreesboro, TN
February 24, 2024; 11:00 a.m., ESPNU		at Western Kentucky	W 59–41	23–4 (13–0)	18 – Wheeler	14 – Boldyreva	4 – Boldyreva	E. A. Diddle Arena (2,015); Bowling Green, KY
March 2, 2024; 2:00 p.m., ESPN+		Sam Houston	W 93–62	24–4 (14–0)	26 – Scott	9 – Boldyreva	8 – Wheeler	Murphy Center (3,712); Murfreesboro, TN
March 6, 2024; 6:00 p.m., ESPN+		at Liberty	W 67–52	25–4 (15–0)	21 – Wheeler	9 – Boldyreva	7 – Wheeler	Liberty Arena (980); Lynchburg, VA
March 9, 2024; 9:30 a.m., ESPN+		Louisiana Tech	W 79–58	26–4 (16–0)	18 – 3 tied	13 – Blodyreva	9 – Wheeler	Murphy Center (4,227); Murfreesboro, TN
C-USA tournament
March 13, 2024; 11:30 a.m., ESPN+	(1)	vs. (8) UTEP; Quarterfinals	W 78–50	27–5	21 – Whitson	10 – Scott	6 – Wheeler	Von Braun Center (570); Huntsville, AL
March 15, 2024; 5:30 p.m., ESPN+	(1)	vs. (4) Louisiana Tech; Semifinals	W 62–56	28–4	22 – Wheeler	16 – Boldyreva	4 – Wheeler	Von Braun Center (2,701); Huntsville, AL
March 16, 2024; 4:30 p.m., CBSSN	(1)	vs. (2) Liberty; Championship	W 67–51	29–4	21 – Boldyreva	16 – tied	9 – Wheeler	Von Braun Center (4,301); Huntsville, AL
NCAA tournament
March 22, 2024*; 12:30 p.m., ESPN2	(11 A2)	vs. (6 A2) No. 23 Louisville; First round	W 71–69	30–4	24 – Gregory	12 – Boldyreva	4 – Gregory	Pete Maravich Assembly Center; Baton Rouge, LA
March 24, 2024*; 2:00 p.m., ABC	(11 A2)	at (3 A2) No. 8 LSU; Second round	L 56–83	30–5	21 – Wheeler	10 – tied	5 – Wheeler	Pete Maravich Assembly Center (12,632); Baton Rouge, LA
*Non-conference game. ^{#}Rankings from AP poll. (#) Tournament seedings in parentheses. A2=Albany 2. All times are in Central.
