= Rick Pietri =

American college basketball coach (born 1965)

Biographical details
- Born: July 6, 1965 (age 61)
- Education: South Alabama ('87)

Coaching career (HC unless noted)
- 1987–1989: St. Paul's HS (LA) (asst)
- 1989–1993: Spring Hill (asst)
- 1993–1994: Birmingham-Southern (asst)
- 1994–1998: B.C. Rain HS
- 1998–2000: St. Paul's HS (AL)
- 2000–2013: South Alabama
- 2013–2026: Jacksonville State

Head coaching record
- Overall: 417–355 (.540)

Accomplishments and honors

Championships
- 2× Sun Belt West Division (2003, 2004); ASUN West Division (2022)

Awards
- OVC Women's Basketball Coach of the Year (2014)

Rick Pietri (born July 6, 1965) is an American college basketball coach, who retired in 2026 as the women's head coach at Jacksonville State University. Prior to coaching the Jacksonville State Gamecocks, he coached at his alma mater for the University of South Alabama Jaguars from 2000 to 2013.

== Personal life ==
A graduate of De La Salle High School in New Orleans, Pietri has a bachelor's degree in communication and a master's degree in education from the University of South Alabama (USA). He is married to the former Suzanne Odom of Mobile, Alabama, and they are the parents of two.

== Coaching career ==
After graduating from South Alabama, where he was manager of the men's basketball team from 1983 to 1987, Pietri began his coaching career as an assistant at St. Paul's High School in Covington, Louisiana. He then spent four years as an assistant with the men's team at Spring Hill College in Mobile before moving to Birmingham and one season as an assistant for Birmingham–Southern College's successful men's NAIA program.

Pietri then became the boys' basketball head coach at B.C. Rain High School in Mobile, directing his team to the Alabama Final Four four years in a row, including the Alabama Class 5A state championship in 1997. After two season as boys' coach at St. Paul's High School in Mobile, Pieri was named women's coach at South Alabama, taking over leadership of a program that had gone through ten consecutive losing seasons.

In thirteen seasons at South Alabama, Pietri's Lady Jaguars had nine winning seasons, won the West division of the Sun Belt Conference twice and made two appearances in the Women's National Invitation Tournament. With a record of 220–167 and 111–104 in the Sun Belt, Pietri is the winningest coach in USA women's basketball. On March 13, 2013, Pietri was fired.

In his first year at Jacksonville State, Pietri led a program that had gone 5–52 (2–30 OVC) in its previous two years to a record of 14–18 (8–8 OVC) and a semi-final finish in the Ohio Valley Conference Tournament. He was also named 2013–14 Ohio Valley Conference Coach of the Year.

== Head coaching record ==
- Sun Belt Conference
- OVC 2017–18 Women's Basketball Standings
- JSU
- ASUN

Record table
Season	Team	Overall	Conference	Standing	Postseason
South Alabama Lady Jaguars (Sun Belt Conference) (2000–2013)
2000–01	South Alabama	13–16	5–11	5th (West)	
2001–02	South Alabama	17–11	7–8	3rd (West)	
2002–03	South Alabama	19–11	10–5	T–1st (West)	WNIT 1st round
2003–04	South Alabama	22–7	11–4	1st (West)	WNIT 1st round
2004–05	South Alabama	13–15	7–8	3rd (West)	
2005–06	South Alabama	15–14	8–7	4th (West)	
2006–07	South Alabama	14–16	7–11	4th (East)	
2007–08	South Alabama	20–11	10–8	3rd (East)	
2008–09	South Alabama	21–11	10–8	2nd (East)	
2009–10	South Alabama	15–16	9–9	5th (East)	
2010–11	South Alabama	17–13	8–8	4th (East)	
2011–12	South Alabama	17–13	9–7	4th (East)	
2012–13	South Alabama	17–13	10–10	4th (East)	
South Alabama:		220–167 (.568)	111–104 (.516)		
Jacksonville State Gamecocks (Ohio Valley Conference) (2013–2021)
2013–14	Jacksonville State	14–18	8–8	5th (East)	
2014–15	Jacksonville State	19–10	10–6	T–4th	
2015–16	Jacksonville State	10–18	5–11	10th	
2016–17	Jacksonville State	13–15	6–10	10th	
2017–18	Jacksonville State	19–12	12–6	T–4th	
2018–19	Jacksonville State	15–15	9–9	T–6th	
2019–20	Jacksonville State	14–16	10–8	T–5th	
2020–21	Jacksonville State	15–9	12–7	4th	
JSU Gamecocks (OVC):		119–113 (.513)	72–65 (.526)		
Jacksonville State Gamecocks (ASUN Conference) (2021–2023)
2021–22	Jacksonville State	24–8	13–3	1st (West)	WNIT First Round
2022–23	Jacksonville State	16–14	9–9	8th	
Jacksonville State (ASUN):		40–22 (.645)	22–12 (.647)		
Jacksonville State Gamecocks (Conference USA) (2023–2026)
2023–24	Jacksonville State	12–17	7–9	T–4th	
2024–25	Jacksonville State	10–20	4–14	T–9th	
2025–26	Jacksonville State	16–16	9–9	7th	
Jacksonville State (C–USA):		38–53 (.418)	20–32 (.385)		
Total:		417–355 (.540)			
National champion Postseason invitational champion Conference regular season champion Conference regular season and conference tournament champion Division regular season champion Division regular season and conference tournament champion Conference tournament champion
