= Memorial Gymnasium (University of Texas at El Paso) =

Multi-purpose arena in El Paso, Texas

Coordinates: 31.775519°N 106.504592°W

Memorial Gym is a 5,200-seat multi-purpose arena in El Paso, Texas. It opened in December 1961, replacing Holliday Hall, and was home to the Texas Western College Miners basketball teams, until the Don Haskins Center, then known as the Special Events Center, opened in 1977, by which time Texas Western had changed its name to the current University of Texas at El Paso. Memorial Gym was the home court of the 1966 Texas Western basketball team that won the NCAA title, using five black starters to defeat Adolph Rupp's all-white Kentucky squad.

Since 1974, Memorial Gym has been home to UTEP women's volleyball. Also in 1974, The Dillards and Elton John performed at Memorial Gym as part of a tour around the United States.

Memorial Gym hosted the first and second rounds of the 2011 Conference USA Women's basketball tournament.
