= 2023–24 Western Kentucky Lady Toppers basketball team =

American college basketball season

2023–24 Western Kentucky Lady Toppers basketball
- Conference: Conference USA
- Record: 15–17 (6–10 C-USA)
- Head coach: Greg Collins (6th season)
- Assistant coaches: Todd Buchanan; Ivy Woodcock; Temeka Johnson
- Home arena: E. A. Diddle Arena

2023–24 Conference USA women's basketball standings
	Conf.				Overall
Team	W		L	PCT	W		L	PCT
Middle Tennessee †	16	–	0	1.000	30	–	5	.857
Liberty	11	–	5	.688	18	–	16	.529
FIU	11	–	5	.688	21	–	12	.636
Louisiana Tech	7	–	9	.438	14	–	19	.424
Jacksonville State	7	–	9	.438	12	–	17	.414
New Mexico State	6	–	10	.375	13	–	18	.419
Western Kentucky	6	–	10	.375	15	–	17	.469
UTEP	6	–	10	.375	12	–	19	.387
Sam Houston	2	–	14	.125	7	–	22	.241
† 2024 CUSA tournament winner

The 2023–24 Western Kentucky Lady Toppers basketball team represented Western Kentucky University during the 2023–24 NCAA Division I women's basketball season. The Lady Toppers, led by sixth-year head coach Greg Collins, played their home games at E. A. Diddle Arena in Bowling Green, Kentucky as members of Conference USA (C-USA).

The Lady Toppers finished the season 15–17, 6–10 in C-USA play, to finish in a three-way tie for sixth place. They were defeated by eventual tournament runner-up Liberty in the quarterfinals of the C-USA tournament.

== Previous season ==
The Lady Toppers finished the 2022–23 season 19–14, 14–6 in C-USA play, to finish in second place. As the #2 seed in the C-USA tournament, they defeated #10 seed UAB in the quarterfinals, and #6 seed UTSA, before falling to top-seeded Middle Tennessee in the championship game. They received an automatic bid into the WNIT, where they lost to eventual champions Kansas in the first round.

== Roster ==
2023–24 Western Kentucky Lady Toppers women's basketball team
Players
Coaches

Pos.	#	Name	Height	Year	Previous school	Hometown
G	0	Mackenzie Chatfield	5 ft 9 in (1.75 m)	Fr	Westlake Girls High School	Auckland, New Zealand
G	1	Destiny Salary	6 ft 0 in (1.83 m)	Sr	Ole Miss	Jonesboro, AR
G	2	Aaliyah Pitts	6 ft 0 in (1.83 m)	Sr	Virginia	Suitland, MD
G	3	Alexis Mead	5 ft 5 in (1.65 m)	Jr	Martin Luther King High School	Moreno Valley, CA
G	4	Nevaeh Foster	5 ft 8 in (1.73 m)	Fr	Mishawaka Marian High School	South Bend, IN
G	10	Acacia Hayes	5 ft 8 in (1.73 m)	So	Riverdale High School	Murfreesboro, TN
F	13	Jailynn Brill	6 ft 3 in (1.91 m)	Fr	Lincoln High School	Lincoln, NE
G	14	Teresa Faustino	5 ft 9 in (1.75 m)	Sr	Oregon State	Barreiro, Portugal
F	21	Odeth Betancourt	6 ft 2 in (1.88 m)	Sr	South Florida	San Cristóbal, Venezuela
F	22	Caitlin Staley	6 ft 3 in (1.91 m)	Fr	Greenbrier High School	Augusta, GA
G	32	Karris Allen	5 ft 11 in (1.8 m)	So	Sikeston High School	Sikeston, MO
G	33	Josie Gilvin	6 ft 0 in (1.83 m)	So	Sacred Heart Academy	Louisville, KY

Head coach

- Greg Collins (Louisville)

Assistant coach(es)

- Todd Buchanan (Murray State)
- Ivy Woodcock (Western Kentucky)
- Temeka Johnson (LSU)

Legend

- (C) Team captain
- (S) Suspended
- (I) Ineligible
- (W) Walk-on
- Injured
- Current redshirt

Roster
Last update: January 29, 2024

== Schedule and results ==
Date time, TV	Rank^{#}	Opponent^{#}	Result	Record	High points	High rebounds	High assists	Site (attendance) city, state
Exhibition
October 31, 2023*; 6:00 p.m.		Lane	W 100–37	–	17 – Foster	7 – Pitts	4 – Mead	E. A. Diddle Arena (621); Bowling Green, KY
Non-conference regular season
November 6, 2023*; 5:00 p.m., ESPN+		Mercer	W 70–64	1–0	15 – Faustino	8 – Allen	6 – Mead	E. A. Diddle Arena (1,387); Bowling Green, KY
November 10, 2023*; 7:30 p.m., ESPN+		at Southern Utah	W 76–62	2–0	21 – Hayes	6 – Pitts	7 – Faustino	America First Event Center (653); Cedar City, UT
November 13, 2023*; 6:30 p.m., ESPN+		Cornell	W 62–56	3–0	18 – Hayes	6 – Allen	5 – Mead	E. A. Diddle Arena (1,032); Bowling Green, KY
November 15, 2023*; 6:30 p.m., SECN+		at Vanderbilt	L 74–77	3–1	23 – Mead	4 – 2 tied	6 – Mead	Memorial Gymnasium (1,642); Nashville, TN
November 18, 2023*; 12:00 p.m., ESPN+		at Miami (OH)	W 63–43	4–1	17 – Faustino	6 – 2 tied	6 – Mead	Millett Hall (357); Oxford, OH
November 21, 2023*; 11:00 a.m., ESPN+		Bucknell	W 63–45	5–1	18 – Hayes	7 – Mead	5 – Mead	E. A. Diddle Arena (2,214); Bowling Green, KY
November 24, 2023*; 10:00 a.m., FloHoops		vs. No. 16 Kansas State; Gulf Coast Showcase 1st round	L 61–77	5–2	29 – Hayes	5 – 2 tied	3 – Hayes	Hertz Arena (312); Estero, FL
November 25, 2023*; 10:00 a.m., FloHoops		vs. Vermont; Gulf Coast Showcase consolation 2nd round	W 62–50	6–2	18 – Hayes	9 – Mead	3 – 3 tied	Hertz Arena (313); Estero, FL
November 26, 2023*; 12:30 p.m., FloHoops		vs. Purdue Fort Wayne; Gulf Coast Showcase 5th-place game	L 77–90	6–3	24 – Mead	7 – Mead	3 – Faustino	Hertz Arena (213); Estero, FL
December 2, 2023*; 4:00 p.m.		at Oregon State	L 52–76	6–4	17 – Mead	4 – Pitts	2 – 2 tied	Gill Coliseum (3,528); Corvallis, OR
December 10, 2023*; 2:00 p.m., ESPN+		Ball State	L 59–67	6–5	22 – Hayes	8 – Allen	5 – Hayes	E. A. Diddle Arena (1,008); Bowling Green, KY
December 18, 2023*; 6:30 p.m., ESPN+		Abilene Christian	W 72–68	7–5	20 – Salary	6 – Pitts	5 – Mead	E. A. Diddle Arena (932); Bowling Green, KY
December 20, 2023*; 12:00 p.m.		vs. Nevada; Missouri State Classic	W 66–60	8–5	20 – Hayes	11 – Betancourt	5 – Faustino	Great Southern Bank Arena; Springfield, MO
December 21, 2023*; 2:30 p.m., ESPN+		at Missouri State; Missouri State Classic	L 68–69	8–6	23 – Hayes	7 – Allen	3 – Mead	Great Southern Bank Arena (1,674); Springfield, MO
December 29, 2023*; 6:30 p.m., ESPN+		West Virginia State	W 97–39	9–6	25 – Salary	10 – Pitts	8 – Faustino	E. A. Diddle Arena (1,216); Bowling Green, KY
C-USA regular season
January 6, 2024; 1:00 p.m., ESPN+		at Liberty	W 68–66	10–6 (1–0)	20 – Mead	7 – Mead	5 – Mead	Liberty Arena (724); Lynchburg, VA
January 10, 2024; 6:30 p.m., ESPN+		Sam Houston	W 76–60	11–6 (2–0)	19 – Salary	8 – 2 tied	8 – Mead	E. A. Diddle Arena (853); Bowling Green, KY
January 13, 2024; 2:30 p.m., ESPN+		at Jacksonville State	W 62–52	12–6 (3–0)	18 – Mead	6 – Salary	5 – Mead	Pete Mathews Coliseum (1,013); Jacksonville, AL
January 18, 2024; 6:30 p.m., ESPN+		New Mexico State	L 44–50	12–7 (3–1)	9 – 2 tied	7 – Betancourt	4 – Mead	E. A. Diddle Arena (782); Bowling Green, KY
January 20, 2024; 12:00 p.m., ESPN+		UTEP	W 66–65	13–7 (4–1)	25 – Salary	7 – Pitts	5 – Mead	E. A. Diddle Arena (1,013); Bowling Green, KY
January 25, 2024; 6:00 p.m., ESPN+		at FIU	L 60–70	13–8 (4–2)	18 – Salary	7 – Mead	4 – Mead	Ocean Bank Convocation Center (405); Miami, FL
February 1, 2024; 6:30 p.m., ESPN+		at Sam Houston	L 81–87	13–9 (4–3)	15 – Mead	10 – tied	3 – Hayes	Bernard Johnson Coliseum (415); Huntsville, TX
February 3, 2024; 2:00 p.m., ESPN+		at Middle Tennessee	L 48–80	13–10 (4–4)	17 – Salary	6 – Pitts	2 – Pitts	Murphy Center (4,806); Murfreesboro, TN
February 7, 2024; 6:30 p.m., ESPN+		Louisiana Tech	W 64–56	14–10 (5–4)	21 – Mead	8 – Mead	5 – Mead	E. A. Diddle Arena (930); Bowling Green, KY
February 10, 2024; 2:00 p.m., ESPN+		Jacksonville State	W 54–45	15–10 (6–4)	14 – Gilvin	9 – Pitts	3 – Mead	E. A. Diddle Arena (1,251); Bowling Green, KY
February 15, 2024; 8:00 p.m., ESPN+		at UTEP	L 68–73	15–11 (6–5)	20 – Mead	6 – Pitts	5 – Mead	Don Haskins Center (974); El Paso, TX
February 17, 2024; 3:00 p.m., ESPN+		at New Mexico State	L 61–64	15–12 (6–6)	17 – Mead	7 – Pitts	4 – Mead	Pan American Center (1,007); Las Cruces, NM
February 24, 2024; 11:00 a.m., ESPNU		Middle Tennessee	L 41–59	15–13 (6–7)	12 – Pitts	10 – Pitts	6 – Mead	E. A. Diddle Arena (2,015); Bowling Green, KY
February 28, 2024; 6:00 p.m., ESPN+		at Louisiana Tech	L 41–45	15–14 (6–8)	8 – tied	8 – tied	4 – Mead	Thomas Assembly Center (1,564); Ruston, LA
March 2, 2024; 1:00 p.m., ESPN+		FIU	L 68–71	15–15 (6–9)	18 – Faustino	6 – Betancourt	7 – Mead	E. A. Diddle Arena (1,153); Bowling Green, KY
March 9, 2024; 2:00 p.m., ESPN+		Liberty	L 77–84	15–16 (6–10)	15 – tied	6 – Betancourt	5 – Mead	E. A. Diddle Arena (1,613); Bowling Green, KY
C-USA tournament
March 13, 2024; 2:00 p.m., ESPN+	(7)	vs. (2) Liberty; Quarterfinals	L 59–62	15–17	22 – Salary	9 – Salary	5 – Mead	Von Braun Center (636); Huntsville, AL
*Non-conference game. ^{#}Rankings from AP poll. (#) Tournament seedings in parentheses. All times are in Central.
