= 2024 Conference USA women's basketball tournament =

- Classification: Division I
- Season: 2023–24
- Teams: 9
- Site: Propst Arena; Huntsville, Alabama
- Champions: Middle Tennessee (5th title)
- Winning coach: Rick Insell (5th title)
- MVP: Savannah Wheeler (Middle Tennessee)
- Television: ESPN+, CBSSN

2023–24 Conference USA women's basketball standings
	Conf.				Overall
Team	W		L	PCT	W		L	PCT
Middle Tennessee †	16	–	0	1.000	30	–	5	.857
Liberty	11	–	5	.688	18	–	16	.529
FIU	11	–	5	.688	21	–	12	.636
Louisiana Tech	7	–	9	.438	14	–	19	.424
Jacksonville State	7	–	9	.438	12	–	17	.414
New Mexico State	6	–	10	.375	13	–	18	.419
Western Kentucky	6	–	10	.375	15	–	17	.469
UTEP	6	–	10	.375	12	–	19	.387
Sam Houston	2	–	14	.125	7	–	22	.241
† 2024 CUSA tournament winner

The 2024 Conference USA women's basketball tournament was a postseason tournament held from March 12–16, 2024 at Propst Arena, part of the Von Braun Center in Huntsville, Alabama. All nine members of Conference USA (CUSA) participated in the tournament. Middle Tennessee, which finished the regular season undefeated in CUSA play, won the tournament and claimed CUSA's automatic bid to the NCAA tournament.

== Seeds ==
Teams were seeded by conference record. The top seven teams received byes to the quarterfinals.

Seed	School	Conference record	Tiebreaker
1	Middle Tennessee	16–0	
2	Liberty	11–5	3–1 vs. FIU/NMSU
3	FIU	11–5	2–2 vs. LIB/NMSU
4	Louisiana Tech	7–9	2–0 vs. JSU
5	Jacksonville State	7–9	0–2 vs. LT
6	New Mexico State	6–10	3–1 vs. WKU/UTEP
7	Western Kentucky	6–10	3–3 vs. NMSU/UTEP/LIB
8	UTEP	6–10	2–4 vs. WKU/NMSU/LIB
9	Sam Houston	2–14	

== Schedule ==
Game	Time	Matchup	Score	Television	Attendance
First round – March 12, 2024
1	5:30 pm	No. 8 UTEP vs. No. 9 Sam Houston	78–64	ESPN+	227
Quarterfinals – March 13, 2024
2	11:30 am	No. 1 Middle Tennessee vs. No. 8 UTEP	78–50	ESPN+	570
3	2:00 pm	No. 2 Liberty vs. No. 7 Western Kentucky	62–59	ESPN+	636
Quarterfinals – March 14, 2024
4	11:30 am	No. 4 Louisiana Tech vs. No. 5 Jacksonville State	60–54	ESPN+	2,157
5	2:00 pm	No. 3 FIU vs. No. 6 New Mexico State	58–63	ESPN+	2,029
Semifinals – March 15, 2024
6	5:30 pm	No. 1 Middle Tennessee vs. No. 4 Louisiana Tech	62–56	ESPN+	2,701
7	8:00 pm	No. 2 Liberty vs. No. 6 New Mexico State	82–70	ESPN+	2,157
Championship – March 16, 2024
8	4:30 pm	No. 1 Middle Tennessee vs No. 2 Liberty	67–51	CBSSN	4,301
*Game times in CT. ()-Rankings denote tournament seeding.

== Bracket ==
First round Tuesday, March 12
8	UTEP	78
9	Sam Houston	64

Quarterfinals; Wednesday, March 13; Thursday, March 14
1	Middle Tennessee	75
8	UTEP	50
4	Louisiana Tech	60
5	Jacksonville State	53
2	Liberty	62
7	Western Kentucky	59
3	FIU	58
6	New Mexico State	63

Semifinals; Friday, March 15
1	Middle Tennessee	62
4	Louisiana Tech	56
2	Liberty	82
6	New Mexico State	70

Championship; Saturday, March 16
1	Middle Tennessee	67
2	Liberty	51

* – Denotes overtime period

== See also ==
- 2024 Conference USA men's basketball tournament
- Conference USA women's basketball tournament
- Conference USA
