= 2023–24 Jacksonville State Gamecocks women's basketball team =

American college basketball season

2023–24 Jacksonville State Gamecocks women's basketball
- Conference: Conference USA
- Record: 12–17 (7–9 C-USA)
- Head coach: Rick Pietri (11th season)
- Assistant coaches: Destiny Thomas; Ka'Vonne Towns; Eric Wise
- Home arena: Pete Mathews Coliseum

2023–24 Conference USA women's basketball standings
	Conf.				Overall
Team	W		L	PCT	W		L	PCT
Middle Tennessee †	16	–	0	1.000	30	–	5	.857
Liberty	11	–	5	.688	18	–	16	.529
FIU	11	–	5	.688	21	–	12	.636
Louisiana Tech	7	–	9	.438	14	–	19	.424
Jacksonville State	7	–	9	.438	12	–	17	.414
New Mexico State	6	–	10	.375	13	–	18	.419
Western Kentucky	6	–	10	.375	15	–	17	.469
UTEP	6	–	10	.375	12	–	19	.387
Sam Houston	2	–	14	.125	7	–	22	.241
† 2024 CUSA tournament winner

The 2023–24 Jacksonville State Gamecocks women's basketball team represented Jacksonville State University during the 2023–24 NCAA Division I women's basketball season. The Gamecocks, led by eleventh-year head coach Rick Pietri, played their home games at the Pete Mathews Coliseum in Jacksonville, Alabama as first-year members of Conference USA (C-USA). They finished the season 12–17, 7–9 in C-USA play, to finish in a tie for fourth place.

== Previous season ==
The Gamecocks finished the 2022–23 season 16–14, 9–9 in ASUN play, to finish in eighth place. As the #8 seed in the ASUN tournament, they were defeated by #7 seed Kennesaw State in the first round. This was their last season as members of the ASUN Conference, as they became members of Conference USA, effective July 1, 2023.

== Roster ==
2023–24 Jacksonville State Gamecocks women's basketball team
Players
Coaches

Pos.	#	Name	Height	Year	Previous school	Hometown
G	0	Rachel Johnson	5 ft 8 in (1.73 m)	GS	Georgia Southern	Eufaula, AL
G	1	Jaz Spencer	5 ft 6 in (1.68 m)	Jr	Hillsborough Community College	Bartow, FL
G	2	Shaquice May	5 ft 10 in (1.78 m)	Jr	Rockdale County High School	Atlanta, GA
G	3	Samiya Steele	5 ft 8 in (1.73 m)	So	Alabama State	Meridianville, AL
F	4	Keiara Griffin	6 ft 0 in (1.83 m)	Sr	Ramsay High School	Birmingham, AL
G	5	Elsie Harris	5 ft 5 in (1.65 m)	RS Jr	Mississippi Gulf Coast Community College	Mobile, AL
F	10	Bre'Anna Rhodes	6 ft 0 in (1.83 m)	Jr	Carver High School	Montgomery, AL
G	11	Eden Sample	5 ft 10 in (1.78 m)	RS So	Old Dominion	Gwinnett, GA
G	13	Kristol Ayson	5 ft 7 in (1.7 m)	Jr	Arizona Western College	Tacoma, WA
F	15	Madison McCoy	6 ft 0 in (1.83 m)	Sr	Walters State Community College	Knoxville, TN
F	22	Mya Barnes	6 ft 0 in (1.83 m)	Jr	Shelton State Community College	Montgomery, AL
F	23	Brooklyn McDaniel	5 ft 11 in (1.8 m)	So	Cleburne County High School	Heflin, AL
F	35	Asia Barclay	6 ft 0 in (1.83 m)	Jr	Shelton State Community College	Anniston, AL

Head coach

- Rick Pietri (South Alabama)

Assistant coach(es)

- Destiny Thomas (Clemson)
- Ka'Vonne Towns (Chattanooga)
- Eric Wise (Louisiana)

Legend

- (C) Team captain
- (S) Suspended
- (I) Ineligible
- (W) Walk-on
- Injured
- Current redshirt

Roster
Last update: January 30, 2024

== Schedule and results ==
Date time, TV	Rank^{#}	Opponent^{#}	Result	Record	High points	High rebounds	High assists	Site (attendance) city, state
Exhibition
November 1, 2023*; 11:30 a.m.		Montevallo	W 85–55	–	–	–	–	Pete Mathews Coliseum; Jacksonville, AL
Non-conference regular season
November 6, 2023*; 7:00 p.m., SECN+		at Auburn	L 49–78	0–1	11 – Steele	7 – McCoy	2 – Steele	Neville Arena (2,232); Auburn, AL
November 9, 2023*; 8:00 p.m., ESPN+		at Utah Tech	L 58–73	0–2	19 – Ayson	9 – 2 tied	3 – 2 tied	Burns Arena (592); St. George, UT
November 12, 2023*; 2:00 p.m., SECN+		at No. 25 Mississippi State	L 45–84	0–3	8 – 3 tied	5 – Barnes	3 – Spencer	Humphrey Coliseum (4,354); Starkville, MS
November 17, 2023*; 6:30 p.m., ESPN+		Alabama–Huntsville	W 67–53	1–3	13 – Ayson	10 – Rhodes	3 – 2 tied	Pete Mathews Coliseum (1,017); Jacksonville, AL
November 20, 2023*; 6:30 p.m., ESPN+		Life	W 83–31	2–3	12 – May	10 – Barclay	6 – Harris	Pete Mathews Coliseum (1,002); Jacksonville, AL
November 27, 2023*; 6:00 p.m., ESPN+		at UAB	L 78–85 ^{OT}	2–4	23 – Harris	9 – Barclay	3 – 2 tied	Bartow Arena (289); Birmingham, AL
November 30, 2023*; 6:00 p.m., YouTube		at Alabama State	W 74–53	3–4	20 – Rhodes	7 – Rhodes	5 – Ayson	Dunn–Oliver Acadome (360); Montgomery, AL
December 3, 2023*; 1:00 p.m., ESPN+		at Samford	L 51–65	3–5	12 – Johnson	4 – 2 tied	4 – Harris	Pete Hanna Center (339); Homewood, AL
December 11, 2023*; 6:00 p.m., FloHoops		at Charleston	L 58–69	3–6	17 – Spencer	9 – Rhodes	3 – Barclay	TD Arena (122); Charleston, SC
December 17, 2023*; 1:00 p.m., ESPN+		Coastal Carolina	W 84–72	4–6	13 – McCoy	8 – Rhodes	3 – 2 tied	Pete Mathews Coliseum (1,012); Jacksonville, AL
December 19, 2023*; 6:30 p.m., ESPN+		UT Arlington	L 64–69	4–7	12 – Ayson	7 – Rhodes	4 – Johnson	Pete Mathews Coliseum (912); Jacksonville, AL
December 29, 2023*; 6:30 p.m., ESPN+		South Carolina State	W 55–41	5–7	12 – McDaniel	11 – Barclay	4 – Steele	Pete Mathews Coliseum (1,012); Jacksonville, AL
C-USA regular season
January 6, 2024; 12:00 p.m., ESPN+		at FIU	L 50–75	5–8 (0–1)	14 – Barnes	8 – Johnson	4 – Spencer	Ocean Bank Convocation Center (478); Miami, FL
January 10, 2024; 6:30 p.m., ESPN+		Liberty	W 78–63	6–8 (1–1)	22 – Spencer	8 – McCoy	6 – Spencer	Pete Mathews Coliseum (1,110); Jacksonville, AL
January 13, 2024; 2:30 p.m., ESPN+		Western Kentucky	L 52–62	6–9 (1–2)	12 – Rhodes	11 – Rhodes	2 – McCoy	Pete Mathews Coliseum (1,013); Jacksonville, AL
January 20, 2024; 2:00 p.m., ESPN+		at Louisiana Tech	L 53–67	6–10 (1–3)	12 – Johnson	9 – Barnes	5 – Harris	Thomas Assembly Center (1,690); Ruston, LA
January 24, 2024; 6:30 p.m., ESPN+		Middle Tennessee	L 45–66	6–11 (1–4)	9 – Ayson	8 – Rhodes	2 – 2 tied	Pete Mathews Coliseum (1,024); Jacksonville, AL
January 27, 2024; 1:00 p.m., ESPN+		at Liberty	L 32–63	6–12 (1–5)	11 – Rhodes	7 – Barnes	2 – 2 tied	Liberty Arena (1,238); Lynchburg, VA
February 1, 2024; 6:30 p.m., ESPN+		UTEP	W 70–62	7–12 (2–5)	21 – Barnes	5 – Rhodes	2 – 2 tied	Pete Mathews Coliseum (1,025); Jacksonville, AL
February 3, 2024; 2:30 p.m., ESPN+		New Mexico State	W 56–49	8–12 (3–5)	17 – Ayson	8 – 2 tied	3 – Ayson	Pete Mathews Coliseum (1,203); Jacksonville, AL
February 8, 2024; 6:30 p.m., ESPN+		at Sam Houston	W 58–56	9–12 (4–5)	10 – Barclay	10 – Barclay	3 – 2 tied	Bernard Johnson Coliseum (413); Huntsville, TX
February 10, 2024; 2:00 p.m., ESPN+		at Western Kentucky	L 45–54	9–13 (4–6)	13 – Spencer	10 – Barclay	4 – Ayson	E. A. Diddle Arena (1,251); Bowling Green, KY
February 15, 2024; 6:30 p.m., ESPN+		Louisiana Tech	L 51–61	9–14 (4–7)	10 – McCoy	7 – 2 tied	2 – 3 tied	Pete Mathews Coliseum (1,015); Jacksonville, AL
February 21, 2024; 6:30 p.m., ESPN+		at Middle Tennessee	L 40–66	9–15 (4–8)	12 – Ayson	7 – Ayson	3 – 2 tied	Murphy Center (3,613); Murfreesboro, TN
February 24, 2024; 2:30 p.m., ESPN+		FIU	W 80–63	10–15 (5–8)	25 – Johnson	8 – Rhodes	5 – Harris	Pete Mathews Coliseum (268); Jacksonville, AL
February 29, 2024; 8:00 p.m., ESPN+		at UTEP	L 48–70	10–16 (5–9)	15 – Johnson	6 – Johnson	4 – Johnson	Don Haskins Center (1,215); El Paso, TX
March 2, 2024; 3:00 p.m., ESPN+		at New Mexico State	W 60–51	11–16 (6–9)	14 – Steele	4 – McCoy	4 – 2 tied	Pan American Center (2,893); Las Cruces, NM
March 9, 2024; 2:00 p.m., ESPN+		Sam Houston	W 74–70 ^{OT}	12–16 (7–9)	19 – McCoy	10 – Ayson	4 – Harris	Pete Mathews Coliseum (1,223); Jacksonville, AL
C-USA tournament
March 14, 2024; 11:30 a.m., ESPN+	(5)	vs. (5) Louisiana Tech; Quarterfinals	L 54–60	12–17	22 – Barnes	7 – Barnes	3 – Ayson	Von Braun Center (2,157); Huntsville, AL
*Non-conference game. ^{#}Rankings from AP poll. (#) Tournament seedings in parentheses. All times are in Central.
