= 2023–24 New Mexico State Aggies women's basketball team =

American college basketball season

2023–24 New Mexico State Aggies women's basketball
- Conference: Conference USA
- Record: 13–18 (6–10 C-USA)
- Head coach: Jody Adams (2nd season)
- Associate head coach: James Frey
- Assistant coaches: Kezia Conyers-Barnes; Rabun Wright; Jaren Harris
- Home arena: Pan American Center

2023–24 Conference USA women's basketball standings
	Conf.				Overall
Team	W		L	PCT	W		L	PCT
Middle Tennessee †	16	–	0	1.000	30	–	5	.857
Liberty	11	–	5	.688	18	–	16	.529
FIU	11	–	5	.688	21	–	12	.636
Louisiana Tech	7	–	9	.438	14	–	19	.424
Jacksonville State	7	–	9	.438	12	–	17	.414
New Mexico State	6	–	10	.375	13	–	18	.419
Western Kentucky	6	–	10	.375	15	–	17	.469
UTEP	6	–	10	.375	12	–	19	.387
Sam Houston	2	–	14	.125	7	–	22	.241
† 2024 CUSA tournament winner

The 2023–24 New Mexico State Aggies women's basketball team represented New Mexico State University during the 2023–24 NCAA Division I women's basketball season. The Aggies, led by second-year head coach Jody Adams, played their home games at the Pan American Center in Las Cruces, New Mexico as first-year members of Conference USA.

The Aggies finished the season 13–18, 6–10 in C-USA play, to finish in a tie for sixth place. They upset FIU before falling to Liberty in the semifinals of the C-USA tournament.

== Previous season ==
The Aggies finished the 2022–23 season 18–17, 10–8 in Western Athletic Conference (WAC) play, to finish in a tie for fifth place. In the WAC tournament, they defeated UT Rio Grande Valley in the first round before falling to Southern Utah in the quarterfinals. They were invited to the WBI, where they defeated UIC in the first round and East Tennessee State in the semifinals, before falling to WAC foe California Baptist in the championship game. This was the Aggies' last season as members of the Western Athletic Conference, as they became members of Conference USA, effective July 1, 2023.

== Roster ==
2023–24 New Mexico State Aggies women's basketball team
Players
Coaches

Pos.	#	Name	Height	Year	Previous school	Hometown
G	0	Molly Kaiser	5 ft 8 in (1.73 m)	Sr	Saginaw High School	Watauga, TX
G	1	Imani Warren	5 ft 10 in (1.78 m)	Fr	Rufus King High School	Milwaukee, WI
G	2	Loes Rozing	5 ft 10 in (1.78 m)	Jr	South Georgia Tech	Heiloo, Netherlands
G	3	Sianny Sanchez-Oliver	5 ft 5 in (1.65 m)	Jr	Delaware State	Powder Springs, GA
G	4	Jaila Harding	5 ft 8 in (1.73 m)	Jr	Butler Community College	Wichita, KS
G	10	Sabou Gueye	5 ft 9 in (1.75 m)	Jr	Northwest Florida State College	Dakar, Senegal
G	11	Sha'Kyia Parker	5 ft 8 in (1.73 m)	GS	Siena Heights	Grand Rapids, MI
F	12	Ene Adams	6 ft 1 in (1.85 m)	Sr	St. Bonaventure	Jos, Nigeria
G	23	Sylena Peterson	5 ft 7 in (1.7 m)	Jr	Bonita Vista High School	San Diego, CA
F	24	Lucía Yenes	6 ft 0 in (1.83 m)	So	Baloncesto Torrelodones	Madrid, Spain
G	30	Fama Thiam	5 ft 11 in (1.8 m)	GS	Pima Community College	Thiès, Senegal
G/F	32	Tylie Jones	6 ft 0 in (1.83 m)	Jr	College of Southern Idaho	Rigby, ID
C	34	Femme Sikuzani Masudi	6 ft 5 in (1.96 m)	GS	Texas	Goma, DR Congo
F	41	Maiya Bergdorf	5 ft 11 in (1.8 m)	Jr	Three Rivers College	Belmont, MA
F	42/33	Fanta Gassama	6 ft 1 in (1.85 m)	Jr	South Georgia Tech	Mataró, Spain

Head coach

- Jody Adams (Tennessee)

Assistant coach(es)

- James Frey (Troy)
- Kezia Conyers-Barnes (Ohio)
- Rabun Wright (North Alabama)
- Jaren Harris (Albany State)

Legend

- (C) Team captain
- (S) Suspended
- (I) Ineligible
- (W) Walk-on
- Injured
- Current redshirt

Roster
Last update: January 30, 2024

== Schedule and results ==
Date time, TV	Rank^{#}	Opponent^{#}	Result	Record	High points	High rebounds	High assists	Site (attendance) city, state
Exhibition
October 29, 2023*; 2:00 p.m.		Eastern New Mexico	W 77–55	–	–	–	–	Pan American Center; Las Cruces, NM
Non-conference regular season
November 6, 2023*; 6:00 p.m., ESPN+		Arizona	L 57–68	0–1	22 – Kaiser	6 – Kaiser	3 – 2 tied	Pan American Center (1,297); Las Cruces, NM
November 10, 2023*; 6:00 p.m., ESPN+		at UTSA	L 55–58	0–2	17 – Jones	9 – Adams	3 – Kaiser	Convocation Center (712); San Antonio, TX
November 12, 2023*; 12:00 p.m., ESPN+		at Incarnate Word	W 59–52	1–2	15 – Kaiser	8 – Adams	4 – Adams	McDermott Center (103); San Antonio, TX
November 18, 2023*; 2:00 p.m., ESPN+		Portland State	W 57–38	2–2	17 – Kaiser	8 – Rozing	4 – Gueye	Pan American Center; Las Cruces, NM
November 24, 2023*; 2:00 p.m., NEC Front Row		vs. Hampton; LIU Classic	W 78–47	3–2	22 – Harding	8 – 2 tied	6 – Sanchez-Oliver	Steinberg Wellness Center (100); Brooklyn, NY
November 25, 2023*; 11:00 am, NEC Front Row		vs. Cal State Bakersfield; LIU Classic	W 64–59	4–2	17 – Kaiser	11 – Gueye	7 – Peterson	Steinberg Wellness Center (143); Brooklyn, NY
December 2, 2023*; 1:00 p.m., MWN		at New Mexico; Rio Grande Rivalry	L 52–67	4–3	20 – Yenes	7 – Adams	4 – Sanchez-Oliver	The Pit (5,379); Albuquerque, NM
December 5, 2023*; 6:00 p.m., ESPN+		UC Irvine	L 55–61	4–4	15 – Kaiser	5 – 3 tied	2 – Sanchez-Oliver	Pan American Center (478); Las Cruces, NM
December 12, 2023*; 5:00 p.m., ESPN+		Western New Mexico	W 89–54	5–4	22 – Kaiser	9 – Yenes	3 – 2 tied	Pan American Center (432); Las Cruces, NM
December 16, 2023*; 1:00 p.m., ESPN+		Utah Valley	W 70–39	6–4	17 – Harding	7 – Adams	7 – Peterson	Pan American Center (351); Las Cruces, NM
December 20, 2023*; 12:00 p.m., ESPN+		at Austin Peay; APSU Christmas Tournament	L 55–57 ^{OT}	6–5	13 – Kaiser	5 – Gassama	2 – 3 tied	F&M Bank Arena (1,548); Clarksville, TN
December 21, 2023*; 11:00 am		vs. Troy; APSU Christmas Tournament	L 66–81	6–6	17 – 3 tied	9 – Rozing	2 – 2 tied	F&M Bank Arena; Clarksville, TN
December 30, 2023*; 1:00 p.m., ESPN+		at UT Arlington	L 60–61	6–7	25 – Kaiser	8 – Sikuzani Masudi	8 – Sanchez-Oliver	College Park Center (976); Arlington, TX
C-USA regular season
January 6, 2024; 2:00 p.m., ESPN+		at UTEP; Battle of I-10	L 72–81	6–8 (0–1)	22 – Harding	5 – Adams	8 – Sanchez-Oliver	Don Haskins Center (1,939); El Paso, TX
January 11, 2024; 6:00 p.m., ESPN+		FIU	L 52–57	6–9 (0–2)	10 – Harding	11 – Gassama	2 – 3 tied	Pan American Center (846); Las Cruces, NM
January 18, 2024; 5:30 p.m., ESPN+		at Western Kentucky	W 50–44	7–9 (1–2)	12 – Harding	7 – Adams	4 – Kaiser	E. A. Diddle Arena (782); Bowling Green, KY
January 20, 2024; 1:00 p.m., ESPN+		at Middle Tennessee	L 48–85	7–10 (1–3)	11 – Kaiser	7 – Gassama	3 – Sanchez-Oliver	Murphy Center (3,605); Murfreesboro, TN
January 25, 2024; 6:00 p.m., ESPN+		Sam Houston	W 76–63	8–10 (2–3)	19 – Kaiser	9 – Gassama	4 – Peterson	Pan American Center (458); Las Cruces, NM
January 27, 2024; 12:00 p.m., ESPN+		Louisiana Tech	W 66–64 ^{OT}	9–10 (3–3)	16 – Harding	10 – Gassama	5 – Gassama	Pan American Center (909); Las Cruces, NM
February 1, 2024; 5:00 p.m., ESPN+		at Liberty	L 53–69	9–11 (3–4)	11 – Kaiser	6 – Gassama	2 – Kaiser	Liberty Arena (1,126); Lynchburg, VA
February 3, 2024; 1:30 p.m., ESPN+		at Jacksonville State	L 49–56	9–12 (3–5)	25 – Kaiser	7 – Gassama	2 – Kaiser	Pete Mathews Coliseum (1,203); Jacksonville, AL
February 10, 2024; 2:00 p.m., ESPN+		UTEP; Battle of I-10	W 66–59	10–12 (4–5)	16 – Harding	12 – Adams	3 – Sanchez-Oliver	Pan American Center (1,357); Las Cruces, NM
February 15, 2024; 6:00 p.m., ESPN+		Middle Tennessee	L 37–73	10–13 (4–6)	10 – Kaiser	8 – Adams	3 – Peterson	Pan American Center (1,045); Las Cruces, NM
February 17, 2024; 2:00 p.m., ESPN+		Western Kentucky	W 64–61	11–13 (5–6)	16 – Harding	8 – Gassama	5 – Peterson	Pan American Center (1,007); Las Cruces, NM
February 22, 2024; 5:30 p.m., ESPN+		at Sam Houston	L 56–66 ^{OT}	11–14 (5–7)	14 – Kaiser	10 – Gassama	7 – Peterson	Bernard Johnson Coliseum (449); Huntsville, TX
February 24, 2024; 1:00 p.m., ESPN+		at Louisiana Tech	L 63–70 ^{OT}	11–15 (5–8)	15 – Adams	8 – Gassama	4 – Gassama	Thomas Assembly Center (1,775); Ruston, LA
February 29, 2024; 6:00 p.m., ESPN+		Liberty	L 56–60	11–16 (5–9)	20 – Kaiser	14 – Gassama	3 – Gassama	Pan American Center (808); Las Cruces, NM
March 2, 2024; 2:00 p.m., ESPN+		Jacksonville State	L 51–60	11–17 (5–10)	17 – Kaiser	9 – Adams	3 – Sanchez-Oliver	Pan American Center (2,893); Las Cruces, NM
March 9, 2024; 11:00 am, ESPN+		at FIU	W 65–56	12–17 (6–10)	20 – Kaiser	13 – Gassama	3 – 2 tied	Ocean Bank Convocation Center (405); Miami, FL
C-USA tournament
March 14, 2024; 1:00 p.m., ESPN+	(6)	vs. (3) FIU; Quarterfinals	W 63–58	13–17	22 – Kaiser	17 – Gassama	2 – 2 tied	Von Braun Center (2,029); Huntsville, AL
March 15, 2024; 7:00 p.m., ESPN+	(6)	vs. (2) Liberty; Semifinals	L 70-82	13-18	16 – Kaiser	9 – Masudi	4 – Kaiser	Von Braun Center (2,157); Huntsville, AL
*Non-conference game. ^{#}Rankings from AP poll. (#) Tournament seedings in parentheses. All times are in Mountain.
