= 2023–24 FIU Panthers women's basketball team =

American college basketball season

2023–24 FIU Panthers women's basketball

WNIT, second round
- Conference: Conference USA
- Record: 21–12 (11–5 C-USA)
- Head coach: Jesyka Burks-Wiley (3rd season)
- Assistant coaches: Christelle N'Garsanet; Dan Wendt; Heather Karner
- Home arena: Ocean Bank Convocation Center

2023–24 Conference USA women's basketball standings
	Conf.				Overall
Team	W		L	PCT	W		L	PCT
Middle Tennessee †	16	–	0	1.000	30	–	5	.857
Liberty	11	–	5	.688	18	–	16	.529
FIU	11	–	5	.688	21	–	12	.636
Louisiana Tech	7	–	9	.438	14	–	19	.424
Jacksonville State	7	–	9	.438	12	–	17	.414
New Mexico State	6	–	10	.375	13	–	18	.419
Western Kentucky	6	–	10	.375	15	–	17	.469
UTEP	6	–	10	.375	12	–	19	.387
Sam Houston	2	–	14	.125	7	–	22	.241
† 2024 CUSA tournament winner

The 2023–24 FIU Panthers women's basketball team represented Florida International University during the 2023–24 NCAA Division I women's basketball season. The Panthers, led by third-year head coach Jesyka Burks-Wiley, played their home games at Ocean Bank Convocation Center in Miami, Florida as members of Conference USA (C-USA).

The Panthers finished the season 21–12, 11–5 in C-USA play, to finish in a tie for second place. They were upset by sixth-seeded New Mexico State in the quarterfinals of the C-USA tournament. They received an at-large bid to the WNIT, where they defeated Stetson in the first round before falling to Troy in the second round.

== Previous season ==
The Panthers finished the 2022–23 season 14–19, 7–13 in C-USA play, to finish in a tie for eighth place. Due to tiebreakers, they received the #8 seed in the C-USA tournament, they were defeated by #9 seed Charlotte in the quarterfinals. They received an invitation into the WBI, where they were defeated by East Tennessee State in the first round and defeated UIC in the consolation round, before defeating North Dakota in the fifth-place game.

== Roster ==
2023–24 FIU Panthers women's basketball team
Players
Coaches

Pos.	#	Name	Height	Year	Previous school	Hometown
G	0	Angena Belloso	5 ft 11 in (1.8 m)	So	St. Francis Brooklyn	Montgat, Spain
G	1	Kaliah Henderson	5 ft 9 in (1.75 m)	GS	Saint Joseph's	Tampa, FL
SG	2	Olivia Trice	5 ft 10 in (1.78 m)	GS	Bowling Green	Huber Heights, OH
PG	3	Tanajah Hayes	5 ft 6 in (1.68 m)	Jr	Zebulon B. Vance High School	Charlotte, NC
F	5	Lauren Stewart	6 ft 1 in (1.85 m)	Fr	Mainland High School	Flagler Beach, FL
F	12	Ajae Yoakum	6 ft 0 in (1.83 m)	Sr	Eastern Arizona College	Portland, OR
G	15	Fantasia James	5 ft 9 in (1.75 m)	Fr	Oakleaf High School	Jacksonville, FL
F	21	Courtney Turner	5 ft 10 in (1.78 m)	Jr	USC Upstate	Smyrna, DE
F	23	Mya Kone	6 ft 2 in (1.88 m)	So	James Madison	Pompano Beach, FL
SG	24	Sariana Rodriguez Camacho	6 ft 1 in (1.85 m)	Sr	Florida SouthWestern	Morovis, Puerto Rico
SG	30	Aileen Marquez	5 ft 8 in (1.73 m)	Jr	Clarendon College	Puebla, Mexico
F	34	Courtney Prenger	6 ft 1 in (1.85 m)	GS	Xavier	Minster, OH
F	44	Maria Torres	6 ft 1 in (1.85 m)	Sr	Colorado State	Madrid, Spain

Head coach

- Jesyka Burks-Wiley (Boston University)

Assistant coach(es)

- Christelle N'Garsanet (Missouri)
- Dan Wendt (West Valley College)
- Heather Karner (Youngstown State)

Legend

- (C) Team captain
- (S) Suspended
- (I) Ineligible
- (W) Walk-on
- Injured
- Current redshirt

Roster
Last update: January 27, 2024

== Schedule and results ==
Date time, TV	Rank^{#}	Opponent^{#}	Result	Record	High points	High rebounds	High assists	Site (attendance) city, state
Non-conference regular season
November 6, 2023*; 7:00 p.m., ESPN+		Florida National	W 113–30	1–0	20 – Kone	14 – Kone	8 – Hayes	Ocean Bank Convocation Center (494); Miami, FL
November 10, 2023*; 7:30 p.m., ESPN+		at UT Rio Grande Valley	W 65–64	2–0	13 – Yoakum	7 – Kone	5 – Hayes	UTRGV Fieldhouse (634); Edinburg, TX
November 14, 2023*; 7:00 p.m., ESPN+		at Florida Gulf Coast	L 48–81	2–1	15 – Trice	5 – Hayes	1 – 4 tied	Alico Arena (1,503); Fort Myers, FL
November 18, 2023*; 1:00 p.m., ESPN+		Coppin State	L 66–70	2–2	19 – Yoakum	11 – Yoakum	3 – Hayes	Ocean Bank Convocation Center (404); Miami, FL
November 24, 2023*; 12:00 p.m., ESPN+		Bryant; FIU Thanksgiving Tournament	W 88–59	3–2	22 – Kone	11 – Kone	7 – Trice	Ocean Bank Convocation Center (324); Miami, FL
November 26, 2023*; 2:00 p.m., ESPN+		William & Mary; FIU Thanksgiving Tournament	L 57–59	3–3	16 – Kone	10 – Kone	2 – 2 tied	Ocean Bank Convocation Center (389); Miami, FL
November 29, 2023*; 3:00 p.m., ESPN+		Georgia Southern	L 69–81	3–4	11 – Belloso	8 – Kone	3 – Trice	Ocean Bank Convocation Center (323); Miami, FL
December 1, 2023*; 7:00 p.m., ESPN+		Jacksonville	W 88–81	4–4	21 – Trice	10 – Yoakum	3 – 4 tied	Ocean Bank Convocation Center (355); Miami, FL
December 3, 2023*; 1:00 p.m., ESPN+		Bethune–Cookman	W 54–51	5–4	10 – 2 tied	6 – 2 tied	3 – Prenger	Ocean Bank Convocation Center (318); Miami, FL
December 14, 2023*; 11:00 a.m., ESPN+		at Florida Atlantic	W 65–62	6–4	16 – Henderson	11 – Yoakum	4 – Yoakum	Eleanor R. Baldwin Arena (2,067); Boca Raton, FL
December 18, 2023*; 12:00 p.m., ESPN+		Texas State; MTE Christmas Classic	L 61–67	6–5	16 – Prenger	8 – Yoakum	5 – 2 tied	Ocean Bank Convocation Center (331); Miami, FL
December 19, 2023*; 12:00 p.m., ESPN+		Alabama A&M; MTE Christmas Classic	W 87–63	7–5	30 – Yoakum	10 – Kone	4 – 2 tied	Ocean Bank Convocation Center (321); Miami, FL
December 20, 2023*; 12:00 p.m., ESPN+		Chicago State; MTE Christmas Classic	W 73–55	8–5	14 – Belloso	9 – Turner	2 – 5 tied	Ocean Bank Convocation Center (326); Miami, FL
December 30, 2023*; 1:00 p.m., ESPN+		Utah Tech	W 68–62	9–5	19 – Kone	9 – Yoakum	4 – Belloso	Ocean Bank Convocation Center (298); Miami, FL
C-USA regular season
January 6, 2024; 1:00 p.m., ESPN+		Jacksonville State	W 75–50	10–5 (1–0)	28 – Kone	11 – Kone	7 – Hayes	Ocean Bank Convocation Center (478); Miami, FL
January 11, 2024; 8:00 p.m., ESPN+		at New Mexico State	W 57–52	11–5 (2–0)	18 – Hayes	13 – Kone	3 – Hayes	Pan American Center (846); Las Cruces, NM
January 13, 2024; 2:30 p.m., ESPN+		at UTEP	W 83–62	12–5 (3–0)	17 – Trice	9 – Kone	8 – Hayes	Don Haskins Center (978); El Paso, TX
January 18, 2024; 7:00 p.m., ESPN+		Liberty	W 70–59	13–5 (4–0)	14 – Kone	9 – 2 tied	3 – 2 tied	Ocean Bank Convocation Center (553); Miami, FL
January 25, 2024; 7:00 p.m., ESPN+		Western Kentucky	W 70–60	14–5 (5–0)	15 – Hayes	10 – Yoakum	3 – 2 tied	Ocean Bank Convocation Center (405); Miami, FL
January 27, 2024; 1:00 p.m., ESPN+		Middle Tennessee	L 62–92	14–6 (5–1)	26 – Henderson	8 – Kone	6 – Hayes	Ocean Bank Convocation Center (325); Miami, FL
February 1, 2024; 7:00 p.m., ESPN+		at Louisiana Tech	W 73–71	15–6 (6–1)	14 – Hayes	7 – Kone	4 – Hayes	Thomas Assembly Center (1,902); Ruston, LA
February 3, 2024; 3:00 p.m., ESPN+		at Sam Houston	W 71–65	16–6 (7–1)	24 – Hayes	13 – Kone	4 – Hayes	Bernard Johnson Coliseum (510); Huntsville, TX
February 10, 2024; 1:00 p.m., ESPN+		at Middle Tennessee	L 54–73	16–7 (7–2)	13 – 2 tied	7 – Belloso	2 – Belloso	Murphy Center (4,428); Murfreesboro, TN
February 15, 2024; 11:00 a.m., ESPN+		Sam Houston	W 64–49	17–7 (8–2)	16 – Hayes	8 – Belloso	5 – Rodriguez Camacho	Ocean Bank Convocation Center (2,084); Miami, FL
February 17, 2024; 1:00 p.m., ESPN+		Louisiana Tech	W 68–51	18–7 (9–2)	13 – 2 tied	18 – Kone	3 – Hayes	Ocean Bank Convocation Center (419); Miami, FL
February 22, 2024; 7:00 p.m., ESPN+		at Liberty	L 56–71	18–8 (9–3)	17 – Henderson	6 – Henderson	4 – Hayes	Liberty Arena (1,396); Lynchburg, VA
February 24, 2024; 3:30 p.m., ESPN+		at Jacksonville State	L 63–81	18–9 (9–4)	17 – Kone	12 – Kone	3 – 2 tied	Pete Mathews Coliseum (268); Jacksonville, AL
March 2, 2024; 2:00 p.m., ESPN+		at Western Kentucky	W 71–68	19–9 (10–4)	23 – Henderson	8 – Kone	5 – Hayes	E. A. Diddle Arena (1,153); Bowling Green, KY
March 7, 2024; 7:00 p.m., ESPN+		UTEP	W 88–62	20–9 (11–4)	15 – Hayes	9 – Hayes	7 – Hayes	Ocean Bank Convocation Center (444); Miami, FL
March 9, 2024; 1:00 p.m., ESPN+		New Mexico State	L 56–65	20–10 (11–5)	18 – Hayes	6 – Kone	3 – Henderson	Ocean Bank Convocation Center (405); Miami, FL
C-USA tournament
March 14, 2024; 3:00 p.m., ESPN+	(3)	vs. (6) New Mexico State; Quarterfinals	L 58–63	20–11	18 – Hayes	7 – Henderson	3 – Hayes	Von Braun Center (2,029); Huntsville, AL
WNIT
March 21, 2024*; 7:00 p.m., ESPN+		Stetson; First round	W 60–47	21–11	17 – Hayes	9 – Kone	6 – Trice	Ocean Bank Convocation Center (358); Miami, FL
March 25, 2024*; 7:00 p.m., ESPN+		at Troy; Second round	L 62–92	21–12	22 – Prenger	15 – Kone	5 – Hayes	Trojan Arena (2,196); Troy, AL
*Non-conference game. ^{#}Rankings from AP poll. (#) Tournament seedings in parentheses. All times are in Eastern.
