= 2023–24 Liberty Lady Flames basketball team =

American college basketball season

2023–24 Liberty Lady Flames basketball
- Conference: Conference USA
- Record: 18–16 (11–5 C-USA)
- Head coach: Carey Green (25th season)
- Associate head coach: Alexis Sherard
- Assistant coaches: Andrea "Andy" Bloodworth; Katie Mattera; Dan Lumpkin; Amber Lee
- Home arena: Liberty Arena

2023–24 Conference USA women's basketball standings
	Conf.				Overall
Team	W		L	PCT	W		L	PCT
Middle Tennessee †	16	–	0	1.000	30	–	5	.857
Liberty	11	–	5	.688	18	–	16	.529
FIU	11	–	5	.688	21	–	12	.636
Louisiana Tech	7	–	9	.438	14	–	19	.424
Jacksonville State	7	–	9	.438	12	–	17	.414
New Mexico State	6	–	10	.375	13	–	18	.419
Western Kentucky	6	–	10	.375	15	–	17	.469
UTEP	6	–	10	.375	12	–	19	.387
Sam Houston	2	–	14	.125	7	–	22	.241
† 2024 CUSA tournament winner

The 2023–24 Liberty Lady Flames basketball team represented Liberty University during the 2023–24 NCAA Division I women's basketball season. The Lady Flames, led by 25th-year head coach Carey Green, played their home games at Liberty Arena in Lynchburg, Virginia as first-year members of Conference USA (C-USA).

The Lady Flames finished the season 18–16, 11–5 in C-USA play, to finish in a tie for second place. They defeated Western Kentucky and New Mexico State, before falling to top-seeded Middle Tennessee in the C-USA tournament championship game.

== Previous season ==
The Lady Flames finished the 2022–23 season 24–9, 16–2 in ASUN play, to finish in second place. As the #2 seed in the ASUN tournament, they defeated #7 seed Kennesaw State in the quarterfinals and #3 seed Lipscomb in the semifinals, before falling to top-seeded Florida Gulf Coast in the championship game. They received an automatic bid into the WNIT, where they fell to Bowling Green in the first round. This was their last season as members of the ASUN Conference, as they became members of Conference USA, effective July 1, 2023.

== Roster ==
2023–24 Liberty Lady Flames women's basketball team
Players
Coaches

Pos.	#	Name	Height	Year	Previous school	Hometown
G	0	Jordan Hodges	5 ft 6 in (1.68 m)	Jr	Monacan High School	Richmond, VA
G	4	Claudia Acin	5 ft 8 in (1.73 m)	Fr	Les Alzines	Girona, Spain
G	5	Emma Hjördísardóttir	5 ft 10 in (1.78 m)	Fr	Fjölbrautaskólinn við Ármúla	Reykjavík, Iceland
G	10	Brooke Moore	5 ft 11 in (1.8 m)	Fr	North Cobb Christian School	Kennesaw, GA
F	11	Caroline Shiery	6 ft 3 in (1.91 m)	RS Fr	Central Dauphin High School	Harrisburg, PA
G	12	Asia Boone	5 ft 8 in (1.73 m)	Fr	IMG Academy	San Diego, CA
G	13	Casey Hunt	5 ft 8 in (1.73 m)	RS So	Bradford Christian Academy	Groveland, MA
C	14	Emily Howard	6 ft 5 in (1.96 m)	RS So	Harding Academy	Vancouver, BC
G	21	Pien Steenbergen	6 ft 1 in (1.85 m)	So	Calandlyceum	Berlicum, Netherlands
F	22	Jordan Bailey	6 ft 1 in (1.85 m)	RS Sr	Old Dominion	Colbert, GA
G	23	Emma Hess	5 ft 11 in (1.8 m)	Jr	Legacy Christian Academy	Beavercreek, OH
G	24	Ella Wigal	6 ft 0 in (1.83 m)	Fr	IMG Academy	Granville, OH
F	25	Elisabeth Aegisdottir	6 ft 1 in (1.85 m)	Fr	Fjolbrautarskoli Suournesja	Grindavík, Iceland
C	31	Bella Smuda	6 ft 6 in (1.98 m)	RS Jr	Downingtown East High School	Exton, PA

Head coach

- Carey Green (Coastal Carolina)

Assistant coach(es)

- Alexis Sherard (Saint Michael's)
- Andrea "Andy" Bloodworth (Calvin)
- Katie Mattera (Liberty)
- Dan Lumpkin (Austin Peay)
- Amber Lee (Maryville)

Legend

- (C) Team captain
- (S) Suspended
- (I) Ineligible
- (W) Walk-on
- Injured
- Current redshirt

Roster
Last update: January 30, 2024

== Schedule and results ==
Date time, TV	Rank^{#}	Opponent^{#}	Result	Record	High points	High rebounds	High assists	Site (attendance) city, state
Non-conference regular season
November 6, 2023*; 3:00 p.m., ESPN+		Frostburg State	W 68–46	1–0	21 – Hess	13 – Smuda	3 – 3 tied	Liberty Arena (797); Lynchburg, VA
November 10, 2023*; 7:30 p.m., ESPN+		at Stephen F. Austin	W 84–81 ^{OT}	2–0	18 – Bailey	11 – Smuda	5 – 2 tied	William R. Johnson Coliseum (1,087); Nacogdoches, TX
November 12, 2023*; 3:00 p.m., LHN		at No. 13 Texas	L 57–75	2–1	11 – Wigal	6 – 2 tied	3 – 3 tied	Moody Center (5,189); Austin, TX
November 19, 2023*; 2:00 p.m., FloHoops		at North Carolina A&T	L 47–56	3–1	14 – Hess	7 – 2 tied	3 – Hodges	Corbett Sports Center (612); Greensboro, NC
November 24, 2023*; 2:15 p.m., ESPN+		vs. Gonzaga; Betty Chancellor Classic	L 59–102	2–3	14 – Smuda	5 – 2 tied	3 – 2 tied	Merrell Center (215); Katy, TX
November 25, 2023*; 12:00 p.m., ESPN+		vs. No. 20 Louisville; Betty Chancellor Classic	L 63–72	2–4	17 – Smuda	9 – Smuda	6 – 2 tied	Merrell Center (256); Katy, TX
November 26, 2023*; 11:30 a.m., ESPN+		vs. Alabama; Betty Chancellor Classic	L 47–72	2–5	14 – Bailey	8 – Bailey	3 – Hess	Merrell Center; Katy, TX
December 1, 2023*; 12:00 p.m., ESPN+		James Madison	W 67–53	3–5	18 – 2 tied	7 – Hodges	6 – Hodges	Liberty Arena (755); Lynchburg, VA
December 4, 2023*; 7:00 p.m., ESPN+		Towson	L 70–73 ^{OT}	3–6	22 – Smuda	14 – Smuda	5 – Hodges	Liberty Arena (760); Lynchburg, VA
December 10, 2023*; 2:00 p.m., ACCNX		at No. 3 NC State	L 67–80	3–7	17 – Boone	16 – Smuda	7 – Hodges	Reynolds Coliseum (5,500); Raleigh, NC
December 13, 2023*; 6:00 p.m., ESPN+		Radford	L 45–57	3–8	9 – 2 tied	10 – Smuda	3 – Hodges	Liberty Arena (603); Lynchburg, VA
December 16, 2023*; 2:00 p.m., ESPN+		at Richmond	L 73–99	3–9	20 – Hess	6 – Smuda	5 – Hodges	Robins Center (747); Richmond, VA
December 20, 2023*; 2:00 p.m., ESPN+		Grand Canyon	W 65–52	4–9	24 – Smuda	12 – Smuda	5 – Hodges	Liberty Arena (697); Lynchburg, VA
December 29, 2023*; 7:00 p.m., ESPN+		Randolph	W 69–49	5–9	18 – Smuda	10 – Smuda	4 – Aegisdottir	Liberty Arena (792); Lynchburg, VA
December 31, 2023*; 2:00 p.m., ESPN+		Tennessee	L 55–90	5–10	12 – Hess	9 – Smuda	4 – Hodges	Liberty Arena (2,105); Lynchburg, VA
C-USA regular season
January 6, 2024; 2:00 p.m., ESPN+		Western Kentucky	L 66–68	5–11 (0–1)	14 – 2 tied	11 – Bailey	5 – Hodges	Liberty Arena (724); Lynchburg, VA
January 10, 2024; 7:30 p.m., ESPN+		at Jacksonville State	L 63–78	5–12 (0–2)	26 – Smuda	17 – Smuda	5 – Hess	Pete Mathews Coliseum (1,110); Jacksonville, AL
January 13, 2024; 1:00 p.m., ESPN+		Louisiana Tech	W 66–59	6–12 (1–2)	14 – Hess	15 – Smuda	6 – Hodges	Liberty Arena (1,008); Lynchburg, VA
January 18, 2024; 7:00 p.m., ESPN+		at FIU	L 59–70	6–13 (1–3)	18 – Boone	9 – Boone	3 – 2 tied	Ocean Bank Convocation Center (553); Miami, FL
January 20, 2024; 3:00 p.m., ESPN+		at Sam Houston	W 84–77	7–13 (2–3)	30 – Hess	11 – Smuda	7 – Hodges	Bernard Johnson Coliseum (481); Huntsville, TX
January 27, 2024; 2:00 p.m., ESPN+		Jacksonville State	W 63–32	8–13 (3–3)	14 – Smuda	7 – 2 tied	4 – Acin	Liberty Arena (1,238); Lynchburg, VA
February 1, 2024; 7:00 p.m., ESPN+		New Mexico State	W 69–53	9–13 (4–3)	22 – Smuda	13 – Smuda	5 – Hodges	Liberty Arena (1,126); Lynchburg, VA
February 3, 2024; 1:00 p.m., ESPN+		UTEP	W 87–68	10–13 (5–3)	27 – Smuda	7 – Smuda	10 – Hodges	Liberty Arena (842); Lynchburg, VA
February 8, 2024; 7:30 p.m., ESPN+		at Middle Tennessee	L 55–81	10–14 (5–4)	18 – Smuda	7 – Hess	4 – Boone	Murphy Center (4,505); Murfreesboro, TN
February 10, 2024; 3:00 p.m., ESPN+		at Louisiana Tech	W 55–53	11–14 (6–4)	29 – Hess	13 – Smuda	4 – Hodges	Thomas Assembly Center (1,604); Ruston, LA
February 17, 2024; 2:00 p.m., ESPN+		Sam Houston	W 86–56	12–14 (7–4)	23 – Smuda	9 – Smuda	5 – Hodges	Liberty Arena (1,253); Lynchburg, VA
February 22, 2024; 7:00 p.m., ESPN+		FIU	W 71–56	13–14 (8–4)	17 – Hess	14 – Smuda	4 – Hodges	Liberty Arena (1,396); Lynchburg, VA
February 29, 2024; 8:00 p.m., ESPN+		at New Mexico State	W 60–56	14–14 (9–4)	26 – Hess	8 – Smuda	6 – Hodges	Pan American Center (808); Las Cruces, NM
March 2, 2024; 3:00 p.m., ESPN+		at UTEP	W 80–63	15–14 (10–4)	25 – Boone	10 – Smuda	8 – Hodges	Don Haskins Center (1,155); El Paso, TX
March 6, 2024; 7:00 p.m., ESPN+		Middle Tennessee	L 52–67	15–15 (10–5)	17 – Smuda	14 – Smuda	3 – 3 tied	Liberty Arena (980); Lynchburg, VA
March 9, 2024; 3:00 p.m., ESPN+		at Western Kentucky	W 84–77	16–15 (11–5)	22 – Hess	9 – Smuda	8 – Hodges	E. A. Diddle Arena (1,613); Bowling Green, KY
C-USA tournament
March 13, 2024; 3:00 p.m., ESPN+	(2)	vs. (7) Western Kentucky; Quarterfinals	W 62–59	17–15	17 – 2 tied	12 – Smuda	6 – Hodges	Von Braun Center (636); Huntsville, AL
March 15, 2024; 9:00 p.m., ESPN+	(2)	vs. (6) New Mexico State; Semifinals	W 82–70	18–15	20 – Boone	11 – Smuda	6 – Hodges	Von Braun Center (2,157); Huntsville, AL
March 16, 2024; 5:30 p.m., CBSSN	(2)	vs. (1) Middle Tennessee; Championship	L 51–67	18–16	21 – Smuda	15 – Smuda	3 – 2 tied	Von Braun Center (4,301); Huntsville, AL
*Non-conference game. ^{#}Rankings from AP poll. (#) Tournament seedings in parentheses. All times are in Eastern.
