= Wichita State Shockers women's basketball =

College level women's basketball team

2026–27 Wichita State Shockers women's basketball team
- University: Wichita State University
- Head coach: Terry Nooner (4th season)
- Location: Wichita, Kansas
- Arena: Charles Koch Arena (capacity: 10,506)
- Conference: The American
- Nickname: Shockers
- Colors: Black and yellow

NCAA Division I tournament appearances
- 2013, 2014, 2015

Conference tournament champions
- 2013, 2014, 2015

Conference regular-season champions
- 2013, 2014, 2015

Uniforms
Home	Away	Alternate

The Wichita State Shockers women's basketball team is the NCAA Division I college basketball program representing Wichita State University in Wichita, Kansas. The team is a member of the American Conference (the American), after 43 seasons in the Missouri Valley Conference.

== History ==
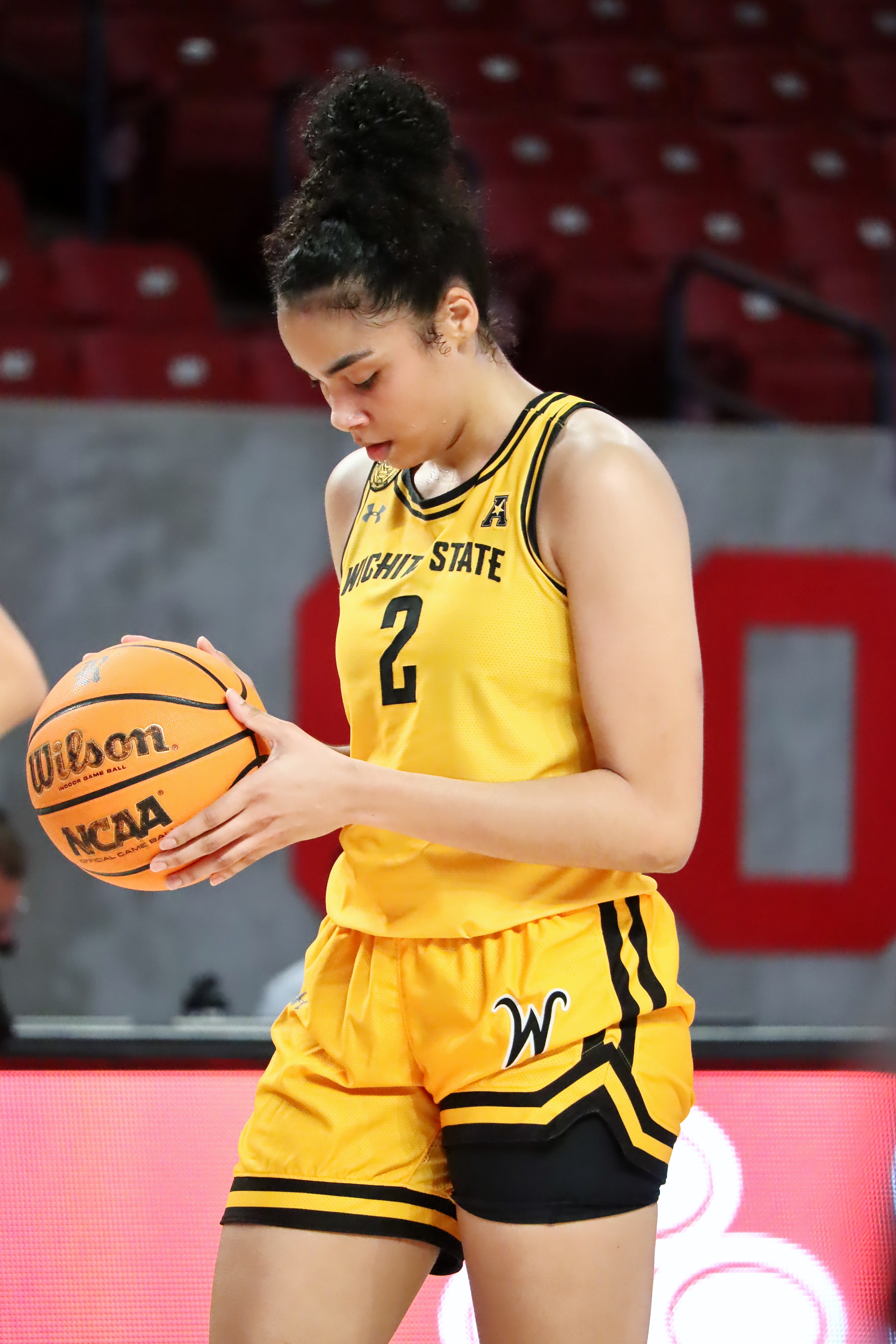
A Shockers women's basketball game in 2024

Wichita State began play in 1905. They have played in Division I since 1974. As of the end of the 2015–16 season, they have an all-time record of 556–631. They have made the NCAA Tournament in the three years they've won the Missouri Valley Conference title, in 2013, 2014, and 2015. They have made the WNIT four times 1999, 2000, 2011, 2012), and the WBI once (2010). Jody Adams had coached the team since 2008 (with the team winning a school record 29 games in 2014, though they finished with 8 wins the next season) until her departure was announced on January 22, 2017. Adams was replaced by Kansas native, Keitha Adams of University of Texas at El Paso (UTEP).

== NCAA tournament results ==
Year	Seed	Round	Opponent	Result
2013	No. 14	First Round	No. 3 Texas A&M	L 45–71
2014	No. 14	First Round	No. 3 Penn State	L 56–62
2015	No. 13	First Round	No. 4 California	L 66–78
