= UTEP Miners women's basketball =

UTEP Miners
| 2025–26 UTEP Miners women's basketball team |
- University: University of Texas at El Paso
- Head coach: Keitha Adams (3rd season in 2nd stint, 19th overall season)
- Location: El Paso, Texas
- Arena: Don Haskins Center (capacity: 12,222)
- Conference: Mountain West
- Nickname: Miners
- Colors: Dark blue, orange, and silver accent

NCAA Division I tournament round of 32
- 2008

NCAA Division I tournament appearances
- 2008, 2012

Conference tournament champions
- 2012

Conference regular-season champions
- 2008, 2012, 2016

Uniforms
| Home | Away | Alternate |

The UTEP Miners women's basketball team represents University of Texas at El Paso in women's basketball. The school competes in the Mountain West Conference in Division I of the National Collegiate Athletic Association (NCAA). The Miners play home basketball games at Don Haskins Center in El Paso, Texas. Keitha Adams enters her second stint as head coach in 2023, returning after coaching the Miners from 2001 to 2017.

== History ==
As of the end of the 2022–23 season, the Lady Miners have a 638–734 all-time record.

| Season | Coach | Record | Conference Record | League finish |
|---|---|---|---|---|
| 1974–75 | Carol Ammerman | 11–5 | n/a | No record on file |
| 1975–76 | Carol Ammerman | 6–11 | 3–11 | No record on file |
| 1976–77 | Carol Ammerman | 13–12 | 4–9 | No record on file |
| 1977–78 | Carol Ammerman | 7–18 | 3–10 | No record on file |
| 1978–79 | Wayne Thornton | 9–16 | 1–11 | No record on file |
| 1979–80 | Janet Wood | 11–16 | 2–8 | No record on file |
| 1980–81 | Janet Wood | 14–14 | 4–6 | No record on file |
| 1981–82 | Janet Wood | 4–21 | 1–9 | No record on file |
| 1982–83 | Janet Wood | 4–20 | n/a | No record on file |
| 1983–84 | Janet Wood | 8–19 | 2–8 | No record on file |
| 1984–85 | Janet Wood | 4–24 | 1–9 | No record on file |
| 1985–86 | Janet Wood | 6–22 | n/a | No record on file |
| 1986–87 | Ken Weeks | 7–17 | n/a | Independent |
| 1987–88 | Craig Roden | 8–19 | n/a | Independent |
| 1988–89 | Craig Roden | 16–14 | n/a | Independent |
| 1989–90 | Craig Roden | 12–16 | n/a | Independent |
| 1990–91 | Sandra Rushing | 5–22 | 2–10 | 7th in WAC |
| 1991–92 | Sandra Rushing | 11–17 | 4–10 | 6th in WAC |
| 1992–93 | Sandra Rushing | 18–10 | 8–6 | 4th in WAC |
| 1993–94 | Sandra Rushing | 10–16 | 5–9 | T-5th in WAC |
| 1994–95 | Sandra Rushing | 13–15 | 6–8 | t4th in WAC |
| 1995–96 | Sandra Rushing | 12–15 | 3–11 | T-7th in WAC |
| 1996–97 | Sandra Rushing | 13–12 | 5–11 | 7th in WAC Mountain |
| 1997–98 | Sandra Rushing | 16–11 | 10–6 | 3rd in WAC Mountain |
| 1998–99 | Sandra Rushing | 12–15 | 6–8 | 5th in WAC Pacific |
| 1999-00 | Sandra Rushing | 5–22 | 2–12 | 7th in WAC |
| 2000–01 | Sandra Rushing | 8–20 | 4–12 | T-7th in WAC |
| 2001–02 | Keitha Adams | 3–25 | 1–17 | 10th in WAC |
| 2002–03 | Keitha Adams | 10–19 | 5–13 | 9th in WAC |
| 2003–04 | Keitha Adams | 16–13 | 10–8 | 4th in WAC |
| 2004–05 | Keitha Adams | 12–17 | 7–11 | T-7th in WAC |
| 2005–06 | Keitha Adams | 14–15 | 6–10 | T-7th in C-USA |
| 2006–07 | Keitha Adams | 22–8 | 10–6 | T-4th C-USA |
| 2007–08 | Keitha Adams | 28–4 | 16–0 | 1st in C-USA |
| 2008–09 | Keitha Adams | 18–12 | 11–5 | 2nd in C-USA |
| 2009–10 | Keitha Adams | 16–16 | 6–10 | 10th in C-USA |
| 2010–11 | Keitha Adams | 16–14 | 7–9 | 9th in C-USA |
| 2011–12 | Keitha Adams | 29–4 | 15–1 | 1st in C-USA |
| 2012–13 | Keitha Adams | 22–10 | 8–8 | 5th in C-USA |
| 2013–14 | Keitha Adams | 29–8 | 12–4 | 3rd in C-USA |
| 2014–15 | Keitha Adams | 12–16 | 7–11 | 11th in C-USA |
| 2015–16 | Keitha Adams | 29–5 | 16–2 | 1st in C-USA |
| 2016–17 | Keitha Adams | 8–23 | 5–13 | T-11th in C-USA |
| 2017–18 | Kevin Baker | 17–14 | 7–9 | T-7th in C-USA |
| 2018–19 | Kevin Baker | 9–22 | 5–7 | 11th in C-USA |
| 2019–20 | Kevin Baker | 16–14 | 8–10 | 7th in C-USA |
| 2020–21 | Kevin Baker | 17–8 | 13–5 | 2nd in C-USA West |
| 2021–22 | Kevin Baker | 14–15 | 6–12 | 11th in C-USA |
| 2022–23 | Kevin Baker | 20–12 | 12–8 | 4th in C-USA |
| 2023–24 | Keitha Adams | 12–19 | 6–10 | 8th in C-USA |

== Postseason appearances ==
=== NCAA tournament ===
| Year | Seed | Round | Opponent | Result |
|---|---|---|---|---|
| 2008 | #7 | First Round; Second Round | #10 Western Kentucky #2 Stanford | W 92–60; L 54–88 |
| 2012 | #13 | First Round | #4 Penn State | L 77–85 |

=== WNIT ===
| Year | Round | Opponent | Result |
|---|---|---|---|
| 2014 | First Round; Second Round; Third Round; Quarterfinals; Semifinals; Championship | Arkansas State; St. Mary's; Colorado; Washington; South Dakota State; Rutgers | W 74–64; W 76–64; W 68–60; W 73–63; W 66–63; L 54–56 |
| 2016 | First Round; Second Round; Third Round; Quarterfinals | Abilene Christian; Arkansas State; TCU; Oregon | W 66–62; W 74–68; W 79–70; L 67–71 |
