= 2024–25 Mississippi State Bulldogs women's basketball team =

Intercollegiate basketball season

2024–25 Mississippi State Bulldogs women's basketball
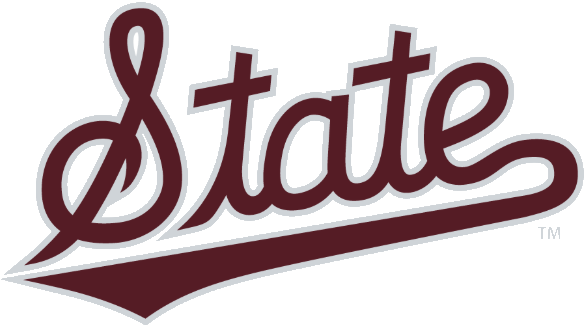

NCAA tournament, Second round
- Conference: Southeastern Conference
- Record: 22–12 (7–9 SEC)
- Head coach: Sam Purcell (3rd season)
- Assistant coaches: Fred Castro; Tony Dukes; Anita Howard; Victoria Vivians; Samantha Williams
- Home arena: Humphrey Coliseum

2024–25 SEC women's basketball standings
	Conf.				Overall
Team	W		L	PCT	W		L	PCT
No. 2 South Carolina †	15	–	1	.938	35	–	4	.897
No. 5 Texas	15	–	1	.938	35	–	4	.897
No. 10 LSU	12	–	4	.750	31	–	6	.838
No. 13 Kentucky	11	–	5	.688	23	–	8	.742
No. 11 Oklahoma	11	–	5	.688	27	–	8	.771
No. 21 Alabama	10	–	6	.625	24	–	9	.727
No. 25 Ole Miss	10	–	6	.625	22	–	11	.667
Vanderbilt	8	–	8	.500	22	–	11	.667
No. 20 Tennessee	8	–	8	.500	24	–	10	.706
Mississippi State	7	–	9	.438	22	–	12	.647
Florida	5	–	11	.313	19	–	18	.514
Georgia	4	–	12	.250	13	–	19	.406
Arkansas	3	–	13	.188	10	–	22	.313
Auburn	3	–	13	.188	12	–	18	.400
Missouri	3	–	13	.188	14	–	18	.438
Texas A&M	3	–	13	.188	10	–	19	.345
† 2025 SEC tournament winner Rankings from AP poll

The 2024–25 Mississippi State Bulldogs women's basketball team represented Mississippi State University during the 2024–25 NCAA Division I women's basketball season. The Bulldogs, led by third-year head coach Sam Purcell, played their home games at Humphrey Coliseum and competed as members of the Southeastern Conference (SEC).

== Previous season ==
The Bulldogs finished the season 23–12 (8–8 SEC) to finish in a tie for seventh place in the conference. They received a bid to the inaugural WBIT, where they defeated Georgia Tech and TCU before falling to Penn State in the quarterfinals.

== Offseason ==
=== Departures ===
Mississippi State Departures
Name	Number	Pos.	Height	Year	Hometown	Notes	Ref
Darrione Rogers	0	G	5'11"	Senior	Chicago, Illinois	Transferred to Miami (FL)	
Nyayongah Gony	1	F	6'4"	RS Junior	Omaha, Nebraska	Transferred to UTSA	
Lauren Park-Lane	3	G	5'3"	Graduate Student	Wilmington, Delaware	Graduated	
Jessika Carter	4	C	6'5"	Graduate Student	Waverly Hall, Georgia	Drafted 23rd overall by the New York Liberty	
Erynn Barnum	5	F	6'2"	Graduate Student	Little Rock, Arkansas	Graduated	
Mjracle Sheppard	14	G	5'10"	Freshman	Kent, Washington	Transferred to LSU	
Jasmine Brown-Hagger	22	G	5'9"	Freshman	Shorewood, Illinois	Transferred to Illinois	
Ramani Parker	23	F	6'4"	RS Senior	Fresno, California	Transferred to Seton Hall	

=== 2024 recruiting class ===
College recruiting information
Name	Hometown	School	Height	Weight	Commit date
Tahj-Monet Bloom; F	Okinawa, Japan	DME Academy	6 ft 2 in (1.88 m)	N/A	
Tahj-Monet Bloom; F	Recruit ratings: ESPN: (94)				
Shakirah Edwards; G	Panama City, Florida	Rutherford HS	5 ft 10 in (1.78 m)	N/A	
Shakirah Edwards; G	Recruit ratings: ESPN: (91)				
Anaisha Carriere; G/F	Gulfport, Mississippi	Harrison Central HS	6 ft 2 in (1.88 m)	N/A	
Anaisha Carriere; G/F	Recruit ratings: No ratings found				
Rocío Jiménez; C	Elías Piña, Dominican Republic	Central Pointe Christian Academy	6 ft 7 in (2.01 m)	N/A	
Rocío Jiménez; C	Recruit ratings: No ratings found				
Overall recruit ranking:
Note: In many cases, Scout, Rivals, 247Sports, On3, and ESPN may conflict in their listings of height and weight.; In these cases, the average was taken. ESPN grades are on a 100-point scale.; Sources:

=== Incoming transfers ===
Mississippi State incoming transfers
Name	Number	Pos.	Height	Year	Hometown	Previous school
Denim DeShields	0	G	5'5"	Junior	Atlanta, Georgia	UAB
Destiney McPhaul	1	G	5'9"	RS Junior	Philadelphia, Pennsylvania	Northwest Florida State College
Terren Ward	3	G/F	5'11"	Graduate Student	Jesup, Georgia	Georgia Southern
Eniya Russell	4	G/F	6'0"	Graduate Student	Baltimore, Maryland	Kentucky
Chandler Prater	5	G/F	5'10"	Graduate Student	Kansas City, Missouri	Oklahoma State
Kayla Thomas	14	F	6'2"	Senior	Beltsville, Maryland	Georgia Southern
Madina Okot	15	C	6'6"	Junior	Mumias, Kenya	Zetech

== Roster ==
2024–25 Mississippi State Bulldogs women's basketball team
Players
Coaches

Pos.	#	Name	Height	Year	Previous school	Hometown
G	0	Denim DeShields	5 ft 5 in (1.65 m)	Jr	McEachern HS; UAB	Atlanta, GA
G	1	Destiney McPhaul	5 ft 9 in (1.75 m)	RS Jr	West Catholic Prep; Northwest Florida State College	Philadelphia, PA
G	2	JerKaila Jordan	5 ft 10 in (1.78 m)	GS	John Curtis Christian School; Tulane	New Orleans, LA
G/F	3	Terren Ward	5 ft 11 in (1.8 m)	GS	Wayne County HS; Georgia Southern	Jesup, GA
G/F	4	Eniya Russell	6 ft 0 in (1.83 m)	GS	St. Vincent Pallotti HS; Kentucky	Baltimore, MD
G/F	5	Chandler Prater	5 ft 10 in (1.78 m)	GS	North Kansas City HS; Oklahoma State	Kansas City, MO
G	6	Shakirah Edwards	5 ft 10 in (1.78 m)	Fr	Rutherford HS	Panama City, FL
G/F	8	Anaisha Carriere	6 ft 2 in (1.88 m)	Fr	Harrison Central HS	Gulfport, MS
F	11	Tahj-Monet Bloom	6 ft 2 in (1.88 m)	Fr	DME Academy	Okinawa, Japan
C	13	Rocío Jiménez	6 ft 7 in (2.01 m)	RS Fr	Central Pointe Christian Academy	Elías Piña, Dominican Republic
F	14	Kayla Thomas	6 ft 2 in (1.88 m)	Sr	Emerge Christian Academy; Georgia Southern	Beltsville, MD
C	15	Madina Okot	6 ft 6 in (1.98 m)	Jr	Kaya Tiwi Secondary School; Zetech	Mumias, Kenya
G/F	21	Debreasha Powe	6 ft 1 in (1.85 m)	Jr	Meridian HS	Meridian, MS
F	24	Quanirah Montague	6 ft 5 in (1.96 m)	So	Atlantic City HS	Atlantic City, NJ

Head coach

- Sam Purcell (Auburn)

Assistant coach(es)

- Fred Castro (Oklahoma)
- Tony Dukes (Clayton State)
- Anita Howard (Armstrong State)
- Victoria Vivians (Mississippi State)
- Samantha Williams (Auburn)

Legend

- (C) Team captain
- (S) Suspended
- (I) Ineligible
- (W) Walk-on
- Injured
- Current redshirt

Roster

== Schedule and results ==
Date time, TV	Rank^{#}	Opponent^{#}	Result	Record	High points	High rebounds	High assists	Site (attendance) city, state
Non-conference regular season
November 7, 2024*; 6:30 pm, SECN+/ESPN+		Memphis	W 100–56	1–0	26 – Russell	17 – Okot	4 – Powe	Humphrey Coliseum (4,971); Starkville, MS
November 10, 2024*; 2:00 pm, SECN+/ESPN+		Alcorn State	W 73–45	2–0	20 – Jordan	10 – Russell	4 – Jordan	Humphrey Coliseum (4,504); Starkville, MS
November 13, 2024*; 11:00 am, SECN+/ESPN+		Alabama State	W 83–29	3–0	17 – Okot	12 – Okot	8 – Russell	Humphrey Coliseum (6,585); Starkville, MS
November 17, 2024*; 2:00 pm, SECN+/ESPN+		Chattanooga	W 69–44	4–0	19 – Russell	8 – Jordan	4 – Russell	Humphrey Coliseum (4,037); Starkville, MS
November 20, 2024*; 6:30 pm, SECN+/ESPN+		Mercer	W 81–44	5–0	15 – Tied	11 – Jordan	6 – Russell	Humphrey Coliseum (4,003); Starkville, MS
November 24, 2024*; 2:30 pm		vs. Jacksonville; WBCA Showcase	W 80–35	6–0	17 – Montague	10 – Jordan	4 – Tied	State Farm Field House (1,310); Bay Lake, FL
November 28, 2024*; 6:30 pm, FloHoops		vs. Utah; Cayman Islands Classic	W 66–62	7–0	15 – Okot	8 – Okot	6 – DeShields	John Gray Gymnasium (802); George Town, Cayman Islands
November 29, 2024*; 6:30 pm, FloHoops		vs. South Florida; Cayman Islands Classic	W 59–52	8–0	20 – Jordan	8 – Montague	5 – DeShields	John Gray Gymnasium (1,034); George Town, Cayman Islands
December 4, 2024*; 6:15 pm, ACCN		at Georgia Tech; ACC–SEC Challenge	L 75–78	8–1	25 – Jordan	9 – Russell	9 – Russell	McCamish Pavilion (1,514); Atlanta, GA
December 8, 2024*; 5:00 pm, ESPN+		at Chicago State	W 102–42	9–1	21 – Jordan	11 – Tied	7 – DeShields	Jones Convocation Center (235); Chicago, IL
December 14, 2024*; 2:00 pm, SECN+/ESPN+		vs. Belmont; Magnolia Madness	W 73–70	10–1	24 – Jordan	15 – Tied	3 – Russell	Cadence Bank Arena (N/A); Tupelo, MS
December 17, 2024*; 5:00 pm, ESPN+		at Louisiana–Monroe	W 78–70	11–1	23 – Jordan	14 – Okot	6 – DeShields	Fant–Ewing Coliseum (1,095); Monroe, LA
December 20, 2024*; 11:00 am		at Maryland Eastern Shore	W 70–52	12–1	26 – Okot	10 – Russell	6 – Russell	Hytche Athletic Center (400); Princess Anne, MD
December 29, 2024*; 2:00 pm, SECN+/ESPN+		South Carolina State	W 95–47	13–1	16 – Okot	8 – Prater	9 – DeShields	Humphrey Coliseum (4,271); Starkville, MS
SEC regular season
January 2, 2025; 6:00 pm, SECN+/ESPN+		at No. 16 Kentucky	L 69–91	13–2 (0–1)	17 – Jordan	6 – Tied	6 – McPhaul	Memorial Coliseum (4,493); Lexington, KY
January 5, 2025; 1:00 pm, SECN		No. 2 South Carolina	L 68–95	13–3 (0–2)	24 – Jordan	8 – Okot	3 – DeShields	Humphrey Coliseum (6,164); Starkville, MS
January 9, 2025; 6:30 pm, SECN+/ESPN+		No. 10 Oklahoma	W 81–77	14–3 (1–2)	24 – Jordan	10 – Okot	3 – Tied	Humphrey Coliseum (4,316); Starkville, MS
January 12, 2025; 1:00 pm, SECN+/ESPN+		at Georgia	W 79–68	15–3 (2–2)	21 – Russell	12 – Okot	9 – Russell	Stegeman Coliseum (3,410); Athens, GA
January 16, 2025; 6:00 pm, SECN		at No. 15 Tennessee	L 73–86	15–4 (2–3)	17 – Jordan	11 – Okot	7 – McPhaul	Thompson–Boling Arena (9,018); Knoxville, TN
January 19, 2025; 2:00 pm, SECN		Ole Miss	L 63–71	15–5 (2–4)	19 – Jordan	12 – Okot	5 – McPhaul	Humphrey Coliseum (6,925); Starkville, MS
January 23, 2025; 6:30 pm, SECN+/ESPN+		Auburn	W 96–56	16–5 (3–4)	15 – Tied	9 – Okot	7 – DeShields	Humphrey Coliseum (4,652); Starkville, MS
January 27, 2025; 7:00 pm, SECN		at Missouri	L 77–78	16–6 (3–5)	40 – Jordan	11 – Okot	4 – Tied	Mizzou Arena (2,514); Columbia, MO
February 2, 2025; 1:00 pm, SECN		at No. 7 LSU	L 67–81	16–7 (3–6)	13 – Russell	10 – Okot	4 – Russell	Pete Maravich Assembly Center (11,275); Baton Rouge, LA
February 6, 2025; 6:30 pm, SECN+/ESPN+		Arkansas	W 78–55	17–7 (4–6)	16 – Tied	11 – Okot	4 – Powe	Humphrey Coliseum (6,588); Starkville, MS
February 9, 2025; 1:00 pm, SECN		No. 23 Alabama	L 60–80	17–8 (4–7)	14 – Powe	7 – Okot	4 – Jordan	Humphrey Coliseum (4,554); Starkville, MS
February 13, 2025; 8:00 pm, SECN		at Vanderbilt	W 85–77 ^{2OT}	18–8 (5–7)	21 – Tied	23 – Okot	4 – DeShields	Memorial Gymnasium (3,577); Nashville, TN
February 16, 2025; 1:00 pm, SECN+/ESPN+		at Florida	L 66–69	18–9 (5–8)	15 – DeShields	5 – Tied	3 – Tied	O'Connell Center (2,044); Gainesville, FL
February 23, 2025; 2:00 pm, SECN+/ESPN+		Texas A&M	W 81–55	19–9 (6–8)	19 – Powe	12 – Okot	5 – Russell	Humphrey Coliseum (4,696); Starkville, MS
February 27, 2025; 6:30 pm, SECN+/ESPN+		No. 1 Texas	L 64–68	19–10 (6–9)	14 – Jordan	6 – Tied	4 – DeShields	Humphrey Coliseum (5,263); Starkville, MS
March 2, 2025; 2:00 pm, SECN+/ESPN+		at Auburn	W 73–66	20–10 (7–9)	19 – Russell	14 – Okot	3 – Jordan	Neville Arena (3,317); Auburn, AL
SEC Tournament
March 5, 2025; 5:00 pm, SECN	(10)	vs. (15) Missouri; First Round	W 75–55	21–10	21 – Jordan	8 – Tied	5 – Prater	Bon Secours Wellness Arena (4,953); Greenville, SC
March 6, 2025; 5:00 pm, SECN	(10)	vs. (7) Ole Miss; Second Round	L 73–85	21–11	14 – Tied	10 – Okot	2 – Tied	Bon Secours Wellness Arena (5,127); Greenville, SC
NCAA Tournament
March 22, 2025*; 4:30 pm, ESPN2	(9 S4)	vs. (8 S4) California; First round	W 59–46	22–11	14 – Tied	13 – Okot	4 – Prater	Galen Center (6,865); Los Angeles, CA
March 24, 2025*; 9:00 pm, ESPN	(9 S4)	at (1 S4) No. 4 USC; Second round	L 59–96	22–12	17 – Jordan	6 – Tied	3 – McPhaul	Galen Center (7,808); Los Angeles, CA
*Non-conference game. ^{#}Rankings from AP Poll. (#) Tournament seedings in parentheses. S4=Spokane 4. All times are in Central Time.

== See also ==
- 2024–25 Mississippi State Bulldogs men's basketball team
