= Jessika Carter =

American basketball player (born 1999)

Panteras
- Position: Center
- League: LNBPF

Personal information
- Born: December 7, 1999 (age 26)
- Listed height: 6 ft 5 in (1.96 m)
- Listed weight: 195 lb (88 kg)

Career information
- High school: Harris County (Hamilton, Georgia)
- College: Mississippi State (2018–2024)
- WNBA draft: 2024: 2nd round, 23rd overall pick
- Drafted by: New York Liberty

Career history
- 2024: Las Vegas Aces
- 2024–2026: AZS Poznań
- 2026–: Panteras

Career highlights
- WBCA All-Region II Team (2020); Second Team All-SEC (2023); SEC All-Defensive Team (2023); Gillom Trophy (2024)
- Stats at WNBA.com
- Stats at Basketball Reference
Medals
Representing United States
Women's basketball
FISU World University Games
Silver medal – second place	2019 Summer Games

Jessika Tyneisha Carter (born December 7, 1999) is an American professional basketball player for Panteras of the LNBPF. She was drafted by the New York Liberty in the 2024 WNBA draft. She played college basketball for the Mississippi State Bulldogs.

== Early life ==
Carter was born in Waverly Hall, Georgia to Patrick Ransom and Angelia Carter-Ransom. She has one brother, Kenavez Bryd, and five sisters: Lvvie, Jhernie, Zi, Nyazjha, and Molly.

She attended the Girls Inc. Baker Center in South Columbus, Georgia and considers it "home." Instead of attending the WNBA draft, she hosted a draft party there instead. She used to be a model.

She attended and played basketball at Harris County High School in Hamilton, Georgia. Her head coach was Steffanie Ramsey. She was rated 49th best player in the nation in the Olson ratings. She was named GWSA All-State First Team in the 5A class in 2015.

== College career ==
Throughout her career with the Mississippi State Bulldogs of Mississippi State University (MSU), she helped MSU become the first women's team to play in a First Four game and advance to the Second Round of the NCAA Tournament. She had 24 career games with at least 10 rebounds, and scored 20+ points in a game 14 times in her five years. She scored her 1,000th career point in December 2022, becoming the 28th member of the 1,000-point club at Mississippi State. She played under three head coaches: Vic Schaefer, Nikki McCray-Penson, and Sam Purcell.

During the 2018–19 season, in her first year, she ranked 11th in the Southeastern Conference (SEC) in blocks per game with an average of 1.03.

During the 2019–20 season, in her second year, she averaged 8.7 rebounds, 1.8 blocks, 58.5% field goal scoring, and 11 double-doubles. Carter was named Second Team All-SEC and Duel in the Desert all-tournament honors. She was named SEC Player of the Week after the two games against the Murray State Racers and the Troy Trojans.

During the 2020–21 season, in her junior year, she averaged 14.3 points, 8.7 rebounds, and 1.4 blocks per game. She started in all 19 games for the MSU Bulldogs. She was a top-10 finalist for the Katrina McClain Award.

She was a redshirt reserve for her senior year during the 2021–22 season, and didn't play in any games.

During the 2022–23 season, she earned Second Team All-SEC honors and was named to the SEC All-Defensive Team. She played in 31 games and started in 30. She was named a finalist for the Lisa Leslie Award, an award given to the nation's best center. She averaged a career best of 14.8 points per game and had a career-high 65 blocks and 42 assists.

Carter played in four NCAA Tournament games, one in the 2018–19 season and three in the 2022–23 season. In the Tournament games, she averaged 11 points, 6.4 rebounds, and 1.8 blocks per game. She had a 56% shot rate from the floor and a 78% shot rate from the free throw line.

After five seasons at MSU, she finished as the program's all-time leader in games played and sixth in points scored, with 1,750 points total. She also ranked second in rebounds with 1,120 total rebounds, and third in blocks with 238. In 2024, she won the Gillom Trophy, which recognizes the best women's basketball player in the state of Mississippi. She declared for the WNBA draft in April 2024. Her then-head coach Sam Purcell described her as "a great player, [and] a phenomenal person and role model."

At MSU, she majored in kinesiology.

== Professional career ==
=== WNBA ===
Carter was drafted in the second round, 23rd overall, by the New York Liberty in the 2024 WNBA draft. She was the ninth player from Mississippi State to be drafted to the WNBA. On May 11, 2024, she was waived by the Liberty. On June 16, 2024, she was signed by the Las Vegas Aces. She appeared in two games for the Aces before being waived on June 30, 2024.

On April 17, 2025, Carter signed a training camp contract with the Chicago Sky. On May 11, she was waived by the Sky.

=== Overseas ===
Carter signed with AZS Poznań of the Basket Liga Kobiet for the 2024–25 season. In April 2025, she signed a one-year extension with AZS.

== National team career ==
She was on the USA Team for the 2019 World University Games, helping the team win a silver medal at the event. She averaged 11.7 points, 8.4 rebounds, and 0.7 blocks per game. She had 3.7 offensive rebounds per game.

== Career statistics ==
Legend
GP	Games played	GS	Games started	MPG	Minutes per game	RPG	Rebounds per game
APG	Assists per game	SPG	Steals per game	BPG	Blocks per game	PPG	Points per game
TO	Turnovers per game	FG%	Field-goal percentage	3P%	3-point field-goal percentage	FT%	Free-throw percentage
**Bold**	Career best	°	League leader

=== WNBA ===
==== Regular season ====
Stats current through end of 2024 season

WNBA regular season statistics
Year	Team	GP	GS	MPG	FG%	3P%	FT%	RPG	APG	SPG	BPG	TO	PPG
2024	Las Vegas	2	0	2.0	.000	—	.000	0.0	0.0	0.0	0.0	0.0	0.0
**Career**	1 year, 1 team	2	0	2.0	.000	—	.000	0.0	0.0	0.0	0.0	0.0	0.0

=== College ===
NCAA statistics
Year	Team	GP	GS	MPG	FG%	3P%	FT%	RPG	APG	SPG	BPG	TO	PPG
2018–19	Mississippi State	**36**	0	10.9	49.5	0.0	52.4	3.1	0.2	0.2	0.9	**0.6**	3.2
2019–20	Mississippi State	33	**33**	28.8	**58.5**	0.0	**71.1**	8.7	0.4	0.7	1.8	1.5	13.0
2020–21	Mississippi State	19	19	26.3	50.2	0.0	66.7	8.7	0.8	0.3	1.4	1.4	14.3
2021–22	Mississippi State	Did not play due to injury											
2022–23	Mississippi State	31	30	27.5	57.0	0.0	61.2	7.7	**1.4**	0.6	**2.1**	2.8	14.8
2023–24	Mississippi State	32	31	**31.4**	52.8	0.0	68.2	**9.9**	1.1	**0.7**	1.7	2.4	**14.9**
**Career**		151	113	24.5	54.4	0.0	65.4	7.4	0.8	0.5	1.6	1.7	11.6

== Personal life ==
In July 2021, Carter attempted suicide, suffered from liver damage, and was subsequently treated at a hospital for the following week. In September, she was arrested for an altercation involving another woman, where she was charged with simple assault. She was released on a $500 bond. The day after Thanksgiving, she attempted suicide a second time, and was admitted into treatment at a hospital again. After the two attempts, she spoke out on social media acknowledging her friends and family for "checking on [her] and helping [her] get out of a very dark space."

Carter is currently a graduate student at Mississippi State University.
