= 2024–25 NC State Wolfpack women's basketball team =

Intercollegiate basketball season

2024–25 NC State Wolfpack women's basketball

ACC regular season co-champions

NCAA tournament, Sweet Sixteen
- Conference: Atlantic Coast Conference

Ranking
- Coaches: No. 10
- AP: No. 9
- Record: 28–7 (16–2 ACC)
- Head coach: Wes Moore (12th season)
- Associate head coach: Nikki West (5th season)
- Assistant coaches: Brittany Morris (4th season); Ashley Williams (3rd season); Houston Fancher (7th season); Kevin Leatherwood (2nd season)
- Home arena: Reynolds Coliseum

2024–25 ACC women's basketball standings
	Conf.				Overall
Team	W		L	PCT	W		L	PCT
No. 9 NC State	16	–	2	.889	28	–	7	.800
No. 8 Notre Dame	16	–	2	.889	28	–	6	.824
No. 7 Duke †	14	–	4	.778	29	–	8	.784
No. 22 Florida State	13	–	5	.722	24	–	9	.727
No. 12 North Carolina	13	–	5	.722	29	–	8	.784
Louisville	13	–	5	.722	22	–	11	.667
California	12	–	6	.667	25	–	9	.735
Virginia Tech	9	–	9	.500	19	–	13	.594
Georgia Tech	9	–	9	.500	22	–	11	.667
Virginia	8	–	10	.444	17	–	15	.531
Stanford	8	–	10	.444	16	–	15	.516
Boston College	6	–	12	.333	16	–	18	.471
Syracuse	6	–	12	.333	12	–	18	.400
Clemson	6	–	12	.333	14	–	17	.452
Pittsburgh	5	–	13	.278	13	–	19	.406
Miami (FL)	4	–	14	.222	14	–	15	.483
Wake Forest	2	–	16	.111	9	–	20	.310
SMU	2	–	16	.111	10	–	20	.333
† 2025 ACC tournament winner Rankings from AP Poll

The 2024–25 NC State Wolfpack women's basketball team represented North Carolina State University during the 2024–25 NCAA Division I women's basketball season. The Wolfpack were led by twelfth-year head coach Wes Moore, and played their home games at Reynolds Coliseum as members of the Atlantic Coast Conference.

The Wolfpack begain the season ranked ninth in the AP poll, and defeated East Tennessee State on the first day of the season. They then traveled to Charlotte to face number one South Carolina in the Ally Tipoff. They lost the game 71–57 and fell to thirteenth in the rankings. A 76–73 loss at TCU saw them fall to number twenty. They defeated Coastal Carolina before traveling to the Bahamas to participate in the Pink Flamingo Championship. There, they defeated Southern before losing in the championship game to seventh ranked LSU. The loss saw them fall out of the rankings for the first time during the season. They returned to North Carolina and defeated eighteenth ranked Ole Miss 68–61 in the ACC–SEC Challenge. This win sparked a seven-game winning streak for the Wolfpack which saw them return to the rankings. They did not defeat another ranked team during the stretch, but they did win their ACC opener against Louisville in the Jimmy V Classic. The closest game of the streak was a four-point win over Clemson. A 78–71 loss at twenty-fourth ranked California ended the streak. However, the Wolfpack went on a nine-game winning streak after the loss. By the end of the streak, the Wolfpack had risen to tenth in the rankings. The streak included wins over tenth ranked Duke and twenty-second ranked Florida State. It also included single digit wins over Wake Forest and Miami. The streak was broken with a 66–65 loss at twelfth ranked North Carolina. The Wolfpack fell to thirteenth in the rankings before defeating twentieth ranked Georgia Tech and a double-overtime victory over number one ranked Notre Dame 104–95. The Wolfpack won their final two games of the regular season over Wake Forest and SMU.

The Wolfpack finished the regular season 24–5 overall and 16–2 in ACC play to finish in a tie for first place. As the first seed in the ACC tournament, they earned a bye into the quarterfinals, where they defeated ninth seed Georgia Tech, 73–72. They matched up with fifth seed and fourteenth ranked North Carolina in the Semifinals. They avenged their regular season loss by winning 66–55. The Wolfpack were defeated by third seed and eleventh ranked Duke in the Final, 76–62. They received an at-large bid to the NCAA tournament, and were the two-seed in the Spokane 1 region. They defeated fifteen-seed Vermont and seven-seed Michigan State at home to advance to the Sweet Sixteen. There, they faced three seed and tenth ranked LSU in a re-match of their Pink Flamingo Championship game. They lost again to LSU, this time 80–73 to end their season. The Wolfpack finished the season with a 28–7 record, and ranked ninth in the AP poll and tenth in the Coaches polls.

== Previous season ==
The Wolfpack finished the season 31–7 overall and 13–5 in ACC play to finish in a three-way tie for second place. As the second seed in the ACC tournament, they earned a bye into the quarterfinals, where they defeated seventh seed Duke. They defeated sixth seed Florida State to reach the finals. They could not prevail in a low-scoring game, and lost 51–55. They received an at-large invitation to the NCAA Tournament, marking the sixth straight time the Wolfpack qualified for the tournament. As the third seed in the Portland 4 region they defeated fourteenth seed Chattanooga in the first round, sixth seed Tennessee in the second round, second seed Stanford in the Sweet 16, and regional first seed Texas in the Elite Eight to qualify for the second Final Four in program history. In the Final Four, they could not overcome overall first seed South Carolina and lost 78–59 to end their season.

== Off-season ==
=== Departures ===
Departures
Name	Number	Pos.	Height	Year	Hometown	Reason for departure
River Baldwin	1	C	6'5"	Graduate student	Andalusia, Alabama	Graduated
Mimi Collins	2	F	6'3"	Graduate student	Slidell, Louisiana	Graduated
Alyssa Lewis	4	G	5'7"	Freshman	Harrisburg, North Carolina	Transferred to Queens
Katie Peneueta	20	F	6'2"	Junior	Vancouver, Washington	Transferred to Sacramento State
Jannah Eissa	30	G	5'8"	Freshman	Cairo, Egypt	Transferred to Cleveland State

=== Incoming transfers ===
Incoming transfers
Name	Number	Pos.	Height	Year	Hometown	Previous school
Caitlin Weimar	12	G	6'4"	Graduate student	Cortlandt Manor, New York	Boston University

=== Recruiting class ===
College recruiting
Name	Hometown	School	Height	Weight	Commit date
Lorena Awou; C	East Moline, Illinois	United Township	6 ft 5 in (1.96 m)	N/A	Oct 11, 2023
Lorena Awou; C	Recruit ratings: ESPN: (NR)				
Zamareya Jones; PG	Bethel, North Carolina	North Pitt	5 ft 7 in (1.70 m)	N/A	Nov 1, 2023
Zamareya Jones; PG	Recruit ratings: ESPN: (96)				
Devyn Quigley; G	Manchester, New Jersey	Manchester Township	5 ft 11 in (1.80 m)	N/A	Oct 10, 2023
Devyn Quigley; G	Recruit ratings: ESPN: (94)				
Tilda Trygger; F	Stockholm, Sweden	NB Paterna	6 ft 6 in (1.98 m)	N/A	Jan 12, 2024
Tilda Trygger; F	Recruit ratings: ESPN: (NR)				
Overall recruit ranking:
Note: In many cases, Scout, Rivals, 247Sports, On3, and ESPN may conflict in their listings of height and weight.; In these cases, the average was taken. ESPN grades are on a 100-point scale.; Sources:

== Roster ==
2024–25 NC State Wolfpack women's basketball team
Players
Coaches

Pos.	#	Name	Height	Year	Previous school	Hometown
G	0	Devyn Quigley	5 ft 11 in (1.8 m)	Fr	Manchester Township	Manchester, NJ
C	1	Lorena Awou	6 ft 5 in (1.96 m)	Fr	United Township	East Moline, IL
G	3	Zamareya Jones	5 ft 7 in (1.7 m)	Fr	North Pitt	Bethel, NC
G	10	Aziaha James	5 ft 9 in (1.75 m)	Sr	Princess Anne	Virginia Beach, VA
F	11	Maddie Cox	6 ft 2 in (1.88 m)	So	Flower Mound	Flower Mound, TX
F	12	Caitlin Weimar	6 ft 4 in (1.93 m)	GS	Hendrick Hudson; Boston University	Cortlandt Manor, NY
C	15	Lizzy Williamson	6 ft 5 in (1.96 m)	GS	Westminster; Southern Utah	Adelaide, Australia
F	18	Tilda Trygger	6 ft 6 in (1.98 m)	Fr	NB Paterna	Stockholm, Sweden
G	21	Madison Hayes	6 ft 0 in (1.83 m)	GS	East Hamilton; Mississippi State	Chattanooga, TN
G	22	Saniya Rivers	6 ft 1 in (1.85 m)	Sr	Eugene Ashley; South Carolina	Wilmington, NC
G	24	Laci Steele	5 ft 11 in (1.8 m)	So	Edmond North	Edmond, OK
G	35	Zoe Brooks	5 ft 10 in (1.78 m)	So	St. John Vianney	Plainfield, NJ
C	42	Mallory Collier	6 ft 3 in (1.91 m)	So	Bartlett	Millington, TN

Head coach

- Wes Moore (Johnson)

Assistant coach(es)

- Kikki West (Clemson)
- Brittany Moris (Seton Hall)
- Ashley Williams (NC State)
- Houston Fancher (Middle Tennessee)
- Kevin Leatherwood (Carson–Newman)

Legend

- (C) Team captain
- (S) Suspended
- (I) Ineligible
- (W) Walk-on
- Injured
- Current redshirt

Roster

== Schedule and results ==
Date time, TV	Rank^{#}	Opponent^{#}	Result	Record	High points	High rebounds	High assists	Site (attendance) city, state
Exhibition
October 29, 2024*; 7:00 p.m.	No. 9	Anderson	W 91–54	–	19 – Jones	10 – Rivers	5 – Rivers	Reynolds Coliseum (1,225); Raleigh, NC
Regular season
November 5, 2024*; 7:00 p.m., ACCNX/ESPN+	No. 9	East Tennessee State	W 80–55	1–0	21 – Brooks	9 – James	4 – Brooks	Reynolds Coliseum (4,291); Raleigh, NC
November 10, 2024*; 3:00 p.m., ESPN	No. 9	vs. No. 1 South Carolina; Ally Tipoff	L 57–71	1–1	16 – Jones	7 – Rivers	3 – James	Spectrum Center (15,424); Charlotte, NC
November 14, 2024*; 7:00 p.m., ACCNX/ESPN+	No. 13	Kent State	W 79–51	2–1	20 – James	9 – James	4 – James	Reynolds Coliseum (4,368); Raleigh, NC
November 17, 2024*; 3:00 p.m., ESPN	No. 13	at TCU	L 73–76	2–2	27 – James	6 – Brooks	3 – Brooks	Schollmaier Arena (3,220); Fort Worth, TX
November 21, 2024*; 5:00 p.m., ACCNX/ESPN+	No. 20	Coastal Carolina	W 89–68	3–2	21 – James	9 – Awou	5 – Tied	Reynolds Coliseum (4,206); Raleigh, NC
November 25, 2024*; 11:00 a.m., FloHoops	No. 20	vs. Southern; Pink Flamingo Championship semifinals	W 77–47	4–2	17 – Brooks	7 – Tied	5 – Jones	Baha Mar Convention Center (267); Nassau, Bahamas
November 27, 2024*; 1:30 p.m., FloHoops	No. 20	vs. No. 7 LSU; Pink Flamingo Championship finals	L 65–82	4–3	21 – Rivers	6 – Collier	4 – James	Baha Mar Convention Center (327); Nassau, Bahamas
December 5, 2024*; 7:00 p.m., ESPN2		No. 18 Ole Miss; ACC–SEC Challenge	W 68–61	5–3	19 – Brooks	9 – Tied	4 – Rivers	Reynolds Coliseum (5,500); Raleigh, NC
December 8, 2024*; 2:00 p.m., ACCNX/ESPN+		Old Dominion	W 86–55	6–3	15 – Jones	8 – Hayes	4 – Tied	Reynolds Coliseum (5,500); Raleigh, NC
December 11, 2024*; 7:00 p.m., ACCN	No. 22т	Davidson	W 59–57	7–3	25 – Rivers	11 – Rivers	1 – Tied	Reynolds Coliseum (4,789); Raleigh, NC
December 15, 2024; 1:00 p.m., ABC	No. 22т	at Louisville; Jimmy V Classic	W 72–42	8–3 (1–0)	18 – Jones	13 – Rivers	5 – James	KFC Yum! Center (9,116); Louisville, KY
December 19, 2024*; 7:00 p.m., ACCNX/ESPN+	No. 21	James Madison	W 61–47	9–3	21 – James	7 – Trygger	6 – Brooks	Reynolds Coliseum (5,500); Raleigh, NC
December 29, 2024; 6:00 p.m., ACCN	No. 22	Clemson	W 83–79	10–3 (2–0)	19 – Hayes	9 – Hayes	5 – Brooks	Reynolds Coliseum (5,500); Raleigh, NC
January 5, 2025; 2:00 p.m., ACCNX/ESPN+	No. 22	Boston College	W 91–52	11–3 (3–0)	23 – Rivers	11 – Tied	5 – Brooks	Reynolds Coliseum (5,500); Raleigh, NC
January 9, 2025; 10:00 p.m., ACCNX/ESPN+	No. 21	at No. 24 California	L 71–78	11–4 (3–1)	21 – James	10 – Trygger	9 – Brooks	Haas Pavilion (1,874); Berkeley, CA
January 12, 2025; 3:00 p.m., ESPN	No. 21	at Stanford	W 81–67	12–4 (4–1)	17 – Rivers	11 – Rivers	4 – Brooks	Maples Pavilion (3,735); Stanford, CA
January 16, 2025; 7:00 p.m., ACCNX/ESPN+	No. 21	Pittsburgh	W 83–67	13–4 (5–1)	22 – James	10 – Hayes	7 – Rivers	Reynolds Coliseum (5,500); Raleigh, NC
January 19, 2025; 2:00 p.m., The CW	No. 21	Virginia	W 73–68	14–4 (6–1)	20 – James	13 – Trygger	7 – Brooks	Reynolds Coliseum (5,500); Raleigh, NC
January 23, 2025; 6:00 p.m., ACCN	No. 20	at Syracuse	W 74–66	15–4 (7–1)	19 – Brooks	9 – Hayes	6 – Tied	JMA Wireless Dome (2,445); Syracuse, NY
January 26, 2025; 6:00 p.m., ACCNX/ESPN+	No. 20	Virginia Tech	W 85–57	16–4 (8–1)	25 – James	8 – Brooks	4 – James	Reynolds Coliseum (5,500); Raleigh, NC
January 30, 2025; 6:00 p.m., ACCNX/ESPN+	No. 17	at Wake Forest	W 90–83	17–4 (9–1)	18 – Brooks	7 – Hayes	5 – Brooks	LJVM Coliseum (1,785); Winston-Salem, NC
February 3, 2025; 7:00 p.m., ESPN2	No. 14	No. 10 Duke	W 89–83	18–4 (10–1)	36 – James	7 – Tied	4 – Rivers	Reynolds Coliseum (5,500); Raleigh, NC
February 9, 2025; 2:00 p.m., The CW	No. 14	at No. 22 Florida State	W 97–74	19–4 (11–1)	22 – James	14 – Trygger	7 – Brooks	Donald L. Tucker Center (2,458); Tallahassee, FL
February 13, 2025; 6:00 p.m., ACCN	No. 10	Miami (FL)	W 76–74	20–4 (12–1)	19 – Hayes	7 – Hayes	5 – Rivers	Reynolds Coliseum (5,500); Raleigh, NC
February 16, 2025; 2:00 p.m., ESPN	No. 10	at No. 12 North Carolina; Rivalry	L 65–66	20–5 (12–2)	16 – James	12 – Rivers	4 – Tied	Carmichael Arena (6,319); Chapel Hill, NC
February 20, 2025; 7:00 p.m., ACCNX/ESPN+	No. 13	at No. 20 Georgia Tech	W 83–68	21–5 (13–2)	17 – Tied	7 – Tied	8 – Rivers	McCamish Pavilion (2,858); Atlanta, GA
February 23, 2025; 12:00 p.m., ESPN	No. 13	No. 1 Notre Dame; College GameDay	W 104–95 ^{2OT}	22–5 (14–2)	33 – Brooks	13 – Rivers	9 – Rivers	Reynolds Coliseum (5,500); Raleigh, NC
February 27, 2025; 7:00 p.m., ACCNX/ESPN+	No. 9	Wake Forest	W 78–57	23–5 (15–2)	21 – James	9 – Hayes	4 – Tied	Reynolds Coliseum (5,500); Raleigh, NC
March 2, 2025; 12:00 p.m., ACCN	No. 9	at SMU	W 69–45	24–5 (16–2)	19 – Tied	13 – Rivers	11 – Rivers	Moody Coliseum (1,193); University Park, TX
ACC tournament
March 7, 2025*; 1:30 p.m., ACCN	(1) No. 7	vs. (9) Georgia Tech; Quarterfinals	W 73–72	25–5	16 – James	9 – Brooks	4 – Brooks	Greensboro Coliseum (16,416); Greensboro, NC
March 8, 2025*; 12:00 p.m., ESPN2	(1) No. 7	vs. (5) No. 14 North Carolina; Semifinals	W 66–55	26–5	19 – James	9 – James	2 – Tied	Greensboro Coliseum (10,894); Greensboro, NC
March 9, 2025*; 1:00 p.m., ESPN	(1) No. 7	vs. (3) No. 11 Duke; Final	L 62–76	26–6	18 – James	7 – Trygger	4 – Rivers	Greensboro Coliseum (11,823); Greensboro, NC
NCAA tournament
March 22, 2025*; 2:00 p.m., ESPN	(2 S1) No. 9	(15 S1) Vermont; First Round	W 75–55	27–6	19 – Brooks	12 – Tied	3 – James	Reynolds Coliseum (5,500); Raleigh, NC
March 24, 2025*; 12:00 p.m., ESPN	(2 S1) No. 9	(7 S1) Michigan State; Second Round	W 83–49	28–6	26 – James	9 – Hayes	11 – Rivers	Reynolds Coliseum (4,694); Raleigh, NC
March 28, 2025*; 7:30 p.m., ESPN	(2 S1) No. 9	vs. (3 S1) No. 10 LSU; Sweet Sixteen	L 73–80	28–7	21 – Brooks	7 – Cox	5 – Tied	Spokane Arena (6,396); Spokane, WA
*Non-conference game. ^{#}Rankings from AP Poll. (#) Tournament seedings in parentheses. S1=Spokane 1. All times are in Eastern.

== Rankings ==
Ranking movements Legend: ██ Increase in ranking ██ Decrease in ranking RV = Received votes т = Tied with team above or below
	Week																				
Poll	Pre	1	2	3	4	5	6	7	8	9	10	11	12	13	14	15	16	17	18	19	Final
AP	9	13	20	20	RV	22т	21	22	22	21	21	20	17	14	10	13	9	7	9	9	9
Coaches	8	10	18	17	24	20	19	20	19	19т	21	20	16	14	11	12	10	8	9	9	10
