= 2024–25 LSU Tigers women's basketball team =

Intercollegiate basketball season

2024–25 LSU Tigers women's basketball

Baha Mar Hoops Pink Flamingo champions

NCAA tournament, Elite Eight
- Conference: Southeastern Conference

Ranking
- Coaches: No. 10
- AP: No. 10
- Record: 31–6 (12–4 SEC)
- Head coach: Kim Mulkey (4th season)
- Assistant coaches: Bob Starkey; Daphne Mitchell; Gary Redus II; Kaylin Rice; Joe Schwartz
- Home arena: Pete Maravich Assembly Center

2024–25 SEC women's basketball standings
	Conf.				Overall
Team	W		L	PCT	W		L	PCT
No. 2 South Carolina †	15	–	1	.938	35	–	4	.897
No. 5 Texas	15	–	1	.938	35	–	4	.897
No. 10 LSU	12	–	4	.750	31	–	6	.838
No. 13 Kentucky	11	–	5	.688	23	–	8	.742
No. 11 Oklahoma	11	–	5	.688	27	–	8	.771
No. 21 Alabama	10	–	6	.625	24	–	9	.727
No. 25 Ole Miss	10	–	6	.625	22	–	11	.667
Vanderbilt	8	–	8	.500	22	–	11	.667
No. 20 Tennessee	8	–	8	.500	24	–	10	.706
Mississippi State	7	–	9	.438	22	–	12	.647
Florida	5	–	11	.313	19	–	18	.514
Georgia	4	–	12	.250	13	–	19	.406
Arkansas	3	–	13	.188	10	–	22	.313
Auburn	3	–	13	.188	12	–	18	.400
Missouri	3	–	13	.188	14	–	18	.438
Texas A&M	3	–	13	.188	10	–	19	.345
† 2025 SEC tournament winner Rankings from AP poll

The 2024–25 LSU Tigers women's basketball team represented Louisiana State University during the 2024–25 NCAA Division I women's basketball season. The Tigers were led by fourth-year head coach Kim Mulkey, and played their home games at Pete Maravich Assembly Center and compete as a member of the Southeastern Conference (SEC).

== Previous season ==
The Tigers finished the season 31–6 (13–3 SEC) to finish in second place. The Tigers advanced to the 2024 SEC women's basketball tournament championship game but lost to eventual National Champions No. 1 South Carolina. They received an at-large bid to the NCAA Tournament as the No. 3 seed in the Albany 2 region. They defeated (14 A2) Rice in the first round, (11 A2) Middle Tennessee in the Second round, (2 A2) No. 6 UCLA in the Sweet Sixteen, and lost in the Elite Eight to (1 A2) No. 2 Iowa.

== Offseason ==
=== Departures ===
LSU Departures
Name	Number	Pos.	Height	Year	Hometown	Notes	Ref
Angelica Velez	1	G	5'7"	Freshman	The Bronx, NY	Transferred to Syracuse	
Angel Reese	10	F	6'3"	Junior	Baltimore, MD	2024 WNBA draft; Selected 7th overall by the Chicago Sky	
Hailey Van Lith	11	G	5'7"	Graduate Student	Wenatchee, WA	Transferred to TCU	

=== 2024 recruiting class ===
College recruiting information
Name	Hometown	School	Height	Weight	Commit date
Jada Richard; G	Lafayette, LA	Lafayette Christian Academy	5 ft 6 in (1.68 m)	N/A	
Jada Richard; G	Recruit ratings: ESPN: (92)				
Overall recruit ranking:
Note: In many cases, Scout, Rivals, 247Sports, On3, and ESPN may conflict in their listings of height and weight.; In these cases, the average was taken. ESPN grades are on a 100-point scale.; Sources:

=== Incoming transfers ===
LSU incoming transfers
Name	Number	Pos.	Height	Year	Hometown	Previous school	Ref
Mjracle Shepparrd	1	G	5'10"	Sophomore	Kent, WA	Mississippi State	
Jersey Wolfenbarger	8	G/F	6'5"	Junior	Fort Smith, AR	Arkansas	
Kailyn Gilbert	16	G	5'8"	Junior	Tampa Bay, FL	Arizona	
Shayeann Day-Wilson	50	G	5'6"	Junior	Toronto, ON	Miami (FL)	

== Roster ==
2024–25 LSU Tigers women's basketball team
Players
Coaches

Pos.	#	Name	Height	Year	Previous school	Hometown
G	1	Mjracle Sheppard	5 ft 10 in (1.78 m)	So	Montverde Academy; Mississippi State	Kent, WA (United States) (Washington (state))
F	2	Amani Bartlett	6 ft 3 in (1.91 m)	Sr	Houston Christian HS	Cleveland, TX (United States) (Texas)
G	4	Flau'jae Johnson	5 ft 10 in (1.78 m)	Jr	Sprayberry HS	Savannah, GA (United States) (Georgia (U.S. state))
F	5	Sa'Myah Smith	6 ft 2 in (1.88 m)	RS So	DeSoto HS	DeSoto, TX (United States) (Texas)
G/F	8	Jersey Wolfenbarger	6 ft 5 in (1.96 m)	Jr	Northside HS; Arkansas	Fort Smith, AR (United States) (Arkansas)
G	12	Mikaylah Williams	6 ft 0 in (1.83 m)	So	Parkway HS	Bossier City, LA (United States) (Louisiana)
G	13	Last-Tear Poa	5 ft 11 in (1.8 m)	Sr	UC Senior Secondary College Lake Ginninderra; Northwest Florida State College	Melbourne, Australia (Victoria (state))
G	14	Izzy Besselman	5 ft 10 in (1.78 m)	Jr	Episcopal School	Baton Rouge, LA (United States) (Louisiana)
G	16	Kailyn Gilbert	5 ft 8 in (1.73 m)	Jr	IMG Academy; Arizona	Tampa Bay, FL (United States) (Florida)
C	23	Aalyah Del Rosario	6 ft 6 in (1.98 m)	So	The Webb School	The Bronx, NY (United States) (New York (state))
G	24	Aneesah Morrow	6 ft 1 in (1.85 m)	Sr	Simeon Career Academy; DePaul	Chicago, IL (United States) (Illinois)
G	30	Jada Richard	5 ft 6 in (1.68 m)	Fr	Lafayette Christian Academy	Lafayette, LA (United States) (Louisiana)
G	50	Shayeann Day-Wilson	5 ft 6 in (1.68 m)	Sr	Royal Crown; Miami	Toronto, ON (Canada) (Ontario)

Head coach

- Kim Mulkey (Louisiana Tech)

Assistant coach(es)

- Bob Starkey
- Daphne Mitchell (Georgia Tech)
- Gary Redus II (South Alabama)
- Kaylin Rice (Baylor)
- Joe Schwartz (Texas)
- Seimone Augustus (LSU)

Legend

- (C) Team captain
- (S) Suspended
- (I) Ineligible
- (W) Walk-on
- Injured
- Current redshirt

Roster

== Schedule and results ==
Date time, TV	Rank^{#}	Opponent^{#}	Result	Record	High points	High rebounds	High assists	Site (attendance) city, state
Exhibition
October 24, 2024*; 7:00 p.m., SECN+/ESPN+	No. 7	Xavier New Orleans	W 114–53		30 – Johnson	10 – Tied	4 – Tied	Pete Maravich Assembly Center (1,964); Baton Rouge, LA
October 30, 2024*; 7:00 p.m., SECN+/ESPN+	No. 7	LSU–Alexandria	W 117–37		29 – Johnson	12 – Morrow	5 – Tied	Pete Maravich Assembly Center (2,184); Baton Rouge, LA
Non-conference regular season
November 4, 2024*; 7:00 p.m., SECN+/ESPN+	No. 7	Eastern Kentucky	W 95–44	1–0	25 – Johnson	11 – Smith	3 – Tied	Pete Maravich Assembly Center (9,822); Baton Rouge, LA
November 8, 2024*; 7:00 p.m., SECN+/ESPN+	No. 7	Northwestern State	W 95–36	2–0	24 – Johnson	7 – Johnson	4 – Williams	Pete Maravich Assembly Center (10,226); Baton Rouge, LA
November 12, 2024*; 11:00 a.m., SECN+/ESPN+	No. 7	Charleston Southern	W 117–44	3–0	25 – Williams	20 – Morrow	9 – Gilbert	Pete Maravich Assembly Center (11,095); Baton Rouge, LA
November 15, 2024*; 7:00 p.m., SECN+/ESPN+	No. 7	Murray State	W 74–60	4–0	25 – Johnson	14 – Morrow	8 – Day-Wilson	Pete Maravich Assembly Center (10,181); Baton Rouge, LA
November 18, 2024*; 7:00 p.m., SECN+/ESPN+	No. 7	Troy	W 98–59	5–0	27 – Johnson	13 – Morrow	5 – Johnson	Pete Maravich Assembly Center (9,735); Baton Rouge, LA
November 20, 2024*; 7:00 p.m., SECN+/ESPN+	No. 7	Tulane	W 85–74	6–0	25 – Johnson	16 – Morrow	5 – Tied	Pete Maravich Assembly Center (10,005); Baton Rouge, LA
November 25, 2024*; 12:30 p.m., FloHoops	No. 7	vs. Washington; Pink Flamingo Championship semifinals	W 68–67	7–0	19 – Tied	15 – Smith	7 – Day-Wilson	Baha Mar Convention Center (297); Nassau, Bahamas
November 27, 2024*; 12:30 p.m., FloHoops	No. 7	vs. No. 20 NC State; Pink Flamingo Championship finals	W 82–65	8–0	24 – Williams	15 – Morrow	9 – Day-Wilson	Baha Mar Convention Center (327); Nassau, Bahamas
December 1, 2024*; 2:00 p.m., SECN+/ESPN+	No. 7	North Carolina Central	W 131–44	9–0	22 – Johnson	11 – Morrow	4 – Day-Wilson	Pete Maravich Assembly Center (10,245); Baton Rouge, LA
December 5, 2024*; 8:00 p.m., ESPN2	No. 5	Stanford; ACC–SEC Challenge	W 94–88 ^{OT}	10–0	32 – Williams	16 – Morrow	6 – Johnson	Pete Maravich Assembly Center (10,317); Baton Rouge, LA
December 8, 2024*; 2:00 p.m.	No. 5	vs. Grambling State	W 100–54	11–0	26 – Morrow	16 – Morrow	5 – Williams	Brookshire Grocery Arena (8,299); Bossier City, LA
December 15, 2024*; 2:00 p.m., SECN+/ESPN+	No. 4	Louisiana	W 85–57	12–0	18 – Wolfenbarger	15 – Tied	4 – Poa	Pete Maravich Assembly Center (11,328); Baton Rouge, LA
December 17, 2024*; 5:00 p.m., FS1	No. 5	vs. Seton Hall; Basketball HOF Women's Showcase	W 91–64	13–0	24 – Morrow	19 – Morrow	5 – Williams	Mohegan Sun Arena (7,650); Uncasville, CT
December 19, 2024*; 7:00 p.m., ESPN+	No. 5	at UIC	W 91–73	14–0	23 – Johnson	13 – Morrow	7 – Williams	Credit Union 1 Arena (4,322); Chicago, IL
December 29, 2024*; 1:00 p.m., SECN+/ESPN+	No. 6	Albany	W 83–61	15–0	20 – Morrow	18 – Morrow	2 – Tied	Pete Maravich Assembly Center (12,171); Baton Rouge, LA
SEC regular season
January 2, 2025; 8:00 p.m., SECN	No. 6	at Arkansas	W 98–64	16–0 (1–0)	16 – Gilbert	10 – Tied	8 – Day-Wilson	Bud Walton Arena (3,985); Fayetteville, AR
January 5, 2025; 3:00 p.m., SECN	No. 6	Auburn	W 73–63	17–0 (2–0)	21 – Morrow	14 – Morrow	4 – Williams	Pete Maravich Assembly Center (11,302); Baton Rouge, LA
January 9, 2025; 5:30 p.m., SECN+/ESPN+	No. 6	at No. 16 Tennessee	W 89–87	18–0 (3–0)	23 – Morrow	21 – Morrow	3 – Tied	Thompson–Boling Arena (10,220); Knoxville, TN
January 13, 2025; 6:00 p.m., SECN	No. 5	Vanderbilt	W 83–77	19–0 (4–0)	25 – Johnson	15 – Morrow	5 – Williams	Pete Maravich Assembly Center (10,201); Baton Rouge, LA
January 19, 2025; 12:00 p.m., SECN	No. 5	at Florida	W 80–63	20–0 (5–0)	22 – Williams	10 – Morrow	2 – Tied	Stephen C. O'Connell Center (6,568); Gainesville, FL
January 24, 2025; 4:00 p.m., ESPN	No. 5	at No. 2 South Carolina	L 56–66	20–1 (5–1)	15 – Morrow	16 – Morrow	5 – Day-Wilson	Colonial Life Arena (18,000); Columbia, SC
January 26, 2025; 3:00 p.m., SECN	No. 5	Texas A&M	W 64–51	21–1 (6–1)	22 – Johnson	9 – Morrow	2 – Tied	Pete Maravich Assembly Center (11,061); Baton Rouge, LA
January 30, 2025; 6:00 p.m., ESPN2	No. 7	No. 13 Oklahoma	W 107–100	22–1 (7–1)	37 – Williams	12 – Morrow	9 – Day-Wilson	Pete Maravich Assembly Center (10,637); Baton Rouge, LA
February 2, 2025; 1:00 p.m., SECN	No. 7	Mississippi State	W 81–67	23–1 (8–1)	22 – Williams	20 – Morrow	4 – Tied	Pete Maravich Assembly Center (11,275); Baton Rouge, LA
February 6, 2025; 6:30 p.m., SECN+/ESPN+	No. 6	at Missouri	W 71–60	24–1 (9–1)	19 – Johnson	14 – Morrow	5 – Williams	Mizzou Arena (3,943); Columbia, MO
February 9, 2025; 3:00 p.m., ESPN	No. 6	No. 19 Tennessee	W 82–77	25–1 (10–1)	23 – Gilbert	14 – Morrow	7 – Williams	Pete Maravich Assembly Center (11,154); Baton Rouge, LA
February 16, 2025; 2:00 p.m., ABC	No. 5	at No. 3 Texas	L 58–65	25–2 (10–2)	18 – Williams	20 – Morrow	3 – Poa	Moody Center (10,542); Austin, TX
February 20, 2025; 8:00 p.m., SECN	No. 7	Georgia	W 79–63	26–2 (11–2)	21 – Johnson	12 – Tied	5 – Williams	Pete Maravich Assembly Center (10,229); Baton Rouge, LA
February 23, 2025; 3:00 p.m., ESPN	No. 7	at No. 14 Kentucky	W 65–58	27–2 (12–2)	24 – Williams	13 – Johnson	3 – Tied	Memorial Coliseum (6,000); Lexington, KY
February 27, 2025; 8:00 p.m., SECN	No. 7	at No. 20 Alabama	L 85–88 ^{OT}	27–3 (12–3)	22 – Williams	9 – Morrow	4 – Tied	Coleman Coliseum (3,318); Tuscaloosa, AL
March 2, 2025; 3:00 p.m., SECN	No. 7	Ole Miss	L 77–85	27–4 (12–4)	28 – Morrow	12 – Morrow	5 – Williams	Pete Maravich Assembly Center (11,543); Baton Rouge, LA
SEC Tournament
March 7, 2025; 7:30 p.m., SECN	(3) No. 9	vs. (11) Florida; Quarterfinals	W 101–87	28–4	36 – Morrow	14 – Morrow	8 – Williams	Bon Secours Wellness Arena (8,439); Greenville, SC
March 8, 2025; 7:00 p.m., ESPN2	(3) No. 9	vs. (2) No. 1 Texas; Semifinals	L 49–56	28–5	11 – Williams	7 – Smith	4 – Williams	Bon Secours Wellness Arena (13,275); Greenville, SC
NCAA Tournament
March 22, 2025*; 9:15 p.m., ESPN	(3 S1) No. 10	(14 S1) San Diego State; First Round	W 103–48	29–5	22 – Johnson	12 – Morrow	4 – Tied	Pete Maravich Assembly Center (9,288); Baton Rouge, LA
March 24, 2025*; 5:00 p.m., ESPN	(3 S1) No. 10	(6 S1) No. 22 Florida State; Second Round	W 101–71	30–5	28 – Williams	12 – Smith	7 – Morrow	Pete Maravich Assembly Center (10,329); Baton Rouge, LA
March 28, 2025*; 6:30 p.m., ESPN	(3 S1) No. 10	vs. (2 S1) No. 9 NC State; Sweet Sixteen	W 80–73	31–5	30 – Morrow	10 – Morrow	6 – Williams	Spokane Arena (6,396); Spokane, WA
March 30, 2025*; 2:00 p.m., ABC	(3 S1) No. 10	vs. (1 S1) No. 1 UCLA; Elite Eight	L 65–72	31–6	28 – Johnson	10 – Smith	4 – Johnson	Spokane Arena (9,299); Spokane, WA
*Non-conference game. ^{#}Rankings from AP Poll. (#) Tournament seedings in parentheses. S1=Spokane 1. All times are in Central Time.

== Rankings ==
Ranking movements Legend: ██ Increase in ranking ██ Decrease in ranking
	Week																				
Poll	Pre	1	2	3	4	5	6	7	8	9	10	11	12	13	14	15	16	17	18	19	Final
AP	7	7	7	7	5	4	5	6	6	6	5	5	7	6	5	7	7	9	10	10	
Coaches	7	7	7	7	5	4	3	3	4	4	4	4	5	4	5	7	7	9	10	10	

== See also ==
- 2024–25 LSU Tigers men's basketball team
