= 2024–25 Ole Miss Rebels women's basketball team =

Intercollegiate basketball season

2024–25 Ole Miss Rebels women's basketball

NCAA tournament, Sweet Sixteen
- Conference: Southeastern Conference

Ranking
- Coaches: No. 25
- AP: No. 25
- Record: 22–11 (10–6 SEC)
- Head coach: Yolett McPhee-McCuin (7th season)
- Assistant coaches: Empress Davenport; Kayla Gordon; Quentin Hillsman; Joy Smith; Jacob Whitehead
- Home arena: SJB Pavilion

2024–25 SEC women's basketball standings
	Conf.				Overall
Team	W		L	PCT	W		L	PCT
No. 2 South Carolina †	15	–	1	.938	35	–	4	.897
No. 5 Texas	15	–	1	.938	35	–	4	.897
No. 10 LSU	12	–	4	.750	31	–	6	.838
No. 13 Kentucky	11	–	5	.688	23	–	8	.742
No. 11 Oklahoma	11	–	5	.688	27	–	8	.771
No. 21 Alabama	10	–	6	.625	24	–	9	.727
No. 25 Ole Miss	10	–	6	.625	22	–	11	.667
Vanderbilt	8	–	8	.500	22	–	11	.667
No. 20 Tennessee	8	–	8	.500	24	–	10	.706
Mississippi State	7	–	9	.438	22	–	12	.647
Florida	5	–	11	.313	19	–	18	.514
Georgia	4	–	12	.250	13	–	19	.406
Arkansas	3	–	13	.188	10	–	22	.313
Auburn	3	–	13	.188	12	–	18	.400
Missouri	3	–	13	.188	14	–	18	.438
Texas A&M	3	–	13	.188	10	–	19	.345
† 2025 SEC tournament winner Rankings from AP poll

The 2024–25 Ole Miss Rebels women's basketball team represented the University of Mississippi during the 2024–25 NCAA Division I women's basketball season. The Rebels, led by seventh-year head coach Yolett McPhee-McCuin, played their home games at The Sandy and John Black Pavilion at Ole Miss and competed as members of the Southeastern Conference (SEC).

== Previous season ==
The Rebels finished the season 24–9 (12–4 SEC) and received an at-large bid to the NCAA tournament, where they defeated Marquette before falling to Notre Dame.

== Offseason ==
=== Departures ===
Ole Miss departures
Name	Number	Pos.	Height	Year	Hometown	Notes	Ref
Marquesha Davis	2	G	6'0"	Senior	McGehee, AR	Drafted eleventh overall by the New York Liberty	
Snudda Collins	5	F	6'1"	Senior	Brookhaven, MS	Graduated	
Marija Avlijas	12	G	5'11"	Freshman	Belgrade, Serbia	Transferred to Columbia	
Zakiya Stephenson	21	G	5'4"	Freshman	Virginia Beach, VA	Transferred to James Madison	
Tyia Singleton	22	F	6'2"	Senior	Winter Haven, FL	Graduated	
Elauna Eaton	23	G	6'0"	Junior	Helena, AR	Transferred to Memphis	
Rita Igbokwe	32	C	6'4"	Senior	Jonesboro, GA	Graduated	

=== 2024 recruiting class ===
College recruiting information
Name	Hometown	School	Height	Weight	Commit date
Heloisa Carrera; F	São Paulo, Brazil	IMG Academy	6 ft 4 in (1.93 m)	N/A	
Heloisa Carrera; F	Recruit ratings: No ratings found				
Fatumata Djaló; F	Aveiro, Portugal	Dr. Jaime Magalhães Lima	5 ft 10 in (1.78 m)	N/A	
Fatumata Djaló; F	Recruit ratings: No ratings found				
Jite Gbemuotor; F	Delta State, Nigeria	ŽKK Celje	6 ft 2 in (1.88 m)	N/A	
Jite Gbemuotor; F	Recruit ratings: No ratings found				
Sira Thienou; F	Bamako, Mali	Shining Stars Sports Academy	6 ft 2 in (1.88 m)	N/A	
Sira Thienou; F	Recruit ratings: No ratings found				
Overall recruit ranking:
Note: In many cases, Scout, Rivals, 247Sports, On3, and ESPN may conflict in their listings of height and weight.; In these cases, the average was taken. ESPN grades are on a 100-point scale.; Sources:

=== Incoming transfers ===
Ole Miss incoming transfers
Name	Number	Pos.	Height	Year	Hometown	Previous school
Tameiya Sadler	2	G	5'8"	Senior	Vallejo, California	Colorado
Starr Jacobs	7	F	6'2"	Senior	Dallas, Texas	Arkansas–Pine Bluff
Christeen Iwuala	12	F	6'2"	Junior	San Antonio, Texas	UCLA

== Roster ==
2024–25 Ole Miss Rebels women's basketball team
Players
Coaches

Pos.	#	Name	Height	Year	Previous school	Hometown
F	0	Sira Thienou	6 ft 2 in (1.88 m)	Fr	Shining Stars Sports Academy	Bamako, Mali
G	1	KK Deans	5 ft 8 in (1.73 m)	GS	Connections Academy; Florida	Greensboro, NC
G	2	Tameiya Sadler	5 ft 8 in (1.73 m)	Sr	St. Patrick-St. Vincent HS; Colorado	Vallejo, CA
G	3	Kennedy Todd-Williams	6 ft 0 in (1.83 m)	Sr	Jacksonville HS; North Carolina	Jacksonville, NC
F	7	Starr Jacobs	6 ft 2 in (1.88 m)	Sr	Duncanville HS; Arkansas–Pine Bluff	Dallas, TX
F	9	Jite Gbemuotor	6 ft 2 in (1.88 m)	Fr	ŽKK Celje	Delta State, Nigeria
C	10	J'Adore Young	6 ft 4 in (1.93 m)	So	Greenville HS	Mauldin, SC
G	11	Fatumata Djaló	5 ft 10 in (1.78 m)	Fr	Dr. Jaime Magalhães Lima	Aveiro, Portugal
F	12	Christeen Iwuala	6 ft 2 in (1.88 m)	Jr	Ronald Reagan HS; UCLA	San Antonio, TX
G	13	Mariyah Noel	5 ft 11 in (1.8 m)	So	Bonner Springs HS	Kansas City, KS
F	14	Heloisa Carrera	6 ft 4 in (1.93 m)	Fr	IMG Academy	São Paulo, Brazil
G	20	Ayanna Thompson	6 ft 1 in (1.85 m)	Jr	DeSoto HS	DeSoto, TX
F	24	Madison Scott	6 ft 1 in (1.85 m)	GS	Bishop McNamara HS	Indian Head, MD
F	33	Kharyssa Richardson	6 ft 2 in (1.88 m)	Jr	New Manchester HS; Auburn	Douglasville, GA
F	35	Rhema Collins	6 ft 2 in (1.88 m)	So	The Webb School	Nassau, Bahamas

Head coach

- Yolett McPhee-McCuin (Rhode Island)

Assistant coach(es)

- Empress Davenport (Texas)
- Kayla Gordon (Jacksonville)
- Quentin Hillsman (St. Mary's (MD))
- Joy Smith (Duke)
- Jacob Whitehead (SIU Edwardsville)

Legend

- (C) Team captain
- (S) Suspended
- (I) Ineligible
- (W) Walk-on
- Injured
- Current redshirt

Roster
Last update: July 24, 2024

== Schedule and results ==
Date time, TV	Rank^{#}	Opponent^{#}	Result	Record	High points	High rebounds	High assists	Site (attendance) city, state
Exhibition
October 28, 2024*; 6:30 pm	No. 20	Christian Brothers	W 114–29		–	–	–	SJB Pavilion; Oxford, MS
Non-conference regular season
November 4, 2024*; 11:00 am, ESPN	No. 20	vs. No. 3 USC; Aflac Oui-Play	L 66–68	0–1	19 – Deans	9 – Tied	5 – Scott	Adidas Arena; Paris, France
November 10, 2024*; 2:00 pm, SECN+/ESPN+	No. 20	Arkansas–Pine Bluff	W 85–24	1–1	16 – Deans	11 – Richardson	4 – Scott	SJB Pavilion (2,879); Oxford, MS
November 14, 2024*; 4:30 pm, ESPN+	No. 19	at Delaware State	W 80–42	2–1	18 – Jacobs	9 – Todd-Williams	7 – Deans	Memorial Hall (300); Dover, DE
November 18, 2024*; 11:00 am, SECN+/ESPN+	No. 17	Jackson State	W 76–44	3–1	16 – Thienou	6 – Tied	5 – Scott	SJB Pavilion (8,653); Oxford, MS
November 25, 2024*; 4:00 pm, FloHoops	No. 18	vs. Boston College; Baha Mar Championship semifinals	W 92–55	4–1	17 – Todd-Williams	11 – Jacobs	5 – Todd-Williams	Baha Mar Convention Center (567); Nassau, Bahamas
November 27, 2024*; 6:30 pm, FloHoops	No. 18	vs. No. 2 UConn; Baha Mar Championship game	L 60–73	4–2	17 – Deans	7 – Scott	6 – Scott	Baha Mar Convention Center (1,507); Nassau, Bahamas
November 30, 2024*; 2:00 pm, SECN+/ESPN+	No. 18	Alabama State	W 89–24	5–2	16 – Thienou	8 – Jacobs	5 – Tied	SJB Pavilion (2,770); Oxford, MS
December 5, 2024*; 6:00 pm, ESPN2	No. 18	at NC State; ACC–SEC Challenge	L 61–68	5–3	15 – Scott	9 – Jacobs	3 – Deans	Reynolds Coliseum (5,500); Raleigh, NC
December 8, 2024*; 1:00 pm, SECN+/ESPN+	No. 18	Tennessee State	W 85–38	6–3	16 – Scott	9 – Scott	5 – Deans	SJB Pavilion (2,625); Oxford, MS
December 15, 2024*; 2:00 pm, SECN+/ESPN+	No. 22т	South Alabama	W 94–39	7–3	23 – Thienou	7 – Jacobs	8 – Sadler	SJB Pavilion (2,602); Oxford, MS
December 21, 2024*; 12:00 pm, SECN+/ESPN+	No. 25	Mississippi Valley State	W 78–44	8–3	18 – Thienou	10 – Scott	6 – Scott	SJB Pavilion (2,356); Oxford, MS
December 30, 2024*; 6:30 pm, SECN+/ESPN+	No. 25	Alcorn State	W 93–41	9–3	14 – Jacobs	7 – Tied	7 – Scott	SJB Pavilion (2,896); Oxford, MS
SEC regular season
January 2, 2025; 6:00 pm, SECN+/ESPN+	No. 25	at Auburn	W 85–58	10–3 (1–0)	20 – Deans	9 – Jacobs	4 – Tied	Neville Arena (2,955); Auburn, AL
January 5, 2025; 2:00 pm, SECN+/ESPN+	No. 25	at Texas A&M	L 58–60	10–4 (1–1)	14 – Scott	6 – Sadler	2 – Tied	Reed Arena (3,729); College Station, TX
January 9, 2025; 6:30 pm, SECN+/ESPN+		Vanderbilt	W 87–59	11–4 (2–1)	25 – Todd-Williams	6 – Todd-Williams	7 – Tied	SJB Pavilion (3,825); Oxford, MS
January 12, 2025; 3:00 pm, SECN+/ESPN+		No. 18 Alabama	L 78–84	11–5 (2–2)	21 – Jacobs	12 – Jacobs	5 – Scott	SJB Pavilion (7,844); Oxford, MS
January 16, 2025; 8:00 pm, SECN		Florida	W 94–69	12–5 (3–2)	29 – Thienou	6 – Tied	6 – Todd-Williams	SJB Pavilion (2,884); Oxford, MS
January 19, 2025; 2:00 pm, SECN		at Mississippi State	W 71–63	13–5 (4–2)	30 – Scott	8 – Jacobs	4 – Tied	Humphrey Coliseum (6,925); Starkville, MS
January 26, 2025; 2:00 pm, ESPN		No. 7 Texas	L 58–61	13–6 (4–3)	17 – Scott	7 – Jacobs	3 – Tied	SJB Pavilion (4,073); Oxford, MS
January 30, 2025; 5:00 pm, SECN+/ESPN+		at Georgia	W 63–58	14–6 (5–3)	19 – Scott	8 – Tied	5 – Scott	Stegeman Coliseum (2,262); Athens, GA
February 2, 2025; 2:00 pm, SECN+/ESPN+		at No. 23 Vanderbilt	W 76–61	15–6 (6–3)	24 – Jacobs	10 – Jacobs	3 – Tied	Memorial Gymnasium (6,021); Nashville, TN
February 6, 2025; 6:30 pm, SECN+/ESPN+		No. 15 Oklahoma	L 56–66	15–7 (6–4)	15 – Jacobs	9 – Iwuala	4 – Sadler	SJB Pavilion (2,720); Oxford, MS
February 10, 2025; 6:00 pm, ESPN2		No. 8 Kentucky	W 66–57	16–7 (7–4)	22 – Scott	9 – Tied	4 – Todd-Williams	SJB Pavilion (2,875); Oxford, MS
February 13, 2025; 6:30 pm, SECN+/ESPN+		at Arkansas	W 89–50	17–7 (8–4)	17 – Sadler	11 – Scott	5 – Tied	Bud Walton Arena (2,625); Fayetteville, AR
February 16, 2025; 11:00 am, SECN		at No. 15 Tennessee	L 71–80	17–8 (8–5)	22 – Deans	10 – Jacobs	7 – Scott	Thompson–Boling Arena (12,402); Knoxville, TN
February 23, 2025; 2:00 pm, SECN		Missouri	W 68–66	18–8 (9–5)	22 – Jacobs	7 – Iwuala	5 – Sadler	SJB Pavilion (2,960); Oxford, MS
February 27, 2025; 8:00 pm, ESPN		No. 6 South Carolina	L 59–75	18–9 (9–6)	15 – Thienou	9 – Iwuala	6 – Deans	SJB Pavilion (5,064); Oxford, MS
March 2, 2025; 3:00 pm, SECN		at No. 7 LSU	W 85–77	19–9 (10–6)	19 – Sadler	9 – Tied	4 – Scott	Pete Maravich Assembly Center (11,543); Baton Rouge, LA
SEC tournament
March 6, 2025; 5:00 pm, SECN	(7)	vs. (10) Mississippi State; Second Round	W 85–73	20–9	20 – Tied	7 – Tied	5 – Sadler	Bon Secours Wellness Arena; Greenville, SC
March 7, 2025; 5:00 pm, SECN	(7)	vs. (2) No. 1 Texas; Quarterfinals	L 63–70	20–10	20 – Deans	9 – Scott	7 – Scott	Bon Secours Wellness Arena; Greenville, SC
NCAA tournament
March 21, 2025*; 5:00 pm, ESPNU	(5 S1) No. 25	vs. (12 S1) Ball State; First round	W 83–65	21–10	18 – Jacobs	11 – Tied	4 – Sadler	Foster Pavilion; Waco, TX
March 23, 2025*; 3:00 pm, ESPN	(5 S1) No. 25	at (4 S1) No. 14 Baylor; Second round	W 69–63	22–10	16 – Thienou	7 – Iwuala	4 – Sadler	Foster Pavilion; Waco, TX
March 28, 2025*; 9:00 pm, ESPN	(5 S1) No. 25	vs. (1 S1) No. 1 UCLA; Sweet Sixteen	L 62–76	22–11	14 – Sadler	9 – Tied	3 – Sadler	Spokane Arena (8,789); Spokane, WA
*Non-conference game. ^{#}Rankings from AP poll. (#) Tournament seedings in parentheses. S1=Spokane 1. All times are in Central.

== Rankings ==
Ranking movements Legend: ██ Increase in ranking ██ Decrease in ranking — = Not ranked RV = Received votes т = Tied with team above or below
	Week																				
Poll	Pre	1	2	3	4	5	6	7	8	9	10	11	12	13	14	15	16	17	18	19	Final
AP	20	19	17	18	18	22т	25	25	25	RV	RV	RV	RV	RV	RV	RV	RV	RV	25	25	
Coaches	21	21	20	18	18	23	RV	RV	25	RV	RV	RV	—	RV	RV	RV	RV	RV	25	25	

== See also ==
- 2024–25 Ole Miss Rebels men's basketball team
