= 2024–25 Texas Longhorns women's basketball team =

Intercollegiate basketball season

2024–25 Texas Longhorns women's basketball

Gulf Coast Showcase champions SEC regular season co-champions

NCAA tournament, Final Four
- Conference: Southeastern Conference

Ranking
- Coaches: No. 4
- AP: No. 5
- Record: 35–4 (15–1 SEC)
- Head coach: Vic Schaefer (5th season)
- Associate head coach: Elena Lovato (3rd season)
- Assistant coaches: Lindsay Wisdom-Hylton (3rd season); Blair Schaefer (5th season)
- Home arena: Moody Center

2024–25 SEC women's basketball standings
	Conf.				Overall
Team	W		L	PCT	W		L	PCT
No. 2 South Carolina †	15	–	1	.938	35	–	4	.897
No. 5 Texas	15	–	1	.938	35	–	4	.897
No. 10 LSU	12	–	4	.750	31	–	6	.838
No. 13 Kentucky	11	–	5	.688	23	–	8	.742
No. 11 Oklahoma	11	–	5	.688	27	–	8	.771
No. 21 Alabama	10	–	6	.625	24	–	9	.727
No. 25 Ole Miss	10	–	6	.625	22	–	11	.667
Vanderbilt	8	–	8	.500	22	–	11	.667
No. 20 Tennessee	8	–	8	.500	24	–	10	.706
Mississippi State	7	–	9	.438	22	–	12	.647
Florida	5	–	11	.313	19	–	18	.514
Georgia	4	–	12	.250	13	–	19	.406
Arkansas	3	–	13	.188	10	–	22	.313
Auburn	3	–	13	.188	12	–	18	.400
Missouri	3	–	13	.188	14	–	18	.438
Texas A&M	3	–	13	.188	10	–	19	.345
† 2025 SEC tournament winner Rankings from AP poll

The 2024–25 Texas Longhorns women's basketball team represented the University of Texas at Austin in the 2024–25 NCAA Division I women's basketball season. The team was coached by Vic Schaefer entering his fifth season at Texas. The Longhorns competed members of the Southeastern Conference, in their first year in the conference, and played their home games at the Moody Center.

== Previous season ==
=== Regular season ===
The Longhorns finished the 2023–24 season 33–5, 14–4 in Big 12 play. Texas won the Big 12 Conference Tournament and made it to the Elite Eight in the NCAA Tournament.

== Offseason ==
=== Returning players ===
Name	Number	Pos.	Height	Year	Hometown
Rori Harmon	3	G	5’6”	Senior	Houston, TX
Shay Holle	10	G	6’0”	Junior	Austin, TX
Aaliyah Moore	23	F	6’1”	Sophomore	Moore, OK

=== Departures ===
Name	Number	Pos.	Height	Year	Hometown	Reason for departure
Amina Muhammad	14	F	6'4"	Sophomore	DeSoto, TX	Transferred to Oregon
DeYona Gaston	5	F	6'2"	Senior	Pearland, TX	Transferred to Auburn
Tionna Herron	8	C	6'4"	Freshman	DeSoto, TX	Transferred to Missouri
Gisella Maul	21	G	5'11"	Freshman	Cedar Park, TX	Transferred to California
Khadija Faye	20	F	6'4"	Senior	Dakar, Senegal	Transferred to Pittsburgh
Shaylee Gonzales	2	G	5'10"	Graduate Student	Gilbert, AZ	Graduated

=== Acquisitions ===
==== Incoming transfers ====
Name	Pos.	Height	Year	Hometown	Previous team	Source
Kyla Oldacre	F	6'6"	Sophomore	Mason, OH	Miami	
Laila Phelia	G	6'0"	Senior	Cincinnati, OH	Michigan	

==== 2024 recruiting class ====
College recruiting information (2024)
Name	Hometown	School	Height	Weight	Commit date
Jordan Lee; G	Stockton, CA	St. Mary's	6 ft 0 in (1.83 m)	N/A	Sep 22, 2023
Jordan Lee; G	Recruit ratings: ESPN: (97)				
Justice Carlton; F	Katy, TX	Seven Lakes High School	6 ft 2 in (1.88 m)	N/A	Sep 22, 2023
Justice Carlton; F	Recruit ratings: ESPN: (97)				
Bryanna Preston; PG	Lovejoy, GA	Wesleyan School	5 ft 9 in (1.75 m)	N/A	Oct 13, 2023
Bryanna Preston; PG	Recruit ratings: ESPN: (95)				
Overall recruiting rankings:
Note: In many cases, Scout, Rivals, 247Sports, and ESPN may conflict in their listings of height and weight.; In these cases, the average was taken. ESPN grades are on a 100-point scale.; Sources: "2023 Player Commits". ESPN.com.

== Preseason ==
=== SEC Media Poll ===
SEC media poll
Predicted finish	Team
1	South Carolina
2	Texas
3	LSU
4	Oklahoma
5	Ole Miss
6	Alabama
7	Tennessee
8	Kentucky
9	Florida
10	Vanderbilt
11	Mississippi State
12	Auburn
13	Texas A&M
14	Georgia
15	Missouri
16	Arkansas

=== Preseason SEC awards ===
SEC Player of the Year
Player	No.	Position	Class
Madison Booker	35	F	Sophomore

=== Preseason All-SEC team ===
Position	Player	Class
First Team
F	Madison Booker	Sophomore
Second Team
G	Rori Harmon	Senior

== Roster ==
2024–25 Texas Longhorns women's basketball team
Players
Coaches

Pos.	#	Name	Height	Year	Previous school	Hometown
F	00	Kyla Oldacre	6 ft 6 in (1.98 m)	Sr	Miami	Mason, OH
G	1	Bryanna Preston	5 ft 9 in (1.75 m)	Fr	Wesleyan	Jonesboro, GA
PG	3	Rori Harmon	5 ft 6 in (1.68 m)	Sr	Cypress Creek	Houston, TX
G	5	Laila Phelia	6 ft 0 in (1.83 m)	Sr	Michigan	Cincinnati, OH
G	7	Jordan Lee	6 ft 0 in (1.83 m)	Fr	St. Mary's	Stockton, CA
G	10	Shay Holle	6 ft 0 in (1.83 m)	Sr	Westlake	Austin, TX
F	11	Justice Carlton	6 ft 1 in (1.85 m)	Fr	Seven Lakes	Katy, TX
G	13	Jordana Codio	6 ft 1 in (1.85 m)	Jr	Montverde Academy	Jupiter, FL
F	23	Aaliyah Moore	6 ft 1 in (1.85 m)	Sr	Moore	Moore, OK
G	25	Sarah Graves	5 ft 9 in (1.75 m)	Jr	Keller	Keller, TX
G	32	Ndjakalenga Mwenentanda	6 ft 2 in (1.88 m)	Jr	Washington	Sioux Falls, SD
F	35	Madison Booker	6 ft 1 in (1.85 m)	So	Germantown	Ridgeland, MS
F	44	Taylor Jones	6 ft 4 in (1.93 m)	Sr	Oregon State	Forney, TX
C	50	Abbie Boutilier	6 ft 9 in (2.06 m)	So	Flower Mound	Flower Mound, TX

Head coach

- Vic Schaefer (Texas A&M)

Assistant coach(es)

- Elena Lovato (Pittsburg State)
- Lindsay Wisdom-Hylton (Purdue)
- Blair Schaefer (Mississippi State)

Legend

- (C) Team captain
- (S) Suspended
- (I) Ineligible
- (W) Walk-on
- Injured
- Current redshirt

Roster

=== Support staff ===
2024-25 Texas Longhorns support staff
- Sydney Carter – Director of player development
- Zack Zillner – Sports Performance Coach
- Brennan Dumas – Graduate Assistant
- Mason Wright – Graduate Assistant
- Brett Haden – Graduate Assistant

== Schedule and results ==
Date time, TV	Rank^{#}	Opponent^{#}	Result	Record	High points	High rebounds	High assists	Site (attendance) city, state
Exhibition
October 31, 2024*; 7:00 p.m.	No. 4	UT-Tyler	W 98–25	–	14 – Jones	9 – Jones	4 – Preston	Moody Center; Austin, TX
Regular Season
November 10, 2024*; 2:00 p.m., SECN+/ESPN+	No. 4	Southeast Missouri State	W 119–47	1–0	21 – Oldacre	14 – Oldacre	7 – Harmon	Moody Center (6,878); Austin, TX
November 13, 2024*; 7:00 p.m., SECN+/ESPN+	No. 4	Lamar	W 95–58	2–0	15 – Tied	7 – Oldacre	8 – Harmon	Moody Center (6,243); Austin, TX
November 17, 2024*; 7:00 p.m., FS2	No. 4	at DePaul	W 91–61	3–0	22 – Jones	12 – Jones	9 – Harmon	Wintrust Arena (1,725); Chicago, IL
November 20, 2024*; 11:00 a.m., SECN+/ESPN+	No. 4	Tarleton State	W 83–41	4–0	25 – Booker	10 – Oldacre	3 – Booker	Moody Center (6,173); Austin, TX
November 29, 2024*; 6:30 p.m., FloSports	No. 5	vs. New Mexico State; Gulf Coast Showcase First Round	W 90–50	5–0	21 – Booker	6 – Jones	5 – Harmon	Hertz Arena (332); Estero, FL
November 30, 2024*; 6:30 p.m., FloSports	No. 5	vs. Butler; Gulf Coast Showcase semifinals	W 94–59	6–0	30 – Carlton	6 – Harmon	9 – Harmon	Hertz Arena (412); Estero, FL
December 1, 2024*; 6:30 p.m., FloSports	No. 5	vs. No. 12 West Virginia; Gulf Coast Showcase championship	W 78–73	7–0	20 – Moore	8 – Booker	6 – Harmon	Hertz Arena (457); Estero, FL
December 5, 2024*; 6:00 p.m., ESPN	No. 4	at No. 10 Notre Dame; ACC–SEC Challenge	L 70–80 ^{OT}	7–1	20 – Booker	8 – Tied	5 – Tied	Joyce Center (9,149); South Bend, IN
December 8, 2024*; 1:00 p.m., ESPN+	No. 4	at James Madison	W 93–62	8–1	21 – Booker	7 – Jones	5 – Harmon	Atlantic Union Bank Center (3,361); Harrisonburg, VA
December 11, 2024*; 7:00 p.m., SECN+/ESPN+	No. 6	Southern	W 97–39	9–1	19 – Jones	11 – Jones	9 – Harmon	Moody Center (6,460); Austin, TX
December 15, 2024*; 1:00 p.m., ESPN+	No. 6	at Richmond	W 65–54	10–1	25 – Booker	11 – Booker	7 – Harmon	Robins Center (2,714); Richmond, VA
December 17, 2024*; 7:00 p.m., SECN+/ESPN+	No. 6	La Salle	W 111–49	11–1	18 – Oldacre	11 – Jones	6 – Harmon	Moody Center (6,386); Austin, TX
December 22, 2024*; 2:00 p.m., SECN+/ESPN+	No. 6	South Dakota State	W 103–57	12–1	19 – Carlton	11 – Jones	7 – Harmon	Moody Center (7,020); Austin, TX
December 29, 2024*; 3:00 p.m., SECN	No. 5	UT Rio Grande Valley	W 94–35	13–1	21 – Oldacre	9 – Jones	7 – Booker	Moody Center (7,157); Austin, TX
January 2, 2025; 8:00 p.m., ESPN2	No. 5	at No. 9 Oklahoma	W 80–73	14–1 (1–0)	17 – Lee	7 – Oldacre	8 – Harmon	Lloyd Noble Center (8,039); Norman, OK
January 5, 2025; 2:00 p.m., SECN+/ESPN+	No. 5	Arkansas	W 90–56	15–1 (2–0)	17 – Moore	14 – Moore	6 – Harmon	Moody Center (8,113); Austin, TX
January 9, 2025; 7:00 p.m., SECN+/ESPN+	No. 5	No. 18 Alabama	W 84–40	16–1 (3–0)	21 – Booker	12 – Jones	6 – Harmon	Moody Center (6,680); Austin, TX
January 12, 2025; 12:00 p.m., ESPN	No. 5	at No. 2 South Carolina	L 50–67	16–2 (3–1)	11 – Oldacre	16 – Oldacre	2 – Harmon	Colonial Life Arena (18,000); Columbia, SC
January 16, 2025; 6:00 p.m., SECN+/ESPN+	No. 7	at Auburn	W 74–57	17–2 (4–1)	22 – Booker	7 – Jones	6 – Harmon	Neville Arena (3,151); Auburn, AL
January 20, 2025*; 4:30 p.m., FOX	No. 7	vs. No. 8 Maryland; Coretta Scott King Classic	W 89–51	18–2	28 – Booker	9 – Jones	7 – Harmon	Prudential Center (6,147); Newark, NJ
January 23, 2025; 8:00 p.m., SECN	No. 7	No. 17 Tennessee	W 80–76	19–2 (5–1)	26 – Booker	14 – Jones	8 – Harmon	Moody Center (7,530); Austin, TX
January 26, 2025; 2:00 p.m., ESPN	No. 7	at Ole Miss	W 61–58	20–2 (6–1)	24 – Jones	10 – Booker	7 – Harmon	SJB Pavilion (4,073); Oxford, MS
January 30, 2025; 8:00 p.m., SECN	No. 5	Missouri	W 70–61	21–2 (7–1)	17 – Jones	7 – Mwenentanda	10 – Harmon	Moody Center (6,831); Austin, TX
February 2, 2025; 5:00 p.m., SECN	No. 5	at Texas A&M; Lone Star Showdown	W 70–50	22–2 (8–1)	17 – Booker	13 – Booker	5 – Tied	Reed Arena (4,676); College Station, TX
February 6, 2025; 8:00 p.m., SECN	No. 4	No. 24 Vanderbilt	W 87–66	23–2 (9–1)	20 – Booker	6 – Tied	5 – Harmon	Moody Center (7,049); Austin, TX
February 9, 2025; 1:00 p.m., ESPN	No. 4	No. 2 South Carolina	W 66–62	24–2 (10–1)	20 – Booker	11 – Booker	4 – Harmon	Moody Center (10,517); Austin, TX
February 13, 2025; 6:00 p.m., ESPN2	No. 3	at No. 8 Kentucky	W 67–49	25–2 (11–1)	19 – Tied	8 – Tied	4 – Tied	Memorial Coliseum (5,424); Lexington, KY
February 16, 2025; 2:00 p.m., ABC	No. 3	No. 5 LSU	W 65–58	26–2 (12–1)	16 – Booker	10 – Booker	5 – Harmon	Moody Center (10,542); Austin, TX
February 24, 2025; 6:00 p.m., SECN	No. 1	at Georgia	W 57–26	27–2 (13–1)	17 – Jones	16 – Jones	3 – Tied	Stegeman Coliseum (2,747); Athens, GA
February 27, 2025; 6:30 p.m., SECN+/ESPN+	No. 1	at Mississippi State	W 68–64	28–2 (14–1)	16 – Holle	11 – Mwenentanda	7 – Harmon	Humphrey Coliseum (5,283); Starkville, MS
March 2, 2025; 1:00 p.m., SECN	No. 1	Florida	W 72–46	29–2 (15–1)	18 – Oldacre	7 – Harmon	9 – Harmon	Moody Center (10,580); Austin, TX
SEC Tournament
March 7, 2025; 5:00 p.m., SECN	(2) No. 1	vs. (7) Ole Miss; Quarterfinals	W 70–63	30–2	19 – Booker	7 – Booker	9 – Harmon	Bon Secours Wellness Arena; Greenville, SC
March 8, 2025; 7:00 p.m., ESPN2	(2) No. 1	vs. (3) No. 9 LSU; Semifinals	W 56–49	31–2	25 – Booker	8 – Carlton	2 – Tied	Bon Secours Wellness Arena (13,275); Greenville, SC
March 9, 2025; 2:00 p.m., ESPN	(2) No. 1	vs. (1) No. 5 South Carolina; Championship Game	L 45–64	31–3	14 – Tied	10 – Booker	3 – Harmon	Bon Secours Wellness Arena (13,532); Greenville, SC
NCAA Tournament
March 22, 2025*; 8:45 p.m., ESPN2	(1 B3) No. 5	(16 B3) William & Mary; First Round	W 105–61	32–3	20 – Booker	14 – Booker	8 – Harmon	Moody Center (10,013); Austin, TX
March 24, 2025*; 1:00 p.m., ESPN	(1 B3) No. 5	(8 B3) Illinois; Second Round	W 65–48	33–3	20 – Booker	7 – Oldacre	7 – Harmon	Moody Center (9,042); Austin, TX
March 29, 2025*; 2:30 p.m., ABC	(1 B3) No. 5	vs. (5 B3) No. 20 Tennessee; Sweet Sixteen	W 67–59	34–3	17 – Booker	8 – Jones	4 – Tied	Legacy Arena (11,433); Birmingham, AL
March 31, 2025*; 7:00 p.m., ESPN	(1 B3) No. 5	vs. (2 B3) No. 6 TCU; Elite Eight	W 58–47	35–3	18 – Booker	6 – Tied	5 – Harmon	Legacy Arena (12,175); Birmingham, AL
April 4, 2025*; 6:00 p.m., ESPN	(1 B3) No. 5	vs. (1 B2) No. 2 South Carolina; Final Four	L 57–74	35–4	16 – Lee	8 – Jones	4 – Harmon	Amalie Arena (19,731); Tampa, FL
*Non-conference game. ^{#}Rankings from AP Poll. (#) Tournament seedings in parentheses. B3=Birmingham 3. All times are in Central Time.

== Awards and honors ==
=== National awards and honors ===
National Weekly honors
Honors	Player	Position	Date Awarded	Ref.
USBWA National Freshman of the Week	Justice Carlton	F	December 3, 2024	
Naismith Trophy Player of the Week	Madison Booker	F	January 27, 2025	
AP Player of the Week	Madison Booker	F	February 11, 2025	
Cheryl Miller Award	Madison Booker	F	April 5, 2025	

=== SEC awards and honors ===
SEC Honors
Honors	Player	Position	Date Awarded	Ref.
SEC Player of the Year	Madison Booker	F	March 4, 2025	
SEC Coach of the Year	Vic Schaefer	HC	March 4, 2025	

All-SEC Team
Player	Position	Team
Madison Booker	F	1st team

SEC All-Defensive Team
Player	Position
Rori Harmon	G

SEC All-Freshman Team
Player	Position
Jordan Lee	G

SEC Weekly honors
Honors	Player	Position	Date Awarded	Ref.
SEC Freshman of the Week	Justice Carlton	F	December 3, 2024	
SEC Freshman of the Week	Justice Carlton	F	December 23, 2024	
SEC Player of the Week	Taylor Jones	F	January 28, 2025	
SEC Player of the Week	Madison Booker	F	February 11, 2025	

== Rankings ==
Ranking movements Legend: ██ Increase in ranking ██ Decrease in ranking ( ) = First-place votes
	Week																				
Poll	Pre	1	2	3	4	5	6	7	8	9	10	11	12	13	14	15	16	17	18	19	Final
AP	4	4	4	5	4	6	6	5	5	5	7	7	5	4	3	2 (8)	1 (19)	1 (25)	5	5	Not released
Coaches	4	4	4	4 (1)	3 (1)	6	6	6	6	6	7	7	7	6	3	2 (5)	1 (22)	1 (29)	5	5	4

== See also ==
- 2024–25 Texas Longhorns men's basketball team
