= 2024–25 NCAA Division I women's basketball rankings =

- Season: 2024–25
- NCAA Tournament: 2025
- Preseason No. 1: South Carolina
- NCAA Tournament Champions: UConn
NCAA Division I women's basketball rankings


Two human polls maed up the 2024–25 NCAA Division I women's basketball rankings, the AP Poll and the Coaches Poll, in addition to various publications' preseason polls.

== Legend ==
	Increase in ranking
	Decrease in ranking
	Not ranked previous week
Italics	Number of first place votes
(#–#)	Win-loss record
т	Tied with team above or below also with this symbol

== AP Poll ==
The women's basketball poll began during the 1976–77 season, and was initially compiled by Mel Greenberg and published by The Philadelphia Inquirer. At first, it was a poll of coaches conducted via telephone, where coaches identified top teams and a list of the Top 20 teams was produced. The contributors continued to be coaches until 1994, when the AP took over administration of the poll from Greenberg, and switched to a panel of writers.

	Preseason Oct. 15	Week 2 Nov. 11	Week 3 Nov. 18	Week 4 Nov. 25	Week 5 Dec. 2	Week 6 Dec. 9	Week 7 Dec. 16	Week 8 Dec. 23	Week 9 Dec. 30	Week 10 Jan. 6	Week 11 Jan. 13	Week 12 Jan. 20	Week 13 Jan. 27	Week 14 Feb. 3	Week 15 Feb. 10	Week 16 Feb. 17	Week 17 Feb. 24	Week 18 Mar. 3	Week 19 Mar. 10	Week 20 Mar. 17	Final Apr. 7	
1.	South Carolina (27)	South Carolina (2–0) (31)	South Carolina (4–0) (31)	UCLA (5–0) (20)	UCLA (8–0) (25)	UCLA (9–0) (24)	UCLA (10–0) (30)	UCLA (12–0) (30)	UCLA (13–0) (30)	UCLA (15–0) (30)	UCLA (16–0) (29)	UCLA (17–0) (27)	UCLA (20–0) (31)	UCLA (21–0) (32)	UCLA (23–0) (31)	Notre Dame (22–2) (16)	Texas (26–2) (19)	Texas (29–2) (25)	UCLA (30–2) (16)	UCLA (30–2) (19)	UConn (37–3) (31)	1.
2.	UConn (2)	UConn (2–0)	UConn (3–0)	UConn (4–0) (9)	UConn (6–0) (7)	UConn (8–0) (8)	South Carolina (10–1) (1)	South Carolina (11–1) (1)	South Carolina (12–1) (1)	South Carolina (14–1)	South Carolina (16–1)	South Carolina (18–1) (1)	South Carolina (19–1) (1)	South Carolina (21–1)	Notre Dame (21–2)	Texas (26–2) (8)	UCLA (26–1) (11)	USC (26–2) (6)	South Carolina (30–3) (9)	South Carolina (30–3) (8)	South Carolina (35–4)	2.
3.	USC (1)	USC (2–0)	USC (4–0)	Notre Dame (5–0) (3)	South Carolina (7–1)	South Carolina (9–1)	Notre Dame (9–2) (1)	Notre Dame (10–2) (1)	Notre Dame (11–2) (1)	Notre Dame (12–2) (2)	Notre Dame (14–2) (2)	Notre Dame (16–2) (2)	Notre Dame (17–2)	Notre Dame (19–2)	Texas (24–2)	UCLA (24–1) (6)	Notre Dame (24–3)	UConn (28–3)	UConn (30–3) (7)	UConn (31–3) (5)	UCLA (34–3)	3.
4.	Texas	Texas (1–0)	Texas (3–0)	South Carolina (4–1)	Texas (7–0)	LSU (11–0)	UConn (9–1)	USC (11–1)	USC (12–1)	USC (14–1)	USC (16–1)	USC (17–1)	USC (18–1)	Texas (22–2)	South Carolina (22–2)	USC (23–2)	USC (25–2) (2)	UCLA (27–2)	USC (28–3)	USC (28–3)	Texas (35–4)	4.
5.	UCLA	UCLA (2–0)	UCLA (4–0)	Texas (4–0)	LSU (9–0)	USC (8–1)	LSU (12–0)	Texas (12–1)	Texas (13–1)	Texas (15–1)	LSU (18–0)	LSU (20–0)	Texas (20–2)	UConn (21–2)	LSU (25–1)	UConn (24–3)	UConn (26–3)	South Carolina (27–3)	Texas (31–3)	Texas (31–3)	USC (31–4)	5.
6.	Notre Dame	Notre Dame (2–0)	Notre Dame (4–0)	USC (4–1)	USC (6–1)	Texas (8–1)	Texas (10–1)	LSU (14–0)	LSU (15–0)	LSU (17–0)	UConn (15–2)	UConn (17–2)	UConn (19–2)	LSU (23–1)	USC (21–2)	South Carolina (23–3)	South Carolina (25–3)	Notre Dame (25–4)	TCU (31–3)	TCU (31–3)	TCU (34–4)	6.
7.	LSU	LSU (2–0)	LSU (4–0)	LSU (6–0)	Maryland (8–0)	Maryland (10–0)	USC (10–1)	UConn (10–2)	UConn (11–2)	UConn (13–2)	Texas (16–2)	Texas (17–2)	LSU (21–1)	USC (19–2)	UConn (22–3)	LSU (25–2)	LSU (27–2)	NC State (24–5)	Duke (26–7)	Duke (26–7)	Duke (29–8)	7.
8.	Iowa State	Iowa State (3–0)	Iowa State (4–0)	Oklahoma (5–0)	Duke (8–1)	Notre Dame (7–2)	Maryland (10–0)	Maryland (11–0)	Maryland (12–0)	Maryland (14–0)	Maryland (15–1)	Maryland (16–1)	Ohio State (19–1)	Ohio State (20–1)	Kentucky (19–2)	Ohio State (21–3)	North Carolina (25–4)	TCU (28–3)	Notre Dame (26–5)	Notre Dame (26–5)	LSU (31–6)	8.
9.	NC State	Oklahoma (2–0)	Oklahoma (3–0)	Kansas State (5–0)	TCU (8–0)	Duke (9–2)	Duke (9–2)	Oklahoma (11–1)	Oklahoma (12–1)	Ohio State (14–0)	Ohio State (16–0)	TCU (19–1)	TCU (20–2)	TCU (21–2)	Ohio State (20–3)	North Carolina (23–4)	NC State (22–5)	LSU (27–4)	NC State (26–6)	NC State (26–6)	NC State (28–7)	9.
10.	Oklahoma	Kansas State (2–0)	Kansas State (3–0)	Maryland (6–0)	Notre Dame (5–2)	Oklahoma (8–1)	Oklahoma (9–1)	Ohio State (10–0)	Ohio State (13–0)	Oklahoma (13–2)	TCU (17–1)	Kansas State (19–1)	Duke (17–4)	Duke (17–4)	NC State (19–4)	TCU (24–3)	TCU (26–3)	Oklahoma (23–6)	LSU (28–5)	LSU (28–5)	Notre Dame (28–6)	10.
11.	Duke	Maryland (3–0)	Maryland (5–0)	Ohio State (5–0)	Oklahoma (6–1)	Ohio State (8–0)	Ohio State (10–0)	TCU (12–1)	TCU (13–1)	TCU (15–1)	Kansas State (17–1)	Kentucky (16–1)	Kansas State (19–2)	Kentucky (19–2)	TCU (22–3)	Duke (20–5)	Tennessee (21–6)	Duke (23–7)	Oklahoma (25–7)	Oklahoma (25–7)	Oklahoma (27–8)	11.
12.	Baylor	Ohio State (1–0)	Ohio State (3–0)	West Virginia (6–0)	Ohio State (7–0)	TCU (9–1)	TCU (10–1)	Kansas State (13–1)	Kansas State (13–1)	Kansas State (15–1)	Kentucky (15–1)	Ohio State (17–1)	Kentucky (17–2)	Kansas State (21–2)	North Carolina (21–4)	Kansas State (24–3)	Ohio State (23–4)	Kentucky (22–6)	North Carolina (27–7)	North Carolina (27–7)	Maryland (25–8)	12.
13.	Kansas State	NC State (1–1)	West Virginia (4–0)	Duke (5–1)	Kansas State (7–1)	Kansas State (10–1)	Kansas State (11–1)	Georgia Tech (13–0)	Georgia Tech (14–0)	Georgia Tech (15–0)	Oklahoma (14–3)	North Carolina (17–3)	Oklahoma (16–4)	North Carolina (20–4)	Duke (19–5)	NC State (20–5)	Oklahoma (21–6)	Ohio State (24–5)	Kentucky (22–7)	Kentucky (22–7)	Kansas State (28–8)	13.
14.	Ohio State	North Carolina (2–0)	Duke (4–1)	Kentucky (5–0)	Kentucky (7–0)	North Carolina (9–1)	West Virginia (10–1)	Duke (10–3)	Duke (10–3)	Duke (12–3)	North Carolina (15–3)	Duke (15–4)	Maryland (16–4)	NC State (17–4)	Kansas State (22–3)	Kentucky (20–4)	Kansas State (25–4)	North Carolina (25–6)	Baylor (27–7)	Baylor (27–7)	North Carolina (29–8)	14.
15.	North Carolina	West Virginia (2–0)	Kentucky (4–0)	Iowa State (5–1)	West Virginia (8–1)	West Virginia (9–1)	Michigan State (10–0)	Tennessee (11–0)	Tennessee (12–0)	Kentucky (13–1)	Tennessee (14–2)	Oklahoma (15–4)	North Carolina (18–4)	Oklahoma (16–6)	Tennessee (17–6)	Tennessee (19–6)	Kentucky (21–5)	Maryland (23–6)	Ohio State (25–6)	Ohio State (25–6)	Tennessee (24–10)	15.
16.	West Virginia	Duke (2–1)	North Carolina (3–1)	North Carolina (5–1)	North Carolina (7–1)	Kentucky (7–1)	Kentucky (9–1)	Kentucky (10–1)	Kentucky (11–1)	Tennessee (13–1)	Duke (13–4)	West Virginia (15–3)	Michigan State (17–3)	Maryland (17–5)	Oklahoma (17–6)	Oklahoma (19–6)	Duke (21–7)	West Virginia (23–6)	West Virginia (24–7)	West Virginia (24–7)	Kentucky (23–8)	16.
17.	Louisville	Baylor (1–1)	Ole Miss (2–1)	TCU (6–0)	Iowa (8–0)	Michigan State (9–0)	Georgia Tech (11–0)	North Carolina (12–2)	North Carolina (13–2)	West Virginia (12–2)	Georgia Tech (15–2)	Tennessee (15–3)	NC State (16–4)	Georgia Tech (18–4)	Maryland (19–5)	West Virginia (20–5)	Baylor (24–5)	Baylor (25–6)	Oklahoma State (25–6)	Oklahoma State (25–6)	Ole Miss (22–11)	17.
18.	Maryland	Louisville (1–1)	Baylor (3–1)	Ole Miss (3–1)	Ole Miss (5–2)	Iowa State (8–2)	Tennessee (8–0)	West Virginia (10–2)	West Virginia (10–2)	Alabama (15–1)	California (16–2)	Georgia Tech (16–3)	Tennessee (15–4)	West Virginia (17–4)	West Virginia (19–4)	Alabama (20–5)	West Virginia (21–6)	Tennessee (21–8)	Maryland (23–7)	Maryland (23–7)	Baylor (28–8)	18.
19.	Florida State	Ole Miss (1–1)	TCU (4–0)	Illinois (5–0)	Alabama (8–0)	Tennessee (7–0)	North Carolina (10–2)	Michigan State (11–1)	Alabama (13–1)	North Carolina (13–3)	Alabama (16–2)	Alabama (17–3)	California (18–3)	Tennessee (16–5)	Georgia Tech (20–4)	Baylor (22–5)	Maryland (21–6)	Alabama (23–7)	Kansas State (26–7)	Kansas State (26–7)	Ohio State (26–7)	19.
20.	Ole Miss	Kentucky (2–0)	NC State (2–2)	NC State (3–2)	Iowa State (6–2)	Michigan (8–1)	Michigan (9–2)	Alabama (12–1)	California (13–1)	Michigan State (12–2)	West Virginia (13–3)	NC State (14–4)	Georgia Tech (17–4)	Michigan State (18–4)	Oklahoma State (19–4)	Georgia Tech (21–5)	Alabama (22–6)	Kansas State (25–6)	Tennessee (22–9)	Tennessee (22–9)	Alabama (24–9)	20.
21.	Creighton	Nebraska (2–0)	Nebraska (4–0)	Oregon (6–0)	Illinois (6–1)	Iowa (8–1)	NC State (8–3)	California (13–1)	Michigan State (11–2)	NC State (11–3)	NC State (12–4)	Michigan State (15–3)	West Virginia (16–4)	California (19–4)	Alabama (20–5)	Maryland (19–6)	Oklahoma State (22–5)	Oklahoma State (24–5)	Alabama (23–8)	Alabama (23–8)	West Virginia (25–8)	21.
22.	Kentucky	Alabama (3–0)	Illinois (3–0)	Iowa (6–0)	Louisville (5–2)	Ole Miss (6–3)т	Iowa (9–2)	NC State (9–3)	NC State (10–3)	Utah (12–2)	Michigan State (13–3)	California (17–3)	Alabama (17–4)	Florida State (18–4)	Michigan State (18–5)	Michigan State (19–6)	Creighton (23–4)	Florida State (23–7)	Creighton (26–5)	Florida State (23–8)	Florida State (24–9)	22.
23.	Nebraska	Illinois (2–0)	Oregon (4–0)	Alabama (6–0)	Michigan (7–1)	NC State (6–3)т	Nebraska (10–1)	Michigan (10–2)	Iowa (11–2)	Iowa (12–3)	Utah (13–3)	Minnesota (17–2)	Vanderbilt (17–4)	Alabama (18–5)	Florida State (19–5)	Creighton (21–4)	Michigan State (20–7)	Creighton (24–5)	Florida State (23–8)	Creighton (26–6)	South Dakota State (30–4)	23.
24.	Alabama	Stanford (3–0)	Alabama (6–0)	Louisville (4–2)	Michigan State (8–0)	Nebraska (8–1)	California (11–1)	Iowa (10–2)	Michigan (10–3)	California (14–2)	Minnesota (16–1)т	Michigan (13–5)	Oklahoma State (17–3)	Vanderbilt (18–5)	Creighton (20–4)	Oklahoma State (20–5)	Florida State (22–6)	Michigan State (21–8)	South Dakota State (29–3)	South Dakota State (29–3)	Oklahoma State (25–7)	24.
25.	Indiana	Oregon (3–0)	Louisville (2–2)	Nebraska (5–1)	Nebraska (6–1)	Georgia Tech (9–0)	Ole Miss (7–3)	Ole Miss (8–3)	Ole Miss (8–3)	Michigan (10–4)	Oklahoma State (14–2)т	Baylor (16–3)	Florida State (16–4)	Oklahoma State (18–4)	Baylor (20–5)	Illinois (21–5)	Louisville (19–8)	South Dakota State (26–3)	Ole Miss (20–10)	Ole Miss (20–10)	Michigan (23–11)	25.
	Preseason Oct. 15	Week 2 Nov. 11	Week 3 Nov. 18	Week 4 Nov. 25	Week 5 Dec. 2	Week 6 Dec. 9	Week 7 Dec. 16	Week 8 Dec. 23	Week 9 Dec. 30	Week 10 Jan. 6	Week 11 Jan. 13	Week 12 Jan. 20	Week 13 Jan. 27	Week 14 Feb. 3	Week 15 Feb. 10	Week 16 Feb. 17	Week 17 Feb. 24	Week 18 Mar. 3	Week 19 Mar. 10	Week 20 Mar. 17	Final Apr. 7	
		Dropped: No. 19 Florida State; No. 21 Creighton; No. 25 Indiana	Dropped: No. 24 Stanford	Dropped: No. 18 Baylor	Dropped: No. 20 NC State; No. 21 Oregon	Dropped: No. 19 Alabama; No. 21 Illinois; No. 22 Louisville	Dropped: No. 18 Iowa State	Dropped: No. 23 Nebraska	None	Dropped: No. 25 Ole Miss	Dropped: No. 23 Iowa; No. 25 Michigan	Dropped: No. 23 Utah; No. 24 Oklahoma State	Dropped: No. 23 Minnesota; No. 24 Michigan; No. 25 Baylor	None	Dropped: No. 21 California; No. 24 Vanderbilt	Dropped: No. 23 Florida State	Dropped: No. 20 Georgia Tech; No. 25 Illinois	Dropped: No. 25 Louisville	Dropped: No. 24 Michigan State	None	None	

== USA Today Coaches Poll ==
The Coaches Poll is the second oldest poll still in use after the AP Poll. It is compiled by a rotating group of 31 college Division I head coaches. The Poll operates by Borda count. Each voting member ranks teams from 1 to 25. Each team then receives points for their ranking in reverse order: Number 1 earns 25 points, number 2 earns 24 points, and so forth. The points are then combined and the team with the highest points is then ranked No. 1; second highest is ranked No. 2 and so forth. Only the top 25 teams with points are ranked, with teams receiving first place votes noted the quantity next to their name. The maximum points a single team can earn is 775.

	Preseason Oct 24	Week 2 Nov 12	Week 3 Nov 19	Week 4 Nov 26	Week 5 Dec 3	Week 6 Dec 10	Week 7 Dec 17	Week 8 Dec 24	Week 9 Dec 31	Week 10 Jan 7	Week 11 Jan 14	Week 12 Jan 21	Week 13 Jan 28	Week 14 Feb 4	Week 15 Feb 11	Week 16 Feb 18	Week 17 Feb 25	Week 18 Mar 4	Week 19 Mar 11	Week 20 Mar 17	Final Apr 7	
1.	South Carolina (27)	South Carolina (2–0) (29)	South Carolina (4–0) (28)	UConn (5–0) (13)	UCLA (8–0) (16)	UCLA (9–0) (23)	UCLA (11–0) (31)	UCLA (12–0) (30)	UCLA (13–0) (31)	UCLA (15–0) (31)	UCLA (16–0) (30)	UCLA (18–0) (29)	UCLA (20–0) (30)	UCLA (21–0) (29)	UCLA (23–0) (31)	Notre Dame (23–2) (23)	Texas (27–2) (22)	Texas (29–2) (29)	UCLA (30–2) (20)	UCLA (30–2) (21)	UConn (37–3) (31)	1.
2.	UConn (3)	UConn (2–0) (1)	UConn (3–0) (1)	UCLA (5–0) (14)	UConn (6–0) (14)	UConn (8–0) (8)	South Carolina (10–1)	South Carolina (11–1) (1)	South Carolina (12–1)	South Carolina (14–1)	South Carolina (16–1)	South Carolina (18–1) (2)	South Carolina (20–1) (1)	South Carolina (21–1) (2)	Notre Dame (21–2)	Texas (26–2) (5)	UCLA (26–1) (7)	USC (27–2) (1)	South Carolina (30–3) (8)	South Carolina (30–3) (7)	South Carolina (35–4)	2.
3.	USC (1)	USC (2–0) (1)	USC (4–0) (1)	Notre Dame (5–0) (3)	Texas (7–0) (1)	South Carolina (9–1)	LSU (12–0)	LSU (14–0)	Notre Dame (11–2)	Notre Dame (12–2)	Notre Dame (14–2)	Notre Dame (16–2)	Notre Dame (17–2)	Notre Dame (19–2)	Texas (24–2)	UCLA (24–1) (3)	USC (25–2) (1)	UConn (28–3)	UConn (31–3) (3)	UConn (31–3) (3)	UCLA (34–3)	3.
4.	Texas	Texas (1–0)	Texas (3–0)	Texas (4–0) (1)	South Carolina (7–1)	LSU (11–0)	Notre Dame (9–2)	Notre Dame (10–2)	LSU (15–0)	LSU (17–0)	LSU (19–0)	LSU (20–0)	USC (18–1)	LSU (23–1)	South Carolina (22–2)	USC (23–2)	Notre Dame (24–3) (1)	UCLA (28–2)	USC (28–3)	USC (28–3)	Texas (35–4)	4.
5.	Notre Dame	Notre Dame (2–0)	Notre Dame (4–0)	South Carolina (5–1)	LSU (9–0)	USC (8–1)	UConn (9–1)	USC (11–1)	USC (12–1)	USC (14–1)	USC (16–1)	USC (17–1)	LSU (21–1)	UConn (21–2)	LSU (25–1)	UConn (24–3)	UConn (26–3)	South Carolina (27–3) (1)	Texas (31–3)	Texas (31–3)	USC (31–4)	5.
6.	UCLA	UCLA (2–0)	UCLA (4–0)	USC (4–1)	USC (6–1)	Texas (8–1)	Texas (10–1)	Texas (12–1)	Texas (13–1)	Texas (15–1)	UConn (15–2)	UConn (17–2)	UConn (19–2)	Texas (22–2)	USC (21–2)	South Carolina (23–3)	South Carolina (25–3)	Notre Dame (25–4)	TCU (31–3)	TCU (31–3)	TCU (34–4)	6.
7.	LSU	LSU (2–0)	LSU (5–0)	LSU (7–0)	Ohio State (7–0)	Maryland (10–0)	USC (10–1)	UConn (10–2)	Maryland (12–0)	Maryland (14–0)	Texas (16–2)	Texas (18–2)	Texas (20–2)	USC (19–2)	UConn (22–3)	LSU (25–2)	LSU (27–2)	TCU (28–3)	Duke (26–7)	Duke (26–7)	Duke (29–8)	7.
8.	NC State	Iowa State (3–0)	Iowa State (4–0)	Oklahoma (6–0)	Maryland (8–0)	Ohio State (8–0)	Maryland (10–0)	Maryland (11–0)	UConn (11–2)	UConn (13–2)	Ohio State (16–0)	Kansas State (19–1)	Ohio State (19–1)	Ohio State (20–1)	Ohio State (20–3)	Ohio State (22–3)	TCU (26–3)	NC State (24–5)	Notre Dame (26–5)	Notre Dame (26–5)	LSU (31–6)	8.
9.	Iowa State	Oklahoma (2–0)	Oklahoma (3–0)	Ohio State (5–0)	Duke (8–1)	Notre Dame (7–2)	Ohio State (10–0)	Ohio State (12–0)	Ohio State (13–0)	Ohio State (14–0)	Maryland (15–1)	TCU (19–1)	TCU (20–2)	TCU (21–2)	TCU (22–3)	TCU (24–3)	North Carolina (25–4)	LSU (27–4)	NC State (26–6)	NC State (26–6)	Notre Dame (28–6)	9.
10.	Oklahoma	NC State (1–1)	Kansas State (4–0)	West Virginia (6–0)	Notre Dame (5–2)	Duke (9–2)	Duke (9–2)	Oklahoma (11–1)	Oklahoma (12–1)	Kansas State (15–1)	Kansas State (17–1)	Maryland (16–2)	Duke (17–4)	Kansas State (21–2)	Duke (19–5)	North Carolina (23–4)	NC State (22–5)	Oklahoma (23–6)	LSU (28–5)	LSU (28–5)	NC State (28–7)	10.
11.	Duke	Kansas State (2–0)	Ohio State (3–0)	Maryland (6–0)	Oklahoma (6–1)	Oklahoma (8–1)	Oklahoma (9–1)	Kansas State (13–1)	Kansas State (13–1)	Oklahoma (13–2)	TCU (17–1)	Kentucky (16–1)	Kansas State (19–2)	Kentucky (19–2)	NC State (19–4)	Duke (20–6)	Tennessee (21–6)	Duke (23–7)	Oklahoma (25–7)	Oklahoma (25–7)	Oklahoma (27–8)	11.
12.	Baylor	Ohio State (1–0)	West Virginia (4–0)	Kansas State (5–1)	Kansas State (7–1)	Kansas State (10–1)	Kansas State (11–1)	TCU (12–1)	TCU (13–1)	TCU (15–1)	Kentucky (15–1)	Ohio State (17–1)	Oklahoma (16–4)	Duke (17–5)	North Carolina (21–4)	NC State (20–5)	Ohio State (23–4)	Ohio State (24–5)	Kentucky (22–7)	Kentucky (22–7)	North Carolina (29–8)	12.
13.	Kansas State	West Virginia (2–0)	Maryland (5–0)	Duke (6–1)	TCU (8–0)	West Virginia (9–1)	TCU (10–1)	Tennessee (11–0)	Tennessee (12–0)	Georgia Tech (15–0)	Oklahoma (14–3)	North Carolina (17–3)	Kentucky (17–2)	North Carolina (20–4)	Kentucky (19–3)т	Tennessee (19–6)	Oklahoma (21–6)	Kentucky (22–6)	Ohio State (25–6)	Ohio State (25–6)	Kentucky (23–8)	13.
14.	Ohio State	Maryland (3–0)	Duke (4–1)	North Carolina (6–1)	West Virginia (8–1)	North Carolina (9–1)	West Virginia (10–1)	Duke (10–3)	Georgia Tech (14–0)	Duke (12–3)	North Carolina (15–3)	Duke (15–4)	Maryland (16–4)	NC State (18–4)	Kansas State (22–3)т	Kentucky (20–4)	Kentucky (21–5)	North Carolina (25–6)	North Carolina (27–7)	North Carolina (27–7)	Maryland (25–8)	14.
15.	West Virginia	North Carolina (2–0)	North Carolina (3–1)	Iowa State (5–1)	North Carolina (7–1)	TCU (9–1)	Kentucky (9–1)	Kentucky (10–1)	Duke (10–3)	Tennessee (13–1)	Tennessee (14–2)	Oklahoma (15–4)	North Carolina (18–4)	Maryland (17–5)	Maryland (19–5)	Kansas State (24–4)	Duke (21–7)	Maryland (23–6)	West Virginia (24–7)	West Virginia (24–7)т	Kansas State (28–8)	15.
16.	North Carolina	Duke (2–1)	Kentucky (5–0)	Kentucky (5–0)	Kentucky (7–0)	Kentucky (8–1)	Tennessee (8–0)	Georgia Tech (13–0)	Kentucky (11–1)	Kentucky (13–1)	Duke (13–4)	West Virginia (15–3)	NC State (16–4)	Oklahoma (16–6)	Tennessee (17–6)	Oklahoma (19–6)	Kansas State (25–5)	West Virginia (23–6)	Baylor (27–7)	Baylor (27–7)т	Tennessee (24–10)	16.
17.	Louisville	Baylor (1–1)	Baylor (3–1)	NC State (4–2)	Alabama (9–0)	Iowa State (8–2)	Michigan State (10–0)	North Carolina (12–2)	North Carolina (13–2)	West Virginia (12–2)	Georgia Tech (15–2)	Tennessee (15–3)	Michigan State (17–3)	Tennessee (16–5)	Oklahoma (18–6)	West Virginia (21–5)	Maryland (21–6)	Tennessee (21–8)	Maryland (23–7)	Maryland (23–7)	Ohio State (26–7)	17.
18.	Maryland	Louisville (1–1)	NC State (2–2)	Ole Miss (4–1)	Ole Miss (5–2)	Tennessee (7–0)	North Carolina (10–2)	West Virginia (10–2)	West Virginia (10–2)	North Carolina (13–3)	California (16–2)	Georgia Tech (16–3)	California (18–3)	West Virginia (17–4)	West Virginia (19–4)	Maryland (20–6)	Baylor (25–5)	Baylor (25–6)	Kansas State (26–7)	Kansas State (26–7)	Baylor (28–8)	18.
19.	Florida State	Kentucky (2–0)	Nebraska (4–0)	Illinois (5–0)	Iowa State (6–2)	Michigan State (9–0)	NC State (8–3)	Michigan State (11–1)	NC State (10–3)	NC State (11–3)т	Alabama (16–2)	Alabama (17–3)	Tennessee (15–5)	Georgia Tech (18–4)	Georgia Tech (20–4)	Alabama (21–5)	West Virginia (21–6)	Kansas State (25–6)	Tennessee (22–9)	Oklahoma State (25–6)	West Virginia (25–8)	19.
20.	Creighton	Nebraska (2–0)	Ole Miss (3–1)	Alabama (7–0)	Iowa (8–0)	NC State (6–3)	Georgia Tech (11–0)	NC State (9–3)	Alabama (13–1)	Alabama (15–1)т	West Virginia (13–3)	NC State (14–4)	West Virginia (16–4)	Michigan State (18–4)	Alabama (20–5)	Georgia Tech (21–5)	Alabama (22–6)	Alabama (23–7)	Oklahoma State (25–6)	Tennessee (22–9)	Ole Miss (22–11)	20.
21.	Ole Miss	Ole Miss (1–1)	Alabama (6–0)	TCU (6–0)	Illinois (7–1)	Baylor (9–2)	Baylor (9–2)	Alabama (12–1)	Michigan State (11–2)	Michigan State (12–2)	NC State (12–4)	California (17–3)	Georgia Tech (17–4)	California (19–4)	Florida State (19–5)	Michigan State (19–6)	Creighton (23–4)	Oklahoma State (24–5)	Alabama (23–8)	Alabama (23–8)	Alabama (24–9)	21.
22.	Kentucky	Alabama (3–0)	Louisville (2–2)	Baylor (5–2)	Louisville (5–2)	Alabama (9–1)	Iowa (9–2)	Iowa (10–2)	Iowa (11–2)	Utah (12–2)	Michigan State (13–3)	Michigan State (15–3)	Alabama (17–4)	Florida State (18–4)	Michigan State (18–5)	Baylor (22–5)	Michigan State (20–7)	Creighton (24–5)	Creighton (26–6)	Creighton (26–6)	Oklahoma State (25–7)	22.
23.	Nebraska	Stanford (3–0)	Illinois (4–0)	Louisville (4–2)	Baylor (7–2)	Ole Miss (6–3)	Iowa State (9–3)	Baylor (11–2)	California (13–1)	Iowa (12–3)	Utah (13–3)	Baylor (16–4)	Vanderbilt (17–4)	Alabama (18–5)	Oklahoma State (19–4)	Creighton (21–4)	Oklahoma State (22–5)	Florida State (23–7)	South Dakota State (29–3)	South Dakota State (29–3)	South Dakota State (30–4)	23.
24.	Indiana	Illinois (2–0)	TCU (4–0)	Iowa (6–0)	NC State (4–3)	Iowa (8–1)	Alabama (10–1)	California (13–1)	Baylor (11–2)	Florida State (13–2)	Baylor (14–3)	Minnesota (17–2)	Florida State (16–4)	Vanderbilt (18–5)	South Dakota State (21–3)	South Dakota State (23–3)	Florida State (22–6)	South Dakota State (26–3)т	Florida State (23–8)	Florida State (23–8)	Florida State (24–9)	24.
25.	Alabama	South Dakota State (2–0)	Oregon (5–0)	Nebraska (5–1)	Michigan State (8–0)	Illinois (7–2)	Michigan (9–1)	Michigan (10–2)	Ole Miss (9–3)	California (14–2)	Minnesota (16–1)	Nebraska (15–4)	Oklahoma State (17–3)	South Dakota State (19–3)	Creighton (20–4)	Florida State (20–6)	South Dakota State (24–3)	Michigan State (21–8)т	Ole Miss (20–10)	Ole Miss (20–10)	Creighton (26–7)	25.
	Preseason Oct 24	Week 2 Nov 12	Week 3 Nov 19	Week 4 Nov 26	Week 5 Dec 3	Week 6 Dec 10	Week 7 Dec 17	Week 8 Dec 24	Week 9 Dec 31	Week 10 Jan 7	Week 11 Jan 14	Week 12 Jan 21	Week 13 Jan 28	Week 14 Feb 4	Week 15 Feb 11	Week 16 Feb 18	Week 17 Feb 25	Week 18 Mar 4	Week 19 Mar 11	Week 20 Mar 17	Final Apr 7	
		Dropped: No. 19 Florida State; No. 20 Creighton; No. 24 Indiana	Dropped: No. 23 Stanford; No. 25 South Dakota State	Dropped: No. 25 Oregon	Dropped: No. 25 Nebraska	Dropped: No. 22 Louisville	Dropped: No. 23 Ole Miss; No. 25 Illinois	Dropped: No. 23 Iowa State	Dropped: No. 25 Michigan	Dropped: No. 24 Baylor; No. 25 Ole Miss	Dropped: No. 23 Iowa; No. 24 Florida State	Dropped: No. 23 Utah	Dropped: No. 23 Baylor; No. 24 Minnesota; No. 25 Nebraska	Dropped: No. 25 Oklahoma State	Dropped: No. 21 California; No. 24 Vanderbilt	Dropped: No. 23 Oklahoma State	Dropped: No. 20 Georgia Tech	None	Dropped: No. 24т Michigan State	None	None	

== See also ==
- 2024–25 NCAA Division I men's basketball rankings
