= 2023–24 Mississippi State Bulldogs women's basketball team =

Intercollegiate basketball season

2023–24 Mississippi State Bulldogs women's basketball

WBIT, Quarterfinals
- Conference: Southeastern Conference
- Record: 23–12 (8–8 SEC)
- Head coach: Sam Purcell (2nd season)
- Assistant coaches: Michelle Clark-Heard; Tony Dukes; Corry Irvin; Gabe Lazo; Murriel Page
- Home arena: Humphrey Coliseum

2023–24 SEC women's basketball standings
	Conf.				Overall
Team	W		L	PCT	W		L	PCT
No. 1 South Carolina †	16	–	0	1.000	38	–	0	1.000
No. 6 LSU	13	–	3	.813	31	–	6	.838
Ole Miss	12	–	4	.750	24	–	9	.727
Alabama	10	–	6	.625	24	–	10	.706
Tennessee	10	–	6	.625	20	–	13	.606
Vanderbilt	9	–	7	.563	23	–	10	.697
Mississippi State	8	–	8	.500	23	–	12	.657
Auburn	8	–	8	.500	20	–	12	.625
Texas A&M	6	–	10	.375	19	–	13	.594
Arkansas	6	–	10	.375	18	–	15	.545
Florida	5	–	11	.313	16	–	16	.500
Kentucky	4	–	12	.250	12	–	20	.375
Georgia	3	–	13	.188	12	–	18	.400
Missouri	2	–	14	.125	11	–	19	.367
† 2024 SEC tournament winner Rankings from AP poll

The 2023–24 Mississippi State Bulldogs women's basketball team represented Mississippi State University during the 2023–24 NCAA Division I women's basketball season. The Bulldogs, led by second-year head coach Sam Purcell, played their home games at Humphrey Coliseum and competed as members of the Southeastern Conference (SEC).

== Previous season ==
The Bulldogs finished the season 22–11 (9–7 SEC) to finish in a tie for fifth place in the conference. They received an at-large bid to the NCAA tournament, where they defeated Illinois in the First Four and Creighton in the first round before falling to Notre Dame in the second round.

== Offseason ==
=== Departures ===
Mississippi State Departures
Name	Number	Pos.	Height	Year	Hometown	Notes	Ref
Anastasia Hayes	0	G	5'7"	Graduate Student	Murfreesboro, TN	Graduated	
Ahlana Smith	1	G	5'9"	Graduate Student	Charlotte, NC	Graduated	
Asianae Johnson	3	G	5'8"	Graduate Student	Brooklyn, NY	Graduated	
Alasia Hayes	5	G	5'8"	RS Sophomore	Murfreesboro, TN	Transferred to Marshall	
Aislynn Hayes	10	G	5'6"	Senior	Murfreesboro, TN	Transferred to Marshall	
Kourtney Weber	11	G	5'10"	Graduate Student	St. Rose, LA	Graduated	
Mia Moore	12	G	5'8"	RS Freshman	Alpharetta, GA	Transferred to UAB	
Aniya Palmer	15	G/F	6'0"	Freshman	LaGrange, GA	Transferred to Georgia State	
Charlotte Kohl	22	C	6'5"	Junior	Giessen, Germany	Transferred to New Mexico	
Denae Carter	25	F	6'0"	Sophomore	Philadelphia, PA	Transferred to Villanova	

=== 2023 recruiting class ===
College recruiting information
Name	Hometown	School	Height	Weight	Commit date
Quanirah Montague; F	Atlantic City, NJ	Atlantic City HS	6 ft 6 in (1.98 m)	N/A	
Quanirah Montague; F	Recruit ratings: ESPN: (94)				
Mjracle Sheppard; G	Kent, WA	Montverde Academy	5 ft 10 in (1.78 m)	N/A	
Mjracle Sheppard; G	Recruit ratings: ESPN: (93)				
Jasmine Brown-Hagger; G	Shorewood, IL	Example Academy	5 ft 9 in (1.75 m)	N/A	
Jasmine Brown-Hagger; G	Recruit ratings: No ratings found				
Overall recruit ranking:
Note: In many cases, Scout, Rivals, 247Sports, On3, and ESPN may conflict in their listings of height and weight.; In these cases, the average was taken. ESPN grades are on a 100-point scale.; Sources:

=== Incoming transfers ===
Mississippi State incoming transfers
Name	Number	Pos.	Height	Year	Hometown	Previous school
Darrione Rogers	0	G	5'11"	Senior	Chicago, IL	DePaul
Lauren Park-Lane	3	G	5'3"	Graduate Student	Wilmington, DE	Seton Hall
Erynn Barnum	5	F	6'2"	Graduate Student	Little Rock, AR	Arkansas
Meloney Thames	33	G	5'8"	Junior	Choctaw, MS	Jones County Junior College

== Roster ==
2023–24 Mississippi State Bulldogs women's basketball team
Players
Coaches

Pos.	#	Name	Height	Year	Previous school	Hometown
G	0	Darrione Rogers	5 ft 11 in (1.8 m)	Sr	Lake Park HS; DePaul	Chicago, IL (United States) (Illinois)
F	1	Nyayongah Gony	6 ft 4 in (1.93 m)	Jr	Lincoln HS; Miami (FL)	Lincoln, NE (United States) (Nebraska)
G	2	JerKaila Jordan	5 ft 9 in (1.75 m)	Sr	John Curtis Christian School; Tulane	New Orleans, LA (United States) (Louisiana)
G	3	Lauren Park-Lane	5 ft 3 in (1.6 m)	GS	Sanford School; Seton Hall	Wilmington, DE (United States) (Delaware)
F/C	4	Jessika Carter	6 ft 5 in (1.96 m)	GS	Harris County HS	Waverly Hall, GA (United States) (Georgia (U.S. state))
F	5	Erynn Barnum	6 ft 2 in (1.88 m)	GS	Little Rock Central HS; Arkansas	Little Rock, AR (United States) (Arkansas)
G	14	Mjracle Sheppard	5 ft 10 in (1.78 m)	Fr	Montverde Academy	Kent, WA (United States) (Washington (state))
G/F	21	Debreasha Powe	6 ft 1 in (1.85 m)	So	Meridian HS	Meridian, MS (United States) (Mississippi)
G	22	Jasmine Brown-Hagger	5 ft 9 in (1.75 m)	Fr	Example Academy	Shorewood, IL (United States) (Illinois)
F	23	Ramani Parker	6 ft 4 in (1.93 m)	Sr	Montverde Academy; Louisville	Fresno, CA (United States) (California)
F	24	Quanirah Montague	6 ft 6 in (1.98 m)	Fr	Atlantic City HS	Atlantic City, NJ (United States) (New Jersey)
G	33	Meloney Thames	5 ft 8 in (1.73 m)	Jr	Choctaw Central HS; Jones County JC	Choctaw, MS (United States) (Mississippi)

Head coach

- Sam Purcell (Auburn)

Assistant coach(es)

- Michelle Clark-Heard (Western Kentucky)
- Tony Dukes (Clayton State)
- Corry Irvin (Fresno State)
- Gabe Lazo (Barry)
- Murriel Page (Florida)

Legend

- (C) Team captain
- (S) Suspended
- (I) Ineligible
- (W) Walk-on
- Injured
- Current redshirt

Roster

== Schedule and results ==
Date time, TV	Rank^{#}	Opponent^{#}	Result	Record	High points	High rebounds	High assists	Site (attendance) city, state
Non-conference regular season
November 6, 2023*; 6:30 p.m., SECN+	No. 25	Alcorn State	W 77–42	1–0	26 – Jordan	13 – Tied	7 – Park-Lane	Humphrey Coliseum (4,452); Starkville, MS
November 10, 2023*; 6:30 p.m., SECN+	No. 25	Southeastern Louisiana	W 67–46	2–0	19 – Powe	9 – Powe	5 – Park–Lane	Humphrey Coliseum (4,531); Starkville, MS
November 12, 2023*; 2:00 p.m., SECN+	No. 25	Jacksonville State	W 84–45	3–0	16 – Jordan	8 – Barnum	4 – Tied	Humphrey Coliseum (4,354); Starkville, MS
November 15, 2023*; 11:00 a.m., SECN+		New Orleans	W 87–26	4–0	24 – Jordan	13 – Carter	4 – Park–Lane	Humphrey Coliseum (6,427); Starkville, MS
November 19, 2023*; 2:00 p.m., ESPN+		at Belmont	W 63–62	5–0	17 – Carter	9 – Barnum	2 – Jordan	Curb Event Center (1,307); Nashville, TN
November 24, 2023*; 6:30 p.m., ESPN+	No. 25	vs. Clemson; Van Chancellor Classic	W 81–78	6–0	24 – Jordan	5 – Tied	9 – Park–Lane	Merrell Center (257); Katy, TX
November 25, 2023*; 4:00 p.m., ESPN+	No. 25	vs. Arkansas–Pine Bluff; Van Chancellor Classic	W 77–68	7–0	20 – Jordan	12 – Barnum	8 – Park-Lane	Merrell Center (545); Katy, TX
November 26, 2023*; 6:00 p.m., ESPN+	No. 25	vs. Tulsa; Van Chancellor Classic	W 102–58	8–0	24 – Powe	13 – Jordan	10 – Park-Lane	Merrell Center (257); Katy, TX
November 29, 2023*; 6:15 p.m., SECN	No. 21	Miami (FL); ACC–SEC Challenge	L 68–74	8–1	20 – Park-Lane	10 – Gony	10 – Park-Lane	Humphrey Coliseum (5,135); Starkville, MS
December 3, 2023*; 1:00 p.m., ESPN+	No. 21	at Chattanooga	L 53–59	8–2	19 – Jordan	10 – Jordan	4 – Park-Lane	McKenzie Arena (2,170); Chattanooga, TN
December 11, 2023*; 6:30 p.m., SECN+		Kennesaw State	W 91–50	9–2	31 – Carter	13 – Carter	9 – Tied	Humphrey Coliseum (4,085); Starkville, MS
December 14, 2023*; 6:30 p.m., SECN+		Jackson State	W 82–72	10–2	21 – Powe	18 – Carter	8 – Park-Lane	Humphrey Coliseum (4,423); Starkville, MS
December 17, 2023*; 2:00 p.m., ESPN+		at Memphis	W 81–63	11–2	21 – Jordan	13 – Carter	4 – Park-Lane	Elma Roane Fieldhouse (1,636); Memphis, TN
December 20, 2023*; 6:30 p.m.		at Colorado State	W 82–75	12–2	33 – Park-Lane	13 – Barnum	6 – Tied	Moby Arena (2,126); Fort Collins, CO
December 29, 2023*; 6:30 p.m., SECN+		Mississippi Valley State	W 99–35	13–2	17 – Jordan	15 – Barnum	10 – Rogers	Humphrey Coliseum (4,772); Starkville, MS
SEC regular season
January 4, 2024; 6:30 p.m., SECN+		Vanderbilt	L 66–71	13–3 (0–1)	21 – Jordan	12 – Carter	6 – Park-Lane	Humphrey Coliseum (4,261); Starkville, MS
January 7, 2024; 12:00 p.m., ESPN		at No. 1 South Carolina	L 66–85	13–4 (0–2)	25 – Jordan	6 – Tied	3 – Tied	Colonial Life Arena (15,751); Columbia, SC
January 11, 2024; 8:00 p.m., SECN		at Arkansas	W 66–63	14–4 (1–2)	22 – Carter	19 – Carter	7 – Park-Lane	Bud Walton Arena (2,627); Fayetteville, AR
January 14, 2024; 4:00 p.m., SECN/ESPN2		Ole Miss	W 69–57	15–4 (2–2)	23 – Carter	8 – Barnum	8 – Park-Lane	Humphrey Coliseum (7,101); Starkville, MS
January 18, 2024; 4:00 p.m., SECN		Tennessee	L 64–75	15–5 (2–3)	15 – Barnum	12 – Barnum	5 – Park-Lane	Humphrey Coliseum (5,507); Starkville, MS
January 22, 2024; 6:00 p.m., SECN		at Florida	W 89–77	16–5 (3–3)	21 – Jordan	15 – Carter	4 – Park-Lane	O'Connell Center (1,587); Gainesville, FL
January 29, 2024; 6:00 p.m., ESPN2		No. 9 LSU	W 77–73	17–5 (4–3)	24 – Jordan	6 – Carter	5 – Sheppard	Humphrey Coliseum (9,121); Starkville, MS
February 1, 2024; 6:00 p.m., SECN+		at Kentucky	W 77–74 ^{OT}	18–5 (5–3)	25 – Carter	13 – Carter	6 – Sheppard	Rupp Arena (3,743); Lexington, KY
February 4, 2024; 3:00 p.m., SECN		at Texas A&M	W 74–63	19–5 (6–3)	22 – Barnum	11 – Jordan	6 – Park-Lane	Reed Arena (4,072); College Station, TX
February 8, 2024; 6:30 p.m., SECN+		Georgia	W 76–57	20–5 (7–3)	19 – Jordan	12 – Carter	9 – Park-Lane	Humphrey Coliseum (6,137); Starkville, MS
February 11, 2024; 2:00 p.m., SECN+		Florida	L 70–90	20–6 (7–4)	16 – Carter	13 – Carter	7 – Park-Lane	Humphrey Coliseum (6,097); Starkville, MS
February 18, 2024; 3:00 p.m., SECN+		at Ole Miss	L 71–75 ^{OT}	20–7 (7–5)	18 – Jordan	9 – Carter	8 – Park-Lane	SJB Pavilion (4,736); Oxford, MS
February 22, 2024; 6:30 p.m., SECN+		Kentucky	L 68–78	20–8 (7–6)	20 – Carter	20 – Carter	6 – Park-Lane	Humphrey Coliseum (5,975); Starkville, MS
February 25, 2024; 4:00 p.m., SECN		at Alabama	L 75–87	20–9 (7–7)	18 – Carter	14 – Carter	9 – Park-Lane	Coleman Coliseum (2,980); Tuscaloosa, AL
February 29, 2024; 7:00 p.m., SECN+		at Auburn	L 60–77	20–10 (7–8)	16 – Carter	10 – Jordan	5 – Park-Lane	Neville Arena (2,818); Auburn, AL
March 3, 2024; 2:00 p.m., SECN+		Missouri	W 90–75	21–10 (8–8)	22 – Tied	8 – Rogers	9 – Park-Lane	Humphrey Coliseum (6,297); Starkville, MS
SEC Tournament
March 7, 2024; 11:00 a.m., SECN	(8)	vs. (9) Texas A&M; Second Round	L 56–72	21–11	12 – Tied	8 – Carter	3 – Tied	Bon Secours Wellness Arena (6,144); Greenville, SC
WBIT
March 21, 2024*; 6:30 p.m., ESPN+	(2)	Georgia Tech; First Round	W 84–47	22–11	17 – Brown-Hagger	8 – Powe	6 – Park-Lane	Humphrey Coliseum (1,683); Starkville, MS
March 24, 2024*; 2:00 p.m., ESPN+	(2)	(3) TCU; Second Round	W 68–61	23–11	17 – Carter	8 – Carter	8 – Park-Lane	Humphrey Coliseum (1,607); Starkville, MS
March 28, 2024*; 5:00 p.m., ESPN+	(2)	at (1) Penn State; Quarterfinals	L 87–92	23–12	36 – Jordan	8 – Carter	3 – Tied	Bryce Jordan Center (1,823); University Park, PA
*Non-conference game. ^{#}Rankings from AP Poll. (#) Tournament seedings in parentheses. All times are in Central Time.

== Rankings ==
Ranking movements Legend: ██ Increase in ranking ██ Decrease in ranking — = Not ranked RV = Received votes
	Week																				
Poll	Pre	1	2	3	4	5	6	7	8	9	10	11	12	13	14	15	16	17	18	19	Final
AP	25	RV	25	21	RV	RV	RV	RV	RV	RV	—	—	RV	RV	RV	RV	RV	—	—	—	Not released
Coaches	RV	RV	RV	21	RV	RV	RV	—	—	—	—	—	—	RV	RV	—	—	—	—	—	

== See also ==
- 2023–24 Mississippi State Bulldogs men's basketball team
