= Sam Purcell =

American basketball coach (born 1979)

Current position
- Title: Head coach
- Team: Mississippi State
- Conference: SEC
- Record: 85–48 (.639)

Biographical details
- Born: October 5, 1979 (age 47); Dalton, Georgia, U.S.
- Education: Auburn University (BA)

Playing career
- 1999–2000: Southern Union State CC

Coaching career (HC unless noted)
- 2000–2003: Auburn (student assistant)
- 2005–2007: Tulsa (assistant)
- 2009–2013: Georgia Tech (assistant)
- 2013–2017: Louisville (assistant)
- 2017–2022: Louisville (associate HC)
- 2022–present: Mississippi State

Administrative career (AD unless noted)
- 2003–2005: Auburn (video coordinator/admin assistant)
- 2007–2009: Georgia Tech (video coordinator)

Head coaching record
- Overall: 85–48 (.639)
- Tournaments: 2–2 (.500)

Sam Purcell (born October 5, 1979) is the current head coach of the Mississippi State Bulldogs women's basketball team. He was previously an assistant at Louisville, Georgia Tech and Tulsa. He began his coaching career as a student coach at Auburn.

== Head coaching record ==
Record table
Season	Team	Overall	Conference	Standing	Postseason
Mississippi State Bulldogs (Southeastern Conference) (2022–present)
2022–23	Mississippi State	22–11	9–7	T–5th	NCAA Second Round
2023–24	Mississippi State	23–12	8–8	T–7th	WBIT Quarterfinals
2024–25	Mississippi State	22–12	7–9	10th	NCAA Second Round
2025–26	Mississippi State	18–13	5–11	T–12th	
Mississippi State:		85–48 (.639)	29–35 (.453)		
Total:		85–48 (.639)			
