= Vic Schaefer =

American basketball coach

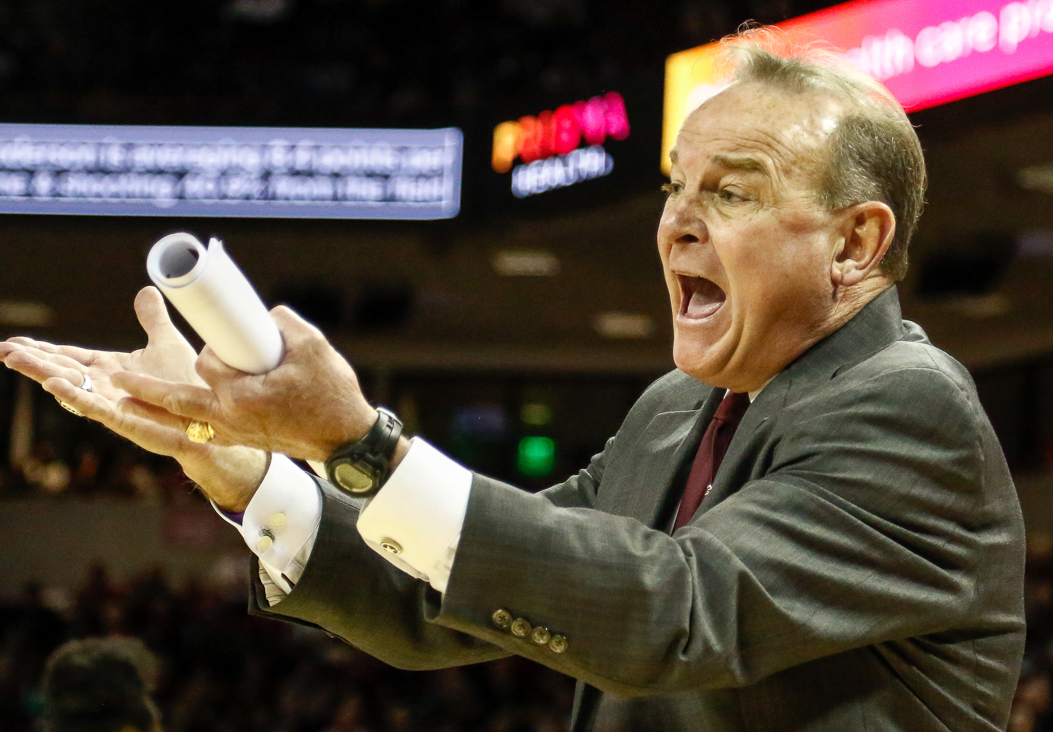
- Schaefer in 2020

Current position
- Title: Head coach
- Team: Texas
- Conference: SEC
- Record: 179–40 (.817)

Biographical details
- Born: March 2, 1961 (age 65); Austin, Texas, U.S.
- Education: Texas A&M

Coaching career (HC unless noted)
- 1987–1989: Sam Houston State (assist.)
- 1990–1997: Sam Houston State
- 1997–2000: Arkansas (assist.)
- 2000–2003: Arkansas (assoc. HC)
- 2003–2012: Texas A&M (assoc.)
- 2012–2020: Mississippi State
- 2020–present: Texas

Head coaching record
- Overall: 480–212 (.694)

Accomplishments and honors

Championships
- 4× NCAA Regional—Final Four (2017, 2018, 2025, 2026); 2× Big 12 Tournament (2022, 2024); 2× SEC Tournament (2019, 2026); 3× SEC Regular Season (2018, 2019, 2025); Big 12 Regular Season (2023); NCAA Division I Tournament (2011, as assoc. HC); WNIT (1999, as assistant)

Awards
- Naismith Women's College Coach of the Year (2018); USBWA National Coach of the Year (2018); WBCA National Coach of the Year (2018); Big 12 Coach of the Year (2023); 4× SEC Coach of the Year (2015, 2018, 2019, 2025)

Victor Ernest Schaefer (born March 2, 1961) is an American college basketball coach who is the head women's basketball coach of the University of Texas at Austin (Texas) Longhorns, since April 2020. He previously served as the head coach for Mississippi State from 2012 to 2020 and Sam Houston State from 1990 to 1997.

== Mississippi State ==
Schaefer was named the Bulldogs’ head coach on March 13, 2012, replacing Sharon Fanning-Otis who retired at the end of the 2012 season. In his tenure at MSU Schaefer has led the Bulldogs to five NCAA tournaments, Four Sweet Sixteen appearances, 3 Elite 8 appearances, 2 Final Fours, and 2 National Runner-up finishes. He also guided MSU to 2 SEC Championship and 1 SEC Tournament Championship, the only conference titles for MSU in any women's team sport. The 2016–17 team made college basketball history by defeating No. 1 Connecticut 66–64 in overtime in the Final Four of the NCAA Tournament. That victory snapped the Huskies’ record 111-game win streak and sent the Bulldogs to the national championship game in their first Final Four appearance. The UConn win garnered MSU the 2017 ESPY for Best Upset and Morgan William a Best Play nomination for her winning bucket.

With a 74–68 win at Marquette on November 25, 2019, Schaefer earned his 200th victory as the head coach at Mississippi State. It was just his 256th game at State, making him the second-fastest coach ever to achieve the milestone with an SEC program ahead of hall-of-fame coaches Joe Ciampi (258 games), Pat Summitt (259), Van Chancellor (263), Jim Foster (280) and Sue Gunter (280). Only Georgia's Andy Landers (251) reached the mark at a faster pace.

== Texas ==
Shortly after the COVID-19 pandemic prematurely ended the 2019–20 season, Schaefer left Mississippi State to fill the head coaching vacancy at Texas. The timing of the move was unfortunate, as it came shortly after he and his wife had completed a new house on an 80-acre (32 ha) farm near the Bulldogs' home of Starkville. Nonetheless, in June 2020, Schaefer told M.A. Voepel of ESPN,

Texas is where I'm from. I will be 65 miles from where I spent weekends at my grandmother's house, and where my mother and father are buried, in La Grange, Texas. I'll be 2 hours and 40 minutes from my older sister, who was also my kindergarten teacher.

Voepel added more detail to Schaefer's ties to the state, noting:

Schaefer was born in Austin at a hospital across the street from where the Longhorns' Frank Erwin Center would later be built. He grew up in Houston, graduated from Texas A&M, and spent most of his coaching career in the Lone Star State.

== Head coaching record ==
Record table
| Season | Team | Overall | Conference | Standing | Postseason |
|---|---|---|---|---|---|
Sam Houston State Bearkats (Southland Conference) (1990–1997)
| 1990–91 | Sam Houston State | 11–16 | 5–9 | 6th | |
| 1991–92 | Sam Houston State | 9–18 | 5–13 | 7th | |
| 1992–93 | Sam Houston State | 6–20 | 3–15 | 9th | |
| 1993–94 | Sam Houston State | 10–17 | 4–14 | 8th | |
| 1994–95 | Sam Houston State | 13–14 | 10–8 | 4th | |
| 1995–96 | Sam Houston State | 18–10 | 14–5 | 3rd | |
| 1996–97 | Sam Houston State | 13–15 | 8–8 | 4th | |
| Sam Houston State: | | 80–110 (.421) | 49–72 (.405) | | |
Mississippi State (Lady) Bulldogs (Southeastern Conference) (2012–2020)
| 2012–13 | Mississippi State | 13–17 | 5–11 | T–11th | |
| 2013–14 | Mississippi State | 22–14 | 5–11 | 13th | WNIT Quarterfinals |
| 2014–15 | Mississippi State | 27–7 | 11–5 | 3rd | NCAA Second Round |
| 2015–16 | Mississippi State | 28–8 | 11–5 | T–2nd | NCAA Sweet Sixteen |
| 2016–17 | Mississippi State | 34–5 | 13-3 | 2nd | NCAA Runner-Up |
| 2017–18 | Mississippi State | 37–2 | 16–0 | 1st | NCAA Runner-Up |
| 2018–19 | Mississippi State | 33–3 | 15–1 | 1st | NCAA Elite Eight |
| 2019–20 | Mississippi State | 27–6 | 13–3 | 2nd | NCAA Tournament Canceled† |
| Mississippi State: | | 221–62 (.781) | 89–39 (.695) | | |
Texas Longhorns (Big 12 Conference) (2020–2024)
| 2020–21 | Texas | 21–10 | 11–7 | 5th | NCAA Elite Eight |
| 2021–22 | Texas | 29–7 | 13–5 | 3rd | NCAA Elite Eight |
| 2022–23 | Texas | 26–10 | 14–4 | T–1st | NCAA Second Round |
| 2023–24 | Texas | 33–5 | 14–4 | 2nd | NCAA Elite Eight |
Texas Longhorns (Southeastern Conference) (2024–present)
| 2024–25 | Texas | 35–4 | 15–1 | T–1st | NCAA Final Four |
| 2025–26 | Texas | 35–4 | 13–3 | 3rd | NCAA Final Four |
| Texas: | | 179–40 (.817) | 80–24 (.769) | | |
| Total: | | 480–212 (.694) | | | |
National champion Postseason invitational champion Conference regular season champion Conference regular season and conference tournament champion Division regular season champion Division regular season and conference tournament champion Conference tournament champion

†NCAA canceled all postseason activities for all college sports due to the COVID-19 pandemic.
