= 2024–25 South Carolina Gamecocks women's basketball team =

Intercollegiate basketball season

2024–25 South Carolina Gamecocks women's basketball

SEC regular season co-champions SEC tournament champions Hall of Fame Series champions Coast-to-Coast Challenge champions Fort Myers Tip-Off Island Division champions

NCAA tournament runner-up
- Conference: Southeastern Conference

Ranking
- Coaches: No. 2
- AP: No. 2
- Record: 35–4 (15–1 SEC)
- Head coach: Dawn Staley (17th season)
- Assistant coaches: Lisa Boyer; Winston Gandy; Jolette Law; Khadijah Sessions; Mary Wooley
- Home arena: Colonial Life Arena

2024–25 SEC women's basketball standings
	Conf.				Overall
Team	W		L	PCT	W		L	PCT
No. 2 South Carolina †	15	–	1	.938	35	–	4	.897
No. 5 Texas	15	–	1	.938	35	–	4	.897
No. 10 LSU	12	–	4	.750	31	–	6	.838
No. 13 Kentucky	11	–	5	.688	23	–	8	.742
No. 11 Oklahoma	11	–	5	.688	27	–	8	.771
No. 21 Alabama	10	–	6	.625	24	–	9	.727
No. 25 Ole Miss	10	–	6	.625	22	–	11	.667
Vanderbilt	8	–	8	.500	22	–	11	.667
No. 20 Tennessee	8	–	8	.500	24	–	10	.706
Mississippi State	7	–	9	.438	22	–	12	.647
Florida	5	–	11	.313	19	–	18	.514
Georgia	4	–	12	.250	13	–	19	.406
Arkansas	3	–	13	.188	10	–	22	.313
Auburn	3	–	13	.188	12	–	18	.400
Missouri	3	–	13	.188	14	–	18	.438
Texas A&M	3	–	13	.188	10	–	19	.345
† 2025 SEC tournament winner Rankings from AP poll

The 2024–25 South Carolina Gamecocks women's basketball team represented the University of South Carolina during the 2024–25 NCAA Division I women's basketball season. The Gamecocks, led by seventeenth-year head coach Dawn Staley, played their home games at Colonial Life Arena and competed as members of the Southeastern Conference (SEC). The team finished with an overall record of 35–4 (15–1 SEC), winning both the SEC regular season and tournament championships along the way. South Carolina advanced all the way to the championship game in the 2025 tournament. In the final UConn prevailed over South Carolina 82–59.

== Previous season ==
The Gamecocks finished the season undefeated with a perfect 38–0, including 16–0 in SEC conference play. They won the regular season and SEC tournament championships and received an automatic bid to the NCAA tournament, where they defeated Iowa in the championship game to win their third national championship.

== Offseason ==
=== Departures ===
South Carolina Departures
Name	Number	Pos.	Height	Year	Hometown	Notes	Ref
Kamilla Cardoso	10	C	6'7"	Senior	Montes Claros, Brazil	Drafted third overall by the Chicago Sky	
Sahnya Jah	24	F	6'0"	Freshman	Alexandria, VA	Transferred to Arizona	

=== 2024 recruiting class ===
College recruiting information
Name	Hometown	School	Height	Weight	Commit date
Joyce Edwards; F	Camden, SC	Camden HS	6 ft 3 in (1.91 m)	N/A	
Joyce Edwards; F	Recruit ratings: ESPN: (98)				
Maddy McDaniel; G	Upper Marlboro, MD	Bishop McNamara HS	5 ft 9 in (1.75 m)	N/A	
Maddy McDaniel; G	Recruit ratings: ESPN: (97)				
Adhel Tac; F	Grand Prairie, TX	South Grand Prairie HS	6 ft 5 in (1.96 m)	N/A	
Adhel Tac; F	Recruit ratings: ESPN: (96)				
Overall recruit ranking:
Note: In many cases, Scout, Rivals, 247Sports, On3, and ESPN may conflict in their listings of height and weight.; In these cases, the average was taken. ESPN grades are on a 100-point scale.; Sources:

=== Incoming transfers ===
South Carolina incoming transfers
Name	Number	Pos.	Height	Year	Hometown	Previous school	Ref
Maryam Dauda	30	F	6'4"	Junior	Bentonville, AR	Arkansas	

== Roster ==
2024–25 South Carolina Gamecocks women's basketball team
Players
Coaches

Pos.	#	Name	Height	Year	Previous school	Hometown
G	0	Te-Hina Paopao	5 ft 9 in (1.75 m)	Sr	La Jolla Country Day School; Oregon	Oceanside, CA
G	1	Maddy McDaniel	5 ft 9 in (1.75 m)	Fr	Bishop McNamara	Upper Marlboro, MD
F	2	Ashlyn Watkins	6 ft 3 in (1.91 m)	Jr	Cardinal Newman HS	Columbia, SC
G	5	Tessa Johnson	6 ft 0 in (1.83 m)	So	St. Michael-Albertville HS	Albertville, MN
F	8	Joyce Edwards	6 ft 3 in (1.91 m)	Fr	Camden	Camden, SC
G	12	MiLaysia Fulwiley	5 ft 10 in (1.78 m)	So	W.J. Keenan HS	Columbia, SC
G	15	Adhel Tac	6 ft 5 in (1.96 m)	RS Fr	South Grand Prairie	Grand Prairie, TX
F	20	Sania Feagin	6 ft 3 in (1.91 m)	Sr	Forest Park HS	Ellenwood, GA
F	21	Chloe Kitts	6 ft 2 in (1.88 m)	Jr	DME Academy	Oviedo, FL
G	23	Bree Hall	6 ft 0 in (1.83 m)	Sr	Wayne HS	Dayton, OH
G	25	Raven Johnson	5 ft 9 in (1.75 m)	Jr	Westlake HS	Atlanta, GA
F	30	Maryam Dauda	6 ft 4 in (1.93 m)	Jr	Bentonville; Arkansas	Bentonville, AR
C	35	Sakima Walker	6 ft 5 in (1.96 m)	Sr	Columbus Africentric Early College; Northwest Florida State College	Columbus, OH

Head coach

- Dawn Staley (Virginia)

Assistant coach(es)

- Lisa Boyer (Ithaca)
- Winston Gandy (Maryland)
- Jolette Law (Iowa)
- Khadijah Sessions (South Carolina)
- Mary Wooley (USC Aiken)

Legend

- (C) Team captain
- (S) Suspended
- (I) Ineligible
- (W) Walk-on
- Injured
- Current redshirt

Roster

== Preseason ==
=== SEC Media Poll ===
SEC media poll
Predicted finish	Team
1	South Carolina
2	Texas
3	LSU
4	Oklahoma
5	Ole Miss
6	Alabama
7	Tennessee
8	Kentucky
9	Florida
10	Vanderbilt
11	Mississippi State
12	Auburn
13	Texas A&M
14	Georgia
15	Missouri
16	Arkansas

== Schedule and results ==
Date time, TV	Rank^{#}	Opponent^{#}	Result	Record	High points	High rebounds	High assists	Site (attendance) city, state
Exhibition
October 15, 2024*; 9:00 p.m., ESPN+	No. 1	at Memphis; Hoops for St. Jude Tip Off Classic	W 106–63	–	19 – Edwards	13 – Kitts	4 – Tied	FedExForum (8,748); Memphis, TN
October 28, 2024*; 7:00 p.m.	No. 1	Clayton State	W 126–42	–	24 – Fulwiley	11 – Edwards	6 – Edwards	Colonial Life Arena (3,179); Columbia, SC
Regular season
November 4, 2024*; 7:30 p.m., TNT	No. 1	vs. Michigan; Hall of Fame Series	W 68–62	1–0	19 – Kitts	14 – Kitts	4 – Paopao	T-Mobile Arena; Paradise, NV
November 10, 2024*; 3:00 p.m., ESPN	No. 1	vs. No. 9 NC State; Ally Tipoff	W 71–57	2–0	23 – Paopao	9 – R. Johnson	3 – Paopao	Spectrum Center (15,424); Charlotte, NC
November 14, 2024*; 7:00 p.m., SECN+/ESPN+	No. 1	Coppin State	W 92–60	3–0	23 – Fulwiley	10 – Kitts	5 – Paopao	Colonial Life Arena (15,550); Columbia, SC
November 17, 2024*; 2:00 p.m., SECN+/ESPN+	No. 1	East Carolina	W 95–44	4–0	14 – Kitts	7 – Kitts	6 – McDaniel	Colonial Life Arena (18,000); Columbia, SC
November 20, 2024*; 5:00 p.m., ESPN2	No. 1	at Clemson; Rivalry	W 77–45	5–0	13 – Paopao	11 – Watkins	3 – Tied	Littlejohn Coliseum (5,008); Clemson, SC
November 24, 2024*; 4:00 p.m., FS1	No. 1	at No. 5 UCLA	L 62–77	5–1	18 – Paopao	7 – Kitts	4 – McDaniel	Pauley Pavilion (13,659); Los Angeles, CA
November 28, 2024*; 1:30 p.m., FOX	No. 4	vs. No. 15 Iowa State; Fort Myers Tip-Off	W 76–36	6–1	13 – Tied	11 – Edwards	4 – McDaniel	Suncoast Credit Union Arena (2,122); Fort Myers, FL
November 30, 2024*; 11:00 a.m., WSN	No. 4	vs. Purdue; Fort Myers Tip-Off	W 99–51	7–1	14 – Fulwiley	9 – Tied	4 – McDaniel	Suncoast Credit Union Arena (1,913); Fort Myers, FL
December 5, 2024*; 9:00 p.m., ESPN	No. 3	No. 8 Duke; ACC–SEC Challenge	W 81–70	8–1	21 – Kitts	11 – Kitts	4 – R. Johnson	Colonial Life Arena (15,677); Columbia, SC
December 8, 2024*; 7:00 p.m., ESPN2	No. 3	vs. No. 9 TCU; Coast-to-Coast Challenge	W 85–52	9–1	20 – Fulwiley	12 – Kitts	4 – Paopao	Dickies Arena (8,004); Fort Worth, TX
December 15, 2024*; 2:00 p.m., SECN	No. 3	South Florida	W 78–62	10–1	15 – Edwards	8 – Watkins	6 – R. Johnson	Colonial Life Arena (16,501); Columbia, SC
December 19, 2024*; 7:00 p.m., SECN+/ESPN+	No. 2	Charleston Southern	W 82–46	11–1	20 – Edwards	7 – R. Johnson	5 – McDaniel	Colonial Life Arena (15,154); Columbia, SC
December 29, 2024*; 2:00 p.m., SECN	No. 2	Wofford	W 93–47	12–1	13 – R. Johnson	8 – Tied	4 – Paopao	Colonial Life Arena (17,711); Columbia, SC
January 2, 2025; 7:00 p.m., SECN	No. 2	at Missouri	W 83–52	13–1 (1–0)	17 – Fulwiley	11 – Watkins	2 – Tied	Mizzou Arena (5,154); Columbia, MO
January 5, 2025; 2:00 p.m., SECN	No. 2	at Mississippi State	W 95–68	14–1 (2–0)	17 – Kitts	10 – Kitts	5 – Tied	Humphrey Coliseum (6,164); Starkville, MS
January 9, 2025; 5:00 p.m., ESPN2	No. 2	Texas A&M	W 90–49	15–1 (3–0)	12 – Feagin	7 – Kitts	6 – Paopao	Colonial Life Arena (15,479); Columbia, SC
January 12, 2025; 1:00 p.m., ESPN	No. 2	No. 5 Texas	W 67–50	16–1 (4–0)	11 – Tied	10 – R. Johnson	3 – Tied	Colonial Life Arena (18,000); Columbia, SC
January 16, 2025; 7:00 p.m., SECN+/ESPN+	No. 2	at No. 19 Alabama	W 76–58	17–1 (5–0)	21 – Edwards	13 – Kitts	5 – Tied	Coleman Coliseum (3,669); Tuscaloosa, AL
January 19, 2025; 3:00 p.m., ESPN	No. 2	No. 13 Oklahoma; We Back Pat	W 101–60	18–1 (6–0)	17 – Edwards	7 – Feagin	8 – R. Johnson	Colonial Life Arena (18,000); Columbia, SC
January 24, 2025; 5:00 p.m., ESPN	No. 2	No. 5 LSU; Rivalry	W 66–56	19–1 (7–0)	14 – Edwards	7 – Tied	3 – Tied	Colonial Life Arena (18,000); Columbia, SC
January 27, 2025; 7:00 p.m., ESPN2	No. 2	at No. 18 Tennessee	W 70–63	20–1 (8–0)	18 – Edwards	7 – Kitts	4 – Paopao	Thompson–Boling Arena (12,033); Knoxville, TN
February 2, 2025; 12:00 p.m., SECN	No. 2	Auburn	W 83–66	21–1 (9–0)	18 – Edwards	9 – Kitts	7 – R. Johnson	Colonial Life Arena (18,000); Columbia, SC
February 6, 2025; 6:00 p.m., SECN+/ESPN+	No. 2	at Georgia	W 74–42	22–1 (10–0)	13 – Fulwiley	9 – Feagin	5 – Feagin	Stegeman Coliseum (6,031); Athens, GA
February 9, 2025; 2:00 p.m., ESPN	No. 2	at No. 4 Texas	L 62–66	22–2 (10–1)	13 – Fulwiley	6 – Feagin	3 – Tied	Moody Center (10,517); Austin, TX
February 13, 2025; 7:00 p.m., SECN	No. 4	Florida	W 101–63	23–2 (10–1)	28 – Edwards	12 – Kitts	7 – Paopao	Colonial Life Arena (16,708); Columbia, SC
February 16, 2025*; 1:00 p.m., ABC	No. 4	No. 7 UConn; College GameDay	L 58–87	23–3	17 – Edwards	5 – Tied	3 – R. Johnson	Colonial Life Arena (18,000); Columbia, SC
February 20, 2025; 7:00 p.m., SECN	No. 6	Arkansas	W 95–55	24–3 (12–1)	18 – Edwards	13 – Kitts	6 – T. Johnson	Colonial Life Arena (16,638); Columbia, SC
February 23, 2025; 3:00 p.m., SECN+/ESPN+	No. 6	at Vanderbilt	W 82–54	25–3 (13–1)	17 – Edwards	12 – Edwards	4 – Paopao	Memorial Gymnasium (7,805); Nashville, TN
February 27, 2025; 9:00 p.m., ESPN	No. 6	at Ole Miss	W 75–59	26–3 (14–1)	22 – Feagin	13 – Kitts	10 – Kitts	SJB Pavilion (5,064); Oxford, MS
March 2, 2025; 2:00 p.m., ESPN	No. 6	No. 15 Kentucky	W 78–66	27–3 (15–1)	16 – T. Johnson	10 – Kitts	6 – Paopao	Colonial Life Arena (18,000); Columbia, SC
SEC Tournament
March 7, 2025; 12:00 p.m., ESPN	(1) No. 5	vs. (8) Vanderbilt; Quarterfinals	W 84–63	28–3	25 – Kitts	10 – Kitts	5 – Paopao	Bon Secours Wellness Arena; Greenville, SC
March 8, 2025; 4:30 p.m., ESPN2	(1) No. 5	vs. (5) No. 10 Oklahoma; Semifinals	W 93–75	29–3	21 – Edwards	6 – Johnson	5 – Tied	Bon Secours Wellness Arena; Greenville, SC
March 9, 2025; 3:00 p.m., ESPN	(1) No. 5	vs. (2) No. 1 Texas; Championship	W 64–45	30–3	15 – Kitts	9 – Kitts	4 – R. Johnson	Bon Secours Wellness Arena (13,532); Greenville, SC
NCAA Tournament
March 21, 2025*; 4:00 p.m., ESPN	(1 B2) No. 2	(16 B2) Tennessee Tech; First round	W 108–48	31–3	22 – Edwards	6 – Kitts	6 – T. Johnson	Colonial Life Arena (11,683); Columbia, SC
March 23, 2025*; 3:00 p.m., ABC	(1 B2) No. 2	(9 B2) Indiana; Second round	W 64–53	32–3	11 – Hall	11 – Kitts	3 – Kitts	Colonial Life Arena (12,322); Columbia, SC
March 28, 2025*; 5:00 p.m., ESPN	(1 B2) No. 2	vs. (4 B2) No. 18 Maryland; Sweet Sixteen	W 71–67	33–3	23 – Fulwiley	11 – Kitts	5 – Paopao	Legacy Arena (11,055); Birmingham, AL
March 30, 2025*; 1:00 p.m., ABC	(1 B2) No. 2	vs. (2 B2) No. 7 Duke; Elite Eight	W 54–50	34–3	14 – Kitts	8 – Feagin	3 – Feagin	Legacy Arena (11,252); Birmingham, AL
April 4, 2025*; 7:00 p.m., ESPN	(1 B2) No. 2	vs. (1 B3) No. 5 Texas; Final Four	W 74–57	35–3	14 – Paopao	11 – Edwards	6 – Edwards	Amalie Arena (19,731); Tampa, FL
April 6, 2025*; 3:00 p.m., ABC	(1 B2) No. 2	vs. (2 S4) No. 3 UConn; National Championship	L 59–82	35–4	10 – Tied	7 – R. Johnson	4 – Fulwiley	Amalie Arena (19,777); Tampa, FL
*Non-conference game. ^{#}Rankings from AP Poll. (#) Tournament seedings in parentheses. B2=Birmingham 2. B3=Birmingham 3. S4=Spokane 4. All times are in Eastern Time. Source:

== Rankings ==
Ranking movements Legend: ██ Increase in ranking ██ Decrease in ranking ( ) = First-place votes
	Week																				
Poll	Pre	1	2	3	4	5	6	7	8	9	10	11	12	13	14	15	16	17	18	19	Final
AP	1 (27)	1 (31)	1 (31)	4	3	3	2 (1)	2 (1)	2 (1)	2	2	2 (1)	2 (1)	2	4	6	6	5	2 (9)	2 (8)	
Coaches	1 (27)	1 (29)	1 (28)	5	4	3	2	2 (1)	2	2	2	2 (2)	2 (1)	2 (2)	4	6	6	5 (1)	2 (8)	2 (7)	
