= 2024–25 Tennessee Lady Volunteers basketball team =

Intercollegiate basketball season

2024–25 Tennessee Lady Volunteers basketball
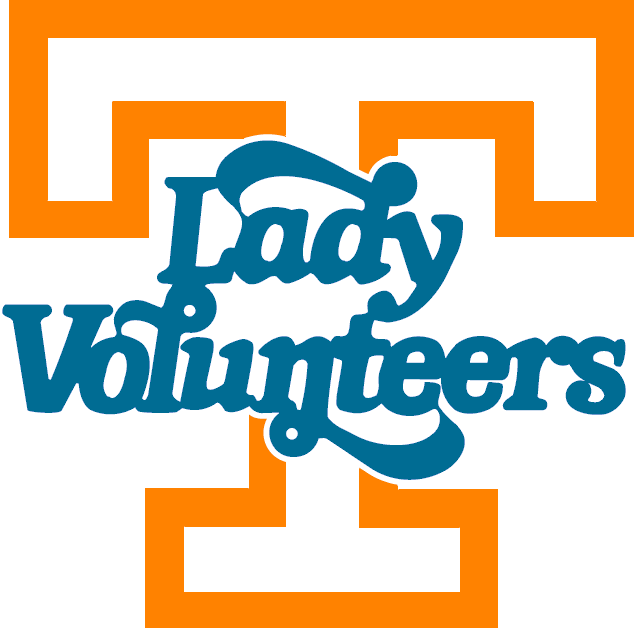

NCAA tournament, Sweet Sixteen
- Conference: Southeastern Conference

Ranking
- Coaches: No. 20
- AP: No. 20
- Record: 24–10 (8–8 SEC)
- Head coach: Kim Caldwell (1st season)
- Assistant coaches: Roman Tubner; Gabe Lazo; Jenna Burdette
- Home arena: Thompson–Boling Arena

2024–25 SEC women's basketball standings
	Conf.				Overall
Team	W		L	PCT	W		L	PCT
No. 2 South Carolina †	15	–	1	.938	35	–	4	.897
No. 5 Texas	15	–	1	.938	35	–	4	.897
No. 10 LSU	12	–	4	.750	31	–	6	.838
No. 13 Kentucky	11	–	5	.688	23	–	8	.742
No. 11 Oklahoma	11	–	5	.688	27	–	8	.771
No. 21 Alabama	10	–	6	.625	24	–	9	.727
No. 25 Ole Miss	10	–	6	.625	22	–	11	.667
Vanderbilt	8	–	8	.500	22	–	11	.667
No. 20 Tennessee	8	–	8	.500	24	–	10	.706
Mississippi State	7	–	9	.438	22	–	12	.647
Florida	5	–	11	.313	19	–	18	.514
Georgia	4	–	12	.250	13	–	19	.406
Arkansas	3	–	13	.188	10	–	22	.313
Auburn	3	–	13	.188	12	–	18	.400
Missouri	3	–	13	.188	14	–	18	.438
Texas A&M	3	–	13	.188	10	–	19	.345
† 2025 SEC tournament winner Rankings from AP poll

The 2024–25 Tennessee Lady Volunteers basketball team represented the University of Tennessee in the 2024–25 college basketball season. Led by head coach Kim Caldwell in her first year, the team played their games at Thompson–Boling Arena as members of the Southeastern Conference.

On December 14, the 19th-ranked Lady Vols set an NCAA record for the most three-point field goals made in a game. The team was 30-for-63 in three-pointers, becoming the first NCAA team, men's or women's, to reach that mark. The Lady Vols won the game against North Carolina Central University, 139–59.

Coach Caldwell had to miss coaching the Texas game, following her giving birth to her son, three days prior, on January 20. Assistant coach Jenna Burdette led the team for the game. Caldwell returned courtside to coach the South Carolina game on January 27.

The Lady Vols finished the season with a 24–10 overall record, 8–8 in the conference. In the postseason, they lost in the second round of the SEC tournament to in-state rival Vanderbilt. They earned an at-large bid to the NCAA tournament, advancing to the Sweet Sixteen before losing to SEC foe Texas.

== Previous season ==
The 2023–24 team finished the season with a 20–13 overall record, 10–6 in the conference. They received a bye in the SEC tournament and advanced to the semifinals, where they lost by one point to South Carolina. The Lady Vols earned an at-large bid to the NCAA tournament, advancing to the second round before losing to North Carolina State. In April 2024, head coach Kellie Harper was fired after five seasons.

== Offseason ==
=== Departures ===
Departures
Name	Number	Pos.	Height	Year	Hometown	Reason for departure
Rickea Jackson	2	F	6'2"	Senior	Detroit, MI	Graduated/2024 WNBA draft; selected 4th overall by Los Angeles Sparks
Karoline Striplin	11	F	6'3"	Junior	Hartford, AL	Transferred to Indiana
Jasmine Powell	15	G	5'6"	Senior	Detroit, MI	Graduated
Tamari Key	20	C	6'5"	RS Senior	Cary, NC	Graduated

=== Incoming transfers ===
Incoming transfers
Name	Number	Pos.	Height	Year	Hometown	Previous school
Samara Spencer	7	G	5'7"	Senior	Fort Lauderdale, FL	Arkansas
Lazaria Spearman	11	F	6'4"	Junior	Dacula, GA	Miami (FL)
Rapuluchi Ayodele	15	F	6'1"	Senior	Móstoles, Spain	Pittsburgh
Alyssa Latham	32	F	6'2"	Sophomore	Glenwood, IL	Syracuse

=== Recruiting classes ===
==== 2024 recruiting class ====
College recruiting information
Name	Hometown	School	Height	Weight	Commit date
Kaniya Boyd; G	Las Vegas, NV	Centennial High School	5 ft 9 in (1.75 m)	N/A	
Kaniya Boyd; G	Recruit ratings: ESPN: (95)				
Overall recruit ranking:
Note: In many cases, Scout, Rivals, 247Sports, On3, and ESPN may conflict in their listings of height and weight.; In these cases, the average was taken. ESPN grades are on a 100-point scale.; Sources: "2024 Player Commits". ESPN. Archived from the original on January 27, 2025.

==== 2025 recruiting class ====
College recruiting information (2025)
Name	Hometown	School	Height	Weight	Commit date
Mia Pauldo; PG	Denville, NJ	Morris Catholic High School	5 ft 5 in (1.65 m)	N/A	
Mia Pauldo; PG	Recruit ratings: 247Sports: ESPN: (97)				
Deniya Prawl; W	Toronto, ON	IMG Academy	6 ft 1 in (1.85 m)	N/A	
Deniya Prawl; W	Recruit ratings: 247Sports: ESPN: (97)				
Jaida Civil; G	Vero Beach, FL	Palm Bay Magnet High School	6 ft 0 in (1.83 m)	N/A	
Jaida Civil; G	Recruit ratings: 247Sports: ESPN: (95)				
Lauren Hurst; W	Cleveland, TN	Cleveland High School	6 ft 2 in (1.88 m)	N/A	
Lauren Hurst; W	Recruit ratings: 247Sports: ESPN: (94)				
Mya Pauldo; PG	Denville, NJ	Morris Catholic High School	5 ft 5 in (1.65 m)	N/A	
Mya Pauldo; PG	Recruit ratings: 247Sports: ESPN: (94)				
Overall recruit ranking:
Note: In many cases, Scout, Rivals, 247Sports, On3, and ESPN may conflict in their listings of height and weight.; In these cases, the average was taken. ESPN grades are on a 100-point scale.; Sources: "2025 Player Commits". ESPN. Archived from the original on January 27, 2025.

== Roster ==
2024–25 Tennessee Lady Volunteers women's basketball team
Players
Coaches

Pos.	#	Name	Height	Year	Previous school	Hometown
G	0	Jewel Spear	5 ft 10 in (1.78 m)	GS	Wake Forest	The Colony, TX
G/F	1	Sara Puckett	6 ft 2 in (1.88 m)	Sr	Muscle Shoals HS	Muscle Shoals, AL
G	2	Ruby Whitehorn	5 ft 11 in (1.8 m)	Jr	Clemson	Detroit, MI
G	4	Kaniya Boyd	5 ft 9 in (1.75 m)	RS Fr	Centennial HS	Las Vegas, NV
G	5	Kaiya Wynn	6 ft 0 in (1.83 m)	Sr	Foster HS	Richmond, TX
G	7	Samara Spencer	5 ft 7 in (1.7 m)	Sr	Arkansas	Fort Lauderdale, FL
G	10	Destinee Wells	5 ft 6 in (1.68 m)	RS Sr	Belmont	Lakeland, TN
F	11	Zee Spearman	6 ft 4 in (1.93 m)	Jr	Miami (FL)	Dacula, GA
G	12	Edie Darby	5 ft 7 in (1.7 m)	Jr	Greenfield HS	Greenfield, TN
G/F	13	Avery Strickland	5 ft 10 in (1.78 m)	Jr	Pittsburgh	Knoxville, TN
F	15	Fayor Ayodele	6 ft 1 in (1.85 m)	GS	Pittsburgh	Móstoles, Spain
G/F	21	Tess Darby	6 ft 1 in (1.85 m)	GS	Greenfield HS	Greenfield, TN
F	33	Alyssa Latham	6 ft 3 in (1.91 m)	So	Syracuse	Glenwood, IL
F	53	Jillian Hollingshead	6 ft 5 in (1.96 m)	Sr	Georgia	Gainesville, GA
G	55	Talaysia Cooper	6 ft 0 in (1.83 m)	RS So	South Carolina	Turbeville, SC

Head coach

- Kim Caldwell (Glenville State)

Assistant coach(es)

- Roman Tubner (Centenary)
- Gabe Lazo (Barry)
- Jenna Burdette (Dayton)

Legend

- (C) Team captain
- (S) Suspended
- (I) Ineligible
- (W) Walk-on
- Injured
- Current redshirt

Roster
Last update: December 27, 2024

== Schedule and results ==
Date time, TV	Rank^{#}	Opponent^{#}	Result	Record	High points	High rebounds	High assists	Site (attendance) city, state
Exhibition
October 31, 2024*; 6:30 p.m., SECN+/ESPN+		Carson–Newman	W 135–49		29 – Whitehorn	7 – Boyd	8 – Spencer	Thompson–Boling Arena (9,613); Knoxville, TN
Regular season
November 5, 2024*; 6:30 p.m., SECN+/ESPN+		Samford	W 101–53	1–0	25 – Spearman	6 – Tied	5 – Tied	Thompson–Boling Arena (9,515); Knoxville, TN
November 7, 2024*; 6:30 p.m., SECN+/ESPN+		UT Martin	W 90–50	2–0	18 – Whitehorn	14 – Whitehorn	5 – Spencer	Thompson–Boling Arena (9,788); Knoxville, TN
November 12, 2024*; 6:30 p.m., SECN+/ESPN+		Middle Tennessee	W 89–75	3–0	18 – Cooper	10 – Cooper	5 – Spencer	Thompson–Boling Arena (9,697); Knoxville, TN
November 16, 2024*; 12:00 p.m., SECN+/ESPN+		Liberty	W 109–93	4–0	33 – Cooper	9 – Cooper	6 – Spencer	Thompson–Boling Arena (9,109); Knoxville, TN
November 26, 2024*; 7:00 p.m., SECN		Western Carolina	W 102–50	5–0	20 – Cooper	7 – Whitehorn	5 – Spencer	Thompson–Boling Arena (9,086); Knoxville, TN
December 4, 2024*; 7:15 p.m., SECN		Florida State; ACC–SEC Challenge	W 79–77	6–0	22 – Cooper	7 – Cooper	4 – Spencer	Thompson-Boling Arena (9,529); Knoxville, TN
December 7, 2024*; 7:00 p.m., FOX		vs. No. 17 Iowa; Shark Beauty Women's Champions Classic	W 78–68	7–0	23 – Cooper	6 – Tied	3 – Cooper	Barclays Center (9,114); Brooklyn, NY
December 14, 2024*; 2:00 p.m., SECN+/ESPN+	No. 19	North Carolina Central	W 139–59	8–0	33 – Spencer	6 – Cooper	10 – Spencer	Thompson–Boling Arena (9,305); Knoxville, TN
December 18, 2024*; 8:30 p.m., ESPN+	No. 18	at Memphis	W 90–75	9–0	18 – Tied	12 – Spearman	6 – Tied	FedExForum (3,019); Memphis, TN
December 20, 2024*; 2:15 p.m., BallerTV	No. 18	vs. Richmond; West Palm Beach Classic	W 92–67	10–0	24 – Cooper	9 – Spearman	6 – Spencer	Massimino Court (373); West Palm Beach, FL
December 21, 2024*; 11:00 a.m., BallerTV	No. 18	vs. Tulsa; West Palm Beach Classic	W 102–61	11–0	17 – Puckett	9 – Spearman	6 – Spencer	Massimino Court (274); West Palm Beach, FL
December 29, 2024*; 2:00 p.m., SECN+/ESPN+	No. 15	Winthrop	W 114–50	12–0	17 – Puckett	8 – Puckett	4 – Tied	Thompson–Boling Arena (11,152); Knoxville, TN
January 2, 2025; 8:00 p.m., SECN+/ESPN+	No. 15	at Texas A&M	W 91–78	13–0 (1–0)	20 – Spear	6 – Spearman	8 – Spencer	Reed Arena (3,070); College Station, TX
January 5, 2025; 3:00 p.m., ESPN	No. 15	No. 9 Oklahoma	L 86–87	13–1 (1–1)	28 – Spear	7 – Cooper	5 – Spencer	Thompson–Boling Arena (11,321); Knoxville, TN
January 9, 2025; 6:30 p.m., SECN+/ESPN+	No. 16	No. 6 LSU	L 87–89	13–2 (1–2)	25 – Spear	6 – Tied	5 – Tied	Thompson–Boling Arena (10,220); Knoxville, TN
January 12, 2025; 1:00 p.m., SECN	No. 16	at Arkansas	W 93–63	14–2 (2–2)	20 – Cooper	9 – Puckett	8 – Spencer	Bud Walton Arena (3,072); Fayetteville, AR
January 16, 2025; 7:00 p.m., SECN	No. 15	Mississippi State	W 86–73	15–2 (3–2)	20 – Whitehorn	10 – Cooper	7 – Cooper	Thompson–Boling Arena (9,018); Knoxville, TN
January 19, 2025; 3:00 p.m., SECN+/ESPN+	No. 15	at Vanderbilt; Rivalry	L 70–71	15–3 (3–3)	22 – Cooper	11 – Spearman	6 – Spencer	Memorial Gymnasium (8,299); Nashville, TN
January 23, 2025; 8:00 p.m., SECN	No. 17	at No. 7 Texas	L 76–80	15–4 (3–4)	21 – Whitehorn	7 – Cooper	6 – Spencer	Moody Center (7,530); Austin, TX
January 27, 2025; 7:00 p.m., ESPN2	No. 18	No. 2 South Carolina	L 63–70	15–5 (3–5)	12 – Whitehorn	9 – Spearman	6 – Spencer	Thompson–Boling Arena (12,033); Knoxville, TN
February 2, 2025; 3:00 p.m., SECN+/ESPN+	No. 18	at Missouri	W 76–71	16–5 (4–5)	27 – Cooper	7 – Tied	4 – Cooper	Mizzou Arena (4,613); Columbia, MO
February 6, 2025*; 6:30 p.m., ESPN	No. 19	No. 5 UConn; Rivalry	W 80–76	17–5	16 – Spearman	8 – Cooper	4 – Cooper	Thompson–Boling Arena (16,215); Knoxville, TN
February 9, 2025; 4:00 p.m., ESPN	No. 19	at No. 6 LSU	L 77–82	17–6 (4–6)	21 – Whitehorn	7 – Cooper	5 – Spencer	Pete Maravich Assembly Center (11,154); Baton Rouge, LA
February 13, 2025; 6:30 p.m., SECN+/ESPN+	No. 15	Auburn	W 99–61	18–6 (5–6)	17 – Spear	6 – Spearman	4 – Tied	Thompson–Boling Arena (9,817); Knoxville, TN
February 16, 2025; 12:00 p.m., SECN	No. 15	Ole Miss	W 80–71	19–6 (6–6)	28 – Spear	10 – Spencer	6 – Tied	Thompson–Boling Arena (12,402); Knoxville, TN
February 20, 2025; 6:30 p.m., SECN+/ESPN+	No. 15	No. 18 Alabama	W 88–80	20–6 (7–6)	20 – Spear	9 – Spearman	4 – Tied	Thompson–Boling Arena (10,684); Knoxville, TN
February 23, 2025; 1:00 p.m., SECN	No. 15	at Florida	W 86–78	21–6 (8–6)	18 – Cooper	11 – Spencer	3 – Spear	O'Connell Center (2,287); Gainesville, FL
February 27, 2025; 7:00 p.m., SECN	No. 11	at No. 15 Kentucky; Rivalry	L 58–82	21–7 (8–7)	25 – Cooper	7 – Latham	3 – Tied	Memorial Coliseum (5,951); Lexington, KY
March 2, 2025; 12:00 p.m., SECN	No. 11	Georgia	L 69–72	21–8 (8–8)	20 – Spear	5 – Tied	4 – Tied	Thompson–Boling Arena (12,111); Knoxville, TN
SEC tournament
March 5, 2025; 11:00 a.m., SECN	(9) No. 18	vs. (16) Texas A&M; First Round	W 77–37	22–8	19 – Cooper	8 – Cooper	3 – Cooper	Bon Secours Wellness Arena; Greenville, SC
March 6, 2025; 11:00 a.m., SECN	(9) No. 18	vs. (8) Vanderbilt; Second Round/Rivalry	L 76–84	22–9	14 – Whitehorn	10 – Spearman	3 – Tied	Bon Secours Wellness Arena; Greenville, SC
NCAA tournament
March 21, 2025*; 8:00 p.m., ESPN	(5 B3) No. 20	vs. (12 B3) South Florida; First Round	W 101–66	23–9	20 – Cooper	6 – Cooper	5 – Spencer	Value City Arena (6,584); Columbus, OH
March 23, 2025*; 8:00 p.m., ESPN	(5 B3) No. 20	at (4 B3) No. 15 Ohio State; Second Round	W 82–67	24–9	19 – Cooper	8 – Cooper	6 – Spencer	Value City Arena; Columbus, OH
March 29, 2025*; 3:30 p.m., ABC	(5 B3) No. 20	vs. (1 B3) No. 5 Texas; Sweet Sixteen	L 59–67	24–10	16 – Whitehorn	7 – Spearman	2 – Tied	Legacy Arena (11,433); Birmingham, AL
*Non-conference game. ^{#}Rankings from AP Poll. (#) Tournament seedings in parentheses. B3=Birmingham. All times are in Eastern Time.

== Rankings ==
Ranking movements Legend: ██ Increase in ranking ██ Decrease in ranking RV = Received votes
	Week																				
Poll	Pre	1	2	3	4	5	6	7	8	9	10	11	12	13	14	15	16	17	18	19	Final
AP	RV	RV	RV	RV	RV	19	18	15	15	16	15	17	18	19	15	15	11	18	20	20	
Coaches	RV	RV	RV	RV	RV	18	16	13	13	15	15	17	19	17	16	13	11	17	19	20	
