= 2024–25 Missouri Tigers women's basketball team =

Intercollegiate basketball season

2024–25 Missouri Tigers women's basketball
- Conference: Southeastern Conference
- Record: 14–18 (3–13 SEC)
- Head coach: Robin Pingeton (15th season)
- Assistant coaches: Preston Beverly; Chris Bracey; Julia Ford; Jasmine James; McGhee Mann
- Home arena: Mizzou Arena

2024–25 SEC women's basketball standings
	Conf.				Overall
Team	W		L	PCT	W		L	PCT
No. 2 South Carolina †	15	–	1	.938	35	–	4	.897
No. 5 Texas	15	–	1	.938	35	–	4	.897
No. 10 LSU	12	–	4	.750	31	–	6	.838
No. 13 Kentucky	11	–	5	.688	23	–	8	.742
No. 11 Oklahoma	11	–	5	.688	27	–	8	.771
No. 21 Alabama	10	–	6	.625	24	–	9	.727
No. 25 Ole Miss	10	–	6	.625	22	–	11	.667
Vanderbilt	8	–	8	.500	22	–	11	.667
No. 20 Tennessee	8	–	8	.500	24	–	10	.706
Mississippi State	7	–	9	.438	22	–	12	.647
Florida	5	–	11	.313	19	–	18	.514
Georgia	4	–	12	.250	13	–	19	.406
Arkansas	3	–	13	.188	10	–	22	.313
Auburn	3	–	13	.188	12	–	18	.400
Missouri	3	–	13	.188	14	–	18	.438
Texas A&M	3	–	13	.188	10	–	19	.345
† 2025 SEC tournament winner Rankings from AP poll

The 2024–25 Missouri Tigers women's basketball team represented the University of Missouri during the 2024–25 NCAA Division I women's basketball season. The Tigers, led by fifteenth-year head coach Robin Pingeton, play their home games at Mizzou Arena and compete as members of the Southeastern Conference (SEC).

== Previous season ==
The Tigers finished the season 11–19 (2–14 SEC) to finish in last place in the SEC.

== Offseason ==
=== Departures ===
Missouri Departures
Name	Number	Pos.	Height	Year	Hometown	Notes	Ref
Mama Dembele	4	G	5'6"	Senior	Manlleu, Spain	Transferred to South Florida	
Abby Feit	14	G/F	6'1"	Graduate Student	Normal, Illinois	Graduated	
Sarah Linthacum	20	F	6'3"	Junior	Jefferson City, Missouri	Transferred to Missouri State	
Micah Linthacum	40	F	6'4"	RS Senior	Jefferson City, Missouri	Graduated	
Hayley Frank	43	F	6'1"	Graduate Student	Strafford, Missouri	Graduated	

=== 2024 recruiting class ===
College recruiting information
Name	Hometown	School	Height	Weight	Commit date
Londyn Oliphant; G	Dallas, Texas	Prestonwood Christian Academy	5 ft 6 in (1.68 m)	N/A	
Londyn Oliphant; G	Recruit ratings: No ratings found				
Ma'Riya Vincent; F	Houston, Texas	Cypress Springs HS	6 ft 0 in (1.83 m)	N/A	
Ma'Riya Vincent; F	Recruit ratings: No ratings found				
Overall recruit ranking:
Note: In many cases, Scout, Rivals, 247Sports, On3, and ESPN may conflict in their listings of height and weight.; In these cases, the average was taken. ESPN grades are on a 100-point scale.; Sources:

=== Incoming transfers ===
Missouri incoming transfers
Name	Number	Pos.	Height	Year	Hometown	Previous school
Laniah Randle	4	F	5'11"	Senior	Wichita, Kansas	Southern Illinois
Tilda Sjökvist	6	G	5'7"	Junior	Huskvarna, Sweden	Presbyterian
Nyah Wilson	8	G	5'8"	Senior	Dallas, Texas	New Mexico
Tionna Herron	11	C	6'4"	Sophomore	DeSoto, Texas	Texas

== Roster ==
2024–25 Missouri Tigers women's basketball team
Players
Coaches

Pos.	#	Name	Height	Year	Previous school	Hometown
G	0	Grace Slaughter	6 ft 2 in (1.88 m)	So	Grain Valley HS	Grain Valley, MO
G	1	De'Myla Brown	5 ft 7 in (1.7 m)	GS	North Little Rock HS; Houston	North Little Rock, AR
G	2	Londyn Oliphant	5 ft 6 in (1.68 m)	Fr	Prestonwood Christian Academy	Dallas, TX
F	4	Laniah Randle	5 ft 11 in (1.8 m)	Sr	Wichita Heights HS; Southern Illinois	Wichita, KS
F	5	Hilke Feldrappe	6 ft 3 in (1.91 m)	So	Alba Berlin	Berlin, Germany
G	6	Tilda Sjökvist	5 ft 7 in (1.7 m)	Jr	Sanda Secondary School; Presbyterian	Huskvarna, Sweden
C	7	Lucija Milkovic	6 ft 6 in (1.98 m)	So	ŽKK Šibenik	Šibenik, Croatia
G	8	Nyah Wilson	5 ft 8 in (1.73 m)	Sr	Duncanville HS; New Mexico	Dallas, TX
C	11	Tionna Herron	6 ft 4 in (1.93 m)	So	DeSoto HS; Texas	DeSoto, TX
F	12	Ma'Riya Vincent	6 ft 0 in (1.83 m)	Fr	Cypress Spring HS	Houston, TX
G	21	Averi Kroenke	5 ft 11 in (1.8 m)	RS So	Rock Bridge HS	Columbia, MO
G	23	Abbey Schreacke	6 ft 0 in (1.83 m)	So	Quincy Notre Dame HS	Quincy, IL
G	24	Ashton Judd	6 ft 1 in (1.85 m)	Jr	West Plains HS	West Plains, MO
F	30	Angelique Ngalakulondi	6 ft 2 in (1.88 m)	GS	Proctor Academy; UMass	Manchester, NH
F	34	Hannah Linthacum	6 ft 4 in (1.93 m)	So	Jefferson City HS	Jefferson City, MO

Head coach

- Robin Pingeton (St. Ambrose)

Assistant coach(es)

- Preston Beverly (VMI)
- Chris Bracey (West Texas A&M)
- Julia Ford (Bentley)
- Jasmine James (Georgia)
- McGhee Mann (South Carolina)

Legend

- (C) Team captain
- (S) Suspended
- (I) Ineligible
- (W) Walk-on
- Injured
- Current redshirt

Roster

== Schedule ==
Date time, TV	Rank^{#}	Opponent^{#}	Result	Record	High points	High rebounds	High assists	Site (attendance) city, state
Exhibition
October 29, 2024*; 6:30 pm		Truman State	W 112–62		17 – Slaughter	8 – Judd	4 – Tied	Mizzou Arena; Columbia, MO
Non-conference regular season
November 4, 2024*; 5:00 pm, ESPN+		at Vermont	L 46–62	0–1	16 – Slaughter	7 – Judd	2 – Sjkvist	Patrick Gym (1,068); Burlington, VT
November 7, 2024*; 6:30 pm, SECN+/ESPN+		Southern	W 66–51	1–1	15 – Slaughter	10 – Randle	4 – Wilson	Mizzou Arena (2,727); Columbia, MO
November 10, 2024*; 2:00 pm, SECN+/ESPN+		Norfolk State	L 54–57	1–2	15 – Schreacke	10 – Randle	3 – Judd	Mizzou Arena (2,623); Columbia, MO
November 12, 2024*; 6:00 pm, SECN		Tulane	W 60–52	2–2	22 – Slaughter	9 – Ngalakulondi	6 – Kroenke	Mizzou Arena (2,627); Columbia, MO
November 15, 2024*; 7:00 pm, ESPN+		at Western Illinois	W 75–55	3–2	26 – Schreacke	9 – Randle	7 – Kroenke	Western Hall (1,853); Macomb, IL
November 20, 2024*; 6:30 pm, SECN+/ESPN+		Saint Louis	W 112–59	4–2	19 – Schreacke	8 – Linthacum	7 – Sjökvist	Mizzou Arena (2,698); Columbia, MO
November 22, 2024*; 11:30 am, SECN+/ESPN+		Little Rock	W 78–49	5–2	19 – Tied	8 – Ngalakulondi	4 – Kroenke	Mizzou Arena (4,681); Columbia, MO
November 25, 2024*; 5:00 pm, FloHoops		vs. Syracuse; Emerald Coast Classic	L 59–82	5–3	13 – Slaughter	7 – Randle	3 – Tied	Raider Arena (300); Niceville, FL
November 26, 2024*; 5:00 pm, FloHoops		vs. Wichita State; Emerald Coast Classic	W 85–57	6–3	22 – Judd	10 – Randle	6 – Kroenke	Raider Arena (300); Niceville, FL
December 1, 2024*; 2:00 pm, SECN+/ESPN+		Jacksonville State	W 79–45	7–3	15 – Tied	10 – Randle	3 – Kroenke	Mizzou Arena (2,545); Columbia, MO
December 5, 2024*; 8:00 pm, SECN		SMU; ACC–SEC Challenge	W 68–61	8–3	17 – Slaughter	10 – Slaughter	5 – Kroenke	Mizzou Arena (2,358); Columbia, MO
December 7, 2024*; 2:00 pm, SECN+/ESPN+		Northern Illinois	W 94–55	9–3	20 – Slaughter	10 – Ngalakulondi	4 – Kroenke	Mizzou Arena; Columbia, MO
December 15, 2024*; 3:00 pm, SECN		Lipscomb	W 78–57	10–3	16 – Schreacke	6 – Judd	4 – Tied	Mizzou Arena (2,541); Columbia, MO
December 18, 2024*; 6:30 pm, SECN+/ESPN+		Oral Roberts	L 63–76	10–4	21 – Randle	6 – Randle	2 – Randle	Mizzou Arena (3,194); Columbia, MO
December 29, 2024*; 2:00 pm, SECN+/ESPN+		Jackson State	W 90–51	11–4	22 – Slaughter	10 – Ngalakulondi	4 – Tied	Mizzou Arena (2,986); Columbia, MO
SEC regular season
January 2, 2025; 6:00 pm, SECN		No. 2 South Carolina	L 52–83	11–5 (0–1)	15 – Judd	6 – Judd	3 – Judd	Mizzou Arena (5,154); Columbia, MO
January 5, 2025; 2:00 pm, SECN+/ESPN+		at No. 19 Alabama	L 49–68	11–6 (0–2)	9 – Tied	8 – Ngalakulondi	2 – Randle	Coleman Coliseum (2,550); Tuscaloosa, AL
January 9, 2025; 5:00 pm, SECN+/ESPN+		at Georgia	L 72–74	11–7 (0–3)	22 – Judd	10 – Tied	7 – Wilson	Stegeman Coliseum (2,209); Athens, GA
January 12, 2025; 2:00 pm, SECN+/ESPN+		Florida	L 67–93	11–8 (0–4)	18 – Judd	7 – Judd	6 – Ngalakulondi	Mizzou Arena (2,990); Columbia, MO
January 16, 2025; 6:00 pm, SECN+/ESPN+		at No. 13 Oklahoma	L 63–80	11–9 (0–5)	15 – Tied	9 – Randle	4 – Kroenke	Lloyd Noble Center (3,298); Norman, OK
January 19, 2025; 2:00 pm, SECN+/ESPN+		at Auburn	L 60–75	11–10 (0–6)	14 – Slaughter	6 – Judd	4 – Judd	Neville Arena (3,692); Auburn, AL
January 27, 2025; 7:00 pm, SECN		Mississippi State	W 78–77	12–10 (1–6)	31 – Slaughter	8 – Judd	4 – Kroenke	Mizzou Arena (2,514); Columbia, MO
January 30, 2025; 8:00 pm, SECN		at No. 5 Texas	L 61–70	12–11 (1–7)	22 – Randle	4 – Tied	3 – Schreacke	Moody Center (6,831); Austin, TX
February 2, 2025; 2:00 pm, SECN+/ESPN+		No. 18 Tennessee	L 71–76	12–12 (1–8)	18 – Brown	11 – Randle	8 – Kroenke	Mizzou Arena (4,613); Columbia, MO
February 6, 2025; 6:30 pm, SECN+/ESPN+		No. 6 LSU	L 60–71	12–13 (1–9)	18 – Slaughter	12 – Ngalakulondi	3 – Randle	Mizzou Arena (3,943); Columbia, MO
February 9, 2025; 3:00 pm, SECN		at Texas A&M	W 69–59	13–13 (2–9)	29 – Slaughter	8 – Judd	2 – Tied	Reed Arena (3,189); College Station, TX
February 16, 2025; 1:00 pm, SECN		No. 16 Oklahoma	L 66–82	13–14 (2–10)	13 – Judd	5 – Randle	2 – Tied	Mizzou Arena (3,518); Columbia, MO
February 20, 2025; 6:30 pm, SECN+/ESPN+		No. 14 Kentucky	L 65–73	13–15 (2–11)	21 – Randle	13 – Randle	3 – Kroenke	Mizzou Arena (2,601); Columbia, MO
February 23, 2025; 2:00 pm, SECN		at Ole Miss	L 66–68	13–16 (2–12)	18 – Slaughter	7 – Ngalakulondi	5 – Judd	SJB Pavilion (2,960); Oxford, MS
February 27, 2025; 6:30 pm, SECN+/ESPN+		at Arkansas	W 75–73	14–16 (3–12)	20 – Randle	9 – Randle	5 – Kroenke	Bud Walton Arena (3,878); Fayetteville, AR
March 2, 2025; 2:00 pm, SECN+/ESPN+		Vanderbilt	L 59–100	14–17 (3–13)	16 – Brown	5 – Tied	3 – Tied	Mizzou Arena (3,362); Columbia, MO
SEC Tournament
March 5, 2025; 5:00 pm, SECN	(15)	vs. (10) Mississippi State; First Round	L 55–75	14–18	15 – Judd	7 – Tied	3 – Kroenke	Bon Secours Wellness Arena; Greenville, SC
*Non-conference game. ^{#}Rankings from AP Poll. (#) Tournament seedings in parentheses. All times are in Central Time.

== See also ==
- 2024–25 Missouri Tigers men's basketball team
