= 2024–25 Texas A&M Aggies women's basketball team =

Intercollegiate basketball season

2024–25 Texas A&M Aggies women's basketball
- Conference: Southeastern Conference
- Record: 10–19 (3–13 SEC)
- Head coach: Joni Taylor (3rd season)
- Assistant coaches: Reagan Griffin Jr.; Rodney Hill; Robert Mosley; Nancy Mulkey; Chelsea Newton
- Home arena: Reed Arena

2024–25 SEC women's basketball standings
	Conf.				Overall
Team	W		L	PCT	W		L	PCT
No. 2 South Carolina †	15	–	1	.938	35	–	4	.897
No. 5 Texas	15	–	1	.938	35	–	4	.897
No. 10 LSU	12	–	4	.750	31	–	6	.838
No. 13 Kentucky	11	–	5	.688	23	–	8	.742
No. 11 Oklahoma	11	–	5	.688	27	–	8	.771
No. 21 Alabama	10	–	6	.625	24	–	9	.727
No. 25 Ole Miss	10	–	6	.625	22	–	11	.667
Vanderbilt	8	–	8	.500	22	–	11	.667
No. 20 Tennessee	8	–	8	.500	24	–	10	.706
Mississippi State	7	–	9	.438	22	–	12	.647
Florida	5	–	11	.313	19	–	18	.514
Georgia	4	–	12	.250	13	–	19	.406
Arkansas	3	–	13	.188	10	–	22	.313
Auburn	3	–	13	.188	12	–	18	.400
Missouri	3	–	13	.188	14	–	18	.438
Texas A&M	3	–	13	.188	10	–	19	.345
† 2025 SEC tournament winner Rankings from AP poll

The 2024–25 Texas A&M Aggies women's basketball team represented Texas A&M University during the 2024–25 NCAA Division I women's basketball season. The Aggies, led by third-year head coach Joni Taylor, played their home games at Reed Arena in College Station, Texas and competed as members of the Southeastern Conference (SEC).

== Previous season ==
The Aggies finished the 2023–24 season 19–13 (6–10 in SEC play) to finish ninth in the SEC, and received a bid to the NCAA tournament, where they lost to Nebraska in the first round.

== Offseason ==
=== Departures ===
Texas A&M departures
Name	Number	Pos.	Height	Year	Hometown	Notes	Ref
Sydney Bowles	00	G	6' 0"	Sophomore	Lithonia, GA	Transferred to Florida State	
Endyia Rogers	1	G	5' 7"	Graduate student	Dallas, TX	Graduated	
Janiah Barker	2	F	6' 4"	Sophomore	Marietta, GA	Transferred to UCLA	
Tineya Hylton	3	G	5' 7"	Junior	Toronto, ON	Transferred to Cincinnati	
Kay Kay Green	4	G	5' 6"	Senior	Chicago, IL	Transferred to Charlotte	
Maliyah Johnson	14	F	6' 3"	RS junior	Chicago, IL	Transferred to Ball State	
Kylie Marshall	22	G	5' 11"	Freshman	Mansfield, TX	Transferred to SMU	

=== 2024 recruiting class ===
College recruiting
Name	Hometown	School	Height	Weight	Commit date
Taliyah Parker; G	Grand Prairie, TX	South Grand Prairie HS	6 ft 1 in (1.85 m)	N/A	
Taliyah Parker; G	Recruit ratings: ESPN: (94)				
Overall recruit ranking:
Note: In many cases, Scout, Rivals, 247Sports, On3, and ESPN may conflict in their listings of height and weight.; In these cases, the average was taken. ESPN grades are on a 100-point scale.; Sources:

=== Incoming transfers ===
Texas A&M incoming transfers
Name	Number	Pos.	Height	Year	Hometown	Previous school
Janae Kent	20	G	6' 1"	Sophomore	Oak Forest, IL	LSU
Amirah Abdur-Rahim	23	F	6' 3"	Graduate student	Marietta, GA	SMU

== Roster ==
2024–25 Texas A&M Aggies women's basketball team
Players
Coaches

Pos.	#	Name	Height	Year	Previous school	Hometown
G	3	Erica Moon	5 ft 6 in (1.68 m)	RS Fr	St. Francis School	Atlanta, GA
G	5	Aicha Coulibaly	6 ft 0 in (1.83 m)	GS	IMG Academy; Auburn	Bamako, Mali
G	7	Kyndall Hunter	5 ft 7 in (1.7 m)	RS Jr	Cypress Creek HS; Texas	Houston, TX
F	11	Vanessa Saidu	6 ft 2 in (1.88 m)	So	Robbinsdale Cooper HS	Minneapolis, MN
F	13	Jada Malone	6 ft 3 in (1.91 m)	RS Jr	The Village School	Spring, TX
G	15	Solè Williams	5 ft 9 in (1.75 m)	So	Princeton HS; Louisville	Cincinnati, OH
G	20	Janae Kent	6 ft 1 in (1.85 m)	So	Oak Forest HS; LSU	Oak Forest, IL
G	21	Taliyah Parker	6 ft 1 in (1.85 m)	Fr	South Grand Prairie HS	Grand Prairie, TX
F	23	Amirah Abdur-Rahim	6 ft 3 in (1.91 m)	GS	St. Francis School; SMU	Marietta, GA
G	24	Sahara Jones	6 ft 0 in (1.83 m)	GS	Veterans Memorial HS	San Antonio, TX
F	32	Lauren Ware	6 ft 5 in (1.96 m)	RS Sr	Century HS; Arizona	Bismarck, ND

Head coach

- Joni Taylor (Alabama)

Assistant coach(es)

- Reagan Griffin Jr. (USC)
- Rodney Hill (Texas A&M)
- Robert Mosley (Miles)
- Nancy Mulkey (Rice)
- Chelsea Newton (Rutgers)

Legend

- (C) Team captain
- (S) Suspended
- (I) Ineligible
- (W) Walk-on
- Injured
- Current redshirt

Roster
Last update: November 23, 2024

== Schedule and results ==
Date time, TV	Rank^{#}	Opponent^{#}	Result	Record	High points	High rebounds	High assists	Site (attendance) city, state
Non-conference regular season
November 4, 2024*; 7:00 p.m., SECN+/ESPN+		Texas A&M–Corpus Christi	L 56–62	0–1	11 – Malone	10 – Jones	3 – tied	Reed Arena (2,772); College Station, TX
November 7, 2024*; 11:00 a.m., SECN+/ESPN+		UTSA	W 55–51	1–1	16 – Jones	8 – Coulibaly	4 – Ware	Reed Arena (7,507); College Station, TX
November 10, 2024*; 2:00 p.m., SECN+/ESPN+		Western Michigan	W 86–38	2–1	18 – Hunter	13 – Jones	4 – tied	Reed Arena (3,055); College Station, TX
November 15, 2024*; 6:00 p.m., ESPN+		at No. 15 West Virginia	L 62–83	2–2	21 – Coulibaly	4 – Jones	2 – Jones	WVU Coliseum (3,714); Morgantown, WV
November 17, 2024*; 2:00 p.m., SECN+/ESPN+		Northwestern State	W 75–54	3–2	24 – Malone	13 – Ware	4 – Coulibaly	Reed Arena (3,279); College Station, TX
November 23, 2024*; 8:00 p.m., FloHoops		vs. Villanova; Battle 4 Atlantis quarterfinals	L 57–65	3–3	14 – Jones	5 – tied	2 – tied	Imperial Arena (381); Nassau, Bahamas
November 24, 2024*; 8:00 p.m., FloHoops		vs. Ball State; Battle 4 Atlantis consolation 2nd round	L 62–75	3–4	24 – Coulibaly	10 – Ware	4 – Williams	Imperial Arena; Nassau, Bahamas
November 25, 2024*; 6:30 p.m., FloHoops		vs. Southern Miss; Battle 4 Atlantis 7th place game	W 79–57	4–4	26 – Malone	7 – tied	8 – Williams	Imperial Arena (155); Nassau, Bahamas
December 4, 2024*; 6:15 p.m., ESPNU		Syracuse; ACC–SEC Challenge	W 57–45	5–4	14 – Parker	9 – Coulibaly	4 – Moon	Reed Arena (3,043); College Station, TX
December 8, 2024*; 3:00 p.m., SECN		No. 13 Kansas State	L 50–89	5–5	12 – Coulibaly	8 – Jones	2 – Coulibaly	Reed Arena (3,617); College Station, TX
December 16, 2024*; 7:00 p.m., SECN+/ESPN+		Texas Southern	W 85–60	6–5	17 – Williams	18 – Ware	3 – Tied	Reed Arena (2,977); College Station, TX
December 19, 2024*; 1:00 p.m., SECN+/ESPN+		Mississippi Valley State	W 96–54	7–5	19 – Malone	13 – Malone	5 – Williams	Reed Arena (839); College Station, TX
SEC regular season
January 2, 2025; 7:00 p.m., SECN+/ESPN+		No. 15 Tennessee	L 78–91	7–6 (0–1)	20 – Coulibaly	11 – Ware	4 – Williams	Reed Arena (3,070); College Station, TX
January 5, 2025; 2:00 p.m., SECN+/ESPN+		No. 25 Ole Miss	W 60–58	8–6 (1–1)	18 – Williams	9 – Jones	3 – Moon	Reed Arena (3,729); College Station, TX
January 9, 2025; 4:00 p.m., ESPN2		at No. 2 South Carolina	L 49–90	8–7 (1–2)	10 – Williams	7 – Tied	3 – Tied	Colonial Life Arena (15,479); Columbia, SC
January 12, 2025; 4:00 p.m., SECN		at No. 10 Oklahoma	L 62–77	8–8 (1–3)	16 – Coulibaly	8 – Tied	2 – Tied	Lloyd Noble Center (5,010); Norman, OK
January 16, 2025; 7:00 p.m., SECN+/ESPN+		Georgia	W 68–63	9–8 (2–3)	14 – Coulibaly	6 – Tied	5 – Williams	Reed Arena (4,108); College Station, TX
January 23, 2025; 6:00 p.m., SECN		No. 11 Kentucky	W 61–55	10–8 (3–3)	21 – Coulibaly	10 – Jones	3 – Coulibaly	Reed Arena (3,044); College Station, TX
January 26, 2025; 3:00 p.m., SECN		at No. 5 LSU	L 51–64	10–9 (3–4)	13 – Parker	7 – Ware	3 – Williams	Pete Maravich Assembly Center (11,061); Baton Rouge, LA
January 30, 2025; 6:30 p.m., SECN+/ESPN+		at Arkansas	L 51–72	10–10 (3–5)	13 – Williams	7 – Tied	3 – Tied	Bud Walton Arena (2,558); Fayetteville, AR
February 2, 2025; 5:00 p.m., SECN		No. 5 Texas; Lone Star Showdown	L 50–70	10–11 (3–6)	12 – Tied	9 – Ware	3 – Moon	Reed Arena (4,676); College Station, TX
February 6, 2025; 6:00 p.m., SECN+/ESPN+		at Auburn	L 52–65	10–12 (3–7)	21 – Williams	10 – Jones	3 – Kent	Neville Arena (2,891); Auburn, AL
February 9, 2025; 3:00 p.m., SECN		Missouri	L 59–69	10–13 (3–8)	14 – Williams	8 – Jones	4 – Jones	Reed Arena (3,189); College Station, TX
February 17, 2025; 7:00 p.m., SECN		at No. 18 Alabama	L 49–88	10–14 (3–9)	14 – Kent	6 – Tied	4 – Williams	Coleman Coliseum (2,434); Tuscaloosa, AL
February 20, 2025; 3:00 p.m., SECN+/ESPN+		Florida	L 52–74	10–15 (3–10)	13 – Williams	7 – Malone	3 – Williams	Reed Arena (3,116); College Station, TX
February 23, 2025; 2:00 p.m., SECN+/ESPN+		at Mississippi State	L 55–81	10–16 (3–11)	19 – Ware	6 – Tied	3 – Tied	Humphrey Coliseum (4,696); Starkville, MS
February 27, 2025; 6:30 p.m., SECN+/ESPN+		at Vanderbilt	L 58–91	10–17 (3–12)	16 – Ware	9 – Ware	3 – Tied	Memorial Gymnasium (4,411); Nashville, TN
March 2, 2025; 2:00 p.m., SECN+/ESPN+		Arkansas	L 71–80	10–18 (3–13)	21 – Jones	11 – Tied	4 – Moon	Reed Arena (3,636); College Station, TX
SEC tournament
March 5, 2025; 10:00 am, SECN	(16)	vs. (9) No. 18 Tennessee; First Round	L 37–77	10–19	16 – Jones	13 – Jones	3 – Williams	Bon Secours Wellness Arena; Greenville, SC
*Non-conference game. ^{#}Rankings from AP poll. (#) Tournament seedings in parentheses. All times are in Central.

== See also ==
- 2024–25 Texas A&M Aggies men's basketball team
