= 2024–25 Auburn Tigers women's basketball team =

Intercollegiate basketball season

2024–25 Auburn Tigers women's basketball
- Conference: Southeastern Conference
- Record: 12–18 (3–13 SEC)
- Head coach: Johnnie Harris (4th season)
- Assistant coaches: Fred Williams; Damitria Buchanan; Savannah Carter; Ketara Chapel; Alex Stewart
- Home arena: Neville Arena

2024–25 SEC women's basketball standings
	Conf.				Overall
Team	W		L	PCT	W		L	PCT
No. 2 South Carolina †	15	–	1	.938	35	–	4	.897
No. 5 Texas	15	–	1	.938	35	–	4	.897
No. 10 LSU	12	–	4	.750	31	–	6	.838
No. 13 Kentucky	11	–	5	.688	23	–	8	.742
No. 11 Oklahoma	11	–	5	.688	27	–	8	.771
No. 21 Alabama	10	–	6	.625	24	–	9	.727
No. 25 Ole Miss	10	–	6	.625	22	–	11	.667
Vanderbilt	8	–	8	.500	22	–	11	.667
No. 20 Tennessee	8	–	8	.500	24	–	10	.706
Mississippi State	7	–	9	.438	22	–	12	.647
Florida	5	–	11	.313	19	–	18	.514
Georgia	4	–	12	.250	13	–	19	.406
Arkansas	3	–	13	.188	10	–	22	.313
Auburn	3	–	13	.188	12	–	18	.400
Missouri	3	–	13	.188	14	–	18	.438
Texas A&M	3	–	13	.188	10	–	19	.345
† 2025 SEC tournament winner Rankings from AP poll

The 2024–25 Auburn Tigers women's basketball team represented Auburn University during the 2024–25 NCAA Division I women's basketball season. The Tigers, led by fourth-year head coach Johnnie Harris, play their home games at Neville Arena and compete as members of the Southeastern Conference (SEC).

== Previous season ==
The Tigers finished the season 20–12 (8–8 SEC) to finish in a tie for seventh in the SEC and received a bid to the NCAA tournament, where they lost to Arizona in the First Four.

== Offseason ==
=== Departures ===
Auburn Departures
Name	Number	Pos.	Height	Year	Hometown	Notes	Ref
JaMya Mingo-Young	2	G	5'8"	Graduate Student	Bogalusa, Louisiana	Graduated	
McKenna Eddings	3	G	6'0"	Junior	Williamsburg, Virginia	Transferred to Georgia Southern	
Sydney Shaw	5	G	5'9"	Sophomore	Miami, Florida	Transferred to West Virginia	
Kionna Gaines	15	G	5'9"	Junior	Columbus, Georgia	Transferred to Kennesaw State	
Honesty Scott-Grayson	23	G	5'9"	Graduate Student	Brick, New Jersey	Graduated	
Carsen McFadden	24	G	5'8"	Senior	Fairview, Texas	Graduated	

=== 2024 recruiting class ===
College recruiting information
Name	Hometown	School	Height	Weight	Commit date
Jordan Hunter; G	Trussville, Alabama	Hewitt-Trussville HS	5 ft 8 in (1.73 m)	N/A	
Jordan Hunter; G	Recruit ratings: No ratings found				
Syriah Daniels; F/G	Auburn, Alabama	Auburn HS	6 ft 0 in (1.83 m)	N/A	
Syriah Daniels; F/G	Recruit ratings: No ratings found				
Yuting Deng; G	Hunan, China	FIBA China	6 ft 0 in (1.83 m)	N/A	
Yuting Deng; G	Recruit ratings: No ratings found				
Overall recruit ranking:
Note: In many cases, Scout, Rivals, 247Sports, On3, and ESPN may conflict in their listings of height and weight.; In these cases, the average was taken. ESPN grades are on a 100-point scale.; Sources:

=== Incoming transfers ===
Auburn incoming transfers
Name	Number	Pos.	Height	Year	Hometown	Previous school
Taliah Scott	0	G	5'9"	Sophomore	Orange Park, Florida	Arkansas
DeYona Gaston	5	F	6'2"	Graduate Student	Pearland, Texas	Texas

== Roster ==
2024–25 Auburn Tigers women's basketball team
Players
Coaches

Pos.	#	Name	Height	Year	Previous school	Hometown
G	0	Taliah Scott	5 ft 9 in (1.75 m)	So	St. Johns Country Day School; Arkansas	Orange Park, FL
F	1	Celia Sumbane	6 ft 2 in (1.88 m)	Sr	Quinta dos Lombos; South Plains College	Maputo, Mozambique
G	2	Jordan Hunter	5 ft 8 in (1.73 m)	Fr	Hewitt-Trussville HS	Trussville, AL
G	4	Kaitlyn Duhon	5 ft 10 in (1.78 m)	Jr	Summer Creek HS	Houston, TX
F	5	DeYona Gaston	6 ft 2 in (1.88 m)	GS	Pearland HS; Texas	Pearland, TX
F	7	Yakiya Milton	6 ft 4 in (1.93 m)	So	Mandarin HS	Jacksonville, FL
G	9	Yuting Deng	6 ft 0 in (1.83 m)	Fr	FIBA China	Hunan, China
G/F	11	Syriah Daniels	6 ft 0 in (1.83 m)	Fr	Auburn HS	Auburn, AL
G	12	Mar'shaun Bostic	5 ft 8 in (1.73 m)	Sr	Vashon HS	St. Louis, MO
F	14	Taylen Collins	6 ft 1 in (1.85 m)	GS	Muldrow HS; Oklahoma State	Muldrow, OK
C	20	Oyindamola Akinbolawa	6 ft 5 in (1.96 m)	Jr	Zenith League	Lagos, Nigeria
G	21	Audia Young	5 ft 9 in (1.75 m)	RS So	FSU School	Tallahassee, FL
C	30	Savannah Scott	6 ft 4 in (1.93 m)	So	Conway HS	Conway, AR
C	32	Timya Thurman	6 ft 5 in (1.96 m)	So	Linden HS	Linden, AL

Head coach

- Johnnie Harris (Arkansas Baptist)

Assistant coach(es)

- Fred Williams (Boise State)
- Damitria Buchanan (Texas A&M)
- Savannah Carter (Mississippi State)
- Ketara Chapel (Mississippi State)
- Alex Stewart (Georgia Tech)

Legend

- (C) Team captain
- (S) Suspended
- (I) Ineligible
- (W) Walk-on
- Injured
- Current redshirt

Roster

== Schedule ==
Date time, TV	Rank^{#}	Opponent^{#}	Result	Record	High points	High rebounds	High assists	Site (attendance) city, state
Exhibition
October 31, 2024*; 6:00 pm		LaGrange	W 106–26		32 – Gaston	14 – Tied	13 – Bostic	Neville Arena; Auburn, AL
Non-conference regular season
November 4, 2024*; 6:00 pm, SECN+/ESPN+		Southern Illinois	W 65–31	1–0	14 – Gaston	10 – Collins	6 – Hunter	Neville Arena (2,564); Auburn, AL
November 8, 2024*; 6:00 pm, SECN+/ESPN+		Virginia–Lynchburg	W 128–36	2–0	36 – Gaston	11 – Gaston	6 – Tied	Neville Arena (2,670); Auburn, AL
November 14, 2024*; 7:00 pm, SECN		Little Rock	W 82–48	3–0	26 – T. Scott	14 – Gaston	7 – Bostic	Neville Arena (2,682); Auburn, AL
November 20, 2024*; 6:00 pm, B1G+		at No. 23 Oregon	L 68–70	3–1	28 – T. Scott	6 – Tied	5 – Bostic	Matthew Knight Arena (5,067); Eugene, OR
November 22, 2024*; 8:00 pm, ACCNX/ESPN+		at California	L 59–63	3–2	16 – Gaston	8 – Sumbane	3 – Bostic	Haas Pavilion; Berkeley, CA
November 28, 2024*; 2:00 pm, ESPN+		vs. Northern Iowa; Paradise Jam	W 65–64	4–2	18 – Gaston	10 – Akinbolawa	7 – Bostic	Sports and Fitness Center; Saint Thomas, USVI
November 29, 2024*; 11:30 am, ESPN+		vs. Pittsburgh; Paradise Jam	W 82–50	5–2	28 – Gaston	10 – Tied	4 – Gaston	Sports and Fitness Center; Saint Thomas, USVI
November 30, 2024*; 2:00 pm, ESPN+		vs. Kansas; Paradise Jam	L 60–61	5–3	16 – Sumbane	15 – Gaston	7 – Bostic	Sports and Fitness Center; Saint Thomas, USVI
December 5, 2024*; 5:00 pm, ACCN		at Virginia; ACC–SEC Challenge	W 66–57	6–3	23 – Gaston	7 – Collins	7 – Bostic	John Paul Jones Arena (3,994); Charlottesville, VA
December 8, 2024*; 2:00 pm, SECN+/ESPN+		UAB	W 69–62	7–3	15 – Collins	10 – Collins	6 – Bostic	Neville Arena (4,008); Auburn, AL
December 18, 2024*; 11:00 am, ESPN+		at Louisiana	W 68–51	8–3	29 – Gaston	10 – Gaston	5 – Bostic	Cajundome (5,877); Lafayette, LA
December 21, 2024*; 12:00 pm, SECN+/ESPN+		Alabama State	W 83–40	9–3	35 – Gaston	7 – Gaston	6 – Sumbane	Neville Arena (3,076); Auburn, AL
December 29, 2024*; 2:00 pm, SECN+/ESPN+		Norfolk State	L 57–63	9–4	29 – Gaston	12 – Gaston	8 – Bostic	Neville Arena (3,012); Auburn, AL
SEC regular season
January 2, 2025; 6:00 pm, SECN+/ESPN+		No. 25 Ole Miss	L 58–85	9–5 (0–1)	30 – Gaston	6 – Gaston	3 – Collins	Neville Arena (2,955); Auburn, AL
January 5, 2025; 3:00 pm, SECN		at No. 6 LSU	L 63–73	9–6 (0–2)	16 – Gaston	6 – Sumbane	2 – Sumbane	Pete Maravich Assembly Center (11,302); Baton Rouge, LA
January 9, 2025; 6:00 pm, SECN+/ESPN+		Arkansas	L 58–59	9–7 (0–3)	16 – Gaston	9 – Gaston	5 – Bostic	Neville Arena (2,791); Auburn, AL
January 12, 2025; 2:00 pm, SECN		at No. 15 Kentucky	L 61–80	9–8 (0–4)	23 – Gaston	8 – Sumbane	6 – Bostic	Memorial Coliseum (4,579); Lexington, KY
January 16, 2025; 6:00 pm, SECN+/ESPN+		No. 7 Texas	L 57–74	9–9 (0–5)	18 – Tied	8 – Akinbolawa	6 – Bostic	Neville Arena (3,151); Auburn, AL
January 19, 2025; 2:00 pm, SECN+/ESPN+		Missouri	W 75–60	10–9 (1–5)	13 – Tied	11 – Sumbane	4 – Collins	Neville Arena (3,692); Auburn, AL
January 23, 2025; 6:30 pm, SECN+/ESPN+		at Mississippi State	L 56–96	10–10 (1–6)	26 – Gaston	6 – Gaston	5 – Bostic	Humphrey Coliseum (4,652); Starkville, MS
January 26, 2025; 2:00 pm, SECN+/ESPN+		Florida	W 74–51	11–10 (2–6)	18 – Gaston	12 – Collins	11 – Bostic	Neville Arena (3,946); Auburn, AL
February 2, 2025; 11:00 am, SECN		at No. 2 South Carolina	L 66–83	11–11 (2–7)	31 – Gaston	5 – Tied	9 – Bostic	Colonial Life Arena (18,000); Columbia, SC
February 6, 2025; 6:00 pm, SECN+/ESPN+		Texas A&M	W 65–52	12–11 (3–7)	18 – Gaston	6 – Tied	10 – Bostic	Neville Arena (2,891); Auburn, AL
February 10, 2025; 7:00 pm, SECN		at No. 16 Oklahoma	L 71–73	12–12 (3–8)	24 – Gaston	7 – Milton	5 – Bostic	Lloyd Noble Center (3,048); Norman, OK
February 13, 2025; 5:30 pm, SECN		at No. 15 Tennessee	L 61–99	12–13 (3–9)	24 – Gaston	12 – Gaston	8 – Bostic	Thompson–Boling Arena (9,817); Knoxville, TN
February 16, 2025; 3:00 pm, SECN		Vanderbilt	L 88–98 ^{OT}	12–14 (3–10)	27 – Deng	9 – Deng	11 – Bostic	Neville Arena (4,353); Auburn, AL
February 23, 2025; 4:00 pm, SECN		at No. 18 Alabama	L 50–66	12–15 (3–11)	19 – Gaston	13 – Gaston	5 – Bostic	Coleman Coliseum (4,340); Tuscaloosa, AL
February 27, 2025; 5:00 pm, SECN+/ESPN+		at Georgia	L 59–62	12–16 (3–12)	26 – Gaston	6 – Gaston	8 – Bostic	Stegeman Coliseum (2,470); Athens, GA
March 2, 2025; 2:00 pm, SECN+/ESPN+		Mississippi State	L 66–73	12–17 (3–13)	33 – Gaston	10 – Bostic	8 – Bostic	Neville Arena (3,317); Auburn, AL
SEC Tournament
March 5, 2025; 7:30 pm, SECN	(14)	vs. (11) Florida; First Round	L 50–60	12–18	16 – Gaston	11 – Gaston	4 – Bostic	Bon Secours Wellness Arena (4,953); Greenville, SC
*Non-conference game. ^{#}Rankings from AP Poll. (#) Tournament seedings in parentheses. All times are in Central Time.

== See also ==
- 2024–25 Auburn Tigers men's basketball team
