= 2024–25 Florida Gators women's basketball team =

Intercollegiate basketball season

2024–25 Florida Gators women's basketball

WBIT, Semifinals
- Conference: Southeastern Conference
- Record: 19–18 (5–11 SEC)
- Head coach: Kelly Rae Finley (4th season)
- Assistant coaches: Daniel Boice; Susie Gardner; Rhyne Howard; Cynthia Jordan; Jackie Moore
- Home arena: O'Connell Center

2024–25 SEC women's basketball standings
	Conf.				Overall
Team	W		L	PCT	W		L	PCT
No. 2 South Carolina †	15	–	1	.938	35	–	4	.897
No. 5 Texas	15	–	1	.938	35	–	4	.897
No. 10 LSU	12	–	4	.750	31	–	6	.838
No. 13 Kentucky	11	–	5	.688	23	–	8	.742
No. 11 Oklahoma	11	–	5	.688	27	–	8	.771
No. 21 Alabama	10	–	6	.625	24	–	9	.727
No. 25 Ole Miss	10	–	6	.625	22	–	11	.667
Vanderbilt	8	–	8	.500	22	–	11	.667
No. 20 Tennessee	8	–	8	.500	24	–	10	.706
Mississippi State	7	–	9	.438	22	–	12	.647
Florida	5	–	11	.313	19	–	18	.514
Georgia	4	–	12	.250	13	–	19	.406
Arkansas	3	–	13	.188	10	–	22	.313
Auburn	3	–	13	.188	12	–	18	.400
Missouri	3	–	13	.188	14	–	18	.438
Texas A&M	3	–	13	.188	10	–	19	.345
† 2025 SEC tournament winner Rankings from AP poll

The 2024–25 Florida Gators women's basketball team represented the University of Florida during the 2024–25 NCAA Division I women's basketball season. The Gators, led by fourth-year head coach Kelly Rae Finley, played their home games at the O'Connell Center and compete as members of the Southeastern Conference (SEC).

== Previous season ==
The Gators finished the season 16–16 (5–11 SEC) to finish in eleventh in the SEC and received a bid to the inaugural WBIT, where they lost to St. John's in the first round.

== Offseason ==
=== Departures ===
Florida Departures
Name	Number	Pos.	Height	Year	Hometown	Notes	Ref
Aliyah Matharu	2	G	5'7"	Senior	Washington, D.C.	Transferred to Baylor	
Zippy Broughton	4	G	5'7"	Senior	Wetumpka, Alabama	Graduated	
Alberte Rimdal	5	G	5'9"	Junior	Køge, Denmark	Transferred to Nebraska	
Leilani Correa	23	G	6'0"	Senior	Manchester, New Jersey	Graduated	
Faith Dut	25	F	6'4"	Senior	Vancouver, British Columbia	Graduated	

=== 2024 recruiting class ===
College recruiting
Name	Hometown	School	Height	Weight	Commit date
Liv McGill; G	Minneapolis, Minnesota	Hopkins HS	5 ft 9 in (1.75 m)	N/A	
Liv McGill; G	Recruit ratings: ESPN: (97)				
Me'Arah O'Neal; G/F	Houston, Texas	Episcopal HS	6 ft 4 in (1.93 m)	N/A	
Me'Arah O'Neal; G/F	Recruit ratings: ESPN: (95)				
Kylee Kitts; G/F	Oviedo, Florida	Hagerty HS	6 ft 4 in (1.93 m)	N/A	
Kylee Kitts; G/F	Recruit ratings: No ratings found				
Daviane Mindoudi Ongbakahoumb; G	Bilbao, Spain	Segle XXI	6 ft 1 in (1.85 m)	N/A	
Daviane Mindoudi Ongbakahoumb; G	Recruit ratings: No ratings found				
Overall recruit ranking:
Note: In many cases, Scout, Rivals, 247Sports, On3, and ESPN may conflict in their listings of height and weight.; In these cases, the average was taken. ESPN grades are on a 100-point scale.; Sources:

=== Incoming transfer ===
Florida Incoming Transfers
Name	Number	Pos.	Height	Year	Hometown	Previous school
Alexia Gassett	3	F	6'2"	Junior	Reynoldsburg, Ohio	Louisville

== Roster ==
2024–25 Florida Gators women's basketball team
Players
Coaches

Pos.	#	Name	Height	Year	Previous school	Hometown
F	3	Alexia Gassett	6 ft 2 in (1.88 m)	Jr	Reynoldsburg HS; Louisville	Reynoldsburg, OH
G/F	5	Kylee Kitts	6 ft 4 in (1.93 m)	Fr	Hagerty HS	Oviedo, FL
G	6	Kenza Salgues	5 ft 9 in (1.75 m)	Sr	INSEP; Miami (FL)	Montpellier, France
G/F	8	Me'Arah O'Neal	6 ft 4 in (1.93 m)	Fr	Episcopal HS	Houston, TX
F	9	Alexia Dizeko	5 ft 11 in (1.8 m)	Sr	ECCG de Martigny; South Georgia Technical College	Sion, Switzerland
G	12	Daviane Mindoudi Ongbakahoumb	6 ft 1 in (1.85 m)	Fr	Segle XXI	Bilbao, Spain
G	13	Laila Reynolds	6 ft 1 in (1.85 m)	So	Shabach Christian Academy	Prince George's County, MD
G	20	Jeriah Warren	6 ft 0 in (1.83 m)	Sr	LaGrange HS	Lake Charles, LA
F	21	Eriny Kindred	6 ft 0 in (1.83 m)	Sr	Del Valle HS; Texas A&M	Del Valle, TX
F	22	Paige Clausen	6 ft 0 in (1.83 m)	Sr	Barron G. Collier HS	Naples, FL
G	23	Liv McGill	5 ft 9 in (1.75 m)	Fr	Hopkins HS	Minneapolis, MN
C	24	Ra Shaya Kyle	6 ft 6 in (1.98 m)	Sr	Marion HS; Purdue	Marion, IN

Head coach

- Kelly Rae Finley (Colorado State)

Assistant coach(es)

- Daniel Boice (Dordt)
- Susie Gardner (Georgia)
- Rhyne Howard (Kentucky)
- Cynthia Jordan (Temple)
- Jackie Moore (Armstrong State)

Legend

- (C) Team captain
- (S) Suspended
- (I) Ineligible
- (W) Walk-on
- Injured
- Current redshirt

Roster

== Schedule ==
Date time, TV	Rank^{#}	Opponent^{#}	Result	Record	High points	High rebounds	High assists	Site (attendance) city, state
Exhibition
October 30, 2024*; 7:00 pm		Flagler	W 85–46		21 – Kyle	11 – Warren	7 – Salgues	O'Connell Center (445); Gainesville, FL
Non-conference regular season
November 4, 2024*; 7:00 pm, SECN+/ESPN+		Florida Atlantic	W 82–54	1–0	21 – Warren	7 – Gassett	6 – McGill	O'Connell Center (1,288); Gainesville, FL
November 7, 2024*; 5:00 pm, SECN+/ESPN+		Florida A&M	W 102–67	2–0	21 – McGill	12 – Kyle	6 – McGill	O'Connell Center (1,343); Gainesville, FL
November 12, 2024*; 7:00 pm, SECN+/ESPN+		Chicago State	W 104–35	3–0	21 – McGill	12 – Kyle	8 – McGill	O'Connell Center (991); Gainesville, FL
November 16, 2024*; 12:00 pm, SECN+/ESPN+		Miami (FL)	L 73–83	3–1	25 – Warren	8 – Kyle	9 – McGill	O'Connell Center (1,724); Gainesville, FL
November 22, 2024*; 7:00 pm, ACCN		at Florida State	L 74–98	3–2	28 – McGill	11 – Kyle	5 – McGill	Donald L. Tucker Civic Center (2,894); Tallahassee, FL
November 28, 2024*; 1:00 pm		vs. Tulane; St. Pete Showcase	L 81–83	3–3	25 – Kyle	9 – Kyle	7 – Reynolds	McArthur Center (273); St. Petersburg, FL
November 29, 2024*; 3:00 pm		vs. James Madison; St. Pete Showcase	L 72–77	3–4	20 – McGill	6 – Tied	3 – Reynolds	McArthur Center (333); St. Petersburg, FL
December 2, 2024*; 7:00 pm, SECN+/ESPN+		Hofstra	W 75–48	4–4	15 – Kyle	11 – Kyle	5 – McGill	O'Connell Center (1,322); Gainesville, FL
December 5, 2024*; 8:00 pm, ACCN		at Clemson; ACC–SEC Challenge	W 77–64	5–4	21 – McGill	10 – Kyle	4 – Warren	Littlejohn Coliseum (1,475); Clemson, SC
December 8, 2024*; 2:00 pm, SECN+/ESPN+		Marshall	W 82–63	6–4	16 – Kyle	11 – Kyle	9 – McGill	O'Connell Center (1,732); Gainesville, FL
December 15, 2024*; 12:00 pm, SECN		Longwood	W 93–65	7–4	21 – McGill	11 – Tied	5 – McGill	O'Connell Center (1,334); Gainesville, FL
December 18, 2024*; 6:30 pm, ESPNU		vs. No. 19 North Carolina; Jumpman Invitational	L 57–77	7–5	15 – McGill	11 – Kyle	2 – Tied	Spectrum Center; Charlotte, NC
December 21, 2024*; 2:45 pm, SECN+/ESPN+		North Florida	W 75–47	8–5	18 – Kyle	10 – Gassett	5 – McGill	O'Connell Center (1,394); Gainesville, FL
December 29, 2024*; 3:45 pm, SECN+/ESPN+		Alabama State	W 88–31	9–5	16 – Kyle	11 – Kyle	9 – McGill	O'Connell Center (1,401); Gainesville, FL
SEC regular season
January 2, 2025; 7:00 pm, SECN+/ESPN+		at No. 19 Alabama	L 69–79	9–6 (0–1)	18 – McGill	13 – Kyle	2 – Tied	Coleman Coliseum (2,516); Tuscaloosa, AL
January 5, 2025; 12:00 pm, SECN		Georgia	W 73–57	10–6 (1–1)	18 – Kyle	6 – McGill	6 – McGill	O'Connell Center (1,656); Gainesville, FL
January 9, 2025; 5:00 pm, SECN		No. 15 Kentucky	L 55–71	10–7 (1–2)	15 – Reynolds	9 – O'Neal	3 – Warren	O'Connell Center (1,585); Gainesville, FL
January 12, 2025; 7:30 pm, SECN+/ESPN+		at Missouri	W 93–67	11–7 (2–2)	27 – Warren	11 – McGill	9 – McGill	Mizzou Arena (2,990); Columbia, MO
January 16, 2025; 9:00 pm, SECN		at Ole Miss	L 69–94	11–8 (2–3)	19 – Warren	6 – Kyle	5 – McGill	SJB Pavilion (2,884); Oxford, MS
January 19, 2025; 1:00 pm, SECN		No. 5 LSU	L 63–80	11–9 (2–4)	21 – McGill	7 – Tied	6 – McGill	O'Connell Center (6,568); Gainesville, FL
January 26, 2025; 3:00 pm, SECN+/ESPN+		at Auburn	L 51–74	11–10 (2–5)	11 – Tied	7 – Kyle	4 – McGill	Neville Arena (3,946); Auburn, AL
January 30, 2025; 7:00 pm, SECN+/ESPN+		No. 23 Vanderbilt	L 86–99	11–11 (2–6)	23 – Kyle	12 – Kyle	4 – McGill	O'Connell Center (1,709); Gainesville, FL
February 3, 2025; 7:00 pm, SECN		at Arkansas	W 108–78	12–11 (3–6)	18 – McGill	12 – Kyle	11 – McGill	Bud Walton Arena (2,243); Fayetteville, AR
February 6, 2025; 7:00 pm, SECN		No. 23 Alabama	L 66–84	12–12 (3–7)	22 – McGill	10 – Warren	6 – McGill	O'Connell Center (1,485); Gainesville, FL
February 13, 2025; 7:00 pm, SECN		at No. 4 South Carolina	L 63–101	12–13 (3–8)	15 – Tied	8 – Gassett	4 – McGill	Colonial Life Arena (16,708); Columbia, SC
February 16, 2025; 2:00 pm, SECN+/ESPN+		Mississippi State	W 69–66	13–13 (4–8)	20 – McGill	6 – Kyle	5 – Reynolds	O'Connell Center (2,044); Gainesville, FL
February 20, 2025; 8:00 pm, SECN+/ESPN+		at Texas A&M	W 74–52	14–13 (5–8)	18 – McGill	9 – Reynolds	6 – Reynolds	Reed Arena (3,116); College Station, TX
February 23, 2025; 1:00 pm, SECN		No. 15 Tennessee	L 78–86	14–14 (5–9)	19 – Kyle	10 – Kyle	5 – McGill	O'Connell Center (2,267); Gainesville, FL
February 27, 2025; 7:00 pm, SECN+/ESPN+		No. 13 Oklahoma	L 65–89	14–15 (5–10)	14 – McGill	8 – Kyle	3 – Tied	O'Connell Center (1,928); Gainesville, FL
March 2, 2025; 2:00 pm, SECN		at No. 1 Texas	L 46–72	14–16 (5–11)	12 – Kyle	7 – McGill	4 – McGill	Moody Center (10,580); Austin, TX
SEC Tournament
March 5, 2025; 8:30 pm, SECN	(11)	vs. (14) Auburn; First Round	W 60–50	15–16	16 – Kyle	11 – Kyle	8 – McGill	Bon Secours Wellness Arena (4,953); Greenville, SC
March 6, 2025; 8:30 pm, SECN	(11)	vs. (6) No. 19 Alabama; Second Round	W 63–61	16–16	29 – McGill	9 – O'Neal	4 – McGill	Bon Secours Wellness Arena; Greenville, SC
March 7, 2025; 8:30 pm, SECN	(11)	vs. (3) No. 9 LSU; Quarterfinals	L 87–101	16–17	16 – McGill	11 – Kyle	6 – McGill	Bon Secours Wellness Arena (8,439); Greenville, SC
WBIT
March 20, 2025*; 7:00 p.m., ESPN+	(3)	Northern Iowa; First Round	W 83–71	17–17	28 – Warren	7 – Tied	6 – McGill	O'Connell Center (405); Gainesville, FL
March 23, 2025*; 5:00 p.m., ESPN+	(3)	at (2) UNLV; Second Round	W 86–84	18–17	22 – McGill	7 – Tied	8 – McGill	Cox Pavilion (645); Las Vegas, NV
March 27, 2025*; 6:00 p.m., ESPN+	(3)	Texas Tech; Quarterfinals	W 67–63	19–17	22 – McGill	12 – Kyle	6 – McGill	O'Connell Center (501); Gainesville, FL
March 31, 2025*; 5:00 p.m., ESPNU	(3)	vs. (2) Minnesota; Semifinals	L 52–66	19–18	18 – McGill	9 – McGill	4 – Salgues	Hinkle Fieldhouse; Indianapolis, IN
*Non-conference game. ^{#}Rankings from AP Poll. (#) Tournament seedings in parentheses. All times are in Eastern Time.

== See also ==
- 2024–25 Florida Gators men's basketball team
