= 2024–25 Vanderbilt Commodores women's basketball team =

Intercollegiate basketball season

2024–25 Vanderbilt Commodores women's basketball

NCAA tournament, First round
- Conference: Southeastern Conference
- Record: 22–11 (8–8 SEC)
- Head coach: Shea Ralph (4th season)
- Assistant coaches: Kevin DeMille; Ashley Earley; Tom Garrick; Eric Mundinger
- Home arena: Memorial Gymnasium

2024–25 SEC women's basketball standings
	Conf.				Overall
Team	W		L	PCT	W		L	PCT
No. 2 South Carolina †	15	–	1	.938	35	–	4	.897
No. 5 Texas	15	–	1	.938	35	–	4	.897
No. 10 LSU	12	–	4	.750	31	–	6	.838
No. 13 Kentucky	11	–	5	.688	23	–	8	.742
No. 11 Oklahoma	11	–	5	.688	27	–	8	.771
No. 21 Alabama	10	–	6	.625	24	–	9	.727
No. 25 Ole Miss	10	–	6	.625	22	–	11	.667
Vanderbilt	8	–	8	.500	22	–	11	.667
No. 20 Tennessee	8	–	8	.500	24	–	10	.706
Mississippi State	7	–	9	.438	22	–	12	.647
Florida	5	–	11	.313	19	–	18	.514
Georgia	4	–	12	.250	13	–	19	.406
Arkansas	3	–	13	.188	10	–	22	.313
Auburn	3	–	13	.188	12	–	18	.400
Missouri	3	–	13	.188	14	–	18	.438
Texas A&M	3	–	13	.188	10	–	19	.345
† 2025 SEC tournament winner Rankings from AP poll

The 2024–25 Vanderbilt Commodores women's basketball team represented Vanderbilt University during the 2024–25 NCAA Division I women's basketball season. The Commodores, led by fourth-year head coach Shea Ralph, played their home games at Memorial Gymnasium and competed as members of the Southeastern Conference (SEC).

== Previous season ==
The Commodores finished the season 23–10 (9–7 SEC) to finish in sixth place in the SEC. They received a bid to the NCAA tournament, where they defeated Columbia in the First Four before losing to Baylor in the first round.

== Offseason ==
=== Departures ===
Vanderbilt departures
Name	Number	Pos.	Height	Year	Hometown	Reason for departure	Ref
Jordyn Cambridge	3	G	5'9"	Graduate student	Nashville, Tennessee	Graduated	
Ryanne Allen	5	G	6'1"	Sophomore	Warminster, Pennsylvania	Transferred to Villanova	
Bailey Gilmore	10	F	6'3"	Freshman	Midway, Georgia	Transferred to Memphis	
Bella LaChance	21	G	5'6"	Senior	Davie, Florida	Transferred to Furman	

=== 2024 recruiting class ===
College recruiting
Name	Hometown	School	Height	Weight	Commit date
Mikayla Blakes; G	Somerset, New Jersey	Rutgers Preparatory School	5 ft 8 in (1.73 m)	N/A	
Mikayla Blakes; G	Recruit ratings: ESPN: (98)				
Trinity Wilson; F	Lakeville, Minnesota	Lakeville North HS	6 ft 3 in (1.91 m)	N/A	
Trinity Wilson; F	Recruit ratings: No ratings found				
Overall recruit ranking:
Note: In many cases, Scout, Rivals, 247Sports, On3, and ESPN may conflict in their listings of height and weight.; In these cases, the average was taken. ESPN grades are on a 100-point scale.; Sources:

=== Incoming transfers ===
Vanderbilt incoming transfers
Name	Number	Pos.	Height	Year	Hometown	Previous school
Leilani Kapinus	5	G	5'10"	Graduate student	Madison, Wisconsin	Penn State
Jane Nwaba	10	F	5'10"	Graduate student	Carson, California	Pepperdine

== Roster ==
2024–25 Vanderbilt Commodores women's basketball team
Players
Coaches

Pos.	#	Name	Height	Year	Previous school	Hometown
G	1	Mikayla Blakes	5 ft 8 in (1.73 m)	Fr	Rutgers Prep	Somerset, NJ
G	2	Jada Brown	5 ft 8 in (1.73 m)	Jr	Bentonville HS	Bentonville, AR
G	4	Madison Greene	5 ft 6 in (1.68 m)	So	Pickerington Central HS	Columbus, OH
G	5	Leilani Kapinus	5 ft 10 in (1.78 m)	GS	James Madison Memorial HS; Penn State	Madison, WI
F	10	Jane Nwaba	5 ft 10 in (1.78 m)	GS	Palisades Charter HS; Pepperdine	Carson, CA
G	11	Jordyn Oliver	5 ft 10 in (1.78 m)	GS	Prosper HS; Duke	Prosper, TX
F	12	Khamil Pierre	6 ft 2 in (1.88 m)	So	Perry HS	Phoenix, AZ
G/F	13	Justine Pissott	6 ft 4 in (1.93 m)	Jr	Red Bank Catholic HS; Tennessee	Toms River, NJ
F	14	Aiyana Mitchell	6 ft 4 in (1.93 m)	So	Fountain-Fort Carson HS	Colorado Springs, CO
G	23	Iyana Moore	5 ft 8 in (1.73 m)	Sr	Blackman HS	Milwaukee, WI
G	24	Aga Makurat	6 ft 3 in (1.91 m)	So	Sopocka Akademia Tenisowa	Sierakowice, Poland
F	30	Trinity Wilson	6 ft 3 in (1.91 m)	Fr	Lakeville North HS	Lakeville, MN
F	35	Sacha Washington	6 ft 2 in (1.88 m)	Sr	Collins Hill HS	Lawrenceville, GA

Head coach

- Shea Ralph (Connecticut)

Assistant coach(es)

- Kevin DeMille (Connecticut)
- Ashley Earley (Vanderbilt)
- Tom Garrick (Rhode Island)
- Eric Mundinger (Memphis)

Legend

- (C) Team captain
- (S) Suspended
- (I) Ineligible
- (W) Walk-on
- Injured
- Current redshirt

Roster

== Schedule and results ==
Date time, TV	Rank^{#}	Opponent^{#}	Result	Record	High points	High rebounds	High assists	Site (attendance) city, state
Non-conference regular season
November 4, 2024*; 11:00 am, SECN+/ESPN+		Lipscomb	W 102–50	1–0	25 – Pierre	14 – Pierre	5 – Blakes	Memorial Gymnasium (5,282); Nashville, TN
November 8, 2024*; 6:30 pm, SECN+/ESPN+		Austin Peay	W 93–37	2–0	16 – Tied	10 – Pierre	3 – Tied	Memorial Gymnasium (2,343); Nashville, TN
November 14, 2024*; 6:00 pm, ESPN+		at South Florida	W 62–49	3–0	17 – Pierre	10 – Pierre	3 – Oliver	Yuengling Center (2,606); Tampa, FL
November 17, 2024*; 2:00 pm, SECN+/ESPN+		Butler	W 81–52	4–0	29 – Blakes	8 – Pierre	6 – Oliver	Memorial Gymnasium (2,615); Nashville, TN
November 20, 2024*; 6:30 pm, SECN+/ESPN+		Hampton	W 94–45	5–0	22 – Blakes	12 – Pierre	8 – Blakes	Memorial Gymnasium (2,353); Nashville, TN
November 22, 2024*; 6:30 pm, SECN+/ESPN+		Samford	W 104–59	6–0	21 – Pierre	12 – Pierre	6 – Tied	Memorial Gymnasium (2,524); Nashville, TN
November 26, 2024*; 3:30 pm, TruTV		vs. Arizona; Acrisure Classic semifinal	W 71–60	7–0	25 – Pierre	15 – Pierre	4 – Tied	Acrisure Arena (450); Palm Desert, CA
November 27, 2024*; 3:30 pm, TruTV		vs. Michigan State; Acrisure Classic championship	L 70–78	7–1	19 – Pierre	6 – Tied	4 – Tied	Acrisure Arena (615); Palm Desert, CA
December 1, 2024*; 2:00 pm, SECN+/ESPN+		Appalachian State	W 94–40	8–1	20 – Blakes	7 – Tied	6 – Blakes	Memorial Gymnasium (2,621); Nashville, TN
December 4, 2024*; 4:00 pm, ACCN		at Miami (FL); ACC–SEC Challenge	W 88–70	9–1	28 – Pierre	13 – Pierre	7 – Moore	Watsco Center (2,107); Coral Gables, FL
December 14, 2024*; 2:00 pm, SECN+/ESPN+		Evansville	W 106–40	10–1	42 – Pierre	18 – Pierre	3 – Tied	Memorial Gymnasium (2,599); Nashville, TN
December 19, 2024*; 6:00 pm, ESPN+		at Dayton	W 80–66	11–1	25 – Greene	10 – Pierre	7 – Oliver	UD Arena (1,632); Dayton, OH
December 21, 2024*; 11:00 am, SECN+/ESPN+		West Georgia	W 103–68	12–1	24 – Blakes	10 – Pierre	6 – Blakes	Memorial Gymnasium (2,634); Nashville, TN
December 29, 2024*; 11:00 am, SECN		Alabama A&M	W 93–64	13–1	29 – Pierre	7 – Tied	8 – Oliver	Memorial Gymnasium (3,061); Nashville, TN
SEC regular season
January 2, 2025; 6:30 pm, SECN+/ESPN+		Georgia	W 108–82	14–1 (1–0)	36 – Blakes	10 – Oliver	11 – Oliver	Memorial Gymnasium (3,120); Nashville, TN
January 5, 2025; 2:00 pm, SECN+/ESPN+		No. 16 Kentucky	L 78–96	14–2 (1–1)	24 – Blakes	11 – Pierre	5 – Pierre	Memorial Gymnasium (8,501); Nashville, TN
January 9, 2025; 6:30 pm, SECN+/ESPN+		at Ole Miss	L 59–87	14–3 (1–2)	19 – Blakes	5 – Blakes	6 – Oliver	SJB Pavilion (3,825); Oxford, MS
January 13, 2025; 6:00 pm, SECN		at No. 5 LSU	L 77–83	14–4 (1–3)	28 – Pierre	8 – Pierre	4 – Blakes	Pete Maravich Assembly Center (10,201); Baton Rouge, LA
January 19, 2025; 2:00 pm, SECN+/ESPN+		No. 15 Tennessee; Rivalry	W 71–70	15–4 (2–3)	23 – Blakes	8 – Pierre	2 – Tied	Memorial Gymnasium (8,299); Nashville, TN
January 23, 2025; 6:30 pm, SECN+/ESPN+		Arkansas	W 101–60	16–4 (3–3)	24 – Blakes	9 – Pierre	6 – Oliver	Memorial Gymnasium (3,500); Nashville, TN
January 26, 2025; 1:00 pm, SECN		at No. 19 Alabama	W 66–64	17–4 (4–3)	33 – Blakes	14 – Pierre	3 – Pierre	Coleman Coliseum (2,712); Tuscaloosa, AL
January 30, 2025; 6:00 pm, SECN+/ESPN+	No. 23	at Florida	W 99–86	18–4 (5–3)	53 – Blakes	11 – Pierre	6 – Moore	O'Connell Center (1,709); Gainesville, FL
February 2, 2025; 2:00 pm, SECN+/ESPN+	No. 23	Ole Miss	L 61–76	18–5 (5–4)	24 – Pierre	7 – Pierre	3 – Oliver	Memorial Gymnasium (6,021); Nashville, TN
February 6, 2025; 8:00 pm, SECN	No. 24	at No. 4 Texas	L 66–87	18–6 (5–5)	26 – Pierre	7 – Pierre	4 – Oliver	Moody Center (7,049); Austin, TX
February 13, 2025; 8:00 pm, SECN		Mississippi State	L 77–85 ^{2OT}	18–7 (5–6)	24 – Pierre	12 – Pierre	5 – Moore	Memorial Gymnasium (3,577); Nashville, TN
February 16, 2025; 3:00 pm, SECN		at Auburn	W 98–88 ^{OT}	19–7 (6–6)	55 – Blakes	7 – Mitchell	5 – Blakes	Neville Arena (4,353); Auburn, AL
February 20, 2025; 6:00 pm, SECN+/ESPN+		at No. 16 Oklahoma	L 81–101	19–8 (6–7)	34 – Blakes	4 – Tied	4 – Pierre	Lloyd Noble Center (4,073); Norman, OK
February 23, 2025; 2:00 pm, SECN+/ESPN+		No. 6 South Carolina	L 54–82	19–9 (6–8)	19 – Blakes	10 – Pierre	2 – Tied	Memorial Gymnasium (7,805); Nashville, TN
February 27, 2025; 6:30 pm, SECN+/ESPN+		Texas A&M	W 91–58	20–9 (7–8)	31 – Pierre	6 – Tied	5 – Tied	Memorial Gymnasium (4,411); Nashville, TN
March 2, 2025; 2:00 pm, SECN+/ESPN+		at Missouri	W 100–59	21–9 (8–8)	29 – Blakes	10 – Pierre	7 – Moore	Mizzou Arena (3,362); Columbia, MO
SEC Tournament
March 6, 2025; 10:00 am, SECN	(8)	vs. (9) No. 18 Tennessee; Second Round/Rivalry	W 84–76	22–9	24 – Blakes	15 – Pierre	5 – Oliver	Bon Secours Wellness Arena; Greenville, SC
March 7, 2025; 11:00 am, ESPN	(8)	vs. (1) No. 5 South Carolina; Quarterfinals	L 63–84	22–10	20 – Blakes	10 – Pierre	6 – Blakes	Bon Secours Wellness Arena; Greenville, SC
NCAA Tournament
March 21, 2025; 4:30 pm, ESPNews	(7 B2)	vs. (10 B2) Oregon; First round	L 73–77 ^{OT}	22–11	26 – Blakes	8 – Kapinus	7 – Moore	Cameron Indoor Stadium; Durham, NC
*Non-conference game. ^{#}Rankings from AP Poll. (#) Tournament seedings in parentheses. B2=Birmingham 2. All times are in Central Time.

== Rankings ==
Ranking movements Legend: ██ Increase in ranking ██ Decrease in ranking — = Not ranked RV = Received votes
	Week																				
Poll	Pre	1	2	3	4	5	6	7	8	9	10	11	12	13	14	15	16	17	18	19	Final
AP	RV	RV	RV	RV	RV	RV	RV	RV	RV	RV	RV	RV	23	24	RV	RV	—	—	RV	RV	
Coaches	—	—	—	—	RV	RV	RV	RV	RV	RV	—	RV	23	24	RV	RV	—	—	RV	RV	

== See also ==
- 2024–25 Vanderbilt Commodores men's basketball team
