= 2024–25 Arkansas Razorbacks women's basketball team =

Intercollegiate basketball season

2024–25 Arkansas Razorbacks women's basketball
- Conference: Southeastern Conference
- Record: 10–22 (3–13 SEC)
- Head coach: Mike Neighbors (8th season)
- Assistant coaches: Todd Schaefer; Nick Bradford; Lacey Goldwire
- Home arena: Bud Walton Arena

2024–25 SEC women's basketball standings
	Conf.				Overall
Team	W		L	PCT	W		L	PCT
No. 2 South Carolina †	15	–	1	.938	35	–	4	.897
No. 5 Texas	15	–	1	.938	35	–	4	.897
No. 10 LSU	12	–	4	.750	31	–	6	.838
No. 13 Kentucky	11	–	5	.688	23	–	8	.742
No. 11 Oklahoma	11	–	5	.688	27	–	8	.771
No. 21 Alabama	10	–	6	.625	24	–	9	.727
No. 25 Ole Miss	10	–	6	.625	22	–	11	.667
Vanderbilt	8	–	8	.500	22	–	11	.667
No. 20 Tennessee	8	–	8	.500	24	–	10	.706
Mississippi State	7	–	9	.438	22	–	12	.647
Florida	5	–	11	.313	19	–	18	.514
Georgia	4	–	12	.250	13	–	19	.406
Arkansas	3	–	13	.188	10	–	22	.313
Auburn	3	–	13	.188	12	–	18	.400
Missouri	3	–	13	.188	14	–	18	.438
Texas A&M	3	–	13	.188	10	–	19	.345
† 2025 SEC tournament winner Rankings from AP poll

The 2024–25 Arkansas Razorbacks women's basketball team represented the University of Arkansas during the 2024–25 NCAA Division I women's basketball season. The Razorbacks, led by eight-year head coach Mike Neighbors, played their home games at Bud Walton Arena and competed as members of the Southeastern Conference (SEC). After the season was over, Neighbors resigned as head coach.

== Previous season ==
The Razorbacks finished the season 18–15 (6–10 SEC) to finish in a tie for ninth place in the SEC and received a bid to the inaugural WBIT, where they lost to Tulsa in the first round.

== Offseason ==
=== Departures ===
Arkansas Departures
Name	Number	Pos.	Height	Year	Hometown	Notes	Ref
Taliah Scott	0	G	5'9"	Freshman	Orange Park, Florida	Transferred to Auburn	
Samara Spencer	2	G	5'7"	Junior	Fort Lauderdale, Florida	Transferred to Tennessee	
Saylor Poffenbarger	4	G	6'2"	RS Sophomore	Middletown, Maryland	Transferred to Maryland	
Bea Franklin	8	G	5'10"	Graduate Student	Seattle, Washington	Drafted by Chicago Red Stars	
Sasha Goforth	13	G	6'1"	RS Junior	Fayetteville, Arkansas	Became graduate assistant	
Maryam Dauda	30	F	6'4"	RS Sophomore	Bentonville, Arkansas	Transferred to South Carolina	
Makayla Daniels	43	G	5'8"	Graduate Student	Frederick, Maryland	Graduated	
Emrie Ellis	55	F	6'3"	Junior	Vanoss, Oklahoma	Left team	

=== 2024 recruiting class ===
College recruiting
Name	Hometown	School	Height	Weight	Commit date
Phoenix Stotijn; G	Amsterdam, Netherlands	BC Triple Threat	5 ft 9 in (1.75 m)	N/A	
Phoenix Stotijn; G	Recruit ratings: No ratings found				
Jada Bates; G	Powder Springs, Georgia	McEachern HS	6 ft 3 in (1.91 m)	N/A	
Jada Bates; G	Recruit ratings: No ratings found				
Pinja Paananen; F	Laukaa, Finland	Jyväskylä Basketball Academy	6 ft 2 in (1.88 m)	N/A	
Pinja Paananen; F	Recruit ratings: No ratings found				
Danika Galea; C	St. Paul's Bay, Malta	Elite Basket Roma	6 ft 3 in (1.91 m)	N/A	
Danika Galea; C	Recruit ratings: No ratings found				
Overall recruit ranking:
Note: In many cases, Scout, Rivals, 247Sports, On3, and ESPN may conflict in their listings of height and weight.; In these cases, the average was taken. ESPN grades are on a 100-point scale.; Sources:

=== Incoming transfers ===
Arkansas incoming transfers
Name	Number	Pos.	Height	Year	Hometown	Previous school
Kiki Smith	2	G	5'7"	Sophomore	Topeka, Kansas	Hutchinson Community College
Izzy Higginbottom	3	G	5'7"	Senior	Batesville, Arkansas	Arkansas State
Vera Ojenuwa	22	F	6'4"	Sophomore	Delta State, Nigeria	Barton Community College

== Roster ==
2024–25 Arkansas Razorbacks women's basketball team
Players
Coaches

Pos.	#	Name	Height	Year	Previous school	Hometown
G	1	Phoenix Stotijn	5 ft 9 in (1.75 m)	Fr	BC Triple Threat	Amsterdam, Netherlands
G	2	Kiki Smith	5 ft 7 in (1.7 m)	So	Topeka HS; Hutchinson CC	Topeka, KS
G	3	Izzy Higginbottom	5 ft 7 in (1.7 m)	RS Sr	Batesville HS; Arkansas State	Batesville, AR
F	10	Cristina Sánchez Cerqueira	6 ft 1 in (1.85 m)	So	Segle XXI	Granada, Spain
G	15	Jada Bates	6 ft 3 in (1.91 m)	Fr	McEachern HS	Powder Springs, GA
F	16	Pinja Paananen	6 ft 2 in (1.88 m)	Fr	Jyväskylä Basketball Academy	Laukaa, Finland
G	20	Karley Johnson	5 ft 9 in (1.75 m)	Jr	Mustang HS	Oklahoma City, OK
G	21	Loren Lindsey	5 ft 11 in (1.8 m)	RS So	Fayetteville HS	Fayetteville, AR
F	22	Vera Ojenuwa	6 ft 4 in (1.93 m)	So	Barton CC	Delta State, Nigeria
G	23	Carly Keats	5 ft 8 in (1.73 m)	Jr	Neshoba Central HS; Jones County JC	Choctaw, MS
C	25	Danika Galea	6 ft 3 in (1.91 m)	Fr	Elite Basket Roma	St. Paul's Bay, Malta
F	34	Jenna Lawrence	6 ft 3 in (1.91 m)	So	Farmington HS	Farmington, AR
G	44	Maryn Archer	5 ft 7 in (1.7 m)	RS So	Derby HS	Derby, KS

Head coach

- Mike Neighbors (Arkansas)

Assistant coach(es)

- Todd Schaefer (Thomas More)
- Nick Bradford (Kansas)
- Lacey Goldwire (Oklahoma State)

Legend

- (C) Team captain
- (S) Suspended
- (I) Ineligible
- (W) Walk-on
- Injured
- Current redshirt

Roster

== Schedule and results ==
Date time, TV	Rank^{#}	Opponent^{#}	Result	Record	High points	High rebounds	High assists	Site (attendance) city, state
Exhibition
October 18, 2024*; 5:00 p.m.		Northeastern State	W 88–54		26 – Higginbottom	13 – Ojenuwa	9 – Higginbottom	Bud Walton Arena; Fayetteville, AR
Non-conference regular season
November 4, 2024*; 6:30 pm, SECN+/ESPN+		Fairfield	L 67–81	0–1	22 – Higginbottom	10 – Lawrence	3 – Smith	Bud Walton Arena (2,034); Fayetteville, AR
November 8, 2024*; 10:30 am, SECN+/ESPN+		East Texas A&M	W 84–65	1–1	22 – Smith	10 – Lawrence	3 – Higginbottom	Bud Walton Arena (12,267); Fayetteville, AR
November 11, 2024*; 7:00 pm, ESPN+		at Little Rock	W 71–60 ^{OT}	2–1	24 – Higginbottom	11 – Ojenuwa	6 – Higginbottom	Jack Stephens Center (1,254); Little Rock, AR
November 14, 2024*; 6:30 pm, SECN+/ESPN+		UT Arlington	W 93–65	3–1	29 – Higginbottom	12 – Lawrence	6 – Higginbottom	Bud Walton Arena (2,221); Fayetteville, AR
November 17, 2024*; 6:30 pm, BTN		at No. 5 UCLA	L 52–101	3–2	15 – Higginbottom	5 – Tied	3 – Higginbottom	Pauley Pavilion (2,255); Los Angeles, CA
November 21, 2024*; 6:00 pm, SECN		Oral Roberts	L 73–94	3–3	27 – Higginbottom	11 – Ojenuwa	5 – Higginbottom	Bud Walton Arena (2,277); Fayetteville, AR
November 24, 2024*; 2:00 pm, SECN+/ESPN+		Arkansas State	W 76–60	4–3	20 – Ojenuwa	10 – Tied	5 – Tied	Bud Walton Arena (2,548); Fayetteville, AR
November 29, 2024*; 4:45 pm		vs. Oklahoma State; Daytona Beach Classic	L 56–70	4–4	26 – Higginbottom	11 – Lawrence	3 – Higginbottom	Ocean Center (145); Daytona Beach, FL
November 30, 2024*; 12:15 pm		vs. Bowling Green; Daytona Beach Classic	L 78–79	4–5	26 – Higginbottom	7 – Johnson	9 – Higginbottom	Ocean Center (105); Daytona Beach, FL
December 5, 2024*; 6:00 pm, SECN		Boston College; ACC–SEC Challenge	W 75–64	5–5	38 – Higginbottom	10 – Ojenuwa	3 – Smith	Bud Walton Arena (2,252); Fayetteville, AR
December 8, 2024*; 2:00 pm, SECN+/ESPN+		Southeast Missouri State	W 84–45	6–5	19 – Keats	14 – Ojenuwa	4 – Smith	Bud Walton Arena (2,609); Fayetteville, AR
December 15, 2024*; 2:00 pm, SECN+/ESPN+		Texas Tech	L 72–75	6–6	26 – Higginbottom	11 – Ojenuwa	3 – Keats	Bud Walton Arena (2,511); Fayetteville, AR
December 18, 2024*; 8:30 pm		vs. Liberty; Cherokee Invitational Semifinal	L 61–75	6–7	24 – Higginbottom	6 – Tied	3 – Higginbottom	Harrah's Cherokee (719); Cherokee, NC
December 19, 2024*; 6:00 pm		vs. Troy; Cherokee Invitational third place game	L 69–77	6–8	19 – Higginbottom	9 – Cerqueira	7 – Higginbottom	Harrah's Cherokee (563); Cherokee, NC
December 29, 2024*; 2:00 pm, SECN+/ESPN+		Central Arkansas	W 87–70	7–8	26 – Higginbottom	10 – Cerqueira	5 – Smith	Bud Walton Arena (2,976); Fayetteville, AR
SEC regular season
January 2, 2025; 8:00 pm, SECN		No. 6 LSU	L 64–98	7–9 (0–1)	27 – Higginbottom	8 – Ojenuwa	3 – Smith	Bud Walton Arena (3,985); Fayetteville, AR
January 5, 2025; 2:00 pm, SECN+/ESPN+		at No. 5 Texas	L 56–90	7–10 (0–2)	23 – Higginbottom	4 – Tied	2 – Tied	Moody Center (8,113); Austin, TX
January 9, 2025; 6:00 pm, SECN+/ESPN+		at Auburn	W 59–58	8–10 (1–2)	36 – Higginbottom	4 – Tied	2 – Tied	Neville Arena (2,791); Auburn, AL
January 12, 2025; 12:00 pm, SECN		No. 16 Tennessee	L 63–93	8–11 (1–3)	26 – Higginbottom	6 – Tied	2 – Tied	Bud Walton Arena (3,072); Fayetteville, AR
January 19, 2025; 4:00 pm, SECN		No. 19 Alabama	L 62–94	8–12 (1–4)	23 – Smith	6 – Cerqueira	4 – Stotijn	Bud Walton Arena (3,093); Fayetteville, AR
January 23, 2025; 6:30 pm, SECN+/ESPN+		at Vanderbilt	L 60–101	8–13 (1–5)	16 – Keats	8 – Tied	4 – Higginbottom	Memorial Gymnasium (3,500); Nashville, TN
January 26, 2025; 11:00 am, SECN		at No. 11 Kentucky	L 69–89	8–14 (1–6)	32 – Higginbottom	6 – Lawrence	3 – Higginbottom	Memorial Coliseum (4,870); Lexington, KY
January 30, 2025; 6:30 pm, SECN+/ESPN+		Texas A&M	W 72–51	9–14 (2–6)	33 – Higginbottom	10 – Higginbottom	7 – Higginbottom	Bud Walton Arena (2,558); Fayetteville, AR
February 3, 2025; 6:00 pm, SECN		Florida	L 78–108	9–15 (2–7)	40 – Higginbottom	7 – Tied	4 – Higginbottom	Bud Walton Arena (2,243); Fayetteville, AR
February 6, 2025; 6:30 pm, SECN+/ESPN+		at Mississippi State	L 55–78	9–16 (2–8)	26 – Higginbottom	5 – Tied	2 – Tied	Humphrey Coliseum (6,588); Starkville, MS
February 9, 2025; 11:00 am, SECN		at Georgia	L 61–62	9–17 (2–9)	24 – Higginbottom	7 – Ojenuwa	4 – Higginbottom	Stegeman Coliseum (3,034); Athens, GA
February 13, 2025; 6:30 pm, SECN+/ESPN+		Ole Miss	L 50–89	9–18 (2–10)	18 – Higginbottom	7 – Ojenuwa	3 – Stotijn	Bud Walton Arena (2,625); Fayetteville, AR
February 20, 2025; 6:00 pm, SECN		at No. 6 South Carolina	L 55–95	9–19 (2–11)	18 – Smith	5 – Cerqueira	5 – Tied	Colonial Life Arena (16,638); Columbia, SC
February 23, 2025; 2:00 pm, SECN+/ESPN+		No. 16 Oklahoma	L 54–94	9–20 (2–12)	22 – Higginbottom	8 – Higginbottom	4 – Higginbottom	Bud Walton Arena (4,124); Fayetteville, AR
February 27, 2025; 6:30 pm, SECN+/ESPN+		Missouri	L 73–75	9–21 (2–13)	32 – Higginbottom	9 – Higginbottom	5 – Higginbottom	Bud Walton Arena (3,878); Fayetteville, AR
March 2, 2025; 2:00 pm, SECN+/ESPN+		at Texas A&M	W 80–72	10–21 (3–13)	27 – Higginbottom	7 – Cerqueira	5 – Higginbottom	Reed Arena (3,636); College Station, TX
SEC Tournament
March 5, 2025; 12:30 pm, SECN	(13)	vs. (12) Georgia; First Round	L 74–79	10–22	38 – Higginbottom	10 – Cerqueira	5 – Stotijn	Bon Secours Wellness Arena (9,082); Greenville, SC
*Non-conference game. ^{#}Rankings from AP Poll. (#) Tournament seedings in parentheses. All times are in Central Time.

== See also ==
- 2024–25 Arkansas Razorbacks men's basketball team
