= Grand Canyon Antelopes women's basketball =

Basketball team at GCU in Phoenix

Grand Canyon Antelopes
2025–26 Grand Canyon Antelopes women's basketball team
- University: Grand Canyon University
- Head coach: Winston Gandy (1st season)
- Location: Phoenix, Arizona
- Arena: Global Credit Union Arena (capacity: 7,200)
- Conference: Mountain West
- Nickname: Antelopes
- Colors: Purple, black, and white

NCAA Division I tournament Sweet Sixteen
- Division II: 2011

NCAA Division I tournament appearances
- Division II: 1997, 2004, 2009, 2011, 2012, 2013; Division I: 2025

Conference tournament champions
- WAC: 2025

Conference regular-season champions
- 2007, 2008, 2009, 2011, 2012; Pacific West 2025; WAC

Uniforms
Home	Away

The Grand Canyon Antelopes women's basketball team represents Grand Canyon University in Phoenix, Arizona. They are a member of the Mountain West Conference (MWC).

== History ==
GCU began play in 1988, beginning as an NAIA team in District VII. They began play in NCAA Division II in 1991. They joined the Pacific West Conference in 1992 after two years in the Continental Divide Conference. They joined the California Collegiate Athletic Association in 1994, playing in the conference until 2004. After two independent seasons, they joined the Pacific West Conference in 2006. The program underwent the transition to Division I in 2013, joining the Western Athletic Conference. The four-year process means that the team cannot be invited nor play in the Division I Tournament until 2018, though they can play in the WNIT or WBI. They were invited to the 2016 Women's Basketball Invitational, losing 57–51 to North Dakota in the first round. The Antelopes have an all-time record (as of the end of the 2015–16 season) of 367–419, with a 317–381 record outside of Division I.

In their 2025 season, GCU finished conference play undefeated with a 16–0 record. GCU went onto winning the WAC Conference tournament against UT Arlington 65–62. Making it to the NCAA Division I national tournament for the first time in school history.

== 2025 Coaching Staff ==
Name	Position	Consecutive season at Grand Canyon in current position
Winston Gandy	Head Coach	1st
Adrian Sanders	Assistant coach/Recruiting Coordinator	1st
Matt Shewmake	Assistant Coach	1st
Julia Ford	Assistant Coach	1st
Chloe Rice	Assistant Coach	1st
Celeste Taylor	Assistant Coach	1st

== Year-by-year results ==
Season	Team	Overall	Conference	Standing	Postseason	Coaches' poll	AP poll
Jeneane Pence (NAIA District VII) (1988–1989)
1988–89	Jeneane Pence	19–8	9–3		NAIA Bi-District Playoff First Round		
Jeneane Pence:		19–8	9–3				
Jeff Dinkel (NAIA District VII) (1989–1990)
1989–90	Jeff Dinkel	6–22	–				
Jeff Dinkel:		6–22	–				
Jeff Dinkel (Continental Divide Conference) (1990–1992)
1990–91	Jeff Dinkel	9–18	–				
1991–92	Jeff Dinkel	7–22	1–9				
Jeff Dinkel:		16–40	1–9				
Jeff Dinkel (Pacific West Conference) (1992–1993)
1992–93	Jeff Dinkel	7–20	3–7				
Jeff Dinkel:		7–20	3–7				
Julie Hanks (Pacific West Conference) (1993–1994)
1993–94	Julie Hanks	15–11	3–7				
Julie Hanks:		15–11	3–7				
Julie Hanks (CCAA) (1994–1997)
1994–95	Julie Hanks	10–16	4–6	5th			
1995–96	Julie Hanks	9–16	2–8	5th			
1996–97	Julie Hanks	15–11	7–3	2nd	NCAA Division II First Round		
Julie Hanks:		34–43	13–17				
Tim Wilke (CCAA) (1997–2001)
1997–98	Tim Wilke	1–24	1–9	6th			
1998–99	Tim Wilke	9–21	7–13	7th			
1999–00	Tim Wilke	9–18	6–14	T-8th			
2000–01	Tim Wilke	4–23	3–19	T-11th			
Tim Wilke:		23–86	17–55				
Kip Drown (CCAA) (2001–2004)
2001–02	Kip Drown	5–22	3–19	12th			
2002–03	Kip Drown	8–19	5–17	T-11th			
2003–04	Kip Drown	16–12	14–9	T-4th	NCAA Division II First Round		
Kip Drown:		29–53	22–45				
Kip Drown (Independent) (2004–2005)
2004–05	Kip Drown	11–16	–				
Kip Drown:		11–16	–				
Craig Wiginton (Independent) (2005–2006)
2005–06	Craig Wiginton	4–22	–				
Craig Wiginton:		4–22	–				
Craig Wiginton (Pacific West Conference) (2006–2007)
2006–07	Craig Wiginton	23–4	16–0	1st			
Craig Wiginton:		23–4	16–0				
Trent May (Pacific West Conference) (2007–2013)
2007–08	Trent May	19–10	15–3	1st			
2008–09	Trent May	16–12	8–4	1st	NCAA Division II First Round		
2009–10	Trent May	19–8	12–3	2nd			
2010–11	Trent May	29–3	15–1	2nd	NCAA Division II Sweet Sixteen		
2011–12	Trent May	24–4	15–3	1st	NCAA Division II Second Round		
2012–13	Trent May	23–9	14–4	T-2nd	NCAA Division II Second Round		
Trent May:		130–46	79–21				
Trent May (WAC) (2013–2017)
2013–14	Trent May	19–11	10–6	3rd			
2014–15	Trent May	13–14	7–7	4th			
2015–16	Trent May	16–15	8–6	T-3rd			
2016–17	Trent May	15–12	7–7	5th			
Trent May:		63–52	32–26				
Nicole Powell (WAC) (2017–2020)
2017–18	Nicole Powell	16–14	9–5	T-3rd			
2018–19	Nicole Powell	7–20	5–11	7th			
2019–20	Nicole Powell	15–12	10–6	2nd			
Nicole Powell:		38–46	24–22				
Molly Miller (WAC) (2020–2025)
2020–21	Molly Miller	18–7	8–4	3rd			
2021–22	Molly Miller	22–10	14–4	2nd	WNIT First Round		
2022–23	Molly Miller	21–10	12–6	4th			
2023–24	Molly Miller	24–8	16–4	2nd			
2024–25	Molly Miller	32–3	16–0	1st	NCAA First Round		
Molly Miller:		117–38	66–18				
Winston Gandy (WAC) (2025–present)
2025–26	Winston Gandy	13–19	11–9	6th			
Winston Gandy:		13–6	11–9				
Total:		548–526					
National champion Postseason invitational champion Conference regular season champion Conference regular season and conference tournament champion Division regular season champion Division regular season and conference tournament champion Conference tournament champion

== Postseason ==
=== NCAA Division I tournament results ===
The Antelopes made one appearance in the NCAA Division I women's basketball tournament.

Year	Seed	Round	Opponent	Result
2025	#13	First Round	#4 Baylor	L 73–60

=== NCAA Division II tournament results ===
The Antelopes made six appearances in the NCAA Division II women's basketball tournament. They had a combined record of 4–6.

Year	Round	Opponent	Result
1997	First Round	Western New Mexico	L 68–80
2004	First Round	Cal State Bakersfield	L 61–86
2009	First Round	Seattle Pacific	L 48–77
2011	First Round; Second Round; Third Round	Seattle Pacific; Cal State Monterey Bay; Cal Poly Pomona	W 53–51; W 55–35; L 61–68
2012	First Round; Second Round	Cal Poly Pomona; Alaska Anchorage	W 49–48; L 58–77
2013	First Round; Second Round	UC San Diego; Simon Fraser	W 68–57; L 59–76
