= 2024–25 Georgia Lady Bulldogs basketball team =

Intercollegiate basketball season

2024–25 Georgia Lady Bulldogs basketball
- Conference: Southeastern Conference
- Record: 13–19 (4–12 SEC)
- Head coach: Katie Abrahamson-Henderson (3rd season)
- Assistant coaches: Tahnee Balerio; Aliyah Gregory; Ebone Henry-Harris; Nykesha Sales; Isoken Uzamere
- Home arena: Stegeman Coliseum

2024–25 SEC women's basketball standings
| | Conf. | | | | Overall |
| Team | W | | L | PCT | W | | L | PCT |
|---|---|---|---|---|---|---|---|---|
| No. 2 South Carolina † | 15 | – | 1 | .938 | 35 | – | 4 | .897 |
| No. 5 Texas | 15 | – | 1 | .938 | 35 | – | 4 | .897 |
| No. 10 LSU | 12 | – | 4 | .750 | 31 | – | 6 | .838 |
| No. 13 Kentucky | 11 | – | 5 | .688 | 23 | – | 8 | .742 |
| No. 11 Oklahoma | 11 | – | 5 | .688 | 27 | – | 8 | .771 |
| No. 21 Alabama | 10 | – | 6 | .625 | 24 | – | 9 | .727 |
| No. 25 Ole Miss | 10 | – | 6 | .625 | 22 | – | 11 | .667 |
| Vanderbilt | 8 | – | 8 | .500 | 22 | – | 11 | .667 |
| No. 20 Tennessee | 8 | – | 8 | .500 | 24 | – | 10 | .706 |
| Mississippi State | 7 | – | 9 | .438 | 22 | – | 12 | .647 |
| Florida | 5 | – | 11 | .313 | 19 | – | 18 | .514 |
| Georgia | 4 | – | 12 | .250 | 13 | – | 19 | .406 |
| Arkansas | 3 | – | 13 | .188 | 10 | – | 22 | .313 |
| Auburn | 3 | – | 13 | .188 | 12 | – | 18 | .400 |
| Missouri | 3 | – | 13 | .188 | 14 | – | 18 | .438 |
| Texas A&M | 3 | – | 13 | .188 | 10 | – | 19 | .345 |
† 2025 SEC tournament winner Rankings from AP poll

The 2024–25 Georgia Lady Bulldogs basketball team represented the University of Georgia during the 2024–25 NCAA Division I women's basketball season. The Lady Bulldogs, led by third-year head coach Katie Abrahamson-Henderson, play their home games at Stegeman Coliseum and compete as members of the Southeastern Conference (SEC).

== Previous season ==
The Lady Bulldogs finished the season 12–18 (3–13 SEC) to finish thirteenth in the SEC.

== Offseason ==
=== Departures ===
Georgia Departures
| Name | Number | Pos. | Height | Year | Hometown | Notes | Ref |
|---|---|---|---|---|---|---|---|
| Zoesha Smith | 0 | F | 6'1" | Senior | Brunswick, Georgia | Transferred to Georgia Tech | |
| Chloe Chapman | 1 | G | 5'7" | Graduate Student | Mitchellville, Maryland | Graduated | |
| Taniyah Thompson | 12 | G | 5'11" | Graduate Student | Hamden, Connecticut | Graduated | |
| Stefanie Ingram | 13 | G | 5'8" | RS Freshman | Orlando, Florida | Transferred to Florida Atlantic | |
| Jordan Cole | 20 | F | 6'0" | Graduate Student | Alpharetta, Georgia | Graduated | |
| Destiny Thomas | 33 | F | 6'2" | Graduate Student | Atlanta, Georgia | Graduated | |
| Javyn Nicholson | 35 | F | 6'2" | Graduate Student | Lawrenceville, Georgia | Graduated | |

=== 2024 recruiting class ===
College recruiting information
| Name | Hometown | School | Height | Weight | Commit date |
|---|---|---|---|---|---|
| Indya Davis; G | Detroit, Michigan | West Bloomfield HS | 5 ft 9 in (1.75 m) | N/A | |
| Indya Davis; G | Recruit ratings: ESPN: (93) | | | | |
| Trinity Turner; G | Orlando, Florida | Dr. Phillips HS | 5 ft 6 in (1.68 m) | N/A | |
| Trinity Turner; G | Recruit ratings: ESPN: (93) | | | | |
| Mia Woolfolk; F | Midlothian, Virginia | Manchester HS | 6 ft 3 in (1.91 m) | N/A | |
| Mia Woolfolk; F | Recruit ratings: ESPN: (93) | | | | |
| Summer Davis; G | Detroit, Michigan | West Bloomfield HS | 5 ft 9 in (1.75 m) | N/A | |
| Summer Davis; G | Recruit ratings: ESPN: (91) | | | | |
Overall recruit ranking:
Note: In many cases, Scout, Rivals, 247Sports, On3, and ESPN may conflict in their listings of height and weight.; In these cases, the average was taken. ESPN grades are on a 100-point scale.; Sources:

=== Incoming transfers ===
Georgia incoming transfers
| Name | Number | Pos. | Height | Year | Hometown | Previous school |
|---|---|---|---|---|---|---|
| Roxane Makolo | 12 | G | 5'10" | Graduate Student | Saint-Hubert, Quebec | USC |
| Nyah Leveretter | 22 | F | 6'2" | RS Senior | Blythewood, South Carolina | Kentucky |

== Roster ==
2024–25 Georgia Lady Bulldogs women's basketball team
Players
Coaches

| Pos. | # | Name | Height | Year | Previous school | Hometown |
|---|---|---|---|---|---|---|
| G | 0 | Trinity Turner | 5 ft 6 in (1.68 m) | Fr | Dr. Phillips HS | Orlando, FL |
| G | 1 | Asia Avinger | 5 ft 7 in (1.7 m) | Sr | Rosary Academy; San Diego State | Cerritos, CA |
| G | 2 | Savannah Henderson | 6 ft 3 in (1.91 m) | RS So | Timber Creek HS | Orlando, FL |
| F | 4 | Miyah Verse | 6 ft 1 in (1.85 m) | RS Fr | Arizona Elite Prep | Dayton, OH |
| G | 10 | De'Mauri Flournoy | 5 ft 8 in (1.73 m) | Sr | Carrollton HS; Vanderbilt | Villa Rica, GA |
| G | 12 | Roxane Makolo | 5 ft 10 in (1.78 m) | GS | Dawson College; USC | Saint-Hubert, QC |
| C | 21 | Fatima Diakhate | 6 ft 5 in (1.96 m) | RS So | Montverde Academy | Dakar, Senegal |
| F | 22 | Nyah Leveretter | 6 ft 2 in (1.88 m) | RS Sr | Westwood HS; Kentucky | Blythewood, SC |
| G | 23 | Summer Davis | 5 ft 9 in (1.75 m) | Fr | West Bloomfield HS | Detroit, MI |
| G | 24 | Indya Davis | 5 ft 9 in (1.75 m) | Fr | West Bloomfield HS | Detroit, MI |
| F | 30 | Amiya Evans | 6 ft 2 in (1.88 m) | Jr | DME Academy | Pensacola, FL |
| F | 33 | Mia Woolfolk | 6 ft 3 in (1.91 m) | Fr | Manchester HS | Midlothian, VA |

Head coach

- Katie Abrahamson-Henderson (Iowa)

Assistant coach(es)

- Tahnee Balerio (Missouri State)
- Aliyah Gregory (Central Florida)
- Ebone Henry-Harris (Albany)
- Nykesha Sales (Connecticut)
- Isoken Uzamere (Hofstra)

Legend

- (C) Team captain
- (S) Suspended
- (I) Ineligible
- (W) Walk-on
- Injured
- Current redshirt

Roster

== Schedule ==
| Date time, TV | Rank^{#} | Opponent^{#} | Result | Record | High points | High rebounds | High assists | Site (attendance) city, state |
Non-conference regular season
| November 4, 2024*; 5:00 pm, SECN+/ESPN+ | | North Carolina Central | W 96–52 | 1–0 | 18 – Woolfolk | 13 – Woolfolk | 6 – Avinger | Stegeman Coliseum (2,588); Athens, GA |
| November 8, 2024*; 6:00 pm, SECN+/ESPN+ | | Houston | W 61–47 | 2–0 | 14 – Evans | 10 – Evans | 6 – Turner | Stegeman Coliseum (1,739); Athens, GA |
| November 10, 2024*; 1:00 pm, SECN+/ESPN+ | | Furman | W 74–46 | 3–0 | 18 – Flournoy | 9 – Evans | 2 – Tied | Stegeman Coliseum (1,863); Athens, GA |
| November 14, 2024*; 6:00 pm, SECN+/ESPN+ | | Georgia State | L 60–66 | 3–1 | 15 – Avinger | 12 – Evans | 6 – Turner | Stegeman Coliseum (1,472); Athens, GA |
| November 17, 2024*; 2:00 pm, ACCN | | at Georgia Tech | L 67–83 | 3–2 | 28 – Turner | 11 – Evans | 3 – Turner | McCamish Pavilion (2,551); Atlanta, GA |
| November 21, 2024*; 5:00 pm, Peacock | | vs. Tulsa; WBCA Showcase | W 60–44 | 4–2 | 19 – Flournoy | 6 – Turner | 4 – Turner | State Farm Field House; Bay Lake, FL |
| November 23, 2024*; 2:30 pm, Peacock | | vs. Penn State; WBCA Showcase | L 47–67 | 4–3 | 15 – Turner | 9 – Verse | 5 – Avinger | State Farm Field House (735); Bay Lake, FL |
| November 26, 2024*; 6:00 pm, SECN+/ESPN+ | | Prairie View A&M | W 79–62 | 5–3 | 16 – Tied | 7 – Evans | 5 – Flournoy | Stegeman Coliseum (1,672); Athens, GA |
| December 1, 2024*; 2:00 pm, SECN+/ESPN+ | | Hampton | L 74–76 ^{OT} | 5–4 | 17 – Diakhate | 12 – Evans | 7 – Avinger | Stegeman Coliseum (2,133); Athens, GA |
| December 4, 2024*; 5:00 pm, SECN | | Virginia Tech; ACC–SEC Challenge | L 61–70 | 5–5 | 16 – Diakhate | 10 – Tied | 8 – Avinger | Stegeman Coliseum (2,162); Athens, GA |
| December 16, 2024*; 11:00 am, SECN+/ESPN+ | | UNC Greensboro | W 59–52 | 6–5 | 21 – Flournoy | 5 – Makolo | 5 – Turner | Stegeman Coliseum (4,524); Athens, GA |
| December 19, 2024*; 4:00 pm, BallerTV | | vs. Clemson; San Diego Classic | W 75–68 | 7–5 | 14 – Turner | 8 – Evans | 4 – Avinger | Viejas Arena; San Diego, CA |
| December 20, 2024*; 4:00 pm, BallerTV | | vs. Colorado State; San Diego Classic | L 56–72 | 7–6 | 20 – Avinger | 10 – Avinger | 7 – Avinger | Viejas Arena; San Diego, CA |
| December 28, 2024*; 4:00 pm, SECN+/ESPN+ | | Ohio | W 83–50 | 8–6 | 19 – Flournoy | 11 – Verse | 6 – Avinger | Stegeman Coliseum (2,525); Athens, GA |
SEC regular season
| January 2, 2025; 7:30 pm, SECN+/ESPN+ | | at Vanderbilt | L 82–108 | 8–7 (0–1) | 20 – Woolfolk | 7 – Woolfolk | 7 – Avinger | Memorial Gymnasium (3,120); Nashville, TN |
| January 5, 2025; 12:00 pm, SECN | | at Florida | L 57–73 | 8–8 (0–2) | 20 – Turner | 9 – Verse | 6 – Avinger | O'Connell Center (1,656); Gainesville, FL |
| January 9, 2025; 6:00 pm, SECN+/ESPN+ | | Missouri | W 74–72 | 9–8 (1–2) | 19 – Flournoy | 8 – Woolfolk | 7 – Turner | Stegeman Coliseum (2,209); Athens, GA |
| January 12, 2025; 2:00 pm, SECN+/ESPN+ | | Mississippi State | L 68–79 | 9–9 (1–3) | 23 – Turner | 7 – Verse | 6 – Avinger | Stegeman Coliseum (3,410); Athens, GA |
| January 16, 2025; 8:00 pm, SECN+/ESPN+ | | at Texas A&M | L 63–68 | 9–10 (1–4) | 17 – Flournoy | 17 – Verse | 9 – Avinger | Reed Arena (4,108); College Station, TX |
| January 19, 2025; 2:00 pm, SECN+/ESPN+ | | No. 12 Kentucky | L 64–78 | 9–11 (1–5) | 19 – Tied | 10 – Verse | 5 – Avinger | Stegeman Coliseum (3,071); Athens, GA |
| January 26, 2025; 2:30 pm, SECN+/ESPN+ | | at No. 15 Oklahoma | L 55–86 | 9–12 (1–6) | 19 – Woolfolk | 7 – Verse | 3 – Avinger | Lloyd Noble Center (4,176); Norman, OK |
| January 30, 2025; 6:00 pm, SECN+/ESPN+ | | Ole Miss | L 58–63 | 9–13 (1–7) | 19 – Avinger | 6 – Avinger | 4 – Turner | Stegeman Coliseum (2,262); Athens, GA |
| February 2, 2025; 3:00 pm, SECN+/ESPN+ | | at No. 22 Alabama | L 57–72 | 9–14 (1–8) | 15 – Avinger | 7 – Makolo | 5 – Avinger | Coleman Coliseum (2,547); Tuscaloosa, AL |
| February 6, 2025; 6:00 pm, SECN+/ESPN+ | | No. 2 South Carolina | L 42–74 | 9–15 (1–9) | 9 – Tied | 7 – Woolfolk | 1 – Tied | Stegeman Coliseum (6,031); Athens, GA |
| February 9, 2025; 12:00 pm, SECN | | Arkansas | W 62–61 | 10–15 (2–9) | 16 – Woolfolk | 10 – Woolfolk | 5 – Turner | Stegeman Coliseum (3,034); Athens, GA |
| February 16, 2025; 2:00 pm, SECN+/ESPN+ | | at No. 8 Kentucky | L 55–84 | 10–16 (2–10) | 22 – Turner | 9 – Woolfolk | 6 – Avinger | Memorial Coliseum (5,625); Lexington, KY |
| February 20, 2025; 9:00 pm, SECN | | at No. 7 LSU | L 63–79 | 10–17 (2–11) | 28 – Turner | 10 – Diakhate | 3 – Tied | Pete Maravich Assembly Center (10,229); Baton Rouge, LA |
| February 24, 2025; 7:00 pm, SECN | | No. 1 Texas | L 26–57 | 10–18 (2–12) | 9 – Flournoy | 5 – Tied | 2 – Tied | Stegeman Coliseum (2,747); Athens, GA |
| February 27, 2025; 6:00 pm, SECN+/ESPN+ | | Auburn | W 62–59 | 11–18 (3–12) | 17 – Woolfolk | 6 – Tied | 5 – Avinger | Stegeman Coliseum (2,470); Athens, GA |
| March 2, 2025; 12:00 pm, SECN | | at No. 11 Tennessee | W 72–69 | 12–18 (4–12) | 20 – Woolfolk | 11 – Diakhate | 6 – Avinger | Thompson–Boling Arena (12,111); Knoxville, TN |
SEC Tournament
| March 5, 2025; 1:30 pm, SECN | (12) | vs. (13) Arkansas; First Round | W 79–74 | 13–18 | 19 – Avinger | 8 – Diakhate | 4 – Avinger | Bon Secours Wellness Arena (9,082); Greenville, SC |
| March 6, 2025; 1:30 pm, SECN | (12) | vs. (5) No. 10 Oklahoma; Second Round | L 52–70 | 13–19 | 12 – Turner | 6 – Turner | 5 – Turner | Bon Secours Wellness Arena; Greenville, SC |
*Non-conference game. ^{#}Rankings from AP Poll. (#) Tournament seedings in parentheses. All times are in Eastern Time.

== See also ==
- 2024–25 Georgia Bulldogs basketball team
