= 2025 SEC women's basketball tournament =

American college basketball postseason tournament

- Classification: Division I
- Season: 2024–25
- Teams: 16
- Site: Bon Secours Wellness Arena; Greenville, SC
- Champions: South Carolina (9th title)
- Winning coach: Dawn Staley (9th title)
- MVP: Chloe Kitts (South Carolina)
- Attendance: 71,910
- Television: SEC Network, ESPN2, ESPN

2024–25 SEC women's basketball standings
	Conf.				Overall
Team	W		L	PCT	W		L	PCT
No. 2 South Carolina †	15	–	1	.938	35	–	4	.897
No. 5 Texas	15	–	1	.938	35	–	4	.897
No. 10 LSU	12	–	4	.750	31	–	6	.838
No. 13 Kentucky	11	–	5	.688	23	–	8	.742
No. 11 Oklahoma	11	–	5	.688	27	–	8	.771
No. 21 Alabama	10	–	6	.625	24	–	9	.727
No. 25 Ole Miss	10	–	6	.625	22	–	11	.667
Vanderbilt	8	–	8	.500	22	–	11	.667
No. 20 Tennessee	8	–	8	.500	24	–	10	.706
Mississippi State	7	–	9	.438	22	–	12	.647
Florida	5	–	11	.313	19	–	18	.514
Georgia	4	–	12	.250	13	–	19	.406
Arkansas	3	–	13	.188	10	–	22	.313
Auburn	3	–	13	.188	12	–	18	.400
Missouri	3	–	13	.188	14	–	18	.438
Texas A&M	3	–	13	.188	10	–	19	.345
† 2025 SEC tournament winner Rankings from AP poll

The 2025 Southeastern Conference women's basketball tournament was a postseason basketball tournament that determined the champion of the Southeastern Conference (SEC) for the 2024–25 NCAA Division I women's basketball season. It was held at the Bon Secours Wellness Arena in Greenville, South Carolina, from March 5–9, 2025. The South Carolina Gamecocks won the tournament and earned an automatic bid to the 2025 NCAA Division I women's basketball tournament.

== Background and venue selection ==
Bon Secours Wellness Arena in Greenville, South Carolina, hosted the tournament for the eighth time. In October 2024, the SEC announced a contract extension with the venue, which secured the arena as the host for the 2026, 2027, and 2028 editions as well. The arena first hosted the tournament in 2005—at that time as the "Bi-Lo Center", prior to its 2013 name change—before hosting the tournament again in 2017. Since then, it has hosted every year since 2019 with the exception of the 2022 tournament, which was held in Nashville.

== Seeds ==
Seed	School	Conference record	Overall record	Tiebreaker 1	Tiebreaker 2
1	South Carolina^{‡†}	15–1	30–3	Won coin flip	
2	Texas†	15–1	31–3	Lost coin flip	
3	LSU^{†}	12–4	28–5		
4	Kentucky^{†}	11–5	22–7	1–0 vs. Oklahoma	
5	Oklahoma^{#}	11–5	25–7	0–1 vs. Kentucky	
6	Alabama^{#}	10–6	23–8	1–0 vs. Ole Miss	
7	Ole Miss^{#}	10–6	20–10	0–1 vs. Alabama	
8	Vanderbilt^{#}	8–8	22–10	1–0 vs. Tennessee	
9	Tennessee	8–8	22–9	0–1 vs. Vanderbilt	
10	Mississippi State	7–9	21–11		
11	Florida	5–11	16–17		
12	Georgia	4–12	13–19		
13	Arkansas	3–13	10–22	3–1 vs. Auburn/Missouri/Texas A&M	
14	Auburn	3–13	12–18	2–1 vs. Arkansas/Missouri/Texas A&M	1–0 vs. Missouri
15	Missouri	3–13	14–18	2–1 vs. Arkansas/Auburn/Texas A&M	0–1 vs. Auburn
16	Texas A&M	3–13	10–19	0–4 vs. Arkansas/Auburn/Missouri	
‡ – SEC regular season champions, and tournament No. 1 seed. † – Received a double-bye in the conference tournament. # – Received a single-bye in the conference tournament. Overall records include all games played in the SEC Tournament.

== Schedule ==
Game	Time*	Matchup^{#}	Score	Television	Attendance
First round – Wednesday, March 5
1	11:00 a.m.	#9 Tennessee vs. #16 Texas A&M	77–37	SEC Network	9,082
2	1:30 p.m.	#12 Georgia vs. #13 Arkansas	79–74	SEC Network	9,082
3	6:00 p.m.	#10 Mississippi State vs. #15 Missouri	75–55	SEC Network	4,953
4	8:30 p.m.	#11 Florida vs. #14 Auburn	60–50	SEC Network	4,953
Second round – Thursday, March 6
5	11:00 a.m.	#8 Vanderbilt vs. #9 Tennessee	84–76	SEC Network	7,649
6	1:30 p.m.	#5 Oklahoma vs. #12 Georgia	70–52	SEC Network	7,649
7	6:00 p.m.	#7 Ole Miss vs. #10 Mississippi State	85–73	SEC Network	5,127
8	8:30 p.m.	#6 Alabama vs. #11 Florida	61–63	SEC Network	5,127
Quarterfinals – Friday, March 7
9	Noon	#1 South Carolina vs. #8 Vanderbilt	84–63	ESPN	9,853
10	2:30 p.m.	#4 Kentucky vs. #5 Oklahoma	65–69	ESPN	9,853
11	6:00 p.m.	#2 Texas vs. #7 Ole Miss	70–63	SEC Network	8,439
12	8:30 p.m.	#3 LSU vs. #11 Florida	101–87	SEC Network	8,439
Semifinals – Saturday, March 8
13	4:30 p.m.	#1 South Carolina vs #5 Oklahoma	93–75	ESPN2	13,275
14	7:00 p.m.	#2 Texas vs #3 LSU	56–49	ESPN2	13,275
Championship – Sunday, March 9
15	3:00 p.m.	#1 South Carolina vs #2 Texas	64–45	ESPN	13,532
*Game times in ET. # – Rankings denote tournament seed

== Bracket ==
First round Wednesday, March 5 SECN
9	Tennessee	77
16	Texas A&M	37
12	Georgia	79
13	Arkansas	74
10	Mississippi State	75
15	Missouri	55
11	Florida	60
14	Auburn	50

Second round Thursday, March 6 SECN
8	Vanderbilt	84
9	Tennessee	76
5	Oklahoma	70
12	Georgia	52
7	Ole Miss	85
10	Mississippi State	73
6	Alabama	61
11	Florida	63

Quarterfinals; Friday, March 7 ESPN/SECN
1	South Carolina	84
8	Vanderbilt	63
4	Kentucky	65
5	Oklahoma	69
2	Texas	70
7	Ole Miss	63
3	LSU	101
11	Florida	87

Semifinals; Saturday, March 8 ESPN2
1	South Carolina	93
5	Oklahoma	75
2	Texas	56
3	LSU	49

Championship; Sunday, March 9 ESPN
1	South Carolina	64
2	Texas	45
