= Winston Gandy =

American basketball coach

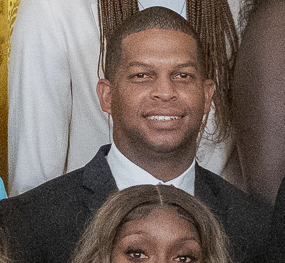
- Gandy (top) in 2024

Current position
- Title: Head coach
- Team: Grand Canyon
- Conference: Mountain West
- Record: 13–19 (.406)

Biographical details
- Education: Maryland (2013)

Coaching career (HC unless noted)
- 2017–2020: Rice (Asst. / AHC)
- 2020–2023: Duke (Asst. / AHC)
- 2023–2025: South Carolina (Asst.)
- 2025–present: Grand Canyon

Head coaching record
- Overall: 13–19 (.406)

Accomplishments and honors

Championships
- As an Assistant: NCAA tournament champions (2024); 2× SEC tournament (2024, 2025); 2× SEC regular season (2024, 2025)

Winston Gandy is an American basketball coach, who is the current the head coach of the Grand Canyon Antelopes women's basketball team.

== College ==
Gandy graduated from the University of Maryland, College Park in 2013 with a degree in economics.

== Coaching career ==
=== South Carolina ===
In April 2023, Gandy was hired by Dawn Staley to join her South Carolina staff. Gandy's hire came after the departure of Fred Chmiel due to being hired as Bowling Green's head coach.

=== Grand Canyon ===
On March 24, 2025, Grand Canyon announced the hire of Gandy as their new head coach.

== Head coaching record ==
Record table
Season	Team	Overall	Conference	Standing	Postseason
Grand Canyon Antelopes (MW) (2025–present)
2025–26	Grand Canyon	13–19	11–9	6th	
Grand Canyon:		13–19 (.406)	11–9 (.550)		
Total:		13–19 (.406)			
