= 2024–25 Alabama State Lady Hornets basketball team =

American college basketball season

2024–25 Alabama State Lady Hornets basketball
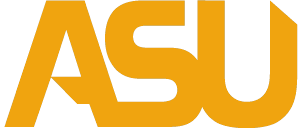
- Conference: Southwestern Athletic Conference
- Record: 6–24 (4–14 SWAC)
- Head coach: Freda Freeman-Jackson (27th season)
- Associate head coach: Clayton Harris
- Assistant coaches: Yvette McDaniel; Courtney Stephens
- Home arena: Dunn–Oliver Acadome

2024–25 SWAC women's basketball standings
	Conf.				Overall
Team	W		L	PCT	W		L	PCT
Southern †	15	–	3	.833	21	–	15	.583
Texas Southern	14	–	4	.778	17	–	16	.515
Alabama A&M	14	–	4	.778	21	–	11	.656
Jackson State	13	–	5	.722	16	–	15	.516
Grambling State	12	–	6	.667	15	–	15	.500
Alcorn State	10	–	8	.556	14	–	18	.438
Bethune–Cookman	7	–	11	.389	10	–	21	.323
Florida A&M	6	–	12	.333	9	–	21	.300
Mississippi Valley State	6	–	12	.333	8	–	23	.258
Prairie View A&M	6	–	12	.333	10	–	19	.345
Alabama State	4	–	14	.222	6	–	24	.200
Arkansas–Pine Bluff	1	–	17	.056	3	–	25	.107
† 2025 SWAC tournament winner

The 2024–25 Alabama State Lady Hornets basketball team represented Alabama State University during the 2024–25 NCAA Division I women's basketball season. The Lady Hornets, who were led by 27th-year head coach Freda Freeman-Jackson, played their home games at the Dunn–Oliver Acadome in Montgomery, Alabama as members of the Southwestern Athletic Conference (SWAC).

Freeman-Jackson announced her retirement from Alabama State on March 25, 2025, after 27 seasons. Rutgers assistant coach Johnetta Hayes, who was previously head coach at Texas Southern and UMBC, was hired by the Lady Hornets on April 11.

== Previous season ==
The Lady Hornets finished the 2023–24 season 3–26, 3–15 in SWAC play, to finish in a tie for last place. They failed to qualify for the SWAC tournament, as only the top eight teams in the conference qualify.

== Preseason ==
On September 19, 2024, the SWAC released their preseason coaches poll. Alabama State was picked to finish tenth in the SWAC.

=== Preseason rankings ===
SWAC preseason poll
Predicted finish	Team	Votes (1st place)
1	Grambling State	276 (10)
2	Southern	232 (2)
3	Alabama A&M	226 (4)
4	Jackson State	211 (4)
5	Florida A&M	178 (3)
6	Prairie View A&M	165 (1)
7	Alcorn State	157
8	Bethune–Cookman	142
9	Texas Southern	117
10	Alabama State	114
11	Arkansas–Pine Bluff	86
12	Mississippi Valley State	46

=== Preseason All-SWAC Teams ===
Preseason All-SWAC Teams
Team	Player	Position	Year
First	Cordasia Harris	Forward	Graduate student

== Roster ==
2024–25 Alabama State Lady Hornets women's basketball team
Players
Coaches

Pos.	#	Name	Height	Year	Previous school	Hometown
G	0	Amari Franklin	5 ft 8 in (1.73 m)	Jr	Bishop State Community College	Pensacola, Florida
F	1	Alanah Pooler	5 ft 11 in (1.8 m)	So	Shelton State Community College	Houston, Texas
F	2	Ryin Tillis	6 ft 1 in (1.85 m)	Jr	St. Francis School	Atlanta, Georgia
G	3	April Hooks	5 ft 8 in (1.73 m)	So	Hewitt-Trussville High School	Trussville, Alabama
F	4	Kaitlyn Bryant	6 ft 0 in (1.83 m)	Jr	Chipola College	Opelika, Alabama
G	5	Solangelei Akridge	5 ft 8 in (1.73 m)	So	Mater Dei Catholic High School	Spring Valley, California
F	10	O'Mariyah Tucker	5 ft 11 in (1.8 m)	GS	Bethune–Cookman	Ocala, Florida
F	11	Justina Graham	5 ft 11 in (1.8 m)	Sr	Chipola College	Long Beach, California
G	12	Kristian Jackson	5 ft 8 in (1.73 m)	Jr	Enterprise High School	Enterprise, Alabama
G	15	Ashley Gray	5 ft 10 in (1.78 m)	Jr	Washington County High School	Washington, Georgia
F	20	Cordasia Harris	6 ft 1 in (1.85 m)	GS	Bishop State Community College	Hayneville, Alabama
G	22	Emani Wofford	5 ft 7 in (1.7 m)	Jr	Lawson State Community College	Nashville, Tennessee
G	23	Taylor Smith	5 ft 5 in (1.65 m)	Sr	Alabama A&M	Fosters, Alabama
F	24	Samiah Puckett	6 ft 2 in (1.88 m)	So	East Tennessee State	Griffin, Georgia
C	30	Anaja Hall	6 ft 5 in (1.96 m)	So	St. Francis School	Atlanta, Georgia
F	33	Talayah Hamilton	5 ft 11 in (1.8 m)	Jr	Strom Thurmond High School	Johnston, South Carolina
C	42	Camariyana Tavares	6 ft 3 in (1.91 m)	So	Rockvale High School	Murfreesboro, Tennessee

Head coach

- Freda Freeman-Jackson (Alabama State)

Assistant coach(es)

- Clayton Harris (Alabama State)
- Yvette McDaniel (Georgia State)
- Courtney Stephens (Alabama State)

Legend

- (C) Team captain
- (S) Suspended
- (I) Ineligible
- (W) Walk-on
- Injured
- Current redshirt

Roster
Last update: June 17, 2025

== Schedule and results ==
Date time, TV	Rank^{#}	Opponent^{#}	Result	Record	Site (attendance) city, state
Non-conference regular season
November 4, 2024*; 6:00 pm		Faulkner	W 70–58	1–0	Dunn–Oliver Acadome (650); Montgomery, AL
November 6, 2024*; 6:00 pm		Stillman	W 55–50	2–0	Dunn–Oliver Acadome (981); Montgomery, AL
November 13, 2024*; 11:00 am, SECN+		at Mississippi State	L 29–83	2–1	Humphrey Coliseum (6,585); Starkville, MS
November 20, 2024*; 6:00 pm, ACCNX		at Virginia	L 50–85	2–2	John Paul Jones Arena (3,675); Charlottesville, VA
November 25, 2024*; 1:30 pm, FloHoops		vs. No. 23 Alabama; Emerald Coast Classic Bay Bracket semifinals	L 33–83	2–3	Raider Arena (200); Niceville, FL
November 26, 2024*; 11:00 am, FloHoops		vs. UAB; Emerald Coast Classic Bay Bracket Consolation	L 43–76	2–4	Raider Arena (200); Niceville, FL
November 30, 2024*; 2:00 pm, SECN+		at No. 18 Ole Miss	L 24–89	2–5	SJB Pavilion (2,770); Oxford, MS
December 6, 2024*; 6:30 pm, ESPN+		at Oklahoma State	L 49–125	2–6	Gallagher-Iba Arena (1,932); Stillwater, OK
December 8, 2024*; 1:30 pm, SECN+		at No. 11 Oklahoma	L 46–110	2–7	Lloyd Noble Center (3,191); Norman, OK
December 18, 2024*; 6:00 pm		West Georgia	L 46–63	2–8	Dunn–Oliver Acadome (466); Montgomery, AL
December 21, 2024*; 12:00 pm, SECN+		at Auburn	L 40–83	2–9	Neville Arena (3,076); Auburn, AL
December 29, 2024*; 2:45 pm, SECN+		at Florida	L 31–88	2–10	O'Connell Center (1,401); Gainesville, FL
SWAC regular season
January 2, 2025; 6:00 pm		Arkansas–Pine Bluff	W 58–46	3–10 (1–0)	Dunn–Oliver Acadome (450); Montgomery, AL
January 4, 2025; 1:00 pm		Mississippi Valley State	W 64–49	4–10 (2–0)	Dunn–Oliver Acadome (2,075); Montgomery, AL
January 9, 2025; 2:00 pm		at Alcorn State	L 54–61	4–11 (2–1)	Davey Whitney Complex (61); Lorman, MS
January 11, 2025; 1:00 pm		at Jackson State	L 44–74	4–12 (2–2)	Williams Assembly Center (695); Jackson, MS
January 18, 2025; 2:00 pm		at Alabama A&M	L 47–54	4–13 (2–3)	AAMU Events Center (5,981); Huntsville, AL
January 25, 2025; 1:00 pm		Prairie View A&M	W 68–62	5–13 (3–3)	Dunn–Oliver Acadome (645); Montgomery, AL
January 27, 2025; 5:30 pm		Texas Southern	L 67–69	5–14 (3–4)	Dunn–Oliver Acadome (655); Montgomery, AL
January 30, 2025; 5:30 pm		at Florida A&M	L 46–82	5–15 (3–5)	Al Lawson Center (400); Tallahassee, FL
February 1, 2025; 2:00 pm		at Bethune–Cookman	L 40–71	5–16 (3–6)	Moore Gymnasium (699); Daytona Beach, FL
February 6, 2025; 6:00 pm		Southern	L 33–48	5–17 (3–7)	Dunn–Oliver Acadome (421); Montgomery, AL
February 8, 2025; 1:00 pm		Grambling State	L 61–70	5–18 (3–8)	Dunn–Oliver Acadome (250); Montgomery, AL
February 13, 2025; 6:00 pm		at Mississippi Valley State	L 57–68	5–19 (3–9)	Harrison HPER Complex (985); Itta Bena, MS
February 15, 2025; 3:00 pm		at Arkansas–Pine Bluff	W 68–63 ^{OT}	6–19 (4–9)	H.O. Clemmons Arena (902); Pine Bluff, AR
February 20, 2025; 6:00 pm		Bethune–Cookman	L 53–56	6–20 (4–10)	Dunn–Oliver Acadome (429); Montgomery, AL
February 22, 2025; 1:00 pm		Florida A&M	L 40–48	6–21 (4–11)	Dunn–Oliver Acadome (203); Montgomery, AL
March 1, 2025; 12:00 pm		Alabama A&M	L 63–71	6–22 (4–12)	Dunn–Oliver Acadome (1,655); Montgomery, AL
March 6, 2025; 5:30 pm		at Southern	L 38–61	6–23 (4–13)	F. G. Clark Center (3,986); Baton Rouge, LA
March 8, 2025; 2:00 pm		at Grambling State	L 53–69	6–24 (4–14)	Fredrick C. Hobdy Assembly Center (985); Grambling, LA
*Non-conference game. ^{#}Rankings from AP Poll. (#) Tournament seedings in parentheses. All times are in Central.
