= 2024–25 Bethune–Cookman Wildcats women's basketball team =

American college basketball season

2024–25 Bethune–Cookman Wildcats women's basketball
- Conference: Southwestern Athletic Conference
- Record: 10–21 (7–11 SWAC)
- Head coach: Janell Crayton Del Rosario (4th season)
- Assistant coaches: Sherrie Tucker; Britney Snowden; Erika Harris; Ronni Williams
- Home arena: Moore Gymnasium

2024–25 SWAC women's basketball standings
	Conf.				Overall
Team	W		L	PCT	W		L	PCT
Southern †	15	–	3	.833	21	–	15	.583
Texas Southern	14	–	4	.778	17	–	16	.515
Alabama A&M	14	–	4	.778	21	–	11	.656
Jackson State	13	–	5	.722	16	–	15	.516
Grambling State	12	–	6	.667	15	–	15	.500
Alcorn State	10	–	8	.556	14	–	18	.438
Bethune–Cookman	7	–	11	.389	10	–	21	.323
Florida A&M	6	–	12	.333	9	–	21	.300
Mississippi Valley State	6	–	12	.333	8	–	23	.258
Prairie View A&M	6	–	12	.333	10	–	19	.345
Alabama State	4	–	14	.222	6	–	24	.200
Arkansas–Pine Bluff	1	–	17	.056	3	–	25	.107
† 2025 SWAC tournament winner

The 2024–25 Bethune–Cookman Wildcats women's basketball team represented Bethune–Cookman University during the 2024–25 NCAA Division I women's basketball season. The Wildcats, who were led by fourth-year head coach Janell Crayton Del Rosario, played their home games at Moore Gymnasium in Daytona Beach, Florida as members of the Southwestern Athletic Conference (SWAC).

== Previous season ==
The Wildcats finished the 2023–24 season 15–16, 6–12 in SWAC play, to finish in a tie for ninth place. They failed to qualify for the SWAC tournament, as only the top eight teams in the conference qualify.

== Preseason ==
On September 19, 2024, the SWAC released their preseason coaches poll. Bethune–Cookman was picked to finish eighth in the SWAC.

=== Preseason rankings ===
SWAC preseason poll
Predicted finish	Team	Votes (1st place)
1	Grambling State	276 (10)
2	Southern	232 (2)
3	Alabama A&M	226 (4)
4	Jackson State	211 (4)
5	Florida A&M	178 (3)
6	Prairie View A&M	165 (1)
7	Alcorn State	157
8	Bethune–Cookman	142
9	Texas Southern	117
10	Alabama State	114
11	Arkansas–Pine Bluff	86
12	Mississippi Valley State	46

=== Preseason All-SWAC Teams ===
Preseason All-SWAC Teams
Team	Player	Position	Year
Second	Kayla Clark	Center	Senior
Second	Chanelle McDonald	Forward	Senior

== Roster ==
2024–25 Bethune–Cookman Wildcats women's basketball team
Players
Coaches

Pos.	#	Name	Height	Year	Previous school	Hometown
G	0	Daimoni Dorsey	5 ft 7 in (1.7 m)	Jr	Saint Frances Academy	Baltimore, Maryland
F	1	Camerah Langston	5 ft 11 in (1.8 m)	Jr	Westlake High School	Chicago, Illinois
F	2	Kayla White	5 ft 6 in (1.68 m)	Sr	Brush High School	Cleveland, Ohio
G	3	Karianna Woods	5 ft 7 in (1.7 m)	Jr	Arbor Prep High School	Ann Arbor, Michigan
G	4	Chariot Johnson	5 ft 9 in (1.75 m)	So	Booker High School	Sarasota, Florida
G	5	Janessa Kelley	5 ft 9 in (1.75 m)	Fr	Blanche Ely High School	Pompano Beach, Florida
F	11	Asianae Nicholson	5 ft 10 in (1.78 m)	Jr	Alabama A&M	South Euclid, Ohio
F	12	Chanelle McDonald	6 ft 2 in (1.88 m)	Sr	Warner	Lake Wales, Florida
G	15	Cassandra Hawthorne	5 ft 11 in (1.8 m)	RS Sr	Coppin State	Hartford, Connecticut
G	21	Shomari Phillips	5 ft 11 in (1.8 m)	Sr	Texas Southern	Winter Haven, Florida
G	22	Jordan Brooks	5 ft 3 in (1.6 m)	Fr	Union Grove High School	Atlanta, Georgia
C	23	Laila Lancaster	6 ft 5 in (1.96 m)	Fr	Lanett High School	Lanett, Alabama
G	24	Alyssa Green	5 ft 9 in (1.75 m)	Fr	Buford High School	Buford, Georgia
C	25	Kayla Clark	6 ft 3 in (1.91 m)	Sr	Miami Central Senior High School	Miami, Florida
C	35	Mya Johnson	6 ft 2 in (1.88 m)	Fr	St. Thomas Aquinas High School	Fort Lauderdale, Florida

Head coach

- Janell Crayton Del Rosario (Davidson)

Assistant coach(es)

- Sherrie Tucker (Coppin State)
- Brittany Snowden (East Tennessee State)
- Erika Harris (Niagara)
- Ronni Williams (Florida)

Legend

- (C) Team captain
- (S) Suspended
- (I) Ineligible
- (W) Walk-on
- Injured
- Current redshirt

Roster
Last update: June 13, 2025

== Schedule and results ==
Date time, TV	Rank^{#}	Opponent^{#}	Result	Record	Site (attendance) city, state
Non-conference regular season
November 4, 2024*; 6:00 pm, ESPN+		at South Florida	L 44–87	0–1	Yuengling Center (2,466); Tampa, FL
November 9, 2024*; 2:00 pm		Fort Lauderdale	W 102–27	1–1	Moore Gymnasium (477); Daytona Beach, FL
November 12, 2024*; 6:00 pm, ESPN+		at Georgia Southern	L 50–54	1–2	Hanner Fieldhouse (812); Statesboro, GA
November 16, 2024*; 2:00 pm, ESPN+		at Florida Atlantic	L 49–78	1–3	Eleanor R. Baldwin Arena; Boca Raton, FL
November 19, 2024*; 11:00 am		Trinity Baptist	W 117–34	2–3	Moore Gymnasium (711); Daytona Beach, FL
November 24, 2024*; 4:00 pm, ACCN		at Virginia	L 48–82	2–4	John Paul Jones Arena (687); Charlottesville, VA
November 30, 2024*; 2:00 pm		Mercer	L 64–70	2–5	Moore Gymnasium (222); Daytona Beach, FL
December 8, 2024*; 2:00 pm, ACCNX		at Miami (FL)	L 63–81	2–6	Watsco Center (2,735); Coral Gables, FL
December 13, 2024*; 7:00 pm, ESPN+		at Cleveland State	L 59–78	2–7	Woodling Gym (384); Cleveland, OH
December 19, 2024*; 1:30 pm		vs. Bradley; Hatter Classic	L 36–71	2–8	Insight Credit Union Arena (122); DeLand, FL
December 20, 2024*; 1:30 pm		vs. South Alabama; Hatter Classic	W 67–62	3–8	Insight Credit Union Arena (117); DeLand, FL
December 30, 2024*; 2:00 pm, FloCollege		at Campbell	L 50–64	3–9	Gore Arena (1,152); Buies Creek, NC
SWAC regular season
January 4, 2025; 4:00 pm		at Florida A&M	L 54–62	3–10 (0–1)	Al Lawson Center (2,312); Tallahassee, FL
January 9, 2025; 7:30 pm		at Southern	L 56–73	3–11 (0–2)	F. G. Clark Center (1,875); Baton Rouge, LA
January 11, 2025; 3:00 pm		at Grambling State	W 70–52	4–11 (1–2)	Fredrick C. Hobdy Assembly Center (687); Grambling, LA
January 16, 2025; 7:00 pm		Arkansas–Pine Bluff	W 62–58	5–11 (2–2)	Moore Gymnasium (551); Daytona Beach, FL
January 18, 2025; 3:00 pm		Mississippi Valley State	W 67–49	6–11 (3–2)	Moore Gymnasium (676); Daytona Beach, FL
January 25, 2025; 2:00 pm		at Jackson State	L 47–64	6–12 (3–3)	Williams Assembly Center (927); Jackson, MS
January 27, 2025; 4:00 pm		at Alcorn State	L 58–68	6–13 (3–4)	Davey Whitney Complex (95); Lorman, MS
January 30, 2025; 7:00 pm		Alabama A&M	L 49–66	6–14 (3–5)	Moore Gymnasium (588); Daytona Beach, FL
February 1, 2025; 3:00 pm		Alabama State	W 71–40	7–14 (4–5)	Moore Gymnasium (699); Daytona Beach, FL
February 6, 2025; 7:00 pm		at Texas Southern	L 57–64	7–15 (4–6)	H&PE Arena (629); Houston, TX
February 8, 2025; 3:00 pm		at Prairie View A&M	L 60–65	7–16 (4–7)	William Nicks Building (180); Prairie View, TX
February 13, 2025; 7:00 pm		Jackson State	L 53–59	7–17 (4–8)	Moore Gymnasium (457); Daytona Beach, FL
February 15, 2025; 3:00 pm		Alcorn State	W 65–52	8–17 (5–8)	Moore Gymnasium (516); Daytona Beach, FL
February 20, 2025; 7:00 pm		at Alabama State	W 56–53	9–17 (6–8)	Dunn–Oliver Acadome (429); Montgomery, AL
February 22, 2025; 3:00 pm		at Alabama A&M	L 62–70	9–18 (6–9)	AAMU Events Center (1,079); Huntsville, AL
February 27, 2025; 7:00 pm		Grambling State	L 59–71	9–19 (6–10)	Moore Gymnasium (481); Daytona Beach, FL
March 1, 2025; 3:00 pm		Southern	L 54–62	9–20 (6–11)	Moore Gymnasium (113); Daytona Beach, FL
March 8, 2025; 3:00 pm		Florida A&M	W 71–60 ^{OT}	10–20 (7–11)	Moore Gymnasium (904); Daytona Beach, FL
SWAC tournament
March 11, 2025; 11:00 am, ESPN+	(7)	vs. (10) Prairie View A&M; First Round	L 52–57 ^{OT}	10–21	Gateway Center Arena (350); College Park, GA
*Non-conference game. ^{#}Rankings from AP Poll. (#) Tournament seedings in parentheses. All times are in Eastern.
