= 2024–25 Mississippi Valley State Devilettes basketball team =

American college basketball season

2024–25 Mississippi Valley State Devilettes basketball
- Conference: Southwestern Athletic Conference
- Record: 8–23 (6–12 SWAC)
- Head coach: Kimberly Anderson (3rd season)
- Associate head coach: Jason James
- Assistant coach: Ashley Shields
- Home arena: Harrison HPER Complex

2024–25 SWAC women's basketball standings
	Conf.				Overall
Team	W		L	PCT	W		L	PCT
Southern †	15	–	3	.833	21	–	15	.583
Texas Southern	14	–	4	.778	17	–	16	.515
Alabama A&M	14	–	4	.778	21	–	11	.656
Jackson State	13	–	5	.722	16	–	15	.516
Grambling State	12	–	6	.667	15	–	15	.500
Alcorn State	10	–	8	.556	14	–	18	.438
Bethune–Cookman	7	–	11	.389	10	–	21	.323
Florida A&M	6	–	12	.333	9	–	21	.300
Mississippi Valley State	6	–	12	.333	8	–	23	.258
Prairie View A&M	6	–	12	.333	10	–	19	.345
Alabama State	4	–	14	.222	6	–	24	.200
Arkansas–Pine Bluff	1	–	17	.056	3	–	25	.107
† 2025 SWAC tournament winner

The 2024–25 Mississippi Valley State Devilettes basketball team represented Mississippi Valley State University during the 2024–25 NCAA Division I women's basketball season. The Devilettes, who were led by third-year head coach Kimberly Anderson, played their home games at the Harrison HPER Complex in Itta Bena, Mississippi as members of the Southwestern Athletic Conference (SWAC).

== Previous season ==
The Devilettes finished the 2023–24 season 4–27, 3–15 in SWAC play, to finish in a tie for last place. They failed to qualify for the SWAC tournament, as only the top eight teams in the conference qualify.

== Preseason ==
On September 19, 2024, the SWAC released their preseason coaches poll. Mississippi Valley State was picked to finish last in the SWAC.

=== Preseason rankings ===
SWAC preseason poll
Predicted finish	Team	Votes (1st place)
1	Grambling State	276 (10)
2	Southern	232 (2)
3	Alabama A&M	226 (4)
4	Jackson State	211 (4)
5	Florida A&M	178 (3)
6	Prairie View A&M	165 (1)
7	Alcorn State	157
8	Bethune–Cookman	142
9	Texas Southern	117
10	Alabama State	114
11	Arkansas–Pine Bluff	86
12	Mississippi Valley State	46

=== Preseason All-SWAC Teams ===
Preseason All-SWAC Teams
Team	Player	Position	Year
First	Sh'Diamond McKnight	Guard	Senior

== Roster ==
2024–25 Mississippi Valley State Devilettes women's basketball team
Players
Coaches

Pos.	#	Name	Height	Year	Previous school	Hometown
G	0	D'yanna Maxey	5 ft 7 in (1.7 m)	Jr	Indian River State College	Atlanta, Georgia
G	1	Sh'Diamond McKnight	5 ft 7 in (1.7 m)	Sr	Southern Arkansas Tech	Bossier City, Louisiana
G	2	Jaylia Reed	5 ft 4 in (1.63 m)	Sr	Southern Arkansas Tech	Hot Springs, Arkansas
F	4	Kearra Jones	6 ft 1 in (1.85 m)	Fr	Madison East High School	Madison, Wisconsin
G	5	Jaeda Murphy	5 ft 3 in (1.6 m)	Fr	Homewood-Flossmoor High School	Chicago, Illinois
G	10	Teniya Morant	5 ft 8 in (1.73 m)	Fr	Houston High School	Memphis, Tennessee
G	11	Janiya Jones	5 ft 7 in (1.7 m)	Jr	Coahoma Community College	Olive Branch, Mississippi
G	12	Addison Howell	5 ft 7 in (1.7 m)	Jr	Itawamba Community College	Olive Branch, Mississippi
C	15	Clemisha Prackett	6 ft 1 in (1.85 m)	So	Alabama A&M	West Memphis, Arkansas
F	20	Ja'la Douglas	5 ft 10 in (1.78 m)	So	Central High School	Louisville, Kentucky
F	21	Mikaela Parris	6 ft 0 in (1.83 m)	Jr	Harcum College	Toronto, Ontario
F	22	Aaliyah Duranham	5 ft 9 in (1.75 m)	So	Griffin High School	Griffin, Georgia
G	23	Kylah McCullers	5 ft 7 in (1.7 m)	So	West Virginia Wesleyan	Madison, Wisconsin
G	24	Caiside Snapp	5 ft 7 in (1.7 m)	So	Governors State	Joliet, Illinois
G	25	Serenity Echols	5 ft 10 in (1.78 m)	Jr	Independence Community College	Memphis, Tennessee
C	30	Keanna Coburn	6 ft 3 in (1.91 m)	So	Seward County Community College	Olive Branch, Mississippi
C	44/33	Mia Hardin	6 ft 4 in (1.93 m)	Sr	North Carolina A&T	Bastrop, Louisiana

Head coach

- Kimberly Anderson (Claflin)

Assistant coach(es)

- Jason James (Benedict)
- Ashley Shields (Southwest Tennessee CC)

Legend

- (C) Team captain
- (S) Suspended
- (I) Ineligible
- (W) Walk-on
- Injured
- Current redshirt

Roster
Last update: June 16, 2025

== Schedule and results ==
Date time, TV	Rank^{#}	Opponent^{#}	Result	Record	Site (attendance) city, state
Exhibition
October 30, 2024*; 6:00 pm		LeMoyne–Owen	W 66–56	–	Harrison HPER Complex (203); Itta Bena, MS
Non-conference regular season
November 4, 2024*; 11:00 am, ESPN+		at Memphis	L 78–89	0–1	Elma Roane Fieldhouse (1,247); Memphis, TN
November 6, 2024*; 6:00 pm, ESPN+		at Lipscomb	L 56–69	0–2	Allen Arena (175); Nashville, TN
November 13, 2024*; 7:00 pm, ESPN+		at Arkansas State	L 54–114	0–3	First National Bank Arena (693); Jonesboro, AR
November 16, 2024*; 2:00 pm, ESPN+		at UAB	L 66–92	0–4	Bartow Arena (360); Birmingham, AL
November 19, 2024*; 6:30 pm, ESPN+		at Louisiana Tech	L 59–66	0–5	Thomas Assembly Center (989); Ruston, LA
December 1, 2024*; 2:00 pm		Troy	W 66–65	1–5	Harrison HPER Complex (763); Itta Bena, MS
December 5, 2024*; 12:00 pm, ESPN+		at Southern Miss	L 66–77	1–6	Reed Green Coliseum; Hattiesburg, MS
December 8, 2024*; 2:00 pm		Nicholls	L 56–67	1–7	Harrison HPER Complex (512); Itta Bena, MS
December 17, 2024*; 11:00 am, ESPN+		at Houston	L 40–98	1–8	Fertitta Center (1,229); Houston, TX
December 19, 2024*; 1:00 pm, SECN+		at Texas A&M	L 54–96	1–9	Reed Arena (839); College Station, TX
December 21, 2024*; 12:00 pm, SECN+		at No. 25 Ole Miss	L 44–78	1–10	SJB Pavilion (2,356); Oxford, MS
SWAC regular season
January 2, 2025; 6:00 pm		at Alabama A&M	L 53–89	1–11 (0–1)	AAMU Events Center (1,187); Huntsville, AL
January 4, 2025; 1:00 pm		at Alabama State	L 49–64	1–12 (0–2)	Dunn–Oliver Acadome (2,075); Montgomery, AL
January 9, 2025; 6:00 pm		Texas Southern	L 54–80	1–13 (0–3)	Harrison HPER Complex (980); Itta Bena, MS
January 11, 2025; 4:00 pm		Prairie View A&M	W 69–52	2–13 (1–3)	Harrison HPER Complex (1,098); Itta Bena, MS
January 16, 2025; 5:00 pm		at Florida A&M	L 60–88	2–14 (1–4)	Al Lawson Center (402); Tallahassee, FL
January 18, 2025; 3:00 pm		at Bethune–Cookman	L 49–67	2–15 (1–5)	Moore Gymnasium (676); Daytona Beach, FL
January 25, 2025; 4:00 pm		Grambling State	L 62–69	2–16 (1–6)	Harrison HPER Complex (1,523); Itta Bena, MS
January 27, 2025; 5:30 pm		Southern	L 51–71	2–17 (1–7)	Harrison HPER Complex (2,109); Itta Bena, MS
February 1, 2025; 1:00 pm		at Arkansas–Pine Bluff	L 39–68	2–18 (1–8)	H.O. Clemmons Arena (749); Pine Bluff, AR
February 6, 2025; 6:00 pm		at Alcorn State	W 63–59	3–18 (2–8)	Davey Whitney Complex (125); Lorman, MS
February 8, 2025; 2:00 pm		at Jackson State	L 63–76	3–19 (2–9)	Williams Assembly Center (894); Jackson, MS
February 13, 2025; 6:00 pm		Alabama State	W 68–57	4–19 (3–9)	Harrison HPER Complex (985); Itta Bena, MS
February 15, 2025; 4:00 pm		Alabama A&M	L 76–95	4–20 (3–10)	Harrison HPER Complex (1,070); Itta Bena, MS
February 20, 2025; 6:00 pm		at Prairie View A&M	L 50–57	4–21 (3–11)	William Nicks Building; Prairie View, TX
February 22, 2025; 3:00 pm		at Texas Southern	L 72–81	4–22 (3–12)	H&PE Arena (467); Houston, TX
March 1, 2025; 4:00 pm		Arkansas–Pine Bluff	W 78–48	5–22 (4–12)	Harrison HPER Complex (1,995); Itta Bena, MS
March 6, 2025; 5:30 pm		Alcorn State	W 72–63	6–22 (5–12)	Harrison HPER Complex (1,291); Itta Bena, MS
March 8, 2025; 12:00 pm		Jackson State	W 70–68	7–22 (6–12)	Harrison HPER Complex (3,485); Itta Bena, MS
SWAC tournament
March 11, 2025; 5:30 pm, ESPN+	(9)	vs. (8) Florida A&M; First Round	W 68–65 ^{OT}	8–22	Gateway Center Arena (872); College Park, GA
March 12, 2025; 5:30 pm, ESPN+	(9)	vs. (1) Southern; Quarterfinals	L 43–63	8–23	Gateway Center Arena (842); College Park, GA
*Non-conference game. ^{#}Rankings from AP Poll. (#) Tournament seedings in parentheses. All times are in Central.
