= 2024–25 Alabama A&M Lady Bulldogs basketball team =

American college basketball season

2024–25 Alabama A&M Lady Bulldogs basketball
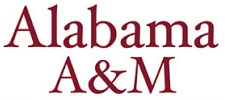

WNIT, First Round
- Conference: Southwestern Athletic Conference
- Record: 21–11 (14–4 SWAC)
- Head coach: Dawn Thornton (1st season)
- Associate head coach: Tim Valentine
- Assistant coaches: Briona Brown; Erika Sisk
- Home arena: Alabama A&M Events Center

2024–25 SWAC women's basketball standings
	Conf.				Overall
Team	W		L	PCT	W		L	PCT
Southern †	15	–	3	.833	21	–	15	.583
Texas Southern	14	–	4	.778	17	–	16	.515
Alabama A&M	14	–	4	.778	21	–	11	.656
Jackson State	13	–	5	.722	16	–	15	.516
Grambling State	12	–	6	.667	15	–	15	.500
Alcorn State	10	–	8	.556	14	–	18	.438
Bethune–Cookman	7	–	11	.389	10	–	21	.323
Florida A&M	6	–	12	.333	9	–	21	.300
Mississippi Valley State	6	–	12	.333	8	–	23	.258
Prairie View A&M	6	–	12	.333	10	–	19	.345
Alabama State	4	–	14	.222	6	–	24	.200
Arkansas–Pine Bluff	1	–	17	.056	3	–	25	.107
† 2025 SWAC tournament winner

The 2024–25 Alabama A&M Lady Bulldogs basketball team will represent Alabama A&M University during the 2024–25 NCAA Division I women's basketball season. The Lady Bulldogs, who were led by first-year head coach Dawn Thornton, will played their home games at the Alabama A&M Events Center in Huntsville, Alabama as members of the Southwestern Athletic Conference.

== Previous season ==
The Lady Bulldogs finished the 2023–24 season 15–16, 10–8 in SWAC play to finish in fifth place place. They were upset by Arkansas–Pine Bluff in the quarterfinals of the SWAC tournament.

On March 19, 2024, the school announced that head coach Margaret Richards would be stepping down from her head coaching position. On April 6, 2024, the school named Arkansas–Pine Bluff head coach Dawn Thornton as the Lady Bulldogs' next head coach.

== Preseason ==
On September 19, 2024, the SWAC released their preseason coaches poll. Alabama A&M was picked to finish third in the SWAC regular season.

=== Preseason rankings ===
SWAC preseason poll
Predicted finish	Team	Votes (1st place)
1	Grambling State	276 (10)
2	Southern	232 (2)
3	Alabama A&M	226 (4)
4	Jackson State	211 (4)
5	Florida A&M	178 (3)
6	Prairie View A&M	165 (1)
7	Alcorn State	157
8	Bethune–Cookman	142
9	Texas Southern	117
10	Alabama State	114
11	Arkansas–Pine Bluff	86
12	Mississippi Valley State	46

=== Preseason All-SWAC Teams ===
Two Lady Bulldogs were named to the first Preseason All-SWAC teams.

Preseason All-MEAC Teams
Team	Player	Position	Year
First	Coriah Beck	Guard	Senior
First	Alisha Wilson	Forward	Senior

== Roster ==
2024–25 Alabama A&M Lady Bulldogs women's basketball team
Players
Coaches

Pos.	#	Name	Height	Year	Previous school	Hometown
G	0	Darian Burgin	5 ft 7 in (1.7 m)	Sr	Walnut Hills High School	Cincinnati, Ohio
G	1	Mailyn Wilkerson	5 ft 6 in (1.68 m)	Sr	Arkansas State	Houston, Texas
G	2	Jaiyah Harris-Smith	5 ft 6 in (1.68 m)	Sr	Little Rock	Miami, Florida
F	3	Alisha Wilson	6 ft 2 in (1.88 m)	Sr	Academy of Art	La Verne, California
G	4	Kourtney Rittenberry	6 ft 1 in (1.85 m)	Sr	Arkansas–Pine Bluff	Loganville, Georgia
F	5	Crystianna Whitehead	5 ft 11 in (1.8 m)	So	Arkansas–Pine Bluff	Cordova, Tennessee
G	8	Nyla Allen	5 ft 2 in (1.57 m)	GS	Savannah State	Jacksonville, Florida
G	11	Aniya Palmer	6 ft 1 in (1.85 m)	So	Georgia State	LaGrange, Georgia
G	12	Tia Harvey	5 ft 9 in (1.75 m)	Sr	Little Rock	Sachse, Texas
G	15	Coriah Beck	5 ft 11 in (1.8 m)	Sr	Arkansas–Pine Bluff	Memphis, Tennessee
C	21	LaCambria Shakespeare	6 ft 4 in (1.93 m)	Sr	Collins Hill High School	Atlanta, Georgia
G	22	Shelomi Sanders	5 ft 6 in (1.68 m)	RS Jr	Colorado	Rockwall, Texas
C	23	Maori Davenport	6 ft 5 in (1.96 m)	Sr	Arkansas–Pine Bluff	Troy, Alabama
G	24	Lauryn Pendleton	5 ft 9 in (1.75 m)	Sr	Arkansas State	Little Rock, Arkansas
G	25	Kalia Walker	5 ft 5 in (1.65 m)	Sr	Arkansas–Pine Bluff	Alexander, Arkansas

Head coach

- Dawn Thornton (Jackson State)

Assistant coach(es)

- Tim Valentine (Southern Wesleyan)
- Briona Brown (Jacksonville)
- Erika Sisk (Mississippi)

Legend

- (C) Team captain
- (S) Suspended
- (I) Ineligible
- (W) Walk-on
- Injured
- Current redshirt

Roster
Last update: November 19, 2024

== Schedule and results ==
Date time, TV	Rank^{#}	Opponent^{#}	Result	Record	Site (attendance) city, state
Exhibition
November 4, 2024*; 6:30 p.m.		Oakwood	W 96–50	–	Alabama A&M Events Center (1,391); Huntsville, AL
Non-conference regular season
November 7, 2024*; 7:30 p.m.		No. 24 Alabama	L 59–84	0–1	Alabama A&M Events Center (5,639); Huntsville, AL
November 9, 2024*; 1:00 p.m.		at Eastern Michigan	W 66–57	1–1	George Gervin GameAbove Center (1,147); Ypsilanti, MI
November 12, 2024*; 5:30 p.m.		UAB	L 67–74	1–2	Alabama A&M Events Center (1,065); Huntsville, AL
November 19, 2024*; 11:00 a.m.		Kansas City	W 57–52	2–2	Alabama A&M Events Center (4,237); Huntsville, AL
November 22, 2024*; 5:30 p.m., FloSports		at Alabama–Huntsville	W 71–68	3–2	Spragins Hall (828); Huntsville, AL
November 29, 2024*; 2:00 p.m.		vs. Utah Valley; San Diego MTE	L 54–56	3–3	Jenny Craig Pavilion (88); San Diego, CA
November 30, 2024*; 2:00 p.m.		at San Diego; San Diego MTE	W 78–67	4–3	Jenny Craig Pavilion (1,012); San Diego, CA
December 7, 2024*; 1:00 p.m., ESPN+		at Lindenwood	W 61–58	5–3	Hyland Performance Arena (297); St. Charles, MO
December 17, 2024*; 6:00 p.m., ESPN+		at North Alabama	W 80–77	6–3	CB&S Bank Arena (1,176); Florence, AL
December 20, 2024*; 1:30 p.m., ESPN+		at Tulane; Tulane Holiday Tournament	L 46–53	6–4	Devlin Fieldhouse (586); New Orleans, LA
December 21, 2024*; 12:00 p.m.		vs. Central Arkansas; Tulane Holiday Tournament	W 55–53	7–4	Devlin Fieldhouse (535); New Orleans, LA
December 29, 2024*; 11:00 a.m., SECN		at Vanderbilt	L 64–93	7–5	Memorial Gymnasium (3,061); Nashville, TN
SWAC regular season
January 2, 2025; 6:00 p.m.		Mississippi Valley State	W 89–53	8–5 (1–0)	Alabama A&M Events Center (1,187); Huntsville, AL
January 4, 2025; 2:00 p.m.		Arkansas–Pine Bluff	W 66–52	9–5 (2–0)	Alabama A&M Events Center (1,503); Huntsville, AL
January 9, 2025; 5:00 p.m.		at Jackson State	L 55–65	9–6 (2–1)	Williams Assembly Center (523); Jackson, MS
January 11, 2025; 1:00 p.m.		at Alcorn State	W 66–56	10–6 (3–1)	Davey Whitney Complex (121); Lorman, MS
January 18, 2025; 2:00 p.m.		Alabama State	W 54–47	11–6 (4–1)	Alabama A&M Events Center (5,981); Huntsville, AL
January 25, 2025; 2:00 p.m.		Texas Southern	L 65–75	11–7 (4–2)	Alabama A&M Events Center (1,017); Huntsville, AL
January 27, 2025; 5:30 p.m.		Prairie View A&M	W 68–59	12–7 (5–2)	Alabama A&M Events Center (1,108); Huntsville, AL
January 30, 2025; 6:00 p.m.		at Bethune–Cookman	W 66–49	13–7 (6–2)	Moore Gymnasium (588); Daytona Beach, FL
February 1, 2025; 3:00 p.m.		at Florida A&M	W 58–54	14–7 (7–2)	Al Lawson Center (450); Tallahassee, FL
February 6, 2025; 6:00 p.m.		Grambling State	W 70–58	15–7 (8–2)	Alabama A&M Events Center (1,109); Huntsville, AL
February 8, 2025; 2:00 p.m.		Southern	L 44–50	15–8 (8–3)	Alabama A&M Events Center (2,135); Huntsville, AL
February 13, 2025; TBA		at Arkansas–Pine Bluff	W 69–55	16–8 (9–3)	H.O. Clemmons Arena (674); Pine Bluff, AR
February 15, 2025; 4:00 p.m.		at Mississippi Valley State	W 95–76	17–8 (10–3)	Harrison HPER Complex (1,070); Itta Bena, MS
February 20, 2025; 6:00 p.m.		Florida A&M	W 70–67	18–8 (11–3)	Alabama A&M Events Center (1,329); Huntsville, AL
February 22, 2025; 2:00 p.m.		Bethune–Cookman	W 70–62	19–8 (12–3)	Alabama A&M Events Center (1,079); Huntsville, AL
March 1, 2025; 1:00 p.m.		at Alabama State	W 71–63	20–8 (13–3)	Dunn–Oliver Acadome (1,655); Montgomery, AL
March 6, 2025; 6:30 p.m.		at Grambling State	L 65–77	20–9 (13–4)	Fredrick C. Hobdy Assembly Center (1,400); Grambling, LA
March 8, 2025; 2:30 p.m.		at Southern	W 48–35	21–9 (14–4)	F. G. Clark Center (3,978); Baton Rouge, LA
SWAC tournament
March 13, 2025; 11:00 a.m., ESPN+	(3)	vs. (6) Alcorn State	L 53–56	21–10	Gateway Center Arena (641); Atlanta, GA
WNIT
March 22, 2025*; 1:00 p.m., ESPN+		at Chattanooga; Round 1	L 49–53	21–11	McKenzie Arena (640); Chattanooga, TN
*Non-conference game. ^{#}Rankings from AP Poll. (#) Tournament seedings in parentheses. All times are in Central.
