= 2024–25 Arkansas–Pine Bluff Golden Lions women's basketball team =

American college basketball season

2024–25 Arkansas–Pine Bluff Golden Lions women's basketball
- Conference: Southwestern Athletic Conference
- Record: 3–25 (1–17 SWAC)
- Head coach: Erica Leak (1st season)
- Associate head coach: Freddie Murray
- Assistant coaches: Xavier Johnson; Roderick Woods
- Home arena: H.O. Clemmons Arena

2024–25 SWAC women's basketball standings
	Conf.				Overall
Team	W		L	PCT	W		L	PCT
Southern †	15	–	3	.833	21	–	15	.583
Texas Southern	14	–	4	.778	17	–	16	.515
Alabama A&M	14	–	4	.778	21	–	11	.656
Jackson State	13	–	5	.722	16	–	15	.516
Grambling State	12	–	6	.667	15	–	15	.500
Alcorn State	10	–	8	.556	14	–	18	.438
Bethune–Cookman	7	–	11	.389	10	–	21	.323
Florida A&M	6	–	12	.333	9	–	21	.300
Mississippi Valley State	6	–	12	.333	8	–	23	.258
Prairie View A&M	6	–	12	.333	10	–	19	.345
Alabama State	4	–	14	.222	6	–	24	.200
Arkansas–Pine Bluff	1	–	17	.056	3	–	25	.107
† 2025 SWAC tournament winner

The 2024–25 Arkansas–Pine Bluff Golden Lions women's basketball team represented the University of Arkansas at Pine Bluff during the 2024–25 NCAA Division I women's basketball season. The Golden Lions, who were led by first-year head coach Erica Leak, played their home games at the H.O. Clemmons Arena in Pine Bluff, Arkansas as members of the Southwestern Athletic Conference (SWAC).

== Previous season ==
The Golden Lions finished the 2023–24 season 17–16, 11–7 in SWAC play, to finish in fourth place. They defeated Alabama A&M, before falling to top-seeded and eventual tournament champions Jackson State in the semifinals of the SWAC tournament.

On April 6, 2024, head coach Dawn Thornton announced that she would be stepping down from her position of head coach after six seasons, in order to take the head coaching job at fellow SWAC school Alabama A&M. On April 25, the school announced that they would be hiring West Memphis High School head coach Erica Leak as Thornton's successor.

== Preseason ==
On September 19, 2024, the SWAC released their preseason coaches poll. Arkansas–Pine Bluff was picked to finish eleventh in the SWAC.

=== Preseason rankings ===
SWAC preseason poll
Predicted finish	Team	Votes (1st place)
1	Grambling State	276 (10)
2	Southern	232 (2)
3	Alabama A&M	226 (4)
4	Jackson State	211 (4)
5	Florida A&M	178 (3)
6	Prairie View A&M	165 (1)
7	Alcorn State	157
8	Bethune–Cookman	142
9	Texas Southern	117
10	Alabama State	114
11	Arkansas–Pine Bluff	86
12	Mississippi Valley State	46

=== Preseason All-SWAC Teams ===
No Golden Lions were named to the first or second Preseason All-SWAC teams.

== Roster ==
2024–25 Arkansas–Pine Bluff Golden Lions women's basketball team
Players
Coaches

Pos.	#	Name	Height	Year	Previous school	Hometown
G	0	Janiyah Tucker	5 ft 6 in (1.68 m)	Fr	West Memphis High School	West Memphis, Arkansas
G	1	Jailah Pelly	5 ft 10 in (1.78 m)	So	Indiana State	Belleville, Illinois
G	2	Aryah Hazley	5 ft 7 in (1.7 m)	Sr	Arkansas State Mid-South	West Memphis, Arkansas
C	4	Briontanay Marshall	6 ft 2 in (1.88 m)	Jr	Walters State Community College	Louisville, Kentucky
G	5	D'arrah Allen	5 ft 8 in (1.73 m)	Jr	UTEP	Compton, California
G	7	Nadiyah Byard	6 ft 0 in (1.83 m)	Jr	Appalachian State	Griffin, Georgia
G	10	Jazmyn Sostand	6 ft 0 in (1.83 m)	Jr	Kilgore College	Beaumont, Texas
G	12	Kristyna Boyd	5 ft 9 in (1.75 m)	Jr	Walters State Community College	Memphis, Tennessee
G	13	Uriah Jennings	5 ft 8 in (1.73 m)	So	Cleveland Heights High School	Mayfield Heights, Ohio
C	15	Mariam Traore	6 ft 4 in (1.93 m)	Jr	South Mountain Community College	Tempe, Arizona
G	17	Empress Roberts	5 ft 7 in (1.7 m)	Jr	Harker Heights High School	Harker Heights, Texas
G	21	Ashley Rojas	5 ft 10 in (1.78 m)	Jr	Union College	Santo Domingo, Dominican Republic
F	32	Stephanie Okowi	6 ft 0 in (1.83 m)	Sr	Oakland Tech High School	Oakland, California

Head coach

- Erica Leak (Louisiana Tech)

Assistant coach(es)

- Freddie Murray (Jackson State)
- Xavier Johnson (William Penn)
- Roderick Woods (Eastern Kentucky)

Legend

- (C) Team captain
- (S) Suspended
- (I) Ineligible
- (W) Walk-on
- Injured
- Current redshirt

Roster
Last update: June 17, 2025

== Schedule and results ==
Date time, TV	Rank^{#}	Opponent^{#}	Result	Record	Site (attendance) city, state
Non-conference regular season
November 4, 2024*; 5:00 pm, ESPN+		at Oklahoma State	L 43–96	0–1	Gallagher-Iba Arena (1,558); Stillwater, OK
November 6, 2024*; 6:30 pm, ESPN+		at Tulsa	L 60–63	0–2	Reynolds Center (1,355); Tulsa, OK
November 10, 2024*; 2:00 pm, SECN+		at No. 20 Ole Miss	L 24–85	0–3	SJB Pavilion (2,879); Oxford, MS
November 18, 2024*; 6:00 pm		Texas A&M–Texarkana	W 63–38	1–3	H.O. Clemmons Arena (346); Pine Bluff, AR
November 20, 2024*; 6:00 pm		Arkansas Baptist	W 71–39	2–3	H.O. Clemmons Arena (397); Pine Bluff, AR
November 23, 2024*; 2:00 pm, ESPN+		at Sam Houston	L 48–67	2–4	Bernard Johnson Coliseum (471); Huntsville, TX
November 25, 2024*; 7:00 pm, ACCNX		at SMU	L 58–82	2–5	Moody Coliseum (356); University Park, TX
December 1, 2024*; 3:00 pm		North Alabama	L 48–62	2–6	H.O. Clemmons Arena (347); Pine Bluff, AR
December 16, 2024*; 11:00 pm, SPECTS/ESPN+		at Hawai‘i	L 15–56	2–7	Stan Sheriff Center (1,610); Honolulu, HI
December 19, 2024*; 3:00 pm, ESPN+		at UTEP	L 62–70	2–8	Don Haskins Center (1,228); El Paso, TX
SWAC regular season
January 2, 2025; 6:00 pm		at Alabama State	L 46–58	2–9 (0–1)	Dunn–Oliver Acadome (450); Montgomery, AL
January 4, 2025; 2:00 pm		at Alabama A&M	L 52–66	2–10 (0–2)	AAMU Events Center (1,503); Huntsville, AL
January 13, 2025; 3:00 pm		Prairie View A&M	L 61–68	2–11 (0–3)	H.O. Clemmons Arena (476); Pine Bluff, AR
January 16, 2025; 6:00 pm		at Bethune–Cookman	L 58–62	2–12 (0–4)	Moore Gymnasium (551); Daytona Beach, FL
January 18, 2025; 3:00 pm		at Florida A&M	L 50–84	2–13 (0–5)	Al Lawson Center (579); Tallahassee, FL
January 23, 2025; 6:00 pm		Grambling State	L 57–64	2–14 (0–6)	H.O. Clemmons Arena (647); Pine Bluff, AR
January 25, 2025; 3:00 pm		Southern	L 36–52	2–15 (0–7)	H.O. Clemmons Arena (843); Pine Bluff, AR
February 1, 2025; 3:00 pm		Mississippi Valley State	W 68–39	3–15 (1–7)	H.O. Clemmons Arena (749); Pine Bluff, AR
February 4, 2025; 3:00 pm		Texas Southern	L 65–75	3–16 (1–8)	H.O. Clemmons Arena (648); Pine Bluff, AR
February 6, 2025; 6:00 pm		at Jackson State	L 60–76	3–17 (1–9)	Williams Assembly Center (498); Jackson, MS
February 8, 2025; 1:00 pm		at Alcorn State	L 40–53	3–18 (1–10)	Davey Whitney Complex (200); Lorman, MS
February 13, 2025; 6:00 pm		Alabama A&M	L 55–69	3–19 (1–11)	H.O. Clemmons Arena (674); Pine Bluff, AR
February 15, 2025; 3:00 pm		Alabama State	L 63–68 ^{OT}	3–20 (1–12)	H.O. Clemmons Arena (902); Pine Bluff, AR
February 20, 2025; 7:00 pm		at Texas Southern	L 59–73	3–21 (1–13)	H&PE Arena (378); Houston, TX
February 22, 2025; 2:00 pm		at Prairie View A&M	L 65–67 ^{OT}	3–22 (1–14)	William Nicks Building (320); Prairie View, TX
March 1, 2025; 4:00 pm		at Mississippi Valley State	L 48–78	3–23 (1–15)	Harrison HPER Complex (1,995); Itta Bena, MS
March 6, 2025; 5:30 pm		Jackson State	L 65–74	3–24 (1–16)	H.O. Clemmons Arena (762); Pine Bluff, AR
March 8, 2025; 3:00 pm		Alcorn State	L 59–70	3–25 (1–17)	H.O. Clemmons Arena (1,380); Pine Bluff, AR
*Non-conference game. ^{#}Rankings from AP Poll. (#) Tournament seedings in parentheses. All times are in Central.
