= 2024–25 Southern Lady Jaguars basketball team =

American college basketball season

2024–25 Southern Lady Jaguars basketball
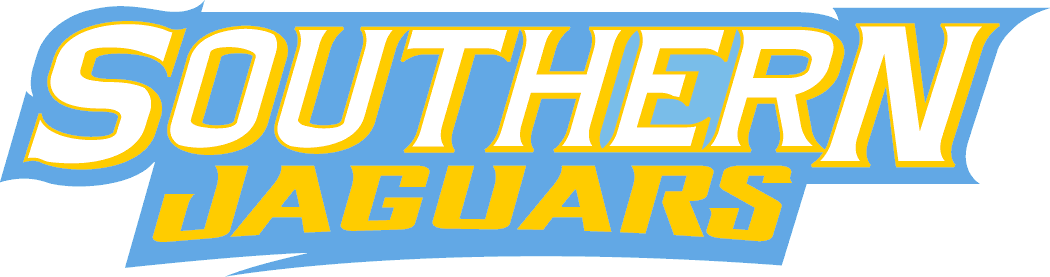

SWAC regular season and tournament champions

NCAA tournament, First Round
- Conference: Southwestern Athletic Conference
- Record: 21–15 (15–3 SWAC)
- Head coach: Carlos Funchess (7th season)
- Assistant coaches: Jeremy Bonin; Patrece Carter; TJ Pugh
- Home arena: F. G. Clark Center

2024–25 SWAC women's basketball standings
	Conf.				Overall
Team	W		L	PCT	W		L	PCT
Southern †	15	–	3	.833	21	–	15	.583
Texas Southern	14	–	4	.778	17	–	16	.515
Alabama A&M	14	–	4	.778	21	–	11	.656
Jackson State	13	–	5	.722	16	–	15	.516
Grambling State	12	–	6	.667	15	–	15	.500
Alcorn State	10	–	8	.556	14	–	18	.438
Bethune–Cookman	7	–	11	.389	10	–	21	.323
Florida A&M	6	–	12	.333	9	–	21	.300
Mississippi Valley State	6	–	12	.333	8	–	23	.258
Prairie View A&M	6	–	12	.333	10	–	19	.345
Alabama State	4	–	14	.222	6	–	24	.200
Arkansas–Pine Bluff	1	–	17	.056	3	–	25	.107
† 2025 SWAC tournament winner

The 2024–25 Southern Lady Jaguars basketball team represented Southern University during the 2024–25 NCAA Division I women's basketball season. The Lady Jaguars, led by seventh-year head coach Carlos Funchess, played their home games at the F. G. Clark Center in Baton Rouge, Louisiana, as members of the Southwestern Athletic Conference.

== Previous season ==
The Lady Jaguars finished the 2023–24 season 15–15, 13–5 in SWAC play, to finish in third place. They were upset by #6 seed Alcorn State in the quarterfinals of the SWAC tournament.

== Preseason ==
On September 19, 2024, the SWAC released their preseason coaches poll. Southern was picked to finish second in the SWAC regular season.

=== Preseason rankings ===
SWAC preseason poll
Predicted finish	Team	Votes (1st place)
1	Grambling State	276 (10)
2	Southern	232 (2)
3	Alabama A&M	226 (4)
4	Jackson State	211 (4)
5	Florida A&M	178 (3)
6	Prairie View A&M	165 (1)
7	Alcorn State	157
8	Bethune–Cookman	142
9	Texas Southern	117
10	Alabama State	114
11	Arkansas–Pine Bluff	86
12	Mississippi Valley State	46

=== Preseason All-SWAC Teams ===
No Lady Jaguars were named to the first or second Preseason All-SWAC teams.

== Roster ==
2024–25 Southern Lady Jaguars women's basketball team
Players
Coaches

Pos.	#	Name	Height	Year	Previous school	Hometown
G	0	Diamond Hunter	5 ft 8 in (1.73 m)	Sr	Sam Houston	Baton Rouge, Louisiana
G	1	Aniya Gourdine	5 ft 9 in (1.75 m)	Sr	Temple	Baltimore, Maryland
G	2	Aleighyah Fontenot	5 ft 9 in (1.75 m)	Sr	Ridge Point High School	Fresno, Texas
G	3	Taniya Lawson	5 ft 8 in (1.73 m)	Jr	Texas Southern	Capitol Heights, Maryland
G	4	DaKiyah Sanders	5 ft 4 in (1.63 m)	GS	Alabama State	Birmingham, Alabama
G	5	D'Shantae Edwards	5 ft 7 in (1.7 m)	Jr	Bethune–Cookman	Baltimore, Maryland
G/F	8	Myca Trail	5 ft 10 in (1.78 m)	RS Jr	Louisiana–Monroe	Lake Charles, Louisiana
G	10	Jocelyn Tate	5 ft 11 in (1.8 m)	Fr	North Little Rock High School	North Little Rock, Arkansas
F	11	Imani Morris	6 ft 3 in (1.91 m)	So	Texas Southern	Cedar Hill, Texas
G	12	Aubri Wilkins	5 ft 5 in (1.65 m)	Fr	Carver High School	Columbus, Georgia
G	14	Soniyah Reed	6 ft 0 in (1.83 m)	Sr	Northshore High School	Slidell, Louisiana
F	15	Sky Castro	6 ft 2 in (1.88 m)	Sr	Saint Peter's	Queens, New York
C	21	Tionna Lidge	6 ft 4 in (1.93 m)	Sr	Andress High School	El Paso, Texas
G	23	Kiana Wilson	5 ft 7 in (1.7 m)	Jr	Florida SouthWestern State	Jacksonville, Florida
F	24	DeMya Porter	6 ft 1 in (1.85 m)	Fr	Bogue Chitto High School	Bogue Chitto, Mississippi
C	32	Xyllize Harrison	6 ft 4 in (1.93 m)	Sr	Garland High School	Garland, Texas

Head coach

- Carlos Funchess (Louisiana–Monroe)

Assistant coach(es)

- Jeremy Bonin
- Patrece Carter (Louisiana Christian)
- TJ Pugh (LSU)

Legend

- (C) Team captain
- (S) Suspended
- (I) Ineligible
- (W) Walk-on
- Injured
- Current redshirt

Roster
Last update: March 18, 2025

== Schedule and results ==
Date time, TV	Rank^{#}	Opponent^{#}	Result	Record	High points	High rebounds	High assists	Site (attendance) city, state
Non-conference regular season
November 4, 2024*; 5:00 pm, SECN+		at No. 10 Oklahoma	L 44–76	0–1	11 – Gourdine	4 – Tied	4 – Sanders	Lloyd Noble Center (4,886); Norman, OK
November 7, 2024*; 6:30 pm, SECN+		at Missouri	L 51–66	0–2	19 – Gourdine	5 – Fontenot	4 – Fontenot	Mizzou Arena (2,727); Columbia, MO
November 10, 2024*; 2:00 pm, ESPN+		at No. 8 Iowa State	L 56–84	0–3	16 – Fontenot	5 – Tate	4 – Gourdine	Hilton Coliseum (10,097); Ames, IA
November 12, 2024*; 7:00 pm, B1G+		at No. 21 Nebraska	L 58–84	0–4	22 – Gourdine	5 – Tied	3 – Sanders	Pinnacle Bank Arena (4,326); Lincoln, NE
November 17, 2024*; 6:00 pm, ESPN+		at Colorado	L 45–65	0–5	12 – Gourdine	6 – Gourdine	2 – Tied	CU Events Center (2,393); Boulder, CO
November 19, 2024*; 7:30 pm, MWN		at Colorado State	L 47–78	0–6	9 – Tied	8 – Gourdine	3 – Gourdine	Moby Arena (1,084); Fort Collins, CO
November 25, 2024*; 10:00 am, FloHoops		vs. No. 20 NC State; Pink Flamingo Championship semifinals	L 47–77	0–7	11 – Fontenot	6 – Gourdine	4 – Edwards	Baha Mar Convention Center (267); Nassau, Bahamas
November 27, 2024*; 10:00 am, FloHoops		vs. Washington; Pink Flamingo Championship 3rd place game	L 43–61	0–8	11 – Gourdine	6 – Gourdine	4 – Sanders	Baha Mar Convention Center (327); Nassau, Bahamas
December 5, 2024*; 6:00 pm		Southern–New Orleans	W 89–34	1–8	13 – Lidge	14 – Tate	6 – Tied	F. G. Clark Center (1,976); Baton Rouge, LA
December 11, 2024*; 7:00 pm, ESPN+		at No. 6 Texas	L 39–97	1–9	12 – Porter	5 – Reed	3 – Fontenot	Moody Center (6,460); Austin, TX
December 15, 2024*; 3:00 pm		Jarvis Christian	W 83–47	2–9	20 – Lawson	10 – Lawson	8 – Sanders	F. G. Clark Center (1,725); Baton Rouge, LA
December 17, 2024*; 7:00 pm, FloHoops		at DePaul	L 64–76	2–10	17 – Fontenot	5 – Porter	5 – Sanders	Wintrust Arena (900); Chicago, IL
December 20, 2024*; 12:00 pm, B1G+		at Illinois	L 57–69	2–11	11 – Edwards	6 – Tate	3 – Tate	State Farm Center (3,396); Champaign, IL
SWAC regular season
January 2, 2025; 6:00 pm		at Prairie View A&M	W 60–48	3–11 (1–0)	12 – Gourdine	10 – Fontenot	3 – Gourdine	William Nicks Building (127); Prairie View, TX
January 4, 2025; 3:00 pm		at Texas Southern	L 51–55	3–12 (1–1)	15 – Lidge	5 – Tied	4 – Gourdine	H&PE Arena (663); Houston, TX
January 9, 2025; 6:30 pm		Bethune–Cookman	W 73–56	4–12 (2–1)	21 – Gourdine	8 – Gourdine	7 – Sanders	F. G. Clark Center (1,875); Baton Rouge, LA
January 11, 2025; 2:30 pm		Florida A&M	W 77–61	5–12 (3–1)	18 – Gourdine	10 – Gourdine	8 – Gourdine	F. G. Clark Center (2,275); Baton Rouge, LA
January 18, 2025; 2:30 pm		Grambling State	W 59–53	6–12 (4–1)	10 – Tied	7 – Lidge	7 – Gourdine	F. G. Clark Center (4,124); Baton Rouge, LA
January 25, 2025; 3:00 pm		at Arkansas–Pine Bluff	W 52–36	7–12 (5–1)	16 – Reed	8 – Lidge	3 – Sanders	H.O. Clemmons Arena (843); Pine Bluff, AR
January 27, 2025; 5:30 pm		at Mississippi Valley State	W 71–51	8–12 (6–1)	15 – Tied	8 – Lidge	4 – Sanders	Harrison HPER Complex (2,109); Itta Bena, MS
January 30, 2025; 6:30 pm		Jackson State	W 64–47	9–12 (7–1)	19 – Fontenot	7 – Gourdine	5 – Gourdine	F. G. Clark Center (2,687); Baton Rouge, LA
February 1, 2025; 2:30 pm		Alcorn State	L 55–59 ^{OT}	9–13 (7–2)	13 – Gourdine	17 – Lidge	5 – Sanders	F. G. Clark Center (2,189); Baton Rouge, LA
February 6, 2025; 6:00 pm		at Alabama State	W 48–33	10–13 (8–2)	12 – Gourdine	8 – Tate	7 – Sanders	Dunn–Oliver Acadome (421); Montgomery, AL
February 8, 2025; 2:00 pm		at Alabama A&M	W 50–44	11–13 (9–2)	20 – Gourdine	7 – Gourdine	2 – Tied	AAMU Events Center (2,135); Huntsville, AL
February 13, 2025; 6:30 pm		Texas Southern	W 63–53	12–13 (10–2)	14 – Gourdine	10 – Lidge	6 – Sanders	F. G. Clark Center (3,678); Baton Rouge, LA
February 15, 2025; 2:30 pm		Prairie View A&M	W 86–42	13–13 (11–2)	19 – Reed	8 – Reed	7 – Gourdine	F. G. Clark Center (3,189); Baton Rouge, LA
February 22, 2025; 2:00 pm		at Grambling State	W 70–47	14–13 (12–2)	15 – Sanders	6 – Castro	6 – Gourdine	Fredrick C. Hobdy Assembly Center (1,506); Grambling, LA
February 27, 2025; 5:30 pm		at Florida A&M	W 65–63	15–13 (13–2)	22 – Gourdine	4 – Lidge	1 – Sanders	Al Lawson Center; Tallahassee, FL
March 1, 2025; 2:00 pm		at Bethune–Cookman	W 62–54	16–13 (14–2)	12 – Tied	8 – Tate	4 – Fontenot	Moore Gymnasium (113); Daytona Beach, FL
March 6, 2025; 5:30 pm		Alabama State	W 61–38	17–13 (15–2)	19 – Reed	7 – Gourdine	6 – Sanders	F. G. Clark Center (3,986); Baton Rouge, LA
March 8, 2025; 2:30 pm		Alabama A&M	L 35–48	17–14 (15–3)	9 – Lidge	8 – Gourdine	6 – Gourdine	F. G. Clark Center (3,978); Baton Rouge, LA
SWAC tournament
March 12, 2025; 4:30 pm, ESPN+	(1)	vs. (9) Mississippi Valley State; Quarterfinals	W 63–43	18–14	13 – Tied	10 – Lidge	4 – Tied	Gateway Center Arena (842); College Park, GA
March 14, 2025; 4:30 pm, ESPN+	(1)	vs. (4) Jackson State; Semifinals	W 51–47	19–14	11 – Gourdine	7 – Reed	5 – Fontenot	Gateway Center Arena (1,872); College Park, GA
March 15, 2025; 4:30 pm, ESPN+	(1)	vs. (6) Alcorn State; Championship	W 64–44	20–14	11 – Tied	10 – Lidge	4 – Sanders	Gateway Center Arena (1,562); College Park, GA
NCAA tournament
March 19, 2025; 8:00 pm, ESPNU	(16 S1)	vs. (16 S1) UC San Diego; First Four	W 68–56	21–14	17 – Gourdine	7 – Gourdine	4 – Sanders	Pauley Pavilion (603); Los Angeles, CA
March 21, 2025; 9:00 pm, ESPN	(16 S1)	at (1 S1) No. 1 UCLA; First round	L 46–84	21–15	10 – Gourdine	8 – Tate	2 – Fontenot	Pauley Pavilion (5,703); Los Angeles, CA
*Non-conference game. ^{#}Rankings from AP poll. (#) Tournament seedings in parentheses. All times are in Central.
