= 2024–25 Prairie View A&M Lady Panthers basketball team =

American college basketball season

2024–25 Prairie View A&M Lady Panthers basketball
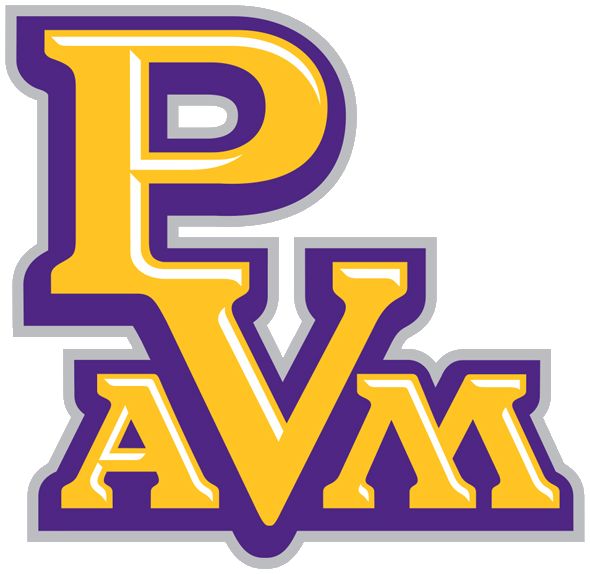
- Conference: Southwestern Athletic Conference
- Record: 10–19 (6–12 SWAC)
- Head coach: Sandy Pugh (7th season)
- Assistant coaches: Rhonda Jackson; David Frank Jr.; Jeanette Jackson; Jaime Gonzales
- Home arena: William Nicks Building

2024–25 SWAC women's basketball standings
	Conf.				Overall
Team	W		L	PCT	W		L	PCT
Southern †	15	–	3	.833	21	–	15	.583
Texas Southern	14	–	4	.778	17	–	16	.515
Alabama A&M	14	–	4	.778	21	–	11	.656
Jackson State	13	–	5	.722	16	–	15	.516
Grambling State	12	–	6	.667	15	–	15	.500
Alcorn State	10	–	8	.556	14	–	18	.438
Bethune–Cookman	7	–	11	.389	10	–	21	.323
Florida A&M	6	–	12	.333	9	–	21	.300
Mississippi Valley State	6	–	12	.333	8	–	23	.258
Prairie View A&M	6	–	12	.333	10	–	19	.345
Alabama State	4	–	14	.222	6	–	24	.200
Arkansas–Pine Bluff	1	–	17	.056	3	–	25	.107
† 2025 SWAC tournament winner

The 2024–25 Prairie View A&M Lady Panthers basketball team represented Prairie View A&M University during the 2024–25 NCAA Division I women's basketball season. The Lady Panthers, who were led by seventh-year head coach Sandy Pugh, played their home games at the William Nicks Building in Prairie View, Texas as members of the Southwestern Athletic Conference (SWAC).

== Previous season ==
The Lady Panthers finished the 2023–24 season 11–18, 7–11 in SWAC play, to finish in eighth place. They were defeated by top-seeded and eventual tournament champions Jackson State in the SWAC tournament.

== Preseason ==
On September 19, 2024, the SWAC released their preseason coaches poll. Prairie View A&M was picked to finish sixth in the SWAC.

=== Preseason rankings ===
SWAC preseason poll
Predicted finish	Team	Votes (1st place)
1	Grambling State	276 (10)
2	Southern	232 (2)
3	Alabama A&M	226 (4)
4	Jackson State	211 (4)
5	Florida A&M	178 (3)
6	Prairie View A&M	165 (1)
7	Alcorn State	157
8	Bethune–Cookman	142
9	Texas Southern	117
10	Alabama State	114
11	Arkansas–Pine Bluff	86
12	Mississippi Valley State	46

=== Preseason All-SWAC Teams ===
No Lady Panthers were named to the first or second Preseason All-SWAC teams.

== Roster ==
2024–25 Prairie View A&M Lady Panthers women's basketball team
Players
Coaches

Pos.	#	Name	Height	Year	Previous school	Hometown
PG	0	CJ Wilson	5 ft 9 in (1.75 m)	Fr	Stockbridge High School	Atlanta, Georgia
G	1	Nyam Thornton	5 ft 8 in (1.73 m)	GS	Penn State	Columbus, Ohio
G	3	Mikayla Hutchinson	5 ft 9 in (1.75 m)	GS	Trinity Valley Community College	Mansfield, Texas
G	4	Kaci Chairs	5 ft 9 in (1.75 m)	GS	Grambling State	New Orleans, Louisiana
G	10	Crystal Schultz	5 ft 8 in (1.73 m)	Fr	Fort Bend Austin High School	Houston, Texas
G	11	Ash'a Thompson	5 ft 10 in (1.78 m)	GS	Houston	DeSoto, Texas
G	12	Amya Edwards	5 ft 8 in (1.73 m)	Fr	Hendrickson High School	Pflugerville, Texas
F/C	20	Adreanna Waddle	6 ft 2 in (1.88 m)	GS	Weatherford College	Fort Worth, Texas
F	21	Nia Jordan	6 ft 1 in (1.85 m)	GS	Bethune–Cookman	Philadelphia, Pennsylvania
F	24	Laila Robinson	6 ft 0 in (1.83 m)	Fr	Madison Prep Academy	Baton Rouge, Louisiana
C	31	Ja'nya Polk	6 ft 6 in (1.98 m)	RS Fr	Itawamba Community College	Oneonta, Alabama
C	44	Amauri Williams	6 ft 4 in (1.93 m)	Jr	Vanderbilt	North Little Rock, Arkansas

Head coach

- Sandy Pugh (Northwestern State)

Assistant coach(es)

- Rhonda Jackson (Arkansas)
- David Frank Jr. (Prairie View A&M)
- Jeanette Jackson (Prairie View A&M)
- Jaime Gonzales (Sam Houston State)

Legend

- (C) Team captain
- (S) Suspended
- (I) Ineligible
- (W) Walk-on
- Injured
- Current redshirt

Roster
Last update: June 17, 2025

== Schedule and results ==
Date time, TV	Rank^{#}	Opponent^{#}	Result	Record	Site (attendance) city, state
Non-conference regular season
November 7, 2024*; 5:30 pm		Texas College	W 105–71	1–0	William Nicks Building (493); Prairie View, TX
November 13, 2024*; 5:30 pm		Jarvis Christian	W 105–62	2–0	William Nicks Building (164); Prairie View, TX
November 18, 2024*; 6:30 pm, ESPN+		at Incarnate Word	L 49–68	2–1	McDermott Center (94); San Antonio, TX
November 22, 2024*; 2:00 pm, B1G+		at Washington	L 50–65	2–2	Alaska Airlines Arena (1,665); Seattle, WA
November 26, 2024*; 5:00 pm, SECN+		at Georgia	L 62–79	2–3	Stegeman Coliseum (1,672); Athens, GA
December 2, 2024*; 6:00 pm, ESPN+		at Wichita State	L 45–74	2–4	Charles Koch Arena (910); Wichita, KS
December 17, 2024*; 6:00 pm, ESPN+		at Western Michigan	L 58–87	2–5	University Arena (695); Kalamazoo, MI
December 20, 2024*; 2:00 pm, B1G+		at Minnesota	L 57–96	2–6	Williams Arena (2,570); Minneapolis, MN
December 29, 2024*; 3:00 pm		Wiley	W 85–44	3–6	William Nicks Building (226); Prairie View, TX
SWAC regular season
January 2, 2025; 6:00 pm		Southern	L 48–60	3–7 (0–1)	William Nicks Building (127); Prairie View, TX
January 4, 2025; 2:00 pm		Grambling State	L 44–67	3–8 (0–2)	William Nicks Building (148); Prairie View, TX
January 11, 2025; 4:00 pm		at Mississippi Valley State	L 52–69	3–9 (0–3)	Harrison HPER Complex (1,098); Itta Bena, MS
January 13, 2025; 3:00 pm		at Arkansas–Pine Bluff	W 68–61	4–9 (1–3)	H.O. Clemmons Arena (476); Pine Bluff, AR
January 16, 2025; 6:00 pm		Alcorn State	W 62–52	5–9 (2–3)	William Nicks Building; Prairie View, TX
January 18, 2025; 2:00 pm		Jackson State	L 48–67	5–10 (2–4)	William Nicks Building (113); Prairie View, TX
January 25, 2025; 1:00 pm		at Alabama State	L 62–68	5–11 (2–5)	Dunn–Oliver Acadome (645); Montgomery, AL
January 27, 2025; 5:30 pm		at Alabama A&M	L 59–68	5–12 (2–6)	AAMU Events Center (1,108); Huntsville, AL
February 1, 2025; 12:00 pm		at Texas Southern	L 69–82	5–13 (2–7)	H&PE Arena (3,017); Houston, TX
February 6, 2025; 6:00 pm		Florida A&M	L 48–65	5–14 (2–8)	William Nicks Building (176); Prairie View, TX
February 8, 2025; 2:00 pm		Bethune–Cookman	W 65–60	6–14 (3–8)	William Nicks Building (180); Prairie View, TX
February 13, 2025; 6:30 pm		at Grambling State	L 54–75	6–15 (3–9)	Fredrick C. Hobdy Assembly Center (577); Grambling, LA
February 15, 2025; 2:30 pm		at Southern	L 42–86	6–16 (3–10)	F. G. Clark Center (3,189); Baton Rouge, LA
February 20, 2025; 6:00 pm		Mississippi Valley State	W 57–50	7–16 (4–10)	William Nicks Building; Prairie View, TX
February 22, 2025; 2:00 pm		Arkansas–Pine Bluff	W 67–65 ^{OT}	8–16 (5–10)	William Nicks Building (320); Prairie View, TX
February 27, 2025; 6:00 pm		at Jackson State	W 71–63	9–16 (6–10)	Williams Assembly Center (368); Jackson, MS
March 1, 2025; 1:00 pm		at Alcorn State	L 39–61	9–17 (6–11)	Davey Whitney Complex (150); Lorman, MS
March 8, 2025; 2:00 pm		Texas Southern	L 60–64	9–18 (6–12)	William Nicks Building; Prairie View, TX
SWAC tournament
March 11, 2025; 10:00 am, ESPN+	(10)	vs. (7) Bethune–Cookman; First Round	W 57–52 ^{OT}	10–18	Gateway Center Arena (350); College Park, GA
March 12, 2025; 10:00 am, ESPN+	(10)	vs. (2) Texas Southern; Quarterfinals	L 49–69	10–19	Gateway Center Arena (975); College Park, GA
*Non-conference game. ^{#}Rankings from AP Poll. (#) Tournament seedings in parentheses. All times are in Central.
