= 2024–25 Florida A&M Rattlers women's basketball team =

American college basketball season

2024–25 Florida A&M Rattlers women's basketball
- Conference: Southwestern Athletic Conference
- Record: 9–20 (6–12 SWAC)
- Head coach: Bridgette Gordon (2nd season)
- Assistant coaches: Andonte Gennie; Rory Spencer; Ericka Cromartie
- Home arena: Al Lawson Center

2024–25 SWAC women's basketball standings
	Conf.				Overall
Team	W		L	PCT	W		L	PCT
Southern †	15	–	3	.833	21	–	15	.583
Texas Southern	14	–	4	.778	17	–	16	.515
Alabama A&M	14	–	4	.778	21	–	11	.656
Jackson State	13	–	5	.722	16	–	15	.516
Grambling State	12	–	6	.667	15	–	15	.500
Alcorn State	10	–	8	.556	14	–	18	.438
Bethune–Cookman	7	–	11	.389	10	–	21	.323
Florida A&M	6	–	12	.333	9	–	21	.300
Mississippi Valley State	6	–	12	.333	8	–	23	.258
Prairie View A&M	6	–	12	.333	10	–	19	.345
Alabama State	4	–	14	.222	6	–	24	.200
Arkansas–Pine Bluff	1	–	17	.056	3	–	25	.107
† 2025 SWAC tournament winner

The 2024–25 Florida A&M Rattlers women's basketball team represented Florida A&M University during the 2024–25 NCAA Division I women's basketball season. The Rattlers, who were led by second-year head coach Bridgette Gordon, played their home games at the Al Lawson Center in Tallahassee, Florida as members of the Southwestern Athletic Conference (SWAC).

== Previous season ==
The Rattlers finished the 2023–24 season 9–21, 8–10 in SWAC play, to finish in a tie for sixth place. They were defeated by Grambling State in the quarterfinals of the SWAC tournament.

== Preseason ==
On September 19, 2024, the SWAC released their preseason coaches poll. Florida A&M was picked to finish fifth in the SWAC.

=== Preseason rankings ===
SWAC preseason poll
Predicted finish	Team	Votes (1st place)
1	Grambling State	276 (10)
2	Southern	232 (2)
3	Alabama A&M	226 (4)
4	Jackson State	211 (4)
5	Florida A&M	178 (3)
6	Prairie View A&M	165 (1)
7	Alcorn State	157
8	Bethune–Cookman	142
9	Texas Southern	117
10	Alabama State	114
11	Arkansas–Pine Bluff	86
12	Mississippi Valley State	46

=== Preseason All-SWAC Teams ===
Preseason All-SWAC Teams
Team	Player	Position	Year
Second	Olivia Delancy	Guard	Junior

== Roster ==
2024–25 Florida A&M Rattlers women's basketball team
Players
Coaches

Pos.	#	Name	Height	Year	Previous school	Hometown
G	0	Sabou Gueye	5 ft 9 in (1.75 m)	GS	New Mexico State	Dakar, Senegal
F	1	Nashani Gilbert	5 ft 10 in (1.78 m)	Sr	Daytona State College	West Palm Beach, Florida
G	2	Aina Subirats	5 ft 8 in (1.73 m)	Jr	Morehead State	Barcelona, Spain
G	3	Tahnyjia Purifoy	5 ft 0 in (1.52 m)	Jr	Chipola College	Pensacola, Florida
G	4	Amiya Lloyd	5 ft 6 in (1.68 m)	So	Riverview High School	Sarasota, Florida
F	5	Sydney Hendrix	5 ft 11 in (1.8 m)	So	West Bloomfield High School	Farmington Hills, Michigan
C	12/25	Jaliya Sharp	6 ft 3 in (1.91 m)	Sr	UNC Wilmington	Garland, Texas
G	13	Ivet Subirats	5 ft 9 in (1.75 m)	GS	Ball State	Barcelona, Spain
G	14	Kayla Massey	5 ft 4 in (1.63 m)	Fr	Jean Ribault High School	Jacksonville, Florida
C	20	Zikeyah Carter	6 ft 6 in (1.98 m)	Sr	Chicago State	Waverly, Georgia
G	21	Monique Judge	5 ft 5 in (1.65 m)	Jr	Bishop State Community College	Leesburg, Georgia
G	22	D'Mya Griffin	5 ft 9 in (1.75 m)	Jr	East Georgia State College	Augusta, Georgia
F	23	Eve Alexander	6 ft 2 in (1.88 m)	Fr	Lafayette Christian Academy	Lafayette, Louisiana
G	24	Cheyenne McEvans	5 ft 9 in (1.75 m)	GS	Syracuse	Detroit, Michigan
F	25	Saige Glover	6 ft 0 in (1.83 m)	GS	Niagara	Columbus, Ohio
G	30	Olivia Delancy	6 ft 0 in (1.83 m)	Jr	St. Petersburg College	St. Petersburg, Florida
G	32	Nya Bostic	5 ft 7 in (1.7 m)	GS	Tallahassee Community College	Decatur, Georgia
F	44	Eliya Ellis	6 ft 1 in (1.85 m)	Sr	Clear Creek High School	League City, Texas

Head coach

- Bridgette Gordon (Tennessee)

Assistant coach(es)

- Andonte Gennie (Georgia Southern)
- Rory Spencer (Georgia Southern)
- Ericka Cromartie (Miles)

Legend

- (C) Team captain
- (S) Suspended
- (I) Ineligible
- (W) Walk-on
- Injured
- Current redshirt

Roster
Last update: June 16, 2025

== Schedule and results ==
Date time, TV	Rank^{#}	Opponent^{#}	Result	Record	Site (attendance) city, state
Non-conference regular season
November 4, 2024*; 6:30 pm		Howard	L 66–78	0–1	Al Lawson Center (2,187); Tallahassee, FL
November 7, 2024*; 5:00 pm, SECN+		at Florida	L 67–102	0–2	O'Connell Center (1,343); Gainesville, FL
November 11, 2024*; 6:00 pm, ACCNX		at Florida State	L 54–93	0–3	Donald L. Tucker Center (2,274); Tallahassee, FL
November 18, 2024*; 6:30 pm, ESPN+		at Jacksonville	L 50–58	0–4	Swisher Gymnasium (563); Jacksonville, FL
November 20, 2024*; 7:00 pm, ESPN+		at West Georgia	L 54–65	0–5	The Coliseum (722); Carrollton, GA
November 24, 2024*; 1:00 pm, ESPN+		at UCF	L 55–80	0–6	Addition Financial Arena (1,187); Orlando, FL
November 26, 2024*; 12:00 pm		Middle Tennessee	L 54–80	0–7	Al Lawson Center (173); Tallahassee, FL
December 1, 2024*; 2:00 pm, ACCNX		at Georgia Tech	L 56–98	0–8	McCamish Pavilion (1,468); Atlanta, GA
December 7, 2024*; 2:00 pm		North Florida	W 85–57	1–8	Al Lawson Center; Tallahassee, FL
December 20, 2024*; 7:00 pm, ESPN+		at Samford	W 72–67 ^{OT}	2–8	Pete Hanna Center (173); Homewood, AL
December 29, 2024*; 2:00 pm		Thomas	W 111–45	3–8	Al Lawson Center (269); Tallahassee, FL
SWAC regular season
January 4, 2025; 4:00 pm		Bethune–Cookman	W 62–54	4–8 (1–0)	Al Lawson Center (2,312); Tallahassee, FL
January 11, 2025; 3:30 pm		at Southern	L 61–77	4–9 (1–1)	F. G. Clark Center (2,275); Baton Rouge, LA
January 13, 2025; 6:30 pm		at Grambling State	L 64–78	4–10 (1–2)	Fredrick C. Hobdy Assembly Center (1,095); Grambling, LA
January 16, 2025; 6:30 pm		Mississippi Valley State	W 88–60	5–10 (2–2)	Al Lawson Center (402); Tallahassee, FL
January 18, 2025; 4:00 pm		Arkansas–Pine Bluff	W 84–50	6–10 (3–2)	Al Lawson Center (579); Tallahassee, FL
January 23, 2025; 7:00 pm		at Jackson State	L 62–73	6–11 (3–3)	Williams Assembly Center (753); Jackson, MS
January 25, 2025; 2:00 pm		at Alcorn State	L 72–75 ^{OT}	6–12 (3–4)	Davey Whitney Complex (250); Lorman, MS
January 30, 2025; 6:30 pm		Alabama State	W 82–46	7–12 (4–4)	Al Lawson Center (400); Tallahassee, FL
February 1, 2025; 4:00 pm		Alabama A&M	L 54–58	7–13 (4–5)	Al Lawson Center (450); Tallahassee, FL
February 6, 2025; 7:00 pm		at Prairie View A&M	W 65–48	8–13 (5–5)	William Nicks Building (176); Prairie View, TX
February 8, 2025; 2:00 pm		at Texas Southern	L 70–77	8–14 (5–6)	H&PE Arena (1,807); Houston, TX
February 13, 2025; 6:30 pm		Alcorn State	L 69–74	8–15 (5–7)	Al Lawson Center (300); Tallahassee, FL
February 15, 2025; 4:00 pm		Jackson State	L 37–40	8–16 (5–8)	Al Lawson Center; Tallahassee, FL
February 20, 2025; 7:00 pm		at Alabama A&M	L 67–70	8–17 (5–9)	AAMU Events Center (1,329); Huntsville, AL
February 22, 2025; 2:00 pm		at Alabama State	W 48–40	9–17 (6–9)	Dunn–Oliver Acadome (203); Montgomery, AL
February 27, 2025; 6:30 pm		Southern	L 63–65	9–18 (6–10)	Al Lawson Center; Tallahassee, FL
March 1, 2025; 4:00 pm		Grambling State	L 52–55	9–19 (6–11)	Al Lawson Center (1,156); Tallahassee, FL
March 8, 2025; 3:00 pm		at Bethune–Cookman	L 60–71 ^{OT}	9–20 (6–12)	Moore Gymnasium (904); Daytona Beach, FL
SWAC tournament
March 11, 2025; 5:30 pm, ESPN+	(8)	vs. (9) Mississippi Valley State; First Round	L 65–68 ^{OT}	9–21	Gateway Center Arena (872); College Park, GA
*Non-conference game. ^{#}Rankings from AP Poll. (#) Tournament seedings in parentheses. All times are in Eastern.
