= 2024–25 Grambling State Tigers women's basketball team =

American college basketball season

2024–25 Grambling State Tigers women's basketball
- Conference: Southwestern Athletic Conference
- Record: 15–15 (12–6 SWAC)
- Head coach: Courtney Simmons (2nd season)
- Assistant coaches: TJ Royals; Joshua Snowden; Brandi Washington
- Home arena: Fredrick C. Hobdy Assembly Center

2024–25 SWAC women's basketball standings
	Conf.				Overall
Team	W		L	PCT	W		L	PCT
Southern †	15	–	3	.833	21	–	15	.583
Texas Southern	14	–	4	.778	17	–	16	.515
Alabama A&M	14	–	4	.778	21	–	11	.656
Jackson State	13	–	5	.722	16	–	15	.516
Grambling State	12	–	6	.667	15	–	15	.500
Alcorn State	10	–	8	.556	14	–	18	.438
Bethune–Cookman	7	–	11	.389	10	–	21	.323
Florida A&M	6	–	12	.333	9	–	21	.300
Mississippi Valley State	6	–	12	.333	8	–	23	.258
Prairie View A&M	6	–	12	.333	10	–	19	.345
Alabama State	4	–	14	.222	6	–	24	.200
Arkansas–Pine Bluff	1	–	17	.056	3	–	25	.107
† 2025 SWAC tournament winner

The 2024–25 Grambling State Tigers women's basketball team represented Grambling State University during the 2024–25 NCAA Division I women's basketball season. The Tigers, who were led by second-year head coach Courtney Simmons, played their home games at the Fredrick C. Hobdy Assembly Center in Grambling, Louisiana as members of the Southwestern Athletic Conference (SWAC).

== Previous season ==
The Tigers finished the 2023–24 season 23–10, 15–3 in SWAC play, to finish in second place. They were defeated by sixth-seeded Alcorn State in the semifinals of the SWAC tournament. They were invited to the WNIT where they lost in the second round to Louisiana–Monroe.

== Roster ==
2024–25 Grambling State Tigers women's basketball team
Players
Coaches

Pos.	#	Name	Height	Year	Previous school	Hometown
SF	0	Shaniah Nunn	6 ft 0 in (1.83 m)	Jr	Troy	Birmingham, AL
PG	1	Douthshine Prien	5 ft 7 in (1.7 m)	Sr	Pensacola State College	Boynton Beach, FL
PG	2	Sharonica Hartsfield	5 ft 5 in (1.65 m)	GS	Troy	Oklahoma City, OK
SG	3	Arianna Mosley	5 ft 9 in (1.75 m)	So	Tampa Prep	Tampa, FL
G	4	Nicole Sandifer	5 ft 10 in (1.78 m)	Fr	Magee High School	Magee, MS
SG	5	Zayla Tinner	5 ft 10 in (1.78 m)	Sr	Northwest Florida State College	Amarillo, TX
F	8	Alyssa Phillip	6 ft 0 in (1.83 m)	Sr	Georgia State	Woodstock, GA
G	10	Claire Simmons	5 ft 10 in (1.78 m)	Sr	Chicago State	Louisville, KY
PG	12	Kahia Warmsley	5 ft 8 in (1.73 m)	Sr	Tulane	Shreveport, LA
SF	15	Zaria Johnson	6 ft 1 in (1.85 m)	Jr	Georgia Southern	Houston, TX
F	20	Ja'Miyah Bryant	6 ft 1 in (1.85 m)	Sr	Hofstra	Pensacola, FL
SG	23	Halima Salat	5 ft 5 in (1.65 m)	Sr	Old Dominion	Amarillo, TX
SF	24	Lillian Jackson	5 ft 11 in (1.8 m)	Jr	Tyler Junior College	Little Rock, AR
C	55	Lydia Freeman	6 ft 5 in (1.96 m)	GS	Georgia Southern	Atlanta, GA

Head coach

- Courtney Simmons (Louisville)

Assistant coach(es)

- TJ Royals (Texas Southern)
- Joshua Snowden (Troy)
- Brandi Washington (Grambling State)

Legend

- (C) Team captain
- (S) Suspended
- (I) Ineligible
- (W) Walk-on
- Injured
- Current redshirt

Roster
Last update: November 19, 2024

== Schedule and results ==
Date time, TV	Rank^{#}	Opponent^{#}	Result	Record	Site (attendance) city, state
Non-conference regular season
November 4, 2024*; 6:00 p.m.		Centenary (Louisiana)	W 131–30	1–0	Fredrick C. Hobdy Assembly Center (1,005); Grambling, LA
November 9, 2024*; 12:30 p.m.		at Xavier New Orleans	W 69–55	2–0	Convocation Center (712); New Orleans, LA
November 13, 2024*; 12:00 p.m.		at Nicholls	L 61–76	2–1	Stopher Gym (465); Thibodaux, LA
November 16, 2024*; 2:00 p.m., ESPN+		at Tulane	L 65–89	2–2	Devlin Fieldhouse (532); New Orleans, LA
November 20, 2024*; 9:00 p.m., ESPN+/ACCNX		at California	L 63–86	2–3	Haas Pavilion (1,153); Berkeley, CA
November 23, 2024*; 7:00 p.m., ESPN+		at Arizona	L 60–84	2–4	McKale Center (7,609); Tucson, AZ
December 3, 2024*; 1:00 p.m., ESPN+		at Oregon State	L 56–63	2–5	Gill Coliseum (7,881); Corvallis, OR
December 5, 2024*; 11:00 a.m., ESPN+		at Tulsa	L 60–77	2–6	Reynolds Center (3,067); Tulsa, OK
December 8, 2024*; 2:00 p.m.		vs. No. 5 LSU	L 54–100	2–7	Brookshire Grocery Arena (8,299); Bossier City, LA
December 12, 2024*; 7:00 p.m., ACCNX		at Louisville	L 57–96	2–8	KFC Yum! Center (7,395); Louisville, KY
December 18, 2024*; 12:00 p.m., YouTube		Arkansas Baptist	W 94–52	3–8	Fredrick C. Hobdy Assembly Center (203); Grambling, LA
SWAC regular season
January 2, 2025; 6:00 p.m.		at Texas Southern	L 74–85	3–9 (0–1)	H&PE Arena (317); Houston, TX
January 4, 2025; 2:00 p.m.		at Prairie View A&M	W 64–44	4–9 (1–1)	William Nicks Building (148); Prairie View, TX
January 11, 2025; 2:00 p.m.		Bethune–Cookman	L 52–70	4–10 (1–2)	Fredrick C. Hobdy Assembly Center (687); Grambling, LA
January 13, 2025; 6:30 p.m.		Florida A&M	W 78–64	5–10 (2–2)	Fredrick C. Hobdy Assembly Center (1,095); Grambling, LA
January 18, 2025; 3:00 p.m.		at Southern	L 53–59	5–11 (2–3)	F. G. Clark Center (4,124); Baton Rouge, LA
January 23, 2025; 6:00 p.m.		at Arkansas–Pine Bluff	W 64–57	6–11 (3–3)	H.O. Clemmons Arena (647); Pine Bluff, AR
January 25, 2025; 4:00 p.m.		at Mississippi Valley State	W 69–62	7–11 (4–3)	Harrison HPER Complex (1,523); Itta Bena, MS
January 30, 2025; 6:30 p.m.		Alcorn State	W 82–69	8–11 (5–3)	Fredrick C. Hobdy Assembly Center (754); Grambling, LA
February 1, 2025; 2:00 p.m.		Jackson State	L 56–67	8–12 (5–4)	Fredrick C. Hobdy Assembly Center (2,500); Grambling, LA
February 6, 2025; 6:00 p.m.		at Alabama A&M	L 58–70	8–13 (5–5)	Alabama A&M Events Center (1,109); Huntsville, AL
February 8, 2025; 1:00 p.m.		at Alabama State	W 70–61	9–13 (6–5)	Dunn–Oliver Acadome (250); Montgomery, AL
February 13, 2025; 6:30 p.m.		Prairie View A&M	W 75–54	10–13 (7–5)	Fredrick C. Hobdy Assembly Center (577); Grambling, LA
February 15, 2025; 2:00 p.m.		Texas Southern	W 71–46	11–13 (8–5)	Fredrick C. Hobdy Assembly Center (1,015); Grambling, LA
February 22, 2025; 2:00 p.m.		Southern	L 47–70	11–14 (8–6)	Fredrick C. Hobdy Assembly Center (1,506); Grambling, LA
February 27, 2025; 6:00 p.m.		at Bethune–Cookman	W 71–59	12–14 (9–6)	Moore Gymnasium (481); Daytona Beach, FL
March 1, 2025; 2:00 p.m.		at Florida A&M	W 55–52	13–14 (10–6)	Al Lawson Center (1,156); Tallahassee, FL
March 6, 2025; 6:30 p.m.		Alabama A&M	W 77–65	14–14 (11–6)	Fredrick C. Hobdy Assembly Center (1,400); Grambling, LA
March 8, 2025; 2:00 p.m.		Alabama State	W 69–53	15–14 (12–6)	Fredrick C. Hobdy Assembly Center (985); Grambling, LA
SWAC tournament
March 13, 2025; 11:00 a.m., ESPN+	(5)	vs. (4) Jackson State; Quarterfinals	L 47–57	15–15	Gateway Center Arena (724); Atlanta, GA
*Non-conference game. ^{#}Rankings from AP poll. (#) Tournament seedings in parentheses. All times are in Central.
