= 2024–25 Jackson State Lady Tigers basketball team =

American college basketball season

2024–25 Jackson State Lady Tigers basketball
- Conference: Southwestern Athletic Conference
- Record: 16–15 (13–5 SWAC)
- Head coach: Margaret Richards (1st season)
- Assistant coaches: Dylan Howard; Alexus Holt; Jonathan Williams
- Home arena: Williams Assembly Center

2024–25 SWAC women's basketball standings
| | Conf. | | | | Overall |
| Team | W | | L | PCT | W | | L | PCT |
|---|---|---|---|---|---|---|---|---|
| Southern † | 15 | – | 3 | .833 | 21 | – | 15 | .583 |
| Texas Southern | 14 | – | 4 | .778 | 17 | – | 16 | .515 |
| Alabama A&M | 14 | – | 4 | .778 | 21 | – | 11 | .656 |
| Jackson State | 13 | – | 5 | .722 | 16 | – | 15 | .516 |
| Grambling State | 12 | – | 6 | .667 | 15 | – | 15 | .500 |
| Alcorn State | 10 | – | 8 | .556 | 14 | – | 18 | .438 |
| Bethune–Cookman | 7 | – | 11 | .389 | 10 | – | 21 | .323 |
| Florida A&M | 6 | – | 12 | .333 | 9 | – | 21 | .300 |
| Mississippi Valley State | 6 | – | 12 | .333 | 8 | – | 23 | .258 |
| Prairie View A&M | 6 | – | 12 | .333 | 10 | – | 19 | .345 |
| Alabama State | 4 | – | 14 | .222 | 6 | – | 24 | .200 |
| Arkansas–Pine Bluff | 1 | – | 17 | .056 | 3 | – | 25 | .107 |
† 2025 SWAC tournament winner

The 2024–25 Jackson State Lady Tigers basketball team represented Jackson State University during the 2024–25 NCAA Division I women's basketball season. The Lady Tigers, led by first-year head coach Margaret Richards, played their home games at the Williams Assembly Center as members of the Southwestern Athletic Conference (SWAC).

== Previous season ==
The Lady Tigers finished the 2023–24 season 26–7, 18–0 in SWAC play, to win the SWAC regular season championship. As a No. 1 seed in the WAC tournament, they defeated Prairie View A&M, Arkansas–Pine Bluff and Alcorn State to win the SWAC tournament. As a result, they received an automatic bid to the NCAA touruament as a No. 14 seed in the Portland Regional 3, where they lost in the first round to UConn.

Reed left Jackson State on April 25, 2024, after six seasons for the head coaching job at Charlotte. Former Alabama A&M head coach Richards was hired as the Lady Tigers' new head coach on May 1, less than a month after being named assistant coach at Mercer.

== Preseason ==
On September 19, 2024, the SWAC released their preseason coaches poll. Jackson State was picked to finish fourth in the SWAC regular season.

=== Preseason rankings ===
SWAC preseason poll
| Predicted finish | Team | Votes (1st place) |
|---|---|---|
| 1 | Grambling State | 276 (10) |
| 2 | Southern | 232 (2) |
| 3 | Alabama A&M | 226 (4) |
| 4 | Jackson State | 211 (4) |
| 5 | Florida A&M | 178 (3) |
| 6 | Prairie View A&M | 165 (1) |
| 7 | Alcorn State | 157 |
| 8 | Bethune–Cookman | 142 |
| 9 | Texas Southern | 117 |
| 10 | Alabama State | 114 |
| 11 | Arkansas–Pine Bluff | 86 |
| 12 | Mississippi Valley State | 46 |

=== Preseason All-SWAC Teams ===
No Lady Tigers were named to the first or second Preseason All-SWAC teams.

== Roster ==
2024–25 Jackson State Tigers women's basketball team
Players
Coaches

| Pos. | # | Name | Height | Year | Previous school | Hometown |
|---|---|---|---|---|---|---|
| G | 3 | Taleah Dilworth | 5 ft 8 in (1.73 m) | Sr | Lutheran North HS; Kentucky State | St. Louis, MO |
| G | 4 | Zaria Glover | 5 ft 10 in (1.78 m) | Jr | Durango HS; Northwest Mississippi CC | Las Vegas, NV |
| G | 5 | Jaileyah Cotton | 5 ft 6 in (1.68 m) | Jr | Bardstown HS; East Tennessee State | Bardstown, KY |
| G | 10 | Diaka Berete | 5 ft 9 in (1.75 m) | Sr | USAO | Toronto, ON |
| G | 11 | Tierney Kelsey | 5 ft 6 in (1.68 m) | Fr | Whitehaven HS | Memphis, TN |
| G | 14 | Arianna Durrell | 5 ft 4 in (1.63 m) | Jr | Clinton HS; Itawamba CC | Clinton, MS |
| G/F | 22 | Leianya Massenat | 5 ft 9 in (1.75 m) | GS | Trenton Central HS; Georgia Southwestern State | Trenton, NJ |
| C | 24 | Ruthie Mbugua | 6 ft 4 in (1.93 m) | RS Jr | Danville Christian Academy; Carson–Newman | Nairobi, Kenya |
| F | 30 | Zoe Cooper | 5 ft 11 in (1.8 m) | GS | Ramsey HS; New Orleans | Birmingham, AL |
| F | 33 | Amaya Barnes | 5 ft 11 in (1.8 m) | So | Metropolitan CC | Lee's Summit, MO |
| C | 34 | Joy Dau | 6 ft 3 in (1.91 m) | Fr | Richard Montgomery HS | Rockville, MD |
| C | 35 | Jakiylah Esco | 6 ft 1 in (1.85 m) | Sr | Ridgeland HS | Ridgeland, MS |
| C | 44 | Shalance Montoya | 6 ft 1 in (1.85 m) | Sr | Carlsbad HS; Eastern Arizona College | Carlsbad, NM |

Head coach

- Margaret Richards (Nebraska)

Assistant coach(es)

- Dylan Howard (UAB)
- Alexus Holt (Copah-Lincoln CC)
- Patrick Richardson (Alabama A&M)

Legend

- (C) Team captain
- (S) Suspended
- (I) Ineligible
- (W) Walk-on
- Injured
- Current redshirt

Roster
Last update: June 4, 2025

== Schedule ==
| Date time, TV | Rank^{#} | Opponent^{#} | Result | Record | Site (attendance) city, state |
Exhibition
| October 26, 2024*; 2:00 p.m. | | MUW | W 93–39 | | Williams Assembly Center; Jackson, MS |
Non-conference regular season
| November 4, 2024*; 1:30 p.m., ACCNX/ESPN+ | | at Clemson | L 44–78 | 0–1 | Littlejohn Coliseum (783); Clemson, SC |
| November 9, 2024*; 1:00 p.m., ESPN+ | | at East Tennessee State | W 55–48 | 1–1 | Brooks Gymnasium (578); Johnson City, TN |
| November 14, 2024*; 7:00 p.m., ESPN+ | | at Tennessee Tech | L 56–84 | 1–2 | Hooper Eblen Center (626); Cookeville, TN |
| November 18, 2024*; 11:00 a.m., SECN+/ESPN+ | | at No. 17 Ole Miss | L 44–76 | 1–3 | SJB Pavilion (8,653); Oxford, MS |
| November 24, 2024*; 2:00 p.m., ESPN+ | | at Tulane | L 37–77 | 1–4 | Devlin Fieldhouse (675); New Orleans, LA |
| November 29, 2024*; 11:00 a.m. | | vs. Bellarmine; Spartan Shootout | L 59–67 | 1–5 | G. B. Hodge Center (117); Spartanburg, SC |
| November 30, 2024*; 11:00 a.m. | | vs. Morehead State; Spartan Shootout | L 57–87 | 1–6 | G. B. Hodge Center (117); Spartanburg, SC |
| December 7, 2024*; 2:00 p.m., ESPN+ | | at Arkansas State | L 65–76 | 1–7 | First National Bank Arena (563); Jonesboro, AR |
| December 11, 2024*; 7:00 p.m., B1G+ | | at Minnesota | L 43–81 | 1–8 | Williams Arena (2,812); Minneapolis, MN |
| December 19, 2024*; 6:00 p.m., ESPN+ | | at Mercer | W 66–54 | 2–8 | Hawkins Arena (419); Macon, GA |
| December 29, 2024*; 2:00 p.m., SECN+/ESPN+ | | at Missouri | L 51–90 | 2–9 | Mizzou Arena (2,986); Columbia, MO |
SWAC regular season
| January 4, 2025; 12:00 p.m., HBCU GO Sports | | at Alcorn State | W 67–64 | 3–9 (1–0) | Davey Whitney Complex (977); Lorman, MS |
| January 9, 2025; 5:00 p.m. | | Alabama A&M | W 65–55 | 4–9 (2–0) | Williams Assembly Center (523); Jackson, MS |
| January 11, 2025; 1:00 p.m., SWAC DN | | Alabama State | W 74–44 | 5–9 (3–0) | Williams Assembly Center (695); Jackson, MS |
| January 16, 2025; 6:00 p.m. | | at Texas Southern | L 54–69 | 5–10 (3–1) | H&PE Arena (927); Houston, TX |
| January 18, 2025; 2:00 p.m. | | at Prairie View A&M | W 67–48 | 6–10 (4–1) | William Nicks Building (113); Prairie View, TX |
| January 23, 2025; 6:00 p.m. | | Florida A&M | W 73–62 | 7–10 (5–1) | Williams Assembly Center (753); Jackson, MS |
| January 25, 2025; 1:00 p.m., SWAC DN | | Bethune–Cookman | W 64–47 | 8–10 (6–1) | Williams Assembly Center (927); Jackson, MS |
| January 30, 2025; 1:00 p.m. | | at Southern | L 47–64 | 8–11 (6–2) | F. G. Clark Center (2,687); Baton Rouge, LA |
| February 1, 2025; 1:00 p.m., SWAC DN | | at Southern | W 67–56 | 9–11 (7–2) | Fredrick C. Hobdy Assembly Center (2,500); Grambling, LA |
| February 6, 2025; 6:00 p.m. | | Arkansas–Pine Bluff | W 76–60 | 10–11 (8–2) | Williams Assembly Center (498); Jackson, MS |
| February 8, 2025; 1:00 p.m., SWAC DN | | Mississippi Valley State | W 76–63 | 11–11 (9–2) | Williams Assembly Center (894); Jackson, MS |
| February 13, 2025; 6:00 p.m. | | at Bethune–Cookman | W 59–53 | 12–11 (10–2) | Moore Gymnasium (457); Daytona Beach, FL |
| February 15, 2025; 3:00 p.m. | | at Florida A&M | W 40–37 | 13–11 (11–2) | Al Lawson Center; Tallahassee, FL |
| February 22, 2025; 1:00 p.m. | | Alcorn State | L 51–64 | 13–12 (11–3) | Williams Assembly Center (1,646); Jackson, MS |
| February 27, 2025; 6:00 p.m. | | Alcorn State | L 63–71 | 13–13 (11–4) | Williams Assembly Center (368); Jackson, MS |
| March 1, 2025; 2:00 p.m., SWAC DN | | Texas Southern | W 63–60 | 14–13 (12–4) | Williams Assembly Center (961); Jackson, MS |
| March 6, 2025; 5:00 p.m., SWAC DN | | at Arkansas–Pine Bluff | W 74–65 | 15–13 (13–4) | H.O. Clemmons Arena (762); Pine Bluff, AR |
| March 8, 2025; 12:00 p.m., HBCU GO Sports | | at Mississippi Valley State | L 68–70 | 15–14 (13–5) | Harrison HPER Complex (3,485); Itta Bena, MS |
SWAC women's tournament
| March 13, 2025; 11:00 a.m., ESPN+ | (4) | vs. (5) Grambling State; Quarterfinals | W 57–47 | 16–14 | Gateway Center Arena (724); College Park, GA |
| March 14, 2025; 4:30 p.m., ESPN+ | (4) | vs. (1) Southern; Semifinals | L 47–51 | 16–15 | Gateway Center Arena (1,872); College Park, GA |
*Non-conference game. ^{#}Rankings from AP poll. (#) Tournament seedings in parentheses. All times are in Central.

== See also ==
- 2024–25 Jackson State Tigers basketball team
