= 2024–25 Alcorn State Lady Braves basketball team =

American college basketball season

2024–25 Alcorn State Lady Braves basketball
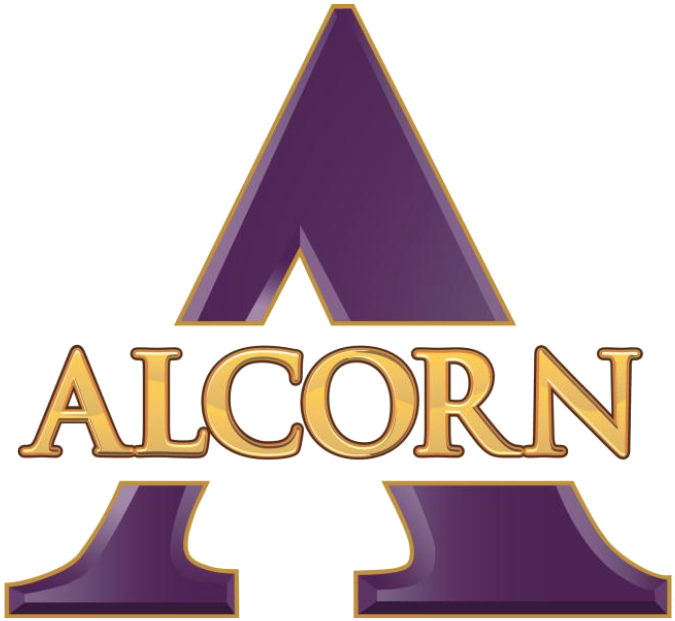
- Conference: Southwestern Athletic Conference
- Record: 14–18 (10–8 SWAC)
- Head coach: Nate Kilbert (5th season)
- Assistant coaches: Elvis Robinson; Lisa Powell; Joncyee Sanders
- Home arena: Davey Whitney Complex

2024–25 SWAC women's basketball standings
| | Conf. | | | | Overall |
| Team | W | | L | PCT | W | | L | PCT |
|---|---|---|---|---|---|---|---|---|
| Southern † | 15 | – | 3 | .833 | 21 | – | 15 | .583 |
| Texas Southern | 14 | – | 4 | .778 | 17 | – | 16 | .515 |
| Alabama A&M | 14 | – | 4 | .778 | 21 | – | 11 | .656 |
| Jackson State | 13 | – | 5 | .722 | 16 | – | 15 | .516 |
| Grambling State | 12 | – | 6 | .667 | 15 | – | 15 | .500 |
| Alcorn State | 10 | – | 8 | .556 | 14 | – | 18 | .438 |
| Bethune–Cookman | 7 | – | 11 | .389 | 10 | – | 21 | .323 |
| Florida A&M | 6 | – | 12 | .333 | 9 | – | 21 | .300 |
| Mississippi Valley State | 6 | – | 12 | .333 | 8 | – | 23 | .258 |
| Prairie View A&M | 6 | – | 12 | .333 | 10 | – | 19 | .345 |
| Alabama State | 4 | – | 14 | .222 | 6 | – | 24 | .200 |
| Arkansas–Pine Bluff | 1 | – | 17 | .056 | 3 | – | 25 | .107 |
† 2025 SWAC tournament winner

The 2024–25 Alcorn State Lady Braves basketball team represented Alcorn State University during the 2024–25 NCAA Division I women's basketball season. The Lady Braves, who were led by fifth-year head coach Nate Kilbert, played their home games at the Davey Whitney Complex in Lorman, Mississippi as members of the Southwestern Athletic Conference (SWAC).

== Previous season ==
The Lady Braves finished the 2023–24 season 12–20, 8–10 in SWAC play, to finish in a tie for sixth place. They upset Southern, and Grambling State before falling to top-seeded Jackson State in the SWAC tournament championship game.

== Preseason ==
On September 19, 2024, the SWAC released their preseason coaches poll. Alcorn State was picked to finish seventh in the SWAC.

=== Preseason rankings ===
SWAC preseason poll
| Predicted finish | Team | Votes (1st place) |
|---|---|---|
| 1 | Grambling State | 276 (10) |
| 2 | Southern | 232 (2) |
| 3 | Alabama A&M | 226 (4) |
| 4 | Jackson State | 211 (4) |
| 5 | Florida A&M | 178 (3) |
| 6 | Prairie View A&M | 165 (1) |
| 7 | Alcorn State | 157 |
| 8 | Bethune–Cookman | 142 |
| 9 | Texas Southern | 117 |
| 10 | Alabama State | 114 |
| 11 | Arkansas–Pine Bluff | 86 |
| 12 | Mississippi Valley State | 46 |

=== Preseason Offensive Player of the Year ===
Preseason Offensive Player of the Year
| Player | Position | Year |
|---|---|---|
| Destiny Brown | Forward | Senior |

=== Preseason All-SWAC Teams ===
Preseason All-SWAC Teams
| Team | Player | Position | Year |
|---|---|---|---|
| First | Destiny Brown | Forward | Senior |
| Second | Zy'Nyia White | Guard | Senior |

== Roster ==
2024–25 Alcorn State Lady Braves women's basketball team
Players
Coaches

| Pos. | # | Name | Height | Year | Previous school | Hometown |
|---|---|---|---|---|---|---|
| G | 0 | Zy'Nyia White | 5 ft 6 in (1.68 m) | Sr | Hazlehurst High School | Hazlehurst, Mississippi |
| G | 1 | Ashanti Backus | 5 ft 4 in (1.63 m) | Sr | Coahoma Community College | Little Rock, Arkansas |
| G/F | 2 | Nakia Cheatman | 6 ft 0 in (1.83 m) | Sr | Coahoma Community College | Clarksdale, Mississippi |
| G | 3 | Jayda Bowen | 5 ft 7 in (1.7 m) | Jr | Prairie View A&M | Chicago, Illinois |
| G | 4 | Kailyn Watkins | 5 ft 6 in (1.68 m) | GS | Crenshaw High School | Inglewood, California |
| F | 5 | Destiny Brown | 6 ft 3 in (1.91 m) | Sr | College of Southern Nevada | Los Angeles, California |
| G | 10 | Dalayja Hurt-Floyd | 5 ft 7 in (1.7 m) | So | Cal Poly Pomona | Compton, California |
| F | 11 | Leyah Houston | 6 ft 0 in (1.83 m) | So | Santa Fe College | Gainesville, Florida |
| F | 14 | Arene Iyekekpolor | 6 ft 0 in (1.83 m) | So | Harry Ainlay High School | Edmonton, Alberta |
| G | 15 | Jeanee Anderson | 5 ft 7 in (1.7 m) | Sr | Coahoma Community College | Greenville, Mississippi |
| G/F | 20 | Sharmanye Finley | 5 ft 10 in (1.78 m) | GS | Adams State | Las Vegas, Nevada |
| G/F | 24 | Kiarra Henderson | 5 ft 9 in (1.75 m) | Sr | Colby Community College | Fort Worth, Texas |
| G | 30 | Maya Hunkin-Claytor | 5 ft 7 in (1.7 m) | Sr | Kahuku High & Intermediate School | Wahiawa, Hawaii |
| F | 32 | Milaan Moore | 6 ft 2 in (1.88 m) | Fr | Kenwood Academy | Chicago, Illinois |

Head coach

- Nate Kilbert (Mississippi Valley State)

Assistant coach(es)

- Elvis Robinson (Mississippi Valley State)
- Lisa Powell (Alcorn State)
- Joncyee Sanders (Mississippi Valley State)

Legend

- (C) Team captain
- (S) Suspended
- (I) Ineligible
- (W) Walk-on
- Injured
- Current redshirt

Roster
Last update: June 11, 2025

== Schedule and results ==
| Date time, TV | Rank^{#} | Opponent^{#} | Result | Record | Site (attendance) city, state |
Non-conference regular season
| November 4, 2024*; 6:00 pm, ESPN+ | | at North Texas | L 65–84 | 0–1 | The Super Pit (1,513); Denton, TX |
| November 6, 2024*; 6:00 pm | | MUW | W 106–56 | 1–1 | Davey Whitney Complex (150); Lorman, MS |
| November 10, 2024*; 4:30 pm, SECN+ | | at Mississippi State | L 45–73 | 1–2 | Humphrey Coliseum (4,504); Starkville, MS |
| November 14, 2024*; 6:00 pm, SECN+ | | at No. 22 Alabama | L 59–88 | 1–3 | Coleman Coliseum (2,435); Tuscaloosa, AL |
| November 17, 2024*; 2:00 pm, ESPN+ | | at Middle Tennessee | L 48–80 | 1–4 | Murphy Center (3,602); Murfreesboro, TN |
| November 19, 2024*; 6:30 pm, ESPN+ | | at Nicholls | L 55–74 | 1–5 | Stopher Gymnasium (256); Thibodaux, LA |
| November 21, 2024*; 7:00 pm, ESPN+ | | at Houston | L 48–73 | 1–6 | Fertitta Center (606); Houston, TX |
| December 2, 2024*; 2:00 pm | | Arkansas Baptist | W 71–47 | 2–6 | Davey Whitney Complex (65); Lorman, MS |
| December 7, 2024*; 3:00 pm, ESPN+ | | at Louisiana Tech | L 45–79 | 2–7 | Thomas Assembly Center (958); Ruston, LA |
| December 15, 2024*; 1:00 pm, ESPN+ | | at UAB | L 51–76 | 2–8 | Bartow Arena (287); Birmingham, AL |
| December 30, 2024*; 6:30 pm, SECN+ | | at No. 25 Ole Miss | L 41–93 | 2–9 | SJB Pavilion (2,896); Oxford, MS |
SWAC regular season
| January 4, 2025; 12:00 pm | | Jackson State | L 64–67 | 2–10 (0–1) | Davey Whitney Complex (977); Lorman, MS |
| January 9, 2025; 2:00 pm | | Alabama State | W 61–54 | 3–10 (1–1) | Davey Whitney Complex (61); Lorman, MS |
| January 11, 2025; 1:00 pm | | Alabama A&M | L 56–66 | 3–11 (1–2) | Davey Whitney Complex (121); Lorman, MS |
| January 16, 2025; 6:00 pm | | at Prairie View A&M | L 52–62 | 3–12 (1–3) | William Nicks Building; Prairie View, TX |
| January 18, 2025; 3:00 pm | | at Texas Southern | L 48–70 | 3–13 (1–4) | H&PE Arena (678); Houston, TX |
| January 25, 2025; 1:00 pm | | Florida A&M | W 75–72 ^{OT} | 4–13 (2–4) | Davey Whitney Complex (250); Lorman, MS |
| January 27, 2025; 3:00 pm | | Bethune–Cookman | W 68–58 | 5–13 (3–4) | Davey Whitney Complex (95); Lorman, MS |
| January 30, 2025; 6:30 pm | | at Grambling State | L 69–82 | 5–14 (3–5) | Fredrick C. Hobdy Assembly Center (754); Grambling, LA |
| February 1, 2025; 2:30 pm | | at Southern | W 59–55 ^{OT} | 6–14 (4–5) | F. G. Clark Center (2,189); Baton Rouge, LA |
| February 6, 2025; 6:00 pm | | Mississippi Valley State | L 59–63 | 6–15 (4–6) | Davey Whitney Complex (125); Lorman, MS |
| February 8, 2025; 1:00 pm | | Arkansas–Pine Bluff | W 53–40 | 7–15 (5–6) | Davey Whitney Complex (200); Lorman, MS |
| February 13, 2025; 5:30 pm | | at Florida A&M | W 74–69 | 8–15 (6–6) | Al Lawson Center (300); Tallahassee, FL |
| February 15, 2025; 2:00 pm | | at Bethune–Cookman | L 52–65 | 8–16 (6–7) | Moore Gymnasium (516); Daytona Beach, FL |
| February 22, 2025; 1:00 pm | | at Jackson State | W 64–51 | 9–16 (7–7) | Williams Assembly Center (1,646); Jackson, MS |
| February 27, 2025; 6:00 pm | | Texas Southern | W 60–52 | 10–16 (8–7) | Davey Whitney Complex (203); Lorman, MS |
| March 1, 2025; 1:00 pm | | Prairie View A&M | W 61–39 | 11–16 (9–7) | Davey Whitney Complex (150); Lorman, MS |
| March 6, 2025; 5:30 pm | | at Mississippi Valley State | L 63–72 | 11–17 (9–8) | Harrison HPER Complex (1,291); Itta Bena, MS |
| March 8, 2025; 3:00 pm | | at Arkansas–Pine Bluff | W 70–59 | 12–17 (10–8) | H.O. Clemmons Arena (1,380); Pine Bluff, AR |
SWAC tournament
| March 13, 2025; 10:00 am, ESPN+ | (6) | vs. (3) Alabama A&M; Quarterfinals | W 56–53 | 13–17 | Gateway Center Arena (641); College Park, GA |
| March 14, 2025; 10:00 am, ESPN+ | (6) | vs. (2) Texas Southern; Semifinals | W 65–55 | 14–17 | Gateway Center Arena (407); College Park, GA |
| March 15, 2025; 4:30 pm, ESPN+ | (6) | vs. (1) Southern; Championship | L 44–64 | 14–18 | Gateway Center Arena (1,562); College Park, GA |
*Non-conference game. ^{#}Rankings from AP Poll. (#) Tournament seedings in parentheses. All times are in Central.
