= 2024–25 Texas Southern Lady Tigers basketball team =

American college basketball season

2024–25 Texas Southern Lady Tigers basketball
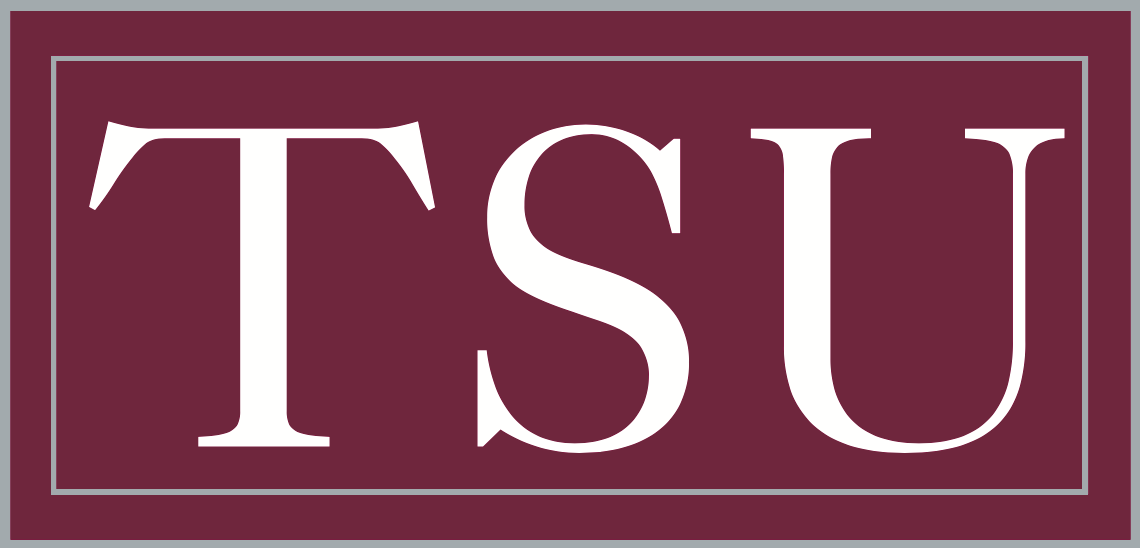

WNIT, Second Round
- Conference: Southwestern Athletic Conference
- Record: 17–16 (14–4 SWAC)
- Head coach: Vernette Skeete (3rd season)
- Assistant coaches: Richard Jowers; Michael Davis Jr.; Rob Marble
- Home arena: Health and Physical Education Arena

2024–25 SWAC women's basketball standings
	Conf.				Overall
Team	W		L	PCT	W		L	PCT
Southern †	15	–	3	.833	21	–	15	.583
Texas Southern	14	–	4	.778	17	–	16	.515
Alabama A&M	14	–	4	.778	21	–	11	.656
Jackson State	13	–	5	.722	16	–	15	.516
Grambling State	12	–	6	.667	15	–	15	.500
Alcorn State	10	–	8	.556	14	–	18	.438
Bethune–Cookman	7	–	11	.389	10	–	21	.323
Florida A&M	6	–	12	.333	9	–	21	.300
Mississippi Valley State	6	–	12	.333	8	–	23	.258
Prairie View A&M	6	–	12	.333	10	–	19	.345
Alabama State	4	–	14	.222	6	–	24	.200
Arkansas–Pine Bluff	1	–	17	.056	3	–	25	.107
† 2025 SWAC tournament winner

The 2024–25 Texas Southern Lady Tigers basketball team represented Texas Southern University during the 2024–25 NCAA Division I women's basketball season. The Lady Tigers, who were led by third-year head coach Vernette Skeete, played their home games at the Health and Physical Education Arena located in Houston, Texas, as members of the Southwestern Athletic Conference (SWAC).

== Previous season ==
The Lady Tigers finished the 2023–24 season 7–22, 5–12 in SWAC play, to finish in a tie for ninth place. Since only the top eight teams qualify for the SWAC tournament, the Lady Tigers failed to qualify.

== Preseason ==
On September 19, 2024, the SWAC released their preseason coaches poll. Texas Southern was picked to finish ninth in the SWAC regular season.

=== Preseason rankings ===
SWAC preseason poll
Predicted finish	Team	Votes (1st place)
1	Grambling State	276 (10)
2	Southern	232 (2)
3	Alabama A&M	226 (4)
4	Jackson State	211 (4)
5	Florida A&M	178 (3)
6	Prairie View A&M	165 (1)
7	Alcorn State	157
8	Bethune–Cookman	142
9	Texas Southern	117
10	Alabama State	114
11	Arkansas–Pine Bluff	86
12	Mississippi Valley State	46

=== Preseason All-SWAC Teams ===
One Lady Tiger were named to the first Preseason All-SWAC teams.

Preseason All-MEAC Teams
Team	Player	Position	Year
Second	Jaida Belton	Forward-Center	Junior

== Roster ==
2024–25 Texas Southern Lady Tigers women's basketball team
Players
Coaches

Pos.	#	Name	Height	Year	Previous school	Hometown
G	2	Daeja Holmes	5 ft 9 in (1.75 m)	Sr	Fresno City College	Fresno, CA
G	3	Aaliyah Henderson	5 ft 7 in (1.7 m)	So	SMU	Norman, OK
G	4	Nya Harmon	5 ft 7 in (1.7 m)	Sr	Texas A&M–Commerce	Dallas, TX
F/C	5	Jaida Belton	6 ft 4 in (1.93 m)	Jr	New Hope Academy	Baltimore, MD
F	8	Deivejon Harris	6 ft 3 in (1.91 m)	Jr	SUNY Sullivan	Bronx, NY
G	10	Maci Quiller	5 ft 11 in (1.8 m)	So	Hendrickson High School	Pflugerville, TX
G	11	Tianna Mathis	5 ft 8 in (1.73 m)	Jr	Blinn College	Bryan, TX
G	12	Aylasia Fantroy	5 ft 11 in (1.8 m)	So	Ohio	Palestine, TX
G	15	Alisa Knight	5 ft 11 in (1.8 m)	Sr	Cedar Park High School	Cedar Park, TX
F	21	Treasure Thompson	6 ft 2 in (1.88 m)	Sr	Eastern Michigan	Joliet, IL
G	22	Courtlyn Loudermill	5 ft 8 in (1.73 m)	GS	North Texas	Dallas, TX
G	23	Mikayla Malik	6 ft 1 in (1.85 m)	GS	Tuskegee	Houston, TX
G	24	Anela Thomas	5 ft 8 in (1.73 m)	Jr	Saint Mary's	Oakland, CA

Head coach

- Vernette Skeete (Alcorn State)

Assistant coach(es)

- Richard Jowers (Elizabeth City State)
- Michael Davis Jr. (UAB)
- Rob Marble (Texas Southern)

Legend

- (C) Team captain
- (S) Suspended
- (I) Ineligible
- (W) Walk-on
- Injured
- Current redshirt

Roster
Last update: November 12, 2024

== Schedule and results ==
Date time, TV	Rank^{#}	Opponent^{#}	Result	Record	Site (attendance) city, state
Non-conference regular season
November 4, 2024*; 5:00 p.m., ESPN+		at Stephen F. Austin	L 45–86	0–1	William R. Johnson Coliseum (983); Nacogdoches, TX
November 7, 2024*; 5:30 p.m., ESPN+		at North Texas	L 54–78	0–2	The Super Pit (1,643); Denton, TX
November 11, 2024*; 6:30 p.m., ESPN+		at Oklahoma State	L 57–87	0–3	Gallagher-Iba Arena (1,675); Stillwater, OK
November 21, 2024*; 4:00 p.m., YouTube		East Texas A&M	L 86–87	0–4	H&PE Arena (373); Houston, TX
November 26, 2024*; 1:00 p.m.		College of Biblical Studies	W 119–27	1–4	H&PE Arena (272); Houston, TX
December 4, 2024*; 7:00 p.m., ESPN+		at Baylor	L 29–101	1–5	Foster Pavilion (3,121); Waco, TX
December 7, 2024*; 1:00 p.m.		UCF	L 87–93	1–6	H&PE Arena (272); Houston, TX
December 13, 2024*; 11:15 a.m., ESPN+		at Rice	L 62–89	1–7	Tudor Fieldhouse (1,599); Houston, TX
December 16, 2024*; 7:00 p.m., ESPN+		at Texas A&M	L 60–85	1–8	Reed Arena (2,977); College Station, TX
December 19, 2024*; 3:00 p.m., ESPN+		at California Baptist	L 58–72	1–9	Fowler Events Center (181); Riverside, CA
December 29, 2024*; 2:00 p.m., ESPN+		at Tarleton State	L 55–67	1–10	Wisdom Gym (627); Stephenville, TX
SWAC regular season
January 2, 2025; 6:00 p.m.		Grambling State	W 85-74	2-10 (1-0)	H&PE Arena (317); Houston, TX
January 4, 2025; 3:00 p.m.		Southern	W 55-51	3-10 (2-0)	H&PE Arena (663); Houston, TX
January 9, 2025; 6:00 p.m.		at Mississippi Valley State	W 80-54	4-10 (3-0)	Harrison HPER Complex (980); Itta Bena, MS
January 16, 2025; 6:00 p.m.		Jackson State	W 69-54	5-10 (4-0)	H&PE Arena (927); Houston, TX
January 18, 2025; 3:00 p.m.		Alcorn State	W 70-48	6-10 (5-0)	H&PE Arena (678); Houston, TX
January 25, 2025; 2:00 p.m.		at Alabama A&M	W 75-65	7-10 (6-0)	Alabama A&M Events Center (1,017); Huntsville, AL
January 27, 2025; 5:30 p.m.		at Alabama State	W 69-67	8-10 (7-0)	Dunn–Oliver Acadome (655); Montgomery, AL
February 1, 2025; 3:00 p.m., HBCU GO Sports		Prairie View A&M	W 82-69	9-10 (8-0)	H&PE Arena (3,017); Houston, TX
February 4, 2025; 3:00 p.m.		at Arkansas–Pine Bluff	W 75-65	10-10 (9-0)	H.O. Clemmons Arena (648); Pine Bluff, AR
February 6, 2025; 6:00 p.m.		Bethune–Cookman	W 64-57	11-10 (10-0)	H&PE Arena (629); Houston, TX
February 8, 2025; 3:00 p.m.		Florida A&M	W 77-70	12-10 (11-0)	H&PE Arena (1,807); Houston, TX
February 13, 2025; 6:00 p.m.		at Southern	L 53-63	12-11 (11-1)	F. G. Clark Center (3,678); Baton Rouge, LA
February 15, 2025; 2:00 p.m., SWAC Digital Network		at Grambling State	L 46-71	12-12 (11-2)	Fredrick C. Hobdy Assembly Center (1,015); Grambling, LA
February 20, 2025; 6:00 p.m.		Arkansas–Pine Bluff	W 73-59	13-12 (12-2)	H&PE Arena (378); Houston, TX
February 22, 2025; 3:00 p.m., HBCU Sports Network		Mississippi Valley State	W 81–72	14–12 (13–2)	H&PE Arena (467); Houston, TX
February 27, 2025; 6:00 p.m.		at Alcorn State	L 52–60	14–13 (13–3)	Davey Whitney Complex (203); Lorman, MS
March 1, 2025; 2:00 p.m., SWAC Digital Network		at Jackson State	L 60–63	14–14 (13–4)	Williams Assembly Center (961); Jackson, MS
March 8, 2025; 2:00 p.m., SWAC Digital Network		at Prairie View A&M	W 64–60	15–14 (14–4)	William Nicks Building; Prairie View, TX
SWAC tournament
March 12, 2025; 10:00 a.m., ESPN+	(2)	vs. (10) Prairie View A&M; Quarterfinals	W 69–49	16–14	Gateway Center Arena (975); College Park, GA
March 14, 2025; 10:00 a.m., ESPN+	(2)	vs. (6) Alcorn State; Semifinals	L 49–69	16–15	Gateway Center Arena (975); College Park, GA
WNIT
March 20, 2025; 7:30 p.m., ESPN+		Saint Mary's; First Round	W 54–50	17–15	H&PE Arena (573); Houston, TX
March 24, 2025; 6:30 p.m., ESPN+		Louisiana Tech; Second Round	L 64–71	17–16	Thomas Assembly Center; Ruston, LA
*Non-conference game. ^{#}Rankings from AP poll. (#) Tournament seedings in parentheses. All times are in Central.
