= 2025 SWAC women's basketball tournament =

American collegiate Tournament

- Classification: Division I
- Season: 2024–25
- Teams: 10
- Site: Gateway Center Arena; College Park, Georgia
- Champions: Southern (7th title)
- Winning coach: Carlos Funchess (2nd title)
- Television: ESPN+

2024–25 SWAC women's basketball standings
	Conf.				Overall
Team	W		L	PCT	W		L	PCT
Southern †	15	–	3	.833	21	–	15	.583
Texas Southern	14	–	4	.778	17	–	16	.515
Alabama A&M	14	–	4	.778	21	–	11	.656
Jackson State	13	–	5	.722	16	–	15	.516
Grambling State	12	–	6	.667	15	–	15	.500
Alcorn State	10	–	8	.556	14	–	18	.438
Bethune–Cookman	7	–	11	.389	10	–	21	.323
Florida A&M	6	–	12	.333	9	–	21	.300
Mississippi Valley State	6	–	12	.333	8	–	23	.258
Prairie View A&M	6	–	12	.333	10	–	19	.345
Alabama State	4	–	14	.222	6	–	24	.200
Arkansas–Pine Bluff	1	–	17	.056	3	–	25	.107
† 2025 SWAC tournament winner

The 2025 SWAC Women's Basketball Tournament was the postseason women's basketball tournament for the 2024–25 season in the Southwestern Athletic Conference (SWAC). The tournament was held from March 11–15, 2025 at Gateway Center Arena in College Park, Georgia. The tournament winner, Southern received an automatic invitation to the 2025 NCAA Division I Women's Basketball Tournament. The tournament was sponsored by Pepsi.

== Seeds ==
Teams were seeded by record within the conference, with a tie–breaker system to seed teams with identical conference records. Only the top ten teams in the conference will qualified for the tournament, after the conference expanded the tournament field from eight to ten teams.

Seed	School	Conference	Tiebreaker
1	Southern	15–3	
2	Texas Southern	14–4	1–0 vs. Alabama A&M
3	Alabama A&M	14–4	0–1 vs. Texas Southern
4	Jackson State	13–5	
5	Grambling State	12–6	
6	Alcorn State	10–8	
7	Bethune–Cookman	7–11	
8	Florida A&M	6–12	2–0 vs. MVSU/PVAMU
9	Mississippi Valley State	6–12	2–0 vs. Alcorn State
10	Prairie View A&M	6–12	1–1 vs. Alcorn State
DNQ	Alabama State	4–14	
DNQ	Arkansas–Pine Bluff	1–17	

== Schedule ==
Game	Time*	Matchup^{#}	Score	Television
First round – Tuesday, March 11
1	11:00 a.m.	No. 8 Florida A&M vs. No. 9 Mississippi Valley State	65–68^{OT}	ESPN+
2	5:30 p.m.	No. 7 Bethune–Cookman vs. No. 10 Prairie View A&M	52–57^{OT}	ESPN+
Quarterfinals – Wednesday, March 12
3	11:00 a.m.	No. 1 Southern vs. No. 9 Mississippi Valley State	63–43	ESPN+
4	5:30 p.m.	No. 2 Texas Southern vs. No. 10 Prairie View A&M	69–49	ESPN+
Quarterfinals – Thursday, March 13
5	11:00 a.m.	No. 3 Alabama A&M vs. No. 6 Alcorn State	53–56	ESPN+
6	5:30 p.m.	No. 4 Jackson State vs. No. 5 Grambling State	57–47	ESPN+
Semifinals – Friday, March 14
7	11:00 a.m.	No. 2 Texas Southern vs. No. 6 Alcorn State	55–65	ESPN+
8	5:30 p.m.	No. 1 Southern vs. No. 4 Jackson State	51–47	ESPN+
Championship – Saturday, March 15
9	3:30 p.m.	No. 6 Alcorn State vs. No. 1 Southern	44–64	ESPN+
*Game times in EDT. #-Rankings denote tournament seeding.

== Bracket ==
First round March 11, 2025; ESPN+
8	Florida A&M	65
9	Mississippi Valley State	68*
7	Bethune–Cookman	52
10	Prairie View A&M	57*

Quarterfinals; March 12–13, 2025; ESPN+
1	Southern	63
9	Mississippi Valley State	43
4	Jackson State	57
5	Grambling State	47
2	Texas Southern	69
10	Prairie View A&M	49
3	Alabama A&M	53
6	Alcorn State	56

Semifinals; March 14, 2025; ESPN+
1	Southern	51
4	Jackson State	47
2	Texas Southern	55
6	Alcorn State	65

Championship; March 15, 2025; ESPN+
1	Southern	64
6	Alcorn State	44
