= Bethune–Cookman Wildcats women's basketball =

Bethune–Cookman Wildcats
2026–27 Bethune–Cookman Wildcats women's basketball team
- University: Bethune–Cookman University
- Head coach: Demetria Frank (1st season)
- Location: Daytona Beach, Florida
- Arena: Moore Gymnasium (capacity: 3,000)
- Conference: SWAC
- Nickname: Wildcats
- Colors: Maroon and gold

NCAA Division I tournament appearances
- 2019

Conference tournament champions
- 1984, 2019

Conference regular-season champions
- 2016, 2017, 2020

The Bethune–Cookman Wildcats women's basketball team represents Bethune–Cookman University in the sport of basketball. The Wildcats competes in the NCAA Division I and the Southwestern Athletic Conference (SWAC). They play their home games in Moore Gymnasium on Bethune–Cookman University campus in Daytona Beach, Florida.

== History ==
The Wildcats played women's basketball in the Mid-Eastern Athletic Conference starting in the 1980s. They reached the MEAC women's basketball tournament final for the first time in 1983, losing to South Carolina State. They got their revenge the following year for their first MEAC title. At the time, however, the MEAC winner did not go to the NCAA Tournament. They lost in the MEAC final in 1992. In 2016 and 2017, they won the regular season MEAC title but lost in the MEAC tournament, with the latter being a loss to Hampton in the final. Their regular season titles meant that they were invited into the Women's National Invitation Tournament, with the 2016 one being their first ever postseason appearance. They lost the MEAC tournament in 2018 but had a respectable record that saw them reach the WNIT again. Finally, Bethune–Cookman won the 2019 MEAC tournament over Norfolk State. The 2019 appearance in the NCAA tournament was their first ever NCAA Division I basketball tournament appearance for the school. In the 2021-22 athletic season, Bethune–Cookman joined the Southwestern Athletic Conference.

== Postseason appearances ==
=== NCAA Division I ===
The Wildcats have appeared in the NCAA Division I women's basketball tournament once. They have a combined record of 0–1.

Year	Round	Opponent	Result
2019	First Round	Notre Dame	L 50–92

=== WNIT ===
The Wildcats have appeared in the Women's National Invitation Tournament three times. They have a combined record of 0–3.

Year	Round	Opponent	Result
2016	First Round	Florida Gulf Coast	L 51–78
2017	First Round	Wake Forest	L 42–71
2018	First Round	Georgia Tech	L 32–85
