= Alabama A&M Lady Bulldogs basketball =

College level women's basketball team

Alabama A&M Lady Bulldogs
2026–27 Alabama A&M Lady Bulldogs basketball team
- University: Alabama A&M University
- Head coach: Dawn Thornton (2nd season)
- Location: Huntsville, Alabama
- Arena: Alabama A&M Events Center (capacity: 6,000)
- Conference: SWAC
- Nickname: Lady Bulldogs
- Colors: Maroon and white

NCAA Division I tournament appearances
- Division II: 1991, 1997

Conference tournament champions
- SIAC: 1984, 1991

Conference regular-season champions
- SWAC: 2026

The Alabama A&M Lady Bulldogs basketball team is the basketball team that represents Alabama A&M University in Normal, Alabama. The school's team currently competes in the Southwestern Athletic Conference.

== History ==
The Bulldogs played in the Southern Intercollegiate Athletic Conference from 1947 to 1998 before joining the SWAC. They have made two NCAA Tournament appearances, both being in Division II, which they lost in the First Round both times.

=== NCAA Division II Tournament appearances ===
Year	Round	Opponent	Result
1991	Semifinals	Delta State	L 90–107
1997	First round	Kentucky State	L 63–78
