= Moore Gymnasium =

Arena in Daytona Beach, Florida

- Interactive map of Moore Gymnasium
- Location: 623 Dr Mary McLeod Bethune Blvd, Daytona Beach, FL 32114
- Coordinates: 29.210895°N 81.030977°W
- Capacity: 3,000

Tenants
- Bethune–Cookman Wildcats (basketball and volleyball)

Moore Gymnasium is a 3,000-seat multi-purpose arena in Daytona Beach, Florida. It is home to the Bethune–Cookman Wildcats men's and women's basketball teams and women's volleyball team. It gets its name from the university's third president, Richard V. Moore.

== See also ==
- List of NCAA Division I basketball arenas
