= Alabama A&M Events Center =

Indoor arena in Huntsville, Alabama

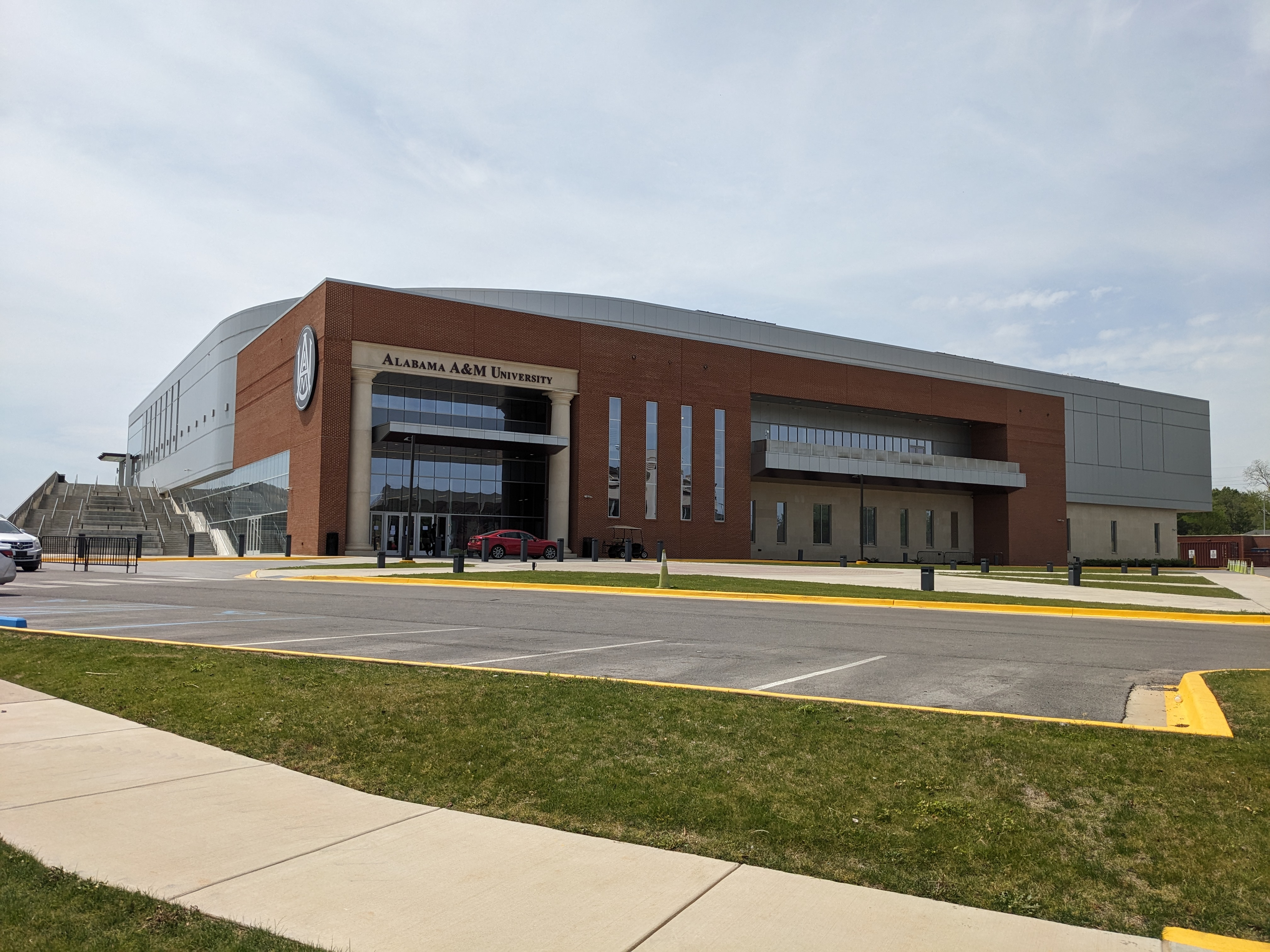
- The Alabama A&M Events Center in April 2025
- Interactive map of Alabama A&M Events Center
- Full name: Alabama A&M Events Center
- Location: Stallworth Rd NW; Huntsville, AL 35810
- Coordinates: 34°46′52.1″N 86°34′49.9″W
- Owner: Alabama A&M University
- Operator: Alabama A&M University
- Capacity: 6,000

Construction
- Opened: 2022

Tenant
- Alabama A&M Bulldogs

The Alabama A&M Events Center is the arena that hosts the basketball teams of the Alabama A&M Bulldogs and Lady Bulldogs of the Southwestern Athletic Conference. The arena is located in Huntsville, Alabama, on the west side of the campus of Alabama A&M University. It lies south of Louis Crews Stadium and west of the baseball and softball fields.

The arena was opened in 2022 to replace Elmore Gymnasium, which is northeast of LCS. The facility holds up to 6,000 people for basketball games. Other than basketball and volleyball games, the arena also hosts graduation ceremonies, and other functions of Alabama A&M University. It also contains locker rooms for the team, training rooms, a Hall of Fame honoring past Alabama A&M student athletes, and a kitchen to help provide meals for on-campus events.
