= 2023–24 Big Ten Conference men's basketball season =

- League: NCAA Division I
- Sport: Basketball
- Teams: 14
- TV partner(s): Big Ten Network, Fox, FS1, CBS, Peacock

2023–24 NCAA Division I men's basketball season
- Regular season champions: Purdue
- Season MVP: Zach Edey, Purdue

Tournament
- Venue: Target Center, Minneapolis, Minnesota
- Champions: Illinois
- Runners-up: Wisconsin
- Finals MVP: Terrence Shannon Jr.

Basketball seasons
- 2022–23 2024–25

2023–24 Big Ten Conference men's basketball standings
	Conf.				Overall
Team	W		L	PCT	W		L	PCT
No. 2 Purdue	17	–	3	.850	34	–	5	.872
No. 6 Illinois †	14	–	6	.700	29	–	9	.763
Nebraska	12	–	8	.600	23	–	11	.676
Northwestern	12	–	8	.600	22	–	12	.647
Wisconsin	11	–	9	.550	22	–	14	.611
Indiana	10	–	10	.500	19	–	14	.576
Iowa	10	–	10	.500	19	–	15	.559
Michigan State	10	–	10	.500	20	–	15	.571
Minnesota	9	–	11	.450	19	–	15	.559
Ohio State	9	–	11	.450	22	–	14	.611
Penn State	9	–	11	.450	16	–	17	.485
Maryland	7	–	13	.350	16	–	17	.485
Rutgers	7	–	13	.350	15	–	17	.469
Michigan	3	–	17	.150	8	–	24	.250
† 2024 Big Ten tournament winner Rankings from AP poll

The 2023–24 Big Ten men's basketball season was the season for Big Ten Conference basketball teams that began with practices in October 2023, followed by the start of the 2023–24 NCAA Division I men's basketball season in November 2023. The regular season ended on March 10, 2024.

With a win over Michigan State on March 2, Purdue clinched a share of the Big Ten regular season championship. With a win over Illinois on March 5, the Boilermakers secured the outright Big Ten regular season championship for the second consecutive season and 26th overall.

Purdue center Zach Edey was named Big Ten Player of the Year for the second consecutive season. Nebraska coach Fred Hoiberg and Purdue coach Matt Painter were named co-Big Ten Coaches of the Year.

The Big Ten tournament was held from March 13 through March 17, 2024 at Target Center in Minneapolis, Minnesota. Illinois defeated Wisconsin in the championship game to win their fourth tournament title.

In addition to Illinois, who received the conference' automatic bid to the NCAA tournament, Michigan State, Nebraska, Northwestern, Purdue, and Wisconsin received bids to the tournament.

Three schools also received invitations to the National Invitation Tournament: Iowa, Minnesota, and Ohio State.

The season marked the last season played with 14 teams in the conference, with four schools (Oregon, UCLA, USC, and Washington) joining the conference in 2024. This was the first season played under the Big Ten's new seven-year media rights deal. As a result, no conference games were played on ESPN and some games were played on Peacock for the first time.

== Head coaches ==
=== Coaching changes ===
==== Penn State ====
On March 22, 2023, Micah Shrewsberry left Penn State to take the head coaching job at Notre Dame. On March 29, the school named VCU head coach Mike Rhoades the team's new head coach.

==== Ohio State ====
On February 14, 2024, Chris Holtmann was fired after 25 games, he finished his career at Ohio State with an overall record of 137–85. Ohio State promoted assistant coach Jake Diebler as interim head coach.

=== Coaches ===
Team	Head coach	Previous job	Years at school	Overall record	Big Ten record	Big Ten titles	Big Ten tournament titles	NCAA Tournaments	NCAA Final Fours	NCAA Championships
Illinois	Brad Underwood	Oklahoma State	7	103–79 (.566)	66–52 (.559)	1	1	3	0	0
Indiana	Mike Woodson	New York Knicks (Asst.)	3	44–26 (.629)	21–19 (.525)	0	0	2	0	0
Iowa	Fran McCaffery	Siena	14	263–176 (.599)	126–118 (.516)	0	1	7	0	0
Maryland	Kevin Willard	Seton Hall	2	22–13 (.629)	11–9 (.550)	0	0	1	0	0
Michigan	Juwan Howard	Miami Heat (Asst.)	5	79–47 (.627)	46–31 (.597)	1	0	2	0	0
Michigan State	Tom Izzo	Michigan State (Asst.)	29	687–280 (.710)	332–160 (.675)	10	6	25	8	1
Minnesota	Ben Johnson	Xavier (Asst.)	3	22–42 (.344)	6–33 (.154)	0	0	0	0	0
Nebraska	Fred Hoiberg	Chicago Bulls	5	40–83 (.325)	18–61 (.228)	0	0	0	0	0
Northwestern	Chris Collins	Duke (Asst.)	11	155–162 (.489)	68–119 (.364)	0	0	2	0	0
Ohio State	Jake Diebler (interim)†	Ohio State (Asst.)	1	0–0 (–)	0–0 (–)	0	0	0	0	0
Penn State	Mike Rhoades	VCU	1	0–0 (–)	0–0 (–)	0	0	0	0	0
Purdue	Matt Painter	Purdue (Assoc.)	19	403–201 (.667)	209–120 (.635)	4	2	14	0	0
Rutgers	Steve Pikiell	Stony Brook	8	107–107 (.500)	56–60 (.483)	0	0	2	0	0
Wisconsin	Greg Gard	Wisconsin (Assoc.)	9	164–93 (.638)	90–61 (.596)	2	0	5	0	0

Notes:

- All records, appearances, titles, etc. are from time with current school only.
- Year at school includes 2023–24 season.
- Overall and Big Ten records are from time at current school only and are through the beginning of the season.
- † Chris Holtmann was fired on February 14, 2024. He finished his career at Ohio State with an overall record of 137–84.

== Preseason ==
=== Preseason Big Ten poll ===
Prior to the conference's annual media day, conference standings were projected by panel of writers.

Rank	Team
1	Purdue (24)
2	Michigan State (4)
3	Maryland
4	Illinois
5	Wisconsin
6	Indiana
7	Ohio State
8	Northwestern
9	Iowa
10	Rutgers
11	Michigan
12	Nebraska
13	Penn State
14	Minnesota
(first place votes)

=== Preseason All-Big Ten ===
A select media panel named a preseason All-Big Ten team and player of the year.

Honor	Recipient
Preseason Player of the Year	Zach Edey, Purdue
Preseason All-Big Ten Team	Boo Buie, Northwestern
Preseason All-Big Ten Team	Zach Edey, Purdue
Preseason All-Big Ten Team	Dawson Garcia, Minnesota
Preseason All-Big Ten Team	A.J. Hoggard, Michigan State
Preseason All-Big Ten Team	Clifford Omoruyi, Rutgers
Preseason All-Big Ten Team	Julian Reese, Maryland
Preseason All-Big Ten Team	Terrence Shannon Jr., Illinois
Preseason All-Big Ten Team	Keisei Tominaga, Nebraska
Preseason All-Big Ten Team	Tyson Walker, Michigan State
Preseason All-Big Ten Team	Jahmir Young, Maryland

=== Preseason All-American teams ===
Player	AP
Zach Edey	1st

=== Preseason national polls ===
	AP	Blue Ribbon Yearbook	CBS Sports	Coaches	ESPN	FOX Sports	Lindy's Sports	Sporting News	Sports Illustrated
Illinois	25		18		25				25
Indiana									
Iowa									
Maryland			23			19	25	16	
Michigan									
Michigan State	4	5	11	4	4	4	4	5	5
Minnesota									
Nebraska									
Northwestern									
Ohio State									
Penn State									
Purdue	3	2	1	2	3	3	3	2	3
Rutgers									
Wisconsin									

=== Preseason watchlists ===
Below is a table of notable midseason watch lists.

Player	Wooden	Naismith	Naismith DPOY	Robertson	Cousy	West	Erving	Malone	Abdul-Jabbar
Jamison Battle, Ohio State							✓		
Ace Baldwin Jr., Penn State					✓				
Boo Buie, Northwestern	✓	✓			✓				
Coen Carr, Michigan State							✓		
Zach Edey, Purdue	✓	✓							✓
Dawson Garcia, Minnesota									✓
Coleman Hawkins, Illinois								✓	
A.J. Hoggard, Michigan State		✓							
Fletcher Loyer, Purdue						✓			
Clifford Omoruyi, Rutgers		✓							✓
Julian Reese, Maryland								✓	
Payton Sandfort, Iowa							✓		
Terrence Shannon Jr., Illinois	✓	✓				✓			
Tyler Wahl, Wisconsin							✓		
Tyson Walker, Michigan State	✓	✓				✓			
Kel'el Ware, Indiana									✓
Jahmir Young, Maryland	✓	✓			✓				

== Regular season ==
=== 2023 Gavitt Tipoff Games (Tied 4–4) ===
Date	Time	Big East team	Big Ten team	Score	Location	Television	Attendance	Leader
Mon., Nov. 13	6:30 p.m.	St. John's	Michigan	89–73	Madison Square Garden • New York, NY	FS1	14,188	Big Ten (1–0)
Mon., Nov. 13	8:30 p.m.	Xavier	No. 2 Purdue	83–71	Mackey Arena • West Lafayette, IN	FS1	14,876	Big Ten (2–0)
Tue., Nov. 14	6:00 p.m.	Providence	Wisconsin	72–59	Amica Mutual Pavilion • Providence, RI	FS1	12,069	Big Ten (2–1)
Tue., Nov. 14	8:00 p.m.	No. 4 Marquette	No. 23 Illinois	71–64	State Farm Center • Champaign, IL	FS1	15,544	Tied (2–2)
Tue., Nov. 14	10:00 p.m.	No. 8 Creighton	Iowa	92–84	CHI Health Center Omaha • Omaha, NE	FS1	17,352	Big East (3–2)
Wed., Nov. 15	8:30 p.m.	Georgetown	Rutgers	71–60	Jersey Mike's Arena • Piscataway, NJ	FS1	8,000	Tied (3–3)
Fri., Nov. 17	6:30 p.m.	Butler	No. 18 Michigan State	74–54	Breslin Center • East Lansing, MI	FS1	14,797	Big Ten (4–3)
Fri., Nov. 17	8:30 p.m.	No. 21 Villanova	Maryland	57–40	Finneran Pavilion • Villanova, PA	FS1	6,501	Tied (4–4)
WINNERS ARE IN BOLD. Game Times in EST. Rankings from AP Poll. Did not participate: Connecticut, DePaul, Seton Hall (Big East); Indiana, Minnesota, Nebraska, Northwestern, Ohio State, Penn State (Big Ten)

=== Rankings ===
Legend
	Improvement in ranking
	Drop in ranking
	Not ranked previous week
RV	Received votes but were not ranked in Top 25 of poll
(Italics)	Number of first place votes

		Pre/ Wk 1	Wk 2	Wk 3	Wk 4	Wk 5	Wk 6	Wk 7	Wk 8	Wk 9	Wk 10	Wk 11	Wk 12	Wk 13	Wk 14	Wk 15	Wk 16	Wk 17	Wk 18	Wk 19	Wk 20	Final
Illinois	AP	25	23	RV	24	20	16	13	11	9	10	14	10	14	10	14	12	13	12	13	10	6
Illinois	C	RV	23	22	24	18	16	11	9	8	10	14	11	14	12	14	12	16	12	14	10	7
Indiana	AP	RV																				
Indiana	C	RV					RV		RV													
Iowa	AP		RV																			
Iowa	C	RV	RV	RV																		
Maryland	AP	RV																				
Maryland	C	RV																				
Michigan	AP		RV	RV																		
Michigan	C		RV																			
Michigan State	AP	4	18	21	RV	RV		RV	RV	RV	RV		RV		RV	RV	RV		RV			RV
Michigan State	C	4 (4)	19	19	25	RV		RV	RV	RV	RV		RV		RV	RV	RV				RV	RV
Minnesota	AP																					
Minnesota	C																					
Nebraska	AP				RV													RV		RV	RV	
Nebraska	C							RV	RV	RV		RV						RV	RV	RV	RV	
Northwestern	AP					RV	25	RV	RV	RV	RV			RV	RV	RV		RV				RV
Northwestern	C					RV	RV				RV			RV	RV	RV		RV	RV	RV		RV
Ohio State	AP				RV	RV	RV	RV	RV	RV												
Ohio State	C	RV			RV	25	RV	RV	RV	RV	RV											
Penn State	AP																					
Penn State	C																					
Purdue	AP	3 (3)	2 (7)	2 (5)	1 (60)	4	3	1 (48)	1 (46)	1 (49)	1 (54)	2 (20)	2 (17)	2 (14)	2 (16)	2 (16)	3	2 (4)	3 (4)	3 (4)	3	2
Purdue	C	2 (5)	2 (3)	2 (5)	1 (32)	4	4	1 (20)	1 (24)	1 (23)	1 (21)	2 (12)	2 (8)	2 (8)	2 (7)	2 (8)	3	3 (4)	3 (1)	3 (2)	3	2
Rutgers	AP																					
Rutgers	C																					
Wisconsin	AP	RV	RV			23	23	24	23	21	15	11	13	6	11	20	RV	RV			23	RV
Wisconsin	C	RV	RV			RV	23	24	23	21	15	8	10	6	9	21	RV	RV			24	RV

=== Early season tournaments ===
Of the 14 Big Ten teams, nine participated in early season tournaments. Eight teams participated in the Gavitt Tipoff Games.

Team	Tournament	Finish
Indiana	Empire Classic	3rd
Iowa	Rady Children's Invitational	3rd
Maryland	Asheville Championship	4th
Michigan	Battle 4 Atlantis	6th
Northwestern	Hall of Fame Tip-Off	2nd
Ohio State	Emerald Coast Classic	1st
Penn State	ESPN Events Invitational	8th
Purdue	Maui Invitational	1st
Wisconsin	Fort Myers Tip-Off	1st

=== Players of the week ===
Throughout the conference regular season, the Big Ten offices named one or two players of the week and one or two freshmen of the week each Monday.

Week	Player of the week	Freshman of the week
November 13, 2023	Dawson Garcia, Minnesota	Owen Freeman, Iowa
November 20, 2023	Ben Krikki, Iowa	Owen Freeman (2), Iowa
November 27, 2023	Zach Edey, Purdue	John Blackwell, Wisconsin
December 4, 2023	Boo Buie, Northwestern	Owen Freeman (3), Iowa
December 11, 2023	Zach Edey (2), Purdue	John Blackwell (2), Wisconsin
December 18, 2023	Fletcher Loyer, Purdue	Owen Freeman (4), Iowa
January 2, 2024	Jahmir Young, Maryland	Mackenzie Mgbako, Indiana
January 8, 2024	Marcus Domask, Illinois	Owen Freeman (5), Iowa
January 15, 2024	Jahmir Young (2), Maryland	Owen Freeman (6), Iowa
January 22, 2024	Zach Edey (3), Purdue	John Blackwell (3), Wisconsin
January 29, 2024	Boo Buie (2), Northwestern	Owen Freeman (7), Iowa
February 5, 2024	Zach Edey (4), Purdue	Cam Christie, Minnesota
February 12, 2024	Jeremiah Williams, Rutgers	Owen Freeman (8), Iowa
February 19, 2024	Terrence Shannon Jr., Illinois	Owen Freeman (9), Iowa
February 26, 2024	Zach Edey (5), Purdue	Mackenzie Mgbako (2), Indiana
March 4, 2024	Payton Sandfort, Iowa	Cam Christie (2), Minnesota
March 11, 2024	Zach Edey (6), Purdue	John Blackwell (4), Wisconsin

=== Conference matrix ===
This table summarizes the head-to-head results between teams in conference play. Each team is scheduled to play 20 conference games with at least one game against each opponent.

	Illinois	Indiana	Iowa	Maryland	Michigan	Michigan St	Minnesota	Nebraska	Northwestern	Ohio St	Penn St	Purdue	Rutgers	Wisconsin
vs. Illinois	–	0–1	0–2	1–1	0–2	1–1	0–1	0–1	1–1	0–1	1–0	1–0	0–2	0–1
vs. Indiana	1–0	–	0–1	0–2	0–1	0–1	0–2	2–0	1–0	0–2	1–0	2–0	1–0	1–1
vs. Iowa	2–0	1–0	–	2–0	1–1	0–1	0–2	0–1	0–1	0–1	1–1	2–0	0–1	1–1
vs. Maryland	1–1	2–0	0–2	–	0–1	2–0	1–0	0–1	2–0	1–0	1–1	1–0	1–1	1–0
vs. Michigan	2–0	1–0	1–1	1–0	–	2–0	1–0	2–0	1–0	1–1	1–0	2–0	2–0	0–1
vs. Michigan St	1–1	1–0	1–0	0–2	0–2	–	1–1	1–0	1–1	1–0	0–2	1–0	0–1	2–0
vs. Minnesota	1–0	2–0	2–0	0–1	0–1	1–1	–	1–1	1–1	1–1	0–2	1–0	0–1	1–0
vs. Nebraska	1–0	0–2	1–0	1–0	0–2	0–1	1–1	–	1–1	1–1	0–1	1–1	1–1	1–1
vs. Northwestern	1–1	0–1	1–0	0–2	0–1	1–1	1–1	1–1	–	0–1	0–2	1–1	1–0	1–0
vs. Ohio State	1–0	2–0	1–0	0–1	1–1	0–1	1–1	1–1	1–0	–	1–0	0–1	0–2	2–0
vs. Penn State	0–1	0–2	1–1	1–1	0–1	2–0	2–0	1–0	2–0	1–1		1–0	0–1	0–1
vs. Purdue	0–2	0–2	0–2	0–2	0–2	0–1	0–1	1–0	1–1	1–0	1–1	–	0–2	0–2
vs. Rutgers	2–0	0–1	1–0	1–0	0–2	1–0	1–0	1–1	0–1	2–0	1–0	2–0	–	1–1
vs. Wisconsin	1–0	1–1	1–1	0–1	1–0	0–2	0–1	1–1	0–1	0–2	1–1	2–0	1–1	–
Total	14–6	10–10	10–10	7–13	3–17	10–10	9–11	12–8	12–8	9–11	9–11	17–3	7–13	11–9

Final regular season records

== Honors and awards ==
=== All-Big Ten awards and teams ===
On March 12, 2024, the Big Ten announced most of its conference awards.

Honor	Coaches	Media
Player of the Year	Zach Edey, Purdue	Zach Edey, Purdue
Co-Coach of the Year	Fred Hoiberg, Nebraska	Fred Hoiberg, Nebraska
Co-Coach of the Year	Matt Painter, Purdue	Matt Painter, Purdue
Co-Freshman of the Year	Mackenzie Mgbako, Indiana	Owen Freeman, Iowa
Co-Freshman of the Year	Owen Freeman, Iowa	
Defensive Players of the Year	Ace Baldwin Jr., Penn State	Not selected
Sixth Man of the Year	Mason Gillis, Purdue	Not selected
All-Big Ten First Team	Boo Buie, Northwestern	Boo Buie, Northwestern
All-Big Ten First Team	Marcus Domask, Illinois	Zach Edey, Purdue
All-Big Ten First Team	Zach Edey, Purdue	Terrence Shannon Jr., Illinois
All-Big Ten First Team	Terrence Shannon Jr., Illinois	Braden Smith, Purdue
All-Big Ten First Team	Braden Smith, Purdue	Jahmir Young, Maryland
All-Big Ten Second Team	Tony Perkins, Iowa	Marcus Domask, Illinois
All-Big Ten Second Team	AJ Storr, Wisconsin	Dawson Garcia, Minnesota
All-Big Ten Second Team	Keisei Tominaga, Nebraska	AJ Storr, Wisconsin
All-Big Ten Second Team	Tyson Walker, Michigan State	Tyson Walker, Michigan State
All-Big Ten Second Team	Jahmir Young, Maryland	Kel'el Ware, Indiana
All-Big Ten Third Team	Ace Baldwin Jr., Penn State	Ace Baldwin Jr., Penn State
All-Big Ten Third Team	Brooks Barnhizer, Northwestern	Coleman Hawkins, Illinois
All-Big Ten Third Team	Dawson Garcia, Minnesota	Payton Sandfort, Iowa
All-Big Ten Third Team	Rienk Mast, Nebraska	Bruce Thornton, Ohio State
All-Big Ten Third Team	Payton Sandfort, Iowa	Keisei Tominago, Nebraska
All-Big Ten Third Team	Kel'el Ware, Indiana	Not selected
All-Big Ten Honorable Mention	Coleman Hawkins, Illinois	Malik Reneau, Indiana
All-Big Ten Honorable Mention	Malik Reneau, Indiana	Josh Dix, Iowa
All-Big Ten Honorable Mention	Owen Freeman, Iowa	Owen Freeman, Iowa
All-Big Ten Honorable Mention	Donta Scott, Maryland	Ben Krikke, Iowa
All-Big Ten Honorable Mention	Julian Reese, Maryland	Tony Perkins, Iowa
All-Big Ten Honorable Mention	Malik Hall, Michigan State	Julian Reese, Maryland
All-Big Ten Honorable Mention	A.J. Hoggard, Michigan State	Malik Hall, Michigan State
All-Big Ten Honorable Mention	Elijah Hawkins, Minnesota	A.J. Hoggard, Michigan State
All-Big Ten Honorable Mention	Jamison Battle, Ohio State	Elijah Hawksin, Minnesota
All-Big Ten Honorable Mention	Bruce Thornton, Ohio State	Rienk Mast, Nebraska
All-Big Ten Honorable Mention	Zach Hicks, Penn State	Brooks Barnhizer, Northwestern
All-Big Ten Honorable Mention	Nick Kern Jr., Penn State	Jamsison Battle, Ohio State
All-Big Ten Honorable Mention	Mason Gillis, Purdue	Clifford Omoruyi, Rutgers
All-Big Ten Honorable Mention	Lance Jones, Purdue	Lance Jones, Purdue
All-Big Ten Honorable Mention	Fletcher Loyer, Purdue	Fletcher Loyer, Purdue
All-Big Ten Honorable Mention	Clifford Omoruyi, Rutgers	Not selected
All-Big Ten Honorable Mention	Chucky Hepburn, Wisconsin	Not selected
All-Big Ten Honorable Mention	Tyler Wahl, Wisconsin	Not selected
All-Freshman Team	John Blackwell, Wisconsin	Not selected
All-Freshman Team	Cam Christie, Minnesota	Not selected
All-Freshman Team	Owen Freeman, Iowa	Not selected
All-Freshman Team	DeShawn Harris-Smith, Maryland	Not selected
All-Freshman Team	Mackenzie Mgbako, Indiana	Not selected
All-Defensive Team	Ace Baldwin Jr., Penn State	Not selected
All-Defensive Team	Brooks Barnhizer, Northwestern	Not selected
All-Defensive Team	Zach Edey, Purdue	Not selected
All-Defensive Team	Chucky Hepbrun, Wisconsin	Not selected
All-Defensive Team	Clifford Omoruyi, Rutgers	Not selected
All-Defensive Team	Kel'el Ware, Indiana	Not selected

Three Big Ten athletes were named Academic All-America: Marcus Domask (Illinois, First Team), Payton Sandfort (Iowa, Second Team), Jamison Battle (Ohio State, Third Team).

== Postseason ==
=== Big Ten tournament ===
First round Wednesday, March 13; Peacock
12	Maryland	65
13	Rutgers	51
11	Penn State	66
14	Michigan	57

Second round Thursday, March 14; BTN
8	Michigan State	77
9	Minnesota	67
5	Wisconsin	87
12	Maryland	56
7	Iowa	78
10	Ohio State	90
6	Indiana	61
11	Penn State	59

Quarterfinals; Friday, March 15; BTN
1	Purdue	67
8	Michigan State	62
4	Northwestern	61
5	Wisconsin	70
2	Illinois	77
10	Ohio State	74
3	Nebraska	93
6	Indiana	66

Semifinals; Saturday, March 16; CBS
1	Purdue	75
5	Wisconsin	76*
2	Illinois	98
3	Nebraska	87

Championship; Sunday, March 17; CBS
5	Wisconsin	87
2	Illinois	93

* denotes overtime period

=== NCAA Tournament ===
The winner of the Big Ten Tournament, Illinois, received the conference's automatic bid to the NCAA tournament. Six Big Ten teams received bids to the NCAA tournament.

Seed	Region	School	First round	Second round	Sweet Sixteen	Elite Eight	Final Four	Championship
1	Midwest	Purdue	Defeated (16) Grambling State, 78–50	Defeated (8) Utah State, 106–67	Defeated (5) Gonzaga, 80–68	Defeated (2) Tennessee, 72–66	Defeated (S11) NC State, 63–50	Lost to (E1) UConn 60–75
3	East	Illinois	Defeated (14) Morehead State, 85–69	Defeated (11) Duquesne, 89–63	Defeated (2) Iowa State, 72–69	Lost to (1) UConn, 52–77	DNP	
5	South	Wisconsin	Lost to (12) James Madison, 61–72	DNP				
8	South	Nebraska	Lost to (9) Texas A&M, 83–98	DNP				
9	West	Michigan State	Defeated (8) Mississippi State, 69–51	Lost to (1) North Carolina, 69–85	DNP			
9	East	Northwestern	Defeated (8) Florida Atlantic, 77–65	Lost to (1) UConn, 58–75	DNP			
		W–L (%):	4–2 (.667)	2–2 (.500)	2–0 (1.000)	1–1 (.500)	1–0 (1.000)	0–1 (.000) Total: 10–6 (.625)

=== National Invitation Tournament ===
Three Big Ten teams received invitations to the National Invitation Tournament.

Seed	School	First round	Second round	Quarterfinals	Semifinals	Finals
2	Ohio State	Defeated Cornell, 88–83	Defeated (3) Virginia Tech, 81–73	Lost to (4) Georgia, 77–79	DNP	
3	Iowa	Defeated Kansas State, 91–82	Lost to (2) Utah, 82–91	DNP		
–	Minnesota	Defeated (4) Butler, 73–72	Lost to (1) Indiana State, 64–76	DNP		
	W–L (%):	3–0 (1.000)	1–2 (.333)	0–1 (.000)	0–0 (–)	0–0 (–) Total: 4–3 (.571)
