= 2023–24 Ohio State Buckeyes men's basketball team =

American college basketball season

2023–24 Ohio State Buckeyes men's basketball

Emerald Coast Classic champions

NIT, Quarterfinals
- Conference: Big Ten Conference
- Record: 22–14 (9–11 Big Ten)
- Head coach: Chris Holtmann (first 25 games); Jake Diebler
- Assistant coaches: Jack Owens (2nd season); Mike Netti (2nd season); Brandon Bailey (1st season)
- Home arena: Value City Arena

2023–24 Big Ten Conference men's basketball standings
	Conf.				Overall
Team	W		L	PCT	W		L	PCT
No. 2 Purdue	17	–	3	.850	34	–	5	.872
No. 6 Illinois †	14	–	6	.700	29	–	9	.763
Nebraska	12	–	8	.600	23	–	11	.676
Northwestern	12	–	8	.600	22	–	12	.647
Wisconsin	11	–	9	.550	22	–	14	.611
Indiana	10	–	10	.500	19	–	14	.576
Iowa	10	–	10	.500	19	–	15	.559
Michigan State	10	–	10	.500	20	–	15	.571
Minnesota	9	–	11	.450	19	–	15	.559
Ohio State	9	–	11	.450	22	–	14	.611
Penn State	9	–	11	.450	16	–	17	.485
Maryland	7	–	13	.350	16	–	17	.485
Rutgers	7	–	13	.350	15	–	17	.469
Michigan	3	–	17	.150	8	–	24	.250
† 2024 Big Ten tournament winner Rankings from AP poll

The 2023–24 Ohio State Buckeyes men's basketball team represented Ohio State University in the 2023–24 NCAA Division I men's basketball season. They were led by head coach Chris Holtmann for the first 25 games of the season. The Buckeyes played their home games at Value City Arena in Columbus, Ohio as members of the Big Ten Conference.

They finished the regular season 19–12, 9–11 in Big Ten play to finish in a three-way tie for ninth place. As the No. 10 seed in the Big Ten tournament, they defeated Iowa in the second round before losing to Illinois in the quarterfinals. They received a bid to the National Invitation Tournament as a No. 2 seed.

On February 14, 2024, the school fired head coach Chris Holtmann. Assistant coach Jake Diebler was named interim head coach for the remainder of the season. On March 17, the school named Diebler the team's new head coach.

== Previous season ==
The Buckeyes finished the season 16–19, 5–15 in Big Ten play to finish in 13th place. They defeated Wisconsin, Iowa, and Michigan State in the Big Ten tournament before losing to eventual tournament champion Purdue in the semifinals.

== Offseason ==
=== Departures ===
Ohio State departures
Name	Number	Pos.	Height	Weight	Year	Hometown	Reason for departure
Tanner Holden	0	G	6'6"	200	Senior	Wheelersburg, OH	Transferred to Wright State
Eugene Brown III	3	G	6'7"	195	Junior	Conyers, GA	Transferred to Georgia Southern
Sean McNeil	4	G	6'4"	205	GS Senior	Union, KY	Graduated
Brice Sensabaugh	10	F	6'6"	235	Freshman	Orlando, FL	Declared for 2023 NBA draft; selected 28th overall by Utah Jazz
Isaac Likekele	13	F	6'5"	215	GS Senior	Arlington, TX	Graduated; signed professional contract with Fyllingen BBK
Justice Sueing	14	G	6'6"	210	RS Senior	Honolulu, HI	Graduated; signed professional contract with Antwerp Giants

=== Incoming transfers ===
Ohio State incoming transfers
Name	Number	Pos.	Height	Weight	Year	Hometown	Previous school
Dale Bonner	4	G	6'2"	170	Senior	Shaker Heights, OH	Baylor
Jamison Battle	10	F	6'7"	225	Junior	Minneapolis, MN	Minnesota
Evan Mahaffey	12	F	6'6"	200	Freshman	Cincinnati, OH	Penn State

=== Recruiting classes ===
==== 2023 recruiting class ====
College recruiting information
Name	Hometown	School	Height	Weight	Commit date
Scotty Middleton; SF	Miami, Florida	Sunrise Christian Academy	6 ft 7 in (2.01 m)	190 lb (86 kg)	Aug 7, 2022
Scotty Middleton; SF	Recruit ratings: Rivals: 247Sports: ESPN: (88)				
Taison Chatman; CG	Minneapolis, Minnesota	Totino-Grace High School	6 ft 4 in (1.93 m)	175 lb (79 kg)	Sep 20, 2022
Taison Chatman; CG	Recruit ratings: Rivals: 247Sports: ESPN: (87)				
Devin Royal; SF	Pickerington, Ohio	Pickerington High School Central	6 ft 6 in (1.98 m)	210 lb (95 kg)	Aug 3, 2022
Devin Royal; SF	Recruit ratings: Rivals: 247Sports: ESPN: (86)				
Austin Parks; C	Saint Marys, Ohio	Memorial High School	6 ft 10 in (2.08 m)	260 lb (120 kg)	Feb 13, 2022
Austin Parks; C	Recruit ratings: Rivals: 247Sports: ESPN: (81)				
Overall recruit ranking: Rivals: 40 247Sports: 12 ESPN: —
Note: In many cases, Scout, Rivals, 247Sports, On3, and ESPN may conflict in their listings of height and weight.; In these cases, the average was taken. ESPN grades are on a 100-point scale.; Sources: "Ohio State 2023 Basketball Commitments". Rivals.; "2023 Ohio State Buckeyes Recruiting Class". ESPN.; "2023 Team Ranking". Rivals.; "Ohio State 2023 Basketball Commits". 247Sports.

==== 2024 recruiting class ====
College recruiting information (2024)
Name	Hometown	School	Height	Weight	Commit date
John "Juni" Mobley #6 PG	Mount Pleasant, Utah	Wasatch Academy	6 ft 0 in (1.83 m)	150 lb (68 kg)	Nov 8, 2023
John "Juni" Mobley #6 PG	Recruit ratings: Rivals: 247Sports: ESPN: (88)				
Colin White #25 SF	Ottawa, Ohio	Ottawa-Glandorf High School	6 ft 6 in (1.98 m)	180 lb (82 kg)	Nov 8, 2023
Colin White #25 SF	Recruit ratings: Rivals: 247Sports: ESPN: (79)				
Overall recruit ranking: Rivals: 40 247Sports: 41 ESPN: —
Note: In many cases, Scout, Rivals, 247Sports, On3, and ESPN may conflict in their listings of height and weight.; In these cases, the average was taken. ESPN grades are on a 100-point scale.; Sources: "Ohio State 2024 Basketball Commitments". Rivals.; "2024 Ohio State Buckeyes Recruiting Class". ESPN.; "2024 Team Ranking". Rivals.; "Ohio State 2024 Basketball Commits". 247Sports.

== Roster ==
2023–24 Ohio State Buckeyes men's basketball team
Players
Coaches

Pos.	#	Name	Height	Weight	Year	Previous school	Hometown
G	0	Scotty Middleton	6 ft 7 in (2.01 m)	190 lb (86 kg)	Fr	Sunrise Christian Academy	Miami, FL
G	1	Roddy Gayle Jr.	6 ft 4 in (1.93 m)	210 lb (95 kg)	So	Wasatch Academy	Niagara Falls, NY
G	2	Bruce Thornton	6 ft 2 in (1.88 m)	215 lb (98 kg)	So	Milton HS	Fairburn, GA
G	3	Taison Chatman	6 ft 4 in (1.93 m)	175 lb (79 kg)	Fr	Totino-Grace HS	Minneapolis, MN
G	4	Dale Bonner	6 ft 2 in (1.88 m)	175 lb (79 kg)	GS	Baylor	Shaker Heights, OH
F	10	Jamison Battle	6 ft 7 in (2.01 m)	220 lb (100 kg)	GS	Minnesota	Robbinsdale, MN
G	12	Evan Mahaffey	6 ft 6 in (1.98 m)	200 lb (91 kg)	So	Penn State	Cincinnati, OH
G	15	Bowen Hardman	6 ft 3 in (1.91 m)	190 lb (86 kg)	So	Princeton HS	Cincinnati, OH
F	21	Devin Royal	6 ft 6 in (1.98 m)	210 lb (95 kg)	Fr	Pickerington HS Central	Pickerington, OH
F	23	Zed Key	6 ft 8 in (2.03 m)	245 lb (111 kg)	Sr	Long Island Lutheran HS	Bay Shore, NY
F	24	Kalen Etzler (redshirt)	6 ft 8 in (2.03 m)	190 lb (86 kg)	So	Crestview HS	Van Wert, OH
C	25	Austin Parks	6 ft 10 in (2.08 m)	260 lb (118 kg)	Fr	Memorial HS	St. Marys, OH
C	34	Felix Okpara	6 ft 11 in (2.11 m)	235 lb (107 kg)	So	Link Academy	Lagos, Nigeria
G	42	Colby Baumann (W)	6 ft 3 in (1.91 m)	190 lb (86 kg)	So	IMG Academy	Houston, TX
F	44	Owen Spencer (W)	6 ft 9 in (2.06 m)	230 lb (104 kg)	Sr	The Citadel	Cincinnati, OH

Head coach

- Jake Diebler (Valparaiso)

Assistant coach(es)

- Jack Owens (Eastern Illinois)
- Mike Netti (Syracuse)
- Brandon Bailey (DePaul)

Legend

- (C) Team captain
- (S) Suspended
- (I) Ineligible
- (W) Walk-on
- Injured
- Current redshirt

Roster

=== Depth chart ===
Pos.	Starting 5	Bench 1	Bench 2
C	Felix Okpara	Zed Key	Austin Parks
PF	Jamison Battle	Devin Royal	Owen Spencer
SF	Scotty Middleton	Evan Mahaffey	Kalen Etzler
SG	Roddy Gayle Jr.	Taison Chatman	Colby Baumann
PG	Bruce Thornton	Dale Bonner	Bowen Hardman

== Schedule and results ==
Date time, TV	Rank^{#}	Opponent^{#}	Result	Record	High points	High rebounds	High assists	Site (attendance) city, state
Exhibition
October 22, 2023*; 6:00 p.m., ESPN+/BSOH		at Dayton	W 78–70	0–0	21 – Thornton	5 – Battle	3 – Bonner	UD Arena (13,407); Dayton, OH
Regular season
November 6, 2023*; 7:00 p.m., BTN Plus		Oakland	W 79–73	1–0	17 – Tied	8 – Tied	5 – Gayle Jr.	Value City Arena (9,244); Columbus, OH
November 10, 2023*; 7:00 p.m., Peacock		No. 15 Texas A&M	L 66–73	1–1	24 – Thornton	7 – Tied	6 – Gayle Jr.	Value City Arena (12,704); Columbus, OH
November 15, 2023*; 7:00 p.m., BTN		Merrimack	W 76–52	2–1	20 – Gayle Jr.	12 – Key	6 – Thornton	Value City Arena (7,929); Columbus, OH
November 19, 2023*; 4:00 p.m., BTN		Western Michigan; Emerald Coast Classic campus site game	W 73–56	3–1	13 – Tied	11 – Okpara	6 – Thornton	Value City Arena (9,505); Columbus, OH
November 24, 2023*; 7:00 p.m., CBSSN		vs. No. 17 Alabama; Emerald Coast Classic semifinals	W 92–81	4–1	29 – Thornton	10 – Okpara	4 – Thornton	The Arena at NFSC (2,196); Niceville, FL
November 25, 2023*; 7:00 p.m., CBSSN		vs. Santa Clara; Emerald Coast Classic Championship	W 86–56	5–1	21 – Battle	7 – Okpara	7 – Thornton	The Arena at NFSC (2,196); Niceville, FL
November 29, 2023*; 7:00 p.m., BTN		Central Michigan	W 88–61	6–1	25 – Thornton	9 – Okpara	5 – Mahaffey	Value City Arena (8,223); Columbus, OH
December 3, 2023; 6:30 p.m., BTN		Minnesota	W 84–74	7–1 (1–0)	26 – Thornton	7 – Tied	5 – Thornton	Value City Arena (10,481); Columbus, OH
December 6, 2023*; 7:00 p.m., BTN Plus		Miami (OH)	W 84–64	8–1	15 – Gayle Jr.	10 – Key	4 – Key	Value City Arena (9,098); Columbus, OH
December 9, 2023; 6:00 p.m., BTN		at Penn State	L 80–83	8–2 (1–1)	17 – Thornton	11 – Key	6 – Mahaffey	Bryce Jordan Center (9,732); University Park, PA
December 16, 2023*; 3:00 p.m., CBS		vs. UCLA; CBS Sports Classic	W 67–60	9–2	19 – Gayle, Jr.	7 – Thornton	4 – Thornton	State Farm Center (17,058); Atlanta, GA
December 21, 2023*; 6:00 p.m., BTN Plus		New Orleans	W 78–36	10–2	17 – Battle	9 – Battle	4 – Battle	Value City Arena (11,749); Columbus, OH
December 30, 2023*; 7:00 p.m., FOX		vs. West Virginia; Legends of Basketball Showcase	W 78–75 ^{OT}	11–2	32 – Gayle, Jr.	9 – Battle	6 – Gayle, Jr.	Rocket Mortgage FieldHouse (12,211); Cleveland, OH
January 3, 2024; 7:00 p.m., BTN		Rutgers	W 76–72	12–2 (2–1)	24 – Thornton	7 – 2 tied	7 – Thornton	Value City Arena (10,614); Columbus, OH
January 6, 2024; 8:00 p.m., FOX		at Indiana	L 65–71	12–3 (2–2)	17 – Battle	15 – Okpara	5 – Thornton	Simon Skjodt Assembly Hall (16,584); Bloomington, IN
January 10, 2024; 8:30 p.m., BTN		No. 15 Wisconsin	L 60–71	12–4 (2–3)	18 – Battle	8 – Battle	6 – Thornton	Value City Arena (11,276); Columbus, OH
January 15, 2024; 12:00 p.m., FOX		at Michigan; Rivalry	L 65–73	12–5 (2–4)	19 – Thornton	9 – Okpara	3 – Bonner	Crisler Center (12,202); Ann Arbor, MI
January 20, 2024; 12:00 p.m., BTN		Penn State	W 79–67	13–5 (3–4)	16 – Mahaffey	14 – Okpara	6 – Thornton	Value City Arena (15,267); Columbus, OH
January 23, 2024; 7:00 p.m., Peacock		at Nebraska	L 69–83	13–6 (3–5)	16 – Thornton	7 – Battle	6 – Thornton	Pinnacle Bank Arena (14,408); Lincoln, NE
January 27, 2024; 8:30 p.m., BTN		at Northwestern	L 58–83	13–7 (3–6)	18 – Thornton	5 – Okpara	3 – Gayle, Jr.	Welsh–Ryan Arena (6,218); Evanston, IL
January 30, 2024; 7:00 p.m., Peacock		No. 14 Illinois	L 75–87	13–8 (3–7)	21 – Battle	6 – Battle	4 – Thornton	Value City Arena (10,285); Columbus, OH
February 2, 2024; 7:00 p.m., FS1		at Iowa	L 77–79	13–9 (3–8)	17 – Battle	8 – Okpara	4 – Mahaffey	Carver–Hawkeye Arena (9,986); Iowa City, IA
February 6, 2024; 7:00 p.m., Peacock		Indiana	L 73–76	13–10 (3–9)	19 – 2 tied	6 – Mahaffey	4 – Gayle, Jr.	Value City Arena (11,157); Columbus, OH
February 10, 2024; 4:00 p.m., FS1		Maryland	W 79–75 ^{2OT}	14–10 (4–9)	24 – Thornton	7 – 2 tied	4 – Thornton	Value City Arena (13,471); Columbus, OH
February 13, 2024; 9:00 p.m., Peacock		at No. 20 Wisconsin	L 54–62	14–11 (4–10)	18 – Thornton	6 – Mahaffey	5 – Thornton	Kohl Center (14,931); Madison, WI
February 18, 2024; 1:00 p.m., CBS		No. 2 Purdue	W 73–69	15–11 (5–10)	22 – Thornton	4 – 2 tied	3 – Gayle	Value City Arena (18,353); Columbus, OH
February 22, 2024; 8:00 p.m., BTN		at Minnesota	L 79–88	15–12 (5–11)	25 – Thornton	7 – Mahaffey	6 – Thornton	Williams Arena (8,558); Minneapolis, MN
February 25, 2024; 4:00 p.m., CBS		at Michigan State	W 60–57	16–12 (6–11)	14 – Royal	8 – Gayle, Jr.	4 – Thornton	Breslin Center (14,797); East Lansing, MI
February 29, 2024; 6:30 p.m., FS1		Nebraska	W 78–69	17–12 (7–11)	32 – Battle	10 – Gayle, Jr.	3 – 2 tied	Value City Arena (13,090); Columbus, OH
March 3, 2024; 4:00 p.m., CBS		Michigan; Rivalry	W 84–61	18–12 (8–11)	17 – Thornton	6 – Okpara	5 – Thornton	Value City Arena (16,606); Columbus, OH
March 10, 2024; 2:00 p.m., BTN		at Rutgers	W 73–51	19–12 (9–11)	14 – Gayle, Jr.	8 – Okpara	6 – Thornton	Jersey Mike's Arena (8,000); Piscataway, NJ
Big Ten Tournament
March 14, 2024; 6:30 p.m., BTN	(10)	vs. (7) Iowa; Second Round	W 90–78	20–12	23 – Battle	9 – Battle	9 – Thornton	Target Center (12,338); Minneapolis, MN
March 15, 2024; 6:30 p.m., BTN	(10)	vs. (2) No. 13 Illinois; Quarterfinals	L 74–77	20–13	21 – Battle	10 – Okpara	10 – Thornton	Target Center (12,675); Minneapolis, MN
NIT
March 19, 2024; 7:00 p.m., ESPN2	(2)	Cornell; First Round - Wake Forest Bracket	W 88–83	21–13	17 – Battle	8 – Battle	5 – Battle	Value City Arena (4,517); Columbus, OH
March 23, 2024; 7:00 p.m., ESPN+	(2)	(3) Virginia Tech; Second Round - Wake Forest Bracket	W 81–73	22–13	21 – Battle	10 – Battle	7 – Thornton	Value City Arena (7,541); Columbus, OH
March 26, 2024; 7:00 p.m., ESPN	(2)	(4) Georgia; Quarterfinals - Wake Forest Bracket	L 77–79	22–14	22 – Battle	8 – Battle	10 – Thornton	Value City Arena (7,641); Columbus, OH
*Non-conference game. ^{#}Rankings from AP Poll. (#) Tournament seedings in parentheses. All times are in Eastern Time.

== Rankings ==
Ranking movements Legend: ██ Increase in ranking ██ Decrease in ranking — = Not ranked RV = Received votes
	Week																				
Poll	Pre	1	2	3	4	5	6	7	8	9	10	11	12	13	14	15	16	17	18	19	Final
AP	—	—	—	RV	RV	RV	RV	RV	RV	—	—	—	—	—	—	—	—	—	—	—	—
Coaches	RV	—	—	RV	25	RV	RV	RV	RV	RV	—	—	—	—	—	—	—	—	—	—	—
