= Brandon Bailey (basketball) =

American basketball coach

DePaul Blue Demons
- Position: Assistant coach
- League: Big East

Career information
- High school: St. Patrick (Chicago, Illinois)
- Coaching career: 2005–present

Career history

Coaching
- 2017–2019: Maine Red Claws
- 2019–2021: Boston Celtics (assistant)
- 2023–2024: Ohio State (assistant)
- 2024–present: DePaul (assistant)

Brandon Bailey is an American professional basketball coach who is an assistant coach for the DePaul Blue Demons of the Big East Conference.

== Coaching career ==
Bailey worked for Doug Bruno at DePaul University with their women's basketball team between 2005 and 2009. Also, during his summers he was working as a player development intern for Tim Grover at Attack Athletics between 2007 and 2009. Afterwards, he was a graduate assistant for Jerry Wainwright and Oliver Purnell at DePaul men's basketball team from 2009 to 2011.

=== Boston Celtics ===
Bailey began his career with the Boston Celtics in their video department as a video intern in 2011.

On October 6, 2017, it was announced that Bailey has been named the head coach of the Maine Red Claws, the Celtics G League affiliate. He coached Maine for the 2017–18 and 2018–19 seasons.

In July 2019, Bailey was hired as an assistant coach under Brad Stevens with the Boston Celtics. Bailey is currently an assistant coach at DePaul University as of the 2024-2025 season.

== Personal life ==
Bailey is from Chicago and played basketball for his father at St. Patrick High School. Bailey graduated from St. Patrick in 2004.
