= 2024–25 Alabama Crimson Tide women's basketball team =

Intercollegiate basketball season

2024–25 Alabama Crimson Tide women's basketball

Emerald Coast Classic Bay Bracket champions

NCAA tournament, Second round
- Conference: Southeastern Conference

Ranking
- Coaches: No. 21
- AP: No. 20
- Record: 24–9 (10–6 SEC)
- Head coach: Kristy Curry (12th season)
- Assistant coaches: Tennille Adams; Sydney-Anne Cottrell; Kelly Curry; Pauline Love; Colsten Thompson
- Home arena: Coleman Coliseum

2024–25 SEC women's basketball standings
	Conf.				Overall
Team	W		L	PCT	W		L	PCT
No. 2 South Carolina †	15	–	1	.938	35	–	4	.897
No. 5 Texas	15	–	1	.938	35	–	4	.897
No. 10 LSU	12	–	4	.750	31	–	6	.838
No. 13 Kentucky	11	–	5	.688	23	–	8	.742
No. 11 Oklahoma	11	–	5	.688	27	–	8	.771
No. 21 Alabama	10	–	6	.625	24	–	9	.727
No. 25 Ole Miss	10	–	6	.625	22	–	11	.667
Vanderbilt	8	–	8	.500	22	–	11	.667
No. 20 Tennessee	8	–	8	.500	24	–	10	.706
Mississippi State	7	–	9	.438	22	–	12	.647
Florida	5	–	11	.313	19	–	18	.514
Georgia	4	–	12	.250	13	–	19	.406
Arkansas	3	–	13	.188	10	–	22	.313
Auburn	3	–	13	.188	12	–	18	.400
Missouri	3	–	13	.188	14	–	18	.438
Texas A&M	3	–	13	.188	10	–	19	.345
† 2025 SEC tournament winner Rankings from AP poll

The 2024–25 Alabama Crimson Tide women's basketball team represented the University of Alabama during the 2024–25 NCAA Division I women's basketball season. The Crimson Tide, led by twelfth-year head coach Kristy Curry, play their home games at Coleman Coliseum in Tuscaloosa, Alabama and compete as members of the Southeastern Conference (SEC).

== Previous season ==
The Crimson Tide finished the season 24–10 (10–6 SEC) to finish in a tie for fourth in the SEC and received an at-large bid to the NCAA tournament, where they defeated Florida State in the first round before falling to first seed Texas in the second round.

== Offseason ==
=== Departures ===
Alabama departures
Name	Number	Pos.	Height	Year	Hometown	Notes	Ref
Loyal McQueen	0	G	5' 8"	Senior	Florence, SC	Transferred to Clemson	
Meg Newman	42	F	6' 3"	RS Sophomore	Indianapolis, IN	Transferred to DePaul	
Del'Janae Williams	51	G	5' 8"	Graduate student	Detroit, MI	Graduated	

=== 2024 recruiting class ===
College recruiting
Name	Hometown	School	Height	Weight	Commit date
Eris Lester; G	Jacksonville, FL	Montverde Academy	5 ft 11 in (1.80 m)	N/A	
Eris Lester; G	Recruit ratings: ESPN: (95)				
Chloe Spreen; G	Bedford, IN	Bedford North Lawrence HS	5 ft 10 in (1.78 m)	N/A	
Chloe Spreen; G	Recruit ratings: ESPN: (91)				
Leah Brooks; F	Toney, AL	Hazel Green HS	6 ft 3 in (1.91 m)	N/A	
Leah Brooks; F	Recruit ratings: No ratings found				
Overall recruit ranking:
Note: In many cases, Scout, Rivals, 247Sports, On3, and ESPN may conflict in their listings of height and weight.; In these cases, the average was taken. ESPN grades are on a 100-point scale.; Sources:

=== Incoming transfers ===
Alabama incoming transfers
Name	Number	Pos.	Height	Year	Hometown	Previous school
Christabel Ezumah	1	F	6' 2"	Graduate student	Sugar Hill, GA	Campbell
Zaay Green	14	G	6' 2"	Graduate student	Duncanville, TX	Arkansas–Pine Bluff
Diana Collins	20	G	5' 9"	Sophomore	Lilburn, GA	Ohio State

== Roster ==
2024–25 Alabama Crimson Tide women's basketball team
Players
Coaches

Pos.	#	Name	Height	Year	Previous school	Hometown
F	1	Christabel Ezumah	6 ft 2 in (1.88 m)	GS	Lanier HS; Campbell	Sugar Hill, GA
G	2	Chloe Spreen	5 ft 10 in (1.78 m)	Fr	Bedford North Lawrence HS	Bedford, IN
G	3	Sarah Ashlee Barker	6 ft 0 in (1.83 m)	GS	Spain Park HS; Georgia	Birmingham, AL
G	4	Eris Lester	5 ft 11 in (1.8 m)	Fr	Montverde Academy	Jacksonville, FL
G	5	Reychel Douglas	6 ft 0 in (1.83 m)	So	Millbrook HS	Raleigh, NC
C	13	JeAnna Cunningham	6 ft 5 in (1.96 m)	GS	St. Francis Prep; West Virginia	Long Island, NY
G	14	Zaay Green	6 ft 2 in (1.88 m)	GS	Duncanville HS; Arkansas–Pine Bluff	Duncanville, TX
G	20	Diana Collins	5 ft 9 in (1.75 m)	So	Brookwood HS; Ohio State	Lilburn, GA
F	21	Essence Cody	6 ft 4 in (1.93 m)	So	Valdosta HS	Valdosta, GA
G	22	Karly Weathers	5 ft 11 in (1.8 m)	Jr	Loretto HS	Loretto, TN
G	23	Jessica Timmons	5 ft 8 in (1.73 m)	Sr	North Mecklenburg HS; NC State	Charlotte, NC
F	24	Leah Brooks	6 ft 3 in (1.91 m)	Fr	Hazel Green HS	Toney, AL
F	31	Naomi Jones	6 ft 4 in (1.93 m)	So	Jackson HS	Jackson, AL
G/F	32	Aaliyah Nye	6 ft 0 in (1.83 m)	GS	East Lansing HS; Illinois	East Lansing, MI

Head coach

- Kristy Curry (Louisiana–Monroe)

Assistant coach(es)

- Tennille Adams (Arkansas)
- Sydney-Anne Cottrell (Texas A&M–Corpus Christi)
- Kelly Curry (Texas A&M)
- Pauline Love (Southern Miss)
- Colsten Thompson (Alabama–Huntsville)

Legend

- (C) Team captain
- (S) Suspended
- (I) Ineligible
- (W) Walk-on
- Injured
- Current redshirt

Roster
Last update: February 19, 2025

== Schedule and results ==
Date time, TV	Rank^{#}	Opponent^{#}	Result	Record	High points	High rebounds	High assists	Site (attendance) city, state
Exhibition
October 30, 2024*; 6:00 p.m.	No. 24	Columbus State	W 95–62		20 – Barker	9 – Barker	5 – Green	Coleman Coliseum; Tuscaloosa, AL
Non-conference regular season
November 4, 2024*; 5:00 p.m., SECN+/ESPN+	No. 24	New Orleans	W 115–53	1–0	25 – Nye	8 – Barker	6 – Green	Coleman Coliseum (2,710); Tuscaloosa, AL
November 7, 2024*; 7:30 p.m.	No. 24	at Alabama A&M	W 84–59	2–0	19 – Barker	7 – 2 tied	5 – Green	Alabama A&M Events Center (5,639); Huntsville, AL
November 10, 2024*; 2:00 p.m., SECN+/ESPN+	No. 24	Troy	W 94–71	3–0	24 – Green	8 – 2 tied	3 – 2 tied	Coleman Coliseum (2,562); Tuscaloosa, AL
November 13, 2024*; 6:00 p.m., SECN+/ESPN+	No. 22	Norfolk State	W 68–58	4–0	19 – Barker	11 – Weathers	5 – Barker	Coleman Coliseum (2,303); Tuscaloosa, AL
November 14, 2024*; 6:00 p.m., SECN+/ESPN+	No. 22	Alcorn State	W 88–59	5–0	18 – Cody	9 – Ezumah	6 – Green	Coleman Coliseum (2,435); Tuscaloosa, AL
November 17, 2024*; 2:00 p.m., ESPN+	No. 22	at Louisiana–Monroe	W 75–52	6–0	25 – Barker	7 – Barker	4 – Green	Fant–Ewing Coliseum (1,721); Monroe, LA
November 25, 2024*; 1:30 p.m., FloHoops	No. 23	vs. Alabama State; Emerald Coast Classic Bay Bracket semifinals	W 83–33	7–0	15 – Nye	9 – Cunningham	5 – Collins	Raider Arena (200); Niceville, FL
November 26, 2024*; 2:30 p.m., FloHoops	No. 23	vs. Clemson; Emerald Coast Classic Bay Bracket championship game	W 73–39	8–0	17 – Green	9 – Cody	6 – Green	Raider Arena (400); Niceville, FL
December 2, 2024*; 11:00 a.m., SECN+/ESPN+	No. 19	Georgia State	W 98–49	9–0	22 – Green	11 – Cody	7 – Green	Coleman Coliseum (3,125); Tuscaloosa, AL
December 5, 2024*; 8:00 p.m., ESPNU	No. 19	at California; ACC–SEC Challenge	L 65–69	9–1	28 – Green	9 – Weathers	4 – Barker	Haas Pavilion (1,432); Berkeley, CA
December 15, 2024*; 2:00 p.m., SECN+/ESPN+		Murray State	W 90–63	10–1	21 – Barker	9 – Barker	5 – Barker	Coleman Coliseum (2,600); Tuscaloosa, AL
December 20, 2024*; 3:30 p.m., BallerTV		vs. No. 15 Michigan State; West Palm Beach Classic	W 82–67	11–1	18 – Nye	8 – Cody	8 – Weathers	Massimino Court (215); West Palm Beach, FL
December 21, 2024*; 12:15 p.m., BallerTV		vs. Richmond; West Palm Beach Classic	W 75–68	12–1	23 – Barker	6 – Green	5 – Green	Massimino Court (121); West Palm Beach, FL
December 29, 2024*; 11:00 a.m., SECN+/ESPN+	No. 20	Jacksonville	W 93–46	13–1	30 – Nye	8 – Lester	5 – Weathers	Coleman Coliseum (2,175); Tuscaloosa, AL
SEC regular season
January 2, 2025; 6:00 p.m., SECN+/ESPN+	No. 19	Florida	W 79–69	14–1 (1–0)	27 – Green	11 – Cody	6 – Green	Coleman Coliseum (2,516); Tuscaloosa, AL
January 5, 2025; 2:00 p.m., SECN+/ESPN+	No. 19	Missouri	W 68–49	15–1 (2–0)	23 – Green	7 – Cody	6 – Weathers	Coleman Coliseum (2,550); Tuscaloosa, AL
January 9, 2025; 7:00 p.m., SECN+/ESPN+	No. 18	at No. 5 Texas	L 40–84	15–2 (2–1)	7 – Weathers	7 – Green	3 – Weathers	Moody Center (6,680); Austin, TX
January 12, 2025; 3:00 p.m., SECN+/ESPN+	No. 18	at Ole Miss	W 84–78	16–2 (3–1)	32 – Nye	7 – Green	9 – Green	SJB Pavilion (7,844); Oxford, MS
January 16, 2025; 6:00 p.m., SECN+/ESPN+	No. 19	No. 2 South Carolina	L 58–76	16–3 (3–2)	15 – 2 tied	5 – 2 tied	3 – Green	Coleman Coliseum (3,669); Tuscaloosa, AL
January 19, 2025; 3:00 p.m., SECN	No. 19	at Arkansas	W 94–62	17–3 (4–2)	21 – Green	9 – Green	7 – Green	Bud Walton Arena (3,093); Fayetteville, AR
January 26, 2025; 1:00 p.m., SECN	No. 19	Vanderbilt	L 64–66	17–4 (4–3)	36 – Barker	9 – Barker	7 – Green	Coleman Coliseum (2,712); Tuscaloosa, AL
January 30, 2025; 6:00 p.m., SECN	No. 22	at No. 12 Kentucky	L 56–65	17–5 (4–4)	22 – Barker	7 – Barker	5 – Green	Memorial Coliseum (4,471); Lexington, KY
February 2, 2025; 2:00 p.m., SECN+/ESPN+	No. 22	Georgia	W 72–57	18–5 (5–4)	22 – Nye	13 – Cody	8 – Barker	Coleman Coliseum (2,547); Tuscaloosa, AL
February 6, 2025; 6:00 p.m., SECN	No. 23	at Florida	W 84–66	19–5 (6–4)	27 – Nye	10 – Barker	6 – Green	O'Connell Center (1,485); Gainesville, FL
February 9, 2025; 1:00 p.m., SECN	No. 23	at Mississippi State	W 80–60	20–5 (7–4)	19 – Barker	12 – Barker	8 – Barker	Humphrey Coliseum (4,554); Starkville, MS
February 17, 2025; 7:00 p.m., SECN	No. 18	Texas A&M	W 88–49	21–5 (8–4)	18 – Barker	10 – Weathers	6 – Green	Coleman Coliseum (2,434); Tuscaloosa, AL
February 20, 2025; 5:30 p.m., SECN+/ESPN+	No. 18	at No. 15 Tennessee	L 80–88	21–6 (8–5)	22 – Barker	7 – Cody	5 – Barker	Thompson–Boling Arena (10,684); Knoxville, TN
February 23, 2025; 4:00 p.m., SECN	No. 18	Auburn	W 66–50	22–6 (9–5)	29 – Nye	8 – Tied	5 – Barker	Coleman Coliseum (4,340); Tuscaloosa, AL
February 27, 2025; 8:00 p.m., SECN	No. 20	No. 7 LSU	W 88–85 ^{OT}	23–6 (10–5)	28 – Nye	9 – Weathers	5 – Barker	Coleman Coliseum (3,318); Tuscaloosa, AL
March 2, 2025; 1:30 p.m., SECN+/ESPN+	No. 20	at No. 13 Oklahoma	L 84–91	23–7 (10–6)	27 – Green	11 – Weathers	6 – Barker	Lloyd Noble Center (6,502); Norman, OK
SEC tournament
March 6, 2025; 7:30 pm, SECN	(6) No. 19	vs. (11) Florida; Second Round	L 61–63	23–8	24 – Barker	10 – Weathers	10 – Weathers	Bon Secours Wellness Arena; Greenville, SC
NCAA tournament
March 22, 2025*; 12:30 pm, ESPN2	(5 B2) No. 21	vs. (12 B2) Green Bay; First round	W 81–67	24–8	23 – Nye	10 – Tied	8 – Barker	Xfinity Center; College Park, MD
March 24, 2025*; 4:00 pm, ESPN2	(5 B2) No. 21	at (4 B2) No. 18 Maryland; Second round	L 108–111 ^{2OT}	24–9	45 – Barker	8 – Barker	6 – Weathers	Xfinity Center; College Park, MD
*Non-conference game. ^{#}Rankings from AP poll. (#) Tournament seedings in parentheses. B2=Birmingham 2. All times are in Central.

== Rankings ==
Ranking movements Legend: ██ Increase in ranking ██ Decrease in ranking RV = Received votes т = Tied with team above or below
	Week																				
Poll	Pre	1	2	3	4	5	6	7	8	9	10	11	12	13	14	15	16	17	18	19	Final
AP	24	22	24	23	19	RV	RV	20	19	18	19	19	22	23	21	18	20	19	21	21	
Coaches	25	22	21	20	17	22	24	21	20	19т	19	19	22	23	20	19	20	20	21	21	

== See also ==
- 2024–25 Alabama Crimson Tide men's basketball team
