= 2024–25 Oklahoma Sooners women's basketball team =

Intercollegiate basketball season

2024–25 Oklahoma Sooners women's basketball

NCAA tournament, Sweet Sixteen
- Conference: Southeastern Conference

Ranking
- Coaches: No. 11
- AP: No. 11
- Record: 27–8 (11–5 SEC)
- Head coach: Jennie Baranczyk (4th season)
- Associate head coach: Jonas Chatterton (1st season)
- Assistant coaches: Shannon Gage; Tyus Hooks; Markisha Kastantin; Michael Neal
- Home arena: Lloyd Noble Center

2024–25 SEC women's basketball standings
	Conf.				Overall
Team	W		L	PCT	W		L	PCT
No. 2 South Carolina †	15	–	1	.938	35	–	4	.897
No. 5 Texas	15	–	1	.938	35	–	4	.897
No. 10 LSU	12	–	4	.750	31	–	6	.838
No. 13 Kentucky	11	–	5	.688	23	–	8	.742
No. 11 Oklahoma	11	–	5	.688	27	–	8	.771
No. 21 Alabama	10	–	6	.625	24	–	9	.727
No. 25 Ole Miss	10	–	6	.625	22	–	11	.667
Vanderbilt	8	–	8	.500	22	–	11	.667
No. 20 Tennessee	8	–	8	.500	24	–	10	.706
Mississippi State	7	–	9	.438	22	–	12	.647
Florida	5	–	11	.313	19	–	18	.514
Georgia	4	–	12	.250	13	–	19	.406
Arkansas	3	–	13	.188	10	–	22	.313
Auburn	3	–	13	.188	12	–	18	.400
Missouri	3	–	13	.188	14	–	18	.438
Texas A&M	3	–	13	.188	10	–	19	.345
† 2025 SEC tournament winner Rankings from AP poll

The 2024–25 Oklahoma Sooners women's basketball team represented the University of Oklahoma during the 2024–25 NCAA Division I women's basketball season. The Sooners, led by fourth-year head coach Jennie Baranczyk, played their home games at the Lloyd Noble Center and competed as members of the Southeastern Conference (SEC) in their inaugural season in the conference.

== Previous season ==
The Sooners finished the season 23–10 (15–3 Big 12) to finish in first place in the Big 12 in their final season in the conference. They received an at-large bid to the NCAA tournament, where they defeated Florida Gulf Coast before falling to Indiana in the second round.

== Offseason ==
=== Departures ===
Oklahoma Departures
Name	Number	Pos.	Height	Year	Hometown	Notes	Ref
Kennady Tucker	4	G	5'10"	RS Senior	Little Rock, Arkansas	Graduated	
Kayla Cooper	11	G	5'9"	Sophomore	Plano, Texas	Transferred to Southern Illinois	
Jordan Moser	13	F	6'1"	RS Senior	Norman, Oklahoma	Graduated	

=== 2024 recruiting class ===
College recruiting
Name	Hometown	School	Height	Weight	Commit date
Zya Vann; G	Edmond, Oklahoma	Bethany HS	5 ft 9 in (1.75 m)	N/A	
Zya Vann; G	Recruit ratings: ESPN: (94)				
Caya Smith; F	Oklahoma City, Oklahoma	Putnam City West HS	6 ft 4 in (1.93 m)	N/A	
Caya Smith; F	Recruit ratings: ESPN: (93)				
Overall recruit ranking:
Note: In many cases, Scout, Rivals, 247Sports, On3, and ESPN may conflict in their listings of height and weight.; In these cases, the average was taken. ESPN grades are on a 100-point scale.; Sources:

=== Incoming transfer ===
Oklahoma Incoming Transfer
Name	Number	Pos.	Height	Year	Hometown	Previous school
Raegan Beers	52	C	6'4"	Junior	Littleton, Colorado	Oregon State

== Roster ==
2024–25 Oklahoma Sooners women's basketball team
Players
Coaches

Pos.	#	Name	Height	Year	Previous school	Hometown
C	0	Beatrice Culliton	6 ft 3 in (1.91 m)	Jr	Saint Thomas Aquinas HS	Overland Park, KS
G	1	Nevaeh Tot	5 ft 3 in (1.6 m)	GS	John Paul II HS	Columbus, OH
G	2	Reyna Scott	5 ft 10 in (1.78 m)	Jr	Nazareth Regional HS	New York, NY
G	3	Zya Vann	5 ft 9 in (1.75 m)	Fr	Bethany HS	Edmond, OK
F	4	Caya Smith	6 ft 1 in (1.85 m)	Fr	Putnam City West HS	Oklahoma City, OK
F	5	Kiersten Johnson	6 ft 4 in (1.93 m)	Jr	Duncanville HS	Duncanville, TX
F	6	Sahara Williams	5 ft 11 in (1.8 m)	So	West HS	Waterloo, IA
G	12	Payton Verhulst	6 ft 1 in (1.85 m)	Sr	Bishop Miege HS; Louisville	De Soto, KS
G	15	Lexy Keys	5 ft 7 in (1.7 m)	GS	Sequoyah HS; Oklahoma State	Tahlequah, OK
G	20	Aubrey Joens	5 ft 9 in (1.75 m)	GS	Iowa City HS; Iowa State	Iowa City, IA
F	24	Skylar Vann	6 ft 0 in (1.83 m)	GS	Deer Creek HS	Edmond, OK
C	25	Landry Allen	6 ft 3 in (1.91 m)	So	Tuttle HS	Tuttle, OK
F	34	Liz Scott	6 ft 2 in (1.88 m)	GS	Klein Oak HS	Houston, TX
C	52	Raegan Beers	6 ft 4 in (1.93 m)	Jr	Valor Christian HS; Oregon State	Littleton, CO

Head coach

- Jennie Baranczyk (Iowa)

Assistant coach(es)

- Jonas Chatterton (Utah)
- Shannon Gage (Missouri State)
- Tyus Hooks (Ole Miss)
- Markisha Kastantin (Notre Dame)
- Michael Neal (Oklahoma)

Legend

- (C) Team captain
- (S) Suspended
- (I) Ineligible
- (W) Walk-on
- Injured
- Current redshirt

Roster

== Schedule and results ==
Date time, TV	Rank^{#}	Opponent^{#}	Result	Record	High points	High rebounds	High assists	Site (attendance) city, state
Exhibition
October 29, 2024*; 6:00 p.m., SECN+/ESPN+	No. 10	Oklahoma Christian	W 114–47		17 – Williams	15 – Beers	5 – Z. Vann	Lloyd Noble Center (1,083); Norman, OK
Non-conference regular season
November 4, 2024*; 5:00 p.m., SECN+/ESPN+	No. 10	Southern	W 76–44	1–0	21 – Beers	14 – Beers	4 – Verhulst	Lloyd Noble Center (4,886); Norman, OK
November 8, 2024*; 8:00 p.m., SECN	No. 10	Virginia	W 95–51	2–0	26 – Beers	14 – Beers	5 – Verhulst	Lloyd Noble Center (4,012); Norman, OK
November 13, 2024*; 10:30 a.m., SECN+/ESPN+	No. 9	Western Carolina	W 122–56	3–0	27 – Beers	9 – Beers	6 – Tot	Lloyd Noble Center (7,757); Norman, OK
November 19, 2024*; 6:00 p.m., ESPN+	No. 9	at Wichita State	W 79–49	4–0	16 – Verhulst	10 – Beers	6 – Williams	Charles Koch Arena (1,574); Wichita, KS
November 22, 2024*; 8:30 p.m., MW Network	No. 9	at UNLV	W 88–58	5–0	15 – S. Vann	7 – Beers	8 – Tot	Thomas & Mack Center (2,753); Paradise, NV
November 25, 2024*; 4:30 p.m., FloHoops	No. 8	vs. DePaul; Ball Dawgs Classic Semifinal	W 85–62	6–0	18 – Verhulst	9 – L. Scott	9 – Verhulst	Lee's Family Forum; Henderson, NV
November 27, 2024*; 3:30 p.m., FloHoops	No. 8	vs. No. 13 Duke; Ball Dawgs Classic championship	L 99–109 ^{OT}	6–1	29 – Verhulst	10 – Verhulst	10 – Verhulst	Lee's Family Forum; Henderson, NV
December 4, 2024*; 4:00 p.m., ESPN2	No. 11	at No. 22 Louisville; ACC–SEC Challenge	W 78–72	7–1	21 – Verhulst	11 – Beers	4 – Tot	KFC Yum! Center (7,446); Louisville, KY
December 8, 2024*; 1:30 p.m., SECN+/ESPN+	No. 11	Alabama State	W 110–46	8–1	20 – S. Vann	6 – Beers	7 – R. Scott	Lloyd Noble Center (3,191); Norman, OK
December 15, 2024*; 1:30 p.m., SECN+/ESPN+	No. 10	Oral Roberts	W 94–54	9–1	14 – Tied	10 – Beers	5 – Tot	Lloyd Noble Center (4,360); Norman, OK
December 17, 2024*; 8:30 p.m., ESPN2	No. 10	vs. No. 20 Michigan; Jumpman Invitational	W 72–62	10–1	12 – Tied	10 – Beers	4 – S. Vann	Spectrum Center (16,058); Charlotte, NC
December 22, 2024*; 3:00 p.m., SECN+/ESPN+	No. 10	Omaha	W 111–65	11–1	28 – Beers	9 – Beers	8 – S. Vann	Lloyd Noble Center (6,244); Norman, OK
December 29, 2024*; 4:00 p.m., SECN+/ESPN+	No. 9	New Mexico State	W 82–64	12–1	19 – Beers	12 – Beers	6 – Tot	Lloyd Noble Center (6,876); Norman, OK
SEC regular season
January 2, 2025; 8:00 p.m., ESPN2	No. 9	No. 5 Texas	L 73–80	12–2 (0–1)	23 – Verhulst	8 – Verhulst	4 – Verhulst	Lloyd Noble Center (8,039); Norman, OK
January 5, 2025; 2:00 p.m., ESPN	No. 9	at No. 15 Tennessee	W 87–86	13–2 (1–1)	16 – Verhulst	8 – Beers	8 – Tot	Thompson–Boling Arena (11,321); Knoxville, TN
January 9, 2025; 6:30 p.m., SECN+/ESPN+	No. 10	at Mississippi State	L 77–81	13–3 (1–2)	19 – Beers	10 – Beers	6 – Verhulst	Humphrey Coliseum (4,316); Starkville, MS
January 12, 2025; 4:00 p.m., SECN	No. 10	Texas A&M	W 77–62	14–3 (2–2)	16 – Beers	6 – Tied	7 – Verhulst	Lloyd Noble Center (5,010); Norman, OK
January 16, 2025; 6:00 p.m., SECN+/ESPN+	No. 13	Missouri	W 80–63	15–3 (3–2)	38 – Verhulst	4 – Johnson	5 – Tied	Lloyd Noble Center (3,298); Norman, OK
January 19, 2025; 2:00 p.m., ESPN	No. 13	at No. 2 South Carolina	L 60–101	15–4 (3–3)	23 – Beers	8 – Beers	6 – R. Scott	Colonial Life Arena (18,000); Columbia, SC
January 26, 2025; 1:30 p.m., SECN+/ESPN+	No. 15	Georgia	W 86–55	16–4 (4–3)	13 – Tied	11 – Beers	4 – Culliton	Lloyd Noble Center (4,176); Norman, OK
January 30, 2025; 6:00 p.m., ESPN2	No. 13	at No. 7 LSU	L 100–107	16–5 (4–4)	26 – Verhulst	7 – Tied	8 – R. Scott	Pete Maravich Assembly Center (10,637); Baton Rouge, LA
February 2, 2025; 3:00 p.m., SECN	No. 13	No. 12 Kentucky	L 86–95	16–6 (4–5)	27 – Williams	10 – Tied	5 – Verhulst	Lloyd Noble Center (6,008); Norman, OK
February 6, 2025; 6:30 p.m., SECN+/ESPN+	No. 15	at Ole Miss	W 66–56	17–6 (5–5)	19 – Verhulst	10 – Tied	5 – Verhulst	SJB Pavilion (2,720); Oxford, MS
February 10, 2025; 7:00 p.m., SECN	No. 16	Auburn	W 73–71	18–6 (6–5)	20 – S. Vann	8 – Culliton	4 – Tied	Lloyd Noble Center (3,048); Norman, OK
February 16, 2025; 1:00 p.m., SECN	No. 16	at Missouri	W 82–66	19–6 (7–5)	15 – Verhulst	7 – Beers	4 – Verhulst	Mizzou Arena (3,518); Columbia, MO
February 20, 2025; 6:00 p.m., SECN+/ESPN+	No. 16	Vanderbilt	W 101–81	20–6 (8–5)	30 – Beers	14 – Beers	4 – Tied	Lloyd Noble Center (4,073); Norman, OK
February 23, 2025; 2:00 p.m., SECN+/ESPN+	No. 16	at Arkansas	W 94–54	21–6 (9–5)	30 – Beers	7 – Beers	5 – S. Vann	Bud Walton Arena (4,214); Fayetteville, AR
February 27, 2025; 6:00 p.m., SECN+/ESPN+	No. 13	at Florida	W 89–65	22–6 (10–5)	17 – Verhulst	9 – Williams	5 – R. Scott	O'Connell Center (1,928); Gainesville, FL
March 2, 2025; 1:30 p.m., SECN+/ESPN+	No. 13	No. 20 Alabama	W 91–84	23–6 (11–5)	24 – Verhulst	11 – Beers	4 – Tied	Lloyd Noble Center (6,502); Norman, OK
SEC Tournament
March 6, 2025; 12:30 pm, SECN	(5) No. 10	vs. (12) Georgia; Second Round	W 70–52	24–6	22 – Beers	8 – Tied	7 – Verhulst	Bon Secours Wellness Arena; Greenville, SC
March 7, 2025; 1:30 pm, ESPN	(5) No. 10	vs. (4) No. 12 Kentucky; Quarterfinals	W 69–65	25–6	20 – Beers	11 – Beers	4 – S. Vann	Bon Secours Wellness Arena; Greenville, SC
March 8, 2025; 3:30 pm, ESPN2	(5) No. 10	vs. (1) No. 5 South Carolina; Semifinals	L 75–93	25–7	17 – Williams	9 – S. Vann	9 – Verhulst	Bon Secours Wellness Arena; Greenville, SC
NCAA Tournament
March 22, 2025*; 1:30 pm, ESPNU	(3 S4) No. 11	(14 S4) Florida Gulf Coast; First round	W 81–58	26–7	25 – Beers	18 – Beers	6 – Verhulst	Lloyd Noble Center (8,006); Norman, OK
March 24, 2025*; 3:00 pm, ESPN	(3 S4) No. 11	(6 S4) Iowa; Second round	W 96–62	27–7	17 – S. Vann	13 – Beers	4 – Tied	Lloyd Noble Center (8,138); Norman, OK
March 29, 2025*; 4:30 pm, ESPN	(3 S4) No. 11	vs. (2 S4) No. 3 UConn; Sweet Sixteen	L 59–82	27–8	16 – Verhulst	10 – Beers	6 – Scott	Spokane Arena (10,610); Spokane, WA
*Non-conference game. ^{#}Rankings from AP Poll. (#) Tournament seedings in parentheses. S4=Spokane 4. All times are in Central Time.

== Rankings ==
Ranking movements Legend: ██ Increase in ranking ██ Decrease in ranking
	Week																				
Poll	Pre	1	2	3	4	5	6	7	8	9	10	11	12	13	14	15	16	17	18	19	Final
AP	10	9	9	8	11	10	10	9	9	10	13	15	13	15	16	16	13	10	11	11	
Coaches	10	9	9	8	11	11	11	10	10	11	13	15	12	16	17	16	13	10	11	11	

== See also ==
- 2024–25 Oklahoma Sooners men's basketball team
