= 2024–25 Kentucky Wildcats women's basketball team =

Intercollegiate basketball season

2024–25 Kentucky Wildcats women's basketball

NCAA tournament, Second round
- Conference: Southeastern Conference

Ranking
- Coaches: No. 12
- AP: No. 13
- Record: 23–8 (11–5 SEC)
- Head coach: Kenny Brooks (1st season)
- Assistant coaches: Radvile Autukaite; Kendall Dillard; Ciara Gregory; Lindsey Hicks; Josh Petersen
- Home arena: Memorial Coliseum

2024–25 SEC women's basketball standings
	Conf.				Overall
Team	W		L	PCT	W		L	PCT
No. 2 South Carolina †	15	–	1	.938	35	–	4	.897
No. 5 Texas	15	–	1	.938	35	–	4	.897
No. 10 LSU	12	–	4	.750	31	–	6	.838
No. 13 Kentucky	11	–	5	.688	23	–	8	.742
No. 11 Oklahoma	11	–	5	.688	27	–	8	.771
No. 21 Alabama	10	–	6	.625	24	–	9	.727
No. 25 Ole Miss	10	–	6	.625	22	–	11	.667
Vanderbilt	8	–	8	.500	22	–	11	.667
No. 20 Tennessee	8	–	8	.500	24	–	10	.706
Mississippi State	7	–	9	.438	22	–	12	.647
Florida	5	–	11	.313	19	–	18	.514
Georgia	4	–	12	.250	13	–	19	.406
Arkansas	3	–	13	.188	10	–	22	.313
Auburn	3	–	13	.188	12	–	18	.400
Missouri	3	–	13	.188	14	–	18	.438
Texas A&M	3	–	13	.188	10	–	19	.345
† 2025 SEC tournament winner Rankings from AP poll

The 2024–25 Kentucky Wildcats women's basketball team represented the University of Kentucky during the 2024–25 NCAA Division I women's basketball season. The Wildcats, led by first-year head coach Kenny Brooks, play their home games at the Memorial Coliseum and compete as members of the Southeastern Conference (SEC).

== Previous season ==
The Wildcats finished the season 12–20 (4–12 SEC) to finish in twelfth in the SEC. Head coach Kyra Elzy was fired following the season and Virginia Tech head coach Kenny Brooks was hired as her successor.

== Offseason ==
=== Departures ===
Kentucky Departures
Name	Number	Pos.	Height	Year	Hometown	Notes	Ref
Brooklynn Miles	0	G	5'5"	Junior	Frankfort, Kentucky	Transferred to Pittsburgh	
Jordy Griggs	3	G	6'2"	Freshman	Moreno Valley, California	Transferred to Clemson	
Eniya Russell	4	G	6'0"	Senior	Baltimore, Maryland	Transferred to Mississippi State	
Ajae Petty	13	F	6'3"	Senior	Baltimore, Maryland	Transferred to Ohio State	
Amiya Jenkins	20	G	5'10"	Sophomore	Lexington, Kentucky	Transferred to Pittsburgh	
Nyah Leveretter	21	F	6'2"	Senior	Blythewood, South Carolina	Transferred to Georgia	
Maddie Scherr	22	G	5'10"	Senior	Florence, Kentucky	Transferred to TCU	
Emma King	34	G	5'10"	Graduate Student	Stanford, Kentucky	Graduated	
Janae Walker	44	F	6'3"	Freshman	Tyrone, Georgia	Transferred to Rutgers	

=== 2024 recruiting class ===
College recruiting
Name	Hometown	School	Height	Weight	Commit date
Lexi Blue; G	Orlando, Florida	Lake Highland Prep	6 ft 2 in (1.88 m)	N/A	
Lexi Blue; G	Recruit ratings: ESPN: (95)				
Tanah Becker; G	Winnipeg, Manitoba	Hamilton Heights Christian Academy	6 ft 1 in (1.85 m)	N/A	
Tanah Becker; G	Recruit ratings: No ratings found				
Clara Silva; C	Faro, Portugal	Escola Secundária de Fonseca Benevides	6 ft 7 in (2.01 m)	N/A	
Clara Silva; C	Recruit ratings: No ratings found				
Overall recruit ranking:
Note: In many cases, Scout, Rivals, 247Sports, On3, and ESPN may conflict in their listings of height and weight.; In these cases, the average was taken. ESPN grades are on a 100-point scale.; Sources:

=== Incoming transfers ===
Kentucky incoming transfers
Name	Number	Pos.	Height	Year	Hometown	Previous school
Jordan Obi	0	G	6'1"	Graduate Student	Hartford, Connecticut	Penn
Georgia Amoore	3	G	5'6"	Graduate Student	Ballarat, Australia	Virginia Tech
Teonni Key	7	F	6'4"	Junior	Cary, North Carolina	North Carolina
Dazia Lawrence	10	G	5'8"	RS Senior	Greenville, North Carolina	Charlotte
Gabby Brooks	11	G	5'10"	Sophomore	Harrisonburg, Virginia	Virginia Tech
Dominika Paurová	12	G	6'1"	Sophomore	Mladá Boleslav, Czech Republic	Oregon State
Clara Strack	13	C	6'5"	Sophomore	Buffalo, New York	Virginia Tech
Amelia Hassett	32	F	6'3"	Junior	Albury, Australia	Eastern Florida State College

== Roster ==
2024–25 Kentucky Wildcats women's basketball team
Players
Coaches

Pos.	#	Name	Height	Year	Previous school	Hometown
G	0	Jordan Obi	6 ft 1 in (1.85 m)	GS	Choate Rosemary Hall; Penn	Hartford, CT
G	2	Saniah Tyler	5 ft 6 in (1.68 m)	Jr	Incarnate Word Academy	Florissant, MO
G	3	Georgia Amoore	5 ft 6 in (1.68 m)	GS	Loreto College, Victoria; Virginia Tech	Ballarat, Australia
G	4	Lexi Blue	6 ft 2 in (1.88 m)	Fr	Lake Highland Prep	Orlando, FL
G	5	Cassidy Rowe	5 ft 5 in (1.65 m)	Jr	Shelby Valley HS	Virgie, KY
F	7	Teonni Key	6 ft 4 in (1.93 m)	Jr	Cary HS; North Carolina	Cary, NC
G	8	Tanah Becker	6 ft 1 in (1.85 m)	Fr	Hamilton Heights Christian Academy	Winnipeg, MB
G	10	Dazia Lawrence	5 ft 8 in (1.73 m)	RS Sr	Mallard Creek HS; Charlotte	Greenville, NC
G	11	Gabby Brooks	5 ft 10 in (1.78 m)	So	Blacksburg HS; Virginia Tech	Harrisonburg, VA
G	12	Dominika Paurová	6 ft 1 in (1.85 m)	So	DME Academy; Oregon State	Mladá Boleslav, Czech Republic
C	13	Clara Strack	6 ft 5 in (1.96 m)	So	Hamburg HS; Virginia Tech	Buffalo, NY
C	17	Clara Silva	6 ft 7 in (2.01 m)	Fr	Escola Secundária de Fonseca Benevides	Faro, Portugal
F	32	Amelia Hassett	6 ft 3 in (1.91 m)	Jr	Tumut HS; Eastern Florida State College	Albury, Australia

Head coach

- Kenny Brooks (James Madison)

Assistant coach(es)

- Radvile Autukaite (Reinhardt)
- Kendall Dillard (Virginia Tech)
- Ciara Gregory (Charlotte)
- Lindsey Hicks (Purdue)
- Josh Petersen (Florida State)

Legend

- (C) Team captain
- (S) Suspended
- (I) Ineligible
- (W) Walk-on
- Injured
- Current redshirt

Roster

== Schedule and results ==
Date time, TV	Rank^{#}	Opponent^{#}	Result	Record	High points	High rebounds	High assists	Site (attendance) city, state
Non-conference regular season
November 4, 2024*; 5:00 pm, SECN+/ESPN+	No. 22	USC Upstate	W 98–43	1–0	22 – Strack	9 – Tied	10 – Amoore	Memorial Coliseum (4,007); Lexington, KY
November 7, 2024*; 6:00 pm, SECN+/ESPN+	No. 22	Northern Kentucky	W 70–41	2–0	18 – Silva	16 – Hassett	8 – Amoore	Memorial Coliseum (4,188); Lexington, KY
November 12, 2024*; 6:00 pm, SECN+/ESPN+	No. 20	Wofford	W 76–42	3–0	19 – Lawrence	15 – Strack	7 – Amoore	Memorial Coliseum (3,844); Lexington, KY
November 16, 2024*; 6:00 pm, SECN+/ESPN+	No. 20	No. 18 Louisville; Rivalry	W 71–61 ^{OT}	4–0	19 – Amoore	13 – Hassett	9 – Amoore	Memorial Coliseum (6,117); Lexington, KY
November 18, 2024*; 6:00 pm, SECN+/ESPN+	No. 15	Purdue Fort Wayne	W 79–67	5–0	23 – Amoore	10 – Key	7 – Amoore	Memorial Coliseum (4,156); Lexington, KY
November 26, 2024*; 4:30 pm, BallerTV	No. 14	vs. Arizona State; Music City Classic	W 77–61	6–0	24 – Strack	13 – Key	9 – Amoore	Trojan Fieldhouse (611); Nashville, TN
November 27, 2024*; 8:30 pm, BallerTV	No. 14	vs. No. 19 Illinois; Music City Classic	W 76–53	7–0	25 – Strack	15 – Strack	8 – Amoore	Trojan Fieldhouse (368); Nashville, TN
December 5, 2024*; 5:00 pm, ESPN2	No. 14	at No. 16 North Carolina; ACC–SEC Challenge	L 53–72	7–1	17 – Lawrence	13 – Hassett	8 – Amoore	Carmichael Arena (2,816); Chapel Hill, NC
December 9, 2024*; 6:00 pm, SECN+/ESPN+	No. 16	Queens	W 87–45	8–1	20 – Amoore	13 – Key	5 – Lawrence	Memorial Coliseum (4,193); Lexington, KY
December 14, 2024*; 5:00 pm, BTN	No. 16	at Purdue	W 82–52	9–1	22 – Hassett	12 – Strack	6 – Lawrence	Mackey Arena (5,108); West Lafayette, IN
December 20, 2024*; 6:00 pm, SECN+/ESPN+	No. 16	Belmont	W 84–78	10–1	23 – Amoore	11 – Hassett	5 – Tied	Memorial Coliseum (3,887); Lexington, KY
December 28, 2024*; 4:00 pm, SECN+/ESPN+	No. 16	Western Kentucky	W 88–70	11–1	21 – Tied	12 – Tied	9 – Strack	Memorial Coliseum (5,700); Lexington, KY
SEC regular season
January 2, 2025; 7:00 pm, SECN+/ESPN+	No. 16	Mississippi State	W 91–69	12–1 (1–0)	28 – Lawrence	13 – Key	9 – Amoore	Memorial Coliseum (4,493); Lexington, KY
January 5, 2025; 3:00 pm, SECN+/ESPN+	No. 16	at Vanderbilt	W 96–78	13–1 (2–0)	24 – Amoore	15 – Strack	5 – Hassett	Memorial Gymnasium (8,501); Nashville, TN
January 9, 2025; 5:00 pm, SECN	No. 15	at Florida	W 71–55	14–1 (3–0)	18 – Amoore	8 – Strack	4 – Tied	O'Connell Center (1,585); Gainesville, FL
January 12, 2025; 3:00 pm, SECN	No. 15	Auburn	W 80–61	15–1 (4–0)	21 – Tied	7 – Key	11 – Amoore	Memorial Coliseum (4,579); Lexington, KY
January 19, 2025; 2:00 pm, SECN+/ESPN+	No. 12	at Georgia	W 78–64	16–1 (5–0)	25 – Strack	12 – Strack	8 – Amoore	Stegeman Coliseum (3,071); Athens, GA
January 23, 2025; 7:00 pm, SECN	No. 11	at Texas A&M	L 55–61	16–2 (5–1)	20 – Key	9 – Key	5 – Amoore	Reed Arena (3,044); College Station, TX
January 26, 2025; 12:00 pm, SECN	No. 11	Arkansas	W 89–69	17–2 (6–1)	19 – Amoore	11 – Key	8 – Amoore	Memorial Coliseum (4,870); Lexington, KY
January 30, 2025; 7:00 pm, SECN	No. 12	No. 22 Alabama	W 65–56	18–2 (7–1)	16 – Amoore	13 – Strack	9 – Amoore	Memorial Coliseum (4,471); Lexington, KY
February 2, 2025; 4:00 pm, SECN	No. 12	at No. 13 Oklahoma	W 95–86	19–2 (8–1)	43 – Amoore	6 – Tied	8 – Amoore	Lloyd Noble Center (6,008); Norman, OK
February 10, 2025; 7:00 pm, ESPN2	No. 8	at Ole Miss	L 57–66	19–3 (8–2)	18 – Key	10 – Tied	5 – Amoore	SJB Pavilion (2,875); Oxford, MS
February 13, 2025; 7:00 pm, ESPN2	No. 8	No. 3 Texas	L 49–67	19–4 (8–3)	14 – Amoore	10 – Key	3 – Amoore	Memorial Coliseum (5,424); Lexington, KY
February 16, 2025; 2:00 pm, SECN+/ESPN+	No. 8	Georgia	W 84–55	20–4 (9–3)	21 – Amoore	14 – Key	7 – Amoore	Memorial Coliseum (5,625); Lexington, KY
February 20, 2025; 7:30 pm, SECN+/ESPN+	No. 14	at Missouri	W 73–65	21–4 (10–3)	22 – Strack	12 – Strack	5 – Amoore	Mizzou Arena (2,601); Columbia, MO
February 23, 2025; 4:00 pm, ESPN	No. 14	No. 8 LSU	L 58–65	21–5 (10–4)	16 – Amoore	9 – Strack	5 – Amoore	Memorial Coliseum (6,000); Lexington, KY
February 27, 2025; 7:00 pm, SECN	No. 15	No. 11 Tennessee; Rivalry	W 82–58	22–5 (11–4)	23 – Strack	15 – Strack	7 – Amoore	Memorial Coliseum (5,951); Lexington, KY
March 2, 2025; 2:00 pm, ESPN	No. 15	at No. 6 South Carolina	L 66–78	22–6 (11–5)	23 – Strack	8 – Strack	4 – Strack	Colonial Life Arena (18,000); Columbia, SC
SEC Tournament
March 7, 2025; 2:30 pm, ESPN	(4) No. 12	vs. (5) No. 10 Oklahoma; Quarterfinals	L 65–69	22–7	29 – Amoore	16 – Strack	7 – Amoore	Bon Secours Wellness Arena; Greenville, SC
NCAA Tournament
March 21, 2025; 12:00 pm, ESPN	(4 S4) No. 13	(13 S4) Liberty; First round	W 79–78	23–7	34 – Amoore	10 – Strack	8 – Amoore	Memorial Coliseum; Lexington, KY
March 23, 2025; 2:00 pm, ESPN	(4 S4) No. 13	(5 S4) No. 19 Kansas State; Second round	L 79–80 ^{OT}	23–8	22 – Strack	15 – Key	6 – Amoore	Memorial Coliseum (4,218); Lexington, KY
*Non-conference game. ^{#}Rankings from AP Pollregion=S4. (#) Tournament seedings in parentheses. All times are in Eastern Time.

== Rankings ==
Ranking movements Legend: ██ Increase in ranking ██ Decrease in ranking т = Tied with team above or below
	Week																				
Poll	Pre	1	2	3	4	5	6	7	8	9	10	11	12	13	14	15	16	17	18	19	Final
AP	22	20	15	14	14	16	16	16	16	15	12	11	12	11	8	14	15	12	13	13	
Coaches	22	19	16	16	16	16	15	15	16	16	12	11	13	11	13т	14	14	13	12	12	

== See also ==
- 2024–25 Kentucky Wildcats men's basketball team
