= Jake Diebler =

American basketball coach (born 1986)

Current position
- Title: Head coach
- Team: Ohio State
- Conference: Big Ten
- Record: 49–33 (.598)
- Annual salary: $2.5 million

Biographical details
- Born: October 28, 1986 (age 40); Gibsonburg, Ohio, U.S.

Playing career
- 2005–2009: Valparaiso
- Position: Guard

Coaching career (HC unless noted)
- 2009–2010: Valparaiso (SA)
- 2011–2013: Valparaiso (assistant)
- 2016–2019: Vanderbilt (assistant)
- 2019–2022: Ohio State (assistant)
- 2022–2024: Ohio State (AHC)
- 2024: Ohio State (interim HC)
- 2024–present: Ohio State

Administrative career (AD unless noted)
- 2010–2011: Valparaiso (DBO)
- 2013–2016: Ohio State (VC)

Head coaching record
- Overall: 49–33 (.598)
- Tournaments: 0–1 (.000) (NCAA Division I); 2–1 (.667) (NIT)

Jacob Michael Diebler (born October 28, 1986) is an American basketball coach and former player, currently serving as the Buckeyes men's basketball head coach at Ohio State University. He served as an assistant at Ohio State from 2019 to 2024, being named the head coach after the firing of Chris Holtmann in 2024. He has previously served as an assistant at Valparaiso and Vanderbilt.

== Early life and playing career ==
Diebler was born in and grew up in the town of Gibsonburg, Ohio. He went to Fostoria High School for his first three years of high school and played basketball under his father, Keith Diebler. He started playing with his younger brother Jon Diebler starting during his junior year. Before Jake's senior year of high school, Keith Diebler accepted the head coaching position at Upper Sandusky High School, so Jake and Jon went with Keith to play basketball at Upper Sandusky. During his high school career, he accumulated many accolades, including District player of the year in 2003, 2004, and 2005, second team All-State in 2003 and 2004, and the Ohio Division II co-player of the year in 2005, his senior season. He also led Upper Sandusky to win the State Championship and averaged 18.8 points in 2005.

After his senior year, he committed to Valparaiso to play basketball under coach Homer Drew. He played sparingly during his freshman season, only playing 18 games off the bench and averaging only 4.3 minutes per game and 1.1 points per game. His role increased dramatically during his sophomore year, when he started all 31 games for Valparaiso and averaged 32 minutes per game and 5.4 points per game. During his junior season, the team finished 22–14 and went to the 2008 College Basketball Invitational and advanced to the second round with the help of Diebler. Diebler started all 36 games, averaging 30.9 minutes per game and 7.5 points per game. During the offseason, he traveled to West Africa with Athletes in Action. He had his most productive season as a senior, starting every game for the third season in a row and averaging 33.8 minutes per game and 7.5 points per game.

== Coaching career ==
=== Early coaching career ===
Although he initially did not want to become a coach like his father, he eventually decided to pursue coaching during his junior season at Valparaiso. Diebler was first hired by his former college coach Homer Drew to be a student assistant with the team for the 2009–10 season. He was promoted to director of basketball operations for the 2010–11 season. The 2010–11 team won 23 games and was invited to the 2011 CIT tournament, where they lost to Iona in the first round.

He was promoted yet again to assistant coach for Valparaiso to fill the spot of Bryce Drew, who was promoted to head coach due to Homer Drew's retirement. The 2011–12 team finished 22–12, won the Horizon League regular season championship, and made it to the 2012 NIT tournament, marking the second time that Valparaiso had made the National Invitational Tournament. They lost in the first round to Miami (FL). In his second year as assistant coach during the 2012–13 season, Valparaiso went 26–8, won the Horizon League regular season championship for the second year in a row, and also were the 2013 Horizon League tournament champions. They made the NCAA tournament for the first time in 9 years, where they lost in the second round to 3-seed Michigan State. Diebler left Valparaiso before the 2013–14 season to accept a position as the video coordinator for Ohio State under head coach Thad Matta. In his three years at Ohio State, they made 2 NCAA Tournaments while he was there and three winning seasons. He also trained professional basketball players like Aaron Craft, D'Angelo Russell, Evan Turner, Mike Conley, Jared Sullinger, Greg Oden, his brother Jon Diebler, Deshaun Thomas, Byron Mullins, and others.

=== Vanderbilt (assistant) ===
Diebler was hired away from Ohio State by Vanderbilt to serve as an assistant coach, reuniting with former Valparaiso head coach Bryce Drew. With the help of Diebler, the Commodores made the NCAA tournament, losing to Northwestern and finished with a 19–16 record. The next two seasons were losing seasons without postseason appearances, with records of 12–20 and 9–23. This decline of the program led to the coaching staff's firing at the end of the 2018–19 season. The one bright spot for Diebler during his time at Vanderbilt, however, was in his recruiting efforts. He was the primary recruiter for 5–star point guard Darius Garland, who committed to Vanderbilt on November 13, 2017.

=== Ohio State (assistant and associate) ===
Diebler was hired back at Ohio State on April 17, 2019, to serve as an assistant coach under head coach Chris Holtmann, Thad Matta's replacement. With the addition of Diebler before 2019–20 season, Ohio State went 21–10 during the regular season before their first conference tournament game against Purdue was canceled along with the 2020 NCAA tournament was canceled due to the COVID-19 pandemic. Prior to the 2022-23 season, Diebler was promoted to Associate Head Coach.

=== Ohio State ===
==== 2023–24 ====
Holtmann was fired on February 14, 2024, and Diebler was named the interim head coach for the Buckeyes. The Buckeyes went 5-1 under Diebler to finish the regular season, including a win over #2 Purdue in Diebler's first game as interim head coach. As the 10 seed in the 2024 Big Ten men's basketball tournament, Ohio State beat 7 seed Iowa in the second round, before falling to 2 seed Illinois in the quarterfinals.

On March 17, 2024 Diebler was officially named Ohio State's head men's basketball coach.

Selected as a 2 seed in the 2024 National Invitation Tournament, the Buckeyes beat Cornell in the first round and 3 seed Virginia Tech in the second round, before losing to Georgia in the quarterfinals.

== Head coaching record ==
Record table
Season	Team	Overall	Conference	Standing	Postseason
Ohio State Buckeyes (Big Ten Conference) (2024–present)
2023–24	Ohio State	8–3	5–1	T–9th	NIT Quarterfinals
2024–25	Ohio State	17–15	9–11	10th	
2025–26	Ohio State	21–13	12–8	8th	NCAA Division I Round of 64
2026–27	Ohio State	3–2	0–0		
Ohio State:		49–33 (.598)	26–20 (.565)		
Total:		49–33 (.598)			

== Personal life ==
Diebler's father, Keith, and his younger brother, Jon, are both basketball coaches. Diebler and his wife Jordyn have two daughters and a son.
