= Emerald Coast Classic =

College basketball tournament

- Emerald Coast Classic
- Sport: College basketball
- Founded: 2014
- No. of teams: 8 (through 2024); 4 men's, 8 women's (2025)
- Country: United States
- Venue: Raider Arena at Northwest Florida State College
- Website: Emerald Coast Classic

The Emerald Coast Classic is an eight-team college basketball tournament held during Thanksgiving of NCAA Division I men's basketball season, with the inaugural tournament beginning in 2014. The two final round games are played on the campus of Northwest Florida State College in Niceville, Florida. The tournament will be presented by Global Sports. First and second-round games are played at on-campus sites, with the third round and championship round scheduled Thanksgiving weekend at Northwest Florida State College.

== Tournament history ==
=== Tournament champions ===
==== Men's ====
Year	Teams	
2014	Ole Miss	North Carolina Central
2015	Iowa State	Chattanooga
2016	Virginia	Texas–Rio Grande Valley
2017	TCU	Tennessee Tech
2018	Cincinnati	Nicholls State
2019	Florida State	Chattanooga
2020	No Tournament	
2021	LSU	Samford
2022	TCU	Omaha
2023	Ohio State	Western Michigan
2024	No Tournament	
2025	LSU	N/A

==== Women's ====
Year	Teams	
2024	Alabama	Creighton
2025	Mississippi State	Nebraska

== Brackets ==
* – Denotes overtime period

=== 2025 ===
==== Men's ====
The tournament will take place on November 28–29, 2025.

Semifinals; November 28; CBSSN
DePaul	75
Georgia Tech	61
Drake	62
LSU	71

Championship; November 29; CBSSN
DePaul	63
LSU	96
Consolation; November 29
Georgia Tech	74
Drake	84

==== Women's ====
===== Bay bracket =====
Bay Bracket Semifinals; November 24
Providence	48
Middle Tennessee	54
Mississippi State	65
Alcorn State	51

Bay Bracket Championship; November 25
Middle Tennessee	47
Mississippi State	69
Bay Bracket Consolation; November 25
Providence	64
Alcorn State	33

===== Beach bracket =====
Beach Bracket Semifinals; November 24
Nebraska	80
Purdue Fort Wayne	57
Virginia	69
Northwestern State	48

Beach Bracket Championship; November 25
Nebraska	91
Virginia	82
Beach Bracket Consolation; November 25
Purdue Fort Wayne	77
Northwestern State	68

=== 2024 ===
==== Women's ====
The Emerald Coast Classic will be a women's college basketball tournament only for the 2024-25 season with four teams comprised in two brackets.

===== Bay Bracket =====
Bay Bracket Semifinals; November 25
Clemson	90
UAB	52
23	Alabama	83
Alabama State	33

Bay Bracket Championship; November 26
Clemson	39
23	Alabama	73
Bay Bracket Consolation; November 26
UAB	76
Alabama State	43

===== Beach Bracket =====
Beach Bracket Semifinals; November 25
Syracuse	82
Missouri	59
Wichita State	63
Creighton	91

Beach Bracket Championship; November 26
Syracuse	59
Creighton	86
Beach Bracket Consolation; November 26
Missouri	85
Wichita State	57

=== 2023 ===
==== Men's ====
The tournament took place from November 24 - 25, 2023.

First Round; November 17
22	Alabama	98
	Mercer	67

First Round; November 19
Ohio State	73
Western Michigan	56

First Round; November 17
Oregon	92
Tennessee State	67

First Round; November 18
Santa Clara	65
Southeastern Louisiana	63

==== Championship round ====
Second Round; November 24; CBSSN
17	Alabama	81
Ohio State	92
Oregon	82
Santa Clara	88

Championship Round; November 25; CBSSN
Ohio State	86
Santa Clara	56
Consolation; November 25
17	Alabama	99
Oregon	91

Second Round; November 24
Western Michigan	68
Southeastern Louisiana	67
Tennessee State	59
Mercer	60

Championship Round; November 25
Western Michigan	72
Mercer	66
Consolation Game; November 25
Southeastern Louisiana	77
Tennessee State	91

=== 2022 ===
==== Men's ====
The tournament took place on November 25 - 26, 2022.

==== First Round ====
First Round; November 18
California	66
Southern	74

First Round; November 21
Clemson	72
Loyola (MD)	41

First Round; November 21
No. 25 Iowa	100
Omaha	64

First Round; November 17
No. 15 TCU	95
Louisiana–Monroe	60

==== Championship round ====
Second Round; November 25; CBSSN
California	48
TCU	59
Clemson	71
25	Iowa	74

Championship Round; November 26; CBSSN
TCU	79
25	Iowa	66
Consolation; November 26
California	59
Clemson	67

Second Round; November 25
Southern	76
Loyola (MD)	58
Louisiana–Monroe	56
Omaha	63

Championship Round; November 26
Southern	78
Omaha	88
Consolation Game; November 26
Loyola (MD)	65
Louisiana-Monroe	64

=== 2021 ===
==== Men's ====
LSU, Oregon State, Penn State and Wake Forest headline the field for the 2021 Emerald Coast Classic.

First-round games played at on-campus sites. Second- and championship-round games played on the campus of Northwest Florida State College in Niceville, Florida.

==== First Round ====
First Round; November 18
St. Francis Brooklyn	59
Penn State	74

First Round; November 18
McNeese State	46
LSU	85

First Round; November 18
Samford	78
Oregon State	77

First Round; November 20
North Carolina A&T	63
Wake Forest	87

==== Championship round ====
Second Round; November 26; CBSSN
Penn State	63
LSU	68*
Oregon State	77
Wake Forest	80

Championship Round; November 27; CBSSN
LSU	75
Wake Forest	61
Consolation; November 27
Penn State	60
Oregon State	45

Second Round; November 26
McNeese State	71
St. Francis Brooklyn	59
Samford	77
North Carolina A&T	75

Championship Round; November 27
McNeese State	75
Samford	83
Consolation Game; November 27
St. Francis Brooklyn	67
North Carolina A&T	73

=== 2019 ===
==== Championship round ====
Third Round; November 28; CBSSN
Florida State	60
17	Tennessee	57
Purdue	59
20	VCU	56

Championship Round; November 29; CBSSN
Florida State	63
Purdue	60
3rd Place Game; CBSSN
17	Tennessee	72
20	VCU	69

Third Round; November 28; CBSSN
Chicago State	62
Jacksonville State	71
Alabama State	56
Chattanooga	74

Championship Round; November 29; CBSSN
Jacksonville State	60
Chattanooga	63
3rd Place Game; CBSSN
Chicago State	54
Alabama State	67

=== 2018 ===
==== First and Second Round ====
First and second-round games were played at campus sites November 10–20, 2018 with the third round and championship round scheduled for Thanksgiving weekend, November 23 and 25.

November 13		November 19
		Western Michigan	52
North Carolina Central	51	Cincinnati	78
Cincinnati	73

November 17		November 20
		North Carolina Central	63
Southern	65	George Mason	78
George Mason	69

November 10		November 16
		Nicholls State	54
Southern	53	Baylor	81
Baylor	80

November 10		November 20
		Nicholls State	55
Western Michigan	64	Ole Miss	75
Ole Miss	90

==== Championship round ====
Third Round; November 23; CBSSN
George Mason	55
Cincinnati	71
Baylor	70
Ole Miss	78

Championship Round; November 24; CBSSN
Cincinnati	71
Ole Miss	57
3rd place game November 24
George Mason	61
Baylor	72

Third Round; November 23
Nicholls State	77
NC Central	63
Southern	70
Western Michigan	85

Championship Round; November 24
Nicholls State	62
Western Michigan	61*
3rd place game November 24
NC Central	83
Southern	71

=== 2017 ===
==== First and Second Round ====
First and second-round games were played at on-campus sites November 12–21, 2017 with the third round and championship round scheduled for Thanksgiving weekend, November 24 and 25.

November 18; BTN		November 20; BTN
		Jackson State	45
Maryland Eastern Shore	43	Maryland	76
Maryland	96

November 13; Fox Sports Southwest		November 20; Fox Sports Southwest
		Omaha	66
Tennessee Tech	63	TCU	99
TCU	100

November 14		November 21
		Tennessee Tech	104
Omaha	71	New Mexico	96
New Mexico	103

November 18		November 20
		Maryland Eastern Shore	48
Jackson State	58	St. Bonaventure	96
St. Bonaventure	72

==== Championship round ====
Third Round; November 24; CBSSN
New Mexico	67
TCU	69
St. Bonaventure	63
Maryland	61

Championship Round; November 25; CBSSN
TCU	89
St. Bonaventure	79
3rd place game November 25
New Mexico	65
Maryland	80

Third Round; November 25
Tennessee Tech	86
Omaha	85
Maryland Eastern Shore	66
Jackson State	63

Championship Round; November 26
Tennessee Tech	90
Maryland Eastern Shore	60
3rd place game November 25
Omaha	73
Jackson State	75

=== 2016 ===
==== First and Second Round ====
First and second-round games were played at on-campus sites November 13–22, 2016 with the third round and championship round scheduled for Thanksgiving weekend, November 25 and 26.

November 13		November 20
		UT Rio Grande Valley	67
Savannah State	84	Iowa	95
Iowa	116

November 13		November 20
		Savannah State	86
UTRGV	75	Memphis	99
Memphis	95

November 15		November 22
		Grambling State	34
St. Francis Brooklyn	32	Virginia	90
Virginia	95

November 19		November 21
		St. Francis Brooklyn	48
Grambling State	54	Providence	64
Providence	71

==== Championship round ====
Third Round; November 25; CBSSN
8	Virginia	74
Iowa	41
Providence	60
Memphis	51

Championship Round; November 26; CBSSN
8	Virginia	63
Providence	52
3rd place game November 26
Iowa	92
Memphis	100

Third Round; November 25
Savannah State	91
St. Francis Brooklyn	97
Grambling State	93
UT Rio Grande Valley	101*

Championship Round; November 26
St. Francis Brooklyn	61
UT Rio Grande Valley	71
3rd place game November 26
Savannah State	104
Grambling State	110

=== 2015 ===
==== First and Second Round ====
November 14		November 18
		Jacksonville State	62
Alabama State	85	Virginia Tech	71
Virginia Tech	82

November 14		November 18
		Chattanooga	63
Chicago State	64	Iowa State	83
Iowa State	106

November 14		November 18
		Jacksonville State	55
Alabama State	70	UAB	61
UAB	72

November 21; Springfield, Illinois		November 18; Springfield, Illinois
		Chicago State	79
Chattanooga	81	Illinois	82
Illinois	77

==== Championship round ====
Third Round; November 27; CBSSN
Iowa State	99
Virginia Tech	77
UAB	58
Illinois	72

Championship Round; November 28; CBSSN
Iowa State	84
Illinois	73
3rd place game November 28
Virginia Tech	82*
UAB	77

Third Round; November 27
Alabama State	58
Chattanooga	95
Chicago State	65
Jacksonville State	68

Championship Round; November 28
Chattanooga	62
Jacksonville State	52
3rd place game November 28
Alabama State	66
Chicago State	64

=== 2014 ===
==== First and Second Round ====
First and second-round games were played at on-campus sites November 20–25, 2014 with the third round and championship round scheduled for Thanksgiving weekend, November 28 and 29.

November 20		November 23
		Northern Arizona	74
Southern	38	Ole Miss	80
Ole Miss	69

November 22		November 25
		Northern Arizona	53
Southern	48	Middle Tennessee	65
Middle Tennessee	66

November 23		November 25
		Eastern Illinois	53
North Carolina Central	45	Creighton	75
Creighton	65

November 23		November 25
		North Carolina Central	70
Eastern Illinois	49	Cincinnati	79
Cincinnati	54

==== Championship round ====
Third Round; November 28; Emerald Coast TV
Middle Tennessee	51
Cincinnati	69
23	Creighton	68
Ole Miss	75

Semifinals; November 29; CBSSN
Cincinnati	54
Ole Miss	66
3rd place game November 29; Emerald Coast TV
Middle Tennessee	47
23	Creighton	57

Third Round; November 28; Emerald Coast TV
Eastern Illinois	40
North Carolina Central	65
Southern	63
Northern Arizona	70*

Championship Round; November 29; Emerald Coast TV
North Carolina Central	40
Northern Arizona	36
3rd place game November 29; Emerald Coast TV
Eastern Illinois	54
Southern	43

== Future fields ==
=== 2025 men's ===
- DePaul
- Drake
- Georgia Tech
- LSU
