= Attack Athletics =

Sports venue in Chicago, Illinois

Coordinates: 41°52′25″N 87°41′33″W

Attack Athletics was a professional athletic-training facility at 2641 West Harrison Street in Chicago, Illinois. An NCAA tournament guide described it as having four regulation courts. Tim Grover was the sole owner of Attack Athletics, Inc. and Attack Properties LLC, which owned the property. Cornerstone, now part of NELSON Worldwide, was involved in the project.

NBA players including Dwyane Wade and Gilbert Arenas trained at the facility. Attack Athletics' clients included Michael Jordan, Scottie Pippen, and Charles Barkley.

The Chicago Throwbacks announced that they would play their 2007–08 season at Attack Athletics. President Barack Obama played basketball there on Election Day in 2008.

== History ==
The $15 million facility opened in August 2007. The Chicago Sky selected it as the team's practice facility beginning with its 2008 training camp.

The property owner, Attack Properties LLC, defaulted on its development loan, and the lender filed a foreclosure action in 2010. A court-appointed receiver took possession of the property in December 2011. Attack Properties filed for Chapter 11 bankruptcy in April 2012; the bankruptcy case was dismissed that July, and a federal district court upheld the dismissal in September.

The facility operated under the Attack Athletics name until December 2012, after which it became Quest Multisport.
