= Scotty Middleton =

American basketball player (born 2003)

No. 5 – Tulane Green Wave
- Position: Shooting guard / small forward
- League: American Athletic Conference

Personal information
- Born: November 8, 2003 (age 23)
- Listed height: 6 ft 6 in (1.98 m)
- Listed weight: 165 lb (75 kg)

Career information
- High school: Christopher Columbus (Westchester, Florida); The Patrick School (Hillside, New Jersey); Sunrise Christian Academy (Bel Aire, Kansas)
- College: Ohio State (2023–2024); Seton Hall (2024–2025); Tulane (2025–present)

Career highlights
- Jordan Brand Classic (2023)

Scotty Middleton (born November 8, 2003) is an American college basketball player for the Tulane Green Wave. He previously played for the Seton Hall Pirates and the Ohio State Buckeyes.

== Early life and high school career ==
Middleton grew up in Miami, Florida and initially attended Christopher Columbus High School. He transferred to The Patrick School in Hillside, New Jersey after his freshman year. After one year at The Patrick School, Middleton transferred a second time to Sunrise Christian Academy in Bel Aire, Kansas. He averaged 7.8 points per game in National Interscholastic Basketball Conference (NIBC) games in his first season at Sunrise.

=== Recruiting ===
Middleton was rated a four-star recruit by major recruiting services. On August 7, 2022, he committed to playing college basketball for Ohio State over offers from Seton Hall, and UConn.

College recruiting
Name	Hometown	School	Height	Weight	Commit date
Scotty Middleton; SG / SF	Miami, FL	Sunrise Christian Academy (KS)	6 ft 6 in (1.98 m)	180 lb (82 kg)	Aug 7, 2022
Scotty Middleton; SG / SF	Recruit ratings: Rivals: 247Sports: ESPN: (88)				
Overall recruit ranking: Rivals: 55 247Sports: 60 ESPN: 35
Note: In many cases, Scout, Rivals, 247Sports, On3, and ESPN may conflict in their listings of height and weight.; In these cases, the average was taken. ESPN grades are on a 100-point scale.; Sources: "Ohio State 2023 Basketball Commitments". Rivals.; "2023 Ohio State Buckeyes Recruiting Class". ESPN.; "2023 Team Ranking". Rivals.

== College career ==
Middleton enrolled at Ohio State University in June 2023 to take part in summer practices. He averaged 4.4 points and 1.4 rebounds per game in 30 games as a freshman. After the season, Middleton entered the NCAA transfer portal. On April 24, 2024, Middleton transferred to Seton Hall. He averaged 5.8 points and 2.3 rebounds per game. After the season Middleton transferred to Tulane.
