= 2024–25 North Texas Mean Green women's basketball team =

American college basketball season

2024–25 North Texas Mean Green women's basketball
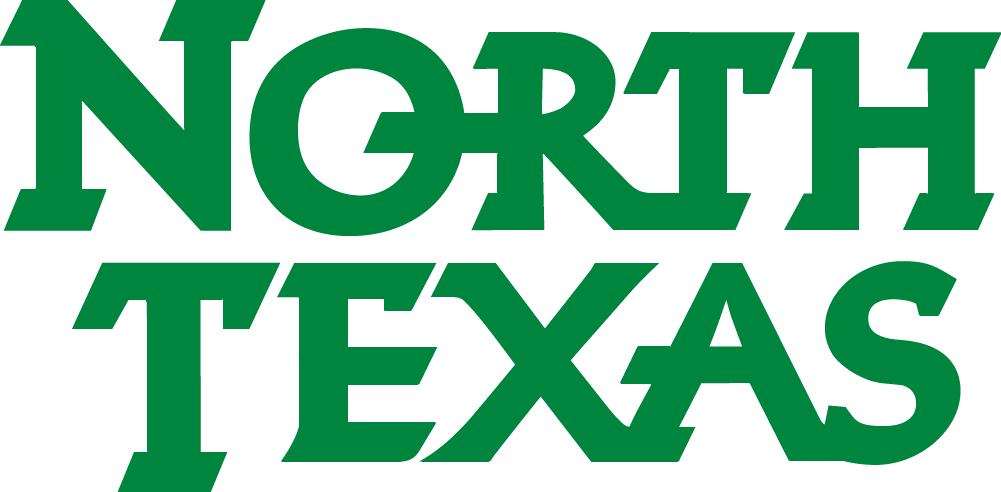

WNIT, Super 16
- Conference: American Athletic Conference
- Record: 25–9 (15–3 AAC)
- Head coach: Jason Burton (2nd season)
- Associate head coach: Britney Brown
- Assistant coaches: Durmon Jennings; Dr. Leah Foster; Princess Davis
- Home arena: The Super Pit

2024–25 American Athletic Conference women's basketball standings
| | Conf. | | | | Overall |
| Team | W | | L | PCT | W | | L | PCT |
|---|---|---|---|---|---|---|---|---|
| UTSA | 17 | – | 1 | .944 | 26 | – | 5 | .839 |
| North Texas | 15 | – | 3 | .833 | 25 | – | 9 | .735 |
| South Florida † | 13 | – | 4 | .765 | 23 | – | 11 | .676 |
| Temple | 13 | – | 5 | .722 | 20 | – | 11 | .645 |
| Tulsa | 11 | – | 7 | .611 | 17 | – | 15 | .531 |
| Tulane | 9 | – | 8 | .529 | 17 | – | 13 | .567 |
| East Carolina | 8 | – | 10 | .444 | 17 | – | 15 | .531 |
| UAB | 7 | – | 11 | .389 | 16 | – | 16 | .500 |
| Rice | 7 | – | 11 | .389 | 17 | – | 17 | .500 |
| Memphis | 5 | – | 13 | .278 | 7 | – | 23 | .233 |
| Wichita State | 4 | – | 14 | .222 | 10 | – | 22 | .313 |
| Charlotte | 4 | – | 14 | .222 | 11 | – | 21 | .344 |
| Florida Atlantic | 3 | – | 15 | .167 | 11 | – | 21 | .344 |
† 2025 AAC tournament winner

The 2024–25 North Texas Mean Green women's basketball team represented the University of North Texas during the 2024–25 NCAA Division I women's basketball season. The Mean Green, who were led by second-year head coach Jason Burton, played their home games at The Super Pit in Denton, Texas as second-year members of the American Athletic Conference.

== Previous season ==
The Mean Green finished the 2023–24 season 23–9, 13–5 in AAC play to finish in a tie a three-way tie for first place. They were upset by #10 seed Rice in the quarterfinals of the AAC tournament. They received an at-large bid to the WBIT, where they would be defeated by TCU in the first round.

== Roster ==
2024–25 North Texas Mean Green women's basketball team
Players
Coaches

| Pos. | # | Name | Height | Year | Previous school | Hometown |
|---|---|---|---|---|---|---|
| G | 2 | Ereauna Hardaway | 5 ft 8 in (1.73 m) | Jr | Jonesboro High School | Jonesboro, Arkansas |
| G | 3 | Desiree Wooten | 5 ft 8 in (1.73 m) | So | Mansfield Timberview High School | Dallas, Texas |
| G | 4 | Jaaucklyn Moore | 5 ft 8 in (1.73 m) | Sr | Incarnate Word | Round Rock, Texas |
| G | 12 | Kyla Deck | 5 ft 9 in (1.75 m) | Jr | Stephen F. Austin | Frisco, Texas |
| G | 14 | Gwendlyn McGrew | 5 ft 10 in (1.78 m) | Fr | Pasadena Memorial High School | Pasadena, Texas |
| G | 20 | Shamaryah Duncan | 5 ft 11 in (1.8 m) | Sr | Wichita State | Waco, Texas |
| G | 21 | Amaya Brannon | 5 ft 11 in (1.8 m) | Sr | Louisiana Tech | Plano, Texas |
| F | 22 | Adhel Tac | 6 ft 0 in (1.83 m) | Sr | UTEP | Garland, Texas |
| F | 23 | Shadasia Brackens | 5 ft 11 in (1.8 m) | So | Fairfield High School | Fairfield, Texas |
| F | 24 | Tommisha Lampkin | 6 ft 2 in (1.88 m) | Sr | Summit High School | Mansfield, Texas |
| G | 30 | Chania Price | 5 ft 11 in (1.8 m) | Fr | Brewer High School | Fort Worth, Texas |
| F | 33 | Jaelyn Talley | 5 ft 10 in (1.78 m) | Jr | Stetson | Fairfax, Virginia |
| F | 35 | Aniyah Johnson | 6 ft 2 in (1.88 m) | Sr | Red Oak High School | Killeen, Texas |

Head coach

- Jason Burton (Austin College)

Assistant coach(es)

- Britney Brown (Oklahoma)
- Durmon Jennings (Indianapolis)
- Dr. Leah Foster (St. Edward's)
- Princess Davis (East Texas A&M)

Legend

- (C) Team captain
- (S) Suspended
- (I) Ineligible
- (W) Walk-on
- Injured
- Current redshirt

Roster
Last update: December 18, 2024

== Schedule and results ==
| Date time, TV | Rank^{#} | Opponent^{#} | Result | Record | High points | High rebounds | High assists | Site (attendance) city, state |
Exhibition
| October 30, 2024*; 6:00 pm | | Midwestern State | W 98–48 | – | 17 – Lampkin | 7 – Brackens | 4 – Tied | The Super Pit (1,523); Denton, TX |
Non-conference regular season
| November 4, 2024*; 6:00 pm, ESPN+ | | Alcorn State | W 84–65 | 1–0 | 27 – Deck | 13 – Lampkin | 3 – Tied | The Super Pit (1,513); Denton, TX |
| November 7, 2024*; 5:30 pm, ESPN+ | | Texas Southern | W 78–54 | 2–0 | 20 – Moore | 12 – Lampkin | 5 – Hardaway | The Super Pit (1,643); Denton, TX |
| November 12, 2024*; 1:00 pm, B1G+ | | at No. 25 Oregon | L 35–66 | 2–1 | 6 – Lampkin | 6 – Lampkin | 2 – Deck | Matthew Knight Arena (4,344); Eugene, OR |
| November 16, 2024*; 12:00 pm, ESPN+ | | at Abilene Christian | W 71–60 | 3–1 | 22 – Lampkin | 13 – Lampkin | 3 – Tied | Moody Coliseum (709); Abilene, TX |
| November 20, 2024*; 6:00 pm, ESPN+ | | Northwestern State | W 62–59 | 4–1 | 17 – Lampkin | 9 – Lampkin | 3 – Wooten | The Super Pit (1,491); Denton, TX |
| November 24, 2024*; 2:00 pm, ESPN+ | | at Houston | W 69–53 | 5–1 | 23 – Wooten | 10 – Lampkin | 5 – Hardaway | Fertitta Center (864); Houston, TX |
| December 1, 2024*; 2:00 pm, MW Network | | at New Mexico | L 58–75 | 5–2 | 10 – Price | 8 – Johnson | 3 – Moore | The Pit (4,489); Albuquerque, NM |
| December 4, 2024*; 11:00 am, ESPN+ | | Tennessee State | W 83–65 | 6–2 | 22 – Lampkin | 10 – Lampkin | 3 – Tied | The Super Pit (2,242); Denton, TX |
| December 7, 2024*; 2:00 pm, ESPN+ | | Southern Illinois | W 87–54 | 7–2 | 21 – Hardaway | 6 – Tied | 4 – Wooten | The Super Pit (1,673); Denton, TX |
| December 15, 2024*; 4:00 pm, ESPN+ | | at Santa Clara | L 58–63 | 7–3 | 25 – Lampkin | 11 – Lampkin | 4 – Hardaway | Leavey Center (163); Santa Clara, CA |
| December 19, 2024*; 6:00 pm, ESPN+ | | SMU; Evan Moore Classic | L 66–74 | 7–4 | 21 – Lampkin | 10 – Lampkin | 4 – Tied | The Super Pit (1,668); Denton, TX |
| December 21, 2024*; 3:00 pm, ESPN+ | | Chicago State; Evan Moore Classic | W 83–57 | 8–4 | 17 – Tied | 11 – Talley | 6 – Hardaway | The Super Pit (1,422); Denton, TX |
AAC regular season
| December 29, 2024; 1:00 pm, ESPN+ | | at Wichita State | W 62–56 | 9–4 (1–0) | 12 – Tied | 14 – Lampkin | 6 – Wooten | Charles Koch Arena (1,083); Wichita, KS |
| January 1, 2025; 4:00 pm, ESPN+ | | Tulsa | W 84–78 | 10–4 (2–0) | 24 – Moore | 7 – Johnson | 4 – Wooten | The Super Pit (1,579); Denton, TX |
| January 4, 2025; 2:00 pm, ESPN+ | | at Memphis | W 73–71 | 11–4 (3–0) | 18 – Hardaway | 13 – Lampkin | 7 – Hardaway | Elma Roane Fieldhouse (1,209); Memphis, TN |
| January 8, 2025; 6:30 pm, ESPN+ | | at Tulane | L 62–65 | 11–5 (3–1) | 23 – Moore | 14 – Johnson | 4 – Moore | Devlin Fieldhouse (555); New Orleans, LA |
| January 11, 2025; 2:00 pm, ESPN+ | | South Florida | W 72–65 | 12–5 (4–1) | 29 – Lampkin | 8 – Lampkin | 4 – Wooten | The Super Pit (1,602); Denton, TX |
| January 15, 2025; 6:30 pm, ESPN+ | | Rice | W 61–53 | 13–5 (5–1) | 17 – Lampkin | 11 – Lampkin | 5 – Hardaway | The Super Pit (1,858); Denton, TX |
| January 18, 2025; 2:00 pm, ESPN+ | | Wichita State | W 80–58 | 14–5 (6–1) | 17 – Tied | 9 – Johnson | 3 – Tied | The Super Pit (2,077); Denton, TX |
| January 25, 2025; 1:00 pm, ESPN+ | | at Florida Atlantic | W 73–61 | 15–5 (7–1) | 18 – Moore | 12 – Johnson | 6 – Hardaway | Eleanor R. Baldwin Arena (718); Boca Raton, FL |
| January 29, 2025; 6:30 pm, ESPN+ | | Temple | W 70–67 | 16–5 (8–1) | 16 – Tied | 10 – Tied | 5 – Lampkin | The Super Pit (1,950); Denton, TX |
| February 1, 2025; 6:00 pm, ESPN+ | | at South Florida | L 53–65 | 16–6 (8–2) | 19 – Lampkin | 15 – Lampkin | 3 – Lampkin | Yuengling Center (2,572); Tampa, FL |
| February 4, 2025; 6:30 pm, ESPN+ | | at UTSA | L 52–54 | 16–7 (8–3) | 17 – Hardaway | 16 – Lampkin | 3 – Hardaway | Convocation Center (1,418); San Antonio, TX |
| February 9, 2025; 1:00 pm, ESPNU/ESPN+ | | Tulane | W 69–64 | 17–7 (9–3) | 16 – Wooten | 10 – Johnson | 4 – Hardaway | The Super Pit (1,803); Denton, TX |
| February 12, 2025; 6:30 pm, ESPN+ | | Memphis | W 97–57 | 18–7 (10–3) | 25 – Wooten | 15 – Lampkin | 4 – Hardaway | The Super Pit (1,852); Denton, TX |
| February 15, 2025; 2:00 pm, ESPN+ | | at Tulsa | W 61–58 | 19–7 (11–3) | 29 – Lampkin | 15 – Lampkin | 4 – Tied | Reynolds Center (1,402); Tulsa, OK |
| February 22, 2025; 1:00 pm, ESPN+ | | at East Carolina | W 75–73 ^{2OT} | 20–7 (12–3) | 23 – Lampkin | 15 – Lampkin | 7 – Hardaway | Williams Arena (1,029); Greenville, NC |
| February 26, 2025; 6:30 pm, ESPN+ | | Charlotte | W 67–58 | 21–7 (13–3) | 16 – Lampkin | 15 – Lampkin | 8 – Hardaway | The Super Pit (1,878); Denton, TX |
| March 1, 2025; 2:00 pm, ESPN+ | | UAB | W 77–56 | 22–7 (14–3) | 27 – Deck | 8 – Johnson | 7 – Hardaway | The Super Pit (2,076); Denton, TX |
| March 4, 2025; 7:00 pm, ESPN+ | | at Rice | W 68-52 | 23-7 (15-3) | 16 – Lampkin | 11 – Lampkin | 6 – Hardaway | Tudor Fieldhouse (794); Houston, TX |
AAC tournament
| March 10, 2025; 6:00 p.m., ESPN+ | (2) | vs. (7) East Carolina; Quarterfinals | W 69–58 | 24–7 | 15 – Lampkin | 12 – Lampkin | 7 – Wooten | Dickies Arena; Fort Worth, TX |
| March 11, 2025; 8:00 p.m., ESPN+ | (2) | vs. (3) South Florida; Semifinals | L 48–58 | 24–8 | 10 – Lampkin | 14 – Lampkin | 2 – Tied | Dickies Arena (2,227); Fort Worth, TX |
WNIT
| March 24, 2025*; 6:00 p.m., ESPN+ | | UT Arlington; Second Round | W 78–67 | 25–8 | 15 – Deck | 5 – Lampkin | 4 – Tied | The Super Pit; Denton, TX |
| March 27, 2025*; 6:00 p.m., ESPN+ | | at Troy; Super 16 | L 86–88 | 25–9 | 26 – Lampkin | 7 – Tied | 6 – Deck | Trojan Arena (1,696); Troy, AL |
*Non-conference game. ^{#}Rankings from AP Poll. (#) Tournament seedings in parentheses. All times are in Central.
