= 2024–25 Wichita State Shockers women's basketball team =

American college basketball season

2024–25 Wichita State Shockers women's basketball
- Conference: American Athletic Conference
- Record: 10–22 (4–14 AAC)
- Head coach: Terry Nooner (2nd season)
- Assistant coaches: Antwain Scales; Brooke Costley; Patrick Harrison
- Home arena: Charles Koch Arena

2024–25 American Athletic Conference women's basketball standings
	Conf.				Overall
Team	W		L	PCT	W		L	PCT
UTSA	17	–	1	.944	26	–	5	.839
North Texas	15	–	3	.833	25	–	9	.735
South Florida †	13	–	4	.765	23	–	11	.676
Temple	13	–	5	.722	20	–	11	.645
Tulsa	11	–	7	.611	17	–	15	.531
Tulane	9	–	8	.529	17	–	13	.567
East Carolina	8	–	10	.444	17	–	15	.531
UAB	7	–	11	.389	16	–	16	.500
Rice	7	–	11	.389	17	–	17	.500
Memphis	5	–	13	.278	7	–	23	.233
Wichita State	4	–	14	.222	10	–	22	.313
Charlotte	4	–	14	.222	11	–	21	.344
Florida Atlantic	3	–	15	.167	11	–	21	.344
† 2025 AAC tournament winner

The 2024–25 Wichita State Shockers women's basketball team represented Wichita State University during the 2024–25 NCAA Division I women's basketball season. The Shockers, led by second-year head coach Terry Nooner, played their home games at Charles Koch Arena in Wichita, Kansas, as members of the American Athletic Conference.

== Previous season ==
The Shockers finished the 2023–24 season 10–22, 5–13 in AAC play to finish in 13th place. They defeated Florida Atlantic, before falling to South Florida in the second round of the AAC tournament.

== Roster ==
2024–25 Wichita State Shockers women's basketball team
Players
Coaches

Pos.	#	Name	Height	Year	Previous school	Hometown
G	0	Taylor Jameson	5 ft 5 in (1.65 m)	GS	George Mason	Wichita, Kansas
G	1	Kyleigh Ortiz	5 ft 6 in (1.68 m)	Jr	Coffeyville Community College	Kansas, Oklahoma
G	2	KP Parr	5 ft 4 in (1.63 m)	Fr	La Vega High School	Waco, Texas
G	3	Princess Anderson	5 ft 7 in (1.7 m)	Jr	Pratt Community College	Beaumont, Texas
F	4	Jayla Murray	6 ft 0 in (1.83 m)	RS Jr	Florida SouthWestern State	St. Louis, Missouri
F	5	Ornella Niankan	6 ft 0 in (1.83 m)	Sr	Odessa College	Montreal, Quebec
G	7	Fiona Diomande	5 ft 11 in (1.8 m)	Fr	Gaspard Monge	Chevilly-Larue, France
G/F	11	Jordan Jackson	6 ft 0 in (1.83 m)	RS So	Texas Woman's	Sachse, Texas
F	12	Bre'Yon White	5 ft 11 in (1.8 m)	Jr	TCU	Pearland, Texas
C	13	Ella Anciaux	6 ft 4 in (1.93 m)	Sr	Kapaun Mt. Carmel High School	Wichita, Kansas
F	14	Carla Budane	5 ft 11 in (1.8 m)	RS Jr	Escola Secundária Vergílio Ferreira	Maputo, Mozambique
C	21	Aicha Ndour	6 ft 6 in (1.98 m)	Sr	Illinois	Somone, Senegal
G	22	Jasmine Peaks	5 ft 6 in (1.68 m)	Jr	Indian River State College	Palm Bay, Florida
F	24	Maimouna Sissoko	6 ft 3 in (1.91 m)	Jr	Cloud County Community College	Bamako, Mali
G	25	Salese Blow	5 ft 10 in (1.78 m)	So	Plano Senior High School	Murphy, Texas

Head coach

- Terry Nooner (Kansas)

Assistant coach(es)

- Antwain Scales (Fort Hays State)
- Brooke Costley (Emporia State)
- Patrick Harrison (Hesston)

Legend

- (C) Team captain
- (S) Suspended
- (I) Ineligible
- (W) Walk-on
- Injured
- Current redshirt

Roster
Last update: December 27, 2024

== Schedule and results ==
Date time, TV	Rank^{#}	Opponent^{#}	Result	Record	High points	High rebounds	High assists	Site (attendance) city, state
Exhibition
July 30, 2024*; 5:30 pm		vs. Regina	W 81–76	–	–	–	–	Sports and Fitness Center; St. Thomas, USVI
July 31, 2024*; 5:30 pm		vs. Regina	W 69–60	–	–	–	–	Sports and Fitness Center; St. Thomas, USVI
October 30, 2024*; 6:00 pm		Northeastern State	W 81–46	–	16 – Jameson	7 – Murray	4 – Jameson	Charles Koch Arena (1,194); Wichita, KS
Non-conference regular season
November 4, 2024*; 11:45 am, ESPN+		Oklahoma Christian	W 66–52	1–0	13 – Jameson	13 – Murray	4 – Murray	Charles Koch Arena (2,571); Wichita, KS
November 9, 2024*; 2:00 pm, ESPN+		Belmont	L 55–75	1–1	16 – Blow	7 – White	4 – Blow	Charles Koch Arena (1,187); Wichita, KS
November 13, 2024*; 6:00 pm, ESPN+		Missouri State	L 77–82	1–2	17 – Blow	9 – White	7 – Jameson	Charles Koch Arena (1,045); Wichita, KS
November 16, 2024*; 2:00 pm, ESPN+		St. Thomas	W 69–64	2–2	18 – Jameson	10 – White	6 – Jameson	Charles Koch Arena (986); Wichita, KS
November 19, 2024*; 6:00 pm, ESPN+		No. 9 Oklahoma	L 49–79	2–3	14 – Murray	7 – Jameson	2 – Tied	Charles Koch Arena (1,574); Wichita, KS
November 25, 2024*; 7:30 pm, FloHoops		vs. Creighton; Emerald Coast Classic Beach Bracket Semifinals	L 63–91	2–4	16 – Murray	5 – White	7 – Jameson	The Arena at NFSC (450); Niceville, FL
November 26, 2024*; 5:00 pm, FloHoops		vs. Missouri; Emerald Coast Classic Beach Bracket Consolation	L 57–85	2–5	9 – Tied	7 – Anciaux	2 – Tied	The Arena at NFSC (300); Niceville, FL
December 2, 2024*; 6:00 pm, ESPN+		Prairie View A&M	W 74–45	3–5	17 – Tied	8 – White	4 – Tied	Charles Koch Arena (910); Wichita, KS
December 5, 2024*; 6:30 pm, ESPN+		at Kansas	L 60–70	3–6	16 – Anderson	9 – Anciaux	3 – Tied	Allen Fieldhouse (3,201); Lawrence, KS
December 8, 2024*; 1:00 pm, ESPN+		Western Kentucky	W 64–59	4–6	13 – Blow	11 – White	3 – Blow	Charles Koch Arena (1,563); Wichita, KS
December 15, 2024*; 4:00 pm, ESPN+		at Loyola Marymount	W 68–56	5–6	14 – Tied	7 – Ndour	4 – Tied	Gersten Pavilion (293); Los Angeles, CA
December 18, 2024*; 4:00 pm, ESPN+		at Cal State Bakersfield	W 100–69	6–6	23 – Blow	7 – Anciaux	5 – Parr	Icardo Center (171); Bakersfield, CA
December 21, 2024*; 2:00 pm		at Oral Roberts	L 65–77	6–7	13 – Anderson	8 – Ndour	3 – Blow	Mabee Center (2,727); Tulsa, OK
AAC regular season
December 29, 2024; 1:00 pm, ESPN+		North Texas	L 56–62	6–8 (0–1)	17 – Jameson	9 – White	2 – Niankan	Charles Koch Arena (1,083); Wichita, KS
January 1, 2025; 3:00 pm, ESPN+		at Memphis	L 83–93	6–9 (0–2)	11 – Tied	10 – Sissoko	3 – Tied	Elma Roane Fieldhouse (1,064); Memphis, TN
January 4, 2025; 5:00 pm, ESPN+		at UAB	W 82–70	7–9 (1–2)	24 – Tied	9 – Murray	6 – Peaks	Bartow Arena (362); Birmingham, AL
January 8, 2025; 6:00 pm, ESPN+		South Florida	L 46–72	7–10 (1–3)	15 – Murray	7 – Sissoko	3 – Ndour	Charles Koch Arena (809); Wichita, KS
January 11, 2025; 12:00 pm, ESPN+		at UTSA	L 51–69	7–11 (1–4)	22 – Jameson	4 – Murray	4 – Murray	Convocation Center (1,000); San Antonio, TX
January 15, 2025; 6:00 pm, ESPN+		Tulane	L 75–85	7–12 (1–5)	20 – Blow	7 – Peaks	8 – Peaks	Charles Koch Arena (956); Wichita, KS
January 18, 2025; 2:00 pm, ESPN+		at North Texas	L 58–80	7–13 (1–6)	13 – Anderson	5 – Ndour	4 – Murray	The Super Pit (2,077); Denton, TX
January 25, 2025; 2:00 pm, ESPN+		UAB	L 73–76	7–14 (1–7)	20 – Murray	11 – Murray	4 – Peaks	Charles Koch Arena (1,179); Wichita, KS
January 29, 2025; 5:00 pm, ESPN+		at East Carolina	L 62–72	7–15 (1–8)	19 – Murray	8 – Sissoko	4 – Peaks	Williams Arena (1,004); Greenville, NC
February 1, 2025; 2:00 pm, ESPN+		at Tulsa	L 42–56	7–16 (1–9)	18 – Murray	8 – Murray	2 – Blow	Reynolds Center (1,387); Tulsa, OK
February 5, 2025; 6:00 pm, ESPN+		Florida Atlantic	W 54–44	8–16 (2–9)	18 – Murray	8 – White	5 – Jameson	Charles Koch Arena (993); Wichita, KS
February 8, 2025; 1:00 pm, ESPN+		UTSA	L 49–60	8–17 (2–10)	15 – Blow	7 – Murray	3 – Murray	Charles Koch Arena (1,334); Wichita, KS
February 12, 2025; 5:30 pm, ESPN+		at Charlotte	L 59–73	8–18 (2–11)	21 – Anderson	5 – White	4 – Tied	Dale F. Halton Arena (454); Charlotte, NC
February 15, 2025; 2:00 pm, ESPN+		Rice	W 60–57	9–18 (3–11)	18 – Jameson	13 – Ndour	3 – Tied	Charles Koch Arena (1,233); Wichita, KS
February 19, 2025; 6:00 pm, ESPN+		at Temple	L 51–70	9–19 (3–12)	20 – Anderson	7 – Ndour	5 – White	Liacouras Center (1,392); Philadelphia, PA
February 22, 2025; 2:00 pm, ESPN+		at Tulane	L 64–68	9–20 (3–13)	25 – Anderson	7 – Murray	4 – Tied	Devlin Fieldhouse (713); New Orleans, LA
March 1, 2025; 2:00 pm, ESPN+		Charlotte	W 62–43	10–20 (4–13)	13 – Blow	8 – Murray	3 – Peaks	Charles Koch Arena (1,037); Wichita, KS
March 4, 2025; 6:00 pm, ESPN+		Tulsa	L 46–58	10–21 (4–14)	17 – Blow	7 – Niankan	3 – Parr	Charles Koch Arena (1,109); Wichita, KS
AAC tournament
March 9, 2025; 8:00 p.m., ESPN+	(6)	vs. (11) Tulane; Second round	L 63–69	10–22	30 – Blow	6 – Anciaux	4 – Parr	Dickies Arena (2,393); Fort Worth, TX
*Non-conference game. ^{#}Rankings from AP Poll. (#) Tournament seedings in parentheses. All times are in Central.
