= 2024–25 East Carolina Pirates women's basketball team =

American college basketball season

2024–25 East Carolina Pirates women's basketball
- Conference: American Athletic Conference
- Record: 17–15 (8–10 AAC)
- Head coach: Kim McNeill (6th season)
- Assistant coaches: Jason Harris; Tamoria Holmes; Jeffrey Williams
- Home arena: Williams Arena

2024–25 American Athletic Conference women's basketball standings
	Conf.				Overall
Team	W		L	PCT	W		L	PCT
UTSA	17	–	1	.944	26	–	5	.839
North Texas	15	–	3	.833	25	–	9	.735
South Florida †	13	–	4	.765	23	–	11	.676
Temple	13	–	5	.722	20	–	11	.645
Tulsa	11	–	7	.611	17	–	15	.531
Tulane	9	–	8	.529	17	–	13	.567
East Carolina	8	–	10	.444	17	–	15	.531
UAB	7	–	11	.389	16	–	16	.500
Rice	7	–	11	.389	17	–	17	.500
Memphis	5	–	13	.278	7	–	23	.233
Wichita State	4	–	14	.222	10	–	22	.313
Charlotte	4	–	14	.222	11	–	21	.344
Florida Atlantic	3	–	15	.167	11	–	21	.344
† 2025 AAC tournament winner

The 2024–25 East Carolina Pirates women's basketball team represented East Carolina University during the 2024–25 NCAA Division I women's basketball season. The Pirates, led by sixth-year head coach Kim McNeill, played their home games at Williams Arena at Minges Coliseum in Greenville, North Carolina, as members of the American Athletic Conference.

== Previous season ==
The Pirates finished the 2023–24 season 19–14, 9–9 in AAC play to finish in a five-way tie for sixth place. They defeated Memphis, upset top-seeded Tulsa, and UTSA before falling to Rice in the AAC tournament championship game.

== Roster ==
2024–25 East Carolina Pirates women's basketball team
Players
Coaches

Pos.	#	Name	Height	Year	Previous school	Hometown
F	00	Taliyah Wyche	6 ft 3 in (1.91 m)	Sr	Florida	Fort Lauderdale, Florida
G	1	Journee McDaniel	5 ft 9 in (1.75 m)	Jr	East Tennessee State	New Bern, North Carolina
F	2	Tatyana Wyche	6 ft 2 in (1.88 m)	Sr	Florida	Fort Lauderdale, Florida
G	3	Timia Ware	5 ft 6 in (1.68 m)	Sr	UCF	Chicago, Illinois
G	4	Synia Johnson	5 ft 9 in (1.75 m)	GS	Riverdale Baptist School	Waldorf, Maryland
G	5	Jayla Hearp	5 ft 9 in (1.75 m)	RS So	Smithfield High School	Hampton, Virginia
G	7	Devin Hagemann	5 ft 6 in (1.68 m)	Fr	Detroit Edison Academy	Detroit, Michigan
F	8	Khloe Miller	6 ft 3 in (1.91 m)	Fr	Wake Young Women's Leadership Academy	Raleigh, North Carolina
G	11	Khia Miller	5 ft 10 in (1.78 m)	So	Sidwell Friends School	Woodbridge, Virginia
G/F	12	Morgan Moseley	5 ft 11 in (1.8 m)	GS	St. James School	Centreville, Maryland
G	14	Bobbi Smith	5 ft 11 in (1.8 m)	Jr	Southeast Raleigh High School	Garner, North Carolina
G/F	20	Jade Tillman	5 ft 10 in (1.78 m)	So	Good Counsel High School	Rockville, Maryland
F	22	Anzhané Hutton	6 ft 0 in (1.83 m)	GS	UCF	Dallas, Texas
F	23	Amiya Joyner	6 ft 2 in (1.88 m)	Jr	Farmville Central High School	Farmville, North Carolina
G	24	Kimora Jenkins	6 ft 1 in (1.85 m)	Sr	Georgia	Long Island, New York

Head coach

- Kim McNeill (Richmond)

Assistant coach(es)

- Jason Harris (Fordham)
- Tamoria Holmes (Howard)
- Jeffrey Williams (Howard)

Legend

- (C) Team captain
- (S) Suspended
- (I) Ineligible
- (W) Walk-on
- Injured
- Current redshirt

Roster
Last update: December 20, 2024

== Schedule and results ==
Date time, TV	Rank^{#}	Opponent^{#}	Result	Record	High points	High rebounds	High assists	Site (attendance) city, state
Non-conference regular season
November 6, 2024*; 6:00 pm, ESPN+		Charleston Southern	W 81–56	1–0	21 – Hearp	10 – Tal. Wyche	4 – Johnson	Williams Arena (987); Greenville, NC
November 10, 2024*; 2:00 pm, ESPN+		at James Madison	L 51–57	1–1	15 – Hearp	12 – Joyner	2 – Joyner	Atlantic Union Bank Center (2,298); Harrisonburg, VA
November 14, 2024*; 6:00 pm, ESPN+		Furman	W 67–51	2–1	14 – Hearp	10 – Joyner	3 – Hagemann	Williams Arena (884); Greenville, NC
November 17, 2024*; 2:00 pm, SECN+		at No. 1 South Carolina	L 44–95	2–2	25 – Joyner	10 – Joyner	3 – Hagemann	Colonial Life Arena (18,000); Columbia, SC
November 20, 2024*; 11:00 am, ESPN+		Howard	W 65–44	3–2	32 – Joyner	15 – Joyner	3 – Tied	Williams Arena (6,865); Greenville, NC
November 27, 2024*; 5:30 pm		vs. Montana State; UNLV Thanksgiving Classic	L 56–62	3–3	13 – Hearp	7 – Moseley	4 – Hearp	Thomas & Mack Center (949); Paradise, NV
November 29, 2024*; 5:30 pm, MW Network		at UNLV; UNLV Thanksgiving Classic	L 49–64	3–4	11 – Joyner	5 – Tied	3 – Johnson	Thomas & Mack Center (906); Paradise, NV
December 8, 2024*; 1:00 pm, ESPN+		Elon	W 60–43	4–4	24 – Khi. Miller	8 – Joyner	4 – Johnson	Williams Arena (1,157); Greenville, NC
December 12, 2024*; 11:00 am, FloHoops		at Hampton	W 79–47	5–4	16 – Joyner	10 – Joyner	5 – Johnson	Hampton Convocation Center (727); Hampton, VA
December 15, 2024*; 3:30 pm, ESPN+		at Old Dominion	W 59–58 ^{OT}	6–4	27 – Joyner	17 – Joyner	4 – Tied	Chartway Arena (1,756); Norfolk, VA
December 18, 2024*; 6:00 pm, ESPN+		VCU	W 48–46	7–4	9 – Tal. Wyche	6 – Tal. Wyche	5 – Johnson	Williams Arena (1,086); Greenville, NC
December 21, 2024*; 12:00 pm, ESPN+		UNC Wilmington	W 71–56	8–4	30 – Joyner	16 – Joyner	4 – Tied	Williams Arena (1,308); Greenville, NC
AAC regular season
December 29, 2024; 3:00 pm, ESPN+		at Tulsa	L 84–93	8–5 (0–1)	21 – Hearp	9 – Wyche	7 – Smith	Reynolds Center (1,251); Tulsa, OK
January 1, 2025; 4:00 pm, ESPN+		at Temple	L 58–63	8–6 (0–2)	19 – Hearp	10 – Hutton	3 – Johnson	Liacouras Center (432); Philadelphia, PA
January 4, 2025; 1:00 pm, ESPN+		Florida Atlantic	L 48–64	8–7 (0–3)	15 – Joyner	9 – Joyner	3 – Tied	Williams Arena (1,335); Greenville, NC
January 11, 2025; 2:00 pm, ESPN+		Tulane	W 75–64	9–7 (1–3)	21 – Hagemann	12 – Joyner	9 – Miller	Williams Arena (1,022); Greenville, NC
January 15, 2025; 6:30 pm, ESPN+		at Charlotte	W 72–65	10–7 (2–3)	21 – Hutton	12 – Hutton	6 – Hagemann	Dale F. Halton Arena (780); Charlotte, NC
January 18, 2025; 3:00 pm, ESPN+		at Rice	L 56–65	10–8 (2–4)	16 – Hutton	9 – Hutton	2 – Tied	Tudor Fieldhouse (833); Houston, TX
January 22, 2025; 6:00 pm, ESPN+		Temple	L 52–69	10–9 (2–5)	17 – Joyner	11 – Joyner	3 – Joyner	Williams Arena (861); Greenville, NC
January 25, 2025; 4:00 pm, ESPN+		South Florida	L 60–63	10–10 (2–6)	16 – Miller	9 – Wyche	4 – Tied	Williams Arena (1,116); Greenville, NC
January 29, 2025; 6:00 pm, ESPN+		Wichita State	W 72–62	11–10 (3–6)	17 – Joyner	13 – Joyner	6 – Hagemann	Williams Arena (1,004); Greenville, NC
February 1, 2025; 3:00 pm, ESPN+		at Memphis	L 69–75	11–11 (3–7)	20 – Hutton	7 – Tied	6 – Hagemann	Elma Roane Fieldhouse (981); Memphis, TN
February 5, 2025; 7:00 pm, ESPN+		at UAB	W 61–56	12–11 (4–7)	22 – Joyner	11 – Joyner	5 – Hagemann	Bartow Arena (436); Birmingham, AL
February 8, 2025; 2:00 pm, ESPN+		Tulsa	W 73–64	13–11 (5–7)	21 – Joyner	8 – Hutton	8 – Hagemann	Williams Arena (1,643); Greenville, NC
February 12, 2025; 7:30 pm, ESPN+		at UTSA	L 46–60	13–12 (5–8)	18 – Joyner	8 – Tied	2 – Tied	Convocation Center (1,000); San Antonio, TX
February 15, 2025; 2:00 pm, ESPN+		Charlotte	W 63–45	14–12 (6–8)	14 – Joyner	12 – Joyner	3 – Joyner	Williams Arena (1,525); Greenville, NC
February 22, 2025; 2:00 pm, ESPN+		North Texas	L 73–75 ^{2OT}	14–13 (6–9)	20 – Miller	20 – Joyner	4 – Ware, Wyche, Johnson	Williams Arena (1,029); Greenville, NC
February 26, 2025; 7:00 pm, ESPN+		at Florida Atlantic	W 80–70	15–13 (7–9)	18 – Miller	10 – Joyner	2 – Hutton	Eleanor R. Baldwin Arena (910); Boca Raton, FL
March 1, 2025; 7:00 pm, ESPN+		at South Florida	W 66–57	16–13 (8–9)	23 – Joyner	11 – Joyner	2 – Tied	Yuengling Center (2,664); Tampa, FL
March 4, 2025; 6:00 pm, ESPN+		UTSA	L 48–67	16–14 (8–10)	10 – Hearp	5 – Joyner	2 – Tied	Williams Arena (952); Greenville, NC
AAC tournament
March 9, 2025; 7:00 pm, ESPN+	(7)	vs. (10) Memphis; Second round	W 64–45	17–14	21 – Joyner	11 – Joyner	5 – Tied	Dickies Arena; Fort Worth, TX
March 10, 2025; 7:00 pm, ESPN+	(7)	vs. (2) North Texas; Quarterfinals	L 58–69	17–15	18 – Joyner	13 – Joyner	3 – Hagemann	Dickies Arena; Fort Worth, TX
*Non-conference game. ^{#}Rankings from AP Poll. (#) Tournament seedings in parentheses. All times are in Eastern.
