= 2024–25 Charlotte 49ers women's basketball team =

American college basketball season

2024–25 Charlotte 49ers women's basketball
- Conference: American Athletic Conference
- Record: 11–21 (4–14 AAC)
- Head coach: Tomekia Reed (1st season)
- Assistant coaches: LaShonda Cousin; Chase Campbell; Jonathan Williams; AD Durr
- Home arena: Dale F. Halton Arena

2024–25 American Athletic Conference women's basketball standings
	Conf.				Overall
Team	W		L	PCT	W		L	PCT
UTSA	17	–	1	.944	26	–	5	.839
North Texas	15	–	3	.833	25	–	9	.735
South Florida †	13	–	4	.765	23	–	11	.676
Temple	13	–	5	.722	20	–	11	.645
Tulsa	11	–	7	.611	17	–	15	.531
Tulane	9	–	8	.529	17	–	13	.567
East Carolina	8	–	10	.444	17	–	15	.531
UAB	7	–	11	.389	16	–	16	.500
Rice	7	–	11	.389	17	–	17	.500
Memphis	5	–	13	.278	7	–	23	.233
Wichita State	4	–	14	.222	10	–	22	.313
Charlotte	4	–	14	.222	11	–	21	.344
Florida Atlantic	3	–	15	.167	11	–	21	.344
† 2025 AAC tournament winner

The 2024–25 Charlotte 49ers women's basketball team represented the University of North Carolina at Charlotte during the 2024–25 NCAA Division I women's basketball season. The 49ers, led by first-year head coach Tomekia Reed, played their home games at Dale F. Halton Arena in Charlotte, North Carolina as second-year members of the American Athletic Conference (AAC).

== Previous season ==
The 49ers finished the 2023–24 season 16–15, 9–9 in AAC play, to finish in a five-way tie for sixth place. They were upset by Tulane in the second round of the AAC tournament.

On April 17, 2024, it was announced that head coach Cara Consuegra would be stepping down from her position, in order to take the head coaching position at Marquette. On April 25, the school announced that they would be hiring Jackson State head coach Tomekia Reed as the team's new head coach.

== Roster ==
2024–25 Charlotte 49ers women's basketball team
Players
Coaches

Pos.	#	Name	Height	Year	Previous school	Hometown
G	1	Jordan Peete	5 ft 6 in (1.68 m)	GS	Stetson	St. Louis, MO
G	2	Kay Kay Green	5 ft 6 in (1.68 m)	GS	Texas A&M	Chicago, IL
G	4	Alexis Andrews	5 ft 8 in (1.73 m)	Jr	College of Charleston	Montgomery, AL
G	5	Nia Young	6 ft 0 in (1.83 m)	RS Jr	Leesville Road High School	Raleigh, NC
C	7	Jayla Kelly	6 ft 3 in (1.91 m)	GS	UCF	St. Louis, MO
G	11	Madison Roshelle	5 ft 11 in (1.8 m)	Sr	Jackson State	Cincinnati, OH
G	12	Imani Smith	5 ft 8 in (1.73 m)	Sr	Gulf Coast State	Hiram, GA
C	15	Daphane White	6 ft 5 in (1.96 m)	GS	Jackson State	Gulfport, MS
G/F	22	Caroline Thiel	6 ft 0 in (1.83 m)	So	Rocky Mount High School	Rocky Mount, NC
G	23	Hayleigh Breland	5 ft 8 in (1.73 m)	Jr	Jackson State	Wiggins, MS
F	24	Aanaya Harris	5 ft 11 in (1.8 m)	Sr	Xavier	Omaha, NE
F	31	Keanna Rembert	6 ft 2 in (1.88 m)	RS Jr	Illinois	Raleigh, NC
F	40	Tena Ikidi	6 ft 3 in (1.91 m)	Sr	Northern Colorado	Bayelsa, Nigeria

Head coach

- Tomekia Reed (Georgia Southwestern State)

Assistant coach(es)

- LaShonda Cousin (Mississippi State)
- Chase Campbell (Paine College)
- Jonathan Williams (Faulkner)
- AD Durr (Louisville)

Legend

- (C) Team captain
- (S) Suspended
- (I) Ineligible
- (W) Walk-on
- Injured
- Current redshirt

Roster
Last update: December 27, 2024

== Schedule and results ==
Date time, TV	Rank^{#}	Opponent^{#}	Result	Record	High points	High rebounds	High assists	Site (attendance) city, state
Exhibition
October 30, 2024*; 6:30 p.m.		Newberry	W 78–40	–	–	–	–	Dale F. Halton Arena; Charlotte, NC
Non-conference regular season
November 4, 2024*; 5:30 p.m., ESPN+		Presbyterian	W 77–63	1–0	13 – Breland	6 – Breland	5 – Breland	Dale F. Halton Arena; Charlotte, NC
November 7, 2024*; 6:30 p.m., ESPN+		Wake Forest	L 41–60	1–1	12 – Andrews	8 – 2 tied	3 – Green	Dale F. Halton Arena (804); Charlotte, NC
November 12, 2024*; 6:00 p.m., B1G+		at No. 12 Ohio State	L 53–94	1–2	15 – Andrews	4 – Rembert	4 – Green	Value City Arena (4,531); Columbus, OH
November 15, 2024*; 6:30 p.m., ESPN+		at UNC Asheville	W 59–47	2–2	15 – Green	9 – Breland	3 – Breland	Kimmel Arena (316); Asheville, NC
November 18, 2024*; 6:30 p.m., ESPN+		Charleston Southern	L 59–63	2–3	13 – Rembert	7 – Breland	4 – Breland	Dale F. Halton Arena (559); Charlotte, NC
November 21, 2024*; 6:30 p.m., ESPN+		Gardner–Webb	W 83–67	3–3	30 – Breland	9 – Kelly	5 – Green	Dale F. Halton Arena (560); Charlotte, NC
November 29, 2024*; 12:00 p.m., ACCNX		at Miami (FL); Miami Thanksgiving Tournament	L 63–79	3–4	14 – Roshelle	7 – Roshelle	5 – Green	Watsco Center (2,205); Coral Gables, FL
December 1, 2024*; 12:00 p.m.		vs. Southeastern Louisiana; Miami Thanksgiving Tournament	L 53–62	3–5	13 – Rembert	14 – Rembert	4 – Breland	Watsco Center (107); Coral Gables, FL
December 5, 2024*; 11:00 a.m., ESPN+		at Mercer	W 43–42	4–5	12 – Rembert	8 – Rembert	4 – Green	Hawkins Arena (931); Macon, GA
December 16, 2024*; 11:00 a.m., ESPN+		Winthrop	W 55–47	5–5	16 – Breland	7 – Breland	3 – Green	Dale F. Halton Arena (2,055); Charlotte, NC
December 21, 2024*; 12:00 p.m., ESPN+		at Davidson	L 55–82	5–6	12 – Green	7 – Rembert	3 – Green	John M. Belk Arena (712); Davidson, NC
AAC regular season
December 29, 2024; 2:00 p.m., ESPN+		UTSA	L 50–64	5–7 (0–1)	21 – Breland	8 – Kelly	2 – Andrews	Dale F. Halton Arena (705); Charlotte, NC
January 1, 2025; 7:00 p.m., ESPN+		at South Florida	L 68–69 ^{OT}	5–8 (0–2)	15 – Rembert	6 – 2 tied	4 – Breland	Yuengling Center (1,987); Tampa, FL
January 4, 2025; 4:00 p.m., ESPN+		Tulane	L 58–79	5–9 (0–3)	13 – Kelly	9 – Rembert	5 – Breland	Dale F. Halton Arena (662); Charlotte, NC
January 8, 2025; 7:30 p.m., ESPN+		at Tulsa	L 70–76	5–10 (0–4)	18 – Green	12 – Breland	3 – 2 tied	Reynolds Center (1,122); Tulsa, OK
January 15, 2025; 6:30 p.m., ESPN+		East Carolina	L 65–72	5–11 (0–5)	17 – Andrews	6 – Kelly	4 – Kelly	Dale F. Halton Arena (780); Charlotte, NC
January 18, 2025; 2:00 p.m., ESPN+		at Temple	L 62–80	5–12 (0–6)	17 – Roshelle	5 – Breland	4 – Smith	Liacouras Center (1,490); Philadelphia, PA
January 22, 2025; 7:00 p.m., ESPN+		at Florida Atlantic	W 75–68	6–12 (1–6)	13 – Roshelle	7 – Rembert	6 – Breland	Eleanor R. Baldwin Arena (422); Boca Raton, FL
January 25, 2025; 4:00 p.m., ESPN+		Rice	L 60–84	6–13 (1–7)	14 – Andrews	9 – Rembert	4 – Green	Dale F. Halton Arena (668); Charlotte, NC
January 29, 2025; 8:00 p.m., ESPN+		at Memphis	W 67–59	7–13 (2–7)	17 – Rembert	10 – 2 tied	6 – Green	Elma Roane Fieldhouse (1,083); Memphis, TN
February 5, 2025; 6:30 p.m., ESPN+		Tulsa	L 53-81	7–14 (2–8)	12 – Rembert	9 – Rembert	4 – Green	Dale F. Halton Arena (595); Charlotte, NC
February 8, 2025; 3:00 p.m., ESPN+		at UAB	L 80–86	7–15 (2–9)	20 – 2 tied	8 – Breland	8 – Breland	Bartow Arena (431); Birmingham, AL
February 12, 2025; 6:30 p.m., ESPN+		Wichita State	W 73–59	8–15 (3–9)	27 – Andrews	6 – Kelly	4 – 2 tied	Dale F. Halton Arena (454); Charlotte, NC
February 15, 2025; 2:00 p.m., ESPN+		at East Carolina	L 45–63	8–16 (3–10)	17 – Rembert	4 – 4 tied	4 – Kelly	Williams Arena (1,525); Greenville, NC
February 18, 2025; 6:30 p.m., ESPN+		South Florida	L 52–70	8–17 (3–11)	14 – 2 tied	6 – 2 tied	1 – 5 tied	Dale F. Halton Arena (478); Charlotte, NC
February 22, 2025; 2:00 p.m., ESPN+		Florida Atlantic	W 58–53	9–17 (4–11)	16 – Thiel	7 – 3 tied	3 – 2 tied	Dale F. Halton Arena (715); Charlotte, NC
February 26, 2025; 7:30 p.m., ESPN+		at North Texas	L 58–67	9–18 (4–12)	19 – Breland	10 – Rembert	4 – Kelly	The Super Pit (1,878); Denton, TX
March 1, 2025; 3:00 p.m., ESPN+		at Wichita State	L 43–62	9–19 (4–13)	13 – Rembert	9 – Rembert	3 – 2 tied	Charles Koch Arena (1,037); Wichita, KS
March 4, 2025; 6:30 p.m., ESPN+		Temple	L 54–60	9–20 (4–14)	16 – Rembert	9 – Kelly	2 – 2 tied	Dale F. Halton Arena (557); Charlotte, NC
AAC tournament
March 8, 2025; 1:00 p.m., ESPN+	(12)	vs. (13) Florida Atlantic; First round	W 55–51	10–20	16 – Rembert	6 – Rembert	3 – Green	Dickies Arena (259); Fort Worth, TX
March 9, 2025; 3:00 p.m., ESPN+	(12)	vs. (5) Tulsa; Second round	W 71–66	11–20	23 – Breland	9 – Smith	3 – 3 tied	Dickies Arena (2,446); Fort Worth, TX
March 10, 2025; 3:00 p.m., ESPN+	(12)	vs. (4) Temple; Quarterfinals	L 34–65	11–21	13 – Andrews	8 – Smith	2 – Green	Dickies Arena (1,961); Fort Worth, TX
*Non-conference game. ^{#}Rankings from AP poll. (#) Tournament seedings in parentheses. All times are in Eastern.
