= 2024–25 UAB Blazers women's basketball team =

American college basketball season

2024–25 UAB Blazers women's basketball

WNIT, First Round
- Conference: American Athletic Conference
- Record: 16–16 (7–11 AAC)
- Head coach: Randy Norton (12th season)
- Associate head coach: Taren Martin
- Assistant coaches: Kayla Alexander; Trista Magee Whitman; Mary Dunn; Miyah Barnes
- Home arena: Bartow Arena

2024–25 American Athletic Conference women's basketball standings
	Conf.				Overall
Team	W		L	PCT	W		L	PCT
UTSA	17	–	1	.944	26	–	5	.839
North Texas	15	–	3	.833	25	–	9	.735
South Florida †	13	–	4	.765	23	–	11	.676
Temple	13	–	5	.722	20	–	11	.645
Tulsa	11	–	7	.611	17	–	15	.531
Tulane	9	–	8	.529	17	–	13	.567
East Carolina	8	–	10	.444	17	–	15	.531
UAB	7	–	11	.389	16	–	16	.500
Rice	7	–	11	.389	17	–	17	.500
Memphis	5	–	13	.278	7	–	23	.233
Wichita State	4	–	14	.222	10	–	22	.313
Charlotte	4	–	14	.222	11	–	21	.344
Florida Atlantic	3	–	15	.167	11	–	21	.344
† 2025 AAC tournament winner

The 2024–25 UAB Blazers women's basketball team represented the University of Alabama at Birmingham during the 2024–25 NCAA Division I women's basketball season. The Blazers, led by 12th-year head coach Randy Norton, played their home games at the Bartow Arena in Birmingham, Alabama as second year members of the American Athletic Conference.

== Previous season ==
The Blazers finished the 2023–24 season 18–14, 9–9 in AAC play to finish in a five-way tie for sixth place. They were defeated by eventual tournament champions Rice in the second round of the AAC tournament. They received an at-large bid into the WNIT, where they would fall to Southern Miss in the first round.

== Roster ==
2024–25 UAB Blazers women's basketball team
Players
Coaches

Pos.	#	Name	Height	Year	Previous school	Hometown
F	0	Rayne Tucker	6 ft 1 in (1.85 m)	GS	Temple	New Carrollton, Maryland
G	1	Eleecia Carter	5 ft 7 in (1.7 m)	RS Fr	Chattanooga	Winter Garden, Florida
G	3	Journey Armstead	5 ft 8 in (1.73 m)	Jr	Hutchinson Community College	Tulsa, Oklahoma
G	4	Desiree Ware	5 ft 8 in (1.73 m)	Jr	Minnetonka High School	Brooklyn Park, Minnesota
G	10	Riley Talbert	5 ft 10 in (1.78 m)	Fr	Bishop Kenny High School	Amelia Island, Florida
G	11	Genevive Wedemeyer	5 ft 8 in (1.73 m)	So	Putnam Science Academy	Hamburg, Germany
F	12	Molly Moffitt	6 ft 1 in (1.85 m)	Jr	Putnam Science Academy	Seattle, Washington
F	13	Valentina Monzo	6 ft 2 in (1.88 m)	Sr	McCook Community College	Santiago, Chile
G	21	Maddie Walsh	6 ft 2 in (1.88 m)	GS	Arrowhead Union High School	Hartland, Wisconsin
G	22	Ashton Elley	5 ft 10 in (1.78 m)	Jr	Little Rock Christian Academy	Little Rock, Arkansas
F	23	Jade Weathersby	6 ft 2 in (1.88 m)	So	Brookwood High School	Aurora, Colorado
F	24	Tracey Bershers	6 ft 2 in (1.88 m)	Jr	Oklahoma State	Fort Smith, Arkansas
F	33	Sara Bershers	6 ft 0 in (1.83 m)	GS	UT Rio Grande Valley	Fort Smith, Arkansas
G	34	Cali Smallwood	5 ft 9 in (1.75 m)	So	Montevallo	Blountsville, Alabama

Head coach

- Randy Norton (Iowa)

Assistant coach(es)

- Taren Martin (Illinois State)
- Kayla Alexander (UAB)
- Trista Magee Whitman (UAB)
- Mary Dunn (Youngstown State)
- Miyah Barnes (UAB)

Legend

- (C) Team captain
- (S) Suspended
- (I) Ineligible
- (W) Walk-on
- Injured
- Current redshirt

Roster
Last update: December 18, 2024

== Schedule and results ==
Date time, TV	Rank^{#}	Opponent^{#}	Result	Record	Site (attendance) city, state
Exhibition
October 30, 2024*; 8:00 pm		Shorter	W 72–64	–	Bartow Arena; Birmingham, AL
Non-conference regular season
November 4, 2024*; 12:00 pm, ESPN+		West Alabama	W 78–47	1–0	Bartow Arena (470); Birmingham, AL
November 12, 2024*; 5:30 pm		at Alabama A&M	W 74–67	2–0	AAMU Events Center (1,065); Huntsville, AL
November 16, 2024*; 2:00 pm, ESPN+		Mississippi Valley State	W 92–66	3–0	Bartow Arena (360); Birmingham, AL
November 20, 2024*; 6:30 pm, ESPN+		at Jacksonville State	L 56–68	3–1	Pete Mathews Coliseum (1,020); Jacksonville, AL
November 25, 2024*; 11:00 am, FloHoops		vs. Clemson; Emerald Coast Classic Bay Bracket Semifinals	L 52–90	3–2	The Arena at NWFSC (250); Niceville, FL
November 26, 2024*; 11:00 am, FloHoops		vs. Alabama State; Emerald Coast Classic Bay Bracket Consolation	W 76–43	4–2	The Arena at NWFSC (200); Niceville, FL
December 1, 2024*; 11:00 am, ESPN+		Southern Miss	W 87–66	5–2	Bartow Arena (233); Birmingham, AL
December 8, 2024*; 2:00 pm, SECN+		at Auburn	L 62–69	5–3	Neville Arena (4,008); Auburn, AL
December 15, 2024*; 1:00 pm, ESPN+		Alcorn State	W 76–51	6–3	Bartow Arena (287); Birmingham, AL
December 18, 2024*; 11:00 am, ESPN+		New Orleans	W 66–60	7–3	Bartow Arena (984); Birmingham, AL
December 20, 2024*; 6:30 pm, ESPN+		at Illinois State	W 71–68	8–3	CEFCU Arena (1,532); Normal, IL
December 22, 2024*; 12:00 pm, ESPN+		at Southern Illinois	W 75–57	9–3	Banterra Center; Carbondale, IL
AAC regular season
December 29, 2024; 2:00 pm, ESPN+		Temple	L 74–97	9–4 (0–1)	Bartow Arena (305); Birmingham, AL
January 1, 2025; 6:30 pm, ESPN+		at UTSA	L 56–67	9–5 (0–2)	Convocation Center (917); San Antonio, TX
January 4, 2025; 5:00 pm, ESPN+		Wichita State	L 70–82	9–6 (0–3)	Bartow Arena (362); Birmingham, AL
January 8, 2025; 6:00 pm, ESPN+		Memphis	W 73–56	10–6 (1–3)	Bartow Arena (270); Birmingham, AL
January 11, 2025; 1:00 pm, ESPN+		at Florida Atlantic	W 73–61	11–6 (2–3)	Eleanor R. Baldwin Arena (463); Boca Raton, FL
January 14, 2025; 6:00 pm, ESPN+		at South Florida	W 62–61	12–6 (3–3)	Yuengling Center (2,066); Tampa, FL
January 18, 2025; 1:00 pm, ESPN+		UTSA	L 63–73	12–7 (3–4)	Bartow Arena (322); Birmingham, AL
January 22, 2025; 6:00 pm, ESPN+		Rice	W 63–56 ^{OT}	13–7 (4–4)	Bartow Arena (397); Birmingham, AL
January 25, 2025; 2:00 pm, ESPN+		at Wichita State	W 76–73 ^{OT}	14–7 (5–4)	Charles Koch Arena (1,179); Wichita, KS
February 1, 2025; 2:00 pm, ESPN+		at Tulane	L 55–72	14–8 (5–5)	Devlin Fieldhouse (708); New Orleans, LA
February 5, 2025; 6:00 pm, ESPN+		East Carolina	L 56–61	14–9 (5–6)	Bartow Arena (436); Birmingham, AL
February 8, 2025; 2:00 pm, ESPN+		Charlotte	W 86–80	15–9 (6–6)	Bartow Arena (431); Birmingham, AL
February 11, 2025; 5:00 pm, ESPN+		at Temple	L 53–63	15–10 (6–7)	Liacouras Center (1,319); Philadelphia, PA
February 19, 2025; 7:00 pm, ESPN+		at Memphis	L 71–80	15–11 (6–8)	Elma Roane Fieldhouse (688); Memphis, TN
February 22, 2025; 2:00 pm, ESPN+		Tulsa	L 68–72 ^{OT}	15–12 (6–9)	Bartow Arena (302); Birmingham, AL
February 25, 2025; 7:00 pm, ESPN+		at Rice	L 48–73	15–13 (6–10)	Tudor Fieldhouse (703); Houston, TX
March 1, 2025; 2:00 pm, ESPN+		at North Texas	L 56–77	15–14 (6–11)	The Super Pit (2,076); Denton, TX
March 4, 2025; 6:00 pm, ESPN+		Tulane	W 66–64	16–14 (7–11)	Bartow Arena (310); Birmingham, AL
AAC tournament
March 9, 2025; 12:00 pm, ESPN+	(8)	vs. (9) Rice; Second Round	L 63–76	16–15	Dickies Arena; Fort Worth, TX
WNIT
March 21, 2025*; 7:00 pm, ESPN+		at UIC; First Round	L 48–63	16–16	Credit Union 1 Arena (382); Chicago, IL
*Non-conference game. ^{#}Rankings from AP Poll. (#) Tournament seedings in parentheses. All times are in Central.
