= 2024–25 Tulsa Golden Hurricane women's basketball team =

American college basketball season

2024–25 Tulsa Golden Hurricane women's basketball

WNIT, First Round
- Conference: American Athletic Conference
- Record: 17–15 (11–7 AAC)
- Head coach: Angie Nelp (4th season)
- Assistant coaches: Doug Brotherton; Chelsea Dungee; Rachel Travis; John McCullough
- Home arena: Reynolds Center

2024–25 American Athletic Conference women's basketball standings
	Conf.				Overall
Team	W		L	PCT	W		L	PCT
UTSA	17	–	1	.944	26	–	5	.839
North Texas	15	–	3	.833	25	–	9	.735
South Florida †	13	–	4	.765	23	–	11	.676
Temple	13	–	5	.722	20	–	11	.645
Tulsa	11	–	7	.611	17	–	15	.531
Tulane	9	–	8	.529	17	–	13	.567
East Carolina	8	–	10	.444	17	–	15	.531
UAB	7	–	11	.389	16	–	16	.500
Rice	7	–	11	.389	17	–	17	.500
Memphis	5	–	13	.278	7	–	23	.233
Wichita State	4	–	14	.222	10	–	22	.313
Charlotte	4	–	14	.222	11	–	21	.344
Florida Atlantic	3	–	15	.167	11	–	21	.344
† 2025 AAC tournament winner

The 2024–25 Tulsa Golden Hurricane women's basketball team represented the University of Tulsa during the 2024–25 NCAA Division I women's basketball season. The Golden Hurricane, led by fourth-year head coach Angie Nelp, played their home games at the Reynolds Center in Tulsa, Oklahoma as members of the American Athletic Conference (AAC).

== Previous season ==
The Golden Hurricane finished the 2023–24 season 25–10, 13–5 in AAC play, to finish in a tie a three-way tie for first place. As the top seed in the AAC tournament, they were upset by #9 seed East Carolina in the quarterfinals. They received an automatic bid to the WBIT, where they defeated Arkansas in the first round and Georgetown in the second round, before falling to eventual tournament champions Illinois in the quarterfinals.

== Roster ==
2024–25 Tulsa Golden Hurricane women's basketball team
Players
Coaches

Pos.	#	Name	Height	Year	Previous school	Hometown
G	1	Cam Mathews	5 ft 7 in (1.7 m)	Jr	Keller High School	Keller, TX
G	2	Kristol Ayson	5 ft 8 in (1.73 m)	Sr	Jacksonville State	Tacoma, WA
F	4	Lexie Foutch	6 ft 3 in (1.91 m)	Sr	Fort Gibson High School	Fort Gibson, OK
G	5	Delanie Crawford	5 ft 11 in (1.8 m)	Sr	Piedmont High School	Piedmont, OK
F	6	Brynn Eshoo	6 ft 2 in (1.88 m)	Fr	William Fremd High School	Inverness, IL
G	7	Paige Bradley	5 ft 10 in (1.78 m)	RS Jr	TCU	Dallas, TX
G	13	Brooklyn Alexander	6 ft 1 in (1.85 m)	Fr	C.E. King High School	Houston, TX
F	15	Jade Clack	6 ft 1 in (1.85 m)	So	TCU	Buda, TX
G	20	Tobi Ademuwagun	5 ft 11 in (1.8 m)	RS Fr	Penn	Houston, TX
G/F	21	Hadley Periman	6 ft 2 in (1.88 m)	Jr	Tuttle High School	Tuttle, OK
G	22	Mady Cartwright	5 ft 10 in (1.78 m)	So	Greenwood High School	Greenwood, AR
F	23	Whitney Sullivan	6 ft 3 in (1.91 m)	Fr	Orangeville High School	Orangeville, IL
G	24	Elise Hill	5 ft 7 in (1.7 m)	So	Holland Hall High School	Tulsa, OK
G	32	McKayla Miller	6 ft 1 in (1.85 m)	So	Creighton	Cimarron, KS
G	33	Kennedi Alexander	6 ft 1 in (1.85 m)	Fr	C.E. King High School	Houston, TX

Head coach

- Angie Nelp (Colorado State)

Assistant coach(es)

- Doug Brotherton (Central Michigan)
- Chelsea Dungee (Arkansas)
- Rachel Travis (Northwest)
- John McCullough (Oklahoma)

Legend

- (C) Team captain
- (S) Suspended
- (I) Ineligible
- (W) Walk-on
- Injured
- Current redshirt

Roster
Last update: December 26, 2024

== Schedule and results ==
Date time, TV	Rank^{#}	Opponent^{#}	Result	Record	High points	High rebounds	High assists	Site (attendance) city, state
Non-conference regular season
November 6, 2024*; 6:30 p.m., ESPN+		Arkansas–Pine Bluff	W 63–60	1–0	19 – Crawford	6 – tied	2 – Hill	Reynolds Center (1,355); Tulsa, OK
November 10, 2024*; 2:00 p.m., ESPN+		at Missouri State	L 61–63	1–1	12 – Hill	5 – tied	3 – tied	Great Southern Bank Arena (1,803); Springfield, MO
November 17, 2024*; 2:00 p.m., ESPN+		Oral Roberts; PSO Mayor's Cup	L 56–67	1–2	13 – tied	9 – Clack	2 – tied	Reynolds Center (1,880); Tulsa, OK
November 21, 2024*; 4:00 p.m., NBCS FAST		vs. Georgia; State Farm WBCA Showcase	L 44–60	1–3	14 – Crawford	9 – Crawford	3 – Ayson	State Farm Field House; Bay Lake, FL
November 23, 2024*; 11:00 a.m., NBCS FAST		vs. Marshall; State Farm WBCA Showcase	L 80–84 ^{OT}	1–4	26 – Crawford	10 – Bradley	3 – Bradley	State Farm Field House (735); Bay Lake, FL
November 27, 2024*; 6:30 p.m., ESPN+		Chicago State	W 76–46	2–4	25 – Crawford	13 – Crawford	6 – Bradley	Reynolds Center (1,300); Tulsa, OK
December 1, 2024*; 1:00 p.m., ESPN2/ESPN+		Creighton	L 59–81	2–5	15 – Crawford	6 – Hill	2 – tied	Reynolds Center (2,043); Tulsa, OK
December 5, 2024*; 11:00 a.m., ESPN+		Grambling State	W 77–60	3–5	18 – tied	8 – Periman	5 – Hill	Reynolds Center (3,067); Tulsa, OK
December 10, 2024*; 8:00 p.m., MW Network		at San Jose State	W 77–48	4–5	17 – Bradley	10 – Cartwright	6 – Crawford	Provident Credit Union Event Center (235); San Jose, CA
December 15, 2024*; 2:00 p.m., ESPN+		Kansas City	W 89–61	5–5	20 – Periman	11 – Periman	7 – Crawford	Reynolds Center (1,471); Tulsa, OK
December 20, 2024*; 11:00 a.m., BallerTV		vs. Montana; West Palm Beach Classic	W 68–58	6–5	26 – Crawford	9 – Periman	6 – Hill	Massimino Court (124); West Palm Beach, FL
December 21, 2024*; 10:00 a.m., BallerTV		vs. No. 18 Tennessee; West Palm Beach Classic	L 61–102	6–6	17 – Crawford	11 – Periman	3 – tied	Massimino Court (274); West Palm Beach, FL
AAC regular season
December 29, 2024; 2:00 p.m., ESPN+		East Carolina	W 93–84	7–6 (1–0)	36 – Crawford	7 – Crawford	5 – Bradley	Reynolds Center (1,251); Tulsa, OK
January 1, 2025; 4:00 p.m., ESPN+		at North Texas	L 78–84	7–7 (1–1)	22 – tied	12 – Periman	5 – Periman	The Super Pit (1,579); Denton, TX
January 4, 2025; 2:00 p.m., ESPN+		UTSA	L 53–60	7–8 (1–2)	15 – Hill	8 – Crawford	3 – tied	Reynolds Center (1,317); Tulsa, OK
January 8, 2025; 6:30 p.m., ESPN+		Charlotte	W 76–70	8–8 (2–2)	21 – Cartwright	15 – Periman	8 – Periman	Reynolds Center (1,122); Tulsa, OK
January 11, 2025; 1:00 p.m., ESPN+		at Temple	L 71–73	8–9 (2–3)	21 – Crawford	4 – tied	6 – Crawford	Liacouras Center (1,243); Philadelphia, PA
January 15, 2025; 6:30 p.m., ESPN+		Florida Atlantic	W 79–64	9–9 (3–3)	16 – Hill	17 – Periman	5 – Cartwright	Reynolds Center (1,044); Tulsa, OK
January 22, 2025; 6:30 p.m., ESPN+		at UTSA	L 53–64	9–10 (3–4)	17 – Crawford	9 – Periman	3 – Hill	Convocation Center (1,345); San Antonio, TX
January 25, 2025; 2:00 p.m., ESPN+		Memphis	W 64–57	10–10 (4–4)	16 – Cartwright	8 – tied	5 – Periman	Reynolds Center (1,344); Tulsa, OK
January 29, 2025; 7:00 p.m., ESPN+		at Rice	L 45–64	10–11 (4–5)	14 – Ayson	7 – Periman	1 – tied	Tudor Fieldhouse (694); Houston, TX
February 1, 2025; 2:00 p.m., ESPN+		Wichita State	W 56–42	11–11 (5–5)	20 – Hill	10 – Periman	6 – Crawford	Reynolds Center (1,387); Tulsa, OK
February 5, 2025; 5:30 p.m., ESPN+		at Charlotte	W 81–53	12–11 (6–5)	23 – Crawford	11 – Periman	4 – tied	Dale F. Halton Arena (595); Charlotte, NC
February 8, 2025; 1:00 p.m., ESPN+		at East Carolina	L 64–73	12–12 (6–6)	24 – Crawford	6 – tied	4 – Ayson	Williams Arena (1,643); Greenville, NC
February 15, 2025; 2:00 p.m., ESPN+		North Texas	L 58–61	12–13 (6–7)	19 – Crawford	9 – Periman	4 – Crawford	Reynolds Center (1,402); Tulsa, OK
February 19, 2025; 6:30 p.m., ESPN+		Tulane	W 73–54	13–13 (7–7)	23 – Cartwright	9 – Periman	4 – Crawford	Reynolds Center (1,136); Tulsa, OK
February 22, 2025; 2:00 p.m., ESPN+		at UAB	W 72–68 ^{OT}	14–13 (8–7)	22 – Crawford	14 – Periman	3 – Cartwright	Bartow Arena (302); Birmingham, AL
February 26, 2025; 6:30 p.m., ESPN+		South Florida	W 66–58	15–13 (9–7)	18 – Cartwright	7 – tied	5 – Crawford	Reynolds Center (1,588); Tulsa, OK
March 1, 2025; 2:00 p.m., ESPN+		at Memphis	W 81–79	16–13 (10–7)	22 – Crawford	6 – Periman	9 – Periman	Elma Roane Fieldhouse (1,811); Memphis, TN
March 4, 2025; 6:00 p.m., ESPN+		at Wichita State	W 58–46	17–13 (11–7)	16 – Crawford	13 – Periman	4 – Crawford	Charles Koch Arena (1,109); Wichita, KS
AAC tournament
March 10, 2025; 1:30 pm, ESPN+	(5)	vs. (12) Charlotte; Second Round	L 66–71	17–14	18 – Crawford	14 – Periman	3 – tied	Dickies Arena (2,446); Fort Worth, TX
WNIT
March 20, 2025*; 7:00 p.m., ESPN+		at Lindenwood; First Round	L 60–76	17–15	13 – tied	9 – Periman	4 – Ayson	Robert F. Hyland Performance Arena (506); St. Charles, MO
*Non-conference game. ^{#}Rankings from AP poll. (#) Tournament seedings in parentheses. All times are in Central.
