= 2024–25 Temple Owls women's basketball team =

American college basketball season

2024–25 Temple Owls women's basketball
- Conference: American Athletic Conference
- Record: 19–10 (13–5 AAC)
- Head coach: Diane Richardson (3rd season)
- Associate head coach: Wanisha Smith
- Assistant coaches: Cheyenne Curley; Myles Jackson; Shenita Landry; Aaron Thomas
- Home arena: Liacouras Center

2024–25 American Athletic Conference women's basketball standings
	Conf.				Overall
Team	W		L	PCT	W		L	PCT
UTSA	17	–	1	.944	26	–	5	.839
North Texas	15	–	3	.833	25	–	9	.735
South Florida †	13	–	4	.765	23	–	11	.676
Temple	13	–	5	.722	20	–	11	.645
Tulsa	11	–	7	.611	17	–	15	.531
Tulane	9	–	8	.529	17	–	13	.567
East Carolina	8	–	10	.444	17	–	15	.531
UAB	7	–	11	.389	16	–	16	.500
Rice	7	–	11	.389	17	–	17	.500
Memphis	5	–	13	.278	7	–	23	.233
Wichita State	4	–	14	.222	10	–	22	.313
Charlotte	4	–	14	.222	11	–	21	.344
Florida Atlantic	3	–	15	.167	11	–	21	.344
† 2025 AAC tournament winner

The 2024–25 Temple Owls women's basketball team represented Temple University during the 2024–25 NCAA Division I women's basketball season. The Owls, led by third-year head coach Diane Richardson, played their home games at the Liacouras Center in Philadelphia, Pennsylvania as members of the American Athletic Conference.

== Previous season ==
The Owls finished the 2023–24 season 20–12, 13–5 in AAC play to finish in a tie a three-way tie for first place. They defeated Tulane in the quarterfinals, before being upset by eventual tournament champions Rice in the semifinals of the AAC tournament.

== Roster ==
2024–25 Temple Owls women's basketball team
Players
Coaches

Pos.	#	Name	Height	Year	Previous school	Hometown
G	0	Adena Webster	5 ft 8 in (1.73 m)	Fr	Archbishop Coleman Carroll HS	Nassau, Bahamas
F	1	Amaya Oliver	6 ft 1 in (1.85 m)	GS	Loyola Marymount	Richmond, California
G	3	Makayla Waleed	5 ft 8 in (1.73 m)	Sr	Emerge Academy	Upper Marlboro, Maryland
G	5	Kelian Cedano	5 ft 9 in (1.75 m)	Fr	Putnam Science Academy	Boston, Massachusetts
G	7	Kaylah Turner	5 ft 6 in (1.68 m)	So	Alabama A&M	Jacksonville, Florida
F	8	Jaleesa Molina	6 ft 2 in (1.88 m)	So	Landslake Lions	The Hague, Netherlands
F	9	Felicia Jacobs	6 ft 2 in (1.88 m)	Fr	City of London Academy, Southwark	London, England
G	10	Savannah Curry	5 ft 11 in (1.8 m)	Fr	Westtown School	Fallston, Maryland
G	11	Tristen Taylor	5 ft 5 in (1.65 m)	So	Duncanville HS	Dallas, Texas
F/C	13	Alexandra Wilkinson	6 ft 2 in (1.88 m)	RS Jr	CCBC Essex	Woodbury, New Jersey
F	19	Anissa Rivera	6 ft 1 in (1.85 m)	GS	Towson	Capitol Heights, Maryland
G	22	Tarriyonna Gary (5Y)	5 ft 8 in (1.73 m)	Sr	Towson	Brooksville, Florida
G	30	Drew Alexander	5 ft 11 in (1.8 m)	RS Fr	Shabach Christian Academy	Greensboro, North Carolina
C	34	Sheyenne Swain-Price	6 ft 0 in (1.83 m)	RS Fr	Dexter Southfield School	Stoughton, Massachusetts
G	55	Tiarra East	5 ft 10 in (1.78 m)	Sr	Butler Traditional HS	Louisville, Kentucky

Head coach

- Diane Richardson (Frostburg State)

Assistant coach(es)

- Wanisha Smith (Duke)
- Cheyenne Curley (Howard)
- Myles Jackson (Towson)
- Shenita Landry (Temple)
- Aaron Thomas (Towson)

Legend

- (C) Team captain
- (S) Suspended
- (I) Ineligible
- (W) Walk-on
- (5Y) Fifth-year senior
- Injured
- Current redshirt

Roster
Last update: December 23, 2024

== Schedule and results ==
Date time, TV	Rank^{#}	Opponent^{#}	Result	Record	High points	High rebounds	High assists	Site (attendance) city, state
Non-conference regular season
November 4, 2024*; 8:00 pm, ESPN+		Richmond	L 72–79	0–1	23 – East	8 – Oliver	5 – Taylor	Liacouras Center (3,485); Philadelphia, PA
November 12, 2024*; 6:30 pm, FloHoops		at Delaware	W 67–56	1–1	17 – Gary	8 – Oliver	8 – Taylor	Bob Carpenter Center (1,199); Newark, DE
November 15, 2024*; 7:00 pm, ESPN+		at VCU	W 59–55	2–1	28 – East	16 – Rivera	3 – Taylor	Siegel Center (6,093); Richmond, VA
November 19, 2024*; 7:00 pm, FloHoops		at Georgetown	L 51–65	2–2	16 – Rivera	12 – Rivera	5 – Taylor	McDonough Arena (743); Washington, D.C.
November 23, 2024*; 2:00 pm, ESPN+		Drexel; Big 5 Classic Pod 1	W 52–43	3–2	15 – East	7 – Oliver	5 – East	Liacouras Center (1,453); Philadelphia, PA
November 26, 2024*; 5:00 pm, ESPN+		Princeton	L 57–62	3–3	15 – Turner	7 – Rivera	6 – Taylor	Liacouras Center (1,063); Philadelphia, PA
December 1, 2024*; 2:00 pm, ESPN+		at La Salle; Big 5 Classic Pod 1	W 73–68	4–3	17 – Turner	6 – East	7 – East	John Glaser Arena (192); Philadelphia, PA
December 6, 2024*; 8:00 pm, NBCSPHI+		at Villanova; Big 5 Classic championship	W 76–62	5–3	26 – East	7 – Rivera	3 – Tied	Finneran Pavilion (1,526); Villanova, PA
December 15, 2024*; 2:00 pm, ESPN2/ESPN+		No. 15 West Virginia	L 46–68	5–4	15 – East	7 – Tied	2 – Tied	Liacouras Center (1,672); Philadelphia, PA
December 21, 2024*; 10:00 pm		vs. Xavier; Raising the B.A.R. Invitational semifinal	W 66–51	6–4	20 – East	14 – Oliver	3 – Gary	Haas Pavilion (1,856); Berkeley, CA
December 22, 2024*; 8:00 pm, ACCNX		at No. 24 California; Raising the B.A.R. Invitational championship	L 63–89	6–5	17 – Taylor	7 – Rivera	4 – East	Haas Pavilion (1,912); Berkeley, CA
AAC regular season
December 29, 2024; 3:00 pm, ESPN+		at UAB	W 97–74	7–5 (1–0)	21 – East	10 – Molina	5 – East	Bartow Arena (305); Birmingham, AL
January 1, 2025; 4:00 pm, ESPN+		East Carolina	W 63-58	8-5 (2-0)	26 – Gary	10 – Molina	4 – Tied	Liacouras Center (432); Philadelphia, PA
January 4, 2025; 7:00 pm, ESPN+		at South Florida	L 56-65	8-6 (2-1)	19 – Rivera	5 – Tied	5 – Gary	Yuengling Center (2,370); Tampa, FL
January 8, 2025; 7:00 pm, ESPN+		at Florida Atlantic	W 75-69 ^{OT}	9-6 (3-1)	25 – Turner	10 – Molina	4 – Tied	Eleanor R. Baldwin Arena (461); Boca Raton, FL
January 11, 2025; 2:00 pm, ESPN+		Tulsa	W 73-71	10-6 (4-1)	21 – Gary	10 – Molina	7 – Taylor	Liacouras Center (1,243); Philadelphia, PA
January 18, 2025; 2:00 pm, ESPN+		Charlotte	W 80-62	11-6 (5-1)	18 – Gary	11 – Molina	5 – Gary	Liacouras Center (1,490); Philadelphia, PA
January 22, 2025; 6:00 pm, ESPN+		at East Carolina	W 69-52	12-6 (6-1)	19 – East	8 – Molina	6 – Taylor	Williams Arena (861); Greenville, NC
January 25, 2025; 2:00 pm, ESPN+		Tulane	L 60-62	12-7 (6-2)	23 – Gary	8 – Gary	3 – Taylor	Liacouras Center (1,435); Philadelphia, PA
January 29, 2025; 7:30 pm, ESPN+		at North Texas	L 67-70	12-8 (6-3)	16 – Rivera	9 – Molina	3 – Turner	The Super Pit (1,950); Denton, TX
February 1, 2025; 3:00 pm, ESPN+		at UTSA	L 61-70	12-9 (6-4)	18 – East	8 – Molina	4 – Taylor	Convocation Center (1,412); San Antonio, TX
February 5, 2025; 11:00 am, ESPN+		Memphis	W 74-66	13-9 (7-4)	12 – Tied	8 – Molina	4 – Taylor	Liacouras Center (3,496); Philadelphia, PA
February 8, 2025; 2:00 pm, ESPN+		South Florida	L 57-64	13-10 (7-5)	15 – East	5 – Tied	8 – Taylor	Liacouras Center (1,505); Philadelphia, PA
February 11, 2025; 6:00 pm, ESPN+		UAB	W 63-53	14-10 (8-5)	17 – Molina	11 – Molina	3 – Tied	Liacouras Center (1,319); Philadelphia, PA
February 15, 2025; 4:00 pm, ESPN+		at Tulane	W 73-56	15-10 (9-5)	22 – Turner	15 – Molina	4 – Turner	Devlin Fieldhouse (727); New Orleans, LA
February 19, 2025; 7:00 pm, ESPN+		Wichita State	W 70-51	16-10 (10-5)	25 – Gary	12 – Molina	4 – Taylor	Liacouras Center (1,392); Philadelphia, PA
February 25, 2025; 8:00 pm, ESPN+		at Memphis	W 91-79	17-10 (11-5)	21 – Tied	6 – Gary	3 – Tied	Elma Roane Fieldhouse (948); Memphis, TN
February 28, 2025; 7:00 pm, ESPN+		Rice	W 83-63	18-10 (12-5)	33 – East	8 – Tied	4 – Gary	Liacouras Center (1,402); Philadelphia, PA
March 4, 2025; 6:30 pm, ESPN+		at Charlotte	W 60-54	19-10 (13-5)	18 – East	9 – Rivera	3 – Gary	Dale F. Halton Arena (557); Charlotte, NC
AAC tournament
March 10, 2025; 3:00 pm, ESPN+	(4)	vs. (12) Charlotte; Quarterfinals	W 65–34	20–10	12 – Oliver	13 – Oliver	6 – East	Dickies Arena (1,961); Fort Worth, TX
March 11, 2025; 7:00 pm, ESPN+	(4)	vs. (9) Rice; Semifinals	L 49–67	20–11	11 – Molina	10 – Tied	2 – Tied	Dickies Arena; Fort Worth, TX
*Non-conference game. ^{#}Rankings from AP Poll. (#) Tournament seedings in parentheses. All times are in Eastern.
