= 2024–25 Southeastern Louisiana Lady Lions basketball team =

Intercollegiate basketball season

2024–25 Southeastern Louisiana Lady Lions basketball

Southland Conference regular season champions

WBIT, First Round
- Conference: Southland Conference
- Record: 26–6 (19–1 Southland)
- Head coach: Ayla Guzzardo (8th season)
- Assistant coaches: Kenneth Lee, Jr.; Ronneka Robertson; Aja Ochie
- Home arena: Pride Roofing University Center

2024–25 Southland Conference women's basketball standings
	Conf.				Overall
Team	W		L	PCT	W		L	PCT
Southeastern Louisiana	19	–	1	.950	26	–	6	.813
Lamar	17	–	3	.850	22	–	8	.733
Stephen F. Austin †	16	–	4	.800	29	–	6	.829
Incarnate Word	12	–	8	.600	18	–	14	.563
Northwestern State	12	–	8	.600	16	–	16	.500
UT Rio Grande Valley	11	–	9	.550	16	–	16	.500
Nicholls	9	–	11	.450	17	–	14	.548
Texas A&M–Corpus Christi	7	–	13	.350	15	–	17	.469
New Orleans	5	–	15	.250	5	–	24	.172
McNeese	5	–	15	.250	10	–	21	.323
East Texas A&M*	4	–	16	.200	7	–	22	.241
Houston Christian	3	–	17	.150	6	–	23	.207
† 2025 Southland tournament winner * ineligible for the 2025 NCAA tournament due to transition from Division II

The 2024–25 Southeastern Louisiana Lady Lions basketball team represented Southeastern Louisiana University in the 2024–25 NCAA Division I women's basketball season. The Lady Lions were led by eighth-year head coach Ayla Guzzardo, and played their home games at Pride Roofing University Center as members of the Southland Conference.

On March 22, head coach Ayla Guzzardo announced that she would leave the program, as she had been hired as head coach for conference opponent McNeese.

On March 25, Southeastern Louisiana hired Incarnate Word head coach Jeff Dow as their new coach.

== Previous season ==
The Lady Lions finished the 2023–24 season 19–12 overall, 14–4 in Southland play to finish in a tie for second place. With a first-round bye, they defeated Nicholls in the second round of the Southland women's tournament. Their season ended when they were defeated by Texas A&M–Corpus Christi in the semi-finals.

== Media ==
Home games are broadcast on ESPN+.

== Preseason polls ==
=== Southland Conference Poll ===
The Southland Conference released its preseason poll on October 17, 2024. Receiving 213 overall votes and five first-place votes, the Lady Lions were picked to finish second in the conference.

Predicted finish	Team	Votes (1st place)
1	Lamar	236 (19)
2	Southeastern Louisiana	213 (5)
3	Texas A&M–Corpus Christi	200
4	Stephen F. Austin	193
5	Incarnate Word	149
6	Texas A&M–Commerce (renamed)	112
7	Nicholls	108
8	New Orleans	109
9	UT Rio Grande Valley	92
10	Northwestern State	67
11	McNeese	61
12	Houston Christian	51

=== Preseason All Conference ===
Junior forward Lexi Alexander was selected to the Preseason All-Conference first team. Senior and junior guards Taylor Bell and Jalencia Pierre were selected to the second team.

== Roster ==
2024–25 Southeastern Louisiana Lions women's basketball team
Players
Coaches

Pos.	#	Name	Height	Year	Previous school	Hometown
F	0	Lexi Alexander	6 ft 0 in (1.83 m)	Jr	Cedar Ridge HS; Nicholls	Round Rock, TX
G	1	Jalencia Pierre	5 ft 5 in (1.65 m)	Jr	Amite HS	Springfield, LA
G	2	Arianna Patton	5 ft 5 in (1.65 m)	Sr	Meridian HS; Jones College	Meridian, MS
G	3	Allasia Washington	5 ft 8 in (1.73 m)	Jr	Madison Prep Academy	Baton Rouge, LA
G	4	Demi Gentry	5 ft 11 in (1.8 m)	So	White Station HS	Memphis, TN
G	5	Taylor Bell	5 ft 11 in (1.8 m)	Sr	Huntington HS	Shreveport, LA
G	6	Kaili Chamberlain	5 ft 9 in (1.75 m)	Sr	South Medford; McNeese; Austin Peay	Medford, OR
G	7	Tyreona Sibley	5 ft 8 in (1.73 m)	Fr	Central HS	Baton Rouge, LA
G	10	Jaslynn Walter	5 ft 10 in (1.78 m)	Fr	East Nashville Magnet HS	Nashville, TN
G	11	Avari Berry	5 ft 6 in (1.68 m)	So	Pflugerville HS	Austin, TX
F	12	Terri Crawford	6 ft 1 in (1.85 m)	Sr	Ramsay HS; Central Arkansas	Birmingham, AL
F	13	Mo'Nique Joseph	6 ft 1 in (1.85 m)	Jr	King's Academy; Indian River CC	Lake Worth, FL
G	24	Mackenzie Thomas	5 ft 8 in (1.73 m)	Sr	Laurel HS; Jones College	Laurel, MS
F	30	Cheyanne Daniels	6 ft 3 in (1.91 m)	Sr	Miami Senior HS; Shawnee CC	Miami, FL
G	31	Alexius Horne	5 ft 9 in (1.75 m)	GS	Denham Springs HS	Baton Rouge, LA

Head coach

- Ayla Guzzardo (Akron)

Assistant coach(es)

- Kenneth Lee, Jr. (Nicholls State)
- Aja Ochie (Southeastern Louisiana)
- Ronneka Robertson (South Alabama)

Legend

- (C) Team captain
- (S) Suspended
- (I) Ineligible
- (W) Walk-on
- Injured
- Current redshirt

Roster
Last update: October 7, 2024

== Schedule and results ==
Date time, TV	Rank^{#}	Opponent^{#}	Result	Record	High points	High rebounds	High assists	Site (attendance) city, state
Exhibition
Nov 1, 2024*; 6:00 pm		Louisiana Christian	W 87–38	–	14 – T. Sibley	10 – tied (2)	5 – J. Pierre	Pride Roofing University Center (375); Hammond, Louisiana
Non-conference regular season
Nov 4, 2024*; 5:30 pm, ESPN+		Millsaps	W 79–45	1–0	15 – T. Bell	9 – tied (2)	5 – J. Pierre	Pride Roofing University Center (886); Hammond, Louisiana
Nov 9, 2024*; 1:00 pm, BTN+		at No. 23 Nebraska	L 68–78	1–1	24 – A. Horne	7 – tied (2)	5 – A. Horne	Pinnacle Bank Arena (5,006); Lincoln, Nebraska
Nov 15, 2024*; 6:00 pm, ESPN+		Southern Miss	W 68–61	2–1	13 – A. Horne	12 – L. Alexander	2 – tied (5)	Pride Roofing University Center (1,338); Hammond, Louisiana
Nov 19, 2024*; 7:00 pm, ESPN+		at Memphis	W 63–57	3–1	18 – A. Horne	7 – L. Alexander	2 – tied (2)	Elma Roane Fieldhouse (915); Memphis, TN
Nov 24, 2024*; 3:00 pm, ESPN+		at Louisiana Tech	W 59–47	4–1	16 – T. Bell	6 – J. Pierre	5 – A. Horne	Thomas Assembly Center (1,050); Ruston, LA
Nov 29, 2024*; 5:00 pm		vs. Quinnipiac; Miami Thanksgiving Event	L 53–70	4–2	17 – L. Alexander	12 – C. Daniels	5 – J. Pierre	Watsco Center (350); Coral Gables, FL
Dec 1, 2024*; 12:00 pm or 2:30 pm, ACCNX		vs. Charlotte; Miami Thanksgiving Event	W 62–53	5–2	15 – T. Bell	6 – T. Bell	6 – J. Pierre	Watsco Center (107); Coral Gables, FL
Dec 5, 2024*; 11:00 am, ESPN+		Spring Hill	W 73–26	6–2	12 – T. Sibley	7 – M. Thomas	6 – A. Berry	Pride Roofing University Center (3,296); Hammond, Louisiana
Dec 8, 2024*; 1:00 pm, ESPN+		at Houston	L 65–70	6–3	18 – L. Alexander	7 – L. Alexander	7 – J. Pierre	Fertitta Center (846); Houston, TX
Southland Conference regular season
Dec 18, 2024; 6:30 pm, ESPN+		at Nicholls	W 58–54	7–3 (1–0)	18 – J. Pierre	6 – A. Horne	6 – A. Horne	Stopher Gymnasium (350); Thibodaux, LA
Dec 21, 2024; 1:00 pm, ESPN+		at McNeese	W 82–56	8–3 (2–0)	19 – A. Horne	7 – L. Alexander	4 – J. Pierre	The Legacy Center (2,437); Lake Charles, LA
Jan 2, 2025; 6:00 pm, ESPN+		UT Rio Grande Valley	W 80–41	9–3 (3–0)	18 – A. Washington	8 – J. Pierre	4 – T. Sibley	Pride Roofing University Center (541); Hammond, Louisiana
Jan 4, 2025; 1:00 pm, ESPN+		Texas A&M–Corpus Christi	W 75–62	10–3 (4–0)	23 – A. Horne	7 – T. Bell	6 – A. Horne	Pride Roofing University Center (623); Hammond, Louisiana
Jan 9, 2025; 6:30 pm, ESPN+		at Stephen F. Austin	W 87–81	11–3 (5–0)	20 – C. Daniels	9 – C. Daniels	8 – j. Pierre	William R. Johnson Coliseum (853); Nacogdoches, TX
Jan 11, 2025; 2:00 pm, ESPN+		at New Orleans	W 83–53	12–3 (6–0)	19 – A. Horne	9 – T. Sibley	9 – J. Pierre	Lakefront Arena (349); New Orleans, LA
Jan 16, 2025; 6:30 pm, ESPN+		at East Texas A&M	W 57–44	13–3 (7–0)	10 – T. Bell	6 – L. Alexander	4 – A. Horne	The Field House (637); Commerce, TX
Jan 18, 2025; 1:00 pm, ESPN+		at Northwestern State	W 66–57	14–3 (8–0)	19 – A. Washington	5 – C. Daniels	4 – A. Berry	Prather Coliseum (374); Natchitoches, LA
Jan 25, 2025; 1:00 pm, ESPN+		Incarnate Word	W 66–42	15–3 (9–0)	13 – L. Alexander	9 – L. Alexander	3 – J. Pierre	Pride Roofing University Center (619); Hammond, Louisiana
Jan 27, 2025; 5:30 pm, ESPN+		Houston Christian	W 65–41	16–3 (10–0)	17 – A. Horne	15 – C. Daniels	5 – J. Pierre	Pride Roofing University Center (444); Hammond, Louisiana
Jan 30, 2025; 6:00 pm, ESPN+		Lamar	W 60–48	17–3 (11–0)	11 – J. Pierre	8 – L. Alexander	6 – J. Pierre	Pride Roofing University Center (1,669); Hammond, Louisiana
Feb 1, 2025; 1:00 pm, ESPN+		New Orleans	W 59–50	18–3 (12–0)	19 – A. Horne	6 – A. Horne	5 – J. Pierre	Pride Roofing University Center (708); Hammond, Louisiana
Feb 6, 2025; 6:00 pm, ESPN+		at Houston Christian	W 58–31	19–3 (13–0)	14 – C. Daniels	10 – C. Daniels	3 – A. Horne	Sharp Gymnasium (389); Houston, TX
Feb 8, 2025; 1:00 pm, ESPN+		at Incarnate Word	W 62–43	20–3 (14–0)	12 – C. Daniels	7 – C. Daniels	6 – J. Pierre	McDermott Center (136); San Antonio, TX
Feb 13, 2025; 6:00 pm, ESPN+		McNeese	W 65–45	21–3 (15–0)	15 – A. Horne	12 – T. Sibley	6 – J. Pierre6	Pride Roofing University Center (1,010); Hammond, Louisiana
Feb 15, 2025; 1:00 pm, ESPN+		Nicholls	W 63–50	22–3 (16–0)	10 – J. Pierre	9 – L. Alexander	3 – L. Alexander	Pride Roofing University Center (858); Hammond, Louisiana
Feb 20, 2025; 6:00 pm, ESPN+		Northwestern State	W 65–58	23–3 (17–0)	23 – A. Horne	7 – J. Pierre	5 – J. Pierre	Pride Roofing University Center (582); Hammond, Louisiana
Feb 22, 2025; 1:00 pm, ESPN+		East Texas A&M	W 75–55	24–3 (18–0)	15 – A. Washington	7 – T. Sibley	3 – T. Bell	Pride Roofing University Center (888); Hammond, Louisiana
Feb 27, 2025; 12:00 pm, ESPN+		at UT Rio Grande Valley	W 52–48	25–3 (19–0)	19 – A. Horne	8 – L. Alexander	3 – J. Pierre	UTRGV Fieldhouse (2,478); Edinburg, TX
Mar 1, 2025; 2:00 pm, ESPN+		at Texas A&M–Corpus Christi	L 52–54	25–4 (19–1)	16 – Horne	6 – Daniels	4 – Horne	American Bank Center (1,936); Corpus Christi, TX
2025 Jersey Mike's Subs Southland Conference Tournament (1–1)
Mar 12, 2025; 10:30 am, ESPN+	(1)	vs. (4) Incarnate Word; Semifinals	W 57–37	26–4 (1–0)	12 – L. Alexander	10 – L. Alexander	3 – Tied	The Legacy Center; Lake Charles, LA
Mar 13, 2025; 1:00 pm, ESPNU	(1)	vs. (3) Stephen F. Austin; Championship	L 57–65	26–5 (1–1)	13 – Tied	10 – L. Alexander	3 – J. Pierre	The Legacy Center (1,311); Lake Charles, LA
WBIT
Mar 20, 2025*; 8:00 pm, ESPN+		at (1) Colorado; First round	L 41–73	26–6	14 – Horne	5 – Bell	3 – Horne	CU Events Center (1,469); Boulder, CO
*Non-conference game. ^{#}Rankings from AP Poll. (#) Tournament seedings in parentheses. All times are in Central Time.

== Conference awards and honors ==
=== Weekly awards ===
Weekly honors
Honors	Player	Position	Date awarded	Ref.

== See also ==
- 2024–25 Southeastern Louisiana Lions basketball team
