= 2024–25 Memphis Tigers women's basketball team =

American college basketball season

2024–25 Memphis Tigers women's basketball
- Conference: American Athletic Conference
- Record: 7–23 (5–13 AAC)
- Head coach: Alex Simmons (2nd season)
- Assistant coaches: Harlyn Wyatt; Josh Cooperwood; Whitney Bays; Nadiria Evans; Keondra McKinney
- Home arena: Elma Roane Fieldhouse

2024–25 American Athletic Conference women's basketball standings
	Conf.				Overall
Team	W		L	PCT	W		L	PCT
UTSA	17	–	1	.944	26	–	5	.839
North Texas	15	–	3	.833	25	–	9	.735
South Florida †	13	–	4	.765	23	–	11	.676
Temple	13	–	5	.722	20	–	11	.645
Tulsa	11	–	7	.611	17	–	15	.531
Tulane	9	–	8	.529	17	–	13	.567
East Carolina	8	–	10	.444	17	–	15	.531
UAB	7	–	11	.389	16	–	16	.500
Rice	7	–	11	.389	17	–	17	.500
Memphis	5	–	13	.278	7	–	23	.233
Wichita State	4	–	14	.222	10	–	22	.313
Charlotte	4	–	14	.222	11	–	21	.344
Florida Atlantic	3	–	15	.167	11	–	21	.344
† 2025 AAC tournament winner

The 2024–25 Memphis Tigers women's basketball team represented the University of Memphis during the 2024–25 NCAA Division I women's basketball season. The Tigers, led by second-year head coach Alex Simmons, played their home games at the Elma Roane Fieldhouse in Memphis, Tennessee, as members of the American Athletic Conference.

== Previous season ==
The Tigers finished the 2023–24 season 13–17, 9–9 in AAC play to finish in a five-way tie for sixth place. They were defeated by East Carolina in the second round of the AAC tournament.

== Roster ==
2024–25 Memphis Tigers women's basketball team
Players
Coaches

Pos.	#	Name	Height	Year	Previous school	Hometown
G	0	Destyne Jackson	5 ft 7 in (1.7 m)	GS	Wright State	Lexington, Kentucky
G	1	Tilly Boler (5Y)	6 ft 1 in (1.85 m)	Sr	Jackson State	Meridian, Mississippi
G	2	Taylor Barner	5 ft 9 in (1.75 m)	Fr	Panther Creek High School	Cary, North Carolina
G	3	Elauna Eaton	6 ft 0 in (1.83 m)	RS Jr	Ole Miss	Helena, Arkansas
G	5	Ally Hollifield	5 ft 7 in (1.7 m)	So	Shelby High School	Shelby, North Carolina
G	6	DeeDee Hagemann	5 ft 7 in (1.7 m)	Sr	Michigan State	Detroit, Michigan
F	7	Hannah Riddick	6 ft 1 in (1.85 m)	Sr	Cairine Wilson Secondary School	Calgary, Alberta
F	10	Bailey Gilmore	6 ft 3 in (1.91 m)	RS Fr	Vanderbilt	Midway, Georgia
G	11	Tanyuel Welch	5 ft 10 in (1.78 m)	RS So	North Central High School	Indianapolis, Indiana
F	21	Latazia Williamson	6 ft 1 in (1.85 m)	So	Hillsboro High School	Nashville, Tennessee
F	22	Layken Cox	6 ft 1 in (1.85 m)	Sr	Gardner–Webb	Sumter, South Carolina
G	23	Raven Sims	5 ft 9 in (1.75 m)	So	Bartlett High School	Memphis, Tennessee
F	24	Tamya Smith	6 ft 2 in (1.88 m)	Fr	Pleasant Grove High School	Pleasant Grove, Alabama
F	30	Alasia Smith (5Y)	5 ft 10 in (1.78 m)	Sr	Gardner–Webb	Johnson City, Tennessee
F	34	Quinzia Fulmore	6 ft 3 in (1.91 m)	Sr	Towson	Greensboro, North Carolina

Head coach

- Alex Simmons (Tennessee)

Assistant coach(es)

- Harlyn Wyatt (Tulane)
- Josh Cooperwood (Tennessee State)
- Whitney Bays (Purdue)
- Nadiria Evans (UNC Asheville)
- Keondra McKinney (Charlotte)

Legend

- (C) Team captain
- (S) Suspended
- (I) Ineligible
- (W) Walk-on
- (5Y) Fifth-year senior
- Injured
- Current redshirt

Roster
Last update: December 28, 2024

== Schedule and results ==
Date time, TV	Rank^{#}	Opponent^{#}	Result	Record	High points	High rebounds	High assists	Site (attendance) city, state
Exhibition
October 15, 2024*; 8:30 pm, ESPN+		No. 1 South Carolina; Hoops for St. Jude Tip Off Classic	L 63–106	–	16 – Boler	6 – Fulmore	4 – Welch	FedExForum (8,748); Memphis, TN
Non-conference regular season
November 4, 2024*; 11:00 am, ESPN+		Mississippi Valley State	W 89–78	1–0	26 – Riddick	17 – Riddick	5 – Welch	Elma Roane Fieldhouse (1,247); Memphis, TN
November 7, 2024*; 6:30 pm, SECN+		at Mississippi State	L 56–100	1–1	23 – Boler	8 – Fulmore	4 – Sims	Humphrey Coliseum (4,971); Starkville, MS
November 10, 2024*; 2:00 pm, ESPN+		Samford	W 88–75	2–1	28 – A. Smith	9 – Riddick	4 – Welch	Elma Roane Fieldhouse (802); Memphis, TN
November 13, 2024*; 5:30 pm, ESPN+		at Ball State	L 66–95	2–2	18 – Eaton	9 – Welch	7 – Welch	Worthen Arena (1,809); Muncie, IN
November 19, 2024*; 7:00 pm, ESPN+		Southeastern Louisiana	L 57–63	2–3	23 – Boler	15 – A. Smith	3 – Tied	Elma Roane Fieldhouse (915); Memphis, TN
November 23, 2024*; 2:00 pm, ESPN+		Murray State	L 83–87	2–4	20 – Boler	12 – A. Smith	6 – A. Smith	Elma Roane Fieldhouse (1,113); Memphis, TN
December 1, 2024*; 1:00 pm, ESPN+		at East Tennessee State	L 71–78	2–5	20 – Eaton	9 – A. Smith	3 – Eaton	Brooks Gymnasium (812); Johnson City, TN
December 8, 2024*; 2:00 pm, ESPN+		at Southern Miss	L 69–82	2–6	22 – Boler	9 – A. Smith	2 – Tied	Reed Green Coliseum (1,258); Hattiesburg, MS
December 14, 2024*; 2:00 pm, ESPN+		at Troy	L 67–85	2–7	21 – Welch	8 – A. Smith	3 – Tied	Trojan Arena (2,245); Troy, AL
December 18, 2024*; 7:30 pm, ESPNews		No. 18 Tennessee	L 75–90	2–8	23 – Boler	8 – Tied	4 – Hagemann	FedExForum (3,019); Memphis, TN
December 21, 2024*; 4:00 pm, ESPNU		Louisville; Rivalry	L 68–87	2–9	20 – Boler	6 – A. Smith	8 – Hagemann	FedExForum (2,021); Memphis, TN
AAC regular season
January 1, 2025; 3:00 pm, ESPN+		Wichita State	W 93-83	3–9 (1–0)	25 – Boler	10 – A. Smith	1 – Hagemann	Elma Roane Fieldhouse (1,064); Memphis, TN
January 4, 2025; 2:00 pm, ESPN+		North Texas	L 71–73	3–10 (1–1)	19 – Boler	12 – A. Smith	3 – Tied	Elma Roane Fieldhouse (1,209); Memphis, TN
January 8, 2025; 6:00 pm, ESPN+		at UAB	L 56–73	3–11 (1–2)	13 – Tied	17 – A. Smith	7 – Hagemann	Bartow Arena (270); Birmingham, AL
January 12, 2025; 2:00 pm, ESPN+		at Rice	L 59–70	3–12 (1–3)	16 – Welch	8 – A. Smith	5 – Welch	Tudor Fieldhouse (745); Houston, TX
January 15, 2025; 7:00 pm, ESPN+		UTSA	L 68–70	3–13 (1–4)	19 – Boler	13 – A. Smith	6 – Hagemann	Elma Roane Fieldhouse (884); Memphis, TN
January 18, 2025; 2:00 pm, ESPN+		at Tulane	W 68–65	4–13 (2–4)	20 – Hagemann	11 – A. Smith	7 – Hagemann	Devlin Fieldhouse (801); New Orleans, LA
January 25, 2025; 2:00 pm, ESPN+		at Tulsa	L 57–64	4–14 (2–5)	19 – Boler	13 – A. Smith	3 – Hagemann	Reynolds Center (1,344); Tulsa, OK
January 29, 2025; 7:00 pm, ESPN+		Charlotte	L 59–67	4–15 (2–6)	19 – Boler	14 – A. Smith	2 – Hagemann	Elma Roane Fieldhouse (1,083); Memphis, TN
February 1, 2025; 2:00 pm, ESPN+		East Carolina	W 75–69	5–15 (3–6)	21 – Welch	10 – A. Smith	5 – Hagemann	Elma Roane Fieldhouse (981); Memphis, TN
February 5, 2025; 10:00 am, ESPN+		at Temple	L 66–74	5–16 (3–7)	27 – Boler	10 – A. Smith	8 – Hagemann	Liacouras Center (3,496); Philadelphia, PA
February 8, 2025; 2:00 pm, ESPN+		Florida Atlantic	W 73–60	6–16 (4–7)	15 – Martino	9 – T. Smith	9 – Hagemann	Elma Roane Fieldhouse (1,412); Memphis, TN
February 12, 2025; 6:30 pm, ESPN+		at North Texas	L 57–97	6–17 (4–8)	14 – Boler	4 – Tied	7 – Hagemann	The Super Pit (1,852); Denton, TX
February 15, 2025; 2:00 pm, ESPN+		at UTSA	L 61–80	6–18 (4–9)	16 – Welch	9 – Welch	5 – Welch	Convocation Center (1,523); San Antonio, TX
February 19, 2025; 7:00 pm, ESPN+		UAB	W 80–71	7–18 (5–9)	21 – Welch	10 – Welch	6 – Welch	Elma Roane Fieldhouse (688); Memphis, TN
February 22, 2025; 6:00 pm, ESPN+		at South Florida	L 70–80	7–19 (5–10)	18 – Boler	7 – A. Smith	7 – Welch	Yuengling Center (2,928); Tampa, FL
February 25, 2025; 7:00 pm, ESPN+		Temple	L 79–91	7–20 (5–11)	22 – Boler	12 – A. Smith	4 – Sims	Elma Roane Fieldhouse (948); Memphis, TN
March 1, 2025; 2:00 pm, ESPN+		Tulsa	L 79–81	7–21 (5–12)	25 – Boler	11 – A. Smith	6 – Eaton	Elma Roane Fieldhouse (1,811); Memphis, TN
March 4, 2025; 6:00 pm, ESPN+		at Florida Atlantic	L 62–69	7–22 (5–13)	21 – T. Smith	8 – Welch	6 – Welch	Eleanor R. Baldwin Arena (808); Boca Raton, FL
AAC tournament
March 9, 2025; 6:00 p.m., ESPN+	(10)	vs. (7) East Carolina; Second round	L 45–64	7–23	13 – Eaton	11 – A. Smith	4 – Welch	Dickies Arena; Fort Worth, TX
*Non-conference game. ^{#}Rankings from AP Poll. (#) Tournament seedings in parentheses. All times are in Central.
