= 2024–25 Florida Atlantic Owls women's basketball team =

American college basketball season

2024–25 Florida Atlantic Owls women's basketball
- Conference: American Athletic Conference
- Record: 11–21 (3–15 AAC)
- Head coach: Jennifer Sullivan (4th season)
- Assistant coaches: Jessica Jackson; Alex Varlan; Jason Rasnake
- Home arena: Eleanor R. Baldwin Arena

2024–25 American Athletic Conference women's basketball standings
| | Conf. | | | | Overall |
| Team | W | | L | PCT | W | | L | PCT |
|---|---|---|---|---|---|---|---|---|
| UTSA | 17 | – | 1 | .944 | 26 | – | 5 | .839 |
| North Texas | 15 | – | 3 | .833 | 25 | – | 9 | .735 |
| South Florida † | 13 | – | 4 | .765 | 23 | – | 11 | .676 |
| Temple | 13 | – | 5 | .722 | 20 | – | 11 | .645 |
| Tulsa | 11 | – | 7 | .611 | 17 | – | 15 | .531 |
| Tulane | 9 | – | 8 | .529 | 17 | – | 13 | .567 |
| East Carolina | 8 | – | 10 | .444 | 17 | – | 15 | .531 |
| UAB | 7 | – | 11 | .389 | 16 | – | 16 | .500 |
| Rice | 7 | – | 11 | .389 | 17 | – | 17 | .500 |
| Memphis | 5 | – | 13 | .278 | 7 | – | 23 | .233 |
| Wichita State | 4 | – | 14 | .222 | 10 | – | 22 | .313 |
| Charlotte | 4 | – | 14 | .222 | 11 | – | 21 | .344 |
| Florida Atlantic | 3 | – | 15 | .167 | 11 | – | 21 | .344 |
† 2025 AAC tournament winner

The 2024–25 Florida Atlantic Owls women's basketball team represented Florida Atlantic University during the 2024–25 NCAA Division I women's basketball season. The Owls, led by fourth-year head coach Jennifer Sullivan, played their home games at Eleanor R. Baldwin Arena in Boca Raton, Florida as second-year members of the American Athletic Conference.

== Previous season ==
The Owls finished the 2023–24 season 11–19, 6–12 in AAC play to finish in 12th place. They were defeated by Wichita State in the first round of the AAC tournament.

== Roster ==
2024–25 Florida Atlantic Owls women's basketball team
Players
Coaches

| Pos. | # | Name | Height | Year | Previous school | Hometown |
|---|---|---|---|---|---|---|
| G | 1 | Mya Perry | 5 ft 11 in (1.8 m) | Jr | Ohio State | Reynoldsburg, Ohio |
| G | 3 | Kristina Godfrey | 5 ft 10 in (1.78 m) | So | Miami Country Day School | Miami, Florida |
| G | 6 | Erin Rodgers | 6 ft 0 in (1.83 m) | Fr | Grayson High School | Lawrenceville, Georgia |
| G | 8 | Stefanie Ingram | 5 ft 8 in (1.73 m) | RS So | Georgia | Orlando, Florida |
| G | 11 | Ta'Ziah Jenks | 6 ft 0 in (1.83 m) | RS Sr | Cincinnati | Louisville, Kentucky |
| F | 12 | Alana Rouser | 6 ft 0 in (1.83 m) | Fr | Germantown High School | Madison, Mississippi |
| C | 13 | Evie Van Der Woude | 6 ft 5 in (1.96 m) | So | Calandlyceum | Zwolle, Netherlands |
| C | 16 | Lovisa Asbrink Hose | 6 ft 6 in (1.98 m) | Fr | Luleå Gymnasieskola | Stockholm, Sweden |
| F | 21 | Maria Myklebust | 6 ft 1 in (1.85 m) | Sr | Vermont | Asker, Norway |
| G | 23 | Jada Moore | 5 ft 11 in (1.8 m) | GS | Kansas State | Denver, Colorado |
| G | 24 | Sydney Mains | 5 ft 10 in (1.78 m) | Fr | Knoxville Catholic High School | Knoxville, Tennessee |
| G | 31 | Zahira Arizmendi | 5 ft 8 in (1.73 m) | So | Middle Tennessee | Madrid, Spain |
| F | 33 | Emaya Lewis | 6 ft 3 in (1.91 m) | Fr | Loganville High School | Loganville, Georgia |

Head coach

- Jennifer Sullivan (Memphis)

Assistant coach(es)

- Jessica Jackson (Western Carolina)
- Alex Varlan (Tennessee)
- Jason Rasnake (NC State)

Legend

- (C) Team captain
- (S) Suspended
- (I) Ineligible
- (W) Walk-on
- Injured
- Current redshirt

Roster
Last update: December 22, 2024

== Schedule and results ==
| Date time, TV | Rank^{#} | Opponent^{#} | Result | Record | High points | High rebounds | High assists | Site (attendance) city, state |
Exhibition
| October 29, 2024*; 7:00 pm | | Fort Lauderdale | W 111–29 | – | 17 – Tied | 11 – Jenks | 8 – Tied | Eleanor R. Baldwin Arena; Boca Raton, FL |
Non-conference regular season
| November 4, 2024*; 7:00 pm, SECN+ | | at Florida | L 54–82 | 0–1 | 18 – Moore | 12 – Rouser | 2 – Tied | O'Connell Center (1,288); Gainesville, FL |
| November 9, 2024*; 2:00 pm, ESPN+ | | Mercer | W 58–48 | 1–1 | 18 – Perry | 8 – Rodgers | 5 – Ingram | Eleanor R. Baldwin Arena (774); Boca Raton, FL |
| November 13, 2024*; 11:00 am, ESPN+ | | North Florida | W 50–41 | 2–1 | 13 – Rodgers | 10 – Tied | 5 – Moore | Eleanor R. Baldwin Arena (1,211); Boca Raton, FL |
| November 16, 2024*; 2:00 pm, ESPN+ | | Bethune–Cookman | W 78–49 | 3–1 | 16 – Perry | 8 – Lewis | 7 – Moore | Eleanor R. Baldwin Arena; Boca Raton, FL |
| November 19, 2024*; 7:00 pm, ESPN+ | | at Stetson | L 63–75 | 3–2 | 17 – Moore | 8 – Jenks | 5 – Ingram | Insight Credit Union Arena (293); DeLand, FL |
| November 23, 2024*; 1:00 pm, ESPN+ | | at FIU | W 62–52 | 4–2 | 22 – Perry | 6 – Rouser | 8 – Ingram | Ocean Bank Convocation Center (590); Miami, FL |
| November 29, 2024*; 2:00 pm, ESPN+ | | Manhattan; Thanksgiving Classic | W 65–50 | 5–2 | 12 – Rodgers | 9 – Rouser | 7 – Ingram | Eleanor R. Baldwin Arena (524); Boca Raton, FL |
| December 1, 2024*; 2:00 pm, ESPN+ | | Austin Peay; Thanksgiving Classic | L 58–59 | 5–3 | 14 – Perry | 7 – Rodgers | 2 – Tied | Eleanor R. Baldwin Arena (462); Boca Raton, FL |
| December 4, 2024*; 7:30 pm, ESPN+ | | at No. 9 TCU | L 42–78 | 5–4 | 13 – Tied | 11 – Moore | 3 – Moore | Schollmaier Arena (1,968); Fort Worth, TX |
| December 13, 2024*; 7:00 pm, ESPN+ | | Kennesaw State | W 71–56 | 6–4 | 20 – Moore | 7 – Lewis | 5 – Ingram | Eleanor R. Baldwin Arena (516); Boca Raton, FL |
| December 18, 2024*; 2:00 pm | | vs. Georgia Southern; GCU Christmas Classic | W 71–66 ^{OT} | 7–4 | 27 – Perry | 13 – Rodgers | 13 – Ingram | Global Credit Union Arena (107); Phoenix, AZ |
| December 19, 2024*; 4:30 pm, ESPN+ | | at Grand Canyon; GCU Christmas Classic | L 60–81 | 7–5 | 15 – Perry | 5 – Tied | 7 – Ingram | Global Credit Union Arena (134); Phoenix, AZ |
| December 21, 2024*; 12:00 pm | | vs. Wright State; GCU Christmas Classic | W 68–52 | 8–5 | 20 – Moore | 8 – Jenks | 6 – Ingram | Global Credit Union Arena (101); Phoenix, AZ |
AAC regular season
| December 29, 2024; 2:00 pm, ESPN+ | | Tulane | L 71–91 | 8–6 (0–1) | 23 – Jenks | 8 – Lewis | 4 – Ingram | Eleanor R. Baldwin Arena (463); Boca Raton, FL |
| January 4, 2025; 1:00 pm, ESPN+ | | at East Carolina | W 64–48 | 9–6 (1–1) | 29 – Perry | 13 – Jenks | 5 – Ingram | Williams Arena (1,335); Greenville, NC |
| January 8, 2025; 7:00 pm, ESPN+ | | Temple | L 69–75 ^{OT} | 9–7 (1–2) | 24 – Moore | 18 – Jenks | 6 – Ingram | Eleanor R. Baldwin Arena (461); Boca Raton, FL |
| January 11, 2025; 2:00 pm, ESPN+ | | UAB | L 61–73 | 9–8 (1–3) | 16 – Ingram | 9 – Asbrink Hose | 4 – Ingram | Eleanor R. Baldwin Arena (463); Boca Raton, FL |
| January 15, 2025; 7:30 pm, ESPN+ | | at Tulsa | L 64–79 | 9–9 (1–4) | 20 – Perry | 11 – Jenks | 5 – Jenks | Reynolds Center (1,044); Tulsa, OK |
| January 18, 2025; 6:00 pm, ESPN+ | | at South Florida | L 59–85 | 9–10 (1–5) | 14 – Perry | 6 – Moore | 5 – Tied | Yuengling Center (8,636); Tampa, FL |
| January 22, 2025; 7:00 pm, ESPN+ | | Charlotte | L 68–75 | 9–11 (1–6) | 16 – Perry | 8 – Rouser | 10 – Ingram | Eleanor R. Baldwin Arena (422); Boca Raton, FL |
| January 25, 2025; 2:00 pm, ESPN+ | | North Texas | L 61–73 | 9–12 (1–7) | 23 – Jenks | 5 – Tied | 4 – Moore | Eleanor R. Baldwin Arena (718); Boca Raton, FL |
| January 29, 2025; 7:30 pm, ESPN+ | | at Tulane | L 52–68 | 9–13 (1–8) | 15 – Ingram | 9 – Moore | 5 – Moore | Devlin Fieldhouse (818); New Orleans, LA |
| February 1, 2025; 1:00 pm, ESPN+ | | Rice | W 66–61 | 10–13 (2–8) | 25 – Ingram | 12 – Rouser | 5 – Ingram | Eleanor R. Baldwin Arena (1,330); Boca Raton, FL |
| February 5, 2025; 7:00 pm, ESPN+ | | at Wichita State | L 44–54 | 10–14 (2–9) | 22 – Perry | 8 – Asbrink Hose | 7 – Moore | Charles Koch Arena (993); Wichita, KS |
| February 8, 2025; 3:00 pm, ESPN+ | | at Memphis | L 60–73 | 10–15 (2–10) | 15 – Moore | 8 – Tied | 4 – Tied | Elma Roane Fieldhouse (1,412); Memphis, TN |
| February 15, 2025; 2:00 pm, ESPN+ | | South Florida | L 62–72 | 10–16 (2–11) | 22 – Perry | 7 – Tied | 5 – Ingram | Eleanor R. Baldwin Arena (1,215); Boca Raton, FL |
| February 18, 2025; 8:00 pm, ESPN+ | | at Rice | L 39–72 | 10–17 (2–12) | 12 – Moore | 6 – Rouser | 1 – Tied | Tudor Fieldhouse (501); Houston, TX |
| February 22, 2025; 4:00 pm, ESPN+ | | at Charlotte | L 53–58 | 10–18 (2–13) | 14 – Rouser | 6 – Moore | 6 – Ingram | Dale F. Halton Arena (715); Charlotte, NC |
| February 26, 2025; 7:00 pm, ESPN+ | | East Carolina | L 70–80 | 10–19 (2–14) | 22 – Jenks | 8 – Moore | 8 – Ingram | Eleanor R. Baldwin Arena (910); Boca Raton, FL |
| March 1, 2025; 1:00 pm, ESPN+ | | at UTSA | L 42–60 | 10–20 (2–15) | 17 – Ingram | 7 – Rouser | 4 – Moore | Convocation Center (2,250); San Antonio, TX |
| March 4, 2025; 7:00 pm, ESPN+ | | Memphis | W 69–62 | 11–20 (3–15) | 31 – Perry | 9 – Moore | 8 – Ingram | Eleanor R. Baldwin Arena (808); Boca Raton, FL |
AAC tournament
| March 8, 2025; 1:00 pm, ESPN+ | (13) | vs. (12) Charlotte; First round | L 51–55 | 11–22 | 13 – Moore | 8 – Rouser | 9 – Ingram | Dickies Arena (259); Fort Worth, TX |
*Non-conference game. ^{#}Rankings from AP Poll. (#) Tournament seedings in parentheses. All times are in Eastern.
