= 2025 American Athletic Conference women's basketball tournament =

- Classification: Division I
- Season: 2024–25
- Teams: 13
- Site: Super Pit and Dickies Arena; Denton, Texas and Fort Worth, Texas
- Champions: South Florida (2nd title)
- Winning coach: Jose Fernandez (2nd title)
- MVP: Carla Britto (South Florida)
- Television: ESPN+, ESPNU, ESPN2, ESPN

2024–25 American Athletic Conference women's basketball standings
	Conf.				Overall
Team	W		L	PCT	W		L	PCT
UTSA	17	–	1	.944	26	–	5	.839
North Texas	15	–	3	.833	25	–	9	.735
South Florida †	13	–	4	.765	23	–	11	.676
Temple	13	–	5	.722	20	–	11	.645
Tulsa	11	–	7	.611	17	–	15	.531
Tulane	9	–	8	.529	17	–	13	.567
East Carolina	8	–	10	.444	17	–	15	.531
UAB	7	–	11	.389	16	–	16	.500
Rice	7	–	11	.389	17	–	17	.500
Memphis	5	–	13	.278	7	–	23	.233
Wichita State	4	–	14	.222	10	–	22	.313
Charlotte	4	–	14	.222	11	–	21	.344
Florida Atlantic	3	–	15	.167	11	–	21	.344
† 2025 AAC tournament winner

The 2025 American Athletic Conference women's basketball tournament was the postseason women's basketball tournament for the American Athletic Conference for the 2024–25 season. The tournament was held from March 8–12, 2025, at Dickies Arena in Fort Worth, Texas.

This was the last conference tournament under the American Athletic Conference name. In July 2025, the conference dropped the word "Athletic" from its name, renaming itself the American Conference.

== Seeds ==
All 13 conference teams participated in the tournament. Teams were seeded by conference record. The top four teams received byes to the quarterfinals.

Tiebreakers were applied as needed to properly seed the teams.

Seed	School	Conference record	Tiebreaker
1	UTSA	17–1	
2	North Texas	15–3	
3	South Florida	13–4	2–0 vs Temple
4	Temple	13–5	0–2 vs USF
5	Tulsa	11–7	
6	Tulane	9–8	
7	East Carolina	8–10	
8	UAB	7–11	1–0 vs. South Florida
9	Rice	7–11	0–2 vs. South Florida
10	Memphis	5–13	
11	Wichita State	4–14	1–0 vs. Rice
12	Charlotte	4–14	0–1 vs. Rice
13	Florida Atlantic	3–15	

== Schedule ==
Game	Time	Matchup	Score	Television
First round – Saturday, March 8 – Super Pit, Denton, TX
1	12:00 pm	No. 12 Charlotte vs. No. 13 Florida Atlantic	55–51	ESPN+
Second round – Sunday, March 9
2	11:30 am	No. 8 UAB vs. No. 9 Rice	63–76	ESPN+
3	1:30 pm	No. 5 Tulsa vs. No. 12 Charlotte	66–71	ESPN+
4	6:00 pm	No. 7 East Carolina vs. No. 10 Memphis	64–45	ESPN+
5	8:00 pm	No. 6 Tulane vs. No. 11 Wichita State	69–63	ESPN+
Quarterfinals – Monday, March 10
6	12:00 pm	No. 1 UTSA vs. No. 9 Rice	58–62	ESPN+
7	2:00 pm	No. 4 Temple vs. No. 12 Charlotte	65–34	ESPN+
8	6:00 pm	No. 2 North Texas vs. No. 7 East Carolina	69–58	ESPN+
9	8:00 pm	No. 3 South Florida vs. No. 6 Tulane	69–59	ESPN+
Semifinals – Tuesday, March 11
10	2:00 pm	No. 4 Temple vs. No. 9 Rice	49–67	ESPN+
11	4:00 pm	No. 2 North Texas vs. No. 3 South Florida	48–58	ESPN+
Championship – Wednesday, March 12
12	6:00 pm	No. 3 South Florida vs. No. 9 Rice	69–62	ESPNU
*Game times in CST for the first round and CDT from the second round onward. ()-Rankings denote tournament seeding.

== Bracket ==
First round Saturday, March 8
12	Charlotte	55
13	Florida Atlantic	51

Second round Sunday, March 9
8	UAB	63
9	Rice	76
5	Tulsa	66
12	Charlotte	71
7	East Carolina	64
10	Memphis	45
6	Tulane	69
11	Wichita State	63

Quarterfinals; Monday, March 10
1	UTSA	58
9	Rice	62
4	Temple	65
12	Charlotte	34
2	North Texas	69
7	East Carolina	58
3	South Florida	69
6	Tulane	59

Semifinals; Tuesday, March 11
9	Rice	67
4	Temple	49
2	North Texas	48
3	South Florida	58

Championship; Wednesday, March 12
9	Rice	62
3	South Florida	69

== See also ==
- 2025 American Athletic Conference men's basketball tournament
- American Athletic Conference women's basketball tournament
- American Athletic Conference
