= 2024–25 Tulane Green Wave women's basketball team =

American college basketball season

2024–25 Tulane Green Wave women's basketball
- Conference: American Athletic Conference
- Record: 17–13 (9–8 AAC)
- Head coach: Ashley Langford (1st season)
- Assistant coaches: Darrick Gibbs; Joe Silvestri; Rena Wakama; Shyan Mwai; Daishai Almond
- Home arena: Devlin Fieldhouse

2024–25 American Athletic Conference women's basketball standings
| | Conf. | | | | Overall |
| Team | W | | L | PCT | W | | L | PCT |
|---|---|---|---|---|---|---|---|---|
| UTSA | 17 | – | 1 | .944 | 26 | – | 5 | .839 |
| North Texas | 15 | – | 3 | .833 | 25 | – | 9 | .735 |
| South Florida † | 13 | – | 4 | .765 | 23 | – | 11 | .676 |
| Temple | 13 | – | 5 | .722 | 20 | – | 11 | .645 |
| Tulsa | 11 | – | 7 | .611 | 17 | – | 15 | .531 |
| Tulane | 9 | – | 8 | .529 | 17 | – | 13 | .567 |
| East Carolina | 8 | – | 10 | .444 | 17 | – | 15 | .531 |
| UAB | 7 | – | 11 | .389 | 16 | – | 16 | .500 |
| Rice | 7 | – | 11 | .389 | 17 | – | 17 | .500 |
| Memphis | 5 | – | 13 | .278 | 7 | – | 23 | .233 |
| Wichita State | 4 | – | 14 | .222 | 10 | – | 22 | .313 |
| Charlotte | 4 | – | 14 | .222 | 11 | – | 21 | .344 |
| Florida Atlantic | 3 | – | 15 | .167 | 11 | – | 21 | .344 |
† 2025 AAC tournament winner

The 2024–25 Tulane Green Wave women's basketball team represented Tulane University during the 2024–25 NCAA Division I women's basketball season. The Green Wave, led by first-year head coach Ashley Langford, played their home games at Devlin Fieldhouse in New Orleans, Louisiana as members of the American Athletic Conference.

== Previous season ==
The Green Wave finished the 2023–24 season 12–20, 3–15 in AAC play to finish in 14th (last) place. They upset SMU and Charlotte, before falling to Temple in the quarterfinals of the AAC tournament.

On March 19, 2024, head coach Lisa Stockton announced her retirement, having lead the Green Wave for 30 seasons. On April 2, Stony Brook head coach and Tulane alum Ashley Langford announced that she would be stepping down from her position at Stony Brook, in order to take the same position at Tulane.

== Roster ==
2024–25 Tulane Green Wave women's basketball team
Players
Coaches

| Pos. | # | Name | Height | Year | Previous school | Hometown |
|---|---|---|---|---|---|---|
| G | 0 | Kyren Whittington | 5 ft 9 in (1.75 m) | RS Sr | Louisiana–Monroe | Folsom, Louisiana |
| G | 1 | Kayla Hampton | 5 ft 9 in (1.75 m) | Jr | Kilgore College | Bossier City, Louisiana |
| G | 2 | Victoria Keenan | 5 ft 7 in (1.7 m) | GS | Stony Brook | Bethlehem, Pennsylvania |
| F | 3 | Kianni Westbrook | 6 ft 3 in (1.91 m) | GS | Oakland | Augusta, Georgia |
| G | 5 | Jaylee Womack | 5 ft 10 in (1.78 m) | RS So | Ponchatoula High School | Springfield, Louisiana |
| G | 7 | Karma Wynn | 5 ft 4 in (1.63 m) | Fr | Pelham High School | Birmingham, Alabama |
| G | 9 | Kendall Sneed | 5 ft 8 in (1.73 m) | Fr | Hardin-Jefferson High School | China, Texas |
| F | 11 | Dyllan Hanna | 6 ft 2 in (1.88 m) | Jr | Florida Atlantic | St. Augustine, Florida |
| G | 12 | Ana Baker | 6 ft 1 in (1.85 m) | Fr | Vandegrift High School | Austin, Texas |
| G | 13 | Sadie Shores | 5 ft 10 in (1.78 m) | Fr | Woodgrove High School | Purcellville, Virginia |
| F | 22 | Sherese Pittman | 6 ft 2 in (1.88 m) | Sr | Stony Brook | Richmond, Virginia |
| F | 23 | Amira Mabry | 6 ft 0 in (1.83 m) | Jr | Judson High School | Converse, Texas |
| G | 24 | Kierra Middleton | 5 ft 7 in (1.7 m) | Sr | Midlothian High School | Arlington, Texas |
| F | 33 | Lily Ba | 6 ft 3 in (1.91 m) | So | Blue Valley West High School | Overland Park, Kansas |

Head coach

- Ashley Langford (Tulane)

Assistant coach(es)

- Darrick Gibbs (Wofford)
- Joe Silvestri (Central Florida)
- Rena Wakama (Western Carolina)
- Shyan Mwai (LIU)
- Daishai Almond (Stony Brook)

Legend

- (C) Team captain
- (S) Suspended
- (I) Ineligible
- (W) Walk-on
- Injured
- Current redshirt

Roster
Last update: December 21, 2024

== Schedule and results ==
| Date time, TV | Rank^{#} | Opponent^{#} | Result | Record | High points | High rebounds | High assists | Site (attendance) city, state |
Exhibition
| November 2, 2024*; 2:00 pm | | at Loyola (New Orleans) | W 104–57 | – | 21 – Pittman | 11 – Mabry | 10 – Shores | The Den; New Orleans, LA |
Non-conference regular season
| November 7, 2024*; 6:30 pm, ESPN+ | | Nicholls | L 63–65 | 0–1 | 14 – Pittman | 13 – Hanna | 5 – Sneed | Devlin Fieldhouse (848); New Orleans, LA |
| November 12, 2024*; 6:00 pm, SECN | | at Missouri | L 52–60 | 0–2 | 18 – Pittman | 7 – Mabry | 3 – Whittington | Mizzou Arena (2,627); Columbia, MO |
| November 16, 2024*; 2:00 pm, ESPN+ | | Grambling State | W 89–65 | 1–2 | 19 – Mabry | 8 – Tied | 7 – Whittington | Devlin Fieldhouse (532); New Orleans, LA |
| November 20, 2024*; 7:00 pm, SECN+ | | at No. 7 LSU | L 74–85 | 1–3 | 24 – Whittington | 8 – Hanna | 3 – Tied | Pete Maravich Assembly Center (10,005); Baton Rouge, LA |
| November 24, 2024*; 2:00 pm, ESPN+ | | Jackson State | W 77–37 | 2–3 | 22 – Whittington | 11 – Sneed | 6 – Whittington | Devlin Fieldhouse (675); New Orleans, LA |
| November 28, 2024*; 12:00 pm | | vs. Florida; St. Pete Showcase | W 83–81 | 3–3 | 22 – Sneed | 8 – Pittman | 11 – Sneed | McArthur Center (273); St. Petersburg, FL |
| November 30, 2024*; 12:00 pm | | vs. Northern Arizona; St. Pete Showcase | L 70–87 | 3–4 | 23 – Whittington | 10 – Pittman | 5 – Sneed | McArthur Center (212); St. Petersburg, FL |
| December 10, 2024*; 4:00 pm, ESPN+ | | North Dakota State | W 67–61 | 4–4 | 22 – Pittman | 8 – Tied | 4 – Sneed | Devlin Fieldhouse (1,076); New Orleans, LA |
| December 15, 2024*; 2:00 pm, ESPN+ | | Mercer | W 73–46 | 5–4 | 15 – Mabry | 9 – Pittman | 4 – Pittman | Devlin Fieldhouse (716); New Orleans, LA |
| December 20, 2024*; 2:30 pm, ESPN+ | | Alabama A&M; Tulane Holiday Tournament | W 53–46 | 6–4 | 15 – Whittington | 10 – Tied | 4 – Tied | Devlin Fieldhouse (586); New Orleans, LA |
| December 21, 2024*; 2:30 pm, ESPN+ | | Louisiana–Monroe; Tulane Holiday Tournament | W 68–63 | 7–4 | 21 – Mabry | 12 – Mabry | 5 – Sneed | Devlin Fieldhouse (142); New Orleans, LA |
AAC regular season
| December 29, 2024; 1:00 pm, ESPN+ | | at Florida Atlantic | W 91–71 | 8–4 (1–0) | 26 – Mabry | 11 – Mabry | 5 – Tied | Eleanor R. Baldwin Arena (463); Boca Raton, FL |
| January 1, 2025; 2:00 pm, ESPN+ | | Rice | W 72–64 | 8–5 (1–1) | 21 – Mabry | 9 – Mabry | 4 – Pittman | Devlin Fieldhouse (677); New Orleans, LA |
| January 4, 2025; 3:00 pm, ESPN+ | | at Charlotte | W 79–58 | 9–5 (2–1) | 20 – Keenan | 9 – Tied | 8 – Whittington | Dale F. Halton Arena (662); Charlotte, NC |
| January 8, 2025; 6:30 pm, ESPN+ | | North Texas | W 65–62 | 10–5 (3–1) | 20 – Pittman | 9 – Pittman | 6 – Whittington | Devlin Fieldhouse (555); New Orleans, LA |
| January 11, 2025; 1:00 pm, ESPN+ | | at East Carolina | L 64–75 | 10–6 (3–2) | 15 – Mabry | 11 – Pittman | 2 – Tied | Williams Arena (1,022); Greenville, NC |
| January 15, 2025; 6:00 pm, ESPN+ | | at Wichita State | W 66–62 | 11–6 (4–2) | 20 – Mabry | 13 – Mabry | 7 – Sneed | Charles Koch Arena (956); Wichita, KS |
| January 18, 2025; 2:00 pm, ESPN+ | | Memphis | L 58–68 | 11–7 (4–3) | 17 – Keenan | 10 – Pittman | 7 – Sneed | Devlin Fieldhouse (801); New Orleans, LA |
| January 22, 2025; 6:30 pm, ESPN+ | | South Florida | Postponed, rescheduled for March 6th | | | | | Devlin Fieldhouse; New Orleans, LA |
| January 25, 2025; 1:00 pm, ESPN+ | | at Temple | W 62–60 | 12–7 (5–3) | 19 – Mabry | 6 – Pittman | 4 – Whittington | Liacouras Center (1,435); Philadelphia, PA |
| January 29, 2025; 6:30 pm, ESPN+ | | Florida Atlantic | W 68–52 | 13–7 (6–3) | 15 – Keenan | 10 – Pittman | 7 – Pittman | Devlin Fieldhouse (818); New Orleans, LA |
| February 1, 2025; 2:00 pm, ESPN+ | | UAB | W 72–55 | 14–7 (7–3) | 28 – Whittington | 13 – Hanna | 7 – Sneed | Devlin Fieldhouse (708); New Orleans, LA |
| February 5, 2025; 7:00 pm, ESPN+ | | at Rice | W 78–67 | 15–7 (8–3) | 25 – Pittman | 8 – Pittman | 5 – Sneed | Tudor Fieldhouse (686); Houston, TX |
| February 9, 2025; 1:00 pm, ESPNU | | at North Texas | L 64–69 | 15–8 (8–4) | 16 – Sneed | 12 – Mabry | 4 – Keenan | The Super Pit (1,803); Denton, TX |
| February 15, 2025; 3:00 pm, ESPN+ | | Temple | L 56–73 | 15–9 (8–5) | 15 – Shores | 8 – Mabry | 4 – Shores | Devlin Fieldhouse (727); New Orleans, LA |
| February 19, 2025; 6:30 pm, ESPN+ | | at Tulsa | L 54–73 | 15–10 (8–6) | 21 – Pittman | 8 – Mabry | 4 – Keenan | Reynolds Center (1,136); Tulsa, OK |
| February 22, 2025; 2:00 pm, ESPN+ | | Wichita State | W 68–64 | 16–10 (9–6) | 17 – Pittman | 16 – Pittman | 6 – Sneed | Devlin Fieldhouse (713); New Orleans, LA |
| February 25, 2025; 6:30 pm, ESPN+ | | UTSA | L 73–77 | 16–11 (9–7) | 22 – Whittington | 9 – Pittman | 6 – Sneed | Devlin Fieldhouse; New Orleans, LA |
| March 4, 2025; 6:00 pm, ESPN+ | | at UAB | L 64–66 | 16–12 (9–8) | 18 – Pittman | 8 – Pittman | 4 – Sneed | Bartow Arena (310); Birmingham, AL |
| March 6, 2025; 6:30 pm, ESPN+ | | South Florida | Canceled | | | | | Devlin Fieldhouse; New Orleans, LA |
AAC tournament
| March 9, 2025; 8:00 pm, ESPN+ | (6) | vs. (11) Wichita State; Second round | W 69–63 | 17–12 | 26 – Keenan | 9 – Mabry | 5 – Shores | Dickies Arena (2,393); Fort Worth, TX |
| March 10, 2025; 8:00 pm, ESPN+ | (6) | vs. (3) South Florida; Quarterfinals | L 59–69 | 17–13 | 18 – Sneed | 11 – Pittman | 3 – Tied | Dickies Arena (1,909); Fort Worth, TX |
*Non-conference game. ^{#}Rankings from AP Poll. (#) Tournament seedings in parentheses. All times are in Central.
