= 2024–25 South Florida Bulls women's basketball team =

American college basketball season

2024–25 South Florida Bulls women's basketball

AAC tournament champions

NCAA tournament, First Round
- Conference: American Athletic Conference
- Record: 23–11 (13–4 AAC)
- Head coach: Jose Fernandez (25th season)
- Associate head coach: Michele Woods-Baxter
- Assistant coaches: Bojan Jankovic; Sheila Boykin; Gina Cerezuela Robuste; Justin Keller
- Home arena: Yuengling Center

2024–25 American Athletic Conference women's basketball standings
	Conf.				Overall
Team	W		L	PCT	W		L	PCT
UTSA	17	–	1	.944	26	–	5	.839
North Texas	15	–	3	.833	25	–	9	.735
South Florida †	13	–	4	.765	23	–	11	.676
Temple	13	–	5	.722	20	–	11	.645
Tulsa	11	–	7	.611	17	–	15	.531
Tulane	9	–	8	.529	17	–	13	.567
East Carolina	8	–	10	.444	17	–	15	.531
UAB	7	–	11	.389	16	–	16	.500
Rice	7	–	11	.389	17	–	17	.500
Memphis	5	–	13	.278	7	–	23	.233
Wichita State	4	–	14	.222	10	–	22	.313
Charlotte	4	–	14	.222	11	–	21	.344
Florida Atlantic	3	–	15	.167	11	–	21	.344
† 2025 AAC tournament winner

The 2024–25 South Florida Bulls women's basketball team represented the University of South Florida during the 2024–25 NCAA Division I women's basketball season. The Bulls, led by 25th-year head coach Jose Fernandez, played their home games at Yuengling Center in Tampa, Florida as members of the American Athletic Conference.

== Previous season ==
The Bulls finished the 2023–24 season 19–14, 10–8 in AAC play to finish in a tie for fourth place. They defeated 2023–24 Wichita State Shockers women's basketball team, before falling to UTSA in the quarterfinals of the AAC tournament.

== Offseason ==
=== Departures ===
South Florida departures
Name	Num	Pos.	Height	Year	Hometown	Reason for departure
Caitlin McGee	0	F	6'1"	(redshirt) Junior	Jacksonville, FL	TBD
Maria Alvarez	1	G	5'7"	Senior	Bal Harbour, FL	Graduated
Judit Valero Rodriguez	11	G	5'11"	Freshman	Sant Feliu de Llobregat, Spain	Transferred to FIU
Marina Asensio	12	G	5'8"	Sophomore	Sabadell, Spain	Transferred to Western Michigan
Emma Johansson	14	F/C	6'3"	Sophomore	Jönköping, Sweden	Transferred to California Baptist
Judit Oliva Fernandez	15	F	6'2"	Freshman	El Prat de Llobregat, Spain	Transferred to Long Beach State
Daniela Gonzalez	20	F	6'0"	Sophomore	Jamundí, Colombia	Transferred to South Alabama
Aerial Wilson	22	G	5'10"	(redshirt) Senior	Dundas, ON	Graduated
Evelien Lutje Schipholt	24	F	6'2"	Senior	The Hague, Netherlands	Graduated

=== Incoming ===
South Florida incoming transfers
Name	Num	Pos.	Height	Year	Hometown	Previous school
Mama Dembele	4	G	5'6"	Graduate student	Manlleu, Spain	Missouri
Fatou Diakite	8	F	6'3"	Sophomore	Abiden, Ivory Coast	Charlotte
Ines Piper	14	F	6'0"	Graduate student	Paris, France	Temple
Jennifer Silva	15	C	6'3"	Junior	São Paulo, Brazil	South Plains College

==== Recruiting ====
There was no recruiting class of 2024.

== Roster ==
2024–25 South Florida Bulls women's basketball team
Players
Coaches

Pos.	#	Name	Height	Year	Previous school	Hometown
F	2	Yana Karamfilova	6 ft 2 in (1.88 m)	Fr	Todor Kableshkov High School	Sofia, Bulgaria
G	3	Sammie Puisis	6 ft 1 in (1.85 m)	GS	Florida State	Mason, Ohio
G	4	Mama Dembele	5 ft 6 in (1.68 m)	GS	Missouri	Manlleu, Spain
G	5	Vittoria Blasigh	5 ft 9 in (1.75 m)	So	SPAR Gran Canaria	Udine, Italy
F	8	Fatou Diakite	6 ft 3 in (1.91 m)	So	Charlotte	Abidjan, Ivory Coast
G	10	Janette Aarnio	5 ft 11 in (1.8 m)	Jr	Helsinki Basketball Academy	Vantaa, Finland
G	12	Amy Thompson	5 ft 10 in (1.78 m)	Fr	Stillwater Area High School	Stillwater, Minnesota
F	14	Ines Piper	6 ft 0 in (1.83 m)	GS	Temple	Paris, France
C	15	Jeniffer Silva	6 ft 4 in (1.93 m)	Jr	South Plains College	Recife, Brazil
F	21	L'or Mputu	6 ft 2 in (1.88 m)	Sr	Eastern Florida State College	Kinshasa, DR Congo
G	23	Romi Levy	6 ft 3 in (1.91 m)	RS Sr	Auburn	Herzliya, Israel
G	24	Raina Tomasicka	5 ft 11 in (1.8 m)	Fr	Tarbes GB	Jēkabpils, Latvia
F	55	Carla Brito	5 ft 11 in (1.8 m)	Jr	SPAR Gran Canaria	Puerto del Rosario, Spain

Head coach

- Jose Fernandez (FIU)

Assistant coach(es)

- Michele Woods-Baxter (St. John Fisher)
- Bojan Jankovic (Ozarks)
- Sheila Boykin (LSU)
- Gina Cerezuela Robuste (Coker)
- Justin Keller (South Florida)

Legend

- (C) Team captain
- (S) Suspended
- (I) Ineligible
- (W) Walk-on
- Injured
- Current redshirt

Roster
Last update: December 24, 2024

== Schedule and results ==
Date time, TV	Rank^{#}	Opponent^{#}	Result	Record	High points	High rebounds	High assists	Site (attendance) city, state
Non-conference regular season
November 4, 2024*; 6:00 pm, ESPN+		Bethune–Cookman	W 87–44	1–0	16 – Mputu	8 – Levy	8 – Dembele	Yuengling Center (2,466); Tampa, FL
November 7, 2024*; 7:00 pm, ESPN+		Mount St. Mary's	W 68–51	2–0	25 – Puisis	12 – Mputu	6 – Dembele	Yuengling Center (2,171); Tampa, FL
November 10, 2024*; 4:30 pm, SNY		at No. 2 UConn	L 49–86	2–1	12 – Dembele	6 – Tied	5 – Dembele	Harry A. Gampel Pavilion (10,299); Storrs, CT
November 14, 2024*; 7:00 pm, ESPN+		Vanderbilt	L 49–62	2–2	15 – Blasigh	9 – Brito	5 – Dembele	Yuengling Center (2,606); Tampa, FL
November 17, 2024*; 2:00 pm, ESPN+		UT Rio Grande Valley	W 57–45	3–2	17 – Puisis	7 – Tied	4 – Aarnio	Yuengling Center (2,460); Tampa, FL
November 20, 2024*; 7:00 pm, ESPN+		Jacksonville	W 75–57	4–2	24 – Blasigh	11 – Brito	7 – Dembele	Yuengling Center (2,407); Tampa, FL
November 24, 2024*; 1:00 pm, Peacock		vs. No. 25 Louisville; WBCA State Farm Showcase	L 60–64	4–3	19 – Blasigh	10 – Brito	6 – Dembele	State Farm Field House; Bay Lake, FL
November 29, 2024*; 7:30 pm, FloHoops		vs. Mississippi State; Cayman Islands Classic	L 52–59	4–4	22 – Puisis	12 – Mputu	7 – Dembele	John Gray Gymnasium (1,034); George Town, Cayman Islands
November 30, 2024*; 7:30 pm, FloHoops		vs. No. 17 TCU; Cayman Islands Classic	L 46–87	4–5	16 – Blasigh	8 – Brito	3 – Dembele	John Gray Gymnasium (895); George Town, Cayman Islands
December 5, 2024*; 11:00 am, ESPN+		Merrimack	W 62–43	5–5	13 – Blasigh	6 – Levy	2 – Tied	Yuengling Center (9,821); Tampa, FL
December 15, 2024*; 2:00 pm, SECN		at No. 3 South Carolina	L 62–78	5–6	19 – Puisis	10 – Mputu	7 – Dembele	Colonial Life Arena (16,501); Columbia, SC
December 17, 2024*; 7:00 pm, ESPN+		Northwestern State	W 71–36	6–6	18 – Blasigh	11 – Brito	6 – Dembele	Yuengling Center (1,784); Tampa, FL
December 21, 2024*; 12:00 pm, ESPN2		No. 9 Duke	W 65–56	7–6	23 – Puisis	11 – Mputu	4 – Dembele	Yuengling Center (5,735); Tampa, FL
AAC regular season
December 30, 2024; 1:00 pm, ESPN2		at Rice	W 74–64	8–6 (1–0)	23 – Puisis	6 – Tied	4 – Dembele	Tudor Fieldhouse (1,051); Houston, TX
January 1, 2025; 7:00 pm, ESPN+		Charlotte	W 69–68 ^{OT}	9–6 (2–0)	17 – Mputu	7 – Mputu	9 – Dembele	Yuengling Center (1,987); Tampa, FL
January 4, 2025; 7:00 pm, ESPN+		Temple	W 65–56	10–6 (3–0)	26 – Puisis	10 – Brito	7 – Aarnio	Yuengling Center (2,370); Tampa, FL
January 8, 2025; 7:00 pm, ESPN+		at Wichita State	W 72–46	11–6 (4–0)	16 – Puisis	10 – Mputu	6 – Dembele	Charles Koch Arena (809); Wichita, KS
January 11, 2025; 3:00 pm, ESPN+		at North Texas	L 65–72	11–7 (4–1)	16 – Puisis	10 – Mputu	3 – Dembele	The Super Pit (1,602); Denton, TX
January 14, 2025; 7:00 pm, ESPN+		UAB	L 61–62	11–8 (4–2)	21 – Brito	12 – Brito	3 – Tied	Yuengling Center (2,066); Tampa, FL
January 18, 2025; 6:00 pm, ESPN+		Florida Atlantic	W 85–59	12–8 (5–2)	15 – Puisis	15 – Brito	6 – Brito	Yuengling Center (8,636); Tampa, FL
January 22, 2025; 7:30 pm, ESPN+		at Tulane	Cancelled (severe winter weather)					Devlin Fieldhouse; New Orleans, LA
January 25, 2025; 4:00 pm, ESPN+		at East Carolina	W 63–60	13–8 (6–2)	19 – Blasigh	9 – Mputu	5 – Brito	Williams Arena (1,116); Greenville, NC
January 29, 2025; 7:00 pm, ESPN+		UTSA	W 75–63	14–8 (7–2)	21 – Levy	10 – Mputu	11 – Dembele	Yuengling Center (2,754); Tampa, FL
February 1, 2025; 7:00 pm, ESPN+		North Texas	W 65–58	15–8 (8–2)	15 – Blasigh	10 – Mputu	5 – Tied	Yuengling Center (2,572); Tampa, FL
February 8, 2025; 2:00 pm, ESPN+		at Temple	W 64–57	16–8 (9–2)	15 – Puisis	9 – Brito	8 – Dembele	Liacouras Center (1,505); Philadelphia, PA
February 12, 2025; 7:00 pm, ESPN+		Rice	W 82–77 ^{3OT}	17–8 (10–2)	17 – Puisis	10 – Brito	11 – Dembele	Yuengling Center (2,225); Tampa, FL
February 15, 2025; 2:00 pm, ESPN+		at Florida Atlantic	W 74–62	18–8 (11–2)	23 – Puisis	9 – Tied	7 – Dembele	Eleanor R. Baldwin Arena (1,215); Boca Raton, FL
February 18, 2025; 6:30 pm, ESPN+		at Charlotte	W 70–52	19–8 (12–2)	19 – Blasigh	12 – Brito	6 – Dembele	Dale F. Halton Arena (478); Charlotte, NC
February 22, 2025; 7:00 pm, ESPN+		Memphis	W 80–70	20–8 (13–2)	34 – Puisis	11 – Brito	6 – Tied	Yuengling Center (2,928); Tampa, FL
February 26, 2025; 7:30 pm, ESPN+		at Tulsa	L 58–66	20–9 (13–3)	17 – Blasigh	12 – Mputu	3 – Blasigh	Reynolds Center (1,588); Tulsa, OK
March 1, 2025; 7:00 pm, ESPN+		East Carolina	L 57–66	20–10 (13–4)	15 – Puisis	5 – Tied	6 – Dembele	Yuengling Center (2,664); Tampa, FL
AAC tournament
March 10, 2025; 9:00 pm, ESPN+	(3)	vs. (6) Tulane; Quarterfinals	W 69–59	21–10	16 – Blasigh	17 – Brito	7 – Dembele	Dickies Arena (1,909); Fort Worth, TX
March 11, 2025; 9:00 pm, ESPN+	(3)	vs. (2) North Texas; Semifinals	W 58–48	22–10	13 – Blasigh	21 – Mputu	5 – Dembele	Dickies Arena (2,227); Fort Worth, TX
March 12, 2025; 7:00 pm, ESPNU	(3)	vs. (9) Rice; Championship	W 69–62	23–10	20 – Blasigh	9 – Tied	8 – Dembele	Dickies Arena (3,795); Fort Worth, TX
NCAA tournament
March 21, 2025; 8:00 pm, ESPN	(12 B3)	vs. (5 B3) No. 20 Tennessee; First Round	L 66–101	23–11	28 – Puisis	8 – Brito	4 – Blasigh	Value City Arena (6,584); Columbus, OH
*Non-conference game. ^{#}Rankings from AP Poll. (#) Tournament seedings in parentheses. B3=Birmingham. All times are in Eastern.
