= Elma Roane Fieldhouse =

Arena in Memphis, Tennessee

- Interactive map of Elma Roane Fieldhouse
- Location: 495 Zach Curlin, Memphis, TN 38152
- Coordinates: 35.118369°N 89.935675°W
- Capacity: 2,565

Tenant
- Memphis Tigers women's basketball

The Elma Roane Fieldhouse is a 2,565-seat arena in Memphis, Tennessee. It is the home of the University of Memphis Tigers women's basketball team. Prior to moving to the Mid-South Coliseum in 1966, it was also home to the men's basketball team as well. The arena opened in 1951, replacing the original Memorial Gymnasium, and is named after Elma Roane, a former coach and administrator of the Tigers women's teams who helped return women's sports to varsity status in 1972–73. The arena was also the site of a Led Zeppelin concert on their first tour of the U.S.

== See also ==
- List of NCAA Division I basketball arenas
