= 2024–25 FIU Panthers women's basketball team =

American college basketball season

2024–25 FIU Panthers women's basketball
- Conference: Conference USA
- Record: 11–19 (7–11 C-USA)
- Head coach: Jesyka Burks-Wiley (4th season)
- Assistant coaches: Christelle N'Garsanet; Dan Wendt; Heather Karner
- Home arena: Ocean Bank Convocation Center

2024–25 Conference USA women's basketball standings
| | Conf. | | | | Overall |
| Team | W | | L | PCT | W | | L | PCT |
|---|---|---|---|---|---|---|---|---|
| Liberty † | 16 | – | 2 | .889 | 26 | – | 7 | .788 |
| Middle Tennessee | 16 | – | 2 | .889 | 26 | – | 9 | .743 |
| Western Kentucky | 13 | – | 5 | .722 | 23 | – | 9 | .719 |
| New Mexico State | 10 | – | 8 | .556 | 18 | – | 16 | .529 |
| Louisiana Tech | 8 | – | 10 | .444 | 18 | – | 16 | .529 |
| FIU | 7 | – | 11 | .389 | 11 | – | 19 | .367 |
| Kennesaw State | 7 | – | 11 | .389 | 13 | – | 18 | .419 |
| Sam Houston | 5 | – | 13 | .278 | 13 | – | 17 | .433 |
| Jacksonville State | 4 | – | 14 | .222 | 10 | – | 20 | .333 |
| UTEP | 4 | – | 14 | .222 | 11 | – | 19 | .367 |
† 2025 CUSA tournament winner

The 2024–25 FIU Panthers women's basketball team represented Florida International University during the 2024–25 NCAA Division I women's basketball season. The Panthers, led by fourth-year head coach Jesyka Burks-Wiley, played their home games at the Ocean Bank Convocation Center in Miami, Florida as members of Conference USA.

== Previous season ==
The Panthers finished the 2023–24 season 21–12, 11–5 in C-USA play, to finish in a tie for second place. They were upset by New Mexico State in the quarterfinals of the C-USA tournament. They received an at-large bid to the WNIT, where they would defeat Stetson in the first round, before falling to Troy in the second round.

== Roster ==
2024–25 FIU Panthers women's basketball team
Players
Coaches

| Pos. | # | Name | Height | Year | Previous school | Hometown |
|---|---|---|---|---|---|---|
| G | 0 | Angena Belloso | 5 ft 11 in (1.8 m) | Jr | St. Francis Brooklyn | Montgat, Spain |
| G | 1 | Judit Valero | 5 ft 11 in (1.8 m) | So | South Florida | Sant Feliu de Llobregat, Spain |
| PG | 3 | Tanajah Hayes | 5 ft 6 in (1.68 m) | Sr | Zebulon B. Vance High School | Charlotte, North Carolina |
| F | 5 | Lauren Stewart | 6 ft 1 in (1.85 m) | So | Mainland High School | Flagler Beach, Florida |
| G | 10 | Parris Atkins | 5 ft 8 in (1.73 m) | Jr | Dodge City Community College | Little Rock, Arkansas |
| G | 13 | Aaliyah Pitts | 6 ft 0 in (1.83 m) | Sr | Western Kentucky | Suitland, Maryland |
| G | 14 | Ndate Ndiaye | 5 ft 10 in (1.78 m) | Fr | Greenforest Christian Academy | Thiès, Senegal |
| G | 15 | Fantasia James | 5 ft 9 in (1.75 m) | RS Fr | Oakleaf High School | Orange Park, Florida |
| F | 21 | Bineta Diatta | 6 ft 1 in (1.85 m) | Sr | Fresno State | Dakar, Senegal |
| F | 23 | Mya Kone | 6 ft 2 in (1.88 m) | Jr | James Madison | Pompano Beach, Florida |
| F | 24 | Isnelle Natabou | 6 ft 4 in (1.93 m) | Sr | Iowa State | Varnsdorf, Czech Republic |
| G | 30 | Lucia Fleta Robles | 5 ft 7 in (1.7 m) | Sr | Detroit Mercy | San Cristóbal de La Laguna, Spain |
| F | 44 | Claudia Marina | 5 ft 11 in (1.8 m) | Fr | IES Alfredo Kraus | Madrid, Spain |

Head coach

- Jesyka Burks-Wiley (Boston University)

Assistant coach(es)

- Christelle N'Garsanet (Missouri)
- Dan Wendt (West Valley)
- Heather Karner (Youngstown State)

Legend

- (C) Team captain
- (S) Suspended
- (I) Ineligible
- (W) Walk-on
- Injured
- Current redshirt

Roster
Last update: February 2, 2025

== Schedule and results ==
| Date time, TV | Rank^{#} | Opponent^{#} | Result | Record | High points | High rebounds | High assists | Site (attendance) city, state |
Non-conference regular season
| November 4, 2024*; 7:00 pm, ESPN+ | | Florida National | W 132–25 | 1–0 | 21 – Kone | 14 – Kone | 7 – Belloso | Ocean Bank Convocation Center (727); Miami, FL |
| November 8, 2024*; 7:00 pm, ESPN+ | | Abilene Christian; C-USA/WAC Alliance | L 73–76 | 1–1 | 18 – Atkins | 12 – Pitts | 5 – Hayes | Ocean Bank Convocation Center (501); Miami, FL |
| November 13, 2024*; 7:00 pm, ESPN+ | | Jacksonville | L 54–72 | 1–2 | 13 – Atkins | 6 – Natabou | 3 – tied | Ocean Bank Convocation Center (511); Miami, FL |
| November 19, 2024*; 7:00 pm, ACCNX | | at Miami (FL) | L 51–79 | 1–3 | 12 – Atkins | 7 – tied | 2 – Atkins | Watsco Center (2,270); Coral Gables, FL |
| November 23, 2024*; 1:00 pm, ESPN+ | | Florida Atlantic | L 52–62 | 1–4 | 17 – Atkins | 7 – Diatta | 3 – tied | Ocean Bank Convocation Center (590); Miami, FL |
| November 29, 2024*; 12:00 pm, ESPN+ | | Wagner; FIU Thanksgiving Classic | W 87–52 | 2–4 | 21 – Natabou | 9 – tied | 6 – tied | Ocean Bank Convocation Center; Miami, FL |
| December 1, 2024*; 1:00 pm, ESPN+ | | Abilene Christian; FIU Thanksgiving Classic | L 67–87 | 2–5 | 19 – Belloso | 7 – Belloso | 5 – Atkins | Ocean Bank Convocation Center (467); Miami, FL |
| December 7, 2024*; 1:00 pm, ESPN+ | | Yale | W 82–60 | 3–5 | 17 – tied | 7 – Natabou | 3 – tied | Ocean Bank Convocation Center (494); Miami, FL |
| December 16, 2024*; 5:00 pm, ESPN+ | | at UT Arlington; C-USA/WAC Alliance | L 56–72 | 3–6 | 22 – Natabou | 8 – Pitts | 7 – Belloso | College Park Center (734); Arlington, TX |
| December 20, 2024*; 12:00 pm, ESPN+ | | Hampton; FIU Christmas Classic | W 70–60 | 4–6 | 21 – Atkins | 7 – Belloso | 5 – Belloso | Ocean Bank Convocation Center (517); Miami, FL |
| December 21, 2024*; 12:00 pm, ESPN+ | | Miami (OH); FIU Christmas Classic | L 55–62 | 4–7 | 13 – Diatta | 6 – Diatta | 2 – tied | Ocean Bank Convocation Center (538); Miami, FL |
C-USA regular season
| January 2, 2025; 7:30 pm, ESPN+ | | at Middle Tennessee | L 38–69 | 4–8 (0–1) | 8 – tied | 7 – tied | 2 – Belloso | Murphy Center (3,209); Murfreesboro, TN |
| January 4, 2025; 3:00 pm, ESPN+ | | at Western Kentucky | W 80–79 | 5–8 (1–1) | 23 – tied | 12 – Pitts | 8 – Belloso | E. A. Diddle Arena (813); Bowling Green, KY |
| January 9, 2025; 7:00 pm, ESPN+ | | Louisiana Tech | W 72–61 | 6–8 (2–1) | 22 – Natabou | 10 – Natabou | 4 – tied | Ocean Bank Convocation Center (611); Miami, FL |
| January 11, 2025; 1:00 pm, ESPN+ | | Sam Houston | W 61–54 | 7–8 (3–1) | 14 – tied | 9 – Natabou | 4 – Fleta Robles | Ocean Bank Convocation Center (680); Miami, FL |
| January 16, 2025; 8:00 pm, ESPN+ | | at New Mexico State | L 50–74 | 7–9 (3–2) | 17 – Natabou | 11 – Natabou | 3 – Fleta Robles | Pan American Center (482); Las Cruces, NM |
| January 18, 2025; 2:30 pm, ESPN+ | | at UTEP | L 68–70 | 7–10 (3–3) | 21 – Atkins | 9 – Diatta | 8 – Fleta Robles | Don Haskins Center (1,537); El Paso, TX |
| January 25, 2025; 1:00 pm, ESPN+ | | at Liberty | L 54–83 | 7–11 (3–4) | 20 – Natabou | 5 – Natabou | 7 – Fleta Robles | Liberty Arena (1,546); Lynchburg, VA |
| January 30, 2025; 7:00 pm, ESPN+ | | Jacksonville State | W 62–52 | 8–11 (4–4) | 17 – Pitts | 10 – Natabou | 5 – Fleta Robles | Ocean Bank Convocation Center (647); Miami, FL |
| February 1, 2025; 1:00 pm, ESPN+ | | Kennesaw State | W 65–64 | 9–11 (5–4) | 24 – Natabou | 7 – tied | 6 – Fleta Robles | Ocean Bank Convocation Center (534); Miami, FL |
| February 6, 2025; 7:30 pm, ESPN+ | | at Sam Houston | L 54−66 | 9−12 (5−5) | 16 – tied | 10 – Natabou | 2 – Fleta Robles | Bernard Johnson Coliseum (510); Huntsville, TX |
| February 8, 2025; 2:00 pm, ESPN+ | | at Louisiana Tech | L 59−69 | 9−13 (5−6) | 26 – Natabou | 9 – Natabou | 7 – Fleta Robles | Thomas Assembly Center (1,202); Ruston, LA |
| February 13, 2025; 11:00 am, ESPN+ | | UTEP | W 83−66 | 10−13 (6−6) | 20 – Fleta Robles | 9 – James | 5 – Pitts | Ocean Bank Convocation Center (2,147); Miami, FL |
| February 15, 2025; 1:00 pm, ESPN+ | | New Mexico State | L 55−65 | 10−14 (6−7) | 23 – Natabou | 11 – Natabou | 4 – Pitts | Ocean Bank Convocation Center (608); Miami, FL |
| February 22, 2025; 1:00 pm, ESPN+ | | Liberty | L 57−73 | 10−15 (6−8) | 15 – Atkins | 10 – Pitts | 3 – Natabou | Ocean Bank Convocation Center (512); Miami, FL |
| February 27, 2025; 7:00 pm, ESPN+ | | at Kennesaw State | L 50−53 | 10−16 (6−9) | 15 – Natabou | 9 – Natabou | 5 – Belloso | KSU Convocation Center (590); Kennesaw, GA |
| March 1, 2025; 2:30 pm, ESPN+ | | at Jacksonville State | W 74−72 | 11−16 (7−9) | 24 – Natabou | 7 – Natabou | 6 – Fleta Robles | Pete Mathews Coliseum (655); Jacksonville, AL |
| March 6, 2025; 7:00 pm, ESPN+ | | Western Kentucky | L 48−83 | 11−17 (7−10) | 12 – Valero Rodriguez | 4 – tied | 4 – Belloso | Ocean Bank Convocation Center (601); Miami, FL |
| March 8, 2025; 1:00 pm, ESPN+ | | Middle Tennessee | L 44−65 | 11−18 (7−11) | 16 – Natabou | 7 – Natabou | 3 – Pitts | Ocean Bank Convocation Center (723); Miami, FL |
C-USA tournament
| March 13, 2025; 2:00 p.m., ESPN+/CBSSN | (6) | vs. (3) Western Kentucky; Quarterfinal | L 66−73 | 11−19 | 23 – Natabou | 9 – Natabou | 7 – Pitts | Propst Arena (1,975); Huntsville, AL |
*Non-conference game. ^{#}Rankings from AP poll. (#) Tournament seedings in parentheses. All times are in Eastern.
