= 2024–25 Kansas State Wildcats women's basketball team =

Collegiate basketball team season

2024–25 Kansas State Wildcats women's basketball

NCAA tournament, Sweet Sixteen
- Conference: Big 12 Conference

Ranking
- Coaches: No. 18
- AP: No. 19
- Record: 28–8 (13–5 Big 12)
- Head coach: Jeff Mittie (11th season)
- Assistant coaches: Ebony Gilliam; Ebony Haliburton; Staci Gregorio Foss
- Home arena: Bramlage Coliseum

2024–25 Big 12 Conference women's basketball standings
	Conf.				Overall
Team	W		L	PCT	W		L	PCT
No. 6 TCU †	16	–	2	.889	34	–	4	.895
No. 14 Baylor	15	–	3	.833	28	–	8	.778
No. 17 Oklahoma State	14	–	4	.778	25	–	7	.781
No. 16 West Virginia	13	–	5	.722	25	–	8	.758
No. 19 Kansas State	13	–	5	.722	28	–	8	.778
Utah	13	–	5	.722	22	–	9	.710
Iowa State	12	–	6	.667	23	–	12	.657
Arizona	10	–	8	.556	19	–	14	.576
Colorado	9	–	9	.500	21	–	13	.618
Cincinnati	7	–	11	.389	15	–	14	.517
Kansas	6	–	12	.333	16	–	14	.533
BYU	4	–	14	.222	13	–	17	.433
UCF	4	–	14	.222	12	–	18	.400
Texas Tech	4	–	14	.222	19	–	18	.514
Arizona State	3	–	15	.167	10	–	22	.313
Houston	1	–	17	.056	5	–	25	.167
† 2025 Big 12 tournament winner Rankings from AP poll

The 2024–25 Kansas State Wildcats women's basketball team represent Kansas State University in the 2024–25 NCAA Division I women's basketball season. The Wildcats were led by 11th-year head coach Jeff Mittie. They played their home games at Bramlage Coliseum in Manhattan, Kansas, as members of the Big 12 Conference.

== Previous season ==
K-State finished the season 26–8, 13–5 in Big 12 and finished third in the conference. The Wildcats began the season with a school-record 20–1 start, seeing them match their best ranking in school history reaching #2 in both the AP and Coaches Poll on January 29, 2024. However, they stumbled a bit down the stretch and lost back-to-back games to Oklahoma and Texas on the road. They would rebound with a 1-point home win over Oklahoma State before suffering another road loss to Iowa State in double overtime despite Ayoka Lee returning from injury. They had back-to-back home wins over UCF and West Virginia before suffering two more frustrating losses to Kansas on the road and Iowa State at home on Senior Night. They blew out Texas Tech on the road to close out the regular season with a record of 13–5 in Big 12 play and an overall record of 24–6.

As the third seed in the Big 12 tournament, they defeated sixth-seeded West Virginia 65–62 in the quarterfinals, before falling 71–64 to second-seeded Texas in the semifinals. The Wildcats earned an at-large bid to the NCAA Tournament, where they earned a four seed and hosted the first two rounds of the tournament at Bramlage Coliseum for the first time since 2016. In the first round, K-State defeated 13-seed Portland 78–65 before ending their season with a second-round defeat to fifth-seeded Colorado by a 63–50 margin.

== Offseason ==
=== Departures ===
Name	Number	Pos.	Height	Year	Hometown	Reason for Departure
Ja'Mia Harris	2	G	5'11"	(redshirt) Freshman	Lancaster, TX	Transferred to Texas State
Gabby Gregory	12	G	6'0"	GS Senior	Tulsa, OK	Graduated
Rebekah Dallinger	14	G	5'10"	Senior	Sydney, Australia	Graduated
Heavenly Greer	15	F	6'2"	(redshirt) Junior	Phoenix, AZ	Transferred to Arizona State

=== Incoming ===
Name	Num	Pos.	Height	Year	Hometown	Previous School
Temira Poindexter	2	G	6'2"	Senior	Sapulpa, OK	Tulsa
Kennedy Taylor	12	F	6'2"	Senior	Shawnee Mission, KS	Colorado

=== Recruiting Classes ===
Class of 2024

College recruiting information
Name	Hometown	School	Height	Weight	Commit date
Finley Ohnstad; G	Elko New Market, Minnesota	Lakeville South High School	6 ft 1 in (1.85 m)	N/A	Oct 20, 2022
Finley Ohnstad; G	Recruit ratings: No ratings found				
Overall recruit ranking: Scout: Not Ranked Top 20 Rivals: Not Ranked Top 25
Note: In many cases, Scout, Rivals, 247Sports, On3, and ESPN may conflict in their listings of height and weight.; In these cases, the average was taken. ESPN grades are on a 100-point scale.; Sources: "2024 Team Ranking". Rivals.com.

== Roster ==
2024–25 Kansas State Wildcats women's basketball team
Players
Coaches

Pos.	#	Name	Height	Year	Previous school	Hometown
G	1	Zyanna Walker	5 ft 8 in (1.73 m)	RS So	Wichita Heights High School; Louisville	Wichita, KS
G	2	Temira Poindexter	6 ft 2 in (1.88 m)	Sr	Sapulpa High School; Louisville	Sapulpa, OK
G	3	Jaelyn Glenn	6 ft 1 in (1.85 m)	Sr	The Barstow School	Kansas City, MO
G	4	Serena Sundell	6 ft 2 in (1.88 m)	Sr	Maryville	Maryville, MO
G	5	Brylee Glenn (redshirt)	5 ft 11 in (1.8 m)	Sr	The Barstow School	Kansas City, MO
G	10	Mikayla Parks (redshirt)	5 ft 10 in (1.78 m)	So	Norman High School	Norman, OK
G	11	Taryn Sides	5 ft 7 in (1.7 m)	So	Phillipsburg High School	Phillipsburg, KS
F	12	Kennedy Taylor	6 ft 2 in (1.88 m)	Sr	Shawnee Mission Northwest; Missouri State; Colorado	Shawnee Mission, KS
F	21	Eliza Maupin	6 ft 3 in (1.91 m)	Jr	Webster Groves High School	Webster Groves, MO
F	30	Gisela Sanchez	6 ft 4 in (1.93 m)	RS Jr	Segle XXI; Arizona	Barcelona, Spain
F	32	Imani Lester	6 ft 4 in (1.93 m)	RS So	North Raleigh Christian Academy; Louisville	Raleigh, NC
G	33	Finley Ohnstad	6 ft 1 in (1.85 m)	Fr	Lakeville South High School	Elko New Market, MN
F	35	Alexis Hess	6 ft 1 in (1.85 m)	RS Fr	Fleetwood Area High School	Blandon, PA
C	50	Ayoka Lee	6 ft 6 in (1.98 m)	GS	Byron	Byron, MN

Head coach

- Jeff Mittie (Missouri Western)

Assistant coach(es)

- Ebony Gilliam (TCU)
- Ebony Haliburton (Oral Roberts)
- Staci Gregorio Foss (San Diego Mesa)

Legend

- (C) Team captain
- (S) Suspended
- (I) Ineligible
- (W) Walk-on
- Injured
- Current redshirt

Roster

== Schedule and results ==
Date time, TV	Rank^{#}	Opponent^{#}	Result	Record	Site (attendance) city, state
Exhibition
October 30, 2024*; 6:30 pm, ESPN+		Washburn	W 89–36	–	Bramlage Coliseum (3,433); Manhattan, KS
Non-conference regular season
November 4, 2024*; 11:00 am, ESPN+	No. 13	Green Bay	W 92–45	1–0	Bramlage Coliseum (4,408); Manhattan, KS
November 7, 2024*; 6:30 pm, ESPN+	No. 13	Belmont	W 82–56	2–0	Bramlage Coliseum (3,452); Manhattan, KS
November 14, 2024*; 7:30 pm, ESPN2	No. 10	Creighton	W 86–68	3–0	Bramlage Coliseum (5,436); Manhattan, KS
November 18, 2024*; 4:00 pm, ESPN+	No. 10	Little Rock	W 73–43	4–0	Bramlage Coliseum (3,437); Manhattan, KS
November 20, 2024*; 6:30 pm, ESPN+	No. 10	Milwaukee	W 111–46	5–0	Bramlage Coliseum (3,438); Manhattan, KS
November 25, 2024*; 2:00 pm, FloCollege	No. 9	vs. No. 13 Duke; Ball Dawgs Classic Semifinals	L 62–73	5–1	Lee's Family Forum; Henderson, NV
November 27, 2024*; 1:00 pm, FloCollege	No. 9	vs. DePaul; Ball Dawgs Classic 3rd place game	W 92–66	6–1	Lee's Family Forum; Henderson, NV
December 1, 2024*; 3:30 pm, ESPN+	No. 9	Central Arkansas	W 86–39	7–1	Bramlage Coliseum (4,057); Manhattan, KS
December 3, 2024*; 6:30 pm, ESPN+	No. 13	Eastern Illinois	W 90–43	8–1	Bramlage Coliseum (3,407); Manhattan, KS
December 5, 2024*; 6:30 pm, ESPN+	No. 13	USC Upstate	W 110–24	9–1	Bramlage Coliseum (3,386); Manhattan, KS
December 8, 2024*; 3:00 pm, SECN	No. 13	at Texas A&M	W 89–50	10–1	Reed Arena (3,617); College Station, TX
December 14, 2024*; 5:00 pm, ESPN+	No. 13	vs. Middle Tennessee; Bill Snyder Classic	W 74–48	11–1	Civic Arena (2,115); St. Joseph, MO
December 18, 2024*; 6:30 pm, ESPN+	No. 13	New Mexico State	W 83–39	12–1	Bramlage Coliseum (3,547); Manhattan, KS
Conference regular season
December 22, 2024; 1:00 pm, ESPN+	No. 13	Cincinnati	W 76–57	13–1 (1–0)	Bramlage Coliseum (7,700); Manhattan, KS
January 1, 2025; 6:30 pm, ESPN+	No. 12	at Houston	W 74–55	14–1 (2–0)	Fertitta Center (739); Houston, TX
January 4, 2025; 1:00 pm, ESPN+	No. 12	Texas Tech	W 77–57	15–1 (3–0)	Bramlage Coliseum (6,042); Manhattan, KS
January 8, 2025; 8:00 pm, ESPN+	No. 12	at No. 22 Utah	W 71–47	16–1 (4–0)	Jon M. Huntsman Center (4,746); Salt Lake City, UT
January 11, 2025; 5:00 pm, ESPN+	No. 12	at BYU	W 92–65	17–1 (5–0)	Marriott Center (2,517); Provo, UT
January 16, 2025; 6:30 pm, ESPN+	No. 11	Arizona	W 62–47	18–1 (6–0)	Bramlage Coliseum (4,356); Manhattan, KS
January 19, 2025; 1:00 pm, ESPN+	No. 11	Arizona State	W 81–69	19–1 (7–0)	Bramlage Coliseum (6,879); Manhattan, KS
January 25, 2025; 2:00 pm, ESPN+	No. 10	at Colorado	L 53–63	19–2 (7–1)	CU Events Center (4,407); Boulder, CO
January 30, 2025; 7:30 pm, ESPN	No. 11	Iowa State	W 87–79 ^{OT}	20–2 (8–1)	Bramlage Coliseum (5,497); Manhattan, KS
February 2, 2025; 2:00 pm, ESPN+	No. 11	at Kansas; Sunflower Showdown	W 91–64	21–2 (9–1)	Allen Fieldhouse (8,180); Lawrence, KS
February 5, 2025; 6:30 pm, ESPN+	No. 12	No. 9 TCU	W 59–50	22–2 (10–1)	Bramlage Coliseum (7,477); Manhattan, KS
February 8, 2025; 2:00 pm, ESPN+	No. 12	at No. 25 Oklahoma State	L 55–85	22–3 (10–2)	Gallagher-Iba Arena (5,178); Stillwater, OK
February 12, 2025; 5:30 pm, ESPN+	No. 14	at Cincinnati	W 90–53	23–3 (11–2)	Fifth Third Arena (1,126); Cincinnati, OH
February 15, 2025; 4:00 pm, ESPN+	No. 14	UCF	W 97–67	24–3 (12–2)	Bramlage Coliseum (6,246); Manhattan, KS
February 17, 2025; 1:00 pm, FOX	No. 12	at No. 17 West Virginia	L 57–70	24–4 (12–3)	WVU Coliseum (4,122); Morgantown, WV
February 22, 2025; 4:00 pm, ESPN+	No. 12	Kansas; Sunflower Showdown	W 90–60	25–4 (13–3)	Bramlage Coliseum (11,010); Manhattan, KS
February 24, 2025; 6:00 pm, ESPN2	No. 14	No. 17 Baylor	L 62–79	25–5 (13–4)	Bramlage Coliseum (5,200); Manhattan, KS
March 2, 2025; 3:00 pm, ESPN2	No. 14	at Iowa State	L 63–85	25–6 (13–5)	Hilton Coliseum (10,728); Ames, IA
Big 12 tournament
March 6, 2025; 11:00 a.m., ESPN+	(5) No. 20	vs. (13) UCF; Second Round	W 80–65	26–6	T-Mobile Center; Kansas City, MO
March 7, 2025; 11:00 a.m., ESPNU	(5) No. 20	vs. (4) No. 16 West Virginia; Quarterfinals	L 69–73	26–7	T-Mobile Center; Kansas City, MO
NCAA Tournament
March 21, 2025*; 1:30 p.m., ESPNews	(5 S4) No. 19	vs. (12 S4) Fairfield; First Round	W 85–41	27–7	Memorial Coliseum (6,865); Lexington, KY
March 23, 2025*; 1:00 p.m., ESPN	(5 S4) No. 19	at (4 S4) No. 13 Kentucky; Second Round	W 80–79 ^{OT}	28–7	Memorial Coliseum (4,218); Lexington, KY
March 29, 2025*; 7:00 p.m., ESPN	(5 S4) No. 19	vs. (1 S4) No. 4 USC; Sweet Sixteen	L 61–67	28–8	Spokane Arena; Spokane, WA
*Non-conference game. ^{#}Rankings from AP Poll. (#) Tournament seedings in parentheses. S4=Spokane 4. All times are in Central Time.

== Rankings ==
Ranking movements Legend: ██ Increase in ranking ██ Decrease in ranking т = Tied with team above or below
	Week																				
Poll	Pre	1	2	3	4	5	6	7	8	9	10	11	12	13	14	15	16	17	18	19	Final
AP	13	10	10	9	13	13	13	12	12	12	11	10	11	12	14	12	14	20	19	19	
Coaches	13	11	10	12	12	12	12	11	11	10	10	8	11	10	13т	15	16	19	18	18	
