= 2025 Conference USA women's basketball tournament =

American college basketball tournament

- Classification: Division I
- Season: 2024–25
- Teams: 10
- Site: Propst Arena; Huntsville, Alabama
- Television: ESPN+, CBSSN

2024–25 Conference USA women's basketball standings
	Conf.				Overall
Team	W		L	PCT	W		L	PCT
Liberty †	16	–	2	.889	26	–	6	.813
Middle Tennessee	16	–	2	.889	26	–	8	.765
Western Kentucky	13	–	5	.722	23	–	9	.719
New Mexico State	10	–	8	.556	17	–	15	.531
Louisiana Tech	8	–	10	.444	16	–	15	.516
FIU	7	–	11	.389	11	–	19	.367
Kennesaw State	7	–	11	.389	13	–	18	.419
Sam Houston	5	–	13	.278	13	–	17	.433
Jacksonville State	4	–	14	.222	10	–	20	.333
UTEP	4	–	14	.222	11	–	19	.367
† 2025 CUSA tournament winner As of March 15, 2025

The 2025 Conference USA women's basketball tournament was the postseason women's basketball tournament that completed the 2024–25 season in the Conference USA. The tournament was held at the Von Braun Center in Huntsville, Alabama, from March 11–15, 2025. The winner, Liberty, received the conference's automatic bid to the 2025 NCAA tournament.

== Seeds ==
All of the conference's ten teams will compete in the tournament. The top six teams will receive byes to the quarterfinals. Teams will be seeded by record within the conference, with a tiebreaker system to seed teams with identical conference records.

Seed	School	Conference record	Tiebreaker
1	Liberty	16–2	+1 head-to-head point differential
2	Middle Tennessee	16–2	-1 head-to-head point differential
3	Western Kentucky	13–5	
4	New Mexico State	10–8	
5	Louisiana Tech	8–10	
6	FIU	7–11	1–1 vs. Western Kentucky
7	Kennesaw State	7–11	0–2 vs. Western Kentucky
8	Sam Houston	5–13	
9	Jacksonville State	4–11	1–1 vs. New Mexico State
10	UTEP	4–11	0–2 vs. New Mexico State

== Schedule ==
Game	Time	Matchup	Score	Television	Attendance
First round – March 11, 2025
1	11:30 am	No. 8 Sam Houston vs. No. 9 Jacksonville State	55–53	ESPN+	
2	2:00 pm	No. 7 Kennesaw State vs. No. 10 UTEP	71–63	ESPN+	
Quarterfinals – March 12, 2025
3	11:30 am	No. 1 Liberty vs. No. 8 Sam Houston	78–51	ESPN+	
4	2:00 pm	No. 2 Middle Tennessee vs. No. 7 Kennesaw State	73–46	ESPN+	
Quarterfinals – March 13, 2025
5	11:30 am	No. 4 New Mexico State vs. No. 5 Louisiana Tech	55–60	ESPN+	
6	2:00 pm	No. 3 Western Kentucky vs. No. 6 FIU	73–66	ESPN+	
Semifinals – March 14, 2025
7	5:30 pm	No. 1 Liberty vs. No. 5 Louisiana Tech	80–53	ESPN+	
8	8:00 pm	No. 2 Middle Tennessee vs. No. 3 Western Kentucky	71–63	ESPN+	
Championship – March 15, 2025
9	4:30 pm	No. 1 Liberty vs No. 2 Middle Tennessee	53–48	CBSSN	
*Game times in CDT. ()-Rankings denote tournament seeding.

== Bracket ==
First round Tuesday, March 11
8	Sam Houston	55
9	Jacksonville State	53
7	Kennesaw State	71
10	UTEP	63

Quarterfinals; Wednesday, March 12; Thursday, March 13
1	Liberty	78
8	Sam Houston	51
4	New Mexico State	55
5	Louisiana Tech	60
2	Middle Tennessee	73
7	Kennesaw State	46
3	Western Kentucky	73
6	FIU	66

Semifinals; Friday, March 14
1	Liberty	80
5	Louisiana Tech	53
2	Middle Tennessee	71
3	Western Kentucky	63

Championship; Saturday, March 15
1	Liberty	53
2	Middle Tennessee	48

* – Denotes overtime period

== See also ==
- 2025 Conference USA men's basketball tournament
