= 2024–25 Western Kentucky Lady Toppers basketball team =

American college basketball season

2024–25 Western Kentucky Lady Toppers basketball
- Conference: Conference USA
- Record: 23–9 (13–5 C-USA)
- Head coach: Greg Collins (7th season)
- Associate head coach: Todd Buchanan
- Assistant coaches: Temeka Johnson; Tara Arnold-Johns; David Walls; Whitney Creech
- Home arena: E. A. Diddle Arena

2024–25 Conference USA women's basketball standings
| | Conf. | | | | Overall |
| Team | W | | L | PCT | W | | L | PCT |
|---|---|---|---|---|---|---|---|---|
| Liberty † | 16 | – | 2 | .889 | 26 | – | 7 | .788 |
| Middle Tennessee | 16 | – | 2 | .889 | 26 | – | 9 | .743 |
| Western Kentucky | 13 | – | 5 | .722 | 23 | – | 9 | .719 |
| New Mexico State | 10 | – | 8 | .556 | 18 | – | 16 | .529 |
| Louisiana Tech | 8 | – | 10 | .444 | 18 | – | 16 | .529 |
| FIU | 7 | – | 11 | .389 | 11 | – | 19 | .367 |
| Kennesaw State | 7 | – | 11 | .389 | 13 | – | 18 | .419 |
| Sam Houston | 5 | – | 13 | .278 | 13 | – | 17 | .433 |
| Jacksonville State | 4 | – | 14 | .222 | 10 | – | 20 | .333 |
| UTEP | 4 | – | 14 | .222 | 11 | – | 19 | .367 |
† 2025 CUSA tournament winner

The 2024–25 Western Kentucky Lady Toppers basketball team represented Western Kentucky University during the 2024–25 NCAA Division I women's basketball season. The Lady Toppers, led by seventh-year head coach Greg Collins, played their home games at E. A. Diddle Arena in Bowling Green, Kentucky as members of Conference USA (C-USA).

The Lady Toppers finished the season 23–9, 13–5 in C-USA play, to finish in third place. In the C-USA tournament, they defeated FIU in the quarterfinals before being eliminated in the semifinals by Middle Tennessee.

== Previous season ==
The Lady Toppers finished the 2023–24 season 15–17, 6–10 in C-USA play, to finish in a three-way tie for sixth place. They were defeated by eventual tournament runner-up Liberty in the quarterfinals of the C-USA tournament.

== Roster ==
2024–25 Western Kentucky Lady Toppers women's basketball team
Players
Coaches

| Pos. | # | Name | Height | Year | Previous school | Hometown |
|---|---|---|---|---|---|---|
| G | 0 | Mackenzie Chatfield | 5 ft 9 in (1.75 m) | So | Westlake Girls HS | Auckland, New Zealand |
| G | 1 | Destiny Salary | 6 ft 0 in (1.83 m) | GS | Ole Miss | Jonesboro, AR |
| F | 2 | Torri James | 6 ft 0 in (1.83 m) | Fr | Rossview HS | Clarksville, TN |
| G | 3 | Alexis Mead | 5 ft 4 in (1.63 m) | Sr | Martin Luther King HS | Moreno Valley, CA |
| F | 4 | Caleigh-Rose West | 6 ft 1 in (1.85 m) | Sr | Iowa Western CC | Orlando, FL |
| F | 5 | Mya Pratcher | 6 ft 0 in (1.83 m) | Jr | Jackson State | Memphis, TN |
| F | 6 | Mariama Sow | 6 ft 3 in (1.91 m) | Sr | UTEP | Thiès, Senegal |
| G | 10 | Acacia Hayes | 5 ft 7 in (1.7 m) | Jr | Riverdale HS | Murfreesboro, TN |
| F | 13 | Tatum Boettjer | 6 ft 2 in (1.88 m) | So | Barton CC | Derby, KS |
| G | 15 | Tia Shelling | 5 ft 8 in (1.73 m) | Jr | Odessa College | New Orleans, LA |
| F | 23 | Zsofia Telegdy | 6 ft 3 in (1.91 m) | Jr | Kansas | Budapest, Hungary |
| G | 24 | Yendri Acosta | 5 ft 7 in (1.7 m) | Jr | South Plains College | Santo Domingo, Dominican Republic |
| G | 33 | Josie Gilvin | 6 ft 0 in (1.83 m) | Jr | Sacred Heart Academy | Louisville, KY |
| G | 34 | Salma Khedr | 6 ft 1 in (1.85 m) | Fr | Spire Academy | Giza, Egypt |

Head coach

- Greg Collins (Louisville)

Assistant coach(es)

- Todd Buchanan (Murray State)
- Temeka Johnson (LSU)
- Tara Arnold-Johns (Lindsey Wilson)
- David Walls (Western Kentucky)
- Whitney Creech (Western Kentucky)

Legend

- (C) Team captain
- (S) Suspended
- (I) Ineligible
- (W) Walk-on
- Injured
- Current redshirt

Roster
Last update: January 31, 2025

== Schedule and results ==
| Date time, TV | Rank^{#} | Opponent^{#} | Result | Record | High points | High rebounds | High assists | Site (attendance) city, state |
Exhibition
| October 29, 2024*; 6:00 p.m. | | Lee | W 70–48 | – | 14 – Mead | 7 – Gilvin | 2 – 3 tied | E. A. Diddle Arena (853); Bowling Green, KY |
Non-conference regular season
| November 4, 2024*; 6:00 p.m., ESPN+ | | at Indiana State | W 71–59 | 1–0 | 25 – Telegdy | 6 – Gilvin | 5 – Hayes | Hulman Center (1,113); Terre Haute, IN |
| November 9, 2024*; 4:00 p.m., ESPN+ | | Kentucky State | W 104–49 | 2–0 | 18 – Salary | 6 – 2 tied | 6 – Mead | E. A. Diddle Arena (1,042); Bowling Green, KY |
| November 12, 2024*; 6:00 p.m., ESPN+ | | at Mercer | W 78–54 | 3–0 | 21 – Hayes | 8 – Hayes | 5 – Chatfield | Hawkins Arena (358); Macon, GA |
| November 21, 2024*; 6:00 p.m., ESPN+ | | at Abilene Christian; C-USA/WAC Alliance | W 68–64 | 4–0 | 27 – Gilvin | 14 – Telegdy | 8 – Mead | Moody Coliseum (624); Abilene, TX |
| November 24, 2024*; 1:00 p.m., ESPN+ | | North Dakota | W 74–69 | 5–0 | 21 – Hayes | 7 – Gilvin | 3 – 2 tied | E. A. Diddle Arena (767); Bowling Green, KY |
| November 27, 2024*; 4:00 p.m., ESPN+ | | Tennessee State | W 92–62 | 6–0 | 20 – Chatfield | 11 – Salary | 8 – Chatfield | E. A. Diddle Arena (721); Bowling Green, KY |
| December 1, 2024*; 2:00 p.m., ESPN+ | | Miami (OH) | W 79–60 | 7–0 | 24 – Mead | 6 – Gilvin | 5 – Salary | E. A. Diddle Arena (705); Bowling Green, KY |
| December 8, 2024*; 1:00 p.m., ESPN+ | | at Wichita State | L 59–64 | 7–1 | 22 – Mead | 11 – Salary | 4 – Mead | Charles Koch Arena (1,563); Wichita, KS |
| December 11, 2024*; 6:30 p.m., ESPN+ | | Kentucky Wesleyan | W 88–61 | 8–1 | 19 – Mead | 9 – Gilvin | 5 – 2 tied | E. A. Diddle Arena (711); Bowling Green, KY |
| December 19, 2024*; 9:00 p.m., YouTube | | vs. Oregon State; Maui Classic | L 58–80 | 8–2 | 21 – Salary | 6 – Telegdy | 3 – Mead | Seabury Hall; Makawao, HI |
| December 20, 2024*; 7:30 p.m., YouTube | | vs. Nevada; Maui Classic | W 80–70 | 9–2 | 20 – Salary | 4 – 2 tied | 5 – Mead | Seabury Hall; Makawao, HI |
| December 28, 2024*; 3:00 p.m., SECN+ | | at No. 16 Kentucky | L 70–88 | 9–3 | 18 – Mead | 4 – 2 tied | 4 – Mead | Memorial Coliseum (5,700); Lexington, KY |
C-USA regular season
| January 2, 2025; 6:30 p.m., ESPN+ | | Liberty | L 66–77 | 9–4 (0–1) | 19 – Salary | 8 – Gilvin | 6 – Mead | E. A. Diddle Arena (788); Bowling Green, KY |
| January 4, 2025; 2:00 p.m., ESPN+ | | FIU | L 79–80 | 9–5 (0–2) | 21 – Salary | 5 – 2 tied | 9 – Gilvin | E. A. Diddle Arena (813); Bowling Green, KY |
| January 9, 2025; 6:30 p.m., ESPN+ | | at Jacksonville State | W 51–44 | 10–5 (1–2) | 13 – Telegdy | 9 – Gilvin | 3 – 2 tied | Pete Mathews Coliseum (655); Jacksonville, AL |
| January 11, 2025; 12:00 p.m., ESPN+ | | at Kennesaw State | W 72–62 | 11–5 (2–2) | 16 – Salary | 12 – Telegdy | 6 – Salary | KSU Convocation Center; Kennesaw, GA |
| January 18, 2025; 2:00 p.m., ESPN+ | | Middle Tennessee | W 63–58 | 12–5 (3–2) | 17 – Gilvin | 6 – Gilvin | 3 – 2 tied | E. A. Diddle Arena (1,499); Bowling Green, KY |
| January 23, 2025; 11:00 a.m., ESPN+ | | Louisiana Tech | W 69–61 | 13–5 (4–2) | 17 – Salary | 6 – 2 tied | 5 – 2 tied | E. A. Diddle Arena (4,313); Bowling Green, KY |
| January 25, 2025; 2:00 p.m., ESPN+ | | Sam Houston | W 82–49 | 14–5 (5–2) | 13 – Chatfield | 8 – Gilvin | 10 – Chatfield | E. A. Diddle Arena (958); Bowling Green, KY |
| January 30, 2025; 8:00 p.m., ESPN+ | | at UTEP | W 65–59 | 15–5 (6–2) | 15 – 2 tied | 7 – 2 tied | 4 – Hayes | Don Haskins Center (1,085); El Paso, TX |
| February 1, 2025; 3:00 p.m., ESPN+ | | at New Mexico State | L 59–64 | 15–6 (6–3) | 14 – Hayes | 7 – Mead | 4 – 2 tied | Pan American Center (397); Las Cruces, NM |
| February 6, 2025; 6:30 p.m., ESPN+ | | Kennesaw State | W 78–57 | 16–6 (7–3) | 28 – Gilvin | 7 – Mead | 7 – Mead | E. A. Diddle Arena (804); Bowling Green, KY |
| February 8, 2025; 2:00 p.m., ESPN+ | | Jacksonville State | W 68-64 | 17–6 (8–3) | 29 – Mead | 9 – Mead | 5 – Telegdy | E. A. Diddle Arena (1,113); Bowling Green, KY |
| February 15, 2025; 2:00 p.m., ESPN+ | | at Middle Tennessee | L 63–73 | 17–7 (8–4) | 20 – Telegdy | 10 – Gilvin | 4 – 2 tied | Murphy Center (4,433); Murfreesboro, TN |
| February 20, 2025; 6:30 p.m., ESPN+ | | at Sam Houston | W 57–45 | 18–7 (9–4) | 23 – Gilvin | 11 – Gilvin | 5 – 2 tied | Bernard Johnson Coliseum (423); Huntsville, TX |
| February 22, 2025; 3:00 p.m., ESPN+ | | at Louisiana Tech | W 78–73 | 19–7 (10–4) | 19 – Gilvin | 10 – Gilvin | 4 – Mead | Thomas Assembly Center (1,144); Ruston, LA |
| February 27, 2025; 6:30 p.m., ESPN+ | | UTEP | W 81–58 | 20–7 (11–4) | 21 – Gilvin | 11 – 2 tied | 4 – Salary | E. A. Diddle Arena (855); Bowling Green, KY |
| March 1, 2025; 2:00 p.m., ESPN+ | | New Mexico State | W 85–68 | 21–7 (12–4) | 23 – Mead | 7 – Salary | 8 – Mead | E. A. Diddle Arena (1,101); Bowling Green, KY |
| March 6, 2025; 6:00 p.m., ESPN+ | | at FIU | W 83–48 | 22–7 (13–4) | 26 – Salary | 7 – Gilvin | 7 – Mead | Ocean Bank Convocation Center (601); Miami, FL |
| March 8, 2025; 1:00 p.m., ESPN+ | | at Liberty | L 70–74 | 22–8 (13–5) | 31 – Gilvin | 6 – Gilvin | 5 – 2 tied | Liberty Arena (1,274); Lynchburg, VA |
C-USA tournament
| March 13, 2025; 2:00 p.m., ESPN+ | (3) | vs. (6) FIU; Quarterfinals | W 73–66 | 23–8 | 21 – Mead | 10 – Gilvin | 9 – Mead | Propst Arena (1,975); Huntsville, AL |
| March 14, 2025; 9:00 p.m., ESPN+ | (3) | vs. (2) Middle Tennessee; Semifinals | L 63–71 | 23–9 | 19 – Mead | 14 – Gilvin | 4 – 2 tied | Propst Arena (2,615); Huntsville, AL |
*Non-conference game. ^{#}Rankings from AP poll. (#) Tournament seedings in parentheses. All times are in Central.
