= 2024–25 UTEP Miners women's basketball team =

American college basketball season

2024–25 UTEP Miners women's basketball
- Conference: Conference USA
- Record: 11–19 (4–14 C-USA)
- Head coach: Keitha Adams (2nd, 18th overall season)
- Associate head coach: Ewa Laskowska
- Assistant coaches: Jareica Hughes; Lulu McKinney
- Home arena: Don Haskins Center

2024–25 Conference USA women's basketball standings
	Conf.				Overall
Team	W		L	PCT	W		L	PCT
Liberty †	16	–	2	.889	26	–	7	.788
Middle Tennessee	16	–	2	.889	26	–	9	.743
Western Kentucky	13	–	5	.722	23	–	9	.719
New Mexico State	10	–	8	.556	18	–	16	.529
Louisiana Tech	8	–	10	.444	18	–	16	.529
FIU	7	–	11	.389	11	–	19	.367
Kennesaw State	7	–	11	.389	13	–	18	.419
Sam Houston	5	–	13	.278	13	–	17	.433
Jacksonville State	4	–	14	.222	10	–	20	.333
UTEP	4	–	14	.222	11	–	19	.367
† 2025 CUSA tournament winner

The 2024–25 UTEP Miners women's basketball team represented the University of Texas at El Paso during the 2024–25 NCAA Division I women's basketball season. The Miners, led by Keitha Adams in the second season of her second stint as head coach, and 18th season overall, played their home games at the Don Haskins Center in El Paso, Texas, as members of Conference USA.

== Previous season ==
The Miners finished the 2023–24 season 12–19, 6–10 in C-USA play, to finish in a three-way tie for sixth place. They defeated Sam Houston, before falling to top-seeded and eventual tournament champions Middle Tennessee in the quarterfinals of the C-USA tournament.

== Roster ==
2024–25 UTEP Miners women's basketball team
Players
Coaches

Pos.	#	Name	Height	Year	Hometown
G	1	Aaliyah Davis	5 ft 7 in (1.7 m)	RS Jr	El Paso, Texas
G	2	Heaven Samayoa-Mathis	5 ft 7 in (1.7 m)	Jr	Sacramento, California
G	3	Ivane Tensaie	5 ft 7 in (1.7 m)	Sr	Roseville, Minnesota
G	5	Delma Zita	5 ft 8 in (1.73 m)	Sr	Maputo, Mozambique
F	8	Dunja Zecevic	6 ft 1 in (1.85 m)	So	Belgrade, Serbia
G	10	Yagmur Canguven	5 ft 11 in (1.8 m)	Fr	Mersin, Turkey
G	11	Portia Adams	5 ft 6 in (1.68 m)	Jr	Cedar Hill, Texas
G	12	Irene Asensio	5 ft 8 in (1.73 m)	Fr	Barcelona, Spain
F	13	Ndack Mbengue	6 ft 3 in (1.91 m)	Jr	Bergamo, Italy
G	15	Abby Priscilla	5 ft 11 in (1.8 m)	Jr	Kampala, Uganda
G	20	Thelma Barbitch	5 ft 10 in (1.78 m)	RS Fr	Paris, France
F	22	Mary Moses Amaniyo	6 ft 1 in (1.85 m)	Fr	Arua, Uganda
F	23	Luisa Vydrova	6 ft 1 in (1.85 m)	So	Prague, Czech Republic
F	25	Osadebamwen Igbinedion Omoruyi	6 ft 4 in (1.93 m)	Fr	Madrid, Spain

Head coach

- Keitha Adams (Southwestern College)

Assistant coach(es)

- Ewa Laskowska (Kansas State)
- Jareica Hughes (UTEP)
- Lulu McKinney (UTEP)

Legend

- (C) Team captain
- (S) Suspended
- (I) Ineligible
- (W) Walk-on
- Injured
- Current redshirt

Roster
Last update: February 3, 2025

== Schedule and results ==
Date time, TV	Rank^{#}	Opponent^{#}	Result	Record	High points	High rebounds	High assists	Site (attendance) city, state
Non-conference regular season
November 4, 2024*; 11:00 am, ESPN+		Tarleton State; C-USA/WAC Alliance	W 52–49	1–0	15 – Adams	5 – tied	3 – Zita	Don Haskins Center (2,055); El Paso, TX
November 10, 2024*; 6:00 pm, ESPN+		Morehead State	W 68–41	2–0	18 – Vydrova	8 – Moses Amaniyo	3 – tied	Don Haskins Center (1,617); El Paso, TX
November 16, 2024*; 11:00 am		UTSA	L 73–78	2–1	27 – Tensaie	5 – tied	7 – Zita	Don Haskins Center (1,041); El Paso, TX
November 23, 2024*; 2:00 pm, ESPN+		New Mexico Highlands	W 83–54	3–1	14 – Tensaie	8 – Mbengue	5 – Adams	Don Haskins Center (1,083); El Paso, TX
November 26, 2024*; 3:00 pm, ESPN+		at Texas A&M–Corpus Christi	W 64–53	4–1	18 – Vydrova	12 – Vydrova	9 – Zita	American Bank Center (915); Corpus Christi, TX
December 5, 2024*; 7:00 pm, ESPN+		BYU	L 68–81	4–2	21 – Tensaie	11 – Mbengue	6 – Zita	Don Haskins Center (1,459); El Paso, TX
December 8, 2024*; 3:00 pm, ESPN+		at Portland	L 67–83	4–3	14 – tied	11 – Mbengue	7 – Zita	Chiles Center (603); Portland, OR
December 14, 2024*; 1:00 pm, ESPN+		at Utah Tech; C-USA/WAC Alliance	W 71–57	5–3	15 – tied	10 – Vydrova	5 – tied	Burns Arena (377); St. George, UT
December 16, 2024*; 6:30 pm, MWN		at Colorado State	L 52–70	5–4	13 – Samayoa-Mathis	14 – Zecevic	4 – Asensio	Moby Arena (1.343); Fort Collins, CO
December 19, 2024*; 2:00 pm, ESPN+		Arkansas–Pine Bluff	W 70–62	6–4	17 – Adams	4 – tied	4 – Adams	Don Haskins Center (1,228); El Paso, TX
December 30, 2024*; 7:00 pm, ESPN+		Eastern New Mexico	W 50–48	7–4	15 – Zita	13 – Moses Amaniyo	4 – Adams	Don Haskins Center (1,207); El Paso, TX
C-USA regular season
January 2, 2025; 5:30 pm, ESPN+		at Louisiana Tech	L 50–63	7–5 (0–1)	12 – tied	12 – Mbengue	6 – Zita	Thomas Assembly Center (1,016); Ruston, LA
January 4, 2025; 1:00 pm, ESPN+		at Sam Houston	W 64–62	8–5 (1–1)	17 – Tensaie	12 – Mbengue	4 – tied	Bernard Johnson Coliseum (117); Huntsville, TX
January 11, 2025; 2:00 pm, ESPN+		at New Mexico State; Battle of I-10	L 49–65	8–6 (1–2)	10 – Adams	9 – Adams	3 – Zita	Pan American Center (896); Las Cruces, NM
January 16, 2025; 7:00 pm, ESPN+		Liberty	L 64–75	8–7 (1–3)	15 – Mbengue	9 – Vydrova	5 – Asensio	Don Haskins Center (1,346); El Paso, TX
January 18, 2025; 12:30 pm, ESPN+		FIU	W 70–68	9–7 (2–3)	20 – Tensaie	10 – Mbengue	4 – tied	Don Haskins Center (1,537); El Paso, TX
January 23, 2025; 5:00 pm, ESPN+		at Jacksonville State	L 71–72 ^{OT}	9–8 (2–4)	23 – Adams	11 – Mbengue	6 – Asensio	Pete Mathews Coliseum (455); Jacksonville, AL
January 25, 2025; 12:00 pm, ESPN+		at Kennesaw State	L 70–84	9–9 (2–5)	19 – Adams	11 – Mbengue	4 – Zita	KSU Convocation Center (688); Kennesaw, GA
January 30, 2025; 7:00 pm, ESPN+		Western Kentucky	L 59–65	9–10 (2–6)	18 – Tensaie	9 – Vydrova	5 – Zita	Don Haskins Center (1,085); El Paso, TX
February 1, 2025; 1:00 pm, ESPN+		Middle Tennessee	L 42–64	9–11 (2–7)	23 – Tensaie	9 – Vydrova	2 – tied	Don Haskins Center (1,565); El Paso, TX
February 8, 2025; 2:00 pm, ESPN+		New Mexico State; Battle of I-10	L 60-85	9-12 (2-8)	16 – Tensaie	11 – Mbengue	2 – tied	Don Haskins Center (1,664); El Paso, TX
February 13, 2025; 9:00 am, ESPN+		at FIU	L 66-83	9-13 (2-9)	17 – Adams	7 – Vydrova	5 – Zita	Ocean Bank Convocation Center (2,147); Miami, FL
February 15, 2025; 12:00 pm, ESPN+		at Liberty	L 53-67	9-14 (2-10)	13 – Barbitch	4 – Mbengue	4 – Asensio	Liberty Arena (1,826); Lynchburg, VA
February 20, 2025; 7:00 pm, ESPN+		Kennesaw State	L 56-68	9-15 (2-11)	12 – Mbengue	12 – Mbengue	4 – Zita	Don Haskins Center (1,284); El Paso, TX
February 22, 2025; 12:30 pm, ESPN+		Jacksonville State	W 52-44	10-15 (3-11)	13 – Tensaie	8 – Vydrova	4 – Adams	Don Haskins Center (1,382); El Paso, TX
February 27, 2025; 5:30 pm, ESPN+		at Western Kentucky	L 58-81	10-16 (3-12)	14 – tied	5 – tied	3 – tied	E. A. Diddle Arena (855); Bowling Green, KY
March 1, 2025; 12:00 pm, ESPN+		at Middle Tennessee	L 35-57	10-17 (3-13)	13 – Mbengue	10 – Mbengue	2 – Zecevic	Murphy Center (3,806); Murfreesboro, TN
March 6, 2025; 7:00 pm, ESPN+		Sam Houston	W 65-64	11-17 (4-13)	22 – Tensaie	5 – Mbengue	5 – Adams	Don Haskins Center (1,284); El Paso, TX
March 8, 2025; 2:00 pm, ESPN+		Louisiana Tech	L 51−69	11−18 (4−14)	17 – Vydrova	10 – Mbengue	6 – Zita	Don Haskins Center (1,337); El Paso, TX
C-USA tournament
March 11, 2025; 2:00 p.m., ESPN+/CBSSN	(10)	vs. (7) Kennesaw State; First Round	L 63−71	11−19	24 – Adams	8 – Mbengue	2 – tied	Propst Arena (780); Huntsville, AL
*Non-conference game. ^{#}Rankings from AP poll. (#) Tournament seedings in parentheses. All times are in Mountain.
