= 2024–25 Sam Houston Bearkats women's basketball team =

American college basketball season

2024–25 Sam Houston Bearkats women's basketball
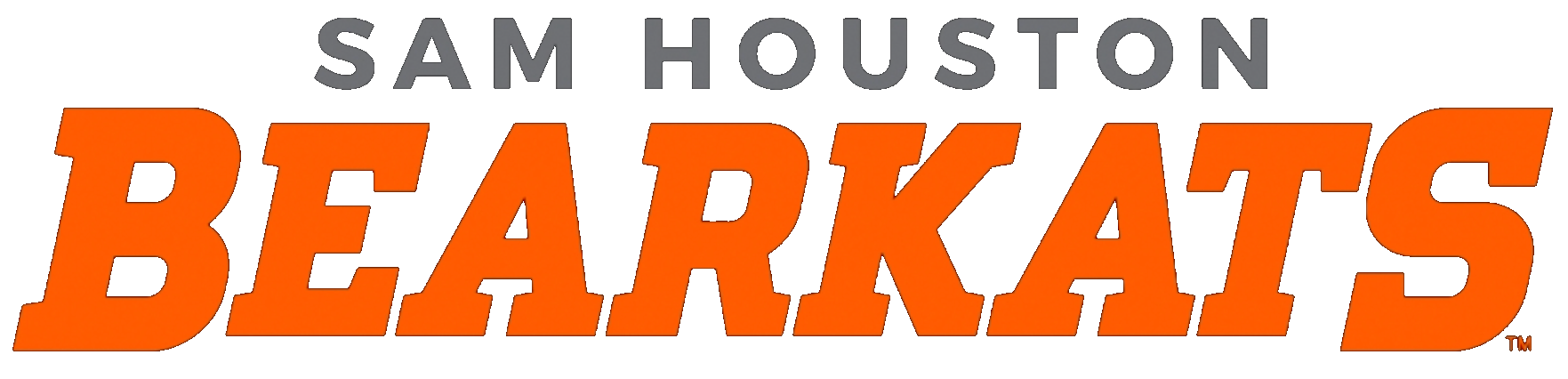
- Conference: Conference USA
- Record: 13–17 (5–13 C-USA)
- Head coach: Ravon Justice (6th season)
- Assistant coaches: Brittany Mason; Martin Pazanin; Ayriell Robinson
- Home arena: Bernard Johnson Coliseum

2024–25 Conference USA women's basketball standings
| | Conf. | | | | Overall |
| Team | W | | L | PCT | W | | L | PCT |
|---|---|---|---|---|---|---|---|---|
| Liberty † | 16 | – | 2 | .889 | 26 | – | 7 | .788 |
| Middle Tennessee | 16 | – | 2 | .889 | 26 | – | 9 | .743 |
| Western Kentucky | 13 | – | 5 | .722 | 23 | – | 9 | .719 |
| New Mexico State | 10 | – | 8 | .556 | 18 | – | 16 | .529 |
| Louisiana Tech | 8 | – | 10 | .444 | 18 | – | 16 | .529 |
| FIU | 7 | – | 11 | .389 | 11 | – | 19 | .367 |
| Kennesaw State | 7 | – | 11 | .389 | 13 | – | 18 | .419 |
| Sam Houston | 5 | – | 13 | .278 | 13 | – | 17 | .433 |
| Jacksonville State | 4 | – | 14 | .222 | 10 | – | 20 | .333 |
| UTEP | 4 | – | 14 | .222 | 11 | – | 19 | .367 |
† 2025 CUSA tournament winner

The 2024–25 Sam Houston Bearkats women's basketball team represented Sam Houston State University during the 2024–25 NCAA Division I women's basketball season. The Bearkats, led by sixth-year head coach Ravon Justice, played their home games at the Bernard Johnson Coliseum in Huntsville, Texas, as second-year members of Conference USA.

== Previous season ==
The Bearkats finished the 2023–24 season 7–22, 2–14 in C-USA play, to finish in last place. They were defeated by UTEP in the first round of the C-USA tournament.

== Roster ==
2024–25 Sam Houston Bearkats women's basketball team
Players
Coaches

| Pos. | # | Name | Height | Year | Previous school | Hometown |
|---|---|---|---|---|---|---|
| G | 0 | Sydnee Kemp | 5 ft 5 in (1.65 m) | RS Sr | Lee's Summit West High School | Kansas City, Missouri |
| G | 1 | Kaila Kelley | 5 ft 8 in (1.73 m) | RS Jr | Trinity Valley Community College | Dallas, Texas |
| G | 3 | Kelis Grant | 5 ft 7 in (1.7 m) | So | Cedar Hill High School | Cedar Hill, Texas |
| G | 4 | Fanta Kone | 5 ft 7 in (1.7 m) | Jr | Tyler Junior College | Bamako, Mali |
| G | 5 | Aysia Ward-Strong | 5 ft 10 in (1.78 m) | Sr | McLennan Community College | Dallas, Texas |
| G | 7 | Annika Corcoran | 5 ft 5 in (1.65 m) | RS Sr | Detroit Mercy | Chardon, Ohio |
| F | 8 | Deborah Ogayemi | 6 ft 0 in (1.83 m) | RS Jr | UT Rio Grande Valley | Waterford, Ireland |
| F | 10 | Kyleigh McGuire | 6 ft 0 in (1.83 m) | GS | UTSA | Houston, Texas |
| G | 11 | Esther Rodellar | 5 ft 10 in (1.78 m) | So | Siena | Barcelona, Spain |
| F | 15 | Nyla Inmon | 6 ft 0 in (1.83 m) | Jr | Kilgore College | Tyler, Texas |
| G | 23 | Bryana Block | 5 ft 6 in (1.68 m) | RS So | Liberty-Eylau High School | Texarkana, Texas |
| G | 24 | Whitney Dunn | 5 ft 9 in (1.75 m) | Jr | Alabama State | Chicago, Illinois |
| C | 25 | Lea Salinas Beamen | 6 ft 4 in (1.93 m) | Fr | Liberty High School | Brentwood, California |

Head coach

- Ravon Justice (USAO)

Assistant coach(es)

- Brittany Mason (Houston)
- Martin Pazanin (Bradley)
- Ayriell Robinson (Saint Louis)

Legend

- (C) Team captain
- (S) Suspended
- (I) Ineligible
- (W) Walk-on
- Injured
- Current redshirt

Roster
Last update: February 3, 2025

== Schedule and results ==
| Date time, TV | Rank^{#} | Opponent^{#} | Result | Record | High points | High rebounds | High assists | Site (attendance) city, state |
Non-conference regular season
| November 6, 2024*; 6:30 pm, ESPN+ | | Jarvis Christian | W 98–47 | 1–0 | 17 – Kelley | 10 – Inmon | 4 – tied | Bernard Johnson Coliseum (467); Huntsville, TX |
| November 9, 2024*; 6:30 pm, ESPN+ | | Seattle; C-USA/WAC Alliance | W 69–57 | 2–0 | 21 – Grant | 9 – Ogayemi | 8 – Kone | Bernard Johnson Coliseum (174); Huntsville, TX |
| November 11, 2024*; 6:30 pm, ESPN+ | | at Kansas | L 51–66 | 2–1 | 15 – Kelley | 10 – Ogayemi | 3 – tied | Allen Fieldhouse (2,907); Lawrence, KS |
| November 17, 2024*; 2:00 pm, ESPN+ | | at Rice | L 60–65 | 2–2 | 16 – Kelley | 11 – Ward-Strong | 5 – Kone | Tudor Fieldhouse (733); Houston, TX |
| November 20, 2024*; 7:00 pm, ESPN+ | | St. Thomas (TX) | W 86–48 | 3–2 | 18 – Kelley | 16 – Ogayemi | 5 – Dunn | Bernard Johnson Coliseum (426); Huntsville, TX |
| November 23, 2024*; 2:00 pm, ESPN+ | | Arkansas–Pine Bluff | W 67–48 | 4–2 | 19 – Ward-Strong | 13 – Ogayemi | 6 – Kone | Bernard Johnson Coliseum (471); Huntsville, TX |
| December 5, 2024*; 11:00 am, ESPN+ | | McMurry | W 75–53 | 5–2 | 19 – Kelley | 14 – Kone | 10 – Kone | Bernard Johnson Coliseum (347); Huntsville, TX |
| December 7, 2024*; 1:00 pm, ESPN+ | | at UTSA | L 36–79 | 5–3 | 16 – Dunn | 10 – Ward-Strong | 3 – Kone | Convocation Center (837); San Antonio, TX |
| December 16, 2024*; 7:30 pm, ESPN+ | | at Southern Utah; C-USA/WAC Alliance | W 72–61 | 6–3 | 17 – Kelley | 8 – Kone | 11 – Kone | America First Event Center (266); Cedar City, UT |
| December 20, 2024*; 1:00 pm, ESPN+ | | at Houston Christian | W 79–68 | 7–3 | 22 – Kelley | 9 – Ward-Strong | 8 – Kone | Sharp Gymnasium (204); Houston, TX |
C-USA regular season
| January 2, 2025; 6:30 pm, ESPN+ | | New Mexico State | L 61–79 | 7–4 (0–1) | 13 – Kemp | 6 – tied | 4 – Kone | Bernard Johnson Coliseum (456); Huntsville, TX |
| January 4, 2025; 2:00 pm, ESPN+ | | UTEP | L 62–64 | 7–5 (0–2) | 19 – Ogayemi | 11 – Kone | 9 – Kone | Bernard Johnson Coliseum (117); Huntsville, TX |
| January 9, 2025; 6:00 pm, ESPN+ | | at Liberty | L 54–69 | 7–6 (0–3) | 14 – tied | 9 – Ogayemi | 4 – Kemp | Liberty Arena (869); Lynchburg, VA |
| January 11, 2025; 12:00 pm, ESPN+ | | at FIU | L 54–61 | 7–7 (0–4) | 13 – Inmon | 9 – Kone | 6 – Kone | Ocean Bank Convocation Center (587); Miami, FL |
| January 16, 2025; 6:30 pm, ESPN+ | | Kennesaw State | L 73–85 ^{OT} | 7–8 (0–5) | 13 – tied | 12 – Ogayemi | 5 – Inmon | Bernard Johnson Coliseum (587); Huntsville, TX |
| January 18, 2025; 2:00 pm, ESPN+ | | Jacksonville State | W 53–48 | 8–8 (1–5) | 13 – Inmon | 7 – Ward-Strong | 5 – Kone | Bernard Johnson Coliseum (507); Huntsville, TX |
| January 23, 2025; 6:30 pm, ESPN+ | | at Middle Tennessee | L 38–66 | 8–9 (1–6) | 14 – Inmon | 10 – Kone | 2 – tied | Murphy Center (2,806); Murfreesboro, TN |
| January 25, 2025; 2:00 pm, ESPN+ | | at Western Kentucky | L 49–82 | 8–10 (1–7) | 15 – Ogayemi | 9 – Ogayemi | 3 – Inmon | E. A. Diddle Arena (958); Bowling Green, KY |
| February 1, 2025; 2:00 pm, ESPN+ | | Louisiana Tech | W 70–65 | 9–10 (2–7) | 19 – Inmon | 10 – Ogayemi | 4 – tied | Bernard Johnson Coliseum (536); Huntsville, TX |
| February 6, 2025; 6:30 pm, ESPN+ | | FIU | W 66−54 | 10−10 (3−7) | 20 – Inmon | 9 – Inmon | 3 – Kone | Bernard Johnson Coliseum (510); Huntsville, TX |
| February 8, 2025; 2:00 pm, ESPN+ | | Liberty | L 54−74 | 10−11 (3−8) | 16 – Kone | 7 – Ogayemi | 3 – tied | Bernard Johnson Coliseum (467); Huntsville, TX |
| February 13, 2025; 6:30 pm, ESPN+ | | at Jacksonville State | W 56−49 | 11−11 (4−8) | 19 – Ogayemi | 10 – Inmon | 7 – Kone | Pete Mathews Coliseum (313); Jacksonville, AL |
| February 15, 2025; 1:00 pm, ESPN+ | | at Kennesaw State | | | | | | KSU Convocation Center; Kennesaw, GA |
| February 20, 2025; 6:30 pm, ESPN+ | | Western Kentucky | | | | | | Bernard Johnson Coliseum; Huntsville, TX |
| February 22, 2025; 12:00 pm, ESPN+ | | Middle Tennessee | | | | | | Bernard Johnson Coliseum; Huntsville, TX |
| February 27, 2025; 6:30 pm, ESPN+ | | at Louisiana Tech | | | | | | Thomas Assembly Center; Ruston, LA |
| March 6, 2025; 8:00 pm, ESPN+ | | at UTEP | W 65−64 | 12−15 (5−12) | 14 – Dunn | 9 – Ogayemi | 6 – Kemp | Don Haskins Center (1,284); El Paso, TX |
| March 8, 2025; 3:00 pm, ESPN+ | | at New Mexico State | L 56−64 | 12−16 (5−13) | 24 – Inmon | 11 – Ogayemi | 3 – tied | Pan American Center (7,432); Las Cruces, NM |
C-USA tournament
| March 11, 2025; 11:30 am, ESPN+/CBSSN | (8) | vs. (9) Jacksonville State; First Round | W 55−53 | 13−16 | 17 – Inmon | 6 – tied | 4 – Kone | Propst Arena (2,056); Huntsville, AL |
| March 12, 2025; 11:30 am, ESPN+/CBSSN | (8) | vs. (1) Liberty; Quarterfinal | L 51−78 | 13−17 | 19 – Dunn | 9 – Ogayemi | 2 – tied | Propst Arena (2,205); Huntsville, AL |
*Non-conference game. ^{#}Rankings from AP poll. (#) Tournament seedings in parentheses. All times are in Central.
