= 2024–25 Middle Tennessee Blue Raiders women's basketball team =

American college basketball season

2024–25 Middle Tennessee Blue Raiders women's basketball

CUSA co-regular season champions

WBIT, First Round
- Conference: Conference USA
- Record: 26–9 (16–2 C-USA)
- Head coach: Rick Insell (20th season)
- Associate head coach: Matt Insell
- Assistant coaches: Kim Brewton; Nina Davis; Tom Hodges; Courtney Whitson
- Home arena: Murphy Center

2024–25 Conference USA women's basketball standings
	Conf.				Overall
Team	W		L	PCT	W		L	PCT
Liberty †	16	–	2	.889	26	–	7	.788
Middle Tennessee	16	–	2	.889	26	–	9	.743
Western Kentucky	13	–	5	.722	23	–	9	.719
New Mexico State	10	–	8	.556	18	–	16	.529
Louisiana Tech	8	–	10	.444	18	–	16	.529
FIU	7	–	11	.389	11	–	19	.367
Kennesaw State	7	–	11	.389	13	–	18	.419
Sam Houston	5	–	13	.278	13	–	17	.433
Jacksonville State	4	–	14	.222	10	–	20	.333
UTEP	4	–	14	.222	11	–	19	.367
† 2025 CUSA tournament winner

The 2024–25 Middle Tennessee Blue Raiders women's basketball team represented Middle Tennessee State University during the 2024–25 NCAA Division I women's basketball season. The Blue Raiders, led by 20th-year head coach Rick Insell, played their home games at Murphy Center in Murfreesboro, Tennessee, as members of Conference USA.

== Previous season ==
The Blue Raiders finished the 2023–24 season 30–5, 16–0 in C-USA play, to finish as C-USA regular season champions. They defeated UTEP, Louisiana Tech, and Liberty to win their second straight C-USA tournament championship, and in turn, their second straight NCAA tournament appearance, claiming the conference's automatic bid to the tournament. They received the #11 seed in the Albany Regional 2, where they upset #6 region seed Louisville in the first round, before falling to #3 region seed LSU in the second round.

== Roster ==
2024–25 Middle Tennessee Blue Raiders women's basketball team
Players
Coaches

Pos.	#	Name	Height	Year	Previous school	Hometown
G	1	Courtney Blakely	5 ft 8 in (1.73 m)	Sr	Arizona	Gary, Indiana
C	2	Anastasiia Boldyreva	6 ft 7 in (2.01 m)	Sr	Twice Named Hero of the Soviet Union	Moscow, Russia
G	3	Gracie Dodgen	5 ft 10 in (1.78 m)	RS Jr	White County High School	Sparta, Tennessee
F	9	Dora Van Rijs	6 ft 0 in (1.83 m)	So	Obudai Arpad Gimnazium	Budapest, Hungary
G	10	Jalynn Gregory	5 ft 8 in (1.73 m)	Sr	Macon County High School	Lafayette, Tennessee
G	11	Emily Monson	6 ft 1 in (1.85 m)	So	Purdue	Murfreesboro, Tennessee
G	12	Gracie Hamby	5 ft 8 in (1.73 m)	RS So	Blackman High School	Murfreesboro, Tennessee
G	14	Savannah Davis	5 ft 10 in (1.78 m)	Fr	McKenzie High School	McKenzie, Tennessee
G	15	Ta'Mia Scott	6 ft 0 in (1.83 m)	Jr	Clarksville Northwest High School	Clarksville, Tennessee
F	21	Elina Arike (5Y)	6 ft 2 in (1.88 m)	Sr	Texas Tech	Helsinki, Finland
F	22	Jada Grannum	6 ft 3 in (1.91 m)	RS Sr	Lincoln Prep	Mississauga, Ontario
G	23	Jada Harrison	5 ft 8 in (1.73 m)	RS Fr	Westview High School	Martin, Tennessee
F	24	Ana Milanovic	6 ft 3 in (1.91 m)	Fr	Serbia U18 national team	Belgrade, Serbia
C	40	Meioshe Mason	6 ft 4 in (1.93 m)	RS So	Lebanon High School	Lebanon, Tennessee
F	42	Stanislava Kabernick	6 ft 1 in (1.85 m)	RS Fr	Olympic Reserve School Number 1	St. Petersburg, Russia

Head coach

- Rick Insell (Middle Tennessee)

Assistant coach(es)

- Matt Insell (Middle Tennessee)
- Kim Brewton (Liberty)
- Nina Davis (Baylor)
- Tom Hodges (Tennessee Tech)
- Courtney Whitson (Middle Tennessee)

Legend

- (C) Team captain
- (S) Suspended
- (I) Ineligible
- (W) Walk-on
- (5Y) Fifth-year senior
- Injured
- Current redshirt

Roster
Last update: January 30, 2025

== Schedule and results ==
Date time, TV	Rank^{#}	Opponent^{#}	Result	Record	High points	High rebounds	High assists	Site (attendance) city, state
Exhibition
October 25, 2024*; 6:30 pm		UT Southern	W 104–66	–	24 – Scott	11 – Boldyreva	8 – Blakely	Murphy Center (2,121); Murfreesboro, TN
October 30, 2024*; 6:30 pm		Lindsey Wilson	W 71–32	–	20 – Scott	19 – Boldyreva	6 – Blakely	Murphy Center (2,015); Murfreesboro, TN
Non-conference regular season
November 4, 2024*; 5:00 pm, ESPN+		at Northern Kentucky	W 79–58	1–0	24 – Scott	9 – tied	3 – Blakely	Truist Arena (1,264); Highland Heights, KY
November 8, 2024*; 6:30 pm, ESPN+		Grand Canyon; C-USA/WAC Alliance	W 57–47	2–0	17 – Scott	7 – Scott	6 – Scott	Murphy Center (3,712); Murfreesboro, TN
November 12, 2024*; 5:30 pm, SECN+		at Tennessee	L 75–89	2–1	25 – Blakely	7 – Boldyreva	5 – Arike	Thompson–Boling Arena (9,697); Knoxville, TN
November 17, 2024*; 2:00 pm, ESPN+		Alcorn State	W 80–48	3–1	19 – tied	9 – tied	3 – Scott	Murphy Center (3,602); Murfreesboro, TN
November 19, 2024*; 6:30 pm, ESPN+		Tennessee Tech	W 69–52	4–1	23 – Scott	9 – tied	8 – Blakely	Murphy Center (3,902); Murfreesboro, TN
November 26, 2024*; 11:00 am		at Florida A&M	W 80–54	5–1	19 – Boldyreva	7 – Boldyreva	5 – Blakely	Al Lawson Center (173); Tallahassee, FL
November 28, 2024*; 3:30 pm		vs. Purdue; Fort Myers Tip-Off Island Division	W 54–49	6–1	19 – Boldyreva	10 – Boldyreva	5 – Blakely	Suncoast Credit Union Arena (1,896); Fort Myers, FL
November 30, 2024*; 12:30 pm		vs. No. 15 Iowa State; Fort Myers Tip-Off Island Division	L 59–75	6–2	24 – Scott	6 – Boldyreva	2 – Scott	Suncoast Credit Union Arena (1,913); Fort Myers, FL
December 4, 2024*; 11:00 am, ESPN+		SIU Edwardsville	W 85–41	7–2	20 – Gregory	14 – Boldyreva	7 – Blakely	Murphy Center (5,682); Murfreesboro, TN
December 7, 2024*; 12:00 pm, ESPN+		at Belmont	L 52–65	7–3	15 – tied	12 – Boldyreva	5 – Boldyreva	Curb Event Center (1,219); Nashville, TN
December 14, 2024*; 5:00 pm, ESPN+		vs. No. 13 Kansas State; Bill Snyder Basketball Classic	L 48–74	7–4	18 – Gregory	9 – Boldyreva	2 – tied	St. Joseph Civic Arena (2,115); St. Joseph, MO
December 17, 2024*; 8:00 pm, ESPN+		at California Baptist; C-USA/WAC Alliance	W 74–54	8–4	20 – Gregory	16 – Boldyreva	6 – Blakely	Fowler Events Center (395); Riverside, CA
December 29, 2024*; 1:00 pm, ESPN+		at Princeton	L 51–64	8–5	21 – Scott	10 – Scott	2 – Blakely	Jadwin Gymnasium (1,079); Princeton, NJ
C-USA regular season
January 2, 2025; 6:30 pm, ESPN+		FIU	W 69–38	9–5 (1–0)	17 – Gregory	10 – Boldyreva	10 – Blakely	Murphy Center (3,209); Murfreesboro, TN
January 4, 2025; 3:00 pm, ESPNU/ESPN+		Liberty	W 69–41	10–5 (2–0)	26 – Gregory	9 – tied	3 – Gregory	Murphy Center (4,107); Murfreesboro, TN
January 9, 2025; 6:00 pm, ESPN+		at Kennesaw State	W 59–47	11–5 (3–0)	26 – Boldyreva	12 – Scott	7 – Blakely	KSU Convocation Center (534); Kennesaw, GA
January 11, 2025; 1:30 pm, ESPN+		at Jacksonville State	W 69–35	12–5 (4–0)	21 – Boldyreva	13 – Boldyreva	7 – Blakely	Pete Mathews Coliseum (511); Jacksonville, AL
January 18, 2025; 2:00 pm, ESPN+		at Western Kentucky	L 58–63	12–6 (4–1)	25 – Scott	16 – Boldyreva	3 – tied	E. A. Diddle Arena (1,499); Bowling Green, KY
January 23, 2025; 6:30 pm, ESPN+		Sam Houston	W 66–38	13–6 (5–1)	18 – Blakely	15 – Boldyreva	4 – Blakely	Murphy Center (2,806); Murfreesboro, TN
January 25, 2025; 12:00 pm, ESPN+		Louisiana Tech	W 61–43	14–6 (6–1)	22 – Boldyreva	15 – Boldyreva	2 – tied	Murphy Center (3,212); Murfreesboro, TN
January 30, 2025; 7:00 pm, ESPN+		at New Mexico State	W 66–59 ^{OT}	15–6 (7–1)	27 – Boldyreva	9 – Scott	6 – Blakely	Pan American Center (366); Las Cruces, NM
February 1, 2025; 2:00 pm, ESPN+		at UTEP	W 64-42	16−6 (8−1)	20 – Scott	9 – Scott	7 – Blakely	Don Haskins Center (1,565); El Paso, TX
February 6, 2025; 6:30 pm, ESPN+		Jacksonville State	W 63-46	17−6 (9−1)	30 – Scott	14 – Scott	4 – Blakely	Murphy Center (2,806); Murfreesboro, TN
February 8, 2025; 5:00 pm, ESPN+		Kennesaw State	W 76-43	18−6 (10−1)	24 – Scott	8 – Scott	5 – Blakely	Murphy Center (3,001); Murfreesboro, TN
February 15, 2025; 2:00 pm, ESPN+		Western Kentucky	W 73-63	19−6 (11−1)	24 – Scott	12 – Boldyreva	5 – Blakely	Murphy Center (4,433); Murfreesboro, TN
February 20, 2025; 6:30 pm, ESPN+		at Louisiana Tech	W 55−46	20−6 (12−1)	16 – Boldyreva	11 – Boldyreva	5 – Blakely	Thomas Assembly Center (1,042); Ruston, LA
February 22, 2025; 2:00 pm, ESPN+		at Sam Houston	W 59-46	21−6 (13−1)	20 – Scott	14 – Boldyreva	5 – Gregory	Bernard Johnson Coliseum (494); Huntsville, TX
February 27, 2025; 6:30 pm, ESPN+		New Mexico State	W 63−41	22−6 (14−1)	20 – Scott	12 – Arike	4 – Blakely	Murphy Center (3,627); Murfreesboro, TN
March 1, 2025; 1:00 pm, ESPN+		UTEP	W 57-35	23-6 (15-1)	25 – Scott	9 – Boldyreva	5 – Blakely	Murphy Center (3,806); Murfreesboro, TN
March 6, 2025; 6:00 pm, ESPN+		at Liberty	L 42-61	23-7 (15-2)	16 – Boldyreva	6 – Boldyreva	5 – Blakely	Liberty Arena (1,574); Lynchburg, VA
March 8, 2025; 12:00 pm, ESPN+		at FIU	W 65−44	24−7 (16−2)	22 – Gregory	8 – Boldyreva	3 – Arike	Ocean Bank Convocation Center (723); Miami, FL
C-USA tournament
March 12, 2025; 2:00 pm, ESPN+	(2)	vs. (7) Kennesaw State; Quarterfinals	W 73–46	25–7	29 – Boldyreva	8 – Scott	6 – Blakely	Propst Arena (2,506); Huntsville, AL
March 14, 2025; 8:00 pm, ESPN+	(2)	vs. (3) Western Kentucky; Semifinals	W 71–63	26–7	17 – Scott	10 – Boldyreva	3 – Gregory	Propst Arena (2,615); Huntsville, AL
March 15, 2025; 4:30 pm, CBSSN	(2)	vs. (1) Liberty; Championship	L 48–53	26–8	23 – Scott	10 – Scott	3 – Blakely	Propst Arena (2,006); Huntsville, AL
WBIT
March 20, 2025*; 6:30 pm, ESPN+		at (3) Belmont; First round	L 51–64	26–9	16 – Scott	10 – Boldyreva	3 – tied	Curb Event Center (1,009); Nashville, TN
*Non-conference game. ^{#}Rankings from AP poll. (#) Tournament seedings in parentheses. All times are in Central.
