= 2024–25 Kennesaw State Owls women's basketball team =

American college basketball season

2024–25 Kennesaw State Owls women's basketball
- Conference: Conference USA
- Record: 13–18 (7–11 C-USA)
- Head coach: Octavia Blue (4th season)
- Associate head coach: Keisha McClinic
- Assistant coaches: Morgan Stroman; Reshad Baker
- Home arena: KSU Convocation Center

2024–25 Conference USA women's basketball standings
	Conf.				Overall
Team	W		L	PCT	W		L	PCT
Liberty †	16	–	2	.889	26	–	7	.788
Middle Tennessee	16	–	2	.889	26	–	9	.743
Western Kentucky	13	–	5	.722	23	–	9	.719
New Mexico State	10	–	8	.556	18	–	16	.529
Louisiana Tech	8	–	10	.444	18	–	16	.529
FIU	7	–	11	.389	11	–	19	.367
Kennesaw State	7	–	11	.389	13	–	18	.419
Sam Houston	5	–	13	.278	13	–	17	.433
Jacksonville State	4	–	14	.222	10	–	20	.333
UTEP	4	–	14	.222	11	–	19	.367
† 2025 CUSA tournament winner

The 2024–25 Kennesaw State Owls women's basketball team represented Kennesaw State University during the 2024–25 NCAA Division I women's basketball season. The Owls, led by fourth-year head coach Octavia Blue, played their home games at the KSU Convocation Center in Kennesaw, Georgia, as first-year members of Conference USA.

== Previous season ==
The Owls finished the 2023–24 season 11–19, 7–9 in ASUN play, to finish in eighth place. They were defeated by Austin Peay in the first round of the ASUN tournament. This would be Kennesaw State's final season as members of the Atlantic Sun Conference, as they moved to Conference USA, effective July 1, 2024.

== Roster ==
2024–25 Kennesaw State Owls women's basketball team
Players
Coaches

Pos.	#	Name	Height	Year	Previous school	Hometown
G	0	Kailyn Fields	5 ft 6 in (1.68 m)	So	The Galloway School	Atlanta, Georgia
G	1	Carly Hooks (C)	5 ft 8 in (1.73 m)	GS	East Tennessee State	Atlanta, Georgia
F	2	Trynce Taylor	6 ft 1 in (1.85 m)	So	St. Francis School	Alpharetta, Georgia
G	3	Lee Lee Willis	5 ft 6 in (1.68 m)	Jr	Chandler AZ Compass Prep	Chandler, Arizona
F	4	Keiara Griffin	6 ft 0 in (1.83 m)	GS	Jacksonville State	Birmingham, Alabama
G	10	Gabriela Bendeck-Giron	5 ft 4 in (1.63 m)	Jr	Pensacola State College	Barranquilla, Colombia
F	11	Claire Davis	6 ft 2 in (1.88 m)	Jr	Palm Beach Atlantic	Cartersville, Georgia
G	12	Sophia Rueppell	5 ft 8 in (1.73 m)	So	Bishop Kenny High School	Jacksonville, Florida
G	15	Morgan Dillard	5 ft 10 in (1.78 m)	Sr	Southern Miss	Sanford, Florida
G	21	Keyarah Berry	5 ft 9 in (1.75 m)	Sr	Indiana	Rockmart, Georgia
F	24	Prencis Harden (C)	5 ft 11 in (1.8 m)	Sr	Emanuel County Institute	Swainsboro, Georgia
C	33	Mame Kane	6 ft 6 in (1.98 m)	Fr	The Academy of Central Florida	Dakar, Senegal
F	45	Taylor Cullinan	6 ft 3 in (1.91 m)	Sr	Alabama	Dallas, Georgia

Head coach

- Octavia Blue (Miami (FL))

Assistant coach(es)

- Keisha McClinic (Middle Tennessee)
- Morgan Stroman (Miami (FL))
- Reshad Baker (Southern)

Legend

- (C) Team captain
- (S) Suspended
- (I) Ineligible
- (W) Walk-on
- Injured
- Current redshirt

Roster
Last update: February 3, 2025

== Schedule and results ==
Date time, TV	Rank^{#}	Opponent^{#}	Result	Record	High points	High rebounds	High assists	Site (attendance) city, state
Non-conference regular season
November 4, 2024*; 7:00 pm, ESPN+		Life	W 72–53	1–0	14 – Harden	7 – Harden	4 – tied	KSU Convocation Center (647); Kennesaw, GA
November 9, 2024*; 7:00 pm, ESPN+		Utah Valley; C-USA/WAC Alliance	L 61–64	1–1	20 – Berry	10 – Harden	4 – Dillard	KSU Convocation Center (470); Kennesaw, GA
November 14, 2024*; 7:30 pm, ESPN+		at Belmont	L 47–75	1–2	24 – Berry	8 – tied	2 – tied	Curb Event Center (756); Nashville, TN
November 16, 2024*; 5:00 pm, ESPN+		Erskine	W 94–44	2–2	24 – Berry	11 – Harden	5 – Fields	KSU Convocation Center (482); Kennesaw, GA
November 21, 2024*; 8:00 pm, MWN		at San Jose State	L 64–68	2–3	12 – Hooks	9 – Harden	2 – tied	Provident Credit Union Event Center (321); San Jose, CA
December 1, 2024*; 2:00 pm, ACCNX		at Clemson	L 48–67	2–4	11 – Harden	6 – tied	2 – tied	Littlejohn Coliseum (1,005); Clemson, SC
December 8, 2024*; 2:00 pm, ESPN+		at Chattanooga	W 64–42	3–4	18 – Harden	15 – Berry	4 – Willis	McKenzie Arena (1,412); Chattanooga, TN
December 13, 2024*; 7:00 pm, ESPN+		at Florida Atlantic	L 56–71	3–5	14 – Harden	13 – Harden	2 – tied	Eleanor R. Baldwin Arena (516); Boca Raton, FL
December 16, 2024*; 9:00 pm, ESPN+		at Seattle; C-USA/WAC Alliance	W 64–41	4–5	22 – Harden	13 – Harden	5 – Fields	Redhawk Center (143); Seattle, WA
December 19, 2024*; 7:00 pm, ESPN+		Georgia State	W 65–62	5–5	26 – Harden	10 – Griffin	4 – tied	KSU Convocation Center (658); Kennesaw, GA
December 30, 2024*; 7:00 pm, ESPN+		Mercer	L 59–62	5–6	34 – Harden	15 – Harden	5 – Fields	KSU Convocation Center (710); Kennesaw, GA
C-USA regular season
January 4, 2025; 3:30 pm, ESPN+		at Jacksonville State	L 56–68	5–7 (0–1)	14 – Hooks	13 – Harden	6 – Hooks	Pete Mathews Coliseum (688); Jacksonville, AL
January 9, 2025; 7:00 pm, ESPN+		Middle Tennessee	L 47–59	5–8 (0–2)	21 – Harden	16 – Harden	3 – Hooks	KSU Convocation Center (534); Kennesaw, GA
January 11, 2025; 1:00 pm, ESPN+		Western Kentucky	L 62–72	5–9 (0–3)	19 – tied	11 – Harden	6 – Hooks	KSU Convocation Center; Kennesaw, GA
January 16, 2025; 7:30 pm, ESPN+		at Sam Houston	W 85–73 ^{OT}	6–9 (1–3)	26 – Harden	16 – Harden	6 – Hooks	Bernard Johnson Coliseum (587); Huntsville, TX
January 18, 2025; 4:00 pm, ESPN+		at Louisiana Tech	L 71–83	6–10 (1–4)	18 – Griffin	12 – Harden	5 – Fields	Thomas Assembly Center; Ruston, LA
January 23, 2025; 7:00 pm, ESPN+		New Mexico State	W 68–66	7–10 (2–4)	21 – tied	16 – Harden	3 – tied	KSU Convocation Center (709); Kennesaw, GA
January 25, 2025; 2:00 pm, ESPN+		UTEP	W 84–70	8–10 (3–4)	20 – Berry	15 – Harden	8 – Hooks	KSU Convocation Center (688); Kennesaw, GA
January 30, 2025; 7:00 pm, ESPN+		at Liberty	L 39–74	8–11 (3–5)	18 – Hooks	7 – Harden	3 – Fields	Liberty Arena (941); Lynchburg, VA
February 1, 2025; 1:00 pm, ESPN+		at FIU	L 64–65	8–12 (3–6)	16 – Willis	7 – Harden	5 – Fields	Ocean Bank Convocation Center (534); Miami, FL
February 6, 2025; 7:30 pm, ESPN+		at Western Kentucky						E. A. Diddle Arena; Bowling Green, KY
February 8, 2025; 6:00 pm, ESPN+		at Middle Tennessee						Murphy Center; Murfreesboro, TN
February 13, 2025; 7:00 pm, ESPN+		Louisiana Tech						KSU Convocation Center; Kennesaw, GA
February 15, 2025; 2:00 pm, ESPN+		Sam Houston						KSU Convocation Center; Kennesaw, GA
February 20, 2025; 9:00 pm, ESPN+		at UTEP						Don Haskins Center; El Paso, TX
February 22, 2025; 4:00 pm, ESPN+		at New Mexico State	L 57−61	10−16 (5−10)	21 – Berry	10 – Harden	3 – Hooks	Pan American Center (478); Las Cruces, NM
February 27, 2025; 7:00 pm, ESPN+		FIU	W 53−50	11−16 (6−10)	19 – Berry	11 – Berry	3 – Willis	KSU Convocation Center (590); Kennesaw, GA
March 1, 2025; 2:00 pm, ESPN+		Liberty						KSU Convocation Center; Kennesaw, GA
March 8, 2025; 2:00 pm, ESPN+		Jacksonville State						KSU Convocation Center; Kennesaw, GA
C-USA tournament
March 11, 2025; 2:00 pm, ESPN+/CBSSN	(7)	vs. (10) UTEP; First round	W 71−63		– -	– -	– -	Propst Arena; Huntsville, AL
March 12, 2025; 2:00 pm, ESPN+/CBSSN	(7)	vs. (2) Middle Tennessee; Quarterfinals	L 46−73		– -	– -	– -	Propst Arena; Huntsville, AL
*Non-conference game. ^{#}Rankings from AP poll. (#) Tournament seedings in parentheses. All times are in Eastern.
