= 2024–25 Louisiana Tech Lady Techsters basketball team =

American college basketball season

2024–25 Louisiana Tech Lady Techsters basketball

WNIT, Great 8
- Conference: Conference USA
- Record: 18–16 (8–10 C-USA)
- Head coach: Brooke Stoehr (9th season)
- Assistant coaches: Scott Stoehr; Josh Ashley; Olivia Grayson; Caleb Livingston
- Home arena: Thomas Assembly Center

2024–25 Conference USA women's basketball standings
	Conf.				Overall
Team	W		L	PCT	W		L	PCT
Liberty †	16	–	2	.889	26	–	7	.788
Middle Tennessee	16	–	2	.889	26	–	9	.743
Western Kentucky	13	–	5	.722	23	–	9	.719
New Mexico State	10	–	8	.556	18	–	16	.529
Louisiana Tech	8	–	10	.444	18	–	16	.529
FIU	7	–	11	.389	11	–	19	.367
Kennesaw State	7	–	11	.389	13	–	18	.419
Sam Houston	5	–	13	.278	13	–	17	.433
Jacksonville State	4	–	14	.222	10	–	20	.333
UTEP	4	–	14	.222	11	–	19	.367
† 2025 CUSA tournament winner

The 2024–25 Louisiana Tech Lady Techsters basketball team represented Louisiana Tech University during the 2024–25 NCAA Division I women's basketball season. The Lady Techsters, led by ninth-year head coach Brooke Stoehr, played their home games at the Thomas Assembly Center in Ruston, Louisiana as members of Conference USA.

== Previous season ==
The Lady Techsters finished the 2023–24 season 14–19, 7–9 in C-USA play, to finish in a tie for fourth place. They defeated Jacksonville State, before falling to top-seeded and eventual tournament champions Middle Tennessee in the semifinals of the C-USA tournament.

== Roster ==
2024–25 Louisiana Tech Lady Techsters women's basketball team
Players
Coaches

Pos.	#	Name	Height	Year	Previous school	Hometown
F	0	Adna Halilbasic	6 ft 2 in (1.88 m)	Fr	Hittorf Gymnasium	Recklinghausen, Germany
G	1	Autumn Smith	5 ft 6 in (1.68 m)	Sr	Martin High School	Arlington, Texas
G	3	Robyn Lee	5 ft 8 in (1.73 m)	GS	Moss Point High School	Moss Point, Mississippi
F	10	Melissa Mwanza	6 ft 2 in (1.88 m)	So	Richmond	Harare, Zimbabwe
F	12	Elina Syniakova	6 ft 2 in (1.88 m)	Fr	Secondary School No. 15 Zhmikov	Dnipro, Ukraine
F	15	Jordan Marshall	6 ft 0 in (1.83 m)	Fr	Little Rock Central High School	Little Rock, Arkansas
F	18	Isla Airey	6 ft 4 in (1.93 m)	Fr	Caulfield Grammar School	Melbourne, Australia
F	21	Taylor Rietveld	6 ft 0 in (1.83 m)	Fr	Camden County High School	Woodbine, Georgia
G	22	Jianna Morris	5 ft 7 in (1.7 m)	So	Sylvan Hills High School	Sherwood, Arkansas
G	23	Paris Bradley	5 ft 9 in (1.75 m)	Fr	Hebron High School	Carrollton, Texas
F	25	Averi Aaron	6 ft 1 in (1.85 m)	Fr	Boerne High School	Boerne, Texas
G	30	Sydney Thomas	5 ft 8 in (1.73 m)	GS	Kentucky State	Kennesaw, Georgia
F	33	Mackenzie Wurm	6 ft 4 in (1.93 m)	Sr	Allen High School	Allen, Texas

Head coach

- Brooke Stoehr (Louisiana Tech)

Assistant coach(es)

- Scott Stoehr (North Texas)
- Josh Ashley (Tarleton State)
- Olivia Grayson (Tulane)
- Caleb Livingston (Williams Baptist)

Legend

- (C) Team captain
- (S) Suspended
- (I) Ineligible
- (W) Walk-on
- Injured
- Current redshirt

Roster
Last update: January 31, 2025

== Schedule and results ==
Date time, TV	Rank^{#}	Opponent^{#}	Result	Record	High points	High rebounds	High assists	Site (attendance) city, state
Non-conference regular season
November 4, 2024*; 11:30 am, ESPN+		Nicholls	W 53–51	1–0	19 – Morris	11 – Mwanza	3 – tied	Thomas Assembly Center (2,660); Ruston, LA
November 7, 2024*; 11:00 am, ESPN+		at South Alabama	W 78–70	2–0	20 – Morris	7 – Marshall	4 – Bradley	Mitchell Center (2,030); Mobile, AL
November 10, 2024*; 6:00 pm, ESPN+		UT Arlington; C-USA/WAC Alliance	W 71–60	3–0	22 – Marshall	12 – Airey	2 – tied	Thomas Assembly Center (1,543); Ruston, LA
November 16, 2024*; 7:00 pm, ESPN+		at Stephen F. Austin	L 56–70	3–1	16 – Marshall	14 – Marshall	3 – Lee	William R. Johnson Coliseum (1,031); Nacogdoches, TX
November 19, 2024*; 6:30 pm, ESPN+		Mississippi Valley State	W 66–59	4–1	18 – Marshall	14 – Marshall	3 – Marshall	Thomas Assembly Center (989); Ruston, LA
November 23, 2024*; 3:00 pm, ESPN+		Southeastern Louisiana	L 47–59	4–2	17 – Lee	8 – Airey	2 – tied	Thomas Assembly Center (1,050); Ruston, LA
December 1, 2024*; 2:00 pm, ESPN+		at Baylor	L 54–98	4–3	15 – Bradley	7 – Marshall	2 – tied	Foster Pavilion (3,621); Waco, TX
December 7, 2024*; 3:00 pm, ESPN+		Alcorn State	W 79–45	5–3	16 – Marshall	12 – Marshall	5 – tied	Thomas Assembly Center (958); Ruston, LA
December 15, 2024*; 2:00 pm, ESPN+		at No. 12 TCU	L 41–92	5–4	15 – Bradley	5 – Rietveld	2 – Bradley	Schollmaier Arena (2,088); Fort Worth, TX
December 19, 2024*; 6:30 pm, ESPN+		Central Baptist	W 112–42	6–4	17 – tied	7 – tied	7 – Lee	Thomas Assembly Center (925); Ruston, LA
December 30, 2024*; 2:00 pm, ESPN+		LSU–Alexandria	W 86–41	7–4	20 – Lee	10 – Lee	5 – tied	Thomas Assembly Center (951); Ruston, LA
C-USA regular season
January 2, 2025; 6:30 pm, ESPN+		UTEP	W 63–50	8–4 (1–0)	17 – Lee	8 – Airey	7 – Bradley	Thomas Assembly Center (1,016); Ruston, LA
January 4, 2025; 2:00 pm, ESPN+		New Mexico State	W 67–58	9–4 (2–0)	15 – tied	9 – Marshall	4 – Bradley	Thomas Assembly Center (1,031); Ruston, LA
January 9, 2025; 6:00 pm, ESPN+		at FIU	L 61–72	9–5 (2–1)	20 – Bradley	6 – Bradley	3 – tied	Ocean Bank Convocation Center (611); Miami, FL
January 11, 2025; 1:00 pm, ESPN+		at Liberty	L 64–75	9–6 (2–2)	19 – Lee	7 – Aaron	2 – tied	Liberty Arena (1,029); Lynchburg, VA
January 16, 2025; 6:30 pm, ESPN+		Jacksonville State	W 80–73	10–6 (3–2)	15 – Lee	9 – Bradley	3 – Aaron	Thomas Assembly Center (1,053); Ruston, LA
January 18, 2025; 3:00 pm, ESPN+		Kennesaw State	W 83–71	11–6 (4–2)	21 – Bradley	9 – Airey	2 – tied	Thomas Assembly Center; Ruston, LA
January 23, 2025; 11:00 am, ESPN+		at Western Kentucky	L 61–69	11–7 (4–3)	19 – Morris	11 – Marshall	3 – Marshall	E. A. Diddle Arena (4,313); Bowling Green, KY
January 25, 2025; 12:00 pm, ESPN+		at Middle Tennessee	L 43–61	11–8 (4–4)	21 – Bradley	10 – Lee	2 – Lee	Murphy Center (3,212); Murfreesboro, TN
February 1, 2025; 2:00 pm, ESPN+		at Sam Houston	L 65–70	11–9 (4–5)	18 – tied	12 – Marshall	5 – Bradley	Bernard Johnson Coliseum (536); Huntsville, TX
February 6, 2025; 6:30 pm, ESPN+		Liberty	W 67−66	12−9 (5−5)	19 – Bradley	6 – tied	7 – Bradley	Thomas Assembly Center (1,258); Ruston, LA
February 8, 2025; 3:00 pm, ESPN+		FIU	W 69−59	13−9 (6−5)	17 – Bradley	15 – Marshall	4 – Bradley	Thomas Assembly Center (1,202); Ruston, LA
February 13, 2025; 6:00 pm, ESPN+		at Kennesaw State	L 72−79	13−10 (6−6)	19 – Bradley	11 – Marshall	3 – Morris	KSU Convocation Center (562); Kennesaw, GA
February 15, 2025; 2:30 pm, ESPN+		at Jacksonville State	L 55−68	13−11 (6−7)	16 – Morris	11 – Marshall	2 – Bradley	Pete Mathews Coliseum (512); Jacksonville, AL
February 20, 2025; 6:30 pm, ESPN+		Middle Tennessee	L 46−55	13−12 (6−8)	14 – Marshall	9 – Marshall	3 – Lee	Thomas Assembly Center (1,042); Ruston, LA
February 22, 2025; 6:00 pm, ESPN+		Western Kentucky	L 73−78	13−13 (6−9)	29 – Bradley	11 – Marshall	2 – Bradley	Thomas Assembly Center (1,144); Ruston, LA
February 27, 2025; 6:30 pm, ESPN+		Sam Houston	W 76−55	14−13 (7−9)	25 – Bradley	10 – Marshall	5 – Bradley	Thomas Assembly Center (1,348); Ruston, LA
March 6, 2025; 7:00 pm, ESPN+		at New Mexico State	L 80−87	14−14 (7−10)	22 – Bradley	9 – Marshall	6 – Bradley	Pan American Center (446); Las Cruces, NM
March 8, 2025; 3:00 pm, ESPN+		at UTEP	W 69−51	15−14 (8−10)	24 – Bradley	9 – Marshall	3 – tied	Don Haskins Center (1,337); El Paso, TX
C-USA tournament
March 13, 2025; 11:30 am, ESPN+	(5)	vs. (4) New Mexico State; Quarterfinals	W 60–55	16–14	18 – Aaron	13 – Marshall	2 – tied	Propst Arena (1,985); Huntsville, AL
March 14, 2025; 5:30 pm, ESPN+	(5)	vs. (1) Liberty; Semifinals	L 53–80	16–15	16 – Aaron	7 – Aaron	4 – Bradley	Propst Arena (2,138); Huntsville, AL
WNIT
March 24, 2025; 6:30 pm, ESPN+		Texas Southern; Second Round	W 71–64	17–15	19 – tied	14 – Marshall	5 – Bradley	Thomas Assembly Center; Ruston, LA
March 26, 2025; 6:30 p.m., ESPN+		Lindenwood; Super 16	W 68–64	18–15	24 – Bradley	12 – Airey	3 – Lee	Thomas Assembly Center (681); Ruston, LA
March 31, 2025; 7:00 p.m.		Illinois State; Great 8	L 70–78	18–16	18 – Bradley	8 – Marshall	4 – Bradley	CEFCU Arena (2,168); Normal, IL
*Non-conference game. ^{#}Rankings from AP poll. (#) Tournament seedings in parentheses. All times are in Central.
