= 2024–25 UTSA Roadrunners women's basketball team =

American college basketball season

2024–25 UTSA Roadrunners women's basketball

AAC regular season champions

WBIT, First round
- Conference: American Athletic Conference
- Record: 26–5 (17–1 AAC)
- Head coach: Karen Aston (4th season)
- Associate head coach: Jamie Carey
- Assistant coaches: Cameron Miles; Chantel Govan; Sophia Ramos; Angel Almaguer
- Home arena: Convocation Center

2024–25 American Athletic Conference women's basketball standings
	Conf.				Overall
Team	W		L	PCT	W		L	PCT
UTSA	17	–	1	.944	26	–	5	.839
North Texas	15	–	3	.833	25	–	9	.735
South Florida †	13	–	4	.765	23	–	11	.676
Temple	13	–	5	.722	20	–	11	.645
Tulsa	11	–	7	.611	17	–	15	.531
Tulane	9	–	8	.529	17	–	13	.567
East Carolina	8	–	10	.444	17	–	15	.531
UAB	7	–	11	.389	16	–	16	.500
Rice	7	–	11	.389	17	–	17	.500
Memphis	5	–	13	.278	7	–	23	.233
Wichita State	4	–	14	.222	10	–	22	.313
Charlotte	4	–	14	.222	11	–	21	.344
Florida Atlantic	3	–	15	.167	11	–	21	.344
† 2025 AAC tournament winner

The 2024–25 UTSA Roadrunners women's basketball team represented the University of Texas at San Antonio during the 2024–25 NCAA Division I women's basketball season. The Roadrunners, led by fourth-year head coach Karen Aston, played their home games at the Convocation Center in San Antonio, Texas, as second-year members of the American Athletic Conference.

The Roadrunners were undefeated at home all season. On 1 March, their final home games, the Runners broke several team records. They set an all time attendance record and most wins per season. They were 17-1 in conference play; earning them the top seed in the conference tournament. On March 6, the American announced Karen Aston was unanimously voted Coach of the Year, Senior Jordyn Jenkins was selected Player of the Year, and Incarnate Word transfer Nina De Leon Negron claimed Newcomer of the Year. The morning of 10 March, the Roadrunners received their first AP top 25 vote in program history received one vote for the 19th week of the season. However, ninth seeded Rice upset them in the AAC tournament quarterfinal game later that day. On March 16, Selection Sunday,tne NCAA released the WBIT bracket revealing that the Roadrunners would face Gonzaga.

== Previous season ==
The Roadrunners finished the 2023–24 season 18–15, 10–8 in AAC play to finish in a tie for fourth place. They defeated South Florida, before being upset by East Carolina in the semifinals of the AAC tournament. They received an at-large bid to the WNIT, where they would defeat Northern Colorado in the first round, before falling to Wyoming in the second round.

=== Transfers ===
UTSA incoming transfers
Name	Number	Pos.	Height	Year	Hometown	Previous school
Nyayongah Gony	7	F	6'4"	RS SR	Lincoln, NE	Mississippi State
Nina De Leon Negron	8	G	5'6"	GS	San Juan, PR	Incarnate Word

UTSA outgoing transfers
Name	Number	Pos.	Height	Year	Hometown	New school
Sarai Estupinan	13	G	5'5"	RS SR	Cedar Park, TX	Old Dominion
Madison Cockrell	5	G	5'4"	JR	Dallas, TX	Incarnate Word
Nissa Sam-Grant	30	C	6'4"	GS	Toronto, ON	Arkansas State
Kyleigh McGuire	23	F	5'11"	GS	Houston, TX	Sam Houston

== Roster ==
2024–25 UTSA Roadrunners women's basketball team
Players
Coaches

Pos.	#	Name	Height	Year	Previous school	Hometown
G	1	Siena Guttadauro	5 ft 6 in (1.68 m)	Jr	Archbishop Mitty High School	San Jose, California
G	2	Alexis Parker	5 ft 9 in (1.75 m)	Jr	Brandeis High School	San Antonio, Texas
G	3	Emma Lucio	5 ft 9 in (1.75 m)	So	Robert Vela High School	Edinburg, Texas
G	4	Damara Allen	5 ft 10 in (1.78 m)	Fr	Cherokee Trail High School	Aurora, Colorado
G	5	Mia Hammonds	6 ft 3 in (1.91 m)	Fr	Steele High School	Cibolo, Texas
F	7	Nyayongah Gony	6 ft 4 in (1.93 m)	RS Sr	Mississippi State	Lincoln, Nebraska
G	8	Nina De Leon Negron	5 ft 6 in (1.68 m)	GS	Incarnate Word	San Juan, Puerto Rico
G	11	Sidney Love	5 ft 8 in (1.73 m)	Jr	Steele High School	Cibolo, Texas
G	12	Aysia Proctor	5 ft 8 in (1.73 m)	So	Samuel Clemens High School	Schertz, Texas
F	13	Taylor Ross	6 ft 1 in (1.85 m)	Fr	Brennan High School	San Antonio, Texas
F	20	Maya Linton	5 ft 11 in (1.8 m)	Jr	Duncanville High School	Duncanville, Texas
F	21	Cheyenne Rowe	6 ft 2 in (1.88 m)	Jr	James Madison	Ajax, Ontario
F	25	Idara Udo	6 ft 1 in (1.85 m)	So	Plano East High School	Plano, Texas
F	32	Jordyn Jenkins	6 ft 0 in (1.83 m)	RS Sr	USC	Renton, Washington
F/C	33	Emilia Dannebauer	6 ft 4 in (1.93 m)	Fr	Sportgymnasium Chemnit	Berlin, Germany

Head coach

- Karen Aston (Little Rock)

Assistant coach(es)

- Jamie Carey (Texas)
- Cameron Miles (San Diego)
- Chantel Govan (Texas–San Antonio)
- Sophia Ramos (San Diego State)
- Angel Almaguer (Texas–San Antonio)

Legend

- (C) Team captain
- (S) Suspended
- (I) Ineligible
- (W) Walk-on
- Injured
- Current redshirt

Roster
Last update: December 18, 2024

== Schedule and results ==
Date time, TV	Rank^{#}	Opponent^{#}	Result	Record	High points	High rebounds	High assists	Site (attendance) city, state
Exhibition
November 1, 2024*; 6:30 pm		St. Mary's (TX)	W 90–38	–	–	–	–	Convocation Center; San Antonio, TX
Non-conference regular season
November 7, 2024*; 11:00 am, SECN+		at Texas A&M	L 51–55	0–1	18 – Jenkins	11 – Jenkins	2 – Allen	Reed Arena (7,507); College Station, TX
November 9, 2024*; 2:00 pm, ESPN+		UT Rio Grande Valley	W 74–69	1–1	21 – Love	5 – Tied	11 – Love	Convocation Center (739); San Antonio, TX
November 14, 2024*; 6:00 pm, ESPN+		at New Mexico State	W 75–61	2–1	27 – Jenkins	11 – Jenkins	7 – Love	Pan American Center (812); Las Cruces, NM
November 16, 2024*; 12:00 pm, ESPN+		at UTEP	W 78–73	3–1	30 – Jenkins	12 – Jenkins	8 – De Leon Negron	Don Haskins Center (1,041); El Paso, TX
November 20, 2024*; 6:30 pm, ESPN+		Texas A&M–Corpus Christi	W 62–43	4–1	16 – Tied	10 – Udo	3 – De Leon Negron	Convocation Center (743); San Antonio, TX
November 28, 2024*; 10:00 am		vs. UNC Greensboro; Puerto Rico Clasico	W 62–53	5–1	14 – Jenkins	9 – Jenkins	5 – Love	Coliseo Rubén Rodríguez (100); Bayamón, PR
November 29, 2024*; 1:00 pm		vs. Towson; Puerto Rico Clasico	W 71–40	6–1	18 – Jenkins	6 – Udo	8 – De Leon Negron	Juan Cruz Abreu Coliseum (100); Manatí, PR
December 7, 2024*; 1:00 pm, ESPN+		Sam Houston	W 79–36	7–1	22 – Jenkins	10 – Jenkins	8 – De Leon Negron	Convocation Center (837); San Antonio, TX
December 16, 2024*; 2:00 pm, ACCNX		at Stanford	L 57–62	7–2	14 – Tied	10 – De Leon Negron	3 – De Leon Negron	Maples Pavilion (4,600); Stanford, CA
December 19, 2024*; 4:00 pm, ESPN+		UT Arlington	W 76–61	8–2	21 – Love	6 – De Leon Negron	8 – De Leon Negron	Convocation Center (775); San Antonio, TX
December 21, 2024*; 12:00 pm, ESPN+		at Texas State; I-35 Showdown	W 70–54	9–2	17 – Jenkins	6 – Tied	8 – De Leon Negron	Strahan Arena (1,522); San Marcos, TX
AAC regular season
December 29, 2024; 1:00 pm, ESPN+		at Charlotte	W 64–50	10–2 (1–0)	18 – Jenkins	9 – Linton	7 – De Leon Negron	Dale F. Halton Arena (705); Charlotte, NC
January 1, 2025; 6:30 pm, ESPN+		UAB	W 67–56	11–2 (2–0)	19 – Love	8 – De Leon Negron	7 – Love	Convocation Center (917); San Antonio, TX
January 4, 2025; 2:00 pm, ESPN+		at Tulsa	W 60–53	12–2 (3–0)	30 – Jenkins	10 – Udo	3 – Tied	Reynolds Center (1,317); Tulsa, OK
January 8, 2025; 6:30 pm, ESPN+		Rice	W 67–58	13–2 (4–0)	21 – Jenkins	14 – Jenkins	5 – De Leon Negron	Convocation Center (819); San Antonio, TX
January 11, 2025; 12:00 pm, ESPN+		Wichita State	W 69–51	14–2 (5–0)	21 – Jenkins	10 – Udo	5 – De Leon Negron	Convocation Center (1,000); San Antonio, TX
January 15, 2025; 7:00 pm, ESPN+		at Memphis	W 70–68	15–2 (6–0)	17 – Jenkins	10 – Tied	5 – Love	Elma Roane Fieldhouse (884); Memphis, TN
January 18, 2025; 1:00 pm, ESPN+		at UAB	W 73–63	16–2 (7–0)	21 – Jenkins	9 – Jenkins	6 – Love	Bartow Arena (322); Birmingham, AL
January 22, 2025; 6:30 pm, ESPN+		Tulsa	W 64–53	17–2 (8–0)	19 – De Leon Negron	10 – De Leon Negron	8 – De Leon Negron	Convocation Center (1,345); San Antonio, TX
January 29, 2025; 6:00 pm, ESPN+		at South Florida	L 63–75	17–3 (8–1)	15 – Rowe	6 – De Leon Negron	4 – Love	Yuengling Center (2,754); Tampa, FL
February 1, 2025; 2:00 pm, ESPN+		Temple	W 70–61	18–3 (9–1)	16 – Jenkins	9 – Udo	9 – De Leon Negron	Convocation Center (1,412); San Antonio, TX
February 4, 2025; 6:30 pm, ESPN+		North Texas	W 54–52	19–3 (10–1)	26 – Jenkins	10 – Udo	3 – De Leon Negron	Convocation Center (1,418); San Antonio, TX
February 8, 2025; 1:00 pm, ESPN+		at Wichita State	W 60–49	20–3 (11–1)	14 – Udo	12 – Udo	4 – De Leon Negron	Charles Koch Arena (1,334); Wichita, KS
February 12, 2025; 6:30 pm, ESPN+		East Carolina	W 60–46	21–3 (12–1)	23 – Jenkins	4 – Jenkins	6 – De Leon Negron	Convocation Center (1,000); San Antonio, TX
February 15, 2025; 2:00 pm, ESPN+		Memphis	W 80–61	22–3 (13–1)	16 – De Leon Negron	13 – Udo	6 – De Leon Negron	Convocation Center (1,523); San Antonio, TX
February 22, 2025; 4:00 pm, ESPN+		at Rice	W 57–55	23–3 (14–1)	19 – Jenkins	5 – De Leon Negron	7 – De Leon Negron	Tudor Fieldhouse (856); Houston, TX
February 25, 2025; 6:30 pm, ESPN+		at Tulane	W 77–73	24–3 (15–1)	24 – Jenkins	10 – Jenkins	8 – De Leon Negron	Devlin Fieldhouse (795); New Orleans, LA
March 1, 2025; 12:00 pm, ESPN+		Florida Atlantic	W 60–42	25–3 (16–1)	11 – Tied	10 – Linton	4 – Allen	Convocation Center (2,250); San Antonio, TX
March 4, 2025; 5:00 pm, ESPN+		at East Carolina	W 67-48	26-3 (17-1)	26 – Jenkins	11 – Udo	4 – Love	Williams Arena (952); Greenville, NC
AAC tournament
March 10, 2025; 12:00 pm, ESPN+	(1)	vs. (9) Rice; Quarterfinals	L 58-62	26-4	24 – Jenkins	8 – Udo	5 – Love	Dickies Arena; Fort Worth, TX
WBIT tournament
March 20, 2025; 8:00 pm, ESPN+		at (4) Gonzaga; First Round	L 51-67	26-5	15 – Love	8 – Jenkins	3 – Tied	McCarthey Athletic Center (2,571); Spokane, WA
*Non-conference game. ^{#}Rankings from AP Poll. (#) Tournament seedings in parentheses. All times are in Central.

== Rankings ==
Ranking movements Legend: ██ Increase in ranking ██ Decrease in ranking — = Not ranked RV = Received votes
	Week																				
Poll	Pre	1	2	3	4	5	6	7	8	9	10	11	12	13	14	15	16	17	18	19	Final
AP	—	—	—	—	—	—	—	—	—	—	—	—	—	—	—	—	—	—	—	RV	—
Coaches	—	—	—	—	—	—	—	—	—	—	—	—	—	—	—	—	—	—	—	—	—
