= 2024–25 Liberty Lady Flames basketball team =

American college basketball season

2024–25 Liberty Lady Flames basketball

CUSA co-regular season champions CUSA tournament champions

NCAA tournament, First Round
- Conference: Conference USA
- Record: 26–7 (16–2 C-USA)
- Head coach: Carey Green (26th season)
- Associate head coach: Alexis Sherard
- Assistant coaches: Andrea "Andy" Bloodworth; Katie Mattera; Dan Lumpkin; Amber Lee
- Home arena: Liberty Arena

2024–25 Conference USA women's basketball standings
	Conf.				Overall
Team	W		L	PCT	W		L	PCT
Liberty †	16	–	2	.889	26	–	7	.788
Middle Tennessee	16	–	2	.889	26	–	9	.743
Western Kentucky	13	–	5	.722	23	–	9	.719
New Mexico State	10	–	8	.556	18	–	16	.529
Louisiana Tech	8	–	10	.444	18	–	16	.529
FIU	7	–	11	.389	11	–	19	.367
Kennesaw State	7	–	11	.389	13	–	18	.419
Sam Houston	5	–	13	.278	13	–	17	.433
Jacksonville State	4	–	14	.222	10	–	20	.333
UTEP	4	–	14	.222	11	–	19	.367
† 2025 CUSA tournament winner

The 2024–25 Liberty Lady Flames basketball team represented Liberty University during the 2024–25 NCAA Division I women's basketball season. The Lady Flames, led by 26th-year head coach Carey Green, played their home games at Liberty Arena in Lynchburg, Virginia, as second-year members of Conference USA.

== Previous season ==
The Lady Flames finished the 2023–24 season 18–16, 11–5 in C-USA play, to finish in a tie for second place. They defeated Western Kentucky, and New Mexico State, before falling to top-seeded Middle Tennessee in the C-USA tournament championship game.

== Roster ==
2024–25 Liberty Lady Flames women's basketball team
Players
Coaches

Pos.	#	Name	Height	Year	Previous school	Hometown
G	0	Jordan Hodges	5 ft 6 in (1.68 m)	Sr	Monacan High School	Richmond, Virginia
G	1	Avery Mills	5 ft 9 in (1.75 m)	Fr	Liberty Christian Academy	Milford, Delaware
G	4	Claudia Acin	5 ft 8 in (1.73 m)	So	Les Alzines	Girona, Spain
F	6	Ify Nwaobi	6 ft 2 in (1.88 m)	Fr	Edge School	Calgary, Alberta
G	7	Pien Steenbergen	6 ft 1 in (1.85 m)	RS So	Calandlyceum	Berlicum, Netherlands
G	10	Brooke Moore	6 ft 0 in (1.83 m)	So	North Cobb Christian School	Kennesaw, Georgia
F	11	Caroline Shiery	6 ft 3 in (1.91 m)	RS So	Central Dauphin High School	Harrisburg, Pennsylvania
G	12	Asia Boone	5 ft 8 in (1.73 m)	So	IMG Academy	San Diego, California
C	14	Emily Howard	6 ft 5 in (1.96 m)	RS Jr	Harding Academy	Vancouver, British Columbia
G	15	Maleah Alexander	5 ft 7 in (1.7 m)	Fr	Cooper High School	Burlington, Kentucky
C	17	Emmy Stout	6 ft 3 in (1.91 m)	Fr	Liberty Christian Academy	San Diego, California
F	21	Elisabeth Aegisdottir	6 ft 2 in (1.88 m)	So	Fjolbrautarskoli Suournesja	Grindavík, Iceland
G	22	Anna Badosa	5 ft 9 in (1.75 m)	RS Sr	Franklin Pierce	Girona, Spain
G	23	Emma Hess	6 ft 0 in (1.83 m)	Sr	Legacy Christian Academy	Beavercreek, Ohio
C	31	Bella Smuda	6 ft 6 in (1.98 m)	RS Sr	Downingtown East High School	Exton, Pennsylvania

Head coach

- Carey Green (Coastal Carolina)

Assistant coach(es)

- Alexis Sherard (Saint Michael's)
- Andrea "Andy" Bloodworth (Calvin)
- Katie Mattera (Liberty)
- Dan Lumpkin (Austin Peay)
- Amber Lee (Maryville)

Legend

- (C) Team captain
- (S) Suspended
- (I) Ineligible
- (W) Walk-on
- Injured
- Current redshirt

Roster
Last update: January 30, 2025

== Schedule and results ==
Date time, TV	Rank^{#}	Opponent^{#}	Result	Record	High points	High rebounds	High assists	Site (attendance) city, state
Non-conference regular season
November 4, 2024*; 1:00 pm, Gray Media		vs. Valparaiso; Total Athlete Tip-Off	W 77–58	1–0	20 – Hess	12 – Aegisdottir	8 – Hodges	Wooden Family Fieldhouse (1,200); Xenia, OH
November 7, 2024*; 7:00 pm, ESPN+		No. 11 Duke	L 67–83	1–1	15 – Boone	10 – Aegisdottir	4 – Hess	Liberty Arena (2,845); Lynchburg, VA
November 9, 2024*; 7:00 pm, ESPN+		California Baptist; C-USA/WAC Alliance	W 72–44	2–1	16 – Boone	12 – Smuda	4 – Hodges	Liberty Arena (1,316); Lynchburg, VA
November 16, 2024*; 12:00 pm, SECN+		at Tennessee	L 93–109	2–2	27 – Smuda	6 – Aegisdottir	5 – Aegisdottir	Thompson–Boling Arena (9,109); Knoxville, TN
November 24, 2024*; 1:00 pm, FloHoops		at Towson	W 64–57	3–2	15 – Hess	10 – Smuda	3 – tied	TU Arena (425); Towson, MD
November 27, 2024*; 1:30 pm, ESPN+		at Grand Canyon; C-USA/WAC Alliance	L 50–79	3–3	10 – Howard	5 – Hess	3 – Acin	Global Credit Union Arena (534); Phoenix, AZ
November 30, 2024*; 4:00 pm, ESPN+		Christopher Newport	W 106–58	4–3	19 – Smuda	9 – tied	6 – tied	Liberty Arena (989); Lynchburg, VA
December 7, 2024*; 2:00 pm, ESPN+		North Carolina A&T	W 56–51	5–3	14 – Boone	9 – Aegisdottir	6 – Hess	Liberty Arena (1,013); Lynchburg, VA
December 11, 2024*; 7:00 pm, ESPN+		Randolph	W 109–26	6–3	23 – Stout	16 – Stout	6 – Mills	Liberty Arena (865); Lynchburg, VA
December 18, 2024*; 9:30 pm, Stadium		vs. Arkansas; Cherokee Invitational semifinal	W 75–61	7–3	18 – Hodges	8 – Smuda	3 – tied	Harrah's Cherokee (719); Cherokee, NC
December 19, 2024*; 9:30 pm, Stadium		vs. Toledo; Cherokee Invitational championship	L 63–71	7–4	11 – Smuda	6 – Stout	5 – Hodges	Harrah's Cherokee (1,176); Cherokee, NC
C-USA regular season
January 2, 2025; 7:30 pm, ESPN+		at Western Kentucky	W 77–66	8–4 (1–0)	16 – Hess	9 – Smuda	5 – Hodges	E. A. Diddle Arena (644); Bowling Green, KY
January 4, 2025; 4:00 pm, ESPNU/ESPN+		at Middle Tennessee	L 41–69	8–5 (1–1)	7 – Smuda	7 – Hodges	2 – tied	Murphy Center (4,107); Murfreesboro, TN
January 9, 2025; 7:00 pm, ESPN+		Sam Houston	W 69–54	9–5 (2–1)	19 – Hess	11 – Smuda	4 – Hodges	Liberty Arena (869); Lynchburg, VA
January 11, 2025; 2:00 pm, ESPN+		Louisiana Tech	W 75–64	10–5 (3–1)	13 – Boone	7 – Stout	5 – Badosa	Liberty Arena (1,029); Lynchburg, VA
January 16, 2025; 9:00 pm, ESPN+		at UTEP	W 75–64	11–5 (4–1)	15 – Hess	7 – Smuda	5 – Aegisdottir	Don Haskins Center (1,346); El Paso, TX
January 18, 2025; 4:00 pm, ESPN+		at New Mexico State	W 82–72	12–5 (5–1)	14 – Smuda	8 – Hodges	4 – Mills	Pan American Center (593); Las Cruces, NM
January 25, 2025; 1:00 pm, ESPN+		FIU	W 83–54	13–5 (6–1)	16 – Hess	9 – Smuda	4 – tied	Liberty Arena (1,546); Lynchburg, VA
January 30, 2025; 7:00 pm, ESPN+		Kennesaw State	W 74-39	14-5 (7-1)	14 – Hess	10 – Stout	2 – tied	Liberty Arena (941); Lynchburg, VA
February 1, 2025; 1:00 pm, ESPN+		Jacksonville State						Liberty Arena; Lynchburg, VA
February 6, 2025; 7:30 pm, ESPN+		at Louisiana Tech						Thomas Assembly Center; Ruston, LA
February 8, 2025; 3:00 pm, ESPN+		at Sam Houston						Bernard Johnson Coliseum; Huntsville, TX
February 13, 2025; 7:00 pm, ESPN+		New Mexico State	W 63−58	17−6 (10−2)	14 – Stout	6 – Aegisdottir	3 – Hess	Liberty Arena (874); Lynchburg, VA
February 15, 2025; 2:00 pm, ESPN+		UTEP						Liberty Arena; Lynchburg, VA
February 22, 2025; 1:00 pm, ESPN+		at FIU	W 73−57	19−6 (12−2)	15 – Mills	10 – Smuda	7 – Hodges	Ocean Bank Convocation Center (512); Miami, FL
February 27, 2025; 7:30 pm, ESPN+		at Jacksonville State						Pete Mathews Coliseum; Jacksonville, AL
March 1, 2025; 2:00 pm, ESPN+		at Kennesaw State						KSU Convocation Center; Kennesaw, GA
March 6, 2025; 7:00 pm, ESPN+		Middle Tennessee						Liberty Arena; Lynchburg, VA
March 8, 2025; 2:00 pm, ESPN+		Western Kentucky						Liberty Arena; Lynchburg, VA
C-USA tournament
March 12, 2025; 11:30 am, ESPN+/CBSSN	(1)	vs. (8) Sam Houston; Quarterfinal	W 78−51	24−6	16 – Boone	8 – Moore	3 – tied	Propst Arena (2,205); Huntsville, AL
March 14, 2025; 5:30 pm, ESPN+/CBSSN	(1)	vs. (5) Louisiana Tech; Semifinal	W 80−53	25−6	17 – Mills	7 – Aegisdottir	5 – tied	Propst Arena (2,138); Huntsville, AL
March 15, 2025; 4:30 pm, ESPN+/CBSSN	(1)	vs. (2) Middle Tennessee; Final	W 53−48	26−6	14 – Hess	13 – Smuda	3 – Hess	Propst Arena (2,006); Huntsville, AL
NCAA tournament
March 21, 2025; ESPN+/CBSSN	(13)	vs. (4) Kentucky; First Round	L 78−79	26−7	20 – Stout	12 – Smuda	4 – tied	Memorial Coliseum (4,015); Lexington, KY
*Non-conference game. ^{#}Rankings from AP Poll. (#) Tournament seedings in parentheses. All times are in Eastern.
