= 2024–25 Jacksonville State Gamecocks women's basketball team =

American college basketball season

2024–25 Jacksonville State Gamecocks women's basketball
- Conference: Conference USA
- Record: 10–20 (4–14 C-USA)
- Head coach: Rick Pietri (12th season)
- Assistant coaches: Eric Wise; Ka'Vonne Towns; Destiny Thomas
- Home arena: Pete Mathews Coliseum

2024–25 Conference USA women's basketball standings
	Conf.				Overall
Team	W		L	PCT	W		L	PCT
Liberty †	16	–	2	.889	26	–	7	.788
Middle Tennessee	16	–	2	.889	26	–	9	.743
Western Kentucky	13	–	5	.722	23	–	9	.719
New Mexico State	10	–	8	.556	18	–	16	.529
Louisiana Tech	8	–	10	.444	18	–	16	.529
FIU	7	–	11	.389	11	–	19	.367
Kennesaw State	7	–	11	.389	13	–	18	.419
Sam Houston	5	–	13	.278	13	–	17	.433
Jacksonville State	4	–	14	.222	10	–	20	.333
UTEP	4	–	14	.222	11	–	19	.367
† 2025 CUSA tournament winner

The 2024–25 Jacksonville State Gamecocks women's basketball team represented Jacksonville State University during the 2024–25 NCAA Division I women's basketball season. The Gamecocks, led by 12th-year head coach Rick Pietri, played their home games at the Pete Mathews Coliseum in Jacksonville, Alabama, as second-year members of Conference USA.

== Previous season ==
The Gamecocks finished the 2023–24 season 12–17, 7–9 in C-USA play, to finish in a tie for fourth place. They were defeated by Louisiana Tech in the quarterfinals of the C-USA tournament.

== Roster ==
2024–25 Jacksonville State Gamecocks women's basketball team
Players
Coaches

Pos.	#	Name	Height	Year	Previous school	Hometown
G	1	Eden Sample	5 ft 10 in (1.78 m)	RS Jr	Old Dominion	Suwanee, Georgia
G	2	Shaquice May	5 ft 10 in (1.78 m)	Sr	Rockdale County High School	Atlanta, Georgia
G	3	Samiya Steele	5 ft 8 in (1.73 m)	Jr	Alabama State	Meridianville, Alabama
G	5	Elsie Harris	5 ft 5 in (1.65 m)	RS Sr	Mississippi Gulf Coast Community College	Mobile, Alabama
G	7	Clara Gonzalez Planella	5 ft 8 in (1.73 m)	Jr	Cochise College	Barcelona, Spain
F	10	Bre'Anna Rhodes	6 ft 1 in (1.85 m)	Sr	Carver High School	Montgomery, Alabama
F	14	Valentina Saric	6 ft 2 in (1.88 m)	RS So	Morehead State	Los Altos, California
G	21	Kyera Thornsbury	5 ft 7 in (1.7 m)	Fr	Pikeville High School	Pikeville, Kentucky
F	22	Mya Barnes	6 ft 0 in (1.83 m)	Sr	Shelton State Community College	Montgomery, Alabama
F	23	Brooklyn McDaniel	5 ft 11 in (1.8 m)	Jr	Cleburne County High School	Heflin, Alabama
F	35	Asia Barclay	6 ft 0 in (1.83 m)	Sr	Shelton State Community College	Anniston, Alabama
F	71	Maria Sanchez Ponce	5 ft 10 in (1.78 m)	Jr	Reinhardt	Conil de la Frontera, Spain

Head coach

- Rick Pietri (South Alabama)

Assistant coach(es)

- Eric Wise (Louisiana)
- Ka'Vonne Towns (Chattanooga)
- Destiny Thomas (Clemson)

Legend

- (C) Team captain
- (S) Suspended
- (I) Ineligible
- (W) Walk-on
- Injured
- Current redshirt

Roster
Last update: February 3, 2025

== Schedule and results ==
Date time, TV	Rank^{#}	Opponent^{#}	Result	Record	High points	High rebounds	High assists	Site (attendance) city, state
Exhibition
October 29, 2024*; 11:30 am		Alabama–Huntsville	W 67–51	–	16 – Sample	6 – Barnes	3 – tied	Pete Mathews Coliseum (1,029); Jacksonville, AL
Non-conference regular season
November 4, 2024*; 7:30 pm, ESPN+		at Arizona State	L 66–74	0–1	15 – Rhodes	7 – Barnes	2 – tied	Desert Financial Arena (1,641); Tempe, AZ
November 9, 2024*; 2:30 pm, ESPN+		Southern Utah; C-USA/WAC Alliance	W 77–58	1–1	13 – Harris	7 – Barclay	4 – McDaniel	Pete Mathews Coliseum (519); Jacksonville, AL
November 15, 2024*; 7:00 pm		at South Carolina State	W 72–41	2–1	14 – Saric	7 – Rhodes	5 – Harris	SHM Memorial Center (100); Orangeburg, SC
November 20, 2024*; 6:30 pm, ESPN+		UAB	W 68–56	3–1	16 – tied	10 – Rhodes	4 – Sample	Pete Mathews Coliseum (1,020); Jacksonville, AL
November 25, 2024*; 7:30 pm, ESPN+		Sewanee	W 114–47	4–1	17 – Barnes	13 – Barclay	6 – Harris	Pete Mathews Coliseum (282); Jacksonville, AL
December 1, 2024*; 2:00 pm, SECN+		at Missouri	L 45–79	4–2	10 – Rhodes	5 – tied	2 – tied	Mizzou Arena (2,545); Columbia, MO
December 4, 2024*; 12:00 pm, ESPN+		at Coastal Carolina	L 44–55	4–3	11 – Steele	5 – tied	2 – May	HTC Center (670); Conway, SC
December 11, 2024*; 6:30 pm, ESPN+		Charleston	L 47–66	4–4	10 – Saric	7 – Rhodes	3 – Harris	Pete Mathews Coliseum (753); Jacksonville, AL
December 16, 2024*; 7:00 pm, ESPN+		at Utah Valley; C-USA/WAC Alliance	L 45–49	4–5	19 – Gonzalez Planella	10 – Barnes	3 – Sample	UCCU Center (422); Orem, UT
December 20, 2024*; 4:30 pm, ESPN+		New Orleans	W 57–47	5–5	11 – Saric	7 – Steele	6 – Harris	Pete Mathews Coliseum (189); Jacksonville, AL
December 30, 2024*; 4:30 pm, ESPN+		Life	W 88–52	6–5	17 – Sanchez Ponce	9 – Barclay	5 – tied	Pete Mathews Coliseum (257); Jacksonville, AL
C-USA regular season
January 4, 2025; 2:30 pm, ESPN+		Kennesaw State	W 68–56	7–5 (1–0)	19 – Rhodes	8 – Barnes	3 – Steele	Pete Mathews Coliseum (688); Jacksonville, AL
January 9, 2025; 6:30 pm, ESPN+		Western Kentucky	L 44–51	7–6 (1–1)	12 – Rhodes	6 – tied	2 – tied	Pete Mathews Coliseum (655); Jacksonville, AL
January 11, 2025; 1:30 pm, ESPN+		Middle Tennessee	L 35–69	7–7 (1–2)	12 – Sanchez Ponce	7 – Rhodes	2 – Steele	Pete Mathews Coliseum (511); Jacksonville, AL
January 16, 2025; 6:30 pm, ESPN+		at Louisiana Tech	L 73–80	7–8 (1–3)	16 – Gonzalez Planella	4 – tied	4 – tied	Thomas Assembly Center (1,053); Ruston, LA
January 18, 2025; 2:00 pm, ESPN+		at Sam Houston	L 48–53	7–9 (1–4)	11 – Rhodes	6 – Barnes	3 – tied	Bernard Johnson Coliseum (507); Huntsville, TX
January 23, 2025; 6:00 pm, ESPN+		UTEP	W 72–71 ^{OT}	8–9 (2–4)	16 – Barclay	6 – Barclay	5 – Steele	Pete Mathews Coliseum (455); Jacksonville, AL
January 25, 2025; 1:30 pm, ESPN+		New Mexico State	W 60–56	9–9 (3–4)	15 – Sanchez Ponce	6 – Sanchez Ponce	6 – Steele	Pete Mathews Coliseum (880); Jacksonville, AL
January 30, 2025; 6:00 pm, ESPN+		at FIU	L 52–62	9–10 (3–5)	14 – Sanchez Ponce	6 – Gonzalez Planella	6 – Steele	Ocean Bank Convocation Center (647); Miami, FL
February 1, 2025; 12:00 pm, ESPN+		at Liberty	L 53–62	9–11 (3–6)	15 – Barnes	6 – Barnes	6 – Harris	Liberty Arena (1,011); Lynchburg, VA
February 6, 2025; 6:30 pm, ESPN+		at Middle Tennessee						Murphy Center; Murfreesboro, TN
February 8, 2025; 2:00 pm, ESPN+		at Western Kentucky						E. A. Diddle Arena; Bowling Green, KY
February 13, 2025; 6:30 pm, ESPN+		Sam Houston						Pete Mathews Coliseum; Jacksonville, AL
February 15, 2025; 2:30 pm, ESPN+		Louisiana Tech	W 68−55	10−14 (4−9)	19 – Saric	13 – Barclay	3 – Thornsbury	Pete Mathews Coliseum (512); Jacksonville, AL
February 20, 2025; 7:00 pm, ESPN+		at New Mexico State	L 47−66	10−15 (4−10)	16 – Gonzalez Planella	8 – Barclay	2 – Rhodes	Pan American Center (412); Las Cruces, NM
February 22, 2025; 2:00 pm, ESPN+		at UTEP						Don Haskins Center; El Paso, TX
February 27, 2025; 6:30 pm, ESPN+		Liberty						Pete Mathews Coliseum; Jacksonville, AL
March 1, 2025; 2:30 pm, ESPN+		FIU	L 72−74	10−18 (4−13)	20 – Sanchez Ponce	5 – Harris	6 – Harris	Pete Mathews Coliseum (655); Jacksonville, AL
March 8, 2025; 1:00 pm, ESPN+		at Kennesaw State						KSU Convocation Center; Kennesaw, GA
C-USA tournament
March 11, 2025; 11:30 am, ESPN+/CBSSN	(9)	vs. (8) Sam Houston; First Round	L 53−55	10−20	13 – Harris	10 – Barnes	1 – tied	Propst Arena (2,056); Huntsville, AL
*Non-conference game. ^{#}Rankings from AP poll. (#) Tournament seedings in parentheses. All times are in Central.
