= 2024–25 New Mexico State Aggies women's basketball team =

American college basketball season

2024–25 New Mexico State Aggies women's basketball

WNIT, Second Round
- Conference: Conference USA
- Record: 18–16 (10–8 C-USA)
- Head coach: Jody Adams (3rd season)
- Associate head coach: James Frey
- Assistant coaches: TaQuandra Mike; Preston Planells
- Home arena: Pan American Center

2024–25 Conference USA women's basketball standings
	Conf.				Overall
Team	W		L	PCT	W		L	PCT
Liberty †	16	–	2	.889	26	–	7	.788
Middle Tennessee	16	–	2	.889	26	–	9	.743
Western Kentucky	13	–	5	.722	23	–	9	.719
New Mexico State	10	–	8	.556	18	–	16	.529
Louisiana Tech	8	–	10	.444	18	–	16	.529
FIU	7	–	11	.389	11	–	19	.367
Kennesaw State	7	–	11	.389	13	–	18	.419
Sam Houston	5	–	13	.278	13	–	17	.433
Jacksonville State	4	–	14	.222	10	–	20	.333
UTEP	4	–	14	.222	11	–	19	.367
† 2025 CUSA tournament winner

The 2024–25 New Mexico State Aggies women's basketball team represented New Mexico State University during the 2024–25 NCAA Division I women's basketball season. The Aggies, who were led by third-year head coach Jody Adams, played their home games at the Pan American Center in Las Cruces, New Mexico, as second-year members of Conference USA.

== Previous season ==
The Aggies finished the 2023–24 season 13–18, 6–10 in C-USA play, to finish in a tie for sixth place. They upset FIU, before falling to Liberty in the semifinals of the C-USA tournament.

== Roster ==
2024–25 New Mexico State Aggies women's basketball team
Players
Coaches

Pos.	#	Name	Height	Year	Previous school	Hometown
G	1	Imani Warren	5 ft 10 in (1.78 m)	So	Rufus King High School	Milwaukee, Wisconsin
G	2	Loes Rozing	5 ft 10 in (1.78 m)	Sr	South Georgia Tech	Heiloo, Netherlands
G	3	Sianny Sanchez-Oliver	5 ft 5 in (1.65 m)	Sr	Delaware State	Powder Springs, Georgia
G	4	Jaila Harding	5 ft 8 in (1.73 m)	Sr	Butler Community College	Wichita, Kansas
G/F	5	Tylie Jones	6 ft 0 in (1.83 m)	Sr	College of Southern Idaho	Rigby, Idaho
G	6	Diarrah Sissoko (5Y)	5 ft 10 in (1.78 m)	Sr	Sam Houston	Bamako, Mali
G	7	Molly Kaiser	5 ft 8 in (1.73 m)	GS	Saginaw High School	Watauga, Texas
F	10	Fanta Gassama	6 ft 1 in (1.85 m)	Sr	South Georgia Tech	Mataró, Spain
G	11	Madi Gewirtz	5 ft 11 in (1.8 m)	Fr	Highland High School	Gilbert, Arizona
F	16	Marta Guilera	6 ft 1 in (1.85 m)	So	Georgian Court	La Granada, Spain
G	23	Sylena Peterson	5 ft 7 in (1.7 m)	Sr	Bonita Vista High School	San Diego, California
F	24	Lucía Yenes	6 ft 0 in (1.83 m)	Jr	Baloncesto Torrelodones	Madrid, Spain
F	25	Emma Dasovich	6 ft 0 in (1.83 m)	Fr	Valley Vista High School	Surprise, Arizona
F	27	Noah Garcia	6 ft 3 in (1.91 m)	Sr	Brandon	Madrid, Spain
G	30	Anna Csenyi	5 ft 9 in (1.75 m)	Jr	Casper College	Szolnok, Hungary

Head coach

- Jody Adams (Tennessee)

Assistant coach(es)

- James Frey (Troy)
- TaQuandra Mike (Wichita State)
- Preston Planells (Utah)

Legend

- (C) Team captain
- (S) Suspended
- (I) Ineligible
- (W) Walk-on
- (5Y) Fifth-year senior
- Injured
- Current redshirt

Roster
Last update: February 1, 2025

== Schedule and results ==
Date time, TV	Rank^{#}	Opponent^{#}	Result	Record	High points	High rebounds	High assists	Site (attendance) city, state
Exhibition
October 27, 2024*; 7:00 pm		Cameron	W 87–54	–	12 – Harding	6 – Rozing	6 – Kaiser	Pan American Center (202); Las Cruces, NM
Non-conference regular season
November 4, 2024*; 6:30 pm, ESPN+		at UC Irvine	W 57–49	1–0	22 – Gassama	16 – Gassama	3 – Gassama	Bren Events Center (511); Irvine, CA
November 7, 2024*; 6:00 pm, ESPN+		Utah Tech; C-USA/WAC Alliance	W 85–63	2–0	35 – Kaiser	14 – Gassama	4 – Peterson	Pan American Center (762); Las Cruces, NM
November 14, 2024*; 5:00 pm, ESPN+		UTSA	L 61–75	2–1	23 – Kaiser	9 – Gassama	4 – Kaiser	Pan American Center (812); Las Cruces, NM
November 20, 2024*; 6:00 pm, ESPN+		Western New Mexico	W 78–41	3–1	15 – Harding	9 – Gassama	3 – tied	Pan American Center (1,437); Las Cruces, NM
November 29, 2024*; 5:30 pm, FloHoops		vs. No. 5 Texas; Gulf Coast Showcase First Round	L 50–90	3–2	14 – Kaiser	3 – tied	2 – tied	Hertz Arena (332); Estero, FL
November 30, 2024*; 11:30 am, FloHoops		vs. Santa Clara; Gulf Coast Showcase Consolation 2nd Round	W 61–49	4–2	17 – Harding	8 – Gassama	7 – Sanchez-Oliver	Hertz Arena (245); Estero, FL
December 1, 2024*; 11:30 am, FloHoops		vs. Illinois State; Gulf Coast Showcase 5th Place Game	L 66–82	4–3	21 – Kaiser	5 – Kaiser	6 – Sanchez-Oliver	Hertz Arena (177); Estero, FL
December 6, 2024*; 7:00 pm, MWN		at New Mexico; Rio Grande Rivalry	W 81–71	5–3	25 – Kaiser	13 – Gassama	9 – Gassama	The Pit (4,880); Albuquerque, NM
December 8, 2024*; 2:00 pm, ESPN+		New Mexico; Rio Grande Rivalry	W 68–60	6–3	30 – Kaiser	13 – Gassama	6 – Gassama	Pan American Center (547); Las Cruces, NM
December 16, 2024*; 10:00 am, ESPN+		at Tarleton State; C-USA/WAC Alliance	L 55–65	6–4	19 – Kaiser	5 – Jones	3 – tied	Wisdom Gym (676); Stephenville, TX
December 18, 2024*; 5:30 pm, ESPN+		at No. 13 Kansas State	L 39–83	6–5	15 – Kaiser	6 – Rozing	3 – Harding	Bramlage Coliseum (3,547); Manhattan, KS
December 20, 2024*; 2:00 pm, ESPN+		Eastern New Mexico	W 77–46	7–5	21 – Kaiser	8 – Jones	4 – Jones	Pan American Center (438); Las Cruces, NM
December 29, 2024*; 3:00 pm, ESPN+		at No. 9 Oklahoma	L 64–82	7–6	24 – Kaiser	7 – Gassama	3 – tied	Lloyd Noble Center (6,876); Norman, OK
C-USA regular season
January 2, 2025; 5:30 pm, ESPN+		at Sam Houston	W 79–61	8–6 (1–0)	29 – Kaiser	10 – Gassama	2 – tied	Bernard Johnson Coliseum (456); Huntsville, TX
January 4, 2025; 1:00 pm, ESPN+		at Louisiana Tech	L 58–67	8–7 (1–1)	13 – Kaiser	10 – Gassama	4 – Gassama	Thomas Assembly Center (1,031); Ruston, LA
January 11, 2025; 2:00 pm, ESPN+		UTEP; Battle of I-10	W 65–49	9–7 (2–1)	32 – Kaiser	12 – Gassama	4 – Sanchez-Oliver	Pan American Center (896); Las Cruces, NM
January 16, 2025; 6:00 pm, ESPN+		FIU	W 74–50	10–7 (3–1)	28 – Kaiser	7 – Gassama	4 – Sanchez-Oliver	Pan American Center (482); Las Cruces, NM
January 18, 2025; 2:00 pm, ESPN+		Liberty	L 72–82	10–8 (3–2)	31 – Kaiser	7 – Gassama	3 – Kaiser	Pan American Center (593); Las Cruces, NM
January 23, 2025; 5:00 pm, ESPN+		at Kennesaw State	L 66–68	10–9 (3–3)	20 – Kaiser	12 – Gassama	4 – Kaiser	KSU Convocation Center (709); Kennesaw, GA
January 25, 2025; 12:30 pm, ESPN+		at Jacksonville State	L 56–60	10–10 (3–4)	19 – Kaiser	10 – Gassama	3 – Gassama	Pete Mathews Coliseum (880); Jacksonville, AL
January 30, 2025; 6:00 pm, ESPN+		Middle Tennessee	L 59–66 ^{OT}	10–11 (3–5)	19 – Kaiser	12 – Gassama	2 – tied	Pan American Center (366); Las Cruces, NM
February 1, 2025; 2:00 pm, ESPN+		Western Kentucky	W 64–59	11–11 (4–5)	17 – tied	9 – Gassama	4 – Kaiser	Pan American Center (397); Las Cruces, NM
February 8, 2025; 2:00 pm, ESPN+		at UTEP; Battle of I-10	W 85−60	12−11 (5−5)	30 – Kaiser	4 – Yenes	6 – Sanchez-Oliver	Don Haskins Center (1,664); El Paso, TX
February 13, 2025; 5:00 pm, ESPN+		at Liberty	L 58−63	12−12 (5−6)	25 – Kaiser	7 – Gewirtz	3 – tied	Liberty Arena (874); Lynchburg, VA
February 15, 2025; 11:00 am, ESPN+		at FIU	W 65−55	13−12 (6−6)	16 – Kaiser	7 – Gewirtz	6 – Sanchez-Oliver	Ocean Bank Convocation Center (608); Miami, FL
February 20, 2025; 6:00 pm, ESPN+		Jacksonville State	W 66−47	14−12 (7−6)	13 – tied	14 – Gassama	3 – tied	Pan American Center (412); Las Cruces, NM
February 22, 2025; 2:00 pm, ESPN+		Kennesaw State	W 61−57	15−12 (8−6)	22 – Kaiser	6 – Sanchez-Oliver	5 – Sanchez-Oliver	Pan American Center (478); Las Cruces, NM
February 27, 2025; 5:30 pm, ESPN+		at Middle Tennessee	L 41−63	15−13 (8−7)	10 – Gassama	11 – Gassama	1 – tied	Murphy Center (3,627); Murfreesboro, TN
March 1, 2025; 1:00 pm, ESPN+		at Western Kentucky	L 68−85	15−14 (8−8)	16 – Yenes	7 – Yenes	5 – tied	E. A. Diddle Arena (1,101); Bowling Green, KY
March 6, 2025; 6:00 pm, ESPN+		Louisiana Tech	W 87−80	16−14 (9−8)	35 – Kaiser	7 – Gassama	4 – Kaiser	Pan American Center (446); Las Cruces, NM
March 8, 2025; 2:00 pm, ESPN+		Sam Houston	W 64−56	17−14 (10−8)	20 – Kaiser	6 – tied	4 – Kaiser	Pan American Center (7,432); Las Cruces, NM
C-USA tournament
March 13, 2025; 10:30 am, ESPN+	(4)	vs. (5) Louisiana Tech; Quarterfinals	L 55–60	17–15	14 – Kaiser	13 – Gassama	3 – Sanchez-Oliver	Propst Arena (1,985); Huntsville, AL
WNIT
March 20, 2025*; 7:00 pm, ESPN+		at Pacific; First Round	W 54–49	18–15	13 – Peterson	11 – Gassama	4 – Rozing	Alex G. Spanos Center (516); Stockton, CA
March 24, 2025*; 6:00 pm		at North Dakota State; Second Round	L 65–68	18–16	22 – Gassama	8 – Gassama	3 – Gassama	Scheels Center (1,016); Fargo, ND
*Non-conference game. ^{#}Rankings from AP poll. (#) Tournament seedings in parentheses. All times are in Mountain.
