= 2024–25 Stephen F. Austin Ladyjacks basketball team =

American college basketball season

2024–25 Stephen F. Austin Ladyjacks basketball

Southland tournament champions

NCAA tournament, First Round
- Conference: Southland Conference
- Record: 29–6 (16–4 SLC)
- Head coach: Leonard Bishop (2nd season)
- Associate head coach: Steve Yang
- Assistant coaches: Jordynn Hernandez; Lexi Murphy
- Home arena: William R. Johnson Coliseum

2024–25 Southland Conference women's basketball standings
| | Conf. | | | | Overall |
| Team | W | | L | PCT | W | | L | PCT |
|---|---|---|---|---|---|---|---|---|
| Southeastern Louisiana | 19 | – | 1 | .950 | 26 | – | 6 | .813 |
| Lamar | 17 | – | 3 | .850 | 22 | – | 8 | .733 |
| Stephen F. Austin † | 16 | – | 4 | .800 | 29 | – | 6 | .829 |
| Incarnate Word | 12 | – | 8 | .600 | 18 | – | 14 | .563 |
| Northwestern State | 12 | – | 8 | .600 | 16 | – | 16 | .500 |
| UT Rio Grande Valley | 11 | – | 9 | .550 | 16 | – | 16 | .500 |
| Nicholls | 9 | – | 11 | .450 | 17 | – | 14 | .548 |
| Texas A&M–Corpus Christi | 7 | – | 13 | .350 | 15 | – | 17 | .469 |
| New Orleans | 5 | – | 15 | .250 | 5 | – | 24 | .172 |
| McNeese | 5 | – | 15 | .250 | 10 | – | 21 | .323 |
| East Texas A&M* | 4 | – | 16 | .200 | 7 | – | 22 | .241 |
| Houston Christian | 3 | – | 17 | .150 | 6 | – | 23 | .207 |
† 2025 Southland tournament winner * ineligible for the 2025 NCAA tournament due to transition from Division II

The 2024–25 Stephen F. Austin Ladyjacks basketball team represented Stephen F. Austin State University during the 2024–25 NCAA Division I women's basketball season. The Ladyjacks, who were led by second-year head coach Leonard Bishop, played their home games at the William R. Johnson Coliseum in Nacogdoches, Texas, as members of the Southland Conference (SLC). The season marks the Ladyjacks' return from the Western Athletic Conference, as they rejoined the Southland Conference after a three-year absence.

== Preseason polls ==
=== Southland Conference Poll ===
The Southland Conference released its preseason poll on October 17, 2024. Receiving 193 overall votes, the Ladyjacks were picked to finish fourth in the conference.

| Predicted finish | Team | Votes (1st place) |
|---|---|---|
| 1 | Lamar | 236 (19) |
| 2 | Southeastern Louisiana | 213 (5) |
| 3 | Texas A&M–Corpus Christi | 200 |
| 4 | Stephen F. Austin | 193 |
| 5 | Incarnate Word | 149 |
| 6 | Texas A&M–Commerce (renamed) | 112 |
| 7 | Nicholls | 108 |
| 8 | New Orleans | 109 |
| 9 | UT Rio Grande Valley | 92 |
| 10 | Northwestern State | 67 |
| 11 | McNeese | 61 |
| 12 | Houston Christian | 51 |

=== Preseason All-Conference ===
Ashlyn Traylor-Walker was selected to the second-team Preseason All-Conference team.

== Roster ==
2024–25 Stephen F. Austin Ladyjacks women's basketball team
Players
Coaches

| Pos. | # | Name | Height | Year | Previous school | Hometown |
|---|---|---|---|---|---|---|
| G | 0 | Hope LeMelle | 5 ft 7 in (1.7 m) | Sr | Liberty | Dallas, Texas |
| G | 1 | Harmanie Dominguez | 5 ft 6 in (1.68 m) | Jr | Adams State | Las Cruces, New Mexico |
| G | 3 | Avery VanSickle | 5 ft 10 in (1.78 m) | Jr | Regis Jesuit High School | Denver, Colorado |
| G | 4 | Ashlyn Traylor-Walker | 5 ft 8 in (1.73 m) | Jr | Radford | Franklin, Indiana |
| G | 5 | Key Roseby | 6 ft 0 in (1.83 m) | Fr | Frisco Liberty High School | Frisco, Texas |
| G | 11 | Lydia Cooke-Wiggins | 5 ft 6 in (1.68 m) | So | John Paul II High School | Dallas, Texas |
| G | 12 | Faith Blackstone | 6 ft 0 in (1.83 m) | GS | CCBC Essex | Harrisburg, Pennsylvania |
| C | 13 | Ituau Tuisaula | 6 ft 1 in (1.85 m) | Sr | Peninsula College | Soldotna, Alaska |
| G | 15 | Mimi Gatewood | 5 ft 6 in (1.68 m) | Jr | Kansas State | DeSoto, Texas |
| F | 20 | Cha Gardner | 6 ft 3 in (1.91 m) | Fr | Newark Valley High School | Newark Valley, New York |
| F | 33 | Trinity Moore | 6 ft 0 in (1.83 m) | Sr | Oral Roberts | Oklahoma City, Oklahoma |

Head coach

- Leonard Bishop (East Texas A&M)

Assistant coach(es)

- Steve Yang (Missouri State)
- Jordynn Hernandez (UT Arlington)
- Lexi Murphy (Angelo State)

Legend

- (C) Team captain
- (S) Suspended
- (I) Ineligible
- (W) Walk-on
- Injured
- Current redshirt

Roster
Last update: March 2, 2025

== Schedule and results ==
| Date time, TV | Rank^{#} | Opponent^{#} | Result | Record | High points | High rebounds | High assists | Site (attendance) city, state |
Regular season
| November 4, 2024*; 5:00 p.m., ESPN+ | | Texas Southern | W 86–45 | 1–0 | 18 – F. Blackstone | 10 – K. Roseby | 5 – A. Traylor-Walker | William R. Johnson Coliseum (983); Nacogdoches, TX |
| November 12, 2024*; 11:00 a.m., ESPN+ | | at Abilene Christian | W 68–65 | 2–0 | 23 – A. VanSickle | 6 – F. Blackstone | 3 – A. VanSickle | Moody Coliseum (2,207); Abilene, TX |
| November 16, 2024*; 7:00 p.m., ESPN+ | | Louisiana Tech | W 70–56 | 3–0 | 17 – F. Blackstone | 7 – F. Blackstone | 6 – A. Traylor-Walker | William R. Johnson Coliseum (1,031); Nacogdoches, TX |
| November 19, 2024*; 6:30 p.m., ESPN+ | | Wiley | W 104–40 | 4–0 | 19 – K. Roseby | 12 – K. Roseby | 5 – A. VanSickle | William R. Johnson Coliseum (875); Nacogdoches, TX |
| November 22, 2024*; 7:00 p.m., ESPN+ | | at Texas State | W 79–60 | 5–0 | 18 – A. VanSickle | 7 – H. Dominguez | 5 – H. Dominguez | Strahan Arena (753); San Marcos, TX |
| November 29, 2024*; 2:30 p.m. | | vs. Samford; UNF Thanksgiving Tournament | W 90–66 | 6–0 | 19 – A. VanSickle | 7 – A. VanSickle | 5 – A. VanSickle | UNF Arena (110); Jacksonville, FL |
| November 30, 2024*; 2:30 p.m. | | vs. Coppin State; UNF Thanksgiving Tournament | W 81–60 | 7–0 | 17 – T. Moore | 7 – F. Blackstone | 4 – T. Moore | UNF Arena (102); Jacksonville, FL |
| December 3, 2024*; 6:00 p.m., ESPN+ | | at Texas Tech | L 68–78 | 7–1 | 24 – F. Blackstone | 6 – I. Tuisaula | 5 – A. Traylor-Walker | United Supermarkets Arena (4,231); Lubbock, TX |
| December 7, 2024; 2:00 p.m., ESPN+ | | at UT Rio Grande Valley | L 72–78 | 7–2 | 18 – A. Traylor-Walker | 6 – T. Moore | 5 – A. Traylor-Walker | UTRGV Fieldhouse (418); Edinburg, TX |
| December 14, 2024; 1:00 p.m., ESPN+ | | at Texas A&M–Corpus Christi | W 66–59 | 8–2 (1–1) | 19 – A. VanSickle | 9 – T. Moore | 5 – A. Traylor-Walker | American Bank Center (758); Corpus Christi, TX |
| December 19, 2024*; 3:00 p.m., ESPN+ | | at San Diego State; San Diego Classic | W 89–80 ^{2OT} | 9–2 | 26 – F. Blackstone | 9 – T. Moore | 3 – F. Blackstone | Viejas Arena (724); San Diego, CA |
| December 21, 2024*; 3:00 p.m., ESPN+ | | vs. Colorado State; San Diego Classic | W 80–69 | 10–2 | 27 – A. Traylor-Walker | 12 – A. Traylor-Walker | 7 – A. VanSickle | Viejas Arena; San Diego, CA |
| December 29, 2024*; 2:00 p.m., ESPN+ | | Texas A&M–San Antonio | W 113–39 | 11–2 | 31 – A. VanSickle | 15 – T. Moore | 9 – A. Traylor-Walker | William R. Johnson Coliseum (1,107); Nacogdoches, TX |
| January 2, 2025; 6:30 p.m., ESPN+ | | Houston Christian | W 82–35 | 12–2 (2–1) | 15 – H. Dominguez | 8 – F. Blackstone | 7 – A. Traylor-Walker | William R. Johnson Coliseum (857); Nacogdoches, TX |
| January 4, 2025; 2:00 p.m., ESPN+ | | Incarnate Word | W 67–60 | 13–2 (3–1) | 18 – F. Blackstone | 11 – F. Blackstone | 6 – A. Traylor-White | William R. Johnson Coliseum (996); Nacogdoches, TX |
| January 9, 2025; 6:30 p.m., ESPN+ | | Southeastern Louisiana | L 81–87 | 13–3 (3–2) | 20 – T. Moore | 10 – F. Blackstone | 4 – K. Roseby | William R. Johnson Coliseum (853); Nacogdoches, TX |
| January 11, 2025; 3:00 p.m., ESPN+ | | at Lamar | L 74–77 | 4–13 (3–3) | 17 – A. Traylor-Walker | 7 – K. Roseby | 8 – A. Traylor-Walker | Neches Arena; Beaumont, TX |
| January 16, 2025; 6:00 p.m., ESPN+ | | at McNeese | W 91–49 | 14–4 (4–3) | 22 – A. Traylor-Walker | 11 – A. Traylor-Walker | 4 – H. Dominguez | The Legacy Center (1,406); Lake Charles, LA |
| January 18, 2025; 1:00 p.m., ESPN+ | | at Nicholls | L 71–75 | 14–5 (4–4) | 14 – F. Blackstone | 7 – H. LeMelle | 4 – A. Traylor-Walker | Stopher Gymnasium (411); Thibodaux, LA |
| January 25, 2025; 2:00 p.m., ESPN+ | | Northwestern State | W 67–65 | 15–5 (5–4) | 18 – T. Moore | 9 – A. Traylor-Walker | 4 – A. VanSickle | William R. Johnson Coliseum (1,213); Nacogdoches, TX |
| January 27, 2025; 5:00 p.m., ESPN+ | | East Texas A&M | W 92–65 | 16–5 (6–4) | 17 – H. Dominguez | 9 – K. Roseby | 8 – A. Traylor-Walker | William R. Johnson Coliseum (945); Nacogdoches, TX |
| January 30, 2025; 6:30 p.m., ESPN+ | | at New Orleans | W 83–65 | 17–5 (7–4) | 18 – A. Traylor-Walker | 12 – T. Moore | 5 – K. Roseby | Lakefront Arena (389); New Orleans, LA |
| February 1, 2025; 5:00 p.m., ESPN+ | | Lamar | W 72–66 | 18–5 (8–4) | 20 – F. Blackstone | 7 – T. Moore | 4 – A. Traylor-Walker | William R. Johnson Coliseum (1,113); Nacogdoches, TX |
| February 6, 2025; 6:30 p.m., ESPN+ | | UT Rio Grande Valley | W 87–67 | 19–5 (9–4) | 28 – H. Dominguez | 10 – C. Gardner | 10 – A. Traylor-Walker | William R. Johnson Coliseum (1,195); Nacogdoches, TX |
| February 8, 2025; 2:00 p.m., ESPN+ | | Texas A&M–Corpus Christi | W 74–56 | 20–5 (10–4) | 22 – F. Blackstone | 17 – T. Moore | 6 – A. Traylor-Walker | William R. Johnson Coliseum (1,170); Nacogdoches, TX |
| February 13, 2025; 6:30 p.m., ESPN+ | | at East Texas A&M | W 71–55 | 21–5 (11–4) | 20 – F. Blackstone | 11 – F. Blackstone | 9 – A. Traylor-Walker | The Field House (502); Commerce, TX |
| February 15, 2025; 1:00 p.m., ESPN+ | | at Northwestern State | W 68–66 | 22–5 (12–4) | 26 – A. Traylor-Walker | 7 – T. Moore | 4 – A. Traylor-Walker | Prather Coliseum (607); Natchitoches, LA |
| February 20, 2025; 6:00 p.m., ESPN+ | | at Houston Christian | W 66–59 | 23–5 (13–4) | 20 – C. Gardner | 10 – C. Gardner | 5 – A Traylor-Walker | Sharp Gymnasium (349); Houston, TX |
| February 22, 2025; 1:00 p.m., ESPN+ | | at Incarnate Word | W 73–68 | 24–5 (14–4) | 17 – F. Blackstone | 12 – T. Moore | 5 – A. Traylor-Walker | McDermott Center (191); San Antonio, TX |
| February 27, 2025; 6:30 p.m., ESPN+ | | McNeese | W 80–57 | 25–5 (15–4) | 18 – K. Roseby | 11 – K. Roseby | 3 – F. Blackstone | William R. Johnson Coliseum (1,172); Nacogdoches, TX |
| March 1, 2025; 2:00 p.m., ESPN+ | | Nicholls | W 79–56 | 26–5 (16–4) | 17 – F. Blackstone | 11 – T. Moore | 5 – F. Blackstone | William R. Johnson Coliseum (978); Nacogdoches, TX |
Postseason (3–0)
2025 Jersey Mike's Subs Southland Conference Tournament (3–0)
| Mar 11, 2025; 1:30 pm, ESPN+ | (3) | vs. (7) Nicholls; Quarterfinals | W 77–65 | 27–5 (1–0) | 17 – H. Dominguez | 10 – F. Blackstone | 5 – A. Traylor-Walker | The Legacy Center (832); Lake Charles, LA |
| Mar 12, 2025; 1:00 pm, ESPN+ | (3) | vs. (2) Lamar; Semifinals | W 61–53 | 28–5 (2–0) | 18 – T. Moore | 7 – Tied | 6 – A. Traylor-Walker | The Legacy Center (1,000); Lake Charles, LA |
| Mar 13, 2025; 4:00 pm, ESPNU | (3) | vs. (1) Southeastern Louisiana; Championship | W 65–57 | 29–5 (3–0) | 14 – T. Moore | 10 – T. Moore | 4 – A. Traylor-Walker | The Legacy Center (1,311); Lake Charles, LA |
2025 NCAA Tournament – Birmingham Regional 3
| Mar 21, 2025; 2:00 pm, ESPN | (14 B3) | vs. (3 B3) No. 8 Notre Dame; Round of 64 | L 54–106 | 29–6 | – | – | – | Purcell Pavilion (7,542); Notre Dame, IN |
*Non-conference game. ^{#}Rankings from AP poll. (#) Tournament seedings in parentheses. All times are in Central.

== Conference awards and honors ==
=== Weekly awards ===
Weekly honors
| Honors | Player | Position | Date Awarded | Ref. |
|---|---|---|---|---|
| SLC Women's Basketball Player of the Week | Faith Blackstone | G | February 3, 2025 | |
| SLC Women's Basketball Player of the Week | Ashlyn Traylor-Walker | G | February 17, 2025 | |

== See also ==
2024–25 Stephen F. Austin Lumberjacks basketball team
