= 2025 Southland Conference women's basketball tournament =

- Classification: Division I
- Season: 2024–25
- Teams: 8
- Site: The Legacy Center; Lake Charles, Louisiana
- Champions: Stephen F. Austin (17th title)
- Winning coach: Leonard Bishop (1st title)
- MVP: Trinity Moore (Stephen F. Austin)
- Attendance: 3,780 (total); 1,311 (championship)
- Television: ESPN+, ESPNU

2024–25 Southland Conference women's basketball standings
	Conf.				Overall
Team	W		L	PCT	W		L	PCT
Southeastern Louisiana	19	–	1	.950	26	–	6	.813
Lamar	17	–	3	.850	22	–	8	.733
Stephen F. Austin †	16	–	4	.800	29	–	6	.829
Incarnate Word	12	–	8	.600	18	–	14	.563
Northwestern State	12	–	8	.600	16	–	16	.500
UT Rio Grande Valley	11	–	9	.550	16	–	16	.500
Nicholls	9	–	11	.450	17	–	14	.548
Texas A&M–Corpus Christi	7	–	13	.350	15	–	17	.469
New Orleans	5	–	15	.250	5	–	24	.172
McNeese	5	–	15	.250	10	–	21	.323
East Texas A&M*	4	–	16	.200	7	–	22	.241
Houston Christian	3	–	17	.150	6	–	23	.207
† 2025 Southland tournament winner * ineligible for the 2025 NCAA tournament due to transition from Division II

The 2025 Southland Conference women's basketball tournament was the postseason women's basketball tournament for the 2024–25 season of the Southland Conference. The tournament was held March 10–13, 2025, at The Legacy Center in Lake Charles, Louisiana. The tournament winner, Stephen F. Austin received the conference's automatic invitation to the 2025 NCAA Division I women's basketball tournament.

== Seeds ==
Teams were seeded by record within the conference, with a tie–breaker system to seed teams with identical conference records. Eight teams in the conference qualify for the tournament. The top two seeds received double byes into the semifinals in the merit-based format. The No. 3 and No. 4 seeds receive single byes to the quarterfinals. Tiebreakers used were 1) Head-to-head results, 2) comparison of records against individual teams in the conference starting with the top-ranked team(s) and working down and 3) NCAA NET rankings available on day following the conclusion of regular-season play.

Seed	School	Conference	Tiebreaker 1	Tiebreaker 2
1	Southeastern Louisiana	19–1		
2	Lamar	17–3		
3	Stephen F. Austin	16–4		
4	Incarnate Word	12–8	2–0 vs. Northwestern State	
5	Northwestern State	12–8	0–2 vs. Incarnate Word	
6	UT Rio Grande Valley	11–9		
7	Nicholls	9–11		
8	Texas A&M–Corpus Christi	7–13		
DNQ	New Orleans	5–15	1–1 vs. McNeese	1–1 vs. UT Rio Grande Valley
DNQ	McNeese	5–15	1–1 vs. New Orleans	0–2 vs. UT Rio Grande Valley
DNQ	East Texas A&M	4–16		
DNQ	Houston Christian	3–17		

== Schedule ==
Session	Game	Time*	Matchup^{#}	Score	Television	Attendance
First round – Monday, March 10, 2025
1	1	11:00 am	No. 5 Northwestern State vs. No. 8 Texas A&M–Corpus Christi	66–63	ESPN+	637
1	2	1:30 pm	No. 6 UT Rio Grande Valley vs. No. 7 Nicholls	53–55	ESPN+	637
Quarterfinals – Tuesday, March 11, 2025
2	3	11:00 am	No. 4 Incarnate Word vs. No. 5 Northwestern State	69–54	ESPN+	832
2	4	1:30 pm	No. 3 Stephen F. Austin vs. No. 7 Nicholls	77–65	ESPN+	832
Semifinals – Wednesday, March 12, 2025
3	5	10:30 am	No. 1 Southeastern Louisiana vs. No. 4 Incarnate Word	57–37	ESPN+	1,000
3	6	1:30 pm	No. 2 Lamar vs. No. 3 Stephen F. Austin	53–61	ESPN+	1,000
Championship – Thursday, March 13, 2025
4	7	4:00 pm	No. 1 Southeastern Louisiana vs. No. 3 Stephen F. Austin	57–65	ESPNU	1,311
*Game times in CDT. #-Rankings denote tournament seeding.

== Bracket ==
First round Monday, March 10; ESPN+
5	Northwestern State	66
8	Texas A&M–Corpus Christi	63
6	UT Rio Grande Valley	53
7	Nicholls	55

Quarterfinals; Tuesday, March 11; ESPN+
4	Incarnate Word	69
5	Northwestern State	54
3	Stephen F. Austin	77
7	Nicholls	65

Semifinals; Wednesday, March 12; ESPN+
1	Southeastern Louisiana	57
4	Incarnate Word	37
2	Lamar	53
3	Stephen F. Austin	61

Championship; Thursday, March 13; ESPNU
1	Southeastern Louisiana	57
3	Stephen F. Austin	65

* denotes number of overtime periods

=== First round ===
ESPN+

March 10
11:00 am

No. 5 Northwestern State 66, No. 8 Texas A&M–Corpus Christi 63
Scoring by quarter: 21–11, 5–13, 18–15, 22–24
Pts: S. Ayres – 21; Rebs: S. Ayres – 9 Asts: M. Blake – 2	Pts: P. Allen – 19; Rebs: P. Allen – 6 Asts: T. Criswell – 4
Northwestern State advances to Southland Quarterfinals

The Legacy Center – Lake Charles, LA
Attendance:
Referees: John Fletcher, LaShonda Kidd and Jaclyn Watson

ESPN+

March 10
1:30 pm

No. 6 UT Rio Grande Valley 53, No. 7 Nicholls 55
Scoring by quarter: 9–10, 16–9, 11–19, 17–17
Pts: K. Hackerott – 15; Rebs: C. O'Keefe – 11; Asts: Tied – 2	Pts: D. Brister – 17; Rebs: E. Garnett – 12; Asts: J. Jalomo – 2
Nicholls advances to Southland Quarterfinals

The Legacy Center – Lake Charles, LA
Attendance: 637
Referees: Ed Collopy, Metta Christensen and Tiffany Bridges

=== Quarterfinals ===
ESPN+

March 11
11:00 am

No. 4 Incarnate Word 69, No. 5 Northwestern State 54
Scoring by quarter: 14–11, 21–14, 15–17, 19–12
Pts: D. Norris – 14; Rebs: R. McCrary - 11; Asts: J. Elliott - 5	Pts: M. Blake - 29; Rebs: Tied - 8 Asts: C. Celaya - 3
Incarnate Word advances to Southland Semifinals

The Legacy Center – Lake Charles, LA
Referees: Britton Sherry, Jennifer White, and Tiffany Bridges

ESPN+

March 11
1:30 pm

No. 3 Stephen F. Austin 77, No. 7 Nicholls 65
Scoring by quarter: 20–13, 20–17, 19–22, 18–13
Pts: H. Dominguez – 17; Rebs: F. Blackstone – 10; Asts: A. Tralor-Walker – 5	Pts: D. Brister – 17; Rebs: D. Brister – 7 Asts: E. Garnett – 7
Stephen F. Austin advances to Southland Semifinals

The Legacy Center – Lake Charles, LA
Attendance: 832
Referees: Travis Jones, LaShonda Kidd, and Jaclyn Watson

=== Semifinals ===
ESPNU

March 12
10:30 am

No. 1 Southeastern Louisiana 57, No. 4 Incarnate Word 37
Scoring by quarter: 11–6, 17–9, 17–10, 12–12
Pts: Tied – 12; Rebs: L. Alexander – 10; Asts: Tied – 3	Pts: J. Elliott – 12; Rebs: Tied – 5 Asts: Tied-5 – 1
Southeastern Louisiana advances to Championship game.

The Legacy Center – Lake Charles, LA
Referees: Chaney Muench, D'Lynn Schertz, and Tommi Pari

ESPN+

March 12
1:30 pm

No. 2 Lamar 53, No. 3 Stephen F. Austin 61
Scoring by quarter: 11–16, 18–13, 15–13, 9–19
Pts: A. Davis – 18; Rebs: A. Davis – 12; Asts: R. Taylor – 6	Pts: T. Moore – 18; Rebs: Tied – 7 Asts: A. Traylor-Waker – 6
Stephen F. Austin advances to Championship game.

The Legacy Center – Lake Charles, LA
Attendance: 1,000
Referees: Britton Sherry, Jennifer White, and Demoya Pugh

=== Championship ===
ESPNU

March 13
4:00 pm

No. 1 Southeastern Louisiana 57, No. 3 Stephen F. Austin 65
Scoring by quarter: 17–18, 15–11, 7–14, 18–22
Pts: Tied – 13; Rebs: L. Alexander – 10; Asts: J. Pierre – 3	Pts: T. Moore – 14; Rebs: T. Moore – 10; Asts: A. Traylor-Walker – 4
Stephen F. Austin wins Southland Championship

The Legacy Center – Lake Charles, LA
Attendance: 1,311
Referees: Chaney Muench, Travis Jones, and Demoya Pugh

== Awards and honors ==
2025 Southland Conference Women's Basketball All-Tournament Team
- Trinity Moore, Stephen F. Austin (MVP)
- Ashlyn Traylor-Walker, Stephen F. Austin
- Alexius Horne, Southeastern Louisiana
- Jalencia Pierre, Southeastern Louisiana
- Akasha Davis, Lamar

== See also ==
2025 Southland Conference men's basketball tournament
