= 2024–25 McNeese Cowgirls basketball team =

Intercollegiate basketball season

2024–25 McNeese Cowgirls basketball
- Conference: Southland Conference
- Record: 10–21 (5–15 Southland)
- Head coach: Lynn Kennedy (4th season)
- Associate head coach: Mike Pittman
- Assistant coaches: Sydney Schultz; Kylie Jimenez; Le'Shenae Stubblefield
- Home arena: The Legacy Center (Capacity: 4,200)

2024–25 Southland Conference women's basketball standings
	Conf.				Overall
Team	W		L	PCT	W		L	PCT
Southeastern Louisiana	19	–	1	.950	26	–	6	.813
Lamar	17	–	3	.850	22	–	8	.733
Stephen F. Austin †	16	–	4	.800	29	–	6	.829
Incarnate Word	12	–	8	.600	18	–	14	.563
Northwestern State	12	–	8	.600	16	–	16	.500
UT Rio Grande Valley	11	–	9	.550	16	–	16	.500
Nicholls	9	–	11	.450	17	–	14	.548
Texas A&M–Corpus Christi	7	–	13	.350	15	–	17	.469
New Orleans	5	–	15	.250	5	–	24	.172
McNeese	5	–	15	.250	10	–	21	.323
East Texas A&M*	4	–	16	.200	7	–	22	.241
Houston Christian	3	–	17	.150	6	–	23	.207
† 2025 Southland tournament winner * ineligible for the 2025 NCAA tournament due to transition from Division II

The 2024–25 McNeese Cowgirls basketball team represented McNeese State University during the 2024–25 NCAA Division I women's basketball season. The Cowgirls, led by fourth-year head coach Lynn Kennedy, played their home games at The Legacy Center located on the university campus in Lake Charles, Louisiana as members of the Southland Conference. The Cowgirls finished the 2024–25 season 10–21, 5–15 in conference play to finish in a two way tie for ninth place. Failing to qualify for the SLC tournament, the Cowgirls' season ended with a 71–73 loss to New Orleans.

== Media ==
Home games are broadcast on ESPN+.

== Preseason polls ==
=== Southland Conference Poll ===
The Southland Conference released its preseason poll on October 17, 2024. Receiving 61 overall votes, the Cowgirls were picked to finish eleventh in the conference.

Predicted finish	Team	Votes (1st place)
1	Lamar	236 (19)
2	Southeastern Louisiana	213 (5)
3	Texas A&M–Corpus Christi	200
4	Stephen F. Austin	193
5	Incarnate Word	149
6	Texas A&M–Commerce (renamed)	112
7	Nicholls	108
8	New Orleans	109
9	UT Rio Grande Valley	92
10	Northwestern State	67
11	McNeese	61
12	Houston Christian	51

=== Preseason All Conference ===
No Cowgirls were selected to a Preseason All-Conference team.

== Roster ==
2024–25 McNeese Cowgirls women's basketball team
Players
Coaches

Pos.	#	Name	Height	Year	Previous school	Hometown
G	1	Azjah Reeves	5 ft 8 in (1.73 m)	So	Harding Prep	Oklahoma City, Oklahoma
F	2	Julia Puente	6 ft 2 in (1.88 m)	Jr	Murray State	Barcelona, Spain
G	4	Paris Guillory	5 ft 7 in (1.7 m)	So	Louisiana Tech	Lake Charles, Louisiana
G	6	Avery Young	5 ft 7 in (1.7 m)	Jr	Pearl River Community College	Iota, Louisiana
G	7	Tyrielle Williams	5 ft 7 in (1.7 m)	Jr	South Alabama	New Orleans, Louisiana
F	12	Alva Mofalk	6 ft 4 in (1.93 m)	So	Luleå Academy	Luleå, Sweden
G	13	Lyla Kahrimanovic	5 ft 11 in (1.8 m)	Fr	Woodinville High School	Woodinville, Washington
G	14	Mireia Yespes	6 ft 2 in (1.88 m)	Sr	Cirvianum De Torrello` Institute	Barcelona, Spain
C	20	Sydney McQuietor	6 ft 2 in (1.88 m)	Sr	Boise State	Keller, Texas
G	21	Boston Berry	5 ft 7 in (1.7 m)	So	Jones High School	Jones, Oklahoma
F	22	Kiayra Ellis	6 ft 0 in (1.83 m)	Sr	Arkansas State	Shreveport, Louisiana
C	35	Wilnie Joseph	6 ft 5 in (1.96 m)	Sr	Louisiana	Greenwood, Indiana
G	41	Kyla Davis	5 ft 9 in (1.75 m)	Sr	New Orleans	Fort Worth, Texas
F	44	Daniela Vallecilla	6 ft 4 in (1.93 m)	RS Fr	Cypress Ranch High School	Houston, Texas

Head coach

- Lynn Kennedy (Bushnell)

Assistant coach(es)

- Mike Pittman (Grambling State)
- Sydney Schultz (Portland State)
- Kylie Jimenez (Portland State)
- Le'Shenae Stubblefield (McNeese State)

Legend

- (C) Team captain
- (S) Suspended
- (I) Ineligible
- (W) Walk-on
- Injured
- Current redshirt

Roster
Last update: March 3, 2025

== Schedule ==
Date time, TV	Rank^{#}	Opponent^{#}	Result	Record	High points	High rebounds	High assists	Site (attendance) city, state
Non-conference regular season
November 4, 2024*; 11:00 a.m., ESPN+		Southeastern Baptist	W 99–19	1–0	17 – L. Kahrimanovic	7 – L. Kahrimanovic	4 – L. Kahrimanovic	The Legacy Center (2,220); Lake Charles, LA
November 7, 2024*; 5:00 p.m., ESPN+		Biblical Studies	W 105–35	2–0	15 – A. Reeves	7 – B. Berry	6 – B. Berry	The Legacy Center (2,589); Lake Charles, LA
November 10, 2024*; 1:00 p.m., ESPN+		North American	W 77–52	3–0	14 – M. Yespes	9 – M. Yespes	4 – T. Williams	The Legacy Center (2,303); Lake Charles, LA
November 18, 2024*; 8:00 p.m., ESPN+		at Utah	L 50–118	3–1	11 – A. Reeves	8 – M. Yespes	2 – A. Reeves	Jon M. Huntsman Center (3,129); Salt Lake City, UT
November 19, 2024*; 8:00 p.m., ESPN+		at BYU	L 64–85	3–2	20 – K. Ellis	6 – S. McQuietor	5 – T. Williams	Marriott Center (1,488); Provo, UT
November 23, 2024*; 1:00 p.m., ESPN+		Utah Tech	L 69–79	3–3	16 – K. Davis	10 – M. Yespes	6 – T. Williams	The Legacy Center (2,430); Lake Charles, LA
November 27, 2024*; 5:30 p.m., ESPN+		St. Thomas (TX)	W 81–43	4–3	15 – B. Berry	11 – M. Yespes	3 – B. Berry	The Legacy Center (2,382); Lake Charles, LA
December 6, 2024*; 1:00 p.m., ESPN+		vs. William & Mary; Shirley Duncan Classic	L 48–57	4–4	12 – L. Kahrimanovic	10 – M. Yespes	2 – T. Williams	Joan Perry Brock Center; Farmville, VA
December 7, 2024*; 5:00 p.m., ESPN+		vs. South Carolina State; Shirley Duncan Classic	W 62–38	5–4	15 – L. Kahrimanovic	11 – M. Yespes	5 – T. Williams	Joan Perry Brock Center; Farmville, VA
December 8, 2024*; 1:30 p.m., ESPN+		at Longwood; Shirley Duncan Classic	L 54–81	5–5	12 – P. Guillory	5 – M. Yespes	4 – M. Yespes	Joan Perry Brock Center; Farmville, VA
December 16, 2024*; 6:30 p.m., ESPN+		at Oklahoma State	L 41–92	5–6	15 – P. Guillory	5 – W. Joseph	3 – L. Kahrimanovic	Gallagher-Iba Arena (2,020); Stillwater, OK
Conference regular season
December 21, 2024; 1:00 p.m., ESPN+		Southeastern Louisiana	L 56–82	5–7 (0–1)	13 – P. Guillory	10 – M. Yespes	5 – T. Williams	The Legacy Center (2,437); Lake Charles, LA
January 2, 2025; 6:30 p.m., ESPN+		at Northwestern State	L 55–70	5–8 (0–2)	26 – P. Guillory	8 – P. Guillory	2 – K. Ellis	Prather Coliseum (351); Natchitoches, LA
January 4, 2025; 12:00 p.m., ESPN+		at East Texas A&M	W 64–55	6–8 (1–2)	17 – P. Guillory	14 – M. Yespes	6 – T. Williams	The Field House (367); Commerce, TX
January 9, 2025; 6:00 p.m., ESPN+		at Houston Christian	W 61–51	7–8 (2–2)	19 – P. Guillory	11 – W. Joseph	6 – T. Williams	Sharp Gymnasium (222); Houston, TX
January 11, 2025; 1:00 p.m., ESPN+		Nicholls	L 47–60	7–9 (2–3)	122 – P. Guillory	8 – M. Yespes	2 – A. Reeves	The Legacy Center (2,568); Lake Charles, LA
January 16, 2025; 6:00 p.m., ESPN+		Stephen F. Austin	L 49–91	7–10 (2–4)	11 – P. Guillory	13 – M. Yespes	3 – T. Williams	The Legacy Center (1,406); Lake Charles, LA
January 18, 2025; 1:00 p.m., ESPN+		Lamar; Battle of the Border	L 52–68	7–11 (2–5)	22 – P. Guillory	7 – W. Joseph	3 – T. Williams	The Legacy Center (2,123); Lake Charles, LA
January 25, 2025; 2:00 p.m., ESPN+		at UT Rio Grande Valley	L 65–73	7–12 (2–6)	17 – K. Ellis	8 – K. Ellis	4 – A. Reeves	UTRGV Fieldhouse (808); Edinburg, TX
January 27, 2025; 4:30 p.m., ESPN+		at Texas A&M–Corpus Christi	W 59–54	8–12 (3–6)	18 – P. Guillory	11 – S. McQuietor	2 – B. Berry	American Bank Center (1,258); Corpus Christi, TX
January 30, 2025; 6:00 p.m., ESPN+		Incarnate Word	L 63–77	8–13 (3–7)	21 – K. Ellis	6 – K. Ellis	4 – T. Williams	The Legacy Center (1,342); Lake Charles, LA
February 1, 2025; 6:00 p.m., ESPN+		at Nicholls	L 67–84	8–14 (3–8)	17 – P. Guillory	6 – T. Williams	3 – A. Reeves	Stopher Gymnasium (412); Thibodaux, LA
February 6, 2025; 6:00 p.m., ESPN+		East Texas A&M	L 51–67	8–15 (3–9)	13 – P. Guillory	11 – W. Joseph	3 – T. Williams	The Legacy Center (2,378); Lake Charles, LA
February 8, 2025; 1:00 p.m., ESPN+		Northwestern State	L 56–80	8–16 (3–10)	14 – K. Ellis	7 – K. Ellis	2 – K. Davis	The Legacy Center (1,235); Lake Charles, LA
February 13, 2025; 6:00 p.m., ESPN+		at Southeastern Louisiana	L 45–65	8–17 (3–11)	10 – B. Berry	8 – B. Berry	2 – T. Williams	Pride Roofing University Center (1,010); Hammond, LA
February 15, 2025; 2:00 p.m., ESPN+		at New Orleans	W 71–66	9–7 (4–11)	18 – K. Ellis	9 – K. Ellis	4 – B. Berry	Lakefront Arena (372); New Orleans, LA
February 20, 2025; 6:00 p.m., ESPN+		UT Rio Grande Valley	L 44–67	9–18 (4–12)	11 – B. Berry	7 – K. Davis	3 – A. Young	The Legacy Center (1,446); Lake Charles, LA
February 22, 2025; 1:00 p.m., ESPN+		Texas A&M–Corpus Christi	W 69–60	10–18 (5–12)	21 – M. Yespes	11 – M. Yespes	7 – K. Ellis	The Legacy Center (2,658); Lake Charles, LA
February 27, 2025; 6:30 p.m., ESPN+		at Stephen F. Austin	L 57–80	10–19 (5–13)	13 – A. Reeves	5 – A. Reeves	4 – A. Reeves	William R. Johnson Coliseum (1,172); Nacogdoches, TX
March 1, 2025; 3:00 p.m., ESPN+		at Lamar; Battle of the Border	L 60–69	10–20 (5–14)	15 – T. Williams	9 – W. Joseph	3 – T. Williams	Neches Arena; Beaumont, TX
March 4, 2025; 1:00 p.m., ESPN+		New Orleans	L 71–73	10–21 (5–15)	16 – K. Ellis	8 – T. Williams	3 – K. Ellis	The Legacy Center (1,394); Lake Charles, LA
*Non-conference game. ^{#}Rankings from AP poll. (#) Tournament seedings in parentheses. All times are in Central.

== See also ==
- 2024–25 McNeese Cowboys basketball team
