= 2024–25 East Texas A&M Lions women's basketball team =

NCAA Division I women's basketball season

2024–25 East Texas A&M Lions women's basketball
- Conference: Southland Conference
- Record: 7–22 (4–16 Southland)
- Head coach: Valerie King (2nd season)
- Assistant coaches: Brechelle Beachum; Trevor Moyer; Jaedyn De La Cerda; Madi Washington
- Home arena: The Field House

2024–25 Southland Conference women's basketball standings
	Conf.				Overall
Team	W		L	PCT	W		L	PCT
Southeastern Louisiana	19	–	1	.950	26	–	6	.813
Lamar	17	–	3	.850	22	–	8	.733
Stephen F. Austin †	16	–	4	.800	29	–	6	.829
Incarnate Word	12	–	8	.600	18	–	14	.563
Northwestern State	12	–	8	.600	16	–	16	.500
UT Rio Grande Valley	11	–	9	.550	16	–	16	.500
Nicholls	9	–	11	.450	17	–	14	.548
Texas A&M–Corpus Christi	7	–	13	.350	15	–	17	.469
New Orleans	5	–	15	.250	5	–	24	.172
McNeese	5	–	15	.250	10	–	21	.323
East Texas A&M*	4	–	16	.200	7	–	22	.241
Houston Christian	3	–	17	.150	6	–	23	.207
† 2025 Southland tournament winner * ineligible for the 2025 NCAA tournament due to transition from Division II

The 2024–25 East Texas A&M Lions women's basketball team represented East Texas A&M University in the 2024–25 NCAA Division I women's basketball season. The Lions, led by second-year head coach Valerie King, played their home games at The Field House in Commerce, Texas, as members of the Southland Conference. The Lions finished the 2024–25 season 7–22, 4–16 in conference play to finish in twelfth place. Failing to qualify for the SLC tournament, the Lions' season ended with a 56–76 loss to Northwestern State.

This season marked East Texas A&M's third year of a four-year transition period from Division II to Division I. As a result, the Lions will not be eligible for NCAA postseason play until the 2026–27 season.

This is the first season for the university under its then-current identity. On November 7, 2024, after the Lions had played their first game of the 2024–25 season, the Texas A&M University System Board of Regents approved the proposed change of the university's name from Texas A&M University–Commerce to East Texas A&M University. The name change took effect immediately.

== Media ==
Home games are broadcast on ESPN+.

== Preseason polls ==
=== Southland Conference poll ===
The Southland Conference released its preseason poll on October 17, 2024. Receiving 112 overall votes, the Lions were picked to finish sixth in the conference.

Predicted finish	Team	Votes (1st place)
1	Lamar	236 (19)
2	Southeastern Louisiana	213 (5)
3	Texas A&M–Corpus Christi	200
4	Stephen F. Austin	193
5	Incarnate Word	149
6	Texas A&M–Commerce (renamed)	112
7	Nicholls	108
8	New Orleans	109
9	UT Rio Grande Valley	92
10	Northwestern State	67
11	McNeese	61
12	Houston Christian	51

=== Preseason All-Conference ===
Jordyn Newsome was selected to the Preseason All-Conference second team.

== Roster ==
2024–25 East Texas A&M Lions women's basketball team
Players
Coaches

Pos.	#	Name	Height	Year	Previous school	Hometown
G	0	Cora Horvath	5 ft 7 in (1.7 m)	So	Theo-Koch-Schule Grünberg	Oberwart, Austria
G	1	Keiori Lee	5 ft 10 in (1.78 m)	Sr	UT Arlington	Flint, Michigan
G	2	Jordyn Newsome	5 ft 8 in (1.73 m)	Sr	Coastal Carolina	Irving, Texas
G	3	Nina Horvath	5 ft 8 in (1.73 m)	So	UNC Greensboro	Oberwart, Austria
G/F	4	Jamy De Kock	5 ft 11 in (1.8 m)	Jr	Laramie County Community College	Woudrichem, Netherlands
G	5	Nykesha Sanders	5 ft 7 in (1.7 m)	Sr	Tarleton State	Detroit, Michigan
G	7	J'Unti Franklin	5 ft 6 in (1.68 m)	Jr	Butler Community College	Natchitoches, Louisiana
G	10	Ahmya Boyce	5 ft 6 in (1.68 m)	Sr	Moberly Area Community College	Newport News, Virginia
F	11	Makenna Armstrong	6 ft 2 in (1.88 m)	Fr	Rockwall High School	Rockwall, Texas
F	21	Jasmine Payne	6 ft 0 in (1.83 m)	Sr	Tyler Junior College	Montgomery, Alabama
G	22	Hannah Humphrey	5 ft 7 in (1.7 m)	Sr	UT Arlington	Kendleton, Texas
F	35	Nyaluak Dak	6 ft 2 in (1.88 m)	Fr	Lincoln Southeast High School	Lincoln, Nebraska
F	44	Trinity Moreland	6 ft 2 in (1.88 m)	Jr	Gardner–Webb	Charlotte, North Carolina
F	54	Alva Hedrich	6 ft 2 in (1.88 m)	Jr	West Virginia Tech	Mücke, Germany
F		Tiani Ellison	6 ft 1 in (1.85 m)	So	Missouri Western	Durant, Oklahoma

Head coach

- Valerie King (Cincinnati)

Assistant coach(es)

- Brechelle Beachum (Illinois State)
- Trevor Moyer (Missouri Western)
- Jaedyn De La Cerda (New Mexico)
- Madi Washington (Tulsa)

Legend

- (C) Team captain
- (S) Suspended
- (I) Ineligible
- (W) Walk-on
- Injured
- Current redshirt

Roster
Last update: March 3, 2025

== Schedule and results ==
Date time, TV	Rank^{#}	Opponent^{#}	Result	Record	High points	High rebounds	High assists	Site (attendance) city, state
Non-conference regular season
November 6, 2024*; 6:30 p.m., ESPN+		UNT Dallas	W 75–50	1–0	18 – J. Newsome	14 – A. Hedrich	11 – N. Sanders	The Field House (342); Commerce, TX
November 8, 2024*; 10:30 a.m., SECN+		at Arkansas	L 65–84	1–1	15 – C. Horvath	7 – A. Hedrich	4 – N. Sanders	Bud Walton Arena (12,267); Fayetteville, AR
November 12, 2024*; 6:30 p.m., ESPN+		LeTourneau	W 104–33	2–1	21 – H. Humphfrey	8 – N. Dak	7 – N. Horvath	The Field House (317); Commerce, TX
November 14, 2024*; 7:00 p.m., ESPN+		at No. 17 Baylor	L 55–104	2–2	22 – C. Horvath	6 – N. Dak	7 – N. Sanders	Foster Pavilion (3,510); Waco, TX
November 18, 2024*; 6:30 p.m., ESPN+		UT Arlington	L 71–73	2–3	18 – J. Newsome	8 – A. Hedrich	3 – N. Sanders	The Field House (256); Commerce, TX
November 21, 2024*; 4:00 p.m., ESPN+		at Texas Southern	W 87–86 ^{OT}	3–3	25 – C. Horvath	7 – A. Hedrich	3 – C. Horvath	H&PE Arena (373); Houston, TX
November 29, 2024*; 1:00 p.m., -		vs. Seattle; GCU Thanksgiving Classic	L 76–79	3–4	25 – C. Horvath	9 – A. Hedrich	8 – N. Sanders	Global Credit Union Arena (102); Phoenix, AZ
November 30, 2024*; 1:00 p.m., -		at Grand Canyon; GCU Thanksgiving Classic	L 71–101	3–5	26 – J. Newsome	5 – N. Dak	7 – N. Sanders	Global Credit Union Arena (398); Phoenix, AZ
December 7, 2024*; 1:00 p.m., ESPN+		at Abilene Christian	L 59–74	3–6	19 – J. Newsome	8 – A. Hedrich	5 – N. Sanders	Moody Coliseum (348); Abilene, TX
December 14, 2024; 1:00 p.m., ESPN+		at Houston Christian	L 56–62	3–7 (0–1)	12 – J. Newsome	6 – J. Franklin	4 – J. Payne	Sharp Gymnasium (248); Houston, TX
Conference regular season
December 20, 2024; 1:00 p.m., ESPN+		at Incarnate Word	L 55–76	3–8 (0–2)	13 – J. Newsome	6 – A. Hedrich	4 – N. Sanders	McDermott Center (76); San Antonio, TX
January 2, 2025; 6:30 p.m., ESPN+		Nicholls	W 68–60	4–8 (1–2)	20 – J. Payne	8 – C. Horvath	5 – C. Horvath	The Field House (186); Commerce, TX
January 4, 2025; 12:00 p.m., ESPN+		at McNeese	L 55–64	4–9 (1–3)	18 – J. Newsome	12 – A. Hedrich	7 – N. Sanders	The Field House (367); Commerce, TX
January 9, 2025; 6:30 p.m., ESPN+		at UT Rio Grande Valley	L 68–69	4–10 (1–4)	22 – J. Newsome	8 – H. Humprey	5 – N. Sanders	UTRGV Fieldhouse (459); Edinburg, TX
January 16, 2025; 6:30 p.m., ESPN+		Southeastern Louisiana	L 44–57	4–11 (1–5)	17 – J. Payne	11 – A. Hedrich	4 – N. Sanders	The Field House (637); Commerce, TX
January 18, 2025; 12:00 p.m., ESPN+		New Orleans	L 62–66 ^{OT}	4–12 (1–6)	19 – C. Horvath	12 – A. Hedrich	3 – C. Horvath	The Field House (364); Commerce, TX
January 25, 2025; 3:00 p.m., ESPN+		at Lamar	L 65–83	4–13 (1–7)	20 – J. Newsome	6 – C. Horvath	5 – C. Horvath	Neches Arena (1,012); Beaumont, TX
January 27, 2025; 5:00 p.m., ESPN+		at Stephen F. Austin	L 65–92	4–14 (1–8)	13 – J. Franklin	10 – A. Hedrich	4 – J. Newsome	William R. Johnson Coliseum (945); Nacogdoches, TX
January 30, 2025; 6:30 p.m., ESPN+		Texas A&M–Corpus Christi	L 45–55	4–15 (1–9)	17 – C. Horvath	7 – C. Horvath	6 – N. Sanders	The Field House (392); Commerce, TX
February 1, 2025; 12:00 p.m., ESPN+		Northwestern State	L 50–61	4–16 (1–10)	13 – J. Payne	7 – N. Horvath	2 – J. Payne	The Field House (371); Commerce, TX
February 6, 2025; 6:00 p.m., ESPN+		at McNeese	W 67–51	5–16 (2–10)	16 – J. Newsome	8 – C. Horvath	5 – C. Horvath	The Legacy Center (2,378); Lake Charles, LA
February 8, 2025; 1:00 p.m., ESPN+		at Nicholls	W 67–53	6–16 (3–10)	18 – J. Newsome	8 – T. Moreland	4 – C. Horvath	Stopher Gymnasium (442); Thibodaux, LA
February 13, 2025; 6:30 p.m., ESPN+		Stephen F. Austin	L 55–71	6–17 (3–11)	17 – J. Payne	9 – A. Hedrich	10 – C. Horvath	The Field House (502); Commerce, TX
February 15, 2025; 12:00 p.m., ESPN+		Lamar	L 57–71	6–18 (3–12)	16 – J. Newsome	6 – T. Moreland	5 – J. De Kock	The Field House (377); Commerce, TX
February 20, 2025; 6:30 p.m., ESPN+		at New Orleans	L 52–78	6–19 (3–13)	12 – J. De Kock	10 – A. Hedrich	3 – C. Horvath	Lakefront Arena (402); New Orleans, LA
February 22, 2025; 1:00 p.m., ESPN+		at Southeastern Louisiana	L 55–75	6–20 (3–14)	11 – N. Horvath	8 – A. Hedrick	4 – J. De Kock	Pride Roofing University Center (888); Hammond, LA
February 27, 2025; 6:30 p.m., ESPN+		Houston Christian	W 53–45	7–20 (4–15)	16 – J. Newsome	8 – H. Hedrich	4 – N. Sanders	The Field House (686); Commerce, TX
March 1, 2025; 12:00 p.m., ESPN+		Incarnate Word	L 65–74	7–21 (4–15)	17 – J. Newsome	6 – N. Horvath	7 – J. Newsome	The Field House (347); Commerce, TX
March 5, 2025; 6:30 p.m., ESPN+		at Northwestern State	L 56–76	7–22 (4–16)	19 – J. Newsome	9 – A. Hedrich	4 – C. Horvath	Prather Coliseum (507); Natchitoches, LA
*Non-conference game. ^{#}Rankings from AP poll. (#) Tournament seedings in parentheses. All times are in Central.

== See also ==
- 2024–25 East Texas A&M Lions men's basketball team
