= 2024–25 Nicholls Colonels women's basketball team =

Intercollegiate basketball season

2024–25 Nicholls Colonels women's basketball
- Conference: Southland Conference
- Record: 17–14 (9–11 Southland)
- Head coach: Justin Payne (2nd season)
- Assistant coaches: Nicholas Graham; Tykeria Williams; Jada Terry
- Home arena: Stopher Gym

2024–25 Southland Conference women's basketball standings
	Conf.				Overall
Team	W		L	PCT	W		L	PCT
Southeastern Louisiana	19	–	1	.950	26	–	6	.813
Lamar	17	–	3	.850	22	–	8	.733
Stephen F. Austin †	16	–	4	.800	29	–	6	.829
Incarnate Word	12	–	8	.600	18	–	14	.563
Northwestern State	12	–	8	.600	16	–	16	.500
UT Rio Grande Valley	11	–	9	.550	16	–	16	.500
Nicholls	9	–	11	.450	17	–	14	.548
Texas A&M–Corpus Christi	7	–	13	.350	15	–	17	.469
New Orleans	5	–	15	.250	5	–	24	.172
McNeese	5	–	15	.250	10	–	21	.323
East Texas A&M*	4	–	16	.200	7	–	22	.241
Houston Christian	3	–	17	.150	6	–	23	.207
† 2025 Southland tournament winner * ineligible for the 2025 NCAA tournament due to transition from Division II

The 2024–25 Nicholls Colonels women's basketball team represented Nicholls State University during the 2024–25 NCAA Division I women's basketball season. The Colonels, led by second-year head coach Justin Payne, played their home games at Stopher Gym located in Thibodaux, Louisiana as members of the Southland Conference.

== Media ==
Home games were broadcast on ESPN+.

== Preseason polls ==
=== Southland Conference Poll ===
The Southland Conference released its preseason poll on October 17, 2024. Receiving 108 overall votes, the Colonels were picked to finish seventh in the conference.

Predicted finish	Team	Votes (1st place)
1	Lamar	236 (19)
2	Southeastern Louisiana	213 (5)
3	Texas A&M–Corpus Christi	200
4	Stephen F. Austin	193
5	Incarnate Word	149
6	Texas A&M–Commerce (renamed)	112
7	Nicholls	108
8	New Orleans	109
9	UT Rio Grande Valley	92
10	Northwestern State	67
11	McNeese	61
12	Houston Christian	51

=== Preseason All Conference ===
Britiya Curtis was selected as a Preseason All-Conference second team member.

== Roster ==
2024–25 Nicholls Colonels women's basketball team
Players
Coaches

Pos.	#	Name	Height	Year	Previous school	Hometown
G	1	Jesslynn Jalomo	5 ft 6 in (1.68 m)	Fr	United High School	Laredo, Texas
G	2	Paris Miller	5 ft 9 in (1.75 m)	Jr	Georgia Southern	Hampton, Georgia
G	3	Tanita Swift	5 ft 5 in (1.65 m)	Jr	Pensacola State College	Birmingham, Alabama
G	5	Malaya Jones	5 ft 4 in (1.63 m)	Fr	Grayson High School	Loganville, Georgia
G	7	Betzalys Delgado	5 ft 7 in (1.7 m)	So	Central Pointe Christian Academy	Arecibo, Puerto Rico
F	10	Laryn Scott	6 ft 1 in (1.85 m)	Fr	Sparkman High School	Harvest, Alabama
G	11	Britiya Curtis	5 ft 7 in (1.7 m)	So	Calhoun High School	Calhoun, Georgia
G	12	Caroline Adams	5 ft 7 in (1.7 m)	Fr	E.D. White High School	Thibodaux, Louisiana
F	13	Asia Broughton	6 ft 0 in (1.83 m)	Jr	Cypress Ridge High School	Houston, Texas
F	20	Elli Garnett	6 ft 0 in (1.83 m)	RS Sr	Golden High School	Golden, Colorado
G	21	Kailyn Peters	5 ft 11 in (1.8 m)	Jr	Indian River State College	Houston, Texas
G/F	22	Deonna Brister	6 ft 0 in (1.83 m)	Sr	Lake Arthur High School	Lake Arthur, Louisiana
F	23	Daelyn Craig	6 ft 0 in (1.83 m)	Sr	Georgia Southwestern	Lithia Springs, Georgia
G	24	Marypaz Martinez	5 ft 9 in (1.75 m)	RS Fr	Central Pointe Christian Academy	Tres Ríos, Costa Rica
F	25	Violette Skipworth	6 ft 0 in (1.83 m)	Sr	Florida SouthWestern State College	Pace, Florida
F	30	Emani Burks	6 ft 2 in (1.88 m)	RS Jr	South Alabama	Rockledge, Florida

Head coach

- Justin Payne (Nicholls State)

Assistant coach(es)

- Nicholas Graham (Santa Fe College)
- Tykeria Williams (Nicholls State)
- Jada Terry (Texas Tech)

Legend

- (C) Team captain
- (S) Suspended
- (I) Ineligible
- (W) Walk-on
- Injured
- Current redshirt

Roster
Last update: March 3, 2025

== Schedule ==
Date time, TV	Rank^{#}	Opponent^{#}	Result	Record	High points	High rebounds	High assists	Site (attendance) city, state
Non–conference regular season games
Nov 4, 2024*; 11:30 am, ESPN+		at Louisiana Tech	L 51–53	0–1	15 – T. Swift	8 – D. Brister	4 – T. Swift	Thomas Assembly Center (2,660); Ruston, LA
Nov 8, 2024*; 6:30 am, ESPN+		at Tulane	W 65–63	1–1	23 – J. Jalomo	6 – E. Burks	4 – E. Garnett	Devlin Fieldhouse (848); New Orleans, LA
Nov 12–13, 2024*; 12:00 pm, ESPN+		Grambling State; Game suspended on Nov 12. Resumed on Nov 13.	W 76–61	2–1	22 – T. Swift	9 – E. Garnett	3 – M. Jones	Stopher Gymnasium (465); Thibodaux, LA
Nov 19, 2024*; 6:30 pm, ESPN+		Alcorn State	W 74–55	3–1	28 – T. Swift	8 – T. Swift	5 – T. Swift	Stopher Gymnasium (256); Thibodaux, LA
Nov 22, 2024*; 6:00 pm, ESPN+		at Louisiana	L 55–60	3–2	19 – T. Swift	8 – D. Brister	3 – D. Brister	Cajundome (417); Lafayette, LA
Nov 29, 2024*; 8:00 pm, ESPN+		vs. Evansville; Big Easy Classic-Fleur de lis Classic	W 63–50	4–2	18 – T. Swift	8 – E. Burks	4 – T. Swift	Alario Center (204); New Orleans, LA
Nov 30, 2024*; 8:00 pm, ESPN+		vs. Tarleton State; Big Easy Classic-Fleur de lis Classic	W 58–51	5–2	13 – T. Swift	7 – T. Swift	5 – E. Burks	Alario Center (191); New Orleans, LA
Dec 4, 2024*; 11:00 am, ESPN+		Dillard	W 63–47	6–2	16 – D. Brister	10 – E. Garnett	8 – T. Swift	Stopher Gymnasium (3,123); Thibodaux, LA
Dec 8, 2024*; 2:00 pm		at Mississippi Valley State	W 67–56	7–2	16 – D. Brister	12 – E. Garnett	5 – E. Burks	Harrison HPER Complex (512); Itta Bena, MS
Conference regular season games
Dec 18, 2024; 6:30 pm, ESPN+		Southeastern Louisiana	L 54–58	7–3 (0–1)	20 – T. Swift	10 – T. Swift	2 – M. Jones	Stopher Gymnasium (350); Thibodaux, LA
Dec 22, 2024; 5:30 pm, ESPN+		New Orleans	W 65–61	8–3 (1–1)	12 – T. Swift	7 – T. Swift	4 – T. Swift	Stopher Gymnasium (400); Thibodaux, LA
Jan 2, 2025; 6:30 pm, ESPN+		at East Texas A&M	L 60–68	8–4 (1–2)	28 – T. Swift	6 – D. Brister	6 – T. Swift	The Field House (186); Commerce, TX
Jan 4, 2025; 1:00 pm, ESPN+		at Northwestern State	L 44–56	8–5 (1–3)	17 – T. Swift	7 – E. Garnett	3 – T. Swift	Prather Coliseum (205); Natchitoches, LA
Jan 9, 2025; 6:30 pm, ESPN+		at Incarnate Word	W 68–57	9–5 (2–3)	18 – B. Curtis	7 – D. Craig	3 – T. Swift	McDermott Center (66); San Antonio, TX
Jan 11, 2025; 1:00 pm, ESPN+		at McNeese	W 60–47	10–5 (3–3)	13 – B. Curtis	8 – D. Brister	2 – E. Burks	The Legacy Center (2,568); Lake Charles, LA
Jan 16, 2025; 6:30 pm, ESPN+		Lamar	L 53–67	10–6 (3–4)	18 – B. Curtis	6 – E. Garnett	4 – T. Swift	Stopher Gymnasium (345); Thibodaux, LA
Jan 18, 2025; 1:00 pm, ESPN+		Stephen F. Austin	W 75–71	11–6 (4–4)	22 – T. Swift	7 – D. Brister	8 – T. Swift	Stopher Gymnasium (411); Thibodaux, LA
Jan 25, 2025; 1:00 pm, ESPN+		at Texas A&M–Corpus Christi	W 59–43	12–6 (5–4)	19 – D. Brister	8 – D. Brister	4 – D. Craig	American Bank Center (1,793); Corpus Christi, TX
Jan 27, 2025; 4:00 pm, ESPN+		at UT Rio Grande Valley	W 58–50	13–6 (6–4)	16 – E. Garnett	7 – T. Swift	6 – T. Swift	UTRGV Fieldhouse (351); Edinburg, TX
Jan 30, 2025; 6:30 pm, ESPN+		Houston Christian	W 76–51	14–6 (7–4)	14 – D. Brister	7 – E. Garnett	5 – B. Curtis	Stopher Gymnasium (362); Thibodaux, LA
Feb 1, 2025; 1:00 pm, ESPN+		McNeese	W 84–67	15–6 (8–4)	23 – E. Garnett	10 – E. Garnett	3 – T. Swift	Stopher Gymnasium (412); Thibodaux, LA
Feb 6, 2025; 6:30 pm, ESPN+		Northwestern State	L 60–68	15–7 (8–5)	20 – B. Curtis	7 – E. Garnett	3 – M. Jones	Stopher Gymnasium (655); Thibodaux, LA
Feb 8, 2025; 1:00 pm, ESPN+		East Texas A&M	L 53–67	15–8 (8–6)	19 – B. Curtis	9 – E. Burks	2 – E. Garnett	Stopher Gymnasium (442); Thibodaux, LA
Feb 13, 2025; 6:30 pm, ESPN+		at New Orleans	W 72–59	16–8 (9–6)	17 – M. Jones	10 – E. Burks	4 – K. Peters	Lakefront Arena (397); New Orleans, LA
Feb 15, 2025; 1:00 pm, ESPN+		at Southeastern Louisiana	L 50–63	15–9 (9–7)	14 – E. Garnett	9 – E. Garnett	4 – D. Craig	Pride Roofing University Center (858); Hammond, LA
Feb 20, 2025; 6:30 pm, ESPN+		Texas A&M–Corpus Christi	L 44–59	16–10 (9–8)	11 – J. Jalomo	7 – E. Garnett	2 – M. Jones	Stopher Gymnasium (411); Thibodaux, LA
Feb 22, 2025; 1:00 pm, ESPN+		UT Rio Grande Valley	L 50–59	16–11 (9–9)	14 – M. Jones	9 – D. Brister	3 – M. Jones	Stopher Gymnasium (400); Thibodaux, LA
Feb 27, 2025; 7:00 pm, ESPN+		at Lamar	L 49–68	16–12 (9–10)	19 – B. Curtis	7 – E. Garnett	4 – D. Craig	Neches Arena (943); Beaumont, TX
Mar 1, 2025; 2:00 pm, ESPN+		at Stephen F. Austin	L 56–79	16–13 (9–11)	22 – B. Curtis	11 – E. Garnett	3 – D. Craig	William R. Johnson Coliseum (978); Nacogdoches, TX
2025 Jersey Mike's Subs Southland Conference Tournament (1–1)
Mar 10, 2025; 1:30 pm, ESPN+	(7)	vs. (6) UT Rio Grande Valley; First round	W 55–53	17–13 (1–0)	17 – D. Brister	12 – E. Garnett	2 – J. Jalomo	The Legacy Center (637); Lake Charles, LA
Mar 11, 2025; 3:30 pm, ESPN+	(7)	vs. (3) Stephen F. Austin; Quarterfinals	L 65–77	17–14 (1–1)	17 – D. Brister	7 – D. Brister	7 – E. Garnett	The Legacy Center (832); Lake Charles, LA
*Non-conference game. ^{#}Rankings from AP poll. (#) Tournament seedings in parentheses. All times are in Central.

== Conference awards and honors ==
=== Weekly awards ===
Weekly honors
Honors	Player	Position	Date Awarded	Ref.
SLC Women's Basketball Player of the Week	Tanita Swift	G	November 18, 2024	
SLC Women's Basketball Player of the Week	Tanita Swift	G	November 25, 2024	

== See also ==
- 2024–25 Nicholls Colonels men's basketball team
