= 2024–25 Texas A&M–Corpus Christi Islanders women's basketball team =

Intercollegiate basketball season

2024–25 Texas A&M–Corpus Christi Islanders women's basketball
- Conference: Southland Conference
- Record: 15–17 (7–13 Southland)
- Head coach: Royce Chadwick (13th season)
- Assistant coaches: Roxanne White; Darren Brunson; Gee Lawler
- Home arena: American Bank Center; Dugan Wellness Center

2024–25 Southland Conference women's basketball standings
	Conf.				Overall
Team	W		L	PCT	W		L	PCT
Southeastern Louisiana	19	–	1	.950	26	–	6	.813
Lamar	17	–	3	.850	22	–	8	.733
Stephen F. Austin †	16	–	4	.800	29	–	6	.829
Incarnate Word	12	–	8	.600	18	–	14	.563
Northwestern State	12	–	8	.600	16	–	16	.500
UT Rio Grande Valley	11	–	9	.550	16	–	16	.500
Nicholls	9	–	11	.450	17	–	14	.548
Texas A&M–Corpus Christi	7	–	13	.350	15	–	17	.469
New Orleans	5	–	15	.250	5	–	24	.172
McNeese	5	–	15	.250	10	–	21	.323
East Texas A&M*	4	–	16	.200	7	–	22	.241
Houston Christian	3	–	17	.150	6	–	23	.207
† 2025 Southland tournament winner * ineligible for the 2025 NCAA tournament due to transition from Division II

The 2024–25 Texas A&M–Corpus Christi Islanders women's basketball team represented Texas A&M University–Corpus Christi in the 2024–25 NCAA Division I women's basketball season. The Islanders were led by thirteenth–year head coach Royce Chadwick, and played their home games at the American Bank Center and the Dugan Wellness Center, as members of the Southland Conference. The Islanders finished the 2024–25 season 15–17 overall and in eighth place in conference play with a 7–13 record. The Islanders' season ended with a first round SLC tournament loss to Northwestern State.

== Media ==
Home games are broadcast on ESPN+.

== Preseason polls ==
=== Southland Conference Poll ===
The Southland Conference released its preseason poll on October 17, 2024. Receiving 200 overall votes, the Islanders were picked to finish third in the conference.

Predicted finish	Team	Votes (1st place)
1	Lamar	236 (19)
2	Southeastern Louisiana	213 (5)
3	Texas A&M–Corpus Christi	200
4	Stephen F. Austin	193
5	Incarnate Word	149
6	Texas A&M–Commerce (renamed)	112
7	Nicholls	108
8	New Orleans	109
9	UT Rio Grande Valley	92
10	Northwestern State	67
11	McNeese	61
12	Houston Christian	51

=== Preseason All Conference ===
Mireia Aguado and Paige Allen were selected as Preseason All-Conference first team members.

== Roster ==
2024–25 Texas A&M–Corpus Christi Islanders women's basketball team
Players
Coaches

Pos.	#	Name	Height	Year	Previous school	Hometown
G	0	Naiya Carney	5 ft 6 in (1.68 m)	Fr	Skyline High School	Dallas, Texas
G	1	Natalie Huff	5 ft 7 in (1.7 m)	Fr	Tom C. Clark High School	San Antonio, Texas
G	2	Tymberlin Criswell	5 ft 8 in (1.73 m)	Sr	SMU	Houston, Texas
G	3	Jaeda Whitner	5 ft 5 in (1.65 m)	Sr	Mason City High School	Mason City, Iowa
G	4	Kimora Fagan	5 ft 7 in (1.7 m)	Fr	Edinburg High School	Edinburg, Texas
G	5	Samora Watson	5 ft 6 in (1.68 m)	Jr	Central Connecticut	Eunice, Louisiana
G	9	Miriam Vilafranca	5 ft 8 in (1.73 m)	Fr	Joventut Badalona	Barcelona, Spain
F	10	Monae' Duffy	5 ft 10 in (1.78 m)	Jr	Hutchinson Community College	Lafayette, Louisiana
G/F	11	Paige Allen	5 ft 8 in (1.73 m)	GS	Oak Park High School	Kansas City, Missouri
G/F	12	Logan Reed	6 ft 0 in (1.83 m)	Fr	Godley High School	Godley, Texas
C	14	Bruna Anguera	6 ft 2 in (1.88 m)	Jr	IES Llavaneres	El Morell, Spain
F	15	Claudia Diez	6 ft 3 in (1.91 m)	So	Valencia Basket	Valencia, Spain
C	20	Torie Sevier	6 ft 4 in (1.93 m)	Fr	Braswell High School	Aubrey, Texas
G	25	Mireia Aguado	5 ft 9 in (1.75 m)	GS	Josep tous	Barcelona, Spain
G	30	Annukka Willstedt	5 ft 9 in (1.75 m)	Sr	IES Diego Velazquez	Torrelodones, Spain
F	32	Nabaweeyah McGill	6 ft 2 in (1.88 m)	GS	Carrollwood Day School	Tampa, Florida

Head coach

- Royce Chadwick (Southwestern Oklahoma State)

Assistant coach(es)

- Roxanne White (Stephen F. Austin)
- Darren Brunson (St. Mary's (TX))
- Gee Lawler (Texas A&M–Corpus Christi)

Legend

- (C) Team captain
- (S) Suspended
- (I) Ineligible
- (W) Walk-on
- Injured
- Current redshirt

Roster
Last update: March 3, 2025

== Schedule and results ==
Date time, TV	Rank^{#}	Opponent^{#}	Result	Record	High points	High rebounds	High assists	Site (attendance) city, state
Regular season
Nov 4, 2024*; 7:00 pm, SECN+		at Texas A&M	W 62–56	1–0	14 – P. Allen	12 – P. Allen	3 – A. Willstedt	Reed Arena (2,772); College Station, TX
Nov 9, 2024*; 2:00 pm, ESPN+		at Texas State	W 62–57	2–0	15 – P. Allen	9 – P. Allen	7 – M. Aguado	Strahan Arena (855); San Marcos, TX
Nov 12, 2024*; 6:00 pm, ESPN+		Sul Ross State	W 98–54	3–0	18 – J. Whitner	8 – P. Allen	6 – M. Aguado	Dugan Wellness Center (984); Corpus Christi, TX
Nov 17, 2024*; 1:00 pm, ESPN+		at No. 17 Baylor	L 42–65	3–1	11 – M. Aguado	12 – P. Allen	1 – M. Aguado	Foster Pavilion (3,435); Waco, TX
Nov 20, 2024*; 6:30 pm, ESPN+		at UTSA	L 43–62	3–2	10 – P. Allen	6 – P. Allen	6 – M. Aguado	Convocation Center (743); San Antonio, TX
Nov 26, 2024*; 4:00 pm, ESPN+		UTEP	L 53–64	3–3	14 – N. McGill	10 – P. Allen	3 – M. Aguado	American Bank Center (915); Corpus Christi, TX
Nov 30, 2024*; 1:00 pm, ESPN+		Our Lady of the Lake	W 72–37	4–3	18 – P. Allen	12 – P. Allen	4 – M. Aguado	American Bank Center (915); Corpus Christi, TX
Dec 7, 2024*; 1:00 pm, ESPN+		Dallas Christian	W 81–28	5–3	12 – J. Whitner	13 – P. Allen	3 – M. Aguado	Dugan Wellness Center (1,028); Corpus Christi, TX
Dec 14, 2024; 1:00 pm, ESPN+		Stephen F. Austin	L 59–66	5–4 (0–1)	15 – T. Criswell	9 – P. Allen	5 – M. Aguado	Dugan Wellness Center (788); Corpus Christi, TX
Dec 19, 2024*; 4:00 pm, ESPN+		vs. Kansas City; UTRGV Holiday Classic	W 64–59	6–4	17 – T. Criswell	8 – M. Duffy	4 – J. Whitner	UTRGV Fieldhouse (85); Edinburg, TX
Dec 20, 2024*; 4:00 pm, ESPN+		vs. Eastern Michigan; UTRGV Holiday Classic	W 67–52	7–4	22 – M. Aguado	9 – P. Allen	5 – M. Aguado	UTRGV Fieldhouse (42); Edinburg, TX
Dec 29, 2024*; 1:00 pm, ESPN+		Schreiner	W 90–38	8–4	17 – M. Duffy	12 – M. Duffy	5 – A. Willstedt	Dugan Wellness Center (923); Corpus Christi, TX
Jan 2, 2025; 6:30 pm, ESPN+		at New Orleans	W 78–66	9–4 (1–1)	16 – M. Aguado	7 – M. Duffy	4 – N. McGill	Lakefront Arena (389); New Orleans, LA
Jan 4, 2025; 1:00 pm, ESPN+		at Southeastern Louisiana	L 62–75	9–5 (1–2)	16 – P. Allen	8 – B. Anguera	4 – A. Willstedt	Pride Roofing University Center (623); Hammond, LA
Jan 9, 2025; 7:00 pm, ESPN+		Northwestern State	L 42–46	9–6 (1–3)	14 – M. Aguado	11 – P. Allen	2 – M. Aguado	American Bank Center (868); Corpus Christi, TX
Jan 11, 2025; 1:00 pm, ESPN+		UT Rio Grande Valley; South Texas Showdown	L 53–61	9–7 (1–4)	12 – T. Criswell	6 – A. Wilstedt	4 – M. Aguado	American Bank Center (2,004); Corpus Christi, TX
Jan 16, 2025; 6:00 pm, ESPN+		at Houston Christian	W 62–55	10–7 (2–4)	17 – P. Allen	13 – P. Allen	4 – M. Aguado	Sharp Gymnasium (331); Houston, TX
Jan 18, 2025; 1:00 pm, ESPN+		at Incarnate Word	L 58–76	10–8 (2–5)	14 – T. Criswell	4 – P. Allen	4 – A. Wilstedt	McDermott Center (231); San Antonio, TX
Jan 25, 2025; 1:00 pm, ESPN+		Nicholls	L 43–59	10–9 (2–6)	11 – P. Allen	7 – N. McGill	2 – M. Duffy	American Bank Center (1,793); Corpus Christi, TX
Jan 27, 2025; 4:30 pm, ESPN+		McNeese	L 54–59	10–10 (2–7)	13 – M. Aguado	8 – P. Allen	3 – M. Aguado	American Bank Center (1,258); Corpus Christi, TX
Jan 30, 2025; 6:30 pm, ESPN+		at East Texas A&M	W 55–45	11–10 (4–7)	16 – N. McGill	14 – N. McGill	3 – P. Allen	The Field House (392); Commerce, TX
Feb 1, 2025; 2:00 pm, ESPN+		at UT Rio Grande Valley; South Texas Showdown	L 37–56	11–11 (3–8)	9 – J. Whitner	8 – N. McGill	3 – N. McGill	UTRGV Fieldhouse (1,761); Edinburg, TX
Feb 6, 2025; 7:00 pm, ESPN+		at Lamar	L 57–63	11–12 (3–9)	14 – T. Criswell	10 – P. Allen	5 – M. Aguado	Neches Arena (781); Beaumont, TX
Feb 8, 2025; 2:00 pm, ESPN+		at Stephen F. Austin	L 56–74	11–13 (3–10)	11 – A. Willstedt	9 – P. Allen	4 – T. Criswell	William R. Johnson Coliseum (1,170); Nacogdoches, TX
Feb 13, 2025; 10:30 am, ESPN+		Houston Christian	W 74–54	12–13 (4–10)	15 – J. Whitner	7 – M. Duffy	5 – M. Aguado	American Bank Center (2,142); Corpus Christi, TX
Feb 15, 2025; 1:00 pm, ESPN+		Incarnate Word	L 55–63 ^{OT}	12–14 (4–11)	12 – S. Watson	10 – P. Allen	2 – M. Duffy	American Bank Center (1,308); Corpus Christi, TX
Feb 20, 2025; 6:30 pm, ESPN+		at Nicholls	W 59–44	13–14 (5–11)	15 – T. Criswell	10 – P. Allen	5 – M. Aguado	Stopher Gymnasium (411); Thibodaux, LA
Feb 22, 2025; 1:00 pm, ESPN+		at McNeese	L 60–69	13–15 (5–12)	14 – T. Criswell	11 – M. Duffy	4 – M. Aguado	The Legacy Center (2,658); Lake Charles, LA
Feb 27, 2025; 7:00 pm, ESPN+		New Orleans	W 90–76	14–15 (6–12)	15 – T. Criswell	14 – P. Allen	4 – T. Criswell	American Bank Center (1,215); Corpus Christi, TX
Mar 1, 2025; 2:00 pm, ESPN+		Southeastern Louisiana	W 54–52	15–15 (7–12)	14 – T. Criswell	12 – M. Duffy	3 – P. Allen	American Bank Center (1,936); Corpus Christi, TX
Mar 5, 2025; 27:00 pm, ESPN+		Lamar	L 54–71	15–16 (7–13)	13 – T. Criswell	8 – M. Duffy	2 – A. Wilstedt	American Bank Center (1,332); Corpus Christi, TX
2025 Jersey Mike's Subs Southland Conference Tournament
Mar 10, 2025; 11:00 am, ESPN+	(8)	vs. (5) Northwestern State; First round	L 63–66	15–17	19 – P. Allen	6 – P. Allen	4 – T. Criswell	The Legacy Center; Lake Charles, LA
*Non-conference game. ^{#}Rankings from AP poll. (#) Tournament seedings in parentheses. All times are in Central.

== Conference awards and honors ==
=== Weekly awards ===
Weekly honors
Honors	Player	Position	Date Awarded	Ref.
SLC Women's Basketball Player of the Week	Paige Allen	G/F	November 11, 2024	
SLC Women's Basketball Player of the Week	Mireia Aguado	G	December 30, 2024	

== See also ==
- 2024–25 Texas A&M–Corpus Christi Islanders men's basketball team
