= 2024–25 UT Rio Grande Valley Vaqueros women's basketball team =

American college basketball season

2024–25 UT Rio Grande Valley Vaqueros women's basketball
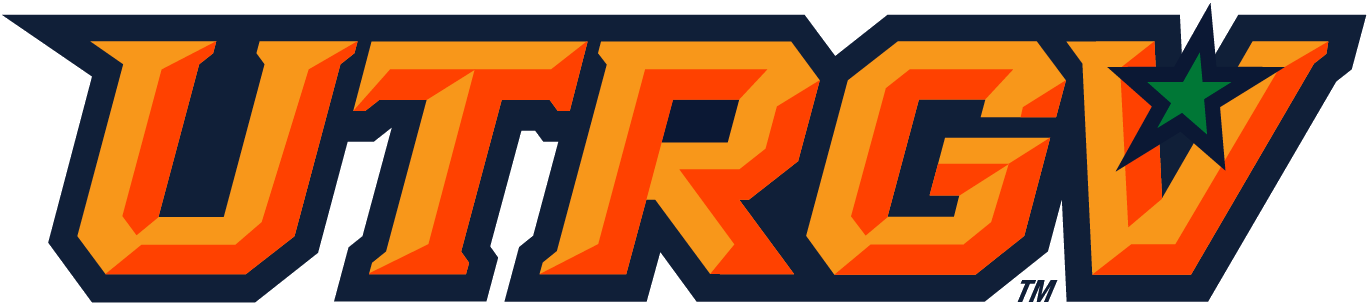
- Conference: Southland Conference
- Record: 16–16 (11–9 SLC)
- Head coach: Lane Lord (7th season)
- Associate head coach: Kevin Hackerott
- Assistant coaches: Ipek Turkyilmaz; Keanna Keys; Victoria Pena
- Home arena: UTRGV Fieldhouse

2024–25 Southland Conference women's basketball standings
	Conf.				Overall
Team	W		L	PCT	W		L	PCT
Southeastern Louisiana	19	–	1	.950	26	–	6	.813
Lamar	17	–	3	.850	22	–	8	.733
Stephen F. Austin †	16	–	4	.800	29	–	6	.829
Incarnate Word	12	–	8	.600	18	–	14	.563
Northwestern State	12	–	8	.600	16	–	16	.500
UT Rio Grande Valley	11	–	9	.550	16	–	16	.500
Nicholls	9	–	11	.450	17	–	14	.548
Texas A&M–Corpus Christi	7	–	13	.350	15	–	17	.469
New Orleans	5	–	15	.250	5	–	24	.172
McNeese	5	–	15	.250	10	–	21	.323
East Texas A&M*	4	–	16	.200	7	–	22	.241
Houston Christian	3	–	17	.150	6	–	23	.207
† 2025 Southland tournament winner * ineligible for the 2025 NCAA tournament due to transition from Division II

The 2024–25 UT Rio Grande Valley Vaqueros women's basketball team represented the University of Texas Rio Grande Valley during the 2024–25 NCAA Division I women's basketball season. The Vaqueros, led by seventh-year head coach Lane Lord, played their home games at UTRGV Fieldhouse in Edinburg, Texas as members of the Southland Conference. The Vaqueros finished the season 16–16 overall and in sixth place in conference play with a 11–9 record. The Vaqueros' season ended with a first-round SLC tournament loss to Nicholls.

This was the Vaqueros' first season as members of the Southland Conference, as on March 25, 2024, it was announced that the school had accepted an invitation to join that conference, with the move from the Western Athletic Conference becoming official on July 1, 2024.

== Preseason polls ==
=== Southland Conference Poll ===
The Southland Conference released its preseason poll on October 17, 2024. Receiving 92 overall votes, the Vaqueros were picked to finish ninth in the conference.

Predicted finish	Team	Votes (1st place)
1	Lamar	236 (19)
2	Southeastern Louisiana	213 (5)
3	Texas A&M–Corpus Christi	200
4	Stephen F. Austin	193
5	Incarnate Word	149
6	Texas A&M–Commerce (renamed)	112
7	Nicholls	108
8	New Orleans	109
9	UT Rio Grande Valley	92
10	Northwestern State	67
11	McNeese	61
12	Houston Christian	51

=== Preseason All Conference ===
No Vaqueros were selected to a Preseason All-Conference team.

== Roster ==
2024–25 UT Rio Grande Valley Vaqueros women's basketball team
Players
Coaches

Pos.	#	Name	Height	Year	Previous school	Hometown
G	0	Tierra Trotter	5 ft 4 in (1.63 m)	Sr	Northwest Mississippi Community College	Bryant, AR
F	1	Charlotte O'Keefe	6 ft 3 in (1.91 m)	Jr	Saint Thomas Aquinas High School	Overland Park, KS
G	2	Kayla Lorenz	6 ft 1 in (1.85 m)	Fr	Lynnwood High School	Seattle, WA
G	3	Gianna Angiolet	5 ft 9 in (1.75 m)	Fr	Westlake High School	Austin, TX
G	4	Ja'Shelle Johnson	5 ft 4 in (1.63 m)	So	Johnson High School	San Antonio, TX
G/F	5	Kade Hackerott	5 ft 11 in (1.8 m)	GS	Central Missouri	Wichita, KS
G/F	10	Mariam Traore	6 ft 0 in (1.83 m)	Sr	Clarendon College	Bamako, Mali
G	11	Jayda Holiman	5 ft 7 in (1.7 m)	So	McAlester High School	McAlester, OK
G	12	Elizabeth Romer	5 ft 11 in (1.8 m)	Fr	Kapaun Mt. Carmel Catholic High School	Wichita, KS
G	14	Sophia Zufelt	5 ft 8 in (1.73 m)	Fr	Lake City High School	Coeur d'Alene, ID
G	15	Taylor Meyners	5 ft 7 in (1.7 m)	So	Georgetown High School	Georgetown, TX
F	20	Chynell Mitchell	6 ft 1 in (1.85 m)	GS	Alabama A&M	Austin, TX
G/F	22	Faith Phillips	5 ft 11 in (1.8 m)	Sr	St. Mary's (TX)	San Marcos, TX
G	24	Madison Huhn	5 ft 9 in (1.75 m)	So	Miami (OH)	San Diego, CA
F	30	Brianna Sanchez	6 ft 2 in (1.88 m)	Sr	Auburn Montgomery	Edinburg, TX
G	33	JaNai Coleman	5 ft 8 in (1.73 m)	Fr	Vela High School	Edinburg, TX

Head coach

- Lane Lord (Tabor)

Assistant coach(es)

- Kevin Hackerott (St. Mary of the Plains)
- Ipek Turkyilmaz (Arizona)
- Keanna Keys (Little Rock)
- Victoria Pena (Stephen F. Austin)

Legend

- (C) Team captain
- (S) Suspended
- (I) Ineligible
- (W) Walk-on
- Injured
- Current redshirt

Roster
Last update: March 3, 2025

== Schedule and results ==
Date time, TV	Rank^{#}	Opponent^{#}	Result	Record	High points	High rebounds	High assists	Site (attendance) city, state
Regular season
November 5, 2024*; 7:00 p.m., ESPN+		at Houston	W 70–68	1–0	20 – K. Hackerott	6 – K. Hackerott	6 – G. Angiolet	Fertitta Center (759); Houston, TX
November 9, 2024*; 2:00 p.m., ESPN+		at UTSA	L 69–70	1–1	24 – K. Hackerott	6 – K. Hackerott	3 – K. Hackerott	Convocation Center (739); San Antonio, TX
November 11, 2024*; 7:00 p.m., ESPN+		at Oral Roberts	L 58–65	1–2	15 – K. Hackerott	17 – C. O'Keefe	4 – K. Hackerott	Mabee Center (1,817); Tulsa, OK
November 17, 2024*; 1:00 p.m., ESPN+		at South Florida	L 45–57	1–3	11 – C. O'Keefe	18 – C. O'Keefe	3 – T. Trotter	Yuengling Center (2,460); Tampa, FL
November 23, 2024*; 2:00 p.m., ESPN+		Arlington Baptist	W 110–37	2–3	17 – C. Mitchell	13 – C. O'Keefe	6 – T. Trotter	UTRGV Fieldhouse (633); Edinburg, TX
November 25, 2024*; 4:00 p.m., ESPN+		St. Mary's (TX)	W 73–42	3–3	18 – K. Hackerott	9 – C. Mitchell	2 – S. Zufelt	UTRGV Fieldhouse (807); Edinburg, TX
November 30, 2024*; 2:00 p.m., ESPN+		Texas State	L 59–68	3–4	10 – C. O'Keefe	7 – C. O'Keefe	3 – C. O'Keefe	UTRGV Fieldhouse (515); Edingburg, TX
December 4, 2024*; 6:30 p.m., ESPN+		Abilene Christian	L 45–59	3–5	17 – G. Angiolet	12 – K. Hackerott	2 – G. Angiolet	UTRGV Fieldhouse (488); Edingburg, TX
December 7, 2024; 6:30 p.m., ESPN+		Stephen F. Austin	W 78–72	4–5 (1–0)	17 – K. Lorenz	15 – C. O'Keefe	8 – J. Johnson	UTRGV Fieldhouse (418); Edingburg, TX
December 14, 2024; 2:00 p.m., ESPN+		Lamar	L 44–69	4–6 (1–1)	10 – K. Hackerott	5 – K. Hackerott	4 – K. Hackerott	UTRGV Fieldhouse (410); Edingburg, TX
December 19, 2024*; 6:30 p.m., ESPN+		Eastern Michigan; UTRGV Holiday Classic	W 73–66 ^{OT}	5–6	18 – K. Hackerott	17 – C. O'Keefe	5 – K. Hackerott	UTRGV Fieldhouse (502); Edingburg, TX
December 20, 2024*; 6:30 p.m., ESPN+		Kansas City; UTRGV Holiday Classic	W 71–54	6–6	13 – K. Hackerott	14 – C. O'Keefe	6 – K. Hackerott	UTRGV Fieldhouse (258); Edingburg, TX
December 29, 2024*; 3:00 p.m., ESPN+		at No. 6 Texas	L 35–94	6–7	7 – K. Hackerott	11 – C. O'Keefe	2 – 2 tied	Moody Center (7,157); Austin, TX
January 2, 2025; 6:00 p.m., ESPN+		at Southeastern Louisiana	L 41–80	6–8 (1–2)	9 – C. O'Keefe	10 – C. O'Keefe	1 – C. O'Keefe	Pride Roofing University Center (541); Hammond, LA
January 4, 2025; 2:00 p.m., ESPN+		at New Orleans	W 64–62	7–8 (2–2)	15 – K. Hackerott	14 – C. O'Keefe	4 – K. Hackerott	Lakefront Arena (345); New Orleans, LA
January 9, 2025; 6:30 p.m., ESPN+		East Texas A&M	W 69–68	8–8 (3–2)	19 – C. O'Keefe	18 – C. O'Keefe	– K. Hackerott	UTRGV Fieldhouse (459); Edinburg, TX
January 11, 2025; 1:00 p.m., ESPN+		at Texas A&M–Corpus Christi; South Texas Showdown	W 61–53	9–8 (4–2)	15 – K. Hackerott	14 – C. O'Keefe	5 – T. Trotter	American Bank Center (2,004); Corpus Christi, TX
January 16, 2025; 6:30 p.m., ESPN+		at Incarnate Word	L 43–52	9–9 (4–3)	16 – C. O'Keefe	16 – C. O'Keefe	2 – K. Hackerott	McDermott Center (117); San Antonio, TX
January 18, 2025; 1:00 p.m., ESPN+		at Houston Christian	L 64–67	9–10 (4–4)	15 – K. Lorenz	16 – C. O'Keefe	5 – K. Hackerott	Sharp Gymnasium (348); Houston, TX
January 25, 2025; 2:00 p.m., ESPN+		McNeese	W 73–65	10–10 (5–4)	23 – C. O'Keefe	20 – C. O'Keefe	7 – C. Mitchell	UTRGV Fieldhouse (808); Edinburg, TX
January 27, 2025; 4:00 p.m., ESPN+		Nicholls	L 50–58	10–11 (5–5)	14 – G. Angiolet	22 – C. O'Keefe	5 – C. O'Keefe	UTRGV Fieldhouse (351); Edinburg, TX
January 30, 2025; 6:30 p.m., ESPN+		at Northwestern State	L 66–73	10–12 (5–6)	22 – K. Hackerott	14 – C. O'Keefe	4 – T. Trotter	Prather Coliseum (361); Natchitoches, LA
February 1, 2025; 2:00 p.m., ESPN+		Texas A&M–Corpus Christi; South Texas Showdown	W 56–37	11–12 (6–6)	15 – K. Lorenz	12 – T. Trotter	8 – T. Trotter	UTRGV Fieldhouse (1,761); Edinburg, TX
February 6, 2025; 6:30 p.m., ESPN+		at Stephen F. Austin	L 67–87	11–13 (6–7)	15 – K. Lorenz	9 – K. Hackerott	5 – C. O'Keefe	William R. Johnson Coliseum (1,195); Nacogdoches, TX
February 8, 2025; 3:00 p.m., ESPN+		at Lamar	W 58–56	12–13 (7–7)	20 – K. Hackerott	15 – C. Mitchell	6 – K. Hackerott	Neches Arena (598); Beaumont, TX
February 13, 2025; 6:30 p.m., ESPN+		Incarnate Word	W 59–37	13–13 (8–7)	14 – K. Hackerott	14 – C. O'Keefe	8 – T. Trotter	UTRGV Fieldhouse (1,061); San Antonio, TX
February 15, 2025; 2:00 p.m., ESPN+		Houston Christian	W 58–55 ^{OT}	14–13 (9–7)	14 – K. Hackerott	11 – C. O'Keefe	5 – T. Trotter	UTRGV Fieldhouse (933); San Antonio, TX
February 20, 2025; 6:00 p.m., ESPN+		at McNeese	W 67–44	15–13 (10–7)	16 – T. Trotter	15 – C. O'Keefe	4 – T. Trotter	The Legacy Center (1,446); Lake Charles, LA
February 22, 2025; 1:00 p.m., ESPN+		at Nicholls	W 59–50	16–13 (11–7)	17 – K. Hackerott	11 – C. O'Keefe	5 – T. Trotter	Stopher Gymnasium (400); Thibodaux, LA
February 27, 2025; 12:00 p.m., ESPN+		Southeastern Louisiana	L 48–52	16–14 (11–8)	15 – E. Romer	11 – K. Hackerott	3 – 3 tied	UTRGV Fieldhouse (2,478); Edinburg, TX
March 1, 2025; 2:00 p.m., ESPN+		New Orleans	L 59–72	16–15 (11–9)	20 – C. O'Keefe	24 – C. O'Keefe	5 – C. O'Keefe	UTRGV Fieldhouse (863); Edinburg, TX
2025 Jersey Mike's Subs Southland Conference Tournament
March 10, 2025; 1:30 p.m., ESPN+	(6)	vs. (7) Nicholls; First round	L 53–55	16–16	15 – K. Hackerott	11 – C. O'Keefe	2 – 2 tied	The Legacy Center (637); Lake Charles, LA
*Non-conference game. ^{#}Rankings from AP poll. (#) Tournament seedings in parentheses. All times are in Central.
