= 2024–25 Northwestern State Lady Demons basketball team =

Intercollegiate basketball season

2024–25 Northwestern State Lady Demons basketball

WNIT, first round
- Conference: Southland Conference
- Record: 16–16 (12–8 Southland)
- Head coach: Anna Nimz (5th season)
- Assistant coaches: Leasa Ailshie; Mike Brown; P'hariz Watkins
- Home arena: Prather Coliseum (Capacity: 3,900)

2024–25 Southland Conference women's basketball standings
	Conf.				Overall
Team	W		L	PCT	W		L	PCT
Southeastern Louisiana	19	–	1	.950	26	–	6	.813
Lamar	17	–	3	.850	22	–	8	.733
Stephen F. Austin †	16	–	4	.800	29	–	6	.829
Incarnate Word	12	–	8	.600	18	–	14	.563
Northwestern State	12	–	8	.600	16	–	16	.500
UT Rio Grande Valley	11	–	9	.550	16	–	16	.500
Nicholls	9	–	11	.450	17	–	14	.548
Texas A&M–Corpus Christi	7	–	13	.350	15	–	17	.469
New Orleans	5	–	15	.250	5	–	24	.172
McNeese	5	–	15	.250	10	–	21	.323
East Texas A&M*	4	–	16	.200	7	–	22	.241
Houston Christian	3	–	17	.150	6	–	23	.207
† 2025 Southland tournament winner * ineligible for the 2025 NCAA tournament due to transition from Division II

The 2024–25 Northwestern State Lady Demons basketball team represented Northwestern State University during the 2024–25 NCAA Division I women's basketball season. The Demons, led by fifth-year head coach Anna Nimz, played their home games at Prather Coliseum in Natchitoches, Louisiana as members of the Southland Conference. They finished the season 16–16, 12–18 in Southland play, to finish in a tie for fourth place.

== Media ==
Home games were broadcast on ESPN+.

== Preseason polls ==
=== Southland Conference Poll ===
The Southland Conference released its preseason poll on October 17, 2024. Receiving 67 overall votes, the Lady Demons were picked to finish tenth in the conference.

Predicted finish	Team	Votes (1st place)
1	Lamar	236 (19)
2	Southeastern Louisiana	213 (5)
3	Texas A&M–Corpus Christi	200
4	Stephen F. Austin	193
5	Incarnate Word	149
6	Texas A&M–Commerce (renamed)	112
7	Nicholls	108
8	New Orleans	109
9	UT Rio Grande Valley	92
10	Northwestern State	67
11	McNeese	61
12	Houston Christian	51

=== Preseason All-conference ===
No Lady Demons were selected as members of a Preseason All-conference team.

== Roster ==
2024–25 Northwestern State Lady Demons women's basketball team
Players
Coaches

Pos.	#	Name	Height	Year	Previous school	Hometown
G	1	Jermesha Frierson	5 ft 7 in (1.7 m)	So	Southwood High School	Shreveport, LA
G	2	Momina Kassim	5 ft 10 in (1.78 m)	Fr	C.E. King High School	Houston, TX
G	3	Mya Blake	5 ft 5 in (1.65 m)	Sr	Stanislaus State	Stockton, CA
G	4	Laia Oliva	5 ft 7 in (1.7 m)	Fr	Francesc Macià	Barcelona, Spain
G	5	Zhane Thompson	5 ft 8 in (1.73 m)	GS	UTEP	Burnsville, MN
F	11	Jasmin Dixon	6 ft 3 in (1.91 m)	GS	Prairie View A&M	Spring, TX
F	12	Payton Miller	5 ft 11 in (1.8 m)	Fr	Wylie High School	St. Paul, TX
G	13	Nia Hardison	5 ft 8 in (1.73 m)	Sr	Southwest Mississippi Community College	Natchitoches, LA
F	15	Clarence Djuela	6 ft 1 in (1.85 m)	Fr	Sophie Scholl Oberschule	Berlin, Germany
G	17	Carla Celaya	5 ft 11 in (1.8 m)	Jr	Vermont	Barcelona, Spain
G	19	Sharna Ayres	5 ft 10 in (1.78 m)	GS	LSU	Melbourne, Australia
G	22	Joceline Geara	5 ft 7 in (1.7 m)	Fr	SABIS International School	Byblos, Lebanon
G	23	Chelsy Singleton	5 ft 7 in (1.7 m)	So	Blinn College	Cypress, TX
F	24	Skye Miller	5 ft 10 in (1.78 m)	Sr	Utah State	Anchorage, AK
F	32	Vernell Atamah	6 ft 0 in (1.83 m)	Fr	John D. Horn High School	Mesquite, TX
C	34	Alexis Reese	5 ft 11 in (1.8 m)	Jr	Cochise College	Cleveland, OH

Head coach

- Anna Nimz (Pittsburg State)

Assistant coach(es)

- Leasa Ailshie (Sam Houston State)
- Mike Brown (Drake)
- P'hariz Watkins (Heidelberg)

Legend

- (C) Team captain
- (S) Suspended
- (I) Ineligible
- (W) Walk-on
- Injured
- Current redshirt

Roster
Last update: March 3, 2025

== Schedule ==
Date time, TV	Rank^{#}	Opponent^{#}	Result	Record	High points	High rebounds	High assists	Site (attendance) city, state
Regular season
November 5, 2024*; 6:30 p.m., ESPN+		Champion Christian	W 84–33	1–0	20 – Z. Thompson	9 – V. Atamah	6 – M. Blake	Prather Coliseum (360); Natchitoches, LA
November 8, 2024*; 7:00 p.m., SECN+		at LSU	L 36–95	1–1	9 – V. Atamah	7 – V. Atamah	4 – M. Blake	Pete Maravich Assembly Center (10,226); Baton Rouge, LA
November 12, 2024*; 7:30 p.m., ESPN		Arkansas Baptist	W 98–27	2–1	22 – M. Blake	8 – S. Ayres	4 – M. Blake	Prather Coliseum (305); Natchitoches, LA
November 16, 2024*; 1:00 p.m., ESPN+		at Tarleton State	L 56–73	2–2	22 – M. Blake	7 – V. Atamah	3 – M. Blake	Wisdom Gym (677); Stephenville, TX
November 17, 2024*; 2:00 p.m., SECN+		at Texas A&M	L 54–75	2–3	14 – V. Atamah	6 – V. Atamah	3 – M. Blake	Reed Arena (3,279); College Station, TX
November 20, 2024*; 6:00 p.m., ESPN+		at North Texas	L 59–62	2–4	18 – M. Blake	6 – S. Ayres	3 – M. Blake	The Super Pit (1,491); Denton, TX
November 26, 2024*; 6:30 p.m., ESPN+		Southern (New Orleans)	W 80–45	3–4	20 – V. Atamah	9 – S. Ayres	8 – M. Blake	Prather Coliseum (194); Natchitoches, LA
December 6, 2024; 1:00 p.m., ESPN+		at Incarnate Word	W 46–28	3–5 (0–1)	15 – M. Blake	12 – M. Blake	2 – J. Dixon	McDermott Center; San Antonio, TX
December 14, 2024*; 1:00 p.m., ESPN+		Central Arkansas	L 52–62	3–6	14 – M. Blake	16 – J. Dixon	5 – M. Blake	Prather Coliseum; Natchitoches, LA
December 17, 2024*; 7:00 p.m., ESPN+		at South Florida	L 36–71	3–7	10 – V. Atamah	5 – C. Celaya	2 – C. Celaya	Yuengling Center (1,784); Tampa, FL
December 29, 2024; 2:00 p.m., ESPN+		at Houston Christian	W 57–51	4–7 (1–1)	20 – S. Ayres	8 – J. Dixon	4 – M. Blake	Sharp Gymnasium (311); Houston, TX
January 2, 2025; 6:30 p.m., ESPN+		McNeese	W 70–55	5–7 (2–1)	23 – S. Ayres	9 – M. Blake	6 – M. Blake	Prather Coliseum (351); Natchitoches, LA
January 4, 2025; 1:00 p.m., ESPN+		Nicholls	W 56–44	6–7 (3–1)	19 – M. Blake	9 – M. Blake	3 – M. Blake	Prather Coliseum (205); Natchitoches, LA
January 9, 2025; 7:00 p.m., ESPN+		at Texas A&M–Corpus Christi	W 46–42	7–7 (4–1)	17 – M. Blake	12 – V. Atamah	3 – M. Blake	American Bank Center (868); Corpus Christi, TX
January 16, 2025; 6:30 p.m., ESPN+		New Orleans	W 83–66	8–7 (5–1)	29 – V. Atamah	11 – V. Atamah	2 – J. Frierson	Prather Coliseum (434); Natchitoches, LA
January 18, 2025; 1:00 p.m., ESPN+		Southeastern Louisiana	L 57–66	8–8 (5–2)	21 – V. Atamah	5 – M. Blake	4 – M. Blake	Prather Coliseum (374); Natchitoches, LA
January 25, 2025; 2:00 p.m., ESPN+		at Stephen F. Austin	L 65–67	8–9 (5–3)	37 – M. Blake	7 – M. Blake	4 – M. Blake	William R. Johnson Coliseum (1,213); Nacogdoches, TX
January 27, 2025; 4:00 p.m., ESPN+		at Lamar	L 55–59	8–10 (5–4)	25 – M. Blake	10 – V. Atamah	7 – M. Blake	Neches Arena (957); Beaumont, TX
January 30, 2025; 6:30 p.m., ESPN+		UT Rio Grande Valley	W 73–66	9–10 (6–4)	31 – M. Blake	9 – J. Dixon	5 – M. Blake	Prather Coliseum (361); Natchitoches, LA
February 1, 2025; 12:00 p.m., ESPN+		at East Texas A&M	W 61–50	10–10 (7–4)	16 – M. Blake	13 – J. Dixon	5 – C. Celaya	The Field House (371); Commerce, TX
February 6, 2025; 6:30 p.m., ESPN+		at Nicholls	W 68–60	11–10 (8–4)	32 – M. Blake	8 – V. Atamah	3 – M. Blake	Stopher Gymnasium (655); Thibodaux, LA
February 8, 2025; 1:00 p.m., ESPN+		at McNeese	W 80–56	12–10 (9–4)	10 – M. Blake	6 – S. Ayres	8 – M. Blake	The Legacy Center (1,235); Lake Charles, LA
February 13, 2025; 6:30 p.m., ESPN+		Lamar	L 46–58	12–11 (9–5)	16 – N. Hardison	9 – M. Blake	5 – M. Blake	Prather Coliseum (571); Natchitoches, LA
February 15, 2025; 1:00 p.m., ESPN+		Stephen F. Austin	L 66–68	12–12 (9–6)	22 – M. Blake	14 – V. Atamah	7 – M. Blake	Prather Coliseum (607); Natchitoches, LA
February 20, 2025; 6:00 p.m., ESPN+		at Southeastern Louisiana	L 58–65	12–13 (9–7)	17 – S. Ayres	14 – V. Atamah	4 – M. Blake	Pride Roofing University Center (582); Hammond, LA
February 22, 2025; 2:00 p.m., ESPN+		at New Orleans	W 76–74	13–13 (10–7)	31 – M. Blake	9 – V. Atamah	2 – V. Atamah	Lakefront Arena (369); New Orleans, LA
February 27, 2025; 6:30 p.m., ESPN+		Incarnate Word	L 64–71	13–14 (10–9)	18 – M. Blake	6 – M. Blake	4 – M. Blake	Prather Coliseum (726); Natchitoches, LA
March 1, 2025; 1:00 p.m., ESPN+		Houston Christian	W 71–53	14–14 (11–8)	19 – V. Atamah	9 – V. Atamah	3 – M. Blake	Prather Coliseum (385); Natchitoches, LA
March 5, 2025; 6:30 p.m., ESPN+		East Texas A&M	W 76–56	15–14 (12–8)	21 – N. Hardison	10 – V. Atamah	4 – M. Blake	Prather Coliseum (597); Natchitoches, LA
2025 Jersey Mike's Subs Southland Conference Tournament (1–1)
March 10, 2025; 11:00 a.m., ESPN+	(5)	vs. (8) Texas A&M–Corpus Christi; First round	W 66–63	16–14 (1–0)	21 – S. Ayres	9 – 2 tied	7 – M. Blake	The Legacy Center; Lake Charles, LA
March 11, 2025; 11:00 a.m., ESPN+	(5)	vs. (4) Incarnate Word; Quarterfinals	L 54–69	16–15 (1–1)	29 – M. Blake	8 – 2 tied	3 – C. Celaya	The Legacy Center; Lake Charles, LA
WNIT
March 20, 2025*; 6:00 p.m., ESPN+		at Abilene Christian; First round	L 59–86	16–16	14 – 2 tied	6 – V. Atamah	4 – S. Ayres	Moody Coliseum (437); Abilene, TX
*Non-conference game. ^{#}Rankings from AP poll. (#) Tournament seedings in parentheses. All times are in Central.

== Conference awards and honors ==
=== Weekly awards ===
Weekly honors
Honors	Player	Position	Date awarded	Ref.
SLC Women's Basketball Player of the Week	Mya Blake	G	January 6, 2025	
SLC Women's Basketball Player of the Week	Vernell Atamah	G	January 20, 2025	
SLC Women's Basketball Player of the Week	Mya Blake	G	February 10, 2025	

== See also ==
- 2024–25 Northwestern State Demons basketball team
