= 2024–25 Houston Christian Huskies women's basketball team =

Intercollegiate basketball season

2024–25 Houston Christian Huskies women's basketball
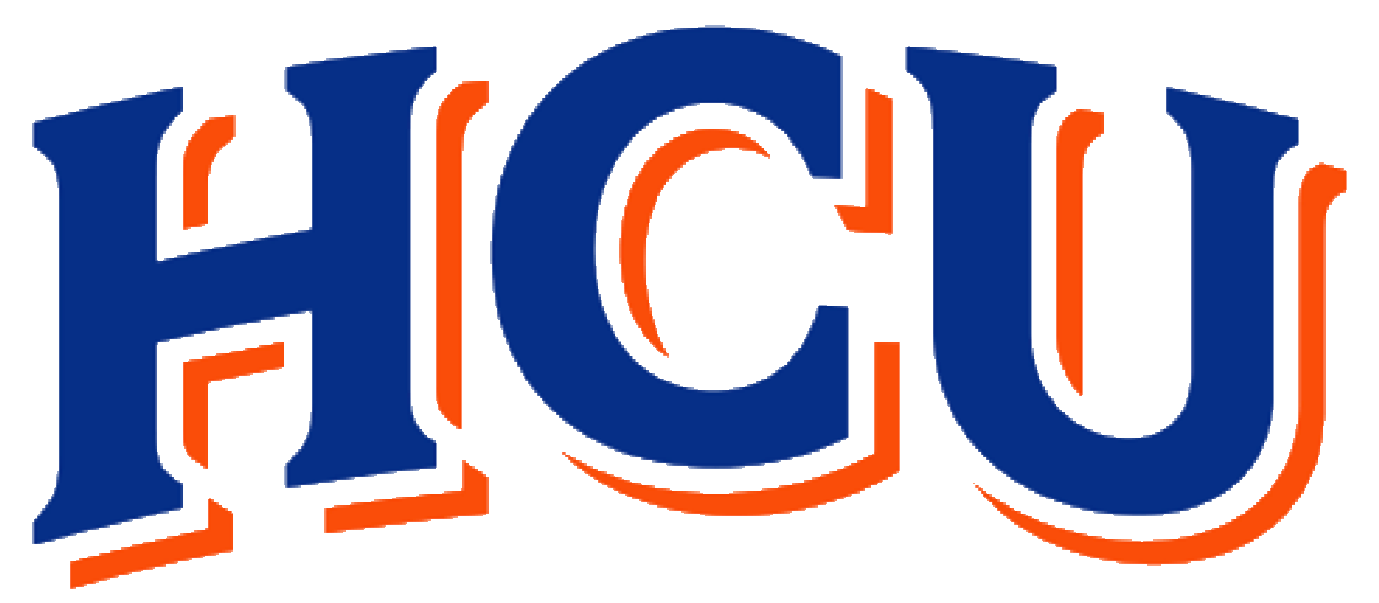
- Conference: Southland Conference
- Record: 6–23 (3–17 Southland)
- Head coach: Donna Finnie (12th season)
- Associate head coach: Taylor Reed
- Assistant coaches: Dianna Wilson-Jones; Myles Sherman; Owen Adams
- Home arena: Sharp Gymnasium (Capacity: 1,000)

2024–25 Southland Conference women's basketball standings
	Conf.				Overall
Team	W		L	PCT	W		L	PCT
Southeastern Louisiana	19	–	1	.950	26	–	6	.813
Lamar	17	–	3	.850	22	–	8	.733
Stephen F. Austin †	16	–	4	.800	29	–	6	.829
Incarnate Word	12	–	8	.600	18	–	14	.563
Northwestern State	12	–	8	.600	16	–	16	.500
UT Rio Grande Valley	11	–	9	.550	16	–	16	.500
Nicholls	9	–	11	.450	17	–	14	.548
Texas A&M–Corpus Christi	7	–	13	.350	15	–	17	.469
New Orleans	5	–	15	.250	5	–	24	.172
McNeese	5	–	15	.250	10	–	21	.323
East Texas A&M*	4	–	16	.200	7	–	22	.241
Houston Christian	3	–	17	.150	6	–	23	.207
† 2025 Southland tournament winner * ineligible for the 2025 NCAA tournament due to transition from Division II

The 2024–25 Houston Christian Huskies women's basketball team represented Houston Christian University in the 2024–25 college basketball season. The Huskies, led by twelfth-year head coach Donna Finnie, played their home games at the Sharp Gymnasium in Houston, Texas as members of the Southland Conference. The Huskies compiled a 6–23 overall record and a 3–17 record in conference play—a twelfth-place finish—failing to qualify for the SLC tournament. Their season ended on March 1, 2025 with a 53–71 loss to Northwestern State.

== Media ==
Home games were broadcast on ESPN+.

== Preseason polls ==
=== Southland Conference Poll ===
The Southland Conference released its preseason poll on October 17, 2024. Receiving 51 overall votes, the Huskies were picked to finish twelfth in the conference.

Predicted finish	Team	Votes (1st place)
1	Lamar	236 (19)
2	Southeastern Louisiana	213 (5)
3	Texas A&M–Corpus Christi	200
4	Stephen F. Austin	193
5	Incarnate Word	149
6	Texas A&M–Commerce (renamed)	112
7	Nicholls	108
8	New Orleans	109
9	UT Rio Grande Valley	92
10	Northwestern State	67
11	McNeese	61
12	Houston Christian	51

=== Preseason All Conference ===
No Huskies were selected to a Preseason All-Conference team.

== Roster ==
2024–25 Houston Christian Huskies women's basketball team
Players
Coaches

Pos.	#	Name	Height	Year	Previous school	Hometown
G	0	Madelyne Davis	5 ft 11 in (1.8 m)	Fr	Ursuline Academy of Dallas	Plano, TX
F	1	Tiffany Tullis	5 ft 11 in (1.8 m)	Sr	Texas State	San Antonio, TX
G	2	Victoria Dixon	5 ft 5 in (1.65 m)	Jr	Alabama A&M	Grand Prairie, TX
G	3	Erin Maguire	5 ft 7 in (1.7 m)	So	Hun School of Princeton	Belfast, Northern Ireland
G	7	Makolla Bagayegou	5 ft 9 in (1.75 m)	So	Högsbo Basket	Gothenburg, Sweden
F	8	Amy Cotton	6 ft 0 in (1.83 m)	Sr	Immanuel College	North Adelaide, Australia
G	10	Hannah Fields	5 ft 10 in (1.78 m)	So	Norman North High School	Norman, OK
F	11	Jo Oly	6 ft 0 in (1.83 m)	Jr	Sportlycee Luxembourg	Ettelbruck, Luxembourg
G	13	Tove Caesar	6 ft 1 in (1.85 m)	So	Luleå Gymnasieskola BC	Stockholm, Sweden
F	20	Mariyah Brown	5 ft 10 in (1.78 m)	Fr	Summer Creek High School	Houston, TX
F	24	Kierra Prim	5 ft 9 in (1.75 m)	Sr	Central Arkansas	Overland Park, KS
G	30	Lyric Barr	6 ft 1 in (1.85 m)	So	Katy High School	Houston, TX
F	45	Kendall Beck	6 ft 2 in (1.88 m)	Fr	San Marcos Panthers	San Antonio, TX

Head coach

- Donna Finnie (Heriot–Watt)

Assistant coach(es)

- Taylor Reed (Louisiana Tech)
- Dianna Wilson-Jones (Midwestern State)
- Myles Sherman (TCU)
- Owen Adams (Denver)

Legend

- (C) Team captain
- (S) Suspended
- (I) Ineligible
- (W) Walk-on
- Injured
- Current redshirt

Roster
Last update: March 4, 2025

== Schedule and results ==
Date time, TV	Rank^{#}	Opponent^{#}	Result	Record	High points	High rebounds	High assists	Site (attendance) city, state
Regular season
November 5, 2024*; 6:30 p.m., ESPN+		at TCU	L 41–78	0–1	8 – E. Maguire	10 – J. Oly	3 – M. Davis	Schollmaier Arena (1,946); Fort Worth, TX
November 7, 2024*; 6:00 p.m., ESPN+		at Texas Tech	L 40–63	0–2	10 – K. Prim	9 – T. Tullis	1 – K. Prim	United Supermarkets Arena (4,609); Lubbock, TX
November 17, 2024*; 2:00 p.m., ESPN+		at Houston	L 52–54	0–3	12 – J. Oly	9 – T. Tullis	4 – A. Cotton	Fertitta Center (751); Houston, TX
November 21, 2024*; 6:00 p.m., ESPN+		Utah Tech	W 57–51	1–3	17 – E. Maguire	11 – H. Fields	4 – E. Maguire	Sharp Gymnasium (409); Houston, TX
November 26, 2024*; 6:00 p.m., ESPN+		Tarleton State	L 42–48	1–4	11 – J. Oly	20 – T. Tullis	3 – E. Maguire	Sharp Gymnasium (523); Houston, TX
December 1, 2024*; 3:00 p.m., ESPN+		Southwestern	W 62–49	2–4	23 – K. Beck	14 – K. Beck	6 – M. Davis	Sharp Gymnasium (326); Houston, TX
December 4, 2024*; 6:30 p.m., ESPN+		at Oklahoma State	L 39–93	2–5	8 – E. Maguire	8 – T. Tullis	2 – K. Prim	Gallagher-Iba Arena (1,777); Stillwater, OK
December 14, 2024; 1:00 p.m., ESPN+		East Texas A&M	W 62–56	3–5 (1–0)	17 – E. Maguire	14 – T. Tullis	6 – E. Maguire	Sharp Gymnasium (248); Houston, TX
December 17, 2024; 6:00 p.m., ESPN+		St. Thomas (TX)	W 46–44	4–5	19 – M. Brown	19 – M. Brown	1 – A. Cotton	Sharp Gymnasium (201); Houston, TX
December 20, 2024*; 1:00 p.m., ESPN+		Sam Houston	L 68–79	4–6	21 – K. Prim	9 – T. Tullis	5 – E. Maguire	Sharp Gymnasium (204); Houston, TX
December 29, 2024; 2:00 p.m., ESPN+		Northwestern State	L 51–57	4–7 (1–1)	11 – E. Maguire	7 – H. Fields	2 – E. Maguire	Sharp Gymnasium (311); Houston, TX
January 2, 2025; 6:30 p.m., ESPN+		at Stephen F. Austin	L 35–82	4–8 (1–2)	9 – E. Maguire	6 – A. Cotton	2 – V. Dixon	William R. Johnson Coliseum (857); Nacogdoches, TX
January 4, 2025; 3:00 p.m., ESPN+		at Lamar	L 29–69	4–9 (1–3)	8 – E. Maguire	9 – T. Tullis	2 – E. Maguire	Neches Arena (1,054); Beaumont, TX
January 9, 2025; 6:00 p.m., ESPN+		McNeese	L 51–61	4–10 (1–4)	22 – E. Maguire	8 – E. Maguire	3 – E. Maguire	Sharp Gymnasium (222); Houston, TX
January 11, 2025; 1:00 p.m., ESPN+		Incarnate Word	L 45–76	4–11 (1–5)	10 – K. Beck	5 – J. Oly	2 – E. Maguire	Sharp Gymnasium (208); Houston, TX
January 16, 2025; 6:00 p.m., ESPN+		Texas A&M–Corpus Christi	L 55–62	4–12 (1–6)	18 – V. Dixon	9 – T. Tullis	5 – E. Maguire	Sharp Gymnasium (331); Houston, TX
January 18, 2025; 1:00 p.m., ESPN+		UT Rio Grande Valley	W 67–64	5–12 (2–6)	16 – T. Tullis	10 – T. Tullis	5 – E. Maguire	Sharp Gymnasium (348); Houston, TX
January 25, 2025; 2:00 p.m., ESPN+		at New Orleans	L 55–62	5–13 (2–7)	12 – T. Tullis	10 – T. Tullis	3 – A. Cotton	Lakefront Arena (288); New Orleans, LA
January 27, 2025; 5:30 p.m., ESPN+		at Southeastern Louisiana	L 41–65	5–14 (2–8)	11 – K. Beck	6 – L. Barr	2 – J. Oly	Pride Roofing University Center (444); Hammond, LA
January 30, 2025; 6:30 p.m., ESPN+		at Nicholls	L 51–76	5–15 (2–9)	12 – K. Prim	6 – K. Prim	3 – E. Maguire	Stopher Gymnasium (362); Thibodaux, LA
February 1, 2025; 1:00 p.m., ESPN+		at Incarnate Word	L 55–68	5–16 (2–10)	14 – T. Tullis	9 – T. Tullis	3 – E. Maguire	McDermott Center; San Antonio, TX
February 6, 2025; 6:00 p.m., ESPN+		Southeastern Louisiana	L 38–51	5–17 (2–11)	7 – A. Cotton	5 – T. Tullis	2 – A. Cotton	Sharp Gymnasium (389); Houston, TX
February 8, 2025; 1:00 p.m., ESPN+		New Orleans	W 54–49	6–17 (3–11)	15 – T. Tullis	10 – A. Cotton	7 – A. Cotton	Sharp Gymnasium (324); Houston, TX
February 13, 2025; 10:30 p.m., ESPN+		at Texas A&M–Corpus Christi	L 54–74	6–18 (3–12)	15 – T. Tullis	10 – T. Tullis	2 – E. Maguire	American Bank Center (2,142); Corpus Christi, TX
February 15, 2025; 2:00 p.m., ESPN+		at UT Rio Grande Valley	L 55–58 ^{OT}	6–9 (3–13)	21 – E. Maguire	7 – T. Tullis	4 – A. Cotton	UTRGV Fieldhouse (933); Edinburg, TX
February 20, 2025; 6:00 p.m., ESPN+		Southeastern Louisiana	L 59–66	6–20 (3–14)	14 – T. Tullis	11 – T. Tullis	4 – A. Cotton	Sharp Gymnasium (349); Houston, TX
February 22, 2025; 1:00 p.m., ESPN+		Lamar	L 30–62	6–21 (3–15)	11 – T. Tullis	9 – T. Tullis	1 – M. Brown	Sharp Gymnasium (567); Houston, TX
February 27, 2025; 6:30 p.m., ESPN+		at East Texas A&M	L 45–53	6–22 (3–16)	14 – E. Maguire	9 – T. Tullis	2 – V. Dixon	The Field House (686); Commerce, TX
March 1, 2025; 2:30 p.m., ESPN+		at Northwestern State	L 53–71	6–23 (3–17)	12 – V. Dixon	13 – T. Tullis	4 – E. Maguire	Prather Coliseum (385); Natchitoches, LA
*Non-conference game. ^{#}Rankings from AP poll. (#) Tournament seedings in parentheses. All times are in Central.

== See also ==
- 2024–25 Houston Christian Huskies men's basketball team
