= 2024–25 Lamar Lady Cardinals basketball team =

Intercollegiate basketball season

2024–25 Lamar Lady Cardinals basketball
- Conference: Southland Conference
- Record: 22–8 (17–3 SLC)
- Head coach: Aqua Franklin (6th season)
- Assistant coaches: Charinee Mitchell (1st season); Raymond Patche (3rd season); Omar Sneed (3rd season)
- Home arena: Montagne Center (Capacity: 10,080)

2024–25 Southland Conference women's basketball standings
	Conf.				Overall
Team	W		L	PCT	W		L	PCT
Southeastern Louisiana	19	–	1	.950	26	–	6	.813
Lamar	17	–	3	.850	22	–	8	.733
Stephen F. Austin †	16	–	4	.800	29	–	6	.829
Incarnate Word	12	–	8	.600	18	–	14	.563
Northwestern State	12	–	8	.600	16	–	16	.500
UT Rio Grande Valley	11	–	9	.550	16	–	16	.500
Nicholls	9	–	11	.450	17	–	14	.548
Texas A&M–Corpus Christi	7	–	13	.350	15	–	17	.469
New Orleans	5	–	15	.250	5	–	24	.172
McNeese	5	–	15	.250	10	–	21	.323
East Texas A&M*	4	–	16	.200	7	–	22	.241
Houston Christian	3	–	17	.150	6	–	23	.207
† 2025 Southland tournament winner * ineligible for the 2025 NCAA tournament due to transition from Division II

The 2024–25 Lamar Lady Cardinals basketball team represented Lamar University during the 2024–25 NCAA Division I women's basketball season. The Lady Cardinals, led by sixth year head coach Aqua Franklin, played their home games at the Montagne Center in Beaumont, Texas as members of the Southland Conference.

== Media ==
Home games are broadcast on ESPN+.

== Preseason polls ==
=== Southland Conference Poll ===
The Southland Conference released its preseason poll on October 17, 2024. Receiving 236 overall votes and 19 first-place votes, the Lady Cardinals were picked to finish first in the conference.

Predicted finish	Team	Votes (1st place)
1	Lamar	236 (19)
2	Southeastern Louisiana	213 (5)
3	Texas A&M–Corpus Christi	200
4	Stephen F. Austin	193
5	Incarnate Word	149
6	Texas A&M–Commerce (renamed)	112
7	Nicholls	108
8	New Orleans	109
9	UT Rio Grande Valley	92
10	Northwestern State	67
11	McNeese	61
12	Houston Christian	51

=== Preseason All Conference ===
Akasha Davis and Sabria Dean were selected to the Preseason All-Conference first team.

== Roster ==
2024–25 Lamar Lady Cardinals women's basketball team
Players
Coaches

Pos.	#	Name	Height	Year	Hometown
G/F	0	T'Aaliyah Miner	5 ft 11 in (1.8 m)	Sr	New Orleans, Louisiana
G	1	Jacei Denley	5 ft 7 in (1.7 m)	So	Beaumont, Texas
G	3	Sabria Dean	5 ft 7 in (1.7 m)	GS	Mineola, Texas
G	4	Kamryn Wilson	5 ft 9 in (1.75 m)	Fr	Grand Prairie, Texas
G	5	Cameron Dill	5 ft 8 in (1.73 m)	So	Beaumont, Texas
G	8	KJ Walker	5 ft 8 in (1.73 m)	Jr	Fort Worth, Texas
F	13	Taliah Hill	6 ft 0 in (1.83 m)	Sr	Arlington, Texas
G/F	20	Justice Rossl	6 ft 0 in (1.83 m)	GS	Des Moines, Iowa
F	22	NJ Weems	6 ft 1 in (1.85 m)	GS	Minneapolis, Minnesota
C	25	Bebe Galloway	5 ft 11 in (1.8 m)	GS	Galveston, Texas
G	30	R'Mani Taylor	5 ft 6 in (1.68 m)	Jr	Houston, Texas
F/C	41	Akasha Davis	6 ft 2 in (1.88 m)	Sr	Dallas, Texas

Head coach

- Aqua Franklin (Texas A&M)

Assistant coach(es)

- Charinee Mitchell (Southeastern Louisiana)
- Raymond Patche (Arizona State)
- Omar Sneed (San Jacinto/Memphis)

Legend

- (C) Team captain
- (S) Suspended
- (I) Ineligible
- (W) Walk-on
- Injured
- Current redshirt

Roster
Last update: December 22, 2024

== Schedule ==
Date time, TV	Rank^{#}	Opponent^{#}	Result	Record	High points	High rebounds	High assists	Site (attendance) city, state
Exhibition
Oct 26, 2024; 2:00 pm		East Texas Baptist	W 70–39		–	–	–	Neches Arena; Beaumont, Texas
Regular season
Nov 4, 2024*; 11:00 am, ESPN+		Texas A&M–San Antonio	W 98–62	1–0	21 – A. Davis	8 – S. Dean	8 – S. Dean	Neches Arena (2,000); Beaumont, Texas
Nov 13, 2024*; 7:00 pm, ESPN+		at No. 4 Texas	L 58–95	1–1	14 – A. Davis	3 – A. Davis	4 – R. Taylor	Moody Center (6,243); Austin, Texas
Nov 22, 2024*; 4:30 pm, ESPN+		at SMU	L 54–56 ^{OT}	1–2	21 – S. Dean	10 – A. Davis	4 – S. Dean	Moody Coliseum (802); Dallas, Texas
Nov 29, 2024*; 3:30 pm		vs. Pacific; New Orleans Big Easy Classic	W 69–54	2–2	19 – J. Denley	16 – A. Davis	7 – J. Denley	Alario Center (176); New Orleans, Louisiana
Nov 30, 2024*; 1:00 pm		vs. Cleveland State; New Orleans Big Easy Classic	L 52–79	2–3	15 – A. Davis	6 – T. Miner	4 – R. Taylor	Alario Center (127); New Orleans, Louisiana
Dec 4, 2024*; 7:00 pm, ESPN+		University of St. Thomas (Texas)	W 94–32	3–3	13 – T. Miner	8 – T. Miner	6 – R. Taylor	Neches Arena (657); Beaumont, Texas
Dec 7, 2024*; 2:00 pm, ESPN+		Louisiana–Monroe	W 71–60	4–3	15 – S. Dean	11 – A. Davis	5 – J. Denley	Neches Arena (599); Beaumont, Texas
Dec 14, 2024; 2:00 pm, ESPN+		at UT Rio Grande Valley	W 69–44	5–3 (1–0)	20 – J. Denley	6 – S. Dean	4 – N. Weems	UTRGV Fieldhouse (410); Edinburg, Texas
Dec 17, 2024*; 11:30 am, ESPN+		at Texas Tech	L 67–73	5–4	21 – N. Weems	8 – Tied	3 – S. Dean	United Supermarkets Arena (13,106); Lubbock, Texas
Dec 21, 2024*; 1:00 pm, ESPN+		Northern Colorado	W 60–43	6–4	18 – J. Denley	5 – T. Miner	5 – R. Taylor	Neches Arena (750); Beaumont, Texas
Jan 2, 2025; 7:00 pm, ESPN+		Incarnate Word	W 69–47	7–4 (2–0)	18 – S. Dean	9 – T. Miner	3 – S. Dean	Neches Arena (463); Beaumont, Texas
Jan 4, 2025; 3:00 pm, ESPN+		Houston Christian	W 69–29	8–4 (3–0)	13 – A. Davis	9 – A. Davis	5 – R. Taylor	Neches Arena (1,054); Beaumont, Texas
Jan 9, 2025; 7:00 pm, ESPN+		New Orleans	W 94–52	9–4 (4–0)	24 – S. Dean	5 – N. Weems	5 – J. Denley	Neches Arena (852); Beaumont, Texas
Jan 11, 2025; 3:00 pm, ESPN+		Stephen F. Austin	W 77–74	10–4 (5–0)	26 – N. Weems	10 – A. Davis	5 – J. Denley	Neches Arena; Beaumont, Texas
Jan 16, 2025; 6:30 pm, ESPN+		at Nicholls	W 67–53	11–4 (6–0)	19 – S. Dean	6 – S. Dean	4 – K. Wilson	Stopher Gymnasium (345); Thibodaux, Louisiana
Jan 18, 2025; 1:00 pm, ESPN+		at McNeese; Battle of the Border (Rivalry)	W 68–52	12–4 (7–0)	20 – A. Davis	9 – A. Davis	8 – R. Taylor	The Legacy Center (2,123); Lake Charles, Louisiana
Jan 25, 2025; 3:00 pm, ESPN+		East Texas A&M	W 83–65	13–4 (8–0)	23 – S. Dean	16 – A. Davis	5 – N. Weems	Neches Arena (1,012); Beaumont, Texas
Jan 27, 2025; 4:00 pm, ESPN+		Northwestern State	W 59–55	14–4 (9–0)	21 – A. Davis	18 – A. Davis	3 – S. Dean	Neches Arena (957); Beaumont, Texas
Jan 30, 2025; 6:00 pm, ESPN+		at Southeastern Louisiana	L 48–60	14–5 (9–1)	15 – N. Weems	9 – A. Davis	4 – S. Dean	Pride Roofing University Center (1,669); Hammond, Louisiana
Feb 1, 2025; 5:30 pm, ESPN+		at Stephen F. Austin	L 66–72	14–6 (9–2)	29 – S. Dean	6 – N. Weems	3 – R. Taylor	William R. Johnson Coliseum (1,113); Nacogdoches, Texas
Feb 6, 2025; 7:00 pm, ESPN+		Texas A&M–Corpus Christi	W 63–57	15–6 (10–2)	15 – S. Dean	15 – A. Davis	5 – R. Taylor	Neches Arena (781); Beaumont, Texas
Feb 8, 2025; 3:00 pm, ESPN+		UT Rio Grande Valley	L 56–58	15–7 (10–3)	23 – S. Dean	7 – A. Davis	5 – J. Denley	Neches Arena (598); Beaumont, Texas
Feb 13, 2025; 6:30 pm, ESPN+		at Northwestern State	W 58–46	16–7 (11–3)	18 – S. Dean	6 – S. Dean	4 – J. Denley	Prather Coliseum (571); Natchitoches, Louisiana
Feb 15, 2025; 12:00 pm, ESPN+		at East Texas A&M	W 71–57	17–7 (12–3)	18 – A. Davis	13 – A. Davis	5 – S. Dean	The Field House (377); Commerce, Texas
Feb 20, 2025; 6:30 pm, ESPN+		at Incarnate Word	W 61–53	18–7 (13–3)	18 – A. Davis	10 – A. Davis	3 – J. Denley	McDermott Center; San Antonio, Texas
Feb 22, 2025; 1:00 pm, ESPN+		at Houston Christian	W 62–30	19–7 (14–3)	18 – A. Davis	16 – A. Davis	4 – S. Dean	Sharp Gymnasium (567); Houston, Texas
Feb 27, 2025; 7:00 pm, ESPN+		Nicholls	W 68–49	20–7 (15–3)	18 – A. Davis	13 – A. Davis	5 – J. Denley	Neches Arena (943); Beaumont, Texas
Mar 1, 2025; 3:00 pm, ESPN+		McNeese; Battle of the Border (Rivalry)	W 69–60	21–7 (16–3)	17 – A. Davis	11 – A. Davis	4 – K. Wilson	Neches Arena; Beaumont, Texas
Mar 5, 2025; 7:00 pm, ESPN+		at Texas A&M–Corpus Christi	W 71–54	22–7 (17–3)	15 – S. Dean	9 – A. Davis	6 – J. Denley	American Bank Center (1,332); Corpus Christi, Texas
2025 Jersey Mike's Subs Southland Conference Tournament
Mar 12, 2025; 1:00 pm, ESPN+	(2)	vs. (3) Stephen F. Austin; Semifinals	L 53–61	22–8	18 – A. Davis	12 – A. Davis	6 – R. Taylor	The Legacy Center (1,000); Lake Charles, LA
*Non-conference game. ^{#}Rankings from AP Poll. (#) Tournament seedings in parentheses. All times are in Central Time.

== Conference awards and honors ==
=== Weekly awards ===
Weekly honors
Honors	Player	Position	Date Awarded	Ref.
SLC Women's Basketball Player of the Week	Jacei Denley	G	December 16, 2024	
SLC Women's Basketball Player of the Week	Sabria Dean	G	January 13, 2025	
SLC Women's Basketball Player of the Week	Akasha Davis	F/C	January 28, 2025	

== See also ==
2024–25 Lamar Cardinals basketball team
