= 2024–25 Incarnate Word Cardinals women's basketball team =

Intercollegiate basketball season

2024–25 Incarnate Word Cardinals women's basketball

WNIT, First Round
- Conference: Southland Conference
- Record: 18–14 (12–8 Southland)
- Head coach: Jeff Dow (regular season); Amber Cunningham (WNIT)
- Assistant coaches: Amber Cunningham; Rachel Baity; Steven Oliver; Wade Whaley
- Home arena: McDermott Center

2024–25 Southland Conference women's basketball standings
	Conf.				Overall
Team	W		L	PCT	W		L	PCT
Southeastern Louisiana	19	–	1	.950	26	–	6	.813
Lamar	17	–	3	.850	22	–	8	.733
Stephen F. Austin †	16	–	4	.800	29	–	6	.829
Incarnate Word	12	–	8	.600	18	–	14	.563
Northwestern State	12	–	8	.600	16	–	16	.500
UT Rio Grande Valley	11	–	9	.550	16	–	16	.500
Nicholls	9	–	11	.450	17	–	14	.548
Texas A&M–Corpus Christi	7	–	13	.350	15	–	17	.469
New Orleans	5	–	15	.250	5	–	24	.172
McNeese	5	–	15	.250	10	–	21	.323
East Texas A&M*	4	–	16	.200	7	–	22	.241
Houston Christian	3	–	17	.150	6	–	23	.207
† 2025 Southland tournament winner * ineligible for the 2025 NCAA tournament due to transition from Division II

The 2024–25 Incarnate Word Cardinals women's basketball team represented the University of the Incarnate Word in the 2024–25 NCAA Division I women's basketball season. The Cardinals were led by sixth-year coach Jeff Dow, and are members of the Southland Conference (SLC). The season was surprisingly followed up with Dow not having his contract renewed.

== Media ==
Home games were broadcast on ESPN+.

== Preseason polls ==
=== Southland Conference Poll ===
The Southland Conference released its preseason poll on October 17, 2024. Receiving 149 overall votes, the Cardinals were picked to finish fifth in the conference.

Predicted finish	Team	Votes (1st place)
1	Lamar	236 (19)
2	Southeastern Louisiana	213 (5)
3	Texas A&M–Corpus Christi	200
4	Stephen F. Austin	193
5	Incarnate Word	149
6	Texas A&M–Commerce (renamed)	112
7	Nicholls	108
8	New Orleans	109
9	UT Rio Grande Valley	92
10	Northwestern State	67
11	McNeese	61
12	Houston Christian	51

=== Preseason All Conference ===
No Cardinals were selected to a Preseason All-Conference team.

== Roster ==
2024–25 Incarnate Word Cardinals women's basketball team
Players
Coaches

Pos.	#	Name	Height	Year	Previous school	Hometown
G	1	Dorian Norris	5 ft 11 in (1.8 m)	GS	Texas A&M–Commerce	Lake Dallas, Texas
F	2	Kaylee Howell	6 ft 2 in (1.88 m)	Jr	Rockport-Fulton High School	Rockport, Texas
G	3	Shiho Isono	5 ft 6 in (1.68 m)	Sr	Southern Utah	Dazaifu, Fukuoka, Japan
G	4	Brynn Lusby	5 ft 10 in (1.78 m)	Fr	Panther Creek High School	Frisco, Texas
G	5	Myra Bell	5 ft 10 in (1.78 m)	GS	Taft High School	San Antonio, Texas
G	10	Eryn McKinzie	5 ft 10 in (1.78 m)	Fr	Brewer High School	Fort Worth, Texas
G	12	Izzy Majarucon	5 ft 6 in (1.68 m)	Fr	Dream City High School	Phoenix, Arizona
F	14	Brenna Perez	6 ft 0 in (1.83 m)	GS	Veterans Memorial High School	San Antonio, Texas
F	21	Mallory McQuietor	6 ft 1 in (1.85 m)	So	Keller High School	Keller, Texas
G	22	Breelyn Sanborn	5 ft 11 in (1.8 m)	Jr	St. Pius X High School	Spring, Texas
G	23	Deja Lumsden	5 ft 10 in (1.78 m)	Jr	Weatherford College	Fort Worth, Texas
G	24	Destiny Whitaker	5 ft 10 in (1.78 m)	So	Mansfield Summit High School	Dallas, Texas
G	32	Jorja Elliott	5 ft 11 in (1.8 m)	Jr	Lake Dallas High School	Hickory Creek, Texas
F	34	Grace Okih	6 ft 2 in (1.88 m)	Jr	Jacksonville College	Lagos, Nigeria
F	35	Raimi McCrary	6 ft 0 in (1.83 m)	So	Allen High School	Allen, Texas
G	55	Madison Cockrell	5 ft 4 in (1.63 m)	Jr	UTSA	Dallas, Texas

Head coach

- Jeff Dow (Oregon)

Assistant coach(es)

- Amber Cunningham (Rice)
- Rachel Baity (Our Lady of the Lake)
- Steven Oliver (Geneva)
- Wade Whaley (West Texas A&M)

Legend

- (C) Team captain
- (S) Suspended
- (I) Ineligible
- (W) Walk-on
- Injured
- Current redshirt

Roster
Last update: March 2, 2025

== Schedule ==
Date time, TV	Rank^{#}	Opponent^{#}	Result	Record	High points	High rebounds	High assists	Site (attendance) city, state
Regular season games
Nov 4, 2024*; 6:00 pm, ESPN+		at Texas Tech	L 48–78	0–1	10 – J. Elliott	5 – R. McCrary	1 – J. Elliott	United Supermarkets Arena (3,584); Lubbock, TX
Nov 7, 2024*; 7:00 pm, ESPN+		at No. 12 Baylor	L 33–85	0–2	10 – B. Lusby	4 – D. Norris	2 – M. Cockrell	Foster Pavilion (3,332); Waco, TX
Nov 11, 2024*; 6:30 pm, ESPN+		Nelson	W 85–54	1–2	15 – J. Elliott	8 – M. McQuietor	8 – J. Elliott	McDermott Center (208); San Antonio, TX
Nov 14, 2024*; 11:00 am, ESPN+		Texas Lutheran	W 57–51	2–2	11 – B. Lusby	8 – B. Lusby	2 – M. Cockrell	McDermott Center; San Antonio, TX
Nov 18, 2024*; 7:00 pm, ESPN+		Prairie View A&M	W 68–49	3–2	18 – M. Bell	8 – M. Bell	5 – M. Cockrell	McDermott Center (94); San Antonio, TX
Nov 21, 2024*; 12:00 pm, ESPN+		at No. 19 TCU	L 43–81	3–3	8 – R. McCrary	5 – R. McCrary	2 – J. Elliott	Schollmaier Arena (5,379); Fort Worth, TX
Nov 24, 2024*; 1:00 pm, ESPN+		Abilene Christian	L 53–61	3–4	17 – R. McCrary	13 – R. McCrary	4 – S. Isono	McDermott Center (123); San Antonio, TX
Dec 6, 2024; 1:00 pm, ESPN+		Northwestern State	W 48–46	4–4 (1–0)	22 – J. Elliott	10 – R. McCrary	3 – M. Bell	McDermott Center; San Antonio, TX
Dec 14, 2024; 1:00 pm, ESPN+		Schreiner	W 93–36	5–4	23 – B. Lusby	7 – R. McCrary	4 – D. Whitaker	McDermott Center (100); San Antonio, TX
Dec 20, 2024; 1:00 pm, ESPN+		East Texas A&M	W 76–55	6–4 (2–0)	16 – R. McCrary	10 – R. McCrary	5 – S. Isono	McDermott Center (76); San Antonio, TX
Dec 29, 2024*; 1:00 pm, ESPN+		Our Lady of the Lake	W 104–37	7–4	19 – D. Whitaker	12 – B. Lusby	5 – J. Elliott	McDermott Center; San Antonio, TX
Jan 2, 2025; 7:00 pm, ESPN+		at Lamar	L 47–69	7–5 (2–1)	11 – E. McKinzie	4 – M. Cockrell	4 – S. Isono	Neches Arena (463); Beaumont, TX
Jan 4, 2025; 2:00 pm, ESPN+		at Stephen F. Austin	L 60–67	7–6 (2–2)	13 – D. Norris	11 – D. Norris	4 – M. Bell	William R. Johnson Coliseum (996); Nacogdoches, TX
Jan 9, 2025; 6:30 pm, ESPN+		Nicholls	L 57–68	7–7 (2–3)	14 – J. Elliot	10 – R. McCrary	4 – M. Bell	McDermott Center (66); San Antonio, TX
Jan 11, 2025; 1:00 pm, ESPN+		at Houston Christian	W 76–45	8–7 (3–3)	15 – B. Lusby	6 – R. McCrary	4 – M. Bell	Sharp Gymnasium (208); Houston, TX
Jan 16, 2025; 6:30 pm, ESPN+		UT Rio Grande Valley	W 52–43	9–7 (4–3)	14 – D. Whitaker	8 – D. Norris	2 – D. Norris	McDermott Center (117); San Antonio, TX
Jan 18, 2025; 1:00 pm, ESPN+		Texas A&M–Corpus Christi	W 76–58	10–7 (5–3)	16 – J. Elliott	9 – R. McCrary	7 – R. McCrary	McDermott Center (231); San Antonio, TX
Jan 25, 2025; 1:00 pm, ESPN+		at Southeastern Louisiana	L 42–66	10–8 (5–4)	11 – D. Whitaker	4 – E. McKinzie	3 – D. Norris	Lakefront Arena (619); New Orleans, LA
Jan 27, 2025; 4:00 pm, ESPN+		at New Orleans; Rescheduled from January 22	W 58–55	11–8 (6–4)	15 – B. Lusby	6 – J. Elliott	5 – J. Elliott	Lakefront Arena (137); New Orleans, LA
Jan 30, 2025; 6:00 pm, ESPN+		at McNeese	W 77–63	12–8 (7–4)	17 – J. Elliott	8 – J. Elliott	2 – J. Elliott	The Legacy Center (1,342); Lake Charles, LA
Feb 1, 2025; 1:00 pm, ESPN+		Houston Christian	W 68–55	13–8 (8–4)	18 – R. McCrary	9 – D. Norris	18 – R. McCrary	McDermott Center; San Antonio, TX
Feb 6, 2025; 6:30 pm, ESPN+		Southeastern Louisiana	W 71–60	14–8 (9–4)	20 – D. Whitaker	8 – D. Whitaker	4 – R. McCrary	McDermott Center (118); San Antonio, TX
Feb 8, 2025; 1:00 pm, ESPN+		Southeastern Louisiana	L 43–62	14–9 (9–5)	10 – B. Lusby	7 – D. Norris	3 – S. Isono	McDermott Center (136); San Antonio, TX
Feb 13, 2025; 6:30 pm, ESPN+		at UT Rio Grande Valley	L 37–59	14–10 (9–6)	8 – D. Whitaker	7 – D. Norris	2 – M. Cockrell	UTRGV Fieldhouse (1,061); Edinburg, TX
Feb 15, 2025; 1:00 pm, ESPN+		at Texas A&M–Corpus Christi	L 53–55 ^{OT}	15–10 (10–6)	18 – M. Bell	8 – M. Bell	4 – M. Cockrell	American Bank Center (1,308); Corpus Christi, TX
Feb 20, 2025; 6:30 pm, ESPN+		Lamar	L 53–61	15–11 (10–7)	13 – M. Bell	9 – J. Elliott	3 – J. Elliott	McDermott Center; San Antonio, TX
Feb 22, 2025; 1:00 pm, ESPN+		Stephen F. Austin	L 68–73	15–12 (10–8)	20 – B. Lusby	10 – D. Norris	4 – M. Bell	McDermott Center (191); San Antonio, TX
Feb 27, 2025; 6:30 pm, ESPN+		at Northwestern State	W 71–64	16–12 (11–8)	13 – J. Elliott	8 – J. Elliott	2 – J. Elliott	Prather Coliseum (726); Natchitoches, LA
Mar 1, 2025; 12:00 pm, ESPN+		at East Texas A&M	W 74–65	17–12 (12–8)	17 – B. Lusby	12 – M. Bell	6 – R. McCrary	The Field House (347); Commerce, TX
2025 Jersey Mike's Subs Southland Conference Tournament (1–1)
Mar 11, 2025; 11:00 am, ESPN+	(4)	vs. (5) Northwestern State; Quarterfinals	W 69–54	18–12	14 – D. Norris	11 – R. McCrary	5 – J. Elliott	The Legacy Center; Lake Charles, LA
Mar 12, 2025; 10:30 am, ESPN+	(4)	vs. (1) Southeastern Louisiana; Semifinals	L 37–57	18–13	12 – J. Elliott	5 – Tied	1 – Tied - 5 players	The Legacy Center; Lake Charles, LA
WNIT
Mar 20, 2025; 6:30 pm, ESPN+		at UT Arlington; First Round	L 52–78	18–14	15 – Whitaker	9 – Norris	4 – Norris	College Park Center (1,167); Arlington, TX
*Non-conference game. ^{#}Rankings from AP poll. (#) Tournament seedings in parentheses. All times are in Central.

== Conference awards and honors ==
=== Weekly awards ===
Weekly honors
Honors	Player	Position	Date Awarded	Ref.
SLC Women's Basketball Player of the Week	Jorja Elliott	G	December 9, 2024	

== See also ==
- 2024–25 Incarnate Word Cardinals men's basketball team
