= 2024–25 New Orleans Privateers women's basketball team =

Intercollegiate basketball season

2024–25 New Orleans Privateers women's basketball
- Conference: Southland Conference
- Record: 5–24 (5–15 Southland)
- Head coach: Trelanne Powell (2nd season)
- Assistant coaches: Brittany White; Lonnika Thompson; Kate Zhibareva
- Home arena: Lakefront Arena

2024–25 Southland Conference women's basketball standings
	Conf.				Overall
Team	W		L	PCT	W		L	PCT
Southeastern Louisiana	19	–	1	.950	26	–	6	.813
Lamar	17	–	3	.850	22	–	8	.733
Stephen F. Austin †	16	–	4	.800	29	–	6	.829
Incarnate Word	12	–	8	.600	18	–	14	.563
Northwestern State	12	–	8	.600	16	–	16	.500
UT Rio Grande Valley	11	–	9	.550	16	–	16	.500
Nicholls	9	–	11	.450	17	–	14	.548
Texas A&M–Corpus Christi	7	–	13	.350	15	–	17	.469
New Orleans	5	–	15	.250	5	–	24	.172
McNeese	5	–	15	.250	10	–	21	.323
East Texas A&M*	4	–	16	.200	7	–	22	.241
Houston Christian	3	–	17	.150	6	–	23	.207
† 2025 Southland tournament winner * ineligible for the 2025 NCAA tournament due to transition from Division II

The 2024–25 New Orleans Privateers women's basketball team represented the University of New Orleans (UNO) during the 2024–25 NCAA Division I women's basketball season. The Privateers were led by second-year head coach Trelanne Powell and played their home games at the Lakefront Arena located on the UNO campus in New Orleans, Louisiana as members of the Southland Conference. The Privateers finished the 2024–25 season 5–24, 5–15 in conference play to finish in a two way tie for ninth place. Failing to qualify for the SLC tournament, the Privateers' season ended with a 73–71 victory over the McNeese.

== Media ==
Home games are broadcast on ESPN+.

== Preseason polls ==
=== Southland Conference Poll ===
The Southland Conference released its preseason poll on October 17, 2024. Receiving 109 overall votes, the Privateers were picked to finish eighth in the conference.

Predicted finish	Team	Votes (1st place)
1	Lamar	236 (19)
2	Southeastern Louisiana	213 (5)
3	Texas A&M–Corpus Christi	200
4	Stephen F. Austin	193
5	Incarnate Word	149
6	Texas A&M–Commerce (renamed)	112
7	Nicholls	108
8	New Orleans	109
9	UT Rio Grande Valley	92
10	Northwestern State	67
11	McNeese	61
12	Houston Christian	51

=== Preseason All-Conference ===
No Privateers were selected as a Preseason All-Conference team member.

== Roster ==
2024–25 New Orleans Privateers women's basketball team
Players
Coaches

Pos.	#	Name	Height	Year	Previous school	Hometown
C	0	Nora Francois	6 ft 2 in (1.88 m)	Sr	North Iowa Area Community College	Minneapolis, Minnesota
G	1	Shanihya Brown	5 ft 5 in (1.65 m)	Jr	Morton College	Chicago, Illinois
F	2	Sephora Kayolo	6 ft 1 in (1.85 m)	Sr	Oral Roberts	Kinshasa, DR Congo
G	3	Syria Butler	5 ft 6 in (1.68 m)	Sr	Purdue Northwest	Dolton, Illinois
G	5	Alexis Calderon	5 ft 3 in (1.6 m)	Sr	Labette Community College	Jacksonville, Texas
G/F	10	Jasmine Jones	5 ft 11 in (1.8 m)	Jr	Chipola College	Carrollton, Georgia
G	11	Brialle Washington	5 ft 7 in (1.7 m)	Jr	Indian River State College	Rayne, Louisiana
G	12	Gabbi Cartagena	5 ft 8 in (1.73 m)	GS	Troy	Jackson, Georgia
F	14	Chenai Mushore	6 ft 4 in (1.93 m)	Jr	Arizona Western College	West Sussex, England
G	21	Aaliyah Ellis	5 ft 9 in (1.75 m)	RS Sr	Weber State	Cibolo, Texas
G/F	22	Mackenzie Joseph	5 ft 11 in (1.8 m)	Jr	Western Nebraska Community College	Vinton, Louisiana
G	23	Tre'Miyah Berry	5 ft 9 in (1.75 m)	Fr	Rockdale County High School	Conyers, Georgia
F	24	Arial Ford	6 ft 2 in (1.88 m)	Jr	Lake Michigan College	Indianapolis, Indiana
G	32	Brianna Ellis	5 ft 8 in (1.73 m)	Sr	Flagler Palm Coast High School	Palm Coast, Florida
G	33	Jayla Kimbrough	5 ft 9 in (1.75 m)	RS Jr	Austin Peay	Decatur, Georgia

Head coach

- Trelanne Powell (Columbus State)

Assistant coach(es)

- Brittany White (Augusta)
- Lonnika Wilson (Florida)
- Kate Zhibareva (East Texas A&M)

Legend

- (C) Team captain
- (S) Suspended
- (I) Ineligible
- (W) Walk-on
- Injured
- Current redshirt

Roster
Last update: March 4, 2025

== Schedule ==
Date time, TV	Rank^{#}	Opponent^{#}	Result	Record	High points	High rebounds	High assists	Site (attendance) city, state
Non-conference regular season
November 4, 2024*; 5:00 p.m., SECN+		at No. 24 Alabama	L 53–115	0–1	11 – J. Kimbrough	9 – N. Francois	6 – A. Calderon	Coleman Coliseum (2,710); Tuscaloosa, AL
November 10, 2024*; 2:00 p.m., ESPN+		at TCU	L 52–107	0–2	10 – J. Jones	6 – A. Calderon	9 – A. Calderon	Schollmaier Arena (1,895); Fort Worth, TX
November 12, 2024*; 11:00 a.m., ESPN+		at Tarleton State	L 48–57	0–3	16 – J. Kimbrough	8 – N. Francois	2 – A. Calderon	Wisdom Gym (840); Stephenville, TX
November 19, 2024*; 11:00 a.m., ESPN+		South Alabama	L 57–67	0–4	13 – J. Kimbrough	11 – M. Joseph	4 – A. Calderon	Lakefront Arena (1,865); New Orleans, LA
November 23, 2024*; 2:00 p.m., ESPN+		at Texas Tech	L 70–78	0–5	19 – J. Kimbrough	17 – N. Francois	3 – A. Calderon	United Supermarkets Arena (4,130); Lubbock, TX
November 26, 2024*; 6:00 p.m., ESPN+		at Louisiana	L 46–61	0–6	11 – J. Kimbrough	7 – N. Francois	3 – A. Calderon	Cajundome (524); Lafayette, LA
November 29, 2024*; 2:00 p.m., ESPN+		at Baylor	L 58–84	0–7	26 – N. Francois	4 – G. Cartegena	5 – A. Calderon	Foster Pavilion (3,406); Waco, TX
December 18, 2024*; 11:00 a.m., ESPN+		at UAB	L 60–66	0–8	26 – N. Francois	4 – G. Cartegena	5 – A. Calderon	Bartow Arena (984); Birmingham, AL
December 20, 2024*; 4:30 p.m., ESPN+		at Jacksonville State	L 47–57	0–9	15 – N. Francois	8 – J. Joseph	2 – S. Butler	Pete Mathews Coliseum (189); Jacksonville, AL
Conference regular season
December 22, 2024; 3:00 p.m., ESPN+		at Nicholls	L 61–65	0–10 (0–1)	16 – N. Francois	10 – N. Francois	9 – A. Calderon	Stopher Gymnasium (400); Thibodaux, LA
January 2, 2025; 6:30 p.m., ESPN+		Texas A&M–Corpus Christi	L 66–78	0–11 (0–2)	24 – N. Francois	10 – J. Kimbrough	5 – A. Calderon	Lakefront Arena (389); New Orleans, LA
January 4, 2025; 2:00 p.m., ESPN+		UT Rio Grande Valley	L 62–64	0–12 (0–3)	16 – A. Calderon	9 – G. Cartagena	5 – A. Calderon	Lakefront Arena (345); New Orleans, LA
January 9, 2025; 7:00 p.m., ESPN+		at Lamar	L 52–94	0–13 (0–4)	15 – J. Kimbrough	10 – J. Kimbrough	3 – A. Calderon	Neches Arena (852); Beaumont, TX
January 11, 2025; 2:00 p.m., ESPN+		Southeastern Louisiana	L 53–83	0–14 (0–5)	13 – B. Washington	5 – G. Cartegena	5 – B. 5Washington	Lakefront Arena (349); New Orleans, LA
January 16, 2025; 6:30 p.m., ESPN+		at Northwestern State	L 66–83	0–15 (0–6)	18 – B. Washington	12 – C. Mushore	3 – A. Calderon	Prather Coliseum (434); Natchitoches, LA
January 18, 2025; 12:00 p.m., ESPN+		at East Texas A&M	W 66–62 ^{OT}	1–15 (1–6)	15 – A. Calderon	10 – J. Kimbrough	4 – J. Kimbrough	The Field House (364); Commerce, TX
January 25, 2025; 2:00 p.m., ESPN+		Houston Christian	W 62–55	2–15 (2–6)	23 – J. Kimbrough	7 – J. Kimbrough	5 – A. Calderon	Lakefront Arena (288); New Orleans, LA
January 27, 2025; 4:00 pm, ESPN+		Incarnate Word; Rescheduled from January 22	L 55–58	2–16 (2–7)	17 – A. Calderon	7 – A. Calderon	4 – A. Calderon	Lakefront Arena (137); New Orleans, LA
January 30, 2025; 6:30 p.m., ESPN+		Stephen F. Austin	L 65–83	2–17 (2–8)	21 – N. Francois	9 – N. Francois	4 – G. Cartagena	Lakefront Arena (389); New Orleans, LA
February 1, 2025; 1:00 p.m., ESPN+		at Southeastern Louisiana	L 50–59	2–18 (2–9)	18 – J. Jones	12 – N. Francois	8 – A. Calderon	Pride Roofing University Center (708); Hammond, LA
February 6, 2025; 6:30 p.m., ESPN+		at Incarnate Word	L 60–71	2–19 (2–10)	15 – J. Jones	7 – J. Kimbrough	3 – J. Jones	McDermott Center (118); San Antonio, TX
February 8, 2025; 1:00 p.m., ESPN+		at Houston Christian	L 49–54	2–20 (2–11)	13 – N. Francois	7 – N. Francois	2 – S. Brown	Sharp Gymnasium (324); Houston, TX
February 13, 2025; 6:30 p.m., ESPN+		Nicholls	L 59–72	2–21 (2–12)	13 – N. Francois	7 – N. Francois	3 – S. Brown	Lakefront Arena (397); New Orleans, LA
February 15, 2025; 2:00 p.m., ESPN+		McNeese	L 66–71	2–22 (2–13)	21 – N. Francois	11 – N. Francois	4 – A. Calderon	Lakefront Arena (372); New Orleans, LA
February 20, 2025; 6:30 p.m., ESPN+		East Texas A&M	W 78–52	3–22 (3–13)	19 – N. Francois	19 – N. Francois	10 – N. Francois	Lakefront Arena (402); New Orleans, LA
February 22, 2025; 2:00 p.m., ESPN+		Northwestern State	L 74–76	3–23 (3–14)	20 – N. Francois	6 – N. Francois	4 – A. Calderon	Lakefront Arena (369); New Orleans, LA
March 1, 2025; 2:00 p.m., ESPN+		at UT Rio Grande Valley	W 72–59	4–24 (4–15)	16 – N. Francois	9 – N. Francois	3 – N. Francois	UTRGV Fieldhouse (863); Edinburg, TX
March 4, 2025; 1:00 p.m., ESPN+		at McNeese	W 73–71	5–24 (5–15)	24 – N. Francois	9 – N. Francois	3 – S. Butler	The Legacy Center (1,394); Lake Charles, LA
*Non-conference game. ^{#}Rankings from AP poll. (#) Tournament seedings in parentheses. All times are in Central.

== Conference awards and honors ==
=== Weekly awards ===
Weekly honors
Honors	Player	Position	Date Awarded	Ref.
SLC Women's Basketball Player of the Week	Nora Francois	C	December 2, 2024	
SLC Women's Basketball Player of the Week	Nora Francois	C	February 24, 2025	
SLC Women's Basketball Player of the Week	Nora Francois	C	March 6, 2025	

== See also ==
- 2024–25 New Orleans Privateers men's basketball team
