= LSU New Orleans Privateers =

Intercollegiate sports teams of University of New Orleans

- University: LSU New Orleans
- Nickname: Privateers
- NCAA: Division I
- Conference: Southland Conference
- Athletic director: Vince Granito
- Location: New Orleans, Louisiana
- Varsity teams: 14
- Basketball arena: Lakefront Arena
- Baseball stadium: Maestri Field at Privateer Park
- Volleyball arena: Human Performance Center
- Other venues: Bayou Oaks At City Park; English Turn Golf and Country Club; Human Performance Center; Lake Oaks Park; Privateer Beach; Tad Gormley Stadium; University Tennis Center
- Colors: Privateers Purple, Privateers Gold, and Privateers Silver Gray
- Mascot: Captain BrUNO (debuted Feb. 2017)
- Fight song: Let's hear it for UNO
- Website: privateersports.com

The LSU New Orleans Privateers are the intercollegiate athletic teams of LSU New Orleans (also known locally as LSUNO), located in the Lake Terrace/Lake Oaks neighborhood of New Orleans, Louisiana, United States. The Privateers compete in NCAA intercollegiate athletics as a member of the Southland Conference at the Division I level.

== History ==
LSUNO's athletic teams participated in NCAA Division II from 1969 to 1975 before moving to Division I and becoming a charter member of the Sun Belt Conference. In December 2009, the LSU Board approved a proposal from UNO to move its athletic program from Division I to Division III following a drop in enrollment and associated budget cuts following Hurricane Katrina. The school submitted an application in May 2010 and in June 2010, received initial approval from the NCAA Division III Membership Committee to move forward with its transition. The school originally announced that it intended to add football, along with women's golf and women's soccer as part of the transition to NCAA Division III.

LSUNO left the Sun Belt on June 30, 2010 and competed as an NCAA Division I Independent in all sports during the 2010–11 academic year as part of the transition from Division I. Following the findings of the financial analysis and institutional research, the LSU Board of Supervisors meetings approved the move down from Division I to Division II instead of Division III. LSUNO was placed on the NCAA Division II Membership Committee spring agenda, to compete in Division II sports. The Privateers added women's golf, men's cross country and women's cross country to reach Division II's minimum requirement of 10 sports. The Privateers began playing at the Division II level and competing as an independent team during the provisional 2011–12 academic year before becoming a full member of Division II and member of the Gulf South Conference in 2012–13.

On March 7, 2012, however, LSUNO President Dr. Peter Fos announced that the Privateers would remain in Division I. On August 21, 2012, LSU New Orleans announced that it would be joining the Southland Conference, effective the 2013–14 academic year.

== Conference affiliations ==
- 1969–70 to 1975–76 – NCAA Division II Independent
- 1976–77 to 1979–80 – Sun Belt Conference
- 1980–81 to 1986–87 – NCAA Division I Independent
- 1987–88 to 1990–91 – American South Conference
- 1991–92 to 2009–10 – Sun Belt Conference
- 2010–11 to 2012–13 – NCAA Division I Independent (Note: LSU New Orleans was transitioning from NCAA Division I to NCAA Division II and joined the Gulf South Conference (GSC) for some sports (excluding basketball) during the 2011–12 school year, only for the school to later announce its intentions to stay at NCAA Division I.)
- 2013–14 to present – Southland Conference

== Sports sponsored ==
Men's sports	Women's sports
Baseball	Basketball
Basketball	Beach volleyball
Cross country	Cross country
Golf	Tennis
Tennis	Track and field^{†}
Track and field^{†}	Volleyball
† – Track and field includes both indoor and outdoor.

=== Baseball ===
- Head coach – Andrew Gipson

The LSUNO baseball team plays its home games at Maestri Field at Privateer Park. LSU New Orleans's most notable baseball rivals are LSU and Tulane. Despite being a relative newcomer to college baseball, the LSUNO baseball team has a history of fielding competitive teams. Most of the early success belongs to Ron Maestri who led the team to the Division II World Series in 1974. After making the jump to Division I, Maestri once again brought success to the Privateers. In 1984, the Privateers became the first university in Louisiana to make the Division I College World Series. During the tenure of Tom Walter, the Privateers made post-season appearances in 2007 (as an automatic qualifier) & 2008 (as an at-large).

Augie Schmidt won the Golden Spikes Award with the Privateers in 1982.

==== Privateers in the majors ====
Privateers baseball has seen a number of alumni go on to Major League careers, including:

- Jim Bullinger
- Randy Bush
- Thomas Diamond
- Roger Erickson
- Johnny Giavotella
- Mark Higgins
- Eric Rasmussen
- Joe Slusarski
- Brian Traxler
- Jason Waddell
- Wally Whitehurst
- Ted Wood

=== Men's basketball ===
- Head coach – Stacy Hollowell

The Privateers play at 8,933-seat Lakefront Arena.

LSUNO qualified for four NCAA tournaments in 10 seasons between 1987 and 1996, and for a fifth in 2017. LSUNO won the Sun Belt Conference in 1978 and '96. Tim Floyd coached LSUNO to tournaments in 1991 and '93. The Privateers have been ranked nationally four times: 1987, '91, '93 and '96. The highest rank was 16th by the Associated Press in 1987. The schools best winning percentage (23-7/.767) came when it was an NCAA Division I Independent in 1983. In the 2017 NCAA tournament, LSUNO earned an automatic bid by winning the Southland Conference tournament. They played in the East Region of the First Four, losing to Mount St. Mary's 66–67.

NCAA Tournament history:

- Tournament appearances: 5
- Final Fours: 0
- NCAA Tournament record: 1–5

==== Privateers in the NBA ====
- Wilbur Holland
- Wayne Cooper
- Ledell Eackles
- Ronnie Grandison
- Tony Harris
- Ervin Johnson
- Michael McDonald
- Dedric Willoughby

=== Women's basketball ===
- Head coach – Trelanne Powell

The Privateers play at 8,933-seat Lakefront Arena.

On March 19, 1983, the Buck-ettes as they were known, won their third game in three days in Amarillo, Texas defeating Memphis 68–58 to win the Women's National Invitational Tournament. The team previously defeated Weber State (100–70) in the semifinals and Texas Tech (66–65) in the quarterfinals.

=== Women's beach volleyball ===
- Head coach – Millicent Van Norden

The LSU New Orleans Privateers women's beach volleyball team competes in the Southland Conference. The program was founded in 2015.

^{1}Women's golf was dropped and substituted with Women's sand volleyball beginning with the 2014–15 season.
^{2}Beach volleyball is a fully sanctioned NCAA sport which had its first national championship in the spring of 2016.

=== Men's golf ===
- Head coach – Jeff Lorio

=== Men's and women's tennis ===
- Head coach – Burzis Kanga

The LSU New Orleans men's tennis team is currently a member of the Southland Conference as an affiliate member. The team's home venue is the University Tennis Center.

All-Americans for the LSUNO tennis team include Kanga in the early 1980s and more recently, the doubles' team of Hossam Meligy and Ricardo Campos. Meligy and Campos received Intercollegiate Tennis Association All-American honors in 2012 at the NCAA Division II level as part of the school's intended transition.

=== Men's and women's track and field/cross country ===
- Head coach – Benjamin Dalton

The men's and women's indoor and outdoor track and field teams was reinstated in 2012–13, a year after the cross country program was reinstated in 2011–12. All six programs were cut in 2006 following the aftermath of Hurricane Katrina.

Both the men's and women's outdoor track and field teams hold their home meets at Tad Gormley Stadium. Lake Oaks Park is the home course for the men's and women's cross country teams.

In 2000, the UNO women's cross country team won the Sunbelt Conference championship, making it the only female team in school history to win a conference championship.

=== Volleyball ===
- Head coach – Kim Young-Buford

Women's Volleyball is coached by Kim Young-Buford, who came to LSUNO from Grambling in 2010. Her tenure at UNO began with a 23-match home regular season win streak. Nicky Valenti, one of the school's all-time dig leaders and a native of River Ridge, La. serves as Young-Buford's assistant. The Privateers play their home matches in the 1,760-seat Human Performance Center.

The volleyball program won the Sun Belt Conference West Division championship in 2009 under former head coach Jozsef Forman. The division championship was the first of its kind for the Privateer program. Former Privateer volleyball players include former NCAA Division I career kills leader Javonne Brooks. Brooks broke the collegiate women's volleyball record for career kills in a 3–0 win over UT-Pan American on October 29, 1992. The 5'10" senior from Wharton, Texas broke the old record 2,767 held by Long Beach State's Tara Cross. Brooks finished with 2,932 kills and in 2005 was named the Sun Belt's All-Time Greatest Volleyball Player.

== Former varsity sports ==
- Women's golf
- Women's gymnastics
- Men's and women's soccer
- Softball
- Men's and women's swimming and diving
  Former coaches of the LSUNO program include U.S. Olympian Ashley Tappin, current Florida International head coach Randy Horner, and James Winchester. The women's program originally competed from 1983–1992 with the men competing from 1988–1992. The women were reinstated in 2004 with the men following in 2008. The team has called the LSUNO Aquatic Center at Lakefront Arena as its home. The facility was damaged during Hurricane Katrina in Aug. 2005 with the team resuming competing in the pool ahead of the 2009 men's home opener against Stanford. In 2011 the university cut the swimming programs as part of the transition to Division II. Without a conference home the teams competed independent during the 2010–11 academic year with minimal members.

== Non-varsity sports ==
=== Football ===
1965–1970

The university fielded a club football team from 1965 to 1970 and it was the first team sport played at LSUNO. The team had a modest beginning, losing 21–0 to Loyola University-New Orleans in their only game in 1965. The Privateers played two games in 1966, finishing 1–1, beating Spring Hill College for their first victory ever but losing 20–6 to Loyola once again. The Privateers recorded their first winning season in 1967, finishing 2–1, but lost to Loyola for the third year in a row.

In 1968 head coach Tom Gruber directed the Privateers to a 3–1 record, defeating cross-town rival Loyola to win the South District championship of the National Club Football Association. That same year the Privateers finished the season ranked 8th in the NCFA national poll. George Baud, a Privateer defensive lineman was named a club football All-American as well.

In 1969 the Privateers, under new coach Dale Hoffpauir, again beat Loyola and finished 3–2–1, repeating as the South District champs and attaining a No. 4 preseason national ranking in the NCFA poll. The 1969 season was the first in which the Privateers played under the UNO banner rather than LSUNO, even though it would be five more years before the university officially became the University of New Orleans. Also in 1969, the Privateers moved their home field to East Jefferson Stadium from Tad Gormley Stadium where they had played their first four seasons.

The 1970 Privateers played a seven-game schedule, finishing 3–4 but winning the South District for the third consecutive season because of their 2–0 district record which included a victory over Loyola. 1970 again saw a change in venue for the Privateers as they alternated home games between East Jefferson Stadium and West Jefferson Stadium.

In its first six seasons of football, LSUNO's overall record was 12–10–1 with three district championships. The series record with arch-rival Loyola stands at 3–3. LSUNO owns a 2–0 advantage over Nicholls State after beating the Colonels in 1969 and 1970. The Privateers did play the Tulane JV squad in 1970 at Tulane, with the Green Wave beating LSU New Orleans 56–13. LSUNO's Founding Chancellor Homer Hitt recalled the six years of Privateer football as a "kind of glory period for LSUNO. We competed with schools from all over, including Loyola and Nicholls."

1971–2007

In 1971, when club football programs faded and the NCFA folded, LSUNO dropped the program while Nicholls State, a club football rival of the Privateers, elevated their team to full intercollegiate status. LSUNO had considered expanding its football program to a fully funded level, but it was thought to be too costly at the time. The club football team had spent $22,000 in 1970. Doc Costanza stated in his 1989 Driftwood article on LSUNO football: "When one considers the costs and benefits of a modern college football team, it seems that it may have been a mistake for LSUNO to phase out its team rather than expand it."

Between 1971 and 2007 there were several unsuccessful attempts to establish NCAA football at LSUNO. In 1984, UNO Football, Inc. was organized by Professor Stephen Ambrose to secure the funding for a full-fledged Division I football program at LSU New Orleans. Dr. Ambrose was ambitious. He was quoted by the Baton Rouge Morning Advocate in April, 1984 as offering this scenario: "September 1990: LSU 58, UNO 0. September 1991: LSU 28, UNO 7. And then in the third year...watch out!" LSUNO athletic director Ron Maestri was also supportive of the plan to bring football to LSUNO at the time. He was quoted in the same Morning Advocate article as saying, "Our students are hooked on football. They attend LSU and Tulane games. Students, faculty and staff can rally around a football program. It's a dimension most other major universities have." But because the 1980s were times of financial crisis in Louisiana and because academic and athletic budgets were being slashed around the state, the fundraising drive for LSUNO football stalled and the idea was dropped.

In April, 2000 a proposal for non-scholarship football at LSUNO was released to the public. This proposal was authored by Roy Raspanti, former executive director of the UNO Athletic Association. In May, 2000 the UNO Athletic Association was reorganized as the Privateer Athletic Foundation. During then-AD Bob Brown's tenure, a PAF committee was formed to study the feasibility of football at LSUNO. The committee researched the issues extensively, but no action was ever taken to move forward with implementing the football program. LSUNO went 38 years without football until the club program was revived for the 2008 season.

2008–2011

Football was reinstated in 2008 with the university's admissions director, Andy Benoit, as head coach. Operating on a limited budget and with only eight players, the Privateers set out to raise the funds and build a team in order to play. In their first season on the gridiron, the Privateers played two games and drew 3,700 fans to its first game at Tad Gormley Stadium; which was the team's home stadium from 2008–2011. During the 2008 season, LSUNO club football outdrew NCAA Division I, II and III programs for some of their home games. The 2009 season saw LSUNO finish with a 5–3 record.

In 2010, the team finished with a record of 7–2 and won the 2010 NCFA National Championship.

In 2011, the team played under the direction of Sean Santos and later Austin Thomas.

2012

The 2012 season played at Pan American Stadium was suspended due to fielding players who were not enrolled at LSUNO; claims that the season was cancelled due to budget cuts were incorrect as club football was privately funded.

Future endeavors

LSUNO has not fielded a team since the 2012 season and the LSU New Orleans athletic department is studying the feasibility of fielding a football team on the Football Championship Subdivision (FCS) level.

== Athletic facilities ==
=== Current ===
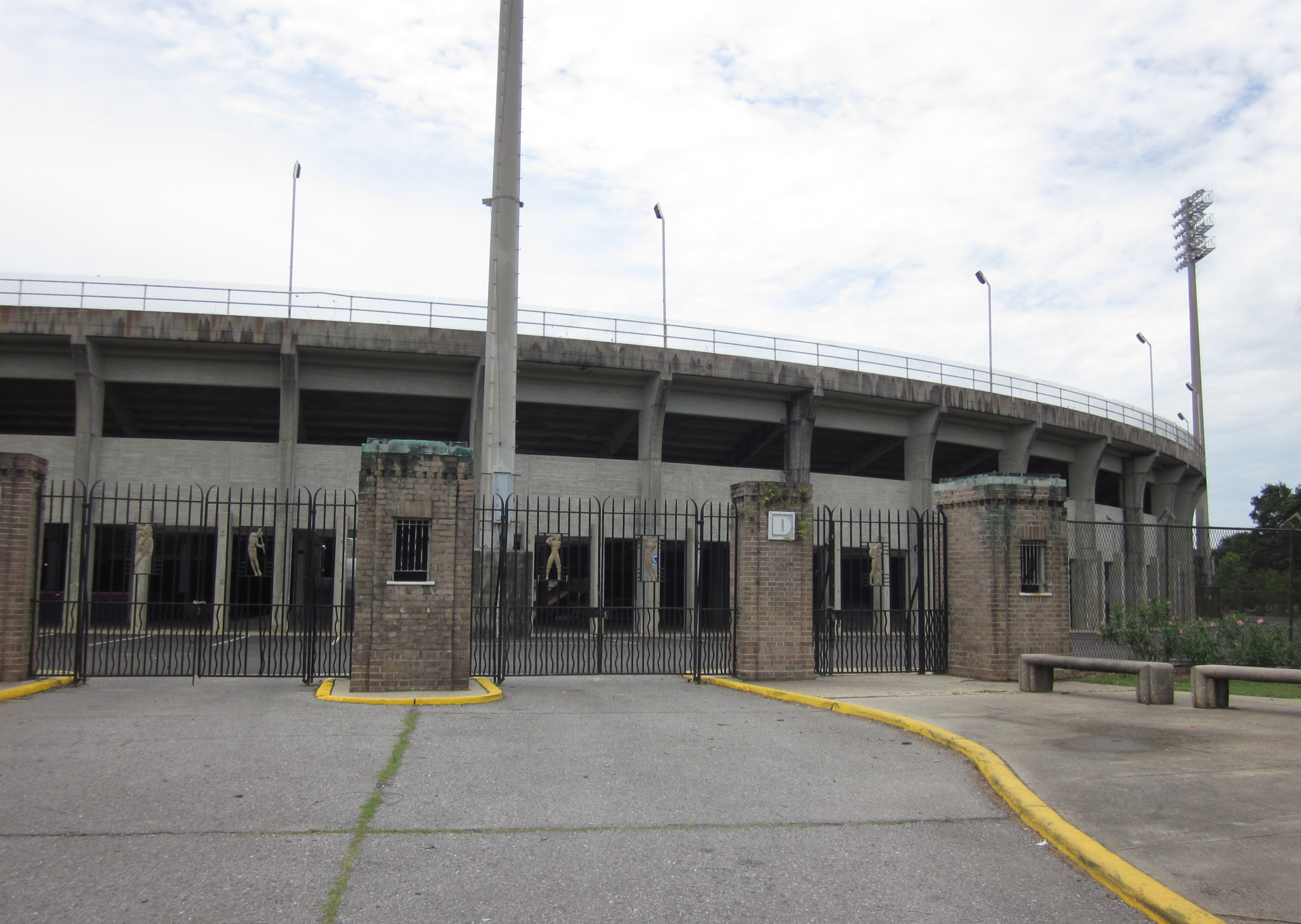
Gormley Stadium

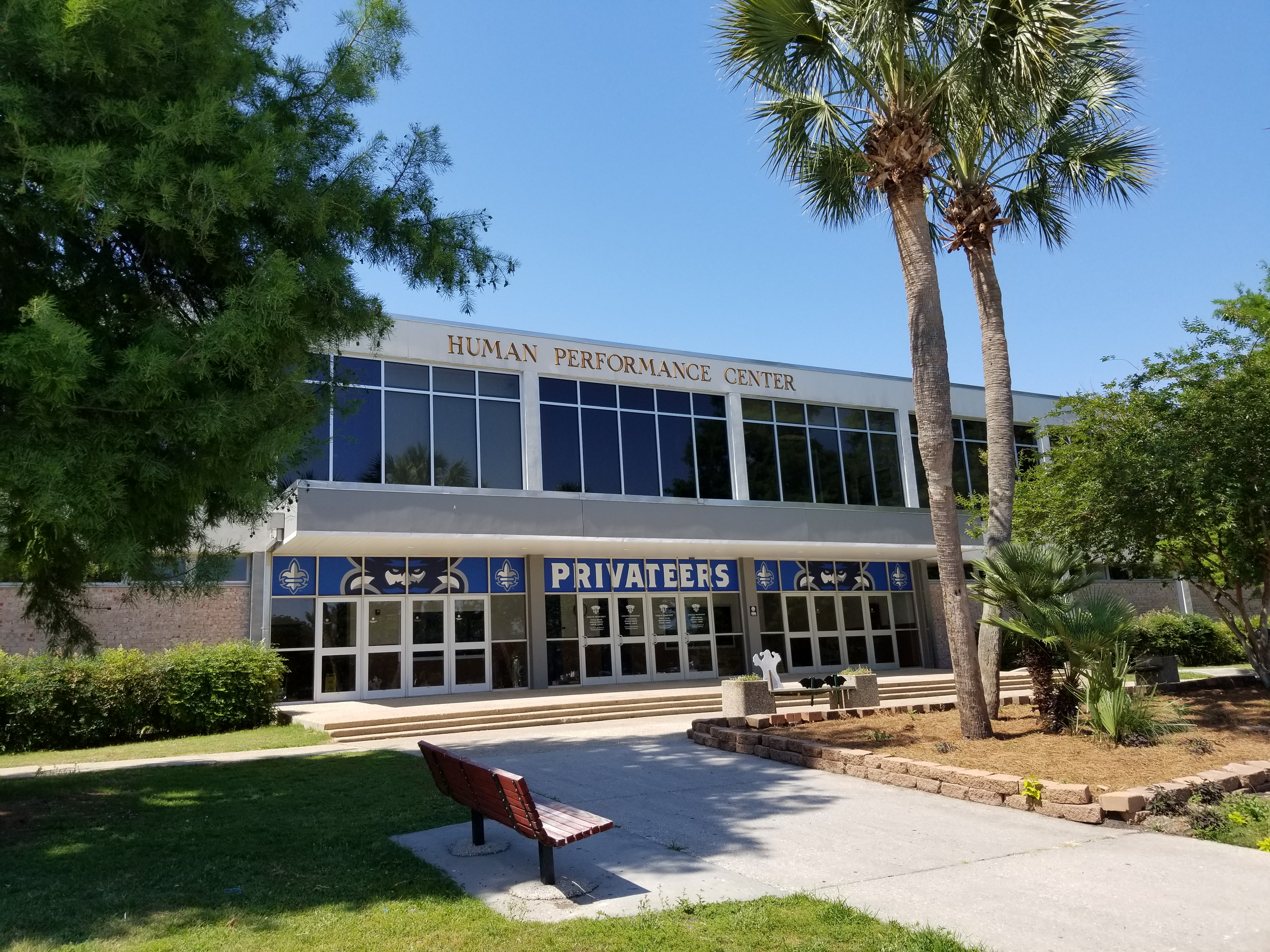
Human Performance Center

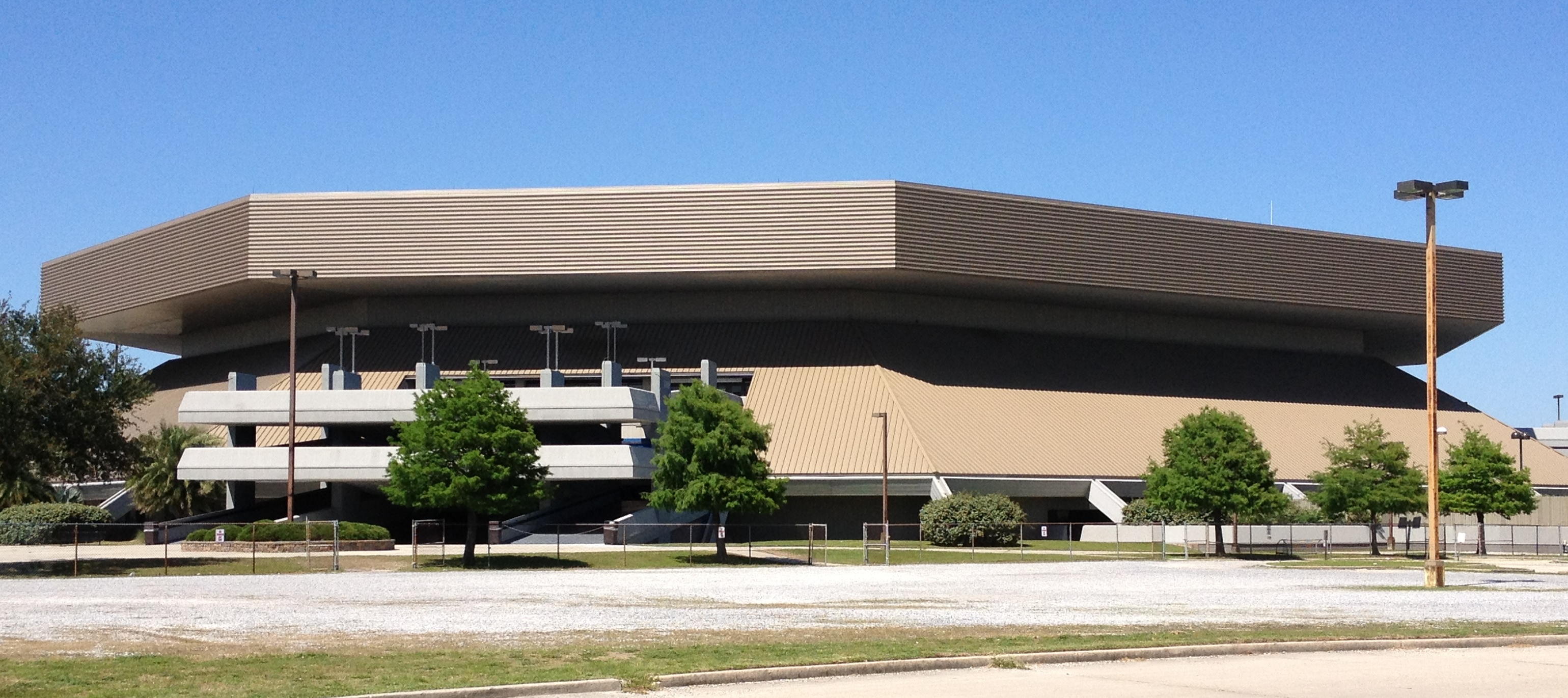
Lakefront Arena

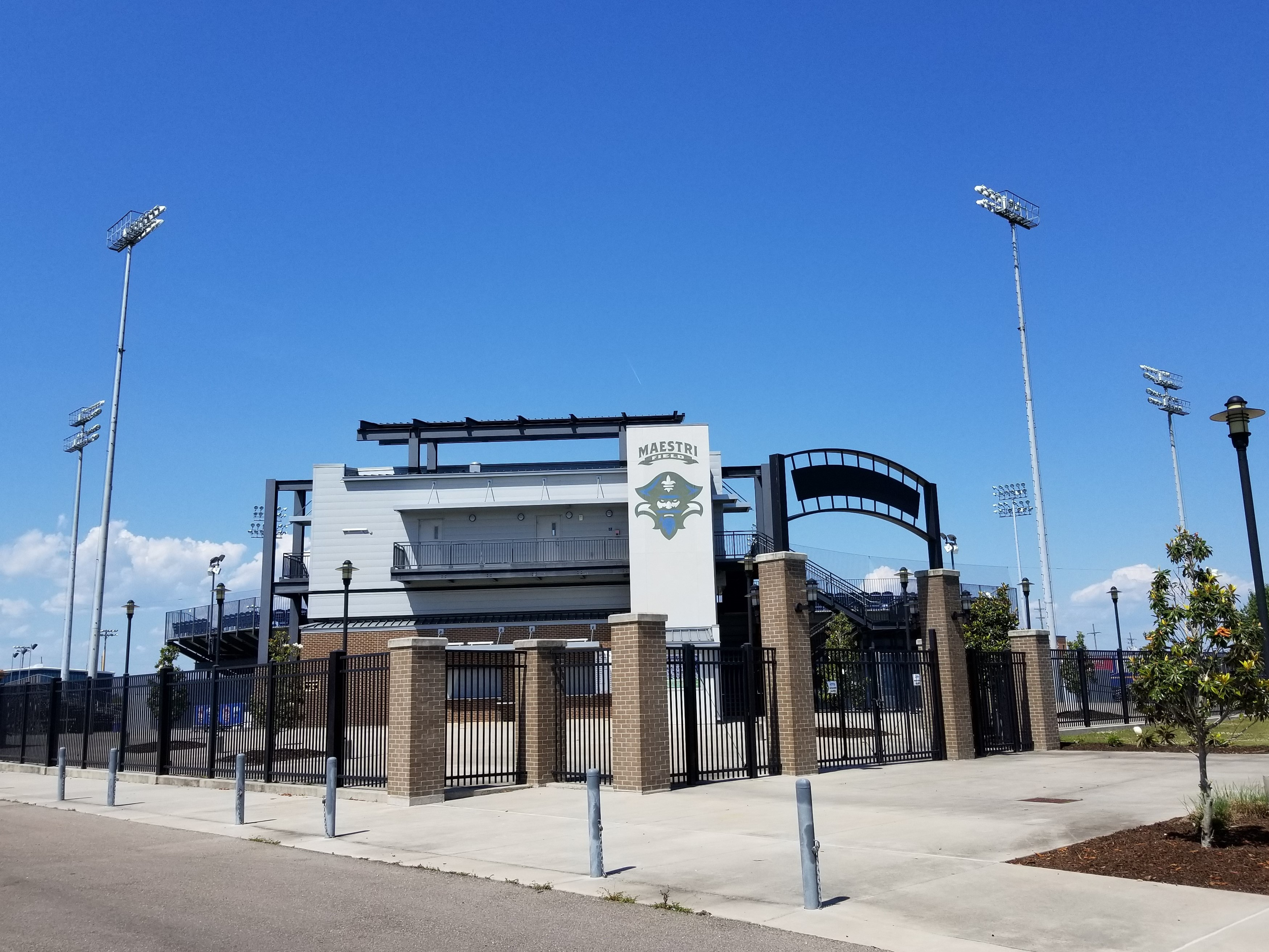
Maestri Field

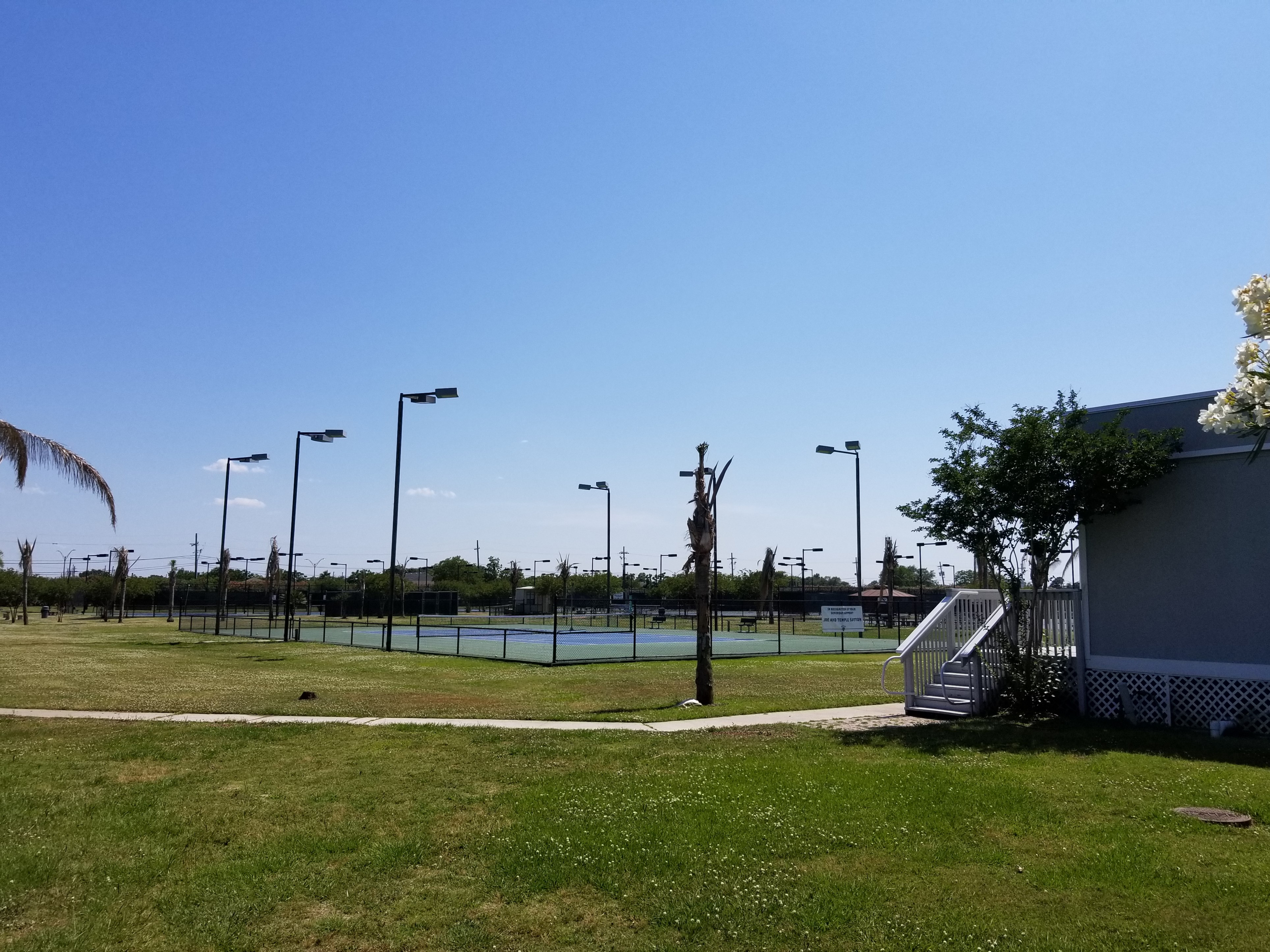
Tennis Center

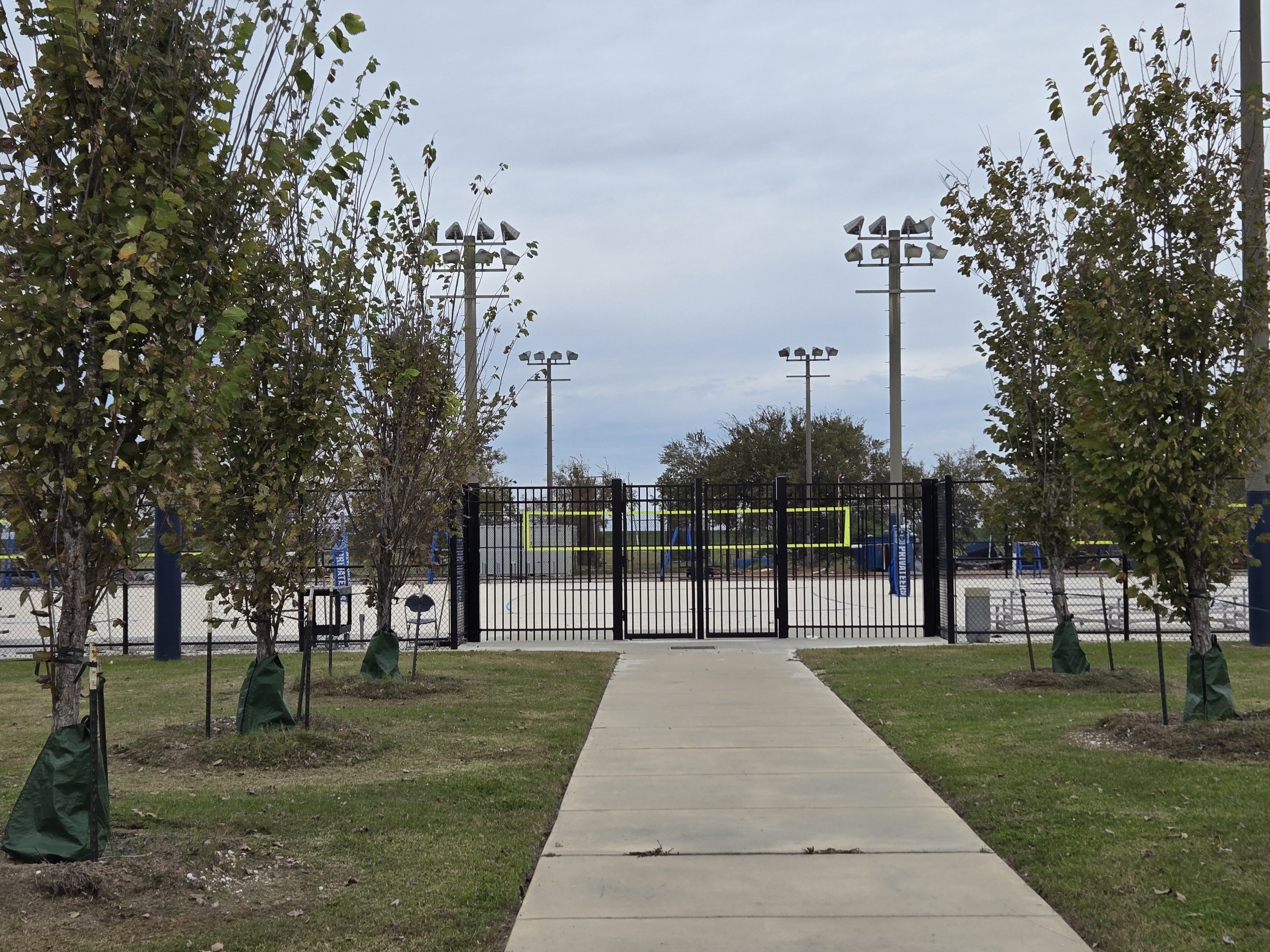
Privateer Beach

Venue	Sport
Bayou Oaks at City Park (Note: Not owned by the university but by City Park Conservancy.)	Golf
English Turn Golf (Note: Not owned by the university but a private club.)	Golf
Human Performance Center	Volleyball
Lake Oaks Park	Cross country
Lakefront Arena	Basketball
Maestri Field	Baseball
Privateer Beach	Beach volleyball
Tad Gormley Stadium	Track and field
University Tennis Center	Tennis

=== Former ===
- UNO Beach Courts — Beach volleyball

== Traditions ==
=== Fight song ===
The official fight song of The University of New Orleans is "Let's hear it for UNO." The song was adopted after a competition in 1981. The winner was Lois Ostrolenk. Before this, the melody from William Tell Overture was used. A variation of the overture is still played to honor this tradition.

=== Mascot ===
At one time the mascot was Lafitte the Instigator, an anthropomorphized alligator dressed as a pirate, as seen in a 2013 video posted on the Southland Conference's YouTube channel.

A new mascot, Capt. Bruno, debuted as part of a "Let the Good Times Roll" parade through campus on February 23, 2017.

== See also ==
- List of NCAA Division I institutions
