= New Orleans Privateers basketball =

New Orleans Privateers basketball may refer to either of the basketball teams that represent the University of New Orleans:

- New Orleans Privateers men's basketball
- New Orleans Privateers women's basketball
