= Human Performance Center =

Arena in New Orleans, Louisiana

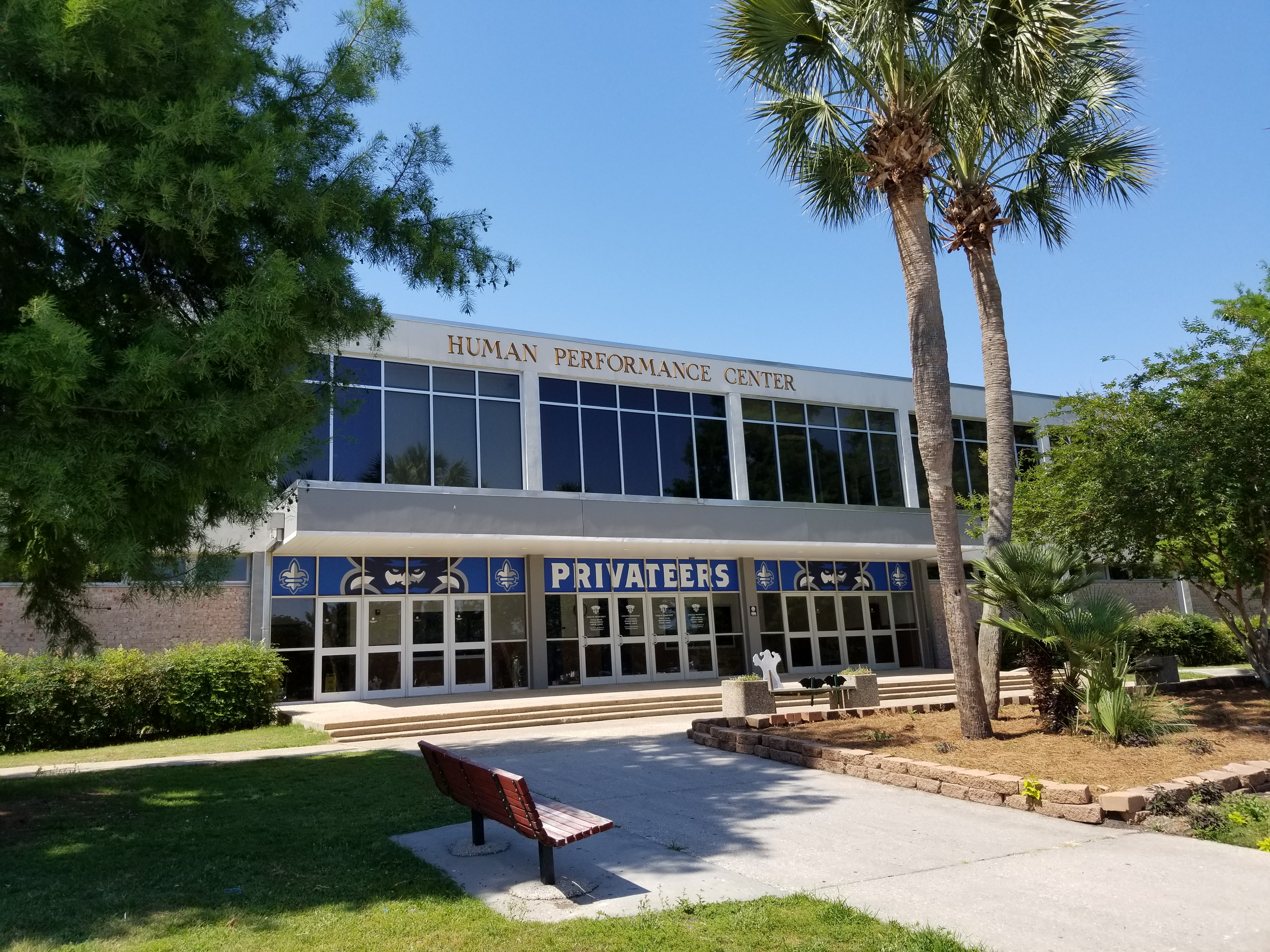
- Interactive map of Human Performance Center
- Full name: Human Performance Center
- Former names: Health & Physical Education Center
- Location: New Orleans, Louisiana
- Coordinates: 30.0275°N 90.0671°W
- Owner: LSU New Orleans
- Operator: LSU New Orleans
- Capacity: 1,760
- Surface: Multi-surface

Construction
- Opened: 1969

Tenants
- LSU New Orleans Privateers men's basketball (1969–1983; 2006–2008); LSU New Orleans Privateers women's basketball (1975–1983; 2006–2008); LSU New Orleans Privateers volleyball (1975–2009; 2011–present)

Website
- Human Performance Center

The Human Performance Center is a 1,760-seat multi-purpose arena on the campus of the LSU New Orleans in New Orleans, Louisiana. It is the home venue for the LSU New Orleans Privateers volleyball team. The arena became the permanent home of the volleyball team in 2012 following years of alternating between the Performance Center and Lakefront Arena.

Since 2008, the Human Performance Center has been the home venue of the Big Easy Rollergirls, New Orleans' WFTDA flat track roller derby league.

== History ==
The venue, known to fans as the "Chamber of Horrors", was home to the LSU New Orleans Privateers men's basketball team from its inception in 1969–70 until the opening of Lakefront Arena in 1983. During that period, the venue was officially known as the Health & Physical Education Center. The arena was used as the temporary home of the LSUNO men's and women's basketball teams from the 2005–2006 season until 2008 while Lakefront Arena was being repaired following Hurricane Katrina.

The facility hosted LHSAA state wrestling tournaments in 1975 and 1995.
