= Trelanne Powell =

American college basketball player and coach

Current position
- Title: Head coach
- Team: LSU New Orleans
- Conference: Southland
- Record: 19–70 (.213)

Playing career
- 2000–2002: Hiwassee
- 2002–2004: Columbus State

Coaching career (HC unless noted)
- 2009–2011: Chattahoochee Valley (assistant)
- 2011–2014: Chattahoochee Valley
- 2014–2015: Francis Marion (assistant HC)
- 2015–2018: Mercer (assistant)
- 2018–2023: Tuskegee
- 2023–present: New Orleans / LSU New Orleans

Administrative career (AD unless noted)
- 2020–2023: Tuskegee (senior women's administrator)

Head coaching record
- Overall: 19–70 (.213) (NCAA D-I); 97–32 (.752) (NCAA D-II)

Trelanne Powell is an American basketball coach and former player who is the current head coach of the New Orleans Privateers women's basketball team.

== Coaching career ==
On April 11, 2023, Powell was announced as the sixth head coach University of New Orleans women's basketball program history.

== Head coaching record ==
=== NCAA head coaching record ===
Record table
Season	Team	Overall	Conference	Standing	Postseason
Tuskegee Golden Tigers (SIAC) (2018–2023)
2018–19	Tuskegee	20–7	13–3	1st (West)	
2019–20	Tuskegee	17–14	10–8	T-2nd (West)	
2020–21	Tuskegee	12–2	Conference season cancelled due to the COVID-19 pandemic.		NCAA First Round
2021–22	Tuskegee	22–5	15–3	1st (West)	
2022–23	Tuskegee	26–4	20–0	1st (West)	NCAA First Round
Tuskegee:		97–32 (.752)	58–14 (.806)		
New Orleans Privateers (Southland) (2023–present)
2023–24	New Orleans	11–19	8–10	T-5th	
2024–25	New Orleans	5–24	5–15	T-9th	
2025–26	New Orleans	3–27	3–19	12th	
New Orleans:		19–70 (.213)	16–44 (.267)		
Total:		116–102 (.532)			
National champion Postseason invitational champion Conference regular season champion Conference regular season and conference tournament champion Division regular season champion Division regular season and conference tournament champion Conference tournament champion
