= LSU New Orleans Privateers women's basketball =

College women's basketball team for LSU New Orleans

LSU New Orleans Privateers
2025–26 New Orleans Privateers women's basketball team
- University: LSU New Orleans
- Head coach: Trelanne Powell (3rd season)
- Location: New Orleans, Louisiana
- Arena: Lakefront Arena (capacity: 10,000)
- Conference: Southland
- Nickname: Privateers
- Colors: Privateers Purple, Privateers Gold, and Privateers Silver Gray

NCAA Division I tournament appearances
- 1987

Uniforms
Home	Away

For information on all LSU New Orleans sports, see LSU New Orleans Privateers

The LSU New Orleans Privateers women's basketball team is the women's basketball team that represents LSU New Orleans in New Orleans, Louisiana. The team currently competes in the Southland Conference. The Privateers are currently coached by Trelanne Powell.

Under coach Joey Favaloro, the Privateers won 25 games in 1986–87 and reached the NCAA Tournament, their only appearance so far. They won 25 games the following year but have won only 20 games in a season one time since.

== Postseason appearances ==
The Privateers have made one NCAA Tournament appearance. They have a record of 0–1.

Year	Round	Opponent	Result
1987	Second Round	Iowa	L 56–68

== Retired numbers ==
- No. 44 Sandra Hodge (1989)
