= Lakefront Arena =

Multi-purpose arena in New Orleans, Louisiana

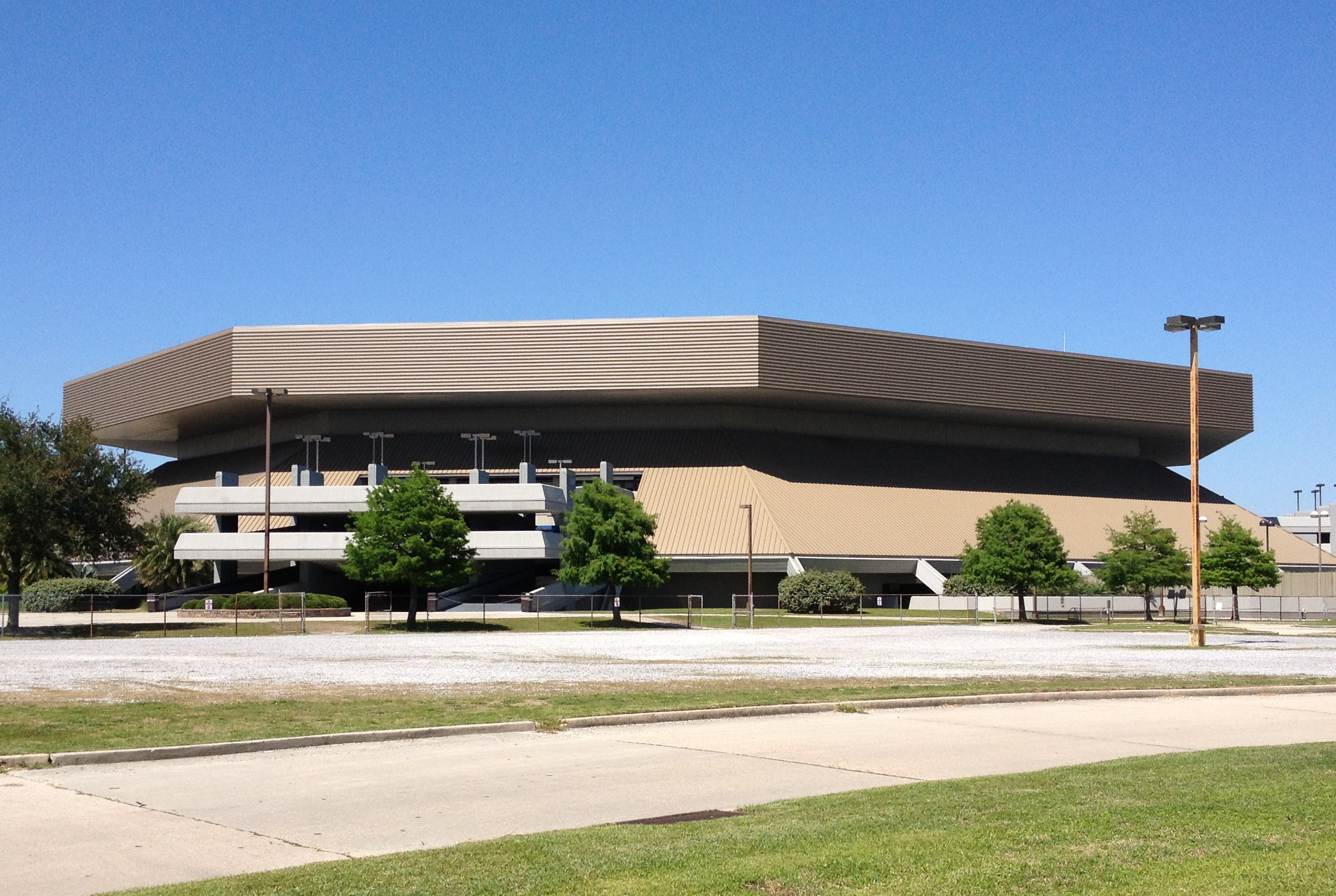
- LSUNO Lakefront Arena
- Interactive map of Lakefront Arena
- Full name: Senator Nat G. Kiefer LSU New Orleans Lakefront Arena
- Former names: University of New Orleans Lakefront Arena (1983–1987); Senator Nat G. Kiefer University of New Orleans Lakefront Arena (1987–2026)
- Address: 6801 Franklin Avenue
- Location: New Orleans, Louisiana, U.S.
- Coordinates: 30°1′48″N 90°3′2″W
- Owner: LSU New Orleans
- Operator: LSU New Orleans
- Capacity: 8,933
- Surface: Multi-surface

Construction
- Opened: 1983

Tenants
- LSU New Orleans Privateers men's basketball (1983–2005, 2008–present); LSU New Orleans Privateers women's basketball (1983–2005, 2008–present); LSU New Orleans Privateers volleyball (2008–2011)

Website
- arena.uno.edu

The Senator Nat G. Kiefer LSU New Orleans Lakefront Arena (commonly Lakefront Arena or LSUNO Lakefront Arena) is an 8,933-seat multi-purpose arena located in New Orleans, Louisiana. The arena is home to the LSU New Orleans Privateers men's and women's basketball teams.

The arena first opened November 1, 1983, with Lionel Richie performing for two consecutive nights. In 1986 it was renamed in honor of Nat G. Kiefer, the late state senator who aided LSUNO's efforts to obtain state funding for the building. Kiefer's state senate district included the LSU New Orleans campus. It is part of the university's East Campus; the arena is southwest of Maestri Field, home to the LSUNO baseball team.

== Sports ==
=== Basketball ===
Lakefront Arena is the home venue for both the LSU New Orleans Privateers men's and women's basketball teams. Demand for a new basketball arena on the LSUNO campus was seen as an acute need. The school was a founding member of the Sun Belt Conference but was expelled from the league in 1980 on account of its old gym, the Human Performance Center, being deemed unsuitable for league play. On November 26, 1983, LSU New Orleans first played in the arena, hosting in-state rival LSU in a basketball doubleheader.

The arena hosted the 1991 NCAA Women's basketball Final Four, where the University of Tennessee beat the University of Virginia for their third national title. The arena was contracted to host the men's and women's Sun Belt Conference basketball tournaments between 2014 and 2019. The arena previously hosted the 2002 men's Sun Belt Conference basketball tournament.

The arena is also notable for hosting Larry Bird's career-high of 60 points on March 12, 1985, against the Atlanta Hawks, who were hosting a series of special "home" games in New Orleans during the 1984–1985 season.

The Harlem Globetrotters have also played at the arena.

=== Boxing ===
On July 14, 2018, a full card was held at the arena with a co-main event of Regis Prograis versus Juan Jose Velasco for the WBC Super Lightweight Diamond Belt and William Silva versus Teófimo López for the WBC Continental Americas title.

=== MMA ===
UFC 27 was held at the arena in September 2000.

=== Roller derby ===
Lakefront Arena plays host to flat-track roller derby games held by the Big Easy Rollergirls, a member league of the Women's Flat Track Derby Association, and the New Orleans Brass Roller Derby, a member league of the Men's Roller Derby Association. These games include the Big Easy Rollergirls' annual "SweatFest" invitational tournament, which features competition among high-ranking WFTDA leagues.

=== Swimming and diving ===
The LSUNO Aquatic Center is located in the arena and on the arena grounds. It has been home to the UNO men's and women's swimming and diving teams. The aquatic center has also hosted many national and state events including Sugar Bowl Swimming meets, AAU National Championships and Junior Olympics, LHSAA State meets, Syncro National competition, and hosted the 2010 Short Course and Long Course state meets.

=== Volleyball ===
From 2008 to 2011, the arena, along with the Human Performance Center, were the home venues for the LSU New Orleans Privateers volleyball team.

=== Wrestling ===
The arena hosted LHSAA state wrestling tournaments in 1996 and 1998.

=== Professional wrestling ===
On October 23, 1993, World Championship Wrestling held its Halloween Havoc pay-per-view at Lakefront Arena.

Ring of Honor wrestling's Supercard of Honor XII was hosted at Lakefront Arena on April 7, 2018, during WrestleMania 34 weekend. The arena also hosted several house shows during the 1980s.

All Elite Wrestling hosted its flagship TV show, Dynamite, at the arena on 13 April 2022 which included hometown star Ricky Starks, and Samoa Joe winning his first ROH World Television Championship from Minoru Suzuki.

== Events ==
The arena also hosts graduations and concerts, such as 3 Doors Down, 311, AC/DC, Aerosmith, Anthrax, Alanis Morissette, Blink-182, Bon Jovi, Brandy, Britney Spears, Carrie Underwood, Christina Aguilera, The Cure, Daughtry, Def Leppard, Demi Lovato, Eric Church, Exodus, for KING & COUNTRY, Great White, Guns N' Roses, Helloween, Kid Rock, Kix, Korn, Lady Gaga, Limp Bizkit, Mötley Crüe, Nas, Ne-Yo, Poison, Prince, Rammstein, Ratt, Pearl Jam, Nirvana, MC Hammer, Red Hot Chili Peppers, R.E.M., Rod Stewart, Rush, Scorpions, Skid Row, Slipknot, Tesla, The Black Keys, The Grateful Dead, Widespread Panic, Tom Petty, Trixter, Van Halen, Warrant, White Lion, Whitesnake, Xandria and Zac Brown Band. Sting performed during his Symphonicities Tour on June 26, 2010, along with the Royal Philharmonic Orchestra. During their Walking Into Everywhere tour, Jimmy Page and Robert Plant performed on October 1, 1998, and the show was recorded for later broadcast by Westwood One.

During a Depeche Mode concert at the arena on October 8, 1993, lead singer Dave Gahan suffered a heart attack brought on by drug use, and was escorted out in an ambulance.

Events held at the arena have included Disney on Ice, Sesame Street Live, Shrine Circus, So You Think You Can Dance: The Tour, WWE and Fox's singer search program The X Factor.

Comedians such as Bill Cosby, Robin Williams, Katt Williams, and Dave Chappelle have performed at the venue.

Pope John Paul II celebrated mass to over 150,000 people on the grounds of the arena and prominent political figures such as Bill Clinton and John Kerry have also spoken at the arena.

Large festivals, including Lollapalooza and Steel Pony Express have also been held on the grounds.

== Hurricane Katrina ==
In August 2005, as a result of massive damages sustained during Hurricane Katrina, the building closed for substantial repairs and renovations for nearly three years. During this time, the school's men's and women's basketball teams played their home games in their former home, the Human Performance Center (or "The Chamber of Horrors" as it grew to be known during the late '70s and early '80s).

The arena held its grand re-opening May 2, 2008. Disney's High School Musical: The Ice Tour was the first show to perform.

== Gallery ==
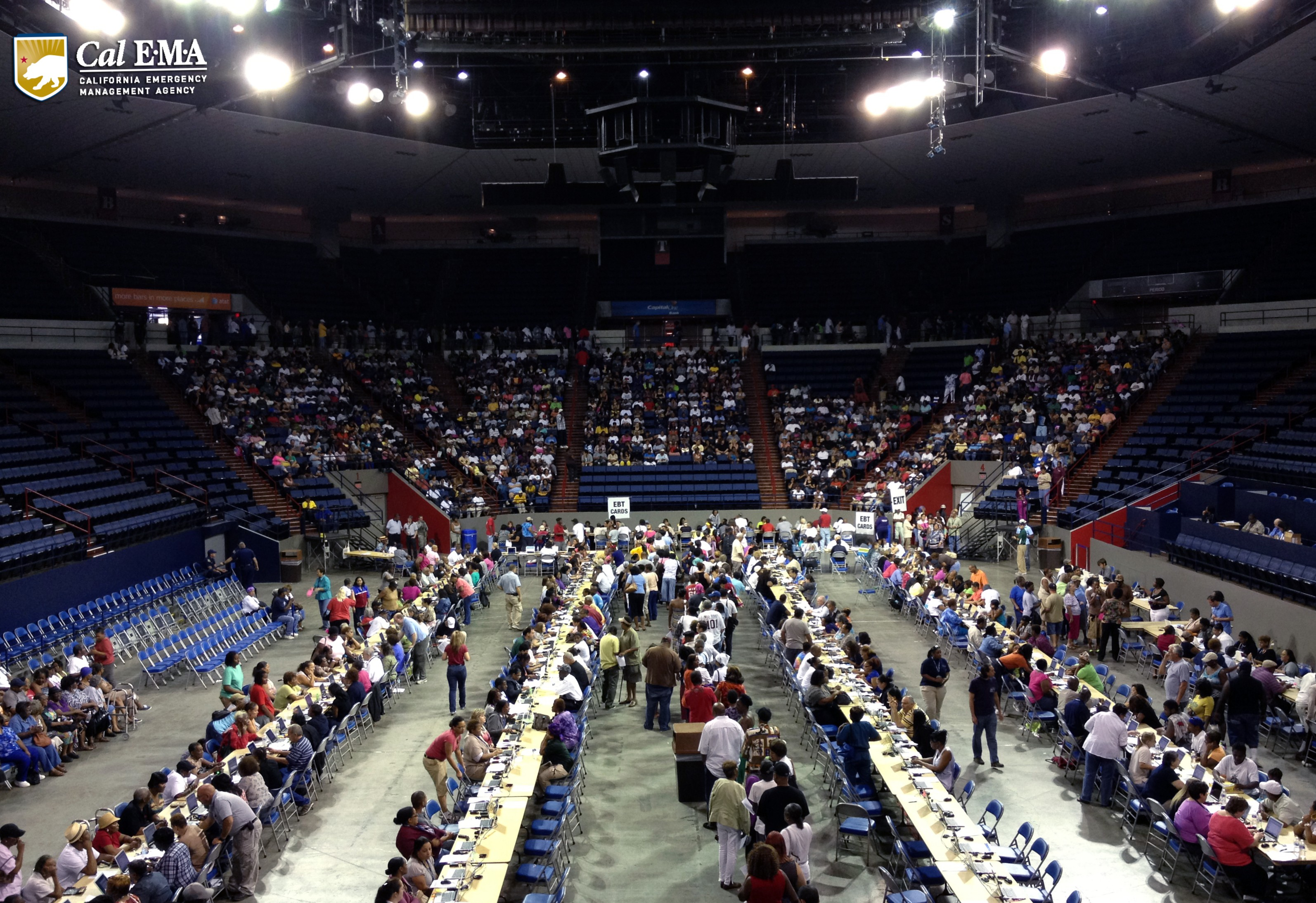
LSUNO Lakefront Arena, Interior

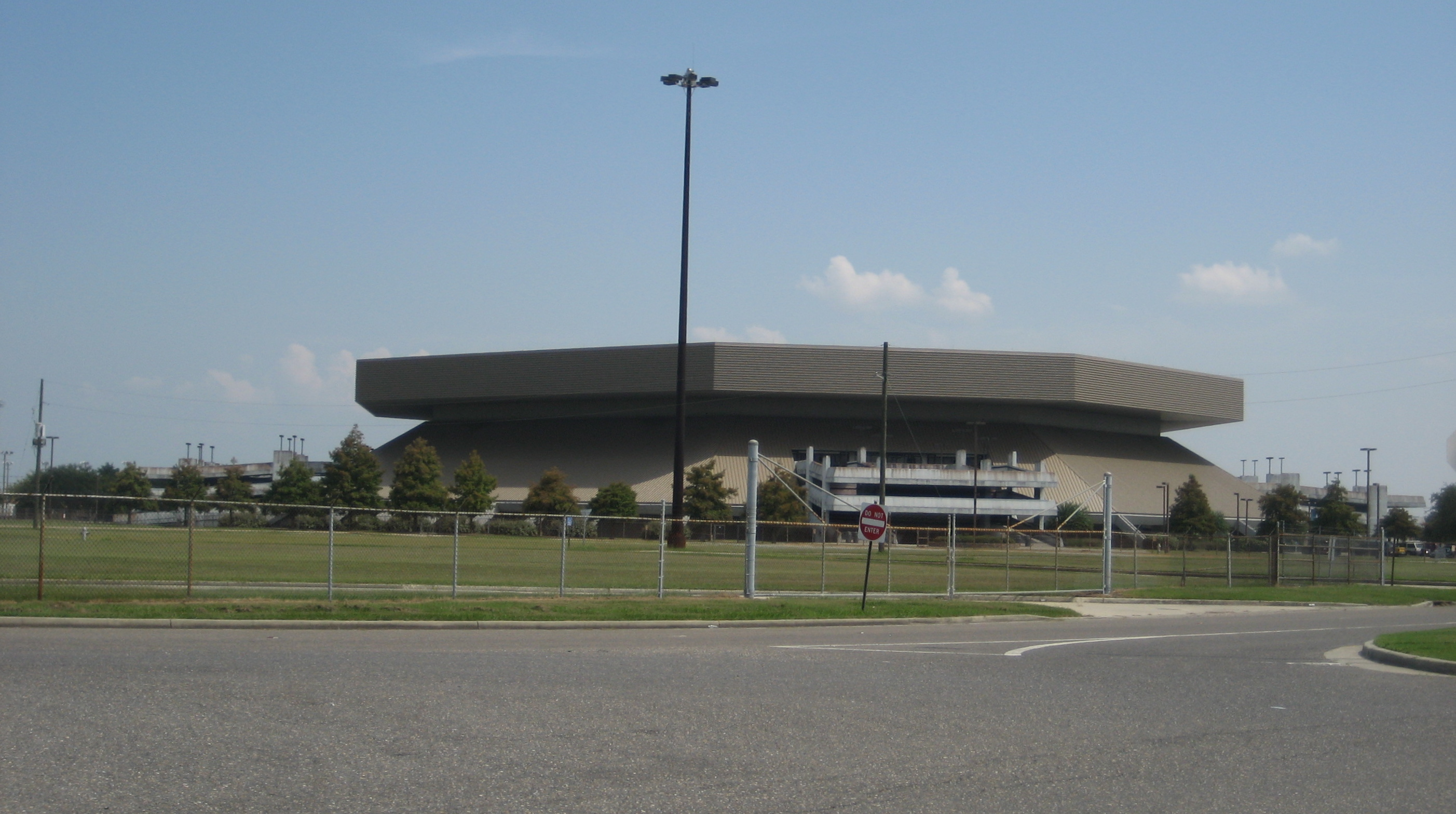
LSUNO Lakefront Arena, August 2009

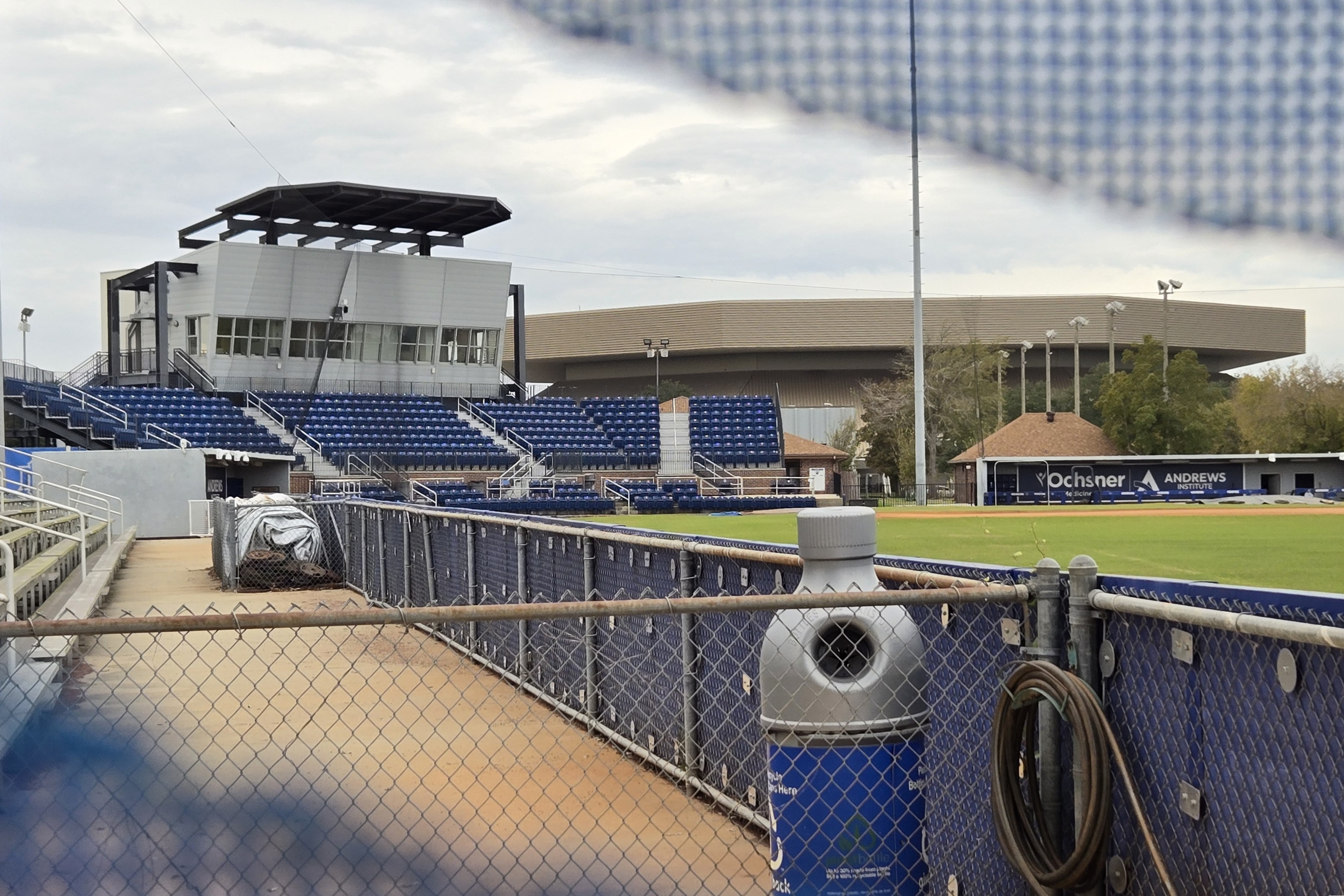
LSUNO Lakefront Arena with Maestri Field at Privateer Park in foreground

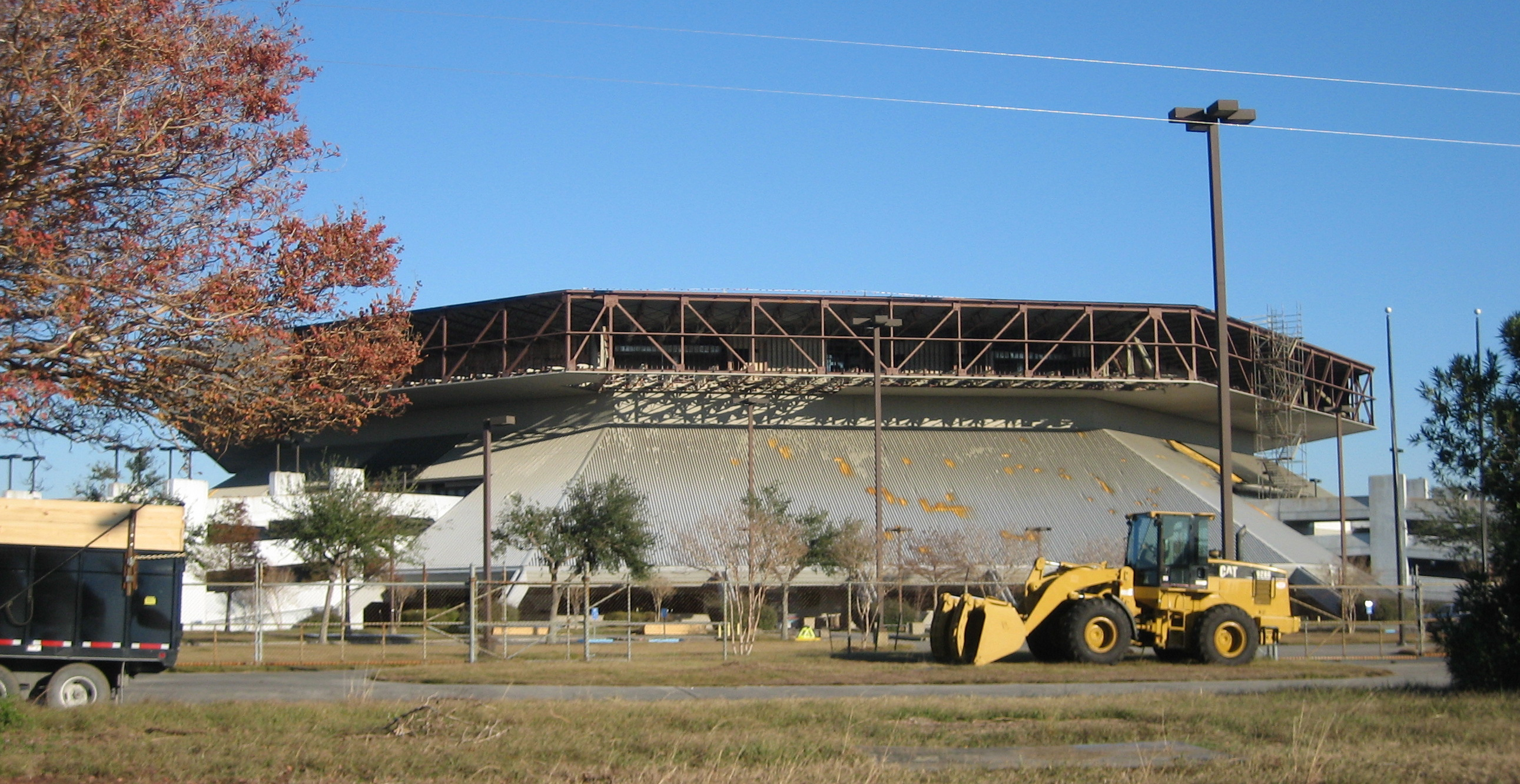
LSUNO Lakefront Arena, Post Hurricane Katrina

== See also ==
- List of NCAA Division I basketball arenas
- List of music venues

Events and tenants
Preceded by Five Seasons Events Center	Ultimate Fighting Championship venue UFC 27	Succeeded by Trump Taj Mahal
