= Maestri Field at Privateer Park =

Baseball stadium in New Orleans, Louisiana

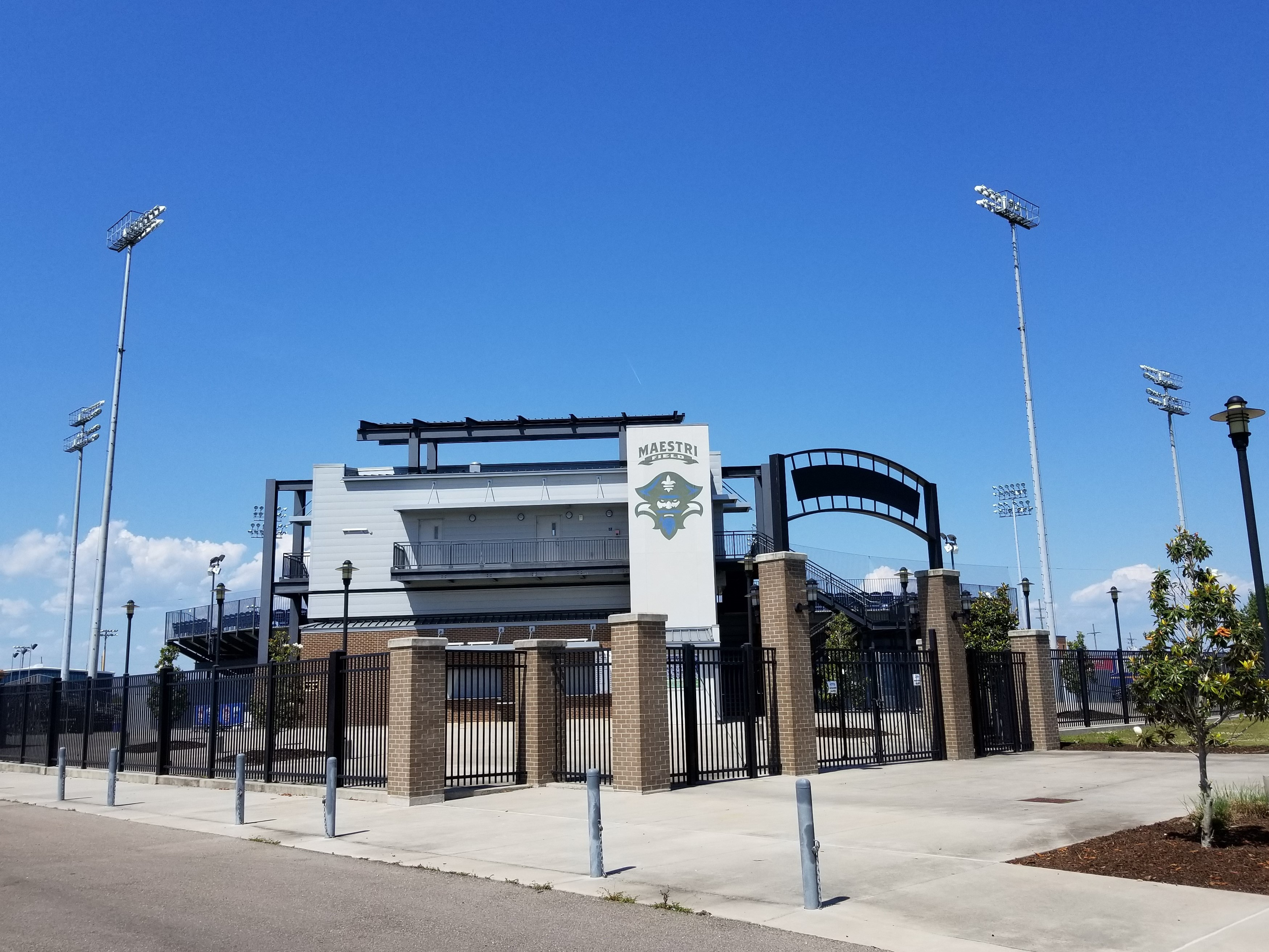
- Interactive map of Maestri Field at Privateer Park
- Location: 6801 Franklin Ave., New Orleans, Louisiana, United States
- Coordinates: 30°1′48.9″N 90°02′50.4″W
- Seating type: 800 chairback seats 2,100 bleacher seats
- Capacity: 2,900
- Surface: Natural grass
- Record attendance: 5,431; April 9, 1979 vs Tulane
- Field size: Left/Right Field - 330 ft Power Alleys - 370 ft Center Field - 405 ft
- Field shape: Symmetrical

Construction
- Opened: 1979
- Renovated: 2006, 2013

Tenants
- LSU New Orleans Privateers baseball (NCAA) (1979–Present); New Orleans Zephyrs (AA) (1993–96)

Maestri Field at Privateer Park is a baseball stadium in New Orleans, Louisiana more commonly known as Maestri Field. It is the home field of the LSU New Orleans (LSUNO) Privateers baseball team.

The facility is located on LSUNO's east campus, about one mile (1.6 km) from the main campus and near the intersection of Press Drive and Leon C. Simon Blvd. Along with the baseball diamond, the east campus is the site of Kiefer LSUNO Lakefront Arena and the University Tennis Center.

== History ==
The ballpark opened in 1979 and is named after Ron Maestri, who coached the team from 1972 to 1984 and from 2014 to 2015, and athletic director, where he served for 21 years ending his term in 2000. The stadium was also the home of the New Orleans Zephyrs minor-league baseball team (1993–1996) prior to Zephyr Field opening in 1997. In 1996, the stadium hosted the AAU Junior Olympics baseball competition. Maestri returned to coach the Privateers beginning with the 2014 season.

== Stadium features ==
The facility has all-aluminum seating and a brick and wrought-iron facade which dramatically changed the park's appearance. Maestri Field had a complete surface facelift prior to the 2006 season. The facelift included a complete reworking of the entire playing surface. Included in the renovation were new irrigation and drainage systems. Also, the entire sand-based Bermuda grass surface was skinned, laser graded and resodded. Improvements also included a 10’ halo around the home plate area and a surrounding warning track enclosing the entire grass surface.

The park has a newly remodeled press box and a new lower fence and batter's eye. Included in the remodeled press box are media facilities that feature a game management area, two radio booths and a section for media and booster seating. The symmetrical field measures 330 feet (100 m) down the lines, 370 feet (110 m) in the power alleys and 405 feet (123 m) to center field.

=== Stadium improvements ===
Prior to the 2005 season, LSUNO Chancellor Tim Ryan along with athletic director Jim Miller revealed a state-of-the-art clubhouse. The clubhouse, located behind the 3rd base stands includes a 60’ wide screen television in the lounge and individual wooden lockers in the rear locker area.

On May 10, 2013, LSUNO broke ground on renovations to Maestri Field. The renovations include a new grandstand with 800 chairback seats. In addition, the renovation project will also feature a new press box and a private suite. The project is estimated at $3 million and will be complete by the 2014 baseball season home opener against LSU on February 15.

== Awards and highlights ==
Meanwhile, the playing surface remains one of the best in America. In January 1991, the field and the UNO baseball staff were honored by the American Baseball Coaches Association with the Groundskeeper of the Year Award for the nation's best field. The field passed one of its biggest tests in 1993 when the New Orleans Zephyrs - then the Class AAA affiliate of the Milwaukee Brewers - played 64 home dates in their debut season successfully.

LSU New Orleans has finished among the top 15 in NCAA home attendance eight times, including 10th in 1990 and 15th in 1996. The LSUNO attendance mark was set in 1987 when 85,884 (including postseason games) passed through its gates.

The park has played host to other events, including an exhibition series featuring the Italian National Team in the summer of 1990. UNO played host to and won the American South Conference Toumament in 1989. UNO and Maestri Field have also been host for the 1982 NCAA South Regional, the 1987 South II Regional, the 1984 American Legion World Series and a 1987 American Legion regional tourney.

== Gallery ==
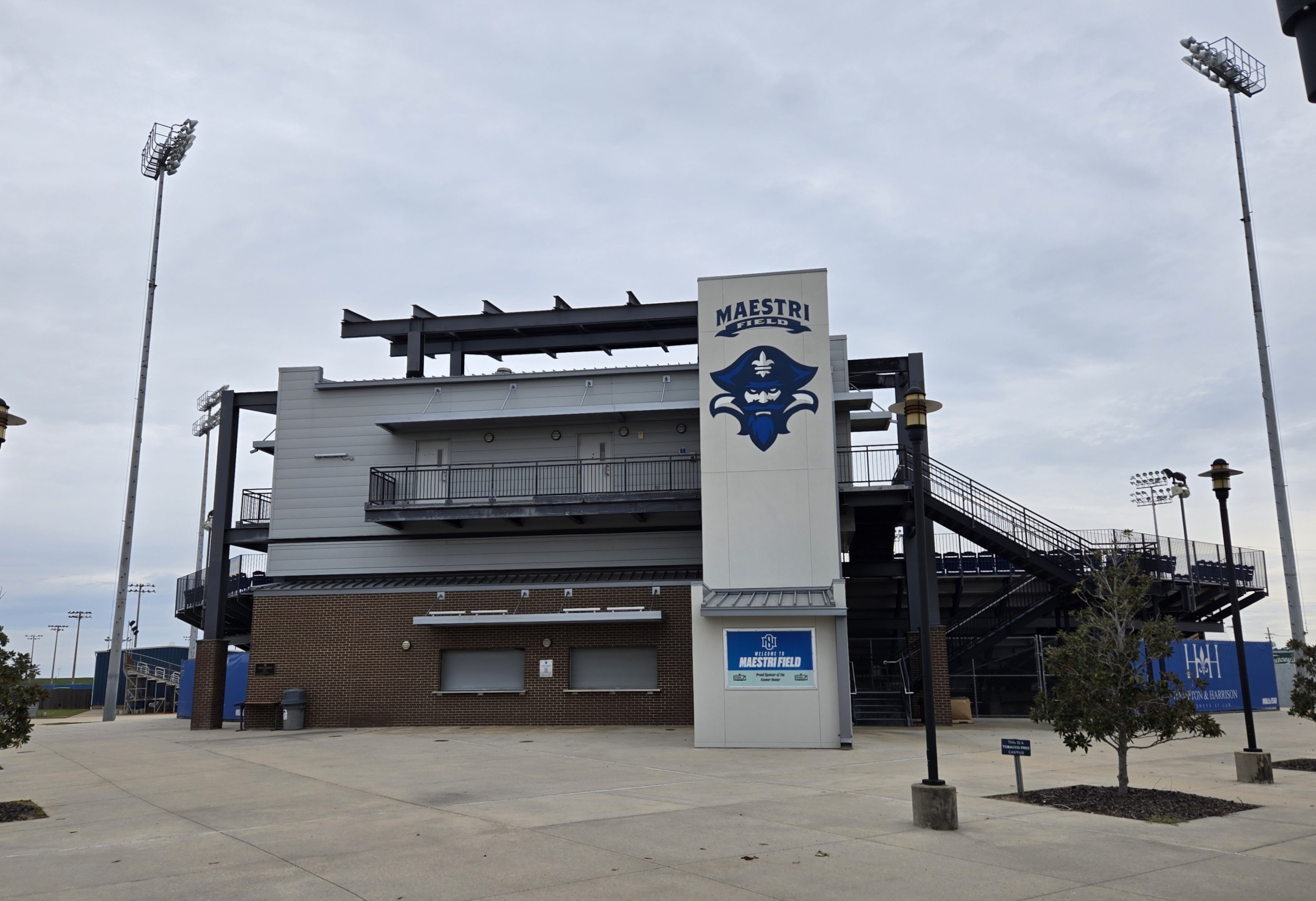
Maestri Field at Privateer Park Grandstand Exterior

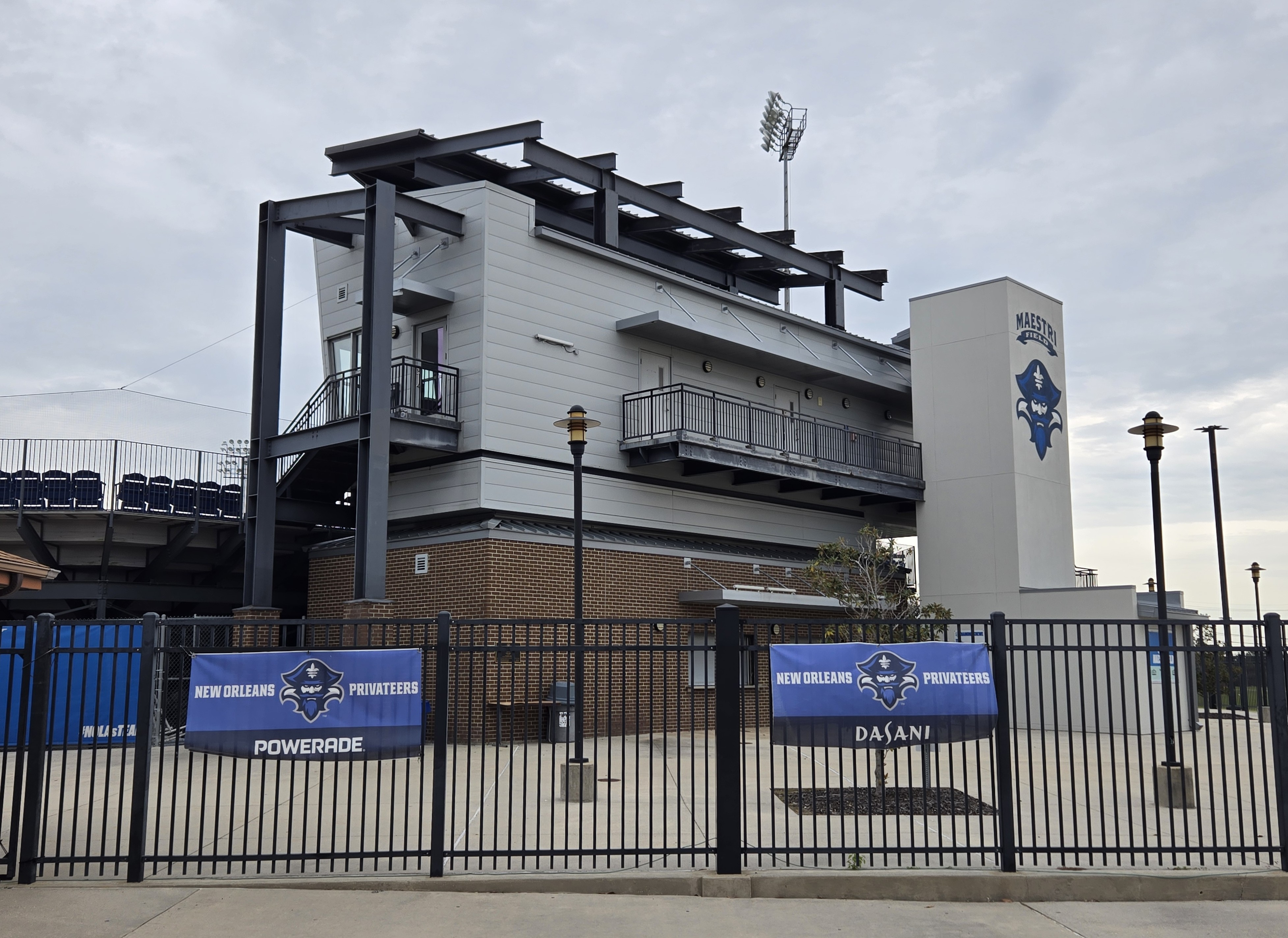
Maestri Field at Privateer Park Grandstand Exterior, Third Base Side

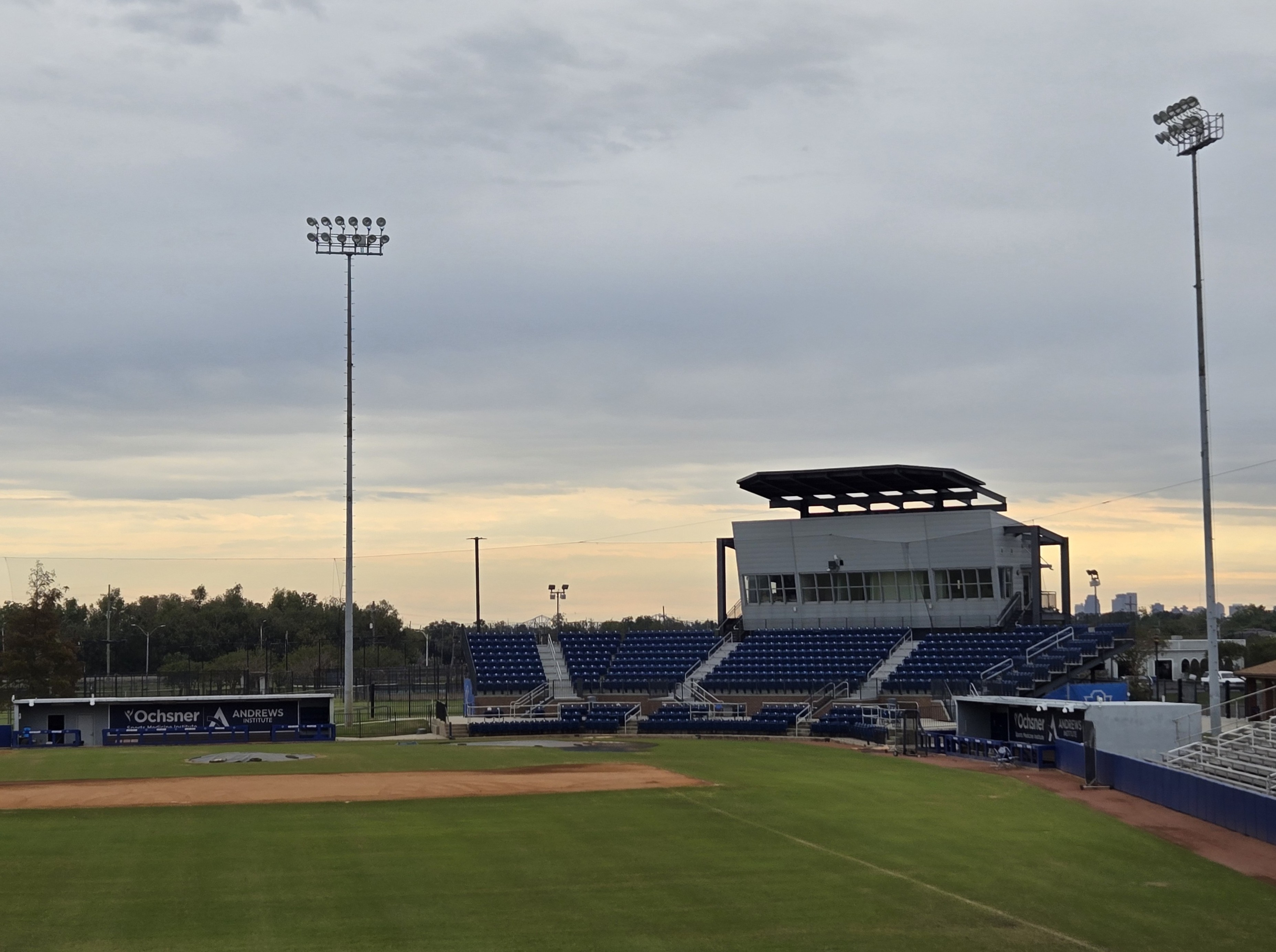
Maestri Field at Privateer Park Grandstand Interior

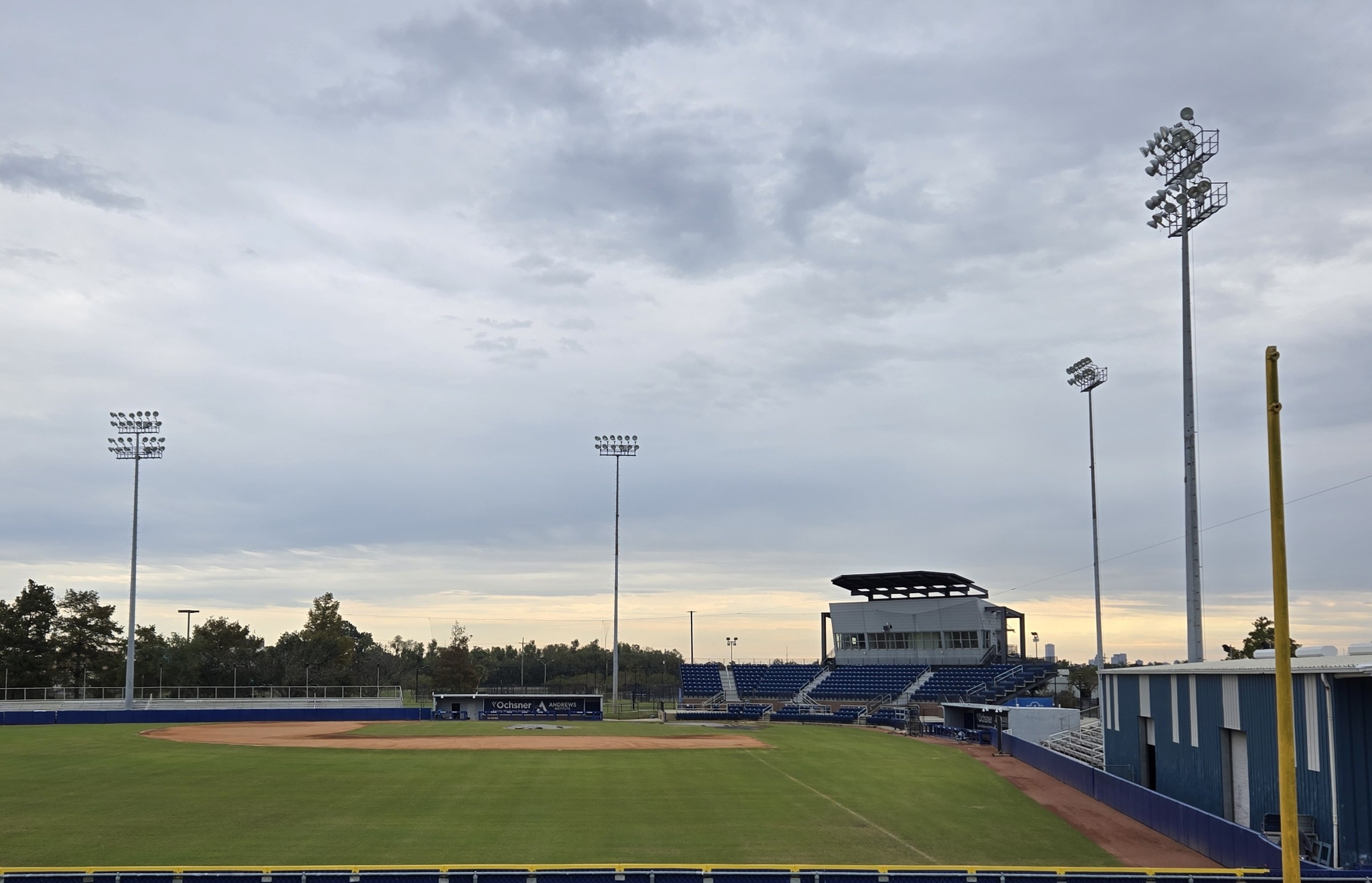
Maestri Field at Privateer Park and Indoor Facility

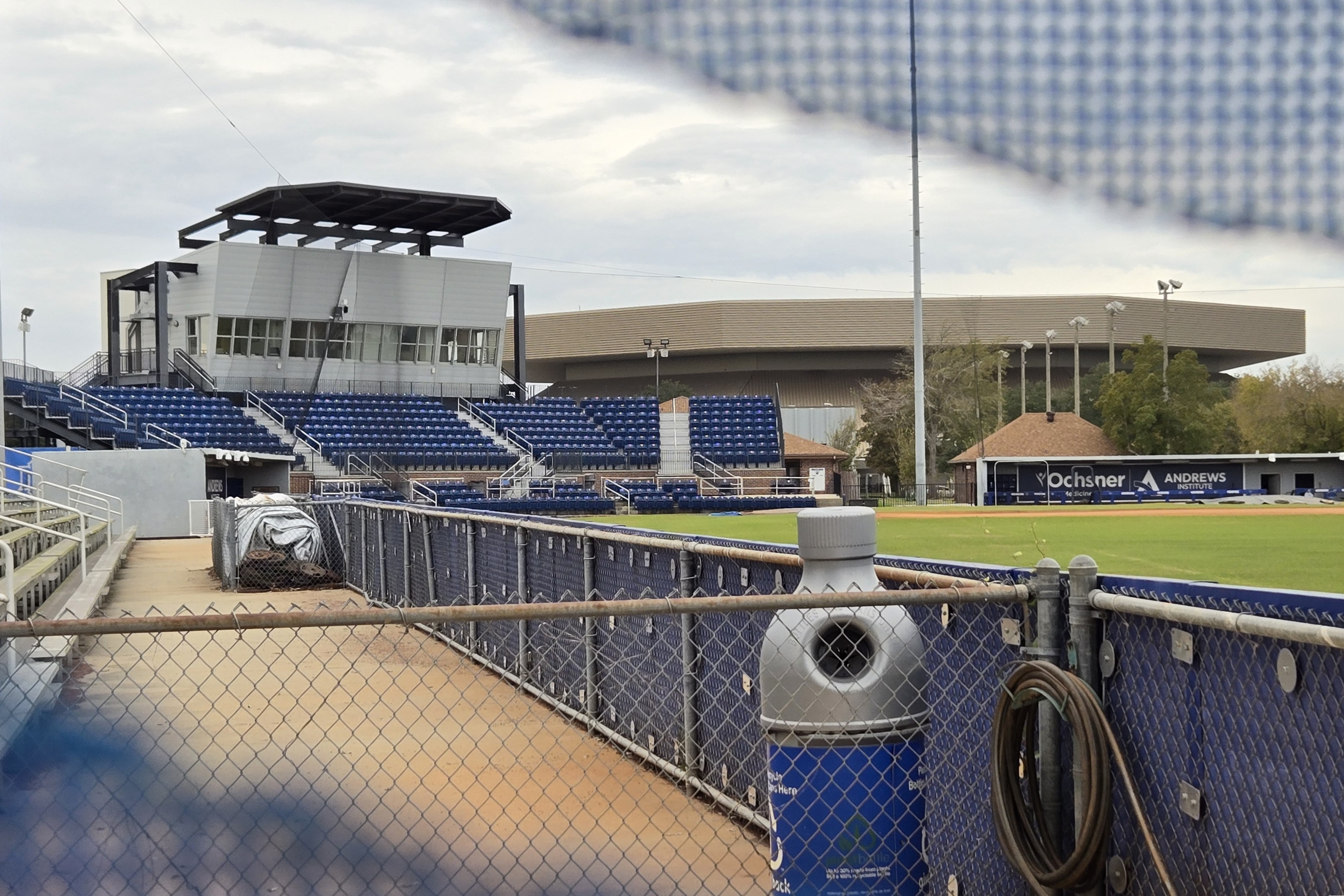
Maestri Field at Privateer Park and LSUNO Lakefront Arena

== See also ==
- List of NCAA Division I baseball venues
