= 2023–24 Little Rock Trojans women's basketball team =

American college basketball season

2023–24 Little Rock Trojans women's basketball
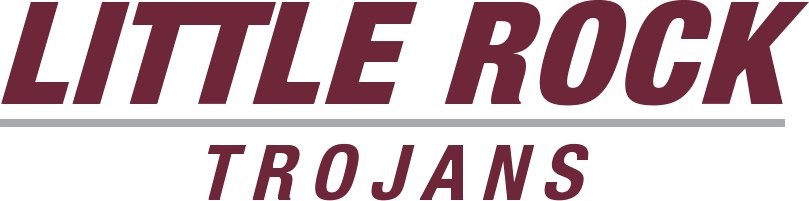
- Conference: Ohio Valley Conference
- Record: 12–18 (11–7 OVC)
- Head coach: Joe Foley (21st season)
- Assistant coaches: Alicia Cash; Steve Wiedower; Bobby Brasel
- Home arena: Jack Stephens Center

2023–24 Ohio Valley Conference women's basketball standings
	Conf.				Overall
Team	W		L	PCT	W		L	PCT
Southern Indiana* †	17	–	1	.944	25	–	7	.781
Little Rock	11	–	7	.611	12	–	18	.400
UT Martin	11	–	7	.611	16	–	17	.485
Eastern Illinois	11	–	7	.611	15	–	18	.455
Morehead State	10	–	8	.556	15	–	15	.500
Tennessee Tech	10	–	8	.556	16	–	15	.516
Western Illinois	9	–	9	.500	18	–	12	.600
Tennessee State	7	–	11	.389	11	–	19	.367
Southeast Missouri State	6	–	12	.333	9	–	20	.310
Lindenwood*	5	–	13	.278	7	–	21	.250
SIU Edwardsville	2	–	16	.111	5	–	26	.161
† 2024 OVC tournament winner * ineligible for the 2024 NCAA tournament due to transition period

The 2023–24 Little Rock Trojans women's basketball team represented the University of Arkansas at Little Rock during the 2023–24 NCAA Division I women's basketball season. The Trojans, led by 21st-year head coach Joe Foley, played their home games at the Jack Stephens Center located in Little Rock, Arkansas, as second-year members of the Ohio Valley Conference.

== Previous season ==
The Trojans finished the 2022–23 season 21–10, 17–1 in OVC play to finish as OVC regular season champions. They defeated Southeast Missouri State in the semifinals of the OVC tournament, before falling to Tennessee Tech in the championship game. They received an automatic bid into the WNIT, where they would be defeated by SMU in the first round.

== Roster ==
2023–24 Little Rock Trojans women's basketball team
Players
Coaches

Pos.	#	Name	Height	Year	Previous school	Hometown
F	0	Leilani Wimbish-Gay	5 ft 10 in (1.78 m)	Jr	Temple College	Victoria, Texas
F	1	Mira Hanna	6 ft 0 in (1.83 m)	So	Berkeley Prep	Tampa, Florida
G	2	Jaiyah Harris-Smith	5 ft 6 in (1.68 m)	Jr	Ole Miss	Miami, Florida
G	3	Jayla Brooks	5 ft 7 in (1.7 m)	Sr	Panola College	Sachse, Texas
G	4	Sha'Nequa Henry	5 ft 8 in (1.73 m)	Sr	Eastern Oklahoma State	Texarkana, Texas
G/F	5	Jordan Holman	5 ft 10 in (1.78 m)	Jr	Northern Oklahoma College	Hugo, Oklahoma
G	8	Courtney Davis	5 ft 5 in (1.65 m)	Jr	Highland Community College	Warner Robins, Georgia
G	10	Sug Williams	5 ft 8 in (1.73 m)	Sr	Oakland	Eastpointe, Michigan
F	11	Faith Lee	5 ft 11 in (1.8 m)	So	Ouachita Parish High School	Monroe, Louisiana
G	12	Tia Harvey	5 ft 9 in (1.75 m)	Sr	Sachse High School	Sachse, Texas
F/C	14	Trinity Hudson	6 ft 4 in (1.93 m)	Sr	Prairie View A&M	Little Rock, Arkansas
F	22	Mesi Triplett	6 ft 3 in (1.91 m)	Jr	St. Petersburg College	Orlando, Florida
F	23	Annemarie Batista	6 ft 1 in (1.85 m)	RS So	Mesa Community College	Tucson, Arizona
C	24	Camryn James	6 ft 3 in (1.91 m)	Jr	South Georgia Tech	Macon, Georgia
C	25	Emerald Parker	6 ft 3 in (1.91 m)	Fr	Carroll High School	Monroe, Louisiana

Head coach

- Joe Foley (Central Arkansas)

Assistant coach(es)

- Alicia Cash (Little Rock)
- Steve Wiedower (Arkansas State)
- Bobby Brasel (UT Permian Basin)

Legend

- (C) Team captain
- (S) Suspended
- (I) Ineligible
- (W) Walk-on
- Injured
- Current redshirt

Roster
Last update: March 13, 2024

== Schedule and results ==
Date time, TV	Rank^{#}	Opponent^{#}	Result	Record	Site (attendance) city, state
Non-conference regular season
November 6, 2023*; 5:00 pm, ESPN+		Missouri State	L 47–52	0–1	Jack Stephens Center (–); Little Rock, AR
November 11, 2023*; 1:00 pm, ESPN+		Kansas State	L 39–77	0–2	Jack Stephens Center (756); Little Rock, AR
November 14, 2023*; 7:00 pm, SECN+		at Arkansas	L 36–77	0–3	Bud Walton Arena (2,608); Fayetteville, AR
November 19, 2023*; 1:00 pm, ESPN+		Alabama	L 39–63	0–4	Jack Stephens Center (151); Little Rock, AR
November 25, 2023*; 3:00 pm, SECN+		at No. 24 Ole Miss	L 45–58	0–5	SJB Pavilion (2,258); Oxford, MS
December 2, 2023*; 1:00 pm, ESPN+		Central Arkansas; Governor's I-40 Showdown	L 58–63	0–6	Jack Stephens Center (657); Little Rock, AR
December 10, 2023*; 2:00 pm, ESPN+		Auburn	L 45–58	0–7	Jack Stephens Center (1,378); Little Rock, AR
December 14, 2023*; 6:00 pm, ESPN+		at Murray State	L 79–98	0–8	CFSB Center (937); Murray, KY
December 17, 2023*; 2:00 pm, ESPN+		at Arkansas State	L 59–74	0–9	First National Bank Arena (1,008); Jonesboro, AR
December 20, 2023*; 12:00 pm, ESPN+		at Tulane; Tulane Holiday Tournament	L 57–66	0–10	Devlin Fieldhouse (721); New Orleans, LA
December 21, 2023*; 11:00 am		vs. Duquesne; Tulane Holiday Tournament	W 63–52	1–10	Devlin Fieldhouse (565); New Orleans, LA
OVC regular season
December 28, 2023; 5:30 pm, ESPN+		at Tennessee Tech	W 59–57	2–10 (1–0)	Eblen Center (1,013); Cookeville, TN
December 30, 2023; 1:00 pm, ESPN+		at Tennessee State	L 78–83 ^{OT}	2–11 (1–1)	Gentry Complex (286); Nashville, TN
January 4, 2024; 5:00 pm, ESPN+		SIU Edwardsville	W 79–59	3–11 (2–1)	Jack Stephens Center (–); Little Rock, AR
January 6, 2024; 1:00 pm, ESPN+		Eastern Illinois	W 53–49	4–11 (3–1)	Jack Stephens Center (–); Little Rock, AR
January 13, 2024; 1:00 pm, ESPN+		at UT Martin	W 57–48	5–11 (4–1)	Skyhawk Arena (1,248); Martin, TN
January 18, 2024; 5:00 pm, ESPN+		at Southern Indiana	L 48–58	5–12 (4–2)	Screaming Eagles Arena (669); Evansville, IN
January 25, 2024; 11:30 am, ESPN+		Lindenwood	W 50–45	6–12 (5–2)	Jack Stephens Center (–); Little Rock, AR
January 27, 2024; 1:00 pm, ESPN+		Southeast Missouri State	W 53–47	7–12 (6–2)	Jack Stephens Center (423); Little Rock, AR
February 1, 2024; 5:00 pm, ESPN+		at SIU Edwardsville	L 61–67	7–13 (6–3)	First Community Arena (360); Edwardsville, IL
February 3, 2024; 1:00 pm, ESPN+		at Eastern Illinois	W 55–48	8–13 (7–3)	Groniger Arena (588); Charleston, IL
February 6, 2024; 5:00 pm, ESPN+		UT Martin	L 58–64	8–14 (7–4)	Jack Stephens Center (214); Little Rock, AR
February 8, 2024; 5:00 pm, ESPN+		at Western Illinois	W 50–41	9–14 (8–4)	Western Hall (796); Macomb, IL
February 15, 2024; 5:00 pm, ESPN+		Morehead State	L 47–50	9–15 (8–5)	Jack Stephens Center (473); Little Rock, AR
February 17, 2024; 1:00 pm, ESPN+		Southern Indiana	L 51–88	9–16 (8–6)	Jack Stephens Center (205); Little Rock, AR
February 22, 2024; 4:00 pm, ESPN+		at Southeast Missouri State	W 61–48	10–16 (9–6)	Show Me Center (625); Cape Girardeau, MO
February 24, 2024; 1:00 pm, ESPN+		at Lindenwood	L 54–61	10–17 (9–7)	Hyland Performance Arena (737); St. Charles, MO
February 29, 2024; 5:00 pm, ESPN+		Tennessee State	W 68–46	11–17 (10–7)	Jack Stephens Center (327); Little Rock, AR
March 2, 2024; 1:00 pm, ESPN+		Tennessee Tech	W 72–69 ^{OT}	12–17 (11–7)	Jack Stephens Center (717); Little Rock, AR
OVC tournament
March 8, 2024; 3:30 pm, ESPN+	(2)	vs. (3) UT Martin; Semifinals	L 48–54	12–18	Ford Center (1,157); Evansville, IN
*Non-conference game. ^{#}Rankings from AP Poll. (#) Tournament seedings in parentheses. All times are in Central.
