= 2023–24 Tennessee State Lady Tigers basketball team =

American college basketball season

2023–24 Tennessee State Lady Tigers basketball
- Conference: Ohio Valley Conference
- Record: 11–19 (7–11 OVC)
- Head coach: Ty Evans (4th season)
- Assistant coaches: Jaye Nayreau; Ayriell Robinson; Latessa Hickerson
- Home arena: Gentry Complex

2023–24 Ohio Valley Conference women's basketball standings
	Conf.				Overall
Team	W		L	PCT	W		L	PCT
Southern Indiana* †	17	–	1	.944	25	–	7	.781
Little Rock	11	–	7	.611	12	–	18	.400
UT Martin	11	–	7	.611	16	–	17	.485
Eastern Illinois	11	–	7	.611	15	–	18	.455
Morehead State	10	–	8	.556	15	–	15	.500
Tennessee Tech	10	–	8	.556	16	–	15	.516
Western Illinois	9	–	9	.500	18	–	12	.600
Tennessee State	7	–	11	.389	11	–	19	.367
Southeast Missouri State	6	–	12	.333	9	–	20	.310
Lindenwood*	5	–	13	.278	7	–	21	.250
SIU Edwardsville	2	–	16	.111	5	–	26	.161
† 2024 OVC tournament winner * ineligible for the 2024 NCAA tournament due to transition period

The 2023–24 Tennessee State Lady Tigers basketball team represented Tennessee State University during the 2023–24 NCAA Division I women's basketball season. The Lady Tigers, who were led by fourth-year head coach Ty Evans, played their home games at the Gentry Complex located in Nashville, Tennessee as members of the Ohio Valley Conference (OVC).

The Lady Tigers finished the season 11–19, 7–11 in OVC play, to finish in eighth place. They defeated Morehead State in the first round of the OVC tournament before falling to Eastern Illinois in the quarterfinals.

== Previous season ==
The Lady Tigers finished the 2022–23 season 11–18, 7–11 in OVC play, to finish in a three-way tie for sixth place. They were defeated by SIU Edwardsville in the first round of the OVC tournament.

== Roster ==
2023–24 Tennessee State Lady Tigers women's basketball team
Players
Coaches

Pos.	#	Name	Height	Year	Previous school	Hometown
G	0	Aaniya Webb	5 ft 11 in (1.8 m)	So	St. Bonaventure	Omaha, NE
G	1	Nia Hicks	5 ft 6 in (1.68 m)	Jr	Peachtree Ridge High School	Suwanee, GA
G	2	Caitlin Anderson	5 ft 6 in (1.68 m)	GS	Indiana State	Jefferson City, MO
F	3	Eboni Williams	6 ft 0 in (1.83 m)	GS	Chattanooga	Hoover, AL
G	4	Diamond Cannon	5 ft 10 in (1.78 m)	GS	UT Martin	Detroit, MI
F	5	Shequana Jackson	6 ft 5 in (1.96 m)	GS	Chowan	Brooklyn, NY
G	10	Saniah Parker	5 ft 9 in (1.75 m)	Jr	Mae Jemison High School	Huntsville, AL
F	11	Kennedy Davis	6 ft 0 in (1.83 m)	Sr	New Hope Academy	White Plains, MD
G	12	Corina Suarez-Tudela	5 ft 8 in (1.73 m)	Sr	Cochise College	Santa Cruz de Tenerife, Spain
F	14	Kameria Piggee	6 ft 1 in (1.85 m)	Jr	Mt. San Antonio College	Pasadena, CA
G	20	Sanaa' St. Andre	5 ft 8 in (1.73 m)	Sr	Kansas City	Oakdale, LA
G	21	Zyion Shannon	5 ft 8 in (1.73 m)	So	Stewarts Creek High School	Smyrna, TN
F	23	Jordan Aikens	6 ft 1 in (1.85 m)	GS	Southern	Chicago, IL
F	24	Lyric Cole	6 ft 0 in (1.83 m)	Jr	Austin Peay	Memphis, TN

Head coach

- Ty Evans (UW–Whitewater)

Assistant coach(es)

- Jaye Nayreau (Sam Houston State)
- Ayriell Robinson (Concordia–Irvine)
- Latessa Hickerson (Tennessee State)

Legend

- (C) Team captain
- (S) Suspended
- (I) Ineligible
- (W) Walk-on
- Injured
- Current redshirt

Roster
Last update: March 15, 2024

== Schedule and results ==
Date time, TV	Rank^{#}	Opponent^{#}	Result	Record	Site (attendance) city, state
Non-conference regular season
November 6, 2023*; 5:00 p.m., ESPN+		Wilberforce	W 53–47	1–0	Gentry Complex (362); Nashville, TN
November 10, 2023*; 1:00 p.m., ESPN+		at Charlotte	L 35–84	1–1	Dale F. Halton Arena (1,056); Charlotte, NC
November 12, 2023*; 1:00 p.m., ESPN+		at UNC Asheville	L 38–53	1–2	Kimmel Arena (341); Asheville, NC
November 17, 2023*; 5:30 p.m., ESPN+		Lipscomb	L 43–74	1–3	Gentry Complex (336); Nashville, TN
November 24, 2023*; 1:00 p.m.		vs. William & Mary; FIU Thanksgiving Classic	L 53–63	1–4	Ocean Bank Convocation Center (391); Miami, FL
November 26, 2023*; 11:00 a.m.		vs. Bryant; FIU Thanksgiving Classic	W 53–43	2–4	Ocean Bank Convocation Center (–); Miami, FL
December 1, 2023*; 5:00 p.m., ESPN+		at Cincinnati	L 52–76	2–5	Fifth Third Arena (1,072); Cincinnati, OH
December 3, 2023*; 1:00 p.m., ESPN+		at Akron	L 49–55	2–6	James A. Rhodes Arena (–); Akron, OH
December 15, 2023*; 5:30 p.m., ESPN+		Eastern Kentucky	L 69–79	2–7	Gentry Complex (174); Nashville, TN
December 21, 2023*; 12:00 p.m., ESPN+		Tennessee Southern	W 86–79 ^{OT}	3–7	Gentry Complex (144); Nashville, TN
Ohio Valley regular season
December 28, 2023; 5:00 p.m., ESPN+		UT Martin	L 69–75	3–8 (0–1)	Gentry Complex (274); Nashville, TN
December 30, 2023; 1:00 p.m., ESPN+		Little Rock	W 83–78 ^{OT}	4–8 (1–1)	Gentry Complex (286); Nashville, TN
January 4, 2024; 5:00 p.m., ESPN+		at Southern Indiana	L 57–78	4–9 (1–2)	Screaming Eagles Arena (530); Evansville, IN
January 6, 2024; 12:00 p.m., ESPN+		at Morehead State	L 78–86	4–10 (1–3)	Ellis Johnson Arena (1,050); Morehead, KY
January 13, 2024; 1:00 p.m., ESPN+		Lindenwood	W 83–80	5–10 (2–3)	Gentry Complex (–); Nashville, TN
January 18, 2024; 5:00 p.m., ESPN+		Tennessee Tech	L 81–86	5–11 (2–4)	Gentry Complex (262); Nashville, TN
January 20, 2024; 1:00 p.m., ESPN+		at Western Illinois	L 71–79 ^{OT}	5–12 (2–5)	Western Hall (861); Macomb, IL
January 27, 2024; 1:00 p.m., ESPN+		at Eastern Illinois	L 67–71 ^{OT}	5–13 (2–6)	Groniger Arena (841); Charleston, IL
February 1, 2024; 11:00 a.m., ESPN+		Morehead State	W 71–58	6–13 (3–6)	Gentry Complex (527); Nashville, TN
February 3, 2024; 1:00 p.m., ESPN+		Southern Indiana	W 65–58	7–13 (4–6)	Gentry Complex (433); Nashville, TN
February 8, 2024; 5:00 p.m., ESPN+		at Lindenwood	L 73–81 ^{2OT}	7–14 (4–7)	Hyland Performance Arena (903); St. Charles, MO
February 10, 2024; 1:30 p.m., ESPN+		at Southeast Missouri State	L 47–48	7–15 (4–8)	Show Me Center (381); Cape Girardeau, MO
February 13, 2024; 5:30 p.m., ESPN+		at Tennessee Tech	L 64–80	7–16 (4–9)	Eblen Center (–); Cookeville, TN
February 17, 2024; 1:00 p.m., ESPN+		Western Illinois	W 84–71	8–16 (5–9)	Gentry Complex (709); Nashville, TN
February 22, 2024; 5:00 p.m., ESPN+		Eastern Illinois	L 56–66	8–17 (5–10)	Gentry Complex (443); Nashville, TN
February 24, 2024; 1:00 p.m., ESPN+		SIU Edwardsville	W 75–65	9–17 (6–10)	Gentry Complex (669); Nashville, TN
February 29, 2024; 5:00 p.m., ESPN+		at Little Rock	L 46–68	9–18 (6–11)	Jack Stephens Center (327); Little Rock, AR
March 2, 2024; 1:00 p.m., ESPN+		at UT Martin	W 55–53	10–18 (7–11)	Skyhawk Arena (2,106); Martin, TN
Ohio Valley tournament
March 5, 2024; 1:00 p.m., ESPN+	(8)	vs. (5) Morehead State; First round	W 58–50	11–18	Ford Center (–); Evansville, IN
March 7, 2024; 1:00 p.m., ESPN+	(8)	vs. (4) Eastern Illinois; Quarterfinals	L 48–60	11–19	Ford Center (–); Evansville, IN
*Non-conference game. ^{#}Rankings from AP poll. (#) Tournament seedings in parentheses. All times are in Central.
