= 2023–24 UT Martin Skyhawks women's basketball team =

American college basketball season

2023–24 UT Martin Skyhawks women's basketball

NCAA tournament, First Four
- Conference: Ohio Valley Conference
- Record: 16–17 (11–7 OVC)
- Head coach: Kevin McMillan (15th season)
- Associate head coach: Jasmine Newsome
- Assistant coaches: Garner Small; Maddie Spencer
- Home arena: Skyhawk Arena

2023–24 Ohio Valley Conference women's basketball standings
	Conf.				Overall
Team	W		L	PCT	W		L	PCT
Southern Indiana* †	17	–	1	.944	25	–	7	.781
Little Rock	11	–	7	.611	12	–	18	.400
UT Martin	11	–	7	.611	16	–	17	.485
Eastern Illinois	11	–	7	.611	15	–	18	.455
Morehead State	10	–	8	.556	15	–	15	.500
Tennessee Tech	10	–	8	.556	16	–	15	.516
Western Illinois	9	–	9	.500	18	–	12	.600
Tennessee State	7	–	11	.389	11	–	19	.367
Southeast Missouri State	6	–	12	.333	9	–	20	.310
Lindenwood*	5	–	13	.278	7	–	21	.250
SIU Edwardsville	2	–	16	.111	5	–	26	.161
† 2024 OVC tournament winner * ineligible for the 2024 NCAA tournament due to transition period

The 2023–24 UT Martin Skyhawks women's basketball team represented the University of Tennessee at Martin during the 2023–24 NCAA Division I women's basketball season. The Skyhawks, led by 15th-year head coach Kevin McMillan, played their home games at Skyhawk Arena located in Martin, Tennessee as members of the Ohio Valley Conference.

== Previous season ==
The Skyhawks finished the 2022–23 season 13–7, 9–9 in OVC play to finish in fifth place. They were upset by Morehead State in the first round of the OVC tournament.

== Roster ==
2023–24 UT Martin Skyhawks women's basketball team
Players
Coaches

Pos.	#	Name	Height	Year	Previous school	Hometown
G	0	Sydneey Boykin	5 ft 9 in (1.75 m)	Sr	Mercer	Clarksville, Tennessee
G	2	Love Mays	5 ft 8 in (1.73 m)	Fr	Danville High School	Harrodsburg, Kentucky
G	3	Ally Collett	5 ft 7 in (1.7 m)	RS Jr	Eastern Kentucky	London, Kentucky
F	4	Anaya Brown	6 ft 1 in (1.85 m)	So	Lafayette High School	Lexington, Kentucky
F	5	Mah Minthe	5 ft 10 in (1.78 m)	Jr	Clarendon College	Paris, France
G	10	Amari Bonds	5 ft 9 in (1.75 m)	Fr	Union City High School	Union City, Tennessee
G	11	Shae Littleford	5 ft 7 in (1.7 m)	Jr	Charleston High School	Charleston, Illinois
F	12	Lexi Rubel	6 ft 1 in (1.85 m)	So	Notre Dame High School	Cape Girardeau, Missouri
G	15	Morgan Borgstadt	6 ft 0 in (1.83 m)	Fr	Verdigris High School	Claremore, Oklahoma
F	20	Tori Rubel	6 ft 1 in (1.85 m)	Fr	Notre Dame High School	Cape Girardeau, Missouri
G	23	Kendal George	5 ft 9 in (1.75 m)	Fr	Centerville High School	Centerville, Ohio
G/F	24	Kiya Dorroh	6 ft 1 in (1.85 m)	Jr	Colorado State	Tucson, Arizona
F	25	Norah Clark	6 ft 1 in (1.85 m)	Fr	Nixa High School	Springfield, Missouri
F	32	Sophie Singleton	5 ft 10 in (1.78 m)	Fr	Huntingdon High School	Huntingdon, Tennessee
G	33	Josie Storey	5 ft 10 in (1.78 m)	So	Mountain View High School	Mountain View, Arkansas
G	44	Kenley McCarn	5 ft 11 in (1.8 m)	RS Fr	Melbourne High School	Melbourne, Arkansas

Head coach

- Kevin McMillan (Rhodes)

Assistant coach(es)

- Jasmine Newsome (UT Martin)
- Garner Small (Olivet)
- Maddie Spencer (UT Martin)

Legend

- (C) Team captain
- (S) Suspended
- (I) Ineligible
- (W) Walk-on
- Injured
- Current redshirt

Roster
Last update: March 13, 2024

== Schedule and results ==
Date time, TV	Rank^{#}	Opponent^{#}	Result	Record	Site (attendance) city, state
Exhibition
October 30, 2023*; 6:00 pm		Blue Mountain Christian	W 91–31	–	Skyhawk Arena (–); Martin, TN
Non-conference regular season
November 6, 2023*; 12:00 pm, FloHoops		at Marquette	L 51–84	0–1	Al McGuire Center (3,211); Milwaukee, WI
November 9, 2023*; 5:30 pm, ESPN+		Vanderbilt	L 68–70	0–2	Skyhawk Arena (1,987); Martin, TN
November 14, 2023*; 6:30 pm, ESPN+		at Central Arkansas	L 45–56	0–3	Farris Center (–); Conway, AR
November 18, 2023*; 1:00 pm, ESPN+		South Dakota State	L 38–55	0–4	Skyhawk Arena (1,102); Martin, TN
November 21, 2023*; 6:00 pm, ESPN+		at North Alabama	L 63–70	0–5	CB&S Bank Arena (1,063); Florence, AL
November 28, 2023*; 6:00 pm, ESPN+		at Murray State	L 75–88	0–6	CFSB Center (1,372); Murray, KY
December 2, 2023*; 1:00 pm, ESPN+		Evansville	W 94–82	1–6	Skyhawk Arena (1,012); Martin, TN
December 9, 2023*; 3:33 pm, ESPN+		at Troy	L 59–71	1–7	Trojan Arena (1,484); Troy, AL
December 13, 2023*; 11:00 am, ESPN+		Freed–Hardeman	W 69–41	2–7	Skyhawk Arena (3,130); Martin, TN
December 16, 2023*; 1:00 pm, ESPN+		South Dakota	L 74–80 ^{OT}	2–8	Skyhawk Arena (756); Martin, TN
December 21, 2023*; 2:00 pm, ESPN+		at Arkansas State	W 67–62	3–8	First National Bank Arena (683); Jonesboro, AR
OVC regular season
December 28, 2023; 5:00 pm, ESPN+		at Tennessee State	W 75–69	4–8 (1–0)	Gentry Complex (274); Nashville, TN
December 30, 2023; 1:00 pm, ESPN+		at Tennessee Tech	W 67–58	5–8 (2–0)	Eblen Center (977); Cookeville, TN
January 4, 2024; 5:00 pm, ESPN+		Eastern Illinois	L 70–72	5–9 (2–1)	Skyhawk Arena (1,107); Martin, TN
January 11, 2024; 5:30 pm, ESPN+		Western Illinois	W 68–49	6–9 (3–1)	Skyhawk Arena (1,112); Martin, TN
January 13, 2024; 1:00 pm, ESPN+		Little Rock	L 48–57	6–10 (3–2)	Skyhawk Arena (1,248); Martin, TN
January 18, 2024; 4:00 pm, ESPN+		at Morehead State	L 38–56	6–11 (3–3)	Ellis Johnson Arena (475); Morehead, KY
January 25, 2024; 5:30 pm, ESPN+		Southeast Missouri State	W 52–44	7–11 (4–3)	Skyhawk Arena (1,483); Martin, TN
January 27, 2024; 1:00 pm, ESPN+		Lindenwood	L 68–73	7–12 (4–4)	Skyhawk Arena (895); Martin, TN
February 1, 2024; 5:00 pm, ESPN+		at Eastern Illinois	W 80–65	8–12 (5–4)	Groniger Arena (568); Charleston, IL
February 3, 2024; 1:00 pm, ESPN+		at SIU Edwardsville	W 75–46	9–12 (6–4)	First Community Arena (546); Edwardsville, IL
February 6, 2024; 5:00 pm, ESPN+		at Little Rock	W 64–58	10–12 (7–4)	Jack Stephens Center (214); Little Rock, AR
February 10, 2024; 2:00 pm, ESPN+		at Western Illinois	L 61–71	10–13 (7–5)	Western Hall (786); Macomb, IL
February 15, 2024; 5:30 pm, ESPN+		Southern Indiana	L 67–73	10–14 (7–6)	Skyhawk Arena (863); Martin, TN
February 17, 2024; 1:00 pm, ESPN+		Morehead State	W 70–54	11–14 (8–6)	Skyhawk Arena (1,194); Martin, TN
February 22, 2024; 5:00 pm, ESPN+		at Lindenwood	W 65–56	12–14 (9–6)	Hyland Performance Arena (719); St. Charles, MO
February 24, 2024; 1:30 pm, ESPN+		at Southeast Missouri State	W 64–61	13–14 (10–6)	Show Me Center (565); Cape Girardeau, MO
February 29, 2024; 5:30 pm, ESPN+		Tennessee Tech	W 67–37	14–14 (11–6)	Skyhawk Arena (1,669); Martin, TN
March 2, 2024; 1:00 pm, ESPN+		Tennessee State	L 53–55	14–15 (11–7)	Skyhawk Arena (2,106); Martin, TN
OVC tournament
March 7, 2024; 3:30 pm, ESPN+	(3)	vs. (6) Tennessee Tech; Quarterfinals	W 79–71	15–15	Ford Center (830); Evansville, IN
March 8, 2024; 3:30 pm, ESPN+	(3)	vs. (2) Little Rock; Semifinals	W 54–48	16–15	Ford Center (1,157); Evansville, IN
March 9, 2024; 2:00 pm, ESPN+	(3)	vs. (1) Southern Indiana; Championship	L 53–81	16–16	Ford Center (1,715); Evansville, IN
NCAA tournament
March 21, 2024; 8:00 pm, ESPN2	(16 A2)	vs. (16 A2) Holy Cross; First Four	L 45–72	16–17	Carver–Hawkeye Arena (1,092); Iowa City, IA
*Non-conference game. ^{#}Rankings from AP Poll. (#) Tournament seedings in parentheses. All times are in Central.
