= 2023–24 SIU Edwardsville Cougars women's basketball team =

American college basketball season

2023–24 SIU Edwardsville Cougars women's basketball
- Conference: Ohio Valley Conference
- Record: 5–26 (2–16 OVC)
- Head coach: Samantha Quigley Smith (3rd season)
- Assistant coaches: Ariel Massengale; Liz Doran; Eric Gruber
- Home arena: First Community Arena

2023–24 Ohio Valley Conference women's basketball standings
| | Conf. | | | | Overall |
| Team | W | | L | PCT | W | | L | PCT |
|---|---|---|---|---|---|---|---|---|
| Southern Indiana* † | 17 | – | 1 | .944 | 25 | – | 7 | .781 |
| Little Rock | 11 | – | 7 | .611 | 12 | – | 18 | .400 |
| UT Martin | 11 | – | 7 | .611 | 16 | – | 17 | .485 |
| Eastern Illinois | 11 | – | 7 | .611 | 15 | – | 18 | .455 |
| Morehead State | 10 | – | 8 | .556 | 15 | – | 15 | .500 |
| Tennessee Tech | 10 | – | 8 | .556 | 16 | – | 15 | .516 |
| Western Illinois | 9 | – | 9 | .500 | 18 | – | 12 | .600 |
| Tennessee State | 7 | – | 11 | .389 | 11 | – | 19 | .367 |
| Southeast Missouri State | 6 | – | 12 | .333 | 9 | – | 20 | .310 |
| Lindenwood* | 5 | – | 13 | .278 | 7 | – | 21 | .250 |
| SIU Edwardsville | 2 | – | 16 | .111 | 5 | – | 26 | .161 |
† 2024 OVC tournament winner * ineligible for the 2024 NCAA tournament due to transition period

The 2023–24 SIU Edwardsville Cougars women's basketball team represented Southern Illinois University Edwardsville during the 2023–24 NCAA Division I women's basketball season. The Cougars, who were led by third-year head coach Samantha Quigley Smith, played their home games at the First Community Arena in Edwardsville, Illinois as members of the Ohio Valley Conference (OVC). They finished the season 5–26, 2–16 in OVC play, to finish in eleventh (last) place.

== Previous season ==
The Cougars finished the 2022–23 season 9–22, 7–11 in OVC play, to finish in a tie for sixth place. They defeated Tennessee State in the first round of the OVC tournament before falling to eventual tournament champions Tennessee Tech in the quarterfinals.

== Roster ==
2023–24 SIU Edwardsville Cougars women's basketball team
Players
Coaches

| Pos. | # | Name | Height | Year | Previous school | Hometown |
|---|---|---|---|---|---|---|
| F | 0 | Olivia Clayton | 6 ft 2 in (1.88 m) | Sr | Tulsa | Checotah, OK |
| G | 1 | Ava Stoller | 5 ft 6 in (1.68 m) | Fr | St. Petersburg High School | St. Petersburg, FL |
| G | 4 | Macy Silvey | 5 ft 10 in (1.78 m) | So | Edwardsville High School | Glen Carbon, IL |
| G | 5 | Lezhauria Williams | 5 ft 8 in (1.73 m) | Jr | Rend Lake College | Springfield, IL |
| G | 10 | Emiyah Cobb | 5 ft 9 in (1.75 m) | Fr | Northwest High School | Clarksville, TN |
| G | 11 | Ava Gugliuzza | 5 ft 5 in (1.65 m) | Fr | Lincoln-Way West High School | New Lenox, IL |
| G | 12 | Alexis Legan | 5 ft 9 in (1.75 m) | Sr | Orange Coast College | Palm Desert, CA |
| G | 14 | Molly Sheehan | 5 ft 8 in (1.73 m) | Jr | Valparaiso | Hinsdale, IL |
| F | 15 | Halle Smith | 6 ft 0 in (1.83 m) | Jr | Southeast Missouri State | Belle, MO |
| G | 22 | Kyra Williams | 5 ft 6 in (1.68 m) | Fr | Homeschool | Troy, IL |
| G | 24 | Sofie Lowis | 5 ft 8 in (1.73 m) | Jr | Sacred Heart-Griffin High School | Springfield, IL |
| F | 25 | Brianna Wooldridge | 6 ft 1 in (1.85 m) | So | IUPUI | Elgin, IL |
| G | 33 | KK Rodriguez | 5 ft 6 in (1.68 m) | GS | Tulsa | St. Louis, MO |

Head coach

- Samantha Quigley Smith (DePaul)

Assistant coach(es)

- Ariel Massengale (Tennessee)
- Liz Doran (Oglethorpe)
- Eric Gruber (North Central)

Legend

- (C) Team captain
- (S) Suspended
- (I) Ineligible
- (W) Walk-on
- Injured
- Current redshirt

Roster
Last update: March 19, 2024

== Schedule and results ==
| Date time, TV | Rank^{#} | Opponent^{#} | Result | Record | Site (attendance) city, state |
Exhibition
| November 2, 2023*; 7:00 p.m. | | Maryville | W 85–66 | – | First Community Arena (–); Edwardsville, IL |
Non-conference regular season
| November 6, 2023*; 5:00 p.m., ESPN+ | | at Oklahoma State | L 59–100 | 0–1 | Gallagher-Iba Arena (–); Stillwater, OK |
| November 9, 2023*; 5:00 p.m., ESPN+ | | Eastern Kentucky; Tri-State Challenge | L 72–74 | 0–2 | First Community Arena (473); Edwardsville, IL |
| November 12, 2023*; 1:00 p.m., ESPN+ | | Evansville; Tri-State Challenge | W 91–83 | 1–2 | First Community Arena (448); Edwardsville, IL |
| November 15, 2023*; 11:00 a.m., ESPN+ | | at Illinois State | L 86–90 | 1–3 | CEFCU Arena (7,581); Normal, IL |
| November 18, 2023*; 2:30 p.m., ESPN+ | | at Eastern Michigan | L 65–68 | 1–4 | George Gervin GameAbove Center (2,985); Ypsilanti, MI |
| November 20, 2023*; 6:00 p.m., ESPN+ | | at Dayton | L 74–75 | 1–5 | UD Arena (1,568); Dayton, OH |
| November 26, 2023*; 1:00 p.m., ESPN+ | | Middle Tennessee | L 74–81 | 1–6 | First Community Arena (303); Edwardsville, IL |
| November 29, 2023*; 6:00 p.m., B1G+ | | at Michigan | L 59–103 | 1–7 | Crisler Center (2,145); Ann Arbor, MI |
| December 3, 2023*; 1:00 p.m., ESPN+ | | Northern Illinois | W 89–79 | 2–7 | First Community Arena (467); Edwardsville, IL |
| December 6, 2023*; 11:00 a.m., ESPN+ | | at Southern Illinois | L 53–77 | 2–8 | Banterra Center (5,000); Carbondale, IL |
| December 15, 2023*; 6:00 p.m., FloHoops | | at Xavier | L 43–68 | 2–9 | Cintas Center (361); Cincinnati, OH |
| December 18, 2023*; 11:00 a.m., ESPN+ | | at Loyola Chicago | L 74–77 | 2–10 | Joseph J. Gentile Arena (3,747); Chicago, IL |
| December 20, 2023*; 7:00 p.m., ESPN+ | | Harris–Stowe State | W 106–38 | 3–10 | First Community Arena (283); Edwardsville, IL |
OVC regular season
| December 29, 2023; 5:00 p.m., ESPN+ | | Eastern Illinois | L 74–80 | 3–11 (0–1) | First Community Arena (869); Edwardsville, IL |
| December 31, 2023; 1:00 p.m., ESPN+ | | Western Illinois | L 75–81 | 3–12 (0–2) | First Community Arena (1,021); Edwardsville, IL |
| January 4, 2024; 5:00 p.m., ESPN+ | | at Little Rock | L 59–79 | 3–13 (0–3) | Jack Stephens Center (–); Little Rock, AR |
| January 11, 2024; 5:00 p.m., ESPN+ | | Southern Indiana | L 64–87 | 3–14 (0–4) | First Community Arena (617); Edwardsville, IL |
| January 13, 2024; 2:00 p.m., ESPN+ | | Morehead State | L 64–77 | 3–15 (0–5) | First Community Arena (513); Edwardsville, IL |
| January 18, 2024; 5:00 p.m., ESPN+ | | at Lindenwood | L 73–79 | 3–16 (0–6) | Hyland Performance Arena (789); St. Charles, MO |
| January 20, 2024; 1:30 p.m., ESPN+ | | at Southeast Missouri State | L 72–86 | 3–17 (0–7) | Show Me Center (485); Cape Girardeau, MO |
| January 27, 2024; 1:00 p.m., ESPN+ | | Tennessee Tech | L 58–67 | 3–18 (0–8) | First Community Arena (689); Edwardsville, IL |
| February 1, 2024; 5:00 p.m., ESPN+ | | Little Rock | W 67–61 | 4–18 (1–8) | First Community Arena (360); Edwardsville, IL |
| February 3, 2024; 1:00 p.m., ESPN+ | | UT Martin | L 46–75 | 4–19 (1–9) | First Community Arena (546); Edwardsville, IL |
| February 8, 2024; 5:00 p.m., ESPN+ | | at Morehead State | L 66–69 | 4–20 (1–10) | Ellis Johnson Arena (1,010); Morehead, KY |
| February 10, 2024; 5:00 p.m., ESPN+ | | at Southern Indiana | L 58–75 | 4–21 (1–11) | Screaming Eagles Arena (2,031); Evansville, IN |
| February 15, 2024; 5:00 p.m., ESPN+ | | Lindenwood | W 69–67 | 5–21 (2–11) | First Community Arena (762); Edwardsville, IL |
| February 17, 2024; 1:00 p.m., ESPN+ | | Southeast Missouri State | L 57–67 | 5–22 (2–12) | First Community Arena (719); Edwardsville, IL |
| February 22, 2024; 5:30 p.m., ESPN+ | | at Tennessee Tech | L 76–86 | 5–23 (2–13) | Eblen Center (920); Cookeville, TN |
| February 24, 2024; 1:00 p.m., ESPN+ | | at Tennessee State | L 65–75 | 5–24 (2–14) | Gentry Complex (669); Nashville, TN |
| February 27, 2024; 5:00 p.m., ESPN+ | | at Eastern Illinois | L 66–80 | 5–25 (2–15) | Groniger Arena (1,056); Charleston, IL |
| March 2, 2024; 1:00 p.m., ESPN+ | | at Western Illinois | L 56–84 | 5–26 (2–16) | Western Hall (798); Macomb, IL |
*Non-conference game. ^{#}Rankings from AP poll. (#) Tournament seedings in parentheses. All times are in Central.
