= 2023–24 Eastern Illinois Panthers women's basketball team =

American college basketball season

2023–24 Eastern Illinois Panthers women's basketball
- Conference: Ohio Valley Conference
- Record: 15–18 (11–7 OVC)
- Head coach: Matt Bollant (7th season)
- Associate head coach: Marqus McGlothan
- Assistant coaches: Allie Alexander; Kiara Carter; Regan Bollant
- Home arena: Groniger Arena

2023–24 Ohio Valley Conference women's basketball standings
	Conf.				Overall
Team	W		L	PCT	W		L	PCT
Southern Indiana* †	17	–	1	.944	25	–	7	.781
Little Rock	11	–	7	.611	12	–	18	.400
UT Martin	11	–	7	.611	16	–	17	.485
Eastern Illinois	11	–	7	.611	15	–	18	.455
Morehead State	10	–	8	.556	15	–	15	.500
Tennessee Tech	10	–	8	.556	16	–	15	.516
Western Illinois	9	–	9	.500	18	–	12	.600
Tennessee State	7	–	11	.389	11	–	19	.367
Southeast Missouri State	6	–	12	.333	9	–	20	.310
Lindenwood*	5	–	13	.278	7	–	21	.250
SIU Edwardsville	2	–	16	.111	5	–	26	.161
† 2024 OVC tournament winner * ineligible for the 2024 NCAA tournament due to transition period

The 2023–24 Eastern Illinois Panthers women's basketball team represented Eastern Illinois University during the 2023–24 NCAA Division I women's basketball season. The Panthers, led by seventh-year head coach Matt Bollant, played their home games at the newly renamed Groniger Arena (Note: On November 25, it was announced that the arena, known as Lantz Arena, would be renamed to Groniger Arena, "following a seven-figure gift by longtime benefactor Jerry Groniger".) located in Charleston, Illinois as members of the Ohio Valley Conference (OVC).

The Panthers finished the season 15–18, 11–7 in OVC play, to finish in a three-way tie for second place. They defeated Tennessee State before falling to top-seeded and eventual tournament champions Southern Indiana in the semifinals of the OVC tournament.

On May 20, 2024, head coach Matt Bollant announced that he would be leaving the program after seven seasons, in order to retake the head coaching position at Bryan College, a position he held from 2002 to 2007, with associate head coach Marqus McGlothan being named the interim head coach for the 2024–25 season.

== Previous season ==
The Panthers finished the 2022–23 season 21–8, 14–4 in OVC play, to finish in second place. They were defeated by eventual tournament champions Tennessee Tech in the semifinals of the OVC tournament.

== Roster ==
2023–24 Eastern Illinois Panthers women's basketball team
Players
Coaches

Pos.	#	Name	Height	Year	Previous school	Hometown
G	0	Lalani Ellis	5 ft 8 in (1.73 m)	Fr	Milwaukee Academy of Science	Milwaukee, WI
F	1	Ella Lune	6 ft 0 in (1.83 m)	RS Fr	Brimfield HS	Brimfield, IL
F	2	Emily Meidel	5 ft 11 in (1.8 m)	Sr	Lincoln Land CC	Danville, IL
G	3	Miah Monahan	5 ft 8 in (1.73 m)	Jr	Glencoe-Silver Lake HS	Silver Lake, MN
G	4	Lyric Johnson	5 ft 9 in (1.75 m)	So	Hortonville HS	Hortonville, WI
G	10	Adriana Arroyo	5 ft 9 in (1.75 m)	Fr	CB Alcobendas	Madrid, Spain
G	11	Alana Vinson	5 ft 11 in (1.8 m)	RS Jr	Roncalli HS	Indianapolis, IN
G	12	Charita "Tiny" Lewis	5 ft 6 in (1.68 m)	So	NDSCS	St. Cloud, MN
C	14	Ellie Colson	6 ft 1 in (1.85 m)	Jr	Summit HS	Thompson's Station, TN
F	15	Georgia Cox	6 ft 4 in (1.93 m)	Fr	Ballarat Rush	Ballarat, Australia
G	20	Julia Bengtson	5 ft 8 in (1.73 m)	Jr	Becker HS	Becker, MN
F	21	Hannah Purcell	6 ft 0 in (1.83 m)	Sr	DePaul	Annandale, MN
F	23	Sydney-James Desroches	6 ft 0 in (1.83 m)	RS Fr	Rossview HS	Miami, FL
G	24	Ellie Buzzelle	5 ft 8 in (1.73 m)	So	Grand Canyon	Rogers, MN
F	25	Taris Thornton	6 ft 0 in (1.83 m)	Jr	Willowbrook HS	Chicago, IL
F	33	Macy McGlone	6 ft 3 in (1.91 m)	Jr	Milwaukee	Greenville, WI

Head coach

- Matt Bollant (Winona State)

Assistant coach(es)

- Marqus McGlothan (St. Cloud State)
- Allie Alexander (Green Bay)
- Kiara Carter (Michigan State)
- Regan Bollant (Milligan)

Legend

- (C) Team captain
- (S) Suspended
- (I) Ineligible
- (W) Walk-on
- Injured
- Current redshirt

Roster
Last update: March 14, 2024

== Schedule and results ==
Date time, TV	Rank^{#}	Opponent^{#}	Result	Record	Site (attendance) city, state
Exhibition
November 2, 2023*; 6:00 p.m.		Chicago State; Maui Disaster Relief Charity Game	W 86–64	–	Lantz Arena (–); Charleston, IL
Non-conference regular season
November 6, 2023*; 6:00 p.m., ESPN+		at IUPUI	L 72–77	0–1	IUPUI Gymnasium (501); Indianapolis, IN
November 9, 2023*; 6:00 p.m., B1G+		at No. 9 Indiana	L 43–96	0–2	Simon Skjodt Assembly Hall (8,380); Bloomington, IN
November 12, 2023*; 2:00 p.m., ESPN+		Valparaiso	W 75–62	1–2	Lantz Arena (545); Charleston, IL
November 24, 2023*; 1:00 p.m.		vs. Nicholls; GCU Women's Basketball Classic	L 55–63	1–3	GCU Arena (212); Phoenix, AZ
November 25, 2023*; 1:00 p.m.		vs. Fresno State; GCU Women's Basketball Classic	L 60–70	1–4	GCU Arena (114); Phoenix, AZ
November 28, 2023*; 8:00 p.m., MW Network		at New Mexico	L 78–81 ^{OT}	1–5	The Pit (4,471); Albuquerque, NM
December 2, 2023*; 12:00 p.m., ESPN+		at Loyola Chicago	L 44–58	1–6	Joseph J. Gentile Arena (615); Chicago, IL
December 5, 2023*; 6:00 p.m., ESPN+		at Bradley	W 79–67	2–6	Renaissance Coliseum (372); Peoria, IL
December 7, 2023*; 12:00 p.m., ESPN+		North Dakota	W 67–55	3–6	Groniger Arena (2,546); Charleston, IL
December 9, 2023*; 3:00 p.m., ESPN+		at Wright State	L 67–81	3–7	Nutter Center (1,219); Fairborn, OH
December 15, 2023*; 6:00 p.m., ESPN+		Milwaukee	L 52–59	3–8	Laker Fieldhouse (175); Mattoon, IL
December 18, 2023*; 5:00 p.m., ESPN+		at Northern Illinois	L 55–65	3–9	Convocation Center (326); DeKalb, IL
December 21, 2023*; 6:30 p.m., B1G+		at Wisconsin	L 64–76	3–10	Kohl Center (3,622); Madison, WI
Ohio Valley regular season
December 29, 2023; 5:00 p.m., ESPN+		at SIU Edwardsville	W 80–74	4–10 (1–0)	First Community Arena (–); Edwardsville, IL
January 4, 2024; 5:00 p.m., ESPN+		at UT Martin	W 72–70	5–10 (2–0)	Skyhawk Arena (1,107); Martin, TN
January 6, 2024; 1:00 p.m., ESPN+		at Little Rock	L 49–53	5–11 (2–1)	Jack Stephens Center (–); Little Rock, AR
January 11, 2024; 5:00 p.m., ESPN+		Morehead State	L 67–69	5–12 (2–2)	Groniger Arena (705); Charleston, IL
January 13, 2024; 1:00 p.m., ESPN+		Western Illinois	W 72–63	6–12 (3–2)	Groniger Arena (727); Charleston, IL
January 20, 2024; 1:00 p.m., ESPN+		at Lindenwood	W 68–60	7–12 (4–2)	Hyland Performance Arena (621); St. Charles, MO
January 25, 2024; 5:00 p.m., ESPN+		Tennessee Tech	W 73–71	8–12 (5–2)	Groniger Arena (735); Charleston, IL
January 27, 2024; 1:00 p.m., ESPN+		Tennessee State	W 71–67 ^{OT}	9–12 (6–2)	Groniger Arena (841); Charleston, IL
February 1, 2024; 5:00 p.m., ESPN+		UT Martin	L 65–80	9–13 (6–3)	Groniger Arena (568); Charleston, IL
February 3, 2024; 1:00 p.m., ESPN+		Little Rock	L 48–55	9–14 (6–4)	Groniger Arena (588); Charleston, IL
February 8, 2024; 5:00 p.m., ESPN+		at Southern Indiana	L 60–70	9–15 (6–5)	Screaming Eagles Arena (803); Evansville, IN
February 10, 2024; 12:00 p.m., ESPN+		at Morehead State	W 105–103 ^{4OT}	10–15 (7–5)	Ellis Johnson Arena (1,158); Morehead, KY
February 15, 2024; 5:00 p.m., ESPN+		Southeast Missouri State	W 71–52	11–15 (8–5)	Groniger Arena (864); Charleston, IL
February 17, 2024; 1:00 p.m., ESPN+		Lindenwood	W 68–62	12–15 (9–5)	Groniger Arena (913); Charleston, IL
February 22, 2024; 5:00 p.m., ESPN+		at Tennessee State	W 66–56	13–15 (10–5)	Gentry Complex (443); Nashville, TN
February 24, 2024; 1:00 p.m., ESPN+		at Tennessee Tech	L 73–75	13–16 (10–6)	Eblen Center (1,278); Cookeville, TN
February 27, 2024; 5:00 p.m., ESPN+		SIU Edwardsville	W 80–66	14–16 (11–6)	Groniger Arena (1,056); Charleston, IL
February 29, 2024; 5:00 p.m., ESPN+		at Western Illinois	L 54–64	14–17 (11–7)	Western Hall (811); Macomb, IL
Ohio Valley tournament
March 7, 2024; 1:00 p.m., ESPN+	(4)	vs. (8) Tennessee State; Quarterfinals	W 60–48	15–17	Ford Center (–); Evansville, IN
March 8, 2024; 1:00 p.m., ESPN+	(4)	vs. (1) Southern Indiana; Semifinals	L 54–69	15–18	Ford Center (–); Evansville, IN
*Non-conference game. ^{#}Rankings from AP poll. (#) Tournament seedings in parentheses. All times are in Central.
