= 2023–24 Morehead State Eagles women's basketball team =

American college basketball season

2023–24 Morehead State Eagles women's basketball
- Conference: Ohio Valley Conference
- Record: 15–15 (10–8 OVC)
- Head coach: Cayla Petree (3rd season)
- Assistant coaches: Jim Turgeon; Vladimir Shtam; Chynna Bozeman
- Home arena: Ellis Johnson Arena

2023–24 Ohio Valley Conference women's basketball standings
	Conf.				Overall
Team	W		L	PCT	W		L	PCT
Southern Indiana* †	17	–	1	.944	25	–	7	.781
Little Rock	11	–	7	.611	12	–	18	.400
UT Martin	11	–	7	.611	16	–	17	.485
Eastern Illinois	11	–	7	.611	15	–	18	.455
Morehead State	10	–	8	.556	15	–	15	.500
Tennessee Tech	10	–	8	.556	16	–	15	.516
Western Illinois	9	–	9	.500	18	–	12	.600
Tennessee State	7	–	11	.389	11	–	19	.367
Southeast Missouri State	6	–	12	.333	9	–	20	.310
Lindenwood*	5	–	13	.278	7	–	21	.250
SIU Edwardsville	2	–	16	.111	5	–	26	.161
† 2024 OVC tournament winner * ineligible for the 2024 NCAA tournament due to transition period

The 2023–24 Morehead State Eagles women's basketball team represented Morehead State University during the 2023–24 NCAA Division I women's basketball season. The Eagles, who were led by third-year head coach Cayla Petree, played their home games at Ellis Johnson Arena in Morehead, Kentucky as members of the Ohio Valley Conference (OVC). They finished the season 15–15, 10–8 in OVC play, to finish in a tie for fifth place.

== Previous season ==
The Eagles finished the 2022–23 season 11–20, 6–12 in OVC play, to finish in a tie for eighth place. They upset UT Martin in the first round of the OVC tournament, before falling to Southeast Missouri State in the quarterfinals.

== Roster ==
2023–24 Morehead State Eagles women's basketball team
Players
Coaches

Pos.	#	Name	Height	Year	Previous school	Hometown
G	0	Veronica Charles	5 ft 4 in (1.63 m)	Sr	Stony Brook	Otukpo, Nigeria
G	3	Paris McBride	5 ft 6 in (1.68 m)	RS Jr	North Carolina Central	Richmond, VA
G	5	Matilda Soderlund	5 ft 6 in (1.68 m)	Jr	South Plains College	Stockholm, Sweden
G	10	Skylar Barnes	5 ft 9 in (1.75 m)	Jr	Blinn College	Lancaster, TX
F	11	Jayden Rhodes	5 ft 11 in (1.8 m)	So	L. D. Bell High School	Keller, TX
G	12	Alyssa Berry	5 ft 7 in (1.7 m)	So	Hill College	Pearland, TX
F	14	Michelle Ugwah	6 ft 1 in (1.85 m)	Fr	DME Academy	Cork, Ireland
G	20	Melissa Secchiaroli	5 ft 10 in (1.78 m)	Jr	Wichita State	Sorgues, France
G	22	Hallie Rhodes	5 ft 11 in (1.8 m)	So	L. D. Bell High School	Keller, TX
G	23	Blessing King	5 ft 10 in (1.78 m)	So	Florida SouthWestern State	Columbus, OH
F	24	Hannah Hicks	6 ft 1 in (1.85 m)	Jr	Jamestown Community College	Cleveland, OH
F	32	Mikaela Hall	6 ft 1 in (1.85 m)	Jr	Barton Community College	Lawton, OK
G	33	Katie Novik	5 ft 9 in (1.75 m)	Fr	N/A	Grodno, Belarus
G	35	Marie Perdew	5 ft 9 in (1.75 m)	RS Fr	South Carolina State	Short Gap, WV

Head coach

- Cayla Petree (Texas Tech)

Assistant coach(es)

- Jim Turgeon (Washburn)
- Vladimir Shtam (Lesgraft National State)
- Chynna Bozeman (Morehead State)

Legend

- (C) Team captain
- (S) Suspended
- (I) Ineligible
- (W) Walk-on
- Injured
- Current redshirt

Roster
Last update: March 14, 2024

== Schedule and results ==
Date time, TV	Rank^{#}	Opponent^{#}	Result	Record	Site (attendance) city, state
Non-conference regular season
November 7, 2023*; 7:00 p.m., B1G+		at No. 23 Illinois	L 61–81	0–1	State Farm Center (2,680); Champaign, IL
November 9, 2023*; 6:00 p.m., ESPN+		Wilberforce	Canceled		Ellis Johnson Arena; Morehead, KY
November 12, 2023*; 3:00 p.m., SECN+		at Alabama	L 44–85	0–2	Coleman Coliseum (2,033); Tuscaloosa, AL
November 14, 2023*; 7:00 p.m., ESPN+		at Lipscomb	L 73–77	0–3	Allen Arena (123); Nashville, TN
November 18, 2023*; 2:00 p.m., ESPN+		Midway	W 103–51	1–3	Ellis Johnson Arena (625); Morehead, KY
November 22, 2023*; 1:00 p.m., ESPN+		Ohio	W 89–60	2–3	Ellis Johnson Arena (621); Morehead, KY
November 25, 2023*; 2:00 p.m., ESPN+		at Presbyterian	L 59–65	2–4	Templeton Physical Education Center (237); Clinton, SC
November 30, 2023*; 6:00 p.m., ESPN+		Marshall	W 67–64	3–4	Ellis Johnson Arena (585); Morehead, KY
December 3, 2023*; 2:00 p.m., ESPN+		East Tennessee State	L 52–56	3–5	Ellis Johnson Arena (1,050); Morehead, KY
December 11, 2023*; 11:00 a.m., ESPN+		Wheeling	W 53–49	4–5	Ellis Johnson Arena (1,000); Morehead, KY
December 13, 2023*; 4:00 p.m., ACCNX		at No. 18 Louisville	L 48–74	4–6	KFC Yum! Center (7,086); Louisville, KY
December 18, 2023*; 2:00 p.m., ESPN+		Davis & Elkins	W 83–28	5–6	Ellis Johnson Arena (465); Morehead, KY
Ohio Valley regular season
December 31, 2023; 2:00 p.m., ESPN+		at Southeast Missouri State	W 64–61	6–6 (1–0)	Show Me Center (647); Cape Girardeau, MO
January 4, 2024; 5:00 p.m., ESPN+		Tennessee Tech	L 56–79	6–7 (1–1)	Ellis Johnson Arena (748); Morehead, KY
January 6, 2024; 1:00 p.m., ESPN+		Tennessee State	W 86–78	7–7 (2–1)	Ellis Johnson Arena (1,050); Morehead, KY
January 11, 2024; 6:00 p.m., ESPN+		at Eastern Illinois	W 69–67	8–7 (3–1)	Groniger Arena (705); Charleston, IL
January 13, 2024; 3:00 p.m., ESPN+		at SIU Edwardsville	W 77–64	9–7 (4–1)	First Community Arena (513); Edwardsville, IL
January 18, 2024; 5:00 p.m., ESPN+		UT Martin	W 56–38	10–7 (5–1)	Ellis Johnson Arena (475); Morehead, KY
January 20, 2024; 2:00 p.m., ESPN+		at Southern Indiana	L 55–70	10–8 (5–2)	Screaming Eagles Arena (1,057); Evansville, IN
January 27, 2024; 1:00 p.m., ESPN+		Western Illinois	L 59–65	10–9 (5–3)	Ellis Johnson Arena (845); Morehead, KY
February 1, 2024; 12:00 p.m., ESPN+		at Tennessee State	L 58–71	10–10 (5–4)	Gentry Complex (527); Nashville, TN
February 3, 2024; 2:00 p.m., ESPN+		at Tennessee Tech	W 65–53	11–10 (6–4)	Eblen Center (859); Cookeville, TN
February 8, 2024; 6:00 p.m., ESPN+		SIU Edwardsville	W 69–66	12–10 (7–4)	Ellis Johnson Arena (1,010); Morehead, KY
February 10, 2024; 1:00 p.m., ESPN+		Eastern Illinois	L 103–105 ^{4OT}	12–11 (7–5)	Ellis Johnson Arena (1,158); Morehead, KY
February 15, 2024; 6:00 p.m., ESPN+		at Little Rock	W 50–47	13–11 (8–5)	Jack Stephens Center (473); Little Rock, AR
February 17, 2024; 2:00 p.m., ESPN+		at UT Martin	L 54–70	13–12 (8–6)	Skyhawk Arena (1,194); Martin, TN
February 20, 2024; 5:00 p.m., ESPN+		Southern Indiana	L 64–72	13–13 (8–7)	Ellis Johnson Arena (1,080); Morehead, KY
February 22, 2024; 6:00 p.m., ESPN+		at Western Illinois	W 87–85 ^{2OT}	14–13 (9–7)	Western Hall (550); Macomb, IL
February 29, 2024; 5:00 p.m., ESPN+		Southeast Missouri State	L 63–70	14–14 (9–8)	Ellis Johnson Arena (925); Morehead, KY
March 2, 2024; 1:00 p.m., ESPN+		Lindenwood	W 72–59	15–14 (10–8)	Ellis Johnson Arena (880); Morehead, KY
Ohio Valley tournament
March 8, 2024; 2:00 p.m., ESPN+	(5)	vs. (8) Tennessee State; First round	L 50–58	15–15	Ford Center (–); Evansville, IN
*Non-conference game. ^{#}Rankings from AP poll. (#) Tournament seedings in parentheses. All times are in Eastern.
