= 2023–24 Tennessee Tech Golden Eagles women's basketball team =

American college basketball season

2023–24 Tennessee Tech Golden Eagles women's basketball
- Conference: Ohio Valley Conference
- Record: 16–15 (10–8 OVC)
- Head coach: Kim Rosamond (8th season)
- Associate head coach: Melanie Walls
- Assistant coaches: Allison Clark; Jasmine Cincore
- Home arena: Eblen Center

2023–24 Ohio Valley Conference women's basketball standings
	Conf.				Overall
Team	W		L	PCT	W		L	PCT
Southern Indiana* †	17	–	1	.944	25	–	7	.781
Little Rock	11	–	7	.611	12	–	18	.400
UT Martin	11	–	7	.611	16	–	17	.485
Eastern Illinois	11	–	7	.611	15	–	18	.455
Morehead State	10	–	8	.556	15	–	15	.500
Tennessee Tech	10	–	8	.556	16	–	15	.516
Western Illinois	9	–	9	.500	18	–	12	.600
Tennessee State	7	–	11	.389	11	–	19	.367
Southeast Missouri State	6	–	12	.333	9	–	20	.310
Lindenwood*	5	–	13	.278	7	–	21	.250
SIU Edwardsville	2	–	16	.111	5	–	26	.161
† 2024 OVC tournament winner * ineligible for the 2024 NCAA tournament due to transition period

The 2023–24 Tennessee Tech Golden Eagles women's basketball team represented Tennessee Technological University during the 2023–24 NCAA Division I women's basketball season. The Golden Eagles, led by eighth-year head coach Kim Rosamond, played their home games at the Eblen Center located in Cookeville, Tennessee as members of the Ohio Valley Conference.

== Previous season ==
The Golden Eagles finished the 2022–23 season 22–10, 13–5 in OVC play to finish in third place. They defeated SIU Edwardsville in the quarterfinals of the OVC tournament, and Eastern Illinois in the semifinals, before defeating top-seeded Little Rock in the championship game, earning the OVC's automatic bid into the NCAA tournament. They received the #16 seed in the Greenville Regional 2, where they defeated Monmouth in the First Four, before falling to the region's top seed, Indiana, in the first round.

== Roster ==
2023–24 Tennessee Tech Golden Eagles women's basketball team
Players
Coaches

Pos.	#	Name	Height	Year	Previous school	Hometown
G	1	Cayla Cowart	5 ft 9 in (1.75 m)	So	West Forsyth High School	Gainesville, Georgia
G	2	Jennifer Sullivan	5 ft 8 in (1.73 m)	So	Bearden High School	Knoxville, Tennessee
G	3	Maddie Kellione	5 ft 6 in (1.68 m)	GS	Transylvania	Cynthiana, Kentucky
F	4	Anna Walker	6 ft 0 in (1.83 m)	Sr	Chattanooga	Cleveland, Tennessee
F	5	Yaubryon Chambers	6 ft 1 in (1.85 m)	GS	Vanderbilt	Murfreesboro, Tennessee
G	10	Reagan Hurst	5 ft 10 in (1.78 m)	So	Upperman High School	Baxter, Tennessee
G	11	Maaliya Owens	5 ft 9 in (1.75 m)	GS	Scott County High School	Georgetown, Kentucky
G	14	Harley Paynter	5 ft 8 in (1.73 m)	RS So	Boyd County High School	Grayson, Kentucky
G	22	Peyton Carter	5 ft 8 in (1.73 m)	Sr	Abingdon High School	Abingdon, Virginia
F	32	Megan Aulbert	6 ft 2 in (1.88 m)	Fr	Lutheran High School	Lake St. Louis, Missouri
G	33	Reghan Grimes	5 ft 10 in (1.78 m)	So	Ravenwood High School	Nashville, Tennessee
F	42	Kiera Hill	5 ft 11 in (1.8 m)	Sr	Walters State Community College	Trenton, Tennessee

Head coach

- Kim Rosamond (Mississippi)

Assistant coach(es)

- Melanie Walls (Georgia College)
- Allison Clark (Tennessee Tech)
- Jasmine Cincore (Nebraska)

Legend

- (C) Team captain
- (S) Suspended
- (I) Ineligible
- (W) Walk-on
- Injured
- Current redshirt

Roster
Last update: March 14, 2024

== Schedule and results ==
Date time, TV	Rank^{#}	Opponent^{#}	Result	Record	Site (attendance) city, state
Exhibition
October 26, 2023*; 5:30 pm, ESPN+		Christian Brothers	W 89–44	–	Eblen Center (–); Cookeville, TN
Non-conference regular season
November 6, 2023*; 10:00 am, ESPN+		at Ball State	L 64–97	0–1	Worthen Arena (4,212); Muncie, IN
November 15, 2023*; 4:00 pm, ESPN+		Chattanooga	L 45–70	0–2	Eblen Center (2,428); Cookeville, TN
November 18, 2023*; 2:00 pm		at Alabama A&M	L 56–62 ^{OT}	0–3	Alabama A&M Events Center (463); Huntsville, AL
November 24, 2023*; 7:30 pm, FloHoops		vs. Missouri; Daytona Beach Classic	L 65–66	0–4	Ocean Center (250); Daytona Beach, FL
November 25, 2023*; 3:00 pm, FloHoops		vs. Stetson; Daytona Beach Classic	W 65–59	1–4	Ocean Center (200); Daytona Beach, FL
November 29, 2023*; 6:00 pm, ESPN+		Lincoln Memorial	W 84–57	2–4	Eblen Center (799); Cookeville, TN
December 3, 2023*; 12:00 pm, SECN+		at Kentucky	L 67–73	2–5	Clive M. Beck Center (743); Lexington, KY
December 10, 2023*; 1:00 pm, ESPN+		Middle Tennessee	L 47–63	2–6	Eblen Center (1,107); Cookeville, TN
December 14, 2023*; 11:00 am, ESPN+		Tennessee Wesleyan	W 104–43	3–6	Eblen Center (5,887); Cookeville, TN
December 18, 2023*; 6:00 pm, ESPN+		Northern Kentucky	W 77–59	4–6	Eblen Center (696); Cookeville, TN
December 21, 2023*; 6:00 pm, ESPN+		at North Alabama	W 78–67	5–6	CB&S Bank Arena (1,187); Florence, AL
Ohio Valley regular season
December 28, 2023; 5:30 pm, ESPN+		Little Rock	L 57–59	5–7 (0–1)	Eblen Center (1,013); Cookeville, TN
December 30, 2023; 1:00 pm, ESPN+		UT Martin	L 58–67	5–8 (0–2)	Eblen Center (977); Cookeville, TN
January 4, 2024; 4:00 pm, ESPN+		at Morehead State	W 79–56	6–8 (1–2)	Ellis Johnson Arena (748); Morehead, KY
January 6, 2024; 5:00 pm, ESPN+		at Southern Indiana	L 66–69	6–9 (1–3)	Screaming Eagles Arena (1,369); Evansville, IN
January 13, 2024; 1:00 pm, ESPN+		Southeast Missouri State	W 76–65	7–9 (2–3)	Eblen Center (1,042); Cookeville, TN
January 18, 2024; 5:00 pm, ESPN+		at Tennessee State	W 86–81	8–9 (3–3)	Gentry Complex (262); Nashville, TN
January 25, 2024; 5:00 pm, ESPN+		at Eastern Illinois	L 71–73	8–10 (3–4)	Groniger Arena (735); Charleston, IL
January 27, 2024; 1:00 pm, ESPN+		at SIU Edwardsville	W 67–58	9–10 (4–4)	First Community Arena (689); Edwardsville, IL
February 1, 2024; 5:30 pm, ESPN+		Southern Indiana	L 72–81	9–11 (4–5)	Eblen Center (1,171); Cookeville, TN
February 3, 2024; 1:00 pm, ESPN+		Morehead State	L 53–65	9–12 (4–6)	Eblen Center (859); Cookeville, TN
February 8, 2024; 5:15 pm, ESPN+		at Southeast Missouri State	W 76–66	10–12 (5–6)	Show Me Center (380); Cape Girardeau, MO
February 10, 2024; 1:00 pm, ESPN+		at Lindenwood	W 82–52	11–12 (6–6)	Hyland Performance Arena (904); St. Charles, MO
February 13, 2024; 5:30 pm, ESPN+		Tennessee State	W 80–64	12–12 (7–6)	Eblen Center (990); Cookeville, TN
February 15, 2024; 5:30 pm, ESPN+		Western Illinois	W 77–66	13–12 (8–6)	Eblen Center (910); Cookeville, TN
February 22, 2024; 5:30 pm, ESPN+		SIU Edwardsville	W 86–76	14–12 (9–6)	Eblen Center (920); Cookeville, TN
February 24, 2024; 1:00 pm, ESPN+		Eastern Illinois	W 75–73	15–12 (10–6)	Eblen Center (1,278); Cookeville, TN
February 29, 2024; 5:30 pm, ESPN+		at UT Martin	L 37–67	15–13 (10–7)	Skyhawk Arena (1,669); Martin, TN
March 2, 2024; 1:00 pm, ESPN+		at Little Rock	L 69–72 ^{OT}	15–14 (10–8)	Jack Stephens Center (717); Little Rock, AR
Ohio Valley tournament
March 6, 2024; 3:30 pm, ESPN+	(6)	vs. (7) Western Illinois; First round	W 78–69	16–14	Ford Center (464); Evansville, IN
March 7, 2024; 3:30 pm, ESPN+	(6)	vs. (3) UT Martin; Quarterfinals	L 71–79	16–15	Ford Center (830); Evansville, IN
*Non-conference game. ^{#}Rankings from AP Poll. (#) Tournament seedings in parentheses. All times are in Central.
