= 2023–24 Southern Indiana Screaming Eagles women's basketball team =

American college basketball season

2023–24 Southern Indiana Screaming Eagles women's basketball

Ohio Valley regular-season and tournament champions

WNIT, second round
- Conference: Ohio Valley Conference
- Record: 25–7 (17–1 OVC)
- Head coach: Rick Stein (24th season)
- Associate head coach: Randa Gatling
- Assistant coaches: Emma DeHart; Ashley Johnson
- Home arena: Screaming Eagles Arena

2023–24 Ohio Valley Conference women's basketball standings
	Conf.				Overall
Team	W		L	PCT	W		L	PCT
Southern Indiana* †	17	–	1	.944	25	–	7	.781
Little Rock	11	–	7	.611	12	–	18	.400
UT Martin	11	–	7	.611	16	–	17	.485
Eastern Illinois	11	–	7	.611	15	–	18	.455
Morehead State	10	–	8	.556	15	–	15	.500
Tennessee Tech	10	–	8	.556	16	–	15	.516
Western Illinois	9	–	9	.500	18	–	12	.600
Tennessee State	7	–	11	.389	11	–	19	.367
Southeast Missouri State	6	–	12	.333	9	–	20	.310
Lindenwood*	5	–	13	.278	7	–	21	.250
SIU Edwardsville	2	–	16	.111	5	–	26	.161
† 2024 OVC tournament winner * ineligible for the 2024 NCAA tournament due to transition period

The 2023–24 Southern Indiana Screaming Eagles women's basketball team represented the University of Southern Indiana during the 2023–24 NCAA Division I women's basketball season. The Screaming Eagles, led by 24th-year head coach Rick Stein, played their home games at Screaming Eagles Arena in Evansville, Indiana as members of the Ohio Valley Conference (OVC).

This season marked Southern Indiana's second year of a four-year transition period from Division II to Division I. As a result, the Screaming Eagles were not eligible for the NCAA tournament until the 2026–27 season.

The Screaming Eagles finished the season 25–7, 17–1 in OVC play, to finish as OVC regular-season champions. They defeated Eastern Illinois and UT Martin to win the OVC tournament; however, they were ineligible for the NCAA tournament due to the mandatory wait period from transitioning from Division II. They received an at-large bid to the WNIT, where they defeated UIC in the first round before falling to Wisconsin in the second round.

== Previous season ==
The Screaming Eagles finished the 2022–23 season 12–17, 6–12 in OVC play, to finish in a tie for eighth place. Due to tiebreakers, they failed to qualify for the OVC tournament.

== Roster ==
2023–24 Southern Indiana Screaming Eagles women's basketball team
Players
Coaches

Pos.	#	Name	Height	Year	Previous school	Hometown
G	3	Lexie Green	5 ft 10 in (1.78 m)	Sr	Southport High School	Indianapolis, IN
G	4	Tori Handley	5 ft 10 in (1.78 m)	GS	SIU Edwardsville	Jeffersonville, IN
G	10	Kylee Dennis	5 ft 10 in (1.78 m)	Fr	Sayre School	Lexington, KY
G	11	Ali Saunders	5 ft 10 in (1.78 m)	So	Valparaiso	Depauw, IN
G	20	Vanessa Shafford	5 ft 9 in (1.75 m)	Jr	Linton-Stockton High School	Linton, IN
G	21	Addy Blackwell	5 ft 4 in (1.63 m)	RS Sr	Bloomington High School South	Bloomington, IN
F	22	Meredith Raley	6 ft 0 in (1.83 m)	Sr	Gibson Southern High School	Haubstadt, IN
F/C	25	Madi Webb	6 ft 2 in (1.88 m)	Sr	SIU Edwardsville	Bedford, IN
G	33	Triniti Ralston	5 ft 5 in (1.65 m)	Fr	Sacred Heart Academy	Louisville, KY
G/F	40	Sophia Loden	5 ft 11 in (1.8 m)	Fr	Mascoutah High School	Mascoutah, IL
F	41	Claudia Gallegos	6 ft 2 in (1.88 m)	Jr	Neuqua Valley High School	Naperville, IL
C	44	Lauren Carie	6 ft 2 in (1.88 m)	Jr	Vincennes Rivet High School	Vincennes, IN
F/C	45	Chloe Gannon	6 ft 2 in (1.88 m)	Fr	Coffee County Central High School	Manchester, TN

Head coach

- Rick Stein (Southern Indiana)

Assistant coach(es)

- Randa Gatling (Southern Indiana)
- Emma DeHart (Southern Indiana)
- Ashley Johnson (Southern Indiana)

Legend

- (C) Team captain
- (S) Suspended
- (I) Ineligible
- (W) Walk-on
- Injured
- Current redshirt

Roster
Last update: March 13, 2024

== Schedule and results ==
Date time, TV	Rank^{#}	Opponent^{#}	Result	Record	Site (attendance) city, state
Non-conference regular season
November 6, 2023*; 7:00 p.m., ESPN+		Wright State	W 67–63	1–0	Screaming Eagles Arena (653); Evansville, IN
November 12, 2023*; 1:00 p.m., ESPN+		Oakland City	W 86–38	2–0	Screaming Eagles Arena (713); Evansville, IN
November 16, 2023*; 7:00 p.m., ESPN+		Northern Illinois	W 66–60	3–0	Screaming Eagles Arena (503); Evansville, IN
November 20, 2023*; 7:00 p.m., SECN+		at Missouri	L 62–96	3–1	Mizzou Arena (3,471); Columbia, MO
November 26, 2023*; 1:00 p.m., B1G+		at Purdue	L 57–95	3–2	Mackey Arena (3,683); West Lafayette, IN
December 1, 2023*; 7:00 p.m., ESPN+		Murray State	L 73–93	3–3	Screaming Eagles Arena (907); Evansville, IN
December 6, 2023*; 7:00 p.m., ESPN+		at Saint Louis	L 53–89	3–4	Chaifetz Arena (416); St. Louis, MO
December 9, 2023*; 1:00 p.m., ESPN+		Eastern Michigan	W 72–51	4–4	Screaming Eagles Arena (513); Evansville, IN
December 17, 2023*; 2:00 p.m., ESPN+		Cincinnati	L 56–58	5–4	Screaming Eagles Arena (746); Evansville, IN
December 22, 2023*; 1:00 p.m., ESPN+		Brescia	W 86–37	6–4	Screaming Eagles Arena (403); Evansville, IN
OVC regular season
December 29, 2023; 5:15 p.m., ESPN+		at Southeast Missouri State	W 75–37	6–5 (1–0)	Show Me Center (535); Cape Girardeau, MO
December 31, 2023; 12:00 p.m., ESPN+		at Lindenwood	W 71–68	7–5 (2–0)	Hyland Performance Arena (634); St. Charles, MO
January 4, 2024; 5:00 p.m., ESPN+		Tennessee State	W 78–57	8–5 (3–0)	Screaming Eagles Arena (530); Evansville, IN
January 6, 2024; 5:00 p.m., ESPN+		Tennessee Tech	W 69–66	9–5 (4–0)	Screaming Eagles Arena (1,369); Evansville, IN
January 11, 2024; 5:00 p.m., ESPN+		at SIU Edwardsville	W 87–64	10–5 (5–0)	First Community Arena (617); Edwardsville, IL
January 18, 2024; 5:00 p.m., ESPN+		Little Rock	W 58–48	11–5 (6–0)	Screaming Eagles Arena (669); Evansville, IN
January 20, 2024; 1:00 p.m., ESPN+		Morehead State	W 70–55	12–5 (7–0)	Screaming Eagles Arena (1,057); Evansville, IN
January 25, 2024; 5:00 p.m., ESPN+		Western Illinois	W 81–61	13–5 (8–0)	Screaming Eagles Arena (1,365); Evansville, IN
February 1, 2024; 5:30 p.m., ESPN+		at Tennessee Tech	W 81–72	14–5 (9–0)	Eblen Center (1,171); Cookeville, TN
February 3, 2024; 1:00 p.m., ESPN+		at Tennessee State	L 58–65	14–6 (9–1)	Gentry Complex (433); Nashville, TN
February 8, 2024; 5:00 p.m., ESPN+		Eastern Illinois	W 70–60	15–6 (10–1)	Screaming Eagles Arena (803); Evansville, IN
February 10, 2024; 5:00 p.m., ESPN+		SIU Edwardsville	W 75–58	16–6 (11–1)	Screaming Eagles Arena (2,031); Evansville, IN
February 15, 2024; 5:30 p.m., ESPN+		at UT Martin	W 73–67	17–6 (12–1)	Skyhawk Arena (863); Martin, TN
February 17, 2024; 1:00 p.m., ESPN+		at Little Rock	W 88–51	18–6 (13–1)	Jack Stephens Center (205); Little Rock, AR
February 20, 2024; 4:00 p.m., ESPN+		at Morehead State	W 72–64	19–6 (14–1)	Ellis Johnson Arena (1,080); Morehead, KY
February 24, 2024; 1:00 p.m., ESPN+		at Western Illinois	W 96–89 ^{OT}	20–6 (15–1)	Western Hall (880); Macomb, IL
February 29, 2024; 5:00 p.m., ESPN+		Lindenwood	W 75–38	21–6 (16–1)	Screaming Eagles Arena (915); Evansville, IN
March 2, 2024; 5:00 p.m., ESPN+		Southeast Missouri State	W 70–59	22–6 (17–1)	Screaming Eagles Arena (1,292); Evansville, IN
OVC tournament
March 8, 2024; 1:00 p.m., ESPN+	(1)	vs. (4) Eastern Illinois; Semifinals	W 69–54	23–6	Ford Center (–); Evansville, IN
March 9, 2024; 2:00 p.m., ESPN+	(1)	vs. (3) UT Martin; Championship	W 81–53	24–6	Ford Center (1,715); Evansville, IN
WNIT
March 21, 2024; 7:00 p.m., ESPN+		UIC; First round	W 69–64	25–6	Screaming Eagles Arena (1,731); Evansville, IN
March 25, 2024; 7:00 p.m., ESPN+		Wisconsin; Second round	L 62–67	25–7	Screaming Eagles Arena (3,283); Evansville, IN
*Non-conference game. ^{#}Rankings from AP poll. (#) Tournament seedings in parentheses. All times are in Central.
