= 2023–24 Southeast Missouri State Redhawks women's basketball team =

American college basketball season

2023–24 Southeast Missouri State Redhawks women's basketball
- Conference: Ohio Valley Conference
- Record: 9–20 (6–12 OVC)
- Head coach: Rekha Patterson (9th season)
- Assistant coaches: Mike Geary; Gabby Green; Danielle Sanderlin
- Home arena: Show Me Center

2023–24 Ohio Valley Conference women's basketball standings
| | Conf. | | | | Overall |
| Team | W | | L | PCT | W | | L | PCT |
|---|---|---|---|---|---|---|---|---|
| Southern Indiana* † | 17 | – | 1 | .944 | 25 | – | 7 | .781 |
| Little Rock | 11 | – | 7 | .611 | 12 | – | 18 | .400 |
| UT Martin | 11 | – | 7 | .611 | 16 | – | 17 | .485 |
| Eastern Illinois | 11 | – | 7 | .611 | 15 | – | 18 | .455 |
| Morehead State | 10 | – | 8 | .556 | 15 | – | 15 | .500 |
| Tennessee Tech | 10 | – | 8 | .556 | 16 | – | 15 | .516 |
| Western Illinois | 9 | – | 9 | .500 | 18 | – | 12 | .600 |
| Tennessee State | 7 | – | 11 | .389 | 11 | – | 19 | .367 |
| Southeast Missouri State | 6 | – | 12 | .333 | 9 | – | 20 | .310 |
| Lindenwood* | 5 | – | 13 | .278 | 7 | – | 21 | .250 |
| SIU Edwardsville | 2 | – | 16 | .111 | 5 | – | 26 | .161 |
† 2024 OVC tournament winner * ineligible for the 2024 NCAA tournament due to transition period

The 2023–24 Southeast Missouri State Redhawks women's basketball team represented Southeast Missouri State University during the 2023–24 NCAA Division I women's basketball season. The Redhawks, who were led by ninth-year head coach Rekha Patterson, played their home games at the Show Me Center located in Cape Girardeau, Missouri, as members of the Ohio Valley Conference. They finished the season 9–20, 6–12 in OVC play to finish in ninth place. They failed to qualify for the OVC Tournament.

== Previous season ==
The Redhawks finished the 2022–23 season 16–15, 10–8 in OVC play to finish in fourth place. They defeated Morehead State in the quarterfinals of the OVC tournament, before falling to top-seeded Little Rock in the semifinals.

== Roster ==
2023–24 Southeast Missouri State Redhawks women's basketball team
Players
Coaches

| Pos. | # | Name | Height | Year | Previous school | Hometown |
|---|---|---|---|---|---|---|
| G | 1 | Daejah Richmond | 5 ft 8 in (1.73 m) | Fr | First Assembly Christian School | Cordova, Tennessee |
| G | 2 | Indiya Bowen | 5 ft 9 in (1.75 m) | Fr | Horn Lake High School | Nesbit, Mississippi |
| G | 3 | Chandler Davis | 5 ft 5 in (1.65 m) | Sr | Saint Francis School | Alpharetta, Georgia |
| F | 5 | Julia Sion | 6 ft 2 in (1.88 m) | Sr | North Alabama | Port Arthur, Texas |
| F | 11 | Abbigail Stephens | 5 ft 11 in (1.8 m) | Jr | Purdue Fort Wayne | Uniontown, Ohio |
| G | 21 | Megan Barton | 5 ft 9 in (1.75 m) | Sr | Bradley | Carterville, Illinois |
| G | 22 | Alecia Doyle | 5 ft 8 in (1.73 m) | So | Carterville High School | Herrin, Illinois |
| F | 23 | Amiyah Buchanan | 6 ft 0 in (1.83 m) | Fr | Evansville North High School | Evansville, Indiana |
| G | 24 | Jaliyah Green | 5 ft 10 in (1.78 m) | Jr | Holt High School | Wentzville, Missouri |
| G | 25 | Kiyley Flowers | 5 ft 7 in (1.7 m) | Jr | Grand Canyon | Raymore, Missouri |
| C | 30 | Dee Reed | 6 ft 5 in (1.96 m) | Jr | Briarcrest Christian School | Millington, Tennessee |
| G | 34 | Sophie Bussard | 5 ft 8 in (1.73 m) | RS Sr | Tippecanoe Valley High School | Silver Lake, Indiana |
| F | 44 | Michaela Mayfield | 5 ft 10 in (1.78 m) | Sr | Gurdon High School | Gurdon, Arkansas |

Head coach

- Rekha Patterson (North Carolina A&T)

Assistant coach(es)

- Mike Geary (Aquinas)
- Gabby Green (Loyola Marymount)
- Danielle Sanderlin (Canisius)

Legend

- (C) Team captain
- (S) Suspended
- (I) Ineligible
- (W) Walk-on
- Injured
- Current redshirt

Roster
Last update: March 18, 2024

== Schedule and results ==
| Date time, TV | Rank^{#} | Opponent^{#} | Result | Record | Site (attendance) city, state |
Non-conference regular season
| November 7, 2023*; 6:00 pm, ESPN+ | | at Southern Illinois | L 70–85 | 0–1 | Banterra Center (1,017); Carbondale, IL |
| November 11, 2023*; 2:00 pm, ESPN+ | | Stephens | W 82–60 | 1–1 | Show Me Center (270); Cape Girardeau, MO |
| November 17, 2023*; 7:00 pm, ESPN+ | | at UIC | L 74–87 | 1–2 | Credit Union 1 Arena (1,204); Chicago, IL |
| November 19, 2023*; 2:00 pm, B1G+ | | at Northwestern | L 68–76 | 1–3 | Welsh–Ryan Arena (1,439); Evanston, IL |
| November 22, 2023*; 6:30 pm | | at Missouri State | L 66–74 | 1–4 | Great Southern Bank Arena (1,783); Springfield, MO |
| November 28, 2023*; 11:00 am, ESPN+ | | Harris–Stowe State | W 86–48 | 2–4 | Show Me Center (2,157); Cape Girardeau, MO |
| December 2, 2023*; 2:00 pm, SECN+ | | at Missouri | L 43–88 | 2–5 | Mizzou Arena (4,254); Columbia, MO |
| December 6, 2023*; 6:00 pm, B1G+ | | at Purdue | L 57–83 | 2–6 | Mackey Arena (3,412); West Lafayette, IN |
| December 10, 2023*; 12:00 pm, ESPN+ | | at Indiana State | L 57–65 | 2–7 | Hulman Center (1,216); Terre Haute, IN |
| December 19, 2023*; 6:30 pm, ESPN+ | | Eastern Kentucky | L 48–57 | 2–8 | Show Me Center (510); Cape Girardeau, MO |
| December 21, 2023*; 11:00 am, ESPN+ | | Evansville | W 74–44 | 3–8 | Show Me Center (400); Cape Girardeau, MO |
OVC regular season
| December 29, 2023; 5:15 pm, ESPN+ | | Southern Indiana | L 37–75 | 3–9 (0–1) | Show Me Center (535); Cape Girardeau, MO |
| December 31, 2023; 1:00 pm, ESPN+ | | Morehead State | L 61–64 | 3–10 (0–2) | Show Me Center (647); Cape Girardeau, MO |
| January 4, 2024; 5:00 pm, ESPN+ | | at Western Illinois | W 72–66 | 4–10 (1–2) | Western Hall (570); Macomb, IL |
| January 11, 2024; 5:15 pm, ESPN+ | | Lindenwood | W 80–63 | 5–10 (2–2) | Show Me Center (534); Cape Girardeau, MO |
| January 13, 2024; 1:00 pm, ESPN+ | | at Tennessee Tech | L 65–76 | 5–11 (2–3) | Eblen Center (1,042); Cookeville, TN |
| January 20, 2024; 1:30 pm, ESPN+ | | SIU Edwardsville | W 86–72 | 6–11 (3–3) | Show Me Center (485); Cape Girardeau, MO |
| January 25, 2024; 5:30 pm, ESPN+ | | at UT Martin | L 44–52 | 6–12 (3–4) | Skyhawk Arena (1,483); Martin, TN |
| January 27, 2024; 1:00 pm, ESPN+ | | at Little Rock | L 47–53 | 6–13 (3–5) | Jack Stephens Center (423); Little Rock, AR |
| January 30, 2024; 5:00 pm, ESPN+ | | at Lindenwood | L 53–67 | 6–14 (3–6) | Hyland Performance Arena (789); St. Charles, MO |
| February 3, 2024; 1:30 pm, ESPN+ | | Western Illinois | L 59–70 | 6–15 (3–7) | Show Me Center (415); Cape Girardeau, MO |
| February 8, 2024; 5:15 pm, ESPN+ | | Tennessee Tech | L 66–76 | 6–16 (3–8) | Show Me Center (380); Cape Girardeau, MO |
| February 10, 2024; 1:30 pm, ESPN+ | | Tennessee State | W 48–47 | 7–16 (4–8) | Show Me Center (381); Cape Girardeau, MO |
| February 15, 2024; 5:00 pm, ESPN+ | | at Eastern Illinois | L 52–71 | 7–17 (4–9) | Groniger Arena (864); Charleston, IL |
| February 17, 2024; 1:00 pm, ESPN+ | | at SIU Edwardsville | W 67–57 | 8–17 (5–9) | First Community Arena (719); Edwardsville, IL |
| February 22, 2024; 4:00 pm, ESPNU | | Little Rock | L 48–61 | 8–18 (5–10) | Show Me Center (625); Cape Girardeau, MO |
| February 24, 2024; 1:30 pm, ESPN+ | | UT Martin | L 61–64 | 8–19 (5–11) | Show Me Center (565); Cape Girardeau, MO |
| February 29, 2024; 4:00 pm, ESPN+ | | at Morehead State | W 70–63 | 9–19 (6–11) | Ellis Johnson Arena (925); Morehead, KY |
| March 2, 2024; 5:00 pm, ESPN+ | | at Southern Indiana | L 59–70 | 9–20 (6–12) | Ellis Johnson Arena (1,292); Morehead, KY |
*Non-conference game. ^{#}Rankings from AP Poll. (#) Tournament seedings in parentheses. All times are in Central.
