= 2024 Ohio Valley Conference women's basketball tournament =

- Classification: Division I
- Season: 2023–24
- Teams: 8
- Site: Ford Center; Evansville, Indiana
- Champions: Southern Indiana (1st title)
- Winning coach: Rick Stein (1st title)
- MVP: Meredith Raley (Southern Indiana)
- Television: ESPN+

2023–24 Ohio Valley Conference women's basketball standings
| | Conf. | | | | Overall |
| Team | W | | L | PCT | W | | L | PCT |
|---|---|---|---|---|---|---|---|---|
| Southern Indiana* † | 17 | – | 1 | .944 | 25 | – | 7 | .781 |
| Little Rock | 11 | – | 7 | .611 | 12 | – | 18 | .400 |
| UT Martin | 11 | – | 7 | .611 | 16 | – | 17 | .485 |
| Eastern Illinois | 11 | – | 7 | .611 | 15 | – | 18 | .455 |
| Morehead State | 10 | – | 8 | .556 | 15 | – | 15 | .500 |
| Tennessee Tech | 10 | – | 8 | .556 | 16 | – | 15 | .516 |
| Western Illinois | 9 | – | 9 | .500 | 18 | – | 12 | .600 |
| Tennessee State | 7 | – | 11 | .389 | 11 | – | 19 | .367 |
| Southeast Missouri State | 6 | – | 12 | .333 | 9 | – | 20 | .310 |
| Lindenwood* | 5 | – | 13 | .278 | 7 | – | 21 | .250 |
| SIU Edwardsville | 2 | – | 16 | .111 | 5 | – | 26 | .161 |
† 2024 OVC tournament winner * ineligible for the 2024 NCAA tournament due to transition period

The 2024 Ohio Valley Conference Women's Basketball Tournament was the final event of the 2023–24 NCAA Division I women's basketball season in the Ohio Valley Conference. The tournament was held March 6–9, 2024 at the Ford Center in Evansville, Indiana. Southern Indiana, a team ineligible for the NCAA Tournament due to being in the second year of a four-year transition from NCAA Division II, won the OVC tournament. The conference's automatic bid to the 2024 NCAA Division I women's basketball tournament instead went to Southern Indiana's defeated opponent in the OVC final, UT Martin.

== Seeds ==
Only the top eight teams in the conference qualified for the tournament. Teams were seeded by record within the conference, with a tiebreaker system to seed teams with identical conference records.

If a team that is not eligible for the NCAA Tournament wins the Ohio Valley Conference Tournament, the conference's automatic bid goes to the tournament runner-up. If that team is also not eligible, i.e. two ineligible teams met in the tournament final, the automatic bid goes to the highest seeded tournament-eligible team.

As Southern Indiana was ineligible for the tournament due to its transition, UT Martin will represent the conference.

| Seed | School | Conference | Tiebreaker |
|---|---|---|---|
| 1 | Southern Indiana | 17–1 | |
| 2 | Little Rock | 11–7 | 3–1 vs. UT Martin/Eastern Illinois |
| 3 | UT Martin | 11–7 | 2–2 vs. Little Rock/Eastern Illinois |
| 4 | Eastern Illinois | 11-7 | 1–3 vs. Little Rock/UT Martin |
| 5 | Morehead State | 10–8 | 1–0 vs. Little Rock |
| 6 | Tennessee Tech | 10–8 | 0–2 vs. Little Rock |
| 7 | Western Illinois | 9–9 | |
| 8 | Tennessee State | 7–11 | |
| DNQ | Southeast Missouri State | 6–12 | |
| DNQ | Lindenwood | 5–13 | |
| DNQ | SIU Edwardsville | 2–16 | |

== Schedule ==
| Game | Time | Matchup | Score | Television |
First Round – Wednesday, March 6
| 1 | 1:00 pm | No. 5 Morehead State vs. No. 8 Tennessee State | 50–58 | ESPN+ |
| 2 | 3:30 pm | No. 6 Tennessee Tech vs. No. 7 Western Illinois | 78–69 | ESPN+ |
Quarterfinals – Thursday, March 7
| 3 | 1:00 pm | No. 4 Eastern Illinois vs. No. 8 Tennessee State | 60–48 | ESPN+ |
| 4 | 3:30 pm | No. 3 UT Martin vs. No. 6 Tennessee Tech | 79–71 | ESPN+ |
Semifinals – Friday, March 8
| 5 | 1:00 pm | No. 1 Southern Indiana vs. No. 4 Eastern Illinois | 69–54 | ESPN+ |
| 6 | 3:30 pm | No. 2 Little Rock vs. No. 3 UT Martin | 48–54 | ESPN+ |
Championship – Saturday, March 9
| 7 | 2:00 pm | No. 1 Southern Indiana vs. No. 3 UT Martin | 83–51 | ESPN+ |
All game times in Central Time.

== Bracket ==
First Round; Wednesday, March 6
5 | Morehead State | 50
8 | Tennessee State | 58
6 | Tennessee Tech | 78
7 | Western Illinois | 69

Quarterfinals; Thursday, March 7
4 | Eastern Illinois | 60
8 | Tennessee State | 48
3 | UT Martin | 79
6 | Tennessee Tech | 71

Semifinals; Friday, March 8
1 | Southern Indiana | 69
4 | Eastern Illinois | 54
2 | Little Rock | 48
3 | UT Martin | 54

Championship; Saturday, March 9
1 | Southern Indiana | 83
3 | UT Martin | 51
