= 2023–24 Lindenwood Lions women's basketball team =

American college basketball season

2023–24 Lindenwood Lions women's basketball
- Conference: Ohio Valley Conference
- Record: 7–21 (5–13 OVC)
- Head coach: Amy Eagan (1st season)
- Associate head coach: Jordan Mellott
- Assistant coaches: Alexis Hyder; Taylor Birch
- Home arena: Hyland Performance Arena

2023–24 Ohio Valley Conference women's basketball standings
	Conf.				Overall
Team	W		L	PCT	W		L	PCT
Southern Indiana* †	17	–	1	.944	25	–	7	.781
Little Rock	11	–	7	.611	12	–	18	.400
UT Martin	11	–	7	.611	16	–	17	.485
Eastern Illinois	11	–	7	.611	15	–	18	.455
Morehead State	10	–	8	.556	15	–	15	.500
Tennessee Tech	10	–	8	.556	16	–	15	.516
Western Illinois	9	–	9	.500	18	–	12	.600
Tennessee State	7	–	11	.389	11	–	19	.367
Southeast Missouri State	6	–	12	.333	9	–	20	.310
Lindenwood*	5	–	13	.278	7	–	21	.250
SIU Edwardsville	2	–	16	.111	5	–	26	.161
† 2024 OVC tournament winner * ineligible for the 2024 NCAA tournament due to transition period

The 2023–24 Lindenwood Lions women's basketball team represented Lindenwood University during the 2023–24 NCAA Division I women's basketball season. The Lions, who were led by first-year head coach Amy Eagan, played their home games at the Hyland Performance Arena in St. Charles, Missouri as members of the Ohio Valley Conference (OVC). They finished the season 7–21, 5–13 in OVC play, to finish in tenth place. They failed to qualify for the OVC tournament.

== Previous season ==
The Lions finished the 2022–23 season 2–24, 1–17 in OVC play, to finish in last place. They failed to qualify for the OVC tournament. On March 16, 2023, the school announced the firing of head coach Katie Falco, ending her five-year tenure. On March 28, Drury head coach Amy Eagan was named as Falco's successor.

== Roster ==
2023–24 Lindenwood Lions women's basketball team
Players
Coaches

Pos.	#	Name	Height	Year	Previous school	Hometown
G	1	Stevi Lockhart	5 ft 11 in (1.8 m)	Fr	Sudan High School	Sudan, TX
G	2	Makayla Wallace	5 ft 4 in (1.63 m)	GS	North Dakota	St. Louis, MO
G	3	Jannaeleigh Cooper	5 ft 11 in (1.8 m)	Fr	Coronado High School	Lubbock, TX
G	4	Ellie Brueggemann	5 ft 11 in (1.8 m)	Fr	Lincoln Christian School	Owasso, OK
G	5	Aalayah Wilson	5 ft 8 in (1.73 m)	Fr	Osseo Senior High School	Maple Grove, MN
F	15	Alyssa Nielsen	6 ft 0 in (1.83 m)	Fr	Bixby High School	Bixby, OK
G	21	Mary McGrath	6 ft 1 in (1.85 m)	Jr	John Hersey High School	Arlington Heights, IL
F	22	Mya Skoff	5 ft 9 in (1.75 m)	Fr	Bellevue East High School	Bellevue, NE
G	23	Kaylen Evans	5 ft 6 in (1.68 m)	Jr	Morton College	New Lenox, IL
G	24	Mykayla Cunningham	5 ft 10 in (1.78 m)	Fr	Spire Academy	Salina, KS
F	25	Celina Arnlund	6 ft 0 in (1.83 m)	Jr	Casper College	Stockholm, Sweden
F	33	Gracie Kelsey	6 ft 2 in (1.88 m)	Fr	East Buchanan High School	Agency, MO
C	35	Justis Odom	6 ft 2 in (1.88 m)	Jr	Texas A&M–Corpus Christi	Indianapolis, IN
F	40	Kaliyah Sain	6 ft 0 in (1.83 m)	Fr	John F. Kennedy High School	Cedar Rapids, IA

Head coach

- Amy Eagan (Truman State)

Assistant coach(es)

- Jordan Mellott (Benedictine (KS))
- Alexis Hyder (LSU)
- Taylor Birch (Drury)

Legend

- (C) Team captain
- (S) Suspended
- (I) Ineligible
- (W) Walk-on
- Injured
- Current redshirt

Roster
Last update: March 19, 2024

== Schedule and results ==
Date time, TV	Rank^{#}	Opponent^{#}	Result	Record	Site (attendance) city, state
Non-conference regular season
November 6, 2023*; 6:00 p.m., ESPN+		Tulsa	L 80–89	0–1	Hyland Performance Arena (372); St. Charles, MO
November 12, 2023*; 11:00 a.m., ESPN+		at Dayton	L 73–91	0–2	UD Arena (1,762); Dayton, OH
November 15, 2023*; 10:00 a.m., ESPN+		at Cincinnati	L 62–81	0–3	Fifth Third Arena (4,673); Cincinnati, OH
November 21, 2023*; 6:00 p.m., ESPN+		at Northern Illinois	L 60–77	0–4	Convocation Center (486); DeKalb, IL
November 29, 2023*; 6:00 p.m., ESPN+		Central Arkansas	L 64–77	0–5	Hyland Performance Arena (423); St. Charles, MO
December 2, 2023*; 7:00 p.m., ESPN+		at Bradley	L 56–63	0–6	Renaissance Coliseum (422); Peoria, IL
December 7, 2023*; 6:00 p.m., ESPN+		Eastern Michigan	W 71–64	1–6	Hyland Performance Arena (317); St. Charles, MO
December 11, 2023*; 11:00 a.m., ESPN+		Harris–Stowe State	W 99–54	2–6	Hyland Performance Arena (893); St. Charles, MO
December 16, 2023*; 2:00 p.m., ESPN+		at Evansville	L 68–70	2–7	Meeks Family Fieldhouse (369); Evansville, IN
December 21, 2023*; 3:00 p.m., ESPN+		at Minnesota	L 45–100	2–8	Williams Arena (3,069); Minneapolis, MN
OVC regular season
December 31, 2023; 12:00 p.m., ESPN+		Southern Indiana	L 68–71	2–9 (0–1)	Hyland Performance Arena (634); St. Charles, MO
January 6, 2024; 1:00 p.m., ESPN+		at Western Illinois	L 58–74	2–10 (0–2)	Western Hall (581); Macomb, IL
January 11, 2024; 5:15 p.m., ESPN+		at Southeast Missouri State	L 63–80	2–11 (0–3)	Show Me Center (534); Cape Girardeau, MO
January 13, 2024; 1:00 p.m., ESPN+		at Tennessee State	L 80–83	2–12 (0–4)	Gentry Complex (–); Nashville, TN
January 18, 2024; 5:00 p.m., ESPN+		SIU Edwardsville	W 79–73	3–12 (1–4)	Hyland Performance Arena (789); St. Charles, MO
January 20, 2024; 1:00 p.m., ESPN+		Eastern Illinois	L 60–68	3–13 (1–5)	Hyland Performance Arena (621); St. Charles, MO
January 25, 2024; 11:30 a.m., ESPN+		at Little Rock	L 45–50	3–14 (1–6)	Jack Stephens Center (–); Little Rock, AR
January 27, 2024; 1:00 p.m., ESPN+		at UT Martin	W 73–68	4–14 (2–6)	Skyhawk Arena (895); Martin, TN
January 30, 2024; 5:00 p.m., ESPN+		Southeast Missouri State	W 67–53	5–14 (3–6)	Hyland Performance Arena (789); St. Charles, MO
February 1, 2024; 5:00 p.m., ESPN+		Western Illinois	L 68–75	5–15 (3–7)	Hyland Performance Arena (407); St. Charles, MO
February 8, 2024; 5:00 p.m., ESPN+		Tennessee State	W 81–73 ^{2OT}	6–15 (4–7)	Hyland Performance Arena (903); St. Charles, MO
February 10, 2024; 1:00 p.m., ESPN+		Tennessee Tech	L 52–82	6–16 (4–8)	Hyland Performance Arena (904); St. Charles, MO
February 15, 2024; 5:00 p.m., ESPN+		at SIU Edwardsville	L 67–69	6–17 (4–9)	First Community Arena (762); Edwardsville, IL
February 17, 2024; 1:00 p.m., ESPN+		at Eastern Illinois	L 62–68	6–18 (4–10)	Groniger Arena (913); Charleston, IL
February 22, 2024; 5:00 p.m., ESPN+		UT Martin	L 56–65	6–19 (4–11)	Hyland Performance Arena (719); St. Charles, MO
February 24, 2024; 1:00 p.m., ESPN+		Little Rock	W 61–54	7–19 (5–11)	Hyland Performance Arena (737); St. Charles, MO
February 29, 2024; 5:00 p.m., ESPN+		at Southern Indiana	L 38–75	7–20 (5–12)	Screaming Eagles Arena (915); Evansville, IN
March 2, 2024; 12:00 p.m., ESPN+		at Morehead State	L 59–72	7–21 (5–13)	Ellis Johnson Arena (880); Morehead, KY
*Non-conference game. ^{#}Rankings from AP poll. (#) Tournament seedings in parentheses. All times are in Central.
