= 2023–24 Western Illinois Leathernecks women's basketball team =

American college basketball season

2023–24 Western Illinois Leathernecks women's basketball
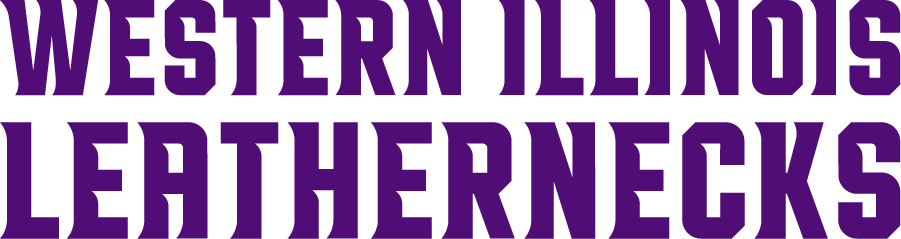
- Conference: Ohio Valley Conference
- Record: 18–12 (9–9 OVC)
- Head coach: JD Gravina (13th season)
- Associate head coach: Dan Chapla
- Assistant coaches: Alexa Tovella; Olivia Travis
- Home arena: Western Hall

2023–24 Ohio Valley Conference women's basketball standings
	Conf.				Overall
Team	W		L	PCT	W		L	PCT
Southern Indiana* †	17	–	1	.944	25	–	7	.781
Little Rock	11	–	7	.611	12	–	18	.400
UT Martin	11	–	7	.611	16	–	17	.485
Eastern Illinois	11	–	7	.611	15	–	18	.455
Morehead State	10	–	8	.556	15	–	15	.500
Tennessee Tech	10	–	8	.556	16	–	15	.516
Western Illinois	9	–	9	.500	18	–	12	.600
Tennessee State	7	–	11	.389	11	–	19	.367
Southeast Missouri State	6	–	12	.333	9	–	20	.310
Lindenwood*	5	–	13	.278	7	–	21	.250
SIU Edwardsville	2	–	16	.111	5	–	26	.161
† 2024 OVC tournament winner * ineligible for the 2024 NCAA tournament due to transition period

The 2023–24 Western Illinois Leathernecks women's basketball team represented Western Illinois University during the 2023–24 NCAA Division I women's basketball season. The Leathernecks, who were led by 13th-year head coach JD Gravina, played their home games at Western Hall in Macomb, Illinois, as first-year members of the Ohio Valley Conference.

== Previous season ==
The Leathernecks finished the 2022–23 season 10–20, 5–13 in Summit League play to finish in ninth place. They were defeated by St. Thomas in the first round of the Summit League tournament. This was the Leathernecks' final season as a member of the Summit League, as they moved to the Ohio Valley Conference for the 2023–24 season.

== Roster ==
2023–24 Western Illinois Leathernecks women's basketball team
Players
Coaches

Pos.	#	Name	Height	Year	Previous school	Hometown
G	0	Carla Flores	5 ft 9 in (1.75 m)	GS	Mare de deu de la Salut	Barcelona, Spain
G	1	Lily Randgaard	5 ft 11 in (1.8 m)	So	Kettle Moraine High School	Oconomowoc, Wisconsin
C	3	Alissa Dins	6 ft 1 in (1.85 m)	GS	Laconia High School	Rosendale, Wisconsin
G	4	Allie Meadows	5 ft 8 in (1.73 m)	So	Central DeWitt High School	DeWitt, Iowa
F	5	Maria Messling	6 ft 0 in (1.83 m)	Fr	Evansville High School	Evansville, Wisconsin
G	10	Mallory McDermott	5 ft 8 in (1.73 m)	Sr	Cedar Rapids Prairie High School	Fairfax, Iowa
G	12	Raegan McCowan	5 ft 11 in (1.8 m)	Fr	Lebanon High School	Lebanon, Missouri
G	13	Addi Brownfield	5 ft 9 in (1.75 m)	So	Boonville High School	Boonville, Missouri
G	14	Ainsley Holthaus	5 ft 4 in (1.63 m)	Fr	Macomb High School	Macomb, Illinois
F	23	Jasmine Nichols	6 ft 1 in (1.85 m)	Jr	Moorpark College	Oxnard, California
F	24	Kennedy Flanagan	6 ft 0 in (1.83 m)	Sr	Highland High School	Canton, Missouri
G	32	Kaylen Reed	5 ft 5 in (1.65 m)	Fr	Rochester High School	Rochester, Illinois
G	33	Anna Deets	5 ft 9 in (1.75 m)	Sr	Mason City High School	Mason City, Iowa

Head coach

- JD Gravina (William Jewell)

Assistant coach(es)

- Dan Chapla (Ottawa)
- Alexa Tovella (Barton)
- Olivia Travis (Oklahoma Christian)

Legend

- (C) Team captain
- (S) Suspended
- (I) Ineligible
- (W) Walk-on
- Injured
- Current redshirt

Roster
Last update: March 15, 2024

== Schedule and results ==
Date time, TV	Rank^{#}	Opponent^{#}	Result	Record	Site (attendance) city, state
Non-conference regular season
November 6, 2023*; 7:00 pm, ESPN+		Mount Mercy	W 81–57	1–0	Western Hall (721); Macomb, IL
November 9, 2023*; 7:00 pm, B1G+		at Wisconsin	L 52–74	1–1	Kohl Center (3,058); Madison, WI
November 12, 2023*; 1:00 pm, ESPN+		Northern Illinois	W 95–62	2–1	Western Hall (677); Macomb, IL
November 15, 2023*; 7:00 pm, ESPN+		Hannibal–LaGrange	W 101–23	3–1	Western Hall (521); Macomb, IL
November 18, 2023*; 1:00 pm, ESPN+		at Valparaiso	W 76–54	4–1	Athletics–Recreation Center (277); Valparaiso, IN
November 20, 2023*; 11:00 am, ESPN+		Stephens	W 80–51	5–1	Western Hall (1,725); Macomb, IL
November 28, 2023*; 7:00 pm, ESPN+		Chicago State	W 86–72	6–1	Western Hall (566); Macomb, IL
December 2, 2023*; 1:00 pm, ESPN+		St. Thomas	W 82–78	7–1	Western Hall (623); Macomb, IL
December 5, 2023*; 7:00 pm, ESPN+		Omaha	W 78–75	8–1	Western Hall (539); Macomb, IL
December 10, 2023*; 2:00 pm, SLN		at Kansas City	L 60–68	8–2	Swinney Recreation Center (561); Kansas City, MO
December 21, 2023*; 7:00 pm, ESPN+		Cornell College	W 116–55	9–2	Western Hall (429); Macomb, IL
Ohio Valley regular season
December 31, 2023; 1:00 pm, ESPN+		at SIU Edwardsville	W 81–75	10–2 (1–0)	First Community Arena (1,021); Edwardsville, IL
January 4, 2024; 5:00 pm, ESPN+		Southeast Missouri State	L 66–72	10–3 (1–1)	Western Hall (570); Macomb, IL
January 6, 2024; 1:00 pm, ESPN+		Lindenwood	W 74–58	11–3 (2–1)	Western Hall (581); Macomb, IL
January 11, 2024; 5:30 pm, ESPN+		at UT Martin	L 49–68	11–4 (2–2)	Skyhawk Arena (1,112); Martin, TN
January 13, 2024; 1:00 pm, ESPN+		at Eastern Illinois	L 63–72	11–5 (2–3)	Groniger Arena (727); Charleston, IL
January 20, 2024; 1:00 pm, ESPN+		Tennessee State	W 79–71 ^{OT}	12–5 (3–3)	Western Hall (861); Macomb, IL
January 25, 2024; 5:00 pm, ESPN+		at Southern Indiana	L 61–81	12–6 (3–4)	Screaming Eagles Arena (1,365); Evansville, IN
January 27, 2024; 12:00 pm, ESPN+		at Morehead State	W 65–59	13–6 (4–4)	Ellis Johnson Arena (845); Morehead, KY
February 1, 2024; 5:00 pm, ESPN+		at Lindenwood	W 75–68	14–6 (5–4)	Hyland Performance Arena (407); St. Charles, MO
February 3, 2024; 1:30 pm, ESPN+		at Southeast Missouri State	W 70–59	15–6 (6–4)	Show Me Center (415); Cape Girardeau, MO
February 8, 2024; 5:00 pm, ESPN+		Little Rock	L 41–50	15–7 (6–5)	Western Hall (796); Macomb, IL
February 10, 2024; 2:00 pm, ESPN+		UT Martin	W 71–61	16–7 (7–5)	Western Hall (786); Macomb, IL
February 15, 2024; 5:30 pm, ESPN+		at Tennessee Tech	L 66–77	16–8 (7–6)	Eblen Center (910); Cookeville, TN
February 17, 2024; 1:00 pm, ESPN+		at Tennessee State	L 71–84	16–9 (7–7)	Gentry Complex (709); Nashville, TN
February 22, 2024; 5:00 pm, ESPN+		Morehead State	L 85–87 ^{2OT}	16–10 (7–8)	Western Hall (550); Macomb, IL
February 24, 2024; 1:00 pm, ESPN+		Southern Indiana	L 89–96 ^{OT}	16–11 (7–9)	Western Hall (880); Macomb, IL
February 29, 2024; 5:00 pm, ESPN+		Eastern Illinois	W 64–54	17–11 (8–9)	Western Hall (811); Macomb, IL
March 2, 2024; 1:00 pm, ESPN+		SIU Edwardsville	W 84–56	18–11 (9–9)	Western Hall (798); Macomb, IL
Ohio Valley tournament
March 6, 2024; 3:30 pm, ESPN+	(7)	vs. (6) Tennessee Tech; First round	L 69–78	18–12	Ford Center (464); Evansville, IN
*Non-conference game. ^{#}Rankings from AP Poll. (#) Tournament seedings in parentheses. All times are in Central.
