= 2022–23 Tennessee Tech Golden Eagles women's basketball team =

American college basketball season

2022–23 Tennessee Tech Golden Eagles women's basketball

OVC tournament champions

NCAA tournament, first round
- Conference: Ohio Valley Conference
- Record: 22–10 (13–5 OVC)
- Head coach: Kim Rosamond (7th season)
- Assistant coaches: Jasmine Cincore; Allison Clark; Melanie Walls
- Home arena: Eblen Center

2022–23 Ohio Valley Conference women's basketball standings
	Conf.				Overall
Team	W		L	PCT	W		L	PCT
Little Rock	17	–	1	.944	21	–	10	.677
Eastern Illinois	14	–	4	.778	21	–	8	.724
Tennessee Tech†	13	–	5	.722	22	–	9	.710
Southeast Missouri State	10	–	8	.556	16	–	15	.516
UT Martin	9	–	9	.500	13	–	17	.433
Tennessee State	7	–	11	.389	11	–	18	.379
SIU Edwardsville	7	–	11	.389	9	–	22	.290
Morehead State	6	–	12	.333	11	–	20	.355
Southern Indiana*	6	–	12	.333	12	–	17	.414
Lindenwood*	1	–	17	.056	2	–	24	.077
† 2023 OVC tournament winner * ineligible for the 2023 NCAA tournament due to transition period As of March 5, 2023

The 2022–23 Tennessee Tech Golden Eagles women's basketball team represented Tennessee Technological University during the 2022–23 NCAA Division I women's basketball season. The Golden Eagles, led by seventh-year head coach Kim Rosamond, played their home games at the Eblen Center in Cookeville, Tennessee as members of the Ohio Valley Conference (OVC).

The Golden Eagles finished third in the OVC regular season, with a record of 13 wins and 5 losses in conference play. As the 3 seed, the team won three games in as many days in the conference tournament, defeating 6 seed SIU Edwardsville and 2 seed Eastern Illinois on their way to the championship game. In the conference championship, the Golden Eagles defeated 1 seed Little Rock to win their tenth conference tournament title and earn a spot in the NCAA tournament.

In the NCAA tournament, Tennessee Tech was rated a 16-seed and played in the First Four games, where they defeated Monmouth. Their next game was against 1 seed Indiana in Bloomington, Indiana, which the Golden Eagles ultimately lost.

== Roster ==
2022–23 Tennessee Tech Golden Eagles women's basketball team
Players
Coaches

Pos.	#	Name	Height	Year	Previous school	Hometown
G	1	Cayla Cowart	5 ft 9 in (1.75 m)	Fr	West Forsyth HS	Gainesville, GA
G	2	Jordan Brock	5 ft 7 in (1.7 m)	GS	Harlan HS	Harlan, KY
G	3	Jennifer Sullivan	5 ft 8 in (1.73 m)	Fr	Bearden HS	Knoxville, TN
F	4	Anna Walker	6 ft 0 in (1.83 m)	Jr	Bradley Central HS; Chattanooga	Cleveland, TN
G	10	Reagan Hurst	5 ft 10 in (1.78 m)	RS Fr	Upperman HS	Bloomington Springs, TN
G	11	Maaliya Owens	5 ft 9 in (1.75 m)	Sr	Scott County HS	Georgetown, KY
G	13	Ansley Hall	5 ft 7 in (1.7 m)	Jr	North Oconee HS	Watkinsville, GA
G	14	Harley Paynter	5 ft 8 in (1.73 m)	So	Boyd County HS	Grayson, KY
G	22	Peyton Carter	5 ft 8 in (1.73 m)	Jr	Abingdon HS	Abingdon, VA
G	24	Jada Guinn	5 ft 8 in (1.73 m)	Sr	Oak Ridge HS	Oak Ridge, TN
G	33	Reghan Grimes	5 ft 10 in (1.78 m)	Fr	Ravenwood HS	Nashville, TN
C	35	DJ McFarlane	6 ft 3 in (1.91 m)	Sr	Trenton HS; Walters State CC	Beltsville, MD
F/C	45	Olivia Koontz	6 ft 3 in (1.91 m)	So	Signal Mountain HS	Signal Mountain, TN

Head coach

- Kim Rosamond (Mississippi)

Assistant coach(es)

- Jasmine Cincore (Nebraska)
- Allison Clark (Tennessee Tech)
- Melanie Walls (Georgia College)

Legend

- (C) Team captain
- (S) Suspended
- (I) Ineligible
- (W) Walk-on
- Injured
- Current redshirt

Roster

== Schedule and results ==
Date time, TV	Rank^{#}	Opponent^{#}	Result	Record	Site (attendance) city, state
Exhibition
October 27, 2022*; 5:30 p.m.		Stephens College	W 66–53		Eblen Center; Cookeville, TN
Non–conference regular season
November 7, 2022*; 6:00 p.m., ESPN+		Ball State	W 68–63	1–0	Eblen Center (966); Cookeville, TN
November 10, 2022*; 4:00 p.m., ESPN+		at Cincinnati	L 57–68	1–1	Fifth Third Arena (612); Cincinnati, OH
November 14, 2022*; 6:00 p.m., ESPN+		Samford	W 75–70	2–1	Eblen Center (782); Cookeville, TN
November 17, 2022*; 5:30 p.m., ESPN+		Trevecca Nazarene	W 69–52	3–1	Eblen Center (984); Cookeville, TN
November 20, 2022*; 1:00 p.m., ESPN+		at Northern Kentucky	L 53–75	3–2	BB&T Arena (1,041); Highland Heights, KY
December 1, 2022*; 11:00 a.m., ESPN+		at Middle Tennessee	L 45–83	3–3	Murphy Center (6,000); Murfreesboro, TN
December 10, 2022*; 1:00 p.m., ESPN+		Alabama A&M	W 78–68	4–3	Eblen Center (775); Cookeville, TN
December 13, 2022*; 11:00 a.m., ESPN+		Tennessee Wesleyan	W 85–52	5–3	Eblen Center (4,287); Cookeville, TN
December 17, 2022*; 4:00 p.m., ESPN+		at Louisiana–Monroe	W 83–59	6–3	Fant–Ewing Coliseum (533); Monroe, LA
December 20, 2022*; 2:30 p.m.		vs. VCU; Tulane Holiday Tournament	Canceled due to COVID-19 protocols		Devlin Fieldhouse; New Orleans, LA
December 21, 2022*; 12:30 p.m., ESPN+		at Tulane; Tulane Holiday Tournament	L 49–71	6–4	Devlin Fieldhouse (615); New Orleans, LA
Ohio Valley Conference regular season
December 29, 2022; 5:00 p.m.		at SIU Edwardsville	W 85–70	7–4 (1–0)	Vadalabene Center (277); Edwardsville, IL
December 31, 2022; 1:00 p.m.		at Lindenwood	W 72–35	8–4 (2–0)	Robert F. Hyland Performance Arena (723); St. Charles, MO
January 5, 2023; 5:30 p.m.		Eastern Illinois	L 62–67	8–5 (2–1)	Eblen Center (1,259); Cookeville, TN
January 7, 2023; 1:00 p.m.		at UT Martin	W 61–49	9–5 (3–1)	Skyhawk Arena (1,404); Martin, TN
January 12, 2023; 5:30 p.m.		Morehead State	W 69–52	10–5 (4–1)	Eblen Center (919); Cookeville, TN
January 14, 2023; 1:00 p.m.		Tennessee State	W 83–76	11–5 (5–1)	Eblen Center (1,128); Cookeville, TN
January 19, 2023; 5:00 p.m.		at Little Rock	L 45–61	11–6 (5–2)	Jack Stephens Center; Little Rock, AR
January 21, 2023; 2:00 p.m.		at Southeast Missouri State	W 76–72	12–6 (6–2)	Show Me Center (690); Cape Girardeau, MO
January 26, 2023; 3:00 p.m.		SIU Edwardsville	W 89–62	13–6 (7–2)	Eblen Center (711); Cookeville, TN
January 28, 2023; 1:00 p.m.		Little Rock	L 63–66	13–7 (7–3)	Eblen Center (1,188); Cookeville, TN
February 2, 2023; 5:00 p.m.		at Morehead State	L 68–70	13–8 (7–4)	Ellis Johnson Arena (1,034); Morehead, KY
February 4, 2023; 1:00 p.m.		Southeast Missouri State	W 71–65	14–8 (8–4)	Eblen Center (1,017); Cookeville, TN
February 9, 2023; 5:00 p.m.		Southern Indiana	W 79–59	15–8 (9–4)	Eblen Center (1,458); Cookeville, TN
February 11, 2023; 1:00 p.m.		at Tennessee State	L 72–81	15–9 (9–5)	Gentry Complex (1,779); Nashville, TN
February 16, 2023; 5:30 p.m.		Lindenwood	W 71–39	16–9 (10–5)	Eblen Center (769); Cookeville, TN
February 18, 2023; 1:00 p.m.		UT Martin	W 74–63	17–9 (11–5)	Eblen Center (1,422); Cookeville, TN
February 23, 2023; 5:00 p.m.		at Southern Indiana	W 78–57	18–9 (12–5)	Screaming Eagles Arena (1,142); Evansville, IN
February 25, 2023; 1:00 p.m.		at Eastern Illinois	W 66–61	19–9 (13–5)	Lantz Arena (1,511); Charleston, IL
Ohio Valley Conference tournament
March 2, 2023; 3:30 p.m., ESPN+	(3)	vs. (6) SIU Edwardsville; Quarterfinals	W 76–62	20–9	Ford Center (309); Evansville, IN
March 3, 2023; 4:30 p.m., ESPN+	(3)	vs. (2) Eastern Illinois; Semifinals	W 66–61	21–9	Ford Center (615); Evansville, IN
March 4, 2023; 3:00 p.m., ESPN+	(3)	vs. (1) Little Rock; Final	W 54–46	22–9	Ford Center (526); Evansville, IN
NCAA women's tournament
March 16, 2023*; 8:00 p.m., ESPN2	(16 G2)	vs. (16 G2) Monmouth; First Four	W 79–69	23–9	Simon Skjodt Assembly Hall (623); Bloomington, IN
March 18, 2023*; 11:30 a.m., ESPN2	(16 G2)	at (1 G2) No. 2 Indiana; First round	L 47–77	23–10	Simon Skjodt Assembly Hall; Bloomington, IN
*Non-conference game. ^{#}Rankings from AP poll. (#) Tournament seedings in parentheses. G2=Greenville 2. All times are in Central.

== See also ==
- 2022–23 Tennessee Tech Golden Eagles men's basketball team
