= Kim Rosamond =

American college basketball coach

Current position
- Title: Head coach
- Team: Tennessee Tech
- Conference: SoCon
- Record: 172–132 (.566)

Biographical details
- Born: February 17, 1975 (age 51); Louisville, Mississippi, U.S.

Playing career
- 1993–1998: Ole Miss

Coaching career (HC unless noted)
- 1998–2003: Ole Miss (assistant)
- 2003–2005: Middle Tennessee (assistant)
- 2007–2016: Vanderbilt (assistant)
- 2016–present: Tennessee Tech

Head coaching record
- Overall: 172–132 (.566)

Kim Rosamond (born February 17, 1975) is the head coach of the Tennessee Tech women's basketball team. She was named head coach on March 31, 2016. She was previously an assistant coach for the Vanderbilt Commodores for 9 years and an assistant at Middle Tennessee State University from 2003 to 2005, where she also served one month as interim head coach.

Rosamond was hired by Tennessee Tech following the 2015–16 season, when Jim Davis retired. In 2020, her contract was extended through 2025. She attended high school at Winston Academy in Louisville, Mississippi and played for Ole Miss in college. While at Ole Miss, she was the first player to earn all-academic SEC honors all four years. After her playing career at Ole Miss, she was an assistant there for 5 years.

== Head coaching record ==
Record table
Season	Team	Overall	Conference	Standing	Postseason
Tennessee Tech Golden Eagles (Ohio Valley Conference) (2016–2026)
2016–17	Tennessee Tech	10–20	7–9	T-6th	
2017–18	Tennessee Tech	7–22	4–14	T-10th	
2018–19	Tennessee Tech	22–11	12–6	3rd	WBI Quarterfinals
2019–20	Tennessee Tech	17–13	10–8	T-5th	Postseason not held
2020–21	Tennessee Tech	15–10	12–8	T-5th	
2021–22	Tennessee Tech	21–11	14–4	2nd	WNIT Second Round
2022–23	Tennessee Tech	23–10	13–5	3rd	NCAA First Round
2023–24	Tennessee Tech	16–15	10–8	6th	
2024–25	Tennessee Tech	26–6	18–2	1st	NCAA First Round
2025–26	Tennessee Tech	15–14	8–12	T–7th	
Tennessee Tech:		172–132 (.566)	108–76 (.587)		
Total:		172–132 (.566)			
National champion Postseason invitational champion Conference regular season champion Conference regular season and conference tournament champion Division regular season champion Division regular season and conference tournament champion Conference tournament champion
