= Kevin McMillan =

American basketball coach

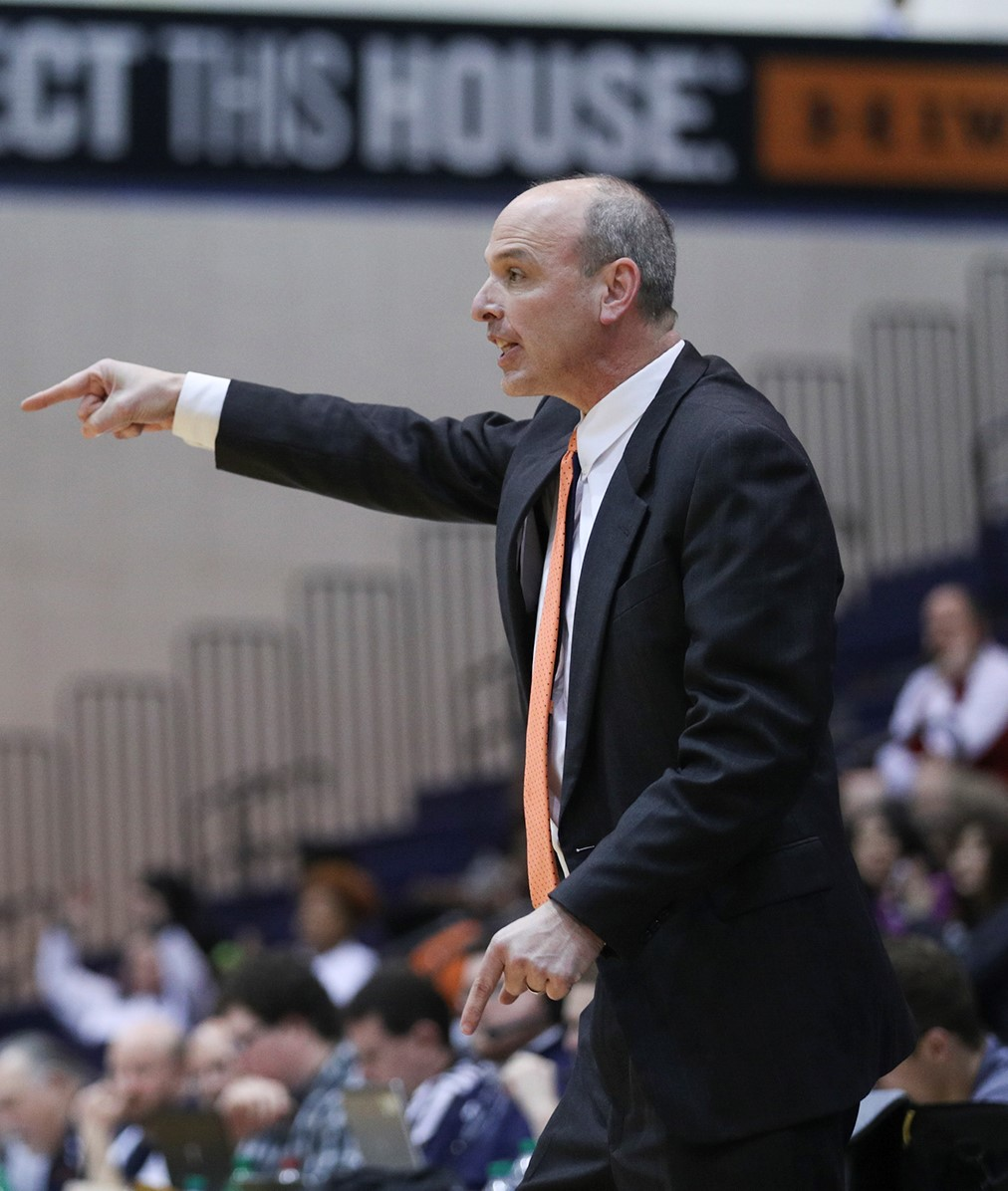
- McMillan in 2018

Current position
- Title: Head coach
- Team: UT Martin
- Conference: OVC
- Record: 307–230 (.572)

Biographical details
- Born: April 26, 1967 (age 59)
- Education: Rhodes College (BMath); Middle Tennessee State University (MHS)

Playing career
- 1985–1986: Wake Forest
- 1986–1989: Rhodes
- Position: Forward

Coaching career (HC unless noted)
- 1990–1997: Millington HS
- 1997–2005: Westview HS
- 2005–2007: Middle Tennessee (assistant)
- 2007–2009: Gibson County HS
- 2009–present: UT Martin

Administrative career (AD unless noted)
- 2016–2017: UT Martin (interim)

Head coaching record
- Overall: 307–230 (.572)
- Tournaments: 0–4 (NCAA Division I); 1–3 (WNIT)

Accomplishments and honors

Championships
- 4× OVC Tournament (2011–14); 6× OVC Regular Season (2012, 2014–16, 2020, 2021)

Awards
- 4× OVC Coach of the Year (2010, 2015, 2016, 2021)

Daniel Kevin McMillan (born April 26, 1967) is an American college basketball coach and the current women's head coach at the University of Tennessee at Martin (UT Martin). The UT Martin Skyhawks are members of the Ohio Valley Conference and compete in the NCAA Division I.

== Head coaching record ==
Record table
Season	Team	Overall	Conference	Standing	Postseason
UT Martin Skyhawks (Ohio Valley Conference) (2009–present)
2009–10	UT Martin	11–19	8–10	T–4th	
2010–11	UT Martin	21–11	14–4	2nd	NCAA First Round
2011–12	UT Martin	23–9	15–1	1st	NCAA First Round
2012–13	UT Martin	19–15	11–5	2nd (West)	NCAA First Round
2013–14	UT Martin	24–8	15–1	1st (West)	NCAA First Round
2014–15	UT Martin	22–11	16–0	1st	WNIT First Round
2015–16	UT Martin	22–10	14–2	1st	WNIT Second Round
2016–17	UT Martin	12–19	8–8	T-5th	
2017–18	UT Martin	19–15	13–5	T-2nd	WNIT First round
2018–19	UT Martin	23–9	13–5	T-2nd	
2019–20	UT Martin	22–10	16–2	T–1st	no postseason held
2020–21	UT Martin	22–6	17–2	1st	WNIT First Round
2021–22	UT Martin	12–18	9–9	6th	
2022–23	UT Martin	13–17	9–9	5th	
2023–24	UT Martin	16–17	11–7	T–2nd	NCAA First Four
2024–25	UT Martin	13–19	10–10	6th	
2025–26	UT Martin	13–17	9–11	6th	
2026–27	UT Martin	0–0	0–0		
UT Martin:		307–230 (.572)	208–91 (.696)		
Total:		307–230 (.572)			
National champion Postseason invitational champion Conference regular season champion Conference regular season and conference tournament champion Division regular season champion Division regular season and conference tournament champion Conference tournament champion
