= Tennessee State Lady Tigers basketball =

Tennessee State Lady Tigers
2026–27 Tennessee State Lady Tigers basketball team
- University: Tennessee State University
- Head coach: Candice Dupree (3rd season)
- Location: Nashville, Tennessee
- Arena: Gentry Complex (capacity: 10,500)
- Conference: Ohio Valley
- Nickname: Lady Tigers
- Colors: Reflex blue and white

NCAA Division I tournament appearances
- 1994, 1995, 2015

Conference tournament champions
- 1994, 1995, 2015

Conference regular-season champions
- 1994, 1995

The Tennessee State Lady Tigers basketball team represents Tennessee State University (TSU) in women's basketball in Nashville, Tennessee. The school's team currently competes in the Ohio Valley Conference. They play their home games at the Gentry Complex.

== History ==
Tennessee State began play in 1977. The Lady Tigers joined the OVC in 1987. They have an all-time record (as of the end of the 2015–16 season) of 356–566.

== NCAA tournament results ==
Year	Seed	Round	Opponent	Result
1994	#13	First Round	#4 Southern Miss	L 72-86
1995	#12	First Round	#5 Oregon State	L 75-88 (OT)
2015	#15	First Round	#2 Kentucky	L 52-97
