= UT Martin Skyhawks women's basketball =

2026–27 UT Martin Skyhawks women's basketball team
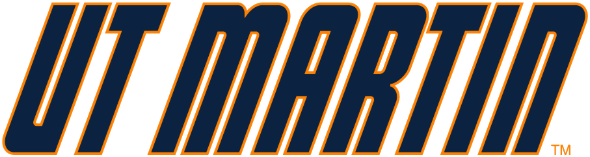
- University: University of Tennessee at Martin
- Head coach: Kevin McMillan (18th season)
- Location: Martin, Tennessee
- Arena: Skyhawk Arena (capacity: 4,300)
- Conference: Ohio Valley
- Nickname: Skyhawks
- Colors: Navy blue, orange, and white

NCAA Division I tournament appearances
- 2011, 2012, 2013, 2014, 2024

AIAW tournament quarterfinals
- 1972
Other AIAW tournament results
Second round	1972
Appearances	1972

Conference tournament champions
- 2011, 2012, 2013, 2014

Conference regular-season champions
- 1999, 2012, 2014, 2015, 2016, 2020, 2021

Uniforms
Home	Away

The UT Martin Skyhawks women's basketball team is the team that is representing the University of Tennessee at Martin located in Martin, Tennessee, United States. The school's program currently competes in the Ohio Valley Conference.

== History ==
Since the beginning of play in 1969, the Skyhawks have an all-time record of 578–687, per the end of the 2015–16 season. They appeared in the inaugural AIAW women's basketball tournament in 1972, beating Long Beach State 53–43 in the First Round before losing to Mississippi University for Women state college 43–25. Since 1999, the Skyhawks have won the Ohio Valley Conference season title five times while also winning the tournament four times, with two of them being both in the same year. They have also made three appearances in the WNIT (1999, 2015, 2016).

== Postseason results ==
=== NCAA Division I ===
The Skyhawks have appeared in the NCAA Division I women's basketball tournament 5 times. They have a combined record of 0–5.

Year	Seed	Round	Opponent	Result
2011	#15	First Round	#2 Duke	L 45–90
2012	#15	First Round	#2 Tennessee	L 49–72
2013	#16	First Round	#1 Notre Dame	L 64–97
2014	#13	First Round	#4 North Carolina	L 58–60
2024	#16	First Four	#16 Holy Cross	L 45–72

=== AIAW Division I ===
The Skyhawks made one appearance in the AIAW National Division I basketball tournament. They had a record of 1–1.

Year	Round	Opponent	Result
1972	First Round; Quarterfinals	Long Beach State; Mississippi State for Women	W, 53–43; L, 25–43
