= Little Rock Trojans women's basketball =

Little Rock Trojans
2026–27 Little Rock Trojans women's basketball team
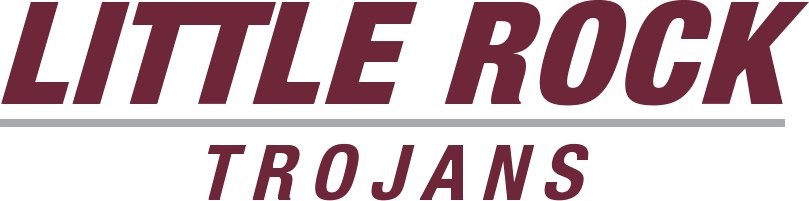
- University: University of Arkansas at Little Rock
- Head coach: Steve Wiedower (3rd season)
- Location: Little Rock, Arkansas
- Arena: Jack Stephens Center (capacity: 5,600)
- Conference: UAC
- Nickname: Trojans
- Colors: Maroon, silver, and white
- Student section: Maroon Mob

NCAA Division I tournament round of 32
- 2010, 2015

NCAA Division I tournament appearances
- 2010, 2011, 2012, 2015, 2018, 2019

Conference tournament champions
- 2011, 2012, 2015, 2018, 2019

Conference regular-season champions
- 2015, 2017, 2018, 2019, 2023

Conference division champions
- 2008, 2009, 2010, 2013

Uniforms
Home	Away

The Little Rock Trojans women's basketball team represents the University of Arkansas at Little Rock in Little Rock, Arkansas, United States. The school joined the United Athletic Conference (UAC) on July 1, 2026, after 31 seasons in the Sun Belt Conference and 4 seasons in the Ohio Valley Conference.

== History ==
Little Rock has won the West Division in the Sun Belt in 2008, 2009, 2010, and 2013. They won the Sun Belt Conference Tournament in 2011, 2012, and 2015. They have made the WNIT in 2008, 2009, and 2013. They made the Second Round of the NCAA Tournament in 2010 beating Georgia Tech 63–53. They lost to Oklahoma 60–44 in the subsequent game. They made the Second Round in 2015 after beating Texas A&M 69–60. They lost 57–54 to Arizona State in the subsequent game. As of the end of the 2015–16 season, the Trojans have an all-time record of 384–485, with a 288–231 record since joining Division I in 1999.

== NCAA tournament results ==
Year	Seed	Round	Opponent	Result
2010	#11	First Round; Second Round	#6 Georgia Tech #3 Oklahoma	W 63–54; L 44–60
2011	#12	First Round	#5 Green Bay	L 55–59
2012	#14	First Round	#3 Delaware	L 42–73
2015	#11	First Round; Second Round	#6 Texas A&M #3 Arizona State	W 69–60; L 54–57
2018	#14	First Round	#3 Florida State	L 49–91
2019	#12	First Round	#5 Gonzaga	L 51–68
