= 2023 Ohio Valley Conference women's basketball tournament =

- Classification: Division I
- Season: 2022–23
- Teams: 8
- Site: Ford Center; Evansville, Indiana
- Champions: Tennessee Tech (10th title)
- Winning coach: Kim Rosamond (1st title)
- Television: ESPN+

The 2023 Ohio Valley Conference Women's Basketball Tournament was the final event of the 2022–23 NCAA Division I women's basketball season in the Ohio Valley Conference. The tournament was held from March 1 through March 4, 2023, at the Ford Center in Evansville, Indiana.

2022–23 Ohio Valley Conference women's basketball standings
	Conf.				Overall
Team	W		L	PCT	W		L	PCT
Little Rock	17	–	1	.944	21	–	10	.677
Eastern Illinois	14	–	4	.778	21	–	8	.724
Tennessee Tech†	13	–	5	.722	22	–	9	.710
Southeast Missouri State	10	–	8	.556	16	–	15	.516
UT Martin	9	–	9	.500	13	–	17	.433
Tennessee State	7	–	11	.389	11	–	18	.379
SIU Edwardsville	7	–	11	.389	9	–	22	.290
Morehead State	6	–	12	.333	11	–	20	.355
Southern Indiana*	6	–	12	.333	12	–	17	.414
Lindenwood*	1	–	17	.056	2	–	24	.077
† 2023 OVC tournament winner * ineligible for the 2023 NCAA tournament due to transition period As of March 5, 2023

== Seeds ==
Only the top eight teams in the conference qualified for the tournament. Teams were seeded by record within the conference, with a tiebreaker system used to seed teams with identical conference records.

Seed	School	Conf.	Tiebreaker 1	Tiebreaker 2
1	Little Rock	17-1		
2	Eastern Illinois	14-4		
3	Tennessee Tech	13-5		
4	Southeast Missouri State	10–8		
5	UT Martin	9-9		
6	SIU Edwardsville	7-11	1-1 vs. Tennessee State	1-1 vs. Eastern Illinois
7	Tennessee State	7–11	1-1 vs. SIUE	0-2 vs. Eastern Illinois
8	Morehead State	6-12	1-1 vs. Southern Indiana	1-1 vs. Tennessee Tech
DNQ	Southern Indiana	6-12	1-1 vs. Morehead State	0-2 vs. Tennessee Tech
DNQ	Lindenwood	1-17		

== Schedule ==
Game	Time	Matchup	Score	Television
First Round – Wednesday, March 1
1	1:00 pm	No. 5 UT Martin vs. No. 8 Morehead State	68–70	ESPN+
2	3:30 pm	No. 6 SIU Edwardsville vs. No. 7 Tennessee State	71–64	ESPN+
Quarterfinals – Thursday, March 2
3	1:00 pm	No. 4 Southeast Missouri State vs. No. 8 Morehead State	77–38	ESPN+
4	3:30 pm	No. 3 Tennessee Tech vs. No. 6 SIU Edwardsville	76–62	ESPN+
Semifinals – Friday, March 3
5	1:00 pm	No. 1 Little Rock vs. No. 4 Southeast Missouri State	49–35	ESPN+
6	3:30 pm	No. 2 Eastern Illinois vs. No. 3 Tennessee Tech	61–66	ESPN+
Championship – Saturday, March 4
7	2:00 pm	No. 1 Little Rock vs. No. 3 Tennessee Tech	46–54	ESPN+
All game times in Central Time.

== Bracket ==
First Round; Wednesday, March 1
5	UT Martin	68
8	Morehead State	70
6	SIU Edwardsville	71
7	Tennessee State	64

Quarterfinals; Thursday, March 2
4	Southeast Missouri State	77
8	Morehead State	38
3	Tennessee Tech	76
6	SIU Edwardsville	62

Semifinals; Friday, March 3
1	Little Rock	49
4	Southeast Missouri State	35
2	Eastern Illinois	61
3	Tennessee Tech	66

Championship; Saturday, March 4
1	Little Rock	46
3	Tennessee Tech	54
