= Hooper Eblen Center =

Sports facility in Cookeville, Tennessee

- The Hoop
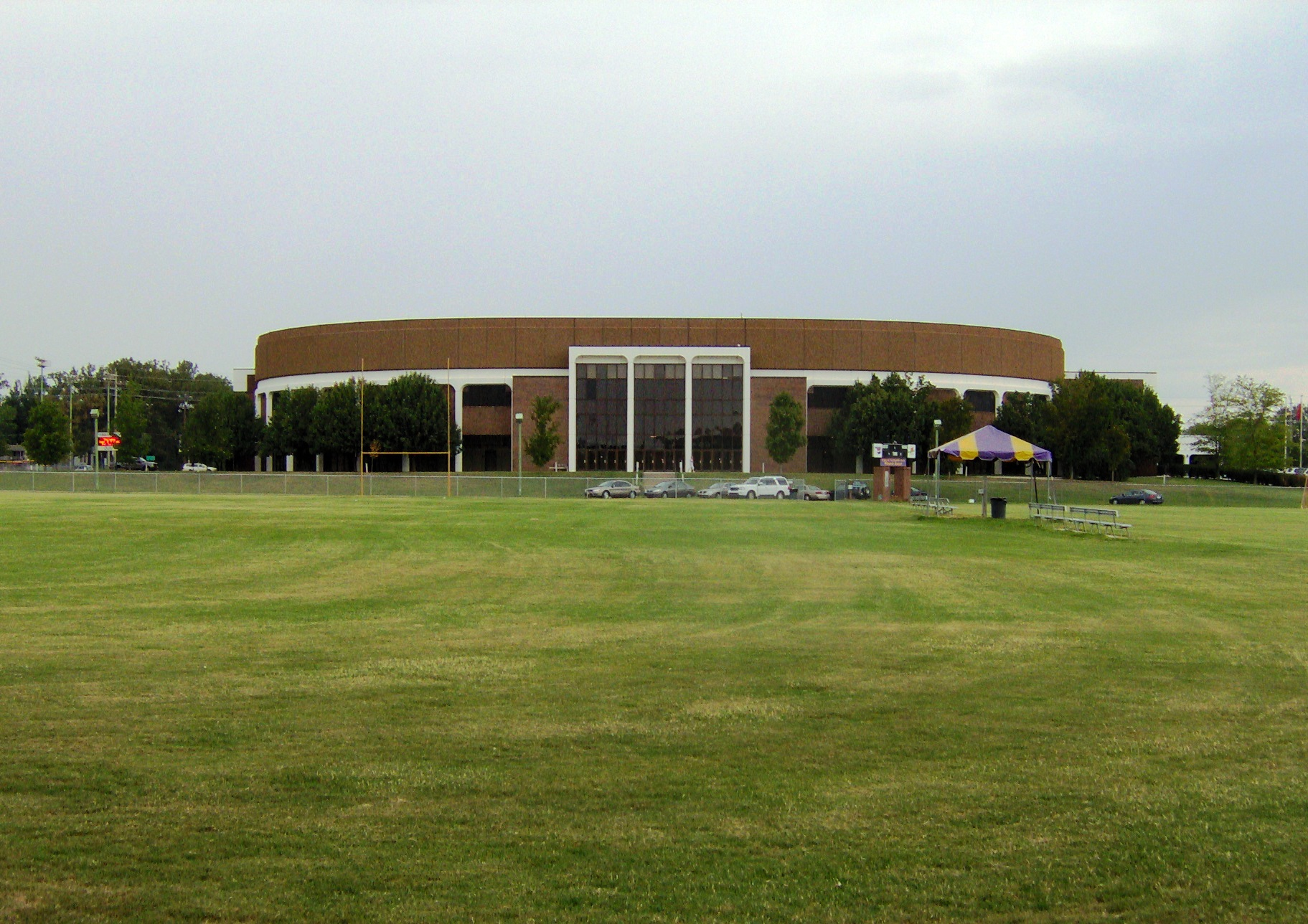
- Hooper Eblen Center in 2007
- Interactive map of Hooper Eblen Center
- Address: 1100 McGee Boulevard
- Location: Cookeville, Tennessee
- Coordinates: 36.178508°N 85.510000°W
- Owner: Tennessee Technological University
- Operator: Tennessee Technological University
- Capacity: 9,282

Construction
- Opened: October 2, 1977

Tenant
- Tennessee Tech Golden Eagles (NCAA) (1977–present)

Hooper Eblen Center, often called The Hoop by students, is a 9,282-seat multi-purpose arena located on the campus of Tennessee Tech in Cookeville, Tennessee. Named for former TTU coach and professor Hooper Eblen, the arena is home to the Tennessee Tech Golden Eagles men's basketball, the Golden Eagles women's basketball, and the women's volleyball teams. Before the construction of the arena, the on-campus home to the Tennessee Tech men's and women's basketball teams was the Memorial Gym, a post-war gymnasium located on the quadrangle.

The Hooper Eblen Center opened on October 2, 1977, with a Phoebe Snow concert as its inaugural event. Elvis Presley had originally been scheduled to give the arena's first performance on September 27. However, these plans were canceled after the late singer's death on August 16. Alabama performed the first sell-out concert at the Hooper Eblen Center on August 1, 1982, with 11,210 people in attendance.

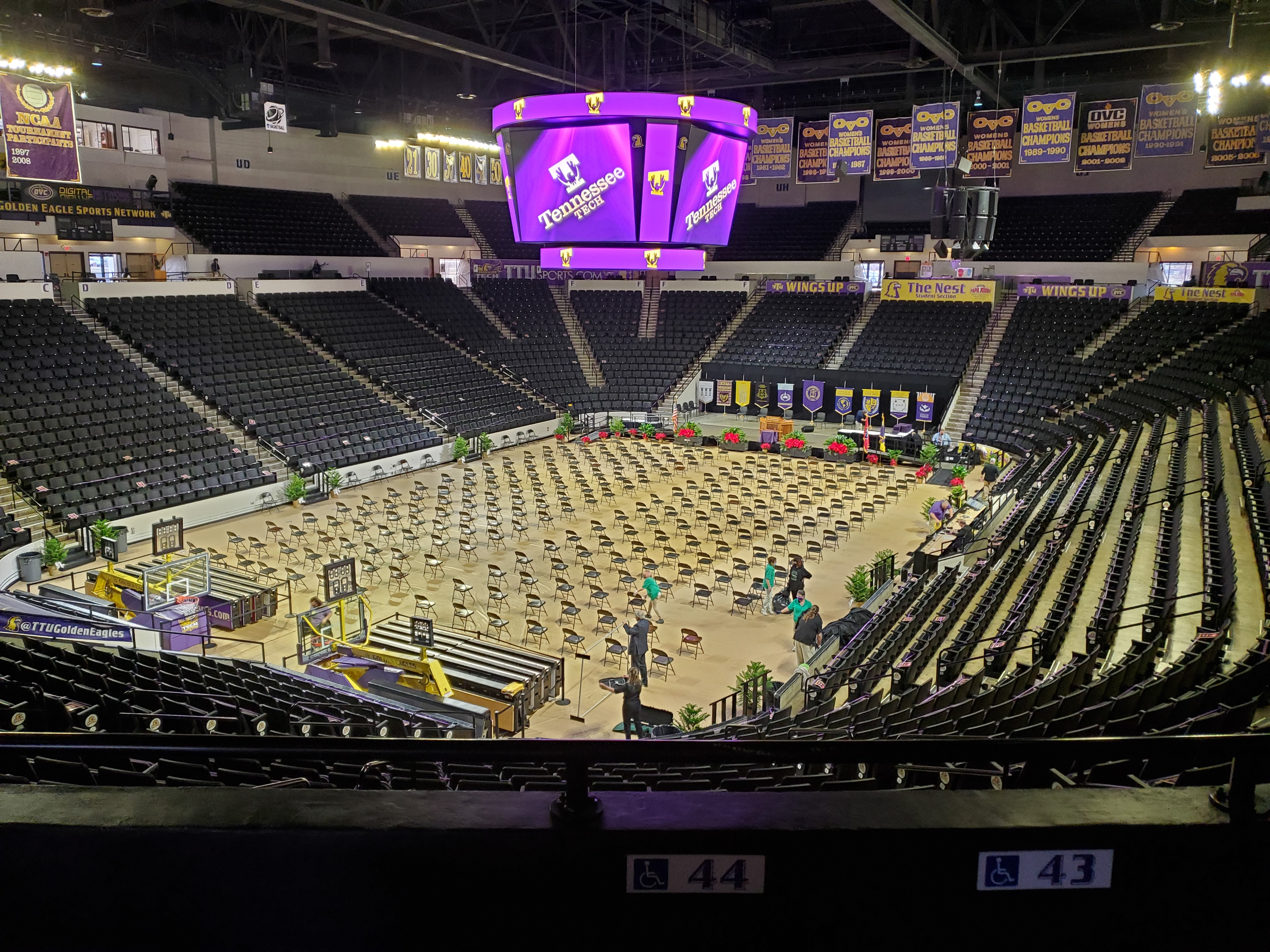
Interior of the Hooper Eblen Center, following a graduation ceremony in 2020

== See also ==
- List of NCAA Division I basketball arenas
