= Gentry Complex =

American university sports arena

- Interactive map of Gentry Complex
- Location: 3400 John A Merritt Blvd, Nashville, Tennessee, 37209
- Coordinates: 36.1691°N 86.8294°W

Construction
- Opened: 1980

Tenant
- TSU Tigers

Gentry Complex is a multi-purpose facility on the main campus of Tennessee State University (TSU) in Nashville, Tennessee. Opened in 1980 and named for Howard C. Gentry Sr., a long-time professor, coach and athletic director at TSU, the building houses the university's Department of Health, Physical Education and Recreation and also contains an arena, dance studio, indoor track, Olympic swimming pool, racquetball courts, and the training and weight room. The 9,100-seat arena is home to the TSU Tigers men's basketball team. The Gentry Complex replaced Kean Hall Gymnasium, nicknamed "Kean's Little Garden," which had been their home for 27 years.

== See also ==
- List of NCAA Division I basketball arenas
