= 2024–25 Western Illinois Leathernecks women's basketball team =

American college basketball season

2024–25 Western Illinois Leathernecks women's basketball
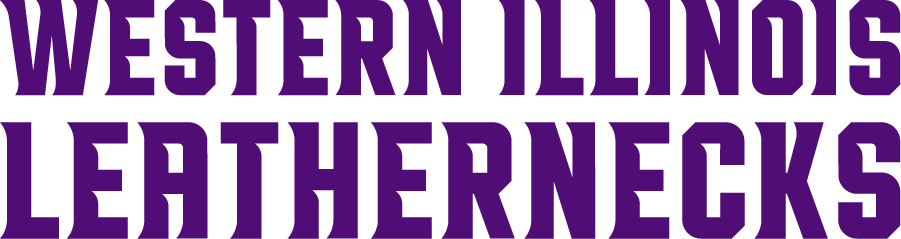
- Conference: Ohio Valley Conference
- Record: 17–17 (8–12 OVC)
- Head coach: JD Gravina (14th season)
- Associate head coach: Dan Chapla
- Assistant coaches: Alexa Tovella; Olivia Travis
- Home arena: Western Hall

2024–25 Ohio Valley Conference women's basketball standings
	Conf.				Overall
Team	W		L	PCT	W		L	PCT
Tennessee Tech †	18	–	2	.900	26	–	6	.813
Lindenwood*	16	–	4	.800	23	–	11	.676
Eastern Illinois	15	–	5	.750	18	–	12	.600
Little Rock	12	–	8	.600	14	–	16	.467
Southern Indiana*	12	–	8	.600	23	–	13	.639
UT Martin	10	–	10	.500	13	–	19	.406
Western Illinois	8	–	12	.400	17	–	17	.500
Tennessee State	6	–	14	.300	10	–	21	.323
Morehead State	5	–	15	.250	10	–	20	.333
Southeast Missouri State	4	–	16	.200	6	–	23	.207
SIU Edwardsville	4	–	16	.200	6	–	23	.207
† 2025 OVC tournament winner * ineligible for the 2025 NCAA tournament due to transition period

The 2024–25 Western Illinois Leathernecks women's basketball team represented Western Illinois University during the 2024–25 NCAA Division I women's basketball season. The Leathernecks, who were led by 14th-year head coach JD Gravina, played their home games at Western Hall in Macomb, Illinois, as second-year members of the Ohio Valley Conference.

== Previous season ==
The Leathernecks finished the 2023–24 season 18–12, 9–9 in OVC play, to finish in seventh place. They were defeated by Tennessee Tech in the first round of the OVC tournament.

== Preseason ==
On October 16, 2024, the OVC released their preseason coaches poll. Western Illinois was picked to finish sixth in the OVC regular season.

=== Preseason rankings ===
OVC preseason poll
Predicted finish	Team	Votes (1st place)
1	Southern Indiana	200 (20)
2	UT Martin	180 (2)
3	Eastern Illinois	145
4	Tennessee Tech	140
5	Little Rock	135
6	Western Illinois	119
7	Lindenwood	81
T-8	SIU Edwardsville	61
T-8	Morehead State	61
10	Tennessee State	59
11	Southeast Missouri State	29

=== Players to Watch ===
Each OVC team selected two "Players to Watch" for their team.

Players to Watch
Player	Position	Year
Raegan McCowan	Guard	Sophomore
Addi Brownfield	Guard	Junior

== Roster ==
2024–25 Western Illinois Leathernecks women's basketball team
Players
Coaches

Pos.	#	Name	Height	Year	Previous school	Hometown
G	1	Madison Davis	5 ft 10 in (1.78 m)	Fr	Marian Catholic High School	Flossmoor, Illinois
G	2	Shelby Bowman	5 ft 6 in (1.68 m)	Fr	West Central High School	Biggsville, Illinois
G	4	Allie Meadows	5 ft 8 in (1.73 m)	Jr	Central DeWitt High School	DeWitt, Iowa
F	5	Maria Messling	6 ft 0 in (1.83 m)	RS Fr	Evansville High School	Evansville, Wisconsin
G	10	Mallory McDermott (5Y)	5 ft 8 in (1.73 m)	Sr	Cedar Rapids Prairie High School	Fairfax, Iowa
G	12	Raegan McCowan	5 ft 11 in (1.8 m)	So	Lebanon High School	Lebanon, Missouri
G	13	Addi Brownfield	5 ft 9 in (1.75 m)	Jr	Boonville High School	Boonville, Missouri
G	14	Ainsley Holthaus	5 ft 4 in (1.63 m)	So	Macomb High School	Macomb, Illinois
G/F	20	Kennedy Herrig	5 ft 10 in (1.78 m)	Fr	Liberty North High School	Liberty, Missouri
G/F	22	Mia Nicastro	6 ft 2 in (1.88 m)	Jr	Saint Louis	St. Charles, Missouri
F	23	Jasmine Nichols	6 ft 1 in (1.85 m)	Sr	Moorpark College	Oxnard, California
F	31	Kennedy Flanagan (5Y)	6 ft 0 in (1.83 m)	Sr	Highland High School	Canton, Missouri
G	32	Kaylen Reed	5 ft 5 in (1.65 m)	So	Rochester High School	Rochester, Illinois
F	44	Katelyn Eggena	6 ft 1 in (1.85 m)	Fr	Waverly-Shell Rock High School	Waverly, Iowa

Head coach

- JD Gravina (William Jewell)

Assistant coach(es)

- Dan Chapla (Ottawa)
- Alexa Tovella (Barton)
- Olivia Travis (Oklahoma Christian)

Legend

- (C) Team captain
- (S) Suspended
- (I) Ineligible
- (W) Walk-on
- (5Y) Fifth-year senior
- Injured
- Current redshirt

Roster
Last update: April 21, 2025

== Schedule and results ==
Date time, TV	Rank^{#}	Opponent^{#}	Result	Record	Site (attendance) city, state
Exhibition
October 24, 2024*; 7:00 pm		McKendree	W 78–49	–	Western Hall; Macomb, IL
October 30, 2024*; 7:00 pm		Dubuque	W 90–43	–	Western Hall (245); Macomb, IL
Non-conference regular season
November 5, 2024*; 7:00 pm, ESPN+		Culver–Stockton	W 89–42	1–0	Western Hall (711); Macomb, IL
November 10, 2024*; 2:00 pm, SLN		at Omaha	W 89–83	2–0	Baxter Arena (306); Omaha, NE
November 12, 2024*; 7:00 pm, ESPN+		Kansas City	W 62–43	3–0	Western Hall (623); Macomb, IL
November 15, 2024*; 7:00 pm, ESPN+		Missouri	L 55–75	3–1	Western Hall (1,853); Macomb, IL
November 18, 2024*; 6:00 pm, NEC Front Row		at Chicago State	W 93–75	4–1	Jones Convocation Center (140); Chicago, IL
November 24, 2024*; 2:00 pm, ESPN+		at Bradley	W 62–41	5–1	Renaissance Coliseum (385); Peoria, IL
December 6, 2024*; 5:30 pm, ESPN+		at Cincinnati	L 52–95	5–2	Fifth Third Arena (918); Cincinnati, OH
December 14, 2024*; 1:00 pm, SLN		at St. Thomas	L 56–69	5–3	Schoenecker Arena (421); St. Paul, MN
OVC regular season
December 17, 2024; 5:00 pm, ESPN+		Tennessee Tech	L 52–72	5–4 (0–1)	Western Hall (423); Macomb, IL
December 21, 2024; 1:00 pm, ESPN+		at Lindenwood	L 59–63	5–5 (0–2)	Robert F. Hyland Arena (872); St. Charles, MO
December 30, 2024*; 7:00 pm, ESPN+		Clarke	W 97–58	6–5	Western Hall (494); Macomb, IL
January 2, 2025; 5:00 pm, ESPN+		at SIU Edwardsville	W 75–48	7–5 (1–2)	First Community Arena (1,331); Edwardsville, IL
January 4, 2025; 1:00 pm, ESPN+		at Eastern Illinois	L 60–70	7–6 (1–3)	Groniger Arena (506); Charleston, IL
January 9, 2025; 5:00 pm, ESPN+		UT Martin	L 60–73	7–7 (1–4)	Western Hall (567); Macomb, IL
January 11, 2025; 1:00 pm, ESPN+		Tennessee State	W 88–67	8–7 (2–4)	Western Hall (603); Macomb, IL
January 16, 2025; 4:00 pm, ESPN+		at Morehead State	W 92–63	9–7 (3–4)	Ellis Johnson Arena (682); Morehead, KY
January 18, 2025; 1:00 pm, ESPN+		at Southern Indiana	L 58–72	9–8 (3–5)	Liberty Arena (1,606); Evansville, IN
January 23, 2025; 5:00 pm, ESPN+		Little Rock	L 60–65	9–9 (3–6)	Western Hall (616); Macomb, IL
January 25, 2025; 1:00 pm, ESPN+		Southeast Missouri State	W 94–66	10–9 (4–6)	Western Hall (677); Macomb, IL
January 30, 2025; 5:00 pm, ESPN+		Eastern Illinois	W 62–52	11–9 (5–6)	Western Hall (512); Macomb, IL
February 1, 2025; 1:00 pm, ESPN+		SIU Edwardsville	W 94–82	12–9 (6–6)	Western Hall (917); Macomb, IL
February 6, 2025; 11:00 am, ESPN+		at Tennessee State	L 66–70	12–10 (6–7)	Gentry Center (1,763); Nashville, TN
February 8, 2025; 1:00 pm, ESPN+		at UT Martin	L 55–75	12–11 (6–8)	Skyhawk Arena (1,423); Martin, TN
February 13, 2025; 5:00 pm, ESPN+		Southern Indiana	L 70–76	12–12 (6–9)	Western Hall (387); Macomb, IL
February 15, 2025; 11:00 am, ESPN+		Morehead State	W 78–73 ^{OT}	13–12 (7–9)	Western Hall (412); Macomb, IL
February 20, 2025; 5:15 pm, ESPN+		at Southeast Missouri State	L 49–51	13–13 (7–10)	Show Me Center (585); Cape Girardeau, MO
February 22, 2025; 1:00 pm, ESPN+		at Little Rock	L 80–86	13–14 (7–11)	Jack Stephens Center; Little Rock, AR
February 25, 2025; 5:00 pm, ESPN+		Lindenwood	W 75–70	14–14 (8–11)	Western Hall (814); Macomb, IL
February 27, 2025; 5:30 pm, ESPN+		at Tennessee Tech	L 51–68	14–15 (8–12)	Hooper Eblen Center (1,028); Cookeville, TN
OVC tournament
March 5, 2025; 3:00 pm, ESPN+	(7)	vs. (6) UT Martin; First Round	W 78–72	15–15	Ford Center (849); Evansville, IN
March 6, 2025; 3:00 pm, ESPN+	(6)	vs. (3) Eastern Illinois; Quarterfinals	W 78–75	16–15	Ford Center (1,177); Evansville, IN
March 7, 2025; 3:30 pm, ESPN+	(6)	vs. (2) Lindenwood; Semifinals	L 75–86	16–16	Ford Center (1,115); Evansville, IN
WNIT
March 20, 2025*; 6:00 pm, ESPN+		Lipscomb; First Round	W 89–74	17–16	Western Hall (1,125); Macomb, IL
March 23, 2025*; 2:00 pm, ESPN+		at Illinois State; Second Round	L 80–90	17–17	CEFCU Arena (1,551); Normal, IL
*Non-conference game. ^{#}Rankings from AP Poll. (#) Tournament seedings in parentheses. All times are in Central.
