= 2024–25 Little Rock Trojans women's basketball team =

American college basketball season

2024–25 Little Rock Trojans women's basketball
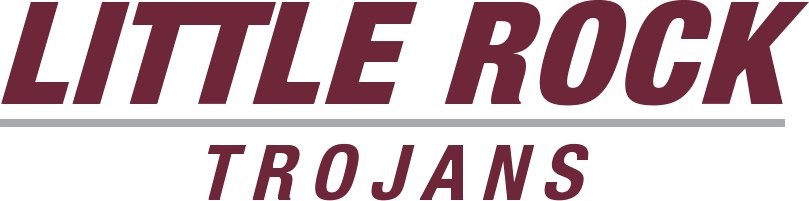
- Conference: Ohio Valley Conference
- Record: 14–16 (12–8 OVC)
- Head coach: Steve Wiedower (1st season)
- Assistant coaches: Alicia Cash; Bobby Brasel; Chastity Reed
- Home arena: Jack Stephens Center

2024–25 Ohio Valley Conference women's basketball standings
	Conf.				Overall
Team	W		L	PCT	W		L	PCT
Tennessee Tech †	18	–	2	.900	26	–	6	.813
Lindenwood*	16	–	4	.800	23	–	11	.676
Eastern Illinois	15	–	5	.750	18	–	12	.600
Little Rock	12	–	8	.600	14	–	16	.467
Southern Indiana*	12	–	8	.600	23	–	13	.639
UT Martin	10	–	10	.500	13	–	19	.406
Western Illinois	8	–	12	.400	17	–	17	.500
Tennessee State	6	–	14	.300	10	–	21	.323
Morehead State	5	–	15	.250	10	–	20	.333
Southeast Missouri State	4	–	16	.200	6	–	23	.207
SIU Edwardsville	4	–	16	.200	6	–	23	.207
† 2025 OVC tournament winner * ineligible for the 2025 NCAA tournament due to transition period

The 2024–25 Little Rock Trojans women's basketball team represented the University of Arkansas at Little Rock during the 2024–25 NCAA Division I women's basketball season. The Trojans, who were led by first-year head coach Steve Wiedower, played their home games at the Jack Stephens Center in Little Rock, Arkansas as members of the Ohio Valley Conference.

== Previous season ==
The Trojans finished the 2023–24 season 12–18, 11–7 in OVC play, to finish in a three-way tie for second place. They were defeated by UT Martin in the semifinals of the OVC tournament.

On July 18, 2024, longtime head coach Joe Foley announced that he would be retiring, after leading the program for 21 seasons, with associate head coach Steve Wiedower being named Foley's successor.

== Preseason ==
On October 16, 2024, the OVC released their preseason coaches poll. Little Rock was picked to finish fifth in the OVC regular season.

=== Preseason rankings ===
OVC preseason poll
Predicted finish	Team	Votes (1st place)
1	Southern Indiana	200 (20)
2	UT Martin	180 (2)
3	Eastern Illinois	145
4	Tennessee Tech	140
5	Little Rock	135
6	Western Illinois	119
7	Lindenwood	81
T-8	SIU Edwardsville	61
T-8	Morehead State	61
10	Tennessee State	59
11	Southeast Missouri State	29

=== Players to Watch ===
Each OVC team selected two "Players to Watch" for their team.

Players to Watch
Player	Position	Year
Jayla Brooks	Guard	Graduate student
Faith Lee	Forward	Junior

== Roster ==
2024–25 Little Rock Trojans women's basketball team
Players
Coaches

Pos.	#	Name	Height	Year	Previous school	Hometown
G	0	Sug Williams	5 ft 8 in (1.73 m)	GS	Oakland	Eastpointe, Michigan
G	1	Brenna Burk	5 ft 7 in (1.7 m)	Fr	Russellville High School	Russellville, Arkansas
F	2	Mesi Triplett	6 ft 3 in (1.91 m)	Sr	St. Petersburg College	Orlando, Florida
G	3	Jayla Brooks	5 ft 7 in (1.7 m)	GS	Panola College	Sachse, Texas
G	4	Alaina Payne	5 ft 9 in (1.75 m)	Jr	McLennan Community College	Fort Worth, Texas
G/F	5	Jordan Holman	5 ft 10 in (1.78 m)	Sr	Northern Oklahoma College	Hugo, Oklahoma
F	8	Jamyia Bowen	6 ft 2 in (1.88 m)	Jr	Itawamba Community College	Shannon, Mississippi
F	11	Faith Lee	5 ft 11 in (1.8 m)	Jr	Ouachita Parish High School	Monroe, Louisiana
G	21	Perina Leime	5 ft 9 in (1.75 m)	Jr	Kilgore College	Melbourne, Australia
F	23	Annemarie Batista	6 ft 1 in (1.85 m)	RS Jr	Mesa Community College	Tucson, Arizona
G	24	Ashley Lester	5 ft 8 in (1.73 m)	So	Florida SouthWestern State College	Athens, Georgia
C	25	Emerald Parker	6 ft 3 in (1.91 m)	RS Fr	Carroll High School	Ruston, Louisiana

Head coach

- Steve Wiedower (Arkansas State)

Assistant coach(es)

- Alicia Cash (Little Rock)
- Bobby Brasel (UT Permian Basin)
- Chastity Reed (Little Rock)

Legend

- (C) Team captain
- (S) Suspended
- (I) Ineligible
- (W) Walk-on
- Injured
- Current redshirt

Roster
Last update: April 19, 2025

== Schedule and results ==
Date time, TV	Rank^{#}	Opponent^{#}	Result	Record	Site (attendance) city, state
Non-conference regular season
November 6, 2024*; 7:00 pm, ESPN+		Central Baptist	W 88–43	1–0	Jack Stephens Center (545); Little Rock, AR
November 11, 2024*; 7:00 pm, ESPN+		Arkansas	L 60–71	1–1	Jack Stephens Center (1,254); Little Rock, AR
November 14, 2024*; 7:00 pm, SECN		at Auburn	L 48–82	1–2	Neville Arena (2,682); Auburn, AL
November 18, 2024*; 6:30 pm, ESPN+		at No. 10 Kansas State	L 43–73	1–3	Bramlage Coliseum (3,437); Manhattan, KS
November 22, 2024*; 11:30 am, SECN+		at Missouri	L 49–78	1–4	Mizzou Arena (4,681); Columbia, MO
November 26, 2024*; 7:00 pm, ESPN+		Murray State	L 57–105	1–5	Jack Stephens Center (651); Little Rock, AR
December 3, 2024*; 7:00 pm, ESPN+		Arkansas State	W 59–49	2–5	Jack Stephens Center (685); Little Rock, AR
December 7, 2024*; 1:00 pm, ESPN+		at Central Arkansas; Governor's I-40 Showdown	L 42–55	2–6	Farris Center (865); Conway, AR
December 14, 2024*; 1:00 pm, ESPN+		at Missouri State	L 45–67	2–7	Great Southern Bank Arena (1,853); Springfield, MO
OVC regular season
December 19, 2024; 5:00 pm, ESPN+		SIU Edwardsville	W 83–60	3–7 (1–0)	Jack Stephens Center; Little Rock, AR
December 21, 2024; 1:00 pm, ESPN+		Eastern Illinois	L 56–59	3–8 (1–1)	Jack Stephens Center (593); Little Rock, AR
January 2, 2025; 5:30 pm, ESPN+		at UT Martin	W 66–61	4–8 (2–1)	Skyhawk Arena (1,021); Martin, TN
January 4, 2025; 1:00 pm, ESPN+		at Tennessee State	W 67–63	5–8 (3–1)	Gentry Center (174); Nashville, TN
January 9, 2025; 11:00 am, ESPN+		Morehead State	W 69–59	6–8 (4–1)	Jack Stephens Center (225); Little Rock, AR
January 12, 2025; 1:00 pm, ESPN+		Southern Indiana	W 89–83 ^{OT}	7–8 (5–1)	Jack Stephens Center (470); Little Rock, AR
January 14, 2025; 5:15 pm, ESPN+		at Southeast Missouri State	W 67–63	8–8 (6–1)	Show Me Center; Cape Girardeau, MO
January 18, 2025; 1:00 pm, ESPN+		at Tennessee Tech	L 49–70	8–9 (6–2)	Hooper Eblen Center (996); Cookeville, TN
January 23, 2025; 5:00 pm, ESPN+		at Western Illinois	W 65–60	9–9 (7–2)	Western Hall (616); Macomb, IL
January 25, 2025; 1:00 pm, ESPN+		at Lindenwood	L 68–70	9–10 (7–3)	Robert F. Hyland Arena (453); St. Charles, MO
January 30, 2025; 5:00 pm, ESPN+		Tennessee State	W 67–60	10–10 (8–3)	Jack Stephens Center (450); Little Rock, AR
February 1, 2025; 2:00 pm, ESPN+		UT Martin	L 59–64	10–11 (8–4)	Jack Stephens Center (600); Little Rock, AR
February 6, 2025; 5:00 pm, ESPN+		at Southern Indiana	W 75–61	11–11 (9–4)	Liberty Arena (943); Evansville, IN
February 8, 2025; 10:00 am, ESPN+		at Morehead State	W 66–63	12–11 (10–4)	Ellis Johnson Arena (580); Morehead, KY
February 11, 2025; 5:00 pm, ESPN+		Southeast Missouri State	W 60–52	13–11 (11–4)	Jack Stephens Center (400); Little Rock, AR
February 13, 2025; 5:00 pm, ESPN+		Tennessee Tech	L 57–61	13–12 (11–5)	Jack Stephens Center; Little Rock, AR
February 20, 2025; 5:00 pm, ESPN+		Lindenwood	L 51–60	13–13 (11–6)	Jack Stephens Center; Little Rock, AR
February 22, 2025; 1:00 pm, ESPN+		Western Illinois	W 86–80	14–13 (12–6)	Jack Stephens Center; Little Rock, AR
February 27, 2025; 5:00 pm, ESPN+		at Eastern Illinois	L 44–53	14–14 (12–7)	Groniger Arena (843); Charleston, IL
March 1, 2025; 1:00 pm, ESPN+		at SIU Edwardsville	L 76–81	14–15 (12–8)	First Community Arena (1,006); Edwardsville, IL
OVC tournament
March 6, 2025; 12:30 pm, ESPN+	(4)	vs. (5) Southern Indiana; Quarterfinals	L 52–73	14–16	Ford Center; Evansville, IN
*Non-conference game. ^{#}Rankings from AP Poll. (#) Tournament seedings in parentheses. All times are in Central.
