= 2024–25 SIU Edwardsville Cougars women's basketball team =

American college basketball season

2024–25 SIU Edwardsville Cougars women's basketball
- Conference: Ohio Valley Conference
- Record: 6–23 (4–16 OVC)
- Head coach: Samantha Quigley Smith (4th season)
- Assistant coaches: Ariel Massengale; Liz Doran; Eric Gruber
- Home arena: First Community Arena

2024–25 Ohio Valley Conference women's basketball standings
	Conf.				Overall
Team	W		L	PCT	W		L	PCT
Tennessee Tech †	18	–	2	.900	26	–	6	.813
Lindenwood*	16	–	4	.800	23	–	11	.676
Eastern Illinois	15	–	5	.750	18	–	12	.600
Little Rock	12	–	8	.600	14	–	16	.467
Southern Indiana*	12	–	8	.600	23	–	13	.639
UT Martin	10	–	10	.500	13	–	19	.406
Western Illinois	8	–	12	.400	17	–	17	.500
Tennessee State	6	–	14	.300	10	–	21	.323
Morehead State	5	–	15	.250	10	–	20	.333
Southeast Missouri State	4	–	16	.200	6	–	23	.207
SIU Edwardsville	4	–	16	.200	6	–	23	.207
† 2025 OVC tournament winner * ineligible for the 2025 NCAA tournament due to transition period

The 2024–25 SIU Edwardsville Cougars women's basketball team represented Southern Illinois University Edwardsville during the 2024–25 NCAA Division I women's basketball season. The Cougars, who were led by fourth-year head coach Samantha Quigley Smith, played their home games at the First Community Arena in Edwardsville, Illinois as members of the Ohio Valley Conference.

== Previous season ==
The Cougars finished the 2023–24 season 5–26, 2–16 in OVC play, to finish in last place. They failed to qualify for the OVC tournament, as only the top eight teams qualify for the tournament.

== Preseason ==
On October 16, 2024, the OVC released their preseason coaches poll. SIU Edwardsville was picked to finish tied for eighth place in the OVC regular season.

=== Preseason rankings ===
OVC preseason poll
Predicted finish	Team	Votes (1st place)
1	Southern Indiana	200 (20)
2	UT Martin	180 (2)
3	Eastern Illinois	145
4	Tennessee Tech	140
5	Little Rock	135
6	Western Illinois	119
7	Lindenwood	81
T-8	SIU Edwardsville	61
T-8	Morehead State	61
10	Tennessee State	59
11	Southeast Missouri State	29

=== Players to Watch ===
Each OVC team selected two "Players to Watch" for their team.

Players to Watch
Player	Position	Year
KK Rodriguez	Guard	Senior
Macy Silvey	Guard	Junior

== Roster ==
2024–25 SIU Edwardsville Cougars women's basketball team
Players
Coaches

Pos.	#	Name	Height	Year	Previous school	Hometown
G	0	Kendal George	5 ft 9 in (1.75 m)	So	UT Martin	Centerville, Ohio
G	1	Ava Stoller	5 ft 6 in (1.68 m)	So	St. Petersburg High School	St. Petersburg, Florida
G	2	Kyra Williams	5 ft 6 in (1.68 m)	So	Legacy Academy	Troy, Illinois
G	4	Macy Silvey	5 ft 10 in (1.78 m)	Jr	Edwardsville High School	Glen Carbon, Illinois
G	5	Ava Gugliuzza	5 ft 5 in (1.65 m)	So	Lincoln-Way West High School	New Lenox, Illinois
G	10	Emiyah Cobb	5 ft 9 in (1.75 m)	RS Fr	Northwest High School	Clarksville, Tennessee
G	11	Meegan Fahy	5 ft 5 in (1.65 m)	Fr	Maine South High School	Park Ridge, Illinois
F	12	Rory Conboy	6 ft 0 in (1.83 m)	Fr	Lindbergh High School	St. Louis, Missouri
G	14	Molly Sheehan	5 ft 8 in (1.73 m)	Sr	Valparaiso	Hinsdale, Illinois
F	15	Halle Smith	6 ft 0 in (1.83 m)	Sr	Southeast Missouri State	Belle, Missouri
G	22	Jaiden Bryant	5 ft 9 in (1.75 m)	Jr	Missouri State	St. Louis, Missouri
F	23	Olivia Loveland	5 ft 8 in (1.73 m)	Fr	Castle View High School	Castle Rock, Colorado
G	24	Sofie Lowis	5 ft 8 in (1.73 m)	Sr	Sacred Heart-Griffin High School	Springfield, Illinois
F	25	Brianna Wooldridge	6 ft 1 in (1.85 m)	Jr	IUPUI	Elgin, Illinois
F	32	Carmen Martinez Lopez	6 ft 2 in (1.88 m)	Fr	Colegio Internacional San Fernando	Oviedo, Spain
G	33	KK Rodriguez	5 ft 6 in (1.68 m)	GS	Tulsa	St. Louis, Missouri
F	34	Alexis Warren	6 ft 1 in (1.85 m)	Fr	Pike High School	Indianapolis, Indiana

Head coach

- Samantha Quigley Smith (DePaul)

Assistant coach(es)

- Ariel Massengale (Tennessee)
- Liz Doran (Oglethorpe)
- Eric Gruber (North Central)

Legend

- (C) Team captain
- (S) Suspended
- (I) Ineligible
- (W) Walk-on
- Injured
- Current redshirt

Roster
Last update: April 25, 2025

== Schedule and results ==
Date time, TV	Rank^{#}	Opponent^{#}	Result	Record	Site (attendance) city, state
Exhibition
October 22, 2024*; 6:00 pm		Saint Louis; Charity Exhibition	L 67–76	–	First Community Arena (482); Edwardsville, IL
October 28, 2024*; 6:00 pm		Maryville	L 66–81	–	First Community Arena (431); Edwardsville, IL
Non-conference regular season
November 4, 2024*; 5:00 pm, ESPN+		UMSL	L 54–60	0–1	First Community Arena (532); Edwardsville, IL
November 7, 2024*; 6:00 pm, ESPN+		at Murray State	L 60–104	0–2	CFSB Center (1,445); Murray, KY
November 16, 2024*; 1:00 pm, ESPN+		Loyola Chicago	L 52–57	0–3	First Community Arena (669); Edwardsville, IL
November 19, 2024*; 6:00 pm, ESPN+		Roosevelt	W 73–44	1–3	First Community Arena; Edwardsville, IL
November 22, 2024*; 6:00 pm, ESPN+		at UCF	L 71–81	1–4	Addition Financial Arena (615); Orlando, FL
December 1, 2024*; 2:00 pm, Marquee		at DePaul	L 42–66	1–5	Wintrust Arena (1,118); Chicago, IL
December 4, 2024*; 11:00 am, ESPN+		at Middle Tennessee	L 41–85	1–6	Murphy Center (5,682); Murfreesboro, TN
December 8, 2024*; 1:00 pm, ESPN+		at Evansville	L 74–87	1–7	Meeks Family Fieldhouse (412); Evansville, IN
December 15, 2024*; 3:30 pm, ESPN+		Southern Illinois	W 71–59	2–7	First Community Arena (727); Edwardsville, IL
OVC regular season
December 19, 2024; 5:00 pm, ESPN+		at Little Rock	L 60–83	2–8 (0–1)	Jack Stephens Center; Little Rock, AR
December 21, 2024; 1:30 pm, ESPN+		at Southeast Missouri State	L 61–67	2–9 (0–2)	Show Me Center (635); Cape Girardeau, MO
January 2, 2025; 5:00 pm, ESPN+		Western Illinois	L 48–75	2–10 (0–3)	First Community Arena (1,331); Edwardsville, IL
January 4, 2025; 1:00 pm, ESPN+		Lindenwood	L 59–73	2–11 (0–4)	First Community Arena (882); Edwardsville, IL
January 7, 2025; 5:00 pm, ESPN+		at Eastern Illinois	L 56–69	2–12 (0–5)	Groniger Arena (342); Charleston, IL
January 11, 2025; 1:00 pm, ESPN+		Tennessee Tech	L 58–74	2–13 (0–6)	First Community Arena (981); Edwardsville, IL
January 16, 2025; 5:00 pm, ESPN+		at Tennessee State	W 76–70 ^{OT}	3–13 (1–6)	Gentry Center (713); Nashville, TN
January 18, 2025; 1:00 pm, ESPN+		at UT Martin	L 65–72	3–14 (1–7)	Skyhawk Arena (1,342); Martin, TN
January 23, 2025; 5:00 pm, ESPN+		Southern Indiana	L 65–69	3–15 (1–8)	First Community Arena (837); Edwardsville, IL
January 25, 2025; 1:00 pm, ESPN+		Morehead State	W 76–58	4–15 (2–8)	First Community Arena (899); Edwardsville, IL
January 30, 2025; 5:00 pm, ESPN+		at Lindenwood	L 70–86	4–16 (2–9)	Robert F. Hyland Arena (732); St. Charles, MO
February 1, 2025; 1:00 pm, ESPN+		at Western Illinois	L 82–94	4–17 (2–10)	Western Hall (917); Macomb, IL
February 4, 2025; 5:00 pm, ESPN+		Eastern Illinois	L 61–67 ^{OT}	4–18 (2–11)	First Community Arena (828); Edwardsville, IL
February 6, 2025; 5:30 pm, ESPN+		at Tennessee Tech	L 54–80	4–19 (2–12)	Hooper Eblen Center (935); Cookeville, TN
February 13, 2025; 5:00 pm, ESPN+		UT Martin	L 66–77	4–20 (2–13)	First Community Arena; Edwardsville, IL
February 15, 2025; 1:00 pm, ESPN+		Tennessee State	L 58–77	4–21 (2–14)	First Community Arena (927); Edwardsville, IL
February 20, 2025; 4:00 pm, ESPN+		at Morehead State	W 83–75	5–21 (3–14)	Ellis Johnson Arena (483); Morehead, KY
February 22, 2025; 5:00 pm, ESPN+		at Southern Indiana	L 42–79	5–22 (3–15)	Liberty Arena (1,521); Evansville, IN
February 27, 2025; 5:00 pm, ESPN+		Southeast Missouri State	L 66–71	5–23 (3–16)	First Community Arena (998); Edwardsville, IL
March 1, 2025; 1:00 pm, ESPN+		Little Rock	W 81–76	6–23 (4–16)	First Community Arena (1,006); Edwardsville, IL
*Non-conference game. ^{#}Rankings from AP Poll. (#) Tournament seedings in parentheses. All times are in Central.
