= 2024–25 Southern Indiana Screaming Eagles women's basketball team =

American college basketball season

2024–25 Southern Indiana Screaming Eagles women's basketball
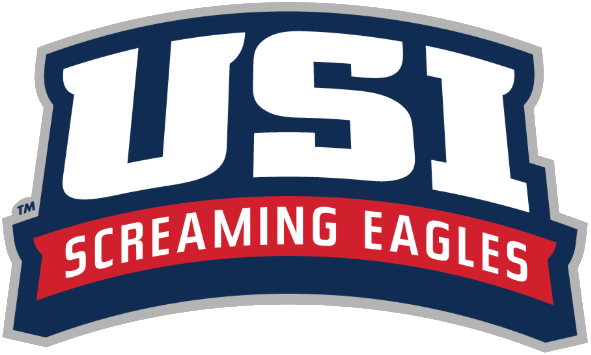

WNIT, Super 16
- Conference: Ohio Valley Conference
- Record: 23–13 (12–8 OVC)
- Head coach: Rick Stein (25th season)
- Associate head coach: Randa Gatling
- Assistant coaches: Ashley Johnson; Hailey Diestelkamp
- Home arena: Liberty Arena

2024–25 Ohio Valley Conference women's basketball standings
	Conf.				Overall
Team	W		L	PCT	W		L	PCT
Tennessee Tech †	18	–	2	.900	26	–	6	.813
Lindenwood*	16	–	4	.800	23	–	11	.676
Eastern Illinois	15	–	5	.750	18	–	12	.600
Little Rock	12	–	8	.600	14	–	16	.467
Southern Indiana*	12	–	8	.600	23	–	13	.639
UT Martin	10	–	10	.500	13	–	19	.406
Western Illinois	8	–	12	.400	17	–	17	.500
Tennessee State	6	–	14	.300	10	–	21	.323
Morehead State	5	–	15	.250	10	–	20	.333
Southeast Missouri State	4	–	16	.200	6	–	23	.207
SIU Edwardsville	4	–	16	.200	6	–	23	.207
† 2025 OVC tournament winner * ineligible for the 2025 NCAA tournament due to transition period

The 2024–25 Southern Indiana Screaming Eagles women's basketball team represented the University of Southern Indiana during the 2024–25 NCAA Division I women's basketball season. The Screaming Eagles, led by 25th-year head coach Rick Stein, played their home games at the newly renamed Liberty Arena in Evansville, Indiana as members of the Ohio Valley Conference (OVC).

This season marked Southern Indiana's third year of an original four-year transition period from Division II to Division I, with the Screaming Eagles not being eligible for NCAA postseason play until the 2026–27 season. However, on January 15, 2025, the NCAA voted to amend the reclassification timeline for transitioning Division I institutions, reducing the Division II to Division I transition period from four years to three, with Southern Indiana announcing their plans to apply to accelerate their Division I transition.

== Previous season ==
The Screaming Eagles finished the 2023–24 season 25–7, 17–1 in OVC play, to finish as OVC regular-season champions. They defeated Eastern Illinois and UT Martin to win the OVC tournament; however, they were ineligible for the NCAA tournament, due to the mandatory wait period from transitioning from DII. They received an at-large bid to the WNIT, where they defeated UIC in the first round before falling to Wisconsin in the second round.

== Preseason ==
On October 16, 2024, the OVC released their preseason coaches poll. Southern Indiana was picked to finish first in the OVC regular season.

=== Preseason rankings ===
OVC preseason poll
Predicted finish	Team	Votes (1st place)
1	Southern Indiana	200 (20)
2	UT Martin	180 (2)
3	Eastern Illinois	145
4	Tennessee Tech	140
5	Little Rock	135
6	Western Illinois	119
7	Lindenwood	81
T-8	SIU Edwardsville	61
T-8	Morehead State	61
10	Tennessee State	59
11	Southeast Missouri State	29

=== Players to Watch ===
Each OVC team selected "Players to Watch" for their team.

Players to Watch
Player	Position	Year
Vanessa Shafford	Guard	Senior
Meredith Raley	Forward	Graduate student
Madi Webb	Forward	Graduate student

== Roster ==
2024–25 Southern Indiana Screaming Eagles women's basketball team
Players
Coaches

Pos.	#	Name	Height	Year	Previous school	Hometown
G	3	Lexie Green	5 ft 10 in (1.78 m)	GS	Southport High School	Indianapolis, IN
G	4	Triniti Ralston	5 ft 5 in (1.65 m)	So	Sacred Heart Academy	Louisville, KY
G	10	Kylee Dennis	5 ft 10 in (1.78 m)	RS Fr	Sayre School	Lexington, KY
G	11	Ali Saunders	5 ft 10 in (1.78 m)	Jr	Valparaiso	Depauw, IN
G	20	Vanessa Shafford	5 ft 9 in (1.75 m)	Sr	Linton-Stockton High School	Linton, IN
F	22	Meredith Raley	6 ft 0 in (1.83 m)	GS	Gibson Southern High School	Haubstadt, IN
G	23	Lexi Sepulveda	5 ft 10 in (1.78 m)	Fr	Plainfield East High School	Bolingbrook, IL
F	24	Amiyah Buchanan	6 ft 0 in (1.83 m)	So	Southeast Missouri State	Evansville, IN
F/C	25	Madi Webb	6 ft 2 in (1.88 m)	GS	SIU Edwardsville	Bedford, IN
G/F	40	Sophia Loden	5 ft 11 in (1.8 m)	So	Mascoutah High School	Mascoutah, IL
C	44	Lauren Carie	6 ft 2 in (1.88 m)	Sr	Vincennes Rivet High School	Vincennes, IN
F/C	45	Chloe Gannon	6 ft 2 in (1.88 m)	So	Coffee County Central High School	Manchester, TN

Head coach

- Rick Stein (Southern Indiana)

Assistant coach(es)

- Randa Gatling (Southern Indiana)
- Ashley Johnson (Southern Indiana)
- Hailey Diestelkamp (Drury)

Legend

- (C) Team captain
- (S) Suspended
- (I) Ineligible
- (W) Walk-on
- Injured
- Current redshirt

Roster
Last update: April 20, 2025

== Schedule and results ==
Date time, TV	Rank^{#}	Opponent^{#}	Result	Record	Site (attendance) city, state
Non-conference regular season
November 4, 2024*; 6:00 p.m., ESPN+		Brescia	W 100–49	1–0	Liberty Arena (914); Evansville, IN
November 8, 2024*; 6:00 p.m., ACCNX		at No. 17 Louisville	L 51–75	1–1	KFC Yum! Center (7,666); Louisville, KY
November 12, 2024*; 11:00 a.m., ESPN+		at Murray State	W 82–75	2–1	CFSB Center (2,713); Murray, KY
November 15, 2024*; 6:00 p.m., ESPN+		IU Southeast	W 88–41	3–1	Liberty Arena (955); Evansville, IN
November 17, 2024*; 2:00 p.m., ESPN+		Saint Louis	W 71–59	4–1	Liberty Arena (1,009); Evansville, IN
November 23, 2024*; 3:00 p.m., ESPN+		Northern Kentucky	W 75–73	5–1	Liberty Arena (869); Evansville, IN
November 29, 2024*; 10:00 a.m.		vs. Youngstown State; Puerto Rico Clasico	W 70–34	6–1	Juan Cruz Abreu Coliseum (100); Manatí, Puerto Rico
November 30, 2024*; 9:30 a.m.		vs. Le Moyne; Puerto Rico Clasico	W 71–42	7–1	Coliseo Rubén Rodríguez (100); Bayamón, Puerto Rico
December 4, 2024*; 6:00 p.m., B1G+		at Indiana	L 63–67	7–2	Simon Skjodt Assembly Hall (10,322); Bloomington, IN
December 7, 2024*; 1:00 p.m., ESPN+		Oakland City	W 70–45	8–2	Liberty Arena (869); Evansville, IN
December 15, 2024*; 1:00 p.m., B1G+		at Illinois	L 50–73	8–3	State Farm Center (4,108); Champaign, IL
OVC regular season
December 19, 2024; 5:00 p.m., ESPN+		Tennessee State	W 74–56	9–3 (1–0)	Liberty Arena (1,012); Evansville, IN
December 21, 2024; 1:00 p.m., ESPN+		UT Martin	W 69–59	10–3 (2–0)	Liberty Arena (1,082); Evansville, IN
December 31, 2024; 5:00 p.m., ESPN+		Morehead State	W 79–65	11–3 (3–0)	Liberty Arena (1,458); Evansville, IN
January 2, 2025; 5:30 p.m., ESPN+		at Tennessee Tech	L 79–83	11–4 (3–1)	Hooper Eblen Center (1,068); Cookeville, TN
January 9, 2025; 5:15 p.m., ESPN+		at Southeast Missouri State	W 93–69	12–4 (4–1)	Show Me Center; Cape Girardeau, MO
January 11, 2025; 1:00 p.m., ESPN+		at Little Rock	Postponed		Jack Stephens Center; Little Rock, AR
January 12, 2025; 1:00 p.m., ESPN+		at Little Rock; Rescheduled from January 11	L 83–89 ^{OT}	12–5 (4–2)	Jack Stephens Center (470); Little Rock, AR
January 16, 2025; 5:00 p.m., ESPN+		Lindenwood	W 70–66	13–5 (5–2)	Liberty Arena (1,084); Evansville, IN
January 18, 2025; 1:00 p.m., ESPN+		Western Illinois	W 72–58	14–5 (6–2)	Liberty Arena (1,606); Evansville, IN
January 23, 2025; 5:00 p.m., ESPN+		at SIU Edwardsville	W 69–65	15–5 (7–2)	First Community Arena (837); Edwardsville, IL
January 25, 2025; 1:00 p.m., ESPN+		at Eastern Illinois	L 49–51	15–6 (7–3)	Groniger Arena (1,434); Charleston, IL
January 28, 2025; 4:00 p.m., ESPN+		at Morehead State	W 72–52	16–6 (8–3)	Ellis Johnson Arena (700); Morehead, KY
February 1, 2025; 1:00 p.m., ESPN+		Tennessee Tech	L 62–81	16–7 (8–4)	Liberty Arena (1,069); Evansville, IN
February 6, 2025; 5:00 p.m., ESPN+		Little Rock	L 61–75	16–8 (8–5)	Liberty Arena (943); Evansville, IN
February 8, 2025; 5:00 p.m., ESPN+		Southeast Missouri State	W 67–56	17–8 (9–5)	Liberty Arena (1,907); Evansville, IN
February 13, 2025; 5:00 p.m., ESPN+		at Western Illinois	W 76–70	18–8 (10–5)	Western Hall (387); Macomb, IL
February 15, 2025; 11:00 a.m., ESPNU/ESPN+		at Lindenwood	L 56–75	18–9 (10–6)	Robert F. Hyland Arena (1,798); St. Charles, MO
February 20, 2025; 5:00 p.m., ESPN+		Eastern Illinois	W 66–46	19–9 (11–6)	Liberty Arena (969); Evansville, IN
February 22, 2025; 5:00 p.m., ESPN+		SIU Edwardsville	W 79–42	20–9 (12–6)	Liberty Arena (1,521); Evansville, IN
February 27, 2025; 5:30 p.m., ESPN+		at UT Martin	L 69–84	20–10 (12–7)	Skyhawk Arena (1,652); Martin, TN
March 1, 2025; 1:00 p.m., ESPN+		at Tennessee State	L 64–73	20–11 (12–8)	Gentry Center; Nashville, TN
OVC tournament
March 5, 2025; 12:30 p.m., ESPN+	(5)	vs. (8) Tennessee State; First round	W 90–66	21–11	Ford Center; Evansville, IN
March 6, 2025; 12:30 p.m., ESPN+	(5)	vs. (4) Little Rock; Quarterfinals	W 73–52	22–11	Ford Center; Evansville, IN
March 7, 2025; 1:00 p.m., ESPN+	(5)	vs. (1) Tennessee Tech; Semifinals	L 78–88	22–12	Ford Center; Evansville, IN
WNIT
March 23, 2025*; 6:00 p.m., ESPN+		Campbell; Second round	W 60–51	23–12	Liberty Arena (1,705); Evansville, IN
March 27, 2025*; 6:00 p.m., ESPN+		Buffalo; Super 16	L 64–76	23–13	Liberty Arena (2,102); Evansville, IN
*Non-conference game. ^{#}Rankings from AP poll. (#) Tournament seedings in parentheses. All times are in Central.
