= 2024–25 Southeast Missouri State Redhawks women's basketball team =

American college basketball season

2024–25 Southeast Missouri State Redhawks women's basketball
- Conference: Ohio Valley Conference
- Record: 6–23 (4–16 OVC)
- Head coach: Briley Palmer (1st season)
- Assistant coaches: Mike Geary; Sam Pearson; Danielle Sanderlin; Harison Russell
- Home arena: Show Me Center

2024–25 Ohio Valley Conference women's basketball standings
	Conf.				Overall
Team	W		L	PCT	W		L	PCT
Tennessee Tech †	18	–	2	.900	26	–	6	.813
Lindenwood*	16	–	4	.800	23	–	11	.676
Eastern Illinois	15	–	5	.750	18	–	12	.600
Little Rock	12	–	8	.600	14	–	16	.467
Southern Indiana*	12	–	8	.600	23	–	13	.639
UT Martin	10	–	10	.500	13	–	19	.406
Western Illinois	8	–	12	.400	17	–	17	.500
Tennessee State	6	–	14	.300	10	–	21	.323
Morehead State	5	–	15	.250	10	–	20	.333
Southeast Missouri State	4	–	16	.200	6	–	23	.207
SIU Edwardsville	4	–	16	.200	6	–	23	.207
† 2025 OVC tournament winner * ineligible for the 2025 NCAA tournament due to transition period

The 2024–25 Southeast Missouri State Redhawks women's basketball team represented Southeast Missouri State University during the 2024–25 NCAA Division I women's basketball season. The Redhawks, who were led by first-year head coach Briley Palmer, played their home games at the Show Me Center in Cape Girardeau, Missouri as members of the Ohio Valley Conference (OVC).

The RedHawks finished the season 6–23, 4–16 in OVC play, to finish in a tie for tenth place.

== Previous season ==
The Redhawks finished the 2023–24 season 9–20, 6–12 in OVC play, to finish in ninth place. They failed to qualify for the OVC tournament, as only the top eight teams qualify for the tournament.

On May 3, 2024, head coach Rekha Patterson announced that she would be stepping down from her position after nine seasons, in order to take an assistant coaching position at UCF. On May 16, the school announced that they would be hiring Mineral Area College head coach Briley Palmer as the team's new head coach.

== Preseason ==
On October 16, 2024, the OVC released their preseason coaches poll. Southeast Missouri State was picked to finish last in the OVC regular season.

=== Preseason rankings ===
OVC preseason poll
Predicted finish	Team	Votes (1st place)
1	Southern Indiana	200 (20)
2	UT Martin	180 (2)
3	Eastern Illinois	145
4	Tennessee Tech	140
5	Little Rock	135
6	Western Illinois	119
7	Lindenwood	81
T–8	SIU Edwardsville	61
T–8	Morehead State	61
10	Tennessee State	59
11	Southeast Missouri State	29

=== Players to Watch ===
Each OVC team selected two "Players to Watch" for their team.

Players to Watch
Player	Position	Year
Indiya Bowen	Guard	Sophomore
Zoe Best	Guard	Freshman

== Roster ==
2024–25 Southeast Missouri State Redhawks women's basketball team
Players
Coaches

Pos.	#	Name	Height	Year	Previous school	Hometown
G	0	Zoe Best	5 ft 10 in (1.78 m)	Fr	Incarnate Word Academy	Bel-Nor, MO
G	1	Jariyah Williamson	5 ft 6 in (1.68 m)	Fr	Chester County High School	Hendersonville, TN
G	2	Rain Green	5 ft 8 in (1.73 m)	RS Sr	Kansas City	Baltimore, MD
G	3	Indiya Bowen	5 ft 9 in (1.75 m)	So	Horn Lake High School	Horn Lake, MS
G	4	Tristan Spearman	5 ft 4 in (1.63 m)	Fr	Memphis East High School	Memphis, TN
G	5	Brianna Hill	5 ft 11 in (1.8 m)	RS Fr	George Mason	Lansing, MI
G	10	Kennedy Claybrooks	5 ft 6 in (1.68 m)	Jr	Texas State	Memphis, TN
G	11	Lexi McCully	5 ft 6 in (1.68 m)	Sr	Georgia Southwestern	Grand Rapids, MI
G	12	Da'Kariya Jackson	6 ft 0 in (1.83 m)	Jr	Three Rivers College	Jacksonville, AR
G	15	Anjelicia Del Valle	5 ft 11 in (1.8 m)	So	Moberly Area Community College	Portage, IN
G	20	Skylar Barnes	5 ft 6 in (1.68 m)	Sr	Morehead State	St. Louis, MO
C	21	Ainaya Williams	6 ft 1 in (1.85 m)	Fr	Cardinal Ritter High School	St. Louis, MO
F	23	Briah Hampton	6 ft 1 in (1.85 m)	RS So	Austin Peay	Memphis, TN
F	32	Madison Roberts	6 ft 1 in (1.85 m)	Jr	Seminole State College	Oklahoma City, OK
G	33	Alex McGarrah	5 ft 6 in (1.68 m)	Fr	Owasso High School	Owasso, OK
G	34	Sophie Bussard	5 ft 8 in (1.73 m)	GS	Tippecanoe Valley High School	Silver Lake, IN

Head coach

- Briley Palmer (Christian Brothers)

Assistant coach(es)

- Mike Geary (Aquinas)
- Sam Pearson (Missouri Baptist)
- Danielle Sanderlin (Canisius)
- Harison Russell (Texas A&M)

Legend

- (C) Team captain
- (S) Suspended
- (I) Ineligible
- (W) Walk-on
- Injured
- Current redshirt

Roster
Last update: April 25, 2025

== Schedule and results ==
Date time, TV	Rank^{#}	Opponent^{#}	Result	Record	Site (attendance) city, state
Non-conference regular season
November 5, 2024*; 6:00 p.m., ESPN+		at Dayton	L 70–75	0–1	UD Arena (1,042); Dayton, OH
November 10, 2024*; 2:00 p.m., SECN+		at No. 4 Texas	L 47–119	0–2	Moody Center (6,878); Austin, TX
November 14, 2024*; 6:00 p.m., ESPN+		at Evansville	L 55–70	0–3	Meeks Family Fieldhouse; Evansville, IN
November 17, 2024*; 2:00 p.m., ESPN+		at Eastern Kentucky	L 61–89	0–4	Seabury Center (261); Berea, KY
November 25, 2024*; 6:30 p.m., ESPN+		Southern Illinois	W 70–58	1–4	Show Me Center (580); Cape Girardeau, MO
November 30, 2024*; 5:15 p.m., ESPN+		Indiana State	L 65–68	1–5	Show Me Center (625); Cape Girardeau, MO
December 8, 2024*; 2:00 p.m., SECN+		at Arkansas	L 45–84	1–6	Bud Walton Arena (2,609); Fayetteville, AR
December 16, 2024*; 11:00 a.m., ESPN+		Missouri State	L 49–77	1–7	Show Me Center (2,130); Cape Girardeau, MO
OVC regular season
December 19, 2024; 5:15 p.m., ESPN+		Eastern Illinois	L 55–71	1–8 (0–1)	Show Me Center (613); Cape Girardeau, MO
December 21, 2024; 1:30 p.m., ESPN+		SIU Edwardsville	W 67–61	2–8 (1–1)	Show Me Center (635); Cape Girardeau, MO
December 31, 2024*; 12:00 p.m., ESPN+		William Woods	W 102–50	3–8	Show Me Center (230); Cape Girardeau, MO
January 2, 2025; 5:00 p.m., ESPN+		at Tennessee State	W 75–68	4–8 (2–1)	Gentry Center (170); Nashville, TN
January 4, 2025; 1:00 p.m., ESPN+		at UT Martin	L 69–85	4–9 (2–2)	Skyhawk Arena (1,236); Martin, TN
January 9, 2025; 5:15 p.m., ESPN+		Southern Indiana	L 69–93	4–10 (2–3)	Show Me Center; Cape Girardeau, MO
January 11, 2025; 1:30 p.m., ESPN+		Morehead State	L 61–64	4–11 (2–4)	Show Me Center (615); Cape Girardeau, MO
January 14, 2025; 5:15 p.m., ESPN+		Little Rock	L 63–67	4–12 (2–5)	Show Me Center; Cape Girardeau, MO
January 16, 2025; 5:30 p.m., ESPN+		at Tennessee Tech	L 66–79	4–13 (2–6)	Hooper Eblen Center (977); Cookeville, TN
January 23, 2025; 5:00 p.m., ESPN+		at Lindenwood	L 76–84	4–14 (2–7)	Robert F. Hyland Arena (897); St. Charles, MO
January 25, 2025; 1:00 p.m., ESPN+		at Western Illinois	L 66–94	4–15 (2–8)	Western Hall (677); Macomb, IL
January 30, 2025; 5:15 p.m., ESPN+		UT Martin	L 54–78	4–16 (2–9)	Show Me Center (1,098); Cape Girardeau, MO
February 1, 2025; 1:30 p.m., ESPN+		Tennessee State	L 62–70	4–17 (2–10)	Show Me Center (1,012); Cape Girardeau, MO
February 6, 2025; 4:00 p.m., ESPN+		at Morehead State	L 57–63	4–18 (2–11)	Ellis Johnson Arena (870); Morehead, KY
February 8, 2025; 5:00 p.m., ESPN+		at Southern Indiana	L 56–67	4–19 (2–12)	Liberty Arena (1,907); Evansville, IN
February 11, 2025; 5:00 p.m., ESPN+		at Little Rock	L 52–60	4–20 (2–13)	Jack Stephens Center (400); Little Rock, AR
February 15, 2025; 1:30 p.m., ESPN+		Tennessee Tech	L 50–78	4–21 (2–14)	Show Me Center (482); Cape Girardeau, MO
February 20, 2025; 5:15 p.m., ESPN+		Western Illinois	W 51–49	5–21 (3–14)	Show Me Center (585); Cape Girardeau, MO
February 22, 2025; 1:30 p.m., ESPN+		Lindenwood	L 47–70	5–22 (3–15)	Show Me Center (725); Cape Girardeau, MO
February 27, 2025; 5:00 p.m., ESPN+		at SIU Edwardsville	W 71–66	6–22 (4–15)	First Community Arena (998); Edwardsville, IL
March 1, 2025; 1:00 p.m., ESPN+		at Eastern Illinois	L 52–85	6–23 (4–16)	Groniger Arena (1,434); Charleston, IL
*Non-conference game. ^{#}Rankings from AP poll. (#) Tournament seedings in parentheses. All times are in Central.
