= 2024–25 Morehead State Eagles women's basketball team =

American college basketball season

2024–25 Morehead State Eagles women's basketball
- Conference: Ohio Valley Conference
- Record: 10–20 (5–15 OVC)
- Head coach: Chris Palmer (interim)
- Assistant coaches: Vladimir Shtam; Connor Williams; London Foster; Sam Limehouse
- Home arena: Ellis Johnson Arena

2024–25 Ohio Valley Conference women's basketball standings
	Conf.				Overall
Team	W		L	PCT	W		L	PCT
Tennessee Tech †	18	–	2	.900	26	–	6	.813
Lindenwood*	16	–	4	.800	23	–	11	.676
Eastern Illinois	15	–	5	.750	18	–	12	.600
Little Rock	12	–	8	.600	14	–	16	.467
Southern Indiana*	12	–	8	.600	23	–	13	.639
UT Martin	10	–	10	.500	13	–	19	.406
Western Illinois	8	–	12	.400	17	–	17	.500
Tennessee State	6	–	14	.300	10	–	21	.323
Morehead State	5	–	15	.250	10	–	20	.333
Southeast Missouri State	4	–	16	.200	6	–	23	.207
SIU Edwardsville	4	–	16	.200	6	–	23	.207
† 2025 OVC tournament winner * ineligible for the 2025 NCAA tournament due to transition period

The 2024–25 Morehead State Eagles women's basketball team represented Morehead State University during the 2024–25 NCAA Division I women's basketball season. The Eagles, who were led by interim head coach Chris Palmer, played their home games at Ellis Johnson Arena in Morehead, Kentucky as members of the Ohio Valley Conference.

== Previous season ==
The Eagles finished the 2023–24 season 15–15, 10–8 in OVC play, to finish in a tie for fifth place. They were defeated by Tennessee State in the first round of the OVC tournament.

On October 23, 2024, it was announced that the school parted ways with head coach Cayla Petree, ending her three-year tenure with the team, with recently hired assistant coach Chris Palmer being named interim head coach for the 2024–25 season.

== Preseason ==
On October 16, 2024, the OVC released their preseason coaches poll. Morehead State was picked to finish tied for eighth in the OVC regular season.

=== Preseason rankings ===
OVC preseason poll
Predicted finish	Team	Votes (1st place)
1	Southern Indiana	200 (20)
2	UT Martin	180 (2)
3	Eastern Illinois	145
4	Tennessee Tech	140
5	Little Rock	135
6	Western Illinois	119
7	Lindenwood	81
T-8	SIU Edwardsville	61
T-8	Morehead State	61
10	Tennessee State	59
11	Southeast Missouri State	29

=== Players to Watch ===
Each OVC team selected two "Players to Watch" for their team.

Players to Watch
Player	Position	Year
Katie Novik	Guard	Sophomore
Aileen Marquez	Guard	Senior

== Roster ==
2024–25 Morehead State Eagles women's basketball team
Players
Coaches

Pos.	#	Name	Height	Year	Previous school	Hometown
F/C	0	Alyse Holliman	6 ft 0 in (1.83 m)	So	Connors State College	Marion, Arkansas
G	2	Myla Benton	5 ft 8 in (1.73 m)	Fr	Greater Atlanta Christian School	Conyers, Georgia
G	3	Alyssa Berry	5 ft 7 in (1.7 m)	RS Jr	Hill College	Pearland, Texas
G	4	Harley Paynter	5 ft 8 in (1.73 m)	GS	Tennessee Tech	Grayson, Kentucky
F	10	Michelle Ugwah	6 ft 1 in (1.85 m)	RS Fr	DME Academy	Cork, Ireland
F	11	Kuryn Brunson	5 ft 11 in (1.8 m)	Jr	Wabash Valley College	Indianapolis, Indiana
G	12	Chrishawn Coleman	5 ft 7 in (1.7 m)	Fr	Mansfield Timberview High School	Arlington, Texas
G	13	Aileen Marquez	5 ft 8 in (1.73 m)	Sr	FIU	Arden, North Carolina
F	14	Maia Rosarion	5 ft 10 in (1.78 m)	Fr	Kitsilano Secondary School	Vancouver, British Columbia
G	15	Kalise Hill	5 ft 6 in (1.68 m)	Fr	McEachern High School	Powder Springs, Georgia
F	20	Katie Dike	6 ft 3 in (1.91 m)	Sr	LCC Klaipėda	Kyiv, Ukraine
G	22	Marie Perdew	5 ft 9 in (1.75 m)	RS Fr	South Carolina State	Short Gap, West Virginia
F	23	Celeste Reed	5 ft 11 in (1.8 m)	Fr	White County High School	Sparta, Tennessee
F	25	Aaliyah Holmes	5 ft 10 in (1.78 m)	Jr	New Mexico Junior College	Austin, Texas
F	32	Veronika Korchagina	6 ft 3 in (1.91 m)	Fr	Dynamo Kursk	Moscow, Russia
G	33	Kate Novik	5 ft 9 in (1.75 m)	So	Olimpia Grodno	Grodno, Belarus
G	34	Jenna Hampton	5 ft 7 in (1.7 m)	So	Morgan County High School	West Liberty, Kentucky

Head coach

- Chris Palmer (interim) (Emmanuel)

Assistant coach(es)

- Vladimir Shtam (Lesgraft National State)
- Connor Williams (West Florida)
- London Foster (Avila)
- Sam Limehouse (Southern Wesleyan)

Legend

- (C) Team captain
- (S) Suspended
- (I) Ineligible
- (W) Walk-on
- Injured
- Current redshirt

Roster
Last update: April 22, 2025

== Schedule and results ==
Date time, TV	Rank^{#}	Opponent^{#}	Result	Record	Site (attendance) city, state
Non-conference regular season
November 4, 2024*; 5:00 pm, ESPN+		Asbury	W 92–80	1–0	Ellis Johnson Arena (475); Morehead, KY
November 7, 2024*; 9:00 pm, MWN		at New Mexico	L 56–66	1–1	The Pit (4,372); Albuquerque, NM
November 10, 2024*; 8:00 pm, ESPN+		at UTEP	L 41–68	1–2	Don Haskins Center (1,617); El Paso, TX
November 17, 2024*; 3:00 pm, ESPN+		Lipscomb	L 53–71	1–3	Ellis Johnson Arena (455); Morehead, KY
November 21, 2024*; 7:00 pm, ACCNX		at No. 25 Louisville	L 70–107	1–4	KFC Yum! Center (7,344); Louisville, KY
November 29, 2024*; 3:00 pm, ESPN+		at USC Upstate; Spartan Shootout	W 66–64	2–4	G. B. Hodge Center (152); Spartanburg, SC
November 30, 2024*; 12:00 pm		vs. Jackson State; Spartan Shootout	W 87–57	3–4	G. B. Hodge Center (117); Spartanburg, SC
December 4, 2024*; 11:00 am, ESPN+		Alice Lloyd	W 89–51	4–4	Ellis Johnson Arena (1,010); Morehead, KY
December 8, 2024*; 2:00 pm, ESPN+		Bellarmine	L 70–76	4–5	Ellis Johnson Arena (675); Morehead, KY
December 15, 2024*; 3:00 pm, ESPN+		IU Columbus	W 120–46	5–5	Ellis Johnson Arena (1,034); Morehead, KY
OVC regular season
December 19, 2024; 5:00 pm, ESPN+		UT Martin	L 63–102	5–6 (0–1)	Ellis Johnson Arena (865); Morehead, KY
December 21, 2024; 1:00 pm, ESPN+		Tennessee State	W 68–51	6–6 (1–1)	Ellis Johnson Arena (776); Morehead, KY
December 31, 2024; 6:00 pm, ESPN+		at Southern Indiana	L 65–79	6–7 (1–2)	Liberty Arena (1,458); Evansville, IN
January 4, 2025; 2:00 pm, ESPN+		at Tennessee Tech	L 63–76	6–8 (1–3)	Hooper Eblen Center (1,005); Cookeville, TN
January 9, 2025; 12:00 pm, ESPN+		at Little Rock	L 59–69	6–9 (1–4)	Jack Stephens Center (225); Little Rock, AR
January 11, 2025; 2:00 pm, ESPN+		at Southeast Missouri State	W 64–61	7–9 (2–4)	Show Me Center (615); Cape Girardeau, MO
January 16, 2025; 5:00 pm, ESPN+		Western Illinois	L 63–92	7–10 (2–5)	Ellis Johnson Arena (682); Morehead, KY
January 18, 2025; 1:00 pm, ESPN+		Lindenwood	L 51–73	7–11 (2–6)	Ellis Johnson Arena (788); Morehead, KY
January 23, 2025; 6:00 pm, ESPN+		at Eastern Illinois	L 46–100	7–12 (2–7)	Groniger Arena (936); Charleston, IL
January 25, 2025; 2:00 pm, ESPN+		at SIU Edwardsville	L 58–76	7–13 (2–8)	First Community Arena (899); Edwardsville, IL
January 28, 2025; 5:00 pm, ESPN+		Southern Indiana	L 52–72	7–14 (2–9)	Ellis Johnson Arena (700); Morehead, KY
January 30, 2025; 5:00 pm, ESPN+		Tennessee Tech	L 73–82	7–15 (2–10)	Ellis Johnson Arena (650); Morehead, KY
February 6, 2025; 5:00 pm, ESPN+		Southeast Missouri State	W 63–57	8–15 (3–10)	Ellis Johnson Arena (870); Morehead, KY
February 8, 2025; 11:00 am, ESPN+		Little Rock	L 63–66	8–16 (3–11)	Ellis Johnson Arena (580); Morehead, KY
February 13, 2025; 6:00 pm, ESPN+		at Lindenwood	L 61–68	8–17 (3–12)	Robert F. Hyland Arena (801); St. Charles, MO
February 15, 2025; 12:00 pm, ESPN+		at Western Illinois	L 73–78 ^{OT}	8–18 (3–13)	Western Hall (412); Macomb, IL
February 20, 2025; 5:00 pm, ESPN+		SIU Edwardsville	L 75–83	8–19 (3–14)	Ellis Johnson Arena (483); Morehead, KY
February 22, 2025; 1:00 pm, ESPN+		Eastern Illinois	W 62–61	9–19 (4–14)	Ellis Johnson Arena (467); Morehead, KY
February 27, 2025; 6:00 pm, ESPN+		at Tennessee State	L 61–72	9–20 (4–15)	Gentry Center (255); Nashville, TN
March 1, 2025; 2:00 pm, ESPN+		at UT Martin	W 100–77	10–20 (5–15)	Skyhawk Arena (1,445); Martin, TN
*Non-conference game. ^{#}Rankings from AP Poll. (#) Tournament seedings in parentheses. All times are in Eastern.
