= 2024–25 UT Martin Skyhawks women's basketball team =

American college basketball season

2024–25 UT Martin Skyhawks women's basketball
- Conference: Ohio Valley Conference
- Record: 13–19 (10–10 OVC)
- Head coach: Kevin McMillan (16th season)
- Associate head coach: Jasmine Newsome
- Assistant coaches: Garner Small; Maddie Spencer
- Home arena: Skyhawk Arena

2024–25 Ohio Valley Conference women's basketball standings
	Conf.				Overall
Team	W		L	PCT	W		L	PCT
Tennessee Tech †	18	–	2	.900	26	–	6	.813
Lindenwood*	16	–	4	.800	23	–	11	.676
Eastern Illinois	15	–	5	.750	18	–	12	.600
Little Rock	12	–	8	.600	14	–	16	.467
Southern Indiana*	12	–	8	.600	23	–	13	.639
UT Martin	10	–	10	.500	13	–	19	.406
Western Illinois	8	–	12	.400	17	–	17	.500
Tennessee State	6	–	14	.300	10	–	21	.323
Morehead State	5	–	15	.250	10	–	20	.333
Southeast Missouri State	4	–	16	.200	6	–	23	.207
SIU Edwardsville	4	–	16	.200	6	–	23	.207
† 2025 OVC tournament winner * ineligible for the 2025 NCAA tournament due to transition period

The 2024–25 UT Martin Skyhawks women's basketball team represented the University of Tennessee at Martin during the 2024–25 NCAA Division I women's basketball season. The Skyhawks, who were led by 16th-year head coach Kevin McMillan, played their home games at Skyhawk Arena in Martin, Tennessee as members of the Ohio Valley Conference.

== Previous season ==
The Skyhawks finished the 2023–24 season 16–17, 11–7 in OVC play, to finish in a three-way tie for second place. They defeated Tennessee Tech, Little Rock, before falling to Southern Indiana in the OVC tournament championship game. Despite the loss, the Skyhawks earned the OVC's automatic bid to the NCAA tournament, due to Southern Indiana being ineligible due to the mandatory transition period from DII. They received the #16 seed in the Albany Regional 2, where they would fall to fellow #16 seed Holy Cross in the First Four.

== Preseason ==
On October 16, 2024, the OVC released their preseason coaches poll. UT Martin was picked to finish second in the OVC regular season.

=== Preseason rankings ===
OVC preseason poll
Predicted finish	Team	Votes (1st place)
1	Southern Indiana	200 (20)
2	UT Martin	180 (2)
3	Eastern Illinois	145
4	Tennessee Tech	140
5	Little Rock	135
6	Western Illinois	119
7	Lindenwood	81
T-8	SIU Edwardsville	61
T-8	Morehead State	61
10	Tennessee State	59
11	Southeast Missouri State	29

=== Players to Watch ===
Each OVC team selected two "Players to Watch" for their team.

Players to Watch
Player	Position	Year
Anaya Brown	Forward	Junior
Kenley McCarn	Guard	Sophomore

== Roster ==
2024–25 UT Martin Skyhawks women's basketball team
Players
Coaches

Pos.	#	Name	Height	Year	Previous school	Hometown
G	1	Daejah Richmond	5 ft 8 in (1.73 m)	So	Southeast Missouri State	Cordova, Tennessee
G	2	Kaitlyn McCarn	5 ft 8 in (1.73 m)	Fr	Mountain View High School	Mountain View, Arkansas
F	4	Anaya Brown	6 ft 1 in (1.85 m)	Jr	Lafayette High School	Lexington, Kentucky
F	5	Yar Tong	6 ft 3 in (1.91 m)	Fr	Edge Prep	Calgary, Alberta
F/C	10	Tia Hymon	6 ft 2 in (1.88 m)	Sr	Lane College	Jackson, Tennessee
G	11	Shae Littleford	5 ft 7 in (1.7 m)	RS Jr	Charleston High School	Charleston, Illinois
F	12	Lexi Rubel	6 ft 1 in (1.85 m)	Jr	Notre Dame High School	Cape Girardeau, Missouri
F	14	Abby Stephens	5 ft 11 in (1.8 m)	Sr	Southeast Missouri State	Uniontown, Ohio
G	15	Morgan Borgstadt	6 ft 0 in (1.83 m)	RS Fr	Verdigris High School	Claremore, Oklahoma
G	22	Taylor Scohy	5 ft 9 in (1.75 m)	Fr	Bellbrook High School	Bellbrook, Ohio
G/F	23	Kayana Armbrister	6 ft 0 in (1.83 m)	So	Florida Atlantic	Boston, Massachusetts
F	24	Mikayla Lambert	6 ft 1 in (1.85 m)	Fr	Paragould High School	Paragould, Arkansas
F	25	Norah Clark	6 ft 1 in (1.85 m)	So	Nixa High School	Springfield, Missouri
F	32	Sophie Singleton	5 ft 10 in (1.78 m)	So	Huntingdon High School	Huntingdon, Tennessee
G	33	Mauryah Jones	5 ft 2 in (1.57 m)	Fr	Rossville Christian Academy	Rossville, Tennessee
G	44	Kenley McCarn	5 ft 11 in (1.8 m)	So	Melbourne High School	Melbourne, Arkansas

Head coach

- Kevin McMillan (Rhodes)

Assistant coach(es)

- Jasmine Newsome (UT Martin)
- Garner Small (Olivet)
- Maddie Spencer (UT Martin)

Legend

- (C) Team captain
- (S) Suspended
- (I) Ineligible
- (W) Walk-on
- Injured
- Current redshirt

Roster
Last update: April 21, 2025

== Schedule and results ==
Date time, TV	Rank^{#}	Opponent^{#}	Result	Record	Site (attendance) city, state
Exhibition
October 30, 2024*; 6:00 pm		Trevecca	W 71–40	–	Skyhawk Arena; Martin, TN
Non-conference regular season
November 4, 2024*; 6:00 pm, ESPN+		North Alabama	L 63–66	0–1	Skyhawk Arena (1,103); Martin, TN
November 7, 2024*; 5:30 pm, SECN+		at Tennessee	L 50–90	0–2	Thompson–Boling Arena (9,788); Knoxville, TN
November 12, 2024*; 6:00 pm, ESPN+		No. 18 Louisville	L 64–86	0–3	Skyhawk Arena (1,453); Martin, TN
November 16, 2024*; 7:00 pm, ESPN+		Central Arkansas	L 67–87	0–4	Skyhawk Arena (1,103); Martin, TN
November 19, 2024*; 11:00 am, ESPN+		Missouri State	W 74–66	1–4	Skyhawk Arena (2,483); Martin, TN
November 29, 2024*; 4:00 pm		vs. No. 1 UCLA; Rainbow Wahine Showdown	L 37–97	1–5	Stan Sheriff Center (1,658); Honolulu, HI
November 30, 2024*; 6:30 pm, ESPN+		at Hawai'i; Rainbow Wahine Showdown	L 39–47	1–6	Stan Sheriff Center (1,552); Honolulu, HI
December 1, 2024*; 4:00 pm		vs. Fresno State; Rainbow Wahine Showdown	L 66–75 ^{OT}	1–7	Stan Sheriff Center; Honolulu, HI
December 5, 2024*; 6:00 pm, FloHoops		at Butler	L 60–70	1–8	Hinkle Fieldhouse (677); Indianapolis, IN
December 15, 2024*; 1:00 pm, ESPN+		Arkansas State	W 82–71	2–8	Skyhawk Arena (868); Martin, TN
OVC regular season
December 19, 2024; 4:00 pm, ESPN+		at Morehead State	W 102–63	3–8 (1–0)	Ellis Johnson Arena (865); Morehead, KY
December 21, 2024; 1:00 pm, ESPN+		at Southern Indiana	L 59–69	3–9 (1–1)	Liberty Arena (1,082); Evansville, IN
December 29, 2024*; 1:00 pm, ESPN+		Fisk	W 86–38	4–9	Skyhawk Arena (1,009); Martin, TN
January 2, 2025; 5:30 pm, ESPN+		Little Rock	L 61–66	4–10 (1–2)	Skyhawk Arena (1,021); Martin, TN
January 4, 2025; 1:00 pm, ESPN+		Southeast Missouri State	W 85–69	5–10 (2–2)	Skyhawk Arena (1,236); Martin, TN
January 9, 2025; 5:00 pm, ESPN+		at Western Illinois	W 73–60	6–10 (3–2)	Western Hall (567); Macomb, IL
January 11, 2025; 1:00 pm, ESPN+		at Lindenwood	L 73–79	6–11 (3–3)	Robert F. Hyland Arena (698); St. Charles, MO
January 16, 2025; 5:30 pm, ESPN+		Eastern Illinois	L 48–51	6–12 (3–4)	Skyhawk Arena (1,411); Martin, TN
January 18, 2025; 1:00 pm, ESPN+		SIU Edwardsville	W 72–65	7–12 (4–4)	Skyhawk Arena (1,342); Martin, TN
January 21, 2025; 5:00 pm, ESPN+		at Tennessee State	L 61–77	7–13 (4–5)	Gentry Center (427); Nashville, TN
January 25, 2025; 1:00 pm, ESPN+		Tennessee Tech	L 59–70	7–14 (4–6)	Skyhawk Arena (1,297); Martin, TN
January 30, 2025; 5:15 pm, ESPN+		at Southeast Missouri State	W 78–54	8–14 (5–6)	Show Me Center (1,098); Cape Girardeau, MO
February 1, 2025; 2:00 pm, ESPN+		at Little Rock	W 64–59	9–14 (6–6)	Jack Stephens Center (600); Little Rock, AR
February 6, 2025; 5:30 pm, ESPN+		Lindenwood	L 59–62	9–15 (6–7)	Skyhawk Arena (1,274); Martin, TN
February 8, 2025; 1:00 pm, ESPN+		Western Illinois	W 75–55	10–15 (7–7)	Skyhawk Arena (1,423); Martin, TN
February 13, 2025; 5:00 pm, ESPN+		at SIU Edwardsville	W 77–66	11–15 (8–7)	First Community Arena; Edwardsville, IL
February 15, 2025; 1:00 pm, ESPN+		at Eastern Illinois	L 62–66	11–16 (8–8)	Groniger Arena (1,034); Charleston, IL
February 18, 2025; 5:30 pm, ESPN+		Tennessee State	W 73–52	12–16 (9–8)	Skyhawk Arena (642); Martin, TN
February 20, 2025; 5:30 pm, ESPN+		at Tennessee Tech	L 55–70	12–17 (9–9)	Hooper Eblen Center (1,012); Cookeville, TN
February 27, 2025; 5:30 pm, ESPN+		Southern Indiana	W 84–69	13–17 (10–9)	Skyhawk Arena (1,652); Martin, TN
March 1, 2025; 1:00 pm, ESPN+		Morehead State	L 77–100	13–18 (10–10)	Skyhawk Arena (1,445); Martin, TN
OVC tournament
March 5, 2025; 3:00 pm, ESPN+	(6)	vs. (7) Western Illinois; First Round	L 72–78	13–19	Ford Center (849); Evansville, IN
*Non-conference game. ^{#}Rankings from AP Poll. (#) Tournament seedings in parentheses. All times are in Central.
