= 2024–25 Tennessee Tech Golden Eagles women's basketball team =

American college basketball season

2024–25 Tennessee Tech Golden Eagles women's basketball

OVC regular-season and tournament champions

NCAA tournament, first round
- Conference: Ohio Valley Conference
- Record: 26–6 (18–2 OVC)
- Head coach: Kim Rosamond (9th season)
- Associate head coach: Melanie Walls
- Assistant coaches: Allison Clark; Jasmine Cincore; Kate Sherwood
- Home arena: Hooper Eblen Center

2024–25 Ohio Valley Conference women's basketball standings
	Conf.				Overall
Team	W		L	PCT	W		L	PCT
Tennessee Tech †	18	–	2	.900	26	–	6	.813
Lindenwood*	16	–	4	.800	23	–	11	.676
Eastern Illinois	15	–	5	.750	18	–	12	.600
Little Rock	12	–	8	.600	14	–	16	.467
Southern Indiana*	12	–	8	.600	23	–	13	.639
UT Martin	10	–	10	.500	13	–	19	.406
Western Illinois	8	–	12	.400	17	–	17	.500
Tennessee State	6	–	14	.300	10	–	21	.323
Morehead State	5	–	15	.250	10	–	20	.333
Southeast Missouri State	4	–	16	.200	6	–	23	.207
SIU Edwardsville	4	–	16	.200	6	–	23	.207
† 2025 OVC tournament winner * ineligible for the 2025 NCAA tournament due to transition period

The 2024–25 Tennessee Tech Golden Eagles women's basketball team represented Tennessee Technological University during the 2024–25 NCAA Division I women's basketball season. The Golden Eagles, led by ninth-year head coach Kim Rosamond, played their home games at the Hooper Eblen Center in Cookeville, Tennessee as members of the Ohio Valley Conference (OVC).

They finished the season 26–6, 18–2 in OVC play, to finish in first place. In the OVC tournament, they defeated Southern Indiana in the semifinals en route to beating Lindenwood in the championship game. In the NCAA tournament, they were eliminated in the first round by South Carolina.

== Previous season ==
The Golden Eagles finished the 2023–24 season 10–8, 13–5 in OVC play, to finish in a tie for fifth place. They defeated Western Illinois in the first round of the OVC tournament before losing in the quarterfinals to UT Martin.

== Roster ==
2024–25 Tennessee Tech Golden Eagles women's basketball team
Players
Coaches

Pos.	#	Name	Height	Year	Previous school	Hometown
F	4	Anna Walker	6 ft 0 in (1.83 m)	GS	Chattanooga	Cleveland, TN
F/C	5	Amelia Pfeiffer	6 ft 1 in (1.85 m)	Fr	Alcoa High School	Alcoa, TN
G	10	Reagan Hurst	5 ft 10 in (1.78 m)	RS Jr	Upperman High School	Baxter, TN
G	21	Chloe Larry	5 ft 8 in (1.73 m)	Fr	Parkway High School	Bossier City, LA
G	22	Peyton Carter	5 ft 8 in (1.73 m)	GS	Abingdon High School	Abingdon, VA
G	24	Keeley Carter	5 ft 8 in (1.73 m)	GS	Trevecca Nazarene	Lafayette, TN
G	25	Taris Thornton	6 ft 0 in (1.83 m)	Sr	Eastern Illinois	Chicago, IL
F/C	30	Maddy Newman	6 ft 1 in (1.85 m)	Fr	Gatlinburg-Pittman High School	Gatlinburg, TN
F	32	Megan Aulbert	6 ft 2 in (1.88 m)	RS Fr	Lutheran High School	Lake St. Louis, MO
G	33	Reghan Grimes	5 ft 10 in (1.78 m)	Jr	Ravenwood High School	Nashville, TN
G	34	Maddy Saracco	5 ft 10 in (1.78 m)	So	Southern Illinois	Bolingbrook, IL
G	44	Angelika Girgenson	5 ft 7 in (1.7 m)	Fr	Orange Lions Academy	Zwolle, Netherlands

Head coach

- Kim Rosamond (Mississippi)

Assistant coach(es)

- Melanie Walls (Georgia College)
- Allison Clark (Tennessee Tech)
- Jasmine Cincore (Nebraska)
- Kate Sherwood (Wright State)

Legend

- (C) Team captain
- (S) Suspended
- (I) Ineligible
- (W) Walk-on
- Injured
- Current redshirt

Roster
Last update: March 8, 2024

== Schedule and results ==
Date time, TV	Rank^{#}	Opponent^{#}	Result	Record	Site (attendance) city, state
Exhibition
October 29, 2024*; 5:30 p.m., ESPN+		Lipscomb	L 72–74		Hooper Eblen Center; Cookeville, TN
Non-conference regular season
November 4, 2024*; 6:00 p.m., ESPN+		Emory and Henry	W 82–54	1–0	Hooper Eblen Center (528); Cookeville, TN
November 7, 2024*; 5:00 p.m., ESPN+		at Chattanooga	W 48–46	2–0	McKenzie Arena (1,120); Chattanooga, TN
November 10, 2024*; 6:00 p.m., ESPN+		North Alabama	W 73–64	3–0	Hooper Eblen Center (546); Cookeville, TN
November 14, 2024*; 7:00 p.m., ESPN+		Jackson State	W 84–56	4–0	Hooper Eblen Center (626); Cookeville, TN
November 19, 2024*; 6:30 p.m., ESPN+		at Middle Tennessee	L 52–69	4–1	Murphy Center (3,902); Murfreesboro, TN
November 23, 2024*; 1:00 p.m., ESPN+		at East Tennessee State	L 48–53	4–2	Brooks Gymnasium (382); Johnson City, TN
November 26, 2024*; 12:00 p.m., ESPN+		at Samford	W 79–65	5–2	Pete Hanna Center (311); Homewood, AL
December 3, 2024*; 12:00 p.m., ESPN+		at Colorado	L 79–91	5–3	CU Events Center (2,734); Boulder, CO
December 6, 2024*; 11:00 a.m., ESPN+		Cumerberlands	W 82–58	6–3	Hooper Eblen Center (6,024); Cookeville, TN
Ohio Valley regular season
December 17, 2024; 5:00 p.m., ESPN+		at Western Illinois	W 72–52	7–3 (1–0)	Western Hall (423); Macomb, IL
December 19, 2024; 5:00 p.m., ESPN+		at Lindenwood	L 54–67	7–4 (1–1)	Robert F. Hyland Arena (456); St. Charles, MO
January 2, 2025; 5:30 p.m., ESPN+		Southern Indiana	W 83–79	8–4 (2–1)	Hooper Eblen Center (1,068); Cookeville, TN
January 4, 2025; 1:00 p.m., ESPN+		Morehead State	W 76–63	9–4 (3–1)	Hooper Eblen Center (1,005); Cookeville, TN
January 9, 2025; 5:00 p.m., ESPN+		at Eastern Illinois	L 40–71	9–5 (3–2)	Lantz Arena (451); Charleston, IL
January 11, 2025; 1:00 p.m., ESPN+		at SIU Edwardsville	W 75–58	10–5 (4–2)	Vadalabene Center (981); Edwardsville, IL
January 16, 2025; 5:30 p.m., ESPN+		Southeast Missouri State	W 79–66	11–5 (5–2)	Hooper Eblen Center (977); Cookeville, TN
January 18, 2025; 1:00 p.m., ESPN+		Little Rock	W 70–49	12–5 (6–2)	Hooper Eblen Center (998); Cookeville, TN
January 23, 2025; 5:00 p.m., ESPN+		at Tennessee State	W 71–64	13–5 (8–2)	Gentry Center (252); Nashville, TN
January 25, 2025; 1:00 p.m., ESPN+		at UT Martin	W 70–59	14–5 (9–2)	Skyhawk Arena (1,297); Martin, TN
January 30, 2025; 4:00 p.m., ESPN+		at Morehead State	W 82–73	15–5 (10–2)	Ellis Johnson Arena (650); Morehead, KY
February 1, 2025; 1:00 p.m., ESPN+		at Southern Indiana	W 81–62	16–5 (11–2)	Liberty Arena (1,069); Evansville, IN
February 6, 2025; 5:30 p.m., ESPN+		SIU Edwardsville	W 80–54	17–5 (11–2)	Hooper Eblen Center (935); Cookeville, TN
February 8, 2025; 1:00 p.m., ESPN+		Eastern Illinois	W 65–54	18–5 (12–2)	Hooper Eblen Center (1,147); Cookeville, TN
February 13, 2025; 5:00 p.m., ESPN+		at Little Rock	W 61–57	19–5 (13–2)	Jack Stephens Center; Little Rock, AR
February 15, 2025; 1:30 p.m., ESPN+		at Southeast Missouri State	W 78–50	20–5 (14–2)	Show Me Center (482); Cape Girardeau, MO
February 20, 2025; 5:30 p.m., ESPN+		UT Martin	W 70–55	21–5 (15–2)	Hooper Eblen Center (1,012); Cookeville, TN
February 22, 2025; 3:30 p.m., ESPN+		Tennessee State	W 84–71	22–5 (16–2)	Hooper Eblen Center (1,667); Cookeville, TN
February 27, 2025; 5:30 p.m., ESPN+		Western Illinois	W 68–51	23–5 (17–2)	Hooper Eblen Center (1,028); Cookeville, TN
March 1, 2025; 1:00 p.m., ESPN+		Lindenwood	W 77–59	24–5 (18–2)	Hooper Eblen Center (1,719); Cookeville, TN
Ohio Valley tournament
March 7, 2025; 1:00 p.m., ESPN+	(1)	vs. (5) Southern Indiana; Semifinals	W 88–78	25–5	Ford Center (1,115); Evansville, IN
March 8, 2025; 3:00 p.m., ESPN+	(1)	vs. (2) Lindenwood; Championship	W 82–76 ^{OT}	26–5	Ford Center (873); Evansville, IN
NCAA tournament
March 21, 2025*; 3:00 p.m., ESPN	(16 B2)	at (1 B2) No. 2 South Carolina; First round	L 48–108	26–6	Colonial Life Arena (11,683); Columbia, SC
*Non-conference game. ^{#}Rankings from AP poll. (#) Tournament seedings in parentheses. All times are in Central.
