= 2024–25 Eastern Illinois Panthers women's basketball team =

American college basketball season

2024–25 Eastern Illinois Panthers women's basketball
- Conference: Ohio Valley Conference
- Record: 18–12 (15–5 OVC)
- Head coach: Marqus McGlothan (interim)
- Assistant coaches: Destiny Bragman; Caitlyn Peterson; Betsy MacDonald
- Home arena: Groniger Arena

2024–25 Ohio Valley Conference women's basketball standings
	Conf.				Overall
Team	W		L	PCT	W		L	PCT
Tennessee Tech †	18	–	2	.900	26	–	6	.813
Lindenwood*	16	–	4	.800	23	–	11	.676
Eastern Illinois	15	–	5	.750	18	–	12	.600
Little Rock	12	–	8	.600	14	–	16	.467
Southern Indiana*	12	–	8	.600	23	–	13	.639
UT Martin	10	–	10	.500	13	–	19	.406
Western Illinois	8	–	12	.400	17	–	17	.500
Tennessee State	6	–	14	.300	10	–	21	.323
Morehead State	5	–	15	.250	10	–	20	.333
Southeast Missouri State	4	–	16	.200	6	–	23	.207
SIU Edwardsville	4	–	16	.200	6	–	23	.207
† 2025 OVC tournament winner * ineligible for the 2025 NCAA tournament due to transition period

The 2024–25 Eastern Illinois Panthers women's basketball team represented Eastern Illinois University during the 2024–25 NCAA Division I women's basketball season. The Panthers, who were led by interim head coach Marqus McGlothan, played their home games at Groniger Arena in Charleston, Illinois, as members of the Ohio Valley Conference.

== Previous season ==
The Panthers finished the 2023–24 season 15–18, 11–7 in OVC play, to finish in a three-way tie for second place. They would defeat Tennessee State, before falling to top-seeded and eventual tournament champions Southern Indiana in the semifinals of the OVC tournament.

On May 20, 2024, head coach Matt Bollant announced that he would be leaving the program after seven seasons, in order to retake the head coaching position at Bryan College, a position he held from 2002 to 2007, with associate head coach Marqus McGlothan being named the interim head coach for the 2024–25 season.

== Preseason ==
On October 16, 2024, the OVC released their preseason coaches poll. Eastern Illinois was picked to finish third in the OVC regular season.

=== Preseason rankings ===
OVC preseason poll
Predicted finish	Team	Votes (1st place)
1	Southern Indiana	200 (20)
2	UT Martin	180 (2)
3	Eastern Illinois	145
4	Tennessee Tech	140
5	Little Rock	135
6	Western Illinois	119
7	Lindenwood	81
T-8	SIU Edwardsville	61
T-8	Morehead State	61
10	Tennessee State	59
11	Southeast Missouri State	29

=== Players to Watch ===
Each OVC team selected two "Players to Watch" for their team.

Players to Watch
Player	Position	Year
Macy McGlone	Forward	Senior
Lalani Ellis	Guard	Sophomore

== Roster ==
2024–25 Eastern Illinois Panthers women's basketball team
Players
Coaches

Pos.	#	Name	Height	Year	Previous school	Hometown
G	0	Lalani Ellis	5 ft 8 in (1.73 m)	So	Milwaukee Academy of Science	Milwaukee, Wisconsin
F	1	Ella Lune	6 ft 0 in (1.83 m)	RS So	Brimfield High School	Brimfield, Illinois
F	2	Kennedy Davis (5Y)	6 ft 0 in (1.83 m)	Sr	Tennessee State	White Plains, Maryland
G	3	Alex Rouse	5 ft 8 in (1.73 m)	Sr	Bradley	Little Rock, Arkansas
G	4	Lyric Johnson	5 ft 9 in (1.75 m)	RS So	Hortonville High School	Hortonville, Wisconsin
F	5	Jayda Johnston (5Y)	6 ft 0 in (1.83 m)	Sr	Valparaiso	Roseville, Minnesota
G	7	Kiyley Flowers	5 ft 7 in (1.7 m)	Sr	Southeast Missouri State	Independence, Missouri
G	10	Adriana Arroyo	5 ft 9 in (1.75 m)	RS Fr	CB Alcobendas	Madrid, Spain
C	14	Ellie Colson	6 ft 1 in (1.85 m)	Sr	Summit High School	Thompson's Station, Tennessee
F	15	Georgia Cox	6 ft 4 in (1.93 m)	RS Fr	Ballarat Rush	Ballarat, Australia
G	21	Tiny Lewis	5 ft 6 in (1.68 m)	Jr	North Dakota State College of Science	St. Cloud, Minnesota
G	22	Alanna Phillipo	5 ft 9 in (1.75 m)	Fr	Marianapolis Preparatory School	Millbury, Massachusetts
F	23	Sydney-James Desroches	6 ft 0 in (1.83 m)	RS So	Rossview High School	Miami, Florida
F	30	Olivia Thostenson	6 ft 3 in (1.91 m)	Fr	International Falls High School	International Falls, Minnesota
F	33	Macy McGlone	6 ft 3 in (1.91 m)	Sr	Milwaukee	Greenville, Wisconsin

Head coach

- Marqus McGlothan (interim) (St. Cloud State)

Assistant coach(es)

- Destiny Bragman (Stephen F. Austin)
- Caitlyn Peterson (St. Cloud State)
- Betsy MacDonald (St. Cloud State)

Legend

- (C) Team captain
- (S) Suspended
- (I) Ineligible
- (W) Walk-on
- (5Y) Fifth-year senior
- Injured
- Current redshirt

Roster
Last update: April 19, 2025

== Schedule and results ==
Date time, TV	Rank^{#}	Opponent^{#}	Result	Record	Site (attendance) city, state
Exhibition
November 4, 2024*; 6:00 pm		Illinois Wesleyan	W 70–67	–	Groniger Arena (347); Charleston, IL
Non-conference regular season
November 8, 2024*; 7:00 pm, MidcoSN		at North Dakota	L 63–66	0–1	Betty Engelstad Sioux Center (1,712); Grand Forks, ND
November 10, 2024*; 2:00 pm, MidcoSN		at North Dakota State	L 56–65	0–2	Scheels Center (752); Fargo, ND
November 14, 2024*; 6:00 pm, B1G+		at No. 23 Illinois	L 37–84	0–3	State Farm Center (3,645); Champaign, IL
November 20, 2024*; 7:00 pm, B1G+		at Minnesota	L 52–81	0–4	Williams Arena (2,946); Minneapolis, MN
November 23, 2024*; 2:00 pm, ESPN+		Loyola Chicago	W 66–60	1–4	Groniger Arena (100); Charleston, IL
November 27, 2024*; 1:00 pm, ESPN+		IU Indy	W 66–49	2–4	Groniger Arena (271); Charleston, IL
December 3, 2024*; 6:30 pm, ESPN+		at No. 13 Kansas State	L 43–90	2–5	Bramlage Coliseum (3,407); Manhattan, KS
December 6, 2024*; 5:00 pm, ESPN+		Indiana State	W 73–60	3–5	Groniger Arena (505); Charleston, IL
December 15, 2024*; 5:00 pm, ESPN+		at No. 18 Iowa State	L 55–87	3–6	Hilton Coliseum (10,122); Ames, IA
OVC regular season
December 19, 2024; 5:15 pm, ESPN+		at Southeast Missouri State	W 71–55	4–6 (1–0)	Show Me Center (613); Cape Girardeau, MO
December 21, 2024; 1:00 pm, ESPN+		at Little Rock	W 59–56	5–6 (2–0)	Jack Stephens Center (593); Little Rock, AR
January 2, 2025; 5:00 pm, ESPN+		Lindenwood	W 77–65	6–6 (3–0)	Groniger Arena (456); Charleston, IL
January 4, 2025; 1:00 pm, ESPN+		Western Illinois	W 70–60	7–6 (4–0)	Groniger Arena (506); Charleston, IL
January 7, 2025; 5:00 pm, ESPN+		SIU Edwardsville	W 69–56	8–6 (5–0)	Groniger Arena (342); Charleston, IL
January 9, 2025; 5:00 pm, ESPN+		Tennessee Tech	W 71–40	9–6 (6–0)	Groniger Arena (451); Charleston, IL
January 16, 2025; 5:30 pm, ESPN+		at UT Martin	W 51–48	10–6 (7–0)	Skyhawk Arena (1,411); Martin, TN
January 18, 2025; 1:00 pm, ESPN+		at Tennessee State	W 67–54	11–6 (8–0)	Gentry Center (352); Nashville, TN
January 23, 2025; 5:00 pm, ESPN+		Morehead State	W 100–46	12–6 (9–0)	Groniger Arena (936); Charleston, IL
January 25, 2025; 1:00 pm, ESPN+		Southern Indiana	W 51–49	13–6 (10–0)	Groniger Arena (1,434); Charleston, IL
January 30, 2025; 5:00 pm, ESPN+		at Western Illinois	L 52–62	13–7 (10–1)	Western Hall (512); Macomb, IL
February 1, 2025; 1:00 pm, ESPN+		at Lindenwood	L 55–57	13–8 (10–2)	Robert F. Hyland Arena (539); St. Charles, MO
February 4, 2025; 5:00 pm, ESPN+		at SIU Edwardsville	W 67–61 ^{OT}	14–8 (11–2)	First Community Arena (828); Edwardsville, IL
February 8, 2025; 1:00 pm, ESPN+		at Tennessee Tech	L 54–65	14–9 (11–3)	Hooper Eblen Center (1,147); Cookeville, TN
February 13, 2025; 5:00 pm, ESPN+		Tennessee State	W 69–49	15–9 (12–3)	Groniger Arena (540); Charleston, IL
February 15, 2025; 1:00 pm, ESPN+		UT Martin	W 66–62	16–9 (13–3)	Groniger Arena (1,034); Charleston, IL
February 20, 2025; 5:00 pm, ESPN+		at Southern Indiana	L 46–66	16–10 (13–4)	Liberty Arena (969); Evansville, IN
February 22, 2025; 12:00 pm, ESPN+		at Morehead State	L 61–62	16–11 (13–5)	Ellis Johnson Arena (467); Morehead, KY
February 27, 2025; 5:00 pm, ESPN+		Little Rock	W 53–44	17–11 (14–5)	Groniger Arena (843); Charleston, IL
March 1, 2025; 1:00 pm, ESPN+		Southeast Missouri State	W 85–52	18–11 (15–5)	Groniger Arena (1,434); Charleston, IL
OVC tournament
March 6, 2025; 3:00 pm, ESPN+	(3)	vs. (7) Western Illinois; Quarterfinals	L 75–78	18–12	Ford Center (1,177); Evansville, IN
*Non-conference game. ^{#}Rankings from AP Poll. (#) Tournament seedings in parentheses. All times are in Central.
