= 2024–25 Lindenwood Lions women's basketball team =

American college basketball season

2024–25 Lindenwood Lions women's basketball

WNIT, Super 16
- Conference: Ohio Valley Conference
- Record: 23–11 (16–4 OVC)
- Head coach: Amy Eagan (2nd season)
- Associate head coach: Jordan Mellott
- Assistant coaches: Taylor Birch; Aaron Beadle
- Home arena: Robert F. Hyland Arena

2024–25 Ohio Valley Conference women's basketball standings
	Conf.				Overall
Team	W		L	PCT	W		L	PCT
Tennessee Tech †	18	–	2	.900	26	–	6	.813
Lindenwood*	16	–	4	.800	23	–	11	.676
Eastern Illinois	15	–	5	.750	18	–	12	.600
Little Rock	12	–	8	.600	14	–	16	.467
Southern Indiana*	12	–	8	.600	23	–	13	.639
UT Martin	10	–	10	.500	13	–	19	.406
Western Illinois	8	–	12	.400	17	–	17	.500
Tennessee State	6	–	14	.300	10	–	21	.323
Morehead State	5	–	15	.250	10	–	20	.333
Southeast Missouri State	4	–	16	.200	6	–	23	.207
SIU Edwardsville	4	–	16	.200	6	–	23	.207
† 2025 OVC tournament winner * ineligible for the 2025 NCAA tournament due to transition period

The 2024–25 Lindenwood Lions women's basketball team represented Lindenwood University during the 2024–25 NCAA Division I women's basketball season. The Lions, who were led by second-year head coach Amy Eagan, played their home games at the Robert F. Hyland Arena in St. Charles, Missouri as members of the Ohio Valley Conference (OVC).

The Lions finished the season 23–11, 16–4 in OVC play, to finish in second place. In the OVC tournament, they defeated seventh seed Western Illinois in the semifinals before falling to first-seeded Tennessee Tech in the championship game. In the WNIT, the Lions defeated Tulsa in the first round and Tarleton State in second round, before losing to Louisiana Tech in the Super 16 round.

This season marked Lindenwood's third year of an original four-year transition period from Division II to Division I, with the Lions not being eligible for NCAA postseason play until the 2026–27 season. However, on January 15, 2025, the NCAA voted to amend the reclassification timeline for transitioning Division I institutions, reducing the Division II to Division I transition period from four years to three. On February 13, 2025, the school notified the NCAA of their intention to participate in the expedited process to exit the reclassification process one year early.

== Previous season ==
The Lions finished the 2023–24 season 7–21, 5–13 in OVC play, to finish in tenth place. They failed to qualify for the OVC tournament, as only the top eight team qualify.

== Preseason ==
On October 16, 2024, the OVC released their preseason coaches poll. Lindenwood was picked to finish seventh in the OVC regular season.

=== Preseason rankings ===
OVC preseason poll
Predicted finish	Team	Votes (1st place)
1	Southern Indiana	200 (20)
2	UT Martin	180 (2)
3	Eastern Illinois	145
4	Tennessee Tech	140
5	Little Rock	135
6	Western Illinois	119
7	Lindenwood	81
T-8	SIU Edwardsville	61
T-8	Morehead State	61
10	Tennessee State	59
11	Southeast Missouri State	29

=== Players to watch ===
Each OVC team selected two "players to watch" for their team.

Players to watch
Player	Position	Year
Ellie Brueggemann	Guard	Sophomore
Brooke Coffey	Forward	Sophomore

== Roster ==
2024–25 Lindenwood Lions women's basketball team
Players
Coaches

Pos.	#	Name	Height	Year	Previous school	Hometown
G	0	Kiara Smith	5 ft 8 in (1.73 m)	Fr	Douglass High School	Midwest City, OK
G	2	Stevi Lockhart	5 ft 11 in (1.8 m)	So	Sudan High School	Sudan, TX
G	3	Gracy Wernli	5 ft 9 in (1.75 m)	So	Abilene Christian	Bixby, OK
G	4	Ellie Brueggemann	5 ft 11 in (1.8 m)	So	Lincoln Christian School	Owasso, OK
G	5	Aalayah Wilson	5 ft 8 in (1.73 m)	RS Fr	Osseo Senior High School	Maple Grove, MN
G	12	Brooke Coffey	6 ft 1 in (1.85 m)	So	Illinois State	St. Charles, MO
F	15	Alyssa Nielsen	6 ft 0 in (1.83 m)	So	Bixby High School	Bixby, OK
G	21	Mary McGrath	6 ft 1 in (1.85 m)	Sr	John Hersey High School	Arlington Heights, IL
G	22	Mya Skoff	5 ft 10 in (1.78 m)	So	Bellevue East High School	Bellevue, NE
G	24	Mykayla Cunningham	5 ft 10 in (1.78 m)	So	Spire Academy	Salina, KS
C	26	Mariah Stewart	6 ft 3 in (1.91 m)	GS	Louisiana	St. Louis, MO
F	33	Gracie Kelsey	6 ft 2 in (1.88 m)	So	East Buchanan High School	Agency, MO
C	35	Justis Odom	6 ft 2 in (1.88 m)	Sr	Texas A&M–Corpus Christi	Indianapolis, IN

Head coach

- Amy Eagan (Truman State)

Assistant coach(es)

- Jordan Mellott (Benedictine (KS))
- Taylor Birch (Drury)
- Aaron Beadle (Stephen F. Austin)

Legend

- (C) Team captain
- (S) Suspended
- (I) Ineligible
- (W) Walk-on
- Injured
- Current redshirt

Roster
Last update: April 5, 2025

== Schedule and results ==
Date time, TV	Rank^{#}	Opponent^{#}	Result	Record	Site (attendance) city, state
Non-conference regular season
November 6, 2024*; 6:30 p.m., ESPN+		at Kansas	L 43–56	0–1	Allen Fieldhouse (3,588); Lawrence, KS
November 12, 2024*; 6:00 p.m., ESPN+		Bradley	W 64–56	1–1	Robert F. Hyland Arena (407); St. Charles, MO
November 15, 2024*; 11:00 a.m., ESPN+		Harris–Stowe State	W 87–61	2–1	Robert F. Hyland Arena (1,102); St. Charles, MO
November 18, 2024*; 6:00 p.m., ESPN+		Evansville	W 71–69 ^{OT}	3–1	Robert F. Hyland Arena (472); St. Charles, MO
November 22, 2024*; 7:00 p.m., SLN		at Kansas City	W 67–62	4–1	Swinney Recreation Center (643); Kansas City, MO
November 25, 2024*; 5:00 p.m., SLN		at Oral Roberts	L 79–99	4–2	Mabee Center; Tulsa, OK
December 3, 2024*; 7:00 p.m., B1G+		at No. 25 Nebraska	L 48–69	4–3	Pinnacle Bank Arena (4,252); Lincoln, NE
December 7, 2024*; 1:00 p.m., ESPN+		Alabama A&M	L 58–61	4–4	Robert F. Hyland Arena (297); St. Charles, MO
December 14, 2024*; 1:00 p.m., ESPN+		Omaha	L 66–73	4–5	Robert F. Hyland Arena (267); St. Charles, MO
OVC regular season
December 19, 2024; 5:00 p.m., ESPN+		Tennessee Tech	W 67–54	5–5 (1–0)	Robert F. Hyland Arena (456); St. Charles, MO
December 21, 2024; 1:00 p.m., ESPN+		Western Illinois	W 63–59	6–5 (2–0)	Robert F. Hyland Arena (872); St. Charles, MO
January 2, 2025; 5:00 p.m., ESPN+		at Eastern Illinois	L 65–77	6–6 (2–1)	Groniger Arena (456); Charleston, IL
January 4, 2025; 1:00 p.m., ESPN+		at SIU Edwardsville	W 73–59	7–6 (3–1)	First Community Arena (882); Edwardsville, IL
January 9, 2025; 5:00 p.m., ESPN+		Tennessee State	W 68–54	8–6 (4–1)	Robert F. Hyland Arena (402); St. Charles, MO
January 11, 2025; 1:00 p.m., ESPN+		UT Martin	W 79–73	9–6 (5–1)	Robert F. Hyland Arena (698); St. Charles, MO
January 16, 2025; 5:00 p.m., ESPN+		at Southern Indiana	L 66–70	9–7 (5–2)	Liberty Arena (1,084); Evansville, IN
January 18, 2025; 12:00 p.m., ESPN+		at Morehead State	W 73–51	10–7 (6–2)	Ellis Johnson Arena (788); Morehead, KY
January 23, 2025; 5:00 p.m., ESPN+		Southeast Missouri State	W 84–76	11–7 (7–2)	Robert F. Hyland Arena (897); St. Charles, MO
January 25, 2025; 1:00 p.m., ESPN+		Little Rock	W 70–68	12–7 (8–2)	Robert F. Hyland Arena (453); St. Charles, MO
January 30, 2025; 5:00 p.m., ESPN+		SIU Edwardsville	W 86–70	13–7 (9–2)	Robert F. Hyland Arena (732); St. Charles, MO
February 1, 2025; 1:00 p.m., ESPN+		Eastern Illinois	W 57–55	14–7 (10–2)	Robert F. Hyland Arena (539); St. Charles, MO
February 6, 2025; 5:30 p.m., ESPN+		at UT Martin	W 62–59	15–7 (11–2)	Skyhawk Arena (1,274); Martin, TN
February 8, 2025; 1:00 p.m., ESPN+		at Tennessee State	W 81–70	16–7 (12–2)	Gentry Center (653); Nashville, TN
February 13, 2025; 5:00 p.m., ESPN+		Morehead State	W 68–61	17–7 (13–2)	Robert F. Hyland Arena (801); St. Charles, MO
February 15, 2025; 11:00 a.m., ESPNU/ESPN+		Southern Indiana	W 75–56	18–7 (14–2)	Robert F. Hyland Arena (1,798); St. Charles, MO
February 20, 2025; 5:00 p.m., ESPN+		at Little Rock	W 60–51	19–7 (15–2)	Jack Stephens Center; Little Rock, AR
February 22, 2025; 1:30 p.m., ESPN+		at Southeast Missouri State	W 70–47	20–7 (16–2)	Show Me Center (725); Cape Girardeau, MO
February 25, 2025; 5:00 p.m., ESPN+		at Western Illinois	L 70–75	20–8 (16–3)	Western Hall (814); Macomb, IL
March 1, 2025; 1:00 p.m., ESPN+		at Tennessee Tech	L 59–77	20–9 (16–4)	Hooper Eblen Center (1,719); Cookeville, TN
OVC tournament
March 7, 2025; 3:30 p.m., ESPN+	(2)	vs. (7) Western Illinois; Semifinals	W 86–75	21–9	Ford Center (1,115); Evansville, IN
March 8, 2025; 3:00 p.m., ESPN+	(2)	vs. (1) Tennessee Tech; Championship	L 76–82	21–10	Ford Center (873); Evansville, IN
WNIT
March 20, 2025*; 7:00 p.m., ESPN+		Tulsa; First round	W 76–60	22–10	Robert F. Hyland Arena (506); St. Charles, MO
March 23, 2025*; 2:00 p.m., ESPN+		at Tarleton State; Second round	W 67–59	23–10	Wisdom Gym (1,326); Stephenville, TX
March 26, 2025*; 6:30 p.m., ESPN+		at Louisiana Tech; Super 16	L 64–68	23–11	Thomas Assembly Center (681); Ruston, LA
*Non-conference game. ^{#}Rankings from AP poll. (#) Tournament seedings in parentheses. All times are in Central.
