= 2024–25 Tennessee State Lady Tigers basketball team =

American college basketball season

2024–25 Tennessee State Lady Tigers basketball
- Conference: Ohio Valley Conference
- Record: 10–21 (6–14 OVC)
- Head coach: Candice Dupree (1st season)
- Assistant coaches: Lady Comfort; Treasure Hunt
- Home arena: Gentry Center

2024–25 Ohio Valley Conference women's basketball standings
	Conf.				Overall
Team	W		L	PCT	W		L	PCT
Tennessee Tech †	18	–	2	.900	26	–	6	.813
Lindenwood*	16	–	4	.800	23	–	11	.676
Eastern Illinois	15	–	5	.750	18	–	12	.600
Little Rock	12	–	8	.600	14	–	16	.467
Southern Indiana*	12	–	8	.600	23	–	13	.639
UT Martin	10	–	10	.500	13	–	19	.406
Western Illinois	8	–	12	.400	17	–	17	.500
Tennessee State	6	–	14	.300	10	–	21	.323
Morehead State	5	–	15	.250	10	–	20	.333
Southeast Missouri State	4	–	16	.200	6	–	23	.207
SIU Edwardsville	4	–	16	.200	6	–	23	.207
† 2025 OVC tournament winner * ineligible for the 2025 NCAA tournament due to transition period

The 2024–25 Tennessee State Lady Tigers basketball team represented Tennessee State University during the 2024–25 NCAA Division I women's basketball season. The Lady Tigers, who were led by first-year head coach Candice Dupree, played their home games at the Gentry Center in Nashville, Tennessee, as members of the Ohio Valley Conference.

== Previous season ==
The Lady Tigers finished the 2023–24 season 11–19, 7–11 in OVC play, to finish in eighth place. They defeated Morehead State, before falling to Eastern Illinois in the quarterfinals of the OVC tournament.

On April 3, 2024, head coach Ty Evans announced his resignation, ending his four year tenure with the team. On May 9, former WNBA star and San Antonio Spurs player development coach Candice Dupree was named the team's new head coach.

== Preseason ==
On October 16, 2024, the OVC released their preseason coaches poll. Tennessee State was picked to finish tenth in the OVC regular season.

=== Preseason rankings ===
OVC preseason poll
Predicted finish	Team	Votes (1st place)
1	Southern Indiana	200 (20)
2	UT Martin	180 (2)
3	Eastern Illinois	145
4	Tennessee Tech	140
5	Little Rock	135
6	Western Illinois	119
7	Lindenwood	81
T-8	SIU Edwardsville	61
T-8	Morehead State	61
10	Tennessee State	59
11	Southeast Missouri State	29

=== Players to Watch ===
Each OVC team selected two "Players to Watch" for their team.

Players to Watch
Player	Position	Year
Sanaa' St. Andre	Guard	Graduate student
XaiOnna Whitfield	Guard	Freshman

== Roster ==
2024–25 Tennessee State Lady Tigers women's basketball team
Players
Coaches

Pos.	#	Name	Height	Year	Previous school	Hometown
G	0	Aaniya Webb	5 ft 11 in (1.8 m)	Jr	St. Bonaventure	Omaha, Nebraska
G	1	XaiOnna Whitfield	5 ft 8 in (1.73 m)	Fr	Oxford High School	Oxford, Alabama
G	2	Somah Kamara	5 ft 10 in (1.78 m)	Fr	Robbinsdale Cooper High School	Brooklyn Center, Minnesota
F	3	Kiki Roberts	5 ft 11 in (1.8 m)	Jr	Cal State Monterey Bay	Fairfield, California
G	4	Angel Hill	5 ft 9 in (1.75 m)	Fr	Minnehaha Academy	Minneapolis, Minnesota
G	5	Genesis Harris	5 ft 5 in (1.65 m)	Fr	Beech High School	Hendersonville, Tennessee
G	10	Saniah Parker	5 ft 9 in (1.75 m)	Sr	Mae Jemison High School	Huntsville, Alabama
G	20	Sanaa' St. Andre	5 ft 8 in (1.73 m)	GS	Kansas City	Oakdale, Louisiana
G	21	Krystal Haddock	5 ft 10 in (1.78 m)	Fr	Good-Better-Best Academy	Greenville, North Carolina
G	22	Erin Martin	5 ft 11 in (1.8 m)	Fr	Brewbaker Tech Magnet High School	Montgomery, Alabama
F	23	Jada Collins	6 ft 2 in (1.88 m)	Fr	Kalamazoo Central High School	Kalamazoo, Michigan
F	24	Lyric Cole	6 ft 0 in (1.83 m)	Sr	Austin Peay	Memphis, Tennessee

Head coach

- Candice Dupree (Temple)

Assistant coach(es)

- Lady Comfort (Temple)
- Treasure Hunt (Arizona State)

Legend

- (C) Team captain
- (S) Suspended
- (I) Ineligible
- (W) Walk-on
- Injured
- Current redshirt

Roster
Last update: April 21, 2025

== Schedule and results ==
Date time, TV	Rank^{#}	Opponent^{#}	Result	Record	Site (attendance) city, state
Non-conference regular season
November 4, 2024*; 5:00 pm, ESPN+		Cumberland	W 72–62	1–0	Gentry Center; Nashville, TN
November 8, 2024*; 6:00 pm, ESPN+		at Eastern Kentucky	W 66–48	2–0	Seabury Center (211); Berea, KY
November 11, 2024*; 6:00 pm, ESPN+		at Lipscomb	L 61–83	2–1	Allen Arena (225); Nashville, TN
November 15, 2024*; 10:00 am, ESPN+		at Wright State	L 65–77	2–2	Nutter Center (5,912); Fairborn, OH
November 17, 2024*; 12:00 pm, ESPN+		at Dayton	L 58–76	2–3	UD Arena (1,902); Dayton, OH
November 22, 2024*; 7:00 pm		Akron	W 72–68	3–3	Gentry Center (98); Nashville, TN
November 27, 2024*; 4:00 pm, ESPN+		at Western Kentucky	L 62–92	3–4	E. A. Diddle Arena (721); Bowling Green, KY
November 30, 2024*; 3:00 pm, ESPN+		UNC Asheville	W 92–87 ^{OT}	4–4	Gentry Center (75); Nashville, TN
December 4, 2024*; 11:00 am, ESPN+		at North Texas	L 65–83	4–5	The Super Pit (2,242); Denton, TX
December 8, 2024*; 1:00 pm, SECN		at No. 18 Ole Miss	L 38–85	4–6	SJB Pavilion (2,625); Oxford, MS
OVC regular season
December 19, 2024; 5:00 pm, ESPN+		at Southern Indiana	L 56–74	4–7 (0–1)	Liberty Arena (1,012); Evansville, IN
December 21, 2024; 12:00 pm, ESPN+		at Morehead State	L 51–68	4–8 (0–2)	Ellis Johnson Arena (776); Morehead, KY
January 2, 2025; 5:00 pm, ESPN+		Southeast Missouri State	L 68–75	4–9 (0–3)	Gentry Center (170); Nashville, TN
January 4, 2025; 1:00 pm, ESPN+		Little Rock	L 63–67	4–10 (0–4)	Gentry Center (174); Nashville, TN
January 9, 2025; 5:00 pm, ESPN+		at Lindenwood	L 54–68	4–11 (0–5)	Robert F. Hyland Arena (402); St. Charles, MO
January 11, 2025; 1:00 pm, ESPN+		at Western Illinois	L 67–88	4–12 (0–6)	Western Hall (603); Macomb, IL
January 16, 2025; 5:00 pm, ESPN+		SIU Edwardsville	L 70–76 ^{OT}	4–13 (0–7)	Gentry Center (713); Nashville, TN
January 18, 2025; 1:00 pm, ESPN+		Eastern Illinois	L 54–67	4–14 (0–8)	Gentry Center (352); Nashville, TN
January 21, 2025; 5:00 pm, ESPN+		UT Martin	W 77–61	5–14 (1–8)	Gentry Center (427); Nashville, TN
January 23, 2025; 5:00 pm, ESPN+		Tennessee Tech	L 64–71	5–15 (1–9)	Gentry Center (252); Nashville, TN
January 30, 2025; 5:00 pm, ESPN+		at Little Rock	L 60–67	5–16 (1–10)	Jack Stephens Center (450); Little Rock, AR
February 1, 2025; 1:30 pm, ESPN+		at Southeast Missouri State	W 70–62	6–16 (2–10)	Show Me Center (1,012); Cape Girardeau, MO
February 6, 2025; 11:00 am, ESPN+		Western Illinois	W 70–66	7–16 (3–10)	Gentry Center (1,763); Nashville, TN
February 8, 2025; 1:00 pm, ESPN+		Lindenwood	L 70–81	7–17 (3–11)	Gentry Center (653); Nashville, TN
February 13, 2025; 5:00 pm, ESPN+		at Eastern Illinois	L 49–69	7–18 (3–12)	Groniger Arena (540); Charleston, IL
February 15, 2025; 1:00 pm, ESPN+		at SIU Edwardsville	W 77–58	8–18 (4–12)	First Community Arena (927); Edwardsville, IL
February 18, 2025; 5:30 pm, ESPN+		at UT Martin	L 52–73	8–19 (4–13)	Skyhawk Arena (642); Martin, TN
February 22, 2025; 3:30 pm, ESPN+		at Tennessee Tech	L 71–84	8–20 (4–14)	Hooper Eblen Center (1,667); Cookeville, TN
February 27, 2025; 5:00 pm, ESPN+		Morehead State	W 72–61	9–20 (5–14)	Gentry Center (255); Nashville, TN
March 1, 2025; 1:00 pm, ESPN+		Southern Indiana	W 73–64	10–20 (6–14)	Gentry Center; Nashville, TN
OVC tournament
March 5, 2025; 12:30 pm, ESPN+	(8)	vs. (5) Southern Indiana; First Round	L 66–90	10–21	Ford Center; Evansville, IN
*Non-conference game. ^{#}Rankings from AP Poll. (#) Tournament seedings in parentheses. All times are in Central.
