= 2025 Ohio Valley Conference women's basketball tournament =

- Classification: Division I
- Season: 2024–25
- Teams: 8
- Site: Ford Center; Evansville, Indiana
- Champions: Tennessee Tech (11th title)
- Winning coach: Kim Rosamond (2nd title)
- MVP: Keeley Carter (Tennessee Tech)
- Television: ESPN+

2024–25 Ohio Valley Conference women's basketball standings
| | Conf. | | | | Overall |
| Team | W | | L | PCT | W | | L | PCT |
|---|---|---|---|---|---|---|---|---|
| Tennessee Tech † | 18 | – | 2 | .900 | 26 | – | 6 | .813 |
| Lindenwood* | 16 | – | 4 | .800 | 23 | – | 11 | .676 |
| Eastern Illinois | 15 | – | 5 | .750 | 18 | – | 12 | .600 |
| Little Rock | 12 | – | 8 | .600 | 14 | – | 16 | .467 |
| Southern Indiana* | 12 | – | 8 | .600 | 23 | – | 13 | .639 |
| UT Martin | 10 | – | 10 | .500 | 13 | – | 19 | .406 |
| Western Illinois | 8 | – | 12 | .400 | 17 | – | 17 | .500 |
| Tennessee State | 6 | – | 14 | .300 | 10 | – | 21 | .323 |
| Morehead State | 5 | – | 15 | .250 | 10 | – | 20 | .333 |
| Southeast Missouri State | 4 | – | 16 | .200 | 6 | – | 23 | .207 |
| SIU Edwardsville | 4 | – | 16 | .200 | 6 | – | 23 | .207 |
† 2025 OVC tournament winner * ineligible for the 2025 NCAA tournament due to transition period

The 2025 Ohio Valley Conference Women's Basketball Tournament was the final event of the 2024–25 NCAA Division I women's basketball season in the Ohio Valley Conference. The tournament was held March 5–8, 2025 at the Ford Center in Evansville, Indiana. The tournament winner will received the conference's automatic bid to the 2025 NCAA Division I women's basketball tournament.

== Seeds ==
Only the top eight teams in the conference qualified for the tournament. Teams were seeded by record within the conference, with a tiebreaker system to seed teams with identical conference records.

| Seed | School | Conference | Tiebreaker |
|---|---|---|---|
| 1 | Tennessee Tech | 18–2 | |
| 2 | Lindenwood | 16–4 | |
| 3 | Eastern Illinois | 15–5 | |
| 4 | Little Rock | 12–8 | 2–0 vs. Southern Indiana |
| 5 | Southern Indiana | 12–8 | 0–2 vs. Little Rock |
| 6 | UT Martin | 10–10 | |
| 7 | Western Illinois | 8–12 | |
| 8 | Tennessee State | 6–14 | |
| DNQ | Morehead State | 5–15 | |
| DNQ | Southeast Missouri State | 4–16 | 2–0 vs. SIU Edwardsville |
| DNQ | SIU Edwardsville | 4–16 | 0–2 vs. Southeast Missouri State |

== Schedule ==
| Game | Time | Matchup | Score | Television |
First Round – Wednesday, March 5
| 1 | 12:30 pm | No. 5 Southern Indiana vs. No. 8 Tennessee State | 90–66 | ESPN+ |
| 2 | 3:00 pm | No. 6 UT Martin vs. No. 7 Western Illinois | 72–78 | ESPN+ |
Quarterfinals – Thursday, March 6
| 3 | 12:30 pm | No. 4 Little Rock vs. No. 5 Southern Indiana | 52–73 | ESPN+ |
| 4 | 3:00 pm | No. 3 Eastern Illinois vs. No. 7 Western Illinois | 75–78 | ESPN+ |
Semifinals – Friday, March 7
| 5 | 1:00 pm | No. 1 Tennessee Tech vs. No. 5 Southern Indiana | 88–78 | ESPN+ |
| 6 | 3:30 pm | No. 2 Lindenwood vs. No. 7 Western Illinois | 86–75 | ESPN+ |
Championship – Saturday, March 8
| 7 | 3:00 pm | No. 1 Tennessee Tech vs. No. 2 Lindenwood | 82–76^{OT} | ESPN+ |
All game times in CST.

== Bracket ==
First Round; Wednesday, March 5
5 | Southern Indiana | 90
8 | Tennessee State | 66
6 | UT Martin | 72
7 | Western Illinois | 78

Quarterfinals; Thursday, March 6
4 | Little Rock | 52
5 | Southern Indiana | 73
3 | Eastern Illinois | 75
7 | Western Illinois | 78

Semifinals; Friday, March 7
1 | Tennessee Tech | 88
5 | Southern Indiana | 78
2 | Lindenwood | 86
7 | Western Illinois | 75

Championship; Saturday, March 8
1 | Tennessee Tech | 82*
2 | Lindenwood | 76
