= 2024–25 Louisville Cardinals women's basketball team =

Intercollegiate basketball season

2024–25 Louisville Cardinals women's basketball

NCAA tournament, Second Round
- Conference: Atlantic Coast Conference
- Record: 22–11 (13–5 ACC)
- Head coach: Jeff Walz (18th season)
- Associate head coach: Stephanie Norman (18th season)
- Assistant coaches: Jonneshia Pineda (6th season); Shay Robinson (3rd season); Amanda Butler (1st season)
- Home arena: KFC Yum! Center

2024–25 ACC women's basketball standings
	Conf.				Overall
Team	W		L	PCT	W		L	PCT
No. 9 NC State	16	–	2	.889	28	–	7	.800
No. 8 Notre Dame	16	–	2	.889	28	–	6	.824
No. 7 Duke †	14	–	4	.778	29	–	8	.784
No. 22 Florida State	13	–	5	.722	24	–	9	.727
No. 12 North Carolina	13	–	5	.722	29	–	8	.784
Louisville	13	–	5	.722	22	–	11	.667
California	12	–	6	.667	25	–	9	.735
Virginia Tech	9	–	9	.500	19	–	13	.594
Georgia Tech	9	–	9	.500	22	–	11	.667
Virginia	8	–	10	.444	17	–	15	.531
Stanford	8	–	10	.444	16	–	15	.516
Boston College	6	–	12	.333	16	–	18	.471
Syracuse	6	–	12	.333	12	–	18	.400
Clemson	6	–	12	.333	14	–	17	.452
Pittsburgh	5	–	13	.278	13	–	19	.406
Miami (FL)	4	–	14	.222	14	–	15	.483
Wake Forest	2	–	16	.111	9	–	20	.310
SMU	2	–	16	.111	10	–	20	.333
† 2025 ACC tournament winner Rankings from AP Poll

The 2024–25 Louisville Cardinals women's basketball team represented the University of Louisville during the 2024–25 NCAA Division I women's basketball season. The Cardinals were led by eighteenth-year head coach Jeff Walz, and played their home games at the KFC Yum! Center in Louisville, Kentucky. This season was their eleventh year competing in the Atlantic Coast Conference.

The Cardinals beagan the season ranked seventeenth in the AP poll and traveled to France to play fifth-ranked UCLA in the Aflac Oui-Play event. The Cardinals lost the game 66–59. They won two games before losing to rival and twentieth-ranked Kentucky 71–61 in overtime. The Cardinals dropped to number twenty five in the polls before winning three straight games to bounce back up to twenty second. They lost in the ACC–SEC Challenge to eleventh-ranked Oklahoma 78–72. They followed that game with a 85–52 loss to second-ranked Connecticut in the Women's Champions Classic. They won one game before losing their ACC opener, and the Jimmy V Classic to twenty second-ranked NC State 72–42. The Cardinals' inconsistency improved after that as they went on a seven-game winning streak. The streak included an overtime win over Wake Forest and a 69–60 win over thirteenth ranked Georgia Tech. The streak was ended with a 70–65 loss at Virginia Tech. The Cardinals went 6–1 over their next seven games, with the only loss being a 89–71 defeat against number three Notre Dame. During this stretch they defeated three ranked team: number twenty one California, number twenty three Florida State and number eleven Duke. They faced two ranked teams in their final three games, and lost to both. They lost 79–75 to ninth-ranked North Carolina and 72–59 in a rematch against number three Notre Dame. They moved to twenty fifth in the rankings after the North Carolina loss, but dropped out in the first post-season ranking.

The Cardinals finished the season 22–11 overall and 13–5 in ACC play to finish in a three-way tie for fourth place. As the sixth seed in the ACC tournament, earned a bye into the second round where they defeated Clemson 70–68 in overtime. They lost to eleventh ranked and third seed Duke 61–48 in the Quarterfinals. They received an at-large invitation to the NCAA tournament and were the seven-seed in the Birmingham 3 region. They defeated ten seed Nebraska in the First Round before losing to second seed and sixth ranked TCU 85–70 in the Second Round to end their season.

== Previous season ==
The Cardinals finished the season 24–10 overall and 12–6 in ACC play to finish in a tie for fifth place. As the fifth seed in the ACC tournament, they defeated thirteenth seed Boston College in the Second Round before losing to fourth seed and eventual champion Notre Dame in the Quarterfinals. They received an at-large invitation to the NCAA Tournament, marking the thirteenth straight time the Cardinals qualified for the tournament. As the sixth seed in the Albany 2 they were upset by eleventh seed Middle Tennessee in the First Round to end their season.

== Off-season ==
=== Departures ===
Departures
Name	Number	Pos.	Height	Year	Hometown	Reason for departure
Sydney Taylor	1	G	5'9"	Graduate Student	Long Island, New York	Graduated
Hennie van Schaik	3	F	6'3"	Junior	Urk, Netherlands	Transferred to San Jose State
Kiki Jefferson	12	G	6'1"	Graduate Student	Lancaster, Pennsylvania	Graduated; drafted 31st overall in the 2024 WNBA draft
Nina Rickards	15	G	5'9"	Graduate Student	Queens, New York	Graduated
Alexia Mobley	23	F	6'2"	(redshirt) Sophomore	Reynoldsburg, Ohio	Transferred to Florida
Eylia Love	24	G	6'1"	Senior	Kansas City, Kansas	Transferred to Houston

=== Incoming transfers ===
Incoming transfers
Name	Number	Pos.	Height	Year	Hometown	Previous School
Ja'Leah Williams	12	G	5'9"	Senior	Pompano Beach, Florida	Miami (FL)

=== Recruiting class ===
College recruiting
Name	Hometown	School	Height	Weight	Commit date
Izela Arenas; G	Porter Ranch, California	Sierra Canyon	5 ft 9 in (1.75 m)	N/A	Oct 21, 2023
Izela Arenas; G	Recruit ratings: ESPN: (92)				
Reagan Bender; G	Louisville, Kentucky	Sacred Heart	5 ft 10 in (1.78 m)	N/A	Apr 24, 2024
Reagan Bender; G	Recruit ratings: ESPN: (NR)				
Imari Berry; G	Clarksville, Tennessee	Clarksville	5 ft 10 in (1.78 m)	N/A	Apr 23, 2024
Imari Berry; G	Recruit ratings: ESPN: (96)				
Anaya Hardy; F	Detroit, Michigan	Renaissance	6 ft 3 in (1.91 m)	N/A	Jul 18, 2023
Anaya Hardy; F	Recruit ratings: ESPN: (NR)				
Isla Juffermans; F	Coffs Harbour, Australia	Centre of Excellence Australia	6 ft 4 in (1.93 m)	N/A	Sep 28, 2023
Isla Juffermans; F	Recruit ratings: ESPN: (NR)				
Mackenly Randolph; F	Los Angeles, California	Sierra Canyon	6 ft 0 in (1.83 m)	N/A	Apr 19, 2024
Mackenly Randolph; F	Recruit ratings: ESPN: (96)				
Tajianna Roberts; G	San Diego, California	IMG Academy	5 ft 10 in (1.78 m)	N/A	Oct 11, 2023
Tajianna Roberts; G	Recruit ratings: ESPN: (96)				
Overall recruit ranking:
Note: In many cases, Scout, Rivals, 247Sports, On3, and ESPN may conflict in their listings of height and weight.; In these cases, the average was taken. ESPN grades are on a 100-point scale.; Sources:

== Roster ==
2024–25 Louisville Cardinals women's basketball team
Players
Coaches

Pos.	#	Name	Height	Year	Previous school	Hometown
G	0	Izela Arenas	5 ft 9 in (1.75 m)	Fr	Sierra Canyon	Porter Ranch, CA
G	1	Imani Berry	5 ft 10 in (1.78 m)	Fr	Clarksville	Clarksville, TN
F	2	Nyla Harris	6 ft 2 in (1.88 m)	Jr	Lake Highland Prep	Winermere, FL
F	4	Mackenly Randolph	6 ft 0 in (1.83 m)	Fr	Sierra Canyon	Los Angeles, CA
F	9	Anaya Hardy	6 ft 3 in (1.91 m)	Fr	Renaissance	Detroit, MI
C	10	Eseosa Imafidon	6 ft 5 in (1.96 m)	RS Fr	Proctor Academy	Benin City, Nigeria
F	11	Elif İstanbulluoğlu	6 ft 3 in (1.91 m)	So	Fenerbahçe S.K.	Istanbul, Turkey
G	12	Ja'Leah Williams	5 ft 9 in (1.75 m)	Jr	Blanche Ely; Miami (FL)	Pompano Beach, FL
G	13	Merissah Russell	6 ft 0 in (1.83 m)	GS	Cairine Wilson	Ottawa, Ontario
F	15	Isla Juffermans	6 ft 4 in (1.93 m)	Fr	Centre of Excellence Australia	Coffs Harbour, Australia
G	21	Reagan Bender	5 ft 10 in (1.78 m)	Fr	Sacred Heart	Louisville, KY
G	22	Tajianna Roberts	5 ft 10 in (1.78 m)	Fr	IMG Academy	San Diego, CA
G	30	Jayda Curry	5 ft 6 in (1.68 m)	Sr	Centennial; California	Corona, CA
F	44	Olivia Cochran	6 ft 3 in (1.91 m)	GS	Carver	Columbus, GA

Head coach

- Jeff Walz (Northern Kentucky)

Assistant coach(es)

- Stephanie Norman (Arizona State)
- Jonneshia Pineda (Georgia Southwestern State)
- Shay Robinson (Central Florida)
- Amanda Butler (Florida)

Legend

- (C) Team captain
- (S) Suspended
- (I) Ineligible
- (W) Walk-on
- Injured
- Current redshirt

Roster
Last update: August 22, 2024

== Schedule and results ==
Date time, TV	Rank^{#}	Opponent^{#}	Result	Record	High points	High rebounds	High assists	Site (attendance) city, state
Regular season
November 4, 2024*; 2:30 p.m., ESPN2	No. 17	vs. No. 5 UCLA; Aflac Oui-Play	L 59–66	0–1	21 – Roberts	7 – Williams	9 – Williams	Adidas Arena (3,472); Paris, France
November 8, 2024*; 7:00 p.m., ACCNX/ESPN+	No. 17	Southern Indiana	W 75–51	1–1	15 – Cochran	8 – Berry	4 – Tied	KFC Yum! Center (7,666); Louisville, KY
November 12, 2024*; 7:00 p.m., ESPN+	No. 18	at UT Martin	W 86–64	2–1	16 – Harris	9 – Berry	4 – Arenas	Skyhawk Arena (1,453); Martin, TN
November 16, 2024*; 6:00 p.m., SECN+/ESPN+	No. 18	at No. 20 Kentucky; Rivalry	L 61–71 ^{OT}	2–2	14 – Berry	6 – Cochran	6 – Williams	Rupp Arena (6,117); Lexington, KY
November 21, 2024*; 7:00 p.m., ACCNX/ESPN+	No. 25	Morehead State	W 107–70	3–2	21 – Berry	6 – Tied	8 – Williams	KFC Yum! Center (7,344); Louisville, KY
November 24, 2024*; 1:00 p.m., Peacock	No. 25	vs. South Florida; WBCA Showcase	W 64–60	4–2	13 – Tied	9 – Tied	7 – Williams	ESPN Wide World of Sports (1,310); Orlando, FL
November 30, 2024*; 3:00 p.m., ESPN+	No. 24	at Colorado	W 79–71	5–2	14 – Tied	4 – Harris	3 – Curry	CU Events Center (3,487); Boulder, CO
December 4, 2024*; 5:00 p.m., ESPN2	No. 22	No. 11 Oklahoma; ACC–SEC Challenge	L 72–78	5–3	17 – Cochran	9 – Cochran	3 – Roberts	KFC Yum! Center (7,446); Louisville, KY
December 7, 2024*; 9:30 p.m., FOX	No. 22	vs. No. 2 Connecticut; Women's Champions Classic	L 52–85	5–4	10 – Berry	6 – Williams	3 – Roberts	Barclays Center (9,114); Brooklyn, NY
December 12, 2024*; 7:00 p.m., ACCNX/ESPN+		Grambling State	W 96–57	6–4	18 – Cochran	11 – Cochran	4 – Tied	KFC Yum! Center (7,395); Louisville, KY
December 15, 2024; 1:00 p.m., ABC		No. 22 NC State; Jimmy V Classic	L 42–72	6–5 (0–1)	8 – Tied	8 – Harris	2 – Curry	KFC Yum! Center (9,116); Louisville, KY
December 21, 2024*; 5:00 p.m., ESPNU		at Memphis	W 87–68	7–5	23 – Roberts	13 – Cochran	7 – Williams	FedExForum (2,021); Memphis, TN
December 29, 2024; 2:00 p.m., ACCN		at Boston College	W 86–73	8–5 (1–1)	14 – Curry	7 – Cochran	4 – Tied	Conte Forum (1,138); Chestnut Hill, MA
January 2, 2025; 7:00 p.m., ACCNX/ESPN+		Miami (FL)	W 74–56	9–5 (2–1)	21 – Curry	7 – Williams	7 – Williams	KFC Yum! Center (7,956); Louisville, KY
January 5, 2025; 4:00 p.m., ACCN		at Wake Forest	W 81–76 ^{OT}	10–5 (3–1)	18 – Harris	7 – Cochran	4 – Tied	LJVM Coliseum (1,019); Winston-Salem, NC
January 9, 2025; 6:00 p.m., ACCNX/ESPN+		at Pittsburgh	W 65–56	11–5 (4–1)	17 – Roberts	8 – Harris	3 – Tied	Peterson Events Center (357); Pittsburgh, PA
January 12, 2025; 4:00 p.m., ACCN		No. 13 Georgia Tech	W 69–60	12–5 (5–1)	16 – Roberts	7 – Williams	5 – Curry	KFC Yum! Center (8,917); Louisville, KY
January 16, 2025; 7:00 p.m., ACCNX/ESPN+		Syracuse	W 72–62	13–5 (6–1)	13 – Roberts	11 – Harris	7 – Williams	KFC Yum! Center (7,442); Louisville, KY
January 19, 2025; 4:00 p.m., ACCN		at Virginia Tech	L 65–70	13–6 (6–2)	14 – Cochran	8 – Cochran	4 – Williams	Cassell Coliseum (8,925); Blacksburg, VA
January 26, 2025; 2:00 p.m., The CW		at Virginia	W 68–65	14–6 (7–2)	19 – Curry	11 – Cochran	8 – Curry	John Paul Jones Arena (5,551); Charlottesville, VA
January 30, 2025; 8:00 p.m., ACCN		at SMU	W 80–75	15–6 (8–2)	22 – Roberts	5 – Cochran	5 – Roberts	Moody Coliseum (1,148); University Park, TX
February 2, 2025; 12:00 p.m., ESPN2		No. 3 Notre Dame	L 71–89	15–7 (8–3)	17 – Roberts	10 – Randolph	4 – Tied	KFC Yum! Center (11,603); Louisville, KY
February 6, 2025; 8:00 p.m., ACCN		No. 21 California	W 70–63	16–7 (9–3)	18 – Cochran	9 – Cochran	3 – Curry	KFC Yum! Center (7,093); Louisville, KY
February 9, 2025; 12:00 p.m., ESPN2		Stanford	W 74–65	17–7 (10–3)	21 – Roberts	6 – Tied	4 – Tied	KFC Yum! Center (8,281); Louisville, KY
February 13, 2025; 6:00 p.m., ACCNX/ESPN+		at No. 23 Florida State	W 83–69	18–7 (11–3)	17 – Tied	10 – Roberts	6 – Curry	Donald L. Tucker Center (1,913); Tallahassee, FL
February 20, 2025; 7:00 p.m., ESPN2		at No. 11 Duke	W 70–62	19–7 (12–3)	24 – Curry	4 – Tied	3 – Tied	Cameron Indoor Stadium (2,153); Durham, NC
February 23, 2025; 2:00 p.m., ESPN		No. 9 North Carolina	L 75–79	19–8 (12–4)	18 – Curry	10 – Cochran	4 – Tied	KFC Yum! Center (11,280); Louisville, KY
February 27, 2025; 6:00 p.m., ACCN	No. 25	Clemson	W 78–52	20–8 (13–4)	19 – Roberts	10 – Tied	5 – Roberts	KFC Yum! Center (7,881); Louisville, KY
March 2, 2025; 12:00 p.m., ESPN	No. 25	at No. 3 Notre Dame; College GameDay	L 59–72	20–9 (13–5)	19 – Curry	8 – Harris	2 – Tied	Purcell Pavilion (8,852); Notre Dame, IN
ACC Women's Tournament
March 6, 2025; 7:30 p.m., ACCN	(6)	vs. (14) Clemson; Second Round	W 70–68 ^{OT}	21–9	16 – Tied	12 – Williams	3 – Roberts	Greensboro Coliseum (5,828); Greensboro, NC
March 7, 2025; 7:30 p.m., ACCN	(6)	vs. (3) No. 11 Duke; Quarterfinals	L 48–61	21–10	13 – Randolph	11 – Cochran	3 – Williams	Greensboro Coliseum (7,108); Greensboro, NC
NCAA Tournament
March 21, 2025*; 6:00 p.m., ESPN	(7 B3)	vs. (10 B3) Nebraska; First Round	W 63–58	22–10	16 – Roberts	9 – Williams	6 – Curry	Schollmaier Arena (6,464); Fort Worth, TX
March 23, 2025*; 6:00 p.m., ESPN	(7 B3)	at (2 B3) No. 6 TCU; Second Round	L 70–85	22–11	41 – Curry	6 – Cochran	5 – Curry	Schollmaier Arena (7,494); Fort Worth, TX
*Non-conference game. ^{#}Rankings from AP Poll. (#) Tournament seedings in parentheses. B3=Birmingham 3. All times are in Eastern.

== Rankings ==
Ranking movements Legend: ██ Increase in ranking ██ Decrease in ranking — = Not ranked RV = Received votes
	Week																				
Poll	Pre	1	2	3	4	5	6	7	8	9	10	11	12	13	14	15	16	17	18	19	Final
AP	17	18	25	24	22	RV	—	—	—	—	RV	—	—	—	RV	RV	25	RV	RV	RV	RV
Coaches	17	18	22	23	22	RV	—	—	—	—	RV	RV	RV	RV	RV	RV	RV	RV	RV	RV	RV
