= Robert F. Hyland Performance Arena =

Multi-purpose arena in Saint Charles, Missouri

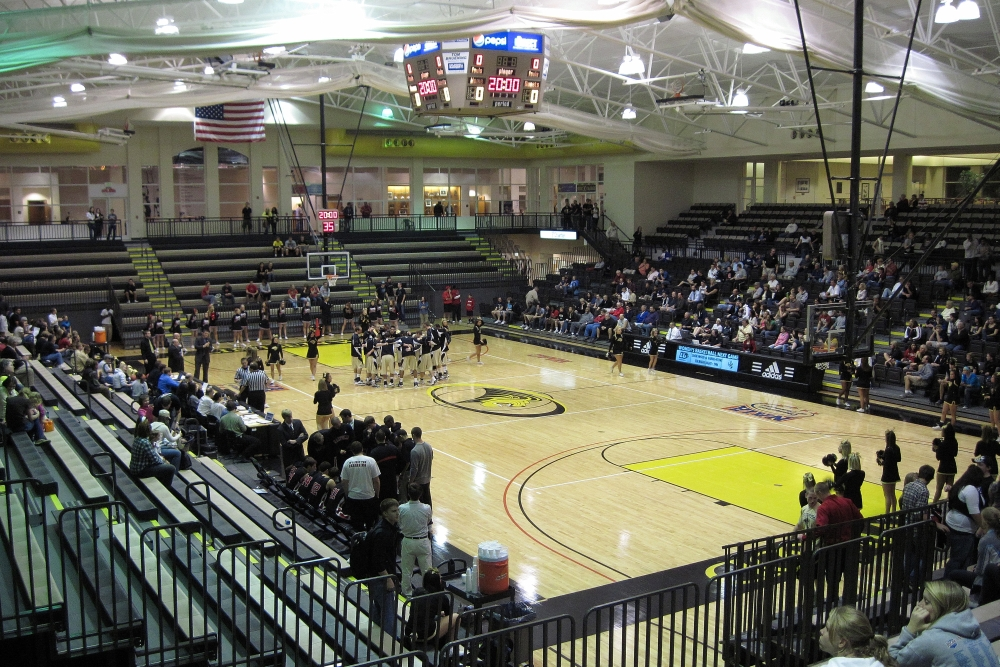
- Interactive map of Robert F. Hyland; Performance Arena
- Location: St. Charles, Missouri
- Coordinates: 38°47′21″N 90°30′13″W
- Owner: Lindenwood University
- Operator: Lindenwood University
- Capacity: 3,270

Construction
- Opened: 1997
- Architects: Hastings & Chivetta Architects Inc.

Tenant
- Lindenwood Lions (NCAA)

Robert F. Hyland Performance Arena or Hyland Performance Arena is a multi-purpose arena in on the campus of Lindenwood University in Saint Charles, Missouri. The arena opened in 1997 and is home to the Lindenwood Lions men's and women's basketball, women's gymnastics, men's and women's volleyball, and wrestling teams, as well as many of the school's club sports. The facility also includes the athletic department offices. Hyland Arena seats 3,270 spectators with 270 of those seats in luxury boxes. It was named after Robert Hyland who was the chairman of the Lindenwood board for many years and was also the CBS Regional Vice President and General Manager of radio station KMOX in St. Louis for four decades.

Lindenwood has explored the possibility of acquiring the nearby 10,000-seat Family Arena in a proposed deal that would give Saint Charles County the museum and property of the Daniel Boone Home owned by the university in exchange for the arena. Although the President of the university stated that the option hasn't been ruled out in the future. Lindenwood currently uses the Family Arena for convocation events.
