= Liberty Arena, Home of the Screaming Eagles =

Multi-use indoor arena near Evansville, Indiana, US

Liberty Arena
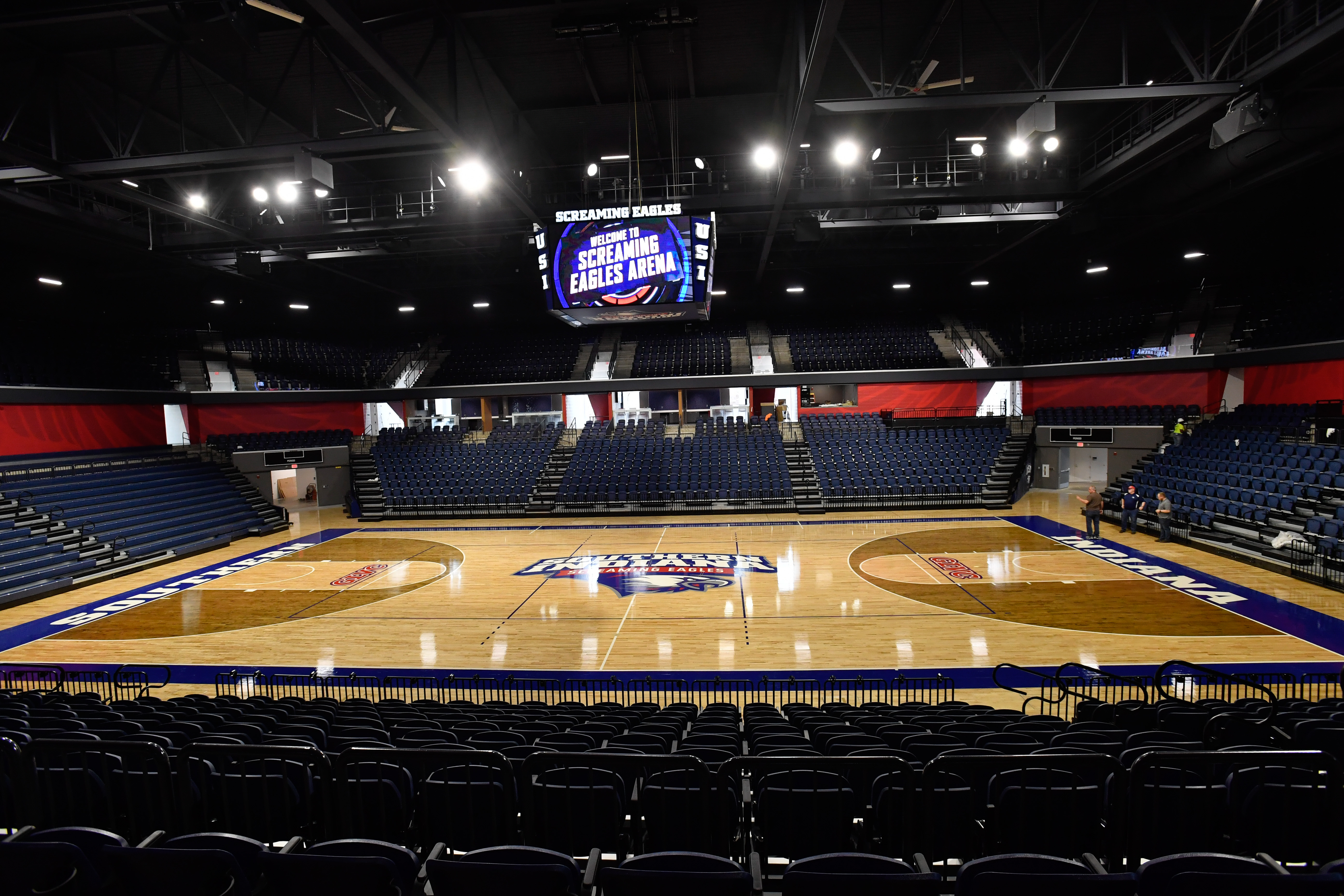

- Location within Indiana Location within the United States
- Interactive map of Liberty Arena
- Location: 8600 University Blvd; Evansville, Indiana 47712
- Coordinates: 37°57′43″N 87°40′29″W
- Owner: Vanderburgh County
- Capacity: 4,800
- Surface: Multi-surface

Construction
- Opened: April 4, 2019

Tenant
- Southern Indiana Screaming Eagles (NCAA) (2019–present)

Liberty Arena, Home of the Screaming Eagles is a multi-purpose arena in Vanderburgh County, Indiana with an Evansville mailing address. It is the home arena of the Southern Indiana Screaming Eagles at the University of Southern Indiana. Seating 4,800 people for basketball games, it opened in 2019 (as the Screaming Eagles Arena) after being rebuilt from the previous much smaller Physical Activities Center or PAC Arena to better prepare for what would eventually become a transition to Division I athletics.

During a press conference on Thursday, October 31, 2024, the University of Southern Indiana announced Liberty Federal Credit Union had made a historic $10 million gift to the University of Southern Indiana Foundation for USI Athletics, securing the naming rights to the Screaming Eagles Arena for the next 20 years. The arena will now be named Liberty Arena, Home of the Screaming Eagles.
