= 2024–25 James Madison Dukes women's basketball team =

American college basketball season

2024–25 James Madison Dukes women's basketball

Sun Belt regular-season champions

WBIT, quarterfinals
- Conference: Sun Belt Conference
- Record: 30–6 (18–0 Sun Belt)
- Head coach: Sean O'Regan (9th season)
- Assistant coaches: Kayla Cooper-Williams; Alex Tomlinson; Nicole Razor; Anastasiia Zakharova; Neil Harrow
- Home arena: Atlantic Union Bank Center

2024–25 Sun Belt Conference women's basketball standings
	Conf.				Overall
Team	W		L	PCT	W		L	PCT
James Madison	18	–	0	1.000	30	–	6	.833
Arkansas State †	15	–	3	.833	21	–	11	.656
Troy	13	–	5	.722	24	–	14	.632
Coastal Carolina	12	–	6	.667	23	–	9	.719
Old Dominion	9	–	9	.500	18	–	16	.529
Appalachian State	9	–	9	.500	13	–	17	.433
Louisiana	9	–	9	.500	13	–	16	.448
Georgia State	8	–	10	.444	17	–	16	.515
Louisiana–Monroe	7	–	11	.389	11	–	19	.367
Texas State	7	–	11	.389	13	–	17	.433
Marshall	6	–	12	.333	15	–	20	.429
Georgia Southern	6	–	12	.333	16	–	18	.471
Southern Miss	5	–	13	.278	10	–	21	.323
South Alabama	2	–	16	.111	6	–	24	.200
† 2025 Sun Belt tournament winner

The 2024–25 James Madison Dukes women's basketball team represented the James Madison University during the 2024–25 NCAA Division I women's basketball season. The Dukes, led by ninth-year head coach Sean O'Regan, played their home games at the Atlantic Union Bank Center in Harrisonburg, Virginia as members of the Sun Belt Conference.

The Dukes finished the season with a 30–6 record, 18–0 in Sun Belt play, to finish in first place. In the Sun Belt tournament, they defeated fourth seed Coastal Carolina in the semifinals before finishing off second-seeded Arkansas State in the championship game. In the WBIT, the Dukes beat Davidson and Marquette in the first and second rounds, respectively, before losing to Belmont in the quarterfinals. The Dukes set a program record for single-season wins with 30.

== Previous season ==
The Dukes finished the 2023–24 season 23–12, 13–5 in Sun Belt play, to finish in third place. They were defeated by first-seeded Marshall in the championship game of the Sun Belt tournament in overtime. The Dukes then competed in the WBIT and lost to Stony Brook in the first round.

== Preseason ==
On October 14, 2024, the Sun Belt Conference released their preseason coaches poll. James Madison was picked to finish first in the Sun Belt regular season.

=== Preseason rankings ===
Sun Belt preseason poll
Predicted finish	Team	Votes (1st place)
1	James Madison	191 (12)
2	Troy	169 (2)
3	Old Dominion	167
4	Louisiana–Monroe	150
5	Louisiana	122
6	Marshall	118
7	Southern Miss	113
8	Georgia State	107
9	Coastal Carolina	77
10	Texas State	67
11	Appalachian State	61
12	Georgia Southern	53
13	Arkansas State	50
14	South Alabama	25

=== Preseason All-Sun Belt teams ===
Preseason All-Sun Belt teams
Team	Player	Position	Year
First	Peyton McDaniel	Guard	4th
Second	Kseniia Kozlova	Center	5th
Third	Ro Scott	Guard	5th

Player of the Year: Peyton McDaniel, Guard, RS-Jr.

== Roster ==
2024–25 James Madison Dukes women's basketball team
Players
Coaches

Pos.	#	Name	Height	Year	Previous school	Hometown
G	00	Peyton McDaniel	6 ft 0 in (1.83 m)	RS Jr	Twin Valley High School	Birdsboro, PA
G	1	Olivia Mullins	5 ft 8 in (1.73 m)	RS Sr	Saint Joseph's	Somerset, NJ
G	2	Ro Scott	5 ft 8 in (1.73 m)	GS	Marshall	Earle, AR
G	3	Alonna Poole	5 ft 11 in (1.8 m)	Fr	Oakland High School	Nashville, TN
G	4	Delilah Soltys	5 ft 11 in (1.8 m)	Fr	Mauldin High School	Fountain Inn, SC
F	5	Ashanti Barnes	6 ft 2 in (1.88 m)	Sr	Trinity Valley Community College	Norfolk, VA
G/F	10	Angela Williams	6 ft 0 in (1.83 m)	Fr	Shades Valley High School	New Orleans, LA
G	11	Bree Robinson	5 ft 8 in (1.73 m)	So	Michigan State	Mississauga, ON
F	14	Annalicia Goodman	6 ft 3 in (1.91 m)	RS Sr	Heritage High School	Newport News, VA
G	15	Jada Mills	5 ft 9 in (1.75 m)	So	Putnam Science Academy	Norwich, CT
G	21	Zakiya Stephenson	5 ft 4 in (1.63 m)	So	Ole Miss	Virginia Beach, VA
F	23	Mikaya Tynes	6 ft 1 in (1.85 m)	Sr	Norview High School	Norfolk, VA
G	25	Jamia Hazell	5 ft 8 in (1.73 m)	RS Sr	Southeast Raleigh High School	Raleigh, NC
G	31	Atiana Williams	5 ft 7 in (1.7 m)	So	Menchville High School	Newport News, VA
C	35	Kseniia Kozlova	6 ft 3 in (1.91 m)	RS Sr	Middle Tennessee	Moscow, Russia
G	77	Laura Molnárová	5 ft 11 in (1.8 m)	Fr	Gymnázium Imre Madácha	Bratislava, Slovakia

Head coach

- Sean O'Regan (James Madison)

Assistant coach(es)

- Kayla Cooper Williams (James Madison)
- Alex Tomlinson (Wingate)
- Nicole Razor (Elon)
- Anastasiia Zakharova (Charleston (WV))
- Neil Harrow (West Scotland)

Legend

- (C) Team captain
- (S) Suspended
- (I) Ineligible
- (W) Walk-on
- Injured
- Current redshirt

Roster
Last update: March 2, 2025

== Schedule and results ==
Date time, TV	Rank^{#}	Opponent^{#}	Result	Record	Site (attendance) city, state
Regular season
November 4, 2024*; 7:00 p.m., ESPN+		at Kent State; MAC–SBC Challenge	W 67–56	1–0	MAC Center (1,350); Kent, OH
November 7, 2024*; 7:00 p.m., ESPN+		Loyola (MD)	W 85–54	2–0	Atlantic Union Bank Center (2,273); Harrisonburg, VA
November 10, 2024*; 2:00 p.m., ESPN+		East Carolina	W 57–51	3–0	Atlantic Union Bank Center (2,298); Harrisonburg, VA
November 13, 2024*; 7:00 p.m., ACCNX		at No. 6 Notre Dame	L 46–92	3–1	Purcell Pavilion (6,716); Notre Dame, IN
November 17, 2024*; 2:00 p.m., ESPN+		Gardner–Webb	W 102–69	4–1	Atlantic Union Bank Center (2,240); Harrisonburg, VA
November 20, 2024*; 7:00 p.m., ESPN+		Saint Peter's	W 73–32	5–1	Atlantic Union Bank Center (2,518); Harrisonburg, VA
November 28, 2024*; 3:30 p.m., BallerTV		vs. Northern Arizona; St. Pete Showcase	L 83–85 ^{OT}	5–2	Walter Athletic Complex (173); Tampa, FL
November 29, 2024*; 3:00 p.m., BallerTV		vs. Florida; St. Pete Showcase	W 77–72	6–2	Walter Athletic Complex (333); Tampa, FL
December 5, 2024*; 6:00 p.m., ESPN+		at VCU	W 55–42	7–2	Siegel Center (825); Richmond, VA
December 8, 2024*; 2:00 p.m., ESPN+		No. 4 Texas	L 62–93	7–3	Atlantic Union Bank Center (3,361); Harrisonburg, VA
December 15, 2024*; 2:00 p.m., FloHoops		at Villanova	W 71–67	8–3	Finneran Pavilion (1,501); Villanova, PA
December 19, 2024*; 7:00 p.m., ACCNX		at No. 21 NC State	L 47–61	8–4	Reynolds Coliseum (5,500); Raleigh, NC
December 29, 2024; 2:00 p.m., ESPN+		Troy	W 63–52	9–4 (1–0)	Atlantic Union Bank Center (3,376); Harrisonburg, VA
January 2, 2025; 7:00 p.m., ESPN+		at Louisiana	W 68–63	10–4 (2–0)	Cajundome (511); Lafayette, LA
January 4, 2025; 3:00 p.m., ESPN+		at Texas State	W 81–60	11–4 (3–0)	Strahan Arena (756); San Marcos, TX
January 9, 2025; 7:00 p.m., ESPN+		Marshall	W 71–59	12–4 (4–0)	Atlantic Union Bank Center (2,235); Harrisonburg, VA
January 11, 2025; 2:00 p.m., ESPN+		Georgia Southern	W 85–68	13–4 (5–0)	Atlantic Union Bank Center (2,370); Harrisonburg, VA
January 15, 2025; 6:00 p.m., ESPN+		at Marshall	W 93–65	14–4 (6–0)	Cam Henderson Center (1,149); Huntington, WV
January 18, 2025; 1:00 p.m., ESPN+		at Coastal Carolina	W 74–54	15–4 (7–0)	HTC Center (941); Conway, SC
January 24, 2025; 7:00 p.m., ESPN+		Southern Miss	W 62–47	16–4 (8–0)	Atlantic Union Bank Center (2,320); Harrisonburg, VA
January 26, 2025; 1:00 p.m., ESPN+		Coastal Carolina	W 76–69	17–4 (9–0)	Atlantic Union Bank Center (2,396); Harrisonburg, VA
January 29, 2025; 6:00 p.m., ESPN+		at Georgia Southern	W 77–60	18–4 (10–0)	Hill Convocation Center (573); Statesboro, GA
February 1, 2025; 2:00 p.m., ESPN+		at Old Dominion; Royal Rivalry	W 85–62	19–4 (11–0)	Chartway Arena (2,987); Norfolk, VA
February 5, 2025; 8:00 p.m., ESPN+		at South Alabama	W 76–62	20–4 (12–0)	Mitchell Center (358); Mobile, AL
February 8, 2025*; 2:00 p.m., ESPN+		Ball State; MAC–SBC Challenge	W 78–74	21–4	Atlantic Union Bank Center (2,970); Harrisonburg, VA
February 13, 2025; 5:00 p.m., ESPN+		Appalachian State	W 77–61	22–4 (13–0)	Atlantic Union Bank Center (2,108); Harrisonburg, VA
February 15, 2025; 2:00 p.m., ESPN+		Old Dominion; Royal Rivalry	W 66–53	23–4 (14–0)	Atlantic Union Bank Center (4,375); Harrisonburg, VA
February 19, 2025; 6:30 p.m., ESPN+		at Georgia State	W 62–55	24–4 (15–0)	GSU Convocation Center (1,302); Atlanta, GA
February 22, 2025; 3:30 p.m., ESPN+		at Appalachian State	W 83–57	25–4 (16–0)	Holmes Center (1,129); Boone, NC
February 26, 2025; 7:00 p.m., ESPN+		Georgia State	W 80–74	26–4 (17–0)	Atlantic Union Bank Center (2,270); Harrisonburg, VA
February 28, 2025; 7:00 p.m., ESPN+		Louisiana–Monroe	W 79–51	27–4 (18–0)	Atlantic Union Bank Center (2,799); Harrisonburg, VA
Sun Belt tournament
March 9, 2025; 12:30 p.m., ESPN+	(1)	vs. (4) Coastal Carolina; Semifinals	W 89–65	28–4	Pensacola Bay Center (717); Pensacola, FL
March 10, 2025; 2:00 p.m., ESPN2	(1)	vs. (2) Arkansas State; Championship	L 79–86 ^{OT}	28–5	Pensacola Bay Center (847); Pensacola, FL
WBIT
March 20, 2025*; 7:00 p.m., ESPN+	(1)	Davidson; First round	W 77–50	29–5	Atlantic Union Bank Center (985); Harrisonburg, VA
March 23, 2025*; 4:00 p.m., ESPN+	(1)	Marquette; Second round	W 80–76	30–5	Atlantic Union Bank Center (1,239); Harrisonburg, VA
March 27, 2025*; 7:00 p.m., ESPN+	(1)	(3) Belmont; Quarterfinals	L 45–90	30–6	Atlantic Union Bank Center (1,645); Harrisonburg, VA
*Non-conference game. ^{#}Rankings from AP poll. (#) Tournament seedings in parentheses. All times are in Eastern.
