= 2024–25 South Alabama Jaguars women's basketball team =

Intercollegiate basketball season

2024–25 South Alabama Jaguars women's basketball
- Conference: Sun Belt Conference
- Record: 6–24 (2–16 Sun Belt)
- Head coach: Yolisha Jackson (2nd season)
- Assistant coaches: Eryc Pittman; Colby Davis; Brooke LeMar
- Home arena: Mitchell Center

2024–25 Sun Belt Conference women's basketball standings
	Conf.				Overall
Team	W		L	PCT	W		L	PCT
James Madison	18	–	0	1.000	30	–	6	.833
Arkansas State †	15	–	3	.833	21	–	11	.656
Troy	13	–	5	.722	24	–	14	.632
Coastal Carolina	12	–	6	.667	23	–	9	.719
Old Dominion	9	–	9	.500	18	–	16	.529
Appalachian State	9	–	9	.500	13	–	17	.433
Louisiana	9	–	9	.500	13	–	16	.448
Georgia State	8	–	10	.444	17	–	16	.515
Louisiana–Monroe	7	–	11	.389	11	–	19	.367
Texas State	7	–	11	.389	13	–	17	.433
Marshall	6	–	12	.333	15	–	20	.429
Georgia Southern	6	–	12	.333	16	–	18	.471
Southern Miss	5	–	13	.278	10	–	21	.323
South Alabama	2	–	16	.111	6	–	24	.200
† 2025 Sun Belt tournament winner

The 2024–25 South Alabama Jaguars women's basketball team represented the University of South Alabama during the 2024–25 NCAA Division I women's basketball season. The basketball team, led by second-year head coach Yolisha Jackson, played all home games at the Mitchell Center along with the South Alabama Jaguars men's basketball team. They were members of the Sun Belt Conference.

== Previous season ==
The Jaguars finished the 2023–24 season with a record of 9–23 overall and 2–16 in conference play. They lost to Coastal Carolina in the first round of their conference tournament. They did not advance to postseason play.

== Preseason ==
On October 14, 2024, the Sun Belt Conference released their preseason coaches poll. South Alabama was picked to finish last in the Sun Belt regular season.

=== Preseason rankings ===
Sun Belt preseason poll
Predicted finish	Team	Votes (1st place)
1	James Madison	191 (12)
2	Troy	169 (2)
3	Old Dominion	167
4	Louisiana–Monroe	150
5	Louisiana	122
6	Marshall	118
7	Southern Miss	113
8	Georgia State	107
9	Coastal Carolina	77
10	Texas State	67
11	Appalachian State	61
12	Georgia Southern	53
13	Arkansas State	50
14	South Alabama	25

== Offseason ==
=== Departures ===
Name	Number	Pos.	Height	Year	Hometown	Notes
Zena Elias	1	C	6'3"	RS-Senior	Clearwater, Florida	Graduated
Kelsey Thompson	2	G	5'9"	Sophomore	Mobile, Alabama	Transferred to Old Dominion
Camryn Berry	5	G	5'10"	Freshman	Atlanta, Georgia	Transferred to Pensacola State College
Kamaria Gipson	6	F	6'3"	Senior	Beeville, Texas	Transferred to Alabama A&M
Tyrielle Williams	7	G	5'7"	RS-Sophomore	New Orleans, Louisiana	Transferred to McNeese
Kiana Anderson	14	F	6'1"	RS-Sophomore	New Orleans, Louisiana	Graduated
Cheyenne Pearson	20	C	6'4"	Freshman	Trussville, Alabama	Transferred to Mississippi Gulf Coast CC
Debbie Reese	30	C	6'1"	RS-Sophomore	Fort Pierce, Florida	
Emani Burks	33	F	6'2"	RS-Sophomore	Melbourne, Florida	Transferred to Nicholls

=== Recruiting ===
College recruiting information
Name	Hometown	School	Height	Weight	Commit date
Aroa Mangas; Guard	Salamanca, Spain	IES La Laboral	5 ft 9 in (1.75 m)	N/A	
Aroa Mangas; Guard	Recruit ratings: No ratings found				
Terren Coffil; Guard	New Orleans, LA	Chalmette HS	5 ft 7 in (1.70 m)	N/A	
Terren Coffil; Guard	Recruit ratings: No ratings found				
Princess Okafor Nweze; Forward	Salamanca, Spain	IES Mar Alboran	6 ft 1 in (1.85 m)	N/A	
Princess Okafor Nweze; Forward	Recruit ratings: No ratings found				
Overall recruit ranking:
Note: In many cases, Scout, Rivals, 247Sports, On3, and ESPN may conflict in their listings of height and weight.; In these cases, the average was taken. ESPN grades are on a 100-point scale.; Sources: "South Alabama 2024-25 Basketball Commits". ESPN.; "2024-25 Team Ranking". Rivals.com.

== Roster ==
2024–25 South Alabama Jaguars women's basketball team
Players
Coaches

Pos.	#	Name	Height	Year	Previous school	Hometown
G	0	Chrysta Narcisse	5 ft 8 in (1.73 m)	RS Fr	Lafayette HS	Lafayette, Louisiana
C	2	Tara Green	6 ft 3 in (1.91 m)	Sr	Central HS; UIC	West Helena, Arkansas
F	3	Naomi Smitherman	6 ft 1 in (1.85 m)	Jr	Ramsay HS	Birmingham, Alabama
G	4	Michiyah Simmons	5 ft 6 in (1.68 m)	Jr	Blanche Ely HS	Pompano Beach, Florida
G	5	Amyria Walker	5 ft 4 in (1.63 m)	Jr	Centennial HS; Angelina College	Burleson, Texas
G	7	Aroa Mangas	5 ft 9 in (1.75 m)	Fr	IES La Laboral	Salamanca, Spain
G	8	Terren Coffil	5 ft 7 in (1.7 m)	Fr	Chalmette HS	New Orleans, Louisiana
G	10	Janelle Jones	5 ft 9 in (1.75 m)	GS	B. T. Washington HS	Pensacola, Florida
G	11	Nadia Howard	5 ft 9 in (1.75 m)	Sr	Grayson HS	Grayson, Georgia
F	15	Princess Okafor Nweze	6 ft 1 in (1.85 m)	Fr	IES Mar Alboran	Málaga, Spain
F	20	Daniela Gonzalez	6 ft 0 in (1.83 m)	Jr	Nativos Valle; South Florida	Jamundí, Colombia
C	21	Alicia Spann	6 ft 3 in (1.91 m)	Jr	Sumter HS; Daytona State College	Sumter, South Carolina
G	22	Rachel Leggett	5 ft 8 in (1.73 m)	Jr	Navarre HS	Navarre, Florida
G	23	Saneea Bevley	—	Jr	Blue Springs HS; McLennan Community College	Kansas City, Missouri
G	24	Jordan Rosier	5 ft 9 in (1.75 m)	Sr	Florida State University HS	Tallahassee, Florida

Head coach

- Yolisha Jackson (Jacksonville)

Assistant coach(es)

- Eryc Pittman (Hampton)
- Colby Davis (South Alabama)
- Brooke LeMar (North Dakota State)

Legend

- (C) Team captain
- (S) Suspended
- (I) Ineligible
- (W) Walk-on
- Injured
- Current redshirt

Roster
Last update: 30 September 2024

== Schedule and results ==
Date time, TV	Rank^{#}	Opponent^{#}	Result	Record	High points	High rebounds	High assists	Site city, state
Regular season
November 4, 2024*; 5:00 p.m., ESPN+		Delta State	W 63–56	1–0	13 – Tied	13 – Gonzalez	3 – Tied	Mitchell Center (541); Mobile, AL
November 7, 2024*; 11:00 a.m., ESPN+		Louisiana Tech	L 70–78	1–1	16 – Simmons	9 – Gonzalez	3 – Gonzalez	Mitchell Center (2,030); Mobile, AL
November 11, 2024*; 5:00 p.m., ESPN+		at Rice	L 57–77	1–2	15 – Walker	7 – Spann	3 – Rosier	Tudor Fieldhouse (567); Houston, TX
November 15, 2024*; 7:00 p.m., ESPN+		at North Alabama	L 62–71	1–3	21 – Walker	13 – Gonzalez	4 – Howard	CB&S Bank Arena (1,939); Florence, AL
November 19, 2024*; 11:00 a.m., ESPN+		at New Orleans	W 67–57	2–3	18 – Simmons	10 – Gonzalez	3 – Tied	Lakefront Arena (1,865); New Orleans, LA
November 29, 2024*; 6:00 p.m., ESPN+		at Charleston	L 62–83	2–4	16 – Rosier	6 – Gonzalez	5 – Walker	TD Arena (269); Charleston, SC
December 1, 2024*; 1:00 p.m., ESPN+		at Charleston Southern	L 55–60	2–5	22 – Simmons	8 – Gonzalez	3 – Walker	Buccaneer Field House (156); Charleston, SC
December 7, 2024*; 2:00 p.m., ESPN+		Faulkner	W 79–44	3–5	18 – Rosier	10 – Leggett	6 – Rosier	Mitchell Center (381); Mobile, AL
December 15, 2024*; 2:00 p.m., SECN		at No. 22т Ole Miss	L 39–94	3–6	13 – Gonzalez	5 – Leggett	3 – Gonzalez	SJB Pavilion (2,602); Oxford, MS
December 19, 2024*; 10:00 a.m.		at Stetson; The Hatter Invitational	W 87–79	4–6	24 – Coffil	9 – Leggett	6 – Gonzalez	Edmunds Center; DeLand, FL
December 20, 2024*; 12:15 p.m.		vs. Bethune–Cookman; The Hatter Invitational	L 62–67	4–7	17 – Walker	13 – Leggett	2 – Narcisse	Edmunds Center (117); DeLand, FL
December 29, 2024; 12:00 p.m., ESPN+		at Old Dominion	L 59–82	4–8 (0–1)	20 – Gonzalez	10 – Gonzalez	3 – Tied	Chartway Arena (1,505); Norfolk, VA
January 2, 2025; 2:00 p.m., ESPN+		Appalachian State	L 67–82	4–9 (0–2)	30 – Walker	8 – Spann	2 – Tied	Mitchell Center (281); Mobile, AL
January 4, 2025; 2:00 p.m., ESPN+		Coastal Carolina	L 58–73	4–10 (0–3)	19 – Gonzalez	10 – Leggett	4 – Leggett	Mitchell Center (528); Mobile, AL
January 9, 2025; 5:00 p.m., ESPN+		Louisiana	L 50–76	4–11 (0–4)	20 – Leggett	11 – Leggett	2 – Coffil	Mitchell Center (488); Mobile, AL
January 11, 2025; 2:00 p.m., ESPN+		at Texas State	L 54–65	4–12 (0–5)	14 – Leggett	6 – Leggett	3 – Gonzalez	Strahan Arena (769); San Marcos, TX
January 16, 2025; 7:00 p.m., ESPN+		at Troy	L 60–99	4–13 (0–6)	18 – Leggett	10 – Gonzalez	3 – Tied	Trojan Arena (2,958); Troy, AL
January 18, 2025; 2:00 p.m., ESPN+		at Southern Miss	L 49–78	4–14 (0–7)	12 – Leggett	3 – Tied	4 – Walker	Reed Green Coliseum (1,291); Hattiesburg, MS
January 25, 2025; 2:00 p.m., ESPN+		Arkansas State	L 71–82	4–15 (0–8)	20 – Walker	12 – Gonzalez	4 – Leggett	Mitchell Center (452); Mobile, AL
January 30, 2025; 6:30 p.m., ESPN+		at Louisiana–Monroe	L 70–78	4–16 (0–9)	14 – Leggett	6 – Narcisse	3 – Tied	Fant–Ewing Coliseum (989); Monroe, LA
February 1, 2025; 2:00 p.m., ESPN+		at Arkansas State	L 63–80	4–17 (0–10)	16 – Leggett	6 – Tied	5 – Narcisse	First National Bank Arena (1,007); Jonesboro, AR
February 5, 2025; 7:00 p.m., ESPN+		James Madison	L 62–76	4–18 (0–11)	17 – Gonzalez	8 – Leggett	3 – Tied	Mitchell Center (358); Mobile, AL
February 8, 2025; 2:00 p.m., ESPN+		Louisiana–Monroe; Rescheduled from January 22	W 73–68	5–18 (1–11)	22 – Leggett	9 – Okafor Nweze	4 – Gonzalez	Mitchell Center (355); Mobile, AL
February 13, 2025; 10:00 a.m., ESPN+		at Georgia State	L 69–78 ^{2OT}	5–19 (1–12)	20 – Leggett	10 – Leggett	5 – Coffil	GSU Convocation Center (2,849); Atlanta, GA
February 15, 2025; 12:00 p.m., ESPN+		at Georgia Southern	L 68–95	5–20 (1–13)	13 – Simmons	4 – Leggett	5 – Coffil	Hill Convocation Center (1,023); Statesboro, GA
February 19, 2025; 7:00 p.m., ESPN+		Southern Miss	W 66–57	6–20 (2–13)	19 – Leggett	7 – Gonzalez	4 – Gonzalez	Mitchell Center (504); Mobile, AL
February 22, 2025; 2:00 p.m., ESPN+		Troy	L 71–86	6–21 (2–14)	27 – Leggett	8 – Leggett	4 – Narcisse	Mitchell Center (476); Mobile, AL
February 26, 2025; 5:00 p.m., ESPN+		at Louisiana	L 48–55	6–22 (2–15)	13 – Simmons	5 – Tied	2 – Gonzalez	Cajundome (415); Lafayette, LA
February 28, 2025; 5:00 p.m., ESPN+		Texas State	L 56–63	6–23 (2–16)	19 – Leggett	5 – Tied	2 – Tied	Mitchell Center (700); Mobile, AL
Sun Belt tournament
March 4, 2025; 2:00 p.m., ESPN+	(14)	vs. (11) Marshall; First Round	L 59–73	6–24	16 – Howard	5 – Tied	2 – Tied	Pensacola Bay Center (516); Pensacola, FL
*Non-conference game. ^{#}Rankings from AP Poll. (#) Tournament seedings in parentheses. All times are in Central Time.

- Source: South Alabama Athletics

== See also ==
- 2024–25 South Alabama Jaguars men's basketball team
