= 2024–25 Texas State Bobcats women's basketball team =

American college basketball season

2024–25 Texas State Bobcats women's basketball
- Conference: Sun Belt Conference
- Record: 13–17 (7–11 Sun Belt)
- Head coach: Zenarae Antoine (14th season)
- Associate head coach: Nathan Teymer
- Assistant coaches: Jericka Jenkins; Paige Love
- Home arena: Strahan Arena

2024–25 Sun Belt Conference women's basketball standings
	Conf.				Overall
Team	W		L	PCT	W		L	PCT
James Madison	18	–	0	1.000	30	–	6	.833
Arkansas State †	15	–	3	.833	21	–	11	.656
Troy	13	–	5	.722	24	–	14	.632
Coastal Carolina	12	–	6	.667	23	–	9	.719
Old Dominion	9	–	9	.500	18	–	16	.529
Appalachian State	9	–	9	.500	13	–	17	.433
Louisiana	9	–	9	.500	13	–	16	.448
Georgia State	8	–	10	.444	17	–	16	.515
Louisiana–Monroe	7	–	11	.389	11	–	19	.367
Texas State	7	–	11	.389	13	–	17	.433
Marshall	6	–	12	.333	15	–	20	.429
Georgia Southern	6	–	12	.333	16	–	18	.471
Southern Miss	5	–	13	.278	10	–	21	.323
South Alabama	2	–	16	.111	6	–	24	.200
† 2025 Sun Belt tournament winner

The 2024–25 Texas State Bobcats women's basketball team represented the Texas State University during the 2024–25 NCAA Division I women's basketball season. The Bobcats, led by fourteenth-year head coach Zenarae Antoine, played their home games at the Strahan Arena. They were competing members of the Sun Belt Conference.

== Previous season ==
The Bobcats finished the 2023–24 season 14–18, 4–14 in the Sun Belt play to finish in a tie for twelfth place. They were defeated by 12th-seeded Georgia Southern in the first round of the Sun Belt tournament.

== Preseason ==
On October 14, 2024, the Sun Belt Conference released their preseason coaches poll. Texas State was picked to finish tenth in the Sun Belt regular season.

=== Preseason rankings ===
Sun Belt preseason poll
Predicted finish	Team	Votes (1st place)
1	James Madison	191 (12)
2	Troy	169 (2)
3	Old Dominion	167
4	Louisiana–Monroe	150
5	Louisiana	122
6	Marshall	118
7	Southern Miss	113
8	Georgia State	107
9	Coastal Carolina	77
10	Texas State	67
11	Appalachian State	61
12	Georgia Southern	53
13	Arkansas State	50
14	South Alabama	25

== Roster ==
2024–25 Texas State Bobcats women's basketball team
Players
Coaches

Pos.	#	Name	Height	Year	Previous school	Hometown
G	0	Heather Baymon	5 ft 8 in (1.73 m)	Fr	Langham Creek High School	Phoenix, Arizona
G	1	Takeira Ramey	5 ft 7 in (1.7 m)	Fr	Massaponax High School	Stafford, Virginia
G	2	Saniya Burks	5 ft 8 in (1.73 m)	Fr	Rice High School	Mexia, Texas
G	3	Crystal Smith	5 ft 9 in (1.75 m)	Sr	Blinn College	Bastrop, Louisiana
G	4	Sierra Dickson	5 ft 7 in (1.7 m)	GS	Hebron High School	Carrollton, Texas
F	5	Morgan Hill	6 ft 3 in (1.91 m)	Sr	Louisiana–Monroe	Houston, Texas
G	8	Ja'Mia Harris	5 ft 11 in (1.8 m)	RS So	Kansas State	Lancaster, Texas
G	10	Destiny Terrell	5 ft 9 in (1.75 m)	GS	Incarnate Word	Dallas, Texas
F	11	Jaylin Foster	6 ft 0 in (1.83 m)	Sr	Western Kentucky	Austin, Texas
G	12	Blake Matthews	5 ft 4 in (1.63 m)	Jr	Bucknell	Houston, Texas
G	13	Taleiyah Gibbs	6 ft 0 in (1.83 m)	So	Howard	Charleston, South Carolina
F	15	Ebba Zalamans	6 ft 0 in (1.83 m)	RS So	McCook Community College	Stockholm, Sweden
G	22	Mia Galbraith	5 ft 9 in (1.75 m)	So	Oklahoma State	Sunshine Coast, Australia
G/F	23	Melinda Winston	6 ft 0 in (1.83 m)	Fr	Alief Hastings High School	Houston, Texas
F	40	Nicole Leff	6 ft 1 in (1.85 m)	GS	Cedar Park High School	Cedar Park, Texas

Head coach

- Zenarae Antoine (Colorado State)

Assistant coach(es)

- Nathan Teymer (Grand View)
- Jericka Jenkins (Hampton)
- Paige Love (UNC Asheville)

Legend

- (C) Team captain
- (S) Suspended
- (I) Ineligible
- (W) Walk-on
- Injured
- Current redshirt

Roster
Last update: March 2, 2025

== Schedule and results ==
Date time, TV	Rank^{#}	Opponent^{#}	Result	Record	Site (attendance) city, state
Regular season
November 4, 2024*; 6:30 p.m., ESPN+		at Eastern Michigan; MAC-SBC Challenge	W 75–71	1–0	George Gervin GameAbove Center (1,137); Ypsilanti, MI
November 9, 2024*; 2:00 p.m., ESPN+		Texas A&M–Corpus Christi	L 57–62	1–1	Strahan Arena (855); San Marcos, TX
November 13, 2024*; 6:30 p.m., ESPN+		at TCU	L 31–90	1–2	Schollmaier Arena (2,273); Fort Worth, TX
November 18, 2024*; 7:00 p.m., ESPN+		Sul Ross	W 99–65	2–2	Strahan Arena (674); San Marcos, TX
November 22, 2024*; 7:00 p.m., ESPN+		Stephen F. Austin	L 60–79	2–3	Strahan Arena (753); San Marcos, TX
November 30, 2024*; 2:00 p.m., ESPN+		at UT Rio Grande Valley	W 68–59	3–3	UTRGV Fieldhouse (515); Edinburg, TX
December 4, 2024*; 7:00 p.m., ESPN+		at Tarleton State	W 71–59	4–3	Wisdom Gymnasium (927); Stephenville, TX
December 8, 2024*; 12:00 p.m., ESPN+		UNT Dallas	W 88–42	5–3	Strahan Arena; San Marcos, TX
December 15, 2024*; 1:00 p.m., SLN		at Denver	W 63–60	6–3	Hamilton Gymnasium (259); Denver, CO
December 21, 2024*; 1:00 p.m., ESPN+		UTSA; I-35 Rivalry	L 54–70	6–4	Strahan Arena; San Marcos, TX
December 29, 2024; 12:00 p.m., ESPN+		at Marshall	W 60–49	7–4 (1–0)	Cam Henderson Center (1,117); Huntington, WV
January 2, 2025; 7:00 p.m., ESPN+		Georgia State	L 51–59	7–5 (1–1)	Strahan Arena (618); San Marcos, TX
January 4, 2025; 2:00 p.m., ESPN+		James Madison	L 60–81	7–6 (1–2)	Strahan Arena (756); San Marcos, TX
January 8, 2025; 7:00 p.m., ESPN+		Arkansas State	L 50–66	7–7 (1–3)	Strahan Arena (511); San Marcos, TX
January 11, 2025; 2:00 p.m., ESPN+		South Alabama	W 65–54	8–7 (2–3)	Strahan Arena (769); San Marcos, TX
January 15, 2025; 5:00 p.m., ESPN+		at Georgia Southern	L 62–69	8–8 (2–4)	Hill Convocation Center (573); Statesboro, GA
January 18, 2025; 12:00 p.m., ESPN+		at Old Dominion	W 65–60	9–8 (3–4)	Chartway Arena (1,749); Norfolk, VA
January 23, 2025; 11:00 a.m., ESPN+		Troy	L 58–105	9–9 (3–5)	Strahan Arena (2,382); San Marcos, TX
January 25, 2025; 2:00 p.m., ESPN+		Louisiana–Monroe	L 66–74	9–10 (3–6)	Strahan Arena (780); San Marcos, TX
January 30, 2025; 6:00 p.m., ESPN+		at Southern Miss	L 46–52	9–11 (3–7)	Reed Green Coliseum (1,307); Hattiesburg, MS
February 1, 2025; 2:00 p.m., ESPN+		at Louisiana–Monroe	W 67–64	10–11 (4–7)	Fant–Ewing Coliseum (1,021); Monroe, LA
February 5, 2025; 7:00 p.m., ESPN+		Coastal Carolina	L 60–68	10–12 (4–8)	Strahan Arena (749); San Marcos, TX
February 8, 2025*; 2:00 p.m., ESPN+		Western Michigan; MAC-SBC Challenge	L 50–59	10–13	Strahan Arena (644); San Marcos, TX
February 12, 2025; 5:00 p.m., ESPN+		at Louisiana	L 54–71	10–14 (4–9)	Cajundome (421); Lafayette, LA
February 15, 2025; 12:00 p.m., ESPN+		at Arkansas State	L 62–72	10–15 (4–10)	First National Bank Arena (1,017); Jonesboro, AR
February 19, 2025; 5:00 p.m., ESPN+		Louisiana	W 69–58	11–15 (5–10)	Strahan Arena; San Marcos, TX
February 22, 2025; 2:00 p.m., ESPN+		Southern Miss	W 62–57	12–15 (6–10)	Strahan Arena; San Marcos, TX
February 26, 2025; 7:00 p.m., ESPN+		at Troy	L 66–86	12–16 (6–11)	Trojan Arena (1,477); Troy, AL
February 28, 2025; 5:00 p.m., ESPN+		at South Alabama	W 63–56	13–16 (7–11)	Mitchell Center (700); Mobile, AL
Sun Belt tournament
March 5, 2025; 2:00 p.m., ESPN+	(10)	vs. (11) Marshall; Second Round	L 62–68	13–17	Pensacola Bay Center; Pensacola, FL
*Non-conference game. ^{#}Rankings from AP Poll. (#) Tournament seedings in parentheses. All times are in Central.
