= 2024–25 Appalachian State Mountaineers women's basketball team =

Intercollegiate basketball season

2024–25 Appalachian State Mountaineers women's basketball
- Conference: Sun Belt Conference
- Record: 13–17 (9–9 Sun Belt)
- Head coach: Alaura Sharp (1st season)
- Assistant coaches: Rabun Wright; Brooklyn Taylor; Caleb Thomas; LaRomeo McKee
- Home arena: Holmes Center

2024–25 Sun Belt Conference women's basketball standings
| | Conf. | | | | Overall |
| Team | W | | L | PCT | W | | L | PCT |
|---|---|---|---|---|---|---|---|---|
| James Madison | 18 | – | 0 | 1.000 | 30 | – | 6 | .833 |
| Arkansas State † | 15 | – | 3 | .833 | 21 | – | 11 | .656 |
| Troy | 13 | – | 5 | .722 | 24 | – | 14 | .632 |
| Coastal Carolina | 12 | – | 6 | .667 | 23 | – | 9 | .719 |
| Old Dominion | 9 | – | 9 | .500 | 18 | – | 16 | .529 |
| Appalachian State | 9 | – | 9 | .500 | 13 | – | 17 | .433 |
| Louisiana | 9 | – | 9 | .500 | 13 | – | 16 | .448 |
| Georgia State | 8 | – | 10 | .444 | 17 | – | 16 | .515 |
| Louisiana–Monroe | 7 | – | 11 | .389 | 11 | – | 19 | .367 |
| Texas State | 7 | – | 11 | .389 | 13 | – | 17 | .433 |
| Marshall | 6 | – | 12 | .333 | 15 | – | 20 | .429 |
| Georgia Southern | 6 | – | 12 | .333 | 16 | – | 18 | .471 |
| Southern Miss | 5 | – | 13 | .278 | 10 | – | 21 | .323 |
| South Alabama | 2 | – | 16 | .111 | 6 | – | 24 | .200 |
† 2025 Sun Belt tournament winner

The 2024–25 Appalachian State Mountaineers women's basketball team represented Appalachian State University during the 2024–25 NCAA Division I women's basketball season. The basketball team, led by first-year head coach Alaura Sharp, played all home games at Holmes Center, along with the Appalachian State Mountaineers men's basketball team. They were members of the Sun Belt Conference.

On March 18, 2024, head coach Angel Elderkin resigned from her position, citing personal reasons. The Mountaineers hired Presbyterian head coach Alaura Sharp on April 5.

== Preseason ==
On October 14, 2024, the Sun Belt Conference released their preseason coaches poll. Appalachian State was picked to finish eleventh in the Sun Belt regular season.

=== Preseason rankings ===
Sun Belt preseason poll
| Predicted finish | Team | Votes (1st place) |
|---|---|---|
| 1 | James Madison | 191 (12) |
| 2 | Troy | 169 (2) |
| 3 | Old Dominion | 167 |
| 4 | Louisiana–Monroe | 150 |
| 5 | Louisiana | 122 |
| 6 | Marshall | 118 |
| 7 | Southern Miss | 113 |
| 8 | Georgia State | 107 |
| 9 | Coastal Carolina | 77 |
| 10 | Texas State | 67 |
| 11 | Appalachian State | 61 |
| 12 | Georgia Southern | 53 |
| 13 | Arkansas State | 50 |
| 14 | South Alabama | 25 |

=== Preseason All-Sun Belt Teams ===
Preseason All-Sun Belt teams
| Team | Player | Position | Year |
|---|---|---|---|
| First | Emily Carver | Guard | 4th |

== Roster ==
2024–25 Appalachian State Mountaineers women's basketball team
Players
Coaches

| Pos. | # | Name | Height | Year | Previous school | Hometown |
|---|---|---|---|---|---|---|
| G | 2 | Mara Neira | 5 ft 8 in (1.73 m) | Sr | IES Primeiro de Marzo; Presbyterian | Galicia, Spain |
| G | 4 | J'Mani Ingram | 5 ft 7 in (1.7 m) | Sr | North Augusta HS; Pearl River CC | North Augusta, South Carolina |
| G | 8 | Seneya Martinez | 5 ft 8 in (1.73 m) | Jr | Word of Life Christian Academy | Greeley, Colorado |
| G | 10 | Emily Carver | 5 ft 10 in (1.78 m) | Sr | Enka HS | Asheville, North Carolina |
| G | 12 | Zada Porter | 5 ft 9 in (1.75 m) | Sr | Cave Spring HS | Roanoke, Virginia |
| F | 15 | Rylan Moffitt | 6 ft 0 in (1.83 m) | Jr | Wekiva HS; Daytona State | Bushnell, Florida |
| G | 16 | Hekla Nökkvadóttir | 5 ft 10 in (1.78 m) | Fr | Fjölbrautaskóli Suðurnesja | Grindavík, Iceland |
| F | 20 | Elena Pericic | 6 ft 1 in (1.85 m) | Jr | Gymnasium Dr. Anton Barac; Salem | Rijeka, Croatia |
| G | 21 | Eleyana Tafisi | 5 ft 6 in (1.68 m) | Sr | Copper Hills HS; Utah Valley | West Jordan, Utah |
| F | 23 | Samantha LaFon | 6 ft 0 in (1.83 m) | Sr | Ironton HS; Marshall | Chesapeake, Ohio |
| G | 24 | Asjah Inniss | 5 ft 9 in (1.75 m) | Sr | Collins Hall HS; George Washington | Duluth, Georgia |
| F | 25 | Georgia Gray | 6 ft 3 in (1.91 m) | Sr | Mooroolbark College; Idaho | Melbourne, Australia |
| F | 32 | Zoë McCrary | 6 ft 2 in (1.88 m) | GS | Allen HS; Charleston | Allen, Texas |
| G | 34 | Emily Hege | 5 ft 7 in (1.7 m) | Jr | North Davidson HS; Wingate | Lexington, North Carolina |

Head coach

- Alaura Sharp (Southwest Minnesota State)

Assistant coach(es)

- Rabun Wright (North Alabama)
- Brooklyn Taylor (Saint Francis (PA))
- Caleb Thomas (Louisiana Tech)
- LaRomeo McKee (Southern Miss)

Legend

- (C) Team captain
- (S) Suspended
- (I) Ineligible
- (W) Walk-on
- Injured
- Current redshirt

Roster
Last update: 19 November 2024

== Schedule and results ==
| Date time, TV | Rank^{#} | Opponent^{#} | Result | Record | Site city, state |
Regular season
| November 4, 2024*; 7:00 p.m., ESPN+ | | at Miami (OH); MAC-SBC Challenge | L 48–75 | 0–1 | Millett Hall (442); Oxford, OH |
| November 6, 2024*; 5:00 p.m., ESPN+ | | Columbia (SC) | W 97–43 | 1–1 | Holmes Center (287); Boone, NC |
| November 16, 2024*; 3:30 p.m., ESPN+ | | at UNC Greensboro | L 55–68 | 1–2 | Fleming Gymnasium (528); Greensboro, NC |
| November 20, 2024*; 6:30 p.m., ESPN+ | | Clinton (SC) | W 101–44 | 2–2 | Holmes Center (262); Boone, NC |
| November 24, 2024*; 3:30 p.m., ESPN+ | | Richmond | L 61–73 | 2–3 | Holmes Center (417); Boone, NC |
| November 27, 2024*; 6:30 p.m., ESPN+ | | Gardner–Webb | W 82–64 | 3–3 | Holmes Center (392); Boone, NC |
| December 1, 2024*; 3:00 p.m., SECN+ | | at Vanderbilt | L 40–94 | 3–4 | Memorial Gymnasium (2,621); Nashville, TN |
| December 7, 2024*; 6:00 p.m., ESPN+ | | at Wofford | L 63–71 | 3–5 | Jerry Richardson Indoor Stadium (440); Spartanburg, SC |
| December 17, 2024*; 7:00 p.m., FloSports | | at Charleston | L 47–83 | 3–6 | TD Arena (221); Charleston, SC |
| December 21, 2024*; 2:00 p.m., ESPN+ | | at Mercer | W 74–61 | 4–6 | Hawkins Arena (319); Macon, GA |
| December 29, 2024; 2:00 p.m., ESPN+ | | Arkansas State | W 77–62 | 5–6 (1–0) | Holmes Center (604); Boone, NC |
| January 2, 2025; 3:00 p.m., ESPN+ | | at South Alabama | W 82–67 | 6–6 (2–0) | Mitchell Center (281); Mobile, AL |
| January 4, 2025; 3:00 p.m., ESPN+ | | at Southern Miss | W 76–56 | 7–6 (3–0) | Reed Green Coliseum (1,166); Hattiesburg, MS |
| January 9, 2025; 12:00 p.m., ESPN+ | | Troy | L 68–85 | 7–7 (3–1) | Holmes Center (486); Boone, NC |
| January 11, 2025; 3:30 p.m., ESPN+ | | Coastal Carolina | W 63–60 | 8–7 (4–1) | Holmes Center (468); Boone, NC |
| January 15, 2025; 6:30 p.m., ESPN+ | | at Old Dominion | L 71–78 | 8–8 (4–2) | Chartway Arena (1,513); Norfolk, VA |
| January 18, 2025; 1:00 p.m., ESPN+ | | at Marshall | W 68–64 | 9–8 (5–2) | Cam Henderson Center (1,533); Huntington, WV |
| January 23, 2025; 6:30 p.m., ESPN+ | | Old Dominion | W 74–66 | 10–8 (6–2) | Holmes Center (654); Boone, NC |
| January 25, 2025; 2:00 p.m., ESPN+ | | Georgia Southern | W 60–56 | 11–8 (7–2) | Holmes Center (660); Boone, NC |
| January 30, 2025; 6:30 p.m., ESPN+ | | Louisiana | W 61–52 | 12–8 (8–2) | Holmes Center (354); Boone, NC |
| February 1, 2025; 3:30 p.m., ESPN+ | | Georgia State | L 55–62 | 12–9 (8–3) | Holmes Center (1,212); Boone, NC |
| February 5, 2025; 6:30 p.m., ESPN+ | | at Louisiana–Monroe | W 73–71 | 13–9 (9–3) | Fant–Ewing Coliseum (941); Monroe, LA |
| February 8, 2025; 2:00 p.m., ESPN+ | | Northern Illinois; MAC-SBC Challenge | L 62–75 | 13–10 | Holmes Center (531); Boone, NC |
| February 13, 2025; 5:00 p.m., ESPN+ | | at James Madison | L 61–77 | 13–11 (9–4) | Atlantic Union Bank Center (2,108); Harrisonburg, VA |
| February 15, 2025; 5:00 p.m., ESPN+ | | at Georgia State | L 50–53 | 13–12 (9–5) | GSU Convocation Center (1,720); Atlanta, GA |
| February 19, 2025; 6:30 p.m., ESPN+ | | Marshall | L 58–76 | 13–13 (9–6) | Holmes Center (497); Boone, NC |
| February 22, 2025; 3:30 p.m., ESPN+ | | James Madison | L 57–83 | 13–14 (9–7) | Holmes Center (1,129); Boone, NC |
| February 26, 2025; 6:00 p.m., ESPN+ | | at Georgia Southern | L 55–57 | 13–15 (9–8) | Hill Convocation Center (522); Statesboro, GA |
| February 28, 2025; 5:00 p.m., ESPN+ | | at Coastal Carolina | L 51–88 | 13–16 (9–9) | HTC Center (851); Conway, SC |
Sun Belt tournament
| March 7, 2025; 3:00 p.m., ESPN+ | (6) | vs. (11) Marshall; Fourth Round | L 66–75 | 13–17 | Pensacola Bay Center; Pensacola, FL |
*Non-conference game. ^{#}Rankings from AP Poll. (#) Tournament seedings in parentheses. All times are in Eastern Time.

== See also ==
- 2024–25 Appalachian State Mountaineers men's basketball team
