= 2024–25 Coastal Carolina Chanticleers women's basketball team =

Intercollegiate basketball season

2024–25 Coastal Carolina Chanticleers women's basketball

WNIT, First Round
- Conference: Sun Belt Conference
- Record: 23–9 (12–6 Sun Belt)
- Head coach: Kevin Pederson (3rd season)
- Assistant coaches: DeCole Shoemate Robertson; Darius Carter; Tatum Burstrom
- Home arena: HTC Center

2024–25 Sun Belt Conference women's basketball standings
	Conf.				Overall
Team	W		L	PCT	W		L	PCT
James Madison	18	–	0	1.000	30	–	6	.833
Arkansas State †	15	–	3	.833	21	–	11	.656
Troy	13	–	5	.722	24	–	14	.632
Coastal Carolina	12	–	6	.667	23	–	9	.719
Old Dominion	9	–	9	.500	18	–	16	.529
Appalachian State	9	–	9	.500	13	–	17	.433
Louisiana	9	–	9	.500	13	–	16	.448
Georgia State	8	–	10	.444	17	–	16	.515
Louisiana–Monroe	7	–	11	.389	11	–	19	.367
Texas State	7	–	11	.389	13	–	17	.433
Marshall	6	–	12	.333	15	–	20	.429
Georgia Southern	6	–	12	.333	16	–	18	.471
Southern Miss	5	–	13	.278	10	–	21	.323
South Alabama	2	–	16	.111	6	–	24	.200
† 2025 Sun Belt tournament winner

The 2024–25 Coastal Carolina Chanticleers women's basketball team represented Coastal Carolina University during the 2024–25 NCAA Division I women's basketball season. The team, led by third-year head coach Kevin Pederson, play all home games at the HTC Center in Conway, South Carolina, along with the men's basketball team. They are members of the Sun Belt Conference.

== Preseason ==
On October 14, 2024, the Sun Belt Conference released their preseason coaches poll. Coastal Carolina was picked to finish ninth in the Sun Belt regular season.

=== Preseason rankings ===
Sun Belt preseason poll
Predicted finish	Team	Votes (1st place)
1	James Madison	191 (12)
2	Troy	169 (2)
3	Old Dominion	167
4	Louisiana–Monroe	150
5	Louisiana	122
6	Marshall	118
7	Southern Miss	113
8	Georgia State	107
9	Coastal Carolina	77
10	Texas State	67
11	Appalachian State	61
12	Georgia Southern	53
13	Arkansas State	50
14	South Alabama	25

=== Preseason All-Sun Belt Teams ===
Preseason All-Sun Belt teams
Team	Player	Position	Year
Third	Alancia Ramsey	Forward	2nd

== Roster ==
2024–25 Coastal Carolina Chanticleers women's basketball team
Players
Coaches

Pos.	#	Name	Height	Year	Previous school	Hometown
G	0	Mallory Bruce	5 ft 11 in (1.8 m)	Sr	Travelers Rest HS; UNC Asheville	Greenville, SC
G	1	Dalanna Carter	5 ft 6 in (1.68 m)	Fr	Barbers Hill HS	Beach City, TX
G	2	Savannah Brooks	5 ft 9 in (1.75 m)	Jr	Legacy Early College HS; Delaware State	Taneytown, MD
G	3	Anaya Barney	5 ft 10 in (1.78 m)	RS Jr	Cedar Falls HS; Northern Iowa	Cedar Falls, IA
G	4	Dawson Jemerson	5 ft 5 in (1.65 m)	Fr	Red Oak HS	DeSoto, TX
G	5	Kristin Williams	5 ft 8 in (1.73 m)	Sr	Christian HS; UMass	San Diego, CA
F	10	Jaylen Ponder	5 ft 11 in (1.8 m)	Sr	Blanche Ely HS; St. Petersburg	Pompano, FL
G	11	Emilia Tenbrock	6 ft 1 in (1.85 m)	Sr	DJK Don Bosco Bamberg; McNeese	Düsseldorf, Germany
F/C	20	Riley Stack	6 ft 4 in (1.93 m)	So	Wren HS	Piedmont, SC
C	22	Martina Lopez	6 ft 2 in (1.88 m)	Fr	School Sant Gabriel Ripollet	Ripollet, Spain
G	23	Jaidyn Koerdt	5 ft 11 in (1.8 m)	So	Pulaski Academy; Eastern Florida State College	Providence, AR
G	24	Jayden Marable	5 ft 6 in (1.68 m)	GS	Bolingbrook HS; Northern Illinois	Bolingbrook, IL
F	32	Alancia Ramsey	6 ft 0 in (1.83 m)	So	St. Thomas Aquinas HS	Delray Beach, FL

Head coach

- Kevin Pederson (Clemson)

Assistant coach(es)

- DeCole Shoemate Robertson (Liberty)
- Darius Carter (Tusculum)
- Tatum Burstrom (Carson–Newman)

Legend

- (C) Team captain
- (S) Suspended
- (I) Ineligible
- (W) Walk-on
- Injured
- Current redshirt

Roster
Last update: November 5, 2024

== Schedule ==
Date time, TV	Rank^{#}	Opponent^{#}	Result	Record	High points	High rebounds	High assists	Site city, state
Regular season
November 4, 2024*; 6:30 p.m., ESPN+		at Central Michigan; MAC-SBC Challenge	W 65–62	1–0	17 – Brooks	10 – Lawson	6 – Marable	McGuirk Arena (1,080); Mount Pleasant, MI
November 10, 2024*; 1:00 p.m.		at Charleston Southern	W 97–53	2–0	13 – Brooks	7 – Marable	4 – Adamson	Buccaneer Field House (431); Charleston, SC
November 13, 2024*; 6:00 p.m., ESPN+		UNC Greensboro	W 69–62	3–0	16 – Bruce	9 – Brooks	5 – Brooks	HTC Center (858); Conway, SC
November 15, 2024*; 6:00 p.m., ESPN+		Union College (Ky.)	W 105–43	4–0	20 – Brooks	8 – Pirkle	4 – Tenbrock	HTC Center (775); Conway, SC
November 21, 2024*; 5:00 p.m., ACCNX		at No. 20 NC State	L 68–89	4–1	22 – Brooks	7 – Brooks	3 – Brooks	Reynolds Coliseum (4,206); Raleigh, NC
November 27, 2024*; 3:00 p.m., ESPN+		Coker	W 82–63	5–1	20 – Brooks	13 – Ramsey	7 – Marable	HTC Center (536); Conway, SC
December 7, 2024*; 1:00 p.m., ESPN+		Jacksonville State	W 55–44	6–1	18 – Brooks	6 – Williams	5 – Williams	HTC Center (670); Conway, SC
December 15, 2024*; 2:00 p.m.		at Presbyterian	W 73–46	7–1	16 – Williams	5 – Bruce	4 – Jemerson	Templeton Physical Education Center (368); Clinton, SC
December 18, 2024*; 6:00 p.m., ESPN+		UNC Wilmington	W 96–64	8–1	23 – Bruce	8 – Ponder	10 – Marable	HTC Center (655); Conway, SC
December 21, 2024*; 1:00 p.m., ESPN+		South Carolina State	W 104–58	9–1	24 – Brooks	8 – Ponder	7 – Tied	HTC Center; Conway, SC
December 29, 2024; 1:00 p.m., ESPN+		Louisiana–Monroe	W 63–61	10–1 (1–0)	15 – Ponder	9 – Ponder	3 – Tied	HTC Center (735); Conway, SC
January 2, 2025; 7:00 p.m., ESPN+		at Troy	L 84-92 ^{OT}	10-2 (1-1)	17 – Marable	13 – Ramsey	4 – Tied	Trojan Arena (1,324); Troy, AL
January 4, 2025; 3:00 p.m., ESPN+		at South Alabama	W 73-58	11-2 (2-1)	18 – Ramsey	10 – Tied	5 – Marable	Mitchell Center (528); Mobile, AL
January 8, 2025; 6:30 p.m., ESPN+		at Old Dominion	W 80-77	12-2 (3-1)	17 – Tied	11 – Ramsey	5 – Tied	Chartway Arena (1,422); Norfolk, VA
January 11, 2025; 3:30 p.m., ESPN+		at Appalachian State	L 60-63	12-3 (3-2)	16 – Ramsey	7 – Ponder	3 – Tied	Holmes Center (468); Boone, NC
January 16, 2025; 11:00 a.m., ESPN+		Georgia State	W 83-68	13-3 (4-2)	26 – Brooks	10 – Brooks	5 – Williams	HTC Center (1,295); Conway, SC
January 18, 2025; 1:00 p.m., ESPN+		James Madison	L 54-74	13-4 (4-3)	15 – Ramsey	10 – Ramsey	2 – Tied	HTC Center (941); Conway, SC
January 22, 2025; 6:30 p.m., ESPN+		at Georgia State	L 72-75	13-5 (4-4)	20 – Williams	6 – Ramey	7 – Marable	GSU Convocation Center (9,085); Atlanta, GA
January 25, 2025; 2:00 p.m., ESPN+		at James Madison	L 69-76	13-6 (4-5)	20 – Marable	13 – Ramsey	1 – Tied	Atlantic Union Bank Center (2,396); Harrisonburg, VA
January 29, 2025; 6:00 p.m., ESPN+		Marshall	W 76-64	14-6 (5-5)	19 – Williams	10 – Ramsey	5 – Bruce	HTC Center (828); Conway, SC
February 1, 2025; 1:00 p.m., ESPN+		Louisiana	W 77-68	15-6 (6-5)	16 – Tied	10 – Bruce	4 – Tied	HTC Center (974); Conway, SC
February 5, 2025; 8:00 p.m., ESPN+		at Texas State	W 68-60	16-6 (7-5)	18 – Brooks	12 – Ponder	8 – Marable	Strahan Arena (749); San Marcos, TX
February 8, 2025*; 4:00 p.m., ESPN+		Buffalo; MAC-SBC Challenge	W 73-65	17-6	21 – Williams	11 – Ramsey	4 – Marable	HTC Center (694); Conway, SC
February 12, 2025; 6:00 p.m., ESPN+		at Georgia Southern	W 67-56	18-6 (8-5)	28 – Ramsey	6 – Brooks	4 – Brooks	Hill Convocation Center (634); Statesboro, GA
February 15, 2025; 1:00 p.m., ESPN+		at Marshall	W 66-57	19-6 (9-5)	16 – Ramsey	8 – Ponder	3 – Stack	Cam Henderson Center (1,035); Huntington, WV
February 19, 2025; 6:00 p.m., ESPN+		Georgia Southern	W 64-58	20-6 (10-5)	18 – Williams	6 – Ponder	4 – Tied	HTC Center (1,196); Conway, SC
February 22, 2025; 1:00 p.m., ESPN+		Arkansas State	W 86-70	21-6 (11-5)	23 – Marable	13 – Ponder	8 – Marable	HTC Center (686); Conway, SC
February 26, 2025; 5:00 p.m., ESPN+		Old Dominion	L 65-81	21-7 (11-6)	12 – Marable	8 – Barney	2 – Stack	HTC Center (886); Conway, SC
February 28, 2025; 5:00 p.m., ESPN+		Appalachian State	W 88-51	22-7 (12-6)	15 – Tenbrock	7 – Tenbrock	5 – Brooks	HTC Center (851); Conway, SC
Sun Belt tournament
March 8, 2025; 1:00 p.m., ESPN+	(4)	vs. (8) Georgia State; Quarterfinals	W 77–68	23–7	18 – Ramsey	10 – Ramsey	3 – Tied	Pensacola Bay Center (604); Pensacola, FL
March 9, 2025; 11:30 a.m., ESPN+	(4)	vs. (1) James Madison; Semifinals	L 65–89	23–8	13 – Williams	6 – Ponder	2 – Stack	Pensacola Bay Center (717); Pensacola, FL
WNIT
March 20, 2025*; 6:00 p.m., ESPN+		Campbell; First Round	L 55–57	23–9	10 – Tied	6 – Brooks	3 – Marable	HTC Center (667); Conway, SC
*Non-conference game. ^{#}Rankings from AP poll. (#) Tournament seedings in parentheses. All times are in Eastern.

== See also ==
- 2024–25 Coastal Carolina Chanticleers men's basketball team
