= 2024–25 Georgia State Panthers women's basketball team =

American college basketball season

2024–25 Georgia State Panthers women's basketball
- Conference: Sun Belt Conference
- Record: 17–16 (8–10 Sun Belt)
- Head coach: Gene Hill (7th season)
- Assistant coaches: Jon Bollier; Shanasa Sanders; Patechia Hartman
- Home arena: GSU Convocation Center

2024–25 Sun Belt Conference women's basketball standings
	Conf.				Overall
Team	W		L	PCT	W		L	PCT
James Madison	18	–	0	1.000	30	–	6	.833
Arkansas State †	15	–	3	.833	21	–	11	.656
Troy	13	–	5	.722	24	–	14	.632
Coastal Carolina	12	–	6	.667	23	–	9	.719
Old Dominion	9	–	9	.500	18	–	16	.529
Appalachian State	9	–	9	.500	13	–	17	.433
Louisiana	9	–	9	.500	13	–	16	.448
Georgia State	8	–	10	.444	17	–	16	.515
Louisiana–Monroe	7	–	11	.389	11	–	19	.367
Texas State	7	–	11	.389	13	–	17	.433
Marshall	6	–	12	.333	15	–	20	.429
Georgia Southern	6	–	12	.333	16	–	18	.471
Southern Miss	5	–	13	.278	10	–	21	.323
South Alabama	2	–	16	.111	6	–	24	.200
† 2025 Sun Belt tournament winner

The 2024–25 Georgia State Panthers women's basketball team represented Georgia State University during the 2024–25 NCAA Division I women's basketball season. The Panthers, led by seventh-year head coach Gene Hill, played their home games at the GSU Convocation Center in Atlanta, Georgia as members of the Sun Belt Conference.

The Panthers finished the season 17–16, 8–10 in Sun Belt play, to finish in eighth place. In the Sun Belt tournament, they defeated Georgia Southern and Old Dominion in the third and fourth rounds, respectively, before being eliminated by Coastal Carolina in the quarterfinals.

== Previous season ==
The Panthers finished the 2023–24 season 15–15, 9–9 in Sun Belt play, to finish in a tie for eighth place. They were defeated by Appalachian State in the second round of the Sun Belt tournament.

== Preseason ==
On October 14, 2024, the Sun Belt Conference released their preseason coaches poll. Georgia State was picked to finish eighth in the Sun Belt regular season.

=== Preseason rankings ===
Sun Belt preseason poll
Predicted finish	Team	Votes (1st place)
1	James Madison	191 (12)
2	Troy	169 (2)
3	Old Dominion	167
4	Louisiana–Monroe	150
5	Louisiana	122
6	Marshall	118
7	Southern Miss	113
8	Georgia State	107
9	Coastal Carolina	77
10	Texas State	67
11	Appalachian State	61
12	Georgia Southern	53
13	Arkansas State	50
14	South Alabama	25

=== Preseason All-Sun Belt Teams ===
Preseason All-Sun Belt teams
Team	Player	Position	Year
First	Crystal Henderson	Guard	Sophomore
First	Mikyla Tolivert	Guard	Senior

== Roster ==
2024–25 Georgia State Panthers women's basketball team
Players
Coaches

Pos.	#	Name	Height	Year	Previous school	Hometown
G	0	Morgan Robinson-Nwagwu	5 ft 8 in (1.73 m)	GS	UCF	Norcross, GA
F	1	Patience Williams	5 ft 11 in (1.8 m)	Jr	South Florida	Minneapolis, MN
G	2	Mikyla Tolivert	5 ft 6 in (1.68 m)	Sr	Palm Bay Magnet High School	Melbourne, FL
F	4	Monna Julkunen	6 ft 1 in (1.85 m)	Fr	Rabun Gap-Nacoochee School	Vantaa, Finland
G	5	Eghosa Obasuyi	5 ft 5 in (1.65 m)	So	Carrollton High School	Villa Rica, GA
F	10	Eden Johnson	6 ft 2 in (1.88 m)	GS	Georgia Southern	Kissimmee, FL
G	13	Cheyenne Holloman	5 ft 8 in (1.73 m)	Sr	Northwest Florida State College	Marietta, GA
G	20	Clara Rosini	5 ft 10 in (1.78 m)	RS Sr	McNeese	Trieste, Italy
G	21	Erin Turral	5 ft 6 in (1.68 m)	Sr	Stony Brook	Tallahassee, FL
G	22	Mya Williams	5 ft 7 in (1.7 m)	Sr	Hutchinson Community College	Waxahachie, TX
F	25	Mahogany Matthews	6 ft 1 in (1.85 m)	GS	Marshall	York, PA
G	30	Crystal Henderson	5 ft 5 in (1.65 m)	So	Kell High School	Marietta, GA
G	31	Kaleigh Addie	5 ft 6 in (1.68 m)	Jr	Xavier	Atlanta, GA
G	33	Frankee Payne	5 ft 3 in (1.6 m)	Fr	South Gwinnett High School	Snellville, GA
F	44	Aaliyah Hunt	6 ft 3 in (1.91 m)	So	Peachtree Ridge High School	Lawrenceville, GA

Head coach

- Gene Hill (Coker)

Assistant coach(es)

- Jon Bollier (Samford)
- Shanasa Sanders (Stetson)
- Patechia Hartman (Georgia State)

Legend

- (C) Team captain
- (S) Suspended
- (I) Ineligible
- (W) Walk-on
- Injured
- Current redshirt

Roster
Last update: March 15, 2025

== Schedule and results ==
Date time, TV	Rank^{#}	Opponent^{#}	Result	Record	High points	High rebounds	High assists	Site (attendance) city, state
Non-conference regular season
November 4, 2024*; 6:00 p.m., ESPN+		at Akron; MAC–Sun Belt Challenge	L 73–81	0–1	20 – Henderson	8 – Johnson	4 – Tolivert	James A. Rhodes Arena (334); Akron, OH
November 8, 2024*; 7:00 p.m., ACCNX		at Georgia Tech	L 47–67	0–2	11 – Tolivert	12 – P. Williams	3 – Henderson	McCamish Pavilion (1,437); Atlanta, GA
November 10, 2024*; 2:00 p.m., ESPN+		Berry	W 79–57	1–2	22 – Addie	11 – Johnson	5 – Henderson	GSU Convocation Center (435); Atlanta, GA
November 14, 2024*; 6:00 p.m., SECN+		at Georgia	W 66–60	2–2	23 – Tolivert	5 – 2 tied	5 – Henderson	Stegeman Coliseum (1,472); Athens, GA
November 19, 2024*; 6:30 p.m., ESPN+		Western Carolina	W 68–64	3–2	15 – 2 tied	7 – Julkunen	4 – 2 tied	GSU Convocation Center (287); Atlanta, GA
November 26, 2024*; 12:00 p.m., ESPN+		Purdue Fort Wayne; GSU Thanksgiving Tournament	W 57–56	4–2	17 – Tolivert	12 – P. Williams	3 – 2 tied	GSU Convocation Center (285); Atlanta, GA
November 27, 2024*; 12:00 p.m., ESPN+		Furman; GSU Thanksgiving Tournament	L 74–85	4–3	19 – Tolivert	6 – P. Williams	7 – Henderson	GSU Convocation Center (320); Atlanta, GA
November 28, 2024*; 12:00 p.m., ESPN+		Campbell; GSU Thanksgiving Tournament	W 58–43	5–3	17 – Matthews	8 – Matthews	6 – Henderson	GSU Convocation Center (285); Atlanta, GA
December 2, 2024*; 12:00 p.m., SECN+		at No. 19 Alabama	L 49–98	5–4	10 – Tolivert	3 – 3 tied	3 – Henderson	Coleman Coliseum (3,125); Tuscaloosa, AL
December 8, 2024*; 2:00 p.m., ESPN+		Sewanee	W 107–49	6–4	20 – Obasuyi	13 – Rosini	6 – Henderson	GSU Convocation Center (459); Atlanta, GA
December 19, 2024*; 7:00 p.m., ESPN+		at Kennesaw State	L 62–65	6–5	15 – Tolivert	8 – P. Williams	3 – Tolivert	KSU Convocation Center (658); Kennesaw, GA
Sun Belt regular season
December 29, 2024; 2:00 p.m., ESPN+		Southern Miss	L 59–73	6–6 (0–1)	16 – Matthews	6 – Matthews	4 – 2 tied	GSU Convocation Center (1,384); Atlanta, GA
January 2, 2025; 8:00 p.m., ESPN+		at Texas State	W 59–51	7–6 (1–1)	17 – Tolivert	8 – Matthews	3 – Henderson	Strahan Arena (618); San Marcos, TX
January 4, 2025; 2:00 p.m., ESPN+		at Louisiana	L 50–68	7–7 (1–2)	9 – M. Williams	7 – P. Williams	6 – Henderson	Cajundome (616); Lafayette, LA
January 8, 2025; 5:30 p.m., ESPN+		Georgia Southern; Modern Day Hate	L 57–82	7–8 (1–3)	15 – Obasuyi	7 – 2 tied	2 – 4 tied	GSU Convocation Center (1,297); Atlanta, GA
January 11, 2025; 1:00 p.m., ESPN+		Troy	L 72–80	7–9 (1–4)	18 – P. Williams	7 – P. Williams	4 – Henderson	GSU Convocation Center (1,223); Atlanta, GA
January 16, 2025; 11:00 a.m., ESPN+		at Coastal Carolina	L 68–83	7–10 (1–5)	15 – M. Williams	6 – Matthews	4 – Henderson	HTC Center (1,295); Conway, SC
January 18, 2025; 1:00 p.m., ESPN+		at Georgia Southern; Modern Day Hate	W 88–83 ^{3OT}	8–10 (2–5)	21 – Henderson	8 – Tolivert	7 – Henderson	Hill Convocation Center (813); Statesboro, GA
January 22, 2025; 3:00 p.m., ESPN+		Coastal Carolina	W 75–72	9–10 (3–5)	24 – M. Williams	9 – Tolivert	9 – Henderson	GSU Convocation Center (9,085); Atlanta, GA
January 25, 2025; 1:00 p.m., ESPN+		Old Dominion	L 57–64	9–11 (3–6)	14 – Tolivert	6 – Tolivert	7 – Henderson	GSU Convocation Center (1,690); Atlanta, GA
January 29, 2025; 6:30 p.m., ESPN+		at Old Dominion	W 66–62	10–11 (4–6)	20 – Addie	7 – Henderson	3 – Henderson	Chartway Arena (2,502); Norfolk, VA
February 1, 2025; 3:30 p.m., ESPN+		at Appalachian State	W 62–55	11–11 (5–6)	17 – Tolivert	10 – Tolivert	4 – 2 tied	Holmes Center (1,212); Boone, NC
February 5, 2025; 12:00 p.m., ESPN+		at Arkansas State	L 50–86	11–12 (5–7)	10 – Tolivert	7 – Tolivert	3 – 2 tied	First National Bank Arena (3,891); Jonesboro, AR
February 8, 2025*; 2:00 p.m., ESPN+		Eastern Michigan; MAC–Sun Belt Challenge	W 55–43	12–12	15 – Tolivert	7 – Tolivert	3 – Henderson	GSU Convocation Center (1,444); Atlanta, GA
February 13, 2025; 11:00 a.m., ESPN+		South Alabama	W 78–69 ^{2OT}	13–12 (6–7)	26 – Tolivert	7 – P. Williams	5 – Tolivert	GSU Convocation Center (2,849); Atlanta, GA
February 15, 2025; 5:00 p.m., ESPN+		Appalachian State	W 53–50	14–12 (7–7)	16 – Tolivert	7 – 2 tied	4 – Henderson	GSU Convocation Center (1,720); Atlanta, GA
February 19, 2025; 6:30 p.m., ESPN+		James Madison	L 55–62	14–13 (7–8)	18 – Henderson	4 – 3 tied	4 – Henderson	GSU Convocation Center (1,302); Atlanta, GA
February 22, 2025; 2:00 p.m., ESPN+		Marshall	L 59–70	14–14 (7–9)	16 – Henderson	8 – Matthews	4 – Tolivert	GSU Convocation Center (1,552); Atlanta, GA
February 26, 2025; 7:00 p.m., ESPN+		at James Madison	L 74–80	14–15 (7–10)	25 – Henderson	8 – Tolivert	3 – Henderson	Atlantic Union Bank Center (2,270); Harrisonburg, VA
February 28, 2025; 6:00 p.m., ESPN+		at Marshall	W 70–68	15–15 (8–10)	15 – Henderson	8 – 2 tied	3 – 2 tied	Cam Henderson Center (1,576); Huntington, WV
Sun Belt tournament
March 6, 2025; 12:30 p.m., ESPN+	(8)	vs. (12) Georgia Southern; Third round	W 70–64	16–15	20 – Tolivert	9 – Tolivert	3 – Tolivert	Pensacola Bay Center (406); Pensacola, FL
March 7, 2025; 12:30 p.m., ESPN+	(8)	vs. (5) Old Dominion; Fourth round	W 65–62	17–15	32 – Henderson	10 – Tolivert	1 – 4 tied	Pensacola Bay Center (538); Pensacola, FL
March 8, 2025; 1:00 p.m., ESPN+	(8)	vs. (4) Coastal Carolina; Quarterfinals	L 68–77	17–16	26 – Tolivert	7 – 2 tied	7 – Henderson	Pensacola Bay Center (604); Pensacola, FL
*Non-conference game. ^{#}Rankings from AP poll. (#) Tournament seedings in parentheses. All times are in Eastern.
