= 2024–25 Louisiana Ragin' Cajuns women's basketball team =

American college basketball season

2024–25 Louisiana Ragin' Cajuns women's basketball
- Conference: Sun Belt Conference
- Record: 13–16 (9–9 Sun Belt)
- Head coach: Garry Brodhead (13th season)
- Associate head coach: Deacon Jones
- Assistant coaches: M.C. Vogt; Adrian Sanders; Jonas Richard
- Home arena: Cajundome

2024–25 Sun Belt Conference women's basketball standings
	Conf.				Overall
Team	W		L	PCT	W		L	PCT
James Madison	18	–	0	1.000	30	–	6	.833
Arkansas State †	15	–	3	.833	21	–	11	.656
Troy	13	–	5	.722	24	–	14	.632
Coastal Carolina	12	–	6	.667	23	–	9	.719
Old Dominion	9	–	9	.500	18	–	16	.529
Appalachian State	9	–	9	.500	13	–	17	.433
Louisiana	9	–	9	.500	13	–	16	.448
Georgia State	8	–	10	.444	17	–	16	.515
Louisiana–Monroe	7	–	11	.389	11	–	19	.367
Texas State	7	–	11	.389	13	–	17	.433
Marshall	6	–	12	.333	15	–	20	.429
Georgia Southern	6	–	12	.333	16	–	18	.471
Southern Miss	5	–	13	.278	10	–	21	.323
South Alabama	2	–	16	.111	6	–	24	.200
† 2025 Sun Belt tournament winner

The 2024–25 Louisiana Ragin' Cajuns women's basketball team represented the University of Louisiana at Lafayette during the 2024–25 NCAA Division I women's basketball season. The Ragin' Cajuns, led by thirteenth-year head coach Garry Brodhead, played their home games at the Cajundome. They were competing as members of the Sun Belt Conference.

== Previous season ==
The Louisiana finished the 2023–24 season 17–14, 10–8 in the Sun Belt play to finish in a tie for fifth place. They were defeated by 3rd-seeded James Madison in the semifinals of the Sun Belt tournament.

== Preseason ==
On October 14, 2024, the Sun Belt Conference released their preseason coaches poll. Louisiana was picked to finish fifth in the Sun Belt regular season.

=== Preseason rankings ===
Sun Belt preseason poll
Predicted finish	Team	Votes (1st place)
1	James Madison	191 (12)
2	Troy	169 (2)
3	Old Dominion	167
4	Louisiana–Monroe	150
5	Louisiana	122
6	Marshall	118
7	Southern Miss	113
8	Georgia State	107
9	Coastal Carolina	77
10	Texas State	67
11	Appalachian State	61
12	Georgia Southern	53
13	Arkansas State	50
14	South Alabama	25

=== Preseason All-Sun Belt Teams ===
Preseason All-Sun Belt teams
Team	Player	Position	Year
Second	Jaylyn James	Guard	3rd

== Roster ==
2024–25 Louisiana Ragin' Cajuns women's basketball team
Players
Coaches

Pos.	#	Name	Height	Year	Previous school	Hometown
F	00	Ashlyn Jones	6 ft 0 in (1.83 m)	Sr	Klein Oak High School	Houston, Texas
G	1	Tamiah Robinson	5 ft 9 in (1.75 m)	GS	Utah State	Philadelphia, Pennsylvania
G	2	RyAnne Walters	5 ft 7 in (1.7 m)	GS	UC Riverside	Sacramento, California
G	3	Nubia Benedith	5 ft 8 in (1.73 m)	GS	North Florida	Palm Bay, Florida
G	4	Lanay Wheaton	5 ft 7 in (1.7 m)	GS	Old Dominion	Hope, Arkansas
G	10	Aasia Sam	5 ft 11 in (1.8 m)	Sr	Louisiana–Monroe	Lake Charles, Louisiana
G	13	Dacia Jones	6 ft 0 in (1.83 m)	So	Lafayette Christian Academy	Lafayette, Louisiana
F	15	Uniyah Franklin	6 ft 2 in (1.88 m)	So	Everglades High School	Pompano Beach, Florida
G	20	Erica Lafayette	6 ft 0 in (1.83 m)	GS	Rutgers	Baton Rouge, Louisiana
G	22	Jaylyn James	5 ft 8 in (1.73 m)	Jr	Mandeville High School	Madisonville, Louisiana
G/F	23	Jasmine Matthews	5 ft 11 in (1.8 m)	So	East St. John High School	LaPlace, Louisiana
F	24	Charlotte Carvalho	6 ft 2 in (1.88 m)	Jr	Grayson College	Dakar, Senegal
F	25	Skylah Travis	6 ft 3 in (1.91 m)	GS	Missouri	Weldon, North Carolina
F	34	Kamryn Jones	6 ft 1 in (1.85 m)	GS	Houston	Magnolia, Texas

Head coach

- Garry Brodhead (Louisiana)

Assistant coach(es)

- Deacon Jones (Louisiana)
- M.C. Vogt (Texas A&M)
- Adrian Sanders (Southern)
- Jonas Richard (Tougaloo)

Legend

- (C) Team captain
- (S) Suspended
- (I) Ineligible
- (W) Walk-on
- Injured
- Current redshirt

Roster
Last update: March 2, 2025

== Schedule and results ==
Date time, TV	Rank^{#}	Opponent^{#}	Result	Record	High points	High rebounds	High assists	Site city, state
Exhibition
October 30, 2024*; 5:00 p.m.		Centenary	W 86–23		21 – K. Jones	12 – K. Jones	10 – Robinson	Cajundome (212); Lafayette, LA
Regular season
November 4, 2024*; 11:00 a.m., ESPN+		at Northern Illinois; MAC-SBC Challenge	L 55–57	0–1	17 – Wheaton	12 – Robinson	3 – Robinson	NIU Convocation Center; DeKalb, IL
November 8, 2024*; 6:00 p.m., ESPN+		Loyola (LA)	W 74–50	1–1	24 – Lafayette	9 – A. Jones	4 – Wheaton	Cajundome (310); Lafayette, LA
November 19, 2024*; 5:00 p.m., ESPN+		Mobile	Canceled (Note: Game was canceled with travel issues with Mobile.)					Cajundome; Lafayette, LA
November 22, 2024*; 6:00 p.m., ESPN+		Nicholls	W 60–55	2–1	16 – James	12 – K. Jones	2 – Tied	Cajundome (417); Lafayette, LA
November 26, 2024*; 6:00 p.m., ESPN+		New Orleans	W 61–46	3–1	22 – Robinson	6 – Robinson	4 – Walters	Cajundome (524); Lafayette, LA
November 29, 2024*; 11:00 a.m., YouTube		vs. Cleveland State; Big Easy Classic	L 42–60	3–2	12 – James	8 – Robinson	2 – Benedith	Alario Center (104); Westwego, LA
November 30, 2024*; 11:00 a.m., YouTube		vs. Minnesota; Big Easy Classic	L 48–68	3–3	11 – K. Jones	6 – A. Jones	1 – Tied	Alario Center (132); Westwego, LA
December 7, 2024*; 12:00 p.m., ESPN+		Rice	W 64–54	4–3	20 – Lafayette	12 – James	3 – Wheaton	Cajundome (352); Lafayette, LA
December 15, 2024*; 2:00 p.m., SECN+		at No. 4 LSU	L 57–85	4–4	15 – Robinson	5 – A. Jones	4 – Lafayette	Pete Maravich Assembly Center (11,328); Baton Rouge, LA
December 18, 2024*; 11:00 a.m., ESPN+		Auburn	L 51–68	4–5	12 – Tied	6 – Lafayette	1 – Tied	Cajundome (5,877); Lafayette, LA
Exhibition
December 27, 2024*; 4:00 p.m.		Dillard	W 63–43		18 – Matthews	10 – Lafayette	5 – Robinson	Cajundome (243); Lafayette, LA
Regular season
December 29, 2024; 12:00 p.m., ESPN+		at Georgia Southern	W 68–47	5–5 (1–0)	17 – Lafayette	9 – Robinson	3 – Robinson	Hill Convocation Center (535); Statesboro, GA
January 2, 2025; 6:00 p.m., ESPN+		James Madison	L 63–68	5–6 (1–1)	18 – Lafayette	8 – Lafayette	3 – Wheaton	Cajundome (511); Lafayette, LA
January 4, 2025; 1:00 p.m., ESPN+		Georgia State	W 68–50	6–6 (2–1)	24 – Lafayette	7 – Sam	3 – Tied	Cajundome (618); Lafayette, LA
January 9, 2025; 5:00 p.m., ESPN+		at South Alabama	W 76–50	7–6 (3–1)	22 – Robinson	8 – K. Jones	4 – Robinson	Mitchell Center (488); Mobile, AL
January 11, 2025; 2:00 p.m., ESPN+		Southern Miss	W 77–68	8–6 (4–1)	19 – Lafayette	5 – A. Jones	4 – Robinson	Cajundome (569); Lafayette, LA
January 15, 2025; 7:00 p.m., ESPN+		at Arkansas State	L 65–67 ^{OT}	8–7 (4–2)	20 – Benedith	7 – Tied	2 – Tied	First National Bank Arena (713); Jonesboro, AR
January 18, 2025; 3:30 p.m., ESPN+		at Troy	L 73–81	8–8 (4–3)	21 – Robinson	8 – TEAM	5 – Benedith	Trojan Arena (1,594); Troy, AL
January 23, 2025; 6:00 p.m., ESPN+		Arkansas State	L 49–62	8–9 (4–4)	21 – Lafayette	9 – TEAM	3 – Benedith	Cajundome (429); Lafayette, LA
January 25, 2025; 2:00 p.m., ESPN+		Troy	W 70–53	9–9 (5–4)	20 – A. Jones	9 – Travis	4 – Robinson	Cajundome (488); Lafayette, LA
January 30, 2025; 5:30 p.m., ESPN+		at Appalachian State	L 52–61	9–10 (5–5)	22 – Benedith	7 – Tied	2 – Benedith	Holmes Center (354); Boone, NC
February 1, 2025; 12:00 p.m., ESPN+		at Coastal Carolina	L 68–77	9–11 (5–6)	24 – Lafayette	6 – TEAM	3 – Wheaton	HTC Center (974); Conway, SC
February 5, 2025; 6:00 p.m., ESPN+		Marshall	W 92–88 ^{OT}	10–11 (6–6)	26 – Lafayette	11 – Travis	5 – Robinson	Cajundome (313); Lafayette, LA
February 8, 2025*; 2:00 p.m., ESPN+		Miami (OH); MAC-SBC Challenge	L 59–60 ^{OT}	10–12	15 – Benedith	10 – Robinson	2 – Tied	Cajundome (707); Lafayette, LA
February 12, 2025; 5:00 p.m., ESPN+		Texas State	W 71–54	11–12 (7–6)	18 – Robinson	6 – Lafayette	3 – Robinson	Cajundome (421); Lafayette, LA
February 15, 2025; 2:00 p.m., ESPN+		Louisiana–Monroe	W 80–60	12–12 (8–6)	22 – Lafayette	12 – Travis	2 – Robinson	Cajundome (421); Lafayette, LA
February 19, 2025; 5:00 p.m., ESPN+		at Texas State	L 58–69	12–13 (8–7)	15 – Lafayette	8 – Travis	4 – Robinson	Strahan Arena; San Marcos, TX
February 22, 2025; 2:00 p.m., ESPN+		at Louisiana–Monroe	L 58–62	12–14 (8–8)	13 – Tied	9 – Travis	6 – Robinson	Fant–Ewing Coliseum (1,749); Monroe, LA
February 26, 2025; 5:00 p.m., ESPN+		South Alabama	W 55–48	13–14 (9–8)	16 – Benedith	11 – Travis	2 – Robinson	Cajundome (415); Lafayette, LA
February 28, 2025; 5:00 p.m., ESPN+		at Southern Miss	L 53–64	13–15 (9–9)	17 – Lafayette	8 – Robinson	1 – Tied	Reed Green Coliseum; Hattiesburg, MS
Sun Belt tournament
March 6, 2025; 2:00 p.m., ESPN+	(7)	vs. (11) Marshall; Third Round	L 46–48	13–16	13 – Travis	15 – Travis	5 – Robinson	Pensacola Bay Center (448); Pensacola, FL
*Non-conference game. ^{#}Rankings from AP Poll. (#) Tournament seedings in parentheses. All times are in Central.
