= 2024–25 Georgia Southern Eagles women's basketball team =

Intercollegiate basketball season

2024–25 Georgia Southern Eagles women's basketball
- Conference: Sun Belt Conference
- Record: 16–18 (6–12 Sun Belt)
- Head coach: Hana Haden (1st season)
- Assistant coaches: Paul Fessler; Dexter Jenkins; Dee Anderson
- Home arena: Hanner Fieldhouse (Note: Hosted their first two home games); Hill Convocation Center (Note: Hosted their remaining twelve home games)

2024–25 Sun Belt Conference women's basketball standings
	Conf.				Overall
Team	W		L	PCT	W		L	PCT
James Madison	18	–	0	1.000	30	–	6	.833
Arkansas State †	15	–	3	.833	21	–	11	.656
Troy	13	–	5	.722	24	–	14	.632
Coastal Carolina	12	–	6	.667	23	–	9	.719
Old Dominion	9	–	9	.500	18	–	16	.529
Appalachian State	9	–	9	.500	13	–	17	.433
Louisiana	9	–	9	.500	13	–	16	.448
Georgia State	8	–	10	.444	17	–	16	.515
Louisiana–Monroe	7	–	11	.389	11	–	19	.367
Texas State	7	–	11	.389	13	–	17	.433
Marshall	6	–	12	.333	15	–	20	.429
Georgia Southern	6	–	12	.333	16	–	18	.471
Southern Miss	5	–	13	.278	10	–	21	.323
South Alabama	2	–	16	.111	6	–	24	.200
† 2025 Sun Belt tournament winner

The 2024–25 Georgia Southern Eagles women's basketball team represented Georgia Southern University during the 2024–25 NCAA Division I women's basketball season. The Southern Eagles, led by first-year head coach Hana Haden, played their first two home games at the Hanner Fieldhouse in Statesboro, Georgia and finished their remaining home schedule at the nearby Hill Convocation Center following its opening on December 4, 2024. They were members of the Sun Belt Conference.

On March 12, 2024, Anita Howard and Georgia Southern mutually agreed for her to step down as head coach. Georgia Southwestern State (D-II) head coach Hana Haden was hired by the Eagles on March 29.

== Preseason ==
On October 14, 2024, the Sun Belt Conference released their preseason coaches poll. Georgia Southern was picked to finish twelfth in the Sun Belt regular season.

=== Preseason rankings ===
Sun Belt preseason poll
Predicted finish	Team	Votes (1st place)
1	James Madison	191 (12)
2	Troy	169 (2)
3	Old Dominion	167
4	Louisiana–Monroe	150
5	Louisiana	122
6	Marshall	118
7	Southern Miss	113
8	Georgia State	107
9	Coastal Carolina	77
10	Texas State	67
11	Appalachian State	61
12	Georgia Southern	53
13	Arkansas State	50
14	South Alabama	25

== Roster ==
2024–25 Georgia Southern Eagles women's basketball team
Players
Coaches

Pos.	#	Name	Height	Year	Previous school	Hometown
G	0	Bukky Akinsola	5 ft 6 in (1.68 m)	Sr	Immaculate Conception HS; High Point	Hillside, NJ
G/F	1	Tamiria Jones	5 ft 9 in (1.75 m)	Fr	Huffman HS	Birmingham, AL
G	3	Nicole Gwynn	5 ft 7 in (1.7 m)	Sr	Wethersfield HS; Queens	Hartford, CT
G	4	Jazmyne Jackson	5 ft 7 in (1.7 m)	Jr	Braswell HS; Grambling State	Dallas, TX
C	7	Paris Gaines	6 ft 3 in (1.91 m)	So	Jones HS; Kansas	Orlando, FL
G	10	Jamiria Jones	5 ft 9 in (1.75 m)	Fr	Huffman HS	Birmingham, AL
F	12	Liv Fuller	5 ft 10 in (1.78 m)	So	Clearwater HS	Clearwater, FL
F	21	Ashantay Noble	5 ft 10 in (1.78 m)	Fr	Bulloch Academy	Statesboro, GA
F	23	Deannasty Smith	6 ft 1 in (1.85 m)	Jr	Tom C. Clark HS; Northwest Florida State	San Antonio, TX
G	30	McKenna Eddings	6 ft 0 in (1.83 m)	Sr	Warhill HS; Auburn	Williamsburg, VA
F	32	Leah Johnson	6 ft 3 in (1.91 m)		The Pennington School; Georgia Southwestern State	Ewing, NJ
F	34	Indya Green	5 ft 11 in (1.8 m)	Sr	Kickapoo HS; Missouri State	Springfield, MO
G	55	Nakiyah Mays-Prince	5 ft 5 in (1.65 m)	Jr	Example Academy; Delaware	Chicago, IL

Head coach

- Hana Haden (Western Carolina)

Assistant coach(es)

- Paul Fessler (Northern Iowa)
- Dexter Jenkins (North Carolina Central)
- Dee Anderson (Florida)

Legend

- (C) Team captain
- (S) Suspended
- (I) Ineligible
- (W) Walk-on
- Injured
- Current redshirt

Roster
Last update: November 19, 2024

== Schedule and results ==
Date time, TV	Rank^{#}	Opponent^{#}	Result	Record	Site city, state
Regular season
November 4, 2024*; 7:00 p.m., ESPN+		at Ohio; MAC–SBC Challenge	W 82–70	1–0	Convocation Center (679); Athens, OH
November 9, 2024*; 1:00 p.m., ESPN+		at North Florida	W 81–65	2–0	UNF Arena (498); Jacksonville, FL
November 12, 2024*; 6:00 p.m., ESPN+		Bethune–Cookman	W 54–50	3–0	Hanner Fieldhouse (812); Statesboro, GA
November 16, 2024*; 11:00 a.m., ESPN+		Longwood	W 68–60	4–0	Hanner Fieldhouse (503); Statesboro, GA
November 23, 2024*; 12:00 p.m., ESPN+		at George Washington	L 46–56	4–1	Charles E. Smith Center (358); Washington, D.C.
November 29, 2024*; 4:30 p.m., B1G+		vs. Maryland Eastern Shore; Rutgers Battle on the Banks	W 58–47	5–1	Jersey Mike's Arena (1,651); Piscataway, NJ
November 30, 2024*; 2:00 p.m., B1G+		at Rutgers; Rutgers Battle on the Banks	L 60–77	5–2	Jersey Mike's Arena; Piscataway, NJ
December 5, 2024*; 6:00 p.m., ESPN+		Jacksonville	L 51–56	5–3	Hill Convocation Center (924); Statesboro, GA
December 13, 2024*; 11:00 a.m., ESPN+		Coastal Georgia	W 78–46	6–3	Hill Convocation Center (3,925); Statesboro, GA
December 18, 2024*; 2:00 p.m., GCU Lopes Live		vs. Florida Atlantic; GCU Have Fayth Christmas Classic	L 66–71	6–4	Global Credit Union Arena (107); Phoenix, AZ
December 19, 2024*; 2:00 p.m., GCU Lopes Live		vs. Wright State; GCU Have Fayth Christmas Classic	W 88–82	7–4	Global Credit Union Arena (106); Phoenix, AZ
December 21, 2024*; 2:30 p.m., ESPN+		at Grand Canyon; GCU Have Fayth Christmas Classic	L 52–79	7–5	Global Credit Union Arena (512); Phoenix, AZ
December 29, 2024; 1:00 p.m., ESPN+		Louisiana	L 57–68	7–6 (0–1)	Hill Convocation Center (535); Statesboro, GA
January 2, 2025; 7:30 p.m., ESPN+		at Louisiana–Monroe	L 67–83	7–7 (0–2)	Fant–Ewing Coliseum (886); Monroe, LA
January 4, 2025; 3:00 p.m., ESPN+		at Arkansas State	L 73–76	7–8 (0–3)	First National Bank Arena (408); Jonesboro, AR
January 8, 2025; 5:30 p.m., ESPN+		at Georgia State; Rivalry	W 82–57	8–8 (1–3)	GSU Convocation Center (1,297); Atlanta, GA
January 11, 2024; 2:00 p.m., ESPN+		at James Madison	L 68–85	8–9 (1–4)	Atlantic Union Bank Center (2,370); Harrisonburg, VA
January 15, 2025; 6:00 p.m., ESPN+		Texas State	W 69–62	9–9 (2–4)	Hill Convocation Center (573); Statesboro, GA
January 18, 2025; 1:00 p.m., ESPN+		Georgia State; Rivalry	L 83–88 ^{3OT}	9–10 (2–5)	Hill Convocation Center (813); Statesboro, GA
January 22, 2025; 6:00 p.m., ESPN+		at Marshall	L 60–67	9–11 (2–6)	Cam Henderson Center (1,117); Huntington, WV
January 25, 2025; 2:00 p.m., ESPN+		at Appalachian State	L 56–60	9–12 (2–7)	Holmes Center (660); Boone, NC
January 29, 2025; 6:00 p.m., ESPN+		James Madison	L 60–77	9–13 (2–8)	Hill Convocation Center (573); Statesboro, GA
February 1, 2025; 1:00 p.m., ESPN+		Marshall	L 65–71	9–14 (2–9)	Hill Convocation Center (621); Statesboro, GA
February 5, 2025; 7:00 p.m., ESPN+		at Southern Miss	W 49–42	10–14 (3–9)	Reed Green Coliseum (1,202); Hattiesburg, MS
February 8, 2025*; 1:00 p.m., ESPN+		Akron; MAC–SBC Challenge	W 60–36	11–14	Hill Convocation Center (643); Statesboro, GA
February 12, 2025; 6:00 p.m., ESPN+		Coastal Carolina	L 56–67	11–15 (3–10)	Hill Convocation Center (634); Statesboro, GA
February 15, 2025; 1:00 p.m., ESPN+		South Alabama	W 95–68	12–15 (4–10)	Hill Convocation Center (1,023); Statesboro, GA
February 19, 2025; 6:00 p.m., ESPN+		at Coastal Carolina	L 58–64	12–16 (4–11)	HTC Center (1,196); Conway, SC
February 22, 2025; 2:00 p.m., ESPN+		at Old Dominion	L 66–68	12–17 (4–12)	Chartway Arena (2,577); Norfolk, VA
February 26, 2025; 6:00 p.m., ESPN+		Appalachian State	W 57–55	13–17 (5–12)	Hill Convocation Center (522); Statesboro, GA
February 28, 2025; 5:00 p.m., ESPN+		Old Dominion	W 86–79	14–17 (6–12)	Hill Convocation Center (802); Statesboro, GA
Sun Belt tournament
March 4, 2025; 12:30 p.m., ESPN+	(12)	vs. (13) Southern Miss; First Round	W 70–59	15–17	Pensacola Bay Center; Pensacola, FL
March 5, 2025; 12:30 p.m., ESPN+	(12)	vs. (9) Louisiana–Monroe; Second Round	W 75–69	16–17	Pensacola Bay Center (1,079); Pensacola, FL
March 5, 2025; 12:30 p.m., ESPN+	(12)	vs. (8) Georgia State; Third Round	L 64–70	16–18	Pensacola Bay Center (406); Pensacola, FL
*Non-conference game. ^{#}Rankings from AP poll. (#) Tournament seedings in parentheses. All times are in Eastern.

== See also ==
- 2024–25 Georgia Southern Eagles men's basketball team
