= 2024–25 Rice Owls women's basketball team =

American college basketball season

2024–25 Rice Owls women's basketball
- Conference: American Athletic Conference
- Record: 17–17 (7–11 AAC)
- Head coach: Lindsay Edmonds (4th season)
- Assistant coaches: Lakevia Boykin; Nick Grant; Danyelle Grant; Raina Perez; Jalen Latta
- Home arena: Tudor Fieldhouse

2024–25 American Athletic Conference women's basketball standings
	Conf.				Overall
Team	W		L	PCT	W		L	PCT
UTSA	17	–	1	.944	26	–	5	.839
North Texas	15	–	3	.833	25	–	9	.735
South Florida †	13	–	4	.765	23	–	11	.676
Temple	13	–	5	.722	20	–	11	.645
Tulsa	11	–	7	.611	17	–	15	.531
Tulane	9	–	8	.529	17	–	13	.567
East Carolina	8	–	10	.444	17	–	15	.531
UAB	7	–	11	.389	16	–	16	.500
Rice	7	–	11	.389	17	–	17	.500
Memphis	5	–	13	.278	7	–	23	.233
Wichita State	4	–	14	.222	10	–	22	.313
Charlotte	4	–	14	.222	11	–	21	.344
Florida Atlantic	3	–	15	.167	11	–	21	.344
† 2025 AAC tournament winner

The 2024–25 Rice Owls women's basketball team represented Rice University during the 2024–25 NCAA Division I women's basketball season. The Owls, led by fourth-year head coach Lindsay Edmonds, played their home games at Tudor Fieldhouse in Houston, Texas as second-year members of the American Athletic Conference.

== Previous season ==
The Owls finished the 2023–24 season 19–15, 9–9 in AAC play to finish in a five-way tie for sixth place. They defeated UAB, North Texas, Temple, and East Carolina to win the AAC tournament championship game and earn the conference's automatic bid to the NCAA tournament. They received the #14 seed in the Albany Regional 2, where they fell to #3 region seed LSU in the first round.

== Roster ==
2024–25 Rice Owls women's basketball team
Players
Coaches

Pos.	#	Name	Height	Year	Previous school	Hometown
F	1	Malia Fisher	6 ft 2 in (1.88 m)	Sr	Hebron Christian Academy	Dacula, Georgia
G	2	Emily Klaczek	5 ft 8 in (1.73 m)	Sr	UAB	Hoffman Estates, Illinois
G	3	Jill Twiehaus	5 ft 10 in (1.78 m)	Fr	Jenks High School	Tulsa, Oklahoma
G	4	Pace Rickard	5 ft 6 in (1.68 m)	So	Grand Rapids Christian High School	Grand Rapids, Michigan
G	11	Dominique Ennis	5 ft 9 in (1.75 m)	Jr	King's Christian Collegiate	Fort Erie, Ontario
G	12	Layla Conley	5 ft 8 in (1.73 m)	So	John Marshall Harlan High School	San Antonio, Texas
G	14	Maya Bokunewicz	6 ft 0 in (1.83 m)	Sr	State College Area High School	State College, Pennsylvania
G	22	Hailey Adams	6 ft 1 in (1.85 m)	RS So	Tom C. Clark High School	San Antonio, Texas
G/F	23	Kennedy Clifton	6 ft 0 in (1.83 m)	Jr	Bishop Ireton High School	Upper Marlboro, Maryland
G	24	Aniah Alexis	6 ft 1 in (1.85 m)	Fr	Cypress Lakes High School	Waller, Texas
G	30	Jazzy Owens-Barnett	5 ft 7 in (1.7 m)	Jr	Frisco Liberty High School	Plano, Texas
G	32	Trinity Gooden	5 ft 10 in (1.78 m)	Sr	Choctaw High School	Midwest City, Oklahoma
C	35	Sussy Ngulefac	6 ft 4 in (1.93 m)	Sr	Samford	Lilburn, Georgia
C	44	Shelby Hayes	6 ft 2 in (1.88 m)	Jr	Cedar Park High School	Cedar Park, Texas
G	55	Victoria Flores	5 ft 7 in (1.7 m)	So	TCU	West Dallas, Texas

Head coach

- Lindsay Edmonds (Appalachian State)

Assistant coach(es)

- Lakevia Boykin (Wake Forest)
- Nick Grant (Baylor)
- Danyelle Grant (Utah State)
- Raina Perez (NC State)
- Jalen Latta (Western New England)

Legend

- (C) Team captain
- (S) Suspended
- (I) Ineligible
- (W) Walk-on
- Injured
- Current redshirt

Roster
Last update: December 23, 2024

== Schedule and results ==
Date time, TV	Rank^{#}	Opponent^{#}	Result	Record	High points	High rebounds	High assists	Site (attendance) city, state
Exhibition
October 29, 2024*; 7:00 pm		Lubbock Christian	W 69–49	–	17 – Ennis	8 – Tied	6 – Adams	Tudor Fieldhouse; Houston, TX
Non-conference regular season
November 4, 2024*; 7:00 pm, ESPN+		South Dakota State	L 63–65	0–1	16 – Ennis	9 – Adams	4 – Tied	Tudor Fieldhouse (603); Houston, TX
November 7, 2024*; 7:00 pm, ESPN+		North Carolina A&T	W 61–60	1–1	19 – Ngulefac	10 – Ngulefac	5 – Klaczek	Tudor Fieldhouse (641); Houston, TX
November 11, 2024*; 7:00 pm, ESPN+		South Alabama	W 76–58	2–1	12 – Tied	7 – Adams	4 – Hayes	Tudor Fieldhouse (567); Houston, TX
November 14, 2024*; 7:00 pm, ESPN+		Houston; Rivalry	W 60–48	3–1	14 – Ennis	9 – Adams	5 – Owens-Barnett	Tudor Fieldhouse (869); Houston, TX
November 17, 2024*; 2:00 pm, ESPN+		Sam Houston	W 65–60	4–1	15 – Ennis	9 – Adams	4 – Klaczek	Tudor Fieldhouse (733); Houston, TX
November 21, 2024*; 8:00 pm, ESPN+		at Gonzaga	L 69–72	4–2	20 – Adams	9 – Tied	5 – Owens-Barnett	McCarthey Athletic Center (4,876); Spokane, WA
November 28, 2024*; 8:00 pm, FloHoops		vs. BYU; Cancún Challenge Riviera Division	L 51–63	4–3	12 – Ennis	13 – Adams	3 – Tied	Hard Rock Hotel Riviera Maya (174); Cancún, Mexico
November 29, 2024*; 5:30 pm, FloHoops		vs. Vermont; Cancún Challenge Riviera Division	W 79–57	5–3	18 – Flores	9 – Adams	3 – Owens-Barnett	Hard Rock Hotel Riviera Maya (100); Cancún, Mexico
December 4, 2024*; 7:00 pm, ESPN+		Utah Tech	W 82–71	6–3	17 – Fisher	11 – Adams	6 – Flores	Tudor Fieldhouse (566); Houston, TX
December 7, 2024*; 12:00 pm, ESPN+		at Louisiana	L 54–64	6–4	13 – Adams	7 – Adams	3 – Tied	Cajundome (352); Lafayette, LA
December 13, 2024*; 11:15 am, ESPN+		Texas Southern	W 89–62	7–4	19 – Fisher	7 – Fisher	4 – Tied	Tudor Fieldhouse (1,599); Houston, TX
December 18, 2024*; 1:00 pm, ACCNX		at No. 17 Georgia Tech	L 57–88	7–5	12 – Adams	5 – Tied	4 – Fisher	McCamish Pavilion (1,212); Atlanta, GA
AAC regular season
December 29, 2024; 12:00 pm, ESPN2/ESPN+		South Florida	L 64–74	7–6 (0–1)	22 – Flores	8 – Ngulefac	8 – Adams	Tudor Fieldhouse (1,051); Houston, TX
January 1, 2025; 2:00 pm, ESPN+		at Tulane	W 72–64	8–6 (1–1)	21 – Fisher	8 – Fisher	4 – Tied	Devlin Fieldhouse (677); New Orleans, LA
January 8, 2025; 6:30 pm, ESPN+		at UTSA	L 58–67	8–7 (1–2)	16 – Ngulefac	7 – Tied	4 – Flores	Convocation Center (819); San Antonio, TX
January 12, 2025; 2:00 pm, ESPN+		Memphis	W 70–59	9–7 (2–2)	24 – Flores	14 – Hayes	3 – Adams	Tudor Fieldhouse (745); Houston, TX
January 15, 2025; 6:30 pm, ESPN+		at North Texas	L 53–61	9–8 (2–3)	14 – Fisher	11 – Fisher	2 – Tied	The Super Pit (1,858); Denton, TX
January 18, 2025; 2:00 pm, ESPN+		East Carolina	W 65–56	10–8 (3–3)	18 – Flores	8 – Alexis	4 – Flores	Tudor Fieldhouse (833); Houston, TX
January 22, 2025; 6:00 pm, ESPN+		at UAB	L 56–63	10–9 (3–4)	24 – Fisher	11 – Flores	4 – Gooden	Bartow Arena (397); Birmingham, AL
January 25, 2025; 3:00 pm, ESPN+		at Charlotte	W 84–60	11–9 (4–4)	24 – Ennis	8 – Ennis	6 – Gooden	Dale F. Halton Arena (668); Charlotte, NC
January 29, 2025; 7:00 pm, ESPN+		Tulsa	W 64–45	12–9 (5–4)	26 – Flores	10 – Adams	3 – Tied	Tudor Fieldhouse (694); Houston, TX
February 1, 2025; 12:00 pm, ESPN+		at Florida Atlantic	L 61–66	12–10 (5–5)	15 – Ennis	9 – Adams	9 – Fisher	Eleanor R. Baldwin Arena (1,330); Boca Raton, FL
February 5, 2025; 7:00 pm, ESPN+		Tulane	L 67–78	12–11 (5–6)	32 – Fisher	7 – Ngulefac	4 – Gooden	Tudor Fieldhouse (686); Houston, TX
February 12, 2025; 6:00 pm, ESPN+		at South Florida	L 77–82 ^{3OT}	12–12 (5–7)	20 – Alexis	11 – Ngulefac	7 – Flores	Yuengling Center (2,225); Tampa, FL
February 15, 2025; 2:00 pm, ESPN+		at Wichita State	L 57–60	12–13 (5–8)	16 – Ennis	10 – Ennis	4 – Flores	Charles Koch Arena (1,233); Wichita, KS
February 18, 2025; 7:00 pm, ESPN+		Florida Atlantic	W 72–39	13–13 (6–8)	17 – Ennis	11 – Ennis	6 – Tied	Tudor Fieldhouse (501); Houston, TX
February 22, 2025; 4:00 pm, ESPN+		UTSA	L 55–57	13–14 (6–9)	21 – Ennis	12 – Adams	5 – Flores	Tudor Fieldhouse (856); Houston, TX
February 25, 2025; 7:00 pm, ESPN+		UAB	W 73–48	14–14 (7–9)	23 – Flores	11 – Adams	6 – Flores	Tudor Fieldhouse (703); Houston, TX
February 28, 2025; 6:00 pm, ESPN+		at Temple	L 63–83	14–15 (7–10)	15 – Alexis	6 – Flores	6 – Flores	Liacouras Center (1,402); Philadelphia, PA
March 4, 2025; 7:00 pm, ESPN+		North Texas	L 56–68	14–16 (7–11)	12 – Ennis	7 – Hayes	4 – Ennis	Tudor Fieldhouse (794); Houston, TX
AAC tournament
March 9, 2025; 12:00 pm, ESPN+	(9)	vs. (8) UAB; Second round	W 76–63	15–16	18 – Alexis	10 – Ennis	3 – Flores	Dickies Arena; Fort Worth, TX
March 10, 2025; 12:00 pm, ESPN+	(9)	vs. (1) UTSA; Quarterfinals	W 62–58	16–16	16 – Fisher	9 – Alexis	4 – Fisher	Dickies Arena; Fort Worth, TX
March 11, 2025; 2:00 pm, ESPN+	(9)	vs. (4) Temple; Semifinals	W 67–49	17–16	18 – Fisher	9 – Fisher	6 – Flores	Dickies Arena; Fort Worth, TX
March 12, 2025; 6:00 pm, ESPNU	(9)	vs. (3) South Florida; Championship	L 62–69	17–17	19 – Ngulefac	7 – Ngulefac	6 – Flores	Dickies Arena (3,795); Fort Worth, TX
*Non-conference game. ^{#}Rankings from AP Poll. (#) Tournament seedings in parentheses. All times are in Central.
