= 2024–25 Arkansas State Red Wolves women's basketball team =

Intercollegiate basketball season

2024–25 Arkansas State Red Wolves women's basketball

Sun Belt tournament champions

NCAA tournament, first round
- Conference: Sun Belt Conference
- Record: 21–11 (15–3 Sun Belt)
- Head coach: Destinee Rogers (4th season)
- Assistant coaches: Lizzie Nessling; Rudy Evans; Colton Crowder
- Home arena: First National Bank Arena

2024–25 Sun Belt Conference women's basketball standings
	Conf.				Overall
Team	W		L	PCT	W		L	PCT
James Madison	18	–	0	1.000	30	–	6	.833
Arkansas State †	15	–	3	.833	21	–	11	.656
Troy	13	–	5	.722	24	–	14	.632
Coastal Carolina	12	–	6	.667	23	–	9	.719
Old Dominion	9	–	9	.500	18	–	16	.529
Appalachian State	9	–	9	.500	13	–	17	.433
Louisiana	9	–	9	.500	13	–	16	.448
Georgia State	8	–	10	.444	17	–	16	.515
Louisiana–Monroe	7	–	11	.389	11	–	19	.367
Texas State	7	–	11	.389	13	–	17	.433
Marshall	6	–	12	.333	15	–	20	.429
Georgia Southern	6	–	12	.333	16	–	18	.471
Southern Miss	5	–	13	.278	10	–	21	.323
South Alabama	2	–	16	.111	6	–	24	.200
† 2025 Sun Belt tournament winner

The 2024–25 Arkansas State Red Wolves women's basketball team represented Arkansas State University during the 2024–25 NCAA Division I women's basketball season. The Red Wolves, led by fourth-year head coach Destinee Rogers, played their home games at the First National Bank Arena in Jonesboro, Arkansas. They were members of the Sun Belt Conference.

The Red Wolves finished the season 21–11, 15–3 in Sun Belt play, to finish in second place. They received their first NCAA Division I tournament bid by defeating top-seeded James Madison in the Sun Belt tournament championship.

== Preseason ==
On October 14, 2024, the Sun Belt Conference released their preseason coaches poll. Arkansas State was picked to finish thirteenth in the Sun Belt regular season.

=== Preseason rankings ===
Sun Belt preseason poll
Predicted finish	Team	Votes (1st place)
1	James Madison	191 (12)
2	Troy	169 (2)
3	Old Dominion	167
4	Louisiana–Monroe	150
5	Louisiana	122
6	Marshall	118
7	Southern Miss	113
8	Georgia State	107
9	Coastal Carolina	77
10	Texas State	67
11	Appalachian State	61
12	Georgia Southern	53
13	Arkansas State	50
14	South Alabama	25

=== Preseason All-Sun Belt Teams ===
Preseason All-Sun Belt teams
Team	Player	Position	Year
Third	Anna Griffin	Guard	4th

== Roster ==
2024–25 Arkansas State Red Wolves women's basketball team
Players
Coaches

Pos.	#	Name	Height	Year	Previous school	Hometown
G	0	Shaunae Brown	5 ft 5 in (1.65 m)	GS	OSBA; Cal State Bakersfield	Toronto, ON
G	1	Crislyn Rose	5 ft 8 in (1.73 m)	So	Sachse HS	Sachse, TX
G	2	Wynter Rogers	6 ft 0 in (1.83 m)	RS Jr	Little Rock Christian; West Virginia	Little Rock, AR
G	3	Lezhauria Williams	5 ft 8 in (1.73 m)	Sr	Lanphier HS; SIU Edwardsville	Springfield, IL
G	12	Mimi McCollister	5 ft 6 in (1.68 m)	Sr	Athens HS; Old Dominion	Athens, TX
G/F	14	Anna Griffin	6 ft 1 in (1.85 m)	Sr	Aurora Christian HS; Virginia	Aurora, IL
F	15	Quincenia Jackson	6 ft 1 in (1.85 m)	Jr	MacArthur HS; State Fair CC	Decatur, IL
G	21	Zyion Shannon	5 ft 8 in (1.73 m)	Jr	Stewarts Creek HS; Tennessee State	Smyrna, TN
G	23	Bella Weary	5 ft 6 in (1.68 m)	RS Jr	DME Academy; Daytona State	Jacksonville, FL
G	24	Kyanna Morgan	5 ft 10 in (1.78 m)	Sr	Vance HS; Southern	Charlotte, NC
G	25	Kennedie Montue	5 ft 11 in (1.8 m)	Sr	Plum HS; Oakland	Pittsburgh, PA
F	30	Nissa Sam-Grant	6 ft 4 in (1.93 m)	GS	Wheeler HS; UTSA	Toronto, ON

Head coach

- Destinee Rogers (Central Arkansas)

Assistant coach(es)

- Lizzie Nessling (Saint Mary)
- Rudy Evans (Berea)
- Colton Crowder (Arkansas)

Legend

- (C) Team captain
- (S) Suspended
- (I) Ineligible
- (W) Walk-on
- Injured
- Current redshirt

Roster
Last update: November 19, 2024

== Schedule and results ==
Date time, TV	Rank^{#}	Opponent^{#}	Result	Record	High points	High rebounds	High assists	Site city, state
Regular season
November 4, 2024*; 6:00 p.m., ESPN+		at Western Michigan; MAC–SBC Challenge	L 52–61	0–1	15 – Rose	5 – Morgan	3 – Rose	University Arena (658); Kalamazoo, MI
November 8, 2024*; 4:00 p.m., ESPN+		at Arizona State	W 100–96	1–1	33 – Rose	9 – Griffin	4 – 2 tied	Desert Financial Arena (1,149); Tempe, AZ
November 13, 2024*; 7:00 p.m., ESPN+		Mississippi Valley State	W 114–54	2–1	26 – Montue	9 – Montue	8 – Rose	First National Bank Arena (693); Jonesboro, AR
November 19, 2024*; 6:00 p.m.		at Xavier	L 41–45	2–2	9 – McCollister	5 – 2 tied	2 – 3 tied	Cintas Center; Cincinnati, OH
November 24, 2024*; 2:00 p.m., SECN+		at Arkansas	L 60–76	2–3	16 – Griffin	8 – 2 tied	3 – 2 tied	Bud Walton Arena (2,548); Fayetteville, AR
December 3, 2024*; 7:00 p.m., ESPN+		at Little Rock	L 49–59	2–4	18 – Morgan	7 – Morgan	4 – Shannon	Jack Stephens Center (685); Little Rock, AR
December 7, 2024*; 2:00 p.m., ESPN+		Jackson State	W 76–65	3–4	20 – Shannon	10 – Montue	7 – Rose	First National Bank Arena (563); Jonesboro, AR
December 15, 2024*; 1:00 p.m., ESPN+		at UT Martin	L 71–82	3–5	15 – Rogers	7 – Morgan	5 – Shannon	Skyhawk Arena (868); Martin, TN
December 19, 2024*; 7:00 p.m., ESPN+		Tarleton State	L 68–78	3–6	15 – McCollister	12 – Rogers	3 – McCollister	First National Bank Arena (426); Jonesboro, AR
December 22, 2024*; 2:00 p.m., ESPN+		Delta State	W 68–45	4–6	15 – Montue	7 – Rogers	4 – McCollister	First National Bank Arena (520); Jonesboro, AR
December 29, 2024; 1:00 p.m., ESPN+		at Appalachian State	L 62–77	4–7 (0–1)	21 – Montue	8 – Montue	3 – Rose	Holmes Center (604); Boone, NC
January 2, 2025; 7:00 p.m., ESPN+		Marshall	W 66–56	5–7 (1–1)	12 – Brown	9 – Rogers	10 – Rose	First National Bank Arena (421); Jonesboro, AR
January 4, 2025; 2:00 p.m., ESPN+		Georgia Southern	W 76–73	6–7 (2–1)	16 – Morgan	7 – 2 tied	6 – Rose	First National Bank Arena (408); Jonesboro, AR
January 8, 2025; 7:00 p.m., ESPN+		at Texas State	W 66–50	7–7 (3–1)	15 – Montue	6 – Montue	3 – 2 tied	Strahan Arena (511); San Marcos, TX
January 11, 2025; 2:00 p.m., ESPN+		at Louisiana–Monroe	W 75–70	8–7 (4–1)	24 – Shannon	12 – Rogers	8 – Rose	Fant–Ewing Coliseum (928); Monroe, LA
January 15, 2025; 7:00 p.m., ESPN+		Louisiana	W 67–65 ^{OT}	9–7 (5–1)	12 – 2 tied	10 – Rogers	3 – 3 tied	First National Bank Arena (713); Jonesboro, AR
January 18, 2025; 12:00 p.m., ESPN+		Louisiana–Monroe	W 71–43	10–7 (6–1)	17 – Rogers	10 – McCollister	7 – Rose	First National Bank Arena (5,617); Jonesboro, AR
January 23, 2025; 6:00 p.m., ESPN+		at Louisiana	W 62–49	11–7 (7–1)	16 – Montue	11 – Rogers	5 – 2 tied	Cajundome (429); Lafayette, LA
January 25, 2025; 2:00 p.m., ESPN+		at South Alabama	W 82–71	12–7 (8–1)	14 – Shannon	7 – Sam-Grant	4 – Rose	Mitchell Center (452); Mobile, AL
January 30, 2025; 7:00 p.m., ESPN+		Troy	W 91–77	13–7 (9–1)	17 – Shannon	9 – Sam-Grant	11 – Rose	First National Bank Arena (942); Jonesboro, AR
February 1, 2025; 2:00 p.m., ESPN+		South Alabama	W 80–63	14–7 (10–1)	22 – Shannon	12 – Rogers	6 – Rose	First National Bank Arena (1,007); Jonesboro, AR
February 5, 2025; 11:00 a.m., ESPN+		Georgia State	W 86–50	15–7 (11–1)	13 – Shannon	9 – 2 tied	4 – Weary	First National Bank Arena (3,891); Jonesboro, AR
February 8, 2025*; 2:00 p.m., ESPN+		Bowling Green; MAC–SBC Challenge	L 73–75	15–8	29 – Rose	6 – 2 tied	6 – Rogers	First National Bank Arena (815); Jonesboro, AR
February 12, 2025; 5:00 p.m., ESPN+		Southern Miss	W 74–53	16–8 (12–1)	17 – McCollister	8 – 2 tied	4 – 2 tied	First National Bank Arena (5,089); Jonesboro, AR
February 15, 2025; 12:00 p.m., ESPN+		Texas State	W 72–62	17–8 (13–1)	16 – Shannon	12 – Montue	6 – Rose	First National Bank Arena (1,017); Jonesboro, AR
February 20, 2025; 1:00 p.m., ESPN+		at Old Dominion	L 88–95	17–9 (13–2)	23 – Griffin	5 – McCollister	2 – 2 tied	Chartway Arena (1,015); Norfolk, VA
February 22, 2025; 12:00 p.m., ESPN+		at Coastal Carolina	L 70–86	17–10 (13–3)	21 – Shannon	7 – Montue	4 – Rose	HTC Center (686); Conway, SC
February 26, 2025; 5:00 p.m., ESPN+		at Southern Miss	W 56–55	18–10 (14–3)	14 – Montue	8 – Rogers	3 – 2 tied	Reed Green Coliseum (3,241); Hattiesburg, MS
February 28, 2025; 7:00 p.m., ESPN+		at Troy	W 89–85	19–10 (15–3)	16 – Rogers	9 – Rogers	9 – Rose	Trojan Arena (1,607); Troy, AL
Sun Belt tournament
March 9, 2025; 2:00 p.m., ESPN+	(2)	vs. (3) Troy; Semifinals	W 81–66	20–10	21 – Montue	8 – 2 tied	4 – McCollister	Pensacola Bay Center (1,033); Pensacola, FL
March 10, 2025; 1:00 p.m., ESPN2	(2)	vs. (1) James Madison; Finals	W 86–79 ^{OT}	21–10	23 – Rose	8 – Sam-Grant	4 – Shannon	Pensacola Bay Center (847); Pensacola, FL
NCAA tournament
March 22, 2025*; 12:00 p.m., ABC	(15 S4)	(2 S4) No. 3 UConn; First round	L 34–103	21–11	7 – Rose	6 – Morgan	2 – Rose	Harry A. Gampel Pavilion (10,299); Storrs, CT
*Non-conference game. ^{#}Rankings from AP poll. (#) Tournament seedings in parentheses. All times are in Central.

== See also ==
- 2024–25 Arkansas State Red Wolves men's basketball team
