= 2024–25 Louisiana–Monroe Warhawks women's basketball team =

American college basketball season

2024–25 Louisiana–Monroe Warhawks women's basketball
- Conference: Sun Belt Conference
- Record: 11–19 (7–11 Sun Belt)
- Head coach: Missy Bilderback (2nd season)
- Associate head coach: Lauren Pittman
- Assistant coaches: Tatyana Lofton; Nick Long; Devin Cooper
- Home arena: Fant–Ewing Coliseum

2024–25 Sun Belt Conference women's basketball standings
| | Conf. | | | | Overall |
| Team | W | | L | PCT | W | | L | PCT |
|---|---|---|---|---|---|---|---|---|
| James Madison | 18 | – | 0 | 1.000 | 28 | – | 5 | .848 |
| Arkansas State † | 15 | – | 3 | .833 | 21 | – | 11 | .656 |
| Troy | 13 | – | 5 | .722 | 20 | – | 13 | .606 |
| Coastal Carolina | 12 | – | 6 | .667 | 23 | – | 9 | .719 |
| Old Dominion | 9 | – | 9 | .500 | 18 | – | 15 | .545 |
| Appalachian State | 9 | – | 9 | .500 | 13 | – | 17 | .433 |
| Louisiana | 9 | – | 9 | .500 | 13 | – | 16 | .448 |
| Georgia State | 8 | – | 10 | .444 | 17 | – | 16 | .515 |
| Louisiana–Monroe | 7 | – | 11 | .389 | 11 | – | 19 | .367 |
| Texas State | 7 | – | 11 | .389 | 13 | – | 17 | .433 |
| Marshall | 6 | – | 12 | .333 | 15 | – | 20 | .429 |
| Georgia Southern | 6 | – | 12 | .333 | 16 | – | 18 | .471 |
| Southern Miss | 5 | – | 13 | .278 | 10 | – | 21 | .323 |
| South Alabama | 2 | – | 16 | .111 | 6 | – | 24 | .200 |
† 2025 Sun Belt tournament winner As of March 22, 2025

The 2024–25 Louisiana–Monroe Warhawks women's basketball team represented the University of Louisiana at Monroe during the 2024–25 NCAA Division I women's basketball season. The Warhawks, led by second-year head coach Missy Bilderback, played their home games at the Fant–Ewing Coliseum. They were competing as members of the Sun Belt Conference.

== Previous season ==
The Warhawks finished the 2023–24 season 21–14, 10–8 in the Sun Belt play to finish in a tie for fifth place. They were defeated by 4th-seeded Old Dominion in the quarterfinals of the Sun Belt tournament. They were invited to compete in the 2024 WNIT, where they were defeated in the Great 8 round (Quarterfinals) by Troy.

== Preseason ==
On October 14, 2024, the Sun Belt Conference released their preseason coaches poll. Louisiana–Monroe was picked to finish fourth in the Sun Belt regular season.

=== Preseason rankings ===
Sun Belt preseason poll
| Predicted finish | Team | Votes (1st place) |
|---|---|---|
| 1 | James Madison | 191 (12) |
| 2 | Troy | 169 (2) |
| 3 | Old Dominion | 167 |
| 4 | Louisiana–Monroe | 150 |
| 5 | Louisiana | 122 |
| 6 | Marshall | 118 |
| 7 | Southern Miss | 113 |
| 8 | Georgia State | 107 |
| 9 | Coastal Carolina | 77 |
| 10 | Texas State | 67 |
| 11 | Appalachian State | 61 |
| 12 | Georgia Southern | 53 |
| 13 | Arkansas State | 50 |
| 14 | South Alabama | 25 |

=== Preseason All-Sun Belt Teams ===
Preseason All-Sun Belt teams
| Team | Player | Position | Year |
|---|---|---|---|
| First | Jakayla Johnson | Guard | 4th |
| Second | Katlyn Manuel | Forward | 4th |

== Roster ==
2024–25 Louisiana–Monroe Warhawks women's basketball team
Players
Coaches

| Pos. | # | Name | Height | Year | Previous school | Hometown |
|---|---|---|---|---|---|---|
| G | 2 | Nya Valentine | 5 ft 3 in (1.6 m) | Sr | Clemson | Mobile, Alabama |
| G | 3 | Jakayla Johnson | 5 ft 9 in (1.75 m) | Sr | Auburn | Clinton, Mississippi |
| G | 6 | Brikayla Gray | 5 ft 8 in (1.73 m) | RS Sr | Southern Miss | New Hebron, Mississippi |
| G | 10 | Miriam Prince | 5 ft 8 in (1.73 m) | So | East Central Community College | Philadelphia, Mississippi |
| F | 12 | Laila Walker | 6 ft 4 in (1.93 m) | Jr | Jackson State | Gulfport, Mississippi |
| F | 21 | Katlyn Manuel | 6 ft 1 in (1.85 m) | Sr | Northwest High School | Lawtell, Louisiana |
| F | 22 | Sakyia White | 6 ft 1 in (1.85 m) | Sr | Florida State | Tuscaloosa, Alabama |
| G | 23 | Cianté Downs | 5 ft 8 in (1.73 m) | Sr | Mercer | Vaughan, Ontario |
| G | 33 | Meloney Thames | 5 ft 8 in (1.73 m) | RS Jr | Mississippi State | Choctaw, Mississippi |
| F | 35 | AJ Leake | 6 ft 3 in (1.91 m) | Sr | Southern Miss | Cibolo, Texas |
| C | 44 | Sha'Miya Butler | 6 ft 2 in (1.88 m) | Jr | West Monroe High School | West Monroe, Louisiana |

Head coach

- Missy Bilderback (Southern Miss)

Assistant coach(es)

- Lauren Pittman (Southern Miss)
- Tatyana Lofton (Tulane)
- Nick Long (Louisiana–Monroe)
- Devin Cooper (Jones)

Legend

- (C) Team captain
- (S) Suspended
- (I) Ineligible
- (W) Walk-on
- Injured
- Current redshirt

Roster
Last update: March 2, 2025

== Schedule and results ==
| Date time, TV | Rank^{#} | Opponent^{#} | Result | Record | Site (attendance) city, state |
Non-conference regular season
| November 4, 2024*; 5:00 p.m., ESPN+ | | Central Baptist | W 117–60 | 1–0 | Fant–Ewing Coliseum; Monroe, LA |
| November 11, 2024*; 11:30 a.m., ESPN+ | | Louisiana Christian | W 67–48 | 2–0 | Fant–Ewing Coliseum (4,509); Monroe, LA |
| November 13, 2024*; 6:00 p.m., ESPN+ | | at Southern Illinois | W 79–66 | 3–0 | Banterra Center; Carbondale, IL |
| November 17, 2024*; 2:00 p.m., ESPN+ | | No. 22 Alabama | L 52–75 | 3–1 | Fant–Ewing Coliseum (1,721); Monroe, LA |
| November 22, 2024*; 3:00 p.m., ESPN+ | | at Hawaii; Bank of Hawaii Classic | L 64–69 | 3–2 | SimpliFi Arena; Honolulu, HI |
| November 24, 2024*; 4:00 p.m. | | vs. Saint Mary's; Bank of Hawaii Classic | L 61–68 | 3–3 | SimpliFi Arena; Honolulu, HI |
| December 7, 2024*; 2:00 p.m., ESPN+ | | at Lamar | L 60–71 | 3–4 | Montagne Center (599); Beaumont, TX |
| December 11, 2024*; 12:00 p.m., ACCNX | | at No. 25 Georgia Tech | L 37–97 | 3–5 | McCamish Pavilion (1,075); Atlanta, GA |
| December 17, 2024*; 5:00 p.m., ESPN+ | | Mississippi State | L 70–78 | 3–6 | Fant–Ewing Coliseum (1,095); Monroe, LA |
| December 20, 2024*; 12:00 p.m. | | vs. Central Arkansas; Tulane Holiday Tournament | W 65–49 | 4–6 | Devlin Fieldhouse; New Orleans, LA |
| December 21, 2024*; 2:30 p.m., ESPN+ | | at Tulane; Tulane Holiday Tournament | L 63–68 | 4–7 | Devlin Fieldhouse (142); New Orleans, LA |
Sun Belt regular season
| December 29, 2024; 12:00 p.m., ESPN+ | | at Coastal Carolina | L 61–63 | 4–8 (0–1) | HTC Center (735); Conway, SC |
| January 2, 2025; 6:30 p.m., ESPN+ | | Georgia Southern | W 83–67 | 5–8 (1–1) | Fant–Ewing Coliseum (886); Monroe, LA |
| January 4, 2025; 2:00 p.m., ESPN+ | | Old Dominion | L 68–72 | 5–9 (1–2) | Fant–Ewing Coliseum (1,002); Monroe, LA |
| January 9, 2025; 6:30 p.m., ESPN+ | | Southern Miss | W 84–75 | 6–9 (2–2) | Fant–Ewing Coliseum (838); Monroe, LA |
| January 11, 2025; 2:00 p.m., ESPN+ | | Arkansas State | L 70–75 | 6–10 (2–3) | Fant–Ewing Coliseum (928); Monroe, LA |
| January 16, 2025; 6:00 p.m., ESPN+ | | at Southern Miss | W 67–55 | 7–10 (3–3) | Reed Green Coliseum (1,234); Hattiesburg, MS |
| January 18, 2025; 12:00 p.m. | | at Arkansas State | L 43–71 | 7–11 (3–4) | First National Bank Arena; Jonesboro, AR |
| January 25, 2025; 2:00 p.m. | | at Texas State | W 74–66 | 8–11 (4–4) | Strahan Arena (780); San Marcos, TX |
| January 30, 2025; 6:30 p.m., ESPN+ | | South Alabama | W 78–70 | 9–11 (5–4) | Fant–Ewing Coliseum (989); Monroe, LA |
| February 1, 2025; 2:00 p.m., ESPN+ | | Texas State | L 64–67 | 9–12 (5–5) | Fant–Ewing Coliseum (1,021); Monroe, LA |
| February 5, 2025; 6:30 p.m., ESPN+ | | Appalachian State | L 71–73 | 9–13 (5–6) | Fant–Ewing Coliseum (941); Monroe, LA |
| February 8, 2025; 2:00 p.m., ESPN+ | | at South Alabama; Rescheduled from January 22 | L 68–73 | 9–14 (5–7) | Mitchell Center (355); Mobile, AL |
| February 12, 2025; 6:00 p.m., ESPN+ | | at Troy | L 71–84 | 9–15 (5–8) | Trojan Arena (1,870); Troy, AL |
| February 15, 2025; 2:00 p.m. | | at Louisiana | L 60–80 | 9–16 (5–9) | Cajundome (421); Lafayette, LA |
| February 20, 2025; 6:30 p.m., ESPN+ | | Troy | W 84–73 | 10–16 (6–9) | Fant–Ewing Coliseum (1,026); Monroe, LA |
| February 22, 2025; 2:00 p.m., ESPN+ | | Louisiana | W 62–58 | 11–16 (7–9) | Fant–Ewing Coliseum (1,749); Monroe, LA |
| February 26, 2025; 5:00 p.m., ESPN+ | | at Marshall | L 65–73 | 11–17 (7–10) | Cam Henderson Center (1,006); Huntington, WV |
| February 28, 2025; 6:00 p.m., ESPN+ | | at James Madison | L 51–79 | 11–18 (7–11) | Atlantic Union Bank Center (2,799); Harrisonburg, VA |
Sun Belt tournament
| March 5, 2025; 11:30 a.m., ESPN+ | (9) | vs. (12) Georgia Southern; Second Round | L 69–75 | 11–19 | Pensacola Bay Center (1,079); Pensacola, FL |
*Non-conference game. ^{#}Rankings from AP Poll. (#) Tournament seedings in parentheses. All times are in Central.
