= 2024–25 Southern Miss Lady Eagles basketball team =

American college basketball season

2024–25 Southern Miss Lady Eagles basketball
- Conference: Sun Belt Conference
- Record: 10–21 (5–13 Sun Belt)
- Head coach: Joye Lee-McNelis (21st season)
- Assistant coaches: Brooks Donald-Williams; Jessica Barber; Barbara Farris
- Home arena: Reed Green Coliseum

2024–25 Sun Belt Conference women's basketball standings
	Conf.				Overall
Team	W		L	PCT	W		L	PCT
James Madison	18	–	0	1.000	30	–	6	.833
Arkansas State †	15	–	3	.833	21	–	11	.656
Troy	13	–	5	.722	24	–	14	.632
Coastal Carolina	12	–	6	.667	23	–	9	.719
Old Dominion	9	–	9	.500	18	–	16	.529
Appalachian State	9	–	9	.500	13	–	17	.433
Louisiana	9	–	9	.500	13	–	16	.448
Georgia State	8	–	10	.444	17	–	16	.515
Louisiana–Monroe	7	–	11	.389	11	–	19	.367
Texas State	7	–	11	.389	13	–	17	.433
Marshall	6	–	12	.333	15	–	20	.429
Georgia Southern	6	–	12	.333	16	–	18	.471
Southern Miss	5	–	13	.278	10	–	21	.323
South Alabama	2	–	16	.111	6	–	24	.200
† 2025 Sun Belt tournament winner

The 2024–25 Southern Miss Lady Eagles basketball team represented the University of Southern Mississippi during the 2024–25 NCAA Division I women's basketball season. The team was led by 21st-year head coach Joye Lee-McNelis, and played their home games at the Reed Green Coliseum in Hattiesburg, Mississippi as a member of the Sun Belt Conference. The Eagles finished the season 10–21, 5–13 in Sun Belt play, to finish in thirteenth place. They were defeated by Georgia Southern in the first round of the Sun Belt tournament.

On February 21, 2025, Lee-McNelis announced her retirement effective at the end of the season.

== Previous season ==
The Lady Eagles finished the 2023–24 season with an overall record of 20–14 and 10–8 in Sun Belt play to finish in a three-way tie for fifth place. They lost in the Sun Belt tournament to James Madison 77–49. They received an at-large bid into the WNIT, where they fell to Louisiana–Monroe in the Super 16 round.

== Preseason ==
On October 14, 2024, the Sun Belt Conference released their preseason coaches poll. Southern Miss was picked to finish seventh in the Sun Belt regular season.

=== Preseason rankings ===
Sun Belt preseason poll
Predicted finish	Team	Votes (1st place)
1	James Madison	191 (12)
2	Troy	169 (2)
3	Old Dominion	167
4	Louisiana–Monroe	150
5	Louisiana	122
6	Marshall	118
7	Southern Miss	113
8	Georgia State	107
9	Coastal Carolina	77
10	Texas State	67
11	Appalachian State	61
12	Georgia Southern	53
13	Arkansas State	50
14	South Alabama	25

=== Preseason All-Sun Belt teams ===
Preseason All-Sun Belt teams
Team	Player	Position	Year
Second	Melyia Grayson	Center	5th

== Roster ==
2024–25 Southern Miss Lady Eagles women's basketball team
Players
Coaches

Pos.	#	Name	Height	Year	Previous school	Hometown
G	0	Micah Cooper	5 ft 11 in (1.8 m)	Fr	Hebron HS	Carrollton, TX
G	3	Jaccoriah Bracey	5 ft 9 in (1.75 m)	GS	Thomas Edwards HS	Drew, MS
G	5	Bre Sutton	5 ft 9 in (1.75 m)	Sr	Warren Easton HS	New Orleans, LA
F	8	Jaime Gallaty	6 ft 1 in (1.85 m)	Fr	Melbourne Tigers	Maffra, Victoria, Australia
G	10	Samantha Shanks	5 ft 8 in (1.73 m)	Jr	Webbers Falls HS	Webbers Falls, OK
G	11	Trinity Rowe	5 ft 5 in (1.65 m)	Fr	Pikeville HS	Pikeville, KY
G	12	Morgan Sieper	6 ft 0 in (1.83 m)	So	H.B. Plant HS	Tampa, FL
G	14	Nyla Jean	5 ft 6 in (1.68 m)	Sr	H.B. Plant HS	Tampa, FL
F	20	Je'Mya Evans	6 ft 0 in (1.83 m)	Jr	Harrison Central HS	Gulfport, MS
G	23	Ava Shields	5 ft 11 in (1.8 m)	Fr	Sequoyah HS	Hammond, LA
G	24	Mikaylah Manley	5 ft 8 in (1.73 m)	Fr	Albany HS	Lake Charles, LA
C	35	Whitney Hart	6 ft 3 in (1.91 m)	Fr	Liberty Magnet HS	Baton Rouge, LA
C	45	Melyia Grayson	6 ft 3 in (1.91 m)	RS Sr	Hattiesburg HS	Hattiesburg, MS

Head coach

- Joye Lee-McNelis (Southern Miss)

Assistant coach(es)

- Brooks Donald-Williams (Mississippi State)
- Jessica Barber (Mobile)
- Barbara Farris (Tulane)

Legend

- (C) Team captain
- (S) Suspended
- (I) Ineligible
- (W) Walk-on
- Injured
- Current redshirt

Roster
Last update: March 15, 2025

== Schedule and results ==
Date time, TV	Rank^{#}	Opponent^{#}	Result	Record	Site (attendance) city, state
Exhibition
October 30, 2024*; 6:00 p.m.		Mississippi College	W 75–43		Reed Green Coliseum; Hattiesburg, MS
Non-conference regular season
November 4, 2024*; 6:00 p.m., ESPN+		at Bowling Green; MAC–SBC Challenge	L 67–71	0–1	Stroh Center (1,786); Bowling Green, OH
November 7, 2024*; 11:00 a.m., ESPN+		Blue Mountain Christian	W 87–60	1–1	Reed Green Coliseum (3,300); Hattiesburg, MS
November 11, 2024*; 6:00 p.m., ESPN+		William Carey	W 66–47	2–1	Reed Green Coliseum (1,595); Hattiesburg, MS
November 15, 2024*; 6:00 p.m., ESPN+		at Southeastern Louisiana	L 61–68	2–2	Pride Roofing University Center (1,338); Hammond, LA
November 23, 2024*; 12:30 p.m., FloHoops		vs. No. 18 Baylor; Battle 4 Atlantis quarterfinals	L 55–101	2–3	Imperial Arena (990); Paradise Island, Bahamas
November 24, 2024*; 5:30 p.m., FloHoops		vs. Columbia; Battle 4 Atlantis consolation 2nd round	L 66–85	2–4	Imperial Arena (313); Paradise Island, Bahamas
November 25, 2024*; 6:30 p.m., FloHoops		vs. Texas A&M; Battle 4 Atlantis 7th-place game	L 57–79	2–5	Imperial Arena (155); Paradise Island, Bahamas
December 1, 2024*; 11:00 a.m., ESPN+		at UAB	L 66–87	2–6	Bartow Arena (233); Birmingham, AL
December 5, 2024*; 12:00 p.m., ESPN+		Mississippi Valley State	W 77–66	3–6	Reed Green Coliseum; Hattiesburg, MS
December 8, 2024*; 2:00 p.m., ESPN+		Memphis	W 82–69	4–6	Reed Green Coliseum (1,258); Hattiesburg, MS
December 20, 2024*; 12:00 p.m., ESPN+		at Missouri State	L 54–92	4–7	Great Southern Bank Arena (1,731); Springfield, MO
Sun Belt regular season
December 29, 2024; 1:00 p.m., ESPN+		at Georgia State	W 73–59	5–7 (1–0)	GSU Convocation Center (1,384); Atlanta, GA
January 2, 2025; 6:00 p.m., ESPN+		Old Dominion	L 47–65	5–8 (1–1)	Reed Green Coliseum (1,200); Hattiesburg, MS
January 4, 2025; 6:00 p.m., ESPN+		Appalachian State	L 56–76	5–9 (1–2)	Reed Green Coliseum (1,166); Hattiesburg, MS
January 9, 2025; 3:00 p.m., ESPN+		at Louisiana–Monroe	L 75–84	5–10 (1–3)	Fant–Ewing Coliseum (838); Monroe, LA
January 11, 2025; 2:00 p.m., ESPN+		at Louisiana	L 68–77	5–11 (1–4)	Cajundome (569); Lafayette, LA
January 16, 2025; 6:00 p.m., ESPN+		Louisiana–Monroe	L 55–67	5–12 (1–5)	Reed Green Coliseum (1,234); Hattiesburg, MS
January 18, 2025; 2:00 p.m., ESPN+		South Alabama	W 78–49	6–12 (2–5)	Reed Green Coliseum (1,291); Hattiesburg, MS
January 24, 2025; 6:00 p.m., ESPN+		at James Madison	L 47–62	6–13 (2–6)	Atlantic Union Bank Center (2,320); Harrisonburg, VA
January 26, 2025; 12:00 p.m., ESPN+		at Marshall	W 54–48	7–13 (3–6)	Cam Henderson Center (1,132); Huntington, WV
January 30, 2025; 6:00 p.m., ESPN+		Texas State	W 54–48	8–13 (4–6)	Reed Green Coliseum (1,307); Hattiesburg, MS
February 1, 2025; 1:00 p.m., ESPN+		Troy	L 45–70	8–14 (4–7)	Reed Green Coliseum (3,613); Hattiesburg, MS
February 5, 2025; 6:00 p.m., ESPN+		Georgia Southern	L 42–49	8–15 (4–8)	Reed Green Coliseum (1,202); Hattiesburg, MS
February 8, 2025*; 2:00 p.m., ESPN+		Ohio; MAC–SBC Challenge	W 58–46	9–15	Reed Green Coliseum (1,160); Hattiesburg, MS
February 12, 2025; 5:00 p.m., ESPN+		at Arkansas State	L 53–74	9–16 (4–9)	First National Bank Arena (5,089); Jonesboro, AR
February 15, 2025; 3:30 p.m., ESPN+		at Troy	L 59–86	9–17 (4–10)	Trojan Arena (1,857); Troy, AL
February 19, 2025; 7:00 p.m., ESPN+		at South Alabama	L 57–66	9–18 (4–11)	Mitchell Center (504); Mobile, AL
February 22, 2025; 2:00 p.m., ESPN+		at Texas State	L 57–62	9–19 (4–12)	Strahan Arena; San Marcos, TX
February 26, 2025; 5:00 p.m., ESPN+		Arkansas State	L 55–56	9–20 (4–13)	Reed Green Coliseum (3,241); Hattiesburg, MS
February 28, 2025; 5:00 p.m., ESPN+		Louisiana	W 64–53	9–21 (4–14)	Reed Green Coliseum; Hattiesburg, MS
Sun Belt tournament
March 4, 2025; 11:30 a.m., ESPN+	(13)	vs. (12) Georgia Southern; First round	L 59–70	10–21	Pensacola Bay Center; Pensacola, FL
*Non-conference game. ^{#}Rankings from AP poll. (#) Tournament seedings in parentheses. All times are in Central.

== See also ==
- 2024–25 Southern Miss Golden Eagles basketball team
