= 2025 Sun Belt Conference women's basketball tournament =

- Classification: Division I
- Season: 2024–25
- Teams: 14
- Site: Pensacola Bay Center; Pensacola, Florida
- Champions: Arkansas State (1st title)
- Winning coach: Destinee Rogers (1st title)
- MVP: Crislyn Rose (Arkansas State)
- Television: ESPN+, ESPN2

2024–25 Sun Belt Conference women's basketball standings
| | Conf. | | | | Overall |
| Team | W | | L | PCT | W | | L | PCT |
|---|---|---|---|---|---|---|---|---|
| James Madison | 18 | – | 0 | 1.000 | 30 | – | 6 | .833 |
| Arkansas State † | 15 | – | 3 | .833 | 21 | – | 11 | .656 |
| Troy | 13 | – | 5 | .722 | 24 | – | 14 | .632 |
| Coastal Carolina | 12 | – | 6 | .667 | 23 | – | 9 | .719 |
| Old Dominion | 9 | – | 9 | .500 | 18 | – | 16 | .529 |
| Appalachian State | 9 | – | 9 | .500 | 13 | – | 17 | .433 |
| Louisiana | 9 | – | 9 | .500 | 13 | – | 16 | .448 |
| Georgia State | 8 | – | 10 | .444 | 17 | – | 16 | .515 |
| Louisiana–Monroe | 7 | – | 11 | .389 | 11 | – | 19 | .367 |
| Texas State | 7 | – | 11 | .389 | 13 | – | 17 | .433 |
| Marshall | 6 | – | 12 | .333 | 15 | – | 20 | .429 |
| Georgia Southern | 6 | – | 12 | .333 | 16 | – | 18 | .471 |
| Southern Miss | 5 | – | 13 | .278 | 10 | – | 21 | .323 |
| South Alabama | 2 | – | 16 | .111 | 6 | – | 24 | .200 |
† 2025 Sun Belt tournament winner

The 2025 Sun Belt Conference women's basketball tournament was the postseason women's basketball tournament for the Sun Belt Conference during the 2024–25 NCAA Division I women's basketball season. All tournament games were played at Pensacola Bay Center between March 4–10. The winner, Arkansas State, received their first Sun Belt automatic bid to the 2025 NCAA tournament.

== Seeds ==
All 14 conference teams qualified for the tournament. Teams were seeded by record within the conference, with a tiebreaker system implemented to seed teams with identical conference records. The conference adopted a unique stepladder system giving the top two teams byes to the tournament semifinals and the No. 3 and No. 4 teams byes to the tournament quarterfinals. The conference changed the tournament format in an effort to reward teams that played well during the regular season. The top 10 teams received at least one bye.

| Seed | School | Conference | Tiebreaker 1 | Tiebreaker 2 |
|---|---|---|---|---|
| 1 | James Madison | 18–0 | | |
| 2 | Arkansas State | 15–3 | | |
| 3 | Troy | 13–5 | | |
| 4 | Coastal Carolina | 12–6 | | |
| 5 | Old Dominion | 9–9 | 1–1 vs APPST | 1–1 vs GAST |
| 6 | Appalachian State | 9–9 | 1–0 vs ULL | 0–2 vs GAST |
| 7 | Louisiana | 9–9 | 0–1 vs APPST | |
| 8 | Georgia State | 8–10 | | |
| 9 | Louisiana–Monroe | 7–11 | 1–1 vs TXST | 1–1 vs Troy |
| 10 | Texas State | 7–11 | 1–1 vs ULM | 0–2 vs Troy |
| 11 | Marshall | 6–12 | 2–0 vs GASO | |
| 12 | Georgia Southern | 6–12 | 0–2 vs Marshall | |
| 13 | Southern Miss | 5–13 | | |
| 14 | South Alabama | 2–16 | | |

== Schedule ==
| Game | Time | Matchup | Score | Television |
First round – Tuesday, March 4
| 1 | 11:30 am | No. 12 Georgia Southern vs. No. 13 Southern Miss | 70–59 | ESPN+ |
| 2 | 2:00 pm | No. 11 Marshall vs. No. 14 South Alabama | 73–59 | ESPN+ |
Second round – Wednesday, March 5
| 3 | 11:30 am | No. 9 Louisiana–Monroe vs. No. 12 Georgia Southern | 69–75 | ESPN+ |
| 4 | 2:00 pm | No. 10 Texas State vs. No. 11 Marshall | 62–68 | ESPN+ |
Third round – Thursday, March 6
| 5 | 11:30 am | No. 8 Georgia State vs. No. 12 Georgia Southern | 70–64 | ESPN+ |
| 6 | 2:00 pm | No. 7 Louisiana vs. No. 11 Marshall | 46–48 | ESPN+ |
Fourth round – Friday, March 7
| 7 | 11:30 am | No. 5 Old Dominion vs. No. 8 Georgia State | 62–65 | ESPN+ |
| 8 | 2:00 pm | No. 6 Appalachian State vs. No. 11 Marshall | 66–75 | ESPN+ |
Quarterfinals – Saturday, March 8
| 9 | 11:30 am | No. 4 Coastal Carolina vs. No. 8 Georgia State | 77–68 | ESPN+ |
| 10 | 2:00 pm | No. 3 Troy vs. No. 11 Marshall | 85–54 | ESPN+ |
Semifinals – Sunday, March 9
| 11 | 11:30 am | No. 1 James Madison vs. No. 4 Coastal Carolina | 89–65 | ESPN+ |
| 12 | 2:00 pm | No. 2 Arkansas State vs. No. 3 Troy | 81–66 | ESPN+ |
Championship – Monday, March 10
| 13 | 1:00 pm | No. 1 James Madison vs. No. 2 Arkansas State | 79–86^{OT} | ESPN2 |
Game times in CST through the quarterfinals and CDT for the semifinals and championship. Rankings denote tournament seed.

== Bracket ==
First round Tuesday, March 4 ESPN+
12 | Georgia Southern | 70
13 | Southern Miss | 59
11 | Marshall | 73
14 | South Alabama | 59

Second round Wednesday, March 5 ESPN+
9 | Louisiana–Monroe | 69
12 | Georgia Southern | 75
10 | Texas State | 62
11 | Marshall | 68

Third round Thursday, March 6 ESPN+
8 | Georgia State | 70
12 | Georgia Southern | 64
7 | Louisiana | 46
11 | Marshall | 48

Fourth round Friday, March 7 ESPN+
5 | Old Dominion | 62
8 | Georgia State | 65
6 | Appalachian State | 66
11 | Marshall | 75

Quarterfinals; Saturday, March 8 ESPN+
4 | Coastal Carolina | 77
8 | Georgia State | 68
3 | Troy | 85
11 | Marshall | 54

Semifinals; Sunday, March 9 ESPN+
1 | James Madison | 89
4 | Coastal Carolina | 65
2 | Arkansas State | 81
3 | Troy | 66

Championship; Monday, March 10; ESPN2
1 | James Madison | 79
2 | Arkansas State | 86*

== See also ==
- 2025 Sun Belt Conference men's basketball tournament
