= Hill Convocation Center =

Indoor arena in Statesboro, Georgia, U.S.

- The Hill
- Interactive map of Hill Convocation Center
- Full name: Jack and Ruth Ann Hill Convocation Center
- Address: 284 Jack and Ruth Ann Hill Way, Statesboro, GA 30458
- Location: Statesboro, Georgia
- Coordinates: 32°24′22.5″N 81°46′59.0″W
- Owner: Georgia Southern University
- Capacity: 5,500 (basketball); 5,900 (convocation)

Construction
- Groundbreaking: May 26, 2022
- Opened: December 4, 2024
- Cost: $64.4 million
- Architect: Hussey Gay Bell

Tenants
- Georgia Southern Eagles (NCAA) (2024–present)

Website
- Hill Convocation Center

The Jack and Ruth Ann Hill Convocation Center is a multi-purpose 5,500-seat indoor arena in Statesboro, Georgia. The arena is owned by Georgia Southern University and houses the Georgia Southern Eagles (NCAA Division I) men's and women's basketball teams.

== History ==
In February 2021, the University System of Georgia approved plans for the new convocation center to be dedicated to former Georgia State senator and alumnus Jack Hill, along with his wife, Ruth Ann, in recognition for his service to committees that helped expand the university's funding for facilities. In May 2022, construction broke ground on 95,000 square feet (8,800 m^{2}) of land located on the south-side of the university campus along the Veterans Memorial Parkway, serving as the centerpiece of the university's "South Campus" expansion. The structure was built to accommodate basketball games and convocation events, as well as classrooms, faculty offices, and psychology labs to serve the university's sports medicine academia.

The ribbon-cutting ceremony for Hill Convocation Center was held on December 4, 2024. Following its opening, the Georgia Southern men's and women's basketball teams finished their 2024–25 seasons playing at the Hill Convocation Center, despite starting their initial home games at Hanner Fieldhouse.

== See also ==
- List of NCAA Division I basketball arenas
