= 2024–25 Troy Trojans women's basketball team =

Intercollegiate basketball season

2024–25 Troy Trojans women's basketball

Great Alaska Shootout champions

WNIT, Runners-up
- Conference: Sun Belt Conference
- Record: 24–14 (13–5 Sun Belt)
- Head coach: Chanda Rigby (13th season)
- Assistant coaches: Jennifer Graf; Stephanie Murphy; Grace Daniels
- Home arena: Trojan Arena

2024–25 Sun Belt Conference women's basketball standings
	Conf.				Overall
Team	W		L	PCT	W		L	PCT
James Madison	18	–	0	1.000	30	–	6	.833
Arkansas State †	15	–	3	.833	21	–	11	.656
Troy	13	–	5	.722	24	–	14	.632
Coastal Carolina	12	–	6	.667	23	–	9	.719
Old Dominion	9	–	9	.500	18	–	16	.529
Appalachian State	9	–	9	.500	13	–	17	.433
Louisiana	9	–	9	.500	13	–	16	.448
Georgia State	8	–	10	.444	17	–	16	.515
Louisiana–Monroe	7	–	11	.389	11	–	19	.367
Texas State	7	–	11	.389	13	–	17	.433
Marshall	6	–	12	.333	15	–	20	.429
Georgia Southern	6	–	12	.333	16	–	18	.471
Southern Miss	5	–	13	.278	10	–	21	.323
South Alabama	2	–	16	.111	6	–	24	.200
† 2025 Sun Belt tournament winner

The 2024–25 Troy Trojans women's basketball team represented Troy University during the 2024–25 NCAA Division I women's basketball season. The basketball team, led by thirteenth-year head coach Chanda Rigby, played all home games at the Trojan Arena along with the Troy Trojans men's basketball team. They are members of the Sun Belt Conference.

== Offseason ==
=== Departures ===
Name	Number	Pos.	Height	Year	Hometown	Notes
Gabbi Cartagena	0	G	5'8"	Junior	Jackson, Georgia	Transferred to New Orleans
Felmas Koranga	2	F	6'1"	Senior	Nakuru, Kenya	Graduated
Makayia Hallmon	3	G	5'3"	Senior	Coushatta, Louisiana	Graduated
Tai'Sheka Porchia	10	F	6'1"	Senior	Camden, Arkansas	Graduated; signed to play for the KS Basket 25 Bydgoszcz
Ja'Mia Hollings	11	F	6'2"	Senior	West Point, Mississippi	Graduated; signed to play for the ASA Sceaux
Nia Daniel	12	G	5'10"	Senior	Charlotte, North Carolina	Graduated; signed to play for the CS Maristes Coruña
Sharonica Hartsfield	22	G	5'5"	Junior	Oklahoma City, Oklahoma	Transferred to Grambling State
Shaniah Nunn	23	G	6'0"	Sophomore	Birmingham, Alabama	Transferred to Grambling State
Sara Carvajal Caro	24	F	6'3"	Junior	Sevilla, Spain	Transferred to Canisius
Leilani Augmon	32	G	5'11"	Junior	San Jose, California	Transferred to Houston

=== Transfers ===
Name	Number	Pos.	Height	Year	Hometown	Old School
Briana Peguero	1	G	5'7"	Senior	Houston, Texas	Mercer
Ashley Baez	2	G	5'6"	Senior	Santo Domingo, Dominican Republic	Florida Gulf Coast
Emani Jenkins	3	G	5'10"	Junior	Dallas, Texas	Trinity Valley CC
Fortuna Ngnawo	12	F	6'0"	Junior	Bafoussam, Cameroon	Cochise CC
Brianna Jackson	22	F	6'3"	Senior	Virginia Beach, Virginia	Oklahoma State
Adriana Jones	23	G	5'6"	Junior	Newbern, Alabama	Shelton State CC
Khila Morris	24	G	5'11"	Junior	Bronx, New York	Union
Emma Imevbore	34	C	6'4"	Senior	London, England	Arkansas State
Jamirica Roberson	42	F	6'2"	Junior	Montgomery, Alabama	Bishop State CC

=== Recruiting ===
There was no recruiting class of 2024.

== Preseason ==
On October 14, 2024, the Sun Belt Conference released their preseason coaches poll. Troy was picked to finish second in the Sun Belt regular season.

=== Preseason rankings ===
Sun Belt preseason poll
Predicted finish	Team	Votes (1st place)
1	James Madison	191 (12)
2	Troy	169 (2)
3	Old Dominion	167
4	Louisiana–Monroe	150
5	Louisiana	122
6	Marshall	118
7	Southern Miss	113
8	Georgia State	107
9	Coastal Carolina	77
10	Texas State	67
11	Appalachian State	61
12	Georgia Southern	53
13	Arkansas State	50
14	South Alabama	25

=== Preseason All-Sun Belt teams ===
Preseason All-Sun Belt teams
Team	Player	Position	Year
Second	Shaulana Wagner	Guard	4th
Third	Zay Dyer	Forward	3rd

== Roster ==
2024–25 Troy Trojans women's basketball team
Players
Coaches

Pos.	#	Name	Height	Year	Previous school	Hometown
G	1	Briana Peguero	5 ft 7 in (1.7 m)	Sr	Jersey Village HS; Mercer	Houston, Texas
G	2	Ashley Baez	5 ft 6 in (1.68 m)	Sr	Hyde School; Florida Gulf Coast	Santo Domingo, Dominican Republic
G	3	Emani Jenkins	5 ft 10 in (1.78 m)	Jr	South Oak Cliff HS; Trinity Valley CC	Dallas, Texas
F	5	Zay Dyer	6 ft 2 in (1.88 m)	Jr	Maynard Jackson HS; Georgia State	Atlanta, Georgia
F	12	Fortuna Ngnawo	6 ft 0 in (1.83 m)	Jr	G.B.H.S. Bafoussam; Cochise CC	Bafoussam, Cameroon
G	13	Shaulana Wagner	5 ft 10 in (1.78 m)	Sr	Detroit Edison HS	Detroit, Michigan
F	22	Brianna Jackson	6 ft 3 in (1.91 m)	Sr	Princess Anne HS; Oklahoma State	Virginia Beach, Virginia
G	23	Adriana Jones	5 ft 6 in (1.68 m)	Jr	Greensboro HS; Shelton State CC	Newbern, Alabama
G	24	Khila Morris	5 ft 11 in (1.8 m)	Jr	Frederick Douglass Academy; Union	Bronx, New York
C	34	Emma Imevbore	6 ft 4 in (1.93 m)	Sr	King Henry Secondary; Arkansas State	London, England
G	35	Leilani Guion	5 ft 10 in (1.78 m)	Sr	Boone HS; Eastern Florida State	Orlando, Florida
F	42	Jamirica Roberson	6 ft 2 in (1.88 m)	Jr	Johnson Abernathy Graetz HS; Bishop State CC	Montgomery, Alabama

Head coach

- Chanda Rigby (Nova Southeastern)

Assistant coach(es)

- Jennifer Graf (Northwestern State)
- Stephanie Murphy (Mississippi)
- Grace Daniels (Texas–San Antonio)
- Hailey Kuhns (LSU)

Legend

- (C) Team captain
- (S) Suspended
- (I) Ineligible
- (W) Walk-on
- Injured
- Current redshirt

Roster

== Schedule and results ==
Date time, TV	Rank^{#}	Opponent^{#}	Result	Record	High points	High rebounds	High assists	Site city, state
Non-conference regular season
November 4, 2024*; 5:00 p.m., ESPN+		at Buffalo; MAC-SBC Challenge	L 78–80	0–1	15 – Peguero	11 – Ngnawo	4 – Wagner	Alumni Arena (1,055); Buffalo, NY
November 7, 2024*; 8:00 p.m., ESPN+		at Montana State	L 63–73	0–2	15 – Ngnawo	11 – Ngnawo	5 – Wagner	Worthington Arena (1,367); Bozeman, MT
November 10, 2024*; 2:00 p.m., SECN+		at No. 24 Alabama	L 71–94	0–3	14 – Baez	8 – Jackson	5 – Wagner	Coleman Coliseum (2,562); Tuscaloosa, AL
November 14, 2024*; 5:00 p.m., ESPN+		at Chattanooga	W 76–66	1–3	24 – Dyer	12 – Tied	5 – Wagner	McKenzie Arena (1,235); Chattanooga, TN
November 18, 2024*; 7:00 p.m., SECN+		at No. 7 LSU	L 59–98	1–4	12 – Baez	6 – Tied	5 – Wagner	Pete Maravich Assembly Center (9,735); Baton Rouge, LA
November 22, 2024*; 10:30 p.m., YouTube		at Alaska Anchorage; Great Alaska Shootout semifinal	W 80–73 ^{OT}	2–4	20 – Wagner	13 – Ngnawo	3 – Tied	Alaska Airlines Center (1,102); Anchorage, AK
November 23, 2024*; 11:30 p.m., YouTube		vs. North Dakota State; Great Alaska Shootout championship	W 86–69	3–4	13 – Dyer	12 – Dyer	7 – Wagner	Alaska Airlines Center (1,001); Anchorage, AK
December 1, 2024*; 2:00 p.m.		at Mississippi Valley State	L 65–66	3–5	15 – Dyer	11 – Tied	8 – Wagner	Harrison HPER Complex (763); Itta Bena, MS
December 4, 2024*; 12:00 p.m., ESPN+		Oakwood	W 109–47	4–5	14 – Tied	10 – Tied	5 – Tied	Trojan Arena (2,167); Troy, AL
December 14, 2024*; 2:00 p.m., ESPN+		Memphis	W 85–67	5–5	16 – Tied	11 – Dyer	11 – Wagner	Trojan Arena (2,245); Troy, AL
December 18, 2024*; 8:00 p.m.		vs. Toledo; Cherokee Invitational Semifinal	L 62–70	5–6	17 – Wagner	7 – Dyer	4 – Tied	Harrah's Cherokee (678); Cherokee, NC
December 19, 2024*; 6:00 p.m.		vs. Arkansas; Cherokee Invitational	W 77–69	6–6	23 – Dyer	18 – Dyer	9 – Wagner	Harrah's Cherokee (563); Cherokee, NC
Sun Belt regular season
December 29, 2024; 1:00 p.m., ESPN+		at James Madison	L 52–63	6–7 (0–1)	14 – Jackson	21 – Jackson	4 – Wagner	Atlantic Union Bank Center (3,376); Harrisonburg, VA
January 2, 2025; 6:00 p.m., ESPN+		Coastal Carolina	W 92–84 ^{OT}	7–7 (1–1)	25 – Dyer	21 – Dyer	14 – Wagner	Trojan Arena (1,324); Troy, AL
January 4, 2025; 3:33 p.m., ESPN+		Marshall	W 80–69	8–7 (2–1)	17 – Peguero	12 – Dyer	4 – Wagner	Trojan Arena (1,346); Troy, AL
January 9, 2025; 11:00 a.m., ESPN+		at Appalachian State	W 85–68	9–7 (3–1)	22 – Dyer	16 – Dyer	10 – Peguero	Holmes Center (486); Boone, NC
January 11, 2025; 1:00 p.m., ESPN+		at Georgia State	W 80–72	10–7 (4–1)	18 – Tied	17 – Dyer	7 – Peguero	GSU Convocation Center (1,223); Atlanta, GA
January 16, 2025; 6:00 p.m., ESPN+		South Alabama	W 99–60	11–7 (5–1)	19 – Tied	9 – Jenkins	5 – Peguero	Trojan Arena (2,958); Troy, AL
January 18, 2025; 3:33 p.m., ESPN+		Louisiana	W 81–73	12–7 (6–1)	16 – Peguero	12 – Ngnawo	6 – Peguero	Trojan Arena (1,594); Troy, AL
January 23, 2025; 11:00 a.m., ESPN+		at Texas State	W 105–58	13–17 (7–1)	22 – Jenkins	11 – Dyer	5 – Morris	Strahan Arena (2,382); San Marcos, TX
January 25, 2025; 2:00 p.m., ESPN+		at Louisiana	L 53–70	13–8 (7–2)	13 – Jackson	19 – Dyer	3 – Peguero	Cajundome (488); Lafayette, LA
January 30, 2025; 7:00 p.m., ESPN+		at Arkansas State	L 77–91	13–9 (7–3)	16 – Jackson	8 – Tied	7 – Peguero	First National Bank Arena (942); Jonesboro, AR
February 1, 2025; 1:00 p.m., ESPN+		at Southern Miss	W 70–45	14–9 (8–3)	13 – Tied	10 – Dyer	3 – Peguero	Reed Green Coliseum (3,613); Hattiesburg, MS
February 5, 2025; 6:00 p.m., ESPN+		Old Dominion	W 83–80	15–9 (9–3)	19 – Tied	22 – Jackson	5 – Wagner	Trojan Arena (2,232); Troy, AL
February 8, 2025*; 1:00 p.m., ESPN+		Kent State; MAC-SBC Challenge	L 73–84	15–10	25 – Ngnawo	9 – Jackson	5 – Wagner	Trojan Arena (2,412); Troy, AL
February 13, 2025; 6:00 p.m., ESPN+		Louisiana–Monroe	W 84–71	16–10 (10–3)	16 – Tied	11 – Dyer	9 – Wagner	Trojan Arena (1,870); Troy, AL
February 15, 2025; 3:33 p.m., ESPN+		Southern Miss	W 86–59	17–10 (11–3)	17 – Jackson	10 – Ngnawo	9 – Wagner	Trojan Arena (1,857); Troy, AL
February 20, 2025; 6:30 p.m., ESPN+		at Louisiana–Monroe	L 73–84	17–11 (11–4)	16 – Dyer	18 – Dyer	5 – Wagner	Fant–Ewing Coliseum (1,026); Monroe, LA
February 22, 2025; 2:00 p.m., ESPN+		at South Alabama	W 86–71	18–11 (12–4)	23 – Dyer	10 – Dyer	8 – Wagner	Mitchell Center (476); Mobile, AL
February 26, 2025; 7:00 p.m., ESPN+		Texas State	W 86–66	19–11 (13–4)	15 – Jenkins	11 – Ngnawo	5 – Wagner	Trojan Arena (1,477); Troy, AL
February 28, 2025; 7:00 p.m., ESPN+		Arkansas State	L 85–89	19–12 (13–5)	22 – Dyer	9 – Dyer	13 – Wagner	Trojan Arena (1,607); Troy, AL
Sun Belt tournament
March 8, 2025; 2:00 p.m., ESPN+	(3)	vs. (11) Marshall; Quarterfinals	W 85–54	20–12	19 – Ngnawo	12 – Ngnawo	5 – Wagner	Pensacola Bay Center (1,518); Pensacola, FL
March 9, 2025; 2:00 p.m., ESPN+	(3)	vs. (2) Arkansas State; Semifinals	L 66–81	20–13	17 – Peguero	15 – Jackson	6 – Wagner	Pensacola Bay Center (1,033); Pensacola, FL
WNIT
March 24, 2025*; 6:00 p.m., ESPN+		Chattanooga; Second Round	W 85–72	21–13	18 – Dyer	10 – Dyer	8 – Wagner	Trojan Arena (1,853); Troy, AL
March 27, 2025*; 6:00 p.m., ESPN+		North Texas; Super 16	W 88–86 ^{OT}	22–13	23 – Dyer	13 – Dyer	10 – Wagner	Trojan Arena (1,696); Troy, AL
March 31, 2025*; 8:00 p.m., ESPN+		North Dakota State; Great 8	W 97–88 ^{OT}	23–13	22 – Peguero	14 – Jackson	4 – Wagner	Scheels Center (2,462); Fargo, ND
April 2, 2025*; 6:30 p.m., ESPN+		Illinois State; Fab 4	W 99–96	24–13	28 – Peguero	7 – Ngnawo	10 – Wagner	CEFCU Arena (2,406); Normal, IL
April 5, 2025*; 4:00 p.m., CBSSN		Buffalo; Championship	L 84–88	24–14	15 – Dyer	17 – Dyer	7 – Wagner	Alumni Arena (5,650); Amherst, NY
*Non-conference game. ^{#}Rankings from AP Poll. (#) Tournament seedings in parentheses. All times are in Central Time.

== See also ==
- 2024–25 Troy Trojans men's basketball team
