= 2024–25 Old Dominion Monarchs women's basketball team =

Intercollegiate basketball season

2024–25 Old Dominion Monarchs women's basketball

WNIT, Second round
- Conference: Sun Belt Conference
- Record: 18–16 (9–9 Sun Belt)
- Head coach: DeLisha Milton-Jones (5th season)
- Assistant coaches: Danielle Bell; Josh Pace; Roland Jones Jr.
- Home arena: Chartway Arena

2024–25 Sun Belt Conference women's basketball standings
	Conf.				Overall
Team	W		L	PCT	W		L	PCT
James Madison	18	–	0	1.000	30	–	6	.833
Arkansas State †	15	–	3	.833	21	–	11	.656
Troy	13	–	5	.722	24	–	14	.632
Coastal Carolina	12	–	6	.667	23	–	9	.719
Old Dominion	9	–	9	.500	18	–	16	.529
Appalachian State	9	–	9	.500	13	–	17	.433
Louisiana	9	–	9	.500	13	–	16	.448
Georgia State	8	–	10	.444	17	–	16	.515
Louisiana–Monroe	7	–	11	.389	11	–	19	.367
Texas State	7	–	11	.389	13	–	17	.433
Marshall	6	–	12	.333	15	–	20	.429
Georgia Southern	6	–	12	.333	16	–	18	.471
Southern Miss	5	–	13	.278	10	–	21	.323
South Alabama	2	–	16	.111	6	–	24	.200
† 2025 Sun Belt tournament winner

The 2024–25 Old Dominion Monarchs women's basketball team represented Old Dominion University during the 2024–25 NCAA Division I women's basketball season. The Monarchs, led by fifth-year head coach DeLisha Milton-Jones, played their home games at Chartway Arena in Norfolk, Virginia as members of the Sun Belt Conference.

== Previous season ==
In their 2023–24 season, the Monarchs finished fourth ranked in conference play and lost to Marshall in the conference tournament semifinals. Following the conference tournament, they lost to North Carolina A&T in the second round of the 2024 Women's National Invitation Tournament.

== Preseason ==
On October 14, 2024, the Sun Belt Conference released their preseason coaches poll. Old Dominion was picked to finish third in the Sun Belt regular season.

=== Preseason rankings ===
Sun Belt preseason poll
Predicted finish	Team	Votes (1st place)
1	James Madison	191 (12)
2	Troy	169 (2)
3	Old Dominion	167
4	Louisiana–Monroe	150
5	Louisiana	122
6	Marshall	118
7	Southern Miss	113
8	Georgia State	107
9	Coastal Carolina	77
10	Texas State	67
11	Appalachian State	61
12	Georgia Southern	53
13	Arkansas State	50
14	South Alabama	25

=== Preseason All-Sun Belt Teams ===
Preseason All-Sun Belt teams
Team	Player	Position	Year
Second	En'Dya Buford	Guard	5th
Third	Kelsey Thompson	Guard	3rd

== Roster ==
2024–25 Old Dominion Monarchs women's basketball team
Players
Coaches

Pos.	#	Name	Height	Year	Previous school	Hometown
G/F	0	Camryn Hill	6 ft 0 in (1.83 m)	GS	Hampton	Dallas, Texas
G	1	Jadyn Atchison	6 ft 1 in (1.85 m)	So	Colorado	Cedar Hill, Texas
G	2	Simaru Fields	5 ft 6 in (1.68 m)	Jr	Gulf Coast CC	Gulfport, Mississippi
G/F	3	Simone Cunningham	5 ft 10 in (1.78 m)	Sr	Shelton State CC	Pleasant Grove, Alabama
G	4	Sarai Estupiñan	5 ft 5 in (1.65 m)	Sr	UTSA	Cedar Park, Texas
G	5	Nisaa Muhammad	5 ft 10 in (1.78 m)	Fr	DeSoto HS	Dallas, Texas
G	7	Kelsey Thompson	5 ft 10 in (1.78 m)	Jr	South Alabama	Mobile, Alabama
F	14	Marie Kenembeni	6 ft 2 in (1.88 m)	Jr	Angelina College	Yaoundé, Cameroon
F	23	Mariah Clayton	5 ft 10 in (1.78 m)	Fr	Duncanville HS	Mesquite, Texas
C	24	Mikayla Brown	6 ft 1 in (1.85 m)	Jr	Lincoln HS	Dallas, Texas
G	25	En'Dya Buford	5 ft 7 in (1.7 m)	GS	Memphis	Memphis, Tennessee
G	30	Hama'ya Fielder	5 ft 8 in (1.73 m)	Jr	Pearl River CC	Philadelphia, Mississippi
F	35	Sarah H. Fitzgerald	6 ft 3 in (1.91 m)	GS	Campbell	Chesapeake, Virginia
F	55	Brenda Fontana	6 ft 1 in (1.85 m)	Sr	UTEP	Moreno, Argentina

Head coach

- DeLisha Milton-Jones (Florida)

Assistant coach(es)

- Danielle Bell (Georgia)
- Josh Pace (Syracuse)
- Roland Jones Jr. (Central Methodist)

Legend

- (C) Team captain
- (S) Suspended
- (I) Ineligible
- (W) Walk-on
- Injured
- Current redshirt

Roster
Last update: November 1, 2024

== Schedule and results ==
Date time, TV	Rank^{#}	Opponent^{#}	Result	Record	High points	High rebounds	High assists	Site (attendance) city, state
Exhibition
October 27, 2024*; 2:00 p.m.		Christopher Newport	W 97–61	–	13 – Clayton	6 – tied	5 – Buford	Chartway Arena; Norfolk, VA
Regular season
November 4, 2024*; 6:30 p.m., ESPN+		at Ball State; MAC–SBC Challenge	L 46–60	0–1	13 – Clayton	8 – Clayton	4 – Buford	Worthen Arena (1,713); Muncie, IN
November 9, 2024*; 2:00 p.m., ACCNX		at SMU	W 79–70	1–1	19 – Buford	10 – Brown	7 – Buford	Moody Coliseum (1,094); University Park, TX
November 11, 2024*; 6:30 p.m., ESPN+		Morgan State	W 60–48	2–1	12 – Thompson	9 – Brown	2 – tied	Chartway Arena (1,641); Norfolk, VA
November 15, 2024*; 4:00 p.m., ESPN+		Bowie State	W 77–50	3–1	12 – Buford	5 – Brown	3 – Buford	Chartway Arena (1,699); Norfolk, VA
November 21, 2024*; 6:30 p.m., ESPN+		VCU; Rivalry	W 53–51 ^{OT}	4–1	13 – Cunningham	7 – Fields	4 – Buford	Chartway Arena (1,949); Norfolk, VA
November 26, 2024*; 6:30 p.m., ESPN+		William & Mary; Rivalry	W 63–39	5–1	16 – Thompson	7 – Cunningham	6 – Buford	Chartway Arena (2,536); Norfolk, VA
November 28, 2024*; 11:00 a.m., Baller TV		vs. No. 11 Ohio State; Daytona Beach Classic	L 47–70	5–2	11 – tied	5 – tied	3 – Fields	Ocean Center (60); Daytona Beach, FL
November 30, 2024*; 3:30 p.m., Baller TV		vs. Oakland; Daytona Beach Classic	W 64–56	6–2	18 – Cunningham	14 – Cunningham	5 – Buford	Ocean Center (115); Daytona Beach, FL
December 8, 2024*; 2:00 p.m., ACCNX		at NC State	L 55–86	6–3	16 – Buford	7 – Brown	1 – tied	Reynolds Coliseum (5,500); Raleigh, NC
December 15, 2024*; 3:30 p.m., ESPN+		East Carolina; Anne Donovan Classic	L 58–59 ^{OT}	6–4	21 – Buford	14 – Buford	4 – Thompson	Chartway Arena (1,756); Norfolk, VA
December 17, 2024*; 12:00 p.m., ESPN+		at Howard	W 75–58	7–4	16 – Buford	10 – Buford	5 – Fields	Burr Gymnasium (996); Washington, D.C.
December 22, 2024*; 2:00 p.m.		Delaware	Postponed (Note: Game was postponed due to a lack of available players for Delaware.)					Chartway Arena; Norfolk, VA
December 22, 2024*; 2:00 p.m., ESPN+		Virginia State	W 68–58	8–4	15 – Clayton	9 – tied	4 – Thompson	Chartway Arena (1,393); Norfolk, VA
December 29, 2024; 1:00 p.m., ESPN+		South Alabama	W 82–59	9–4 (1–0)	19 – Buford	7 – Buford	3 – tied	Chartway Arena (1,505); Norfolk, VA
January 2, 2025; 7:00 p.m., ESPN+		at Southern Miss	W 65–47	10–4 (2–0)	13 – Cunningham	10 – Cunningham	6 – Buford	Reed Green Coliseum (1,200); Hattiesburg, MS
January 4, 2025; 3:00 p.m., ESPN+		at Louisiana–Monroe	W 72–68	11–4 (3–0)	18 – Buford	8 – tied	6 – Thompson	Fant–Ewing Coliseum (1,002); Monroe, LA
January 8, 2025; 6:30 p.m., ESPN+		Coastal Carolina	L 77–80	11–5 (3–1)	18 – Fields	10 – Cunningham	6 – Buford	Chartway Arena (1,422); Norfolk, VA
January 11, 2025; 2:00 p.m., ESPN+		Marshall	W 80–75	12–5 (4–1)	20 – Thompson	9 – Buford	9 – Buford	Chartway Arena (2,113); Norfolk, VA
January 15, 2025; 6:30 p.m., ESPN+		Appalachian State	W 78–71	13–5 (5–1)	16 – Cunningham	13 – Cunningham	7 – Buford	Chartway Arena (1,513); Norfolk, VA
January 18, 2025; 1:00 p.m., ESPN+		Texas State	L 60–65	13–6 (5–2)	17 – Buford	8 – Buford	6 – Buford	Chartway Arena (1,749); Norfolk, VA
January 23, 2025; 6:30 p.m., ESPN+		at Appalachian State	L 66–74	13–7 (5–3)	20 – tied	9 – tied	2 – tied	Holmes Center (654); Boone, NC
January 25, 2025; 1:00 p.m., ESPN+		at Georgia State	W 64–57	14–7 (6–3)	19 – Fields	13 – Cunningham	5 – Buford	GSU Convocation Center (1,690); Atlanta, GA
January 29, 2025; 6:30 p.m., ESPN+		Georgia State	L 62–66	14–8 (6–4)	21 – Thompson	12 – Cunningham	4 – Buford	Chartway Arena (2,502); Norfolk, VA
February 1, 2025; 2:00 p.m., ESPN+		James Madison; Royal Rivalry	L 62–85	14–9 (6–5)	16 – Fielder	6 – tied	4 – Buford	Chartway Arena (2,987); Norfolk, VA
February 5, 2025; 7:00 p.m., ESPN+		at Troy	L 80–83	14–10 (6–6)	26 – Fields	9 – Cunningham	3 – Buford	Trojan Arena (2,232); Troy, AL
February 8, 2025*; 2:00 p.m., ESPN+		Toledo; MAC–SBC Challenge	L 52–56	14–11	14 – Buford	7 – tied	3 – tied	Chartway Arena (1,646); Norfolk, VA
February 13, 2025; 6:00 p.m., ESPN+		at Marshall	L 70–73 ^{OT}	14–12 (6–7)	13 – tied	11 – Thompson	5 – tied	Cam Henderson Center (1,036); Huntington, WV
February 15, 2025; 2:00 p.m., ESPN+		at James Madison; Royal Rivalry	L 53–66	14–13 (6–8)	15 – Fields	10 – Cunningham	5 – Buford	Atlantic Union Bank Center (4,375); Harrisonburg, VA
February 20, 2025; 2:00 p.m., ESPN+		Arkansas State	W 95–88	15–13 (7–8)	32 – Buford	10 – Cunningham	10 – Buford	Chartway Arena (1,015); Norfolk, VA
February 22, 2025; 2:00 p.m., ESPN+		Georgia Southern	W 68–66	16–13 (8–8)	14 – Thompson	10 – Cunningham	4 – Buford	Chartway Arena (2,577); Norfolk, VA
February 26, 2025; 5:00 p.m., ESPN+		at Coastal Carolina	W 81–65	17–13 (9–8)	21 – tied	12 – Cunningham	7 – Buford	HTC Center (886); Conway, SC
February 28, 2025; 6:00 p.m., ESPN+		at Georgia Southern	L 79–86	17–14 (9–9)	24 – Buford	7 – tied	4 – Buford	Hill Convocation Center (802); Statesboro, GA
Sun Belt tournament
March 7, 2025; 12:30 p.m., ESPN+	(5)	vs. (8) Georgia State; Fourth Round	L 62–65	17–15	17 – Fontana	12 – Cunningham	4 – Buford	Pensacola Bay Center (538); Pensacola, FL
WNIT
March 22, 2025*; 2:00 p.m., ESPN+		Navy; First Round	W 63–42	18–15	18 – Buford	12 – Thompson	3 – Buford	Chartway Arena (871); Norfolk, VA
March 25, 2025*; 7:00 p.m., ESPN+		at Purdue Fort Wayne; Second Round	L 61–87	18–16	15 – Fields	12 – Cunningham	2 – Tied	Gates Sports Center (756); Fort Wayne, IN
*Non-conference game. ^{#}Rankings from AP poll. (#) Tournament seedings in parentheses. All times are in Eastern.

- Source: Old Dominion Athletics

== See also ==
- 2024–25 Old Dominion Monarchs men's basketball team
