= Hyde School =

- U.S. National Register of Historic Places
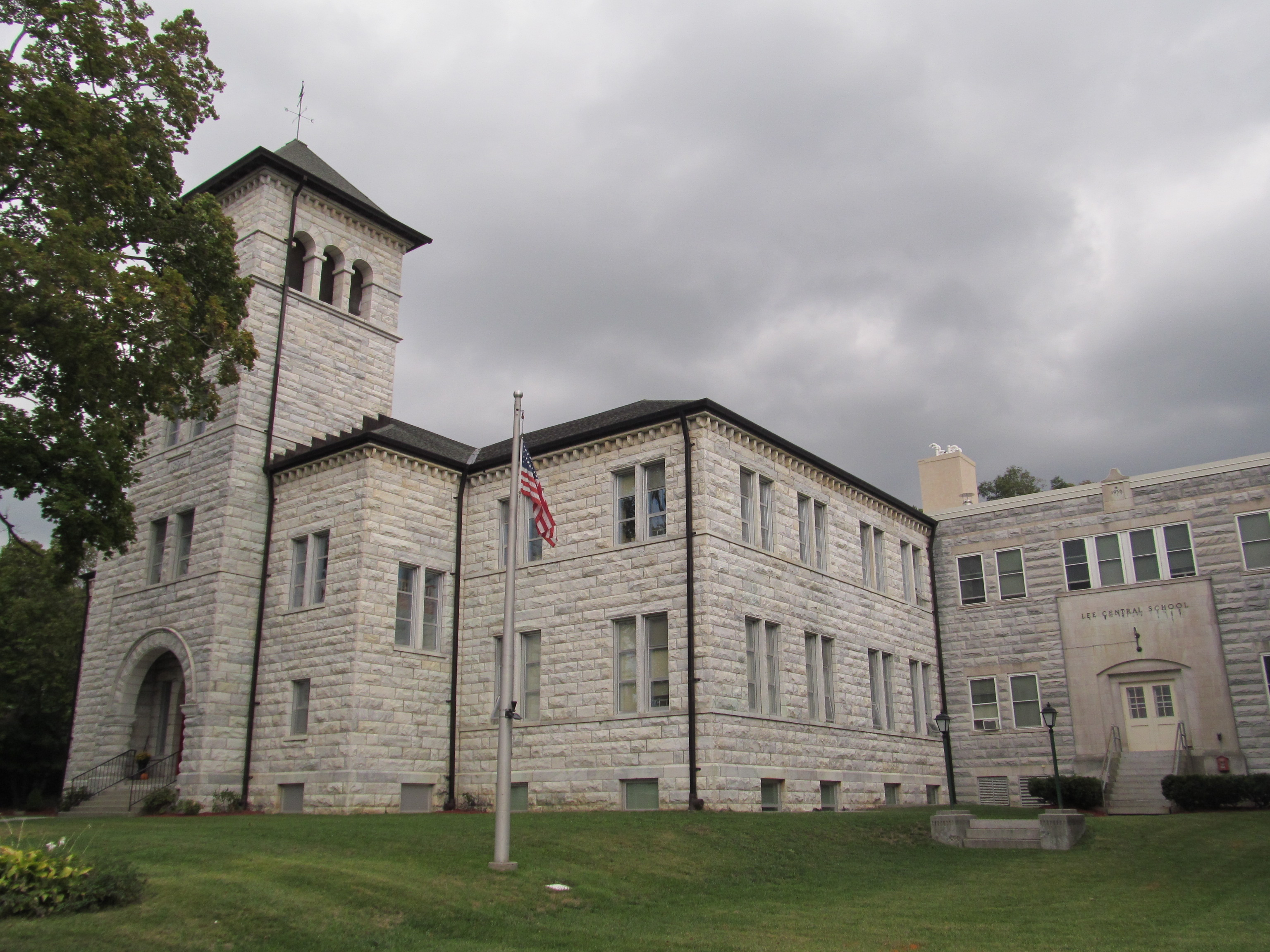
- Also known as Lee Central School

- Location within Massachusetts Location within the United States
- Location: Lee, Massachusetts
- Coordinates: 42°18′28″N 73°14′54″W
- Built: 1894
- Architect: James Bryning; Woodbury and Leighton, et al.
- Architectural style: Romanesque Revival
- NRHP reference No.: 04000566
- Added to NRHP: June 4, 2004

Hyde School is a historic Romanesque Revival school at 130 High Street in Lee, Massachusetts. The school was built in 1894 from locally quarried marble. It is named for Alexander Hyde, who established the town's first school in his house on West Park Street, and was built on the site of the town's first public school.

== History ==
The town of Lee, Massachusetts was incorporated in 1777, and quickly became known as a center of the papermaking industry. Marble quarried in the area achieved a reputation for strength and quality in the 19th century, seeing use in a number of high-profile buildings, including the United States Capitol and the Massachusetts State House. The town's first secondary school was established by Alexander Hyde, son of its first minister, in his house on West Park Street. Townspeople not long thereafter banded together to form the private Lee Academy on a parcel of land above the town center. Lee Academy was gradually transferred to town ownership, and became its public grammar school. It was destroyed by fire in February 1894.

The town had the new Hyde School constructed on the original site of Lee Academy in 1895; it was dedicated to Alexander Hyde. It was designed by James Bryning and constructed of locally quarried marble, a response to several high-profile fires in the town, at a cost of $30,000. It served as the town's high school until 1916, when Rice High School was built. It then served as an elementary school until 2003, when it was taken out of academic service. The building was enlarged by an addition in 1936 that added a library and gymnasium, and again in 1977 when the Rice School was demolished.

The building is now known as Crossway Village, and includes a senior housing complex and senior center. It was listed on the National Register of Historic Places in 2004.

== Description ==
The school sits on an irregular parcel of land on a rise above Main Street in Lee. The original 1895 building is sited at the end of Academy Street, and the 20th-century additions, located to its south and east, do not intrude on the view. The three-story building was built in a cross-shaped plan, with a seven-bay core section, and wings three bays wide. A four-story tower rises above the center of the front facade. The exterior wall and trim work is all of local marble. The original slate roof was replaced in 1994 with asphalt shingles, at which time the building was also equipped with gutters and downspouts. At the time of its National Register nomination, the exterior marble had never required maintenance.

Inside the main building, each floor had six classrooms, and the layout remains fairly intact. The classrooms retained their blackboards and much of the original woodwork. The original floors were covered by vinyl tiling. In the front entry, one of the two stairs was removed to comply with modern fire codes, but the other retains its original woodwork.

In 1936 a two-story addition was added to the southeast corner of the building. This addition, built with a steel frame, housed classrooms on both levels, and a gymnasium/auditorium complex. This construction was faced with Lee marble and trimmed with Indiana limestone in a style sympathetic to that of the main building. A corridor connecting the two sections was added in 1976, when fire code necessitated the removal of some wooden stairs from the main building. A modern 1977 classroom addition further extended the 1936 addition.

== See also ==
- National Register of Historic Places listings in Berkshire County, Massachusetts
