= Merrell Tavern =

- U.S. National Register of Historic Places
- U.S. Historic district – Contributing property
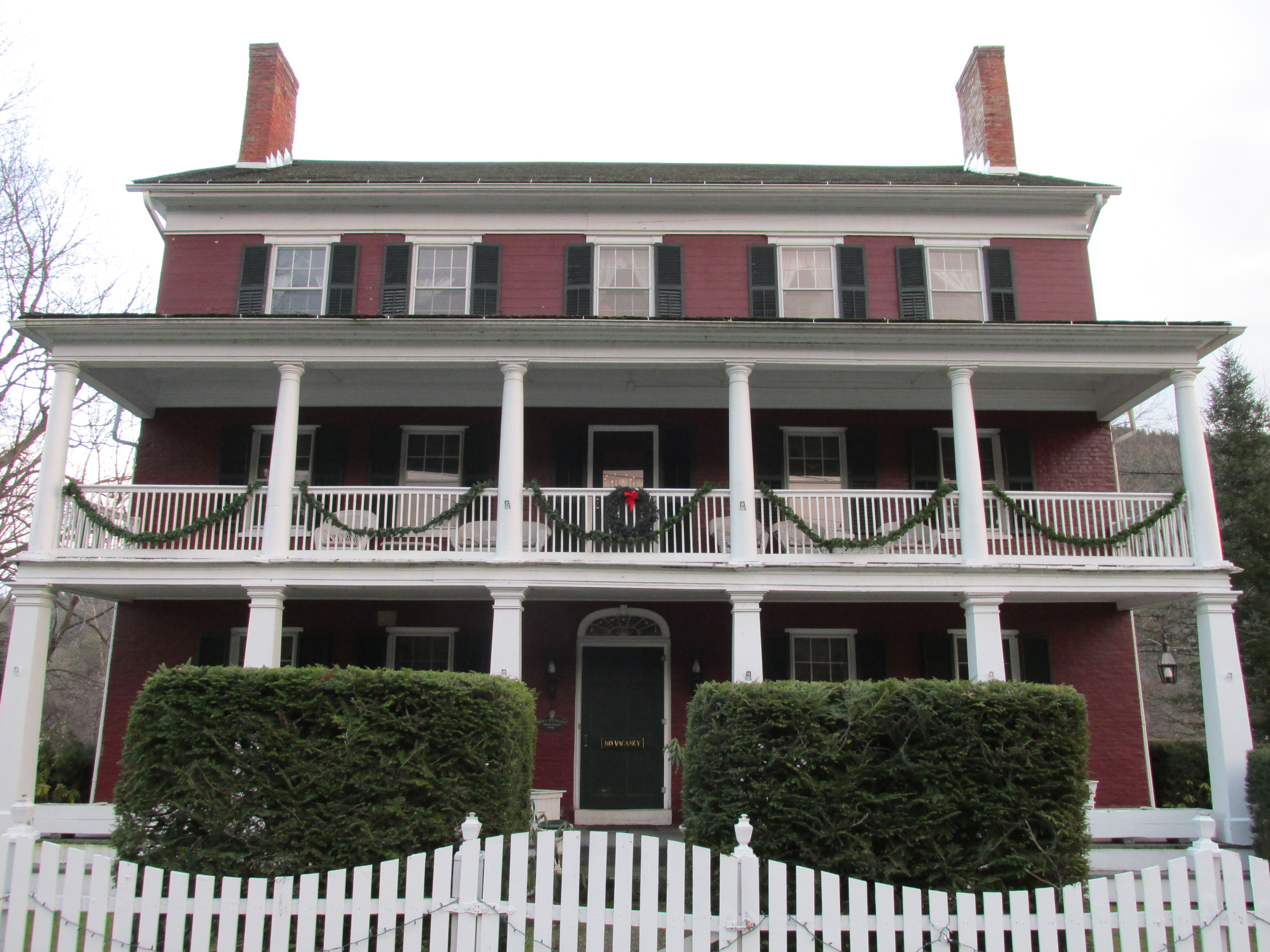
- Merrell Inn

- Location within Massachusetts Location within the United States
- Location: 1565 Pleasant St., South Lee, Massachusetts
- Coordinates: 42°16′36″N 73°16′59″W
- Area: 1 acre (0.40 ha)
- Built: 1794
- Architectural style: Greek Revival, Federal
- Part of: South Lee Historic District (ID99000237)
- NRHP reference No.: 72000136

Significant dates
- Added to NRHP: February 23, 1972
- Designated CP: February 18, 1999

The Merrell Tavern, known more recently as the Merrell Inn, is a historic tavern at 1565 Pleasant Street (Massachusetts Route 102) in South Lee, Massachusetts. Built in 1794 as a residence, it has served for most of two centuries as a local traveler's accommodation, and retains fine Federal period architectural details. It was added to the National Register of Historic Places in 1972. It continues to serve its historic function, and is now operated as a bed and breakfast inn.

== Description and history ==
The Merrell Tavern is located on the south side of Pleasant Street, near the western end of the roughly linear village. It is a 3 1/2-story wood-frame structure, five bays wide, with a gable roof and brick sidewalls. The main facade is covered by a two-story porch extending across its full width. The porch is supported by tapered square columns on the first level, and round Doric columns on the second.

The tavern was built as a residence in 1794 by Joseph Whiton, a local militia commander. It was one of the first brick houses of the Federal period in the region, with some of its design elements taken from the published drawings of Asher Benjamin. It was acquired in 1815 by the Merrell family, who would operate it has a tavern for over a century. The Merrells enlarged the building, adding its third story ballroom and its two-story porch in 1838. The inn's taproom is remarkably well-preserved, with nearly all of its original features intact, including painted oak graining.

The inn was acquired in the 20th century by the Society for the Preservation of New England Antiquities (now Historic New England, or HNE), which operated it as one of its museum properties for a time. It has since been sold into private ownership, with preservation easements held by HNE.

== See also ==
- National Register of Historic Places listings in Berkshire County, Massachusetts
