= Lee, Massachusetts =

- Town
- Lee, Massachusetts, from the south

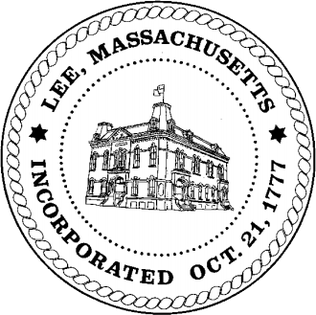
- Seal
- Nickname: Wildcats
- Motto: "Gateway to the Berkshires"
- Location in Berkshire County and Massachusetts.
- Coordinates: 42°18′15″N 73°14′55″W
- Country: United States
- State: Massachusetts
- County: Berkshire
- Settled: 1760; 266 years ago
- Incorporated: October 21, 1777; 248 years ago

Government
  - Type: Open Town Meeting

Area
  - Total: 27.0 sq mi (70.0 km^{2})
  - Land: 26.1 sq mi (67.7 km^{2})
  - Water: 0.89 sq mi (2.3 km^{2})
- Elevation: 1,001 ft (305 m)

Population (2020)
  - Total: 5,788
  - Density: 221/sq mi (85.5/km^{2})
- Time zone: UTC-5 (Eastern)
  - Summer (DST): UTC-4 (Eastern)
- ZIP Codes: 01238 (Lee); 01260 (South Lee)
- Area code: 413
- FIPS code: 25-34655
- GNIS feature ID: 0618268
- Website: www.lee.ma.us

Lee is a town in Berkshire County, Massachusetts, United States. It is part of the Pittsfield, Massachusetts, metropolitan statistical area. The population was 5,788 at the 2020 census. Lee, which includes the villages of South and East Lee and the census-designated place of Lee, is part of the Berkshires resort area.

== History ==
Lee occupies land that was originally territory of Mahican Indians. The first non-native settlement in the area was known as Dodgetown as early as 1760. Dodgetown was named after its founding settler, Asahel Dodge, who immigrated to the area from Cape Cod. Lee was incorporated in 1777 from parts of Great Barrington and Washington. It is named after Revolutionary War General Charles Lee. Lee is a former mill town.

In the autumn of 1786 during Shays' Rebellion, about 250 followers of Daniel Shays encountered state troops commanded by General John Paterson near East Lee. The Shaysites paraded a fake cannon crafted from a yarn beam, and the troops fled.

Early industries included agriculture, lumbering, and lime making. Abundant streams and rivers provided water power for mills that produced textiles and wire. Papermaking became the principal industry in 1806 with the construction of the Willow Mill by Samuel Church in South Lee. The Columbia Mill in central Lee was established in 1827, and eventually became the first to supply 100% groundwood newsprint to The New York Times. By 1857, there were 25 paper mills in Lee. The Smith Paper Company discovered how to manufacture paper solely from wood pulp in 1867, and through the 1870s was the country's largest producer of paper. The mills previously owned by Smith Paper Company were closed in 2008. Today, Lee has only a single papermaking facility.

The town's marble is famous for its quality. The first quarry was established in 1852. In 1867, almost 500,000 cubic feet (14,000 m^{3}) of marble was excavated and shipped on the Housatonic Railroad. Buildings constructed of Lee marble include a wing of the Capitol in Washington, 250 sculptures adorning Philadelphia City Hall, as well as the General Grant National Memorial, and St. Patrick's Cathedral (both in New York City).

The town's 19th-century prosperity is still evident in its architecture, including its town hall, library, several churches and private homes. South Lee includes a historic district listed on the National Register.

Lee has become a popular tourist destination, noted both for its New England charm and its bed and breakfast establishments. It is known as the "Gateway to The Berkshires" because it provides one of only two exits on the Massachusetts Turnpike that serve the county, and the only one going eastbound.

Arlo Guthrie's court appearance before the blind judge and his seeing-eye dog for dumping garbage as described in the song "Alice's Restaurant" took place in the courtroom at the Lee Town Hall.

Lee was a filming location for Before and After (1996) and The Cider House Rules (1999).

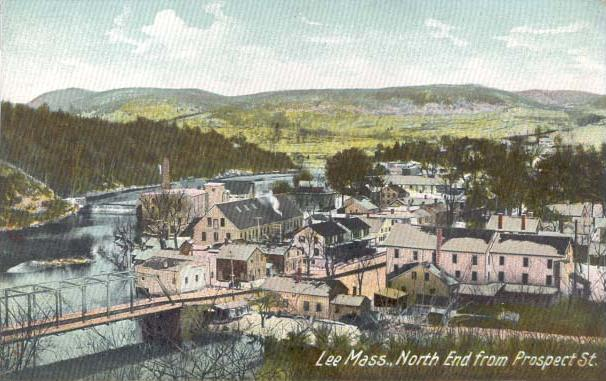
North End c. 1907

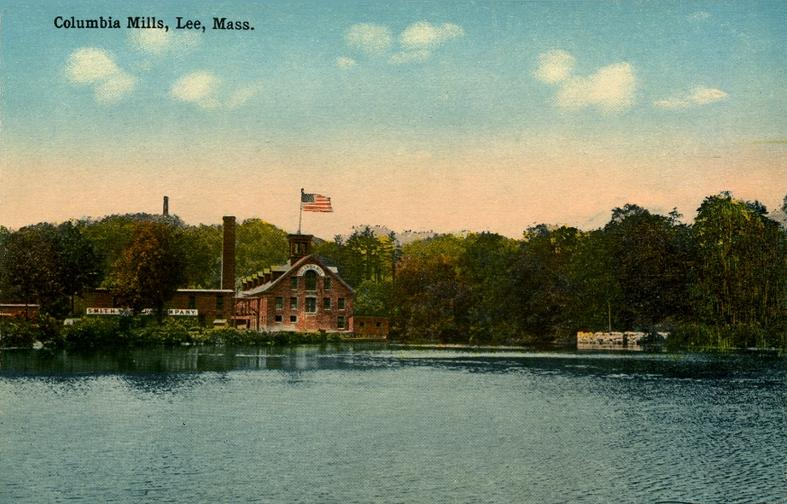
Columbia Mills c. 1912

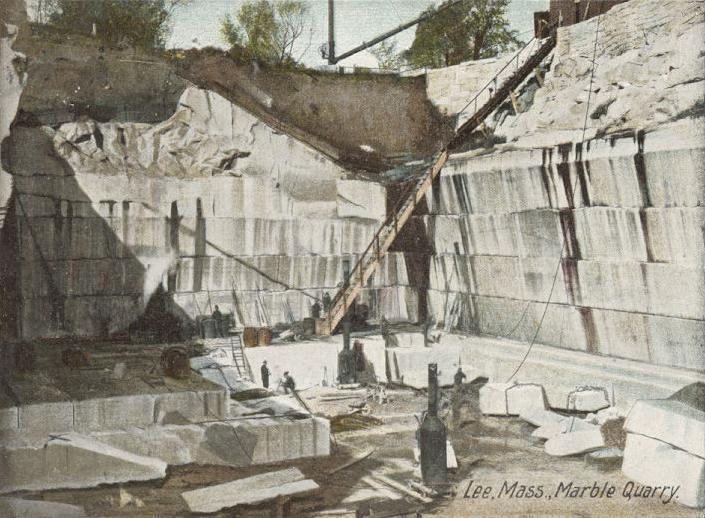
Marble quarry c. 1905

== Geography ==
According to the United States Census Bureau, the town has a total area of 27.0 square miles (70.0 km^{2}), of which 26.1 sq mi (67.7 km^{2}) is land and 0.89 sq mi (2.3 km^{2}), or 3.22%, is water. Lee is bordered by Lenox to the northwest, Washington to the northeast, Becket to the east, Tyringham in the southeast, Great Barrington to the southwest, and Stockbridge to the west. Lee is 10 miles (16 km) south of Pittsfield, 42 miles (68 km) west-northwest of Springfield, and 125 miles (201 km) west of Boston.

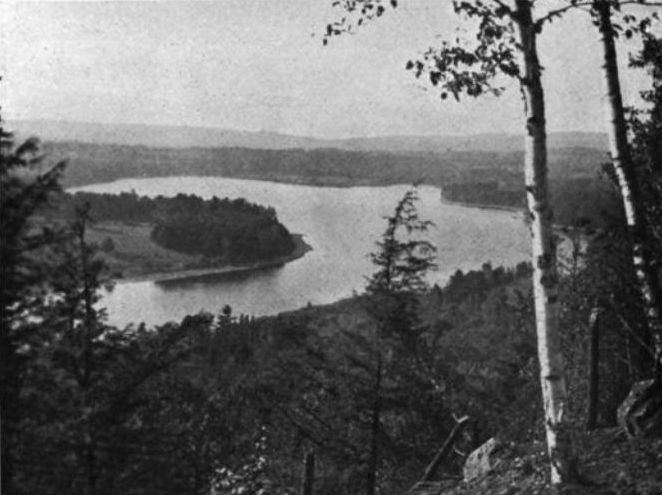
Laurel Lake in 1910

Lee is in the southern section of the Berkshires, in a valley along the Housatonic River. It is west of October Mountain State Forest, with two sections of the forest in Lee. In the southwestern corner of town lies a portion of Beartown State Forest, where Burgoyne Pass crosses the northern end of the mountain. Hop Brook, a marshy brook which flows from Tyringham, flows into the Housatonic in the south; other bodies of water include Laurel Lake to the north and Goose Pond to the southeast. The Appalachian Trail skirts the eastern part of town, passing through Tyringham, Becket and Washington.

Lee is on Interstate 90 (the Massachusetts Turnpike), and is home to Exit 10, the westernmost full exit on the turnpike (Exit 1, in West Stockbridge, is only a turnaround exit) as well as the first service area along the Pike. Lee is also on U.S. Route 20, the "old Mass Pike", which was the main route to New York until the interstate. A small section of U.S. Route 7 crosses through the northwestern corner of town before meeting Route 20 in Lenox. Massachusetts Route 102's eastern terminus is at Route 20, at the Exit 2 toll plaza.

Lee lies along the Housatonic Railroad line, which travels from Pittsfield to Great Barrington and Sheffield, terminating near New Milford, Connecticut, near Danbury. The line is still the area's primary rail link to New York City's metropolitan area, Boston, and Albany. As of 2013, negotiations are underway to restore rail commuter service between the Berkshires and New York City along this route. The town is covered by the Berkshire Regional Transit Authority (BRTA) bus line, which runs between Pittsfield and Great Barrington. Regional bus services make regular daily stops and maintain year-round schedules through Lee. Peter Pan and Bonanza Bus Lines each make scheduled stops at Town Hall.

Regional air service can be reached at Pittsfield Municipal Airport. The nearest national and international air services can be reached at Albany International Airport in Albany, New York, about 55 miles (89 km) away. Bradley International Airport, near Hartford, Connecticut, approximately 70 miles (110 km) from Lee, is also a popular option.

== Climate ==
Lee experiences a humid continental climate with cold winters and warm summers.

Climate data for Lee, Massachusetts (01238)
| Month | Jan | Feb | Mar | Apr | May | Jun | Jul | Aug | Sep | Oct | Nov | Dec | Year |
|---|---|---|---|---|---|---|---|---|---|---|---|---|---|
| Mean daily maximum °F (°C) | 29 (−2) | 32 (0) | 41 (5) | 54 (12) | 65 (18) | 73 (23) | 78 (26) | 76 (24) | 68 (20) | 56 (13) | 45 (7) | 34 (1) | 54 (12) |
| Mean daily minimum °F (°C) | 13 (−11) | 15 (−9) | 22 (−6) | 34 (1) | 45 (7) | 54 (12) | 59 (15) | 57 (14) | 50 (10) | 38 (3) | 30 (−1) | 20 (−7) | 36 (2) |
| Average precipitation inches (mm) | 3.91 (99) | 3.74 (95) | 4.31 (109) | 4.36 (111) | 4.50 (114) | 4.90 (124) | 4.75 (121) | 4.53 (115) | 4.36 (111) | 5.03 (128) | 4.50 (114) | 4.36 (111) | 53.25 (1,352) |
Source: The Weather Channel

== Demographics ==
Historical population
| Year | Pop. | ±% |
|---|---|---|
| 1790 | 1,170 | — |
| 1850 | 3,220 | +175.2% |
| 1860 | 4,420 | +37.3% |
| 1870 | 3,866 | −12.5% |
| 1880 | 3,939 | +1.9% |
| 1890 | 3,785 | −3.9% |
| 1900 | 3,596 | −5.0% |
| 1910 | 4,106 | +14.2% |
| 1920 | 4,085 | −0.5% |
| 1930 | 4,061 | −0.6% |
| 1940 | 4,222 | +4.0% |
| 1950 | 4,820 | +14.2% |
| 1960 | 5,271 | +9.4% |
| 1970 | 6,426 | +21.9% |
| 1980 | 6,247 | −2.8% |
| 1990 | 5,849 | −6.4% |
| 2000 | 5,985 | +2.3% |
| 2010 | 5,943 | −0.7% |
| 2020 | 5,788 | −2.6% |
| 2022* | 5,707 | −1.4% |
* = population estimate. Source: United States census records and Population Estimates Program data.

As of the census of 2000, there were 5,985 people, 2,442 households, and 1,606 families residing in the town. By population, Lee ranks seventh out of the 32 cities and towns in Berkshire County, and 227th out of 351 cities and towns in Massachusetts. The population density was 226.7 inhabitants per square mile (87.5/km^{2}), which ranks sixth in the county and 241st in the Commonwealth. There were 2,927 housing units at an average density of 110.9 per square mile (42.8/km^{2}). The racial makeup of the town was 96.93% White, 0.62% Black or African American, 0.15% Native American, 0.95% Asian, 0.02% Pacific Islander, 0.74% from other races, and 0.60% from two or more races. Hispanic or Latino of any race were 2.49% of the population.

There were 2,492 households, out of which 28.6% had children under the age of 18 living with them, 51.7% were married couples living together, 10.2% had a female householder with no husband present, and 34.2% were non-families. 28.2% of all households were made up of individuals, and 12.6% had someone living alone who was 65 years of age or older. The average household size was 2.39, and the average family size was 2.91.

In the town, the population was spread out, with 22.1% under the age of 18, 7.0% from 18 to 24, 28.5% from 25 to 44, 25.6% from 45 to 64, and 16.8% who were 65 years of age or older. The median age was 40 years. For every 100 females, there were 94.0 males. For every 100 females age 18 and over, there were 92.1 males.

The median income for a household in the town was $41,556, and the median income for a family was $49,630. Males had a median income of $35,565 versus $26,232 for females. The per capita income for the town was $19,799. About 2.5% of families and 6.7% of the population were below the poverty line, including 3.4% of those under age 18 and 4.2% of those age 65 or over.

== Government ==
While Lee was the least populous municipality in Massachusetts not to use the open town meeting form of government; and instead, it used the representative town meeting, led by a board of selectmen and a town administrator. It recently switched to open town meeting, and did away with the outdated representatives. Lee has its own police, fire and public works departments, and in 2027 will have constructed a new public safety building. Lee has a post office as well. The town's library is a member of the regional library networks.

On the state level, Lee is represented in the Massachusetts House of Representatives by the Fourth Berkshire district, which covers southern Berkshire County, as well as the westernmost towns in Hampden County. In the Massachusetts Senate, the town is represented by the Berkshire, Hampshire, and Franklin district, which includes all of Berkshire County and western Hampshire and Franklin counties. The town is home to the First Station of Barracks "B" of the Massachusetts State Police.

On the national level, Lee is part of Massachusetts's 1st congressional district, represented by Richard Neal of Springfield, Massachusetts. Massachusetts is represented in the United States Senate by senior Senator Elizabeth Warren and junior Senator Ed Markey.

== Education ==
Lee operates its own school department, which also serves the town of Tyringham, and has an option to serve Otis and Sandisfield. Lee Elementary School serves students from pre-kindergarten through sixth grades, and the Lee Middle and High School serves students from seventh through twelfth grades. Lee's athletics teams are nicknamed the Wildcats, and their colors are black and orange. Additionally, Lee is home to Saint Mary's School, a parochial school which serves students through eighth grade. Other private schools can be found in Great Barrington and other surrounding towns.

The nearest community college is the South County Center of Berkshire Community College in Great Barrington, and the nearest state university is Massachusetts College of Liberal Arts. The nearest private college is Williams College.

== Sites of interest ==
- Festival Latino of the Berkshires
- Golden Hill Bridge
- Hyde House
- Hyde School
- Lee historic railroad station
- Lower Main Street Historic District
- Museum of Animation, Special Effects & Art
- October Mountain State Forest
- South Lee Historic District
- Unique Specialty Shops of Main Street

== Goose Pond and Laurel Lake ==
Goose Pond and Laurel Lake are two significant bodies of water located in Lee, Massachusetts. Both are popular recreational areas, offering opportunities for boating, fishing, and swimming.

=== Goose Pond ===
Goose Pond is a 263-acre enlarged Great Pond. It is a glacially formed body of water that is long and narrow, stretching over two miles in length but only a quarter-mile at its widest point. The pond is known for its clear, clean water and is home to various species of fish. The pond's ability to carry trout from year to year has led to its designation as special brown trout water.

The pond is divided into two parts: the lower, larger pond, surrounded by summer homes, and the upper pond, which maintains a more wilderness-like atmosphere. The upper pond lies in the 112-acre Goose Pond Reservation, where it intersects the Appalachian Trail and an Appalachian Mountain Club shelter for hikers is situated on its shore. Goose Pond Reservation is managed by the Massachusetts Trustees of Reservations. The town of Tyringham maintains a boat ramp close by, which serves as the only public access point.

In recent years, Goose Pond has been the site of several notable incidents. In July 2021, a woman drove her car into the pond after taking a wrong turn while following her GPS. The woman escaped unharmed, and the car was later towed from the water. In another incident, a fugitive from Maine was found hiding in the hikers' shelter near Goose Pond after fleeing from a car accident on Route 90. The man was apprehended without incident after a multi-agency search.

=== Laurel Lake ===
Laurel Lake is a 170-acre body of water that straddles the border between Lee and Lenox. The lake is a popular destination for boating, fishing, and swimming. It is stocked annually with trout by the Massachusetts Division of Fisheries and Wildlife.

Laurel Lake has been facing challenges with invasive species, particularly Eurasian watermilfoil and zebra mussels. Efforts to manage and control these invasive species have been ongoing. The Laurel Lake Association, in partnership with the Town of Lee, has been actively involved in the prevention and management of these invasive species. These efforts include the use of benthic barriers to smother the milfoil and prevent its growth, as well as public education, boat inspections, and boat washing, to prevent the spread of zebra mussels.

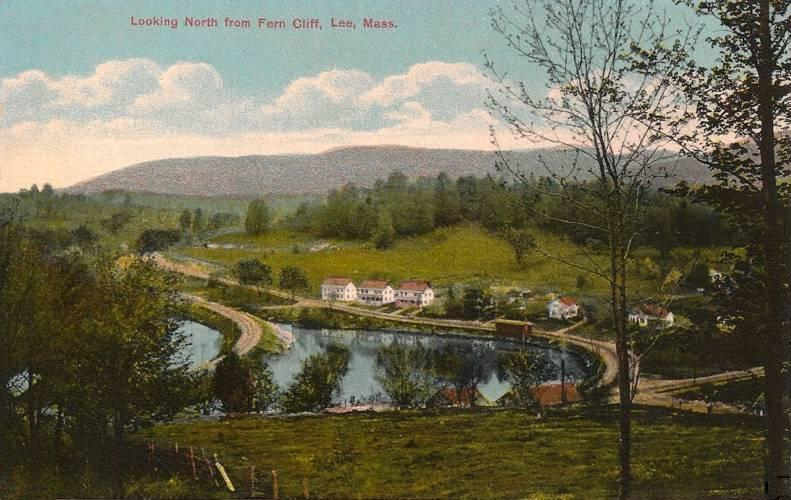
Housatonic Railroad track in 1911

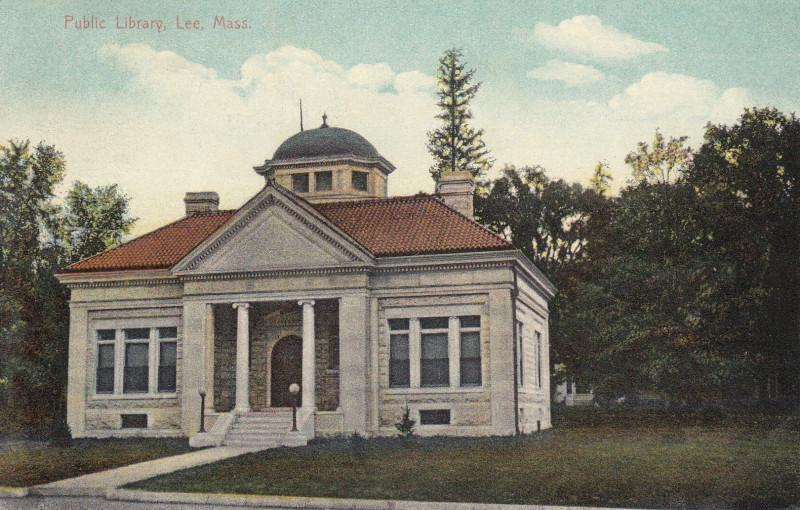
Lee Library in 1909, the only remaining Carnegie library building in the Berkshires

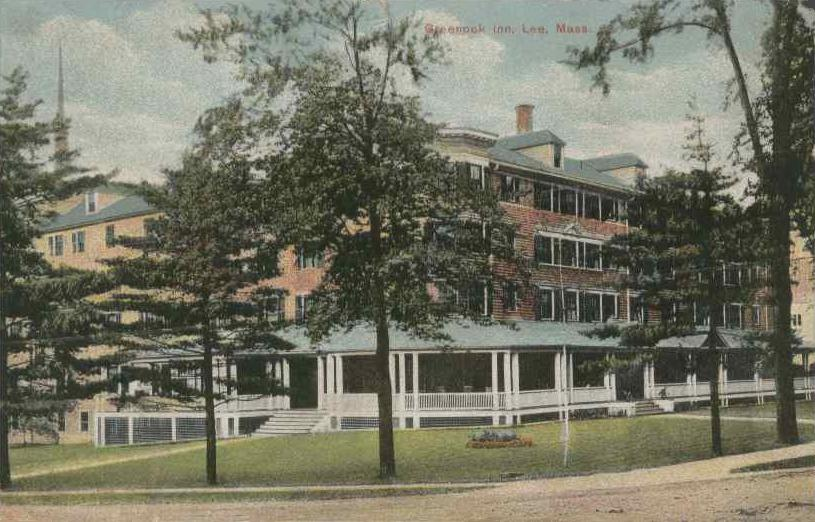
Greenock Inn in 1912

== Notable people ==
- John M. Barlow, politician and businessman
- Nathan B. Bradley, congressman
- Henry Billings Brown, Associate Justice of the U.S. Supreme Court
- Michelle Cuevas, author
- Thomas C. Durant, financier and railroad promoter
- Frank Dwyer, baseball pitcher
- Elisha Foote, judge, inventor, and mathematician
- Henri Gosselin, politician
- Addison H. Laflin, congressman
- Wayne Larrivee, sportscaster
- Debra Jo Rupp, actress
- Augusta Read Thomas, composer
- Elizur Smith, senator and paper manufacturer
- Elizur Yale Smith, socialite, historian
- Wellington Smith, largest American paper manufacturer
- Edward V. Whiton, Chief Justice of the Wisconsin Supreme Court
- Josiah Yale, captain and pioneer of Lee
