= Lower Main Street Historic District (Lee, Massachusetts) =

Historic district in Massachusetts, United States

- Lee Lower Main Street Historic District
- U.S. National Register of Historic Places
- U.S. Historic district
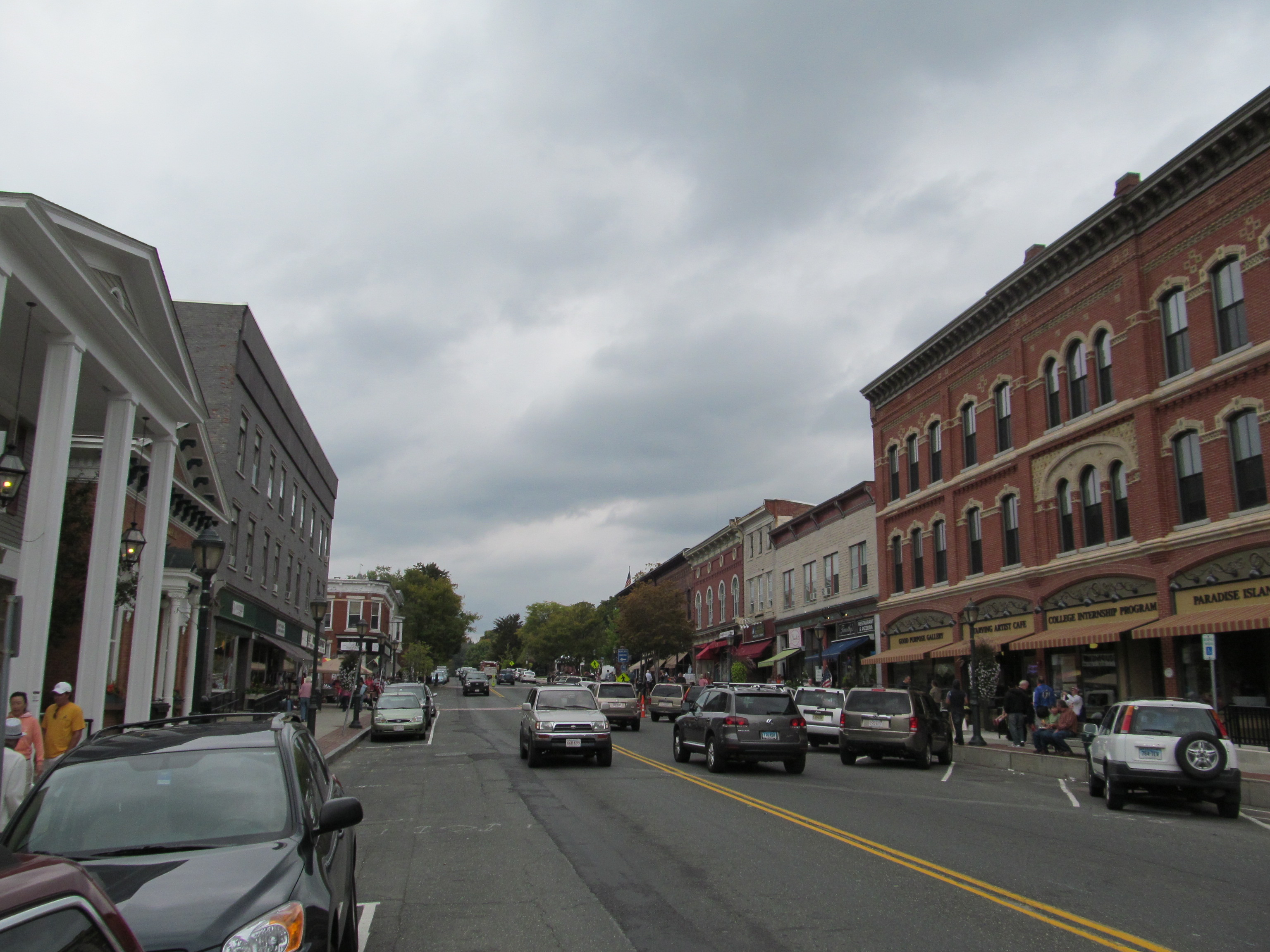
- Main Street view

- Location within Massachusetts Location within the United States
- Location: Roughly, area surrounding Main and Park Streets, Lee, Massachusetts
- Coordinates: 42.30489°N 73.24903°W
- Area: 15 acres (6.1 ha)
- Architectural style: Romanesque, Late 19th And 20th Century Revivals, late Victorian
- NRHP reference No.: 09000090
- Added to NRHP: March 26, 1976

The Lower Main Street Historic District of Lee, Massachusetts encompasses the historic center of the town. It is centered on the junction of Main and Park Streets, where the center of the town was laid out when it was established in 1760. Although a meeting house was erected on this site, that structure was torn down, and the space was converted into a town common, a function it continues to serve today. The district also includes a portion of the business district, running along Main Street. The district was listed on the National Register of Historic Places in 1976.

== Description and history ==
The town of Lee was settled in 1760 and incorporated in 1777. Its economy in the early 19th century grew on the basis of paper manufacturing, which was augmented in the 1850s by the addition of marble quarrying; the town's marble was used in high-profile projects including the United States Capitol and the Washington Monument. Most of its paper mills were destroyed by flooding in 1886. In the 20th century, the town's economy transitioned to be largely based on tourism. The town center, centered on the junction of Main and Park Streets, is reflective of its 19th-century period of economic prosperity.

The historic district's visual focus is the oval town park at the northeast corner of Park and Main Streets. It is the site of the town's first church, built in 1780, and is now overlooked by the Romanesque First Congregational Church, built in 1858. Also facing the park is the 1874 Memorial Hall, which houses town offices and court facilities and serves as its memorial to the town's Civil War dead. Extending north from the park are a series of mainly masonry commercial buildings, most of which were built between 1850 and 1900, often by businessmen associated either with the marble or papermaking business. Native Lee marble is also seen in several of the district's buildings, including the public library.

== See also ==
- National Register of Historic Places listings in Berkshire County, Massachusetts
