= South Lee Historic District =

Historic district in Massachusetts, United States

- U.S. National Register of Historic Places
- U.S. Historic district
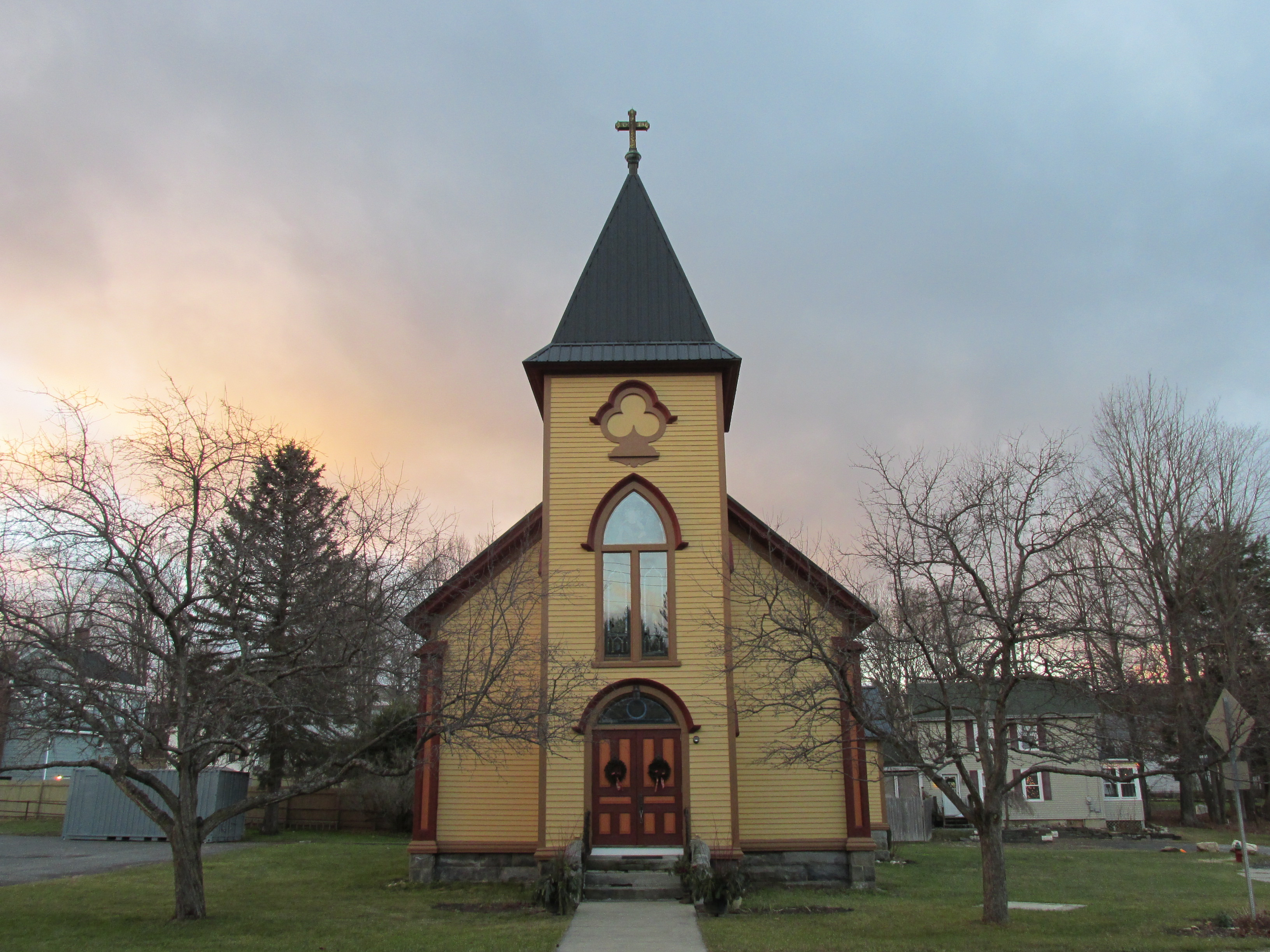
- Saint Francis Gallery

- Location within Massachusetts Location within the United States
- Location: 1365-1710 Pleasant St., 1120-1140 Fairview St., 15-80 Willow Street, Lee, Massachusetts
- Coordinates: 42°16′41″N 73°16′36″W
- Area: 93 acres (38 ha)
- Architect: Emerson, W.R.; et al.
- Architectural style: Mid 19th Century Revival, Early Republic
- NRHP reference No.: 99000237
- Added to NRHP: February 18, 1999

The South Lee Historic District encompasses the historic portion of the village of South Lee in Lee, Massachusetts. Extending mainly along Massachusetts Route 102 (Pleasant Street) between Fairview Street and the Stockbridge town line, the village is a well-preserved 19th-century mill village, with fine Federal and Greek Revival buildings and a later 19th-century paper mill. It was listed on the National Register of Historic Places in 1999.

== Description and history ==
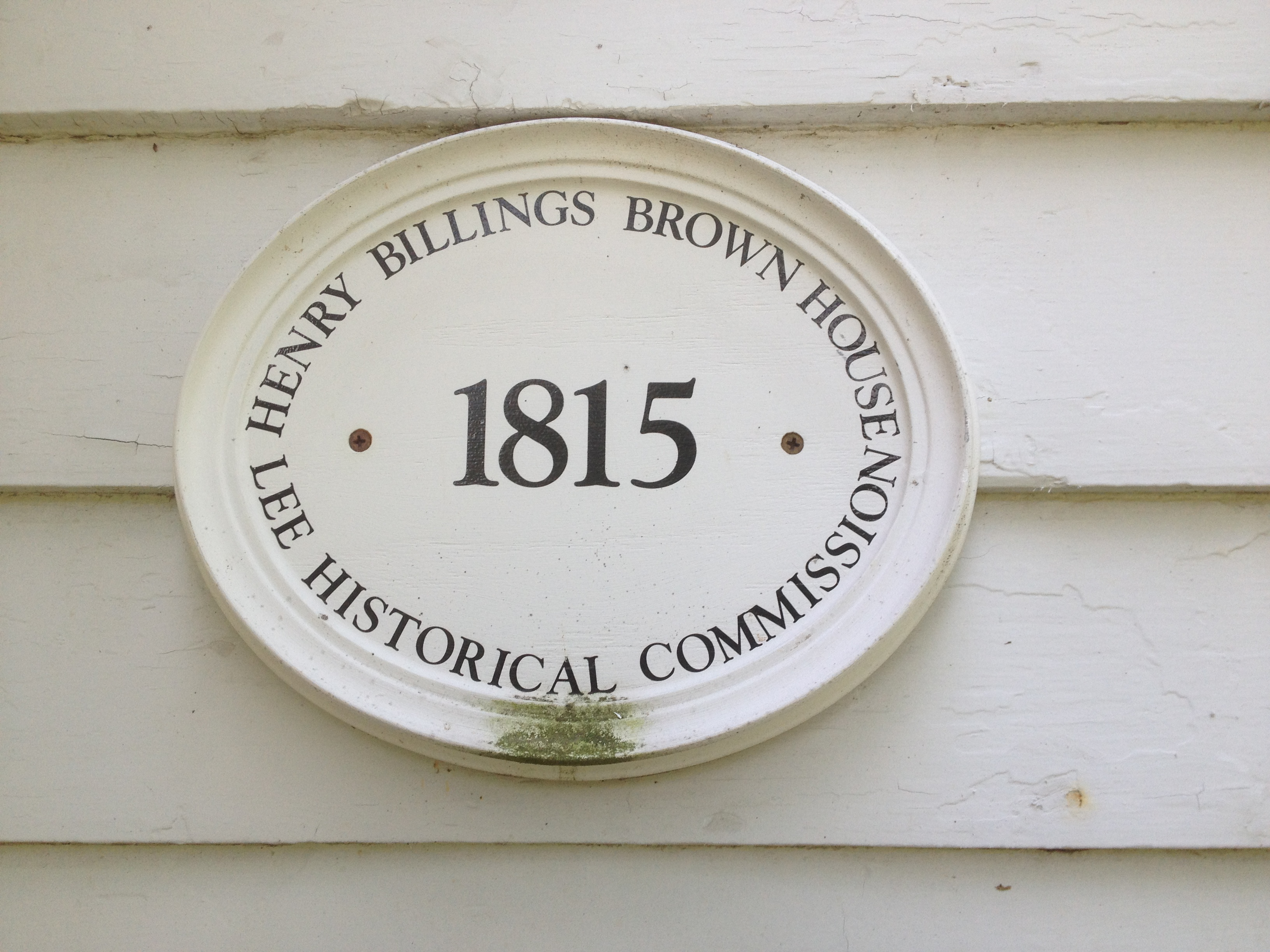
Henry Billings Brown House

The town of Lee was settled in 1760, comparatively later than neighboring towns, and was incorporated in 1777. South Lee was a remote outpost off major roads until the Housatonic River Turnpike was built in 1806 by Col. Joseph Whiton, who had in 1794 built the house now known as the Merrell Tavern. Whiton was a major early economic force in the village, operating a sawmill, forge, and brickyard. Now on a major east–west route, and close to what became a major north–south route (now United States Route 7), the village soon grew as a traveler's stop and civic center. Industry also developed, with one of the first paper mills in the Berkshires opened on the banks of the Housatonic River in 1806, joined later by other industries. The railroad's arrival in 1848 spurred further development, including the construction of a large paper mill by the Hurlbuts in 1872.

The historic district extends along Pleasant Street from the Stockbridge town line in the west to Fairview Street in the east, and for a short distance along the latter roadway. This area is hemmed in by the Housatonic River and Bear Mountain in the south, and a relatively steep ridge in the north. Most of the architecture is wood-frame residential, although three early Federal period buildings are of brick, including the Merrell Tavern, the village's oldest surviving building. The most common styles found in the village are Federal and Greek Revival, reflecting the village's period of growth in the first half of the 19th century. Archaeological resources in the district include remnants of some of its 19th century industrial complexes.

== See also ==
- National Register of Historic Places listings in Berkshire County, Massachusetts
