= 2024–25 Marshall Thundering Herd women's basketball team =

American college basketball season

2024–25 Marshall Thundering Herd women's basketball
- Conference: Sun Belt Conference
- Record: 15–20 (6–12 Sun Belt)
- Head coach: Juli Fulks (1st season)
- Assistant coaches: Stephanie Gehlhausen; Sacha Santimano; Mykasa Robinson
- Home arena: Cam Henderson Center

2024–25 Sun Belt Conference women's basketball standings
| | Conf. | | | | Overall |
| Team | W | | L | PCT | W | | L | PCT |
|---|---|---|---|---|---|---|---|---|
| James Madison | 18 | – | 0 | 1.000 | 30 | – | 6 | .833 |
| Arkansas State † | 15 | – | 3 | .833 | 21 | – | 11 | .656 |
| Troy | 13 | – | 5 | .722 | 24 | – | 14 | .632 |
| Coastal Carolina | 12 | – | 6 | .667 | 23 | – | 9 | .719 |
| Old Dominion | 9 | – | 9 | .500 | 18 | – | 16 | .529 |
| Appalachian State | 9 | – | 9 | .500 | 13 | – | 17 | .433 |
| Louisiana | 9 | – | 9 | .500 | 13 | – | 16 | .448 |
| Georgia State | 8 | – | 10 | .444 | 17 | – | 16 | .515 |
| Louisiana–Monroe | 7 | – | 11 | .389 | 11 | – | 19 | .367 |
| Texas State | 7 | – | 11 | .389 | 13 | – | 17 | .433 |
| Marshall | 6 | – | 12 | .333 | 15 | – | 20 | .429 |
| Georgia Southern | 6 | – | 12 | .333 | 16 | – | 18 | .471 |
| Southern Miss | 5 | – | 13 | .278 | 10 | – | 21 | .323 |
| South Alabama | 2 | – | 16 | .111 | 6 | – | 24 | .200 |
† 2025 Sun Belt tournament winner

The 2024–25 Marshall Thundering Herd women's basketball team represented Marshall University during the 2024–25 NCAA Division I women's basketball season. The Thundering Herd, led by first-year head coach Juli Fulks, played their home games at Cam Henderson Center as members of the Sun Belt Conference. They finished the season 15–20, 6–12 in Sun Belt play to finish in tie for eleventh place. In the Sun Belt tournament, they defeated South Alabama, Texas State, Louisiana, and Appalachian State before losing to Troy in the quarterfinals.

== Previous season ==
The Thundering Herd finished the season 26–7, 17–1 in Sun Belt play to finish in first place. In the Sun Belt tournament, they defeated Appalachian State, Old Dominion, and James Madison to become champions. They received the Sun Belt's automatic bid to the NCAA tournament where, as a No. 13 seed, they lost to No. 4 seed Virginia Tech in the first round.

After the season, head coach Kim Caldwell left to become the head coach at Tennessee. Marshall hired Transylvania University head coach, Juli Fulks, as her replacement.

== Offseason ==
=== Departures ===
| Name | Number | Pos. | Height | Year | Hometown | Notes |
|---|---|---|---|---|---|---|
| Abby Beeman | 5 | G | 5'4" | GS Senior | Ridgeley, West Virginia | Graduated |
| Breanna Campbell | 1 | G | 5'5" | Senior | Largo, Florida | Graduated |
| Terah Harness | 21 | G | 5'9" | Junior | New Carlisle, Ohio | Transferred to Buffalo |
| Tamia Lawhorne | 87 | F | 6'0" | GS Senior | Amityville, New York | Graduated |
| Mahogany Matthews | 25 | F | 6'1" | RS Senior | York, Pennsylvania | Graduate transferred to Georgia State |
| Sydni Scott | 15 | G | 5'8" | Sophomore | Prospect Park, Pennsylvania | Transferred to Fairfield |

=== Incoming transfers ===
| Name | Number | Pos. | Height | Year | Hometown | Previous School |
|---|---|---|---|---|---|---|
| Maddie Kellione | 6 | G | 5'6" | GS Senior | Cynthiana, Kentucky | Tennessee Tech |
| Blessing King | 2 | G | 5'10" | Junior | Columbus, Ohio | Morehead State |
| Leyocha Marigney | 13 | F | 6'3" | Sophomore | Fresno, California | Reedley |
| Adiana Pachecho | 4 | F | 6'1" | Junior | Harrison, New Jersey | CCBC Essex |
| TreShonda Williams | 1 | F | 6'2" | Junior | Flint, Michigan | Columbia State |

=== 2024 recruiting class ===
College recruiting information
| Name | Hometown | School | Height | Weight | Commit date |
|---|---|---|---|---|---|
| Kassie Ingram; PG | Cincinnati, Ohio | Kings High School | 5 ft 11 in (1.80 m) | N/A | May 1, 2024 |
| Kassie Ingram; PG | Recruit ratings: (NR) | | | | |
Overall recruit ranking: Rivals: NR ESPN: NR
Note: In many cases, Scout, Rivals, 247Sports, On3, and ESPN may conflict in their listings of height and weight.; In these cases, the average was taken. ESPN grades are on a 100-point scale.; Sources: "2024 Team Ranking". Rivals.

== Preseason ==
On October 14, 2024, the Sun Belt Conference released their preseason coaches poll. Marshall was picked to finish sixth in the Sun Belt regular season.

=== Preseason rankings ===
Sun Belt preseason poll
| Predicted finish | Team | Votes (1st place) |
|---|---|---|
| 1 | James Madison | 191 (12) |
| 2 | Troy | 169 (2) |
| 3 | Old Dominion | 167 |
| 4 | Louisiana–Monroe | 150 |
| 5 | Louisiana | 122 |
| 6 | Marshall | 118 |
| 7 | Southern Miss | 113 |
| 8 | Georgia State | 107 |
| 9 | Coastal Carolina | 77 |
| 10 | Texas State | 67 |
| 11 | Appalachian State | 61 |
| 12 | Georgia Southern | 53 |
| 13 | Arkansas State | 50 |
| 14 | South Alabama | 25 |

=== Preseason All-Sun Belt Teams ===
Preseason All-Sun Belt teams
| Team | Player | Position | Year |
|---|---|---|---|
| First | Aislynn Hayes | Guard | 4th |

== Roster ==
2024–25 Marshall Thundering Herd women's basketball team
Players
Coaches

| Pos. | # | Name | Height | Year | Previous school | Hometown |
|---|---|---|---|---|---|---|
| G/F | 0 | Timberlynn Yeast | 5 ft 9 in (1.75 m) | RS Fr | Mercer County | Harrodsburg, Kentucky |
| F | 1 | TreShondra Williams | 6 ft 2 in (1.88 m) | Jr | Columbia State | Flint, Michigan |
| G | 2 | Blessing King | 5 ft 10 in (1.78 m) | Jr | Morehead State | Columbus, Ohio |
| G | 3 | CC Mays | 5 ft 8 in (1.73 m) | Jr | Seffner Christian | Tampa, Florida |
| F | 4 | Adiana Pachecho | 6 ft 1 in (1.85 m) | Jr | CCBC Essex | Harrison, New Jersey |
| G | 5 | Alasia Hayes | 5 ft 8 in (1.73 m) | RS Jr | Mississippi State | Murfreesboro, Tennessee |
| G | 6 | Maddie Kellione | 5 ft 6 in (1.68 m) | GS | Tennessee Tech | Cynthiana, Kentucky |
| G | 10 | Aislynn Hayes | 5 ft 8 in (1.73 m) | Sr | Mississippi State | Murfreesboro, Tennessee |
| G/F | 11 | Jayda Allie | 5 ft 8 in (1.73 m) | RS Fr | Cabell Midland | Huntington, West Virginia |
| F | 13 | Leyocha Marigney | 6 ft 3 in (1.91 m) | So | Reedley | Fresno, California |
| F | 14 | Olivia Ziolkowski | 6 ft 0 in (1.83 m) | Jr | Woodrow Wilson | Beckley, West Virginia |
| G | 20 | Peyton Ilderton | 5 ft 6 in (1.68 m) | Jr | Logan | Logan, West Virginia |
| G | 22 | Ashley Tudor | 5 ft 11 in (1.8 m) | Sr | Radford | Cincinnati, Ohio |
| F | 23 | Meredith Maier | 6 ft 0 in (1.83 m) | Jr | Fairmont Senior | Fairmont, West Virginia |
| G | 24 | Kassie Ingram | 5 ft 11 in (1.8 m) | Fr | Kings | Cincinnati, Ohio |
| G/F | 30 | Aarionna Redman | 5 ft 10 in (1.78 m) | Sr | Pickerington Central | Pickerington, Ohio |

Head coach

- Juli Fulks (Capital)

Assistant coach(es)

- Stephanie Gehlhausen (Southern Indiana)
- Sacha Santimano (Dakota State)
- Mykasa Robinson (Louisville)

Legend

- (C) Team captain
- (S) Suspended
- (I) Ineligible
- (W) Walk-on
- Injured
- Current redshirt

Roster
Last update: 7/27/2024

== Schedule and results ==
| Date time, TV | Rank^{#} | Opponent^{#} | Result | Record | High points | High rebounds | High assists | Site (attendance) city, state |
Exhibition
| October 27, 2024*; 6:30 pm | | Pikeville | W 87–77 | – | 21 – Ai. Hayes | 13 – Maier | 4 – Kellione | Cam Henderson Center; Huntington, WV |
Regular season
| November 4, 2024*; 7:00 pm, ESPN+ | | at Toledo; MAC-SBC Challenge | L 68–71 | 0–1 | 20 – Mays | 9 – Mays | 4 – Kellione | Savage Arena (3,754); Toledo, OH |
| November 10, 2024*; 1:00 pm, ESPN+ | | Northern Kentucky | L 78–80 | 0–2 | 25 – Maier | 8 – King | 6 – Kellione | Cam Henderson Center (1,245); Huntington, WV |
| November 13, 2024*; 6:00 pm, ESPN+ | | Elon | W 65–56 | 1–2 | 27 – Ai. Hayes | 8 – Maier | 4 – Kellione | Cam Henderson Center (966); Huntington, WV |
| November 17, 2024*; 6:00 pm, ESPN+ | | George Mason | L 56–69 | 1–3 | 16 – Ai. Hayes | 6 – King | 4 – Ai. Hayes | Cam Henderson Center (1,037); Huntington, WV |
| November 21, 2024*; 7:30 pm, Peacock | | vs. Penn State; WBCA Showcase | L 59–74 | 1–4 | 12 – Mays | 7 – Ai. Hayes | 5 – Ai. Hayes | State Farm Field House (657); Bay Lake, FL |
| November 23, 2024*; 12:00 pm, Peacock | | vs. Tulsa; WBCA Showcase | W 84–80 ^{OT} | 2–4 | 31 – Ai. Hayes | 9 – Ai. Hayes | 3 – Tied | State Farm Field House (735); Bay Lake, FL |
| December 1, 2024*; 1:00 pm, ESPN+ | | Salem | W 98–41 | 3–4 | 15 – Maier | 15 – King | 7 – Tied | Cam Henderson Center (986); Huntington, WV |
| December 8, 2024*; 2:00 pm, SECN+ | | at Florida | L 63–82 | 3–5 | 20 – Kellione | 6 – King | 4 – Hayes | O'Connell Center (1,732); Gainesville, FL |
| December 13, 2024*; 11:00 am, ESPN+ | | Jacksonville | W 78–76 | 4–5 | 20 – Maier | 9 – King | 5 – Kellione | Cam Henderson Center (3,733); Huntington, WV |
| December 18, 2024*; 6:30 pm, ESPN+ | | at Cincinnati | L 64–67 | 4–6 | 24 – Ai. Hayes | 7 – Maier | 5 – Kellione | Fifth Third Arena (1,210); Cincinnati, OH |
| December 21, 2024*; 1:00 pm, ESPN+ | | Davis & Elkins | W 77–38 | 5–6 | 13 – Maier | 8 – Tied | 4 – Tied | Cam Henderson Center (1,080); Huntington, WV |
| December 29, 2024; 1:00 pm, ESPN+ | | Texas State | L 49–60 | 5–7 (0–1) | 17 – Ai. Hayes | 9 – Maier | 3 – Kellione | Cam Henderson Center (1,117); Huntington, WV |
| January 2, 2025; 8:00 pm, ESPN+ | | at Arkansas State | L 56–66 | 5–8 (0–2) | 18 – Mays | 6 – Maier | 4 – Ai. Hayes | First National Bank Arena (421); Jonesboro, AR |
| January 4, 2025; 4:30 p.m., ESPN+ | | at Troy | L 69–80 | 5–9 (0–3) | 18 – Hayes | 7 – Maier | 5 – Ai. Hayes | Trojan Arena (1,346); Troy, AL |
| January 9, 2025; 7:00 pm, ESPN+ | | at James Madison | L 59–71 | 5–10 (0–4) | 19 – Mays | 5 – 3 Tied | 2 – Tied | Atlantic Union Bank Center (2,235); Harrisonburg, VA |
| January 11, 2025; 2:00 pm, ESPN+ | | at Old Dominion | L 75–80 | 5–11 (0–5) | 21 – Ai. Hayes | 9 – King | 5 – Tied | Chartway Arena (2,113); Norfolk, VA |
| January 15, 2025; 6:00 pm, ESPN+ | | James Madison | L 65–93 | 5–12 (0–6) | 24 – Mays | 7 – Marigney | 4 – Tied | Cam Henderson Center (1,149); Huntington, WV |
| January 18, 2025; 1:00 pm, ESPN+ | | Appalachian State | L 64–68 | 5–13 (0–7) | 13 – Tied | 10 – Mays | 5 – Ai. Hayes | Cam Henderson Center (1,533); Huntington, WV |
| January 22, 2025; 6:00 pm, ESPN+ | | Georgia Southern | W 67–60 | 6–13 (1–7) | 25 – Ai. Hayes | 5 – Mays | 4 – Ilderton | Cam Henderson Center (1,117); Huntington, WV |
| January 26, 2025; 1:00 pm, ESPN+ | | Southern Miss | L 48–54 | 6–14 (1–8) | 26 – Ai. Hayes | 6 – Tied | 2 – 4 Tied | Cam Henderson Center (1,132); Huntington, WV |
| January 29, 2025; 6:00 pm, ESPN+ | | at Coastal Carolina | L 64–76 | 6–15 (1–9) | 20 – Maier | 8 – King | 3 – Tied | HTC Center (828); Conway, SC |
| February 1, 2025; 1:00 pm, ESPN+ | | at Georgia Southern | W 71–65 | 7–15 (2–9) | 25 – Mays | 6 – King | 3 – Ai. Hayes | Hill Convocation Center (621); Statesboro, GA |
| February 5, 2025; 7:00 pm, ESPN+ | | at Louisiana | L 88–92 ^{OT} | 7–16 (2–10) | 27 – Mays | 7 – King | 4 – Ai. Hayes | Cajundome (313); Lafayette, LA |
| February 8, 2025*; 1:00 pm, ESPN+ | | Central Michigan; MAC-SBC Challenge | L 68–73 | 7–17 | 20 – Ai. Hayes | 7 – Tied | 2 – 5 Tied | Cam Henderson Center (1,449); Huntington, WV |
| February 13, 2025; 6:00 pm, ESPN+ | | Old Dominion | W 73–70 ^{OT} | 8–17 (3–10) | 29 – Ai. Hayes | 6 – Yeast | 2 – Tied | Cam Henderson Center (1,036); Huntington, WV |
| February 15, 2025; 1:00 pm, ESPN+ | | Coastal Carolina | L 57–66 | 8–18 (3–11) | 20 – Mays | 8 – Mays | 3 – Tied | Cam Henderson Center (1,035); Huntington, WV |
| February 19, 2025; 6:30 pm, ESPN+ | | at Appalachian State | W 76–58 | 9–18 (4–11) | 29 – Ai. Hayes | 6 – Ai. Hayes | 3 – 3 Tied | Holmes Center (497); Boone, NC |
| February 22, 2025; 2:00 pm, ESPN+ | | at Georgia State | W 70–59 | 10–18 (5–11) | 26 – Ai. Hayes | 8 – Yeast | 4 – Mays | GSU Convocation Center (1,552); Atlanta, GA |
| February 26, 2025; 6:00 pm, ESPN+ | | Louisiana–Monroe | W 73–65 | 11–18 (6–11) | 16 – Kellione | 10 – Ai. Hayes | 6 – Ai. Hayes | Cam Henderson Center (1,006); Huntington, WV |
| February 28, 2025; 6:00 pm, ESPN+ | | Georgia State | L 68–70 | 11–19 (6–12) | 18 – Maier | 6 – 2 Tied | 5 – Kellione | Cam Henderson Center (1,576); Huntington, WV |
Sun Belt tournament
| March 4, 2025; 3:00 p.m., ESPN+ | (11) | vs. (14) South Alabama; First Round | W 73–59 | 12–19 | 22 – Ai. Hayes | 7 – Marigney | 4 – 2 Tied | Pensacola Bay Center (516); Pensacola, FL |
| March 5, 2025; 3:00 p.m., ESPN+ | (11) | vs. (10) Texas State; Second Round | W 68–62 | 13–19 | 17 – Ai. Hayes | 11 – Maier | 3 – Kellione | Pensacola Bay Center (1,112); Pensacola, FL |
| March 6, 2025; 3:00 p.m., ESPN+ | (11) | vs. (7) Louisiana; Third Round | W 48–46 | 14–19 | 21 – Hayes | 8 – Maier | 3 – Ilderton | Pensacola Bay Center (448); Pensacola, FL |
| March 7, 2025; 3:00 p.m., ESPN+ | (11) | vs. (6) Appalachian State; Fourth Round | W 75–66 | 15–19 | 21 – Ilderton | 9 – Mays | 4 – Ai. Hayes | Pensacola Bay Center (632); Pensacola, FL |
| March 8, 2025; 3:30 p.m., ESPN+ | (11) | vs. (3) Troy; Quarterfinals | L 54–85 | 15–20 | 23 – Ai. Hayes | 12 – Yeast | 2 – 3 Tied | Pensacola Bay Center (1,518); Pensacola, FL |
*Non-conference game. ^{#}Rankings from AP Poll. (#) Tournament seedings in parentheses. All times are in Eastern Time.

== See also ==
- 2024–25 Marshall Thundering Herd men's basketball team
