= October Mountain State Forest =

Protected area in Massachusetts, United States

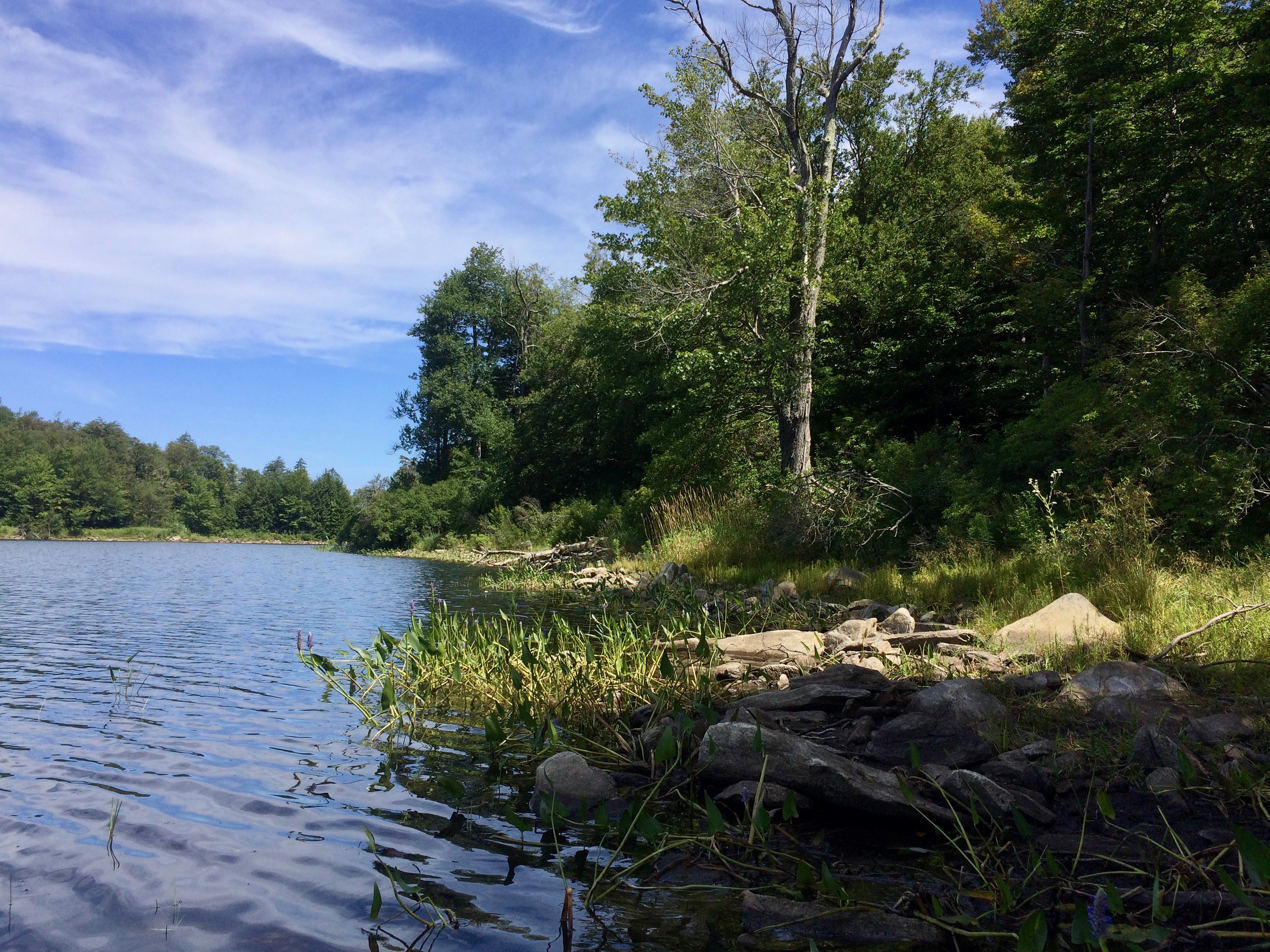
- Finerty Pond in October Mountain State Forest (Becket, Massachusetts).

- Location within Massachusetts Location within the United States
- Location: Becket, Lee, Lenox, and Washington, Massachusetts, United States
- Coordinates: 42°22′08″N 73°13′01″W
- Area: 16,460 acres (6,660 ha)
- Elevation: 1,972 ft (601 m)
- Established: 1915
- Administrator: Massachusetts Department of Conservation and Recreation
- Website: Official website

October Mountain State Forest is a 16,460-acre (6,660 ha) forest and recreational preserve located primarily in the town of Washington with adjoining parcels in Becket, Lee, and Lenox. It is the largest state forest in Massachusetts and is managed by the Massachusetts Department of Conservation and Recreation.

== History ==
The forest came into state ownership via the estate of William C. Whitney, President Grover Cleveland's Secretary of the Navy. The purchase of the initial 11,000 acres (4,500 ha) was made in 1915 for a total of $60,000, part of which came through the pledge of a group of Berkshire residents. The area was opened to the public that year. The name "October Mountain" is said to have been bestowed by author Herman Melville, whose home in Pittsfield overlooked the area.

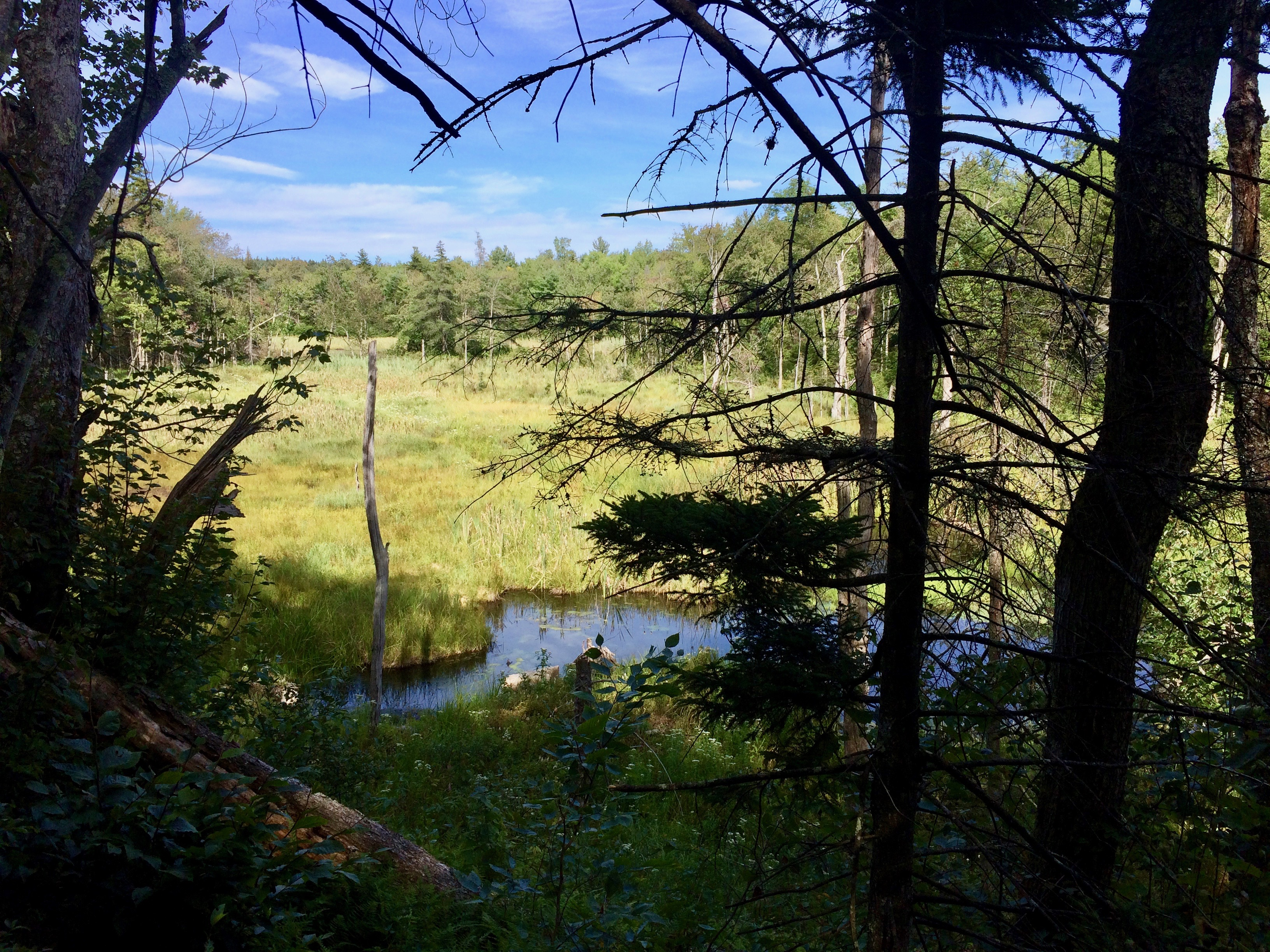
The view off of the Appalachian Trail in October Mountain State Forest of the Washington Mountain Marsh near West Branch Road. (Washington, Massachusetts)

== Activities and amenities ==
Forest trails are available for hiking, mountain biking, cross-country skiing, and off-road vehicle use. Trails include a 2.7-mile (4.3 km) interpretive trail around Washington Mountain Marsh, a portion of the Appalachian Trail, and a trail through scenic Schermerhorn Gorge. The forest has 47 campsites including wheelchair-accessible sites. Recreational opportunities include non-motorized boating, fishing, and restricted hunting.

== Geography ==
The forest encompasses a portion of the Hoosac Range on the western edge of the central Berkshires. The eponymous October Mountain is a ridge that rises steeply above the Housatonic River valley to the west and contains the forest's highest point. The central portion of the forest is an uplands area that includes several reservoirs, and the Washington Mountain Marsh. The eastern edge of the forest has a second, lower ridge, known as Washington Mountain.
