= Lee (CDP), Massachusetts =

Lee, Massachusetts
- Census-designated place
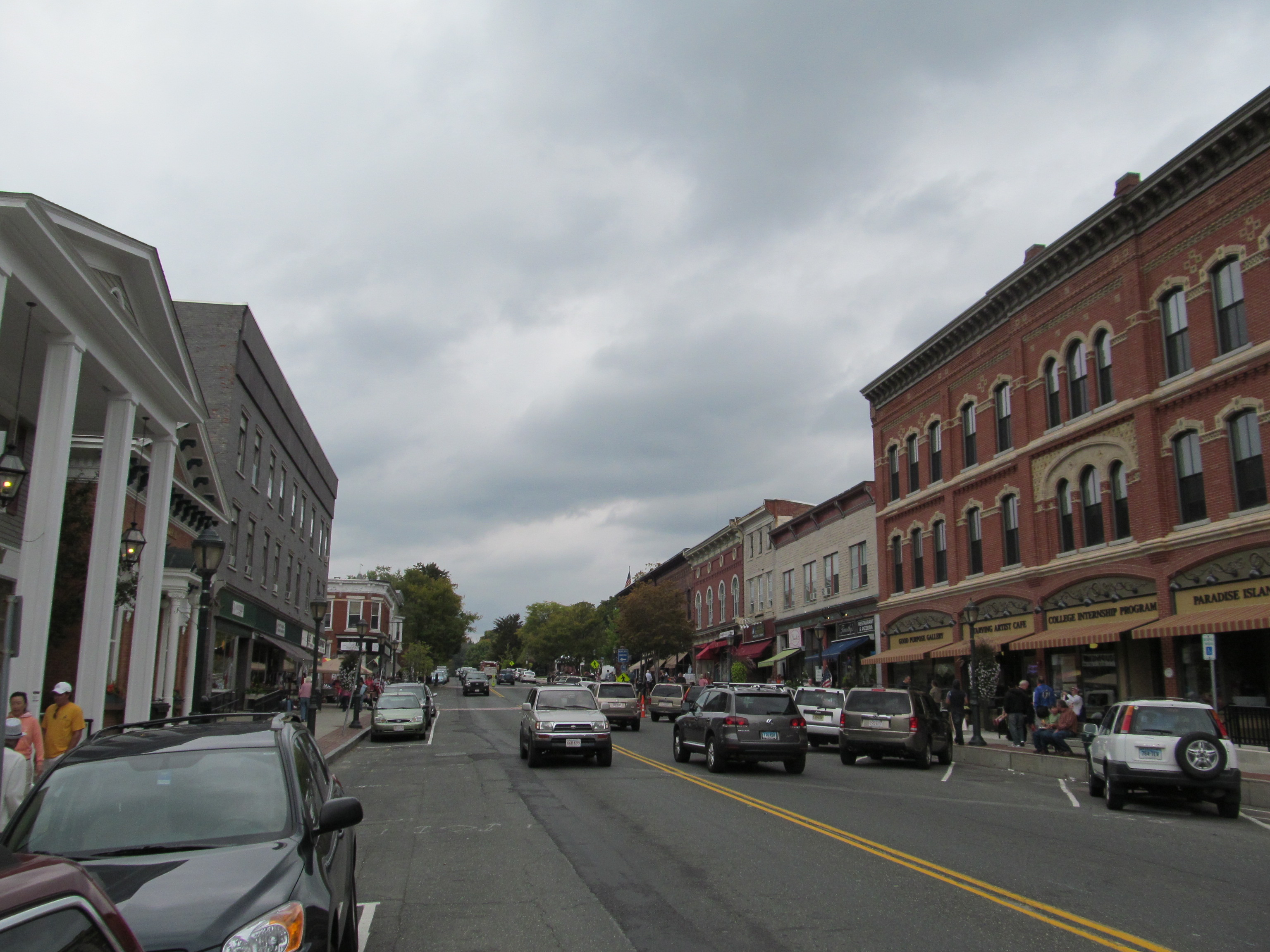
- Main Street

- Location in Berkshire County and the state of Massachusetts.
- Coordinates: 42°18′25″N 73°14′50″W
- Country: United States
- State: Massachusetts
- County: Berkshire
- Town: Lee

Area
  - Total: 1.36 sq mi (3.53 km^{2})
  - Land: 1.32 sq mi (3.43 km^{2})
  - Water: 0.035 sq mi (0.09 km^{2})
- Elevation: 883 ft (269 m)

Population (2020)
  - Total: 1,880
  - Density: 1,419.2/sq mi (547.95/km^{2})
- Time zone: UTC-5 (Eastern (EST))
  - Summer (DST): UTC-4 (EDT)
- ZIP Code: 01238
- Area code: 413
- FIPS code: 25-34620
- GNIS feature ID: 0607508

Lee is a census-designated place (CDP) located in the town of Lee in Berkshire County, Massachusetts, United States. The population was 2,051 at the 2010 census, out of 5,943 in the entire town of Lee.

== Geography ==
The Lee CDP is located in the center of the town of Lee at 42°18′24″N 73°14′50″W (42.306929, -73.247351). U.S. Route 20 passes through the CDP as Main Street and Housatonic Street, leading north to Lenox and Pittsfield and south to Interstate 90 (the Massachusetts Turnpike), which forms the southern edge of the CDP and accesses it via Turnpike Exit 2. The Housatonic River flows north to south through the center of the CDP.

According to the United States Census Bureau, the CDP has a total area of 1.4 square miles (3.5 km^{2}), of which 1.3 square miles (3.4 km^{2}) is land and 0.04 square miles (0.1 km^{2}), or 2.68%, is water.

== Demographics ==
Historical population
Census	Pop.	Note	%±
2020	1,880		—
U.S. Decennial Census

As of the census of 2000, there were 2,021 people, 901 households, and 500 families residing in the CDP. The population density was 573.8 people/km^{2} (1,486 people/mi^{2}). There were 953 housing units at an average density of 270.6 units/km^{2} (701 units/mi^{2}). The racial makeup of the CDP was 95.50% White, 1.39% Black or African American, 0.15% Native American, 0.89% Asian, 0.05% Pacific Islander, 1.24% from other races, and 0.79% from two or more races. Hispanic or Latino of any race were 4.50% of the population.

There were 901 households, out of which 27.0% had children under the age of 18 living with them, 41.4% were married couples living together, 10.4% had a female householder with no husband present, and 44.4% were non-families. 38.0% of all households were made up of individuals, and 16.8% had someone living alone who was 65 years of age or older. The average household size was 2.20 and the average family size was 2.88.

In the CDP, the population was spread out, with 21.8% under the age of 18, 9.0% from 18 to 24, 29.4% from 25 to 44, 22.9% from 45 to 64, and 17.0% who were 65 years of age or older. The median age was 39 years. For every 100 females, there were 89.4 males. For every 100 females age 18 and over, there were 89.8 males.

The median income for a household in the CDP was $32,183, and the median income for a family was $41,588. Males had a median income of $32,188 versus $25,741 for females. The per capita income for the CDP was $18,069. About 7.0% of families and 13.3% of the population were below the poverty line, including 9.7% of those under age 18 and 4.1% of those age 65 or over.
