= Michelle Cuevas =

American novelist

- Born: Lee, Massachusetts, U.S.
- Education: Williams College; University of Virginia (MFA)
- Occupation: Author
- Writing career
- Genre: Children's literature

Michelle Cuevas is an American children's book author. Her first novel, A Ugly Painting Elephant was published by Farrar Straus and Giroux in 2011. The book has been translated into German, Hebrew, Thai and Chinese. Her next two books, The Uncorker of Ocean Bottles and The Ornithologist's Dream will be released by Penguin Books in 2013. She would then write Confessions of an Imaginary Friend: A Memoir by Jacques Papier for Rocky Pond Books in 2017, which was going to be adapted by Steve Martino for Blue Sky Studios.

On November 22, 2021, it was announced that the adaptation of Confessions of an Imaginary Friend was revived at Disney Television Animation as part of the promotion of former Blue Sky Studios development CEO Lisa Fragner at DTVA, the film will release as a Disney+ original film.

Cuevas holds a degree in English from Williams College, and a MFA from University of Virginia. She was born in Lee, Massachusetts.
