= Hyde House (Lee, Massachusetts) =

Historic house in Massachusetts, United States

- U.S. National Register of Historic Places
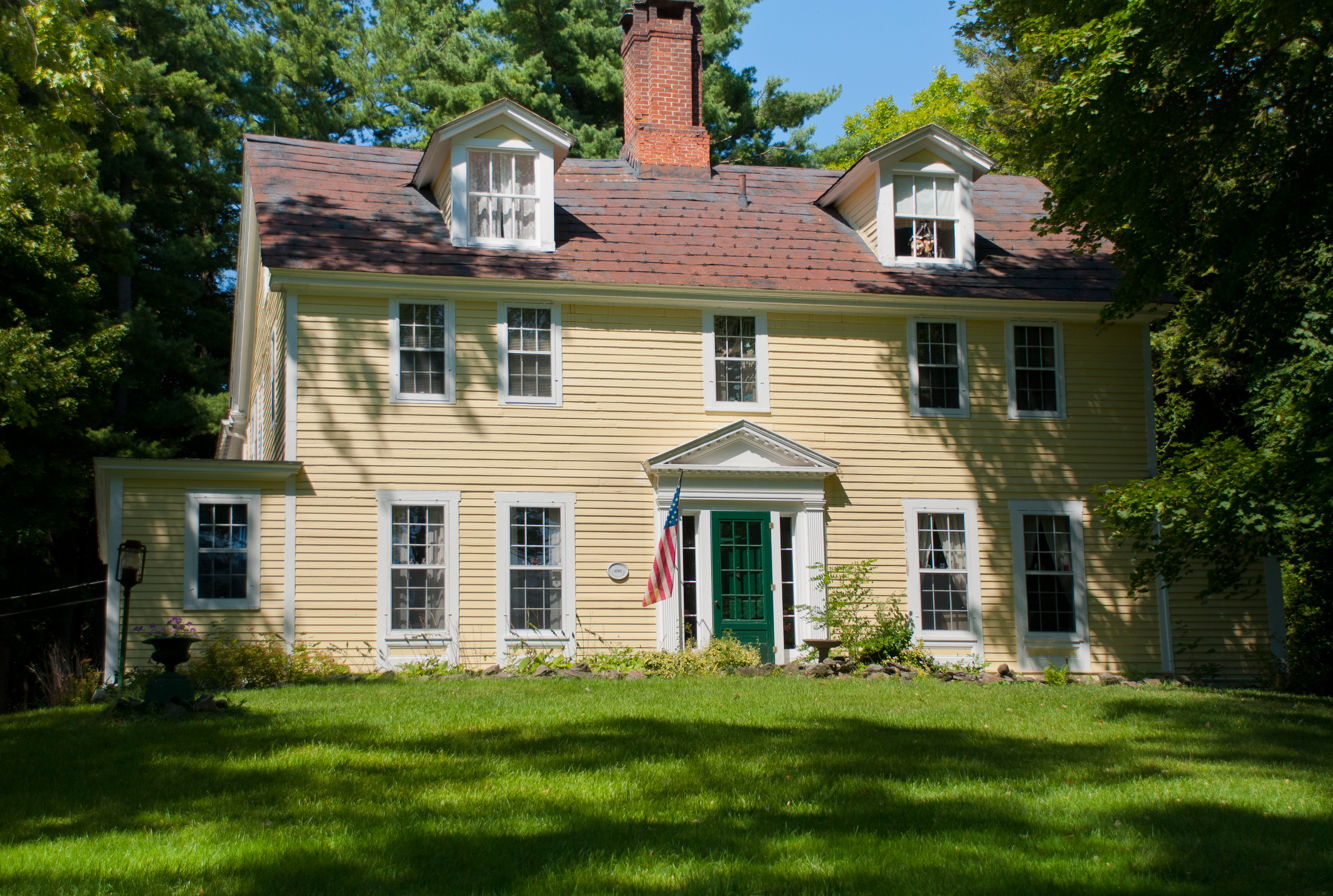

- Location within Massachusetts Location within the United States
- Location: 144 W. Park St., Lee, Massachusetts
- Coordinates: 42°18′13″N 73°15′12″W
- Area: 1.6 acres (0.65 ha)
- Built: 1792
- Architectural style: Georgian
- NRHP reference No.: 76000239
- Added to NRHP: November 21, 1976

The Hyde House is a historic house at 144 West Park Street in Lee, Massachusetts. built in 1792 for the town's first minister and subsequently altered significantly, it is important for its historical association with education in the town, hosting a boarding school in the 19th century. It was listed on the National Register of Historic Places in 1976.

== Description and history ==
The Hyde House is located west of Lee's main village, on the north side West Park Street, just east of its junction with St. James Avenue. It is set well back from the street, with a front yard of grass dotted with mature trees. It is a 2 1/2-story wood-frame structure, with a gabled roof, central chimney, and clapboarded exterior. The front roof face is pierced by two gabled dormers. The main facade is five bays wide, with a center entrance flanked by fluted pilasters and topped by a gabled pediment. The interior basically follows a center hall plan, but its original center staircase has been removed. Despite that and other alterations, the interior retains six working original fireplaces, and wide pine flooring.

The house was built in 1792 as the home of Lee's first minister, Alvan Hyde. Rev. Hyde served as minister to Lee's First Congregational Church for 41 years; the house eventually passed to his son, Alexander, who opened a school at the residence. The "Hyde House Boarding School for Boys" drew students from as far off as Boston, New York City, and Chicago; among its notable students was James Roosevelt, father of President Franklin Delano Roosevelt. At this time an academic wing was added to the back of the house, with a schoolroom on the lower floor and student bedrooms above.

== See also ==
- National Register of Historic Places listings in Berkshire County, Massachusetts
